= 1973–74 Buffalo Sabres season =

NHL hockey team season

1973–74 Buffalo Sabres
- Division: 5th East
- 1973–74 record: 32–34–12
- Home record: 23–10–6
- Road record: 9–24–6
- Goals for: 242
- Goals against: 250

Team information
- General manager: Punch Imlach
- Coach: Joe Crozier
- Captain: Gerry Meehan
- Alternate captains: Don Luce; Gilbert Perreault; Jim Schoenfeld
- Arena: Buffalo Memorial Auditorium
- Average attendance: 15,668

Team leaders
- Goals: Rick Martin (52)
- Assists: Rene Robert (44)
- Points: Rick Martin (86)
- Penalty minutes: Larry Carriere (103)
- Wins: Dave Dryden (23)
- Goals against average: Dave Dryden (2.97)

The 1973–74 Buffalo Sabres season was the Sabres' fourth season in the National Hockey League (NHL). The Sabres did not qualify for the 1974 Stanley Cup playoffs, despite qualifying the previous year.

== Offseason ==
=== NHL draft ===
Round	Pick	Player	Position	Nationality	College/Junior/Club team
1	12	Morris Titanic	Left wing	Canada	Sudbury Wolves (OHA)
2	28	Jean Landry	Defense	Canada	Quebec Remparts (QMJHL)
3	44	Andre Deschamps	Left wing	Canada	Quebec Remparts (QMJHL)
4	60	Yvon Dupuis	Right wing	Canada	Quebec Remparts (QMJHL)
5	76	Bob Smulders	Right wing	Canada	Peterborough Petes (OHA)
6	92	Neil Korzack	Left wing	Canada	Peterborough Petes (OHA)
7	108	Bob Young	Defense	United States	University of Denver (NCAA)
8	124	Tim O'Connell	Right wing	United States	University of Vermont (NCAA)

== Regular season ==
=== Death of Tim Horton ===
Early on the morning of February 21, 1974, while driving on the Queen Elizabeth Way from Toronto to Buffalo in his white De Tomaso Pantera sports car, (a gift from Sabres' GM George "Punch" Imlach), Horton was involved in what is now an infamous accident. He was negotiating a curve on the QEW where it crosses over Twelve Mile Creek in St. Catharines when he lost control and hit a cement culvert. The impact flipped the vehicle and Horton was thrown. He was not wearing a seat belt. Horton was reported dead on arrival at the local hospital, aged only 44. A police officer pursuing Horton's vehicle said that he had been travelling at over 160 km/h (100 mph).

There were reports Horton had consumed a considerable amount of vodka, and was rumoured to have been taking pain killers due to a jaw injury suffered in practice the day before. An autopsy report released in 2005 showed Horton had a blood alcohol level of twice the legal limit. The blood test also showed signs of amobarbital, which was possibly a residue from the Dexamyl pills that were found on Horton's body. The autopsy showed no indication Horton was taking painkillers as previously thought.

=== Season standings ===
East Division
		GP	W	L	T	GF	GA	DIFF	Pts
1	Boston Bruins	78	52	17	9	349	221	+128	113
2	Montreal Canadiens	78	45	24	9	293	240	+53	99
3	New York Rangers	78	40	24	14	300	251	+49	94
4	Toronto Maple Leafs	78	35	27	16	274	230	+44	86
5	Buffalo Sabres	78	32	34	12	242	250	−8	76
6	Detroit Red Wings	78	29	39	10	255	319	−64	68
7	Vancouver Canucks	78	24	43	11	224	296	−72	59
8	New York Islanders	78	19	41	18	182	247	−65	56

=== Record vs. opponents ===
==== Vs. East Division ====
1973–74 NHL records
Team	BOS	BUF	DET	MTL	NYI	NYR	TOR	VAN	Total
Boston	—	4–1	4–1–1	4–2	4–1	4–1	4–2	4–0–1	28–8–2
Buffalo	1–4	—	5–1	0–3–2	3–0–2	2–2–1	2–3–1	2–4	15–17–6
Detroit	1–4–1	1–5	—	2–3	4–1	2–3–1	2–2–1	2–3	14–21–3
Montreal	2–4	3–0–2	3–2	—	4–1–1	4–2	2–3	4–0–1	22–12–4
N.Y. Islanders	1–4	0–3–2	1–4	1–4–1	—	1–4	0–4–2	2–1–3	6–24–8
N.Y. Rangers	1–4	2–2–1	3–2–1	2–4	4–1	—	1–2–2	4–1–1	17–16–5
Toronto	2–4	3–2–1	2–2–1	3–2	4–0–2	2–1–2	—	0–4–1	16–15–7
Vancouver	0–4–1	4–2	3–2	0–4–1	1–2–3	1–4–1	4–0–1	—	13–18–7

==== Vs. West Division ====
1973–74 NHL records
Team	ATL	CAL	CHI	LAK	MIN	PHI	PIT	STL	Total
Boston	2–3	4–1	0–2–3	3–1–1	3–0–2	3–1–1	5–0	4–1	24–9–7
Buffalo	1–3–1	3–2	2–0–3	4–1	3–1–1	0–5	2–3	2–2–1	17–17–6
Detroit	1–3–1	4–1	0–4–1	3–1–1	2–1–2	0–5	2–2–1	3–1–1	15–18–7
Montreal	2–3	3–1–1	2–2–1	3–1–1	4–1	2–2–1	4–0–1	3–2	23–12–5
N.Y. Islanders	3–1–1	2–1–2	1–2–2	1–3–1	3–1–1	0–5	1–2–2	2–2–1	13–17–10
N.Y. Rangers	2–1–2	5–0	1–3–1	2–1–2	4–0–1	2–1–2	4–1	3–1–1	23–8–9
Toronto	4–0–1	4–0–1	1–3–1	2–1–2	3–1–1	0–4–1	3–1–1	2–2–1	19–12–9
Vancouver	2–3	4–1	0–4–1	2–3	0–4–1	1–3–1	1–4	1–3–1	11–25–4

== Schedule and results ==
1973–74 regular season
October

Game	Result	Date	Score	Opponent	Record
1	L	October 10, 1973	4–7	@ Toronto Maple Leafs (1973–74)	0–1–0
2	W	October 13, 1973	4–3	@ Minnesota North Stars (1973–74)	1–1–0
3	L	October 14, 1973	1–3	Vancouver Canucks (1973–74)	1–2–0
4	W	October 18, 1973	6–2	Los Angeles Kings (1973–74)	2–2–0
5	W	October 20, 1973	2–1	@ New York Islanders (1973–74)	3–2–0
6	W	October 21, 1973	4–3	Toronto Maple Leafs (1973–74)	4–2–0
7	W	October 24, 1973	3–1	Chicago Black Hawks (1973–74)	5–2–0
8	L	October 25, 1973	4–9	@ Boston Bruins (1973–74)	5–3–0
9	W	October 28, 1973	5–2	New York Islanders (1973–74)	6–3–0
10	W	October 31, 1973	3–2	California Golden Seals (1973–74)	7–3–0

November

Game	Result	Date	Score	Opponent	Record
11	T	November 4, 1973	1–1	Montreal Canadiens (1973–74)	7–3–1
12	L	November 6, 1973	2–3	@ Vancouver Canucks (1973–74)	7–4–1
13	L	November 9, 1973	3–6	@ California Golden Seals (1973–74)	7–5–1
14	W	November 10, 1973	5–3	@ Los Angeles Kings (1973–74)	8–5–1
15	W	November 14, 1973	3–1	@ Atlanta Flames (1973–74)	9–5–1
16	L	November 17, 1973	5–8	@ Montreal Canadiens (1973–74)	9–6–1
17	L	November 18, 1973	0–2	California Golden Seals (1973–74)	9–7–1
18	L	November 21, 1973	2–3	@ Atlanta Flames (1973–74)	9–8–1
19	L	November 22, 1973	6–7	New York Rangers (1973–74)	9–9–1
20	L	November 25, 1973	3–4	Atlanta Flames (1973–74)	9–10–1
21	W	November 29, 1973	2–1	Los Angeles Kings (1973–74)	10–10–1

December

Game	Result	Date	Score	Opponent	Record
22	W	December 1, 1973	4–1	@ Detroit Red Wings (1973–74)	11–10–1
23	W	December 2, 1973	6–1	Detroit Red Wings (1973–74)	12–10–1
24	W	December 6, 1973	8–4	New York Rangers (1973–74)	13–10–1
25	L	December 8, 1973	2–5	@ Boston Bruins (1973–74)	13–11–1
26	W	December 9, 1973	5–2	Toronto Maple Leafs (1973–74)	14–11–1
27	T	December 12, 1973	1–1	@ New York Rangers (1973–74)	14–11–2
28	L	December 15, 1973	3–4	@ Minnesota North Stars (1973–74)	14–12–2
29	L	December 16, 1973	2–5	St. Louis Blues (1973–74)	14–13–2
30	T	December 19, 1973	2–2	@ Chicago Black Hawks (1973–74)	14–13–3
31	T	December 20, 1973	2–2	Montreal Canadiens (1973–74)	14–13–4
32	L	December 22, 1973	1–7	@ Montreal Canadiens (1973–74)	14–14–4
33	W	December 23, 1973	3–2	Pittsburgh Penguins (1973–74)	15–14–4
34	W	December 27, 1973	3–1	Detroit Red Wings (1973–74)	16–14–4
35	L	December 30, 1973	4–5	Philadelphia Flyers (1973–74)	16–15–4
36	W	December 31, 1973	6–5	@ Detroit Red Wings (1973–74)	17–15–4

January

Game	Result	Date	Score	Opponent	Record
37	W	January 3, 1974	6–1	Pittsburgh Penguins (1973–74)	18–15–4
38	L	January 5, 1974	2–5	@ Pittsburgh Penguins (1973–74)	18–16–4
39	W	January 6, 1974	6–3	Vancouver Canucks (1973–74)	19–16–4
40	L	January 9, 1974	0–3	@ Atlanta Flames (1973–74)	19–17–4
41	W	January 10, 1974	7–2	New York Rangers (1973–74)	20–17–4
42	L	January 12, 1974	2–5	@ Pittsburgh Penguins (1973–74)	20–18–4
43	W	January 13, 1974	1–0	St. Louis Blues (1973–74)	21–18–4
44	L	January 17, 1974	2–7	@ Philadelphia Flyers (1973–74)	21–19–4
45	T	January 19, 1974	2–2	@ New York Islanders (1973–74)	21–19–5
46	W	January 20, 1974	6–4	California Golden Seals (1973–74)	22–19–5
47	L	January 24, 1974	1–4	Montreal Canadiens (1973–74)	22–20–5
48	L	January 27, 1974	2–3	Vancouver Canucks (1973–74)	22–21–5
49	L	January 31, 1974	3–4	@ Philadelphia Flyers (1973–74)	22–22–5

February

Game	Result	Date	Score	Opponent	Record
50	L	February 2, 1974	1–6	@ St. Louis Blues (1973–74)	22–23–5
51	T	February 3, 1974	3–3	Toronto Maple Leafs (1973–74)	22–23–6
52	L	February 6, 1974	1–5	@ Los Angeles Kings (1973–74)	22–24–6
53	W	February 8, 1974	7–2	@ California Golden Seals (1973–74)	23–24–6
54	L	February 10, 1974	2–5	@ Vancouver Canucks (1973–74)	23–25–6
55	W	February 14, 1974	4–2	Los Angeles Kings (1973–74)	24–25–6
56	W	February 17, 1974	2–1	Detroit Red Wings (1973–74)	25–25–6
57	L	February 20, 1974	2–4	@ Toronto Maple Leafs (1973–74)	25–26–6
58	T	February 21, 1974	4–4	Atlanta Flames (1973–74)	25–26–7
59	W	February 24, 1974	3–2	Boston Bruins (1973–74)	26–26–7
60	T	February 28, 1974	2–2	Chicago Black Hawks (1973–74)	26–26–8

March

Game	Result	Date	Score	Opponent	Record
61	L	March 2, 1974	2–4	@ Philadelphia Flyers (1973–74)	26–27–8
62	W	March 3, 1974	4–3	New York Islanders (1973–74)	27–27–8
63	T	March 6, 1974	4–4	@ Minnesota North Stars (1973–74)	27–27–9
64	W	March 8, 1974	4–2	@ Vancouver Canucks (1973–74)	28–27–9
65	L	March 10, 1974	3–4	Philadelphia Flyers (1973–74)	28–28–9
66	L	March 12, 1974	0–4	@ Boston Bruins (1973–74)	28–29–9
67	L	March 14, 1974	3–4	Boston Bruins (1973–74)	28–30–9
68	T	March 16, 1974	2–2	@ St. Louis Blues (1973–74)	28–30–10
69	W	March 17, 1974	5–2	Minnesota North Stars (1973–74)	29–30–10
70	W	March 20, 1974	3–2	@ Chicago Black Hawks (1973–74)	30–30–10
71	T	March 23, 1974	1–1	@ New York Islanders (1973–74)	30–30–11
72	L	March 24, 1974	3–5	@ New York Rangers (1973–74)	30–31–11
73	L	March 27, 1974	1–3	@ Detroit Red Wings (1973–74)	30–32–11
74	T	March 28, 1974	2–2	Chicago Black Hawks (1973–74)	30–32–12
75	W	March 31, 1974	6–1	Minnesota North Stars (1973–74)	31–32–12

April

Game	Result	Date	Score	Opponent	Record
76	L	April 4, 1974	2–4	@ Pittsburgh Penguins (1973–74)	31–33–12
77	L	April 6, 1974	1–3	@ Toronto Maple Leafs (1973–74)	31–34–12
78	W	April 7, 1974	5–2	St. Louis Blues (1973–74)	32–34–12

Legend: Win (2 points) Loss (0 points) Tie (1 point)

== Awards and records ==
- Rick Martin, Left Wing, NHL First Team All-Star
