= 1973–74 Vancouver Canucks season =

4th season in franchise history

1973–74 Vancouver Canucks
- Division: 7th East
- 1973–74 record: 24–43–11
- Home record: 14–18–7
- Road record: 10–25–4
- Goals for: 224
- Goals against: 296

Team information
- General manager: Hal Laycoe
- Coach: Bill McCreary Sr. (41 games); Phil Maloney (37 games)
- Captain: Orland Kurtenbach
- Alternate captains: Andre Boudrias; Barry Wilkins; Bobby Schmautz; Jocelyn Guevremont
- Arena: Pacific Coliseum
- Average attendance: 15,729

Team leaders
- Goals: Bobby Schmautz; Dennis Ververgaert (26)
- Assists: Andre Boudrias (59)
- Points: Andre Boudrias (75)
- Penalty minutes: Bob Dailey (137)
- Wins: Gary Smith (20)
- Goals against average: Gary Smith (3.44)

The 1973–74 Vancouver Canucks season was the team's 4th in the NHL. Vancouver finished 7th in the East Division for the third consecutive season, failing to reach the playoffs. Before the season started Bud Poile, the Canucks first general manager, left the team to become an executive with the World Hockey Association. Hal Laycoe, the first coach of the Canucks, was named Poile's replacement.

== Regular season ==
=== Final standings ===
East Division
| | | GP | W | L | T | GF | GA | DIFF | Pts |
|---|---|---|---|---|---|---|---|---|---|
| 1 | Boston Bruins | 78 | 52 | 17 | 9 | 349 | 221 | +128 | 113 |
| 2 | Montreal Canadiens | 78 | 45 | 24 | 9 | 293 | 240 | +53 | 99 |
| 3 | New York Rangers | 78 | 40 | 24 | 14 | 300 | 251 | +49 | 94 |
| 4 | Toronto Maple Leafs | 78 | 35 | 27 | 16 | 274 | 230 | +44 | 86 |
| 5 | Buffalo Sabres | 78 | 32 | 34 | 12 | 242 | 250 | −8 | 76 |
| 6 | Detroit Red Wings | 78 | 29 | 39 | 10 | 255 | 319 | −64 | 68 |
| 7 | Vancouver Canucks | 78 | 24 | 43 | 11 | 224 | 296 | −72 | 59 |
| 8 | New York Islanders | 78 | 19 | 41 | 18 | 182 | 247 | −65 | 56 |

=== Record vs. opponents ===
==== Vs. East Division ====
1973–74 NHL records
| Team | BOS | BUF | DET | MTL | NYI | NYR | TOR | VAN | Total |
|---|---|---|---|---|---|---|---|---|---|
| Boston | — | 4–1 | 4–1–1 | 4–2 | 4–1 | 4–1 | 4–2 | 4–0–1 | 28–8–2 |
| Buffalo | 1–4 | — | 5–1 | 0–3–2 | 3–0–2 | 2–2–1 | 2–3–1 | 2–4 | 15–17–6 |
| Detroit | 1–4–1 | 1–5 | — | 2–3 | 4–1 | 2–3–1 | 2–2–1 | 2–3 | 14–21–3 |
| Montreal | 2–4 | 3–0–2 | 3–2 | — | 4–1–1 | 4–2 | 2–3 | 4–0–1 | 22–12–4 |
| N.Y. Islanders | 1–4 | 0–3–2 | 1–4 | 1–4–1 | — | 1–4 | 0–4–2 | 2–1–3 | 6–24–8 |
| N.Y. Rangers | 1–4 | 2–2–1 | 3–2–1 | 2–4 | 4–1 | — | 1–2–2 | 4–1–1 | 17–16–5 |
| Toronto | 2–4 | 3–2–1 | 2–2–1 | 3–2 | 4–0–2 | 2–1–2 | — | 0–4–1 | 16–15–7 |
| Vancouver | 0–4–1 | 4–2 | 3–2 | 0–4–1 | 1–2–3 | 1–4–1 | 4–0–1 | — | 13–18–7 |

==== Vs. West Division ====
1973–74 NHL records
| Team | ATL | CAL | CHI | LAK | MIN | PHI | PIT | STL | Total |
|---|---|---|---|---|---|---|---|---|---|
| Boston | 2–3 | 4–1 | 0–2–3 | 3–1–1 | 3–0–2 | 3–1–1 | 5–0 | 4–1 | 24–9–7 |
| Buffalo | 1–3–1 | 3–2 | 2–0–3 | 4–1 | 3–1–1 | 0–5 | 2–3 | 2–2–1 | 17–17–6 |
| Detroit | 1–3–1 | 4–1 | 0–4–1 | 3–1–1 | 2–1–2 | 0–5 | 2–2–1 | 3–1–1 | 15–18–7 |
| Montreal | 2–3 | 3–1–1 | 2–2–1 | 3–1–1 | 4–1 | 2–2–1 | 4–0–1 | 3–2 | 23–12–5 |
| N.Y. Islanders | 3–1–1 | 2–1–2 | 1–2–2 | 1–3–1 | 3–1–1 | 0–5 | 1–2–2 | 2–2–1 | 13–17–10 |
| N.Y. Rangers | 2–1–2 | 5–0 | 1–3–1 | 2–1–2 | 4–0–1 | 2–1–2 | 4–1 | 3–1–1 | 23–8–9 |
| Toronto | 4–0–1 | 4–0–1 | 1–3–1 | 2–1–2 | 3–1–1 | 0–4–1 | 3–1–1 | 2–2–1 | 19–12–9 |
| Vancouver | 2–3 | 4–1 | 0–4–1 | 2–3 | 0–4–1 | 1–3–1 | 1–4 | 1–3–1 | 11–25–4 |

== Schedule and results ==
1973–74 regular season
October

| Game | Result | Date | Score | Opponent | Record |
|---|---|---|---|---|---|
| 1 | L | October 10, 1973 | 4–6 | @ Boston Bruins (1973–74) | 0–1–0 |
| 2 | L | October 13, 1973 | 3–4 | @ Montreal Canadiens (1973–74) | 0–2–0 |
| 3 | W | October 14, 1973 | 3–1 | @ Buffalo Sabres (1973–74) | 1–2–0 |
| 4 | L | October 17, 1973 | 0–5 | @ Chicago Black Hawks (1973–74) | 1–3–0 |
| 5 | W | October 19, 1973 | 2–1 | Philadelphia Flyers (1973–74) | 2–3–0 |
| 6 | W | October 23, 1973 | 3–0 | Atlanta Flames (1973–74) | 3–3–0 |
| 7 | W | October 26, 1973 | 8–3 | Detroit Red Wings (1973–74) | 4–3–0 |
| 8 | T | October 30, 1973 | 3–3 | New York Rangers (1973–74) | 4–3–1 |

November

| Game | Result | Date | Score | Opponent | Record |
|---|---|---|---|---|---|
| 9 | L | November 2, 1973 | 1–3 | St. Louis Blues (1973–74) | 4–4–1 |
| 10 | W | November 6, 1973 | 3–2 | Buffalo Sabres (1973–74) | 5–4–1 |
| 11 | L | November 9, 1973 | 0–4 | Chicago Black Hawks (1973–74) | 5–5–1 |
| 12 | L | November 11, 1973 | 2–4 | @ Boston Bruins (1973–74) | 5–6–1 |
| 13 | L | November 13, 1973 | 1–6 | @ St. Louis Blues (1973–74) | 5–7–1 |
| 14 | L | November 14, 1973 | 3–6 | @ Minnesota North Stars (1973–74) | 5–8–1 |
| 15 | T | November 16, 1973 | 3–3 | Toronto Maple Leafs (1973–74) | 5–8–2 |
| 16 | T | November 17, 1973 | 2–2 | Philadelphia Flyers (1973–74) | 5–8–3 |
| 17 | L | November 21, 1973 | 4–5 | @ Pittsburgh Penguins (1973–74) | 5–9–3 |
| 18 | L | November 23, 1973 | 1–4 | @ Atlanta Flames (1973–74) | 5–10–3 |
| 19 | L | November 25, 1973 | 0–5 | @ New York Rangers (1973–74) | 5–11–3 |
| 20 | T | November 27, 1973 | 2–2 | @ St. Louis Blues (1973–74) | 5–11–4 |
| 21 | L | November 30, 1973 | 4–5 | Minnesota North Stars (1973–74) | 5–12–4 |

December

| Game | Result | Date | Score | Opponent | Record |
|---|---|---|---|---|---|
| 22 | L | December 4, 1973 | 2–3 | Los Angeles Kings (1973–74) | 5–13–4 |
| 23 | L | December 7, 1973 | 0–2 | Atlanta Flames (1973–74) | 5–14–4 |
| 24 | W | December 8, 1973 | 3–2 | Pittsburgh Penguins (1973–74) | 6–14–4 |
| 25 | T | December 11, 1973 | 2–2 | Montreal Canadiens (1973–74) | 6–14–5 |
| 26 | L | December 15, 1973 | 2–7 | @ Boston Bruins (1973–74) | 6–15–5 |
| 27 | L | December 16, 1973 | 5–7 | @ Detroit Red Wings (1973–74) | 6–16–5 |
| 28 | T | December 18, 1973 | 2–2 | @ New York Islanders (1973–74) | 6–16–6 |
| 29 | L | December 20, 1973 | 3–9 | @ Philadelphia Flyers (1973–74) | 6–17–6 |
| 30 | W | December 22, 1973 | 6–4 | @ Toronto Maple Leafs (1973–74) | 7–17–6 |
| 31 | L | December 23, 1973 | 2–6 | @ Chicago Black Hawks (1973–74) | 7–18–6 |
| 32 | W | December 26, 1973 | 6–4 | California Golden Seals (1973–74) | 8–18–6 |
| 33 | L | December 28, 1973 | 3–5 | Minnesota North Stars (1973–74) | 8–19–6 |
| 34 | L | December 29, 1973 | 3–4 | New York Islanders (1973–74) | 8–20–6 |

January

| Game | Result | Date | Score | Opponent | Record |
|---|---|---|---|---|---|
| 35 | T | January 1, 1974 | 2–2 | Boston Bruins (1973–74) | 8–20–7 |
| 36 | L | January 3, 1974 | 2–3 | @ New York Islanders (1973–74) | 8–21–7 |
| 37 | L | January 5, 1974 | 3–5 | @ Montreal Canadiens (1973–74) | 8–22–7 |
| 38 | L | January 6, 1974 | 3–6 | @ Buffalo Sabres (1973–74) | 8–23–7 |
| 39 | L | January 8, 1974 | 1–3 | St. Louis Blues (1973–74) | 8–24–7 |
| 40 | W | January 11, 1974 | 3–2 | @ California Golden Seals (1973–74) | 9–24–7 |
| 41 | L | January 12, 1974 | 1–6 | New York Rangers (1973–74) | 9–25–7 |
| 42 | W | January 15, 1974 | 4–2 | Toronto Maple Leafs (1973–74) | 10–25–7 |
| 43 | L | January 18, 1974 | 2–6 | Pittsburgh Penguins (1973–74) | 10–26–7 |
| 44 | L | January 20, 1974 | 2–7 | @ Chicago Black Hawks (1973–74) | 10–27–7 |
| 45 | L | January 22, 1974 | 2–3 | Philadelphia Flyers (1973–74) | 10–28–7 |
| 46 | L | January 25, 1974 | 4–5 | Minnesota North Stars (1973–74) | 10–29–7 |
| 47 | W | January 27, 1974 | 3–2 | @ Buffalo Sabres (1973–74) | 11–29–7 |
| 48 | W | January 30, 1974 | 7–3 | @ Detroit Red Wings (1973–74) | 12–29–7 |

February

| Game | Result | Date | Score | Opponent | Record |
|---|---|---|---|---|---|
| 49 | T | February 2, 1974 | 2–2 | New York Islanders (1973–74) | 12–29–8 |
| 50 | L | February 6, 1974 | 2–4 | @ California Golden Seals (1973–74) | 12–30–8 |
| 51 | W | February 9, 1974 | 5–4 | Detroit Red Wings (1973–74) | 13–30–8 |
| 52 | W | February 10, 1974 | 5–2 | Buffalo Sabres (1973–74) | 14–30–8 |
| 53 | W | February 12, 1974 | 3–2 | @ St. Louis Blues (1973–74) | 15–30–8 |
| 54 | T | February 13, 1974 | 3–3 | @ Minnesota North Stars (1973–74) | 15–30–9 |
| 55 | L | February 15, 1974 | 2–4 | Boston Bruins (1973–74) | 15–31–9 |
| 56 | L | February 16, 1974 | 4–9 | New York Rangers (1973–74) | 15–32–9 |
| 57 | W | February 19, 1974 | 4–3 | @ Los Angeles Kings (1973–74) | 16–32–9 |
| 58 | L | February 21, 1974 | 2–5 | @ Montreal Canadiens (1973–74) | 16–33–9 |
| 59 | W | February 23, 1974 | 4–3 | @ Toronto Maple Leafs (1973–74) | 17–33–9 |
| 60 | T | February 26, 1974 | 1–1 | @ New York Islanders (1973–74) | 17–33–10 |
| 61 | L | February 27, 1974 | 2–4 | @ New York Rangers (1973–74) | 17–34–10 |

March

| Game | Result | Date | Score | Opponent | Record |
|---|---|---|---|---|---|
| 62 | L | March 2, 1974 | 1–6 | @ Pittsburgh Penguins (1973–74) | 17–35–10 |
| 63 | L | March 3, 1974 | 3–5 | @ Atlanta Flames (1973–74) | 17–36–10 |
| 64 | L | March 8, 1974 | 2–4 | Buffalo Sabres (1973–74) | 17–37–10 |
| 65 | T | March 9, 1974 | 4–4 | Chicago Black Hawks (1973–74) | 17–37–11 |
| 66 | L | March 12, 1974 | 1–2 | Detroit Red Wings (1973–74) | 17–38–11 |
| 67 | W | March 15, 1974 | 3–0 | Atlanta Flames (1973–74) | 18–38–11 |
| 68 | L | March 16, 1974 | 6–8 | Pittsburgh Penguins (1973–74) | 18–39–11 |
| 69 | W | March 20, 1974 | 7–5 | @ New York Rangers (1973–74) | 19–39–11 |
| 70 | L | March 21, 1974 | 1–3 | @ Philadelphia Flyers (1973–74) | 19–40–11 |
| 71 | L | March 23, 1974 | 0–5 | @ Los Angeles Kings (1973–74) | 19–41–11 |
| 72 | W | March 24, 1974 | 3–2 | Toronto Maple Leafs (1973–74) | 20–41–11 |
| 73 | L | March 26, 1974 | 3–4 | Montreal Canadiens (1973–74) | 20–42–11 |
| 74 | W | March 30, 1974 | 4–2 | New York Islanders (1973–74) | 21–42–11 |
| 75 | W | March 31, 1974 | 7–0 | California Golden Seals (1973–74) | 22–42–11 |

April

| Game | Result | Date | Score | Opponent | Record |
|---|---|---|---|---|---|
| 76 | W | April 3, 1974 | 4–1 | @ California Golden Seals (1973–74) | 23–42–11 |
| 77 | W | April 5, 1974 | 5–2 | Los Angeles Kings (1973–74) | 24–42–11 |
| 78 | L | April 6, 1974 | 1–11 | @ Los Angeles Kings (1973–74) | 24–43–11 |

Legend: Win (2 points) Loss (0 points) Tie (1 point)

== Awards and records ==
=== Trophies and awards ===
- Cyclone Taylor Award (Canucks MVP): Gary Smith
- Cyrus H. McLean Trophy (Canucks Leading Scorer): Andre Boudrias
- Babe Pratt Trophy (Canucks Outstanding Defenceman): Jocelyn Guevremont
- Fred J. Hume Award (Canucks Unsung Hero): Don Lever
- Most Exciting Player Award: Don Lever

== Draft picks ==
Vancouver's picks at the 1973 NHL amateur draft. The draft was held at the Mount Royal Hotel in Montreal.

| Round | # | Player | Nationality | College/junior/club team (league) |
|---|---|---|---|---|
| 1 | 3 | Dennis Ververgaert (RW) | Canada | London Knights (OHA) |
| 1 | 9 | Bob Dailey (D) | Canada | Toronto Marlboros (OHA) |
| 2 | 19 | Paulin Bordeleau (C) | Canada | Toronto Marlboros (OHA) |
| 3 | 35 | Paul Sheard (LW) | Canada | Ottawa 67's (OHA) |
| 4 | 51 | Keith Mackie | Canada | Edmonton Oil Kings (WCHL) |
| 5 | 67 | Paul O'Neil (C) | United States | Boston University (NCAA) |
| 6 | 83 | Jim Cowell (F) | Canada | Ottawa 67's (OHA) |
| 7 | 99 | Clay Hebenton (G) | Canada | Portland (WCHL) |
| 8 | 115 | John Senkpiel | Canada | Vancouver Nats (WCHL) |
| 9 | 131 | Peter Folco (D) | Canada | Quebec Remparts (QMJHL) |
| 10 | 146 | Terry McDougall | Canada | Swift Current Broncos (WCHL) |

== See also ==
- 1973–74 NHL season
