= 1973–74 New York Islanders season =

NHL hockey team season

1973–74 New York Islanders
- Division: 8th East
- 1973–74 record: 19–41–18
- Home record: 13–17–9
- Road record: 6–24–9
- Goals for: 182
- Goals against: 247

Team information
- General manager: Bill Torrey
- Coach: Al Arbour
- Captain: Ed Westfall
- Alternate captains: Billy Harris; Bert Marshall; Ralph Stewart
- Arena: Nassau Coliseum

Team leaders
- Goals: Ralph Stewart (23)
- Assists: Denis Potvin (37)
- Points: Denis Potvin (54)
- Penalty minutes: Garry Howatt (204)
- Wins: Billy Smith and Gerry Desjardins (9)
- Goals against average: Chico Resch (3.00)

The 1973–74 New York Islanders season was the second season for the New York Islanders franchise in the National Hockey League (NHL). During the regular season, the Islanders finished in eighth place in the East Division with a 19–41–18 record and did not qualify for the Stanley Cup playoffs for the second straight year.

== Regular season ==
=== Final standings ===
East Division
		GP	W	L	T	GF	GA	DIFF	Pts
1	Boston Bruins	78	52	17	9	349	221	+128	113
2	Montreal Canadiens	78	45	24	9	293	240	+53	99
3	New York Rangers	78	40	24	14	300	251	+49	94
4	Toronto Maple Leafs	78	35	27	16	274	230	+44	86
5	Buffalo Sabres	78	32	34	12	242	250	−8	76
6	Detroit Red Wings	78	29	39	10	255	319	−64	68
7	Vancouver Canucks	78	24	43	11	224	296	−72	59
8	New York Islanders	78	19	41	18	182	247	−65	56

=== Record vs. opponents ===
==== Vs. East Division ====
1973–74 NHL records
Team	BOS	BUF	DET	MTL	NYI	NYR	TOR	VAN	Total
Boston	—	4–1	4–1–1	4–2	4–1	4–1	4–2	4–0–1	28–8–2
Buffalo	1–4	—	5–1	0–3–2	3–0–2	2–2–1	2–3–1	2–4	15–17–6
Detroit	1–4–1	1–5	—	2–3	4–1	2–3–1	2–2–1	2–3	14–21–3
Montreal	2–4	3–0–2	3–2	—	4–1–1	4–2	2–3	4–0–1	22–12–4
N.Y. Islanders	1–4	0–3–2	1–4	1–4–1	—	1–4	0–4–2	2–1–3	6–24–8
N.Y. Rangers	1–4	2–2–1	3–2–1	2–4	4–1	—	1–2–2	4–1–1	17–16–5
Toronto	2–4	3–2–1	2–2–1	3–2	4–0–2	2–1–2	—	0–4–1	16–15–7
Vancouver	0–4–1	4–2	3–2	0–4–1	1–2–3	1–4–1	4–0–1	—	13–18–7

==== Vs. West Division ====
1973–74 NHL records
Team	ATL	CAL	CHI	LAK	MIN	PHI	PIT	STL	Total
Boston	2–3	4–1	0–2–3	3–1–1	3–0–2	3–1–1	5–0	4–1	24–9–7
Buffalo	1–3–1	3–2	2–0–3	4–1	3–1–1	0–5	2–3	2–2–1	17–17–6
Detroit	1–3–1	4–1	0–4–1	3–1–1	2–1–2	0–5	2–2–1	3–1–1	15–18–7
Montreal	2–3	3–1–1	2–2–1	3–1–1	4–1	2–2–1	4–0–1	3–2	23–12–5
N.Y. Islanders	3–1–1	2–1–2	1–2–2	1–3–1	3–1–1	0–5	1–2–2	2–2–1	13–17–10
N.Y. Rangers	2–1–2	5–0	1–3–1	2–1–2	4–0–1	2–1–2	4–1	3–1–1	23–8–9
Toronto	4–0–1	4–0–1	1–3–1	2–1–2	3–1–1	0–4–1	3–1–1	2–2–1	19–12–9
Vancouver	2–3	4–1	0–4–1	2–3	0–4–1	1–3–1	1–4	1–3–1	11–25–4

== Schedule and results ==
1973–74 regular season
October

Game	Result	Date	Score	Opponent	Record
1	T	October 10, 1973	1–1	@ Atlanta Flames (1973–74)	0–0–1
2	L	October 13, 1973	0–6	Philadelphia Flyers (1973–74)	0–1–1
3	L	October 14, 1973	2–3	@ Boston Bruins (1973–74)	0–2–1
4	T	October 16, 1973	4–4	Los Angeles Kings (1973–74)	0–2–2
5	L	October 20, 1973	1–2	Buffalo Sabres (1973–74)	0–3–2
6	T	October 21, 1973	3–3	@ Chicago Black Hawks (1973–74)	0–3–3
7	T	October 25, 1973	1–1	Minnesota North Stars (1973–74)	0–3–4
8	W	October 27, 1973	3–2	New York Rangers (1973–74)	1–3–4
9	L	October 28, 1973	2–5	@ Buffalo Sabres (1973–74)	1–4–4

November

Game	Result	Date	Score	Opponent	Record
10	T	November 1, 1973	2–2	Toronto Maple Leafs (1973–74)	1–4–5
11	W	November 3, 1973	6–4	Boston Bruins (1973–74)	2–4–5
12	T	November 7, 1973	1–1	@ Pittsburgh Penguins (1973–74)	2–4–6
13	T	November 10, 1973	3–3	@ Toronto Maple Leafs (1973–74)	2–4–7
14	L	November 11, 1973	2–5	@ New York Rangers (1973–74)	2–5–7
15	L	November 14, 1973	3–4	@ Detroit Red Wings (1973–74)	2–6–7
16	L	November 17, 1973	0–4	@ St. Louis Blues (1973–74)	2–7–7
17	L	November 20, 1973	2–4	Toronto Maple Leafs (1973–74)	2–8–7
18	W	November 22, 1973	5–3	Detroit Red Wings (1973–74)	3–8–7
19	L	November 24, 1973	4–6	@ Detroit Red Wings (1973–74)	3–9–7
20	W	November 27, 1973	4–2	Atlanta Flames (1973–74)	4–9–7

December

Game	Result	Date	Score	Opponent	Record
21	L	December 1, 1973	1–2	Philadelphia Flyers (1973–74)	4–10–7
22	L	December 2, 1973	3–5	@ Boston Bruins (1973–74)	4–11–7
23	L	December 4, 1973	1–3	St. Louis Blues (1973–74)	4–12–7
24	L	December 6, 1973	2–4	Montreal Canadiens (1973–74)	4–13–7
25	L	December 8, 1973	1–3	@ Montreal Canadiens (1973–74)	4–14–7
26	W	December 11, 1973	6–3	California Golden Seals (1973–74)	5–14–7
27	L	December 13, 1973	2–3	@ Los Angeles Kings (1973–74)	5–15–7
28	T	December 15, 1973	3–3	Chicago Black Hawks (1973–74)	5–15–8
29	L	December 16, 1973	0–4	@ Philadelphia Flyers (1973–74)	5–16–8
30	T	December 18, 1973	2–2	Vancouver Canucks (1973–74)	5–16–9
31	W	December 22, 1973	4–2	@ St. Louis Blues (1973–74)	6–16–9
32	T	December 23, 1973	1–1	Montreal Canadiens (1973–74)	6–16–10
33	L	December 26, 1973	0–1	@ Minnesota North Stars (1973–74)	6–17–10
34	T	December 28, 1973	4–4	@ California Golden Seals (1973–74)	6–17–11
35	W	December 29, 1973	4–3	@ Vancouver Canucks (1973–74)	7–17–11

January

Game	Result	Date	Score	Opponent	Record
36	L	January 2, 1974	1–5	@ Chicago Black Hawks (1973–74)	7–18–11
37	W	January 3, 1974	3–2	Vancouver Canucks (1973–74)	8–18–11
38	L	January 5, 1974	2–6	Boston Bruins (1973–74)	8–19–11
39	L	January 8, 1974	1–3	Los Angeles Kings (1973–74)	8–20–11
40	L	January 10, 1974	3–8	@ Montreal Canadiens (1973–74)	8–21–11
41	W	January 12, 1974	4–3	@ Minnesota North Stars (1973–74)	9–21–11
42	W	January 15, 1974	4–3	Atlanta Flames (1973–74)	10–21–11
43	T	January 19, 1974	2–2	Buffalo Sabres (1973–74)	10–21–12
44	W	January 22, 1974	4–3	California Golden Seals (1973–74)	11–21–12
45	L	January 26, 1974	0–4	Boston Bruins (1973–74)	11–22–12
46	W	January 27, 1974	4–2	@ Chicago Black Hawks (1973–74)	12–22–12
47	W	January 31, 1974	4–2	@ Los Angeles Kings (1973–74)	13–22–12

February

Game	Result	Date	Score	Opponent	Record
48	T	February 2, 1974	2–2	@ Vancouver Canucks (1973–74)	13–22–13
49	L	February 3, 1974	2–4	@ California Golden Seals (1973–74)	13–23–13
50	W	February 5, 1974	6–2	Minnesota North Stars (1973–74)	14–23–13
51	L	February 6, 1974	0–6	@ New York Rangers (1973–74)	14–24–13
52	L	February 9, 1974	2–3	Pittsburgh Penguins (1973–74)	14–25–13
53	L	February 12, 1974	1–4	Atlanta Flames (1973–74)	14–26–13
54	T	February 14, 1974	2–2	@ St. Louis Blues (1973–74)	14–26–14
55	L	February 16, 1974	0–4	Chicago Black Hawks (1973–74)	14–27–14
56	W	February 19, 1974	5–3	Montreal Canadiens (1973–74)	15–27–14
57	L	February 24, 1974	3–5	@ Detroit Red Wings (1973–74)	15–28–14
58	T	February 26, 1974	1–1	Vancouver Canucks (1973–74)	15–28–15
59	L	February 28, 1974	4–6	Toronto Maple Leafs (1973–74)	15–29–15

March

Game	Result	Date	Score	Opponent	Record
60	L	March 2, 1974	2–5	@ Toronto Maple Leafs (1973–74)	15–30–15
61	L	March 3, 1974	3–4	@ Buffalo Sabres (1973–74)	15–31–15
62	L	March 5, 1974	1–2	Pittsburgh Penguins (1973–74)	15–32–15
63	L	March 9, 1974	1–3	Detroit Red Wings (1973–74)	15–33–15
64	L	March 10, 1974	2–4	@ New York Rangers (1973–74)	15–34–15
65	L	March 12, 1974	1–2	Philadelphia Flyers (1973–74)	15–35–15
66	L	March 14, 1974	1–2	@ Toronto Maple Leafs (1973–74)	15–36–15
67	L	March 16, 1974	1–3	New York Rangers (1973–74)	15–37–15
68	L	March 17, 1974	2–4	@ Montreal Canadiens (1973–74)	15–38–15
69	W	March 19, 1974	5–1	St. Louis Blues (1973–74)	16–38–15
70	T	March 20, 1974	1–1	@ Pittsburgh Penguins (1973–74)	16–38–16
71	T	March 23, 1974	1–1	Buffalo Sabres (1973–74)	16–38–17
72	W	March 24, 1974	6–4	@ Atlanta Flames (1973–74)	17–38–17
73	T	March 27, 1974	2–2	@ California Golden Seals (1973–74)	17–38–18
74	L	March 28, 1974	1–4	@ Los Angeles Kings (1973–74)	17–39–18
75	L	March 30, 1974	2–4	@ Vancouver Canucks (1973–74)	17–40–18

April

Game	Result	Date	Score	Opponent	Record
76	W	April 2, 1974	3–2	Pittsburgh Penguins (1973–74)	18–40–18
77	L	April 4, 1974	0–4	@ Philadelphia Flyers (1973–74)	18–41–18
78	W	April 6, 1974	4–2	Minnesota North Stars (1973–74)	19–41–18

Legend: Win (2 points) Loss (0 points) Tie (1 point)

== Player statistics ==
Regular season
Scoring

Player	Pos	GP	G	A	Pts	PIM	+/-	PPG	SHG	GWG
Denis Potvin	D	77	17	37	54	175	−16	6	0	3
Billy Harris	RW	78	23	27	50	34	−11	4	0	3
Ralph Stewart	C	67	23	20	43	6	−7	2	5	2
Ed Westfall	D/RW	68	19	23	42	28	−5	6	0	0
Bob Nystrom	RW	77	21	20	41	118	−17	3	0	5
Craig Cameron	RW	78	15	14	29	28	−15	2	0	2
Jean Potvin	D	78	5	23	28	100	−26	2	0	0
Lorne Henning	C	60	12	15	27	6	−7	2	0	1
Germain Gagnon	LW	62	8	14	22	8	6	0	0	0
Brian Spencer	LW	54	5	16	21	65	−16	0	0	0
Garry Howatt	LW	78	6	11	17	204	−13	0	0	0
Dave Lewis	D	66	2	15	17	58	−7	1	1	1
Andre St. Laurent	C	42	5	9	14	18	1	0	0	0
Ernie Hicke	LW	55	6	7	13	26	−19	2	0	1
Billy MacMillan	RW	55	4	9	13	16	−6	0	0	0
Dave Hudson	C	63	2	10	12	7	−6	0	0	0
Gerry Hart	D	70	1	10	11	61	−17	0	0	1
Bert Marshall	D	69	1	7	8	84	5	0	0	0
Doug Rombough	C	12	3	1	4	8	1	2	0	0
Bob Cook	RW	22	2	1	3	4	3	0	0	0
Tom Miller	C	19	2	1	3	4	−3	0	1	0
Gerry Desjardins	G	36	0	0	0	0	0	0	0	0
Bryan Lefley	D/LW	7	0	0	0	0	0	0	0	0
Brian Marchinko	C	6	0	0	0	0	0	0	0	0
Neil Nicholson	D	8	0	0	0	0	2	0	0	0
Glenn Resch	G	2	0	0	0	0	0	0	0	0
Billy Smith	G	46	0	0	0	11	0	0	0	0
Vic Teal	RW	1	0	0	0	0	1	0	0	0

Goaltending

Player	MIN	GP	W	L	T	GA	GAA	SO
Gerry Desjardins	1945	36	9	17	6	101	3.12	0
Billy Smith	2615	46	9	23	12	134	3.07	0
Glenn Resch	120	2	1	1	0	6	3.00	0
Team:	4680	78	19	41	18	241	3.09	0

Note: Pos = Position; GP = Games played; G = Goals; A = Assists; Pts = Points; +/- = plus/minus; PIM = Penalty minutes; PPG = Power-play goals; SHG = Short-handed goals; GWG = Game-winning goals
MIN = Minutes played; W = Wins; L = Losses; T = Ties; GA = Goals-against; GAA = Goals-against average; SO = Shutouts;

== Draft picks ==
The 1973 NHL amateur draft was held on May 15, 1973, at the Mount Royal Hotel in Montreal.

Pick #	Player	Position	Nationality	College/junior/club team
1	Denis Potvin	Defence	Canada	Ottawa 67's (OHA)
33	Dave Lewis	Defence	Canada	Saskatoon Blades (WCHL)
49	Andre St. Laurent	Centre	Canada	Montreal Junior Canadiens (QMJHL)
65	Ron Kennedy	Right wing	Canada	New Westminster Bruins (WCHL)
81	Keith Smith	Defence	Canada	Brown University (ECAC)
97	Don Cutts	Goaltender	Canada	Rensselaer Polytechnic Institute (NCAA)
110	Denis Andersen	Defence	Canada	New Westminster Bruins (WCHL)
113	Mike Kennedy	Right wing	Canada	Kitchener Rangers (OHA)
126	Denis Desgagnes	Centre	Canada	Sorel Eperviers (QMJHL)
129	Bob Lorimer	Defence	Canada	Michigan Technological University (NCAA)
^{Reference: "1973 NHL Amateur Draft hockeydraftcentral.com".}

== See also ==
- 1973–74 NHL season
