= 1973–74 Montreal Canadiens season =

NHL hockey team season

1973–74 Montreal Canadiens
- Division: 2nd East
- 1973–74 record: 45–24–9
- Home record: 24–12–3
- Road record: 21–12–6
- Goals for: 293
- Goals against: 240

Team information
- General manager: Sam Pollock
- Coach: Scotty Bowman
- Captain: Henri Richard
- Alternate captains: Yvan Cournoyer; Frank Mahovlich
- Arena: Montreal Forum

Team leaders
- Goals: Yvan Cournoyer (40)
- Assists: Frank Mahovlich (49)
- Points: Frank Mahovlich (80)
- Penalty minutes: Pete Mahovlich (122)
- Wins: Wayne Thomas (23)
- Goals against average: Wayne Thomas (2.76)

The 1973–74 Montreal Canadiens season was the 65th season in team history. The Canadiens qualified for the playoffs, losing in the first round to the New York Rangers.

== Off-season ==
Ken Dryden shocked the hockey world as he sat out the entire 1973–74 season. He had won a Vezina Trophy and helped lead Canada past Russia in the dramatic Hockey Summit of 1972. Despite his bargaining power, most players in Dryden's position would have simply accepted what the Canadiens were giving him. Dryden bolted training camp, while general manager Sam Pollock fumed.

== Regular season ==
Wayne Thomas replaced Dryden as the starting goaltender and appeared in 42 games. Frank Mahovlich led the team in scoring with 80 points, while Yvan Cournoyer led the team in goals with 40.

=== Final standings ===
East Division
		GP	W	L	T	GF	GA	DIFF	Pts
1	Boston Bruins	78	52	17	9	349	221	+128	113
2	Montreal Canadiens	78	45	24	9	293	240	+53	99
3	New York Rangers	78	40	24	14	300	251	+49	94
4	Toronto Maple Leafs	78	35	27	16	274	230	+44	86
5	Buffalo Sabres	78	32	34	12	242	250	−8	76
6	Detroit Red Wings	78	29	39	10	255	319	−64	68
7	Vancouver Canucks	78	24	43	11	224	296	−72	59
8	New York Islanders	78	19	41	18	182	247	−65	56

=== Record vs. opponents ===
==== Vs. East Division ====
1973–74 NHL records
Team	BOS	BUF	DET	MTL	NYI	NYR	TOR	VAN	Total
Boston	—	4–1	4–1–1	4–2	4–1	4–1	4–2	4–0–1	28–8–2
Buffalo	1–4	—	5–1	0–3–2	3–0–2	2–2–1	2–3–1	2–4	15–17–6
Detroit	1–4–1	1–5	—	2–3	4–1	2–3–1	2–2–1	2–3	14–21–3
Montreal	2–4	3–0–2	3–2	—	4–1–1	4–2	2–3	4–0–1	22–12–4
N.Y. Islanders	1–4	0–3–2	1–4	1–4–1	—	1–4	0–4–2	2–1–3	6–24–8
N.Y. Rangers	1–4	2–2–1	3–2–1	2–4	4–1	—	1–2–2	4–1–1	17–16–5
Toronto	2–4	3–2–1	2–2–1	3–2	4–0–2	2–1–2	—	0–4–1	16–15–7
Vancouver	0–4–1	4–2	3–2	0–4–1	1–2–3	1–4–1	4–0–1	—	13–18–7

==== Vs. West Division ====
1973–74 NHL records
Team	ATL	CAL	CHI	LAK	MIN	PHI	PIT	STL	Total
Boston	2–3	4–1	0–2–3	3–1–1	3–0–2	3–1–1	5–0	4–1	24–9–7
Buffalo	1–3–1	3–2	2–0–3	4–1	3–1–1	0–5	2–3	2–2–1	17–17–6
Detroit	1–3–1	4–1	0–4–1	3–1–1	2–1–2	0–5	2–2–1	3–1–1	15–18–7
Montreal	2–3	3–1–1	2–2–1	3–1–1	4–1	2–2–1	4–0–1	3–2	23–12–5
N.Y. Islanders	3–1–1	2–1–2	1–2–2	1–3–1	3–1–1	0–5	1–2–2	2–2–1	13–17–10
N.Y. Rangers	2–1–2	5–0	1–3–1	2–1–2	4–0–1	2–1–2	4–1	3–1–1	23–8–9
Toronto	4–0–1	4–0–1	1–3–1	2–1–2	3–1–1	0–4–1	3–1–1	2–2–1	19–12–9
Vancouver	2–3	4–1	0–4–1	2–3	0–4–1	1–3–1	1–4	1–3–1	11–25–4

== Playoffs ==
The Canadiens qualified for the playoffs in second place, setting up a match-up with the third-place New York Rangers. The Rangers defeated the Canadiens twice at the Forum to win the series four games to two. Rookie goaltender Michel Larocque played all six games for the Canadiens.

== Schedule and results ==
1973–74 regular season
October

Game	Result	Date	Score	Opponent	Record
1	W	October 10, 1973	5–2	@ Minnesota North Stars (1973–74)	1–0–0
2	W	October 13, 1973	4–3	Vancouver Canucks (1973–74)	2–0–0
3	L	October 17, 1973	3–5	Toronto Maple Leafs (1973–74)	2–1–0
4	L	October 20, 1973	2–4	Atlanta Flames (1973–74)	2–2–0
5	W	October 21, 1973	3–2	@ New York Rangers (1973–74)	3–2–0
6	W	October 24, 1973	3–2	@ Pittsburgh Penguins (1973–74)	4–2–0
7	W	October 25, 1973	4–0	@ Philadelphia Flyers (1973–74)	5–2–0
8	W	October 27, 1973	4–2	Minnesota North Stars (1973–74)	6–2–0
9	T	October 31, 1973	1–1	Pittsburgh Penguins (1973–74)	6–2–1

November

Game	Result	Date	Score	Opponent	Record
10	W	November 3, 1973	6–2	California Golden Seals (1973–74)	7–2–1
11	T	November 4, 1973	1–1	@ Buffalo Sabres (1973–74)	7–2–2
12	W	November 7, 1973	4–1	@ Toronto Maple Leafs (1973–74)	8–2–2
13	L	November 8, 1973	1–2	@ Boston Bruins (1973–74)	8–3–2
14	L	November 10, 1973	0–5	St. Louis Blues (1973–74)	8–4–2
15	L	November 14, 1973	3–4	Boston Bruins (1973–74)	8–5–2
16	W	November 17, 1973	8–5	Buffalo Sabres (1973–74)	9–5–2
17	L	November 18, 1973	4–6	@ Detroit Red Wings (1973–74)	9–6–2
18	W	November 21, 1973	4–3	@ Minnesota North Stars (1973–74)	10–6–2
19	W	November 24, 1973	5–2	@ Pittsburgh Penguins (1973–74)	11–6–2
20	W	November 25, 1973	6–4	@ Chicago Black Hawks (1973–74)	12–6–2
21	W	November 28, 1973	5–3	Los Angeles Kings (1973–74)	13–6–2

December

Game	Result	Date	Score	Opponent	Record
22	L	December 1, 1973	0–5	Chicago Black Hawks (1973–74)	13–7–2
23	W	December 2, 1973	3–1	@ Atlanta Flames (1973–74)	14–7–2
24	W	December 6, 1973	4–2	@ New York Islanders (1973–74)	15–7–2
25	W	December 8, 1973	3–1	New York Islanders (1973–74)	16–7–2
26	T	December 11, 1973	2–2	@ Vancouver Canucks (1973–74)	16–7–3
27	T	December 14, 1973	2–2	@ California Golden Seals (1973–74)	16–7–4
28	W	December 15, 1973	6–2	@ Los Angeles Kings (1973–74)	17–7–4
29	W	December 18, 1973	4–1	California Golden Seals (1973–74)	18–7–4
30	T	December 20, 1973	2–2	@ Buffalo Sabres (1973–74)	18–7–5
31	W	December 22, 1973	7–1	Buffalo Sabres (1973–74)	19–7–5
32	T	December 23, 1973	1–1	@ New York Islanders (1973–74)	19–7–6
33	L	December 26, 1973	2–9	@ Toronto Maple Leafs (1973–74)	19–8–6
34	W	December 29, 1973	7–1	New York Rangers (1973–74)	20–8–6

January

Game	Result	Date	Score	Opponent	Record
35	L	January 2, 1974	4–8	@ St. Louis Blues (1973–74)	20–9–6
36	W	January 5, 1974	5–3	Vancouver Canucks (1973–74)	21–9–6
37	W	January 7, 1974	2–1	Philadelphia Flyers (1973–74)	22–9–6
38	W	January 10, 1974	8–3	New York Islanders (1973–74)	23–9–6
39	W	January 12, 1974	7–3	@ Boston Bruins (1973–74)	24–9–6
40	L	January 15, 1974	1–2	Los Angeles Kings (1973–74)	24–10–6
41	W	January 17, 1974	6–1	Minnesota North Stars (1973–74)	25–10–6
42	L	January 19, 1974	0–8	Boston Bruins (1973–74)	25–11–6
43	W	January 20, 1974	3–2	@ Detroit Red Wings (1973–74)	26–11–6
44	W	January 23, 1974	4–3	Toronto Maple Leafs (1973–74)	27–11–6
45	W	January 24, 1974	4–1	@ Buffalo Sabres (1973–74)	28–11–6
46	W	January 26, 1974	4–1	Chicago Black Hawks (1973–74)	29–11–6

February

Game	Result	Date	Score	Opponent	Record
47	L	February 1, 1974	3–5	@ Atlanta Flames (1973–74)	29–12–6
48	W	February 3, 1974	4–1	@ Detroit Red Wings (1973–74)	30–12–6
49	W	February 5, 1974	3–2	@ St. Louis Blues (1973–74)	31–12–6
50	L	February 6, 1974	3–4	@ Minnesota North Stars (1973–74)	31–13–6
51	W	February 9, 1974	7–2	New York Rangers (1973–74)	32–13–6
52	L	February 10, 1974	1–3	@ Philadelphia Flyers (1973–74)	32–14–6
53	L	February 13, 1974	2–3	Atlanta Flames (1973–74)	32–15–6
54	W	February 15, 1974	9–4	Detroit Red Wings (1973–74)	33–15–6
55	T	February 17, 1974	2–2	Philadelphia Flyers (1973–74)	33–15–7
56	L	February 19, 1974	3–5	@ New York Islanders (1973–74)	33–16–7
57	W	February 21, 1974	5–2	Vancouver Canucks (1973–74)	34–16–7
58	T	February 23, 1974	4–4	Los Angeles Kings (1973–74)	34–16–8
59	W	February 24, 1974	3–2	St. Louis Blues (1973–74)	35–16–8
60	W	February 26, 1974	6–5	@ Atlanta Flames (1973–74)	36–16–8
61	W	February 28, 1974	7–1	Pittsburgh Penguins (1973–74)	37–16–8

March

Game	Result	Date	Score	Opponent	Record
62	L	March 2, 1974	3–4	California Golden Seals (1973–74)	37–17–8
63	L	March 3, 1974	0–6	@ Philadelphia Flyers (1973–74)	37–18–8
64	L	March 6, 1974	2–9	@ New York Rangers (1973–74)	37–19–8
65	W	March 9, 1974	4–2	New York Rangers (1973–74)	38–19–8
66	W	March 10, 1974	5–4	@ Pittsburgh Penguins (1973–74)	39–19–8
67	T	March 13, 1974	3–3	@ Chicago Black Hawks (1973–74)	39–19–9
68	L	March 16, 1974	1–3	Chicago Black Hawks (1973–74)	39–20–9
69	W	March 17, 1974	4–2	New York Islanders (1973–74)	40–20–9
70	L	March 20, 1974	6–7	Detroit Red Wings (1973–74)	40–21–9
71	W	March 23, 1974	7–3	St. Louis Blues (1973–74)	41–21–9
72	L	March 24, 1974	3–6	@ Boston Bruins (1973–74)	41–22–9
73	W	March 26, 1974	4–3	@ Vancouver Canucks (1973–74)	42–22–9
74	W	March 29, 1974	4–3	@ California Golden Seals (1973–74)	43–22–9
75	W	March 30, 1974	5–2	@ Los Angeles Kings (1973–74)	44–22–9

April

Game	Result	Date	Score	Opponent	Record
76	L	April 3, 1974	3–5	Toronto Maple Leafs (1973–74)	44–23–9
77	W	April 6, 1974	6–2	Boston Bruins (1973–74)	45–23–9
78	L	April 7, 1974	4–6	@ New York Rangers (1973–74)	45–24–9

Legend: Win (2 points) Loss (0 points) Tie (1 point)

=== Playoffs ===
- 4/10/1974 New York Rangers 1–4
- 4/11/1974 New York Rangers 4–1
- 4/13/1974 at New York Rangers 4–2
- 4/14/1974 at New York Rangers 4–6
- 4/16/1974 New York Rangers 2–3
- 4/18/1974 at New York Rangers 2–5

== Awards and records ==
- Bill Masterton Memorial Trophy: Henri Richard, Montreal Canadiens

== Player statistics ==
=== Regular season ===
==== Scoring ====
Player	Pos	GP	G	A	Pts	PIM	+/-	PPG	SHG	GWG
Frank Mahovlich	LW	71	31	49	80	47	16	8	2	3
Yvan Cournoyer	RW	67	40	33	73	18	16	10	0	9
Pete Mahovlich	C	78	36	37	73	122	42	7	4	7
Jacques Lemaire	C	66	29	38	67	10	4	10	0	7
Guy Lafleur	RW	73	21	35	56	29	10	3	1	2
Henri Richard	C	75	19	36	55	28	7	1	0	3
Chuck Lefley	LW	74	23	31	54	34	9	1	2	2
Guy Lapointe	D	71	13	40	53	63	12	5	1	2
Steve Shutt	LW	70	15	20	35	17	19	3	0	1
Murray Wilson	LW	72	17	14	31	26	4	0	0	4
Larry Robinson	D	78	6	20	26	66	32	0	0	1
Claude Larose	RW	39	17	7	24	52	11	1	0	1
Jim Roberts	D/RW	67	8	16	24	39	27	0	1	2
Serge Savard	D	67	4	14	18	49	20	1	0	1
Yvon Lambert	LW	60	6	10	16	42	5	0	0	0
Pierre Bouchard	D	60	1	14	15	25	8	0	0	0
Jacques Laperriere	D	42	2	10	12	14	15	0	1	0
Dave Gardner	C	31	1	10	11	2	4	0	0	0
Bob Gainey	LW	66	3	7	10	34	−9	0	0	0
John Van Boxmeer	D	20	1	4	5	18	−3	1	0	0
Michel Larocque	G	27	0	2	2	0	0	0	0	0
Wayne Thomas	G	42	0	2	2	6	0	0	0	0
Rick Wilson	D	21	0	2	2	6	8	0	0	0
Glenn Goldup	RW	6	0	0	0	0	−1	0	0	0
Michel Plasse	G	15	0	0	0	0	0	0	0	0

==== Goaltending ====
Player	MIN	GP	W	L	T	GA	GAA	SO
Wayne Thomas	2410	42	23	12	5	111	2.76	1
Michel Larocque	1431	27	15	8	2	69	2.89	0
Michel Plasse	839	15	7	4	2	57	4.08	0
Team:	4680	78	45	24	9	237	3.04	1

=== Playoffs ===
==== Scoring ====
Player	Pos	GP	G	A	Pts	PIM	PPG	SHG	GWG
Steve Shutt	LW	6	5	3	8	9	1	0	0
Yvan Cournoyer	RW	6	5	2	7	2	0	0	2
Henri Richard	C	6	2	2	4	2	0	0	0
Jacques Lemaire	C	6	0	4	4	2	0	0	0
Pete Mahovlich	C	6	2	1	3	4	1	0	0
Frank Mahovlich	LW	6	1	2	3	0	0	0	0
Serge Savard	D	6	1	1	2	4	0	0	0
Pierre Bouchard	D	6	0	2	2	4	0	0	0
Guy Lapointe	D	6	0	2	2	4	0	0	0
Michel Larocque	G	6	0	2	2	0	0	0	0
Claude Larose	RW	5	0	2	2	11	0	0	0
Murray Wilson	LW	5	1	0	1	2	0	0	0
Guy Lafleur	RW	6	0	1	1	4	0	0	0
Chuck Lefley	LW	6	0	1	1	0	0	0	0
Larry Robinson	D	6	0	1	1	26	0	0	0
Bob Gainey	LW	6	0	0	0	6	0	0	0
Yvon Lambert	LW	5	0	0	0	7	0	0	0
Jim Roberts	D/RW	6	0	0	0	4	0	0	0
John Van Boxmeer	D	1	0	0	0	0	0	0	0

==== Goaltending ====
Player	MIN	GP	W	L	GA	GAA	SO
Michel Larocque	364	6	2	4	18	2.97	0
Team:	364	6	2	4	18	2.97	0

Note:

Pos = Position;GP = Games played; G = Goals; A = Assists; Pts = Points; PIM = Penalty minutes; +/- = Plus/minus; PPG = Power-play goals; SHG = Short-handed goals; GWG = Game-winning goals
Pos = Position;GP = Games played; Min, TOI = Minutes played; W = Wins; L = Losses; T,T/OT = Ties; OTL = Overtime losses; GA = Goals-against; GAA = Goals-against average; SO = Shutouts; SA = Shots against; SV = Shots saved;SV% = Save percentage;

== Draft picks ==
Round	#	Player	Position	Nationality	College/junior/club team (league)
1	8	Bob Gainey	Left wing	Canada	Peterborough Petes (OHA)
2	17	Glenn Goldup	Right wing	Canada	Toronto Marlboros (OHA)
2	22	Peter Marrin	Centre	Canada	Toronto Marlboros (OHA)
2	32	Ron Andruff	Centre	Canada	Flin Flon Bombers (WCHL)
3	37	Ed Humphreys	Goaltender	Canada	Saskatoon Blades (WCHL)
4	56	Alan Hangsleben	Defence	United States	University of North Dakota (NCAA)
4	64	Richard Latulippe	Centre	Canada	Quebec Remparts (QMJHL)
5	80	Gerard Gibbons	Defence	Canada	St. Mary's University (CIAU)
6	96	Denis Patry	Right wing	Canada	Drummondville Rangers (QMJHL)
7	112	Michel Belisle	Centre	Canada	Montreal Junior Canadiens (QMJHL)
8	128	Mario Desjardins	Left wing	Canada	Sherbrooke Castors (QMJHL)
9	143	Bob Wright	Right wing	Canada	Pembroke Lumber Kings (CJAHL)
10	158	Alain Labrecque	Centre	Canada	Trois-Rivières Draveurs (QMJHL)
11	166	Gord Halliday	Right wing	Canada	University of Pennsylvania (NCAA)
12	167	Cap Raeder	Goaltender	United States	University of New Hampshire (NCAA)
13	168	Louis Chiasson	Centre	Canada	Trois-Rivières Draveurs (QMJHL)

== See also ==
- 1973–74 NHL season
