= 1973–74 California Golden Seals season =

NHL season

1973–74 California Golden Seals
- Division: 8th West
- 1973–74 record: 13–55–10
- Home record: 11–18–10
- Road record: 2–37–0
- Goals for: 195
- Goals against: 342

Team information
- General manager: Fred Glover; Garry Young
- Coach: Fred Glover; Marshall Johnston
- Captain: Joey Johnston
- Alternate captains: Walt McKechnie; Gary Croteau; Ivan Boldirev
- Arena: Oakland Coliseum Arena

Team leaders
- Goals: Joey Johnston (27)
- Assists: Joey Johnston (40)
- Points: Joey Johnston (67)
- Penalty minutes: Bob Stewart (69)
- Wins: Gilles Meloche (9)
- Goals against average: Ted Tucker (3.39)

The 1973–74 California Golden Seals season was the Seals' seventh season in the NHL. With the continuing depletion of talent due to the World Hockey Association and a lack of interest from owner Charles O. Finley who put the team up for sale, the Seals had a miserable season and sank to a franchise low 36 points. In January 1974, the NHL bought the Seals from owner Charlie Finley for $6.585 million. With the league takeover, the players immediately returned to wearing black skates. The Seals would conclude the season with the worst record in the league.

== Offseason ==
=== Amateur draft ===
Round	Pick	Player	Nationality	College/Junior/Club team
3	34.	Jeff Jacques	Canada	St. Catharines Black Hawks (OHA)
4	50.	Ron Serafini	United States	St. Catharines Black Hawks (OHA)
5	66.	Jim Moxey	Canada	Hamilton Red Wings (OHA)
6	82.	Willie Trognitz	Canada	Thunder Bay (Junior)
7	98.	Paul Tantardini	Canada	Downsview Beavers (OPJHL)
8	114.	Bruce Greig	Canada	Vancouver Nats (WCHL)
9	130.	Larry Patey	Canada	Braintree Hawks (NEJHL)
10	145.	Doug Mahood	Canada	Sault Ste. Marie Greyhounds (OHA)
11	160.	Angie Moretto	Canada	University of Michigan (NCAA)

== Regular season ==
=== Final standings ===
West Division
		GP	W	L	T	GF	GA	DIFF	Pts
1	Philadelphia Flyers	78	50	16	12	273	164	+109	112
2	Chicago Black Hawks	78	41	14	23	272	164	+108	105
3	Los Angeles Kings	78	33	33	12	233	231	+2	78
4	Atlanta Flames	78	30	34	14	214	238	−24	74
5	Pittsburgh Penguins	78	28	41	9	242	273	−31	65
6	St. Louis Blues	78	26	40	12	206	248	−42	64
7	Minnesota North Stars	78	23	38	17	235	275	−40	63
8	California Golden Seals	78	13	55	10	195	342	−147	36

=== Record vs. opponents ===
==== Vs. West Division ====
1973–74 NHL records
Team	ATL	CAL	CHI	LAK	MIN	PHI	PIT	STL	Total
Atlanta	—	4–0–1	1–2–2	1–5	3–2	2–2–2	1–3–2	1–3–1	13–17–8
California	0–4–1	—	1–3–2	1–4	1–3–2	0–5	1–4	2–3–1	6–26–6
Chicago	2–1–2	3–1–2	—	3–1–2	3–1–1	2–2–1	5–1	3–0–2	21–7–10
Los Angeles	5–1	4–1	1–3–2	—	2–3–1	2–2–1	4–1	3–2	21–13–4
Minnesota	2–3	3–1–2	1–3–1	3–2–1	—	0–4–2	2–2–1	3–1–1	14–16–8
Philadelphia	2–2–2	5–0	2–2–1	2–2–1	4–0–2	—	3–2	6–0	24–8–6
Pittsburgh	3–1–2	4–1	1–5	1–4	2–2–1	2–3	—	2–3–1	15–19–4
St. Louis	3–1–1	3–2–1	0–3–2	2–3	1–3–1	0–6	3–2–1	—	12–20–6

==== Vs. East Division ====
1973–74 NHL records
Team	BOS	BUF	DET	MTL	NYI	NYR	TOR	VAN	Total
Atlanta	3–2	3–1–1	3–1–1	3–2	1–3–1	1–2–2	0–4–1	3–2	17–17–6
California	1–4	2–3	1–4	1–3–1	1–2–2	0–5	0–4–1	1–4	7–29–4
Chicago	2–0–3	0–2–3	4–0–1	2–2–1	2–1–2	3–1–1	3–1–1	4–0–1	20–7–13
Los Angeles	1–3–1	1–4	1–3–1	1–3–1	3–1–1	1–2–2	1–2–2	3–2	12–20–8
Minnesota	0–3–2	1–3–1	1–2–2	1–4	1–3–1	0–4–1	1–3–1	4–0–1	9–22–9
Philadelphia	1–3–1	5–0	5–0	2–2–1	5–0	1–2–2	4–0–1	3–1–1	26–8–6
Pittsburgh	0–5	3–2	2–2–1	0–4–1	2–1–2	1–4	1–3–1	4–1	13–22–5
St. Louis	1–4	2–2–1	1–3–1	2–3	2–2–1	1–3–1	2–2–1	3–1–1	14–20–6

== Schedule and results ==
1973–74 regular season
October

Game	Result	Date	Score	Opponent	Record
1	W	October 10, 1973	2–1	St. Louis Blues (1973–74)	1–0–0
2	W	October 12, 1973	3–2	Chicago Black Hawks (1973–74)	2–0–0
3	L	October 17, 1973	1–5	Philadelphia Flyers (1973–74)	2–1–0
4	L	October 20, 1973	3–5	@ Pittsburgh Penguins (1973–74)	2–2–0
5	L	October 21, 1973	2–11	@ Detroit Red Wings (1973–74)	2–3–0
6	W	October 24, 1973	7–3	Detroit Red Wings (1973–74)	3–3–0
7	L	October 26, 1973	1–3	Atlanta Flames (1973–74)	3–4–0
8	L	October 28, 1973	1–2	@ Philadelphia Flyers (1973–74)	3–5–0
9	L	October 31, 1973	2–3	@ Buffalo Sabres (1973–74)	3–6–0

November

Game	Result	Date	Score	Opponent	Record
10	L	November 1, 1973	2–7	@ Atlanta Flames (1973–74)	3–7–0
11	L	November 3, 1973	2–6	@ Montreal Canadiens (1973–74)	3–8–0
12	L	November 4, 1973	1–4	@ Boston Bruins (1973–74)	3–9–0
13	T	November 7, 1973	1–1	Chicago Black Hawks (1973–74)	3–9–1
14	W	November 9, 1973	6–3	Buffalo Sabres (1973–74)	4–9–1
15	L	November 14, 1973	1–4	Toronto Maple Leafs (1973–74)	4–10–1
16	L	November 16, 1973	1–2	Philadelphia Flyers (1973–74)	4–11–1
17	W	November 18, 1973	2–0	@ Buffalo Sabres (1973–74)	5–11–1
18	L	November 21, 1973	0–3	@ New York Rangers (1973–74)	5–12–1
19	L	November 24, 1973	3–6	@ Minnesota North Stars (1973–74)	5–13–1
20	L	November 25, 1973	2–3	@ Detroit Red Wings (1973–74)	5–14–1
21	W	November 28, 1973	5–1	Minnesota North Stars (1973–74)	6–14–1

December

Game	Result	Date	Score	Opponent	Record
22	L	December 1, 1973	2–3	@ Toronto Maple Leafs (1973–74)	6–15–1
23	L	December 2, 1973	1–5	@ Philadelphia Flyers (1973–74)	6–16–1
24	T	December 5, 1973	3–3	Atlanta Flames (1973–74)	6–16–2
25	W	December 7, 1973	4–3	Pittsburgh Penguins (1973–74)	7–16–2
26	L	December 9, 1973	3–6	@ New York Rangers (1973–74)	7–17–2
27	L	December 11, 1973	3–6	@ New York Islanders (1973–74)	7–18–2
28	L	December 12, 1973	1–9	@ Pittsburgh Penguins (1973–74)	7–19–2
29	T	December 14, 1973	2–2	Montreal Canadiens (1973–74)	7–19–3
30	L	December 16, 1973	3–5	@ Boston Bruins (1973–74)	7–20–3
31	L	December 18, 1973	1–4	@ Montreal Canadiens (1973–74)	7–21–3
32	L	December 19, 1973	3–5	@ Toronto Maple Leafs (1973–74)	7–22–3
33	T	December 23, 1973	2–2	Minnesota North Stars (1973–74)	7–22–4
34	L	December 26, 1973	4–6	@ Vancouver Canucks (1973–74)	7–23–4
35	T	December 28, 1973	4–4	New York Islanders (1973–74)	7–23–5
36	L	December 30, 1973	1–8	Boston Bruins (1973–74)	7–24–5

January

Game	Result	Date	Score	Opponent	Record
37	W	January 2, 1974	5–2	Los Angeles Kings (1973–74)	8–24–5
38	L	January 5, 1974	1–4	@ St. Louis Blues (1973–74)	8–25–5
39	L	January 6, 1974	4–9	@ Chicago Black Hawks (1973–74)	8–26–5
40	W	January 9, 1974	8–6	St. Louis Blues (1973–74)	9–26–5
41	L	January 11, 1974	2–3	Vancouver Canucks (1973–74)	9–27–5
42	L	January 13, 1974	2–7	New York Rangers (1973–74)	9–28–5
43	T	January 16, 1974	5–5	Toronto Maple Leafs (1973–74)	9–28–6
44	L	January 18, 1974	2–6	@ Atlanta Flames (1973–74)	9–29–6
45	L	January 20, 1974	4–6	@ Buffalo Sabres (1973–74)	9–30–6
46	L	January 22, 1974	3–4	@ New York Islanders (1973–74)	9–31–6
47	L	January 23, 1974	2–6	@ Detroit Red Wings (1973–74)	9–32–6
48	L	January 25, 1974	0–5	Philadelphia Flyers (1973–74)	9–33–6
49	T	January 27, 1974	2–2	Minnesota North Stars (1973–74)	9–33–7
50	L	January 30, 1974	4–6	@ St. Louis Blues (1973–74)	9–34–7
51	L	January 31, 1974	1–2	@ Chicago Black Hawks (1973–74)	9–35–7

February

Game	Result	Date	Score	Opponent	Record
52	L	February 2, 1974	1–3	@ Los Angeles Kings (1973–74)	9–36–7
53	W	February 3, 1974	4–2	New York Islanders (1973–74)	10–36–7
54	W	February 6, 1974	4–2	Vancouver Canucks (1973–74)	11–36–7
55	L	February 8, 1974	2–7	Buffalo Sabres (1973–74)	11–37–7
56	L	February 13, 1974	6–9	Boston Bruins (1973–74)	11–38–7
57	L	February 16, 1974	3–7	@ Pittsburgh Penguins (1973–74)	11–39–7
58	L	February 17, 1974	1–7	@ Minnesota North Stars (1973–74)	11–40–7
59	L	February 20, 1974	0–3	@ Chicago Black Hawks (1973–74)	11–41–7
60	L	February 22, 1974	3–4	New York Rangers (1973–74)	11–42–7
61	T	February 27, 1974	2–2	St. Louis Blues (1973–74)	11–42–8

March

Game	Result	Date	Score	Opponent	Record
62	W	March 2, 1974	4–3	@ Montreal Canadiens (1973–74)	12–42–8
63	L	March 3, 1974	2–8	@ New York Rangers (1973–74)	12–43–8
64	L	March 5, 1974	1–2	@ Los Angeles Kings (1973–74)	12–44–8
65	T	March 6, 1974	3–3	Chicago Black Hawks (1973–74)	12–44–9
66	W	March 10, 1974	6–2	Boston Bruins (1973–74)	13–44–9
67	L	March 13, 1974	2–5	Detroit Red Wings (1973–74)	13–45–9
68	L	March 15, 1974	1–6	Pittsburgh Penguins (1973–74)	13–46–9
69	L	March 19, 1974	3–6	@ Minnesota North Stars (1973–74)	13–47–9
70	L	March 21, 1974	3–6	@ Los Angeles Kings (1973–74)	13–48–9
71	L	March 22, 1974	2–3	Toronto Maple Leafs (1973–74)	13–49–9
72	L	March 24, 1974	1–7	Los Angeles Kings (1973–74)	13–50–9
73	T	March 27, 1974	2–2	New York Islanders (1973–74)	13–50–10
74	L	March 29, 1974	3–4	Montreal Canadiens (1973–74)	13–51–10
75	L	March 31, 1974	0–7	@ Vancouver Canucks (1973–74)	13–52–10

April

Game	Result	Date	Score	Opponent	Record
76	L	April 2, 1974	3–5	@ St. Louis Blues (1973–74)	13–53–10
77	L	April 3, 1974	1–4	Vancouver Canucks (1973–74)	13–54–10
78	L	April 5, 1974	2–4	Atlanta Flames (1973–74)	13–55–10

Legend: Win (2 points) Loss (0 points) Tie (1 point)

== Player statistics ==
=== Skaters ===
Note: GP = Games played; G = Goals; A = Assists; Pts = Points; PIM = Penalties in minutes

		Regular season					Playoffs
Player	#	GP	G	A	Pts	PIM	GP	G	A	Pts	PIM
Joey Johnston	22	78	27	40	67	67	–	–	–	–	–
Ivan Boldirev	9	78	25	31	56	22	–	–	–	–	–
Walt McKechnie	8	63	23	29	52	14	–	–	–	–	–
Reggie Leach	7	78	22	24	46	34	–	–	–	–	–
Gary Croteau	18	76	14	21	35	16	–	–	–	–	–
Stan Gilbertson	15	76	18	12	30	39	–	–	–	–	–
Craig Patrick	14	59	10	20	30	17	–	–	–	–	–
Hilliard Graves	17	64	11	18	29	48	–	–	–	–	–
Morris Mott	20	77	9	17	26	33	–	–	–	–	–
Ted McAneeley	23	72	4	20	24	62	–	–	–	–	–
Marshall Johnston	2	50	2	16	18	24	–	–	–	–	–
Stan Weir	21	58	9	7	16	10	–	–	–	–	–
Pete Laframboise	24	65	7	7	14	14	–	–	–	–	–
Ray McKay	3	72	2	12	14	49	–	–	–	–	–
Ron Huston	11	23	3	10	13	0	–	–	–	–	–
Terry Murray	5	58	0	12	12	48	–	–	–	–	–
Brent Meeke	25	18	1	9	10	4	–	–	–	–	–
Rick Kessell	12	51	2	6	8	4	–	–	–	–	–
Bob Stewart	6	47	2	5	7	69	–	–	–	–	–
Paul Shakes	4	21	0	4	4	12	–	–	–	–	–
Barry Cummins	4	36	1	2	3	39	–	–	–	–	–
Del Hall	12	2	2	0	2	2	–	–	–	–	–
Lyle Bradley	15	4	1	0	1	2	–	–	–	–	–
Marv Edwards	1	14	0	1	1	4	–	–	–	–	–
Gilles Meloche	27	47	0	1	1	2	–	–	–	–	–
Hartland Monahan	17	1	0	0	0	0	–	–	–	–	–
Larry Patey	17	1	0	0	0	0	–	–	–	–	–
Bruce Greig	28	1	0	0	0	4	–	–	–	–	–
Gary Holt	17	1	0	0	0	0	–	–	–	–	–
Dave Hrechkosy	19	2	0	0	0	0	–	–	–	–	–
Wayne King	24	2	0	0	0	0	–	–	–	–	–
Ron Serafini	2	2	0	0	0	2	–	–	–	–	–
Gary Coalter	15	4	0	0	0	0	–	–	–	–	–
Ted Tucker	30	5	0	0	0	0	–	–	–	–	–
Bob Champoux	28	17	0	0	0	0	–	–	–	–	–

=== Goaltenders ===
Note: GP = Games played; TOI = Time on ice (minutes); W = Wins; L = Losses; T = Ties; GA = Goals against; SO = Shutouts; GAA = Goals against average

		Regular season								Playoffs
Player	#	GP	TOI	W	L	T	GA	SO	GAA	GP	TOI	W	L	GA	SO	GAA
Ted Tucker	30	5	177	1	1	1	10	0	3.39	–	–	–	–	–	–	-.--
Marv Edwards	1	14	780	1	10	1	51	0	3.92	–	–	–	–	–	–	-.--
Gilles Meloche	27	47	2800	9	33	5	198	1	4.24	–	–	–	–	–	–	-.--
Bob Champoux	28	17	923	2	11	3	80	0	5.20	–	–	–	–	–	–	-.--

== Transactions ==
The Seals were involved in the following transactions during the 1973–74 season:

=== Trades ===
May 11, 1973	To California Golden Seals Gary Coalter	To New York Rangers cash
June 10, 1973	To California Golden Seals Ted Tucker	To Atlanta Flames cash

=== Additions and subtractions ===
Additions
Player	Former team	Via
Ray McKay	Buffalo Sabres	Intra-league Draft (1973–06–12)
Rick Kessell	Pittsburgh Penguins	Intra-league Draft (1973–06–13)
Gary Holt	Port Huron Wings (IHL)	free agency (1973–09)
Dave Hrechkosy	Rochester Americans (AHL)	free agency (1973–09)
Bob Girard	Amqui Aces (QSHL)	free agency (1973–09)
Bob Champoux	San Diego Gulls (WHL)	free agency (1973–11)

Subtractions
Player	New team	Via
Lyle Carter	Minnesota North Stars	Reverse Draft (1973–06–13)
Al Simmons	San Diego Gulls (WHL)	Reverse Draft (1973–06–13)
Jim Jones	Chicago Cougars (WHA)	free agency (1973–09)
