= Gary Holt =

Gary Holt may refer to:

- Gary Holt (footballer) (born 1973), Scottish former footballer and now football coach
- Gary Holt (musician) (born 1964), American guitarist
- Gary Holt (ice hockey) (born 1952), former Canadian professional ice hockey forward
