= 1973–74 Minnesota North Stars season =

Ice hockey season

1973–74 Minnesota North Stars
- Division: 7th West
- 1973–74 record: 23–38–17
- Home record: 18–15–6
- Road record: 5–23–11
- Goals for: 235
- Goals against: 275

Team information
- General manager: Wren Blair
- Coach: Jack Gordon; Parker MacDonald
- Captain: Ted Harris (until Nov 7, 1973)
- Alternate captains: J. P. Parise; Barry Gibbs; Bill Goldsworthy
- Arena: Met Center

Team leaders
- Goals: Bill Goldsworthy (48)
- Assists: Dennis Hextall (62)
- Points: Dennis Hextall (82)
- Penalty minutes: Dennis O'Brien (166)
- Wins: Cesare Maniago (12)
- Goals against average: Gump Worsley (3.23)

The 1973–74 Minnesota North Stars season was the North Stars' seventh season.

Coached by Jack Gordon (3–8–6) and Parker MacDonald (20–30–11), the team compiled a record of 23–38–17 for 63 points, to finish the regular season 7th in the West Division and failed to qualify for the playoffs.

== Regular season ==
=== Final standings ===
West Division
		GP	W	L	T	GF	GA	DIFF	Pts
1	Philadelphia Flyers	78	50	16	12	273	164	+109	112
2	Chicago Black Hawks	78	41	14	23	272	164	+108	105
3	Los Angeles Kings	78	33	33	12	233	231	+2	78
4	Atlanta Flames	78	30	34	14	214	238	−24	74
5	Pittsburgh Penguins	78	28	41	9	242	273	−31	65
6	St. Louis Blues	78	26	40	12	206	248	−42	64
7	Minnesota North Stars	78	23	38	17	235	275	−40	63
8	California Golden Seals	78	13	55	10	195	342	−147	36

=== Record vs. opponents ===
==== Vs. West Division ====
1973–74 NHL records
Team	ATL	CAL	CHI	LAK	MIN	PHI	PIT	STL	Total
Atlanta	—	4–0–1	1–2–2	1–5	3–2	2–2–2	1–3–2	1–3–1	13–17–8
California	0–4–1	—	1–3–2	1–4	1–3–2	0–5	1–4	2–3–1	6–26–6
Chicago	2–1–2	3–1–2	—	3–1–2	3–1–1	2–2–1	5–1	3–0–2	21–7–10
Los Angeles	5–1	4–1	1–3–2	—	2–3–1	2–2–1	4–1	3–2	21–13–4
Minnesota	2–3	3–1–2	1–3–1	3–2–1	—	0–4–2	2–2–1	3–1–1	14–16–8
Philadelphia	2–2–2	5–0	2–2–1	2–2–1	4–0–2	—	3–2	6–0	24–8–6
Pittsburgh	3–1–2	4–1	1–5	1–4	2–2–1	2–3	—	2–3–1	15–19–4
St. Louis	3–1–1	3–2–1	0–3–2	2–3	1–3–1	0–6	3–2–1	—	12–20–6

==== Vs. East Division ====
1973–74 NHL records
Team	BOS	BUF	DET	MTL	NYI	NYR	TOR	VAN	Total
Atlanta	3–2	3–1–1	3–1–1	3–2	1–3–1	1–2–2	0–4–1	3–2	17–17–6
California	1–4	2–3	1–4	1–3–1	1–2–2	0–5	0–4–1	1–4	7–29–4
Chicago	2–0–3	0–2–3	4–0–1	2–2–1	2–1–2	3–1–1	3–1–1	4–0–1	20–7–13
Los Angeles	1–3–1	1–4	1–3–1	1–3–1	3–1–1	1–2–2	1–2–2	3–2	12–20–8
Minnesota	0–3–2	1–3–1	1–2–2	1–4	1–3–1	0–4–1	1–3–1	4–0–1	9–22–9
Philadelphia	1–3–1	5–0	5–0	2–2–1	5–0	1–2–2	4–0–1	3–1–1	26–8–6
Pittsburgh	0–5	3–2	2–2–1	0–4–1	2–1–2	1–4	1–3–1	4–1	13–22–5
St. Louis	1–4	2–2–1	1–3–1	2–3	2–2–1	1–3–1	2–2–1	3–1–1	14–20–6

== Schedule and results ==
1973–74 regular season
October

Game	Result	Date	Score	Opponent	Record
1	L	October 10, 1973	2–5	Montreal Canadiens (1973–74)	0–1–0
2	L	October 13, 1973	3–4	Buffalo Sabres (1973–74)	0–2–0
3	T	October 14, 1973	1–1	@ Chicago Black Hawks (1973–74)	0–2–1
4	L	October 17, 1973	2–4	Pittsburgh Penguins (1973–74)	0–3–1
5	T	October 18, 1973	4–4	@ Detroit Red Wings (1973–74)	0–3–2
6	T	October 20, 1973	4–4	St. Louis Blues (1973–74)	0–3–3
7	T	October 23, 1973	2–2	@ Toronto Maple Leafs (1973–74)	0–3–4
8	T	October 25, 1973	1–1	@ New York Islanders (1973–74)	0–3–5
9	L	October 27, 1973	2–4	@ Montreal Canadiens (1973–74)	0–4–5
10	T	October 28, 1973	3–3	@ Boston Bruins (1973–74)	0–4–6
11	L	October 31, 1973	0–5	Boston Bruins (1973–74)	0–5–6

November

Game	Result	Date	Score	Opponent	Record
12	W	November 3, 1973	5–4	Chicago Black Hawks (1973–74)	1–5–6
13	W	November 7, 1973	5–2	Los Angeles Kings (1973–74)	2–5–6
14	L	November 10, 1973	2–4	Detroit Red Wings (1973–74)	2–6–6
15	L	November 13, 1973	2–5	@ Pittsburgh Penguins (1973–74)	2–7–6
16	W	November 14, 1973	6–3	Vancouver Canucks (1973–74)	3–7–6
17	L	November 17, 1973	3–6	New York Rangers (1973–74)	3–8–6
18	L	November 21, 1973	3–4	Montreal Canadiens (1973–74)	3–9–6
19	L	November 22, 1973	1–2	@ St. Louis Blues (1973–74)	3–10–6
20	W	November 24, 1973	6–3	California Golden Seals (1973–74)	4–10–6
21	L	November 28, 1973	1–5	@ California Golden Seals (1973–74)	4–11–6
22	W	November 30, 1973	5–4	@ Vancouver Canucks (1973–74)	5–11–6

December

Game	Result	Date	Score	Opponent	Record
23	T	December 1, 1973	1–1	@ Los Angeles Kings (1973–74)	5–11–7
24	L	December 6, 1973	1–4	Toronto Maple Leafs (1973–74)	5–12–7
25	W	December 8, 1973	3–0	Detroit Red Wings (1973–74)	6–12–7
26	L	December 9, 1973	3–5	@ Chicago Black Hawks (1973–74)	6–13–7
27	W	December 11, 1973	6–3	Los Angeles Kings (1973–74)	7–13–7
28	L	December 13, 1973	2–4	@ Boston Bruins (1973–74)	7–14–7
29	W	December 15, 1973	4–3	Buffalo Sabres (1973–74)	8–14–7
30	W	December 19, 1973	4–2	Atlanta Flames (1973–74)	9–14–7
31	L	December 22, 1973	2–5	@ Los Angeles Kings (1973–74)	9–15–7
32	T	December 23, 1973	2–2	@ California Golden Seals (1973–74)	9–15–8
33	W	December 26, 1973	1–0	New York Islanders (1973–74)	10–15–8
34	W	December 28, 1973	5–3	@ Vancouver Canucks (1973–74)	11–15–8
35	L	December 30, 1973	3–4	@ New York Rangers (1973–74)	11–16–8

January

Game	Result	Date	Score	Opponent	Record
36	W	January 2, 1974	8–4	Pittsburgh Penguins (1973–74)	12–16–8
37	T	January 5, 1974	3–3	Philadelphia Flyers (1973–74)	12–16–9
38	L	January 6, 1974	6–9	@ Detroit Red Wings (1973–74)	12–17–9
39	T	January 9, 1974	2–2	Detroit Red Wings (1973–74)	12–17–10
40	L	January 10, 1974	4–7	@ Philadelphia Flyers (1973–74)	12–18–10
41	L	January 12, 1974	3–4	New York Islanders (1973–74)	12–19–10
42	W	January 15, 1974	5–3	@ St. Louis Blues (1973–74)	13–19–10
43	L	January 17, 1974	1–6	@ Montreal Canadiens (1973–74)	13–20–10
44	W	January 19, 1974	5–3	Toronto Maple Leafs (1973–74)	14–20–10
45	L	January 23, 1974	1–3	@ Los Angeles Kings (1973–74)	14–21–10
46	W	January 25, 1974	5–4	@ Vancouver Canucks (1973–74)	15–21–10
47	T	January 27, 1974	2–2	@ California Golden Seals (1973–74)	15–21–11
48	L	January 31, 1974	1–3	@ Toronto Maple Leafs (1973–74)	15–22–11

February

Game	Result	Date	Score	Opponent	Record
49	L	February 2, 1974	1–3	New York Rangers (1973–74)	15–23–11
50	T	February 3, 1974	5–5	@ New York Rangers (1973–74)	15–23–12
51	L	February 5, 1974	2–6	@ New York Islanders (1973–74)	15–24–12
52	W	February 6, 1974	4–3	Montreal Canadiens (1973–74)	16–24–12
53	L	February 9, 1974	1–4	@ Toronto Maple Leafs (1973–74)	16–25–12
54	L	February 10, 1974	0–4	@ Boston Bruins (1973–74)	16–26–12
55	T	February 13, 1974	3–3	Vancouver Canucks (1973–74)	16–26–13
56	W	February 16, 1974	4–2	@ St. Louis Blues (1973–74)	17–26–13
57	W	February 17, 1974	7–1	California Golden Seals (1973–74)	18–26–13
58	T	February 20, 1974	5–5	Boston Bruins (1973–74)	18–26–14
59	L	February 23, 1974	3–5	Atlanta Flames (1973–74)	18–27–14
60	L	February 27, 1974	1–3	Chicago Black Hawks (1973–74)	18–28–14
61	T	February 28, 1974	2–2	@ Philadelphia Flyers (1973–74)	18–28–15

March

Game	Result	Date	Score	Opponent	Record
62	L	March 2, 1974	1–3	New York Rangers (1973–74)	18–29–15
63	T	March 6, 1974	4–4	Buffalo Sabres (1973–74)	18–29–16
64	L	March 8, 1974	1–3	@ Atlanta Flames (1973–74)	18–30–16
65	W	March 10, 1974	8–1	St. Louis Blues (1973–74)	19–30–16
66	W	March 13, 1974	5–1	Atlanta Flames (1973–74)	20–30–16
67	L	March 16, 1974	2–4	Philadelphia Flyers (1973–74)	20–31–16
68	L	March 17, 1974	2–5	@ Buffalo Sabres (1973–74)	20–32–16
69	W	March 19, 1974	6–3	California Golden Seals (1973–74)	21–32–16
70	W	March 23, 1974	5–1	Pittsburgh Penguins (1973–74)	22–32–16
71	L	March 24, 1974	0–6	@ Chicago Black Hawks (1973–74)	22–33–16
72	W	March 26, 1974	5–1	Los Angeles Kings (1973–74)	23–33–16
73	T	March 27, 1974	3–3	@ Pittsburgh Penguins (1973–74)	23–33–17
74	L	March 30, 1974	1–4	@ Atlanta Flames (1973–74)	23–34–17
75	L	March 31, 1974	1–6	@ Buffalo Sabres (1973–74)	23–35–17

April

Game	Result	Date	Score	Opponent	Record
76	L	April 2, 1974	3–6	Philadelphia Flyers (1973–74)	23–36–17
77	L	April 6, 1974	2–4	@ New York Islanders (1973–74)	23–37–17
78	L	April 7, 1974	2–6	@ Philadelphia Flyers (1973–74)	23–38–17

Legend: Win (2 points) Loss (0 points) Tie (1 point)

== Draft picks ==
Minnesota's draft picks at the 1973 NHL amateur draft held at the Queen Elizabeth Hotel in Montreal.

Round	#	Player	Nationality	College/Junior/Club team (League)
2	18	Blake Dunlop	Canada	Ottawa 67's (OHA)
2	25	John Rogers	Canada	Edmonton Oil Kings (WCHL)
3	41	Rick Chinnick	Canada	Peterborough Petes (OHA)
4	57	Tom Colley	Canada	Sudbury Wolves (OHA)
5	73	Lowell Ostlund	Canada	Saskatoon Blades (WCHL)
6	89	David Lee	Canada	Ottawa 67's (OHA)
7	105	Lou Nistico	Canada	London Knights (OHA)
8	121	George Beveridge	Canada	Kitchener Rangers (OHA)
9	136	Jim Johnston	Canada	Peterborough Petes (OHA)
10	152	Sam Clegg	Canada	Medicine Hat Tigers (WCHL)
11	161	Russ Wiechnik	Canada	Calgary Centennials (WCHL)
11	163	Max Hansen	United States	Sudbury Wolves (OHA)

== See also ==
- 1973–74 NHL season
