= Ted Tucker =

Canadian ice hockey player (b. 1949)

- Born: May 7, 1949 (age 75); Fort William, Ontario, Canada
- Height: 5 ft 11 in (180 cm)
- Weight: 165 lb (75 kg; 11 st 11 lb)
- Position: Goaltender
- Shot: Left
- Played for: California Golden Seals
- Playing career: 1969–1981

Edward William Tucker (born May 7, 1949 in Fort William, Ontario), is a Canadian retired professional ice hockey goaltender who briefly played for the California Golden Seals of the National Hockey League in the 1973–74 season.

== Career statistics ==
=== Regular season and playoffs ===
			Regular season									Playoffs
Season	Team	League	GP	W	L	T	MIN	GA	SO	GAA	SV%	GP	W	L	MIN	GA	SO	GAA	SV%
1965–66	Fort William Canadiens	TBJHL	24	—	—	—	1486	67	0	2.74	—	—	—	—	—	—	—	—	—
1965–66	Fort William Canadiens	M-Cup	—	—	—	—	—	—	—	—	—	1	0	1	40	6	0	9.00	—
1966–67	Fort William Canadiens	TBJHL	30	23	4	3	1800	88	3	2.93	—	—	—	—	—	—	—	—	—
1967–68	Montreal Junior Canadiens	OHA	5	—	—	—	250	16	0	3.84	—	1	1	0	30	1	0	2.00	—
1968–69	Montreal Junior Canadiens	OHA	27	—	—	—	1600	89	2	3.34	—	2	0	1	80	7	0	5.38	—
1969–70	Clinton Comets	EHL	69	—	—	—	4140	211	6	3.06	—	17	12	5	1020	47	2	2.77	—
1970–71	Clinton Comets	EHL	74	31	32	11	4440	231	4	3.12	—	5	1	4	300	20	0	4.00	—
1970–71	Syracuse Blazers	EHL	—	—	—	—	—	—	—	—	—	2	0	2	230	14	0	7.00	—
1971–72	Clinton Comets	EHL	43	—	—	—	2610	142	2	3.26	—	3	1	2	220	12	0	3.27	—
1972–73	Salt Lake Golden Eagles	WHL	33	14	7	10	1919	112	1	3.50	—	7	2	5	427	26	0	3.63	—
1973–74	California Golden Seals	NHL	5	1	1	1	177	10	0	3.39	.892	—	—	—	—	—	—	—	—
1973–74	Salt Lake Golden Eagles	WHL	13	6	6	0	713	61	0	5.13	—	3	0	3	160	12	0	4.49	—
1974–75	Toledo Goaldiggers	IHL	39	—	—	—	2166	114	2	3.16	—	11	—	—	522	31	1	3.56	—
1975–76	Port Huron Flags	IHL	—	—	—	—	—	—	—	—	—	—	—	—	—	—	—	—	—
1975–76	Columbus Owls	IHL	3	—	—	—	—	—	0	—	—	—	—	—	—	—	—	—	—
1975–76	Toledo Goaldiggers	IHL	21	—	—	—	—	—	0	—	—	1	0	1	60	5	0	5.00	—
1976–77	Toledo Goaldiggers	IHL	3	—	—	—	164	12	0	4.39	—	—	—	—	—	—	—	—	—
1976–77	Muskegon Mohawks	IHL	46	—	—	—	2478	154	2	3.73	—	3	—	—	179	10	0	3.35	—
1977–78	Toledo Goaldiggers	IHL	26	—	—	—	1277	76	0	3.57	—	—	—	—	—	—	—	—	—
1977–78	Port Huron Flags	IHL	15	—	—	—	844	66	0	4.69	—	1	0	0	17	2	0	7.06	—
1979–80	Dayton Gems	IHL	23	—	—	—	1189	91	0	4.59	—	—	—	—	—	—	—	—	—
1979–80	Saginaw Gears	IHL	12	—	—	—	691	33	0	2.87	—	4	—	—	205	11	0	3.22	—
1980–81	Saginaw Gears	IHL	40	—	—	—	2068	126	1	3.66	—	—	—	—	—	—	—	—	—
NHL totals			5	1	1	1	177	10	0	3.39	.892	—	—	—	—	—	—	—	—
