= Randy Holt =

Canadian ice hockey player

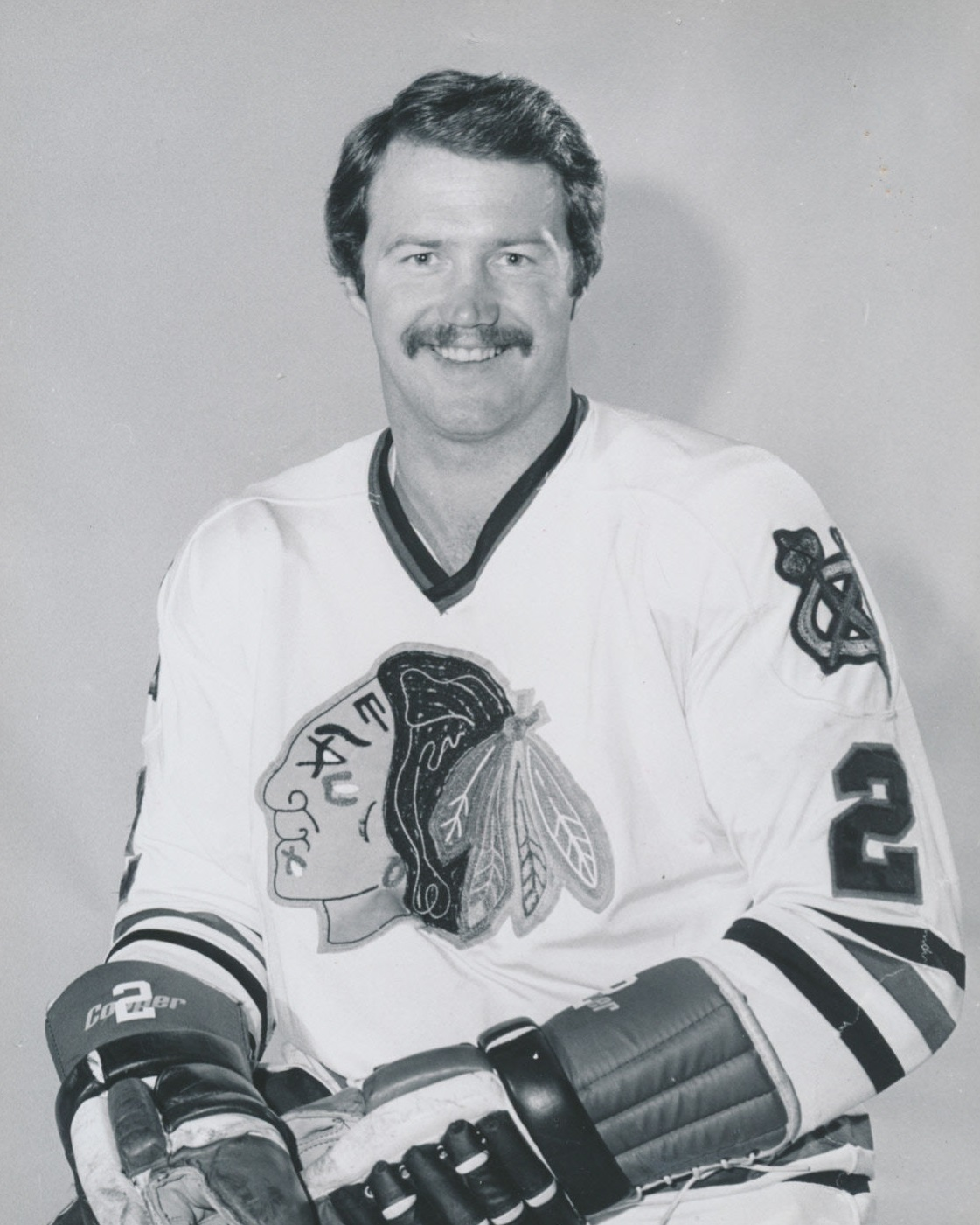
- Holt in 1977
- Born: January 15, 1953 (age 73) Pembroke, Ontario, Canada
- Height: 5 ft 11 in (180 cm)
- Weight: 185 lb (84 kg; 13 st 3 lb)
- Position: Defence
- Shot: Right
- Played for: Chicago Black Hawks; Cleveland Barons; Vancouver Canucks; Los Angeles Kings; Calgary Flames; Washington Capitals; Philadelphia Flyers
- NHL draft: 45th overall, 1973; Chicago Black Hawks
- WHA draft: 41st overall, 1973; New England Whalers
- Playing career: 1974–1984

Stewart Randall Holt (born January 15, 1953) is a Canadian former professional ice hockey defenceman who spent ten seasons in the National Hockey League (NHL). Known as one of the toughest players in the sport during his career, he still holds the NHL single-game record for penalty minutes.

== Playing career ==
Holt was born in Pembroke, Ontario. After playing his junior hockey with the Sudbury Wolves, Holt was selected 45th overall in the 1973 NHL Amateur Draft by the Chicago Black Hawks. He spent most of the next four seasons in the Central Hockey League with the Dallas Black Hawks, Chicago's top minor league affiliate, although he was a frequent callup to Chicago, appearing in 42 games over that stretch. He established himself as one of the toughest players in minor pro, recording a CHL record 411 penalty minutes in 1974–75, but also showed a fair amount of skill and was named a CHL First-Team All-Star in 1976 after scoring 52 points from the blueline.

Just after the start of the 1977–78 season, Holt was dealt to the lowly Cleveland Barons and finally received a chance to stick in the NHL full-time. He finished the season with 1 goal and 4 assists in 52 games, along with 249 penalty minutes. At the end of the season, however, the Barons ceased operations and Holt was claimed by the Vancouver Canucks in the resulting dispersal draft.

Holt appeared in only 22 games for the Canucks before being dealt to the Los Angeles Kings midway through the 1978–79 campaign. He finished the season with 1 goal and 9 assists for a career high 10 points, along with 282 penalty minutes, in 58 games between Los Angeles and Vancouver. Included in his penalty total was an NHL record 67 in a March 11, 1979 game against the Philadelphia Flyers.

After another season in Los Angeles, Holt was traded to the Calgary Flames for the 1980–81 season. He played some of the best hockey of his career in the 1981 playoffs, recording 2 goals and 4 points in 13 games to help the Flames reach the Stanley Cup semi-finals. For the 1981–82 season, he was dealt to the Washington Capitals, where he set a club record with 250 penalty minutes. He broke his own record with a league-leading 275 penalty minutes the following season, and also appeared in a career-high 70 games, recording 8 assists. He closed out his career with a 26-game stint for the Philadelphia Flyers in 1983–84 before retiring.

In 395 NHL games, Holt scored 4 goals and 37 assists, and amassed 1,438 penalty minutes.

His older brother Gary Holt also played in the NHL during the 1970s.

== March 11, 1979 penalty record ==
The toughest player on the Los Angeles Kings, Holt had been acquired midway through the 1978–79 season to add muscle to a skilled Kings team, and was expected to be a factor when the team travelled to Philadelphia to face off against the fearsome Flyers. After picking up a minor penalty early in the first period, Holt fought Philadelphia enforcer Frank Bathe at 14:58 of the first period, picking up 20 minutes in penalties. However, Holt felt that he had been a victim of a cheap shot from Flyers' agitator Ken Linseman earlier in the game, and took it out on Flyer Blake Dunlop when the two came together in the corner. At the end of the first period, the Flyers confronted Holt as he came out of the penalty box, which escalated into a bench-clearing brawl. Although he was only involved in a fight with Flyer Paul Holmgren, who initiated the conflict, Holt was assessed a further 45 minutes in penalties for his actions during the brawl, including a triple game misconduct, bringing his game total to 67, shattering the previous NHL record of 48 set by Jim Dorey in 1968. He was also suspended three games by the league for his actions.

== Career statistics ==
=== Regular season and playoffs ===
Bold indicates led league

			Regular season					Playoffs
Season	Team	League	GP	G	A	Pts	PIM	GP	G	A	Pts	PIM
1970–71	Sudbury Cub-Wolves	NOJHL	35	4	15	19	249	8	2	1	3	106
1970–71	Niagara Falls Flyers	OHA	35	5	7	12	178	—	—	—	—	—
1971–72	Niagara Falls Flyers	OHA	27	3	5	8	118	6	0	3	3	31
1972–73	Sudbury Wolves	OHA	55	7	42	49	294	4	2	0	2	34
1973–74	Dallas Black Hawks	CHL	66	3	15	18	222	10	1	2	3	51
1974–75	Chicago Black Hawks	NHL	12	0	1	1	13	—	—	—	—	—
1974–75	Dallas Black Hawks	CHL	65	8	32	40	411	10	0	7	7	86
1975–76	Chicago Black Hawks	NHL	12	0	0	0	13	—	—	—	—	—
1975–76	Dallas Black Hawks	CHL	64	6	46	52	161	8	3	2	5	51
1976–77	Chicago Black Hawks	NHL	12	0	3	3	14	2	0	0	0	7
1976–77	Dallas Black Hawks	CHL	30	0	10	10	90	3	0	1	1	25
1977–78	Chicago Black Hawks	NHL	6	0	0	0	20	—	—	—	—	—
1977–78	Cleveland Barons	NHL	48	1	4	5	229	—	—	—	—	—
1978–79	Vancouver Canucks	NHL	22	1	3	4	80	—	—	—	—	—
1978–79	Los Angeles Kings	NHL	36	0	6	6	202	2	0	0	0	4
1979–80	Los Angeles Kings	NHL	42	0	1	1	94	—	—	—	—	—
1980–81	Calgary Flames	NHL	48	0	5	5	165	13	2	2	4	52
1981–82	Calgary Flames	NHL	8	0	0	0	9	—	—	—	—	—
1981–82	Washington Capitals	NHL	53	2	6	8	250	—	—	—	—	—
1982–83	Washington Capitals	NHL	70	0	8	8	**275**	4	0	1	1	20
1983–84	Philadelphia Flyers	NHL	26	0	0	0	74	—	—	—	—	—
NHL totals			395	4	37	41	1438	21	2	3	5	83
