= 1973–74 New York Rangers season =

NHL hockey team season

1973–74 New York Rangers
- Division: 3rd East
- 1973–74 record: 40–24–14
- Home record: 26–7–6
- Road record: 14–17–8
- Goals for: 300
- Goals against: 251

Team information
- General manager: Emile Francis
- Coach: Larry Popein; Emile Francis
- Captain: Vic Hadfield
- Alternate captains: Brad Park; Rod Gilbert
- Arena: Madison Square Garden

Team leaders
- Goals: Rod Gilbert (36)
- Assists: Brad Park (57)
- Points: Brad Park (82)
- Penalty minutes: Brad Park (148)
- Wins: Ed Giacomin (30)
- Goals against average: Ed Giacomin (3.07)

The 1973–74 New York Rangers season was the franchise's 48th season. The Rangers compiled 94 points during the regular season and finished third in the East Division. The team made the Stanley Cup playoffs, where New York defeated the Montreal Canadiens 4–2 in the quarter-finals. The Rangers then lost in a seven-game semi-finals series to the Philadelphia Flyers, who went on to win the Stanley Cup that season.

== Offseason ==
- On July 27, 1973, E. Michael Burke handed in his resignation to the New York Yankees, so that he could become president of Madison Square Garden. This would make Burke the president of the New York Rangers hockey club and the New York Knicks basketball club.

== Regular season ==
=== Final standings ===
East Division
		GP	W	L	T	GF	GA	DIFF	Pts
1	Boston Bruins	78	52	17	9	349	221	+128	113
2	Montreal Canadiens	78	45	24	9	293	240	+53	99
3	New York Rangers	78	40	24	14	300	251	+49	94
4	Toronto Maple Leafs	78	35	27	16	274	230	+44	86
5	Buffalo Sabres	78	32	34	12	242	250	−8	76
6	Detroit Red Wings	78	29	39	10	255	319	−64	68
7	Vancouver Canucks	78	24	43	11	224	296	−72	59
8	New York Islanders	78	19	41	18	182	247	−65	56

=== Record vs. opponents ===
==== Vs. East Division ====
1973–74 NHL records
Team	BOS	BUF	DET	MTL	NYI	NYR	TOR	VAN	Total
Boston	—	4–1	4–1–1	4–2	4–1	4–1	4–2	4–0–1	28–8–2
Buffalo	1–4	—	5–1	0–3–2	3–0–2	2–2–1	2–3–1	2–4	15–17–6
Detroit	1–4–1	1–5	—	2–3	4–1	2–3–1	2–2–1	2–3	14–21–3
Montreal	2–4	3–0–2	3–2	—	4–1–1	4–2	2–3	4–0–1	22–12–4
N.Y. Islanders	1–4	0–3–2	1–4	1–4–1	—	1–4	0–4–2	2–1–3	6–24–8
N.Y. Rangers	1–4	2–2–1	3–2–1	2–4	4–1	—	1–2–2	4–1–1	17–16–5
Toronto	2–4	3–2–1	2–2–1	3–2	4–0–2	2–1–2	—	0–4–1	16–15–7
Vancouver	0–4–1	4–2	3–2	0–4–1	1–2–3	1–4–1	4–0–1	—	13–18–7

==== Vs. West Division ====
1973–74 NHL records
Team	ATL	CAL	CHI	LAK	MIN	PHI	PIT	STL	Total
Boston	2–3	4–1	0–2–3	3–1–1	3–0–2	3–1–1	5–0	4–1	24–9–7
Buffalo	1–3–1	3–2	2–0–3	4–1	3–1–1	0–5	2–3	2–2–1	17–17–6
Detroit	1–3–1	4–1	0–4–1	3–1–1	2–1–2	0–5	2–2–1	3–1–1	15–18–7
Montreal	2–3	3–1–1	2–2–1	3–1–1	4–1	2–2–1	4–0–1	3–2	23–12–5
N.Y. Islanders	3–1–1	2–1–2	1–2–2	1–3–1	3–1–1	0–5	1–2–2	2–2–1	13–17–10
N.Y. Rangers	2–1–2	5–0	1–3–1	2–1–2	4–0–1	2–1–2	4–1	3–1–1	23–8–9
Toronto	4–0–1	4–0–1	1–3–1	2–1–2	3–1–1	0–4–1	3–1–1	2–2–1	19–12–9
Vancouver	2–3	4–1	0–4–1	2–3	0–4–1	1–3–1	1–4	1–3–1	11–25–4

== Schedule and results ==
1973–74 regular season
October: 3–4–2 (home: 2–2–1; road: 1–2–1)

Game	October	Opponent	Score	Record
1	10	Detroit Red Wings	4–1	1–0–0
2	13	@ Pittsburgh Penguins	8–2	2–0–0
3	14	Los Angeles Kings	1–1	2–0–1
4	17	St. Louis Blues	4–0	3–0–1
5	20	@ Toronto Maple Leafs	3–2	3–1–1
6	21	Montreal Canadiens	3–2	3–2–1
7	27	@ New York Islanders	3–2	3–3–1
8	28	Pittsburgh Penguins	7–2	3–4–1
9	30	@ Vancouver Canucks	3–3	3–4–2

November: 7–3–4 (home: 5–0–2; road: 2–3–2)

Game	November	Opponent	Score	Record
10	1	@ Los Angeles Kings	2–1	3–5–2
11	4	@ Chicago Black Hawks	4–1	3–6–2
12	7	Boston Bruins	7–3	4–6–2
13	9	@ Atlanta Flames	3–3	4–6–3
14	11	New York Islanders	5–2	5–6–3
15	14	Chicago Black Hawks	4–4	5–6–4
16	15	@ Boston Bruins	10–2	5–7–4
17	17	@ Minnesota North Stars	6–3	6–7–4
18	18	Pittsburgh Penguins	7–0	7–7–4
19	21	California Golden Seals	3–0	8–7–4
20	22	@ Buffalo Sabres	7–6	9–7–4
21	24	Los Angeles Kings	5–5	9–7–5
22	25	Vancouver Canucks	5–0	10–7–5
23	29	@ Philadelphia Flyers	2–2	10–7–6

December: 7–4–3 (home: 6–1–1; road: 1–3–2)

Game	December	Opponent	Score	Record
24	1	@ St. Louis Blues	4–4	10–7–7
25	2	Toronto Maple Leafs	6–4	11–7–7
26	5	St. Louis Blues	5–1	12–7–7
27	6	@ Buffalo Sabres	8–4	12–8–7
28	9	California Golden Seals	6–3	13–8–7
29	12	Buffalo Sabres	1–1	13–8–8
30	15	@ Toronto Maple Leafs	2–2	13–8–9
31	16	Chicago Black Hawks	6–1	13–9–9
32	20	Detroit Red Wings	5–2	14–9–9
33	22	@ Pittsburgh Penguins	4–1	15–9–9
34	23	@ Atlanta Flames	3–1	15–10–9
35	26	Philadelphia Flyers	2–1	16–10–9
36	29	@ Montreal Canadiens	7–1	16–11–9
37	30	Minnesota North Stars	4–3	17–11–9

January: 7–4–1 (home: 3–1–0; road: 4–3–1)

Game	January	Opponent	Score	Record
38	3	@ Philadelphia Flyers	4–2	17–12–9
39	4	Boston Bruins	4–2	17–13–9
40	6	Atlanta Flames	5–2	18–13–9
41	10	@ Buffalo Sabres	7–2	18–14–9
42	12	@ Vancouver Canucks	6–1	19–14–9
43	13	@ California Golden Seals	7–2	20–14–9
44	16	@ Detroit Red Wings	4–4	20–14–10
45	17	@ St. Louis Blues	3–2	20–15–10
46	19	@ Chicago Black Hawks	3–2	21–15–10
47	23	Atlanta Flames	4–1	22–15–10
48	27	Los Angeles Kings	5–3	23–15–10
49	30	@ Pittsburgh Penguins	4–2	24–15–10

February: 8–1–2 (home: 4–0–1; road: 4–1–1)

Game	February	Opponent	Score	Record
50	2	@ Minnesota North Stars	3–1	25–15–10
51	3	Minnesota North Stars	5–5	25–15–11
52	6	New York Islanders	6–0	26–15–11
53	9	@ Montreal Canadiens	7–2	26–16–11
54	10	St. Louis Blues	4–2	27–16–11
55	14	@ Philadelphia Flyers	4–4	27–16–12
56	16	@ Vancouver Canucks	9–4	28–16–12
57	21	@ Los Angeles Kings	5–3	29–16–12
58	22	@ California Golden Seals	4–3	30–16–12
59	24	Philadelphia Flyers	3–2	31–16–12
60	27	Vancouver Canucks	4–2	32–16–12

March: 6–7–2 (home: 4–3–1; road: 2–4–1)

Game	March	Opponent	Score	Record
61	2	@ Minnesota North Stars	3–1	33–16–12
62	3	California Golden Seals	8–2	34–16–12
63	6	Montreal Canadiens	9–2	35–16–12
64	9	@ Montreal Canadiens	4–2	35–17–12
65	10	New York Islanders	4–2	36–17–12
66	14	Chicago Black Hawks	5–2	36–18–12
67	16	@ New York Islanders	3–1	37–18–12
68	17	@ Boston Bruins	5–2	37–19–12
69	20	Vancouver Canucks	7–5	37–20–12
70	21	@ Atlanta Flames	5–5	37–20–13
71	23	@ Detroit Red Wings	5–3	37–21–13
72	24	Buffalo Sabres	5–3	38–21–13
73	27	Boston Bruins	3–2	38–22–13
74	30	@ Toronto Maple Leafs	7–3	38–23–13
75	31	Toronto Maple Leafs	3–3	38–23–14

April: 2–1–0 (home: 2–0–0; road: 0–1–0)

Game	April	Opponent	Score	Record
76	3	Detroit Red Wings	5–3	39–23–14
77	6	@ Detroit Red Wings	8–3	39–24–14
78	7	Montreal Canadiens	6–4	40–24–14

Legend: Win (2 points) Loss (0 points) Tie (1 point)

== Playoffs ==
1974 Stanley Cup playoffs
Quarterfinals vs. (E2) Montreal Canadiens – Rangers win 4–2

Game	Date	Visitor	Score	Home	OT	Series
1	April 10	New York Rangers	4–1	Montreal Canadiens		New York Rangers lead series 1–0
2	April 11	New York Rangers	1–4	Montreal Canadiens		Series tied 1–1
3	April 13	Montreal Canadiens	4–2	New York Rangers		Montreal leads series 2–1
4	April 14	Montreal Canadiens	4–6	New York Rangers		Series tied 2–2
5	April 16	New York Rangers	3–2	Montreal Canadiens	OT	New York Rangers lead series 3–2
6	April 18	Montreal Canadiens	2–5	New York Rangers		New York Rangers win series 4–2

Semifinals vs. (W1) Philadelphia Flyers – Flyers win 4–2

Game	Date	Visitor	Score	Home	OT	Series
1	April 20	New York Rangers	0–4	Philadelphia Flyers		Philadelphia leads series 1–0
2	April 23	New York Rangers	2–5	Philadelphia Flyers		Philadelphia leads series 2–0
3	April 25	Philadelphia Flyers	3–5	New York Rangers		Philadelphia leads series 2–1
4	April 28	Philadelphia Flyers	1–2	New York Rangers	OT	Series tied 2–2
5	April 30	New York Rangers	1–4	Philadelphia Flyers		Philadelphia leads series 3–2
6	May 2	Philadelphia Flyers	1–4	New York Rangers		Series tied 3–3
7	May 5	New York Rangers	3–4	Philadelphia Flyers		Philadelphia wins series 4–3

Legend: Win Loss

== Player statistics ==
Skaters

Regular season
Player	GP	G	A	Pts	PIM
Brad Park	78	25	57	82	148
Rod Gilbert	75	36	41	77	20
Pete Stemkowski	78	25	45	70	74
Jean Ratelle	68	28	39	67	16
Walt Tkaczuk	71	21	42	63	58
Bill Fairbairn	78	18	44	62	12
Steve Vickers	75	34	24	58	18
Vic Hadfield	77	27	28	55	75
Bobby Rousseau	72	10	41	51	4
Ted Irvine	75	26	20	46	105
Bruce MacGregor	66	17	27	44	6
Rod Seiling	68	7	23	30	32
Gilles Marotte^{†}	46	2	17	19	28
Jerry Butler	26	6	10	16	24
Dale Rolfe	48	3	12	15	56
Ron Harris	63	2	12	14	25
Jim Neilson	72	4	7	11	38
Larry Sacharuk	23	2	4	6	4
Gene Carr^{‡}	29	1	5	6	15
Sheldon Kannegiesser^{‡}	12	1	3	4	6
Jack Egers^{†}	28	1	3	4	6
Mike Murphy^{‡}	16	2	1	3	0
Tom Williams^{‡}	14	1	2	3	4
Bert Wilson	5	1	1	2	2
Glen Sather^{‡}	2	0	0	0	0
Real Lemieux^{†‡}	7	0	0	0	0

Playoffs
Player	GP	G	A	Pts	PIM
Pete Stemkowski	13	6	6	12	35
Brad Park	13	4	8	12	38
Dale Rolfe	13	1	8	9	23
Bobby Rousseau	12	1	8	9	4
Bruce MacGregor	13	6	2	8	2
Ted Irvine	13	3	5	8	16
Steve Vickers	13	4	4	8	17
Bill Fairbairn	13	3	5	8	6
Rod Gilbert	13	3	5	8	4
Jean Ratelle	13	2	4	6	0
Walt Tkaczuk	13	0	5	5	22
Ron Harris	11	3	0	3	14
Jerry Butler	12	0	2	2	25
Rod Seiling	13	0	2	2	19
Jack Egers	8	1	0	1	4
Jim Neilson	12	0	1	1	4
Gilles Marotte	12	0	1	1	6
Vic Hadfield	6	1	0	1	0

Goaltenders

Regular season
Player	GP	TOI	W	L	T	GA	GAA	SO
Ed Giacomin	56	3286	30	15	10	168	3.07	5
Gilles Villemure	21	1054	7	7	3	62	3.53	0
Peter McDuffe	6	340	3	2	1	18	3.18	0

Playoffs
Player	GP	TOI	W	L	GA	GAA	SO
Ed Giacomin	13	788	7	6	37	2.82	0
Gilles Villemure	1	1	0	0	0	0.00	0

^{†}Denotes player spent time with another team before joining Rangers. Stats reflect time with Rangers only.
^{‡}Traded mid-season. Stats reflect time with Rangers only.

Note:

Pos = Position;GP = Games played; G = Goals; A = Assists; Pts = Points; PIM = Penalty minutes; +/- = Plus/minus; PPG = Power-play goals; SHG = Short-handed goals; GWG = Game-winning goals
Pos = Position;GP = Games played; Min, TOI = Minutes played; W = Wins; L = Losses; T,T/OT = Ties; OTL = Overtime losses; GA = Goals-against; GAA = Goals-against average; SO = Shutouts; SA = Shots against; SV = Shots saved;SV% = Save percentage;

== Draft picks ==
New York's picks at the 1973 NHL amateur draft in Montreal, Canada.

Round	#	Player	Position	Nationality	College/Junior/Club team (League)
1	14	Rick Middleton	RW	Canada	Oshawa Generals (OHA)
2	30	Pat Hickey	LW	Canada	Hamilton Red Wings (OHA)
3	46	John Campbell	LW	Canada	Sault Ste. Marie Greyhounds (OHA)
4	62	Brian Molvik	D	Canada	Calgary Centennials (WCHL)
5	78	Pierre Laganiere	RW	Canada	Sherbrooke Beavers (QMJHL)
6	94	Dwayne Pentland	D	Canada	Brandon Wheat Kings (WCHL)
