= Gary Holt (ice hockey) =

Canadian ice hockey player

- Born: January 1, 1952 (age 74) Sarnia, Ontario, Canada
- Height: 5 ft 9 in (175 cm)
- Weight: 175 lb (79 kg; 12 st 7 lb)
- Position: Left wing
- Shot: Left
- Played for: California Golden Seals; Cleveland Barons; St. Louis Blues
- NHL draft: Undrafted
- Playing career: 1972–1979

Gary Ray Holt (born January 1, 1952) is a Canadian retired professional ice hockey forward who played 101 games in the National Hockey League for the St. Louis Blues, Cleveland Barons and California Golden Seals. Holt now resides in Spokane, Washington.

Born in Sarnia, Ontario, Holt is the older brother of former NHL defenseman Randy Holt.

== Career statistics ==
=== Regular season and playoffs ===
| | | | Regular season | | | | | Playoffs |
| Season | Team | League | GP | G | A | Pts | PIM | GP | G | A | Pts | PIM |
|---|---|---|---|---|---|---|---|---|---|---|---|---|
| 1969–70 | Sudbury Cub-Wolves | NOJHL | 46 | 37 | 40 | 77 | 106 | 12 | 8 | 10 | 18 | 8 |
| 1970–71 | Niagara Falls Flyers | OHA | 35 | 10 | 14 | 24 | 48 | — | — | — | — | — |
| 1971–72 | Niagara Falls Flyers | OHA | 64 | 11 | 12 | 23 | 27 | 6 | 1 | 3 | 4 | 4 |
| 1972–73 | Port Huron Wings | IHL | 75 | 30 | 30 | 60 | 82 | 11 | 1 | 6 | 7 | 6 |
| 1973–74 | California Golden Seals | NHL | 1 | 0 | 0 | 0 | 0 | — | — | — | — | — |
| 1973–74 | Salt Lake Golden Eagles | WHL | 71 | 21 | 26 | 47 | 197 | 5 | 0 | 0 | 0 | 11 |
| 1974–75 | California Golden Seals | NHL | 1 | 0 | 1 | 1 | 0 | — | — | — | — | — |
| 1974–75 | Salt Lake Golden Eagles | CHL | 78 | 26 | 39 | 65 | 200 | 11 | 6 | 4 | 10 | 57 |
| 1975–76 | California Golden Seals | NHL | 48 | 6 | 5 | 11 | 50 | — | — | — | — | — |
| 1975–76 | Salt Lake Golden Eagles | CHL | 21 | 9 | 6 | 15 | 30 | 4 | 1 | 1 | 2 | 45 |
| 1976–77 | Cleveland Barons | NHL | 2 | 0 | 1 | 1 | 2 | — | — | — | — | — |
| 1976–77 | Salt Lake Golden Eagles | CHL | 68 | 17 | 21 | 38 | 226 | — | — | — | — | — |
| 1977–78 | St. Louis Blues | NHL | 49 | 7 | 4 | 11 | 81 | — | — | — | — | — |
| 1977–78 | Salt Lake Golden Eagles | CHL | 24 | 8 | 7 | 15 | 89 | — | — | — | — | — |
| 1978–79 | Salt Lake Golden Eagles | CHL | 72 | 14 | 17 | 31 | 143 | 8 | 2 | 1 | 3 | 12 |
| NHL totals | | | 101 | 13 | 11 | 24 | 133 | — | — | — | — | — |
