= 1973–74 Chicago Black Hawks season =

National Hockey League team season

1973–74 Chicago Black Hawks
- Division: 2nd West
- 1973–74 record: 41–14–23
- Home record: 20–6–13
- Road record: 21–8–10
- Goals for: 272
- Goals against: 164

Team information
- General manager: Tommy Ivan
- Coach: Billy Reay
- Captain: Vacant
- Alternate captains: Doug Jarrett; Stan Mikita; Bill White
- Arena: Chicago Stadium

Team leaders
- Goals: Jim Pappin (32)
- Assists: Stan Mikita (50)
- Points: Stan Mikita (80)
- Penalty minutes: Phil Russell (184)
- Plus/minus: Bill White (+51)
- Wins: Tony Esposito (34)
- Goals against average: Tony Esposito (2.04)

The 1973–74 Chicago Black Hawks season was the Hawks' 48th season in the NHL, and the club was coming off their fourth consecutive first-place finish in 1972–73, as they finished on top of the West Division with a 42–27–9 record, earning 93 points. The Black Hawks defeated the Los Angeles Kings in the NHL quarter-finals, but lost to the Boston Bruins in the semi-finals.

Chicago started the season slowly, as they had a 2–4–4 record in their first ten games; however, the club then went on a nine-game unbeaten streak to push themselves over the .500 mark. The Hawks battled with the Philadelphia Flyers all season long for the top spot in the West Division, as Chicago finished with a record of 41–14–23, earning 105 points, which was their third-highest total in club history. It was not enough though, as the Flyers dethroned the Black Hawks for top spot in the West, as they finished with 112 points thus ending Chicago's streak of four consecutive division titles. The 14 losses by Chicago was the fewest by the team in one season, while the 23 ties they recorded was a new team record.

Offensively, the Black Hawks were led by Stan Mikita, who had a club-high 50 assists and 80 points, while Jim Pappin led the team in goals for the second consecutive season, as he scored 32 goals, and finished with 73 points. Pit Martin scored 30 goals and 77 points, while Dennis Hull had 29 goals and 68 points. On defense, Dick Redmond emerged as the offensive leader, scoring 17 goals and 59 points, while Bill White recorded 36 points, while having a team-high +51 rating. Phil Russell had 10 goals and 35 points, while having a team-high 184 penalty minutes.

In goal, Tony Esposito led the club with 34 victories and a 2.04 GAA, along with ten shutouts while appearing in 70 games. Rookie goaltender Mike Veisor backed up Esposito, going 7–0–2 with a 2.23 GAA in 10 games. Chicago tied the Philadelphia Flyers with the fewest goals against in the league at 164, as Tony Esposito and the Flyers Bernie Parent shared the Vezina Trophy for their achievements.

The Hawks opened the playoffs against the Los Angeles Kings, who had a record of 33–33–12, earning 78 points, while placing third in the West Division. The series opened with two games at Chicago Stadium, and the Black Hawks used their home ice to their advantage, defeating the Kings 3–1 and 4–1 to take a 2–0 series lead. The series shifted to The Forum in Los Angeles for the next two games, and the Hawks continued to shut down the Kings in the third game, shutting them out 1–0. Los Angeles avoided the sweep by easily handling the Black Hawks 5–1 to send the series back to Chicago. In the fifth game, the Hawks, led by Tony Esposito, shut out Los Angeles by a score of 1–0 to eliminate the Kings from the playoffs.

Chicago's next opponent was the Boston Bruins, who had finished the season with a 52–17–9 record, earning 113 points, and a first-place finish in the East Division. The Bruins swept the Toronto Maple Leafs in the first round. The series opened up with two games at the Boston Garden, but it was Chicago who struck first, doubling the Bruins 4–2 in the series opener. Boston responded in the second game, winning 8–6 to even the series. The next two games were played in Chicago, and the Black Hawks re-took the series lead, defeating Boston 4–3 in overtime; however, the Bruins rebounded, winning the fourth game 5–2 to even the series again. The fifth game was back in Boston, and the Bruins took their first series lead, dominating Chicago by a score of 6–2. Boston clinched the series in the sixth game, winning 4–2 on Chicago ice to eliminate the Black Hawks from the post-season.

== Season standings ==
West Division
		GP	W	L	T	GF	GA	DIFF	Pts
1	Philadelphia Flyers	78	50	16	12	273	164	+109	112
2	Chicago Black Hawks	78	41	14	23	272	164	+108	105
3	Los Angeles Kings	78	33	33	12	233	231	+2	78
4	Atlanta Flames	78	30	34	14	214	238	−24	74
5	Pittsburgh Penguins	78	28	41	9	242	273	−31	65
6	St. Louis Blues	78	26	40	12	206	248	−42	64
7	Minnesota North Stars	78	23	38	17	235	275	−40	63
8	California Golden Seals	78	13	55	10	195	342	−147	36

=== Record vs. opponents ===
==== Vs. West Division ====
1973–74 NHL records
Team	ATL	CAL	CHI	LAK	MIN	PHI	PIT	STL	Total
Atlanta	—	4–0–1	1–2–2	1–5	3–2	2–2–2	1–3–2	1–3–1	13–17–8
California	0–4–1	—	1–3–2	1–4	1–3–2	0–5	1–4	2–3–1	6–26–6
Chicago	2–1–2	3–1–2	—	3–1–2	3–1–1	2–2–1	5–1	3–0–2	21–7–10
Los Angeles	5–1	4–1	1–3–2	—	2–3–1	2–2–1	4–1	3–2	21–13–4
Minnesota	2–3	3–1–2	1–3–1	3–2–1	—	0–4–2	2–2–1	3–1–1	14–16–8
Philadelphia	2–2–2	5–0	2–2–1	2–2–1	4–0–2	—	3–2	6–0	24–8–6
Pittsburgh	3–1–2	4–1	1–5	1–4	2–2–1	2–3	—	2–3–1	15–19–4
St. Louis	3–1–1	3–2–1	0–3–2	2–3	1–3–1	0–6	3–2–1	—	12–20–6

==== Vs. East Division ====
1973–74 NHL records
Team	BOS	BUF	DET	MTL	NYI	NYR	TOR	VAN	Total
Atlanta	3–2	3–1–1	3–1–1	3–2	1–3–1	1–2–2	0–4–1	3–2	17–17–6
California	1–4	2–3	1–4	1–3–1	1–2–2	0–5	0–4–1	1–4	7–29–4
Chicago	2–0–3	0–2–3	4–0–1	2–2–1	2–1–2	3–1–1	3–1–1	4–0–1	20–7–13
Los Angeles	1–3–1	1–4	1–3–1	1–3–1	3–1–1	1–2–2	1–2–2	3–2	12–20–8
Minnesota	0–3–2	1–3–1	1–2–2	1–4	1–3–1	0–4–1	1–3–1	4–0–1	9–22–9
Philadelphia	1–3–1	5–0	5–0	2–2–1	5–0	1–2–2	4–0–1	3–1–1	26–8–6
Pittsburgh	0–5	3–2	2–2–1	0–4–1	2–1–2	1–4	1–3–1	4–1	13–22–5
St. Louis	1–4	2–2–1	1–3–1	2–3	2–2–1	1–3–1	2–2–1	3–1–1	14–20–6

== Schedule and results ==
=== Regular season ===
1973–74 regular season
October

Game	Date	Visitor	Score	Home	Record	Points
1	October 10	Chicago Black Hawks	3–0	Los Angeles Kings	1–0–0	2
2	October 12	Chicago Black Hawks	2–3	California Golden Seals	1–1–0	2
3	October 14	Minnesota North Stars	1–1	Chicago Black Hawks	1–1–1	3
4	October 17	Vancouver Canucks	0–5	Chicago Black Hawks	2–1–1	5
5	October 21	New York Islanders	3–3	Chicago Black Hawks	2–1–2	6
6	October 24	Chicago Black Hawks	1–3	Buffalo Sabres	2–2–2	6
7	October 27	Chicago Black Hawks	4–4	St. Louis Blues	2–2–3	7
8	October 28	Toronto Maple Leafs	1–1	Chicago Black Hawks	2–2–4	8

November

Game	Date	Visitor	Score	Home	Record	Points
9	November 1	Chicago Black Hawks	0–1	Philadelphia Flyers	2–3–4	8
10	November 3	Chicago Black Hawks	4–5	Minnesota North Stars	2–4–4	8
11	November 4	New York Rangers	1–4	Chicago Black Hawks	3–4–4	10
12	November 7	Chicago Black Hawks	1–1	California Golden Seals	3–4–5	11
13	November 9	Chicago Black Hawks	4–0	Vancouver Canucks	4–4–5	13
14	November 11	Chicago Black Hawks	3–0	Los Angeles Kings	5–4–5	15
15	November 14	Chicago Black Hawks	4–4	New York Rangers	5–4–6	16
16	November 16	Chicago Black Hawks	6–1	Atlanta Flames	6–4–6	18
17	November 17	Chicago Black Hawks	4–1	Pittsburgh Penguins	7–4–6	20
18	November 21	St. Louis Blues	1–4	Chicago Black Hawks	8–4–6	22
19	November 24	Chicago Black Hawks	3–1	Toronto Maple Leafs	9–4–6	24
20	November 25	Montreal Canadiens	6–4	Chicago Black Hawks	9–5–6	24
21	November 28	Boston Bruins	3–3	Chicago Black Hawks	9–5–7	25

December

Game	Date	Visitor	Score	Home	Record	Points
22	December 1	Chicago Black Hawks	5–0	Montreal Canadiens	10–5–7	27
23	December 2	Pittsburgh Penguins	1–2	Chicago Black Hawks	11–5–7	29
24	December 5	Chicago Black Hawks	8–2	Detroit Red Wings	12–5–7	31
25	December 9	Minnesota North Stars	3–5	Chicago Black Hawks	13–5–7	33
26	December 12	Philadelphia Flyers	2–2	Chicago Black Hawks	13–5–8	34
27	December 15	Chicago Black Hawks	3–3	New York Islanders	13–5–9	35
28	December 16	Chicago Black Hawks	6–1	New York Rangers	14–5–9	37
29	December 19	Buffalo Sabres	2–2	Chicago Black Hawks	14–5–10	38
30	December 22	Chicago Black Hawks	2–4	Philadelphia Flyers	14–6–10	38
31	December 23	Vancouver Canucks	2–6	Chicago Black Hawks	15–6–10	40
32	December 26	Los Angeles Kings	3–3	Chicago Black Hawks	15–6–11	41
33	December 29	Chicago Black Hawks	4–2	Pittsburgh Penguins	16–6–11	43
34	December 30	Toronto Maple Leafs	4–3	Chicago Black Hawks	16–7–11	43

January

Game	Date	Visitor	Score	Home	Record	Points
35	January 2	New York Islanders	1–5	Chicago Black Hawks	17–7–11	45
36	January 3	Chicago Black Hawks	2–3	Atlanta Flames	17–8–11	45
37	January 6	California Golden Seals	4–9	Chicago Black Hawks	18–8–11	47
38	January 9	Los Angeles Kings	4–4	Chicago Black Hawks	18–8–12	48
39	January 10	Chicago Black Hawks	2–2	Boston Bruins	18–8–13	49
40	January 13	Detroit Red Wings	1–4	Chicago Black Hawks	19–8–13	51
41	January 16	Boston Bruins	5–5	Chicago Black Hawks	19–8–14	52
42	January 19	New York Rangers	3–2	Chicago Black Hawks	19–9–14	52
43	January 20	Vancouver Canucks	2–7	Chicago Black Hawks	20–9–14	54
44	January 24	Chicago Black Hawks	2–1	Boston Bruins	21–9–14	56
45	January 26	Chicago Black Hawks	1–4	Montreal Canadiens	21–10–14	56
46	January 27	New York Islanders	4–2	Chicago Black Hawks	21–11–14	56
47	January 31	California Golden Seals	1–2	Chicago Black Hawks	22–11–14	58

February

Game	Date	Visitor	Score	Home	Record	Points
48	February 2	Chicago Black Hawks	3–1	Pittsburgh Penguins	23–11–14	60
49	February 3	St. Louis Blues	0–3	Chicago Black Hawks	24–11–14	62
50	February 6	Atlanta Flames	1–1	Chicago Black Hawks	24–11–15	63
51	February 8	Chicago Black Hawks	3–0	Atlanta Flames	25–11–15	65
52	February 10	Pittsburgh Penguins	3–5	Chicago Black Hawks	26–11–15	67
53	February 13	Los Angeles Kings	0–4	Chicago Black Hawks	27–11–15	69
54	February 16	Chicago Black Hawks	4–0	New York Islanders	28–11–15	71
55	February 17	Toronto Maple Leafs	1–4	Chicago Black Hawks	29–11–15	73
56	February 20	California Golden Seals	0–3	Chicago Black Hawks	30–11–15	75
57	February 23	Philadelphia Flyers	1–3	Chicago Black Hawks	31–11–15	77
58	February 24	Pittsburgh Penguins	4–2	Chicago Black Hawks	31–12–15	77
59	February 27	Chicago Black Hawks	3–1	Minnesota North Stars	32–12–15	79
60	February 28	Chicago Black Hawks	2–2	Buffalo Sabres	32–12–16	80

March

Game	Date	Visitor	Score	Home	Record	Points
61	March 3	Chicago Black Hawks	6–6	Detroit Red Wings	32–12–17	81
62	March 6	Chicago Black Hawks	3–3	California Golden Seals	32–12–18	82
63	March 7	Chicago Black Hawks	2–3	Los Angeles Kings	32–13–18	82
64	March 9	Chicago Black Hawks	4–4	Vancouver Canucks	32–13–19	83
65	March 13	Montreal Canadiens	3–3	Chicago Black Hawks	32–13–20	84
66	March 14	Chicago Black Hawks	5–2	New York Rangers	33–13–20	86
67	March 16	Chicago Black Hawks	3–1	Montreal Canadiens	34–13–20	88
68	March 17	Atlanta Flames	3–3	Chicago Black Hawks	34–13–21	89
69	March 20	Buffalo Sabres	3–2	Chicago Black Hawks	34–14–21	89
70	March 23	Chicago Black Hawks	3–1	Philadelphia Flyers	35–14–21	91
71	March 24	Minnesota North Stars	0–6	Chicago Black Hawks	36–14–21	93
72	March 27	Chicago Black Hawks	5–3	Toronto Maple Leafs	37–14–21	95
73	March 28	Chicago Black Hawks	2–2	Buffalo Sabres	37–14–22	96
74	March 30	Chicago Black Hawks	2–1	Detroit Red Wings	38–14–22	98
75	March 31	St. Louis Blues	2–2	Chicago Black Hawks	38–14–23	99

April

Game	Date	Visitor	Score	Home	Record	Points
76	April 3	Boston Bruins	2–6	Chicago Black Hawks	39–14–23	101
77	April 6	Chicago Black Hawks	6–3	St. Louis Blues	40–14–23	103
78	April 7	Detroit Red Wings	4–7	Chicago Black Hawks	41–14–23	105

Legend: Win (2 points) Loss (0 points) Tie (1 point)

=== Playoffs ===
1974 Stanley Cup playoffs
Quarterfinals vs. (W3) Los Angeles Kings – Black Hawks win 4–1

Game	Date	Visitor	Score	Home	Series
1	April 10	Los Angeles Kings	1–3	Chicago Black Hawks	1–0
2	April 11	Los Angeles Kings	1–4	Chicago Black Hawks	2–0
3	April 13	Chicago Black Hawks	1–0	Los Angeles Kings	3–0
4	April 14	Chicago Black Hawks	1–5	Los Angeles Kings	3–1
5	April 16	Los Angeles Kings	0–1	Chicago Black Hawks	4–1

Semifinals vs. (E1) Boston Bruins – Bruins win 4–2

Game	Date	Visitor	Score	Home	Series
1	April 18	Chicago Black Hawks	4–2	Boston Bruins	1–0
2	April 21	Chicago Black Hawks	6–8	Boston Bruins	1–1
3	April 23	Boston Bruins	3–4	Chicago Black Hawks	2–1
4	April 25	Boston Bruins	5–2	Chicago Black Hawks	2–2
5	April 28	Chicago Black Hawks	2–6	Boston Bruins	2–3
6	April 30	Boston Bruins	4–2	Chicago Black Hawks	2–4

Legend: Win Loss

== Season stats ==
=== Scoring leaders ===
Player	GP	G	A	Pts	PIM
Stan Mikita	76	30	50	80	46
Pit Martin	78	30	47	77	43
Jim Pappin	78	32	41	73	76
Dennis Hull	74	29	39	68	15
Dick Redmond	76	17	42	59	69

=== Goaltending ===
Player	GP	TOI	W	L	T	GA	SO	GAA
Tony Esposito	70	4143	34	14	21	141	10	2.04
Mike Veisor	10	537	7	0	2	20	1	2.23

== Playoff stats ==
=== Scoring leaders ===
Player	GP	G	A	Pts	PIM
Stan Mikita	11	5	6	11	8
Dennis Hull	10	6	3	9	0
Jim Pappin	11	3	6	9	29
Bill White	11	1	7	8	14
Dick Redmond	11	1	7	8	8

=== Goaltending ===
Player	GP	TOI	W	L	GA	SO	GAA
Tony Esposito	10	584	6	4	28	2	2.88
Mike Veisor	2	65	0	1	5	0	3.75

== Draft picks ==
Chicago's draft picks at the 1973 NHL amateur draft held at the Mount Royal Hotel in Montreal.

Round	#	Player	Nationality	College/Junior/Club team (League)
1	13	Darcy Rota	Canada	Edmonton Oil Kings (WCHL)
2	29	Reg Thomas	Canada	London Knights (OHA)
3	45	Randy Holt	Canada	Sudbury Wolves (OHA)
4	61	Dave Elliot	Canada	Winnipeg Jets (WCHL)
5	77	Dan Hinton	Canada	Sault Ste. Marie Greyhounds (OHA)
6	93	Gary Doerksen	Canada	Winnipeg Jets (WCHL)
7	109	Wayne Dye	Canada	New Westminster Bruins (WCHL)
8	125	Jim Koleff	Canada	Hamilton Red Wings (OHA)
9	140	Jack Johnson	United States	University of Wisconsin (NCAA)
9	141	Steve Alley	United States	University of Wisconsin (NCAA)
10	156	Rick Clubbe	Canada	University of North Dakota (NCAA)
11	165	Gene Strate	Canada	Edmonton Oil Kings (WCHL)

== Sources ==
- Hockey-Reference
- Rauzulu's Street
- Goalies Archive
- HockeyDB
- National Hockey League Guide & Record Book 2007
