= East Division (NHL) =

Division of North American hockey league

- Formerly: Original Six (1967); Atlantic Division, Metropolitan Division (2020)
- League: National Hockey League
- Sport: Ice hockey
- Founded: 1967 (original); 2020 (second)
- Folded: 1974 (original); 2021 (second)
- Replaced by: Prince of Wales Conference (1974); Atlantic Division, Metropolitan Division (2021)
- Last champion: Pittsburgh Penguins (1st title) (2021)
- Most titles: Boston Bruins and Montreal Canadiens (3)

The East Division of the National Hockey League existed from 1967 until 1974 when the league realigned into two conferences of two divisions each. The division was reformed for the 2020–21 NHL season (and branded as the MassMutual East Division for sponsorship reasons) due to the COVID-19 pandemic.

In 1967, the NHL doubled in size, going from six teams to twelve. The Original Six, as the pre-1967 teams became retroactively known, were grouped into the East Division, while the expansion teams were placed into the West Division. This was done in order to keep teams of similar competitive strength in the same division, regardless of geographic distance, and to ensure playoff revenue for the new franchises. This competitive imbalance would lead to East Division teams winning the Stanley Cup in six of the seven years the league was divided into two divisions. Another consequence was that in 1969–70, the Montreal Canadiens, who had finished the season with 92 points (more than any team in the West Division), missed the playoffs – the only time between 1948–49 and 1993–94 that they did so.

When the NHL expanded again in 1970, the two new teams, the Vancouver Canucks and Buffalo Sabres, were placed into the stronger East Division. In an effort to create more balanced competition, the Chicago Black Hawks were transferred into the West Division. When the NHL expanded again in 1972, each division was given one of the expansion clubs, with the New York Islanders joining the East Division and the Atlanta Flames joining the West Division.

By 1974, another two teams (the Washington Capitals and Kansas City Scouts) entered the NHL, and as a result the league underwent a major overhaul. The East and West Divisions were renamed the Prince of Wales and Clarence Campbell Conferences, respectively, composed of nine teams each. The conferences were further divided into two divisions: the Norris and Adams Divisions for the Wales Conference, and the Patrick and Smythe Divisions for the Campbell Conference. Because the Conferences were not geographically based, the league opted to name the conferences and divisions after notable persons associated with the NHL.

The East and West Divisions were re-formed for the 2020–21 season as the result of COVID-19 travel restrictions which forced the NHL to radically re-structure the league and to temporarily abolish the conferences. All eight East Division teams were members of the Eastern Conference in the 2019–20 season.

== Division lineups ==
=== 1967–1970 ===
1967–1970 East Division Teams
- Boston Bruins
- Chicago Black Hawks
- Detroit Red Wings
- Montreal Canadiens
- New York Rangers
- Toronto Maple Leafs

==== Changes from the 1966–67 season ====
- The East Division is formed as the result of NHL realignment
- All Original Six teams are placed in the division

=== 1970–1972 ===
1970–1972 East Division Teams
- Boston Bruins
- Buffalo Sabres
- Detroit Red Wings
- Montreal Canadiens
- New York Rangers
- Toronto Maple Leafs
- Vancouver Canucks

==== Changes from the 1969–70 season ====
- The Chicago Black Hawks move to the West Division
- The Buffalo Sabres and Vancouver Canucks are added as expansion teams

=== 1972–1974 ===
1972–1974 East Division Teams
- Boston Bruins
- Buffalo Sabres
- Detroit Red Wings
- Montreal Canadiens
- New York Islanders
- New York Rangers
- Toronto Maple Leafs
- Vancouver Canucks

==== Changes from the 1971–72 season ====
- The New York Islanders are added as an expansion team

=== After the 1973–74 season ===
The league was reformatted into two conferences with two divisions each. The Boston Bruins, Buffalo Sabres and Toronto Maple Leafs moved to the Adams Division. The Detroit Red Wings and Montreal Canadiens moved to the Norris Division. The New York Islanders and New York Rangers moved to the Patrick Division, while the Vancouver Canucks moved to the Smythe Division.

=== 2020–21 ===
2020–2021 East Division Teams
- Boston Bruins
- Buffalo Sabres
- New Jersey Devils
- New York Islanders
- New York Rangers
- Philadelphia Flyers
- Pittsburgh Penguins
- Washington Capitals

==== Changes from the 2019–20 season ====
- Due to COVID-19 restrictions the NHL realigned for the 2020–21 season
- The East Division is reformed for the 2020–21 NHL season
- The Boston Bruins and Buffalo Sabres come from the Atlantic Division
- The New Jersey Devils, New York Islanders, New York Rangers, Philadelphia Flyers, Pittsburgh Penguins and Washington Capitals come from the Metropolitan Division

==== Changes from the 2020–21 season ====
- The division is dissolved as the league returned to previous two conference and four division alignment
- The Boston Bruins and Buffalo Sabres move to the Atlantic Division
- The New Jersey Devils, New York Islanders, New York Rangers, Philadelphia Flyers, Pittsburgh Penguins and Washington Capitals move to the Metropolitan Division

== Season results ==
^{(#)}	Denotes team that won the Stanley Cup
^{(#)}	Denotes team that lost Stanley Cup Final
^{(#)}	Denotes team that qualified for the Stanley Cup playoffs
‡	Denotes team with most points in the regular season

Season	1st	2nd	3rd	4th	5th	6th	7th	8th
1967–68	Montreal (94)^{‡}	NY Rangers (90)	Boston (84)	Chicago (80)	Toronto (76)	Detroit (66)		
1968–69	Montreal (103)^{‡}	Boston (100)	NY Rangers (91)	Toronto (85)	Detroit (78)	Chicago (77)		
1969–70	Chicago (99)^{‡}	Boston (99)	Detroit (95)	NY Rangers (92)	Montreal (92)	Toronto (71)		
1970–71	Boston (121)^{‡}	NY Rangers (109)	Montreal (97)	Toronto (82)	Buffalo (63)	Vancouver (56)	Detroit (55)	
1971–72	Boston (119)^{‡}	NY Rangers (109)	Montreal (108)	Toronto (80)	Detroit (76)	Buffalo (51)	Vancouver (48)	
1972–73	Montreal (120)^{‡}	Boston (107)	NY Rangers (102)	Buffalo (88)	Detroit (86)	Toronto (64)	Vancouver (53)	NY Islanders (30)
1973–74	Boston (113)^{‡}	Montreal (99)	NY Rangers (94)	Toronto (86)	Buffalo (76)	Detroit (68)	Vancouver (59)	NY Islanders (56)
Division not used from 1974–2020
2020–21	Pittsburgh (77)	Washington (77)	Boston (73)	NY Islanders (71)	NY Rangers (60)	Philadelphia (58)	New Jersey (45)	Buffalo (37)

== East Division titles won by team ==
Teams in bold were in the division in its most recent season.

Team	Wins	Last win
**Boston Bruins**	3	1974
Montreal Canadiens	3	1973
Chicago Blackhawks	1	1970
**Pittsburgh Penguins**	1	2021
**Buffalo Sabres**	0	—
Detroit Red Wings	0	—
**New Jersey Devils**	0	—
**New York Islanders**	0	—
**New York Rangers**	0	—
**Philadelphia Flyers**	0	—
Toronto Maple Leafs	0	—
Vancouver Canucks	0	—
**Washington Capitals**	0	—
