= 1973–74 Philadelphia Flyers season =

NHL hockey team season (won Stanley Cup)

1973–74 Philadelphia Flyers
- Stanley Cup champions
- West Division champions
- Division: 1st West
- 1973–74 record: 50–16–12
- Home record: 28–6–5
- Road record: 22–10–7
- Goals for: 273 (5th)
- Goals against: 164 (1st)

Team information
- General manager: Keith Allen
- Coach: Fred Shero
- Captain: Bobby Clarke
- Alternate captains: Terry Crisp; Gary Dornhoefer; Joe Watson
- Arena: Spectrum
- Average attendance: 17,007
- Minor league affiliates: Richmond Robins; San Diego Gulls

Team leaders
- Goals: Bobby Clarke (35)
- Assists: Bobby Clarke (52)
- Points: Bobby Clarke (87)
- Penalty minutes: Dave Schultz (348)
- Plus/minus: Barry Ashbee (+52)
- Wins: Bernie Parent (47)
- Goals against average: Bernie Parent (1.89)

The 1973–74 Philadelphia Flyers season was the franchise's seventh season in the National Hockey League (NHL). The Flyers became the first expansion team to win the Stanley Cup. Prior to this season, no post-1967 expansion team had either beaten an Original Six team in a playoff round or won a Stanley Cup Final game.

Goaltender Bernie Parent, an "Original Flyer", returned to the franchise in the off-season, and the Flyers proved that the expansion teams could challenge the Original Six in 1973–74. The Bullies continued their rough-and-tumble ways, led by Dave Schultz's 348 penalty minutes, and reached the top of the West Division with a record of 50–16–12. The return of Parent proved to be of great benefit as he established himself as one of if not the best goaltender in the league by winning 47 games, a record which stood for 33 years. Since the Flyers, along with Chicago, allowed the fewest goals in the league, Parent also shared the Vezina Trophy with Chicago's Tony Esposito.

Come playoff time, the Flyers swept the Atlanta Flames in four games in the first round. In the semifinals, the Flyers faced the New York Rangers. The series, which saw the home team win every game, went seven games. The Flyers had home-ice advantage as they advanced to the 1974 Stanley Cup Final by winning game seven. Their opponent, Bobby Orr and the Boston Bruins, took game one in Boston, but Bobby Clarke scored an overtime goal in game two to even the series. The Flyers won games three and four at home to take a 3–1 series lead, but Boston won game five to stave off elimination. That set the stage for game six at the Spectrum. The Flyers picked up the lead early when Rick MacLeish scored a first-period goal. Late in the game, Orr hauled down Clarke on a breakaway, a penalty which assured the Flyers of victory. Time expired as the Flyers brought the Stanley Cup to Philadelphia for the first time. Parent, having shut out Boston in game six, won the Conn Smythe Trophy as the Playoff MVP.

== Regular season ==
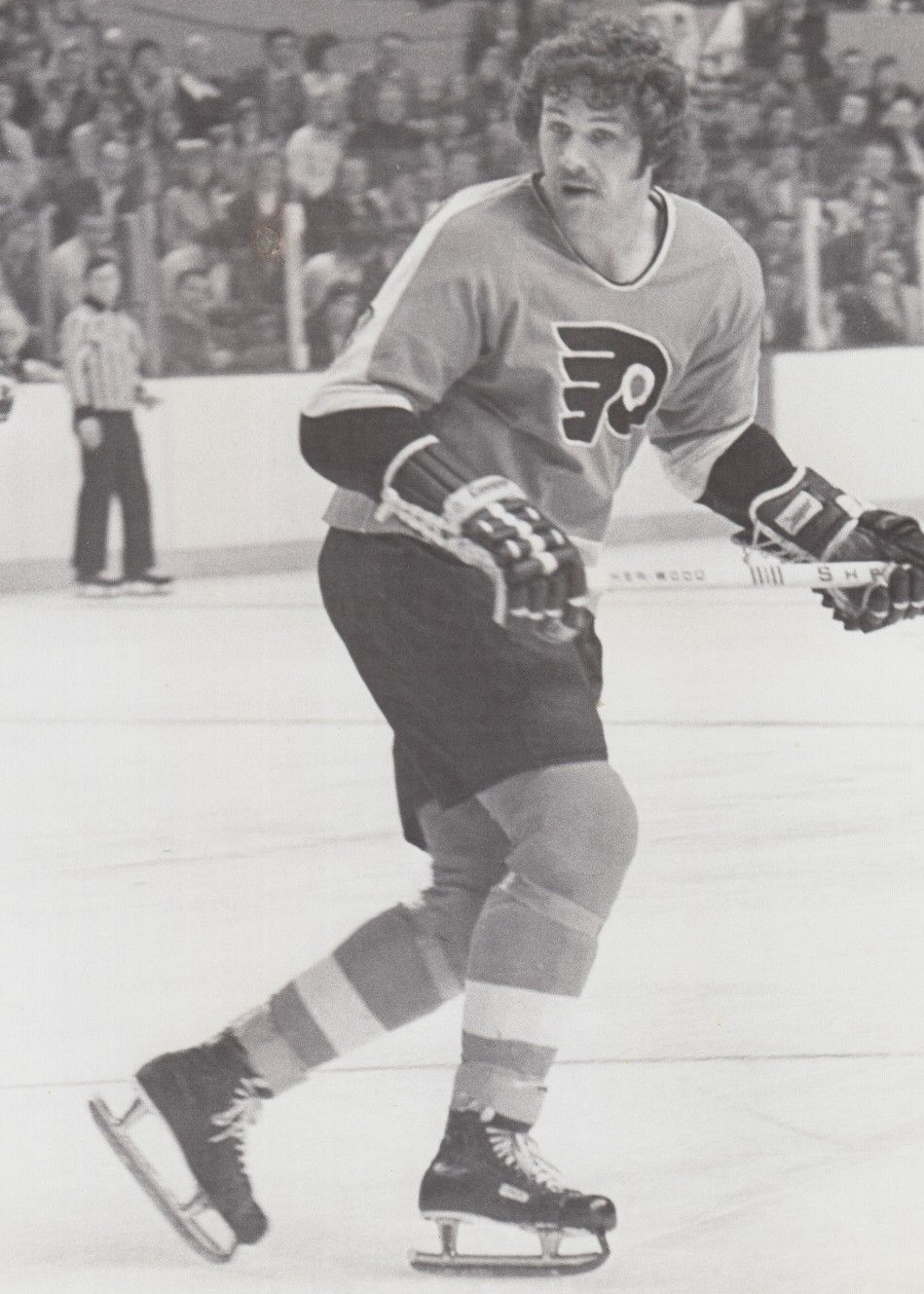
In addition to leading the team in penalty minutes, Dave Schultz was one of five 20 goal scorers on the Flyers.

The 1973–74 season opened on October 11, 1973, against the Toronto Maple Leafs. This was the first time Kate Smith performed "God Bless America" in person at a Flyers' game. The Flyers started strong to begin the season winning their first four games and only allowing their opponents to score three goals total while they netted 18. The Flyers were 29–11–6 heading into the All Star Game, scoring 154 goals, while allowing 93. The Flyers were represented in the All Star Game by Bobby Clarke, Bernie Parent, Ed Van Impe and Joe Watson. The Flyers finished 1st in the Western Division, seven points ahead of the second place Chicago Black Hawks.

The team was led offensively by Bobby Clarke, who led the team in goals with 35, assists with 52 and points with 87. He finished fifth among scoring leader in points. Clarke was named a 2nd Team All Stars along with defenseman Barry Ashbee. Clarke was followed by Bill Barber in goals (34), and by Rick MacLeish both in assists (45) and in points (77).

In net, the Flyers were led by goaltender Bernie Parent, who went 47–13–12, posted a 1.89 goals against average (136 goals against on 2038 shots) and 12 shutouts. Parent's 47 wins was a record until Martin Brodeur won 48 games in the 2006–07 NHL season. It remains the record for most regulation wins by a goaltender in a single season as several of Brodeur's wins came in overtime and the shootout, neither of which existed in the 1970s. Parent was a co-winner of the Vezina Trophy, which was awarded at the time to any goaltenders who played 25 or more games for the team allowing the fewest goals against, with Black Hawks' goaltender Tony Esposito.

=== Season standings ===
West Division
		GP	W	L	T	GF	GA	DIFF	Pts
1	Philadelphia Flyers	78	50	16	12	273	164	+109	112
2	Chicago Black Hawks	78	41	14	23	272	164	+108	105
3	Los Angeles Kings	78	33	33	12	233	231	+2	78
4	Atlanta Flames	78	30	34	14	214	238	−24	74
5	Pittsburgh Penguins	78	28	41	9	242	273	−31	65
6	St. Louis Blues	78	26	40	12	206	248	−42	64
7	Minnesota North Stars	78	23	38	17	235	275	−40	63
8	California Golden Seals	78	13	55	10	195	342	−147	36

=== Record vs. opponents ===
==== Vs. West Division ====
1973–74 NHL records
Team	ATL	CAL	CHI	LAK	MIN	PHI	PIT	STL	Total
Atlanta	—	4–0–1	1–2–2	1–5	3–2	2–2–2	1–3–2	1–3–1	13–17–8
California	0–4–1	—	1–3–2	1–4	1–3–2	0–5	1–4	2–3–1	6–26–6
Chicago	2–1–2	3–1–2	—	3–1–2	3–1–1	2–2–1	5–1	3–0–2	21–7–10
Los Angeles	5–1	4–1	1–3–2	—	2–3–1	2–2–1	4–1	3–2	21–13–4
Minnesota	2–3	3–1–2	1–3–1	3–2–1	—	0–4–2	2–2–1	3–1–1	14–16–8
Philadelphia	2–2–2	5–0	2–2–1	2–2–1	4–0–2	—	3–2	6–0	24–8–6
Pittsburgh	3–1–2	4–1	1–5	1–4	2–2–1	2–3	—	2–3–1	15–19–4
St. Louis	3–1–1	3–2–1	0–3–2	2–3	1–3–1	0–6	3–2–1	—	12–20–6

==== Vs. East Division ====
1973–74 NHL records
Team	BOS	BUF	DET	MTL	NYI	NYR	TOR	VAN	Total
Atlanta	3–2	3–1–1	3–1–1	3–2	1–3–1	1–2–2	0–4–1	3–2	17–17–6
California	1–4	2–3	1–4	1–3–1	1–2–2	0–5	0–4–1	1–4	7–29–4
Chicago	2–0–3	0–2–3	4–0–1	2–2–1	2–1–2	3–1–1	3–1–1	4–0–1	20–7–13
Los Angeles	1–3–1	1–4	1–3–1	1–3–1	3–1–1	1–2–2	1–2–2	3–2	12–20–8
Minnesota	0–3–2	1–3–1	1–2–2	1–4	1–3–1	0–4–1	1–3–1	4–0–1	9–22–9
Philadelphia	1–3–1	5–0	5–0	2–2–1	5–0	1–2–2	4–0–1	3–1–1	26–8–6
Pittsburgh	0–5	3–2	2–2–1	0–4–1	2–1–2	1–4	1–3–1	4–1	13–22–5
St. Louis	1–4	2–2–1	1–3–1	2–3	2–2–1	1–3–1	2–2–1	3–1–1	14–20–6

== Playoffs ==
The Flyers opened the post season against the 4th place Atlanta Flames. The Flyers swept the Atlanta Flames in four games with a combined score of 17–6. Rick MacLeish led the Flyers with four goals during the series. He scored a natural hat-trick in game two.

The Flyers headed into a grueling semifinals match up against the New York Rangers, who had won the regular season series 2–1–2. The series opened up in Philadelphia at the Spectrum with the Flyers shutting out the Rangers 4–0 in game one and taking game two 5–2. The series switched back to New York and the Rangers would take game three 5–3 and game four in overtime 2–1. The Flyers won game five at home 4–1. With the Rangers on the verge of defeat in game six the Rangers won 4–1. In game seven Gary Dornhoefer scored the game-winning goal with 10:59 left in the third. Rick MacLeish again led the Flyers in scoring in this series with seven goals. The home team was the winner of every game in the series.

This set up a Stanley Cup Final matchup against the Boston Bruins, who won the season series 3–1–1. The series opened in Boston at the Boston Garden with Boston winning game one, 3–2 and the Flyers winning game two, 3–2 in overtime on a Bobby Clarke goal. The series moved to Philadelphia where the Flyers won game three, 4–1 and game four, 4–2. The series returned to Boston and Bruins won game five, 5–1. The series returned to Philadelphia for game six. Kate Smith performed "God Bless America" to a sell out crowd of 17,007 prior to the game. The Flyers won their first Stanley Cup on the lone goal of the game by Rick MacLeish in the first period. With seconds left on the Clock Gene Hart, the Flyers play-by-play announcer, made his famous call "Ladies and gentlemen, the Flyers are going to win the Stanley Cup. The Flyers win the Stanley Cup. The Flyers win the Stanley Cup. The Flyers have won the Stanley Cup!". Bernie Parent was awarded the Conn Smythe Trophy as playoff MVP.

== Schedule and results ==
=== Regular season ===
1973–74 regular season
October: 6–3–0 (home: 3–1–0; road: 3–2–0)

Game	Date	Score	Opponent	Decision	Attendance	Record	Points	Recap
1	October 11	2–0	Toronto Maple Leafs	Parent	17,007	1–0–0	2	W
2	October 13	6–0	@ New York Islanders	Parent	13,057	2–0–0	4	W
3	October 14	5–2	Detroit Red Wings	Parent	17,007	3–0–0	6	W
4	October 17	5–1	@ California Golden Seals	Parent	4,679	4–0–0	8	W
5	October 19	1–2	@ Vancouver Canucks	Parent	15,570	4–1–0	8	L
6	October 20	0–3	@ Los Angeles Kings	Parent	11,734	4–2–0	8	L
7	October 25	0–4	Montreal Canadiens	Parent	17,007	4–3–0	8	L
8	October 27	6–0	@ Pittsburgh Penguins	Parent	11,217	5–3–0	10	W
9	October 28	2–1	California Golden Seals	Parent	17,007	6–3–0	12	W

November: 7–3–2 (home: 3–2–1; road: 4–1–1)

Game	Date	Score	Opponent	Decision	Attendance	Record	Points	Recap
10	November 1	1–0	Chicago Black Hawks	Parent	17,007	7–3–0	14	W
11	November 3	1–2	Atlanta Flames	Parent	17,007	7–4–0	14	L
12	November 4	7–0	Pittsburgh Penguins	Parent	17,007	8–4–0	16	W
13	November 7	4–1	@ Detroit Red Wings	Parent	12,509	9–4–0	18	W
14	November 8	2–3	Los Angeles Kings	Parent	17,007	9–5–0	18	L
15	November 11	4–3	St. Louis Blues	Parent	17,007	10–5–0	20	W
16	November 14	5–4	@ Los Angeles Kings	Parent	10,045	11–5–0	22	W
17	November 16	2–1	@ California Golden Seals	Parent	6,511	12–5–0	24	W
18	November 17	2–2	@ Vancouver Canucks	Parent	15,570	12–5–1	25	T
19	November 22	2–4	@ Boston Bruins	Taylor	15,003	12–6–1	25	L
20	November 24	1–0	@ St. Louis Blues	Parent	19,274	13–6–1	27	W
21	November 29	2–2	New York Rangers	Parent	17,007	13–6–2	28	T

December: 8–2–2 (home: 4–1–1; road: 4–1–1)

Game	Date	Score	Opponent	Decision	Attendance	Record	Points	Recap
22	December 1	2–1	@ New York Islanders	Parent	14,865	14–6–2	30	W
23	December 2	5–1	California Golden Seals	Parent	17,007	15–6–2	32	W
24	December 8	3–1	@ Toronto Maple Leafs	Parent	16,485	16–6–2	34	W
25	December 9	3–3	Boston Bruins	Parent	17,007	16–6–3	35	T
26	December 12	2–2	@ Chicago Black Hawks	Parent	11,000	16–6–4	36	T
27	December 15	2–3	Atlanta Flames	Parent	17,007	16–7–4	36	L
28	December 16	4–0	New York Islanders	Parent	17,007	17–7–4	38	W
29	December 20	9–3	Vancouver Canucks	Parent	17,007	18–7–4	40	W
30	December 22	4–2	Chicago Black Hawks	Parent	17,007	19–7–4	42	W
31	December 26	1–2	@ New York Rangers	Parent	17,500	19–8–4	42	L
32	December 29	4–1	@ St. Louis Blues	Parent	10,265	20–8–4	44	W
33	December 30	5–4	@ Buffalo Sabres	Parent	15,858	21–8–4	46	W

January: 9–3–2 (home: 6–1–0; road: 3–2–2)

Game	Date	Score	Opponent	Decision	Attendance	Record	Points	Recap
34	January 3	4–2	New York Rangers	Parent	17,007	22–8–4	48	W
35	January 5	3–3	@ Minnesota North Stars	Parent	15,296	22–8–5	49	T
36	January 7	1–2	@ Montreal Canadiens	Parent	19,040	22–9–5	49	L
37	January 10	7–4	Minnesota North Stars	Parent	17,007	23–9–5	51	W
38	January 11	7–6	@ Atlanta Flames	Taylor	5,141	24–9–5	53	W
39	January 13	1–0	Atlanta Flames	Parent	17,007	25–9–5	55	W
40	January 17	7–2	Buffalo Sabres	Parent	17,007	26–9–5	57	W
41	January 19	2–0	Los Angeles Kings	Parent	17,007	27–9–5	59	W
42	January 20	3–5	Pittsburgh Penguins	Parent	17,007	27–10–5	59	L
43	January 22	3–2	@ Vancouver Canucks	Taylor	15,570	28–10–5	61	W
44	January 24	4–4	@ Los Angeles Kings	Parent	14,343	28–10–6	62	T
45	January 25	5–0	@ California Golden Seals	Parent	10,776	29–10–6	64	W
46	January 27	3–5	@ Boston Bruins	Taylor	15,003	29–11–6	64	L
47	January 31	4–3	Buffalo Sabres	Parent	17,007	30–11–6	66	W

February: 5–3–4 (home: 3–0–2; road: 2–3–2)

Game	Date	Score	Opponent	Decision	Attendance	Record	Points	Recap
48	February 2	12–2	Detroit Red Wings	Parent	17,007	31–11–6	68	W
49	February 3	2–2	@ Atlanta Flames	Parent	14,123	31–11–7	69	T
50	February 7	5–4	Pittsburgh Penguins	Parent	17,007	32–11–7	71	W
51	February 9	3–5	@ Boston Bruins	Parent	15,003	32–12–7	71	L
52	February 10	3–1	Montreal Canadiens	Parent	17,007	33–12–7	73	W
53	February 13	3–1	@ Toronto Maple Leafs	Parent	16,485	34–12–7	75	W
54	February 14	4–4	New York Rangers	Parent	17,007	34–12–8	76	T
55	February 17	2–2	@ Montreal Canadiens	Parent	17,757	34–12–9	77	T
56	February 20	3–1	@ Detroit Red Wings	Parent	15,128	35–12–9	79	W
57	February 23	1–3	@ Chicago Black Hawks	Parent	16,666	35–13–9	79	L
58	February 24	2–3	@ New York Rangers	Parent	17,500	35–14–9	79	L
59	February 28	2–2	Minnesota North Stars	Parent	17,007	35–14–10	80	T

March: 12–1–2 (home: 8–1–1; road: 4–0–1)

Game	Date	Score	Opponent	Decision	Attendance	Record	Points	Recap
60	March 2	4–2	Buffalo Sabres	Parent	17,007	36–14–10	82	W
61	March 3	6–0	Montreal Canadiens	Parent	17,007	37–14–10	84	W
62	March 7	6–1	Detroit Red Wings	Parent	17,007	38–14–10	86	W
63	March 9	2–1	@ Toronto Maple Leafs	Parent	16,485	39–14–10	88	W
64	March 10	4–3	@ Buffalo Sabres	Parent	15,858	40–14–10	90	W
65	March 12	2–1	@ New York Islanders	Parent	14,865	41–14–10	92	W
66	March 14	4–2	St. Louis Blues	Parent	17,007	42–14–10	94	W
67	March 16	4–2	@ Minnesota North Stars	Parent	15,450	43–14–10	96	W
68	March 17	2–2	Toronto Maple Leafs	Parent	17,007	43–14–11	97	T
69	March 21	3–1	Vancouver Canucks	Parent	17,007	44–14–11	99	W
70	March 23	1–3	Chicago Black Hawks	Parent	17,007	44–15–11	99	L
71	March 24	4–1	St. Louis Blues	Parent	17,007	45–15–11	101	W
72	March 27	6–2	@ St. Louis Blues	Parent	18,443	46–15–11	103	W
73	March 28	3–3	@ Atlanta Flames	Parent	15,141	46–15–12	104	T
74	March 30	5–3	Boston Bruins	Parent	17,007	47–15–12	106	W

April: 3–1–0 (home: 2–0–0; road: 1–1–0)

Game	Date	Score	Opponent	Decision	Attendance	Record	Points	Recap
75	April 2	6–3	@ Minnesota North Stars	Taylor	15,110	48–15–12	108	W
76	April 4	4–0	New York Islanders	Parent	17,007	49–15–12	110	W
77	April 6	1–6	@ Pittsburgh Penguins	Taylor	13,368	49–16–12	110	L
78	April 7	6–2	Minnesota North Stars	Parent	17,007	50–16–12	112	W

Legend: W Win (2 points) L Loss (0 points) T Tie (1 point)

=== Playoffs ===
1974 Stanley Cup playoffs
Quarterfinals vs. Atlanta Flames – Flyers win 4–0

Game	Date	Score	Opponent	Decision	Attendance	Series	Recap
1	April 9	4–1	Atlanta Flames	Parent	17,007	Flyers lead 1–0	W
2	April 11	5–1	Atlanta Flames	Parent	17,007	Flyers lead 2–0	W
3	April 12	4–1	@ Atlanta Flames	Parent	15,141	Flyers lead 3–0	W
4	April 14	4–3 OT	@ Atlanta Flames	Parent	15,141	Flyers win 4–0	W

Semifinals vs. New York Rangers – Flyers win 4–3

Game	Date	Score	Opponent	Decision	Attendance	Series	Recap
1	April 20	4–0	New York Rangers	Parent	17,007	Flyers lead 1–0	W
2	April 23	5–2	New York Rangers	Parent	17,007	Flyers lead 2–0	W
3	April 25	3–5	@ New York Rangers	Parent	17,500	Flyers lead 2–1	L
4	April 28	1–2 OT	@ New York Rangers	Parent	17,500	Series tied 2–2	L
5	April 30	4–1	New York Rangers	Parent	17,007	Flyers lead 3–2	W
6	May 2	1–4	@ New York Rangers	Parent	17,500	Series tied 3–3	L
7	May 5	4–3	New York Rangers	Parent	17,007	Flyers win 4–3	W

Stanley Cup Final vs. Boston Bruins – Flyers win 4–2

Game	Date	Score	Opponent	Decision	Attendance	Series	Recap
1	May 7	2–3	@ Boston Bruins	Parent	15,003	Bruins lead 1–0	L
2	May 9	3–2 OT	@ Boston Bruins	Parent	15,003	Series tied 1–1	W
3	May 12	4–1	Boston Bruins	Parent	17,007	Flyers lead 2–1	W
4	May 14	4–2	Boston Bruins	Parent	17,007	Flyers lead 3–1	W
5	May 16	1–5	@ Boston Bruins	Parent	15,003	Flyers lead 3–2	L
6	May 19	1–0	Boston Bruins	Parent	17,007	Flyers win 4–2	W

Legend: W Win L Loss

== Player statistics ==
=== Scoring ===
- Position abbreviations: C = Center; D = Defense; G = Goaltender; LW = Left wing; RW = Right wing

No.	Player	Pos	Regular season						Playoffs					
No.	Player	Pos	GP	G	A	Pts	+/-	PIM	GP	G	A	Pts	+/-	PIM
16	Bobby Clarke	C	77	35	52	87	35	113	17	5	11	16	1	42
19	Rick MacLeish	C	78	32	45	77	21	42	17	13	9	22	0	20
7	Bill Barber	LW	75	34	35	69	34	54	17	3	6	9	2	18
18	Ross Lonsberry	LW	75	32	19	51	16	48	17	4	9	11	0	18
12	Gary Dornhoefer	RW	57	11	39	50	13	125	14	5	6	11	5	43
21	Bill Flett	RW	67	17	27	44	20	51	17	0	6	6	3	21
26	Orest Kindrachuk	C	71	11	30	41	19	85	17	5	4	9	8	17
11	Don Saleski	RW	77	15	25	40	21	131	17	2	7	9	9	24
8	Dave Schultz	LW	73	20	16	36	26	348	17	2	4	6	4	139
17	Simon Nolet	RW	52	19	17	36	28	13	15	1	1	2	0	4
3	Tom Bladon	D	70	12	22	34	24	37	16	4	6	10	3	25
15	Terry Crisp	C	71	10	21	31	12	28	17	2	2	4	3	4
6	Andre Dupont	D	75	3	20	23	34	216	16	4	3	7	5	67
20	Jimmy Watson	D	74	2	18	20	33	44	17	1	2	3	1	41
2	Ed Van Impe	D	77	2	16	18	31	119	17	1	2	3	2	41
14	Joe Watson	D	74	1	17	18	28	34	17	1	4	5	8	24
10	Bill Clement	C	39	9	8	17	15	34	4	1	0	1	2	4
4	Barry Ashbee	D	69	4	13	17	52	52	6	0	0	0	5	2
9	Bob Kelly	LW	65	4	10	14	10	130	5	0	0	0	0	11
1	Bernie Parent	G	73	0	3	3		24	17	0	0	0		4
5	Serge Lajeunesse	D	1	0	0	0	0	0	—	—	—	—	—	—
25	Al MacAdam	RW	5	0	0	0	−2	0	1	0	0	0	−1	0
30	Bobby Taylor	G	7	0	0	0		12	—	—	—	—	—	—
27	Bruce Cowick	LW	—	—	—	—	—	—	8	0	0	0	−1	9

=== Goaltending ===
= Indicates league leader

No.	Player	Regular season											Playoffs									
No.	Player	GP	GS	W	L	T	SA	GA	GAA	SV%	SO	TOI	GP	GS	W	L	SA	GA	GAA	SV%	SO	TOI
1	Bernie Parent	73	73	47	13	12	2006	136	1.89	.932	12	4,307	17	17	12	5	524	35	2.02	.933	2	1,039
30	Bobby Taylor	7	5	3	3	0	203	26	4.26	.872	0	366	—	—	—	—	—	—	—	—	—	—

== Awards and records ==
=== Awards ===
Type	Award/honor	Recipient	Ref
League (annual)	Conn Smythe Trophy	Bernie Parent	
League (annual)	Jack Adams Award	Fred Shero	
League (annual)	Lester B. Pearson Award	Bobby Clarke	
League (annual)	NHL first All-Star team	Bernie Parent (Goaltender)	
League (annual)	NHL second All-Star team	Barry Ashbee (Defense)	
League (annual)	NHL second All-Star team	Bobby Clarke (Center)	
League (annual)	Vezina Trophy	Bernie Parent (Note: Co-winner with Chicago Black Hawks' Tony Esposito)	
League (in-season)	NHL All-Star Game selection	Bobby Clarke	
League (in-season)	NHL All-Star Game selection	Bernie Parent	
League (in-season)	NHL All-Star Game selection	Ed Van Impe	
League (in-season)	NHL All-Star Game selection	Joe Watson	

=== Records ===
Goaltender Bernie Parent set a number of still-standing franchise records in his first season after being re-acquired. Parent set the high marks for games played by a goaltender (73), wins (47, which stood as the NHL record for 33 years), shutouts (12), minutes played (4,307), and save percentage (.932). Likewise, the team as a whole set franchise marks for fewest goals allowed (164) and shutouts (13). Parent also set two streak records. From October 11 through January 10, Parent started 37 consecutive games. During that time, he won 23 games. He also won six consecutive playoff games from April 9 to April 23.

Among other players, Bobby Clarke became the first Flyer to score two shorthanded goals in a single game on March 28, a mark which has been tied but not exceeded five times since. Dave Schultz's 139 penalty minutes during the playoffs is a franchise high. Other playoff single year highs include Tom Bladon's three powerplay goals by a defenseman and Rick MacLeish's four game-winning goals, both of which have been subsequently tied twice. The team's nine wins at home during the playoffs is tied for the franchise high.

=== Milestones ===
Milestone	Player	Date	Ref
First game	Al MacAdam	October 11, 1973	
First game	Bruce Cowick	May 2, 1974	
25th shutout	Bernie Parent	March 3, 1974	

=== Franchise firsts ===
Milestone	Player	Date	Ref
30-win season, goaltender	Bernie Parent	February 10, 1974	
40-win season, goaltender	Bernie Parent	March 16, 1974	

== Transactions ==
The Flyers were involved in the following transactions from May 11, 1973, the day after the deciding game of the 1973 Stanley Cup Final, through May 19, 1974, the day of the deciding game of the 1974 Stanley Cup Final.

=== Trades ===
Date	Details		Ref
May 14, 1973	To Philadelphia Flyers: Serge Lajeunesse	To Detroit Red Wings: Rick Foley	
May 15, 1973	To Philadelphia Flyers: Rights to Bernie Parent; 2nd-round pick in 1973	To Toronto Maple Leafs: 1st-round pick in 1973; Future considerations (Note: If Parent signed with the Flyers the Maple Leafs would receive their choice of goaltender Doug Favell or additional draft picks. Parent was signed on June 22 and the Maple Leafs chose Favell on July 27.)	
May 1973	To Philadelphia Flyers: Jim Stanfield	To Portland Buckaroos (WHL): cash	
May 25, 1973	To Philadelphia Flyers: Bruce Cowick	To San Diego Gulls (WHL): Bob Currier; Bob Hurlburt; Jim Stanfield; Tom Trevelyan	
May 30, 1973	To Philadelphia Flyers: cash	To Toronto Maple Leafs: Willie Brossart	
November 1, 1973	To Philadelphia Flyers: George Pesut	To Detroit Red Wings: Bob Stumpf	
November 30, 1973	To Philadelphia Flyers: Ray Schultz	To St. Louis Blues: Frank Spring	

=== Players acquired ===
Date	Player	Former team	Via	Ref
June 1973	Steve Coates	Michigan Tech University (WCHA)	Free agency	
July 31, 1973	Mark Bousquet	American International College (ECAC 2)	Free agency	
September 1973	Mike Boland	Ottawa Nationals (WHA)	Free agency	

=== Players lost ===
Date	Player	New team	Via	Ref
September 12, 1973	Wayne Hillman	Cleveland Crusaders (WHA)	Free agency	
October 30, 1973	George Swarbrick	Atlanta Flames	Free agency	

=== Signings ===
Date	Player	Term	Ref
June 5, 1973	Mike Clarke		
June 5, 1973	Dale Cook		
June 5, 1973	Bruce Cowick	multi-year	
June 5, 1973	Larry Goodenough		
June 5, 1973	Michel Latreille		
June 5, 1973	Brent Levins		
June 5, 1973	Bob Stumpf		
June 12, 1973	Orest Kindrachuk	multi-year	
June 22, 1973	Bernie Parent	multi-year	
July 31, 1973	Tom Young		
July 31, 1973	Don O'Donahue		
August 20, 1973	Doug Ferguson	3-year	

== Draft picks ==
Philadelphia's picks at the 1973 NHL amateur draft, which was held at the Mount Royal Hotel in Montreal on May 15, 1973.

Round	Pick	Player	Position	Nationality	Team (league)	Notes
2	20	Larry Goodenough	Defense	Canada	London Knights (OHA)	(Note: The Flyers first-round pick, 10th overall, was traded to the Toronto Maple Leafs along with future considerations (Doug Favell) for Bernie Parent and Toronto's second-round pick, 20th overall, on May 15, 1973.)
2	26	Brent Leavins	Left wing	Canada	Swift Current Broncos (WCHL)	
3	40	Bob Stumpf	Right wing	Canada	New Westminster Bruins (WCHL)	(Note: The Flyers traded Brent Hughes and Pierre Plante to the St. Louis Blues for Andre Dupont and St. Louis' third-round pick, 40th overall, on December 14, 1972.)
3	42	Mike Clarke	Center	Canada	Calgary Centennials (WCHL)	
4	58	Dale Cook	Left wing	Canada	Victoria Cougars (WCHL)	
5	74	Michel Latreille	Defense	Canada	Montreal Red White and Blue (QMJHL)	
6	90	Doug Ferguson	Defense	Canada	Hamilton Red Wings (OHA)	
7	106	Tom Young	Forward	Canada	Sudbury Wolves (OHA)	
8	122	Norm Barnes	Defense	Canada	Michigan State University (CCHA)	
9	137	Dan O'Donohue	Defense	Canada	Sault Ste. Marie Greyhounds (OHA)	
10	153	Brian Dick	Right wing	Canada	Winnipeg Jets (WCHL)	

== Farm teams ==
The Flyers were affiliated with the Richmond Robins of the AHL and the San Diego Gulls of the WHL. Rene Drolet led the Robins with 73 points and Richmond finished 4th in their division and lost in five games to the Baltimore Clippers in the first round of the playoffs. San Diego finished third in the six-team WHL's final season in existence. The Gulls also ceased operations once the Jersey Knights of the WHA moved to San Diego and became the San Diego Mariners.
