= Broad Street Bullies (film) =

- Genre: Documentary
- Written by: Erik Kesten
- Narrated by: Liev Schreiber
- Country of origin: United States
- Original language: English

Production
- Producers: Ross Greenburg; Rick Bernstein; George Roy
- Running time: 58 minutes 22 seconds

Original release
- Network: HBO (HBO Sports)
- Release: May 4 – June 1, 2010

Broad Street Bullies is a 2010 documentary film produced and directed by veteran documentary filmmaker George Roy for HBO Sports. It chronicles the National Hockey League's (NHL) Philadelphia Flyers from their beginnings as an expansion team in 1967, to their back-to-back Stanley Cup championships (1974, 1975), and three straight Stanley Cup Final appearances (1974–1976).

The film includes clips and photos from the era, along with interviews with players, writers, broadcasters, and other individuals involved with the Flyers and/or NHL hockey during that period. It is narrated by Liev Schreiber.

== Overview ==
Broad Street Bullies begins with the line, "In any great drama, you need heroes and villains. The Flyers were both." The film then gives a brief history of ice hockey and the National Hockey League. It tells of founder Ed Snider's quest to bring an expansion team to Philadelphia, then follows the creation of the team and the city's initial unenthusiastic response to the new team. The documentary shows how the early Flyers were physically beaten by the St. Louis Blues, and their consequent decisions to bring in bigger and tougher players, so as not to be pushed around in the post season. This resulted in an aggressive team that bent rules, and used fighting and intimidation as a tactic – nicknamed the "Broad Street Bullies".

Broad Street Bullies profiles Dave "The Hammer" Schultz, his impact on the team, and influence on the development of a new attitude towards ice hockey in Philadelphia. Schultz was critical in the team's first post-season series win. The documentary then describes the re-acquisition of goaltender Bernie Parent, with a minor biographical section on him. It then illustrates the talent on the Philadelphia roster, and examines the relationship between the Flyers organization and the city of Philadelphia, highlighting the problems, both economic and sports-related, of the city and its new love affair with the team.

After a brief look at the Flyers' success in the 1973–74 regular season, head coach Fred "the Fog" Shero is introduced. It then looks at the Flyers-Rangers series that resulted in the first expansion team defeating an Original Six team in a playoff series. The film then examines the Flyers' Stanley Cup Final series against the Boston Bruins. The documentary also covers the odd relationship between singer Kate Smith and the Flyers' team. It then focuses on the final game of the series, which culminated in the Flyers' first Stanley Cup championship, as well as the response by fans. The documentary explores the dichotomy between the love of the team in Philadelphia and the hate it generated in other cities, epitomized by Flyer great Bobby Clarke. A brief mention is made of the LCB line (Reggie Leach-Clarke-Bill Barber).

The post-season title defense of the Stanley Cup begins with a section on the Islanders coming back from a 3–0 deficit to tie the series, and the Flyers' favorite bar, Rexy's, burning down. It moves on to the Flyers' second Stanley Cup Final series against the Buffalo Sabres and the oddities of the series, including a game played in fog, and a bat flying around the ice. Several clips are shown of the Flyers winning their second Cup, and of the players' fathers being on hand to celebrate the championship with their sons. The documentary then returns to Schultz and a song he recorded, and examines his fighting tendency and the impact it had on other teams around the league. It also looks at how the game itself was affected by the Flyers' aggressive style.

The film then turns its attention to an exhibition game against the Russian Red Army team, examining the importance of the game, both in terms of culture and sport, and highlighting the Flyers' victory. The film then shows how the Flyers forced the NHL to institute new rules to clean up the game.

In covering the "Bullies" third Stanley Cup Final appearance against the Montreal Canadiens, the film illustrates the differences between the Flyers' aggressive, physical style, and the Canadians' traditional skill game; and looking at the impact Larry Robinson had in the series as a physical force for Montreal. After discussing the Flyers' defeat, the documentary wraps up with players from the team talking about their legacy and how they would not change the way they played. This is followed by a summary of the "Bullies" era, and the team's lasting impact in Philadelphia.

== Reaction ==
Broad Street Bullies received several positive reviews. Senior NHL writer Chris Botta called the documentary "outstanding" and said, "What Boogie Nights was to the adult film industry, HBO's doc is to the most notorious team in NHL history." Yahoo's Greg Wyshynski provided 10 top reasons to watch the documentary and gave it an overall grade of B. Wyshynski stated that the grade was only a "B because the film loses a bit of steam at the end and fails to carry some of the more interesting aspects of its narrative through the story. For Philly fans, it may not offer more than you already know about the Bullies, and there's hardly any connection to the current team."

Keith Groller called the film "the latest in a long line of well-done sports documentaries by HBO". He further states, "this hour-long production provides a great trip down memory lane". Steve Lepore of Puck the Media called it unfocused at times, but "overall a fantastic, gritty, winning production." Flyers Chairman Ed Snider refers to the film as "an excellent and well-produced documentary that portrays the evolution of the Philadelphia Flyers", and states that "It brings back many wonderful memories for me, and it uncovers some new insights into the great story of our two Stanley Cup championship teams. We are truly honored that this part of Philadelphia Flyers' history will be seen nationally on HBO." Snider was not the only former member of Flyers' personnel to be moved by the film. Former goalie Bernie Parent was brought to tears during an advance screening at the Wells Fargo Center. When asked about his emotions, Parent said, "We're getting older. With the sadness, there's joy involved. It's difficult to share the feelings right now."

The positive reviews were not limited to sports fans. The New York Post's TV critic, Linda Stasi states, "You don't have to be a hockey fan to love Broad Street Bullies or the team that inspired this hilarious, hell-raising hockey doc." Stasi, who says she doesn't understand the fascination with watching sports, further said, "I am not the audience and yet, I couldn't stop watching it, couldn't stop laughing and couldn't stop rooting for the most ill-mannered, unsportsmanlike, toothless and ruthless team ever to take the ice."

== Cast (Interviews) ==
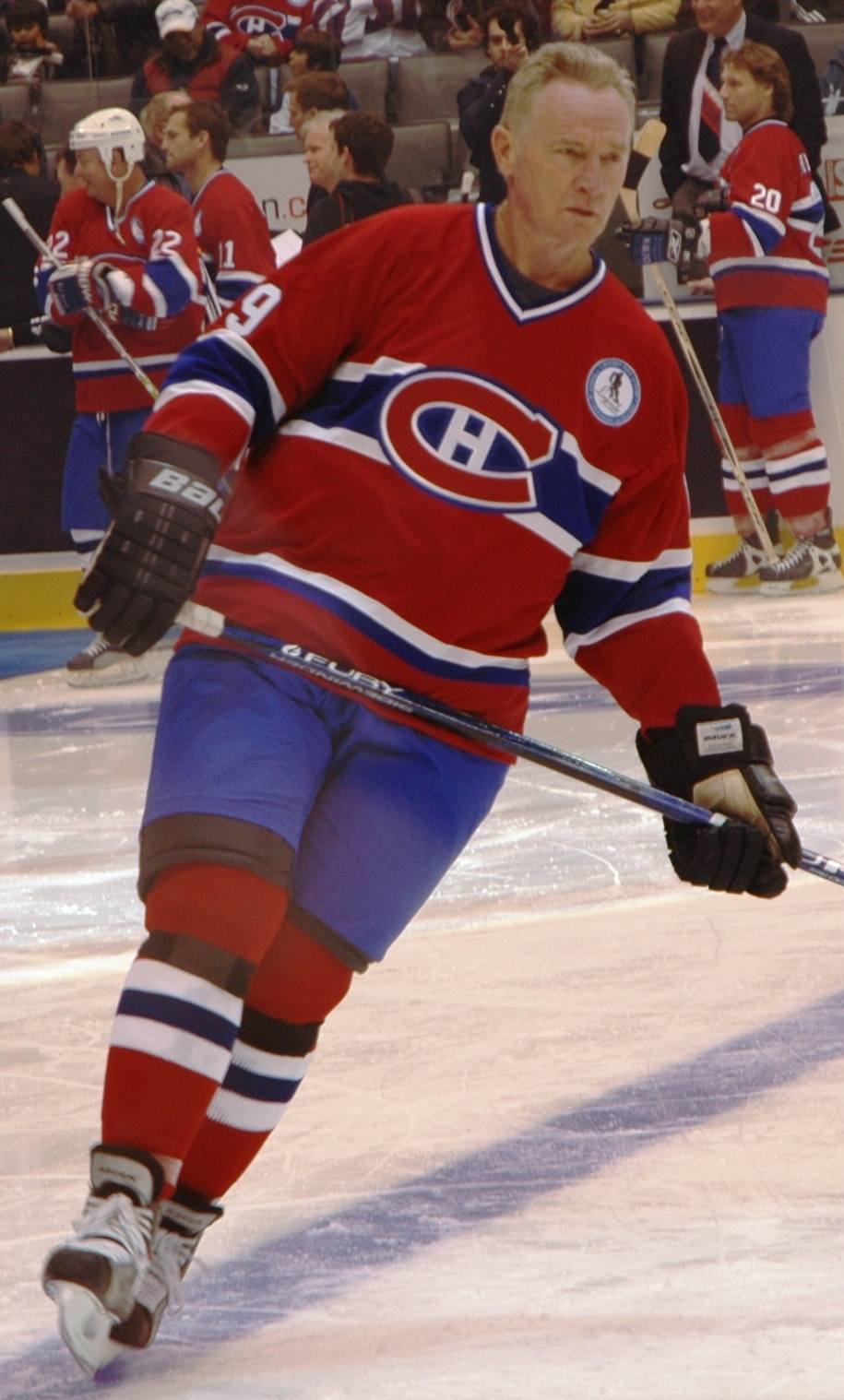
Larry Robinson was interviewed for the documentary.

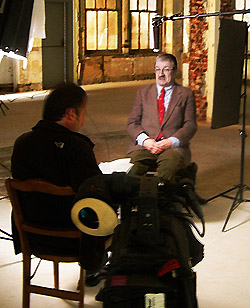
The HBO film's producer George Roy conducting one of its two dozen interviews with hockey historian Bruce "Scoop" Cooper.

Interviews with the following individuals were filmed and appeared in the documentary as themselves:

- Bill "Arnie" Barber (Flyers' left wing 1972–1985; scout; former head coach)
- Jack Chevalier (Sportswriter, Philadelphia Bulletin)
- Bob Clarke (Flyers' center and captain 1969–1984; former GM)
- Bill "Duke" Clement (Flyers' center 1971–1975; broadcaster)
- Bruce "Scoop" Cooper (Flyers', NHL, and AHL hockey historian; hockey writer and broadcaster)
- Gary "Otto" Dornhoefer (Flyers' right wing 1967–1978; broadcaster)
- Howard Eskin (WIP Radio host)
- Phil Esposito (Boston Bruins' center 1967–1976)
- Anthony Gargano (WIP Radio host)
- Jay Greenberg (Sports columnist, Philadelphia Bulletin; Philadelphia Daily News; New York Post)
- Stu Hackel (former NHL Director of Broadcasting; New York Times hockey blogger; Sports Illustrated hockey blogger)
- Bob "Hound" Kelly (Flyers' left wing 1970–1980)
- Orest "O" Kindrachuk (Flyers' center 1972–1978)
- Bryan Lewis (retired NHL referee; former Director of Officiating)
- Mark Mulvoy (Sportswriter, Sports Illustrated)
- Terry O'Reilly (Boston Bruins' right wing 1971–1985)
- Bernie Parent (Flyers' goaltender 1967–1971; 1973–1979)
- Larry Robinson (Montreal Canadiens' defenseman 1972–1989)
- Don "Big Bird" Saleski (Flyers' right wing 1971–1979)
- Dave "The Hammer" Schultz (Flyers' left wing 1971–1976)
- Edward M. Snider (Flyers' and Comcast-Spectacor Chairman)
- Bobby "Chief" Taylor (Flyers' goaltender 1971–1976; broadcaster)
- Ed Van Impe (Flyers' defenseman 1967–1976, broadcaster)
- Joe Watson (Flyers' defenseman 1967–1978)

== See also ==
- List of films about ice hockey
