= 1976 Stanley Cup Final =

1976 ice hockey championship series

| | 1 | 2 | 3 | 4 | Total |
|---|---|---|---|---|---|
| Montreal Canadiens | 4 | 2 | 3 | 5 | 4 |
| Philadelphia Flyers | 3 | 1 | 2 | 3 | 0 |
- Location(s): Montreal: Montreal Forum (1, 2); Philadelphia: Spectrum (3, 4)
- Coaches: Montreal: Scotty Bowman; Philadelphia: Fred Shero
- Captains: Montreal: Yvan Cournoyer; Philadelphia: Bobby Clarke
- National anthems: Montreal: Roger Doucet; Philadelphia: Kate Smith
- Referees: Ron Wicks (1); Dave Newell (2); Wally Harris (3); Lloyd Gilmour (4)
- Dates: May 9–16, 1976
- MVP: Reggie Leach (Flyers)
- Series-winning goal: Guy Lafleur (14:18, third)
- Hall of Famers: Canadiens: Yvan Cournoyer (1982); Ken Dryden (1983); Bob Gainey (1992); Guy Lafleur (1988); Guy Lapointe (1993); Jacques Lemaire (1984); Larry Robinson (1995); Serge Savard (1986); Steve Shutt (1993); Flyers: Bill Barber (1990); Bobby Clarke (1987); Bernie Parent (1984; did not play); Coaches: Scotty Bowman (1991); Fred Shero (2013); Officials: Neil Armstrong (1991); John D'Amico (1993); Matt Pavelich (1987)
- Networks: Canada: (English): CBC (French): SRC; United States: (English): NHL Network (national), WTXF-TV (Philadelphia)
- Announcers: (CBC) Danny Gallivan and Dick Irvin Jr. (SRC) Rene Lecavalier and Gilles Tremblay (NHLN) Marv Albert (1, 3–4), Ted Darling (2), Stan Mikita (1), Garry Unger (2), Chico Resch (3), and Curt Bennett (4) (WTXF-TV) Don Earle and Gene Hart

The 1976 Stanley Cup Final was the championship series of the National Hockey League's (NHL) 1975–76 season, and the culmination of the 1976 Stanley Cup playoffs. It was contested by the two-time defending Stanley Cup champion Philadelphia Flyers, making their third consecutive finals appearance, and the Montreal Canadiens. This was the Canadiens first appearance in the Final since their Cup win in 1973. The Canadiens swept the series to win their 19th Stanley Cup in franchise history, denying the Flyers a three-peat.

This marked the first of what is currently six consecutive losses in the Cup Final for the Flyers, as they would lose in the Final again in 1980, 1985, 1987, 1997, and 2010.

== Paths to the Finals ==
Montreal defeated the Chicago Black Hawks 4–0 and the New York Islanders 4–1 to advance to the final.

Philadelphia defeated the Toronto Maple Leafs 4–3 and the Boston Bruins 4–1 to make it to the final.

== Game summaries ==
Guy Lafleur scored the first two finals goals in his career, both game-winners. Flyers goaltender Bernie Parent would not play during the Finals as he had lost the starting job to Wayne Stephenson after struggling to maintain consistency during the regular season as he was dealing with constant pain from a herniated disc and radiculopathy he had suffered during the preseason.

Reggie Leach scored four goals in the Finals, and nineteen times in total in the playoffs to win the Conn Smythe Trophy even though the Flyers lost the Cup to the Canadiens. He is one of the only two non-goaltenders in NHL history to be named MVP of the playoffs in an unsuccessful cause, and the third of only six as of today. His accomplishment followed Roger Crozier (Detroit Red Wings, in 1966) and Glenn Hall (St. Louis Blues, 1968) and preceded Ron Hextall (Philadelphia, 1987), Jean-Sebastien Giguere (Mighty Ducks of Anaheim, 2003) and Connor McDavid (Edmonton Oilers, 2024).

=== Game one ===
| May 9 | Philadelphia Flyers | 3–4 | Montreal Canadiens | Montreal Forum | Recap |

Scoring summary
| Period | Team | Goal | Assist(s) | Time | Score |
|---|---|---|---|---|---|
| 1st | PHI | Reggie Leach (16) | Bobby Clarke (12) and Jack McIlhargey (3) | 00:21 | 1–0 PHI |
| 1st | PHI | Ross Lonsberry (4) | Mel Bridgman (7) and Tom Bladon (4) | 13:22 | 2–0 PHI |
| 2nd | MTL | Jim Roberts (3) | Bob Gainey (3) and Doug Risebrough (2) | 04:04 | 2–1 PHI |
| 2nd | MTL | Larry Robinson (3) | Pete Mahovlich (5) and Guy Lafleur (6) | 06:30 | 2–2 |
| 3rd | PHI | Larry Goodenough (3) – pp | Gary Dornhoefer (4) | 05:17 | 3–2 PHI |
| 3rd | MTL | Jacques Lemaire (2) | Bill Nyrop (3) | 10:02 | 3–3 |
| 3rd | MTL | Guy Lapointe (3) | Steve Shutt (6) | 18:38 | 4–3 MTL |
Penalty summary
| Period | Team | Player | Penalty | Time | PIM |
| 1st | PHI | Tom Bladon | Elbowing | 02:32 | 2:00 |
| 1st | MTL | Pete Mahovlich | Roughing | 09:28 | 2:00 |
| 1st | PHI | Gary Dornhoefer | Tripping | 11:05 | 2:00 |
| 1st | MTL | Mario Tremblay | Roughing | 14:34 | 2:00 |
| 1st | PHI | Dave Schultz | Roughing – double minor | 14:34 | 4:00 |
| 1st | MTL | Pete Mahovlich | Roughing | 17:09 | 2:00 |
| 1st | PHI | Bobby Clarke | Roughing | 17:09 | 2:00 |
| 2nd | MTL | Yvon Lambert | Roughing – double minor | 05:59 | 4:00 |
| 2nd | PHI | Don Saleski | Roughing | 05:59 | 2:00 |
| 2nd | MTL | Bob Gainey | High-sticking | 11:50 | 2:00 |
| 2nd | PHI | Jimmy Watson | Slashing | 11:50 | 2:00 |
| 2nd | PHI | Joe Watson | Holding | 13:44 | 2:00 |
| 2nd | MTL | Bob Gainey | Elbowing | 16:26 | 2:00 |
| 2nd | PHI | Mel Bridgman | Roughing | 16:26 | 2:00 |
| 3rd | MTL | Pierre Bouchard | Holding | 04:09 | 2:00 |
| 3rd | PHI | Dave Schultz | Hooking | 06:29 | 2:00 |

Shots by period
| Team | 1 | 2 | 3 | Total |
|---|---|---|---|---|
| Philadelphia | 4 | 8 | 8 | 20 |
| Montreal | 11 | 16 | 9 | 36 |

=== Game two ===
| May 11 | Philadelphia Flyers | 1–2 | Montreal Canadiens | Montreal Forum | Recap |

Scoring summary
| Period | Team | Goal | Assist(s) | Time | Score |
|---|---|---|---|---|---|
| 1st | None | | | | |
| 2nd | MTL | Jacques Lemaire (3) – sh | Unassisted | 15:19 | 1–0 MTL |
| 3rd | MTL | Guy Lafleur (6) | Unassisted | 02:41 | 2–0 MTL |
| 3rd | PHI | Dave Schultz (2) | Tom Bladon (5) | 17:35 | 2–1 MTL |
Penalty summary
| Period | Team | Player | Penalty | Time | PIM |
| 1st | MTL | Guy Lafleur | Tripping | 08:44 | 2:00 |
| 1st | PHI | Jimmy Watson | Hooking | 11:44 | 2:00 |
| 1st | MTL | Guy Lapointe | High-sticking | 16:54 | 2:00 |
| 2nd | PHI | Bill Barber | Charging | 07:46 | 2:00 |
| 2nd | PHI | Andre Dupont | Hooking | 11:29 | 2:00 |
| 2nd | MTL | Guy Lapointe | Holding | 14:17 | 2:00 |
| 2nd | MTL | Mario Tremblay | Fighting – major | 14:17 | 5:00 |
| 2nd | PHI | Andre Dupont | Fighting – major | 14:17 | 5:00 |
| 3rd | MTL | Larry Robinson | Boarding | 11:20 | 2:00 |

Shots by period
| Team | 1 | 2 | 3 | Total |
|---|---|---|---|---|
| Philadelphia | 9 | 8 | 9 | 26 |
| Montreal | 6 | 8 | 5 | 19 |

=== Game three ===
| May 13 | Montreal Canadiens | 3–2 | Philadelphia Flyers | The Spectrum | Recap |

Scoring summary
| Period | Team | Goal | Assist(s) | Time | Score |
|---|---|---|---|---|---|
| 1st | MTL | Steve Shutt (5) – pp | Guy Lafleur (7) | 03:17 | 1–0 MTL |
| 1st | PHI | Reggie Leach (17) – pp | Bobby Clarke (13) and Larry Goodenough (11) | 08:40 | 1–1 |
| 1st | PHI | Reggie Leach (18) | Unassited | 18:14 | 2–1 PHI |
| 2nd | MTL | Steve Shutt (6) – pp | Guy Lafleur (8) and Pete Mahovlich (6) | 01:09 | 2–2 |
| 3rd | MTL | Pierre Bouchard (1) | Murray Wilson (1) | 09:16 | 3–2 MTL |
Penalty summary
| Period | Team | Player | Penalty | Time | PIM |
| 1st | PHI | Bill Barber | Elbowing | 01:52 | 2:00 |
| 1st | MTL | Doug Risebrough | High-sticking | 08:02 | 2:00 |
| 1st | MTL | Bob Gainey | Elbowing | 09:18 | 2:00 |
| 1st | PHI | Mel Bridgman | Hooking | 15:45 | 2:00 |
| 1st | PHI | Gary Dornhoefer | Elbowing | 19:59 | 2:00 |
| 2nd | MTL | Bill Nyrop | Interference | 02:38 | 2:00 |
| 2nd | PHI | Jack McIlhargey | Tripping | 05:47 | 2:00 |
| 2nd | MTL | Larry Robinson | Roughing | 09:57 | 2:00 |
| 2nd | MTL | Bob Gainey | Roughing | 09:57 | 2:00 |
| 2nd | PHI | Bob Kelly | Roughing | 09:57 | 2:00 |
| 2nd | PHI | Jack McIlhargey | Roughing | 09:57 | 2:00 |
| 3rd | None | | | | |

Shots by period
| Team | 1 | 2 | 3 | Total |
|---|---|---|---|---|
| Montreal | 5 | 13 | 7 | 25 |
| Philadelphia | 9 | 6 | 7 | 22 |

=== Game four ===
| May 16 | Montreal Canadiens | 5–3 | Philadelphia Flyers | The Spectrum | Recap |

Scoring summary
| Period | Team | Goal | Assist(s) | Time | Score |
|---|---|---|---|---|---|
| 1st | PHI | Reggie Leach (19) | Mel Bridgman (8) | 00:40 | 1–0 PHI |
| 1st | MTL | Steve Shutt (7) – pp | Yvan Cournoyer (6) and Pete Mahovlich (7) | 05:35 | 1–1 |
| 1st | MTL | Pierre Bouchard (2) – pp | Doug Risebrough (3) | 11:48 | 2–1 MTL |
| 1st | PHI | Bill Barber (6) – pp | Tom Bladon (6) and Andre Dupont (2) | 18:20 | 2–2 |
| 2nd | PHI | Andre Dupont (2) – pp | Bill Barber (7) and Bobby Clarke (14) | 13:59 | 3–2 PHI |
| 2nd | MTL | Yvan Cournoyer (3) – pp | Larry Robinson (6) and Guy Lafleur (9) | 19:49 | 3–3 |
| 3rd | MTL | Guy Lafleur (7) | Pete Mahovlich (8) and Steve Shutt (7) | 14:18 | 4–3 MTL |
| 3rd | MTL | Pete Mahovlich (4) | Guy Lafleur (10) and Steve Shutt (8) | 15:16 | 5–3 MTL |
Penalty summary
| Period | Team | Player | Penalty | Time | PIM |
| 1st | MTL | Serge Savard | Roughing | 00:29 | 2:00 |
| 1st | PHI | Dave Schultz | Roughing – double minor | 00:29 | 4:00 |
| 1st | PHI | Don Saleski | Interference | 03:44 | 2:00 |
| 1st | PHI | Bill Barber | High-sticking | 09:54 | 2:00 |
| 1st | PHI | Guy Lapointe | Holding | 17:32 | 2:00 |
| 2nd | MTL | Bob Gainey | Slashing | 00:21 | 2:00 |
| 2nd | PHI | Bobby Clarke | Slashing | 00:21 | 2:00 |
| 2nd | MTL | Guy Lapointe | Tripping | 12:43 | 2:00 |
| 2nd | MTL | Jacques Lemaire | Tripping | 17:20 | 2:00 |
| 2nd | PHI | Gary Dornhoefer | Hooking | 17:53 | 2:00 |
| 3rd | PHI | Larry Goodenough | Interference | 09:03 | 2:00 |
| 3rd | MTL | Bob Gainey | Holding | 11:26 | 2:00 |

Shots by period
| Team | 1 | 2 | 3 | Total |
|---|---|---|---|---|
| Montreal | 11 | 7 | 12 | 30 |
| Philadelphia | 7 | 9 | 8 | 24 |

== Team rosters ==
=== Montreal Canadiens ===
| No. | Nat | Player | Pos | S/G | Age | Acquired | Birthplace |
|---|---|---|---|---|---|---|---|
| 1 | (Canada) | Michel Larocque | G | L | 24 | 1972 | Hull, Quebec |
| 2 | (United States) | Bill Nyrop | D | L | 23 | 1972 | Washington, D.C. |
| 3 | (Canada) | John Van Boxmeer | D | R | 23 | 1972 | Petrolia, Ontario |
| 5 | (Canada) | Guy Lapointe | D | L | 28 | 1969 | Montreal, Quebec |
| 6 | (Canada) | Jimmy Roberts | RW | R | 36 | 1971 | Toronto, Ontario |
| 8 | (Canada) | Doug Risebrough | C | L | 22 | 1974 | Guelph, Ontario |
| 10 | (Canada) | Guy Lafleur | RW | R | 24 | 1971 | Thurso, Quebec |
| 11 | (Canada) | Yvon Lambert | LW | L | 25 | 1971 | Drummondville, Quebec |
| 12 | (Canada) | Yvan Cournoyer (C) | RW | L | 32 | 1963 | Montreal, Quebec |
| 14 | (Canada) | Mario Tremblay | RW | R | 19 | 1974 | Alma, Quebec |
| 17 | (Canada) | Murray Wilson | LW | L | 24 | 1971 | Toronto, Canada |
| 18 | (Canada) | Serge Savard | D | L | 30 | 1966 | Landrienne, Quebec |
| 19 | (Canada) | Larry Robinson | D | L | 24 | 1971 | Winchester, Ontario |
| 20 | (Canada) | Peter Mahovlich | C | L | 29 | 1969 | Timmins, Ontario |
| 21 | (Canada) | Doug Jarvis | C | L | 21 | 1975 | Brantford, Ontario |
| 22 | (Canada) | Steve Shutt | LW | L | 23 | 1972 | North York, Ontario |
| 23 | (Canada) | Bob Gainey | LW | L | 21 | 1973 | Peterborough, Ontario |
| 24 | (Canada) | Don Awrey | D | L | 32 | 1975 | Kitchener, Ontario |
| 25 | (Canada) | Jacques Lemaire | C | L | 30 | 1967 | LaSalle, Quebec |
| 26 | (Canada) | Pierre Bouchard | D | L | 28 | 1965 | Longueuil, Quebec |
| 27 | (United States) | Rick Chartraw | D | R | 21 | 1974 | Caracas, Venezuela |
| 29 | (Canada) | Ken Dryden | G | L | 28 | 1964 | Hamilton, Ontario |

=== Philadelphia Flyers ===
| No. | Nat | Player | Pos | S/G | Age | Acquired | Birthplace |
|---|---|---|---|---|---|---|---|
| 1 | (Canada) | Bernie Parent | G | L | 31 | 1973 | Montreal, Quebec |
| 3 | (Canada) | Tom Bladon | D | R | 23 | 1972 | Edmonton, Alberta |
| 5 | (Canada) | Larry Goodenough | D | R | 23 | 1973 | Toronto, Ontario |
| 6 | (Canada) | Andre Dupont | D | L | 26 | 1972 | Trois-Rivières, Quebec |
| 7 | (Canada) | Bill Barber | LW | L | 23 | 1972 | Callander, Ontario |
| 8 | (Canada) | Dave Schultz | LW | L | 26 | 1969 | Waldheim, Saskatchewan |
| 9 | (Canada) | Bob Kelly | LW | L | 25 | 1970 | Oakville, Ontario |
| 10 | (Canada) | Mel Bridgman | C | L | 21 | 1975 | Trenton, Ontario |
| 11 | (Canada) | Don Saleski | RW | R | 26 | 1972 | Moose Jaw, Saskatchewan |
| 12 | (Canada) | Gary Dornhoefer | RW | R | 33 | 1967 | Kitchener, Ontario |
| 14 | (Canada) | Joe Watson | D | L | 32 | 1967 | Smithers, British Columbia |
| 15 | (Canada) | Terry Crisp | C | L | 32 | 1973 | Parry Sound, Ontario |
| 16 | (Canada) | Bobby Clarke (C) | C | L | 26 | 1969 | Flin Flon, Manitoba |
| 18 | (Canada) | Ross Lonsberry | LW | L | 29 | 1972 | Watson, Saskatchewan |
| 20 | (Canada) | Jim Watson | D | L | 23 | 1972 | Smithers, British Columbia |
| 25 | (Canada) | Terry Murray | D | L | 25 | 1975 | Shawville, Quebec |
| 26 | (Canada) | Orest Kindrachuk | C | L | 25 | 1972 | Nanton, Alberta |
| 27 | (Canada) | Reggie Leach | RW | R | 26 | 1974 | Riverton, Manitoba |
| 29 | (Canada) | Jack McIlhargey | D | L | 24 | 1975 | Edmonton, Alberta |
| 35 | (Canada) | Wayne Stephenson | G | L | 31 | 1974 | Fort William, Ontario |

== Stanley Cup engraving ==
The 1976 Stanley Cup was presented to Canadiens captain Yvan Cournoyer by NHL President Clarence Campbell following the Canadiens 5–3 win over the Flyers in game four.

The following Canadiens players and staff had their names engraved on the Stanley Cup

1975–76 Montreal Canadiens

=== Players ===
Centres

- 8 Doug Risebrough
- 20 Peter Mahovlich
- 21 Doug Jarvis
- 25 Jacques Lemaire

Wingers

- 6 Jim Roberts
- 10 Guy Lafleur
- 11 Yvon Lambert
- 12 Yvan Cournoyer (Captain)
- 14 Mario Tremblay
- 17 Murray Wilson
- 22 Steve Shutt
- 23 Bob Gainey

Defencemen

- 2 Bill Nyrop
- 3 John van Boxmeer^
- 5 Guy Lapointe
- 18 Serge Savard
- 19 Larry Robinson
- 24 Don Awrey^
- 26 Pierre Bouchard
- 27 Rick Chartraw

Goaltenders

- 1 Michel Larocque
- 29 Ken Dryden

=== Coaching and administrative staff ===
- Jacques Courtois (President), Jean Beliveau (Vice President – Director of Cooperate Relations)
- Peter Bronfman (Chairman/Owner), Edward Bronfman (Executive Director/Owner)
- Sam Pollock (Vice President/General Manager), William Scotty Bowman (Head Coach)
- Eddy Palchak (Trainer), Pierre Meilleur (Asst Trainer)
- Claude Ruel (Director of Player Development)
- Floyd Curry (Asst. General Manager), Ron Caron* (Asst. General Manager)

=== Stanley Cup engraving ===
- #24 Don Awrey^ (D) played in 72 regular-season games. #3 John van Boxmeer^ (D) played in 46 regular-season games. As neither player played in the playoffs, their names were not included on the Stanley Cup. The official rules say that players must play in the playoffs to be included on the Stanley Cup, but this rule was not followed very well. Players who played in the playoffs were often left off, and many players who did not play in the playoffs were still engraved on it. The NHL changed the rules to say that any player who played at least 40 games (half the regular-season game total) or more for the winning team, or one game in the Stanley Cup Final, must be included. However, Awrey and Van Boxmeer were not added to the cup for 1976. Awrey's name is on the Cup in 1970, 1972 with Boston. Van Boxmeer's name does not appear on the Stanley Cup.
- Murray Wilson's name was misspelled in 1973, 1976, 1977 as MURRY WILSON, missing an "A". Murray Wilson was spelled correctly on the Stanley Cup in 1978. Wilson's name was also spelled correctly all 4 times on the Replica Cup.
- Between 1976 and 1985, an "A" (alternate captain) was no longer marked on players' sweaters. Only the captain was marked with a "C."
- American Rick Chartraw was born in Venezuela and was the first South American-born player to win the Stanley Cup.

== See also ==
- 1975–76 NHL season

== Notes ==
| Preceded by Philadelphia Flyers; 1975 | Montreal Canadiens; Stanley Cup champions 1976 | Succeeded by Montreal Canadiens; 1977 |
