= 1974 Stanley Cup Final =

1974 ice hockey championship series

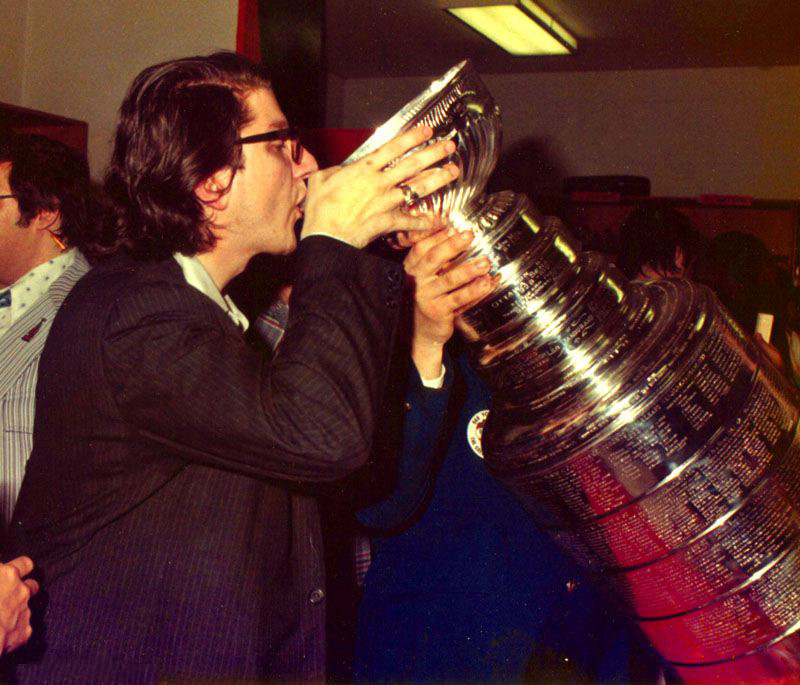
- Celebration in the Flyers' locker room on May 19, 1974
	1	2	3	4	5	6	Total
Philadelphia Flyers	2	3*	4	4	1	1	4
Boston Bruins	3	2*	1	2	5	0	2
- * – Denotes overtime period(s)
- Location(s): Philadelphia: Spectrum (3, 4, 6); Boston: Boston Garden (1, 2, 5)
- Coaches: Philadelphia: Fred Shero; Boston: Bep Guidolin
- Captains: Philadelphia: Bobby Clarke; Boston: John Bucyk
- National anthems: Philadelphia: Kate Smith; Boston: Unknown
- Referees: Dave Newell (1, 5); Art Skov (2, 6); Lloyd Gilmour (3); Ron Wicks (4)
- Dates: May 7–19, 1974
- MVP: Bernie Parent (Flyers)
- Series-winning goal: Rick MacLeish (14:48, first)
- Hall of Famers: Flyers: Bill Barber (1990); Bobby Clarke (1987); Bernie Parent (1984); Bruins: Johnny Bucyk (1981); Phil Esposito (1984); Bobby Orr (1979); Coaches: Fred Shero (2013); Officials: Neil Armstrong (1991); John D'Amico (1993); Matt Pavelich (1987)
- Networks: Canada: (English): CBC (French): SRC; United States: (National): NBC (3, 6) (Philadelphia area): WTAF (1–2, 5) (Boston area): WSBK (1–2, 4–5)
- Announcers: (CBC) Danny Gallivan and Brian McFarlane (1–2, 5); and Bill Hewitt and Dick Irvin, Jr. (3–4, 6) (SRC) Rene Lecavalier and Gilles Tremblay (NBC) Tim Ryan and Ted Lindsay (WTAF) Don Earle and Gene Hart (WSBK) Fred Cusick and Johnny Peirson

The 1974 Stanley Cup Final was the championship series of the National Hockey League's (NHL) 1973–74 season, and the culmination of the 1974 Stanley Cup playoffs. It was contested between the Boston Bruins and the Philadelphia Flyers. The Flyers made their first Finals appearance and the Bruins returned to the Finals for the third time in five years, having won the Stanley Cup in 1970 and 1972. The Flyers won the best-of-seven series, four games to two, becoming the first team from the 1967 Expansion to win the Stanley Cup, as well as the first non-Original Six Cup champion since the Montreal Maroons in 1935, and the first non-Original Six team to appear in the Final since they stopped being guaranteed a spot after Chicago switched divisions in 1970.

== Paths to the Final ==
Boston defeated the Toronto Maple Leafs 4–0 and the Chicago Black Hawks 4–2 to advance to the final.

Philadelphia defeated the Atlanta Flames 4–0 and the New York Rangers 4–3 to make it to the final.

== Game summaries ==
In the previous 19 games against the Bruins in Boston, the Flyers had lost 17 and tied two. Boston had the best regular season record in the league finishing one point ahead of the Flyers. The Bruins also had home ice advantage in the Stanley Cup Final, and were made heavy favorites to win the series. A key confidence-building win late in the regular season saw the Flyers defeating the Bruins 5–3 at the Spectrum in Philadelphia.

=== Game one ===
May 7	Philadelphia Flyers	2–3	Boston Bruins	Boston Garden	Recap

In game one, the Flyers nearly scored late in the third period to break a 2–2 tie. Bobby Orr, having saved the Flyers' shot by blocking the open Boston net with his leg, then took the puck up the ice and scored on a slapshot past goaltender Bernie Parent with a little over a minute remaining in regulation time to propel the Bruins to a 3–2 win.

Scoring summary
Period	Team	Goal	Assist(s)	Time	Score
1st	BOS	Wayne Cashman (4) – pp	Bobby Orr (11) and Carol Vadnais (10)	12:05	1–0 BOS
1st	BOS	Gregg Sheppard (10)	Dave Forbes (2) and Dallas Smith (6)	13:01	2–0 BOS
2nd	PHI	Orest Kindrachuk (4)	Jimmy Watson (3) and Don Saleski (5)	07:47	2–1 BOS
3rd	PHI	Bobby Clarke (3)	Jimmy Watson (4) and Simon Nolet (1)	05:32	2–2
3rd	BOS	Bobby Orr (2)	Ken Hodge (7) and Wayne Cashman (8)	19:38	3–2 BOS
Penalty summary
Period	Team	Player	Penalty	Time	PIM
1st	BOS	Al Sims	Elbowing	01:07	2:00
1st	PHI	Andre Dupont	Holding	03:24	2:00
1st	PHI	Bill Barber	Interference	10:52	2:00
1st	BOS	Dallas Smith	Tripping	15:09	2:00
1st	BOS	Ken Hodge	Roughing	17:51	2:00
1st	PHI	Andre Dupont	Roughing	17:51	2:00
1st	PHI	Ed Van Impe	Hooking	18:28	2:00
2nd	PHI	Tom Bladon	Holding	04:45	2:00
2nd	BOS	Wayne Cashman	High-sticking	06:46	2:00
2nd	BOS	Wayne Cashman	Fighting – major	06:46	5:00
2nd	PHI	Ed Van Impe	High-sticking	06:46	2:00
2nd	PHI	Ed Van Impe	Fighting – major	06:46	5:00
2nd	PHI	Jimmy Watson	Game misconduct	06:46	10:00
2nd	BOS	Gregg Sheppard	Slashing	10:20	2:00
2nd	PHI	Bobby Clarke	Slashing	10:20	2:00
2nd	PHI	Andre Dupont	Hooking	16:31	2:00
3rd	BOS	Carol Vadnais	Hooking	11:07	2:00
3rd	PHI	Bobby Clarke	Slashing	11:07	2:00
3rd	PHI	Andre Dupont	Misconduct	19:38	10:00

Shots by period
Team	1	2	3	Total
Philadelphia	9	12	7	28
Boston	11	12	8	31

=== Game two ===
May 9	Philadelphia Flyers	3–2	OT	Boston Bruins	Boston Garden	Recap

Game two saw the Bruins on the verge of a 2–0 series lead when Flyers defenseman Andre Dupont scored with Parent pulled with less than a minute remaining for an extra attacker to tie the score at 2–2, and Bobby Clarke scored the 3–2 game winner in overtime. It was the first time the Flyers had beaten the Bruins in Boston Garden since the first ever meeting between the two franchises.

Scoring summary
Period	Team	Goal	Assist(s)	Time	Score
1st	BOS	Wayne Cashman (5)	Phil Esposito (11) and Carol Vadnais (11)	14:24	1–0 BOS
1st	BOS	Phil Esposito (8)	Ken Hodge (8) and Wayne Cashman (8)	17:22	2–0 BOS
2nd	PHI	Bobby Clarke (4)	Bill Flett (4) and Dave Schultz (3)	01:08	2–1 BOS
3rd	PHI	Andre Dupont (3)	Rick MacLeish (7) and Bobby Clarke (9)	19:08	2–2
OT	PHI	Bobby Clarke (5)	Bill Flett (5) and Dave Schultz (4)	12:01	3–2 PHI
Penalty summary
Period	Team	Player	Penalty	Time	PIM
1st	BOS	Andre Savard	Tripping	04:06	2:00
1st	BOS	Wayne Cashman	Elbowing	07:43	2:00
1st	BOS	Terry O'Reilly	Fighting – major	12:21	5:00
1st	PHI	Tom Bladon	Interference	12:21	2:00
1st	PHI	Dave Schultz (served by Simon Nolet)	Elbowing	12:21	2:00
1st	PHI	Dave Schultz	Fighting – major	12:21	5:00
2nd	PHI	Bernie Parent (served by Gary Dornhoefer)	Interference	10:49	2:00
2nd	BOS	Andre Savard	Elbowing	14:42	2:00
2nd	BOS	Andre Savard	Roughing	14:42	2:00
2nd	PHI	Orest Kindrachuk	Elbowing	14:42	2:00
2nd	PHI	Orest Kindrachuk	Roughing	14:42	2:00
2nd	BOS	Dallas Smith	Holding	18:13	2:00
2nd	BOS	Wayne Cashman	Game misconduct	20:00	10:00
2nd	BOS	Gilles Gilbert	Roughing	20:00	2:00
2nd	PHI	Orest Kindrachuk	Roughing	20:00	2:00
3rd	BOS	Andre Savard	Roughing	06:03	2:00
3rd	PHI	Don Saleski	Roughing	06:03	2:00
3rd	PHI	Jimmy Watson	Holding	10:30	2:00
3rd	BOS	Phil Esposito	Tripping	10:46	2:00
3rd	PHI	Jimmy Watson	Holding	14:01	2:00
OT	None				

Shots by period
Team	1	2	3	OT	Total
Philadelphia	12	5	7	6	30
Boston	10	14	8	7	39

=== Game three ===
May 12	Boston Bruins	1–4	Philadelphia Flyers	The Spectrum	Recap

In game three, the Flyers, led by Bernie Parent's play in goal, defeated Boston by a score of 4–1.

Scoring summary
Period	Team	Goal	Assist(s)	Time	Score
1st	BOS	Johnny Bucyk (8)	Gregg Sheppard (6) and Bobby Orr (12)	01:03	1–0 BOS
1st	PHI	Tom Bladon (4) – pp	Bobby Clarke (10) and Rick MacLeish (8)	10:27	1–1
1st	PHI	Terry Crisp (2)	Unassisted	15:43	2–1 PHI
2nd	None				
3rd	PHI	Orest Kindrachuk (5)	Don Saleski (6) and Bill Barber (6)	07:53	3–1 PHI
3rd	PHI	Ross Lonsberry (4)	Rick MacLeish (9)	14:19	4–1 PHI
Penalty summary
Period	Team	Player	Penalty	Time	PIM
1st	BOS	Carol Vadnais	Elbowing	03:52	2:00
1st	PHI	Tom Bladon	Elbowing	05:25	2:00
1st	PHI	Joe Watson	Tripping	07:33	2:00
1st	BOS	Wayne Cashman	Interference	09:17	2:00
1st	PHI	Andre Dupont	Interference	09:36	2:00
1st	BOS	Bobby Schmautz	Interference	10:03	2:00
1st	PHI	Ed Van Impe	Tripping	13:19	2:00
1st	PHI	Don Saleski	Holding	16:34	2:00
2nd	BOS	Bobby Orr	High-sticking	02:24	2:00
2nd	PHI	Bobby Clarke	High-sticking	02:24	2:00
2nd	BOS	Wayne Cashman	Interference	02:57	2:00
2nd	PHI	Tom Bladon	Hooking	03:43	2:00
2nd	PHI	Rick MacLeish	Hooking	08:50	2:00
2nd	BOS	Ken Hodge	Holding	09:35	2:00
2nd	PHI	Jimmy Watson	Holding	18:49	2:00
3rd	None				

Shots by period
Team	1	2	3	Total
Boston	11	6	8	25
Philadelphia	7	12	8	27

=== Game four ===
May 14	Boston Bruins	2–4	Philadelphia Flyers	The Spectrum	Recap

Bernie Parent would play well again in game four, stopping 28 shots to help Philadelphia win the game 4–2, and take a 3–1 series lead.

Scoring summary
Period	Team	Goal	Assist(s)	Time	Score
1st	PHI	Rick MacLeish (12) – pp	Tom Bladon (6)	04:40	1–0 PHI
1st	PHI	Dave Schultz (2)	Don Saleski (7) and Ed Van Impe (1)	05:30	2–0 PHI
1st	BOS	Phil Esposito (9) – pp	Johnny Bucyk (8) and Ken Hodge (9)	07:12	2–1 PHI
1st	BOS	Andre Savard (3)	Bobby Orr (13) and Carol Vadnais (12)	11:24	2–2
2nd	None				
3rd	PHI	Bill Barber (3)	Ross Lonsberry (9) and Jimmy Watson (2)	14:25	3–2 PHI
3rd	PHI	Andre Dupont (4)	Bobby Clarke (11) and Terry Crisp (2)	16:40	4–2 PHI
Penalty summary
Period	Team	Player	Penalty	Time	PIM
1st	BOS	Andre Savard	Fighting – major	02:43	5:00
1st	PHI	Orest Kindrachuk	Fighting – major	02:43	5:00
1st	BOS	Rich Leduc	Holding	03:21	2:00
1st	PHI	Joe Watson	Holding	06:09	2:00
1st	BOS	Wayne Cashman	High-sticking	06:17	2:00
1st	BOS	Wayne Cashman	Fighting – major	06:17	5:00
1st	PHI	Jimmy Watson	High-sticking	06:17	2:00
1st	PHI	Jimmy Watson	Fighting – major	06:17	5:00
1st	BOS	Terry O'Reilly	Fighting – major	07:56	5:00
1st	PHI	Dave Schultz	Fighting – major	07:56	2:00
1st	BOS	Phil Esposito	Slashing	09:43	2:00
1st	BOS	Dallas Smith	High-sticking	09:43	2:00
1st	PHI	Tom Bladon	Elbowing	09:43	2:00
1st	PHI	Don Saleski	Roughing	09:43	2:00
1st	BOS	Carol Vadnais	Cross-checking	13:03	2:00
1st	PHI	Bill Flett	Slashing	13:03	2:00
1st	BOS	Rich Leduc	Holding	13:16	2:00
1st	PHI	Bobby Clarke	Slashing	13:16	2:00
1st	BOS	Terry O'Reilly	Charging	16:10	2:00
1st	BOS	Andre Savard	Roughing	19:15	2:00
1st	PHI	Dave Schultz	Roughing	19:15	2:00
2nd	PHI	Rick MacLeish	Holding	06:19	2:00
2nd	BOS	Bobby Schmautz	Roughing	11:48	2:00
2nd	PHI	Joe Watson	Roughing	11:48	2:00
2nd	BOS	Phil Esposito	Roughing	19:26	2:00
2nd	PHI	Tom Bladon	Roughing	19:26	2:00
3rd	BOS	Don Marcotte	Roughing	06:16	2:00
3rd	PHI	Joe Watson	Roughing	06:16	2:00

Shots by period
Team	1	2	3	Total
Boston	11	8	11	30
Philadelphia	9	9	13	31

=== Game five ===
May 16	Philadelphia Flyers	1–5	Boston Bruins	Boston Garden	Recap

Game five in Boston was a sloppy affair marred by many fights and penalties as Boston easily won to extend the series to a game six in Philadelphia.

Scoring summary
Period	Team	Goal	Assist(s)	Time	Score
1st	BOS	Gregg Sheppard (11) – sh	Bobby Orr (14)	08:14	1–0 BOS
2nd	PHI	Bill Clement (1)	Bill Flett (6) and Ed Van Impe (2)	06:04	1–1
2nd	BOS	Bobby Orr (3)	Gregg Sheppard (7) and Johnny Bucyk (9)	12:06	2–1 BOS
2nd	BOS	Bobby Orr (4)	Gregg Sheppard (7) and Dallas Smith (9)	16:55	3–1 BOS
3rd	BOS	Ken Hodge (6) – pp	Gregg Sheppard (8) and Johnny Bucyk (10)	00:39	4–1 BOS
3rd	BOS	Don Marcotte (4)	Andre Savard (2) and Terry O'Reilly (5)	18:59	5–1 BOS
Penalty summary
Period	Team	Player	Penalty	Time	PIM
1st	BOS	Carol Vadnais	Fighting – major	00:24	5:00
1st	PHI	Dave Schultz	Fighting – major	00:24	5:00
1st	BOS	Bobby Schmautz	Cross-checking	00:45	2:00
1st	PHI	Tom Bladon	Holding	01:11	2:00
1st	BOS	Wayne Cashman	High-sticking	01:37	2:00
1st	PHI	Ed Van Impe	Roughing	01:37	5:00
1st	PHI	Andre Dupont	Elbowing	02:28	2:00
1st	PHI	Joe Watson	Tripping	04:00	2:00
1st	BOS	Bobby Orr	High-sticking	06:01	2:00
1st	BOS	Terry O'Reilly	Kneeing	07:58	2:00
1st	BOS	Terry O'Reilly	Fighting – major	07:58	5:00
1st	PHI	Andre Dupont	Fighting – major	07:58	5:00
1st	BOS	Andre Savard	Fighting – major	11:15	5:00
1st	PHI	Jimmy Watson	Fighting – major	11:15	5:00
1st	PHI	Andre Dupont	Holding	15:47	2:00
1st	PHI	Ross Lonsberry	Hooking	18:21	2:00
2nd	BOS	Wayne Cashman	Roughing	03:52	2:00
2nd	PHI	Bill Flett	Roughing	03:52	2:00
2nd	BOS	Phil Esposito	Roughing	05:00	2:00
2nd	PHI	Tom Bladon	Roughing	05:00	2:00
2nd	BOS	Phil Esposito	High-sticking	13:40	2:00
2nd	PHI	Jimmy Watson	High-sticking	13:40	2:00
2nd	PHI	Joe Watson	Holding	14:25	2:00
2nd	BOS	Wayne Cashman	Fighting – major	17:48	5:00
2nd	PHI	Dave Schultz	Fighting – major	17:48	5:00
2nd	PHI	Andre Dupont	Butt-ending	19:16	2:00
3rd	BOS	Wayne Cashman	Spearing	04:30	2:00
3rd	BOS	Carol Vadnais	High-sticking	04:37	2:00
3rd	PHI	Bobby Clarke	High-sticking	04:37	2:00
3rd	BOS	Darryl Edestrand	High-sticking	06:47	2:00
3rd	PHI	Terry Crisp	High-sticking	06:47	2:00
3rd	BOS	Dallas Smith	Slashing	07:02	2:00
3rd	BOS	Terry O'Reilly	Hooking	10:37	2:00
3rd	BOS	Bobby Schmautz	Roughing	13:58	2:00
3rd	BOS	Bobby Schmautz	Game misconduct	13:58	10:00
3rd	BOS	Carol Vadnais	Roughing	13:58	2:00
3rd	PHI	Dave Schultz	Roughing	13:58	2:00
3rd	PHI	Dave Schultz	Misconduct	13:58	10:00
3rd	PHI	Bobby Clarke	Cross-checking	14:47	2:00
3rd	BOS	Rich Leduc	Fighting – major	18:47	2:00
3rd	BOS	Carol Vadnais	Fighting – major	18:47	2:00
3rd	PHI	Tom Bladon	Fighting – major	18:47	2:00
3rd	PHI	Bruce Cowick	Fighting – major	18:47	2:00

Shots by period
Team	1	2	3	Total
Philadelphia	8	9	10	27
Boston	17	9	12	38

=== Game six ===
May 19	Boston Bruins	0–1	Philadelphia Flyers	The Spectrum	Recap

On May 19, before a national audience watching the game on NBC and a raucous Philadelphia crowd, Parent posted an epic 30-save shutout against the Bruins as the Flyers won the game 1–0 on a lone goal by former Bruin draft pick Rick MacLeish, the series four games to two, and the Stanley Cup. Parent made a spectacular kick save to stop a tremendous slapshot from Ken Hodge with less than three minutes left to play. The blast was the Bruins' final shot of the series. Parent was named the winner of the Conn Smythe Trophy as playoff MVP. The Flyers were the first of the 1967 expansion teams in the NHL to win the championship.

Coincidentally, the Flyers were the first team to clinch the Stanley Cup at home since the Bruins did so four years earlier on Orr's famous overtime goal vs. the St. Louis Blues in game four.

Scoring summary
Period	Team	Goal	Assist(s)	Time	Score
1st	PHI	Rick MacLeish (13) – pp	Andre Dupont (3)	14:48	1–0 PHI
2nd	None				
3rd	None				
Penalty summary
Period	Team	Player	Penalty	Time	PIM
1st	PHI	Andre Dupont	Interference	00:32	2:00
1st	BOS	Dave Forbes	Roughing	10:18	2:00
1st	PHI	Bill Clement	Roughing	10:18	2:00
1st	PHI	Bruce Cowick	Elbowing	10:18	2:00
1st	BOS	Terry O'Reilly	Hooking	13:58	2:00
1st	BOS	Bobby Orr	Roughing	14:22	2:00
1st	PHI	Bobby Clarke	Roughing	14:22	2:00
2nd	PHI	Andre Dupont	Tripping	00:40	2:00
2nd	BOS	Ken Hodge	Hooking	01:15	2:00
2nd	BOS	Al Sims	Cross-checking	05:44	2:00
2nd	PHI	Joe Watson	Holding	09:22	2:00
2nd	PHI	Joe Watson	Hooking	15:02	2:00
2nd	BOS	Carol Vadnais	Tripping	17:46	2:00
3rd	BOS	Terry O'Reilly	Hooking	08:12	2:00
3rd	PHI	Dave Schultz	Holding	11:15	2:00
3rd	BOS	Johnny Bucyk	Tripping	14:54	2:00
3rd	BOS	Bobby Orr	Holding	17:38	2:00

Shots by period
Team	1	2	3	Total
Boston	16	9	5	30
Philadelphia	8	14	4	26

== Aftermath ==
The Flyers Stanley Cup win triggered the largest celebration in Philadelphia sports history. Some observers of the celebration noted that they had seen that type of event in Philadelphia only once before, upon the announcement of the surrender of Japan on 14 August 1945. The day after the Flyers won the Cup, more than two million lined Broad Street for a ticker-tape parade, making it the largest championship parade in the history of Philadelphia sports. One of the fans who attended the parade was future New York Rangers goaltender Mike Richter. Richter grew up near Philadelphia in Flourtown, Pennsylvania idolizing Flyers goalie Bernie Parent.

The following year, the Flyers successfully returned to the Finals and captured their second consecutive Stanley Cup; this time, over the Buffalo Sabres in Buffalo, also winning in six games.

As for the Bruins, they lost in the first round to the Chicago Black Hawks 2–1.

The Stanley Cup was not won on home ice again until the Canadiens did so in 1979.

== Team rosters ==
=== Philadelphia Flyers ===
No.	Nat	Player	Pos	S/G	Age	Acquired	Birthplace
1	(Canada)	Bernie Parent	G	L	29	1973	Montreal, Quebec
2	(Canada)	Ed Van Impe	D	L	33	1967	Saskatoon, Saskatchewan
3	(Canada)	Tom Bladon	D	R	21	1972	Edmonton, Alberta
4	(Canada)	Barry Ashbee	D	R	34	1970	Weston, Ontario
6	(Canada)	Andre Dupont	D	L	24	1972	Trois-Rivières, Quebec
7	(Canada)	Bill Barber	LW	L	21	1972	Callander, Ontario
8	(Canada)	Dave Schultz	LW	L	24	1969	Waldheim, Saskatchewan
9	(Canada)	Bob Kelly	LW	L	23	1970	Oakville, Ontario
10	(Canada)	Bill Clement	C	L	23	1970	Buckingham, Quebec
11	(Canada)	Don Saleski	RW	R	24	1972	Moose Jaw, Saskatchewan
12	(Canada)	Gary Dornhoefer (A)	RW	R	31	1967	Kitchener, Ontario
14	(Canada)	Joe Watson (A)	D	L	30	1967	Smithers, British Columbia
15	(Canada)	Terry Crisp (A)	C	L	30	1973	Parry Sound, Ontario
16	(Canada)	Bobby Clarke (C)	C	L	24	1969	Flin Flon, Manitoba
17	(Canada)	Simon Nolet	RW	R	32	1967	St. Odilon, Quebec
18	(Canada)	Ross Lonsberry	LW	L	27	1972	Watson, Saskatchewan
19	(Canada)	Rick MacLeish	C	L	24	1971	Cannington, Ontario
20	(Canada)	Jim Watson	D	L	21	1972	Smithers, British Columbia
21	(Canada)	Bill Flett	RW	R	30	1972	Vermilion, Alberta
26	(Canada)	Orest Kindrachuk	C	L	23	1972	Nanton, Alberta
27	(Canada)	Bruce Cowick	LW	L	22	1973	Victoria, British Columbia
30	(Canada)	Bobby Taylor	G	R	29	1968	Calgary, Alberta

=== Boston Bruins ===
No.	Nat	Player	Pos	S/G	Age	Acquired	Birthplace
1	(Canada)	Gilles Gilbert	G	L	25	1973	Saint-Esprit, Quebec
4	(Canada)	Bobby Orr	D	L	26	1966	Parry Sound, Ontario
6	(Canada)	Darryl Edestrand	D	L	28	1973	Strathroy, Ontario
7	(Canada)	Phil Esposito	C	L	32	1967	Sault Ste. Marie, Ontario
8	(United Kingdom)	Ken Hodge	RW	R	29	1967	Birmingham, United Kingdom
9	(Canada)	Johnny Bucyk (C)	LW	L	39	1957	Edmonton, Alberta
10	(Canada)	Carol Vadnais	D	L	28	1972	Montreal, Quebec
11	(Canada)	Andre Savard	C	L	20	1973	Temiscamingue, Quebec
12	(Canada)	Wayne Cashman	RW	R	28	1964	Kingston, Ontario
14	(Canada)	Dave Forbes	LW	L	25	1973	Montreal, Quebec
17	(Canada)	Bobby Schmautz	RW	R	29	1974	Saskatoon, Saskatchewan
18	(Canada)	Rich Leduc	C	L	22	1971	Ile Perot, Quebec
19	(Canada)	Gregg Sheppard	LW	L	25	1972	North Battleford, Saskatchewan
20	(Canada)	Dallas Smith	D	L	32	1959	Hamiota, Manitoba
21	(Canada)	Don Marcotte	LW	L	27	1965	Arthabaska, Quebec
22	(Canada)	Doug Gibson	C	L	20	1973	Peterborough, Ontario
23	(Canada)	Al Sims	D	L	21	1973	Toronto, Ontario
24	(Canada)	Terry O'Reilly	RW	R	22	1971	Niagara Falls, Ontario
29	(Canada)	Al Simmons	D	L	23	1974	Winnipeg, Manitoba
30	(Canada)	Ross Brooks	G	L	36	1971	Toronto, Ontario

== Stanley Cup engraving ==
The 1974 Stanley Cup was presented to Flyers captain Bobby Clarke by NHL President Clarence Campbell following the Flyers 1–0 win over the Bruins in game six.

The following Flyers players and staff had their names engraved on the Stanley Cup

1973–74 Philadelphia Flyers

=== Players ===
Centers

Wingers

- 7 Bill Barber
- 8 Dave Schultz
- 9 Bob Kelly
- 11 Don Saleski
- 12 Gary Dornhoefer (A)
- 17 Simon Nolet
- 18 Ross Lonsberry
- 21 Bill Flett
- 27 Bruce Cowick

Defencemen

- 2 Ed Van Impe
- 3 Tom Bladon
- 4 Barry Ashbee
- 6 Andre Dupont
- 14 Joe Watson (A)
- 20 Jimmy Watson

Goaltenders

- 1 Bernie Parent
- 30 Bobby Taylor

=== Coaching and administrative staff ===
- Ed Snider (Chairman/Owner), Joe Scott (President)
- F. Eugene Dixon Jr. (Vice Chairman), Fred Shero (Head Coach)
- Keith Allen (Vice President/General Manager)
- Lou Scheinfield (Vice President), Mike Nykoluk (Asst. Coach)
- Frank Lewis (Trainer), Jim McKenzie (Asst. Trainer)

=== Stanley Cup engraving ===
- #27 Bruce Cowick (LW) did not play any regular-season games for the Flyers in 1973–74 but was an injury replacement for eight games in the Stanley Cup playoffs, thus becoming eligible to receive a Stanley Cup ring and have his name engraved on the Stanley Cup.
- #25 Al MacAdam played five regular-season games and one playoff game. Although he did receive a Stanley Cup ring, his name was not engraved on the Stanley Cup.
- Joe Kadlec, John Brogan (Directors of Public Relations) were included on Philadelphia's Stanley Cup winning pictures in 1974, 1975, but their names do not appear on the Stanley Cup.

== See also ==
- 1973–74 NHL season
- 1973–74 Boston Bruins season
- 1973–74 Philadelphia Flyers season

== Notes ==
Preceded by Montreal Canadiens; 1973	Philadelphia Flyers; Stanley Cup champions 1974	Succeeded by Philadelphia Flyers; 1975
