= Tom Bladon =

Canadian ice hockey player (born 1952)

- Born: December 29, 1952 (age 73) Edmonton, Alberta, Canada
- Height: 6 ft 1 in (185 cm)
- Weight: 195 lb (88 kg; 13 st 13 lb)
- Position: Defence
- Shot: Right
- Played for: NHL; Philadelphia Flyers; Pittsburgh Penguins; Edmonton Oilers; Winnipeg Jets; Detroit Red Wings; AHL; Adirondack Red Wings
- NHL draft: 23rd overall, 1972; Philadelphia Flyers
- Playing career: 1972–1981

Thomas George Bladon (born December 29, 1952) is a Canadian former professional ice hockey defenceman and businessman. He played nine seasons in the National Hockey League (NHL) for the Philadelphia Flyers, Pittsburgh Penguins, Edmonton Oilers, Winnipeg Jets and Detroit Red Wings. He won the Stanley Cup with the Flyers in 1974 and 1975.

== Early life ==
Bladon was born on December 29, 1952, in Edmonton, Alberta, Canada.

== Playing career ==
=== Amateur ===
While playing for the Edmonton Maple Leafs in the Alberta Junior Hockey League (AJHL), Bladon was indefinitely suspended after breaking the jaw of an opponent on October 22, 1968. In protest of the suspension, the Maple Leafs threatened to pull out of the AJHL entirely. After the Maple Leafs appealed the suspension, the Alberta Amateur Hockey Association agreed to reinstate Bladon. He scored in his return to the Maple Leafs lineup on December 17 against the Red Deer Rustlers. Bladon was transitioned from forward to defenceman in the 1969-70 AJHL season due to the death of team captain and defenceman Lorne Owens. Although he graduated high school in 1970, Bladon chose not to pursue higher education.

Bladon was one of four Maple Leafs players promoted to their parent club, the Edmonton Oil Kings of the Western Canada Junior Hockey League (WCJHL), for the 1970–71 season. Through his first 10 games as a defenceman for the Oil Kings, Bladon scored four goals and six assists. He was praised by the Oil Kings general manager for his slapshot and was predicted to go in the first round of the 1972 NHL amateur draft. Bladon finished the regular season with 55 points through 65 games and was drafted by the Philadelphia Flyers in the second round. He signed a three-year contract with the Flyers on June 23, 1972.

=== Professional ===
After impressing the Flyers coaching staff, Bladon was named to their opening night roster for the 1972–73 season. Flyers' head coach Fred Shero later said that Bladon was playing under more pressure than any other rookie because he was used in "every situation." By mid-February, Bladon ranked high among the NHL's rookie scoring leaders with eight goals and 23 assists. Despite going through a scoring drought, Bladon tied Rick Foley's franchise record for points by a defenseman in early March. He finished his rookie season with 11 goals and 42 points, surpassing Bobby Orr's NHL record for assists by a rookie defenseman. Following their 1974 Stanley Cup win, Bladon signed a long-term contract extension with the Flyers.

On December 11, 1977, Bladon became the first defenceman in NHL history to record eight points in a single game. He scored four goals and four assists in the Flyers' 11–1 win over the Cleveland Barons. His record stood for nearly a decade before being tied by Paul Coffey of the Edmonton Oilers in 1986.

Following the 1977–78 season, Bladon, Orest Kindrachuk, and Ross Lonsberry were traded to the Pittsburgh Penguins in exchange for their first-round selection in the 1978 NHL amateur draft. As a free agent in July 1980, Bladon was acquired by the Edmonton Oilers in exchange for future considerations. However, he refused to report to the Oilers minor league team after playing only four periods. After receiving a release from the team, Bladon earned a tryout with the Detroit Red Wings.

== Personal life ==
Following his retirement, Bladon bought a trophy store in Victoria, British Columbia. He also worked as head coach at the Island Pacific Hockey School For Girls. By 2007, Bladon and his wife Diane gained ownership of a Tim Hortons franchise in Calgary.

== Career statistics ==
			Regular season					Playoffs
Season	Team	League	GP	G	A	Pts	PIM	GP	G	A	Pts	PIM
1969–70	Edmonton Maple Leafs	AJHL	46	12	17	29	115	—	—	—	—	—
1970–71	Edmonton Oil Kings	WCHL	66	13	25	38	124	14	5	6	11	46
1971–72	Edmonton Oil Kings	WCHL	65	11	44	55	90	16	6	7	13	10
1972–73	Philadelphia Flyers	NHL	78	11	31	42	26	11	0	4	4	2
1973–74	Philadelphia Flyers	NHL	70	12	22	34	37	16	4	6	10	25
1974–75	Philadelphia Flyers	NHL	76	9	20	29	54	13	1	3	4	12
1975–76	Philadelphia Flyers	NHL	80	14	23	37	68	16	2	6	8	14
1976–77	Philadelphia Flyers	NHL	80	10	43	53	39	10	1	3	4	4
1977–78	Philadelphia Flyers	NHL	79	11	24	35	57	12	0	2	2	11
1978–79	Pittsburgh Penguins	NHL	78	4	23	27	64	7	0	4	4	2
1979–80	Pittsburgh Penguins	NHL	57	2	6	8	35	1	0	1	1	0
1980–81	Adirondack Red Wings	AHL	41	3	15	18	28	18	3	3	6	16
1980–81	Edmonton Oilers	NHL	1	0	0	0	0	—	—	—	—	—
1980–81	Winnipeg Jets	NHL	9	0	5	5	10	—	—	—	—	—
1980–81	Detroit Red Wings	NHL	2	0	0	0	2	—	—	—	—	—
NHL totals			610	73	197	270	392	86	8	29	37	70

== Awards and honours ==
Award	Year(s)
WCHL Second All-Star Team	1972
Stanley Cup champion	1974, 1975
NHL All-Star Game	1977, 1978
Calder Cup champion	1981
