= Joe Scott (businessman) =

American businessman

- Born: July 28, 1908; Philadelphia, Pennsylvania, U.S.
- Died: June 23, 2002 (aged 93); Meadowbrook, Pennsylvania
- Occupation: Businessman
- Known for: Founding partner in the Philadelphia Flyers, owner of beer distributor Scott & Grauer

Joseph Charles Scott (July 28, 1908 – June 23, 2002) was an American businessman and a founding partner of the NHL's Philadelphia Flyers. Philadelphia won two Stanley Cups with Scott as president in 1974 and 1975.
