= Ron Wicks =

Canadian ice hockey official (1939–2016)

Ronald "Ron" Wicks (September 22, 1939 – April 1, 2016) was a National Hockey League referee. His career started in 1960 and ended in 1986. During his career, he officiated five Stanley Cup finals and 1,400 regular season games. Wicks died of complications from liver cancer on April 1, 2016.

Wicks was born in Sudbury, Ontario and lived most of his life in Brampton, Ontario. Wicks was also director of officiating with the National Lacrosse League.

== Honours ==
- 2011 Brampton Sports Hall of Fame inductee
- Sudbury Sports Hall of Fame inductee
