= Bruce Cowick =

Canadian ice hockey player

- Born: August 18, 1951 (age 74) Victoria, British Columbia, Canada
- Height: 6 ft 1 in (185 cm)
- Weight: 200 lb (91 kg; 14 st 4 lb)
- Position: Left wing
- Shot: Left
- Played for: Philadelphia Flyers; Washington Capitals; St. Louis Blues
- NHL draft: Undrafted
- Playing career: 1971–1976

Robert Bruce Cowick (born August 18, 1951) is a Canadian former professional ice hockey forward. He played 70 games in the National Hockey League (NHL) with the Philadelphia Flyers, Washington Capitals and St. Louis Blues over three seasons from 1974 to 1975.

== Playing career ==
Cowick was born in Victoria, British Columbia. He began his career with the Philadelphia Flyers during the 1974 Stanley Cup playoffs, helping them win the Stanley Cup. He was left exposed for the 1974 NHL Expansion Draft and was claimed by the Washington Capitals. On October 17, 1974, the Capitals won their first game in NHL history, with Cowick picking up an assist. After playing a full season with the Capitals he was placed on waivers again and was claimed by the St. Louis Blues. He played five games with the Blues during the 1975–76 season and after finishing the season with the Providence Reds of the AHL, Cowick retired from professional hockey, and became a Esquimalt police officer.

== Career statistics ==
=== Regular season and playoffs ===
			Regular season					Playoffs
Season	Team	League	GP	G	A	Pts	PIM	GP	G	A	Pts	PIM
1968–69	Victoria Cougars	BCHL	—	—	—	—	—	—	—	—	—	—
1969–70	Victoria Cougars	BCHL	47	27	40	67	97	—	—	—	—	—
1970–71	Victoria Cougars	BCHL	47	31	44	75	197	—	—	—	—	—
1971–72	San Diego Gulls	WHL	65	6	8	14	97	4	0	2	2	2
1972–73	San Diego Gulls	WHL	61	17	13	30	165	—	—	—	—	—
1973–74	Richmond Robins	AHL	68	14	7	21	138	5	1	1	2	9
1973–74	Philadelphia Flyers	NHL	—	—	—	—	—	8	0	0	0	9
1974–75	Washington Capitals	NHL	65	5	6	11	41	—	—	—	—	—
1975–76	St. Louis Blues	NHL	5	0	0	0	2	—	—	—	—	—
1975–76	Providence Reds	AHL	38	3	6	9	38	1	0	0	0	0
NHL totals			70	5	6	11	43	8	0	0	0	9
