= Orest Kindrachuk =

Canadian ice hockey player

- Born: September 14, 1950 (age 75) Nanton, Alberta, Canada
- Height: 5 ft 10 in (178 cm)
- Weight: 175 lb (79 kg; 12 st 7 lb)
- Position: Centre
- Shot: Left
- Played for: Philadelphia Flyers; Pittsburgh Penguins; Washington Capitals
- NHL draft: Undrafted
- Playing career: 1971–1982

Orest Michael Kindrachuk (born September 14, 1950) is a Canadian-American former professional ice hockey centre who played ten seasons in the National Hockey League (NHL) for the Philadelphia Flyers, Pittsburgh Penguins, and Washington Capitals.

== Early life ==
Kindrachuk was born on September 14, 1950, in Nanton, Alberta, Canada to parents Natalie and Fred. He is of Ukrainian descent. After living in Alberta for one year, Kindrachuk's family moved to Saskatoon, Saskatchewan.

== Playing career ==
=== Amateur ===
Kindrachuk began playing ice hockey at the age of seven with the Victoria Campbell's in the Playgrounds Hockey League. He then spent two years in the Kinsmen Pee-Wee Hockey League before advancing to the midget level for another two seasons. While playing with the Black Hawks Pee Wee team, Kindrachuk won the 1965 Ray Dickson trophy as the league's best scorer. After playing a season of junior hockey, Kindrachuk joined the Saskatoon Blades of the Western Canada Junior Hockey League (WCJHL). While he had been offered scholarships to American post-secondary schools, he chose to remain in Saskatchewan to study ophthalmology.

As a rookie centreman for the Blades in the 1967–68 season, he scored 25 goals and 37 assists. His production dipped the following year due to an off-ice head injury. Even once he returned to the ice, Kindrachuk left numerous games mid-contest due to blackout issues. Despite undergoing clinical tests, no medical explanation could be given for these issues. Kindrachuk chose to forgo the majority of the 1969–70 season to focus on his studies at the University of Saskatchewan. When speaking of this choice, Blades general manager and head coach George Agar said: "he feels, that he has to give his course (optometry) a fair shake...and that means no hockey." Despite going undrafted in the 1969 NHL amateur draft, the NHL's Philadelphia Flyers placed Kindrachuk on their protected player list.

Kindrachuk returned to the Blades for the 1970–71 season as team captain and set numerous personal scoring milestones. After the team started the season with a losing record, Kindrachuk found success on a line with Laurie Yaworski and Dennis Abgrall. In their first eight games together, the team won five games and the trio combined for 67 points. Despite missing three games in January due to an injury, Kindrachuk maintained his league scoring lead. He scored four points on January 26, 1971, against the Medicine Hat Tigers to reach the 100-point plateau. Kindrachuk finished the regular season with 49 goals and 100 assists for 149 points, and was named team MVP.

=== Professional ===
Kindrachuk was not drafted and instead joined the San Diego Gulls after signing as a free agent by the Philadelphia Flyers in July 1971. He made his NHL debut in the 1972–73 season, and joined the Flyers full-time in the 1973–74 season.

Kindrachuk became an important part of the Flyers team as he helped them to win Stanley Cups as a rookie in 1974 as well as 1975. "Little O" Kindrachuk spent much of his time in Philadelphia centering Dave "The Hammer" Schultz and Don "Big Bird" Saleski on the team's third line. He played for the Flyers for six seasons.

Kindrachuk was traded to the Pittsburgh Penguins prior to the 1978–79 NHL season, where he played for three seasons as the team's captain. He signed with the Washington Capitals in 1981, but played only four games before he was forced to retire due to injuries.

== Personal life ==
Kindrachuk and his wife Lynn have two sons together. Following his retirement, Kindrachuk went into the insurance and packaging industry in the Philadelphia area. He also became a U.S. citizen. In 1999, Kindrachuk was inducted into the Saskatoon Sports Hall of Fame.

== Career statistics ==
=== Regular season and playoffs ===
			Regular season					Playoffs
Season	Team	League	GP	G	A	Pts	PIM	GP	G	A	Pts	PIM
1967–68	Saskatoon Blades	WCJHL	58	24	37	61	44	7	1	3	4	20
1968–69	Saskatoon Blades	WCHL	41	21	25	46	33	4	1	1	2	0
1969–70	Saskatoon Blades	WCHL	4	3	4	7	5	5	2	4	6	25
1970–71	Saskatoon Blades	WCHL	61	49	100	149	103	5	2	4	6	25
1971–72	San Diego Gulls	WHL	61	18	36	54	77	4	1	1	2	0
1972–73	Richmond Robins	AHL	72	35	51	86	133	3	0	1	1	10
1972–73	Philadelphia Flyers	NHL	2	0	0	0	0	—	—	—	—	—
1973–74	Philadelphia Flyers	NHL	71	11	30	41	85	17	5	4	9	17
1974–75	Philadelphia Flyers	NHL	60	10	21	31	72	14	0	2	2	12
1975–76	Philadelphia Flyers	NHL	76	26	49	75	101	16	4	7	11	4
1976–77	Philadelphia Flyers	NHL	78	15	36	51	79	10	2	1	3	0
1977–78	Philadelphia Flyers	NHL	73	17	45	62	128	12	5	5	10	13
1978–79	Pittsburgh Penguins	NHL	79	18	42	60	84	7	4	1	5	7
1979–80	Pittsburgh Penguins	NHL	52	17	29	46	63	—	—	—	—	—
1980–81	Pittsburgh Penguins	NHL	13	3	9	12	34	—	—	—	—	—
1981–82	Washington Capitals	NHL	4	1	0	1	2	—	—	—	—	—
NHL totals			508	118	261	379	648	76	20	20	40	53

Preceded by Jean Pronovost	Pittsburgh Penguins captain 1978–81	Succeeded by Randy Carlyle
