= Fred Shero =

Canadian former ice hockey player and coach (1925–1990)

- Hockey Hall of Fame, 2013 (Builder)
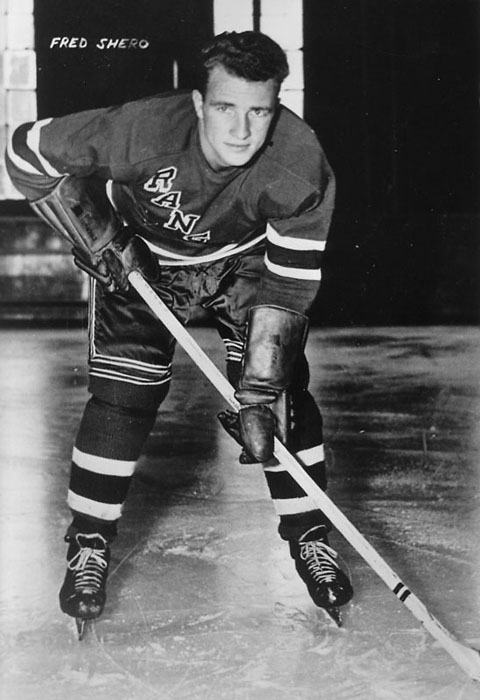
- Shero during his playing days with the Rangers
- Born: October 23, 1925 Winnipeg, Manitoba, Canada
- Died: November 24, 1990 (aged 65) Camden, New Jersey, U.S.
- Height: 5 ft 10 in (178 cm)
- Weight: 185 lb (84 kg; 13 st 3 lb)
- Position: Defence
- Shot: Left
- Played for: New York Rangers
- Coached for: Philadelphia Flyers; New York Rangers
- Playing career: 1947–1958
- Coaching career: 1958–1980

Frederick Alexander Shero (October 23, 1925 – November 24, 1990) was a Canadian professional ice hockey player, coach, and general manager. Nicknamed "The Fog", he played for the New York Rangers of the National Hockey League (NHL), but spent most of his playing career in the minor leagues. Following his playing career, Shero spent 13 years coaching in the minor leagues before making it to the NHL. As the head coach of the NHL's Philadelphia Flyers, Shero won the Stanley Cup in 1974 and 1975 and reached the Stanley Cup Final a third time, in 1976. He also had four consecutive seasons of having a 0.700 or better winning percentage and remains the Flyers all-time leader in coaching victories. Shero controversially left the Flyers following the 1977–78 season to become the head coach of the New York Rangers, whom he led to the Stanley Cup Final in his first season. He resigned from the Rangers after coaching for less than three seasons. Shero had a unique style of coaching that led to several innovations that are still used today. He was the first coach to hire a full-time assistant coach, employ systems, have his players use in season strength training, study film, and he was one of the first coaches to utilize a morning skate. In 2013 Shero was recognized for his contributions when he was elected to the Hockey Hall of Fame as a builder.

He was known for his enigmatic and introverted personality often appearing or disappearing from a room unnoticed, or being completely lost in thought. He often left philosophical sayings on a chalkboard as a way of provoking thought or as a motivational tool. Prior to game six of the 1974 Stanley Cup Final, Shero wrote his now famous quote "Win today and we walk together forever" – a statement that continues to be quoted to this day. His son, Ray Shero, also pursued a career in hockey, serving as general manager of the Pittsburgh Penguins (2006–2014) and New Jersey Devils (2015–2020).

== Early life ==
Fred Shero was born on October 23, 1925, in Winnipeg, Manitoba, Canada, to Russian-born parents who had fled to Canada after suffering religious persecution. He was often bullied for being the son of immigrants and went out of his way to avoid some of the other children in his neighbourhood. Shero credited his childhood experiences as a reason why he tended to be a loner. As a child Shero took up boxing and at age 13 he became a Canadian Bantamweight champion. His success gave him a chance to become a professional boxer, but he decided to play hockey instead. When he signed his first professional contract with the Rangers, his father cautioned him that "hockey players are looking for work when they are 30." When he left Winnipeg's Isaac Newton High School to go off to New York to play for the Rovers, he continued his education in his new surroundings.

== Playing career ==
At age 17, Shero was signed by the New York Rangers to a professional contract. He spent the first year of his contract in the minors, splitting time between the New York Rovers and the Brooklyn Crescents in the Eastern Amateur Hockey League. The following season, Shero served in the Royal Canadian Navy during World War II, although he continued to play hockey for the Navy as a member of HMCS Chippawa. Upon returning to the Rangers organization, Shero continued to play in the minors for another two seasons before reaching the National Hockey League (NHL). On October 16, 1947, he made his NHL debut at the Montreal Forum against the defending Stanley Cup Champion Montreal Canadiens in the 1947–48 season opener. However, he only played 19 games with the Rangers that year while splitting time with the St. Paul Saints in the United States Hockey League. It was during this time that he would first garner the nickname "The Fog". Although more often associated with his loner personality and propensity for being lost in thought, the nickname actually originated during a 1948 game in St. Paul, Minnesota: high humidity on indoor ice surfaces can result in fog, and one night in St. Paul, the fog was so thick that Shero was the only player who claimed to be able to see the puck, thus earning him the name "Freddy the Fog".

The 1948–49 season saw Shero become a regular in the Rangers lineup as well as his first NHL post-season action. The following season, Shero set career highs in games played, assists, and points, while the Rangers qualified for the post-season in the fourth and final position. Despite being the lowest seed, the Rangers made it to the Stanley Cup Final by upsetting the Montreal Canadiens in the first round. In the Finals, the Rangers faced the Detroit Red Wings, and on April 23, 1950, the Rangers lost game seven in double overtime. It was the last NHL game Shero ever played. On May 14, 1951, the Rangers traded Shero to the American Hockey League's (AHL) Cleveland Barons. Shero won back-to-back Calder Cups with the Barons in 1953 and 1954. Shero was also named an AHL Second Team All-Star in 1954. However, he only played one more season with the Barons before moving to the Western Hockey League (WHL) with the Winnipeg Warriors for the 1955–56 season. In his first season with the club, Shero captained the Warriors to the WHL championship. He played with the Warriors again during the 1956–57 season, but then moved to the Quebec Hockey League (QHL), playing for the Shawinigan Cataractes in 1957–58. During the 1957–58 QHL season, Shero began coaching, serving as a player and assistant coach for the Cataractes and helping them capture the QHL championship. He retired from playing in 1958.

== Coaching career ==
After retiring as a player, Shero continued to coach and began a 13-year coaching career in the minor leagues. During his time in the minors, Shero proved to be a winning coach accumulating six first-place finishes, five second-place finishes and twice finishing third in various leagues. He also coached the St. Paul Saints to the IHL championship, The Turner Cup, in 1960 and 1961. In 1964, he coached the St. Paul Rangers to the CPHL championship finals. The following season Shero began his AHL coaching career with the Buffalo Bisons whom he led to a Calder Cup Championship in 1970, while winning the Louis A. R. Pieri Memorial Award as AHL coach of the year. For the 1970–71 season Shero again changed teams this time coaching in the Central Hockey League with the Omaha Knights, winning the league Championship. Although in the Rangers farm system for several years and winning at various levels, Shero was never seriously considered to replace Emile Francis as head coach, due to Shero's perceived alcohol problem and a belief that he was an ineffective communicator.

=== Philadelphia Flyers (1971–1978) ===
In 1971 the Philadelphia Flyers were looking for a new coach, and general manager Keith Allen suggested Shero to owner Ed Snider. When asked if he knew Shero, Allen admitted to only knowing him by reputation. He knew Shero always had a winning record, plus he had a "gut feeling" he was the right man for the job. Snider agreed to bring in Shero because he trusted Allen's judgment. Thus Shero became the third coach in Flyers history; he had high hopes for the season, predicting that the Flyers would finish no worse than second in the West Division. The 1971–72 season was disappointing for Shero as the Flyers finished in 5th place in the West with a 26–38–14 record. The Flyers 66 points were actually a decrease of 7 points in the standings and they missed the playoffs for the second time in three years. Shero's "Fog" nickname was also re-established during the year following a game at the Omni Coliseum in Atlanta when he left the arena through a door with no re-entry and became locked outside prior to the post-game press conference. At the press conference no one knew where Shero was and reporters unsuccessfully searched the arena for him.

In the off-season Shero decided that the team would be more successful if he coached them like he had coached his minor league teams. Upon being elevated to the NHL, he had decided not to employ systems like he did in the minors, stating that he had too much respect for NHL players. However, he decided that since he had the same kind of players on the Flyers as he did in the minors, he would use the same systems, becoming the first coach to employ systems. Shero insisted on having a scout for talent in Europe, and the club employed Aggie Kukulowicz who had played in the NHL and spoke Russian and Polish.

In 1972–73 Shero hired Mike Nykoluk as an assistant coach on a one-year tryout basis. Although assistant coaches are common today, Nykoluk was the first full-time assistant coach in the league, and the decision to hire him led to rumors that Shero must not be much of a coach if he needed help. However, with the additional help Shero guided the Flyers to their first winning season in franchise history, and Nykoluk stayed on as assistant throughout Shero's tenure. Prior to a game during the 72–73 season Shero wrote a quote about commitment on the dressing room blackboard, and the team won the game. From then on Shero wrote inspirational quotes prior to games. After finishing second in the West Division they faced off with the Minnesota North Stars whom they defeated 4–2 winning the first playoff series in Flyers history. In the second round the Flyers matched up with the Montreal Canadiens, who defeated Philadelphia 4–1.

==== Stanley Cup years ====
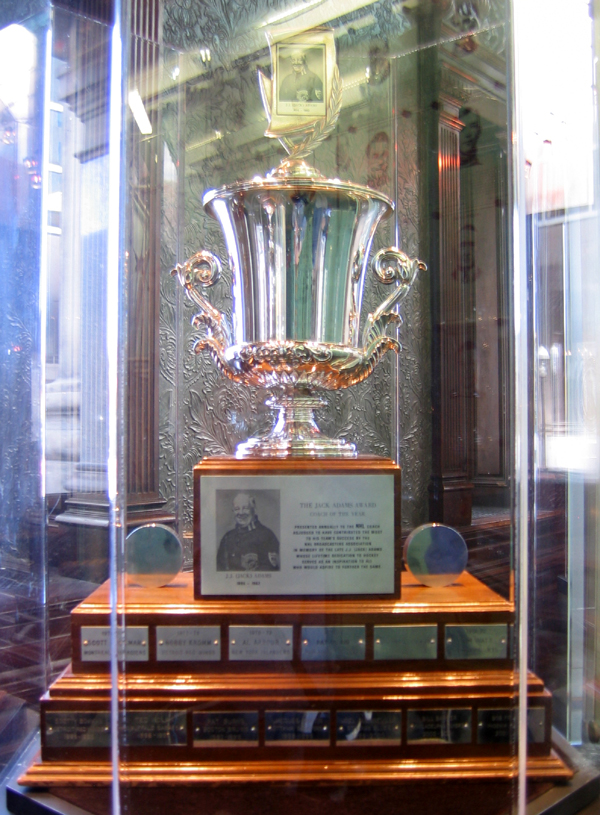
The Jack Adams Award for coach of the year, which Shero won in its inaugural season (1973–74)

The following season Shero led the Flyers to a 50–16–12 record, finishing in first place in the Western Division. The 112 point total also placed the Flyers just one point behind the Boston Bruins for first overall in the NHL. It also marked the first time in franchise history that the Flyers posted a winning percentage over .700. The division title and high winning percentage accompanied by a 27-point increase from the previous season led to Shero winning the inaugural Jack Adams Award for coach of the year. In the 1974 playoffs the Flyers' first round match-up was against the Atlanta Flames. Following a game three win in which the Flyers went up 3–0, Shero was involved in an infamous incident. Known for taking late night walks and stopping at local bars and pubs for a drink, Shero decided to go for one of those walks following the game three victory. Though no one knows for sure what happened, Shero was allegedly mugged. Shero didn't divulge any information about what really happened but police responded to a disturbance call at 2 a.m. outside the Flyers hotel. Shero was found with a broken thumb and cuts and bruises to his face. Flyers' management sent him home to recuperate and assistant coach Nykoluk coached the team in the series winning game. In the Semi-final round the Flyers were considered underdogs to the New York Rangers. However, the Flyers had home ice advantage. In the seven game series the home team won every game, giving the Flyers a 4–3 series win. It marked the first time an expansion team defeated an Original Six team in a playoff series. The Flyers advanced to the Stanley Cup Final where they played the Boston Bruins. Prior to game one Shero devised an unconventional game plan. The Flyers were to dump the puck to Bobby Orr's side of the rink. Orr was considered to be one of the league's best players, and the plan was to make him skate hard back to get the puck. In addition the team was to be physically hard on him. Any player who had the opportunity was to check, bump or put a stick on Orr, in an attempt to wear him down. Bobby Clarke later recalled that the strategy did work although it did take some time. Clarke stated that Orr was the best player on the ice in game five, but in game six Orr wasn't the factor he had been in other games. Going into game six, the Flyers had a chance to win the Stanley Cup. Prior to the game Shero wrote his famous quote "Win today, and we walk together forever" on the dressing room blackboard for inspiration to the players. The quote is still used today. The Flyers went on to win game six and the series, thus becoming the first expansion team to win the Stanley Cup. Following the series Flyers' goaltender Bernie Parent was named Conn Smythe as playoff MVP. During the official presentation Parent was given a new car, which he promptly gave to Shero.

In the 1974–75 season, Shero led the Flyers to a 51–18–11 record. They won the newly formed Patrick Division, were first in the new Campbell Conference, and first overall in the NHL. In their opening series the Flyers swept the Toronto Maple Leafs, setting up a semi-final match-up against the New York Islanders. After taking a 3–0 series led, the Flyers lost three straight to set up a deciding seventh game. Before game seven, Shero wrote a quote by Dag Hammarskjöld – "Only he deserves power who every day justifies it." on the blackboard. Though Shero never admitted it, the quote was believed to be directed at centre Rick MacLeish who had underperformed in the series. MacLeish responded and in game seven he registered a hat-trick as the Flyers won the game 4–1. The win set up a Stanley Cup Final match-up with Buffalo. Shero and the coaching staff again devised a game plan. This time it was to stop Buffalo's French Connection line. The first part of the plan was to keep Sabre's centre Gilbert Perreault out of the middle of the rink and to take away his passing options. The Flyers' centres were instructed to play close to Perreault and be physical against him, to the point where it bordered on a penalty. The second part involved wearing down the French Connection. Shero made numerous line changes to keep fresh players out against the Sabre's trio. A perfect example of this part of the strategy was in game one. The French Connection took a 97-second shift and the Flyers made three line changes during that time. Shero's strategy worked, and the Flyers won their second consecutive Stanley Cup.

In 1975–76 Shero guided the Flyers to a 51–13–16 record highlighted by a 36–2–2 home ice record. Again they won the Patrick division and finished first overall in the Campbell Conference. The season saw the club set franchise records in points and winning percentage. The season also witnessed an exhibition game, that would become one of the most famous games in Flyers history. In 1976 the Soviet Red Army team toured North America and played four games against NHL clubs. On January 11, 1976, the Russians matched up against the Flyers at the Spectrum in Philadelphia. Entering the game the Red Army team was unbeaten, defeating both Boston and the Rangers and registering a tie against the Canadiens. Shero had studied the Soviet style of play, even traveling to the Soviet Union during different off-seasons. Shero even implemented some of the Russian style into his own system, altering it slightly. With his knowledge of the Russian system, Shero devised a game plan. The Russian system involved making several passes often to where a player had just moved from. Shero instructed the Flyers' players not to chase the puck, but rather hold their positions. While in the offensive zone the Flyer forwards were to hold the puck as much as possible to avoid counter-attacks. The Flyers won the game by a final of 4–1 and outshot the Red Army 49–13. The victory led some to see the Flyers as the best team in the world. Following the playoffs that distinction would not last. Bernie Parent had suffered a back injury that limited him to eleven regular season games; he was able to return for the first-round series win versus Toronto. But the pain became too much for Parent to continue to play in subsequent series, and Shero was forced to use his back-up goaltender, Wayne Stephenson. The Flyers were also without second-line centre MacLeish, resulting in a depletion of scoring depth. Despite these setbacks Shero led Philadelphia past Boston in the semi-finals and back to the Stanley Cup Final. However, the Flyers fell short of winning three straight cups, losing to Montreal in four consecutive games.

In the 1976–77 season the Flyers' win total slipped from 51 to 48, but they still managed a .700 winning percentage. This marked the fourth consecutive year of having a .700 or better win percentage – once again winning their division and finishing first in the Campbell Conference. In the post season the Flyers again reached the semi-finals, but lost to the Bruins in four straight games. The following season the Flyers' record fell to 45–20–15 finishing second to the Islanders in both the division and the Conference. Shero again led the Flyers to the semi-finals, where they lost to the Bruins once more. At the end of the season Shero, who had one more year left on his contract, submitted a letter of resignation stating that the Flyers needed a change whether they realized it or not. Flyers management had previously heard rumors about Shero wanting to leave Philadelphia and re-join the Rangers organization, and refused to accept his letter of resignation. Shero then signed a $250,000 per year, five-year contract with the Rangers to be their new Head Coach and General Manager, believing he no longer had a contractual agreement to the Flyers. A few weeks after signing Shero, the Rangers gave the Flyers their first-round pick in the 1978 draft (Ken Linseman) and cash as compensation, allowing the Rangers to avoid tampering charges.

=== New York Rangers and beyond ===
In his first season with the Rangers, Shero led them to a 40–29–11 record – an increase of ten wins over the previous season. The Rangers excelled during the playoffs that year, defeating the Los Angeles Kings in their first round match-up, then knocking off Shero's former club Philadelphia. In the semi-finals the Rangers upset their cross town rival Islanders to reach the Stanley Cup Final for the first time since 1972. The Rangers matched up against the Montreal Canadiens in the Final. After upsetting Montreal in game one of the finals, Phil Esposito asked Shero to get the team out of town prior to game two, two nights later. Shero decided against such a move and several Rangers' players were rumored to have "partied hard" following the win. The Rangers took a 2–0 lead in game two before losing the game and eventually the series, 4–1. In the 1979–80 season the Rangers record dipped to 38–32–10, good for fourth place in the Campbell conference. In the playoffs the Rangers defeated the Flames in round one, but lost a playoff rematch to the Flyers, 4–1, in round two. After the season Shero was honored with the Lester Patrick Trophy for his contributions to the growth of hockey in the United States, an award he shared with the "Miracle on Ice" 1980 U.S. Olympic ice hockey Team. The next season the Rangers suffered injuries to key players resulting in a 4–13–3 start. Shero decided to step down from both his positions and was replaced by Craig Patrick.

In 1982, Shero failed in an attempt to become the Detroit Red Wings head coach. A year later he was diagnosed with stomach cancer. He underwent surgery but remained healthy enough to start his new position as color analyst for the New Jersey Devils radio broadcasts. In 1987, Shero decided he wanted to experience coaching in Europe and spent one season coaching the Tilburg Trappers in the Netherlands. He was recommended for the position in Tilburg by Lou Vairo, who had been an assistant coach with the New Jersey Devils.

With his health declining Shero returned to the Flyers' organization as a special assistant in 1989. The reunion was to help him with his medical costs, but it was also something that was very important to Shero on a personal level, as it was a return to the organization he had the most success with. On March 22, 1990, Shero was elected into the Flyers' Hall of Fame. Eight months later on November 24, Shero died at Cooper Hospital in Camden, New Jersey. He was 65.

Shero's passing did not diminish his popularity in Philadelphia and in a 1999 Philadelphia Daily News poll, he was selected as the city's greatest professional coach/manager, beating out other notable coaches such as: Connie Mack of MLB Philadelphia Athletics, Dick Vermeil, and Greasy Neale of the NFL Philadelphia Eagles. In 2010 there was a push to get him elected into the Hockey Hall of Fame, which included an online petition at Flyershistory.net. Shero was eventually elected to the Hockey Hall of Fame as a builder in 2013. He remains the winningest coach in Flyers history with 308 wins, plus 48 more in playoff competition.

== Coaching style ==
Shero's introverted, enigmatic personality had an effect on the way in which he coached players. Shero often communicated with his players by way of notes left in their lockers. When he did talk to them, he was known for never yelling. He believed that when coaches yell they do it for their own sake. He always defended his player whether it was in the press or even against management. He always tried to make sure his players were focused during the game. He often asked them how much time was left in the period to force them to pay attention. He had a unique take on practice as well. If the team was winning then he worked the team hard. If they were losing then there would be a low key practice. He believed that he could get more out of players when they were winning. He often had drills designed to let the players have fun, stating that "Hockey is a child's game played by men. Since it's a child's game it ought to be fun". To have fun the Flyers occasionally had 12-on-12 games with the winning team earning a small monetary reward. He sometimes had the players perform drills that lacked purpose which the team performed until a player questioned the validity of the drill. At that point Shero stopped the drill and praised the player for being alert. Shero was notoriously bad with names. On one occasion it led to him trading for the wrong player. While GM of the Rangers Shero traded for Cam Connor believing it was Colin Campbell. Upon his arrival Connor had to explain that he was a winger and not a defenceman.

Often credited with using fighting and intimidation as a tactic, Shero never coached players to fight. He valued team toughness and insisted that players take the body and follow through with their checks. When it came to fighting Shero was quoted as saying "I swear I have never told a player to attack another player. In fact, I have told my players if they ever hear me saying something like this, they can break a stick over my skull. I ask only that they play aggressively." In an interview in the HBO documentary Broad Street Bullies Shero states that he had a team that liked fighting so he let them fight. Demonstrating his personal coaching philosophy that "You have to learn to win with what you got or you don't win at all." However, according to Börje Salming, he was once approached by former Flyers captain Bobby Clarke who admitted that Fred Shero had instructed the team to "Get him (Börje) off the ice by any means necessary".

Shero was an innovator, aside from being the first coach to employ systems, and known as one of the first Western coaches to study Soviet influences, he was the first coach to study film. His son Ray even recalls his father breaking down games from radio broadcasts. He was also the first to have his players use in season strength training, with the use of an Apollo machine, a precursor to Nautilus equipment, as well as one of the first coaches to adopt the morning skate. He was one of the first coaches to have a game plan specifically designed on how to attack opposing teams, although not all of them worked to plan. Bernie Parent recalls a game against Montreal in which Shero decided to outskate the highly skilled Canadiens. After the first period, during which the Flyers' goaltender faced 21 shots, he jokingly summed it up by saying, "the Zamboni didn't even need to resurface the other end of the ice." Yet it illustrates Shero's understanding that he didn't know everything about coaching and his pursuit to learn more.

== Personal life ==
In 1957, Shero was introduced to his future wife, Mariette, by his teammate Eddie Johnston in Shawinigan Falls, Quebec. Mariette was the sister of a woman Johnston was dating at the time. Johnston recalled that Shero told him that he was going to marry Mariette after their first date, which he did shortly thereafter. Fred and Mariette had two sons, Rejean (Ray) and Jean-Paul. Ray also pursued a career in hockey, serving as general manager of the Pittsburgh Penguins (2006–2014) and New Jersey Devils (2015–2020).

Fascinated by the law, Shero contemplated retiring from coaching to attend law school following the Flyers Stanley Cup victory, believing he had nothing left to prove in hockey. Although he remained in coaching he did take a correspondence course in law. Known to spend time at his local library, Shero enjoyed the works of William Shakespeare and Charles Dickens and prided himself for being "the very first New York Ranger ever to hold a New York Public Library card." Among other interests was playing the violin.

== Awards and achievements ==
- EAHL First All-Star Team (1947)
- Calder Cup (AHL) Championships (1953, 1954, and 1970)
- AHL Second All-Star Team (1954)
- WHL Championship (1956)
- Turner Cup (IHL) Championships (1960, 1961)
- Louis A. R. Pieri Memorial Award for AHL Coach of the Year (1970)
- CHL championship (1971)
- Stanley Cup championships (1974 and 1975)
- Jack Adams Award for NHL coach of the year (1974)
- Lester Patrick Trophy winner (1980)
- Inducted to the Manitoba Hockey Hall of Fame in 1985
- Inducted to the Flyers Hall of Fame in 1990
- Inducted to the Manitoba Sports Hall of Fame and Museum in 1999
- Inducted to the Philadelphia Sports Hall of Fame in 2008
- Inducted to the Hockey Hall of Fame in 2013

== Career statistics ==
=== Regular season and playoffs ===
			Regular season					Playoffs
Season	Team	League	GP	G	A	Pts	PIM	GP	G	A	Pts	PIM
1941–42	St. James Canadians	MJHL	—	—	—	—	—	—	—	—	—	—
1942–43	St. James Monarchs	MJHL	16	3	3	6	2	4	1	1	2	2
1943–44	New York Rovers	EAHL	15	5	7	12	6	—	—	—	—	—
1943–44	Brooklyn Crescents	EAHL	29	11	14	25	7	10	2	5	7	8
1944–45	Port Arthur Navy	TBJHL	1	0	0	0	2	—	—	—	—	—
1944–45	Winnipeg Rangers	MJHL	2	0	5	5	0	3	1	1	2	8
1944–45	Winnipeg HMCS Chippewas	WNDHL	15	5	8	13	16	6	2	2	4	4
1945–46	New York Rovers	EAHL	30	10	15	25	20	12	2	5	7	8
1946–47	New Haven Ramblers	AHL	3	0	0	0	6	—	—	—	—	—
1946–47	New York Rovers	EAHL	46	9	22	31	44	9	1	3	4	25
1947–48	New York Rangers	NHL	19	1	0	1	2	6	0	1	1	6
1947–48	St. Paul Saints	USHL	40	9	14	23	20	—	—	—	—	—
1948–49	New York Rangers	NHL	59	3	6	9	64	—	—	—	—	—
1949–50	New York Rangers	NHL	67	2	8	10	71	7	0	1	1	2
1949–50	New Haven Ramblers	AHL	2	1	0	1	0	—	—	—	—	—
1950–51	Cincinnati Mohawks	AHL	65	5	17	22	94	—	—	—	—	—
1951–52	Cleveland Barons	AHL	15	2	2	4	10	3	0	1	1	2
1951–52	Seattle Ironmen	PCHL	43	1	16	17	46	—	—	—	—	—
1952–53	Cleveland Barons	AHL	64	4	14	18	54	9	2	1	3	16
1953–54	Cleveland Barons	AHL	69	21	32	53	95	9	2	3	5	16
1954–55	Cleveland Barons	AHL	37	8	14	22	54	—	—	—	—	—
1955–56	Winnipeg Warriors	WHL	59	8	24	32	99	6	0	2	2	8
1956–57	Winnipeg Warriors	WHL	66	8	24	32	52	—	—	—	—	—
1957–58	Shawinigan Falls Cataractes	QSHL	48	1	5	6	50	4	0	1	1	10
AHL totals			255	41	79	120	313	21	4	5	9	34
NHL totals			145	6	14	20	137	13	0	2	2	8

=== NHL coaching record ===
Team	Year	Regular season						Postseason			
Team	Year	G	W	L	T	Pts	Finish	W	L	Win%	Result
PHI	1971–72	78	26	38	14	66	5th in West	—	—	—	Missed playoffs
PHI	1972–73	78	37	30	11	85	2nd in West	5	6	.455	Lost in Semifinals (MTL)
PHI	1973–74	78	50	16	12	112	1st in West	12	5	.706	Won Stanley Cup (BOS)
PHI	1974–75	80	51	18	11	113	1st in Patrick Division	12	5	.706	Won Stanley Cup (BUF)
PHI	1975–76	80	51	13	16	118	1st in Patrick Division	8	8	.500	Lost in Stanley Cup Final (MTL)
PHI	1976–77	80	48	16	16	110	1st in Patrick Division	4	6	.400	Lost in Semifinals (BOS)
PHI	1977–78	80	45	20	15	100	2nd in Patrick Division	6	5	.545	Lost in Semifinals (BOS)
PHI total		554	308	151	95	—	—	47	35	.573	6 playoff appearances 2 Stanley Cup titles
NYR	1978–79	80	40	29	11	91	3rd in Patrick Division	11	7	.611	Lost in Stanley Cup Final (MTL)
NYR	1979–80	80	38	32	10	86	3rd in Patrick Division	4	5	.444	Lost in Quarterfinals (PHI)
NYR	1980–81	20	4	13	3	11	Resigned	—	—	—	—
NYR total		180	82	74	24	—	—	15	12	.556	2 playoff appearances
NHL total		734	390	225	119	—	—	62	47	.569	8 playoff appearances 2 Stanley Cup titles

== See also ==
- Notable families in the NHL

Preceded by Vic Stasiuk	Head coach of the Philadelphia Flyers; 1971–78	Succeeded by Bob McCammon
Preceded by New Award	Winner of the Jack Adams Award; 1974	Succeeded by Bob Pulford
Preceded by Jean-Guy Talbot	Head coach of the New York Rangers; 1978–81	Succeeded by Craig Patrick
Preceded by John Ferguson, Sr.	General Manager of the New York Rangers; 1978–80	Succeeded by Craig Patrick
