= Joe Watson (ice hockey) =

Canadian ice hockey player

- Born: July 6, 1943 (age 82) Smithers, British Columbia, Canada
- Height: 5 ft 10 in (178 cm)
- Weight: 165 lb (75 kg; 11 st 11 lb)
- Position: Defence
- Shot: Left
- Played for: Boston Bruins; Philadelphia Flyers; Colorado Rockies
- Playing career: 1963–1979

Joseph John Watson (born July 6, 1943) is a Canadian former professional ice hockey defenceman who played for the Boston Bruins, Philadelphia Flyers, and Colorado Rockies during his National Hockey League (NHL) career. With the Flyers, he played with his younger brother Jimmy for several seasons, and was a member of the Flyers' back-to-back Stanley Cup championship teams. In the infamous 1976 game against the Soviet Red Army team, Watson, a defenceman and not a big scorer, scored a shorthanded goal against the great Vladislav Tretiak, causing Flyers coach Fred Shero to joke that Watson had "set Russian hockey back 25 years".

== Career statistics ==
=== Regular season and playoffs ===
			Regular season					Playoffs
Season	Team	League	GP	G	A	Pts	PIM	GP	G	A	Pts	PIM
1961–62	Estevan Bruins	SJHL	49	6	10	16	22	10	1	3	4	4
1962–63	Estevan Bruins	SJHL	53	5	24	29	74	11	2	10	12	14
1962–63	Estevan Bruins	MC	—	—	—	—	—	6	0	2	2	2
1963–64	Minneapolis Bruins	CPHL	71	0	20	20	55	5	0	0	0	2
1964–65	Boston Bruins	NHL	4	0	1	1	0	—	—	—	—	—
1964–65	Minneapolis Bruins	CPHL	65	3	23	26	38	5	0	1	1	2
1965–66	Oklahoma City Blazers	CPHL	69	8	24	32	58	9	1	3	4	6
1966–67	Boston Bruins	NHL	69	2	13	15	38	—	—	—	—	—
1967–68	Philadelphia Flyers	NHL	73	5	14	19	56	7	1	1	2	28
1968–69	Philadelphia Flyers	NHL	60	2	8	10	14	4	0	0	0	0
1969–70	Philadelphia Flyers	NHL	54	3	11	14	28	—	—	—	—	—
1970–71	Philadelphia Flyers	NHL	57	3	7	10	50	1	0	0	0	0
1971–72	Philadelphia Flyers	NHL	65	3	7	10	38	—	—	—	—	—
1972–73	Philadelphia Flyers	NHL	63	2	24	26	46	11	0	2	2	12
1973–74	Philadelphia Flyers	NHL	74	1	17	18	34	17	1	4	5	24
1974–75	Philadelphia Flyers	NHL	80	6	17	23	42	17	0	4	4	6
1975–76	Philadelphia Flyers	NHL	78	2	22	24	28	16	1	1	2	10
1976–77	Philadelphia Flyers	NHL	77	4	26	30	39	10	0	0	0	2
1977–78	Philadelphia Flyers	NHL	65	5	9	14	22	1	0	0	0	0
1978–79	Colorado Rockies	NHL	16	0	2	2	12	—	—	—	—	—
NHL totals			835	38	178	216	447	84	3	12	15	82
