= Dave Schultz (ice hockey) =

Canadian professional ice hockey player

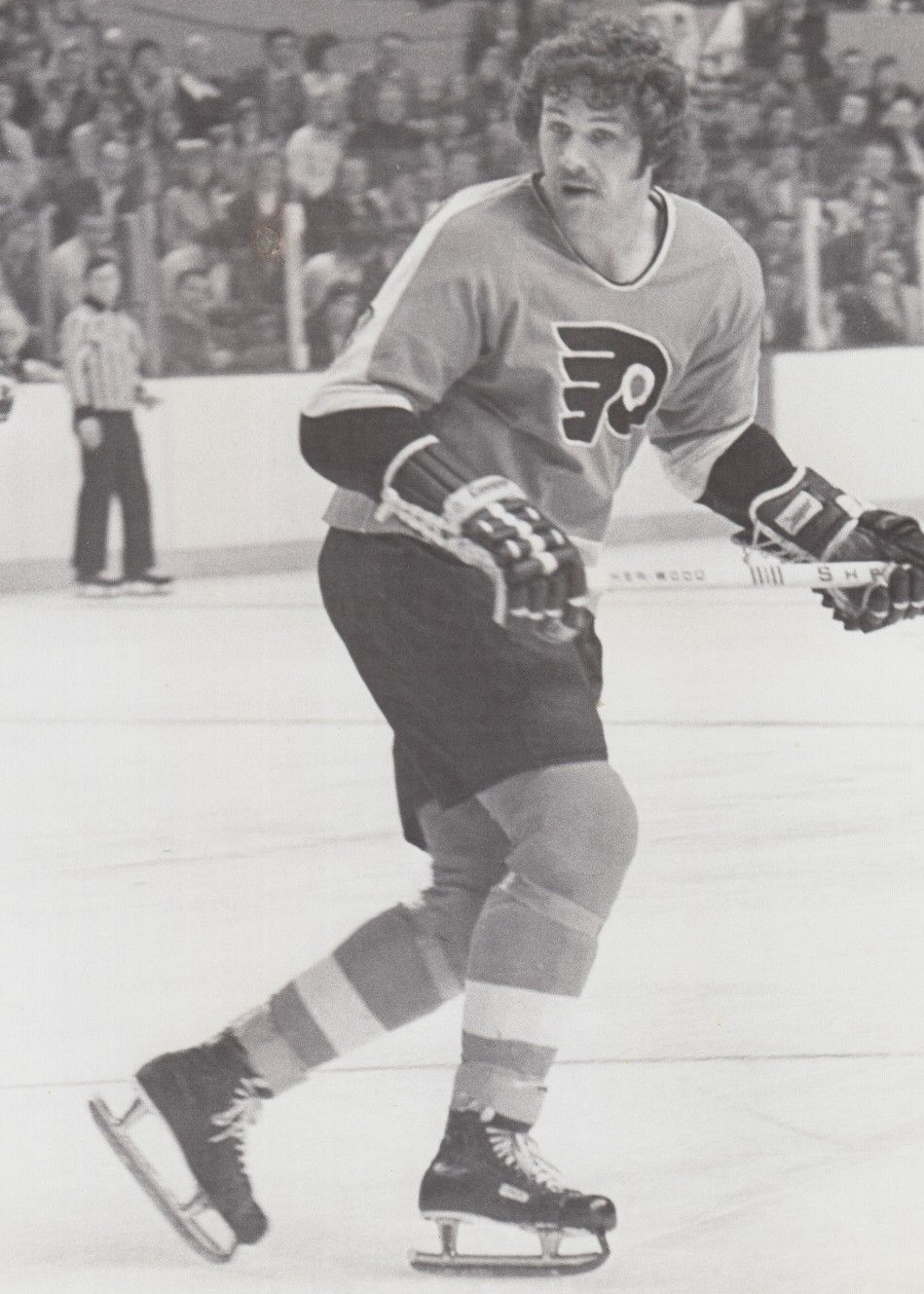
- Schultz with the Philadelphia Flyers in the 1970s
- Born: October 14, 1949 (age 77) Waldheim, Saskatchewan, Canada
- Height: 6 ft 1 in (185 cm)
- Weight: 185 lb (84 kg; 13 st 3 lb)
- Position: Left wing
- Shot: Left
- Played for: NHL; Philadelphia Flyers; Pittsburgh Penguins; Los Angeles Kings; Buffalo Sabres; AHL; Quebec Aces; Richmond Robins; Rochester Americans; EHL; Salem Rebels
- NHL draft: 52nd overall, 1969; Philadelphia Flyers
- Playing career: 1969–1980
- Coaching career: 1985–2005

David William Schultz (born October 14, 1949) is a Canadian businessman and former professional ice hockey coach and player. As a player, he was a two-time Stanley Cup winner with the Philadelphia Flyers.

Nicknamed "the Hammer", Schultz is renowned as one of hockey's best enforcers and holds the National Hockey League (NHL) record for most penalty minutes in a single season, at 472, and previously held the most career penalty minutes with 2,294, until he was surpassed by Tiger Williams in 1982. Schultz was born in Waldheim, Saskatchewan, but grew up in Rosetown, Saskatchewan.

== Playing career ==
Schultz was known as a point producer in junior hockey, but became an enforcer in his first year of pro hockey with the Richmond Robins of the AHL, prior to joining the Philadelphia Flyers, where he would become famous.

Schultz earned the nickname "the Hammer" for his aggressive style of hockey. He was one of the most notable enforcers on the Philadelphia Flyers' famous "Broad Street Bullies". After winning two Stanley Cups with the Flyers (1973–74 and 1974–75), "the Hammer" drifted through several teams (Pittsburgh Penguins, Los Angeles Kings and Buffalo Sabres) in search of a permanent position. When GMs tried to find some "muscle" for their fledgling clubs, they thought of him. Schultz was also able to capitalize on his popularity as a player when he recorded a local Philadelphia hit song called "The Penalty Box" in the mid 1970s.

Schultz could be more than an enforcer; he scored 20 goals for Philadelphia in 1973–74. He also scored the series-winning goal in overtime in the first round of the 1974 Stanley Cup playoffs against the Atlanta Flames. Despite his successes, Schultz later expressed regret about his role as an enforcer and the prominence of fighting in hockey.

After injuring his wrist in a fight, Schultz once put boxing wraps on his hands for protection. As things usually went, Schultz had several fights in ensuing games, while wearing the wraps. However, soon after, enforcers in both the National Hockey League and World Hockey Association started wearing similar hand protection. This was not to protect an already injured hand/wrist, but to protect themselves from injury in a fight. Soon after this trick became popular, both the WHA and NHL passed what became known as the "Schultz Rule", ending the boxing wraps' temporary involvement in professional ice hockey.

== Post-playing career ==
After retiring as a player, Schultz co-authored a book entitled The Hammer with Stan Fischler that provides insights into the world of a professional ice hockey enforcer. He also served as commissioner of the Atlantic Coast Hockey League (ACHL) during the 1982–83 season.

Schultz went on to coach several minor league teams over the next two decades. He began his coaching career during the 1985–86 season serving the head coach-general manager of the New York Slapshots of the ACHL, but Schultz relinquished his head coaching duties in the middle of the season when the team unexpectedly moved to Virginia so he could remain with his family in South Jersey. Other teams that Schultz went on to coach included the Madison Monsters, Baton Rouge Kingfish, Mohawk Valley Prowlers, and Elmira Jackals.

In 1994, he served as referee at WCW Slamboree for the match between The Nasty Boys against Cactus Jack & Kevin Sullivan.

In 2022, he voiced himself in The Simpsons episode "Top Goon".

On October 21, 2025, Schultz released his memoirs titled Hammered: The Fight of My Life, written with Dan Robson.

== Awards ==
- 1974 - Stanley Cup Philadelphia Flyers
- 1975 - Stanley Cup Philadelphia Flyers
- Inducted into Flyers Hall of Fame on November 16, 2009

== Records ==
- Most penalty minutes in a season: 472 (1974–75)
- Only player with multiple seasons of 400 penalty minutes (1974–75, 1977–78)

== Career statistics ==
=== Playing career ===
Bold indicates led league
Bold italics indicate NHL record

			Regular season					Playoffs
Season	Team	League	GP	G	A	Pts	PIM	GP	G	A	Pts	PIM
1966–67	Swift Current Broncos	Exhib.	26	19	13	32	—	—	—	—	—	—
1967–68	Swift Current Broncos	WCHL	59	35	34	69	138	—	—	—	—	—
1968–69	Swift Current Broncos	WCHL	33	16	16	32	65	—	—	—	—	—
1968–69	Sorel Black Hawks	MMJHL	18	15	19	34	61	—	—	—	—	—
1969–70	Salem Rebels	EHL	67	32	37	69	356	5	2	3	5	23
1969–70	Quebec Aces	AHL	8	0	0	0	13	—	—	—	—	—
1970–71	Quebec Aces	AHL	71	14	23	37	382	1	0	0	0	15
1971–72	Richmond Robins	AHL	76	18	28	46	392	—	—	—	—	—
1971–72	Philadelphia Flyers	NHL	1	0	0	0	0	—	—	—	—	—
1972–73	Philadelphia Flyers	NHL	76	9	12	21	**259**	11	1	0	1	**51**
1973–74	Philadelphia Flyers	NHL	73	20	16	36	**348**	**17**	2	4	6	**139**
1974–75	Philadelphia Flyers	NHL	76	9	17	26	**472**	**17**	2	3	5	**83**
1975–76	Philadelphia Flyers	NHL	71	13	19	32	307	**16**	2	2	4	**90**
1976–77	Los Angeles Kings	NHL	76	10	20	30	232	9	1	1	2	45
1977–78	Los Angeles Kings	NHL	8	2	0	2	**27**	—	—	—	—	—
1977–78	Pittsburgh Penguins	NHL	66	9	25	34	**378**	—	—	—	—	—
1978–79	Pittsburgh Penguins	NHL	47	4	9	13	157	—	—	—	—	—
1978–79	Buffalo Sabres	NHL	28	2	3	5	86	3	0	2	2	4
1979–80	Buffalo Sabres	NHL	13	1	0	1	28	—	—	—	—	—
1979–80	Rochester Americans	AHL	56	10	14	24	248	4	1	0	1	12
NHL totals			535	79	121	200	2,294	73	8	12	20	412

=== Coaching record ===
Team	Season	League	Regular season					Postseason
Team	Season	League	G	W	L	T	OTL	Result
New York Slapshots	1985–86	ACHL	59	21	38	0	0	Out of playoffs
Madison Monsters	1996–97	CoHL	74	46	21	0	7	Lost in round 1
Baton Rouge Kingfish	1997–98	ECHL	59	26	24	9	0	Out of playoffs
Mohawk Valley Prowlers	1998–99	UHL						
Elmira Jackals	2004–05	UHL	21	5	16	0	0	Out of playoffs

== Filmography ==
Year	Title	Role	Notes
2016	Ice Guardians	Himself	Documentary
2022	The Simpsons	Himself (voice)	Episode: "Top Goon"

== See also ==
- List of NHL players with 2000 career penalty minutes
- NHL career leaders, penalty minutes
