= 1973–74 Detroit Red Wings season =

National Hockey League team season

1973–74 Detroit Red Wings
- Division: 6th East
- 1973–74 record: 29–39–10
- Home record: 21–12–6
- Road record: 8–27–4
- Goals for: 255
- Goals against: 319

Team information
- General manager: Ned Harkness (Oct–Feb); Alex Delvecchio (Feb–Apr)
- Coach: Ted Garvin (Oct–Nov); Alex Delvecchio (Nov–Apr)
- Captain: Alex Delvecchio (Oct); Rotating; Nick Libett; Red Berenson; Gary Bergman; Ted Harris; Mickey Redmond; Larry Johnston
- Alternate captains: Mickey Redmond; Nick Libett; Larry Johnston
- Arena: Detroit Olympia

Team leaders
- Goals: Mickey Redmond (51)
- Assists: Marcel Dionne (54)
- Points: Marcel Dionne (78)
- Penalty minutes: Larry Johnston (139)
- Wins: Doug Grant (15)
- Goals against average: Bill McKenzie (3.58)

The 1973–74 Detroit Red Wings season was the franchise's 48th season of competition, 42nd season as the Red Wings. The Red Wings failed to qualify for the playoffs for the fourth straight year for the first time in franchise history.

== Regular season ==
=== Final standings ===
East Division
		GP	W	L	T	GF	GA	DIFF	Pts
1	Boston Bruins	78	52	17	9	349	221	+128	113
2	Montreal Canadiens	78	45	24	9	293	240	+53	99
3	New York Rangers	78	40	24	14	300	251	+49	94
4	Toronto Maple Leafs	78	35	27	16	274	230	+44	86
5	Buffalo Sabres	78	32	34	12	242	250	−8	76
6	Detroit Red Wings	78	29	39	10	255	319	−64	68
7	Vancouver Canucks	78	24	43	11	224	296	−72	59
8	New York Islanders	78	19	41	18	182	247	−65	56

=== Record vs. opponents ===
==== Vs. East Division ====
1973–74 NHL records
Team	BOS	BUF	DET	MTL	NYI	NYR	TOR	VAN	Total
Boston	—	4–1	4–1–1	4–2	4–1	4–1	4–2	4–0–1	28–8–2
Buffalo	1–4	—	5–1	0–3–2	3–0–2	2–2–1	2–3–1	2–4	15–17–6
Detroit	1–4–1	1–5	—	2–3	4–1	2–3–1	2–2–1	2–3	14–21–3
Montreal	2–4	3–0–2	3–2	—	4–1–1	4–2	2–3	4–0–1	22–12–4
N.Y. Islanders	1–4	0–3–2	1–4	1–4–1	—	1–4	0–4–2	2–1–3	6–24–8
N.Y. Rangers	1–4	2–2–1	3–2–1	2–4	4–1	—	1–2–2	4–1–1	17–16–5
Toronto	2–4	3–2–1	2–2–1	3–2	4–0–2	2–1–2	—	0–4–1	16–15–7
Vancouver	0–4–1	4–2	3–2	0–4–1	1–2–3	1–4–1	4–0–1	—	13–18–7

==== Vs. West Division ====
1973–74 NHL records
Team	ATL	CAL	CHI	LAK	MIN	PHI	PIT	STL	Total
Boston	2–3	4–1	0–2–3	3–1–1	3–0–2	3–1–1	5–0	4–1	24–9–7
Buffalo	1–3–1	3–2	2–0–3	4–1	3–1–1	0–5	2–3	2–2–1	17–17–6
Detroit	1–3–1	4–1	0–4–1	3–1–1	2–1–2	0–5	2–2–1	3–1–1	15–18–7
Montreal	2–3	3–1–1	2–2–1	3–1–1	4–1	2–2–1	4–0–1	3–2	23–12–5
N.Y. Islanders	3–1–1	2–1–2	1–2–2	1–3–1	3–1–1	0–5	1–2–2	2–2–1	13–17–10
N.Y. Rangers	2–1–2	5–0	1–3–1	2–1–2	4–0–1	2–1–2	4–1	3–1–1	23–8–9
Toronto	4–0–1	4–0–1	1–3–1	2–1–2	3–1–1	0–4–1	3–1–1	2–2–1	19–12–9
Vancouver	2–3	4–1	0–4–1	2–3	0–4–1	1–3–1	1–4	1–3–1	11–25–4

== Schedule and results ==
1973–74 regular season
October

Game	Result	Date	Score	Opponent	Record
1	L	October 10, 1973	1–4	@ New York Rangers (1973–74)	0–1–0
2	L	October 13, 1973	4–9	Boston Bruins (1973–74)	0–2–0
3	L	October 14, 1973	2–5	@ Philadelphia Flyers (1973–74)	0–3–0
4	L	October 16, 1973	2–3	St. Louis Blues (1973–74)	0–4–0
5	T	October 18, 1973	4–4	Minnesota North Stars (1973–74)	0–4–1
6	W	October 21, 1973	11–2	California Golden Seals (1973–74)	1–4–1
7	L	October 24, 1973	3–7	@ California Golden Seals (1973–74)	1–5–1
8	L	October 26, 1973	3–8	@ Vancouver Canucks (1973–74)	1–6–1
9	W	October 27, 1973	3–2	@ Los Angeles Kings (1973–74)	2–6–1
10	L	October 30, 1973	0–7	@ Toronto Maple Leafs (1973–74)	2–7–1

November

Game	Result	Date	Score	Opponent	Record
11	L	November 4, 1973	0–2	@ Atlanta Flames (1973–74)	2–8–1
12	L	November 7, 1973	1–4	Philadelphia Flyers (1973–74)	2–9–1
13	W	November 10, 1973	4–2	@ Minnesota North Stars (1973–74)	3–9–1
14	W	November 11, 1973	5–4	Toronto Maple Leafs (1973–74)	4–9–1
15	W	November 14, 1973	4–3	New York Islanders (1973–74)	5–9–1
16	L	November 17, 1973	0–8	@ Boston Bruins (1973–74)	5–10–1
17	W	November 18, 1973	6–4	Montreal Canadiens (1973–74)	6–10–1
18	W	November 20, 1973	6–5	Los Angeles Kings (1973–74)	7–10–1
19	L	November 22, 1973	3–5	@ New York Islanders (1973–74)	7–11–1
20	W	November 24, 1973	6–4	New York Islanders (1973–74)	8–11–1
21	W	November 25, 1973	3–2	California Golden Seals (1973–74)	9–11–1
22	L	November 29, 1973	3–4	@ Atlanta Flames (1973–74)	9–12–1

December

Game	Result	Date	Score	Opponent	Record
23	L	December 1, 1973	1–4	Buffalo Sabres (1973–74)	9–13–1
24	L	December 2, 1973	1–6	@ Buffalo Sabres (1973–74)	9–14–1
25	L	December 5, 1973	2–8	Chicago Black Hawks (1973–74)	9–15–1
26	T	December 7, 1973	1–1	@ St. Louis Blues (1973–74)	9–15–2
27	L	December 8, 1973	0–3	@ Minnesota North Stars (1973–74)	9–16–2
28	W	December 13, 1973	7–3	St. Louis Blues (1973–74)	10–16–2
29	W	December 15, 1973	2–0	@ Pittsburgh Penguins (1973–74)	11–16–2
30	W	December 16, 1973	7–5	Vancouver Canucks (1973–74)	12–16–2
31	T	December 18, 1973	4–4	Los Angeles Kings (1973–74)	12–16–3
32	L	December 20, 1973	2–5	@ New York Rangers (1973–74)	12–17–3
33	W	December 22, 1973	4–2	Boston Bruins (1973–74)	13–17–3
34	T	December 26, 1973	2–2	Pittsburgh Penguins (1973–74)	13–17–4
35	L	December 27, 1973	1–3	@ Buffalo Sabres (1973–74)	13–18–4
36	W	December 30, 1973	4–2	Atlanta Flames (1973–74)	14–18–4
37	L	December 31, 1973	5–6	Buffalo Sabres (1973–74)	14–19–4

January

Game	Result	Date	Score	Opponent	Record
38	L	January 2, 1974	3–4	@ Toronto Maple Leafs (1973–74)	14–20–4
39	W	January 6, 1974	9–6	Minnesota North Stars (1973–74)	15–20–4
40	T	January 9, 1974	2–2	@ Minnesota North Stars (1973–74)	15–20–5
41	W	January 12, 1974	6–0	Los Angeles Kings (1973–74)	16–20–5
42	L	January 13, 1974	1–4	@ Chicago Black Hawks (1973–74)	16–21–5
43	T	January 16, 1974	4–4	New York Rangers (1973–74)	16–21–6
44	W	January 19, 1974	5–2	@ St. Louis Blues (1973–74)	17–21–6
45	L	January 20, 1974	2–3	Montreal Canadiens (1973–74)	17–22–6
46	W	January 23, 1974	6–2	California Golden Seals (1973–74)	18–22–6
47	T	January 25, 1974	2–2	@ Atlanta Flames (1973–74)	18–22–7
48	W	January 27, 1974	6–5	Pittsburgh Penguins (1973–74)	19–22–7
49	L	January 30, 1974	3–7	Vancouver Canucks (1973–74)	19–23–7

February

Game	Result	Date	Score	Opponent	Record
50	L	February 2, 1974	2–12	@ Philadelphia Flyers (1973–74)	19–24–7
51	L	February 3, 1974	1–4	Montreal Canadiens (1973–74)	19–25–7
52	T	February 6, 1974	2–2	@ Toronto Maple Leafs (1973–74)	19–25–8
53	L	February 9, 1974	4–5	@ Vancouver Canucks (1973–74)	19–26–8
54	L	February 13, 1974	3–5	@ Pittsburgh Penguins (1973–74)	19–27–8
55	L	February 15, 1974	4–9	@ Montreal Canadiens (1973–74)	19–28–8
56	L	February 17, 1974	1–2	@ Buffalo Sabres (1973–74)	19–29–8
57	L	February 20, 1974	1–3	Philadelphia Flyers (1973–74)	19–30–8
58	W	February 23, 1974	5–3	St. Louis Blues (1973–74)	20–30–8
59	W	February 24, 1974	5–3	New York Islanders (1973–74)	21–30–8
60	W	February 26, 1974	7–3	Toronto Maple Leafs (1973–74)	22–30–8
61	L	February 28, 1974	1–8	@ Boston Bruins (1973–74)	22–31–8

March

Game	Result	Date	Score	Opponent	Record
62	T	March 2, 1974	4–4	Boston Bruins (1973–74)	22–31–9
63	T	March 3, 1974	6–6	Chicago Black Hawks (1973–74)	22–31–10
64	L	March 7, 1974	1–6	@ Philadelphia Flyers (1973–74)	22–32–10
65	W	March 9, 1974	3–1	@ New York Islanders (1973–74)	23–32–10
66	L	March 10, 1974	0–4	Atlanta Flames (1973–74)	23–33–10
67	W	March 12, 1974	2–1	@ Vancouver Canucks (1973–74)	24–33–10
68	W	March 13, 1974	5–2	@ California Golden Seals (1973–74)	25–33–10
69	L	March 16, 1974	0–2	@ Los Angeles Kings (1973–74)	25–34–10
70	W	March 20, 1974	7–6	@ Montreal Canadiens (1973–74)	26–34–10
71	W	March 23, 1974	5–3	New York Rangers (1973–74)	27–34–10
72	L	March 24, 1974	0–8	@ Pittsburgh Penguins (1973–74)	27–35–10
73	W	March 27, 1974	3–1	Buffalo Sabres (1973–74)	28–35–10
74	L	March 30, 1974	1–2	Chicago Black Hawks (1973–74)	28–36–10
75	L	March 31, 1974	1–6	@ Boston Bruins (1973–74)	28–37–10

April

Game	Result	Date	Score	Opponent	Record
76	L	April 3, 1974	3–5	@ New York Rangers (1973–74)	28–38–10
77	W	April 6, 1974	8–3	New York Rangers (1973–74)	29–38–10
78	L	April 7, 1974	4–7	@ Chicago Black Hawks (1973–74)	29–39–10

Legend: Win (2 points) Loss (0 points) Tie (1 point)

== Player statistics ==
=== Regular season ===
Scoring

Player	Pos	GP	G	A	Pts	PIM	+/-	PPG	SHG	GWG
Marcel Dionne	C	74	24	54	78	10	−31	3	0	1
Mickey Redmond	RW	76	51	26	77	14	−21	21	0	9
Red Berenson	C	76	24	42	66	28	−22	6	1	2
Guy Charron	C	76	25	30	55	10	−31	6	0	2
Nick Libett	LW	67	24	24	48	37	−26	3	1	5
Bill Hogaboam	C	47	18	23	41	12	−3	6	0	0
Pierre Jarry	LW	52	15	23	38	17	−11	2	0	0
Doug Roberts	RW	57	12	25	37	33	−9	2	0	1
Henry Boucha	C	70	19	12	31	32	−22	2	3	5
Bill Collins	RW	54	13	15	28	37	−20	2	3	0
Garnet Bailey	LW	45	9	14	23	33	−12	3	0	2
Brent Hughes	D	69	1	21	22	92	−28	0	0	0
Ron Stackhouse	D	33	2	14	16	33	1	0	0	0
Larry Johnston	D	65	2	12	14	139	−26	0	0	1
Jack Lynch	D	35	3	9	12	27	−14	1	0	1
Ted Harris	D	41	0	11	11	66	−4	0	0	0
Robbie Ftorek	C/LW	12	2	5	7	4	1	1	0	0
Tom Mellor	D	25	2	4	6	25	−9	0	0	0
Gary Bergman	D	11	0	6	6	18	−6	0	0	0
Nelson Debenedet	LW	15	4	1	5	2	1	0	0	0
Alex Delvecchio	C/LW	11	1	4	5	2	−13	1	0	0
Tim Ecclestone	LW	14	0	5	5	6	−6	0	0	0
Al McLeod	D	26	2	2	4	24	−7	0	0	0
Danny Gruen	LW	18	1	3	4	7	0	0	0	0
Blair Stewart	C	17	0	4	4	16	−6	0	0	0
Bryan Watson	D	21	0	4	4	99	−1	0	0	0
Thommie Bergman	D	43	0	3	3	21	−15	0	0	0
Jean Hamel	D	22	0	3	3	40	−12	0	0	0
Jim Rutherford	G	25	0	3	3	2	0	0	0	0
Tord Lundstrom	LW	11	1	1	2	0	−2	0	0	0
Chris Evans	D	23	0	2	2	2	−4	0	0	0
Len Fontaine	RW	7	0	1	1	4	−2	0	0	0
Terry Richardson	G	9	0	1	1	0	0	0	0	0
Murray Wing	D	1	0	1	1	0	−2	0	0	0
Denis DeJordy	G	1	0	0	0	0	0	0	0	0
Roy Edwards	G	4	0	0	0	0	0	0	0	0
Rick Foley	D	7	0	0	0	4	−7	0	0	0
Doug Grant	G	37	0	0	0	2	0	0	0	0
Mike Korney	RW	2	0	0	0	0	−3	0	0	0
Brian Lavender	LW	4	0	0	0	11	−4	0	0	0
Bill McKenzie	G	13	0	0	0	2	0	0	0	0
Rick Newell	D	3	0	0	0	0	−1	0	0	0
Nelson Pyatt	C	5	0	0	0	0	−2	0	0	0

Goaltending

Player	MIN	GP	W	L	T	GA	GAA	SO
Doug Grant	2018	37	15	16	2	140	4.16	1
Jim Rutherford	1420	25	9	11	4	86	3.63	0
Bill McKenzie	720	13	4	4	4	43	3.58	1
Terry Richardson	315	9	1	4	0	28	5.33	0
Denis DeJordy	20	1	0	1	0	4	12.00	0
Roy Edwards	187	4	0	3	0	18	5.78	0
Team:	4680	78	29	39	10	319	4.09	2

Note: GP = Games played; G = Goals; A = Assists; Pts = Points; +/- = Plus-minus PIM = Penalty minutes; PPG = Power-play goals; SHG = Short-handed goals; GWG = Game-winning goals;
MIN = Minutes played; W = Wins; L = Losses; T = Ties; GA = Goals against; GAA = Goals-against average; SO = Shutouts;

== Awards and records ==
- Alex Delvecchio, Lester Patrick Trophy

== Draft picks ==
Detroit's draft picks at the 1973 NHL amateur draft held at the Queen Elizabeth Hotel in Montreal.

Round	#	Player	Nationality	College/Junior/Club team (League)
1	11	Terry Richardson	Canada	New Westminster Bruins (WCHL)
3	39	Nelson Pyatt	Canada	Oshawa Generals (OHA)
3	43	Robbie Neale	Canada	Brandon Wheat Kings (WCHL)
4	59	Mike Korney	Canada	Winnipeg Jets (WCHL)
5	75	Blair Stewart	Canada	Winnipeg Jets (WCHL)
6	91	Glen Cickello	Canada	Hamilton Red Wings (OHA)
7	107	Brian Middleton	Canada	University of Alberta (CIAU)
8	118	Dennis Polonich	Canada	Flin Flon Bombers (WCHL)
8	123	George Lyle	Canada	Michigan Tech University (NCAA)
9	135	Dennis O'Brien	Canada	Laurentian University (CIAU)
9	138	Tom Newman	Canada	Kitchener Rangers (OHA)
9	139	Ray Bibeau	Canada	Montreal Junior Canadiens (QMJHL)
10	151	Kevin Neville	Canada	Toronto Marlboros (OHA)
10	154	Ken Gibb	Canada	University of North Dakota (NCAA)
10	155	Mitch Brandt	United States	University of Denver (NCAA)

== See also ==
- 1973–74 NHL season
- 1974 in Michigan
