= 1973–74 Atlanta Flames season =

NHL team season

1973–74 Atlanta Flames
- Division: 4th West
- 1973–74 record: 30–34–14
- Home record: 17–15–7
- Road record: 13–19–7
- Goals for: 214
- Goals against: 238

Team information
- General manager: Cliff Fletcher
- Coach: Bernie Geoffrion
- Captain: Keith McCreary
- Alternate captains: Pat Quinn; Noel Price; Bob Leiter
- Arena: Omni Coliseum

Team leaders
- Goals: Jacques Richard (27)
- Assists: Tom Lysiak (45)
- Points: Tom Lysiak (64)
- Penalty minutes: Pat Quinn (94)
- Wins: Dan Bouchard (19)
- Goals against average: Dan Bouchard (2.77)

The 1973–74 Atlanta Flames season was the second season for the franchise.

== Regular season ==
=== Season standings ===
West Division
		GP	W	L	T	GF	GA	DIFF	Pts
1	Philadelphia Flyers	78	50	16	12	273	164	+109	112
2	Chicago Black Hawks	78	41	14	23	272	164	+108	105
3	Los Angeles Kings	78	33	33	12	233	231	+2	78
4	Atlanta Flames	78	30	34	14	214	238	−24	74
5	Pittsburgh Penguins	78	28	41	9	242	273	−31	65
6	St. Louis Blues	78	26	40	12	206	248	−42	64
7	Minnesota North Stars	78	23	38	17	235	275	−40	63
8	California Golden Seals	78	13	55	10	195	342	−147	36

=== Record vs. opponents ===
==== Vs. West Division ====
1973–74 NHL records
Team	ATL	CAL	CHI	LAK	MIN	PHI	PIT	STL	Total
Atlanta	—	4–0–1	1–2–2	1–5	3–2	2–2–2	1–3–2	1–3–1	13–17–8
California	0–4–1	—	1–3–2	1–4	1–3–2	0–5	1–4	2–3–1	6–26–6
Chicago	2–1–2	3–1–2	—	3–1–2	3–1–1	2–2–1	5–1	3–0–2	21–7–10
Los Angeles	5–1	4–1	1–3–2	—	2–3–1	2–2–1	4–1	3–2	21–13–4
Minnesota	2–3	3–1–2	1–3–1	3–2–1	—	0–4–2	2–2–1	3–1–1	14–16–8
Philadelphia	2–2–2	5–0	2–2–1	2–2–1	4–0–2	—	3–2	6–0	24–8–6
Pittsburgh	3–1–2	4–1	1–5	1–4	2–2–1	2–3	—	2–3–1	15–19–4
St. Louis	3–1–1	3–2–1	0–3–2	2–3	1–3–1	0–6	3–2–1	—	12–20–6

==== Vs. East Division ====
1973–74 NHL records
Team	BOS	BUF	DET	MTL	NYI	NYR	TOR	VAN	Total
Atlanta	3–2	3–1–1	3–1–1	3–2	1–3–1	1–2–2	0–4–1	3–2	17–17–6
California	1–4	2–3	1–4	1–3–1	1–2–2	0–5	0–4–1	1–4	7–29–4
Chicago	2–0–3	0–2–3	4–0–1	2–2–1	2–1–2	3–1–1	3–1–1	4–0–1	20–7–13
Los Angeles	1–3–1	1–4	1–3–1	1–3–1	3–1–1	1–2–2	1–2–2	3–2	12–20–8
Minnesota	0–3–2	1–3–1	1–2–2	1–4	1–3–1	0–4–1	1–3–1	4–0–1	9–22–9
Philadelphia	1–3–1	5–0	5–0	2–2–1	5–0	1–2–2	4–0–1	3–1–1	26–8–6
Pittsburgh	0–5	3–2	2–2–1	0–4–1	2–1–2	1–4	1–3–1	4–1	13–22–5
St. Louis	1–4	2–2–1	1–3–1	2–3	2–2–1	1–3–1	2–2–1	3–1–1	14–20–6

== Schedule and results ==
1973–74 regular season
October

Game	Result	Date	Score	Opponent	Record	Attendance
1	T	October 10, 1973	1–1	New York Islanders (1973–74)	0–0–1	12,144
2	L	October 12, 1973	3–4	Pittsburgh Penguins (1973–74)	0–1–1	13,287
3	W	October 13, 1973	1–0	@ St. Louis Blues (1973–74)	1–1–1	18,836
4	W	October 17, 1973	4–3	Boston Bruins (1973–74)	2–1–1	14,498
5	W	October 20, 1973	4–2	@ Montreal Canadiens (1973–74)	3–1–1	16,616
6	L	October 23, 1973	0–3	@ Vancouver Canucks (1973–74)	3–2–1	15,570
7	L	October 24, 1973	4–6	@ Los Angeles Kings (1973–74)	3–3–1	8,367
8	W	October 26, 1973	3–1	@ California Golden Seals (1973–74)	4–3–1	N/A

November

Game	Result	Date	Score	Opponent	Record	Attendance
9	W	November 1, 1973	7–2	California Golden Seals (1973–74)	5–3–1	13,480
10	W	November 3, 1973	2–1	@ Philadelphia Flyers (1973–74)	6–3–1	17,007
11	W	November 4, 1973	2–0	Detroit Red Wings (1973–74)	7–3–1	13,659
12	T	November 7, 1973	2–2	St. Louis Blues (1973–74)	7–3–2	14,217
13	T	November 9, 1973	3–3	New York Rangers (1973–74)	7–3–3	15,141
14	T	November 10, 1973	4–4	@ Pittsburgh Penguins (1973–74)	7–3–4	11,342
15	L	November 14, 1973	1–3	Buffalo Sabres (1973–74)	7–4–4	13,123
16	L	November 16, 1973	1–6	Chicago Black Hawks (1973–74)	7–5–4	15,141
17	L	November 18, 1973	2–5	@ Boston Bruins (1973–74)	7–6–4	15,003
18	W	November 21, 1973	3–2	Buffalo Sabres (1973–74)	8–6–4	12,889
19	W	November 23, 1973	4–1	Vancouver Canucks (1973–74)	9–6–4	15,141
20	W	November 25, 1973	4–3	@ Buffalo Sabres (1973–74)	10–6–4	15,858
21	L	November 27, 1973	2–4	@ New York Islanders (1973–74)	10–7–4	12,016
22	W	November 29, 1973	4–3	Detroit Red Wings (1973–74)	11–7–4	13,128

December

Game	Result	Date	Score	Opponent	Record	Attendance
23	T	December 1, 1973	2–2	@ Pittsburgh Penguins (1973–74)	11–7–5	10,413
24	L	December 2, 1973	1–3	Montreal Canadiens (1973–74)	11–8–5	13,892
25	T	December 5, 1973	3–3	@ California Golden Seals (1973–74)	11–8–6	3,137
26	W	December 7, 1973	2–0	@ Vancouver Canucks (1973–74)	12–8–6	15,570
27	L	December 8, 1973	0–3	@ Los Angeles Kings (1973–74)	12–9–6	10,535
28	L	December 13, 1973	1–6	Toronto Maple Leafs (1973–74)	12–10–6	13,220
29	W	December 15, 1973	3–2	@ Philadelphia Flyers (1973–74)	13–10–6	17,007
30	L	December 16, 1973	1–2	Pittsburgh Penguins (1973–74)	13–11–6	12,510
31	L	December 19, 1973	2–4	@ Minnesota North Stars (1973–74)	13–12–6	14,756
32	L	December 21, 1973	1–2	St. Louis Blues (1973–74)	13–13–6	13,454
33	W	December 23, 1973	3–1	New York Rangers (1973–74)	14–13–6	13,627
34	W	December 27, 1973	6–4	Los Angeles Kings (1973–74)	15–13–6	15,141
35	T	December 29, 1973	3–3	@ Toronto Maple Leafs (1973–74)	15–13–7	16,485
36	L	December 30, 1973	2–4	@ Detroit Red Wings (1973–74)	15–14–7	14,518

January

Game	Result	Date	Score	Opponent	Record	Attendance
37	W	January 3, 1974	3–2	Chicago Black Hawks (1973–74)	16–14–7	14,002
38	L	January 6, 1974	2–5	@ New York Rangers (1973–74)	16–15–7	17,500
39	L	January 7, 1974	2–6	@ Toronto Maple Leafs (1973–74)	16–16–7	16,485
40	W	January 9, 1974	3–0	Buffalo Sabres (1973–74)	17–16–7	12,522
41	L	January 11, 1974	6–7	Philadelphia Flyers (1973–74)	17–17–7	15,141
42	L	January 13, 1974	0–1	@ Philadelphia Flyers (1973–74)	17–18–7	17,007
43	L	January 15, 1974	3–4	@ New York Islanders (1973–74)	17–19–7	12,524
44	W	January 18, 1974	6–2	California Golden Seals (1973–74)	18–19–7	14,118
45	L	January 20, 1974	1–3	St. Louis Blues (1973–74)	18–20–7	14,247
46	L	January 23, 1974	1–4	@ New York Rangers (1973–74)	18–21–7	17,500
47	T	January 25, 1974	2–2	Detroit Red Wings (1973–74)	18–21–8	14,568
48	L	January 27, 1974	2–5	Toronto Maple Leafs (1973–74)	18–22–8	13,192
49	L	January 31, 1974	2–4	@ Boston Bruins (1973–74)	18–23–8	15,003

February

Game	Result	Date	Score	Opponent	Record	Attendance
50	W	February 1, 1974	5–3	Montreal Canadiens (1973–74)	19–23–8	15,141
51	T	February 3, 1974	2–2	Philadelphia Flyers (1973–74)	19–23–9	14,123
52	T	February 6, 1974	1–1	@ Chicago Black Hawks (1973–74)	19–23–10	N/A
53	L	February 8, 1974	0–3	Chicago Black Hawks (1973–74)	19–24–10	15,141
54	L	February 10, 1974	3–6	Los Angeles Kings (1973–74)	19–25–10	13,652
55	W	February 12, 1974	4–1	@ New York Islanders (1973–74)	20–25–10	13,376
56	W	February 13, 1974	3–2	@ Montreal Canadiens (1973–74)	21–25–10	16,581
57	L	February 16, 1974	2–7	@ Toronto Maple Leafs (1973–74)	21–26–10	16,485
58	L	February 19, 1974	1–7	@ St. Louis Blues (1973–74)	21–27–10	18,249
59	T	February 21, 1974	4–4	@ Buffalo Sabres (1973–74)	21–27–11	15,858
60	W	February 23, 1974	5–3	@ Minnesota North Stars (1973–74)	22–27–11	15,570
61	L	February 26, 1974	5–6	Montreal Canadiens (1973–74)	22–28–11	14,598
62	L	February 28, 1974	1–3	Los Angeles Kings (1973–74)	22–29–11	14,064

March

Game	Result	Date	Score	Opponent	Record	Attendance
63	W	March 3, 1974	5–3	Vancouver Canucks (1973–74)	23–29–11	13,126
64	W	March 5, 1974	4–1	Boston Bruins (1973–74)	24–29–11	15,141
65	W	March 8, 1974	3–1	Minnesota North Stars (1973–74)	25–29–11	15,141
66	W	March 10, 1974	4–0	@ Detroit Red Wings (1973–74)	26–29–11	12,193
67	L	March 13, 1974	1–5	@ Minnesota North Stars (1973–74)	26–30–11	14,886
68	L	March 15, 1974	0–3	@ Vancouver Canucks (1973–74)	26–31–11	15,570
69	T	March 17, 1974	3–3	@ Chicago Black Hawks (1973–74)	26–31–12	N/A
70	T	March 21, 1974	5–5	New York Rangers (1973–74)	26–31–13	15,141
71	W	March 23, 1974	4–3	@ Boston Bruins (1973–74)	27–31–13	15,003
72	L	March 24, 1974	4–6	New York Islanders (1973–74)	27–32–13	15,141
73	T	March 28, 1974	3–3	Philadelphia Flyers (1973–74)	27–32–14	15,141
74	W	March 30, 1974	4–1	Minnesota North Stars (1973–74)	28–32–14	15,141
75	L	March 31, 1974	2–4	@ Pittsburgh Penguins (1973–74)	28–33–14	10,518

April

Game	Result	Date	Score	Opponent	Record	Attendance
76	L	April 3, 1974	2–4	@ Los Angeles Kings (1973–74)	28–34–14	11,519
77	W	April 5, 1974	4–2	@ California Golden Seals (1973–74)	29–34–14	4,867
78	W	April 7, 1974	6–3	Pittsburgh Penguins (1973–74)	30–34–14	15,141

Legend: Win (2 points) Loss (0 points) Tie (1 point)

== Playoffs ==
The Flames made the playoffs for the first time in franchise history in 1973–74, as they finished in fourth place in the West Division, setting up a first round playoff matchup against the first place Philadelphia Flyers. The Flyers finished the season with a 50–16–12 record, earning 112 points, which was 38 more points than Atlanta.

The best of seven series opened up at the Spectrum in Philadelphia in front of a sellout crowd of 17,007, and the Flyers opened the scoring with four seconds remaining in the first period, when Gary Dornhoefer scored a shorthanded goal. The Flyers extended their lead to 2–0 in the second period after Tom Bladon scored on the powerplay. In the third period, Orest Kindrachuk gave Philadelphia a 3–0 lead, however, thirty seconds later, Bob Murray scored the first ever playoff goal for Atlanta, cutting the lead to 3–1. Orest Kindrachuk added a second goal later in the third to give the Flyers a 4–1 opening game victory. Bernie Parent made 31 saves for the victory, while Phil Myre took the loss for Atlanta.

In the second game of the series, the Flyers took an early 1–0 lead on a goal by Terry Crisp. In the second period, Rick MacLeish scored a natural hat-trick, scoring three goals in a row, to give the Flyers a 4–0 lead. Rey Comeau broke the Flyers shutout bid in the third period, however, Jimmy Watson scored for Philadelphia, as the Flyers won the second game 5–1, taking a 2–0 series lead.

The series shifted to the Omni Coliseum for the third game, as the arena was sold out with 15,141 fans for the first ever playoff game in Atlanta. The Flyers opened the scoring with two quick goals in the first period, as Don Saleski and Bobby Clarke scored in the first 5:02 of the game to give Philadelphia a 2–0 lead. In the second period, Larry Romanchych responded for the Flames, cutting the lead to 2–1, however, the Flyers regained their two-goal lead when Rick MacLeish scored his fourth goal of the series. In the third period, Bill Barber scored for the Flyers, as they took the third game 4–1, and now had a 3–0 series lead.

In the fourth game, facing elimination, and in front of another sold out crowd, the Flames opened the scoring 3:28 into the game, when Larry Romanchych beat Bernie Parent to give Atlanta a 1–0 lead, their first lead of the series. In the second period, the Flames took a 3–0 lead, after goals by Jean Lemieux and Rey Comeau, however, the Flyers Andre Dupont scored a late period goal to cut the Flames lead to 3–1. Early in the third period, the Flyers Gary Dornhoefer scored on the powerplay to make the score 3–2. On another powerplay, Tom Bladon scored for Philadelphia, tying the game at 3–3. The game went into overtime, and the Flyers completed the comeback, when Dave Schultz beat Phil Myre, as the Flyers won the game 4–3, and eliminated the Flames from the post-season

1974 Stanley Cup playoffs
Quarterfinals vs. Philadelphia Flyers – Flyers win 4–0

Game	Date	Visitor	Score	Home	Series	Attendance
1	April 9	Atlanta Flames	1–4	Philadelphia Flyers	0–1	17,007
2	April 11	Atlanta Flames	1–5	Philadelphia Flyers	0–2	17,007
3	April 12	Philadelphia Flyers	4–1	Atlanta Flames	0–3	15,141
4	April 14	Philadelphia Flyers	4–3	Atlanta Flames	0–4	15,141

Legend: Win Loss

== Player statistics ==
=== Skaters ===
Note: GP = Games played; G = Goals; A = Assists; Pts = Points; PIM = Penalty minutes

		Regular season					Playoffs
Player	#	GP	G	A	Pts	PIM	GP	G	A	Pts	PIM
Tom Lysiak	12	77	19	45	64	54	4	0	2	2	0
Bob Leiter	16	78	26	26	52	10	4	0	0	0	2
Larry Romanchych	21	73	22	29	51	33	4	2	2	4	4
Jacques Richard	15	78	27	16	43	45	4	0	0	0	2
Curt Bennett	5	71	17	24	41	34	4	0	1	1	34
Keith McCreary	9	76	18	19	37	62	4	0	0	0	0
Randy Manery	7	78	8	29	37	75	4	0	2	2	4
Rey Comeau	18	78	11	23	34	16	4	2	1	3	6
John Stewart	17	74	18	15	33	41	4	0	0	0	10
Pat Quinn	3	77	5	27	32	94	4	0	0	0	6
Leon Rochefort	11	56	10	12	22	13	–	–	–	–	-
Al McDonough^{†}	14	35	10	9	19	15	4	0	0	0	2
Chuck Arnason^{‡}	14	33	7	6	13	13	–	–	–	–	-
Noel Price	4	62	0	13	13	38	4	0	0	0	6
Eric Vail	25	23	2	9	11	30	1	0	0	0	2
Jean Lemieux	6	32	3	5	8	6	3	1	1	2	0
Arnie Brown	19	48	2	6	8	29	4	0	0	0	0
Butch Deadmarsh	10	42	6	1	7	89	4	0	0	0	17
Bryan Hextall Jr.^{†}	20	40	2	4	6	55	4	0	1	1	16
Lew Morrison	8	52	1	4	5	0	–	–	–	–	-
Doug Mohns	2	28	0	3	3	10	–	–	–	–	-
Bob Murray	23	62	0	3	3	34	4	1	0	1	2
Ed Kea	24	3	0	2	2	0	–	–	–	–	-
Bob Paradise^{‡}	6	18	0	1	1	13	–	–	–	–	-
Don Martineau	24	4	0	0	0	2	–	–	–	–	-
Dwight Bialowas	22	11	0	0	0	4	–	–	–	–	-
Phil Myre	1	36	0	0	0	4	3
Dan Bouchard	30	46	0	0	0	10	1				10

^{†}Denotes player spent time with another team before joining Atlanta. Stats reflect time with the Flames only. ^{‡}Traded mid-season

=== Goaltending ===
Note: GP = Games played; TOI = Time on ice (minutes); W = Wins; L = Losses; OT = Overtime/shootout losses; GA = Goals against; SO = Shutouts; GAA = Goals against average

		Regular season								Playoffs
Player	#	GP	TOI	W	L	T	GA	SO	GAA	GP	TOI	W	L	GA	SO	GAA
Dan Bouchard	30	46	2660	19	18	8	123	5	2.77	1	60	0	1	4	0	4.00
Phil Myre	1	36	2020	11	16	6	112	0	3.33	3	186	0	3	13	0	4.19

== Transactions ==
The Flames were involved in the following transactions during the 1973–74 season.

=== Trades ===
May 29, 1973	To Atlanta Flames Chuck Arnason	To Montreal Canadiens 1st round pick in 1974 amateur draft (Rick Chartraw)
May 29, 1973	To Atlanta Flames Bob Murray	To Montreal Canadiens 3rd round pick in 1977 amateur draft (Pierre Lagace)
June 10, 1973	To Atlanta Flames cash	To California Golden Seals Ted Tucker
January 4, 1974	To Atlanta Flames Al McDonough	To Pittsburgh Penguins Chuck Arnason; Bob Paradise

=== Free agents ===
Player / Former team	Player / New team

=== Claimed off waivers ===
Player	Former team
C Bryan Hextall Jr.	Pittsburgh Penguins

=== Intra-league Draft ===
Player / Former team; D Doug Mohns / Minnesota North Stars	Player / New team; D Bill Plager / Minnesota North Stars

== NHL amateur draft ==
Round	Pick	Player	Nationality	College/Junior/Club team
1	2.	Tom Lysiak	Canada	Medicine Hat Tigers (WCHL)
1	16.	Vic Mercredi	Canada	New Westminster Bruins (WCHL)
2	21.	Eric Vail	Canada	Sudbury Wolves (OHA)
4	53.	Dean Talafous	United States	Wisconsin (NCAA)
5	69.	John Flesch	Canada	Lake Superior (NCAA)
6	85.	Ken Houston	Canada	Chatham Maroons (SOJHL)
7	101.	Tom Machowski	United States	Wisconsin (NCAA)
8	117.	Bob Law	Canada	North Dakota (NCAA)
9	130.	Bob Bilodeau	Canada	New Westminster Bruins (WCHL)
10	148.	Glen Surbey	Canada	Loyola College (CIAU)
10	149.	Guy Ross	Canada	Sherbrooke Beavers (QMJHL)
11	162.	Greg Fox	Canada	University of Michigan (NCAA)
