= 1973–74 Pittsburgh Penguins season =

NHL team season

1973–74 Pittsburgh Penguins
- Division: 5th West
- 1973–74 record: 28–41–9
- Home record: 15–18–6
- Road record: 13–23–3
- Goals for: 242
- Goals against: 271

Team information
- General manager: Jack Riley (Oct–Jan); Jack Button (Jan–Apr)
- Coach: Ken Schinkel; Marc Boileau
- Captain: Ron Schock
- Alternate captains: Syl Apps; Dave Burrows; Ron Lalonde
- Arena: Pittsburgh Civic Arena

Team leaders
- Goals: Lowell MacDonald (43)
- Assists: Syl Apps (61)
- Points: Syl Apps (85)
- Penalty minutes: Steve Durbano (138)
- Wins: Andy Brown (13)
- Goals against average: Gary Inness (3.26

The 1973–74 Pittsburgh Penguins season was the franchise's seventh season in the National Hockey League (NHL). The 'Century Line' of Syl Apps Jr., Lowell MacDonald and Jean Pronovost was established this season. The trio took their name as a result of combining for more than 100 goals over the course of the year. The Penguins failed to make the playoffs for the second consecutive year for the first time since the 1967–78 season and the 1968–69 season.

== Regular season ==
=== Final standings ===
West Division
		GP	W	L	T	GF	GA	DIFF	Pts
1	Philadelphia Flyers	78	50	16	12	273	164	+109	112
2	Chicago Black Hawks	78	41	14	23	272	164	+108	105
3	Los Angeles Kings	78	33	33	12	233	231	+2	78
4	Atlanta Flames	78	30	34	14	214	238	−24	74
5	Pittsburgh Penguins	78	28	41	9	242	273	−31	65
6	St. Louis Blues	78	26	40	12	206	248	−42	64
7	Minnesota North Stars	78	23	38	17	235	275	−40	63
8	California Golden Seals	78	13	55	10	195	342	−147	36

=== Record vs. opponents ===
==== Vs. West Division ====
1973–74 NHL records
Team	ATL	CAL	CHI	LAK	MIN	PHI	PIT	STL	Total
Atlanta	—	4–0–1	1–2–2	1–5	3–2	2–2–2	1–3–2	1–3–1	13–17–8
California	0–4–1	—	1–3–2	1–4	1–3–2	0–5	1–4	2–3–1	6–26–6
Chicago	2–1–2	3–1–2	—	3–1–2	3–1–1	2–2–1	5–1	3–0–2	21–7–10
Los Angeles	5–1	4–1	1–3–2	—	2–3–1	2–2–1	4–1	3–2	21–13–4
Minnesota	2–3	3–1–2	1–3–1	3–2–1	—	0–4–2	2–2–1	3–1–1	14–16–8
Philadelphia	2–2–2	5–0	2–2–1	2–2–1	4–0–2	—	3–2	6–0	24–8–6
Pittsburgh	3–1–2	4–1	1–5	1–4	2–2–1	2–3	—	2–3–1	15–19–4
St. Louis	3–1–1	3–2–1	0–3–2	2–3	1–3–1	0–6	3–2–1	—	12–20–6

==== Vs. East Division ====
1973–74 NHL records
Team	BOS	BUF	DET	MTL	NYI	NYR	TOR	VAN	Total
Atlanta	3–2	3–1–1	3–1–1	3–2	1–3–1	1–2–2	0–4–1	3–2	17–17–6
California	1–4	2–3	1–4	1–3–1	1–2–2	0–5	0–4–1	1–4	7–29–4
Chicago	2–0–3	0–2–3	4–0–1	2–2–1	2–1–2	3–1–1	3–1–1	4–0–1	20–7–13
Los Angeles	1–3–1	1–4	1–3–1	1–3–1	3–1–1	1–2–2	1–2–2	3–2	12–20–8
Minnesota	0–3–2	1–3–1	1–2–2	1–4	1–3–1	0–4–1	1–3–1	4–0–1	9–22–9
Philadelphia	1–3–1	5–0	5–0	2–2–1	5–0	1–2–2	4–0–1	3–1–1	26–8–6
Pittsburgh	0–5	3–2	2–2–1	0–4–1	2–1–2	1–4	1–3–1	4–1	13–22–5
St. Louis	1–4	2–2–1	1–3–1	2–3	2–2–1	1–3–1	2–2–1	3–1–1	14–20–6

== Schedule and results ==
1973–74 regular season
October: 4–4–1 (home: 1–3–0; road: 3–1–1), 9 points

#	Date	Visitor	Score	Home	Location	Record	Points
1	Oct 12	Pittsburgh Penguins	4–3	Atlanta Flames	Omni Coliseum	1–0–0	2
2	Oct 13	New York Rangers	8–2	Pittsburgh Penguins	Civic Arena	1–1–0	2
3	Oct 17	Pittsburgh Penguins	4–2	Minnesota North Stars	Met Center	2–1–0	4
4	Oct 20	California Golden Seals	3–5	Pittsburgh Penguins	Civic Arena	3–1–0	6
5	Oct 21	Pittsburgh Penguins	2–8	Boston Bruins	Boston Garden	3–2–0	6
6	Oct 24	Montreal Canadiens	3–2	Pittsburgh Penguins	Civic Arena	3–3–0	6
7	Oct 27	Philadelphia Flyers	6–0	Pittsburgh Penguins	Civic Arena	3–4–0	6
8	Oct 28	Pittsburgh Penguins	7–2	New York Rangers	Madison Square Garden (IV)	4–4–0	8
9	Oct 31	Pittsburgh Penguins	1–1	Montreal Canadiens	Montreal Forum	4–4–1	9

November: 3–7–2 (home: 2–3–2; road: 1–4–0), 8 points

#	Date	Visitor	Score	Home	Location	Record	Points
10	Nov 3	Pittsburgh Penguins	0–6	Toronto Maple Leafs	Maple Leaf Gardens	4–5–1	9
11	Nov 4	Pittsburgh Penguins	0–7	Philadelphia Flyers	The Spectrum	4–6–1	9
12	Nov 7	New York Islanders	1–1	Pittsburgh Penguins	Civic Arena	4–6–2	10
13	Nov 10	Atlanta Flames	4–4	Pittsburgh Penguins	Civic Arena	4–6–3	11
14	Nov 13	Minnesota North Stars	2–5	Pittsburgh Penguins	Civic Arena	5–6–3	13
15	Nov 15	Pittsburgh Penguins	3–5	St. Louis Blues	St. Louis Arena	5–7–3	13
16	Nov 17	Chicago Black Hawks	4–1	Pittsburgh Penguins	Civic Arena	5–8–3	13
17	Nov 18	Pittsburgh Penguins	0–7	New York Rangers	Madison Square Garden (IV)	5–9–3	13
18	Nov 21	Vancouver Canucks	4–5	Pittsburgh Penguins	Civic Arena	6–9–3	15
19	Nov 22	Pittsburgh Penguins	4–2	Toronto Maple Leafs	Maple Leaf Gardens	7–9–3	17
20	Nov 24	Montreal Canadiens	5–2	Pittsburgh Penguins	Civic Arena	7–10–3	17
21	Nov 28	Toronto Maple Leafs	4–3	Pittsburgh Penguins	Civic Arena	7–11–3	17

December: 2–10–2 (home: 1–4–1; road: 1–6–1), 6 points

#	Date	Visitor	Score	Home	Location	Record	Points
22	Dec 1	Atlanta Flames	2–2	Pittsburgh Penguins	Civic Arena	7–11–4	18
23	Dec 2	Pittsburgh Penguins	1–2	Chicago Black Hawks	Chicago Stadium	7–12–4	18
24	Dec 5	Pittsburgh Penguins	1–4	Los Angeles Kings	The Forum	7–13–4	18
25	Dec 7	Pittsburgh Penguins	3–4	California Golden Seals	Oakland Coliseum Arena	7–14–4	18
26	Dec 8	Pittsburgh Penguins	2–3	Vancouver Canucks	Pacific Coliseum	7–15–4	18
27	Dec 12	California Golden Seals	1–9	Pittsburgh Penguins	Civic Arena	8–15–4	20
28	Dec 15	Detroit Red Wings	2–0	Pittsburgh Penguins	Civic Arena	8–16–4	20
29	Dec 16	Pittsburgh Penguins	2–1	Atlanta Flames	Omni Coliseum	9–16–4	22
30	Dec 20	Pittsburgh Penguins	5–6	Boston Bruins	Boston Garden	9–17–4	22
31	Dec 22	New York Rangers	4–1	Pittsburgh Penguins	Civic Arena	9–18–4	22
32	Dec 23	Pittsburgh Penguins	2–3	Buffalo Sabres	Buffalo Memorial Auditorium	9–19–4	22
33	Dec 26	Pittsburgh Penguins	2–2	Detroit Red Wings	Olympia Stadium	9–19–5	23
34	Dec 28	St. Louis Blues	3–1	Pittsburgh Penguins	Civic Arena	9–20–5	23
35	Dec 29	Chicago Black Hawks	4–2	Pittsburgh Penguins	Civic Arena	9–21–5	23

January: 5–8–0 (home: 3–5–0; road: 2–3–0), 10 points

#	Date	Visitor	Score	Home	Location	Record	Points
36	Jan 2	Pittsburgh Penguins	4–8	Minnesota North Stars	Met Center	9–22–5	23
37	Jan 3	Pittsburgh Penguins	1–6	Buffalo Sabres	Buffalo Memorial Auditorium	9–23–5	23
38	Jan 5	Buffalo Sabres	2–5	Pittsburgh Penguins	Civic Arena	10–23–5	25
39	Jan 9	Toronto Maple Leafs	6–4	Pittsburgh Penguins	Civic Arena	10–24–5	25
40	Jan 12	Buffalo Sabres	2–5	Pittsburgh Penguins	Civic Arena	11–24–5	27
41	Jan 13	Boston Bruins	5–3	Pittsburgh Penguins	Civic Arena	11–25–5	27
42	Jan 16	Los Angeles Kings	2–0	Pittsburgh Penguins	Civic Arena	11–26–5	27
43	Jan 18	Pittsburgh Penguins	6–2	Vancouver Canucks	Pacific Coliseum	12–26–5	29
44	Jan 20	Pittsburgh Penguins	5–3	Philadelphia Flyers	The Spectrum	13–26–5	31
45	Jan 23	St. Louis Blues	1–4	Pittsburgh Penguins	Civic Arena	14–26–5	33
46	Jan 26	Los Angeles Kings	2–0	Pittsburgh Penguins	Civic Arena	14–27–5	33
47	Jan 27	Pittsburgh Penguins	5–6	Detroit Red Wings	Olympia Stadium	14–28–5	33
48	Jan 30	New York Rangers	4–2	Pittsburgh Penguins	Civic Arena	14–29–5	33

February: 5–6–1 (home: 3–2–1; road: 2–4–0), 11 points

#	Date	Visitor	Score	Home	Location	Record	Points
49	Feb 2	Chicago Black Hawks	3–1	Pittsburgh Penguins	Civic Arena	14–30–5	33
50	Feb 3	Pittsburgh Penguins	4–5	Boston Bruins	Boston Garden	14–31–5	33
51	Feb 7	Pittsburgh Penguins	4–5	Philadelphia Flyers	The Spectrum	14–32–5	33
52	Feb 9	Pittsburgh Penguins	3–2	New York Islanders	Nassau Veterans Memorial Coliseum	15–32–5	35
53	Feb 10	Pittsburgh Penguins	3–5	Chicago Black Hawks	Chicago Stadium	15–33–5	35
54	Feb 13	Detroit Red Wings	3–5	Pittsburgh Penguins	Civic Arena	16–33–5	37
55	Feb 16	California Golden Seals	3–7	Pittsburgh Penguins	Civic Arena	17–33–5	39
56	Feb 20	St. Louis Blues	1–1	Pittsburgh Penguins	Civic Arena	17–33–6	40
57	Feb 23	Boston Bruins	6–2	Pittsburgh Penguins	Civic Arena	17–34–6	40
58	Feb 24	Pittsburgh Penguins	4–2	Chicago Black Hawks	Chicago Stadium	18–34–6	42
59	Feb 27	Los Angeles Kings	1–4	Pittsburgh Penguins	Civic Arena	19–34–6	44
60	Feb 28	Pittsburgh Penguins	1–7	Montreal Canadiens	Montreal Forum	19–35–6	44

March: 7–4–3 (home: 3–1–2; road: 4–3–1), 17 points

#	Date	Visitor	Score	Home	Location	Record	Points
61	Mar 2	Vancouver Canucks	1–6	Pittsburgh Penguins	Civic Arena	20–35–6	46
62	Mar 5	Pittsburgh Penguins	2–1	New York Islanders	Nassau Veterans Memorial Coliseum	21–35–6	48
63	Mar 7	Pittsburgh Penguins	2–2	Toronto Maple Leafs	Maple Leaf Gardens	21–35–7	49
64	Mar 9	Pittsburgh Penguins	7–5	St. Louis Blues	St. Louis Arena	22–35–7	51
65	Mar 10	Montreal Canadiens	5–4	Pittsburgh Penguins	Civic Arena	22–36–7	51
66	Mar 13	Pittsburgh Penguins	1–5	Los Angeles Kings	The Forum	22–37–7	51
67	Mar 15	Pittsburgh Penguins	6–1	California Golden Seals	Oakland Coliseum Arena	23–37–7	53
68	Mar 16	Pittsburgh Penguins	8–6	Vancouver Canucks	Pacific Coliseum	24–37–7	55
69	Mar 20	New York Islanders	1–1	Pittsburgh Penguins	Civic Arena	24–37–8	56
70	Mar 23	Pittsburgh Penguins	1–5	Minnesota North Stars	Met Center	24–38–8	56
71	Mar 24	Detroit Red Wings	0–8	Pittsburgh Penguins	Civic Arena	25–38–8	58
72	Mar 27	Minnesota North Stars	3–3	Pittsburgh Penguins	Civic Arena	25–38–9	59
73	Mar 30	Pittsburgh Penguins	3–4	St. Louis Blues	St. Louis Arena	25–39–9	59
74	Mar 31	Atlanta Flames	2–4	Pittsburgh Penguins	Civic Arena	26–39–9	61

April: 2–2–0 (home: 2–0–0; road: 0–2–0), 4 points

#	Date	Visitor	Score	Home	Location	Record	Points
75	Apr 2	Pittsburgh Penguins	2–3	New York Islanders	Nassau Veterans Memorial Coliseum	26–40–9	61
76	Apr 4	Buffalo Sabres	2–4	Pittsburgh Penguins	Civic Arena	27–40–9	63
77	Apr 6	Philadelphia Flyers	1–6	Pittsburgh Penguins	Civic Arena	28–40–9	65
78	Apr 7	Pittsburgh Penguins	3–6	Atlanta Flames	Omni Coliseum	28–41–9	65

Legend: Win (2 points) Loss (0 points) Tie (1 point)

== Player statistics ==
Skaters

Regular season
Player	GP	G	A	Pts	+/−	PIM
Syl Apps Jr.	75	24	61	85	21	37
Lowell MacDonald	78	43	39	82	17	14
Jean Pronovost	77	40	32	72	9	22
Ron Schock	77	14	29	43	–27	22
Al McDonough^{‡}	37	14	22	36	–3	12
Ron Lalonde	73	10	17	27	2	14
Greg Polis^{‡}	41	14	13	27	–18	32
Wayne Bianchin	69	12	13	25	–15	38
Ron Stackhouse^{†}	36	4	15	19	12	33
Bob McManama	47	5	14	19	–12	18
Ab Demarco Jr.^{†}	34	7	12	19	5	4
Bernie Lukowich	53	9	10	19	–4	32
Chuck Arnason^{†}	41	13	5	18	–2	4
Steve Durbano^{†}	33	4	14	18	17	138
David Burrows	71	3	14	17	–13	30
J. Bob Kelly^{†}	30	7	10	17	–5	78
Nick Beverley^{†}	67	2	14	16	–16	21
Ted Snell	55	4	12	16	–22	8
Blaine Stoughton	34	5	6	11	–12	8
Bryan Hextall Jr.^{‡}	37	2	7	9	–13	39
Bob Paradise^{†}	38	2	7	9	–3	39
Jean-Guy Lagace	31	2	6	8	–12	34
Jack Lynch^{‡}	17	0	7	7	–15	21
Bryan Watson^{‡}	38	1	4	5	–12	137
Yvon Labre	16	1	2	3	–7	13
Ron Jones	25	0	3	3	–14	15
Jim Wiley	22	0	3	3	–4	2
Larry Bignell	20	0	3	3	–3	2
Darryl Edestrand^{‡}	3	0	0	0	–2	0
Hank Nowak	13	0	0	0	–14	11
Total		242	394	636	—	878

Goaltenders

Regular Season
Player	GP	W	L	T	GA	SO
Andy Brown	36	13	16	4	115	1
Gary Inness	20	7	10	1	56	0
James Rutherford^{‡}	26	7	12	4	82	0
Denis Herron	5	1	3	0	18	0
Total		28	41	9	271	1

^{†}Denotes player spent time with another team before joining the Penguins. Stats reflect time with the Penguins only.
^{‡}Denotes player was traded mid-season. Stats reflect time with the Penguins only.

== Transactions ==
The Penguins were involved in the following transactions during the 1973–74 season:

=== Trades ===
July 3, 1973	To Toronto Maple Leafs Eddie Shack	To Pittsburgh Penguins cash
October 4, 1973	To St. Louis Blues Nick Harbaruk	To Pittsburgh Penguins Bob Johnson
October 25, 1973	To Boston Bruins Darryl Edestrand	To Pittsburgh Penguins Nick Beverley
January 4, 1974	To Atlanta Flames Al McDonough	To Pittsburgh Penguins Chuck Arnason; Bob Paradise
January 17, 1974	To St. Louis Blues Greg Polis; Bryan Watson; 1974 2nd round pick	To Pittsburgh Penguins Ab DeMarco Jr. Steve Durbano; Bob Kelly
January 17, 1974	To Detroit Red Wings Jack Lynch; Jim Rutherford	To Pittsburgh Penguins Ron Stackhouse

=== Additions and subtractions ===
Additions
Player	Former team	Via
Gary Inness	University of Toronto Varsity Blues (CIAU)	free agency (1973–06)
Ron Jones	Boston Bruins	Intra-league Draft (1973–06–12)
Bob McManama	Harvard Crimson (Ivy League)	free agency (1973–08)
Ted Snell	Hershey Bears (AHL)	free agency (1973–10)

Subtractions
Player	New team	Via
Steve Cardwell	Minnesota Fighting Saints (WHA)	free agency (1973)
Paul Hoganson	Los Angeles Sharks (WHA)	free agency (1973)
Cam Newton	Chicago Cougars (WHA)	free agency (1973–05)
Rick Kessell	California Golden Seals	Reverse Draft (1973–06–13)
Bryan Hextall	Atlanta Flames	waivers (1974–01–06)

== Draft picks ==
Pittsburgh Penguins' picks at the 1973 NHL amateur draft.

Round	#	Player	Pos	Nationality	College/Junior/Club team (League)
1	7	Blaine Stoughton	Right wing	Canada	Flin Flon Bombers (WCHL)
2	23	Wayne Bianchin	Left wing	Canada	Flin Flon Bombers (WCHL)
2	27^{[a]}	Colin Campbell	Defense	Canada	Peterborough Petes (OHA)
4	55	Dennis Owchar	Defense	Canada	Toronto Marlboros (OHA)
5	71	Guido Tenesi	Defense	United States	Oshawa Generals (OHA)
6	87	Don Seiling	Left wing	Canada	Oshawa Generals (OHA)
7	103	Terry Ewasiuk	Left wing	Canada	Victoria Cougars (WCHL)
8	119	Fred Comrie	Center	Canada	Edmonton Oil Kings (WCHL)
9	134	Gordon Lane	Defense	Canada	New Westminster Bruins (WCHL)
10	150	Randy Aimoe	Defense	Canada	Medicine Hat Tigers (WCHL)
11	164	Don McLeod	Center	Canada	Saskatoon Blades (WCHL)

Draft notes

- ^{a} The Detroit Red Wings' second-round pick went to the Pittsburgh Penguins as a result of an October 6, 1972, trade that sent Roy Edwards to the Red Wings in exchange for a 1974 second-round pick and this pick.
- The Pittsburgh Penguins' third-round pick went to the Detroit Red Wings as the result of a February 25, 1973, trade that sent Andy Brown to the Penguins in exchange for this pick.
