= 1973–74 Boston Bruins season =

NHL team season

1973–74 Boston Bruins
- East Division champions
- Division: 1st East
- 1973–74 record: 52–17–9
- Home record: 33–4–2
- Road record: 19–13–7
- Goals for: 349
- Goals against: 221

Team information
- General manager: Harry Sinden
- Coach: Bep Guidolin
- Captain: Johnny Bucyk
- Alternate captains: Bobby Orr; Dallas Smith; Phil Esposito
- Arena: Boston Garden

Team leaders
- Goals: Phil Esposito (68)
- Assists: Bobby Orr (90)
- Points: Phil Esposito (145)
- Penalty minutes: Carol Vadnais (123)
- Wins: Gilles Gilbert (34)
- Goals against average: Ross Brooks (2.36)

The 1973–74 Boston Bruins season was the Bruins' 50th season in the NHL. They made it back to the Stanley Cup Finals, but lost to the Philadelphia Flyers in six games.

== Offseason ==
=== NHL draft ===
| Round | Pick | Player | Position | Nationality | College/junior/club team |
|---|---|---|---|---|---|
| 1 | 6 | Andre Savard | Center | Canada | Quebec Remparts (QMJHL) |
| 2 | 31 | Jimmy Jones | Right wing | Canada | Peterborough Petes (OHA) |
| 3 | 36 | Doug Gibson | Center | Canada | Peterborough Petes (OHA) |
| 3 | 47 | Al Sims | Defense | Canada | Cornwall Royals (QMJHL) |
| 4 | 63 | Steve Langdon | Left wing | Canada | London Knights (OHA) |
| 5 | 79 | Peter Crosbie | Goaltender | Canada | London Knights (OHA) |
| 6 | 95 | Jean-Pierre Burgoyne | Defense | Canada | Shawinigan Dynamos (QMJHL) |
| 7 | 111 | Walter Johnson | Right wing | United States | Oshawa Generals (OHA) |
| 8 | 127 | Virgil Gates | Defense | Canada | Swift Current Broncos (WCHL) |
| 9 | 142 | Jim Pettie | Goaltender | Canada | St. Catharines Black Hawks (OHA) |
| 10 | 157 | Yvan Bouillon | Center | Canada | Cornwall Royals (QMJHL) |

== Regular season ==
=== Season standings ===
East Division
| | | GP | W | L | T | GF | GA | DIFF | Pts |
|---|---|---|---|---|---|---|---|---|---|
| 1 | Boston Bruins | 78 | 52 | 17 | 9 | 349 | 221 | +128 | 113 |
| 2 | Montreal Canadiens | 78 | 45 | 24 | 9 | 293 | 240 | +53 | 99 |
| 3 | New York Rangers | 78 | 40 | 24 | 14 | 300 | 251 | +49 | 94 |
| 4 | Toronto Maple Leafs | 78 | 35 | 27 | 16 | 274 | 230 | +44 | 86 |
| 5 | Buffalo Sabres | 78 | 32 | 34 | 12 | 242 | 250 | −8 | 76 |
| 6 | Detroit Red Wings | 78 | 29 | 39 | 10 | 255 | 319 | −64 | 68 |
| 7 | Vancouver Canucks | 78 | 24 | 43 | 11 | 224 | 296 | −72 | 59 |
| 8 | New York Islanders | 78 | 19 | 41 | 18 | 182 | 247 | −65 | 56 |

=== Record vs. opponents ===
==== Vs. East Division ====
1973–74 NHL records
| Team | BOS | BUF | DET | MTL | NYI | NYR | TOR | VAN | Total |
|---|---|---|---|---|---|---|---|---|---|
| Boston | — | 4–1 | 4–1–1 | 4–2 | 4–1 | 4–1 | 4–2 | 4–0–1 | 28–8–2 |
| Buffalo | 1–4 | — | 5–1 | 0–3–2 | 3–0–2 | 2–2–1 | 2–3–1 | 2–4 | 15–17–6 |
| Detroit | 1–4–1 | 1–5 | — | 2–3 | 4–1 | 2–3–1 | 2–2–1 | 2–3 | 14–21–3 |
| Montreal | 2–4 | 3–0–2 | 3–2 | — | 4–1–1 | 4–2 | 2–3 | 4–0–1 | 22–12–4 |
| N.Y. Islanders | 1–4 | 0–3–2 | 1–4 | 1–4–1 | — | 1–4 | 0–4–2 | 2–1–3 | 6–24–8 |
| N.Y. Rangers | 1–4 | 2–2–1 | 3–2–1 | 2–4 | 4–1 | — | 1–2–2 | 4–1–1 | 17–16–5 |
| Toronto | 2–4 | 3–2–1 | 2–2–1 | 3–2 | 4–0–2 | 2–1–2 | — | 0–4–1 | 16–15–7 |
| Vancouver | 0–4–1 | 4–2 | 3–2 | 0–4–1 | 1–2–3 | 1–4–1 | 4–0–1 | — | 13–18–7 |

==== Vs. West Division ====
1973–74 NHL records
| Team | ATL | CAL | CHI | LAK | MIN | PHI | PIT | STL | Total |
|---|---|---|---|---|---|---|---|---|---|
| Boston | 2–3 | 4–1 | 0–2–3 | 3–1–1 | 3–0–2 | 3–1–1 | 5–0 | 4–1 | 24–9–7 |
| Buffalo | 1–3–1 | 3–2 | 2–0–3 | 4–1 | 3–1–1 | 0–5 | 2–3 | 2–2–1 | 17–17–6 |
| Detroit | 1–3–1 | 4–1 | 0–4–1 | 3–1–1 | 2–1–2 | 0–5 | 2–2–1 | 3–1–1 | 15–18–7 |
| Montreal | 2–3 | 3–1–1 | 2–2–1 | 3–1–1 | 4–1 | 2–2–1 | 4–0–1 | 3–2 | 23–12–5 |
| N.Y. Islanders | 3–1–1 | 2–1–2 | 1–2–2 | 1–3–1 | 3–1–1 | 0–5 | 1–2–2 | 2–2–1 | 13–17–10 |
| N.Y. Rangers | 2–1–2 | 5–0 | 1–3–1 | 2–1–2 | 4–0–1 | 2–1–2 | 4–1 | 3–1–1 | 23–8–9 |
| Toronto | 4–0–1 | 4–0–1 | 1–3–1 | 2–1–2 | 3–1–1 | 0–4–1 | 3–1–1 | 2–2–1 | 19–12–9 |
| Vancouver | 2–3 | 4–1 | 0–4–1 | 2–3 | 0–4–1 | 1–3–1 | 1–4 | 1–3–1 | 11–25–4 |

== Schedule and results ==
1973–74 regular season
October

| Game | Result | Date | Score | Opponent | Record |
|---|---|---|---|---|---|
| 1 | W | October 10, 1973 | 6–4 | Vancouver Canucks (1973–74) | 1–0–0 |
| 2 | W | October 13, 1973 | 9–4 | @ Detroit Red Wings (1973–74) | 2–0–0 |
| 3 | W | October 14, 1973 | 3–2 | New York Islanders (1973–74) | 3–0–0 |
| 4 | L | October 17, 1973 | 3–4 | @ Atlanta Flames (1973–74) | 3–1–0 |
| 5 | W | October 21, 1973 | 8–2 | Pittsburgh Penguins (1973–74) | 4–1–0 |
| 6 | L | October 23, 1973 | 2–3 | @ St. Louis Blues (1973–74) | 4–2–0 |
| 7 | W | October 25, 1973 | 9–4 | Buffalo Sabres (1973–74) | 5–2–0 |
| 8 | W | October 27, 1973 | 3–2 | @ Toronto Maple Leafs (1973–74) | 6–2–0 |
| 9 | T | October 28, 1973 | 3–3 | Minnesota North Stars (1973–74) | 6–2–1 |
| 10 | W | October 31, 1973 | 5–0 | @ Minnesota North Stars (1973–74) | 7–2–1 |

November

| Game | Result | Date | Score | Opponent | Record |
|---|---|---|---|---|---|
| 11 | L | November 3, 1973 | 4–6 | @ New York Islanders (1973–74) | 7–3–1 |
| 12 | W | November 4, 1973 | 4–1 | California Golden Seals (1973–74) | 8–3–1 |
| 13 | L | November 7, 1973 | 3–7 | @ New York Rangers (1973–74) | 8–4–1 |
| 14 | W | November 8, 1973 | 2–1 | Montreal Canadiens (1973–74) | 9–4–1 |
| 15 | W | November 11, 1973 | 4–2 | Vancouver Canucks (1973–74) | 10–4–1 |
| 16 | W | November 14, 1973 | 4–3 | @ Montreal Canadiens (1973–74) | 11–4–1 |
| 17 | W | November 15, 1973 | 10–2 | New York Rangers (1973–74) | 12–4–1 |
| 18 | W | November 17, 1973 | 8–0 | Detroit Red Wings (1973–74) | 13–4–1 |
| 19 | W | November 18, 1973 | 5–2 | Atlanta Flames (1973–74) | 14–4–1 |
| 20 | W | November 22, 1973 | 4–2 | Philadelphia Flyers (1973–74) | 15–4–1 |
| 21 | W | November 25, 1973 | 3–1 | Los Angeles Kings (1973–74) | 16–4–1 |
| 22 | T | November 28, 1973 | 3–3 | @ Chicago Black Hawks (1973–74) | 16–4–2 |

December

| Game | Result | Date | Score | Opponent | Record |
|---|---|---|---|---|---|
| 23 | W | December 2, 1973 | 5–3 | New York Islanders (1973–74) | 17–4–2 |
| 24 | W | December 8, 1973 | 5–2 | Buffalo Sabres (1973–74) | 18–4–2 |
| 25 | T | December 9, 1973 | 3–3 | @ Philadelphia Flyers (1973–74) | 18–4–3 |
| 26 | W | December 13, 1973 | 4–2 | Minnesota North Stars (1973–74) | 19–4–3 |
| 27 | W | December 15, 1973 | 7–2 | Vancouver Canucks (1973–74) | 20–4–3 |
| 28 | W | December 16, 1973 | 5–3 | California Golden Seals (1973–74) | 21–4–3 |
| 29 | W | December 20, 1973 | 6–5 | Pittsburgh Penguins (1973–74) | 22–4–3 |
| 30 | L | December 22, 1973 | 2–4 | @ Detroit Red Wings (1973–74) | 22–5–3 |
| 31 | W | December 23, 1973 | 4–3 | Toronto Maple Leafs (1973–74) | 23–5–3 |
| 32 | L | December 29, 1973 | 1–4 | @ Los Angeles Kings (1973–74) | 23–6–3 |
| 33 | W | December 30, 1973 | 8–1 | @ California Golden Seals (1973–74) | 24–6–3 |

January

| Game | Result | Date | Score | Opponent | Record |
|---|---|---|---|---|---|
| 34 | T | January 1, 1974 | 2–2 | @ Vancouver Canucks (1973–74) | 24–6–4 |
| 35 | W | January 4, 1974 | 4–2 | @ New York Rangers (1973–74) | 25–6–4 |
| 36 | W | January 5, 1974 | 6–2 | @ New York Islanders (1973–74) | 26–6–4 |
| 37 | T | January 10, 1974 | 2–2 | Chicago Black Hawks (1973–74) | 26–6–5 |
| 38 | L | January 12, 1974 | 3–7 | Montreal Canadiens (1973–74) | 26–7–5 |
| 39 | W | January 13, 1974 | 5–3 | @ Pittsburgh Penguins (1973–74) | 27–7–5 |
| 40 | T | January 16, 1974 | 5–5 | @ Chicago Black Hawks (1973–74) | 27–7–6 |
| 41 | W | January 19, 1974 | 8–0 | @ Montreal Canadiens (1973–74) | 28–7–6 |
| 42 | W | January 20, 1974 | 5–2 | Los Angeles Kings (1973–74) | 29–7–6 |
| 43 | W | January 22, 1974 | 1–0 | @ St. Louis Blues (1973–74) | 30–7–6 |
| 44 | L | January 24, 1974 | 1–2 | Chicago Black Hawks (1973–74) | 30–8–6 |
| 45 | W | January 26, 1974 | 4–0 | @ New York Islanders (1973–74) | 31–8–6 |
| 46 | W | January 27, 1974 | 5–3 | Philadelphia Flyers (1973–74) | 32–8–6 |
| 47 | W | January 31, 1974 | 4–2 | Atlanta Flames (1973–74) | 33–8–6 |

February

| Game | Result | Date | Score | Opponent | Record |
|---|---|---|---|---|---|
| 48 | L | February 2, 1974 | 2–6 | @ Toronto Maple Leafs (1973–74) | 33–9–6 |
| 49 | W | February 3, 1974 | 5–4 | Pittsburgh Penguins (1973–74) | 34–9–6 |
| 50 | W | February 7, 1974 | 5–3 | St. Louis Blues (1973–74) | 35–9–6 |
| 51 | W | February 9, 1974 | 5–3 | Philadelphia Flyers (1973–74) | 36–9–6 |
| 52 | W | February 10, 1974 | 4–0 | Minnesota North Stars (1973–74) | 37–9–6 |
| 53 | W | February 13, 1974 | 9–6 | @ California Golden Seals (1973–74) | 38–9–6 |
| 54 | W | February 15, 1974 | 4–2 | @ Vancouver Canucks (1973–74) | 39–9–6 |
| 55 | W | February 16, 1974 | 5–2 | @ Los Angeles Kings (1973–74) | 40–9–6 |
| 56 | T | February 20, 1974 | 5–5 | @ Minnesota North Stars (1973–74) | 40–9–7 |
| 57 | W | February 23, 1974 | 6–2 | @ Pittsburgh Penguins (1973–74) | 41–9–7 |
| 58 | L | February 24, 1974 | 2–3 | @ Buffalo Sabres (1973–74) | 41–10–7 |
| 59 | W | February 28, 1974 | 8–1 | Detroit Red Wings (1973–74) | 42–10–7 |

March

| Game | Result | Date | Score | Opponent | Record |
|---|---|---|---|---|---|
| 60 | T | March 2, 1974 | 4–4 | @ Detroit Red Wings (1973–74) | 42–10–8 |
| 61 | L | March 3, 1974 | 4–6 | Toronto Maple Leafs (1973–74) | 42–11–8 |
| 62 | L | March 5, 1974 | 1–4 | @ Atlanta Flames (1973–74) | 42–12–8 |
| 63 | W | March 6, 1974 | 8–0 | @ St. Louis Blues (1973–74) | 43–12–8 |
| 64 | T | March 9, 1974 | 4–4 | @ Los Angeles Kings (1973–74) | 43–12–9 |
| 65 | L | March 10, 1974 | 2–6 | @ California Golden Seals (1973–74) | 43–13–9 |
| 66 | W | March 12, 1974 | 4–0 | Buffalo Sabres (1973–74) | 44–13–9 |
| 67 | W | March 14, 1974 | 4–3 | @ Buffalo Sabres (1973–74) | 45–13–9 |
| 68 | W | March 16, 1974 | 5–2 | @ Toronto Maple Leafs (1973–74) | 46–13–9 |
| 69 | W | March 17, 1974 | 5–2 | New York Rangers (1973–74) | 47–13–9 |
| 70 | W | March 21, 1974 | 7–0 | St. Louis Blues (1973–74) | 48–13–9 |
| 71 | L | March 23, 1974 | 3–4 | Atlanta Flames (1973–74) | 48–14–9 |
| 72 | W | March 24, 1974 | 6–3 | Montreal Canadiens (1973–74) | 49–14–9 |
| 73 | W | March 27, 1974 | 3–2 | @ New York Rangers (1973–74) | 50–14–9 |
| 74 | L | March 30, 1974 | 3–5 | @ Philadelphia Flyers (1973–74) | 50–15–9 |
| 75 | W | March 31, 1974 | 6–1 | Detroit Red Wings (1973–74) | 51–15–9 |

April

| Game | Result | Date | Score | Opponent | Record |
|---|---|---|---|---|---|
| 76 | L | April 3, 1974 | 2–6 | @ Chicago Black Hawks (1973–74) | 51–16–9 |
| 77 | L | April 6, 1974 | 2–6 | @ Montreal Canadiens (1973–74) | 51–17–9 |
| 78 | W | April 7, 1974 | 6–4 | Toronto Maple Leafs (1973–74) | 52–17–9 |

Legend: Win (2 points) Loss (0 points) Tie (1 point)

=== Notable games ===
- January 24: Bobby Orr is ejected by referee Wally Harris for arguing that he was tripped by Chicago's Bill White. The ejection draws a heated response from Harry Sinden and the Boston Garden crowd. They lost to the Black Hawks 2-1.

== Playoffs ==
=== Quarterfinals ===
Boston Bruins vs. Toronto Maple Leafs
| Date | Visitors | Score | Home | Score | Notes |
|---|---|---|---|---|---|
| April 10 | Toronto | 0 | Boston | 1 | |
| April 11 | Toronto | 3 | Boston | 6 | |
| April 13 | Boston | 6 | Toronto | 3 | |
| April 14 | Boston | 4 | Toronto | 3 | OT |

=== Semifinals ===
Boston Bruins vs. Chicago Blackhawks
| Date | Visitors | Score | Home | Score | Notes |
|---|---|---|---|---|---|
| April 18 | Chicago | 4 | Boston | 2 | |
| April 21 | Chicago | 6 | Boston | 8 | |
| April 23 | Boston | 3 | Chicago | 4 | OT |
| April 25 | Boston | 5 | Chicago | 2 | |
| April 28 | Chicago | 2 | Boston | 6 | |
| April 30 | Boston | 4 | Chicago | 2 | |

=== Stanley Cup Finals ===
The Bruins returned to the Stanley Cup, but were defeated by the Flyers in six games.

Boston Bruins vs. Philadelphia Flyers
| Date | Visitors | Score | Home | Score | Notes |
|---|---|---|---|---|---|
| May 7 | Philadelphia | 2 | Boston | 3 | |
| May 9 | Philadelphia | 3 | Boston | 2 | OT |
| May 12 | Boston | 1 | Philadelphia | 4 | |
| May 14 | Boston | 2 | Philadelphia | 4 | |
| May 16 | Philadelphia | 1 | Boston | 5 | |
| May 19 | Boston | 0 | Philadelphia | 1 | |

== Player statistics ==
=== Regular season ===
Scoring

| = Indicates league leader |

| Player | Pos | GP | G | A | Pts | PIM | +/- | PPG | SHG | GWG |
|---|---|---|---|---|---|---|---|---|---|---|
| Phil Esposito | C | 78 | 68 | 77 | 145 | 58 | 51 | 14 | 4 | 9 |
| Bobby Orr | D | 74 | 32 | 90 | 122 | 82 | 84 | 11 | 0 | 4 |
| Ken Hodge | RW | 76 | 50 | 55 | 105 | 43 | 40 | 15 | 0 | 11 |
| Wayne Cashman | LW | 78 | 30 | 59 | 89 | 111 | 49 | 5 | 2 | 2 |
| John Bucyk | LW | 76 | 31 | 44 | 75 | 8 | 13 | 12 | 0 | 9 |
| Carol Vadnais | D | 78 | 16 | 43 | 59 | 123 | 35 | 6 | 0 | 1 |
| Don Marcotte | LW | 78 | 24 | 26 | 50 | 18 | 44 | 0 | 3 | 3 |
| Gregg Sheppard | C | 75 | 16 | 31 | 47 | 21 | 23 | 0 | 3 | 3 |
| Terry O'Reilly | RW | 76 | 11 | 24 | 35 | 94 | 30 | 0 | 0 | 1 |
| Andre Savard | C | 72 | 16 | 14 | 30 | 39 | 16 | 0 | 0 | 1 |
| Dallas Smith | D | 77 | 6 | 21 | 27 | 64 | 26 | 0 | 0 | 0 |
| Dave Forbes | LW | 63 | 10 | 16 | 26 | 41 | 9 | 0 | 0 | 1 |
| Chris Oddleifson | C | 49 | 10 | 11 | 21 | 25 | 16 | 0 | 0 | 1 |
| Derek Sanderson | C | 29 | 8 | 12 | 20 | 48 | 17 | 0 | 0 | 1 |
| Bobby Schmautz | RW | 27 | 7 | 13 | 20 | 31 | 6 | 1 | 0 | 1 |
| Fred O'Donnell | RW | 43 | 5 | 7 | 12 | 43 | 3 | 0 | 0 | 1 |
| Al Sims | D | 76 | 3 | 9 | 12 | 22 | 64 | 0 | 0 | 1 |
| Darryl Edestrand | D | 52 | 3 | 8 | 11 | 20 | 19 | 1 | 0 | 2 |
| Rich LeDuc | C | 28 | 3 | 3 | 6 | 12 | 3 | 0 | 0 | 0 |
| Gary Doak | D | 69 | 0 | 4 | 4 | 44 | −2 | 0 | 0 | 0 |
| Ken Broderick | G | 5 | 0 | 1 | 1 | 0 | 0 | 0 | 0 | 0 |
| Gilles Gilbert | G | 54 | 0 | 1 | 1 | 9 | 0 | 0 | 0 | 0 |
| Doug Roberts | RW | 7 | 0 | 1 | 1 | 2 | 2 | 0 | 0 | 0 |
| Nick Beverley | D | 1 | 0 | 0 | 0 | 0 | −1 | 0 | 0 | 0 |
| Ross Brooks | G | 21 | 0 | 0 | 0 | 2 | 0 | 0 | 0 | 0 |
| Doug Gibson | C | 2 | 0 | 0 | 0 | 0 | −1 | 0 | 0 | 0 |
| Bob Gryp | LW | 1 | 0 | 0 | 0 | 0 | −2 | 0 | 0 | 0 |
| Dave Hynes | LW | 3 | 0 | 0 | 0 | 0 | 0 | 0 | 0 | 0 |
| Al Simmons | D | 3 | 0 | 0 | 0 | 0 | −1 | 0 | 0 | 0 |

Goaltending

| Player | MIN | GP | W | L | T | GA | GAA | SO |
|---|---|---|---|---|---|---|---|---|
| Gilles Gilbert | 3210 | 54 | 34 | 12 | 8 | 158 | 2.95 | 6 |
| Ross Brooks | 1170 | 21 | 16 | 3 | 0 | 46 | 2.36 | 3 |
| Ken Broderick | 300 | 5 | 2 | 2 | 1 | 16 | 3.20 | 0 |
| Team: | 4680 | 78 | 52 | 17 | 9 | 220 | 2.82 | 9 |

=== Playoffs ===
Scoring

| Player | Pos | GP | G | A | Pts | PIM | PPG | SHG | GWG |
|---|---|---|---|---|---|---|---|---|---|
| Gregg Sheppard | C | 16 | 11 | 8 | 19 | 4 | 0 | 2 | 2 |
| John Bucyk | LW | 16 | 8 | 10 | 18 | 4 | 3 | 0 | 1 |
| Bobby Orr | D | 16 | 4 | 14 | 18 | 28 | 1 | 0 | 2 |
| Ken Hodge | RW | 16 | 6 | 10 | 16 | 16 | 2 | 0 | 1 |
| Phil Esposito | C | 16 | 9 | 5 | 14 | 25 | 4 | 0 | 2 |
| Wayne Cashman | LW | 16 | 5 | 9 | 14 | 46 | 1 | 0 | 1 |
| Carol Vadnais | D | 16 | 1 | 12 | 13 | 42 | 1 | 0 | 0 |
| Bobby Schmautz | RW | 16 | 3 | 6 | 9 | 44 | 0 | 0 | 0 |
| Dallas Smith | D | 16 | 1 | 7 | 8 | 20 | 0 | 0 | 0 |
| Terry O'Reilly | RW | 16 | 2 | 5 | 7 | 38 | 0 | 0 | 0 |
| Don Marcotte | LW | 16 | 4 | 2 | 6 | 8 | 0 | 0 | 1 |
| Andre Savard | C | 16 | 3 | 2 | 5 | 24 | 0 | 0 | 0 |
| Darryl Edestrand | D | 16 | 1 | 2 | 3 | 15 | 0 | 0 | 0 |
| Gilles Gilbert | G | 16 | 0 | 3 | 3 | 8 | 0 | 0 | 0 |
| Dave Forbes | LW | 16 | 0 | 2 | 2 | 6 | 0 | 0 | 0 |
| Doug Gibson | C | 1 | 0 | 0 | 0 | 0 | 0 | 0 | 0 |
| Rich LeDuc | C | 5 | 0 | 0 | 0 | 9 | 0 | 0 | 0 |
| Al Simmons | D | 1 | 0 | 0 | 0 | 0 | 0 | 0 | 0 |
| Al Sims | D | 16 | 0 | 0 | 0 | 12 | 0 | 0 | 0 |

Goaltending

| Player | MIN | GP | W | L | GA | GAA | SO |
|---|---|---|---|---|---|---|---|
| Gilles Gilbert | 977 | 16 | 10 | 6 | 43 | 2.64 | 1 |
| Team: | 977 | 16 | 10 | 6 | 43 | 2.64 | 1 |

Note:

Pos = Position;GP = Games played; G = Goals; A = Assists; Pts = Points; PIM = Penalty minutes; +/- = Plus/minus; PPG = Power-play goals; SHG = Short-handed goals; GWG = Game-winning goals
Pos = Position;GP = Games played; Min, TOI = Minutes played; W = Wins; L = Losses; T,T/OT = Ties; OTL = Overtime losses; GA = Goals-against; GAA = Goals-against average; SO = Shutouts; SA = Shots against; SV = Shots saved;SV% = Save percentage;

== Awards and records ==
- Prince of Wales Trophy
- Phil Esposito, Art Ross Trophy winner
- Phil Esposito, Hart Memorial Trophy winner
- Phil Esposito, NHL leader, goals (68)
- Phil Esposito, NHL leader, points (145)
- Bobby Orr, Norris Trophy
- Bobby Orr, NHL leader, assists (90)
- Single-game record for points in one game: (7) on November 15, 1973, by Bobby Orr

== See also ==
- 1974 Stanley Cup Finals
