= 1973–74 St. Louis Blues season =

National Hockey League team season

1973–74 St. Louis Blues
- Division: 6th West
- 1973–74 record: 26–40–12
- Home record: 16–16–7
- Road record: 10–24–5
- Goals for: 206
- Goals against: 248

Team information
- General manager: Charles Catto
- Coach: Jean-Guy Talbot, Lou Angotti
- Captain: Barclay Plager
- Alternate captains: Bob Plager; Garry Unger; Gary Sabourin
- Arena: St. Louis Arena

Team leaders
- Goals: Garry Unger (33)
- Assists: Garry Unger (35)
- Points: Garry Unger (68)
- Penalty minutes: Steve Durbano (146)
- Wins: John Davidson (13); Wayne Stephenson (13)
- Goals against average: John Davidson (3.08)

The 1973–74 St. Louis Blues season was the seventh for the franchise in St. Louis, Missouri. The Blues finished the season with a record of 26 wins, 40 losses and 12 ties for 64 points, placing them in sixth place. The Blues missed the playoffs for the first time in franchise history, ending a six-season playoff streak.

== Regular season ==
=== Final standings ===
West Division
		GP	W	L	T	GF	GA	DIFF	Pts
1	Philadelphia Flyers	78	50	16	12	273	164	+109	112
2	Chicago Black Hawks	78	41	14	23	272	164	+108	105
3	Los Angeles Kings	78	33	33	12	233	231	+2	78
4	Atlanta Flames	78	30	34	14	214	238	−24	74
5	Pittsburgh Penguins	78	28	41	9	242	273	−31	65
6	St. Louis Blues	78	26	40	12	206	248	−42	64
7	Minnesota North Stars	78	23	38	17	235	275	−40	63
8	California Golden Seals	78	13	55	10	195	342	−147	36

=== Record vs. opponents ===
==== Vs. West Division ====
1973–74 NHL records
Team	ATL	CAL	CHI	LAK	MIN	PHI	PIT	STL	Total
Atlanta	—	4–0–1	1–2–2	1–5	3–2	2–2–2	1–3–2	1–3–1	13–17–8
California	0–4–1	—	1–3–2	1–4	1–3–2	0–5	1–4	2–3–1	6–26–6
Chicago	2–1–2	3–1–2	—	3–1–2	3–1–1	2–2–1	5–1	3–0–2	21–7–10
Los Angeles	5–1	4–1	1–3–2	—	2–3–1	2–2–1	4–1	3–2	21–13–4
Minnesota	2–3	3–1–2	1–3–1	3–2–1	—	0–4–2	2–2–1	3–1–1	14–16–8
Philadelphia	2–2–2	5–0	2–2–1	2–2–1	4–0–2	—	3–2	6–0	24–8–6
Pittsburgh	3–1–2	4–1	1–5	1–4	2–2–1	2–3	—	2–3–1	15–19–4
St. Louis	3–1–1	3–2–1	0–3–2	2–3	1–3–1	0–6	3–2–1	—	12–20–6

==== Vs. East Division ====
1973–74 NHL records
Team	BOS	BUF	DET	MTL	NYI	NYR	TOR	VAN	Total
Atlanta	3–2	3–1–1	3–1–1	3–2	1–3–1	1–2–2	0–4–1	3–2	17–17–6
California	1–4	2–3	1–4	1–3–1	1–2–2	0–5	0–4–1	1–4	7–29–4
Chicago	2–0–3	0–2–3	4–0–1	2–2–1	2–1–2	3–1–1	3–1–1	4–0–1	20–7–13
Los Angeles	1–3–1	1–4	1–3–1	1–3–1	3–1–1	1–2–2	1–2–2	3–2	12–20–8
Minnesota	0–3–2	1–3–1	1–2–2	1–4	1–3–1	0–4–1	1–3–1	4–0–1	9–22–9
Philadelphia	1–3–1	5–0	5–0	2–2–1	5–0	1–2–2	4–0–1	3–1–1	26–8–6
Pittsburgh	0–5	3–2	2–2–1	0–4–1	2–1–2	1–4	1–3–1	4–1	13–22–5
St. Louis	1–4	2–2–1	1–3–1	2–3	2–2–1	1–3–1	2–2–1	3–1–1	14–20–6

== Schedule and results ==
1973–74 regular season
October

Game	Result	Date	Score	Opponent	Record
1	L	October 10, 1973	1–2	@ California Golden Seals (1973–74)	0–1–0
2	L	October 13, 1973	0–1	Atlanta Flames (1973–74)	0–2–0
3	W	October 16, 1973	3–2	@ Detroit Red Wings (1973–74)	1–2–0
4	L	October 17, 1973	0–4	@ New York Rangers (1973–74)	1–3–0
5	T	October 20, 1973	4–4	@ Minnesota North Stars (1973–74)	1–3–1
6	W	October 23, 1973	3–2	Boston Bruins (1973–74)	2–3–1
7	T	October 27, 1973	4–4	Chicago Black Hawks (1973–74)	2–3–2
8	L	October 30, 1973	2–3	Los Angeles Kings (1973–74)	2–4–2

November

Game	Result	Date	Score	Opponent	Record
9	W	November 2, 1973	3–1	@ Vancouver Canucks (1973–74)	3–4–2
10	W	November 3, 1973	4–3	@ Los Angeles Kings (1973–74)	4–4–2
11	T	November 7, 1973	2–2	@ Atlanta Flames (1973–74)	4–4–3
12	W	November 10, 1973	5–0	@ Montreal Canadiens (1973–74)	5–4–3
13	L	November 11, 1973	3–4	@ Philadelphia Flyers (1973–74)	5–5–3
14	W	November 13, 1973	6–1	Vancouver Canucks (1973–74)	6–5–3
15	W	November 15, 1973	5–3	Pittsburgh Penguins (1973–74)	7–5–3
16	W	November 17, 1973	4–0	New York Islanders (1973–74)	8–5–3
17	L	November 21, 1973	1–4	@ Chicago Black Hawks (1973–74)	8–6–3
18	W	November 22, 1973	2–1	Minnesota North Stars (1973–74)	9–6–3
19	L	November 24, 1973	0–1	Philadelphia Flyers (1973–74)	9–7–3
20	T	November 27, 1973	2–2	Vancouver Canucks (1973–74)	9–7–4
21	L	November 29, 1973	1–5	@ Toronto Maple Leafs (1973–74)	9–8–4

December

Game	Result	Date	Score	Opponent	Record
22	T	December 1, 1973	4–4	New York Rangers (1973–74)	9–8–5
23	W	December 4, 1973	3–1	@ New York Islanders (1973–74)	10–8–5
24	L	December 5, 1973	1–5	@ New York Rangers (1973–74)	10–9–5
25	T	December 7, 1973	1–1	Detroit Red Wings (1973–74)	10–9–6
26	W	December 11, 1973	7–3	Toronto Maple Leafs (1973–74)	11–9–6
27	L	December 13, 1973	3–7	@ Detroit Red Wings (1973–74)	11–10–6
28	W	December 16, 1973	5–2	@ Buffalo Sabres (1973–74)	12–10–6
29	W	December 19, 1973	3–1	Los Angeles Kings (1973–74)	13–10–6
30	W	December 21, 1973	2–1	@ Atlanta Flames (1973–74)	14–10–6
31	L	December 22, 1973	2–4	New York Islanders (1973–74)	14–11–6
32	W	December 28, 1973	3–1	@ Pittsburgh Penguins (1973–74)	15–11–6
33	L	December 29, 1973	1–4	Philadelphia Flyers (1973–74)	15–12–6

January

Game	Result	Date	Score	Opponent	Record
34	W	January 2, 1974	8–4	Montreal Canadiens (1973–74)	16–12–6
35	W	January 5, 1974	4–1	California Golden Seals (1973–74)	17–12–6
36	W	January 8, 1974	3–1	@ Vancouver Canucks (1973–74)	18–12–6
37	L	January 9, 1974	6–8	@ California Golden Seals (1973–74)	18–13–6
38	L	January 12, 1974	2–4	@ Toronto Maple Leafs (1973–74)	18–14–6
39	L	January 13, 1974	0–1	@ Buffalo Sabres (1973–74)	18–15–6
40	L	January 15, 1974	3–5	Minnesota North Stars (1973–74)	18–16–6
41	W	January 17, 1974	3–2	New York Rangers (1973–74)	19–16–6
42	L	January 19, 1974	2–5	Detroit Red Wings (1973–74)	19–17–6
43	W	January 20, 1974	3–1	@ Atlanta Flames (1973–74)	20–17–6
44	L	January 22, 1974	0–1	Boston Bruins (1973–74)	20–18–6
45	L	January 23, 1974	1–4	@ Pittsburgh Penguins (1973–74)	20–19–6
46	T	January 26, 1974	3–3	Toronto Maple Leafs (1973–74)	20–19–7
47	W	January 30, 1974	6–4	California Golden Seals (1973–74)	21–19–7

February

Game	Result	Date	Score	Opponent	Record
48	W	February 2, 1974	6–1	Buffalo Sabres (1973–74)	22–19–7
49	L	February 3, 1974	0–3	@ Chicago Black Hawks (1973–74)	22–20–7
50	L	February 5, 1974	2–3	Montreal Canadiens (1973–74)	22–21–7
51	L	February 7, 1974	3–5	@ Boston Bruins (1973–74)	22–22–7
52	L	February 9, 1974	1–2	Los Angeles Kings (1973–74)	22–23–7
53	L	February 10, 1974	2–4	@ New York Rangers (1973–74)	22–24–7
54	L	February 12, 1974	2–3	Vancouver Canucks (1973–74)	22–25–7
55	T	February 14, 1974	2–2	New York Islanders (1973–74)	22–25–8
56	L	February 16, 1974	2–4	Minnesota North Stars (1973–74)	22–26–8
57	W	February 19, 1974	7–1	Atlanta Flames (1973–74)	23–26–8
58	T	February 20, 1974	1–1	@ Pittsburgh Penguins (1973–74)	23–26–9
59	L	February 23, 1974	3–5	@ Detroit Red Wings (1973–74)	23–27–9
60	L	February 24, 1974	2–3	@ Montreal Canadiens (1973–74)	23–28–9
61	T	February 27, 1974	2–2	@ California Golden Seals (1973–74)	23–28–10

March

Game	Result	Date	Score	Opponent	Record
62	L	March 2, 1974	2–4	@ Los Angeles Kings (1973–74)	23–29–10
63	L	March 6, 1974	0–8	Boston Bruins (1973–74)	23–30–10
64	L	March 9, 1974	5–7	Pittsburgh Penguins (1973–74)	23–31–10
65	L	March 10, 1974	1–8	@ Minnesota North Stars (1973–74)	23–32–10
66	W	March 12, 1974	2–1	Toronto Maple Leafs (1973–74)	24–32–10
67	L	March 14, 1974	2–4	@ Philadelphia Flyers (1973–74)	24–33–10
68	T	March 16, 1974	2–2	Buffalo Sabres (1973–74)	24–33–11
69	L	March 19, 1974	1–5	@ New York Islanders (1973–74)	24–34–11
70	L	March 21, 1974	0–7	@ Boston Bruins (1973–74)	24–35–11
71	L	March 23, 1974	3–7	@ Montreal Canadiens (1973–74)	24–36–11
72	L	March 24, 1974	1–4	@ Philadelphia Flyers (1973–74)	24–37–11
73	L	March 27, 1974	2–6	Philadelphia Flyers (1973–74)	24–38–11
74	W	March 30, 1974	4–3	Pittsburgh Penguins (1973–74)	25–38–11
75	T	March 31, 1974	2–2	@ Chicago Black Hawks (1973–74)	25–38–12

April

Game	Result	Date	Score	Opponent	Record
76	W	April 2, 1974	5–3	California Golden Seals (1973–74)	26–38–12
77	L	April 6, 1974	3–6	Chicago Black Hawks (1973–74)	26–39–12
78	L	April 7, 1974	2–5	@ Buffalo Sabres (1973–74)	26–40–12

Legend: Win (2 points) Loss (0 points) Tie (1 point)

== Player statistics ==
=== Regular season ===
Scoring

Player	Pos	GP	G	A	Pts	PIM	+/-	PPG	SHG	GWG
Garry Unger	C	78	33	35	68	96	−17	9	1	4
Pierre Plante	RW	78	26	28	54	85	−14	8	0	3
Glen Sather	LW	69	15	29	44	82	−9	4	0	5
Wayne Merrick	C	64	20	23	43	32	−11	2	0	4
Lou Angotti	C/RW	51	12	23	35	9	−3	1	0	5
Floyd Thomson	LW	77	11	22	33	58	−19	0	0	1
Gary Sabourin	RW	54	7	23	30	27	−9	1	0	0
Barclay Plager	D	72	6	20	26	99	−11	1	0	0
Larry Giroux	D	74	5	17	22	59	−14	2	0	1
Don Awrey	D	75	5	16	21	51	−7	1	0	0
Greg Polis	LW	37	8	12	20	24	−7	3	0	0
Nick Harbaruk	RW	56	5	14	19	16	4	0	1	1
Bob Kelly	LW	37	9	8	17	45	1	2	0	0
Gord Brooks	RW	30	6	8	14	12	0	0	0	1
Bob Plager	D	61	3	10	13	48	9	0	1	1
Butch Williams	RW	31	3	10	13	6	2	0	0	0
Ab DeMarco Jr.	D	23	3	9	12	11	6	1	0	0
Chris Evans	D	54	4	7	11	8	5	0	1	0
Garnet Bailey	LW	22	7	3	10	20	−1	0	0	0
Steve Durbano	D	36	4	5	9	146	−1	2	0	0
John Wright	C	32	3	6	9	22	−1	0	0	0
Dave Gardner	C	15	5	2	7	6	−6	1	0	0
Bill Collins	RW	12	2	2	4	14	−10	0	0	0
Bob Collyard	C	10	1	3	4	4	1	0	0	0
Ted Harris	D	24	0	4	4	16	−2	0	0	0
Bob Gassoff	D	28	0	3	3	84	−16	0	0	0
Jean Hamel	D	23	1	1	2	6	−3	0	0	0
Phil Roberto	RW	15	1	1	2	10	−4	0	0	0
Mike Lampman	LW	15	1	0	1	0	1	1	0	0
Jack Egers	RW	6	0	1	1	6	1	0	0	0
Wayne Stephenson	G	40	0	1	1	2	0	0	0	0
Bryan Watson	D	11	0	1	1	19	0	0	0	0
John Davidson	G	39	0	0	0	10	0	0	0	0
Connie Forey	LW	4	0	0	0	2	−1	0	0	0
Brent Hughes	D	2	0	0	0	0	0	0	0	0
Bernie MacNeil	LW	4	0	0	0	0	1	0	0	0
Glenn Patrick	D	1	0	0	0	2	−1	0	0	0
Frank Spring	RW	2	0	0	0	0	0	0	0	0
Jim Watt	G	1	0	0	0	0	0	0	0	0
John Wensink	LW	3	0	0	0	0	0	0	0	0

Goaltending

Player	MIN	GP	W	L	T	GA	GAA	SO
John Davidson	2300	39	13	19	7	118	3.08	0
Wayne Stephenson	2360	40	13	21	5	123	3.13	2
Jim Watt	20	1	0	0	0	2	6.00	0
Team:	4680	78	26	40	12	243	3.12	2

Note:

Pos = Position;GP = Games played; G = Goals; A = Assists; Pts = Points; PIM = Penalty minutes; +/- = Plus/minus; PPG = Power-play goals; SHG = Short-handed goals; GWG = Game-winning goals
Pos = Position;GP = Games played; Min, TOI = Minutes played; W = Wins; L = Losses; T,T/OT = Ties; OTL = Overtime losses; GA = Goals-against; GAA = Goals-against average; SO = Shutouts; SA = Shots against; SV = Shots saved;SV% = Save percentage;

== Draft picks ==
St. Louis's draft picks at the 1973 NHL amateur draft held at the Queen Elizabeth Hotel in Montreal.

Round	#	Player	Nationality	College/Junior/Club team (League)
1	5	John Davidson	Canada	Calgary Centennials (WCHL)
2	24	George Pesut	Canada	Saskatoon Blades (WCHL)
3	48	Bob Gassoff	Canada	Medicine Hat Tigers (WCHL)
5	72	Bill Laing	Canada	Saskatoon Blades (WCHL)
6	88	Randy Smith	Canada	Edmonton Oil Kings (WCHL)
7	104	John Wensink	Canada	Cornwall Royals (QMJHL)
8	120	Jean Tetreault	Canada	Drummondville Rangers (QMJHL)

== See also ==
- 1973–74 NHL season
