= 1973–74 Toronto Maple Leafs season =

NHL hockey team season

1973–74 Toronto Maple Leafs
- Division: 4th East
- 1973–74 record: 35–27–16
- Home record: 21–11–7
- Road record: 14–16–9
- Goals for: 274
- Goals against: 230

Team information
- General manager: Jim Gregory
- Coach: Red Kelly
- Captain: Dave Keon
- Arena: Maple Leaf Gardens

Team leaders
- Goals: Darryl Sittler (38)
- Assists: Norm Ullman (47)
- Points: Darry Sittler (84)
- Penalty minutes: Brian Glennie (100)
- Wins: Doug Favell (14)
- Goals against average: Doug Favell (2.71)

The 1973–74 Toronto Maple Leafs season was the 57th season of the Toronto NHL franchise, 47th as the Maple Leafs. The Leafs placed fourth to make the playoffs after missing the prior year, but were swept in the first round by the Boston Bruins.

== Offseason ==
The Maple Leafs made several signings that would improve their team. At the entry draft, the Maple Leafs chose Lanny McDonald with the fourth-overall draft pick. He would play six and a half seasons with the Maple Leafs. Bernie Parent, who had left the team for the World Hockey Association (WHA) in 1972, made it known that he wanted to return to the NHL. The Maple Leafs still had his NHL rights, and they traded Parent to the Philadelphia Flyers for Doug Favell and a first-round draft pick, which the Maple Leafs used to choose Bob Neely. Neely would play four seasons for the Maple Leafs before being traded to the Colorado Rockies.

In a first for Toronto, the club signed players from Europe. Toronto signed Swedish defenceman Borje Salming and forward Inge Hammarstrom. Salming had made the all-star team at the 1973 world championships. Hammarstrom was one of the top scorers in Sweden. Both had played for Brynäs of the Swedish League, and the Leafs had to pay the Swedish Ice Hockey Federation for their release. Salming would play with the Leafs until 1989, when he joined the Detroit Red Wings. Hammarstrom would play five seasons in Toronto before moving to the St. Louis Blues.

== Regular season ==
=== Final standings ===
East Division
		GP	W	L	T	GF	GA	DIFF	Pts
1	Boston Bruins	78	52	17	9	349	221	+128	113
2	Montreal Canadiens	78	45	24	9	293	240	+53	99
3	New York Rangers	78	40	24	14	300	251	+49	94
4	Toronto Maple Leafs	78	35	27	16	274	230	+44	86
5	Buffalo Sabres	78	32	34	12	242	250	−8	76
6	Detroit Red Wings	78	29	39	10	255	319	−64	68
7	Vancouver Canucks	78	24	43	11	224	296	−72	59
8	New York Islanders	78	19	41	18	182	247	−65	56

=== Record vs. opponents ===
==== Vs. East Division ====
1973–74 NHL records
Team	BOS	BUF	DET	MTL	NYI	NYR	TOR	VAN	Total
Boston	—	4–1	4–1–1	4–2	4–1	4–1	4–2	4–0–1	28–8–2
Buffalo	1–4	—	5–1	0–3–2	3–0–2	2–2–1	2–3–1	2–4	15–17–6
Detroit	1–4–1	1–5	—	2–3	4–1	2–3–1	2–2–1	2–3	14–21–3
Montreal	2–4	3–0–2	3–2	—	4–1–1	4–2	2–3	4–0–1	22–12–4
N.Y. Islanders	1–4	0–3–2	1–4	1–4–1	—	1–4	0–4–2	2–1–3	6–24–8
N.Y. Rangers	1–4	2–2–1	3–2–1	2–4	4–1	—	1–2–2	4–1–1	17–16–5
Toronto	2–4	3–2–1	2–2–1	3–2	4–0–2	2–1–2	—	0–4–1	16–15–7
Vancouver	0–4–1	4–2	3–2	0–4–1	1–2–3	1–4–1	4–0–1	—	13–18–7

==== Vs. West Division ====
1973–74 NHL records
Team	ATL	CAL	CHI	LAK	MIN	PHI	PIT	STL	Total
Boston	2–3	4–1	0–2–3	3–1–1	3–0–2	3–1–1	5–0	4–1	24–9–7
Buffalo	1–3–1	3–2	2–0–3	4–1	3–1–1	0–5	2–3	2–2–1	17–17–6
Detroit	1–3–1	4–1	0–4–1	3–1–1	2–1–2	0–5	2–2–1	3–1–1	15–18–7
Montreal	2–3	3–1–1	2–2–1	3–1–1	4–1	2–2–1	4–0–1	3–2	23–12–5
N.Y. Islanders	3–1–1	2–1–2	1–2–2	1–3–1	3–1–1	0–5	1–2–2	2–2–1	13–17–10
N.Y. Rangers	2–1–2	5–0	1–3–1	2–1–2	4–0–1	2–1–2	4–1	3–1–1	23–8–9
Toronto	4–0–1	4–0–1	1–3–1	2–1–2	3–1–1	0–4–1	3–1–1	2–2–1	19–12–9
Vancouver	2–3	4–1	0–4–1	2–3	0–4–1	1–3–1	1–4	1–3–1	11–25–4

== Schedule and results ==
1973–74 regular season
October

Game	Result	Date	Score	Opponent	Record
1	W	October 10, 1973	7–4	Buffalo Sabres (1973–74)	1–0–0
2	L	October 11, 1973	0–2	@ Philadelphia Flyers (1973–74)	1–1–0
3	W	October 13, 1973	6–3	Los Angeles Kings (1973–74)	2–1–0
4	W	October 17, 1973	5–3	@ Montreal Canadiens (1973–74)	3–1–0
5	W	October 20, 1973	3–2	New York Rangers (1973–74)	4–1–0
6	L	October 21, 1973	3–4	@ Buffalo Sabres (1973–74)	4–2–0
7	T	October 23, 1973	2–2	Minnesota North Stars (1973–74)	4–2–1
8	L	October 27, 1973	2–3	Boston Bruins (1973–74)	4–3–1
9	T	October 28, 1973	1–1	@ Chicago Black Hawks (1973–74)	4–3–2
10	W	October 30, 1973	7–0	Detroit Red Wings (1973–74)	5–3–2

November

Game	Result	Date	Score	Opponent	Record
11	T	November 1, 1973	2–2	@ New York Islanders (1973–74)	5–3–3
12	W	November 3, 1973	6–0	Pittsburgh Penguins (1973–74)	6–3–3
13	L	November 7, 1973	1–4	Montreal Canadiens (1973–74)	6–4–3
14	T	November 10, 1973	3–3	New York Islanders (1973–74)	6–4–4
15	L	November 11, 1973	4–5	@ Detroit Red Wings (1973–74)	6–5–4
16	W	November 14, 1973	4–1	@ California Golden Seals (1973–74)	7–5–4
17	T	November 16, 1973	3–3	@ Vancouver Canucks (1973–74)	7–5–5
18	W	November 17, 1973	4–3	@ Los Angeles Kings (1973–74)	8–5–5
19	W	November 20, 1973	4–2	@ New York Islanders (1973–74)	9–5–5
20	L	November 22, 1973	2–4	Pittsburgh Penguins (1973–74)	9–6–5
21	L	November 24, 1973	1–3	Chicago Black Hawks (1973–74)	9–7–5
22	W	November 28, 1973	4–3	@ Pittsburgh Penguins (1973–74)	10–7–5
23	W	November 29, 1973	5–1	St. Louis Blues (1973–74)	11–7–5

December

Game	Result	Date	Score	Opponent	Record
24	W	December 1, 1973	3–2	California Golden Seals (1973–74)	12–7–5
25	L	December 2, 1973	4–6	@ New York Rangers (1973–74)	12–8–5
26	W	December 6, 1973	4–1	@ Minnesota North Stars (1973–74)	13–8–5
27	L	December 8, 1973	1–3	Philadelphia Flyers (1973–74)	13–9–5
28	L	December 9, 1973	2–5	@ Buffalo Sabres (1973–74)	13–10–5
29	L	December 11, 1973	3–7	@ St. Louis Blues (1973–74)	13–11–5
30	W	December 13, 1973	6–1	@ Atlanta Flames (1973–74)	14–11–5
31	T	December 15, 1973	2–2	New York Rangers (1973–74)	14–11–6
32	W	December 19, 1973	5–3	California Golden Seals (1973–74)	15–11–6
33	L	December 22, 1973	4–6	Vancouver Canucks (1973–74)	15–12–6
34	L	December 23, 1973	3–4	@ Boston Bruins (1973–74)	15–13–6
35	W	December 26, 1973	9–2	Montreal Canadiens (1973–74)	16–13–6
36	T	December 29, 1973	3–3	Atlanta Flames (1973–74)	16–13–7
37	W	December 30, 1973	4–3	@ Chicago Black Hawks (1973–74)	17–13–7

January

Game	Result	Date	Score	Opponent	Record
38	W	January 2, 1974	4–3	Detroit Red Wings (1973–74)	18–13–7
39	L	January 5, 1974	3–5	@ Los Angeles Kings (1973–74)	18–14–7
40	W	January 7, 1974	6–2	Atlanta Flames (1973–74)	19–14–7
41	W	January 9, 1974	6–4	@ Pittsburgh Penguins (1973–74)	20–14–7
42	W	January 12, 1974	4–2	St. Louis Blues (1973–74)	21–14–7
43	L	January 15, 1974	2–4	@ Vancouver Canucks (1973–74)	21–15–7
44	T	January 16, 1974	5–5	@ California Golden Seals (1973–74)	21–15–8
45	L	January 19, 1974	3–5	@ Minnesota North Stars (1973–74)	21–16–8
46	L	January 23, 1974	3–4	@ Montreal Canadiens (1973–74)	21–17–8
47	T	January 26, 1974	3–3	@ St. Louis Blues (1973–74)	21–17–9
48	W	January 27, 1974	5–2	@ Atlanta Flames (1973–74)	22–17–9
49	W	January 31, 1974	3–1	Minnesota North Stars (1973–74)	23–17–9

February

Game	Result	Date	Score	Opponent	Record
50	W	February 2, 1974	6–2	Boston Bruins (1973–74)	24–17–9
51	T	February 3, 1974	3–3	@ Buffalo Sabres (1973–74)	24–17–10
52	T	February 6, 1974	2–2	Detroit Red Wings (1973–74)	24–17–11
53	W	February 9, 1974	4–1	Minnesota North Stars (1973–74)	25–17–11
54	L	February 13, 1974	1–3	Philadelphia Flyers (1973–74)	25–18–11
55	W	February 16, 1974	7–2	Atlanta Flames (1973–74)	26–18–11
56	L	February 17, 1974	1–4	@ Chicago Black Hawks (1973–74)	26–19–11
57	W	February 20, 1974	4–2	Buffalo Sabres (1973–74)	27–19–11
58	L	February 23, 1974	3–4	Vancouver Canucks (1973–74)	27–20–11
59	T	February 24, 1974	3–3	Los Angeles Kings (1973–74)	27–20–12
60	L	February 26, 1974	3–7	@ Detroit Red Wings (1973–74)	27–21–12
61	W	February 28, 1974	6–4	@ New York Islanders (1973–74)	28–21–12

March

Game	Result	Date	Score	Opponent	Record
62	W	March 2, 1974	5–2	New York Islanders (1973–74)	29–21–12
63	W	March 3, 1974	6–4	@ Boston Bruins (1973–74)	30–21–12
64	T	March 7, 1974	2–2	Pittsburgh Penguins (1973–74)	30–21–13
65	L	March 9, 1974	1–2	Philadelphia Flyers (1973–74)	30–22–13
66	L	March 12, 1974	1–2	@ St. Louis Blues (1973–74)	30–23–13
67	W	March 14, 1974	2–1	New York Islanders (1973–74)	31–23–13
68	L	March 16, 1974	2–5	Boston Bruins (1973–74)	31–24–13
69	T	March 17, 1974	2–2	@ Philadelphia Flyers (1973–74)	31–24–14
70	T	March 19, 1974	1–1	@ Los Angeles Kings (1973–74)	31–24–15
71	W	March 22, 1974	3–2	@ California Golden Seals (1973–74)	32–24–15
72	L	March 24, 1974	2–3	@ Vancouver Canucks (1973–74)	32–25–15
73	L	March 27, 1974	3–5	Chicago Black Hawks (1973–74)	32–26–15
74	W	March 30, 1974	7–3	New York Rangers (1973–74)	33–26–15
75	T	March 31, 1974	3–3	@ New York Rangers (1973–74)	33–26–16

April

Game	Result	Date	Score	Opponent	Record
76	W	April 3, 1974	5–3	@ Montreal Canadiens (1973–74)	34–26–16
77	W	April 6, 1974	3–1	Buffalo Sabres (1973–74)	35–26–16
78	L	April 7, 1974	4–6	@ Boston Bruins (1973–74)	35–27–16

Legend: Win (2 points) Loss (0 points) Tie (1 point)

== Player statistics ==
=== Regular season ===
Scoring

Player	Pos	GP	G	A	Pts	PIM	+/-	PPG	SHG	GWG
Darryl Sittler	C	78	38	46	84	55	12	11	0	6
Norm Ullman	C	78	22	47	69	12	10	4	0	2
Paul Henderson	RW	69	24	31	55	40	9	5	0	2
Dave Keon	C	74	25	28	53	7	13	1	2	3
Ron Ellis	RW	70	23	25	48	12	8	3	0	3
Inge Hammarstrom	LW	66	20	23	43	14	17	4	0	4
Jim McKenny	D	77	14	28	42	36	16	3	0	1
Rick Kehoe	RW	69	18	22	40	8	19	3	0	3
Borje Salming	D	76	5	34	39	48	38	3	0	0
Ian Turnbull	D	78	8	27	35	74	12	2	0	2
Mike Pelyk	D	71	12	19	31	94	5	0	0	1
Lanny McDonald	RW	70	14	16	30	43	3	2	0	3
Garry Monahan	LW	78	9	16	25	70	4	0	0	1
Tim Ecclestone	LW	46	9	14	23	32	8	1	2	1
Brian Glennie	D	65	4	18	22	100	27	1	1	0
Denis Dupere	LW	34	8	9	17	8	3	2	0	0
Eddie Shack	LW	59	7	8	15	74	1	4	0	1
Errol Thompson	LW	56	7	8	15	6	2	0	0	2
Bob Neely	LW	54	5	7	12	98	−14	2	0	0
Pierre Jarry	LW	12	2	8	10	10	8	0	0	0
George Ferguson	C	16	0	4	4	4	1	0	0	0
Willie Brossart	D	17	0	1	1	20	2	0	0	0
Doug Favell	G	32	0	0	0	20	0	0	0	0
Eddie Johnston	G	26	0	0	0	0	0	0	0	0
Dunc Wilson	G	24	0	0	0	6	0	0	0	0

Goaltending

Player	MIN	GP	W	L	T	GA	GAA	SO
Doug Favell	1752	32	14	7	9	79	2.71	0
Eddie Johnston	1516	26	12	9	4	78	3.09	1
Dunc Wilson	1412	24	9	11	3	68	2.89	1
Team:	4680	78	35	27	16	225	2.88	2

=== Playoffs ===
Scoring

Player	Pos	GP	G	A	Pts	PIM	PPG	SHG	GWG
Bob Neely	LW	4	1	3	4	0	0	0	0
Ron Ellis	RW	4	2	1	3	0	0	0	0
Darryl Sittler	C	4	2	1	3	6	1	0	0
Dave Keon	C	4	1	2	3	0	0	0	0
Norm Ullman	C	4	1	1	2	0	0	0	0
Paul Henderson	RW	4	0	2	2	2	0	0	0
Jim McKenny	D	4	0	2	2	0	0	0	0
Inge Hammarstrom	LW	4	1	0	1	0	0	0	0
Eddie Shack	LW	4	1	0	1	2	0	0	0
Tim Ecclestone	LW	4	0	1	1	0	0	0	0
George Ferguson	C	3	0	1	1	2	0	0	0
Garry Monahan	LW	4	0	1	1	7	0	0	0
Borje Salming	D	4	0	1	1	4	0	0	0
Errol Thompson	LW	2	0	1	1	0	0	0	0
Willie Brossart	D	1	0	0	0	0	0	0	0
Denis Dupere	LW	3	0	0	0	0	0	0	0
Doug Favell	G	3	0	0	0	0	0	0	0
Brian Glennie	D	3	0	0	0	10	0	0	0
Eddie Johnston	G	1	0	0	0	0	0	0	0
Mike Pelyk	D	4	0	0	0	4	0	0	0
Ian Turnbull	D	4	0	0	0	8	0	0	0

Goaltending

Player	MIN	GP	W	L	GA	GAA	SO
Doug Favell	181	3	0	3	10	3.31	0
Eddie Johnston	60	1	0	1	6	6.00	0
Team:	241	4	0	4	16	3.98	0

Note:

Pos = Position;GP = Games played; G = Goals; A = Assists; Pts = Points; PIM = Penalty minutes; +/- = Plus/minus; PPG = Power-play goals; SHG = Short-handed goals; GWG = Game-winning goals
Pos = Position;GP = Games played; Min, TOI = Minutes played; W = Wins; L = Losses; T,T/OT = Ties; OTL = Overtime losses; GA = Goals-against; GAA = Goals-against average; SO = Shutouts; SA = Shots against; SV = Shots saved;SV% = Save percentage;

== Transactions ==
The Maple Leafs have been involved in the following transactions during the 1973–74 season.

=== Trades ===
May 22, 1973	To Boston Bruins Future Considerations	To Toronto Maple Leafs Eddie Johnston
May 23, 1973	To Philadelphia Flyers Cash	To Toronto Maple Leafs Willie Brossart
May 29, 1973	To Vancouver Canucks Murray Heatley; Larry McIntyre	To Toronto Maple Leafs Dunc Wilson
July 3, 1973	To Pittsburgh Penguins Cash	To Toronto Maple Leafs Eddie Shack
October 17, 1973	To Detroit Red Wings Terry Clancy	To Toronto Maple Leafs Cash
November 29, 1973	To Detroit Red Wings Pierre Jarry	To Toronto Maple Leafs Tim Ecclestone
May 27, 1974	To Philadelphia Flyers Dave Fortier; Randy Osburn	To Toronto Maple Leafs Bill Flett
May 27, 1974	To St. Louis Blues Eddie Johnston	To Toronto Maple Leafs Gary Sabourin

=== Free agents ===
Player	Former team
Bill Butters	Undrafted Free Agent
Scott Garland	Tulsa Oilers (CHL)

== Draft picks ==
Toronto's draft picks at the 1973 NHL amateur draft held at the Queen Elizabeth Hotel in Montreal.

Round	#	Player	Nationality	College/Junior/Club team (League)
1	4	Lanny McDonald	Canada	Medicine Hat Tigers (WCHL)
1	10	Bob Neely	Canada	Peterborough Petes (OHA)
1	15	Ian Turnbull	Canada	Ottawa 67's (OHA)
4	52	Frank Rochon	Canada	Sherbrooke Castors (QMJHL)
5	68	Gord Titcomb	Canada	St. Catharines Black Hawks (OHA)
6	84	Doug Marit	Canada	Regina Pats (WCHL)
7	100	Dan Follet	Canada	Downsview Bombers (OPJHL)
8	116	Les Burgess	Canada	Kitchener Rangers (OHA)
9	132	Dave Pay	Canada	University of Wisconsin (NCAA)
10	144	Lee Palmer	Canada	Clarkson University (NCAA)
10	147	Bob Peace	Canada	Cornell University (NCAA)
11	159	Norm McLeod	Canada	Ottawa M&W Rangers (CJHL)

== See also ==
- 1973–74 NHL season
