= 1973–74 Los Angeles Kings season =

National Hockey League team season

1973–74 Los Angeles Kings
- Division: 3rd West
- 1973–74 record: 33–33–12
- Home record: 22–13–4
- Road record: 11–20–8
- Goals for: 233
- Goals against: 231

Team information
- General manager: Larry Regan (Oct–Dec); Jake Milford (Dec–Apr)
- Coach: Bob Pulford
- Captain: Terry Harper
- Alternate captains: Dan Maloney; Juha Widing
- Arena: Los Angeles Forum

Team leaders
- Goals: Butch Goring (28)
- Assists: Frank St. Marseille (36)
- Points: Frank St. Marseille (50)
- Penalty minutes: Mike Corrigan (150); Terry Harper (150)
- Wins: Rogie Vachon (28)
- Goals against average: Rogie Vachon (2.81)

The 1973–74 Los Angeles Kings season was the Kings' seventh season in the National Hockey League (NHL).

== Offseason ==
Forward Serge Bernier (22 goals, 46 assists) jumped to the Quebec Nordiques of the WHA.

== Regular season ==
After finishing strong in 1972–73 and barely missing the playoffs, the Kings had high hopes for the 1973–74 season. But the team started slowly and by the end of November, they were 5–14–3 and in last place. Then they made a blockbuster trade, sending their best defenseman Gilles Marotte to the New York Rangers for defenseman Sheldon Kannegiesser, forwards Mike Murphy, and Tom Williams, and speedy center Gene Carr. They improved a little, but were still 9 games under .500 at the end of February at 21–30–10 for 52 points and 7th place in the 8 team Western Division. The Kings then went 9–0–2 over the next 3 weeks and climbed into 3rd place, passing the Atlanta Flames, Minnesota North Stars, Pittsburgh Penguins, and St. Louis Blues. Going into the final game of the season, the Kings had clinched 3rd, but needed a win to finish .500 and needed to outscore the Vancouver Canucks by 8 goals to finish even in goal differential on the season, which was one of coach Bob Pulford's goals at the beginning of the season. Not only did the Kings win, they won 11–1 to finish .500 and with a plus goal differential for the first time in their history. The season also marked the debut of hall of fame broadcaster Bob Miller, who would broadcast Kings games until his retirement after the 2016–17 season.

=== Final standings ===
West Division
		GP	W	L	T	GF	GA	DIFF	Pts
1	Philadelphia Flyers	78	50	16	12	273	164	+109	112
2	Chicago Black Hawks	78	41	14	23	272	164	+108	105
3	Los Angeles Kings	78	33	33	12	233	231	+2	78
4	Atlanta Flames	78	30	34	14	214	238	−24	74
5	Pittsburgh Penguins	78	28	41	9	242	273	−31	65
6	St. Louis Blues	78	26	40	12	206	248	−42	64
7	Minnesota North Stars	78	23	38	17	235	275	−40	63
8	California Golden Seals	78	13	55	10	195	342	−147	36

=== Record vs. opponents ===
==== Vs. West Division ====
1973–74 NHL records
Team	ATL	CAL	CHI	LAK	MIN	PHI	PIT	STL	Total
Atlanta	—	4–0–1	1–2–2	1–5	3–2	2–2–2	1–3–2	1–3–1	13–17–8
California	0–4–1	—	1–3–2	1–4	1–3–2	0–5	1–4	2–3–1	6–26–6
Chicago	2–1–2	3–1–2	—	3–1–2	3–1–1	2–2–1	5–1	3–0–2	21–7–10
Los Angeles	5–1	4–1	1–3–2	—	2–3–1	2–2–1	4–1	3–2	21–13–4
Minnesota	2–3	3–1–2	1–3–1	3–2–1	—	0–4–2	2–2–1	3–1–1	14–16–8
Philadelphia	2–2–2	5–0	2–2–1	2–2–1	4–0–2	—	3–2	6–0	24–8–6
Pittsburgh	3–1–2	4–1	1–5	1–4	2–2–1	2–3	—	2–3–1	15–19–4
St. Louis	3–1–1	3–2–1	0–3–2	2–3	1–3–1	0–6	3–2–1	—	12–20–6

==== Vs. East Division ====
1973–74 NHL records
Team	BOS	BUF	DET	MTL	NYI	NYR	TOR	VAN	Total
Atlanta	3–2	3–1–1	3–1–1	3–2	1–3–1	1–2–2	0–4–1	3–2	17–17–6
California	1–4	2–3	1–4	1–3–1	1–2–2	0–5	0–4–1	1–4	7–29–4
Chicago	2–0–3	0–2–3	4–0–1	2–2–1	2–1–2	3–1–1	3–1–1	4–0–1	20–7–13
Los Angeles	1–3–1	1–4	1–3–1	1–3–1	3–1–1	1–2–2	1–2–2	3–2	12–20–8
Minnesota	0–3–2	1–3–1	1–2–2	1–4	1–3–1	0–4–1	1–3–1	4–0–1	9–22–9
Philadelphia	1–3–1	5–0	5–0	2–2–1	5–0	1–2–2	4–0–1	3–1–1	26–8–6
Pittsburgh	0–5	3–2	2–2–1	0–4–1	2–1–2	1–4	1–3–1	4–1	13–22–5
St. Louis	1–4	2–2–1	1–3–1	2–3	2–2–1	1–3–1	2–2–1	3–1–1	14–20–6

== Schedule and results ==
1973–74 regular season
October

Game	Result	Date	Score	Opponent	Record
1	L	October 10, 1973	0–3	Chicago Black Hawks (1973–74)	0–1–0
2	L	October 13, 1973	3–6	@ Toronto Maple Leafs (1973–74)	0–2–0
3	T	October 14, 1973	1–1	@ New York Rangers (1973–74)	0–2–1
4	T	October 16, 1973	4–4	@ New York Islanders (1973–74)	0–2–2
5	L	October 18, 1973	2–6	@ Buffalo Sabres (1973–74)	0–3–2
6	W	October 20, 1973	3–0	Philadelphia Flyers (1973–74)	1–3–2
7	W	October 24, 1973	6–4	Atlanta Flames (1973–74)	2–3–2
8	L	October 27, 1973	2–3	Detroit Red Wings (1973–74)	2–4–2
9	W	October 30, 1973	3–2	@ St. Louis Blues (1973–74)	3–4–2

November

Game	Result	Date	Score	Opponent	Record
10	W	November 1, 1973	2–1	New York Rangers (1973–74)	4–4–2
11	L	November 3, 1973	3–4	St. Louis Blues (1973–74)	4–5–2
12	L	November 7, 1973	2–5	@ Minnesota North Stars (1973–74)	4–6–2
13	W	November 8, 1973	3–2	@ Philadelphia Flyers (1973–74)	5–6–2
14	L	November 10, 1973	3–5	Buffalo Sabres (1973–74)	5–7–2
15	L	November 11, 1973	0–3	Chicago Black Hawks (1973–74)	5–8–2
16	L	November 14, 1973	4–5	Philadelphia Flyers (1973–74)	5–9–2
17	L	November 17, 1973	3–4	Toronto Maple Leafs (1973–74)	5–10–2
18	L	November 20, 1973	5–6	@ Detroit Red Wings (1973–74)	5–11–2
19	T	November 24, 1973	5–5	@ New York Rangers (1973–74)	5–11–3
20	L	November 25, 1973	1–3	@ Boston Bruins (1973–74)	5–12–3
21	L	November 28, 1973	3–5	@ Montreal Canadiens (1973–74)	5–13–3
22	L	November 29, 1973	1–2	@ Buffalo Sabres (1973–74)	5–14–3

December

Game	Result	Date	Score	Opponent	Record
23	T	December 1, 1973	1–1	Minnesota North Stars (1973–74)	5–14–4
24	W	December 4, 1973	3–2	@ Vancouver Canucks (1973–74)	6–14–4
25	W	December 5, 1973	4–1	Pittsburgh Penguins (1973–74)	7–14–4
26	W	December 8, 1973	3–0	Atlanta Flames (1973–74)	8–14–4
27	L	December 11, 1973	3–6	@ Minnesota North Stars (1973–74)	8–15–4
28	W	December 13, 1973	3–2	New York Islanders (1973–74)	9–15–4
29	L	December 15, 1973	2–6	Montreal Canadiens (1973–74)	9–16–4
30	T	December 18, 1973	4–4	@ Detroit Red Wings (1973–74)	9–16–5
31	L	December 19, 1973	1–3	@ St. Louis Blues (1973–74)	9–17–5
32	W	December 22, 1973	5–2	Minnesota North Stars (1973–74)	10–17–5
33	T	December 26, 1973	3–3	@ Chicago Black Hawks (1973–74)	10–17–6
34	L	December 27, 1973	4–6	@ Atlanta Flames (1973–74)	10–18–6
35	W	December 29, 1973	4–1	Boston Bruins (1973–74)	11–18–6

January

Game	Result	Date	Score	Opponent	Record
36	L	January 2, 1974	2–5	@ California Golden Seals (1973–74)	11–19–6
37	W	January 5, 1974	5–3	Toronto Maple Leafs (1973–74)	12–19–6
38	W	January 8, 1974	3–1	@ New York Islanders (1973–74)	13–19–6
39	T	January 9, 1974	4–4	@ Chicago Black Hawks (1973–74)	13–19–7
40	L	January 12, 1974	0–6	@ Detroit Red Wings (1973–74)	13–20–7
41	W	January 15, 1974	2–1	@ Montreal Canadiens (1973–74)	14–20–7
42	W	January 16, 1974	2–0	@ Pittsburgh Penguins (1973–74)	15–20–7
43	L	January 19, 1974	0–2	@ Philadelphia Flyers (1973–74)	15–21–7
44	L	January 20, 1974	2–5	@ Boston Bruins (1973–74)	15–22–7
45	W	January 23, 1974	3–1	Minnesota North Stars (1973–74)	16–22–7
46	T	January 24, 1974	4–4	Philadelphia Flyers (1973–74)	16–22–8
47	W	January 26, 1974	2–0	@ Pittsburgh Penguins (1973–74)	17–22–8
48	L	January 27, 1974	3–5	@ New York Rangers (1973–74)	17–23–8
49	L	January 31, 1974	2–4	New York Islanders (1973–74)	17–24–8

February

Game	Result	Date	Score	Opponent	Record
50	W	February 2, 1974	3–1	California Golden Seals (1973–74)	18–24–8
51	W	February 6, 1974	5–1	Buffalo Sabres (1973–74)	19–24–8
52	W	February 9, 1974	2–1	@ St. Louis Blues (1973–74)	20–24–8
53	W	February 10, 1974	6–3	@ Atlanta Flames (1973–74)	21–24–8
54	L	February 13, 1974	0–4	@ Chicago Black Hawks (1973–74)	21–25–8
55	L	February 14, 1974	2–4	@ Buffalo Sabres (1973–74)	21–26–8
56	L	February 16, 1974	2–5	Boston Bruins (1973–74)	21–27–8
57	L	February 19, 1974	3–4	Vancouver Canucks (1973–74)	21–28–8
58	L	February 21, 1974	3–5	New York Rangers (1973–74)	21–29–8
59	T	February 23, 1974	4–4	@ Montreal Canadiens (1973–74)	21–29–9
60	T	February 24, 1974	3–3	@ Toronto Maple Leafs (1973–74)	21–29–10
61	L	February 27, 1974	1–4	@ Pittsburgh Penguins (1973–74)	21–30–10
62	W	February 28, 1974	3–1	@ Atlanta Flames (1973–74)	22–30–10

March

Game	Result	Date	Score	Opponent	Record
63	W	March 2, 1974	4–2	St. Louis Blues (1973–74)	23–30–10
64	W	March 5, 1974	2–1	California Golden Seals (1973–74)	24–30–10
65	W	March 7, 1974	3–2	Chicago Black Hawks (1973–74)	25–30–10
66	T	March 9, 1974	4–4	Boston Bruins (1973–74)	25–30–11
67	W	March 13, 1974	5–1	Pittsburgh Penguins (1973–74)	26–30–11
68	W	March 16, 1974	2–0	Detroit Red Wings (1973–74)	27–30–11
69	T	March 19, 1974	1–1	Toronto Maple Leafs (1973–74)	27–30–12
70	W	March 21, 1974	6–3	California Golden Seals (1973–74)	28–30–12
71	W	March 23, 1974	5–0	Vancouver Canucks (1973–74)	29–30–12
72	W	March 24, 1974	7–1	@ California Golden Seals (1973–74)	30–30–12
73	L	March 26, 1974	1–5	@ Minnesota North Stars (1973–74)	30–31–12
74	W	March 28, 1974	4–1	New York Islanders (1973–74)	31–31–12
75	L	March 30, 1974	2–5	Montreal Canadiens (1973–74)	31–32–12

April

Game	Result	Date	Score	Opponent	Record
76	W	April 3, 1974	4–2	Atlanta Flames (1973–74)	32–32–12
77	L	April 5, 1974	2–5	@ Vancouver Canucks (1973–74)	32–33–12
78	W	April 6, 1974	11–1	Vancouver Canucks (1973–74)	33–33–12

Legend: Win (2 points) Loss (0 points) Tie (1 point)

== Playoffs ==
- Kings 1 at Black Hawks 3
- Kings 1 at Black Hawks 4
- Black Hawks 1 at Kings 0
- Black Hawks 1 at Kings 5
- Kings 0 at Black Hawks 1

The Kings were heavy underdogs against the Chicago Black Hawks but put up a strong showing. While Kings goalie Rogie Vachon was excellent, the difference was Chicago goalie Tony Esposito who was brilliant. Game one saw the Black Hawks score in the 3rd period to take a 2–1 lead and they added an empty net goal to win, 3–1. Game two was similar; this time Chicago led 3–1 when they scored an empty net goal late to make it 4–1.

Game 3 in Los Angeles was the Kings first home playoff game in 5 years and was one of the strangest games in post season history. Chicago scored goal in the first minute of the game and then went into a defensive shell, practically daring the Kings to try to beat Esposito. Almost the entire rest of the game was played in the Black Hawk zone with the Kings dominating the action. But try as they might, they could not get the puck past Tony Esposito. Their best chance came midway through the 3rd period when Bob Berry pounced on a rebound and shot it over Esposito but the puck glanced off the cross bar. Despite totaling only 5 shots on goal for the game, the Black Hawks won 1–0 and had a commanding 3–0 series lead. Game 4 was played the very next day so both coaches rested their #1 goalies; the Kings played Gary Edwards over Rogie Vachon and Chicago went with Mike Veisor over Tony Esposito. The Kings were so relieved to have Esposito out that they dominated in a 5–1 win, their first playoff victory since a game 7 win over the Oakland Seals in the 1969 quarter-finals.

Another defensive struggle ensued in game 5 with Vachon and Esposito back in the nets; both made a number of brilliant saves and the game was 0–0 midway through the 3rd period. The Black Hawks won when Cliff Koroll scuffed the ice on a slap shot; the puck acted like a knuckleball change up and fooled Vachon for the game winner.

== Transactions ==
The Kings were involved in the following transactions during the 1973–74 season.

=== Trades ===
May 15, 1973	To Los Angeles Kings Cash	To Detroit Red Wings 8th round pick in 1973 – Dennis Polonich
May 15, 1973	To Los Angeles Kings Cash	To Minnesota North Stars 11th round pick in 1973 – Max Hansen
May 29, 1973	To Los Angeles Kings Bob Murdoch; Randy Rota	To Montreal Canadiens 1st round pick in 1974 – Mario Tremblay; Cash
November 30, 1973	To Los Angeles Kings Sheldon Kannegiesser; Mike Murphy; Tom Williams	To New York Rangers Gilles Marotte; Real Lemieux
February 14, 1974	To Los Angeles Kings Gene Carr	To New York Rangers 1st round pick in 1977 – Ron Duguay
March 1, 1974	To Los Angeles Kings Jim McElmury	To Minnesota North Stars Cash
March 12, 1974	To Los Angeles Kings Tom Cassidy	To California Golden Seals Cash

=== Free agent signings ===
September 1, 1973	From Suncoast Suns (EHL) Dale Lewis
September 1, 1973	From University of Minnesota Duluth (NCAA) Mark Heaslip

=== Intra-league Draft ===
June 13, 1973	From Minnesota North Stars Bob Nevin

== Draft picks ==
Los Angeles's draft picks at the 1973 NHL amateur draft held at the Queen Elizabeth Hotel in Montreal.

Round	#	Player	Nationality	College/Junior/Club team (League)
3	38	Russ Walker	Canada	Saskatoon Blades (WCHL)
4	54	Jim McCrimmon	Canada	Medicine Hat Tigers (WCHL)
5	70	Dennis Abgrall	Canada	Saskatoon Blades (WCHL)
6	86	Blair MacDonald	Canada	Cornwall Royals (QMJHL)
7	102	Roly Kimble	Canada	Hamilton Red Wings (OHA)

== See also ==
- 1973–74 NHL season
