= Rey Comeau =

Canadian ice hockey player (born 1948)

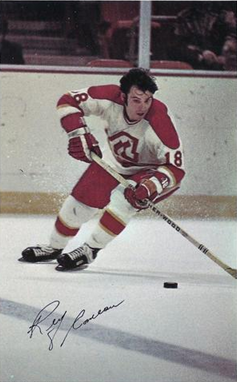
- Born: October 25, 1948 (age 77) Montreal, Quebec, Canada
- Height: 5 ft 8 in (173 cm)
- Weight: 170 lb (77 kg; 12 st 2 lb)
- Position: Centre
- Shot: Left
- Played for: Montreal Canadiens; Atlanta Flames; Colorado Rockies
- Playing career: 1965–1981

Reynald Xavier Comeau (born October 25, 1948) is a retired professional ice hockey forward who played 564 games in the National Hockey League between 1972 and 1980. He played for the Montreal Canadiens, Atlanta Flames, and Colorado Rockies.

== Regular season and playoffs ==
			Regular season					Playoffs
Season	Team	League	GP	G	A	Pts	PIM	GP	G	A	Pts	PIM
1965–66	West Island Flyers	MMJHL	37	40	32	72	37	—	—	—	—	—
1966–67	Verdun Maple Leafs	MMJHL	—	—	—	—	—	—	—	—	—	—
1966–67	Verdun Maple Leafs	M-Cup	—	—	—	—	—	4	3	1	4	2
1967–68	Verdun Maple Leafs	MMJHL	36	29	50	79	—	—	—	—	—	—
1967–68	Verdun Maple Leafs	M-Cup	—	—	—	—	—	18	8	14	22	40
1968–69	Cleveland Barons	AHL	71	17	23	40	26	4	1	0	1	0
1968–69	Houston Apollos	CHL	1	0	0	0	0	—	—	—	—	—
1969–70	Cleveland Barons	AHL	71	27	38	65	26	—	—	—	—	—
1970–71	Cleveland Barons	AHL	41	17	25	42	30	—	—	—	—	—
1970–71	Montreal Voyageurs	AHL	29	9	14	23	34	3	1	2	3	4
1971–72	Montreal Canadiens	NHL	4	0	0	0	0	—	—	—	—	—
1971–72	Nova Scotia Voyageurs	AHL	68	23	41	64	63	15	6	14	20	10
1972–73	Atlanta Flames	NHL	77	21	21	42	19	—	—	—	—	—
1973–74	Atlanta Flames	NHL	78	11	23	34	16	4	2	1	3	6
1974–75	Atlanta Flames	NHL	75	14	20	34	40	—	—	—	—	—
1975–76	Atlanta Flames	NHL	79	17	22	39	42	—	—	—	—	—
1976–77	Atlanta Flames	NHL	80	15	18	33	16	3	0	0	0	2
1977–78	Atlanta Flames	NHL	79	10	22	32	20	2	0	0	0	0
1978–79	Colorado Rockies	NHL	70	8	10	18	16	—	—	—	—	—
1979–80	Colorado Rockies	NHL	22	2	5	7	6	—	—	—	—	—
1979–80	Fort Worth Texans	CHL	57	14	35	49	16	—	—	—	—	—
1980–81	Fort Worth Texans	CHL	77	19	16	35	40	5	2	3	5	4
NHL totals			564	98	141	239	175	9	2	1	3	8
