= Nelson Pyatt =

Canadian ice hockey player (born 1953)

- Born: September 9, 1953 (age 72) Port Arthur, Ontario, Canada
- Height: 6 ft 0 in (183 cm)
- Weight: 175 lb (79 kg; 12 st 7 lb)
- Position: Center
- Shot: Right
- Played for: Detroit Red Wings; Washington Capitals; Colorado Rockies
- National team: Canada
- NHL draft: 39th overall, 1973; Detroit Red Wings
- WHA draft: 59th overall, 1973; Minnesota Fighting Saints
- Playing career: 1973–1982

Frederick Nelson Pyatt (born September 9, 1953) is a Canadian former professional ice hockey player. Pyatt was born in Port Arthur, Ontario. Drafted in 1973 by both the Detroit Red Wings of the National Hockey League (NHL) and the Minnesota Fighting Saints of the World Hockey Association, Pyatt also played for the Washington Capitals and Colorado Rockies.

He is the father of Jesse and former NHL players Tom and Taylor Pyatt.

== Regular season and playoffs ==
			Regular season					Playoffs
Season	Team	League	GP	G	A	Pts	PIM	GP	G	A	Pts	PIM
1971–72	Oshawa Generals	OHA	54	17	29	46	27	—	—	—	—	—
1972–73	Oshawa Generals	OHA	26	13	19	32	7	—	—	—	—	—
1973–74	Detroit Red Wings	NHL	5	0	0	0	0	—	—	—	—	—
1973–74	London Lions	Exhib	61	35	28	63	4	—	—	—	—	—
1974–75	Virginia Wings	AHL	14	3	4	7	12	—	—	—	—	—
1974–75	Detroit Red Wings	NHL	9	0	0	0	2	—	—	—	—	—
1974–75	Washington Capitals	NHL	16	6	4	10	2	—	—	—	—	—
1975–76	Washington Capitals	NHL	77	26	23	49	14	—	—	—	—	—
1976–77	Colorado Rockies	NHL	77	23	22	45	20	—	—	—	—	—
1977–78	Colorado Rockies	NHL	71	9	12	21	8	—	—	—	—	—
1978–79	Colorado Rockies	NHL	28	2	2	4	2	—	—	—	—	—
1978–79	Philadelphia Firebirds	AHL	7	3	1	4	0	—	—	—	—	—
1979–80	Fort Worth Texans	CHL	45	20	17	37	11	15	5	1	6	2
1979–80	Colorado Rockies	NHL	13	5	0	5	2	—	—	—	—	—
1980–81	VER Selb	GER-2	22	37	26	63	4	—	—	—	—	—
1981–82	VER Selb	GER-2	46	78	31	109	36	—	—	—	—	—
NHL totals			296	71	63	134	69	—	—	—	—	—
