= Blair Stewart (ice hockey) =

Canadian ice hockey player (born 1953)

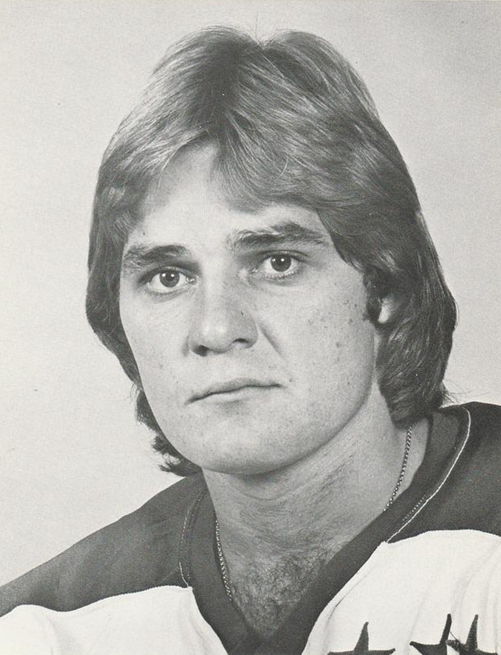
- Born: March 15, 1953 (age 73) Winnipeg, Manitoba, Canada
- Height: 5 ft 11 in (180 cm)
- Weight: 185 lb (84 kg; 13 st 3 lb)
- Position: Forward
- Played for: Detroit Red Wings; Washington Capitals; Quebec Nordiques
- NHL draft: 75th overall, 1973; Detroit Red Wings
- Playing career: 1973–1981

Blair James Stewart (born March 15, 1953) is a Canadian former professional ice hockey player.

Stewart was born in Winnipeg, Manitoba. Drafted in 1973 by the Detroit Red Wings of the National Hockey League (NHL), Stewart played for Detroit and also for the Washington Capitals and Quebec Nordiques. In 2013, Stewart, along with nine other former NHL players, sued the league for negligence in protecting players from concussions.

== Career statistics ==
=== Regular season and playoffs ===
			Regular season					Playoffs
Season	Team	League	GP	G	A	Pts	PIM	GP	G	A	Pts	PIM
1971–72	Winnipeg Jets	WCHL	44	8	10	18	112	—	—	—	—	—
1972–73	Winnipeg Jets	WCHL	68	24	36	60	151	—	—	—	—	—
1973–74	Detroit Red Wings	NHL	17	0	4	4	16	—	—	—	—	—
1973–74	Virginia Wings	AHL	54	9	13	22	99	—	—	—	—	—
1974–75	Detroit Red Wings	NHL	19	0	5	5	38	—	—	—	—	—
1974–75	Virginia Wings	AHL	26	7	10	17	93	—	—	—	—	—
1974–75	Washington Capitals	NHL	2	1	0	1	2	—	—	—	—	—
1975–76	Washington Capitals	NHL	74	13	14	27	113	—	—	—	—	—
1976–77	Washington Capitals	NHL	34	5	2	7	85	—	—	—	—	—
1976–77	Springfield Indians	AHL	4	1	3	4	11	—	—	—	—	—
1977–78	Washington Capitals	NHL	8	0	1	1	9	—	—	—	—	—
1977–78	Hershey Bears	AHL	20	9	9	18	46	—	—	—	—	—
1978–79	Washington Capitals	NHL	45	7	12	19	48	—	—	—	—	—
1978–79	Hershey Bears	AHL	23	16	8	24	49	—	—	—	—	—
1979–80	Quebec Nordiques	NHL	30	8	6	14	15	—	—	—	—	—
1979–80	Syracuse Firebirds	AHL	20	9	10	19	35	4	1	1	2	27
1980–81	Houston Apollos	CHL	9	1	0	1	24	—	—	—	—	—
1980–81	Fort Worth Texans	CHL	38	12	9	21	48	5	1	2	3	18
AHL totals			147	51	53	104	333	4	1	1	2	27
NHL totals			229	34	44	78	326	—	—	—	—	—
