= Bob Paradise =

American ice hockey player (born 1944)

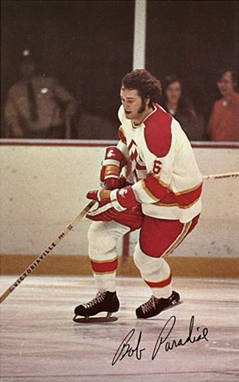
- Born: April 22, 1944 (age 82) Saint Paul, Minnesota, U.S.
- Height: 6 ft 1 in (185 cm)
- Weight: 205 lb (93 kg; 14 st 9 lb)
- Position: Defense
- Shot: Left
- Played for: Minnesota North Stars; Atlanta Flames; Pittsburgh Penguins; Washington Capitals
- National team: United States
- NHL draft: Undrafted
- Playing career: 1966–1979

Robert Harvey Paradise (born April 22, 1944) is an American former professional ice hockey defenseman who appeared in a total of 368 National Hockey League (NHL) regular season games between 1971 and 1979. Internationally, Paradise played for the American national team at the 1969 and 1977 World Championships, as well as at the 1968 Winter Olympics. He is a member of the United States Hockey Hall of Fame.

== Playing career ==
Paradise originally signed as a free agent by the Montreal Canadiens after playing for the United States national team at the 1968 Winter Olympics and 1969 Ice Hockey World Championships. He was later traded to the Minnesota North Stars in 1971, where he made his NHL debut. He also played for the Atlanta Flames, Washington Capitals, and the Pittsburgh Penguins before retiring in 1979. He was also a member of the US national team at the 1977 Ice Hockey World Championship tournament.

In a 2007 interview on The Sports Network, New York Islanders great Clark Gillies named Paradise as "the toughest guy you ever fought."

== Personal life ==
Paradise grew up in Saint Paul where he earned all-state honors in football and hockey while attending Cretin High School in Saint Paul. He also turned down a professional baseball contract from the Boston Red Sox in 1965, choosing instead complete his education at St. Mary's College. While at the school, Paradise continued to develop his hockey skills, becoming an all-conference performer in the Minnesota Intercollegiate Athletic Conference for four consecutive years.

Paradise is the son-in-law of United States Hockey Hall of Famer Bob Dill. His brother Dick Paradise is also a former professional hockey player.

== Career statistics ==
=== Regular season and playoffs ===
			Regular season					Playoffs
Season	Team	League	GP	G	A	Pts	PIM	GP	G	A	Pts	PIM
1959–60	Cretin-Derham Hall High School	HS-MN	—	—	—	—	—	—	—	—	—	—
1960–61	Cretin-Derham Hall High School	HS-MN	—	—	—	—	—	—	—	—	—	—
1961–62	Cretin-Derham Hall High School	HS-MN	—	—	—	—	—	—	—	—	—	—
1962–63	Saint Mary's College	NCAA-III	17	7	15	22	—	—	—	—	—	—
1963–64	Saint Mary's College	NCAA-III	15	7	14	21	—	—	—	—	—	—
1964–65	Saint Mary's College	NCAA-III	18	12	18	30	—	—	—	—	—	—
1965–66	Saint Mary's College	NCAA-III	17	6	8	14	—	—	—	—	—	—
1966–67	Muskegon Mohawks	IHL	42	5	6	11	47	—	—	—	—	—
1967–68	Minnesota Nationals	USHL	24	2	6	8	43	—	—	—	—	—
1968–69	United States National Team	Intl	—	—	—	—	—	—	—	—	—	—
1969–70	Omaha Knights	CHL	61	3	14	17	98	12	0	2	2	27
1970–71	Montreal Voyageurs	AHL	72	0	9	9	107	3	0	0	0	0
1971–72	Cleveland Barons	AHL	4	0	0	0	0	—	—	—	—	—
1971–72	Seattle Totems	WHL	54	5	8	13	80	—	—	—	—	—
1971–72	Minnesota North Stars	NHL	6	0	0	0	6	4	0	0	0	2
1972–73	Atlanta Flames	NHL	71	1	7	8	103	—	—	—	—	—
1973–74	Atlanta Flames	NHL	18	0	1	1	13	—	—	—	—	—
1973–74	Pittsburgh Penguins	NHL	38	2	7	9	39	—	—	—	—	—
1974–75	Pittsburgh Penguins	NHL	78	3	15	18	109	6	0	1	1	17
1975–76	Pittsburgh Penguins	NHL	9	0	0	0	4	—	—	—	—	—
1975–76	Washington Capitals	NHL	48	0	8	8	42	—	—	—	—	—
1976–77	Springfield Indians	AHL	14	0	4	4	18	—	—	—	—	—
1976–77	Washington Capitals	NHL	22	0	5	5	20	—	—	—	—	—
1977–78	Pittsburgh Penguins	NHL	64	2	10	12	53	—	—	—	—	—
1978–79	Binghamton Dusters	AHL	16	0	1	1	12	—	—	—	—	—
1978–79	Pittsburgh Penguins	NHL	14	0	1	1	4	2	0	0	0	0
NHL totals			368	8	54	62	393	12	0	1	1	19

=== International ===
Year	Team	Event	GP	G	A	Pts	PIM
1968	United States	OLY	7	0	0	0	0
1969	United States	WC	8	0	0	0	30
1977	United States	WC	9	0	0	0	8
Senior totals			24	0	0	0	38

== Transactions ==
- June, 1970 – Signed as a free agent by Montreal.
- May, 1971 – Traded to Minnesota by Montreal with the rights to Gary Gambucci for cash.
- June 6, 1972 – Traded to Atlanta by Minnesota for cash.
- January 4, 1974 – Traded to Pittsburgh by Atlanta with Chuck Arnason for Al McDonough.
- November 26, 1975 – Traded to Washington by Pittsburgh for Washington's 2nd round choice (Greg Malone) in 1976 Amateur Draft.
- October 1, 1977 – Traded to Pittsburgh by Washington for the rights to Don Awrey.
