= 1973–74 NHL transactions =

The following is a list of all team-to-team transactions that have occurred in the National Hockey League during the 1973–74 NHL season. It lists what team each player has been traded to, signed by, or claimed by, and for which players or draft picks, if applicable.

== Trades ==
=== May ===
May 14, 1973	To Chicago Black Hawks Dale Tallon	To Vancouver Canucks Jerry Korab; Gary Smith
May 15, 1973	To Detroit Red Wings Rick Foley	To Philadelphia Flyers Serge Lajeunesse
May 15, 1973	To Atlanta Flames 1st-round pick - 1973 Amateur Draft (# 2 - Tom Lysiak); 1st-round pick - 1973 Amateur Draft (# 16 - Vic Mercredi); 2nd-round pick - 1973 Amateur Draft (# 21 - Eric Vail)	To Montreal Canadiens 1st-round pick - 1973 Amateur Draft (STL - # 5 - John Davidson)^{1} 1st-round pick - 1977 Amateur Draft (#10 - Mark Napier); 2nd-round pick - 1978 Amateur Draft (# 30 - Dale Yakiwchuk)
May 15, 1973	To Montreal Canadiens 1st-round pick - 1973 Amateur Draft (# 8 - Bob Gainey); 4th-round pick - 1973 Amateur Draft (# 56 - Alan Hangsleben); 1st-round pick - 1975 Amateur Draft (# 9 - Robin Sadler)	To St. Louis Blues 1st-round pick - 1973 Amateur Draft (# 5 - John Davidson); 3rd-round pick - 1973 Amateur Draft (# 48 - Bob Gassoff)
May 15, 1973	To Montreal Canadiens 1st-round pick - 1974 Amateur Draft (# 5 - Cam Connor)	To Vancouver Canucks 1st-round pick - 1973 Amateur Draft (# 9 - Bob Dailey)
May 15, 1973	To Philadelphia Flyers Bernie Parent; 2nd-round pick - 1973 Amateur Draft (# 20 - Larry Goodenough)	To Toronto Maple Leafs 1st-round pick - 1973 Amateur Draft (# 10 - Bob Neely) future considerations^{2} (Doug Favell)
May 15, 1973	To Minnesota North Stars 2nd-round pick - 1973 Amateur Draft (# 18 - Blake Dunlop)	To Montreal Canadiens 2nd-round pick - 1975 Amateur Draft (# 22 - Brian Engblom)
May 15, 1973	To Detroit Red Wings 8th-round pick - 1973 Amateur Draft (#118 - Dennis Polonich)	To Los Angeles Kings cash
May 15, 1973	To Detroit Red Wings 9th-round pick - 1973 Amateur Draft (# 135 - Dennis O'Brien); 10th-round pick - 1973 Amateur Draft (# 151 - Kevin Neville)	To St. Louis Blues cash
May 15, 1973	To Buffalo Sabres cash	To Detroit Red Wings 9th-round pick - 1973 Amateur Draft (# 139 - Ray Bibeau); 10th-round pick - 1973 Amateur Draft (# 155 - Mitch Brandt); 11th-round pick - 1973 Amateur Draft^{3}
May 15, 1973	To Chicago Black Hawks 9th-round pick - 1973 Amateur Draft (#141 - Steve Alley)	To New York Rangers cash
May 15, 1973	To New York Islanders cash	To Toronto Maple Leafs 10th-round pick - 1973 Amateur Draft (# 144 - Lee Palmer); 11th-round pick in 1973 Amateur Draft (# 159 - Norm McLeod)
May 15, 1973	To Minnesota North Stars 11th-round pick - 1973 Amateur Draft (# 161 - Russ Wiechnik)	To Toronto Maple Leafs cash
May 15, 1973	To Los Angeles Kings cash	To Minnesota North Stars 11th-round pick in 1973 Amateur Draft (# 163 - Max Hansen)
May 15, 1973	To Montreal Canadiens 13th-round pick - 1973 Amateur Draft (# 168 - Louis Chiasson)	To New York Rangers 13th-round pick - 1973 Amateur Draft^{4}
May 22, 1973	To Boston Bruins Gilles Gilbert	To Minnesota North Stars Fred Stanfield
May 23, 1973	To Philadelphia Flyers cash	To Toronto Maple Leafs Willie Brossart
May 29, 1973	To Minnesota North Stars Murray Anderson; Tony Featherstone	To Montreal Canadiens cash
May 29, 1973	To Toronto Maple Leafs Dunc Wilson	To Vancouver Canucks Murray Heatley; Larry McIntyre
May 29, 1973	To Los Angeles Kings Bob Murdoch; Randy Rota	To Montreal Canadiens 1st-round pick - 1974 Amateur Draft (# 12 - Mario Tremblay) cash
May 29, 1973	To Atlanta Flames Dale Hoganson	To Montreal Canadiens cash
May 29, 1973	To Atlanta Flames Chuck Arnason	To Montreal Canadiens 1st-round pick - 1974 Amateur Draft (# 10 - Rick Chartraw)
May 29, 1973	To Atlanta Flames Bob Murray; 4th-round pick in 1977 Amateur Draft (# 72 - Jim Ctraig)	To Montreal Canadiens 3rd-round pick in 1977 Amateur Draft (# 46 - Pierre Lagace); 4th-round pick in 1977 Amateur Draft (# 64 - Robert Holland)

1. This pick went to St. Louis as the result of a trade on May 15, 1973, that sent that sent St. Louis' first-round and fourth-round pick in 1973 NHL Amateur Draft and first-round pick in 1975 NHL Amateur Draft in exchange for Montreal's third-round pick in 1973 NHL Amateur Draft and this pick.
2. Trade completed on July 27, 1973.
3. Detroit passed on making a selection.
4. The Rangers passed on making a selection.

=== June ===
June 10, 1973	To Atlanta Flames cash	To California Golden Seals Ted Tucker
June 14, 1973	To Buffalo Sabres Paul Curtis	To St. Louis Blues Jake Rathwell

=== July ===
July 3, 1973	To Pittsburgh Penguins cash	To Toronto Maple Leafs Eddie Shack

=== August ===
August 30, 1973	To Atlanta Flames Mike Baumgartner	To Chicago Black Hawks Lynn Powis

=== September ===
September, 1973 exact date unknown	To Minnesota North Stars cash	To Montreal Canadiens Gary Geldart
September 8, 1973	To New York Rangers Don Borgeson; Norm Dennis	To St. Louis Blues Bob Kelly

=== October ===
October 4, 1973	To Pittsburgh Penguins Bob Johnson	To St. Louis Blues Nick Harbaruk
October 5, 1973	To Boston Bruins Jake Rathwell; 2nd-round pick - 1974 Amateur Draft (# 25 - Mark Howe) cash	To St. Louis Blues Don Awrey
October 17, 1973	To Detroit Red Wings Terry Clancy	To Toronto Maple Leafs cash
October 25, 1973	To Boston Bruins Darryl Edestrand	To Pittsburgh Penguins Nick Beverley
October 27, 1973	To Detroit Red Wings Brent Hughes	To St. Louis Blues cash
October 28, 1973	To New York Rangers Jack Egers	To St. Louis Blues Glen Sather; Rene Villemure

=== November ===
November, 1973 exact date unknown	To Philadelphia Flyers George Pesut	To St. Louis Blues Bob Stumpf
November 7, 1973	To Detroit Red Wings Ted Harris	To Minnesota North Stars Gary Bergman
November 23, 1973	To Boston Bruins cash	To Detroit Red Wings Doug Roberts
November 28, 1973	To Detroit Red Wings Pierre Jarry	To Toronto Maple Leafs Tim Ecclestone
November 30, 1973	To Los Angeles Kings Sheldon Kannegiesser; Mike Murphy; Tom Williams	To New York Rangers Real Lemieux; Gilles Marotte

=== December ===
December, 1973 exact date unknown	To Philadelphia Flyers Ray Schultz	To St. Louis Blues Frank Spring
December 10, 1973	To St. Louis Blues John Wright	To Vancouver Canucks Mike Lampman
December 27, 1973	To Buffalo Sabres Jerry Korab	To Vancouver Canucks John Gould; Tracy Pratt

=== January ===
January 4, 1974	To Atlanta Flames Al McDonough	To Pittsburgh Penguins Chuck Arnason; Bob Paradise
January 17, 1974	To Detroit Red Wings Jack Lynch; Jim Rutherford	To Pittsburgh Penguins Ron Stackhouse
January 17, 1974	To Pittsburgh Penguins Ab DeMarco Jr. Steve Durbano; Bob Kelly	To St. Louis Blues Greg Polis; Bryan Watson; 2nd-round pick - 1974 Amateur Draft (# 26 - Bob Hess)
January 21, 1974	To Buffalo Sabres Real Lemieux	To New York Rangers Paul Curtis

=== February ===
February 7, 1974	To Boston Bruins Bobby Schmautz	To Vancouver Canucks Chris Oddleifson; Fred O'Donnell; Mike Walton
February 14, 1974	To Detroit Red Wings Chris Evans; Jean Hamel; Bryan Watson	To St. Louis Blues Garnet Bailey; Bill Collins; Ted Harris
February 14, 1974	To Los Angeles Kings Gene Carr	To New York Rangers 1st-round pick in 1977 Amateur Draft) (# 13 - Ron Duguay)
February 28, 1974	To Detroit Red Wings Claude Houde	To New York Rangers Brian Lavender

=== March ===
March 1, 1974	To Los Angeles Kings Jim McElmury	To Minnesota North Stars cash
March 7, 1974	To Chicago Black Hawks Germain Gagnon	To New York Islanders cash future considerations^{1} (Walt Ledingham)
March 9, 1974	To Montreal Canadiens 1st-round pick - 1974 Amateur Draft (# 7 - Doug Risebrough)	To St. Louis Blues Dave Gardner
March 10, 1974	To Buffalo Sabres Brian Spencer	To New York Islanders Doug Rombough
March 12, 1974	To California Golden Seals cash	To Los Angeles Kings Tom Cassidy

1. Trade completed on May 24, 1974.

== Additional sources ==
- "NHL trades for 1972-1973". NHL Trade Tracker.
