= Schmautz =

Schmautz is the name of:

- Arnie Schmautz (1933–2016), American ice hockey player
- Bobby Schmautz (1945–2021), American ice hockey player
- Cliff Schmautz (1939–2002), American ice hockey player
- Ray Schmautz (born 1943), American football player
- Harald Schmautz, key figure in Tradition und Leben
