= 1979 Stanley Cup playoffs =

Tournament details
- Dates: April 10–May 21, 1979
- Teams: 12
- Defending champions: Montreal Canadiens

Final positions
- Champions: Montreal Canadiens
- Runners-up: New York Rangers

Tournament statistics
- Scoring leader(s): Jacques Lemaire (Canadiens) & Guy Lafleur (Canadiens) (23 points)

Awards
- MVP: Bob Gainey (Canadiens)

The 1979 Stanley Cup playoffs, the playoff tournament of the National Hockey League, (NHL) began on April 10, after the conclusion of the 1978–79 NHL season. The playoffs concluded on May 21, with the three-time defending champion Montreal Canadiens defeating the New York Rangers 4–1 to win the final series four games to one, for their fourth consecutive Stanley Cup championship. Three Original Six teams made the semifinals, which would not happen again until the 2014 Conference finals.

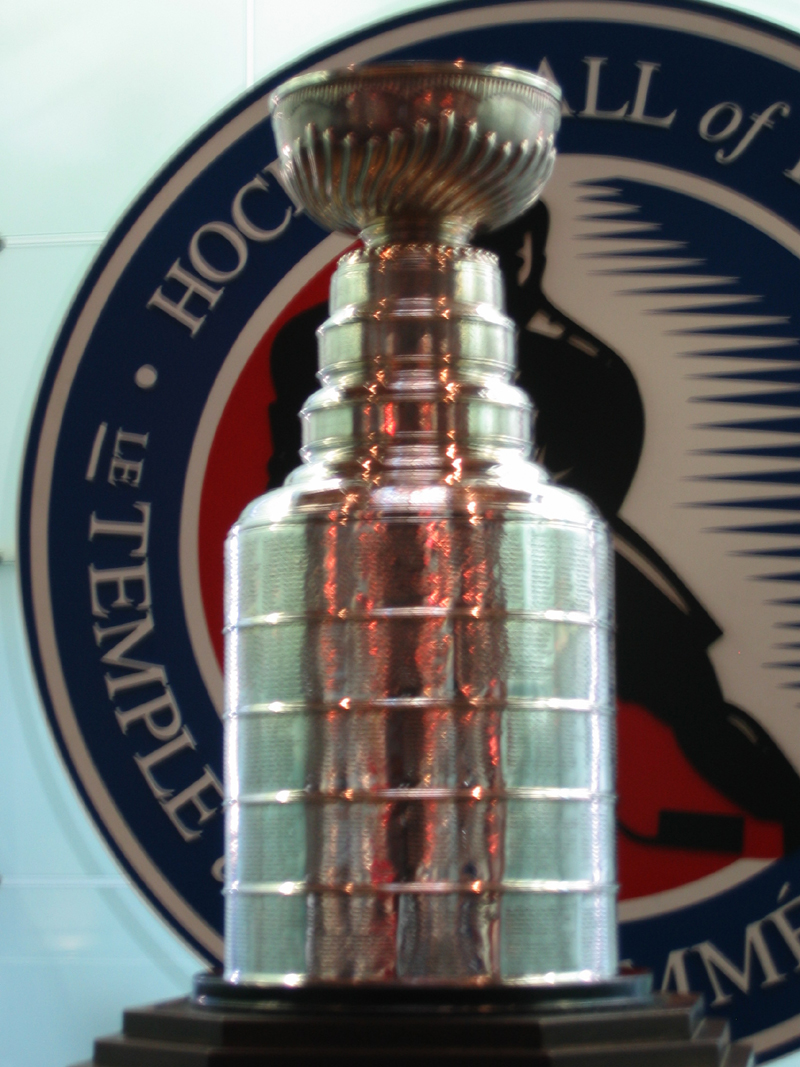
The Stanley Cup

== Playoff seeds ==
The top two teams in each division made the playoffs, along with the four next-best regular-season records from teams in the entire league finishing third or lower. All 12 clubs then were seeded 1–12 based on regular season points, regardless of conference or division, as follows:

1. New York Islanders, Patrick Division champions, Clarence Campbell Conference regular season champions, NHL regular season champions – 116 points
2. Montreal Canadiens, Norris Division champions, Prince of Wales Conference regular season champions – 115 points
3. Boston Bruins, Adams Division champions – 100 points
4. Philadelphia Flyers – 95 points
5. New York Rangers – 91 points
6. Atlanta Flames – 90 points
7. Buffalo Sabres – 88 points
8. Pittsburgh Penguins – 85 points
9. Toronto Maple Leafs – 81 points
10. Los Angeles Kings – 80 points
11. Chicago Black Hawks, Smythe Division champions – 73 points
12. Vancouver Canucks – 63 points

== Playoff bracket ==
The four division winners earned a bye to the quarterfinals, while the other eight teams competed first in the Preliminary Round. The NHL used "re-seeding" instead of a fixed bracket playoff system: in each round, the highest remaining seed was matched against the lowest remaining seed, the second-highest remaining seed played the second-lowest remaining seed, and so forth.

Each series in the Preliminary Round was played in a best-of-three format while each series in the other three rounds were played in a best-of-seven format.

Preliminary round
1 | Philadelphia | 2
8 | Vancouver | 1
2 | NY Rangers | 2
7 | Los Angeles | 0
3 | Atlanta | 0
6 | Toronto | 2
4 | Buffalo | 1
5 | Pittsburgh | 2

Quarterfinals
1 | NY Islanders | 4
8 | Chicago | 0
4 | Philadelphia | 1
5 | NY Rangers | 4
2 | Montreal | 4
7 | Toronto | 0
3 | Boston | 4
6 | Pittsburgh | 0

Semifinals
1 | NY Islanders | 2
4 | NY Rangers | 4
2 | Montreal | 4
3 | Boston | 3

Stanley Cup Final
2 | Montreal | 4
4 | NY Rangers | 1

== Preliminary round ==
=== (1) Philadelphia Flyers vs. (8) Vancouver Canucks ===
This was the first playoff series meeting between these two teams.

| April 10 | Vancouver Canucks | 3–2 | Philadelphia Flyers | Spectrum | Recap |
| No scoring | | First period | No scoring |
| Thomas Gradin (1) – 01:35 | | Second period | No scoring |
| Stan Smyl (1) – 00:09; Don Lever (1) – 10:38 | | Third period | 06:30 – Bobby Clarke (1); 19:35 – Reggie Leach (1) |
| Gary Bromley 28 saves / 30 shots | | Goalie stats | Wayne Stephenson 23 saves / 26 shots |

| April 12 | Philadelphia Flyers | 6–4 | Vancouver Canucks | Pacific Coliseum | Recap |
| Tom Gorence (1) – 01:47; Reggie Leach (2) – pp – 18:39 | | First period | 14:10 – pp – Don Lever (2); 16:11 – pp – Dennis Kearns (1) |
| Tom Gorence (2) – 01:12 | | Second period | 01:48 – Thomas Gradin (2) |
| Ken Linseman (1) – 13:36; Reggie Leach (3) – 19:06; Bill Barber (1) -en – 19:57 | | Third period | 16:40 – Thomas Gradin (3) |
| Robbie Moore 17 saves / 21 shots | | Goalie stats | Gary Bromley 31 saves / 36 shots |

| April 14 | Vancouver Canucks | 2–7 | Philadelphia Flyers | Spectrum | Recap |
| Thomas Gradin (4) – 17:34 | | First period | 04:13 – pp – Bobby Clarke (2); 07:20 – Al Hill (1) |
| No scoring | | Second period | 00:34 – pp – Reggie Leach (4); 08:53 – pp – Tom Gorence (3); 10:27 – Blake Dunlop (1) |
| Don Kozak (1) – 15:11 | | Third period | 03:05 – Bill Barber (2); 12:58 – Paul Holmgren (1) |
| Gary Bromley 21 saves / 28 shots | | Goalie stats | Robbie Moore 29 saves / 31 shots |

| Philadelphia won series 2–1 |

=== (2) New York Rangers vs. (7) Los Angeles Kings ===
This was the first playoff series meeting between these two teams.

| April 10 | Los Angeles Kings | 1–7 | New York Rangers | Madison Square Garden | Recap |
| Charlie Simmer (1) – pp – 09:17 | | First period | 06:15 – pp – Lucien DeBlois (1); 14:16 – pp – Mike McEwen (1) |
| No scoring | | Second period | 06:15 – Steve Vickers (1); 09:08 – Dave Maloney (1); 13:38 – pp – Ron Greschner (1); 15:49 – Walt Tkaczuk (1) |
| No scoring | | Third period | 13:02 – Dave Maloney (2) |
| Mario Lessard 23 saves / 30 shots | | Goalie stats | John Davidson 31 saves / 32 shots |

| April 12 | New York Rangers | 2–1 | OT | Los Angeles Kings | The Forum | Recap |
| No scoring | | First period | | 12:29 – pp – Syl Apps Jr. (1) |
| No scoring | | Second period | | No scoring |
| Phil Esposito (1) – 01:11 | | Third period | | No scoring |
| Phil Esposito (2) – 06:11 | | First overtime period | | No scoring |
| John Davidson 35 saves / 36 shots | | Goalie stats | | Mario Lessard 41 saves / 43 shots |

| New York won series 2–0 |

=== (3) Atlanta Flames vs. (6) Toronto Maple Leafs ===
This was the first playoff series meeting between these two teams.

| April 10 | Toronto Maple Leafs | 2–1 | Atlanta Flames | Omni Coliseum | Recap |
| No scoring | | First period | No scoring |
| Walt McKechnie (1) – sh – 06:26; Walt McKechnie (2) – 09:14 | | Second period | 16:37 – Jean Pronovost (1) |
| No scoring | | Third period | No scoring |
| Mike Palmateer 27 saves / 28 shots | | Goalie stats | Dan Bouchard 19 saves / 21 shots |

| April 12 | Atlanta Flames | 4–7 | Toronto Maple Leafs | Maple Leaf Gardens | Recap |
| Jean Pronovost (2) – pp – 10:51 | | First period | 04:04 – Darryl Sittler (1); 04:16 – Darryl Sittler (2); 04:27 – Ron Ellis (1) |
| Guy Chouinard (1) – pp – 11:41 | | Second period | 03:09 – Pat Boutette (1); 08:38 – pp – Dan Maloney (1); 15:42 – Walt McKechnie (3); 17:32 – Pat Boutette (2) |
| Bobby Lalonde (1) – pp – 03:57; Willi Plett (1) – 10:02 | | Third period | No scoring |
| Dan Bouchard 20 saves / 27 shots Rejean Lemelin 15 saves / 15 shots | | Goalie stats | Mike Palmateer 22 saves / 26 shots |

| Toronto won series 2–0 |

=== (4) Buffalo Sabres vs. (5) Pittsburgh Penguins ===
This was the first playoff series meeting between these two teams.

| April 10 | Pittsburgh Penguins | 4–3 | Buffalo Sabres | Buffalo Memorial Auditorium | Recap |
| Rod Schutt (1) – 11:32 | | First period | 10:49 – Mike Boland (1) |
| No scoring | | Second period | 12:48 – Rene Robert (1) |
| Blair Chapman (1) – 05:21; Gary McAdam (1) – 13:54; Orest Kindrachuk (1) – 15:46 | | Third period | 17:26 – Don Luce (1) |
| Denis Herron 28 saves / 31 shots | | Goalie stats | Bob Sauve 18 saves / 22 shots |

| April 12 | Buffalo Sabres | 3–1 | Pittsburgh Penguins | Civic Arena | Recap |
| Rick Dudley (1) – 19:22 | | First period | No scoring |
| Jacques Richard (1) – 02:59 | | Second period | 17:19 – Colin Campbell (1) |
| Rene Robert (2) – 19:11 | | Third period | No scoring |
| Bob Sauve 30 saves / 31 shots | | Goalie stats | Denis Herron 27 saves / 30 shots |

| April 14 | Pittsburgh Penguins | 4–3 | OT | Buffalo Sabres | Buffalo Memorial Auditorium | Recap |
| Jim Hamilton (1) – 13:04 | | First period | | 12:59 – pp – Gilbert Perreault (1); 16:35 – Craig Ramsay (1) |
| Jim Hamilton (2) – 11:47 | | Second period | | 17:38 – Jerry Korab (1) |
| George Ferguson (1) – 04:17 | | Third period | | No scoring |
| George Ferguson (2) – 00:47 | | First overtime period | | No scoring |
| Denis Herron 38 saves / 41 shots | | Goalie stats | | Bob Sauve 20 saves / 24 shots |

| Pittsburgh won series 2–1 |

== Quarterfinals ==
=== (1) New York Islanders vs. (8) Chicago Black Hawks ===
This was the second playoff series meeting between these two teams. New York won the only previous meeting in a two-game sweep in the 1977 Preliminary Round.

| April 16 | Chicago Black Hawks | 2–6 | New York Islanders | Nassau Coliseum | Recap |
| Reg Kerr (1) – 07:36 | | First period | 02:29 – Wayne Merrick (1); 18:41 – Mike Bossy (1) |
| Bob Murray (1) – 06:46 | | Second period | 02:27 – Bryan Trottier (1); 14:25 – pp – Mike Bossy (2) |
| No scoring | | Third period | 03:49 – Denis Potvin (1); 15:27 – Mike Bossy (3) |
| Tony Esposito 28 saves / 34 shots | | Goalie stats | Chico Resch 22 saves / 24 shots |

| April 18 | Chicago Black Hawks | 0–1 | OT | New York Islanders | Nassau Coliseum | Recap |
| No scoring | | First period | | No scoring |
| No scoring | | Second period | | No scoring |
| No scoring | | Third period | | No scoring |
| No scoring | | First overtime period | | 02:31 – Mike Bossy (4) |
| Tony Esposito 39 saves / 40 shots | | Goalie stats | | Billy Smith 22 saves / 22 shots |

| April 20 | New York Islanders | 4–0 | Chicago Black Hawks | Chicago Stadium | Recap |
| Billy Harris (1) – pp – 18:08 | | First period | No scoring |
| Lorne Henning (1) – 17:47 | | Second period | No scoring |
| Clark Gillies (1) – 03:00; Denis Potvin (2) – 11:45 | | Third period | No scoring |
| Chico Resch 21 saves / 21 shots | | Goalie stats | Tony Esposito 24 saves / 28 shots |

| April 22 | New York Islanders | 3–1 | Chicago Black Hawks | Chicago Stadium | Recap |
| Denis Potvin (3) – 15:09 | | First period | No scoring |
| Ed Westfall (1) – 01:24 | | Second period | 07:05 – Mike Walton (1) |
| Mike Bossy (5) – 08:02 | | Third period | No scoring |
| Billy Smith 27 saves / 28 shots | | Goalie stats | Tony Esposito 21 saves / 24 shots |

| New York won series 4–0 |

=== (2) Montreal Canadiens vs. (7) Toronto Maple Leafs ===
This was the fifteenth playoff meeting between these two teams; with the teams splitting the fourteen previous series. They met in previous year's Stanley Cup semifinals, which Montreal won in a four-game sweep.

These teams did not meet again in the playoffs until 2021.

| April 16 | Toronto Maple Leafs | 2–5 | Montreal Canadiens | Montreal Forum | Recap |
| Lanny McDonald (1) – 09:36 | | First period | No scoring |
| Dan Maloney (2) – 03:23 | | Second period | 04:33 – Steve Shutt (1); 13:05 – pp – Guy Lafleur (1) |
| No scoring | | Third period | 04:23 – Jacques Lemaire (1); 07:15 – Jacques Lemaire (2); 09:59 – pp – Yvon Lambert (1) |
| Mike Palmateer 28 saves / 33 shots | | Goalie stats | Ken Dryden 26 saves / 28 shots |

| April 18 | Toronto Maple Leafs | 1–5 | Montreal Canadiens | Montreal Forum | Recap |
| No scoring | | First period | 02:50 – Bob Gainey (1); 09:33 – Guy Lafleur (2) |
| No scoring | | Second period | 07:01 – pp – Jacques Lemaire (3) |
| Lanny McDonald (2) – 19:43 | | Third period | 13:19 – Bob Gainey (2); 14:36 – Steve Shutt (2) |
| Mike Palmateer 20 saves / 23 shots Paul Harrison 13 saves / 15 shots | | Goalie stats | Ken Dryden 27 saves / 28 shots |

| April 21 | Montreal Canadiens | 4–3 | 2OT | Toronto Maple Leafs | Maple Leaf Gardens | Recap |
| Mark Napier (1) – 02:48 | | First period | | 05:06 – pp – Darryl Sittler (3); 08:14 – Lanny McDonald (3) |
| Larry Robinson (1) – 04:35; Jacques Lemaire (4) – pp – 06:12 | | Second period | | No scoring |
| No scoring | | Third period | | 17:40 – Darryl Sittler (4) |
| Cam Connor (1) – 05:25 | | Second overtime period | | No scoring |
| Ken Dryden 38 saves / 41 shots | | Goalie stats | | Mike Palmateer 40 saves / 44 shots |

| April 22 | Montreal Canadiens | 5–4 | OT | Toronto Maple Leafs | Maple Leaf Gardens | Recap |
| Yvon Lambert (2) – pp – 06:55; Larry Robinson (2) – 07:57 | | First period | | No scoring |
| Pierre Mondou (1) – 08:06; Pat Hughes (1) – 10:31 | | Second period | | 14:46 – Rocky Saganiuk (1); 16:06 – pp – Darryl Sittler (5) |
| No scoring | | Third period | | 13:29 – Walt McKechnie (4); 13:58 – Dan Maloney (3) |
| Larry Robinson (3) – pp – 04:14 | | First overtime period | | No scoring |
| Ken Dryden 29 saves / 33 shots | | Goalie stats | | Paul Harrison 30 saves / 35 shots |

| Montreal won series 4–0 |

=== (3) Boston Bruins vs. (6) Pittsburgh Penguins ===
This was the first playoff series meeting between these two teams.

| April 16 | Pittsburgh Penguins | 2–6 | Boston Bruins | Boston Garden | Recap |
| No scoring | | First period | 02:29 – Peter McNab (1); 05:21 – Don Marcotte (1); 15:58 – Mike Milbury (1) |
| Orest Kindrachuk (2) – 06:07 | | Second period | 04:21 – Don Marcotte (2); 16:02 – pp – Bobby Schmautz (1); 17:27 – sh – Dick Redmond (1) |
| Gregg Sheppard (1) – pp – 12:14 | | Third period | No scoring |
| Denis Herron 27 saves / 33 shots | | Goalie stats | Gerry Cheevers 19 saves / 21 shots |

| April 18 | Pittsburgh Penguins | 3–4 | Boston Bruins | Boston Garden | Recap |
| Jim Hamilton (3) – pp – 14:11 | | First period | 15:10 – pp – Jean Ratelle (1); 16:16 – Dwight Foster (1) |
| Orest Kindrachuk (3) – 14:52 | | Second period | 14:15 – Peter McNab (2) |
| Orest Kindrachuk (4) – 19:54 | | Third period | 10:10 – Bob Miller (1) |
| Denis Herron 21 saves / 25 shots | | Goalie stats | Gerry Cheevers 24 saves / 27 shots |

| April 21 | Boston Bruins | 2–1 | Pittsburgh Penguins | Civic Arena | Recap |
| Peter McNab (3) – 18:43 | | First period | 03:10 – Gary McAdam (2) |
| No scoring | | Second period | No scoring |
| Rick Middleton (1) – pp – 05:03 | | Third period | No scoring |
| Gerry Cheevers 23 saves / 24 shots | | Goalie stats | Denis Herron 29 saves / 31 shots |

| April 22 | Boston Bruins | 4–1 | Pittsburgh Penguins | Civic Arena | Recap |
| Bobby Schmautz (2) – 16:53; Jean Ratelle (2) – 18:46 | | First period | 15:20 – Rod Schutt (2) |
| No scoring | | Second period | No scoring |
| Jean Ratelle (3) – 08:50; Don Marcotte (3) – en – 19:19 | | Third period | No scoring |
| Gerry Cheevers 24 saves / 25 shots | | Goalie stats | Denis Herron 27 saves / 30 shots |

| Boston won series 4–0 |

=== (4) Philadelphia Flyers vs. (5) New York Rangers ===
This was the second playoff series meeting between these two teams. Philadelphia won the only previous meeting in seven games in the 1974 Stanley Cup semifinals.

| April 16 | New York Rangers | 2–3 | OT | Philadelphia Flyers | Spectrum | Recap |
| Don Maloney (1) – 04:32; Phil Esposito (3) – pp – 09:10 | | First period | | 16:52 – pp – Bob Kelly (1) |
| No scoring | | Second period | | No scoring |
| No scoring | | Third period | | 15:02 – Bill Barber (3) |
| No scoring | | First overtime period | | 00:44 – Ken Linseman (2) |
| John Davidson 29 saves / 32 shots | | Goalie stats | | Robbie Moore 22 saves / 24 shots |

| April 18 | New York Rangers | 7–1 | Philadelphia Flyers | Spectrum | Recap |
| Steve Vickers (2) – 02:21; Ron Greschner (2) – sh – 18:22 | | First period | 07:45 – Frank Bathe (1) |
| Don Maloney (2) – 02:32; Ron Greschner (3) – pp – 06:19; Eddie Johnstone (1) – 10:41 | | Second period | No scoring |
| Don Murdoch (1) – pp – 09:44; Mike McEwen (2) – pp – 17:18 | | Third period | No scoring |
| John Davidson 32 saves / 33 shots | | Goalie stats | Robbie Moore 13 saves / 17 shots Wayne Stephenson 16 saves / 19 shots |

| April 20 | Philadelphia Flyers | 1–5 | New York Rangers | Madison Square Garden | Recap |
| Mel Bridgman (1) – 01:38 | | First period | No scoring |
| No scoring | | Second period | 02:15 – Don Maloney (3); 02:41 – Don Maloney (4); 05:39 – sh – Anders Hedberg (1) |
| No scoring | | Third period | 14:17 – Ron Duguay (1); 19:48 – en – Don Murdoch (2) |
| Wayne Stephenson 20 saves / 24 shots | | Goalie stats | John Davidson 32 saves / 33 shots |

| April 22 | Philadelphia Flyers | 0–6 | New York Rangers | Madison Square Garden | Recap |
| No scoring | | First period | 03:43 – Don Murdoch (3); 06:33 – Eddie Johnstone (2) |
| No scoring | | Second period | 02:00 – Phil Esposito (4); 05:15 – Bobby Sheehan (1) |
| No scoring | | Third period | 06:58 – pp – Don Murdoch (4); 11:39 – sh – Eddie Johnstone (3) |
| Robbie Moore 24 saves / 30 shots | | Goalie stats | John Davidson 28 saves / 28 shots |

| April 24 | New York Rangers | 8–3 | Philadelphia Flyers | Spectrum | Recap |
| Ron Greschner (4) – pp – 09:55; Walt Tkaczuk (2) – sh – 13:26 | | First period | No scoring |
| No scoring | | Second period | No scoring |
| Walt Tkaczuk (3) – 02:03; Steve Vickers (3) – 04:13; Ron Duguay (2) – sh – en – 08:19; Carol Vadnais (1) – 16:50; Eddie Johnstone (4) – 17:24; Anders Hedberg (2) – en – 19:26 | | Third period | 10:37 – pp – Reggie Leach (5); 12:21 – Bob Dailey (1); 15:27 – Behn Wilson (1) |
| John Davidson 25 saves / 28 shots | | Goalie stats | Wayne Stephenson 15 saves / 21 shots |

| New York won series 4–1 |

== Semifinals ==
=== (1) New York Islanders vs. (4) New York Rangers ===
This was the second playoff series meeting between these two teams. The Islanders won the only previous meeting 2–1 in the 1975 Preliminary Round.

| April 26 | New York Rangers | 4–1 | New York Islanders | Nassau Coliseum | Recap |
| Don Murdoch (5) – pp – 15:01; Eddie Johnstone (5) – 17:57 | | First period | 10:41 – Bryan Trottier (2) |
| Ron Duguay (3) – 09:43; Bobby Sheehan (2) – 16:34 | | Second period | No scoring |
| No scoring | | Third period | No scoring |
| John Davidson 21 saves / 22 shots | | Goalie stats | Chico Resch 34 saves / 38 shots |

| April 28 | New York Rangers | 3–4 | OT | New York Islanders | Nassau Coliseum | Recap |
| Walt Tkaczuk (4) – 03:12 | | First period | | No scoring |
| Bobby Sheehan (3) – pp – 08:32 | | Second period | | 01:37 – Wayne Merrick (2) |
| Phil Esposito (5) – 15:48 | | Third period | | 05:13 – Bob Lorimer (1); 09:35 – Bob Nystrom (1) |
| No scoring | | First overtime period | | 08:02 – Denis Potvin (4) |
| John Davidson 33 saves / 37 shots | | Goalie stats | | Billy Smith 34 saves / 37 shots |

| May 1 | New York Islanders | 1–3 | New York Rangers | Madison Square Garden | Recap |
| No scoring | | First period | No scoring |
| Bob Bourne (1) – 14:04 | | Second period | 03:14 – Bobby Sheehan (4); 16:23 – Phil Esposito (6) |
| No scoring | | Third period | 13:55 – Steve Vickers (4) |
| Chico Resch 29 saves / 32 shots | | Goalie stats | John Davidson 16 saves / 17 shots |

| May 3 | New York Islanders | 3–2 | OT | New York Rangers | Madison Square Garden | Recap |
| No scoring | | First period | | No scoring |
| John Tonelli (1) – 01:53 | | Second period | | 01:18 – Don Maloney (5) |
| Billy Harris (2) – 02:56 | | Third period | | 06:50 – Don Maloney (6) |
| Bob Nystrom (2) – 03:40 | | First overtime period | | No scoring |
| Billy Smith 28 saves / 30 shots | | Goalie stats | | John Davidson 23 saves / 26 shots |

| May 5 | New York Rangers | 4–3 | New York Islanders | Nassau Coliseum | Recap |
| Don Maloney (7) – 15:29 | | First period | 17:48 – sh – Lorne Henning (2) |
| Lucien DeBlois (2) – 07:29 | | Second period | No scoring |
| Ron Greschner (5) – 09:04; Anders Hedberg (3) – 17:47 | | Third period | 04:20 – Mike Kaszycki (1); 09:33 – Bob Nystrom (3) |
| John Davidson 25 saves / 28 shots | | Goalie stats | Billy Smith 26 saves / 30 shots |

| May 8 | New York Islanders | 1–2 | New York Rangers | Madison Square Garden | Recap |
| Mike Bossy (6) – pp – 08:56 | | First period | No scoring |
| No scoring | | Second period | 05:03 – Don Murdoch (6); 08:45 – pp – Ron Greschner (6) |
| No scoring | | Third period | No scoring |
| Chico Resch 25 saves / 27 shots | | Goalie stats | John Davidson 21 saves / 22 shots |

| New York Rangers won series 4–2 |

=== (2) Montreal Canadiens vs. (3) Boston Bruins ===
This was the 18th playoff series meeting between these two teams, which Montreal led 15–2 in previous meetings. This series served as the final chapter in this rivalry for the late 1970s following Montreal's Cup Final victories over Boston in 1977 and 1978 in four and six games respectively.

This series is best remembered for its dramatic conclusion in the late stages of game seven. Boston's Rick Middleton scored the go-ahead goal with four minutes remaining in regulation. Montreal's dynasty and success over Boston in the playoffs were suddenly in serious jeopardy. However, with time winding down to less than three minutes remaining, Boston committed a series-defining penalty for having too many men on the ice. With Montreal on the power play, Guy Lafleur scored the game-tying goal with 1:14 remaining to force overtime. Approaching the midway point of the first overtime, Yvon Lambert would score the series-winning goal to send the Canadiens to the Stanley Cup Final for the fourth straight year. This marked the 14th straight playoff meeting between the two teams that ended with the Canadiens defeating the Bruins.

| April 26 | Boston Bruins | 2–4 | Montreal Canadiens | Montreal Forum | Recap |
| No scoring | | First period | 13:52 – Jacques Lemaire (5) |
| Jean Ratelle (4) – pp – 03:37; Don Marcotte (4) – 05:34 | | Second period | No scoring |
| No scoring | | Third period | 03:44 – Guy Lafleur (3); 12:17 – Pierre Larouche (1); 19:33 – en – Doug Jarvis (1) |
| Gerry Cheevers 17 saves / 20 shots | | Goalie stats | Ken Dryden 19 saves / 21 shots |

| April 28 | Boston Bruins | 2–5 | Montreal Canadiens | Montreal Forum | Recap |
| No scoring | | First period | No scoring |
| Rick Middleton (2) – 07:42; Peter McNab (4) – 10:34 | | Second period | 17:41 – Jacques Lemaire (6); 18:11 – Bob Gainey (3); 19:05 – Mario Tremblay (1) |
| No scoring | | Third period | 04:50 – Guy Lafleur (4); 15:43 – Rick Chartraw (1) |
| Gerry Cheevers 15 saves / 20 shots | | Goalie stats | Ken Dryden 21 saves / 23 shots |

| May 1 | Montreal Canadiens | 1–2 | Boston Bruins | Boston Garden | Recap |
| No scoring | | First period | 12:19 – Stan Jonathan (1) |
| No scoring | | Second period | No scoring |
| Larry Robinson (4) – 13:23 | | Third period | 16:48 – Brad Park (1) |
| Ken Dryden 29 saves / 31 shots | | Goalie stats | Gilles Gilbert 17 saves / 18 shots |

| May 3 | Montreal Canadiens | 3–4 | OT | Boston Bruins | Boston Garden | Recap |
| Pierre Mondou (2) – pp – 18:59 | | First period | | 15:15 – Jean Ratelle (5) |
| Guy Lafleur (5) – 07:58 | | Second period | | 13:21 – Jean Ratelle (6) |
| Guy Lapointe (1) – 17:54 | | Third period | | 16:18 – Peter McNab (5) |
| No scoring | | First overtime period | | 03:46 – Jean Ratelle (7) |
| Ken Dryden 28 saves / 32 shots | | Goalie stats | | Gilles Gilbert 21 saves / 24 shots |

| May 5 | Boston Bruins | 1–5 | Montreal Canadiens | Montreal Forum | Recap |
| No scoring | | First period | 08:35 – Guy Lafleur (6); 09:00 – Guy Lafleur (7); 19:02 – Larry Robinson (5) |
| No scoring | | Second period | No scoring |
| Wayne Cashman (1) – pp – 18:32 | | Third period | 10:03 – pp – Serge Savard (1); 12:00 – Mario Tremblay (2) |
| Gilles Gilbert 35 saves / 40 shots | | Goalie stats | Ken Dryden 21 saves / 22 shots |

| May 8 | Montreal Canadiens | 2–5 | Boston Bruins | Boston Garden | Recap |
| Larry Robinson (6) – 08:05; Pierre Mondou (3) – 12:48 | | First period | 10:02 – Stan Jonathan (2); 12:21 – Don Marcotte (5) |
| No scoring | | Second period | 16:30 – Wayne Cashman (2) |
| No scoring | | Third period | 07:23 – Stan Jonathan (3); 15:24 – Stan Jonathan (4) |
| Ken Dryden 18 saves / 23 shots | | Goalie stats | Gilles Gilbert 25 saves / 27 shots |

| May 10 | Boston Bruins | 4–5 | OT | Montreal Canadiens | Montreal Forum | Recap |
| Rick Middleton (3) – pp – 10:09 | | First period | | 14:19 – pp – Jacques Lemaire (7) |
| Wayne Cashman (3) – 00:27; Wayne Cashman (4) – 16:12 | | Second period | | No scoring |
| Rick Middleton (4) – 16:01 | | Third period | | 06:10 – Mark Napier (2); 08:16 – pp – Guy Lapointe (2); 18:46 – pp – Guy Lafleur (8) |
| No scoring | | First overtime period | | 09:33 – Yvon Lambert (3) |
| Gilles Gilbert 47 saves / 52 shots | | Goalie stats | | Ken Dryden 26 saves / 30 shots |

| Montreal won series 4–3 |

== Stanley Cup Final ==
This was the 12th playoff series (and only Final) meeting between these two teams. New York led 6–5 in previous meetings. Their last encounter was won by New York in six games in the 1974 Stanley Cup quarterfinals.

Prior to 2013, this was the last time two Original Six clubs met in the Final. Both teams would next appear in the Stanley Cup Final as follows: Canadiens winning in 1986 and 1993, Rangers winning in 1994.

| May 13 | New York Rangers | 4–1 | Montreal Canadiens | Montreal Forum | Recap |
| Steve Vickers (5) – pp – 06:28; Ron Greschner (7) – 14:27 | | First period | No scoring |
| Phil Esposito (7) – pp – 09:30; Dave Maloney (3) – sh – 12:32 | | Second period | 07:07 – Guy Lafleur (9) |
| No scoring | | Third period | No scoring |
| John Davidson 31 saves / 32 shots | | Goalie stats | Ken Dryden 9 saves / 13 shots Michel Larocque 9 saves / 9 shots |

| May 15 | New York Rangers | 2–6 | Montreal Canadiens | Montreal Forum | Recap |
| Anders Hedberg (4) – 01:02; Ron Duguay (4) – 06:21 | | First period | 08:34 – Yvon Lambert (4); 12:24 – Guy Lafleur (10); 16:27 – Bob Gainey (4) |
| No scoring | | Second period | 06:51 – Steve Shutt (3); 17:35 – pp – Jacques Lemaire (8) |
| No scoring | | Third period | 04:38 – Mark Napier (3) |
| John Davidson 27 saves / 33 shots | | Goalie stats | Ken Dryden 23 saves / 25 shots |

| May 17 | Montreal Canadiens | 4–1 | New York Rangers | Madison Square Garden | Recap |
| Steve Shutt (4) – pp – 07:27; Doug Risebrough (1) – 15:44 | | First period | No scoring |
| No scoring | | Second period | No scoring |
| Mario Tremblay (3) – 14:48; Jacques Lemaire (9) – 17:10 | | Third period | 06:06 – Ron Duguay (5) |
| Ken Dryden 19 saves / 20 shots | | Goalie stats | John Davidson 19 saves / 23 shots |

| May 19 | Montreal Canadiens | 4–3 | OT | New York Rangers | Madison Square Garden | Recap |
| Rejean Houle (1) – 02:39 | | First period | | 01:19 – Pat Hickey (1); 17:03 – Don Murdoch (7) |
| Yvon Lambert (5) – 18:05 | | Second period | | No scoring |
| Bob Gainey (5) – 06:27 | | Third period | | 04:26 – Phil Esposito (8) |
| Serge Savard (2) – 07:25 | | First overtime period | | No scoring |
| Ken Dryden 18 saves / 21 shots | | Goalie stats | | John Davidson 38 saves / 42 shots |

| May 21 | New York Rangers | 1–4 | Montreal Canadiens | Montreal Forum | Recap |
| Carol Vadnais (2) – 16:52 | | First period | 10:36 – Rick Chartraw (2) |
| No scoring | | Second period | 01:02 – pp – Jacques Lemaire (10); 11:01 – Bob Gainey (6); 18:49 – Jacques Lemaire (11) |
| No scoring | | Third period | No scoring |
| John Davidson 27 saves / 31 shots | | Goalie stats | Ken Dryden 14 saves / 15 shots |

| Montreal won series 4–1 |

== See also ==
- 1978–79 NHL season
- List of NHL seasons
- List of Stanley Cup champions

| Preceded by 1978 Stanley Cup playoffs | Stanley Cup playoffs 1979 | Succeeded by 1980 Stanley Cup playoffs |
