= Conn Smythe Trophy =

Ice hockey award

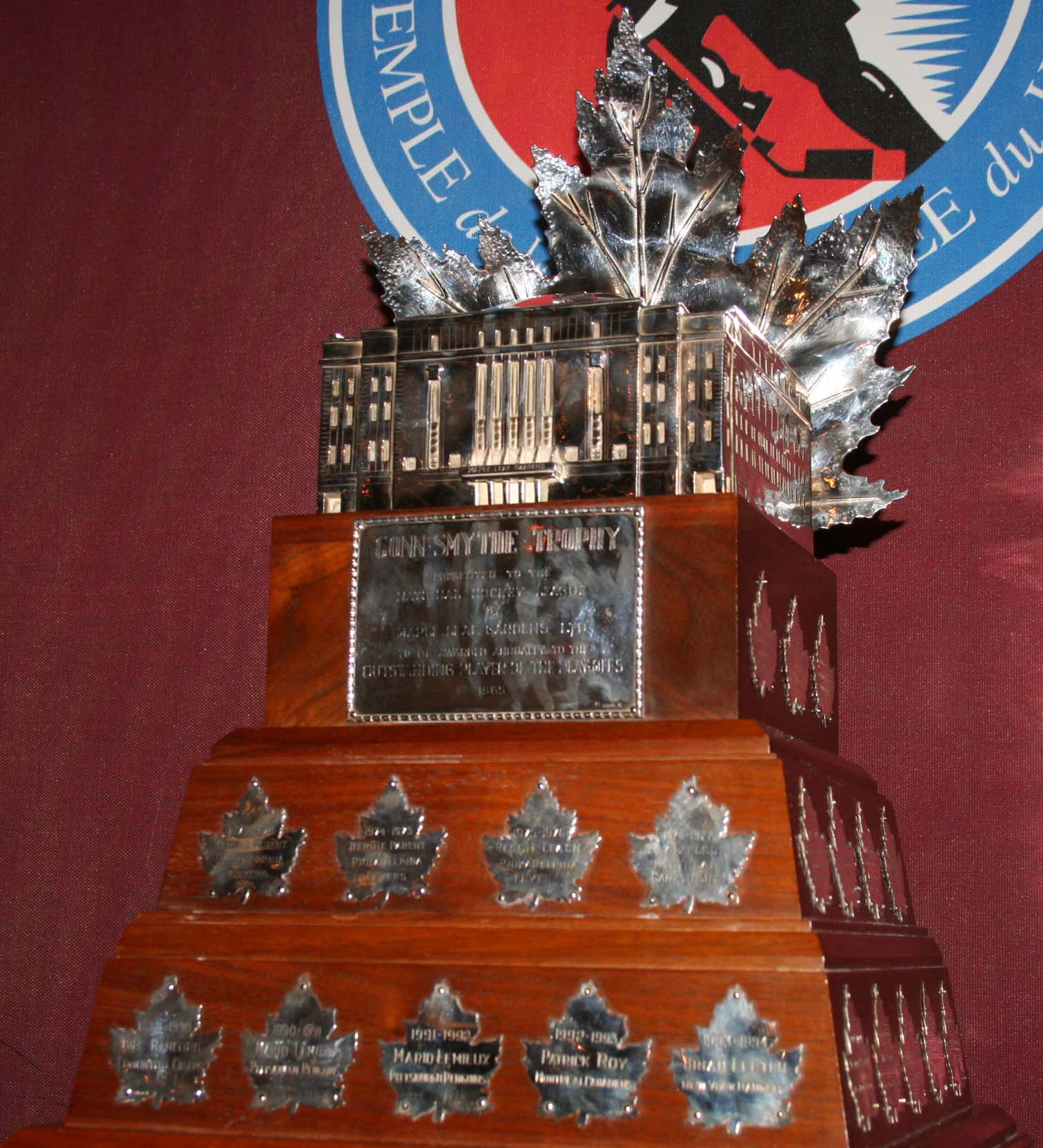
- Sport: Ice hockey
- League: National Hockey League
- Awarded for: "Most valuable player for his team" in the Stanley Cup Playoffs

History
- First award: 1964–65 NHL season
- First winner: Jean Beliveau
- Most wins: Patrick Roy (3)
- Most recent: Jordan Staal; Carolina Hurricanes (2026)

The Conn Smythe Trophy (French: Trophée Conn-Smythe) is awarded annually to the most valuable player (MVP) of his team during the National Hockey League's (NHL) Stanley Cup playoffs. It is named after Conn Smythe, the longtime owner, general manager, and head coach of the Toronto Maple Leafs. The Conn Smythe Trophy has been awarded 54 times to 47 players since the 1964–65 NHL season. Each year, at the conclusion of the final game of the Stanley Cup Final, members of the Professional Hockey Writers' Association vote to elect the player deserving of the trophy. The trophy is handed out by the NHL Commissioner before the presentation of the Stanley Cup and only the winner is announced, in contrast to most of the other NHL awards which name three finalists and are presented at a ceremony. Vote tallies for the Conn Smythe Trophy were released starting in 2017.

Unlike the playoff MVP awards presented in the other major professional sports leagues of the United States and Canada (the Super Bowl MVP, the NBA Finals MVP, the MLS Cup MVP and the World Series MVP), but similar to the Babe Ruth Award, and also the Professional Women's Hockey League Playoff MVP award, the Conn Smythe is based on a player's performance during the entire NHL postseason instead of just the championship game or series.

The most recent winner of the trophy is Jordan Staal, who won it with the Carolina Hurricanes in the 2026 Stanley Cup Final.

== History ==
=== Trophy ===
The Conn Smythe Trophy was introduced in 1964 by Maple Leaf Gardens Limited to honour Conn Smythe, the former owner, general manager and coach of the Toronto Maple Leafs and a member of the Hockey Hall of Fame as a builder. The centrepiece of the trophy is a stylized silver replica of Maple Leaf Gardens, the arena built under Smythe's ownership of the Maple Leafs, and their home from 1931 to 1999. Backing the arena replica is a large silver botanically accurate maple leaf. The arena replica and leaf are set atop a square wooden foundation, the front of which bears a dedication plaque. Additional tiers below the foundation, sloping outward, contain maple leaf-shaped plates bearing the inscriptions of the winners' names.

The base of the Conn Smythe Trophy has been expanded twice over the years to accommodate more winners. Although the 16 nameplates on the original base tier were filled up after 1980, a new tier was not added until the 1983–84 season. Following the 2000 Stanley Cup playoffs, the 20 nameplates on the new tier were filled, so the first nine winners' nameplates were moved up to the remaining three sides of the foundation tier. The remaining nameplates were shifted accordingly to keep the winners in chronological order. Due to the cancellation of the 2004–05 season, the trophy was not filled again until 2010, after which a new tier was added, making room for 24 more names.

=== Winners ===
The first winner of the trophy was centre Jean Beliveau of the Montreal Canadiens in 1965. The first player and only defenseman to win it twice was Bobby Orr, who scored the Cup-clinching goals for the Boston Bruins in 1970 and 1972. Goaltender Bernie Parent (for the Philadelphia Flyers) and centres Wayne Gretzky (for the Edmonton Oilers), Mario Lemieux, and Sidney Crosby (for the Pittsburgh Penguins) have also won it twice each, with Parent, Lemieux, and Crosby each winning theirs back to back (1974/1975, 1991/1992, and 2016/2017 respectively). Goaltender Patrick Roy is the only three-time Smythe winner and the only player to win the trophy as a member of two different teams (with the Canadiens in 1986 and 1993, and with the Colorado Avalanche in 2001); his wins also fall into three different decades. Ken Dryden, the 1971 Smythe winner, is the only NHL player to win this trophy before winning the Calder Trophy as rookie of the year (in 1972): Montreal called him up to play only six regular season games. Dave Keon is the only Maple Leafs player to win the trophy donated by his club's parent company, while his eight playoff points in 1967 is the fewest ever by a non-goalie Conn Smythe winner as he was a defensive forward.

Though the trophy rewards a player who performed particularly well over the entirety of the playoffs, it has never been given to a player whose team did not at least reach the Stanley Cup Final. The trophy has been awarded to members of the team that lost the Finals six times, most recently Connor McDavid of the Edmonton Oilers in 2024. The only two skaters to win the award while his team lost the final round are McDavid and Philadelphia's Reggie Leach, the latter of which won it in 1976, as he had set a league record for most goals in the playoffs (19), which included a five-goal game in the semifinals and four goals in the Finals, even though the Canadiens swept his Flyers. McDavid set the all-time playoff record for assists in 2024 and led the playoffs in scoring by ten points, despite the Florida Panthers defeating his Oilers in seven games.

Ten players born outside of Canada have won the Conn Smythe Trophy. The non-Canadian winners are Americans Brian Leetch, who won it in 1994, Tim Thomas in 2011, Jonathan Quick in 2012, and Patrick Kane in 2013; Russians Evgeni Malkin, Alexander Ovechkin and Andrei Vasilevskiy who won it in 2009, 2018 and 2021, respectively; and Swedes Nicklas Lidstrom, Henrik Zetterberg and Victor Hedman, who won it in 2002, 2008 and 2020, respectively.

Three players have won the Conn Smythe Trophy and the Hart Memorial Trophy for Most Valuable Player during the regular season in the same year: Orr in 1970 and 1972, Guy Lafleur in 1977, and Wayne Gretzky in 1985. These three players also won the Art Ross Trophy, having scored more points than any other player during the regular season (Orr only in 1970), while Orr also won the James Norris Memorial Trophy as top defenceman to give him a record four individual original NHL awards in 1970.

As of 2026, the Conn Smythe Trophy has been awarded to centers 22 times, to goaltenders 17 times, to defencemen 12 times, and to right wingers eight times, while the only left wingers to have won the award are Bob Gainey of Montreal in 1979 and Alexander Ovechkin of Washington in 2018. Players with the Montreal Canadiens have received the most Conn Smythe Trophies with nine. Players with the Detroit Red Wings, Pittsburgh Penguins, and Edmonton Oilers have each received five, and the Philadelphia Flyers and New York Islanders have each received four.

== Winners ==
Positions key
C	Centre
LW	Left wing
D	Defence
RW	Right wing
G	Goaltender

Player is active in the NHL (‡)
Player is inducted in the Hockey Hall of Fame
Player is not yet eligible for the Hockey Hall of Fame
Player's team lost the Stanley Cup Final (§)

Conn Smythe Trophy winners
Year	Winner	Team	Position	Win #
1965	Jean Beliveau	Montreal Canadiens	C	1
1966	Roger Crozier	Detroit Red Wings^{§}	G	1
1967	Dave Keon	Toronto Maple Leafs	C	1
1968	Glenn Hall	St. Louis Blues^{§}	G	1
1969	Serge Savard	Montreal Canadiens	D	1
1970	Bobby Orr	Boston Bruins	D	1
1971	Ken Dryden	Montreal Canadiens	G	1
1972	Bobby Orr	Boston Bruins	D	2
1973	Yvan Cournoyer	Montreal Canadiens	RW	1
1974	Bernie Parent	Philadelphia Flyers	G	1
1975	Bernie Parent	Philadelphia Flyers	G	2
1976	Reggie Leach	Philadelphia Flyers^{§}	RW	1
1977	Guy Lafleur	Montreal Canadiens	RW	1
1978	Larry Robinson	Montreal Canadiens	D	1
1979	Bob Gainey	Montreal Canadiens	LW	1
1980	Bryan Trottier	New York Islanders	C	1
1981	Butch Goring	New York Islanders	C	1
1982	Mike Bossy	New York Islanders	RW	1
1983	Billy Smith	New York Islanders	G	1
1984	Mark Messier	Edmonton Oilers	C	1
1985	Wayne Gretzky	Edmonton Oilers	C	1
1986	Patrick Roy	Montreal Canadiens	G	1
1987	Ron Hextall	Philadelphia Flyers^{§}	G	1
1988	Wayne Gretzky	Edmonton Oilers	C	2
1989	Al MacInnis	Calgary Flames	D	1
1990	Bill Ranford	Edmonton Oilers	G	1
1991	Mario Lemieux	Pittsburgh Penguins	C	1
1992	Mario Lemieux	Pittsburgh Penguins	C	2
1993	Patrick Roy	Montreal Canadiens	G	2
1994	Brian Leetch	New York Rangers	D	1
1995	Claude Lemieux	New Jersey Devils	RW	1
1996	Joe Sakic	Colorado Avalanche	C	1
1997	Mike Vernon	Detroit Red Wings	G	1
1998	Steve Yzerman	Detroit Red Wings	C	1
1999	Joe Nieuwendyk	Dallas Stars	C	1
2000	Scott Stevens	New Jersey Devils	D	1
2001	Patrick Roy	Colorado Avalanche	G	3
2002	Nicklas Lidstrom	Detroit Red Wings	D	1
2003	Jean-Sebastien Giguere	Mighty Ducks of Anaheim^{§}	G	1
2004	Brad Richards	Tampa Bay Lightning	C	1
2005	Season cancelled due to the 2004–05 NHL lockout			
2006	Cam Ward	Carolina Hurricanes	G	1
2007	Scott Niedermayer	Anaheim Ducks	D	1
2008	Henrik Zetterberg	Detroit Red Wings	C	1
2009	Evgeni Malkin^{‡}	Pittsburgh Penguins	C	1
2010	Jonathan Toews	Chicago Blackhawks	C	1
2011	Tim Thomas	Boston Bruins	G	1
2012	Jonathan Quick	Los Angeles Kings	G	1
2013	Patrick Kane^{‡}	Chicago Blackhawks	RW	1
2014	Justin Williams	Los Angeles Kings	RW	1
2015	Duncan Keith	Chicago Blackhawks	D	1
2016	Sidney Crosby^{‡}	Pittsburgh Penguins	C	1
2017	Sidney Crosby^{‡}	Pittsburgh Penguins	C	2
2018	Alexander Ovechkin^{‡}	Washington Capitals	LW	1
2019	Ryan O'Reilly^{‡}	St. Louis Blues	C	1
2020	Victor Hedman^{‡}	Tampa Bay Lightning	D	1
2021	Andrei Vasilevskiy^{‡}	Tampa Bay Lightning	G	1
2022	Cale Makar^{‡}	Colorado Avalanche	D	1
2023	Jonathan Marchessault^{‡}	Vegas Golden Knights	RW	1
2024	Connor McDavid^{‡}	Edmonton Oilers^{§}	C	1
2025	Sam Bennett^{‡}	Florida Panthers	C	1
2026	Jordan Staal^{‡}	Carolina Hurricanes	C	1

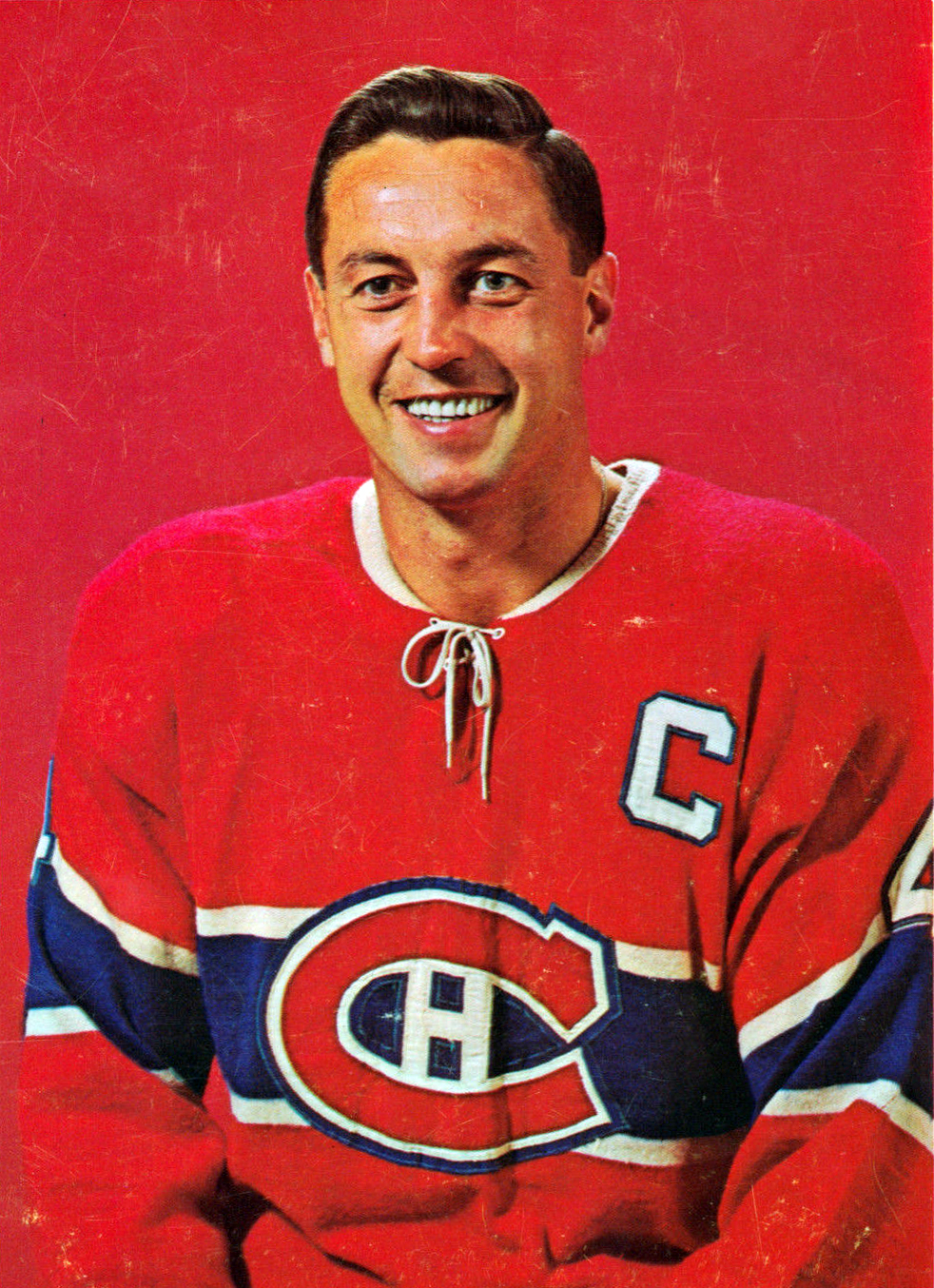
Jean Beliveau, first recipient of the award, in 1965

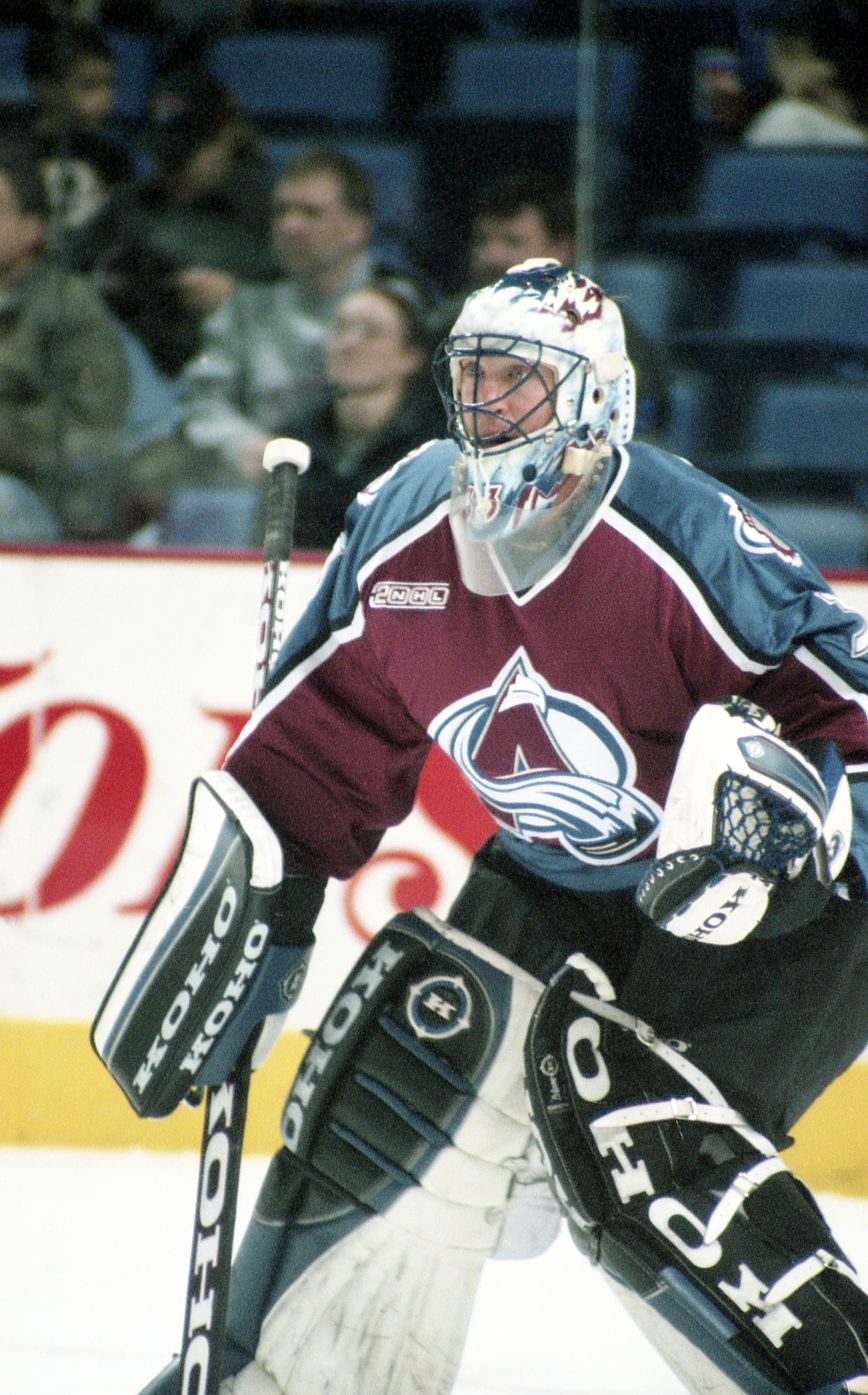
Patrick Roy, the only three-time winner and, as of 2025, the only player in NHL history to win the award with more than one team

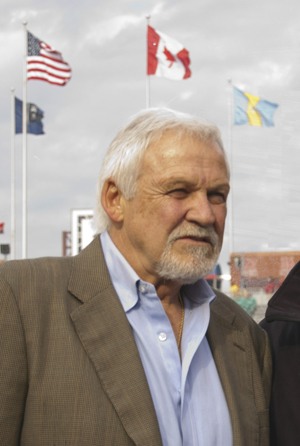
Bernie Parent, two-time winner and the first player to win the award in consecutive years

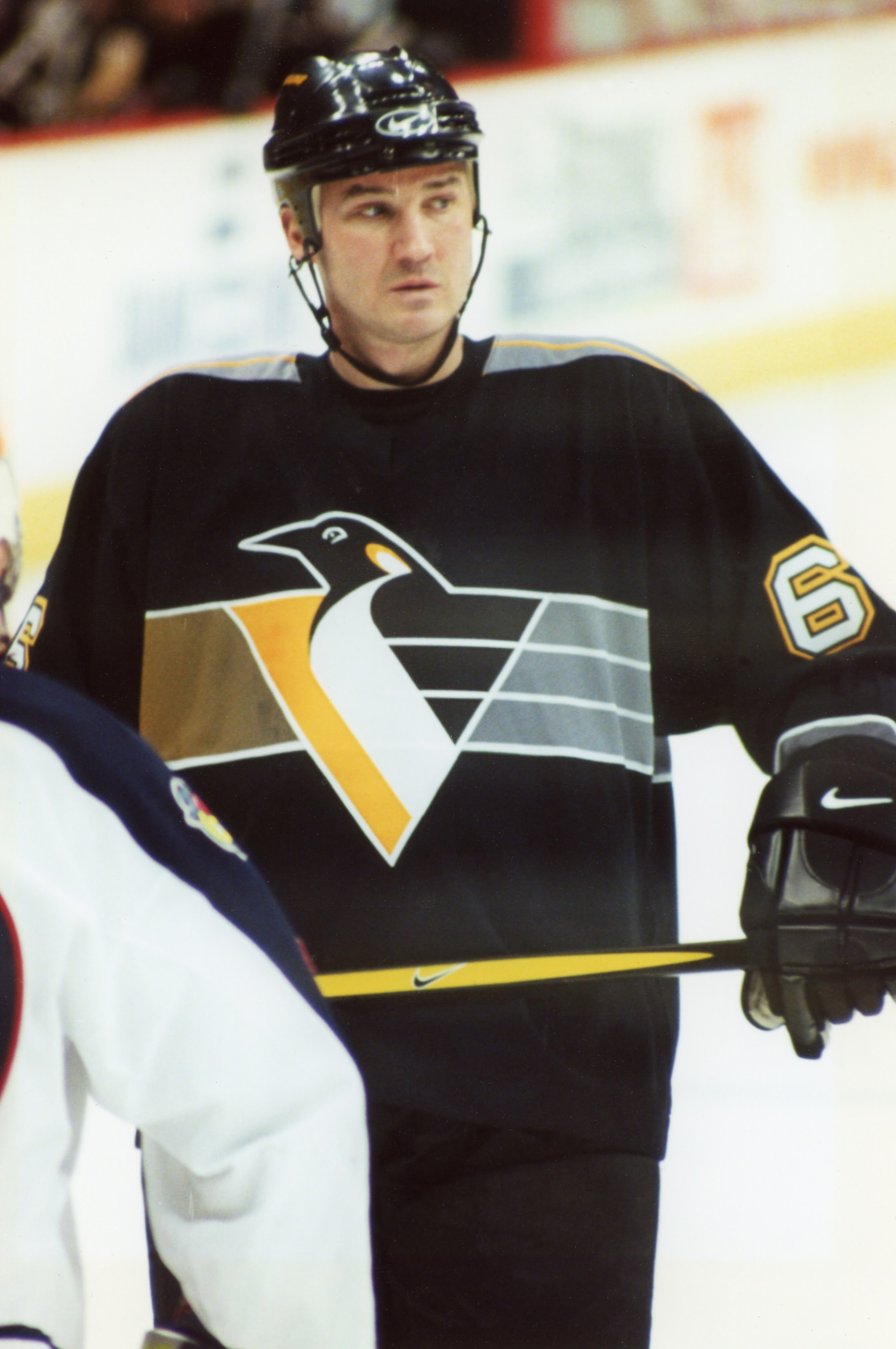
Mario Lemieux, two-time winner and the second player to win the award in consecutive years

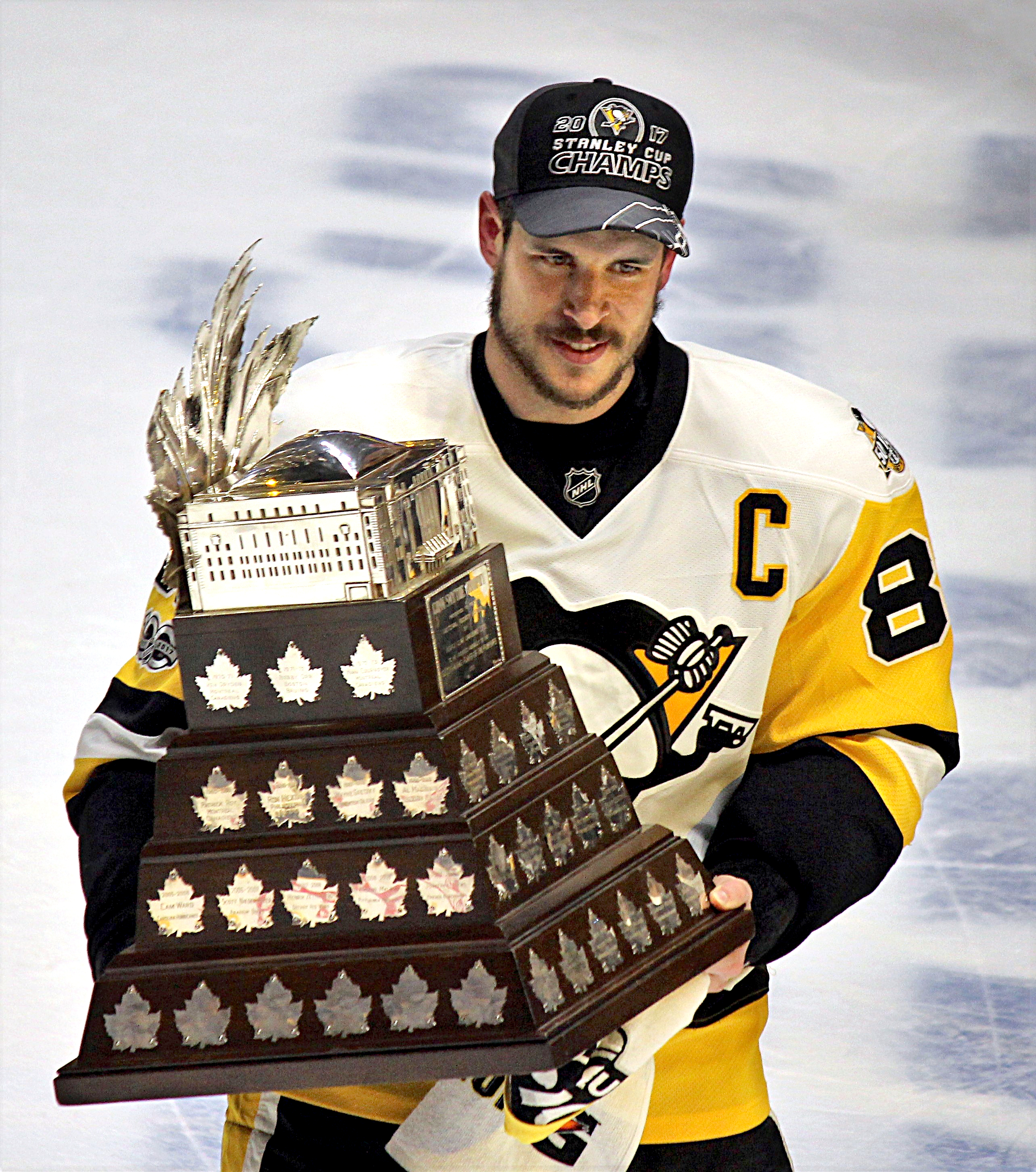
Sidney Crosby with the trophy, two-time winner and third player to win the award in consecutive years

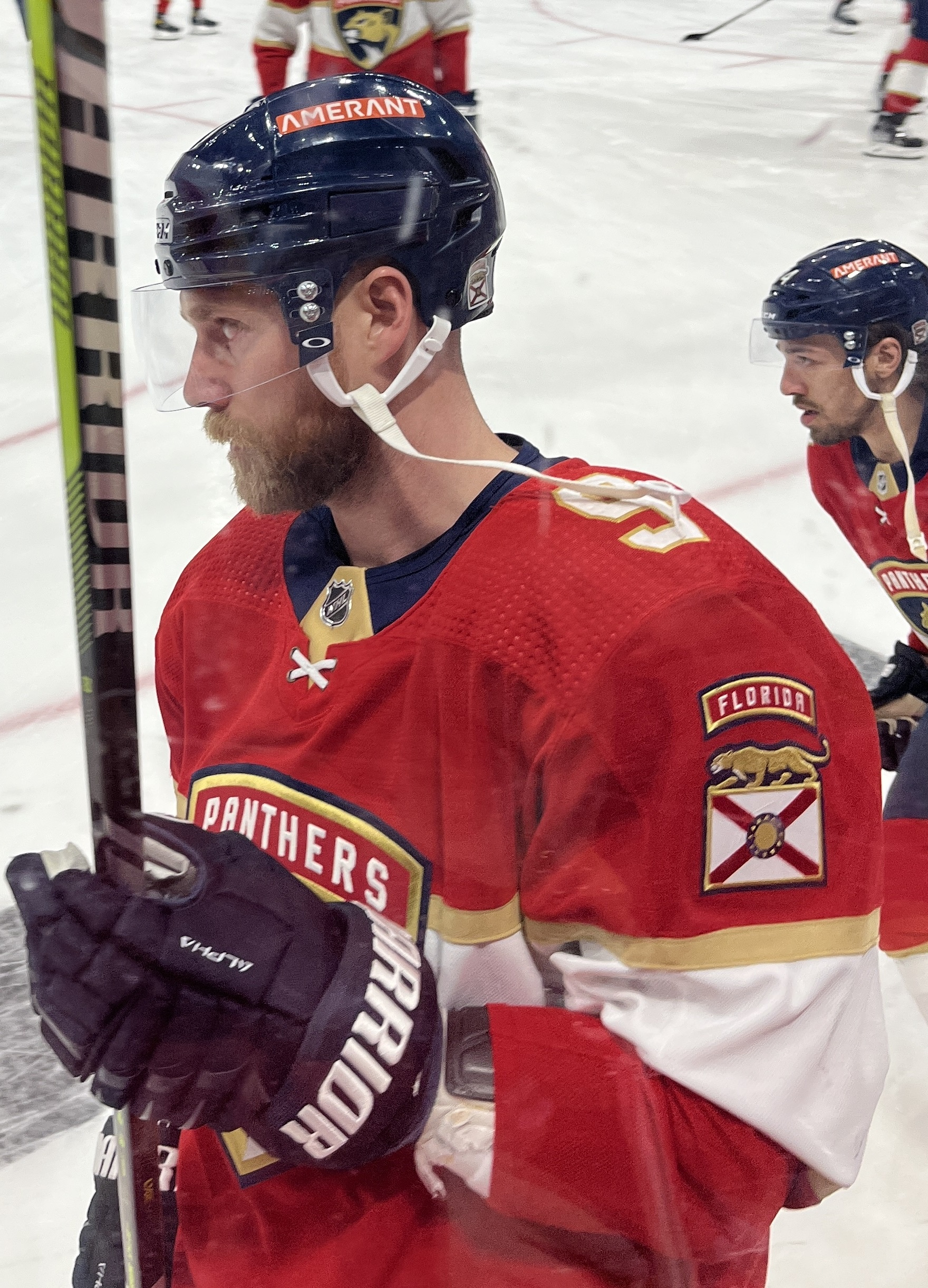
Sam Bennett, the 2025 winner

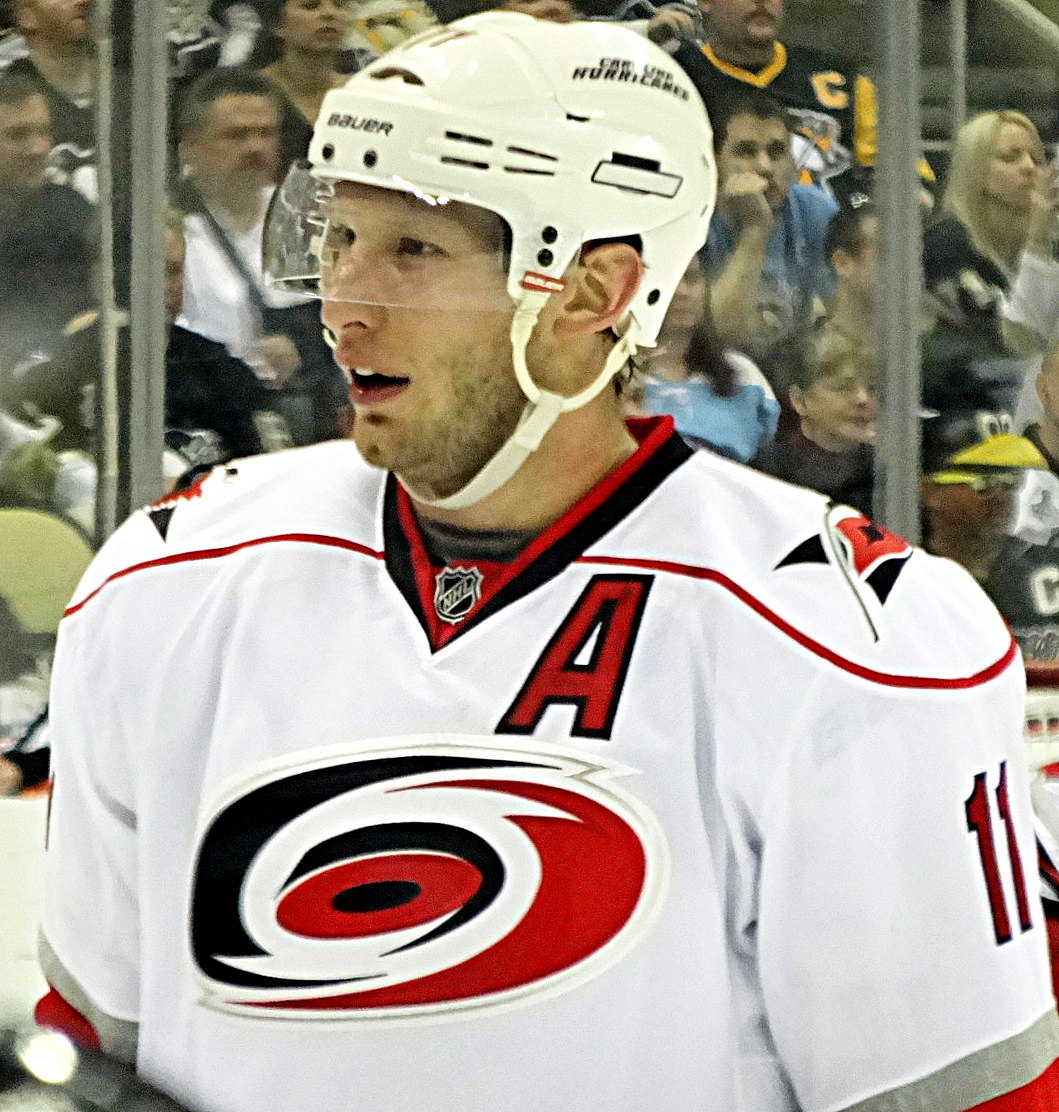
Jordan Staal, the 2026 winner

== See also ==
- List of National Hockey League awards
- List of NHL statistical leaders
- List of Stanley Cup champions
