= Gilles Gilbert =

Canadian ice hockey player (1949–2023)

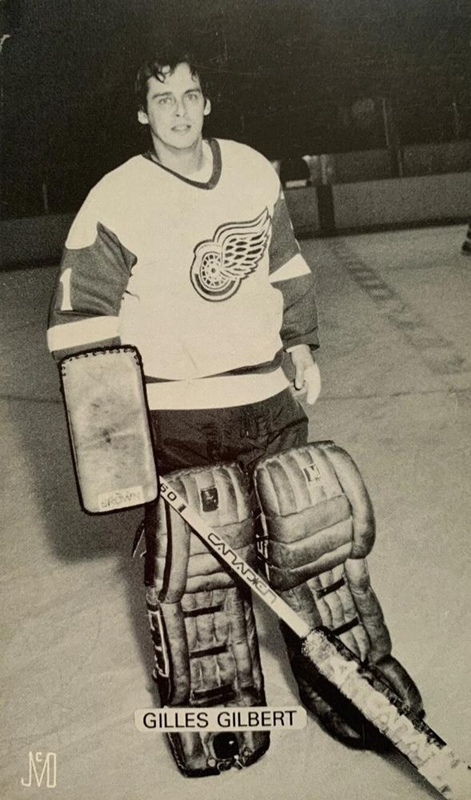
- Gilbert in 1980s postcard
- Born: March 31, 1949 Saint-Esprit, Limoilou, Quebec, Canada
- Died: August 6, 2023 (aged 74) Quebec City, Quebec, Canada
- Height: 6 ft 1 in (185 cm)
- Weight: 175 lb (79 kg; 12 st 7 lb)
- Position: Goaltender
- Caught: Left
- Played for: Minnesota North Stars; Boston Bruins; Detroit Red Wings
- NHL draft: 25th overall, 1969; Minnesota North Stars
- Playing career: 1969–1983

Gilles Gilbert (March 31, 1949 – August 6, 2023) was a Canadian professional goaltender in ice hockey who was drafted in the third round of the 1969 NHL Amateur Draft from the London Knights. He played in the National Hockey League (NHL) for the Minnesota North Stars and Detroit Red Wings, but most notably for the Boston Bruins.

== Playing career ==
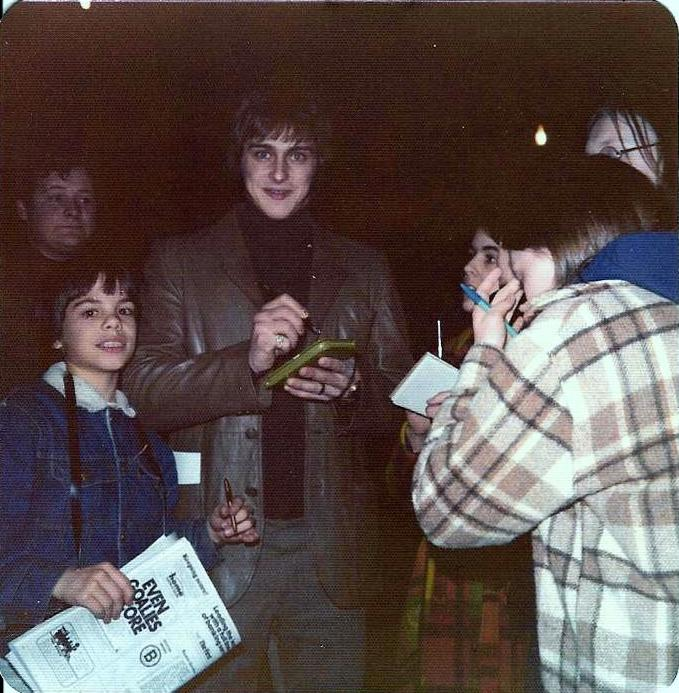
Gilbert signing autographs for fans in 1975

=== Early years ===
Gilles Gilbert was born on March 31, 1949, in Saint-Esprit, a small rural municipality in Quebec, Canada, to French-Canadian parents. He played in the 1961 Quebec International Pee-Wee Hockey Tournament with the junior Quebec Aces.

Gilles Gilbert played his junior hockey for the Trois-Rivières Reds in the Quebec Junior Hockey League (QJHL), appearing in 43 games with a 4.44 goals-against average (GAA) and a 23-18-2 record the team had a competitive season and Gilbert made 5 appearances in the 1967 Memorial Cup playoffs as the Quebec representatives (under the name Thetford Mines Canadiens banner), however they were eliminated in the semifinals. In the 1967-68 season, Gilbert remained with the Trois-Rivières Reds, appearing in 46 games and improving his performance to a 4.30 GAA, At age 18, he led all goalies in QJHL with six playoff wins for Trois-Rivieres in 1967.

=== Minnesota North Stars (1969-1972) ===
Following his junior career Gilbert was drafted by the Minnesota North Stars in 1969. He spent almost the entire 1969-70 season with the clubs CHL affiliate the Iowa Stars, in 39 games he would go 17-16-5 with a 3.25 GAA. That year he helped the Stars reach the Adams Cup where they were defeated by the Omaha Knights 4-1. During the year he also made his first NHL appearance of February 8, 1970 vs. the Pittsburgh Penguins where he lost 6-3. Gilbert then joined Minnesota for good the following year serving in a back up role to Cesare Maniago. He got his first career NHL victory vs. Montreal Canadiens on October 21, 1970 at Montreal Forum in a 3-1 victory. He finished the year appearing in 17 games going 5-9-2.

During the 1971-72 Gilbert only appeared in four games for the North Stars going 1-2-1. He spent the rest of that season playing in the AHL for the Cleveland Barons. In a starting role Gilbert went 20-15-5 recording 2 shutouts and a 3.62 GAA. The Barons made the postseason that year however they were eliminated in the first round by the Baltimore Clippers 4-2. Gilbert was called back to the North Stars for the 1972–73 season once again in a back up role. He recorded his 1st NHL shutout vs New York Islanders on November 11, 1972 in a 3-0 North Stars win. In total Gilbert started 22 games accumulating a 10-10-2 record a 3.05 GAA and a 0.904 SV%. Gilbert made his postseason debut which was a loss and the North Stars were eliminated in the first round by Philadelphia.

During his time with the North Stars, Gilles additionally played shortstop on a semi-pro baseball team.

=== Boston Bruins (1973-1980) ===
In 1973-74, Gilbert was traded to the Boston Bruins as a replacement for Gerry Cheevers who had gone to the World Hockey Association (WHA). Gilbert's arrival immediately boosted the Bruins while sinking the North Stars whose general manager was later fired as a result of that trade. Gilbert would go on to have a tremendous season in a starting role for the first time in his career he would boast a 34-12-8 record. This resulted in him playing in the NHL All-Star Game. Additionally, Gilbert had a career high 6 shutouts and finished the year with a 2.95 GAA and a .900 SV%. Gilbert started all 16 playoff games for the Bruins that helping them reach the 1974 Stanley Cup Final. However, he and the Bruins lost the Finals series 4-2 to the Philadelphia Flyers, but over these six games Gilbert played as brilliantly as his opposing counterpart Bernie Parent who was named playoff MVP.

Gilbert remained the Bruins main goalie the following year in 1974-75 appearing in 53 games for the Bruins he compiled a 23-17-11 record, along with 3 shutouts however his GAA went up to 3.13 and SV% dropped to 8.93. He and the Bruins were defeated in the first round of the playoffs by Chicago 2-1. Gilbert had another great year during the 1975–76 NHL season, when he set the NHL record for most consecutive wins by a goaltender with 17, and finished with a 33-8-10 record for a .843 winning percentage in 55 games. He also finished with 3 shutouts a 2.90 GAA (his best as a starter) and a .887 SV%. He and the Bruins defeated Los Angeles in the first round before being defeated by Philadelphia in the semifinals.

At the end of the 1975-76 season Gerry Cheevers had returned to the Bruins and from 1976-1980 he and Gilbert would form one of the best goaltending duos in the NHL. Due to him splitting time with Cheevers, Gilbert only appeared in 34 games for the Bruins during the 1976-77 NHL season going 18-13-3, with a 2.85 GAA and .884 SV%. Gilbert only appeared in 1 playoff game as Cheevers led the Bruins to the 1977 Stanley Cup where they were defeated by Montreal 4-0. During the 1977-78 season both Gilbert and Cheevers took a back seat to Ron Grahame. Only starting 23 games for the Bruins that year Gilbert went 15-6-2 with 2 shutouts and a career low 2.53 GAA. He did not appear at all during the postseason as the Bruins were defeated by Montreal in the Stanley Cup Final 4-2.

By the start of the 1978-79 season Gilbert remained in a backup role, in 23 games Gilbert went 12-8-2 with a 2.54 GAA and a .869 SV%. During the postseason Gilbert was the Bruins goalie during the 1979 Stanley Cup playoffs semifinal game 7 against the Montreal Canadiens, when Guy Lafleur tied the game after the infamous too many men penalty against Boston, and then Yvon Lambert scored the series-winning goal in overtime; Gilbert was still named the game's first star. Cheevers was benched after losing the first two games of the series, and Gilbert took over as the starter thereafter, overall being named the game's first star three times in the five games against Montreal. Montreal's Steve Shutt exclaimed of these performances that “Gilles Gilbert stood on his head. He was the reason they got to the seventh game”.

Gilbert's final season with the Bruins came in 1979-80 where he appeared in 33 games boasting a 20-9-3 record with a 2.73 GAA and a .890 SV%, as he and Cheevers finished runners up for the Vezina Trophy, which was won by Don Edwards and Bob Sauvé of the Buffalo Sabres. Gilbert did not appear in the postseason and the Bruins were eliminated in the second round.

Gilbert recorded 17 playoff victories for Boston. As of 2019, he ranks sixth in all-time playoff wins among Boston goaltenders. He also set the Bruins record for most assists by a goaltender in one singular postseason with 3. He also holds the record for most assist by a Bruins goalie in the postseason, with 4. He is still remembered fondly by Bruins fans for his 7 great seasons with the team and all of his acrobatic saves. As a result, in 2023, he would be named one of the 100 best Bruins players of all time.

=== Detroit Red Wings (1980-1983) ===
In July of 1980 Gilbert was traded to the Detroit Red Wings for Rogie Vachon. During the 1980-81 season Gilbert served as the Red Wings starting goalie appearing in 48 games for a mediocre Wings team he went 11-24-9, with a 4.01 GAA and .866 SV%. Gilbert was in net for Detroit on February 11, 1982, when the Vancouver Canucks became the first team with two successful penalty shots in the same game, as Thomas Gradin and Ivan Hlinka scored for the Canucks in the third period of a 4-4 tie. He served in a backup role for the red wings for his final two seasons going 10-24-7 ultimately retiring after the 1982-83 season putting an end to his NHL career that lasted over a decade.

Gilbert played in the NHL between 1969 and 1983 and retired with a record of 192-143-60 and a 3.27 goals against average.

== Post-playing career ==
Gilbert was hired as a pro scout and goaltending consultant for the New York Islanders in 1996. He was later promoted to their goaltending coach the following year in 1997, he would retain this position and his scouting position until 2001.

== Later life and death ==
Gilbert later resided in Quebec City where he was born and raised. He was married to his wife Diane. The two of them have had one son named Terry and a daughter Jennifer. Additionally he served as a grandfather to his 3 grandchildren.

During his playing days he was the part-owner of a Quebec City nightclub.

For many years he worked for the Canadian Hockey Enterprises an organizations that helped set up hockey tournaments for youth and adults. Gilbert was also a golfer and ran a yearly celebrity golf tournament for charity in Winchendon, Massachusetts.

He died on August 6, 2023, at the age of 74.

== Career statistics ==
=== Regular season and playoffs ===
			Regular season									Playoffs
Season	Team	League	GP	W	L	T	MIN	GA	SO	GAA	SV%	GP	W	L	MIN	GA	SO	GAA	SV%
1966–67	Trois-Rivières Reds	QJHL	43	23	18	2	2540	188	1	4.44	—	14	9	5	850	65	0	4.59	—
1966–67	Thetford Mines Canadiens	M-Cup	—	—	—	—	—	—	—	—	—	5	3	1	276	18	0	3.91	—
1967–68	Trois-Rivières Reds	QJHL	—	—	—	—	—	—	—	—	—	—	—	—	—	—	—	—	—
1968–69	London Knights	OHA-Jr.	37	—	—	—	2200	167	1	4.55	—	—	—	—	—	—	—	—	—
1969–70	Iowa Stars	CHL	39	17	16	5	2340	127	2	3.26	—	4	2	2	245	14	0	3.43	—
1969–70	Minnesota North Stars	NHL	1	0	1	0	60	6	0	6.00	.846	—	—	—	—	—	—	—	—
1970–71	Minnesota North Stars	NHL	17	5	9	2	931	59	0	3.80	.889	—	—	—	—	—	—	—	—
1971–72	Minnesota North Stars	NHL	4	1	2	1	218	11	0	3.03	.891	—	—	—	—	—	—	—	—
1971–72	Cleveland Barons	AHL	41	20	15	5	2319	140	2	3.62	—	4	1	2	187	18	0	5.78	—
1972–73	Minnesota North Stars	NHL	22	10	10	2	1320	67	2	3.05	.904	1	0	1	60	4	0	4.00	.900
1973–74	Boston Bruins	NHL	54	34	12	8	3210	158	6	2.95	.900	16	10	6	977	43	1	2.64	.912
1974–75	Boston Bruins	NHL	53	23	17	11	3029	158	3	3.13	.893	3	1	2	188	12	0	3.83	.859
1975–76	Boston Bruins	NHL	55	33	8	10	3123	151	3	2.90	.887	6	3	3	360	19	2	3.17	.868
1976–77	Boston Bruins	NHL	34	18	13	3	2040	97	1	2.85	.884	1	0	1	20	3	0	9.00	.571
1977–78	Boston Bruins	NHL	25	15	6	2	1326	56	2	2.53	.885	—	—	—	—	—	—	—	—
1978–79	Boston Bruins	NHL	23	12	8	2	1254	74	0	3.54	.869	5	3	2	314	16	0	3.06	.901
1979–80	Boston Bruins	NHL	33	20	9	3	1933	88	1	2.73	.890	—	—	—	—	—	—	—	—
1980–81	Detroit Red Wings	NHL	48	11	24	9	2618	175	0	4.01	.866	—	—	—	—	—	—	—	—
1981–82	Detroit Red Wings	NHL	27	6	10	6	1478	105	0	4.26	.849	—	—	—	—	—	—	—	—
1982–83	Detroit Red Wings	NHL	20	4	14	1	1137	85	0	4.49	.850	—	—	—	—	—	—	—	—
1982–83	Adirondack Red Wings	AHL	4	3	0	0	198	11	0	3.33	.890	—	—	—	—	—	—	—	—
NHL totals			416	192	143	60	23677	1290	18	3.27	.883	32	17	15	1919	97	3	3.03	.895

"Gilbert's stats". The Goaltender Home Page.

== Awards ==
- WTCN-TV Trophy (awarded to Minnesota North Stars' player selected by his teammates as most proficient first-year NHL player), 1972-73.
- Played in the 1974 NHL All-Star Game
- 1979–80 – Runner-up for the NHL's Vezina Trophy
- Named one of the 100 best Bruins players of all time.
