= Ray Schultz =

Canadian ice hockey player (born 1976)

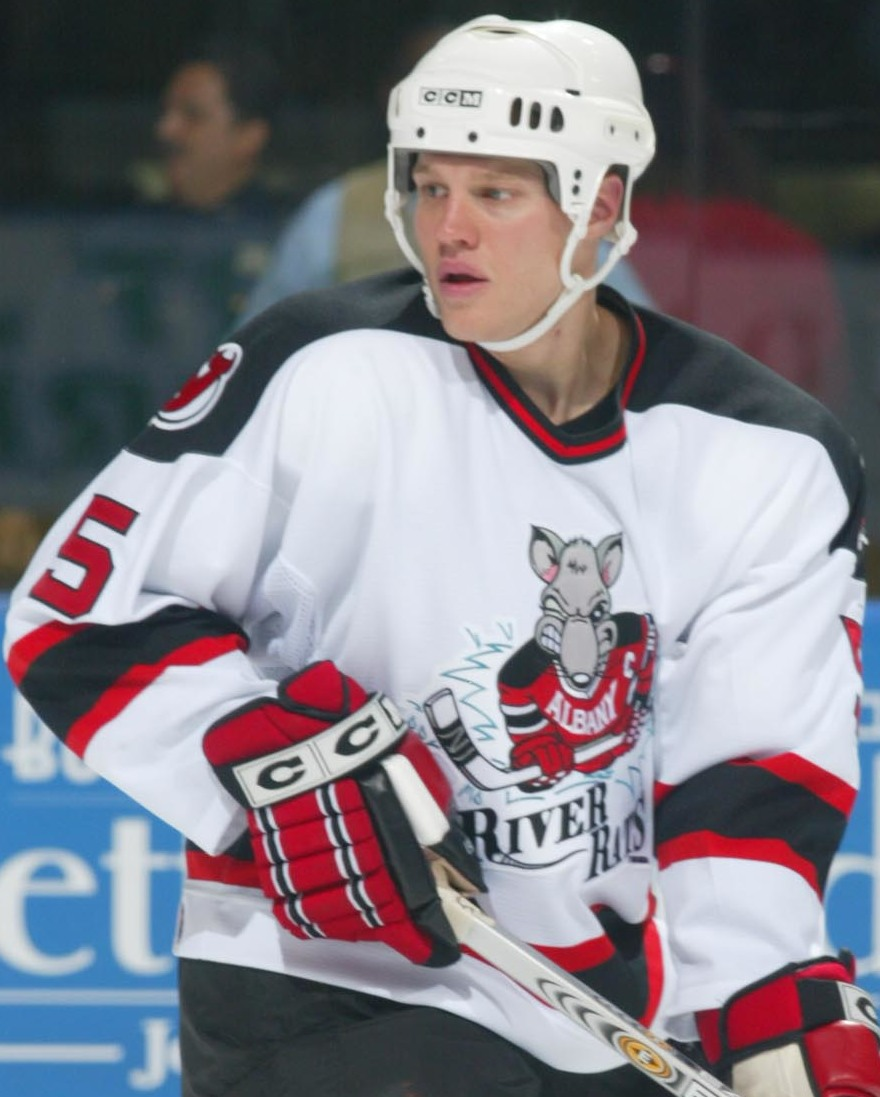
- Schultz with the Albany River Rats in 2004
- Born: November 14, 1976 (age 49) Red Deer, Alberta, Canada
- Height: 6 ft 2 in (188 cm)
- Weight: 216 lb (98 kg; 15 st 6 lb)
- Position: Defense
- Shot: Left
- Played for: New York Islanders
- NHL draft: 184th overall, 1995; Ottawa Senators
- Playing career: 1997–2006

Ray Schultz (born November 14, 1976) is a Canadian former professional ice hockey defenceman who played 45 games for the New York Islanders in the National Hockey League; recording four assists and 155 penalty minutes. Schultz was an eighth-round draft pick of the Ottawa Senators at the 1995 NHL entry draft.

== Playing career ==
After a successful junior career in the Western Hockey League and un-signed from the Senators, Schultz agreed to an entry-level deal with the New York Islanders as a free agent on June 9, 1997. Schultz spent the next six seasons within the Islanders organization as a depth defenceman, before leaving as a free agent in signing a contract with the Nashville Predators on July 17, 2003. In the following 2003–04 season, with the Predators American Hockey League affiliate, the Milwaukee Admirals, Schultz's veteran experience was looked upon in helping the Admirals claim the Calder Cup.

On July 6, 2004, having left the Predators as a free agent, Schultz signed a two-year contract with the New Jersey Devils. During his final year under contract in the 2005–06 season, Schultz was included in a trade by the Devils, along with Pascal Rheaume and Steven Spencer to the Phoenix Coyotes in exchange for Brad Ference on November 25, 2005. He featured in just 16 games with the Coyotes affiliate, the San Antonio Rampage, before he was loaned to fellow AHL club, the Springfield Falcons. This concluded his professional career.

== Career statistics ==
			Regular season					Playoffs
Season	Team	League	GP	G	A	Pts	PIM	GP	G	A	Pts	PIM
1993–94	Edmonton Athletic Club AAA	AMHL	31	3	24	27	94	—	—	—	—	—
1993–94	Tri–City Americans	WHL	3	0	0	0	11	—	—	—	—	—
1994–95	Tri–City Americans	WHL	63	1	8	9	209	11	0	0	0	16
1995–96	Calgary Hitmen	WHL	66	3	17	20	282	—	—	—	—	—
1996–97	Calgary Hitmen	WHL	32	3	17	20	141	—	—	—	—	—
1996–97	Kelowna Rockets	WHL	23	3	11	14	63	6	0	2	2	12
1997–98	Kentucky Thoroughblades	AHL	51	2	4	6	179	1	0	0	0	25
1997–98	New York Islanders	NHL	13	0	1	1	45	—	—	—	—	—
1998–99	Lowell Lock Monsters	AHL	54	0	3	3	184	1	0	0	0	4
1998–99	New York Islanders	NHL	4	0	0	0	7	—	—	—	—	—
1999–2000	Kansas City Blades	IHL	65	5	5	10	208	—	—	—	—	—
1999–2000	New York Islanders	NHL	9	0	1	1	30	—	—	—	—	—
2000–01	Lowell Lock Monsters	AHL	13	0	1	1	33	—	—	—	—	—
2000–01	Cleveland Lumberjacks	IHL	44	3	5	8	127	3	1	0	1	16
2000–01	New York Islanders	NHL	13	0	2	2	40	—	—	—	—	—
2001–02	Bridgeport Sound Tigers	AHL	69	0	15	15	205	19	1	3	4	18
2001–02	New York Islanders	NHL	2	0	0	0	5	2	0	0	0	2
2002–03	Bridgeport Sound Tigers	AHL	51	2	8	10	105	9	1	0	1	14
2002–03	New York Islanders	NHL	4	0	0	0	28	—	—	—	—	—
2003–04	Milwaukee Admirals	AHL	73	2	10	12	153	22	1	2	3	31
2004–05	Albany Devils	AHL	77	5	14	19	227	—	—	—	—	—
2005–06	Albany Devils	AHL	18	0	5	5	22	—	—	—	—	—
2005–06	San Antonio Rampage	AHL	16	1	1	2	28	—	—	—	—	—
2005–06	Springfield Falcons	AHL	33	1	3	4	42	—	—	—	—	—
2007–08	Bentley Generals	ChHL	3	0	0	0	0	11	2	0	2	25
2008–09	Bentley Generals	ChHL	3	1	1	2	2	5	0	0	0	2
AHL totals			455	13	64	77	1178	52	3	5	8	92
NHL totals			45	0	4	4	155	2	0	0	0	2

== Awards and honours ==
Award	Year
AHL
Calder Cup (Milwaukee Admirals)	2004
