= 1973–74 NHL season =

National Hockey League season

- League: National Hockey League
- Sport: Ice hockey
- Duration: October 10, 1973 – May 19, 1974
- Games: 78
- Teams: 16
- TV partner(s): CBC, CTV, SRC (Canada); NBC (United States)

Draft
- Top draft pick: Denis Potvin
- Picked by: New York Islanders

Regular season
- Season champions: Boston Bruins
- Season MVP: Phil Esposito (Bruins)
- Top scorer: Phil Esposito (Bruins)

Playoffs
- Playoffs MVP: Bernie Parent (Flyers)

Stanley Cup
- Champions: Philadelphia Flyers
- Runners-up: Boston Bruins

NHL seasons
- 1972–73 1974–75

The 1973–74 NHL season was the 57th season of the National Hockey League. The Philadelphia Flyers won the Stanley Cup championship, the team's first. The team was the first of the post-1967 teams to win the Cup.

== League business ==
With owner Charles O. Finley unable to find a buyer, the league took over operation of the troubled California Golden Seals in February 1974. Fred Glover then resigned as general manager-coach. Garry Young, who had served as general manager from October 1971 to November 1972, agreed to return. Marshall Johnston, a defenseman for the Golden Seals, retired and took over as coach.

The 1973 NHL amateur draft was held on May 15 at the Mount Royal Hotel in Montreal, Quebec. Denis Potvin was selected first overall by the New York Islanders.

== Regular season ==
The Philadelphia Flyers, who developed the nickname "Broad Street Bullies" because of their physical style of play, dethroned the Chicago Black Hawks as the West Division champions behind the dominant play of Bobby Clarke and Bernie Parent.

The New York Rangers were floundering under new coach Larry Popein and were in danger of missing the playoffs, and Emile Francis took over the coaching reins. The Rangers then improved enough to get into the playoffs.

Tragedy hit the NHL in the early morning hours of February 21 when 44 year-old Buffalo Sabres defenseman Tim Horton was killed in an automobile accident. He had been returning to Buffalo from Toronto at the time.

In the East Division, the Boston Bruins regained the top spot in the East and the league, behind an ongoing offensive juggernaut that saw Bruins' players finish 1–2–3–4 in NHL scoring (Phil Esposito, Bobby Orr, Ken Hodge, and Wayne Cashman) for the second and most recent time in league history.

=== Final standings ===
East Division
		GP	W	L	T	GF	GA	DIFF	Pts
1	Boston Bruins	78	52	17	9	349	221	+128	113
2	Montreal Canadiens	78	45	24	9	293	240	+53	99
3	New York Rangers	78	40	24	14	300	251	+49	94
4	Toronto Maple Leafs	78	35	27	16	274	230	+44	86
5	Buffalo Sabres	78	32	34	12	242	250	−8	76
6	Detroit Red Wings	78	29	39	10	255	319	−64	68
7	Vancouver Canucks	78	24	43	11	224	296	−72	59
8	New York Islanders	78	19	41	18	182	247	−65	56

West Division
		GP	W	L	T	GF	GA	DIFF	Pts
1	Philadelphia Flyers	78	50	16	12	273	164	+109	112
2	Chicago Black Hawks	78	41	14	23	272	164	+108	105
3	Los Angeles Kings	78	33	33	12	233	231	+2	78
4	Atlanta Flames	78	30	34	14	214	238	−24	74
5	Pittsburgh Penguins	78	28	41	9	242	273	−31	65
6	St. Louis Blues	78	26	40	12	206	248	−42	64
7	Minnesota North Stars	78	23	38	17	235	275	−40	63
8	California Golden Seals	78	13	55	10	195	342	−147	36

== Playoffs ==
The playoffs began on April 9. The New York Rangers defeated the defending Stanley Cup champions in the first round for the third straight year, this time the Montreal Canadiens. For the first time since the inter-divisional semifinals were introduced in the 1971 playoffs, a 1967 expansion team eliminated an Original Six opponent when the Philadelphia Flyers defeated the Rangers. The Flyers not only made their first Stanley Cup Finals appearance, but by defeating the Boston Bruins in six games, Philadelphia became the first 1967 expansion team to win the Stanley Cup and the first non Original Six team to win it since the Montreal Maroons in 1935.

=== Playoff bracket ===
The top four teams in each division qualified for the playoffs. In each round, teams competed in a best-of-seven series (scores in the bracket indicate the number of games won in each best-of-seven series).

In the quarterfinals, the fourth seeded team in each division played against the division winner from their division. The other series matched the second and third place teams from the divisions. The semifinals were then inter-divisional matchups, with winner of each #1 vs. #4 series playing the winner of the #2 vs. #3 series in the other division. The winners of the semifinals then advanced to the Stanley Cup Finals.

Quarterfinals
E1	Boston	4
E4	Toronto	0
W2	Chicago	4
W3	Los Angeles	1
W1	Philadelphia	4
W4	Atlanta	0
E2	Montreal	2
E3	NY Rangers	4

Semifinals
E1	Boston	4
W2	Chicago	2
W1	Philadelphia	4
E3	NY Rangers	3

Stanley Cup Finals
E1	Boston	2
W1	Philadelphia	4

=== Quarterfinals ===
==== (E1) Boston Bruins vs. (E4) Toronto Maple Leafs ====
The Boston Bruins finished first in the league with 113 points. The Toronto Maple Leafs finished fourth in the East Division with 86 points. This was the 13th playoff meeting between these two teams. Toronto lead 8–4 in previous meetings. Boston won their most recent meeting in five games in the 1972 Stanley Cup Quarterfinals. Boston won four of the six games in this year's regular season series.

April 10	Toronto Maple Leafs	0–1	Boston Bruins	Boston Garden	Recap
No scoring		First period	No scoring
No scoring		Second period	04:22 – Gregg Sheppard (1)
No scoring		Third period	No scoring
Doug Favell 32 saves / 33 shots		Goalie stats	Gilles Gilbert 35 saves / 35 shots

April 11	Toronto Maple Leafs	3–6	Boston Bruins	Boston Garden	Recap
Ron Ellis (1) – 14:24; Dave Keon (1) – 19:06		First period	08:56 – Ken Hodge (1); 15:46 – Bobby Schmautz (1)
Darryl Sittler (1) – pp – 15:01		Second period	03:31 – Johnny Bucyk (1); 13:13 – Wayne Cashman (1)
No scoring		Third period	07:34 – pp – Phil Esposito (1); 19:14 – sh – en – Gregg Sheppard (2)
Doug Favell 31 saves / 36 shots		Goalie stats	Gilles Gilbert 36 saves / 39 shots

April 13	Boston Bruins	6–3	Toronto Maple Leafs	Maple Leaf Gardens	Recap
No scoring		First period	08:54 – Bob Neely (1)
Andre Savard (1) – 01:59; Gregg Sheppard (3) – 05:44; Gregg Sheppard (4) – 16:46; Johnny Bucyk (2) – 17:00		Second period	19:30 – Darryl Sittler (2)
Wayne Cashman (2) – 01:22; Bobby Schmautz (2) – 11:42		Third period	02:20 – Eddie Shack (1)
Gilles Gilbert 45 saves / 48 shots		Goalie stats	Eddie Johnston 24 saves / 30 shots

April 14	Boston Bruins	4–3	OT	Toronto Maple Leafs	Maple Leaf Gardens	Recap
Terry O'Reilly (1) – 08:53		First period		14:56 – Ron Ellis (2)
Ken Hodge (2) – 06:51		Second period		08:58 – Norm Ullman (1)
Bobby Orr (1) – pp – 17:34		Third period		18:43 – Inge Hammarstrom (1)
Ken Hodge (3) – 01:27		First overtime period		No scoring
Gilles Gilbert 30 saves / 33 shots		Goalie stats		Doug Favell 41 saves / 45 shots

Boston won series 4–0

==== (E2) Montreal Canadiens vs. (E3) New York Rangers ====
The Montreal Canadiens finished second in the East Division with 99 points. The New York Rangers finished third with 94 points. This was the 11th playoff meeting between these two teams with the teams splitting the ten previous series. They last met in the 1972 Stanley Cup Quarterfinals which New York won in six games. Montreal won four of the six games in this year's regular season series.

April 10	New York Rangers	4–1	Montreal Canadiens	Montreal Forum	Recap
Steve Vickers (1) -pp – 10:48; Bruce MacGregor (1) – 11:07		First period	No scoring
Dale Rolfe (1) – 02:43		Second period	08:59 – Steve Shutt (1)
Brad Park (1) – 18:11		Third period	No scoring
Eddie Giacomin 23 saves / 24 shots		Goalie stats	Michel Larocque 27 saves / 31 shots

April 11	New York Rangers	1–4	Montreal Canadiens	Montreal Forum	Recap
Bruce MacGregor (2) – 12:51		First period	No scoring
No scoring		Second period	05:03 – Steve Shutt (2); 18:11 – Yvan Cournoyer (1)
No scoring		Third period	11:53 – Yvan Cournoyer (2); 14:51 – Yvan Cournoyer (3)
Eddie Giacomin 27 saves / 31 shots		Goalie stats	Michel Larocque 18 saves / 19 shots

April 13	Montreal Canadiens	4–2	New York Rangers	Madison Square Garden	Recap
Peter Mahovlich (1) – 03:38; Steve Shutt (3) – pp – 15:03; Yvan Cournoyer (4) – 18:47		First period	No scoring
Yvan Cournoyer (5) – 00:49		Second period	No scoring
No scoring		Third period	08:06 – pp – Pete Stemkowski (1); 11:48 – Jean Ratelle (1)
Michel Larocque 32 saves / 34 shots		Goalie stats	Eddie Giacomin 28 saves / 32 shots

April 14	Montreal Canadiens	4–6	New York Rangers	Madison Square Garden	Recap
Steve Shutt (4) – 00:46; Peter Mahovlich (2) – pp – 18:37		First period	09:35 – Ron Harris (1)
Frank Mahovlich (1) – 02:56		Second period	04:46 – pp – Rod Gilbert (1); 14:00 – Ted Irvine (1)
Serge Savard (1) – 13:57		Third period	01:18 – Ted Irvine (2); 15:06 – Bruce MacGregor (3); 19:18 – en – Pete Stemkowski (2)
Michel Larocque 32 saves / 37 shots		Goalie stats	Eddie Giacomin 24 saves / 28 shots

April 16	New York Rangers	3–2	OT	Montreal Canadiens	Montreal Forum	Recap
Bruce MacGregor (4) – 12:43		First period		00:49 – Henri Richard (1)
No scoring		Second period		No scoring
Bruce MacGregor (5) – 19:44		Third period		05:24 – Murray Wilson (1)
Ron Harris (2) – 04:07		First overtime period		No scoring
Eddie Giacomin 25 saves / 27 shots		Goalie stats		Michel Larocque 39 saves / 42 shots

April 18	Montreal Canadiens	2–5	New York Rangers	Madison Square Garden	Recap
Henri Richard (2) – 09:15		First period	No scoring
Steve Shutt (5) – 02:07		Second period	08:41 – Bruce MacGregor (6); 09:27 – Bill Fairbairn (1)
No scoring		Third period	11:04 – Jean Ratelle (2); 19:06 – en – Pete Stemkowski (3); 19:24 – en – Pete Stemkowski (4)
Michel Larocque 22 saves / 25 shots		Goalie stats	Eddie Giacomin 22 saves / 24 shots

New York won series 4–2

==== (W1) Philadelphia Flyers vs. (W4) Atlanta Flames ====
The Philadelphia Flyers finished first in the West Division and second in the league with 112 points. The Atlanta Flames finished fourth with 74 points, the lowest points earned by any playoff team in 1974. The Atlanta Flames made their first playoff appearance in their second season after entering the league in the previous year. This was the first playoff series meeting between these two teams. The teams split this year's six-game regular season series.

April 9	Atlanta Flames	1–4	Philadelphia Flyers	The Spectrum	Recap
No scoring		First period	19:56 – sh – Gary Dornhoefer (1)
No scoring		Second period	13:36 – pp – Tom Bladon (1)
Bob Murray (1) – 09:29		Third period	08:59 – Orest Kindrachuk (1); 12:09 – Orest Kindrachuk (2)
Phil Myre 37 saves / 41 shots		Goalie stats	Bernie Parent 31 saves / 32 shots

April 11	Atlanta Flames	1–5	Philadelphia Flyers	The Spectrum	Recap
No scoring		First period	06:01 – Terry Crisp (1)
No scoring		Second period	03:26 – Rick MacLeish (1); 06:20 – Rick MacLeish (2); 18:26 – Rich MacLeish (3)
Rey Comeau (1) – 01:31		Third period	11:52 – pp – Jimmy Watson (1)
Phil Myre 28 saves / 33 shots		Goalie stats	Bernie Parent 20 saves / 21 shots

April 12	Philadelphia Flyers	4–1	Atlanta Flames	The Omni	Recap
Don Saleski (1) – 02:51; Bobby Clarke (1) – pp – 05:02		First period	No scoring
Rick MacLeish (4) – 13:47		Second period	08:47 – Larry Romanchych (1)
Bill Barber (1) – 02:20		Third period	No scoring
Bernie Parent 27 saves / 28 shots		Goalie stats	Dan Bouchard 22 saves / 26 shots

April 14	Philadelphia Flyers	4–3	OT	Atlanta Flames	The Omni	Recap
No scoring		First period		03:28 – Larry Romanchych (2)
Andre Dupont (1) – 16:48		Second period		05:33 – pp – Jean Lemieux (1); 16:19 – Rey Comeau (2)
Gary Dornhoefer (2) – pp – 01:16; Tom Bladon (2) – pp – 06:34		Third period		No scoring
Dave Schultz (1) – 05:40		First overtime period		No scoring
Bernie Parent 23 saves / 26 shots		Goalie stats		Phil Myre 35 saves / 39 shots

Philadelphia won series 4–0

==== (W2) Chicago Black Hawks vs. (W3) Los Angeles Kings ====
The Chicago Black Hawks finished second in the West Division with 105 points. The Los Angeles Kings finished third in the West Division with 78 points. This was the first playoff series meeting between these two teams. Chicago won this year's six-game regular season series earning eight of twelve points.

April 10	Los Angeles Kings	1–3	Chicago Blackhawks	Chicago Stadium	Recap
Gene Carr (1) – pp – 09:08		First period	No scoring
No scoring		Second period	11:13 – Darcy Rota (1); 16:51 – Dennis Hull (1)
No scoring		Third period	19:12 – en – Stan Mikita (1)
Rogie Vachon 29 saves / 31 shots		Goalie stats	Tony Esposito 27 saves / 28 shots

April 11	Los Angeles Kings	1–4	Chicago Blackhawks	Chicago Stadium	Recap
No scoring		First period	12:21 – pp – Dick Redmond (1)
Bob Nevin (1) – 04:03		Second period	18:13 – Stan Mikita (2)
No scoring		Third period	03:07 – Dennis Hull (2); 19:27 – en – Jim Pappin (1)
Rogie Vachon 24 saves / 27 shots		Goalie stats	Tony Esposito 34 saves / 35 shots

April 13	Chicago Blackhawks	1–0	Los Angeles Kings	The Forum	Recap
Germain Gagnon (1) – 00:40		First period	No scoring
No scoring		Second period	No scoring
No scoring		Third period	No scoring
Tony Esposito 32 saves / 32 shots		Goalie stats	Rogie Vachon 9 saves / 10 shots

April 14	Chicago Blackhawks	1–5	Los Angeles Kings	The Forum	Recap
Dennis Hull (3) – 03:07		First period	No scoring
No scoring		Second period	04:04 – Gene Carr (2)
No scoring		Third period	03:24 – Juha Widing (1); 06:29 – Tom Williams (1); 10:27 – Tom Williams (2); 12:47 – pp – Tom Williams (3)
Mike Veisor 28 saves / 33 shots		Goalie stats	Gary Edwards 22 saves / 23 shots

April 16	Los Angeles Kings	0–1	Chicago Blackhawks	Chicago Stadium	Recap
No scoring		First period	No scoring
No scoring		Second period	No scoring
No scoring		Third period	15:23 – Jim Pappin (2)
Rogie Vachon 27 saves / 28 shots		Goalie stats	Tony Esposito 18 saves / 18 shots

Chicago won series 4–1

=== Semifinals ===
==== (E1) Boston Bruins vs. (W2) Chicago Black Hawks ====
This was the fourth playoff meeting between these two teams with Boston winning all three previous series. Boston won their most recent meeting in a four-game sweep in the 1970 Stanley Cup Semifinals. Chicago won this year's five-game regular season series earning seven of ten points.

April 18	Chicago Blackhawks	4–2	Boston Bruins	Boston Garden	Recap
No scoring		First period	06:40 – pp – Phil Esposito (2)
Stan Mikita (3) – 03:48; Darcy Rota (2) – 08:12		Second period	No scoring
John Marks (1) – 16:56; Dennis Hull (4) – en – 19:39		Third period	09:08 – Darryl Edestrand (1)
Tony Esposito 46 saves / 48 shots		Goalie stats	Gilles Gilbert 20 saves / 23 shots

April 21	Chicago Blackhawks	6–8	Boston Bruins	Boston Garden	Recap
Darcy Rota (3) – 09:04; Dale Tallon (1) – pp – 19:15		First period	06:44 – pp – Johnny Bucyk (3); 11:56 – pp – Johnny Bucyk (4)
Dennis Hull (5) – 04:40; Germain Gagnon (2) – pp – 12:38		Second period	01:28 – Terry O'Reilly (2); 17:34 – pp – Johnny Bucyk (5)
Dennis Hull (6) – pp – 05:12; John Marks (2) – 13:52		Third period	02:59 – Phil Esposito (3); 07:56 – Bobby Schmautz (3); 08:40 – Don Marcotte (1); 11:53 – Gregg Sheppard (5)
Tony Esposito 27 saves / 35 shots		Goalie stats	Gilles Gilbert 23 saves / 29 shots

April 23	Boston Bruins	3–4	OT	Chicago Blackhawks	Chicago Stadium	Recap
Carol Vadnais (1) – pp – 13:18		First period		No scoring
Gregg Sheppard (6) – 16:39		Second period		03:09 – pp – Bill White (1)
Ken Hodge (4) – pp – 04:53		Third period		11:38 – pp – Stan Mikita (4); 19:18 – Stan Mikita (5)
No scoring		First overtime period		03:48 – Jim Pappin (3)
Gilles Gilbert 36 saves / 40 shots		Goalie stats		Tony Esposito 33 saves / 36 shots

April 25	Boston Bruins	5–2	Chicago Blackhawks	Chicago Stadium	Recap
Gregg Sheppard (7) – 12:07; Ken Hodge (5) – 19:51		First period	10:50 – Pit Martin (1)
Phil Esposito (4) – pp – 10:29; Andre Savard (2) – 14:31		Second period	15:23 – Keith Magnuson (1)
Wayne Cashman (3) – en – 19:31		Third period	No scoring
Gilles Gilbert 22 saves / 24 shots		Goalie stats	Tony Esposito 26 saves / 30 shots

April 28	Chicago Blackhawks	2–6	Boston Bruins	Boston Garden	Recap
No scoring		First period	15:13 – Johnny Bucyk (6)
Cliff Koroll (1) – pp – 06:02		Second period	00:47 – Johnny Bucyk (7); 02:09 – Phil Esposito (5); 03:35 – Dallas Smith (1); 06:50 – Phil Esposito (6); 17:25 – Gregg Sheppard (8)
Pit Martin (2) – pp – 02:25		Third period	No scoring
Tony Esposito 17 saves / 23 shots Mike Veisor 12 saves / 12 shots		Goalie stats	Gilles Gilbert 19 saves / 21 shots

April 30	Boston Bruins	4–2	Chicago Blackhawks	Chicago Stadium	Recap
No scoring		First period	07:16 – Cliff Koroll (2)
Don Marcotte (2) – 05:59; Don Marcotte (3) – 10:05		Second period	No scoring
Gregg Sheppard (9) – 18:11; Phil Esposito (7) – 18:44		Third period	04:18 – pp – Len Frig (1)
Gilles Gilbert 25 saves / 27 shots		Goalie stats	Tony Esposito 27 saves / 30 shots

Boston won series 4–2

==== (W1) Philadelphia Flyers vs. (E3) New York Rangers ====
This was the first playoff meeting between these two teams. New York won this year's five-game regular season series earning six of ten points.

April 20	New York Rangers	0–4	Philadelphia Flyers	The Spectrum	Recap
No scoring		First period	19:03 – pp – Rick MacLeish (5)
No scoring		Second period	04:33 – Ross Lonsberry (1); 05:25 – Bill Barber (2)
No scoring		Third period	18:07 – Rick MacLeish (6)
Eddie Giacomin 19 saves / 23 shots		Goalie stats	Bernie Parent 19 saves / 19 shots

April 23	New York Rangers	2–5	Philadelphia Flyers	The Spectrum	Recap
No scoring		First period	08:13 – pp – Bobby Clarke (2)
Jack Egers (1) – 18:36		Second period	10:37 – Ed Van Impe (1)
Brad Park (2) – pp – 08:10		Third period	07:54 – sh – Ross Lonsberry (2); 16:20 – Rick MacLeish (7); 19:26 – pp – en – Ross Lonsberry (3)
Eddie Giacomin 25 saves / 29 shots		Goalie stats	Bernie Parent 28 saves / 30 shots

April 25	Philadelphia Flyers	3–5	New York Rangers	Madison Square Garden	Recap
Rick MacLeish (8) – pp – 06:57; Andre Dupont (2) – 12:20		First period	14:28 – Bill Fairbairn (2)
Gary Dornhoefer (3) – pp – 11:33		Second period	13:57 – pp – Steve Vickers (2); 18:44 – Vic Hadfield (1)
No scoring		Third period	08:53 – pp – Brad Park (3); 13:14 – Rod Gilbert (2)
Bernie Parent 34 saves / 39 shots		Goalie stats	Eddie Giacomin 12 saves / 15 shots

April 28	Philadelphia Flyers	1–2	OT	New York Rangers	Madison Square Garden	Recap
Joe Watson (1) – 15:32		First period		No scoring
No scoring		Second period		18:13 – pp – Bobby Rousseau (1)
No scoring		Third period		No scoring
No scoring		First overtime period		04:20 – Rod Gilbert (3)
Bernie Parent 35 saves / 37 shots		Goalie stats		Ed Giacomin 19 saves / 20 shots

April 30	New York Rangers	1–4	Philadelphia Flyers	The Spectrum	Recap
Pete Stemkowski (5) – 06:16		First period	No scoring
No scoring		Second period	06:49 – Tom Bladon (3); 17:39 – Rick MacLeish (9)
No scoring		Third period	08:05 – Simon Nolet (1); 19:27 – Rick MacLeish (10)
Eddie Giacomin 24 saves / 27 shots		Goalie stats	Bernie Parent 27 saves / 28 shots

May 2	Philadelphia Flyers	1–4	New York Rangers	Madison Square Garden	Recap
Don Saleski (2) – 05:41		First period	16:59 – Brad Park (4)
No scoring		Second period	No scoring
No scoring		Third period	04:10 – Ron Harris (3); 05:48 – Ted Irvine (3); 19:39 – en – Steve Vickers (3)
Bernie Parent 34 saves / 37 shots		Goalie stats	Eddie Giacomin 24 saves / 25 shots

May 5	New York Rangers	3–4	Philadelphia Flyers	The Spectrum	Recap
Bill Fairbairn (3) – 13:43		First period	14:40 – pp – Rick MacLeish (11)
No scoring		Second period	02:27 – Orest Kindrachuk (3); 11:26 – Gary Dornhoefer (4)
Steve Vickers (4) – 08:49; Pete Stemkowski (6) – 14:43		Third period	09:01 – Gary Dornhoefer (5)
Eddie Giacomin 42 saves / 46 shots		Goalie stats	Bernie Parent 31 saves / 34 shots

Philadelphia won series 4–3

=== Stanley Cup Finals ===
This was the first playoff meeting between these two teams. The Bruins made their thirteenth Finals appearance; winning in their last appearance in 1972 where they defeated the New York Rangers in six games. The Flyers made their first Finals appearance in their seventh season since entering the league in the 1967–68 NHL season. Boston won this year's five-game regular season series earning seven of ten points. Boston was the prohibitive favorite entering the series.

However, the Philadelphia Flyers stunned the Bruins in six games to become the first non-Original Six team to win the Stanley Cup since 1935 and the first expansion team to do so since the league began expanding in 1967.

May 7	Philadelphia Flyers	2–3	Boston Bruins	Boston Garden	Recap
No scoring		First period	12:05 – pp – Wayne Cashman (4); 13:01 – Gregg Sheppard (10)
Orest Kindrachuk (4) – 07:47		Second period	No scoring
Bobby Clarke (3) – 05:32		Third period	19:38 – Bobby Orr (2)
Bernie Parent 28 saves / 31 shots		Goalie stats	Gilles Gilbert 26 saves / 28 shots

May 9	Philadelphia Flyers	3–2	OT	Boston Bruins	Boston Garden	Recap
No scoring		First period		14:24 – Wayne Cashman (5); 17:22 – Phil Esposito (8)
Bobby Clarke (4) – 01:08		Second period		No scoring
Andre Dupont (3) – 19:08		Third period		No scoring
Bobby Clarke (5) – 12:01		First overtime period		No scoring
Bernie Parent 37 saves / 39 shots		Goalie stats		Gilles Gilbert 27 saves / 30 shots

May 12	Boston Bruins	1–4	Philadelphia Flyers	The Spectrum	Recap
Johnny Bucyk (8) – 01:03		First period	10:27 – pp – Tom Bladon (4); 15:43 – Terry Crisp (2)
No scoring		Second period	No scoring
No scoring		Third period	07:53 – Orest Kindrachuk (5); 14:19 – Ross Lonsberry (4)
Gilles Gilbert 23 saves / 27 shots		Goalie stats	Bernie Parent 24 saves / 25 shots

May 14	Boston Bruins	2–4	Philadelphia Flyers	The Spectrum	Recap
Phil Esposito (9) – pp – 07:12; Andre Savard (3) – 11:24		First period	04:40 – pp – Rick MacLeish (12); 05:30 – Dave Schultz (2)
No scoring		Second period	No scoring
No scoring		Third period	14:25 – Bill Barber (3); 16:40 – Andre Dupont (4)
Gilles Gilbert 27 saves / 31 shots		Goalie stats	Bernie Parent 28 saves / 30 shots

May 16	Philadelphia Flyers	1–5	Boston Bruins	Boston Garden	Recap
No scoring		First period	08:14 – sh – Gregg Sheppard (11)
Bill Clement (1) – 06:04		Second period	12:06 – Bobby Orr (3); 16:55 – Bobby Orr (4)
No scoring		Third period	00:39 – pp – Ken Hodge (6); 18:59 – Don Marcotte (4)
Bernie Parent 33 saves / 38 shots		Goalie stats	Gilles Gilbert 26 saves / 27 shots

May 19	Boston Bruins	0–1	Philadelphia Flyers	The Spectrum	Recap
No scoring		First period	14:48 – pp – Rick MacLeish (13)
No scoring		Second period	No scoring
No scoring		Third period	No scoring
Gilles Gilbert 25 saves / 26 shots		Goalie stats	Bernie Parent 30 saves / 30 shots

Philadelphia won series 4–2

== Awards ==
A new award, the Jack Adams for the best coach, was introduced for this season. The first winner was Fred Shero of the Philadelphia Flyers.

1974 NHL awards
Prince of Wales Trophy: (East Division champion, regular season)	Boston Bruins
Clarence S. Campbell Bowl: (West Division champion, regular season)	Philadelphia Flyers
Art Ross Trophy: (Top scorer, regular season)	Phil Esposito, Boston Bruins
Bill Masterton Memorial Trophy: (Perseverance, sportsmanship, and dedication)	Henri Richard, Montreal Canadiens
Calder Memorial Trophy: (Top first-year player)	Denis Potvin, New York Islanders
Conn Smythe Trophy: (Most valuable player, playoffs)	Bernie Parent, Philadelphia Flyers
Hart Memorial Trophy: (Most valuable player, regular season)	Phil Esposito, Boston Bruins
Jack Adams Award: (Best coach)	Fred Shero, Philadelphia Flyers
James Norris Memorial Trophy: (Best defenceman)	Bobby Orr, Boston Bruins
Lady Byng Memorial Trophy: (Excellence and sportsmanship)	Johnny Bucyk, Boston Bruins
Lester B. Pearson Award: (Outstanding player, regular season)	Phil Esposito, Boston Bruins
Vezina Trophy: (Goaltender(s) of team(s) with best goaltending record)	Tony Esposito, Chicago Black Hawks and Bernie Parent, Philadelphia Flyers

=== All-Star teams ===
First team	Position	Second team
Bernie Parent, Philadelphia Flyers	G	Tony Esposito, Chicago Black Hawks
Bobby Orr, Boston Bruins	D	Bill White, Chicago Black Hawks
Brad Park, New York Rangers	D	Barry Ashbee, Philadelphia Flyers
Phil Esposito, Boston Bruins	C	Bobby Clarke, Philadelphia Flyers
Ken Hodge, Boston Bruins	RW	Mickey Redmond, Detroit Red Wings
Rick Martin, Buffalo Sabres	LW	Wayne Cashman, Boston Bruins

== Player statistics ==
=== Scoring leaders ===
Note: GP = Games played, G = Goals, A = Assists, Pts = Points, PIM = Penalties in minutes

Player	Team	GP	G	A	Pts	PIM
Phil Esposito	Boston Bruins	78	68	77	145	58
Bobby Orr	Boston Bruins	74	32	90	122	82
Ken Hodge	Boston Bruins	76	50	55	105	43
Wayne Cashman	Boston Bruins	78	30	59	89	111
Bobby Clarke	Philadelphia Flyers	77	35	52	87	113
Rick Martin	Buffalo Sabres	78	52	34	86	38
Syl Apps, Jr	Pittsburgh Penguins	75	24	61	85	37
Darryl Sittler	Toronto Maple Leafs	78	38	46	84	55
Lowell MacDonald	Pittsburgh Penguins	78	43	39	82	14
Brad Park	New York Rangers	78	25	57	82	148
Dennis Hextall	Minnesota North Stars	78	20	62	82	138

Source: NHL.

=== Leading goaltenders ===
Note: GP = Games played; Min = Minutes played; GA = Goals against; GAA = Goals against average; W = Wins; L = Losses; T = Ties; SO = Shutouts

Player	Team	GP	MIN	GA	GAA	W	L	T	SO
Bernie Parent	Philadelphia Flyers	73	4314	136	1.89	47	13	12	12
Tony Esposito	Chicago Black Hawks	70	4143	141	2.04	34	14	21	10
Ross Brooks	Boston Bruins	21	1170	46	2.36	16	3	0	3
Doug Favell	Toronto Maple Leafs	32	1752	79	2.71	14	7	9	0
Wayne Thomas	Montreal Canadiens	42	2410	111	2.76	23	12	5	1
Dan Bouchard	Atlanta Flames	46	2660	123	2.77	19	18	8	5
Rogie Vachon	L.A. Kings	65	3751	175	2.80	28	26	10	5
Michel Larocque	Montreal Canadiens	27	1431	69	2.89	15	8	2	0
Dunc Wilson	Toronto Maple Leafs	24	1412	68	2.89	9	11	3	1
Gilles Gilbert	Boston Bruins	54	3210	158	2.95	34	12	8	6

=== Other statistics ===
- Plus-minus leader: Bobby Orr, Boston Bruins

== Coaches ==
=== East ===
- Boston Bruins: Bep Guidolin
- Buffalo Sabres: Joe Crozier
- Detroit Red Wings: Ted Garvin and Alex Delvecchio
- Montreal Canadiens: Scotty Bowman
- New York Islanders: Al Arbour
- New York Rangers: Larry Popein and Emile Francis
- Toronto Maple Leafs: Red Kelly
- Vancouver Canucks: Phil Maloney

=== West ===
- Atlanta Flames: Bernie Geoffrion
- California Golden Seals: Fred Glover and Marshall Johnston
- Chicago Black Hawks: Billy Reay
- Los Angeles Kings: Bob Pulford
- Minnesota North Stars: Jack Gordon and Parker MacDonald
- Philadelphia Flyers: Fred Shero
- Pittsburgh Penguins: Ken Schinkel and Marc Boileau
- St. Louis Blues: Jean-Guy Talbot and Lou Angotti

== Debuts ==
The following is a list of players of note who played their first NHL game in 1973–74 (listed with their first team, asterisk(*) marks debut in playoffs):

- Eric Vail, Atlanta Flames
- Tom Lysiak, Atlanta Flames
- Peter McNab, Buffalo Sabres
- Darcy Rota, Chicago Black Hawks
- Blake Dunlop, Minnesota North Stars
- Bob Gainey, Montreal Canadiens
- Michel Larocque, Montreal Canadiens
- Denis Potvin, New York Islanders
- Chico Resch, New York Islanders
- Dave Lewis, New York Islanders
- Al MacAdam, Philadelphia Flyers
- Blaine Stoughton, Pittsburgh Penguins
- John Davidson, St. Louis Blues
- Inge Hammarstrom, Toronto Maple Leafs
- Borje Salming, Toronto Maple Leafs
- Lanny McDonald, Toronto Maple Leafs
- Bob Dailey, Vancouver Canucks
- Dennis Ververgaert, Vancouver Canucks

== Last games ==
The following is a list of players of note that played their last game in the NHL in 1973–74 (listed with their last team):

- Tim Horton, Buffalo Sabres
- Alex Delvecchio, Detroit Red Wings
- Dean Prentice, Minnesota North Stars
- Gump Worsley, Minnesota North Stars
- Frank Mahovlich, Montreal Canadiens
- Jacques Laperriere, Montreal Canadiens
- Barry Ashbee, Philadelphia Flyers
- Orland Kurtenbach, Vancouver Canucks

NOTE: Frank Mahovlich would finish his major professional career in the World Hockey Association.

== Broadcasting ==
Hockey Night in Canada on CBC Television televised Saturday night regular season games and Stanley Cup playoff games. HNIC also produced Wednesday night regular season game telecasts for CTV.

This was the second season under the U.S. rights agreement with NBC, airing weekend afternoon regular season games and playoff games.

== See also ==
- List of Stanley Cup champions
- 1973 NHL amateur draft
- 1973–74 NHL transactions
- 27th National Hockey League All-Star Game
- National Hockey League All-Star Game
- List of WHA seasons
- Lester Patrick Trophy
- 1973 in sports
- 1974 in sports
