= Bobby Schmautz =

Canadian ice hockey player (1945–2021)

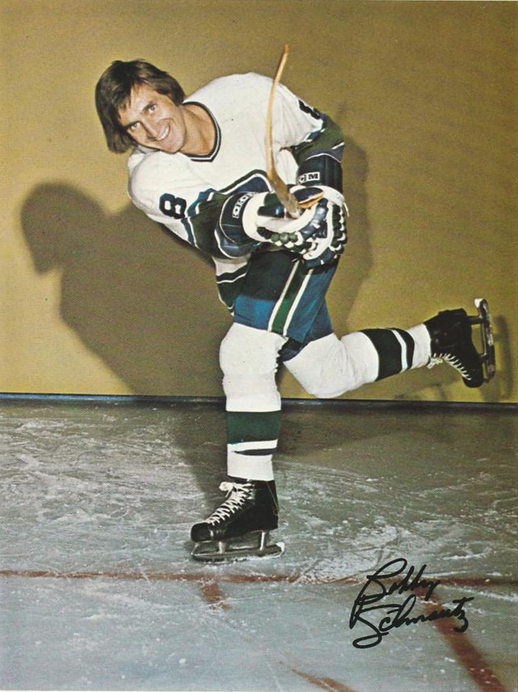
- Schmautz in 1973
- Born: March 28, 1945 Saskatoon, Saskatchewan, Canada
- Died: March 28, 2021 (aged 76) Peoria, Arizona, United States
- Height: 5 ft 9 in (175 cm)
- Weight: 155 lb (70 kg; 11 st 1 lb)
- Position: Right wing
- Shot: Right
- Played for: Chicago Black Hawks; Vancouver Canucks; Boston Bruins; Edmonton Oilers; Colorado Rockies
- Playing career: 1967–1981

Robert James Schmautz (March 28, 1945 – March 28, 2021) was a Canadian professional ice hockey forward who played 13 seasons in the National Hockey League (NHL). He played for the Chicago Black Hawks, Vancouver Canucks, Boston Bruins, Edmonton Oilers, and Colorado Rockies from 1967 to 1981. He featured in three Stanley Cup Finals with the Bruins.

== Early life ==
Schmautz was born in Saskatoon, Saskatchewan, on March 28, 1945. He played junior hockey in his hometown with the junior Quakers and the Blades, before signing his first professional contract in 1964 with the Los Angeles Blades of the Western Hockey League (WHL).

== Career ==
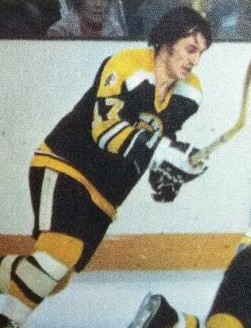
Schmautz in 1975 for Boston Bruins

Schmautz played with the Blades until 1967 when he was signed by the Chicago Black Hawks of the National Hockey League (NHL). His NHL rights were transferred to the St. Louis Blues in the 1969 intraleague draft; he ultimately never played for the Blues, instead being traded to the Montreal Canadiens three weeks later, and subsequently sold to the Salt Lake Golden Eagles of the WHL. Salt Lake would also trade him, to the Seattle Totems.

Schmautz was signed as a free agent in 1970 by the Vancouver Canucks, an expansion team starting their first season in the NHL. Though he started the season in the WHL, he joined the Canucks in February 1971. He led the team in scoring during the 1972–73 season with 38 goals and 33 assists, and had the second-most hat-tricks in the NHL with three. He was named to the 1973 and 1974 NHL All-Star Games.

Schmautz was subsequently traded to the Boston Bruins midway through the 1974 season. Playing under Bruin coach Don Cherry, Schmautz developed into an accomplished forechecker and backchecker, usually playing right wing on a line with future Hall-of-Famer Johnny Bucyk and versatile center Gregg Sheppard. He spent five seasons with Boston in all, finishing ninth in the NHL in game-winning goals in 1976 and 1978. Schmautz scored the overtime goal for Boston in Game Four of the 1978 Stanley Cup Final versus Montreal to level the series at two games apiece. A photograph of Schmautz celebrating his goal was used as the cover photo for the Bruins' 1978–1979 media guide. Overall, Schmautz scored 26 playoff goals for Boston – the same total as Bobby Orr. At the time of Schmautz's death, he ranked 20th in Boston history with 56 playoff points. Schmautz was known for having perhaps the greatest snapshot in the game.

He then briefly played for the Colorado Rockies and Edmonton Oilers, before signing back with Vancouver in 1980. After the 1980–81 season, Schmautz was not offered a new contract by the Canucks, so he opted to retire. He subsequently moved to Portland, Oregon and worked in roofing.

== Personal life ==
Two of Schmautz's brothers also played hockey. Cliff Schmautz played one season in the NHL at the same position as Bobby, appearing in 57 games for the Buffalo Sabres and Philadelphia Flyers and scoring 32 points in 1970–71. Arnie Schmautz played 13 seasons in the WHL with the New Westminster Royals, Victoria Cougars, and Portland Buckaroos. Both his brothers predeceased him.

Schmautz was diagnosed with pancreatic cancer in March 2020 and died on March 28, 2021, his 76th birthday, at his home in Peoria, Arizona.

== Career statistics ==
=== Regular season and playoffs ===
			Regular season					Playoffs
Season	Team	League	GP	G	A	Pts	PIM	GP	G	A	Pts	PIM
1962–63	Saskatoon Quakers	SJHL	54	28	31	59	42	—	—	—	—	—
1962–63	Saskatoon Quakers	SSHL	—	—	—	—	—	7	1	1	2	0
1963–64	Saskatoon Quakers	SJHL	60	55	43	98	114	12	12	12	24	20
1964–65	Saskatoon Blades	SJHL	44	45	34	79	113	5	4	4	8	10
1964–65	Los Angeles Blades	WHL	5	0	1	1	0	—	—	—	—	—
1965–66	Los Angeles Blades	WHL	70	7	16	23	27	—	—	—	—	—
1966–67	Los Angeles Blades	WHL	37	3	7	10	19	—	—	—	—	—
1967–68	Chicago Black Hawks	NHL	13	3	2	5	6	11	2	3	5	2
1967–68	Dallas Black Hawks	CPHL	54	23	23	46	83	—	—	—	—	—
1968–69	Chicago Black Hawks	NHL	63	9	7	16	37	—	—	—	—	—
1969–70	Salt Lake Golden Eagles	WHL	12	5	7	12	17	—	—	—	—	—
1969–70	Seattle Totems	WHL	66	32	27	59	89	3	0	2	2	5
1970–71	Vancouver Canucks	NHL	26	5	5	10	14	—	—	—	—	—
1971–72	Vancouver Canucks	NHL	60	12	13	25	82	—	—	—	—	—
1971–72	Rochester Americans	AHL	7	7	8	15	8	—	—	—	—	—
1972–73	Vancouver Canucks	NHL	77	38	33	71	137	—	—	—	—	—
1973–74	Vancouver Canucks	NHL	49	26	19	45	58	—	—	—	—	—
1973–74	Boston Bruins	NHL	27	7	13	20	31	16	3	6	9	44
1974–75	Boston Bruins	NHL	56	21	30	51	63	3	1	5	6	6
1975–76	Boston Bruins	NHL	75	28	34	62	116	11	2	8	10	13
1976–77	Boston Bruins	NHL	57	23	29	52	62	14	11	1	12	10
1977–78	Boston Bruins	NHL	54	27	27	54	87	15	7	8	15	11
1978–79	Boston Bruins	NHL	65	20	22	42	77	11	2	2	4	6
1979–80	Boston Bruins	NHL	20	8	6	14	8	—	—	—	—	—
1979–80	Edmonton Oilers	NHL	29	8	8	16	20	—	—	—	—	—
1979–80	Colorado Rockies	NHL	20	9	4	13	53	—	—	—	—	—
1980–81	Vancouver Canucks	NHL	73	27	34	61	137	3	0	0	0	0
NHL totals			764	271	286	557	988	84	28	33	61	92
