= Arnie Schmautz =

Canadian ice hockey player

- Born: July 3, 1933; Ituna, Saskatchewan, Canada
- Died: September 13, 2016 (aged 83); Medford, Oregon, U.S.
- Height: 5 ft 7 in (170 cm)
- Weight: 140 lb (64 kg; 10 st 0 lb)
- Position: Right wing
- Shot: Right
- Played for: New Westminster Royals; Victoria Cougars; Portland Buckaroos
- Playing career: 1951–1975

Arnold Wilfred Schmautz (July 3, 1933 – September 13, 2016) was a Canadian professional hockey player who played 934 games in the Western Hockey League, spending time with the New Westminster Royals, Victoria Cougars, and Portland Buckaroos.
