= List of Minnesota North Stars head coaches =

The Minnesota North Stars were an American professional ice hockey team based in Bloomington, Minnesota, a city in the U.S. metropolitan statistical area of Minneapolis–Saint Paul. The team joined the NHL in 1967 as an expansion team with five other teams; the Cleveland Barons, another 1967 NHL expansion team, were merged with the North Stars in the 1978–79 season. The North Stars played in the Stanley Cup Final twice: as the Prince of Wales Conference champions in the 1980–81 season, and in the 1990–91 season after winning the Clarence S. Campbell Bowl, but lost in both Finals. The North Stars played their home games at the Met Center. The team relocated to Dallas, Texas in 1993, after former owner Norman Green announced that he was moving the team to Dallas's Reunion Arena in search of a better economic situation, and are now known as the Dallas Stars. The North Stars played in the Norris Division of the Clarence Campbell Conference in the National Hockey League (NHL) in their last season. There were 16 head coaches for the North Stars team.

The North Stars' first head coach and general manager was Wren Blair, who coached for the first three seasons, and was the North Stars' general manager until 1974; Jack Gordon, Lou Nanne, and Bob Gainey were also the general manager of the North Stars during their tenures as head coach. Nine of the first twelve North Stars head coaches lasted less than two complete seasons, while ten of the first twelve head coaches have spent their entire NHL head coaching careers with the North Stars. Gordon was the first North Stars head coach to have coached more than two complete seasons, with four.

Several head coaches have had multiple tenures with the North Stars. Glen Sonmor served three terms as North Stars head coach. He is the North Stars' all-time leader for the most regular-season games coached, regular-season game wins, regular-season points, playoff games coached, and playoff-game wins. Sonmor's first term lasted five seasons, the longest duration for one North Stars head coach term; his last term lasted two games, which was the shortest tenure. Blair, Gordon and Charlie Burns each served two terms as the North Stars' head coach. None of their second terms were winning seasons.

Burns, Ted Harris, Parker MacDonald, Nanne, and Murray Oliver had once played for the North Stars; Burns is the only person to have been a player-coach for the North Stars, having done so in the 1969–70 season. 1980 U.S. Olympic "Miracle on Ice" coach Herb Brooks, who coached the North Stars in the 1987–88 season, is the only North Stars head coach to have been elected to the Hockey Hall of Fame as a builder; Harry Howell and Gainey were inducted as players. Sonmor and Gainey are the only head coaches to reach the Stanley Cup Final with the North Stars, in the 1981 and 1991 Finals respectively. Gainey was the last head coach of the North Stars; he coached the franchise until the 1995–96 season.

== Key ==
General
#	Number of coaches (Note: A running total of the number of coaches of the North Stars. Thus, any coach who has two or more separate terms as head coach is only counted once.)
*	Spent entire NHL coaching career with the North Stars
†	Elected to the Hockey Hall of Fame as a builder
Achievements	Achievements during their North Stars head coaching tenure

Regular-season
GC	Games coached	T	Ties = 1 point
W	Wins = 2 points	PTS	Points
L	Losses = 0 points	Win%	Winning percentage

Playoffs
PGC	Games coached
PW	Wins
PL	Losses
PWin%	Winning percentage

== Head coaches ==
#	Name	Term (Note: Each year is linked to an article about that particular NHL season.)	GC	W	L	T	PTS	Win%	PGC	PW	PL	PWin%	Achievements	Reference
1	Wren Blair*	1967–1968	84	30	38	16	76	.452	14	7	7	.500		
2	John Muckler	1968–1969	35	6	23	6	18	.257	—	—	—	—		
—	Wren Blair*	1969–1969	63	18	27	18	54	.429	—	—	—	—		
3	Charlie Burns*	1969–1970	44	10	22	12	32	.364	6	2	4	.333		
4	Jack Gordon*	1970–1973	251	105	101	45	255	.508	25	11	14	.440		
5	Parker MacDonald	1973–1974	61	20	30	11	51	.418	—	—	—	—		
—	Jack Gordon*	1974–1975	38	11	22	5	27	.355	—	—	—	—		
—	Charlie Burns*	1975	42	12	28	2	26	.310	—	—	—	—		
6	Ted Harris*	1975–1977	179	48	104	27	123	.344	2	0	2	.000		
7	Andre Beaulieu*	1977–1978	32	6	23	3	15	.234	—	—	—	—		
8	Lou Nanne*	1978	29	7	18	4	18	.310	—	—	—	—		
9	Harry Howell*	1978	11	3	6	2	8	.364	—	—	—	—		
10	Glen Sonmor*	1978–1983	352	155	125	72	382	.543	38	21	17	.553	1980–81 Prince of Wales Conference champions	
11	Murray Oliver*	1983	37	18	12	7	43	.581	9	4	5	.444		
12	Bill Mahoney*	1983–1984	93	42	39	12	96	.516	16	7	9	.438		
—	Glen Sonmor*	1984–1985	67	22	35	10	54	.403	9	5	4	.556		
13	Lorne Henning	1985–1987	158	68	72	18	154	.487	5	2	3	.400		
—	Glen Sonmor*	1987	2	0	1	1	1	.250	—	—	—	—		
14	Herb Brooks†	1987–1988	80	19	48	13	51	.319	—	—	—	—		
15	Pierre Page	1988–1990	160	63	77	20	146	.456	12	4	8	.333		
16	Bob Gainey	1990–1993	244	95	119	30	220	.451	30	17	13	.567	1990–91 Clarence S. Campbell Bowl winner	

== Head coaches with multiple tenures ==
Name	Term	GC	W	L	T	PTS	Win%	PGC	PW	PL	PWin%	Reference
Wren Blair*	1967–1968, 1969–1969	147	48	65	34	130	.442	14	7	7	.500	
Charlie Burns*	1969–1970, 1975	86	22	50	14	58	.337	6	2	4	.333	
Jack Gordon*	1970–1973, 1974–1975	289	116	123	50	282	.488	25	11	14	.440	
Glen Sonmor*	1978–1983, 1984–1985, 1987	421	177	161	83	437	.519	47	26	21	.553	
