= Glen Sonmor =

Canadian ice hockey player, coach (1929–2015)

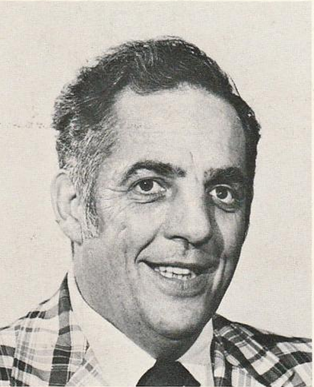
- Born: April 22, 1929 Moose Jaw, Saskatchewan, Canada
- Died: December 14, 2015 (aged 86) Brantford, Ontario, Canada
- Height: 5 ft 11 in (180 cm)
- Weight: 165 lb (75 kg; 11 st 11 lb)
- Position: Left wing
- Shot: Left
- Played for: NHL; New York Rangers; AHL; Cleveland Barons; St. Louis Flyers
- Playing career: 1950–1955

Glen Robert Sonmor (April 22, 1929 – December 14, 2015) was a Canadian professional ice hockey player, scout and coach. He played 28 games in the National Hockey League with the New York Rangers from 1953 to 1955, though most of his career was spent in the minor American Hockey League. After his playing career, Sonmor turned to coaching. He led the University of Minnesota from 1966 to 1972, then went to the World Hockey Association, where he was the general manager, and occasional coach, of the Minnesota Fighting Saints and Birmingham Bulls between 1972 and 1978. He then moved to the NHL to coach the Minnesota North Stars from 1978 to 1987. Later in his career, Sonmor became a scout for the Minnesota Wild of the NHL.

== Early life ==
Born in Moose Jaw, Saskatchewan, Sonmor's family moved to Hamilton, Ontario, where he played on multiple school teams, playing point guard in basketball, quarterback in football and left wing in hockey, as well as pitching in semi-pro baseball. Sonmor focused on hockey after graduation and signed a C form with the Cleveland Barons of the American Hockey League, committing him to the team if he ever turned pro. Sonmor then played junior hockey with the Guelph Biltmores in the Ontario Hockey Association (OHA) and the Brandon Wheat Kings of the Manitoba Junior Hockey League (MJHL). The 1948–49 Brandon team went on to win the MJHL championship, defeating the Calgary Buffalos for the Abbott Cup, but lost in the Memorial Cup championship to the Montreal Royals. Sonmor led the way for the Wheat Kings with 18 goals and 30 assists in 30 regular season games and 10 goals and 14 assists in 25 playoff games. The 1948–49 team was named to the Manitoba Hockey Hall of Fame in 2006.

== Professional career ==
In 1949, Sonmor was sent by Cleveland to the Minneapolis Millers in the United States Hockey League and his play attracted the attention of the parent club. From 1949 to 1954, Sonmor played predominantly for the Barons but spent the 1951–52 season with the St. Louis Flyers, and recorded consecutive 20-goal seasons.

Sonmor spent part of the 1953–54 season with the National Hockey League (NHL) New York Rangers before Cleveland officially traded him to the team on 15 November 1954 for eventual Hall of Famer Andy Bathgate and Vic Howe. In the NHL, Sonmor was considered a highly physical player known for his fighting abilities, as he recorded only 2 goals in 30 games over the 1953–54 and 1954–55 seasons. On 27 February 1955, Sonmor suffered a career-ending injury to his left eye when he was hit by a slap shot from teammate Steve Kraftcheck. Sonmor's injury came four days after the birth of his daughter Kathy, putting both him and his wife in the hospital at the same time. Later stories of Sonmor's glass eye popping out onto the Minnesota North Stars bench during his coaching career are told by the North Stars' General Manager, Lou Nanne.

== Coaching career ==
Following his retirement from the NHL, Sonmor was hired to be the freshman hockey coach at the University of Minnesota by longtime coach, and AHL and USHL teammate, John Mariucci. He then coached many amateur hockey teams including various levels in Junior hockey, at the Ohio State University, before returning to Minnesota as the varsity coach. Sonmor coached the University of Minnesota's Golden Gophers from 1966 to 1971, which included a Western Collegiate Hockey Association (WCHA) regular season championship in the 1969–70 season and a WCHA playoff championship in the 1970–71 season.

In 1972, Sonmor moved up to the professional level when he joined the fledgling Minnesota Fighting Saints of the World Hockey Association (WHA) as coach and general manager. In the middle of the season, Sonmor gave up his coaching duties but continued as GM. After the team folded in 1976, the WHA's Cleveland Crusaders moved to St. Paul and changed their name to the "New Fighting Saints", and Sonmor was hired as the team's coach and general manager. However, much like their predecessor the new Saints folded in January 1977. Sonmor then went on to coach the WHA's Birmingham Bulls and stayed there through the end of the 1977–78 season. In 1978, Sonmor was named head coach of the Minnesota North Stars of the National Hockey League (NHL) and went on to three different coaching tenures with the team (1978–1983, 1984–1985, and 1986–1987). Sonmor's teams made the playoffs four of six full seasons and he led the team to the 1981 Stanley Cup Finals, where they lost to the heavily-favored New York Islanders. However, Sonmor's career with the North Stars was overshadowed by several bar fights, and alcoholism that ultimately led him away time and time again from his coaching duties to enter alcoholism treatment. He eventually gave up drinking in 1983 after being suspended by the North Stars in January after a particularly bad episode in Pittsburgh. Sonmor stepped down for good after the last two games of the 1986–87 season for health reasons, leaving with a record of 174–161–82 in 417 games during his tenure.

== Later life ==
After retiring as a coach, Sonmor predominantly worked as a radio analyst for University of Minnesota hockey games on the Golden Gopher Radio Network, which includes WCCO-AM. Sonmor is a recipient of an honorary "M" by the University and became an "M Club" Hall of Fame inductee in 2007. From 1994-96, Sonmor was the director of player development for the Minnesota Moose of the International Hockey League (IHL). In 2000, Sonmor was hired by the National Hockey League's Minnesota Wild, as a scout evaluating high school talent for the club in preparation for the NHL entry draft. On February 3, 2011, the then-81-year-old Sonmor announced that he planned to retire from the Gopher broadcast booth following the end of the 2011 season. During a February 18/19 series against the University of Wisconsin, Wally Shaver was joined in the WCCO broadcast booth by injured Gopher forward Zach Budish instead of Sonmor. Shortly following the series, it was announced that Sonmor would retire effective immediately, as opposed to finishing the season.

In 2006, Sonmor was awarded the Lester Patrick Trophy for outstanding service to hockey in the United States along with Steve Yzerman, Marcel Dionne, Reed Larson, and Red Berenson.

He is the author, with Ross Bernstein, of the autobiographical Old Time Hockey: Memories and Musings of a Lifetime on Ice.

Sonmor returned to Canada from the United States in 2013 and settled in Paris, Ontario. He died in a nursing home in Brantford, Ontario, from pneumonia on December 14, 2015, at the age of 86. He also had Alzheimer's disease.

== Career statistics ==
=== Regular season and playoffs ===
			Regular season					Playoffs
Season	Team	League	GP	G	A	Pts	PIM	GP	G	A	Pts	PIM
1945–46	Hamilton Lloyds	OHA	1	0	1	1	0	—	—	—	—	—
1946–47	Hamilton Szabos	OHA-B	—	—	—	—	—	—	—	—	—	—
1947–48	Guelph Biltmores	OHA	36	21	15	36	20	—	—	—	—	—
1948–49	Brandon Wheat Kings	MJHL	30	18	30	48	40	7	2	5	7	11
1948–49	Brandon Wheat Kings	M-Cup	—	—	—	—	—	18	8	9	17	33
1949–50	Minneapolis Millers	USHL	55	17	43	60	25	7	2	4	6	7
1950–51	Cleveland Barons	AHL	65	14	35	49	47	11	3	4	7	14
1951–52	St. Louis Flyers	AHL	67	24	30	54	32	—	—	—	—	—
1952–53	Cleveland Barons	AHL	64	25	26	51	62	11	0	2	2	18
1953–54	New York Rangers	NHL	15	2	0	2	17	—	—	—	—	—
1953–54	Cleveland Barons	AHL	31	13	12	25	45	—	—	—	—	—
1954–55	New York Rangers	NHL	13	0	0	0	4	—	—	—	—	—
1954–55	Cleveland Barons	AHL	36	11	21	32	34	—	—	—	—	—
AHL totals			263	87	124	211	220	22	3	6	9	32
NHL totals			28	2	0	2	21	—	—	—	—	—

== Head coaching record ==
=== College ===
Record table
Season	Team	Overall	Conference	Standing	Postseason
Ohio State Buckeyes Independent (1965–1966)
1965–66	Ohio State	9–7–0			
Ohio State:		9–7–0			
Minnesota Golden Gophers (WCHA / Big Ten) (1966–1971)
1966–67	Minnesota	9–19–1	5–17–1 / 2–5–1	8th / 3rd	WCHA first round
1967–68	Minnesota	19–12–0	13–9–0 / 3–5–0	5th / 2nd	WCHA second round
1968–69	Minnesota	13–13–3	11–9–2 / 4–5–1	6th / 3rd	WCHA East Regional semifinals
1969–70	Minnesota	21–12–0	18–8–0 / 8–4–0	1st / 1st	WCHA East Regional Finals
1970–71	Minnesota	14–17–1	9–12–1 / 5–5–0	5th / 3rd	NCAA runner-up
1971–72	Minnesota	1–7–0†	1–7–0 / 1–1–0†	–	–
Minnesota:		77–80–5	59–62–4 / 23–25–2		
Total:		86–87–5			
National champion Postseason invitational champion Conference regular season champion Conference regular season and conference tournament champion Division regular season champion Division regular season and conference tournament champion Conference tournament champion

†Sonmor resigned in December 1971

=== WHA/NHL ===
Team	Year	Regular season						Postseason			
Team	Year	G	W	L	T	Pts	Finish	W	L	Win %	Result
MFS	1972–73	59	28	28	3	(79)	(resigned)	—	—	—	—
MFS	1976–77	42	19	18	5	43	(team folded)	—	—	—	—
BIR	1977–78	77	36	38	3	75	6th in WHA	1	4	.200	Lost in quarterfinals (WPG)
MNS	1978–79	69	25	34	10	(68)	4th in Adams	—	—	—	Missed playoffs
MNS	1979–80	80	36	28	16	88	3rd in Adams	8	7	.533	Lost in league semi-finals (PHI)
MNS	1980–81	80	35	28	17	87	3rd in Adams	12	7	.632	Lost in Stanley Cup Final (NYI)
MNS	1981–82	80	37	23	7	93	1st in Norris	1	3	.250	Lost in division semifinals (CHI)
MNS	1982–83	43	22	12	9	(96)	(suspended indefinitely)	—	—	—	—
MNS	1984–85	67	22	35	10	(62)	4th in Norris	5	4	.556	Lost in division finals (CHI)
MNS	1986–87	2	0	1	1	(70)	(interim)	—	—	—	—
WHA totals		178	83	84	11	177		1	4	.200	
NHL totals		421	177	161	83	437		26	21	.553	
Totals		599	260	245	94			27	25	.519	

Sporting positions
Preceded by Harry Howell; Bill Mahoney; Lorne Henning	Head coach of the Minnesota North Stars; 1978–83; 1984–85; 1987	Succeeded by Murray Oliver; Lorne Henning; Herb Brooks
Awards and achievements
Preceded by John Matchefts	WCHA Coach of the Year; 1969–70	Succeeded by John MacInnes
Preceded by Ned Harkness	Hobey Baker Legends of College Hockey Award; 1999; With: John MacInnes	Succeeded by Bob Johnson
