= Harry Howell (ice hockey) =

Canadian ice hockey player (1932–2019)

- Hockey Hall of Fame, 1979
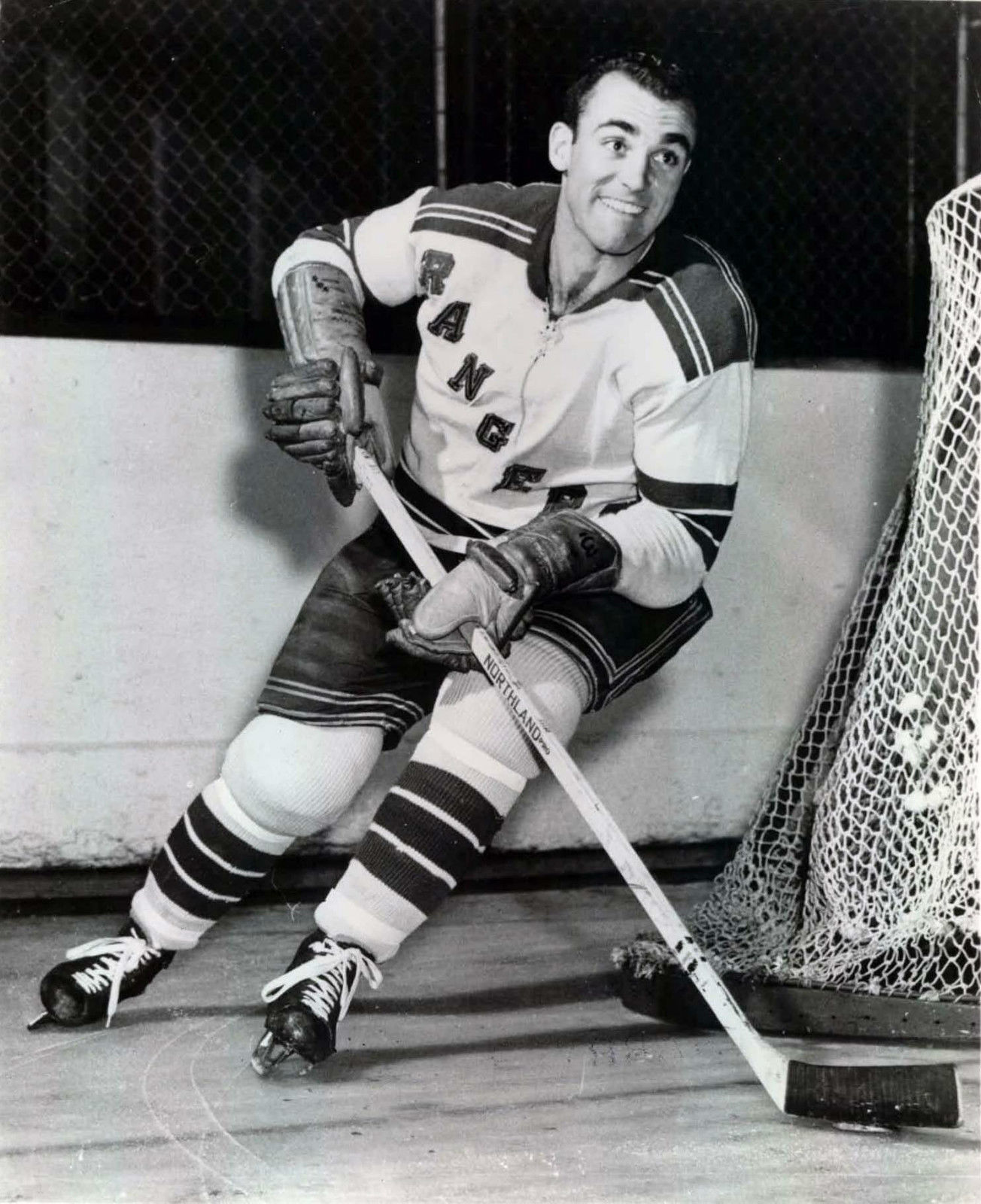
- Howell with the New York Rangers in 1952
- Born: December 28, 1932 Hamilton, Ontario, Canada
- Died: March 9, 2019 (aged 86) Hamilton, Ontario, Canada
- Height: 6 ft 1 in (185 cm)
- Weight: 195 lb (88 kg; 13 st 13 lb)
- Position: Defence
- Shot: Left
- Played for: New York Rangers; California Golden Seals; Los Angeles Kings; New York Golden Blades; San Diego Mariners; Calgary Cowboys
- Playing career: 1952–1976

Henry Vernon Howell (December 28, 1932 – March 9, 2019) was a Canadian professional hockey player who was a defenceman for 21 seasons in the National Hockey League (NHL) for the New York Rangers, California Golden Seals, and Los Angeles Kings. He also played three seasons in the World Hockey Association (WHA) for the New York Golden Blades / Jersey Knights, San Diego Mariners, and Calgary Cowboys.

A defensive stalwart and star for the Rangers for a franchise record 1,160 games, Howell won the James Norris Memorial Trophy for his play in 1967 and was named to the NHL All-Star Game seven times. Nicknamed "Harry the Horse", Howell departed the NHL for the WHA in 1973 and briefly held the record for most games played for his position. He served as player-coach for the New York Golden Blades (who subsequently relocated to Jersey and San Diego) from 1973 to 1975. He played one further season with Calgary before retiring in 1976, having played over 1,500 combined games in hockey.

After his playing career, Howell worked as general manager of the Cleveland Barons in the NHL during the 1977–78 season and coached the opening eleven games of the following year with the Minnesota North Stars. He was inducted into the Hockey Hall of Fame in 1979. He later served as a scout for the North Stars and Edmonton Oilers.

== Early life ==
Howell was born in Hamilton, Ontario for a father who served as a furrier; Howell played hockey with the Hamilton Police Minor League as a youth. He attended Westdale Secondary School and Guelph Collegiate Vocational Institute in Guelph, Ontario. He broke in with the Guelph Biltmores (a farm team for the New York Rangers) in 1950. He won the 1952 Memorial Cup with the team.

== Career ==
Howell joined the New York Rangers as one of fourteen rookies for the 1952–53 season. He played his first game on October 18, 1952 against the Toronto Maple Leafs. He scored his first goal during the game, apparently by accident. According to Howell, he lofted a backhanded shot towards the goal during a shift change that went over the shoulder of goaltender Harry Lumley, who didn't see it due to being screened.

In 1955, he was named captain, but gave up that position after two seasons, as he felt he played poorly those years.

A stalwart, stay-at-home defenceman, Howell used his hockey sense and positioning that saw him play at least 50 games in each of his first eighteen seasons. The 1966–67 season saw him reach a career high in goals (12) and points (40), which he credited to powerplay teammate Bernie Geoffrion, who would pass him the puck and tell him to shoot. On January 21, 1967, he became the first Ranger with 1,000 games played. The team honored him with a "Harry Howell Night" at Madison Square Garden on January 25, 1967, the first player to be honored by the team with their own night. Later that year, Howell was the last player in the pre-expansion era to win the Norris Trophy, and famously said that he was glad he won the trophy then because Boston Bruins rookie Bobby Orr (who finished third that year) would "own this trophy from now on"; Orr would win the trophy for the next eight seasons. Howell's playing weight was 195 and he stood 6 foot 1 inches tall. He played seventeen years wearing number 3 for the Rangers.

Prior to the 1969–70 season, his back problems came to a head to where he had spinal-fusion surgery. He was offered a front-office position with the Rangers if he retired, but he was interested in still playing, so he was sold to the Oakland Seals on June 10, 1969. He would be traded from the Seals in the middle of the 1970–71 season to the Los Angeles Kings, where he played the next two years. The Kings released him in July 1973. He was offered a coaching position in Portland, but he decided he still wanted to play hockey, which led to him joining the World Hockey Association with the New York Golden Blades for the 1973–74 WHA season. After seven games with the Golden Blades, on November 21, 1973, Howell was elevated to player-coach when the team was moved and became the Jersey Knights for the remainder of the season. At the end of that season, the Knights moved and became the San Diego Mariners, with Howell still performing double duty as player-coach. Although the 1974-75 WHA season saw the team reach the 1975 WHA playoffs and win a playoff series (before losing to Houston in the semifinals), Howell was fired in June 1975. Howell was strictly a player for the 1975–76 WHA season with the Calgary Cowboys, his final one as a player.

Howell played 1,411 NHL games and 170 WHA games, scoring 101 goals and 360 assists for 461 points.

== Post-playing career ==
After retiring as a player, Howell became general manager of the Cleveland Barons for the 1977–78 NHL season. The Barons were in dire financial circumstances, and merged with the equally challenged Minnesota North Stars at the end of that season. Howell became head coach of the merged Minnesota North Stars for the 1978–79 season in July 1978 but resigned in November after only 11 games, stating that he wasn't happy as a coach. He became a scout for the team.

Howell was hired as a scout for the Edmonton Oilers prior to the 1989–90 season. He earned a Stanley Cup ring when the Oilers won the Cup that year. He served as a scount until the close of the 1999–2000 season. In 2000, he re-joined the Rangers as a scout and worked in that role until retiring in 2004.

== Legacy ==
Nicknamed "Harry the Horse", Rangers goaltender Ed Giacomin once stated that Howell stopped more shots than he did for the team. Selected to the NHL All-Star Game seven times with a First-Team selection in 1967, Howell departed from the NHL with the most games played by a defenceman with 1,411. Success in the playoffs eluded Howell during his career, as the Rangers lost in the first round of the playoffs (which until 1967 was played by only four teams) each time; he scored three goals in 38 postseason games. The only time that he was on a team that won a postseason series was with the Mariners in the 1975 WHA playoffs, where he recorded one goal in five games. He still holds the record for most games played for the New York Rangers with 1,160; only Brian Leetch and Rod Gilbert have played 1,000 games for the Rangers since Howell departed the team.

Emile Francis, Howell's coach for four seasons, stated that "Hockey is a game of mistakes, and Harry doesn't make many of them." When paired with him for training camp in 1968 as a rookie, Brad Park stated that Howell "treated me like an equal, not like a rookie."

On June 12, 1979, Howell was announced for induction into the Hockey Hall of Fame. Howell, alongside his teammate Andy Bathgate, had their jerseys retired by the Rangers on February 22, 2009.

On October 18, 2014, the North Wentworth Community Centre in Flamborough, Ontario was renamed the Harry Howell Arena at a ceremony. In that same month, he was honored by Canada Post as the Rangers representative on a stamp representing the "Original Six" NHL teams.

In the 2009 book 100 Ranger Greats, the authors ranked Howell at No. 10 all-time of the 901 New York Rangers who had played during the team's first 82 seasons.

== Personal life and death ==
In his later years, Howell was diagnosed with Alzheimer's disease. He was living in a long-term care facility in Ancaster near Hamilton at the time of his death. He was married to his wife Marilyn for 64 years prior to her death in February 2019. Howell died on March 9, 2019, at the age of 86.

== Career statistics ==
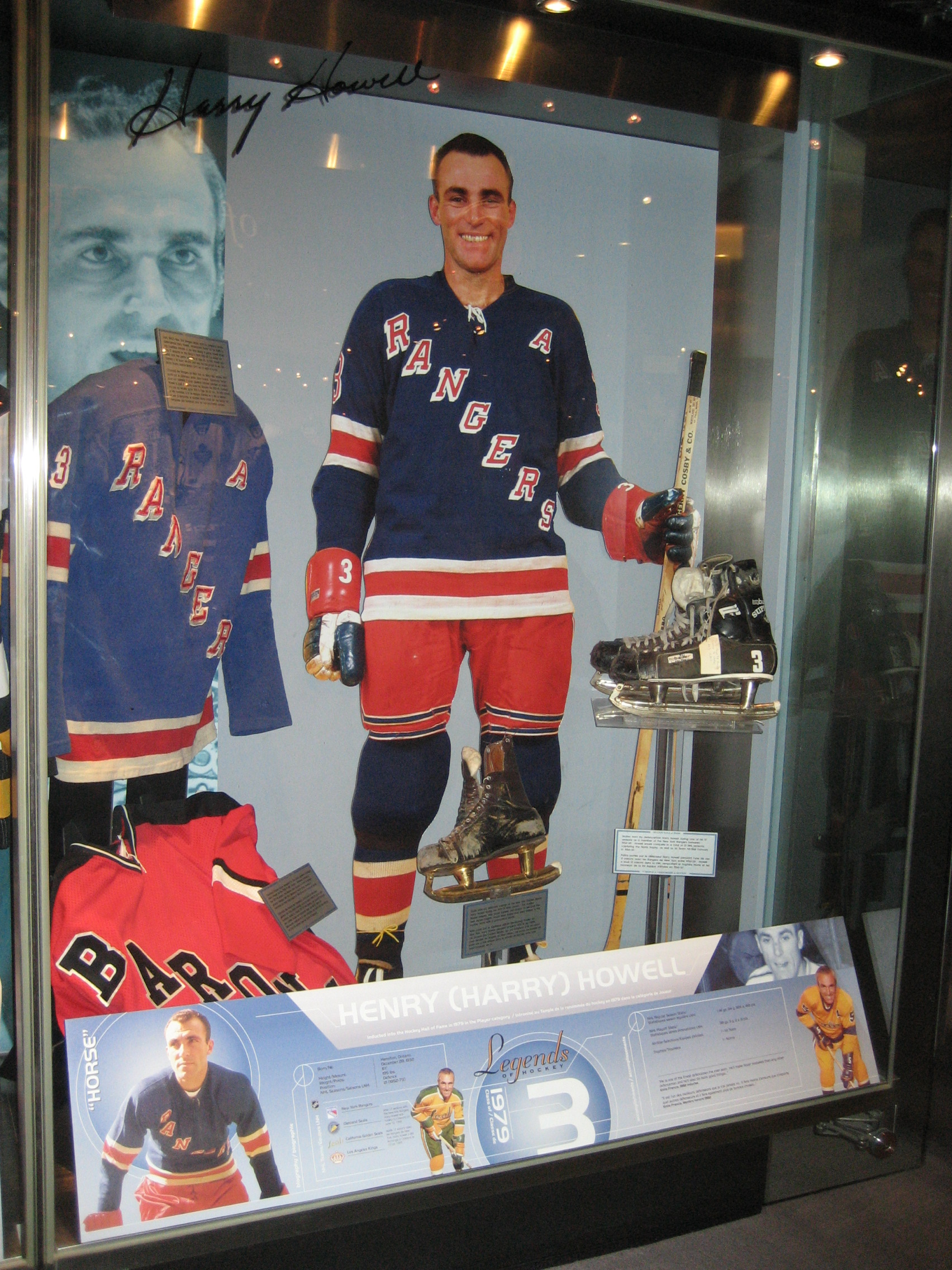
Harry Howell's exhibit at the Hockey Hall of Fame.

=== Regular season and playoffs ===
			Regular season					Playoffs
Season	Team	League	GP	G	A	Pts	PIM	GP	G	A	Pts	PIM
1951–52	Guelph Biltmores	OHA	51	17	20	37	0	—	—	—	—	—
1951–52	Cincinnati Mohawks	AHL	1	0	0	0	0	—	—	—	—	—
1952–53	Guelph Biltmores	OHA	5	2	2	4	0	—	—	—	—	—
1952–53	New York Rangers	NHL	67	3	8	11	46	—	—	—	—	—
1953–54	New York Rangers	NHL	67	7	9	16	58	—	—	—	—	—
1954–55	New York Rangers	NHL	70	2	14	16	87	—	—	—	—	—
1955–56	New York Rangers	NHL	70	3	15	18	77	5	0	1	1	4
1956–57	New York Rangers	NHL	65	2	10	12	70	5	1	0	1	6
1957–58	New York Rangers	NHL	70	4	7	11	62	6	1	0	1	8
1958–59	New York Rangers	NHL	70	4	10	14	101	—	—	—	—	—
1959–60	New York Rangers	NHL	67	7	6	13	58	—	—	—	—	—
1960–61	New York Rangers	NHL	70	7	10	17	62	—	—	—	—	—
1961–62	New York Rangers	NHL	66	6	15	21	89	6	0	1	1	8
1962–63	New York Rangers	NHL	70	5	20	25	55	—	—	—	—	—
1963–64	New York Rangers	NHL	70	5	31	36	75	—	—	—	—	—
1964–65	New York Rangers	NHL	68	2	20	22	63	—	—	—	—	—
1965–66	New York Rangers	NHL	70	4	29	33	92	—	—	—	—	—
1966–67	New York Rangers	NHL	70	12	28	40	54	4	0	0	0	4
1967–68	New York Rangers	NHL	74	5	24	29	62	6	1	0	1	0
1968–69	New York Rangers	NHL	56	4	7	11	36	2	0	0	0	0
1969–70	Oakland Seals	NHL	55	4	16	20	52	4	0	1	1	2
1970–71	California Golden Seals	NHL	28	0	9	9	14	—	—	—	—	—
1970–71	Los Angeles Kings	NHL	18	3	8	11	4	—	—	—	—	—
1971–72	Los Angeles Kings	NHL	77	1	17	18	53	—	—	—	—	—
1972–73	Los Angeles Kings	NHL	73	4	11	15	28	—	—	—	—	—
1973–74	New York Golden Blades/Jersey Knights	WHA	65	3	23	26	24	—	—	—	—	—
1974–75	San Diego Mariners	WHA	74	4	10	14	28	5	1	0	1	10
1975–76	Calgary Cowboys	WHA	31	0	3	3	6	2	0	0	0	2
NHL totals			1,411	94	324	418	1,298	38	3	3	6	32
WHA totals			170	7	36	43	58	7	1	0	1	12

== NHL/WHA Coaching record ==
Team	Year	Regular season						Postseason			
Team	Year	G	W	L	T	Pts	Finish	W	L	Win %	Result
NY/NJ	1973–74	58	26	30	2	54	6th in East	—	—	—	—
SDM	1974–75	78	43	31	4	90	2nd in West	4	6	.400	Lost in semifinals (HSA)
MNS	1978–79	11	3	6	2	8	(resigned)	—	—	—	—
WHA Total		136	69	61	6		10	4	6	.400	1 playoff appearance
NHL Total		11	3	6	2						
Totals		147	72	67	8						

== Awards and achievements ==
- Memorial Cup – 1952
- James Norris Memorial Trophy – 1967
- NHL All-Star Game – 1954, 1963, 1964, 1965, 1967, 1968, 1970
- Stanley Cup – 1990 (as scout)
- Most games played for the New York Rangers (1,160)

== See also ==
- List of NHL players with 1,000 games played

Awards
Preceded by Jacques Laperrière	Winner of the Norris Trophy; 1967	Succeeded by Bobby Orr
Sporting positions
Preceded by Don Raleigh	New York Rangers captain 1955–57	Succeeded by George Sullivan
Preceded by Bill McCreary, Sr.	General Manager of the Cleveland Barons; 1977–78	Succeeded by Position abolished
Preceded by Lou Nanne	Head coach of the Minnesota North Stars; 1978	Succeeded by Glen Sonmor
