= Ted Harris (ice hockey) =

Canadian ice hockey player (born 1936)

- Born: July 18, 1936 (age 90) Winnipeg, Manitoba, Canada
- Height: 6 ft 2 in (188 cm)
- Weight: 175 lb (79 kg; 12 st 7 lb)
- Position: Defence
- Shot: Left
- Played for: Montreal Canadiens; Minnesota North Stars; Detroit Red Wings; St. Louis Blues; Philadelphia Flyers
- Playing career: 1956–1975

Edward Alexander Harris (born July 18, 1936) is a Canadian former professional ice hockey player.

== Playing career ==
Harris played in the National Hockey League from 1963 to 1975. During this time, he played for the Montreal Canadiens, Minnesota North Stars, Detroit Red Wings, St. Louis Blues, and Philadelphia Flyers. He won four Stanley Cups with Montreal and a fifth with Philadelphia. He currently resides in southern New Jersey, just outside Philadelphia. Harris also fought Hockey Hall of Fame Rookie Bobby Orr in Orr's first regular season NHL fight.

== Awards and achievements ==
- MJHL First Team Allstar (1955)
- Turnbull Cup (MJHL) Championship (1955)
- Calder Cup (AHL) Championships (1961, 1962, with Springfield
- Calder Cup (AHL) Championships (1964 with Cleveland Barons)
- AHL First All-Star Team (1964)
- Eddie Shore Award Winner (1964)
- NHL Second All-Star Team (1969)
- Played in NHL All-Star Game (1965, 1967, 1969, 1971, 1972)
- Stanley Cup Championships (1965, 1966, 1968, & 1969) with Montreal as Edward Harris
- Stanley Cup Championship (1975) with Philadelphia as Ted Harris
- Ted is an “Honoured Member” of the Manitoba Hockey Hall of Fame

== Career statistics ==
=== Regular season and playoffs ===
			Regular season					Playoffs
Season	Team	League	GP	G	A	Pts	PIM	GP	G	A	Pts	PIM
1953–54	Winnipeg Monarchs	MJHL	36	4	5	9	94	5	1	1	2	10
1954–55	Winnipeg Monarchs	MJHL	32	2	15	17	137	17	1	3	4	57
1955–56	Winnipeg Monarchs	MJHL	20	6	23	29	78	4	0	0	0	21
1956–57	Springfield Indians	AHL	2	0	0	0	4	—	—	—	—	—
1956–57	Philadelphia Ramblers	EHL	61	11	33	44	103	13	2	2	4	31
1957–58	Philadelphia Ramblers	EHL	62	10	19	29	82	—	—	—	—	—
1958–59	Springfield Indians	AHL	9	0	2	2	11	—	—	—	—	—
1958–59	Victoria Cougars	WHL	58	4	12	16	82	3	0	0	0	4
1959–60	Springfield Indians	AHL	63	4	13	17	100	10	0	2	2	16
1960–61	Springfield Indians	AHL	69	4	22	26	76	8	0	1	1	18
1961–62	Springfield Indians	AHL	70	2	29	31	142	11	3	3	6	14
1962–63	Springfield Indians	AHL	72	8	30	38	172	—	—	—	—	—
1963–64	Montreal Canadiens	NHL	4	0	1	1	0	—	—	—	—	—
1963–64	Cleveland Barons	AHL	67	6	23	29	109	9	0	5	5	20
1964–65	Montreal Canadiens	NHL	68	1	14	15	107	13	0	5	5	45
1965–66	Montreal Canadiens	NHL	53	0	13	13	87	10	0	0	0	38
1966–67	Montreal Canadiens	NHL	65	2	16	18	86	10	0	1	1	19
1967–68	Montreal Canadiens	NHL	67	5	16	21	78	13	0	4	4	22
1968–69	Montreal Canadiens	NHL	76	7	18	25	102	14	1	2	3	34
1969–70	Montreal Canadiens	NHL	74	3	17	20	116	—	—	—	—	—
1970–71	Minnesota North Stars	NHL	78	2	13	15	130	12	0	4	4	36
1971–72	Minnesota North Stars	NHL	78	2	15	17	77	7	0	1	1	17
1972–73	Minnesota North Stars	NHL	78	7	23	30	83	5	0	1	1	15
1973–74	Minnesota North Stars	NHL	12	0	1	1	4	—	—	—	—	—
1973–74	Detroit Red Wings	NHL	41	0	11	11	66	—	—	—	—	—
1973–74	St. Louis Blues	NHL	24	0	4	4	16	—	—	—	—	—
1974–75	Philadelphia Flyers	NHL	70	1	6	7	48	16	0	4	4	4
NHL totals			788	30	168	198	1,000	100	1	22	23	230

== NHL coaching record ==
Team	Year	Regular season						Postseason
Team	Year	G	W	L	T	Pts	Finish	Result
Minnesota North Stars	1975–76	80	20	53	7	47	4th in Smythe	Missed playoffs
Minnesota North Stars	1976–77	80	23	39	18	64	2nd in Smythe	Lost in preliminary round
Minnesota North Stars	1977–78	19	5	12	2	(45)	5th in Smythe	(fired)
Total		179	48	104	27	156	-	1 playoff appearance

Preceded by Claude Larose	Minnesota North Stars captain 1970–74	Succeeded by Bill Goldsworthy
Preceded by Gary Bergman	Detroit Red Wings captain 1974	Succeeded by Mickey Redmond
Preceded by Charlie Burns	Head coach of the Minnesota North Stars; 1975–77	Succeeded by André Beaulieu
