= Murray Oliver =

Canadian ice hockey player, coach, and scout

- Born: November 14, 1937 Hamilton, Ontario, Canada
- Died: November 23, 2014 (aged 77) Edina, Minnesota, United States
- Height: 5 ft 10 in (178 cm)
- Weight: 165 lb (75 kg; 11 st 11 lb)
- Position: Centre
- Shot: Left
- Played for: Boston Bruins; Detroit Red Wings; Minnesota North Stars; Toronto Maple Leafs
- Playing career: 1958–1975

Murray Clifford Oliver (November 14, 1937 – November 23, 2014) was a Canadian professional ice hockey centre, coach, and scout. Murray also played Minor League Baseball for the Batavia Indians, then an affiliate of the Cleveland Indians.

== Playing career ==
Oliver grew up in Hamilton and played junior hockey with the Hamilton Tiger Cubs of the Ontario Hockey Association. After scoring 90 points in 52 games as a 20-year-old, he signed a professional contract and was assigned to the Edmonton Flyers, an affiliate of the Detroit Red Wings of the National Hockey League (NHL). As an NHL rookie during the 1959-60 season, he scored 20 goals. His first NHL goal occurred on November 21, 1959, in a 3–3 tie versus Boston. However, Detroit was loaded at the centre position, which made Oliver expendable. He was traded to the Boston Bruins partway through the next season.

Oliver played for the Bruins until 1967. While in Boston, Oliver centred the B.O.W. line with wingers Johnny Bucyk and Tommy Williams, where he starred as a crafty stickhandler and patient playmaker. He put up an NHL career-high 68 points in 1964, despite knee surgery the prior season. He was traded in 1967 to the Toronto Maple Leafs, where he centred a line for three years with Bob Pulford and Ron Ellis.

Oliver was traded on May 22, 1970 (announced May 26) to the Minnesota North Stars in exchange for Terry O'Malley, the rights to Brian Conacher and cash. Previously, the Maple Leafs had attempted to trade Oliver to the St. Louis Blues for goaltender Jacques Plante, but an excess of centres for St. Louis prevented the deal. Similarly, the Chicago Black Hawks were involved in a possible trade, but Chicago's price of Oliver and Bob Pulford in exchange for Jim Pappin was too high for the Maple Leafs, prompting the trade to Minnesota. Oliver played five seasons with the North Stars. He scored an NHL career-high 27 goals in 1971-72. In 1975, after a bitter contract dispute with Stars management, he retired.

In 18 seasons, Oliver played 1127 regular season games and scored 274 goals with 454 assists for a total of 728 points. He played in the NHL All-Star Game five times. After retiring he was hired by former teammate Lou Nanne as Minnesota's assistant coach. He worked with the club until the 1985–86 NHL season, with 37 games as head coach. He became a scout with the Vancouver Canucks and later took over as the club's director of pro scouting. On November 23, 2014, he died of a heart attack at the age of 77.

== Career statistics ==
=== Regular season and playoffs ===
			Regular season					Playoffs
Season	Team	League	GP	G	A	Pts	PIM	GP	G	A	Pts	PIM
1953–54	Burlington Mohawks	CJHL	—	—	—	—	—	—	—	—	—	—
1953–54	Hamilton Tiger Cubs	OHA	2	0	2	2	0	5	1	0	1	0
1954–55	Hamilton Tiger Cubs	OHA	39	5	13	18	19	3	2	0	2	0
1955–56	Hamilton Tiger Cubs	OHA	5	1	1	2	2	—	—	—	—	—
1956–57	Hamilton Tiger Cubs	OHA	52	17	42	59	20	4	3	1	4	0
1957–58	Hamilton Tiger Cubs	OHA	52	34	56	90	37	4	2	5	7	8
1957–58	Detroit Red Wings	NHL	1	0	1	1	0	—	—	—	—	—
1958–59	Edmonton Flyers	WHL	64	33	34	67	35	3	1	1	2	0
1959–60	Detroit Red Wings	NHL	54	20	19	39	16	6	1	0	1	4
1959–60	Edmonton Flyers	WHL	16	8	12	20	6	—	—	—	—	—
1960–61	Detroit Red Wings	NHL	49	11	12	23	8	—	—	—	—	—
1960–61	Boston Bruins	NHL	21	6	10	16	8	—	—	—	—	—
1961–62	Boston Bruins	NHL	70	17	29	46	21	—	—	—	—	—
1962–63	Boston Bruins	NHL	65	22	40	62	38	—	—	—	—	—
1963–64	Boston Bruins	NHL	70	24	44	68	41	—	—	—	—	—
1964–65	Boston Bruins	NHL	65	20	23	43	30	—	—	—	—	—
1965–66	Boston Bruins	NHL	70	18	42	60	30	—	—	—	—	—
1966–67	Boston Bruins	NHL	65	9	26	35	16	—	—	—	—	—
1967–68	Toronto Maple Leafs	NHL	74	16	21	37	18	—	—	—	—	—
1968–69	Toronto Maple Leafs	NHL	76	14	36	50	16	4	1	2	3	0
1969–70	Toronto Maple Leafs	NHL	76	14	33	47	16	—	—	—	—	—
1970–71	Minnesota North Stars	NHL	61	9	23	32	8	12	7	4	11	0
1971–72	Minnesota North Stars	NHL	77	27	29	56	16	7	0	6	6	4
1972–73	Minnesota North Stars	NHL	75	11	31	42	10	6	0	4	4	2
1973–74	Minnesota North Stars	NHL	78	17	20	37	4	—	—	—	—	—
1974–75	Minnesota North Stars	NHL	80	19	15	34	24	—	—	—	—	—
NHL totals			1,127	274	454	728	320	35	9	16	25	10

== NHL coaching record ==
Team	Year	Regular season						Postseason
Team	Year	G	W	L	T	Pts	Finish	Result
Minnesota North Stars	1982–83	37	18	12	7	43	2nd in Norris	Lost in Division Finals

== Minor League Baseball ==
On June 25, 1958, Murray was assigned to play for the Batavia Indians, where scouts hailed him as "one of the greatest athletes we've ever seen". In his debut, which was delayed because of a broken arm he suffered during the hockey season, he went hitless in three at-bats and committed one error. Over only 8 more games, mostly at third base, he batted .185 and committed an error per game, and was released by the Indians.

== Personal ==
Oliver's granddaughter Liz Schepers played ice hockey for the Ohio State Buckeyes, winning the 2022 NCAA National Collegiate Women's Ice Hockey Tournament. Competing in the PWHL, Schepers won the Walter Cup with the Minnesota Frost. For the 2025-26 season, Schepers signed with the Boston Fleet

== See also ==
- List of NHL players with 1,000 games played

Preceded by Glen Sonmor	Head coach of the Minnesota North Stars; 1983	Succeeded by Bill Mahoney
