= Al Shaver =

Canadian sportscaster (1927–2024)

- Born: October 25, 1927; London, Ontario, Canada
- Died: April 22, 2024 (aged 96); Vancouver Island, British Columbia, Canada
- Occupation: Sportscaster
- Years active: 1948–1996, 2000–2001
- Awards: Foster Hewitt Memorial Award (1993)

Allan Nelles Walter Shaver (October 25, 1927 – April 22, 2024) was a Canadian sportscaster who covered the Minnesota North Stars. He won the Foster Hewitt Memorial Award in 1993 and is a member of the media section of the Hockey Hall of Fame. He was also a member of the Minnesota Broadcasting Hall of Fame.

Shaver attended the Lorne Greene Academy of Radio Arts in Toronto, graduating in 1948. He was a play-by-play announcer for radio and television stations in Guelph, Ontario (CJOY), Calgary, Alberta (CJCJ), Medicine Hat, Alberta (CHAT), Edmonton, Alberta (CFRN), Montreal, Quebec (CKGM), Windsor, Ontario (CKWW) and Toronto (CKEY) prior to becoming the North Stars' broadcaster in 1967 on WCCO Radio and later KSTP-AM and WAYL-AM.

Shaver did not follow the North Stars when they moved to Dallas in 1993, opting to stay in the Twin Cities. He called University of Minnesota men's hockey for several seasons, then retired in 1996. His son, Wally, and grandson Jason are also sportscasters. The press box at the Grand Casino Arena, home of the Minnesota Wild, is named after him.

Shaver resided in Qualicum Beach, British Columbia, and was married to Shirley until her death in 2019. Shaver died at his home on Vancouver Island, on April 22, 2024, at the age of 96.
