= André Beaulieu =

Canadian ice hockey player and coach

- Born: January 22, 1940 (age 86) Montreal, Quebec, Canada
- Position: Forward
- Shot: Right
- Played for: Muskegon Zephyrs (IHL)
- Playing career: 1960–1961

André Beaulieu (born January 22, 1940) is a Canadian former professional ice hockey player and coach.

Beaulieu briefly played minor professional hockey during the 1960–61 season in the International Hockey League with the Muskegon Zephyrs, and then joined St. Mary's College of Winona, Minnesota for four years (1961 to 1964).

Beaulieu joined the Minnesota North Stars of the National Hockey League as an assistant coach in 1976, and was elevated to interim head coach of North Stars towards the end of the 1977–78 season. He also coached the Sioux City Musketeers in 1978-79, the Richmond Rifles in 1979-80 and 1980–81, and was an assistant with the New York Rangers in 1980-81.

== NHL Coaching record ==
Team	Year	Regular season						Postseason
Team	Year	G	W	L	T	Pts	Finish	Result
Minnesota North Stars	1977-78	32	6	23	3	(45)	5th in Smythe	(interim coach)

Preceded by Ted Harris	Head coach of the Minnesota North Stars; 1978	Succeeded by Lou Nanne
