= Charlie Burns =

American-born Canadian ice hockey player (1936–2021)

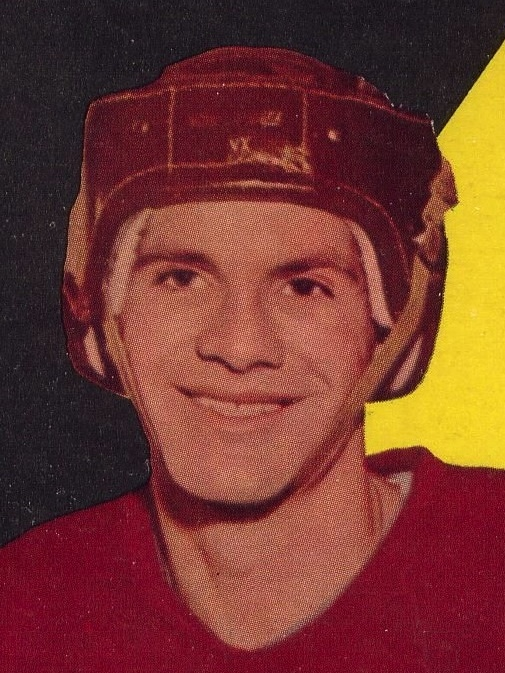
- Born: February 14, 1936 Detroit, Michigan, U.S.
- Died: November 5, 2021 (aged 85) Wallingford, Connecticut, U.S.
- Height: 5 ft 11 in (180 cm)
- Weight: 170 lb (77 kg; 12 st 2 lb)
- Position: Center
- Shot: Left
- Played for: Detroit Red Wings; Boston Bruins; Oakland Seals; Pittsburgh Penguins; Minnesota North Stars
- National team: Canada
- Playing career: 1952–1974
Medal record
Men's ice hockey
Representing Canada
World Championships
| Gold medal – first place | 1958 Oslo |

Charles Frederick Burns (February 14, 1936 – November 5, 2021) was an American-born Canadian professional ice hockey forward who played 749 games in the National Hockey League (NHL) with the Detroit Red Wings, Boston Bruins, Oakland Seals, Pittsburgh Penguins, and Minnesota North Stars between 1958 and 1973. He later worked as the head coach of Minnesota in both 1970 and 1974–75. Burns was mainly known for being an excellent skater, playmaker and defensive player who performed checking and penalty-killing. His trademark was the heavily padded helmet that he was forced to wear after suffering a serious head injury while playing junior hockey in 1954–55.

== Playing career ==
In 1959, he was the only US-born player in the NHL. Burns was born in Detroit, Michigan, his family moved to Toronto, Ontario, when he was a child. Burns chose Canadian citizenship when he turned 21 and later played for the 1958 world champion Whitby Dunlops.

== Post-playing career ==
Burns had three spells as a player-coach, twice with the San Francisco Seals (1965–66 and 1966–67) and one with the Minnesota North Stars (1969–70). He coached the North Stars again in 1974–75 upon his active career retirement. Curiously, all of these were midseason assignments. He coached youth hockey for the Wallingford Hawks of Wallingford, Connecticut, in his spare time. Burns died in Wallingford, Connecticut, on November 5, 2021, at the age of 85.

== Career statistics ==
=== Regular season and playoffs ===
| | | | Regular season | | | | | Playoffs |
| Season | Team | League | GP | G | A | Pts | PIM | GP | G | A | Pts | PIM |
|---|---|---|---|---|---|---|---|---|---|---|---|---|
| 1952–53 | Toronto Marlboros | OHA | 33 | 5 | 7 | 12 | 17 | — | — | — | — | — |
| 1953–54 | Toronto Marlboros | OHA | 59 | 17 | 14 | 31 | 45 | — | — | — | — | — |
| 1954–55 | Toronto Marlboros | OHA | 3 | 0 | 0 | 0 | 0 | — | — | — | — | — |
| 1955–56 | Toronto Marlboros | OHA | 20 | 5 | 8 | 13 | 0 | — | — | — | — | — |
| 1956–57 | Whitby Dunlops | OHA Sr | 40 | 16 | 25 | 41 | 29 | — | — | — | — | — |
| 1957–58 | Whitby Dunlops | OHA Sr | 31 | 24 | 28 | 52 | 32 | — | — | — | — | — |
| 1958–59 | Detroit Red Wings | NHL | 70 | 9 | 11 | 20 | 32 | — | — | — | — | — |
| 1959–60 | Boston Bruins | NHL | 62 | 10 | 17 | 27 | 46 | — | — | — | — | — |
| 1960–61 | Boston Bruins | NHL | 62 | 15 | 26 | 41 | 16 | — | — | — | — | — |
| 1960–61 | Kingston Frontenacs | EPHL | 8 | 3 | 6 | 9 | 4 | — | — | — | — | — |
| 1961–62 | Boston Bruins | NHL | 70 | 11 | 17 | 28 | 43 | — | — | — | — | — |
| 1962–63 | Boston Bruins | NHL | 68 | 12 | 10 | 22 | 13 | — | — | — | — | — |
| 1963–64 | San Francisco Seals | WHL | 68 | 33 | 36 | 69 | 27 | 11 | 1 | 3 | 4 | 2 |
| 1964–65 | San Francisco Seals | WHL | 51 | 27 | 36 | 63 | 19 | — | — | — | — | — |
| 1965–66 | San Francisco Seals | WHL | 40 | 10 | 35 | 45 | 26 | 7 | 1 | 5 | 6 | 0 |
| 1966–67 | California Seals | WHL | 71 | 22 | 38 | 60 | 29 | 6 | 0 | 0 | 0 | 9 |
| 1967–68 | Oakland Seals | NHL | 73 | 9 | 26 | 35 | 20 | — | — | — | — | — |
| 1968–69 | Pittsburgh Penguins | NHL | 76 | 13 | 38 | 51 | 22 | — | — | — | — | — |
| 1969–70 | Minnesota North Stars | NHL | 50 | 3 | 13 | 16 | 10 | 6 | 1 | 0 | 1 | 2 |
| 1970–71 | Minnesota North Stars | NHL | 76 | 9 | 19 | 28 | 13 | 12 | 3 | 3 | 6 | 2 |
| 1971–72 | Minnesota North Stars | NHL | 77 | 11 | 14 | 25 | 24 | 7 | 1 | 1 | 2 | 2 |
| 1972–73 | Minnesota North Stars | NHL | 65 | 4 | 7 | 11 | 13 | 6 | 0 | 0 | 0 | 0 |
| 1973–74 | New Haven Nighthawks | AHL | 64 | 10 | 19 | 29 | 73 | 10 | 1 | 3 | 4 | 16 |
| NHL totals | | | 749 | 106 | 198 | 304 | 252 | 31 | 5 | 4 | 9 | 6 |

== Coaching record ==
| Team | Year | Regular season | | | | | | Postseason | | | |
| Team | Year | G | W | L | T | Pct | Finish | G | W | L | Result |
|---|---|---|---|---|---|---|---|---|---|---|---|
| Minnesota North Stars | 1969–70 | 44 | 10 | 22 | 12 | 0.364 | 3rd in West | 6 | 2 | 4 | Lost in quarter-finals |
| Minnesota North Stars | 1974–75 | 42 | 12 | 28 | 2 | 0.310 | 4th in Smythe | Did not qualify | | | |
| NHL totals | | 86 | 22 | 50 | 14 | .204 | — | 6 | 2 | 4 | 1 playoff appearance |

| Preceded by Wren Blair; Jack Gordon | Head coach of the Minnesota North Stars; 1969–70; 1975 | Succeeded by Jack Gordon; Ted Harris |
