= Jack Gordon (ice hockey) =

Canadian ice hockey player and coach (1928–2022)

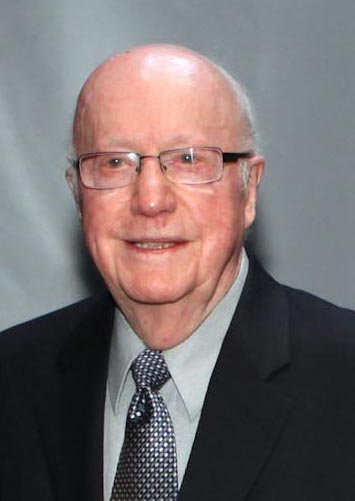
- Gordon in 2012
- Born: March 3, 1928 Winnipeg, Manitoba, Canada
- Died: June 27, 2022 (aged 94) Minnesota, U.S.
- Height: 5 ft 9 in (175 cm)
- Weight: 154 lb (70 kg; 11 st 0 lb)
- Position: Centre
- Shot: Right
- Played for: New York Rangers
- Playing career: 1946–1961

John Gordon (March 3, 1928 – June 27, 2022) was a Canadian ice hockey manager, coach, and player. Gordon played 36 games in the National Hockey League with the New York Rangers between 1949 and 1951. The rest of his playing career, which lasted from 1946 to 1961, was mainly spent with the Cleveland Barons of the American Hockey League. He was also head coach of the Minnesota North Stars from 1970 to 1973, general manager of the North Stars from 1974 to 1978, and general manager of the Vancouver Canucks from 1985 to 1987.

== AHL career ==
Although Gordon had limited playing time in the NHL, he enjoyed a productive 14-year career in the American Hockey League, where he was a consistent offensive force. He debuted at age 19 in 1947 with the New Haven Ramblers and quickly made his mark. By 1949, he tallied 60 assists and 83 points, ranking second in the league in assists. In 1951, he joined the Cincinnati Mohawks and led the team in scoring during his lone season there. He later became a key player for the Cleveland Barons over eight seasons, notably recording 102 points in 1954, second-highest in the AHL, and helping the Barons capture the Calder Cup. In 1957, he took on the role of player-coach and led the team to another Calder Cup in his first year behind the bench. Gordon retired from playing after the 1959 season but continued coaching the Barons for three more years. He returned for additional coaching stints in 1969 and 1970, following a three-year term as assistant general manager of the New York Rangers.

== Career statistics ==
=== Regular season and playoffs ===
			Regular season					Playoffs
Season	Team	League	GP	G	A	Pts	PIM	GP	G	A	Pts	PIM
1945–46	Winnipeg Rangers	MAHA	—	—	—	—	—	—	—	—	—	—
1946–47	New York Rovers	EAHL	54	37	40	77	6	7	4	5	9	0
1947–48	New Haven Ramblers	AHL	37	11	24	35	2	4	0	3	3	0
1948–49	New York Rangers	NHL	31	3	9	12	0	—	—	—	—	—
1948–49	New Haven Ramblers	AHL	36	10	28	38	14	—	—	—	—	—
1949–50	New York Rangers	NHL	1	0	0	0	0	9	1	1	2	7
1949–50	New Haven Ramblers	AHL	70	23	60	83	2	—	—	—	—	—
1950–51	New York Rangers	NHL	4	0	1	1	0	—	—	—	—	—
1950–51	Cincinnati Mohawks	AHL	59	23	42	65	10	—	—	—	—	—
1951–52	Cleveland Barons	AHL	20	7	20	27	0	2	0	2	2	0
1952–53	Cleveland Barons	AHL	64	20	58	78	6	11	4	7	11	0
1953–54	Cleveland Barons	AHL	70	31	71	102	20	9	5	13	18	4
1954–55	Cleveland Barons	AHL	57	17	50	67	22	4	1	3	4	0
1955–56	Cleveland Barons	AHL	54	26	43	69	33	6	5	4	9	2
1956–57	Cleveland Barons	AHL	33	4	14	18	0	12	2	2	4	2
1957–58	Cleveland Barons	AHL	51	6	18	24	10	6	1	2	3	2
1958–59	Cleveland Barons	AHL	38	3	5	8	0	—	—	—	—	—
1959–60	Cleveland Barons	AHL	8	0	1	1	0	—	—	—	—	—
1960–61	Cleveland Barons	AHL	5	0	0	0	0	—	—	—	—	—
AHL totals			602	181	434	615	119	54	18	36	54	10
NHL totals			36	3	10	13	0	9	1	1	2	7

=== NHL Coaching record ===
Team	Year	Regular season						Postseason
Team	Year	G	W	L	T	Pts	Finish	Result
Minnesota North Stars	1970–71	78	28	34	16	72	4th in West	Lost in semi-finals
Minnesota North Stars	1971–72	78	37	29	12	86	2nd in West	Lost in quarter-finals
Minnesota North Stars	1972–73	78	37	30	11	85	3rd in West	Lost in quarter-finals
Minnesota North Stars	1973–74	17	3	8	6	12	7th in West	Promoted to GM
Minnesota North Stars	1974–75	38	11	22	5	27	4th in Smythe	Returned to GM role
NHL Totals		289	116	123	50			

Preceded by Charlie Burns; Parker MacDonald	Head coach of the Minnesota North Stars; 1970–73; 1974–75	Succeeded by Parker MacDonald; Charlie Burns
Preceded by Wren Blair	General Manager of the Minnesota North Stars; 1974–78	Succeeded by Lou Nanne
Preceded by Harry Neale	General Manager of the Vancouver Canucks; 1985–87	Succeeded by Pat Quinn
