= Bill Mahoney =

Canadian ice hockey coach (1939–2021)

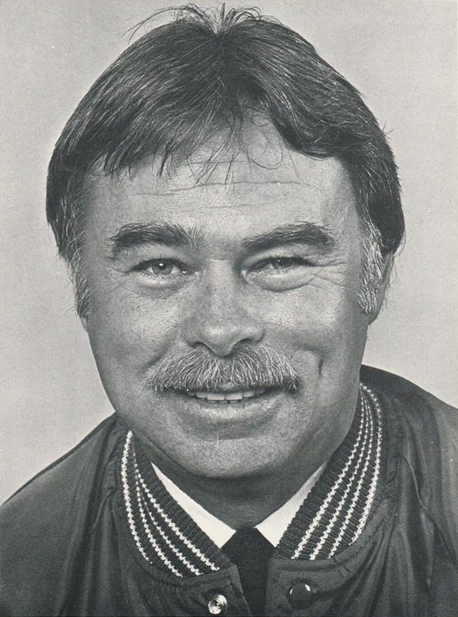
- Born: June 23, 1939 Tillsonburg, Ontario, Canada
- Died: December 16, 2021 (aged 82) London, Ontario, Canada
- Coached for: Minnesota North Stars
- Coaching career: 1983–1985

William Mahoney (June 23, 1939 – December 16, 2021) was a Canadian ice hockey coach. He was head coach of the Minnesota North Stars from 1983 to 1985.

Born in Peterborough, Ontario, he was a star multi-sport athlete. In addition to playing hockey, Mahoney was also a renowned lacrosse player, a Canadian football quarterback, and a softball pitcher. He was part of the Peterborough Shamrocks bantam "A" team, which won the 1953 provincial championship. In 1956, he became the first local native to play for the Peterborough Petes, and he served as captain of this junior "A" squad during the 1958 season. Mahoney later played university hockey at Carleton University in Ottawa and at McMaster University in Hamilton.

In 1963, Mahoney led the McMaster Marauders to become the first-ever Canadian Intercollegiate Athletic Union (CIAU) ice hockey champions, at the inaugural CIAU University Cup tournament, also winning the first ever tournament Most Valuable Player award.

Although Mahoney never played pro hockey, he had a long coaching career, serving 16 years behind the bench with the McMaster University squads. In 1980, he was hired as an assistant coach with the Washington Capitals, but he was released as part of a 1981 clearing of the coaching staff. In 1982, he became coach of the Adirondack Red Wings of the AHL before gaining his position with Minnesota of the NHL.

In 1982, Mahoney was inducted into the Peterborough and District Sports Hall of Fame, for his combined achievements in both hockey and softball. He died on December 16, 2021, from complications of dementia, at the age of 82.

== NHL Coaching record ==
Team	Year	Regular season						Post season
Team	Year	G	W	L	T	Pts	Finish	Result
Minnesota North Stars	1983–84	80	39	31	10	88	1st in Norris	Lost in Conference Finals
Minnesota North Stars	1984–85	13	3	8	2	(62)	4th in Norris	(fired)
Total		93	42	39	12			

Preceded by Murray Oliver	Head coach of the Minnesota North Stars; 1983–84	Succeeded by Glen Sonmor
