= Minnesota North Stars =

Former National Hockey League team (1967–1993)

- Founded: 1967
- History: Minnesota North Stars; 1967–1993; Dallas Stars; 1993–present
- Home arena: Met Center
- City: Bloomington, Minnesota
- Team colors: Green, gold, black, white
- Stanley Cups: 0
- Conference championships: 1 (1990–91)
- Presidents' Trophies: 0
- Division championships: 2 (1981–82, 1983–84)

The Minnesota North Stars were a professional ice hockey team in the National Hockey League (NHL) for 26 seasons, from 1967 to 1993. The North Stars played their home games at the Met Center in Bloomington, Minnesota, and the team's colors for most of its history were green, yellow, gold and white. The North Stars played 2,062 regular season games and made the NHL playoffs 17 times, including two Stanley Cup Final appearances, where they were defeated by the New York Islanders in 1981 and the Pittsburgh Penguins in 1991. After the 1992–93 season, the franchise moved to Dallas, and the team was renamed the Dallas Stars.

== History ==
=== Beginnings ===
Met Center, home ice of the Minnesota North Stars.

On March 11, 1965, NHL President Clarence Campbell announced that the league would expand to 12 teams from six by creating a new six-team division for the 1967–68 season. In response to the announcement, a partnership of nine men, led by Walter Bush, Jr., Robert Ridder, and John Driscoll, was formed to seek a franchise for the Twin Cities area of Minnesota. Their efforts were successful, as the NHL awarded one of its six expansion franchises to Minnesota on February 9, 1966. The five other franchises were awarded to Oakland, Los Angeles, Philadelphia, Pittsburgh, and St. Louis. The expansion fee for each new team was $2 million ($19.8 million in 2025 dollars). The "North Stars" name was announced on May 25, 1966, after a public contest. The name derives from the state motto, "L'Étoile du Nord", a French phrase meaning "The Star of the North". Months after the naming of the team, ground was broken on October 3, 1966, for a new hockey arena in Bloomington. The home of the North Stars, the Metropolitan Sports Center, was built in 12 months at a cost of $7 million ($69.5 million in 2025 dollars). The arena was ready for play for the start of the 1967–68 NHL season, but parts of its construction were incomplete. Spectator seats were still being installed as fans arrived for the opening home game on October 21, 1967.

=== Early years ===
On October 11, 1967, the North Stars played the first game in franchise history on the road against the St. Louis Blues, another expansion team. The game was a 2–2 tie, with former US National Team forward Bill Masterton scoring the first goal in franchise history. On October 21, 1967, the North Stars played their first home game, against the California Seals. The North Stars won 3–1. The team achieved success early, reaching first place in the West Division halfway through the 1967–68 season. Tragedy struck the team on January 13, 1968, when Masterton suffered a fatal hit during a game against the Seals at Met Center. Skating towards the Seals goal across the blue line, he fell backward, hitting the back of his head on the ice, rendering him unconscious. He never regained consciousness and died on January 15, 1968, two days after the accident. He was 29. Doctors described the cause of death as a "massive brain injury". To date, this remains the only death of a player as a result of an injury during a game in NHL history. The North Stars retired his jersey, and later that year, hockey writers established the Bill Masterton Memorial Trophy, which would be given annually to a player who best exemplifies the qualities of perseverance, sportsmanship, and dedication to hockey. Following the news of Masterton's death, the North Stars lost the next six games.

The North Stars achieved success in their first year of existence by finishing fourth in the West Division with a record of 27–32–15 and advancing to the playoffs. During the 1968 playoffs, the North Stars defeated the Los Angeles Kings in seven games after losing the first two in the series. In the next round, the West finals, the North Stars faced the St. Louis Blues in a series that also went seven games. Minnesota was one game away from advancing to the Stanley Cup Final but lost the deciding game in double overtime.

The team was led in the early years by the goaltending duo Lorne "Gump" Worsley and Cesare Maniago. Defenseman Ted Harris was the North Stars' captain. The first Stars team also included high-scoring winger Bill Goldsworthy and other quality players such as Barry Gibbs, Jude Drouin, J. P. Parise, Danny Grant, Lou Nanne, Tom Reid and Dennis Hextall.

The World Hockey Association (WHA) began play in 1972 with a franchise based in St. Paul, the Minnesota Fighting Saints. While a number of exhibition games were played between teams in the two leagues, the North Stars never played their cross-town rivals. But the competition for the hockey dollar between these two clubs was fierce. Despite making a good account of themselves on the ice, insurmountable financial difficulties forced the Fighting Saints to fold midway through their fourth season. A second incarnation of the Fighting Saints lasted only half of the next season before also folding.

By 1978 the North Stars had missed the playoffs in five of the previous six seasons, and had only tallied two winning seasons since joining the league. Attendance had tailed off so rapidly that the league feared that the franchise was on the verge of folding. At this point, Gordon and George Gund III, owners of the equally strapped Cleveland Barons, stepped in with an unprecedented solution—merging the North Stars with the Barons. The merged team retained the North Stars name, colors, and history, and remained in Minnesota. But the wealthier Gunds became majority owners of the merged team, and the North Stars moved from the then five-team Smythe Division to the Barons' place in the Adams Division (which would otherwise have been left with only three teams) for the 1978–79 season. The recently retired Nanne was named general manager, and some of the Barons players – notably goaltender Gilles Meloche and forwards Al MacAdam and Mike Fidler – bolstered Minnesota's lineup. Furthermore, Minnesota had drafted Bobby Smith, who went on to win the Calder Memorial Trophy as the NHL's top rookie that year, and Steve Payne, who recorded 42 goals in his second campaign in 1979–80.

On January 15, 1979, the North Stars defeated the New York Rangers at Madison Square Garden, 8–1. Tim Young became the second player in NHL history to score five goals on five shots. His five-goal game remains the best offensive output by a player in the Minnesota/Dallas franchise.

=== 1980s ===
In the middle of this transition, a historic night awaited the North Stars. On January 7, 1980, Minnesota was scheduled to play the Philadelphia Flyers, who came to Bloomington with the NHL's and major league sports’ longest undefeated streak, a 35-game run of 25 wins and 10 ties. An all-time record Met Center crowd of 15,962 squeezed into the arena, which remained the highest total in all 26 seasons of the North Stars franchise. Minnesota ended the Flyers' streak with a 7–1 win. Seven different North Stars scored seven unanswered goals. In the quarterfinals of the 1980 playoffs, the North Stars upset the four-time defending champion Montreal Canadiens in seven games before bowing out to Philadelphia in the next round.

With the addition of new players such as Minnesota native and 1980 Olympian Neal Broten and sniper Dino Ciccarelli, the North Stars had five straight winning seasons starting in 1979–80, which included back-to-back trips to the Stanley Cup semifinals, against the Flyers in 1980 and against the Calgary Flames in 1981. By defeating the Flames in 1981, the North Stars reached their first Stanley Cup Final. They lost in five games to the heavily favored New York Islanders.

On November 11, 1981, the Winnipeg Jets visited Met Center. Fueled by an eight-goal second period, and a four-goal, seven-point night by Bobby Smith, the North Stars scored the most goals in an NHL game since 1944 in a 15–2 win.

Following the 1981 NHL realignment to a more geographically grouped configuration, the North Stars were in the Norris Division. Ciccarelli scored a franchise record 55 goals in just his second season in 1981–82, leading Minnesota to its first division title. The team bowed out of the playoffs in the first round against the Chicago Black Hawks.

In the summer of 1982, general manager Lou Nanne drafted Brian Bellows, who scored 35 goals in his rookie season of 1982–83, when the team finished with 40 wins and 96 regular season points – both the most ever recorded in the 26 years the franchise was based in Minnesota. The North Stars lost in the playoffs to the Chicago Black Hawks in the second round.

In 1983–84 Bill Mahoney, a defensive-minded coach, took over. Early in the season, Bobby Smith was traded to the Montreal Canadiens for a pair of defense-minded forwards, Keith Acton and Mark Napier. The team posted the second-highest victory total in its history with 39 and won its second Norris Division crown in three years. Luckily for them, the Norris Division was very weak that year; they were the only team in the division to have a winning record.

In the playoffs, the North Stars defeated the Blackhawks. Minnesota won the series 3–2, then eliminated the St. Louis Blues in seven games. They then lost to the Edmonton Oilers in four games.

After 1984, the franchise only had one more winning season in Minnesota, in 1985–86. In 1987–88, it won 19 games, the second-fewest wins in franchise history. A loss to the Calgary Flames coupled with the Leafs' win over the Red Wings not only kept the North Stars out of the playoffs, but also with the worst record in the league. Chronic attendance problems led the owners to threaten to move the club to the San Francisco Bay Area, against the league's wishes.

=== 1990s ===
The NHL instituted a compromise for the 1990–91 season whereby the Gund brothers were awarded an expansion team in the Bay Area, the San Jose Sharks, that would receive players from Minnesota via a dispersal draft with the North Stars. Both the Sharks and North Stars would then be able to select players from the other 20 NHL teams in an expansion draft. A group previously petitioning for an NHL team in the Bay Area, led by Howard Baldwin and Morris Belzberg, bought the North Stars as part of the deal. Baldwin and Belzberg purchased the team from the Gunds for approximately $38.1 million (including $1 million in liabilities as well as giving the Gunds their share of the fees from the next three expansion teams, expected to be $7.14 million). Norman Green, a former part-owner of the Calgary Flames and a last-minute newcomer to Baldwin and Belzberg's group, purchased 51% controlling interest in the North Stars from them, with Baldwin and Belzberg sharing the remaining 49% stake. Green agreed to purchase Baldwin's 24.5% share, giving him more than 75% control of the team shortly after a dispute with Baldwin arose. Belzberg maintained his share of the rest of the team's stock until October 1990, when Green became the team's sole owner by buying Belzberg's shares.

In the 1990–91 season, despite a losing record in the regular season, the North Stars embarked on a Cinderella run to the Stanley Cup Final. They knocked off the Chicago Blackhawks and St. Louis Blues (the top two teams in the NHL during the regular season) in six games each and the defending Stanley Cup champion Edmonton Oilers in five games, making it to the finals for the second time in franchise history. The team fought hard against the eventual champion Pittsburgh Penguins, led by Mario Lemieux. They won two out of the first three contests before being obliterated 8–0 in game six of the best-of-seven series. It was the most lopsided defeat in a deciding game of the Stanley Cup Final since the original Ottawa Senators defeated the Dawson City Nuggets 23–2 in 1905.

Following the 1991 Finals run, the North Stars adopted a new logo – the word "STARS" in italicized gold capitals over a green star with a gold outline; the gold now a more metallic shade than the previous yellowish shade. The team also adopted black as its primary color for its road uniforms, and eliminated gold from the uniform, except for the logo. Even before the logo change, it had been speculated that the North Stars would adopt a new logo following the 1990–91 season, as the future primary logo was first painted on the Met Center ice before the aforementioned season, albeit in a reverse color scheme from its upcoming incarnation.

To celebrate the team's 25th anniversary, the team wore a commemorative patch on the left shoulder of its uniforms. The patch depicted Bill Goldsworthy, wearing a green uniform, facing off against Mike Modano, wearing the new black uniform.

Per the 1991 expansion agreement, the North Stars were allowed to protect fourteen players from selection by the Sharks. This meant the core of their 1991 conference championship roster essentially remained intact, with the team losing only four players from its NHL roster to San Jose (the Sharks' remaining selections from Minnesota were minor-leaguers). As a result, while the Sharks endured the typical struggles of an expansion team and finished last overall, the North Stars modestly improved from the 1990–91 regular season though still finishing with a losing record. They made the 1992 playoffs and took a 3–2 series lead into game six at the Met Center against the Norris Division champion Detroit Red Wings. The Red Wings won, 1–0, in overtime after a video referee review confirmed that Sergei Fedorov had scored a goal. This was the first use of video replay in the Stanley Cup playoffs. The Wings won the seventh game at home, 5–2.

=== Relocation to Dallas ===
By 1992, Green was arranging a deal to move the team to Southern California as the Los Angeles Stars, playing at a new arena (which is now the Honda Center) under construction in Anaheim. However, by then The Walt Disney Company was already in negotiations with the NHL to acquire an expansion team in the area. The league instead asked Green to cede the market to a Disney-owned expansion franchise (what became the Mighty Ducks of Anaheim). In return, Green would be free to move the North Stars to any other city of Green's choosing. In January 1993, Green chose Dallas, Texas as the new home of the franchise, and the decision was formally announced on March 10. Several reasons were cited for the relocation, including poor attendance during a string of losing seasons, the failure to reach deals for a new arena in either Minneapolis or Saint Paul, and a sexual harassment lawsuit against Green that resulted in his wife threatening to leave him unless he moved the team. The subsequent decision to relocate the franchise to Texas made Green much reviled in Minnesota, where he derisively came to be known as "Norm Greed".

Another factor that also precipitated the move to Dallas was that the team refused to play at the Target Center, where the NBA's Minnesota Timberwolves played, due to the fact that Coca-Cola had advertising and pouring rights at that arena. The North Stars and the Met Center had Pepsi as their sponsor. Despite that, the newly relocated Stars did play at Target Center on December 9, 1993, against the Ottawa Senators, though only 14,058 fans showed up to watch the Stars defeat the Senators 6–1.

Due to mounting financial problems resulting from poor management of his non-hockey business ventures, Green only kept the Stars for three more years before selling them to Tom Hicks in 1996.

On the other hand, the Dallas franchise has taken some steps to mend the emotional wounds left in Minnesota. When the Dallas Stars won the 1999 Stanley Cup–three years after Green sold the team–their official video "Nothing Else Matters" not only included their past seasons' disappointments, but also paid tribute to the North Stars' 1991 run to the final, of which star Mike Modano and general manager Bob Gainey had been a part of.

Modano, who retired in 2011, was the last former North Star in the NHL, leaving the Stars franchise after the 2009–10 season. After Modano's last game as a Dallas Star, which was in Minnesota playing the Wild (an NHL expansion team - see below), Modano came on the ice as the first star wearing a North Stars jersey, getting a standing ovation from the crowd. The last active former North Star was Mike Craig, who played in Italy until 2013.

With the departure of former North Stars scout Les Jackson from the Dallas Stars franchise on June 30, 2020, there is no longer anyone working for Dallas who had a direct connection to the franchise's time in Minnesota.

=== Return of NHL hockey to Minnesota ===
NHL hockey returned to Minnesota when the NHL announced in 1997 that the state had been awarded an expansion franchise to begin play in the 2000–01 NHL season. In 1998, the team name for the new franchise became the Minnesota Wild.

On December 17, 2000, the Wild hosted the Dallas Stars in the latter's first visit to Minnesota since the relocation (excluding the aforementioned neutral-site game at Target Center in 1993). The Wild won that game 6–0 with Darby Hendrickson scoring two goals and Manny Fernandez making 24 saves for a shutout. As of the 2025–26 season, the Stars won 56 of 98 meetings with the Wild, with one tie and twelve overtime/shootout (OT/SO) losses. The two teams also faced each other in the 2016, 2023 and 2026 first round of the Stanley Cup playoffs. The Stars won the first two series before the Wild won its most recent.

On April 4, 2017, the Wild honored the North Stars by wearing North Stars jerseys for warmups, despite the North Stars history belonging to the Dallas Stars. Martin Hanzal warmed up with number 91, as the North Stars retired number 19 in honor of Bill Masterton. Zach Parise also warmed up with equipment belonging to his father, the late Jean-Paul Parise, who played for the North Stars.

An alumni game between the Chicago Blackhawks and team Minnesota took place the day prior to the 2016 Stadium Series with team Minnesota winning 6–4. Team Minnesota featured a mix of former North Stars and Wild players, and wore throwback North Stars jerseys with the former's logo on the right shoulder and the Wild logo on the left shoulder.

For the 2020–21 season, the Minnesota Wild introduced a version of the 1978 North Stars jersey, featuring a recolored Wild logo as part of the league-wide "Reverse Retro" jersey program. In the 2022–23 season, a green version of the "Reverse Retro" jersey was used. The Wild's green "Reverse Retro" jersey was subsequently promoted to a full-time third jersey as "The 78s" alternate uniform, adding the recolored "State of Hockey" patch on the shoulders.

== Logos and colors ==
The original North Stars logo, used until 1985.

The North Stars logo used for the 1991–92 and 1992–93 seasons, before the move to Dallas. Dallas adopted a similar logo until 2013.

The North Stars were known for their "classic" green and gold color scheme. For the majority of their existence, the North Stars wore white jerseys with green and gold striping at home and green jerseys with white and gold stripes on the road. Black trim was added to the white jerseys in 1981, and to the green jerseys in 1988. In 1988–89, the pants changed from green to black, with three stars on each side in place of stripes.

In 1991, black became the primary color, as the team underwent a complete redesign. The new logo and uniforms were carried over to Dallas after the team moved south.

== Season-by-season record ==
The team had a 758–970–334 regular season record, and a 77–82 playoff record with two Norris Division championships, and one Campbell Conference championship.

== Players and personnel ==
=== Retired numbers ===
Minnesota North Stars retired numbers
No.	Player	Position	Career	Date of retirement
8	Bill Goldsworthy	RW	1967–1977	February 15, 1992
19	Bill Masterton	C	1967–1968	January 17, 1987

These numbers remain retired with the Dallas Stars. In addition to Goldsworthy and Masterton, the Stars have retired the number 7 of Neal Broten, who played with the North Stars from 1981 to 1993, and the number 9 of Mike Modano who played from 1988 to 1993.

=== Hockey Hall of Fame ===
Players

- Leo Boivin
- Dino Ciccarelli
- Mike Gartner
- Mike Modano
- Larry Murphy
- Gump Worsley

=== First-round draft picks ===
- 1967: Wayne Cheesman (fourth overall)
- 1968: Jim Benzelock (fifth overall)
- 1969: Dick Redmond (fifth overall)
- 1972: Jerry Byers (12th overall)
- 1974: Doug Hicks (sixth overall)
- 1975: Bryan Maxwell (fourth overall)
- 1976: Glen Sharpley (third overall)
- 1977: Brad Maxwell (seventh overall)
- 1978: Bobby Smith (first overall)
- 1979: Craig Hartsburg (sixth overall) and Tom McCarthy (10th overall)
- 1980: Brad Palmer (16th overall)
- 1981: Ron Meighan (13th overall)
- 1982: Brian Bellows (second overall)
- 1983: Brian Lawton (first overall)
- 1984: David Quinn (13th overall)
- 1986: Warren Babe (12th overall)
- 1987: Dave Archibald (sixth overall)
- 1988: Mike Modano (first overall)
- 1989: Doug Zmolek (seventh overall)
- 1990: Derian Hatcher (eighth overall)
- 1991: Richard Matvichuk (eighth overall)

=== Team captains ===
Note: This list does not include Dallas Stars, California Golden Seals and Cleveland Barons captains.

- Bob Woytowich 1967–1968
- Elmer Vasko 1968–1969
- Claude Larose 1969–1970
- Ted Harris 1970–1974
- Bill Goldsworthy 1974–1976
- Bill Hogaboam 1976–1977
- Nick Beverley 1977–1978
- J. P. Parise 1978–1979
- Paul Shmyr 1979–1981
- Tim Young 1981–1982
- Craig Hartsburg 1982–1989
- Brian Bellows 1984 (interim)
- Curt Giles 1989–1991
- Mark Tinordi 1991–1993

=== Head coaches ===
- Wren Blair, 1967–1970
- John Muckler, 1968–1969
- Charlie Burns, 1969–1970, 1974–1975
- Jack Gordon, 1970–1975
- Parker MacDonald, 1973–1974
- Ted Harris, 1975–1978
- Andre Beaulieu, 1977–1978
- Lou Nanne, 1977–1978
- Harry Howell, 1978–1979
- Glen Sonmor, 1978–1987
- Murray Oliver, 1982–1983
- Bill Mahoney, 1983–1985
- Lorne Henning, 1985–1987
- Herb Brooks, 1987–1988
- Pierre Page, 1988–1990
- Bob Gainey, 1990–1993

== NHL awards and trophies ==
Clarence S. Campbell Bowl

- 1990–91

Calder Memorial Trophy

- Danny Grant: 1968–69
- Bobby Smith: 1978–79

Bill Masterton Memorial Trophy

- Al MacAdam: 1979–80

== Franchise leaders and records ==
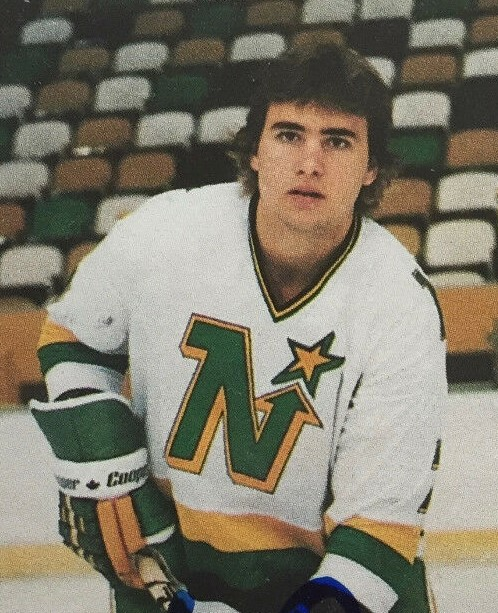
Neal Broten is the all-time points leader in Minnesota North Stars history

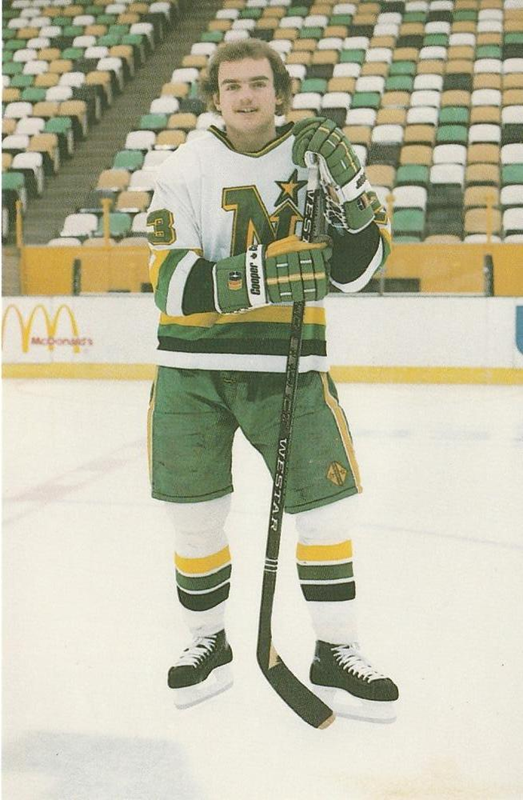
Brian Bellows is the all-time goals leader in North Stars history

=== Franchise scoring leaders ===
This is a listing of the top ten point scorers in franchise history.

Note: Pos = Position; GP = Games played; G = Goals; A = Assists; Pts = Points; P/G = Points per game

Points
Player	Pos	GP	G	A	Pts	+/−	PIM
Neal Broten	C	876	249	547	796	15	457
Brian Bellows	LW	753	342	380	722	−82	537
Dino Ciccarelli	RW	602	332	319	651	−2	642
Bobby Smith	C	572	185	369	554	−43	487
Bill Goldsworthy	RW	670	267	239	506	−86	711
Tim Young	C	565	178	316	494	−71	401
Steve Payne	LW	613	228	238	466	31	435
Craig Hartsburg	D	570	98	315	413	−6	815
Dave Gagner	C	440	187	217	404	−10	577
J. P. Parise	LW	588	154	242	396	−85	509

=== Franchise records ===
Regular season

- Games played: Neal Broten, 876
- Goals: Brian Bellows, 342
- Assists: Neal Broten, 547
- Points: Neal Broten, 796
- Penalty minutes: Basil McRae, 1,567
- Games: Cesare Maniago, 420
- Wins: Cesare Maniago, 145
- Shutouts: Cesare Maniago, 26

Single season

- Goals: Dino Ciccarelli (1981–82) and Brian Bellows (1989-90), 55
- Assists: Neal Broten, 76 (1985–86)
- Points: Bobby Smith, 114 (1981–82)
- Penalty minutes: Basil McRae, 382 (1987–88)
- Wins: Jon Casey, 31 (1989–90)
- Shutouts: Cesare Maniago, 6 (1967–68)

Playoffs

- Games played: Neal Broten, 104
- Goals: Steve Payne, 35
- Assists: Bobby Smith, 50
- Points: Brian Bellows, 83
- Penalty minutes: Willi Plett, 201
- Games: Gilles Meloche, 45
- Wins: Gilles Meloche and Jon Casey, 21
- Shutouts: Cesare Maniago, 3

== Broadcasting ==
WTCN-TV Channel 11 (now KARE) carried North Stars games from 1967 to 1979. Usually, 27 road games and three home games were televised each season. Frank Buetel was the play-by-play announcer from 1967 to 1970. Hal Kelly took over for the next few years, followed by Joe Boyle in the mid-1970s. Boyle was joined by color commentator Roger Buxton. After the station gained NBC affiliation in 1979, telecasts moved to KMSP-TV (now a Fox owned-and-operated station), with most called by Bob Kurtz and retired North Stars defenseman Tom Reid (incidentally, Kurtz and Reid are the Minnesota Wild's current radio announce team). KITN (now WFTC) televised North Stars games with Frank Mazzocco on play-by-play with color commentators Fred Barrett, Roger Buxton, and Wally Shaver from the 1984–85 through 1986–87 seasons. The 1987–88 season saw North Stars' games telecast over Saint Cloud-based UHF station KXLI (with Kurtz on play-by-play and former Islander goalie Glenn "Chico" Resch on color). Doug McLeod succeeded Kurtz on play-by-play the following season. The North Stars' telecasts returned to KMSP in December 1988. The majority of the road games continued to be shown on KMSP, though late in the season some road games were shown on the premium channel Midwest Sports Channel. For the 1989–90 season, Tom Reid joined McLeod in the booth, replacing Resch as color commentator. The 1990–91 season saw first Lou Nanne, then Dave Maloney, and then again, for the playoffs, Nanne paired with McLeod for television broadcasts on both of these same channels. Telecasts were almost exclusively of North Stars' road games, although a handful of home games were televised during that period of time. The 1991 Stanley Cup Final run saw home games available only on pay-per-view and not available to most hockey fans in Minnesota. Dave Hodge handled TV play-by-play, partnering with color analyst Joe Micheletti in the 1991–92 season.

North Stars radio broadcasts originated from WCCO Radio from 1967 to 1978, then moved to another Twin Cities-based clear-channel station, KSTP, where radio broadcasts stayed until the team moved to Dallas in 1993, save a few seasons on a 5,000-watt radio station, WAYL. Al Shaver was the play-by-play radio announcer throughout the Stars' stay in Minnesota. During the WCCO era, Shaver was joined for many home games by WCCO's Larry Jagoe in the early seasons, followed by WCCO personality Steve Cannon. Shaver's partners on KSTP were Russ Small, Ted Robinson, and (during the last three seasons) former Dallas Stars announcer Ralph Strangis. During the Stars' final season (1992–93), Shaver and Strangis called games on KMSP, while the Stars' cable TV game announcer, Doug McLeod, called games over KSTP and the Stars' radio network. Dan Stoneking covered the North Stars on KSTP, hosting a sports talk show, and was described by team general manager Lou Nanne as an "honorary teammate" subjected to player pranks.

Shaver is a ten-time Minnesota Sportscaster of the Year and, as the 1993 Foster Hewitt Memorial Award-winner, a member of the Hockey Hall of Fame. Following the team's departure to Dallas, he called University of Minnesota Golden Gophers hockey games until his retirement in 1996.

It was on the night of the Stars' final game at Joe Louis Arena versus the Detroit Red Wings that Shaver first shared the broadcast booth with his son, Wally, who is the current Gopher hockey radio announcer. The elder Shaver's call of the closing moments of the last-ever North Stars game went thus:

"It's Ludwig, giving it to Dahlen ... 4, 3, 2, 1 ... and it's all over. The Stars lose it here, 5–3, and now it's pack-'em up time and on to Dallas. We wish them good luck. And to all the North Stars over the past 26 years, we say thank you, all of you, for so much fine entertainment. It's been a pleasure knowing you, Minnesota's loss is definitely a gain for Dallas – and a big one. We thank you, though, from the bottoms of our hearts, for all the wonderful nights at Met Center, when you've given us so much entertainment and you've been such a credit to the community in which you played. We will still remember you as the Minnesota North Stars. Good night, everybody. And goodbye."

=== Radio ===
Play-by-play

- Al Shaver, 1967–1992
- Doug McLeod, 1992–1993

Color commentators

- Larry Jagoe, 1967–1971
- Paul Giel, 1971–1972
- Steve Cannon, 1972–1978
- Tom Reid, 1978–1980
- Ted Robinson, 1980–1982
- Russ Small, 1982–1984
- Tom Reid, 1984–1989
- Bill Goldsworthy, 1989–1990
- Ralph Strangis, 1990–1992
- Doug Woog, 1992–1993 (select games)
- Tom Vannelli, 1992–1993 (select games)
- Wally Shaver, 1992–1993 (select games)

Al Shaver did all radio play-by-play except in 1992–93, when he did radio play-by-play on non televised games. He also missed some games when he did the high school hockey tournament in a number of years. Shaver's replacements were Bob Kurtz (1979–80), Ted Robinson (1980–81 and 1981–82), Frank Mazzocco (1986–87), Ralph Strangis (1990–91). In 1992–93, Doug McLeod did radio play-by-play on televised games with various analysts including Doug Woog, Tom Vannelli, and Wally Shaver.

Shaver did not follow the North Stars when they moved to Dallas in 1993, opting to stay in the Twin Cities. He called University of Minnesota men's hockey for several seasons, then retired in 1996. Shaver came out of retirement for one season in 2000, when the NHL returned to Minnesota with the debut of the Minnesota Wild, calling their games during their inaugural season in 2000–01.

After retiring as a player, Reid spent 12 years as color commentator for the North Stars. After the team's move to Dallas, Reid continued as an analyst for NCAA hockey. He and Bob Kurtz have been part of the radio broadcast team for the Minnesota Wild since the team's inaugural season in 2000.

Although Strangis had a great deal of broadcast experience, his tryout as color commentator on the Minnesota North Stars radio network was a longshot; other better-known sportscasters received more air time during the auditioning process. The five potential candidates split up a game as guest commentators alongside Al Shaver, then voice of the Minnesota North Stars. The two better-known talents each took a period and then the three longshots split up the third, with Strangis going last. When Al Shaver was asked who he liked the best, he chose Strangis. Ralph shone in his audition, with the perfect ability to complement Shaver's play-by-play with insights from the players and his own intimate knowledge of the game. When the Stars moved to Dallas in 1993, Shaver decided not to migrate south with the franchise and retired. After three more seasons as color commentator (teaming with Mike Fornes), Strangis migrated to the play-by-play mic, effectively cementing his status as the "Voice of the Stars."

=== Television ===
Play-by-play

- Frank Buetel, 1967–1970
- Hal Kelly, 1970–1973
- Joe Boyle, 1973–1979
- Bob Kurtz, 1979–1984
- Frank Mazzocco, 1984–1987
- Doug McLeod, 1987–1991
- Dave Hodge, 1991–1992
- Al Shaver, 1992–1993

Color commentators

- Norm Aldred and Bob May, 1967–68
- Ed Harringan, 1968–69
- Joe Boyle, 1970–1973
- Roger Buxton, 1973–1979
- Dave Sheehan, 1979–1980
- Tom Reid, 1980–1984
- Fred Barrett and Roger Buxton, 1984–1985
- Wally Shaver, 1985–1987
- Chico Resch, 1987–1989
- Tom Reid, 1989–90
- Lou Nanne, 1990–1991 (select games)
- Dave Maloney, 1990–1991 (select games)
- Joe Micheletti, 1991–1992
- Ralph Strangis, 1992–1993

In 1979, Kurtz joined KMSP-TV, where he called Minnesota Twins games from 1979 to 1986 and Minnesota North Stars games from 1979 to 1984. He was also the North Stars play by play announcer on KXLI-TV during the 1987–88 NHL season. From 1988 to 1989, he was the sports director at KSTP radio, where he also called University of Minnesota hockey, football and basketball. Kurtz returned to Minnesota in 2000 when he was hired to become the first radio play by play announcer for the Minnesota Wild. He was reunited with Tom Reid, who he previously worked with while calling games for the North Stars as well as University of Minnesota and Michigan State hockey broadcasts.

== See also ==
- List of Minnesota North Stars players
- List of Minnesota North Stars draft picks
- Dallas Stars
- Minnesota Wild
- California Seals
- Cleveland Barons
- List of defunct NHL teams
- 1967 NHL expansion
