= Steve Cannon (radio) =

American talk radio host

Steve Bernard Cannon (1927–2009) was an American radio personality who spent 1964-1971 broadcasting from KSTP-AM, then a longer stretch hosting a drive time talk show in Minneapolis-St. Paul, Minnesota, the Cannon Mess, on WCCO Radio - 830 AM from 3pm-6pm and 3pm-7pm. from "the basement studio."

Both on KSTP and WCCO Cannon had a regular cast of self-voiced characters known as his "Lil Cannons" that included Ma Linger, Backlash Larue and Morgan Mundane (not to mention Contemporary Collins) through which he provided comedic relief as well as commentary on the topics of the day. He often made jokes about what he called "the crack management staff at 'CCO".

Cannon spent 26 years at WCCO, before he retired in 1997. He was inducted into the Pavek Museum of Broadcasting Hall of Fame in 2002. Early in his broadcast career Cannon was a TV host as children's show character "Wrangler Steve" on WMIN-TV 11 and later during newscasts on KSTP 5. Previous to WCCO, he had been heard in Minneapolis-St. Paul on KSTP-AM and WLOL, and in San Francisco on KGO.

== Death ==
Steve Cannon died, aged 81, on April 6, 2009, from cancer.
