= Lou Nanne =

Canadian-born American ice hockey player and general manager

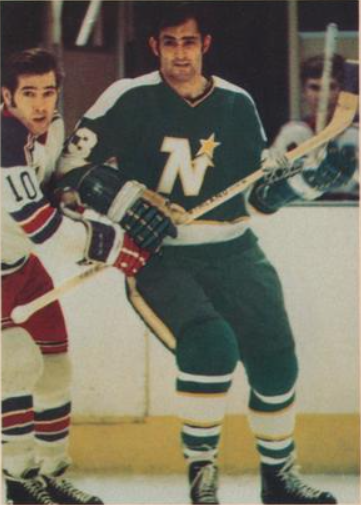
- Nanne in 1971
- Born: June 2, 1941 (age 85) Sault Ste. Marie, Ontario, Canada
- Height: 6 ft 0 in (183 cm)
- Weight: 180 lb (82 kg; 12 st 12 lb)
- Position: Defense/Right Wing
- Shot: Right
- Played for: Minnesota North Stars
- National team: United States
- Playing career: 1963–1978

Louis Vincent Anthony Nanne (/ˈnæniː/ NAN-ee; born June 2, 1941) is a Canadian-born American former National Hockey League (NHL) defenceman and general manager. He played in the NHL with the Minnesota North Stars between 1968 and 1978 and then served as the general manager of the team from 1978 to 1988. He also coached the team briefly during the 1978–79 season. Internationally Nanne played for the American national team at the 1968 Winter Olympics and the 1976 and 1977 World Championships, as well as 1976 Canada Cup, and managed the American teams at the 1981, 1984, and 1987 Canada Cup. He is a member of the United States Hockey Hall of Fame and of the International Ice Hockey Federation Hall of Fame.

== Early life ==
Nanne grew up in Ontario where he played hockey with Phil and Tony Esposito. In 1960, he enrolled at the University of Minnesota to play hockey for the Minnesota Gophers while studying business administration. At Minnesota, he would be coached by the legendary John Mariucci and become one of American college hockey's biggest stars during the 1960s. He is still the only defenseman to win the WCHA scoring title he accomplished in the 1962–63 season. In 1967, Nanne became an American citizen which allowed him to play for and captain the U.S. national team, alongside future Miracle on Ice coach Herb Brooks, which finished 6th at the 1968 Winter Olympics in Grenoble, France.

== Playing career ==
Lou Nanne turned down a $8000 contract offer from the National Hockey League's Chicago Blackhawks in 1963 after graduating from university, noting that he made three times as much money in his current job working as a salesman for Harvey Mackay's envelope manufacturing company. Nanne finally started his National Hockey League career in 1968 following the Olympics. He would spend his entire career in Minnesota after signing a free agent contract with the expansion Minnesota North Stars who had acquired his rights from the Blackhawks. He played 635 NHL regular season games for the North Stars through the 1977–78 season. A steady defenseman and sometime forward, he scored 21 goals in 1971–72, but was mostly known for his defensive, penalty-killing abilities. Nanne played for American national team in 1976 and 1977, and the inaugural 1976 Canada Cup. Nanne also served as national team captain or alternate in both years.

Nanne also played minor pro league hockey for the Rochester Mustangs and Cleveland Barons.

== Post-playing career ==
After retiring Nanne became the general manager and coach of the North Stars. With an infusion of notable players from the merger with the Cleveland Barons and through the draft, he quickly rebuilt the North Stars into a contender after his playing career ended in 1978. The Stars reached the Stanley Cup Final in 1981, the conference final in 1984, and made the playoffs seven consecutive seasons (1979–1986). This winning run saw the North Stars average over 35 wins per season, encompassing the North Stars sole 40-win season, and six of the organization's ten 35-plus-win seasons. In 1988, after two seasons in which the North Stars finished below .500 and had consecutive fifth-place finishes in the Norris Division, Nanne resigned from the North Stars citing health reasons, and left the organization entirely in 1991. Nanne also served as general manager of the U.S. national team in the 1981, 1984, and 1987 Canada Cup tournaments.

CBS Sports and NHL Network enlisted his services to provide color commentary of their hockey telecast when the Minnesota North Stars were not involved. In 1979, he called game two of the 1979 Challenge Cup and Stanley Cup playoff games on NHL Network alongside play-by-play man Dan Kelly.

Starting in 2019, he served as the rotating color commentator for Minnesota Wild broadcasts on Bally Sports North, alternating in that role with Wes Walz and Ryan Carter.

In March 2024, Nanne retired from the microphone at the age of 82, but continues to work as a senior managing director for RBC.

== Influence on the "Miracle on Ice" ==
Nanne, along with USA Hockey's Walter Bush, spearheaded the campaign to have Herb Brooks named head coach of the U.S. Olympic Hockey Team leading up to the 1980 Winter Games. Nanne, who had just been named the General Manager of the North Stars, offered Brooks, who was then the head coach at the University of Minnesota, the North Stars' head coaching job. Still, Brooks declined, saying that it was instead his goal to coach the Olympic team. After legendary Boston University coach Jack Parker turned down the head coach position of Team USA, Nanne, and Bush became involved in the Olympic Team selection process and pushed for Brooks to be named coach. Brooks did later coach under Nanne in Minnesota during the 1987–88 season, but was fired following a 19–48–13 season.

== Personal life ==
Nanne had been the TV color commentator for the Minnesota State High School Boys Hockey tournament since 1964, a total of 60 years. His last year calling the tournament was in 2024. Nanne opened "Lou Nanne's Steakhouse" in Edina, Minnesota in March 2016. It has since been renamed Tavern23 as a tribute to Nanne's jersey number.

His son Marty Nanne, was selected by the Chicago Blackhawks in the eighth round of the 1986 NHL entry draft. Nanne's grandson Vinni Lettieri plays in the NHL, and his other grandson Louis Nanne was drafted in the 7th-round of the 2012 NHL entry draft by the Minnesota Wild.

== Career statistics ==
=== Regular season and playoffs ===
			Regular season					Playoffs
Season	Team	League	GP	G	A	Pts	PIM	GP	G	A	Pts	PIM
1960–61	University of Minnesota	WCHA	30	4	12	16	52	—	—	—	—	—
1961–62	University of Minnesota	WCHA	22	4	11	15	37	—	—	—	—	—
1962–63	University of Minnesota	WCHA	29	14	29	43	30	—	—	—	—	—
1962–63	Rochester Mustangs	USHL	—	—	—	—	—	—	—	—	—	—
1963–64	Rochester Mustangs	USHL	—	—	—	—	—	—	—	—	—	—
1964–65	Rochester Mustangs	USHL	—	14	21	35	—	—	—	—	—	—
1965–66	Rochester Mustangs	USHL	24	23	22	45	4	—	—	—	—	—
1966–67	Rochester Mustangs	USHL	24	11	12	23	8	—	—	—	—	—
1967–68	United States National Team	Intl	—	—	—	—	—	—	—	—	—	—
1967–68	Minnesota North Stars	NHL	2	0	1	1	0	—	—	—	—	—
1968–69	Minnesota North Stars	NHL	41	2	14	47	—	—	—	—	—
1968–69	Cleveland Barons	AHL	10	1	2	3	8	—	—	—	—	—
1968–69	Memphis South Stars	CHL	3	0	1	1	0	—	—	—	—	—
1969–70	Minnesota North Stars	NHL	74	3	20	23	75	5	0	2	2	2
1970–71	Minnesota North Stars	NHL	68	5	11	16	22	12	3	6	9	4
1971–72	Minnesota North Stars	NHL	78	21	28	49	27	7	0	0	0	0
1972–73	Minnesota North Stars	NHL	74	15	20	35	39	6	1	2	3	0
1973–74	Minnesota North Stars	NHL	76	11	21	32	46	—	—	—	—	—
1974–75	Minnesota North Stars	NHL	49	6	9	15	35	—	—	—	—	—
1975–76	Minnesota North Stars	NHL	79	3	14	17	45	—	—	—	—	—
1976–77	Minnesota North Stars	NHL	68	2	20	22	12	2	0	0	0	2
1977–78	Minnesota North Stars	NHL	26	0	1	1	8	—	—	—	—	—
NHL totals			635	68	157	225	356	32	4	10	14	8

=== International ===
Year	Team	Event	GP	G	A	Pts	PIM
1968	United States	OLY	7	2	2	4	12
1976	United States	WC	10	1	3	4	26
1976	United States	CC	5	0	2	2	6
1977	United States	WC	10	2	2	4	19
Senior totals			32	5	9	14	63

== Coaching record ==
Team	Year	Regular season						Postseason
Team	Year	G	W	L	T	Pts	Finish	Result
Minnesota North Stars	1977–78	29	7	18	4	18	5th in Smythe	Missed playoffs

== Awards and honors ==
Award	Year
All-WCHA First Team	1962–63
AHCA West All-American	1962–63

- WCHA Most Valuable Player (1963)
- Lester Patrick Trophy (1989)
- University of Minnesota Sports Hall of Fame (1994)
- United States Hockey Hall of Fame (1998)
- Inducted into the IIHF Hall of Fame in 2004
- National Italian American Sports Hall of Fame (2022–23)
- Minnesota Sports Hall of Fame (2023)
- Minnesota Broadcasters Hall of Fame (2025)

Awards and achievements
Preceded by Red Berenson	WCHA Most Valuable Player; 1962–63	Succeeded by Gerry Kell
Sporting positions
Preceded by Andre Beaulieu	Head coach of the Minnesota North Stars; 1978	Succeeded by Harry Howell
Preceded by Jack Gordon	General manager of the Minnesota North Stars; 1978–88	Succeeded by Jack Ferreira
Preceded by Eddie Giacomin	NHL Network/USA Network guest color commentator 1978–1980	Succeeded by Jim Craig
Preceded by Bill Chadwick	American network television color commentator 1980	Succeeded by Mickey Redmond and Gary Dornhoefer
Preceded by Mike Greenlay	Minnesota Wild color commentator 2019–present	Succeeded by Ryan Carter and Wes Walz
