= 1970–71 NHL season =

National Hockey League season

- League: National Hockey League
- Sport: Ice hockey
- Duration: October 9, 1970 – May 18, 1971
- Games: 78
- Teams: 14
- TV partner(s): CBC, CTV, SRC (Canada); CBS (United States)

Draft
- Top draft pick: Gilbert Perreault
- Picked by: Buffalo Sabres

Regular season
- Season champions: Boston Bruins
- Season MVP: Bobby Orr (Bruins)
- Top scorer: Phil Esposito (Bruins)

Playoffs
- Playoffs MVP: Ken Dryden (Canadiens)

Stanley Cup
- Champions: Montreal Canadiens
- Runners-up: Chicago Black Hawks

NHL seasons
- 1969–70 1971–72

The 1970–71 NHL season was the 54th season of the National Hockey League. Two new teams, the Buffalo Sabres and Vancouver Canucks made their debuts and were both put into the East Division. The Chicago Black Hawks were moved to the West Division, and the Oakland Seals were renamed the California Golden Seals. The Montreal Canadiens won the Stanley Cup by beating the Black Hawks in seven games in the Stanley Cup Final.

== League business ==
The NHL added two expansion teams in Buffalo and Vancouver. The 1970 NHL expansion draft was held on June 10 to fill the rosters of the two new teams.

At the beginning of the season, the Oakland Seals were renamed California Golden Seals.

The 1970 NHL amateur draft was held on June 11 at the Queen Elizabeth Hotel in Montreal, Quebec. Gilbert Perreault was selected first overall by Buffalo.

From this season through the 2002–03 season, teams wore their white (or yellow) jerseys at home and their colored jerseys on the road.

== Regular season ==
For 1970–71 the NHL went to a balanced schedule, with each team playing each other team six times, three at home and three on the road, without regard to divisional alignment. Nevertheless, playoff qualification was determined entirely by divisional standings, with the top four teams in each division qualifying.

This season saw a marked increase in goal scoring, especially by the Boston Bruins, who shattered scoring records as they set the mark for most goals by a team (399) by nearly a hundred over the previous record holder. They also set records for most victories (57) and points (121). Phil Esposito set records for most goals in a season with 76 and for most points with 152. Defenceman Bobby Orr won his second consecutive Hart Memorial Trophy and set a new record for assists with 102. The Bruins also had the four league leading scorers, the first time in history this was achieved (the only other time being by the Bruins in 1973–74), and seven of the top eleven leading scorers, the only time in NHL history this has ever been achieved. They had 6 of the top 8 scorers in the league. Furthermore, the Bruins set marks for the highest scoring single season marks at every position: center (Esposito), left wing (Johnny Bucyk with 116), right wing (Ken Hodge with 105) and defence (Orr), as well as for a forward line (Esposito centering Wayne Cashman and Hodge).

Boston won the East Division championship in a runaway. In the West Division, the powerful Chicago Black Hawks had been moved there partially to accommodate the expansion Buffalo Sabres and Vancouver Canucks (both of which were placed in the East Division) but more in an effort to provide greater balance between the divisions. Chicago broke St. Louis' stranglehold over the division, winning handily over the Blues and advancing to the Stanley Cup Final.

The Montreal Canadiens, who missed the playoffs in 1969–70, appeared to be sinking once more. Players did not like Claude Ruel's dictatorial rule as coach, and Ralph Backstrom and John Ferguson retired. Ruel resigned and Al MacNeil took over. Both Ferguson and Backstrom returned, but Backstrom was later traded to Los Angeles for draft choices. Despite this, they would later win the Stanley Cup that year.

The Vancouver Canucks played well at first and were around the .500 mark at mid-season. Then Orland Kurtenbach was injured and the team sagged.

On October 29, Gordie Howe became the first player to record 1,000 assists in a 5–3 win over Boston at the Detroit Olympia.

Detroit introduced a fine rookie goaltender, Jim Rutherford, who had bright moments despite the Red Wings last place finish. However, they suffered their worst defeat in franchise history January 2, when Toronto crushed them 13–0. Sid Abel, the team's general manager, asked owner Bruce Norris if he could dismiss coach Ned Harkness. Told that he could not, Abel resigned. Norris then elevated Harkness to general manager and Doug Barkley was named coach. Detroit took a tumble to the basement of the East Division after that.

On March 12, Boston's Phil Esposito broke Bobby Hull's record for goals by a player in a season at 7:03 of the first period on Denis DeJordy of Los Angeles at the Forum in Inglewood, California. Then, at 15:40 he became the first player to score 60 goals. The Bruins won 7–2.

In their inaugural season in the NHL, Buffalo had a star in Gilbert Perreault. On March 18, he broke Nels Stewart's (and Danny Grant's, and Norm Ferguson's) rookie record with his 35th goal in a 5–3 win over St. Louis. He went on to finish the season with 38.

Billy Taylor and Don Gallinger, now middle-aged, were finally forgiven for their gambling in 1948 and were reinstated to the NHL. However, they did not return to the NHL.

=== Final standings ===
East Division
		GP	W	L	T	GF	GA	DIFF	Pts
1	Boston Bruins	78	57	14	7	399	207	+192	121
2	New York Rangers	78	49	18	11	259	177	+82	109
3	Montreal Canadiens	78	42	23	13	291	216	+75	97
4	Toronto Maple Leafs	78	37	33	8	248	211	+37	82
5	Buffalo Sabres	78	24	39	15	217	291	−74	63
6	Vancouver Canucks	78	24	46	8	229	296	−67	56
7	Detroit Red Wings	78	22	45	11	209	308	−99	55

West Division
		GP	W	L	T	GF	GA	DIFF	Pts
1	Chicago Black Hawks	78	49	20	9	277	184	+93	107
2	St. Louis Blues	78	34	25	19	223	208	+15	87
3	Philadelphia Flyers	78	28	33	17	207	225	−18	73
4	Minnesota North Stars	78	28	34	16	191	223	−32	72
5	Los Angeles Kings	78	25	40	13	239	303	−64	63
6	Pittsburgh Penguins	78	21	37	20	221	240	−19	62
7	California Golden Seals	78	20	53	5	199	320	−121	45

== Playoffs ==
=== Format change ===
Due to three straight years of non-competitive finals (where the West Division-winning St. Louis Blues were swept all 3 years by an established East Division club); the NHL changed the match-ups for the semifinals by having the winner of the series of the 1st vs. 3rd East Division teams play the winner of the 2nd vs. 4th West Division teams. Similarly, the other semifinal series pitted the winner of the 1st vs. 3rd West Division teams against the winner of the 2nd vs. 4th East Division teams. Combined with the transfer of the Chicago Black Hawks into the West Division (which previously consisted only of expansion teams), the Stanley Cup Final series was expected to be more competitive. The realignment and change in playoff format brought the desired results, but at the expense of the expansion teams; seven of the eight finalists were Original Six teams over the next four seasons; the first three seasons had two East Division teams or Montreal v. Chicago, and no sweeps in the Stanley Cup Final. Until realignment in 1974–75, when the Original Six and expansion teams were more thoroughly mixed, the Philadelphia Flyers were the only expansion team to reach a Cup final, which they won in 1974.

A significant controversy arose before the playoffs. With 4 games to play, the Minnesota North Stars were in 3rd place with a record of 28–30–16 for 72 points while the Philadelphia Flyers were in 4th at 26–33–15 for 67 points. Minnesota then lost their final four games while the Flyers went 2–0–2 to jump ahead of Minnesota in the final standings by 1 point. It was widely rumored that Minnesota did so to avoid playing the far superior Chicago Black Hawks, since at this time in the playoffs the first place team played the third place team and the second played the fourth. Nothing was proven against the North Stars (who defeated their first-round opponent, St. Louis, four games to two, while the Flyers were swept by the powerful Black Hawks), but the format was changed the next year to the 1 vs. 4/2 vs. 3 format that prevailed thereafter.

=== Playoff bracket ===
Quarterfinals
E1	Boston	3
E3	Montreal	4
W2	St. Louis	2
W4	Minnesota	4
W1	Chicago	4
W3	Philadelphia	0
E2	New York	4
E4	Toronto	2

Semifinals
E3	Montreal	4
W4	Minnesota	2
W1	Chicago	4
E2	New York	3

Stanley Cup Final
E3	Montreal	4
W1	Chicago	3

=== Quarterfinals ===
==== (E1) Boston Bruins vs. (E3) Montreal Canadiens ====
The Boston Bruins finished first in the league with 121 points. The Montreal Canadiens finished third in the East Division with 97 points. This was the fifteenth playoff series between these two teams with Montreal winning twelve of the fourteen previous series. They last met in the 1969 Stanley Cup semifinals which Montreal won in six games. Boston won five of the six games in this year's regular season series.

The Montreal Canadiens were matched against the Boston Bruins, and in one of the most extraordinary upsets in hockey history, Ken Dryden was hot in goal for the Canadiens as they ousted the Bruins in seven games. Game 2 featured what many perceive as one of the greatest comebacks in NHL history. With the Bruins leading 5–2 heading into the third period, the Canadiens, who had trailed 5–1, scored 5 goals in the final session to win 7–5. The prominent Canadian sports journalist Red Fisher lists the Canadiens' comeback has the 8th most memorable moment in his over 49 years of covering hockey. In game 4, Bobby Orr became the first defenceman to get a hat trick in a playoff game when Boston won 5–2.

April 7	Montreal Canadiens	1–3	Boston Bruins	Boston Garden	Recap
No scoring		First period	03:57 – pp – Bobby Orr (1)
John Ferguson (1) – pp – 01:34		Second period	09:41 – Wayne Cashman (1)
No scoring		Third period	08:47 – Fred Stanfield (1)
Ken Dryden 39 saves / 42 shots		Goalie stats	Gerry Cheevers 30 saves / 31 shots

April 8	Montreal Canadiens	7–5	Boston Bruins	Boston Garden	Recap
Yvan Cournoyer (1) – 03:32		First period	04:34 – Bobby Orr (2); 05:43 – Ted Green (1)
Henri Richard (1) – 15:33		Second period	02:49 – pp – John McKenzie (1); 06:31 – Wayne Cashman (2); 08:41 – Derek Sanderson (1)
Jean Beliveau (1) – pp – 02:58; Jean Beliveau (2) – 04:22; Jacques Lemaire (1) – 09:59; John Ferguson (2) – 15:23; Frank Mahovlich (1) – 18:40		Third period	No scoring
Ken Dryden 31 saves / 36 shots		Goalie stats	Eddie Johnston 30 saves / 37 shots

April 10	Boston Bruins	1–3	Montreal Canadiens	Montreal Forum	Recap
Phil Esposito (1) – 00:29		First period	No scoring
No scoring		Second period	04:04 – Frank Mahovlich (2); 12:05 – Jacques Laperriere (1)
No scoring		Third period	03:55 – Frank Mahovlich (3)
Gerry Cheevers 28 saves / 31 shots		Goalie stats	Ken Dryden 37 saves / 38 shots

April 11	Boston Bruins	5–2	Montreal Canadiens	Montreal Forum	Recap
No scoring		First period	05:30 – pp – Frank Mahovlich (4)
Bobby Orr (3) – 11:01; Mike Walton (1) – pp – 18:26		Second period	No scoring
Bobby Orr (4) – 00:37; Fred Stanfield (2) – 17:21; Bobby Orr (5) – sh – 19:57		Third period	06:13 – Yvan Cournoyer (2)
Gerry Cheevers 26 saves / 28 shots		Goalie stats	Ken Dryden 29 saves / 33 shots

April 13	Montreal Canadiens	3–7	Boston Bruins	Boston Garden	Recap
Yvan Cournoyer (3) – 05:38		First period	00:57 – Wayne Cashman (3); 09:32 – pp – Phil Esposito (2); 16:45 – Mike Walton (2)
No scoring		Second period	11:44 – John McKenzie (2); 17:43 – sh – Ed Westfall (1)
Frank Mahovlich (5) – 01:55; John Ferguson (3) – 08:19		Third period	12:47 – Johnny Bucyk (1); 15:57 – Ken Hodge (1)
Ken Dryden 49 saves / 56 shots		Goalie stats	Gerry Cheevers 24 saves / 27 shots

April 15	Boston Bruins	3–8	Montreal Canadiens	Montreal Forum	Recap
Phil Esposito (3) – pp – 09:51		First period	06:36 – Peter Mahovlich (1); 11:12 – Henri Richard (2)
Fred Stanfield (3) – pp – 05:57		Second period	10:34 – pp – Jacques Lemaire (2); 14:39 – J.C. Tremblay (1)
Derek Sanderson (2) – 16:52		Third period	05:14 – Henri Richard (3); 14:46 – Peter Mahovlich (2); 17:15 – Marc Tardif (1); 19:34 – pp – Jacques Laperriere (2)
Gerry Cheevers 35 saves / 43 shots		Goalie stats	Ken Dryden 29 saves / 32 shots

April 18	Montreal Canadiens	4–2	Boston Bruins	Boston Garden	Recap
Frank Mahovlich (6) – 14:48; Rejean Houle (1) – 17:38		First period	06:50 – Ken Hodge (2)
J.C. Tremblay (2) – 15:44		Second period	No scoring
Frank Mahovlich (7) – 00:14		Third period	01:02 – Johnny Bucyk (2)
Ken Dryden 46 saves / 48 shots		Goalie stats	Gerry Cheevers 30 saves / 34 shots

Montreal won series 4–3

==== (E2) New York Rangers vs. (E4) Toronto Maple Leafs ====
The New York Rangers finished second in the East Division with 109 points. The Toronto Maple Leafs finished fourth with 82 points. This was the eighth playoff meeting between these two teams with New York winning four of the seven previous series. They last met in the 1962 Stanley Cup semifinals which Toronto won in six games. New York won five of the six games in this year's regular season series.

April 7	Toronto Maple Leafs	4–5	New York Rangers	Madison Square Garden	Recap
Dave Keon (1) – 04:56; Dave Keon (2) – 19:55		First period	06:05 – pp – Vic Hadfield (1)
Paul Henderson (1) – 10:10; Paul Henderson (2) – 13:13		Second period	10:05 – pp – Rod Gilbert (1); 19:57 – Bob Nevin (1)
No scoring		Third period	01:20 – Vic Hadfield (2); 06:44 – Walt Tkaczuk (1)
Jacques Plante 26 saves / 31 shots		Goalie stats	Ed Giacomin 24 saves / 28 shots

April 8	Toronto Maple Leafs	4–1	New York Rangers	Madison Square Garden	Recap
Garry Monahan (1) – 13:23; Paul Henderson (3) – 14:11		First period	No scoring
Dave Keon (3) – 01:35		Second period	16:11 – Tim Horton (1)
Paul Henderson (4) – 11:53		Third period	No scoring
Jacques Plante 2 saves / 2 shots Bernie Parent 21 saves / 22 shots		Goalie stats	Ed Giacomin 19 saves / 23 shots

April 10	New York Rangers	1–3	Toronto Maple Leafs	Maple Leaf Gardens	Recap
No scoring		First period	05:03 – pp – Ron Ellis (1)
No scoring		Second period	04:19 – pp – Paul Henderson (5)
Dave Balon (1) – 03:17		Third period	05:22 – Garry Monahan (2)
Gilles Villemure 21 saves / 24 shots		Goalie stats	Bernie Parent 33 saves / 34 shots

April 11	New York Rangers	4–2	Toronto Maple Leafs	Maple Leaf Gardens	Recap
Bob Nevin (2) – pp – 12:54		First period	No scoring
Vic Hadfield (3) – 04:41; Dave Balon (2) – pp – 07:41; Ron Stewart (1) – sh – 18:10		Second period	19:33 – pp – Darryl Sittler (1)
No scoring		Third period	11:12 – Darryl Sittler (2)
Ed Giacomin 24 saves / 25 shots		Goalie stats	Bernie Parent 26 saves / 29 shots

April 13	Toronto Maple Leafs	1–3	New York Rangers	Madison Square Garden	Recap
No scoring		First period	00:34 – Ted Irvine (1)
No scoring		Second period	04:59 – Vic Hadfield (4)
Jim McKenny (1) – pp – 13:42		Third period	06:25 – Bob Nevin (3)
Bernie Parent 26 saves / 29 shots		Goalie stats	Ed Giacomin 24 saves / 25 shots

April 15	New York Rangers	2–1	OT	Toronto Maple Leafs	Maple Leaf Gardens	Recap
No scoring		First period		No scoring
Bob Nevin (4) – 12:39		Second period		No scoring
No scoring		Third period		17:26 – Jim McKenny (2)
Bob Nevin (5) – 09:07		First overtime period		No scoring
Ed Giacomin 27 saves / 28 shots		Goalie stats		Jacques Plante 36 saves / 38 shots

New York won series 4–2

==== (W1) Chicago Black Hawks vs. (W3) Philadelphia Flyers ====
The Chicago Black Hawks finished first in the West Division with 107 points. The Philadelphia Flyers finished third in the West Division with 73 points. This was the first playoff meeting between these two teams. Chicago won this year's six game regular season series earning nine of twelve points.

April 7	Philadelphia Flyers	2–5	Chicago Black Hawks	Chicago Stadium	Recap
Bill Lesuk (1) – pp – 19:02		First period	02:50 – pp – Bobby Hull (1); 07:05 – sh – Pat Stapleton (1)
Bob Kelly (1) – 11:06		Second period	06:24 – pp – Bobby Hull (2); 18:26 – pp – Doug Jarrett (1)
No scoring		Third period	00:59 – Pit Martin (1)
Doug Favell 24 saves / 29 shots		Goalie stats	Tony Esposito 33 saves / 35 shots

April 8	Philadelphia Flyers	2–6	Chicago Black Hawks	Chicago Stadium	Recap
No scoring		First period	16:18 – Bobby Hull (3); 17:00 – Stan Mikita (1)
No scoring		Second period	04:46 – Stan Mikita (2); 10:39 – Bobby Hull (4); 18:57 – Jim Pappin (1)
Jim Mair (1) – pp – 06:18; Garry Peters (1) – 16:11		Third period	09:41 – Lou Angotti (1)
Bruce Gamble 32 saves / 38 shots		Goalie stats	Tony Esposito 25 saves / 27 shots

April 10	Chicago Black Hawks	3–2	Philadelphia Flyers	The Spectrum	Recap
Pat Stapleton (2) – pp – 13:30		First period	10:18 – Rick MacLeish (1)
No scoring		Second period	06:42 – pp – Simon Nolet (1)
Bobby Hull (5) – pp – 05:52; Bobby Hull (6) – pp – 10:24		Third period	No scoring
Tony Esposito 28 saves / 30 shots		Goalie stats	Doug Favell 28 saves / 31 shots

April 11	Chicago Black Hawks	6–2	Philadelphia Flyers	The Spectrum	Recap
Jim Pappin (2) – 00:21; Jim Pappin (3) – pp – 09:16		First period	14:33 – pp – Serge Bernier (1)
Pit Martin (2) – 09:54		Second period	No scoring
Cliff Koroll (1) – 03:24; Cliff Koroll (2) – 08:37; Jim Pappin (4) – 11:26		Third period	10:07 – Simon Nolet (2)
Tony Esposito 38 saves / 40 shots		Goalie stats	Bruce Gamble 23 saves / 29 shots

Chicago won series 4–0

==== (W2) St. Louis Blues vs. (W4) Minnesota North Stars ====
The St. Louis Blues finished second in the West Division with 87 points. The Minnesota North Stars finished fourth in the West Division with 72 points. This was the third playoff meeting between these two teams with St. Louis winning both of the previous series. They met in the previous year's Stanley Cup quarterfinals which the Blues won in six games. Minnesota won this year's six game regular season series earning eight of twelve points.

April 7	Minnesota North Stars	3–2	St. Louis Blues	St. Louis Arena	Recap
Jude Drouin (1) – 05:16		First period	10:52 – Fran Huck (1)
No scoring		Second period	No scoring
J.P. Parise (1) – pp – 03:57; Danny Grant (1) – pp – 07:12		Third period	19:54 – Garry Unger (1)
Cesare Maniago 42 saves / 44 shots		Goalie stats	Glenn Hall 19 saves / 22 shots

April 8	Minnesota North Stars	2–4	St. Louis Blues	St. Louis Arena	Recap
No scoring		First period	No scoring
No scoring		Second period	10:19 – Bill McCreary Sr. (1)
Murray Oliver (1) – 00:09; Murray Oliver (2) – 10:58		Third period	03:45 – Jimmy Roberts (1); 08:34 – pp – Wayne Connelly (1); 19:40 – Jimmy Roberts (2)
Cesare Maniago 26 saves / 29 shots		Goalie stats	Ernie Wakely 26 saves / 28 shots

April 10	St. Louis Blues	3–0	Minnesota North Stars	Met Center	Recap
No scoring		First period	No scoring
Frank St. Marseille (1) – pp – 08:04; Noel Picard (1) – pp – 19:17		Second period	No scoring
Terry Crisp (1) – 08:39		Third period	No scoring
Ernie Wakely 29 saves / 29 shots		Goalie stats	Cesare Maniago 24 saves / 27 shots

April 11	St. Louis Blues	1–2	Minnesota North Stars	Met Center	Recap
Garry Unger (2) – sh – 04:08		First period	No scoring
No scoring		Second period	No scoring
No scoring		Third period	02:44 – Bobby Rousseau (1); 03:08 – Charlie Burns (1)
Glenn Hall 20 saves / 22 shots		Goalie stats	Gump Worsley 25 saves / 26 shots

April 13	Minnesota North Stars	4–3	St. Louis Blues	St. Louis Arena	Recap
Murray Oliver (3) – pp – 05:03; Jude Drouin (2) – pp – 16:33		First period	04:28 – Craig Cameron (1)
Jude Drouin (3) – 02:49		Second period	02:42 – Craig Cameron (2); 09:43 – Wayne Connelly (2)
Lou Nanne (1) – 16:25		Third period	No scoring
Gump Worsley 33 saves / 36 shots		Goalie stats	Glenn Hall 18 saves / 22 shots

April 15	St. Louis Blues	2–5	Minnesota North Stars	Met Center	Recap
No scoring		First period	No scoring
Frank St. Marseille (2) – pp – 04:45		Second period	10:36 – Ted Hampson (1); 10:58 – Lou Nanne (2); 14:15 – pp – Bobby Rousseau; 19:29 – pp – Doug Mohns (1)
Garry Unger (2) – 17:20		Third period	07:01 – Doug Mohns (2)
Ernie Wakely 25 saves / 30 shots		Goalie stats	Gump Worsley 19 saves / 21 shots

Minnesota won series 4–2

=== Semifinals ===
==== (E3) Montreal Canadiens vs. (W4) Minnesota North Stars ====
This was the first playoff series between these two teams. Montreal won this year's six game regular season series earning eight of twelve points.

The Canadiens' upset of Boston was so sensational that the Canadiens nearly suffered a fatal letdown against the Minnesota North Stars. The Canadiens' 6–3 loss in Montreal on April 22 to Minnesota, led by the goaltending of Cesare Maniago was the first playoff defeat for an Original Six team at the hands of a 1967 Expansion franchise.

April 20	Minnesota North Stars	2–7	Montreal Canadiens	Montreal Forum	Recap
Danny Grant (2) – pp – 11:45		First period	No scoring
No scoring		Second period	05:48 – Marc Tardif (2); 11:07 – Jacques Lemaire (3); 16:33 – pp – Jacques Lemaire (4); 18:51 – Jacques Lemaire (5)
Bill Goldsworthy (1) – 17:12		Third period	07:26 – Marc Tardif (3); 15:21 – pp – Guy Lapointe (1); 17:40 – Frank Mahovlich (8)
Gump Worsley 26 saves / 33 shots		Goalie stats	Ken Dryden 26 saves / 28 shots

April 22	Minnesota North Stars	6–3	Montreal Canadiens	Montreal Forum	Recap
J. P. Parise (2) – pp – 05:14; Jude Drouin (4) – 10:04; Ted Hampson (2) – pp – 15:58; Lou Nanne (3) – 19:04		First period	No scoring
Murray Oliver (4) – 17:46		Second period	04:17 – Peter Mahovlich (3); 16:41 – Guy Lapointe (2)
Charlie Burns (1) – en – 19:36		Third period	04:59 – Jean Beliveau (3)
Cesare Maniago 32 saves / 35 shots		Goalie stats	Ken Dryden 29 saves / 34 shots

April 24	Montreal Canadiens	6–3	Minnesota North Stars	Met Center	Recap
Frank Mahovlich (9) – 08:47; Jacques Lemaire (6) – 17:39		First period	07:11 – Murray Oliver (5)
Yvan Cournoyer (4) – 01:45; J. C. Tremblay (3) – pp – 05:17; Jacques Laperriere (3) – 08:30		Second period	15:56 – Danny Grant (3)
Jacques Laperriere (4) – 02:26		Third period	19:34 – Bill Goldsworthy (2)
Ken Dryden 30 saves / 33 shots		Goalie stats	Cesare Maniago 25 saves / 31 shots

April 25	Montreal Canadiens	2–5	Minnesota North Stars	Met Center	Recap
Jean Beliveau (4) – 01:22		First period	16:35 – pp – Murray Oliver (6); 19:04 – pp – Danny Grant (4)
Jean Beliveau (5) – 07:52		Second period	No scoring
No scoring		Third period	03:00 – J. P. Parise (3); 11:26 – Murray Oliver (7); 15:59 – Ted Hampson (3)
Ken Dryden 37 saves / 42 shots		Goalie stats	Cesare Maniago 35 saves / 37 shots

April 27	Minnesota North Stars	1–6	Montreal Canadiens	Montreal Forum	Recap
No scoring		First period	No scoring
No scoring		Second period	02:24 – Peter Mahovlich (4)
Danny Grant (5) – 01:40		Third period	01:14 – Guy Lapointe (3); 10:08 – pp – Peter Mahovlich (5); 12:50 – John Ferguson (4); 13:41 – Frank Mahovlich (10); 14:35 – Yvan Cournoyer (5)
Cesare Maniago 24 saves / 30 shots		Goalie stats	Ken Dryden 26 saves / 27 shots

April 29	Montreal Canadiens	3–2	Minnesota North Stars	Met Center	Recap
Yvan Cournoyer (6) – pp – 16:00		First period	09:50 – Charlie Burns (2)
Claude Larose (1) – 01:07; Rejean Houle (2) – 13:29		Second period	09:18 – Jude Drouin (5)
No scoring		Third period	No scoring
Ken Dryden 30 saves / 32 shots		Goalie stats	Cesare Maniago 34 saves / 37 shots

Montreal won series 4–2

==== (W1) Chicago Black Hawks vs. (E2) New York Rangers ====
This was the third playoff series between these two teams with Chicago winning both previous series. They last met in the 1968 Stanley Cup quarterfinals which the Black Hawks won in six games. The teams split this year's six-game regular season series.

Bobby Hull and the Chicago Black Hawks were just too much for the Rangers and the Black Hawks advanced to the Stanley Cup Final in seven games. Hull won two games with goals on face-offs, despite Glen Sather's coverage to check him.

April 18	New York Rangers	2–1	OT	Chicago Black Hawks	Chicago Stadium	Recap
No scoring		First period		12:59 – pp – Cliff Koroll (3)
No scoring		Second period		No scoring
Jean Ratelle (1) – 16:44		Third period		No scoring
Pete Stemkowski (1) – 01:37		First overtime period		No scoring
Eddie Giacomin 31 saves / 32 shots		Goalie stats		Tony Esposito 32 saves / 34 shots

April 20	New York Rangers	0–3	Chicago Black Hawks	Chicago Stadium	Recap
No scoring		First period	17:54 – Cliff Koroll (4)
No scoring		Second period	14:06 – Dennis Hull (1)
No scoring		Third period	19:45 – en – Dennis Hull (2)
Eddie Giacomin 26 saves / 28 shots		Goalie stats	Tony Esposito 32 saves / 32 shots

April 22	Chicago Black Hawks	1–4	New York Rangers	Madison Square Garden	Recap
Stan Mikita (3) – 05:16		First period	03:05 – Vic Hadfield (5); 13:37 – Rod Gilbert (2); 15:50 – Vic Hadfield (6)
No scoring		Second period	No scoring
No scoring		Third period	16:09 – Vic Hadfield (7)
Tony Esposito 28 saves / 32 shots		Goalie stats	Eddie Giacomin 16 saves / 17 shots

April 25	Chicago Black Hawks	7–1	New York Rangers	Madison Square Garden	Recap
Jim Pappin (5) – 12:49		First period	No scoring
Bill White (1) – 05:45; Danny O'Shea (1) – 07:28; Stan Mikita (4) – 17:23		Second period	No scoring
Dennis Hull (3) – 00:14; Chico Maki (1) – 12:09; Jerry Korab (1) – 18:24		Third period	14:34 – pp – Dave Balon (3)
Tony Esposito 27 saves / 28 shots		Goalie stats	Eddie Giacomin 20 saves / 24 shots Gilles Villemure 8 saves / 11 shots

April 27	New York Rangers	2–3	OT	Chicago Black Hawks	Chicago Stadium	Recap
Vic Hadfield (8) – 15:57		First period		10:56 – Pat Stapleton (3); 15:41 – pp – Chico Maki (2)
Rod Seiling (1) – 19:28		Second period		No scoring
No scoring		Third period		No scoring
No scoring		First overtime period		06:35 – Bobby Hull (7)
Eddie Giacomin 29 saves / 32 shots		Goalie stats		Tony Esposito 27 saves / 29 shots

April 29	Chicago Black Hawks	2–3	3OT	New York Rangers	Madison Square Garden	Recap
Dennis Hull (4) – 10:19		First period		No scoring
Chico Maki (3) – 01:54		Second period		07:07 – Rod Gilbert (3)
No scoring		Third period		04:21 – Jean Ratelle (2)
No scoring		Third overtime period		01:29 – Pete Stemkowski (2)
Tony Esposito 46 saves / 49 shots		Goalie stats		Eddie Giacomin 24 saves / 26 shots

May 2	New York Rangers	2–4	Chicago Black Hawks	Chicago Stadium	Recap
Pete Stemkowski (3) – 18:31		First period	14:49 – pp – Jim Pappin (6)
Rod Gilbert (4) – 11:43		Second period	13:27 – pp – Cliff Koroll (5)
No scoring		Third period	04:25 – Bobby Hull (8); 19:34 – en – Chico Maki (4)
Eddie Giacomin 25 saves / 28 shots		Goalie stats	Tony Esposito 36 saves / 38 shots

Chicago won series 4–3

=== Stanley Cup Final ===
This was the fifteenth series between these two teams with the Montreal Canadiens winning nine of the fourteen previous series. They last met in the 1968 Stanley Cup semifinals which Montreal won in five games. The teams split this year's six-game regular season series.

The series went the full seven games, with the Canadiens winning in Chicago despite trailing 2–0 halfway into the second period of game seven. Jacques Lemaire took a shot from centre ice that miraculously escaped goaltender Tony Esposito cutting the Black Hawks' lead to 2–1. Henri Richard tied the game just before the end of the second period, and scored again 02:34 into the third, giving the Habs the lead. Montreal goalie Ken Dryden kept Chicago off the board for the rest of the game, and the Habs won their third Stanley Cup in four years. It was the final game for Canadiens superstar and captain Jean Beliveau who retired after the season. The Canadiens were the last road team to win a Game 7 of a Stanley Cup Final until the Pittsburgh Penguins in 2009. It was Al MacNeil's final game as Montreal coach — after he had benched Richard for Game 5, The Pocket Rocket declared "[MacNeil] is the worst coach I ever played for!" Although Richard retracted his "angry comment", as he called it, MacNeil still resigned.

May 4	Montreal Canadiens	1–2	2OT	Chicago Black Hawks	Chicago Stadium	Recap
No scoring		First period		No scoring
Jacques Lemaire (7) – pp – 12:29		Second period		No scoring
No scoring		Third period		07:54 – pp – Bobby Hull (9)
No scoring		Second overtime period		01:11 – Jim Pappin (7)
Ken Dryden 56 saves / 58 shots		Goalie stats		Tony Esposito 36 saves / 37 shots

May 6	Montreal Canadiens	3–5	Chicago Black Hawks	Chicago Stadium	Recap
Jacques Lemaire (8) – pp – 09:06; Peter Mahovlich (6) – 17:58		First period	04:39 – pp – Bobby Hull (10)
No scoring		Second period	11:58 – Chico Maki (5); 13:50 – Jim Pappin (8)
Frank Mahovlich (11) – 08:56		Third period	07:27 – Lou Angotti (2); 16:47 – Lou Angotti (3)
Ken Dryden 30 saves / 35 shots		Goalie stats	Tony Esposito 24 saves / 27 shots

May 9	Chicago Black Hawks	2–4	Montreal Canadiens	Montreal Forum	Recap
Cliff Koroll (6) – pp – 04:26; Bobby Hull (11) – 13:38		First period	No scoring
No scoring		Second period	05:56 – Peter Mahovlich (7); 17:34 – pp – Frank Mahovlich (12)
No scoring		Third period	06:23 – Yvan Cournoyer (7); 12:13 – pp – Frank Mahovlich (13)
Tony Esposito 36 saves / 40 shots		Goalie stats	Ken Dryden 16 saves / 18 shots

May 11	Chicago Black Hawks	2–5	Montreal Canadiens	Montreal Forum	Recap
Stan Mikita (5) – pp – 03:09		First period	01:00 – Peter Mahovlich (8); 06:55 – pp – Jean Beliveau (6); 16:33 – Guy Lapointe (4)
Dennis Hull (5) – 12:30		Second period	09:07 – Yvan Cournoyer (8); 15:53 – pp – Yvan Cournoyer (9)
No scoring		Third period	No scoring
Tony Esposito 27 saves / 32 shots		Goalie stats	Ken Dryden 30 saves / 32 shots

May 13	Montreal Canadiens	0–2	Chicago Black Hawks	Chicago Stadium	Recap
No scoring		First period	10:57 – pp – Dennis Hull (6)
No scoring		Second period	11:26 – Cliff Koroll (7)
No scoring		Third period	No scoring
Ken Dryden 20 saves / 22 shots		Goalie stats	Tony Esposito 31 saves / 31 shots

May 16	Chicago Black Hawks	3–4	Montreal Canadiens	Montreal Forum	Recap
Jim Pappin (9) – 11:25		First period	12:33 – Yvan Cournoyer (10)
Chico Maki (6) – 17:40; Jim Pappin (10) – 18:48		Second period	05:04 – Peter Mahovlich (9)
No scoring		Third period	05:10 – Frank Mahovlich (14); 08:56 – sh – Peter Mahovlich (10)
Tony Esposito 12 saves / 16 shots		Goalie stats	Ken Dryden 27 saves / 30 shots

May 18	Montreal Canadiens	3–2	Chicago Black Hawks	Chicago Stadium	Recap
No scoring		First period	19:12 – pp – Dennis Hull (7)
Jacques Lemaire (9) – 14:18; Henri Richard (4) – 18:20		Second period	07:33 – Danny O'Shea (2)
Henri Richard (5) – 02:34		Third period	No scoring
Ken Dryden 31 saves / 33 shots		Goalie stats	Tony Esposito 22 saves / 25 shots

Montreal won series 4–3

== Awards ==
A new award for the most outstanding player as voted by the members of the NHL Players Association, the Lester B. Pearson Award, was introduced this season and the first winner was Phil Esposito.

1971 NHL awards
Prince of Wales Trophy: (East Division champion, regular season)	Boston Bruins
Clarence S. Campbell Bowl: (West Division champion, regular season)	Chicago Black Hawks
Art Ross Trophy: (Top scorer, regular season)	Phil Esposito, Boston Bruins
Bill Masterton Memorial Trophy: (Perseverance, sportsmanship, and dedication)	Jean Ratelle, New York Rangers
Calder Memorial Trophy: (Top first-year player)	Gilbert Perreault, Buffalo Sabres
Conn Smythe Trophy: (Most valuable player, playoffs)	Ken Dryden, Montreal Canadiens
Hart Memorial Trophy: (Most valuable player, regular season)	Bobby Orr, Boston Bruins
James Norris Memorial Trophy: (Best defenceman)	Bobby Orr, Boston Bruins
Lady Byng Memorial Trophy: (Excellence and sportsmanship)	Johnny Bucyk, Boston Bruins
Lester B. Pearson Award: (Outstanding player, regular season)	Phil Esposito, Boston Bruins
Vezina Trophy: (Goaltender(s) of team with best goaltending record)	Eddie Giacomin & Gilles Villemure, New York Rangers

=== All-Star teams ===
First Team	Position	Second Team
Ed Giacomin, New York Rangers	G	Jacques Plante, Toronto Maple Leafs
Bobby Orr, Boston Bruins	D	Brad Park, New York Rangers
J. C. Tremblay, Montreal Canadiens	D	Pat Stapleton, Chicago Black Hawks
Phil Esposito, Boston Bruins	C	Dave Keon, Toronto Maple Leafs
Ken Hodge, Boston Bruins	RW	Yvan Cournoyer, Montreal Canadiens
Johnny Bucyk, Boston Bruins	LW	Bobby Hull, Chicago Black Hawks

== Player statistics ==
=== Scoring leaders ===
Player	Team	GP	G	A	Pts	PIM
Phil Esposito	Boston Bruins	78	76	76	152	71
Bobby Orr	Boston Bruins	78	37	102	139	91
Johnny Bucyk	Boston Bruins	78	51	65	116	8
Ken Hodge	Boston Bruins	78	43	62	105	113
Bobby Hull	Chicago Black Hawks	78	44	52	96	32
Norm Ullman	Toronto Maple Leafs	73	34	51	85	24
Wayne Cashman	Boston Bruins	77	21	58	79	100
John McKenzie	Boston Bruins	65	31	46	77	120
Dave Keon	Toronto Maple Leafs	76	38	38	76	4
Jean Beliveau	Montreal Canadiens	70	25	51	76	40
Fred Stanfield	Boston Bruins	75	24	52	76	12

Source: NHL.

=== Leading goaltenders ===
Note: GP = Games played; Min – Minutes played; GA = Goals against; GAA = Goals against average; W = Wins; L = Losses; T = Ties; SO = Shutouts

Player	Team	GP	MIN	GA	GAA	W	L	T	SO
Jacques Plante	Toronto Maple Leafs	40	2329	73	1.88	24	11	4	4
Eddie Giacomin	New York Rangers	45	2641	95	2.16	27	10	7	8
Tony Esposito	Chicago Black Hawks	57	3325	126	2.27	35	14	6	6
Gilles Villemure	New York Rangers	34	2039	78	2.30	22	8	4	4
Glenn Hall	St. Louis Blues	32	1761	71	2.42	13	11	8	2
Gump Worsley	Minnesota North Stars	24	1369	57	2.50	4	10	8	0
Eddie Johnston	Boston Bruins	38	2280	96	2.53	30	6	2	4
Rogie Vachon	Montreal Canadiens	47	2676	118	2.64	23	12	9	2
Doug Favell	Philadelphia Flyers	44	2434	108	2.66	16	15	9	2
Cesare Maniago	Minnesota North Stars	40	2380	107	2.70	19	15	6	5

=== Other statistics ===
- Plus/minus leader: Bobby Orr, Boston Bruins

== Coaches ==
=== East ===
- Boston Bruins: Tom Johnson
- Buffalo Sabres: George "Punch" Imlach
- Detroit Red Wings: Ned Harkness and Doug Barkley
- Montreal Canadiens: Claude Ruel and Al MacNeil
- New York Rangers: Emile Francis
- Toronto Maple Leafs: John McLellan
- Vancouver Canucks: Hal Laycoe

=== West ===
- California Golden Seals: Fred Glover
- Chicago Black Hawks: Billy Reay
- Los Angeles Kings: Larry Regan
- Minnesota North Stars: Jack Gordon
- Philadelphia Flyers: Vic Stasiuk
- Pittsburgh Penguins: Red Kelly
- St. Louis Blues: Scotty Bowman and Al Arbour

== Debuts ==
The following is a list of players of note who played their first NHL game in 1970–71 (listed with their first team, asterisk(*) marks debut in playoffs):

- Reggie Leach, Boston Bruins
- Ivan Boldirev, Boston Bruins
- Gilbert Perreault, Buffalo Sabres
- Jerry Korab, Chicago Black Hawks
- Gilles Meloche, Chicago Black Hawks
- Ken Dryden, Montreal Canadiens
- Rick MacLeish, Philadelphia Flyers
- Curt Bennett, St. Louis Blues
- Rene Robert, Toronto Maple Leafs
- Darryl Sittler, Toronto Maple Leafs
- Dale Tallon, Vancouver Canucks

== Last games ==
The following is a list of players of note that played their last game in the NHL in 1970–71 (listed with their last team):

- Jean-Guy Talbot, Buffalo Sabres
- Jean Beliveau, Montreal Canadiens
- John Ferguson, Montreal Canadiens
- Andy Bathgate, Pittsburgh Penguins
- Glenn Hall, St. Louis Blues
- George Armstrong, Toronto Maple Leafs
- Charlie Hodge, Vancouver Canucks

NOTE: Bathgate would finish his major professional career in the World Hockey Association.

== Broadcasting ==
Hockey Night in Canada on CBC Television televised Saturday night regular season games and Stanley Cup playoff games. HNIC also produced Wednesday night regular season game telecasts for CTV.

This was the fifth season under the U.S. rights agreement with CBS, airing Sunday afternoon regular season and playoff games. CBS also televised Game 7 of the 1971 Stanley Cup Final on a Thursday night, marking the first time an American network televised an NHL prime time game, but the telecast was blacked out in the Chicago Black Hawks' broadcast territory.

== See also ==
- List of Stanley Cup champions
- 1970 NHL amateur draft
- 1970 NHL expansion draft
- 1970–71 NHL transactions
- 24th National Hockey League All-Star Game
- National Hockey League All-Star Game
- Lester Patrick Trophy
- 1970 in sports
- 1971 in sports
