= 1970–71 NHL transactions =

The following is a list of all team-to-team transactions that have occurred in the National Hockey League during the 1970–71 NHL season. It lists what team each player has been traded to, signed by, or claimed by, and for which player(s) or draft pick(s), if applicable.

== Trades ==
=== May ===
May 11, 1970	To Los Angeles Kings Ray Fortin	To St. Louis Blues Bob Wall
May 18, 1970	To St. Louis Blues cash	To Toronto Maple Leafs Jacques Plante
May 20, 1970	To Los Angeles Kings Mike Byers	To Philadelphia Flyers Brent Hughes
May 22, 1970	To Montreal Canadiens Francois Lacombe; 1st-round pick - 1971 Amateur Draft (# 1 - Guy Lafleur) cash	To Oakland Seals Ernie Hicke; 1st-round pick - 1970 Amateur Draft (# 10 - Chris Oddleifson)
May 22, 1970	To Montreal Canadiens cash	To Oakland Seals Dennis Hextall
May 22, 1970	To Minnesota North Stars Jude Drouin	To Montreal Canadiens future considerations (Bill Collins)^{1}
May 22, 1970	To Minnesota North Stars Murray Oliver	To Toronto Maple Leafs Brian Conacher; Terry O'Malley
May 22, 1970	To Los Angeles Kings Lucien Grenier; Larry Mickey; Jack Norris	To Montreal Canadiens Gregg Boddy; Leon Rochefort; Wayne Thomas
May 22, 1970	To Montreal Canadiens cash	To St. Louis Blues Christian Bordeleau
May 26, 1970	To Boston Bruins 1st-round pick - 1970 Amateur Draft (# 10 - Ron Plumb)	To St. Louis Blues Jim Lorentz

1. Trade completed on June 10, 1970.

=== June ===
June 9, 1970	To Minnesota North Stars Norm Beaudin	To Montreal Canadiens cash
June 10, 1970	To Minnesota North Stars Bobby Rousseau	To Montreal Canadiens Claude Larose
June 10, 1970	To Buffalo Sabres Ted Hodgson	To New York Rangers cash
June 10, 1970	To Buffalo Sabres Roger Crozier	To Detroit Red Wings Tom Webster
June 10, 1970	To Chicago Black Hawks cash	To Pittsburgh Penguins Dave Dryden
June 10, 1970	To Pittsburgh Penguins future considerations^{1}	To Vancouver Canucks 8th-round pick - 1971 Amateur Draft (# 102 - Bob Murphy)
June 10, 1970	To St. Louis Blues 7th-round pick - 1970 Amateur Draft (# 85 - Jack Taggart); 9th-round pick - 1970 Amateur Draft (# 108 - Bob Winograd) cash	To Vancouver Canucks Andre Boudrias
June 10, 1970	To Montreal Canadiens cash	To St. Louis Blues Murray Flegel
June 10, 1970	To Montreal Canadiens cash	To St. Louis Blues Lyle Carter
June 11, 1970	To Philadelphia Flyers George Swarbrick	To Pittsburgh Penguins Terry Ball

1. Vancouver agrees to not select certain players in the 1970 NHL Expansion Draft.

=== August ===
August, 1970 (exact date unknown)	To Minnesota North Stars Bob McCord	To Montreal Canadiens cash
August, 1970 (exact date unknown)	To Toronto Maple Leafs Pat Hannigan; Ted McCaskill	To Vancouver Canucks Andre Hinse
August 10, 1970	To Minnesota North Stars cash	To St. Louis Blues Bob McCord
August 31, 1970	To Buffalo Sabres Floyd Smith	To Toronto Maple Leafs cash
August 31, 1970	To Buffalo Sabres Brent Imlach	To Toronto Maple Leafs cash

=== September ===
September, 1970 (exact date unknown)	To Toronto Maple Leafs loan of Andre Hinse	To Vancouver Canucks cash
September 3, 1970	To Los Angeles Kings Bob Pulford	To Toronto Maple Leafs Garry Monahan; Brian Murphy
September 9, 1970	To New York Rangers cash	To St. Louis Blues Gerry Lemire

=== October ===
October, 1970 (exact date unknown)	To Buffalo Sabres cash	To St. Louis Blues loan of Gary Edwards
October, 1970 (exact date unknown)	To Buffalo Sabres cash	To Oakland Seals Howie Menard
October 2, 1970	To Buffalo Sabres Ron Anderson	To St. Louis Blues Craig Cameron
October 2, 1970	To Montreal Canadiens cash	To Pittsburgh Penguins Robin Burns
October 8, 1970	To Los Angeles Kings Bob Berry	To Montreal Canadiens cash
October 9, 1970	To Buffalo Sabres Dave Dryden	To Pittsburgh Penguins cash
October 19, 1970	To Buffalo Sabres cash	To St. Louis Blues Bill Sutherland
October 31, 1970	To Detroit Red Wings Larry Brown	To New York Rangers Pete Stemkowski

=== November ===
November 2, 1970	To Detroit Red Wings Don Luce	To New York Rangers Steve Andrascik
November 3, 1970	To Montreal Canadiens Germain Gagnon	To Vancouver Canucks cash
November 4, 1970	To Buffalo Sabres Larry Keenan; Jean-Guy Talbot	To St. Louis Blues Bobby Baun
November 13, 1970	To St. Louis Blues Brit Selby	To Toronto Maple Leafs Bobby Baun
November 24, 1970	To Buffalo Sabres Dick Duff; Eddie Shack	To Los Angeles Kings Mike McMahon Jr. 7th-round pick - 1971 Amateur Draft (# 89 - Peter Harasym); 8th-round pick - 1971 Amateur Draft (# 103 - Lorne Stamler)

=== December ===
December 3, 1970	To St. Louis Blues John Arbour	To Vancouver Canucks cash
December 11, 1970	To Montreal Canadiens cash	To St. Louis Blues Michel Plasse
December 23, 1970	To Montreal Canadiens Terry Clancy	To Toronto Maple Leafs cash

=== January ===
January 13, 1971	To Detroit Red Wings Guy Charron; Bill Collins; Mickey Redmond	To Montreal Canadiens Frank Mahovlich
January 24, 1971	To Buffalo Sabres Terry Ball	To Pittsburgh Penguins Jean-Guy Lagace
January 26, 1971	To New York Rangers Glen Sather	To Pittsburgh Penguins Syl Apps Jr. Sheldon Kannegiesser
January 26, 1971	To Los Angeles Kings Ralph Backstrom	To Montreal Canadiens Ray Fortin; Gord Labossiere; 2nd-round pick - 1973 Amateur Draft (# 22 - Peter Marrin)
January 26, 1971	To Minnesota North Stars Gord Labossiere	To Montreal Canadiens Rey Comeau
January 28, 1971	To Montreal Canadiens 2nd-round pick - 1971 Amateur Draft (# 24 - Michel DeGuise)	To St. Louis Blues Fran Huck
January 31, 1971	To Philadelphia Flyers Bruce Gamble; Mike Walton; 1st-round pick - 1971 Amateur Draft (# 9 - Pierre Plante)	To Toronto Maple Leafs Bernie Parent; 2nd-round pick - 1971 Amateur Draft (# 22 - Rick Kehoe)
January 31, 1971	To Boston Bruins Mike Walton	To Philadelphia Flyers Rick MacLeish; Danny Schock

=== February ===
February 1, 1971	To Los Angeles Kings Red Armstrong	To Toronto Maple Leafs Don Westbrooke
February 1, 1971	To Detroit Red Wings Arnie Brown; Tom Miller; Mike Robitaille	To New York Rangers Larry Brown; Bruce MacGregor
February 5, 1971	To California Golden Seals 8th-round pick in 1971 Amateur Draft (# 104 - Rod Lyons) cash	To Los Angeles Kings Harry Howell
February 6, 1971	To Detroit Red Wings Red Berenson; Tim Ecclestone	To St. Louis Blues Wayne Connelly; Garry Unger
February 22, 1971	To Detroit Red Wings future considerations^{1} (Mike Lowe) (Ab McDonald) (Bob Wall)	To St. Louis Blues Carl Brewer
February 22, 1971	To Chicago Black Hawks Danny O'Shea	To Minnesota North Stars Terry Caffery; Doug Mohns

1. Trade completed on May 12, 1971.

=== March ===
March, 1971 (exact date unknown)	To Los Angeles Kings Wayne Schultz; Steve Sutherland	To Minnesota North Stars Terry Holbrook
March 2, 1971	To Detroit Red Wings Jim Krulicki	To New York Rangers Dale Rolfe
March 7, 1971	To California Golden Seals Dick Redmond; Tom Williams	To Minnesota North Stars Ted Hampson; Wayne Muloin

== Expansion Draft ==
The 1970–71 NHL season saw the entrance of a 13th and 14th team to the league, the Buffalo Sabres and Vancouver Canucks. Each team selected 20 players from across the league, for a total of 40 selections.

== Additional sources ==
- hockeydb.com - search for player and select "show trades"
- "NHL trades for 1970-1971". NHL Trade Tracker.
