= Wayne Muloin =

Canadian ice hockey player

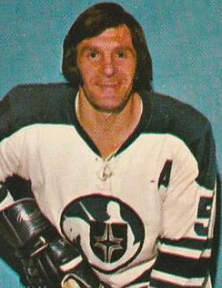
- Muloin in 1972–73
- Born: December 24, 1941 (age 83); Dryden, Ontario, Canada
- Height: 5 ft 8 in (173 cm)
- Weight: 174 lb (79 kg; 12 st 6 lb)
- Position: Defence
- Shot: Left
- Played for: Detroit Red Wings; California Golden Seals; Minnesota North Stars; Cleveland Crusaders; Edmonton Oilers
- Playing career: 1962–1977

John Wayne Muloin (born December 24, 1941, in Dryden, Ontario) is a retired Canadian professional ice hockey player. He played 258 games in the World Hockey Association and 141 games in the National Hockey League between 1963 and 1976. Throughout his career, he played for the Detroit Red Wings, California Golden Seals, Minnesota North Stars, Cleveland Crusaders, Edmonton Oilers, Edmonton Flyers, Cincinnati Wings, St. Paul Rangers, Providence Reds, Vancouver Canucks, Oakland Seals, Cleveland Barons, Syracuse Blazers and Rhode Island Reds.

== Career statistics ==
=== Regular season and playoffs ===
| | | | Regular season | | | | | Playoffs |
| Season | Team | League | GP | G | A | Pts | PIM | GP | G | A | Pts | PIM |
|---|---|---|---|---|---|---|---|---|---|---|---|---|
| 1959–60 | Edmonton Oil Kings | CAHL | — | — | — | — | — | — | — | — | — | — |
| 1959–60 | Edmonton Oil Kings | M-Cup | — | — | — | — | — | 19 | 2 | 3 | 5 | 26 |
| 1960–61 | Edmonton Oil Kings | CAHL | — | — | — | — | — | — | — | — | — | — |
| 1960–61 | Edmonton Oil Kings | M-Cup | — | — | — | — | — | 13 | 0 | 4 | 4 | 35 |
| 1961–62 | Edmonton Oil Kings | CAHL | — | — | — | — | — | — | — | — | — | — |
| 1961–62 | Edmonton Oil Kings | M-Cup | — | — | — | — | — | 21 | 1 | 11 | 12 | 50 |
| 1961–62 | Edmonton Flyers | WHL | 4 | 0 | 0 | 0 | 0 | — | — | — | — | — |
| 1962–63 | Edmonton Flyers | WHL | 61 | 2 | 6 | 8 | 52 | 3 | 0 | 2 | 2 | 2 |
| 1963–64 | Detroit Red Wings | NHL | 3 | 0 | 1 | 1 | 2 | — | — | — | — | — |
| 1963–64 | Cincinnati Wings | CPHL | 69 | 4 | 11 | 15 | 169 | — | — | — | — | — |
| 1964–65 | St. Paul Rangers | CPHL | 67 | 0 | 10 | 10 | 95 | 5 | 0 | 2 | 2 | 6 |
| 1965–66 | Vancouver Canucks | WHL | 15 | 1 | 0 | 1 | 8 | — | — | — | — | — |
| 1965–66 | Providence Reds | AHL | 45 | 3 | 11 | 14 | 70 | — | — | — | — | — |
| 1966–67 | Providence Reds | AHL | 68 | 0 | 10 | 10 | 99 | — | — | — | — | — |
| 1967–68 | Providence Reds | AHL | 66 | 1 | 16 | 17 | 78 | 8 | 0 | 3 | 3 | 10 |
| 1968–69 | Providence Reds | AHL | 72 | 6 | 18 | 24 | 77 | 9 | 0 | 2 | 2 | 10 |
| 1969–70 | Oakland Seals | NHL | 71 | 3 | 6 | 9 | 53 | 4 | 0 | 0 | 0 | 0 |
| 1970–71 | California Golden Seals | NHL | 66 | 0 | 14 | 14 | 32 | — | — | — | — | — |
| 1970–71 | Minnesota North Stars | NHL | 7 | 0 | 0 | 0 | 0 | 7 | 0 | 0 | 0 | 2 |
| 1971–72 | Cleveland Barons | AHL | 71 | 1 | 14 | 15 | 82 | 3 | 0 | 0 | 0 | 6 |
| 1972–73 | Cleveland Crusaders | WHA | 67 | 2 | 13 | 15 | 64 | 9 | 1 | 3 | 4 | 14 |
| 1973–74 | Cleveland Crusaders | WHA | 76 | 3 | 7 | 10 | 39 | 5 | 1 | 0 | 1 | 0 |
| 1974–75 | Cleveland Crusaders | WHA | 78 | 4 | 17 | 21 | 65 | 5 | 0 | 1 | 1 | 4 |
| 1975–76 | Cleveland Crusaders | WHA | 27 | 0 | 5 | 5 | 12 | — | — | — | — | — |
| 1975–76 | Syracuse Blazers | NAHL | 3 | 0 | 0 | 0 | 4 | — | — | — | — | — |
| 1975–76 | Edmonton Oilers | WHA | 10 | 1 | 1 | 2 | 0 | 1 | 0 | 0 | 0 | 0 |
| 1976–77 | Rhode Island Reds | AHL | 52 | 1 | 3 | 4 | 20 | — | — | — | — | — |
| WHA totals | | | 258 | 10 | 43 | 53 | 180 | 20 | 2 | 4 | 6 | 18 |
| NHL totals | | | 147 | 3 | 21 | 24 | 93 | 11 | 0 | 0 | 0 | 2 |
