= 1974–75 St. Louis Blues season =

National Hockey League team season

1974–75 St. Louis Blues
- Division: 2nd Smythe
- Conference: 5th Campbell
- 1974–75 record: 35–31–14
- Home record: 23–13–4
- Road record: 12–18–10
- Goals for: 269
- Goals against: 267

Team information
- General manager: Gerry Ehman
- Coach: Garry Young
- Captain: Barclay Plager
- Alternate captains: Bob Plager; Garry Unger; Bill Collins
- Arena: St. Louis Arena

Team leaders
- Goals: Garry Unger (36)
- Assists: Garry Unger (44)
- Points: Garry Unger (80)
- Penalty minutes: Bob Gassoff (222)
- Wins: John Davidson (17)
- Goals against average: Yves Belanger (2.72)

The 1974–75 St. Louis Blues season was the St. Louis Blues' eighth season in the National Hockey League (NHL).

== Offseason ==
=== NHL draft ===
Below are listed the selections in the 1974 NHL amateur draft:

Pick #	Player	Position	Nationality	College/junior/club team
26	Bob Hess	Defence	Canada	New Westminster Bruins (WCHL)
43	Gordon Buynak	Defence	United States	Kingston Canadians (OMJHL)
79	Mike Zuke	Centre	Canada	Michigan Technological University (WCHA)
87	Don Wheldon	Defence	United States	London Knights (OMJHL)
97	Mike Thompson	Defence	Canada	Victoria Cougars (WCHL)
115	Terry Casey	Right wing	Canada	St. Catharines Black Hawks (OMJHL)
132	Rod Tordoff	Defence	Canada	Swift Current Broncos (WCHL)
149	Paul Touzin	Goaltender	Canada	Shawinigan Dynamos (QMJHL)
165	John Ahern	Defence	United States	Brown University (ECAC)
180	Mitch Babin	Centre	Canada	North Bay Trappers (OPJHL)
194	Doug Allan	Goaltender	Canada	New Westminster Bruins (WCHL)
^{Reference: "1974 NHL amateur draft hockeydraftcentral.com".}

== Regular season ==
=== Final standings ===
Smythe Division
		GP	W	L	T	GF	GA	DIFF	Pts
1	Vancouver Canucks	80	38	32	10	271	254	+17	86
2	St. Louis Blues	80	35	31	14	269	267	+2	84
3	Chicago Blackhawks	80	37	35	8	268	241	+27	82
4	Minnesota North Stars	80	23	50	7	221	341	−120	53
5	Kansas City Scouts	80	15	54	11	184	328	−144	41

=== Record vs. opponents ===
Smythe Division record vs. opponents

Vs. Campbell Conference

Vs. Wales Conference

Vs. Smythe Division

1974–75 NHL records
Team	CHI	KCS	MIN	STL	VAN	Total
Chicago	—	4–1–1	5–1	4–2	2–4	15–8–1
Kansas City	1–4–1	—	2–4	1–5	1–3–2	5–16–3
Minnesota	1–5	4–2	—	1–5	3–2–1	9–14–1
St. Louis	2–4	5–1	5–1	—	2–3–1	14–9–1
Vancouver	4–2	3–1–2	2–3–1	3–2–1	—	12–8–4

Vs. Patrick Division

1974–75 NHL records
Team	ATL	NYI	NYR	PHI	Total
Chicago	3–2	1–1–3	1–3–1	1–4	6–10–4
Kansas City	0–4–1	1–4	0–4–1	0–4–1	1–16–3
Minnesota	1–3–1	0–4–1	1–4	1–4	3–15–2
St. Louis	3–2	2–2–1	1–3–1	2–3	8–10–2
Vancouver	2–1–2	2–1–2	2–3	1–4	7–9–4

Vs. Adams Division

1974–75 NHL records
Team	BOS	BUF	CAL	TOR	Total
Chicago	2–2	1–3	3–1	2–2	8–8–0
Kansas City	1–2–1	0–4	2–1–1	1–2–1	4–9–3
Minnesota	0–3–1	1–3	3–1	1–3	5–10–1
St. Louis	2–1–1	0–2–2	2–1–1	0–2–2	4–6–6
Vancouver	1–3	2–2	4–0	3–1	10–6–0

Vs. Norris Division

1974–75 NHL records
Team	DET	LAK	MTL	PIT	WSH	Total
Chicago	2–1–1	2–2	0–3–1	1–2–1	3–1	8–9–3
Kansas City	1–3	1–3	0–4	0–2–2	3–1	5–13–2
Minnesota	2–0–2	0–4	0–4	1–3	3–0–1	6–11–3
St. Louis	3–0–1	0–3–1	2–1–1	1–1–2	4–0	10–5–5
Vancouver	3–1	1–1–2	0–4	1–3	4–0	9–9–2

== Schedule and results ==
1974–75 regular season
October

Game	Result	Date	Score	Opponent	Record
1	T	October 9, 1974	4–4	@ California Golden Seals (1974–75)	0–0–1
2	W	October 12, 1974	5–3	@ Vancouver Canucks (1974–75)	1–0–1
3	L	October 15, 1974	4–6	Vancouver Canucks (1974–75)	1–1–1
4	W	October 17, 1974	3–2	Montreal Canadiens (1974–75)	2–1–1
5	L	October 19, 1974	1–3	Chicago Black Hawks (1974–75)	2–2–1
6	L	October 23, 1974	1–5	@ New York Rangers (1974–75)	2–3–1
7	T	October 24, 1974	4–4	@ Boston Bruins (1974–75)	2–3–2
8	L	October 26, 1974	0–2	Buffalo Sabres (1974–75)	2–4–2
9	L	October 27, 1974	3–10	@ Chicago Black Hawks (1974–75)	2–5–2
10	T	October 31, 1974	1–1	@ Los Angeles Kings (1974–75)	2–5–3

November

Game	Result	Date	Score	Opponent	Record
11	W	November 2, 1974	9–0	Atlanta Flames (1974–75)	3–5–3
12	L	November 5, 1974	3–4	Los Angeles Kings (1974–75)	3–6–3
13	W	November 9, 1974	4–2	New York Islanders (1974–75)	4–6–3
14	W	November 12, 1974	4–3	Boston Bruins (1974–75)	5–6–3
15	L	November 13, 1974	3–5	@ Kansas City Scouts (1974–75)	5–7–3
16	W	November 16, 1974	5–3	Philadelphia Flyers (1974–75)	6–7–3
17	L	November 19, 1974	3–6	@ Vancouver Canucks (1974–75)	6–8–3
18	L	November 21, 1974	2–3	@ Minnesota North Stars (1974–75)	6–9–3
19	W	November 23, 1974	4–2	Detroit Red Wings (1974–75)	7–9–3
20	T	November 25, 1974	2–2	@ Toronto Maple Leafs (1974–75)	7–9–4
21	L	November 27, 1974	1–6	Vancouver Canucks (1974–75)	7–10–4
22	L	November 30, 1974	1–7	@ Montreal Canadiens (1974–75)	7–11–4

December

Game	Result	Date	Score	Opponent	Record
23	T	December 1, 1974	4–4	@ New York Rangers (1974–75)	7–11–5
24	W	December 3, 1974	5–1	California Golden Seals (1974–75)	8–11–5
25	W	December 7, 1974	8–2	Washington Capitals (1974–75)	9–11–5
26	W	December 8, 1974	3–1	@ Washington Capitals (1974–75)	10–11–5
27	L	December 10, 1974	2–3	@ New York Islanders (1974–75)	10–12–5
28	W	December 12, 1974	4–3	@ Detroit Red Wings (1974–75)	11–12–5
29	W	December 14, 1974	6–2	New York Rangers (1974–75)	12–12–5
30	L	December 15, 1974	2–7	@ Philadelphia Flyers (1974–75)	12–13–5
31	W	December 17, 1974	8–4	New York Islanders (1974–75)	13–13–5
32	L	December 20, 1974	2–6	@ Atlanta Flames (1974–75)	13–14–5
33	W	December 21, 1974	6–4	Kansas City Scouts (1974–75)	14–14–5
34	T	December 26, 1974	2–2	@ Pittsburgh Penguins (1974–75)	14–14–6
35	W	December 28, 1974	4–2	Minnesota North Stars (1974–75)	15–14–6
36	L	December 29, 1974	2–5	@ Chicago Black Hawks (1974–75)	15–15–6

January

Game	Result	Date	Score	Opponent	Record
37	W	January 2, 1975	2–1	@ Kansas City Scouts (1974–75)	16–15–6
38	L	January 4, 1975	1–4	Atlanta Flames (1974–75)	16–16–6
39	L	January 5, 1975	2–4	@ Buffalo Sabres (1974–75)	16–17–6
40	L	January 7, 1975	2–3	California Golden Seals (1974–75)	16–18–6
41	L	January 11, 1975	3–5	New York Rangers (1974–75)	16–19–6
42	W	January 12, 1975	2–1	@ Detroit Red Wings (1974–75)	17–19–6
43	T	January 14, 1975	3–3	@ New York Islanders (1974–75)	17–19–7
44	L	January 15, 1975	1–4	Toronto Maple Leafs (1974–75)	17–20–7
45	W	January 18, 1975	5–4	Minnesota North Stars (1974–75)	18–20–7
46	L	January 23, 1975	2–7	Philadelphia Flyers (1974–75)	18–21–7
47	L	January 25, 1975	1–4	Chicago Black Hawks (1974–75)	18–22–7
48	T	January 28, 1975	4–4	Detroit Red Wings (1974–75)	18–22–8
49	W	January 31, 1975	4–2	@ Atlanta Flames (1974–75)	19–22–8

February

Game	Result	Date	Score	Opponent	Record
50	T	February 1, 1975	4–4	Pittsburgh Penguins (1974–75)	19–22–9
51	L	February 4, 1975	3–5	Toronto Maple Leafs (1974–75)	19–23–9
52	W	February 7, 1975	5–0	Kansas City Scouts (1974–75)	20–23–9
53	T	February 8, 1975	3–3	@ Toronto Maple Leafs (1974–75)	20–23–10
54	W	February 11, 1975	3–1	Philadelphia Flyers (1974–75)	21–23–10
55	W	February 15, 1975	7–1	Washington Capitals (1974–75)	22–23–10
56	T	February 16, 1975	4–4	@ Buffalo Sabres (1974–75)	22–23–11
57	T	February 18, 1975	4–4	Montreal Canadiens (1974–75)	22–23–12
58	L	February 22, 1975	2–3	@ Pittsburgh Penguins (1974–75)	22–24–12
59	W	February 23, 1975	7–2	@ Washington Capitals (1974–75)	23–24–12
60	L	February 25, 1975	0–3	@ New York Islanders (1974–75)	23–25–12
61	L	February 26, 1975	1–5	@ New York Rangers (1974–75)	23–26–12

March

Game	Result	Date	Score	Opponent	Record
62	W	March 1, 1975	4–3	@ Montreal Canadiens (1974–75)	24–26–12
63	L	March 2, 1975	2–4	@ Philadelphia Flyers (1974–75)	24–27–12
64	W	March 5, 1975	5–2	Vancouver Canucks (1974–75)	25–27–12
65	T	March 8, 1975	3–3	Buffalo Sabres (1974–75)	25–27–13
66	W	March 9, 1975	5–4	@ Minnesota North Stars (1974–75)	26–27–13
67	W	March 11, 1975	3–0	Atlanta Flames (1974–75)	27–27–13
68	W	March 12, 1975	4–3	@ Chicago Black Hawks (1974–75)	28–27–13
69	W	March 14, 1975	6–1	Kansas City Scouts (1974–75)	29–27–13
70	L	March 16, 1975	2–7	@ Boston Bruins (1974–75)	29–28–13
71	W	March 18, 1975	5–2	Pittsburgh Penguins (1974–75)	30–28–13
72	L	March 20, 1975	2–3	@ Los Angeles Kings (1974–75)	30–29–13
73	L	March 21, 1975	4–7	@ California Golden Seals (1974–75)	30–30–13
74	T	March 23, 1975	3–3	@ Vancouver Canucks (1974–75)	30–30–14
75	W	March 26, 1975	3–1	Boston Bruins (1974–75)	31–30–14
76	W	March 29, 1975	2–1	Minnesota North Stars (1974–75)	32–30–14

April

Game	Result	Date	Score	Opponent	Record
77	W	April 1, 1975	7–3	@ Minnesota North Stars (1974–75)	33–30–14
78	L	April 2, 1975	2–5	Los Angeles Kings (1974–75)	33–31–14
79	W	April 5, 1975	4–3	Chicago Black Hawks (1974–75)	34–31–14
80	W	April 6, 1975	3–2	@ Kansas City Scouts (1974–75)	35–31–14

Legend: Win (2 points) Loss (0 points) Tie (1 point)

== Player statistics ==
=== Regular season ===
Scoring

Player	Pos	GP	G	A	Pts	PIM	+/-	PPG	SHG	GWG
Garry Unger	C	80	36	44	80	123	−1	10	0	8
Pierre Plante	RW	80	34	32	66	125	16	4	0	4
Wayne Merrick	C	76	28	37	65	57	29	2	0	3
Chuck Lefley	LW	57	23	26	49	24	6	5	2	3
Larry Sacharuk	D	76	20	22	42	24	−9	11	0	1
Garnet Bailey	LW	49	15	26	41	113	−4	4	0	1
Bob Hess	D	76	9	30	39	58	7	4	0	1
Bill Collins	RW	70	22	15	37	34	4	2	2	2
Floyd Thomson	LW	77	9	27	36	106	13	0	0	0
Doug Palazzari	C	73	14	17	31	19	8	0	1	1
Red Berenson	C	44	12	19	31	12	−7	4	1	1
Barclay Plager	D	76	4	24	28	96	20	0	0	1
Claude Larose	RW	56	10	17	27	38	7	0	0	1
Bob Gassoff	D	60	4	14	18	222	11	1	0	1
Craig Patrick	RW	43	6	9	15	6	6	0	0	2
Bob Plager	D	73	1	14	15	53	10	0	0	0
Ken Richardson	C	21	5	7	12	12	4	1	0	1
Brian Ogilvie	C	20	5	5	10	4	−4	0	0	2
Bernie Lukowich	RW	26	4	5	9	2	4	2	0	2
Denis Dupere	LW	22	3	6	9	8	4	1	0	0
Don Awrey	D	20	0	8	8	4	−8	0	0	0
Rick Wilson	D	76	2	5	7	83	12	0	0	0
Stan Gilbertson	LW	22	1	4	5	4	−5	0	0	0
Murray Kuntz	LW	7	1	2	3	0	6	0	0	0
Bob Stumpf	RW/D	7	1	1	2	16	2	0	0	0
Bruce Affleck	D	13	0	2	2	4	7	0	0	0
John Davidson	G	40	0	2	2	8	0	0	0	0
Dave Gardner	C	8	0	2	2	0	−3	0	0	0
Phil Roberto	RW	7	0	2	2	2	−3	0	0	0
Yves Belanger	G	11	0	1	1	0	0	0	0	0
Chris Evans	D	20	0	1	1	2	−1	0	0	0
Jack Borotsik	C	1	0	0	0	0	0	0	0	0
Gord Buynak	D	4	0	0	0	2	3	0	0	0
Eddie Johnston	G	30	0	0	0	0	0	0	0	0
Jim McCrimmon	D	2	0	0	0	0	0	0	0	0
Frank Spring	RW	3	0	0	0	0	−1	0	0	0
Don Wheldon	D	2	0	0	0	0	0	0	0	0

Goaltending

Player	MIN	GP	W	L	T	GA	GAA	SO
John Davidson	2360	40	17	15	7	144	3.66	0
Eddie Johnston	1800	30	12	13	5	93	3.10	2
Yves Belanger	640	11	6	3	2	29	2.72	1
Team:	4800	80	35	31	14	266	3.32	3

=== Playoffs ===
Scoring

Player	Pos	GP	G	A	Pts	PIM	PPG	SHG	GWG
Garry Unger	C	2	1	3	4	6	0	0	0
Claude Larose	RW	2	1	1	2	0	0	0	0
Wayne Merrick	C	2	1	1	2	0	1	0	0
Larry Sacharuk	D	2	1	1	2	2	0	0	0
Red Berenson	C	2	1	0	1	0	1	0	0
Bill Collins	RW	2	1	0	1	0	0	0	0
Craig Patrick	RW	2	0	1	1	0	0	0	0
Barclay Plager	D	2	0	1	1	14	0	0	0
Floyd Thomson	LW	2	0	1	1	0	0	0	0
Bruce Affleck	D	1	0	0	0	0	0	0	0
John Davidson	G	1	0	0	0	0	0	0	0
Bob Gassoff	D	2	0	0	0	0	0	0	0
Bob Hess	D	1	0	0	0	2	0	0	0
Eddie Johnston	G	1	0	0	0	0	0	0	0
Chuck Lefley	LW	2	0	0	0	2	0	0	0
Bernie Lukowich	RW	2	0	0	0	0	0	0	0
Doug Palazzari	C	2	0	0	0	0	0	0	0
Bob Plager	D	2	0	0	0	20	0	0	0
Pierre Plante	RW	2	0	0	0	8	0	0	0
Rick Wilson	D	2	0	0	0	0	0	0	0

Goaltending

Player	MIN	GP	W	L	GA	GAA	SO
John Davidson	60	1	0	1	4	4.00	0
Eddie Johnston	60	1	0	1	5	5.00	0
Team:	120	2	0	2	9	4.50	0

Note:

Pos = Position;GP = Games played; G = Goals; A = Assists; Pts = Points; PIM = Penalty minutes; +/- = Plus/minus; PPG = Power-play goals; SHG = Short-handed goals; GWG = Game-winning goals
Pos = Position;GP = Games played; Min, TOI = Minutes played; W = Wins; L = Losses; T,T/OT = Ties; OTL = Overtime losses; GA = Goals-against; GAA = Goals-against average; SO = Shutouts; SA = Shots against; SV = Shots saved;SV% = Save percentage;
