= Adams Cup (ice hockey) =

Central Professional Hockey League championship trophy

The Adams Cup was awarded annually (from 1964 to 1984) to the championship team in Central Professional Hockey League (CPHL).

The CPHL was a top-tier minor professional league that operated in the United States from 1963 to 1984 (from 1968 forward as the "Central Hockey League"). It was owned and operated by the National Hockey League. The CPHL's championship trophy was called the Adams Cup in honor of the CPHL's founding president Jack Adams.

== Adams Cup champions ==
- 1964 — Omaha Knights
- 1965 — St. Paul Rangers
- 1966 — Oklahoma City Blazers
- 1967 — Oklahoma City Blazers
- 1968 — Tulsa Oilers
- 1969 — Dallas Black Hawks
- 1970 — Omaha Knights
- 1971 — Omaha Knights
- 1972 — Dallas Black Hawks
- 1973 — Omaha Knights
- 1974 — Dallas Black Hawks
- 1975 — Salt Lake Golden Eagles
- 1976 — Tulsa Oilers
- 1977 — Kansas City Blues
- 1978 — Fort Worth Texans
- 1979 — Dallas Black Hawks
- 1980 — Salt Lake Golden Eagles
- 1981 — Salt Lake Golden Eagles
- 1982 — Indianapolis Checkers
- 1983 — Indianapolis Checkers
- 1984 — (Tulsa) Oilers ‡

‡‡ Oilers team was left without a home after its owners in Tulsa went into receivership; played the last two months of the season and all playoff games as a road team, with salaries and expenses paid by the league.
