= Roger Lafreniere =

Canadian ice hockey player

- Born: July 24, 1942 Montreal, Quebec, Canada
- Died: June 22, 2009 (aged 66) North Bay, Ontario, Canada
- Height: 6 ft 0 in (183 cm)
- Weight: 190 lb (86 kg; 13 st 8 lb)
- Position: Defense
- Shot: Left
- Played for: Detroit Red Wings; St. Louis Blues
- Playing career: 1962–1976

Roger Joseph Lafrenière (July 24, 1942 — June 22, 2009) was a Canadian ice hockey defenceman who played 13 games in the National Hockey League (NHL) with the Detroit Red Wings and St. Louis Blues between 1963 and 1972. The rest of his career, which lasted from 1962 to 1976, was mainly spent in the minor leagues. He won the CAHA's Memorial Cup in 1962 with the Hamilton Red Wings of the OHA and the WHL's Lester Patrick Cup in 1972 with the Denver Spurs.

Lafrenière was the father of NHL player Jason Lafreniere.

== Career statistics ==
=== Regular season and playoffs ===
			Regular season					Playoffs
Season	Team	League	GP	G	A	Pts	PIM	GP	G	A	Pts	PIM
1961–62	Hamilton Red Wings	OHA	48	4	19	23	76	10	2	4	6	15
1961–62	Hamilton Red Wings	M-Cup	—	—	—	—	—	14	0	8	8	16
1962–63	Pittsburgh Hornets	AHL	65	2	14	16	123	—	—	—	—	—
1962–63	Detroit Red Wings	NHL	3	0	0	0	0	—	—	—	—	—
1963–64	Cincinnati Wings	CPHL	66	3	24	27	112	—	—	—	—	—
1964–65	Memphis Wings	CPHL	2	0	1	1	0	—	—	—	—	—
1964–65	Providence Reds	AHL	57	4	13	17	96	—	—	—	—	—
1965–66	Buffalo Bisons	AHL	72	1	16	17	76	—	—	—	—	—
1966–67	Buffalo Bisons	AHL	71	2	16	18	72	—	—	—	—	—
1967–68	Buffalo Bisons	AHL	5	0	1	1	0	—	—	—	—	—
1967–68	Omaha Knights	CPHL	65	10	25	35	129	—	—	—	—	—
1968–69	Omaha Knights	CHL	70	14	29	43	122	7	1	5	6	16
1969–70	Denver Spurs	WHL	61	4	19	23	85	—	—	—	—	—
1970–71	Denver Spurs	WHL	58	4	13	17	47	5	0	1	1	12
1971–72	Denver Spurs	WHL	71	10	24	34	87	9	0	1	1	8
1972–73	Denver Spurs	WHL	53	9	20	29	100	5	0	2	2	8
1972–73	St. Louis Blues	NHL	10	0	0	0	0	—	—	—	—	—
1973–74	San Diego Gulls	WHL	70	9	14	23	75	4	1	0	1	0
1974–75	Roanoke Valley Rebels	SHL	29	2	18	20	24	—	—	—	—	—
1975–76	EHC Basel	NLB	13	4	8	12	42	—	—	—	—	—
AHL totals			270	9	60	69	367	—	—	—	—	—
WHL totals			313	36	90	126	394	23	1	4	5	28
NHL totals			13	0	0	0	4	—	—	—	—	—
