= Bryan Campbell =

Canadian ice hockey player (born 1944)

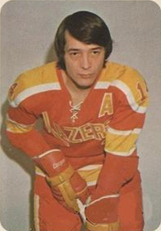
- Born: March 27, 1944 (age 82) Sudbury, Ontario, Canada
- Height: 6 ft 0 in (183 cm)
- Weight: 168 lb (76 kg; 12 st 0 lb)
- Position: Centre
- Shot: Left
- Played for: Los Angeles Kings; Chicago Black Hawks; Philadelphia Blazers; Vancouver Blazers; Cincinnati Stingers; Indianapolis Racers; Edmonton Oilers
- NHL draft: Undrafted
- Playing career: 1964–1978

Bryan Albert Campbell (born March 27, 1944) is a Canadian former professional ice hockey forward who played 260 games in the National Hockey League and 433 games in the World Hockey Association between 1967 and 1978. He played for the Los Angeles Kings, Chicago Black Hawks, Vancouver Blazers, Cincinnati Stingers, Indianapolis Racers, and Edmonton Oilers. He retired to Deerfield Beach, Florida, with his wife Jo-anne.

== Career statistics ==
=== Regular season and playoffs ===
			Regular season					Playoffs
Season	Team	League	GP	G	A	Pts	PIM	GP	G	A	Pts	PIM
1961–62	Hamilton Red Wings	OHA	23	5	3	8	0	9	0	0	0	0
1961–62	Hamilton Red Wings	M-Cup	—	—	—	—	—	9	1	3	4	2
1962–63	Hamilton Red Wings	OHA	49	21	40	61	19	5	2	2	4	2
1963–64	Hamilton Red Wings	OHA	39	13	25	38	32	9	1	4	5	4
1963–64	Cincinnati Wings	CPHL	5	1	3	4	2	—	—	—	—	—
1963–64	Edmonton Oil Kings	CAHL	—	—	—	—	—	5	2	0	2	0
1963–64	Edmonton Oil Kings	M-Cup	—	—	—	—	—	5	9	8	17	2
1964–65	Memphis Wings	CPHL	69	23	39	62	54	—	—	—	—	—
1965–66	Memphis Wings	CPHL	56	24	31	55	32	—	—	—	—	—
1966–67	Omaha Knights	CPHL	65	24	42	68	46	12	1	9	10	4
1967–68	Los Angeles Kings	NHL	44	6	15	21	16	6	2	1	3	0
1968–69	Los Angeles Kings	NHL	18	2	1	3	4	—	—	—	—	—
1968–69	Springfield Kings	AHL	53	27	28	55	24	—	—	—	—	—
1969–70	Springfield Kings	AHL	15	7	14	21	2	—	—	—	—	—
1969–70	Los Angeles Kings	NHL	31	4	4	8	4	—	—	—	—	—
1969–70	Chicago Black Hawks	NHL	14	1	1	2	2	8	1	2	3	0
1970–71	Chicago Black Hawks	NHL	78	17	37	54	26	4	0	1	1	0
1971–72	Chicago Black Hawks	NHL	75	5	13	18	22	4	0	0	0	2
1972–73	Philadelphia Blazers	WHA	75	25	48	73	85	3	0	1	1	8
1973–74	Vancouver Blazers	WHA	76	27	62	89	50	—	—	—	—	—
1974–75	Vancouver Blazers	WHA	78	29	34	63	24	—	—	—	—	—
1975–76	Cincinnati Stingers	WHA	77	22	50	72	24	—	—	—	—	—
1976–77	Indianapolis Racers	WHA	8	1	4	5	6	—	—	—	—	—
1976–77	Edmonton Oilers	WHA	66	12	42	54	18	5	3	1	4	0
1977–78	Edmonton Oilers	WHA	53	7	13	20	12	—	—	—	—	—
WHA totals			433	123	253	376	219	8	3	2	5	8
NHL totals			260	35	71	106	74	22	3	4	7	2
