= Harrison Gray (ice hockey) =

Canadian ice hockey player (1941–2022)

- Born: September 5, 1941 Calgary, Alberta, Canada
- Died: August 19, 2022 (aged 80) Strathmore, Alberta, Canada
- Height: 5 ft 11 in (180 cm)
- Weight: 165 lb (75 kg; 11 st 11 lb)
- Position: Goaltender
- Caught: Left
- Played for: Detroit Red Wings
- Playing career: 1961–1969

Harrison Leroy Gray (September 5, 1941 – August 19, 2022) was a Canadian professional ice hockey goaltender who played in the National Hockey League with the Detroit Red Wings during the 1963–64 season. The rest of his career, which lasted from 1961 to 1970, was spent in the minor leagues.

== Playing career ==
Gray played for only 40 minutes of one NHL game, the November 28, 1963 match against the Montreal Canadiens. He received credit for the loss after allowing 5 goals on 31 shots in a 7–3 loss at Detroit. Gray took over for the injured Terry Sawchuck.

From 1964 to 1969, Gray played another 318 games in the Eastern Hockey League before retiring from professional hockey.

Prior to playing for the Detroit Red Wings, Gray played 15 games in the Western Hockey League with the Edmonton Flyers, and 3 games with the Cincinnati Wings in the Central Hockey League. Gray died in Strathmore, Alberta in 2022 at the age of 80.

== Career statistics ==
=== Regular season and playoffs ===
			Regular season									Playoffs
Season	Team	League	GP	W	L	T	MIN	GA	SO	GAA	SV%	GP	W	L	MIN	GA	SO	GAA	SV%
1959–60	Edmonton Oil Kings	CAHL	—	—	—	—	—	—	—	—	—	—	—	—	—	—	—	—	—
1959–60	Edmonton Oil Kings	M-Cup	—	—	—	—	—	—	—	—	—	3	0	3	180	25	0	8.33	—
1960–61	Edmonton Oil Kings	CAHL	—	—	—	—	—	—	—	—	—	—	—	—	—	—	—	—	—
1961–62	Edmonton Flyers	WHL	1	0	0	0	20	0	0	0.00	1.000	—	—	—	—	—	—	—	—
1961–62	Edmonton Oil Kings	CAHL	—	—	—	—	—	—	—	—	—	—	—	—	—	—	—	—	—
1961–62	Edmonton Oil Kings	M-Cup	—	—	—	—	—	—	—	—	—	21	14	7	1271	56	3	2.64	—
1962–63	Edmonton Flyers	WHL	14	0	13	1	840	87	0	6.21	—	—	—	—	—	—	—	—	—
1963–64	Detroit Red Wings	NHL	1	0	1	0	40	5	0	7.50	.839	—	—	—	—	—	—	—	—
1963–64	Cincinnati Wings	CHL	3	1	1	1	180	10	0	3.33	—	—	—	—	—	—	—	—	—
1964–65	Knoxville Knights	EHL	55	—	—	—	3300	208	2	3.78	—	10	5	5	600	37	0	3.70	—
1965–66	Knoxville Knights	EHL	28	14	14	0	1680	118	0	4.21	—	—	—	—	—	—	—	—	—
1965–66	New Haven Blades	EHL	37	—	—	—	2220	170	1	4.59	—	3	0	3	180	15	0	5.00	—
1966–67	Florida Rockets	EHL	72	27	43	2	4320	314	2	4.36	—	—	—	—	—	—	—	—	—
1967–68	Florida Rockets	EHL	72	30	34	8	4320	286	3	3.97	—	5	2	3	300	20	0	4.00	—
1968–69	Jacksonville Rockets	EHL	54	—	—	—	3240	226	1	4.18	—	1	1	0	60	2	0	2.00	—
1969–70	Drumheller Miners	ASHL	17	—	—	—	1020	72	1	4.24	—	—	—	—	—	—	—	—	—
NHL totals			1	0	1	0	40	5	0	7.50	.839	—	—	—	—	—	—	—	—

== See also ==
- List of players who played only one game in the NHL
