= Jimmy Peters Jr. =

Canadian ice hockey player

- Born: June 20, 1944 (age 80); Montreal, Quebec, Canada
- Height: 6 ft 2 in (188 cm)
- Weight: 185 lb (84 kg; 13 st 3 lb)
- Position: Centre
- Shot: Left
- Played for: Detroit Red Wings; Los Angeles Kings
- Playing career: 1964–1976

James Stephen Peters Jr. (born June 20, 1944) is a Canadian retired ice hockey left wing who played 309 games in the National Hockey League with the Detroit Red Wings and Los Angeles Kings between 1964 and 1974. After his playing career he worked as a coach in the university level for several years. His father, Jimmy Peters Sr., also played in the NHL.

== Biography ==
Born in Montreal, Quebec, Peters started his NHL career with the Detroit Red Wings in the 1964–65 season. He would also play for the Los Angeles Kings between 1968 and 1975, during which time he also played for several American Hockey League, Central Hockey League, and Western Hockey League teams. He would retire after the playing the 1975–76 season in the CHL with the Fort Worth Texans.

After his playing career, Peters served as head coach at Northern Arizona University, and as an assistant at Rensselaer Polytechnic Institute.

== Career statistics ==
=== Regular season and playoffs ===
			Regular season					Playoffs
Season	Team	League	GP	G	A	Pts	PIM	GP	G	A	Pts	PIM
1961–62	Hamilton Red Wings	OHA	42	4	9	13	4	10	2	2	4	7
1961–62	Hamilton Red Wings	M-Cup	—	—	—	—	—	13	2	6	8	0
1962–63	Hamilton Red Wings	OHA	50	9	24	33	12	5	3	3	6	4
1963–64	Hamilton Red Wings	OHA	55	31	45	76	6	—	—	—	—	—
1963–64	Cincinnati Wings	CHL	5	3	0	3	0	—	—	—	—	—
1964–65	Hamilton Red Wings	OHA	51	36	65	101	12	—	—	—	—	—
1964–65	Memphis Wings	CHL	8	0	1	1	2	—	—	—	—	—
1964–65	Detroit Red Wings	NHL	1	0	0	0	0	—	—	—	—	—
1965–66	Memphis Wings	CHL	64	15	28	43	2	—	—	—	—	—
1965–66	Detroit Red Wings	NHL	6	1	1	2	0	—	—	—	—	—
1966–67	Pittsburgh Hornets	AHL	16	2	5	7	0	—	—	—	—	—
1966–67	Memphis Wings	CHL	51	6	19	25	10	7	1	2	3	2
1966–67	Detroit Red Wings	NHL	2	0	0	0	0	—	—	—	—	—
1967–68	Fort Worth Wings	CHL	20	10	18	28	13	—	—	—	—	—
1967–68	Detroit Red Wings	NHL	45	5	6	11	8	—	—	—	—	—
1968–69	Los Angeles Kings	NHL	76	10	15	25	28	11	0	2	2	2
1969–70	Los Angeles Kings	NHL	74	15	9	24	10	—	—	—	—	—
1970–71	Springfield Kings	AHL	26	5	14	19	9	—	—	—	—	—
1970–71	Denver Spurs	WHL	42	8	22	30	6	5	2	2	4	2
1971–72	Seattle Totems	WHL	63	16	36	52	8	—	—	—	—	—
1972–73	Los Angeles Kings	NHL	77	4	5	9	0	—	—	—	—	—
1973–74	Los Angeles Kings	NHL	25	2	0	2	0	—	—	—	—	—
1973–74	Portland Buckaroos	WHL	42	7	15	22	15	10	4	3	7	0
1974–75	Springfield Indians	AHL	69	24	37	61	10	15	6	0	6	4
1974–75	Los Angeles Kings	NHL	3	0	0	0	0	—	—	—	—	—
1975–76	Fort Worth Texans	CHL	76	16	30	46	17	—	—	—	—	—
NHL totals			307	37	36	73	46	11	0	2	2	4

== Head coaching record ==
Statistics overview
Season	Team	Overall	Conference	Standing	Postseason
Northern Arizona Lumberjacks Independent (1981–1984)
1981–82	Northern Arizona	6–18–0			
1982–83	Northern Arizona	17–11–1			
1983–84	Northern Arizona	21–6–0			
Northern Arizona:		44–35–1			
Total:		44–35–1			
National champion Postseason invitational champion Conference regular season champion Conference regular season and conference tournament champion Division regular season champion Division regular season and conference tournament champion Conference tournament champion
