= Bob Champoux =

Canadian ice hockey player

- Born: December 2, 1942 (age 82); Saint-Hilaire, Quebec, Canada
- Height: 5 ft 10 in (178 cm)
- Weight: 175 lb (79 kg; 12 st 7 lb)
- Position: Goaltender
- Caught: Left
- Played for: Detroit Red Wings; California Golden Seals
- Playing career: 1963–1977

Robert Joseph Champoux (born December 2, 1942) is a Canadian retired professional ice hockey goaltender. He made his National Hockey League (NHL) debut with the Detroit Red Wings on March 29, 1964 when he replaced an injured Terry Sawchuk in a 5–4 victory at Chicago Stadium that evened the semifinal series against the Blackhawks at one game apiece. After Sawchuk returned to play all the remaining matches in the Red Wings' Stanley Cup playoff run, Champoux did not play in another NHL contest until nine years later when he registered a 2–11–3 record with the California Golden Seals, the worst team in the league during the 1973–74 season. He spent the remainder of his professional hockey career in the minor leagues.

Champoux worked as a computer programmer after retiring from professional hockey.

== Career statistics ==
=== Regular season and playoffs ===
			Regular season									Playoffs
Season	Team	League	GP	W	L	T	MIN	GA	SO	GAA	SV%	GP	W	L	MIN	GA	SO	GAA	SV%
1961–62	Montreal Junior Canadiens	OHA	8	—	—	—	480	25	0	3.13	—	—	—	—	—	—	—	—	—
1962–63	Saint-Jérôme Alouettes	QJHL	—	—	—	—	—	—	—	—	—	—	—	—	—	—	—	—	—
1963–64	Cincinnati Wings	CHL	60	10	44	5	3610	337	1	5.60	—	—	—	—	—	—	—	—	—
1963–64	Detroit Red Wings	NHL	—	—	—	—	—	—	—	—	—	1	1	0	55	4	0	4.36	.778
1964–65	Memphis Wings	CHL	4	1	3	0	240	16	0	4.00	—	—	—	—	—	—	—	—	—
1964–65	Minneapolis Bruins	CHL	1	1	0	0	60	0	1	0.00	—	—	—	—	—	—	—	—	—
1964–65	Pittsburgh Hornets	AHL	13	4	8	0	740	50	1	4.05	—	—	—	—	—	—	—	—	—
1965–66	Pittsburgh Hornets	AHL	8	4	3	0	412	21	1	3.06	—	—	—	—	—	—	—	—	—
1965–66	Memphis Wings	CHL	1	0	1	0	60	6	0	6.00	—	—	—	—	—	—	—	—	—
1966–67	San Diego Gulls	WHL	20	7	11	1	1140	72	0	3.86	—	—	—	—	—	—	—	—	—
1967–68	San Diego Gulls	WHL	33	15	16	2	1957	111	0	3.40	—	5	3	2	306	12	0	2.35	—
1968–69	San Diego Gulls	WHL	37	13	15	6	2048	123	3	3.60	—	7	3	4	399	21	0	3.16	—
1969–70	San Diego Gulls	WHL	1	0	1	0	60	4	0	4.00	—	—	—	—	—	—	—	—	—
1969–70	Kansas City Blues	CHL	2	2	0	0	120	6	0	3.00	—	—	—	—	—	—	—	—	—
1969–70	Dallas Black Hawks	CHL	25	8	16	1	1460	89	2	3.66	—	—	—	—	—	—	—	—	—
1970–71	San Diego Gulls	WHL	2	0	1	1	120	6	0	3.00	—	—	—	—	—	—	—	—	—
1970–71	Jacksonville Rockets	EHL	21	—	—	—	1260	112	0	5.33	—	—	—	—	—	—	—	—	—
1972–73	San Diego Gulls	WHL	24	8	9	5	1339	74	1	3.31	—	4	2	1	214	10	1	2.80	—
1973–74	San Diego Gulls	WHL	2	0	2	0	120	8	0	4.00	—	—	—	—	—	—	—	—	—
1973–74	California Golden Seals	NHL	17	2	11	3	922	80	0	5.21	.848	—	—	—	—	—	—	—	—
1973–74	Salt Lake Golden Eagles	WHL	44	23	16	3	2586	139	2	3.23	—	—	—	—	—	—	—	—	—
1974–75	Syracuse Blazers	NAHL	3	2	1	0	171	8	1	2.80	—	—	—	—	—	—	—	—	—
1974–75	Winston-Salem Polar Twins	SHL	22	—	—	—	1287	91	0	4.24	—	7	3	4	422	30	0	4.27	—
1975–76	Winston-Salem Polar Twins	SHL	47	18	20	9	2770	161	0	3.49	—	4	0	4	214	18	0	5.05	—
1976–77	Winston-Salem Polar Twins	SHL	23	—	—	—	1269	78	1	3.69	—	—	—	—	—	—	—	—	—
NHL totals			17	2	11	3	922	80	0	5.21	.848	1	1	0	55	4	0	4.36	.778
