= Bob Wall (ice hockey) =

Canadian ice hockey player

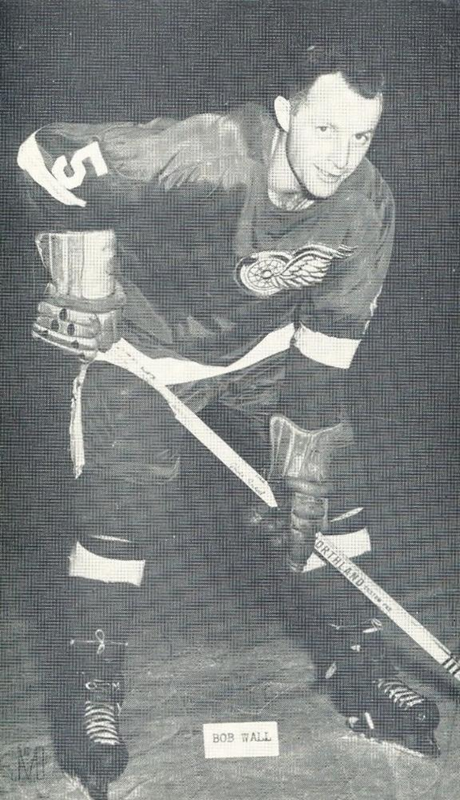
- Wall in 1960s postcard
- Born: December 1, 1942 (age 83) Elgin Mills, Ontario, Canada
- Height: 5 ft 10 in (178 cm)
- Weight: 186 lb (84 kg; 13 st 4 lb)
- Position: Defence
- Shot: Left
- Played for: Detroit Red Wings; Los Angeles Kings; St. Louis Blues; Edmonton Oilers; San Diego Mariners
- Playing career: 1962–1976

Robert James Albert Wall (born December 1, 1942) is a Canadian former professional ice hockey defenceman. Wall played for several teams in the National Hockey League (NHL). Wall was the first team captain of the Los Angeles Kings.

== Playing career ==
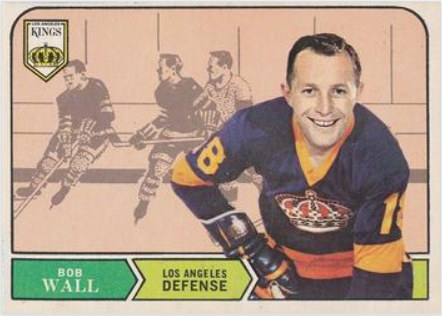
1968-69 card of Robert "Bob" Wall for Los Angeles Kings

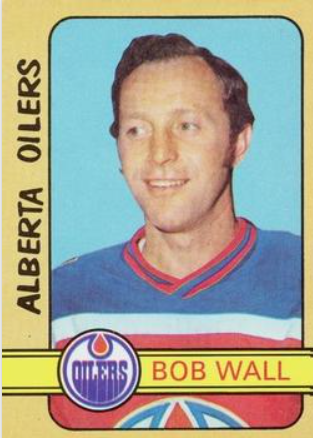
1972-73 card of Wall for Edmonton Oilers of the WHA

Wall was born in Elgin Mills, Ontario. Wall played junior hockey in the Ontario Hockey Association. While playing junior hockey, Wall was part of the 1962 Memorial Cup champion Hamilton Red Wings.

The majority of his 14 professional seasons were split between the NHL and the World Hockey Association.

== Career statistics ==
=== Regular season and playoffs ===
			Regular season					Playoffs
Season	Team	League	GP	G	A	Pts	PIM	GP	G	A	Pts	PIM
1958–59	Montreal Snowdon Ponsards	MMJHL	—	—	—	—	—	—	—	—	—	—
1959–60	Hamilton Tiger Cubs	OHA	48	3	11	14	44	—	—	—	—	—
1960–61	Hamilton Red Wings	OHA	48	2	8	10	30	12	1	3	4	29
1961–62	Hamilton Red Wings	OHA	44	7	22	29	28	10	3	3	6	26
1961–62	Hamilton Red Wings	M-Cup	—	—	—	—	—	14	2	13	15	6
1962–63	Hamilton Red Wings	OHA	36	5	30	35	27	5	0	6	6	2
1962–63	Pittsburgh Hornets	AHL	3	0	2	2	2	—	—	—	—	—
1962–63	Edmonton Flyers	WHL	7	0	0	0	0	—	—	—	—	—
1963–64	Cincinnati Wings	CPHL	59	10	20	30	16	—	—	—	—	—
1963–64	Quebec Aces	AHL	8	1	2	3	4	—	—	—	—	—
1963–64	Omaha Knights	CPHL	—	—	—	—	—	10	1	7	8	4
1964–65	Detroit Red Wings	NHL	1	0	0	0	0	1	0	0	0	0
1964–65	Memphis Wings	CPHL	70	8	38	46	83	—	—	—	—	—
1965–66	Detroit Red Wings	NHL	8	1	1	2	8	6	0	0	0	2
1965–66	Pittsburgh Hornets	AHL	63	10	35	45	26	3	0	1	1	8
1966–67	Detroit Red Wings	NHL	31	2	2	4	26	—	—	—	—	—
1966–67	Pittsburgh Hornets	AHL	41	7	25	32	29	9	2	2	4	4
1967–68	Los Angeles Kings	NHL	71	5	18	23	66	7	0	1	1	0
1968–69	Los Angeles Kings	NHL	71	13	13	26	16	8	0	2	2	0
1969–70	Los Angeles Kings	NHL	70	5	13	18	26	—	—	—	—	—
1970–71	St. Louis Blues	NHL	25	2	4	6	4	—	—	—	—	—
1970–71	Kansas City Blues	CHL	18	0	7	7	4	—	—	—	—	—
1971–72	Detroit Red Wings	NHL	45	2	4	6	9	—	—	—	—	—
1971–72	Tidewater Wings	AHL	17	2	4	6	12	—	—	—	—	—
1972–73	Alberta Oilers	WHA	78	16	29	45	20	—	—	—	—	—
1973–74	Edmonton Oilers	WHA	74	6	31	37	46	5	0	2	2	2
1974–75	San Diego Mariners	WHA	33	0	9	9	15	10	0	3	3	2
1975–76	San Diego Mariners	WHA	68	1	20	21	32	11	1	3	4	4
WHA totals			253	23	89	112	113	26	1	8	9	8
NHL totals			322	30	55	85	155	22	0	3	3	2

Preceded by Position created	Los Angeles Kings captain 1967–69	Succeeded by Larry Cahan
