= Ron Harris (ice hockey) =

Canadian ice hockey player

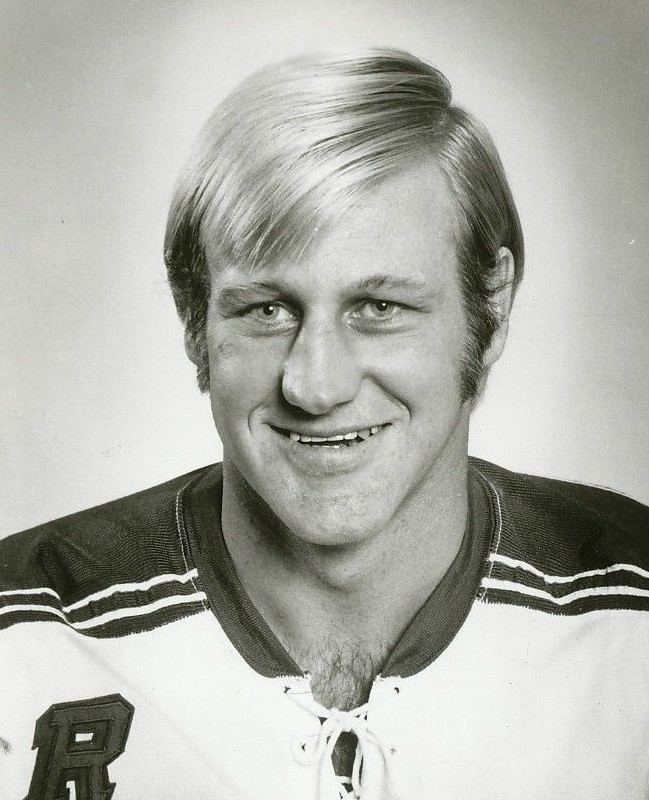
- Born: June 30, 1942 (age 83) Verdun, Quebec, Canada
- Height: 5 ft 9 in (175 cm)
- Weight: 175 lb (79 kg; 12 st 7 lb)
- Position: Defence
- Shot: Right
- Played for: Detroit Red Wings; Oakland Seals; Atlanta Flames; New York Rangers
- Playing career: 1962–1976

Ronald Thomas Harris (born June 30, 1942) is a Canadian former professional ice hockey player who played 476 games in the National Hockey League. He played for the Detroit Red Wings, Oakland Seals, Atlanta Flames, and New York Rangers.

On January 13, 1968, Harris, playing with the Oakland Seals against the Minnesota North Stars, was involved in the accident that caused the death of Bill Masterton. Harris is still plagued with memories of the incident to this day and has conducted only one interview on this subject, with the St. Paul Pioneer Press in 2003, in which he stated, "It bothers you the rest of your life. It wasn't dirty and it wasn't meant to happen that way. Still, it's very hard because I made the play. It's always in the back of my mind."

After Harris retired from the NHL, he began getting involved in other areas of the game, coaching the Windsor Spitfires and Spokane Flyers at the major junior level, and later working as an assistant coach for the Quebec Nordiques in the NHL.

== Career statistics ==
			Regular season					Playoffs
Season	Team	League	GP	G	A	Pts	PIM	GP	G	A	Pts	PIM
1960–61	Hamilton Red Wings	OHA-Jr.	47	1	9	10	63	12	0	0	0	45
1961–62	Hamilton Red Wings	OHA-Jr.	50	7	29	36	85	10	3	2	5	25
1962–63	Detroit Red Wings	NHL	1	0	1	1	0	—	—	—	—	—
1962–63	Pittsburgh Hornets	AHL	62	3	18	21	88	—	—	—	—	—
1963–64	Detroit Red Wings	NHL	3	0	0	0	7	—	—	—	—	—
1963–64	Cincinnati Wings	CPHL	66	4	21	25	129	—	—	—	—	—
1964–65	Memphis Wings	CPHL	70	18	18	36	75	—	—	—	—	—
1964–65	Pittsburgh Hornets	AHL	—	—	—	—	—	1	0	0	0	0
1965–66	San Francisco Seals	WHL-Sr.	54	12	16	28	74	7	2	1	3	15
1966–67	California Seals	WHL-Sr.	31	8	9	17	40	6	1	0	1	12
1967–68	California/Oakland Seals	NHL	54	4	6	10	60	—	—	—	—	—
1968–69	Detroit Red Wings	NHL	73	3	13	16	91	—	—	—	—	—
1969–70	Detroit Red Wings	NHL	72	2	19	21	99	4	0	0	0	8
1970–71	Detroit Red Wings	NHL	42	2	8	10	65	—	—	—	—	—
1971–72	Detroit Red Wings	NHL	61	1	10	11	80	—	—	—	—	—
1972–73	Atlanta Flames	NHL	24	2	4	6	8	—	—	—	—	—
1972–73	New York Rangers	NHL	46	3	10	13	17	10	0	3	3	2
1973–74	New York Rangers	NHL	63	2	12	14	25	11	3	0	3	14
1974–75	New York Rangers	NHL	34	1	7	8	22	3	1	0	1	9
1975–76	New York Rangers	NHL	3	0	1	1	0	—	—	—	—	—
NHL totals			476	20	91	111	474	28	4	3	7	33
