= Glen Sather =

Canadian ice hockey player, coach and executive

OC Glen Sather
- Hockey Hall of Fame, 1997 (Builder)
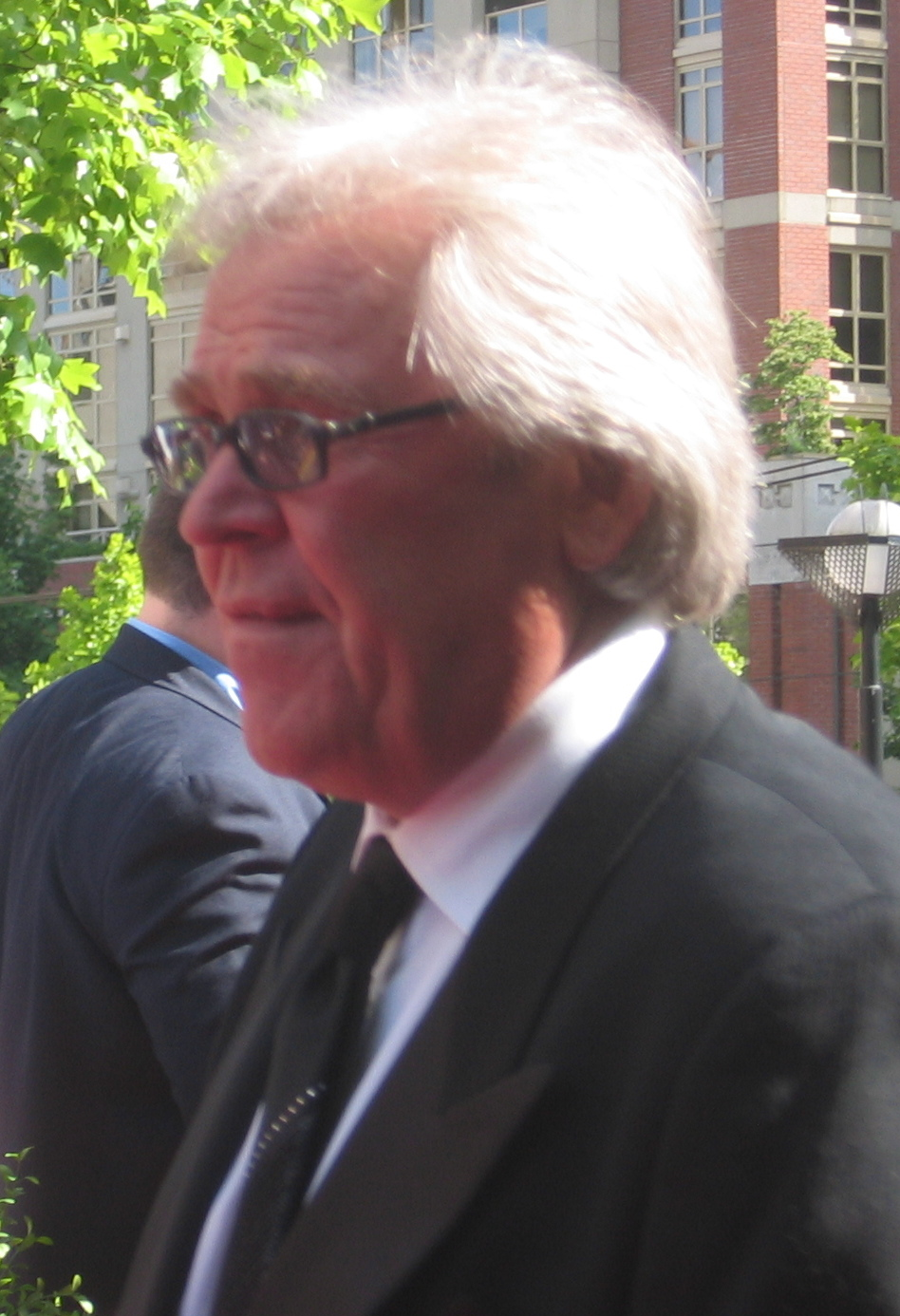
- Sather at the 2006 NHL Awards
- Born: September 2, 1943 (age 83) High River, Alberta, Canada
- Height: 5 ft 11 in (180 cm)
- Weight: 180 lb (82 kg; 12 st 12 lb)
- Position: Left wing
- Shot: Left
- Played for: Boston Bruins; Pittsburgh Penguins; New York Rangers; St. Louis Blues; Montreal Canadiens; Minnesota North Stars; Edmonton Oilers
- Coached for: Edmonton Oilers; New York Rangers
- Playing career: 1966–1976
- Coaching career: 1976–2004

Glen Cameron Sather (born September 2, 1943) is a Canadian former ice hockey player, coach, and current executive. He is the current senior advisor and alternate governor of the New York Rangers of the National Hockey League (NHL). He was the Rangers' general manager until stepping down on July 1, 2015, and then served as their president until April 4, 2019. He stepped down from his advisory role with the Rangers on June 26, 2024.

He is known for coaching the Edmonton Oilers to four Stanley Cup victories during the 1980s. He played a key role in attracting talented players, including Wayne Gretzky, who helped make the Oilers a hockey dynasty at that time. Gretzky, who became "the most dominant player in the history of the game," credits Sather, along with Walter Gretzky, his father, as his most important mentors.

Outside the NHL, Sather was instrumental in building Canadian national teams for the 1984 Canada Cup (tournament champions), the 1994 Ice Hockey World Championship (gold Medal winners) and 1996 World Cup of Hockey (finalists). Before coaching, Sather was a professional ice hockey left winger in the WHA and NHL, playing for several teams over 10 years.

Sather, together with Brian Burke and Darryl Porter owned the Tri-City Americans of the WHL until 2005 when the team was sold in order to prevent the team from moving. Sather, Burke, and Porter along with Moray Keith and Jim Bond who held a minority stake, were granted a WHL expansion team starting in the 2006-2007 season in Chilliwack, British Columbia which became the Chilliwack Bruins. The team was owned by this group until 2011, when the team was sold and became the Victoria Royals.

Sather was born in High River, Alberta but grew up in Wainwright, Alberta. Sather resides in Rye, New York during the season and Palm Springs, California in the off-season, but also has a home in Banff, Alberta. He was inducted into the Hockey Hall of Fame in 1997. His nickname is "Slats".

== Background and early career ==
Sather played three junior seasons starting in 1961 with the Edmonton Oil Kings. His professional career started in 1964 with the CPHL Memphis Wings and Oklahoma City Blazers, joining the Bruins at the end of the 1966–67 season and playing in 5 games.

== Professional playing career ==
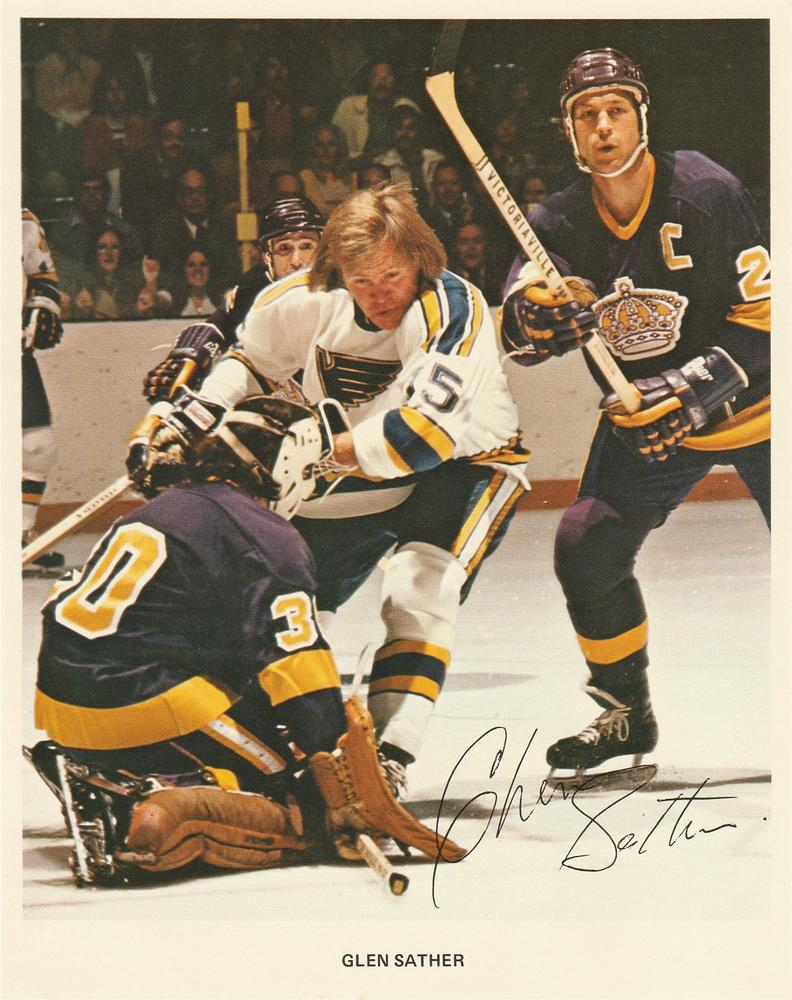
Sather in action shot during 1973-74 season for St. Louis Blues

Sather played ten full seasons in the National Hockey League (NHL) and another with the Edmonton Oilers of the World Hockey Association (WHA). He played 739 regular season games as a pro, scoring 99–146–245 and earning 801 minutes in penalties. In the playoffs, he added 77 games played and scored 2–6–8 with 88PIM. His career as a player ended after the 1976–77 WHA season.

== Post-playing career ==
=== Edmonton Oilers ===
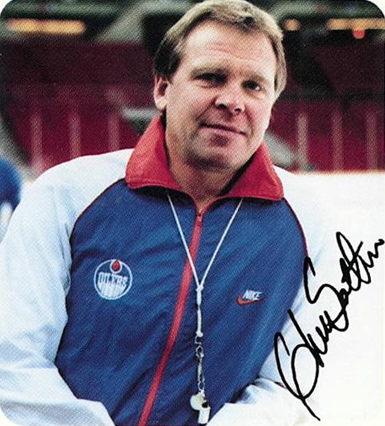
1986 card of Sather with Edmonton Oilers

Sather was named player-coach of the Oilers with 18 games remaining in the 1976-77 World Hockey Association season. In his first game as player-coach, the Oilers defeated the Winnipeg Jets 5–4, with Sather himself scoring a goal 1:11 into the game. He retired as a player after that season but remained as head coach and was the face of the organization for the next quarter-century. Sather stayed on as head coach when the Oilers joined the NHL in 1979–80.

In 1978, then-Oilers owner Peter Pocklington came to Sather and asked him whether he should take advantage of an opportunity to acquire Wayne Gretzky. Sather replied, "Whatever you have to do, get him." This was considered a risky proposition in 1978, as many scouts and hockey pundits, notably Howie Meeker, considered Gretzky too small, and unlikely to ever make it in the pro ranks. Upon acquiring Gretzky, Sather allowed him to live with his family.

In 1979, the Edmonton Oilers were absorbed into the NHL. After taking them to the first round of the playoffs in their inaugural season, Sather was promoted to president and general manager, and named Bryan Watson as head coach. On the advice of Barry Fraser, his chief scout, Sather selected Paul Coffey in the first round, Jari Kurri in the fourth, and Andy Moog in the seventh. After a 4–9–5 record to start the 1980–81 season, Sather stepped back behind the bench and demoted Watson to an assistant (Watson retired after the season). While his record was only 25–26–11 the rest of the way, the young Oilers caught fire late in the season and swept the heavily favoured Montreal Canadiens in the opening round of the playoffs. It was a signal of what was to come. Again on the advice of Fraser, Sather selected Grant Fuhr in the first round and Steve Smith in the sixth round of the 1981 draft. The 1981–82 season saw the Oilers charge out of the gate as never before. They scored an NHL-record 417 goals, paced by Gretzky's 92 goals and 212 points. They rocketed to second place in the league behind only the New York Islanders but were upended in the first round by the upstart Los Angeles Kings.

This was the start of a tremendous run for the Oilers, who made it to the 1983 Final (losing to the Islanders) and then winning the Stanley Cup in five of the next seven seasons. The team made the playoffs with Sather as the sole head coach from 1979–80 until 1984–85. In 1985, Sather named top assistant John Muckler as associate head coach and began splitting most coaching duties with Muckler. Sather won the Jack Adams Trophy in 1985–86 as the NHL's coach of the year. In the 1988 offseason, Gretzky was traded to the Los Angeles Kings. The Oilers finished the season third in the Smythe Division and then were eliminated by Gretzky's Kings in the first round of the playoffs in seven games. Afterward, Sather relinquished his title of head coach to Muckler but remained general manager of the Oilers.

For the 1989–90 season, the Oilers returned to the Final where they again faced the Boston Bruins, winning in five games for their fifth Stanley Cup.

While the Oilers remained competitive in the first couple seasons of the 1990s, it was obvious they were no longer the powerhouse they had once been, as they last won the division title in 1986–87. This was mainly because key players such as Mark Messier, Jari Kurri, and Esa Tikkanen left to seek higher salaries elsewhere, caused in part by the Gretzky trade in 1988 as well as Paul Coffey's departure in 1987. It has been argued that the high turnover came about from Pocklington's cost-cutting moves in the late 1980s and early 1990s.

The Oilers' decline was precipitated by poor scouting and drafting in the 1980s. This was largely overlooked during their glory years since their stellar records resulted in them drafting fairly late and Sather was fairly adept at making trades to fill in the pieces. However, the lack of depth in the minor-league system finally caught up with them when the last veterans from the dynasty years left town. This left the Oilers so bereft of talent that Sather was forced to rush many prospects to Edmonton before they had sufficient time to develop. While the Oilers dropped to third in the Smythe Division in 1991 and 1992, they had enough heft to make it to the Conference Final both years. The bottom fell out in 1993 when the Oilers missed the playoffs for the first time in their NHL history. Of the 17 players that Sather chose in the first round from 1982 to 2000, only Jeff Beukeboom in 1983, Jason Arnott in 1993 and Ryan Smyth in 1994 turned out to be successful for the Oilers. This deficiency was particularly crucial as the Oilers' precarious financial situation in the 1990s kept them from paying their top players enough to keep them in Edmonton, and also locked them out of the market for top free agents. The Oilers returned to the playoffs in 1997 and would not miss the postseason again under Sather's management. In 1997 and 1998, they managed first-round upsets of the Dallas Stars and Colorado Avalanche, respectively, backstopped by goaltender Curtis Joseph.

The heavily-leveraged Pocklington was finally forced to sell the team in 1998, which nearly resulted in the franchise being moved to Houston, Texas by Rockets owner Leslie Alexander. However, a local consortium stepped in and made a successful bid to keep the Oilers in Edmonton. Sather agreed to remain general manager but was unable to retain Joseph who signed as a free agent with the Toronto Maple Leafs for 1998–99, and the Oilers were eliminated in the opening round of the playoffs by the Stars from 1999 to 2001. Sather left the Oilers organization in 2000 and was succeeded as general manager by outgoing head coach Kevin Lowe. However, the deficiencies in player development under Sather hampered the Oilers for several years to come. Since 1991–92, they have only finished with 90 or more points nine times.

=== New York Rangers ===
For the 2000-01 season, Sather joined the Rangers to become their president and general manager, after Neil Smith was fired along with head coach John Muckler in March 2000. Like Smith, Sather's Rangers relied heavily on aging veterans acquired through expensive free agency. Messier returned to the Rangers, Theoren Fleury joined the Rangers after spending most of his career with the Calgary Flames and Eric Lindros was traded to the Rangers by the Flyers. The Rangers also acquired Pavel Bure late in 2001–02 from the Florida Panthers. Approaching the 2004–05 NHL lockout, they also acquired Alexei Kovalev, Jaromir Jagr, Martin Rucinsky, and Bobby Holik. However despite much fanfare, none of the acquisitions helped them obtain a playoff spot. Towards the end of the 2003–04 season, Sather traded away Brian Leetch, Kovalev, Rucinsky, and Nedved. Ending up, Sather's initial tenure as general manager saw the Rangers miss the playoffs for a further four straight seasons, contributing to franchise-record seven-year postseason drought from 1998 to 2005.

Sather hired Bryan Trottier as head coach in 2002. The former Islanders' great, hated by the Rangers' fans, was fired 54 games into the 2002–03 season. Sather took over as head coach and remained as head coach into the 2003–04 season, eventually relinquishing the job to assistant coach Tom Renney; his record as Rangers coach was 33–39–11–7 over 90 games. That pushed his NHL career win total to 497, 19th all-time.

Some good, young players were also drafted during his tenure as the Rangers general manager, such as Henrik Lundqvist, Brandon Dubinsky, Ryan Callahan, Marc Staal, Derek Stepan, Chris Kreider, and Carl Hagelin. The team greatly improved after the lockout under Renney, making the Stanley Cup playoffs four consecutive years. After the Rangers lost in the second round of the 2007 and 2008 playoffs and were struggling to make the playoffs in 2009, Sather fired Renney and replaced him with John Tortorella. The Rangers made the playoffs as the seventh seed but ultimately lost in the first round to the Washington Capitals in seven games. The Rangers failed to qualify for the playoffs in 2010, resulting in some fans holding a rally asking the team to relieve Sather of his position as general manager. The Rangers later advanced to the Stanley Cup Final in 2014 with Tortorella's replacement, Alain Vigneault. He stepped down as the general manager on July 1, 2015, and resigned from his position as president on April 4, 2019, announcing his decision to take on the roles of senior advisor and alternate governor.

== Head coaching record ==
Team	Year	Regular season							Postseason			
Team	Year	G	W	L	T	OTL	Pts	Finish	W	L	Win %	Result
EDM	1976–77	18	9	7	2	—	(20)	4th in West	1	4	.200	Lost in Quarterfinals (HOU)
EDM	1977–78	80	38	39	3	—	79	5th in West	1	4	.200	Lost in Quarterfinals (NEW)
EDM	1978–79	80	48	30	2	—	98	1st in West	6	7	.462	Lost in Final (WPG)
EDM	1979–80	80	28	39	13	—	69	4th in Smythe	0	3	.000	Lost in Preliminary Round (PHI)
EDM	1980–81	62	25	26	11	—	74	third in Smythe	5	4	.556	Lost in Quarterfinals (NYI)
EDM	1981–82	80	48	17	15	—	111	1st in Smythe	2	3	.400	Lost in Division Semifinals (LAK)
EDM	1982–83	80	47	21	12	—	106	1st in Smythe	11	5	.688	Lost in Stanley Cup Final (NYI)
EDM	1983–84	80	57	18	5	—	119	1st in Smythe	15	4	.789	Won Stanley Cup (NYI)
EDM	1984–85	80	49	20	11	—	109	1st in Smythe	15	3	.833	Won Stanley Cup (PHI)
EDM	1985–86	80	56	17	7	—	119	1st in Smythe	6	4	.600	Lost in Division Final (CGY)
EDM	1986–87	80	50	24	6	—	106	1st in Smythe	16	5	.762	Won Stanley Cup (PHI)
EDM	1987–88	80	44	25	11	—	99	second in Smythe	16	2	.889	Won Stanley Cup (BOS)
EDM	1988–89	80	38	34	8	—	84	third in Smythe	3	4	.429	Lost in Division Semifinals (LAK)
EDM	1993–94	60	22	27	11	—	(55)	6th in Pacific	—	—	—	Missed playoffs
EDM total		842	464	268	110	0			97	52	.651	13 playoff appearances 4 Stanley Cups
NYR	2002–03	28	11	10	4	3	(29)	4th in Atlantic	—	—	—	Missed playoffs
NYR	2003–04	62	22	29	7	4	(55)	4th in Atlantic	—	—	—	Missed playoffs
NYR total		90	33	39	11	7			—	—	—	0 playoff appearances
Total		1,062	583	376	126	7			97	52	.651	13 playoff appearances 4 Stanley Cups

== Career statistics ==
			Regular season					Playoffs
Season	Team	League	GP	G	A	Pts	PIM	GP	G	A	Pts	PIM
1961–62	Edmonton Oil Kings	CAHL	—	—	—	—	—	—	—	—	—	—
1961–62	Edmonton Oil Kings	M-Cup	—	—	—	—	—	19	5	5	10	14
1962–63	Edmonton Oil Kings	CAHL	—	—	—	—	—	—	—	—	—	—
1962–63	Edmonton Oil Kings	M-Cup	—	—	—	—	—	20	9	13	22	26
1963–64	Edmonton Oil Kings	CAHL	40	31	34	65	30	1	0	0	0	0
1963–64	Edmonton Oil Kings	M-Cup	—	—	—	—	—	19	8	17	25	30
1964–65	Memphis Wings	CPHL	69	19	29	48	98	—	—	—	—	—
1965–66	Oklahoma City Blazers	CPHL	64	13	12	25	76	9	4	4	8	14
1966–67	Oklahoma City Blazers	CPHL	57	14	19	33	147	11	2	6	8	24
1966–67	Boston Bruins	NHL	5	0	0	0	0	—	—	—	—	—
1967–68	Boston Bruins	NHL	65	8	12	20	34	3	0	0	0	0
1968–69	Boston Bruins	NHL	76	4	11	15	67	10	0	0	0	18
1969–70	Pittsburgh Penguins	NHL	76	12	14	26	114	10	0	2	2	17
1970–71	Pittsburgh Penguins	NHL	46	8	3	11	96	—	—	—	—	—
1970–71	New York Rangers	NHL	31	2	0	2	52	13	0	1	1	18
1971–72	New York Rangers	NHL	76	5	9	14	77	16	0	1	1	22
1972–73	New York Rangers	NHL	77	11	15	26	64	9	0	0	0	7
1973–74	New York Rangers	NHL	2	0	0	0	0	—	—	—	—	—
1973–74	St. Louis Blues	NHL	69	15	29	44	82	—	—	—	—	—
1974–75	Montreal Canadiens	NHL	63	6	10	16	44	11	1	1	2	4
1975–76	Minnesota North Stars	NHL	72	9	10	19	94	—	—	—	—	—
1976–77	Edmonton Oilers	WHA	81	19	34	53	77	5	1	1	2	2
NHL totals			658	80	113	193	724	72	1	5	6	86

== Career accomplishments ==
- Sather stands nineteenth in regular-season coaching wins all-time in the NHL. Teams for which he served as head coach for the full season had winning records in 8 out of 11 seasons and missed the playoffs only once. With the Oilers, his teams finished first in the regular season three times and also set numerous scoring records.
- As head coach of the Oilers, he won 89 playoff games and lost 37 en route to four Stanley Cups in five Finals appearances.
- Stanley Cup champion as head coach: 1984, 1985, 1987, 1988. Edmonton Oilers.
- Stanley Cup champion as president and general manager: 1984, 1985, 1987, 1988, 1990. Edmonton Oilers.
- The Glen Sather Sports Medicine Clinic in Edmonton, Alberta, was named in his honor.
- Outside the NHL, Sather was instrumental in building Canadian national teams for the 1984 Canada Cup (tournament champions), the 1994 Ice Hockey World Championship (gold Medal winners) and 1996 World Cup of Hockey (finalists).
- Sather was inducted into the Alberta Sports Hall of Fame & Museum in 1996.
- Sather was inducted into the Hockey Hall of Fame in 1997.
- In 2010, he was elected as an inaugural inductee into the World Hockey Association Hall of Fame in the "Legends of the Game" category.
- On December 11, 2015, Sather's banner was lifted to the rafters of Rexall Place before a regular season game between the New York Rangers and Edmonton Oilers.

Preceded by Al Hamilton	Edmonton Oilers captain 1976–1977	Succeeded by Paul Shmyr
Preceded by Bep Guidolin	Head coach of the Edmonton Oilers; 1977–1980	Succeeded by Bryan Watson
Preceded by Bryan Watson	Head coach of the Edmonton Oilers; 1980–1989	Succeeded by John Muckler
Preceded by Mike Keenan	Winner of the Jack Adams Award; 1986	Succeeded by Jacques Demers
Preceded by Ted Green	Head coach of the Edmonton Oilers; 1993–1994	Succeeded by George Burnett
Preceded by Bryan Trottier	Head coach of the New York Rangers; 2003–2004	Succeeded by Tom Renney
Preceded by Larry Gordon	General manager of the Edmonton Oilers; 1980–2000	Succeeded by Kevin Lowe
Preceded by Neil Smith	General manager of the New York Rangers; 2000–2015	Succeeded by Jeff Gorton
