= Jack McIntyre (ice hockey) =

Canadian ice hockey player

- Born: September 8, 1930 Brussels, Ontario, Canada
- Died: March 15, 1998 (aged 67)
- Height: 5 ft 11 in (180 cm)
- Weight: 170 lb (77 kg; 12 st 2 lb)
- Position: Left wing
- Shot: Left
- Played for: Detroit Red Wings; Chicago Black Hawks; Boston Bruins
- Playing career: 1950–1969

John Archibald "Jack" McIntyre (September 8, 1930 in Brussels, Ontario – March 15, 1998) was a Canadian ice hockey player. He played in the National Hockey League between 1950 and 1960.

== Playing career ==
McIntyre played 499 National Hockey League games as an offensive defenceman for the Boston Bruins, Chicago Black Hawks and Detroit Red Wings. Following his retirement he coached the London Nationals (later Knights) in the Ontario Hockey League.

In his early professional career Jack played left wing for the Boston Bruins as number 18.

== Career statistics ==
=== Regular season and playoffs ===
			Regular season					Playoffs
Season	Team	League	GP	G	A	Pts	PIM	GP	G	A	Pts	PIM
1947–48	St. Catharines Teepees	OHA	31	4	4	8	49	3	2	2	4	6
1948–49	St. Catharines Teepees	OHA	46	14	16	30	64	5	0	3	3	10
1949–50	St. Catharines Teepees	OHA	39	30	26	56	21	5	5	3	8	0
1949–50	Boston Bruins	NHL	1	0	1	1	0	—	—	—	—	—
1949–50	Boston Olympics	EAHL	15	4	5	9	6	5	2	1	3	2
1950–51	Hershey Bears	AHL	64	28	36	64	19	6	1	0	1	0
1950–51	Boston Bruins	NHL	—	—	—	—	—	2	0	0	0	0
1951–52	Boston Bruins	NHL	52	12	19	31	18	7	1	2	3	2
1951–52	Hershey Bears	AHL	5	1	2	3	2	—	—	—	—	—
1952–53	Boston Bruins	NHL	70	7	15	22	31	10	4	2	6	2
1953–54	Hershey Bears	AHL	44	15	17	32	99	—	—	—	—	—
1953–54	Chicago Black Hawks	NHL	23	8	3	11	4	—	—	—	—	—
1954–55	Chicago Black Hawks	NHL	65	16	13	29	40	—	—	—	—	—
1955–56	Chicago Black Hawks	NHL	46	10	5	15	14	—	—	—	—	—
1955–56	Buffalo Bisons	AHL	27	17	19	36	10	5	0	5	5	17
1956–57	Chicago Black Hawks	NHL	70	18	14	32	32	—	—	—	—	—
1957–58	Chicago Black Hawks	NHL	27	0	4	4	10	—	—	—	—	—
1957–58	Detroit Red Wings	NHL	41	15	7	22	4	4	1	1	2	0
1958–59	Detroit Red Wings	NHL	55	15	14	29	14	—	—	—	—	—
1958–59	Hershey Bears	AHL	10	7	3	10	2	—	—	—	—	—
1959–60	Detroit Red Wings	NHL	49	8	7	15	6	6	1	1	2	0
1959–60	Hershey Bears	AHL	17	7	9	16	4	—	—	—	—	—
1960–61	Hershey Bears	AHL	72	32	25	57	32	8	4	2	6	0
1961–62	Pittsburgh Hornets	AHL	67	25	23	48	32	—	—	—	—	—
1962–63	Edmonton Flyers	WHL	53	25	25	50	20	3	1	2	3	2
1962–63	Pittsburgh Hornets	AHL	8	0	1	1	6	—	—	—	—	—
1963–64	Cincinnati Wings	CHL	12	0	4	4	12	—	—	—	—	—
1963–64	Guelph Regals	OHA Sr	20	10	27	37	2	5	3	1	4	6
1964–65	Guelph Regals	OHA Sr	29	22	20	42	10	7	5	4	9	4
1965–66	Guelph Regals	OHA Sr	1	0	0	0	0	10	5	3	8	6
1966–67	Johnstown Jets	EHL	5	0	1	1	4	—	—	—	—	—
1968–69	Woodstock Athletics	OHA Sr	33	11	15	26	22	—	—	—	—	—
NHL totals			499	109	102	211	173	29	7	6	13	4
