= Gerry Abel =

American ice hockey player (1944–2021)

- Born: December 25, 1944 Rochester, Michigan, U.S.
- Died: July 2, 2021 (aged 76) Detroit, Michigan, U.S.
- Height: 6 ft 2 in (188 cm)
- Weight: 168 lb (76 kg; 12 st 0 lb)
- Position: Left wing
- Shot: Left
- Played for: Detroit Red Wings
- Playing career: 1965–1968

Gerald Scott Abel (December 25, 1944 – July 2, 2021) was an American professional ice hockey left winger. He is the son of Hockey Hall of Fame member Sid Abel and the uncle of former goaltender Brent Johnson. He played one game in the National Hockey League during the 1966–67 season, with the Detroit Red Wings on March 8, 1967 against the New York Rangers. The rest of his career, which lasted from 1965 to 1968, was spent in the minor leagues.

== Playing career ==
Abel played junior hockey for the Hamilton Red Wings signing with the Detroit Red Wings. His father Sid was the head coach of the Red Wings at the time and upon signing, Gerry was quoted as saying "If I could be half as good as my dad, I'd be happy". In the end though, Abel played in only one National Hockey League game for the Red Wings during the 1966–67 NHL season, spending much of the season playing for the Memphis Wings as well as two games for the American Hockey League's Pittsburgh Hornets. After another season with Memphis, Abel retired from hockey.

== Career statistics ==
=== Regular season and playoffs ===
			Regular season					Playoffs
Season	Team	League	GP	G	A	Pts	PIM	GP	G	A	Pts	PIM
1962–63	Detroit Junior Red Wings	OJAHL	—	—	—	—	—	—	—	—	—	—
1964–65	Detroit Junior Red Wings	OJAHL	—	—	—	—	—	—	—	—	—	—
1964–65	Hamilton Red Wings	OHA	27	3	13	16	31	—	—	—	—	—
1964–65	Memphis Wings	CHL	8	2	2	4	0	—	—	—	—	—
1965–66	Memphis Wings	CHL	12	0	1	1	0	—	—	—	—	—
1966–67	Detroit Red Wings	NHL	1	0	0	0	0	—	—	—	—	—
1966–67	Pittsburgh Hornets	AHL	2	0	2	2	0	—	—	—	—	—
1966–67	Memphis Wings	CHL	44	2	9	11	20	6	0	1	1	2
1967–68	Fort Worth Wings	CHL	52	3	14	17	35	6	1	2	3	2
CHL totals			116	7	26	33	55	12	1	3	4	4
NHL totals			1	0	0	0	0	—	—	—	—	—

== See also ==
- List of players who played only one game in the NHL
