= Howie Menard =

Canadian ice hockey player

Howie Ménard
- Born: April 28, 1942 (age 82); Timmins, Ontario, Canada
- Height: 5 ft 8 in (173 cm)
- Weight: 168 lb (76 kg; 12 st 0 lb)
- Position: Centre
- Shot: Right
- Played for: Detroit Red Wings; Los Angeles Kings; Chicago Blackhawks; Oakland Seals
- Playing career: 1962–1977

Howard Hubert Ménard (born April 28, 1942) is a Canadian former professional ice hockey player who played 151 games in the National Hockey League. He played for the Detroit Red Wings, Los Angeles Kings, Chicago Black Hawks and the Oakland Seals between 1964 and 1970. Most of his career, which lasted from 1962 to 1977, was spent in the minor American Hockey League (AHL). Howie is the brother of Hillary Menard.

Howie continues to hold the record for most points in a playoff game (7) in the AHL Calder Cup, with four goals and three assists against the Cleveland Barons on April 12, 1972, while playing for the Baltimore Clippers. Only two players have tied his record since that time.

Howie was the Captain of the 1961-62 Memorial Cup Champions, Hamilton Red Wings.

== Career statistics ==
=== Regular season and playoffs ===
			Regular season					Playoffs
Season	Team	League	GP	G	A	Pts	PIM	GP	G	A	Pts	PIM
1959–60	Toronto Marlboros	OHA	48	21	29	50	63	4	1	1	2	2
1960–61	Toronto Marlboros	OHA	21	11	9	20	34	—	—	—	—	—
1960–61	Hamilton Red Wings	OHA	24	7	7	14	29	12	4	6	10	35
1961–62	Hamilton Red Wings	OHA	48	12	32	44	87	10	6	4	10	30
1961–62	Hamilton Red Wings	M-Cup	—	—	—	—	—	14	9	13	22	18
1962–63	Pittsburgh Hornets	AHL	69	16	29	45	62	—	—	—	—	—
1963–64	Cincinnati Wings	CPHL	69	25	37	62	75	—	—	—	—	—
1963–64	Detroit Red Wings	NHL	3	0	0	0	0	—	—	—	—	—
1964–65	Memphis Wings	CPHL	61	9	33	42	66	—	—	—	—	—
1965–66	Springfield Indians	AHL	71	15	42	57	42	6	3	2	5	10
1966–67	Springfield Indians	AHL	68	25	39	64	52	—	—	—	—	—
1967–68	Springfield Kings	AHL	37	18	33	51	33	—	—	—	—	—
1967–68	Los Angeles Kings	NHL	35	9	15	24	32	7	0	5	5	24
1968–69	Springfield Kings	AHL	20	3	15	18	18	—	—	—	—	—
1968–69	Los Angeles Kings	NHL	56	10	17	27	31	11	3	2	5	12
1969–70	Chicago Black Hawks	NHL	19	2	3	5	8	—	—	—	—	—
1969–70	Oakland Seals	NHL	38	2	7	9	16	1	0	0	0	0
1970–71	Providence Reds	AHL	59	10	21	31	75	1	0	0	0	2
1971–72	Baltimore Clippers	AHL	73	26	30	56	79	18	5	13	18	28
1972–73	Salt Lake Golden Eagles	WHL	59	12	38	50	46	9	4	3	7	12
1973–74	Baltimore Clippers	AHL	73	42	39	81	66	9	3	3	6	13
1974–75	Baltimore Clippers	AHL	43	14	18	32	44	—	—	—	—	—
1974–75	Providence Reds	AHL	10	1	2	3	20	3	0	0	0	0
1975–76	Baltimore Clippers	AHL	38	7	11	18	30	—	—	—	—	—
1975–76	Whitby Warriors	OHA Sr	23	11	8	19	14	—	—	—	—	—
1976–77	Whitby Warriors	OHA Sr	2	0	1	1	0	—	—	—	—	—
AHL totals			561	177	279	456	521	37	11	18	29	53
NHL totals			151	23	42	65	87	19	3	7	10	36
