= Nick Libett =

Canadian retired ice hockey player (born 1945)

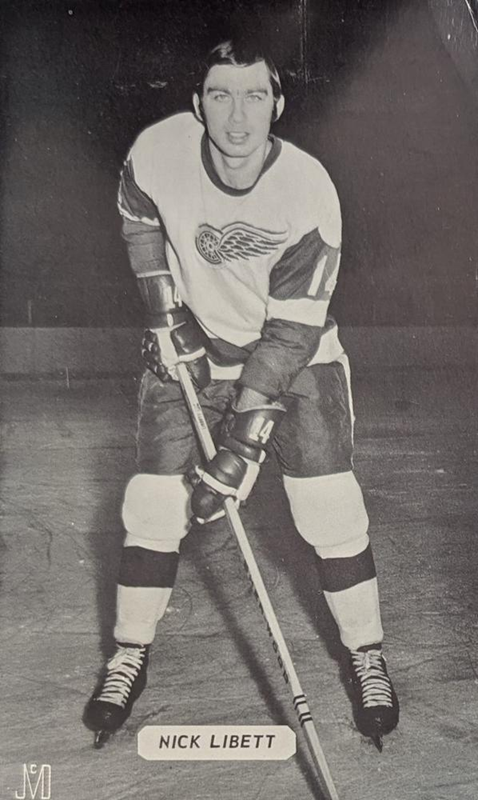
- Born: December 9, 1945 (age 80) Stratford, Ontario, Canada
- Height: 6 ft 1 in (185 cm)
- Weight: 175 lb (79 kg; 12 st 7 lb)
- Position: Left wing
- Shot: Left
- Played for: Detroit Red Wings; Pittsburgh Penguins
- National team: Canada
- Playing career: 1963–1981

Nicholas Lynn Libett (/ˈlɪbɪt/ LIB-it; born December 9, 1945) is a Canadian retired ice hockey player. He played 12 years in the National Hockey League (NHL) as a left winger for the Detroit Red Wings (1967–79) and Pittsburgh Penguins (1979–1981). In 982 career games, he scored 504 points, and was captain of the Red Wings on two occasions during the 1970s.

== Early years ==
Libett was born in 1945 at Stratford, Ontario. He played youth hockey with the Stratford Pee Wees and the Stratford Junior Braves.

== Professional hockey ==
Libett played junior hockey with the Hamilton Red Wings from 1962 to 1966, and began his professional hockey career with the Memphis Wings (1965–67) and Fort Worth Wings (1967-68).

Libett made his NHL debut with the Detroit Red Wings during the 1967-68 season. He was a starter at left wing for Detroit for 11 consecutive seasons from 1968-69 through the 1978-79 season. He led the NHL in games played four times, scored at least 20 goals six times, averaged over 50 points a season from 1971 to 1975, represented Detroit in the 1977 NHL All-Star Game, and finished seventh in the voting for the Frank J. Selke Trophy during the 1978-79 season. He had a consecutive game streak of 389 games over five seasons, ending in March 1979. He played in the playoffs only twice in his twelve seasons with the Red Wings.

On August 3, 1979, Libett was traded by the Red Wings to the Pittsburgh Penguins in exchange for Pete Mahovlich. He played two season with the Penguins, retiring after the 1980-81 season at age 35.

== Family and later years ==
After retiring from hockey, Libett continued to live in metropolitan Detroit, working for Decoma, an automotive supplier and subsidiary of Magna International. He survived non-Hodgkins lymphoma in the late 1980s.

Libett and his wife, Jacqueline B. Libett, had three children: Stephanie, Christopher and Kathleen. Jacqueline died in 2019; they had been married for 53 years.

== Career statistics ==
=== Regular season and playoffs ===
			Regular season					Playoffs
Season	Team	League	GP	G	A	Pts	PIM	GP	G	A	Pts	PIM
1961–62	Stratford Cullitons	CJHL	—	—	—	—	—	—	—	—	—	—
1962–63	Hamilton Red Wings	OHA	32	1	4	5	21	—	—	—	—	—
1963–64	Hamilton Red Wings	OHA	49	23	19	42	58	—	—	—	—	—
1963–64	Cincinnati Wings	CPHL	3	0	2	2	0	—	—	—	—	—
1964–65	Hamilton Red Wings	OHA	51	24	37	61	60	—	—	—	—	—
1965–66	Hamilton Red Wings	OHA	42	22	22	44	39	5	2	1	3	6
1965–66	Memphis Wings	CPHL	4	1	0	1	2	—	—	—	—	—
1966–67	Memphis Wings	CPHL	62	12	18	30	30	7	2	2	4	4
1967–68	Detroit Red Wings	NHL	22	2	1	3	12	—	—	—	—	—
1967–68	San Diego Gulls	WHL	10	4	2	6	0	—	—	—	—	—
1967–68	Fort Worth Wings	CPHL	40	11	28	39	22	—	—	—	—	—
1968–69	Detroit Red Wings	NHL	75	10	14	24	34	—	—	—	—	—
1969–70	Detroit Red Wings	NHL	76	20	20	40	39	4	2	0	2	2
1970–71	Detroit Red Wings	NHL	78	16	13	29	25	—	—	—	—	—
1971–72	Detroit Red Wings	NHL	77	31	22	53	50	—	—	—	—	—
1972–73	Detroit Red Wings	NHL	78	19	34	53	56	—	—	—	—	—
1973–74	Detroit Red Wings	NHL	67	24	24	48	37	—	—	—	—	—
1974–75	Detroit Red Wings	NHL	80	23	28	51	39	—	—	—	—	—
1975–76	Detroit Red Wings	NHL	80	20	26	46	71	—	—	—	—	—
1976–77	Detroit Red Wings	NHL	80	14	27	41	25	—	—	—	—	—
1977–78	Detroit Red Wings	NHL	80	23	22	45	46	7	3	1	4	0
1978–79	Detroit Red Wings	NHL	68	15	19	34	20	—	—	—	—	—
1979–80	Pittsburgh Penguins	NHL	78	14	12	26	14	5	1	1	2	0
1980–81	Pittsburgh Penguins	NHL	43	6	6	12	4	—	—	—	—	—
NHL totals			982	237	268	505	472	16	6	2	8	2

=== International ===
Year	Team	Event	GP	G	A	Pts	PIM
1979	Canada	WC	8	1	0	1	4
Senior totals			8	1	0	1	4

Preceded by Alex Delvecchio	Detroit Red Wings captain 1973	Succeeded by Red Berenson
Preceded by Dennis Hextall	Detroit Red Wings captain 1979 with Paul Woods	Succeeded by Dale McCourt
