= Rick McCann =

Canadian ice hockey player

- Born: May 27, 1944; Hamilton, Ontario, Canada
- Died: September 3, 2013 (aged 69); London, Ontario, Canada
- Height: 5 ft 9 in (175 cm)
- Weight: 173 lb (78 kg; 12 st 5 lb)
- Position: Centre
- Shot: Left
- Played for: Detroit Red Wings
- National team: Canada
- Playing career: 1966–1976

Richard Leo McCann (May 27, 1944 – September 3, 2013) was a Canadian ice hockey player who played 43 games in the National Hockey League with the Detroit Red Wings between 1967 and 1974. Internationally he played for the Canadian national team at the 1966 World Championships.

== Career statistics ==
=== Regular season and playoffs ===
			Regular season					Playoffs
Season	Team	League	GP	G	A	Pts	PIM	GP	G	A	Pts	PIM
1964–65	Michigan Technological University	WCHA	—	—	—	—	—	—	—	—	—	—
1965–66	Canadian National Team	Intl	—	—	—	—	—	—	—	—	—	—
1966–67	Memphis Wings	CHL	61	15	26	41	23	1	0	0	0	0
1967–68	Detroit Red Wings	NHL	3	0	0	0	0	—	—	—	—	—
1967–68	Fort Worth Wings	CHL	68	20	51	71	98	13	5	11	16	13
1968–69	Detroit Red Wings	NHL	3	0	0	0	0	—	—	—	—	—
1968–69	Fort Worth Wings	CHL	67	22	49	71	63	—	—	—	—	—
1969–70	Detroit Red Wings	NHL	18	0	1	1	4	—	—	—	—	—
1969–70	Fort Worth Wings	CHL	47	15	24	39	29	7	2	4	6	4
1970–71	Detroit Red Wings	NHL	5	0	0	0	0	—	—	—	—	—
1970–71	Baltimore Clippers	AHL	62	18	20	38	21	—	—	—	—	—
1971–72	Tidewater Wings	AHL	69	13	38	51	39	—	—	—	—	—
1972–73	Virginia Wings	AHL	66	12	44	56	75	11	1	9	10	4
1973–74	London Lions	Intl	70	25	55	80	28	—	—	—	—	—
1974–75	Detroit Red Wings	NHL	13	1	3	4	2	—	—	—	—	—
1974–75	Virginia Wings	NHL	65	19	48	67	60	5	1	4	5	0
1975–76	New Haven Nighthawks	AHL	73	15	42	57	47	3	0	0	0	0
AHL totals			335	77	192	269	242	19	2	13	15	4
NHL totals			42	1	4	5	6	—	—	—	—	—

=== International ===
Year	Team	Event	GP	G	A	Pts	PIM
1966	Canada	WC	2	0	0	0	2
Senior totals			2	0	0	0	2
