= John Steinbreder =

American writer

- Born: 1956 (age 69–70)
- Education: University of Nairobi; University of Oregon; Franklin University

John Steinbreder is an American writer. He has written or co-written 28 books, of which 22 have been about golf. He is also a senior writer for Global Golf Post, the digital weekly magazine, and serves as the travel and golf course architecture editor. Steinbreder has reported on the game on five continents, covered 33 major championships and received 18 honors for his work from the Golf Writers Association of America and 47 from the International Network of Golf.

== Education and career ==
After graduating from Choate Rosemary Hall in 1974, Steinbreder attended Franklin University in Lugano, Switzerland, receiving an Associate of Arts degree in 1976. After studying at the University of Nairobi, he transferred to the University of Oregon, where he earned a B.A. in Journalism in 1979. He later worked as a reporter for Fortune magazine from 1983 to 1988 and then moved to Sports Illustrated, where served as a writer and reporter from 1988 to 1991 and after that a special contributor from 1991 to 1994. Steinbreder then joined the staff of Golfweek in 1999, as a senior writer, and was employed there until 2008. A year later, he joined Global Golf Post.

Over the years, Steinbreder has also contributed to a number of prominent publications. Among them are The New York Times Magazine, The Wall Street Journal, Departures, Forbes Life, Golf Digest, Time, Masters Journal, Masters.com and The Weekly Standard.

== Major works ==
- Giants: 70 Years of Championship Football
- A History of the City of New Haven
- Golf Courses of the U.S. Open, by John Steinbreder, Taylor Publishing Co., Dallas, 1996, ISBN 0-87833-940-X. Pictorial history of golf clubs which have hosted the U.S. Open, the premier American golf championship.
- Fighting for Your Children: A Father's Guide to Custody, by John Steinbreder and Richard G. Kent, Taylor Publishing Co., Dallas, 1998, ISBN 0-87833-941-8.
- Giants: 75 Seasons of Championship Football, second edition, by John Steinbreder, Taylor Publishing Co., Dallas, 1999, ISBN 0-87833-159-X. History of the National Football League's New York Giants.
- Hockey for Dummies, by John Davidson and John Steinbreder, John Wiley & Sons, Inc., New York, ISBN 0-7645-5045-4.
- Golf Rules and Etiquette for Dummies, by John Steinbreder, For Dummies, 2001, ISBN 0-7645-5333-X.
- Club Life: The Games Golfers Play, by John Steinbreder, Taylor Publishing Co., Dallas, 2006, ISBN 1-58979-292-0.
- Solomon's Choice: A Guide to Custody for Ex-husbands, Spurned Partners, And Forgotten Grandparents, by John Steinbreder and Richard G. Kent, Taylor Publishing Co., Dallas, 2006, ISBN 1-58979-284-X.
- A Place of Merit - A History of the Merit Club
- Golf Kohler - In The New and Old Worlds
- The Travis Invitational - 100 Years
- The Three-Degree Putting Solution (with Michael Breed)
- The Secrets to Owning Your Swing (with Ed Tischler)
- The History of the Metedeconk National Golf Club
- 18 Ways to Play a Better 18 Holes
- The History of the Society of Seniors
- A History of the Yale Club of New York City
- From Turnberry To Tasmania - Adventures of a Traveling Golfer
- A Centennial History of the PGA of America (editor)
- A History of the Princess Anne Country Club
- A History of the Misquamicut Club
- Picture It - Visualize Better Golf
- The Story of the Saucon Valley Country Club
- A Centennial History of the Kittansett Club
- A History of the Round Hill Club
- One Hundred Years at the Rockville Links
- Westchester Classic - A Centennial History of the Westchester Country Club
- Morocco - Kingdom of Golf
- A History of the Southampton Golf Club
- The Story of Bull's Bridge Golf Club
