= John Davidson (ice hockey) =

Canadian ice hockey executive

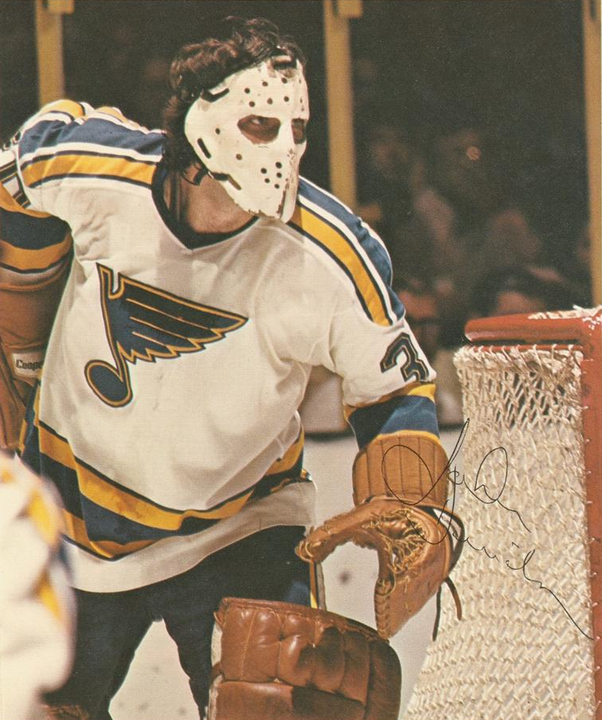
- Davidson in 1973 with the St. Louis Blues
- Born: February 27, 1953 (age 73) Ottawa, Ontario, Canada
- Height: 6 ft 3 in (191 cm)
- Weight: 205 lb (93 kg; 14 st 9 lb)
- Position: Goaltender
- Caught: Left
- Played for: St. Louis Blues; New York Rangers
- NHL draft: 5th overall, 1973; St. Louis Blues
- Playing career: 1973–1983

John Arthur Davidson (born February 27, 1953) is a Canadian–American professional ice hockey executive and former player who serves as a senior advisor for the Buffalo Sabres of the National Hockey League (NHL). As a goaltender, he played in the NHL for the St. Louis Blues and New York Rangers, and helped the Rangers reach the 1979 Stanley Cup Final. Davidson also briefly served as Columbus' interim general manager during the 2023–24 season.

Davidson was also a long-time ice hockey broadcaster, and was honoured by the Hockey Hall of Fame with the 2009 Foster Hewitt Memorial Award for his contributions to broadcasting.

== Playing career ==
Davidson grew up in western Canada and played junior hockey in Calgary, Alberta. He was drafted fifth overall in the 1973 NHL amateur draft, and became the first goalie in NHL history to jump directly from a major junior league to the NHL.

== St. Louis Blues ==
Davidson split duties with veteran Wayne Stephenson during his rookie year and posted slightly better numbers than the veteran, including a goals-against average of 3.08. Just before the start of his second season, the Blues dealt Stephenson to the Philadelphia Flyers and Davidson became the Blues' starting goaltender. His goals-against average rose to 3.66 that season. The following summer, the Blues traded Davidson and Bill Collins to the New York Rangers for Jerry Butler, Ted Irvine and Bert Wilson.

== New York Rangers ==
In New York, Davidson was to share goaltending duties with Ed Giacomin, who had tended goal for the Rangers for the ten previous seasons. However, early in Davidson's first season with the Rangers, the team placed Giacomin on waivers from which he was claimed by the Detroit Red Wings, making Davidson the starting goaltender for the team. He played 56 games for New York that year, the most in his career and a total he was unable to match due to a string of injuries in the years to come. He helped lead the Rangers to the 1979 Stanley Cup Final despite an injured left knee. He wore jersey numbers 35, 00 and 30. He was the first, and one of only two, NHL players to wear the number 00; after Martin Biron wore it briefly in 1995, the league banned the use of the number.

Davidson was the inspiration for the song "Double Vision" by the rock group Foreigner, released in 1978. Some members of the band who were Rangers fans were watching a Stanley Cup playoff game between the Rangers and the Buffalo Sabres. Davidson was shaken up when the puck hit him on his mask. Later, announcers Jim Gordon and Bill Chadwick said Davidson was suffering from "double vision."

== Broadcasting career ==
After retiring due to injury, he joined MSG Network's hockey coverage staff in 1983, and was the color commentator for Rangers games from 1986–87 to 2005–06, working with Sam Rosen. He was known by the nickname "J.D.", became one of the most prominent color commentators in the sport, and his hockey insight is so well respected that he currently sits on the Hockey Hall of Fame selection committee. Long-time network TV partner Mike Emrick also sits on that committee, and the two shared the 2004 Lester Patrick Trophy for service to hockey in the U.S.

In 1994, the Rangers won the Stanley Cup for the first time in 54 years, in the highest-rated game in MSG Network's history; Davidson announced, "No more 1940, it's gone!"

Davidson has also contributed to NHL coverage on such national television networks as CBC, Fox, ESPN/ABC, NBC/OLN, SportsChannel America, and Global. He served as the lead color commentator, alongside lead play-by-play announcer Mike Emrick, for the 1996 World Cup of Hockey, the NHL on Fox from 1994–1999, and again for the NHL on NBC and NHL on OLN from 2005–2006.

Davidson was known for his signature phrase "Oh, baby!" He was also featured in full motion videos shot for the EA Sports video game NHL 97. He co-authored the book Hockey for Dummies (of the popular For Dummies series) with sportswriter John Steinbreder.

Davidson returned to the broadcast booth to broadcast select Columbus Blue Jackets games starting in October 2024, filling in for Jody Shelley.

Davidson returned to the booth with Sam Rosen on April 9, 2025, in honor of Rosen's final season broadcasting.

== Executive career ==
Davidson was named president of the St. Louis Blues on June 30, 2006. He left the Blues after agreeing to a buyout of his contract on October 9, 2012.

He was named president of the Columbus Blue Jackets on October 24, 2012, and held this position until his resignation on May 17, 2019.

On May 17, 2019, Davidson was named president of the New York Rangers. On May 5, 2021, Davidson was fired as president and alternate governor (along with general manager Jeff Gorton) after the Rangers failed to make the playoffs.

On May 20, 2021, the Blue Jackets announced that Davidson would return to Columbus as president of hockey operations and alternate governor. Davidson agreed to a five-year contract with the team. On February 15, 2024, Davidson was named interim general manager of the Blue Jackets, after the firing of Jarmo Kekäläinen. With the hiring of Don Waddell as president of hockey operations and general manager on May 28, 2024, Davidson transitioned into a senior advisor role with Columbus.

== Achievements ==
=== Playing ===
- Alberta Junior Hockey League – MVP (1970–71)
- Alberta Junior Hockey League – Best goalie (1970–71)
- Alberta Junior Hockey League – Second team All-Star (1970–71)
- Western Canada Hockey League – MVP (1971–72)
- Western Canada Hockey League – Top Goaltender Award (1971–72)
- Western Canada Hockey League – First All-Star Team (1971–72)
- Western Canada Hockey League – All-Star Team (1972–73)
- In the 2009 book 100 Ranger Greats, was ranked No. 56 all-time of the 901 New York Rangers who had played during the team's first 82 seasons

=== Broadcasting ===
- CableACE – "Outstanding Live Event Coverage" (1994)
- New York Emmy – "Outstanding On-Camera Achievement" (1995, 2001)
- Lester Patrick Trophy – "Contribution to American hockey" (2004)
- Foster Hewitt Memorial Award; Hockey Hall Of Fame (2009)

== Career statistics ==
=== Regular season and playoffs ===
			Regular season									Playoffs
Season	Team	League	GP	W	L	T	MIN	GA	SO	GAA	SV%	GP	W	L	T	MIN	GA	SO	GAA	SV%
1969–70	Lethbridge Sugar Kings	AJHL	—	—	—	—	—	—	—	—	—	—	—	—	—	—	—	—	—	—
1969–70	Calgary Centennials	WCHL	1	0	0	0	3	0	0	0.00	—	—	—	—	—	—	—	—	—	—
1970–71	Lethbridge Sugar Kings	AJHL	46	—	—	—	2,760	142	3	3.09	—	9	—	—	—	540	23	1	2.56	—
1970–71	Calgary Centennials	WCHL	—	—	—	—	—	—	—	—	—	1	0	0	0	19	1	0	3.16	—
1971–72	Calgary Centennials	WCHL	66	—	—	—	3,970	157	8	2.37	—	13	6	6	1	780	39	0	3.00	—
1971–72	Calgary Centennials	MC	—	—	—	—	—	—	—	—	—	2	0	2	—	118	9	0	4.58	—
1972–73	Calgary Centennials	WCHL	63	—	—	—	3,735	201	2	3.30	—	—	—	—	—	—	—	—	—	—
1973–74	St. Louis Blues	NHL	39	13	19	7	2,300	118	0	3.08	.902	—	—	—	—	—	—	—	—	—
1974–75	St. Louis Blues	NHL	40	17	15	7	2,360	144	0	3.66	.887	1	0	1	—	60	4	0	4.00	.846
1974–75	Denver Spurs	CHL	7	4	2	1	420	27	0	3.86	—	—	—	—	—	—	—	—	—	—
1975–76	New York Rangers	NHL	56	22	28	5	3,207	212	3	3.97	.880	—	—	—	—	—	—	—	—	—
1976–77	New York Rangers	NHL	39	14	14	6	2,116	125	1	3.54	.896	—	—	—	—	—	—	—	—	—
1976–77	New Haven Nighthawks	AHL	2	—	—	—	119	5	0	2.52	—	—	—	—	—	—	—	—	—	—
1977–78	New York Rangers	NHL	34	14	13	4	1,848	98	1	3.18	.899	2	1	1	—	122	7	0	3.44	.901
1978–79	New York Rangers	NHL	39	20	12	5	2,232	131	0	3.52	.873	18	11	7	—	1,106	42	1	2.28	.922
1979–80	New York Rangers	NHL	41	20	15	4	2,306	122	2	3.17	.885	9	4	5	—	541	21	0	2.33	.927
1979–80	New Haven Nighthawks	AHL	4	1	3	0	238	16	0	4.02	—	—	—	—	—	—	—	—	—	—
1980–81	New York Rangers	NHL	10	1	7	1	560	48	0	5.14	.832	—	—	—	—	—	—	—	—	—
1981–82	New York Rangers	NHL	1	1	0	0	60	1	0	1.00	.966	1	0	0	—	33	3	0	5.45	.769
1981–82	Springfield Indians	AHL	8	3	4	0	437	24	0	3.30	—	—	—	—	—	—	—	—	—	—
1982–83	New York Rangers	NHL	2	1	1	0	120	5	0	2.50	.909	—	—	—	—	—	—	—	—	—
NHL totals			301	123	124	39	17,109	1004	7	3.52	.887	31	16	14	—	1,862	77	1	2.48	.918

Awards and achievements
Preceded by Wayne Merrick	St. Louis Blues first-round draft pick 1973	Succeeded by Bernie Federko
Sporting positions
Preceded by Jarmo Kekalainen	General manager of the Columbus Blue Jackets (interim); 2024	Succeeded by Don Waddell
