= East Division (WHA) =

- League: World Hockey Association
- Sport: Ice Hockey
- First season: 1972–73 season
- Folded: 1977
- Most titles: New England Whalers (3)

The WHA's East Division was formed in 1972. The division existed for five seasons until 1977. In 1972, the WHA was formed with 12 teams, split into two divisions of six teams each, with the other division being the West Division. The division existed until 1977, as the WHA decreased to only eight teams and divisions weren't used anymore.

== Division lineups ==
=== 1972–1973 ===
1972–1973 East Division teams
- Cleveland Crusaders
- New England Whalers
- New York Raiders
- Ottawa Nationals
- Philadelphia Blazers
- Quebec Nordiques

=== 1973–1974 ===
1973–1974 East Division teams
- Chicago Cougars
- Cleveland Crusaders
- New England Whalers
- New York Golden Blades/Jersey Knights
- Quebec Nordiques
- Toronto Toros

==== Changes from the 1972–1973 season ====
- The Philadelphia Blazers move to Vancouver, British Columbia and become the Vancouver Blazers, joining the West Division.
- The Chicago Cougars move to the East Division from the West Division as a result of the Blazers moving to Vancouver.
- The Ottawa Nationals relocate to Toronto, Ontario and become the Toronto Toros.
- The New York Raiders are renamed to the New York Golden Blades. The Golden Blades relocate to Cherry Hill, New Jersey and become the Jersey Knights during the 1973-74 season.

=== 1974–1975 ===
1974–1975 East Division teams
- Chicago Cougars
- Cleveland Crusaders
- Indianapolis Racers
- New England Whalers

==== Changes from the 1973–1974 season ====
- The Quebec Nordiques and Toronto Toros move from the East Division to the newly formed Canadian Division.
- The Indianapolis Racers join the East Division as an expansion team.

=== 1975–1976 ===
1975–1976 East Division teams
- Cincinnati Stingers
- Cleveland Crusaders
- Indianapolis Racers
- New England Whalers

==== Changes from the 1974–1975 season ====
- The Chicago Cougars folded during the summer of 1975.
- The Cincinnati Stingers join the East Division as an expansion team.

=== 1976–1977 ===
1976–1977 East Division teams
- Birmingham Bulls
- Cincinnati Stingers
- Indianapolis Racers
- Minnesota Fighting Saints
- New England Whalers
- Quebec Nordiques

==== Changes from the 1975–1976 season ====
- The Cleveland Crusaders folded during the summer of 1976.
- The Toronto Toros of the Canadian Division relocate to Birmingham, Alabama and become the Birmingham Bulls, joining the East Division.
- The Minnesota Fighting Saints join the East Division from the West Division.
- The Quebec Nordiques re-join the East Division as the Canadian Division is dissolved.

=== After the 1976–1977 season ===
The league folded four teams during the off-season, reducing the number of teams to eight, as the WHA decided not to use a divisional format.

== Regular season Division Champions ==
- 1973 - New England Whalers (46–30–2, 94 pts)
- 1974 - New England Whalers (43–31–4, 90 pts)
- 1975 - New England Whalers (43–30–5, 91 pts)
- 1976 - Indianapolis Racers (35–39–6, 76 pts)
- 1977 - Quebec Nordiques (47–31–3, 97 pts)

== Playoff Division Champions ==
- 1973 - New England Whalers
- 1974 - Chicago Cougars
- 1977 - Quebec Nordiques

== Avco Cup winners produced ==
1. 1973 - New England Whalers
2. 1977 - Quebec Nordiques

== East Division Titles Won By Team ==
| Team | Number of Championships Won | Last Year Won |
|---|---|---|
| New England Whalers | 3 | 1975 |
| Indianapolis Racers | 1 | 1976 |
| Quebec Nordiques | 1 | 1977 |

== See also ==
- WHA West Division
- WHA Canadian Division
