= Canadian Division (WHA) =

- League: World Hockey Association
- Sport: Ice Hockey
- First season: 1974-75 season
- Folded: 1976
- Most titles: Quebec Nordiques (1); Winnipeg Jets (1)

The WHA's Canadian Division was formed in 1974. The division existed for two seasons until 1976.

In 1972, the WHA was formed with 12 teams, split into two divisions of six teams each, with the divisions being the East Division and the West Division. In 1974, the league created a third division, the Canadian Division, as all the clubs in this division were based out of Canada.

The Canadian Division existed for two seasons before the league contracted back to two divisions in 1976.

== Division lineups ==
=== 1974–1975 ===
1974–1975 Canadian Division Teams
- Edmonton Oilers
- Quebec Nordiques
- Toronto Toros
- Vancouver Blazers
- Winnipeg Jets

==== Changes from the 1973–1974 season ====
- The Quebec Nordiques and Toronto Toros join the Canadian Division from the East Division.
- The Edmonton Oilers, Vancouver Blazers and Winnipeg Jets join the Canadian Division from the West Division.

=== 1975–1976 ===
1975–1976 Canadian Division Teams
- Calgary Cowboys
- Edmonton Oilers
- Ottawa Civics
- Quebec Nordiques
- Toronto Toros
- Winnipeg Jets

==== Changes from the 1974–1975 season ====
- The Vancouver Blazers relocated to Calgary, Alberta and became the Calgary Cowboys.
- In January 1976, the Denver Spurs relocated to Ottawa, Ontario and became the Ottawa Civics. The team moved from the West Division to the Canadian Division. Shortly after the relocation, the Civics folded.

=== After the 1975–1976 season ===
- Following the 1975-76 season, the league contracted to 12 teams and back to two divisions, the East Division and West Division.
- The Toronto Toros relocated to Birmingham, Alabama and became the Birmingham Bulls. The club joined the East Division.
- The Quebec Nordiques re-joined the East Division.
- The Calgary Cowboys joined the West Division.
- The Edmonton Oilers and Winnipeg Jets re-joined the West Division.

== Regular season Division Champions ==
- 1975 - Quebec Nordiques (46–32–0, 92 pts)
- 1976 - Winnipeg Jets (52–27–2, 106 pts)

== Playoff Division Champions ==
- 1975 - Quebec Nordiques
- 1976 - Winnipeg Jets

== Avco Cup winners produced ==
1. 1976 - Winnipeg Jets

== Canadian Division Titles Won By Team ==
Team	Number of Championships Won	Last Year Won
Quebec Nordiques	1	1975
Winnipeg Jets	1	1976

== See also ==
- WHA East Division
- WHA West Division
