= Bob Hess =

Canadian ice hockey player

- Born: May 19, 1955 (age 71) Middleton, Nova Scotia, Canada
- Height: 5 ft 11 in (180 cm)
- Weight: 175 lb (79 kg; 12 st 7 lb)
- Position: Defence
- Shot: Left
- Played for: NHL; St. Louis Blues; Buffalo Sabres; Hartford Whalers; AHL; Rochester Americans; Maine Mariners
- NHL draft: 26th overall, 1974; St. Louis Blues
- Playing career: 1974–1985

Robert George Hess (born May 19, 1955) is a Canadian former professional ice hockey defenceman. He played in the National Hockey League for the St. Louis Blues, Buffalo Sabres, and Hartford Whalers. Between 1982 and 1984 Hess played in Switzerland's Nationalliga A for HC Lugano and EHC Kloten.

== Playing career ==
Hess was drafted in the second round, 26th overall, by the St. Louis Blues in the 1974 NHL amateur draft.

He appeared in 329 NHL games scoring 27 goals and 95 assists for 122 points. He is a member of the St. Louis Blues Alumni Association.

== Transactions ==
- October 30, 1980 - Traded by the St. Louis Blues with the 4th round pick in the 1981 NHL Entry Draft (Anders Wikberg) to the Buffalo Sabres for Bill Stewart
- December, 1984 - Signed as a free agent with the Hartford Whalers

== Career statistics ==
=== Regular season and playoffs ===
			Regular season					Playoffs
Season	Team	League	GP	G	A	Pts	PIM	GP	G	A	Pts	PIM
1971–72	New Westminster Bruins	WCHL	5	0	0	0	0	—	—	—	—	—
1972–73	New Westminster Bruins	WCHL	67	6	13	19	29	—	—	—	—	—
1973–74	New Westminster Bruins	WCHL	68	10	30	40	104	—	—	—	—	—
1974–75	St. Louis Blues	NHL	76	9	30	39	58	1	0	0	0	2
1975–76	St. Louis Blues	NHL	78	9	23	32	58	1	0	1	1	0
1976–77	St. Louis Blues	NHL	53	4	18	22	14	1	0	0	0	0
1976–77	Kansas City Blues	CHL	10	1	8	9	16	—	—	—	—	—
1977–78	St. Louis Blues	NHL	55	2	12	14	16	—	—	—	—	—
1977–78	Salt Lake Golden Eagles	CHL	7	1	3	4	4	—	—	—	—	—
1978–79	St. Louis Blues	NHL	27	3	4	7	14	—	—	—	—	—
1978–79	Salt Lake Golden Eagles	CHL	45	19	29	48	22	9	4	6	10	9
1979–80	Salt Lake Golden Eagles	CHL	79	32	42	74	71	13	0	8	8	14
1980–81	St. Louis Blues	NHL	4	0	0	0	4	—	—	—	—	—
1980–81	Buffalo Sabres	NHL	—	—	—	—	—	1	1	0	1	0
1980–81	Rochester Americans	AHL	70	17	58	75	95	1	1	0	1	0
1981–82	Buffalo Sabres	NHL	33	0	8	8	14	—	—	—	—	—
1981–82	Rochester Americans	AHL	22	6	13	19	10	9	1	3	4	2
1982–83	Maine Mariners	AHL	13	5	3	8	10	17	0	9	9	15
1983–84	Hartford Whalers	NHL	3	0	0	0	0	—	—	—	—	—
1983–84	Indianapolis Checkers	CHL	9	2	6	8	10	9	2	4	6	6
1984–85	Salt Lake Golden Eagles	IHL	48	9	21	30	25	7	0	7	7	2
AHL totals			105	28	74	102	115	26	1	12	13	17
NHL totals			329	27	95	122	178	4	1	1	2	2
