= West Division (WHA) =

- League: World Hockey Association
- Sport: Ice Hockey
- First season: 1972–73 season
- Folded: 1977
- Most titles: Houston Aeros (4)

The WHA's West Division was formed in 1972. The division existed for five seasons until 1977. In 1972, the WHA was formed with 12 teams, split into two divisions of six teams each, with the other division being the East Division. The division existed until 1977, as the WHA decreased to only eight teams and divisions weren't used anymore.

== Division lineups ==
=== 1972–1973 ===
1972–1973 West Division
- Alberta Oilers
- Chicago Cougars
- Houston Aeros
- Los Angeles Sharks
- Minnesota Fighting Saints
- Winnipeg Jets

=== 1973–1974 ===
1973–1974 West Division
- Edmonton Oilers
- Houston Aeros
- Los Angeles Sharks
- Minnesota Fighting Saints
- Vancouver Blazers
- Winnipeg Jets

==== Changes from the 1972–1973 season ====
- The Philadelphia Blazers move to Vancouver, British Columbia and become the Vancouver Blazers, joining the West Division.
- The Chicago Cougars move to the East Division from the West Division as a result of the Blazers moving to Vancouver.
- The Alberta Oilers rename their team to the Edmonton Oilers.

=== 1974–1975 ===
1974–1975 West Division
- Houston Aeros
- Michigan Stags/Baltimore Blades
- Minnesota Fighting Saints
- Phoenix Roadrunners
- San Diego Mariners

==== Changes from the 1973–1974 season ====
- The Edmonton Oilers, Vancouver Blazers and Winnipeg Jets move from the West Division to the newly formed Canadian Division.
- The Los Angeles Sharks relocate to Detroit, Michigan, becoming the Michigan Stags. In January 1975, the Stags would relocate to Baltimore, Maryland, becoming the Baltimore Blades.
- The Jersey Knights relocate to San Diego, California, becoming the San Diego Mariners. The team moved from the East Division to the West Division.
- The Phoenix Roadrunners join the West Division as an expansion team.

=== 1975–1976 ===
1975–1976 West Division
- Denver Spurs/Ottawa Civics
- Houston Aeros
- Minnesota Fighting Saints
- Phoenix Roadrunners
- San Diego Mariners

==== Changes from the 1974–1975 season ====
- The Baltimore Blades folded during the summer of 1975.
- The Denver Spurs join the West Division as an expansion team. In January 1976, the Spurs would relocate to Ottawa, Ontario, becoming the Ottawa Civics. The team folded during the season shortly after their relocation.

=== 1976–1977 ===
1976–1977 West Division
- Calgary Cowboys
- Edmonton Oilers
- Houston Aeros
- Phoenix Roadrunners
- San Diego Mariners
- Winnipeg Jets

==== Changes from the 1975–1976 season ====
- The Edmonton Oilers and Winnipeg Jets re-join the West Division as the Canadian Division is dissolved.
- The Calgary Cowboys join the West Division from the Canadian Division.

=== After the 1976–1977 season ===
The league folded four teams during the off-season, reducing the number of teams to eight, as the WHA decided not to use a divisional format.

== Regular season Division Champions ==
- 1973 - Winnipeg Jets (43–31–4, 90 pts)
- 1974 - Houston Aeros (48–25–5, 101 pts)
- 1975 - Houston Aeros (53–25–0, 106 pts)
- 1976 - Houston Aeros (53–27–0, 106 pts)
- 1977 - Houston Aeros (50–24–6, 106 pts)

== Playoff Division Champions ==
- 1973 - Winnipeg Jets
- 1974 - Houston Aeros
- 1977 - Winnipeg Jets

== Avco Cup winners produced ==
1. 1974 - Houston Aeros
2. 1975 - Houston Aeros

== West Division Titles Won By Team ==
Team	Number of Championships Won	Last Year Won
Houston Aeros	4	1977
Winnipeg Jets	1	1973

== See also ==
- WHA East Division
- WHA Canadian Division
