= Bill Collins (ice hockey) =

Canadian ice hockey player

- Born: July 13, 1943 (age 83) Ottawa, Ontario, Canada
- Height: 6 ft 0 in (183 cm)
- Weight: 180 lb (82 kg; 12 st 12 lb)
- Position: Centre
- Shot: Right
- Played for: Minnesota North Stars; Montreal Canadiens; Detroit Red Wings; St. Louis Blues; New York Rangers; Philadelphia Flyers; Washington Capitals
- Playing career: 1964–1978

William Earl Collins (born July 13, 1943) is a Canadian former professional ice hockey centre who played in the National Hockey League (NHL) for the Minnesota North Stars, Montreal Canadiens, Detroit Red Wings, St. Louis Blues, New York Rangers, Philadelphia Flyers, and Washington Capitals between 1967 and 1978.

Collins was born in Ottawa, Ontario.

== Career statistics ==
=== Regular season and playoffs ===
			Regular season					Playoffs
Season	Team	League	GP	G	A	Pts	PIM	GP	G	A	Pts	PIM
1960–61	Toronto Marlboros	OHA	37	4	9	13	46	—	—	—	—	—
1961–62	Whitby Mohawks	OHA	27	16	24	40	78	2	1	2	3	18
1962–63	Whitby Dunlops	OHA	22	22	22	44	32	4	7	4	11	18
1962–63	Sudbury Wolves	EPHL	—	—	—	—	—	6	1	1	2	2
1963–64	Denver Invaders	WHL	58	17	15	32	54	—	—	—	—	—
1963–64	Baltimore Clippers	AHL	11	0	1	1	0	—	—	—	—	—
1964–65	Baltimore Clippers	AHL	6	0	0	0	0	—	—	—	—	—
1964–65	St. Paul Rangers	CPHL	58	12	29	41	47	11	5	2	7	24
1965–66	Minnesota Rangers	CPHL	56	18	29	47	55	7	0	5	5	4
1966–67	Baltimore Clippers	AHL	69	20	18	38	50	6	1	1	2	12
1967–68	Minnesota North Stars	NHL	71	9	11	20	41	10	2	4	6	4
1968–69	Minnesota North Stars	NHL	75	9	10	19	24	—	—	—	—	—
1969–70	Minnesota North Stars	NHL	74	29	9	38	48	6	0	1	1	8
1970–71	Montreal Canadiens	NHL	40	6	2	8	39	—	—	—	—	—
1970–71	Detroit Red Wings	NHL	36	5	16	21	10	—	—	—	—	—
1971–72	Detroit Red Wings	NHL	71	15	25	40	38	—	—	—	—	—
1972–73	Detroit Red Wings	NHL	78	21	21	42	44	—	—	—	—	—
1973–74	Detroit Red Wings	NHL	54	13	15	28	37	—	—	—	—	—
1973–74	St. Louis Blues	NHL	12	2	2	4	14	—	—	—	—	—
1974–75	St. Louis Blues	NHL	70	22	15	37	34	2	1	0	1	0
1975–76	New York Rangers	NHL	50	4	4	8	38	—	—	—	—	—
1976–77	Philadelphia Flyers	NHL	9	1	1	2	4	—	—	—	—	—
1976–77	Washington Capitals	NHL	54	11	14	25	26	—	—	—	—	—
1977–78	Washington Capitals	NHL	74	10	9	19	18	—	—	—	—	—
NHL totals			768	157	154	311	415	18	3	5	8	12
