= Cincinnati Wings =

American professional ice hockey team

The Indianapolis Capitols/Cincinnati Wings were a professional ice hockey team that operated for one season in the Central Professional Hockey League (CPHL). Originally named the Indianapolis Capitals, the team started the 1963–64 season playing out of the Fairgrounds Coliseum in Indianapolis, but only nine games into the season a gas explosion during an ice show destroyed the Indianapolis Coliseum. The Capitols' parent club, the Detroit Red Wings, terminated their lease on the rink and moved the franchise to Cincinnati, Ohio, to become the Cincinnati Wings. The Wings played the remaining games of that season at the Cincinnati Gardens and relocated to Memphis, Tennessee, for the 1964–65 season to become the Memphis Wings.

In 1963–64 the combined Indianapolis/Cincinnati team had a record of 12-53-7-31 and finished in 5th (last) place in the CPHL.

== Indianapolis Capitols/Cincinnati Wings roster ==
- Tony Leswick (Head Coach)
- Alex Faulkner
- Barrie Ross
- Bert Marshall
- Bill Mitchell
- Bob Champoux (goalie)
- Bob Wall
- Bryan Campbell
- Dennis Kassian
- Dennis Rathwell
- Don Chiz
- Doug Messier
- Earl Heiskala
- Frank Hincks
- Hank Bassen (goalie)
- Harrison Gray (goalie)
- Howie Menard
- Irv Spencer
- Jack Faulkner
- Jack McIntyre
- Jim Peters
- Jim Watson
- Joe Daley (goalie)
- Ken Laufman
- Max Mestinsek
- Nick Libett
- Norm Beaudin
- Pete Shearer
- Ray Ross
- Richard "Chick" Balon
- Roger Lafreniere
- Ron Harris
- Ron Leopold
- Sid Finney
- Stuart "Butch" Paul
- Wayne Muloin
