= Memphis Wings =

Defunct American ice hockey team

- City: Memphis, Tennessee
- League: Central Hockey League
- Operated: 1964–1967
- Colors: Red & White
- Affiliates: Detroit Red Wings

Franchise history
- 1963: Indianapolis Capitals
- 1963–1964: Cincinnati Wings
- 1964–1967: Memphis Wings
- 1967–1974: Fort Worth Wings
- 1974–1982: Fort Worth Texans

The Memphis Wings were a professional ice hockey team in Memphis, Tennessee. They played from 1964 to 1967 in the Central Professional Hockey League. As their name suggested, they were a farm team of the NHL's Detroit Red Wings.

== History ==
The Red Wings' farm team was originally (in 1963–64) in Indianapolis. An arena explosion in November moved the team to become the Cincinnati Wings. The following season, the team moved into Memphis.

The Wings missed the playoffs in their first two years. In 1966–67, they made it into the semi-final, which they lost in seven games to the Omaha Knights. Attendance in the first year was over 130,000, or over 3,700 a game. In 1966–67, the attendance was about 71,000, or just over 2,000 a game.

In 1967 the team moved to become the Fort Worth Wings. The team was replaced by the Memphis South Stars.

== Season-by-season records ==
Central Hockey League
Season	Games	Won	Lost	Tied	Points	Goals For	Goals Against	Standing	Playoffs
1964-65	70	26	35	9	61	243	245	5th	Out of Playoffs
1965-66	70	25	33	12	62	200	223	6th	Out of Playoffs
1966-67	70	30	32	8	68	230	259	4th	Lost Semi Final

== Notable players ==
- Gerry Abel
- Henry Anderson
- Doug Barrie
- Norm Beaudin
- Danny Belisle
- Gary Bergman
- Craig Cameron
- Bryan Campbell
- Dwight Carruthers
- Billy Carter
- Bob Champoux
- Bart Crashley
- Joe Daley
- Bob Falkenberg
- Alex Faulkner
- George Gardner
- Warren Godfrey
- Ron Harris
- Chuck Holmes
- Brent Hughes
- Roger Lafreniere
- Real Lemieux
- Nick Libett
- John MacMillan
- Lou Marcon
- Gary Marsh
- Bert Marshall
- Rick McCann
- Ab McDonald
- Howie Menard
- Butch Paul
- Jimmy Peters, Jr.
- Andre Pronovost
- Pat Quinn
- Doug Roberts
- Dave Rochefort
- Glen Sather
- Sandy Snow
- Irv Spencer
- Vic Stasiuk
- Bob Wall
- Bryan Watson
- Jim Watson
