= Omaha Knights (1963–1965) =

- City: Omaha, Nebraska
- League: Central Professional Hockey League
- Operated: 1963–1965
- Home arena: Ak-Sar-Ben Arena
- Colors: Black and Red

Franchise history
- 1963–1965: Omaha Knights
- 1965–1969: Houston Apollos
- 1979–1981: Houston Apollos

Championships
- Regular season titles: 1963–64
- Playoff championships: 1964

The Omaha Knights was a minor professional ice hockey team in Omaha, Nebraska. The franchise was founded in 1963 as a replacement for the IHL's Omaha Knights but only managed to play two seasons before relocating to Houston, Texas.

== Season-by-season records ==
Season	GP	W	L	T	Pts	GF	GA	Place	Playoffs
1963–64	72	44	19	9	97	311	218	1st	Won Championship
1964–65	70	37	25	8	82	246	238	2nd	Lost semifinal
Totals	142	81	44	17	–	557	456	–	–
