= 1962 Memorial Cup =

Canadian junior ice hockey championship

The Memorial Cup trophy

The 1962 Memorial Cup final was the 44th junior ice hockey championship of the Canadian Amateur Hockey Association. The George Richardson Memorial Trophy champions Hamilton Red Wings of the Ontario Hockey Association in Eastern Canada competed against the Abbott Cup champions Edmonton Oil Kings of the Central Alberta Hockey League in Western Canada. In a best-of-seven series, held at the Guelph Memorial Gardens in Guelph, Ontario, Kitchener Memorial Auditorium in Kitchener, Ontario, and the Barton Street Arena in Hamilton, Ontario, Hamilton won their 1st Memorial Cup, defeating Edmonton 4 games to 1.

== Schedule and scores ==
Canadian Amateur Hockey Association (CAHA) president Jack Roxburgh announced the original schedule for the 1962 Memorial Cup with all games played at Maple Leaf Gardens and broadcast by CFTO-TV. The CAHA was threatened with legal action by K.D. Soble who owned both the Red Wings and CHCH-TV in Hamilton, Ontario, if the CAHA did not share the broadcast profits. The dispute was resolved with games moved to the Hamilton Forum, Guelph and Kitchener, Ontario. CFTO would no longer broadcast the series, and CHCH would cover all games. Roxburgh re-affirmed that the CAHA controlled broadcast rights for its games, and not the individual arenas. As a result of the change, the teams received a share of the television revenue.

Scores:

- Game 1: Hamilton 5-2 Edmonton (in Hamilton)
- Game 2: Hamilton 4-2 Edmonton (in Guelph)
- Game 3: Edmonton 5-3 Hamilton (in Guelph)
- Game 4: Hamilton 3-0 Edmonton (in Guelph)
- Game 5: Hamilton 7-4 Edmonton (in Kitchener)

== Winning roster ==
Bud Blom, Joe Bujdoso, Bryan Campbell, Bob Dean, John Gofton, Bob Hamilton, Ron Harris, Larry Harrop, Earl Heiskala, Paul Henderson, Roger LaFreniere, Lowell MacDonald, Pit Martin, Jim Peters, Wayne Rivers, Bob Wall, Jack Wildfong, Larry Ziliotto. Captain: Howie Menard Coach: Eddie Bush
