= St. Paul Rangers =

Defunct American ice hockey team

- City: Saint Paul, Minnesota, USA
- League: CPHL
- Founded: 1963
- Folded: 1975
- Affiliates: New York Rangers

Franchise history
- 1963–1965: St. Paul Rangers
- 1965–1966: Minnesota Rangers
- 1966–1975: Omaha Knights

Championships
- Playoff championships: 1965

The St. Paul Rangers, later the Minnesota Rangers, were a minor professional ice hockey team based in Saint Paul, Minnesota. They were one of the original five teams of the Central Professional Hockey League. They were an affiliate of the National Hockey League's New York Rangers.

Their name was changed to the Minnesota Rangers in 1965 after the neighboring city of Minneapolis lost its Central League team. The Rangers, though, continued to play in St. Paul. In 1966 the Rangers moved their farm team to Omaha, Nebraska in anticipation of the debut of the NHL's Minnesota North Stars in 1967.

The Rangers won the Adams Cup in 1964-65.

== Season-by-season record ==
Note: GP = Games played, W = Wins, L = Losses, T = Ties, Pts = Points, GF = Goals for, GA = Goals against, PIM = Penalties in minutes

Season	GP	W	L	T	Pts	GF	GA	PIM	Finish	Playoffs
1963–64	72	38	30	4	80	259	230	N/A	2nd	Lost Final
1964–65	70	41	23	6	88	281	223	N/A	1st	Won Adams Cup
1965–66	74	34	29	11	79	229	197	N/A	1st	Lost Semifinal
Totals	216	113	82	21	77	769	650	N/A		
