= 1963–64 CPHL season =

American ice hockey season

The 1963–64 Central Professional Hockey League season was the first season of the Central Professional Hockey League, a North American minor pro league. Five teams participated in the regular season, and the Omaha Knights won the league title.

== Regular season ==
Central Professional Hockey League	GP	W	L	OTL	GF	GA	Pts
Omaha Knights (MTL)	72	44	19	9	311	218	97
St. Paul Rangers (NYR)	72	38	30	4	259	230	80
Minneapolis Bruins (BOS)	72	36	29	7	294	270	79
St. Louis Braves (CHI)	72	33	32	7	316	275	73
Indianapolis Capitals/Cincinnati Wings (DET)	72	12	53	7	207	394	31

== Playoffs ==
Semifinals
1	Omaha Knights	4
3	Minneapolis Bruins	1
2	St. Paul Rangers	4
4	St. Louis Braves	2

Final
1	Omaha Knights	4
2	St. Paul Rangers	1
