= 1964–65 CPHL season =

American ice hockey season

The 1964–65 Central Professional Hockey League season was the second season of the Central Professional Hockey League, a North American minor pro league. Six teams participated in the regular season, and the St. Paul Rangers won the league title.

== Regular season ==
Central Professional Hockey League	GP	W	L	OTL	GF	GA	Pts
St. Paul Rangers	70	41	23	6	281	223	88
Omaha Knights	70	37	25	8	246	238	82
Minneapolis Bruins	70	36	27	7	239	193	79
Tulsa Oilers	70	35	27	8	254	224	78
Memphis Wings	70	26	35	9	243	245	61
St. Louis Braves	70	13	51	6	189	329	32

== Playoffs ==
Semifinals
1	St. Paul Rangers	4
3	Minneapolis Bruins	1
2	Omaha Knights	2
4	Tulsa Oilers	4

Final
1	St. Paul Rangers	4
4	Tulsa Oilers	2
