= Face-Off (1971 film) =

- Directed by: George McCowan
- Written by: George Robertson
- Produced by: John F. Bassett
- Starring: Trudy Young; Art Hindle; Frank Moore; Austin Willis; Vivian Reis; John Vernon
- Edited by: Kirk Jones
- Music by: Ron Collier
- Production company: Agincourt International
- Distributed by: Alliance Film Distribution
- Release date: 12 November 1971 (Toronto)
- Running time: 105 minutes
- Country: Canada
- Language: English
- Budget: $600,000
- Box office: $600,000

Face-Off (a.k.a. Winter Comes Early in the USA) is a 1971 Canadian feature film produced by John F. Bassett starring Art Hindle, Trudy Young and John Vernon. The story line concerns a rookie Toronto Maple Leafs ice hockey player and his romance with a musician. Several National Hockey League players also appeared in the film.

== Plot ==
Hockey player Billy Duke joins the Toronto Maple Leafs, and must adapt to the big league game with assistance from his room-mate, George Armstrong. Meanwhile, Duke starts a relationship with rock singer Sherri Lee Nelson, who objects to Duke's often rough hockey playing. As the two become more involved, Leafs' coach Fred Wares worries that Sherri is causing Duke to lose his on-ice focus.

== Cast ==
The main cast, per the opening credits, are:

- Trudy Young as Sherri Lee Nelson (lead singer of "The Final Chorus")
- Art Hindle as Billy Duke
- John Vernon as Fred Wares (Leafs coach)
- Frank Moore as Barney Job (lead guitarist of "The Final Chorus")
- Austin Willis as Graydon Hunter (Leafs owner)
- Sean Sullivan as Greg Walsh (newspaper reporter who keeps dumping on Billy and Sherri)
- Vivian Reis as Grace Wares (coach's wife)
- Weston Gavin (opening credits, oddly missed in detailed closing, promoter Syd Charrington for "The Final Chorus")
- Steve Pernie as Joe MacMillan (Billy's and Sanderson's player agent)
- Kay Hawtrey as Mrs. Duke (Billy's mother)
- George Armstrong as himself
- Derek Sanderson as himself
- The Toronto Maple Leafs as themselves

The 1970–71 Toronto Maple Leafs served as Billy Duke's National Hockey League (NHL) team, with players appearing in real game footage as well as many scripted scenes throughout the film. Leafs player Jim McKenny wore #18 with the team that season, thus served as #18 "Billy Duke" in actual game footage. Some Leafs players had scripted lines of dialogue, including: Paul Henderson, dances with Sherri at New Year's party, "You're a real swinger"; Jim Dorey, fights with Billy in the dressing room, "Who the hell do you think you are"; Ron Ellis, gets some medical attention in the dressing room, "Hey Billy boy - aren't you going to ask us how we lost those three games"; Rick Ley, teases Billy in the dressing room, "What's the secret of faking a 10-day layoff?"; while George Armstrong is a credited performer, with numerous speaking lines.

Players from other NHL teams also made appearances, in filmed scenes or actual game footage, including Jean Béliveau, Gordie Howe and Bobby Hull. Game film included, and the closing credits acknowledged, the 1970–71 Boston Bruins, 1970–71 Montreal Canadiens, 1970–71 Los Angeles Kings, 1970–71 Chicago Black Hawks, 1970–71 Detroit Red Wings, 1970–71 Philadelphia Flyers, 1970–71 California Golden Seals, 1970–71 Vancouver Canucks and 1970–71 New York Rangers. Some members of the actual press corps that covered the Leafs and the NHL had lines in the film, including George Gross, Scott Young and Fergie Olver (misspelled "Oliver"). The long-time medical trainer for the Leafs, Joe Sgro, had scripted lines as the "Leaf Trainer", appearing in one scene with a silent Leafs owner Harold Ballard as "Leaf Doctor".

== Production ==
The film was produced by Basset's Agincourt International studio and was financially supported by the Canadian Film Development Corporation.

Product placements, besides the presence of the Toronto Maple Leafs brand, included visible use of Molson brand beer and scenes filmed at Eaton's and the Inn on the Park hotel. The Eaton's connection included then-racecar-driver George Eaton, future chief executive officer of Eaton's, playing the role of Max in the film.

== Release ==
The film's debut was in Toronto on 12 November 1971 and released the following week throughout Canada at 20 theatres which was then the widest distribution of a Canadian feature film. The film was distributed in 1971 by Alliance Film Distribution in Canada, and Cannon Films in the U.S.

== Reception ==
The film generally received negative reviews. Martin Knelman of The Globe and Mail found the production "downright head-clutchingly terrible." Regina's Leader-Post cited "terrible acting and inane dialogue". Dave Billington of The Gazette (Montreal) also panned the production noting that "most of the ingredients of a good film were there and they were sacrificed to box office expediency." The Windsor Star was also critical noting such deficiences as "a sluggish pace and fumbling character development."

Face-Off grossed $600,000 in Canada ($4.7 million today) at the box office by early 1973, the highest-grossing Canadian English language film in Canada. Although a substantial box office income for a Canadian film, the Canadian Film Development Corporation did not expect to fully recoup its investment unless the film earned twice that amount.

Upon the 2011 DVD release of Face-Off, Sun Media's Bruce Kirkland acknowledged the "cheesy" production but noted the historic value of filmed scenes which included professional hockey players which he deemed of superior quality compared to the "crappy TV archives" of NHL footage of that time.

== Video release ==
Face-Off was restored from an extant 35 mm print and released in Blu-ray format by Video Services Corp on 15 November 2011. Only 10,000 discs were produced, due to complications in obtaining permission from the NHL for the hockey footage used in the film. The DVD release includes the Second City Television parody of the film, "Power Play", which featured John Candy as Billy.

== See also ==
- List of films about ice hockey
