= 1970–71 California Golden Seals season =

NHL season

1970–71 Bay Area Seals / California Golden Seals
- Division: 7th West
- 1970–71 record: 20–53–5
- Home record: 17–21–1
- Road record: 3–32–4
- Goals for: 199
- Goals against: 320

Team information
- General manager: Frank Selke Jr. Bill Torrey; Fred Glover
- Coach: Fred Glover
- Captain: Ted Hampson; Carol Vadnais
- Alternate captains: Bill Hicke; Bert Marshall; Earl Ingarfield
- Arena: Oakland Coliseum Arena
- Average attendance: 5,358

Team leaders
- Goals: Ernie Hicke (22)
- Assists: Dennis Hextall (31)
- Points: Dennis Hextall (52)
- Penalty minutes: Dennis Hextall (217)
- Wins: Gary Smith (19)
- Goals against average: Gary Smith (3.86)

The 1970–71 California Golden Seals season was the Seals' fourth in the NHL, but their first as the Golden Seals. Oakland Athletics owner Charlie O. Finley bought the team in the offseason for approximately $4,500,000. He announced a name change in which his team would be called the Bay Area Seals. On October 16, after the first two games of the season, Finley changed the name once again. The team became known as the California Golden Seals in an attempt to draw fans from across the state of California, in particular from nearby San Francisco. Along with the name change came new green and gold colours, and a new logo and uniforms.

Several other changes occurred in the Seals' front office after Finley bought the team. Unhappy, General Manager Frank Selke Jr. quit in October 1970. His replacement, Bill Torrey, lasted only a month before resigning himself. Coach Fred Glover took over the responsibilities of General Manager after Torrey's departure in November.

Amidst the shake-up of the Seals from a business point of view the on-ice performance of the team suffered greatly. The team finished the season with an NHL-worst record of 20-53-5 (45 points). It was the worst season in their history up to that point in time, and the 53 losses set an NHL record (since surpassed). The Seals record was worse than both of the two expansion teams that season, the Buffalo Sabres and the Vancouver Canucks.

On May 22, 1970, The Seals made a trade with the Montreal Canadiens that would come back to haunt the franchise for the rest of their existence. In the trade, the Seals sent defenseman Francois Lacombe along with their first round draft pick in 1971 to the Montreal Canadiens for Ernie Hicke and Montreal's first round pick. Since the Seals finished with the NHL's worst record that season, that gave the Canadiens the first overall pick in the 1971 draft which they used to select future hall of famer Guy Lafleur.

Captain Ted Hampson was traded to the Minnesota North Stars late in the season, and was replaced by Carol Vadnais.

== Offseason ==
=== Amateur draft ===
Round	Pick	Player	Nationality	College/junior/club team
1	10.	Chris Oddleifson	Canada	Winnipeg Jets (WCHL)
2	19.	Pete Laframboise	Canada	Ottawa 67's (OHA)
3	33.	Randy Rota	Canada	Calgary Centennials (WCHL)
4	47.	Ted McAneeley	Canada	Edmonton Oil Kings (WCHL)
5	61.	Ray Gibbs	Canada	Charlottetown (Senior)
6	75.	Doug Moyes	Canada	Sorel Black Hawks (QMJHL)
7	88.	Terry Murray	Canada	Ottawa 67's (OHA)
8	100.	Alan Henry	Canada	University of North Dakota (NCAA)

== Regular season ==
=== Standings ===
West Division
		GP	W	L	T	GF	GA	DIFF	Pts
1	Chicago Black Hawks	78	49	20	9	277	184	+93	107
2	St. Louis Blues	78	34	25	19	223	208	+15	87
3	Philadelphia Flyers	78	28	33	17	207	225	−18	73
4	Minnesota North Stars	78	28	34	16	191	223	−32	72
5	Los Angeles Kings	78	25	40	13	239	303	−64	63
6	Pittsburgh Penguins	78	21	37	20	221	240	−19	62
7	California Golden Seals	78	20	53	5	199	320	−121	45

=== Record vs. opponents ===
==== Vs. West Division ====
1970–71 NHL records
Team	CAL	CHI	LAK	MIN	PHI	PIT	STL	Total
California	—	1–5	1–5	2–4	2–3–1	1–4–1	1–4–1	8–25–3
Chicago	5–1	—	4–2	3–2–1	4–1–1	4–2	2–1–3	22–9–5
Los Angeles	5–1	2–4	—	0–5–1	1–2–3	4–2	2–4	14–18–4
Minnesota	4–2	2–3–1	5–0–1	—	1–2–3	3–1–2	3–1–2	18–9–9
Philadelphia	3–2–1	1–4–1	2–1–3	2–1–3	—	3–1–2	1–3–2	12–12–12
Pittsburgh	4–1–1	2–4	2–4	1–3–2	1–3–2	—	0–3–3	10–18–8
St. Louis	4–1–1	1–2–3	4–2	1–3–2	3–1–2	3–0–3	—	16–9–11

==== Vs. East Division ====
1970–71 NHL records
Team	BOS	BUF	DET	MTL	NYR	TOR	VAN	Total
California	1–5	3–3	2–4	1–5	2–3–1	2–3–1	1–5	12–28–2
Chicago	3–2–1	5–0–1	6–0	3–3	3–3	2–3–1	5–0–1	27–11–4
Los Angeles	1–5	1–2–3	2–1–3	2–4	0–4–2	3–3	2–3–1	11–22–9
Minnesota	0–5–1	1–5	3–2–1	1–3–2	0–6	2–2–2	3–2–1	10–25–7
Philadelphia	0–6	3–2–1	2–3–1	1–4–1	3–2–1	3–2–1	4–2	16–21–5
Pittsburgh	1–4–1	0–2–4	3–1–2	1–3–2	0–5–1	2–3–1	4–1–1	11–19–12
St. Louis	1–4–1	4–2	5–0–1	1–3–2	2–3–1	2–3–1	3–1–2	18–16–8

== Schedule and results ==
1970–71 regular season
October

Game	Result	Date	Score	Opponent	Record
1	L	October 10, 1970	3–5	@ Detroit Red Wings (1970–71)	0–1–0
2	L	October 11, 1970	1–5	@ Chicago Black Hawks (1970–71)	0–2–0
3	L	October 16, 1970	1–5	Boston Bruins (1970–71)	0–3–0
4	L	October 17, 1970	1–6	@ Los Angeles Kings (1970–71)	0–4–0
5	L	October 20, 1970	1–2	@ Vancouver Canucks (1970–71)	0–5–0
6	T	October 21, 1970	2–2	St. Louis Blues (1970–71)	0–5–1
7	L	October 23, 1970	1–3	Pittsburgh Penguins (1970–71)	0–6–1
8	T	October 25, 1970	2–2	@ New York Rangers (1970–71)	0–6–2
9	L	October 28, 1970	2–3	@ St. Louis Blues (1970–71)	0–7–2
10	W	October 30, 1970	6–1	Buffalo Sabres (1970–71)	1–7–2

November

Game	Result	Date	Score	Opponent	Record
11	W	November 4, 1970	3–1	New York Rangers (1970–71)	2–7–2
12	W	November 6, 1970	8–4	Toronto Maple Leafs (1970–71)	3–7–2
13	W	November 11, 1970	2–0	Montreal Canadiens (1970–71)	4–7–2
14	L	November 13, 1970	2–4	@ Buffalo Sabres (1970–71)	4–8–2
15	L	November 14, 1970	1–6	@ Pittsburgh Penguins (1970–71)	4–9–2
16	W	November 15, 1970	2–1	@ Boston Bruins (1970–71)	5–9–2
17	L	November 17, 1970	1–5	@ Montreal Canadiens (1970–71)	5–10–2
18	L	November 19, 1970	2–6	@ Philadelphia Flyers (1970–71)	5–11–2
19	L	November 21, 1970	3–5	@ Toronto Maple Leafs (1970–71)	5–12–2
20	L	November 22, 1970	0–9	@ Chicago Black Hawks (1970–71)	5–13–2
21	L	November 25, 1970	1–3	Los Angeles Kings (1970–71)	5–14–2
22	L	November 27, 1970	2–3	Minnesota North Stars (1970–71)	5–15–2
23	W	November 29, 1970	2–1	@ Buffalo Sabres (1970–71)	6–15–2

December

Game	Result	Date	Score	Opponent	Record
24	L	December 2, 1970	2–3	@ Minnesota North Stars (1970–71)	6–16–2
25	L	December 4, 1970	0–4	Philadelphia Flyers (1970–71)	6–17–2
26	W	December 9, 1970	6–1	Vancouver Canucks (1970–71)	7–17–2
27	L	December 11, 1970	1–2	New York Rangers (1970–71)	7–18–2
28	L	December 12, 1970	2–5	@ Vancouver Canucks (1970–71)	7–19–2
29	W	December 16, 1970	4–2	Detroit Red Wings (1970–71)	8–19–2
30	W	December 18, 1970	1–0	Philadelphia Flyers (1970–71)	9–19–2
31	W	December 20, 1970	7–3	@ Detroit Red Wings (1970–71)	10–19–2
32	W	December 22, 1970	5–2	Chicago Black Hawks (1970–71)	11–19–2
33	L	December 26, 1970	3–9	@ Los Angeles Kings (1970–71)	11–20–2
34	L	December 29, 1970	2–3	@ New York Rangers (1970–71)	11–21–2
35	L	December 30, 1970	1–3	@ Toronto Maple Leafs (1970–71)	11–22–2

January

Game	Result	Date	Score	Opponent	Record
36	L	January 2, 1971	3–5	@ Montreal Canadiens (1970–71)	11–23–2
37	L	January 3, 1971	2–3	@ Detroit Red Wings (1970–71)	11–24–2
38	W	January 6, 1971	6–3	St. Louis Blues (1970–71)	12–24–2
39	L	January 9, 1971	3–5	@ Philadelphia Flyers (1970–71)	12–25–2
40	L	January 10, 1971	4–7	@ Boston Bruins (1970–71)	12–26–2
41	L	January 12, 1971	2–8	@ St. Louis Blues (1970–71)	12–27–2
42	T	January 13, 1971	1–1	@ Toronto Maple Leafs (1970–71)	12–27–3
43	W	January 15, 1971	3–1	New York Rangers (1970–71)	13–27–3
44	L	January 17, 1971	1–3	Vancouver Canucks (1970–71)	13–28–3
45	L	January 20, 1971	2–4	Pittsburgh Penguins (1970–71)	13–29–3
46	W	January 22, 1971	5–2	Toronto Maple Leafs (1970–71)	14–29–3
47	L	January 24, 1971	3–5	@ Chicago Black Hawks (1970–71)	14–30–3
48	W	January 27, 1971	6–2	Minnesota North Stars (1970–71)	15–30–3
49	L	January 29, 1971	2–4	Buffalo Sabres (1970–71)	15–31–3
50	L	January 31, 1971	1–7	@ Minnesota North Stars (1970–71)	15–32–3

February

Game	Result	Date	Score	Opponent	Record
51	L	February 3, 1971	1–6	@ Pittsburgh Penguins (1970–71)	15–33–3
52	L	February 5, 1971	2–3	Montreal Canadiens (1970–71)	15–34–3
53	L	February 7, 1971	2–5	Detroit Red Wings (1970–71)	15–35–3
54	W	February 10, 1971	5–1	Buffalo Sabres (1970–71)	16–35–3
55	L	February 12, 1971	0–3	@ Buffalo Sabres (1970–71)	16–36–3
56	L	February 13, 1971	2–5	@ Montreal Canadiens (1970–71)	16–37–3
57	L	February 16, 1971	1–5	@ St. Louis Blues (1970–71)	16–38–3
58	L	February 17, 1971	2–3	@ Minnesota North Stars (1970–71)	16–39–3
59	L	February 19, 1971	0–5	Boston Bruins (1970–71)	16–40–3
60	W	February 20, 1971	5–3	Philadelphia Flyers (1970–71)	17–40–3
61	L	February 24, 1971	2–5	Montreal Canadiens (1970–71)	17–41–3
62	L	February 26, 1971	1–3	Chicago Black Hawks (1970–71)	17–42–3
63	L	February 28, 1971	3–8	Los Angeles Kings (1970–71)	17–43–3

March

Game	Result	Date	Score	Opponent	Record
64	L	March 3, 1971	1–8	@ New York Rangers (1970–71)	17–44–3
65	L	March 4, 1971	0–7	@ Boston Bruins (1970–71)	17–45–3
66	T	March 6, 1971	4–4	@ Philadelphia Flyers (1970–71)	17–45–4
67	T	March 7, 1971	3–3	@ Pittsburgh Penguins (1970–71)	17–45–5
68	L	March 10, 1971	1–8	Boston Bruins (1970–71)	17–46–5
69	L	March 14, 1971	5–8	Detroit Red Wings (1970–71)	17–47–5
70	W	March 17, 1971	5–2	Pittsburgh Penguins (1970–71)	18–47–5
71	L	March 19, 1971	2–5	Chicago Black Hawks (1970–71)	18–48–5
72	W	March 21, 1971	5–2	Los Angeles Kings (1970–71)	19–48–5
73	L	March 24, 1971	0–6	Toronto Maple Leafs (1970–71)	19–49–5
74	L	March 26, 1971	5–8	St. Louis Blues (1970–71)	19–50–5
75	L	March 28, 1971	5–11	@ Vancouver Canucks (1970–71)	19–51–5
76	W	March 31, 1971	4–1	Minnesota North Stars (1970–71)	20–51–5

April

Game	Result	Date	Score	Opponent	Record
77	L	April 2, 1971	2–7	Vancouver Canucks (1970–71)	20–52–5
78	L	April 3, 1971	4–6	@ Los Angeles Kings (1970–71)	20–53–5

Legend: Win (2 points) Loss (0 points) Tie (1 point)

== Player statistics ==
=== Skaters ===
Note: GP = Games played; G = Goals; A = Assists; Pts = Points; PIM = Penalties in minutes

		Regular season					Playoffs
Player	#	GP	G	A	Pts	PIM	GP	G	A	Pts	PIM
Dennis Hextall	22	78	21	31	52	217	–	–	–	–	–
Ernie Hicke	20	78	22	25	47	62	–	–	–	–	–
Gary Croteau	18	74	15	28	43	12	–	–	–	–	–
Gerry Ehman	8	78	18	18	36	16	–	–	–	–	–
Bill Hicke	9	74	18	17	35	41	–	–	–	–	–
Gary Jarrett	12	75	15	19	34	40	–	–	–	–	–
Ron Stackhouse	21	78	8	24	32	73	–	–	–	–	–
Norm Ferguson	17	54	14	17	31	9	–	–	–	–	–
Ted Hampson‡	10	60	10	20	30	14	–	–	–	–	–
Carol Vadnais	5	42	10	16	26	91	–	–	–	–	–
Don O'Donoghue	11	43	11	9	20	10	–	–	–	–	–
Tom Williams†	26	18	7	10	17	8	–	–	–	–	–
Doug Roberts	2	78	4	13	17	94	–	–	–	–	–
Tony Featherstone	16	67	8	8	16	44	–	–	–	–	–
Joe Hardy	14	40	4	10	14	31	–	–	–	–	–
Wayne Muloin‡	4	66	0	14	14	32	–	–	–	–	–
Earl Ingarfield	7	49	5	8	13	4	–	–	–	–	–
Dick Mattiussi	6	67	3	8	11	38	–	–	–	–	–
Harry Howell‡	3	28	0	9	9	14	–	–	–	–	–
Bert Marshall	19	32	2	6	8	48	–	–	–	–	–
Dick Redmond†	4	11	2	4	6	12	–	–	–	–	–
Paul Andrea‡	23	9	1	0	1	2	–	–	–	–	–
Mike Laughton	15	25	1	0	1	2	–	–	–	–	–
Gary Smith	1	71	0	1	1	6	–	–	–	–	–
Bob Sneddon	30	5	0	0	0	0	–	–	–	–	–
Chris Worthy	30	11	0	0	0	2	–	–	–	–	–
Hilliard Graves	23	14	0	0	0	0	–	–	–	–	–
Barry Boughner	24	16	0	0	0	9	–	–	–	–	–

†Denotes player spent time with another team before joining Seals. Stats reflect time with the Seals only. ‡Traded mid-season

=== Goaltenders ===
Note: GP = Games played; TOI= Time on ice (minutes); W = Wins; L = Losses; T = Ties; GA = Goals against; SO = Shutouts; GAA = Goals against average

		Regular season								Playoffs
Player	#	GP	TOI	W	L	T	GA	SO	GAA	GP	TOI	W	L	GA	SO	GAA
Gary Smith	1	71	3975	19	48	4	256	2	3.86	–	–	–	–	–	–	-.--
Chris Worthy	30	11	480	1	3	1	39	0	4.87	–	–	–	–	–	–	-.--
Bob Sneddon	30	5	225	0	2	0	21	0	5.60	–	–	–	–	–	–	-.--

== Awards and records ==
- Gary Smith, most losses by a goaltender in one season (48)

== Transactions ==
The Seals were involved in the following transactions during the 1970–71 season:

=== Trades ===
May 22, 1970	To Oakland Seals Dennis Hextall	To Montreal Canadiens cash
May 22, 1970	To Oakland Seals Ernie Hicke; 1st round pick in 1970 (Chris Oddleifson)	To Montreal Canadiens Francois Lacombe; 1st round pick in 1971 (Guy Lafleur)
October, 1970	To California Golden Seals cash	To Phoenix Roadrunners (WHL) Gerry Odrowski
February 5, 1971	To California Golden Seals cash	To Los Angeles Kings Harry Howell
March 7, 1971	To California Golden Seals Dick Redmond; Tom Williams	To Minnesota North Stars Ted Hampson; Wayne Muloin

=== Additions and subtractions ===
Additions
Player	Former team	Via
Bob Sneddon	Los Angeles Kings	Reverse draft (1970–06)
Gary Croteau	Detroit Red Wings	Intra-league draft (1970–06–09)
Paul Andrea	Vancouver Canucks	Intra-league draft (1970–06–09)
Hilliard Graves	Charlottetown Islanders (PEI Jr.)	free agency (1970–10)

Subtractions
Player	New team	Via
Bob Dillabough	Vancouver Canucks	Expansion draft (1970–06–10)
Charlie Hodge	Vancouver Canucks	Expansion draft (1970–06–10)
Howie Menard	Buffalo Sabres	Expansion draft (1970–06–10)
Brian Perry	Buffalo Sabres	Expansion draft (1970–06–10)
Paul Andrea	Buffalo Sabres	waivers (1970–11–04)
