= 1970–71 Buffalo Sabres season =

NHL hockey team season (inaugural season)

1970–71 Buffalo Sabres
- Division: 5th East
- 1970–71 record: 24–39–15
- Home record: 16–13–10
- Road record: 8–26–5
- Goals for: 217
- Goals against: 291

Team information
- General manager: Punch Imlach
- Coach: Punch Imlach
- Captain: Floyd Smith
- Alternate captains: Tracy Pratt
- Arena: Buffalo Memorial Auditorium
- Average attendance: 9,721

Team leaders
- Goals: Gilbert Perreault (38)
- Assists: Phil Goyette (46)
- Points: Gilbert Perreault (72)
- Penalty minutes: Tracy Pratt (179)
- Wins: Joe Daley (12)
- Goals against average: Dave Dryden (3.37)

The 1970–71 NHL season was the first season of the Buffalo Sabres in the National Hockey League (NHL).

The Sabres had the first pick in the 1970 NHL amateur draft, which they used to select Gilbert Perreault. Led by Perreault's NHL rookie record of 38 goals, the Sabres would 24–39–15, ahead of the Vancouver Canucks and Detroit Red Wings in the Eastern Division. However, they finished 19 points behind the Toronto Maple Leafs in the division, and finished 19 points short of a playoff berth.

The Sabres played their home games in the Buffalo Memorial Auditorium. "The Aud" was previously home of the Buffalo Bisons AHL team. To make way for the Sabres the Bisons folded following the 1969–70 AHL season, which saw the Bisons win their fifth and final Calder Cup. For the Sabres first season played the Aud had an ice hockey seating capacity of only 12,280 for hockey. The arena would be renovated following the season to expand capacity.

== Offseason ==
The Buffalo Sabres, along with the Vancouver Canucks, joined the NHL in the 1970–71 season. The Sabres' first owners were Seymour and Northrup Knox, scions of a family long prominent in western New York. The team's name, selected through a fan contest, was chosen because it was known as a weapon carried by leaders, and it is also swift and strong on offense as well as defense. The Knoxes had tried twice before to get an NHL team, first when the NHL expanded in 1967, and then unsuccessfully attempting to buy the Oakland Seals with the intent of moving them to Buffalo. At the time of their creation, the Buffalo Sabres exercised their option to create their own AHL farm team, the Cincinnati Swords. On June 9, 1970, the 1970 NHL expansion draft was held to fill the Sabres' and Canucks' rosters.

=== NHL draft ===
In 1970, two new franchises were awarded in the NHL — the Buffalo Sabres and the Vancouver Canucks. Sabres general manager/coach Punch Imlach chose his favorite number, number 11, for the roulette wheel spin to determine which franchise would have the first choice in the 1970 entry draft. Ultimately, the Canucks were allocated numbers 1–10 on the wheel, while the Sabres had 11–20. When league president Clarence Campbell spun the wheel, he initially thought the pointer landed on 1. However, while Campbell was congratulating the Vancouver delegation, Imlach asked Campbell to check again. As it turned out, the pointer was on 11. This was the first year that the Montreal Canadiens did not have a priority right to draft Québécois junior players. Consequently, Perreault was available and taken first overall by the Sabres.

Round	#	Player	Nationality	College/Junior/Club team
1	1	Gilbert Perreault	Canada	Montreal Junior Canadiens (OHA)
2	15	Butch Deadmarsh	Canada	Brandon Wheat Kings (WCHL)
3	29	Steve Cuddie	Canada	Toronto Marlboros (OHA)
4	43	Randy Wyrozub	Canada	Edmonton Oil Kings (WCHL)
5	57	Mike Morton	Canada	Shawinigan Bruins (QMJHL)
6	71	Mike Keeler	Canada	Niagara Falls Flyers (OHA)
7	84	Tim Regan	United States	Boston University (ECAC)
8	97	Doug Rombough	Canada	St. Catharines Black Hawks (OHA)
9	107	Luc Nadeau	Canada	Drummondville Rangers (QMJHL)

== Transactions ==
Date	Details
October 1, 1969	To St. Louis Blues Roger Lafreniere	To Buffalo Sabres Cash
December 9, 1969	To St. Louis Blues George Morrison	To Buffalo Sabres Cash
June 10, 1970	To New York Rangers Cash	To Buffalo Sabres Ted Hodgson
June 10, 1970	To Detroit Red Wings Tom Webster	Buffalo Sabres Roger Crozier
August 31, 1970	To Toronto Maple Leafs Cash	To Buffalo Sabres Floyd Smith; Brent Imlach
October 1, 1970	To St. Louis Blues Gary Edwards on loan	To Buffalo Sabres Cash
October 1, 1970	To California Golden Seals Howie Menard	To Buffalo Sabres Cash
October 2, 1970	To St. Louis Blues Craig Cameron	To Buffalo Sabres Ron Anderson
October 9, 1970	To Pittsburgh Penguins Cash	To Buffalo Sabres Dave Dryden
October 19, 1970	To St. Louis Blues Bill Sutherland	Buffalo Sabres Cash
November 4, 1970	To St. Louis Blues Bob Baun	To Buffalo Sabres Larry Keenan; Jean-Guy Talbot
November 24, 1970	To Los Angeles Kings Mike McMahon Jr. 7th-round pick in 1971 (Pete Harasym); 8th-round pick in 1971 (Lorne Stamler)	To Buffalo Sabres Dick Duff; Eddie Shack
January 24, 1971	To Pittsburgh Penguins Jean-Guy Lagace	To Buffalo Sabres Terry Ball

=== Free Agency ===
September 1970	Signed Murray Kuntz

=== Claimed via Waivers ===
Player	Former team	Date claimed off waivers
Steve Atkinson	St. Louis Blues	November 1, 1970
Bob Baun	Detroit Red Wings	November 3, 1970
Paul Andrea	California Golden Seals	November 1970

=== Lost via Waivers ===
Player	New team	Date claimed off waivers
Cliff Schmautz	Philadelphia Flyers	December 28, 1970

=== 1970 NHL Intraleague Draft ===
Round	#	Player	Nationality	Drafted From
2	18	Kevin O'Shea	Canada	San Diego Gulls (WHL)
2	19	Cliff Schmautz	Canada	Portland Buckaroos (WHL)
2	20	Brian McDonald	Canada	Denver Spurs (WHL)

== Regular season ==
=== Punch Imlach ===
After being fired by the Leafs, it was expected that Imlach would join the NHL's new Vancouver franchise. Imlach, Joe Crozier, and Foster Hewitt had become partners in the Vancouver Canucks of the Western Hockey League and were in line to become owners of the Vancouver NHL team. But they didn't have the financial resources to buy the team, which went to Medical Investment Corporation (Medicor). Medicor bought the WHL Canucks for $2.8 million, with Imlach making a reported gain of more than $250,000. He was offered a job with the NHL Canucks, but instead accepted an offer from the NHL's other expansion team, the Buffalo Sabres, as their first coach and general manager in 1970.

=== Season standings ===
East Division
		GP	W	L	T	GF	GA	DIFF	Pts
1	Boston Bruins	78	57	14	7	399	207	+192	121
2	New York Rangers	78	49	18	11	259	177	+82	109
3	Montreal Canadiens	78	42	23	13	291	216	+75	97
4	Toronto Maple Leafs	78	37	33	8	248	211	+37	82
5	Buffalo Sabres	78	24	39	15	217	291	−74	63
6	Vancouver Canucks	78	24	46	8	229	296	−67	56
7	Detroit Red Wings	78	22	45	11	209	308	−99	55

=== Record vs. opponents ===
==== Vs. East Division ====
1970–71 NHL records
Team	BOS	BUF	DET	MTL	NYR	TOR	VAN	Total
Boston	—	4–1–1	5–1	5–1	2–2–2	5–1	5–1	26–7–3
Buffalo	1–4–1	—	3–3	0–3–3	0–4–2	1–5	3–3	8–22–6
Detroit	1–5	3–3	—	1–4–1	1–4–1	1–4–1	4–2	11–22–3
Montreal	1–5	3–0–3	4–1–1	—	3–3	2–4	4–0–2	17–13–6
New York	2–2–2	4–0–2	4–1–1	3–3	—	5–1	5–1	23–8–5
Toronto	1–5	5–1	4–1–1	4–2	1–5	—	3–3	18–17–1
Vancouver	1–5	3–3	2–4	0–4–2	1–5	3–3	—	10–24–2

==== Vs. West Division ====
1970–71 NHL records
Team	CAL	CHI	LAK	MIN	PHI	PIT	STL	Total
Boston	5–1	2–3–1	5–1	5–0–1	6–0	4–1–1	4–1–1	31–7–4
Buffalo	3–3	0–5–1	2–1–3	5–1	2–3–1	2–0–4	2–4	16–17–9
Detroit	4–2	0–6	1–2–3	2–3–1	3–2–1	1–3–2	0–5–1	11–23–8
Montreal	5–1	3–3	4–2	3–1–2	4–1–1	3–1–2	3–1–2	25–10–7
New York	3–2–1	3–3	4–0–2	6–0	2–3–1	5–0–1	3–2–1	26–6–10
Toronto	3–2–1	3–2–1	3–3	2–2–2	2–3–1	3–2–1	3–2–1	19–16–7
Vancouver	5–1	0–5–1	3–2–1	2–3–1	2–4	1–4–1	1–3–2	14–22–6

== Schedule and results ==
1970–71 regular season
October

Game	Result	Date	Score	Opponent	Record
1	W	October 10, 1970	2–1	@ Pittsburgh Penguins (1970–71)	1–0–0
2	L	October 14, 1970	0–3	@ New York Rangers (1970–71)	1–1–0
3	L	October 15, 1970	0–3	Montreal Canadiens (1970–71)	1–2–0
4	L	October 17, 1970	1–4	@ St. Louis Blues (1970–71)	1–3–0
5	T	October 18, 1970	1–1	Pittsburgh Penguins (1970–71)	1–3–1
6	L	October 22, 1970	2–4	@ Philadelphia Flyers (1970–71)	1–4–1
7	W	October 23, 1970	4–3	Detroit Red Wings (1970–71)	2–4–1
8	L	October 25, 1970	0–4	Chicago Black Hawks (1970–71)	2–5–1
9	L	October 27, 1970	2–7	@ Vancouver Canucks (1970–71)	2–6–1
10	L	October 30, 1970	1–6	@ California Golden Seals (1970–71)	2–7–1

November

Game	Result	Date	Score	Opponent	Record
11	L	November 1, 1970	2–4	@ Los Angeles Kings (1970–71)	2–8–1
12	L	November 5, 1970	1–4	Vancouver Canucks (1970–71)	2–9–1
13	L	November 7, 1970	2–11	@ Montreal Canadiens (1970–71)	2–10–1
14	L	November 8, 1970	1–3	Philadelphia Flyers (1970–71)	2–11–1
15	W	November 13, 1970	4–2	California Golden Seals (1970–71)	3–11–1
16	T	November 15, 1970	2–2	Montreal Canadiens (1970–71)	3–11–2
17	W	November 18, 1970	7–2	@ Toronto Maple Leafs (1970–71)	4–11–2
18	L	November 21, 1970	0–3	@ Minnesota North Stars (1970–71)	4–12–2
19	T	November 25, 1970	4–4	@ Pittsburgh Penguins (1970–71)	4–12–3
20	T	November 26, 1970	2–2	New York Rangers (1970–71)	4–12–4
21	L	November 29, 1970	1–2	California Golden Seals (1970–71)	4–13–4

December

Game	Result	Date	Score	Opponent	Record
22	T	December 3, 1970	4–4	Boston Bruins (1970–71)	4–13–5
23	W	December 6, 1970	1–0	Minnesota North Stars (1970–71)	5–13–5
24	L	December 9, 1970	1–6	@ Chicago Black Hawks (1970–71)	5–14–5
25	L	December 10, 1970	2–8	@ Boston Bruins (1970–71)	5–15–5
26	L	December 12, 1970	3–5	@ Detroit Red Wings (1970–71)	5–16–5
27	L	December 13, 1970	0–4	Toronto Maple Leafs (1970–71)	5–17–5
28	L	December 16, 1970	0–4	@ New York Rangers (1970–71)	5–18–5
29	W	December 17, 1970	4–3	Los Angeles Kings (1970–71)	6–18–5
30	L	December 19, 1970	0–2	@ Toronto Maple Leafs (1970–71)	6–19–5
31	L	December 20, 1970	2–4	Toronto Maple Leafs (1970–71)	6–20–5
32	L	December 22, 1970	2–7	New York Rangers (1970–71)	6–21–5
33	T	December 26, 1970	4–4	@ Montreal Canadiens (1970–71)	6–21–6
34	W	December 27, 1970	5–2	Detroit Red Wings (1970–71)	7–21–6

January

Game	Result	Date	Score	Opponent	Record
35	L	January 1, 1971	4–9	Boston Bruins (1970–71)	7–22–6
36	L	January 3, 1971	3–5	Chicago Black Hawks (1970–71)	7–23–6
37	W	January 7, 1971	7–4	Detroit Red Wings (1970–71)	8–23–6
38	L	January 9, 1971	2–3	@ Detroit Red Wings (1970–71)	8–24–6
39	T	January 10, 1971	2–2	Los Angeles Kings (1970–71)	8–24–7
40	L	January 13, 1971	2–4	@ Chicago Black Hawks (1970–71)	8–25–7
41	W	January 14, 1971	2–1	St. Louis Blues (1970–71)	9–25–7
42	W	January 16, 1971	4–3	@ Minnesota North Stars (1970–71)	10–25–7
43	T	January 17, 1971	4–4	Montreal Canadiens (1970–71)	10–25–8
44	T	January 21, 1971	5–5	New York Rangers (1970–71)	10–25–9
45	L	January 23, 1971	1–7	@ St. Louis Blues (1970–71)	10–26–9
46	W	January 24, 1971	6–4	Philadelphia Flyers (1970–71)	11–26–9
47	T	January 27, 1971	3–3	@ Los Angeles Kings (1970–71)	11–26–10
48	W	January 29, 1971	4–2	@ California Golden Seals (1970–71)	12–26–10
49	W	January 31, 1971	6–1	@ Vancouver Canucks (1970–71)	13–26–10

February

Game	Result	Date	Score	Opponent	Record
50	W	February 4, 1971	5–2	Los Angeles Kings (1970–71)	14–26–10
51	L	February 6, 1971	3–4	@ Boston Bruins (1970–71)	14–27–10
52	L	February 7, 1971	3–4	Toronto Maple Leafs (1970–71)	14–28–10
53	L	February 9, 1971	3–6	@ Vancouver Canucks (1970–71)	14–29–10
54	L	February 10, 1971	1–5	@ California Golden Seals (1970–71)	14–30–10
55	W	February 12, 1971	3–0	California Golden Seals (1970–71)	15–30–10
56	W	February 14, 1971	3–2	Philadelphia Flyers (1970–71)	16–30–10
57	L	February 17, 1971	1–5	@ Chicago Black Hawks (1970–71)	16–31–10
58	T	February 18, 1971	6–6	Pittsburgh Penguins (1970–71)	16–31–11
59	L	February 20, 1971	5–6	@ Detroit Red Wings (1970–71)	16–32–11
60	L	February 21, 1971	1–3	St. Louis Blues (1970–71)	16–33–11
61	L	February 23, 1971	3–6	Boston Bruins (1970–71)	16–34–11
62	L	February 25, 1971	2–3	@ Philadelphia Flyers (1970–71)	16–35–11
63	L	February 27, 1971	0–2	@ Toronto Maple Leafs (1970–71)	16–36–11
64	W	February 28, 1971	5–2	Minnesota North Stars (1970–71)	17–36–11

March

Game	Result	Date	Score	Opponent	Record
65	T	March 3, 1971	3–3	@ Los Angeles Kings (1970–71)	17–36–12
66	T	March 5, 1971	2–2	Chicago Black Hawks (1970–71)	17–36–13
67	W	March 7, 1971	6–3	Vancouver Canucks (1970–71)	18–36–13
68	L	March 13, 1971	0–9	@ St. Louis Blues (1970–71)	18–37–13
69	W	March 14, 1971	5–0	@ Minnesota North Stars (1970–71)	19–37–13
70	W	March 18, 1971	5–3	St. Louis Blues (1970–71)	20–37–13
71	L	March 20, 1971	2–5	@ Montreal Canadiens (1970–71)	20–38–13
72	W	March 21, 1971	7–5	@ Boston Bruins (1970–71)	21–38–13
73	L	March 23, 1971	2–7	@ New York Rangers (1970–71)	21–39–13
74	W	March 26, 1971	3–1	Vancouver Canucks (1970–71)	22–39–13
75	W	March 28, 1971	4–2	Minnesota North Stars (1970–71)	23–39–13
76	W	March 31, 1971	6–4	@ Pittsburgh Penguins (1970–71)	24–39–13

April

Game	Result	Date	Score	Opponent	Record
77	T	April 1, 1971	3–3	Pittsburgh Penguins (1970–71)	24–39–14
78	T	April 4, 1971	3–3	@ Philadelphia Flyers (1970–71)	24–39–15

Legend: Win (2 points) Loss (0 points) Tie (1 point)

== Player statistics ==
=== Forwards ===
Note: GP = Games played; G = Goals; A = Assists; Pts = Points; PIM = Penalty minutes

Player	GP	G	A	Pts	PIM
Gilbert Perreault	78	38	34	72	19
Phil Goyette	60	15	46	61	6
Gerry Meehan	77	24	31	55	8
Don Marshall	62	20	29	49	6
Eddie Shack	56	25	17	42	93
Steve Atkinson	57	20	18	38	12
Paul Andrea	47	11	21	32	4
Al Hamilton	69	2	28	30	71
Larry Keenan	51	7	20	27	6
Doug Barrie	75	4	23	27	168
Ron Anderson	74	14	12	26	44
Dick Duff	53	7	13	20	12
Floyd Smith	77	6	11	17	46
Reg Fleming	78	6	10	16	159
Jim Watson	78	2	9	11	147
Skip Krake	74	4	5	9	68
Tracy Pratt	76	1	7	8	179

=== Defencemen ===
Note: GP = Games played; G = Goals; A = Assists; Pts = Points; PIM = Penalty minutes

Player	GP	G	A	Pts	PIM
Hap Myers	13	0	0	0	6
Mike McMahon	12	0	0	0	4
Paul Terbenche	3	0	0	0	2
Jean-Guy Lagace	3	0	0	0	2
Terry Ball	2	0	0	0	0
Francois Lacombe	1	0	1	1	2
Jean-Guy Talbot	57	0	7	7	36
Tracy Pratt	76	1	7	8	179
Jim Watson	78	2	9	11	147
Reg Fleming	78	6	10	16	159
Doug Barrie	75	4	23	27	168
Al Hamilton	69	2	28	30	71

=== Goaltending ===
Note: GP = Games played; W = Wins; L = Losses; T = Ties; SO = Shutouts; GAA = Goals against average

Player	GP	W	L	T	SO	GAA
Dave Dryden	10	3	3	0	1	3.37
Roger Crozier	44	9	20	7	1	3.68
Joe Daley	38	12	16	8	1	3.70

== Awards and records ==
- Calder Memorial Trophy: Gilbert Perreault
