= 1970–71 Philadelphia Flyers season =

NHL hockey team season

1970–71 Philadelphia Flyers
- Division: 3rd West
- 1970–71 record: 28–33–17
- Home record: 20–10–9
- Road record: 8–23–8
- Goals for: 207 (12th)
- Goals against: 225 (8th)

Team information
- General manager: Keith Allen
- Coach: Vic Stasiuk
- Captain: Ed Van Impe
- Alternate captains: Jean-Guy Gendron; Bill Sutherland
- Arena: Spectrum
- Average attendance: 14,131
- Minor league affiliates: Quebec Aces; Flint Generals; Jersey Devils

Team leaders
- Goals: Bobby Clarke (27)
- Assists: Bobby Clarke (36)
- Points: Bobby Clarke (63)
- Penalty minutes: Gary Dornhoefer (93)
- Plus/minus: Wayne Hillman (+12)
- Wins: Doug Favell (16)
- Goals against average: Doug Favell (2.67)

The 1970–71 Philadelphia Flyers season was the franchise's fourth season in the National Hockey League (NHL). The Flyers lost in the quarterfinals to the Chicago Black Hawks in a four-game sweep.

== Regular season ==
Bobby Clarke led the team in goals (27), assists (36), and points (63) in his second season.

=== Season standings ===
West Division
		GP	W	L	T	GF	GA	DIFF	Pts
1	Chicago Black Hawks	78	49	20	9	277	184	+93	107
2	St. Louis Blues	78	34	25	19	223	208	+15	87
3	Philadelphia Flyers	78	28	33	17	207	225	−18	73
4	Minnesota North Stars	78	28	34	16	191	223	−32	72
5	Los Angeles Kings	78	25	40	13	239	303	−64	63
6	Pittsburgh Penguins	78	21	37	20	221	240	−19	62
7	California Golden Seals	78	20	53	5	199	320	−121	45

=== Record vs. opponents ===
==== Vs. West Division ====
1970–71 NHL records
Team	CAL	CHI	LAK	MIN	PHI	PIT	STL	Total
California	—	1–5	1–5	2–4	2–3–1	1–4–1	1–4–1	8–25–3
Chicago	5–1	—	4–2	3–2–1	4–1–1	4–2	2–1–3	22–9–5
Los Angeles	5–1	2–4	—	0–5–1	1–2–3	4–2	2–4	14–18–4
Minnesota	4–2	2–3–1	5–0–1	—	1–2–3	3–1–2	3–1–2	18–9–9
Philadelphia	3–2–1	1–4–1	2–1–3	2–1–3	—	3–1–2	1–3–2	12–12–12
Pittsburgh	4–1–1	2–4	2–4	1–3–2	1–3–2	—	0–3–3	10–18–8
St. Louis	4–1–1	1–2–3	4–2	1–3–2	3–1–2	3–0–3	—	16–9–11

==== Vs. East Division ====
1970–71 NHL records
Team	BOS	BUF	DET	MTL	NYR	TOR	VAN	Total
California	1–5	3–3	2–4	1–5	2–3–1	2–3–1	1–5	12–28–2
Chicago	3–2–1	5–0–1	6–0	3–3	3–3	2–3–1	5–0–1	27–11–4
Los Angeles	1–5	1–2–3	2–1–3	2–4	0–4–2	3–3	2–3–1	11–22–9
Minnesota	0–5–1	1–5	3–2–1	1–3–2	0–6	2–2–2	3–2–1	10–25–7
Philadelphia	0–6	3–2–1	2–3–1	1–4–1	3–2–1	3–2–1	4–2	16–21–5
Pittsburgh	1–4–1	0–2–4	3–1–2	1–3–2	0–5–1	2–3–1	4–1–1	11–19–12
St. Louis	1–4–1	4–2	5–0–1	1–3–2	2–3–1	2–3–1	3–1–2	18–16–8

== Playoffs ==
The Flyers were swept in four games by the Chicago Black Hawks in the first round. Even though the team had improved their record in his second season behind the bench, head coach Vic Stasiuk was replaced by Fred Shero in the off-season.

== Schedule and results ==
=== Regular season ===
1970–71 regular season
October: 5–3–1, 11 points (home: 5–1–0; road: 0–2–1)

Game	Date	Score	Opponent	Decision	Record	Points	Recap
1	October 10	2–1	Minnesota North Stars	Favell	1–0–0	2	W
2	October 11	1–2	Montreal Canadiens	Parent	1–1–0	2	L
3	October 15	5–4	Vancouver Canucks	Favell	2–1–0	4	W
4	October 17	0–0	@ Pittsburgh Penguins	Parent	2–1–1	5	T
5	October 18	4–2	Toronto Maple Leafs	Favell	3–1–1	7	W
6	October 22	4–2	Buffalo Sabres	Parent	4–1–1	9	W
7	October 24	1–3	@ Montreal Canadiens	Favell	4–2–1	9	L
8	October 25	3–4	@ Boston Bruins	Parent	4–3–1	9	L
9	October 29	3–1	Los Angeles Kings	Favell	5–3–1	11	W

November: 5–6–1, 11 points (home: 4–3–1; road: 1–3–0)

Game	Date	Score	Opponent	Decision	Record	Points	Recap
10	November 1	3–2	Pittsburgh Penguins	Parent	6–3–1	13	W
11	November 5	1–3	@ Detroit Red Wings	Favell	6–4–1	13	L
12	November 7	1–1	Chicago Black Hawks	Parent	6–4–2	14	T
13	November 8	3–1	@ Buffalo Sabres	Favell	7–4–2	16	W
14	November 11	1–7	@ Chicago Black Hawks	Parent	7–5–2	16	L
15	November 15	1–2	St. Louis Blues	Favell	7–6–2	16	L
16	November 19	6–2	California Golden Seals	Parent	8–6–2	18	W
17	November 21	2–5	Boston Bruins	Parent	8–7–2	18	L
18	November 22	2–4	Detroit Red Wings	Parent	8–8–2	18	L
19	November 25	3–1	New York Rangers	Parent	9–8–2	20	W
20	November 28	1–3	@ Chicago Black Hawks	Parent	9–9–2	20	L
21	November 29	4–2	Vancouver Canucks	Parent	10–9–2	22	W

December: 2–8–3, 7 points (home: 0–2–1; road: 0–6–2)

Game	Date	Score	Opponent	Decision	Record	Points	Recap
22	December 1	4–5	@ Vancouver Canucks	Parent	10–10–2	22	L
23	December 4	4–0	@ California Golden Seals	Parent	11–10–2	24	W
24	December 5	4–4	@ Los Angeles Kings	Parent	11–10–3	25	T
25	December 9	5–2	@ St. Louis Blues	Favell	12–10–3	27	W
26	December 10	1–3	@ Detroit Red Wings	Parent	12–11–3	27	L
27	December 12	0–1	Boston Bruins	Favell	12–12–3	27	L
28	December 13	2–2	St. Louis Blues	Parent	12–12–4	28	T
29	December 15	2–3	@ Vancouver Canucks	Favell	12–13–4	28	L
30	December 18	0–1	@ California Golden Seals	Parent	12–14–4	28	L
31	December 19	2–2	@ Los Angeles Kings	Favell	12–14–5	29	T
32	December 26	1–9	@ Toronto Maple Leafs	Parent	12–15–5	29	L
33	December 27	2–4	Montreal Canadiens	Favell	12–16–5	29	L
34	December 30	2–5	@ St. Louis Blues	Favell	12–17–5	29	L

January: 7–5–4, 18 points (home: 5–3–2; road: 2–2–2)

Game	Date	Score	Opponent	Decision	Record	Points	Recap
35	January 2	1–3	Chicago Black Hawks	Parent	12–18–5	29	L
36	January 3	1–5	Boston Bruins	Favell	12–19–5	29	L
37	January 6	4–3	Pittsburgh Penguins	Parent	13–19–5	31	W
38	January 7	5–5	Los Angeles Kings	Favell	13–19–6	32	T
39	January 9	5–3	California Golden Seals	Parent	14–19–6	34	W
40	January 10	3–2	@ Montreal Canadiens	Favell	15–19–6	36	W
41	January 14	3–0	Toronto Maple Leafs	Favell	16–19–6	38	W
42	January 16	4–2	@ Detroit Red Wings	Parent	17–19–6	40	W
43	January 17	1–4	Los Angeles Kings	Favell	17–20–6	40	L
44	January 20	3–3	@ New York Rangers	Parent	17–20–7	41	T
45	January 21	5–5	Montreal Canadiens	Favell	17–20–8	42	T
46	January 23	2–2	@ Minnesota North Stars	Parent	17–20–9	43	T
47	January 24	4–6	@ Buffalo Sabres	Favell	17–21–9	43	L
48	January 28	2–6	@ Boston Bruins	Parent	17–22–9	43	L
49	January 30	5–2	New York Rangers	Favell	18–22–9	45	W
50	January 31	3–1	Detroit Red Wings	Favell	19–22–9	47	W

February: 5–6–1, 11 points (home: 3–1–0; road: 2–5–1)

Game	Date	Score	Opponent	Decision	Record	Points	Recap
51	February 4	6–2	Chicago Black Hawks	Favell	20–22–9	49	W
52	February 6	2–4	@ Toronto Maple Leafs	Gamble	20–23–9	49	L
53	February 7	2–6	St. Louis Blues	Favell	20–24–9	49	L
54	February 10	3–5	@ Pittsburgh Penguins	Gamble	20–25–9	49	L
55	February 13	2–2	@ Minnesota North Stars	Favell	20–25–10	50	T
56	February 14	2–3	@ Buffalo Sabres	Favell	20–26–10	50	L
57	February 17	4–0	@ Los Angeles Kings	Favell	21–26–10	52	W
58	February 19	3–2	@ Vancouver Canucks	Favell	22–26–10	54	W
59	February 20	3–5	@ California Golden Seals	Gamble	22–27–10	54	L
60	February 24	2–4	@ New York Rangers	Favell	22–28–10	54	L
61	February 25	3–2	Buffalo Sabres	Favell	23–28–10	56	W
62	February 27	8–1	Vancouver Canucks	Favell	24–28–10	58	W

March: 3–5–5, 11 points (home: 2–0–4; road: 1–5–1)

Game	Date	Score	Opponent	Decision	Record	Points	Recap
63	March 4	2–2	Detroit Red Wings	Favell	24–28–11	59	T
64	March 6	4–4	California Golden Seals	Favell	24–28–12	60	T
65	March 7	1–3	@ Minnesota North Stars	Favell	24–29–12	60	L
66	March 10	2–2	@ Pittsburgh Penguins	Favell	24–29–13	61	T
67	March 12	2–7	@ New York Rangers	Gamble	24–30–13	61	L
68	March 13	3–2	@ Toronto Maple Leafs	Favell	25–30–13	63	W
69	March 18	2–1	New York Rangers	Gamble	26–30–13	65	W
70	March 20	3–5	@ Boston Bruins	Gamble	26–31–13	65	L
71	March 21	1–1	Toronto Maple Leafs	Gamble	26–31–14	66	T
72	March 24	3–5	@ Montreal Canadiens	Gamble	26–32–14	66	L
73	March 25	2–2	Minnesota North Stars	Gamble	26–32–15	67	T
74	March 27	1–3	@ Chicago Black Hawks	Favell	26–33–15	67	L
75	March 28	3–1	Pittsburgh Penguins	Gamble	27–33–15	69	W

April: 1–0–2, 4 points (home: 1–0–1; road: 0–0–1)

Game	Date	Score	Opponent	Decision	Record	Points	Recap
76	April 1	1–1	@ St. Louis Blues	Favell	27–33–16	70	T
77	April 3	3–2	Minnesota North Stars	Gamble	28–33–16	72	W
78	April 4	3–3	Buffalo Sabres	Favell	28–33–17	73	T

Legend: W Win (2 points) L Loss (0 points) T Tie (1 point)

=== Playoffs ===
1971 Stanley Cup playoffs
Quarterfinals vs. Chicago Black Hawks – Black Hawks win 4–0

Game	Date	Score	Opponent	Decision	Series	Recap
1	April 7	2–5	@ Chicago Black Hawks	Favell	Black Hawks lead 1–0	L
2	April 8	2–6	@ Chicago Black Hawks	Gamble	Black Hawks lead 2–0	L
3	April 10	2–3	Chicago Black Hawks	Favell	Black Hawks lead 3–0	L
4	April 11	2–6	Chicago Black Hawks	Gamble	Black Hawks win 4–0	L

Legend: W Win L Loss

== Player statistics ==
=== Scoring ===
- Position abbreviations: C = Center; D = Defense; G = Goaltender; LW = Left wing; RW = Right wing
- † = Joined team via a transaction (e.g., trade, waivers, signing) during the season. Stats reflect time with the Flyers only.
- ‡ = Left team via a transaction (e.g., trade, waivers, release) during the season. Stats reflect time with the Flyers only.

No.	Player	Pos	Regular season						Playoffs					
No.	Player	Pos	GP	G	A	Pts	+/-	PIM	GP	G	A	Pts	+/-	PIM
16	Bobby Clarke	C	77	27	36	63	9	78	4	0	0	0	−3	2
21	Serge Bernier	RW	77	23	28	51	−7	77	4	1	1	2	−4	0
20	Jim Johnson	C	66	16	29	45	−10	16	4	0	2	2	−2	0
7	Andre Lacroix	C	78	20	22	42	−9	12	4	0	2	2	−1	0
12	Gary Dornhoefer	RW	57	20	20	40	3	93	2	0	0	0	−1	4
11	Jean-Guy Gendron	LW	76	20	16	36	−9	46	4	0	1	1	−3	0
18	Bill Lesuk	LW	78	17	19	36	−5	81	4	1	0	1	−3	8
9	Bob Kelly	LW	76	14	18	32	7	70	4	1	0	1	0	2
17	Simon Nolet	RW	74	9	19	28	−1	42	4	2	1	3	−4	0
4	Barry Ashbee	D	64	4	23	27	3	44	—	—	—	—	—	—
10	Cliff Schmautz†	RW	30	8	12	20	3	23	—	—	—	—	—	—
3	Larry Hillman	D	73	3	13	16	9	39	4	0	2	2	−2	2
15	Garry Peters	C	73	6	7	13	−14	69	4	1	1	2	−1	15
6	Wayne Hillman	D	69	5	7	12	12	47	—	—	—	—	—	—
8	Lew Morrison	RW	78	5	7	12	−12	25	4	0	0	0	−2	2
23	Larry Hale	D	70	1	11	12	−18	34	4	0	0	0	−4	2
5	Brent Hughes	D	30	1	10	11	−6	21	4	0	0	0	−3	6
2	Ed Van Impe	D	77	0	11	11	−13	80	4	0	1	1	−4	8
14	Joe Watson	D	57	3	7	10	9	50	1	0	0	0	0	0
19	Rick MacLeish†	LW	26	2	4	6	−4	19	4	1	0	1	−2	0
19	Earl Heiskala	LW	41	2	1	3	−9	72	—	—	—	—	—	—
22	Danny Schock†	LW	14	1	2	3	1	0	—	—	—	—	—	—
30	Bernie Parent‡	G	30	0	2	2		5	—	—	—	—	—	—
1	Doug Favell	G	44	0	1	1		9	2	0	0	0		0
25	Willie Brossart	D	1	0	0	0	−2	0	—	—	—	—	—	—
30	Bruce Gamble†	G	11	0	0	0		0	2	0	0	0		0
25	Jim Mair	D	2	0	0	0	−1	0	3	1	2	3	−2	4
10	Bill Sutherland‡	LW	1	0	0	0	0	0	—	—	—	—	—	—
22	George Swarbrick	RW	2	0	0	0	−2	0	—	—	—	—	—	—
4	Ralph MacSweyn	D	—	—	—	—	—	—	4	0	0	0	−2	2

=== Goaltending ===
- † = Joined team via a transaction (e.g., trade, waivers, signing) during the season. Stats reflect time with the Flyers only.
- ‡ = Left team via a transaction (e.g., trade, waivers, release) during the season. Stats reflect time with the Flyers only.

No.	Player	Regular season											Playoffs									
No.	Player	GP	GS	W	L	T	SA	GA	GAA	SV%	SO	TOI	GP	GS	W	L	SA	GA	GAA	SV%	SO	TOI
1	Doug Favell	44	41	16	15	9	1275	108	2.67	.915	2	2,428	2	2	0	2	60	8	4.02	.867	0	119
30	Bernie Parent‡	30	26	9	12	6	825	73	2.77	.912	2	1,581	—	—	—	—	—	—	—	—	—	—
30	Bruce Gamble†	11	11	3	6	2	373	37	3.37	.901	0	658	2	2	0	2	67	12	6.01	.821	0	120

== Awards and records ==
=== Awards ===
Type	Award/honor	Recipient	Ref
League (in-season)	NHL All-Star Game selection	Bobby Clarke	

=== Records ===
The Flyers were swept in their first round series with the Chicago Black Hawks, going winless in the playoffs for the second time, which matched the 1968–69 season and was later matched during the 1982–83 and 1983–84 seasons.

=== Milestones ===
Milestone	Player	Date	Ref
First game	Bob Kelly	October 10, 1970	
First game	Rick MacLeish	February 4, 1971	
First game	Willie Brossart	March 12, 1971	
First game	Jim Mair	March 21, 1971	

=== Franchise firsts ===
Milestone	Player	Date	Ref
Natural hat-trick	Gary Dornhoefer	March 6, 1971	

== Transactions ==
The Flyers were involved in the following transactions from May 11, 1970, the day after the deciding game of the 1970 Stanley Cup Final, through May 18, 1971, the day of the deciding game of the 1971 Stanley Cup Final.

=== Trades ===
Date	Details		Ref
May 20, 1970	To Philadelphia Flyers: Brent Hughes	To Los Angeles Kings: Mike Byers	
May 29, 1970	To Philadelphia Flyers: Barry Ashbee	To Hershey Bears (AHL): Larry McKillop; Player to be named later (Note: Darryl Edestrand on June 15.)	
June 12, 1970	To Philadelphia Flyers: George Swarbrick	To Pittsburgh Penguins: Terry Ball	
July 2, 1970	To Philadelphia Flyers: cash	To San Diego Gulls (WHL): Bob Courcy	
August 1970	To Philadelphia Flyers: cash	To Denver Spurs (WHL): Claude LaForge	
August 10, 1970	To Philadelphia Flyers	To Phoenix Roadrunners (WHL): Loan of Guy Dufour	
January 31, 1971	To Philadelphia Flyers: Bruce Gamble; Mike Walton; 1st-round pick in 1971	To Toronto Maple Leafs: Bernie Parent; 2nd-round pick in 1971	
January 31, 1971	To Philadelphia Flyers: Rick MacLeish; Danny Schock	To Boston Bruins: Mike Walton	

=== Players acquired ===
Date	Player	Former team	Via	Ref
June 1970	Hugh Harvey	Kingston Aces (OHA)	Free agency	
June 9, 1970	Bill Lesuk	Boston Bruins	Intra-league draft	
June 11, 1970	Alain Caron	Montreal Canadiens	Reverse draft (Note: Caron was claimed by the San Diego Gulls.)	
December 28, 1970	Cliff Schmautz	Buffalo Sabres	Waivers	

=== Players lost ===
Date	Player	New team	Via	Ref
June 9, 1970	Dick Cherry	Boston Bruins	Intra-league draft	
June 10, 1970	Reg Fleming	Buffalo Sabres	Expansion draft	
June 10, 1970	Gerry Meehan	Buffalo Sabres	Expansion draft	
June 10, 1970	Rosaire Paiement	Vancouver Canucks	Expansion draft	
June 10, 1970	Dunc Wilson	Vancouver Canucks	Expansion draft	
June 11, 1970	Hugh Harvey	Hershey Bears (AHL)	Reverse draft	
September 14, 1970	Myron Stankiewicz		Retirement	
October 19, 1970	Bill Sutherland	Buffalo Sabres	Waivers	

=== Signings ===
Date	Player	Ref
August 13, 1970	Bill Lesuk	
September 7, 1970	Earl Heiskala	
September 7, 1970	Jim Johnson	
September 7, 1970	Lew Morrison	
September 9, 1970	Larry Hale	
September 9, 1970	Joe Watson	
October 5, 1970	Doug Favell	
October 5, 1970	Larry Hillman	
October 5, 1970	Wayne Hillman	

== Draft picks ==
Philadelphia's picks at the 1970 NHL amateur draft, which was held at the Queen Elizabeth Hotel in Montreal on June 11, 1970. The Flyers were without a first-round draft pick due to having traded it three years previously to the Boston Bruins for Rosaire Paiement. The Bruins used the pick, fourth overall, to select Rick MacLeish, who the Flyers would acquire seven months later in a trade with the Bruins.

Round	Pick	Player	Position	Nationality	Team (league)
2	18	Bill Clement	Center	Canada	Ottawa 67's (OHA)
3	32	Bob Kelly	Left wing	Canada	Oshawa Generals (OHA)
4	46	Jacques Lapierre	Defense	Canada	Shawinigan Bruins (QMJHL)
5	60	Doug Kerslake	Right wing	Canada	Edmonton Oil Kings (WCHL)
6	74	Dennis Giannini	Left wing	Canada	London Knights (OHA)
7	87	Hank Nowak	Left wing	Canada	Oshawa Generals (OHA)
8	99	Gary Cunningham	Defense	Canada	St. Catharines Black Hawks (OHA)
9	109	Jean Daigle	Left wing	Canada	Sorel Black Hawks (QMJHL)

== Farm teams ==
The Flyers were affiliated with the Quebec Aces of the AHL, the Flint Generals of the IHL, and the Jersey Devils of the EHL.
