= 1970–71 Pittsburgh Penguins season =

NHL team season

1970–71 Pittsburgh Penguins
- Division: 6th West
- 1970–71 record: 21–37–20
- Home record: 18–12–9
- Road record: 3–25–11
- Goals for: 221
- Goals against: 240

Team information
- General manager: Red Kelly
- Coach: Red Kelly
- Captain: Vacant
- Alternate captains: Keith McCreary; Duane Rupp; Ken Schinkel; Bob Woytowich
- Arena: Pittsburgh Civic Arena
- Average attendance: 9,671

Team leaders
- Goals: Jean Pronovost (21)
- Assists: Bryan Hextall (32)
- Points: Bryan Hextall (48)
- Penalty minutes: Bryan Hextall (133)
- Wins: Les Binkley (11)
- Goals against average: Les Binkley (2.85)

The 1970–71 Pittsburgh Penguins season was the franchise's fourth season in the National Hockey League (NHL). After making their first postseason appearance the previous season, the Penguins failed to reach the playoffs for the first time since the 1968–69 season.

== Regular season ==
=== Final standings ===
West Division
		GP	W	L	T	GF	GA	DIFF	Pts
1	Chicago Black Hawks	78	49	20	9	277	184	+93	107
2	St. Louis Blues	78	34	25	19	223	208	+15	87
3	Philadelphia Flyers	78	28	33	17	207	225	−18	73
4	Minnesota North Stars	78	28	34	16	191	223	−32	72
5	Los Angeles Kings	78	25	40	13	239	303	−64	63
6	Pittsburgh Penguins	78	21	37	20	221	240	−19	62
7	California Golden Seals	78	20	53	5	199	320	−121	45

=== Record vs. opponents ===
==== Vs. West Division ====
1970–71 NHL records
Team	CAL	CHI	LAK	MIN	PHI	PIT	STL	Total
California	—	1–5	1–5	2–4	2–3–1	1–4–1	1–4–1	8–25–3
Chicago	5–1	—	4–2	3–2–1	4–1–1	4–2	2–1–3	22–9–5
Los Angeles	5–1	2–4	—	0–5–1	1–2–3	4–2	2–4	14–18–4
Minnesota	4–2	2–3–1	5–0–1	—	1–2–3	3–1–2	3–1–2	18–9–9
Philadelphia	3–2–1	1–4–1	2–1–3	2–1–3	—	3–1–2	1–3–2	12–12–12
Pittsburgh	4–1–1	2–4	2–4	1–3–2	1–3–2	—	0–3–3	10–18–8
St. Louis	4–1–1	1–2–3	4–2	1–3–2	3–1–2	3–0–3	—	16–9–11

==== Vs. East Division ====
1970–71 NHL records
Team	BOS	BUF	DET	MTL	NYR	TOR	VAN	Total
California	1–5	3–3	2–4	1–5	2–3–1	2–3–1	1–5	12–28–2
Chicago	3–2–1	5–0–1	6–0	3–3	3–3	2–3–1	5–0–1	27–11–4
Los Angeles	1–5	1–2–3	2–1–3	2–4	0–4–2	3–3	2–3–1	11–22–9
Minnesota	0–5–1	1–5	3–2–1	1–3–2	0–6	2–2–2	3–2–1	10–25–7
Philadelphia	0–6	3–2–1	2–3–1	1–4–1	3–2–1	3–2–1	4–2	16–21–5
Pittsburgh	1–4–1	0–2–4	3–1–2	1–3–2	0–5–1	2–3–1	4–1–1	11–19–12
St. Louis	1–4–1	4–2	5–0–1	1–3–2	2–3–1	2–3–1	3–1–2	18–16–8

== Schedule and results ==
1970–71 regular season
October: 2–4–3 (home: 1–2–1; road: 1–2–2), 7 points

#	Date	Visitor	Score	Home	Location (Attendance)	Record	Points
1	Oct 10	Buffalo Sabres	2–1	Pittsburgh Penguins	Civic Arena (11,189)	0–1–0	0
2	Oct 15	Pittsburgh Penguins	2–4	Minnesota North Stars	Met Center (12,134)	0–2–0	0
3	Oct 17	Philadelphia Flyers	0–0	Pittsburgh Penguins	Civic Arena (7,535)	0–2–1	1
4	Oct 18	Pittsburgh Penguins	1–1	Buffalo Sabres	Buffalo Memorial Auditorium (8,656)	0–2–2	2
5	Oct 21	Pittsburgh Penguins	2–4	Los Angeles Kings	The Forum (6,903)	0–3–2	2
6	Oct 23	Pittsburgh Penguins	3–1	California Golden Seals	Oakland Coliseum Arena (4,043)	1–3–2	4
7	Oct 25	Pittsburgh Penguins	1–1	Vancouver Canucks	Pacific Coliseum (13,329)	1–3–3	5
8	Oct 28	Los Angeles Kings	3–5	Pittsburgh Penguins	Civic Arena (5,028)	2–3–3	7
9	Oct 31	Chicago Black Hawks	5–2	Pittsburgh Penguins	Civic Arena (8,412)	2–4–3	7

November: 3–6–5 (home: 3–2–2; road: 0–4–3), 11 points

#	Date	Visitor	Score	Home	Location (Attendance)	Record	Points
10	Nov 1	Pittsburgh Penguins	2–3	Philadelphia Flyers	The Spectrum (14,620)	2–5–3	7
11	Nov 4	Vancouver Canucks	3–8	Pittsburgh Penguins	Civic Arena (5,029)	3–5–3	9
12	Nov 7	Boston Bruins	2–2	Pittsburgh Penguins	Civic Arena (12,909)	3–5–4	10
13	Nov 8	Pittsburgh Penguins	3–3	Detroit Red Wings	Olympia Stadium (12,662)	3–5–5	11
14	Nov 10	Los Angeles Kings	5–1	Pittsburgh Penguins	Civic Arena (8,089)	3–6–5	11
15	Nov 11	Pittsburgh Penguins	3–3	New York Rangers	Madison Square Garden (IV) (17,250)	3–6–6	12
16	Nov 14	California Golden Seals	1–6	Pittsburgh Penguins	Civic Arena (11,075)	4–6–6	14
17	Nov 19	St. Louis Blues	1–0	Pittsburgh Penguins	Civic Arena (9,027)	4–7–6	14
18	Nov 21	Detroit Red Wings	1–6	Pittsburgh Penguins	Civic Arena (11,298)	5–7–6	16
19	Nov 22	Pittsburgh Penguins	2–4	Boston Bruins	Boston Garden (14,994)	5–8–6	16
20	Nov 24	Pittsburgh Penguins	4–4	Toronto Maple Leafs	Maple Leaf Gardens (16,384)	5–8–7	17
21	Nov 25	Buffalo Sabres	4–4	Pittsburgh Penguins	Civic Arena (9,705)	5–8–8	18
22	Nov 28	Pittsburgh Penguins	1–5	Montreal Canadiens	Montreal Forum (16,838)	5–9–8	18
23	Nov 29	Pittsburgh Penguins	2–6	New York Rangers	Madison Square Garden (IV) (17,250)	5–10–8	18

December: 5–7–3 (home: 5–2–1; road: 0–5–2), 13 points

#	Date	Visitor	Score	Home	Location (Attendance)	Record	Points
24	Dec 2	Montreal Canadiens	3–3	Pittsburgh Penguins	Civic Arena (8,601)	5–10–9	19
25	Dec 5	Vancouver Canucks	1–3	Pittsburgh Penguins	Civic Arena (8,111)	6–10–9	21
26	Dec 6	Pittsburgh Penguins	3–6	Boston Bruins	Boston Garden (14,994)	6–11–9	21
27	Dec 8	Toronto Maple Leafs	0–4	Pittsburgh Penguins	Civic Arena (7,034)	7–11–9	23
28	Dec 9	Pittsburgh Penguins	2–2	Minnesota North Stars	Met Center (12,222)	7–11–10	24
29	Dec 11	Pittsburgh Penguins	2–3	St. Louis Blues	St. Louis Arena (17,764)	7–12–10	24
30	Dec 12	Minnesota North Stars	1–0	Pittsburgh Penguins	Civic Arena (9,031)	7–13–10	24
31	Dec 16	Toronto Maple Leafs	4–2	Pittsburgh Penguins	Civic Arena (7,222)	7–14–10	24
32	Dec 19	Detroit Red Wings	1–9	Pittsburgh Penguins	Civic Arena (8,011)	8–14–10	26
33	Dec 20	Pittsburgh Penguins	1–2	Chicago Black Hawks	Chicago Stadium (-)	8–15–10	26
34	Dec 23	Pittsburgh Penguins	1–6	New York Rangers	Madison Square Garden (IV) (17,250)	8–16–10	26
35	Dec 25	Pittsburgh Penguins	4–8	Boston Bruins	Boston Garden (14,994)	8–17–10	26
36	Dec 26	Boston Bruins	2–4	Pittsburgh Penguins	Civic Arena (13,050)	9–17–10	28
37	Dec 30	Pittsburgh Penguins	3–3	Montreal Canadiens	Montreal Forum (16,753)	9–17–11	29
38	Dec 31	Minnesota North Stars	1–4	Pittsburgh Penguins	Civic Arena (10,337)	10–17–11	31

January: 6–5–1 (home: 4–1–0; road: 2–4–1), 13 points

#	Date	Visitor	Score	Home	Location (Attendance)	Record	Points
39	Jan 2	New York Rangers	3–1	Pittsburgh Penguins	Civic Arena (12,444)	10–18–11	31
40	Jan 6	Pittsburgh Penguins	3–4	Philadelphia Flyers	The Spectrum (12,127)	10–19–11	31
41	Jan 9	Pittsburgh Penguins	2–5	Toronto Maple Leafs	Maple Leaf Gardens (16,485)	10–20–11	31
42	Jan 13	Los Angeles Kings	2–4	Pittsburgh Penguins	Civic Arena (7,575)	11–20–11	33
43	Jan 14	Pittsburgh Penguins	2–2	Detroit Red Wings	Olympia Stadium (11,360)	11–20–12	34
44	Jan 16	Pittsburgh Penguins	4–3	Vancouver Canucks	Pacific Coliseum (14,098)	12–20–12	36
45	Jan 20	Pittsburgh Penguins	4–2	California Golden Seals	Oakland Coliseum Arena (3,293)	13–20–12	38
46	Jan 21	Pittsburgh Penguins	2–4	Los Angeles Kings	The Forum (7,587)	13–21–12	38
47	Jan 23	Vancouver Canucks	1–4	Pittsburgh Penguins	Civic Arena (12,304)	14–21–12	40
48	Jan 27	Toronto Maple Leafs	1–3	Pittsburgh Penguins	Civic Arena (9,039)	15–21–12	42
49	Jan 28	Pittsburgh Penguins	1–4	Chicago Black Hawks	Chicago Stadium (-)	15–22–12	42
50	Jan 30	Chicago Black Hawks	1–3	Pittsburgh Penguins	Civic Arena (12,528)	16–22–12	44

February: 3–7–3 (home: 3–2–1; road: 0–5–2), 9 points

#	Date	Visitor	Score	Home	Location (Attendance)	Record	Points
51	Feb 3	California Golden Seals	1–6	Pittsburgh Penguins	Civic Arena (10,208)	17–22–12	46
52	Feb 5	Pittsburgh Penguins	2–2	St. Louis Blues	St. Louis Arena (18,206)	17–22–13	47
53	Feb 7	Pittsburgh Penguins	0–1	Chicago Black Hawks	Chicago Stadium (-)	17–23–13	47
54	Feb 9	Pittsburgh Penguins	1–4	Montreal Canadiens	Montreal Forum (16,211)	17–24–13	47
55	Feb 10	Philadelphia Flyers	3–5	Pittsburgh Penguins	Civic Arena (10,311)	18–24–13	49
56	Feb 13	Chicago Black Hawks	4–5	Pittsburgh Penguins	Civic Arena (10,755)	19–24–13	51
57	Feb 14	Pittsburgh Penguins	4–5	Minnesota North Stars	Met Center (15,042)	19–25–13	51
58	Feb 17	Pittsburgh Penguins	3–4	Toronto Maple Leafs	Maple Leaf Gardens (16,413)	19–26–13	51
59	Feb 18	Pittsburgh Penguins	6–6	Buffalo Sabres	Buffalo Memorial Auditorium (9,969)	19–26–14	52
60	Feb 20	New York Rangers	2–0	Pittsburgh Penguins	Civic Arena (13,200)	19–27–14	52
61	Feb 24	St. Louis Blues	5–5	Pittsburgh Penguins	Civic Arena (10,005)	19–27–15	53
62	Feb 27	New York Rangers	4–0	Pittsburgh Penguins	Civic Arena (12,419)	19–28–15	53
63	Feb 28	Pittsburgh Penguins	2–4	Detroit Red Wings	Olympia Stadium (12,683)	19–29–15	53

March: 2–7–3 (home: 2–3–3; road: 0–4–0), 7 points

#	Date	Visitor	Score	Home	Location (Attendance)	Record	Points
64	Mar 3	Montreal Canadiens	0–4	Pittsburgh Penguins	Civic Arena (8,011)	20–29–15	55
65	Mar 6	Boston Bruins	6–3	Pittsburgh Penguins	Civic Arena (13,020)	20–30–15	55
66	Mar 7	California Golden Seals	3–3	Pittsburgh Penguins	Civic Arena (11,283)	20–30–16	56
67	Mar 10	Philadelphia Flyers	2–2	Pittsburgh Penguins	Civic Arena (8,590)	20–30–17	57
68	Mar 13	Minnesota North Stars	0–0	Pittsburgh Penguins	Civic Arena (10,284)	20–30–18	58
69	Mar 14	Montreal Canadiens	5–1	Pittsburgh Penguins	Civic Arena (8,741)	20–31–18	58
70	Mar 17	Pittsburgh Penguins	2–5	California Golden Seals	Oakland Coliseum Arena (2,647)	20–32–18	58
71	Mar 19	Pittsburgh Penguins	4–6	Vancouver Canucks	Pacific Coliseum (15,570)	20–33–18	58
72	Mar 20	Pittsburgh Penguins	4–8	Los Angeles Kings	The Forum (7,771)	20–34–18	58
73	Mar 24	Detroit Red Wings	2–8	Pittsburgh Penguins	Civic Arena (9,025)	21–34–18	60
74	Mar 28	Pittsburgh Penguins	1–3	Philadelphia Flyers	The Spectrum (14,620)	21–35–18	60
75	Mar 31	Buffalo Sabres	6–4	Pittsburgh Penguins	Civic Arena (7,051)	21–36–18	60

April: 0–1–2 (home: 0–0–1; road: 0–1–1), 2 points

#	Date	Visitor	Score	Home	Location (Attendance)	Record	Points
76	Apr 1	Pittsburgh Penguins	3–3	Buffalo Sabres	Buffalo Memorial Auditorium (10,429)	21–36–19	61
77	Apr 3	Pittsburgh Penguins	3–4	St. Louis Blues	St. Louis Arena (18,529)	21–37–19	61
78	Apr 4	St. Louis Blues	1–1	Pittsburgh Penguins	Civic Arena (10,117)	21–37–20	62

Legend: Win (2 points) Loss (0 points) Tie (1 point)

== Player statistics ==
Skaters

Regular season
Player	GP	G	A	Pts	+/−	PIM
Bryan Hextall Jr.	76	16	32	48	–23	133
Jean Pronovost	78	21	24	45	8	35
Andy Bathgate	76	15	29	44	–11	34
Wally Boyer	68	11	30	41	10	30
Ron Schock	71	14	26	40	2	20
Dean Prentice	69	21	17	38	–8	18
Ken Schinkel	50	15	19	34	–19	6
Greg Polis	61	18	15	33	–6	40
Duane Rupp	59	5	28	33	–10	34
Keith McCreary	59	21	12	33	7	24
Dunc McCallum	77	9	20	29	–13	95
Bob Woytowich	78	4	22	26	8	30
Nick Harbaruk	78	13	12	25	–9	108
Syl Apps Jr.^{†}	31	9	16	25	3	21
Val Fonteyne	70	4	9	13	–8	0
Rod Zaine	37	8	5	13	–8	21
Glen Sather^{‡}	46	8	3	11	0	96
Jim Morrison	73	0	10	10	–12	32
Bob Blackburn	64	4	5	9	0	54
Bryan Watson	43	2	6	8	–5	119
John Stewart	15	2	1	3	–9	9
Robin Burns	10	0	3	3	1	4
Rick Kessell	6	0	2	2	1	2
Sheldon Kannegiesser	18	0	2	2	–9	29
Yvon Labre	21	1	1	2	2	19
Lowell MacDonald	10	0	1	1	–6	0
Steve Cardwell	5	0	1	1	–4	15
Total		221	351	572	—	1,028

Goaltenders

Regular Season
Player	GP	W	L	T	GA	SO
Les Binkley	34	11	11	10	89	2
Allan Smith	46	9	22	9	128	2
Cam Newton	5	1	3	1	16	0
Paul Hoganson	2	0	1	0	7	0
Total		21	37	20	240	4

^{†}Denotes player spent time with another team before joining the Penguins. Stats reflect time with the Penguins only.
^{‡}Denotes player was traded mid-season. Stats reflect time with the Penguins only.

== Awards and records ==
- Ken Schinkel became the first player to record 100 assists with the Penguins. He did so in a 2–5 loss to California on March 17.
- Wally Boyer became the first player in franchise history to have a final plus-minus of at least +10.
- Dunc McCallum tied the team record for goals in a season by a defenseman with 9.

== Transactions ==
The Penguins were involved in the following transactions during the 1970–71 season:

=== Trades ===
October 2, 1970	To Montreal Canadiens cash	To Pittsburgh Penguins Robin Burns
October 9, 1970	To Buffalo Sabres Dave Dryden	To Pittsburgh Penguins cash
January 24, 1971	To Buffalo Sabres Terry Ball	To Pittsburgh Penguins Jean-Guy Lagace
January 26, 1971	To New York Rangers Glen Sather	To Pittsburgh Penguins Syl Apps Jr. Sheldon Kannegiesser
May 1, 1971	To Boston Bruins cash	To Pittsburgh Penguins Bob Leiter

=== Other ===
Player	Date	Details
Roy Edwards	June 7, 1971	Claimed off of waivers from Detroit Red Wings
Rod Zaine	June 8, 1971	Lost in intra-league draft to Buffalo Sabres
Al Smith	June 8, 1971	#2 overall pick in intra-league draft to Detroit Red Wings
Jim Rutherford	June 8, 1971	#3 overall pick in intra-league draft from Detroit Red Wings
Dave Burrows	June 8, 1971	#5 overall pick in intra-league draft from Chicago Blackhawks
Rene Robert	June 8, 1971	#22 overall pick in intra-league draft from Toronto Maple Leafs
Tim Horton	June 8, 1971	Claimed in intra-league draft from New York Rangers

== Draft picks ==
Pittsburgh Penguins' picks at the 1970 NHL entry draft.

Round	#	Player	Pos	Nationality	College/Junior/Club team (League)
1	7	Greg Polis	Left wing	Canada	Estevan Bruins (WCHL)
2	21	John Stewart	Left wing	Canada	Flin Flon Bombers (WCHL)
3	35	Larry Bignell	Defenseman	Canada	Edmonton Oil Kings (WCHL)
4	49	Connie Forey	Left wing	Canada	Ottawa 67's (OHA)
5	63	Steve Cardwell	Left wing	Canada	Oshawa Generals (OHA)
6	77	Bob Fitchner	Center	Canada	Brandon Wheat Kings (WCHL)
7	90	Jim Pearson	Defenseman	Canada	St. Catharines Black Hawks (OHA)
8	102	Cam Newton	Goaltender	Canada	Kitchener Rangers (OHA)
9	110	Ron Lemieux	Defenseman	Canada	Dauphin Kings (MJHL)
