= Hap Myers (ice hockey) =

Canadian ice hockey player

- Born: July 28, 1947 (age 77); Edmonton, Alberta, Canada
- Height: 5 ft 11 in (180 cm)
- Weight: 195 lb (88 kg; 13 st 13 lb)
- Position: Defence
- Shot: Left
- Played for: Buffalo Sabres
- Playing career: 1968–1974

Harold Robert "Hap" Myers (born July 28, 1947) is a Canadian restaurateur and former professional ice hockey defenceman.

== Career ==
Myers played thirteen games in the National Hockey League with the Buffalo Sabres in the 1970–71 season, the team's first in the league. He was scoreless and recorded six penalty minutes. The rest of his career, which lasted from 1968 to 1974, was spent in the minor leagues. Myers owns a restaurant called Hap's Hungry House in Edmonton.

== Career statistics ==
=== Regular season and playoffs ===
			Regular season					Playoffs
Season	Team	League	GP	G	A	Pts	PIM	GP	G	A	Pts	PIM
1964–65	Edmonton Red Wings	AJHL-B	—	—	—	—	—	—	—	—	—	—
1964–65	Edmonton Oil Kings	ASHL	—	—	—	—	—	—	—	—	—	—
1964–65	Edmonton Oil Kings	M-Cup	—	—	—	—	—	21	0	3	3	17
1965–66	Edmonton Oil Kings	ASHL	40	0	3	3	18	11	3	3	6	14
1965–66	Edmonton Oil Kings	M-Cup	—	—	—	—	—	11	0	0	0	10
1966–67	Edmonton Oil Kings	CMJHL	56	6	33	39	86	9	0	7	7	30
1967–68	Edmonton Oil Kings	WCHL	55	13	37	50	98	13	3	5	8	26
1968–69	Fort Worth Wings	CHL	70	8	13	21	52	—	—	—	—	—
1969–70	Cleveland Barons	AHL	72	9	28	37	61	—	—	—	—	—
1970–71	Buffalo Sabres	NHL	13	0	0	0	6	—	—	—	—	—
1970–71	Salt Lake Golden Eagles	WHL	43	1	4	5	14	—	—	—	—	—
1971–72	Cincinnati Swords	AHL	67	4	16	20	55	10	0	3	3	14
1972–73	Cincinnati Swords	AHL	37	0	9	9	2	15	0	4	4	12
1973–74	Cincinnati Swords	AHL	76	6	25	31	51	5	0	2	2	8
AHL totals			252	19	78	97	169	30	0	9	9	34
NHL totals			13	0	0	0	6	—	—	—	—	—
