= Bob Cook (ice hockey) =

Canadian ice hockey player

- Born: January 6, 1946; Sudbury, Ontario, Canada
- Died: March 29, 1978 (aged 32); London, Ontario, Canada
- Height: 6 ft 0 in (183 cm)
- Weight: 190 lb (86 kg; 13 st 8 lb)
- Position: Right wing
- Shot: Right
- Played for: Vancouver Canucks; Detroit Red Wings; New York Islanders; Minnesota North Stars
- Playing career: 1966–1975

Robert Arthur Cook (January 6, 1946 – March 29, 1978) was a Canadian ice hockey player. Cook played professional ice hockey from 1966 to 1975, including 72 games in the National Hockey League (NHL) with four teams. Cook finished his career with the New Haven Nighthawks of the American Hockey League (AHL) during the 1974–75 season.

== Playing career ==
Cook began in junior hockey with the London Nationals of the Ontario Hockey League (OHL) in 1963. He was looked at as a role player that could finish chances when they were given. He continued to develop with the Nationals until midway through his 1965–66 season, when he was traded to the Kitchener Rangers. In only 31 games, Cook put up 72 penalty minutes to go with his 17 points. He also threw in 14 points and 51 penalty minutes in the Rangers 19-game playoff run in which they lost to the Oshawa Generals, featuring a young Bobby Orr.

In 1966, Cook turned professional with the Vancouver Canucks, then of the Western Hockey League (WHL). Cook appeared in 55 games for the Canucks, registering 7 goals and 14 points, but was ultimately moved to the Rochester Americans for the 1967–68 season. Playing for the Americans, Cook put up the highest point totals of his career. Excluding a brief stint with the Tulsa Oilers of the Central Hockey League (CHL), Cook played almost four full seasons with Rochester. He netted 133 points during that span including 44 during the 1969–70 season. However the 1970–71 season would finally see Cook reaching his goal.

In 1970, the Vancouver Canucks, who owned the Rochester Americans, were granted an NHL expansion franchise and Cook's rights were transferred to Vancouver. Cook played two games for the Vancouver Canucks, now of the NHL, before the end of the season. After allowing Cook a short reconditioning stint with the Seattle Totems of the WHL, his rights were traded to the Detroit Red Wings for cash on November 21, 1971.

Cook again found himself in a team's farm system and he tried to prove himself playing for the Fort Worth Wings of the CHL and the Tidewater Wings of the AHL. After a season in the minors, Cook again got to play in the NHL, when he joined the Red Wings during the 1972–73 season. He played 13 games and put up four points before being traded along with Ralph Stewart for Ken Murray and Brian Lavender to the New York Islanders on January 17, 1973.

Cook had his longest stay in the NHL with New York, playing in 55 games throughout the 1972–73 and 1973–74 seasons. His time with the Islanders is notable for his hat trick in a game against his former team, the Vancouver Canucks, on March 3, 1973, when he became the second player in franchise history to record a hat trick as a rookie, a feat duplicated only nine more times in the first 50 years of the franchise. However, Cook netted only 17 points in his season with the Islander and was sent down to Baltimore Clippers of the AHL for the remainder of the season. He again found his form, scoring 19 goals and 19 assists and helping the Clippers into the playoffs. He scored 10 points in the playoffs but the Clippers lost to the eventual champions, the Hershey Bears. For the 1974–75 season, Cook began play with the Fort Worth Texans of the CHL but ended the season with the New Haven Nighthawks of the AHL. The Nighthawks were a minor league team for the Minnesota North Stars of the NHL and Cook was called up to play his last two NHL games with them midway through the season. Those games would be his last and Cook retired at the end of 1975 after helping yet another team reach the finals, but the Nighthawks would fall to the Springfield Indians in five games.

From 1975 to 1976, in the ending slope of his career, Cook played for the London Kings in the Colorado Springs Adult Hockey League (CSAHL).

== Post-hockey life ==
After retiring from hockey, Cook returned to London, Ontario, where he died on March 29, 1978, at 32 years of age. He is buried in Cowal-McBrides Cemetery in Elgin County, Ontario.

== Career statistics ==
=== Regular season and playoffs ===
| | | | Regular season | | | | | Playoffs |
| Season | Team | League | GP | G | A | Pts | PIM | GP | G | A | Pts | PIM |
|---|---|---|---|---|---|---|---|---|---|---|---|---|
| 1965–66 | London Nationals | WOHL | 14 | 2 | 10 | 12 | 14 | — | — | — | — | — |
| 1965–66 | Kitchener Rangers | OHA | 31 | 10 | 7 | 17 | 72 | 19 | 9 | 5 | 14 | 51 |
| 1966–67 | Vancouver Canucks | WHL | 55 | 7 | 7 | 14 | 31 | 5 | 0 | 0 | 0 | 11 |
| 1967–68 | Vancouver Canucks | WHL | 1 | 0 | 0 | 0 | 0 | — | — | — | — | — |
| 1967–68 | Rochester Americans | AHL | 61 | 22 | 16 | 38 | 95 | 1 | 0 | 0 | 0 | 0 |
| 1968–69 | Rochester Americans | AHL | 59 | 4 | 6 | 10 | 24 | — | — | — | — | — |
| 1968–69 | Tulsa Oilers | CHL | 12 | 6 | 7 | 13 | 14 | 6 | 0 | 2 | 2 | 8 |
| 1969–70 | Rochester Americans | AHL | 71 | 26 | 18 | 44 | 78 | — | — | — | — | — |
| 1970–71 | Vancouver Canucks | NHL | 2 | 0 | 0 | 0 | 0 | — | — | — | — | — |
| 1970–71 | Rochester Americans | AHL | 68 | 22 | 19 | 41 | 66 | — | — | — | — | — |
| 1971–72 | Fort Worth Wings | CHL | 15 | 4 | 4 | 8 | 24 | — | — | — | — | — |
| 1971–72 | Seattle Totems | WHL | 15 | 3 | 3 | 6 | 27 | — | — | — | — | — |
| 1971–72 | Tidewater Wings | AHL | 35 | 9 | 8 | 17 | 40 | — | — | — | — | — |
| 1972–73 | Detroit Red Wings | NHL | 13 | 3 | 1 | 4 | 4 | — | — | — | — | — |
| 1972–73 | Virginia Wings | AHL | 23 | 17 | 9 | 26 | 70 | — | — | — | — | — |
| 1972–73 | New York Islanders | NHL | 33 | 8 | 6 | 14 | 14 | — | — | — | — | — |
| 1973–74 | New York Islanders | NHL | 22 | 2 | 1 | 3 | 4 | — | — | — | — | — |
| 1973–74 | Baltimore Clippers | AHL | 52 | 19 | 19 | 38 | 35 | 9 | 5 | 5 | 10 | 10 |
| 1974–75 | Fort Worth Texans | CHL | 22 | 3 | 6 | 9 | 37 | — | — | — | — | — |
| 1974–75 | Minnesota North Stars | NHL | 2 | 0 | 1 | 1 | 0 | — | — | — | — | — |
| 1974–75 | New Haven Nighthawks | AHL | 50 | 15 | 26 | 41 | 43 | 16 | 7 | 5 | 12 | 14 |
| AHL totals | | | 419 | 134 | 121 | 255 | 451 | 26 | 12 | 10 | 22 | 24 |
| NHL totals | | | 72 | 13 | 9 | 22 | 22 | — | — | — | — | — |
