= Jim Mair (ice hockey) =

Canadian ice hockey player

- Born: May 15, 1946 (age 79) Schumacher, Ontario, Canada
- Height: 5 ft 9 in (175 cm)
- Weight: 198 lb (90 kg; 14 st 2 lb)
- Position: Defence
- Shot: Right
- Played for: Philadelphia Flyers; New York Islanders; Vancouver Canucks
- Playing career: 1966–1975

James McKay Mair (born May 15, 1946) is a Canadian former professional ice hockey player. He played 76 games in the NHL for the Philadelphia Flyers, New York Islanders, and Vancouver Canucks, and several seasons in the minor Eastern Hockey League and American Hockey League during a career that lasted from 1966 to 1975.

== Career statistics ==
=== Regular season and playoffs ===
			Regular season					Playoffs
Season	Team	League	GP	G	A	Pts	PIM	GP	G	A	Pts	PIM
1963–64	Hamilton Red Wings	OHA	4	2	1	3	2	—	—	—	—	—
1964–65	Hamilton Red Wings	OHA	39	7	14	21	76	—	—	—	—	—
1965–66	Saint-Jérôme Alouettes	QJAHL	47	11	26	37	145	5	1	0	1	6
1966–67	Johnstown Jets	EHL	62	10	25	35	247	5	2	3	5	-
1967–68	Johnstown Jets	EHL	71	20	45	65	247	3	0	0	0	8
1968–69	Johnstown Jets	EHL	61	27	31	58	158	3	0	2	2	0
1969–70	Quebec Aces	AHL	47	5	7	12	58	6	2	0	2	12
1970–71	Philadelphia Flyers	NHL	2	0	0	0	0	3	1	2	3	4
1970–71	Quebec Aces	AHL	62	11	16	27	52	1	0	0	0	4
1971–72	Richmond Robins	AHL	69	10	25	35	75	—	—	—	—	—
1971–72	Philadelphia Flyers	NHL	2	0	0	0	0	—	—	—	—	—
1972–73	New York Islanders	NHL	49	2	11	13	41	—	—	—	—	—
1972–73	Vancouver Canucks	NHL	15	1	0	1	8	—	—	—	—	—
1973–74	Vancouver Canucks	NHL	6	1	3	4	0	—	—	—	—	—
1973–74	Seattle Totems	WHL	65	8	30	38	115	—	—	—	—	—
1974–75	Vancouver Canucks	NHL	2	0	1	1	0	—	—	—	—	—
1974–75	Seattle Totems	CHL	63	12	17	29	96	—	—	—	—	—
NHL totals			76	4	15	19	49	—	—	—	—	—
