= 1970–71 Montreal Canadiens season =

NHL hockey team season (won 17th Stanley Cup)

1970–71 Montreal Canadiens
- Stanley Cup champions
- Division: 3rd East
- 1970–71 record: 42–23–13
- Home record: 29–7–3
- Road record: 13–16–10
- Goals for: 291
- Goals against: 216

Team information
- General manager: Sam Pollock
- Coach: Claude Ruel (Oct–Dec); Al MacNeil (Dec–May)
- Captain: Jean Beliveau
- Alternate captains: John Ferguson; Henri Richard
- Arena: Montreal Forum

Team leaders
- Goals: Yvan Cournoyer (37)
- Assists: Jean Beliveau (51)
- Points: Jean Beliveau (76)
- Penalty minutes: Pete Mahovlich (181)
- Wins: Rogie Vachon (23)
- Goals against average: Rogie Vachon (2.64)

The 1970–71 Montreal Canadiens season was the club's 62nd season. After missing the playoffs in the previous season, the team rebounded to place third in the East Division, qualifying for the playoffs. Behind new star goalie Ken Dryden the team won their 17th Stanley Cup championship.

== Regular season ==
With the Chicago Black Hawks having moved to the West Division to make way for the expansion Vancouver Canucks and Buffalo Sabres, qualification for the four available playoff berths in the East was widely expected to be contested between the five remaining Original Six teams. Considering such factors the addition of two new teams, the expansion of the schedule to 78 games and the switch to a balanced schedule, Montreal's record of 42–23–13 (five points more than their performance over 76 games the previous season) was at best a marginal improvement. However, a return to the postseason was never in serious doubt due to the stunning regression of the Detroit Red Wings (Detroit actually finished last place in the division, behind both expansion teams).

On February 11, 1971, Jean Beliveau became the fourth player to score 500 career goals.

=== Final standings ===
East Division
		GP	W	L	T	GF	GA	DIFF	Pts
1	Boston Bruins	78	57	14	7	399	207	+192	121
2	New York Rangers	78	49	18	11	259	177	+82	109
3	Montreal Canadiens	78	42	23	13	291	216	+75	97
4	Toronto Maple Leafs	78	37	33	8	248	211	+37	82
5	Buffalo Sabres	78	24	39	15	217	291	−74	63
6	Vancouver Canucks	78	24	46	8	229	296	−67	56
7	Detroit Red Wings	78	22	45	11	209	308	−99	55

=== Record vs. opponents ===
==== Vs. East Division ====
1970–71 NHL records
Team	BOS	BUF	DET	MTL	NYR	TOR	VAN	Total
Boston	—	4–1–1	5–1	5–1	2–2–2	5–1	5–1	26–7–3
Buffalo	1–4–1	—	3–3	0–3–3	0–4–2	1–5	3–3	8–22–6
Detroit	1–5	3–3	—	1–4–1	1–4–1	1–4–1	4–2	11–22–3
Montreal	1–5	3–0–3	4–1–1	—	3–3	2–4	4–0–2	17–13–6
New York	2–2–2	4–0–2	4–1–1	3–3	—	5–1	5–1	23–8–5
Toronto	1–5	5–1	4–1–1	4–2	1–5	—	3–3	18–17–1
Vancouver	1–5	3–3	2–4	0–4–2	1–5	3–3	—	10–24–2

==== Vs. West Division ====
1970–71 NHL records
Team	CAL	CHI	LAK	MIN	PHI	PIT	STL	Total
Boston	5–1	2–3–1	5–1	5–0–1	6–0	4–1–1	4–1–1	31–7–4
Buffalo	3–3	0–5–1	2–1–3	5–1	2–3–1	2–0–4	2–4	16–17–9
Detroit	4–2	0–6	1–2–3	2–3–1	3–2–1	1–3–2	0–5–1	11–23–8
Montreal	5–1	3–3	4–2	3–1–2	4–1–1	3–1–2	3–1–2	25–10–7
New York	3–2–1	3–3	4–0–2	6–0	2–3–1	5–0–1	3–2–1	26–6–10
Toronto	3–2–1	3–2–1	3–3	2–2–2	2–3–1	3–2–1	3–2–1	19–16–7
Vancouver	5–1	0–5–1	3–2–1	2–3–1	2–4	1–4–1	1–3–2	14–22–6

== Playoffs ==
=== Stanley Cup Final ===
Brothers Frank and Peter Mahovlich starred for the Canadiens, scoring nine goals in the seven game final series. Ken Dryden debuted for the Canadiens, while this was Jean Beliveau's final final series appearance, and he ended his career with ten championships.

== Schedule and results ==
1970–71 regular season
October

Game	Result	Date	Score	Opponent	Record
1	W	October 11, 1970	2–1	@ Philadelphia Flyers (1970–71)	1–0–0
2	W	October 13, 1970	4–3	Detroit Red Wings (1970–71)	2–0–0
3	W	October 15, 1970	3–0	@ Buffalo Sabres (1970–71)	3–0–0
4	W	October 17, 1970	6–2	Chicago Black Hawks (1970–71)	4–0–0
5	L	October 18, 1970	0–1	@ New York Rangers (1970–71)	4–1–0
6	L	October 21, 1970	1–3	Minnesota North Stars (1970–71)	4–2–0
7	W	October 24, 1970	3–1	Philadelphia Flyers (1970–71)	5–2–0
8	T	October 25, 1970	3–3	@ Detroit Red Wings (1970–71)	5–2–1
9	L	October 28, 1970	2–6	@ Toronto Maple Leafs (1970–71)	5–3–1
10	W	October 31, 1970	6–3	Vancouver Canucks (1970–71)	6–3–1

November

Game	Result	Date	Score	Opponent	Record
11	W	November 4, 1970	4–3	@ Minnesota North Stars (1970–71)	7–3–1
12	W	November 7, 1970	11–2	Buffalo Sabres (1970–71)	8–3–1
13	L	November 8, 1970	1–6	@ Boston Bruins (1970–71)	8–4–1
14	L	November 11, 1970	0–2	@ California Golden Seals (1970–71)	8–5–1
15	T	November 14, 1970	1–1	@ St. Louis Blues (1970–71)	8–5–2
16	T	November 15, 1970	2–2	@ Buffalo Sabres (1970–71)	8–5–3
17	W	November 17, 1970	5–1	California Golden Seals (1970–71)	9–5–3
18	W	November 19, 1970	5–1	Toronto Maple Leafs (1970–71)	10–5–3
19	L	November 21, 1970	4–5	New York Rangers (1970–71)	10–6–3
20	L	November 25, 1970	3–5	@ Chicago Black Hawks (1970–71)	10–7–3
21	W	November 28, 1970	5–1	Pittsburgh Penguins (1970–71)	11–7–3
22	L	November 29, 1970	3–5	@ Detroit Red Wings (1970–71)	11–8–3

December

Game	Result	Date	Score	Opponent	Record
23	T	December 2, 1970	3–3	@ Pittsburgh Penguins (1970–71)	11–8–4
24	W	December 3, 1970	6–3	St. Louis Blues (1970–71)	12–8–4
25	L	December 5, 1970	2–4	Boston Bruins (1970–71)	12–9–4
26	L	December 9, 1970	0–4	@ Toronto Maple Leafs (1970–71)	12–10–4
27	W	December 10, 1970	6–1	Minnesota North Stars (1970–71)	13–10–4
28	W	December 12, 1970	8–1	Los Angeles Kings (1970–71)	14–10–4
29	T	December 16, 1970	1–1	@ Minnesota North Stars (1970–71)	14–10–5
30	W	December 18, 1970	4–3	@ Vancouver Canucks (1970–71)	15–10–5
31	L	December 20, 1970	2–7	@ Los Angeles Kings (1970–71)	15–11–5
32	T	December 23, 1970	2–2	@ St. Louis Blues (1970–71)	15–11–6
33	T	December 26, 1970	4–4	Buffalo Sabres (1970–71)	15–11–7
34	W	December 27, 1970	4–2	@ Philadelphia Flyers (1970–71)	16–11–7
35	T	December 30, 1970	3–3	Pittsburgh Penguins (1970–71)	16–11–8

January

Game	Result	Date	Score	Opponent	Record
36	W	January 2, 1971	5–3	California Golden Seals (1970–71)	17–11–8
37	L	January 3, 1971	5–6	@ New York Rangers (1970–71)	17–12–8
38	W	January 6, 1971	7–3	Vancouver Canucks (1970–71)	18–12–8
39	W	January 9, 1971	1–0	Los Angeles Kings (1970–71)	19–12–8
40	L	January 10, 1971	2–3	Philadelphia Flyers (1970–71)	19–13–8
41	T	January 14, 1971	3–3	@ Minnesota North Stars (1970–71)	19–13–9
42	W	January 16, 1971	4–2	Boston Bruins (1970–71)	20–13–9
43	T	January 17, 1971	4–4	@ Buffalo Sabres (1970–71)	20–13–10
44	T	January 21, 1971	5–5	@ Philadelphia Flyers (1970–71)	20–13–11
45	W	January 23, 1971	6–2	Detroit Red Wings (1970–71)	21–13–11
46	L	January 24, 1971	2–4	@ Boston Bruins (1970–71)	21–14–11
47	W	January 27, 1971	4–2	St. Louis Blues (1970–71)	22–14–11
48	L	January 30, 1971	4–5	Toronto Maple Leafs (1970–71)	22–15–11
49	L	January 31, 1971	1–4	@ Chicago Black Hawks (1970–71)	22–16–11

February

Game	Result	Date	Score	Opponent	Record
50	W	February 2, 1971	5–2	@ Vancouver Canucks (1970–71)	23–16–11
51	W	February 5, 1971	3–2	@ California Golden Seals (1970–71)	24–16–11
52	L	February 6, 1971	3–6	@ Los Angeles Kings (1970–71)	24–17–11
53	W	February 9, 1971	4–1	Pittsburgh Penguins (1970–71)	25–17–11
54	W	February 11, 1971	6–2	Minnesota North Stars (1970–71)	26–17–11
55	W	February 13, 1971	5–2	California Golden Seals (1970–71)	27–17–11
56	W	February 17, 1971	3–0	New York Rangers (1970–71)	28–17–11
57	W	February 20, 1971	7–1	Chicago Black Hawks (1970–71)	29–17–11
58	T	February 22, 1971	3–3	@ Vancouver Canucks (1970–71)	29–17–12
59	W	February 24, 1971	5–2	@ California Golden Seals (1970–71)	30–17–12
60	W	February 25, 1971	5–3	@ Los Angeles Kings (1970–71)	31–17–12
61	W	February 27, 1971	3–2	St. Louis Blues (1970–71)	32–17–12

March

Game	Result	Date	Score	Opponent	Record
62	L	March 3, 1971	0–4	@ Pittsburgh Penguins (1970–71)	32–18–12
63	W	March 6, 1971	8–2	Los Angeles Kings (1970–71)	33–18–12
64	W	March 7, 1971	4–1	@ Detroit Red Wings (1970–71)	34–18–12
65	T	March 9, 1971	3–3	Vancouver Canucks (1970–71)	34–18–13
66	L	March 10, 1971	1–2	@ Toronto Maple Leafs (1970–71)	34–19–13
67	L	March 13, 1971	1–4	Chicago Black Hawks (1970–71)	34–20–13
68	W	March 14, 1971	5–1	@ Pittsburgh Penguins (1970–71)	35–20–13
69	L	March 16, 1971	2–6	@ St. Louis Blues (1970–71)	35–21–13
70	W	March 18, 1971	4–1	Toronto Maple Leafs (1970–71)	36–21–13
71	W	March 20, 1971	5–2	Buffalo Sabres (1970–71)	37–21–13
72	W	March 21, 1971	6–2	@ New York Rangers (1970–71)	38–21–13
73	W	March 24, 1971	5–3	Philadelphia Flyers (1970–71)	39–21–13
74	W	March 27, 1971	9–2	Detroit Red Wings (1970–71)	40–21–13
75	W	March 28, 1971	2–1	@ Chicago Black Hawks (1970–71)	41–21–13
76	L	March 31, 1971	3–6	Boston Bruins (1970–71)	41–22–13

April

Game	Result	Date	Score	Opponent	Record
77	W	April 3, 1971	7–2	New York Rangers (1970–71)	42–22–13
78	L	April 4, 1971	2–7	@ Boston Bruins (1970–71)	42–23–13

Legend: Win (2 points) Loss (0 points) Tie (1 point)

=== Playoffs ===
1971 Stanley Cup playoffs
Quarterfinals vs. (E1) Boston Bruins – Canadiens win 4–3

Game	Result	Date	Score	Opponent	Series
1	L	April 7, 1971	1–3	@ Boston Bruins	0–1
2	W	April 8, 1971	7–5	@ Boston Bruins	1–1
3	W	April 10, 1971	3–1	Boston Bruins	2–1
4	L	April 11, 1971	2–5	Boston Bruins	2–2
5	L	April 13, 1971	3–7	@ Boston Bruins	2–3
6	W	April 15, 1971	8–3	Boston Bruins	3–3
7	W	April 18, 1971	4–2	@ Boston Bruins	4–3

Semifinals vs. (W4) Minnesota North Stars – Canadiens win 4–2

Game	Result	Date	Score	Opponent	Series
1	W	April 20, 1971	7–2	Minnesota North Stars	1–0
2	L	April 22, 1971	3–6	Minnesota North Stars	1–1
3	W	April 24, 1971	6–3	@ Minnesota North Stars	2–1
4	L	April 25, 1971	2–5	@ Minnesota North Stars	2–2
5	W	April 27, 1971	6–1	Minnesota North Stars	3–2
6	W	April 29, 1971	3–2	@ Minnesota North Stars	4–2

Stanley Cup Final vs. (W1) Chicago Black Hawks – Canadiens win 4–3

Game	Result	Date	Score	Opponent	Series
1	L	May 4, 1971	1–2 (OT)	@ Chicago Black Hawks	0–1
2	L	May 6, 1971	3–5	@ Chicago Black Hawks	0–2
3	W	May 9, 1971	4–2	Chicago Black Hawks	1–2
4	W	May 11, 1971	5–2	Chicago Black Hawks	2–2
5	L	May 13, 1971	0–2	@ Chicago Black Hawks	2–3
6	W	May 16, 1971	4–3	Chicago Black Hawks	3–3
7	W	May 18, 1971	3–2	@ Chicago Black Hawks	4–3

Legend: Win Loss

== Player statistics ==
=== Regular season ===
==== Scoring ====
Player	Pos	GP	G	A	Pts	PIM	+/-	PPG	SHG	GWG
Jean Beliveau	C	70	25	51	76	40	24	7	0	4
Yvan Cournoyer	RW	65	37	36	73	21	20	18	0	5
J. C. Tremblay	D	76	11	52	63	23	16	5	0	4
Pete Mahovlich	C	78	35	26	61	181	25	12	3	5
Jacques Lemaire	C	78	28	28	56	18	0	6	0	3
Marc Tardif	LW	76	19	30	49	133	25	4	0	2
Henri Richard	C	75	12	37	49	46	13	1	0	1
Guy Lapointe	D	78	15	29	44	107	28	5	0	1
Frank Mahovlich	LW	38	17	24	41	11	4	4	1	2
John Ferguson	LW	60	16	14	30	162	2	3	0	4
Mickey Redmond	RW	40	14	15	29	35	12	2	0	1
Claude Larose	RW	64	10	13	23	90	−8	0	0	2
Terry Harper	D	78	1	21	22	116	35	0	0	0
Phil Roberto	RW	39	14	7	21	76	10	2	0	3
Rejean Houle	W	66	10	9	19	28	7	1	0	1
Jacques Laperriere	D	49	0	16	16	20	24	0	0	0
Leon Rochefort	RW	57	5	10	15	4	11	0	3	1
Serge Savard	D	37	5	10	15	30	11	0	1	0
Bobby Sheehan	C	29	6	5	11	2	4	1	0	1
Bill Collins	RW	40	6	2	8	39	1	0	0	1
Larry Pleau	C	19	1	5	6	8	−8	0	0	1
Ralph Backstrom	C	16	1	4	5	0	0	0	0	0
Guy Charron	C	15	2	2	4	2	−2	0	0	0
Fran Huck	C	5	1	2	3	0	3	0	0	0
Pierre Bouchard	D	51	0	3	3	50	3	0	0	0
Bob Murdoch	D	1	0	2	2	2	0	0	0	0
Phil Myre	G	30	0	1	1	17	0	0	0	0
Ken Dryden	G	6	0	0	0	0	0	0	0	0
Chuck Lefley	LW	1	0	0	0	0	−1	0	0	0
Rogie Vachon	G	47	0	0	0	0	0	0	0	0

==== Goaltending ====
Player	MIN	GP	W	L	T	GA	GAA	SO
Rogie Vachon	2676	47	23	12	9	118	2.65	2
Phil Myre	1677	30	13	11	4	87	3.11	1
Ken Dryden	327	6	6	0	0	9	1.65	0
Team:	4680	78	42	23	13	214	2.74	3

=== Playoffs ===
==== Scoring ====
Player	Pos	GP	G	A	Pts	PIM	PPG	SHG	GWG
Frank Mahovlich	LW	20	14	13	27	18	3	0	0
Yvan Cournoyer	RW	20	10	12	22	6	2	0	1
Jean Beliveau	C	20	6	16	22	28	2	0	0
Jacques Lemaire	C	20	9	10	19	17	4	0	1
J. C. Tremblay	D	20	3	14	17	15	1	0	3
Pete Mahovlich	C	20	10	6	16	43	1	1	1
Jacques Laperriere	D	20	4	9	13	12	1	0	1
Henri Richard	C	20	5	7	12	20	0	0	1
John Ferguson	LW	18	4	6	10	36	1	0	1
Guy Lapointe	D	20	4	5	9	34	1	0	2
Rejean Houle	W	20	2	5	7	20	0	0	1
Terry Harper	D	20	0	6	6	28	0	0	0
Marc Tardif	LW	20	3	1	4	40	0	0	0
Claude Larose	RW	11	1	0	1	10	0	0	0
Pierre Bouchard	D	13	0	1	1	10	0	0	0
Ken Dryden	G	20	0	1	1	0	0	0	0
Phil Roberto	RW	15	0	1	1	36	0	0	0
Chuck Lefley	LW	1	0	0	0	0	0	0	0
Bob Murdoch	D	2	0	0	0	0	0	0	0
Leon Rochefort	RW	10	0	0	0	6	0	0	0
Bobby Sheehan	C	6	0	0	0	0	0	0	0

==== Goaltending ====
Player	MIN	GP	W	L	GA	GAA	SO
Ken Dryden	1221	20	12	8	61	3.00	0
Team:	1221	20	12	8	61	3.00	0

Note:

Pos = Position;GP = Games played; G = Goals; A = Assists; Pts = Points; PIM = Penalty minutes; +/- = Plus/minus; PPG = Power-play goals; SHG = Short-handed goals; GWG = Game-winning goals
Pos = Position;GP = Games played; Min, TOI = Minutes played; W = Wins; L = Losses; T,T/OT = Ties; OTL = Overtime losses; GA = Goals-against; GAA = Goals-against average; SO = Shutouts; SA = Shots against; SV = Shots saved;SV% = Save percentage;

== Transactions ==
May 22, 1970	To Oakland Seals Dennis Hextall	To Montreal Canadiens cash
May 22, 1970	To Oakland Seals Ernie Hicke; 1st round pick in 1970 (Chris Oddleifson)	To Montreal Canadiens Francois Lacombe; 1st round pick in 1971 (Guy Lafleur)
May 22, 1970	To Los Angeles Kings Jack Norris; Larry Mickey; Lucien Grenier	To Montreal Canadiens Wayne Thomas; Leon Rochefort; Gregg Boddy
January 13, 1971	To Detroit Red Wings Mickey Redmond; Guy Charron; Bill Collins	To Montreal Canadiens Frank Mahovlich

== Awards and records ==
- Ken Dryden, Conn Smythe Trophy

== Draft picks ==
Montreal's draft picks at the 1970 NHL amateur draft held at the Queen Elizabeth Hotel in Montreal.

Round	#	Player	Nationality	College/Junior/Club team (League)
1	5	Ray Martynuik	Canada	Flin Flon Bombers (WCHL)
1	6	Chuck Lefley	Canada	Canadian National Development Team
3	31	Steve Carlyle	Canada	Red Deer Rustlers (AJHL)
4	45	Cal Hammond	Canada	Flin Flon Bombers (WCHL)
4	52	John French	Canada	Toronto Marlboros (OHA)
5	66	Rick Wilson	Canada	University of North Dakota (WCHA)
6	80	Bob Brown	Canada	Boston University (ECAC)
7	93	Bob Fowler	United States	Estevan Bruins (WCHL)
8	105	Ric Jordan	Canada	Boston University (ECAC)
