= John Arbour =

Canadian ice hockey player (born 1945)

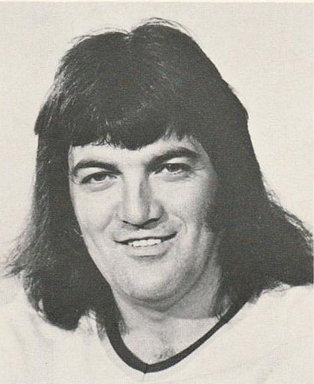
- Born: September 28, 1945 (age 80) Niagara Falls, Ontario, Canada
- Height: 5 ft 11 in (180 cm)
- Weight: 194 lb (88 kg; 13 st 12 lb)
- Position: Defence
- Shot: Left
- Played for: Boston Bruins; Pittsburgh Penguins; Vancouver Canucks; St. Louis Blues; Minnesota Fighting Saints (WHA); Calgary Cowboys (WHA)
- Playing career: 1965–1977

John Gilbert Arbour (born September 28, 1945) is a Canadian former professional ice hockey player who played in both the National Hockey League and the World Hockey Association. A stocky, physical defenceman, Arbour also developed an offensive dimension to his game later in his career.

== Playing career ==
=== NHL years ===
Arbour came up through the Boston Bruins organization, but only played 6 games in Boston before being sold to the Pittsburgh Penguins in 1968. He appeared in 17 games for the Penguins in 1968–69, but found himself in the Western Hockey League for 1969–70 with the Vancouver Canucks. After a fine season in Vancouver, Arbour was one of 6 players to remain a Vancouver Canuck when the team became an NHL franchise the following year. However, he only lasted 13 games before being dealt to the St. Louis Blues. 1970–71 would be his only full NHL campaign, as he appeared in 66 games between Vancouver and St. Louis, recording his only career NHL goal and 7 points. The following year, he appeared in 17 more games for the Blues, but again found himself mainly in the WHL.

=== WHA years ===
Arbour jumped to the upstart World Hockey Association in 1972, joining the Minnesota Fighting Saints. In Minnesota, he experienced the most successful portion of his pro career. He immediately established himself as one of the club's top defenceman, finishing his first season with 6 goals and 33 points, along with 186 penalty minutes. In 1973–74, his numbers continued to improve, as he led the Saints' defenceman in scoring with 6 goals and 49 points. In 1974–75, he posted career highs of 12 goals and 55 points, again the highest-scoring defenceman on his team.

Early in the 1975–76 season, he was dealt to the Denver Spurs, who ultimately folded mid-season. For 1976–77, he found himself back with the Fighting Saints, but finished out the season with the Calgary Cowboys after Minnesota, too, folded mid-year. He then chose to retire from pro hockey.

Arbour appeared in 106 NHL games, recording 1 goal and 10 points, along with 149 PIM. He also recorded 30 goals and 194 points in 335 WHA games, along with 568 PIM.

== Career statistics ==
=== Regular season and playoffs ===
			Regular season					Playoffs
Season	Team	League	GP	G	A	Pts	PIM	GP	G	A	Pts	PIM
1963–64	Niagara Falls Flyers	OHA	56	12	6	18	0	—	—	—	—	—
1965–66	Niagara Falls Flyers	OHA	47	13	31	44	196	—	—	—	—	—
1965–66	Boston Bruins	NHL	2	0	0	0	0	—	—	—	—	—
1965–66	Oklahoma City Blazers	CHL	3	0	0	0	0	3	0	0	0	0
1966–67	Oklahoma City Blazers	CHL	67	3	21	24	140	9	0	1	1	11
1967–68	Oklahoma City Blazers	CHL	62	2	15	17	224	7	1	0	1	42
1967–68	Boston Bruins	NHL	4	0	1	1	11	—	—	—	—	—
1968–69	Baltimore Clippers	AHL	59	4	17	21	157	4	0	0	0	15
1968–69	Pittsburgh Penguins	NHL	17	0	2	2	35	—	—	—	—	—
1969–70	Vancouver Canucks	WHL	72	7	28	35	251	11	2	3	5	42
1970–71	Vancouver Canucks	NHL	13	0	0	0	12	—	—	—	—	—
1970–71	St. Louis Blues	NHL	53	1	6	7	81	5	0	0	0	0
1971–72	Denver Spurs	WHL	20	4	12	16	73	—	—	—	—	—
1971–72	St. Louis Blues	NHL	17	0	0	0	10	—	—	—	—	—
1972–73	Minnesota Fighting Saints	WHA	76	6	27	33	186	6	0	3	3	22
1973–74	Minnesota Fighting Saints	WHA	77	6	43	49	192	11	3	6	9	27
1974–75	Minnesota Fighting Saints	WHA	70	12	43	55	67	12	0	6	6	23
1975–76	Minnesota Fighting Saints	WHA	7	0	4	4	14	—	—	—	—	—
1975–76	Denver Spurs/Ottawa Civics	WHA	35	2	13	15	49	—	—	—	—	—
1976–77	Calgary Cowboys	WHA	37	1	15	16	38	—	—	—	—	—
1976–77	Minnesota Fighting Saints	WHA	33	3	19	22	22	—	—	—	—	—
WHA totals			335	30	164	194	568	29	3	15	18	72
NHL totals			106	1	9	10	149	5	0	0	0	0
