= Bob Sneddon (ice hockey) =

Canadian ice hockey player (born 1944)

- Born: May 31, 1944 (age 82) Montreal, Quebec, Canada
- Height: 6 ft 2 in (188 cm)
- Weight: 194 lb (88 kg; 13 st 12 lb)
- Position: Goaltender
- Caught: Right
- Played for: California Golden Seals
- Playing career: 1964–1980

Robert Allan Sneddon (born May 31, 1944) is a Canadian retired professional ice hockey player. He played in seven games with the California Golden Seals during the 1970–71 NHL season.

== Career statistics ==
=== Regular season and playoffs ===
			Regular season									Playoffs
Season	Team	League	GP	W	L	T	MIN	GA	SO	GAA	SV%	GP	W	L	MIN	GA	SO	GAA	SV%
1963–64	St. Catharines Black Hawks	OHA	52	29	16	7	3080	184	4	3.58	—	11	—	—	660	45	1	4.09	—
1964–65	Port Huron Flags	IHL	45	—	—	—	2700	230	0	4.89	—	—	—	—	—	—	—	—	—
1965–66	Port Huron Flags	IHL	67	—	—	—	3980	254	5	3.83	—	9	8	1	540	27	0	3.00	—
1966–67	St. Louis Braves	CHL	20	7	7	6	1200	66	1	3.30	—	—	—	—	—	—	—	—	—
1967–68	Dallas Black Hawks	CHL	36	17	14	1	1777	119	3	4.02	.884	5	2	3	300	11	1	2.20	—
1968–69	Portland Buckaroos	WHL	2	0	0	1	80	7	0	5.26	.857	—	—	—	—	—	—	—	—
1968–69	Quebec Aces	AHL	13	5	4	1	626	37	0	3.55	—	—	—	—	—	—	—	—	—
1969–70	Springfield Kings	AHL	27	—	—	—	1439	108	0	4.34	—	8	—	—	481	30	0	3.74	—
1970–71	California Golden Seals	NHL	7	0	2	0	224	21	0	5.63	.835	—	—	—	—	—	—	—	—
1970–71	Providence Reds	AHL	16	7	6	1	807	55	1	4.19	—	—	—	—	—	—	—	—	—
1971–72	Tidewater Wings	AHL	5	1	3	0	213	14	0	3.94	—	—	—	—	—	—	—	—	—
1971–72	Seattle Totems	WHL	23	3	13	2	1174	104	0	5.31	.848	—	—	—	—	—	—	—	—
1972–73	Springfield Kings	AHL	36	—	—	—	1936	133	0	4.12	—	—	—	—	—	—	—	—	—
1973–74	Rochester Americans	AHL	31	15	9	6	1807	114	1	3.78	.930	2	0	2	120	10	0	5.00	—
1974–75	Rochester Americans	AHL	35	22	7	2	1924	101	0	3.14	.890	1	0	1	60	6	0	6.00	—
1975–76	Baltimore Clippers	AHL	19	3	13	1	1049	91	0	5.20	—	—	—	—	—	—	—	—	—
1976–77	Broome Dusters	NAHL	16	8	6	1	901	70	0	4.53	.855	—	—	—	—	—	—	—	—
1976–77	Johnstown Jets	NAHL	16	3	11	0	913	75	0	4.93	.864	—	—	—	—	—	—	—	—
1977–78	Brantford Alexanders	OHA Sr	24	—	—	—	1485	104	0	4.20	—	—	—	—	—	—	—	—	—
1978–79	Welland Cougars	OHA Sr	34	—	—	—	2085	201	0	5.78	—	—	—	—	—	—	—	—	—
1979–80	Dundas Blues	OHA Sr	20	—	—	—	1050	96	0	4.61	—	—	—	—	—	—	—	—	—
NHL totals			7	0	2	0	224	21	0	5.63	.835	—	—	—	—	—	—	—	—
