= 1970–71 Vancouver Canucks season =

1st season in franchise history

1970–71 Vancouver Canucks
- Division: 6th East
- 1970–71 record: 24–46–8
- Home record: 17–18–4
- Road record: 7–28–4
- Goals for: 229
- Goals against: 296

Team information
- General manager: Bud Poile
- Coach: Hal Laycoe
- Captain: Orland Kurtenbach
- Alternate captains: Ray Cullen; Gary Doak; Garth Rizzuto
- Arena: Pacific Coliseum
- Average attendance: 15,577

Team leaders
- Goals: Rosaire Paiement (34)
- Assists: Dale Tallon (42)
- Points: Andre Boudrias (66)
- Penalty minutes: Rosaire Paiement (152)
- Wins: Charlie Hodge (15)
- Goals against average: George Gardner (3.38)

The 1970–71 Vancouver Canucks season was the Canucks' first in the National Hockey League (NHL). They joined the league on May 22, 1970, along with the Buffalo Sabres. After not being awarded an expansion team in 1967 when the league added six teams, Vancouver finally joined the NHL in 1970 for a price of $6 million (compared to $2 million in 1967). The Vancouver Canucks of the Western Hockey League were promoted to the NHL, though the ownership group of the WHL Canucks, not willing to pay the $6 million to join the NHL, sold the team to Medicor, a group controlled by Thomas Scallen.

The Canucks logo was a stylized C designed as a hockey stick inside a rink incorporating the colours of blue, green and white to represent the water, forests and snow surrounding Vancouver. It was designed by a local creative designer, Joe Borovich, and bought for $500.

== Season summary ==
During the Amateur draft, held on June 11 in Montreal, there was debate over what expansion team would draft first. In order to reach a compromise, a numbered spinning wheel was brought in to determine the draft: the Sabres were odd numbers, the Canucks even. When the wheel landed on 11, the Canucks and NHL President Clarence Campbell thought it was II (two) in Roman numerals. However it turned out to be 11 (eleven) in Arabic numerals, leading the Sabres to select first overall future superstar Gilbert Perreault.

On October 9, 1970, the Canucks played their first game in the NHL, a 3–1 loss to the Los Angeles Kings. There was a grand opening ceremony attended by British Columbia Premier W. A. C. Bennett, Mayor of Vancouver Tom Campbell (who was booed by fans), Chief Dan George and former Vancouver Millionaires player Cyclone Taylor, who received a standing ovation upon being introduced. Barry Wilkins scored the first goal for the Canucks in the third period.

Inexplicably, the Canucks were placed in the East Division, which was not only the tougher division but featured opponents over 2,000 miles away from Vancouver. (The Canucks were nearly a .500 team at home, but could only win seven of 39 road games.) Throughout the first three months of the season, though, the expansion club managed to stay within contention of a playoff spot, until captain Orland Kurtenbach injured his knee in late December. The Canucks would finish their inaugural season with six 20-goal scorers, and Tallon would break Bobby Orr's rookie record for defenseman assists, but 11-30-5 mark to end the season placed them only one point out of last place.

== Regular season ==
East Division
		GP	W	L	T	GF	GA	DIFF	Pts
1	Boston Bruins	78	57	14	7	399	207	+192	121
2	New York Rangers	78	49	18	11	259	177	+82	109
3	Montreal Canadiens	78	42	23	13	291	216	+75	97
4	Toronto Maple Leafs	78	37	33	8	248	211	+37	82
5	Buffalo Sabres	78	24	39	15	217	291	−74	63
6	Vancouver Canucks	78	24	46	8	229	296	−67	56
7	Detroit Red Wings	78	22	45	11	209	308	−99	55

=== Record vs. opponents ===
==== Vs. East Division ====
1970–71 NHL records
Team	BOS	BUF	DET	MTL	NYR	TOR	VAN	Total
Boston	—	4–1–1	5–1	5–1	2–2–2	5–1	5–1	26–7–3
Buffalo	1–4–1	—	3–3	0–3–3	0–4–2	1–5	3–3	8–22–6
Detroit	1–5	3–3	—	1–4–1	1–4–1	1–4–1	4–2	11–22–3
Montreal	1–5	3–0–3	4–1–1	—	3–3	2–4	4–0–2	17–13–6
New York	2–2–2	4–0–2	4–1–1	3–3	—	5–1	5–1	23–8–5
Toronto	1–5	5–1	4–1–1	4–2	1–5	—	3–3	18–17–1
Vancouver	1–5	3–3	2–4	0–4–2	1–5	3–3	—	10–24–2

==== Vs. West Division ====
1970–71 NHL records
Team	CAL	CHI	LAK	MIN	PHI	PIT	STL	Total
Boston	5–1	2–3–1	5–1	5–0–1	6–0	4–1–1	4–1–1	31–7–4
Buffalo	3–3	0–5–1	2–1–3	5–1	2–3–1	2–0–4	2–4	16–17–9
Detroit	4–2	0–6	1–2–3	2–3–1	3–2–1	1–3–2	0–5–1	11–23–8
Montreal	5–1	3–3	4–2	3–1–2	4–1–1	3–1–2	3–1–2	25–10–7
New York	3–2–1	3–3	4–0–2	6–0	2–3–1	5–0–1	3–2–1	26–6–10
Toronto	3–2–1	3–2–1	3–3	2–2–2	2–3–1	3–2–1	3–2–1	19–16–7
Vancouver	5–1	0–5–1	3–2–1	2–3–1	2–4	1–4–1	1–3–2	14–22–6

== Schedule and results ==
1970–71 regular season
October: 3–6–2 (home: 3–2–2; road: 0–4–0)

#	Date	Visitor	Score	Home	Record	Pts
1	October 9	Los Angeles	3–1	Vancouver	0–1–0	0
2	October 11	Toronto	3–5	Vancouver	1–1–0	2
3	October 12	Vancouver	1–4	St. Louis	1–2–0	2
4	October 14	Vancouver	2–8	Chicago	1–3–0	2
5	October 15	Vancouver	4–5	Philadelphia	1–4–0	2
6	October 18	Boston	5–3	Vancouver	1–5–0	2
7	October 20	California	1–2	Vancouver	2–5–0	4
8	October 23	St. Louis	1–1	Vancouver	2–5–1	5
9	October 25	Pittsburgh	1–1	Vancouver	2–5–2	6
10	October 27	Buffalo	2–7	Vancouver	3–5–2	8
11	October 31	Vancouver	3–6	Montreal	3–6–2	8

November: 6–7–1 (home: 3–1–0; road: 3–6–1)

#	Date	Visitor	Score	Home	Record	Pts
12	November 4	Vancouver	3–8	Pittsburgh	3–7–2	8
13	November 5	Vancouver	4–1	Buffalo	4–7–2	10
14	November 7	Toronto	2–3	Vancouver	5–7–2	12
15	November 10	Vancouver	3–6	Boston	5–8–2	12
16	November 11	Vancouver	4–2	Toronto	6–8–2	14
17	November 14	Vancouver	3 -3	Minnesota	6–8–3	15
18	November 15	Vancouver	2–4	Chicago	6–9–3	15
19	November 17	Detroit	5–2	Vancouver	6–10–3	15
20	November 20	Los Angeles	1–7	Vancouver	7–10–3	17
21	November 21	Vancouver	3–1	Los Angeles	8–10–3	19
22	November 24	Minnesota	2–3	Vancouver	9–10–3	21
23	November 26	Vancouver	2–4	Detroit	9–11–3	21
24	November 28	Vancouver	1–5	St. Louis	9–12–3	21
25	November 29	Vancouver	2–4	Philadelphia	9–13–3	21

December: 5–7–0 (home: 4–2–0; road: 1–5–0)

#	Date	Visitor	Score	Home	Record	Pts
26	December 1	Philadelphia	4–5	Vancouver	10–13–3	23
27	December 5	Vancouver	1–3	Pittsburgh	10–14–3	23
28	December 6	Vancouver	1–4	New York	10–15–3	23
29	December 8	New York	1–4	Vancouver	11–15–3	25
30	December 9	Vancouver	1–6	California	11–16–3	25
31	December 12	California	2–5	Vancouver	12–16–3	27
32	December 15	Philadelphia	2–3	Vancouver	13–16–3	29
33	December 18	Montreal	4–3	Vancouver	13–17–3	29
34	December 20	Vancouver	1–5	New York	13–18–3	29
35	December 23	Vancouver	2–7	Toronto	13–19–3	29
36	December 26	Chicago	4–2	Vancouver	13–20–3	29
37	December 30	Vancouver	4–1	Los Angeles	14–20–3	31

January: 1–10–2 (home: 0–6–1; road: 1–4–1)

#	Date	Visitor	Score	Home	Record	Pts
38	January 2	St. Louis	3–1	Vancouver	14–21–3	31
39	January 6	Vancouver	3–7	Montreal	14–22–3	31
40	January 7	Vancouver	4–6	Boston	14–23–3	31
41	January 9	Vancouver	2–2	St. Louis	14–23–4	32
42	January 12	New York	4–2	Vancouver	14–24–4	32
43	January 16	Pittsburgh	4–3	Vancouver	14–25–4	32
44	January 17	Vancouver	3–1	California	15–25–4	34
45	January 20	Toronto	5–1	Vancouver	15–26–4	34
46	January 23	Vancouver	1–4	Pittsburgh	15–27–4	34
47	January 24	Vancouver	3–7	Detroit	15–28–4	34
48	January 26	Chicago	3–3	Vancouver	15–28–5	35
49	January 29	Minnesota	2–1	Vancouver	15–29–5	35
50	January 31	Buffalo	6–1	Vancouver	15–30–5	35

February: 3–7–1 (home: 3–3–1; road: 0–4–0)

#	Date	Visitor	Score	Home	Record	Pts
51	February 2	Montreal	5–2	Vancouver	15–31–5	35
52	February 6	New York	5–4	Vancouver	15–32–5	35
53	February 9	Buffalo	3–6	Vancouver	16–32–5	37
54	February 12	Detroit	3–5	Vancouver	17–32–5	39
55	February 14	Vancouver	1–3	Chicago	17–33–5	39
56	February 16	Boston	4–5	Vancouver	18–33–5	41
57	February 19	Philadelphia	3–2	Vancouver	18–34–5	41
58	February 22	Montreal	3–3	Vancouver	18–34–6	42
59	February 25	Vancouver	3–8	Boston	18–35–6	42
60	February 27	Vancouver	1–8	Philadelphia	18–36–6	42
61	February 28	Vancouver	2–4	New York	18–37–6	42

March: 5–8–2 (home: 4–3–0; road: 1–5–2)

#	Date	Visitor	Score	Home	Record	Pts
62	March 3	Vancouver	1–3	Toronto	18–38–6	42
63	March 6	Vancouver	1–3	Minnesota	18–39–6	42
64	March 7	Vancouver	3–6	Buffalo	18–40–6	42
65	March 9	Vancouver	3–3	Montreal	18–40–7	43
66	March 11	Detroit	3–7	Vancouver	19–40–7	45
67	March 13	Boston	6–3	Vancouver	19–41–7	45
68	March 16	Chicago	7–4	Vancouver	19–42–7	45
69	March 19	Pittsburgh	4–6	Vancouver	20–42–7	47
70	March 21	Minnesota	6–3	Vancouver	20–43–7	47
71	March 23	St. Louis	1–4	Vancouver	21–43–7	49
72	March 25	Vancouver	3–4	Detroit	21–44–7	49
73	March 26	Vancouver	1–3	Buffalo	21–45–7	49
74	March 28	California	5–11	Vancouver	22–45–7	51
75	March 30	Vancouver	2–1	Minnesota	23–45–7	53
76	March 31	Vancouver	2–2	Los Angeles	23–45–8	54

April: 1–1–0 (home: 0–1–0; road: 1–0–0)

#	Date	Visitor	Score	Home	Record	Pts
77	April 2	Vancouver	7–2	California	24–45–8	56
78	April 4	Los Angeles	4–2	Vancouver	24–46–8	56

Legend: Win (2 points) Loss (0 points) Tie (1 point)

== Player statistics ==
=== Skaters ===
Note: GP = Games played; G = Goals; A = Assists; Pts = Points; PIM = Penalty minutes

		Regular season					Playoffs
Player	#	GP	G	A	Pts	PIM	GP	G	A	Pts	PIM
Andre Boudrias	7	77	25	41	66	16	--	–	–	–	–
Wayne Maki	11	78	25	38	63	99	–	–	–	–	–
Rosaire Paiement	15	78	34	28	62	152	–	–	–	–	–
Murray Hall	23	77	21	38	59	22	–	–	–	–	–
Dale Tallon	19	78	14	42	56	58	–	–	–	–	–
Orland Kurtenbach	25	52	21	32	53	84	–	–	–	–	–
Mike Corrigan	12	76	21	32	53	103	–	–	–	–	–
Ray Cullen	10	70	12	21	33	42	–	–	–	–	–
Poul Popiel	18	78	10	22	32	61	–	–	–	–	–
Ted Taylor	16	56	11	16	27	53	–	–	–	–	–
Dan Johnson	8	66	15	11	26	16	–	–	–	–	–
Barry Wilkins	4	50	5	18	23	131	–	–	–	–	–
Pat Quinn	3	76	2	11	13	149	–	–	–	–	–
Gary Doak	2	77	2	10	12	112	–	–	–	–	–
Bobby Schmautz	9	26	5	5	10	14	–	–	–	–	–
Garth Rizzuto	22	37	3	4	7	16	–	–	–	–	–
Danny Seguin^{†}	17	25	0	5	5	46	–	–	–	–	–
John Schella	5	38	0	5	5	58	–	–	–	–	–
Len Lunde	–	20	1	3	4	2	–	–	–	–	–
Ed Hatoum	–	26	1	3	4	21	–	–	–	–	–
Jim Wiste	–	23	1	2	3	0	–	–	–	–	–
Howie Young	–	11	0	2	2	25	–	–	–	–	–
Marc Reaume	–	27	0	2	2	4	–	–	–	–	–
Darryl Sly	–	31	0	2	2	10	–	–	–	–	–
Ralph Stewart	–	3	0	1	1	0	–	–	–	–	–
Jim Hargreaves	–	7	0	1	1	33	–	–	–	–	–
Ken Block	–	1	0	0	0	0	–	–	–	–	–
Bob Cook	–	2	0	0	0	0	–	–	–	–	–
John Arbour*	–	13	0	0	0	12	–	–	–	–	–
George Gardner	30	18	0	0	0	0	–	–	–	–	–
Charlie Hodge	1	0	0	0	0	0	–	–	–	–	–
Dunc Wilson	30	35	0	0	0	18	–	–	–	–	–

^{†}Denotes player spent time with another team before joining Vancouver. Stats reflect time with the Canucks only.

*Denotes player traded by Vancouver midway through the season. Stats reflect time with Canucks only.

=== Goaltenders ===
Note: GP = Games played; Min = Minutes; W = Wins; L = Losses; T = Ties; GA = Goals against; SO = Shutouts; GAA = Goals against average

		Regular season								Playoffs
Player	#	GP	Min	W	L	T	GA	SO	GAA	GP	Min	W	L	GA	SO	GAA
George Gardner	30	18	922	6	8	1	52	0	3.38	–	–	–	–	–	–	–
Charlie Hodge	1	35	1967	15	13	5	112	0	3.41	–	–	–	–	–	–	–
Dunc Wilson	30	35	1793	3	25	2	128	0	4.28	–	–	–	–	–	–	–

== Awards and records ==
=== Trophies and awards ===
- Cyclone Taylor Award (Canucks MVP): Orland Kurtenbach
- Cyrus H. McLean Trophy (Canucks Leading Scorer): Andre Boudrias
- Fred J. Hume Award (Canucks Unsung Hero): Barry Wilkins
- Most Exciting Player: Andre Boudrias

=== Records achieved in the season ===
Note: Only records that stand as of 2020–21 are listed

==== Canucks team records ====
- Fewest ties in one season: (8) – repeated in 1971–72, 1986–87, 1988–89
- Fewest shutouts in one season: (0) – repeated in 1984–85, 2005–06
- Fewest shutouts against in one season: (0) – repeated in 1984–85
- Longest home winless streak: 11 games, December 18, 1970 – February 6, 1971 (0–10–1)
- Most goals in one game: 11, March 28, 1971 (California 5 at Vancouver 11) – repeated in 1986–87, 1991–92
- Most shots against Vancouver goal, one game: 60, February 25, 1971, versus Boston Bruins
- Most shots against Vancouver goal, one period: 28, February 25, 1971, versus Boston Bruins (3rd period)
- Most shots both teams, one period: 43, February 25, 1971, versus Boston Bruins (3rd period)
- Fastest three goals against Vancouver: :20, February 25, 1971, versus Boston Bruins (3rd period: John Bucyk, 4:50; Ed Westfall, 5:02; Ted Green, 5:10)

==== Canucks individual records ====
- Most assists in one season, rookie: Dale Tallon (42)
- Most goals, one game: Rosaire Paiement (4) – repeated eleven times

== Transactions ==
The Canucks were involved in the following transactions during the 1970–71 season.

=== Trades ===
June 10, 1970	To Vancouver Canucks John Arbour	To Pittsburgh Penguins Cash
December 3, 1970	To Vancouver Canucks Cash	To St. Louis Blues John Arbour
May 25, 1971	To Vancouver Canucks Gregg Boddy	To Montreal Canadiens Cash; 3rd round pick (Jim Cahoon) in 1971 NHL amateur draft

== Draft picks ==
=== Expansion draft ===
Vancouver's picks at the 1970 NHL expansion draft. In order to fill out the rosters of both the Canucks and Buffalo Sabres, they were given the opportunity to select eighteen skaters and two goaltenders from the unprotected lists of existing NHL team's rosters. Teams were allowed to protect several players from being drafted, and as such kept many of their star players, leaving the Canucks and Sabres with lesser quality players to choose from. The draft was held on June 9, 1970, at the Queen Elizabeth Hotel in Montreal, Canada. Using a spinning wheel to determine the order of the expansion draft, Buffalo had the first choice.

#	Player	Drafted from
1.	Gary Doak (D)	Boston Bruins
2.	Orland Kurtenbach (C)	New York Rangers
3.	Ray Cullen (C)	Minnesota North Stars
4.	Pat Quinn (D)	Toronto Maple Leafs
5.	Rosaire Paiement (C)	Philadelphia Flyers
6.	Wayne Maki (LW)	St. Louis Blues
7.	Barry Wilkins (D)	Boston Bruins
8.	Andre Boudrias (C)	St. Louis Blues
9.	Mike Corrigan (LW)	Los Angeles Kings
10.	Poul Popiel (D)	Detroit Red Wings
11.	Dan Johnson (C)	Toronto Maple Leafs
12.	Garth Rizzuto (C)	Chicago Black Hawks
13.	Ed Hatoum (RW)	Detroit Red Wings
14.	Jim Wiste (C)	Chicago Black Hawks
15.	Howie Young (D)	Chicago Black Hawks
16.	Darryl Sly (D)	Minnesota North Stars
17.	Ralph Stewart (C)	St. Louis Blues
18.	John Arbour (D)	Pittsburgh Penguins
19.	Charlie Hodge G	Oakland Seals
20.	Dunc Wilson (G)	Philadelphia Flyers

=== Amateur draft ===
Vancouver's picks at the 1970 NHL amateur draft. The draft was held on June 11, 1970, at the Queen Elizabeth Hotel in Montreal, Canada.

Round	#	Player	Nationality	College/junior/club team (league)
1	2	Dale Tallon (D)	Canada	Toronto Marlboros (OHA)
2	16	Jim Hargreaves (D)	Canada	Winnipeg Jets (WCHL)
3	30	Ed Dyck (G)	Canada	Calgary Centennials (WCHL)
4	44	Brent Taylor (RW)	Canada	Estevan Bruins (WCHL)
5	58	Bill McFadden	Canada	Swift Current Broncos (WCHL)
6	72	Dave Gilmour (LW)	Canada	London Knights (OHA)
