= Paul Andrea =

Canadian former ice hockey right winger

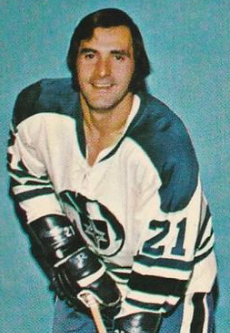
- Andrea in 1972–73
- Born: July 31, 1941 (age 85) North Sydney, Nova Scotia, Canada
- Height: 5 ft 10 in (178 cm)
- Weight: 170 lb (77 kg; 12 st 2 lb)
- Position: Right wing
- Shot: Left
- Played for: New York Rangers; Pittsburgh Penguins; California Golden Seals; Buffalo Sabres; Cleveland Crusaders (WHA)
- Playing career: 1961–1975

Paul Lawrence Andrea (born July 31, 1941) is a Canadian former ice hockey right winger. He played in the National Hockey League for the New York Rangers, Pittsburgh Penguins, California Golden Seals, and Buffalo Sabres. He also played in the World Hockey Association for the Cleveland Crusaders.

In his NHL career, Andrea played in 150 games, scoring 31 goals and adding 49 assists. He played in 135 WHA games, scoring 36 goals and adding 48 assists.

Born in North Sydney, Nova Scotia, Andrea currently lives in Sydney, Nova Scotia.

== Career statistics ==
=== Regular season and playoffs ===
			Regular season					Playoffs
Season	Team	League	GP	G	A	Pts	PIM	GP	G	A	Pts	PIM
1958–59	Guelph Biltmores	OHA	23	5	0	5	0	—	—	—	—	—
1959–60	Guelph Biltmores	OHA	48	11	20	31	0	—	—	—	—	—
1960–61	Guelph Royals	OHA	48	29	33	62	0	—	—	—	—	—
1960–61	Kitchener-Waterloo Beavers	EPHL	2	0	0	0	0	—	—	—	—	—
1961–62	Vancouver Canucks	WHL	24	4	1	5	0	—	—	—	—	—
1961–62	Kitchener-Waterloo Beavers	EPHL	16	4	0	4	8	7	2	2	4	2
1962–63	Sudbury Wolves	EPHL	28	9	10	19	8	8	2	1	3	4
1963–64	St. Paul Rangers	CHL	71	27	30	57	12	11	2	2	4	2
1964–65	St. Paul Rangers	CHL	65	25	39	64	8	11	3	4	7	0
1965–66	New York Rangers	NHL	4	1	1	2	0	—	—	—	—	—
1965–66	Minnesota Rangers	CHL	64	37	43	80	12	7	1	3	4	2
1966–67	Omaha Knights	CHL	69	37	46	83	22	12	6	7	13	2
1967–68	Pittsburgh Penguins	NHL	65	11	21	32	2	—	—	—	—	—
1968–69	Pittsburgh Penguins	NHL	25	7	6	13	2	—	—	—	—	—
1968–69	Amarillo Wranglers	CHL	47	23	29	52	22	—	—	—	—	—
1969–70	Vancouver Canucks	WHL	72	44	47	91	13	11	5	7	12	6
1970–71	California Golden Seals	NHL	9	1	0	1	2	—	—	—	—	—
1970–71	Buffalo Sabres	NHL	47	11	21	32	4	—	—	—	—	—
1971–72	Cincinnati Swords	AHL	69	14	58	72	18	10	5	6	11	6
1972–73	Cleveland Crusaders	WHA	66	21	30	51	12	9	2	8	10	2
1973–74	Cleveland Crusaders	WHA	69	15	18	33	14	5	1	0	1	0
1973–74	Jacksonville Barons	AHL	8	1	3	4	2	—	—	—	—	—
1974–75	Tulsa Oilers	CHL	9	5	1	6	0	—	—	—	—	—
1974–75	Cape Codders	NAHL	33	8	32	40	26	4	0	4	4	0
WHA totals			135	36	48	84	26	14	3	8	11	2
NHL totals			150	31	49	80	10	—	—	—	—	—
