= 1970–71 Los Angeles Kings season =

National Hockey League team season

1970–71 Los Angeles Kings
- Division: 5th West
- 1970–71 record: 25–40–13
- Home record: 17–14–8
- Road record: 8–26–5
- Goals for: 239
- Goals against: 303

Team information
- General manager: Larry Regan
- Coach: Larry Regan
- Captain: Bob Pulford
- Alternate captains: Gilles Marotte; Larry Mickey; Noel Price
- Arena: Los Angeles Forum

Team leaders
- Goals: Mike Byers (27)
- Assists: Juha Widing (40)
- Points: Juha Widing (65)
- Penalty minutes: Gilles Marotte (96)
- Wins: Denis DeJordy (18)
- Goals against average: Denis DeJordy (3.80)

The 1970–71 Los Angeles Kings season was the Kings' fourth season of operation in the National Hockey League (NHL). The Kings finished in fifth place in the West Division and did not qualify for the playoffs.

== Regular season ==
=== Final standings ===
West Division
		GP	W	L	T	GF	GA	DIFF	Pts
1	Chicago Black Hawks	78	49	20	9	277	184	+93	107
2	St. Louis Blues	78	34	25	19	223	208	+15	87
3	Philadelphia Flyers	78	28	33	17	207	225	−18	73
4	Minnesota North Stars	78	28	34	16	191	223	−32	72
5	Los Angeles Kings	78	25	40	13	239	303	−64	63
6	Pittsburgh Penguins	78	21	37	20	221	240	−19	62
7	California Golden Seals	78	20	53	5	199	320	−121	45

=== Record vs. opponents ===
==== Vs. West Division ====
1970–71 NHL records
Team	CAL	CHI	LAK	MIN	PHI	PIT	STL	Total
California	—	1–5	1–5	2–4	2–3–1	1–4–1	1–4–1	8–25–3
Chicago	5–1	—	4–2	3–2–1	4–1–1	4–2	2–1–3	22–9–5
Los Angeles	5–1	2–4	—	0–5–1	1–2–3	4–2	2–4	14–18–4
Minnesota	4–2	2–3–1	5–0–1	—	1–2–3	3–1–2	3–1–2	18–9–9
Philadelphia	3–2–1	1–4–1	2–1–3	2–1–3	—	3–1–2	1–3–2	12–12–12
Pittsburgh	4–1–1	2–4	2–4	1–3–2	1–3–2	—	0–3–3	10–18–8
St. Louis	4–1–1	1–2–3	4–2	1–3–2	3–1–2	3–0–3	—	16–9–11

==== Vs. East Division ====
1970–71 NHL records
Team	BOS	BUF	DET	MTL	NYR	TOR	VAN	Total
California	1–5	3–3	2–4	1–5	2–3–1	2–3–1	1–5	12–28–2
Chicago	3–2–1	5–0–1	6–0	3–3	3–3	2–3–1	5–0–1	27–11–4
Los Angeles	1–5	1–2–3	2–1–3	2–4	0–4–2	3–3	2–3–1	11–22–9
Minnesota	0–5–1	1–5	3–2–1	1–3–2	0–6	2–2–2	3–2–1	10–25–7
Philadelphia	0–6	3–2–1	2–3–1	1–4–1	3–2–1	3–2–1	4–2	16–21–5
Pittsburgh	1–4–1	0–2–4	3–1–2	1–3–2	0–5–1	2–3–1	4–1–1	11–19–12
St. Louis	1–4–1	4–2	5–0–1	1–3–2	2–3–1	2–3–1	3–1–2	18–16–8

== Schedule and results ==
1970–71 regular season
October

Game	Result	Date	Score	Opponent	Record
1	W	October 9, 1970	3–1	@ Vancouver Canucks (1970–71)	1–0–0
2	L	October 14, 1970	5–8	Boston Bruins (1970–71)	1–1–0
3	W	October 17, 1970	6–1	California Golden Seals (1970–71)	2–1–0
4	W	October 21, 1970	4–2	Pittsburgh Penguins (1970–71)	3–1–0
5	W	October 24, 1970	3–1	St. Louis Blues (1970–71)	4–1–0
6	L	October 28, 1970	3–5	@ Pittsburgh Penguins (1970–71)	4–2–0
7	L	October 29, 1970	1–3	@ Philadelphia Flyers (1970–71)	4–3–0
8	L	October 31, 1970	0–3	@ St. Louis Blues (1970–71)	4–4–0

November

Game	Result	Date	Score	Opponent	Record
9	W	November 1, 1970	4–2	Buffalo Sabres (1970–71)	5–4–0
10	W	November 4, 1970	3–2	Toronto Maple Leafs (1970–71)	6–4–0
11	L	November 7, 1970	2–6	New York Rangers (1970–71)	6–5–0
12	W	November 10, 1970	5–1	@ Pittsburgh Penguins (1970–71)	7–5–0
13	L	November 11, 1970	1–3	@ Minnesota North Stars (1970–71)	7–6–0
14	T	November 15, 1970	4–4	Detroit Red Wings (1970–71)	7–6–1
15	L	November 18, 1970	3–5	New York Rangers (1970–71)	7–7–1
16	L	November 20, 1970	1–7	@ Vancouver Canucks (1970–71)	7–8–1
17	L	November 21, 1970	1–3	Vancouver Canucks (1970–71)	7–9–1
18	W	November 25, 1970	3–1	@ California Golden Seals (1970–71)	8–9–1
19	L	November 28, 1970	2–3	Minnesota North Stars (1970–71)	8–10–1
20	L	November 29, 1970	3–5	@ Chicago Black Hawks (1970–71)	8–11–1

December

Game	Result	Date	Score	Opponent	Record
21	L	December 2, 1970	0–7	@ Toronto Maple Leafs (1970–71)	8–12–1
22	T	December 3, 1970	4–4	@ Detroit Red Wings (1970–71)	8–12–2
23	T	December 5, 1970	4–4	Philadelphia Flyers (1970–71)	8–12–3
24	T	December 9, 1970	2–2	New York Rangers (1970–71)	8–12–4
25	L	December 12, 1970	1–8	@ Montreal Canadiens (1970–71)	8–13–4
26	L	December 13, 1970	0–4	@ New York Rangers (1970–71)	8–14–4
27	L	December 16, 1970	4–6	@ Boston Bruins (1970–71)	8–15–4
28	L	December 17, 1970	3–4	@ Buffalo Sabres (1970–71)	8–16–4
29	T	December 19, 1970	2–2	Philadelphia Flyers (1970–71)	8–16–5
30	W	December 20, 1970	7–2	Montreal Canadiens (1970–71)	9–16–5
31	L	December 23, 1970	4–6	Chicago Black Hawks (1970–71)	9–17–5
32	W	December 26, 1970	9–3	California Golden Seals (1970–71)	10–17–5
33	L	December 30, 1970	1–4	Vancouver Canucks (1970–71)	10–18–5

January

Game	Result	Date	Score	Opponent	Record
34	T	January 2, 1971	3–3	Minnesota North Stars (1970–71)	10–18–6
35	L	January 3, 1971	3–7	St. Louis Blues (1970–71)	10–19–6
36	W	January 6, 1971	4–2	@ Chicago Black Hawks (1970–71)	11–19–6
37	T	January 7, 1971	5–5	@ Philadelphia Flyers (1970–71)	11–19–7
38	L	January 9, 1971	0–1	@ Montreal Canadiens (1970–71)	11–20–7
39	T	January 10, 1971	2–2	@ Buffalo Sabres (1970–71)	11–20–8
40	L	January 13, 1971	2–4	@ Pittsburgh Penguins (1970–71)	11–21–8
41	L	January 14, 1971	5–9	@ Boston Bruins (1970–71)	11–22–8
42	L	January 16, 1971	1–8	@ Toronto Maple Leafs (1970–71)	11–23–8
43	W	January 17, 1971	4–1	@ Philadelphia Flyers (1970–71)	12–23–8
44	W	January 21, 1971	4–2	Pittsburgh Penguins (1970–71)	13–23–8
45	W	January 23, 1971	3–2	Toronto Maple Leafs (1970–71)	14–23–8
46	T	January 27, 1971	3–3	Buffalo Sabres (1970–71)	14–23–9
47	T	January 30, 1971	3–3	@ Detroit Red Wings (1970–71)	14–23–10
48	T	January 31, 1971	2–2	@ New York Rangers (1970–71)	14–23–11

February

Game	Result	Date	Score	Opponent	Record
49	L	February 3, 1971	3–7	@ Boston Bruins (1970–71)	14–24–11
50	L	February 4, 1971	2–5	@ Buffalo Sabres (1970–71)	14–25–11
51	W	February 6, 1971	6–3	Montreal Canadiens (1970–71)	15–25–11
52	W	February 10, 1971	5–2	Detroit Red Wings (1970–71)	16–25–11
53	L	February 13, 1971	1–8	@ Toronto Maple Leafs (1970–71)	16–26–11
54	L	February 14, 1971	0–4	@ Detroit Red Wings (1970–71)	16–27–11
55	L	February 17, 1971	0–4	Philadelphia Flyers (1970–71)	16–28–11
56	W	February 20, 1971	5–4	Boston Bruins (1970–71)	17–28–11
57	L	February 21, 1971	5–7	@ Chicago Black Hawks (1970–71)	17–29–11
58	L	February 24, 1971	1–5	@ Minnesota North Stars (1970–71)	17–30–11
59	L	February 25, 1971	3–5	Montreal Canadiens (1970–71)	17–31–11
60	L	February 27, 1971	1–4	Chicago Black Hawks (1970–71)	17–32–11
61	W	February 28, 1971	8–3	@ California Golden Seals (1970–71)	18–32–11

March

Game	Result	Date	Score	Opponent	Record
62	T	March 3, 1971	3–3	Buffalo Sabres (1970–71)	18–32–12
63	L	March 6, 1971	2–8	@ Montreal Canadiens (1970–71)	18–33–12
64	L	March 7, 1971	2–4	@ New York Rangers (1970–71)	18–34–12
65	W	March 9, 1971	4–0	@ St. Louis Blues (1970–71)	19–34–12
66	L	March 11, 1971	2–7	Boston Bruins (1970–71)	19–35–12
67	W	March 13, 1971	5–2	Detroit Red Wings (1970–71)	20–35–12
68	L	March 16, 1971	2–7	Minnesota North Stars (1970–71)	20–36–12
69	W	March 18, 1971	3–2	Chicago Black Hawks (1970–71)	21–36–12
70	W	March 20, 1971	8–4	Pittsburgh Penguins (1970–71)	22–36–12
71	L	March 21, 1971	2–5	@ California Golden Seals (1970–71)	22–37–12
72	L	March 23, 1971	1–3	@ Minnesota North Stars (1970–71)	22–38–12
73	W	March 25, 1971	5–3	Toronto Maple Leafs (1970–71)	23–38–12
74	L	March 27, 1971	3–6	St. Louis Blues (1970–71)	23–39–12
75	L	March 30, 1971	3–4	@ St. Louis Blues (1970–71)	23–40–12
76	T	March 31, 1971	2–2	Vancouver Canucks (1970–71)	23–40–13

April

Game	Result	Date	Score	Opponent	Record
77	W	April 3, 1971	6–4	California Golden Seals (1970–71)	24–40–13
78	W	April 4, 1971	4–2	@ Vancouver Canucks (1970–71)	25–40–13

Legend: Win (2 points) Loss (0 points) Tie (1 point)

== Player statistics ==
Regular season
Scoring

Player	Pos	GP	G	A	Pts	PIM	+/-	PPG	SHG	GWG
Juha Widing	C	78	25	40	65	24	−11	5	0	4
Bob Berry	LW	77	25	38	63	52	−5	4	0	2
Ross Lonsberry	LW	76	25	28	53	80	−35	5	2	0
Mike Byers	RW	72	27	18	45	14	−5	4	0	5
Bob Pulford	LW	59	17	26	43	53	−15	6	1	2
Eddie Joyal	C	69	20	21	41	14	−10	3	0	1
Bill Flett	RW	64	13	24	37	57	−30	5	0	0
Gilles Marotte	D	78	6	27	33	96	−9	0	0	0
Doug Robinson	LW	61	15	13	28	8	−8	3	0	3
Ralph Backstrom	C	33	14	13	27	8	−7	2	1	1
Gord Labossiere	C	45	11	10	21	16	−22	1	0	0
Noel Price	D	62	1	19	20	29	−15	0	0	0
Matt Ravlich	D	66	3	16	19	41	−14	0	0	1
Larry Mickey	RW	65	6	12	18	46	−15	0	1	2
Lucien Grenier	RW	68	9	7	16	12	−1	1	1	1
Dale Hoganson	D	70	4	10	14	52	−16	0	0	0
Larry Cahan	D	67	3	11	14	45	−29	1	0	0
Paul Curtis	D	64	1	13	14	82	−18	0	0	0
Harry Howell	D	18	3	8	11	4	1	1	0	0
Real Lemieux	LW	43	3	6	9	22	−7	0	0	1
Butch Goring	C	19	2	5	7	2	4	0	0	0
Eddie Shack	LW	11	2	2	4	8	−3	0	0	1
Jean Potvin	D	4	1	3	4	2	5	0	0	0
Al McDonough	RW	6	2	1	3	0	2	0	0	1
Dick Duff	LW	7	1	0	1	0	−2	0	0	0
Denis DeJordy	G	60	0	0	0	0	0	0	0	0
Jack Norris	G	25	0	0	0	0	0	0	0	0
Jim Stanfield	C/RW	2	0	0	0	0	1	0	0	0

Goaltending

Player	MIN	GP	W	L	T	GA	GAA	SO
Denis DeJordy	3375	60	18	29	11	214	3.80	1
Jack Norris	1305	25	7	11	2	85	3.91	0
Team:	4680	78	25	40	13	299	3.83	1

Note:

Pos = Position;GP = Games played; G = Goals; A = Assists; Pts = Points; PIM = Penalty minutes; +/- = Plus/minus; PPG = Power-play goals; SHG = Short-handed goals; GWG = Game-winning goals
Pos = Position;GP = Games played; Min, TOI = Minutes played; W = Wins; L = Losses; T,T/OT = Ties; OTL = Overtime losses; GA = Goals-against; GAA = Goals-against average; SO = Shutouts; SA = Shots against; SV = Shots saved;SV% = Save percentage;

== Transactions ==
The Kings were involved in the following transactions during the 1970–71 season.

=== Trades ===
May 11, 1970	To Los Angeles Kings Ray Fortin	To St. Louis Blues Bob Wall
May 20, 1970	To Los Angeles Kings Mike Byers	To Philadelphia Flyers Brent Hughes
May 22, 1970	To Los Angeles Kings Larry Mickey; Lucien Grenier; Jack Norris	To Montreal Canadiens Gregg Boddy; Leon Rochefort; Wayne Thomas
September 3, 1970	To Los Angeles Kings Bob Pulford	To Toronto Maple Leafs Garry Monahan; Brian Murphy
October 8, 1970	To Los Angeles Kings Bob Berry	To Montreal Canadiens Cash
November 1, 1970	To Los Angeles Kings Cash	To Denver Spurs (WHL) Loan of Howie Hughes
November 24, 1970	To Los Angeles Kings Mike McMahon Jr. 7th round pick in 1971 – Pete Harasym; 8th round pick in 1971 – Lorne Stamler	To Buffalo Sabres Dick Duff; Eddie Shack
December 1, 1970	To Los Angeles Kings Ed Hoekstra	To Denver Spurs (WHL Jimmy Peters Jr.
January 26, 1971	To Los Angeles Kings Ralph Backstrom	To Montreal Canadiens Gord Labossiere; Ray Fortin; 2nd round pick in 1973 – Peter Marrin
February 1, 1971	To Los Angeles Kings Red Armstrong	To Toronto Maple Leafs Don Westbrooke
February 5, 1971	To Los Angeles Kings Harry Howell	To California Golden Seals 8th round pick in 1971 – Rod Lyons; Cash
March 3, 1971	To Los Angeles Kings Wayne Schultz; Steve Sutherland	To Minnesota North Stars Terry Holbrook

=== Free agent signings ===
May 22, 1970	From Omaha Knights (CHL) Gord Smith
September 1, 1970	From Winnipeg Jets (WHL) Bill Mikkelson

=== Intra-league Draft ===
June 9, 1970	From Montreal Canadiens Paul Curtis
June 9, 1970	To Montreal Canadiens Bill Inglis
June 9, 1970	To Pittsburgh Penguins Lowell MacDonald
June 9, 1970	From Pittsburgh Penguins Craig Cameron

=== Reverse Draft ===
June 9, 1970	To Baltimore Clippers (AHL) Marc Dufour
June 9, 1970	To Oakland Seals Bob Sneddon
June 10, 1970	From Minnesota North Stars Gary Dineen

=== Expansion Draft ===
June 10, 1970	To Buffalo Sabres Craig Cameron; Skip Krake
June 10, 1970	To Vancouver Canucks Mike Corrigan

== Draft picks ==
Los Angeles's draft picks at the 1970 NHL amateur draft held at the Queen Elizabeth Hotel in Montreal.

Round	#	Player	Nationality	College/Junior/Club team (League)
2	24	Al McDonough	Canada	St. Catharines Black Hawks (OHA)
3	38	Terry Holbrook	Canada	London Knights (OHA)
5	59	Billy Smith	Canada	Cornwall Royals (QMJHL)
6	73	Gerry Bradbury	Canada	London Knights (OHA)
7	86	Brian Carlin	Canada	Calgary Centennials (WCHL)
8	98	Brian Chinnick	Canada	Peterborough Petes (OHA)

== See also ==
- 1970–71 NHL season
