= 1970–71 Toronto Maple Leafs season =

NHL hockey team season

1970–71 Toronto Maple Leafs
- Division: 4th East
- 1970–71 record: 37–33–8
- Home record: 24–9–6
- Road record: 13–24–2
- Goals for: 248
- Goals against: 211

Team information
- General manager: Jim Gregory
- Coach: John McLellan
- Captain: Dave Keon
- Alternate captains: Ron Ellis; Norm Ullman; Mike Walton
- Arena: Maple Leaf Gardens

Team leaders
- Goals: Dave Keon (38)
- Assists: Norm Ullman (51)
- Points: Norm Ullman (85)
- Penalty minutes: Jim Dorey (198)
- Wins: Jacques Plante (24)
- Goals against average: Jacques Plante (1.88)

The 1970–71 Toronto Maple Leafs season was the 54th season of the franchise, 44th as the Maple Leafs. The Leafs placed fourth in the East to qualify for the playoffs, after missing the prior year. The Leafs lost to the New York Rangers in the first round of the playoffs. Norm Ullman ranked sixth in the league in the scoring with 85 points.

== Offseason ==
=== NHL draft ===
= NHL All-Star	= Hall of Famer

Round	Pick	Player	Nationality	College/Junior/Club team
1	8	Darryl Sittler	Canada	London Knights (OHA)
2	22	Errol Thompson	Canada	Charlottetown Royals (NBSHL)
3	36	Gerry O'Flaherty	Canada	Kitchener Rangers (OHA)
4	50	Bob Gryp	Canada	Boston University (ECAC)
5	64	Luc Simard	Canada	Trois-Rivières Draveurs (QMJHL)
6	78	Cal Booth	Canada	Weyburn Red Wings (SJHL)
7	91	Paul Larose	Canada	Quebec Remparts (QMJHL)
8	103	Ron Low	Canada	Dauphin Kings (MJHL)

== Regular season ==
In February, the Maple Leafs and Philadelphia Flyers swung a large trade. Toronto picked up Bernie Parent and a second-round draft choice for Bruce Gamble, Mike Walton and a first-round draft choice.

=== Season standings ===
East Division
		GP	W	L	T	GF	GA	DIFF	Pts
1	Boston Bruins	78	57	14	7	399	207	+192	121
2	New York Rangers	78	49	18	11	259	177	+82	109
3	Montreal Canadiens	78	42	23	13	291	216	+75	97
4	Toronto Maple Leafs	78	37	33	8	248	211	+37	82
5	Buffalo Sabres	78	24	39	15	217	291	−74	63
6	Vancouver Canucks	78	24	46	8	229	296	−67	56
7	Detroit Red Wings	78	22	45	11	209	308	−99	55

=== Record vs. opponents ===
==== Vs. East Division ====
1970–71 NHL records
Team	BOS	BUF	DET	MTL	NYR	TOR	VAN	Total
Boston	—	4–1–1	5–1	5–1	2–2–2	5–1	5–1	26–7–3
Buffalo	1–4–1	—	3–3	0–3–3	0–4–2	1–5	3–3	8–22–6
Detroit	1–5	3–3	—	1–4–1	1–4–1	1–4–1	4–2	11–22–3
Montreal	1–5	3–0–3	4–1–1	—	3–3	2–4	4–0–2	17–13–6
New York	2–2–2	4–0–2	4–1–1	3–3	—	5–1	5–1	23–8–5
Toronto	1–5	5–1	4–1–1	4–2	1–5	—	3–3	18–17–1
Vancouver	1–5	3–3	2–4	0–4–2	1–5	3–3	—	10–24–2

==== Vs. West Division ====
1970–71 NHL records
Team	CAL	CHI	LAK	MIN	PHI	PIT	STL	Total
Boston	5–1	2–3–1	5–1	5–0–1	6–0	4–1–1	4–1–1	31–7–4
Buffalo	3–3	0–5–1	2–1–3	5–1	2–3–1	2–0–4	2–4	16–17–9
Detroit	4–2	0–6	1–2–3	2–3–1	3–2–1	1–3–2	0–5–1	11–23–8
Montreal	5–1	3–3	4–2	3–1–2	4–1–1	3–1–2	3–1–2	25–10–7
New York	3–2–1	3–3	4–0–2	6–0	2–3–1	5–0–1	3–2–1	26–6–10
Toronto	3–2–1	3–2–1	3–3	2–2–2	2–3–1	3–2–1	3–2–1	19–16–7
Vancouver	5–1	0–5–1	3–2–1	2–3–1	2–4	1–4–1	1–3–2	14–22–6

== Schedule and results ==
1970–71 regular season
October

Game	Result	Date	Score	Opponent	Record
1	L	October 11, 1970	3–5	@ Vancouver Canucks (1970–71)	0–1–0
2	W	October 14, 1970	7–3	St. Louis Blues (1970–71)	1–1–0
3	L	October 17, 1970	2–6	New York Rangers (1970–71)	1–2–0
4	L	October 18, 1970	2–4	@ Philadelphia Flyers (1970–71)	1–3–0
5	L	October 21, 1970	2–3	@ New York Rangers (1970–71)	1–4–0
6	L	October 24, 1970	0–1	Chicago Black Hawks (1970–71)	1–5–0
7	W	October 28, 1970	6–2	Montreal Canadiens (1970–71)	2–5–0
8	L	October 31, 1970	1–3	Minnesota North Stars (1970–71)	2–6–0

November

Game	Result	Date	Score	Opponent	Record
9	W	November 1, 1970	5–4	@ Detroit Red Wings (1970–71)	3–6–0
10	L	November 4, 1970	2–3	@ Los Angeles Kings (1970–71)	3–7–0
11	L	November 6, 1970	4–8	@ California Golden Seals (1970–71)	3–8–0
12	L	November 7, 1970	2–3	@ Vancouver Canucks (1970–71)	3–9–0
13	L	November 11, 1970	2–4	Vancouver Canucks (1970–71)	3–10–0
14	W	November 14, 1970	3–2	Boston Bruins (1970–71)	4–10–0
15	L	November 15, 1970	2–4	@ New York Rangers (1970–71)	4–11–0
16	L	November 18, 1970	2–7	Buffalo Sabres (1970–71)	4–12–0
17	L	November 19, 1970	1–5	@ Montreal Canadiens (1970–71)	4–13–0
18	W	November 21, 1970	5–3	California Golden Seals (1970–71)	5–13–0
19	T	November 24, 1970	4–4	Pittsburgh Penguins (1970–71)	5–13–1
20	L	November 26, 1970	0–1	@ St. Louis Blues (1970–71)	5–14–1
21	W	November 28, 1970	9–4	Detroit Red Wings (1970–71)	6–14–1
22	L	November 29, 1970	2–4	@ Boston Bruins (1970–71)	6–15–1

December

Game	Result	Date	Score	Opponent	Record
23	W	December 2, 1970	7–0	Los Angeles Kings (1970–71)	7–15–1
24	L	December 5, 1970	0–1	New York Rangers (1970–71)	7–16–1
25	L	December 6, 1970	2–6	@ Chicago Black Hawks (1970–71)	7–17–1
26	L	December 8, 1970	0–4	@ Pittsburgh Penguins (1970–71)	7–18–1
27	W	December 9, 1970	4–0	Montreal Canadiens (1970–71)	8–18–1
28	W	December 12, 1970	2–1	Chicago Black Hawks (1970–71)	9–18–1
29	W	December 13, 1970	4–0	@ Buffalo Sabres (1970–71)	10–18–1
30	W	December 16, 1970	4–2	@ Pittsburgh Penguins (1970–71)	11–18–1
31	W	December 19, 1970	2–0	Buffalo Sabres (1970–71)	12–18–1
32	W	December 20, 1970	4–2	@ Buffalo Sabres (1970–71)	13–18–1
33	W	December 23, 1970	7–2	Vancouver Canucks (1970–71)	14–18–1
34	L	December 25, 1970	3–6	@ Minnesota North Stars (1970–71)	14–19–1
35	W	December 26, 1970	9–1	Philadelphia Flyers (1970–71)	15–19–1
36	W	December 30, 1970	3–1	California Golden Seals (1970–71)	16–19–1

January

Game	Result	Date	Score	Opponent	Record
37	W	January 2, 1971	13–0	Detroit Red Wings (1970–71)	17–19–1
38	W	January 5, 1971	2–0	@ Minnesota North Stars (1970–71)	18–19–1
39	T	January 6, 1971	4–4	Minnesota North Stars (1970–71)	18–19–2
40	W	January 9, 1971	5–2	Pittsburgh Penguins (1970–71)	19–19–2
41	W	January 10, 1971	3–2	@ Detroit Red Wings (1970–71)	20–19–2
42	T	January 13, 1971	1–1	California Golden Seals (1970–71)	20–19–3
43	L	January 14, 1971	0–3	@ Philadelphia Flyers (1970–71)	20–20–3
44	W	January 16, 1971	8–1	Los Angeles Kings (1970–71)	21–20–3
45	L	January 17, 1971	1–9	@ Boston Bruins (1970–71)	21–21–3
46	W	January 20, 1971	5–1	@ Vancouver Canucks (1970–71)	22–21–3
47	L	January 22, 1971	2–5	@ California Golden Seals (1970–71)	22–22–3
48	L	January 23, 1971	2–3	@ Los Angeles Kings (1970–71)	22–23–3
49	L	January 27, 1971	1–3	@ Pittsburgh Penguins (1970–71)	22–24–3
50	W	January 30, 1971	5–4	@ Montreal Canadiens (1970–71)	23–24–3

February

Game	Result	Date	Score	Opponent	Record
51	W	February 3, 1971	6–2	St. Louis Blues (1970–71)	24–24–3
52	W	February 6, 1971	4–2	Philadelphia Flyers (1970–71)	25–24–3
53	W	February 7, 1971	4–3	@ Buffalo Sabres (1970–71)	26–24–3
54	T	February 9, 1971	3–3	@ St. Louis Blues (1970–71)	26–24–4
55	W	February 10, 1971	3–2	@ Chicago Black Hawks (1970–71)	27–24–4
56	W	February 13, 1971	8–1	Los Angeles Kings (1970–71)	28–24–4
57	L	February 14, 1971	1–5	Boston Bruins (1970–71)	28–25–4
58	W	February 17, 1971	4–3	Pittsburgh Penguins (1970–71)	29–25–4
59	W	February 20, 1971	3–1	St. Louis Blues (1970–71)	30–25–4
60	W	February 21, 1971	4–1	@ Minnesota North Stars (1970–71)	31–25–4
61	T	February 25, 1971	1–1	Minnesota North Stars (1970–71)	31–25–5
62	W	February 27, 1971	2–0	Buffalo Sabres (1970–71)	32–25–5
63	L	February 28, 1971	3–4	@ Boston Bruins (1970–71)	32–26–5

March

Game	Result	Date	Score	Opponent	Record
64	W	March 3, 1971	3–1	Vancouver Canucks (1970–71)	33–26–5
65	L	March 5, 1971	1–3	@ St. Louis Blues (1970–71)	33–27–5
66	T	March 6, 1971	2–2	Chicago Black Hawks (1970–71)	33–27–6
67	W	March 10, 1971	2–1	Montreal Canadiens (1970–71)	34–27–6
68	L	March 13, 1971	2–3	Philadelphia Flyers (1970–71)	34–28–6
69	L	March 14, 1971	0–1	@ New York Rangers (1970–71)	34–29–6
70	L	March 18, 1971	1–4	@ Montreal Canadiens (1970–71)	34–30–6
71	W	March 20, 1971	3–1	New York Rangers (1970–71)	35–30–6
72	T	March 21, 1971	1–1	@ Philadelphia Flyers (1970–71)	35–30–7
73	W	March 24, 1971	6–0	@ California Golden Seals (1970–71)	36–30–7
74	L	March 25, 1971	3–5	@ Los Angeles Kings (1970–71)	36–31–7
75	L	March 28, 1971	1–2	@ Detroit Red Wings (1970–71)	36–32–7
76	T	March 31, 1971	2–2	Detroit Red Wings (1970–71)	36–32–8

April

Game	Result	Date	Score	Opponent	Record
77	L	April 3, 1971	3–8	Boston Bruins (1970–71)	36–33–8
78	W	April 4, 1971	3–2	@ Chicago Black Hawks (1970–71)	37–33–8

Legend: Win (2 points) Loss (0 points) Tie (1 point)

== Player statistics ==
=== Regular season ===
Scoring

Player	GP	G	A	Pts	PIM
Norm Ullman	73	34	51	85	24
Dave Keon	76	38	38	76	4
Paul Henderson	72	30	30	60	34
Ron Ellis	78	24	29	53	10
Billy MacMillan	76	22	19	41	42
Garry Monahan	78	15	22	37	79
Jim Harrison	78	13	20	33	108
Jim McKenny	68	4	26	30	42
Jim Dorey	74	7	22	29	198
Mike Pelyk	73	5	21	26	54
George Armstrong	59	7	18	25	6
Guy Trottier	61	19	5	24	21
Brian Spencer	50	9	15	24	115
Rick Ley	76	4	16	20	151
Darryl Sittler	49	10	8	18	37
Bob Baun	58	1	17	18	123
Mike Walton	23	3	10	13	21
Brad Selwood	28	2	10	12	13
Brian Glennie	54	0	8	8	31
Denis Dupere	20	1	2	3	4
Bob Liddington	11	0	1	1	2
Brit Selby	11	0	1	1	6
Doug Brindley	3	0	0	0	0
Bruce Gamble	23	0	0	0	0
Brian Marchinko	2	0	0	0	0
Murray McLachlan	2	0	0	0	0
Ken Murray	4	0	0	0	0
Bernie Parent	18	0	0	0	0
Jacques Plante	40	0	0	0	2
Rene Robert	5	0	0	0	0
Johnny Bower	1	0	0	0	0
Errol Thompson	1	0	0	0	0

Goaltending

= Indicates league leader

Player	MIN	GP	W	L	T	GA	GAA	SA	SV	SV%	SO
Jacques Plante	2329	40	24	11	4	73	1.88				4
Bernie Parent	1040	18	7	7	3	46	2.65				0
Bruce Gamble	1226	23	6	13	1	83	3.87				2
Murray McLachlan	25	2	0	1	0	4	9.60				0
Johnny Bower	60	1	0	1	0	5	5.00				0
Team:	4680	78	37	33	8	206	2.64				6

=== Playoffs ===
Scoring

Player	GP	G	A	Pts	PIM
Paul Henderson	6	5	1	6	4
Dave Keon	6	3	2	5	0
Jim McKenny	6	2	1	3	2
Darryl Sittler	6	2	1	3	31
Billy MacMillan	6	0	3	3	2
Garry Monahan	6	2	0	2	2
Ron Ellis	6	1	1	2	2
George Armstrong	6	0	2	2	0
Rick Ley	6	0	2	2	4
Norm Ullman	6	0	2	2	2
Bob Baun	6	0	1	1	19
Jim Dorey	6	0	1	1	19
Jim Harrison	6	0	1	1	33
Brian Spencer	6	0	1	1	17
Denis Dupere	6	0	0	0	0
Brian Glennie	3	0	0	0	0
Bernie Parent	4	0	0	0	0
Mike Pelyk	6	0	0	0	10
Jacques Plante	3	0	0	0	0
Guy Trottier	5	0	0	0	0

Goaltending

Player	MIN	GP	W	L	T	GA	GAA	SA	SV	SV%	SO
Bernie Parent	235	4	2	2		9	2.30				0
Jacques Plante	134	3	0	2		7	3.13				0
Team:	369	6	2	4		16	2.60				0

== Playoffs ==
- The New York Rangers battled the Maple Leafs in the first round of the playoffs. The Rangers took the series 4 games to 2.

== Awards and records ==
- Dave Keon, Centre, NHL Second Team All-Star
- Dave Keon, Runner up, Lady Byng Memorial Trophy
- Jacques Plante, Goaltender, NHL Second Team All-Star

== Transactions ==
The Maple Leafs have been involved in the following transactions during the 1970–71 season.

=== Trades ===
August 1, 1970	To Vancouver Canucks Andre Hinse	To Toronto Maple Leafs Pat Hannigan; Ted McCaskill
August 31, 1970	To Buffalo Sabres Brent Imlach	To Toronto Maple Leafs Cash
September 1, 1970	To Vancouver Canucks Cash	To Toronto Maple Leafs Loan of Andre Hinse
September 2, 1970	To Buffalo Sabres Floyd Smith	To Toronto Maple Leafs Cash
September 3, 1970	To Los Angeles Kings Bob Pulford	To Toronto Maple Leafs Garry Monahan; Brian Murphy
November 13, 1970	To St. Louis Blues Brit Selby	To Toronto Maple Leafs Bob Baun
December 23, 1970	To Montreal Canadiens Terry Clancy	To Toronto Maple Leafs Cash
January 31, 1971	To Philadelphia Flyers Mike Walton; Bruce Gamble; 1st round pick in 1971 – Pierre Plante	To Toronto Maple Leafs Bernie Parent; 2nd round pick in 1971 – Rick Kehoe
February 1, 1971	To Los Angeles Kings Norm Armstrong	To Toronto Maple Leafs Don Westbrooke
June 10, 1971	To Boston Bruins Cash	To Toronto Maple Leafs 7th round pick in 1971 – Steve Johnson

=== Intra-league draft ===
June 8, 1971	To Buffalo Sabres Rene Robert
June 8, 1971	To California Golden Seals Frank Hughes
June 8, 1971	To Buffalo Sabres Ken Murray
June 8, 1971	From Buffalo Sabres Don Marshall

=== Free agents ===
Player / Former team; Murray McLachlan / Undrafted Free Agent	Player / New team; Brian Murphy / Springfield Kings (AHL)
