= 1970–71 Detroit Red Wings season =

National Hockey League team season

1970–71 Detroit Red Wings
- Division: 7th East
- 1970–71 record: 22–45–11
- Home record: 17–15–7
- Road record: 5–30–4
- Goals for: 209
- Goals against: 308

Team information
- General manager: Sid Abel (Oct–Jan); Ned Harkness (Jan–Apr)
- Coach: Ned Harkness; Doug Barkley
- Captain: Alex Delvecchio
- Alternate captains: Gary Bergman; Red Berenson
- Arena: Olympia Stadium
- Minor league affiliate: Fort Worth Wings (CHL)

Team leaders
- Goals: Tom Webster (30)
- Assists: Tom Webster (37)
- Points: Tom Webster (67)
- Penalty minutes: Gary Bergman (149)
- Wins: Roy Edwards (11)
- Goals against average: Roy Edwards (3.39)

The 1970–71 Detroit Red Wings season was Gordie Howe's final season with the Red Wings. Ned Harkness was hired as coach in 1970 and was promoted to general manager midway through the season. His background was a successful college hockey coach. He tried to force his two-way style of play on a veteran Red Wings team resistant to change. Harkness also demanded short hair, no smoking, and put other rules in place regarding drinking and phone calls. The Red Wings finished in with a 22–45–11 record for 55 points for last place in the East Division and missing the playoffs for the first time since the 1968–69 season, making things even worse was that they finished behind the two expansion clubs that season, the Buffalo Sabres and the Vancouver Canucks.

== Offseason ==
The Fort Worth Wings of the Central Hockey League, coached by former Red Wings' defenceman Doug Barkley, continued to be operated as Detroit's top farm team during the 1969–70 season.

== Regular season ==
Red Wings general manager Sid Abel wanted to get rid of coach Ned Harkness and was overruled by team owner Bruce Norris. Once Harkness took over as general manager, he got rid of players he deemed a threat to him. On January 10, 1971, Doug Barkley was promoted to become head coach of the Red wings, and on January 13, 1971, Frank Mahovlich was traded to the Montreal Canadiens for Mickey Redmond, Guy Charron and Bill Collins. Mahovlich was reunited with his brother Pete, who had become a star player himself with the Canadiens. One of the few highlights of the season was the emergence of young rookie goaltender Jim Rutherford.

- On October 29, Gordie Howe became the first player to record 1,000 assists in a 5–3 win over Boston at the Detroit Olympia.
- The Wings suffered their worst defeat in franchise history January 2, when Toronto beat them 13–0.

=== Season standings ===
East Division
		GP	W	L	T	GF	GA	DIFF	Pts
1	Boston Bruins	78	57	14	7	399	207	+192	121
2	New York Rangers	78	49	18	11	259	177	+82	109
3	Montreal Canadiens	78	42	23	13	291	216	+75	97
4	Toronto Maple Leafs	78	37	33	8	248	211	+37	82
5	Buffalo Sabres	78	24	39	15	217	291	−74	63
6	Vancouver Canucks	78	24	46	8	229	296	−67	56
7	Detroit Red Wings	78	22	45	11	209	308	−99	55

=== Record vs. opponents ===
==== Vs. East Division ====
1970–71 NHL records
Team	BOS	BUF	DET	MTL	NYR	TOR	VAN	Total
Boston	—	4–1–1	5–1	5–1	2–2–2	5–1	5–1	26–7–3
Buffalo	1–4–1	—	3–3	0–3–3	0–4–2	1–5	3–3	8–22–6
Detroit	1–5	3–3	—	1–4–1	1–4–1	1–4–1	4–2	11–22–3
Montreal	1–5	3–0–3	4–1–1	—	3–3	2–4	4–0–2	17–13–6
New York	2–2–2	4–0–2	4–1–1	3–3	—	5–1	5–1	23–8–5
Toronto	1–5	5–1	4–1–1	4–2	1–5	—	3–3	18–17–1
Vancouver	1–5	3–3	2–4	0–4–2	1–5	3–3	—	10–24–2

==== Vs. West Division ====
1970–71 NHL records
Team	CAL	CHI	LAK	MIN	PHI	PIT	STL	Total
Boston	5–1	2–3–1	5–1	5–0–1	6–0	4–1–1	4–1–1	31–7–4
Buffalo	3–3	0–5–1	2–1–3	5–1	2–3–1	2–0–4	2–4	16–17–9
Detroit	4–2	0–6	1–2–3	2–3–1	3–2–1	1–3–2	0–5–1	11–23–8
Montreal	5–1	3–3	4–2	3–1–2	4–1–1	3–1–2	3–1–2	25–10–7
New York	3–2–1	3–3	4–0–2	6–0	2–3–1	5–0–1	3–2–1	26–6–10
Toronto	3–2–1	3–2–1	3–3	2–2–2	2–3–1	3–2–1	3–2–1	19–16–7
Vancouver	5–1	0–5–1	3–2–1	2–3–1	2–4	1–4–1	1–3–2	14–22–6

== Schedule and results ==
1970–71 regular season
October

Game	Result	Date	Score	Opponent	Record
1	W	October 10, 1970	5–3	Bay Area Seals (1970–71)	1–0–0
2	L	October 11, 1970	3–7	@ Boston Bruins (1970–71)	1–1–0
3	L	October 13, 1970	3–4	@ Montreal Canadiens (1970–71)	1–2–0
4	L	October 15, 1970	1–2	Chicago Black Hawks (1970–71)	1–3–0
5	W	October 17, 1970	3–2	@ Minnesota North Stars (1970–71)	2–3–0
6	L	October 18, 1970	1–2	Minnesota North Stars (1970–71)	2–4–0
7	L	October 23, 1970	3–4	@ Buffalo Sabres (1970–71)	2–5–0
8	T	October 25, 1970	3–3	Montreal Canadiens (1970–71)	2–5–1
9	L	October 28, 1970	1–4	@ New York Rangers (1970–71)	2–6–1
10	W	October 29, 1970	5–3	Boston Bruins (1970–71)	3–6–1

November

Game	Result	Date	Score	Opponent	Record
11	L	November 1, 1970	4–5	Toronto Maple Leafs (1970–71)	3–7–1
12	L	November 4, 1970	2–4	@ Chicago Black Hawks (1970–71)	3–8–1
13	W	November 5, 1970	3–1	Philadelphia Flyers (1970–71)	4–8–1
14	T	November 8, 1970	3–3	Pittsburgh Penguins (1970–71)	4–8–2
15	L	November 12, 1970	1–2	@ St. Louis Blues (1970–71)	4–9–2
16	T	November 15, 1970	4–4	@ Los Angeles Kings (1970–71)	4–9–3
17	W	November 17, 1970	5–2	@ Vancouver Canucks (1970–71)	5–9–3
18	L	November 21, 1970	1–6	@ Pittsburgh Penguins (1970–71)	5–10–3
19	W	November 22, 1970	4–2	@ Philadelphia Flyers (1970–71)	6–10–3
20	W	November 26, 1970	4–2	Vancouver Canucks (1970–71)	7–10–3
21	L	November 28, 1970	4–9	@ Toronto Maple Leafs (1970–71)	7–11–3
22	W	November 29, 1970	5–3	Montreal Canadiens (1970–71)	8–11–3

December

Game	Result	Date	Score	Opponent	Record
23	T	December 3, 1970	4–4	Los Angeles Kings (1970–71)	8–11–4
24	L	December 5, 1970	0–3	@ St. Louis Blues (1970–71)	8–12–4
25	L	December 6, 1970	2–4	St. Louis Blues (1970–71)	8–13–4
26	W	December 10, 1970	3–1	Philadelphia Flyers (1970–71)	9–13–4
27	W	December 12, 1970	5–3	Buffalo Sabres (1970–71)	10–13–4
28	L	December 13, 1970	2–6	@ Boston Bruins (1970–71)	10–14–4
29	L	December 16, 1970	2–4	@ California Golden Seals (1970–71)	10–15–4
30	L	December 19, 1970	1–9	@ Pittsburgh Penguins (1970–71)	10–16–4
31	L	December 20, 1970	3–7	California Golden Seals (1970–71)	10–17–4
32	L	December 23, 1970	1–2	Boston Bruins (1970–71)	10–18–4
33	W	December 26, 1970	7–4	New York Rangers (1970–71)	11–18–4
34	L	December 27, 1970	2–5	@ Buffalo Sabres (1970–71)	11–19–4
35	L	December 31, 1970	3–8	Chicago Black Hawks (1970–71)	11–20–4

January

Game	Result	Date	Score	Opponent	Record
36	L	January 2, 1971	0–13	@ Toronto Maple Leafs (1970–71)	11–21–4
37	W	January 3, 1971	3–2	California Golden Seals (1970–71)	12–21–4
38	L	January 7, 1971	4–7	@ Buffalo Sabres (1970–71)	12–22–4
39	W	January 9, 1971	3–2	Buffalo Sabres (1970–71)	13–22–4
40	L	January 10, 1971	2–3	Toronto Maple Leafs (1970–71)	13–23–4
41	T	January 14, 1971	2–2	Pittsburgh Penguins (1970–71)	13–23–5
42	L	January 16, 1971	2–4	Philadelphia Flyers (1970–71)	13–24–5
43	L	January 17, 1971	0–2	Minnesota North Stars (1970–71)	13–25–5
44	L	January 21, 1971	0–2	@ Chicago Black Hawks (1970–71)	13–26–5
45	L	January 23, 1971	2–6	@ Montreal Canadiens (1970–71)	13–27–5
46	W	January 24, 1971	7–3	Vancouver Canucks (1970–71)	14–27–5
47	T	January 28, 1971	1–1	St. Louis Blues (1970–71)	14–27–6
48	T	January 30, 1971	3–3	Los Angeles Kings (1970–71)	14–27–7
49	L	January 31, 1971	1–3	@ Philadelphia Flyers (1970–71)	14–28–7

February

Game	Result	Date	Score	Opponent	Record
50	T	February 3, 1971	4–4	@ Minnesota North Stars (1970–71)	14–28–8
51	L	February 4, 1971	0–1	New York Rangers (1970–71)	14–29–8
52	W	February 7, 1971	5–2	@ California Golden Seals (1970–71)	15–29–8
53	L	February 10, 1971	2–5	@ Los Angeles Kings (1970–71)	15–30–8
54	L	February 12, 1971	3–5	@ Vancouver Canucks (1970–71)	15–31–8
55	W	February 14, 1971	4–0	Los Angeles Kings (1970–71)	16–31–8
56	W	February 18, 1971	5–3	Minnesota North Stars (1970–71)	17–31–8
57	W	February 20, 1971	6–5	Buffalo Sabres (1970–71)	18–31–8
58	L	February 21, 1971	1–4	@ New York Rangers (1970–71)	18–32–8
59	L	February 25, 1971	1–3	St. Louis Blues (1970–71)	18–33–8
60	L	February 27, 1971	2–4	@ Minnesota North Stars (1970–71)	18–34–8
61	W	February 28, 1971	4–2	Pittsburgh Penguins (1970–71)	19–34–8

March

Game	Result	Date	Score	Opponent	Record
62	T	March 4, 1971	2–2	@ Philadelphia Flyers (1970–71)	19–34–9
63	T	March 6, 1971	2–2	New York Rangers (1970–71)	19–34–10
64	L	March 7, 1971	1–4	Montreal Canadiens (1970–71)	19–35–10
65	L	March 11, 1971	3–7	@ Vancouver Canucks (1970–71)	19–36–10
66	L	March 13, 1971	2–5	@ Los Angeles Kings (1970–71)	19–37–10
67	W	March 14, 1971	8–5	@ California Golden Seals (1970–71)	20–37–10
68	L	March 16, 1971	4–11	Boston Bruins (1970–71)	20–38–10
69	L	March 18, 1971	3–7	@ Boston Bruins (1970–71)	20–39–10
70	L	March 20, 1971	1–2	@ St. Louis Blues (1970–71)	20–40–10
71	L	March 21, 1971	0–2	@ Chicago Black Hawks (1970–71)	20–41–10
72	L	March 24, 1971	2–8	@ Pittsburgh Penguins (1970–71)	20–42–10
73	W	March 25, 1971	4–3	Vancouver Canucks (1970–71)	21–42–10
74	L	March 27, 1971	2–9	@ Montreal Canadiens (1970–71)	21–43–10
75	W	March 28, 1971	2–1	Toronto Maple Leafs (1970–71)	22–43–10
76	T	March 31, 1971	2–2	@ Toronto Maple Leafs (1970–71)	22–43–11

April

Game	Result	Date	Score	Opponent	Record
77	L	April 3, 1971	1–4	Chicago Black Hawks (1970–71)	22–44–11
78	L	April 4, 1971	0–6	@ New York Rangers (1970–71)	22–45–11

Legend: Win (2 points) Loss (0 points) Tie (1 point)

== Player statistics ==
=== Forwards ===
Note: GP = Games played; G = Goals; A = Assists; Pts = Points; PIM = Penalty minutes

Player	GP	G	A	Pts	PIM
Tom Webster	78	30	37	67	40
Alex Delvecchio	77	21	34	55	6
Gordie Howe	63	23	29	52	38
Frank Mahovlich	35	14	18	32	30
Nick Libett	78	16	13	29	25
Garry Unger	51	13	14	27	63
Bruce MacGregor	47	6	16	22	18
Wayne Connelly	51	8	13	21	12
Bill Collins	36	5	16	21	12
Red Berenson	24	5	12	17	4
Rene LeClerc	44	8	8	16	43
Mickey Redmond	21	6	8	14	7
Tim Ecclestone	27	4	10	14	13
Don Luce	58	3	11	14	18
Guy Charron	24	8	4	12	4

=== Defensemen ===
Note: GP = Games played; G = Goals; A = Assists; Pts = Points; PIM = Penalty minutes

Player	GP	G	A	Pts	PIM
Gary Bergman	68	8	25	33	149
Mike Robitaille	23	4	8	12	22
Dale Rolfe	44	3	9	12	48
Ron Harris	42	2	8	10	65
Gerry Hart	64	2	7	9	148
Arnie Brown					

=== Goaltending ===
Note: GP = Games played; W = Wins; L = Losses; T = Ties; SO = Shutouts; GA = Goals against; GAA = Goals against average

Player	GP	MIN	W	L	T	SO	GA	GAA
Roy Edwards	37	2104	11	19	7	0	119	3.39
Gerry Gray	7	380	1	4	1	0	30	4.74
Don McLeod	14	698	3	7	0	0	60	5.16
Jim Rutherford	29	1948	7	15	3	1	94	3.77

== Draft picks ==
Detroit's draft picks at the 1970 NHL amateur draft held at the Queen Elizabeth Hotel in Montreal.

Round	#	Player	Nationality	College/Junior/Club team (League)
1	12	Serge Lajeunesse	Canada	Montreal Junior Canadiens (OHA)
2	26	Robert Guindon	Canada	Montreal Junior Canadiens (OHA)
3	40	Yvon Lambert	Canada	Drummondville Rangers (QMJHL)
4	54	Tom Johnston	Canada	Toronto Marlboros (OHA)
5	68	Tom Mellor	United States	Boston College (ECAC)
6	82	Bernie MacNeil	Canada	Espanola Eagles (NOJHL)
7	95	Ed Hays	Canada	University of Denver (WCHA)
