= 1970–71 Boston Bruins season =

NHL team season

1970–71 Boston Bruins
- East Division champions
- Division: 1st East
- 1970–71 record: 57–14–7
- Home record: 33–4–2
- Road record: 24–10–5
- Goals for: 399
- Goals against: 207

Team information
- General manager: Milt Schmidt
- Coach: Tom Johnson
- Captain: Vacant
- Alternate captains: Johnny Bucyk; Phil Esposito; Ted Green; Ed Westfall
- Arena: Boston Garden

Team leaders
- Goals: Phil Esposito (76)
- Assists: Bobby Orr (102)
- Points: Phil Esposito (152)
- Penalty minutes: Don Awrey (141)
- Wins: Eddie Johnston (30)
- Goals against average: Eddie Johnston (2.52)

The 1970–71 Boston Bruins season was the Bruins' 47th season in the NHL. As defending champions, Boston set many NHL records. They earned 57 wins and 121 points, surpassing the previous records set by the 1968–69 Montreal Canadiens. They also scored 399 goals to shatter their own record set in 1968–69, and their goal differential of +192 surpassed the previous record set by the 1943–44 Montreal Canadiens as well. The NHL's top four scorers (Phil Esposito, Bobby Orr, Johnny Bucyk, and Ken Hodge), each with over 100 points, were all Bruins; previously, there had only been four players in the history of the NHL with 100-point seasons, and no other NHL franchise has ever produced the top four scorers in a season (the Bruins replicated the feat in 1973–74). With 76 goals and 152 points, Esposito broke Bobby Hull's single season record for goals, as well as his own single season points record, both set in 1968–69. Finally, with 102 assists, Orr broke the single season record for most assists that he set the previous year.

However, the team's unprecedented offence was shut down by rookie goaltender Ken Dryden, who guided the Montreal Canadiens to a seven-game upset against the Bruins in the first round of the playoffs.

All of the Bruins' aforementioned records have since been broken:

- The Montreal Canadiens earned 58 wins and 127 points in 1975–76. The Bruins reclaimed the record in 2023 with 65 wins and 135 points, beating the aforementioned Canadiens in 2022-23
- Montreal earned a goal differential of +216 in 1976–77.
- Wayne Gretzky scored 109 assists and 164 points in 1980–81.
- Gretzky scored 92 goals while the Edmonton Oilers scored 417 total goals in 1981–82.

== Offseason ==
- Bobby Orr signed the NHL's first one million dollar contract (to be paid out over five years).

=== NHL draft ===
Round	Overall	Player
1	3	Reggie Leach
1	4	Rick MacLeish
1	9	Ron Plumb
1	13	Bob Stewart
2	27	Dan Bouchard
3	41	Ray Brownlee
4	55	Gord Davies
5	69	Bob Roselle
6	83	Murray Wing
7	96	Glenn Siddall

== Regular season ==
The 1970–71 Bruins set an NHL record by having 10 different skaters score 20 goals or more in a season. The record was broken by the 1977–78 Bruins when they had 11 different skaters with 20 goals or more.

=== Playoffs ===
The postseason ended quickly for the Bruins as they lost in the opening round to the Montreal Canadiens and their rookie goaltender Ken Dryden in a seven-game upset.

=== Season standings ===
East Division
		GP	W	L	T	GF	GA	DIFF	Pts
1	Boston Bruins	78	57	14	7	399	207	+192	121
2	New York Rangers	78	49	18	11	259	177	+82	109
3	Montreal Canadiens	78	42	23	13	291	216	+75	97
4	Toronto Maple Leafs	78	37	33	8	248	211	+37	82
5	Buffalo Sabres	78	24	39	15	217	291	−74	63
6	Vancouver Canucks	78	24	46	8	229	296	−67	56
7	Detroit Red Wings	78	22	45	11	209	308	−99	55

=== Record vs. opponents ===
==== Vs. East Division ====
1970–71 NHL records
Team	BOS	BUF	DET	MTL	NYR	TOR	VAN	Total
Boston	—	4–1–1	5–1	5–1	2–2–2	5–1	5–1	26–7–3
Buffalo	1–4–1	—	3–3	0–3–3	0–4–2	1–5	3–3	8–22–6
Detroit	1–5	3–3	—	1–4–1	1–4–1	1–4–1	4–2	11–22–3
Montreal	1–5	3–0–3	4–1–1	—	3–3	2–4	4–0–2	17–13–6
New York	2–2–2	4–0–2	4–1–1	3–3	—	5–1	5–1	23–8–5
Toronto	1–5	5–1	4–1–1	4–2	1–5	—	3–3	18–17–1
Vancouver	1–5	3–3	2–4	0–4–2	1–5	3–3	—	10–24–2

==== Vs. West Division ====
1970–71 NHL records
Team	CAL	CHI	LAK	MIN	PHI	PIT	STL	Total
Boston	5–1	2–3–1	5–1	5–0–1	6–0	4–1–1	4–1–1	31–7–4
Buffalo	3–3	0–5–1	2–1–3	5–1	2–3–1	2–0–4	2–4	16–17–9
Detroit	4–2	0–6	1–2–3	2–3–1	3–2–1	1–3–2	0–5–1	11–23–8
Montreal	5–1	3–3	4–2	3–1–2	4–1–1	3–1–2	3–1–2	25–10–7
New York	3–2–1	3–3	4–0–2	6–0	2–3–1	5–0–1	3–2–1	26–6–10
Toronto	3–2–1	3–2–1	3–3	2–2–2	2–3–1	3–2–1	3–2–1	19–16–7
Vancouver	5–1	0–5–1	3–2–1	2–3–1	2–4	1–4–1	1–3–2	14–22–6

== Schedule and results ==
1970–71 regular season
October

Game	Result	Date	Score	Opponent	Record
1	W	October 11, 1970	7–3	Detroit Red Wings (1970–71)	1–0–0
2	W	October 14, 1970	8–5	@ Los Angeles Kings (1970–71)	2–0–0
3	W	October 16, 1970	5–1	@ California Golden Seals (1970–71)	3–0–0
4	W	October 18, 1970	5–3	@ Vancouver Canucks (1970–71)	4–0–0
5	T	October 22, 1970	3–3	Chicago Black Hawks (1970–71)	4–0–1
6	W	October 25, 1970	4–3	Philadelphia Flyers (1970–71)	5–0–1
7	L	October 29, 1970	3–5	@ Detroit Red Wings (1970–71)	5–1–1
8	W	October 31, 1970	6–0	New York Rangers (1970–71)	6–1–1

November

Game	Result	Date	Score	Opponent	Record
9	W	November 1, 1970	5–0	Minnesota North Stars (1970–71)	7–1–1
10	L	November 5, 1970	0–2	St. Louis Blues (1970–71)	7–2–1
11	T	November 7, 1970	2–2	@ Pittsburgh Penguins (1970–71)	7–2–2
12	W	November 8, 1970	6–1	Montreal Canadiens (1970–71)	8–2–2
13	W	November 10, 1970	6–3	Vancouver Canucks (1970–71)	9–2–2
14	L	November 14, 1970	2–3	@ Toronto Maple Leafs (1970–71)	9–3–2
15	L	November 15, 1970	1–2	California Golden Seals (1970–71)	9–4–2
16	W	November 18, 1970	8–4	@ Minnesota North Stars (1970–71)	10–4–2
17	W	November 21, 1970	5–2	@ Philadelphia Flyers (1970–71)	11–4–2
18	W	November 22, 1970	4–2	Pittsburgh Penguins (1970–71)	12–4–2
19	T	November 24, 1970	5–5	@ St. Louis Blues (1970–71)	12–4–3
20	W	November 26, 1970	3–2	Chicago Black Hawks (1970–71)	13–4–3
21	T	November 28, 1970	3–3	@ New York Rangers (1970–71)	13–4–4
22	W	November 29, 1970	4–2	Toronto Maple Leafs (1970–71)	14–4–4

December

Game	Result	Date	Score	Opponent	Record
23	L	December 2, 1970	3–4	@ Chicago Black Hawks (1970–71)	14–5–4
24	T	December 3, 1970	4–4	@ Buffalo Sabres (1970–71)	14–5–5
25	W	December 5, 1970	4–2	@ Montreal Canadiens (1970–71)	15–5–5
26	W	December 6, 1970	6–3	Pittsburgh Penguins (1970–71)	16–5–5
27	W	December 10, 1970	8–2	Buffalo Sabres (1970–71)	17–5–5
28	W	December 12, 1970	1–0	@ Philadelphia Flyers (1970–71)	18–5–5
29	W	December 13, 1970	6–2	Detroit Red Wings (1970–71)	19–5–5
30	W	December 16, 1970	6–4	Los Angeles Kings (1970–71)	20–5–5
31	W	December 19, 1970	7–1	@ St. Louis Blues (1970–71)	21–5–5
32	W	December 20, 1970	7–2	Minnesota North Stars (1970–71)	22–5–5
33	W	December 23, 1970	2–1	@ Detroit Red Wings (1970–71)	23–5–5
34	W	December 25, 1970	8–4	Pittsburgh Penguins (1970–71)	24–5–5
35	L	December 26, 1970	2–4	@ Pittsburgh Penguins (1970–71)	24–6–5
36	W	December 30, 1970	6–2	@ Minnesota North Stars (1970–71)	25–6–5

January

Game	Result	Date	Score	Opponent	Record
37	W	January 1, 1971	9–4	@ Buffalo Sabres (1970–71)	26–6–5
38	W	January 3, 1971	5–1	@ Philadelphia Flyers (1970–71)	27–6–5
39	W	January 7, 1971	6–4	Vancouver Canucks (1970–71)	28–6–5
40	L	January 9, 1971	3–4	@ Chicago Black Hawks (1970–71)	28–7–5
41	W	January 10, 1971	7–4	California Golden Seals (1970–71)	29–7–5
42	W	January 14, 1971	9–5	Los Angeles Kings (1970–71)	30–7–5
43	L	January 16, 1971	2–4	@ Montreal Canadiens (1970–71)	30–8–5
44	W	January 17, 1971	9–1	Toronto Maple Leafs (1970–71)	31–8–5
45	W	January 23, 1971	6–2	Chicago Black Hawks (1970–71)	32–8–5
46	W	January 24, 1971	4–2	Montreal Canadiens (1970–71)	33–8–5
47	T	January 27, 1971	2–2	@ New York Rangers (1970–71)	33–8–6
48	W	January 28, 1971	6–2	Philadelphia Flyers (1970–71)	34–8–6
49	W	January 31, 1971	6–0	St. Louis Blues (1970–71)	35–8–6

February

Game	Result	Date	Score	Opponent	Record
50	W	February 3, 1971	7–3	Los Angeles Kings (1970–71)	36–8–6
51	W	February 6, 1971	4–3	Buffalo Sabres (1970–71)	37–8–6
52	T	February 7, 1971	4–4	Minnesota North Stars (1970–71)	37–8–7
53	W	February 9, 1971	6–3	New York Rangers (1970–71)	38–8–7
54	W	February 11, 1971	5–3	@ St. Louis Blues (1970–71)	39–8–7
55	W	February 14, 1971	5–1	@ Toronto Maple Leafs (1970–71)	40–8–7
56	L	February 16, 1971	4–5	@ Vancouver Canucks (1970–71)	40–9–7
57	W	February 19, 1971	5–0	@ California Golden Seals (1970–71)	41–9–7
58	L	February 20, 1971	4–5	@ Los Angeles Kings (1970–71)	41–10–7
59	W	February 23, 1971	6–3	@ Buffalo Sabres (1970–71)	42–10–7
60	W	February 25, 1971	8–3	Vancouver Canucks (1970–71)	43–10–7
61	W	February 28, 1971	4–3	Toronto Maple Leafs (1970–71)	44–10–7

March

Game	Result	Date	Score	Opponent	Record
62	W	March 2, 1971	6–0	@ Minnesota North Stars (1970–71)	45–10–7
63	W	March 4, 1971	7–0	California Golden Seals (1970–71)	46–10–7
64	W	March 6, 1971	6–3	@ Pittsburgh Penguins (1970–71)	47–10–7
65	W	March 7, 1971	4–1	St. Louis Blues (1970–71)	48–10–7
66	W	March 10, 1971	8–1	@ California Golden Seals (1970–71)	49–10–7
67	W	March 11, 1971	7–2	@ Los Angeles Kings (1970–71)	50–10–7
68	W	March 13, 1971	6–3	@ Vancouver Canucks (1970–71)	51–10–7
69	W	March 16, 1971	11–4	@ Detroit Red Wings (1970–71)	52–10–7
70	W	March 18, 1971	7–3	Detroit Red Wings (1970–71)	53–10–7
71	W	March 20, 1971	5–3	Philadelphia Flyers (1970–71)	54–10–7
72	L	March 21, 1971	5–7	Buffalo Sabres (1970–71)	54–11–7
73	L	March 24, 1971	1–2	@ Chicago Black Hawks (1970–71)	54–12–7
74	L	March 27, 1971	3–6	New York Rangers (1970–71)	54–13–7
75	L	March 28, 1971	1–2	@ New York Rangers (1970–71)	54–14–7
76	W	March 31, 1971	6–3	@ Montreal Canadiens (1970–71)	55–14–7

April

Game	Result	Date	Score	Opponent	Record
77	W	April 3, 1971	8–3	@ Toronto Maple Leafs (1970–71)	56–14–7
78	W	April 4, 1971	7–2	Montreal Canadiens (1970–71)	57–14–7

Legend: Win (2 points) Loss (0 points) Tie (1 point)

== Playoffs ==
=== Quarterfinals: (E1) Boston Bruins vs. (E3) Montreal Canadiens ===
April 7	Boston Bruins	3–1	Montreal Canadiens	Boston Garden

April 8	Boston Bruins	5–7	Montreal Canadiens	Boston Garden

April 10	Montreal Canadiens	3–1	Boston Bruins	Montreal Forum

April 11	Montreal Canadiens	2–5	Boston Bruins	Montreal Forum

April 13	Boston Bruins	7–3	Montreal Canadiens	Boston Garden

April 15	Montreal Canadiens	8–3	Boston Bruins	Montreal Forum

April 18	Boston Bruins	2–4	Montreal Canadiens	Boston Garden

Montreal won series 4–3

== Player statistics ==
=== Regular season ===
= Indicates league leader

Scoring

Player	Pos	GP	G	A	Pts	PIM	+/-	PPG	SHG	GWG
Phil Esposito	C	78	76	76	152	71	71	25	1	16
Bobby Orr	D	78	37	102	139	91	124	5	3	5
John Bucyk	LW	78	51	65	116	8	36	22	0	5
Ken Hodge	RW	78	43	62	105	113	71	4	0	7
Wayne Cashman	LW	77	21	58	79	100	59	4	0	3
John McKenzie	RW	65	31	46	77	120	27	11	0	3
Fred Stanfield	LW	75	24	52	76	12	32	8	0	3
Derek Sanderson	C	71	29	34	63	130	39	1	6	0
Ed Westfall	D/RW	78	25	34	59	48	58	0	7	5
Wayne Carleton	LW	69	22	24	46	44	35	0	0	5
Dallas Smith	D	73	7	38	45	68	94	0	2	1
Ted Green	D	78	5	37	42	60	37	0	0	0
Don Marcotte	LW	75	15	13	28	30	20	0	6	2
Don Awrey	D	74	4	21	25	141	40	0	0	1
Rick Smith	D	67	4	19	23	44	30	0	0	1
Mike Walton	C	22	3	5	8	10	11	0	0	0
Reggie Leach	RW	23	2	4	6	0	7	0	0	0
Garnet Bailey	LW	36	0	6	6	44	4	0	0	0
Eddie Johnston	G	38	0	1	1	6	0	0	0	0
Ivan Boldirev	C	2	0	0	0	0	0	0	0	0
Gerry Cheevers	G	40	0	0	0	4	0	0	0	0
Danny Schock	LW	6	0	0	0	0	−1	0	0	0
Bill Speer	D	1	0	0	0	4	0	0	0	0

Goaltending

Player	MIN	GP	W	L	T	GA	GAA	SO
Eddie Johnston	2280	38	30	6	2	96	2.53	4
Gerry Cheevers	2400	40	27	8	5	109	2.72	3
Team:	4680	78	57	14	7	205	2.63	7

=== Playoffs ===
Scoring

Player	Pos	GP	G	A	Pts	PIM	PPG	SHG	GWG
Bobby Orr	D	7	5	7	12	25	1	1	1
Phil Esposito	C	7	3	7	10	6	2	0	0
Fred Stanfield	LW	7	3	4	7	0	1	0	0
John Bucyk	LW	7	2	5	7	0	0	0	0
Ken Hodge	RW	7	2	5	7	6	0	0	0
Wayne Cashman	LW	7	3	2	5	15	0	0	1
John McKenzie	RW	7	2	3	5	22	1	0	1
Derek Sanderson	C	7	2	1	3	13	0	0	0
Ed Westfall	D/RW	7	1	2	3	2	0	1	0
Dallas Smith	D	7	0	3	3	26	0	0	0
Mike Walton	C	5	2	0	2	19	1	0	0
Ted Green	D	7	1	0	1	25	0	0	0
Don Awrey	D	7	0	0	0	17	0	0	0
Garnet Bailey	LW	1	0	0	0	10	0	0	0
Wayne Carleton	LW	4	0	0	0	0	0	0	0
Gerry Cheevers	G	6	0	0	0	4	0	0	0
Eddie Johnston	G	1	0	0	0	0	0	0	0
Reggie Leach	RW	3	0	0	0	0	0	0	0
Don Marcotte	LW	4	0	0	0	0	0	0	0
Rick Smith	D	6	0	0	0	0	0	0	0

Goaltending

Player	MIN	GP	W	L	GA	GAA	SO
Gerry Cheevers	360	6	3	3	21	3.50	0
Eddie Johnston	60	1	0	1	7	7.00	0
Team:	420	7	3	4	28	4.00	0

Note:

Pos = Position;GP = Games played; G = Goals; A = Assists; Pts = Points; PIM = Penalty minutes; +/- = Plus/minus; PPG = Power-play goals; SHG = Short-handed goals; GWG = Game-winning goals
Pos = Position;GP = Games played; Min, TOI = Minutes played; W = Wins; L = Losses; T,T/OT = Ties; OTL = Overtime losses; GA = Goals-against; GAA = Goals-against average; SO = Shutouts; SA = Shots against; SV = Shots saved;SV% = Save percentage;

== Awards and records ==
- Prince of Wales Trophy: || Boston Bruins
- Art Ross Trophy: || Phil Esposito
- Hart Memorial Trophy: || Bobby Orr
- James Norris Memorial Trophy: || Bobby Orr
- Lady Byng Memorial Trophy: || Johnny Bucyk
- Lester B. Pearson Award: || Phil Esposito
- NHL Plus/Minus Award: || Bobby Orr
- Johnny Bucyk, Left Wing, NHL First Team All-Star
- Phil Esposito, Center, NHL First Team All-Star
- Phil Esposito, Club Record, Most Points in a Season, 152
- Phil Esposito, NHL Record, Most Shots on Goal in One Season (550)
- Ken Hodge, Right Wing, NHL First Team All-Star
- Bobby Orr, Defence, NHL First Team All-Star
- Bobby Orr, Club Record, Most Assists in a Season, 102
- Bobby Orr, NHL Record, Most Assists by a Defenseman in One Season (102)
- Bobby Orr, NHL Record, Most Points by a Defenseman in One Season (139)
