= 1970–71 Minnesota North Stars season =

National Hockey League team season

1970–71 Minnesota North Stars
- Division: 4th West
- 1970–71 record: 28–34–16
- Home record: 16–15–8
- Road record: 12–19–8
- Goals for: 191
- Goals against: 223

Team information
- General manager: Wren Blair
- Coach: Jack Gordon
- Captain: Ted Harris
- Alternate captains: J. P. Parise; Barry Gibbs; Charlie Burns
- Arena: Met Center

Team leaders
- Goals: Bill Goldsworthy (34); Danny Grant (34)
- Assists: Jude Drouin(52)
- Points: Jude Drouin (68)
- Penalty minutes: Barry Gibbs (132)
- Wins: Cesare Maniago (19)
- Goals against average: Gump Worsley (2.50)

The 1970–71 Minnesota North Stars season was the North Stars' fourth season.

Coached by Jack Gordon, the team compiled a record of 28–34–16 for 72 points, to finish the regular season 4th in the West Division. In the playoffs they won the quarter-finals in a 4–2 upset over the St. Louis Blues, becoming the first expansion team to defeat the three-time Stanley Cup finalists in the playoffs. While the North Stars ultimately lost in the semi-finals 4–2 to the eventual champion Montreal Canadiens under the revised playoff format, they did become the first expansion team to win postseason games against an Original Six opponent.

== Regular season ==
=== Final standings ===
West Division
		GP	W	L	T	GF	GA	DIFF	Pts
1	Chicago Black Hawks	78	49	20	9	277	184	+93	107
2	St. Louis Blues	78	34	25	19	223	208	+15	87
3	Philadelphia Flyers	78	28	33	17	207	225	−18	73
4	Minnesota North Stars	78	28	34	16	191	223	−32	72
5	Los Angeles Kings	78	25	40	13	239	303	−64	63
6	Pittsburgh Penguins	78	21	37	20	221	240	−19	62
7	California Golden Seals	78	20	53	5	199	320	−121	45

=== Record vs. opponents ===
==== Vs. West Division ====
1970–71 NHL records
Team	CAL	CHI	LAK	MIN	PHI	PIT	STL	Total
California	—	1–5	1–5	2–4	2–3–1	1–4–1	1–4–1	8–25–3
Chicago	5–1	—	4–2	3–2–1	4–1–1	4–2	2–1–3	22–9–5
Los Angeles	5–1	2–4	—	0–5–1	1–2–3	4–2	2–4	14–18–4
Minnesota	4–2	2–3–1	5–0–1	—	1–2–3	3–1–2	3–1–2	18–9–9
Philadelphia	3–2–1	1–4–1	2–1–3	2–1–3	—	3–1–2	1–3–2	12–12–12
Pittsburgh	4–1–1	2–4	2–4	1–3–2	1–3–2	—	0–3–3	10–18–8
St. Louis	4–1–1	1–2–3	4–2	1–3–2	3–1–2	3–0–3	—	16–9–11

==== Vs. East Division ====
1970–71 NHL records
Team	BOS	BUF	DET	MTL	NYR	TOR	VAN	Total
California	1–5	3–3	2–4	1–5	2–3–1	2–3–1	1–5	12–28–2
Chicago	3–2–1	5–0–1	6–0	3–3	3–3	2–3–1	5–0–1	27–11–4
Los Angeles	1–5	1–2–3	2–1–3	2–4	0–4–2	3–3	2–3–1	11–22–9
Minnesota	0–5–1	1–5	3–2–1	1–3–2	0–6	2–2–2	3–2–1	10–25–7
Philadelphia	0–6	3–2–1	2–3–1	1–4–1	3–2–1	3–2–1	4–2	16–21–5
Pittsburgh	1–4–1	0–2–4	3–1–2	1–3–2	0–5–1	2–3–1	4–1–1	11–19–12
St. Louis	1–4–1	4–2	5–0–1	1–3–2	2–3–1	2–3–1	3–1–2	18–16–8

== Playoffs ==
=== Quarterfinals ===
For the third time in four seasons, the North Stars played the Blues. This time, the North Stars gained the upper hand and won over the Blues after winning three in a row.

=== Semifinals ===
This was the first series played between the Canadiens and the North Stars. Their win on April 24 was the first win by a member of the expansion squad against the original teams in the playoffs.

== Schedule and results ==
1970–71 regular season
October

Game	Result	Date	Score	Opponent	Record
1	L	October 10, 1970	1–2	@ Philadelphia Flyers (1970–71)	0–1–0
2	W	October 15, 1970	4–2	Pittsburgh Penguins (1970–71)	1–1–0
3	L	October 17, 1970	2–3	Detroit Red Wings (1970–71)	1–2–0
4	W	October 18, 1970	2–1	@ Detroit Red Wings (1970–71)	2–2–0
5	W	October 21, 1970	3–1	@ Montreal Canadiens (1970–71)	3–2–0
6	L	October 24, 1970	1–4	New York Rangers (1970–71)	3–3–0
7	W	October 28, 1970	2–1	Chicago Black Hawks (1970–71)	4–3–0
8	W	October 31, 1970	3–1	@ Toronto Maple Leafs (1970–71)	5–3–0

November

Game	Result	Date	Score	Opponent	Record
9	L	November 1, 1970	0–5	@ Boston Bruins (1970–71)	5–4–0
10	L	November 4, 1970	3–4	Montreal Canadiens (1970–71)	5–5–0
11	T	November 7, 1970	1–1	St. Louis Blues (1970–71)	5–5–1
12	T	November 8, 1970	3–3	@ Chicago Black Hawks (1970–71)	5–5–2
13	W	November 11, 1970	3–1	Los Angeles Kings (1970–71)	6–5–2
14	T	November 14, 1970	3–3	Vancouver Canucks (1970–71)	6–5–3
15	W	November 17, 1970	5–3	@ St. Louis Blues (1970–71)	7–5–3
16	L	November 18, 1970	4–8	Boston Bruins (1970–71)	7–6–3
17	W	November 21, 1970	3–0	Buffalo Sabres (1970–71)	8–6–3
18	L	November 22, 1970	0–2	@ New York Rangers (1970–71)	8–7–3
19	L	November 24, 1970	2–3	@ Vancouver Canucks (1970–71)	8–8–3
20	W	November 27, 1970	3–2	@ California Golden Seals (1970–71)	9–8–3
21	W	November 28, 1970	3–2	@ Los Angeles Kings (1970–71)	10–8–3

December

Game	Result	Date	Score	Opponent	Record
22	W	December 2, 1970	3–2	California Golden Seals (1970–71)	11–8–3
23	L	December 5, 1970	1–4	Chicago Black Hawks (1970–71)	11–9–3
24	L	December 6, 1970	0–1	@ Buffalo Sabres (1970–71)	11–10–3
25	T	December 9, 1970	2–2	Pittsburgh Penguins (1970–71)	11–10–4
26	L	December 10, 1970	1–6	@ Montreal Canadiens (1970–71)	11–11–4
27	W	December 12, 1970	1–0	@ Pittsburgh Penguins (1970–71)	12–11–4
28	L	December 13, 1970	2–5	@ Chicago Black Hawks (1970–71)	12–12–4
29	L	December 15, 1970	1–2	@ St. Louis Blues (1970–71)	12–13–4
30	T	December 16, 1970	1–1	Montreal Canadiens (1970–71)	12–13–5
31	L	December 19, 1970	3–5	New York Rangers (1970–71)	12–14–5
32	L	December 20, 1970	2–7	@ Boston Bruins (1970–71)	12–15–5
33	W	December 25, 1970	6–3	Toronto Maple Leafs (1970–71)	13–15–5
34	T	December 26, 1970	1–1	@ St. Louis Blues (1970–71)	13–15–6
35	L	December 30, 1970	2–6	Boston Bruins (1970–71)	13–16–6
36	L	December 31, 1970	1–4	@ Pittsburgh Penguins (1970–71)	13–17–6

January

Game	Result	Date	Score	Opponent	Record
37	T	January 2, 1971	3–3	@ Los Angeles Kings (1970–71)	13–17–7
38	L	January 5, 1971	0–2	Toronto Maple Leafs (1970–71)	13–18–7
39	T	January 6, 1971	4–4	@ Toronto Maple Leafs (1970–71)	13–18–8
40	L	January 9, 1971	0–1	New York Rangers (1970–71)	13–19–8
41	W	January 10, 1971	3–2	@ Chicago Black Hawks (1970–71)	14–19–8
42	T	January 14, 1971	3–3	Montreal Canadiens (1970–71)	14–19–9
43	L	January 16, 1971	3–4	Buffalo Sabres (1970–71)	14–20–9
44	W	January 17, 1971	2–0	@ Detroit Red Wings (1970–71)	15–20–9
45	W	January 21, 1971	5–3	St. Louis Blues (1970–71)	16–20–9
46	T	January 23, 1971	2–2	Philadelphia Flyers (1970–71)	16–20–10
47	L	January 24, 1971	2–6	@ New York Rangers (1970–71)	16–21–10
48	L	January 27, 1971	2–6	@ California Golden Seals (1970–71)	16–22–10
49	W	January 29, 1971	2–1	@ Vancouver Canucks (1970–71)	17–22–10
50	W	January 31, 1971	7–1	California Golden Seals (1970–71)	18–22–10

February

Game	Result	Date	Score	Opponent	Record
51	T	February 3, 1971	4–4	Detroit Red Wings (1970–71)	18–22–11
52	L	February 6, 1971	2–6	Chicago Black Hawks (1970–71)	18–23–11
53	T	February 7, 1971	4–4	@ Boston Bruins (1970–71)	18–23–12
54	L	February 10, 1971	3–4	@ New York Rangers (1970–71)	18–24–12
55	L	February 11, 1971	2–6	@ Montreal Canadiens (1970–71)	18–25–12
56	T	February 13, 1971	2–2	Philadelphia Flyers (1970–71)	18–25–13
57	W	February 14, 1971	5–4	Pittsburgh Penguins (1970–71)	19–25–13
58	W	February 17, 1971	3–2	California Golden Seals (1970–71)	20–25–13
59	L	February 18, 1971	3–5	@ Detroit Red Wings (1970–71)	20–26–13
60	L	February 21, 1971	1–4	Toronto Maple Leafs (1970–71)	20–27–13
61	W	February 24, 1971	5–1	Los Angeles Kings (1970–71)	21–27–13
62	T	February 25, 1971	1–1	@ Toronto Maple Leafs (1970–71)	21–27–14
63	W	February 27, 1971	4–2	Detroit Red Wings (1970–71)	22–27–14
64	L	February 28, 1971	2–5	@ Buffalo Sabres (1970–71)	22–28–14

March

Game	Result	Date	Score	Opponent	Record
65	L	March 2, 1971	0–6	Boston Bruins (1970–71)	22–29–14
66	W	March 6, 1971	3–1	Vancouver Canucks (1970–71)	23–29–14
67	W	March 7, 1971	3–1	Philadelphia Flyers (1970–71)	24–29–14
68	W	March 10, 1971	4–0	St. Louis Blues (1970–71)	25–29–14
69	T	March 13, 1971	0–0	@ Pittsburgh Penguins (1970–71)	25–29–15
70	L	March 14, 1971	0–5	Buffalo Sabres (1970–71)	25–30–15
71	W	March 16, 1971	7–2	@ Los Angeles Kings (1970–71)	26–30–15
72	W	March 21, 1971	6–3	@ Vancouver Canucks (1970–71)	27–30–15
73	W	March 23, 1971	3–1	Los Angeles Kings (1970–71)	28–30–15
74	T	March 25, 1971	2–2	@ Philadelphia Flyers (1970–71)	28–30–16
75	L	March 28, 1971	2–4	@ Buffalo Sabres (1970–71)	28–31–16
76	L	March 30, 1971	1–2	Vancouver Canucks (1970–71)	28–32–16
77	L	March 31, 1971	1–4	@ California Golden Seals (1970–71)	28–33–16

April

Game	Result	Date	Score	Opponent	Record
78	L	April 3, 1971	2–3	@ Philadelphia Flyers (1970–71)	28–34–16

Legend: Win (2 points) Loss (0 points) Tie (1 point)

=== Playoffs ===
1971 Stanley Cup playoffs
Quarterfinals vs. (W2) St. Louis Blues – North Stars win 4–2

Game	Result	Date	Score	Opponent	Series
1	W	April 7, 1971	3–2	@ St. Louis Blues	North Stars lead 1–0
2	L	April 8, 1971	2–4	@ St. Louis Blues	Series tied 1–1
3	L	April 10, 1971	0–3	St. Louis Blues	Blues lead 2–1
4	W	April 11, 1971	2–1	St. Louis Blues	Series tied 2–2
5	W	April 13, 1971	4–3	@ St. Louis Blues	North Stars lead 3–2
6	W	April 15, 1971	5–2	St. Louis Blues	North Stars win 4–2

Semifinals vs. (E3) Montreal Canadiens – Canadiens win 4–2

Game	Result	Date	Score	Opponent	Series
1	L	April 20, 1971	2–7	@ Montreal Canadiens	Canadiens lead 1–0
2	W	April 22, 1971	6–3	@ Montreal Canadiens	Series tied 1–1
3	L	April 24, 1971	3–6	Montreal Canadiens	Canadiens lead 2–1
4	W	April 25, 1971	5–2	Montreal Canadiens	Series tied 2–2
5	L	April 27, 1971	1–6	@ Montreal Canadiens	Canadiens lead 3–2
6	L	April 29, 1971	2–3	Montreal Canadiens	Canadiens win 4–2

Legend: Win Loss

== Draft picks ==
Minnesota's draft picks at the 1970 NHL amateur draft held at the Queen Elizabeth Hotel in Montreal.

Round	#	Player	Nationality	College/Junior/Club team (League)
2	17	Buster Harvey	Canada	Hamilton Red Wings (OHA)
2	20	Fred Barrett	Canada	Toronto Marlboros (OHA)
3	34	Dennis Patterson	Canada	Peterborough Petes (OHA)
4	48	Dave Cressman	Canada	Kitchener Rangers (OHA)
5	62	Hank Lehvonen	Canada	Kitchener Rangers (OHA)
6	76	Murray McNeil	Canada	Calgary Centennials (WCHL)
7	89	Gary Geldart	Canada	London Knights (OHA)
8	101	Mickey Donaldson	Canada	Peterborough Petes (OHA)

== See also ==
- 1970–71 NHL season
