= Brian Murphy (ice hockey) =

Canadian ice hockey player

- Born: August 20, 1947 (age 77); Toronto, Ontario, Canada
- Height: 6 ft 3 in (191 cm)
- Weight: 200 lb (91 kg; 14 st 4 lb)
- Position: Centre
- Shot: Left
- Played for: Detroit Red Wings
- Playing career: 1968–1978

Brian Murphy (born August 20, 1947) is a Canadian former professional ice hockey centre who played in one National Hockey League game for the Detroit Red Wings during the 1974–75 season on November 28, 1974, against the Buffalo Sabres. The rest of his career, which lasted from 1968 to 1978, was spent in various minor leagues.

== Career statistics ==
=== Regular season and playoffs ===
			Regular season					Playoffs
Season	Team	League	GP	G	A	Pts	PIM	GP	G	A	Pts	PIM
1964–65	Markham Waxers	MetJBHL	—	—	—	—	—	—	—	—	—	—
1964–65	Toronto Marlboros	OHA	4	0	0	0	0	—	—	—	—	—
1965–66	Markham Waxers	MetJBHL	40	24	16	40	—	—	—	—	—	—
1965–66	London Nationals	OHA	2	0	1	1	2	—	—	—	—	—
1966–67	London Nationals	WOHL	42	16	23	39	9	6	1	3	4	2
1967–68	London Nationals	WOHL	54	25	31	56	41	5	5	2	7	0
1968–69	Springfield Kings	AHL	72	7	8	15	15	—	—	—	—	—
1969–70	Springfield Kings	AHL	72	8	23	31	31	14	4	3	7	16
1970–71	Springfield Kings	AHL	51	11	8	19	27	8	2	0	2	0
1971–72	Baltimore Clippers	AHL	57	7	16	23	22	18	2	8	10	20
1972–73	Baltimore Clippers	AHL	73	23	36	59	53	—	—	—	—	—
1973–74	Baltimore Clippers	AHL	76	30	48	78	74	9	1	3	4	6
1974–75	Baltimore Clippers	AHL	16	1	2	3	13	—	—	—	—	—
1974–75	Detroit Red Wings	NHL	1	0	0	0	0	—	—	—	—	—
1974–75	Virginia Wings	AHL	45	10	20	30	33	5	2	1	3	14
1975–76	Rochester Americans	AHL	66	14	22	36	37	2	0	0	0	0
1977–78	Lancaster Lancers	OHA Sr	21	14	19	33	31	—	—	—	—	—
AHL totals			528	111	183	294	305	56	11	15	26	56
NHL totals			1	0	0	0	0	—	—	—	—	—

== See also ==
- List of players who played only one game in the NHL
