= 1970–71 St. Louis Blues season =

National Hockey League team season

1970–71 St. Louis Blues
- Division: 2nd West
- 1970–71 record: 34–25–19
- Home record: 23–7–9
- Road record: 11–18–10
- Goals for: 223
- Goals against: 208

Team information
- General manager: Scotty Bowman
- Coach: Scotty Bowman; Al Arbour
- Captain: Red Berenson; Al Arbour
- Alternate captains: Jim Roberts; Bob Plager
- Arena: St. Louis Arena
- Average attendance: 18,238 (102.6%)

Team leaders
- Goals: Christian Bordeleau (21)
- Assists: Frank St. Marseille (32)
- Points: Christian Bordeleau (53)
- Penalty minutes: Barclay Plager (172)
- Plus/minus: Christian Bordeleau (14)
- Wins: Ernie Wakely (20)
- Goals against average: Glenn Hall (2.42)

The 1970–71 St. Louis Blues season was the St. Louis Blues' fourth season in the National Hockey League (NHL).

The Blues began the 1970–71 season with high hopes after making a trip to the Stanley Cup Finals in the 1969–70 season. They purchased Christian Bordeleau from the Montreal Canadiens, who led the team in scoring and finished in the top five in game winning goals that season. They also sold Hall-of-Famer Jacques Plante to the Toronto Maple Leafs.

During this season the Blues saw the most ties in their history (19), as well as most home ties (9), and the fewest home losses (7).

== Regular season ==
=== Divisional standings ===
West Division
		GP	W	L	T	GF	GA	DIFF	Pts
1	Chicago Black Hawks	78	49	20	9	277	184	+93	107
2	St. Louis Blues	78	34	25	19	223	208	+15	87
3	Philadelphia Flyers	78	28	33	17	207	225	−18	73
4	Minnesota North Stars	78	28	34	16	191	223	−32	72
5	Los Angeles Kings	78	25	40	13	239	303	−64	63
6	Pittsburgh Penguins	78	21	37	20	221	240	−19	62
7	California Golden Seals	78	20	53	5	199	320	−121	45

=== Record vs. opponents ===
==== Vs. West Division ====
1970–71 NHL records
Team	CAL	CHI	LAK	MIN	PHI	PIT	STL	Total
California	—	1–5	1–5	2–4	2–3–1	1–4–1	1–4–1	8–25–3
Chicago	5–1	—	4–2	3–2–1	4–1–1	4–2	2–1–3	22–9–5
Los Angeles	5–1	2–4	—	0–5–1	1–2–3	4–2	2–4	14–18–4
Minnesota	4–2	2–3–1	5–0–1	—	1–2–3	3–1–2	3–1–2	18–9–9
Philadelphia	3–2–1	1–4–1	2–1–3	2–1–3	—	3–1–2	1–3–2	12–12–12
Pittsburgh	4–1–1	2–4	2–4	1–3–2	1–3–2	—	0–3–3	10–18–8
St. Louis	4–1–1	1–2–3	4–2	1–3–2	3–1–2	3–0–3	—	16–9–11

==== Vs. East Division ====
1970–71 NHL records
Team	BOS	BUF	DET	MTL	NYR	TOR	VAN	Total
California	1–5	3–3	2–4	1–5	2–3–1	2–3–1	1–5	12–28–2
Chicago	3–2–1	5–0–1	6–0	3–3	3–3	2–3–1	5–0–1	27–11–4
Los Angeles	1–5	1–2–3	2–1–3	2–4	0–4–2	3–3	2–3–1	11–22–9
Minnesota	0–5–1	1–5	3–2–1	1–3–2	0–6	2–2–2	3–2–1	10–25–7
Philadelphia	0–6	3–2–1	2–3–1	1–4–1	3–2–1	3–2–1	4–2	16–21–5
Pittsburgh	1–4–1	0–2–4	3–1–2	1–3–2	0–5–1	2–3–1	4–1–1	11–19–12
St. Louis	1–4–1	4–2	5–0–1	1–3–2	2–3–1	2–3–1	3–1–2	18–16–8

== Schedule and results ==
1970–71 regular season
October

Game	Date	Opponent	Result	Score	Record	Streak	Points
1	October 10	Rangers	W	3–1	1–0–0	W1	2
2	October 12	Canucks	W	4–1	2–0–0	W2	4
3	October 14	@Maple Leafs	L	3–7	2–1–0	L1	4
4	October 17	Sabres	W	4–1	3–1–0	W1	6
5	October 18	@Black Hawks	T	2–2	3–1–1	T1	7
6	October 21	@Golden Seals	T	2–2	3–1–2	T2	8
7	October 23	@Canucks	T	1–1	3–1–3	T3	9
8	October 24	@Kings	L	1–3	3–2–3	L1	9
9	October 28	Golden Seals	W	3–2	4–2–3	W1	11
10	October 31	Kings	W	3–0	5–2–3	W2	13

November

Game	Date	Opponent	Result	Score	Record	Streak	Points
11	November 5	@Bruins	W	2–0	6–2–3	W3	15
12	November 7	@North Stars	T	1–1	6–2–4	T1	16
13	November 12	Red Wings	W	2–1	7–2–4	W1	18
14	November 14	Canadiens	T	1–1	7–2–5	T1	19
15	November 15	@Flyers	W	2–1	8–2–5	W1	21
16	November 17	North Stars	L	3–5	8–3–5	L1	21
17	November 19	@Penguins	W	1–0	9–3–5	W1	23
18	November 21	Black Hawks	T	3–3	9–3–6	T1	24
19	November 24	Bruins	T	5–5	9–3–7	T2	25
20	November 26	Maple Leafs	W	1–0	10–3–7	W1	27
21	November 28	Canucks	W	5–1	11–3–7	W2	29

December

Game	Date	Opponent	Result	Score	Record	Streak	Points
22	December 2	@Rangers	L	2–4	11–4–7	L1	29
23	December 3	@Canadiens	L	3–6	11–5–7	L2	29
24	December 5	Red Wings	W	3–0	12–5–7	W1	31
25	December 6	@Red Wings	W	4–2	13–5–7	W2	33
26	December 9	Flyers	L	2–5	13–6–7	L1	33
27	December 11	Penguins	W	3–2	14–6–7	W1	35
28	December 13	@Flyers	T	2–2	14–6–8	T1	36
29	December 15	North Stars	W	2–1	15–6–8	W1	38
30	December 16	@Black Hawks	L	3–8	15–7–8	L1	38
31	December 19	Bruins	L	1–7	15–8–8	L2	38
32	December 23	Canadiens	T	2–2	15–8–9	T1	39
33	December 26	North Stars	T	1–1	15–8–10	T2	40
34	December 27	@Rangers	T	4–4	15–8–11	T3	41
35	December 30	Flyers	W	5–2	16–8–11	W1	43

January

Game	Date	Opponent	Result	Score	Record	Streak	Points
36	January 2	@Canucks	W	3–1	17–8–11	W2	45
37	January 3	@Kings	W	7–3	18–8–11	W3	47
38	January 6	@Golden Seals	L	3–6	18–9–11	L3	47
39	January 9	Canucks	T	2–2	18–9–12	T1	48
40	January 10	Rangers	L	2–4	18–10–12	L1	48
41	January 12	Golden Seals	W	8–2	19–10–12	W1	50
42	January 14	@Sabres	L	1–2	19–11–12	L1	50
43	January 16	Black Hawks	W	3–2	20–11–12	W1	52
44	January 21	@North Stars	L	3–5	20–12–12	L1	52
45	January 23	Sabres	W	7–1	21–12–12	W1	54
46	January 27	@Canadiens	L	3–5	21–13–12	L1	54
47	January 28	@Red Wings	T	1–1	21–13–13	T1	55
48	January 31	@Bruins	L	0–6	21–14–13	L1	55

February

Game	Date	Opponent	Result	Score	Record	Streak	Points
49	February 3	@Maple Leafs	L	2–6	21–15–13	L2	55
50	February 5	Penguins	T	2–2	21–15–14	T1	56
51	February 7	@Flyers	W	6–2	22–15–14	W1	58
52	February 9	Maple Leafs	T	3–3	22–15–15	T1	59
53	February 11	Bruins	L	3–5	22–16–15	L1	59
54	February 13	Rangers	W	2–1	23–16–15	W1	61
55	February 14	@Rangers	L	1–2	23–17–15	L1	61
56	February 16	Golden Seals	W	5–1	24–17–15	W1	63
57	February 20	@Maple Leafs	L	1–3	24–18–15	L1	63
58	February 21	@Sabres	W	3–1	25–18–15	W1	65
59	February 24	@Penguins	T	5–5	25–18–16	T1	66
60	February 25	@Red Wings	W	3–1	26–18–16	W1	68
61	February 27	@Canadiens	L	2–3	26–19–16	L1	68

March

Game	Date	Opponent	Result	Score	Record	Streak	Points
62	March 3	Black Hawks	L	1–5	26–20–16	L1	68
63	March 5	Maple Leafs	W	3–1	27–20–16	W1	70
64	March 7	@Bruins	L	1–4	27–21–16	L1	70
65	March 9	Kings	L	0–4	27–22–16	L2	70
66	March 10	@North Stars	L	0–4	27–23–16	L3	70
67	March 13	Sabres	W	9–0	28–23–16	W1	72
68	March 14	@Black Hawks	T	4–4	28–23–17	T1	73
69	March 16	Canadiens	W	6–2	29–23–17	W1	75
70	March 18	@Sabres	L	3–5	29–24–17	L1	75
71	March 20	Red Wings	W	2–1	30–24–17	W1	77
72	March 23	@Canucks	L	1–4	30–25–17	L1	77
73	March 26	@Golden Seals	W	8–5	31–25–17	W1	79
74	March 27	@Kings	W	6–3	32–25–17	W2	81
75	March 30	Kings	W	4–3	33–25–17	W3	83

April

Game	Date	Opponent	Result	Score	Record	Streak	Points
76	April 1	Flyers	T	1–1	33–25–18	T1	84
77	April 3	Penguins	W	4–3	34–25–18	W1	86
78	April 4	@Penguins	T	1–1	34–25–19	T1	87

Legend: Win (2 points) Loss (0 points) Tie (1 point)

== Playoffs ==
1971 Stanley Cup playoffs
Preliminary round vs. (7) Minnesota North Stars – North Stars win 4–2

Game	Date	Opponent	Score	Series
1	April 7	Minnesota	3–2	0–1
2	April 8	Minnesota	2–4	1–1
3	April 10	@Minnesota	3–0	2–1
4	April 11	@Minnesota	1–2	2–2
5	April 13	Minnesota	4–3	2–3
6	April 15	@Minnesota	2–5	2–4

Legend: Win Loss

== Player statistics ==
=== Skaters ===
Note: GP = Games played; G = Goals; A = Assists; Pts = Points; PIM = Penalties in minutes

		Regular season					Playoffs
Player	#	GP	G	A	Pts	PIM	GP	G	A	Pts	PIM
Christian Bordeleau	21	78	21	32	53	48	5	0	1	1	17
Bill Sutherland		68	19	20	39	41	1	0	0	0	0
Frank St. Marseille	9	77	19	32	51	26	6	2	1	3	4
Jim Lorentz	19	76	19	21	40	34	6	0	1	1	4
Red Berenson	7	45	16	26	42	12
Garry Unger		28	15	14	29	41	6	3	2	5	20
George Morrison	10	73	15	10	25	6	3	0	0	0	0
Tim Ecclestone	14	47	15	24	39	34
Gary Sabourin	11	59	14	17	31	56
Craig Cameron	16	78	14	6	20	32	6	2	0	2	4
Jim Roberts	6	72	13	18	31	77	6	2	1	3	11
Bill McCreary Sr.	15	68	9	10	19	16	6	1	2	3	0
Fran Huck		29	7	8	15	18	6	1	2	3	2
Terry Crisp	12	54	5	11	16	13	6	1	0	1	2
Wayne Connelly		28	5	16	21	9	6	2	1	3	0
Barclay Plager	8	69	4	20	24	172	6	0	3	3	10
Noel Picard	4	75	3	8	11	119	6	1	1	2	26
Bob Wall	2	25	2	4	6	4
Carl Brewer		19	2	9	11	29	5	0	2	2	8
Curt Bennett		4	2	0	2	0	2	0	0	0	0
Brit Selby		56	1	4	5	23
Larry Keenan	18	10	1	3	4	0
John Arbour		53	1	6	7	81	5	0	0	0	0
Bob Plager	5	70	1	19	20	114	6	0	2	2	4
Jean-Guy Talbot	17	5	0	0	0	6
Norm Dennis	25	4	0	0	0	0	3	0	0	0	0
Larry Hornung		1	0	0	0	0
Al Arbour		22	0	2	2	6	6	0	0	0	6
Bill Plager	23	36	0	3	3	45	1	0	0	0	2
Ab McDonald	20	20	0	5	5	6

=== Goaltenders ===
Note: GP = Games played; TOI = Time on ice (minutes); W = Wins; L = Losses; T = Ties; GA = Goals against; SO = Shutouts; Sv% = Save percentage; GAA = Goals against average

		Regular season									Playoffs
Player	#	GP	TOI	W	L	T	GA	SO	Sv%	GAA	GP	TOI	W	L	GA	SO	Sv%	GAA
Ernie Wakely	31	51	2859	20	14	11	133	3	90.4	2.79	3	180	2	1	7	1		2.33
Glenn Hall	1	32	1761	13	11	8	71	3	91.6	2.42	3	180	0	3	9	0		3.00
Michel Plasse		1	60	1	0	0	3	0	91.7%	3.00

== Draft picks ==
St. Louis's draft picks at the 1970 NHL amateur draft held at the Queen Elizabeth Hotel in Montreal.

Round	#	Player	Nationality	College/Junior/Club team (League)
2	23	Murray Keogan	Canada	University of Minnesota Duluth (NCAA)
3	37	Ron Climie	Canada	Hamilton Red Wings (OHA)
4	51	Gord Brooks	Canada	London Knights (OHA)
5	65	Mike Stevens	Canada	University of Minnesota Duluth (NCAA)
6	79	Claude Moreau	Canada	Montreal Junior Canadiens (OHA)
7	85	Jack Taggart	Canada	University of Denver (WCHA)
7	92	Terry Marshall	Canada	Brandon Wheat Kings (WCHL)
8	104	Dave Tataryn	Canada	Niagara Falls Flyers (OHA)
9	108	Bob Winograd	Canada	Colorado College (WCHA)
9	111	Mike Lampman	Canada	University of Denver (WCHA)
10	112	Jeff Rotsch	United States	University of Wisconsin (WCHA)
11	113	Al Calver	Canada	Kitchener Rangers (OHA)
12	114	Jerry MacDonald	Canada	St. Francis Xavier University (CIAU)
13	115	Gerald Haines	Canada	Kenora Muskies (MJHL)
