= Craig Cameron (ice hockey) =

Canadian ice hockey player (1945–2012)

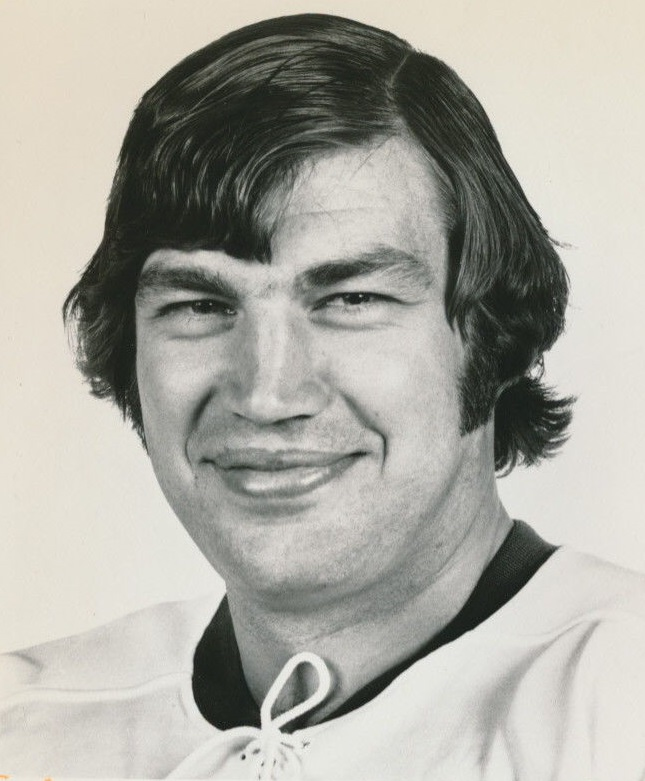
- Cameron in 1973
- Born: July 19, 1945 Edmonton, Alberta, Canada
- Died: April 20, 2012 (aged 66) St. Albert, Alberta, Canada
- Height: 6 ft 0 in (183 cm)
- Weight: 195 lb (88 kg; 13 st 13 lb)
- Position: Right wing
- Shot: Right
- Played for: Detroit Red Wings; St. Louis Blues; Minnesota North Stars; New York Islanders
- Playing career: 1966–1977

Craig Lauder Cameron (July 19, 1945 – April 20, 2012) was a Canadian ice hockey forward, who grew up in Namao, Alberta. He played 552 games in the National Hockey League between 1967 and 1976 with the Detroit Red Wings, St. Louis Blues, Minnesota North Stars, and New York Islanders.

== Career statistics ==
=== Regular season and playoffs ===
			Regular season					Playoffs
Season	Team	League	GP	G	A	Pts	PIM	GP	G	A	Pts	PIM
1964–65	Edmonton Oil Kings	ASHL	—	—	—	—	—	5	1	0	1	5
1964–65	Edmonton Oil Kings	M-Cup	—	—	—	—	—	21	5	6	11	20
1965–66	Edmonton Oil Kings	ASHL	40	17	15	32	19	11	6	2	8	14
1965–66	Edmonton Oil Kings	M-Cup	—	—	—	—	—	19	7	14	21	19
1966–67	Detroit Red Wings	NHL	1	0	0	0	0	—	—	—	—	—
1966–67	Memphis Wings	CHL	1	0	0	0	2	—	—	—	—	—
1966–67	Pittsburgh Hornets	AHL	50	9	11	20	12	—	—	—	—	—
1967–68	St. Louis Blues	NHL	32	7	2	9	8	14	1	0	1	11
1967–68	Kansas City Blues	CHL	32	12	12	24	27	—	—	—	—	—
1968–69	St. Louis Blues	NHL	72	11	5	16	40	2	0	0	0	0
1969–70	Baltimore Clippers	AHL	67	10	18	28	40	5	2	2	4	0
1970–71	St. Louis Blues	NHL	78	14	6	20	32	6	2	0	2	4
1971–72	Minnesota North Stars	NHL	64	2	1	3	11	5	0	1	1	2
1972–73	New York Islanders	NHL	72	19	14	33	27	—	—	—	—	—
1973–74	New York Islanders	NHL	78	15	14	29	28	—	—	—	—	—
1974–75	New York Islanders	NHL	37	1	6	7	4	—	—	—	—	—
1974–75	Minnesota North Stars	NHL	40	10	7	17	12	—	—	—	—	—
1975–76	Minnesota North Stars	NHL	78	8	10	18	34	—	—	—	—	—
1976–77	New Haven Nighthawks	AHL	79	14	26	40	33	6	0	0	0	2
NHL totals			552	87	65	152	196	27	3	1	4	17
