= Red Armstrong =

Canadian ice hockey player

- Born: October 17, 1938; Owen Sound, Ontario, Canada
- Died: July 23, 1974 (aged 35); Sault Ste. Marie, Ontario, Canada
- Height: 5 ft 11 in (180 cm)
- Weight: 205 lb (93 kg; 14 st 9 lb)
- Position: Right wing/Defence
- Shot: Left
- Played for: Toronto Maple Leafs; Rochester Americans
- Playing career: 1960–1973

Norman Gerrard "Red, Norm" Armstrong (October 17, 1938 – July 23, 1974) was a Canadian professional ice hockey player who played seven games in the National Hockey League with the Toronto Maple Leafs during the 1962–63 season. The rest of his career, which lasted from 1960 to 1973, was mainly spent in the American Hockey League.

== Playing career ==
Norm Armstrong played seven games in the NHL for the Toronto Maple Leafs. During those games, he scored one goal and added one assist for a total of two points. He also earned two penalty minutes.

He also played for the Rochester Americans of the American Hockey League.

He was inducted into the Rochester Americans Hall of Fame in 1986. He played for the Americans during 1962–71 and in 1972–73. He retired during training camp prior to the 1973–74 season. He is third in the Americans franchise for most games played at 566. Following his untimely death from a fall in a construction accident in 1974 at age 35, the Rochester Americans retired his number 6 jersey.

== Career statistics ==
=== Regular season and playoffs ===
| | | | Regular season | | | | | Playoffs |
| Season | Team | League | GP | G | A | Pts | PIM | GP | G | A | Pts | PIM |
|---|---|---|---|---|---|---|---|---|---|---|---|---|
| 1958–59 | Sarnia Legionnaires | WOJBHL | 45 | 21 | 25 | 46 | — | — | — | — | — | — |
| 1959–60 | Wallaceburg Hornets | OHA Sr | 36 | 3 | 13 | 16 | — | — | — | — | — | — |
| 1960–61 | Charlotte Checkers | EHL | 64 | 8 | 13 | 21 | 192 | — | — | — | — | — |
| 1961–62 | Charlotte Checkers | EHL | 2 | 0 | 1 | 1 | 2 | — | — | — | — | — |
| 1961–62 | Philadelphia Ramblers | EHL | 66 | 17 | 30 | 47 | 212 | 3 | 0 | 1 | 1 | 6 |
| 1962–63 | Toronto Maple Leafs | NHL | 7 | 1 | 1 | 2 | 2 | — | — | — | — | — |
| 1962–63 | Rochester Americans | AHL | 18 | 1 | 6 | 7 | 30 | — | — | — | — | — |
| 1962–63 | Sudbury Wolves | EPHL | 44 | 14 | 23 | 37 | 144 | 8 | 2 | 3 | 5 | 21 |
| 1963–64 | Rochester Americans | AHL | 67 | 17 | 13 | 30 | 112 | 2 | 0 | 1 | 1 | 4 |
| 1964–65 | Rochester Americans | AHL | 70 | 32 | 14 | 46 | 123 | 10 | 2 | 3 | 5 | 17 |
| 1965–66 | Rochester Americans | AHL | 67 | 14 | 26 | 40 | 146 | 12 | 0 | 0 | 0 | 12 |
| 1966–67 | Tulsa Oilers | CHL | 11 | 2 | 5 | 7 | 8 | — | — | — | — | — |
| 1966–67 | Rochester Americans | AHL | 57 | 13 | 34 | 47 | 77 | — | — | — | — | — |
| 1967–68 | Rochester Americans | AHL | 54 | 13 | 25 | 38 | 112 | 1 | 0 | 0 | 0 | 6 |
| 1968–69 | Rochester Americans | AHL | 74 | 29 | 40 | 69 | 133 | — | — | — | — | — |
| 1969–70 | Rochester Americans | AHL | 70 | 30 | 45 | 75 | 117 | — | — | — | — | — |
| 1970–71 | Rochester Americans | AHL | 44 | 13 | 17 | 30 | 101 | — | — | — | — | — |
| 1970–71 | Springfield Kings | AHL | 10 | 0 | 16 | 16 | 15 | 3 | 0 | 0 | 0 | 6 |
| 1971–72 | Baltimore Clippers | AHL | 68 | 9 | 15 | 24 | 61 | 18 | 2 | 2 | 4 | 19 |
| 1972–73 | Rochester Americans | AHL | 45 | 4 | 5 | 9 | 22 | 5 | 0 | 1 | 1 | 2 |
| AHL totals | | | 644 | 175 | 256 | 431 | 1049 | 51 | 4 | 7 | 11 | 66 |
| NHL totals | | | 7 | 1 | 1 | 2 | 2 | — | — | — | — | — |
