= 1970–71 New York Rangers season =

NHL hockey team season

1970–71 New York Rangers
- Division: 2nd East
- 1970–71 record: 49–18–11
- Home record: 30–2–7
- Road record: 19–16–4
- Goals for: 259
- Goals against: 177

Team information
- General manager: Emile Francis
- Coach: Emile Francis
- Captain: Bob Nevin
- Alternate captains: Jim Neilson; Rod Gilbert; Vic Hadfield
- Arena: Madison Square Garden

Team leaders
- Goals: Dave Balon (36)
- Assists: Walt Tkaczuk (49)
- Points: Walt Tkaczuk (75)
- Penalty minutes: Ted Irvine (137)
- Wins: Ed Giacomin (27)
- Goals against average: Ed Giacomin (2.16)

The 1970–71 New York Rangers season was the franchise's 45th season.

== Regular season ==
=== Final standings ===
East Division
		GP	W	L	T	GF	GA	DIFF	Pts
1	Boston Bruins	78	57	14	7	399	207	+192	121
2	New York Rangers	78	49	18	11	259	177	+82	109
3	Montreal Canadiens	78	42	23	13	291	216	+75	97
4	Toronto Maple Leafs	78	37	33	8	248	211	+37	82
5	Buffalo Sabres	78	24	39	15	217	291	−74	63
6	Vancouver Canucks	78	24	46	8	229	296	−67	56
7	Detroit Red Wings	78	22	45	11	209	308	−99	55

=== Record vs. opponents ===
==== Vs. East Division ====
1970–71 NHL records
Team	BOS	BUF	DET	MTL	NYR	TOR	VAN	Total
Boston	—	4–1–1	5–1	5–1	2–2–2	5–1	5–1	26–7–3
Buffalo	1–4–1	—	3–3	0–3–3	0–4–2	1–5	3–3	8–22–6
Detroit	1–5	3–3	—	1–4–1	1–4–1	1–4–1	4–2	11–22–3
Montreal	1–5	3–0–3	4–1–1	—	3–3	2–4	4–0–2	17–13–6
New York	2–2–2	4–0–2	4–1–1	3–3	—	5–1	5–1	23–8–5
Toronto	1–5	5–1	4–1–1	4–2	1–5	—	3–3	18–17–1
Vancouver	1–5	3–3	2–4	0–4–2	1–5	3–3	—	10–24–2

==== Vs. West Division ====
1970–71 NHL records
Team	CAL	CHI	LAK	MIN	PHI	PIT	STL	Total
Boston	5–1	2–3–1	5–1	5–0–1	6–0	4–1–1	4–1–1	31–7–4
Buffalo	3–3	0–5–1	2–1–3	5–1	2–3–1	2–0–4	2–4	16–17–9
Detroit	4–2	0–6	1–2–3	2–3–1	3–2–1	1–3–2	0–5–1	11–23–8
Montreal	5–1	3–3	4–2	3–1–2	4–1–1	3–1–2	3–1–2	25–10–7
New York	3–2–1	3–3	4–0–2	6–0	2–3–1	5–0–1	3–2–1	26–6–10
Toronto	3–2–1	3–2–1	3–3	2–2–2	2–3–1	3–2–1	3–2–1	19–16–7
Vancouver	5–1	0–5–1	3–2–1	2–3–1	2–4	1–4–1	1–3–2	14–22–6

== Schedule and results ==
1970–71 regular season
October: 6–2–1 (home: 4–0–1; road: 2–2–0)

Game	October	Opponent	Score	Record
1	10	@ St. Louis Blues	3–1	0–1–0
2	14	Buffalo Sabres	3–0	1–1–0
3	17	@ Toronto Maple Leafs	6–2	2–1–0
4	18	Montreal Canadiens	1–0	3–1–0
5	21	Toronto Maple Leafs	3–2	4–1–0
6	24	@ Minnesota North Stars	4–1	5–1–0
7	25	California Golden Seals	2–2	5–1–1
8	28	Detroit Red Wings	4–1	6–1–1
9	31	@ Boston Bruins	6–0	6–2–1

November: 7–3–3 (home: 4–0–2; road: 3–3–1)

Game	November	Opponent	Score	Record
10	1	Chicago Black Hawks	5–2	7–2–1
11	4	@ California Golden Seals	3–1	7–3–1
12	7	@ Los Angeles Kings	6–2	8–3–1
13	11	Pittsburgh Penguins	3–3	8–3–2
14	14	@ Chicago Black Hawks	2–1	8–4–2
15	15	Toronto Maple Leafs	4–2	9–4–2
16	18	@ Los Angeles Kings	5–3	10–4–2
17	21	@ Montreal Canadiens	5–4	11–4–2
18	22	Minnesota North Stars	2–0	12–4–2
19	25	@ Philadelphia Flyers	3–1	12–5–2
20	26	@ Buffalo Sabres	2–2	12–5–3
21	28	Boston Bruins	3–3	12–5–4
22	29	Pittsburgh Penguins	6–2	13–5–4

December: 11–2–2 (home: 7–0–1; road: 4–2–1)

Game	December	Opponent	Score	Record
23	2	St. Louis Blues	4–2	14–5–4
24	5	@ Toronto Maple Leafs	1–0	15–5–4
25	6	Vancouver Canucks	4–1	16–5–4
26	8	@ Vancouver Canucks	4–1	16–6–4
27	9	@ Los Angeles Kings	2–2	16–6–5
28	11	@ California Golden Seals	2–1	17–6–5
29	13	Los Angeles Kings	4–0	18–6–5
30	16	Buffalo Sabres	4–0	19–6–5
31	19	@ Minnesota North Stars	5–3	20–6–5
32	20	Vancouver Canucks	5–1	21–6–5
33	22	@ Buffalo Sabres	7–2	22–6–5
34	23	Pittsburgh Penguins	6–1	23–6–5
35	26	@ Detroit Red Wings	7–4	23–7–5
36	27	St. Louis Blues	4–4	23–7–6
37	29	California Golden Seals	3–2	24–7–6

January: 6–3–4 (home: 2–0–3; road: 4–3–1)

Game	January	Opponent	Score	Record
38	2	@ Pittsburgh Penguins	3–1	25–7–6
39	3	Montreal Canadiens	6–5	26–7–6
40	9	@ Minnesota North Stars	1–0	27–7–6
41	10	@ St. Louis Blues	4–2	28–7–6
42	12	@ Vancouver Canucks	4–2	29–7–6
43	15	@ California Golden Seals	3–1	29–8–6
44	17	@ Chicago Black Hawks	4–3	29–9–6
45	20	Philadelphia Flyers	3–3	29–9–7
46	21	@ Buffalo Sabres	5–5	29–9–8
47	24	Minnesota North Stars	6–2	30–9–8
48	27	Boston Bruins	2–2	30–9–9
49	30	@ Philadelphia Flyers	5–2	30–10–9
50	31	Los Angeles Kings	2–2	30–10–10

February: 9–4–0 (home: 5–1–0; road: 4–3–0)

Game	February	Opponent	Score	Record
51	3	Chicago Black Hawks	4–2	30–11–10
52	4	@ Detroit Red Wings	1–0	31–11–10
53	6	@ Vancouver Canucks	5–4	32–11–10
54	9	@ Boston Bruins	6–3	32–12–10
55	10	Minnesota North Stars	4–3	33–12–10
56	13	@ St. Louis Blues	2–1	33–13–10
57	14	St. Louis Blues	2–1	34–13–10
58	17	@ Montreal Canadiens	3–0	34–14–10
59	20	@ Pittsburgh Penguins	2–0	35–14–10
60	21	Detroit Red Wings	4–1	36–14–10
61	24	Philadelphia Flyers	4–2	37–14–10
62	27	@ Pittsburgh Penguins	4–0	38–14–10
63	28	Vancouver Canucks	4–2	39–14–10

March: 9–3–1 (home: 7–1–0; road: 2–2–1)

Game	March	Opponent	Score	Record
64	3	California Golden Seals	8–1	40–14–10
65	6	@ Detroit Red Wings	2–2	40–14–11
66	7	Los Angeles Kings	4–2	41–14–11
67	10	@ Chicago Black Hawks	4–2	42–14–11
68	12	Philadelphia Flyers	7–2	43–14–11
69	14	Toronto Maple Leafs	1–0	44–14–11
70	18	@ Philadelphia Flyers	2–1	44–15–11
71	20	@ Toronto Maple Leafs	3–1	44–16–11
72	21	Montreal Canadiens	6–2	44–17–11
73	23	Buffalo Sabres	7–2	45–17–11
74	27	@ Boston Bruins	6–3	46–17–11
75	28	Boston Bruins	2–1	47–17–11
76	31	Chicago Black Hawks	4–2	48–17–11

April: 1–1–0 (home: 1–0–0; road: 0–1–0)

Game	April	Opponent	Score	Record
77	3	@ Montreal Canadiens	7–2	48–18–11
78	4	Detroit Red Wings	6–0	49–18–11

Legend: Win (2 points) Loss (0 points) Tie (1 point)

== Playoffs ==
1971 Stanley Cup playoffs
Quarterfinals vs. (E4) Toronto Maple Leafs – Rangers win 4–2

Game	Date	Visitor	Score	Home	OT	Series
1	April 7	Toronto Maple Leafs	4–5	New York Rangers		New York Rangers lead series 1–0
2	April 8	Toronto Maple Leafs	4–1	New York Rangers		Series tied 1–1
3	April 10	New York Rangers	1–3	Toronto Maple Leafs		Toronto leads series 2–1
4	April 11	New York Rangers	4–2	Toronto Maple Leafs		Series tied 2–2
5	April 13	Toronto Maple Leafs	1–3	New York Rangers		New York Rangers lead series 3–2
6	April 15	New York Rangers	2–1	Toronto Maple Leafs	OT	New York Rangers win series 4–2

Semifinals vs. (W1) Chicago Black Hawks – Black Hawks win 4–3

Game	Date	Visitor	Score	Home	OT	Series
1	April 18	New York Rangers	2–1	Chicago Black Hawks	OT	New York Rangers lead series 1–0
2	April 20	New York Rangers	0–3	Chicago Black Hawks		Series tied 1–1
3	April 22	Chicago Black Hawks	1–4	New York Rangers		New York Rangers lead series 2–1
4	April 25	Chicago Black Hawks	7–1	New York Rangers		Series tied 2–2
5	April 27	New York Rangers	2–3	Chicago Black Hawks	OT	Chicago leads series 3–2
6	April 29	Chicago Black Hawks	2–3	New York Rangers	OT	Series tied 3–3
7	May 2	New York Rangers	2–4	Chicago Black Hawks		Chicago wins series 4–3

Legend: Win Loss

== Player statistics ==
Skaters

Regular season
Player	GP	G	A	Pts	PIM
Walt Tkaczuk	77	26	49	75	48
Jean Ratelle	78	26	46	72	14
Rod Gilbert	78	30	31	61	65
Dave Balon	78	36	24	60	34
Bob Nevin	78	21	25	46	10
Pete Stemkowski^{†}	68	16	29	45	61
Vic Hadfield	63	22	22	44	38
Brad Park	68	7	37	44	114
Ted Irvine	76	20	18	38	137
Jim Neilson	77	8	24	32	69
Bill Fairbairn	56	7	23	30	32
Rod Seiling	68	5	22	27	34
Bruce MacGregor^{†}	27	12	13	25	4
Tim Horton	78	2	18	20	57
Jack Egers	60	7	10	17	50
Arnie Brown^{‡}	48	3	12	15	24
Ron Stewart	76	5	6	11	19
Dale Rolfe^{†}	14	0	7	7	23
Andre Dupont	7	1	2	3	21
Syl Apps^{‡}	31	1	2	3	11
Glen Sather^{†}	31	2	0	2	52
Mike Robitaille^{‡}	11	1	1	2	7
Larry Brown^{†}	31	1	1	2	10
Jim Krulicki^{‡}	27	0	2	2	6
Ab DeMarco	2	0	1	1	0
Don Luce^{‡}	9	0	1	1	0
Don Blackburn	1	0	0	0	0

Playoffs
Player	GP	G	A	Pts	PIM
Vic Hadfield	13	8	5	13	46
Jean Ratelle	13	2	9	11	8
Rod Gilbert	13	4	6	10	8
Bob Nevin	13	5	3	8	0
Walt Tkaczuk	13	1	5	6	14
Tim Horton	13	1	4	5	14
Pete Stemkowski	13	3	2	5	6
Dave Balon	13	3	2	5	4
Bruce MacGregor	13	0	4	4	2
Brad Park	13	0	4	4	42
Jim Neilson	13	0	3	3	30
Ted Irvine	12	1	2	3	28
Larry Brown	11	0	1	1	0
Glen Sather	13	0	1	1	18
Dale Rolfe	13	0	1	1	14
Ron Stewart	13	1	0	1	0
Rod Seiling	13	1	0	1	12
Jack Egers	3	0	0	0	2
Bill Fairbairn	4	0	0	0	0

Goaltenders

Regular season
Player	GP	TOI	W	L	T	GA	GAA	SO
Ed Giacomin	45	2641	27	10	7	95	2.16	8
Gilles Villemure	34	2039	22	8	4	78	2.30	4

Playoffs
Player	GP	TOI	W	L	GA	GAA	SO
Ed Giacomin	12	759	7	5	28	2.21	0
Gilles Villemure	2	80	0	1	6	4.50	0

^{†}Denotes player spent time with another team before joining Rangers. Stats reflect time with Rangers only.
^{‡}Traded mid-season. Stats reflect time with Rangers only.

Note:

Pos = Position;GP = Games played; G = Goals; A = Assists; Pts = Points; PIM = Penalty minutes; +/- = Plus/minus; PPG = Power-play goals; SHG = Short-handed goals; GWG = Game-winning goals
Pos = Position;GP = Games played; Min, TOI = Minutes played; W = Wins; L = Losses; T,T/OT = Ties; OTL = Overtime losses; GA = Goals-against; GAA = Goals-against average; SO = Shutouts; SA = Shots against; SV = Shots saved;SV% = Save percentage;

== Draft picks ==
New York's picks at the 1970 NHL amateur draft in Montreal, Canada.

Round	#	Player	Position	Nationality	College/Junior/Club team (League)
1	11	Norm Gratton	RW	Canada	Montreal Junior Canadiens (OHA)
2	25	Mike Murphy	RW	Canada	Toronto Marlboros (OHA)
3	39	Wendell Bennett	RW	Canada	Weyburn Red Wings (SJHL)
4	53	Andre St. Pierre	D	Canada	Drummondville Rangers (QMJHL)
5	67	Gary Coalter	RW	Canada	Hamilton Red Wings (OHA)
6	81	Duane Wylie	C	United States	St. Catharines Black Hawks (OHA)
7	94	Wayne Bell	G	Canada	Estevan Bruins (WCHL)
8	106	Pierre Brind'Amour	LW	Canada	Montreal Junior Canadiens (OHA)

== See also ==
- 1970–71 NHL season
