= 1970–71 Chicago Black Hawks season =

National Hockey League team season

1970–71 Chicago Black Hawks
- West Division champions
- Division: 1st West
- 1970–71 record: 49–20–9
- Home record: 30–6–3
- Road record: 19–14–6
- Goals for: 277
- Goals against: 184

Team information
- General manager: Tommy Ivan
- Coach: Billy Reay
- Captain: Vacant
- Alternate captains: Stan Mikita
- Arena: Chicago Stadium

Team leaders
- Goals: Bobby Hull (44)
- Assists: Bobby Hull (52)
- Points: Bobby Hull (96)
- Penalty minutes: Keith Magnuson (291)
- Plus/minus: Bill White (+51)
- Wins: Tony Esposito (35)
- Goals against average: Tony Esposito (2.27)

The 1970–71 Chicago Black Hawks season was the Hawks' 45th. The Black Hawks advanced to the Stanley Cup Finals for the first time since 1965 but were defeated by the Montreal Canadiens in seven games.

== Offseason ==
During the off-season, the NHL would expand by two teams, as the Buffalo Sabres and Vancouver Canucks joined the league, and both clubs were placed in the East Division. The league also increased the schedule by two games, going from 76 to 78. The Black Hawks were moved to the West Division as part of the divisional realignment, and the club decided to strip Pat Stapleton from his team captaincy, electing to not have a captain of the team.

== Regular season ==
Chicago started the season very well, as the team had a record of 18–4–5 in their first 27 games. The Hawks stayed hot throughout the season, and easily won the West Division with a club record 49 victories and 107 points, finishing 20 points ahead of the second place St. Louis Blues.

Offensively, the Hawks were led by Bobby Hull, who scored a team high 44 goals and 52 assists for 96 points, which placed him fifth in NHL scoring. His brother Dennis Hull also cracked the 40 goal barrier, as he scored 40 goals and added 26 assists for 66 points. Stan Mikita had another solid season, scoring 28 goals and 72 points. Pit Martin and Bryan Campbell each had very good seasons, finishing with 55 and 54 points respectively. On the blueline, Pat Stapleton led the team with 7 goals and 51 points, while Bill White chipped in with 4 goals and 25 points. White also led the club with a +51 rating. Keith Magnuson led the Hawks in toughness, setting a team record with 291 penalty minutes.

In goal, Tony Esposito led the club with 35 victories and a 2.27 GAA, along with six shutouts while appearing in 57 games. Backup goaltender Gerry Desjardins was very solid, winning 12 games while having a 2.47 GAA.

=== Season standings ===
West Division
		GP	W	L	T	GF	GA	DIFF	Pts
1	Chicago Black Hawks	78	49	20	9	277	184	+93	107
2	St. Louis Blues	78	34	25	19	223	208	+15	87
3	Philadelphia Flyers	78	28	33	17	207	225	−18	73
4	Minnesota North Stars	78	28	34	16	191	223	−32	72
5	Los Angeles Kings	78	25	40	13	239	303	−64	63
6	Pittsburgh Penguins	78	21	37	20	221	240	−19	62
7	California Golden Seals	78	20	53	5	199	320	−121	45

=== Record vs. opponents ===
==== Vs. West Division ====
1970–71 NHL records
Team	CAL	CHI	LAK	MIN	PHI	PIT	STL	Total
California	—	1–5	1–5	2–4	2–3–1	1–4–1	1–4–1	8–25–3
Chicago	5–1	—	4–2	3–2–1	4–1–1	4–2	2–1–3	22–9–5
Los Angeles	5–1	2–4	—	0–5–1	1–2–3	4–2	2–4	14–18–4
Minnesota	4–2	2–3–1	5–0–1	—	1–2–3	3–1–2	3–1–2	18–9–9
Philadelphia	3–2–1	1–4–1	2–1–3	2–1–3	—	3–1–2	1–3–2	12–12–12
Pittsburgh	4–1–1	2–4	2–4	1–3–2	1–3–2	—	0–3–3	10–18–8
St. Louis	4–1–1	1–2–3	4–2	1–3–2	3–1–2	3–0–3	—	16–9–11

==== Vs. East Division ====
1970–71 NHL records
Team	BOS	BUF	DET	MTL	NYR	TOR	VAN	Total
California	1–5	3–3	2–4	1–5	2–3–1	2–3–1	1–5	12–28–2
Chicago	3–2–1	5–0–1	6–0	3–3	3–3	2–3–1	5–0–1	27–11–4
Los Angeles	1–5	1–2–3	2–1–3	2–4	0–4–2	3–3	2–3–1	11–22–9
Minnesota	0–5–1	1–5	3–2–1	1–3–2	0–6	2–2–2	3–2–1	10–25–7
Philadelphia	0–6	3–2–1	2–3–1	1–4–1	3–2–1	3–2–1	4–2	16–21–5
Pittsburgh	1–4–1	0–2–4	3–1–2	1–3–2	0–5–1	2–3–1	4–1–1	11–19–12
St. Louis	1–4–1	4–2	5–0–1	1–3–2	2–3–1	2–3–1	3–1–2	18–16–8

== Playoffs ==
The Hawks opened the playoffs against the Philadelphia Flyers, who had placed third in the West Division with a record of 28–33–17, earning 73 points. The series opened with two games at Chicago Stadium, and the Black Hawks, who won a club record 30 games at home, continued their dominance, easily defeating the Flyers 5–2 and 6–2 to take a 2–0 series lead. The series moved to the Philadelphia Spectrum for the next two games, however, the Hawks were too much to handle for the Flyers, as Chicago won a close third game by a 3–2 score, before sweeping Philadelphia out of the playoffs with a 6–2 win in the fourth game.

Chicago's next opponent was the New York Rangers, who had finished the season in second place in the East Division with a 49–18–11 record, earning 109 points. The Rangers defeated the Toronto Maple Leafs in their first playoff series. Since the Black Hawks won their division, they were given a home-ice advantage in the series. The series opened up with two games at Chicago Stadium, however, the Rangers took a 1–0 series lead, defeating the Hawks in overtime by a 2–1 score. Chicago evened the series in the next game, shutting out New York 3–0. The series shifted to Madison Square Garden for the next two games, and the Rangers won the third game of the series by a 4–1 score, however, Chicago fought back in the fourth game, demolishing New York 7–1 to once again even the series. The fifth game was back in Chicago, and the Hawks took the series lead for the first time with a 3–2 overtime victory. Back in New York for the sixth game, the Rangers pushed the series to the limit, with their second overtime victory of the series, setting up a seventh and deciding game in Chicago. The Black Hawks used their home-ice advantage, and held on for a 4–2 victory, to win the series, and earn their first trip to the Stanley Cup Finals for the first time since 1965.

The Black Hawks opponent was the Montreal Canadiens, who finished the season in third place in the East with a 42–23–13 record, earning 97 points. Montreal then upset the heavily favored Boston Bruins in the first round, followed by defeating the Minnesota North Stars in the second round. The series opened with two games at Chicago Stadium, and the Hawks took a commanding 2–0 series lead, defeating the Canadiens 2–1 and 5–3. The series shifted to the Montreal Forum for the next two games, and the Canadiens evened the series with two home wins of their own, by scores of 4–2 and 5–2. The fifth game returned to Chicago, and the Black Hawks stayed hot at home, shutting out Montreal 2–0 to take a 3–2 series lead with a chance to win the Stanley Cup in Montreal for game 6. However, the Canadiens forced a seventh and deciding game, winning by a score of 4–3. In the seventh game at Chicago Stadium, where the Hawks were 7–1 during the playoffs, the Black Hawks led 2–0 halfway through the game, but the Canadiens cut into the lead when Jacques Lemaire scored on a shot from center ice that got past Hawks goaltender Tony Esposito. The Canadiens tied the game at two before the end of the second when Henri Richard scored, setting up an intense third period. Richard once again scored 2:34 into the period, giving Montreal a 3–2 lead, and Canadiens goaltender Ken Dryden kept the Black Hawks off the scoreboard for the rest of the game, as Montreal would win the Stanley Cup in dramatic fashion for their third championship in four years. The Canadiens were the second team in NHL history, the other the 1945 Toronto Maple Leafs to win a game seven on the road in the Stanley Cup Finals.

== Schedule and results ==
=== Regular season ===
1970–71 regular season
October

Game	Date	Visitor	Score	Home	Record	Points
1	October 11	Bay Area Seals	1–5	Chicago Black Hawks	1–0–0	2
2	October 14	Vancouver Canucks	2–8	Chicago Black Hawks	2–0–0	4
3	October 15	Chicago Black Hawks	2–1	Detroit Red Wings	3–0–0	6
4	October 17	Chicago Black Hawks	2–6	Montreal Canadiens	3–1–0	6
5	October 18	St. Louis Blues	2–2	Chicago Black Hawks	3–1–1	7
6	October 22	Chicago Black Hawks	3–3	Boston Bruins	3–1–2	8
7	October 24	Chicago Black Hawks	1–0	Toronto Maple Leafs	4–1–2	10
8	October 25	Chicago Black Hawks	4–0	Buffalo Sabres	5–1–2	12
9	October 28	Chicago Black Hawks	1–2	Minnesota North Stars	5–2–2	12
10	October 31	Chicago Black Hawks	5–2	Pittsburgh Penguins	6–2–2	14

November

Game	Date	Visitor	Score	Home	Record	Points
11	November 1	Chicago Black Hawks	2–5	New York Rangers	6–3–2	14
12	November 4	Detroit Red Wings	2–4	Chicago Black Hawks	7–3–2	16
13	November 7	Chicago Black Hawks	1–1	Philadelphia Flyers	7–3–3	17
14	November 8	Minnesota North Stars	3–3	Chicago Black Hawks	7–3–4	18
15	November 11	Philadelphia Flyers	1–7	Chicago Black Hawks	8–3–4	20
16	November 14	New York Rangers	1–2	Chicago Black Hawks	9–3–4	22
17	November 15	Vancouver Canucks	2–4	Chicago Black Hawks	10–3–4	24
18	November 21	Chicago Black Hawks	3–3	St. Louis Blues	10–3–5	25
19	November 22	California Golden Seals	0–9	Chicago Black Hawks	11–3–5	27
20	November 25	Montreal Canadiens	3–5	Chicago Black Hawks	12–3–5	29
21	November 26	Chicago Black Hawks	2–3	Boston Bruins	12–4–5	29
22	November 28	Philadelphia Flyers	1–3	Chicago Black Hawks	13–4–5	31
23	November 29	Los Angeles Kings	3–5	Chicago Black Hawks	14–4–5	33

December

Game	Date	Visitor	Score	Home	Record	Points
24	December 2	Boston Bruins	3–4	Chicago Black Hawks	15–4–5	35
25	December 5	Chicago Black Hawks	4–1	Minnesota North Stars	16–4–5	37
26	December 6	Toronto Maple Leafs	2–6	Chicago Black Hawks	17–4–5	39
27	December 9	Buffalo Sabres	1–6	Chicago Black Hawks	18–4–5	41
28	December 12	Chicago Black Hawks	1–2	Toronto Maple Leafs	18–5–5	41
29	December 13	Minnesota North Stars	2–5	Chicago Black Hawks	19–5–5	43
30	December 16	St. Louis Blues	3–8	Chicago Black Hawks	20–5–5	45
31	December 20	Pittsburgh Penguins	1–2	Chicago Black Hawks	21–5–5	47
32	December 22	Chicago Black Hawks	2–5	California Golden Seals	21–6–5	47
33	December 23	Chicago Black Hawks	6–4	Los Angeles Kings	22–6–5	49
34	December 26	Chicago Black Hawks	4–2	Vancouver Canucks	23–6–5	51
35	December 31	Chicago Black Hawks	8–3	Detroit Red Wings	24–6–5	53

January

Game	Date	Visitor	Score	Home	Record	Points
36	January 2	Chicago Black Hawks	3–1	Philadelphia Flyers	25–6–5	55
37	January 3	Chicago Black Hawks	5–3	Buffalo Sabres	26–6–5	57
38	January 6	Los Angeles Kings	4–2	Chicago Black Hawks	26–7–5	57
39	January 9	Boston Bruins	3–4	Chicago Black Hawks	27–7–5	59
40	January 10	Minnesota North Stars	3–2	Chicago Black Hawks	27–8–5	59
41	January 13	Buffalo Sabres	2–4	Chicago Black Hawks	28–8–5	61
42	January 16	Chicago Black Hawks	2–3	St. Louis Blues	28–9–5	61
43	January 17	New York Rangers	3–4	Chicago Black Hawks	29–9–5	63
44	January 21	Detroit Red Wings	0–2	Chicago Black Hawks	30–9–5	65
45	January 23	Chicago Black Hawks	2–6	Boston Bruins	30–10–5	65
46	January 24	California Golden Seals	3–5	Chicago Black Hawks	31–10–5	67
47	January 26	Chicago Black Hawks	3–3	Vancouver Canucks	31–10–6	68
48	January 28	Pittsburgh Penguins	1–4	Chicago Black Hawks	32–10–6	70
49	January 30	Chicago Black Hawks	1–3	Pittsburgh Penguins	32–11–6	70
50	January 31	Montreal Canadiens	1–4	Chicago Black Hawks	33–11–6	72

February

Game	Date	Visitor	Score	Home	Record	Points
51	February 3	Chicago Black Hawks	4–2	New York Rangers	34–11–6	74
52	February 4	Chicago Black Hawks	2–6	Philadelphia Flyers	34–12–6	74
53	February 6	Chicago Black Hawks	6–2	Minnesota North Stars	35–12–6	76
54	February 7	Pittsburgh Penguins	0–1	Chicago Black Hawks	36–12–6	78
55	February 10	Toronto Maple Leafs	3–2	Chicago Black Hawks	36–13–6	78
56	February 13	Chicago Black Hawks	4–5	Pittsburgh Penguins	36–14–6	78
57	February 14	Vancouver Canucks	1–3	Chicago Black Hawks	37–14–6	80
58	February 17	Buffalo Sabres	1–5	Chicago Black Hawks	38–14–6	82
59	February 20	Chicago Black Hawks	1–7	Montreal Canadiens	38–15–6	82
60	February 21	Los Angeles Kings	5–7	Chicago Black Hawks	39–15–6	84
61	February 26	Chicago Black Hawks	3–1	California Golden Seals	40–15–6	86
62	February 27	Chicago Black Hawks	4–1	Los Angeles Kings	41–15–6	88

March

Game	Date	Visitor	Score	Home	Record	Points
63	March 3	Chicago Black Hawks	5–1	St. Louis Blues	42–15–6	90
64	March 5	Chicago Black Hawks	2–2	Buffalo Sabres	42–15–7	91
65	March 6	Chicago Black Hawks	2–2	Toronto Maple Leafs	42–15–8	92
66	March 10	New York Rangers	4–2	Chicago Black Hawks	42–16–8	92
67	March 13	Chicago Black Hawks	4–1	Montreal Canadiens	43–16–8	94
68	March 14	St. Louis Blues	4–4	Chicago Black Hawks	43–16–9	95
69	March 16	Chicago Black Hawks	7–4	Vancouver Canucks	44–16–9	97
70	March 18	Chicago Black Hawks	2–3	Los Angeles Kings	44–17–9	97
71	March 19	Chicago Black Hawks	4–2	California Golden Seals	45–17–9	99
72	March 21	Detroit Red Wings	0–2	Chicago Black Hawks	46–17–9	101
73	March 24	Boston Bruins	1–2	Chicago Black Hawks	47–17–9	103
74	March 27	Philadelphia Flyers	1–3	Chicago Black Hawks	48–17–9	105
75	March 28	Montreal Canadiens	2–1	Chicago Black Hawks	48–18–9	105
76	March 31	Chicago Black Hawks	2–4	New York Rangers	48–19–9	105

April

Game	Date	Visitor	Score	Home	Record	Points
77	April 3	Chicago Black Hawks	4–1	Detroit Red Wings	49–19–9	107
78	April 4	Toronto Maple Leafs	3–2	Chicago Black Hawks	49–20–9	107

Legend: Win (2 points) Loss (0 points) Tie (1 point)

=== Playoffs ===
1971 Stanley Cup playoffs
Quarterfinals vs. (W3) Philadelphia Flyers – Black Hawks win 4–0

Game	Date	Visitor	Score	Home	Series
1	April 7	Philadelphia Flyers	2–5	Chicago Black Hawks	1–0
2	April 8	Philadelphia Flyers	2–6	Chicago Black Hawks	2–0
3	April 10	Chicago Black Hawks	3–2	Philadelphia Flyers	3–0
4	April 11	Chicago Black Hawks	6–2	Philadelphia Flyers	4–0

Semifinals vs. (E2) New York Rangers – Black Hawks win 4–3

Game	Date	Visitor	Score	Home	Series
1	April 18	New York Rangers	2–1	Chicago Black Hawks	0–1
2	April 20	New York Rangers	0–3	Chicago Black Hawks	1–1
3	April 22	Chicago Black Hawks	1–4	New York Rangers	1–2
4	April 25	Chicago Black Hawks	7–1	New York Rangers	2–2
5	April 27	New York Rangers	2–3	Chicago Black Hawks	3–2
6	April 29	Chicago Black Hawks	2–3	New York Rangers	3–3
7	May 2	New York Rangers	2–4	Chicago Black Hawks	4–3

Stanley Cup Finals vs. (E3) Montreal Canadiens – Canadiens win 4–3

Game	Date	Visitor	Score	Home	Series
1	May 4	Montreal Canadiens	1–2	Chicago Black Hawks	1–0
2	May 6	Montreal Canadiens	3–5	Chicago Black Hawks	2–0
3	May 9	Chicago Black Hawks	2–4	Montreal Canadiens	2–1
4	May 11	Chicago Black Hawks	2–5	Montreal Canadiens	2–2
5	May 13	Montreal Canadiens	0–2	Chicago Black Hawks	3–2
6	May 16	Chicago Black Hawks	3–4	Montreal Canadiens	3–3
7	May 18	Montreal Canadiens	3–2	Chicago Black Hawks	3–4

Legend: Win Loss

== Season stats ==
=== Scoring leaders ===
Player	GP	G	A	Pts	PIM
Bobby Hull	78	44	52	96	32
Stan Mikita	74	24	48	72	85
Dennis Hull	78	40	26	66	16
Pit Martin	62	22	33	55	40
Bryan Campbell	78	17	37	54	26

=== Goaltending ===
= Indicates league leader

Player	GP	TOI	W	L	T	GA	SO	GAA
Tony Esposito	57	3325	35	14	6	126	6	2.27
Gerry Desjardins	22	1217	12	6	3	49	0	2.42
Gilles Meloche	2	120	2	0	0	6	0	3.00
Ken Brown	1	18	0	0	0	1	0	3.33

== Playoff stats ==
=== Scoring leaders ===
Player	GP	G	A	Pts	PIM
Bobby Hull	18	11	14	25	16
Stan Mikita	18	5	13	18	16
Pat Stapleton	18	3	14	17	4
Cliff Koroll	18	7	9	16	18
Jim Pappin	18	10	4	14	24

=== Goaltending ===
Player	GP	TOI	W	L	GA	SO	GAA
Tony Esposito	18	1151	11	7	42	2	2.19

== Draft picks ==
Chicago's draft picks at the 1970 NHL amateur draft held at the Queen Elizabeth Hotel in Montreal.

Round	#	Player	Nationality	College/Junior/Club team (League)
1	14	Dan Maloney	Canada	London Knights (OHA)
2	28	Michel Archambault	Canada	Drummondville Rangers (QMJHL)
3	42	Len Frig	Canada	Calgary Centennials (WCHL)
4	56	Walt Ledingham	Canada	University of Minnesota-Duluth (NCAA)
5	70	Gilles Meloche	Canada	Verdun Maple Leafs (QMJHL)

== See also ==
- 1970–71 NHL season

== Sources ==
- Hockey-Reference
- Rauzulu's Street
- Goalies Archive
- HockeyDB
- National Hockey League Guide & Record Book 2007
