= 1974–75 Kansas City Scouts season =

NHL hockey team season (inaugural season)

1974–75 Kansas City Scouts
- Division: 5th Smythe
- Conference: 9th Campbell
- 1974–75 record: 15–54–11
- Home record: 12–20–8
- Road record: 3–34–3
- Goals for: 184
- Goals against: 328

Team information
- General manager: Sid Abel
- Coach: Bep Guidolin
- Captain: Simon Nolet
- Alternate captains: Randy Rota; Brent Hughes
- Arena: Kemper Arena

Team leaders
- Goals: Simon Nolet and Wilf Paiement (26)
- Assists: Simon Nolet (32)
- Points: Simon Nolet (58)
- Penalty minutes: Wilf Paiement (101)
- Wins: Peter McDuffe (7)
- Goals against average: Denis Herron (3.75)

The 1974–75 Kansas City Scouts season was the first season for the franchise now known as the New Jersey Devils. The NHL completed its first 8-year expansion cycle by adding franchises in Washington and Kansas City. Kansas City was awarded an NHL franchise on June 8, 1972. The city had a hockey history but had been a home to minor league hockey teams only. Initially, the franchise chose MO-Hawks as their nickname to reflect a Missouri-Kansas union, an attempt to appeal to both Kansas and Missouri residents (the Kansas City metropolitan area spills across both states) and incorporating Missouri's postal abbreviation with the Kansas Jayhawker nickname, but the name was vetoed by the Chicago Black Hawks. Therefore, the franchise selected its second choice, Scouts. This was named after The Scout, a famous statue overlooking the city.

The arrival of the Scouts and Capitals led the NHL into creating four divisions, the Adams, Norris, Patrick and Smythe Divisions. The Scouts would be placed in the Smythe Division while their expansion cousins, the Capitals, would be in the Norris Division. The Scouts played for the first time on October 9 in Toronto. With construction of Kemper Arena (the Scouts home arena) starting late, then delayed by union work stoppages, the Scouts were forced to play their first 8 games on the road losing 7 and tying 1. On November 2, the Scouts made their home debut losing 4–3 to the Black Hawks. The following day they would get their first win beating the Capitals in Washington 5–4. The highlight of the seasons would come on January 23 when the Scouts upset the Bruins 3–2 in Boston. Despite being led in scoring by team captain Simon Nolet, the Scouts finished in last place with a 15–54–11 record.

Kansas City's games aired on radio station WDAF-AM with Dick Carlson the play-by-play broadcaster. A limited number of road contests were televised by KBMA Channel 41. Gene Osborn handled play-by-play with Bill Grigsby serving as analyst.

== Offseason ==
Sid Abel was hired as the general manager of the team on April 13, 1974, signing a three-year contract. Bep Guidolin was hired to be the coach of the team in May 1974.

=== NHL draft ===
Round	#	Player	Nationality	College/junior/club team
1	2	Wilf Paiement (RW)	Canada	St. Catharines Black Hawks (OMJHL)
2	20	Glen Burdon (C)	Canada	Regina Pats (WCHL)
3	38	Bob Bourne (C)	Canada	Saskatoon Blades (WCHL)
4	56	Roger Lemelin (D)	Canada	London Knights (OMJHL)
5	74	Mark Lomenda (RW)	Canada	Victoria Cougars (WCHL)
6	92	John Shewchuk (C)	United States	St. Paul Vulcans (MWJHL)
7	110	Mike Boland (D)	Canada	Sault Ste. Marie Greyhounds (OMJHL)
9	145	Brian Kuruliak (LW)	Canada	North Bay Trappers (OPJHL)
10	162	Denis Carufel (D)	Canada	Sorel Eperviers (QMJHL)
11	177	Soren Johansson (C)	Sweden	Djurgardens IF (Sweden)
12	191	Mats Ulander (LW)	Sweden	Bodens BK (Sweden)
13	203	Ed Pizunski (D)	Canada	Peterborough Petes (OMJHL)
14	213	Willie Wing (RW)	Canada	Hamilton Fincups (OMJHL)

=== Expansion draft ===
#	Player	Drafted from	Drafted by
1.	Michel Plasse (G)	Montreal Canadiens	Kansas City Scouts
3.	Peter McDuffe (G)	New York Rangers	Kansas City Scouts
5.	Simon Nolet (RW)	Philadelphia Flyers	Kansas City Scouts
7.	Butch Deadmarsh (LW)	Atlanta Flames	Kansas City Scouts
9.	Brent Hughes (D)	Detroit Red Wings	Kansas City Scouts
11.	Paul Terbenche (D)	Buffalo Sabres	Kansas City Scouts
13.	Gary Coalter (C)	California Golden Seals	Kansas City Scouts
15.	Gary Croteau (LW)	California Golden Seals	Kansas City Scouts
17.	Randy Rota (LW)	Los Angeles Kings	Kansas City Scouts
19.	Lynn Powis (C)	Chicago Black Hawks	Kansas City Scouts
21.	John Wright (W)	St. Louis Blues	Kansas City Scouts
23.	Ted Snell (RW)	Pittsburgh Penguins	Kansas City Scouts
25.	Chris Evans (W)	Detroit Red Wings	Kansas City Scouts
27.	Bryan Lefley (D)	New York Islanders	Kansas City Scouts
29.	Robin Burns (LW)	Pittsburgh Penguins	Kansas City Scouts
31.	Tom Peluso (W)	Chicago Black Hawks	Kansas City Scouts
33.	Kerry Ketter (D)	Atlanta Flames	Kansas City Scouts
35.	Norm Dube (W)	Los Angeles Kings	Kansas City Scouts
37.	Real Lemieux (C)	Vancouver Canucks	Kansas City Scouts
39.	Dave Hudson (C)	Vancouver Canucks	Kansas City Scouts
41.	Ken Murray (D)	Detroit Red Wings	Kansas City Scouts
43.	Dennis Patterson (D)	Minnesota North Stars	Kansas City Scouts
45.	Ed Gilbert (C)	Montreal Canadiens	Kansas City Scouts
47.	Doug Horbul (W)	New York Rangers	Kansas City Scouts

== Regular season ==
Along with the Washington Capitals, the Scouts joined the NHL as an expansion team for the 1974–75 season. With a combined 30 teams between the NHL and the rival World Hockey Association, the talent pool available to stock the new teams was extremely thin. In their first season, the Capitals would set an NHL record for futility, losing 67 of 80 games, and only winning one on the road. The Scouts fared only marginally better, and the expansion was widely seen as having been a mistake.

They played their home games at Kemper Arena. The team was not a particular success either at the gate or on the ice. Rising oil prices and a falling commodity market made for hard going in the Midwest during the 1970s.

- October 9, 1974 – The Scouts played their first game in franchise history against the Toronto Maple Leafs. The final score was 6–2 in favor of the Maple Leafs.
- November 2, 1974 – The first home game in Kansas City Scouts history was played. The opponent was the Chicago Blackhawks and the Blackhawks won the game by a score of 5–4.
- November 3, 1974 – The Scouts won their first game in franchise history by defeating their expansion brethren, the Washington Capitals by a 5–4 score.
- November 13, 1974 – The Scouts won their first home game in franchise history. The final score was 5–3 in a triumph over their cross-state rivals, the St. Louis Blues.
- December 9, 1974 – Prior to a morning practice, the team was informed that head athletic trainer Gordon Marchant had committed suicide at his farm near Plattsburg, Missouri north of Kansas City. Clinton County (Missouri) Sheriff Ray Boyd stated Marchant died of a self-inflicted gunshot to the head. Marchant's body was discovered by Scouts equipment manager James Kraus.
- January 23, 1975 – The Scouts had their biggest win of the season by defeating the Boston Bruins by a score of 3–2 in Boston. Gary Croteau's second-period goal turned out to be the game-winner. Following the game, a Boston fan attempted to attack Croteau at the Scouts' bench, but Boston police intervened.

=== Final standings ===
Smythe Division
		GP	W	L	T	GF	GA	DIFF	Pts
1	Vancouver Canucks	80	38	32	10	271	254	+17	86
2	St. Louis Blues	80	35	31	14	269	267	+2	84
3	Chicago Blackhawks	80	37	35	8	268	241	+27	82
4	Minnesota North Stars	80	23	50	7	221	341	−120	53
5	Kansas City Scouts	80	15	54	11	184	328	−144	41

=== Record vs. opponents ===
Smythe Division record vs. opponents

Vs. Campbell Conference

Vs. Wales Conference

Vs. Smythe Division

1974–75 NHL records
Team	CHI	KCS	MIN	STL	VAN	Total
Chicago	—	4–1–1	5–1	4–2	2–4	15–8–1
Kansas City	1–4–1	—	2–4	1–5	1–3–2	5–16–3
Minnesota	1–5	4–2	—	1–5	3–2–1	9–14–1
St. Louis	2–4	5–1	5–1	—	2–3–1	14–9–1
Vancouver	4–2	3–1–2	2–3–1	3–2–1	—	12–8–4

Vs. Patrick Division

1974–75 NHL records
Team	ATL	NYI	NYR	PHI	Total
Chicago	3–2	1–1–3	1–3–1	1–4	6–10–4
Kansas City	0–4–1	1–4	0–4–1	0–4–1	1–16–3
Minnesota	1–3–1	0–4–1	1–4	1–4	3–15–2
St. Louis	3–2	2–2–1	1–3–1	2–3	8–10–2
Vancouver	2–1–2	2–1–2	2–3	1–4	7–9–4

Vs. Adams Division

1974–75 NHL records
Team	BOS	BUF	CAL	TOR	Total
Chicago	2–2	1–3	3–1	2–2	8–8–0
Kansas City	1–2–1	0–4	2–1–1	1–2–1	4–9–3
Minnesota	0–3–1	1–3	3–1	1–3	5–10–1
St. Louis	2–1–1	0–2–2	2–1–1	0–2–2	4–6–6
Vancouver	1–3	2–2	4–0	3–1	10–6–0

Vs. Norris Division

1974–75 NHL records
Team	DET	LAK	MTL	PIT	WSH	Total
Chicago	2–1–1	2–2	0–3–1	1–2–1	3–1	8–9–3
Kansas City	1–3	1–3	0–4	0–2–2	3–1	5–13–2
Minnesota	2–0–2	0–4	0–4	1–3	3–0–1	6–11–3
St. Louis	3–0–1	0–3–1	2–1–1	1–1–2	4–0	10–5–5
Vancouver	3–1	1–1–2	0–4	1–3	4–0	9–9–2

== Schedule and results ==
1974–75 regular season
October

Game	Result	Date	Score	Opponent	Record
1	L	October 9, 1974	2–6	@ Toronto Maple Leafs (1974–75)	0–1–0
2	L	October 12, 1974	2–6	@ New York Islanders (1974–75)	0–2–0
3	L	October 13, 1974	2–3	@ Philadelphia Flyers (1974–75)	0–3–0
4	L	October 18, 1974	2–4	@ Atlanta Flames (1974–75)	0–4–0
5	L	October 19, 1974	0–3	@ Los Angeles Kings (1974–75)	0–5–0
6	T	October 23, 1974	4–4	@ California Golden Seals (1974–75)	0–5–1
7	L	October 25, 1974	3–5	@ Vancouver Canucks (1974–75)	0–6–1
8	L	October 27, 1974	2–8	@ Boston Bruins (1974–75)	0–7–1

November

Game	Result	Date	Score	Opponent	Record
9	L	November 2, 1974	3–4	Chicago Black Hawks (1974–75)	0–8–1
10	W	November 3, 1974	5–4	@ Washington Capitals (1974–75)	1–8–1
11	L	November 5, 1974	3–5	Pittsburgh Penguins (1974–75)	1–9–1
12	L	November 7, 1974	4–6	Vancouver Canucks (1974–75)	1–10–1
13	L	November 9, 1974	1–6	Buffalo Sabres (1974–75)	1–11–1
14	W	November 13, 1974	5–3	St. Louis Blues (1974–75)	2–11–1
15	W	November 15, 1974	4–2	New York Islanders (1974–75)	3–11–1
16	L	November 16, 1974	1–3	@ Minnesota North Stars (1974–75)	3–12–1
17	L	November 20, 1974	0–1	Atlanta Flames (1974–75)	3–13–1
18	L	November 22, 1974	6–7	Montreal Canadiens (1974–75)	3–14–1
19	L	November 23, 1974	0–6	@ Chicago Black Hawks (1974–75)	3–15–1
20	W	November 26, 1974	4–3	Vancouver Canucks (1974–75)	4–15–1
21	L	November 27, 1974	2–4	@ Atlanta Flames (1974–75)	4–16–1
22	L	November 30, 1974	0–1	Detroit Red Wings (1974–75)	4–17–1

December

Game	Result	Date	Score	Opponent	Record
23	L	December 1, 1974	0–10	@ Philadelphia Flyers (1974–75)	4–18–1
24	L	December 4, 1974	3–7	@ Chicago Black Hawks (1974–75)	4–19–1
25	T	December 6, 1974	3–3	Philadelphia Flyers (1974–75)	4–19–2
26	L	December 7, 1974	1–4	@ New York Islanders (1974–75)	4–20–2
27	L	December 10, 1974	2–6	Boston Bruins (1974–75)	4–21–2
28	W	December 12, 1974	5–3	California Golden Seals (1974–75)	5–21–2
29	T	December 14, 1974	2–2	Vancouver Canucks (1974–75)	5–21–3
30	L	December 18, 1974	0–6	Los Angeles Kings (1974–75)	5–22–3
31	T	December 19, 1974	4–4	@ Pittsburgh Penguins (1974–75)	5–22–4
32	L	December 21, 1974	4–6	@ St. Louis Blues (1974–75)	5–23–4
33	L	December 22, 1974	2–5	New York Islanders (1974–75)	5–24–4
34	L	December 28, 1974	2–7	@ Montreal Canadiens (1974–75)	5–25–4
35	L	December 29, 1974	1–2	@ New York Rangers (1974–75)	5–26–4

January

Game	Result	Date	Score	Opponent	Record
36	L	January 2, 1975	1–2	St. Louis Blues (1974–75)	5–27–4
37	W	January 4, 1975	2–1	Detroit Red Wings (1974–75)	6–27–4
38	W	January 6, 1975	5–2	Minnesota North Stars (1974–75)	7–27–4
39	L	January 8, 1975	1–6	New York Rangers (1974–75)	7–28–4
40	W	January 11, 1975	5–3	Washington Capitals (1974–75)	8–28–4
41	L	January 14, 1975	4–6	Philadelphia Flyers (1974–75)	8–29–4
42	L	January 16, 1975	4–7	@ Detroit Red Wings (1974–75)	8–30–4
43	W	January 18, 1975	4–1	Chicago Black Hawks (1974–75)	9–30–4
44	L	January 19, 1975	0–5	@ Buffalo Sabres (1974–75)	9–31–4
45	W	January 23, 1975	3–2	@ Boston Bruins (1974–75)	10–31–4
46	L	January 25, 1975	1–4	@ Minnesota North Stars (1974–75)	10–32–4
47	T	January 27, 1975	3–3	Boston Bruins (1974–75)	10–32–5
48	T	January 29, 1975	4–4	Atlanta Flames (1974–75)	10–32–6

February

Game	Result	Date	Score	Opponent	Record
49	L	February 1, 1975	2–3	Minnesota North Stars (1974–75)	10–33–6
50	L	February 2, 1975	1–8	@ Buffalo Sabres (1974–75)	10–34–6
51	T	February 4, 1975	3–3	Chicago Black Hawks (1974–75)	10–34–7
52	W	February 6, 1975	3–2	Toronto Maple Leafs (1974–75)	11–34–7
53	L	February 7, 1975	0–5	@ St. Louis Blues (1974–75)	11–35–7
54	W	February 9, 1975	2–1	@ California Golden Seals (1974–75)	12–35–7
55	L	February 11, 1975	0–4	@ Vancouver Canucks (1974–75)	12–36–7
56	W	February 13, 1975	5–1	Washington Capitals (1974–75)	13–36–7
57	L	February 15, 1975	0–3	California Golden Seals (1974–75)	13–37–7
58	L	February 16, 1975	0–3	@ Washington Capitals (1974–75)	13–38–7
59	T	February 18, 1975	2–2	New York Rangers (1974–75)	13–38–8
60	L	February 20, 1975	3–6	Montreal Canadiens (1974–75)	13–39–8
61	W	February 23, 1975	4–2	Minnesota North Stars (1974–75)	14–39–8
62	L	February 26, 1975	2–4	@ Toronto Maple Leafs (1974–75)	14–40–8

March

Game	Result	Date	Score	Opponent	Record
63	L	March 1, 1975	0–3	@ Philadelphia Flyers (1974–75)	14–41–8
64	L	March 2, 1975	0–4	@ Atlanta Flames (1974–75)	14–42–8
65	L	March 4, 1975	4–7	@ Los Angeles Kings (1974–75)	14–43–8
66	T	March 5, 1975	4–4	Pittsburgh Penguins (1974–75)	14–43–9
67	L	March 7, 1975	2–5	New York Rangers (1974–75)	14–44–9
68	L	March 8, 1975	1–5	@ Detroit Red Wings (1974–75)	14–45–9
69	T	March 11, 1975	3–3	@ Vancouver Canucks (1974–75)	14–45–10
70	L	March 14, 1975	1–6	@ St. Louis Blues (1974–75)	14–46–10
71	L	March 16, 1975	3–6	@ Pittsburgh Penguins (1974–75)	14–47–10
72	L	March 19, 1975	1–3	New York Islanders (1974–75)	14–48–10
73	L	March 22, 1975	2–4	Buffalo Sabres (1974–75)	14–49–10
74	L	March 25, 1975	1–2	@ Minnesota North Stars (1974–75)	14–50–10
75	T	March 26, 1975	2–2	Toronto Maple Leafs (1974–75)	14–50–11
76	L	March 29, 1975	1–4	@ Montreal Canadiens (1974–75)	14–51–11
77	L	March 30, 1975	2–8	@ New York Rangers (1974–75)	14–52–11

April

Game	Result	Date	Score	Opponent	Record
78	W	April 1, 1975	3–1	Los Angeles Kings (1974–75)	15–52–11
79	L	April 3, 1975	4–6	@ Chicago Black Hawks (1974–75)	15–53–11
80	L	April 6, 1975	2–3	St. Louis Blues (1974–75)	15–54–11

Legend: Win (2 points) Loss (0 points) Tie (1 point)

== Player statistics ==
=== Forwards ===
Note: GP = Games played; G = Goals; A = Assists; Pts = Points; PIM = Penalty minutes

Player	GP	G	A	Pts	PIM
Simon Nolet	72	26	32	58	30
Guy Charron	51	13	29	42	21
Dave Hudson	70	9	32	41	27
Wilf Paiement	78	26	13	39	101
Ed Gilbert	80	16	22	38	14
Robin Burns	71	18	15	33	70
Randy Rota	80	15	18	33	30
Lynn Powis	73	11	20	31	19
Gary Croteau	77	8	11	19	16
Norm Dube	56	8	10	18	54
Gary Coalter	30	2	4	6	2
Butch Deadmarsh	20	3	2	5	19
Ted Snell	29	3	2	5	8
Doug Buhr	6	0	2	2	4
Doug Horbul	4	1	0	1	2
Hugh Harvey	8	0	0	0	2

=== Defensemen ===
Note: GP = Games played; G = Goals; A = Assists; Pts = Points; PIM = Penalty minutes

Player	GP	G	A	Pts	PIM
Jim McElmury	78	5	17	22	25
Brent Hughes	66	1	18	19	43
Jean-Guy Lagace	19	2	9	11	22
Bart Crashley	27	3	6	9	10
Claude Houde	34	3	4	7	20
Larry Johnston	14	0	7	7	10
Larry Giroux	21	0	6	6	24
Dennis Patterson	66	1	5	6	39
Bryan Lefley	29	0	3	3	6
Glen Burdon	11	0	2	2	0
Chris Evans	2	0	2	2	2
Ken Murray	8	0	2	2	14
Roger Lemelin	8	0	1	1	6
Mike Baumgartner	17	0	0	0	0
Mike Boland	1	0	0	0	0
Hank Lehvonen	4	0	0	0	0

=== Goaltending ===
Note: GP = Games played; W = Wins; L = Losses; T = Ties; SO = Shutouts; GAA = Goals against average

Player	GP	W	L	T	SO	GAA
Denis Herron	22	4	13	4	0	3.75
Peter McDuffe	36	7	25	4	0	4.23
Michel Plasse	24	4	16	3	0	4.06

== Transactions ==
=== Trades ===
August 22, 1974	To Montreal Canadiens cash	To Kansas City Scouts Mike Baumgartner
September 1, 1974	To Atlanta Flames cash	To Kansas City Scouts Morris Stefaniw
September 10, 1974	To New York Islanders Bob Bourne	To Kansas City Scouts Larry Hornung; Bart Crashley
October 29, 1974	To St. Louis Blues Chris Evans; Kansas City's 4th round draft pick 1976 NHL entry draft	To Kansas City Scouts Larry Giroux
December 1, 1974	To Vancouver Blazers (WHA) Butch Deadmarsh	To Kansas City Scouts cash
December 14, 1974	To Detroit Red Wings Bart Crashley; Ted Snell; Larry Giroux	To Kansas City Scouts Guy Charron; Claude Houde
January 10, 1975	To Pittsburgh Penguins Michel Plasse	To Kansas City Scouts Jean-Guy Lagace; Denis Herron
February 1, 1975	To Los Angeles Kings cash	To Kansas City Scouts Doug Buhr
February 10, 1975	To Los Angeles Kings Ken Murray	To Kansas City Scouts cash
June 3, 1975	To Toronto Maple Leafs Kansas City's 12th round pick 1975 NHL entry draft	To Kansas City Scouts cash
June 18, 1975	To St. Louis Blues Lynn Powis; Kansas City's 2nd round pick 1975 NHL entry draft	To Kansas City Scouts Craig Patrick; Denis Dupere cash
