= List of Kansas City Scouts players =

This is a complete list of ice hockey players who played for the National Hockey League (NHL) team Kansas City Scouts. It includes all fifty players who played for the Scouts. The Scouts never got into the playoffs while in Kansas City.

This list does not include data from the Colorado Rockies and the New Jersey Devils. The seasons column lists the season of the player's first game and the season of the player's last game.

== Key ==
Abbreviations
C	Center
D	Defenseman
L	Left wing
R	Right wing

Goaltenders
W	Wins
L	Losses
T	Ties
SO	Shutouts
GAA	Goals against average
SV%	Save percentage

Skaters
GP	Games played
G	Goals
A	Assists
Pts	Points
PIM	Penalty minutes

The "Seasons" column lists the first year of the season of the player's first game and the last year of the season of the player's last game. For example, a player who played one game in the 2000–2001 season would be listed as playing with the team from 2000–2001, regardless of what calendar year the game occurred within.

== Skaters ==
			Regular season				
Player	Pos	Years	GP	G	A	Pts	PIM
Chuck Arnason	R	1975–1976	39	14	10	24	21
Mike Baumgartner	D	1974–1975	17	0	0	0	0
Gary Bergman	D	1975–1976	75	5	33	38	82
Michael Boland	D	1974–1975	1	0	0	0	0
Henry Boucha	C	1975–1976	28	4	7	11	14
Doug Buhr	L	1974–1975	6	0	2	2	4
Glen Burdon	C	1974–1975	11	0	2	2	0
Robin Burns	L	1974–1976	149	31	33	64	107
Don Cairns	L	1975–1976	7	0	0	0	0
Guy Charron	C	1974–1976	129	40	73	113	33
Gary Coalter	R	1974–1975	30	2	4	6	2
Bart Crashley	D	1974–1975	27	3	6	9	10
Gary Croteau	R	1974–1976	156	27	25	52	28
Butch Deadmarsh	L	1974–1975	20	3	2	5	19
Normand Dube	L	1974–1976	57	8	10	18	54
Denis Dupere	L	1975–1976	43	6	8	14	16
Steve Durbano	D	1975–1976	37	1	11	12	209
Christopher Evans	D	1974–1975	2	0	2	2	2
Germain Gagnon	L	1975–1976	31	1	9	10	6
Ed Gilbert	C	1974–1976	121	20	30	50	22
Larry Giroux	D	1974–1975	21	0	6	6	24
Buster Harvey	R	1975–1976	39	5	12	17	6
Hugh Harvey	C	1974–1976	18	1	1	2	4
Doug Horbul	L	1974–1975	4	1	0	1	2
Claude Houde	D	1974–1976	59	3	6	9	40
Dave Hudson	C	1974–1976	144	20	52	72	39
Brent Hughes	D	1974–1975	66	1	18	19	43
Larry Johnston	D	1974–1976	88	2	17	19	122
Jean-Guy Lagace	D	1974–1976	88	5	19	24	130
Bryan Lefley	D	1974–1975	29	0	3	3	6
Henry Lehvonen	D	1974–1975	4	0	0	0	0
Roger Lemelin	D	1974–1976	19	0	1	1	6
Rich Lemieux	C	1974–1976	81	10	20	30	64
Terry McDonald	D	1975–1976	8	0	1	1	6
Jim McElmury	D	1974–1976	116	7	23	30	31
Ken Murray	D	1974–1976	31	0	4	4	38
Simon Nolet	R	1974–1976	113	36	47	83	46
Wilf Paiement	R	1974–1976	135	47	35	82	222
Craig Patrick	R	1975–1976	80	17	18	35	14
Dennis Patterson	D	1974–1976	135	6	21	27	67
Lynn Powis	C	1974–1975	73	11	20	31	19
Phil Roberto	R	1975–1976	37	7	15	22	42
Randy Rota	C	1974–1976	151	27	32	59	44
Ted Snell	R	1974–1975	29	3	2	5	8
John Wright	C	1974–1975	4	0	0	0	2

== Goaltenders ==
		Regular season						
Player	Years	GP	W	L	T	SO	GAA	SV%
Denis Herron	1974–1976	86	15	52	15	0	3.96	—
Peter McDuffe	1974–1975	36	7	25	4	0	4.23	—
William McKenzie	1975–1976	22	1	16	1	0	5.20	—
William Oleschuk	1975–1976	1	0	1	0	0	4.00	—
Michel Plasse	1974–1975	24	4	16	3	0	4.06	—

== See also ==
- List of NHL players
