= 1974–75 NHL transactions =

The following is a list of all team-to-team transactions that occurred in the National Hockey League during the 1974–75 NHL season. It lists what team each player was traded to, signed by, or claimed by, and for which players or draft picks, if applicable.

== May ==
May 21, 1974	To Buffalo Sabres 3rd-round pick - 1975 Amateur Draft (# 44 - Terry Martin)	To Atlanta Flames rights to Jim McMasters
May 23, 1974	To California Golden Seals Mike Christie; Len Frig	To Chicago Black Hawks Ivan Boldirev
May 24, 1974	To California Golden Seals Al MacAdam; Larry Wright; 1st-round pick - 1974 Amateur Draft (# 17 - Ron Chipperfield)	To Philadelphia Flyers Reggie Leach
May 27, 1974	To Detroit Red Wings Hank Nowak; 3rd-round pick - 1974 Amateur Draft (# 44 - Dan Mandryk)	To Pittsburgh Penguins Nelson Debenedet
May 27, 1974	To Pittsburgh Penguins Vic Hadfield	To New York Rangers Nick Beverley
May 27, 1974	To Minnesota North Stars John Flesch; Don Martineau	To Atlanta Flames Jerry Byers; Buster Harvey
May 27, 1974	To Toronto Maple Leafs Gary Sabourin	To St. Louis Blues Eddie Johnston
May 27, 1974	To Toronto Maple Leafs Bill Flett	To Philadelphia Flyers Dave Fortier; Randy Osburn
May 27, 1974	To Montreal Canadiens Mike Baumgartner	To Atlanta Flames cash
May 27, 1974	To Montreal Canadiens 4th-round pick - 1974 Amateur Draft (# 61 - Barry Legge) future considerations^{1} (Glen Sather)	To St. Louis Blues Rick Wilson; 5th-round pick - 1974 Amateur Draft (# 87 - Don Wheldon)

1. Trade completed on June 14, 1974.

== June ==
June 12, 1974	To Boston Bruins Walt McKechnie	To New York Rangers Derek Sanderson
June 20, 1974	To Atlanta Flames cash	To Washington Capitals Doug Mohns

== July ==
July 18, 1974	To California Golden Seals Glenn Patrick	To St. Louis Blues Ron Serafini
July 18, 1974	To California Golden Seals John Stewart	To Atlanta Flames Hilliard Graves
July 22, 1974	To Boston Bruins cash	To Washington Capitals Tom Williams
July 28, 1974	To Los Angeles Kings cash	To Washington Capitals Bill Lesuk
July 29, 1974	To Washington Capitals Andre Peloffy	To New York Rangers cash

== August ==
August 22, 1974	To Montreal Canadiens cash	To Kansas City Scouts Mike Baumgartner
August 27, 1974	To Minnesota North Stars Henry Boucha	To Detroit Red Wings Danny Grant
August 29, 1974	To St. Louis Blues Larry Sacharuk; 1st-round pick - 1977 Amateur Draft (NYR - # 8 - Lucien DeBlois)^{1}	To New York Rangers Greg Polis

1. Rangers' first-round pick was re-acquired as the result of a trade on October 30, 1975, that sent Derek Sanderson to St. Louis in exchange for this pick.

== September ==
September 10, 1974	To Kansas City Scouts rights to Larry Hornung future considerations^{1} (Bart Crashley)	To New York Islanders Bob Bourne
September 13, 1974	To Toronto Maple Leafs Blaine Stoughton; 1st-round pick - 1977 Amateur Draft (# 12 - Trevor Johansen)	To Pittsburgh Penguins Rick Kehoe
September 15, 1974	To Buffalo Sabres Jacques Caron	To Vancouver Canucks future considerations
September 16, 1974	To St. Louis Blues rights to Randy Andreachuk; 2nd-round pick - 1975 Amateur Draft (# 36 - Jamie Masters)	To Philadelphia Flyers Wayne Stephenson
September 16, 1974	To St. Louis Blues cash	To Philadelphia Flyers Ted Harris
September 17, 1974	To Kansas City Scouts Morris Stefaniw	To Atlanta Flames cash
September 23, 1974	To California Golden Seals Brian Lavender	To New York Rangers Hartland Monahan

1. Trade completed on September 16, 1974.

== October ==
October 1, 1974	To Minnesota North Stars 3nd-round pick - 1975 Amateur Draft (# 41 - Alex Pirus)	To Detroit Red Wings Gary Bergman
October 4, 1974	To Vancouver Canucks Leon Rochefort	To Atlanta Flames cash
October 14, 1974	To Buffalo Sabres Jocelyn Guevremont; Bryan McSheffrey	To Vancouver Canucks Gerry Meehan; Mike Robitaille
October 16, 1974	To Toronto Maple Leafs Dave Dunn	To Vancouver Canucks John Grisdale; Garry Monahan
October 29, 1974	To Kansas City Scouts Larry Giroux	To St. Louis Blues Chris Evans; 4th-round pick - 1976 Amateur Draft (# 56 - Mike Liut)

== November ==
November 2, 1974	To Toronto Maple Leafs Rod Seiling	To Washington Capitals Willie Brossart; Tim Ecclestone
November 2, 1974	To Atlanta Flames Tim Ecclestone	To Washington Capitals cash
November 4, 1974	To Vancouver Canucks Ab DeMarco Jr.	To Pittsburgh Penguins Barry Wilkins
November 11, 1974	To California Golden Seals Dave Gardner; Butch Williams	To St. Louis Blues Stan Gilbertson; Craig Patrick
November 28, 1974	To Montreal Canadiens Don Awrey	To St. Louis Blues Chuck Lefley

== December ==
December 5, 1974	To Montreal Canadiens cash	To St. Louis Blues Claude Larose
December 11, 1974	To California Golden Seals George Pesut	To Philadelphia Flyers rights to Ron Chipperfield
December 14, 1974	To Kansas City Scouts Guy Charron; Claude Houde	To Detroit Red Wings Bart Crashley; Larry Giroux; Ted Snell
December 14, 1974	To Washington Capitals Ron Lalonde	To Pittsburgh Penguins Lew Morrison
December 30, 1974	To St. Louis Blues Red Berenson	To Detroit Red Wings Phil Roberto; 3rd-round pick - 1975 Amateur Draft (# 45 - Blair Davidson)

== January ==
January 3, 1975	To Minnesota North Stars Dwight Bialowas; Dean Talafous	To Atlanta Flames Barry Gibbs
January 5, 1975	To Minnesota North Stars Ernie Hicke; Doug Rombough	To New York Islanders Jean-Paul Parise
January 5, 1975	To Minnesota North Stars Bob Cook	To New York Islanders cash
January 7, 1975	To Minnesota North Stars Craig Cameron	To New York Islanders Jude Drouin
January 9, 1975	To California Golden Seals Frank Spring	To St. Louis Blues Bruce Affleck
January 10, 1975	To Kansas City Scouts Denis Herron; Jean-Guy Lagace	To Pittsburgh Penguins Michel Plasse
January 20, 1975	To St. Louis Blues Bernie Lukowich	To Pittsburgh Penguins Bob Stumpf
January 21, 1975	To Washington Capitals Ron Jones	To Pittsburgh Penguins Pete Laframboise
January 27, 1975	To Buffalo Sabres Fred Stanfield	To Minnesota North Stars Norm Gratton; 3rd-round pick - 1976 Amateur Draft (# 51 - Ron Zanussi)

== February ==
February, 1975 exact date unknown	To Kansas City Scouts Doug Buhr	To Los Angeles Kings cash
February 8, 1975	To Detroit Red Wings Dave Kryskow	To Washington Capitals Jack Lynch
February 10, 1975	To Kansas City Scouts cash	To Los Angeles Kings Ken Murray
February 10, 1975	To St. Louis Blues Denis Dupere	To Washington Capitals Garnet Bailey; Stan Gilbertson
February 18, 1975	To Boston Bruins Earl Anderson; Hank Nowak	To Detroit Red Wings Walt McKechnie; 3rd-round pick - 1975 Amateur Draft (# 50 - Clark Hamilton)
February 19, 1975	To Buffalo Sabres rights to Gerry Desjardins	To New York Islanders rights to Garry Lariviere; 3rd-round pick - 1977 Amateur Draft (# 50 - Hector Marini)
February 28, 1975	To Detroit Red Wings 3rd-round pick - 1975 Amateur Draft (# 37 - Al Cameron)	To Washington Capitals Nelson Pyatt

== March ==
March 9, 1975	To Detroit Red Wings Mike Bloom	To Washington Capitals Blair Stewart
March 9, 1975	To Vancouver Canucks Bob Murray	To Atlanta Flames Gerry Meehan
March 10, 1975	To Buffalo Sabres Al Smith	To Detroit Red Wings future considerations
March 10, 1975	To Los Angeles Kings cash	To St. Louis Blues Jim McCrimmon
