= 1974–75 Los Angeles Kings season =

National Hockey League team season

1974–75 Los Angeles Kings
- Division: 2nd Norris
- Conference: 3rd Wales
- 1974–75 record: 42–17–21
- Home record: 22–7–11
- Road record: 20–10–10
- Goals for: 269
- Goals against: 185

Team information
- General manager: Jake Milford
- Coach: Bob Pulford
- Captain: Terry Harper
- Alternate captains: Dan Maloney; Juha Widing
- Arena: Los Angeles Forum

Team leaders
- Goals: Bob Nevin (31)
- Assists: Bob Nevin (41)
- Points: Bob Nevin (72)
- Penalty minutes: Dan Maloney (165)
- Wins: Rogie Vachon (14)
- Goals against average: Rogie Vachon (2.24)

The 1974–75 Los Angeles Kings season was the Kings' eighth season in the National Hockey League (NHL).

== Offseason ==
Defenseman Barry Long (3G, 19Ast, plus/minus = +25) jumped to the Edmonton Oilers of the WHA.

== Regular season ==
The Kings were coming off their first playoff appearance in 5 years and the season before finished with a .500 record and scored more goals than they allowed for the first time in club history. Still, they were placed in a division with the powerful Montreal Canadiens in the 1974–75 realignment and hockey experts joked that Montreal would clinch 1st place by Christmas. But the Kings started fast, losing only twice in their first 26 games. The Canadiens finally overtook them and clinched first place with only 3 games to play. In addition, the Kings had allowed the fewest goals in for most of the season (which would have earned their goaltender tandem of Rogie Vachon and Gary Edwards the Vezina Trophy under 1975 rules). But they faltered just enough at the end and the Philadelphia Flyers earned that honor by a mere 4 goals.

== Playoffs ==
With the 4th best record in the league, the Kings were hopeful of a deep playoff run. But because they finished 2nd in the division, they had to play in the dangerous 2 out of 3 mini series. Their opponent was the Toronto Maple Leafs, who were under .500 on the season, finishing 27 points behind the Kings. But a hot goalie can carry a team and Toronto's Gord McRae got hot at the wrong time for the Kings. Toronto scored a late goal in game 1 but the Kings won in overtime, 3–2. Toronto won game 2 in overtime by the same 3–2 score, and won game 3 in L.A. 2–1. Three of the four higher seeded teams lost in the mini series.

=== Final standings ===
Norris Division
		GP	W	L	T	GF	GA	DIFF	Pts
1	Montreal Canadiens	80	47	14	19	374	225	+149	113
2	Los Angeles Kings	80	42	17	21	269	185	+84	105
3	Pittsburgh Penguins	80	37	28	15	326	289	+37	89
4	Detroit Red Wings	80	23	45	12	259	335	−76	58
5	Washington Capitals	80	8	67	5	181	446	−265	21

=== Record vs. opponents ===
Norris Division record vs. opponents

Vs. Wales Conference

Vs. Campbell Conference

Vs. Norris Division

1974–75 NHL records
Team	DET	LAK	MTL	PIT	WSH	Total
Detroit	—	0–5–1	0–4–2	2–4	5–1	7–14–3
Los Angeles	5–0–1	—	1–2–3	3–1–2	5–0–1	14–3–7
Montreal	4–0–2	2–1–3	—	4–1–1	6–0	16–2–6
Pittsburgh	4–2	1–3–2	1–4–1	—	5–1	11–10–3
Washington	1–5	0–5–1	0–6	1–5	—	2–21–1

Vs. Adams Division

1974–75 NHL records
Team	BOS	BUF	CAL	TOR	Total
Detroit	1–4	1–3–1	2–2–1	1–3–1	5–12–3
Los Angeles	3–2	3–1–1	2–1–2	4–0–1	12–4–4
Montreal	3–0–2	0–4–1	5–0	1–2–2	9–6–5
Pittsburgh	1–2–2	0–3–2	4–0–1	4–1	9–6–5
Washington	0–4–1	0–5	2–3	1–4	3–16–1

Vs. Patrick Division

1974–75 NHL records
Team	ATL	NYI	NYR	PHI	Total
Detroit	2–2	2–2	1–2–1	1–2–1	6–8–2
Los Angeles	1–2–1	0–1–3	1–1–2	1–2–1	3–6–7
Montreal	3–0–1	0–2–2	2–0–2	1–2–1	6–4–6
Pittsburgh	1–1–2	2–2	2–2	1–3	6–8–2
Washington	0–3–1	0–4	1–2–1	0–4	1–13–2

Vs. Smythe Division

1974–75 NHL records
Team	CHI	KCS	MIN	STL	VAN	Total
Detroit	1–2–1	3–1	0–2–2	0–3–1	1–3	5–11–4
Los Angeles	2–2	3–1	4–0	3–0–1	1–1–2	13–4–3
Montreal	3–0–1	4–0	4–0	1–2–1	4–0	16–2–2
Pittsburgh	2–1–1	2–0–2	3–1	1–1–2	3–1	11–4–5
Washington	1–3	1–3	0–3–1	0–4	0–4	2–17–1

== Schedule and results ==
1974–75 regular season
October

Game	Result	Date	Score	Opponent	Record
1	W	October 10, 1974	5–3	@ Philadelphia Flyers (1974–75)	1–0–0
2	T	October 12, 1974	4–4	@ Montreal Canadiens (1974–75)	1–0–1
3	W	October 13, 1974	4–1	@ Buffalo Sabres (1974–75)	2–0–1
4	T	October 15, 1974	1–1	@ Washington Capitals (1974–75)	2–0–2
5	T	October 16, 1974	1–1	@ Toronto Maple Leafs (1974–75)	2–0–3
6	W	October 19, 1974	3–0	Kansas City Scouts (1974–75)	3–0–3
7	L	October 22, 1974	2–4	Philadelphia Flyers (1974–75)	3–1–3
8	W	October 24, 1974	7–2	Buffalo Sabres (1974–75)	4–1–3
9	W	October 26, 1974	5–1	California Golden Seals (1974–75)	5–1–3
10	W	October 28, 1974	2–0	Pittsburgh Penguins (1974–75)	6–1–3
11	T	October 31, 1974	1–1	St. Louis Blues (1974–75)	6–1–4

November

Game	Result	Date	Score	Opponent	Record
12	W	November 2, 1974	5–1	Detroit Red Wings (1974–75)	7–1–4
13	W	November 5, 1974	4–3	@ St. Louis Blues (1974–75)	8–1–4
14	W	November 7, 1974	5–3	@ Pittsburgh Penguins (1974–75)	9–1–4
15	T	November 9, 1974	2–2	New York Rangers (1974–75)	9–1–5
16	W	November 13, 1974	4–0	Toronto Maple Leafs (1974–75)	10–1–5
17	T	November 15, 1974	2–2	@ Vancouver Canucks (1974–75)	10–1–6
18	L	November 16, 1974	1–2	Chicago Black Hawks (1974–75)	10–2–6
19	T	November 20, 1974	3–3	Montreal Canadiens (1974–75)	10–2–7
20	T	November 23, 1974	0–0	@ Pittsburgh Penguins (1974–75)	10–2–8
21	W	November 24, 1974	4–1	@ Detroit Red Wings (1974–75)	11–2–8
22	T	November 27, 1974	3–3	New York Islanders (1974–75)	11–2–9
23	W	November 30, 1974	2–0	Boston Bruins (1974–75)	12–2–9

December

Game	Result	Date	Score	Opponent	Record
24	W	December 4, 1974	4–1	Minnesota North Stars (1974–75)	13–2–9
25	W	December 7, 1974	6–2	Atlanta Flames (1974–75)	14–2–9
26	W	December 11, 1974	4–1	@ Toronto Maple Leafs (1974–75)	15–2–9
27	L	December 12, 1974	1–8	@ Boston Bruins (1974–75)	15–3–9
28	L	December 14, 1974	0–3	@ New York Islanders (1974–75)	15–4–9
29	T	December 15, 1974	3–3	@ New York Rangers (1974–75)	15–4–10
30	W	December 18, 1974	6–0	@ Kansas City Scouts (1974–75)	16–4–10
31	W	December 19, 1974	4–1	Washington Capitals (1974–75)	17–4–10
32	T	December 21, 1974	2–2	Montreal Canadiens (1974–75)	17–4–11
33	W	December 26, 1974	5–1	Vancouver Canucks (1974–75)	18–4–11
34	L	December 28, 1974	2–3	California Golden Seals (1974–75)	18–5–11
35	W	December 30, 1974	3–2	@ Detroit Red Wings (1974–75)	19–5–11
36	W	December 31, 1974	3–1	@ Chicago Black Hawks (1974–75)	20–5–11

January

Game	Result	Date	Score	Opponent	Record
37	L	January 2, 1975	2–5	Boston Bruins (1974–75)	20–6–11
38	T	January 4, 1975	2–2	Philadelphia Flyers (1974–75)	20–6–12
39	W	January 8, 1975	4–2	@ Minnesota North Stars (1974–75)	21–6–12
40	W	January 9, 1975	5–2	@ Buffalo Sabres (1974–75)	22–6–12
41	W	January 11, 1975	7–5	@ Toronto Maple Leafs (1974–75)	23–6–12
42	W	January 14, 1975	6–2	@ Washington Capitals (1974–75)	24–6–12
43	W	January 16, 1975	4–1	@ Boston Bruins (1974–75)	25–6–12
44	L	January 17, 1975	0–5	@ Atlanta Flames (1974–75)	25–7–12
45	W	January 19, 1975	6–3	@ Montreal Canadiens (1974–75)	26–7–12
46	W	January 23, 1975	8–0	Toronto Maple Leafs (1974–75)	27–7–12
47	T	January 25, 1975	5–5	@ New York Islanders (1974–75)	27–7–13
48	L	January 26, 1975	2–3	@ New York Rangers (1974–75)	27–8–13
49	W	January 28, 1975	5–2	New York Rangers (1974–75)	28–8–13
50	W	January 30, 1975	6–4	Washington Capitals (1974–75)	29–8–13

February

Game	Result	Date	Score	Opponent	Record
51	L	February 1, 1975	3–5	Montreal Canadiens (1974–75)	29–9–13
52	L	February 5, 1975	2–3	Pittsburgh Penguins (1974–75)	29–10–13
53	L	February 7, 1975	1–3	@ Atlanta Flames (1974–75)	29–11–13
54	W	February 9, 1975	2–1	@ Chicago Black Hawks (1974–75)	30–11–13
55	T	February 12, 1975	2–2	Atlanta Flames (1974–75)	30–11–14
56	W	February 15, 1975	8–2	Detroit Red Wings (1974–75)	31–11–14
57	W	February 18, 1975	6–1	@ Washington Capitals (1974–75)	32–11–14
58	T	February 19, 1975	2–2	@ Pittsburgh Penguins (1974–75)	32–11–15
59	W	February 22, 1975	6–0	Boston Bruins (1974–75)	33–11–15
60	T	February 23, 1975	2–2	@ California Golden Seals (1974–75)	33–11–16
61	W	February 26, 1975	2–1	@ Detroit Red Wings (1974–75)	34–11–16
62	L	February 27, 1975	0–5	@ Buffalo Sabres (1974–75)	34–12–16

March

Game	Result	Date	Score	Opponent	Record
63	W	March 1, 1975	7–4	Minnesota North Stars (1974–75)	35–12–16
64	W	March 4, 1975	7–4	Kansas City Scouts (1974–75)	36–12–16
65	T	March 6, 1975	2–2	New York Islanders (1974–75)	36–12–17
66	L	March 8, 1975	1–6	Chicago Black Hawks (1974–75)	36–13–17
67	T	March 11, 1975	2–2	Buffalo Sabres (1974–75)	36–13–18
68	T	March 13, 1975	5–5	Detroit Red Wings (1974–75)	36–13–19
69	L	March 15, 1975	0–3	@ Montreal Canadiens (1974–75)	36–14–19
70	L	March 16, 1975	0–3	@ Philadelphia Flyers (1974–75)	36–15–19
71	W	March 18, 1975	5–3	@ Minnesota North Stars (1974–75)	37–15–19
72	W	March 20, 1975	3–2	St. Louis Blues (1974–75)	38–15–19
73	W	March 22, 1975	4–0	Pittsburgh Penguins (1974–75)	39–15–19
74	W	March 26, 1975	5–1	Washington Capitals (1974–75)	40–15–19
75	L	March 28, 1975	2–4	@ Vancouver Canucks (1974–75)	40–16–19
76	T	March 29, 1975	3–3	Vancouver Canucks (1974–75)	40–16–20

April

Game	Result	Date	Score	Opponent	Record
77	L	April 1, 1975	1–3	@ Kansas City Scouts (1974–75)	40–17–20
78	W	April 2, 1975	5–2	@ St. Louis Blues (1974–75)	41–17–20
79	W	April 5, 1975	5–3	California Golden Seals (1974–75)	42–17–20
80	T	April 6, 1975	1–1	@ California Golden Seals (1974–75)	42–17–21

Legend: Win (2 points) Loss (0 points) Tie (1 point)

== Playoffs ==
- Maple Leafs 2 at Kings 3 (OT)
- Kings 2 at Maple Leafs 3 (OT)
- Maple Leafs 2 at Kings 1

== Awards and records ==
Jack Adams Award – Bob Pulford, Coach

All-NHL 2nd team – Rogie Vachon, Goalie

== Transactions ==
The Kings were involved in the following transactions during the 1974–75 season.

=== Trades ===
July 28, 1974	To Los Angeles Kings Cash	To Washington Capitals Bill Lesuk
February 5, 1975	To Los Angeles Kings Cash	To Kansas City Scouts Doug Buhr
February 10, 1975	To Los Angeles Kings Ken Murray	To Kansas City Scouts Cash
March 3, 1975	To Los Angeles Kings Bill Mikkelson	To Washington Capitals Cash
March 10, 1975	To Los Angeles Kings Cash	To St. Louis Blues Jim McCrimmon

=== Free agent signings ===
June 10, 1974	From Vancouver Blazers (WHA) Dave Hutchison
July 9, 1974	From Michigan Tech Huskies (NCAA) Lorne Stamler
August 1, 1974	From Ohio State Buckeyes (NCAA) Jim Witherspoon

=== Free agents lost ===
June 27, 1974	To Kansas City Scouts Jim McElmury

=== Expansion draft ===
June 12, 1974	To Washington Capitals Gord Smith
June 12, 1974	To Kansas City Scouts Norm Dubé
June 12, 1974	To Kansas City Scouts Randy Rota

== Draft picks ==
Los Angeles's draft picks at the 1974 NHL amateur draft held in Montreal.

Round	#	Player	Nationality	College/Junior/Club team (League)
3	48	Gary Sargent	United States	Fargo Sugar Kings (MWJHL)
4	66	Brad Winton	Canada	Toronto Marlboros (OMJHL)
5	84	Paul Evans	Canada	Kitchener Rangers (OMJHL)
6	102	Marty Matthews	Canada	Flin Flon Bombers (WCHL)
7	120	Harvey Stewart	Canada	Flin Flon Bombers (WCHL)
8	137	John Held	Canada	London Knights (OMJHL)
9	154	Mario Lessard	Canada	Sherbrooke Castors (QMJHL)
10	169	Derrick Emerson	Canada	Montreal Bleu Blanc Rouge (QMJHL)
11	184	Jacques Locas	Canada	Quebec Remparts (QMJHL)
12	197	Lindsay Thomson	Canada	University of Denver (WCHA)
13	207	Craig Brickley	United States	University of Pennsylvania (ECAC)
14	217	Brad Kuglin	Canada	University of Pennsylvania (ECAC)

== See also ==
- 1974–75 NHL season
