= 1974–75 Vancouver Canucks season =

5th season in franchise history

1974–75 Vancouver Canucks
- Smythe Division champions
- Division: 1st Smythe
- Conference: 4th Campbell
- 1974–75 record: 38–32–10
- Home record: 23–12–5
- Road record: 15–20–5
- Goals for: 271
- Goals against: 254

Team information
- General manager: Phil Maloney
- Coach: Phil Maloney
- Captain: Vacant
- Alternate captains: Andre Boudrias; Barry Wilkins; Chris Oddleifson; Jocelyn Guevremont; Mike Robitaille; Dennis Kearns
- Arena: Pacific Coliseum
- Average attendance: 15,630

Team leaders
- Goals: Don Lever (38)
- Assists: Andre Boudrias (62)
- Points: Andre Boudrias (78)
- Penalty minutes: Tracy Pratt (145)
- Wins: Gary Smith (32)
- Goals against average: Gary Smith (3.09)

The 1974–75 Vancouver Canucks season was the team's 5th in the NHL. With a realignment of the teams in the NHL, the Canucks left the East Division and joined the newly formed Smythe Division. The Canucks won their first division title under this new alignment, and as a result reached the playoffs for the first time. The Canucks earned a first round bye and played in the quarter-finals against the Montreal Canadiens; the Canucks lost 4 games to 1.

This season also marked the first season in which the Canucks played without a team captain.

== Regular season ==
=== Final standings ===
Smythe Division
		GP	W	L	T	GF	GA	DIFF	Pts
1	Vancouver Canucks	80	38	32	10	271	254	+17	86
2	St. Louis Blues	80	35	31	14	269	267	+2	84
3	Chicago Blackhawks	80	37	35	8	268	241	+27	82
4	Minnesota North Stars	80	23	50	7	221	341	−120	53
5	Kansas City Scouts	80	15	54	11	184	328	−144	41

=== Record vs. opponents ===
Smythe Division record vs. opponents

Vs. Campbell Conference

Vs. Wales Conference

Vs. Smythe Division

1974–75 NHL records
Team	CHI	KCS	MIN	STL	VAN	Total
Chicago	—	4–1–1	5–1	4–2	2–4	15–8–1
Kansas City	1–4–1	—	2–4	1–5	1–3–2	5–16–3
Minnesota	1–5	4–2	—	1–5	3–2–1	9–14–1
St. Louis	2–4	5–1	5–1	—	2–3–1	14–9–1
Vancouver	4–2	3–1–2	2–3–1	3–2–1	—	12–8–4

Vs. Patrick Division

1974–75 NHL records
Team	ATL	NYI	NYR	PHI	Total
Chicago	3–2	1–1–3	1–3–1	1–4	6–10–4
Kansas City	0–4–1	1–4	0–4–1	0–4–1	1–16–3
Minnesota	1–3–1	0–4–1	1–4	1–4	3–15–2
St. Louis	3–2	2–2–1	1–3–1	2–3	8–10–2
Vancouver	2–1–2	2–1–2	2–3	1–4	7–9–4

Vs. Adams Division

1974–75 NHL records
Team	BOS	BUF	CAL	TOR	Total
Chicago	2–2	1–3	3–1	2–2	8–8–0
Kansas City	1–2–1	0–4	2–1–1	1–2–1	4–9–3
Minnesota	0–3–1	1–3	3–1	1–3	5–10–1
St. Louis	2–1–1	0–2–2	2–1–1	0–2–2	4–6–6
Vancouver	1–3	2–2	4–0	3–1	10–6–0

Vs. Norris Division

1974–75 NHL records
Team	DET	LAK	MTL	PIT	WSH	Total
Chicago	2–1–1	2–2	0–3–1	1–2–1	3–1	8–9–3
Kansas City	1–3	1–3	0–4	0–2–2	3–1	5–13–2
Minnesota	2–0–2	0–4	0–4	1–3	3–0–1	6–11–3
St. Louis	3–0–1	0–3–1	2–1–1	1–1–2	4–0	10–5–5
Vancouver	3–1	1–1–2	0–4	1–3	4–0	9–9–2

== Schedule and results ==
1974–75 regular season
October

Game	Result	Date	Score	Opponent	Record
1	T	October 9, 1974	3–3	Atlanta Flames (1974–75)	0–0–1
2	L	October 12, 1974	3–5	St. Louis Blues (1974–75)	0–1–1
3	W	October 15, 1974	6–4	@ St. Louis Blues (1974–75)	1–1–1
4	T	October 16, 1974	1–1	@ Minnesota North Stars (1974–75)	1–1–2
5	W	October 19, 1974	5–4	@ Toronto Maple Leafs (1974–75)	2–1–2
6	W	October 20, 1974	1–0	@ New York Rangers (1974–75)	3–1–2
7	L	October 22, 1974	2–3	Minnesota North Stars (1974–75)	3–2–2
8	W	October 25, 1974	5–3	Kansas City Scouts (1974–75)	4–2–2
9	L	October 26, 1974	2–3	Philadelphia Flyers (1974–75)	4–3–2
10	W	October 29, 1974	7–0	Detroit Red Wings (1974–75)	5–3–2

November

Game	Result	Date	Score	Opponent	Record
11	W	November 1, 1974	7–4	Pittsburgh Penguins (1974–75)	6–3–2
12	W	November 5, 1974	2–1	New York Rangers (1974–75)	7–3–2
13	W	November 7, 1974	6–4	@ Kansas City Scouts (1974–75)	8–3–2
14	L	November 9, 1974	3–4	@ Montreal Canadiens (1974–75)	8–4–2
15	W	November 10, 1974	4–2	@ Detroit Red Wings (1974–75)	9–4–2
16	W	November 12, 1974	1–0	Chicago Black Hawks (1974–75)	10–4–2
17	T	November 15, 1974	2–2	Los Angeles Kings (1974–75)	10–4–3
18	W	November 16, 1974	5–2	Toronto Maple Leafs (1974–75)	11–4–3
19	W	November 19, 1974	6–3	St. Louis Blues (1974–75)	12–4–3
20	W	November 21, 1974	4–3	@ Philadelphia Flyers (1974–75)	13–4–3
21	T	November 23, 1974	3–3	@ New York Islanders (1974–75)	13–4–4
22	L	November 24, 1974	4–7	@ Boston Bruins (1974–75)	13–5–4
23	L	November 26, 1974	3–4	@ Kansas City Scouts (1974–75)	13–6–4
24	W	November 27, 1974	6–1	@ St. Louis Blues (1974–75)	14–6–4
25	W	November 30, 1974	3–0	New York Islanders (1974–75)	15–6–4

December

Game	Result	Date	Score	Opponent	Record
26	W	December 3, 1974	6–5	Minnesota North Stars (1974–75)	16–6–4
27	W	December 6, 1974	7–5	Atlanta Flames (1974–75)	17–6–4
28	L	December 8, 1974	2–4	@ Detroit Red Wings (1974–75)	17–7–4
29	W	December 10, 1974	3–0	California Golden Seals (1974–75)	18–7–4
30	W	December 12, 1974	5–3	@ Buffalo Sabres (1974–75)	19–7–4
31	T	December 14, 1974	2–2	@ Kansas City Scouts (1974–75)	19–7–5
32	L	December 15, 1974	2–4	@ Chicago Black Hawks (1974–75)	19–8–5
33	W	December 17, 1974	4–2	Washington Capitals (1974–75)	20–8–5
34	L	December 20, 1974	1–6	Montreal Canadiens (1974–75)	20–9–5
35	W	December 22, 1974	6–4	@ California Golden Seals (1974–75)	21–9–5
36	L	December 26, 1974	1–5	@ Los Angeles Kings (1974–75)	21–10–5
37	W	December 28, 1974	6–4	Boston Bruins (1974–75)	22–10–5

January

Game	Result	Date	Score	Opponent	Record
38	L	January 1, 1975	0–2	Philadelphia Flyers (1974–75)	22–11–5
39	L	January 4, 1975	3–4	@ Pittsburgh Penguins (1974–75)	22–12–5
40	L	January 5, 1975	2–6	@ New York Rangers (1974–75)	22–13–5
41	L	January 8, 1975	4–6	@ Toronto Maple Leafs (1974–75)	22–14–5
42	L	January 9, 1975	1–5	@ Boston Bruins (1974–75)	22–15–5
43	L	January 12, 1975	1–5	@ Buffalo Sabres (1974–75)	22–16–5
44	L	January 15, 1975	1–2	@ Chicago Black Hawks (1974–75)	22–17–5
45	L	January 17, 1975	2–4	Buffalo Sabres (1974–75)	22–18–5
46	L	January 18, 1975	2–3	New York Rangers (1974–75)	22–19–5
47	W	January 23, 1975	3–2	@ Washington Capitals (1974–75)	23–19–5
48	W	January 24, 1975	4–1	@ Atlanta Flames (1974–75)	24–19–5
49	W	January 26, 1975	6–4	Toronto Maple Leafs (1974–75)	25–19–5
50	L	January 28, 1975	1–3	Montreal Canadiens (1974–75)	25–20–5

February

Game	Result	Date	Score	Opponent	Record
51	W	February 1, 1975	5–2	Washington Capitals (1974–75)	26–20–5
52	L	February 4, 1975	2–3	Pittsburgh Penguins (1974–75)	26–21–5
53	W	February 7, 1975	3–1	Chicago Black Hawks (1974–75)	27–21–5
54	W	February 11, 1975	4–0	Kansas City Scouts (1974–75)	28–21–5
55	W	February 14, 1975	5–4	Detroit Red Wings (1974–75)	29–21–5
56	T	February 15, 1975	3–3	Atlanta Flames (1974–75)	29–21–6
57	L	February 18, 1975	1–3	Boston Bruins (1974–75)	29–22–6
58	W	February 21, 1975	4–1	@ New York Islanders (1974–75)	30–22–6
59	L	February 22, 1975	1–4	@ Minnesota North Stars (1974–75)	30–23–6
60	L	February 26, 1975	3–4	@ Montreal Canadiens (1974–75)	30–24–6
61	L	February 27, 1975	1–3	@ Philadelphia Flyers (1974–75)	30–25–6

March

Game	Result	Date	Score	Opponent	Record
62	L	March 1, 1975	3–7	@ Pittsburgh Penguins (1974–75)	30–26–6
63	W	March 2, 1975	7–3	@ Washington Capitals (1974–75)	31–26–6
64	L	March 4, 1975	4–6	@ Minnesota North Stars (1974–75)	31–27–6
65	L	March 5, 1975	2–5	@ St. Louis Blues (1974–75)	31–28–6
66	W	March 7, 1975	2–1	Chicago Black Hawks (1974–75)	32–28–6
67	L	March 8, 1975	5–7	New York Islanders (1974–75)	32–29–6
68	T	March 11, 1975	3–3	Kansas City Scouts (1974–75)	32–29–7
69	W	March 14, 1975	5–1	Buffalo Sabres (1974–75)	33–29–7
70	W	March 16, 1975	4–3	@ Chicago Black Hawks (1974–75)	34–29–7
71	T	March 18, 1975	4–4	@ New York Islanders (1974–75)	34–29–8
72	L	March 19, 1975	0–3	@ New York Rangers (1974–75)	34–30–8
73	L	March 21, 1975	4–12	@ Atlanta Flames (1974–75)	34–31–8
74	T	March 23, 1975	3–3	St. Louis Blues (1974–75)	34–31–9
75	L	March 25, 1975	3–5	Philadelphia Flyers (1974–75)	34–32–9
76	W	March 28, 1975	4–2	Los Angeles Kings (1974–75)	35–32–9
77	T	March 29, 1975	3–3	@ Los Angeles Kings (1974–75)	35–32–10

April

Game	Result	Date	Score	Opponent	Record
78	W	April 1, 1975	7–0	California Golden Seals (1974–75)	36–32–10
79	W	April 2, 1975	3–0	@ California Golden Seals (1974–75)	37–32–10
80	W	April 4, 1975	4–1	Minnesota North Stars (1974–75)	38–32–10

Legend: Win (2 points) Loss (0 points) Tie (1 point)

== Awards and records ==
=== Trophies and awards ===
- Cyclone Taylor Award (Canucks MVP): Gary Smith
- Cyrus H. McLean Trophy (Canucks Leading Scorer): Andre Boudrias
- Babe Pratt Trophy (Canucks Outstanding Defenceman): Bob Dailey
- Fred J. Hume Award (Canucks Unsung Hero): Garry Monahan
- Most Exciting Player Award: Bobby Lalonde

== Draft picks ==
Vancouver's picks at the 1974 NHL amateur draft. The draft was held at the NHL Office in Montreal.

Round	#	Player	Nationality	College/junior/club team (league)
2	23	Ron Sedlbauer (LW)	Canada	Kitchener Rangers (OHA)
3	41	John Hughes (D)	Canada	Toronto Marlboros (OHA)
4	59	Harold Snepsts (D)	Canada	Edmonton Oil Kings (WCHL)
5	77	Mike Rogers (C)	Canada	Calgary Centennials (WCHL)
6	95	Andy Spruce	Canada	London Knights (OHA)
7	113	Jim Clarke (D)	Canada	Toronto Marlboros (OHA)
8	130	Robbie Watt (F)	Canada	Flin Flon Bombers (WCHL)
9	147	Marc Gaudreault (G)	Canada	Lake Superior State University (NCAA)

== See also ==
- 1974–75 NHL season
