= 1974–75 Minnesota North Stars season =

National Hockey League team season

1974–75 Minnesota North Stars
- Division: 4th Smythe
- Conference: 8th Campbell
- 1974–75 record: 23–50–7
- Home record: 17–20–3
- Road record: 6–30–4
- Goals for: 221
- Goals against: 341

Team information
- General manager: Jack Gordon
- Coach: Jack Gordon; Charlie Burns
- Captain: Bill Goldsworthy
- Alternate captains: J. P. Parise; Barry Gibbs; Dennis Hextall
- Arena: Met Center

Team leaders
- Goals: Bill Goldsworthy (37)
- Assists: Dennis Hextall (57)
- Points: Dennis Hextall (74)
- Penalty minutes: Dennis Hextall (147)
- Wins: Cesare Maniago (11)
- Goals against average: Pete LoPresti (4.19)

The 1974–75 Minnesota North Stars season was the North Stars' eighth season.

Coached by Jack Gordon (11–22–5) and Charlie Burns (12–28–2), the team compiled a record of 23–50–7 for 53 points, finishing the regular season 4th in the Smythe Division, and failed to qualify for the playoffs.

== Regular season ==
=== Final standings ===
Smythe Division
		GP	W	L	T	GF	GA	DIFF	Pts
1	Vancouver Canucks	80	38	32	10	271	254	+17	86
2	St. Louis Blues	80	35	31	14	269	267	+2	84
3	Chicago Blackhawks	80	37	35	8	268	241	+27	82
4	Minnesota North Stars	80	23	50	7	221	341	−120	53
5	Kansas City Scouts	80	15	54	11	184	328	−144	41

=== Record vs. opponents ===
Smythe Division record vs. opponents

Vs. Campbell Conference

Vs. Wales Conference

Vs. Smythe Division

1974–75 NHL records
Team	CHI	KCS	MIN	STL	VAN	Total
Chicago	—	4–1–1	5–1	4–2	2–4	15–8–1
Kansas City	1–4–1	—	2–4	1–5	1–3–2	5–16–3
Minnesota	1–5	4–2	—	1–5	3–2–1	9–14–1
St. Louis	2–4	5–1	5–1	—	2–3–1	14–9–1
Vancouver	4–2	3–1–2	2–3–1	3–2–1	—	12–8–4

Vs. Patrick Division

1974–75 NHL records
Team	ATL	NYI	NYR	PHI	Total
Chicago	3–2	1–1–3	1–3–1	1–4	6–10–4
Kansas City	0–4–1	1–4	0–4–1	0–4–1	1–16–3
Minnesota	1–3–1	0–4–1	1–4	1–4	3–15–2
St. Louis	3–2	2–2–1	1–3–1	2–3	8–10–2
Vancouver	2–1–2	2–1–2	2–3	1–4	7–9–4

Vs. Adams Division

1974–75 NHL records
Team	BOS	BUF	CAL	TOR	Total
Chicago	2–2	1–3	3–1	2–2	8–8–0
Kansas City	1–2–1	0–4	2–1–1	1–2–1	4–9–3
Minnesota	0–3–1	1–3	3–1	1–3	5–10–1
St. Louis	2–1–1	0–2–2	2–1–1	0–2–2	4–6–6
Vancouver	1–3	2–2	4–0	3–1	10–6–0

Vs. Norris Division

1974–75 NHL records
Team	DET	LAK	MTL	PIT	WSH	Total
Chicago	2–1–1	2–2	0–3–1	1–2–1	3–1	8–9–3
Kansas City	1–3	1–3	0–4	0–2–2	3–1	5–13–2
Minnesota	2–0–2	0–4	0–4	1–3	3–0–1	6–11–3
St. Louis	3–0–1	0–3–1	2–1–1	1–1–2	4–0	10–5–5
Vancouver	3–1	1–1–2	0–4	1–3	4–0	9–9–2

== Schedule and results ==
1974–75 regular season
October

Game	Result	Date	Score	Opponent	Record
1	L	October 9, 1974	2–4	Pittsburgh Penguins (1974–75)	0–1–0
2	W	October 12, 1974	6–0	Washington Capitals (1974–75)	1–1–0
3	T	October 16, 1974	1–1	Vancouver Canucks (1974–75)	1–1–1
4	L	October 19, 1974	1–2	Buffalo Sabres (1974–75)	1–2–1
5	L	October 20, 1974	0–6	@ Chicago Black Hawks (1974–75)	1–3–1
6	W	October 22, 1974	3–2	@ Vancouver Canucks (1974–75)	2–3–1
7	T	October 25, 1974	2–2	@ Atlanta Flames (1974–75)	2–3–2
8	L	October 26, 1974	0–4	@ New York Islanders (1974–75)	2–4–2
9	T	October 30, 1974	3–3	Boston Bruins (1974–75)	2–4–3

November

Game	Result	Date	Score	Opponent	Record
10	L	November 3, 1974	1–10	@ Boston Bruins (1974–75)	2–5–3
11	L	November 4, 1974	1–6	@ Montreal Canadiens (1974–75)	2–6–3
12	L	November 6, 1974	4–7	@ Toronto Maple Leafs (1974–75)	2–7–3
13	L	November 7, 1974	0–2	@ Philadelphia Flyers (1974–75)	2–8–3
14	W	November 9, 1974	7–5	Toronto Maple Leafs (1974–75)	3–8–3
15	W	November 13, 1974	7–4	Detroit Red Wings (1974–75)	4–8–3
16	L	November 14, 1974	3–5	@ Buffalo Sabres (1974–75)	4–9–3
17	W	November 16, 1974	3–1	Kansas City Scouts (1974–75)	5–9–3
18	L	November 18, 1974	4–9	@ Montreal Canadiens (1974–75)	5–10–3
19	W	November 21, 1974	3–2	St. Louis Blues (1974–75)	6–10–3
20	W	November 23, 1974	3–1	California Golden Seals (1974–75)	7–10–3
21	T	November 24, 1974	4–4	@ Washington Capitals (1974–75)	7–10–4
22	W	November 27, 1974	6–4	Washington Capitals (1974–75)	8–10–4
23	W	November 30, 1974	5–3	Chicago Black Hawks (1974–75)	9–10–4

December

Game	Result	Date	Score	Opponent	Record
24	L	December 1, 1974	0–3	@ Chicago Black Hawks (1974–75)	9–11–4
25	L	December 3, 1974	5–6	@ Vancouver Canucks (1974–75)	9–12–4
26	L	December 4, 1974	1–4	@ Los Angeles Kings (1974–75)	9–13–4
27	L	December 6, 1974	3–5	@ California Golden Seals (1974–75)	9–14–4
28	L	December 8, 1974	0–5	@ Buffalo Sabres (1974–75)	9–15–4
29	L	December 10, 1974	3–5	Montreal Canadiens (1974–75)	9–16–4
30	L	December 12, 1974	0–6	@ Philadelphia Flyers (1974–75)	9–17–4
31	W	December 14, 1974	4–2	Buffalo Sabres (1974–75)	10–17–4
32	L	December 18, 1974	0–7	@ New York Rangers (1974–75)	10–18–4
33	W	December 21, 1974	8–7	Pittsburgh Penguins (1974–75)	11–18–4
34	T	December 26, 1974	4–4	@ Detroit Red Wings (1974–75)	11–18–5
35	L	December 28, 1974	2–4	@ St. Louis Blues (1974–75)	11–19–5
36	L	December 30, 1974	1–8	New York Rangers (1974–75)	11–20–5

January

Game	Result	Date	Score	Opponent	Record
37	L	January 2, 1975	3–6	@ Pittsburgh Penguins (1974–75)	11–21–5
38	L	January 4, 1975	0–8	Boston Bruins (1974–75)	11–22–5
39	L	January 6, 1975	2–5	@ Kansas City Scouts (1974–75)	11–23–5
40	L	January 8, 1975	2–4	Los Angeles Kings (1974–75)	11–24–5
41	L	January 15, 1975	3–5	New York Rangers (1974–75)	11–25–5
42	L	January 18, 1975	4–5	@ St. Louis Blues (1974–75)	11–26–5
43	T	January 19, 1975	4–4	@ Detroit Red Wings (1974–75)	11–26–6
44	L	January 23, 1975	0–7	Montreal Canadiens (1974–75)	11–27–6
45	W	January 25, 1975	4–1	Kansas City Scouts (1974–75)	12–27–6
46	L	January 28, 1975	2–6	@ New York Islanders (1974–75)	12–28–6
47	L	January 29, 1975	3–4	New York Islanders (1974–75)	12–29–6

February

Game	Result	Date	Score	Opponent	Record
48	W	February 1, 1975	3–2	@ Kansas City Scouts (1974–75)	13–29–6
49	L	February 2, 1975	3–5	Atlanta Flames (1974–75)	13–30–6
50	L	February 5, 1975	1–2	Chicago Black Hawks (1974–75)	13–31–6
51	L	February 6, 1975	2–3	@ Boston Bruins (1974–75)	13–32–6
52	W	February 8, 1975	5–0	Philadelphia Flyers (1974–75)	14–32–6
53	W	February 9, 1975	3–2	@ Atlanta Flames (1974–75)	15–32–6
54	L	February 12, 1975	2–4	New York Islanders (1974–75)	15–33–6
55	L	February 15, 1975	2–9	New York Rangers (1974–75)	15–34–6
56	W	February 16, 1975	8–4	California Golden Seals (1974–75)	16–34–6
57	L	February 19, 1975	2–4	Atlanta Flames (1974–75)	16–35–6
58	W	February 22, 1975	4–1	Vancouver Canucks (1974–75)	17–35–6
59	L	February 23, 1975	2–4	@ Kansas City Scouts (1974–75)	17–36–6
60	L	February 25, 1975	2–9	Toronto Maple Leafs (1974–75)	17–37–6
61	W	February 26, 1975	3–1	@ California Golden Seals (1974–75)	18–37–6

March

Game	Result	Date	Score	Opponent	Record
62	L	March 1, 1975	4–7	@ Los Angeles Kings (1974–75)	18–38–6
63	W	March 4, 1975	6–4	Vancouver Canucks (1974–75)	19–38–6
64	L	March 5, 1975	2–9	Philadelphia Flyers (1974–75)	19–39–6
65	L	March 8, 1975	3–5	@ Toronto Maple Leafs (1974–75)	19–40–6
66	L	March 9, 1975	4–5	St. Louis Blues (1974–75)	19–41–6
67	L	March 12, 1975	4–9	@ Atlanta Flames (1974–75)	19–42–6
68	L	March 15, 1975	2–5	Chicago Black Hawks (1974–75)	19–43–6
69	W	March 16, 1975	4–3	Detroit Red Wings (1974–75)	20–43–6
70	L	March 18, 1975	3–5	Los Angeles Kings (1974–75)	20–44–6
71	W	March 20, 1975	5–1	@ Washington Capitals (1974–75)	21–44–6
72	L	March 22, 1975	0–4	@ Philadelphia Flyers (1974–75)	21–45–6
73	T	March 23, 1975	3–3	New York Islanders (1974–75)	21–45–7
74	W	March 25, 1975	2–1	Kansas City Scouts (1974–75)	22–45–7
75	W	March 26, 1975	4–2	@ New York Rangers (1974–75)	23–45–7
76	L	March 29, 1975	1–2	@ St. Louis Blues (1974–75)	23–46–7
77	L	March 30, 1975	1–4	@ Pittsburgh Penguins (1974–75)	23–47–7

April

Game	Result	Date	Score	Opponent	Record
78	L	April 1, 1975	3–7	St. Louis Blues (1974–75)	23–48–7
79	L	April 4, 1975	1–4	@ Vancouver Canucks (1974–75)	23–49–7
80	L	April 6, 1975	0–3	@ Chicago Black Hawks (1974–75)	23–50–7

Legend: Win (2 points) Loss (0 points) Tie (1 point)

== Draft picks ==
Minnesota's draft picks at the 1974 NHL amateur draft held in Montreal.

Round	#	Player	Nationality	College/Junior/Club team (League)
1	6	Doug Hicks	Canada	Flin Flon Bombers (WCHL)
2	24	Rich Nantais	Canada	Quebec Remparts (QMJHL)
3	42	Pete LoPresti	United States	University of Denver (WCHA)
4	60	Kim MacDougall	Canada	Regina Pats (WCHL)
5	78	Ron Ashton	Canada	Saskatoon Blades (WCHL)
6	96	John Sheridan	United States	University of Minnesota (WCHA)
7	114	Dave Heitz	United States	Fargo Sugar Kings (MWJHL)
8	131	Roland Eriksson	Sweden	IF Tunabro (Sweden)
9	148	Dave Staffen	Canada	Ottawa 67's (OMJHL)
10	164	Brian Andersen	Canada	New Westminster Bruins (WCHL)
11	179	Duane Bray	Canada	Flin Flon Bombers (WCHL)
12	193	Don Hay	Canada	New Westminster Bruins (WCHL)
13	205	Brian Holderness	Canada	Saskatoon Blades (WCHL)
14	215	Frank Taylor	Canada	Brandon Wheat Kings (WCHL)
15	222	Jeff Hymanson	United States	St. Cloud Junior Blues (MWJHL)

== See also ==
- 1974–75 NHL season
