= 1974–75 Chicago Black Hawks season =

National Hockey League team season

1974–75 Chicago Black Hawks
- Division: 3rd Smythe
- Conference: 7th Campbell
- 1974–75 record: 37–35–8
- Home record: 24–12–4
- Road record: 13–23–4
- Goals for: 268
- Goals against: 241

Team information
- General manager: Tommy Ivan
- Coach: Billy Reay
- Captain: Vacant
- Alternate captains: Doug Jarrett; Stan Mikita; Bill White
- Arena: Chicago Stadium

Team leaders
- Goals: Jim Pappin; Stan Mikita (36)
- Assists: Stan Mikita (50)
- Points: Stan Mikita (86)
- Penalty minutes: Phil Russell (260)
- Plus/minus: John Marks (+27)
- Wins: Tony Esposito (34)
- Goals against average: Tony Esposito (2.74)

The 1974–75 Chicago Black Hawks season was the Hawks' 49th season in the NHL, and the club was coming off a 41–14–23 record in 1973–74, earning 105 points, and finishing in second place in the West Division. Then, the Black Hawks upset the heavily favored Boston Bruins in the NHL preliminary series before losing to the Buffalo Sabres in the NHL quarterfinals.

During the off-season, the NHL made a number of changes. The league expanded by two more teams, as the Kansas City Scouts and Washington Capitals joined the league, making the NHL an 18 team league. The schedule was then bumped up from 78 games to 80, and the previously two division league was split into two conferences and four divisions. The Black Hawks found themselves in the newly created Smythe Division with the Minnesota North Stars, St. Louis Blues, Vancouver Canucks, and the expansion team Kansas City Scouts. The Smythe Division was part of the newly created Campbell Conference.

Chicago began the regular season with a strong 7–3–1 in their first eleven games, however, the team fell into a slump, and found themselves under the .500 level 26 games into the season with a record of 11–12–3. The Black Hawks would continue to hover around .500 for the rest of the season, and eventually finish the year with a 37–35–8 record, earning 82 points. Chicago's 37 victories and 82 points were their lowest totals since the 1968–69 season, while their 35 losses was the most since the team lost 39 in 1957–58. The team finished in third place in the Smythe Division, and earn a spot in the post-season as the eleventh seed.

Offensively, the Black Hawks were led by Stan Mikita, who led the club with 36 goals, 50 assists and 86 points. Jim Pappin tied Mikita with 36 goals, and added 27 assists for 63 points. Newly acquired Ivan Boldirev, who spent the previous season with the California Golden Seals, stepped in and finished second in team scoring with 67 points, as he recorded 23 goals and 44 assists. Cliff Koroll had a strong season, scoring 27 goals and 59 points, while defenseman Dick Redmond led the blueline with 14 goals and 57 points. John Marks led the Black Hawks with a +27 rating, while Phil Russell had a team high 260 penalty minutes.

In goal, Tony Esposito once again led the club with 34 victories and a 2.74 GAA, earning six shutouts in 71 games.

The Hawks opened the playoffs against the fifth seeded Boston Bruins in a best of three preliminary round. The Bruins finished the season with a 40–26–14 record, earning 94 points, and a second-place finish in the Adams Division. The series opened with a game at the Boston Garden, and the heavily favored Bruins easily disposed the Black Hawks by a score of 8–2. The series moved to Chicago Stadium for the next game, and the Hawks responded, with a 4–3 overtime victory, to set up a third and final game back in Boston. Chicago would complete the upset, stunning the Bruins by a score of 6–4 in the third game, to advance to the NHL quarter-finals.

Chicago's next opponent in a best of seven series was the second seeded Buffalo Sabres, who had a record of 49–16–15, earning 113 points, and a first-place finish in the Adams Division. The series started with two games at the Buffalo Memorial Auditorium. The Sabres used their home ice advantage, and quickly took a 2–0 series lead with wins of 4–1 and 3–1. The series moved to Chicago for the next two games, and the Hawks cut into the Sabres lead with a 5–4 overtime win in the third game. Buffalo responded in the fourth game though, as they cruised to a 6–2 win. The Sabres closed out the series in the fifth game back in Buffalo, winning the game 3–1.

== Season standings ==
=== Final standings ===
Smythe Division
		GP	W	L	T	GF	GA	DIFF	Pts
1	Vancouver Canucks	80	38	32	10	271	254	+17	86
2	St. Louis Blues	80	35	31	14	269	267	+2	84
3	Chicago Blackhawks	80	37	35	8	268	241	+27	82
4	Minnesota North Stars	80	23	50	7	221	341	−120	53
5	Kansas City Scouts	80	15	54	11	184	328	−144	41

=== Record vs. opponents ===
Smythe Division record vs. opponents

Vs. Campbell Conference

Vs. Wales Conference

Vs. Smythe Division

1974–75 NHL records
Team	CHI	KCS	MIN	STL	VAN	Total
Chicago	—	4–1–1	5–1	4–2	2–4	15–8–1
Kansas City	1–4–1	—	2–4	1–5	1–3–2	5–16–3
Minnesota	1–5	4–2	—	1–5	3–2–1	9–14–1
St. Louis	2–4	5–1	5–1	—	2–3–1	14–9–1
Vancouver	4–2	3–1–2	2–3–1	3–2–1	—	12–8–4

Vs. Patrick Division

1974–75 NHL records
Team	ATL	NYI	NYR	PHI	Total
Chicago	3–2	1–1–3	1–3–1	1–4	6–10–4
Kansas City	0–4–1	1–4	0–4–1	0–4–1	1–16–3
Minnesota	1–3–1	0–4–1	1–4	1–4	3–15–2
St. Louis	3–2	2–2–1	1–3–1	2–3	8–10–2
Vancouver	2–1–2	2–1–2	2–3	1–4	7–9–4

Vs. Adams Division

1974–75 NHL records
Team	BOS	BUF	CAL	TOR	Total
Chicago	2–2	1–3	3–1	2–2	8–8–0
Kansas City	1–2–1	0–4	2–1–1	1–2–1	4–9–3
Minnesota	0–3–1	1–3	3–1	1–3	5–10–1
St. Louis	2–1–1	0–2–2	2–1–1	0–2–2	4–6–6
Vancouver	1–3	2–2	4–0	3–1	10–6–0

Vs. Norris Division

1974–75 NHL records
Team	DET	LAK	MTL	PIT	WSH	Total
Chicago	2–1–1	2–2	0–3–1	1–2–1	3–1	8–9–3
Kansas City	1–3	1–3	0–4	0–2–2	3–1	5–13–2
Minnesota	2–0–2	0–4	0–4	1–3	3–0–1	6–11–3
St. Louis	3–0–1	0–3–1	2–1–1	1–1–2	4–0	10–5–5
Vancouver	3–1	1–1–2	0–4	1–3	4–0	9–9–2

== Schedule and results ==
=== Regular season ===
1974–75 regular season
October

Game	Date	Visitor	Score	Home	Record	Points
1	October 9	Chicago Black Hawks	1–2	Detroit Red Wings	0–1–0	0
2	October 13	Atlanta Flames	4–3	Chicago Black Hawks	0–2–0	0
3	October 16	Boston Bruins	0–4	Chicago Black Hawks	1–2–0	2
4	October 17	Chicago Black Hawks	3–4	Washington Capitals	1–3–0	2
5	October 19	Chicago Black Hawks	3–1	St. Louis Blues	2–3–0	4
6	October 20	Minnesota North Stars	0–6	Chicago Black Hawks	3–3–0	6
7	October 23	Washington Capitals	2–3	Chicago Black Hawks	4–3–0	8
8	October 26	Chicago Black Hawks	9–3	Toronto Maple Leafs	5–3–0	10
9	October 27	St. Louis Blues	3–10	Chicago Black Hawks	6–3–0	12
10	October 30	Chicago Black Hawks	4–4	Montreal Canadiens	6–3–1	13

November

Game	Date	Visitor	Score	Home	Record	Points
11	November 2	Chicago Black Hawks	4–3	Kansas City Scouts	7–3–1	15
12	November 3	Pittsburgh Penguins	3–3	Chicago Black Hawks	7–3–2	16
13	November 6	Chicago Black Hawks	4–6	Buffalo Sabres	7–4–2	16
14	November 8	Chicago Black Hawks	0–2	Atlanta Flames	7–5–2	16
15	November 12	Chicago Black Hawks	0–1	Vancouver Canucks	7–6–2	16
16	November 13	Chicago Black Hawks	0–2	California Golden Seals	7–7–2	16
17	November 16	Chicago Black Hawks	2–1	Los Angeles Kings	8–7–2	18
18	November 20	New York Islanders	4–4	Chicago Black Hawks	8–7–3	19
19	November 23	Kansas City Scouts	0–6	Chicago Black Hawks	9–7–3	21
20	November 27	Buffalo Sabres	3–1	Chicago Black Hawks	9–8–3	21
21	November 30	Chicago Black Hawks	3–5	Minnesota North Stars	9–9–3	21

December

Game	Date	Visitor	Score	Home	Record	Points
22	December 1	Minnesota North Stars	0–3	Chicago Black Hawks	10–9–3	23
23	December 4	Kansas City Scouts	3–7	Chicago Black Hawks	11–9–3	25
24	December 5	Chicago Black Hawks	2–3	Philadelphia Flyers	11–10–3	25
25	December 7	New York Rangers	7–4	Chicago Black Hawks	11–11–3	25
26	December 8	Toronto Maple Leafs	4–1	Chicago Black Hawks	11–12–3	25
27	December 11	Chicago Black Hawks	5–2	Atlanta Flames	12–12–3	27
28	December 14	Chicago Black Hawks	3–6	Pittsburgh Penguins	12–13–3	27
29	December 15	Vancouver Canucks	2–4	Chicago Black Hawks	13–13–3	29
30	December 18	Detroit Red Wings	5–7	Chicago Black Hawks	14–13–3	31
31	December 21	Chicago Black Hawks	3–3	New York Islanders	14–13–4	32
32	December 22	Toronto Maple Leafs	0–3	Chicago Black Hawks	15–13–4	34
33	December 26	Chicago Black Hawks	1–3	Buffalo Sabres	15–14–4	34
34	December 28	Philadelphia Flyers	1–2	Chicago Black Hawks	16–14–4	36
35	December 29	St. Louis Blues	2–5	Chicago Black Hawks	17–14–4	38
36	December 31	Los Angeles Kings	3–1	Chicago Black Hawks	17–15–4	38

January

Game	Date	Visitor	Score	Home	Record	Points
37	January 1	Chicago Black Hawks	2–6	New York Rangers	17–16–4	38
38	January 4	Chicago Black Hawks	3–6	Toronto Maple Leafs	17–17–4	38
39	January 5	Montreal Canadiens	6–4	Chicago Black Hawks	17–18–4	38
40	January 8	Pittsburgh Penguins	5–7	Chicago Black Hawks	18–18–4	40
41	January 11	Chicago Black Hawks	1–5	Boston Bruins	18–19–4	40
42	January 12	New York Rangers	2–4	Chicago Black Hawks	19–19–4	42
43	January 15	Vancouver Canucks	1–2	Chicago Black Hawks	20–19–4	44
44	January 18	Chicago Black Hawks	1–4	Kansas City Scouts	20–20–4	44
45	January 19	California Golden Seals	1–3	Chicago Black Hawks	21–20–4	46
46	January 23	New York Islanders	1–3	Chicago Black Hawks	22–20–4	48
47	January 25	Chicago Black Hawks	4–1	St. Louis Blues	23–20–4	50
48	January 26	California Golden Seals	2–3	Chicago Black Hawks	24–20–4	52
49	January 29	Chicago Black Hawks	1–6	Pittsburgh Penguins	24–21–4	52

February

Game	Date	Visitor	Score	Home	Record	Points
50	February 1	New York Rangers	4–1	Chicago Black Hawks	24–22–4	52
51	February 2	New York Islanders	1–1	Chicago Black Hawks	24–22–5	53
52	February 4	Chicago Black Hawks	3–3	Kansas City Scouts	24–22–6	54
53	February 5	Chicago Black Hawks	2–1	Minnesota North Stars	25–22–6	56
54	February 7	Chicago Black Hawks	1–3	Vancouver Canucks	25–23–6	56
55	February 9	Los Angeles Kings	2–1	Chicago Black Hawks	25–24–6	56
56	February 12	Boston Bruins	3–8	Chicago Black Hawks	26–24–6	58
57	February 13	Chicago Black Hawks	1–4	Philadelphia Flyers	26–25–6	58
58	February 15	Chicago Black Hawks	3–12	Montreal Canadiens	26–26–6	58
59	February 16	Montreal Canadiens	6–3	Chicago Black Hawks	26–27–6	58
60	February 19	Chicago Black Hawks	2–2	New York Rangers	26–27–7	59
61	February 22	Washington Capitals	3–10	Chicago Black Hawks	27–27–7	61
62	February 23	Atlanta Flames	0–4	Chicago Black Hawks	28–27–7	63
63	February 25	Chicago Black Hawks	6–2	Washington Capitals	29–27–7	65
64	February 28	Chicago Black Hawks	4–3	Atlanta Flames	30–27–7	67

March

Game	Date	Visitor	Score	Home	Record	Points
65	March 2	Chicago Black Hawks	2–6	Boston Bruins	30–28–7	67
66	March 5	Chicago Black Hawks	4–2	California Golden Seals	31–28–7	69
67	March 7	Chicago Black Hawks	1–2	Vancouver Canucks	31–29–7	69
68	March 8	Chicago Black Hawks	6–1	Los Angeles Kings	32–29–7	71
69	March 12	St. Louis Blues	4–3	Chicago Black Hawks	32–30–7	71
70	March 15	Chicago Black Hawks	5–2	Minnesota North Stars	33–30–7	73
71	March 16	Vancouver Canucks	4–3	Chicago Black Hawks	33–31–7	73
72	March 20	Chicago Black Hawks	6–2	Detroit Red Wings	34–31–7	75
73	March 22	Chicago Black Hawks	2–4	New York Islanders	34–32–7	75
74	March 23	Detroit Red Wings	4–4	Chicago Black Hawks	34–32–8	76
75	March 26	Buffalo Sabres	1–5	Chicago Black Hawks	35–32–8	78
76	March 29	Philadelphia Flyers	5–2	Chicago Black Hawks	35–33–8	78
77	March 30	Chicago Black Hawks	1–4	Philadelphia Flyers	35–34–8	78

April

Game	Date	Visitor	Score	Home	Record	Points
78	April 3	Kansas City Scouts	4–6	Chicago Black Hawks	36–34–8	80
79	April 5	Chicago Black Hawks	3–4	St. Louis Blues	36–35–8	80
80	April 6	Minnesota North Stars	0–3	Chicago Black Hawks	37–35–8	82

Legend: Win (2 points) Loss (0 points) Tie (1 point)

=== Playoffs ===
1975 Stanley Cup playoffs
Preliminary round vs. (2) Boston Bruins – Black Hawks win 2–1

Game	Date	Visitor	Score	Home	Series
1	April 8	Chicago Black Hawks	2–8	Boston Bruins	0–1
2	April 10	Boston Bruins	3–4	Chicago Black Hawks	1–1
3	April 11	Chicago Black Hawks	6–4	Boston Bruins	2–1

Quarterfinals vs. (2) Buffalo Sabres – Sabres win 4–1

Game	Date	Visitor	Score	Home	Series
1	April 13	Chicago Black Hawks	1–4	Buffalo Sabres	0–1
2	April 15	Chicago Black Hawks	1–3	Buffalo Sabres	0–2
3	April 17	Buffalo Sabres	4–5	Chicago Black Hawks	1–2
4	April 20	Buffalo Sabres	6–2	Chicago Black Hawks	1–3
5	April 22	Chicago Black Hawks	1–3	Buffalo Sabres	1–4

Legend: Win Loss

== Season stats ==
=== Scoring leaders ===
Player	GP	G	A	Pts	PIM
Stan Mikita	79	36	50	86	48
Ivan Boldirev	80	24	43	67	54
Jim Pappin	71	36	27	63	94
Cliff Koroll	80	27	32	59	27
Dick Redmond	80	14	43	57	90

=== Goaltending ===
Player	GP	TOI	W	L	T	GA	SO	GAA
Tony Esposito	71	4219	34	30	7	193	6	2.74
Michel Dumas	3	121	2	0	0	7	0	3.47
Mike Veisor	9	460	1	5	1	36	0	4.70

== Playoff stats ==
=== Scoring leaders ===
Player	GP	G	A	Pts	PIM
Cliff Koroll	8	3	5	8	8
John Marks	8	2	6	8	34
Stan Mikita	8	3	4	7	8
Ivan Boldirev	8	4	2	6	2
Dick Redmond	8	2	3	5	0

=== Goaltending ===
Player	GP	TOI	W	L	GA	SO	GAA
Michel Dumas	1	19	0	0	1	0	3.16
Tony Esposito	8	472	3	5	34	0	4.32

== Draft picks ==
Chicago's draft picks at the 1974 NHL amateur draft held via conference call at the NHL office in Montreal.

Round	#	Player	Nationality	College/Junior/Club team (League)
1	16	Grant Mulvey	Canada	Calgary Centennials (WCHL)
2	34	Alain Daigle	Canada	Trois-Rivières Ducs (QMJHL)
3	52	Bob Murray	Canada	Cornwall Royals (QMJHL)
4	70	Terry Ruskowski	Canada	Swift Current Broncos (WCHL)
5	88	Dave Logan	Canada	Laval National (QMJHL)
6	106	Bob Volpe	Canada	Sudbury Wolves (OHA)
7	124	Eddie Mio	Canada	Colorado College (NCAA)
8	141	Mike St. Cyr	Canada	Kitchener Rangers (OHA)
9	158	Steve Colp	United States	Michigan State University (NCAA)
10	173	Rick Fraser	Canada	Oshawa Generals (OHA)
11	188	Jean Bernier	Canada	Shawinigan Dynamos (QMJHL)
12	200	Dwayne Byers	Canada	Sherbrooke Castors (QMJHL)
13	210	Glen Ing	Canada	Victoria Cougars (WCHL)

== Awards, records and honors ==
- Tommy Ivan, Lester Patrick Trophy

== Sources ==
- Hockey-Reference
- Rauzulu's Street
- Goalies Archive
- HockeyDB
- National Hockey League Guide & Record Book 2007
