= Dennis Patterson (ice hockey) =

Canadian ice hockey player

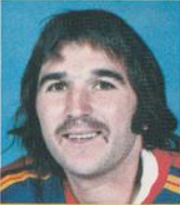
- Patterson in 1974 stamp
- Born: January 9, 1950 (age 76) Peterborough, Ontario, Canada
- Height: 5 ft 8 in (173 cm)
- Weight: 175 lb (79 kg; 12 st 7 lb)
- Position: Defence
- Shot: Left
- Played for: NHL; Kansas City Scouts; Philadelphia Flyers; WHA; Edmonton Oilers
- NHL draft: 34th overall, 1970; Minnesota North Stars
- Playing career: 1970–1983

Dennis Gordon Patterson (born January 9, 1950) is a Canadian former professional ice hockey defenceman who played in the National Hockey League, World Hockey Association, and American Hockey League.

== Early life ==
Patterson was born in Peterborough, Ontario. He played minor ice hockey in Peterborough and went to the 1962 Quebec International Pee-Wee Hockey Tournament with his youth team.

== Career ==
Patterson played three seasons in the National Hockey League (NHL) for the Kansas City Scouts and Philadelphia Flyers and one season in the World Hockey Association (WHA) for the Edmonton Oilers between 1974 and 1980. The rest of his career lasted from 1970 to 1983 and was spent in the minor leagues, mainly the American Hockey League. He is currently a scout for the Flyers.

== Career statistics ==
=== Regular season and playoffs ===
			Regular season					Playoffs
Season	Team	League	GP	G	A	Pts	PIM	GP	G	A	Pts	PIM
1967–68	Chatham Maroons	WOJHL	—	—	—	—	—	—	—	—	—	—
1968–69	Peterborough Petes	OHA	54	5	17	22	56	10	0	2	2	12
1969–70	Peterborough Petes	OHA	54	8	29	37	84	6	0	3	3	6
1970–71	Clinton Comets	EHL	72	6	30	36	93	5	1	1	2	0
1970–71	Cleveland Barons	AHL	9	0	2	2	4	8	0	1	1	22
1971–72	Cleveland Barons	AHL	76	3	17	20	62	6	0	1	1	12
1972–73	Cleveland/Jacksonville Barons	AHL	42	1	11	12	40	—	—	—	—	—
1973–74	New Haven Nighthawks	AHL	70	8	25	33	69	10	1	3	4	4
1974–75	Kansas City Scouts	NHL	66	1	5	6	39	—	—	—	—	—
1974–75	Baltimore Clippers	AHL	12	1	3	4	6	—	—	—	—	—
1975–76	Kansas City Scouts	NHL	69	5	16	21	28	—	—	—	—	—
1975–76	Springfield Indians	AHL	10	0	5	5	12	—	—	—	—	—
1976–77	Rhode Island Reds	AHL	51	3	18	21	22	—	—	—	—	—
1976–77	Edmonton Oilers	WHA	23	0	2	2	2	—	—	—	—	—
1977–78	Maine Mariners	AHL	78	3	24	27	26	12	0	3	3	22
1978–79	Maine Mariners	AHL	74	3	29	32	112	10	1	4	5	32
1979–80	Philadelphia Flyers	NHL	3	0	1	1	0	—	—	—	—	—
1979–80	Maine Mariners	AHL	67	2	25	27	72	10	2	6	8	20
1980–81	Maine Mariners	AHL	70	3	26	29	74	—	—	—	—	—
1981–82	Maine Mariners	AHL	51	1	14	15	111	4	0	0	0	12
1982–83	Maine Mariners	AHL	76	1	19	20	71	17	0	4	4	9
AHL totals			686	29	218	247	681	77	4	22	26	133
WHA totals			23	0	2	2	2	—	—	—	—	—
NHL totals			138	6	22	28	67	—	—	—	—	—
