= Gary Coalter =

Canadian ice hockey player (born 1950)

- Born: July 8, 1950 (age 75) Toronto, Ontario, Canada
- Height: 5 ft 10 in (178 cm)
- Weight: 180 lb (82 kg; 12 st 12 lb)
- Position: Right wing
- Shot: Right
- Played for: Kansas City Scouts; California Golden Seals
- NHL draft: 67th overall, 1970; New York Rangers
- Playing career: 1967–1979

Gary Merritt Charles Coalter (born July 8, 1950) is a Canadian former professional ice hockey forward who played 34 games in the National Hockey League for the Kansas City Scouts and California Golden Seals between 1973 and 1975. The rest of his career, which lasted from 1967 to 1979, was spent in various minor leagues.

== Career statistics ==
=== Regular season and playoffs ===
			Regular season					Playoffs
Season	Team	League	GP	G	A	Pts	PIM	GP	G	A	Pts	PIM
1967–68	Hamilton Red Wings	OHA	53	8	13	21	57	11	1	3	4	7
1968–69	Hamilton Red Wings	OHA	52	18	23	41	144	5	0	1	1	6
1969–70	Hamilton Red Wings	OHA	54	22	26	48	79	—	—	—	—	—
1970–71	Omaha Knights	CHL	68	15	24	39	88	11	4	3	7	29
1971–72	Omaha Knights	CHL	72	15	31	46	105	—	—	—	—	—
1972–73	Providence Reds	AHL	45	10	13	23	67	—	—	—	—	—
1972–73	Omaha Knights	CHL	25	5	8	13	30	11	4	3	7	8
1973–74	California Golden Seals	NHL	4	0	0	0	0	—	—	—	—	—
1973–74	Salt Lake Golden Eagles	WHL	71	38	31	69	45	5	0	0	0	11
1974–75	Kansas City Scouts	NHL	30	2	4	6	2	—	—	—	—	—
1974–75	Baltimore Clippers	AHL	22	8	4	12	28	—	—	—	—	—
1975–76	Springfield Indians	AHL	55	15	17	32	47	—	—	—	—	—
1976–77	Maine Nordiques	NAHL	74	31	54	85	71	12	3	7	10	0
1977–78	Philadelphia Firebirds	AHL	73	25	34	59	22	4	1	1	2	0
1978–79	Philadelphia Firebirds	AHL	63	16	10	26	30	—	—	—	—	—
AHL totals			258	74	78	152	194	4	1	1	2	0
NHL totals			34	2	4	6	2	—	—	—	—	—
