= Mike Baumgartner =

American ice hockey player

- Born: January 30, 1949 (age 76); Roseau, Minnesota, U.S.
- Height: 6 ft 2 in (188 cm)
- Weight: 195 lb (88 kg; 13 st 13 lb)
- Position: Defense
- Shot: Left
- Played for: Kansas City Scouts
- NHL draft: 60th overall, 1969; Chicago Black Hawks
- Playing career: 1971–1976

Michael Edward Baumgartner (born January 30, 1949) is an American former ice hockey defenseman who played 17 games in the National Hockey League (NHL) with the Kansas City Scouts during the 1974–75 season. A native of Minnesota, Baumgartner played high school hockey there before attending the University of North Dakota. He was selected by the Chicago Black Hawks in the 1969 NHL Amateur Draft, though he was traded from the team before playing for them. Baumgartner made his professional debut in 1971 in the Central Hockey League, and spent three seasons there before he made his NHL debut in 1974, but an eye injury forced him to stop after 17 games. He played one final game in the minor American Hockey League before retiring from playing in 1976.

== Playing career ==
Mike Baumgartner played his amateur hockey at the University of North Dakota and was drafted in the 5th round by the Chicago Black Hawks. After two years in the Central Hockey League (CHL) playing for the Dallas Blackhawks, Mike was traded to the Atlanta Flames for Lynn Powis on August 30, 1973 After a 43-point season with the Omaha Knights of the CHL, the Flames traded Baumgartner to the Montreal Canadiens for cash. Before playing a game with Montreal, Baumgartner was sold to the expansion Kansas City Scouts on August 22, 1974

Mike made his NHL debut for the Scouts at Maple Leaf Gardens against the Toronto Maple Leafs on October 9, 1974 and played his final NHL game on December 14, 1974 against the Vancouver Canucks suffering a career ending eye injury. Mike went pointless in 17 regular-season games. Mike played 1 game with the Springfield Indians of the American Hockey League the next season before retiring.

Mike and his wife Sandy, whom he met at UND where she was a cheerleader, settled post-hockey in Mike's native Roseau, Minnesota. The Baumgartners farmed for 37 years, raising wheat, sunflowers, and other grass seeds. As of November 2018, Mike and Sandy had four children and ten grandchildren. (Icing on the Plains: The Rough Ride of Kansas City's NHL Scouts, p. 108, Troy Treasure, Balboa Press)

== Career statistics ==
=== Regular season and playoffs ===
			Regular season					Playoffs
Season	Team	League	GP	G	A	Pts	PIM	GP	G	A	Pts	PIM
1964–65	Roseau High School	HS-MN	—	—	—	—	—	—	—	—	—	—
1965–66	Roseau High School	HS-MN	—	—	—	—	—	—	—	—	—	—
1966–67	Roseau High School	HS-MN	—	—	—	—	—	—	—	—	—	—
1967–68	University of North Dakota	WCHA	29	3	9	12	—	—	—	—	—	—
1968–69	University of North Dakota	WCHA	29	2	5	7	12	—	—	—	—	—
1969–70	University of North Dakota	WCHA	30	9	5	14	12	—	—	—	—	—
1970–71	University of North Dakota	WCHA	33	6	13	19	29	—	—	—	—	—
1971–72	Dallas Black Hawks	CHL	72	3	22	25	66	12	1	2	3	6
1972–73	Dallas Black Hawks	CHL	72	10	37	47	75	4	0	2	2	4
1973–74	Omaha Knights	CHL	70	7	36	43	28	5	0	1	1	6
1974–75	Kansas City Scouts	NHL	17	0	0	0	0	—	—	—	—	—
1975–76	Springfield Indians	AHL	1	0	0	0	2	—	—	—	—	—
CHL totals			214	20	95	115	169	21	1	5	6	16
NHL totals			17	0	0	0	0	—	—	—	—	—
