= Hank Lehvonen =

Canadian retired ice hockey defenceman (1950–2022)

- Born: August 26, 1950; Sarnia, Ontario, Canada
- Died: July 20, 2022 (aged 71); Florida, U.S.
- Height: 6 ft 0 in (183 cm)
- Weight: 195 lb (88 kg; 13 st 13 lb)
- Position: Defenceman
- Shot: Left
- Played for: Kansas City Scouts
- NHL draft: 62nd overall, 1970; Minnesota North Stars
- Playing career: 1970–1982

Henry Kalevi Lehvonen (August 26, 1950 – July 20, 2022) was a Canadian professional ice hockey defenceman. He played four games in the National Hockey League for the Kansas City Scouts during the 1974–75 season, with the bulk of his career, which lasted from 1970 to 1982, in the minor International Hockey League. Selected by the Minnesota North Stars in the 1970 NHL Amateur Draft, Lehvonen spent three years in the minor leagues before he joined the expansion Scouts in 1974. After his stint in the NHL he spent three more seasons in the minors, and after a year away from playing moved to Finland in 1978, where he played a further four seasons before retiring.

Lehvonen was of Finnish descent. He died in Florida on July 20, 2022, at the age of 71.

== Career statistics ==
=== Regular season and playoffs ===
			Regular season					Playoffs
Season	Team	League	GP	G	A	Pts	PIM	GP	G	A	Pts	PIM
1965–66	Sarnia Legionnaires	WOJBHL	—	—	—	—	—	—	—	—	—	—
1966–67	Sarnia Legionnaires	WOJBHL	—	—	—	—	—	—	—	—	—	—
1967–68	Peterborough Petes	OHA	12	0	3	3	6	—	—	—	—	—
1967–68	Kitchener Rangers	OHA	24	2	11	13	8	17	3	12	15	12
1968–69	Kitchener Rangers	OHA	51	12	21	33	20	—	—	—	—	—
1969–70	Kitchener Rangers	OHA	29	2	9	11	25	6	0	1	1	4
1970–71	Clinton Comets	EHL	3	0	0	0	0	—	—	—	—	—
1970–71	Port Huron Flags	IHL	51	4	21	25	29	14	1	3	4	6
1971–72	Port Huron Wings	IHL	9	0	6	6	6	—	—	—	—	—
1972–73	Port Huron Wings	IHL	66	10	38	48	83	11	2	2	4	10
1974–75	Kansas City Scouts	NHL	4	0	0	0	0	—	—	—	—	—
1974–75	Port Huron Flags	IHL	58	9	29	35	94	5	3	2	5	2
1975–76	Port Huron Flags	IHL	16	1	6	7	18	—	—	—	—	—
1975–76	Toledo Goaldiggers	IHL	35	3	10	13	22	4	2	3	5	6
1976–77	Port Huron Flags	IHL	41	0	12	12	18	—	—	—	—	—
1978–79	Jokerit	FIN	36	5	5	10	39	—	—	—	—	—
1979–80	Jokerit	FIN	35	3	10	13	69	—	—	—	—	—
1980–81	Ilves	FIN	35	0	4	4	40	2	0	0	0	6
1981–82	Ilves	FIN	16	1	1	2	20	—	—	—	—	—
IHL totals			276	24	122	146	270	34	8	10	18	24
NHL totals			4	0	0	0	0	—	—	—	—	—
