= Ed Gilbert (ice hockey) =

Canadian ice hockey player

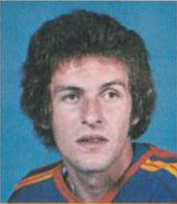
- Gilbert in 1974 stamp
- Born: March 12, 1952 (age 74) Hamilton, Ontario, Canada
- Height: 6 ft 0 in (183 cm)
- Weight: 185 lb (84 kg; 13 st 3 lb)
- Position: Centre
- Shot: Left
- Played for: Pittsburgh Penguins; Kansas City Scouts
- NHL draft: 46th overall, 1972; Montreal Canadiens
- Playing career: 1972–1979

Edward Ferguson Gilbert (born March 12, 1952) is a Canadian former professional ice hockey forward who played 166 games in the National Hockey League (NHL) for the Kansas City Scouts and Pittsburgh Penguins. He also played 29 games in the World Hockey Association for the Cincinnati Stingers.

== Career statistics ==
			Regular Season					Playoffs
Season	Team	League	GP	G	A	Pts	PIM	GP	G	A	Pts	PIM
1969–70	Hamilton Red Wings	OHA	43	8	17	25	10	—	—	—	—	—
1970–71	Hamilton Red Wings	OHA	57	20	35	55	28	—	—	—	—	—
1971–72	Hamilton Red Wings	OHA	62	33	41	74	40	—	—	—	—	—
1972–73	Nova Scotia Voyageurs	AHL	72	21	18	39	20	13	4	8	12	2
1973–74	Nova Scotia Voyageurs	AHL	75	30	44	74	40	6	0	2	2	0
1974–75	Kansas City Scouts	NHL	80	16	22	38	14	—	—	—	—	—
1975–76	Kansas City Scouts	NHL	41	4	8	12	8	—	—	—	—	—
1975–76	Pittsburgh Penguins	NHL	38	1	1	2	0	—	—	—	—	—
1976–77	Hershey Bears	AHL	68	20	29	49	12	6	1	0	1	0
1976–77	Pittsburgh Penguins	NHL	7	0	0	0	0	—	—	—	—	—
1978–79	Cincinnati Stingers	WHA	29	3	3	6	40	—	—	—	—	—
WHA totals			29	3	3	6	40	—	—	—	—	—
NHL totals			166	21	31	52	22	—	—	—	—	—
