= Roger Lemelin (ice hockey) =

Canadian ice hockey defenceman

- Born: February 6, 1954 Iroquois Falls, Ontario, Canada
- Died: September 17, 2023 (aged 69) Woodstock, Ontario, Canada
- Height: 6 ft 3 in (191 cm)
- Weight: 215 lb (98 kg; 15 st 5 lb)
- Position: Defence
- Shot: Right
- Played for: Kansas City Scouts; Colorado Rockies
- NHL draft: 56th overall, 1974; Kansas City Scouts
- WHA draft: 27th overall, 1974; Toronto Toros
- Playing career: 1974–1984

Roger Marcel Lemelin (February 6, 1954 - September 17, 2023) was a Canadian professional ice hockey defenceman who played 36 games in the National Hockey League for the Kansas City Scouts and the Colorado Rockies between 1974 and 1978. The rest of his career was spent in the minor leagues, mainly the American Hockey League (AHL).

== Early life ==
Lemelin was born in Iroquois Falls. He played junior hockey with the London Knights of the Ontario Hockey Association for two seasons.

== Career ==
Lemelin was selected by the Kansas City Scouts in the 1974 NHL amateur draft, and by the Toronto Toros of the World Hockey Association in the 1974 WHA Amateur Draft.

Opting to sign with the Scouts, Lemelin made his professional debut that year, though primarily played in the AHL. Over the next four seasons, he remained in the AHL, while briefly appearing for the Scouts and later Rockies, as the Scouts had moved in 1976 to Colorado. After 1978, Lemelin played a further three seasons in the minor leagues, and after two seasons away played one final season in 1983–84.

== Career statistics ==
=== Regular season and playoffs ===
			Regular season					Playoffs
Season	Team	League	GP	G	A	Pts	PIM	GP	G	A	Pts	PIM
1972–73	London Knights	OHA	62	6	12	18	92	—	—	—	—	—
1973–74	London Knights	OHA	48	10	30	40	100	—	—	—	—	—
1974–75	Kansas City Scouts	NHL	8	0	1	1	6	—	—	—	—	—
1974–75	Baltimore Clippers	AHL	36	1	13	14	59	—	—	—	—	—
1974–75	Springfield Indians	AHL	23	1	3	4	24	17	2	2	4	36
1975–76	Kansas City Scouts	NHL	11	0	0	0	0	—	—	—	—	—
1975–76	Springfield Indians	NHL	53	4	14	18	83	—	—	—	—	—
1976–77	Colorado Rockies	NHL	14	1	1	2	21	—	—	—	—	—
1976–77	Rhode Island Reds	AHL	47	2	8	10	73	—	—	—	—	—
1977–78	Colorado Rockies	NHL	3	0	0	0	0	—	—	—	—	—
1977–78	Phoenix Roadrunners	CHL	27	1	5	6	72	—	—	—	—	—
1977–78	Hampton Gulls	AHL	16	1	4	5	22	—	—	—	—	—
1977–78	Philadelphia Firebirds	AHL	33	0	5	5	52	—	—	—	—	—
1978–79	Hampton Aces	NEHL	38	4	12	16	109	—	—	—	—	—
1979–80	Hampton Aces	EHL	5	0	1	1	20	—	—	—	—	—
1979–80	Hershey Bears	AHL	3	0	1	1	2	15	0	1	1	62
1980–81	Hershey Bears	AHL	12	0	2	2	14	—	—	—	—	—
1980–81	Oklahoma City Stars	CHL	11	0	1	1	6	—	—	—	—	—
1980–81	Hampton Aces	EHL	21	0	6	6	24	—	—	—	—	—
1983–84	Muskegon Mohawks	IHL	57	3	13	16	65	—	—	—	—	—
AHL totals			223	9	50	59	329	32	2	3	5	98
NHL totals			36	1	2	3	27	—	—	—	—	—
