= Hugh Harvey =

Canadian ice hockey player

- Born: June 25, 1949 (age 75); Kingston, Ontario, Canada
- Height: 6 ft 0 in (183 cm)
- Weight: 175 lb (79 kg; 12 st 7 lb)
- Position: Left wing
- Shot: Left
- Played for: Kansas City Scouts
- Playing career: 1969–1976

Lionel Hugh Harvey (born June 25, 1949) is a Canadian retired ice hockey forward who played 18 games in the National Hockey League for the Kansas City Scouts between 1974 and 1976. The rest of career, which lasted from 1969 to 1976, was mainly spent in the minor leagues.

== Career statistics ==
=== Regular season and playoffs ===
			Regular season					Playoffs
Season	Team	League	GP	G	A	Pts	PIM	GP	G	A	Pts	PIM
1969–70	Kingston Aces	OHA Sr	27	17	16	33	51	—	—	—	—	—
1970–71	Oklahoma City Blazers	CHL	70	9	18	27	105	5	0	1	1	0
1971–72	Oklahoma City Blazers	CHL	10	2	3	5	20	—	—	—	—	—
1971–72	Dayton Gems	IHL	50	32	25	57	57	5	2	0	2	8
1972–73	Hershey Bears	AHL	70	23	27	50	89	7	6	2	8	2
1973–74	Hershey Bears	AHL	76	28	38	66	101	14	2	3	5	8
1974–75	Kansas City Scouts	NHL	8	0	0	0	2	—	—	—	—	—
1974–75	Baltimore Clippers	AHL	36	4	11	15	30	—	—	—	—	—
1974–75	Fort Worth Texans	CHL	28	9	9	18	20	—	—	—	—	—
1975–76	Kansas City Scouts	NHL	10	1	1	2	2	—	—	—	—	—
1975–76	Springfield Indians	AHL	44	15	9	24	49	—	—	—	—	—
1975–76	Baltimore Clippers	AHL	16	7	1	8	10	—	—	—	—	—
AHL totals			242	77	86	163	279	21	8	5	13	10
NHL totals			18	1	1	2	4	—	—	—	—	—
