= Peter McDuffe =

Canadian ice hockey player

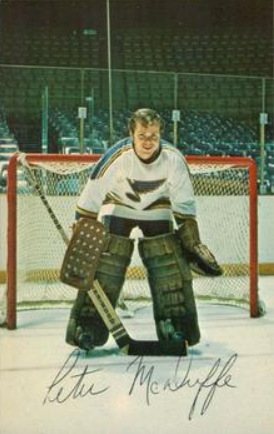
- McDuffe in 1971 photo
- Born: February 16, 1948 Milton, Ontario, Canada
- Height: 5 ft 11 in (180 cm)
- Weight: 175 lb (79 kg; 12 st 7 lb)
- Position: Goaltender
- Caught: Left
- Played for: St. Louis Blues; New York Rangers; Kansas City Scouts; Detroit Red Wings; Indianapolis Racers
- Playing career: 1964–1978

Peter Arnold McDuffe (born February 16, 1948) is a Canadian former ice hockey goaltender who played for the St. Louis Blues, New York Rangers, Kansas City Scouts and Detroit Red Wings in the National Hockey League (NHL) and the Indianapolis Racers in the World Hockey Association (WHA) between 1971 and 1978.

== Early life ==
Born in Milton, Ontario, McDuffe's father, Arnold, was a test pilot and trainer for the Royal Canadian Air Force during World War II stationed at Brandon, Manitoba. In 1920, McDuffe's paternal grandfather, Richard, had established the first John Deere farm implement dealership in Ontario. (Icing on the Plains: The Rough Ride of Kansas City's NHL Scouts, pp. 110–111)

McDuffe made the move from defence to goaltender in peewee around 1958. McDuffe began his junior career in St. Catharines with a Junior B team before being promoted to the A team with the St. Catharines Blackhawks of the OHA in 1964–65, where he played parts of four seasons. In his last season in St. Catharines, McDuffe won the best goaltending award with a 2.92 GAA.

== Career ==
In 1966–67, he was called up and started two games with the Buffalo Bisons of the American Hockey League.

In 1968–69, he moved to the EHL and played for the Greensboro Generals, where he collected a 36-19-9 record, before being traded to New York Rangers affiliate Omaha in the Central Hockey League.

In the summer of 1970, McDuffe served as a coach at Hockey Haven, a hockey school in Haliburton, Ontario, with NHLers Jim Dorey, Brian Watson, Bill Goldsworthy, and Phil Myre.

McDuffe made the second all-star team with Omaha in 1969–70, and the first all-star team in 1970–71, leading them to championships both seasons. He won the 1970–71 Central Hockey League Most Valuable Player award with the Omaha Knights. He also won the 1971–72 Western Hockey League Leading Goaltender Award with the Denver Spurs.

McDuffe got his first taste of NHL action with the St. Louis Blues, although he was happy to return to the New York Rangers system the following season, stating about the coaching, "In St. Louis, they don't tell you which end of the stick to hold."

Between 1971 and 1976, he played in 57 NHL regular season games with a goals-against average of 4.08.

== Honours ==
He became one of the first inductees in his hometown of Milton, Ontario's Walk of Fame in 2007.

In 2017, he was inducted into the Milton Sports Hall of Fame.

== Career statistics ==
=== Regular season and playoffs ===
			Regular season									Playoffs
Season	Team	League	GP	W	L	T	MIN	GA	SO	GAA	SV%	GP	W	L	MIN	GA	SO	GAA	SV%
1964–65	St. Catharines Black Hawks	OHA	2	0	1	0	80	9	0	9.62	—	—	—	—	—	—	—	—	—
1965–66	St. Catharines Black Hawks	OHA	21	—	—	—	1260	112	0	5.33	—	—	—	—	—	—	—	—	—
1966–67	St. Catharines Black Hawks	OHA	30	—	—	—	1840	90	2	2.93	—	6	—	—	360	26	0	4.33	—
1966–67	Buffalo Bisons	AHL	2	0	2	0	120	13	0	6.50	—	—	—	—	—	—	—	—	—
1967–68	St. Catharines Black Hawks	OHA	50	—	—	—	3036	192	0	3.79	—	5	—	—	300	34	0	6.80	—
1968–69	Greensboro Generals	EHL	65	—	—	—	3900	246	4	3.78	—	8	—	—	480	28	0	3.50	—
1969–70	Omaha Knights	CHL	59	26	24	9	3500	174	2	2.98	—	12	8	4	720	31	1	2.58	—
1970–71	Omaha Knights	CHL	57	—	—	—	3420	57	3	2.77	—	11	8	3	692	26	2	2.36	—
1971–72	St. Louis Blues	NHL	10	0	6	0	471	29	0	3.69	.889	1	0	1	60	7	0	7.00	.816
1971–72	Denver Spurs	WHL	21	10	7	2	1126	65	1	3.46	—	4	4	0	240	6	1	1.50	—
1972–73	New York Rangers	NHL	1	1	0	0	60	1	0	1.00	.962	—	—	—	—	—	—	—	—
1973–74	New York Rangers	NHL	6	3	2	1	340	18	0	3.18	904	—	—	—	—	—	—	—	—
1973–74	Providence Reds	AHL	36	17	12	6	2098	123	0	3.51	—	14	8	6	883	45	1	3.05	—
1974–75	Kansas City Scouts	NHL	36	7	25	4	2098	148	0	4.23	.883	—	—	—	—	—	—	—	—
1975–76	Detroit Red Wings	NHL	4	0	3	1	239	22	0	5.53	.858	—	—	—	—	—	—	—	—
1975–76	New Haven Nighthawks	AHL	21	8	9	3	1245	85	0	4.10	.880	1	0	1	60	4	0	4.00	—
1976–77	Rhode Island Reds	AHL	11	—	—	—	621	46	0	4.44	.881	—	—	—	—	—	—	—	—
1976–77	New Haven Nighthawks	AHL	11	—	—	—	323	32	0	5.94	.823	—	—	—	—	—	—	—	—
1977–78	Indianapolis Racers	WHA	12	1	6	1	539	39	0	4.34	.875	—	—	—	—	—	—	—	—
1979–80	Georgetown Gyros	GBSHL	32	—	—	—	1920	141	0	4.41	—	—	—	—	—	—	—	—	—
1980–81	Georgetown Gyros	OHA Sr	34	—	—	—	2060	111	0	3.23	—	—	—	—	—	—	—	—	—
WHA totals			12	1	6	1	539	39	0	4.34	.875	5	1	3	260	19	0	4.38	—
NHL totals			57	11	36	6	3209	218	0	4.08	.885	1	0	1	60	7	0	7.00	.816

Preceded by Dan Johnson	CHL Most Valuable Player Award; 1970–71^{shared with Andre Dupont; Gerry Ouellette; Joe Zanussi}	Succeeded by Gregg Sheppard
