= Claude Houde =

Canadian ice hockey player

- Born: December 16, 1947 (age 77); Drummondville, Quebec, Canada
- Height: 6 ft 1 in (185 cm)
- Weight: 188 lb (85 kg; 13 st 6 lb)
- Position: Defenceman
- Shot: Left
- Played for: Kansas City Scouts
- Playing career: 1970–1977

Claude Daniel Houde (born November 8, 1947) is a Canadian retired professional ice hockey defenceman who played 59 games in the National Hockey League for the Kansas City Scouts from 1974 to 1976. Most of his career, which lasted from 1970 to 1977, was spent in the minor leagues, mainly in the American Hockey League. As a youth, he played in the 1960 and 1961 Quebec International Pee-Wee Hockey Tournaments with Drummondville.

== Career statistics ==
=== Regular season and playoffs ===
			Regular season					Playoffs
Season	Team	League	GP	G	A	Pts	PIM	GP	G	A	Pts	PIM
1965–66	Arvida Indians	QC-Jr. A	—	—	—	—	—	—	—	—	—	—
1966–67	Arvida Indians	QC-Jr. A	—	—	—	—	—	—	—	—	—	—
1966–67	Saint-Jérôme Alouettes	MMJHL	—	—	—	—	—	—	—	—	—	—
1967–68	Arvida Indians	QC-Jr. A	—	—	—	—	—	—	—	—	—	—
1968–69	Granby Bisons	Que-Sr	51	15	30	45	—	—	—	—	—	—
1969–70	Granby Bisons	Que-Sr	—	—	—	—	—	—	—	—	—	—
1970–71	Syracuse Blazers	EHL	65	15	20	35	62	6	1	0	1	0
1971–72	Providence Reds	AHL	54	3	9	12	26	5	0	0	0	5
1972–73	Toledo Hornets	IHL	22	7	4	11	20	—	—	—	—	—
1972–73	Providence Reds	AHL	55	9	14	23	22	3	0	1	1	10
1973–74	Baltimore Clippers	AHL	62	7	17	24	30	—	—	—	—	—
1973–74	Virginia Wings	AHL	14	2	3	5	6	—	—	—	—	—
1974–75	Virginia Wings	AHL	25	1	1	2	26	—	—	—	—	—
1974–75	Kansas City Scouts	NHL	34	3	4	7	20	—	—	—	—	—
1975–76	Kansas City Scouts	NHL	25	0	2	2	20	—	—	—	—	—
1975–76	Springfield Indians	AHL	29	5	9	14	24	—	—	—	—	—
1976–77	Beauce Jaros	NAHL	22	6	16	22	10	—	—	—	—	—
AHL totals			239	27	53	80	134	8	0	1	1	15
NHL totals			59	3	6	9	40	—	—	—	—	—
