= Chris Evans (ice hockey) =

Canadian ice hockey player

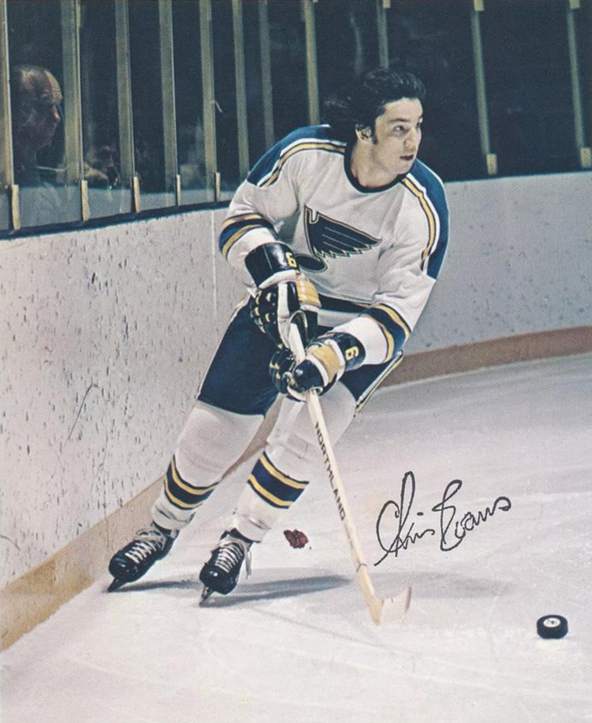
- Evans in action for St. Louis Blues in 1972
- Born: September 14, 1946 Toronto, Ontario, Canada
- Died: May 9, 2000 (aged 53) Phoenix, Arizona, U.S.
- Height: 5 ft 9 in (175 cm)
- Weight: 180 lb (82 kg; 12 st 12 lb)
- Position: Defence
- Shot: Left
- Played for: Toronto Maple Leafs; Buffalo Sabres; St. Louis Blues; Detroit Red Wings; Kansas City Scouts; Calgary Cowboys (WHA); Birmingham Bulls (WHA); Quebec Nordiques (WHA)
- Playing career: 1968–1981

Christopher Bruce Evans (September 14, 1946 – May 9, 2000) was a Canadian professional ice hockey defenceman.

== Career ==
Evans played in the National Hockey League with the Toronto Maple Leafs, Buffalo Sabres, St. Louis Blues, Detroit Red Wings, and Kansas City Scouts. He played in the World Hockey Association with the Calgary Cowboys, Birmingham Bulls, and Quebec Nordiques.

In his WHA career, Evans appeared in 204 games. He scored eleven goals and added 51 assists. He also played in 241 NHL games, scoring nineteen goals and adding 42 assists.

== Career statistics ==
=== Regular season and playoffs ===
| | | | Regular season | | | | | Playoffs |
| Season | Team | League | GP | G | A | Pts | PIM | GP | G | A | Pts | PIM |
|---|---|---|---|---|---|---|---|---|---|---|---|---|
| 1965–66 | Markham Waxers | MetJHL | 30 | 12 | 24 | 36 | — | — | — | — | — | — |
| 1966–67 | Toronto Marlboros | OHA | 48 | 7 | 21 | 28 | 84 | 17 | 2 | 3 | 5 | 34 |
| 1967–68 | Toronto Marlboros | OHA | 39 | 5 | 14 | 19 | 42 | — | — | — | — | — |
| 1967–68 | Tulsa Oilers | CHL | 2 | 0 | 0 | 0 | 0 | — | — | — | — | — |
| 1968–69 | Tulsa Oilers | CHL | 70 | 9 | 35 | 44 | 88 | 7 | 0 | 3 | 3 | 6 |
| 1969–70 | Toronto Maple Leafs | NHL | 2 | 0 | 0 | 0 | 0 | — | — | — | — | — |
| 1969–70 | Phoenix Roadrunners | WHL | 70 | 7 | 16 | 23 | 60 | — | — | — | — | — |
| 1970–71 | Kansas City Blues | CHL | 71 | 10 | 32 | 42 | 111 | — | — | — | — | — |
| 1971–72 | Buffalo Sabres | NHL | 61 | 6 | 18 | 24 | 98 | — | — | — | — | — |
| 1971–72 | Cincinnati Swords | AHL | 5 | 0 | 5 | 5 | 2 | — | — | — | — | — |
| 1971–72 | St. Louis Blues | NHL | 2 | 0 | 0 | 0 | 0 | 7 | 1 | 0 | 1 | 4 |
| 1972–73 | St. Louis Blues | NHL | 77 | 9 | 12 | 21 | 31 | 5 | 0 | 1 | 1 | 4 |
| 1973–74 | St. Louis Blues | NHL | 54 | 4 | 7 | 11 | 8 | — | — | — | — | — |
| 1973–74 | Detroit Red Wings | NHL | 23 | 0 | 2 | 2 | 2 | — | — | — | — | — |
| 1974–75 | Kansas City Scouts | NHL | 2 | 0 | 2 | 2 | 2 | — | — | — | — | — |
| 1974–75 | St. Louis Blues | NHL | 20 | 0 | 1 | 1 | 2 | — | — | — | — | — |
| 1974–75 | Denver Spurs | CHL | 31 | 3 | 13 | 16 | 47 | 2 | 1 | 1 | 2 | 2 |
| 1975–76 | Calgary Cowboys | WHA | 75 | 3 | 20 | 23 | 50 | 10 | 5 | 5 | 10 | 4 |
| 1976–77 | Calgary Cowboys | WHA | 81 | 7 | 27 | 34 | 60 | — | — | — | — | — |
| 1977–78 | Birmingham Bulls | WHA | 12 | 1 | 2 | 3 | 4 | 7 | 2 | 0 | 2 | 2 |
| 1977–78 | Quebec Nordiques | WHA | 36 | 0 | 2 | 2 | 22 | — | — | — | — | — |
| 1978–79 | Phoenix Roadrunners | PHL | 57 | 9 | 41 | 50 | 46 | — | — | — | — | — |
| 1979–80 | ECD Iserlohn | GER | — | — | — | — | — | — | — | — | — | — |
| 1980–81 | Wichita Wind | CHL | 6 | 1 | 2 | 3 | 14 | — | — | — | — | — |
| 1980–81 | ECD Iserlohn | GER-2 | 19 | 3 | 7 | 10 | 59 | — | — | — | — | — |
| WHA totals | | | 204 | 11 | 51 | 62 | 136 | 10 | 5 | 5 | 10 | 4 |
| NHL totals | | | 241 | 19 | 42 | 61 | 143 | 12 | 1 | 1 | 2 | 8 |
