= Ted Snell =

Canadian ice hockey player

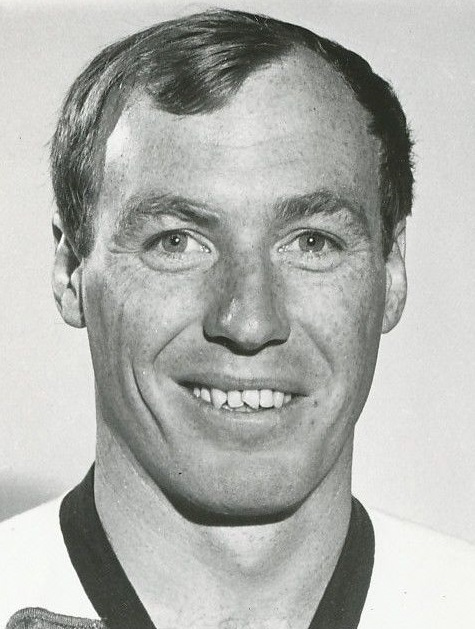
- Snell in 1973
- Born: May 28, 1946 (age 78); Ottawa, Ontario, Canada
- Height: 5 ft 10 in (178 cm)
- Weight: 200 lb (91 kg; 14 st 4 lb)
- Position: Right wing
- Shot: Right
- Played for: Kansas City Scouts; Pittsburgh Penguins; Detroit Red Wings
- Playing career: 1965–1976

Harold Edward Snell (born May 28, 1946) is a Canadian former professional ice hockey forward who played 104 games in the National Hockey League for the Kansas City Scouts, Pittsburgh Penguins, and Detroit Red Wings between 1973 and 1975. The rest of his career, which lasted from 1965 to 1988, was mainly spent with the Hershey Bears of the American Hockey League, though he spent the last seven seasons playing in Switzerland, serving as a player-coach for part of it before retiring and coaching full-time.

== Career statistics ==
=== Regular season and playoffs ===
| | | | Regular season | | | | | Playoffs |
| Season | Team | League | GP | G | A | Pts | PIM | GP | G | A | Pts | PIM |
|---|---|---|---|---|---|---|---|---|---|---|---|---|
| 1962–63 | Niagara Falls Flyers | OHA | 50 | 20 | 20 | 40 | 17 | 9 | 0 | 3 | 3 | 2 |
| 1963–64 | Niagara Falls Flyers | OHA | 56 | 13 | 27 | 40 | 43 | 4 | 0 | 1 | 1 | 12 |
| 1964–65 | Niagara Falls Flyers | OHA | 56 | 26 | 23 | 49 | 26 | 11 | 3 | 7 | 10 | 10 |
| 1965–66 | Niagara Falls Flyers | OHA | 47 | 18 | 25 | 43 | 73 | 6 | 2 | 1 | 3 | 4 |
| 1965–66 | Hershey Bears | AHL | 4 | 1 | 0 | 1 | 2 | — | — | — | — | — |
| 1965–66 | Oklahoma City Blazers | CHL | — | — | — | — | — | 1 | 0 | 0 | 0 | 0 |
| 1966–67 | Hershey Bears | AHL | 34 | 4 | 8 | 12 | 4 | 1 | 0 | 0 | 0 | 0 |
| 1967–68 | Hershey Bears | AHL | 67 | 11 | 29 | 40 | 23 | 5 | 0 | 0 | 0 | 0 |
| 1968–69 | Hershey Bears | AHL | 20 | 4 | 5 | 9 | 4 | 11 | 4 | 5 | 9 | 2 |
| 1968–69 | Phoenix Roadrunners | WHL | 54 | 6 | 9 | 15 | 25 | — | — | — | — | — |
| 1969–70 | Hershey Bears | AHL | 58 | 12 | 23 | 35 | 24 | 7 | 3 | 4 | 7 | 0 |
| 1970–71 | Hershey Bears | AHL | 72 | 12 | 28 | 40 | 13 | 4 | 1 | 0 | 1 | 0 |
| 1971–72 | Hershey Bears | AHL | 68 | 12 | 18 | 30 | 4 | 4 | 0 | 0 | 0 | 2 |
| 1972–73 | Hershey Bears | AHL | 72 | 29 | 35 | 64 | 23 | 6 | 0 | 3 | 3 | 0 |
| 1973–74 | Pittsburgh Penguins | NHL | 55 | 4 | 12 | 16 | 8 | — | — | — | — | — |
| 1974–75 | Detroit Red Wings | NHL | 20 | 0 | 4 | 4 | 6 | — | — | — | — | — |
| 1974–75 | Kansas City Scouts | NHL | 29 | 3 | 2 | 5 | 8 | — | — | — | — | — |
| 1974–75 | Virginia Wings | AHL | 24 | 5 | 3 | 8 | 17 | 5 | 1 | 0 | 1 | 0 |
| 1975–76 | Hershey Bears | AHL | 74 | 4 | 15 | 19 | 24 | 10 | 0 | 0 | 0 | 0 |
| 1979–80 | SC Langenthal | NLB | — | — | — | — | — | — | — | — | — | — |
| 1981–82 | SC Langenthal | NLB | — | — | — | — | — | — | — | — | — | — |
| 1982–83 | SC Langenthal | NLB | — | 17 | 10 | 27 | — | — | — | — | — | — |
| 1983–84 | EHC Grindelwald | SUI-3 | — | 21 | 12 | 33 | — | — | — | — | — | — |
| 1984–85 | EHC Grindelwald | SUI-3 | — | 21 | 12 | 33 | — | — | — | — | — | — |
| 1985–86 | EHC Grindelwald | SUI-3 | — | — | — | — | — | — | — | — | — | — |
| 1987–88 | EHC Solothurn-Zuchwil | SUI-3 | — | — | — | — | — | — | — | — | — | — |
| AHL totals | | | 493 | 94 | 164 | 258 | 138 | 53 | 9 | 12 | 21 | 4 |
| NHL totals | | | 104 | 7 | 18 | 25 | 22 | — | — | — | — | — |
