= Larry Giroux =

Canadian ice hockey player

- Born: August 28, 1951 (age 74) Weyburn, Saskatchewan, Canada
- Height: 6 ft 0 in (183 cm)
- Weight: 190 lb (86 kg; 13 st 8 lb)
- Position: Defence
- Shot: Left
- Played for: St. Louis Blues; Detroit Red Wings; Kansas City Scouts; Hartford Whalers
- NHL draft: Undrafted
- Playing career: 1971–1980

Lawrence Douglas Giroux (born August 28, 1951) is a Canadian former professional ice hockey defenceman.

Born in Weyburn, Saskatchewan, Giroux started his National Hockey League career with the St. Louis Blues in 1974. He also played for the Kansas City Scouts, Detroit Red Wings, and Hartford Whalers. He retired after the 1980 season. He was known as "the buffalo" for his 1970s-styled hair and side burns. Commonly referred to as "Buff".

== Career statistics ==
=== Regular season and playoffs ===
| | | | Regular season | | | | | Playoffs |
| Season | Team | League | GP | G | A | Pts | PIM | GP | G | A | Pts | PIM |
|---|---|---|---|---|---|---|---|---|---|---|---|---|
| 1967–68 | Weyburn Red Wings | WCHL | 2 | 0 | 0 | 0 | 0 | — | — | — | — | — |
| 1969–70 | Weyburn Red Wings | SJHL | 36 | 14 | 33 | 47 | 96 | 22 | 5 | 16 | 21 | 31 |
| 1970–71 | Swift Current Broncos | WCHL | 62 | 14 | 28 | 42 | 173 | — | — | — | — | — |
| 1971–72 | Des Moines Oak Leafs | IHL | 5 | 0 | 1 | 1 | 6 | — | — | — | — | — |
| 1972–73 | Denver Spurs | WHL | 2 | 0 | 1 | 1 | 2 | — | — | — | — | — |
| 1972–73 | Fort Worth Wings | CHL | 72 | 5 | 42 | 47 | 130 | 4 | 0 | 0 | 0 | 24 |
| 1973–74 | St. Louis Blues | NHL | 74 | 5 | 17 | 22 | 59 | — | — | — | — | — |
| 1974–75 | Kansas City Scouts | NHL | 21 | 0 | 6 | 6 | 24 | — | — | — | — | — |
| 1974–75 | Denver Spurs | CHL | 10 | 1 | 6 | 7 | 37 | — | — | — | — | — |
| 1974–75 | Detroit Red Wings | NHL | 39 | 2 | 20 | 22 | 60 | — | — | — | — | — |
| 1974–75 | Virginia Wings | AHL | 14 | 3 | 10 | 13 | 31 | — | — | — | — | — |
| 1975–76 | Detroit Red Wings | NHL | 10 | 1 | 1 | 2 | 25 | — | — | — | — | — |
| 1975–76 | New Haven Nighthawks | AHL | 67 | 1 | 24 | 25 | 121 | 3 | 0 | 0 | 0 | 6 |
| 1976–77 | Detroit Red Wings | NHL | 2 | 0 | 0 | 0 | 2 | — | — | — | — | — |
| 1976–77 | Kansas City Blues | CHL | 75 | 11 | 34 | 45 | 194 | 10 | 0 | 8 | 8 | 25 |
| 1977–78 | Detroit Red Wings | NHL | 5 | 0 | 3 | 3 | 4 | 2 | 0 | 0 | 0 | 2 |
| 1977–78 | Kansas City Red Wings | CHL | 73 | 11 | 49 | 60 | 256 | — | — | — | — | — |
| 1978–79 | St. Louis Blues | NHL | 73 | 5 | 22 | 27 | 111 | — | — | — | — | — |
| 1979–80 | St. Louis Blues | NHL | 3 | 0 | 0 | 0 | 4 | — | — | — | — | — |
| 1979–80 | Salt Lake Golden Eagles | CHL | 5 | 0 | 1 | 1 | 2 | — | — | — | — | — |
| 1979–80 | Hartford Whalers | NHL | 47 | 2 | 5 | 7 | 44 | 3 | 0 | 0 | 0 | 2 |
| 1979–80 | Springfield Indians | AHL | 5 | 0 | 1 | 1 | 14 | — | — | — | — | — |
| NHL totals | | | 274 | 15 | 74 | 89 | 333 | 5 | 0 | 0 | 0 | 4 |
