= Lynn Powis =

Canadian ice hockey player

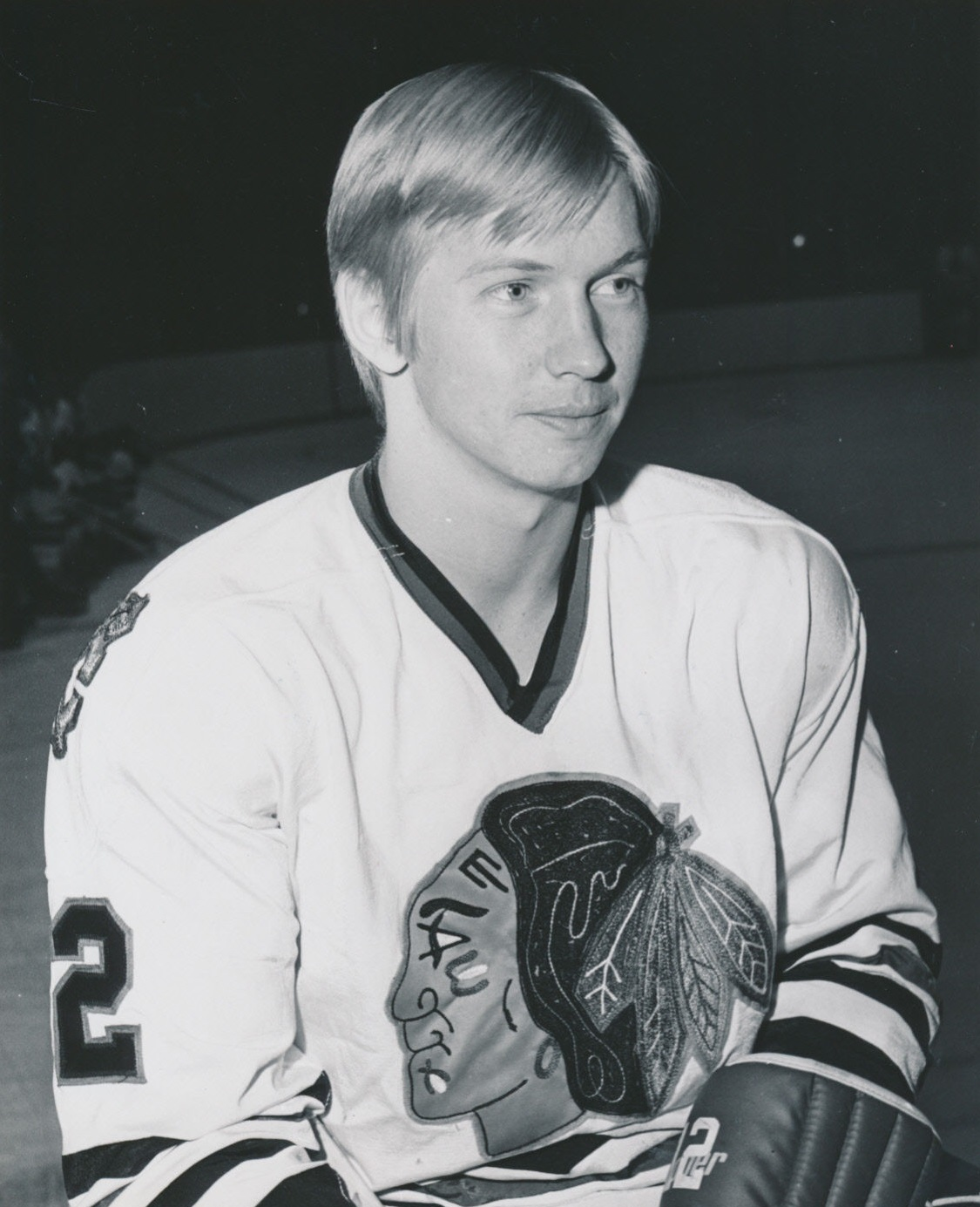
- Powis in 1973
- Born: July 7, 1949 (age 76) Saskatoon, Saskatchewan, Canada
- Height: 6 ft 0 in (183 cm)
- Weight: 185 lb (84 kg; 13 st 3 lb)
- Position: Centre
- Shot: Left
- Played for: Kansas City Scouts; Chicago Black Hawks; Calgary Cowboys; Indianapolis Racers; Winnipeg Jets; EV Füssen
- NHL draft: 68th overall, 1969; Montreal Canadiens
- Playing career: 1970–1983

Trevor Lynn Powis (born July 7, 1949) is a Canadian former professional ice hockey player. Powis played for several teams in the National Hockey League, World Hockey Association and the German Eishockey-Bundesliga between 1970 and 1983.

== Playing career ==
Powis was born in Saskatoon, Saskatchewan, Canada. His brother is Geoff Powis, who also played professional ice hockey. He played junior ice hockey with the Melville Millionaires and the Moose Jaw Canucks. Choosing university, Powis attended the University of Denver, starting in 1968. After one year, he was drafted by the Montreal Canadiens, 68th overall in the NHL Amateur Draft.

Powis played one more season at Denver, then turned professional in 1970 with the Denver Spurs of the Western Hockey League. Powis played on season for the Canadiens' American Hockey League affiliate Nova Scotia Voyageurs before being traded to the Atlanta Flames. Powis played one season with the Flames' Omaha Knights affiliate, then was traded to the Chicago Black Hawks. Powis made his NHL debut in 1973 with the Black Hawks, and played 57 games in the 1973–74 season with the Black Hawks, recording 8 goals and 13 assists.

In 1974, Powis was claimed by the Kansas City Scouts in the 1974 Expansion Draft. He played the 1974–75 season for Kansas City, before being traded in the off-season to the St. Louis Blues. Powis did not play again in the NHL. After being waived by St. Louis, Powis signed with the Calgary Cowboys of the World Hockey Association. He would go on to also play with the Indianapolis Racers and the Winnipeg Jets. Powis was a member of the championship 1978 Jets team.

In 1978, Powis moved to Germany and played four seasons in the Eishockey-Bundesliga for Duisburger SC and EV Füssen. He finished his career with one season in the Italian League for Alleghe, retiring in 1983.

In total, Powis played 130 games in the National Hockey League, scoring 19 goals and 33 assists. He played 153 games in the World Hockey Association scoring 50 goals and 65 assists.

After retirement from ice hockey, Powis has worked in real estate in the Denver area.

== Career statistics ==
=== Regular season and playoffs ===
			Regular season					Playoffs
Season	Team	League	GP	G	A	Pts	PIM	GP	G	A	Pts	PIM
1965–66	Melville Millionaires	SJHL	43	0	2	2	4	—	—	—	—	—
1966–67	Moose Jaw Canucks	CMJHL	52	13	18	31	17	14	5	4	9	4
1967–68	University of Denver	WCHA	—	—	—	—	—	—	—	—	—	—
1968–69	University of Denver	WCHA	30	17	12	29	21	—	—	—	—	—
1969–70	University of Denver	WCHA	5	2	3	5	12	—	—	—	—	—
1970–71	Denver Spurs	WHL	59	14	13	27	13	—	—	—	—	—
1971–72	Nova Scotia Voyageurs	AHL	38	5	6	11	19	15	0	2	2	0
1972–73	Omaha Knights	CHL	72	34	40	74	49	11	2	5	7	8
1973–74	Chicago Black Hawks	NHL	57	8	13	21	6	1	0	0	0	0
1974–75	Kansas City Scouts	NHL	73	11	20	31	19	—	—	—	—	—
1975–76	Providence Reds	AHL	52	30	31	61	54	—	—	—	—	—
1975–76	Calgary Cowboys	WHA	21	4	10	14	2	10	5	4	9	12
1976–77	Calgary Cowboys	WHA	63	30	30	60	40	—	—	—	—	—
1977–78	Indianapolis Racers	WHA	14	4	6	10	2	—	—	—	—	—
1977–78	Winnipeg Jets	WHA	55	12	19	31	16	3	2	1	3	7
1978–79	Duisburger SC	GER-2	56	52	36	88	254	—	—	—	—	—
1979–80	Duisburger SC	GER	39	28	37	65	162	—	—	—	—	—
1980–81	Duisburger SC	GER	18	12	12	24	62	—	—	—	—	—
1981–82	EV Füssen	GER	32	17	22	39	82	—	—	—	—	—
1982–83	Alleghe	ITA	19	17	26	43	18	—	—	—	—	—
WHA totals			153	50	65	115	60	13	7	5	12	19
NHL totals			130	19	33	52	25	1	0	0	0	0
