= Doug Buhr =

Canadian ice hockey player

- Born: June 29, 1949; Vancouver, British Columbia, Canada
- Died: October 13, 2006 (aged 57)
- Height: 6 ft 3 in (191 cm)
- Weight: 215 lb (98 kg; 15 st 5 lb)
- Position: Left wing
- Shot: Left
- Played for: Kansas City Scouts
- NHL draft: Undrafted
- Playing career: 1972–1978

Douglas Leonard Buhr (June 29, 1949 in Vancouver, British Columbia – October 13, 2006) was a Canadian ice hockey player. A left wing, he played 6 games in the National Hockey League for the Kansas City Scouts during the 1974–75 season. The rest of his career, which lasted from 1972 to 1978, was spent in the minor leagues, and he finished with several years of senior hockey.

== Career statistics ==
=== Regular season and playoffs ===
			Regular season					Playoffs
Season	Team	League	GP	G	A	Pts	PIM	GP	G	A	Pts	PIM
1968–69	Victoria Cougars	BCJHL	—	—	—	—	—	—	—	—	—	—
1968–69	Nor-Wes Caps	BC-Minor	—	—	—	—	—	—	—	—	—	—
1969–70	University of British Columbia	WUAA	—	—	—	—	—	—	—	—	—	—
1970–71	University of British Columbia	WUAA	—	—	—	—	—	—	—	—	—	—
1971–72	University of British Columbia	WUAA	—	—	—	—	—	—	—	—	—	—
1972–73	Springfield Kings	AHL	71	10	12	22	152	—	—	—	—	—
1973–74	Springfield Kings	AHL	29	2	4	6	42	—	—	—	—	—
1973–74	Portland Buckaroos	WHL	37	1	4	5	117	10	1	0	1	27
1974–75	Kansas City Scouts	NHL	6	0	2	2	4	—	—	—	—	—
1974–75	Springfield Indians	AHL	44	5	6	11	81	—	—	—	—	—
1974–75	Oklahoma City Blazers	CHL	15	3	0	3	48	4	0	0	0	2
1975–76	Trail Smoke Eaters	WIHL	—	—	—	—	—	—	—	—	—	—
1976–77	Trail Smoke Eaters	WIHL	56	12	13	25	162	—	—	—	—	—
1977–78	Trail Smoke Eaters	WIHL	56	11	15	26	76	—	—	—	—	—
AHL totals			144	17	22	39	275	—	—	—	—	—
NHL totals			6	0	2	2	4	—	—	—	—	—
