= Ken Murray (ice hockey) =

Canadian ice hockey player (born 1948)

- Born: January 22, 1948 (age 78) Toronto, Ontario, Canada
- Height: 6 ft 0 in (183 cm)
- Weight: 180 lb (82 kg; 12 st 12 lb)
- Position: Defenceman
- Shot: Right
- Played for: Kansas City Scouts; Toronto Maple Leafs; New York Islanders; Detroit Red Wings
- Playing career: 1968–1979

Kenneth Richard Murray (born January 22, 1948) is a Canadian former professional ice hockey defenceman who played 106 games in the National Hockey League for the Kansas City Scouts, Toronto Maple Leafs, New York Islanders and Detroit Red Wings between 1970 and 1975. The rest of his career lasted from 1968 to 1979 and was spent in the minor leagues, mainly the American Hockey League.

== Career statistics ==
=== Regular season and playoffs ===
			Regular season					Playoffs
Season	Team	League	GP	G	A	Pts	PIM	GP	G	A	Pts	PIM
1968–69	St. Thomas Barons	OHA-B	—	—	—	—	—	—	—	—	—	—
1969–70	Tulsa Oilers	CHL	62	3	13	16	136	6	0	0	0	6
1969–70	Toronto Maple Leafs	NHL	1	0	1	1	2	—	—	—	—	—
1970–71	Toronto Maple Leafs	NHL	4	0	0	0	0	—	—	—	—	—
1970–71	Tulsa Oilers	CHL	62	3	13	16	143	—	—	—	—	—
1971–72	Cincinnati Swords	AHL	68	0	7	7	167	10	0	0	0	14
1972–73	New York Islanders	NHL	39	0	4	4	59	—	—	—	—	—
1972–73	Detroit Red Wings	NHL	31	1	1	2	36	—	—	—	—	—
1973–74	Virginia Wings	AHL	54	3	6	9	159	—	—	—	—	—
1973–74	Seattle Totems	WHL	18	0	9	9	34	—	—	—	—	—
1974–75	Kansas City Scouts	NHL	8	0	2	2	14	—	—	—	—	—
1974–75	Baltimore Clippers	AHL	31	2	3	5	52	—	—	—	—	—
1974–75	Springfield Indians	AHL	29	1	9	10	91	15	3	5	8	30
1975–76	Kansas City Scouts	NHL	23	0	2	2	24	—	—	—	—	—
1975–76	Springfield Indians	AHL	42	5	16	21	72	—	—	—	—	—
1976–77	Rhode Island Reds	AHL	59	1	9	10	107	—	—	—	—	—
1977–78	New Haven Nighthawks	AHL	68	2	12	14	84	15	0	1	1	22
1978–79	Philadelphia Firebirds	AHL	3	0	0	0	2	—	—	—	—	—
AHL totals			354	14	62	76	734	40	3	6	9	66
NHL totals			106	1	10	11	135	—	—	—	—	—
