= 1974–75 Detroit Red Wings season =

Sports season

1974–75 Detroit Red Wings
- Division: 4th Norris
- Conference: 7th Wales
- 1974–75 record: 23–45–12
- Home record: 17–17–6
- Road record: 6–28–6
- Goals for: 259
- Goals against: 335

Team information
- General manager: Alex Delvecchio
- Coach: Alex Delvecchio
- Captain: Marcel Dionne
- Alternate captains: Mickey Redmond; Bill Hogaboam; Nick Libett; Gary Bergman
- Arena: Detroit Olympia

Team leaders
- Goals: Danny Grant (50)
- Assists: Marcel Dionne (74)
- Points: Marcel Dionne (121)
- Penalty minutes: Bryan Watson (238)
- Wins: Jim Rutherford (20)
- Goals against average: Jim Rutherford (3.75)

The 1974–75 Detroit Red Wings season was the 49th season for the Detroit franchise, 43rd as the Red Wings. The team finished fourth and missed the playoffs for the fifth straight year for the first time in franchise history.

== Regular season ==
=== Final standings ===
Norris Division
		GP	W	L	T	GF	GA	DIFF	Pts
1	Montreal Canadiens	80	47	14	19	374	225	+149	113
2	Los Angeles Kings	80	42	17	21	269	185	+84	105
3	Pittsburgh Penguins	80	37	28	15	326	289	+37	89
4	Detroit Red Wings	80	23	45	12	259	335	−76	58
5	Washington Capitals	80	8	67	5	181	446	−265	21

=== Record vs. opponents ===
Norris Division record vs. opponents

Vs. Wales Conference

Vs. Campbell Conference

Vs. Norris Division

1974–75 NHL records
Team	DET	LAK	MTL	PIT	WSH	Total
Detroit	—	0–5–1	0–4–2	2–4	5–1	7–14–3
Los Angeles	5–0–1	—	1–2–3	3–1–2	5–0–1	14–3–7
Montreal	4–0–2	2–1–3	—	4–1–1	6–0	16–2–6
Pittsburgh	4–2	1–3–2	1–4–1	—	5–1	11–10–3
Washington	1–5	0–5–1	0–6	1–5	—	2–21–1

Vs. Adams Division

1974–75 NHL records
Team	BOS	BUF	CAL	TOR	Total
Detroit	1–4	1–3–1	2–2–1	1–3–1	5–12–3
Los Angeles	3–2	3–1–1	2–1–2	4–0–1	12–4–4
Montreal	3–0–2	0–4–1	5–0	1–2–2	9–6–5
Pittsburgh	1–2–2	0–3–2	4–0–1	4–1	9–6–5
Washington	0–4–1	0–5	2–3	1–4	3–16–1

Vs. Patrick Division

1974–75 NHL records
Team	ATL	NYI	NYR	PHI	Total
Detroit	2–2	2–2	1–2–1	1–2–1	6–8–2
Los Angeles	1–2–1	0–1–3	1–1–2	1–2–1	3–6–7
Montreal	3–0–1	0–2–2	2–0–2	1–2–1	6–4–6
Pittsburgh	1–1–2	2–2	2–2	1–3	6–8–2
Washington	0–3–1	0–4	1–2–1	0–4	1–13–2

Vs. Smythe Division

1974–75 NHL records
Team	CHI	KCS	MIN	STL	VAN	Total
Detroit	1–2–1	3–1	0–2–2	0–3–1	1–3	5–11–4
Los Angeles	2–2	3–1	4–0	3–0–1	1–1–2	13–4–3
Montreal	3–0–1	4–0	4–0	1–2–1	4–0	16–2–2
Pittsburgh	2–1–1	2–0–2	3–1	1–1–2	3–1	11–4–5
Washington	1–3	1–3	0–3–1	0–4	0–4	2–17–1

== Schedule and results ==
1974–75 regular season
October

Game	Result	Date	Score	Opponent	Record
1	W	October 9, 1974	2–1	Chicago Black Hawks (1974–75)	1–0–0
2	L	October 12, 1974	2–7	@ Pittsburgh Penguins (1974–75)	1–1–0
3	W	October 13, 1974	7–3	California Golden Seals (1974–75)	2–1–0
4	W	October 16, 1974	4–2	Atlanta Flames (1974–75)	3–1–0
5	W	October 19, 1974	6–4	Washington Capitals (1974–75)	4–1–0
6	W	October 22, 1974	3–0	@ Washington Capitals (1974–75)	5–1–0
7	L	October 23, 1974	1–10	@ Atlanta Flames (1974–75)	5–2–0
8	L	October 26, 1974	2–4	@ Montreal Canadiens (1974–75)	5–3–0
9	L	October 29, 1974	0–7	@ Vancouver Canucks (1974–75)	5–4–0

November

Game	Result	Date	Score	Opponent	Record
10	T	November 1, 1974	4–4	@ California Golden Seals (1974–75)	5–4–1
11	L	November 2, 1974	1–5	@ Los Angeles Kings (1974–75)	5–5–1
12	T	November 6, 1974	4–4	Montreal Canadiens (1974–75)	5–5–2
13	L	November 10, 1974	2–4	Vancouver Canucks (1974–75)	5–6–2
14	L	November 13, 1974	4–7	@ Minnesota North Stars (1974–75)	5–7–2
15	W	November 16, 1974	5–3	New York Islanders (1974–75)	6–7–2
16	L	November 17, 1974	2–5	Boston Bruins (1974–75)	6–8–2
17	L	November 20, 1974	4–5	New York Rangers (1974–75)	6–9–2
18	L	November 23, 1974	2–4	@ St. Louis Blues (1974–75)	6–10–2
19	L	November 24, 1974	1–4	Los Angeles Kings (1974–75)	6–11–2
20	L	November 27, 1974	2–6	@ Philadelphia Flyers (1974–75)	6–12–2
21	L	November 28, 1974	2–5	@ Buffalo Sabres (1974–75)	6–13–2
22	W	November 30, 1974	1–0	@ Kansas City Scouts (1974–75)	7–13–2

December

Game	Result	Date	Score	Opponent	Record
23	L	December 4, 1974	2–4	@ New York Rangers (1974–75)	7–14–2
24	W	December 5, 1974	6–4	@ Boston Bruins (1974–75)	8–14–2
25	T	December 7, 1974	3–3	@ Toronto Maple Leafs (1974–75)	8–14–3
26	W	December 8, 1974	4–2	Vancouver Canucks (1974–75)	9–14–3
27	L	December 12, 1974	3–4	St. Louis Blues (1974–75)	9–15–3
28	L	December 15, 1974	2–3	Pittsburgh Penguins (1974–75)	9–16–3
29	L	December 18, 1974	5–7	@ Chicago Black Hawks (1974–75)	9–17–3
30	T	December 21, 1974	2–2	Philadelphia Flyers (1974–75)	9–17–4
31	L	December 22, 1974	4–5	@ Boston Bruins (1974–75)	9–18–4
32	T	December 26, 1974	4–4	Minnesota North Stars (1974–75)	9–18–5
33	L	December 27, 1974	1–7	@ Montreal Canadiens (1974–75)	9–19–5
34	L	December 30, 1974	2–3	Los Angeles Kings (1974–75)	9–20–5
35	W	December 31, 1974	4–3	California Golden Seals (1974–75)	10–20–5

January

Game	Result	Date	Score	Opponent	Record
36	L	January 4, 1975	1–2	@ Kansas City Scouts (1974–75)	10–21–5
37	L	January 5, 1975	0–1	Toronto Maple Leafs (1974–75)	10–22–5
38	T	January 8, 1975	4–4	Montreal Canadiens (1974–75)	10–22–6
39	T	January 11, 1975	3–3	Buffalo Sabres (1974–75)	10–22–7
40	L	January 12, 1975	1–2	St. Louis Blues (1974–75)	10–23–7
41	W	January 16, 1975	7–4	Kansas City Scouts (1974–75)	11–23–7
42	L	January 18, 1975	1–5	@ New York Islanders (1974–75)	11–24–7
43	T	January 19, 1975	4–4	Minnesota North Stars (1974–75)	11–24–8
44	L	January 23, 1975	1–5	@ Buffalo Sabres (1974–75)	11–25–8
45	W	January 25, 1975	5–2	Washington Capitals (1974–75)	12–25–8
46	L	January 26, 1975	3–6	@ Washington Capitals (1974–75)	12–26–8
47	T	January 28, 1975	4–4	@ St. Louis Blues (1974–75)	12–26–9
48	W	January 30, 1975	5–2	Pittsburgh Penguins (1974–75)	13–26–9

February

Game	Result	Date	Score	Opponent	Record
49	L	February 1, 1975	1–4	New York Islanders (1974–75)	13–27–9
50	T	February 2, 1975	5–5	@ New York Rangers (1974–75)	13–27–10
51	L	February 4, 1975	1–6	Buffalo Sabres (1974–75)	13–28–10
52	L	February 5, 1975	5–8	@ Montreal Canadiens (1974–75)	13–29–10
53	L	February 8, 1975	5–8	Boston Bruins (1974–75)	13–30–10
54	W	February 9, 1975	5–3	Toronto Maple Leafs (1974–75)	14–30–10
55	L	February 12, 1975	2–4	@ California Golden Seals (1974–75)	14–31–10
56	L	February 14, 1975	4–5	@ Vancouver Canucks (1974–75)	14–32–10
57	L	February 15, 1975	2–8	@ Los Angeles Kings (1974–75)	14–33–10
58	W	February 19, 1975	4–3	Philadelphia Flyers (1974–75)	15–33–10
59	W	February 22, 1975	4–3	Atlanta Flames (1974–75)	16–33–10
60	W	February 23, 1975	3–1	@ Pittsburgh Penguins (1974–75)	17–33–10
61	L	February 26, 1975	1–2	Los Angeles Kings (1974–75)	17–34–10
62	L	February 27, 1975	4–9	@ Boston Bruins (1974–75)	17–35–10

March

Game	Result	Date	Score	Opponent	Record
63	W	March 1, 1975	3–2	Buffalo Sabres (1974–75)	18–35–10
64	L	March 2, 1975	4–5	Toronto Maple Leafs (1974–75)	18–36–10
65	L	March 5, 1975	3–4	@ Toronto Maple Leafs (1974–75)	18–37–10
66	W	March 8, 1975	5–1	Kansas City Scouts (1974–75)	19–37–10
67	L	March 9, 1975	5–8	@ Philadelphia Flyers (1974–75)	19–38–10
68	W	March 11, 1975	4–2	@ New York Islanders (1974–75)	20–38–10
69	T	March 13, 1975	5–5	@ Los Angeles Kings (1974–75)	20–38–11
70	L	March 14, 1975	2–4	@ California Golden Seals (1974–75)	20–39–11
71	L	March 16, 1975	3–4	@ Minnesota North Stars (1974–75)	20–40–11
72	L	March 20, 1975	2–6	Chicago Black Hawks (1974–75)	20–41–11
73	W	March 22, 1975	7–4	New York Rangers (1974–75)	21–41–11
74	T	March 23, 1975	4–4	@ Chicago Black Hawks (1974–75)	21–41–12
75	L	March 26, 1975	3–5	@ Atlanta Flames (1974–75)	21–42–12
76	L	March 29, 1975	2–4	Pittsburgh Penguins (1974–75)	21–43–12
77	W	March 30, 1975	8–5	@ Washington Capitals (1974–75)	22–43–12

April

Game	Result	Date	Score	Opponent	Record
78	W	April 2, 1975	8–3	Washington Capitals (1974–75)	23–43–12
79	L	April 5, 1975	1–7	@ Pittsburgh Penguins (1974–75)	23–44–12
80	L	April 6, 1975	2–4	Montreal Canadiens (1974–75)	23–45–12

Legend: Win (2 points) Loss (0 points) Tie (1 point)

== Player statistics ==
=== Regular season ===
Scoring

Player	Pos	GP	G	A	Pts	PIM	+/-	PPG	SHG	GWG
Marcel Dionne	C	80	47	74	121	14	−15	15	10	2
Danny Grant	RW	80	50	37	87	28	−11	19	1	5
Nick Libett	LW	80	23	28	51	39	−41	8	1	2
Bill Hogaboam	C	60	14	27	41	16	−34	6	1	1
Phil Roberto	RW	46	13	27	40	30	−10	5	0	2
Gary Bergman	D	76	5	25	30	104	−25	2	1	0
Bill Lochead	LW	65	16	12	28	34	−30	3	0	2
Mickey Redmond	RW	29	15	12	27	18	−12	5	0	1
Jean Hamel	D	80	5	19	24	136	−40	0	0	0
Hank Nowak	LW	56	8	14	22	69	−34	1	0	0
Larry Giroux	D	39	2	20	22	60	−10	1	0	1
Pierre Jarry	LW	39	8	13	21	4	−12	0	0	1
Michel Bergeron	RW	25	10	7	17	10	5	1	0	0
Walt McKechnie	C	23	6	11	17	6	−3	1	0	2
Bart Crashley	D	48	2	15	17	14	−10	0	0	0
Jack Lynch	D	50	2	15	17	46	−15	0	0	0
Bryan Watson	D	70	1	13	14	238	−29	0	1	0
Mike Bloom	LW	13	4	8	12	10	2	1	0	1
Guy Charron	C	26	1	10	11	6	−9	0	0	1
Mike Korney	RW	30	8	2	10	18	−9	2	0	1
Earl Anderson	RW	45	7	3	10	12	−11	1	0	1
Doug Roberts	RW	26	4	4	8	8	−7	4	0	0
Red Berenson	C	27	3	3	6	8	−10	1	0	0
Dave Kryskow	LW	18	1	4	5	4	−2	0	0	0
Blair Stewart	C	19	0	5	5	38	−5	0	0	0
Brian McCutcheon	LW	17	3	1	4	2	−3	0	0	0
Rick McCann	C	13	1	3	4	2	−4	0	0	0
Jim Rutherford	G	59	0	4	4	4	0	0	0	0
Ted Snell	RW	20	0	4	4	6	−10	0	0	0
Frank Bathe	D	19	0	3	3	31	−5	0	0	0
Barry Salovaara	D	27	0	2	2	18	−11	0	0	0
Thommie Bergman	D	18	0	1	1	27	−7	0	0	0
Rene Drolet	RW	1	0	0	0	0	0	0	0	0
Doug Grant	G	7	0	0	0	0	0	0	0	0
Bill McKenzie	G	13	0	0	0	2	0	0	0	0
Tom Mellor	D	1	0	0	0	0	0	0	0	0
Brian Murphy	C/LW	1	0	0	0	0	0	0	0	0
Jim Nahrgang	D	1	0	0	0	0	0	0	0	0
Dennis Polonich	C/RW	4	0	0	0	0	−1	0	0	0
Nelson Pyatt	C	9	0	0	0	2	−2	0	0	0
Terry Richardson	G	4	0	0	0	2	0	0	0	0

Goaltending

Player	MIN	GP	W	L	T	GA	GAA	SO
Jim Rutherford	3478	59	20	29	10	217	3.74	2
Doug Grant	380	7	1	5	0	34	5.37	0
Bill McKenzie	740	13	1	9	2	58	4.70	0
Terry Richardson	202	4	1	2	0	23	6.83	0
Team:	4800	80	23	45	12	332	4.15	2

Note: GP = Games played; G = Goals; A = Assists; Pts = Points; +/- = Plus-minus PIM = Penalty minutes; PPG = Power-play goals; SHG = Short-handed goals; GWG = Game-winning goals;
MIN = Minutes played; W = Wins; L = Losses; T = Ties; GA = Goals against; GAA = Goals-against average; SO = Shutouts;

== Draft picks ==
Detroit's draft picks at the 1974 NHL amateur draft held in Montreal.

Round	#	Player	Nationality	College/Junior/Club team (League)
1	9	Bill Lochead	Canada	Oshawa Generals (OMJHL)
3	44	Dan Mandryk	Canada	Calgary Centennials (WCHL)
3	45	Bill Evo	United States	Peterborough Petes (OMJHL)
4	63	Michel Bergeron	Canada	Sorel Eperviers (QMJHL)
5	81	John Taft	United States	University of Wisconsin (WCHA)
6	99	Don Dufek	United States	University of Michigan (WCHA)
7	117	Jack Carlson	United States	Marquette Iron Rangers (USHL)
8	134	Greg Steel	Canada	Calgary Centennials (WCHL)
9	151	Glen McLeod	Canada	Sudbury Wolves (OMJHL)

== See also ==
- 1974–75 NHL season
