= 1974–75 Boston Bruins season =

NHL team season

1974–75 Boston Bruins
- Division: 2nd Adams
- Conference: 4th Wales
- 1974–75 record: 40–26–14
- Home record: 29–5–6
- Road record: 11–21–8
- Goals for: 345
- Goals against: 245

Team information
- General manager: Harry Sinden
- Coach: Don Cherry
- Captain: Johnny Bucyk
- Alternate captains: Phil Esposito; Bobby Orr; Dallas Smith
- Arena: Boston Garden

Team leaders
- Goals: Phil Esposito (61)
- Assists: Bobby Orr (89)
- Points: Bobby Orr (135)
- Penalty minutes: Terry O'Reilly (146)
- Wins: Gilles Gilbert (23)
- Goals against average: Ross Brooks (2.98)

The 1974–75 Boston Bruins season was the Bruins' 51st season in the NHL.

== Regular season ==
On December 22, 1974, Phil Esposito scored the 500th goal of his career.

=== Divisional standings ===
Adams Division
		GP	W	L	T	GF	GA	DIFF	Pts
1	Buffalo Sabres	80	49	16	15	354	240	+114	113
2	Boston Bruins	80	40	26	14	345	245	+100	94
3	Toronto Maple Leafs	80	31	33	16	280	309	−29	78
4	California Golden Seals	80	19	48	13	212	316	−104	51

=== Record vs. opponents ===
Adams Division record vs. opponents

Vs. Wales Conference

Vs. Campbell Conference

Vs. Adams Division

1974–75 NHL records
Team	BOS	BUF	CAL	TOR	Total
Boston	—	1–4–1	4–2	1–2–3	6–8–4
Buffalo	4–1–1	—	4–0–2	4–1–1	12–2–4
California	2–4	0–4–2	—	1–3–2	3–11–4
Toronto	2–1–3	1–4–1	3–1–2	—	6–6–6

Vs. Norris Division

1974–75 NHL records
Team	DET	LAK	MTL	PIT	WSH	Total
Boston	4–1	2–3	0–3–2	2–1–2	4–0–1	12–8–5
Buffalo	3–1–1	1–3–1	4–0–1	3–0–2	5–0	16–4–5
California	2–2–1	1–2–2	0–5	0–4–1	3–2	6–15–4
Toronto	3–1–1	0–4–1	2–1–2	1–4	4–1	10–11–4

Vs. Patrick Division

1974–75 NHL records
Team	ATL	NYI	NYR	PHI	Total
Boston	4–0–1	2–2	3–1	2–1–1	11–4–2
Buffalo	1–2–1	2–0–2	4–1	0–3–1	7–6–4
California	2–2	1–2–1	0–2–2	2–3	5–9–3
Toronto	1–3	2–2–1	2–1–1	0–3–1	5–9–3

Vs. Smythe Division

1974–75 NHL records
Team	CHI	KCS	MIN	STL	VAN	Total
Boston	2–2	2–1–1	3–0–1	1–2–1	3–1	11–6–3
Buffalo	3–1	4–0	3–1	2–0–2	2–2	14–4–2
California	1–3	1–2–1	1–3	2–1–1	0–4	5–13–2
Toronto	2–2	2–1–1	3–1	2–0–2	1–3	10–7–3

== Schedule and results ==
=== Regular season ===
1974–75 regular season
October

Game	Result	Date	Score	Opponent	Record
1	L	October 10, 1974	5–9	@ Buffalo Sabres (1974–75)	0–1–0
2	T	October 13, 1974	2–2	Toronto Maple Leafs (1974–75)	0–1–1
3	L	October 16, 1974	0–4	@ Chicago Black Hawks (1974–75)	0–2–1
4	W	October 17, 1974	4–1	@ Philadelphia Flyers (1974–75)	1–2–1
5	W	October 20, 1974	5–0	California Golden Seals (1974–75)	2–2–1
6	T	October 23, 1974	5–5	@ Pittsburgh Penguins (1974–75)	2–2–2
7	T	October 24, 1974	4–4	St. Louis Blues (1974–75)	2–2–3
8	W	October 27, 1974	8–2	Kansas City Scouts (1974–75)	3–2–3
9	T	October 30, 1974	3–3	@ Minnesota North Stars (1974–75)	3–2–4

November

Game	Result	Date	Score	Opponent	Record
10	L	November 2, 1974	2–3	@ New York Islanders (1974–75)	3–3–4
11	W	November 3, 1974	10–1	Minnesota North Stars (1974–75)	4–3–4
12	T	November 5, 1974	2–2	Buffalo Sabres (1974–75)	4–3–5
13	W	November 7, 1974	10–4	Washington Capitals (1974–75)	5–3–5
14	W	November 10, 1974	4–3	Atlanta Flames (1974–75)	6–3–5
15	L	November 12, 1974	3–4	@ St. Louis Blues (1974–75)	6–4–5
16	L	November 14, 1974	1–4	Montreal Canadiens (1974–75)	6–5–5
17	W	November 16, 1974	7–5	Buffalo Sabres (1974–75)	7–5–5
18	W	November 17, 1974	5–2	@ Detroit Red Wings (1974–75)	8–5–5
19	W	November 21, 1974	4–2	California Golden Seals (1974–75)	9–5–5
20	W	November 23, 1974	5–2	@ New York Rangers (1974–75)	10–5–5
21	W	November 24, 1974	7–4	Vancouver Canucks (1974–75)	11–5–5
22	W	November 27, 1974	3–1	@ California Golden Seals (1974–75)	12–5–5
23	L	November 30, 1974	0–2	@ Los Angeles Kings (1974–75)	12–6–5

December

Game	Result	Date	Score	Opponent	Record
24	T	December 4, 1974	4–4	@ Montreal Canadiens (1974–75)	12–6–6
25	L	December 5, 1974	4–6	Detroit Red Wings (1974–75)	12–7–6
26	W	December 8, 1974	3–2	Pittsburgh Penguins (1974–75)	13–7–6
27	W	December 10, 1974	6–2	@ Kansas City Scouts (1974–75)	14–7–6
28	W	December 12, 1974	8–1	Los Angeles Kings (1974–75)	15–7–6
29	W	December 14, 1974	12–1	Washington Capitals (1974–75)	16–7–6
30	W	December 15, 1974	5–2	New York Islanders (1974–75)	17–7–6
31	W	December 17, 1974	5–3	Atlanta Flames (1974–75)	18–7–6
32	W	December 19, 1974	11–3	New York Rangers (1974–75)	19–7–6
33	L	December 21, 1974	4–8	@ Toronto Maple Leafs (1974–75)	19–8–6
34	W	December 22, 1974	5–4	Detroit Red Wings (1974–75)	20–8–6
35	L	December 27, 1974	2–5	@ California Golden Seals (1974–75)	20–9–6
36	L	December 28, 1974	4–6	@ Vancouver Canucks (1974–75)	20–10–6

January

Game	Result	Date	Score	Opponent	Record
37	W	January 2, 1975	5–2	@ Los Angeles Kings (1974–75)	21–10–6
38	W	January 4, 1975	8–0	@ Minnesota North Stars (1974–75)	22–10–6
39	T	January 7, 1975	3–3	@ Washington Capitals (1974–75)	22–10–7
40	W	January 9, 1975	5–1	Vancouver Canucks (1974–75)	23–10–7
41	W	January 11, 1975	5–1	Chicago Black Hawks (1974–75)	24–10–7
42	L	January 15, 1975	3–5	@ Montreal Canadiens (1974–75)	24–11–7
43	L	January 16, 1975	1–4	Los Angeles Kings (1974–75)	24–12–7
44	T	January 18, 1975	4–4	@ Pittsburgh Penguins (1974–75)	24–12–8
45	W	January 19, 1975	6–3	Toronto Maple Leafs (1974–75)	25–12–8
46	L	January 23, 1975	2–3	Kansas City Scouts (1974–75)	25–13–8
47	T	January 26, 1975	2–2	Philadelphia Flyers (1974–75)	25–13–9
48	T	January 27, 1975	3–3	@ Kansas City Scouts (1974–75)	25–13–10
49	W	January 30, 1975	6–0	California Golden Seals (1974–75)	26–13–10

February

Game	Result	Date	Score	Opponent	Record
50	L	February 1, 1975	2–3	@ Toronto Maple Leafs (1974–75)	26–14–10
51	W	February 2, 1975	5–1	Philadelphia Flyers (1974–75)	27–14–10
52	T	February 5, 1975	3–3	@ Atlanta Flames (1974–75)	27–14–11
53	W	February 6, 1975	3–2	Minnesota North Stars (1974–75)	28–14–11
54	W	February 8, 1975	8–5	@ Detroit Red Wings (1974–75)	29–14–11
55	W	February 9, 1975	5–1	New York Islanders (1974–75)	30–14–11
56	L	February 12, 1975	3–8	@ Chicago Black Hawks (1974–75)	30–15–11
57	L	February 13, 1975	1–3	@ Buffalo Sabres (1974–75)	30–16–11
58	L	February 16, 1975	3–4	@ Philadelphia Flyers (1974–75)	30–17–11
59	W	February 18, 1975	3–1	@ Vancouver Canucks (1974–75)	31–17–11
60	L	February 21, 1975	4–6	@ California Golden Seals (1974–75)	31–18–11
61	L	February 22, 1975	0–6	@ Los Angeles Kings (1974–75)	31–19–11
62	W	February 25, 1975	6–4	Pittsburgh Penguins (1974–75)	32–19–11
63	W	February 27, 1975	9–4	Detroit Red Wings (1974–75)	33–19–11

March

Game	Result	Date	Score	Opponent	Record
64	W	March 2, 1975	6–2	Chicago Black Hawks (1974–75)	34–19–11
65	W	March 4, 1975	8–0	@ Washington Capitals (1974–75)	35–19–11
66	W	March 7, 1975	4–2	@ Atlanta Flames (1974–75)	36–19–11
67	W	March 9, 1975	5–2	Atlanta Flames (1974–75)	37–19–11
68	W	March 11, 1975	6–3	New York Rangers (1974–75)	38–19–11
69	L	March 12, 1975	3–5	@ Pittsburgh Penguins (1974–75)	38–20–11
70	L	March 15, 1975	1–3	@ New York Islanders (1974–75)	38–21–11
71	W	March 16, 1975	7–2	St. Louis Blues (1974–75)	39–21–11
72	L	March 19, 1975	1–2	@ Montreal Canadiens (1974–75)	39–22–11
73	W	March 22, 1975	8–2	Washington Capitals (1974–75)	40–22–11
74	L	March 23, 1975	5–7	@ New York Rangers (1974–75)	40–23–11
75	L	March 26, 1975	1–3	@ St. Louis Blues (1974–75)	40–24–11
76	T	March 29, 1975	1–1	@ Toronto Maple Leafs (1974–75)	40–24–12
77	T	March 30, 1975	2–2	Montreal Canadiens (1974–75)	40–24–13

April

Game	Result	Date	Score	Opponent	Record
78	L	April 1, 1975	1–3	Buffalo Sabres (1974–75)	40–25–13
79	L	April 3, 1975	2–4	@ Buffalo Sabres (1974–75)	40–26–13
80	T	April 6, 1975	4–4	Toronto Maple Leafs (1974–75)	40–26–14

Legend: Win (2 points) Loss (0 points) Tie (1 point)

=== Playoffs ===
April 8	Chicago Blackhawks	2–8	Boston Bruins	Boston Garden	Recap
No scoring		First period	08:38 – Johnny Bucyk (1); 15:03 – Carol Vadnais (1); 15:12 – Andre Savard (1)
No scoring		Second period	10:39 – Phil Esposito (1); 16:01 – Gregg Sheppard (1); 16:50 – Gregg Sheppard (2)
Dick Redmond (1) – pp – 04:20; John Marks (1) – 19:59		Third period	01:29 – pp – Phil Esposito (2); 11:03 – Phil Esposito (3)
Tony Esposito, Michel Dumas		Goalie stats	Gilles Gilbert

April 10	Boston Bruins	3–4	OT	Chicago Blackhawks	Chicago Stadium	Recap
No scoring		First period		03:15 – Ivan Boldirev (1); 14:37 – pp – Stan Mikita (1)
Don Marcotte (1) – 04:35; Ken Hodge (1) – pp – 13:32		Second period		15:39 – Dale Tallon (1)
Bobby Orr (1) – sh – 01:31		Third period		No scoring
No scoring		First overtime period		07:33 – Ivan Boldirev (2)
Gilles Gilbert		Goalie stats		Tony Esposito

April 11	Chicago Blackhawks	6–4	Boston Bruins	Boston Garden	Recap
Keith Magnuson (1) – 01:26; Cliff Koroll (1) – pp – 19:13		First period	No scoring
J.P. Bordeleau (1) – 02:27; Cliff Koroll (2) – pp – 15:34; John Marks (2) – 18:24		Second period	07:16 – Bobby Schmautz (1); 09:32 – Hank Nowak (1); 18:58 – Gregg Sheppard (3)
J.P. Bordeleau (2) – 11:27		Third period	15:55 – Phil Esposito (4)
Tony Esposito		Goalie stats	Gilles Gilbert

Chicago won series 2–1

== Player statistics ==
=== Regular season ===
Scoring

= Indicates league leader

Player	Pos	GP	G	A	Pts	PIM	+/-	PPG	SHG	GWG
Bobby Orr	D	80	46	89	135	101	80	16	2	4
Phil Esposito	C	79	61	66	127	62	18	27	4	8
John Bucyk	LW	78	29	52	81	10	11	9	0	4
Gregg Sheppard	C	76	30	48	78	19	43	5	7	4
Carol Vadnais	D	79	18	56	74	129	10	6	0	2
Ken Hodge	RW	72	23	43	66	90	7	16	0	2
Don Marcotte	LW	80	31	33	64	76	24	1	0	2
Bobby Schmautz	RW	56	21	30	51	63	23	1	0	2
Andre Savard	C	77	19	25	44	45	16	0	0	2
Terry O'Reilly	RW	68	15	20	35	146	15	2	0	2
Wayne Cashman	LW	42	11	22	33	24	7	2	0	3
Dave Forbes	LW	69	18	12	30	80	22	0	0	2
Dallas Smith	D	79	3	20	23	84	30	0	0	1
Al Sims	D	75	4	8	12	73	29	0	0	0
Hank Nowak	LW	21	4	7	11	26	8	0	0	1
Darryl Edestrand	D	68	1	9	10	56	8	0	0	0
Walt McKechnie	C	53	3	3	6	8	−6	0	1	0
Earl Anderson	RW	19	2	4	6	4	5	0	0	1
Dave Hynes	LW	19	4	0	4	2	3	0	0	0
Rod Graham	LW	14	2	1	3	7	0	1	0	0
Gilles Gilbert	G	53	0	1	1	10	0	0	0	0
Steve Langdon	LW	1	0	1	1	0	1	0	0	0
Ken Broderick	G	15	0	0	0	2	0	0	0	0
Ross Brooks	G	17	0	0	0	0	0	0	0	0
Gordie Clark	RW	1	0	0	0	0	0	0	0	0
Gary Doak	D	40	0	0	0	30	−3	0	0	0
Jake Rathwell	RW	1	0	0	0	0	0	0	0	0
Craig Sarner	RW	7	0	0	0	0	−3	0	0	0

Goaltending

Player	MIN	GP	W	L	T	GA	GAA	SO
Gilles Gilbert	3029	53	23	17	11	158	3.13	3
Ross Brooks	967	17	10	3	3	48	2.98	0
Ken Broderick	804	15	7	6	0	32	2.39	1
Team:	4800	80	40	26	14	238	2.97	4

=== Playoffs ===
Scoring

Player	Pos	GP	G	A	Pts	PIM	PPG	SHG	GWG
Bobby Orr	D	3	1	5	6	2	0	1	0
Bobby Schmautz	RW	3	1	5	6	6	0	0	0
Carol Vadnais	D	3	1	5	6	0	0	0	0
Phil Esposito	C	3	4	1	5	0	1	0	0
Gregg Sheppard	C	3	3	1	4	5	0	0	0
Ken Hodge	RW	3	1	1	2	0	1	0	0
Andre Savard	C	3	1	1	2	2	0	0	1
Wayne Cashman	LW	1	0	2	2	0	0	0	0
Dallas Smith	D	3	0	2	2	4	0	0	0
John Bucyk	LW	3	1	0	1	0	0	0	0
Don Marcotte	LW	3	1	0	1	0	0	0	0
Hank Nowak	LW	3	1	0	1	0	0	0	0
Earl Anderson	RW	3	0	1	1	0	0	0	0
Darryl Edestrand	D	3	0	1	1	7	0	0	0
Gary Doak	D	3	0	0	0	4	0	0	0
Dave Forbes	LW	3	0	0	0	0	0	0	0
Gilles Gilbert	G	3	0	0	0	0	0	0	0
Terry O'Reilly	RW	3	0	0	0	17	0	0	0

Goaltending

Player	MIN	GP	W	L	GA	GAA	SO
Gilles Gilbert	188	3	1	2	12	3.83	0
Team:	188	3	1	2	12	3.83	0

Note:

Pos = Position;GP = Games played; G = Goals; A = Assists; Pts = Points; PIM = Penalty minutes; +/- = Plus/minus; PPG = Power-play goals; SHG = Short-handed goals; GWG = Game-winning goals
Pos = Position;GP = Games played; Min, TOI = Minutes played; W = Wins; L = Losses; T,T/OT = Ties; OTL = Overtime losses; GA = Goals-against; GAA = Goals-against average; SO = Shutouts; SA = Shots against; SV = Shots saved;SV% = Save percentage;

== Draft picks ==
Round	#	Player	Position	Nationality	College/Junior/Club team (League)
1	18	Don Larway	Right wing	Canada	Swift Current Broncos (WCHL)
2	25	Mark Howe	Left wing	United States	Houston Aeros (WHA)
2	36	Peter Sturgeon	Left wing	Canada	Kitchener Rangers (OMJHL)
3	54	Tom Edur	Defense	Canada	Cleveland Crusaders (WHA)
4	72	Bill Reed	Defense	Canada	Sault Ste. Marie Greyhounds (OMJHL)
5	90	Jamie Bateman	Left wing	Canada	Quebec Remparts (QMJHL)
6	108	Bill Best	Left wing	Canada	Sudbury Wolves (OMJHL)
7	126	Ray Maluta	Defense	Canada	Flin Flon Bombers (WCHL)
8	143	Daryl Drader	Defense	Canada	University of North Dakota (WCHA)
9	160	Pete Roberts	Center	United States	St. Cloud Junior Blues (MWJHL)
10	175	Peter Waselovich	Goaltender	United States	University of North Dakota (WCHA)

== See also ==
- 1974–75 NHL season
