= 1974–75 Toronto Maple Leafs season =

58th season of the Toronto Maple Leafs

1974–75 Toronto Maple Leafs
- Division: 3rd Adams
- Conference: 6th Wales
- 1974–75 record: 31–33–16
- Home record: 19–12–9
- Road record: 12–21–7
- Goals for: 280
- Goals against: 309

Team information
- General manager: Jim Gregory
- Coach: Red Kelly
- Captain: Dave Keon
- Arena: Maple Leaf Gardens

Team leaders
- Goals: Darryl Sittler (36)
- Assists: Darryl Sittler (44)
- Points: Darryl Sittler (80)
- Penalty minutes: Tiger Williams (187)
- Wins: Doug Favell (12)
- Goals against average: Gord McRae (3.22)

The 1974–75 Toronto Maple Leafs season was the 58th season of the franchise, 48th season as the Maple Leafs. The team made the playoffs for the second consecutive year, but were swept by the Philadelphia Flyers, the eventual Stanley Cup champions, in four games in the quarterfinals.

== Offseason ==
=== NHL draft ===
Round	Pick	Player	Position	Nationality	Club Team
1	13	Jack Valiquette	Forward	Canada	Sault Ste. Marie Greyhounds (OMJHL)
2	31	Tiger Williams	Left wing	Canada	Swift Current Broncos (WCHL)
3	49	Per-Arne Alexandersson	Centre	Sweden	Leksands IF (Sweden)
4	67	Peter Driscoll	Left wing	Canada	Kingston Canadians (OMJHL)
5	85	Mike Palmateer	Goaltender	Canada	Toronto Marlboros (OMJHL)
6	103	Bill Hassard	Centre	Canada	Wexford Warriors (MetJHL)
7	121	Kevin Devine	Left wing	Canada	Toronto Marlboros (OMJHL)
8	138	Kevin Kemp	Defence	Canada	Ottawa 67's (OMJHL)
9	155	Dave Syvret	Defence	Canada	St. Catharines Black Hawks (OMJHL)
10	170	Andy Stoesz	Goaltender	Canada	Selkirk Steelers (MJHL)
11	185	Marty Feschuk	Defence	Canada	Saskatoon Blades (WCHL)

== Regular season ==
=== Season standings ===
Adams Division
		GP	W	L	T	GF	GA	DIFF	Pts
1	Buffalo Sabres	80	49	16	15	354	240	+114	113
2	Boston Bruins	80	40	26	14	345	245	+100	94
3	Toronto Maple Leafs	80	31	33	16	280	309	−29	78
4	California Golden Seals	80	19	48	13	212	316	−104	51

=== Record vs. opponents ===
Adams Division record vs. opponents

Vs. Wales Conference

Vs. Campbell Conference

Vs. Adams Division

1974–75 NHL records
Team	BOS	BUF	CAL	TOR	Total
Boston	—	1–4–1	4–2	1–2–3	6–8–4
Buffalo	4–1–1	—	4–0–2	4–1–1	12–2–4
California	2–4	0–4–2	—	1–3–2	3–11–4
Toronto	2–1–3	1–4–1	3–1–2	—	6–6–6

Vs. Norris Division

1974–75 NHL records
Team	DET	LAK	MTL	PIT	WSH	Total
Boston	4–1	2–3	0–3–2	2–1–2	4–0–1	12–8–5
Buffalo	3–1–1	1–3–1	4–0–1	3–0–2	5–0	16–4–5
California	2–2–1	1–2–2	0–5	0–4–1	3–2	6–15–4
Toronto	3–1–1	0–4–1	2–1–2	1–4	4–1	10–11–4

Vs. Patrick Division

1974–75 NHL records
Team	ATL	NYI	NYR	PHI	Total
Boston	4–0–1	2–2	3–1	2–1–1	11–4–2
Buffalo	1–2–1	2–0–2	4–1	0–3–1	7–6–4
California	2–2	1–2–1	0–2–2	2–3	5–9–3
Toronto	1–3	2–2–1	2–1–1	0–3–1	5–9–3

Vs. Smythe Division

1974–75 NHL records
Team	CHI	KCS	MIN	STL	VAN	Total
Boston	2–2	2–1–1	3–0–1	1–2–1	3–1	11–6–3
Buffalo	3–1	4–0	3–1	2–0–2	2–2	14–4–2
California	1–3	1–2–1	1–3	2–1–1	0–4	5–13–2
Toronto	2–2	2–1–1	3–1	2–0–2	1–3	10–7–3

== Schedule and results ==
1974–75 regular season
October

Game	Result	Date	Score	Opponent	Record
1	W	October 9, 1974	6–2	Kansas City Scouts (1974–75)	1–0–0
2	W	October 12, 1974	7–3	New York Rangers (1974–75)	2–0–0
3	T	October 13, 1974	2–2	@ Boston Bruins (1974–75)	2–0–1
4	T	October 16, 1974	1–1	Los Angeles Kings (1974–75)	2–0–2
5	L	October 19, 1974	4–5	Vancouver Canucks (1974–75)	2–1–2
6	T	October 20, 1974	5–5	@ Buffalo Sabres (1974–75)	2–1–3
7	L	October 23, 1974	2–3	Montreal Canadiens (1974–75)	2–2–3
8	L	October 26, 1974	3–9	Chicago Black Hawks (1974–75)	2–3–3
9	W	October 27, 1974	4–3	@ Washington Capitals (1974–75)	3–3–3

November

Game	Result	Date	Score	Opponent	Record
10	L	November 1, 1974	2–5	@ Atlanta Flames (1974–75)	3–4–3
11	L	November 2, 1974	3–6	Buffalo Sabres (1974–75)	3–5–3
12	W	November 6, 1974	7–4	Minnesota North Stars (1974–75)	4–5–3
13	L	November 9, 1974	5–7	@ Minnesota North Stars (1974–75)	4–6–3
14	L	November 13, 1974	0–4	@ Los Angeles Kings (1974–75)	4–7–3
15	W	November 15, 1974	5–3	@ California Golden Seals (1974–75)	5–7–3
16	L	November 16, 1974	2–5	@ Vancouver Canucks (1974–75)	5–8–3
17	L	November 20, 1974	5–8	Pittsburgh Penguins (1974–75)	5–9–3
18	L	November 22, 1974	0–6	@ New York Islanders (1974–75)	5–10–3
19	L	November 23, 1974	3–6	Philadelphia Flyers (1974–75)	5–11–3
20	T	November 25, 1974	2–2	St. Louis Blues (1974–75)	5–11–4
21	L	November 27, 1974	1–4	@ New York Rangers (1974–75)	5–12–4
22	W	November 30, 1974	7–1	Washington Capitals (1974–75)	6–12–4

December

Game	Result	Date	Score	Opponent	Record
23	L	December 4, 1974	2–4	@ Pittsburgh Penguins (1974–75)	6–13–4
24	T	December 5, 1974	3–3	@ New York Islanders (1974–75)	6–13–5
25	T	December 7, 1974	3–3	Detroit Red Wings (1974–75)	6–13–6
26	W	December 8, 1974	4–1	@ Chicago Black Hawks (1974–75)	7–13–6
27	L	December 11, 1974	1–4	Los Angeles Kings (1974–75)	7–14–6
28	W	December 14, 1974	4–2	Atlanta Flames (1974–75)	8–14–6
29	L	December 15, 1974	1–3	@ Washington Capitals (1974–75)	8–15–6
30	W	December 18, 1974	6–4	Pittsburgh Penguins (1974–75)	9–15–6
31	L	December 19, 1974	1–5	@ Philadelphia Flyers (1974–75)	9–16–6
32	W	December 21, 1974	8–4	Boston Bruins (1974–75)	10–16–6
33	L	December 22, 1974	0–3	@ Chicago Black Hawks (1974–75)	10–17–6
34	W	December 28, 1974	3–1	New York Islanders (1974–75)	11–17–6
35	L	December 30, 1974	5–7	@ Pittsburgh Penguins (1974–75)	11–18–6

January

Game	Result	Date	Score	Opponent	Record
36	T	January 1, 1975	3–3	California Golden Seals (1974–75)	11–18–7
37	W	January 4, 1975	6–3	Chicago Black Hawks (1974–75)	12–18–7
38	W	January 5, 1975	1–0	@ Detroit Red Wings (1974–75)	13–18–7
39	L	January 7, 1975	3–5	@ New York Islanders (1974–75)	13–19–7
40	W	January 8, 1975	6–4	Vancouver Canucks (1974–75)	14–19–7
41	L	January 11, 1975	5–7	Los Angeles Kings (1974–75)	14–20–7
42	W	January 12, 1975	4–3	New York Islanders (1974–75)	15–20–7
43	W	January 15, 1975	4–1	@ St. Louis Blues (1974–75)	16–20–7
44	W	January 18, 1975	5–3	@ Montreal Canadiens (1974–75)	17–20–7
45	L	January 19, 1975	3–6	@ Boston Bruins (1974–75)	17–21–7
46	L	January 23, 1975	0–8	@ Los Angeles Kings (1974–75)	17–22–7
47	L	January 24, 1975	1–6	@ California Golden Seals (1974–75)	17–23–7
48	L	January 26, 1975	4–6	@ Vancouver Canucks (1974–75)	17–24–7
49	W	January 29, 1975	4–2	California Golden Seals (1974–75)	18–24–7
50	L	January 30, 1975	1–3	@ Philadelphia Flyers (1974–75)	18–25–7

February

Game	Result	Date	Score	Opponent	Record
51	W	February 1, 1975	3–2	Boston Bruins (1974–75)	19–25–7
52	W	February 4, 1975	5–3	@ St. Louis Blues (1974–75)	20–25–7
53	L	February 6, 1975	2–3	@ Kansas City Scouts (1974–75)	20–26–7
54	T	February 8, 1975	3–3	St. Louis Blues (1974–75)	20–26–8
55	L	February 9, 1975	3–5	@ Detroit Red Wings (1974–75)	20–27–8
56	T	February 12, 1975	2–2	Montreal Canadiens (1974–75)	20–27–9
57	L	February 15, 1975	3–8	Pittsburgh Penguins (1974–75)	20–28–9
58	T	February 16, 1975	5–5	@ New York Rangers (1974–75)	20–28–10
59	T	February 19, 1975	3–3	@ California Golden Seals (1974–75)	20–28–11
60	W	February 22, 1975	5–2	New York Rangers (1974–75)	21–28–11
61	L	February 23, 1975	1–4	@ Buffalo Sabres (1974–75)	21–29–11
62	W	February 25, 1975	9–2	@ Minnesota North Stars (1974–75)	22–29–11
63	W	February 26, 1975	4–2	Kansas City Scouts (1974–75)	23–29–11

March

Game	Result	Date	Score	Opponent	Record
64	W	March 1, 1975	5–4	Washington Capitals (1974–75)	24–29–11
65	W	March 2, 1975	5–4	@ Detroit Red Wings (1974–75)	25–29–11
66	W	March 5, 1975	4–3	Detroit Red Wings (1974–75)	26–29–11
67	W	March 8, 1975	5–3	Minnesota North Stars (1974–75)	27–29–11
68	W	March 9, 1975	4–2	@ Washington Capitals (1974–75)	28–29–11
69	T	March 12, 1975	3–3	Montreal Canadiens (1974–75)	28–29–12
70	T	March 15, 1975	4–4	Philadelphia Flyers (1974–75)	28–29–13
71	L	March 16, 1975	3–11	Buffalo Sabres (1974–75)	28–30–13
72	L	March 19, 1975	7–8	@ Atlanta Flames (1974–75)	28–31–13
73	W	March 22, 1975	6–4	@ Montreal Canadiens (1974–75)	29–31–13
74	W	March 24, 1975	5–3	California Golden Seals (1974–75)	30–31–13
75	T	March 26, 1975	2–2	@ Kansas City Scouts (1974–75)	30–31–14
76	T	March 29, 1975	1–1	Boston Bruins (1974–75)	30–31–15
77	W	March 30, 1975	5–4	@ Buffalo Sabres (1974–75)	31–31–15

April

Game	Result	Date	Score	Opponent	Record
78	L	April 2, 1975	0–3	Atlanta Flames (1974–75)	31–32–15
79	L	April 5, 1975	2–4	Buffalo Sabres (1974–75)	31–33–15
80	T	April 6, 1975	4–4	@ Boston Bruins (1974–75)	31–33–16

Legend: Win (2 points) Loss (0 points) Tie (1 point)

== Player statistics ==
=== Regular season ===
Scoring

Player	Pos	GP	G	A	Pts	PIM	+/-	PPG	SHG	GWG
Darryl Sittler	C	72	36	44	80	47	−10	12	1	2
Ron Ellis	RW	79	32	29	61	25	9	11	0	5
Dave Keon	C	78	16	43	59	4	3	1	1	2
George Ferguson	C	69	19	30	49	61	5	3	1	5
Lanny McDonald	RW	64	17	27	44	86	5	2	1	1
Jim McKenny	D	66	8	35	43	31	−4	0	1	1
Errol Thompson	LW	65	25	17	42	12	−1	3	1	4
Inge Hammarstrom	LW	69	21	20	41	23	−14	3	0	2
Bill Flett	RW	77	15	25	40	38	0	4	3	2
Blaine Stoughton	RW	78	23	14	37	24	−7	4	0	1
Borje Salming	D	60	12	25	37	34	4	4	1	1
Norm Ullman	C	80	9	26	35	8	−12	1	0	0
Tiger Williams	LW	42	10	19	29	187	4	2	0	0
Gary Sabourin	RW	55	5	18	23	26	−13	1	0	0
Bob Neely	LW	57	5	16	21	61	−18	2	0	1
Claire Alexander	D	42	7	11	18	12	11	4	0	1
Rod Seiling	D	60	5	12	17	40	8	1	1	1
Dave Dunn	D	72	3	11	14	142	−10	0	0	2
Ian Turnbull	D	22	6	7	13	44	−6	1	0	0
Lyle Moffat	LW	22	2	7	9	13	−2	0	0	0
Brian Glennie	D	63	1	7	8	110	−5	0	0	0
Eddie Shack	LW	26	2	1	3	11	−8	1	0	0
Tim Ecclestone	LW	5	1	1	2	0	1	0	0	0
Doug Favell	G	39	0	1	1	10	0	0	0	0
Willie Brossart	D	4	0	0	0	2	0	0	0	0
John Grisdale	D	2	0	0	0	4	0	0	0	0
Pierre Hamel	G	4	0	0	0	2	0	0	0	0
Gord McRae	G	20	0	0	0	4	0	0	0	0
Garry Monahan	LW	1	0	0	0	0	0	0	0	0
Bob Sykes	LW	2	0	0	0	0	−2	0	0	0
Jack Valiquette	C	1	0	0	0	0	−4	0	0	0
Dunc Wilson	G	25	0	0	0	6	0	0	0	0

Goaltending

Player	MIN	GP	W	L	T	GA	GAA	SO
Doug Favell	2149	39	12	17	6	145	4.05	1
Gord McRae	1063	20	10	3	6	57	3.22	0
Dunc Wilson	1393	25	8	11	4	86	3.70	0
Pierre Hamel	195	4	1	2	0	18	5.54	0
Team:	4800	80	31	33	16	306	3.83	1

=== Playoffs ===
Scoring

Player	Pos	GP	G	A	Pts	PIM	PPG	SHG	GWG
Blaine Stoughton	RW	7	4	2	6	2	1	0	1
Dave Keon	C	7	0	5	5	0	0	0	0
Inge Hammarstrom	LW	7	1	3	4	4	0	0	1
Tiger Williams	LW	7	1	3	4	25	1	0	0
Borje Salming	D	7	0	4	4	6	0	0	0
Ron Ellis	RW	7	3	0	3	2	1	0	0
Darryl Sittler	C	7	2	1	3	15	1	0	0
Dave Dunn	D	7	1	1	2	24	0	0	0
Ian Turnbull	D	7	0	2	2	4	0	0	0
George Ferguson	C	7	1	0	1	7	0	0	0
Jim McKenny	D	7	0	1	1	2	0	0	0
Claire Alexander	D	7	0	0	0	0	0	0	0
Bill Flett	RW	5	0	0	0	2	0	0	0
Lanny McDonald	RW	7	0	0	0	2	0	0	0
Gord McRae	G	7	0	0	0	0	0	0	0
Bob Neely	LW	3	0	0	0	2	0	0	0
Rod Seiling	D	7	0	0	0	0	0	0	0
Errol Thompson	LW	6	0	0	0	9	0	0	0
Norm Ullman	C	7	0	0	0	2	0	0	0

Goaltending

Player	MIN	GP	W	L	GA	GAA	SO
Gord McRae	441	7	2	5	21	2.86	0
Team:	441	7	2	5	21	2.86	0

Note:

Pos = Position;GP = Games played; G = Goals; A = Assists; Pts = Points; PIM = Penalty minutes; +/- = Plus/minus; PPG = Power-play goals; SHG = Short-handed goals; GWG = Game-winning goals
Pos = Position;GP = Games played; Min, TOI = Minutes played; W = Wins; L = Losses; T,T/OT = Ties; OTL = Overtime losses; GA = Goals-against; GAA = Goals-against average; SO = Shutouts; SA = Shots against; SV = Shots saved;SV% = Save percentage;

== Transactions ==
The Maple Leafs have been involved in the following transactions during the 1974–75 season.

=== Trades ===
September 13, 1974	To Pittsburgh Penguins Rick Kehoe	To Toronto Maple Leafs Blaine Stoughton; 1st round pick in 1977 – Trevor Johansen
October 16, 1974	To Vancouver Canucks John Grisdale; Garry Monahan	To Toronto Maple Leafs Dave Dunn
November 2, 1974	To Washington Capitals Willie Brossart; Tim Ecclestone	To Toronto Maple Leafs Rod Seiling
February 1, 1975	To Minnesota Fighting Saints (WHA) Bill Butters	To Toronto Maple Leafs Cash
June 3, 1975	To Boston Bruins 4th round pick in 1975 – Rick Adduono	To Toronto Maple Leafs 3rd round pick in 1976 – Gary McFadyen
June 3, 1975	To Chicago Black Hawks Cash	To Toronto Maple Leafs 10th round pick in 1975 – Paul Crowley; 11th round pick in 1975 – Jack Laine
June 3, 1975	To Washington Capitals Cash	To Toronto Maple Leafs 12th round pick in 1975 – Ken Holland
June 3, 1975	To Kansas City Scouts Cash	To Toronto Maple Leafs 12th round pick in 1975 – Bob Barnes
June 3, 1975	To St. Louis Blues Cash	To Toronto Maple Leafs 12th round pick in 1975 – Jim Montgomery

=== Waivers ===
February 16, 1975	To New York Rangers Dunc Wilson
May 20, 1975	To Atlanta Flames Bill Flett

=== Expansion draft ===
June 12, 1974	To Washington Capitals Denis Dupere
June 12, 1974	To Washington Capitals Joe Lundrigan
June 12, 1974	To Washington Capitals Ron Low

=== Free agents ===
Player	Former team
Claire Alexander	Tulsa Oilers (CHL)
Pierre Hamel	Undrafted Free Agent
