= 1974–75 California Golden Seals season =

NHL season

1974–75 California Golden Seals
- Division: 4th Adams
- Conference: 8th Wales
- 1974–75 record: 19–48–13
- Home record: 15–15–10
- Road record: 4–33–3
- Goals for: 212
- Goals against: 316

Team information
- General manager: Bill McCreary
- Coach: Marshall Johnston; Bill McCreary
- Captain: Joey Johnston
- Alternate captains: Len Frig; Jim Neilson; Bob Stewart
- Arena: Oakland Coliseum Arena

Team leaders
- Goals: Dave Hrechkosy (29)
- Assists: Stan Weir (27)
- Points: Larry Patey, Stan Weir (45)
- Penalty minutes: Len Frig (127)
- Plus/minus: Frank Spring (+1)
- Wins: Gary Simmons (10)
- Goals against average: Gary Simmons (3.67)

The 1974–75 California Golden Seals season was the Seals' 8th season in the NHL. The team continued to be operated by the league until early 1975, when new local ownership led by Mel Swig, owner of the Fairmont Hotel in San Francisco, was found. The Seals adopted new uniforms this season with new turquoise and gold colors. They recorded a 15-point improvement over the previous season. In early 1975, rumors began to circulate that the Seals would be relocated to Denver, Colorado, although this did not come to pass.

On March 28, 1975, the Seals suffered the indignity of losing at home to the expansion Washington Capitals, 5–3, providing the Caps with the only road win of their inaugural season.

== Offseason ==
=== Amateur Draft ===
Round	Pick	Player	Nationality	College/Junior/Club team
1	3.	Rick Hampton	Canada	St. Catharines Black Hawks (OHA)
1	17.	Ron Chipperfield	Canada	Brandon Wheat Kings (WCHL)
2	21.	Bruce Affleck	Canada	University of Denver Pioneers (WCHA)
3	39.	Charlie Simmer	Canada	Sault Ste. Marie Greyhounds (OHA)
4	57.	Tom Price	Canada	Ottawa 67's (OHA)
5	75.	Jim Warden	United States	Michigan Tech Huskies (WCHA)
6	93.	Tom Sundberg	United States	St. Paul Vulcans (MidJHL)
7	111.	Tom Anderson	United States	St. Paul Vulcans (MidJHL)
8	128.	Jim McCabe	Canada	Welland Sabres (SOJHL)

== Regular season ==
On March 28, 1975, the Seals lost at home 5–3 to Washington, giving the expansion Capitals their only road win of the season.

=== Final standings ===
Adams Division
		GP	W	L	T	GF	GA	DIFF	Pts
1	Buffalo Sabres	80	49	16	15	354	240	+114	113
2	Boston Bruins	80	40	26	14	345	245	+100	94
3	Toronto Maple Leafs	80	31	33	16	280	309	−29	78
4	California Golden Seals	80	19	48	13	212	316	−104	51

=== Record vs. opponents ===
Adams Division record vs. opponents

Vs. Wales Conference

Vs. Campbell Conference

Vs. Adams Division

1974–75 NHL records
Team	BOS	BUF	CAL	TOR	Total
Boston	—	1–4–1	4–2	1–2–3	6–8–4
Buffalo	4–1–1	—	4–0–2	4–1–1	12–2–4
California	2–4	0–4–2	—	1–3–2	3–11–4
Toronto	2–1–3	1–4–1	3–1–2	—	6–6–6

Vs. Norris Division

1974–75 NHL records
Team	DET	LAK	MTL	PIT	WSH	Total
Boston	4–1	2–3	0–3–2	2–1–2	4–0–1	12–8–5
Buffalo	3–1–1	1–3–1	4–0–1	3–0–2	5–0	16–4–5
California	2–2–1	1–2–2	0–5	0–4–1	3–2	6–15–4
Toronto	3–1–1	0–4–1	2–1–2	1–4	4–1	10–11–4

Vs. Patrick Division

1974–75 NHL records
Team	ATL	NYI	NYR	PHI	Total
Boston	4–0–1	2–2	3–1	2–1–1	11–4–2
Buffalo	1–2–1	2–0–2	4–1	0–3–1	7–6–4
California	2–2	1–2–1	0–2–2	2–3	5–9–3
Toronto	1–3	2–2–1	2–1–1	0–3–1	5–9–3

Vs. Smythe Division

1974–75 NHL records
Team	CHI	KCS	MIN	STL	VAN	Total
Boston	2–2	2–1–1	3–0–1	1–2–1	3–1	11–6–3
Buffalo	3–1	4–0	3–1	2–0–2	2–2	14–4–2
California	1–3	1–2–1	1–3	2–1–1	0–4	5–13–2
Toronto	2–2	2–1–1	3–1	2–0–2	1–3	10–7–3

== Schedule and results ==
1974–75 regular season
October

Game	Result	Date	Score	Opponent	Record
1	T	October 9, 1974	4–4	St. Louis Blues (1974–75)	0–0–1
2	W	October 11, 1974	3–0	Atlanta Flames (1974–75)	1–0–1
3	L	October 13, 1974	3–7	@ Detroit Red Wings (1974–75)	1–1–1
4	T	October 16, 1974	5–5	@ New York Rangers (1974–75)	1–1–2
5	L	October 17, 1974	1–6	@ Buffalo Sabres (1974–75)	1–2–2
6	L	October 19, 1974	1–5	@ Montreal Canadiens (1974–75)	1–3–2
7	L	October 20, 1974	0–5	@ Boston Bruins (1974–75)	1–4–2
8	T	October 23, 1974	4–4	Kansas City Scouts (1974–75)	1–4–3
9	W	October 25, 1974	4–1	Philadelphia Flyers (1974–75)	2–4–3
10	L	October 26, 1974	1–5	@ Los Angeles Kings (1974–75)	2–5–3
11	L	October 28, 1974	1–10	@ New York Islanders (1974–75)	2–6–3
12	L	October 30, 1974	1–4	@ Atlanta Flames (1974–75)	2–7–3

November

Game	Result	Date	Score	Opponent	Record
13	T	November 1, 1974	4–4	Detroit Red Wings (1974–75)	2–7–4
14	L	November 6, 1974	3–7	New York Rangers (1974–75)	2–8–4
15	L	November 9, 1974	2–5	@ Pittsburgh Penguins (1974–75)	2–9–4
16	L	November 10, 1974	0–3	@ Philadelphia Flyers (1974–75)	2–10–4
17	W	November 13, 1974	2–0	Chicago Black Hawks (1974–75)	3–10–4
18	L	November 15, 1974	3–5	Toronto Maple Leafs (1974–75)	3–11–4
19	L	November 17, 1974	0–10	@ New York Rangers (1974–75)	3–12–4
20	L	November 19, 1974	4–6	@ Washington Capitals (1974–75)	3–13–4
21	L	November 21, 1974	2–4	@ Boston Bruins (1974–75)	3–14–4
22	L	November 23, 1974	1–3	@ Minnesota North Stars (1974–75)	3–15–4
23	L	November 27, 1974	1–3	Boston Bruins (1974–75)	3–16–4
24	T	November 29, 1974	3–3	New York Islanders (1974–75)	3–16–5

December

Game	Result	Date	Score	Opponent	Record
25	W	December 1, 1974	5–2	@ Washington Capitals (1974–75)	4–16–5
26	L	December 3, 1974	1–5	@ St. Louis Blues (1974–75)	4–17–5
27	W	December 4, 1974	3–1	Atlanta Flames (1974–75)	5–17–5
28	W	December 6, 1974	5–3	Minnesota North Stars (1974–75)	6–17–5
29	L	December 10, 1974	0–3	@ Vancouver Canucks (1974–75)	6–18–5
30	L	December 12, 1974	3–5	@ Kansas City Scouts (1974–75)	6–19–5
31	L	December 14, 1974	3–5	@ Montreal Canadiens (1974–75)	6–20–5
32	T	December 15, 1974	5–5	@ Buffalo Sabres (1974–75)	6–20–6
33	L	December 18, 1974	3–4	Montreal Canadiens (1974–75)	6–21–6
34	W	December 20, 1974	5–2	Washington Capitals (1974–75)	7–21–6
35	L	December 22, 1974	4–6	Vancouver Canucks (1974–75)	7–22–6
36	W	December 27, 1974	5–2	Boston Bruins (1974–75)	8–22–6
37	W	December 28, 1974	3–2	@ Los Angeles Kings (1974–75)	9–22–6
38	L	December 31, 1974	3–4	@ Detroit Red Wings (1974–75)	9–23–6

January

Game	Result	Date	Score	Opponent	Record
39	T	January 1, 1975	3–3	@ Toronto Maple Leafs (1974–75)	9–23–7
40	T	January 3, 1975	2–2	Buffalo Sabres (1974–75)	9–23–8
41	W	January 5, 1975	5–1	Philadelphia Flyers (1974–75)	10–23–8
42	W	January 7, 1975	3–2	@ St. Louis Blues (1974–75)	11–23–8
43	L	January 8, 1975	2–3	@ Atlanta Flames (1974–75)	11–24–8
44	L	January 11, 1975	3–6	@ Pittsburgh Penguins (1974–75)	11–25–8
45	L	January 12, 1975	1–2	@ Philadelphia Flyers (1974–75)	11–26–8
46	L	January 15, 1975	0–4	Buffalo Sabres (1974–75)	11–27–8
47	T	January 17, 1975	4–4	New York Rangers (1974–75)	11–27–9
48	L	January 19, 1975	1–3	@ Chicago Black Hawks (1974–75)	11–28–9
49	L	January 22, 1975	5–7	@ Pittsburgh Penguins (1974–75)	11–29–9
50	W	January 24, 1975	6–1	Toronto Maple Leafs (1974–75)	12–29–9
51	L	January 26, 1975	2–3	@ Chicago Black Hawks (1974–75)	12–30–9
52	L	January 29, 1975	2–4	@ Toronto Maple Leafs (1974–75)	12–31–9
53	L	January 30, 1975	0–6	@ Boston Bruins (1974–75)	12–32–9

February

Game	Result	Date	Score	Opponent	Record
54	L	February 2, 1975	1–5	Montreal Canadiens (1974–75)	12–33–9
55	W	February 5, 1975	5–1	Washington Capitals (1974–75)	13–33–9
56	L	February 7, 1975	1–4	Pittsburgh Penguins (1974–75)	13–34–9
57	L	February 9, 1975	1–2	Kansas City Scouts (1974–75)	13–35–9
58	W	February 12, 1975	4–2	Detroit Red Wings (1974–75)	14–35–9
59	W	February 15, 1975	3–0	@ Kansas City Scouts (1974–75)	15–35–9
60	L	February 16, 1975	4–8	@ Minnesota North Stars (1974–75)	15–36–9
61	T	February 19, 1975	3–3	Toronto Maple Leafs (1974–75)	15–36–10
62	W	February 21, 1975	6–4	Boston Bruins (1974–75)	16–36–10
63	T	February 23, 1975	2–2	Los Angeles Kings (1974–75)	16–36–11
64	L	February 26, 1975	1–3	Minnesota North Stars (1974–75)	16–37–11

March

Game	Result	Date	Score	Opponent	Record
65	L	March 1, 1975	1–6	@ New York Islanders (1974–75)	16–38–11
66	L	March 3, 1975	2–4	@ Montreal Canadiens (1974–75)	16–39–11
67	L	March 5, 1975	2–4	Chicago Black Hawks (1974–75)	16–40–11
68	W	March 9, 1975	4–2	New York Islanders (1974–75)	17–40–11
69	L	March 12, 1975	2–7	Buffalo Sabres (1974–75)	17–41–11
70	W	March 14, 1975	4–2	Detroit Red Wings (1974–75)	18–41–11
71	T	March 19, 1975	3–3	Pittsburgh Penguins (1974–75)	18–41–12
72	W	March 21, 1975	7–4	St. Louis Blues (1974–75)	19–41–12
73	L	March 23, 1975	4–9	@ Buffalo Sabres (1974–75)	19–42–12
74	L	March 24, 1975	3–5	@ Toronto Maple Leafs (1974–75)	19–43–12
75	L	March 26, 1975	2–6	Philadelphia Flyers (1974–75)	19–44–12
76	L	March 28, 1975	3–5	Washington Capitals (1974–75)	19–45–12

April

Game	Result	Date	Score	Opponent	Record
77	L	April 1, 1975	0–7	@ Vancouver Canucks (1974–75)	19–46–12
78	L	April 2, 1975	0–3	Vancouver Canucks (1974–75)	19–47–12
79	L	April 5, 1975	3–5	@ Los Angeles Kings (1974–75)	19–48–12
80	T	April 6, 1975	1–1	Los Angeles Kings (1974–75)	19–48–13

Legend: Win (2 points) Loss (0 points) Tie (1 point)

== Player statistics ==
=== Skaters ===
Note: GP = Games played; G = Goals; A = Assists; Pts = Points; PIM = Penalties in minutes

		Regular season					Playoffs
Player	#	GP	G	A	Pts	PIM	GP	G	A	Pts	PIM
Larry Patey	9	79	25	20	45	68	–	–	–	–	–
Stan Weir	21	80	18	27	45	12	–	–	–	–	–
Dave Hrechkosy	18	73	29	14	43	25	–	–	–	–	–
Al MacAdam	25	80	18	25	43	55	–	–	–	–	–
John Stewart	17	75	19	19	38	55	–	–	–	–	–
Joey Johnston	22	62	14	23	37	72	–	–	–	–	–
Dave Gardner^{†}	7	64	16	20	36	6	–	–	–	–	–
Ron Huston	11	56	12	21	33	8	–	–	–	–	–
Butch Williams	12	63	11	21	32	118	–	–	–	–	–
Rick Hampton	2	78	8	17	25	39	–	–	–	–	–
Charlie Simmer	10	35	8	13	21	26	–	–	–	–	–
Jim Neilson	15	72	3	17	20	56	–	–	–	–	–
Len Frig	6	80	3	17	20	127	–	–	–	–	–
Bob Stewart	4	68	5	12	17	93	–	–	–	–	–
Mike Christie	3	34	0	14	14	76	–	–	–	–	–
George Pesut	5	47	0	13	13	73	–	–	–	–	–
Wayne King	24	25	4	7	11	8	–	–	–	–	–
Frank Spring^{†}	14	28	3	8	11	6	–	–	–	–	–
Morris Mott	20	52	3	8	11	8	–	–	–	–	–
Brian Lavender	8	65	3	7	10	48	–	–	–	–	–
Jim Moxey	19	47	5	4	9	4	–	–	–	–	–
Gilles Meloche	27	47	0	6	6	14	–	–	–	–	–
Stan Gilbertson^{‡}	10	15	1	4	5	2	–	–	–	–	–
Fred Ahern	16	3	2	1	3	0	–	–	–	–	–
Craig Patrick^{‡}	14	14	2	1	3	0	–	–	–	–	–
Terry Murray	5	9	0	2	2	8	–	–	–	–	–
Ted McAneeley	23	9	0	2	2	4	–	–	–	–	–
Gary Holt	8	1	0	1	1	0	–	–	–	–	–
Bruce Greig	28	8	0	1	1	42	–	–	–	–	–
Gary Simmons	31	34	0	1	1	26	–	–	–	–	–
Glenn Patrick	5	2	0	0	0	0	–	–	–	–	–
Larry Wright	16	2	0	0	0	0	–	–	–	–	–
Tom Price	5	3	0	0	0	4	–	–	–	–	–
Brent Meeke	24	4	0	0	0	0	–	–	–	–	–

^{†}Denotes player spent time with another team before joining Seals. Stats reflect time with the Seals only. ^{‡}Traded mid-season

=== Goaltenders ===
Note: GP = Games played; TOI = Time on ice (minutes); W = Wins; L = Losses; T = Ties; GA = Goals against; SO = Shutouts; GAA = Goals against average

		Regular season								Playoffs
Player	#	GP	TOI	W	L	T	GA	SO	GAA	GP	TOI	W	L	GA	SO	GAA
Gary Simmons	31	34	2029	10	21	3	124	2	3.67	–	–	–	–	–	–	–
Gilles Meloche	27	47	2771	9	27	10	186	1	4.03	–	–	–	–	–	–	–

== Transactions ==
The Seals were involved in the following transactions during the 1974–75 season:

=== Trades ===
May 24, 1974	To California Golden Seals Al MacAdam; Larry Wright; 1st round pick in 1974 Draft (Ron Chipperfield); Future considerations (George Pesut, December 11, 1974)	To Philadelphia Flyers Reggie Leach
May 24, 1974	To California Golden Seals Mike Christie; Len Frig	To Chicago Black Hawks Ivan Boldirev
June 18, 1974	To California Golden Seals John Stewart	To Atlanta Flames Hilliard Graves
June 18, 1974	To California Golden Seals Glenn Patrick	To St. Louis Blues Ron Serafini
September 23, 1974	To California Golden Seals Brian Lavender	To New York Rangers Hartland Monahan
October 1, 1974	To California Golden Seals Gary Simmons	To Phoenix Roadrunners (WHA) cash
November 11, 1974	To California Golden Seals Dave Gardner; Butch Williams	To St. Louis Blues Stan Gilbertson; Craig Patrick
January 9, 1975	To California Golden Seals Frank Spring	To St. Louis Blues Bruce Affleck

=== Additions and subtractions ===
Additions
Player	Former team	Via
Jim Neilson	New York Rangers	Intra-League Draft (1974-06-10)
Bob Murdoch	Cranbrook Royals (WIHL)	free agency (1974–10)

Subtractions
Player	New team	Via
Walt McKechnie	New York Rangers	Intra-League Draft (1974-06-10)
Gary Coalter	Kansas City Scouts	Expansion Draft (1974-06-12)
Gary Croteau	Kansas City Scouts	Expansion Draft (1974-06-12)
Pete Laframboise	Washington Capitals	Expansion Draft (1974-06-12)
