= 1974–75 Washington Capitals season =

NHL hockey team season

1974–75 Washington Capitals
- Division: 5th Norris
- Conference: 9th Wales
- 1974–75 record: 8–67–5
- Home record: 7–28–5
- Road record: 1–39–0
- Goals for: 181
- Goals against: 446

Team information
- General manager: Milt Schmidt
- Coach: Jim Anderson; Red Sullivan; Milt Schmidt
- Captain: Doug Mohns
- Alternate captains: Tommy Williams
- Arena: Capital Centre

Team leaders
- Goals: Tom Williams (22)
- Assists: Tom Williams (36)
- Points: Tom Williams (58)
- Penalty minutes: Yvon Labre (182)
- Wins: Ron Low (8)
- Goals against average: Michel Belhumeur (5.36)

The 1974–75 Washington Capitals season was the first in Capitals history. Along with the Kansas City Scouts, the Capitals joined the National Hockey League as an expansion team for the 1974–75 season. The team was owned by Abe Pollin, owner of the NBA's Washington Bullets. Pollin had built the Capital Centre in suburban Landover, Maryland, to house both the Bullets (who formerly played in Baltimore) and the Capitals. His first act as owner was to hire Hall of Famer Milt Schmidt as general manager.

The team's record of 8–67–5 is the worst individual season in the history of the NHL, including an all-time worst 446 goals against, with a fourth-all-time worst 5.58 team goals against average.

== Offseason ==
=== NHL draft ===
| Round | # | Player | Nationality | College/Junior/Club team |
|---|---|---|---|---|
| 1 | 1 | Greg Joly (D) | Canada | Regina Pats (WCHL) |
| 2 | 19 | Mike Marson (LW) | Canada | Sudbury Wolves (OMJHL) |
| 3 | 37 | John Paddock (RW) | Canada | Brandon Wheat Kings (WCHL) |
| 4 | 55 | Paul Nicholson (LW) | Canada | London Knights (OMJHL) |
| 5 | 73 | Jack Patterson (C) | Canada | Kamloops Chiefs (WCHL) |
| 6 | 91 | Brian Kinsella (C) | Canada | Oshawa Generals (OMJHL) |
| 7 | 109 | Garth Malarchuk (G) | Canada | Calgary Centennials (WCHL) |
| 8 | 127 | John Nazar (LW) | Canada | Cornwall Royals (QMJHL) |
| 9 | 144 | Kelvin Erickson (G) | Canada | Calgary Centennials (WCHL) |
| 10 | 161 | Tony White (LW) | Canada | Kitchener Rangers (OMJHL) |
| 11 | 176 | Ron Pronchuk (D) | Canada | Brandon Wheat Kings (WCHL) |
| 12 | 190 | Dave McKee (RW) | Canada | Oshawa Generals (OMJHL) |
| 13 | 202 | Scott Mabley (D) | Canada | Sault Ste. Marie Greyhounds (OMJHL) |
| 14 | 212 | Bernard Plante (LW) | Canada | Trois-Rivières Draveurs (QMJHL) |
| 15 | 220 | Jacques Chiasson (RW) | Canada | Drummondville Rangers (QMJHL) |
| 16 | 225 | Bill Bell (LW) | Canada | Regina Pats (WCHL) |
| 17 | 228 | Bob Blanchet (G) | Canada | Kitchener Rangers (OMJHL) |
| 18 | 231 | Johnny Bower Jr. (D) | Canada | Downsview Beavers (OPJHL) |
| 19 | 234 | Yves Plouffe (D) | Canada | Sorel Eperviers (QMJHL) |
| 20 | 237 | Terry Bozack (D) | Canada | Pembroke Lumber Kings (CJAHL) |
| 21 | 240 | Gord Cole (LW) | Canada | Brandon Wheat Kings (WCHL) |
| 22 | 242 | Mike Cosentino (C) | Canada | Hamilton Fincups (OMJHL) |
| 23 | 244 | John Duncan (D) | Canada | Cornwall Royals (QMJHL) |
| 24 | 246 | Barry Kerfoot (RW) | Canada | Smiths Falls Bears (CJAHL) |
| 25 | 247 | Ron Poole (C) | Canada | Kamloops Chiefs (WCHL) |

=== Expansion draft ===
| # | Player | Drafted From | Drafted By |
|---|---|---|---|
| 2. | Ron Low (G) | Toronto Maple Leafs | Washington Capitals |
| 4. | Michel Belhumeur (G) | Philadelphia Flyers | Washington Capitals |
| 6. | Dave Kryskow (F) | Chicago Black Hawks | Washington Capitals |
| 8. | Yvon Labre (D) | Pittsburgh Penguins | Washington Capitals |
| 10. | Pete Laframboise (LW) | California Golden Seals | Washington Capitals |
| 12. | Bob Gryp (F) | Boston Bruins | Washington Capitals |
| 14. | Gord Smith (D) | Los Angeles Kings | Washington Capitals |
| 16. | Steve Atkinson (RW) | Buffalo Sabres | Washington Capitals |
| 18. | Bruce Cowick (F) | Philadelphia Flyers | Washington Capitals |
| 20. | Denis Dupere (LW) | Toronto Maple Leafs | Washington Capitals |
| 22. | Joe Lundrigan (D) | Toronto Maple Leafs | Washington Capitals |
| 24. | Randy Wyrozub (C) | Buffalo Sabres | Washington Capitals |
| 26. | Mike Bloom (C) | Boston Bruins | Washington Capitals |
| 28. | Gord Brooks (RW) | St. Louis Blues | Washington Capitals |
| 30. | Bob Collyard (C) | St. Louis Blues | Washington Capitals |
| 32. | Bill Mikkelson (D) | New York Islanders | Washington Capitals |
| 34. | Ron Anderson (RW) | Boston Bruins | Washington Capitals |
| 36. | Mike Lampman (LW) | Vancouver Canucks | Washington Capitals |
| 38. | Lew Morrison (RW) | Atlanta Flames | Washington Capitals |
| 40. | Steve West (C) | Minnesota North Stars | Washington Capitals |
| 42. | Larry Bolonchuk (D) | Vancouver Canucks | Washington Capitals |
| 44. | Murray Anderson (D) | Minnesota North Stars | Washington Capitals |
| 46. | Larry Fullan (LW) | Montreal Canadiens | Washington Capitals |
| 48. | Jack Egers (RW) | New York Rangers | Washington Capitals |

== Regular season ==
Along with the Kansas City Scouts, the Capitals joined the NHL as an expansion team for the 1974–75 season. With a combined 30 teams between the NHL and the rival World Hockey Association, the talent pool available to stock the new teams was extremely thin. In their first season, the Capitals would set an NHL record for futility, losing 67 of 80 games, and only winning one on the road. The Scouts fared only marginally better (getting their first win against the Capitals, albeit in their tenth game of existence), and the expansion was widely seen as having been a mistake.

The Capitals' inaugural season was dreadful, even by expansion standards. They finished 8–67–5, which is the worst record in NHL history. Their 21 points were half that of their expansion brethren, the Scouts. They won only eight games, the fewest ever by a team playing at least 70 games. Their .131 winning percentage is still the worst in NHL history. They also set records for most road losses (39 out of 40), most consecutive road losses (37) and most consecutive losses (17), most of which have now been broken. Schmidt himself had to take over the coaching reins late in the season. The Capitals failed to qualify for the playoffs.

They won their only road game against the California Golden Seals in the 76th game of the season and third-to-last road game of the season.

Of Washington's eight wins, seven of them were decided by two goals or more, with their season superlative 8–4 win in their final game.

The last remaining active member of the 1974–75 Washington Capitals was Ron Low, who played his final NHL game in the 1984–85 season.

=== Final standings ===
Norris Division
| | | GP | W | L | T | GF | GA | DIFF | Pts |
|---|---|---|---|---|---|---|---|---|---|
| 1 | Montreal Canadiens | 80 | 47 | 14 | 19 | 374 | 225 | +149 | 113 |
| 2 | Los Angeles Kings | 80 | 42 | 17 | 21 | 269 | 185 | +84 | 105 |
| 3 | Pittsburgh Penguins | 80 | 37 | 28 | 15 | 326 | 289 | +37 | 89 |
| 4 | Detroit Red Wings | 80 | 23 | 45 | 12 | 259 | 335 | −76 | 58 |
| 5 | Washington Capitals | 80 | 8 | 67 | 5 | 181 | 446 | −265 | 21 |

=== Record vs. opponents ===
Norris Division record vs. opponents

Vs. Wales Conference

Vs. Campbell Conference

Vs. Norris Division

1974–75 NHL records
| Team | DET | LAK | MTL | PIT | WSH | Total |
|---|---|---|---|---|---|---|
| Detroit | — | 0–5–1 | 0–4–2 | 2–4 | 5–1 | 7–14–3 |
| Los Angeles | 5–0–1 | — | 1–2–3 | 3–1–2 | 5–0–1 | 14–3–7 |
| Montreal | 4–0–2 | 2–1–3 | — | 4–1–1 | 6–0 | 16–2–6 |
| Pittsburgh | 4–2 | 1–3–2 | 1–4–1 | — | 5–1 | 11–10–3 |
| Washington | 1–5 | 0–5–1 | 0–6 | 1–5 | — | 2–21–1 |

Vs. Adams Division

1974–75 NHL records
| Team | BOS | BUF | CAL | TOR | Total |
|---|---|---|---|---|---|
| Detroit | 1–4 | 1–3–1 | 2–2–1 | 1–3–1 | 5–12–3 |
| Los Angeles | 3–2 | 3–1–1 | 2–1–2 | 4–0–1 | 12–4–4 |
| Montreal | 3–0–2 | 0–4–1 | 5–0 | 1–2–2 | 9–6–5 |
| Pittsburgh | 1–2–2 | 0–3–2 | 4–0–1 | 4–1 | 9–6–5 |
| Washington | 0–4–1 | 0–5 | 2–3 | 1–4 | 3–16–1 |

Vs. Patrick Division

1974–75 NHL records
| Team | ATL | NYI | NYR | PHI | Total |
|---|---|---|---|---|---|
| Detroit | 2–2 | 2–2 | 1–2–1 | 1–2–1 | 6–8–2 |
| Los Angeles | 1–2–1 | 0–1–3 | 1–1–2 | 1–2–1 | 3–6–7 |
| Montreal | 3–0–1 | 0–2–2 | 2–0–2 | 1–2–1 | 6–4–6 |
| Pittsburgh | 1–1–2 | 2–2 | 2–2 | 1–3 | 6–8–2 |
| Washington | 0–3–1 | 0–4 | 1–2–1 | 0–4 | 1–13–2 |

Vs. Smythe Division

1974–75 NHL records
| Team | CHI | KCS | MIN | STL | VAN | Total |
|---|---|---|---|---|---|---|
| Detroit | 1–2–1 | 3–1 | 0–2–2 | 0–3–1 | 1–3 | 5–11–4 |
| Los Angeles | 2–2 | 3–1 | 4–0 | 3–0–1 | 1–1–2 | 13–4–3 |
| Montreal | 3–0–1 | 4–0 | 4–0 | 1–2–1 | 4–0 | 16–2–2 |
| Pittsburgh | 2–1–1 | 2–0–2 | 3–1 | 1–1–2 | 3–1 | 11–4–5 |
| Washington | 1–3 | 1–3 | 0–3–1 | 0–4 | 0–4 | 2–17–1 |

== Schedule and results ==
1974–75 regular season
October

| Game | Result | Date | Score | Opponent | Record |
|---|---|---|---|---|---|
| 1 | L | October 9, 1974 | 3–6 | @ New York Rangers (1974–75) | 0–1–0 |
| 2 | L | October 12, 1974 | 0–6 | @ Minnesota North Stars (1974–75) | 0–2–0 |
| 3 | T | October 15, 1974 | 1–1 | Los Angeles Kings (1974–75) | 0–2–1 |
| 4 | W | October 17, 1974 | 4–3 | Chicago Black Hawks (1974–75) | 1–2–1 |
| 5 | L | October 19, 1974 | 4–6 | @ Detroit Red Wings (1974–75) | 1–3–1 |
| 6 | L | October 20, 1974 | 0–5 | New York Islanders (1974–75) | 1–4–1 |
| 7 | L | October 22, 1974 | 0–3 | Detroit Red Wings (1974–75) | 1–5–1 |
| 8 | L | October 23, 1974 | 2–3 | @ Chicago Black Hawks (1974–75) | 1–6–1 |
| 9 | L | October 27, 1974 | 3–4 | Toronto Maple Leafs (1974–75) | 1–7–1 |
| 10 | L | October 31, 1974 | 0–3 | Montreal Canadiens (1974–75) | 1–8–1 |

November

| Game | Result | Date | Score | Opponent | Record |
|---|---|---|---|---|---|
| 11 | L | November 3, 1974 | 4–5 | Kansas City Scouts (1974–75) | 1–9–1 |
| 12 | L | November 7, 1974 | 4–10 | @ Boston Bruins (1974–75) | 1–10–1 |
| 13 | L | November 9, 1974 | 2–6 | @ Philadelphia Flyers (1974–75) | 1–11–1 |
| 14 | L | November 10, 1974 | 1–11 | Montreal Canadiens (1974–75) | 1–12–1 |
| 15 | T | November 12, 1974 | 2–2 | Atlanta Flames (1974–75) | 1–12–2 |
| 16 | L | November 13, 1974 | 3–4 | @ Atlanta Flames (1974–75) | 1–13–2 |
| 17 | L | November 16, 1974 | 1–8 | @ Pittsburgh Penguins (1974–75) | 1–14–2 |
| 18 | L | November 17, 1974 | 0–6 | Pittsburgh Penguins (1974–75) | 1–15–2 |
| 19 | W | November 19, 1974 | 6–4 | California Golden Seals (1974–75) | 2–15–2 |
| 20 | L | November 20, 1974 | 3–7 | @ Buffalo Sabres (1974–75) | 2–16–2 |
| 21 | T | November 24, 1974 | 4–4 | Minnesota North Stars (1974–75) | 2–16–3 |
| 22 | L | November 27, 1974 | 4–6 | @ Minnesota North Stars (1974–75) | 2–17–3 |
| 23 | L | November 30, 1974 | 1–7 | @ Toronto Maple Leafs (1974–75) | 2–18–3 |

December

| Game | Result | Date | Score | Opponent | Record |
|---|---|---|---|---|---|
| 24 | L | December 1, 1974 | 2–5 | California Golden Seals (1974–75) | 2–19–3 |
| 25 | L | December 3, 1974 | 3–5 | Buffalo Sabres (1974–75) | 2–20–3 |
| 26 | L | December 5, 1974 | 2–9 | @ Buffalo Sabres (1974–75) | 2–21–3 |
| 27 | L | December 7, 1974 | 2–8 | @ St. Louis Blues (1974–75) | 2–22–3 |
| 28 | L | December 8, 1974 | 1–3 | St. Louis Blues (1974–75) | 2–23–3 |
| 29 | T | December 12, 1974 | 6–6 | New York Rangers (1974–75) | 2–23–4 |
| 30 | L | December 14, 1974 | 1–12 | @ Boston Bruins (1974–75) | 2–24–4 |
| 31 | W | December 15, 1974 | 3–1 | Toronto Maple Leafs (1974–75) | 3–24–4 |
| 32 | L | December 17, 1974 | 2–4 | @ Vancouver Canucks (1974–75) | 3–25–4 |
| 33 | L | December 19, 1974 | 1–4 | @ Los Angeles Kings (1974–75) | 3–26–4 |
| 34 | L | December 20, 1974 | 2–5 | @ California Golden Seals (1974–75) | 3–27–4 |
| 35 | L | December 22, 1974 | 0–4 | Buffalo Sabres (1974–75) | 3–28–4 |
| 36 | L | December 26, 1974 | 1–4 | Philadelphia Flyers (1974–75) | 3–29–4 |
| 37 | L | December 29, 1974 | 0–7 | New York Islanders (1974–75) | 3–30–4 |

January

| Game | Result | Date | Score | Opponent | Record |
|---|---|---|---|---|---|
| 38 | L | January 2, 1975 | 2–5 | @ New York Islanders (1974–75) | 3–31–4 |
| 39 | L | January 4, 1975 | 0–10 | @ Montreal Canadiens (1974–75) | 3–32–4 |
| 40 | L | January 5, 1975 | 0–3 | @ Atlanta Flames (1974–75) | 3–33–4 |
| 41 | T | January 7, 1975 | 3–3 | Boston Bruins (1974–75) | 3–33–5 |
| 42 | L | January 11, 1975 | 3–5 | @ Kansas City Scouts (1974–75) | 3–34–5 |
| 43 | L | January 12, 1975 | 2–7 | Montreal Canadiens (1974–75) | 3–35–5 |
| 44 | L | January 14, 1975 | 2–6 | Los Angeles Kings (1974–75) | 3–36–5 |
| 45 | L | January 16, 1975 | 0–4 | @ Philadelphia Flyers (1974–75) | 3–37–5 |
| 46 | L | January 19, 1975 | 2–3 | Pittsburgh Penguins (1974–75) | 3–38–5 |
| 47 | L | January 23, 1975 | 2–3 | Vancouver Canucks (1974–75) | 3–39–5 |
| 48 | L | January 25, 1975 | 2–5 | @ Detroit Red Wings (1974–75) | 3–40–5 |
| 49 | W | January 26, 1975 | 6–3 | Detroit Red Wings (1974–75) | 4–40–5 |
| 50 | L | January 30, 1975 | 4–6 | @ Los Angeles Kings (1974–75) | 4–41–5 |

February

| Game | Result | Date | Score | Opponent | Record |
|---|---|---|---|---|---|
| 51 | L | February 1, 1975 | 2–5 | @ Vancouver Canucks (1974–75) | 4–42–5 |
| 52 | L | February 5, 1975 | 1–5 | @ California Golden Seals (1974–75) | 4–43–5 |
| 53 | L | February 8, 1975 | 1–5 | @ New York Islanders (1974–75) | 4–44–5 |
| 54 | L | February 9, 1975 | 3–7 | @ New York Rangers (1974–75) | 4–45–5 |
| 55 | W | February 11, 1975 | 7–4 | New York Rangers (1974–75) | 5–45–5 |
| 56 | L | February 13, 1975 | 1–5 | @ Kansas City Scouts (1974–75) | 5–46–5 |
| 57 | L | February 15, 1975 | 1–7 | @ St. Louis Blues (1974–75) | 5–47–5 |
| 58 | W | February 16, 1975 | 3–0 | Kansas City Scouts (1974–75) | 6–47–5 |
| 59 | L | February 18, 1975 | 1–6 | Los Angeles Kings (1974–75) | 6–48–5 |
| 60 | L | February 21, 1975 | 4–9 | Buffalo Sabres (1974–75) | 6–49–5 |
| 61 | L | February 22, 1975 | 3–10 | @ Chicago Black Hawks (1974–75) | 6–50–5 |
| 62 | L | February 23, 1975 | 2–7 | St. Louis Blues (1974–75) | 6–51–5 |
| 63 | L | February 25, 1975 | 2–6 | Chicago Black Hawks (1974–75) | 6–52–5 |
| 64 | L | February 26, 1975 | 1–3 | @ Pittsburgh Penguins (1974–75) | 6–53–5 |

March

| Game | Result | Date | Score | Opponent | Record |
|---|---|---|---|---|---|
| 65 | L | March 1, 1975 | 4–5 | @ Toronto Maple Leafs (1974–75) | 6–54–5 |
| 66 | L | March 2, 1975 | 3–7 | Vancouver Canucks (1974–75) | 6–55–5 |
| 67 | L | March 4, 1975 | 0–8 | Boston Bruins (1974–75) | 6–56–5 |
| 68 | L | March 7, 1975 | 4–8 | @ Montreal Canadiens (1974–75) | 6–57–5 |
| 69 | L | March 9, 1975 | 2–4 | Toronto Maple Leafs (1974–75) | 6–58–5 |
| 70 | L | March 15, 1975 | 1–12 | @ Pittsburgh Penguins (1974–75) | 6–59–5 |
| 71 | L | March 18, 1975 | 2–7 | Philadelphia Flyers (1974–75) | 6–60–5 |
| 72 | L | March 20, 1975 | 1–5 | Minnesota North Stars (1974–75) | 6–61–5 |
| 73 | L | March 22, 1975 | 2–8 | @ Boston Bruins (1974–75) | 6–62–5 |
| 74 | L | March 23, 1975 | 0–5 | Atlanta Flames (1974–75) | 6–63–5 |
| 75 | L | March 26, 1975 | 1–5 | @ Los Angeles Kings (1974–75) | 6–64–5 |
| 76 | W | March 28, 1975 | 5–3 | @ California Golden Seals (1974–75) | 7–64–5 |
| 77 | L | March 30, 1975 | 5–8 | Detroit Red Wings (1974–75) | 7–65–5 |

April

| Game | Result | Date | Score | Opponent | Record |
|---|---|---|---|---|---|
| 78 | L | April 2, 1975 | 3–8 | @ Detroit Red Wings (1974–75) | 7–66–5 |
| 79 | L | April 5, 1975 | 2–10 | @ Montreal Canadiens (1974–75) | 7–67–5 |
| 80 | W | April 6, 1975 | 8–4 | Pittsburgh Penguins (1974–75) | 8–67–5 |

Legend: Win (2 points) Loss (0 points) Tie (1 point)

== Player statistics ==
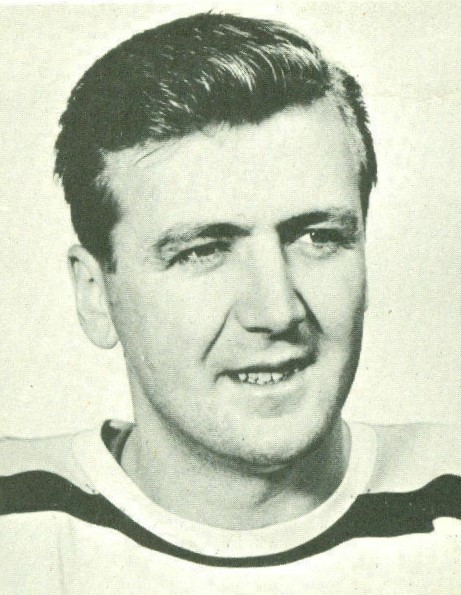
Tommy Williams led the Capitals in scoring with 58 points in 73 games

=== Regular season ===
Scoring

| Player | Pos | GP | G | A | Pts | PIM | +/- | PPG | SHG | GWG |
|---|---|---|---|---|---|---|---|---|---|---|
| Tommy Williams | RW | 73 | 22 | 36 | 58 | 12 | -48 | 7 | 2 | 1 |
| Denis Dupere | LW | 53 | 20 | 15 | 35 | 8 | -41 | 8 | 0 | 0 |
| Mike Marson | LW | 76 | 16 | 12 | 28 | 59 | -65 | 5 | 0 | 2 |
| Yvon Labre | D | 76 | 4 | 23 | 27 | 182 | -54 | 0 | 0 | 0 |
| Ron Lalonde | C | 50 | 12 | 14 | 26 | 27 | -39 | 4 | 1 | 1 |
| Mike Bloom | LW | 67 | 7 | 19 | 26 | 84 | -54 | 0 | 0 | 0 |
| Dave Kryskow | LW | 51 | 9 | 15 | 24 | 83 | -28 | 1 | 1 | 0 |
| Doug Mohns | LW/D | 75 | 2 | 19 | 21 | 54 | -52 | 1 | 0 | 0 |
| Bill Lesuk | LW | 79 | 8 | 11 | 19 | 77 | -34 | 1 | 2 | 0 |
| Stan Gilbertson | LW | 25 | 11 | 7 | 18 | 12 | -37 | 2 | 0 | 1 |
| Garnet Bailey | LW | 22 | 4 | 13 | 17 | 8 | -29 | 1 | 0 | 0 |
| Ron Anderson | RW | 28 | 9 | 7 | 16 | 8 | -20 | 4 | 0 | 0 |
| Steve Atkinson | RW | 46 | 11 | 4 | 15 | 8 | -26 | 3 | 2 | 0 |
| Pete Laframboise | LW/C | 45 | 5 | 10 | 15 | 22 | -37 | 0 | 0 | 0 |
| Bob Gryp | LW | 27 | 5 | 8 | 13 | 21 | -24 | 0 | 0 | 0 |
| Bruce Cowick | LW | 65 | 5 | 6 | 11 | 41 | -42 | 0 | 0 | 0 |
| Gord Smith | D | 63 | 3 | 8 | 11 | 56 | -56 | 2 | 0 | 0 |
| Gord Brooks | RW | 38 | 1 | 10 | 11 | 25 | -19 | 1 | 0 | 0 |
| Nelson Pyatt | C | 16 | 6 | 4 | 10 | 21 | -14 | 0 | 0 | 1 |
| Jim Hrycuik | C | 21 | 5 | 5 | 10 | 12 | -12 | 1 | 0 | 0 |
| Bill Mikkelson | D | 59 | 3 | 7 | 10 | 52 | -82 | 3 | 0 | 0 |
| Paul Nicholson | LW | 39 | 4 | 5 | 9 | 7 | -29 | 0 | 0 | 1 |
| Greg Joly | D | 44 | 1 | 7 | 8 | 44 | -68 | 1 | 0 | 0 |
| Jack Lynch | D | 20 | 1 | 5 | 6 | 16 | -54 | 0 | 0 | 0 |
| Jack Egers | RW | 14 | 3 | 2 | 5 | 8 | -14 | 1 | 0 | 1 |
| Lew Morrison | RW | 18 | 0 | 4 | 4 | 6 | -14 | 0 | 0 | 0 |
| Ron Jones | D | 19 | 1 | 1 | 2 | 16 | -14 | 1 | 0 | 0 |
| Michel Belhumeur | G | 35 | 0 | 2 | 2 | 10 | 0 | 0 | 0 | 0 |
| Tony White | LW | 5 | 0 | 2 | 2 | 0 | 0 | 0 | 0 | 0 |
| Willie Brossart | D | 12 | 1 | 0 | 1 | 14 | -14 | 0 | 0 | 0 |
| Larry Fullan | LW | 4 | 1 | 0 | 1 | 0 | -2 | 1 | 0 | 0 |
| Blair Stewart | C | 2 | 1 | 0 | 1 | 2 | -2 | 0 | 0 | 0 |
| Murray Anderson | D | 40 | 0 | 1 | 1 | 68 | -40 | 0 | 0 | 0 |
| John Adams | G | 8 | 0 | 0 | 0 | 2 | 0 | 0 | 0 | 0 |
| Ron Low | G | 48 | 0 | 0 | 0 | 4 | 0 | 0 | 0 | 0 |
| Joe Lundrigan | D | 3 | 0 | 0 | 0 | 2 | -3 | 0 | 0 | 0 |
| Andre Peloffy | C | 9 | 0 | 0 | 0 | 0 | -8 | 0 | 0 | 0 |
| Bill Riley | RW | 1 | 0 | 0 | 0 | 0 | -1 | 0 | 0 | 0 |
| Rod Seiling | D | 1 | 0 | 0 | 0 | 0 | 0 | 0 | 0 | 0 |

Goaltending

| Player | GP | MIN | W | L | T | GA | GAA | SO |
|---|---|---|---|---|---|---|---|---|
| Ron Low | 48 | 2588 | 8 | 36 | 2 | 235 | 5.45 | 1 |
| Michel Belhumeur | 35 | 1812 | 0 | 24 | 3 | 162 | 5.36 | 0 |
| John Adams | 8 | 400 | 0 | 7 | 0 | 46 | 6.90 | 0 |
| Team: | 80 | 4800 | 8 | 67 | 5 | 446 (Note: Team total Goals Against includes three empty-net goals) | 5.58 | 1 |

Note: GP = Games played; G = Goals; A = Assists; Pts = Points; +/- = Plus/minus; PIM = Penalty minutes; PPG=Power-play goals; SHG=Short-handed goals; GWG=Game-winning goals
MIN=Minutes played; W = Wins; L = Losses; T = Ties; GA = Goals against; GAA = Goals against average; SO = Shutouts;
