= 1974–75 Montreal Canadiens season =

NHL hockey team season

1974–75 Montreal Canadiens
- Norris Division champions
- Division: 1st Norris
- Conference: 2nd Wales
- 1974–75 record: 47–14–19
- Home record: 27–8–5
- Road record: 20–6–14
- Goals for: 374
- Goals against: 225

Team information
- General manager: Sam Pollock
- Coach: Scotty Bowman
- Captain: Henri Richard
- Alternate captains: Yvan Cournoyer; Pete Mahovlich
- Arena: Montreal Forum

Team leaders
- Goals: Guy Lafleur (53)
- Assists: Pete Mahovlich (82)
- Points: Guy Lafleur (117)
- Penalty minutes: Doug Risebrough (198)
- Plus/minus: Serge Savard (+71)
- Wins: Ken Dryden (30)
- Goals against average: Ken Dryden (2.69)

The 1974–75 Montreal Canadiens season was the 66th season in team history. The Montreal Canadiens were eliminated in the semi-finals against the Buffalo Sabres four games to two. Henri Richard would play his final season with the club.

== Offseason ==
Frank Mahovlich left the Canadiens, signing with the Toronto Toros of the World Hockey Association (WHA). Jacques Laperriere retired, he and Scotty Bowman unable to get along. Ken Dryden returned to the club after his law articling.

== Regular season ==
Henri Richard entered his 20th season with the Canadiens, but his health was failing. He played 16 games before fracturing his left ankle on November 13, 1974, in a game against Buffalo and did not play again until the spring.

Guy Lafleur had a break-out season, breaking the Canadiens' goal-scoring record of 50 goals held by Maurice Richard and Bernie Geoffrion. Lafleur finished with 53 goals and 119 points. Lafleur finally realized his potential despite a slow start to the season and missing 10 games in mid-season with an injury.

=== Final standings ===
Norris Division
		GP	W	L	T	GF	GA	DIFF	Pts
1	Montreal Canadiens	80	47	14	19	374	225	+149	113
2	Los Angeles Kings	80	42	17	21	269	185	+84	105
3	Pittsburgh Penguins	80	37	28	15	326	289	+37	89
4	Detroit Red Wings	80	23	45	12	259	335	−76	58
5	Washington Capitals	80	8	67	5	181	446	−265	21

=== Record vs. opponents ===
Norris Division record vs. opponents

Vs. Wales Conference

Vs. Campbell Conference

Vs. Norris Division

1974–75 NHL records
Team	DET	LAK	MTL	PIT	WSH	Total
Detroit	—	0–5–1	0–4–2	2–4	5–1	7–14–3
Los Angeles	5–0–1	—	1–2–3	3–1–2	5–0–1	14–3–7
Montreal	4–0–2	2–1–3	—	4–1–1	6–0	16–2–6
Pittsburgh	4–2	1–3–2	1–4–1	—	5–1	11–10–3
Washington	1–5	0–5–1	0–6	1–5	—	2–21–1

Vs. Adams Division

1974–75 NHL records
Team	BOS	BUF	CAL	TOR	Total
Detroit	1–4	1–3–1	2–2–1	1–3–1	5–12–3
Los Angeles	3–2	3–1–1	2–1–2	4–0–1	12–4–4
Montreal	3–0–2	0–4–1	5–0	1–2–2	9–6–5
Pittsburgh	1–2–2	0–3–2	4–0–1	4–1	9–6–5
Washington	0–4–1	0–5	2–3	1–4	3–16–1

Vs. Patrick Division

1974–75 NHL records
Team	ATL	NYI	NYR	PHI	Total
Detroit	2–2	2–2	1–2–1	1–2–1	6–8–2
Los Angeles	1–2–1	0–1–3	1–1–2	1–2–1	3–6–7
Montreal	3–0–1	0–2–2	2–0–2	1–2–1	6–4–6
Pittsburgh	1–1–2	2–2	2–2	1–3	6–8–2
Washington	0–3–1	0–4	1–2–1	0–4	1–13–2

Vs. Smythe Division

1974–75 NHL records
Team	CHI	KCS	MIN	STL	VAN	Total
Detroit	1–2–1	3–1	0–2–2	0–3–1	1–3	5–11–4
Los Angeles	2–2	3–1	4–0	3–0–1	1–1–2	13–4–3
Montreal	3–0–1	4–0	4–0	1–2–1	4–0	16–2–2
Pittsburgh	2–1–1	2–0–2	3–1	1–1–2	3–1	11–4–5
Washington	1–3	1–3	0–3–1	0–4	0–4	2–17–1

== Schedule and results ==
1974–75 regular season
October

Game	Result	Date	Score	Opponent	Record
1	T	October 9, 1974	5–5	New York Islanders (1974–75)	0–0–1
2	T	October 12, 1974	4–4	Los Angeles Kings (1974–75)	0–0–2
3	L	October 15, 1974	3–6	@ New York Islanders (1974–75)	0–1–2
4	L	October 17, 1974	2–3	@ St. Louis Blues (1974–75)	0–2–2
5	W	October 19, 1974	5–1	California Golden Seals (1974–75)	1–2–2
6	T	October 20, 1974	2–2	@ Philadelphia Flyers (1974–75)	1–2–3
7	W	October 23, 1974	3–2	@ Toronto Maple Leafs (1974–75)	2–2–3
8	W	October 26, 1974	4–2	Detroit Red Wings (1974–75)	3–2–3
9	L	October 27, 1974	2–3	@ Buffalo Sabres (1974–75)	3–3–3
10	T	October 30, 1974	4–4	Chicago Black Hawks (1974–75)	3–3–4
11	W	October 31, 1974	3–0	@ Washington Capitals (1974–75)	4–3–4

November

Game	Result	Date	Score	Opponent	Record
12	L	November 2, 1974	0–3	Philadelphia Flyers (1974–75)	4–4–4
13	W	November 4, 1974	6–1	Minnesota North Stars (1974–75)	5–4–4
14	T	November 6, 1974	4–4	@ Detroit Red Wings (1974–75)	5–4–5
15	W	November 9, 1974	4–3	Vancouver Canucks (1974–75)	6–4–5
16	W	November 10, 1974	11–1	@ Washington Capitals (1974–75)	7–4–5
17	L	November 13, 1974	6–8	Buffalo Sabres (1974–75)	7–5–5
18	W	November 14, 1974	4–1	@ Boston Bruins (1974–75)	8–5–5
19	T	November 16, 1974	4–4	New York Rangers (1974–75)	8–5–6
20	W	November 18, 1974	9–4	Minnesota North Stars (1974–75)	9–5–6
21	T	November 20, 1974	3–3	@ Los Angeles Kings (1974–75)	9–5–7
22	W	November 22, 1974	7–6	@ Kansas City Scouts (1974–75)	10–5–7
23	L	November 24, 1974	4–6	@ Buffalo Sabres (1974–75)	10–6–7
24	W	November 27, 1974	3–2	@ Pittsburgh Penguins (1974–75)	11–6–7
25	W	November 30, 1974	7–1	St. Louis Blues (1974–75)	12–6–7

December

Game	Result	Date	Score	Opponent	Record
26	W	December 2, 1974	2–0	Atlanta Flames (1974–75)	13–6–7
27	T	December 4, 1974	4–4	Boston Bruins (1974–75)	13–6–8
28	W	December 7, 1974	5–2	Pittsburgh Penguins (1974–75)	14–6–8
29	T	December 8, 1974	3–3	@ New York Rangers (1974–75)	14–6–9
30	W	December 10, 1974	5–3	@ Minnesota North Stars (1974–75)	15–6–9
31	T	December 12, 1974	3–3	@ Pittsburgh Penguins (1974–75)	15–6–10
32	W	December 14, 1974	5–3	California Golden Seals (1974–75)	16–6–10
33	W	December 18, 1974	4–3	@ California Golden Seals (1974–75)	17–6–10
34	W	December 20, 1974	6–1	@ Vancouver Canucks (1974–75)	18–6–10
35	T	December 21, 1974	2–2	@ Los Angeles Kings (1974–75)	18–6–11
36	W	December 27, 1974	7–1	Detroit Red Wings (1974–75)	19–6–11
37	W	December 28, 1974	7–2	Kansas City Scouts (1974–75)	20–6–11

January

Game	Result	Date	Score	Opponent	Record
38	T	January 2, 1975	1–1	@ Atlanta Flames (1974–75)	20–6–12
39	W	January 4, 1975	10–0	Washington Capitals (1974–75)	21–6–12
40	W	January 5, 1975	6–4	@ Chicago Black Hawks (1974–75)	22–6–12
41	T	January 8, 1975	4–4	@ Detroit Red Wings (1974–75)	22–6–13
42	W	January 11, 1975	6–0	Philadelphia Flyers (1974–75)	23–6–13
43	W	January 12, 1975	7–2	@ Washington Capitals (1974–75)	24–6–13
44	W	January 15, 1975	5–3	Boston Bruins (1974–75)	25–6–13
45	L	January 18, 1975	3–5	Toronto Maple Leafs (1974–75)	25–7–13
46	L	January 19, 1975	3–6	Los Angeles Kings (1974–75)	25–8–13
47	W	January 23, 1975	7–0	@ Minnesota North Stars (1974–75)	26–8–13
48	L	January 25, 1975	6–7	Buffalo Sabres (1974–75)	26–9–13
49	W	January 26, 1975	7–2	Pittsburgh Penguins (1974–75)	27–9–13
50	W	January 28, 1975	3–1	@ Vancouver Canucks (1974–75)	28–9–13

February

Game	Result	Date	Score	Opponent	Record
51	W	February 1, 1975	5–3	@ Los Angeles Kings (1974–75)	29–9–13
52	W	February 2, 1975	5–1	@ California Golden Seals (1974–75)	30–9–13
53	W	February 5, 1975	8–5	Detroit Red Wings (1974–75)	31–9–13
54	W	February 8, 1975	7–1	New York Rangers (1974–75)	32–9–13
55	T	February 9, 1975	4–4	@ Buffalo Sabres (1974–75)	32–9–14
56	T	February 12, 1975	2–2	@ Toronto Maple Leafs (1974–75)	32–9–15
57	W	February 15, 1975	12–3	Chicago Black Hawks (1974–75)	33–9–15
58	W	February 16, 1975	6–3	@ Chicago Black Hawks (1974–75)	34–9–15
59	T	February 18, 1975	4–4	@ St. Louis Blues (1974–75)	34–9–16
60	W	February 20, 1975	6–3	@ Kansas City Scouts (1974–75)	35–9–16
61	L	February 22, 1975	6–7	New York Islanders (1974–75)	35–10–16
62	W	February 26, 1975	4–3	Vancouver Canucks (1974–75)	36–10–16

March

Game	Result	Date	Score	Opponent	Record
63	L	March 1, 1975	3–4	St. Louis Blues (1974–75)	36–11–16
64	W	March 3, 1975	4–2	California Golden Seals (1974–75)	37–11–16
65	W	March 5, 1975	4–3	@ Atlanta Flames (1974–75)	38–11–16
66	W	March 7, 1975	8–4	Washington Capitals (1974–75)	39–11–16
67	W	March 9, 1975	5–3	@ New York Rangers (1974–75)	40–11–16
68	T	March 12, 1975	3–3	@ Toronto Maple Leafs (1974–75)	40–11–17
69	W	March 15, 1975	3–0	Los Angeles Kings (1974–75)	41–11–17
70	W	March 17, 1975	5–1	Atlanta Flames (1974–75)	42–11–17
71	W	March 19, 1975	2–1	Boston Bruins (1974–75)	43–11–17
72	L	March 22, 1975	4–6	Toronto Maple Leafs (1974–75)	43–12–17
73	L	March 23, 1975	1–2	@ Philadelphia Flyers (1974–75)	43–13–17
74	T	March 25, 1975	3–3	@ New York Islanders (1974–75)	43–13–18
75	L	March 26, 1975	4–6	@ Pittsburgh Penguins (1974–75)	43–14–18
76	W	March 29, 1975	4–1	Kansas City Scouts (1974–75)	44–14–18
77	T	March 30, 1975	2–2	@ Boston Bruins (1974–75)	44–14–19

April

Game	Result	Date	Score	Opponent	Record
78	W	April 2, 1975	6–0	Pittsburgh Penguins (1974–75)	45–14–19
79	W	April 5, 1975	10–2	Washington Capitals (1974–75)	46–14–19
80	W	April 6, 1975	4–2	@ Detroit Red Wings (1974–75)	47–14–19

Legend: Win (2 points) Loss (0 points) Tie (1 point)

== Player statistics ==
=== Regular season ===
==== Scoring ====
Player	Pos	GP	G	A	Pts	PIM	+/-	PPG	SHG	GWG
Guy Lafleur	RW	70	53	66	119	37	52	15	2	11
Pete Mahovlich	C	80	35	82	117	64	41	13	1	3
Jacques Lemaire	C	80	36	56	92	20	25	12	0	8
Guy Lapointe	D	80	28	47	75	88	46	11	1	0
Yvan Cournoyer	RW	76	29	45	74	32	15	11	0	2
Yvon Lambert	LW	80	32	35	67	74	26	10	0	3
Steve Shutt	LW	77	30	35	65	40	40	3	0	5
Larry Robinson	D	80	14	47	61	76	61	1	0	2
Serge Savard	D	80	20	40	60	64	71	7	1	2
Doug Risebrough	C	64	15	32	47	198	27	2	0	2
Murray Wilson	LW	73	24	18	42	44	13	4	0	6
Mario Tremblay	RW	63	21	18	39	108	23	0	0	1
Bob Gainey	LW	80	17	20	37	49	23	1	0	2
Jim Roberts	D/RW	79	5	13	18	52	18	0	2	0
Glen Sather	LW	63	6	10	16	44	14	0	1	0
Henri Richard	C	16	3	10	13	4	9	0	0	0
Pierre Bouchard	D	79	3	9	12	65	24	0	0	0
Don Awrey	D	56	1	11	12	58	21	0	0	0
Claude Larose	RW	8	1	2	3	6	−2	0	0	0
Chuck Lefley	LW	18	1	2	3	4	0	0	0	0
Ken Dryden	G	56	0	3	3	2	0	0	0	0
John Van Boxmeer	D	9	0	2	2	0	−1	0	0	0
Glenn Goldup	RW	9	0	1	1	2	−1	0	0	0
Michel Larocque	G	25	0	1	1	2	0	0	0	0
Ron Andruff	C	5	0	0	0	2	−1	0	0	0
Rick Chartraw	D/RW	12	0	0	0	6	−4	0	0	0

==== Goaltending ====
Player	MIN	GP	W	L	T	GA	GAA	SO
Ken Dryden	3320	56	30	9	16	149	2.69	4
Michel Larocque	1480	25	17	5	3	74	3.00	3
Team:	4800	80	47	14	19	223	2.79	7

=== Playoffs ===
==== Scoring ====
Player	Pos	GP	G	A	Pts	PIM	PPG	SHG	GWG
Guy Lafleur	RW	11	12	7	19	15	4	0	4
Pete Mahovlich	C	11	6	10	16	10	1	0	1
Jacques Lemaire	C	11	5	7	12	4	1	0	0
Yvan Cournoyer	RW	11	5	6	11	4	2	0	0
Guy Lapointe	D	11	6	4	10	4	3	1	0
Doug Risebrough	C	11	3	5	8	37	0	0	0
Serge Savard	D	11	1	7	8	2	0	0	0
Steve Shutt	LW	9	1	6	7	4	0	0	0
Yvon Lambert	LW	11	4	2	6	0	2	0	0
Bob Gainey	LW	11	2	4	6	4	0	0	1
Don Awrey	D	11	0	6	6	12	0	0	0
Jim Roberts	D/RW	11	2	2	4	2	0	0	0
Larry Robinson	D	11	0	4	4	27	0	0	0
Henri Richard	C	6	1	2	3	4	0	0	0
Murray Wilson	LW	5	0	3	3	4	0	0	0
Glen Sather	LW	11	1	1	2	4	0	0	0
Pierre Bouchard	D	10	0	2	2	10	0	0	0
Mario Tremblay	RW	11	0	1	1	7	0	0	0
Ken Dryden	G	11	0	0	0	0	0	0	0

==== Goaltending ====
Player	MIN	GP	W	L	GA	GAA	SO
Ken Dryden	688	11	6	5	29	2.53	2
Team:	688	11	6	5	29	2.53	2

Note:

Pos = Position;GP = Games played; G = Goals; A = Assists; Pts = Points; PIM = Penalty minutes; +/- = Plus/minus; PPG = Power-play goals; SHG = Short-handed goals; GWG = Game-winning goals
Pos = Position;GP = Games played; Min, TOI = Minutes played; W = Wins; L = Losses; T,T/OT = Ties; OTL = Overtime losses; GA = Goals-against; GAA = Goals-against average; SO = Shutouts; SA = Shots against; SV = Shots saved;SV% = Save percentage;

== Playoffs ==
The Canadiens' first round opponent was the Vancouver Canucks and the Canadiens won the series in five games to advance to the semi-finals against the Buffalo Sabres. The Sabres defeated the Canadiens in six games to advance to the Stanley Cup Finals. The Sabres' checkers were able to shut down the Canadiens' top scorers, while the Canadiens' checkers were not able to contain the Sabres' French Connection line.

== Transactions ==
Following the 1975 playoffs, Henri Richard retired after 20 NHL seasons. Having been the Canadiens captain since 1971, he was succeeded in that post by Yvan Cournoyer.

== Draft picks ==
=== NHL draft ===
= NHL All-Star	= Hall of Famer

Round	Pick	Player	Nationality	College/junior/club team
1	5	Cam Connor	Canada	Flin Flon Bombers (WCHL)
1	7	Doug Risebrough	Canada	Kitchener Rangers (OMJHL)
1	10	Rick Chartraw	United States	Kitchener Rangers (OMJHL)
1	12	Mario Tremblay	Canada	Montreal Bleu Blanc Rouge (OMJHL)
1	15	Gord McTavish	Canada	Sudbury Wolves (OMJHL)
2	30	Gary MacGregor	Canada	Cornwall Royals (QMJHL)
2	33	Gilles Lupien	Canada	Montreal Bleu Blanc Rouge (QMJHL)
3	51	Marty Howe	United States	Houston Aeros (WHA)
4	61	Barry Legge	Canada	Winnipeg Clubs (WCHL)
4	69	Mike McKegney	Canada	Kitchener Rangers (OMJHL)
6	105	John Stewart	Canada	Bowling Green University (CCHA)
7	123	Joe Micheletti	United States	University of Minnesota (WCHA)
8	140	Jamie Hislop	Canada	University of New Hampshire (ECAC)
9	157	Gordon Stewart	Canada	Kamloops Chiefs (WCHL)
10	172	Chuck Luksa	Canada	Kitchener Rangers (OMJHL)
11	187	Cliff Cox	Canada	University of New Hampshire (ECAC)
12	199	Dave Lumley	Canada	University of New Hampshire (ECAC)
13	209	Mike Hobin	Canada	Hamilton Fincups (OMJHL)
