= 1974–75 Atlanta Flames season =

NHL team season

1974–75 Atlanta Flames
- Division: 4th Patrick
- Conference: 6th Campbell
- 1974–75 record: 34–31–15
- Home record: 24–9–7
- Road record: 10–22–8
- Goals for: 243
- Goals against: 233

Team information
- General manager: Cliff Fletcher
- Coach: Bernie Geoffrion; Fred Creighton
- Captain: Keith McCreary
- Alternate captains: Bob Leiter; Pat Quinn; Noel Price
- Arena: Omni Coliseum

Team leaders
- Goals: Eric Vail (39)
- Assists: Tom Lysiak (52)
- Points: Tom Lysiak (77)
- Penalty minutes: Pat Quinn (156)
- Wins: Dan Bouchard (20)
- Goals against average: Dan Bouchard (2.77)

The 1974–75 Atlanta Flames season was the third season for the franchise.

== Regular season ==
=== Final standings ===
Patrick Division
		GP	W	L	T	GF	GA	DIFF	Pts
1	Philadelphia Flyers	80	51	18	11	293	181	+112	113
2	New York Rangers	80	37	29	14	319	276	+43	88
3	New York Islanders	80	33	25	22	264	221	+43	88
4	Atlanta Flames	80	34	31	15	243	233	+10	83

=== Record vs. opponents ===
Patrick Division record vs. opponents

Vs. Campbell Conference

Vs. Wales Conference

Vs. Patrick Division

1974–75 NHL records
Team	ATL	NYI	NYR	PHI	Total
Atlanta	—	2–1–3	3–3	2–3–1	7–7–4
N.Y. Islanders	1–2–3	—	2–3–1	1–3–2	4–8–6
N.Y. Rangers	3–3	3–2–1	—	2–3–1	8–8–2
Philadelphia	3–2–1	3–1–2	3–2–1	—	9–5–4

Vs. Smythe Division

1974–75 NHL records
Team	CHI	KCS	MIN	STL	VAN	Total
Atlanta	2–3	4–0–1	3–1–1	2–3	1–2–2	12–9–4
N.Y. Islanders	1–1–3	4–1	4–0–1	2–2–1	1–2–2	12–6–7
N.Y. Rangers	3–1–1	4–0–1	4–1	3–1–1	3–2	17–5–3
Philadelphia	4–1	4–0–1	4–1	3–2	4–1	19–5–1

Vs. Adams Division

1974–75 NHL records
Team	BOS	BUF	CAL	TOR	Total
Atlanta	0–4–1	2–1–1	2–2	3–1	7–8–2
N.Y. Islanders	2–2	0–2–2	2–1–1	2–2–1	6–7–4
N.Y. Rangers	1–3	1–4	2–0–2	1–2–1	5–9–3
Philadelphia	1–2–1	3–0–1	3–2	3–0–1	10–4–3

Vs. Norris Division

1974–75 NHL records
Team	DET	LAK	MTL	PIT	WSH	Total
Atlanta	2–2	2–1–1	0–3–1	1–1–2	3–0–1	8–7–5
N.Y. Islanders	2–2	1–0–3	2–0–2	2–2	4–0	11–4–5
N.Y. Rangers	2–1–1	1–1–2	0–2–2	2–2	2–1–1	7–7–6
Philadelphia	2–1–1	2–1–1	2–1–1	3–1	4–0	13–4–3

== Schedule and results ==
1974–75 regular season
October

Game	Result	Date	Score	Opponent	Record	Attendance
1	T	October 9, 1974	3–3	@ Vancouver Canucks (1974–75)	0–0–1	15,570
2	L	October 11, 1974	0–3	@ California Golden Seals (1974–75)	0–1–1	5,426
3	W	October 13, 1974	4–3	@ Chicago Black Hawks (1974–75)	1–1–1	N/A
4	L	October 16, 1974	2–4	@ Detroit Red Wings (1974–75)	1–2–1	11,106
5	W	October 18, 1974	4–2	Kansas City Scouts (1974–75)	2–2–1	13,117
6	W	October 20, 1974	5–1	Pittsburgh Penguins (1974–75)	3–2–1	11,751
7	L	October 22, 1974	1–2	@ New York Islanders (1974–75)	3–3–1	11,254
8	W	October 23, 1974	10–1	Detroit Red Wings (1974–75)	4–3–1	12,161
9	T	October 25, 1974	2–2	Minnesota North Stars (1974–75)	4–3–2	13,411
10	L	October 27, 1974	1–4	@ New York Rangers (1974–75)	4–4–2	17,500
11	W	October 30, 1974	4–1	California Golden Seals (1974–75)	5–4–2	11,493

November

Game	Result	Date	Score	Opponent	Record	Attendance
12	W	November 1, 1974	5–2	Toronto Maple Leafs (1974–75)	6–4–2	13,205
13	L	November 2, 1974	0–9	@ St. Louis Blues (1974–75)	6–5–2	17,839
14	W	November 6, 1974	2–1	New York Islanders (1974–75)	7–5–2	12,156
15	W	November 8, 1974	2–0	Chicago Black Hawks (1974–75)	8–5–2	14,434
16	L	November 10, 1974	3–4	@ Boston Bruins (1974–75)	8–6–2	15,003
17	T	November 12, 1974	2–2	@ Washington Capitals (1974–75)	8–6–3	7,823
18	W	November 13, 1974	4–3	Washington Capitals (1974–75)	9–6–3	11,692
19	T	November 15, 1974	2–2	Philadelphia Flyers (1974–75)	9–6–4	15,141
20	L	November 17, 1974	0–4	@ Buffalo Sabres (1974–75)	9–7–4	15,863
21	W	November 20, 1974	1–0	@ Kansas City Scouts (1974–75)	10–7–4	6,455
22	T	November 22, 1974	4–4	Buffalo Sabres (1974–75)	10–7–5	14,144
23	W	November 24, 1974	4–3	@ Philadelphia Flyers (1974–75)	11–7–5	17,007
24	W	November 27, 1974	4–2	Kansas City Scouts (1974–75)	12–7–5	12,752
25	W	November 29, 1974	3–2	New York Rangers (1974–75)	13–7–5	15,141

December

Game	Result	Date	Score	Opponent	Record	Attendance
26	L	December 2, 1974	0–2	@ Montreal Canadiens (1974–75)	13–8–5	16,548
27	L	December 4, 1974	1–3	@ California Golden Seals (1974–75)	13–9–5	2,913
28	L	December 6, 1974	5–7	@ Vancouver Canucks (1974–75)	13–10–5	15,570
29	L	December 7, 1974	2–6	@ Los Angeles Kings (1974–75)	13–11–5	11,997
30	L	December 11, 1974	2–5	Chicago Black Hawks (1974–75)	13–12–5	12,629
31	L	December 13, 1974	2–3	Philadelphia Flyers (1974–75)	13–13–5	15,141
32	L	December 14, 1974	2–4	@ Toronto Maple Leafs (1974–75)	13–14–5	16,349
33	L	December 17, 1974	3–5	@ Boston Bruins (1974–75)	13–15–5	13,967
34	W	December 20, 1974	6–2	St. Louis Blues (1974–75)	14–15–5	12,717
35	W	December 22, 1974	4–3	@ New York Rangers (1974–75)	15–15–5	17,500
36	W	December 26, 1974	2–1	New York Islanders (1974–75)	16–15–5	15,141
37	T	December 28, 1974	3–3	@ Pittsburgh Penguins (1974–75)	16–15–6	10,939

January

Game	Result	Date	Score	Opponent	Record	Attendance
38	T	January 2, 1975	1–1	Montreal Canadiens (1974–75)	16–15–7	15,141
39	W	January 4, 1975	4–1	@ St. Louis Blues (1974–75)	17–15–7	19,219
40	W	January 5, 1975	3–0	Washington Capitals (1974–75)	18–15–7	12,045
41	W	January 8, 1975	3–2	California Golden Seals (1974–75)	19–15–7	12,013
42	T	January 10, 1975	3–3	Pittsburgh Penguins (1974–75)	19–15–8	13,629
43	T	January 11, 1975	2–2	@ New York Islanders (1974–75)	19–15–9	14,865
44	L	January 15, 1975	3–5	@ Pittsburgh Penguins (1974–75)	19–16–9	7,554
45	W	January 17, 1975	5–0	Los Angeles Kings (1974–75)	20–16–9	14,507
46	L	January 18, 1975	1–4	@ Philadelphia Flyers (1974–75)	20–17–9	17,007
47	L	January 23, 1975	2–5	@ New York Rangers (1974–75)	20–18–9	17,500
48	L	January 24, 1975	1–4	Vancouver Canucks (1974–75)	20–19–9	13,967
49	W	January 26, 1975	4–3	@ Buffalo Sabres (1974–75)	21–19–9	15,863
50	T	January 29, 1975	4–4	@ Kansas City Scouts (1974–75)	21–19–10	6,677
51	L	January 31, 1975	2–4	St. Louis Blues (1974–75)	21–20–10	14,107

February

Game	Result	Date	Score	Opponent	Record	Attendance
52	W	February 2, 1975	5–3	@ Minnesota North Stars (1974–75)	22–20–10	12,187
53	T	February 5, 1975	3–3	Boston Bruins (1974–75)	22–20–11	15,002
54	W	February 7, 1975	3–1	Los Angeles Kings (1974–75)	23–20–11	13,702
55	L	February 9, 1975	2–3	Minnesota North Stars (1974–75)	23–21–11	12,057
56	T	February 12, 1975	2–2	@ Los Angeles Kings (1974–75)	23–21–12	12,346
57	T	February 15, 1975	3–3	@ Vancouver Canucks (1974–75)	23–21–13	15,570
58	W	February 19, 1975	4–2	@ Minnesota North Stars (1974–75)	24–21–13	12,262
59	L	February 22, 1975	3–4	@ Detroit Red Wings (1974–75)	24–22–13	12,744
60	L	February 23, 1975	0–4	@ Chicago Black Hawks (1974–75)	24–23–13	N/A
61	W	February 26, 1975	7–4	Philadelphia Flyers (1974–75)	25–23–13	15,087
62	L	February 28, 1975	3–4	Chicago Black Hawks (1974–75)	25–24–13	15,141

March

Game	Result	Date	Score	Opponent	Record	Attendance
63	W	March 2, 1975	4–0	Kansas City Scouts (1974–75)	26–24–13	12,118
64	L	March 5, 1975	3–4	Montreal Canadiens (1974–75)	26–25–13	12,353
65	L	March 7, 1975	2–4	Boston Bruins (1974–75)	26–26–13	15,223
66	L	March 9, 1975	2–5	@ Boston Bruins (1974–75)	26–27–13	14,558
67	L	March 11, 1975	0–3	@ St. Louis Blues (1974–75)	26–28–13	17,833
68	W	March 12, 1975	9–4	Minnesota North Stars (1974–75)	27–28–13	11,324
69	W	March 14, 1975	1–0	New York Rangers (1974–75)	28–28–13	14,065
70	L	March 17, 1975	1–5	@ Montreal Canadiens (1974–75)	28–29–13	16,858
71	W	March 19, 1975	8–7	Toronto Maple Leafs (1974–75)	29–29–13	11,877
72	W	March 21, 1975	12–4	Vancouver Canucks (1974–75)	30–29–13	12,490
73	W	March 23, 1975	5–0	@ Washington Capitals (1974–75)	31–29–13	10,105
74	W	March 26, 1975	5–3	Detroit Red Wings (1974–75)	32–29–13	12,176
75	W	March 28, 1975	3–2	Buffalo Sabres (1974–75)	33–29–13	13,786
76	T	March 30, 1975	2–2	New York Islanders (1974–75)	33–29–14	14,536

April

Game	Result	Date	Score	Opponent	Record	Attendance
77	T	April 1, 1975	2–2	@ New York Islanders (1974–75)	33–29–15	14,865
78	W	April 2, 1975	3–0	@ Toronto Maple Leafs (1974–75)	34–29–15	16,422
79	L	April 4, 1975	2–3	New York Rangers (1974–75)	34–30–15	15,189
80	L	April 6, 1975	2–6	@ Philadelphia Flyers (1974–75)	34–31–15	17,007

Legend: Win (2 points) Loss (0 points) Tie (1 point)

== Player statistics ==
=== Skaters ===
Note: GP = Games played; G = Goals; A = Assists; Pts = Points; PIM = Penalty minutes

		Regular season					Playoffs
Player	#	GP	G	A	Pts	PIM	GP	G	A	Pts	PIM
Tom Lysiak	12	77	25	52	77	73	–	–	–	–	-
Curt Bennett	5	80	31	33	64	40	–	–	–	–	-
Eric Vail	25	72	39	21	60	46	–	–	–	–	-
Buster Harvey	8	79	17	27	44	16	–	–	–	–	–
Bryan Hextall	20	74	18	16	34	62	–	–	–	–	-
Rey Comeau	18	75	14	20	34	40	–	–	–	–	-
Tim Ecclestone^{†}	14	62	13	21	34	34	–	–	–	–	-
Randy Manery	7	68	5	27	32	48	–	–	–	–	-
Jacques Richard	15	63	17	12	29	31	–	–	–	–	-
Hilliard Graves	17	67	10	19	29	30	–	–	–	–	-
Bob Leiter	16	52	10	18	28	8	–	–	–	–	-
Jean Lemieux	6	75	3	24	27	19	–	–	–	–	-
Keith McCreary	9	78	11	10	21	8	–	–	–	–	-
Pat Quinn	3	80	2	19	21	156	–	–	–	–	-
Larry Romanchych	21	53	8	12	20	16	–	–	–	–	-
Noel Price	4	80	4	14	18	82	–	–	–	–	-
Barry Gibbs^{†}	2	39	3	13	16	39	–	–	–	–	-
Gerry Meehan^{†}	10	14	4	10	14	0	–	–	–	–	-
Dwight Bialowas^{‡}	22	37	3	9	12	20	–	–	–	–	-
Ed Kea	19	50	1	9	10	39	–	–	–	–	-
Bob Murray^{‡}	23	42	3	3	6	22	–	–	–	–	-
Dean Talafous^{‡}	24	18	1	4	5	13	–	–	–	–	-
Jerry Byers	10	14	1	1	2	9	–	–	–	–	-
Dan Bouchard	30	40	0	2	2	42	–	–	–	–	-
Phil Myre	1	40	0	1	1	6	–	–	–	–	-
Vic Mercredi	10	2	0	0	0	0	–	–	–	–	-
Guy Chouinard	10	5	0	0	0	2	–	–	–	–	-

^{†}Denotes player spent time with another team before joining Atlanta. Stats reflect time with the Flames only.
^{‡}Traded mid-season

=== Goaltending ===
Note: GP = Games played; TOI = Time on ice (minutes); W = Wins; L = Losses; OT = Overtime/shootout losses; GA = Goals against; SO = Shutouts; GAA = Goals against average

		Regular season								Playoffs
Player	#	GP	TOI	W	L	T	GA	SO	GAA	GP	TOI	W	L	GA	SO	GAA
Dan Bouchard	30	40	2400	20	15	5	111	3	2.77	–	–	–	–	–	–	-
Phil Myre	1	40	2400	14	16	10	114	5	2.85	–	–	–	–	–	–	-

== Transactions ==
The Flames were involved in the following transactions during the 1974–75 season.

=== Trades ===
May 28, 1974	To Atlanta Flames ----Jerry Byers; Buster Harvey	To Minnesota North Stars ----John Flesch; Don Martineau
June 20, 1974	To Atlanta Flames ----Cash	To Washington Capitals ----Doug Mohns
July 18, 1974	To Atlanta Flames ----Hilliard Graves	To California Golden Seals ----John Stewart
October 4, 1974	To Atlanta Flames ----Cash	To Vancouver Canucks ----Leon Rochefort
January 3, 1975	To Atlanta Flames ----Barry Gibbs	To Minnesota North Stars ----Dwight Bialowas; Dean Talafous
March 9, 1975	To Atlanta Flames ----Gerry Meehan	To Vancouver Canucks ----Bob Murray

=== Free agents ===
Player / Former team	Player / New team

=== Expansion draft ===
#	Player	Selected by
7.	Butch Deadmarsh (LW)	Kansas City Scouts
33.	Kerry Ketter (D)	Kansas City Scouts
38.	Lew Morrison (RW)	Washington Capitals

== Draft picks ==
Round	Pick	Player	Nationality	College/Junior/Club team
2	28.	Guy Chouinard (C)	Canada	Quebec Remparts (QMJHL)
3	46.	Dick Spannbauer (D)	United States	University of Minnesota (NCAA)
4	58.	Pat Ribble (D)	Canada	Oshawa Generals (OHA)
4	64.	Cam Botting (RW)	Canada	Niagara Falls Flyers (SOJHL)
5	82.	Jerry Badiuk (D)	Canada	Kitchener Rangers (OHA)
6	100.	Bill Moen (G)	United States	University of Minnesota Duluth (NCAA)
7	118.	Peter Brown (D)	United States	Boston University (NCAA)
8	135.	Tom Lindskog (D)	Canada	University of Michigan (NCAA)
9	152.	Larry Hopkins (LW)	Canada	University of Toronto (CIAU)
10	167.	Louis Loranger (C)	Canada	Shawinigan Dynamos (QMJHL)
11	182.	Randy Montgomery (LW)	Canada	Welland Sabres (SOJHL)
