= Earl Anderson (ice hockey) =

American ice hockey player (born 1951)

- Born: February 24, 1951 (age 74) Roseau, Minnesota, U.S.
- Height: 6 ft 1 in (185 cm)
- Weight: 185 lb (84 kg; 13 st 3 lb)
- Position: Right wing
- Shot: Right
- Played for: Detroit Red Wings; Boston Bruins
- National team: United States
- NHL draft: 58th overall, 1971; Detroit Red Wings
- Playing career: 1974–1978

Earl Orlin Anderson (born February 24, 1951) is an American former professional ice hockey player who played 109 regular games in the National Hockey League for the Boston Bruins and Detroit Red Wings between 1973 and 1977. His career was cut short by injuries. Anderson was also a member of the American national team at the 1973 World Championship Pool B, which was held in Austria.

== Career statistics ==
=== Regular season and playoffs ===
			Regular season					Playoffs
Season	Team	League	GP	G	A	Pts	PIM	GP	G	A	Pts	PIM
1967–68	Roseau High School	HS-MN	—	—	—	—	—	—	—	—	—	—
1969–70	University of North Dakota	WCHA	30	17	7	24	0	—	—	—	—	—
1970–71	University of North Dakota	WCHA	32	12	17	29	22	—	—	—	—	—
1971–72	University of North Dakota	WCHA	36	23	22	45	24	—	—	—	—	—
1972–73	University of North Dakota	WCHA	36	17	30	47	12	—	—	—	—	—
1973–74	London Lions	Exhib	70	62	48	110	41	—	—	—	—	—
1974–75	Detroit Red Wings	NHL	45	7	3	10	12	—	—	—	—	—
1974–75	Virginia Wings	AHL	4	0	3	3	2	—	—	—	—	—
1974–75	Boston Bruins	NHL	19	2	4	6	4	3	0	1	1	0
1975–76	Boston Bruins	NHL	5	0	1	1	2	—	—	—	—	—
1976–77	Boston Bruins	NHL	40	10	11	21	4	2	0	0	0	0
1976–77	Rochester Americans	AHL	32	19	14	33	16	—	—	—	—	—
1977–78	Rochester Americans	AHL	72	26	40	66	22	6	1	2	3	2
NHL totals			109	19	19	38	22	5	0	1	1	0

=== International ===
Year	Team	Event	GP	G	A	Pts	PIM
1973	United States	WC-B	7	8	4	12	—
Senior totals			7	8	4	12	—
