= 1974–75 New York Rangers season =

NHL hockey team season

1974–75 New York Rangers
- Division: 2nd Patrick
- Conference: 2nd Campbell
- 1974–75 record: 37–29–14
- Home record: 21–11–8
- Road record: 16–18–6
- Goals for: 319
- Goals against: 276

Team information
- General manager: Emile Francis
- Coach: Emile Francis
- Captain: Brad Park
- Arena: Madison Square Garden

Team leaders
- Goals: Steve Vickers (41)
- Assists: Rod Gilbert (61)
- Points: Rod Gilbert (97)
- Penalty minutes: Derek Sanderson (106)
- Wins: Gilles Villemure (22)
- Goals against average: Gilles Villemure (3.16)

The 1974–75 New York Rangers season was the franchise's 49th season. A league realignment had the Rangers moved into the new Patrick Division within the Campbell Conference, where the team finished 2nd with 88 points. They qualified for the playoffs, losing in the preliminary round to the New York Islanders 2–1 in a best of three games series.

== Regular season ==
=== Final standings ===
Patrick Division
		GP	W	L	T	GF	GA	DIFF	Pts
1	Philadelphia Flyers	80	51	18	11	293	181	+112	113
2	New York Rangers	80	37	29	14	319	276	+43	88
3	New York Islanders	80	33	25	22	264	221	+43	88
4	Atlanta Flames	80	34	31	15	243	233	+10	83

=== Record vs. opponents ===
Patrick Division record vs. opponents

Vs. Campbell Conference

Vs. Wales Conference

Vs. Patrick Division

1974–75 NHL records
Team	ATL	NYI	NYR	PHI	Total
Atlanta	—	2–1–3	3–3	2–3–1	7–7–4
N.Y. Islanders	1–2–3	—	2–3–1	1–3–2	4–8–6
N.Y. Rangers	3–3	3–2–1	—	2–3–1	8–8–2
Philadelphia	3–2–1	3–1–2	3–2–1	—	9–5–4

Vs. Smythe Division

1974–75 NHL records
Team	CHI	KCS	MIN	STL	VAN	Total
Atlanta	2–3	4–0–1	3–1–1	2–3	1–2–2	12–9–4
N.Y. Islanders	1–1–3	4–1	4–0–1	2–2–1	1–2–2	12–6–7
N.Y. Rangers	3–1–1	4–0–1	4–1	3–1–1	3–2	17–5–3
Philadelphia	4–1	4–0–1	4–1	3–2	4–1	19–5–1

Vs. Adams Division

1974–75 NHL records
Team	BOS	BUF	CAL	TOR	Total
Atlanta	0–4–1	2–1–1	2–2	3–1	7–8–2
N.Y. Islanders	2–2	0–2–2	2–1–1	2–2–1	6–7–4
N.Y. Rangers	1–3	1–4	2–0–2	1–2–1	5–9–3
Philadelphia	1–2–1	3–0–1	3–2	3–0–1	10–4–3

Vs. Norris Division

1974–75 NHL records
Team	DET	LAK	MTL	PIT	WSH	Total
Atlanta	2–2	2–1–1	0–3–1	1–1–2	3–0–1	8–7–5
N.Y. Islanders	2–2	1–0–3	2–0–2	2–2	4–0	11–4–5
N.Y. Rangers	2–1–1	1–1–2	0–2–2	2–2	2–1–1	7–7–6
Philadelphia	2–1–1	2–1–1	2–1–1	3–1	4–0	13–4–3

== Schedule and results ==
1974–75 regular season
October: 5–3–2 (home: 3–1–2; road: 2–2–0)

Game	October	Opponent	Score	Record
1	9	Washington Capitals	6–3	1–0–0
2	12	@ Toronto Maple Leafs	7–3	1–1–0
3	16	California Golden Seals	5–5	1–1–1
4	19	@ New York Islanders	4–2	2–1–1
5	20	Vancouver Canucks	1–0	2–2–1
6	23	St. Louis Blues	5–1	3–2–1
7	26	@ Pittsburgh Penguins	5–4	4–2–1
8	27	Atlanta Flames	4–1	5–2–1
9	30	New York Islanders	1–1	5–2–2
10	31	@ Philadelphia Flyers	5–1	5–3–2

November: 5–5–2 (home: 3–3–0; road: 2–2–2)

Game	November	Opponent	Score	Record
11	3	Buffalo Sabres	4–3	5–4–2
12	5	@ Vancouver Canucks	2–1	5–5–2
13	6	@ California Golden Seals	7–3	6–5–2
14	9	@ Los Angeles Kings	2–2	6–5–3
15	13	Philadelphia Flyers	3–2	6–6–3
16	16	@ Montreal Canadiens	4–4	6–6–4
17	17	California Golden Seals	10–0	7–6–4
18	20	@ Detroit Red Wings	5–4	8–6–4
19	23	Boston Bruins	5–2	8–7–4
20	24	Pittsburgh Penguins	7–5	9–7–4
21	27	Toronto Maple Leafs	4–1	10–7–4
22	29	@ Atlanta Flames	3–2	10–8–4

December: 6–3–4 (home: 4–1–3; road: 2–2–1)

Game	December	Opponent	Score	Record
23	1	St. Louis Blues	4–4	10–8–5
24	4	Detroit Red Wings	4–2	11–8–5
25	7	@ Chicago Black Hawks	7–4	12–8–5
26	8	Montreal Canadiens	3–3	12–8–6
27	12	@ Washington Capitals	6–6	12–8–7
28	14	@ St. Louis Blues	6–2	12–9–7
29	15	Los Angeles Kings	3–3	12–9–8
30	18	Minnesota North Stars	7–0	13–9–8
31	19	@ Boston Bruins	11–3	13–10–8
32	22	Atlanta Flames	4–3	13–11–8
33	27	Buffalo Sabres	9–5	14–11–8
34	29	Kansas City Scouts	2–1	15–11–8
35	30	@ Minnesota North Stars	8–1	16–11–8

January: 9–4–1 (home: 4–0–0; road: 5–4–1)

Game	January	Opponent	Score	Record
36	1	Chicago Black Hawks	6–2	17–11–8
37	4	@ New York Islanders	5–3	18–11–8
38	5	Vancouver Canucks	6–2	19–11–8
39	8	@ Kansas City Scouts	6–1	20–11–8
40	11	@ St. Louis Blues	5–3	21–11–8
41	12	@ Chicago Black Hawks	4–2	21–12–8
42	15	@ Minnesota North Stars	5–3	22–12–8
43	17	@ California Golden Seals	4–4	22–12–9
44	18	@ Vancouver Canucks	3–2	23–12–9
45	23	Atlanta Flames	5–2	24–12–9
46	25	@ Pittsburgh Penguins	5–2	24–13–9
47	26	Los Angeles Kings	3–2	25–13–9
48	28	@ Los Angeles Kings	5–2	25–14–9
49	30	@ Buffalo Sabres	6–3	25–15–9

February: 6–4–4 (home: 3–1–3; road: 3–3–1)

Game	February	Opponent	Score	Record
50	1	@ Chicago Black Hawks	4–1	26–15–9
51	2	Detroit Red Wings	5–5	26–15–10
52	5	Philadelphia Flyers	4–3	26–16–10
53	6	@ Philadelphia Flyers	3–1	27–16–10
54	8	@ Montreal Canadiens	7–1	27–17–10
55	9	Washington Capitals	7–3	28–17–10
56	11	@ Washington Capitals	7–4	28–18–10
57	15	@ Minnesota North Stars	9–2	29–18–10
58	16	Toronto Maple Leafs	5–5	29–18–11
59	18	@ Kansas City Scouts	2–2	29–18–12
60	19	Chicago Black Hawks	2–2	29–18–13
61	22	@ Toronto Maple Leafs	5–2	29–19–13
62	23	Philadelphia Flyers	2–1	30–19–13
63	26	St. Louis Blues	5–1	31–19–13

March: 5–9–0 (home: 4–4–0; road: 1–5–0)

Game	March	Opponent	Score	Record
64	2	Pittsburgh Penguins	8–6	31–20–13
65	5	Buffalo Sabres	6–3	31–21–13
66	7	@ Kansas City Scouts	5–2	32–21–13
67	9	Montreal Canadiens	5–3	32–22–13
68	11	@ Boston Bruins	6–3	32–23–13
69	12	New York Islanders	5–3	33–23–13
70	14	@ Atlanta Flames	1–0	33–24–13
71	19	Vancouver Canucks	3–0	34–24–13
72	20	@ Buffalo Sabres	6–3	34–25–13
73	22	@ Detroit Red Wings	7–4	34–26–13
74	23	Boston Bruins	7–5	35–26–13
75	26	Minnesota North Stars	4–2	35–27–13
76	29	@ New York Islanders	6–4	35–28–13
77	30	Kansas City Scouts	8–2	36–28–13

April: 1–1–1 (home: 0–1–0; road: 1–0–1)

Game	April	Opponent	Score	Record
78	3	@ Philadelphia Flyers	1–1	36–28–14
79	4	@ Atlanta Flames	3–2	37–28–14
80	6	New York Islanders	6–4	37–29–14

Legend: Win (2 points) Loss (0 points) Tie (1 point)

== Playoffs ==
1975 Stanley Cup playoffs
Preliminary round vs. (8) New York Islanders – Islanders win 2–1

Game	Date	Visitor	Score	Home	OT	Series
1	April 8	New York Islanders	3–2	New York Rangers		New York Islanders lead series 1–0
2	April 10	New York Rangers	8–3	New York Islanders		Series tied 1–1
3	April 11	New York Islanders	4–3	New York Rangers	OT	New York Islanders win series 2–1

Legend: Win Loss

== Player statistics ==
Skaters

Regular season
Player	GP	G	A	Pts	PIM
Rod Gilbert	76	36	61	97	22
Jean Ratelle	79	36	55	91	26
Steve Vickers	80	41	48	89	64
Bill Fairbairn	80	24	37	61	10
Pete Stemkowski	77	24	35	59	63
Brad Park	65	13	44	57	104
Derek Sanderson	75	25	25	50	106
Ron Greschner	70	8	37	45	93
Greg Polis	76	26	15	41	55
Rick Middleton	47	22	18	40	19
Walt Tkaczuk	62	11	25	36	34
Gilles Marotte	77	4	32	36	69
Ted Irvine	79	17	17	34	66
Jerry Butler	78	17	16	33	102
Nick Beverley	67	3	15	18	19
John Bednarski	35	1	10	11	37
Dale Rolfe	42	1	8	9	30
Ron Harris	34	1	7	8	22
Bert Wilson	61	5	1	6	66
Bobby Rousseau	8	2	2	4	0
Bob MacMillan	22	1	2	3	4
Dave Maloney	4	0	2	2	0
Joe Zanussi	8	0	2	2	4
Jerry Holland	1	1	0	1	0
Rod Seiling^{‡}	4	0	1	1	0
Hartland Monahan	6	0	1	1	4

Playoffs
Player	GP	G	A	Pts	PIM
Steve Vickers	3	2	4	6	6
Jean Ratelle	3	1	5	6	2
Brad Park	3	1	4	5	2
Bill Fairbairn	3	4	0	4	13
Rod Gilbert	3	1	3	4	2
Walt Tkaczuk	3	1	2	3	5
Ron Harris	3	1	0	1	9
Nick Beverley	3	0	1	1	0
Jerry Butler	3	1	0	1	16
Ted Irvine	3	0	1	1	11
Gilles Marotte	3	0	1	1	4
Ron Greschner	3	0	1	1	2
Pete Stemkowski	3	1	0	1	10
John Bednarski	1	0	0	0	17
Rick Middleton	3	0	0	0	2
Greg Polis	3	0	0	0	6
Derek Sanderson	3	0	0	0	0

Goaltenders

Regular season
Player	GP	TOI	W	L	T	GA	GAA	SO
Gilles Villemure	45	2470	22	14	6	130	3.16	2
Ed Giacomin	37	2069	13	12	8	120	3.48	1
Dunc Wilson^{†}	3	180	1	2	0	13	4.33	0
Curt Ridley	2	81	1	1	0	7	5.19	0

Playoffs
Player	GP	TOI	W	L	GA	GAA	SO
Gilles Villemure	2	94	1	0	6	3.83	0
Ed Giacomin	2	86	0	2	4	2.79	0

^{†}Denotes player spent time with another team before joining Rangers. Stats reflect time with Rangers only.
^{‡}Traded mid-season. Stats reflect time with Rangers only.

Note:

Pos = Position;GP = Games played; G = Goals; A = Assists; Pts = Points; PIM = Penalty minutes; +/- = Plus/minus; PPG = Power-play goals; SHG = Short-handed goals; GWG = Game-winning goals
Pos = Position;GP = Games played; Min, TOI = Minutes played; W = Wins; L = Losses; T,T/OT = Ties; OTL = Overtime losses; GA = Goals-against; GAA = Goals-against average; SO = Shutouts; SA = Shots against; SV = Shots saved;SV% = Save percentage;

== Draft picks ==
New York's picks at the 1974 NHL amateur draft in Montreal, Canada.

Round	#	Player	Position	Nationality	College/Junior/Club team (League)
1	14	Dave Maloney	D	Canada	Kitchener Rangers (OHA)
2	32	Ron Greschner	D	Canada	New Westminster Bruins (WCHL)
3	50	Jerry Holland	LW	Canada	Calgary Centennials (WCHL)
4	68	Boyd Anderson	D	Canada	Medicine Hat Tigers (WCHL)
5	86	Dennis Olmstead	C	Canada	University of Wisconsin (NCAA)
6	104	Eddie Johnstone	RW	Canada	Medicine Hat Tigers (WCHL)
7	122	John Memryk	G	Canada	Winnipeg Clubs (WCHL)
8	139	Greg Holst	C	Canada	Kingston Canadians (OHA)
9	156	Claude Arvisais	C	Canada	Shawinigan Dynamos (QMJHL)
10	171	Ken Dodd	LW	Canada	New Westminster Bruins (WCHL)
11	186	Ralph Krentz	LW	Canada	Brandon Wheat Kings (WCHL)
12	198	Larry Jacques	RW	Canada	Ottawa 67's (OHA)
13	208	Tom Gastle	LW	Canada	Peterborough Petes (OHA)
14	218	Eric Brubacher	C	Canada	Kingston Canadians (OHA)
15	224	Russ Hall	RW	Canada	Winnipeg Clubs (WCHL)
16	227	Bill Kriski	G	Canada	Winnipeg Clubs (WCHL)
17	230	Kevin Treacy	RW	Canada	Cornwall Royals (QMJHL)
18	233	Ken Gassoff	C	Canada	Medicine Hat Tigers (WCHL)
19	236	Cliff Bast	D	Canada	Medicine Hat Tigers (WCHL)
20	239	Jim Mayer	RW	Canada	Michigan Tech (NCAA)
21	241	Warren Miller	RW	United States	University of Minnesota (NCAA)
22	243	Kevin Walker	D	Canada	Cornell University (WCHL)
23	245	Jim Warner	RW	United States	Minnesota Junior Stars (MidJHL)

== See also ==
- 1974–75 NHL season
