= Jim Clarke (ice hockey) =

Canadian ice hockey player

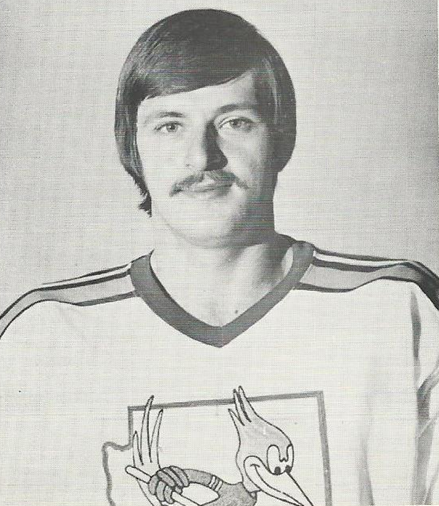
- Born: August 11, 1954 (age 71) Toronto, Ontario, Canada
- Height: 6 ft 3 in (191 cm)
- Weight: 215 lb (98 kg; 15 st 5 lb)
- Position: Defence
- Shot: Left
- Played for: WHA; Phoenix Roadrunners
- NHL draft: 113th overall, 1974; Vancouver Canucks
- WHA draft: 31st overall, 1974; Phoenix Roadrunners
- Playing career: 1974–1977

Jim Clarke (born August 11, 1954) is a Canadian former professional ice hockey defenceman. Clarke played the 1975–76 season with the Phoenix Roadrunners of the World Hockey Association (WHA). As a youth, he played in the 1967 Quebec International Pee-Wee Hockey Tournament with the Toronto Faustina minor ice hockey team.

== Career statistics ==
			Regular season					Playoffs
Season	Team	League	GP	G	A	Pts	PIM	GP	G	A	Pts	PIM
1971–72	Toronto Marlboros	OHA-Jr.	4	0	1	1	0	—	—	—	—	—
1971–72	Markham Waxers	MetJBHL	—	—	—	—	—	—	—	—	—	—
1972–73	Toronto Marlboros	OHA-Jr.	59	6	18	24	149	—	—	—	—	—
1973–74	Toronto Marlboros	OHA-Jr.	61	10	26	36	135	—	—	—	—	—
1974–75	Tulsa Oilers	CHL	67	3	8	11	74	2	0	0	0	6
1975–76	Phoenix Roadrunners	WHA	59	1	9	10	57	—	—	—	—	—
1975–76	Tucson Mavericks	CHL	3	0	0	0	0	—	—	—	—	—
1976–77	Beauce Jaros	NAHL-Sr.	1	0	0	0	0	—	—	—	—	—
WHA totals			59	1	9	10	57	—	—	—	—	—
CHL totals			70	3	8	11	74	2	0	0	0	6
