= Mike Hobin =

Canadian ice hockey player

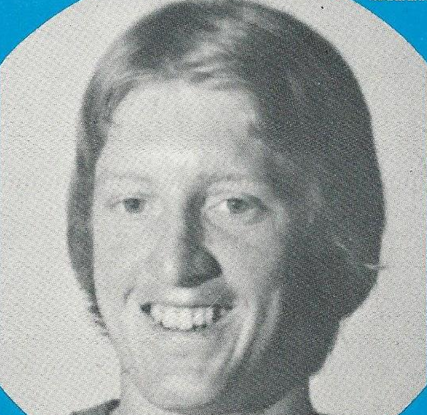
- Hobin in 1976 photo
- Born: February 21, 1954 (age 72) Sarnia, Ontario, Canada
- Height: 5 ft 11 in (180 cm)
- Weight: 180 lb (82 kg; 12 st 12 lb)
- Position: Centre
- Shot: Left
- Played for: Phoenix Roadrunners
- NHL draft: 209th overall, 1974; Montreal Canadiens
- WHA draft: 94th overall, 1974; Vancouver Blazers
- Playing career: 1974–1980

Michael Patrick Hobin (born February 21, 1954) is a Canadian former professional ice hockey player who played in the World Hockey Association (WHA). Drafted in the thirteenth round of the 1974 NHL amateur draft by the Montreal Canadiens, Hobin opted to play in the WHA after being selected by the Vancouver Blazers in the seventh round of the 1974 WHA Amateur Draft. He played parts of two WHA seasons for the Phoenix Roadrunners.

== Career statistics ==
| | | | Regular season | | | | | Playoffs |
| Season | Team | League | GP | G | A | Pts | PIM | GP | G | A | Pts | PIM |
|---|---|---|---|---|---|---|---|---|---|---|---|---|
| 1972–73 | Hamilton Red Wings | OHA-Jr. | 42 | 19 | 22 | 41 | 7 | — | — | — | — | — |
| 1973–74 | Hamilton Red Wings | OHA-Jr. | 60 | 28 | 40 | 68 | 32 | — | — | — | — | — |
| 1974–75 | Charlotte Checkers | SHL-Sr. | 37 | 21 | 52 | 73 | 39 | — | — | — | — | — |
| 1974–75 | Tulsa Oilers | CHL | 36 | 10 | 18 | 28 | 14 | — | — | — | — | — |
| 1975–76 | Tucson Mavericks | CHL | 66 | 27 | 39 | 66 | 31 | — | — | — | — | — |
| 1975–76 | Phoenix Roadrunners | WHA | 9 | 1 | 1 | 2 | 2 | — | — | — | — | — |
| 1976–77 | Phoenix Roadrunners | WHA | 68 | 17 | 18 | 35 | 14 | — | — | — | — | — |
| 1976–77 | Oklahoma City Blazers | CHL | 11 | 3 | 8 | 11 | 2 | — | — | — | — | — |
| 1977–78 | Nova Scotia Voyageurs | AHL | 74 | 20 | 27 | 47 | 14 | — | — | — | — | — |
| 1978–79 | Villacher SV | Austria | 32 | 46 | 30 | 76 | — | — | — | — | — | — |
| 1979–80 | Villacher SV | Austria | 34 | 44 | 51 | 95 | 33 | — | — | — | — | — |
| 1980–81 | ATSE Graz | Austria2 | — | — | — | — | — | — | — | — | — | — |
| WHA totals | | | 77 | 18 | 19 | 37 | 16 | — | — | — | — | — |
| AHL totals | | | 74 | 20 | 27 | 47 | 14 | — | — | — | — | — |
| CHL totals | | | 113 | 40 | 65 | 105 | 47 | — | — | — | — | — |

== Awards ==
- 1974–75 SHL Rookie of the Year
