= Don McLean (ice hockey, born 1954) =

Canadian ice hockey player

- Born: January 19, 1954 (age 71); Niagara Falls, Ontario, Canada
- Height: 6 ft 1 in (185 cm)
- Weight: 200 lb (91 kg; 14 st 4 lb)
- Position: Defence
- Shot: Right
- Played for: Washington Capitals
- NHL draft: 35th overall, 1974; Philadelphia Flyers
- WHA draft: 101st overall, 1974; New England Whalers
- Playing career: 1974–1977

Robert Donald McLean (born January 19, 1954) is a Canadian former professional ice hockey defenceman. He played nine games in the National Hockey League (NHL) with the Washington Capitals during the 1975–76 season. The rest of his career, which lasted from 1974 to 1977, was spent in the minor leagues.

== Career ==
McLean was drafted by the Philadelphia Flyers at the 1974 NHL amateur draft and the New England Whalers at the 1974 WHA Amateur Draft. He played nine games in the National Hockey League (NHL) with the Washington Capitals during the 1975–76 season.

== Career statistics ==
=== Regular season and playoffs ===
			Regular season					Playoffs
Season	Team	League	GP	G	A	Pts	PIM	GP	G	A	Pts	PIM
1968–69	Niagara Falls Canucks	OHA-B	—	—	—	—	—	—	—	—	—	—
1968–69	Niagara Falls Flyers	OHA	1	0	1	1	2	—	—	—	—	—
1969–70	Niagara Falls Canucks	OHA-B	—	—	—	—	—	—	—	—	—	—
1969–70	Niagara Falls Flyers	OHA	29	0	0	0	58	—	—	—	—	—
1970–71	Niagara Falls Flyers	OHA	54	1	6	7	72	—	—	—	—	—
1971–72	Niagara Falls Flyers	OHA	34	0	5	5	10	—	—	—	—	—
1971–72	Welland Sabres	SOJHL	16	7	8	15	69	—	—	—	—	—
1972–73	Sudbury Wolves	OHA	46	5	12	17	124	—	—	—	—	—
1973–74	Sudbury Wolves	OHA	57	6	17	23	305	—	—	—	—	—
1974–75	Richmond Robins	AHL	58	1	8	9	188	4	0	1	1	2
1975–76	Washington Capitals	NHL	9	0	0	0	6	—	—	—	—	—
1975–76	Richmond Robins	AHL	20	0	0	0	16	—	—	—	—	—
1975–76	Salt Lake Golden Eagles	CHL	34	1	12	13	77	3	0	0	0	2
1976–77	Johnstown Jets	NAHL	5	0	3	3	4	—	—	—	—	—
NHL totals			9	0	0	0	6	—	—	—	—	—
