= Paul Touzin =

Canadian ice hockey player

- Born: May 19, 1954 (age 70); Quebec, Canada
- Height: 5 ft 11 in (180 cm)
- Weight: 160 lb (73 kg; 11 st 6 lb)
- Position: Goaltender
- Caught: Left
- Played for: Shawinigan Bruins (QMJHL )
- NHL draft: 149th overall, 1974; St. Louis Blues
- WHA draft: 108th overall, 1974; Michigan Stags
- Playing career: 1971–1974

Paul-Andre Touzin (born May 19, 1954) is a Canadian former ice hockey goaltender. He was selected by the St. Louis Blues in the 9th round (149th overall) of the 1974 NHL amateur draft, and was also drafted by the Michigan Stags in the 8th round (108th overall) of the 1974 WHA Amateur Draft.

== Awards and honours ==
Award	Year
QMJHL First All-Star Team	1972–73
