= Charles Constantin (ice hockey) =

Canadian ice hockey player

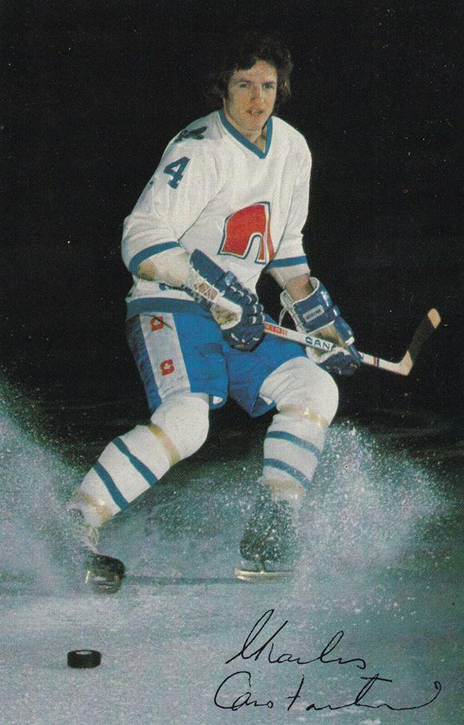
- Born: April 30, 1954 (age 71) Montreal, Quebec, Canada
- Height: 6 ft 2 in (188 cm)
- Weight: 190 lb (86 kg; 13 st 8 lb)
- Position: Left winger
- Shot: Left
- Played for: Quebec Nordiques (WHA); Indianapolis Racers (WHA)
- NHL draft: 136th overall, 1974; Buffalo Sabres
- WHA draft: 24th overall, 1974; Quebec Nordiques
- Playing career: 1974–1978

Charles Constantin (born April 30, 1954) is a Canadian former professional ice hockey left winger.

== Early life ==
Constantin was born in Montreal, Quebec. He played junior hockey with the Quebec Remparts.

== Career ==
Constantin was drafted by the Quebec Nordiques in the second round, 24th overall, of the 1974 WHA Amateur Draft. He was also drafted by the Buffalo Sabres of the National Hockey League, through he never played in the league.

He played 192 games in the World Hockey Association, 186 with the Nordiques and six with the Indianapolis Racers. He scored 28 goals and 35 assists.

== Career statistics ==
			Regular season					Playoffs
Season	Team	League	GP	G	A	Pts	PIM	GP	G	A	Pts	PIM
1970–71	Quebec Remparts	QMJHL	17	0	0	0	2	—	—	—	—	—
1971–72	Quebec Remparts	QMJHL	61	16	22	38	101	15	3	13	16	22
1972–73	Quebec Remparts	QMJHL	64	15	30	45	82	15	1	4	5	18
1973–74	Quebec Remparts	QMJHL	69	16	35	51	65	16	7	14	21	38
1974–75	Maine Nordiques	NAHL-Sr.	49	13	11	24	42	—	—	—	—	—
1974–75	Quebec Nordiques	WHA	20	2	4	6	9	—	—	—	—	—
1975–76	Maine Nordiques	NAHL-Sr.	8	1	1	2	40	—	—	—	—	—
1975–76	Quebec Nordiques	WHA	41	8	7	15	77	5	0	1	1	4
1976–77	Quebec Nordiques	WHA	77	14	19	33	93	15	0	1	1	15
1977–78	Quebec Nordiques	WHA	48	2	4	6	50	—	—	—	—	—
1977–78	Indianapolis Racers	WHA	6	2	1	3	0	—	—	—	—	—
WHA totals			192	28	35	63	229	20	0	2	2	19
