= Alain Daigle =

Canadian ice hockey player

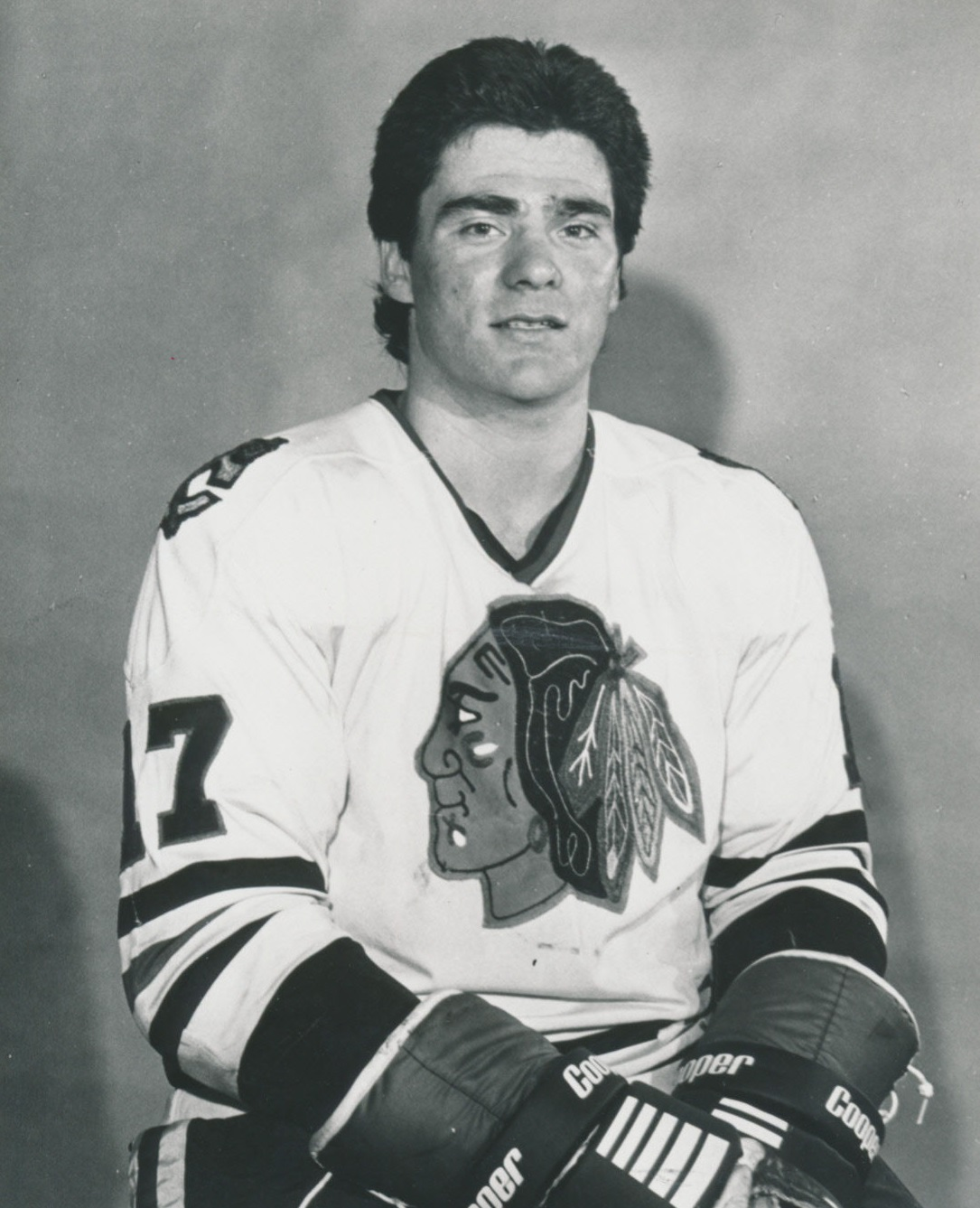
- Daigle in 1978
- Born: August 24, 1954 (age 71) Trois-Rivières, Quebec, Canada
- Height: 5 ft 10 in (178 cm)
- Weight: 180 lb (82 kg; 12 st 12 lb)
- Position: Right wing
- Shot: Right
- Played for: Chicago Black Hawks
- NHL draft: 34th overall, 1974; Chicago Black Hawks
- WHA draft: 38th overall, 1974; Quebec Nordiques
- Playing career: 1974–1984

Roland Alain Daigle (born August 24, 1954) is a Canadian former professional ice hockey forward who played six seasons with the Chicago Black Hawks of the National Hockey League from 1974–75 to 1979–80.

As a youth, Daigle played in the 1966 and 1967 Quebec International Pee-Wee Hockey Tournaments with a minor ice hockey team from Cap-de-la-Madeleine. Daigle was drafted 34th overall by the Blackhawks in the 1974 NHL amateur draft. He played 389 career NHL games, scoring 56 goals and 50 assists for 106 points.

== Career statistics ==
=== Regular season and playoffs ===
			Regular season					Playoffs
Season	Team	League	GP	G	A	Pts	PIM	GP	G	A	Pts	PIM
1969–70	Trois-Rivieres Ducs	QMJHL	26	5	3	8	13	—	—	—	—	—
1970–71	Trois-Rivieres Ducs	QMJHL	62	28	34	62	66	11	2	5	7	10
1971–72	Trois-Rivieres Ducs	QMJHL	60	30	31	61	166	2	1	0	1	20
1972–73	Trois-Rivieres Ducs	QMJHL	61	42	32	74	97	4	0	2	2	0
1973–74	Trois-Rivieres Draveurs	QMJHL	67	80	68	148	72	4	5	3	8	0
1974–75	Chicago Black Hawks	NHL	52	5	4	9	6	2	0	0	0	0
1975–76	Chicago Black Hawks	NHL	71	15	9	24	15	4	0	0	0	0
1976–77	Chicago Black Hawks	NHL	73	12	8	20	11	1	0	0	0	0
1977–78	Chicago Black Hawks	NHL	53	6	6	12	13	4	0	1	1	0
1978–79	Chicago Black Hawks	NHL	74	11	14	25	55	4	0	0	0	0
1978–79	New Brunswick Hawks	AHL	5	2	2	4	4	—	—	—	—	—
1979–80	Chicago Black Hawks	NHL	66	7	9	16	22	2	0	0	0	0
1980–81	Gap	FRA	28	22	13	35	—	—	—	—	—	—
1980–81	New Brunswick Hawks	AHL	15	5	5	10	14	7	1	1	2	7
1981–82	ECS Innsbruck	AUT	24	32	19	51	62	—	—	—	—	—
1982–83	Sherbrooke Jets	AHL	43	11	22	33	18	—	—	—	—	—
1983–84	Sherbrooke Jets	AHL	79	22	26	48	24	—	—	—	—	—
NHL totals			389	56	50	106	122	17	0	1	1	0
