= Gordon Buynak =

American ice hockey player

- Born: March 19, 1954 (age 71); Detroit, Michigan, U.S.
- Height: 6 ft 1 in (185 cm)
- Weight: 181 lb (82 kg; 12 st 13 lb)
- Position: Defense
- Shot: Left
- Played for: St. Louis Blues
- NHL draft: 43rd overall, 1974; St. Louis Blues
- WHA draft: 61st overall, 1974; Phoenix Roadrunners
- Playing career: 1974–1980

Gordon "Gord" Buynak (born March 19, 1954, in Detroit, Michigan) is a retired American ice hockey defenseman. He played for the St. Louis Blues of the National Hockey League (NHL). As a youth, he played in the 1966 Quebec International Pee-Wee Hockey Tournament with the Detroit Roostertail minor ice hockey team.

== Career statistics ==
			Regular season					Playoffs
Season	Team	League	GP	G	A	Pts	PIM	GP	G	A	Pts	PIM
1971–72	Detroit Jr. Red Wings	SOJHL	53	2	17	19	132	—	—	—	—	—
1972–73	Detroit Jr. Red Wings	SOJHL	57	10	14	24	150	—	—	—	—	—
1973–74	Kingston Canadians	OHL	70	9	35	44	187	—	—	—	—	—
1974–75	St. Louis Blues	NHL	4	0	0	0	2	—	—	—	—	—
1974–75	Denver Spurs	CHL	56	1	16	17	102	2	0	1	1	2
1975–76	Providence Reds	AHL	70	3	14	17	79	3	0	0	0	4
1976–77	Kansas City Blues	CHL	43	0	11	11	34	—	—	—	—	—
1976–77	Salt Lake Golden Eagles	CHL	20	2	6	8	10	—	—	—	—	—
1977–78	Salt Lake Golden Eagles	CHL	65	1	9	10	76	6	0	0	0	8
1978–79	Tulsa Oilers	CHL	72	4	12	16	88	—	—	—	—	—
1979–80	Dallas Black Hawks	CHL	42	2	6	8	33	—	—	—	—	—
1979–80	Salt Lake Golden Eagles	CHL	16	0	4	4	25	6	0	1	1	0
NHL totals			4	0	0	0	2	—	—	—	—	—
CHL totals			314	10	64	74	368	14	0	2	2	10
