= Rich Nantais =

Canadian ice hockey player

- Born: October 27, 1954 (age 70); Repentigny, Quebec, Canada
- Height: 5 ft 11 in (180 cm)
- Weight: 190 lb (86 kg; 13 st 8 lb)
- Position: Left wing
- Shot: Left
- Played for: Minnesota North Stars
- NHL draft: 24th overall, 1974; Minnesota North Stars
- WHA draft: 15th overall, 1974; Houston Aeros
- Playing career: 1974–1978

Richard Francois Nantais (born October 27, 1954) is a Canadian former professional ice hockey player. He played 63 games in the National Hockey League with the Minnesota North Stars between 1974 and 1977.

== Career statistics ==
=== Regular season and playoffs ===
			Regular season					Playoffs
Season	Team	League	GP	G	A	Pts	PIM	GP	G	A	Pts	PIM
1970–71	Quebec Remparts	QMJHL	5	0	0	0	2	7	0	0	0	2
1971–72	Quebec Remparts	QMJHL	62	25	46	71	283	—	—	—	—	—
1972–73	Quebec Remparts	QMJHL	59	21	27	48	165	—	—	—	—	—
1972–73	Quebec Remparts	M-Cup	—	—	—	—	—	3	2	0	2	2
1973–74	Quebec Remparts	QMJHL	67	64	130	194	213	—	—	—	—	—
1973–74	Quebec Remparts	M-Cup	—	—	—	—	—	4	1	3	4	12
1974–75	New Haven Nighthawks	AHL	47	21	12	33	145	16	3	3	6	44
1974–75	Minnesota North Stars	NHL	18	4	1	5	9	—	—	—	—	—
1975–76	New Haven Nighthawks	AHL	38	8	6	14	79	—	—	—	—	—
1975–76	Springfield Indians	AHL	3	0	1	1	4	—	—	—	—	—
1975–76	Richmond Robins	AHL	21	3	4	7	39	8	2	4	6	33
1975–76	Minnesota North Stars	NHL	5	0	0	0	17	—	—	—	—	—
1976–77	Minnesota North Stars	NHL	40	1	3	4	53	—	—	—	—	—
1977–78	Fort Worth Texans	CHL	60	11	18	29	197	13	3	1	4	49
NHL totals			63	5	4	9	79	—	—	—	—	—
