= Kim MacDougall =

Canadian ice hockey player

- Born: August 29, 1954 (age 70); Regina, Saskatchewan, Canada
- Height: 5 ft 11 in (180 cm)
- Weight: 180 lb (82 kg; 12 st 12 lb)
- Position: Defence
- Shot: Left
- Played for: Minnesota North Stars
- NHL draft: 60th overall, 1974; Minnesota North Stars
- WHA draft: 37th overall, 1974; Winnipeg Jets
- Playing career: 1974–1976

Kim MacDougall (born August 29, 1954) is a Canadian retired professional ice hockey defenceman who played in one National Hockey League game for the Minnesota North Stars during the 1974–75 season, on March 5, 1975 against the Philadelphia Flyers. The rest of his career, which lasted from 1974 to 1976, was spent in the minor leagues.

== Career statistics ==
=== Regular season and playoffs ===
			Regular season					Playoffs
Season	Team	League	GP	G	A	Pts	PIM	GP	G	A	Pts	PIM
1971–72	Regina Pat Canadians U18	AAHA	—	—	—	—	—	—	—	—	—	—
1971–72	Regina Pats	WCHL	1	0	0	0	0	4	0	0	0	2
1972–73	Regina Pats	WCHL	68	3	15	18	37	4	0	0	0	2
1973–74	Regina Pats	WCHL	68	5	51	56	96	16	2	4	6	17
1974–75	Minnesota North Stars	NHL	1	0	0	0	0	—	—	—	—	—
1974–75	New Haven Nighthawks	AHL	57	3	12	15	24	16	0	2	2	21
1975–76	Fort Wayne Komets	IHL	52	8	16	24	38	—	—	—	—	—
1975–76	Columbus Owls	IHL	8	0	2	2	2	—	—	—	—	—
AHL totals			57	3	12	15	24	16	0	2	2	21
IHL totals			60	8	18	26	40	—	—	—	—	—
NHL totals			1	0	0	0	0	—	—	—	—	—

== See also ==
- List of players who played only one game in the NHL
