= Brian Kinsella =

Canadian ice hockey player (1954–2018)

- Born: February 11, 1954 Barrie, Ontario, Canada
- Died: October 14, 2018 (aged 64) Fort Myers, Florida, U.S.
- Height: 5 ft 11 in (180 cm)
- Weight: 176 lb (80 kg; 12 st 8 lb)
- Position: Right wing
- Shot: Right
- Played for: Washington Capitals
- NHL draft: 91st overall, 1974; Washington Capitals
- WHA draft: 16th overall, 1974; Phoenix Roadrunners
- Playing career: 1974–1984

Brian Edward Kinsella (February 11, 1954 – October 14, 2018) was a Canadian ice hockey player. Drafted in 1974 by the Washington Capitals of the National Hockey League and Phoenix Roadrunners of the World Hockey Association, Kinsella played ten games in the NHL and played most of his professional hockey career in the minors. He is also known by many as "The Big Bear Cat."

Kinsella was born in Barrie, Ontario. In addition to his playing career, Kinsella was head coach of St. Francis de Sales School hockey team from 2007 to 2012. Kinsella retired after guiding St. Francis for five seasons and leading the team to its first hockey state title in school history in 2011. In his first season he led the Knights to a Frozen Four berth in the OHSAA Ice Hockey State Tournament.

Kinsella died October 14, 2018, at his home in Fort Myers, Florida.

== Career statistics ==
			Regular season					Playoffs
Season	Team	League	GP	G	A	Pts	PIM	GP	G	A	Pts	PIM
1971–72	Oshawa Generals	OHL	44	13	19	32	48	12	5	4	9	32
1972–73	Oshawa Generals	OHL	48	28	57	85	49	—	—	—	—	—
1973–74	Oshawa Generals	OHL	64	36	43	79	95	—	—	—	—	—
1974–75	Richmond Robins	AHL	4	0	0	0	6	—	—	—	—	—
1974–75	Dayton Gems	IHL	40	15	15	30	35	—	—	—	—	—
1974–75	Kalamazoo Wings	IHL	10	3	7	10	36	—	—	—	—	—
1975–76	Washington Capitals	NHL	4	0	1	1	0	—	—	—	—	—
1975–76	Springfield Indians	AHL	1	0	0	0	0	—	—	—	—	—
1975–76	Dayton Gems	IHL	74	43	45	88	43	15	10	7	17	12
1976–77	Washington Capitals	NHL	6	0	0	0	0	—	—	—	—	—
1976–77	Springfield Indians	AHL	59	26	16	42	36	—	—	—	—	—
1977–78	Port Huron Flags	IHL	34	11	19	30	16	—	—	—	—	—
1978–79	Port Huron Flags	IHL	72	16	52	68	94	7	2	5	7	8
1979–80	Port Huron Flags	IHL	73	43	40	83	61	11	7	3	10	16
1980–81	Port Huron Flags	IHL	79	36	40	76	71	4	2	0	2	4
1981–82	Toledo Goaldiggers	IHL	80	36	45	81	71	12	8	7	15	10
1982–83	Toledo Goaldiggers	IHL	73	31	35	66	37	11	6	5	11	2
1983–84	Toledo Goaldiggers	IHL	41	18	19	37	27	—	—	—	—	—
NHL totals			10	0	1	1	0	—	—	—	—	—
AHL totals			64	26	16	42	42	—	—	—	—	—
IHL totals			576	252	317	569	491	60	35	27	62	52
