= Dave Given =

American ice hockey player (born 1954)

- Born: May 14, 1954 (age 71) Summit, New Jersey, U.S.
- Height: 5 ft 11 in (180 cm)
- Weight: 175 lb (79 kg; 12 st 7 lb)
- Position: Right wing
- Shot: Right
- Played for: Vancouver Blazers
- NHL draft: 101st overall, 1974; Buffalo Sabres
- WHA draft: 50th overall, 1974; Vancouver Blazers
- Playing career: 1974–1980

Dave Given (born May 14, 1954) is an American former professional ice hockey right winger. He played one game in the World Hockey Association for the Vancouver Blazers. He is an alumnus of Brown University.

Given grew up in Chatham Township, New Jersey and played hockey at Chatham Township High School, where he scored 36 goals and added 31 assists in the 1969–70 season. Chatham Township set a league record in a 23–0 win against Montclair Academy, in which Given scored eight goals, the first one scored six seconds into the game.

== Career statistics ==
=== Regular season and playoffs ===
			Regular season					Playoffs
Season	Team	League	GP	G	A	Pts	PIM	GP	G	A	Pts	PIM
1970–71	Essex Comets	NYMetJHL	29	25	14	39	16	—	—	—	—	—
1972–73	Brown University	ECAC	--	2	16	18	12	—	—	—	—	—
1973–74	Brown University	ECAC	23	10	15	25	12	—	—	—	—	—
1974–75	Brown University	ECAC	25	11	19	30	20	—	—	—	—	—
1974–75	Vancouver Blazers	WHA	1	0	0	0	0	—	—	—	—	—
1975–76	Charlotte Checkers	SHL	25	7	6	13	6	—	—	—	—	—
1975–76	Tidewater Sharks	SHL	35	8	14	22	12	—	—	—	—	—
1975–76	Buffalo Norsemen	NAHL	10	3	12	15	0	4	0	1	1	2
1976–77	Tidewater Sharks	SHL	41	8	10	18	10	—	—	—	—	—
1976–77	Erie Blades	NAHL	19	1	2	3	4	3	0	0	0	0
WHA totals			1	0	0	0	0	–	–	–	–	–
