= Andy Spruce =

Canadian ice hockey player

- Born: April 17, 1954 (age 71); London, Ontario, Canada
- Height: 5 ft 11 in (180 cm)
- Weight: 174 lb (79 kg; 12 st 6 lb)
- Position: Left wing
- Shot: Left
- Played for: Vancouver Canucks; Colorado Rockies
- NHL draft: 95th overall, 1974; Vancouver Canucks
- WHA draft: 90th overall, 1974; Phoenix Roadrunners
- Playing career: 1974–1982

Andrew William Spruce (born April 17, 1954) is a Canadian former professional ice hockey player who played 172 games in the National Hockey League with the Colorado Rockies and Vancouver Canucks.

== Early life ==
Born in London, Ontario, Spruce played major junior with the London Knights of the Ontario Hockey Association.

== Career ==
Spruce was selected by the Canucks in the 1974 NHL amateur draft. He turned professional that year, spending two seasons in the minor Central Hockey League. He joined the Canucks in 1976, splitting the season between the NHL and CHL, before moving to Colorado where he played for two seasons. Spruce spent one more season in the CHL, and two in the American Hockey League, before retiring in 1982.

== Career statistics ==
=== Regular season and playoffs ===
			Regular season					Playoffs
Season	Team	League	GP	G	A	Pts	PIM	GP	G	A	Pts	PIM
1971–72	London Knights	OHA	33	1	9	10	17	7	0	1	1	5
1972–73	London Knights	OHA	63	34	69	103	69	—	—	—	—	—
1973–74	London Knights	OHA	39	12	39	51	89	—	—	—	—	—
1974–75	Seattle Totems	CHL	65	17	31	48	104	—	—	—	—	—
1975–76	Tulsa Oilers	CHL	75	29	46	75	100	9	1	7	8	8
1976–77	Vancouver Canucks	NHL	51	9	6	15	37	—	—	—	—	—
1976–77	Tulsa Oilers	CHL	20	6	14	20	35	9	3	6	9	21
1977–78	Colorado Rockies	NHL	74	19	21	40	43	2	0	2	2	0
1978–79	Colorado Rockies	NHL	47	3	15	18	31	—	—	—	—	—
1979–80	Fort Worth Texans	CHL	77	31	41	72	97	15	8	6	14	10
1980–81	Springfield Indians	AHL	79	15	38	53	108	7	2	3	5	17
1981–82	Erie Blades	AHL	76	8	17	25	95	—	—	—	—	—
AHL totals			155	23	55	78	203	7	2	3	5	17
CHL totals			237	83	132	215	336	33	12	19	31	39
NHL totals			172	31	42	73	111	2	0	2	2	0
