= Brian Bye =

Canadian ice hockey player

- Born: June 27, 1954 (age 71) Brantford, Ontario, Canada
- Height: 5 ft 10 in (178 cm)
- Weight: 180 lb (82 kg; 12 st 12 lb)
- Position: Centre
- Shot: Left
- Played for: San Diego Mariners
- NHL draft: 232nd overall, 1974; New York Islanders
- WHA draft: 125th overall, 1974; San Diego Mariners
- Playing career: 1974–1978

Brian Eldon Bye (born June 27, 1954) is a Canadian former professional ice hockey player who played in the World Hockey Association (WHA). Drafted in the eighteenth round of the 1974 NHL amateur draft by the New York Islanders, Bye opted to play in the WHA after being selected by the San Diego Mariners in the ninth round of the 1974 WHA Amateur Draft. He played in one game for the Mariners during the 1975–76 WHA season.

== Career statistics ==
			Regular season					Playoffs
Season	Team	League	GP	G	A	Pts	PIM	GP	G	A	Pts	PIM
1972–73	Kitchener Rangers	OHA-Jr.	48	8	3	11	52	—	—	—	—	—
1973–74	Kitchener Rangers	OHA-Jr.	64	8	16	24	39	—	—	—	—	—
1974–75	Syracuse Blazers	NAHL-Sr.	63	15	14	29	54	7	1	1	2	7
1975–76	Roanoke Valley Rebels	SHL-Sr.	63	14	34	48	45	5	1	2	3	6
1975–76	San Diego Mariners	WHA	1	0	0	0	0	—	—	—	—	—
1976–77	Greensboro Generals	SHL-Sr.	40	14	13	27	28	—	—	—	—	—
1976–77	Cambridge Hornets	OHA-Sr.	7	2	3	5	9	—	—	—	—	—
1977–78	San Diego Mariners	PHL-Sr.	40	5	23	28	36	—	—	—	—	—
WHA totals			1	0	0	0	0	—	—	—	—	—
SHL-Sr. totals			103	28	47	75	73	5	1	2	3	6
