= Ron Ashton =

Canadian ice hockey player

- Born: May 8, 1954 (age 72) Saskatoon, Saskatchewan, Canada
- Height: 6 ft 2 in (188 cm)
- Weight: 210 lb (95 kg; 15 st 0 lb)
- Position: Left wing
- Shot: Left
- Played for: Winnipeg Jets
- NHL draft: 78th overall, 1974; Minnesota North Stars
- WHA draft: 27th overall, 1974; Winnipeg Jets
- Playing career: 1974–1979

Ronald Ashton (born May 8, 1954) is a Canadian former professional ice hockey left winger who played for the Winnipeg Jets of the WHA. In the World Hockey Association, he played 36 games and registered 1 goal, 3 assists, and 66 penalty minutes. He was best known as a fourth-line player and enforcer. Ashton's stint with the Jets included him playing with the likes of hockey superstars Bobby Hull, Anders Hedberg and Ulf Nilsson.

== Career ==
Ashton played junior hockey for his hometown Saskatoon Blades of the Western Canadian Hockey League (now WHL), playing his first full season in 1972–73 with future NHL and WHA players Bob Bourne, Dave Lewis and George Pesut, among others. In his first season as a left winger at age 18, he played in 67 games, seeing limited action, logging 4 goals and 5 assists for 9 points, along with 77 penalty minutes. Brought in to add size and toughness to the Blade's lineup, in his second season, Ashton displayed his ability to shake things up, amassing 232 penalty minutes, with 28 points over 65 games. His brother Gary also joined the Blades in 1972–73 but only played in 10 games. Ashton's toughness did not go unnoticed by NHL and WHA scouts, and the 1974 NHL amateur draft saw Ashton get selected by the now defunct Minnesota North Stars in the fifth round at #78. Conversely, the WHA's Winnipeg Jets saw Ashton as a player who could step into the lineup and add the bruising elements they needed, and as a result, drafted him higher in the second round, #27 in the 1974 WHA Secret Draft. With almost a guarantee that he would step right into the Jet's opening night lineup for the 1974–75 season, Ashton signed his first pro contract with Winnipeg. He made the roster out of camp and saw his first action as a pro player that very season. However, due to conditioning issues and injuries, Ashton split the 1974–75 season playing with the Jet's minor league affiliate the Roanoke Valley Rebels, of the now defunct Southern Hockey League. In the 1974-75 WHA season, he only logged 4 points (1 goal and 3 assists) over 36 games at his left-wing position with Winnipeg, and after spending almost half the season in the minors, Ashton did not make the Jet's lineup in the 1975–76 season. He began the 1975–76 season with Roanoke and then was traded to the WHA Cincinnati Stingers organization, where he resumed his career with their minor league affiliate, the Tidewater Sharks. In 53 games, he managed a respectable 30 points with 14 goals and 16 assists. Unable to make the WHA for the 1976–77 season, he was again on the move, this time he signed with the SHL's Winston-Salem Polar Twins where he played only 6 games. The last game that Ron Ashton played in professional hockey was with the Port Huron Flags of the International Hockey League 9IHL), in the 1978–79 season. He announced his retirement from professional hockey after that.

== Personal ==
Ron Ashton is the brother of former NHLer Brent Ashton who had a lengthy National Hockey League career, and Gary Ashton who played major junior hockey in the Western Canadian Hockey League, now called the Western Hockey League.

== Career statistics ==
=== Regular season and playoffs ===
			Regular season					Playoffs
Season	Team	League	GP	G	A	Pts	PIM	GP	G	A	Pts	PIM
1971–72	Saskatoon Blades	WCHL	3	0	0	0	0	––	––	––	––	––
1971–72	Saskatoon Olympics	SJHL	Statistics Unavailable
1972–73	Saskatoon Blades	WCHL	67	4	5	9	77	––	––	––	––	––
1973–74	Saskatoon Blades	WCHL	65	8	20	28	232	––	––	––	––	––
1974–75	Winnipeg Jets	WHA	36	1	3	4	66	––	––	––	––	––
1974–75	Roanoke Valley Rebels	SHL	26	6	8	14	33	4	0	0	0	2
1975–76	Roanoke Valley Rebels	SHL	8	0	2	2	26	––	––	––	––	––
1975–76	Tidewater Sharks	SHL	53	16	14	30	101	––	––	––	––	––
1976–77	Winston–Salem Polar Twins	SHL	6	3	1	4	14	––	––	––	––	––
1978–79	Port Huron Flags	IHL	1	2	0	2	0	––	––	––	––	––
WHA totals			36	1	3	4	66	—	—	—	—	—
