= Jerry Holland (ice hockey) =

Canadian ice hockey player

- Born: August 25, 1954 (age 71) Beaverlodge, Alberta, Canada
- Height: 5 ft 10 in (178 cm)
- Weight: 185 lb (84 kg; 13 st 3 lb)
- Position: Left wing
- Shot: Left
- Played for: New York Rangers; Edmonton Oilers
- NHL draft: 50th overall, 1974; New York Rangers
- WHA draft: 21st overall, 1974; Cincinnati Stingers
- Playing career: 1974–1978

Jerry Allan Holland (born August 25, 1954) is a Canadian former professional ice hockey winger who played 37 games in the National Hockey League (NHL) for the New York Rangers during the 1974–75 and 1975–76 seasons, and 22 games in the World Hockey Association with the Edmonton Oilers during the 1977–78 season.

== Career ==
Holland was selected by the Rangers in the third round (50th overall) of the 1974 NHL amateur draft and by the Cincinnati Stingers of the World Hockey Association (WHA) in the second round (21st overall) of the 1974 WHA Amateur Draft.

Playing for the Providence Reds in the 1974–1975 AHL season, Holland was awarded the Dudley "Red" Garrett Memorial Award for Outstanding Rookie of the Year.

== Career statistics ==
=== Regular season and playoffs ===
			Regular season					Playoffs
Season	Team	League	GP	G	A	Pts	PIM	GP	G	A	Pts	PIM
1970–71	Kamloops Rockets	BCJHL	60	33	39	72	50	—	—	—	—	—
1971–72	Calgary Centennials	WCHL	33	17	13	30	23	13	5	4	9	4
1972–73	Calgary Centennials	WCHL	67	51	54	105	66	6	2	5	7	9
1973–74	Calgary Centennials	WCHL	67	55	65	120	54	14	15	8	23	4
1974–75	New York Rangers	NHL	1	1	0	1	0	—	—	—	—	—
1974–75	Providence Reds	AHL	67	44	35	79	44	6	1	2	3	11
1975–76	New York Rangers	NHL	36	7	4	11	6	—	—	—	—	—
1975–76	Providence Reds	AHL	28	9	11	20	11	3	0	1	1	0
1976–77	New Haven Nighthawks	AHL	72	28	34	62	35	6	0	3	3	0
1977–78	Edmonton Oilers	WHA	22	2	1	3	14	—	—	—	—	—
1977–78	Salt Lake Golden Eagles	CHL	11	5	6	11	11	—	—	—	—	—
1978–79	Spokane Flyers	PHL	52	38	23	61	20	—	—	—	—	—
WHA totals			22	2	1	3	14	—	—	—	—	—
NHL totals			37	8	4	12	6	—	—	—	—	—
