= Denis Carufel =

Canadian ice hockey player (1954–2023)

- Born: January 23, 1954; Saint-Paul-l'Hermite, Quebec, Canada
- Died: October 27, 2023 (aged 69)
- Height: 5 ft 11 in (180 cm)
- Weight: 172 lb (78 kg; 12 st 4 lb)
- Position: Defence
- Caught: Left
- Played for: Maine Nordiques (NAHL )
- NHL draft: 162nd overall, 1974; Kansas City Scouts
- WHA draft: 98th overall, 1974; Quebec Nordiques
- Playing career: 1974–1975

Denis Carufel (January 23, 1954 – October 27, 2023) was a Canadian ice hockey defenceman. He was selected by the Kansas City Scouts in the tenth round (162nd overall) of the 1974 NHL amateur draft, and was also drafted by the Quebec Nordiques in the seventh round (98th overall) of the 1974 WHA Amateur Draft.

In 1999, Carufel was named to the All-time Sorel Black Hawks team (QMJHL) by a Canadian Hockey League panel.

Carufel died on October 27, 2023, at the age of 69.

== Awards and honours ==
| Award | Year |
|---|---|
| QMJHL First All-Star Team | 1973–74 |
