= Tom Price (ice hockey) =

Canadian ice hockey player

- Born: July 12, 1954 (age 70); Toronto, Ontario Canada
- Height: 6 ft 1 in (185 cm)
- Weight: 190 lb (86 kg; 13 st 8 lb)
- Position: Defence
- Shot: Right
- Played for: California Golden Seals; Cleveland Barons; Pittsburgh Penguins
- NHL draft: 57th overall, 1974; California Golden Seals
- WHA draft: 106th overall, 1974; Indianapolis Racers
- Playing career: 1974–1986

Thomas Edward Price (born July 12, 1954) is a Canadian former ice hockey defenseman who played 29 games in the National Hockey League.

== Early life ==
Price was born in Toronto. As a youth, he played in the 1967 Quebec International Pee-Wee Hockey Tournament with a minor ice hockey team from Toronto Township.

== Career ==
During his career, Price was a member of the California Golden Seals, the Cleveland Barons and the Pittsburgh Penguins between 1974 and 1979. The rest of his career, which lasted from 1974 to 1986, was mainly spent in the minor leagues.

== Career statistics ==
			Regular season					Playoffs
Season	Team	League	GP	G	A	Pts	PIM	GP	G	A	Pts	PIM
1972–73	London Knights	OHA	62	4	10	14	104	—	—	—	—	—
1973–74	Ottawa 67's	OHA	61	7	33	40	80	7	2	1	3	10
1974–75	California Golden Seals	NHL	3	0	0	0	4	—	—	—	—	—
1974–75	Salt Lake Golden Eagles	CHL	52	2	16	18	91	1	0	0	0	2
1975–76	California Golden Seals	NHL	5	0	0	0	0	—	—	—	—	—
1975–76	Salt Lake Golden Eagles	CHL	59	11	15	26	77	5	1	1	2	2
1976–77	Cleveland Barons	NHL	2	0	0	0	0	—	—	—	—	—
1976–77	Pittsburgh Penguins	NHL	7	0	2	2	4	—	—	—	—	—
1976–77	Salt Lake Golden Eagles	CHL	55	3	21	24	71	—	—	—	—	—
1977–78	Pittsburgh Penguins	NHL	10	0	0	0	0	—	—	—	—	—
1977–78	Binghamton Dusters	AHL	31	1	6	7	39	—	—	—	—	—
1977–78	Springfield Indians	AHL	21	0	9	9	23	4	1	2	3	6
1977–78	Grand Rapids Owls	IHL	9	1	8	9	30	—	—	—	—	—
1978–79	Pittsburgh Penguins	NHL	2	0	0	0	4	—	—	—	—	—
1978–79	Binghamton Dusters	AHL	70	14	31	45	62	10	1	7	8	16
1979–80	Syracuse Firebirds	AHL	68	4	34	38	58	4	1	4	5	0
1980–81	Springfield Indians	AHL	51	2	24	26	56	—	—	—	—	—
1981–82	New Haven Nighthawks	AHL	57	3	20	23	52	4	0	0	0	2
1982–83	Saginaw Gears	IHL	26	1	8	9	18	—	—	—	—	—
1983–84	New Haven Nighthawks	AHL	77	2	23	25	54	—	—	—	—	—
1985–86	New Haven Nighthawks	AHL	8	0	2	2	8	—	—	—	—	—
AHL totals			383	26	149	175	352	22	3	13	16	24
NHL totals			0	2 !2	12	—	—	—	—
