= Don Wheldon =

American ice hockey player

- Born: December 28, 1954 Falmouth, Massachusetts, U.S.
- Died: June 3, 1985 (aged 30) Falmouth, Massachusetts, U.S.
- Height: 6 ft 2 in (188 cm)
- Weight: 185 lb (84 kg; 13 st 3 lb)
- Position: Defense
- Shot: Right
- Played for: St. Louis Blues
- NHL draft: 87th overall, 1974; St. Louis Blues
- WHA draft: 178th overall, 1974; Indianapolis Racers
- Playing career: 1974–1977

Donald Edward Whelden (December 28, 1954 – June 3, 1985) was an American professional ice hockey defenseman who played two games for the St. Louis Blues in the 1974–75 season. He was born in Falmouth, Massachusetts.

Wheldon became the youngest US Player to appear in an NHL Game post 1967 Expansion at 19 years and 10 months. He supplanted Joe Noris. Bobby Carpenter supplanted Wheldon in 1981.

Whelden was killed on June 3, 1985, when a bolt of lightning hit a tree outside the home and broke a window above the head of his bed. His wife Linda was at his side and survived the tragic incident.

== Career statistics ==
=== Regular season and playoffs ===
			Regular season					Playoffs
Season	Team	League	GP	G	A	Pts	PIM	GP	G	A	Pts	PIM
1971–72	Riverview Reds	NBJHL	24	6	11	17	59	—	—	—	—	—
1971–72	Moncton Beavers	NBJHL	15	3	12	15	10	—	—	—	—	—
1972–73	London Knights	OHA	65	2	7	9	70	—	—	—	—	—
1973–74	London Knights	OHA	70	5	27	32	88	—	—	—	—	—
1974–75	St. Louis Blues	NHL	2	0	0	0	0	—	—	—	—	—
1974–75	Denver Spurs	CHL	8	0	1	1	8	—	—	—	—	—
1974–75	Columbus Owls	IHL	43	6	12	18	28	5	2	1	3	2
1975–76	Winston-Salem Polar Twins	SHL	70	11	28	39	52	4	1	0	1	4
1976–77	Winston-Salem Polar Twins	SHL	37	9	13	22	14	—	—	—	—	—
SHL totals			107	20	41	61	66	4	1	0	1	4
NHL totals			2	0	0	0	0	—	—	—	—	—
