= Ed Pizunski =

Canadian ice hockey player

- Born: April 6, 1954 (age 72) Toronto, Ontario, Canada
- Height: 5 ft 11 in (180 cm)
- Weight: 185 lb (84 kg; 13 st 3 lb)
- Position: Right wing
- Shot: Left
- Played for: Denver Spurs
- NHL draft: 203rd overall, 1974; Kansas City Scouts
- Playing career: 1975–1981

Ed Pizunski (born October 8, 1954) is a Canadian former professional ice hockey player.

Pizunski began his career at junior level with the Aurora Tigers and also played for the Peterborough Petes and the Toronto Nationals. He was selected by Kansas City Scouts in round 13 (#203 overall) of the 1974 NHL amateur draft but never played in the NHL. In the 1975–76 WHA season he played in the major leagues when he suited up with the Denver Spurs for one World Hockey Association regular season game. He also spent parts of that season in the North American Hockey League for the Erie Blades and Broome Dusters and the Central Hockey League for the Tucson Mavericks.

He then signed for the Muskegon Mohawks of the International Hockey League where he became a fan favourite and became widely for his agitating play and fighting style, accumulating 308 penalty minutes in 62 games. He was also an offensive presence for the team, scoring 19 goals and 22 assists for 41 points. He then moved back to the CHL with the Fort Worth Texans and also played two games for the Mohawks and four games with the CHL's Phoenix Roadrunners in their only season of existence. Spells in the CHL and IHL for the Texans, the Fort Wayne Komets and the Indianapolis Checkers was followed by one more season with the Mohawks before retiring due to an injury that he could not overcome.

He currently resides in Muskegon, Michigan where he has a local bar called the Tipsy Toad Tavern.

== Regular season and playoffs ==
			Regular season					Playoffs
Season	Team	League	GP	G	A	Pts	PIM	GP	G	A	Pts	PIM
1972–73	Aurora Tigers	OPJHL	17	7	8	15	0	—	—	—	—	—
1973–74	Peterborough Petes	OHA	66	5	18	23	101	—	—	—	—	—
1974–75	Toronto Nationals	OPJHL	77	0	0	0	200	—	—	—	—	—
1975–76	Erie Blades	NAHL	10	2	1	3	63	—	—	—	—	—
1975–76	Broome County Dusters	NAHL	13	1	2	3	90	—	—	—	—	—
1975–76	Tucson Mavericks	CHL	2	0	0	0	0	—	—	—	—	—
1975–76	Denver Spurs/Ottawa Civics	WHA	1	0	0	0	0	—	—	—	—	—
1976–77	Muskegon Mohawks	IHL	62	19	22	41	308	2	0	0	0	17
1977–78	Phoenix Roadrunners	CHL	4	3	2	5	4	—	—	—	—	—
1977–78	Fort Worth Texans	CHL	63	13	18	31	91	10	0	1	1	14
1977–78	Muskegon Mohawks	IHL	2	2	0	2	6	—	—	—	—	—
1978–79	Fort Worth Texans	CHL	68	29	16	45	62	3	1	1	2	5
1979–80	Fort Wayne Komets	IHL	5	2	3	5	4	—	—	—	—	—
1979–80	Indianapolis Checkers	CHL	60	22	21	43	51	7	2	4	6	4
1980–81	Muskegon Mohawks	IHL	37	18	20	38	106	—	—	—	—	—
WHA totals			1	0	0	0	0	—	—	—	—	—
