= Tony White (ice hockey) =

Canadian ice hockey player

- Born: June 16, 1954 (age 71) Grand Falls, Newfoundland, Canada
- Height: 5 ft 10 in (178 cm)
- Weight: 175 lb (79 kg; 12 st 7 lb)
- Position: Forward
- Played for: Washington Capitals; Minnesota North Stars; EV Füssen
- NHL draft: 161th overall, 1974; Washington Capitals
- WHA draft: 145th overall, 1974; New England Whalers
- Playing career: 1974–1983

Anthony Raymond White (born June 16, 1954) is a Canadian former professional ice hockey forward.

== Career ==
Drafted in 1974 by both the Washington Capitals of the National Hockey League and the New England Whalers of the World Hockey Association. White was a member of the Capitals and the Minnesota North Stars. He later played with the Oklahoma City Stars and ended his career with Fuessen EV in Germany.

== Career statistics ==
			Regular season					Playoffs
Season	Team	League	GP	G	A	Pts	PIM	GP	G	A	Pts	PIM
1972–73	Kitchener Rangers	OHA	60	20	33	53	65	—	—	—	—	—
1973–74	Kitchener Rangers	OHA	70	15	38	53	69	—	—	—	—	—
1974–75	Washington Capitals	NHL	5	0	2	2	0	—	—	—	—	—
1974–75	Dayton Gems	IHL	64	23	35	58	73	14	7	9	16	27
1975–76	Washington Capitals	NHL	80	25	17	42	56	—	—	—	—	—
1976–77	Washington Capitals	NHL	72	12	9	21	44	—	—	—	—	—
1977–78	Hershey Bears	AHL	68	24	29	53	28	—	—	—	—	—
1977–78	Washington Capitals	NHL	1	0	0	0	0	—	—	—	—	—
1978–79	Springfield Indians	AHL	80	26	29	55	30	—	—	—	—	—
1979–80	Minnesota North Stars	NHL	6	0	0	0	4	—	—	—	—	—
1979–80	Oklahoma City Stars	CHL	74	30	28	58	59	—	—	—	—	—
1980–81	Oklahoma City Stars	CHL	74	21	41	62	55	3	0	1	1	6
1981–82	EV Füssen	Germany	41	21	21	42	79	—	—	—	—	—
1982–83	EV Füssen	Germany	25	9	13	22	42	—	—	—	—	—
NHL totals			164	37	28	65	104	—	—	—	—	—
