= Cliff Cox =

Canadian ice hockey player (born 1954)

- Born: October 31, 1954 (age 71) Don Mills, Ontario, Canada
- Height: 5 ft 8 in (173 cm)
- Weight: 173 lb (78 kg; 12 st 5 lb)
- Position: Center
- Played for: New Hampshire; Nova Scotia Voyageurs; Flint Generals
- NHL draft: 187th, 1974; Montreal Canadiens
- WHA draft: 200th, 1974; New England Whalers
- Playing career: 1972–1978

Clifford Cox (born October 31, 1954) is a Canadian retired ice hockey center who was an All-American for New Hampshire.

== Career ==
Cox' college career began slowly with him scoring just 16 points in 26 games as a freshman. In his sophomore season, Cox' scoring exploded and he ended with 57 points to lead the Wildcats and help the team finish atop the ECAC Hockey standings. Unfortunately, UNH was stunned in the quarterfinals and lost an overtime game 6–7. After the season, Cox was drafted in both the NHL and WHA drafts. He was selected in the later rounds as professional teams typically didn't believe smaller players could handle the rigors of the professional game.

During his junior season, Cox suffered a shoulder injury and missed a chunk of the season. He managed to finish with respectable numbers and entered his senior season looking to give New Hampshire its first deep playoff run. The Wildcats finished the season in second place with both Cox and Jamie Hislop tied for the team lead in scoring. Both players were named as All-Americans but neither were able to get UNH a playoff victory. The Wildcats lost in the conference quarterfinals for the fourth consecutive year and Cox' college career was over.

After graduating, Cox joined the Montreal Canadiens's farm system but had a rough year to start. He played just 30 games with the Nova Scotia Voyageurs, scoring 6 points in 1976–77 He appeared in 2 playoff games as the team won the Calder Cup. The following season, Cox was in the IHL (though still a part of Montreal's system) and had a much better year, producing 57 points. He returned to the AHL briefly but otherwise spent the entire season in Flint. The team finished in the middle of the standings and were bounced in the quarterfinals. After the season, Cox retired as a player.

Cliff Cox was inducted into the New Hampshire athletic Hall of Fame in 1983.

== Career statistics ==
=== Regular season and playoffs ===
			Regular Season					Playoffs
Season	Team	League	GP	G	A	Pts	PIM	GP	G	A	Pts	PIM
1972–73	New Hampshire	ECAC Hockey	26	9	7	16	16	—	—	—	—	—
1973–74	New Hampshire	ECAC Hockey	31	27	30	57	30	—	—	—	—	—
1974–75	New Hampshire	ECAC Hockey	21	17	19	36	28	—	—	—	—	—
1975–76	New Hampshire	ECAC Hockey	30	34	32	66	37	—	—	—	—	—
1976–77	Nova Scotia Voyageurs	AHL	30	1	5	6	8	2	0	0	0	0
1977–78	Flint Generals	IHL	67	31	26	57	67	5	0	2	2	13
1977–78	Nova Scotia Voyageurs	AHL	1	0	0	0	0	—	—	—	—	—
NCAA Totals			108	87	88	175	111	—	—	—	—	—

== Awards and honors ==
Award	Year
All-ECAC Hockey Second Team	1975–76
AHCA East All-American	1975–76
