= Glen Burdon =

Canadian ice hockey player

- Born: August 4, 1954 (age 71) Lumsden, Saskatchewan, Canada
- Height: 6 ft 2 in (188 cm)
- Weight: 180 lb (82 kg; 12 st 12 lb)
- Position: Centre
- Shot: Left
- Played for: Kansas City Scouts
- NHL draft: 20th overall, 1974; Kansas City Scouts
- WHA draft: 23rd overall, 1974; Edmonton Oilers
- Playing career: 1974–1979

Glen William Burdon (born August 4, 1954) is a Canadian former professional ice hockey centreman who played 11 games in the National Hockey League for the Kansas City Scouts. Burdon played junior hockey with the Regina Pats of the Western Canada Hockey League and was selected by both the Scouts in the 1974 NHL amateur draft and the Edmonton Oilers of the World Hockey Association in the 1974 WHA Amateur Draft. Signing with the Scouts he made his NHL debut that year, also playing in the minor American Hockey League (AHL). He played parts of three more seasons in both the AHL and International Hockey League before retiring in 1979.

== Career statistics ==
=== Regular season and playoffs ===
			Regular season					Playoffs
Season	Team	League	GP	G	A	Pts	PIM	GP	G	A	Pts	PIM
1970–71	Fort Qu'Appelle Silver Foxes	SJHL	—	—	—	—	—	—	—	—	—	—
1971–72	Regina Pats	WCHL	60	17	36	53	78	14	1	8	9	14
1972–73	Regina Pats	WCHL	46	21	28	49	13	16	6	11	17	25
1973–74	Regina Pats	WCHL	68	19	56	75	44	—	—	—	—	—
1974–75	Kansas City Scouts	NHL	11	0	2	2	0	—	—	—	—	—
1974–75	Baltimore Clippers	AHL	5	0	0	0	0	—	—	—	—	—
1974–75	Providence Reds	AHL	25	1	2	3	12	—	—	—	—	—
1975–76	New Haven Nighthawks	AHL	23	1	5	6	6	—	—	—	—	—
1976–77	Kansas City Blues	CHL	3	0	0	0	0	—	—	—	—	—
1978–79	Fort Wayne Komets	IHL	5	0	2	2	7	—	—	—	—	—
NHL totals			11	0	2	2	0	—	—	—	—	—
