= Gord McTavish =

Canadian ice hockey player (born 1954)

- Born: June 3, 1954 (age 71) Guelph, Ontario, Canada
- Height: 6 ft 4 in (193 cm)
- Weight: 200 lb (91 kg; 14 st 4 lb)
- Position: Centre
- Shot: Right
- Played for: St. Louis Blues; Winnipeg Jets
- NHL draft: 15th overall, 1974; Montreal Canadiens
- WHA draft: 51st overall, 1974; Winnipeg Jets
- Playing career: 1974–1980

Gordon McTavish (born June 3, 1954) is a Canadian former professional ice hockey centre. He was drafted in the first round, 15th overall, by the Montreal Canadiens in the 1974 NHL amateur draft.

He was also drafted by the Winnipeg Jets of the World Hockey Association. He played eleven games in his National Hockey League career: one with the St. Louis Blues in the 1978–79 season and ten with the Jets (after the team joined the NHL) in the 1979–80 season.

== Career statistics ==
=== Regular season and playoffs ===
			Regular season					Playoffs
Season	Team	League	GP	G	A	Pts	PIM	GP	G	A	Pts	PIM
1973–74	Sudbury Wolves	OHA	68	34	49	83	155	3	0	0	0	2
1974–75	Nova Scotia Voyageurs	AHL	65	14	19	33	125	4	0	1	1	5
1975–76	Nova Scotia Voyageurs	AHL	44	12	17	29	69	9	3	2	5	18
1976–77	Nova Scotia Voyageurs	AHL	78	30	28	58	84	12	4	8	12	12
1977–78	Nova Scotia Voyageurs	AHL	76	26	41	67	108	11	4	5	9	6
1978–79	Salt Lake Golden Eagles	CHL	68	36	22	58	64	10	6	6	12	27
1978–79	St. Louis Blues	NHL	1	0	0	0	0	—	—	—	—	—
1979–80	Tulsa Oilers	CHL	26	6	12	18	6	—	—	—	—	—
1979–80	Winnipeg Jets	NHL	10	1	3	4	2	—	—	—	—	—
1980–81	SC Rapperswil–Jona	NDA	—	—	—	—	—	—	—	—	—	—
AHL totals			263	82	105	187	386	36	11	16	27	41
NHL totals			11	1	3	4	2	—	—	—	—	—

Preceded by Mario Tremblay	Montreal Canadiens first-round draft pick 1974	Succeeded by Robin Sadler
