= Rick Fraser (ice hockey) =

Canadian ice hockey player (1954–2020)

- Born: July 11, 1954 Sarnia, Ontario, Canada
- Died: November 16, 2020 (aged 66) Sarnia, Ontario, Canada
- Height: 5 ft 11 in (180 cm)
- Weight: 180 lb (82 kg; 12 st 12 lb)
- Position: Defence
- Shot: Right
- Played for: Indianapolis Racers
- NHL draft: 173rd overall, 1974; Chicago Black Hawks
- WHA draft: 231st overall, 1974; Indianapolis Racers
- Playing career: 1974–1979

Richard Fraser (July 11, 1954 – November 16, 2020) was a Canadian professional ice hockey defenceman who played in the World Hockey Association (WHA).

== Career ==
Drafted in the tenth round of the 1974 NHL amateur draft by the Chicago Black Hawks, Fraser opted to play in the WHA after being selected by the Indianapolis Racers in the seventeenth round of the 1974 WHA Amateur Draft. His participation saw him playing four games for the Racers during the 1974–75 WHA season. He was the younger brother of former National Hockey League referee Kerry Fraser.

== Personal life ==
Fraser died on November 16, 2020, at the age of 66, due to cancer.

== Career statistics ==
=== Regular season and playoffs ===
			Regular season					Playoffs
Season	Team	League	GP	G	A	Pts	PIM	GP	G	A	Pts	PIM
1971–72	Oshawa Generals	OHA	63	0	19	19	24	—	—	—	—	—
1972–73	Oshawa Generals	OHA	57	2	24	26	23	—	—	—	—	—
1973–74	Oshawa Generals	OHA	69	4	18	22	25	—	—	—	—	—
1974–75	Indianapolis Racers	WHA	4	0	0	0	2	—	—	—	—	—
1974–75	Mohawk Valley Comets	NAHL	54	3	36	39	34	4	0	0	0	0
1975–76	Mohawk Valley Comets	NAHL	29	2	13	15	16	—	—	—	—	—
1975–76	Toledo Goaldiggers	IHL	43	3	18	21	15	4	0	2	2	2
1976–77	Toledo Goaldiggers	IHL	1	0	0	0	0	—	—	—	—	—
1976–77	Port Huron Flags	IHL	56	8	27	35	47	—	—	—	—	—
1978–79	Port Huron Flags	IHL	—	—	—	—	—	1	0	1	1	7
1979–80	Petrolia Squires	CSAHL	Statistics Unavailable
WHA totals			4	0	0	0	2	—	—	—	—	—
