= Jerry Badiuk =

Canadian ice hockey player (born 1954)

- Born: October 2, 1954 (age 70); Windsor, Ontario, Canada
- Height: 5 ft 11 in (180 cm)
- Weight: 200 lb (91 kg; 14 st 4 lb)
- Position: Defence / Right wing
- Played for: Toledo Goaldiggers (IHL); Omaha Knights (CHL); Baltimore Clippers (AHL)
- NHL draft: 82nd overall, 1974; Atlanta Flames
- WHA draft: 119th overall, 1974; Houston Aeros
- Playing career: 1974–1978

Jerry Badiuk (born October 2, 1954) is a Canadian retired professional and an ice hockey player. He was selected by the Atlanta Flames in the fifth round (82nd overall) of the 1974 NHL amateur draft, and was also selected by the Houston Aeros in the eighth round (119th overall) of the 1974 WHA Amateur Draft.

Prior to turning professional, Badiuk played major junior hockey with the Kitchener Rangers in the Ontario Hockey Association. He was picked in both the 1974 NHL amateur draft and the 1974 WHA Amateur Draft, and he went on to play four seasons of professional hockey with the Toledo Goaldiggers, Omaha Knights, and Baltimore Clippers. Badiuk was primarily employed as a defenceman, but he also played right wing for the Toledo Goaldiggers during the 1976–77 season.
