= Paul Nicholson (ice hockey) =

Canadian ice hockey player

- Born: July 24, 1955; Listowel, Ontario, Canada
- Died: September 20, 2011 (aged 56); London, Ontario, Canada
- Height: 6 ft 0 in (183 cm)
- Weight: 190 lb (86 kg; 13 st 8 lb)
- Position: Left wing
- Shot: Left
- Played for: Washington Capitals
- NHL draft: 55th overall, 1974; Washington Capitals
- WHA draft: 40th overall, 1974; Michigan Stags
- Playing career: 1974–1978

Peter John Paul Nicholson (February 16, 1954 – September 20, 2011) was a Canadian ice hockey forward. He played 62 games in the National Hockey Leaguefor the Washington Capitals from 1974 to 1976. He was selected in the 1974 NHL Amateur Draft by the Capitals, and in the 1974 WHA Amateur Draft by the Michigan Stags of the World Hockey Association.

== Career statistics ==
=== Regular season and playoffs ===
			Regular season					Playoffs
Season	Team	League	GP	G	A	Pts	PIM	GP	G	A	Pts	PIM
1971–72	London Knights	OHA	62	18	16	34	50	7	1	0	1	7
1972–73	London Knights	OHA	60	16	18	34	42	—	—	—	—	—
1973–74	London Knights	OHA	67	36	33	69	60	—	—	—	—	—
1974–75	Washington Capitals	NHL	39	4	5	9	7	—	—	—	—	—
1974–75	Richmond Robins	AHL	34	9	13	22	26	2	0	0	0	2
1975–76	Washington Capitals	NHL	14	0	2	2	9	—	—	—	—	—
1975–76	Richmond Robins	AHL	4	0	0	0	0	—	—	—	—	—
1975–76	Dayton Gems	IHL	55	35	37	72	76	15	11	9	20	15
1976–77	Washington Capitals	NHL	9	0	1	1	2	—	—	—	—	—
1976–77	Springfield Indians	AHL	1	0	0	0	0	—	—	—	—	—
1976–77	Dayton Gems	IHL	67	28	39	67	50	4	1	4	5	2
1977–78	Port Huron Flags	IHL	77	34	46	80	54	17	9	8	17	6
IHL totals			199	97	122	219	180	36	21	21	42	23
NHL totals			62	4	8	12	18	—	—	—	—	—
