= Michel Dubois (ice hockey) =

Canadian ice hockey player

- Born: November 7, 1954 (age 71) Montreal, Quebec, Canada
- Height: 5 ft 11 in (180 cm)
- Weight: 181 lb (82 kg; 12 st 13 lb)
- Position: Defence
- Shot: Left
- Played for: Indianapolis Racers; Quebec Nordiques
- NHL draft: Undrafted
- WHA draft: 198th overall, 1974; Chicago Cougars
- Playing career: 1974–1978

Michel Dubois (born November 7, 1954) is a Canadian former professional ice hockey player who played in the World Hockey Association (WHA). Dubois played parts of two WHA seasons with the Indianapolis Racers and Quebec Nordiques. He was drafted in the twelfth round of the 1974 WHA Amateur Draft by the Chicago Cougars.

== Career statistics ==
=== Regular season and playoffs ===
			Regular season					Playoffs
Season	Team	League	GP	G	A	Pts	PIM	GP	G	A	Pts	PIM
1973–74	Chicoutimi Sagueneens	QMJHL	59	10	32	42	168	––	––	––	––	––
1974–75	Long Island Cougars	NAHL	67	8	18	26	96	11	3	0	3	35
1975–76	Mohawk Valley Comets	NAHL	16	1	4	5	54	––	––	––	––	––
1975–76	Indianapolis Racers	WHA	34	2	2	4	104	––	––	––	––	––
1975–76	Quebec Nordiques	WHA	21	0	3	3	23	––	––	––	––	––
1976–77	Quebec Nordiques	WHA	4	0	0	0	0	2	0	1	1	0
1976–77	Maine Nordiques	NAHL	57	20	35	55	202	12	4	6	10	27
1977–78	Philadelphia Firebirds	AHL	46	4	8	12	85	––	––	––	––	––
1977–78	Springfield Indians	AHL	2	1	1	2	7	4	0	3	3	13
WHA totals			59	2	5	7	127	2	0	1	1	0
