= Ray Maluta =

Canadian ice hockey player

- Born: July 24, 1954 (age 71); Flin Flon, Manitoba, Canada
- Height: 5 ft 8 in (173 cm)
- Weight: 173 lb (78 kg; 12 st 5 lb)
- Position: Defence
- Shot: Left
- Played for: HC Salzburg; Boston Bruins
- NHL draft: 126th overall, 1974; Boston Bruins
- WHA draft: 80th overall, 1974; San Diego Mariners
- Playing career: 1974–1992

Raymond William Maluta (born July 24, 1954) is a Canadian retired professional ice hockey player who played 25 games in the National Hockey League for the Boston Bruins between 1975 and 1976. Maluta was born in Flin Flon, Manitoba.

Maluta scored just two goals in his NHL career, but one of them was the first Boston goal of the 1976-77 season. It was scored against Pete LoPresti of the Minnesota North Stars in Boston's 6-2 victory.

From 1999 until early 2012, he was the executive general manager of the Sports Centre at MCC in Brighton, New York. He became a consultant to the facility in January 2012 when Rory Fitzpatrick was named general manager.

In 2007, Maluta became the head coach of the United States national ice sledge hockey team, leading them to a bronze medal in the International Paralympic Committee World Championship in 2008 and a gold medal in 2009.

== Career statistics ==
=== Regular season and playoffs ===
			Regular season					Playoffs
Season	Team	League	GP	G	A	Pts	PIM	GP	G	A	Pts	PIM
1970–71	Flin Flon Bombers	WCHL	9	0	2	2	6	1	0	0	0	0
1971–72	Flin Flon Bombers	WCHL	64	8	32	40	142	5	1	4	5	18
1972–73	Flin Flon Bombers	WCHL	65	11	40	51	116	9	3	8	11	21
1973–74	Flin Flon Bombers	WCHL	68	40	57	97	151	7	0	4	4	23
1974–75	Rochester Americans	AHL	75	7	12	19	117	12	3	0	3	42
1975–76	Rochester Americans	AHL	74	3	43	46	170	7	0	2	2	6
1975–76	Boston Bruins	NHL	2	0	0	0	2	2	0	0	0	0
1976–77	Rochester Americans	AHL	51	2	24	26	138	12	0	5	5	16
1976–77	Boston Bruins	NHL	23	2	3	5	4	—	—	—	—	—
1977–78	Rochester Americans	AHL	79	9	32	41	125	6	1	3	4	16
1978–79	Rochester Americans	AHL	35	4	14	18	58	—	—	—	—	—
1979–80	HC Salzburg	AUT	33	15	55	70	64	—	—	—	—	—
AHL totals			314	25	125	150	608	37	4	10	14	80
NHL totals			25	2	3	5	6	2	0	0	0	0
