= Cam Botting =

Canadian professional ice hockey forward

- Born: March 10, 1954 (age 72) Kingston, Ontario, Canada
- Height: 6 ft 2 in (188 cm)
- Weight: 205 lb (93 kg; 14 st 9 lb)
- Position: Right wing
- Shot: Left
- Played for: Atlanta Flames
- NHL draft: 64th overall, 1974; Atlanta Flames
- WHA draft: 112th overall, 1974; Edmonton Oilers
- Playing career: 1974–1984

Cameron Allan Botting (born March 10, 1954) is a Canadian professional ice hockey forward who played two games in the National Hockey League for the Atlanta Flames during the 1975–76 season. The rest of his career, which lasted from 1974 to 1984, was spent in various minor leagues.

== Career statistics ==
=== Regular season and playoffs ===
			Regular season					Playoffs
Season	Team	League	GP	G	A	Pts	PIM	GP	G	A	Pts	PIM
1971–72	Hamilton Red Wings	OHA-Jr	27	1	6	7	17	—	—	—	—	—
1972–73	Niagara Falls Flyers	SOJHL	48	30	23	53	113	—	—	—	—	—
1972–73	Hamilton Red Wings	OHA-Jr	8	1	3	4	7	—	—	—	—	—
1973–74	Niagara Falls Flyers	SOJHL	48	40	56	96	210	—	—	—	—	—
1974–75	Omaha Knights	CHL	15	2	3	5	9	—	—	—	—	—
1974–75	Des Moines Capitols	IHL	49	8	5	13	30	7	0	3	3	9
1975–76	Atlanta Flames	NHL	2	0	1	1	0	—	—	—	—	—
1975–76	Tulsa Oilers	CHL	73	22	29	51	68	9	2	5	7	6
1976–77	Tulsa Oilers	CHL	74	26	23	49	74	9	3	1	4	0
1977–78	Tulsa Oilers	CHL	76	17	26	43	52	7	0	2	2	4
1979–80	Dundas Blues	GBSHL	—	—	—	—	—	—	—	—	—	—
1980–81	Dundas Blues	OHA-Sr	—	—	—	—	—	—	—	—	—	—
1981–82	Dundas Blues	OHA-Sr	—	—	—	—	—	—	—	—	—	—
1982–83	Flint Generals	IHL	12	2	4	6	9	—	—	—	—	—
1982–83	Erie Golden Blades	ACHL	49	9	27	36	13	5	2	3	5	0
1983–84	Erie Golden Blades	ACHL	13	2	2	4	22	—	—	—	—	—
CHL totals			238	67	81	148	203	25	5	8	13	10
NHL totals			2	0	1	1	0	—	—	—	—	—
