= 1974 WHA amateur draft =

1974 North American ice hockey draft

General information
- Dates: February 25, 1974; May 31, 1974

Overview
- 237 total selections in 21 rounds
- First selection: (Canada) Greg Joly; Selected by: Phoenix Roadrunners (secret amateur draft) (Canada) Pat Price; Selected by: Vancouver Blazers (official amateur draft)

The 1974 WHA amateur draft was the second amateur draft held by the World Hockey Association. The first two rounds of the draft were conducted in secret in February and only graduating junior players (born in 1954) were eligible for selection. The remaining rounds were conducted on May 31.

However, the WHA had reached an agreement with the Canadian Amateur Hockey Association between the two draft sessions, which permitted the WHA teams to draft one underage junior player (born in 1955 or 1956) in either the first or second round. As a result, the WHA renumbered the rounds of the draft, indicating that the first two rounds—conducted in February—were now rounds three and four, while the first two rounds conducted in May were rounds one and two, keeping them eligible to draft the underage players.

== Selections by round ==
Listed below are the selections made in the 1974 WHA amateur draft.

Selections by round

Round 1 (February) | Round 2 (February) | Round 1 (May) | Round 2 (May) | Round 3 | Round 4 | Round 5 | Round 6 | Round 7 | Round 8 | Round 9 | Round 10 | Round 11 | Round 12 | Round 13 | Round 14 | Round 15 | Round 16 | Round 17 | Round 18 | Round 19

=== Secret amateur draft ===
==== Round 1 (February) ====
#	Player	Nationality	WHA team	College/junior/club team
1	Greg Joly (D)	Canada	Phoenix Roadrunners	Regina Pats (WCHL)
2	Bill Lochead (F)	Canada	Indianapolis Racers	Oshawa Generals (OHA)
3	Tiger Williams (F)	Canada	Cincinnati Stingers	Swift Current Broncos (WCHL)
4	Cam Connor (RW)	Canada	Phoenix Roadrunners (from Michigan)	Flin Flon Bombers (WCHL)
5	Ron Greschner (D)	Canada	Vancouver Blazers	New Westminster Bruins (WCHL)
6	Rick Chartraw (D)	United States	San Diego Mariners	Kitchener Rangers (OHA)
7	Clark Gillies (F)	Canada	Edmonton Oilers (from Winnipeg)	Regina Pats (WCHL)
8	Paul McIntosh (D)	Canada	Chicago Cougars (from Edmonton)	Peterborough Petes (OHA)
9	John Hughes (D)	Canada	Houston Aeros (from Quebec)	Toronto Marlboros (OHA)
10	Doug Risebrough (F)	Canada	Cleveland Crusaders (from Chicago)	Kitchener Rangers (OHA)
11	Danny Gare (F)	Canada	Winnipeg Jets (from Cleveland)	Calgary Centennials (WCHL)
12	Alain Daigle (F)	Canada	Quebec Nordiques (from Toronto)	Trois-Rivieres Ducs (QMJHL)
13	Bruce Affleck (D)	Canada	Cleveland Crusaders (from New England)	University of Denver (WCHA)
14	Peter Sturgeon (LW)	Canada	New England Whalers (from Minnesota)	Kitchener Rangers (OHA)
15	Rich Nantais (LW)	Canada	Houston Aeros	Quebec Remparts (QMJHL)

==== Round 2 (February) ====
#	Player	Nationality	WHA team	College/junior/club team
16	Brian Kinsella (RW)	Canada	Phoenix Roadrunners	Oshawa Generals (OHA)
17	Bob Bourne (C)	Canada	Indianapolis Racers	Saskatoon Blades (WCHL)
18	Dave Inkpen (D)	Canada	Cincinnati Stingers	Edmonton Oil Kings (WCHL)
19	Mike Rogers (C)	Canada	Edmonton Oilers (from Michigan)	Calgary Centennials (WCHL)
20	Ron Chipperfield (C)	Canada	Vancouver Blazers	Brandon Wheat Kings (WCHL)
21	Jerry Holland (LW)	Canada	Cincinnati Stingers (from San Diego)	Calgary Centennials (WCHL)
22	Bill Evo (LW)	United States	Cincinnati Stingers (from Winnipeg)	Peterborough Petes (OHA)
23	Brad Winton (C)	Canada	Phoenix Roadrunners (from Cincinnati via Edmonton)	Toronto Marlboros (OHA)
24	Mike Palmateer (G)	Canada	Cincinnati Stingers (from Quebec)	Toronto Marlboros (OHA)
25	John Stewart (C)	Canada	Cleveland Crusaders (from Chicago)	Bowling Green State University (CCHA)
26	Gord McTavish (F)	Canada	Winnipeg Jets (from Cleveland)	Sudbury Wolves (OHA)
27	Ron Ashton (LW)	Canada	Winnipeg Jets (from Toronto)	Saskatoon Blades (WCHL)
28	John Paddock (F)	Canada	Minnesota Fighting Saints (from New England)	Brandon Wheat Kings (WCHL)
29	Michel Deziel (LW)	Canada	New England Whalers (from Minnesota)	Sorel Black Hawks (QMJHL)
30	Terry Ruskowski (C)	Canada	Houston Aeros	Swift Current Broncos (WCHL)

=== Amateur draft ===
==== Round 1 (May) ====
#	Player	Nationality	WHA team	College/junior/club team
1	Pat Price (D)	Canada	Vancouver Blazers (from Phoenix)	Saskatoon Blades (WCHL)
2	Mike Will (C)	Canada	Indianapolis Racers	Edmonton Oil Kings (WCHL)
3	Don Larway (RW)	Canada	Cincinnati Stingers	Swift Current Broncos (WCHL)
4	Bill Reed (D)	Canada	Michigan Stags	Sault Ste. Marie Greyhounds (OHA)
5	Dennis Olmstead (C)	Canada	Phoenix Roadrunners (from Vancouver)	University of Wisconsin (WCHA)
6	Brad Rhiness (C)	Canada	San Diego Mariners	Kingston Canadians (OHA)
7	Randy Andreachuk (C)	Canada	Winnipeg Jets	Kamloops Chiefs (WCHL)
8	Doug Soetaert (G)	Canada	Edmonton Oilers	Edmonton Oil Kings (WCHL)
9	Real Cloutier (F)	Canada	Quebec Nordiques	Quebec Remparts (QMJHL)
10	Gary MacGregor (C)	Canada	Chicago Cougars	Cornwall Royals (QMJHL)
11	Paul Baxter (D)	Canada	Cleveland Crusaders	Winnipeg Clubs (WCHL)
12	Jim Turkiewicz (D)	Canada	Toronto Toros	Peterborough Petes (OHA)
13	Tim Young (F)	Canada	New England Whalers	Ottawa 67's (OHA)
14	Bruce Boudreau (C)	Canada	Minnesota Fighting Saints	Toronto Marlboros (OHA)
15	Dick Spannbauer (D)	United States	Houston Aeros	University of Minnesota (WCHA)

==== Round 2 (May) ====
#	Player	Nationality	WHA team	College/junior/club team
16	Dave Gorman (RW)	Canada	Phoenix Roadrunners	St. Catharines Black Hawks (OHA)
17	Craig Hanmer (D)	United States	Indianapolis Racers	St. Paul Vulcans (MidJHL)
18	Bryan Trottier (F)	Canada	Cincinnati Stingers	Swift Current Broncos (WCHL)
19	Rick Blight (RW)	Canada	Michigan Stags	Brandon Wheat Kings (WCHL)
20	Jacques Cossette (RW)	Canada	Vancouver Blazers	Sorel Black Hawks (QMJHL)
21	Kevin Devine (LW)	Canada	San Diego Mariners	Toronto Marlboros (OHA)
22	Brian Engblom (D)	Canada	Winnipeg Jets	University of Wisconsin (WCHA)
23	Glen Burdon (D)	Canada	Edmonton Oilers	Regina Pats (WCHL)
24	Charles Constantin (LW)	Canada	Quebec Nordiques	Quebec Remparts (QMJHL)
25	Tim Burke (D)	United States	Chicago Cougars	University of New Hampshire (ECAC)
26	Charlie Simmer (F)	Canada	Cleveland Crusaders	Sault Ste. Marie Greyhounds (OHA)
27	Roger Lemelin (D)	Canada	Toronto Toros	London Knights (OHA)
28	Mike Eruzione (LW)	United States	New England Whalers	Boston University (ECAC)
29	Rob Laird (LW)	Canada	Minnesota Fighting Saints	Regina Pats (WCHL)
30	Pierre Larouche (F)	Canada	Houston Aeros	Sorel Black Hawks (QMJHL)

==== Round 3 ====
#	Player	Nationality	WHA team	College/junior/club team
31	Jim Clarke (D)	Canada	Phoenix Roadrunners	Toronto Marlboros (OHA)
32	Mike Wong (C)	United States	Indianapolis Racers	Minnesota Junior Stars (MidJHL)
33	Mark Lomenda (RW)	Canada	Chicago Cougars (from Cincinnati)	Victoria Cougars (WCHL)
34	Barry Legge (D)	Canada	Michigan Stags	Winnipeg Clubs (WCHL)
35	Peter Driscoll (LW)	Canada	Vancouver Blazers	Kingston Canadians (OHA)
36	Jim Warden (G)	United States	San Diego Mariners	Michigan Tech (WCHA)
37	Kim MacDougall (D)	Canada	Winnipeg Jets	Regina Pats (WCHL)
38	Paul Holmgren (F)	United States	Edmonton Oilers	St. Paul Vulcans (MidJHL)
39	Garry Lariviere (D)	Canada	Chicago Cougars (from Quebec)	St. Catharines Black Hawks (OHA)
40	Paul Nicholson (LW)	Canada	Michigan Stags (from Chicago)	London Knights (OHA)
41	Brad Anderson (C)	Canada	Cincinnati Stingers (from Cleveland)	Victoria Cougars (WCHL)
42	Carlo Torresan (D)	Canada	Toronto Toros	Sorel Black Hawks (QMJHL)
43	Peter Brown (D)	United States	New England Whalers	Boston University (ECAC)
44	Buzz Schneider (LW)	United States	Minnesota Fighting Saints	University of Minnesota (WCHA)
45	Pete LoPresti (G)	United States	Houston Aeros	University of Denver (WCHA)

==== Round 4 ====
#	Player	Nationality	WHA team	College/junior/club team
46	Bruce Aberhart (G)	Canada	Phoenix Roadrunners	London Knights (OHA)
47	Mike Zuke (C)	Canada	Indianapolis Racers	Michigan Tech (WCHA)
48	Bob Murray (D)	Canada	Cincinnati Stingers	Cornwall Royals (QMJHL)
49	Jamie Hislop (F)	Canada	Cleveland Crusaders (from Michigan)	University of New Hampshire (ECAC)
50	Dave Given (F)	United States	Vancouver Blazers	Brown University (ECAC)
51	Jamie Bateman (F)	Canada	San Diego Mariners	Quebec Remparts (QMJHL)
52	Boyd Anderson (LW)	Canada	Winnipeg Jets	Medicine Hat Tigers (WCHL)
53	Kevin Treacy (RW)	Canada	Edmonton Oilers	Cornwall Royals (QMJHL)
54	Jean Bernier (D)	Canada	Quebec Nordiques	Shawinigan Bruins (QMJHL)
55	Paul Evans (C)	Canada	Chicago Cougars	Kitchener Rangers (OHA)
56	Derrick Emerson (F)	Canada	San Diego Mariners (from Cleveland)	Montreal Red White and Blue (QMJHL)
57	Ron Sedlbauer (LW)	Canada	Toronto Toros	Kitchener Rangers (OHA)
58	Dick Lamby (D)	United States	New England Whalers	Salem State College (ECAC-2)
59	David Hanson (D)	United States	Minnesota Fighting Saints	St. Paul Vulcans (MidJHL)
60	Derek Smith (F)	Canada	Houston Aeros	Ottawa 67's (OHA)

==== Round 5 ====
#	Player	Nationality	WHA team	College/junior/club team
61	Gordon Buynak (D)	United States	Phoenix Roadrunners	Kingston Canadians (OHA)
62	Pat Ribble (D)	Canada	Indianapolis Racers	Oshawa Generals (OHA)
63	Larry Finck (D)	Canada	Michigan Stags	St. Catharines Black Hawks (OHA)
64	Steve Jensen (LW)	United States	Vancouver Blazers	Michigan Tech (WCHA)
65	Mike Boland (D)	Canada	San Diego Mariners	Sault Ste. Marie Greyhounds (OHA)
66	Rick Uhrich (RW)	Canada	Winnipeg Jets	Regina Pats (WCHL)
67	Dave Langevin (D)	United States	Edmonton Oilers	University of Minnesota-Duluth (WCHA)
68	Dave Logan (D)	Canada	Quebec Nordiques	Laval National (QMJHL)
69	Scott Jessee (RW)	United States	Chicago Cougars	Michigan Tech (WCHA)
70	Mike Thompson (D)	Canada	Cleveland Crusaders	Victoria Cougars (WCHL)
71	Gilles Lupien (D)	Canada	Toronto Toros	Montreal Red White and Blue (QMJHL)
72	Don McLean (D)	Canada	New England Whalers	Sudbury Wolves (OHA)
73	Steve Carlson (F)	United States	Minnesota Fighting Saints	Marquette Iron Rangers (USHL)
74	Bob Sirois (RW)	Canada	Houston Aeros	Montreal Red White and Blue (QMJHL)

==== Round 6 ====
#	Player	Nationality	WHA team	College/junior/club team
75	Robbie Watt (F)	Canada	Phoenix Roadrunners	Flin Flon Bombers (WCHL)
76	Harold Snepsts (D)	Canada	Indianapolis Racers	Edmonton Oil Kings (WCHL)
77	Joe Micheletti (D)	United States	Cincinnati Stingers	University of Minnesota (WCHA)
78	Ed Johnstone (RW)	Canada	Michigan Stags	Medicine Hat Tigers (WCHL)
79	Dave Lumley (F)	Canada	Vancouver Blazers	University of New Hampshire (ECAC)
80	Ray Maluta (D)	Canada	San Diego Mariners	Flin Flon Bombers (WCHL)
81	Dave Rooke (C)	Canada	Winnipeg Jets	Cornwall Royals (QMJHL)
82	Bernard Noreau (F)	Canada	Edmonton Oilers	Laval National (QMJHL)
83	Michel Bergeron (RW)	Canada	Quebec Nordiques	Sorel Black Hawks (QMJHL)
84	Emile DeMoissac (LW)	Canada	Chicago Cougars	New Westminster Bruins (WCHL)
85	Tom Lindskog (D)	Canada	Cleveland Crusaders	University of Michigan (WCHA)
86	Garth Malarchuk (G)	Canada	Toronto Toros	Calgary Centennials (WCHL)
87	Joe Rando (D)	United States	New England Whalers	University of New Hampshire (ECAC)
88	Al Hillier (C)	Canada	Minnesota Fighting Saints	Flin Flon Bombers (WCHL)
89	Ken Gassoff (C)	Canada	Houston Aeros	Medicine Hat Tigers (WCHL)

==== Round 7 ====
#	Player	Nationality	WHA team	College/junior/club team
90	Andy Spruce (LW)	Canada	Phoenix Roadrunners	London Knights (OHA)
91	Peter Roberts (C)	United States	Indianapolis Racers	St. Cloud Junior Blues (MidJHL)
92	John Sheridan (C)	United States	Indianapolis Racers (from Cincinnati)	University of Minnesota (WCHA)
93	Ron Pronchuk (D)	Canada	Michigan Stags	Brandon Wheat Kings (WCHL)
94	Mike Hobin (F)	Canada	Vancouver Blazers	Hamilton Red Wings (OHA)
95	Greg Holst (C)	Austria	San Diego Mariners	Kingston Canadians (OHA)
96	Bob Ferguson (C)	Canada	Winnipeg Jets	Cornwall Royals (QMJHL)
97	Tom Sundberg (F)	United States	Edmonton Oilers	St. Paul Vulcans (MidJHL)
98	Denis Carufel (LW)	Canada	Quebec Nordiques	Sorel Black Hawks (QMJHL)
99	John Shewchuk (F)	United States	Chicago Cougars	St. Paul Vulcans (MidJHL)
100	Harvey Stewart (G)	Canada	Cleveland Crusaders	Flin Flon Bombers (WCHL)
101	John Harper (RW)	Canada	Toronto Toros	Cornell University (ECAC)
102	Brian Walsh (RW)	United States	New England Whalers	University of Notre Dame (WCHA)
103	Jack Carlson (F)	United States	Minnesota Fighting Saints	Marquette Iron Rangers (USHL)
104	Murray Beck (C)	Canada	Houston Aeros	New Westminster Bruins (WCHL)

==== Round 8 ====
#	Player	Nationality	WHA team	College/junior/club team
105	Steve Short (D)	United States	Phoenix Roadrunners	St. Paul Vulcans (MidJHL)
106	Tom Price (D)	Canada	Indianapolis Racers	Ottawa 67's (OHA)
107	Mark Toulet	Canada	Indianapolis Racers (from Cincinnati)	University of Moncton (CIAU)
108	Paul Touzin (G)	Canada	Michigan Stags	Shawinigan Dynamos (QMJHL)
109	Mario Faubert (D)	Canada	Vancouver Blazers	St. Louis University (CCHA)
110	Mike McKegney (F)	Canada	San Diego Mariners	Kitchener Rangers (OHA)
111	John Duncan (D)	Canada	Winnipeg Jets	Cornwall Royals (QMJHL)
112	Cam Botting (RW)	Canada	Edmonton Oilers	Niagara Falls Flyers (SOJHL)
113	Claude Dupuis (LW)	Canada	Quebec Nordiques	Laval National (QMJHL)
114	Mark Trivett (F)	Canada	Chicago Cougars	Cornwall Royals (QMJHL)
115	Steve Colp (C)	Canada	Cleveland Crusaders	Michigan Americans (SOJHL)
116	Joe McNeil (F)	Canada	Toronto Toros	St. Francis Xavier University
117	John Nazar (LW)	Canada	New England Whalers	Cornwall Royals (QMJHL)
118	Rick Moore (F)	Canada	Minnesota Fighting Saints	Montreal Red White and Blue (QMJHL)
119	Jerry Badiuk (D)	Canada	Houston Aeros	Kitchener Rangers (OHA)

==== Round 9 ====
#	Player	Nationality	WHA team	College/junior/club team
120	John Taft (D)	United States	Phoenix Roadrunners	University of Wisconsin (WCHA)
121	Michel Dion (G)	Canada	Indianapolis Racers	Montreal Red White and Blue (QMJHL)
122	Dave Bossy (D)	Canada	Cincinnati Stingers	University of Notre Dame (WCHA)
123	Terry Casey (RW)	Canada	Michigan Stags	St. Catharines Black Hawks (OHA)
124	John Held (D)	Canada	Vancouver Blazers	London Knights (OHA)
125	Brian Bye (C)	Canada	San Diego Mariners	Kitchener Rangers (OHA)
126	Wayne Wilhelm (G)	Canada	Winnipeg Jets	Brandon Wheat Kings (WCHL)
127	Marty Mathews (F)	Canada	Edmonton Oilers	Flin Flon Bombers (WCHL)
128	Mario Lessard (G)	Canada	Quebec Nordiques	Sherbrooke Castors (QMJHL)
129	Bob Chase (F)	Canada	Chicago Cougars	Cornwall Royals (QMJHL)
130	Jack Brownschidle (D)	United States	Cleveland Crusaders	University of Notre Dame (WCHA)
131	Jack Davies (F)	Canada	Toronto Toros	Thunder Bay Hurricanes (MJHL)
132	Warren Miller (F)	United States	New England Whalers	University of Minnesota (WCHA)
133	Don Dufek (F)	United States	Minnesota Fighting Saints	University of Michigan (WCHA)
134	Jan Kascak (D)	Canada	Houston Aeros	St. Louis University (CCHA)

==== Round 10 ====
#	Player	Nationality	WHA team	College/junior/club team
135	Dan Mandryk (F)	Canada	Phoenix Roadrunners	Calgary Centennials (WCHL)
136	Kevin Erickson (G)	Canada	Indianapolis Racers	Calgary Centennials (WCHL)
137	Jack Patterson (F)	Canada	Indianapolis Racers (from Cincinnati)	Kamloops Chiefs (WCHL)
138	Eddie Mio (G)	Canada	Vancouver Blazers	Colorado College (WCHA)
139	Mike Wanchuk (RW)	Canada	Winnipeg Jets	Regina Pats (WCHL)
140	Willie Friesen (LW)	Canada	Edmonton Oilers	Swift Current Broncos (WCHL)
141	Claude Arvisais (C)	Canada	Quebec Nordiques	Shawinigan Dynamos (QMJHL)
142	Darrell Traer	Canada	Chicago Cougars	Thunder Bay Hurricanes (MJHL)
143	Serge Gamelin (RW)	Canada	Cleveland Crusaders	Sorel Black Hawks (QMJHL)
144	Bill Hassard (LW)	Canada	Toronto Toros	Wexford Raiders (OPJHL)
145	Tony White (F)	Canada	New England Whalers	Kitchener Rangers (OHA)
146	Reg Duncombe	Canada	Minnesota Fighting Saints	New Westminster Bruins (WCHL)
147	Ron Wilson (D)	United States	Houston Aeros	Providence College (ECAC)

==== Round 11 ====
#	Player	Nationality	WHA team	College/junior/club team
148	Chuck Luksa (D)	Canada	Phoenix Roadrunners	University of Toronto (OUAA)
149	Don Wheldon (D)	United States	Indianapolis Racers	London Knights (OHA)
150	Gary Sargent (D)	United States	Indianapolis Racers (from Cincinnati)	Fargo-Moorhead Sugar Kings (MidJHL)
151	Dave Groulx (F)	Canada	Michigan Stags	Cornell University (ECAC)
152	Jim Miller (W)	Canada	Vancouver Blazers	University of Denver (WCHA)
153	Firmin Royer (C)	Canada	San Diego Mariners	Sorel Black Hawks (QMJHL)
154	John Memryk (G)	Canada	Winnipeg Jets	Winnipeg Clubs (WCHL)
155	Greg Steel (D)	Canada	Indianapolis Racers (from Edmonton)	Calgary Centennials (WCHL)
156	Jim Murray (G)	United States	Chicago Cougars	Michigan Americans (SOJHL)
157	Glen McLeod (D)	Canada	Cleveland Crusaders	Sudbury Wolves (OHA)
158	Robbie Moore (G)	Canada	New England Whalers	Michigan Americans (SOJHL)
159	Robin Larson (D)	United States	Minnesota Fighting Saints	University of Minnesota (WCHA)
160	Bob Ferriter (LW)	United States	Houston Aeros	Boston College (ECAC)

==== Round 12 ====
#	Player	Nationality	WHA team	College/junior/club team
161	Marc Gaudreault (D)	Canada	Phoenix Roadrunners	Lake Superior State University (CCHA)
162	Pierre David (D)	Canada	Indianapolis Racers	Sorel Black Hawks (QMJHL)
163	Scott Mabley (D)	Canada	Indianapolis Racers (from Cincinnati)	Sault Ste. Marie Greyhounds (OHA)
164	John Riley (D)	Canada	Michigan Stags	Windsor Spitfires (SOJHL)
165	Dave Otness (W)	United States	Vancouver Blazers	University of Wisconsin (WCHA)
166	Bob Elinesky (D)	Canada	San Diego Mariners	Chatham Maroons (SOJHL)
167	Marcel Dumais (C)	Canada	Winnipeg Jets	Sherbrooke Castors (QMJHL)
168	Russ Hall (D)	Canada	Indianapolis Racers (from Edmonton)	Winnipeg Clubs (WCHL)
169	Michel Dubois (D)	Canada	Chicago Cougars	Chicoutimi Sagueneens (QMJHL)
170	Doug Allan (G)	Canada	Cleveland Crusaders	New Westminster Bruins (WCHL)
171	Cliff Cox (F)	Canada	New England Whalers	University of New Hampshire (ECAC)
172	Joe Baker (D)	United States	Minnesota Fighting Saints	St. Paul Vulcans (MidJHL)
173	John McMorrow (F)	United States	Houston Aeros	Providence College (ECAC)

==== Round 13 ====
#	Player	Nationality	WHA team	College/junior/club team
174	Kim Gellert (C)	Canada	Phoenix Roadrunners	Lake Superior State University (CCHA)
175	Graham Hall (F)	Canada	Indianapolis Racers	Wexford Raiders (OPJHL)
176	Bill Best (LW)	Canada	Indianapolis Racers (from Cincinnati)	Sudbury Wolves (OHA)
177	Walt Kyle (C)	United States	Vancouver Blazers	Waterloo Black Hawks (USHL)
178	Mitch Giroux (RW)	Canada	San Diego Mariners	Guelph Biltmore Mad Hatters (SOJHL)
179	Mike St. Cyr (D)	Canada	Indianapolis Racers (from Edmonton)	Kitchener Rangers (OHA)
180	Reggie Lemelin (G)	Canada	Chicago Cougars	Sherbrooke Castors (QMJHL)
181	Gordon Stewart (F)	Canada	Cleveland Crusaders	Kamloops Chiefs (WCHL)
182	Dave Staffen (F)	Canada	New England Whalers	Ottawa 67's (OHA)
183	Tony Dorn (D)	United States	Minnesota Fighting Saints	Three Rivers Dukes
184	Craig Norwich (D)	United States	Houston Aeros	University of Wisconsin (WCHA)

==== Round 14 ====
#	Player	Nationality	WHA team	College/junior/club team
185	Ron Hawkshaw (F)	Canada	Phoenix Roadrunners	University of Waterloo (OUAA)
186	Rod Tordoff (D)	Canada	Indianapolis Racers	Swift Current Broncos (WCHL)
187	Doug Counter (D)	Canada	Indianapolis Racers (from Cincinnati)	Aurora Tigers (OPJHL)
188	Bob Blanchet (G)	Canada	San Diego Mariners	Kitchener Rangers (OHA)
189	Mitch Babin (F)	Canada	Indianapolis Racers (from Edmonton)	North Bay Trappers (OPJHL)
190	Peter Tighe (D)	Canada	New England Whalers	London Knights (OHA)
191	Reed Larson (D)	United States	Minnesota Fighting Saints	Minnesota Junior Stars (MidJHL)
192	Kevin MacDonald (D)	Canada	Houston Aeros	Bowling Green State University (CCHA)

==== Round 15 ====
#	Player	Nationality	WHA team	College/junior/club team
193	Yves Plouffe (D)	Canada	Indianapolis Racers	Sorel Black Hawks (QMJHL)
194	Jim Chicoyne (D)	Canada	Indianapolis Racers (from Edmonton)	Brandon Wheat Kings (WCHL)
195	Brian Durocher (G)	United States	New England Whalers	Springfield Olympics (NEJHL)
196	Kym Yackel (W)	United States	Minnesota Fighting Saints	South St. Paul (Minn. H.S.)
197	Ian MacPhee (RW)	Canada	Houston Aeros	Swift Current Broncos (WCHL)

==== Round 16 ====
#	Player	Nationality	WHA team	College/junior/club team
198	Brian Barker (RW)	Canada	Indianapolis Racers	Sorel Black Hawks (QMJHL)
199	Colin Ahern (C)	United States	New England Whalers	Tyngsboro Huskies
200	Dana Decker (LW)	United States	Minnesota Fighting Saints	Michigan Americans (SOJHL)
201	Don Hay (RW)	Canada	Houston Aeros	New Westminster Bruins (WCHL)

==== Round 17 ====
#	Player	Nationality	WHA team	College/junior/club team
202	Rick Fraser (D)	Canada	Indianapolis Racers	Oshawa Generals (OHA)
203	Dwane Byers (F)	Canada	New England Whalers	Sherbrooke Castors (QMJHL)
204	John Rothstein (RW)	United States	Minnesota Fighting Saints	Grand Rapids Jrs.

==== Round 18 ====
#	Player	Nationality	WHA team	College/junior/club team
205	Larry Jacques (RW)	Canada	Indianapolis Racers	Ottawa 67's (OHA)

==== Round 19 ====
#	Player	Nationality	WHA team	College/junior/club team
206	Bob Volpe (G)	Canada	Indianapolis Racers	Sudbury Wolves (OHA)
207	Tom Wynne (G)	Canada	Winnipeg Jets	Cornwall Royals (QMJHL)

== Draftees based on nationality ==
Rank	Country	Amount
	North America	236
1	Canada	185
2	United States	51
	Europe	1
3	Austria	1

== See also ==
- 1974 NHL amateur draft
- 1974–75 WHA season

Preceded by 1973 WHA amateur draft	WHA draft 1974	Succeeded by 1975 WHA amateur draft
