= 1974 NHL amateur draft =

1974 North American ice hockey draft

General information
- Date: May 28–30, 1974
- Location: NHL offices Montreal, Quebec, Canada

Overview
- 247 total selections in 25 rounds
- First selection: (Canada) Greg Joly (Washington Capitals)
- Hall of Famers: 3: LW Clark Gillies; C Bryan Trottier; D Mark Howe

The 1974 NHL amateur draft was the 12th draft for the National Hockey League. It was held via conference call at the NHL office in Montreal. In an effort to prevent the World Hockey Association (WHA) from poaching players, the draft was conducted early and in secret. This failed to prevent tampering as information leaked out via agents and other sources over the three days of the draft. As a statement of frustration at the slow, secretive conference call format, Buffalo general manager Punch Imlach claimed "Taro Tsujimoto" of the "Tokyo Katanas" of Japan using the 183rd overall pick. NHL officials immediately validated the selection, but weeks later Imlach admitted that Tsujimoto was a fabrication. The selection was ruled invalid by the NHL and removed from their records.

This also marked the first year the NHL allowed underage players to be signed, a move made in response to the WHA's similar practice the previous year.

The last active player in the NHL from this draft class was Mark Howe, who retired after the 1994–95 season.

== Selections by round ==
Below are listed the selections in the 1974 NHL amateur draft.

= NHL All-Star team ·	= NHL All-Star (Note: Players are identified as an All-Star if they were selected for the All-Star game at any time in their career.) ·	= NHL All-Star and NHL All-Star team ·	= Hall of Famers

=== Round one ===
#	Player	Nationality	NHL team	College/junior/club team
1	Greg Joly (D)	Canada	Washington Capitals	Regina Pats (WCHL)
2	Wilf Paiement (RW)	Canada	Kansas City Scouts	St. Catharines Black Hawks (OMJHL)
3	Rick Hampton (D)	Canada	California Golden Seals	St. Catharines Black Hawks (OMJHL)
4	Clark Gillies (F)	Canada	New York Islanders	Regina Pats (WCHL)
5	Cam Connor (F)	Canada	Montreal Canadiens (from Vancouver)^{1}	Flin Flon Bombers (WCHL)
6	Doug Hicks (D)	Canada	Minnesota North Stars	Flin Flon Bombers (WCHL)
7	Doug Risebrough (F)	Canada	Montreal Canadiens (from St. Louis)^{2}	Kitchener Rangers (OHA)
8	Pierre Larouche (F)	Canada	Pittsburgh Penguins	Sorel Éperviers (QMJHL)
9	Bill Lochead (F)	Canada	Detroit Red Wings	Oshawa Generals (OMJHL)
10	Rick Chartraw (D)	United States	Montreal Canadiens (from Atlanta)^{3}	Kitchener Rangers (OMJHL)
11	Lee Fogolin (D)	Canada/ United States	Buffalo Sabres	Oshawa Generals (OHA)
12	Mario Tremblay (F)	Canada	Montreal Canadiens (from Los Angeles)^{4}	Montreal Bleu Blanc Rouge (QMJHL)
13	Jack Valiquette (F)	Canada	Toronto Maple Leafs	Sault Ste. Marie Greyhounds (OMJHL)
14	Dave Maloney (D)	Canada	New York Rangers	Kitchener Rangers (OMJHL)
15	Gord McTavish (F)	Canada	Montreal Canadiens	Sudbury Wolves (OMJHL)
16	Grant Mulvey (F)	Canada	Chicago Black Hawks	Calgary Centennials (WCHL)
17	Ron Chipperfield (C)	Canada	California Golden Seals (from Philadelphia)^{5}	Brandon Wheat Kings (WCHL)
18	Don Larway (RW)	Canada	Boston Bruins	Swift Current Broncos (WCHL)

1. The Vancouver Canucks' first-round pick went to the Montreal Canadiens as the result of a trade on May 15, 1973 that sent Montreal's first-round pick (Bob Dailey) in 1973 NHL amateur draft to Vancouver in exchange for this pick.
2. The St. Louis Blues' first-round pick went to the Montreal Canadiens as the result of a trade on March 9, 1974 that sent Dave Gardner to St. Louis in exchange for this pick.
3. The Atlanta Flames' first-round pick went to the Montreal Canadiens as the result of a trade on May 29, 1973 that sent Chuck Arnason to Atlanta in exchange for this pick.
4. The Los Angeles Kings' first-round pick went to the Montreal Canadiens as the result of a trade on May 29, 1973 that sent Bob Murdoch and Randy Rota to Los Angeles in exchange for cash and this pick.
5. The Philadelphia Flyers' first-round pick went to the California Golden Seals as the result of a trade on May 24, 1974 that sent Reggie Leach to Philadelphia in exchange for Al MacAdam, Larry Wright and this pick.

=== Round two ===
#	Player	Nationality	NHL team	College/junior/club team
19	Mike Marson (LW)	Canada	Washington Capitals	Sudbury Wolves (OMJHL)
20	Glen Burdon (C)	Canada	Kansas City Scouts	Regina Pats (WCHL)
21	Bruce Affleck (D)	Canada	California Golden Seals	University of Denver (WCHA)
22	Bryan Trottier (C)	Canada	New York Islanders	Swift Current Broncos (WCHL)
23	Ron Sedlbauer (LW)	Canada	Vancouver Canucks	Kitchener Rangers (OMJHL)
24	Rich Nantais (LW)	Canada	Minnesota North Stars	Quebec Remparts (QMJHL)
25	Mark Howe (LW)	United States	Boston Bruins (from St.Louis)^{1}	Houston Aeros (WHA)
26	Bob Hess (D)	Canada	St. Louis Blues (from Pittsburgh)^{2}	New Westminster Bruins (WCHL)
27	Jacques Cossette (RW)	Canada	Pittsburgh Penguins	Sorel Eperviers (QMJHL)
28	Guy Chouinard (C)	Canada	Atlanta Flames	Quebec Remparts (QMJHL)
29	Danny Gare (RW)	Canada	Buffalo Sabres	Calgary Centennials (WCHL)
30	Gary MacGregor (C)	Canada	Montreal Canadiens (from Los Angeles)^{3}	Cornwall Royals (QMJHL)
31	Tiger Williams (LW)	Canada	Toronto Maple Leafs	Swift Current Broncos (WCHL)
32	Ron Greschner (D)	Canada	New York Rangers	New Westminster Bruins (WCHL)
33	Gilles Lupien (D)	Canada	Montreal Canadiens	Montreal Bleu Blanc Rouge (QMJHL)
34	Alain Daigle (RW)	Canada	Chicago Black Hawks	Trois-Rivières Draveurs (QMJHL)
35	Don McLean (D)	Canada	Philadelphia Flyers	Sudbury Wolves (OMJHL)
36	Peter Sturgeon (LW)	Canada	Boston Bruins	Kitchener Rangers (OMJHL)

1. The St. Louis Blues' second-round pick went to the Boston Bruins as the result of a trade on October 5, 1973 that sent Don Awrey to St. Louis in exchange for Jake Rathwell, cash and this pick.
2. The Pittsburgh Penguins' second-round pick went to the St. Louis Blues as the result of a trade on January 17, 1974 that sent Ab DeMarco Jr., Steve Durbano and Bob Kelly to St. Louis in exchange for Greg Polis, Bryan Watson and this pick.
3. The Los Angeles Kings' second-round pick went to the Montreal Canadiens as the result of a trade on August 22, 1972 that sent Terry Harper to Los Angeles in exchange for Los Angeles' third-round pick in the 1975 NHL amateur draft, a first-round pick in the 1976 NHL amateur draft and this pick.

=== Round three ===
#	Player	Nationality	NHL team	College/junior/club team
37	John Paddock (RW)	Canada	Washington Capitals	Brandon Wheat Kings (WCHL)
38	Bob Bourne (C)	Canada	Kansas City Scouts	Saskatoon Blades (WCHL)
39	Charlie Simmer (C)	Canada	California Golden Seals	Sault Ste. Marie Greyhounds (OMJHL)
40	Brad Anderson (C)	Canada	New York Islanders	Victoria Cougars (WCHL)
41	John Hughes (D)	Canada	Vancouver Canucks	Toronto Marlboros (OMJHL)
42	Pete LoPresti (G)	United States	Minnesota North Stars	University of Denver (WCHA)
43	Gordon Buynak (D)	United States	St. Louis Blues	Kingston Canadians (OMJHL)
44	Dan Mandryk (LW)	Canada	Detroit Red Wings (from Pittsburgh)^{1}	Calgary Centennials (WCHL)
45	Bill Evo (RW)	United States	Detroit Red Wings	Peterborough Petes (OMJHL)
46	Dick Spannbauer (D)	United States	Atlanta Flames	University of Minnesota (WCHA)
47	Michel Deziel (LW)	Canada	Buffalo Sabres	Sorel Eperviers (QMJHL)
48	Gary Sargent (D)	United States	Los Angeles Kings	Fargo Sugar Kings (MWJHL)
49	Per-Arne Alexandersson (C)	Sweden	Toronto Maple Leafs	Leksands IF (Sweden)
50	Jerry Holland (LW)	Canada	New York Rangers	Calgary Centennials (WCHL)
51	Marty Howe (D)	United States	Montreal Canadiens	Houston Aeros (WHA)
52	Bob Murray (D)	Canada	Chicago Black Hawks	Cornwall Royals (QMJHL)
53	Bob Sirois (RW)	Canada	Philadelphia Flyers	Montreal Bleu Blanc Rouge (QMJHL)
54	Tom Edur (D)	Canada	Boston Bruins	Cleveland Crusaders (WHA)

1. The Pittsburgh Penguins' third-round pick went to the Detroit Red Wings as the result of a trade on May 27, 1974 that sent Nelson Debenedet to Pittsburgh in exchange for Hank Nowak and this pick.

=== Round four ===
#	Player	Nationality	NHL team	College/junior/club team
55	Paul Nicholson (LW)	Canada	Washington Capitals	London Knights (OMJHL)
56	Roger Lemelin (D)	Canada	Kansas City Scouts	London Knights (OMJHL)
57	Tom Price (D)	Canada	California Golden Seals	Ottawa 67's (OMJHL)
58	Pat Ribble (D)	Canada	Atlanta Flames	Oshawa Generals (OMJHL)
59	Harold Snepsts (D)	Canada	Vancouver Canucks	Edmonton Oil Kings (WCHL)
60	Kim MacDougall (D)	Canada	Minnesota North Stars	Regina Pats (WCHL)
61	Barry Legge (D)	Canada	Montreal Canadiens (from St. Louis)^{1}	Winnipeg Clubs (WCHL)
62	Mario Faubert (D)	Canada	Pittsburgh Penguins	Saint Louis University (CCHA)
63	Michel Bergeron (RW)	Canada	Detroit Red Wings	Sorel Eperviers (QMJHL)
64	Cam Botting (RW)	Canada	Atlanta Flames	Niagara Falls Flyers (SOJHL)
65	Paul McIntosh (D)	Canada	Buffalo Sabres	Peterborough Petes (OMJHL)
66	Brad Winton (C)	Canada	Los Angeles Kings	Toronto Marlboros (OMJHL)
67	Peter Driscoll (LW)	Canada	Toronto Maple Leafs	Kingston Canadians (OMJHL)
68	Boyd Anderson (LW)	Canada	New York Rangers	Medicine Hat Tigers (WCHL)
69	Mike McKegney (RW)	Canada	Montreal Canadiens	Kitchener Rangers (OMJHL)
70	Terry Ruskowski (C)	Canada	Chicago Black Hawks	Swift Current Broncos (WCHL)
71	Randy Andreachuk (RW)	Canada	Philadelphia Flyers	Kamloops Chiefs (WCHL)
72	Bill Reed (D)	Canada	Boston Bruins	Sault Ste. Marie Greyhounds (OMJHL)

1. The St. Louis Blues' fourth-round pick went to the Montreal Canadiens as the result of a trade on May 27, 1974 that sent Rick Wilson and Montreal's fifth-round pick in 1974 NHL Amateur Draft to St. Louis in exchange for future considerations (Glen Sather) and this pick.

=== Round five ===
#	Player	Nationality	NHL team	College/junior/club team
73	Jack Patterson (C)	Canada	Washington Capitals	Kamloops Chiefs (WCHL)
74	Mark Lomenda (RW)	Canada	Kansas City Scouts	Victoria Cougars (WCHL)
75	Jim Warden (G)	United States	California Golden Seals	Michigan Technological University (WCHA)
76	Carlo Torresan (D)	Canada	New York Islanders	Sorel Eperviers (QMJHL)
77	Mike Rogers (C)	Canada	Vancouver Canucks	Calgary Centennials (WCHL)
78	Ron Ashton (D)	Canada	Minnesota North Stars	Saskatoon Blades (WCHL)
79	Mike Zuke (C)	Canada	St. Louis Blues	Michigan Technological University (WCHA)
80	Bruce Aberhart (G)	Canada	Pittsburgh Penguins	London Knights (OMJHL)
81	John Taft (D)	United States	Detroit Red Wings	University of Wisconsin (WCHA)
82	Jerry Badiuk (D)	Canada	Atlanta Flames	Kitchener Rangers (OMJHL)
83	Garry Lariviere (D)	Canada	Buffalo Sabres	St. Catharines Black Hawks (OMJHL)
84	Paul Evans (C)	Canada	Los Angeles Kings	Kitchener Rangers (OMJHL)
85	Mike Palmateer (G)	Canada	Toronto Maple Leafs	Toronto Marlboros (OMJHL)
86	Dennis Olmstead (C)	Canada	New York Rangers	University of Wisconsin (WCHA)
87	Don Wheldon (D)	United States	St. Louis Blues (from Montreal)^{1}	London Knights (OMJHL)
88	Dave Logan (D)	Canada	Chicago Black Hawks	Laval National (QMJHL)
89	Dennis Sobchuk (C)	Canada	Philadelphia Flyers	Regina Pats (WCHL)
90	Jamie Bateman (LW)	Canada	Boston Bruins	Quebec Remparts (QMJHL)

1. The Montreal Canadiens' fifth-round pick went to the St. Louis Blues as the result of a trade on May 27, 1974 that sent St. Louis' fourth-round picks in 1974 NHL Amateur Draft and future considerations (Glen Sather) to Montreal in exchange for Rick Wilson and this pick.

=== Round six ===
#	Player	Nationality	NHL team	College/junior/club team
91	Brian Kinsella (C)	Canada	Washington Capitals	Oshawa Generals (OMJHL)
92	John Shewchuk (C)	United States	Kansas City Scouts	St. Paul Vulcans (MWJHL)
93	Tom Sundberg (C)	United States	California Golden Seals	St. Paul Vulcans (MWJHL)
94	Sid Prysunka (LW)	Canada	New York Islanders	New Westminster Bruins (WCHL)
95	Andy Spruce (LW)	Canada	Vancouver Canucks	London Knights (OMJHL)
96	John Sheridan (C)	United States	Minnesota North Stars	University of Minnesota (WCHA)
97	Mike Thompson (D)	Canada	St. Louis Blues	Victoria Cougars (WCHL)
98	Buzz Schneider (LW)	United States	Pittsburgh Penguins	University of Minnesota (WCHA)
99	Don Dufek (LW)	United States	Detroit Red Wings	University of Michigan (WCHA)
100	Bill Moen (G)	United States	Atlanta Flames	University of Minnesota (WCHA)
101	Dave Given (RW)	United States	Buffalo Sabres	Brown University (ECAC)
102	Marty Matthews (LW)	Canada	Los Angeles Kings	Flin Flon Bombers (WCHL)
103	Bill Hassard (C)	Canada	Toronto Maple Leafs	Wexford Warriors (MetJHL)
104	Ed Johnstone (RW)	Canada	New York Rangers	Medicine Hat Tigers (WCHL)
105	John Stewart (C)	Canada	Montreal Canadiens	Bowling Green University (CCHA)
106	Bob Volpe (G)	Canada	Chicago Black Hawks	Sudbury Wolves (OMJHL)
107	Willie Friesen (LW)	Canada	Philadelphia Flyers	Swift Current Broncos (WCHL)
108	Bill Best (LW)	Canada	Boston Bruins	Sudbury Wolves (OMJHL)

=== Round seven ===
#	Player	Nationality	NHL team	College/junior/club team
109	Garth Malarchuk (G)	Canada	Washington Capitals	Calgary Centennials (WCHL)
110	Mike Boland (D)	Canada	Kansas City Scouts	Sault Ste. Marie Greyhounds (OMJHL)
111	Tom Anderson (D)	United States	California Golden Seals	St. Paul Vulcans (MWJHL)
112	Dave Langevin (D)	United States	New York Islanders	University of Minnesota Duluth (WCHA)
113	Jim Clarke (D)	Canada	Vancouver Canucks	Toronto Marlboros (OMJHL)
114	Dave Heitz (G)	United States	Minnesota North Stars	Fargo Sugar Kings (MWJHL)
115	Terry Casey (RW)	Canada	St. Louis Blues	St. Catharines Black Hawks (OMJHL)
116	Rob Laird (LW)	Canada	Pittsburgh Penguins	Regina Pats (WCHL)
117	Jack Carlson (LW)	United States	Detroit Red Wings	Marquette Iron Rangers (USHL)
118	Peter Brown (D)	United States	Atlanta Flames	Boston University (ECAC)
119	Bernard Noreau (RW)	Canada	Buffalo Sabres	Laval National (QMJHL)
120	Harvey Stewart (G)	Canada	Los Angeles Kings	Flin Flon Bombers (WCHL)
121	Kevin Devine (LW)	Canada	Toronto Maple Leafs	Toronto Marlboros (OMJHL)
122	John Memryk (G)	Canada	New York Rangers	Winnipeg Clubs (WCHL)
123	Joe Micheletti (D)	United States	Montreal Canadiens	University of Minnesota (WCHA)
124	Eddie Mio (G)	Canada	Chicago Black Hawks	Colorado College (WCHA)
125	Rejean Lemelin (G)	Canada	Philadelphia Flyers	Sherbrooke Castors (QMJHL)
126	Ray Maluta (D)	Canada	Boston Bruins	Flin Flon Bombers (WCHL)

=== Round eight ===
#	Player	Nationality	NHL team	College/junior/club team
127	John Nazar (LW)	Canada	Washington Capitals	Cornwall Royals (QMJHL)
128	Jim McCabe (C)	Canada	California Golden Seals	Welland Sabres (SOJAHL)
129	Dave Inkpen (D)	Canada	New York Islanders	Edmonton Oil Kings (WCHL)
130	Robbie Watt (LW)	Canada	Vancouver Canucks	Flin Flon Bombers (WCHL)
131	Roland Eriksson (C)	Sweden	Minnesota North Stars	IF Tunabro (Sweden)
132	Rod Tordoff (D)	Canada	St. Louis Blues	Swift Current Broncos (WCHL)
133	Larry Finck (D)	Canada	Pittsburgh Penguins	St. Catharines Black Hawks (OMJHL)
134	Greg Steel (D)	Canada	Detroit Red Wings	Calgary Centennials (WCHL)
135	Tom Lindskog (D)	Canada	Atlanta Flames	University of Michigan (WCHA)
136	Charles Constantin (LW)	Canada	Buffalo Sabres	Quebec Remparts (QMJHL)
137	John Held (D)	Canada	Los Angeles Kings	London Knights (OMJHL)
138	Kevin Kemp (D)	Canada	Toronto Maple Leafs	Ottawa 67's (OMJHL)
139	Greg Holst (C)	Canada	New York Rangers	Kingston Canadians (OMJHL)
140	Jamie Hislop (RW)	Canada	Montreal Canadiens	University of New Hampshire (ECAC)
141	Mike St. Cyr (D)	Canada	Chicago Black Hawks	Kitchener Rangers (OMJHL)
142	Steve Short (LW)	United States	Philadelphia Flyers	Minnesota Junior Stars (MWJHL)
143	Daryl Drader (D)	Canada	Boston Bruins	University of North Dakota (WCHA)

=== Round nine ===
#	Player	Nationality	NHL team	College/junior/club team
144	Kelvin Erickson (G)	Canada	Washington Capitals	Calgary Centennials (WCHL)
145	Brian Kuruliak (LW)	Canada	Kansas City Scouts	North Bay Trappers (OPJHL)
146	Jim Foubister (G)	Canada	New York Islanders	Victoria Cougars (WCHL)
147	Marc Gaudreault (D)	Canada	Vancouver Canucks	Lake Superior State University (CCHA)
148	Dave Staffen (C)	Canada	Minnesota North Stars	Ottawa 67's (OMJHL)
149	Paul Touzin (G)	Canada	St. Louis Blues	Shawinigan Dynamos (QMJHL)
150	Jim Chicoyne (D)	Canada	Pittsburgh Penguins	Brandon Wheat Kings (WCHL)
151	Glen McLeod (D)	Canada	Detroit Red Wings	Sudbury Wolves (OMJHL)
152	Larry Hopkins (LW)	Canada	Atlanta Flames	Oshawa Legionaires (MetJHL)
153	Rick Jodzio (LW)	Canada	Buffalo Sabres	Hamilton Fincups (OMJHL)
154	Mario Lessard (G)	Canada	Los Angeles Kings	Sherbrooke Castors (QMJHL)
155	Dave Syvret (D)	Canada	Toronto Maple Leafs	St. Catharines Black Hawks (OMJHL)
156	Claude Arvisais (C)	Canada	New York Rangers	Shawinigan Dynamos (QMJHL)
157	Gordon Stewart (C)	Canada	Montreal Canadiens	Kamloops Chiefs (WCHL)
158	Steve Colp (C)	Canada	Chicago Black Hawks	Michigan State University (WCHA)
159	Peter MacKenzie (D)	Canada	Philadelphia Flyers	St. Francis Xavier University (CIAU)
160	Pete Roberts (C)	United States	Boston Bruins	St. Cloud Junior Blues (MWJHL)

=== Round ten ===
#	Player	Nationality	NHL team	College/junior/club team
161	Tony White (LW)	Canada	Washington Capitals	Kitchener Rangers (OMJHL)
162	Denis Carufel (D)	Canada	Kansas City Scouts	Sorel Eperviers(QMJHL)
163	Bob Ferguson (C)	Canada	New York Islanders	Cornwall Royals (QMJHL)
164	Brian Andersen (D)	Canada	Minnesota North Stars	New Westminster Bruins (WCHL)
165	John Ahern (D)	United States	St. Louis Blues	Brown University (ECAC)
166	Rick Uhrich (RW)	Canada	Pittsburgh Penguins	Regina Pats (WCHL)
167	Louis Loranger (C)	Canada	Atlanta Flames	Shawinigan Dynamos (QMJHL)
168	Derek Smith (LW)	Canada	Buffalo Sabres	Ottawa 67's (OMJHL)
169	Derrick Emerson (RW)	Canada	Los Angeles Kings	Montreal Bleu Blanc Rouge (QMJHL)
170	Andy Stoesz (G)	Canada	Toronto Maple Leafs	Selkirk Steelers(MJHL)
171	Ken Dodd (LW)	Canada	New York Rangers	New Westminster Bruins (WCHL)
172	Chuck Luksa (D)	Canada	Montreal Canadiens	Kitchener Rangers (OMJHL)
173	Rick Fraser (D)	Canada	Chicago Black Hawks	Oshawa Generals (OMJHL)
174	Marcel Labrosse (C)	Canada	Philadelphia Flyers	Shawinigan Dynamos (QMJHL)
175	Peter Waselovich (G)	United States	Boston Bruins	University of North Dakota (WCHA)

=== Round eleven ===
#	Player	Nationality	NHL team	College/junior/club team
176	Ron Pronchuk (D)	Canada	Washington Capitals	Brandon Wheat Kings (WCHL)
177	Soren Johansson (C)	Sweden	Kansas City Scouts	Djurgårdens IF (Sweden)
178	Murray Fleck (D)	Canada	New York Islanders	Estevan Bruins (SJHL)
179	Duane Bray (D)	Canada	Minnesota North Stars	Flin Flon Bombers (WCHL)
180	Mitch Babin (C)	Canada	St. Louis Blues	North Bay Trappers (OPJHL)
181	Serge Gamelin (RW)	Canada	Pittsburgh Penguins	Sorel Eperviers (QMJHL)
182	Randy Montgomery (LW)	Canada	Atlanta Flames	Welland Sabres (SOJHL)
183	~~Taro Tsujimoto (C)~~	~~Japan~~	~~Buffalo Sabres~~	~~Tokyo Katanas (JIHL)~~
Pick 183 was later revised to "invalid claim" by the NHL after Tsujimoto was revealed to be a nonexistent character.
184	Jacques Locas (C)	Canada	Los Angeles Kings	Quebec Remparts (QMJHL)
185	Marty Feschuk (D)	Canada	Toronto Maple Leafs	Saskatoon Blades (WCHL)
186	Ralph Krentz (LW)	Canada	New York Rangers	Brandon Wheat Kings (WCHL)
187	Cliff Cox (C)	Canada	Montreal Canadiens	University of New Hampshire (ECAC)
188	Jean Bernier (D)	Canada	Chicago Black Hawks	Shawinigan Dynamos (QMJHL)
189	Scott Jessee (RW)	United States	Philadelphia Flyers	Michigan Technological University (WCHA)

=== Round twelve ===
#	Player	Nationality	NHL team	College/junior/club team
190	Dave McKee (RW)	Canada	Washington Capitals	Oshawa Generals (OMJHL)
191	Mats Ulander (LW)	Sweden	Kansas City Scouts	Bodens BK (Sweden)
192	Dave Rooke (D)	Canada	New York Islanders	Cornwall Royals (QMJHL)
193	Don Hay (RW)	Canada	Minnesota North Stars	New Westminster Bruins (WCHL)
194	Doug Allan (G)	Canada	St. Louis Blues	New Westminster Bruins (WCHL)
195	Rich Perron (D)	Canada	Pittsburgh Penguins	Quebec Remparts (QMJHL)
196	Bob Geoffrion (LW)	Canada	Buffalo Sabres	Cornwall Royals (QMJHL)
197	Lindsay Thomson (C)	Canada	Los Angeles Kings	University of Denver (WCHA)
198	Larry Jacques (RW)	Canada	New York Rangers	Ottawa 67's (OMJHL)
199	Dave Lumley (RW)	Canada	Montreal Canadiens	University of New Hampshire (ECAC)
200	Dwayne Byers (RW)	Canada	Chicago Black Hawks	Sherbrooke Castors (QMJHL)
201	Richard Guay (G)	Canada	Philadelphia Flyers	Chicoutimi Saguenéens (QMJHL)

=== Round thirteen ===
#	Player	Nationality	NHL team	College/junior/club team
202	Scott Mabley (D)	Canada	Washington Capitals	Sault Ste. Marie Greyhounds (OMJHL)
203	Ed Pizunski (D)	Canada	Kansas City Scouts	Peterborough Petes (OMJHL)
204	Neil Smith (D)	Canada	New York Islanders	Brockville Braves (CJHL)
205	Brian Holderness (G)	Canada	Minnesota North Stars	Saskatoon Blades (WCHL)
206	Rick Hindmarch (RW)	Canada	Pittsburgh Penguins	University of Calgary (CWUAA)
207	Craig Brickley (C)	United States	Los Angeles Kings	University of Pennsylvania (ECAC)
208	Tom Gastle (LW)	Canada	New York Rangers	Peterborough Petes (OMJHL)
209	Mike Hobin (C)	Canada	Montreal Canadiens	Hamilton Fincups (OMJHL)
210	Glen Ing (RW)	Canada	Chicago Black Hawks	Victoria Cougars (WCHL)
211	Brad Morrow (D)	United States	Philadelphia Flyers	University of Minnesota (WCHA)

=== Round fourteen ===
#	Player	Nationality	NHL team	College/junior/club team
212	Bernard Plante (LW)	Canada	Washington Capitals	Trois-Rivières Draveurs (QMJHL)
213	Willie Wing (RW)	Canada	Kansas City Scouts	Hamilton Fincups (OMJHL)
214	Stefan Persson (D)	Sweden	New York Islanders	Brynäs IF (Sweden)
215	Frank Taylor (D)	Canada	Minnesota North Stars	Brandon Wheat Kings (WCHL)
216	Bill Davis (D)	Canada	Pittsburgh Penguins	Colgate University (ECAC)
217	Brad Kuglin (LW)	Canada	Los Angeles Kings	University of Pennsylvania (ECAC)
218	Eric Brubacher (C)	Canada	New York Rangers	Kingston Canadians (OMJHL)
219	Craig Arvidson (LW)	United States	Philadelphia Flyers	University of Minnesota Duluth (WCHA)

=== Round fifteen ===
#	Player	Nationality	NHL team	College/junior/club team
220	Jacques Chiasson (RW)	Canada	Washington Capitals	Drummondville Rangers (QMJHL)
221	Dave Otness (C)	United States	New York Islanders	University of Wisconsin (WCHA)
222	Jeff Hymanson (D)	United States	Minnesota North Stars	St. Cloud Junior Blues (MWJHL)
223	James Mathers (D)	United States	Pittsburgh Penguins	Northeastern University (ECAC)
224	Russ Hall (RW)	Canada	New York Rangers	Winnipeg Clubs (WCHL)

=== Round sixteen ===
#	Player	Nationality	NHL team	College/junior/club team
225	Bill Bell (LW)	Canada	Washington Capitals	Regina Pats (WCHL)
226	Jim Murray (D)	Canada	New York Islanders	Michigan Technological University (WCHA)
227	Bill Kriski (G)	Canada	New York Rangers	Winnipeg Clubs (WCHL)

=== Round seventeen ===
#	Player	Nationality	NHL team	College/junior/club team
228	Bob Blanchet (G)	Canada	Washington Capitals	Kitchener Rangers (OMJHL)
229	Mike Dibble (G)	United States	New York Islanders	University of Wisconsin (WCHA)
230	Kevin Treacy (RW)	Canada	New York Rangers	Cornwall Royals (QMJHL)

=== Round eighteen ===
#	Player	Nationality	NHL team	College/junior/club team
231	Johnny Bower Jr. (D)	Canada	Washington Capitals	Downsview Beavers (OPJHL)
232	Brian Bye (LW)	Canada	New York Islanders	Kitchener Rangers (OMJHL)
233	Ken Gassoff (C)	Canada	New York Rangers	Medicine Hat Tigers (WCHL)

=== Round nineteen ===
#	Player	Nationality	NHL team	College/junior/club team
234	Yves Plouffe (D)	Canada	Washington Capitals	Sorel Eperviers (QMJHL)
235	Martti Jarkko (C)	Finland	New York Islanders	Tappara Tampere (Finland)
236	Cliff Bast (D)	Canada	New York Rangers	Medicine Hat Tigers (WCHL)

=== Round twenty ===
#	Player	Nationality	NHL team	College/junior/club team
237	Terry Bozack (D)	Canada	Washington Capitals	Pembroke Lumber Kings (CJAHL)
238	Ron Phillips (D)	Canada	New York Islanders	St. Catharines Black Hawks (OMJHL)
239	Jim Mayer (RW)	Canada	New York Rangers	Michigan Technological University (WCHA)

=== Round twenty-one ===
#	Player	Nationality	NHL team	College/junior/club team
240	Gord Cole (LW)	Canada	Washington Capitals	Brandon Wheat Kings (WCHL)
241	Warren Miller (RW)	United States	New York Rangers	University of Minnesota (WCHA)

=== Round twenty-two ===
#	Player	Nationality	NHL team	College/junior/club team
242	Mike Cosentino (C)	Canada	Washington Capitals	Hamilton Fincups (OMJHL)
243	Kevin Walker (D)	Canada	New York Rangers	Cornell University (ECAC)

=== Round twenty-three ===
#	Player	Nationality	NHL team	College/junior/club team
244	John Duncan (D)	Canada	Washington Capitals	Cornwall Royals (QMJHL)
245	Jim Warner (RW)	United States	New York Rangers	Minnesota Junior Stars (MWJHL)

=== Round twenty-four ===
#	Player	Nationality	NHL team	College/junior/club team
246	Barry Kerfoot (RW)	Canada	Washington Capitals	Smiths Falls Bears (CJAHL)

=== Round twenty-five ===
#	Player	Nationality	NHL team	College/junior/club team
247	Ron Poole (C)	Canada	Washington Capitals	Kamloops Chiefs (WCHL)

= NHL All-Star team ·	= NHL All-Star ·	= NHL All-Star and NHL All-Star team ·	= Hall of Famers

== Draftees based on nationality ==
Rank	Country	Amount
	North America	240
1	Canada	201
2	United States	39
	Europe	6
3	Sweden	5
T4	Finland	1
	~~Asia~~	~~1~~
~~T4~~	~~Japan~~	~~1~~

The Asia / Japan selection was later invalidated, once Buffalo Sabres General Manager Punch Imlach admitted that "Taro Tsujimoto" of Japan, a low selection (eleventh round, 183rd overall), was a fabrication in answer to his frustration over the format of the 1974 draft.

== See also ==
- 1974–75 NHL season
- 1974 NHL expansion draft
- 1974 WHA amateur draft
- List of NHL players
