= Pat Price (ice hockey) =

Canadian ice hockey player (born 1955)

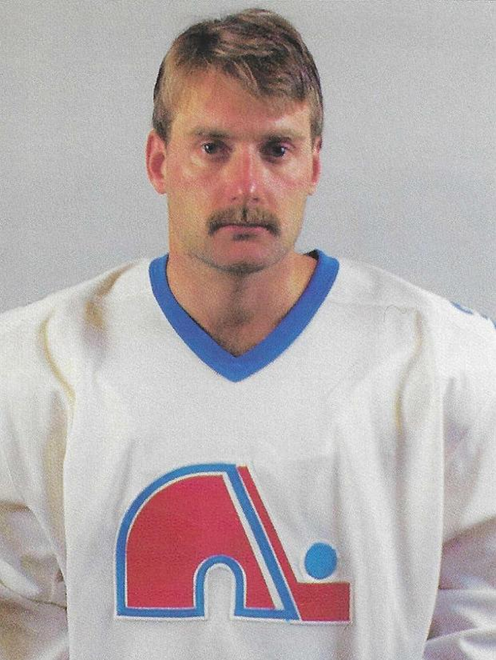
- Price in 1985 photo
- Born: March 24, 1955 (age 71) Nelson, British Columbia, Canada
- Height: 6 ft 2 in (188 cm)
- Weight: 195 lb (88 kg; 13 st 13 lb)
- Position: Defence
- Shot: Left
- Played for: Vancouver Blazers; New York Islanders; Edmonton Oilers; Pittsburgh Penguins; Quebec Nordiques; New York Rangers; Minnesota North Stars
- NHL draft: 11th overall, 1975; New York Islanders
- WHA draft: 1st overall, 1974; Vancouver Blazers
- Playing career: 1974–1988

Shaun Patrick Price (born March 24, 1955) is a Canadian former professional ice hockey player who played in the World Hockey Association (WHA) for the Vancouver Blazers and the National Hockey League (NHL) for the New York Islanders, Edmonton Oilers, Pittsburgh Penguins, Quebec Nordiques, New York Rangers and Minnesota North Stars. He reached the NHL playoff semifinals four times, three times with the Islanders and once with the Nordiques.

== Early life ==
Born in Nelson, British Columbia, Price was a highly touted junior star with the Saskatoon Blades of the Western Canada Hockey League (WCHL), with 95 points, despite being a defenseman, in the 1973–74 WCHL season. He was a member of the WCHL All-Star Team in 1974.

== Career ==
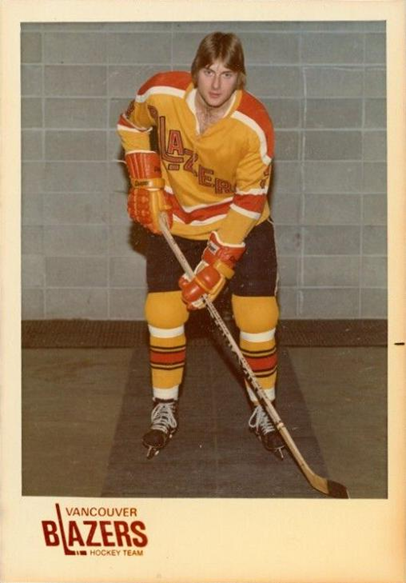
1974-75 photo of Price for Vancouver Blazers

In the 1974 WHA Amateur Draft, Price was drafted first overall by the Vancouver Blazers. The WHA had trouble holding onto its draft picks, who often went to the more established NHL teams, but the Blazers landed the untested rookie with a contract offer of $1.3 million ($8.1 million today).

Price did not meet the Blazers' expectations, with 34 points in the 1974–75 WHA season, and he went to the NHL after being drafted 11th overall by the New York Islanders in the 1975 NHL Amateur Draft. Price spent most of that season in the minor leagues, as he learned the professional game.

Price became an NHL regular in 1976–77, and played three seasons with the Islanders before he was claimed by the Edmonton Oilers in the 1979 NHL Expansion Draft.

Despite the original expectation that he should be a scoring defenceman with Vancouver in his rookie season, Price grew to be a balanced professional, playing 726 total NHL games over 13 seasons, scoring 43 goals and having 218 assists before retiring in 1988.

After retiring, Price returned to his hometown of Nelson, British Columbia.

== Career statistics ==
			Regular season					Playoffs
Season	Team	League	GP	G	A	Pts	PIM	GP	G	A	Pts	PIM
1970–71	Saskatoon Blades	WCHL	66	2	16	18	56	5	0	3	3	2
1971–72	Saskatoon Blades	WCHL	66	10	48	58	85	8	0	3	3	25
1972–73	Saskatoon Blades	WCHL	67	12	56	68	134	16	4	17	21	24
1973–74	Saskatoon Blades	WCHL	68	27	68	95	147	6	3	4	7	13
1974–75	Vancouver Blazers	WHA	68	5	29	34	15	—	—	—	—	—
1975–76	New York Islanders	NHL	4	0	2	2	2	—	—	—	—	—
1975–76	Fort Worth Texans	CHL	72	6	44	50	119	—	—	—	—	—
1976–77	New York Islanders	NHL	71	3	22	25	25	10	0	1	1	2
1977–78	New York Islanders	NHL	52	2	10	12	27	5	0	1	1	2
1977–78	Rochester Americans	AHL	5	2	1	3	9	—	—	—	—	—
1978–79	New York Islanders	NHL	55	3	11	14	50	7	0	1	1	25
1979–80	Edmonton Oilers	NHL	75	11	21	32	134	3	0	0	0	11
1980–81	Edmonton Oilers	NHL	59	8	24	32	193	—	—	—	—	—
1980–81	Pittsburgh Penguins	NHL	13	0	10	10	33	5	1	1	2	21
1981–82	Pittsburgh Penguins	NHL	77	7	31	38	322	5	0	0	0	28
1982–83	Pittsburgh Penguins	NHL	38	1	11	12	104	—	—	—	—	—
1982–83	Quebec Nordiques	NHL	14	1	2	3	28	4	0	0	0	14
1983–84	Quebec Nordiques	NHL	72	3	25	28	188	9	1	0	1	10
1984–85	Quebec Nordiques	NHL	68	1	26	27	118	17	0	4	4	51
1985–86	Quebec Nordiques	NHL	54	3	13	16	82	3	0	1	1	4
1986–87	Quebec Nordiques	NHL	47	0	6	6	81	—	—	—	—	—
1986–87	Fredericton Express	AHL	7	0	0	0	14	—	—	—	—	—
1986–87	New York Rangers	NHL	13	0	2	2	49	6	0	1	1	27
1987–88	Minnesota North Stars	NHL	14	0	2	2	20	—	—	—	—	—
1987–88	Kalamazoo Wings	IHL	2	1	1	2	15	—	—	—	—	—
WHA totals			68	5	29	34	15	—	—	—	—	—
NHL totals			726	43	218	261	1456	74	2	10	12	195

Preceded by Clark Gillies	New York Islanders first-round draft pick 1975	Succeeded by Alex McKendry
Preceded by Bob Neely	WHA First Overall Draft Pick; 1974	Succeeded by Claude Larose
Preceded by Colin Campbell	Vancouver Blazers first round draft pick 1974	Succeeded by Denny McLean
