= Jeffrey Hymanson =

American ice hockey player

- Born: March 11, 1954 (age 72) Anoka, Minnesota, United States
- Height: 6 ft 2 in (188 cm)
- Weight: 195 lb (88 kg; 13 st 13 lb)
- Position: Defense
- Played for: IFK Luleå
- National team: United States
- NHL draft: 222nd overall, 1974; Minnesota North Stars
- Playing career: 1976–1977

Jeffrey Hymanson (born March 11, 1954) is an American ice hockey player. He competed in the men's tournament at the 1976 Winter Olympics.
