= Dave Syvret =

Canadian ice hockey player

- Born: October 28, 1954 (age 70); Hamilton, Ontario, Canada
- Height: 6 ft 0 in (183 cm)
- Weight: 185 lb (84 kg; 13 st 3 lb)
- Position: Defence
- Shot: Left
- Played for: Toronto Toros; Birmingham Bulls
- NHL draft: 155th overall, 1974; Toronto Maple Leafs
- Playing career: 1975–1978

David James Syvret (born October 28, 1954) is a former Canadian professional ice hockey player who played in the World Hockey Association (WHA). Syvret played parts of two WHA seasons with the Toronto Toros and Birmingham Bulls. He was drafted in the ninth round of the 1974 NHL amateur draft by the Toronto Maple Leafs. He is the father of Danny Syvret, who played in the National Hockey League, and Corey Syvret, who was a 2007 sixth-round draft pick of the Florida Panthers and played in the American Hockey League and ECHL.

== Career statistics ==
			Regular season					Playoffs
Season	Team	League	GP	G	A	Pts	PIM	GP	G	A	Pts	PIM
1971–72	Hamilton Red Wings	OHA-Jr.	59	1	12	13	64	—	—	—	—	—
1973–74	St. Catharines Black Hawks	OHA-Jr.	63	7	40	47	34	—	—	—	—	—
1975–76	Toronto Toros	WHA	50	1	11	12	14	—	—	—	—	—
1975–76	Buffalo Norsemen	NAHL-Sr.	33	3	26	29	40	—	—	—	—	—
1976–77	Birmingham Bulls	WHA	8	0	0	0	0	—	—	—	—	—
1976–77	Erie Blades	NAHL-Sr.	54	11	22	33	44	9	3	8	11	10
1977–78	Binghamton Dusters	AHL	49	2	26	28	40	—	—	—	—	—
1977–78	Phoenix Roadrunners	CHL	27	1	5	6	8	—	—	—	—	—
WHA totals			58	1	11	12	14	—	—	—	—	—
NAHL-Sr. totals			87	14	48	62	84	9	3	8	11	10
