= Bill Davis (ice hockey) =

Canadian ice hockey player (born 1954)

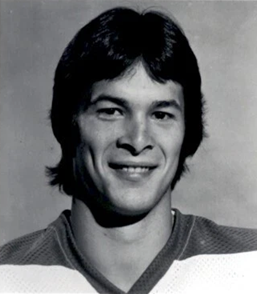
- Davis in 1978 photo
- Born: August 22, 1954 (age 71) Lindsay, Ontario, Canada
- Height: 6 ft 1 in (185 cm)
- Weight: 195 lb (88 kg; 13 st 13 lb)
- Position: Defence
- Shot: Left
- Played for: Winnipeg Jets (WHA)
- NHL draft: 216th overall, 1974; Pittsburgh Penguins
- Playing career: 1977–1981

William Lloyd Davis (born August 22, 1954) is a Canadian former professional ice hockey defenceman who played in the World Hockey Association (WHA). Davis played parts of two WHA seasons with the Winnipeg Jets. He was drafted in the fourteenth round of the 1974 NHL amateur draft by the Pittsburgh Penguins.

== Career statistics ==
			Regular season					Playoffs
Season	Team	League	GP	G	A	Pts	PIM	GP	G	A	Pts	PIM
1973–74	Colgate University	NCAA	28	2	6	8	26	—	—	—	—	—
1974–75	Colgate University	NCAA	26	5	29	34	54	—	—	—	—	—
1975–76	Colgate University	NCAA	25	6	15	21	38	—	—	—	—	—
1976–77	Colgate University	NCAA	28	6	20	26	62	—	—	—	—	—
1977–78	Philadelphia Firebirds	AHL	58	3	14	17	27	—	—	—	—	—
1977–78	Winnipeg Jets	WHA	12	0	0	0	2	—	—	—	—	—
1978–79	Philadelphia Firebirds	AHL	50	1	15	16	34	—	—	—	—	—
1978–79	Winnipeg Jets	WHA	5	1	2	3	0	—	—	—	—	—
1979–80	Tulsa Oilers	CHL	74	2	12	14	94	3	1	0	1	6
1980–81	Tulsa Oilers	CHL	71	4	13	17	93	8	0	1	1	6
WHA totals			17	1	2	3	2	—	—	—	—	—
AHL totals			108	4	29	33	61	—	—	—	—	—
