= Tucson Mavericks =

Minor league ice hockey team (1975 to 1976)

- City: Tucson, Arizona
- League: Central Hockey League
- Operated: 1975–1976
- Home arena: Tucson Community Center
- Affiliates: Denver Spurs; Houston Aeros; Phoenix Roadrunners

The Tucson Mavericks were a minor league professional ice hockey team in the Central Hockey League from 1975 to 1976.

The team was run by Head coach Adam Keller and General Manager Merle Miller.

== Season results ==
Season	Games	Won	Lost	Tied	Points	Goals for	Goals against
1975–76	76	14	53	9	37	242	396
