= WHA amateur draft =

Hockey league draft

The WHA amateur draft was the entry draft for the World Hockey Association. The professional league operated from 1972 to 1979, but only held its annual draft from 1973 through 1978.

The fledgling WHA had some trouble stocking their teams, with many of the players drafted by WHA teams never reporting, preferring instead to play in the long-established National Hockey League. In 1975, only three of the fifteen first-round picks played a game in the new league. Other players would only be lured with extravagant salaries, such as the $1.3 million ($7.8 million today) contract Pat Price signed with the Vancouver Blazers in 1974.

The WHA held a secretive, short draft in February 1978 without releasing the names of the drafted players with the expectation of having their regular amateur draft in June of that year. The June draft was never held.

== First overall picks ==
List of first overall picks:

Year	Player	Position	Amateur club	Drafted by
1973	Bob Neely	Defenceman	Peterborough (OHA)	Chicago Cougars
1974	Pat Price (Note: This pick was considered the official #1 pick for what was considered the official 1974 WHA Amateur Draft done in May. However, there was also a secret 1974 WHA Amateur Draft done in February first. For that draft, the first pick there was defenceman Greg Joly from Regina (WCHL) by the Phoenix Roadrunners.)	Defenceman	Saskatoon (WCHL)	Vancouver Blazers
1975	Claude Larose	Forward	Sherbrooke (QMJHL)	Cincinnati Stingers
1976	Blair Chapman	Forward	Saskatoon (WCHL)	Edmonton Oilers
1977	Scott Campbell	Defenceman	London (OMJHL)	Houston Aeros

Notes

Of the five first-overall draft picks selected in the WHA amateur draft, Bob Neely and Blair Chapman never reported to the league. Pat Price, drafted after a 95-point season as a defenceman in junior hockey, was considered an expensive flop, though he was drafted by the New York Islanders after only one year in Vancouver and went on to a 13-year career in the NHL. Only Scott Campbell and Claude Larose had reasonably active and prosperous WHA careers.

The WHA draft was abandoned in 1978 when merger talks with the NHL broke down. The league instead encouraged teams to negotiate with junior players as free agents, including underage players.

== See also ==
- WHA general player draft
- NHL entry draft
