= 1974–75 Pittsburgh Penguins season =

NHL team season

1974–75 Pittsburgh Penguins
- Division: 3rd Norris
- Conference: 5th Wales
- 1974–75 record: 37–28–15
- Home record: 25–5–10
- Road record: 12–23–5
- Goals for: 326
- Goals against: 289

Team information
- General manager: Jack Button
- Coach: Marc Boileau
- Captain: Ron Schock
- Alternate captains: Syl Apps; Dave Burrows; Bob Paradise
- Arena: Pittsburgh Civic Arena

Team leaders
- Goals: Jean Pronovost (43)
- Assists: Ron Schock (63)
- Points: Ron Schock (86)
- Penalty minutes: Colin Campbell (172)
- Wins: Gary Inness (24)
- Goals against average: Gary Inness (3.09)

The 1974–75 Pittsburgh Penguins season was the franchise's eighth season in the National Hockey League (NHL). It was also the Penguins first season in the Norris division of the Prince of Wales Conference. The team qualified for the playoffs for the third time in franchise history, losing to the New York Islanders after gaining a 3–0 lead (in a best-of-seven series) in the quarter-final round.

== Offseason ==
In early 1975, newspapers reported that the California Golden Seals and Penguins were to be relocated to Denver and Seattle respectively, in an arrangement that would have seen the two teams sold to groups in those cities that had already been awarded "conditional" franchises for the 1976–77 season. After staunchly rejecting previous franchise relocation attempts, league president Clarence Campbell saw this as a method by which the NHL might extricate itself from two problem markets, while honoring the expansion commitments it had made. However Seattle Totems owner Vince Abbey missed an opportunity to acquire the Penguins when they were sold in a bankruptcy auction for $4.4 million in June 1975. The Penguins ended up staying in Pittsburgh and ultimately, over time, made Pittsburgh one of the NHL's stronger markets.

== Regular season ==
=== Final standings ===
Norris Division
		GP	W	L	T	GF	GA	DIFF	Pts
1	Montreal Canadiens	80	47	14	19	374	225	+149	113
2	Los Angeles Kings	80	42	17	21	269	185	+84	105
3	Pittsburgh Penguins	80	37	28	15	326	289	+37	89
4	Detroit Red Wings	80	23	45	12	259	335	−76	58
5	Washington Capitals	80	8	67	5	181	446	−265	21

=== Record vs. opponents ===
Norris Division record vs. opponents

Vs. Wales Conference

Vs. Campbell Conference

Vs. Norris Division

1974–75 NHL records
Team	DET	LAK	MTL	PIT	WSH	Total
Detroit	—	0–5–1	0–4–2	2–4	5–1	7–14–3
Los Angeles	5–0–1	—	1–2–3	3–1–2	5–0–1	14–3–7
Montreal	4–0–2	2–1–3	—	4–1–1	6–0	16–2–6
Pittsburgh	4–2	1–3–2	1–4–1	—	5–1	11–10–3
Washington	1–5	0–5–1	0–6	1–5	—	2–21–1

Vs. Adams Division

1974–75 NHL records
Team	BOS	BUF	CAL	TOR	Total
Detroit	1–4	1–3–1	2–2–1	1–3–1	5–12–3
Los Angeles	3–2	3–1–1	2–1–2	4–0–1	12–4–4
Montreal	3–0–2	0–4–1	5–0	1–2–2	9–6–5
Pittsburgh	1–2–2	0–3–2	4–0–1	4–1	9–6–5
Washington	0–4–1	0–5	2–3	1–4	3–16–1

Vs. Patrick Division

1974–75 NHL records
Team	ATL	NYI	NYR	PHI	Total
Detroit	2–2	2–2	1–2–1	1–2–1	6–8–2
Los Angeles	1–2–1	0–1–3	1–1–2	1–2–1	3–6–7
Montreal	3–0–1	0–2–2	2–0–2	1–2–1	6–4–6
Pittsburgh	1–1–2	2–2	2–2	1–3	6–8–2
Washington	0–3–1	0–4	1–2–1	0–4	1–13–2

Vs. Smythe Division

1974–75 NHL records
Team	CHI	KCS	MIN	STL	VAN	Total
Detroit	1–2–1	3–1	0–2–2	0–3–1	1–3	5–11–4
Los Angeles	2–2	3–1	4–0	3–0–1	1–1–2	13–4–3
Montreal	3–0–1	4–0	4–0	1–2–1	4–0	16–2–2
Pittsburgh	2–1–1	2–0–2	3–1	1–1–2	3–1	11–4–5
Washington	1–3	1–3	0–3–1	0–4	0–4	2–17–1

== Schedule and results ==
1974–75 regular season
October: 2–4–1 (home: 1–2–1; road: 1–2–0), 5 points

#	Date	Visitor	Score	Home	Location	Record	Points
1	Oct 9	Pittsburgh Penguins	4–2	Minnesota North Stars	Met Center	1–0–0	2
2	Oct 12	Detroit Red Wings	2–7	Pittsburgh Penguins	Civic Arena	2–0–0	4
3	Oct 19	Philadelphia Flyers	6–3	Pittsburgh Penguins	Civic Arena	2–1–0	4
4	Oct 20	Pittsburgh Penguins	1–5	Atlanta Flames	Omni Coliseum	2–2–0	4
5	Oct 23	Boston Bruins	5–5	Pittsburgh Penguins	Civic Arena	2–2–1	5
6	Oct 26	New York Rangers	5–4	Pittsburgh Penguins	Civic Arena	2–3–1	5
7	Oct 28	Pittsburgh Penguins	0–2	Los Angeles Kings	The Forum	2–4–1	5

November: 6–6–3 (home: 3–2–2; road: 3–4–1), 15 points

#	Date	Visitor	Score	Home	Location	Record	Points
8	Nov 1	Pittsburgh Penguins	4–7	Vancouver Canucks	Pacific Coliseum	2–5–1	5
9	Nov 3	Pittsburgh Penguins	3–3	Chicago Black Hawks	Chicago Stadium	2–5–2	6
10	Nov 5	Pittsburgh Penguins	5–3	Kansas City Scouts	Kemper Arena	3–5–2	8
11	Nov 7	Los Angeles Kings	5–3	Pittsburgh Penguins	Civic Arena	3–6–2	8
12	Nov 9	California Golden Seals	2–5	Pittsburgh Penguins	Civic Arena	4–6–2	10
13	Nov 10	Pittsburgh Penguins	3–8	Buffalo Sabres	Buffalo Memorial Auditorium	4–7–2	10
14	Nov 13	New York Islanders	2–8	Pittsburgh Penguins	Civic Arena	5–7–2	12
15	Nov 16	Washington Capitals	1–8	Pittsburgh Penguins	Civic Arena	6–7–2	14
16	Nov 17	Pittsburgh Penguins	6–0	Washington Capitals	Capital Centre	7–7–2	16
17	Nov 19	Pittsburgh Penguins	3–4	New York Islanders	Nassau Veterans Memorial Coliseum	7–8–2	16
18	Nov 20	Pittsburgh Penguins	8–5	Toronto Maple Leafs	Maple Leaf Gardens	8–8–2	18
19	Nov 23	Los Angeles Kings	0–0	Pittsburgh Penguins	Civic Arena	8–8–3	19
20	Nov 24	Pittsburgh Penguins	5–7	New York Rangers	Madison Square Garden (IV)	8–9–3	19
21	Nov 27	Montreal Canadiens	3–2	Pittsburgh Penguins	Civic Arena	8–10–3	19
22	Nov 30	Buffalo Sabres	5–5	Pittsburgh Penguins	Civic Arena	8–10–4	20

December: 4–6–4 (home: 3–0–4; road: 1–6–0), 12 points

#	Date	Visitor	Score	Home	Location	Record	Points
23	Dec 1	Pittsburgh Penguins	3–6	Buffalo Sabres	Buffalo Memorial Auditorium	8–11–4	20
24	Dec 4	Toronto Maple Leafs	2–4	Pittsburgh Penguins	Civic Arena	9–11–4	22
25	Dec 7	Pittsburgh Penguins	2–5	Montreal Canadiens	Montreal Forum	9–12–4	22
26	Dec 8	Pittsburgh Penguins	2–3	Boston Bruins	Boston Garden	9–13–4	22
27	Dec 12	Montreal Canadiens	3–3	Pittsburgh Penguins	Civic Arena	9–13–5	23
28	Dec 14	Chicago Black Hawks	3–6	Pittsburgh Penguins	Civic Arena	10–13–5	25
29	Dec 15	Pittsburgh Penguins	3–2	Detroit Red Wings	Olympia Stadium	11–13–5	27
30	Dec 18	Pittsburgh Penguins	4–6	Toronto Maple Leafs	Maple Leaf Gardens	11–14–5	27
31	Dec 19	Kansas City Scouts	4–4	Pittsburgh Penguins	Civic Arena	11–14–6	28
32	Dec 21	Pittsburgh Penguins	7–8	Minnesota North Stars	Met Center	11–15–6	28
33	Dec 22	Pittsburgh Penguins	0–4	Philadelphia Flyers	The Spectrum	11–16–6	28
34	Dec 26	St. Louis Blues	2–2	Pittsburgh Penguins	Civic Arena	11–16–7	29
35	Dec 28	Atlanta Flames	3–3	Pittsburgh Penguins	Civic Arena	11–16–8	30
36	Dec 30	Toronto Maple Leafs	5–7	Pittsburgh Penguins	Civic Arena	12–16–8	32

January: 8–3–2 (home: 7–0–1; road: 1–3–1), 18 points

#	Date	Visitor	Score	Home	Location	Record	Points
37	Jan 2	Minnesota North Stars	3–6	Pittsburgh Penguins	Civic Arena	13–16–8	34
38	Jan 4	Vancouver Canucks	3–4	Pittsburgh Penguins	Civic Arena	14–16–8	36
39	Jan 8	Pittsburgh Penguins	5–7	Chicago Black Hawks	Chicago Stadium	14–17–8	36
40	Jan 10	Pittsburgh Penguins	3–3	Atlanta Flames	Omni Coliseum	14–17–9	37
41	Jan 11	California Golden Seals	3–6	Pittsburgh Penguins	Civic Arena	15–17–9	39
42	Jan 15	Atlanta Flames	3–5	Pittsburgh Penguins	Civic Arena	16–17–9	41
43	Jan 18	Boston Bruins	4–4	Pittsburgh Penguins	Civic Arena	16–17–10	42
44	Jan 19	Pittsburgh Penguins	3–2	Washington Capitals	Capital Centre	17–17–10	44
45	Jan 22	California Golden Seals	5–7	Pittsburgh Penguins	Civic Arena	18–17–10	46
46	Jan 25	New York Rangers	2–5	Pittsburgh Penguins	Civic Arena	19–17–10	48
47	Jan 26	Pittsburgh Penguins	2–7	Montreal Canadiens	Montreal Forum	19–18–10	48
48	Jan 29	Chicago Black Hawks	1–6	Pittsburgh Penguins	Civic Arena	20–18–10	50
49	Jan 30	Pittsburgh Penguins	2–5	Detroit Red Wings	Olympia Stadium	20–19–10	50

February: 7–3–3 (home: 3–1–2; road: 4–2–1), 17 points

#	Date	Visitor	Score	Home	Location	Record	Points
50	Feb 1	Pittsburgh Penguins	4–4	St. Louis Blues	St. Louis Arena	20–19–11	51
51	Feb 4	Pittsburgh Penguins	3–2	Vancouver Canucks	Pacific Coliseum	21–19–11	53
52	Feb 5	Pittsburgh Penguins	3–2	Los Angeles Kings	The Forum	22–19–11	55
53	Feb 7	Pittsburgh Penguins	4–1	California Golden Seals	Oakland Coliseum Arena	23–19–11	57
54	Feb 11	Pittsburgh Penguins	1–2	New York Islanders	Nassau Veterans Memorial Coliseum	23–20–11	57
55	Feb 12	Buffalo Sabres	3–3	Pittsburgh Penguins	Civic Arena	23–20–12	58
56	Feb 15	Pittsburgh Penguins	8–3	Toronto Maple Leafs	Maple Leaf Gardens	24–20–12	60
57	Feb 16	New York Islanders	2–3	Pittsburgh Penguins	Civic Arena	25–20–12	62
58	Feb 19	Los Angeles Kings	2–2	Pittsburgh Penguins	Civic Arena	25–20–13	63
59	Feb 22	St. Louis Blues	2–3	Pittsburgh Penguins	Civic Arena	26–20–13	65
60	Feb 23	Detroit Red Wings	3–1	Pittsburgh Penguins	Civic Arena	26–21–13	65
61	Feb 25	Pittsburgh Penguins	4–6	Boston Bruins	Boston Garden	26–22–13	65
62	Feb 26	Washington Capitals	1–3	Pittsburgh Penguins	Civic Arena	27–22–13	67

March: 9–4–2 (home: 7–0–0; road: 2–4–2), 20 points

#	Date	Visitor	Score	Home	Location	Record	Points
63	Mar 1	Vancouver Canucks	3–7	Pittsburgh Penguins	Civic Arena	28–22–13	69
64	Mar 2	Pittsburgh Penguins	8–6	New York Rangers	Madison Square Garden (IV)	29–22–13	71
65	Mar 5	Pittsburgh Penguins	4–4	Kansas City Scouts	Kemper Arena	29–22–14	72
66	Mar 8	Philadelphia Flyers	2–8	Pittsburgh Penguins	Civic Arena	30–22–14	74
67	Mar 9	Pittsburgh Penguins	4–8	Buffalo Sabres	Buffalo Memorial Auditorium	30–23–14	74
68	Mar 12	Boston Bruins	3–5	Pittsburgh Penguins	Civic Arena	31–23–14	76
69	Mar 13	Pittsburgh Penguins	0–6	Philadelphia Flyers	The Spectrum	31–24–14	76
70	Mar 15	Washington Capitals	1–12	Pittsburgh Penguins	Civic Arena	32–24–14	78
71	Mar 16	Kansas City Scouts	3–6	Pittsburgh Penguins	Civic Arena	33–24–14	80
72	Mar 18	Pittsburgh Penguins	2–5	St. Louis Blues	St. Louis Arena	33–25–14	80
73	Mar 19	Pittsburgh Penguins	3–3	California Golden Seals	Oakland Coliseum Arena	33–25–15	81
74	Mar 22	Pittsburgh Penguins	0–4	Los Angeles Kings	The Forum	33–26–15	81
75	Mar 26	Montreal Canadiens	4–6	Pittsburgh Penguins	Civic Arena	34–26–15	83
76	Mar 29	Pittsburgh Penguins	4–2	Detroit Red Wings	Olympia Stadium	35–26–15	85
77	Mar 30	Minnesota North Stars	1–4	Pittsburgh Penguins	Civic Arena	36–26–15	87

April: 1–2–0 (home: 1–0–0; road: 0–2–0), 2 points

#	Date	Visitor	Score	Home	Location	Record	Points
78	Apr 2	Pittsburgh Penguins	0–6	Montreal Canadiens	Montreal Forum	36–27–15	87
79	Apr 5	Detroit Red Wings	1–7	Pittsburgh Penguins	Civic Arena	37–27–15	89
80	Apr 6	Pittsburgh Penguins	4–8	Washington Capitals	Capital Centre	37–28–15	89

Legend: Win (2 points) Loss (0 points) Tie (1 point)

== Playoffs ==
=== Preliminary round vs. St. Louis Blues ===
April 8	St. Louis Blues	3–4	Pittsburgh Penguins	Civic Arena

April 10	Pittsburgh Penguins	5–3	St. Louis Blues	St. Louis Arena

Pittsburgh won series 2–0

=== Quarterfinals vs. New York Islanders ===
April 13	New York Islanders	4–5	Pittsburgh Penguins	Civic Arena

April 15	New York Islanders	1–3	Pittsburgh Penguins	Civic Arena

April 17	Pittsburgh Penguins	6–4	New York Islanders	Nassau Coliseum

April 20	Pittsburgh Penguins	1–3	New York Islanders	Nassau Coliseum

April 22	New York Islanders	4–2	Pittsburgh Penguins	Civic Arena

April 24	Pittsburgh Penguins	1–4	New York Islanders	Nassau Coliseum

April 26	New York Islanders	1–0	Pittsburgh Penguins	Civic Arena

New York won series 4–3

== Player statistics ==
Skaters

Regular season
Player	GP	G	A	Pts	+/−	PIM
Ron Schock	80	23	63	86	22	36
Syl Apps Jr.	79	24	55	79	8	43
Jean Pronovost	78	43	32	75	13	37
Vic Hadfield	78	31	42	73	5	72
Pierre Larouche	79	31	37	68	2	52
Rick Kehoe	76	32	31	63	18	22
Lowell MacDonald	71	27	33	60	16	24
Ron Stackhouse	72	15	45	60	13	52
Chuck Arnason	78	26	32	58	0	32
J. Bob Kelly	69	27	24	51	6	120
Barry Wilkins^{†}	59	5	29	34	29	97
Colin Campbell	59	4	15	19	28	172
Bob Paradise	78	3	15	18	–2	109
Pete Laframboise^{†}	35	5	13	18	3	8
Dave Burrows	78	2	15	17	3	49
Dennis Owchar	46	6	11	17	12	67
Bob McManama	40	5	9	14	6	6
Lew Morrison^{†}	52	7	5	12	–5	4
Jean-Guy Lagace^{‡}	27	1	8	9	5	39
Nelson Debenedet	31	6	3	9	–3	11
Kelly Pratt	22	0	6	6	1	15
Ron Lalonde^{‡}	24	0	3	3	1	0
Ab Demarco Jr.^{‡}	8	2	1	3	–4	4
Mario Faubert	10	1	0	1	–2	6
Steve Durbano	1	0	1	1	0	10
Yves Bergeron	2	0	0	0	–3	0
Harvey Bennett Jr.	7	0	0	0	–2	0
Bob Stumpf^{†}	3	0	0	0	–4	4
Wayne Bianchin	2	0	0	0	–1	0
Total		326	528	854	—	1,091

Playoffs
Player	GP	G	A	Pts	+/−	PIM
Ron Stackhouse	9	2	6	8	0	10
J. Bob Kelly	9	5	3	8	0	17
Pierre Larouche	9	2	5	7	0	2
Chuck Arnason	9	2	4	6	0	4
Vic Hadfield	9	4	2	6	0	0
Lowell MacDonald	9	4	2	6	0	4
Jean Pronovost	9	3	3	6	0	6
Syl Apps Jr.	9	2	3	5	0	9
Ron Schock	9	0	4	4	0	10
Colin Campbell	9	1	3	4	0	21
Dave Burrows	9	1	1	2	0	12
Rick Kehoe	9	0	2	2	0	0
Dennis Owchar	6	0	1	1	0	4
Bob McManama	8	0	1	1	0	6
Pete Laframboise	9	1	0	1	0	0
Bob Paradise	6	0	1	1	0	17
Barry Wilkins	3	0	0	0	0	0
Larry Bignell	3	0	0	0	0	2
Lew Morrison	9	0	0	0	0	0
Total		27	41	68	—	124

Goaltenders

Regular season
Player	GP	W	L	T	GA	SO
Gary Inness	57	24	18	10	161	2
Michel Plasse^{†}	20	9	5	4	73	0
Bob Johnson	12	3	4	1	40	0
Denis Herron^{‡}	3	1	1	0	11	0
Total		37	28	15	285	2

Playoffs
Player	GP	W	L	T	GA	SO
Gary Inness	9	5	4	0	24	0
Total		5	4	0	24	0

^{†}Denotes player spent time with another team before joining the Penguins. Stats reflect time with the Penguins only.
^{‡}Denotes player was traded mid-season. Stats reflect time with the Penguins only.

== Awards and records ==
- Jean Pronovost became the first player to score 300 points for the Penguins. He did so in a 5–5 tie with Boston on October 23.
- Syl Apps Jr. became the first player to record 200 assists for the Penguins. He did so in a 7–5 win over Toronto on December 30.
- Jean Pronovost became the first person to play 500 games for the Penguins. He did so in an 8–6 win over New York on March 2.
- Pierre Larouche established a rookie record for the Penguins in terms of goals (31) assists (37) and points (68).
- Ron Schock established a new franchise record for assists in a season with 63, besting the previous high of 61 held by Syl Apps Jr.
- Ron Schock established a new franchise record for points in a season with 86, besting the previous high of 85 held by Syl Apps Jr.
- Ron Stackhouse established a new franchise defenseman record for assists (45) and points (60) in a season. He topped the previous highs held by Duane Rupp (28 assists) and Darryl Edestrand (39 points). He also tied Edstrand for the team record with 15 goals.

== Transactions ==
The Penguins were involved in the following transactions during the 1974–75 season:

=== Trades ===
September 13, 1974	To Toronto Maple Leafs Blaine Stoughton; 1977 1st round pick (Trevor Johansen)	To Pittsburgh Penguins Rick Kehoe
November 2, 1974	To Vancouver Canucks Ab DeMarco Jr.	To Pittsburgh Penguins Barry Wilkins
December 14, 1974	To Washington Capitals Ron Lalonde	To Pittsburgh Penguins Lew Morrison
January 10, 1975	To Kansas City Scouts Denis Herron; Jean-Guy Lagace	To Pittsburgh Penguins Michel Plasse
January 20, 1975	To St. Louis Blues Bernie Lukowich	To Pittsburgh Penguins Bob Stumpf
January 21, 1975	To Washington Capitals Ron Jones	To Pittsburgh Penguins Pete Laframboise

=== Additions and subtractions ===
Additions
Player	Former team	Via
Harvey Bennett	Des Moines Capitols (IHL)	free agency (1974–06–25)
Kelly Pratt	Jacksonville Barons (AHL)	free agency (1974–07–15)

Subtractions
Player	New team	Via
Andy Brown	Indianapolis Racers (WHA)	free agency (1974)
Duane Rupp	Vancouver Blazers (WHA)	free agency (1974–06)
Jim Wiley	Vancouver Canucks	Intra-league draft (1974–06–10)
Robin Burns	Kansas City Scouts	Expansion draft (1974–06–12)
Yvon Labre	Washington Capitals	Expansion draft (1974–06–12)
Ted Snell	Kansas City Scouts	Expansion draft (1974–06–12)

== Draft picks ==
Pittsburgh Penguins' picks at the 1974 NHL amateur draft.

Round	#	Player	Pos	Nationality	College/Junior/Club team (League)
1	8	Pierre Larouche	C	Canada	Sorel Black Hawks (QMJHL)
2	27^{[a]}	Jacques Cossette	RW	Canada	Sorel Black Hawks (QMJHL)
4	62	Mario Faubert	D	Canada	St. Louis University (NCAA)
5	80	Bruce Aberhart	G	Canada	London Knights (OHA)
6	98	William Schneider	LW	United States	University of Minnesota (NCAA)
7	116	Rob Laird	LW	Canada	Regina Pats (WCHL)
8	133	Larry Finck	D	Canada	St. Catharines Black Hawks (OHA)
9	150	Jim Chicoyne	D	Canada	Brandon Wheat Kings (WCHL)
10	166	Rick Uhrich	RW	Canada	Regina Pats (WCHL)
11	181	Serge Gamelin	RW	Canada	Sorel Black Hawks (QMJHL)
12	195	Rich Perron	D	Canada	Quebec Ramparts (QMJHL)
13	206	Rick Hindmarch	RW	Canada	University of Calgary (CIAU)
14	216	Bill Davis	D	Canada	Colgate University (NCAA)
15	223	James Mathers	D	United States	Northeastern University (NCAA)

Draft notes

- The Pittsburgh Penguins' second-round pick went to the St. Louis Blues as the result of a January 17, 1974, trade that sent Steve Durbano, Ab DeMarco, and Bob Kelly to the Penguins in exchange for Bryan Watson, Greg Polis and this pick.
- ^{a} The Detroit Red Wings' second-round pick went to the Pittsburgh Penguins as a result of an October 6, 1972, trade that sent Roy Edwards to the Red Wings in exchange for a 1973 second-round pick and this pick.
- The Pittsburgh Penguins' third-round pick went to the Detroit Red Wings as the result of a June 27, 1974, trade that sent Nelson Debenedet to the Penguins in exchange for Hank Nowak and this pick.
