= 1974–75 Philadelphia Flyers season =

NHL hockey team season (won Stanley Cup)

1974–75 Philadelphia Flyers
- Stanley Cup champions
- Campbell Conference champions
- Patrick Division champions
- Division: 1st Patrick
- Conference: 1st Campbell
- 1974–75 record: 51–18–11
- Home record: 32–6–2
- Road record: 19–12–9
- Goals for: 293 (6th)
- Goals against: 181 (1st)

Team information
- General manager: Keith Allen
- Coach: Fred Shero
- Captain: Bobby Clarke
- Alternate captains: Terry Crisp; Gary Dornhoefer
- Arena: Spectrum
- Average attendance: 17,077
- Minor league affiliates: Richmond Robins; Philadelphia Firebirds

Team leaders
- Goals: Reggie Leach (45)
- Assists: Bobby Clarke (89)
- Points: Bobby Clarke (116)
- Penalty minutes: Dave Schultz (472)
- Plus/minus: Bobby Clarke (+79)
- Wins: Bernie Parent (44)
- Goals against average: Bernie Parent (2.04)

The 1974–75 Philadelphia Flyers season was the franchise's eighth season in the National Hockey League (NHL). The Flyers repeated as Stanley Cup champions. The 1974–75 Flyers were the last Stanley Cup champion to be composed entirely of Canadian players.

As of 2025, this remains the most recent season where the Flyers won the Stanley Cup as the Flyers have lost six Stanley Cup Final series in 1976, 1980, 1985, 1987, 1997 and 2010.

== Regular season ==
In 1974–75, Dave Schultz topped his mark from the previous season by setting an NHL record for penalty minutes (472 in all). Bobby Clarke's efforts earned him his second Hart Trophy and Bernie Parent was the lone recipient of the Vezina Trophy. The Flyers as a team improved their record slightly with a mark of 51–18–11, the best record in the league.

=== Season standings ===
Patrick Division
		GP	W	L	T	GF	GA	DIFF	Pts
1	Philadelphia Flyers	80	51	18	11	293	181	+112	113
2	New York Rangers	80	37	29	14	319	276	+43	88
3	New York Islanders	80	33	25	22	264	221	+43	88
4	Atlanta Flames	80	34	31	15	243	233	+10	83

=== Record vs. opponents ===
Patrick Division record vs. opponents

Vs. Campbell Conference

Vs. Wales Conference

Vs. Patrick Division

1974–75 NHL records
Team	ATL	NYI	NYR	PHI	Total
Atlanta	—	2–1–3	3–3	2–3–1	7–7–4
N.Y. Islanders	1–2–3	—	2–3–1	1–3–2	4–8–6
N.Y. Rangers	3–3	3–2–1	—	2–3–1	8–8–2
Philadelphia	3–2–1	3–1–2	3–2–1	—	9–5–4

Vs. Smythe Division

1974–75 NHL records
Team	CHI	KCS	MIN	STL	VAN	Total
Atlanta	2–3	4–0–1	3–1–1	2–3	1–2–2	12–9–4
N.Y. Islanders	1–1–3	4–1	4–0–1	2–2–1	1–2–2	12–6–7
N.Y. Rangers	3–1–1	4–0–1	4–1	3–1–1	3–2	17–5–3
Philadelphia	4–1	4–0–1	4–1	3–2	4–1	19–5–1

Vs. Adams Division

1974–75 NHL records
Team	BOS	BUF	CAL	TOR	Total
Atlanta	0–4–1	2–1–1	2–2	3–1	7–8–2
N.Y. Islanders	2–2	0–2–2	2–1–1	2–2–1	6–7–4
N.Y. Rangers	1–3	1–4	2–0–2	1–2–1	5–9–3
Philadelphia	1–2–1	3–0–1	3–2	3–0–1	10–4–3

Vs. Norris Division

1974–75 NHL records
Team	DET	LAK	MTL	PIT	WSH	Total
Atlanta	2–2	2–1–1	0–3–1	1–1–2	3–0–1	8–7–5
N.Y. Islanders	2–2	1–0–3	2–0–2	2–2	4–0	11–4–5
N.Y. Rangers	2–1–1	1–1–2	0–2–2	2–2	2–1–1	7–7–6
Philadelphia	2–1–1	2–1–1	2–1–1	3–1	4–0	13–4–3

== Playoffs ==
After a first-round bye, the Flyers easily swept the Toronto Maple Leafs and were presented with another New York-area team in the semifinals. The Flyers looked to be headed toward another sweep against the New York Islanders after winning the first three games. The Islanders, however, fought back by winning the next three games, setting up a deciding seventh game. The Flyers were finally able to shut the door on the Islanders, winning game seven, 4–1.

Facing the Buffalo Sabres in the Stanley Cup Final, the Flyers won the first two games at home. Game three, played in Buffalo, would go down in hockey lore as "The Fog Game" due to an unusual May heat wave in Buffalo which forced parts of the game to be played in heavy fog, as Buffalo's arena lacked air conditioning. The Flyers lost games three and four, but won game five at home in dominating fashion, 5–1. On the road for game six, Bob Kelly scored the decisive goal and Parent posted another shutout (his fourth of the playoffs) as the Flyers repeated as Stanley Cup champions. Parent also repeated as the playoff MVP, winning his second consecutive Conn Smythe Trophy.

== Schedule and results ==
=== Regular season ===
1974–75 regular season
October: 6–3–1 (home: 3–2–1; road: 3–1–0)

Game	Date	Score	Opponent	Decision	Attendance	Record	Points	Recap
1	October 10	3–5	Los Angeles Kings	Parent	17,007	0–1–0	0	L
2	October 12	6–1	Buffalo Sabres	Parent	17,007	1–1–0	2	W
3	October 13	3–2	Kansas City Scouts	Stephenson	17,007	2–1–0	4	W
4	October 17	1–4	Boston Bruins	Parent	17,007	2–2–0	4	L
5	October 19	6–3	@ Pittsburgh Penguins	Stephenson	13,404	3–2–0	6	W
6	October 20	2–2	Montreal Canadiens	Parent	17,007	3–2–1	7	T
7	October 22	4–2	@ Los Angeles Kings	Parent	13,558	4–2–1	9	W
8	October 25	1–4	@ California Golden Seals	Taylor	12,398	4–3–1	9	L
9	October 26	3–2	@ Vancouver Canucks	Parent	15,570	5–3–1	11	W
10	October 31	5–1	New York Rangers	Parent	17,007	6–3–1	13	W

November: 8–3–2 (home: 5–2–0; road: 3–1–2)

Game	Date	Score	Opponent	Decision	Attendance	Record	Points	Recap
11	November 2	3–0	@ Montreal Canadiens	Parent	18,005	7–3–1	15	W
12	November 3	3–1	New York Islanders	Parent	17,007	8–3–1	17	W
13	November 5	4–4	@ New York Islanders	Parent	14,865	8–3–2	18	T
14	November 7	2–0	Minnesota North Stars	Parent	17,007	9–3–2	20	W
15	November 9	6–2	Washington Capitals	Stephenson	17,007	10–3–2	22	W
16	November 10	3–0	California Golden Seals	Parent	17,007	11–3–2	24	W
17	November 13	3–2	@ New York Rangers	Parent	17,500	12–3–2	26	W
18	November 15	2–2	@ Atlanta Flames	Parent	15,141	12–3–3	27	T
19	November 16	3–5	@ St. Louis Blues	Stephenson	18,607	12–4–3	27	L
20	November 21	3–4	Vancouver Canucks	Parent	17,007	12–5–3	27	L
21	November 23	6–3	@ Toronto Maple Leafs	Parent	16,485	13–5–3	29	W
22	November 24	3–4	Atlanta Flames	Parent	17,007	13–6–3	29	L
23	November 27	6–2	Detroit Red Wings	Parent	17,007	14–6–3	31	W

December: 10–1–2 (home: 7–0–0; road: 3–1–2)

Game	Date	Score	Opponent	Decision	Attendance	Record	Points	Recap
24	December 1	10–0	Kansas City Scouts	Parent	17,007	15–6–3	33	W
25	December 5	3–2	Chicago Black Hawks	Parent	17,007	16–6–3	35	W
26	December 6	3–3	@ Kansas City Scouts	Parent	8,971	16–6–4	36	T
27	December 8	3–2	New York Islanders	Parent	17,007	17–6–4	38	W
28	December 12	6–0	Minnesota North Stars	Parent	17,007	18–6–4	40	W
29	December 13	3–2	@ Atlanta Flames	Parent	15,141	19–6–4	42	W
30	December 15	7–2	St. Louis Blues	Parent	17,007	20–6–4	44	W
31	December 19	5–1	Toronto Maple Leafs	Parent	17,007	21–6–4	46	W
32	December 21	2–2	@ Detroit Red Wings	Stephenson	14,393	21–6–5	47	T
33	December 22	4–0	Pittsburgh Penguins	Parent	17,007	22–6–5	49	W
34	December 26	4–1	@ Washington Capitals	Parent	18,130	23–6–5	51	W
35	December 28	1–2	@ Chicago Black Hawks	Parent	19,000	23–7–5	51	L
36	December 29	5–2	@ Buffalo Sabres	Parent	15,863	24–7–5	53	W

January: 7–3–2 (home: 4–1–0; road: 3–2–2)

Game	Date	Score	Opponent	Decision	Attendance	Record	Points	Recap
37	January 1	2–0	@ Vancouver Canucks	Parent	15,578	25–7–5	55	W
38	January 4	2–2	@ Los Angeles Kings	Parent	16,005	25–7–6	56	T
39	January 5	1–5	@ California Golden Seals	Parent	11,153	25–8–6	56	L
40	January 9	1–3	New York Islanders	Parent	17,007	25–9–6	56	L
41	January 11	0–6	@ Montreal Canadiens	Parent	18,721	25–10–6	56	L
42	January 12	2–1	California Golden Seals	Parent	17,007	26–10–6	58	W
43	January 14	6–4	@ Kansas City Scouts	Parent	8,057	27–10–6	60	W
44	January 16	4–0	Washington Capitals	Parent	17,007	28–10–6	62	W
45	January 18	4–1	Atlanta Flames	Parent	17,007	29–10–6	64	W
46	January 23	7–2	@ St. Louis Blues	Parent	18,022	30–10–6	66	W
47	January 26	2–2	@ Boston Bruins	Parent	15,003	30–10–7	67	T
48	January 30	3–1	Toronto Maple Leafs	Parent	17,007	31–10–7	69	W

February: 5–7–2 (home: 4–1–0; road: 1–6–2)

Game	Date	Score	Opponent	Decision	Attendance	Record	Points	Recap
49	February 1	6–0	Buffalo Sabres	Parent	17,007	32–10–7	71	W
50	February 2	1–5	@ Boston Bruins	Parent	15,003	32–11–7	71	L
51	February 5	4–3	@ New York Rangers	Parent	17,500	33–11–7	73	W
52	February 6	1–3	New York Rangers	Parent	17,007	33–12–7	73	L
53	February 8	0–5	@ Minnesota North Stars	Stephenson	15,230	33–13–7	73	L
54	February 11	1–3	@ St. Louis Blues	Parent	17,924	33–14–7	73	L
55	February 13	4–1	Chicago Black Hawks	Parent	17,007	34–14–7	75	W
56	February 15	1–1	@ New York Islanders	Parent	14,865	34–14–8	76	T
57	February 16	4–3	Boston Bruins	Parent	17,007	35–14–8	78	W
58	February 19	3–4	@ Detroit Red Wings	Parent	14,150	35–15–8	78	L
59	February 20	6–6	@ Buffalo Sabres	Parent	15,863	35–15–9	79	T
60	February 23	1–2	@ New York Rangers	Parent	17,500	35–16–9	79	L
61	February 26	4–7	@ Atlanta Flames	Parent	15,087	35–17–9	79	L
62	February 27	3–1	Vancouver Canucks	Parent	17,007	36–17–9	81	W

March: 13–1–1 (home: 8–0–0; road: 5–1–1)

Game	Date	Score	Opponent	Decision	Attendance	Record	Points	Recap
63	March 1	3–0	Kansas City Scouts	Stephenson	17,007	37–17–9	83	W
64	March 2	4–2	St. Louis Blues	Stephenson	17,007	38–17–9	85	W
65	March 5	9–2	@ Minnesota North Stars	Stephenson	14,587	39–17–9	87	W
66	March 8	2–8	@ Pittsburgh Penguins	Taylor	13,404	39–18–9	87	L
67	March 9	8–5	Detroit Red Wings	Stephenson	17,007	40–18–9	89	W
68	March 13	6–0	Pittsburgh Penguins	Parent	17,007	41–18–9	91	W
69	March 15	4–4	@ Toronto Maple Leafs	Taylor	16,485	41–18–10	92	T
70	March 16	3–0	Los Angeles Kings	Parent	17,007	42–18–10	94	W
71	March 18	7–2	@ Washington Capitals	Parent	18,130	43–18–10	96	W
72	March 22	4–0	Minnesota North Stars	Parent	17,007	44–18–10	98	W
73	March 23	2–1	Montreal Canadiens	Parent	17,007	45–18–10	100	W
74	March 25	5–3	@ Vancouver Canucks	Parent	15,570	46–18–10	102	W
75	March 26	6–2	@ California Golden Seals	Parent	11,068	47–18–10	104	W
76	March 29	5–2	@ Chicago Black Hawks	Parent	18,000	48–18–10	106	W
77	March 30	4–1	Chicago Black Hawks	Parent	17,007	49–18–10	108	W

April: 2–0–1 (home: 1–0–1; road: 1–0–0)

Game	Date	Score	Opponent	Decision	Attendance	Record	Points	Recap
78	April 3	1–1	New York Rangers	Parent	17,007	49–18–11	109	T
79	April 5	4–1	@ New York Islanders	Parent	14,865	50–18–11	111	W
80	April 6	6–2	Atlanta Flames	Parent	17,007	51–18–11	113	W

Legend: W Win (2 points) L Loss (0 points) T Tie (1 point)

=== Playoffs ===
1975 Stanley Cup playoffs
Quarterfinals vs. Toronto Maple Leafs – Flyers win 4–0

Game	Date	Score	Opponent	Decision	Attendance	Series	Recap
1	April 13	6–3	Toronto Maple Leafs	Parent	17,077	Flyers lead 1–0	W
2	April 15	3–0	Toronto Maple Leafs	Parent	17,077	Flyers lead 2–0	W
3	April 17	2–0	@ Toronto Maple Leafs	Parent	16,485	Flyers lead 3–0	W
4	April 19	4–3 OT	@ Toronto Maple Leafs	Parent	16,485	Flyers win 4–0	W

Semifinals vs. New York Islanders – Flyers win 4–3

Game	Date	Score	Opponent	Decision	Attendance	Series	Recap
1	April 29	4–0	New York Islanders	Stephenson	17,077	Flyers lead 1–0	W
2	May 1	5–4 OT	New York Islanders	Stephenson	17,077	Flyers lead 2–0	W
3	May 4	1–0	@ New York Islanders	Parent	14,865	Flyers lead 3–0	W
4	May 7	3–4	@ New York Islanders	Parent	14,865	Flyers lead 3–1	L
5	May 8	1–5	New York Islanders	Parent	17,077	Flyers lead 3–2	L
6	May 11	1–2	@ New York Islanders	Parent	14,865	Series tied 3–3	L
7	May 13	4–1	New York Islanders	Parent	17,077	Flyers win 4–3	W

Stanley Cup Final vs. Buffalo Sabres – Flyers win 4–2

Game	Date	Score	Opponent	Decision	Attendance	Series	Recap
1	May 15	4–1	Buffalo Sabres	Parent	17,077	Flyers lead 1–0	W
2	May 18	2–1	Buffalo Sabres	Parent	17,077	Flyers lead 2–0	W
3	May 20	4–5 OT	@ Buffalo Sabres	Parent	15,863	Flyers lead 2–1	L
4	May 22	2–4	@ Buffalo Sabres	Parent	15,863	Series tied 2–2	L
5	May 25	5–1	Buffalo Sabres	Parent	17,077	Flyers lead 3–2	W
6	May 27	2–0	@ Buffalo Sabres	Parent	15,863	Flyers win 4–2	W

Legend: W Win L Loss

== Player statistics ==
=== Scoring ===
- Position abbreviations: C = Center; D = Defense; G = Goaltender; LW = Left wing; RW = Right wing

No.	Player	Pos	Regular season						Playoffs					
No.	Player	Pos	GP	G	A	Pts	+/-	PIM	GP	G	A	Pts	+/-	PIM
16	Bobby Clarke	C	80	27	89	116	79	125	17	4	12	16	6	16
19	Rick MacLeish	C	80	38	41	79	29	50	17	11	9	20	17	8
27	Reggie Leach	RW	80	45	33	78	53	63	17	8	2	10	5	6
7	Bill Barber	LW	79	34	37	71	46	66	17	6	9	15	6	8
18	Ross Lonsberry	LW	80	24	25	49	28	99	17	4	3	7	2	10
12	Gary Dornhoefer	RW	69	17	27	44	23	102	17	5	5	10	11	33
10	Bill Clement	C	68	21	16	37	21	42	12	1	0	1	0	8
6	Andre Dupont	D	80	11	21	32	41	276	17	3	2	5	3	49
26	Orest Kindrachuk	C	60	10	21	31	8	72	14	0	2	2	−3	12
9	Bob Kelly	LW	67	11	18	29	21	99	16	3	3	6	8	15
3	Tom Bladon	D	76	9	20	29	42	54	13	1	3	4	4	12
11	Don Saleski	RW	63	10	18	28	7	107	17	2	3	5	3	25
15	Terry Crisp	C	71	8	19	27	11	20	9	2	4	6	3	0
8	Dave Schultz	LW	76	9	17	26	16	472	17	2	3	5	3	83
20	Jimmy Watson	D	68	7	18	25	41	72	17	1	8	9	16	10
14	Joe Watson	D	80	6	17	23	42	42	17	0	4	4	2	6
2	Ed Van Impe	D	78	1	17	18	39	109	17	0	4	4	16	28
5 (Note: Goodenough wore number 4 in his first game, number 29 in his next three games, and number 23 in the following three games.)	Larry Goodenough	D	20	3	9	12	12	0	5	0	4	4	0	2
25	Ted Harris	D	70	1	6	7	27	48	16	0	4	4	4	4
21	Bob Sirois	RW	3	1	0	1	1	4	—	—	—	—	—	—
5 (Note: Boland wore number 17 in his first game.)	Mike Boland	RW	2	0	0	0	0	0	—	—	—	—	—	—
5	Serge Lajeunesse	D	5	0	0	0	1	2	—	—	—	—	—	—
29	Jack McIlhargey	D	2	0	0	0	−1	11	—	—	—	—	—	—
17	Randy Osburn	LW	1	0	0	0	0	0	—	—	—	—	—	—
1	Bernie Parent	G	68	0	0	0		16	15	0	0	0		0
35	Wayne Stephenson	G	12	0	0	0		0	2	0	1	1		0
30	Bobby Taylor	G	3	0	0	0		2	—	—	—	—	—	—

=== Goaltending ===
= Indicates league leader

No.	Player	Regular season											Playoffs									
No.	Player	GP	GS	W	L	T	SA	GA	GAA	SV%	SO	TOI	GP	GS	W	L	SA	GA	GAA	SV%	SO	TOI
1	Bernie Parent	68	68	44	14	9	1674	137	2.04	.918	12	4,035	15	15	10	5	381	29	1.89	.924	4	920
35	Wayne Stephenson	12	10	7	2	1	274	29	2.73	.894	1	638	2	2	2	0	51	4	1.95	.922	1	123
30	Bobby Taylor	3	2	0	2	1	70	13	6.52	.814	0	120	—	—	—	—	—	—	—	—	—	—

== Awards and records ==
=== Awards ===
Type	Award/honor	Recipient	Ref
League (annual)	Conn Smythe Trophy	Bernie Parent	
League (annual)	Hart Memorial Trophy	Bobby Clarke	
League (annual)	NHL first All-Star team	Bobby Clarke (Center)	
League (annual)	NHL first All-Star team	Bernie Parent (Goaltender)	
League (annual)	Vezina Trophy	Bernie Parent	
League (in-season)	NHL All-Star Game selection	Bill Barber	
League (in-season)	NHL All-Star Game selection	Bobby Clarke	
League (in-season)	NHL All-Star Game selection	Bernie Parent	
League (in-season)	NHL All-Star Game selection	Fred Shero (Coach)	
League (in-season)	NHL All-Star Game selection	Ed Van Impe	
League (in-season)	NHL All-Star Game selection	Jim Watson	
Team	Barry Ashbee Trophy	Joe Watson	

=== Records ===
Among the team records set during the 1974–75 season was Bobby Clarke's 18-game point streak from February 26 to April 3, which was later tied by Eric Lindros during the 1998–99 season. Clarke's 89 assists on the season set a franchise high that he replicated in 1975–76. Goaltender Bernie Parent's 12 shutouts tied his mark from the previous season and enforcer Dave Schultz's 472 penalty minutes set a still-standing single season NHL record.

Two franchise winning streaks were set during the playoffs. The final win of an eight-game winning streak dating back to May 19, 1974, occurred on May 4. Likewise, the final win of an 13-game home winning streak dating back to April 9, 1974, occurred on May 1. Rick MacLeish scored a franchise record two hat tricks in the playoffs and Parent recorded four shutouts during the playoffs. The team as a whole had five shutouts during the playoffs, a mark which was later tied by the 2009–10 team.

=== Milestones ===
Milestone	Player	Date	Ref
First game	Bob Sirois	November 7, 1974	
First game	Larry Goodenough	December 26, 1974	
First game	Jack McIlhargey	February 8, 1975	
First game	Mike Boland	February 26, 1975	

=== Franchise firsts ===
Milestone	Player	Date	Ref
Penalty shot goal	Orest Kindrachuk	November 9, 1974	

== Transactions ==
The Flyers were involved in the following transactions from May 20, 1974, the day after the deciding game of the 1974 Stanley Cup Final, through May 27, 1975, the day of the deciding game of the 1975 Stanley Cup Final.

=== Trades ===
Date	Details		Ref
May 24, 1974	To Philadelphia Flyers: Reggie Leach	To California Golden Seals: Al MacAdam; Larry Wright; 1st-round pick in 1974	
May 27, 1974	To Philadelphia Flyers: Dave Fortier; Randy Osburn	To Toronto Maple Leafs: Bill Flett	
August 20, 1974	To Philadelphia Flyers: cash	To Syracuse Eagles (AHL): Larry Keenan	
September 13, 1974	To Philadelphia Flyers: Wayne Stephenson	To St. Louis Blues: Rights to Randy Andreachuk; 2nd-round pick in 1975	
September 15, 1974	To Philadelphia Flyers: Ted Harris	To St. Louis Blues: Future considerations	
December 11, 1974	To Philadelphia Flyers: Rights to Ron Chipperfield	To California Golden Seals: George Pesut	

=== Players acquired ===
Date	Player	Former team	Via	Ref
June 13, 1974	Graham Parsons	Minnesota North Stars	Reverse draft (Note: Selected by the Richmond Robins, the Flyers' AHL affiliate.)	

=== Players lost ===
Date	Player	New team	Via	Ref
June 4, 1974	Barry Ashbee		Retirement	
June 10, 1974	Dave Fortier	New York Islanders	Intra-league draft	
June 12, 1974	Michel Belhumeur	Washington Capitals	Expansion draft	
June 12, 1974	Bruce Cowick	Washington Capitals	Expansion draft	
June 12, 1974	Simon Nolet	Kansas City Scouts	Expansion draft	
June 13, 1974	Rene Drolet	Tidewater Wings (AHL)	Reverse draft	

=== Signings ===
Date	Player	Term	Ref
June 11, 1974	Bob Sirois	multi-year	
June 20, 1974	Bill Barber	multi-year	
June 20, 1974	Norm Barnes	multi-year	
June 20, 1974	Tom Bladon	multi-year	
June 20, 1974	Reggie Leach	multi-year	
June 20, 1974	Don McLean	multi-year	
June 20, 1974	Randy Osburn	multi-year	
June 20, 1974	Graham Parsons	multi-year	
August 27, 1974	Steve Short	multi-year	

== Draft picks ==
Philadelphia's picks at the 1974 NHL amateur draft, which was held via conference call at the NHL's office in Montreal, on May 28, 1974. The Flyers first-round pick, 17th overall, was traded to the California Golden Seals along with Al MacAdam and Larry Wright for Reggie Leach on May 24, 1974.

Round	Pick	Player	Position	Nationality	Team (league)
2	35	Don McLean	Defense	Canada	Sudbury Wolves (OHA)
3	53	Bob Sirois	Right wing	Canada	Montreal Red White and Blue (QMJHL)
4	71	Randy Andreachuk	Center	Canada	Kamloops Chiefs (WCHL)
5	89	Dennis Sobchuk	Center	Canada	Regina Pats (WCHL)
6	107	Willie Friesen	Left wing	Canada	Swift Current Broncos (WCHL)
7	125	Rejean Lemelin	Goaltender	Canada	Sherbrooke Beavers (QMJHL)
8	142	Steve Short	Left wing	United States	Minnesota Junior Stars (MJHL)
9	159	Peter McKenzie	Defense	Canada	St. Francis Xavier University (CIAU)
10	174	Marcel Labrosse	Center	Canada	Shawinigan Dynamos (QMJHL)
11	189	Scott Jessee	Right wing	United States	Michigan Tech University (WCHA)
12	201	Richard Guay	Goaltender	Canada	Chicoutimi Saguenéens (QMJHL)
13	211	Brad Morrow	Defense	United States	University of Minnesota (WCHA)
14	219	Craig Arvidson	Left wing	United States	University of Minnesota Duluth (WCHA)

== Farm teams ==
The Flyers were affiliated with the Richmond Robins of the AHL and the Philadelphia Firebirds of the NAHL. The Flyers and the expansion Washington Capitals had a joint affiliation agreement with Richmond and both teams sent players there. Richmond finished second in their division and lost in seven games to the Hershey Bears in the first round of the playoffs. Playing in the Pennsylvania Convention Center, the first-year Firebirds finished second in the league but lost in the first round of the playoffs to the Long Island Cougars.
