= Kelly Pratt =

Kelly Pratt may refer to:

- Kelly Pratt (ice hockey) (born 1953), ice hockey player
- Kelly Pratt (musician), multi-instrumentalist and member of the bands Beirut and Arcade Fire
