= 1974–75 New York Islanders season =

NHL hockey team season

1974–75 New York Islanders
- Division: 3rd Patrick
- Conference: 3rd Campbell
- 1974–75 record: 33–25–22
- Home record: 22–6–12
- Road record: 11–19–10
- Goals for: 264
- Goals against: 221

Team information
- General manager: Bill Torrey
- Coach: Al Arbour
- Captain: Ed Westfall
- Alternate captains: Billy Harris; Bert Marshall; Ralph Stewart
- Arena: Nassau Coliseum

Team leaders
- Goals: Bob Nystrom (27)
- Assists: Denis Potvin (55)
- Points: Denis Potvin (76)
- Penalty minutes: Gerry Hart (143)
- Wins: Billy Smith (21)
- Goals against average: Chico Resch (2.47)

The 1974–75 New York Islanders season was the third season for the franchise in the National Hockey League (NHL). During the regular season, the Islanders finished in third place in the Patrick Division with a 33–25–22 record and qualified for the Stanley Cup playoffs for the first time in the franchise's history. In the first round of the playoffs, New York defeated the New York Rangers in three games to advance to the Quarter-finals, where the team defeated the Pittsburgh Penguins in seven games, after they had lost the first three. The team almost repeated the feat in the next round, but lost in the semi-finals to the Philadelphia Flyers in seven games. In doing so, they set a record for most consecutive games won when facing elimination with eight.

== Regular season ==
=== Season standings ===
Patrick Division
		GP	W	L	T	GF	GA	DIFF	Pts
1	Philadelphia Flyers	80	51	18	11	293	181	+112	113
2	New York Rangers	80	37	29	14	319	276	+43	88
3	New York Islanders	80	33	25	22	264	221	+43	88
4	Atlanta Flames	80	34	31	15	243	233	+10	83

=== Record vs. opponents ===
Patrick Division record vs. opponents

Vs. Campbell Conference

Vs. Wales Conference

Vs. Patrick Division

1974–75 NHL records
Team	ATL	NYI	NYR	PHI	Total
Atlanta	—	2–1–3	3–3	2–3–1	7–7–4
N.Y. Islanders	1–2–3	—	2–3–1	1–3–2	4–8–6
N.Y. Rangers	3–3	3–2–1	—	2–3–1	8–8–2
Philadelphia	3–2–1	3–1–2	3–2–1	—	9–5–4

Vs. Smythe Division

1974–75 NHL records
Team	CHI	KCS	MIN	STL	VAN	Total
Atlanta	2–3	4–0–1	3–1–1	2–3	1–2–2	12–9–4
N.Y. Islanders	1–1–3	4–1	4–0–1	2–2–1	1–2–2	12–6–7
N.Y. Rangers	3–1–1	4–0–1	4–1	3–1–1	3–2	17–5–3
Philadelphia	4–1	4–0–1	4–1	3–2	4–1	19–5–1

Vs. Adams Division

1974–75 NHL records
Team	BOS	BUF	CAL	TOR	Total
Atlanta	0–4–1	2–1–1	2–2	3–1	7–8–2
N.Y. Islanders	2–2	0–2–2	2–1–1	2–2–1	6–7–4
N.Y. Rangers	1–3	1–4	2–0–2	1–2–1	5–9–3
Philadelphia	1–2–1	3–0–1	3–2	3–0–1	10–4–3

Vs. Norris Division

1974–75 NHL records
Team	DET	LAK	MTL	PIT	WSH	Total
Atlanta	2–2	2–1–1	0–3–1	1–1–2	3–0–1	8–7–5
N.Y. Islanders	2–2	1–0–3	2–0–2	2–2	4–0	11–4–5
N.Y. Rangers	2–1–1	1–1–2	0–2–2	2–2	2–1–1	7–7–6
Philadelphia	2–1–1	2–1–1	2–1–1	3–1	4–0	13–4–3

== Schedule and results ==
1974–75 regular season
October

Game	Result	Date	Score	Opponent	Record
1	T	October 9, 1974	5–5	@ Montreal Canadiens (1974–75)	0–0–1
2	W	October 12, 1974	6–2	Kansas City Scouts (1974–75)	1–0–1
3	W	October 15, 1974	6–3	Montreal Canadiens (1974–75)	2–0–1
4	L	October 19, 1974	2–4	New York Rangers (1974–75)	2–1–1
5	W	October 20, 1974	5–0	@ Washington Capitals (1974–75)	3–1–1
6	W	October 22, 1974	2–1	Atlanta Flames (1974–75)	4–1–1
7	W	October 26, 1974	4–0	Minnesota North Stars (1974–75)	5–1–1
8	W	October 28, 1974	10–1	California Golden Seals (1974–75)	6–1–1
9	T	October 30, 1974	1–1	@ New York Rangers (1974–75)	6–1–2

November

Game	Result	Date	Score	Opponent	Record
10	W	November 2, 1974	3–2	Boston Bruins (1974–75)	7–1–2
11	L	November 3, 1974	1–3	@ Philadelphia Flyers (1974–75)	7–2–2
12	T	November 5, 1974	4–4	Philadelphia Flyers (1974–75)	7–2–3
13	L	November 6, 1974	1–2	@ Atlanta Flames (1974–75)	7–3–3
14	L	November 9, 1974	2–4	@ St. Louis Blues (1974–75)	7–4–3
15	L	November 13, 1974	2–8	@ Pittsburgh Penguins (1974–75)	7–5–3
16	L	November 15, 1974	2–4	@ Kansas City Scouts (1974–75)	7–6–3
17	L	November 16, 1974	3–5	@ Detroit Red Wings (1974–75)	7–7–3
18	W	November 19, 1974	4–3	Pittsburgh Penguins (1974–75)	8–7–3
19	T	November 20, 1974	4–4	@ Chicago Black Hawks (1974–75)	8–7–4
20	W	November 22, 1974	6–0	Toronto Maple Leafs (1974–75)	9–7–4
21	T	November 23, 1974	3–3	Vancouver Canucks (1974–75)	9–7–5
22	T	November 27, 1974	3–3	@ Los Angeles Kings (1974–75)	9–7–6
23	T	November 29, 1974	3–3	@ California Golden Seals (1974–75)	9–7–7
24	L	November 30, 1974	0–3	@ Vancouver Canucks (1974–75)	9–8–7

December

Game	Result	Date	Score	Opponent	Record
25	T	December 5, 1974	3–3	Toronto Maple Leafs (1974–75)	9–8–8
26	W	December 7, 1974	4–1	Kansas City Scouts (1974–75)	10–8–8
27	L	December 8, 1974	2–3	@ Philadelphia Flyers (1974–75)	10–9–8
28	W	December 10, 1974	3–2	St. Louis Blues (1974–75)	11–9–8
29	W	December 14, 1974	3–0	Los Angeles Kings (1974–75)	12–9–8
30	L	December 15, 1974	2–5	@ Boston Bruins (1974–75)	12–10–8
31	L	December 17, 1974	4–8	@ St. Louis Blues (1974–75)	12–11–8
32	L	December 18, 1974	2–3	@ Buffalo Sabres (1974–75)	12–12–8
33	T	December 21, 1974	3–3	Chicago Black Hawks (1974–75)	12–12–9
34	W	December 22, 1974	5–2	@ Kansas City Scouts (1974–75)	13–12–9
35	L	December 26, 1974	1–2	@ Atlanta Flames (1974–75)	13–13–9
36	L	December 28, 1974	1–3	@ Toronto Maple Leafs (1974–75)	13–14–9
37	W	December 29, 1974	7–0	@ Washington Capitals (1974–75)	14–14–9

January

Game	Result	Date	Score	Opponent	Record
38	W	January 2, 1975	5–2	Washington Capitals (1974–75)	15–14–9
39	L	January 4, 1975	3–5	New York Rangers (1974–75)	15–15–9
40	W	January 7, 1975	5–3	Toronto Maple Leafs (1974–75)	16–15–9
41	W	January 9, 1975	3–1	@ Philadelphia Flyers (1974–75)	17–15–9
42	T	January 11, 1975	2–2	Atlanta Flames (1974–75)	17–15–10
43	L	January 12, 1975	3–4	@ Toronto Maple Leafs (1974–75)	17–16–10
44	T	January 14, 1975	3–3	St. Louis Blues (1974–75)	17–16–11
45	W	January 18, 1975	5–1	Detroit Red Wings (1974–75)	18–16–11
46	L	January 23, 1975	1–3	@ Chicago Black Hawks (1974–75)	18–17–11
47	T	January 25, 1975	5–5	Los Angeles Kings (1974–75)	18–17–12
48	W	January 28, 1975	6–2	Minnesota North Stars (1974–75)	19–17–12
49	W	January 29, 1975	4–3	@ Minnesota North Stars (1974–75)	20–17–12

February

Game	Result	Date	Score	Opponent	Record
50	W	February 1, 1975	4–1	@ Detroit Red Wings (1974–75)	21–17–12
51	T	February 2, 1975	1–1	@ Chicago Black Hawks (1974–75)	21–17–13
52	T	February 6, 1975	2–2	Buffalo Sabres (1974–75)	21–17–14
53	W	February 8, 1975	5–1	Washington Capitals (1974–75)	22–17–14
54	L	February 9, 1975	1–5	@ Boston Bruins (1974–75)	22–18–14
55	W	February 11, 1975	2–1	Pittsburgh Penguins (1974–75)	23–18–14
56	W	February 12, 1975	4–2	@ Minnesota North Stars (1974–75)	24–18–14
57	T	February 15, 1975	1–1	Philadelphia Flyers (1974–75)	24–18–15
58	L	February 16, 1975	2–3	@ Pittsburgh Penguins (1974–75)	24–19–15
59	L	February 18, 1975	2–3	Buffalo Sabres (1974–75)	24–20–15
60	L	February 21, 1975	1–4	Vancouver Canucks (1974–75)	24–21–15
61	W	February 22, 1975	7–6	@ Montreal Canadiens (1974–75)	25–21–15
62	W	February 25, 1975	3–0	St. Louis Blues (1974–75)	26–21–15

March

Game	Result	Date	Score	Opponent	Record
63	W	March 1, 1975	6–1	California Golden Seals (1974–75)	27–21–15
64	T	March 2, 1975	3–3	@ Buffalo Sabres (1974–75)	27–21–16
65	T	March 6, 1975	2–2	@ Los Angeles Kings (1974–75)	27–21–17
66	W	March 8, 1975	7–5	@ Vancouver Canucks (1974–75)	28–21–17
67	L	March 9, 1975	2–4	@ California Golden Seals (1974–75)	28–22–17
68	L	March 11, 1975	2–4	Detroit Red Wings (1974–75)	28–23–17
69	L	March 12, 1975	3–5	@ New York Rangers (1974–75)	28–24–17
70	W	March 15, 1975	3–1	Boston Bruins (1974–75)	29–24–17
71	T	March 18, 1975	4–4	Vancouver Canucks (1974–75)	29–24–18
72	W	March 19, 1975	3–1	@ Kansas City Scouts (1974–75)	30–24–18
73	W	March 22, 1975	4–2	Chicago Black Hawks (1974–75)	31–24–18
74	T	March 23, 1975	3–3	@ Minnesota North Stars (1974–75)	31–24–19
75	T	March 25, 1975	3–3	Montreal Canadiens (1974–75)	31–24–20
76	W	March 29, 1975	6–4	New York Rangers (1974–75)	32–24–20
77	T	March 30, 1975	2–2	@ Atlanta Flames (1974–75)	32–24–21

April

Game	Result	Date	Score	Opponent	Record
78	T	April 1, 1975	2–2	Atlanta Flames (1974–75)	32–24–22
79	L	April 5, 1975	1–4	Philadelphia Flyers (1974–75)	32–25–22
80	W	April 6, 1975	6–4	@ New York Rangers (1974–75)	33–25–22

Legend: Win (2 points) Loss (0 points) Tie (1 point)

== Playoffs ==
Round 1 (5) New York Islanders vs. (4) New York Rangers

Game #	Away	Home	Score
1	New York Islanders	New York Rangers	3–2
2	New York Rangers	New York Islanders	8–3
3	New York Islanders	New York Rangers	4–3 (OT)

New York Islanders Win Series 2–1

Round 2 (5) New York Islanders vs (4) Pittsburgh Penguins

Game #	Away	Home	Score
1	New York Islanders	Pittsburgh Penguins	4–5
2	New York Islanders	Pittsburgh Penguins	1–3
3	Pittsburgh Penguins	New York Islanders	6–4
4	Pittsburgh Penguins	New York Islanders	1–3
5	New York Islanders	Pittsburgh Penguins	4–2
6	Pittsburgh Penguins	New York Islanders	1–4
7	New York Islanders	Pittsburgh Penguins	1–0

New York Wins Series 4–3

Round 3 (5) New York Islanders vs (1) Philadelphia Flyers

Game #	Away	Home	Score
1	New York Islanders	Philadelphia Flyers	0–4
2	New York Islanders	Philadelphia Flyers	4–5 (OT)
3	Philadelphia Flyers	New York Islanders	1–0
4	Philadelphia Flyers	New York Islanders	3–4 (OT)
5	New York Islanders	Philadelphia Flyers	5–1
6	Philadelphia Flyers	New York Islanders	1–2
7	New York Islanders	Philadelphia Flyers	1–4

New York Loses Series 4–3

== Player statistics ==
Regular season
Scoring

Player	Pos	GP	G	A	Pts	PIM	+/-	PPG	SHG	GWG
Denis Potvin	D	79	21	55	76	105	28	5	2	4
Billy Harris	RW	80	25	37	62	34	4	4	0	5
Bob Nystrom	RW	76	27	28	55	122	17	3	0	3
Ed Westfall	D/RW	73	22	33	55	28	19	6	1	1
Garry Howatt	LW	77	18	30	48	121	32	1	0	3
Clark Gillies	LW	80	25	22	47	66	−4	8	0	4
Andre St. Laurent	C	78	14	27	41	60	22	1	0	0
Ralph Stewart	C	70	16	24	40	12	−9	6	1	2
Bob Bourne	C	77	16	23	39	12	9	2	0	2
Jean Potvin	D	73	9	24	33	59	−3	6	1	4
Jude Drouin	C	40	14	18	32	6	8	2	0	2
J.P. Parise	LW	41	14	16	30	22	10	4	0	1
Bert Marshall	D	77	2	28	30	58	18	0	0	0
Billy MacMillan	RW	69	13	12	25	12	0	2	1	1
Dave Lewis	D	78	5	14	19	98	8	0	0	1
Dave Fortier	D	65	6	12	18	79	14	1	0	0
Gerry Hart	D	71	4	14	18	143	28	0	1	0
Lorne Henning	C	60	5	6	11	6	7	0	4	0
Doug Rombough	C	28	5	6	11	6	6	0	0	0
Ernie Hicke	LW	20	2	6	8	40	7	0	0	0
Craig Cameron	RW	37	1	6	7	4	−3	0	0	0
Walt Ledingham	LW	2	0	1	1	0	−3	0	0	0
Tom Miller	C	1	0	0	0	0	0	0	0	0
Chico Resch	G	25	0	0	0	0	0	0	0	0
Billy Smith	G	58	0	0	0	21	0	0	0	0

Goaltending

Player	MIN	GP	W	L	T	GA	GAA	SO
Billy Smith	3368	58	21	18	17	156	2.78	3
Chico Resch	1432	25	12	7	5	59	2.47	3
Team:	4800	80	33	25	22	215	2.69	6

Playoffs
Scoring

Player	Pos	GP	G	A	Pts	PIM	PPG	SHG	GWG
Jude Drouin	C	17	6	12	18	6	1	0	1
J.P. Parise	LW	17	8	8	16	22	4	0	1
Ed Westfall	D/RW	17	5	10	15	12	2	1	2
Denis Potvin	D	17	5	9	14	30	3	1	0
Billy Harris	RW	17	3	7	10	12	2	0	1
Bert Marshall	D	17	2	5	7	16	0	0	0
Clark Gillies	LW	17	4	2	6	36	0	0	2
Garry Howatt	LW	17	3	3	6	59	0	0	1
Ralph Stewart	C	13	3	3	6	2	1	0	0
Jean Potvin	D	15	2	4	6	9	0	0	0
Gerry Hart	D	17	2	2	4	42	0	0	1
Andre St. Laurent	C	15	2	2	4	6	1	0	0
Bob Nystrom	RW	17	1	3	4	27	0	0	0
Bob Bourne	C	9	1	2	3	4	1	0	0
Dave Fortier	D	14	0	2	2	33	0	0	0
Lorne Henning	C	17	0	2	2	0	0	0	0
Dave Lewis	D	17	0	1	1	28	0	0	0
Billy MacMillan	RW	17	0	1	1	23	0	0	0
Chico Resch	G	12	0	0	0	4	0	0	0
Billy Smith	G	6	0	0	0	6	0	0	0

Goaltending

Player	MIN	GP	W	L	GA	GAA	SO
Chico Resch	692	12	8	4	25	2.17	1
Billy Smith	333	6	1	4	23	4.14	0
Team:	1025	17	9	8	48	2.81	1

Note: Pos = Position; GP = Games played; G = Goals; A = Assists; Pts = Points; +/- = plus/minus; PIM = Penalty minutes; PPG = Power-play goals; SHG = Short-handed goals; GWG = Game-winning goals
MIN = Minutes played; W = Wins; L = Losses; T = Ties; GA = Goals-against; GAA = Goals-against average; SO = Shutouts;

== Draft picks ==
The 1974 NHL amateur draft was held via conference call at the NHL office in Montreal. Below are listed the selections of the New York Islanders:

Pick #	Player	Position	Nationality	College/junior/club team
4	Clark Gillies	Forward	Canada	Regina Pats (WCHL)
22	Bryan Trottier	Center	Canada	Swift Current Broncos (WCHL)
40	Brad Anderson	Center	Canada	Victoria Cougars (WCHL)
76	Carlo Torresan	Defense	Canada	Sorel Eperviers (QMJHL)
94	Sid Prysunka	Left wing	Canada	New Westminster Bruins (WCHL)
112	Dave Langevin	Defense	United States	University of Minnesota Duluth (WCHA)
129	Dave Inkpen	Defense	Canada	Edmonton Oil Kings (WCHL)
146	Jim Foubister	Goaltender	Canada	Victoria Cougars (WCHL)
163	Bob Ferguson	Center	Canada	Cornwall Royals (QMJHL)
178	Murray Fleck	Defense	Canada	Estevan Bruins (SJHL)
192	Dave Rooke	Defense	Canada	Cornwall Royals (QMJHL)
204	Neil Smith	Defense	Canada	Brockville Braves (CJHL)
214	Stefan Persson	Defense	Sweden	Brynäs IF (Sweden)
221	Dave Otness	Center	United States	University of Wisconsin (WCHA)
226	Jim Murray	Defense	Canada	Michigan Technological University (WCHA)
229	Mike Dibble	Goaltender	United States	University of Wisconsin (WCHA)
232	Brian Bye	Left wing	Canada	Kitchener Rangers (OMJHL)
235	Martti Jarkko	Center	Finland	Tappara Tampere (Finland)
238	Ron Phillips	Defense	Canada	St. Catharines Black Hawks (OMJHL)
^{Reference: "1974 NHL amateur draft hockeydraftcentral.com".}

== See also ==
- 1974–75 NHL season
