= 1974–75 Buffalo Sabres season =

NHL hockey team season

1974–75 Buffalo Sabres
- Wales Conference champions
- Adams Division champions
- Division: 1st Adams
- Conference: 1st Wales
- 1974–75 record: 49–16–15
- Home record: 28–6–6
- Road record: 21–10–9
- Goals for: 354
- Goals against: 240

Team information
- General manager: Punch Imlach
- Coach: Floyd Smith
- Captain: Jim Schoenfeld
- Alternate captains: Gilbert Perreault; Don Luce; Jim Lorentz
- Arena: Buffalo Memorial Auditorium
- Average attendance: 15,668

Team leaders
- Goals: Rick Martin (52)
- Assists: Rene Robert (60)
- Points: Rene Robert (100)
- Penalty minutes: Jerry Korab and Jim Schoenfeld (184)
- Wins: Gary Bromley (26)
- Goals against average: Roger Crozier (2.62)

The 1974–75 Buffalo Sabres season was the Sabres' fifth season in the National Hockey League (NHL). The Sabres finished in a tie for the best record in the NHL in the 1974–75 regular season after a disappointing 1974 that saw the 1973–74 team fail to return to the NHL playoffs as they had the year before. Buffalo advanced to the Stanley Cup finals for the first time in team history to play against the rough Philadelphia Flyers (who had been recently nicknamed the "Broad Street Bullies"), a series which included the legendary Fog Game (game three of the series). The Sabres lost the series 4–2.

The season marked the Sabres' second NHL playoffs appearance. The season was the first under the tenure of Floyd Smith and the team's first in the newly created Adams Division in the NHL's Prince of Wales Conference.

Sabres players earned numerous accolades. Don Luce won the Bill Masterton Memorial Trophy. Rick Martin, Rene Robert, Jerry Korab and Luce were all selected to the 1975 NHL All-Star Game. Martin was a first team NHL All-Star team selection at left wing, while Robert was a second team selection at right wing. The French Connection (Martin, Robert and Gilbert Perreault) were all among the league leaders in important scoring statistics.

== Transactions ==
Goaltender Dave Dryden was lost to the World Hockey Association following the 1973–74 season. During the 25-round May 1974 NHL amateur draft that was held by conference call, the team participated in the first twelve rounds of the draft. Although several of their selections eventually played in the NHL, the Sabres only drafted three players that played for the team that year. The Sabres acquired defenseman Lee Fogolin (1st round, 11th overall), right winger Danny Gare (2nd round, 29th overall) and defenseman Paul McIntosh (4th round, 65th overall) in the 1974 NHL amateur draft. They had acquired left winger Morris Titanic in the 1973 NHL amateur draft (1st round, 12th overall) and he was called up from the team's American Hockey League minor league affiliate, the Hershey Bears during the season. In addition, the Sabres drafted fictional Japanese forward Taro Tsujimoto with the 183rd overall pick, presenting the protest selection as real until well into training camp that year.

Round	#	Player	Nationality	College/Junior/Club team
1	11	Lee Fogolin (D)	United States	Oshawa Generals (OHA)
2	29	Danny Gare (RW)	Canada	Calgary Centennials (WCJHL)
3	47	Michel Deziel (LW)	Canada	Sorel Eperviers (QMJHL)
4	65	Paul McIntosh (D)	Canada	Peterborough Petes (OHA)
5	83	Garry Lariviere (D)	Canada	St. Catharines Black Hawks (OMJHL)
6	101	Dave Given (RW)	United States	Brown University (ECAC)
7	119	Bernard Noreau (RW)	Canada	Laval National (QMJHL)
8	136	Charles Constantin (LW)	Canada	Quebec Remparts (QMJHL)
9	153	Rick Jodzio (LW)	Canada	Hamilton Fincups (OMJHL)
10	168	Derek Smith (LW)	Canada	Ottawa 67's (OMJHL)
11	183	Taro Tsujimoto (C)	Japan	Tokyo Katanas (JIHL)
12	196	Bob Geoffrion (LW)	Canada	Cornwall Royals (QMJHL)

Prior to the season, the team had lost right winger Ron Busniuk to the Detroit Red Wings in the June 10, 1974 NHL intra-league draft. Buffalo lost right winger Steve Atkinson and center Randy Wyrozub to the Washington Capitals in the June 12, 1974 NHL expansion draft. The team also lost defenseman Paul Terbenche to the Kansas City Scouts in the same draft.

On October 14, 1974, The Sabres acquired 1974 All-Star defenseman Jocelyn Guevremont and forward Bryan McSheffrey from the Vancouver Canucks in exchange for left winger Gerry Meehan and defenseman Mike Robitaille. On January 27, 1975, Buffalo acquired left winger Fred Stanfield from the Minnesota North Stars for right winger Norm Gratton and Buffalo's 3rd round choice in 1976 NHL amateur draft. The veteran Stanfield had finished in the top ten in the league four times in assists before being acquired by the Sabres. The Sabres acquired the NHL rights to goaltender Gerry Desjardins from the New York Islanders for defenseman Garry Lariviere on February 19, 1975.

In May, after the season ended, left winger Rick Dudley, who later coached the Sabres for three seasons, signed to play in the WHA. After 11 seasons in the NHL, 1974–75 was the final one for right winger Larry Mickey before his retirement.

== Regular season ==
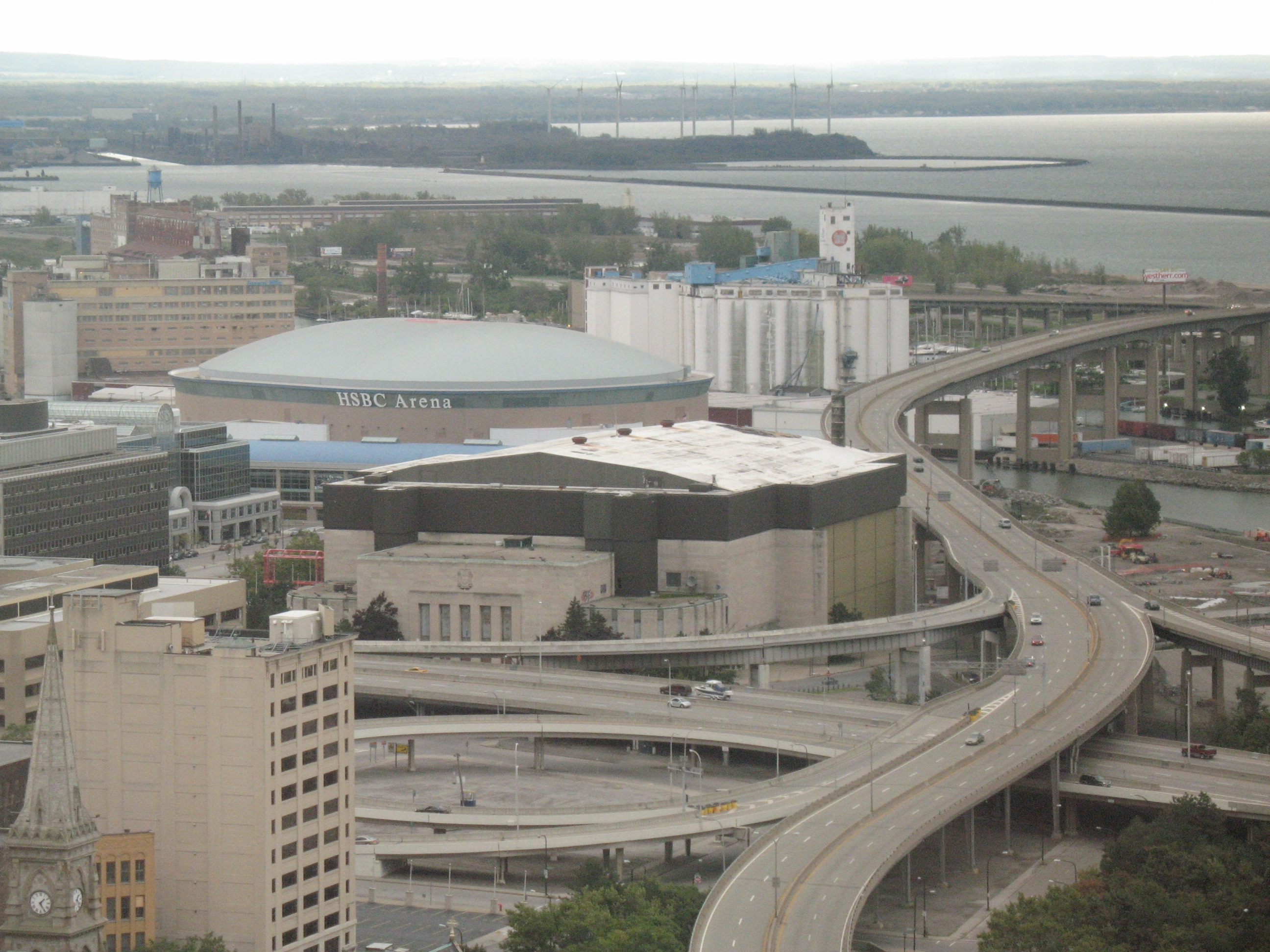
The Sabres played their home games in the Buffalo Memorial Auditorium (dark rimmed building in front of the HSBC Arena, pictured in 2007).

October–December

The Sabres returned after a season of injury and tragedy in which their captain Tim Horton died in an automobile accident. The team also seemed to have mended an apparent preseason feud between Perreault and Martin. On October 10, 1974, in the season-opening game, Danny Gare set the tone for the new season by scoring a goal 18 seconds into the first game of his career. Perreault added a hat trick and two assists in the 9–5 victory over the Boston Bruins. After starting the season 3–3–1, the Sabres had an 18–1–3 hot streak between October 26 and December 8, 1974, to move to a 21–4–4 record. By the time they reached 7–3–1 following a November 3 victory over the New York Rangers, they had taken over the Adams Division lead. The streak included two unbeaten stretches of at least 10 games. They went 9–0–1 on a streak that extended until November 14 with a win against the Minnesota North Stars. The penultimate win of the streak was the Sabres' first ever win at the Montreal Forum on November 13.

After a November 16, loss to the Bruins, they started a 9–0–2 streak on November 17 against the Atlanta Flames. In the third game of this streak, which was also against the Flames, they made a comeback from two separate three-goal deficits to tie the game. The other tie during the streak was also a comeback. By the end of the two unbeaten streaks and before the 30-game mark, the Sabres had the best record in the NHL, the league's leading scorer in Perreault, three 20-goal scorers among the French Connection and the leading rookie scorer in the league in Gare. Martin had the second four-goal game of his career in a December 3 5–3 victory against the Washington Capitals on the road. Perreault had three goals and an assist in the December 5 9–2 victory against the Washington Capitals at home. Then, Martin was lost with a recurring thumb injury. Following Martin's injury, the Sabres eleven-game unbeaten streak came to an end, and the team had two different three-game stretches without a win that started in December.

January–February

The team posted a season high six-game win streak between January 12, 1975 – January 25, 1975. The streak culminated in a second win against the Montreal Canadiens on the road. After a February 1 loss to the Philadelphia Flyers, the Sabres went undefeated for the rest of the month. The team had a season-high 12-game unbeaten streak between February 2, 1975 – February 27, 1975. During that streak, the team went 7–0–5. The 4–4 February 16 tie with the St. Louis Blues clinched a playoff spot for the Sabres. The February 18 3–2 victory over the New York Islanders at the Nassau Coliseum was only the second loss of the season for the Islanders at home. The February 20 6–6 tie against the Flyers, in which the Sabres lost several leads, extended the Flyers unbeaten streak against the Sabres to nine. The final game of the streak was a 5–0 shutout victory over the Los Angeles Kings, who had handed the Sabres three of their eleven defeats prior to that point in the season.

March–April

At the beginning of March, Desjardins quit the Baltimore Blades of the World Hockey Association to join the Sabres. Desjardins was frustrated at not getting paid when attendance was sparse. On March 16 against the Toronto Maple Leafs, Martin dislocated his thumb during a fight. This necessitated that he wear a cast. Desjardins made his first appearance in a March 20 6–3 victory over the New York Rangers. In their last win of the month, the Sabres clinched the division title on March 23 with a 9–4 victory over the California Golden Seals. Rookie defenseman Hajt was injured with a broken bone in his foot during a 5–1 loss to the Chicago Blackhawks on March 26. The Sabres would lose the next two games for the season's only three-game losing streak. The Sabres ended the season by winning all three regular season games in April. The Sabres did not clinch the Prince of Wales Conference until winning the final game of the season against the Maple Leafs.

The season was the first of three full seasons coached by Floyd Smith, who had coached one game during the 1971–72 season. Smith had played for the Sabres during their first two seasons. The team played its home games at Buffalo Memorial Auditorium. Two members of the team later coached the Sabres: Dudley and Jim Schoenfeld.

=== Season standings ===
Adams Division
		GP	W	L	T	GF	GA	DIFF	Pts
1	Buffalo Sabres	80	49	16	15	354	240	+114	113
2	Boston Bruins	80	40	26	14	345	245	+100	94
3	Toronto Maple Leafs	80	31	33	16	280	309	−29	78
4	California Golden Seals	80	19	48	13	212	316	−104	51

=== Record vs. opponents ===
Adams Division record vs. opponents

Vs. Wales Conference

Vs. Campbell Conference

Vs. Adams Division

1974–75 NHL records
Team	BOS	BUF	CAL	TOR	Total
Boston	—	1–4–1	4–2	1–2–3	6–8–4
Buffalo	4–1–1	—	4–0–2	4–1–1	12–2–4
California	2–4	0–4–2	—	1–3–2	3–11–4
Toronto	2–1–3	1–4–1	3–1–2	—	6–6–6

Vs. Norris Division

1974–75 NHL records
Team	DET	LAK	MTL	PIT	WSH	Total
Boston	4–1	2–3	0–3–2	2–1–2	4–0–1	12–8–5
Buffalo	3–1–1	1–3–1	4–0–1	3–0–2	5–0	16–4–5
California	2–2–1	1–2–2	0–5	0–4–1	3–2	6–15–4
Toronto	3–1–1	0–4–1	2–1–2	1–4	4–1	10–11–4

Vs. Patrick Division

1974–75 NHL records
Team	ATL	NYI	NYR	PHI	Total
Boston	4–0–1	2–2	3–1	2–1–1	11–4–2
Buffalo	1–2–1	2–0–2	4–1	0–3–1	7–6–4
California	2–2	1–2–1	0–2–2	2–3	5–9–3
Toronto	1–3	2–2–1	2–1–1	0–3–1	5–9–3

Vs. Smythe Division

1974–75 NHL records
Team	CHI	KCS	MIN	STL	VAN	Total
Boston	2–2	2–1–1	3–0–1	1–2–1	3–1	11–6–3
Buffalo	3–1	4–0	3–1	2–0–2	2–2	14–4–2
California	1–3	1–2–1	1–3	2–1–1	0–4	5–13–2
Toronto	2–2	2–1–1	3–1	2–0–2	1–3	10–7–3

=== Results ===
The following is a Sabres game log.

1974–75 regular season
October

Game	Result	Date	Score	Opponent	Record
1	W	October 10, 1974	9–5	Boston Bruins (1974–75)	1–0–0
2	L	October 12, 1974	1–6	@ Philadelphia Flyers (1974–75)	1–1–0
3	L	October 13, 1974	1–4	Los Angeles Kings (1974–75)	1–2–0
4	W	October 17, 1974	6–1	California Golden Seals (1974–75)	2–2–0
5	W	October 18, 1974	2–1	@ Minnesota North Stars (1974–75)	3–2–0
6	T	October 20, 1974	5–5	Toronto Maple Leafs (1974–75)	3–2–1
7	L	October 24, 1974	2–7	@ Los Angeles Kings (1974–75)	3–3–1
8	W	October 26, 1974	2–0	@ St. Louis Blues (1974–75)	4–3–1
9	W	October 27, 1974	3–2	Montreal Canadiens (1974–75)	5–3–1

November

Game	Result	Date	Score	Opponent	Record
10	W	November 2, 1974	6–3	@ Toronto Maple Leafs (1974–75)	6–3–1
11	W	November 3, 1974	4–3	@ New York Rangers (1974–75)	7–3–1
12	T	November 5, 1974	2–2	@ Boston Bruins (1974–75)	7–3–2
13	W	November 6, 1974	6–4	Chicago Black Hawks (1974–75)	8–3–2
14	W	November 9, 1974	6–1	@ Kansas City Scouts (1974–75)	9–3–2
15	W	November 10, 1974	8–3	Pittsburgh Penguins (1974–75)	10–3–2
16	W	November 13, 1974	8–6	@ Montreal Canadiens (1974–75)	11–3–2
17	W	November 14, 1974	5–3	Minnesota North Stars (1974–75)	12–3–2
18	L	November 16, 1974	5–7	@ Boston Bruins (1974–75)	12–4–2
19	W	November 17, 1974	4–0	Atlanta Flames (1974–75)	13–4–2
20	W	November 20, 1974	7–3	Washington Capitals (1974–75)	14–4–2
21	T	November 22, 1974	4–4	@ Atlanta Flames (1974–75)	14–4–3
22	W	November 24, 1974	6–4	Montreal Canadiens (1974–75)	15–4–3
23	W	November 27, 1974	3–1	@ Chicago Black Hawks (1974–75)	16–4–3
24	W	November 28, 1974	5–2	Detroit Red Wings (1974–75)	17–4–3
25	T	November 30, 1974	5–5	@ Pittsburgh Penguins (1974–75)	17–4–4

December

Game	Result	Date	Score	Opponent	Record
26	W	December 1, 1974	6–3	Pittsburgh Penguins (1974–75)	18–4–4
27	W	December 3, 1974	5–3	@ Washington Capitals (1974–75)	19–4–4
28	W	December 5, 1974	9–2	Washington Capitals (1974–75)	20–4–4
29	W	December 8, 1974	5–0	Minnesota North Stars (1974–75)	21–4–4
30	L	December 12, 1974	3–5	Vancouver Canucks (1974–75)	21–5–4
31	L	December 14, 1974	2–4	@ Minnesota North Stars (1974–75)	21–6–4
32	T	December 15, 1974	5–5	California Golden Seals (1974–75)	21–6–5
33	W	December 18, 1974	3–2	New York Islanders (1974–75)	22–6–5
34	W	December 22, 1974	4–0	@ Washington Capitals (1974–75)	23–6–5
35	W	December 26, 1974	3–1	Chicago Black Hawks (1974–75)	24–6–5
36	L	December 27, 1974	5–9	@ New York Rangers (1974–75)	24–7–5
37	L	December 29, 1974	2–5	Philadelphia Flyers (1974–75)	24–8–5

January

Game	Result	Date	Score	Opponent	Record
38	T	January 3, 1975	2–2	@ California Golden Seals (1974–75)	24–8–6
39	W	January 5, 1975	4–2	St. Louis Blues (1974–75)	25–8–6
40	L	January 9, 1975	2–5	Los Angeles Kings (1974–75)	25–9–6
41	T	January 11, 1975	3–3	@ Detroit Red Wings (1974–75)	25–9–7
42	W	January 12, 1975	5–1	Vancouver Canucks (1974–75)	26–9–7
43	W	January 15, 1975	4–0	@ California Golden Seals (1974–75)	27–9–7
44	W	January 17, 1975	4–2	@ Vancouver Canucks (1974–75)	28–9–7
45	W	January 19, 1975	5–0	Kansas City Scouts (1974–75)	29–9–7
46	W	January 23, 1975	5–1	Detroit Red Wings (1974–75)	30–9–7
47	W	January 25, 1975	7–6	@ Montreal Canadiens (1974–75)	31–9–7
48	L	January 26, 1975	3–4	Atlanta Flames (1974–75)	31–10–7
49	W	January 30, 1975	6–3	New York Rangers (1974–75)	32–10–7

February

Game	Result	Date	Score	Opponent	Record
50	L	February 1, 1975	0–6	@ Philadelphia Flyers (1974–75)	32–11–7
51	W	February 2, 1975	8–1	Kansas City Scouts (1974–75)	33–11–7
52	W	February 4, 1975	6–1	@ Detroit Red Wings (1974–75)	34–11–7
53	T	February 6, 1975	2–2	@ New York Islanders (1974–75)	34–11–8
54	T	February 9, 1975	4–4	Montreal Canadiens (1974–75)	34–11–9
55	T	February 12, 1975	3–3	@ Pittsburgh Penguins (1974–75)	34–11–10
56	W	February 13, 1975	3–1	Boston Bruins (1974–75)	35–11–10
57	T	February 16, 1975	4–4	St. Louis Blues (1974–75)	35–11–11
58	W	February 18, 1975	3–2	@ New York Islanders (1974–75)	36–11–11
59	T	February 20, 1975	6–6	Philadelphia Flyers (1974–75)	36–11–12
60	W	February 21, 1975	9–4	@ Washington Capitals (1974–75)	37–11–12
61	W	February 23, 1975	4–1	Toronto Maple Leafs (1974–75)	38–11–12
62	W	February 27, 1975	5–0	Los Angeles Kings (1974–75)	39–11–12

March

Game	Result	Date	Score	Opponent	Record
63	L	March 1, 1975	2–3	@ Detroit Red Wings (1974–75)	39–12–12
64	T	March 2, 1975	3–3	New York Islanders (1974–75)	39–12–13
65	W	March 5, 1975	6–3	@ New York Rangers (1974–75)	40–12–13
66	T	March 8, 1975	3–3	@ St. Louis Blues (1974–75)	40–12–14
67	W	March 9, 1975	8–4	Pittsburgh Penguins (1974–75)	41–12–14
68	T	March 11, 1975	2–2	@ Los Angeles Kings (1974–75)	41–12–15
69	W	March 12, 1975	7–2	@ California Golden Seals (1974–75)	42–12–15
70	L	March 14, 1975	1–5	@ Vancouver Canucks (1974–75)	42–13–15
71	W	March 16, 1975	11–3	@ Toronto Maple Leafs (1974–75)	43–13–15
72	W	March 20, 1975	6–3	New York Rangers (1974–75)	44–13–15
73	W	March 22, 1975	4–2	@ Kansas City Scouts (1974–75)	45–13–15
74	W	March 23, 1975	9–4	California Golden Seals (1974–75)	46–13–15
75	L	March 26, 1975	1–5	@ Chicago Black Hawks (1974–75)	46–14–15
76	L	March 28, 1975	2–3	@ Atlanta Flames (1974–75)	46–15–15
77	L	March 30, 1975	4–5	Toronto Maple Leafs (1974–75)	46–16–15

April

Game	Result	Date	Score	Opponent	Record
78	W	April 1, 1975	3–1	@ Boston Bruins (1974–75)	47–16–15
79	W	April 3, 1975	4–2	Boston Bruins (1974–75)	48–16–15
80	W	April 5, 1975	4–2	@ Toronto Maple Leafs (1974–75)	49–16–15

Legend: Win (2 points) Loss (0 points) Tie (1 point)

== Player statistics ==
The French Connection members led the Sabres in scoring by finishing 1–2–3 in both goals and points, although none of them played as many as 75 of the team's 80 games. Perreault's eight game-winning goals was fifth highest in the NHL for the season, although he only played 68 games, he finished ninth in the league in scoring with 96 points (39 goals and 57 assists). Martin also only played 68 games and finished third in goals (52) and tenth in points (95). Martin's 21 power play goals was second in the league. Robert was seventh in points (100), tenth in goals (40) and tenth in assists (60) in 74 games. Luce's 8 shorthanded goals was second and Craig Ramsay had 7, which was third. Other statistical leaders included Luce who had a 61 plus/minus, which ranked fourth and Peter McNab who led the league in shooting percentage.

Over the course of the season, the team scored a total of 354 goals, which ranked second in the 18 team league and its 49–16–15 record ranked it first in the league. The team used several goaltenders. Although Gary Bromley led the team with 26 wins in the regular season, and Roger Crozier was second with 17 wins, the team was led in the post season by Desjardins who recorded 7 of the team's 10 post season victories.

The following are the season statistics for the Sabres.

=== Key ===
Goaltenders
GP	Games played	Min	Minutes played	GA	Goals against
GAA	Goals against average	W	Wins	L	Losses
T	Ties	Svs	Saves	Pct	Save percentage
EN	Empty net goals against	SO	Shutouts	G	Goaltender

Skaters
Pos	Position	RW	Right wing	A	Assists
D	Defenceman	C	Center	P	Points
LW	Left wing	G	Goals	PIM	Penalty minutes

=== Skaters ===
#	Player name	Acquisition	Birthdate	Age	Pos	GP	G	A	P	PIM	GP	G	A	P	PIM
#	Player name	Acquisition	Birthdate	Age	Pos	Regular-season					Playoffs				
14	Rene Robert	—	December 31, 1948	25	RW	74	40	60	100	75	16	5	8	13	16
11	Gilbert Perreault	—	November 13, 1950	23	C	68	39	57	96	36	17	6	9	15	10
7	Rick Martin	—	July 26, 1951	23	LW	68	52	43	95	72	17	7	8	15	20
20	Don Luce	—	October 2, 1948	25	C	80	33	43	76	45	16	5	8	13	19
9	Rick Dudley	—	January 31, 1949	25	LW	78	31	39	70	116	10	3	1	4	26
8	Jim Lorentz	—	May 1, 1947	27	C	72	25	45	70	18	16	6	4	10	6
10	Craig Ramsay	—	March 17, 1951	23	LW	80	26	38	64	26	17	5	7	12	2
18	Danny Gare	—	May 14, 1954	20	RW	78	31	31	62	75	17	7	6	13	19
4	Jerry Korab	—	September 15, 1948	25	D	79	12	44	56	184	16	3	2	5	32
16	Peter McNab	—	May 8, 1952	22	C	53	22	21	43	8	17	2	6	8	4
21	Brian Spencer	—	September 3, 1949	24	LW	73	12	29	41	77	16	0	4	4	8
17	Fred Stanfield	From Minnesota	May 4, 1944	30	LW	32	12	21	33	4	17	2	4	6	0
22	Jocelyn Guevremont	From Vancouver	March 1, 1951	23	D	64	7	25	32	32	17	0	6	6	14
24	Bill Hajt	—	November 18, 1951	22	D	76	3	26	29	68	17	1	4	5	18
6	Jim Schoenfeld	—	September 4, 1952	21	D	68	1	19	20	184	17	1	4	5	38
23	Larry Carriere	—	January 30, 1952	22	D	80	1	11	12	111	17	0	2	2	32
	Norm Gratton	To Minnesota	December 22, 1950	23	LW	25	3	6	9	2	—	—	—	—	—
5	Lee Fogolin	—	February 15, 1955	19	D	50	2	2	4	59	8	0	0	0	6
29	Gary Bromley	—	January 19, 1950	24	G	50	0	4	4	2	—	—	—	—	—
12	Larry Mickey	—	October 21, 1943	30	RW	23	2	0	2	2	—	—	—	—	—
1	Roger Crozier	—	March 16, 1942	32	G	23	0	2	2	8	—	—	—	—	—
	Gerry Meehan	To Vancouver	September 3, 1946	27	C	3	0	1	1	2	—	—	—	—	—
	Mike Robitaille	To Vancouver	February 12, 1948	26	D	3	0	1	1	0	—	—	—	—	—
3	Paul McIntosh	—	March 13, 1954	20	D	6	0	1	1	5	1	0	0	0	0
15	Michel Deziel	—	January 31, 1954	20	LW	—	—	—	—	—	1	0	0	0	0
	Bryan McSheffrey	—	September 25, 1952	21	RW	3	0	0	0	0	—	—	—	—	—
	Rocky Farr	—	April 7, 1947	27	G	7	0	0	0	0	—	—	—	—	—
30	Gerry Desjardins	—	July 22, 1944	30	G	9	0	0	0	0	—	—	—	—	—
19	Morris Titanic	—	January 7, 1953	21	LW	17	0	0	0	0	—	—	—	—	—
	Bench Minor^{1}	—		—	—	—	—	—	—	18	—	—	—	—	0

Note 1: A bench minor is when the team is penalized for a minor infraction that is not attributed to any individual player.

=== Goaltenders ===
==== Regular season ====
Player Name	GP	Min	GA	GAA	W	L	T	Svs	Pct	EN	SO
Roger Crozier	23	1260	55	2.62	17	2	1	518	0.904	0	3
Gerry Desjardins	9	540	25	2.78	6	2	1	239	0.905	0	0
Gary Bromley	50	2787	144	3.10	26	11	11	989	0.873	2	4
Norm "Rocky" Farr	7	213	14	3.94	0	1	2	100	0.877	0	0

==== Playoffs ====
Player Name	GP	Min	GA	GAA	W	L	SO
Roger Crozier	5	292	14	2.88	3	2	0
Gerry Desjardins	15	760	43	3.39	7	5	0

== Playoffs ==
=== Schedule and results ===
The following was the team playoff schedule.

Round	Game	Date	Visitor	Score	Home	Score	OT
Preliminary round	Bye						
Quarter-finals	Game 1	13-Apr-75	Chicago Black Hawks	1	Buffalo Sabres	4	
Quarter-finals	Game 2	15-Apr-75	Chicago Black Hawks	1	Buffalo Sabres	3	
Quarter-finals	Game 3	17-Apr-75	Buffalo Sabres	4	Chicago Black Hawks	5	(OT)
Quarter-finals	Game 4	20-Apr-75	Buffalo Sabres	6	Chicago Black Hawks	2	
Quarter-finals	Game 5	22-Apr-75	Chicago Black Hawks	1	Buffalo Sabres	3	
Semi-finals	Game 1	27-Apr-75	Montreal Canadiens	5	Buffalo Sabres	6	(OT)
Semi-finals	Game 2	29-Apr-75	Montreal Canadiens	2	Buffalo Sabres	4	
Semi-finals	Game 3	1-May-75	Buffalo Sabres	0	Montreal Canadiens	7	
Semi-finals	Game 4	3-May-75	Buffalo Sabres	2	Montreal Canadiens	8	
Semi-finals	Game 5	6-May-75	Montreal Canadiens	4	Buffalo Sabres	5	(OT)
Semi-finals	Game 6	8-May-75	Buffalo Sabres	4	Montreal Canadiens	3	
Stanley Cup finals	Game 1	15-May-75	Buffalo Sabres	1	Philadelphia Flyers	4	
Stanley Cup finals	Game 2	18-May-75	Buffalo Sabres	1	Philadelphia Flyers	2	
Stanley Cup finals	Game 3	20-May-75	Philadelphia Flyers	4	Buffalo Sabres	5	(OT)
Stanley Cup finals	Game 4	22-May-75	Philadelphia Flyers	2	Buffalo Sabres	4	
Stanley Cup finals	Game 5	25-May-75	Buffalo Sabres	1	Philadelphia Flyers	5	
Stanley Cup finals	Game 6	27-May-75	Philadelphia Flyers	2	Buffalo Sabres	0	

=== Quarter-finals ===
The Sabres had a bye in the first round of the playoffs and then met the first round victor Chicago Black Hawks in the quarter-finals. In the first game of the series, the Sabres were the beneficiaries of an 18–2 penalty minutes differential and won 4–1. Although the Black Hawks scored in the first minute of game two, the Dudley scored a pair of goals on the way to a 3–1 Sabres victory. In game three, the Black Hawks took a one-goal lead four times and the Sabres tied the score each time, which led to sudden death overtime in which Chicago came out on top. The Sabres scored five times in the third period to post a 6–2 victory in game 4. The Sabres won the series 4–1, with Robert scoring the series clinching goal after getting into fisticuffs with Pit Martin and third man Phil Russell (who got ejected) earlier in the clinching game.

=== Semi-finals ===
The Sabres won the first game with an overtime goal by Gare. In game two, Robert was sidelined with the flu and Dudley was inactive due to a sprained knee, but the checking line of Luce, Ramsay and Gare each scored a goal as the Sabres took a 2–0 lead with a 4–2 victory. In the game, Henri Richard surpassed his brother Maurice Richard with his 127th Stanley Cup playoff point. Following their strong 7–0 game three performance, the Canadiens handily won game four at home by an 8–2 margin. The game was marked by a bench clearing incident when Doug Risebrough and Gare squared off. Bill Hajt got ejected as third man in and Larry Robinson who took on Hajt was also ejected. The Sabres surrendered an early 3–1 lead, but won in overtime of game five on Robert goal. The Sabres scored three goals in the first period of game six on their way to a series-clinching 4–3 victory. They led 3–1 after one period and added one in the second before withstanding a third period two-goal rally by Montreal.

=== Stanley Cup finals ===
The Flyers came into the series with their own good luck pre- game singer in the form of Kate Smith who sang "God Bless America" before home games at The Spectrum. The Flyers had a 43–3–1 record following her pregame performances in lieu of the traditional "Star Spangled Banner". In addition, the Sabres had never won a game against the Flyers in Philadelphia in their short five-year franchise history, had never beaten Flyer starting goalie Bernie Parent, and entered the series on a 13-game streak against the Flyers without a win.

Although the Sabres held the Flyers to two shots in the first period of game one, eight in the second, and were the beneficiaries of a 1:04 two-man advantage at one point, the game remained scoreless until the third period when the Flyers connected four times in a 4–1 victory. In game two, the Sabres were held to 19 shots on goal with none coming after Bobby Clarke scored at the 6:43 mark of the third period.

Due to unusual heat in Buffalo in May 1975, portions of game three, which is known as "The Fog Game", were played in heavy fog. The game was stopped 12 times due to the conditions. Buffalo goalie Desjardins gave up three first period goals, and Crozier started the second period. After having surrendered goals on his first two shots faced and three of his first six, Desjardins removed himself from the game. The Sabres recovered from the three-goal deficit on two goals 17 seconds apart by Gare and Martin. After a goal by Luce netted the score, Reggie Leach gave the Flyers the lead again. Bill Hajt scored his first career playoff goal to tie the score. Robert scored the game winner in overtime with a goal that Flyer goalie Bernie Parent did not see until it was too late. The game was the longest NHL overtime game in over four years. Players, officials, and the puck were invisible to many spectators. During a face-off and through the fog, Sabres center Jim Lorentz spotted a bat flying across the rink, raised his stick, and killed it. Many superstitious Buffalo fans considered this to be an "Evil Omen", pertaining to the result of the series. It was the only time that any player killed an animal during an NHL game. This was one of three playoff appearances for Crozier. Desjardins surrendered a goal on the third Flyer shot in game four, but he stayed in the game for a 4–2 victory. In game four, the unseasonable temperature only caused the play to be stopped twice (with 8:08 and 4:44 remaining) as five pairs of arena employees skated around the ice with bed sheets to clear the haze.

By game five of the finals Dave Schultz had claimed both the single-season regular season penalty minutes record and the post-season record. However, he contributed his first two goals of the playoffs in a 5–2 win to help the Flyers take a 3–2 lead in the series. It was Schultz' first two-goal performance of the season and his first goal since March 9. In the sixth game Conn Smythe Trophy MVP Bernie Parent shut out the Sabres 2–0 to clinch the series four games to two. Crozier held the Flyers scoreless for the first two periods of the final game.

== Awards and records ==
- Prince of Wales Trophy
- Bill Masterton Memorial Trophy: Don Luce
- Rick Martin, 1975 NHL All-Star Game, NHL All-Star team, Left wing (1st team)
- Rene Robert, 1975 NHL All-Star Game, NHL All-Star team, Right Wing (2nd team)
- Don Luce 1975 NHL All-Star Game
- Jerry Korab 1975 NHL All-Star Game
- Peter McNab NHL shooting percentage leader (24.4%)
- Club Record, Most Goals For, (354)
