= Henry Nowak (disambiguation) =

Henry Nowak (died 2025) was a murdered British student.

Henry Nowak may also refer to:

- Hank Nowak (born 1950), Canadian ice hockey player
- Henry J. Nowak (1935–2024), American politician
- Henry Nowak (musician), American musician, member of the band Britny Fox
