= Randy Osburn =

Canadian ice hockey player

- Born: November 26, 1952 (age 73) Collingwood, Ontario, Canada
- Height: 6 ft 0 in (183 cm)
- Weight: 190 lb (86 kg; 13 st 8 lb)
- Position: Left wing
- Shot: Left
- Played for: Toronto Maple Leafs; Philadelphia Flyers
- NHL draft: 27th overall, 1972; Toronto Maple Leafs
- Playing career: 1972–1978

Randoulf Allan Osburn (born November 26, 1952) is a Canadian former professional ice hockey left winger who played 27 National Hockey League (NHL) games with the Toronto Maple Leafs and Philadelphia Flyers between 1972 and 1974. He was traded along with Dave Fortier from the Maple Leafs to the Flyers for Bill Flett on May 27, 1974. The rest of his career, which lasted from 1972 to 1978, was spent in the minor leagues.

== Career statistics ==
=== Regular season and playoffs ===
			Regular season					Playoffs
Season	Team	League	GP	G	A	Pts	PIM	GP	G	A	Pts	PIM
1970–71	Hamilton Red Wings	OHA	12	1	4	5	7	—	—	—	—	—
1970–71	London Knights	OHA	42	18	29	47	8	4	1	1	2	0
1971–72	London Knights	OHA	63	43	57	100	29	7	3	8	11	2
1972–73	Toronto Maple Leafs	NHL	26	0	2	2	0	—	—	—	—	—
1972–73	Tulsa Oilers	CHL	27	9	11	20	25	—	—	—	—	—
1973–74	Oklahoma City Blazers	CHL	72	37	25	62	13	10	3	3	6	4
1974–75	Philadelphia Flyers	NHL	1	0	0	0	0	—	—	—	—	—
1974–75	Richmond Robins	AHL	13	1	3	4	0	—	—	—	—	—
1974–75	Philadelphia Firebirds	NAHL	26	12	11	23	10	4	1	1	2	5
1975–76	Philadelphia Firebirds	NAHL	69	29	39	68	46	16	11	8	19	10
1976–77	Philadelphia Firebirds	NAHL	40	32	26	58	10	—	—	—	—	—
1977–78	Philadelphia Firebirds	AHL	78	35	26	61	30	4	1	0	1	2
AHL totals			91	36	29	65	30	4	1	0	1	2
NAHL totals			135	73	76	149	66	20	12	9	21	15
NHL totals			27	0	2	2	0	—	—	—	—	—
