= Steve Short =

American ice hockey player (born 1954)

- Born: April 6, 1954 (age 72) Roseville, Minnesota, U.S.
- Height: 6 ft 2 in (188 cm)
- Weight: 210 lb (95 kg; 15 st 0 lb)
- Position: Left wing
- Shot: Left
- Played for: Los Angeles Kings; Detroit Red Wings
- National team: United States
- NHL draft: 142nd overall, 1974; Philadelphia Flyers
- WHA draft: 105th overall, 1974; Phoenix Roadrunners
- Playing career: 1974–1981

Steven Andrew Short (born April 6, 1954) is an American retired professional ice hockey player. He played six games in the National Hockey League with the Los Angeles Kings and Detroit Red Wings during the 1977–78 and 1978–79 seasons. The rest of his career, which lasted from 1974 to 1981, was spent in the minor leagues.

== Career statistics ==
=== Regular season and playoffs ===
			Regular season					Playoffs
Season	Team	League	GP	G	A	Pts	PIM	GP	G	A	Pts	PIM
1970–71	Alexander Ramsey High School	HS-MN	—	—	—	—	—	—	—	—	—	—
1971–72	Alexander Ramsey High School	HS-MN	—	—	—	—	—	—	—	—	—	—
1972–73	University of Wisconsin	B1G	2	0	0	0	4	—	—	—	—	—
1973–74	Minnesota Junior Stars	MidJHL	54	28	47	75	103	—	—	—	—	—
1974–75	Richmond Robins	AHL	43	5	11	16	106	5	0	0	0	12
1974–75	Philadelphia Firebirds	NAHL	12	6	1	7	25	—	—	—	—	—
1975–76	Richmond Robins	AHL	74	5	14	19	302	8	1	0	1	15
1976–77	Springfield Indians	AHL	24	0	3	3	72	—	—	—	—	—
1976–77	Fort Worth Texans	CHL	48	5	9	14	135	6	2	1	3	33
1977–78	Los Angeles Kings	NHL	5	0	0	0	2	—	—	—	—	—
1977–78	Springfield Indians	AHL	67	2	20	22	236	4	0	0	0	0
1978–79	Detroit Red Wings	NHL	1	0	0	0	0	—	—	—	—	—
1978–79	Kansas City Red Wings	CHL	51	3	11	14	216	4	0	2	2	26
1979–80	Adirondack Red Wings	AHL	66	1	8	9	167	3	0	0	0	6
1980–81	Adirondack Red Wings	AHL	63	2	7	9	75	16	0	1	1	20
1981–82	Kalamazoo Wings	IHL	1	0	0	0	2	—	—	—	—	—
AHL totals			337	15	63	78	958	36	1	1	2	53
NHL totals			6	0	0	0	2	—	—	—	—	—

=== International ===
Year	Team	Event	GP	G	A	Pts	PIM
1974	United States	WJC	5	1	2	3	14
Junior totals			5	1	2	3	14
