= Hank Nowak =

Canadian ice hockey player (born 1950)

- Born: November 24, 1950 (age 75) Oshawa, Ontario, Canada
- Height: 6 ft 0 in (183 cm)
- Weight: 190 lb (86 kg; 13 st 8 lb)
- Position: Left wing
- Shot: Left
- Played for: Pittsburgh Penguins; Detroit Red Wings; Boston Bruins
- NHL draft: 87th overall, 1970; Philadelphia Flyers
- Playing career: 1970–1980

Henry Stanley "Hank" Nowak (born November 24, 1950) is a Canadian former professional ice hockey player. He played 180 games in the National Hockey League with the Pittsburgh Penguins, Detroit Red Wings, and Boston Bruins between 1973 and 1977. The rest of his career, which lasted from 1970 to 1980, was spent in the minor leagues.

== Playing career ==
Hank Nowak played left-wing for three different teams throughout the 1970s. He was a disciplined checker, a useful grinder with a muscular build who could contribute occasionally to the scoring.

Nowak was born in Oshawa, the son of a Polish father and a Russian mother who came to Canada after the Second World War. "He inherited his father’s hands; they were oversized, strong, and made for hard work. Even now, when Nowak shakes hands, it’s the grip people notice." (excerpt from https://www.theglobeandmail.com/sports/hockey/article-hank-nowak-missing-wallet-nhl-hockey/)

Nowak spent two years with the Oshawa Generals of the OHA. Chosen 87th overall by the Flyers in the 1970 NHL Amateur Draft, he was assigned to the Quebec Aces. He also played with the Richmond Robins and Hershey Bears, and was then traded to the Pittsburgh Penguins.

After 13 games with the Pens in 1973-74, he spent most of the season in Hershey, scoring 32 goals in 56 games. In May 1974, Nowak was traded to Detroit for Nelson Debenedet. On Dec 5, 1974 - he was involved in an altercation on the ice with Carol Vadnais. A few weeks later he was traded to the bruins which led to the infamous 'racoon' meeting. You can find that on youtube.

Nowak scored 22 points in 56 games for the Wings, but then he was traded to Boston with Earl Anderson for Walt McKechnie.

In the 1975 NHL playoffs, Nowak scored one goal. In 1975-76, he played 10 games for Boston when they reached the Stanley Cup semifinals.

On February 7, 1976, Nowak played in Darryl Sittler's NHL record-setting game when Boston played the Toronto Maple Leafs. This was the night that Sittler set an NHL record for most points scored in one game when he recorded ten points (six goals, four assists). Nowak claims that despite the 11–4 loss that night he was still +3!

Nowak retired from competitive hockey in 1980. He went on to work for the Toronto Transit Commission, and is now fully retired.

Hank Nowak was playing occasionally in the ASHL for the 'Toronto Blue Hogs.' He played occasionally in tournaments, and the infamous Christmas levee with some Blue Hog alumni and his son Clinton. He still plays pickup every week with his son Clinton in an east end rink in downtown Toronto.

In 2023, a wallet belonging to Nowak that he lost in 1973 was returned by mail to the Globe and Mail newspaper in Toronto from a man in New Haven, CT. The newspaper has no way of contacting the man who found the wallet, but Nowak and the newspaper are hoping the man can contact the editor at the Globe and Mail the wallet was addressed to. You can find the globe article here: https://www.theglobeandmail.com/sports/hockey/article-hank-nowak-missing-wallet-nhl-hockey/

== Career statistics ==
=== Regular season and playoffs ===
			Regular season					Playoffs
Season	Team	League	GP	G	A	Pts	PIM	GP	G	A	Pts	PIM
1968–69	Oshawa Generals	OHA	26	2	3	5	37	—	—	—	—	—
1969–70	Oshawa Generals	OHA	53	17	22	39	37	6	1	2	3	6
1970–71	Quebec Aces	AHL	49	2	7	9	26	1	0	0	0	0
1971–72	Richmond Robins	AHL	62	2	3	5	8	—	—	—	—	—
1972–73	Hershey Bears	AHL	66	25	22	47	77	7	1	2	3	8
1973–74	Pittsburgh Penguins	NHL	13	0	0	0	11	—	—	—	—	—
1973–74	Hershey Bears	AHL	56	32	37	69	90	14	3	12	15	14
1974–75	Detroit Red Wings	NHL	56	8	14	22	69	—	—	—	—	—
1974–75	Boston Bruins	NHL	21	4	7	11	26	3	1	0	1	0
1975–76	Boston Bruins	NHL	66	7	3	10	41	10	0	0	0	8
1976–77	Boston Bruins	NHL	24	7	5	12	14	—	—	—	—	—
1976–77	Rochester Americans	AHL	35	12	17	29	26	—	—	—	—	—
1977–78	Binghamton Dusters	AHL	77	20	24	44	50	—	—	—	—	—
1978–79	Philadelphia Firebirds	AHL	32	7	12	19	16	—	—	—	—	—
1978–79	Cape Cod Freedoms	NEHL	1	0	0	0	0	—	—	—	—	—
1978–79	Utica Mohawks	NEHL	43	27	43	70	49	—	—	—	—	—
1979–80	Saginaw Gears	IHL	12	6	3	9	44	—	—	—	—	—
1979–80	Toledo Goaldiggers	IHL	65	14	22	36	59	4	0	0	0	2
AHL totals			377	100	122	222	293	21	4	14	18	22
NHL totals			180	26	29	55	161	13	1	0	1	8
