= 28th National Hockey League All-Star Game =

Professional ice hockey exhibition game

28th NHL All-Star Game
	1	2	3	Total
Campbell	1	0	0	1
Wales	3	1	3	7
- Date: January 21, 1975
- Arena: Montreal Forum
- City: Montreal
- MVP: Syl Apps Jr. (Pittsburgh)
- Attendance: 16,080

The 28th National Hockey League All-Star Game was held in the Montreal Forum in Montreal, home to the Montreal Canadiens, on January 21, 1975. The NHL expansion changed the format of the NHL All-Star game into a battle of conferences. The Wales Conference All-Star team easily won the initial contest, trouncing the Campbell Conference 7–1. Syl Apps Jr. was voted the game's most valuable player after scoring two goals. The game was also notable for the first female reporters allowed in a men's professional sports locker room, Robin Herman (The New York Times) and Marcelle St. Cyr (CKLM radio in Montreal).

== Team lineups ==
Syl Apps Jr. was the first son of an NHL All-Star to appear in an All-Star game. The era of exclusively Canadian NHL All-Star lineups finally ended as Curt Bennett (born in Canada but raised in Rhode Island and an American citizen) became only the third American hockey player to participate in an NHL All-Star game. From this point on, there has always been at least one non-Canadian NHL All-Star as the number of American and European NHL players have increased dramatically since the early 1970s.

=== Wales Conference All-Stars ===
- Coach: Bep Guidolin (Kansas City Scouts)

#	Nat.	Player	Pos.	Team
Goaltenders
1	(Canada)	Rogie Vachon		Los Angeles Kings
29	(Canada)	Ken Dryden		Montreal Canadiens
Defencemen
2	(Canada)	Terry Harper		Los Angeles Kings
3	(Canada)	Bob Murdoch		Los Angeles Kings
4	(Canada)	Bobby Orr		Boston Bruins
5	(Canada)	Guy Lapointe		Montreal Canadiens
6	(Canada)	Jerry Korab		Buffalo Sabres
10	(Canada)	Carol Vadnais		Boston Bruins
Forwards
7	(Canada)	Phil Esposito	C	Boston Bruins
8	(Canada)	Rick Martin	LW	Buffalo Sabres
12	(Canada)	Marcel Dionne	C	Detroit Red Wings
14	(Canada)	Rene Robert	RW	Buffalo Sabres
15	(Canada)	Denis Dupere	LW	Washington Capitals
16	(Canada)	Guy Lafleur	RW	Montreal Canadiens
19	(Canada)	Jean Pronovost	RW	Pittsburgh Penguins
20	(Canada)	Don Luce	C	Buffalo Sabres
22	(Canada)	Joey Johnston	LW	California Golden Seals
24	(Canada)	Terry O'Reilly	RW	Boston Bruins
26	(Canada)	Syl Apps Jr.	C	Pittsburgh Penguins
27	(Canada)	Darryl Sittler	C	Toronto Maple Leafs

=== Campbell Conference All-Stars ===
- Coach: Fred Shero (Philadelphia Flyers)

#	Nat.	Player	Pos.	Team
Goaltenders
1	(Canada)	Bernie Parent		Philadelphia Flyers
30	(Canada)	Gary Smith		Vancouver Canucks
Defencemen
2	(Canada)	Brad Park		New York Rangers
3	(Canada)	Ed Van Impe		Philadelphia Flyers
4	(Canada)	Doug Jarrett		Chicago Black Hawks
5	(Canada)	Denis Potvin		New York Islanders
19	(Canada)	Tracy Pratt		Vancouver Canucks
20	(Canada)	Jim Watson		Philadelphia Flyers
Forwards
6	(Canada)	Bill Barber	LW	Philadelphia Flyers
7	(Canada)	Garry Unger	C	St. Louis Blues
8	(Canada)	Jim Pappin	RW	Chicago Black Hawks
9	(Canada)	Steve Vickers	LW	New York Rangers
10	(Canada)	Rod Gilbert	RW	New York Rangers
11	(United States)	Curt Bennett	C	Atlanta Flames
12	(Canada)	Tom Lysiak	C	Atlanta Flames
16	(Canada)	Bobby Clarke	C	Philadelphia Flyers
17	(Canada)	Simon Nolet	RW	Kansas City Scouts
18	(Canada)	Ed Westfall	RW	New York Islanders
21	(Canada)	Stan Mikita	C	Chicago Black Hawks
22	(Canada)	Dennis Hextall	C	Minnesota North Stars

G = Goaltenders; D = Defencemen; C = Centre; LW/RW = Left Wing/Right Wing

== Game summary ==
#	Score	Team	Goalscorer (Assist(s))	Time
First period
1	1-0	Wales	Apps (Johnston - Vadnais)	9:38
2	2-0	Wales	Luce (O'Reilly - Dupere)	12:02
3	3-0	Wales	Sittler (Lafleur)	14:22
4	3-1	Campbell	Potvin (Unger)	19:41
Penalties : none
Second period
5	4-1	Wales	Esposito (Lafleur - Murdoch)	19:16
Penalties : Vickers (Cam.) 0:16; Luce (Wal.) 4:51; Harper (Wal.) 12:11; Korab (Wal.) 19:37
Third period
6	5-1	Wales	Apps (Robert - Martin)	3:25
7	6-1	Wales	O'Reilly	5:43
8	7-1	Wales	Orr (Lafleur - Sittler)	7:19
Penalties : watson (Cam.) 6:42; Clarke (Cam.) 13:32

Goaltenders :

- Wales : Vachon (30:39 minutes), Dryden (29:21 minutes).
- Campbell : Parent (29:17 minutes), Smith (30:43 minutes).

Shots on goal :

- Wales (37) 14 - 09 - 14
- Campbell (29) 10 - 09 - 10

Referee : Wally Harris

Linesmen : Leon Stickle, Claude Bechard

== See also ==
- 1974–75 NHL season
