= Kelly Pratt (ice hockey) =

Canadian ice hockey player

- Born: February 8, 1953 (age 73) High Prairie, Alberta, Canada
- Height: 5 ft 7 in (170 cm)
- Weight: 165 lb (75 kg; 11 st 11 lb)
- Position: Right wing
- Shot: Right
- Played for: Winnipeg Jets; Pittsburgh Penguins
- NHL draft: Undrafted
- WHA draft: 37th overall, 1973; Winnipeg Jets
- Playing career: 1973–1979

Kelly Edward Pratt (born February 8, 1953) is a Canadian former professional ice hockey winger who played 46 games in the World Hockey Association with the Winnipeg Jets during the 1973–74 season and 22 games in the National Hockey League with the Pittsburgh Penguins during the 1974–75 season. The rest of his career, which lasted from 1973 to 1979, was spent in the minor leagues.

== Career statistics ==
=== Regular season and playoffs ===
Additional information needed

			Regular season					Playoffs
Season	Team	League	GP	G	A	Pts	PIM	GP	G	A	Pts	PIM
1969–70	Red Deer Rustlers	AJHL	29	3	4	7	56	—	—	—	—	—
1970–71	Kamloops Rockets	BCJHL	—	—	—	—	—	—	—	—	—	—
1971–72	Swift Current Broncos	WCHL	63	36	29	65	114	—	—	—	—	—
1972–73	Swift Current Broncos	WCHL	65	45	37	82	91	—	—	—	—	—
1973–74	Winnipeg Jets	WHA	46	4	6	10	50	—	—	—	—	—
1973–74	Jacksonville Barons	AHL	16	2	6	8	24	—	—	—	—	—
1974–75	Pittsburgh Penguins	NHL	22	0	6	6	15	—	—	—	—	—
1974–75	Hershey Bears	AHL	31	7	10	17	97	8	0	2	2	14
1975–76	Hershey Bears	AHL	62	13	25	38	96	1	0	0	0	0
1976–77	Hershey Bears	AHL	31	2	5	7	21	—	—	—	—	—
1977–78	Hampton Gulls	AHL	11	1	0	1	26	—	—	—	—	—
1977–78	San Diego Mariners	PHL	23	10	15	25	20	—	—	—	—	—
1978–79	Spokane Flyers	PHL	18	5	5	10	32	—	—	—	—	—
1978–79	Los Angeles Blades	PHL	9	6	2	8	9	—	—	—	—	—
1978–79	San Diego Hawks	PHL	16	3	4	7	4	—	—	—	—	—
WHA totals			46	4	6	10	50	—	—	—	—	—
NHL totals			22	0	6	6	15	—	—	—	—	—
