= Syl Apps Jr. =

Canadian ice hockey player (born 1947)

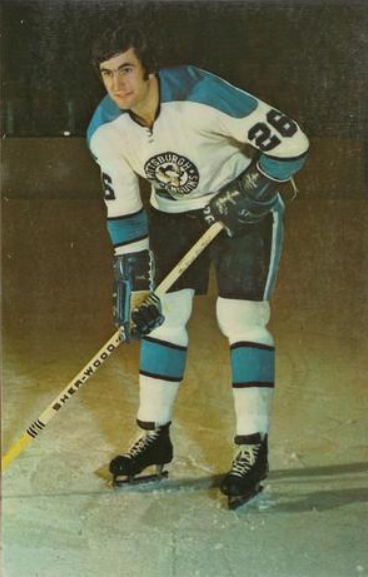
- Apps Jr. in 1971 photo
- Born: August 1, 1947 (age 79) Toronto, Ontario, Canada
- Height: 6 ft 0 in (183 cm)
- Weight: 185 lb (84 kg; 13 st 3 lb)
- Position: Centre
- Shot: Right
- Played for: NHL; Pittsburgh Penguins; Los Angeles Kings; New York Rangers; AHL; Buffalo Bisons; CHL; Omaha Knights; OHASr; Kingston Aces
- NHL draft: 21st overall, 1964; New York Rangers
- Playing career: 1968–1980

Sylvanus Marshall Apps (born August 1, 1947) is a Canadian former professional ice hockey centre who played 10 seasons in the National Hockey League for the New York Rangers, Los Angeles Kings and Pittsburgh Penguins. Apps was born in Toronto, Ontario. He is the son of Hockey Hall of Fame member Syl Apps.

== Playing career ==
Apps played in the inaugural 1960 Quebec International Pee-Wee Hockey Tournament with the Scarboro Lions. He was originally drafted by the New York Rangers in 1964 but did not play his first big league season until 1970. That season, he was traded to the Pittsburgh Penguins, the team with which he made his mark, becoming one of the franchise's first stars. Between 1973 and 1976, Apps centered the Century Line with left wing Lowell MacDonald and right wing Jean Pronovost. He led the team in scoring three times and was named to play in the 1975 All-Star Game. Apps set a team record with 59 points in 1971–72, broke his own record in 1972–73 with 85 points, and tied that in 1973–74. Apps's best season was 1975–76, when he scored 32 goals and 67 assists for 99 points, although this was not a team record, as during this season Pierre Larouche scored 111 points and Jean Pronovost tallied 104.

With Apps's numbers declining, he was traded to the Los Angeles Kings in the 1977–78 season as the Penguins started to remake the team (Pierre Larouche, Dennis Owchar and Hartland Monahan were all dealt during this season. Dave Burrows and Jean Pronovost would be as well at the season's conclusion.) Apps retired two years later, finishing his career as the Penguins' career assist leader and second in goals and points. He played 727 career NHL games, scoring 183 goals and 423 assists for 606 points.

== Personal ==
Syl Apps Jr.'s son, Syl Apps III, was a hockey player in his own right, starring at Princeton University before spending four years in the minor leagues, retiring in 2003. His daughter, Gillian Apps, graduated from Dartmouth College in Hanover, New Hampshire, and majored in psychology. She played for the Dartmouth Big Green women's ice hockey program and was a top 10 finalist for the 2007 Patty Kazmaier Award. In addition, she was a two-time member of the Canadian Olympic team, and won gold medals in ice hockey at the 2006 Winter Olympics and ice hockey at the 2010 Winter Olympics. His oldest daughter, Amy Apps, was a member of the Canadian national women’s soccer team and an OUA All Star in 1998 and 1999. His nephew, Darren Barber, won a gold medal in the men's eight at the 1992 Summer Olympics in Barcelona, as a member of the Canadian rowing team. Barber also competed at the 1996 Summer Olympics in Atlanta, where he finished 4th.

== Career statistics ==
=== Regular season and playoffs ===
			Regular season					Playoffs
Season	Team	League	GP	G	A	Pts	PIM	GP	G	A	Pts	PIM
1965–66	Kingston Frontenacs	EJHL	—	—	—	—	—	—	—	—	—	—
1966–67	Princeton University	ECAC	—	—	—	—	—	—	—	—	—	—
1967–68	Kingston Aces	OHA-Sr.	35	16	22	38	28	—	—	—	—	—
1968–69	Kingston Aces	OHA-Sr.	27	14	22	36	17	—	—	—	—	—
1968–69	Buffalo Bisons	AHL	2	1	2	3	4	—	—	—	—	—
1969–70	Omaha Knights	CHL	68	16	38	54	43	12	10	9	19	4
1969–70	Buffalo Bisons	AHL	—	—	—	—	—	7	2	3	5	6
1970–71	Omaha Knights	CHL	11	0	5	5	4	—	—	—	—	—
1970–71	New York Rangers	NHL	31	1	2	3	11	—	—	—	—	—
1970–71	Pittsburgh Penguins	NHL	31	9	16	25	21	—	—	—	—	—
1971–72	Pittsburgh Penguins	NHL	72	15	44	59	78	4	1	0	1	2
1972–73	Pittsburgh Penguins	NHL	77	29	56	85	18	—	—	—	—	—
1973–74	Pittsburgh Penguins	NHL	75	24	61	85	37	—	—	—	—	—
1974–75	Pittsburgh Penguins	NHL	79	24	55	79	43	9	2	3	5	9
1975–76	Pittsburgh Penguins	NHL	80	32	67	99	24	3	0	1	1	0
1976–77	Pittsburgh Penguins	NHL	72	18	43	61	20	3	1	0	1	12
1977–78	Pittsburgh Penguins	NHL	9	0	7	7	0	—	—	—	—	—
1977–78	Los Angeles Kings	NHL	70	19	26	45	0	—	—	—	—	—
1978–79	Los Angeles Kings	NHL	80	7	30	37	29	2	1	0	1	0
1979–80	Los Angeles Kings	NHL	51	5	16	21	12	—	—	—	—	—
NHL totals			727	183	423	606	311	23	5	5	10	23

== Transactions ==
- On June 11, 1964 the New York Rangers selected Syl Apps Jr. in the fourth-round (#21 overall) of the 1964 NHL draft.
- On January 26, 1971 the New York Rangers traded Syl Apps Jr. and Sheldon Kannegiesser to the Pittsburgh Penguins in exchange for Glen Sather.
- On November 2, 1977 the Pittsburgh Penguins traded Syl Apps Jr. and Hartland Monahan to the Los Angeles Kings in exchange for Dave Schultz, Gene Carr and a 1978 fourth-round pick (#61-Shane Pearsall).

== See also ==
- Notable families in the NHL
