= Dave Fortier =

Canadian ice hockey player

- Born: June 17, 1951 (age 75) Sudbury, Ontario, Canada
- Height: 5 ft 11 in (180 cm)
- Weight: 190 lb (86 kg; 13 st 8 lb)
- Position: Defence
- Shot: Left
- Played for: Toronto Maple Leafs; New York Islanders; Vancouver Canucks; Indianapolis Racers (WHA)
- NHL draft: 23rd overall, 1971; Toronto Maple Leafs
- Playing career: 1971–1979

David Edward Fortier (born June 17, 1951) is a Canadian former professional ice hockey player who played in the National Hockey League and the World Hockey Association during the 1970s. Selected by the Toronto Maple Leafs in the 1971 NHL Amateur Draft, Fortier spent most of the next three seasons in the minor Central Hockey League, though he played one season with Toronto before joining the New York Islanders for two seasons, with his final NHL season with the Vancouver Canucks. He then moved to the Indianapolis Racers of the World Hockey Association, and spent a final season in the minor leagues before retiring in 1979.

== Playing career ==
A hard-nosed, physical defender, Fortier was selected 23rd overall by the Toronto Maple Leafs in the 1971 NHL Amateur Draft. He spent most of the next three seasons in the Central Hockey League, earning a 23-game callup to the Maple Leafs in 1972–73 during which he scored his first NHL goal and added 4 assists.

Fortier was traded along with Randy Osburn from the Maple Leafs to the Philadelphia Flyers for Bill Flett on May 27, 1974. He was claimed by the New York Islanders in the intra-league draft a few weeks later. He emerged as a regular for the Islanders in 1974–75, recording 6 goals and 18 points in 65 games, as well as a solid +14 rating. In the playoffs, he was a member of the Islander team which memorably came back from a 3–0 series deficit to defeat the Pittsburgh Penguins and reach the Stanley Cup semi-finals.

In 1975–76, Fortier saw his icetime significantly reduced, and he recorded just 2 assists in 59 games for the Islanders. Prior to the 1976–77 campaign, he was sold to the Vancouver Canucks. He spent one season in Vancouver as a solid depth defender, recording 4 points and 125 penalty minutes in 58 games.

For the 1977–78 season, Fortier jumped to the World Hockey Association to sign with the Indianapolis Racers. With the Racers, he recorded 1 goal and 15 assists for 16 points in 54 games. However, he found himself in the minors the following season, and retired from the sport in 1979.

During his career, Fortier appeared in 205 NHL games, scoring 8 goals and 21 assists for 29 points along with 335 penalty minutes. He also appeared in 20 playoff games, recording 2 assists and 33 penalty minutes.

== Career statistics ==
=== Regular season and playoffs ===
			Regular season					Playoffs
Season	Team	League	GP	G	A	Pts	PIM	GP	G	A	Pts	PIM
1968–69	Garson Falconbridge Native Sons	NOJHL	35	2	10	12	56	6	0	1	1	16
1969–70	Chelmsford Canadiens	NOJHL	43	8	20	28	232	—	—	—	—	—
1970–71	St. Catharines Black Hawks	OHA	60	8	16	24	196	15	0	6	6	74
1971–72	Tulsa Oilers	CHL	71	7	20	27	217	13	0	8	8	39
1971–73	Toronto Maple Leafs	NHL	23	1	4	5	63	—	—	—	—	—
1972–73	Tulsa Oilers	CHL	50	2	20	22	148	—	—	—	—	—
1973–74	Oklahoma City Blazers	CHL	72	10	38	48	200	10	0	1	1	35
1974–75	New York Islanders	NHL	65	6	12	18	79	14	0	2	2	33
1975–76	New York Islanders	NHL	59	0	2	2	68	6	0	0	0	0
1976–77	Vancouver Canucks	NHL	58	1	3	4	125	—	—	—	—	—
1977–78	Indianapolis Racers	WHA	54	1	15	16	86	—	—	—	—	—
1978–79	Erie Blades	NEHL	44	1	22	23	145	—	—	—	—	—
WHA totals			54	1	15	16	86	—	—	—	—	—
NHL totals			205	8	21	29	335	20	0	2	2	33
