= Nelson Debenedet =

Italian-Canadian ice hockey player

- Born: December 31, 1947 (age 78) Cordenons, Italy
- Height: 6 ft 1 in (185 cm)
- Weight: 195 lb (88 kg; 13 st 13 lb)
- Position: Left wing
- Shot: Left
- Played for: Detroit Red Wings; Pittsburgh Penguins
- NHL draft: Undrafted
- Playing career: 1971–1976

Nelson Flavio Debenedet (born December 31, 1947) is an Italian-born Canadian retired ice hockey forward from Cordenons, Italy, and grew up in Copper Cliff, Ontario, Canada. He was the first Italian-born player in the NHL.

Debenedet began his National Hockey League career with the Detroit Red Wings, playing his last season at top level with the Pittsburgh Penguins.

== Career statistics ==
			Regular Season					Playoffs
Season	Team	League	GP	G	A	Pts	PIM	GP	G	A	Pts	PIM
1966–67	Michigan State University	WCHA	27	0	7	7	14	—	—	—	—	—
1967–68	Michigan State University	WCHA	29	4	3	7	25	—	—	—	—	—
1968–69	Michigan State University	WCHA	28	10	7	17	40	—	—	—	—	—
1969–70	Fort Wayne Komets	IHL	8	0	3	3	6	—	—	—	—	—
1970–71	University of Toronto	CIAU	—	3	9	12	0	—	—	—	—	—
1971–72	Tidewater Wings	AHL	22	4	3	7	12	—	—	—	—	—
1971–72	Fort Worth Wings	CHL	14	2	4	6	15	—	—	—	—	—
1971–72	Port Huron Wings	IHL	30	7	5	12	19	—	—	—	—	—
1972–73	Virginia Red Wings	AHL	76	29	27	56	64	13	2	5	7	6
1973–74	Virginia Red Wings	AHL	39	8	15	23	40	—	—	—	—	—
1973–74	Detroit Red Wings	NHL	15	4	1	5	2	—	—	—	—	—
1974–75	Hershey Bears	AHL	25	6	6	12	13	12	2	4	6	2
1974–75	Pittsburgh Penguins	NHL	31	6	3	9	11	—	—	—	—	—
1975–76	Hershey Bears	AHL	69	14	19	33	12	9	4	5	9	6
NHL totals			46	10	4	14	13	—	—	—	—	—
