= 1972–73 Pittsburgh Penguins season =

NHL team season

1972–73 Pittsburgh Penguins
- Division: 5th West
- 1972–73 record: 32–37–9
- Home record: 24–11–4
- Road record: 8–26–5
- Goals for: 257
- Goals against: 260

Team information
- General manager: Jack Riley
- Coach: Red Kelly (replaced 13/1/73 by Ken Schinkel)
- Captain: Vacant
- Alternate captains: Syl Apps; Bryan Hextall; Ken Schinkel
- Arena: Pittsburgh Civic Arena

Team leaders
- Goals: Al McDonough (35)
- Assists: Syl Apps (56)
- Points: Syl Apps (85)
- Penalty minutes: Bryan Watson (179)
- Wins: Jim Rutherford (20)
- Goals against average: Jim Rutherford (2.91)

The 1972–73 Pittsburgh Penguins season was the franchise's sixth season in the National Hockey League (NHL). The Penguins failed to make the 1973 playoffs for the first time since the 1970–71 season.

== Regular season ==
=== Final standings ===
West Division
		GP	W	L	T	GF	GA	DIFF	Pts
1	Chicago Black Hawks	78	42	27	9	284	225	+59	93
2	Philadelphia Flyers	78	37	30	11	296	256	+40	85
3	Minnesota North Stars	78	37	30	11	254	230	+24	85
4	St. Louis Blues	78	32	34	12	233	251	−18	76
5	Pittsburgh Penguins	78	32	37	9	257	265	−8	73
6	Los Angeles Kings	78	31	36	11	232	245	−13	73
7	Atlanta Flames	78	25	38	15	191	239	−48	65
8	California Golden Seals	78	16	46	16	213	323	−110	48

=== Record vs. opponents ===
==== Vs. West Division ====
1972–73 NHL records
Team	ATL	CAL	CHI	LAK	MIN	PHI	PIT	STL	Total
Atlanta	—	3–1–1	2–4	1–1–3	3–3	1–3–1	1–4	0–3–3	11–19–8
California	1–3–1	—	0–3–2	2–4	1–4	1–3–2	2–2–2	1–3–1	8–22–8
Chicago	4–2	3–0–2	—	2–3	3–2–1	2–2–1	2–3	3–3	19–15–4
Los Angeles	1–1–3	4–2	3–2	—	0–3–2	4–2	2–4	3–2	17–16–5
Minnesota	3–3	4–1	2–3–1	3–0–2	—	2–3	3–2	2–2–2	19–14–5
Philadelphia	3–1–1	3–1–2	2–2–1	2–4	3–2	—	4–2	3–1–1	20–13–5
Pittsburgh	4–1	2–2–2	3–2	4–2	2–3	2–4	—	3–2	20–16–2
St. Louis	3–0–3	3–1–1	3–3	2–3	2–2–2	1–3–1	2–3	—	16–15–7

==== Vs. East Division ====
1972–73 NHL records
Team	BOS	BUF	DET	MTL	NYI	NYR	TOR	VAN	Total
Atlanta	0–5	1–2–2	2–3	0–3–2	4–0–1	1–4	2–1–2	4–1	14–19–7
California	0–4–1	2–1–2	2–2–1	0–3–2	1–4	1–3–1	1–3–1	1–4	8–24–8
Chicago	3–2	3–2	3–2	3–2	4–0–1	2–2–1	2–1–2	3–1–1	23–12–5
Los Angeles	2–3	1–2–2	2–2–1	0–4–1	4–1	0–3–2	2–3	3–2	14–20–6
Minnesota	1–3–1	2–3	3–1–1	1–3–1	4–1	2–3	2–2–1	3–0–2	18–16–6
Philadelphia	0–4–1	3–2	1–3–1	2–2–1	4–1	0–4–1	3–1–1	4–0–1	17–17–6
Pittsburgh	1–4	0–3–2	0–2–3	0–5	4–0–1	2–3	2–2–1	3–2	12–21–7
St. Louis	3–2	1–2–2	3–2	0–3–2	3–1–1	0–5	2–3	4–1	16–19–5

== Schedule and results ==
1972–73 regular season
October: 5–5–0 (home: 2–1–0; road: 3–4–0)

#	Date	Visitor	Score	Home	Decision	Attendance	Record	Points
1	October 7	Los Angeles	2–4	Pittsburgh		11,105	1–0–0	2
2	October 11	Pittsburgh	5–2	St. Louis		17,853	2–0–0	4
3	October 14	California	2–5	Pittsburgh		12,201	3–0–0	6
4	October 15	Pittsburgh	4–8	Boston		15,003	3–1–0	6
5	October 17	Pittsburgh	5–0	NY Islanders		8,175	4–1–0	8
6	October 18	Pittsburgh	3–4	Toronto		16,248	4–2–0	8
7	October 21	Boston	4–2	Pittsburgh		12,761	4–3–0	8
8	October 24	Pittsburgh	4–0	Vancouver		15,570	5–3–0	10
9	October 27	Pittsburgh	3–6	California		3,298	5–4–0	10
10	October 28	Pittsburgh	2–5	Los Angeles		9,181	5–5–0	10

November: 7–5–2 (home: 6–2–1; road: 1–3–1)

#	Date	Visitor	Score	Home	Decision	Attendance	Record	Points
11	November 1	Montreal	7–1	Pittsburgh		10,472	5–6–0	10
12	November 2	Pittsburgh	2–4	Philadelphia		13,511	5–7–0	10
13	November 4	NY Rangers	4–6	Pittsburgh		12,255	6–7–0	12
14	November 5	Pittsburgh	1–1	Detroit		14,041	6–7–1	13
15	November 8	Philadelphia	2–5	Pittsburgh		7,449	7–7–1	15
16	November 11	Vancouver	4–3	Pittsburgh		11,896	7–8–1	15
17	November 12	Pittsburgh	0–1	Buffalo		15,668	7–9–1	15
18	November 15	Minnesota	1–7	Pittsburgh		8,649	8–9–1	17
19	November 18	Atlanta	1–6	Pittsburgh		10,959	9–9–1	19
20	November 19	Pittsburgh	5–3	NY Rangers		17,500	10–9–1	21
21	November 22	St. Louis	4–10	Pittsburgh		12,405	11–9–1	23
22	November 25	NY Islanders	2–2	Pittsburgh		12,319	11–9–2	24
23	November 26	Pittsburgh	2–6	Atlanta		9,041	11–10–2	24
24	November 29	Toronto	4–7	Pittsburgh		9,971	12–10–2	26

December: 3–6–4 (home: 3–2–1; road: 0–4–3)

#	Date	Visitor	Score	Home	Decision	Attendance	Record	Points
25	December 2	Chicago	2–3	Pittsburgh		12,459	13–10–2	28
26	December 3	Pittsburgh	2–4	Chicago			13–11–2	28
27	December 6	Pittsburgh	4–4	California		2,062	13–11–3	29
28	December 9	Pittsburgh	1–3	Los Angeles		9,687	13–12–3	29
29	December 13	NY Islanders	1–9	Pittsburgh		7,866	14–12–3	31
30	December 16	Atlanta	3–5	Pittsburgh		11,095	15–12–3	33
31	December 17	Pittsburgh	1–9	NY Rangers		17,500	15–13–3	33
32	December 19	Boston	3–2	Pittsburgh		10,419	15–14–3	33
33	December 23	Pittsburgh	3–6	Montreal		16,132	15–15–3	33
34	December 26	Pittsburgh	1–1	Detroit		14,427	15–15–4	34
35	December 27	Pittsburgh	3–3	Toronto		16,488	15–15–5	35
36	December 29	Toronto	4–0	Pittsburgh		11,336	15–16–5	35
37	December 30	Detroit	2–2	Pittsburgh		11,621	15–16–6	36

January: 6–9–0 (home: 5–3–0; road: 1–6–0)

#	Date	Visitor	Score	Home	Decision	Attendance	Record	Points
38	January 2	Pittsburgh	4–5	St. Louis		18,161	15–17–6	36
39	January 3	Pittsburgh	5–3	Chicago			16–17–6	38
40	January 6	Vancouver	2–4	Pittsburgh		13,100	17–17–6	40
41	January 7	Pittsburgh	0–3	NY Rangers		17,500	17–18–6	40
42	January 10	Detroit	2–1	Pittsburgh		9,906	17–19–6	40
43	January 13	Los Angeles	1–3	Pittsburgh		11,506	18–19–6	42
44	January 14	Pittsburgh	2–3	Detroit		12,755	18–20–6	42
45	January 17	Pittsburgh	4–6	Montreal		16,016	18–21–6	42
46	January 18	Montreal	5–2	Pittsburgh		10,388	18–22–6	42
47	January 20	Boston	0–3	Pittsburgh		13,100	19–22–6	44
48	January 21	Pittsburgh	3–9	Chicago			19–23–6	44
49	January 24	Toronto	2–5	Pittsburgh		10,809	20–23–6	46
50	January 25	Pittsburgh	3–6	Philadelphia		16,600	20–24–6	46
51	January 27	Philadelphia	5–3	Pittsburgh		13,100	20–25–6	46
52	January 31	Los Angeles	1–4	Pittsburgh		9,048	21–25–6	48

February: 6–5–1 (home: 5–0–1; road: 1–5–0)

#	Date	Visitor	Score	Home	Decision	Attendance	Record	Points
53	February 3	Minnesota	1–2	Pittsburgh		11,878	22–25–6	50
54	February 4	Pittsburgh	3–4	Minnesota		15,070	22–26–6	50
55	February 7	Pittsburgh	2–5	Montreal		16,028	22–27–6	50
56	February 10	Pittsburgh	3–6	Boston		15,003	22–28–6	50
57	February 14	Vancouver	2–6	Pittsburgh		8,758	23–28–6	52
58	February 17	Buffalo	3–3	Pittsburgh		13,100	23–28–7	53
59	February 18	Pittsburgh	1–4	Buffalo		15,660	23–29–7	53
60	February 20	Pittsburgh	4–0	NY Islanders		13,327	24–29–7	55
61	February 22	NY Islanders	1–2	Pittsburgh		9,200	25–29–7	57
62	February 24	Chicago	0–2	Pittsburgh		13,100	26–29–7	59
63	February 25	Pittsburgh	1–2	Buffalo		15,668	26–30–7	59
64	February 28	St. Louis	2–4	Pittsburgh		13,100	27–30–7	61

March: 4–7–2 (home: 2–3–1; road: 2–4–1)

#	Date	Visitor	Score	Home	Decision	Attendance	Record	Points
65	March 3	California	2–1	Pittsburgh		11,688	27–31–7	61
66	March 4	Minnesota	5–2	Pittsburgh		12,624	27–32–7	61
67	March 7	Pittsburgh	4–10	Minnesota		15,273	27–33–7	61
68	March 10	NY Rangers	5–4	Pittsburgh		13,100	27–34–7	61
69	March 11	Pittsburgh	2–3	Philadelphia		16,600	27–35–7	61
70	March 14	Pittsburgh	3–2	Los Angeles		8,007	28–35–7	63
71	March 16	Pittsburgh	5–5	California		5,180	28–35–8	64
72	March 17	Pittsburgh	1–6	Vancouver		15,570	28–36–8	64
73	March 21	California	2–5	Pittsburgh		8,169	29–36–8	66
74	March 24	Buffalo	4–4	Pittsburgh		12,945	29–36–9	67
75	March 25	Pittsburgh	4–2	Atlanta		13,200	30–36–9	69
76	March 28	Atlanta	3–6	Pittsburgh		10,081	31–36–9	71
77	March 31	Pittsburgh	2–7	St. Louis		20,009	31–37–9	71

April: 1–0–0 (home: 1–0–0; road: 0–0–0)

#	Date	Visitor	Score	Home	Decision	Attendance	Record	Points
78	April 1	Philadelphia	4–5	Pittsburgh		11,253	32–37–9	73

Legend: Win (2 points) Loss (0 points) Tie (1 point)

== Player statistics ==
Skaters

Regular season
Player	GP	G	A	Pts	+/−	PIM
Syl Apps Jr.	77	29	56	85	25	18
Al McDonough	78	35	41	76	20	26
Lowell MacDonald	78	34	41	75	37	8
Bryan Hextall Jr.	78	21	33	54	–23	113
Ron Schock	78	13	36	49	–12	23
Greg Polis	78	26	23	49	–32	36
Eddie Shack	74	25	20	45	–10	84
Jean Pronovost	66	21	22	43	–15	16
Darryl Edestrand	78	15	24	39	3	88
Dave Burrows	78	3	24	27	–4	42
Nick Harbaruk	78	10	15	25	–11	47
Ken Schinkel	42	11	10	21	–10	16
Duane Rupp	78	7	13	20	–3	62
Jack Lynch	47	1	18	19	–21	40
Bryan Watson	69	1	17	18	18	179
Rick Kessell	67	1	13	14	–9	0
Jean-Guy Lagace	31	1	5	6	–8	32
Steve Cardwell	20	2	2	4	–2	2
Jim Shires	18	1	2	3	–8	2
Robin Burns	26	0	2	2	–6	20
Jim Wiley	4	0	1	1	1	0
Sheldon Kannegiesser^{‡}	3	0	0	0	–1	0
Ron Lalonde	9	0	0	0	0	2
Total		257	418	675	—	856

Goaltenders

Regular Season
Player	GP	W	L	T	GA	SO
James Rutherford	49	20	22	5	129	3
Denis Herron	18	6	7	2	55	2
Andy Brown^{†}	9	3	4	2	41	0
Cam Newton	11	3	4	0	35	0
Total		32	37	9	260	5

^{†}Denotes player spent time with another team before joining the Penguins. Stats reflect time with the Penguins only.
^{‡}Denotes player was traded mid-season. Stats reflect time with the Penguins only.

== Awards and records ==
- Jean Pronovost became the first player to score 100 goals for the Penguins. He did so in a 3–3 tie against Buffalo on February 17.
- Syl Apps Jr. became the first player to record 50 assists in a season for the Penguins. He did so in a 5–2 win over California on March 21.
- Syl Apps Jr. established a new franchise record for points in a season with 85, besting the previous high of 59 held by both himself and Andy Bathgate.
- Ken Schinkel established a career franchise record for games (371), assists (143) and points (236). He had led in two categories since 1969 and bested the previous high in games set by Val Fonteyne in 1972 (349).
- Darryl Edestrand established a new franchise record for goals (15) and points (39) in a season by a defenseman. He topped the previous high of 10 goals (held by himself) and 33 points (held by Noel Price, Bob Woytowich, Duane Rupp and himself).
- Lowell MacDonald established a new franchise record for highest plus-minus in a season (+36). He broke the previous high of +18 set by Syl Apps Jr. in 1972.
- Duane Rupp became the first Penguins defenseman to score 100 points. His final total of 104 bested the previous total of 93 held by Bob Woytowich

== Transactions ==
The Penguins were involved in the following transactions during the 1972–73 season:

=== Trades ===
October 6, 1972	To Detroit Red Wings Roy Edwards	To Pittsburgh Penguins cash 1973 3rd round pick (Nelson Pyatt); 1974 2nd round pick (Bob Hess)
October 30, 1972	To Atlanta Flames Brian McKenzie	To Pittsburgh Penguins cash
January 8, 1973	To St. Louis Blues Joe Noris	To Pittsburgh Penguins Jim Shires
February 25, 1973	To Detroit Red Wings 1973 3rd round pick cash (Nelson Pyatt)	To Pittsburgh Penguins Andy Brown
March 2, 1973	To New York Rangers Sheldon Kannegiesser	To Pittsburgh Penguins player to be named (Steve Andrascik)

=== Additions and subtractions ===
Additions
Player	Former team	Via
Jim Wiley	Lake Superior State Lakers	free agency (1972–06–25)

Subtractions
Player	New team	Via
Les Binkley	Ottawa Nationals (WHA)	free agency (1972)
Wally Boyer	Winnipeg Jets (WHA)	free agency (1972)
Val Fonteyne	Alberta Oilers (WHA)	free agency (1972)
Dunc McCallum	Houston Aeros (WHA)	free agency (1972)
Tim Horton	Buffalo Sabres	Intra-league draft (1972–06–05)
Bob Leiter	Atlanta Flames	Expansion draft (1972–06–06)
Keith McCreary	Atlanta Flames	Expansion draft (1972–06–06)
John Stewart	Atlanta Flames	Expansion draft (1972–06–06)

== Draft picks ==
Pittsburgh Penguins' picks at the 1972 NHL entry draft.

Round	#	Player	Pos	Nationality	College/Junior/Club team (League)
2	24^{[a]}	Jack Lynch	Defense	Canada	Oshawa Generals (OHA)
2	30	Bernie Lukowich	Right wing	Canada	New Westminster Bruins (WCHL)
3	40	Denis Herron	Goaltender	Canada	Trois-Rivières Ducs (QMJHL)
4	56	Ron Lalonde	Center	Canada	Peterborough Petes (OHA)
5	72	Brian Walker	Center	Canada	Calgary Centennials (WCHL)
6	88	Jeff Ablett	Left wing	Canada	Medicine Hat Tigers (WCHL)
7	104	D'Arcy Keating	Defense	Canada	Notre Dame (NCAA)
8	120	Yves Bergeron	Right wing	Canada	Shawinigan Bruins (QMJHL)
9	136	Jay Babcock	Left wing	Canada	London Knights (OHA)
10	149	Don Atchison	Goaltender	Canada	Saskatoon Blades (WCHL)

Draft notes

- The Pittsburgh Penguins' first-round pick went to the Minnesota North Stars as the result of a June 10, 1968, trade that sent Bob Woytowich to the Penguins in exchange for this pick.
- ^{a} The St. Louis Blues' second-round pick (originally from the Montreal Canadiens) went to the Pittsburgh Penguins as a result of a June 6, 1969, trade that sent Lou Angotti and a 1971 first-round pick to the Blues in exchange for Ron Schock, Craig Cameron and this pick.
