= List of Minnesota North Stars draft picks =

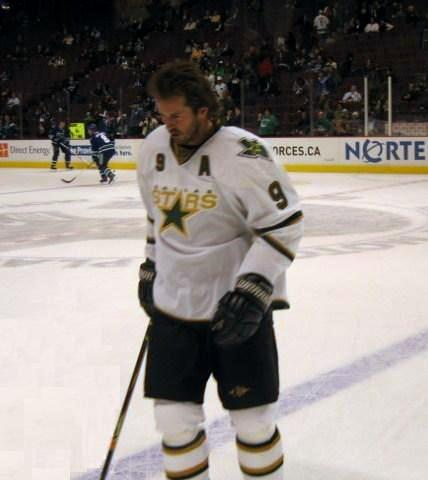
The North Stars selected Mike Modano 1st overall in the 1988 NHL entry draft.

This is a complete list of ice hockey players who were drafted in the National Hockey League Entry Draft by the Minnesota North Stars franchise. It includes every player the franchise drafted prior to their move to Dallas, from 1967 to 1992, regardless of whether they played for the team.

== Key ==
# Played at least one game with the North Stars
↑ Spent entire NHL career with the North Stars
(†) Inducted into the Hockey Hall of Fame

General terms and abbreviations
Term or abbreviation	Definition
Draft	The year that the player was selected
Round	The round of the draft in which the player was selected
Pick	The overall position in the draft at which the player was selected
S	Supplemental draft selection

Position abbreviations
Abbreviation	Definition
G	Goaltender
D	Defense
LW	Left wing
C	Center
RW	Right wing
F	Forward

Abbreviations for statistical columns
Abbreviation	Definition
Pos	Position
GP	Games played
G	Goals
A	Assists
Pts	Points
PIM	Penalties in minutes
W	Wins
L	Losses
T	Ties
GAA	Goals against average
—	Does not apply

== Draft picks ==
Draft	Round	Pick	Player	Nationality	Pos	GP	G	A	Pts	PIM	W	L	T	GAA
1967	1	4	Wayne Cheesman	Canada	LW	—	—	—	—	—	—	—	—	—
1967	2	13	Larry Mick	Canada	RW	—	—	—	—	—	—	—	—	—
1968	1	5	Jim Benzelock	Canada	RW	—	—	—	—	—	—	—	—	—
1968	2	15	Marc Rioux	Canada	C	—	—	—	—	—	—	—	—	—
1968	3	22	Glen Lindsay	Canada	G	—	—	—	—	—	—	—	—	—
1969	1	5	Dick Redmond#	Canada	D	771	133	312	445	504	—	—	—	—
1969	2	14	Dennis O'Brien#	Canada	D	592	31	91	122	1017	—	—	—	—
1969	3	25	Gilles Gilbert#	Canada	G	416	0	9	9	110	192	143	60	3.27
1969	4	37	Fred O'Donnell	Canada	RW	115	15	11	26	98	—	—	—	—
1969	5	49	Pierre Jutras	Canada	LW	—	—	—	—	—	—	—	—	—
1969	6	61	Rob Walton	Canada	C	—	—	—	—	—	—	—	—	—
1969	7	72	Rick Thompson	Canada	D	—	—	—	—	—	—	—	—	—
1969	8	78	Cal Russell	Canada	RW	—	—	—	—	—	—	—	—	—
1970	2	17	Buster Harvey#	Canada	RW	407	90	118	208	131	—	—	—	—
1970	2	20	Fred Barrett#	Canada	D	745	25	123	148	671	—	—	—	—
1970	3	34	Dennis Patterson	Canada	D	138	6	22	28	67	—	—	—	—
1970	4	48	Dave Cressman↑	Canada	LW	85	6	8	14	37	—	—	—	—
1970	5	62	Hank Lehvonen	Canada	D	4	0	0	0	0	—	—	—	—
1970	6	76	Murray McNeil	Canada	W	—	—	—	—	—	—	—	—	—
1970	7	89	Gary Geldart↑	Canada	D	4	0	0	0	5	—	—	—	—
1970	8	101	Mickey Donaldson	Canada	LW	—	—	—	—	—	—	—	—	—
1971	2	21	Rod Norrish↑	Canada	LW	21	3	3	6	2	—	—	—	—
1971	3	35	Ron Wilson	Canada	D	—	—	—	—	—	—	—	—	—
1971	4	49	Mike Legge	Canada	D	—	—	—	—	—	—	—	—	—
1971	5	63	Brian McBratney	Canada	D	—	—	—	—	—	—	—	—	—
1971	6	77	Alan Globensky	Canada	D	—	—	—	—	—	—	—	—	—
1971	7	91	Bruce Abbey	Canada	D	—	—	—	—	—	—	—	—	—
1971	8	105	Russ Friesen	Canada	C	—	—	—	—	—	—	—	—	—
1971	9	113	Mike Antonovich#	United States	C	87	10	15	25	37	—	—	—	—
1971	10	117	Richard Coutu	Canada	G	—	—	—	—	—	—	—	—	—
1972	1	12	Jerry Byers#	Canada	F	45	3	4	7	15	—	—	—	—
1972	3	44	Terry Ryan	Canada	C	—	—	—	—	—	—	—	—	—
1972	4	60	Tom Thomson	Canada	D	—	—	—	—	—	—	—	—	—
1972	5	76	Chris Ahrens↑	United States	D	52	0	3	3	84	—	—	—	—
1972	6	92	Steve West	Canada	C	—	—	—	—	—	—	—	—	—
1972	7	108	Chris Meloff	Canada	D	—	—	—	—	—	—	—	—	—
1972	8	116	Scott MacPhail	Canada	RW	—	—	—	—	—	—	—	—	—
1972	8	124	Bob Lundeen	United States	RW	—	—	—	—	—	—	—	—	—
1972	9	140	Glen Mikkelson	Canada	RW	—	—	—	—	—	—	—	—	—
1972	10	145	Steve Lyon	Canada	RW	3	0	0	0	2	—	—	—	—
1972	10	147	Juri Kudrasovs	Canada	C	—	—	—	—	—	—	—	—	—
1972	10	148	Marcel Comeau	Canada	C	—	—	—	—	—	—	—	—	—
1973	2	18	Blake Dunlop#	Canada	F	550	130	274	404	172	—	—	—	—
1973	2	25	John Rogers↑	Canada	RW	14	2	4	6	0	—	—	—	—
1973	3	41	Rick Chinnick↑	Canada	F	4	0	2	2	0	—	—	—	—
1973	4	57	Tom Colley↑	Canada	C	1	0	0	0	2	—	—	—	—
1973	5	73	Lowell Ostlund	Canada	D	—	—	—	—	—	—	—	—	—
1973	6	89	David Lee	Canada	LW	—	—	—	—	—	—	—	—	—
1973	7	105	Lou Nistico	Canada	LW	3	0	0	0	6	—	—	—	—
1973	8	121	George Beveridge	Canada	D	—	—	—	—	—	—	—	—	—
1973	9	136	Jim Johnston	Canada	C	—	—	—	—	—	—	—	—	—
1973	10	152	Sam Clegg	Canada	G	—	—	—	—	—	—	—	—	—
1973	11	161	Russ Wiechnik	Canada	C	—	—	—	—	—	—	—	—	—
1973	11	163	Max Hansen	United States	LW	—	—	—	—	—	—	—	—	—
1974	1	6	Doug Hicks#	Canada	D	561	37	131	168	442	—	—	—	—
1974	2	24	Rich Nantais↑	Canada	LW	63	5	4	9	79	—	—	—	—
1974	3	42	Pete LoPresti#	United States	G	175	0	3	3	6	43	102	20	4.07
1974	4	60	Kim MacDougall↑	Canada	D	1	0	0	0	0	—	—	—	—
1974	5	78	Ron Ashton	Canada	LW	—	—	—	—	—	—	—	—	—
1974	6	96	John Sheridan	United States	C	—	—	—	—	—	—	—	—	—
1974	7	114	Dave Heitz	United States	G	—	—	—	—	—	—	—	—	—
1974	8	131	Roland Eriksson#	Sweden	C	193	48	95	143	26	—	—	—	—
1974	9	148	Dave Staffen	Canada	F	—	—	—	—	—	—	—	—	—
1974	10	164	Brian Andersen	Canada	D	—	—	—	—	—	—	—	—	—
1974	11	179	Duane Bray	Canada	D	—	—	—	—	—	—	—	—	—
1974	12	193	Don Hay	Canada	RW	—	—	—	—	—	—	—	—	—
1974	13	205	Brian Holderness	Canada	G	—	—	—	—	—	—	—	—	—
1974	14	215	Frank Taylor	Canada	D	—	—	—	—	—	—	—	—	—
1974	15	222	Jeff Hymanson	United States	D	—	—	—	—	—	—	—	—	—
1975	1	4	Bryan Maxwell#	Canada	D	331	18	77	95	745	—	—	—	—
1975	3	40	Paul Harrison#	Canada	G	109	0	1	1	28	28	59	9	4.22
1975	3	41	Alex Pirus#	Canada	C	159	30	28	58	94	—	—	—	—
1975	4	58	Steve Jensen#	United States	LW	438	113	108	221	318	—	—	—	—
1975	5	76	Dave Norris	Canada	LW	—	—	—	—	—	—	—	—	—
1975	6	94	Greg Clause	Canada	RW	—	—	—	—	—	—	—	—	—
1975	7	112	Francois Robert	Canada	D	—	—	—	—	—	—	—	—	—
1975	8	130	Dean Magee↑	Canada	C	7	0	0	0	4	—	—	—	—
1975	9	147	Terry Angel	Canada	RW	—	—	—	—	—	—	—	—	—
1975	10	163	Michel Blais	Canada	D	—	—	—	—	—	—	—	—	—
1975	11	177	Earl Sargent	United States	W	—	—	—	—	—	—	—	—	—
1975	12	190	Gilles Cloutier	Canada	G	—	—	—	—	—	—	—	—	—
1976	1	3	Glen Sharpley#	Canada	C	389	117	161	278	199	—	—	—	—
1976	2	31	Jim Roberts↑	Canada	LW	106	17	23	40	33	—	—	—	—
1976	3	39	Don Jackson#	United States	D	315	16	52	68	640	—	—	—	—
1976	3	51	Ron Zanussi#	Canada	RW	299	52	83	135	373	—	—	—	—
1976	4	57	Mike Fedorko	Canada	D	—	—	—	—	—	—	—	—	—
1976	5	75	Phil Verchota	United States	F	—	—	—	—	—	—	—	—	—
1976	6	93	Dave Delich	United States	C	—	—	—	—	—	—	—	—	—
1976	7	110	Jeff Barr	United States	D	—	—	—	—	—	—	—	—	—
1977	1	7	Brad Maxwell#	Canada	D	612	98	270	368	1292	—	—	—	—
1977	2	25	Dave Semenko	Canada	LW	575	65	88	153	1175	—	—	—	—
1977	4	61	Kevin McCloskey	United States	D	—	—	—	—	—	—	—	—	—
1977	5	79	Bob Parent	Canada	D	—	—	—	—	—	—	—	—	—
1977	6	97	Jamie Gallimore↑	Canada	RW	2	0	0	0	0	—	—	—	—
1977	7	115	Jean-Pierre Sanvido	Canada	G	—	—	—	—	—	—	—	—	—
1977	8	130	Greg Tebbutt	Canada	D	26	0	3	3	35	—	—	—	—
1977	9	145	Keith Hanson	United States	D	25	0	2	2	77	—	—	—	—
1978	1	1	Bobby Smith#	Canada	F	1077	357	679	1036	915	—	—	—	—
1978	2	19	Steve Payne↑	Canada	F	613	228	238	466	435	—	—	—	—
1978	2	24	Steve Christoff#	United States	C	248	77	64	141	108	—	—	—	—
1978	4	54	Curt Giles#	Canada	D	895	43	199	242	733	—	—	—	—
1978	5	70	Roy Kerling	Canada	C	—	—	—	—	—	—	—	—	—
1978	6	87	Bob Bergloff↑	United States	D	2	0	0	0	5	—	—	—	—
1978	7	104	Kim Spencer	Canada	D	—	—	—	—	—	—	—	—	—
1978	8	121	Mike Cotter	Canada	D	—	—	—	—	—	—	—	—	—
1978	9	138	Brent Gogol	Canada	RW	—	—	—	—	—	—	—	—	—
1978	10	155	Mike Seide	United States	D	—	—	—	—	—	—	—	—	—
1979	1	6	Craig Hartsburg↑	Canada	D	570	98	315	413	818	—	—	—	—
1979	1	10	Tom McCarthy#	Canada	F	460	178	221	399	330	—	—	—	—
1979	3	42	Neal Broten#	United States	C	1099	289	634	923	569	—	—	—	—
1979	3	63	Kevin Maxwell#	Canada	F	66	6	15	21	61	—	—	—	—
1979	5	90	Jim Dobson#	Canada	RW	12	0	0	0	6	—	—	—	—
1979	6	111	Brian Gualazzi	Canada	C	—	—	—	—	—	—	—	—	—
1980	1	16	Brad Palmer#	Canada	LW	168	32	38	70	58	—	—	—	—
1980	2	37	Don Beaupre#	Canada	G	667	0	8	8	283	268	277	75	3.45
1980	3	53	Randy Velischek#	Canada	D	509	21	76	97	401	—	—	—	—
1980	4	79	Mark Huglen	United States	F	—	—	—	—	—	—	—	—	—
1980	5	100	David Jensen↑	United States	D	18	0	2	2	11	—	—	—	—
1980	6	121	Dan Zavarise	Canada	D	—	—	—	—	—	—	—	—	—
1980	7	142	Bill Stewart	Canada	F	—	—	—	—	—	—	—	—	—
1980	8	163	Jeff Walters	Canada	RW	—	—	—	—	—	—	—	—	—
1980	9	184	Bob Lakso	United States	LW	—	—	—	—	—	—	—	—	—
1980	10	205	Dave Richter#	Canada	D	365	9	40	49	1030	—	—	—	—
1981	1	13	Ron Meighan#	Canada	D	48	3	7	10	18	—	—	—	—
1981	2	27	Dave Donnelly	Canada	F	137	15	24	39	150	—	—	—	—
1981	2	31	Mike Sands↑	Canada	G	6	0	0	0	2	0	5	0	5.17
1981	2	33	Tom Hirsch↑	United States	D	31	1	7	8	30	—	—	—	—
1981	2	34	Dave Preuss	United States	RW	—	—	—	—	—	—	—	—	—
1981	2	41	Jali Wahlsten	Finland	F	—	—	—	—	—	—	—	—	—
1981	4	69	Terry Tait	Canada	LW	—	—	—	—	—	—	—	—	—
1981	4	76	Jim Malwitz	United States	C	—	—	—	—	—	—	—	—	—
1981	5	97	Kelly Hubbard	Canada	D	—	—	—	—	—	—	—	—	—
1981	6	118	Paul Guay	United States	RW	117	11	23	34	92	—	—	—	—
1981	7	139	Jim Archibald↑	Canada	RW	16	1	2	3	45	—	—	—	—
1981	8	160	Kari Kanervo	Finland	C	—	—	—	—	—	—	—	—	—
1981	9	181	Scott Bjugstad#	United States	F	317	76	68	144	144	—	—	—	—
1981	10	202	Steve Kudebeh	United States	G	—	—	—	—	—	—	—	—	—
1982	1	2	Brian Bellows#	Canada	RW	1188	485	537	1022	718	—	—	—	—
1982	3	59	Wally Chapman	United States	C	—	—	—	—	—	—	—	—	—
1982	4	80	Bob Rouse#	Canada	D	1061	37	181	218	1559	—	—	—	—
1982	4	81	Dusan Pasek↑	Slovakia	C	48	4	10	14	30	—	—	—	—
1982	5	101	Marty Wiitala	United States	C	—	—	—	—	—	—	—	—	—
1982	6	122	Todd Carlile	United States	D	—	—	—	—	—	—	—	—	—
1982	7	143	Viktor Zhluktov	Russia	F	—	—	—	—	—	—	—	—	—
1982	8	164	Paul Miller	United States	D	—	—	—	—	—	—	—	—	—
1982	9	185	Pat Micheletti↑	United States	C	12	2	0	2	8	—	—	—	—
1982	10	206	Arnold Kadlec	Czech Republic	D	—	—	—	—	—	—	—	—	—
1982	11	227	Scott Knutson	United States	LW	—	—	—	—	—	—	—	—	—
1983	1	1	Brian Lawton#	United States	LW	483	112	154	266	401	—	—	—	—
1983	2	36	Malcolm Parks	Canada	F	—	—	—	—	—	—	—	—	—
1983	2	38	Frank Musil#	Czech Republic	D	797	34	106	140	1241	—	—	—	—
1983	3	56	Mitch Messier↑	Canada	RW	20	0	2	2	11	—	—	—	—
1983	4	76	Brian Durand	United States	C	—	—	—	—	—	—	—	—	—
1983	5	96	Rich Geist	United States	F	—	—	—	—	—	—	—	—	—
1983	6	116	Tom McComb	United States	D	—	—	—	—	—	—	—	—	—
1983	7	136	Sean Toomey↑	United States	C	1	0	0	0	0	—	—	—	—
1983	8	156	Don Biggs#	Canada	C	12	2	0	2	8	—	—	—	—
1983	9	176	Paul Pulis	United States	RW	—	—	—	—	—	—	—	—	—
1983	10	196	Milos Riha	Czech Republic	F	—	—	—	—	—	—	—	—	—
1983	11	212	Oldrich Valek	Czech Republic	RW	—	—	—	—	—	—	—	—	—
1983	12	236	Paul Roff	United States	RW	—	—	—	—	—	—	—	—	—
1984	1	13	David Quinn	United States	D	—	—	—	—	—	—	—	—	—
1984	3	46	Ken Hodge#	Canada	C	142	39	48	87	32	—	—	—	—
1984	4	76	Miroslav Maly	Germany	D	—	—	—	—	—	—	—	—	—
1984	5	89	Jiri Poner	Czech Republic	F	—	—	—	—	—	—	—	—	—
1984	5	97	Kari Takko#	Finland	G	142	0	2	2	30	37	71	14	3.90
1984	6	118	Gary McColgan	Canada	LW	—	—	—	—	—	—	—	—	—
1984	7	139	Vladimir Kyhos	Czech Republic	F	—	—	—	—	—	—	—	—	—
1984	8	160	Darin McInnis	United States	G	—	—	—	—	—	—	—	—	—
1984	9	181	Duane Wahlin	United States	F	—	—	—	—	—	—	—	—	—
1984	10	201	Mike Orn	United States	RW	—	—	—	—	—	—	—	—	—
1984	11	222	Tom Terwilliger	United States	D	—	—	—	—	—	—	—	—	—
1984	12	242	Mike Nightengale	United States	D	—	—	—	—	—	—	—	—	—
1985	3	51	Stephane Roy↑	Canada	C	12	1	0	1	0	—	—	—	—
1985	4	69	Mike Berger↑	Canada	D	30	3	1	4	67	—	—	—	—
1985	5	90	Dwight Mullins	Canada	RW	—	—	—	—	—	—	—	—	—
1985	6	111	Mike Mullowney	United States	D	—	—	—	—	—	—	—	—	—
1985	7	132	Mike Kelfer	United States	C	—	—	—	—	—	—	—	—	—
1985	8	153	Ross Johnson	United States	LW	—	—	—	—	—	—	—	—	—
1985	9	174	Tim Helmer	Canada	RW	—	—	—	—	—	—	—	—	—
1985	10	195	Gordie Ernst	United States	F	—	—	—	—	—	—	—	—	—
1985	11	216	Ladislav Lubina	Czech Republic	F	—	—	—	—	—	—	—	—	—
1985	12	237	Tommy Sjodin#	Sweden	D	106	8	40	48	52	—	—	—	—
1986	1	12	Warren Babe↑	Canada	LW	21	2	5	7	23	—	—	—	—
1986	2	30	Neil Wilkinson#	Canada	D	460	16	67	83	813	—	—	—	—
1986	2	33	Dean Kolstad#	Canada	D	40	1	7	8	69	—	—	—	—
1986	3	54	Rick Bennett	United States	LW	15	1	1	2	13	—	—	—	—
1986	3	55	Rob Zettler#	Canada	D	569	5	65	70	920	—	—	—	—
1986	3	58	Brad Turner	Canada	D	3	0	0	0	0	—	—	—	—
1986	4	75	Kirk Tomlinson↑	Canada	LW	1	0	0	0	0	—	—	—	—
1986	5	96	Jari Gronstrand#	Finland	D	185	8	26	34	135	—	—	—	—
1986	8	159	Scott Mathias	United States	F	—	—	—	—	—	—	—	—	—
1986	9	180	Lance Pitlick	United States	D	393	16	33	49	298	—	—	—	—
1986	10	201	Dan Keczmer#	United States	D	235	8	38	46	212	—	—	—	—
1986	11	222	Garth Joy	Canada	D	—	—	—	—	—	—	—	—	—
1986	12	243	Kurt Stahura	United States	LW	—	—	—	—	—	—	—	—	—
1986	S	15	Brian McKee	Canada	D	—	—	—	—	—	—	—	—	—
1987	1	6	Dave Archibald#	Canada	RW	323	57	67	124	139	—	—	—	—
1987	2	35	Scott McCrady	Canada	D	—	—	—	—	—	—	—	—	—
1987	3	48	Kevin Kaminski#	Canada	C	139	3	10	13	528	—	—	—	—
1987	4	73	John Weisbrod	United States	C	—	—	—	—	—	—	—	—	—
1987	5	88	Teppo Kivela	Finland	F	—	—	—	—	—	—	—	—	—
1987	6	109	Darcy Norton	Canada	LW	—	—	—	—	—	—	—	—	—
1987	7	130	Timo Kulonen	Finland	D	—	—	—	—	—	—	—	—	—
1987	8	151	Don Schmidt	Canada	D	—	—	—	—	—	—	—	—	—
1987	9	172	Jarmo Myllys#	Finland	G	39	0	1	1	4	4	27	1	5.23
1987	10	193	Larry Olimb	United States	C	—	—	—	—	—	—	—	—	—
1987	11	214	Marc Felicio	United States	G	—	—	—	—	—	—	—	—	—
1987	12	235	Dave Shields	Canada	C	—	—	—	—	—	—	—	—	—
1987	S	4	Shawn Chambers#	United States	D	625	50	185	235	364	—	—	—	—
1987	S	8	Rick Boh↑	Canada	C	8	2	1	3	4	—	—	—	—
1988	1	1	Mike Modano#†	United States	C	1499	561	813	1374	926	—	—	—	—
1988	2	40	Link Gaetz#	Canada	D	65	6	8	14	412	—	—	—	—
1988	3	43	Shaun Kane	United States	D	—	—	—	—	—	—	—	—	—
1988	4	64	Jeff Stolp	United States	G	—	—	—	—	—	—	—	—	—
1988	8	148	Ken MacArthur	Canada	D	—	—	—	—	—	—	—	—	—
1988	9	169	Travis Richards	United States	D	3	0	0	0	2	—	—	—	—
1988	10	190	Ari Matilainen	Finland	F	—	—	—	—	—	—	—	—	—
1988	11	211	Grant Bischoff	United States	F	—	—	—	—	—	—	—	—	—
1988	12	232	Trent Andison	United States	W	—	—	—	—	—	—	—	—	—
1988	S	1	Mike McHugh#	United States	LW	20	1	0	1	16	—	—	—	—
1988	S	6	Dave Schofield	United States	D	—	—	—	—	—	—	—	—	—
1989	1	7	Doug Zmolek	United States	D	467	11	53	64	905	—	—	—	—
1989	2	28	Mike Craig#	Canada	RW	423	71	97	168	550	—	—	—	—
1989	3	60	Murray Garbutt	Canada	C	—	—	—	—	—	—	—	—	—
1989	4	75	J. F. Quintin	Canada	LW	22	5	5	10	4	—	—	—	—
1989	5	87	Pat MacLeod#	Canada	D	53	5	13	18	14	—	—	—	—
1989	5	91	Bryan Schoen	Canada	G	—	—	—	—	—	—	—	—	—
1989	5	97	Rhys Hollyman	Canada	D	—	—	—	—	—	—	—	—	—
1989	6	112	Scott Cashman	Canada	G	—	—	—	—	—	—	—	—	—
1989	8	154	Jon Pratt	United States	LW	—	—	—	—	—	—	—	—	—
1989	9	175	Ken Blum	United States	LW	—	—	—	—	—	—	—	—	—
1989	10	196	Arturs Irbe	Latvia	G	568	0	9	9	90	218	236	79	2.83
1989	11	217	Tom Pederson	United States	D	240	20	49	69	142	—	—	—	—
1989	12	238	Helmuts Balderis↑	Latvia	RW	26	3	6	9	2	—	—	—	—
1989	S	12	Jamie Loewen	Canada	G	—	—	—	—	—	—	—	—	—
1990	1	8	Derian Hatcher#	United States	D	1045	80	251	331	1581	—	—	—	—
1990	3	50	Laurie Billeck	Canada	D	—	—	—	—	—	—	—	—	—
1990	4	70	Cal McGowan	United States	C	—	—	—	—	—	—	—	—	—
1990	4	71	Frank Kovacs	Canada	LW	—	—	—	—	—	—	—	—	—
1990	5	92	Enrico Ciccone#	Canada	D	374	10	18	28	1469	—	—	—	—
1990	6	113	Roman Turek	Czech Republic	G	328	0	12	12	30	159	115	43	2.31
1990	7	134	Jeff Levy	United States	G	—	—	—	—	—	—	—	—	—
1990	8	155	Doug Barrault#	United States	RW	4	0	0	0	2	—	—	—	—
1990	9	176	Joe Biondi	United States	C	—	—	—	—	—	—	—	—	—
1990	10	197	Troy Binnie	Canada	LW	—	—	—	—	—	—	—	—	—
1990	11	218	Ole Dahlstrom	Norway	C	—	—	—	—	—	—	—	—	—
1990	12	239	J. P. McKersie	United States	G	—	—	—	—	—	—	—	—	—
1990	S	13	Rod Houk	Canada	G	—	—	—	—	—	—	—	—	—
1991	1	8	Richard Matvichuk#	Canada	D	796	39	139	178	624	—	—	—	—
1991	4	74	Mike Torchia	Canada	G	6	0	0	0	0	3	2	1	3.30
1991	5	97	Mike Kennedy	Canada	C	145	16	36	52	112	—	—	—	—
1991	6	118	Mark Lawrence	Canada	RW	142	18	26	44	115	—	—	—	—
1991	7	137	Geoff Finch	Canada	G	—	—	—	—	—	—	—	—	—
1991	8	174	Michael Burkett	Canada	LW	—	—	—	—	—	—	—	—	—
1991	9	184	Derek Herlofsky	United States	G	—	—	—	—	—	—	—	—	—
1991	10	206	Tom Nemeth	Canada	D	—	—	—	—	—	—	—	—	—
1991	11	228	Shayne Green	Canada	C	—	—	—	—	—	—	—	—	—
1991	12	250	Jukka Suomalainen	Finland	D	—	—	—	—	—	—	—	—	—
1991	S	14	Dan O'Shea	United States	F	—	—	—	—	—	—	—	—	—
1992	2	34	Jarkko Varvio	Finland	RW	13	3	4	7	4	—	—	—	—
1992	3	58	Jeff Bes	Canada	C	—	—	—	—	—	—	—	—	—
1992	4	88	Jere Lehtinen	Finland	RW	875	243	271	514	210	—	—	—	—
1992	6	130	Mike Johnson	Canada	D	—	—	—	—	—	—	—	—	—
1992	7	154	Kyle Peterson	Canada	LW	—	—	—	—	—	—	—	—	—
1992	8	178	Juha Lind	Finland	LW	133	9	13	22	20	—	—	—	—
1992	9	202	Lars Edstrom	Sweden	LW	—	—	—	—	—	—	—	—	—
1992	10	226	Jeff Romfo	United States	RW	—	—	—	—	—	—	—	—	—
1992	11	250	Jeff Moen	United States	G	—	—	—	—	—	—	—	—	—

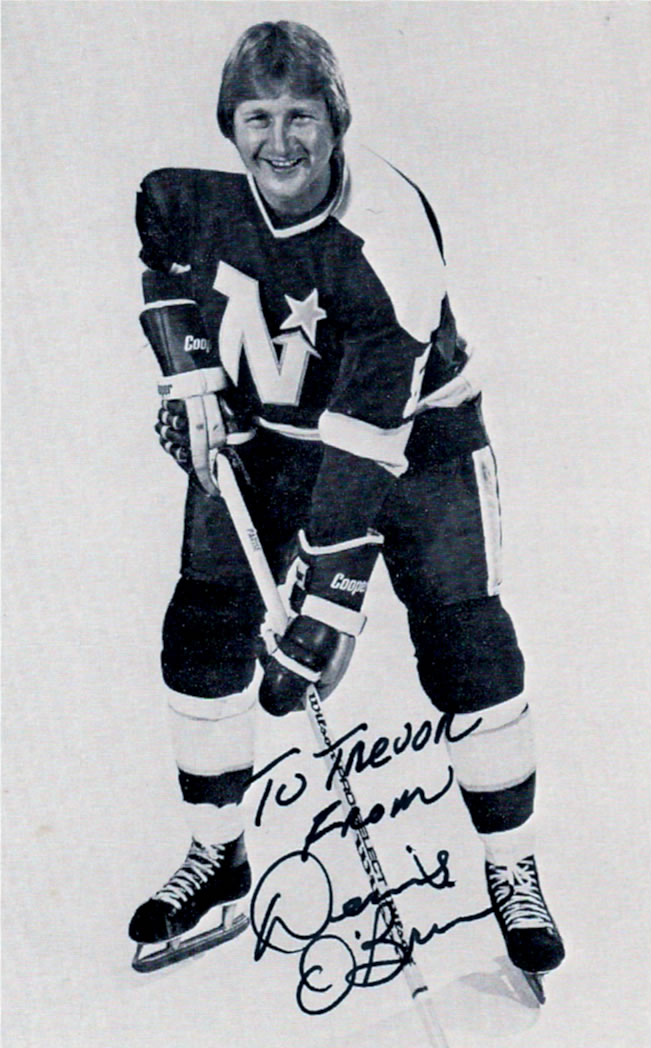
The North Stars selected Dennis O'Brien 14th overall in the 1969 NHL Amateur Draft.

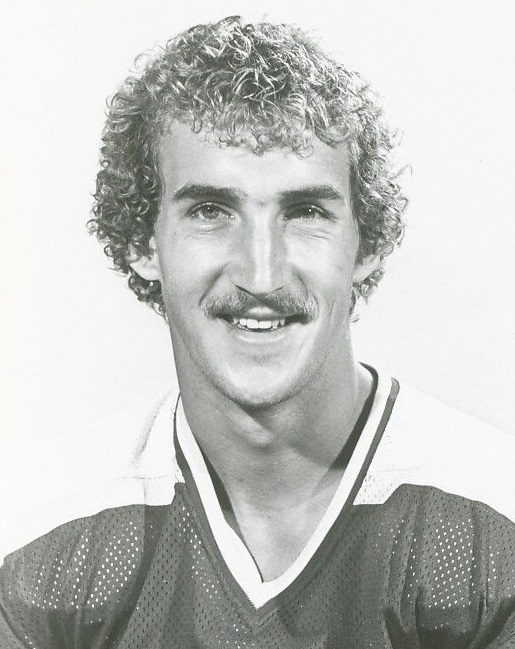
The North Stars selected Steve Payne 19th overall in the 1978 NHL Amateur Draft.

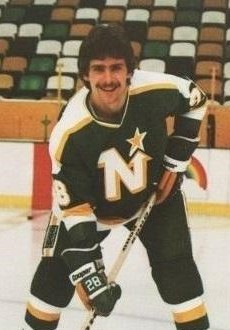
The North Stars selected Steve Christoff 24th overall in the 1978 NHL Amateur Draft.

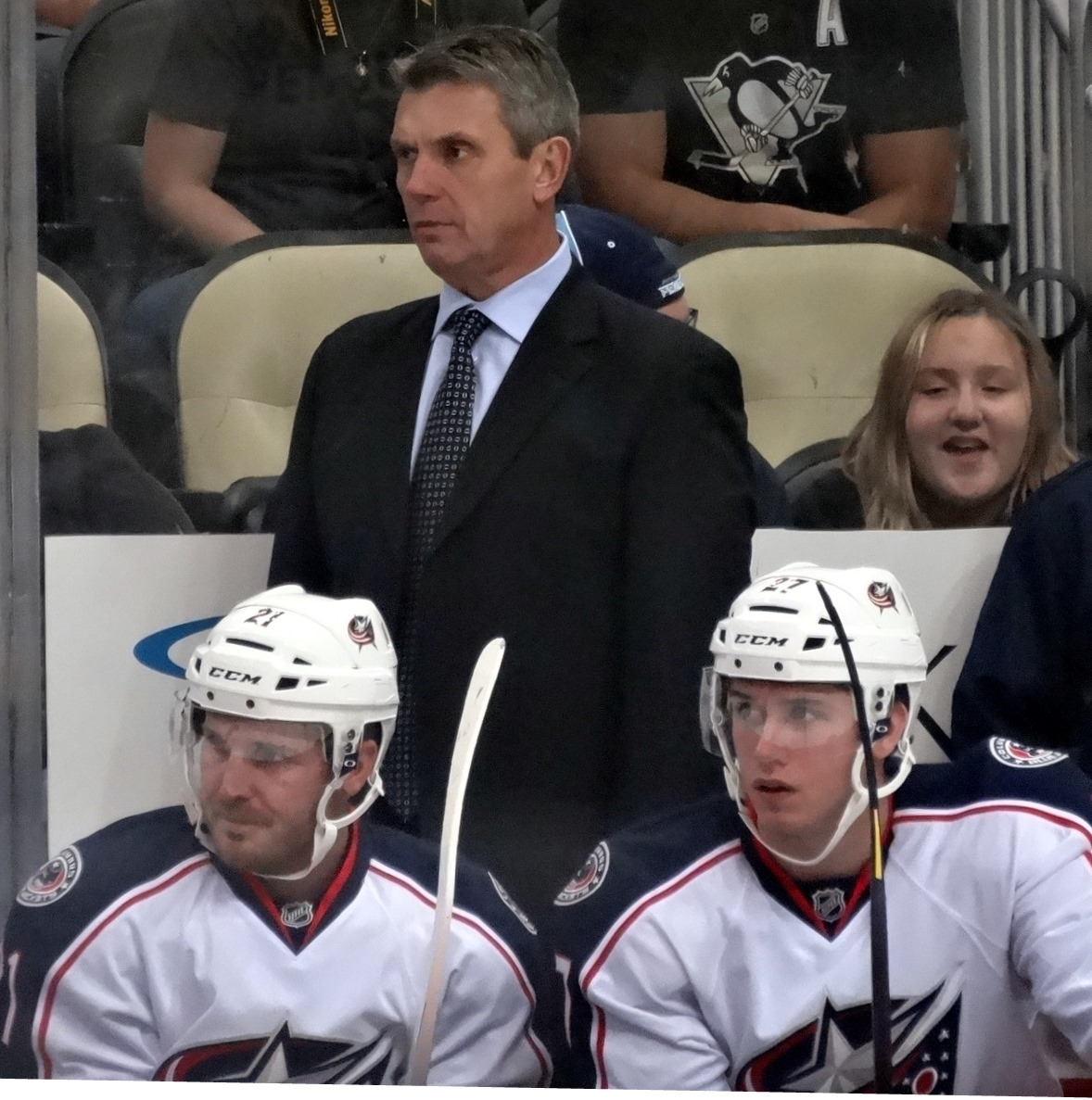
The North Stars selected Craig Hartsburg 6th overall in the 1979 NHL entry draft.

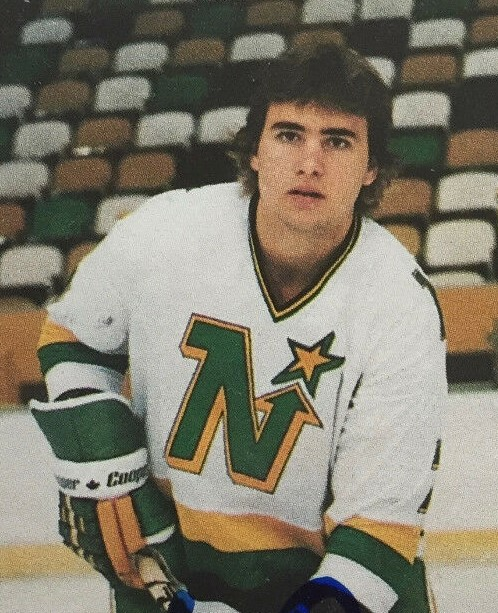
The North Stars selected Neal Broten 42nd overall in the 1979 NHL Entry Draft.

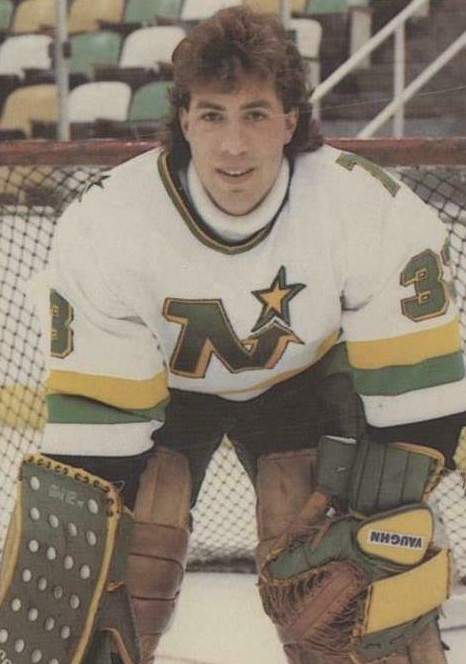
The North Stars selected Don Beaupre 37th overall in the 1980 NHL entry draft.

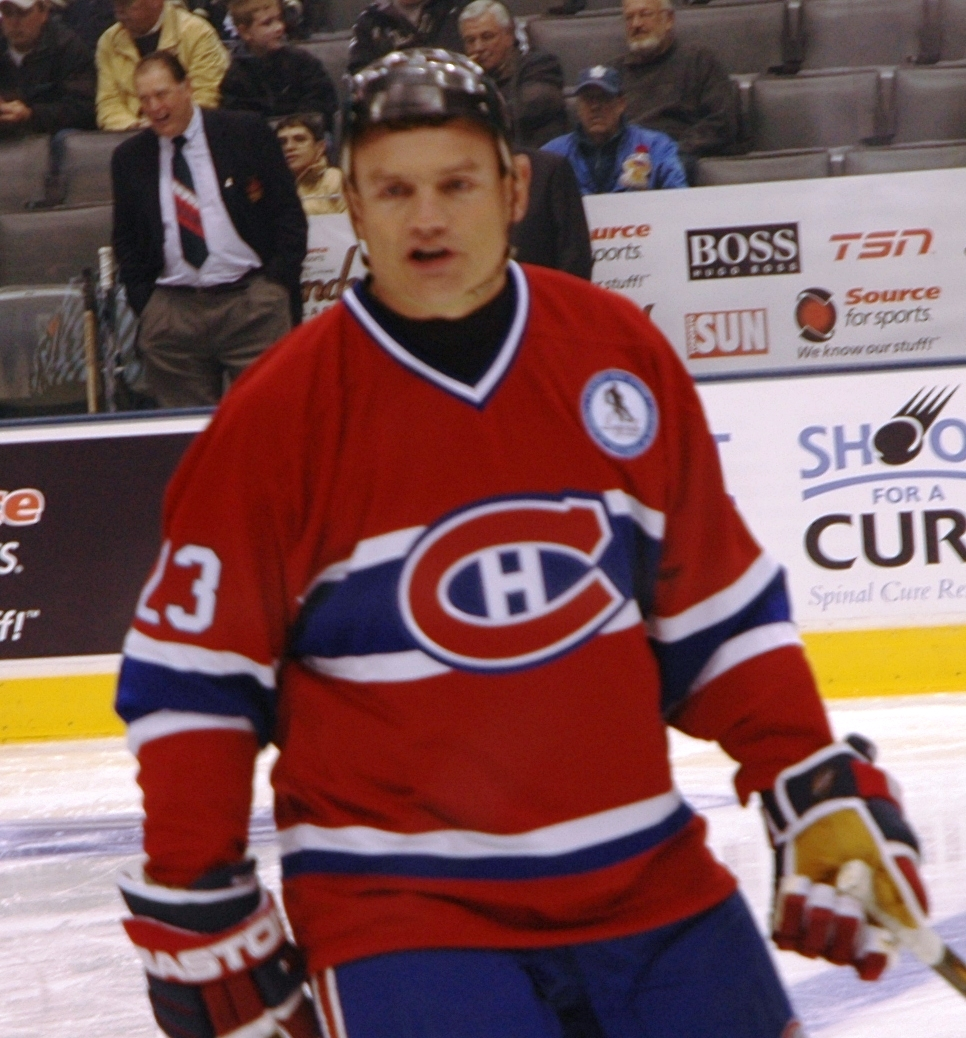
The North Stars selected Brian Bellows 2nd overall in the 1982 NHL entry draft.

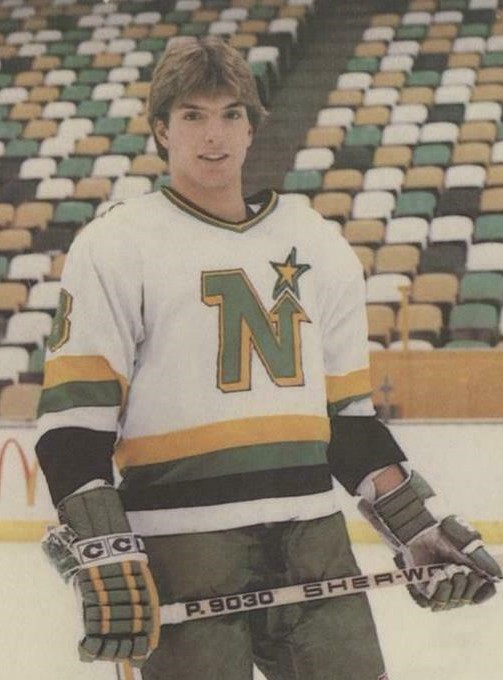
The North Stars selected Brian Lawton 1st overall in the 1983 NHL entry draft.

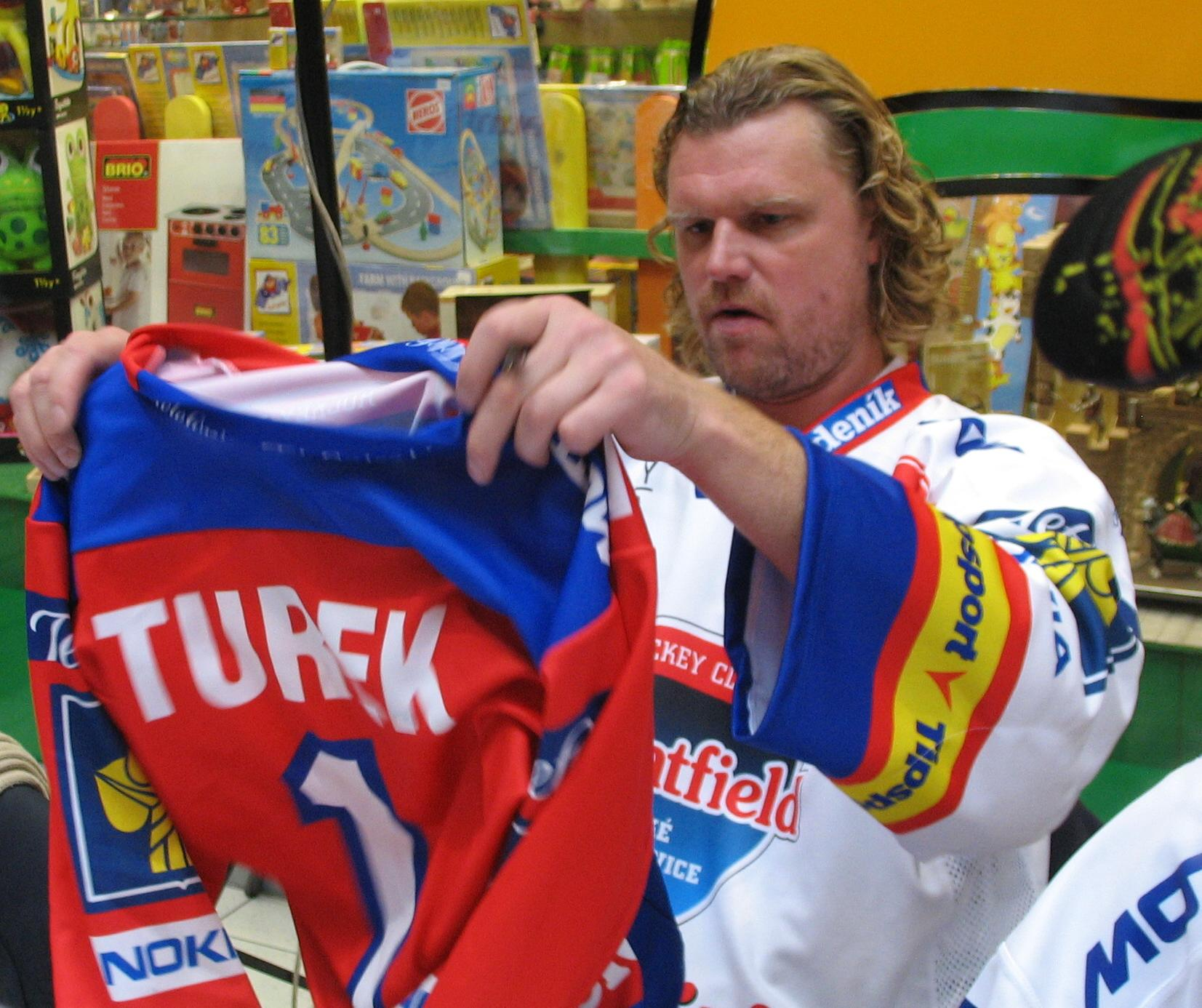
The North Stars selected Roman Turek 113th overall in the 1990 NHL entry draft.

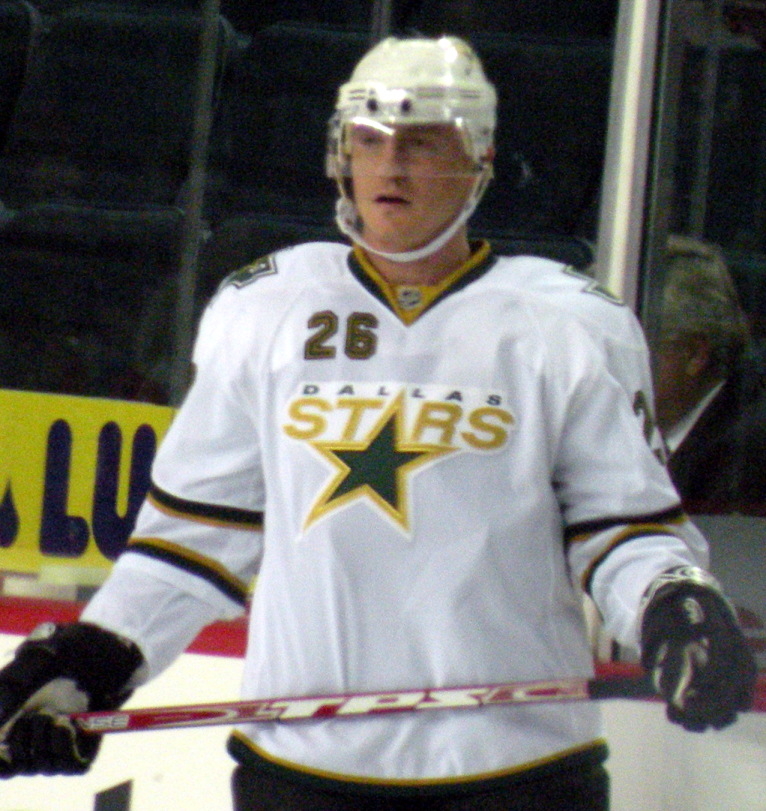
The North Stars selected Jere Lehtinen 88th overall in the 1992 NHL entry draft.

== See also ==
- List of Minnesota North Stars players
- 1967 NHL Expansion Draft
- 1991 NHL Dispersal and Expansion Drafts
- List of Dallas Stars draft picks
