= Al Blanchard =

Canadian ice hockey player (born 1952)

- Born: June 12, 1952 (age 73) Sudbury, Ontario, Canada
- Height: 6 ft 0 in (183 cm)
- Weight: 195 lb (88 kg; 13 st 13 lb)
- Position: Right Wing
- Shot: Left
- Played for: Providence Reds (AHL); Springfield Kings (AHL); Springfield Indians (AHL); Saginaw Gears (IHL)
- NHL draft: 10th overall, 1972; New York Rangers
- Playing career: 1972–1976

Al Blanchard (born June 12, 1952) is a Canadian former professional ice hockey right winger. While playing for the Kitchener Rangers during the 1971-72 season, Blanchard shared a line with Bill Barber and Jerry Byers. All three men went on to be drafted in the first round of the 1972 NHL Amateur Draft He was drafted in the first round, 10th overall, by the New York Rangers in the 1972 NHL Amateur Draft. In March 1974, Blanchard was traded to the Los Angeles Kings for Wayne Chernecki. He never played in the National Hockey League, however, spending his professional career in the American Hockey League and International Hockey League.

== Career statistics ==
			Regular season					Playoffs
Season	Team	League	GP	G	A	Pts	PIM	GP	G	A	Pts	PIM
1968–69	Garson-Falconbridge Combines	NOJHA	10	5	5	10	0	—	—	—	—	—
1969–70	Sudbury Wolves	NOJHA	40	37	44	81	84	12	3	4	7	16
1970–71	Sudbury Wolves	NOJHA	40	65	48	113	51	10	10	10	20	9
1971–72	Kitchener Rangers	OHA-Jr.	61	50	45	95	19	—	—	—	—	—
1972–73	Providence Reds	AHL	71	22	16	38	18	4	2	0	2	0
1973–74	Providence Reds	AHL	53	12	13	25	10	—	—	—	—	—
1973–74	Springfield Indians	AHL	4	0	2	2	0	—	—	—	—	—
1974–75	Springfield Indians	AHL	37	6	5	11	16	—	—	—	—	—
1975–76	Springfield Indians	AHL	1	0	0	0	4	—	—	—	—	—
1975–76	Saginaw Gears	IHL	31	10	12	22	9	—	—	—	—	—
AHL totals			166	40	36	76	48	4	2	0	2	0

Preceded by Steve Durbano	New York Rangers first-round draft pick 1972	Succeeded by Bob MacMillan
