= Brian Bowles =

Brian Bowles may refer to:

- Brian Bowles (fighter) (born 1980), American mixed martial artist
- Brian Bowles (baseball) (born 1976), American Major League Baseball relief pitcher
- Brian Bowles (ice hockey) (born 1952), Canadian ice hockey player
- Brian Bowles (voice actor) in Simon the Sorcerer series
