= Bob MacMillan =

Canadian ice hockey player and politician

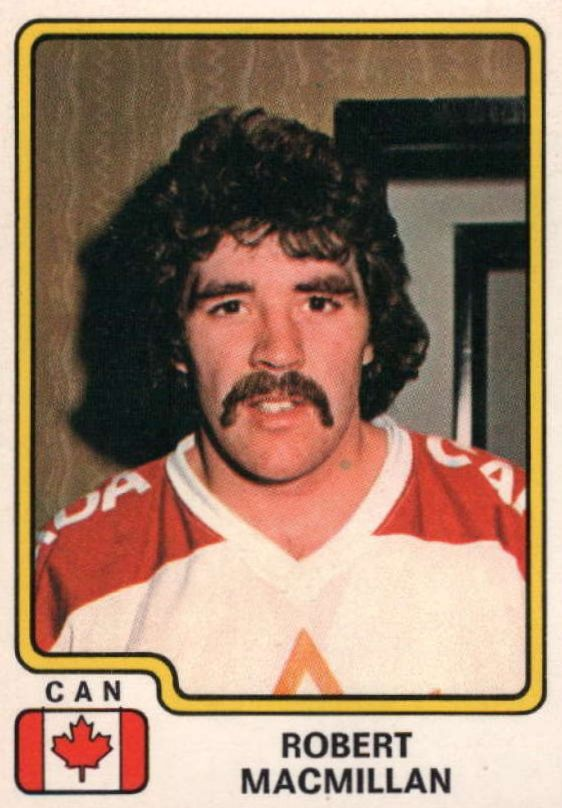
- Born: December 3, 1952 (age 73); Charlottetown, Prince Edward Island, Canada
- Occupations: athlete; politician; businessperson
- Political party: Progressive Conservative
Ice hockey career
- Height: 5 ft 11 in (180 cm)
- Weight: 185 lb (84 kg; 13 st 3 lb)
- Position: Centre
- Shot: Left
- Played for: Minnesota Fighting Saints; New York Rangers; St. Louis Blues; Atlanta Flames; Calgary Flames; Colorado Rockies; New Jersey Devils; Chicago Black Hawks
- NHL draft: 15th overall, 1972; New York Rangers
- Playing career: 1972–1985
Medal record
Representing Canada
Ice hockey
World Championships
Bronze medal – third place	1978 Prague

MLA for Charlottetown-Kings Square
- In office 2000–2003
- Preceded by: Richard Brown
- Succeeded by: Richard Brown

Robert Lea MacMillan (born December 3, 1952) is a Canadian former professional ice hockey forward and a former politician who served in the Legislative Assembly of Prince Edward Island. During his hockey career, he played two seasons in the World Hockey Association (WHA), followed by eleven seasons in the National Hockey League (NHL), from 1974–75 until 1984–85. He helped the Calgary Flames reach the NHL playoff semifinals for the first time in 1981.

== Hockey career ==
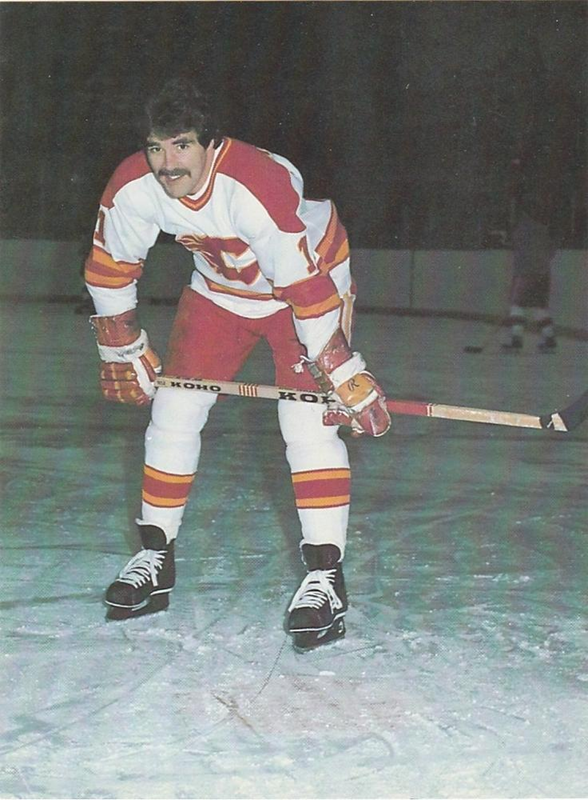
1980 postcard of MacMillan for Calgary Flames

As a youth, MacMillan played in the 1964 and 1965 Quebec International Pee-Wee Hockey Tournaments with a minor ice hockey team from Charlottetown. He was drafted 15th overall by the New York Rangers in the 1972 NHL Amateur Draft. He was traded along with Dick Redmond, Yves Bélanger and a second-round selection in the 1979 NHL entry draft (23rd overall–Mike Perovich) from the St. Louis Blues to the Atlanta Flames for Phil Myre, Curt Bennett and Barry Gibbs on December 12, 1977. Upon his retirement, MacMillan returned to Charlottetown to coach senior hockey. After two years behind the bench he made a brief comeback to the ice when he dressed for two games with the Charlottetown Islanders in the 1987–88 season and scored four points.

== Political career ==
MacMillan served in the Prince Edward Island legislature from 2000–2003, as part of Pat Binns's Progressive Conservative government.

== Personal life ==
MacMillan is the brother of former player and coach Bill MacMillan. MacMillan is the father of Logan MacMillan, the first-round pick (19th overall) of the Anaheim Ducks in the 2007 NHL entry draft, Brad MacMillan, owner of 'Chuck Hatchets', and 'The Whiskey Pub and Kitchen', and Cole MacMillan, who most recently played hockey at University of Prince Edward Island. He currently owns and operates The Sport Page Club, a sports bar in downtown Charlottetown.

== Career statistics ==
=== Regular season and playoffs ===
			Regular season					Playoffs
Season	Team	League	GP	G	A	Pts	PIM	GP	G	A	Pts	PIM
1969–70	Charlottetown Islanders	MJrHL	40	33	35	68	38	15	12	8	20	13
1969–70	Charlottetown Islanders	M-Cup	—	—	—	—	—	15	7	14	21	11
1970–71	St. Catharines Black Hawks	OHA	59	41	62	103	93	15	9	14	23	24
1971–72	St. Catharines Black Hawks	OHA	39	12	41	53	41	5	1	1	2	14
1972–73	Minnesota Fighting Saints	WHA	75	13	27	40	48	5	0	3	3	0
1973–74	Minnesota Fighting Saints	WHA	78	14	34	48	81	11	2	3	5	4
1974–75	Providence Reds	AHL	46	18	29	47	58	6	3	2	5	17
1974–75	New York Rangers	NHL	22	1	2	3	4	—	—	—	—	—
1975–76	St. Louis Blues	NHL	80	20	32	52	41	3	0	1	1	0
1976–77	St. Louis Blues	NHL	80	19	39	58	11	4	0	1	1	0
1977–78	St. Louis Blues	NHL	28	7	12	19	23	—	—	—	—	—
1977–78	Atlanta Flames	NHL	52	31	21	52	26	2	0	2	2	0
1978–79	Atlanta Flames	NHL	77	37	71	108	14	2	0	1	1	0
1979–80	Atlanta Flames	NHL	77	22	39	61	10	4	0	0	0	9
1980–81	Calgary Flames	NHL	77	28	35	63	47	16	8	6	14	7
1981–82	Calgary Flames	NHL	23	4	7	11	14	—	—	—	—	—
1981–82	Colorado Rockies	NHL	57	18	32	50	27	—	—	—	—	—
1982–83	New Jersey Devils	NHL	71	19	29	48	8	—	—	—	—	—
1983–84	New Jersey Devils	NHL	71	17	23	40	23	—	—	—	—	—
1984–85	Chicago Black Hawks	NHL	36	5	7	12	12	—	—	—	—	—
1984–85	Milwaukee Admirals	IHL	8	2	2	4	2	—	—	—	—	—
1985–86	Charlottetown Islanders	NBSHL	—	—	—	—	—	—	—	—	—	—
1986–87	Charlottetown Islanders	NBSHL	—	—	—	—	—	—	—	—	—	—
1987–88	Charlottetown Islanders	NBSHL	2	2	2	4	0	—	—	—	—	—
WHA totals			153	27	61	88	129	16	2	6	8	4
NHL totals			753	228	349	577	260	31	8	11	19	16

=== International ===
Year	Team	Event	GP	G	A	Pts	PIM
1978	Canada	WC	10	0	3	3	6

Preceded by Al Blanchard	New York Rangers first-round draft pick 1972	Succeeded by Rick Middleton
Preceded by Butch Goring	Winner of the Lady Byng Trophy; 1979	Succeeded by Wayne Gretzky
