= Dennis McCord (ice hockey) =

Canadian ice hockey player

- Born: July 28, 1952 Chatham, Ontario, Canada
- Died: February 7, 2005 (aged 52)
- Height: 5 ft 10 in (178 cm)
- Weight: 190 lb (86 kg; 13 st 8 lb)
- Position: Defence
- Shot: Left
- Played for: Vancouver Canucks
- NHL draft: 115th overall, 1972; Vancouver Canucks
- Playing career: 1972–1976

Dennis Frederick McCord (July 28, 1952 – February 7, 2005) was a Canadian professional ice hockey player who played three games in the National Hockey League for the Vancouver Canucks in 1974.

== Early life ==
Born in Chatham, Ontario, McCord played his junior hockey for the Chatham Maroons, before being selected by Toronto fifth overall in the 1969 midget draft. Toronto traded him to Kitchener in January 1970, but he left the team in March to return home to the Maroons. After an all-star season with Chatham in 1970-71, he was traded to the London Knights and was selected 115th overall in the 1972 NHL Amateur Draft by the Vancouver Canucks. He turned pro the following season and was assigned to the Seattle Totems, Vancouver's top minor-league affiliate.

== Career ==
McCord played for two seasons in Seattle, posting totals of 28 and 37 points, and established himself as an NHL prospect. At the close of the 1973–74 season, McCord was given a three-game call-up to Vancouver. However, his career was derailed by injuries, and he appeared in only 26 games for Seattle the following season. After one more season in the minors with the Fort Wayne Komets, he retired in 1976.

== Personal life ==
McCord died in 2005. In 2008, he was posthumously elected to the Chatham Sports Hall of Fame in his hometown of Chatham, Ontario.

== Career statistics ==
=== Regular season and playoffs ===
			Regular season					Playoffs
Season	Team	League	GP	G	A	Pts	PIM	GP	G	A	Pts	PIM
1969–70	Toronto Marlboros	OHA	14	1	2	3	34	—	—	—	—	—
1969–70	Kitchener Rangers	OHA	23	1	1	2	50	—	—	—	—	—
1970–71	Chatham Maroons	SOJHL	—	—	—	—	—	—	—	—	—	—
1971–72	London Knights	OHA	59	9	31	40	123	—	—	—	—	—
1972–73	Seattle Totems	WHL	71	5	23	28	100	—	—	—	—	—
1973–74	Vancouver Canucks	NHL	3	0	0	0	6	—	—	—	—	—
1973–74	Seattle Totems	WHL	74	4	33	37	57	—	—	—	—	—
1974–75	Seattle Totems	CHL	26	0	8	8	38	—	—	—	—	—
1975–76	Fort Wayne Komets	IHL	59	6	17	23	57	9	1	4	5	26
1975–76	Tulsa Oilers	CHL	9	2	5	7	6	—	—	—	—	—
NHL totals			3	0	0	0	6	—	—	—	—	—
