= Marty Gateman =

Canadian ice hockey player

- Born: December 7, 1952 (age 73) Southampton, Ontario, Canada
- Height: 6 ft 0 in (183 cm)
- Weight: 185 lb (84 kg; 13 st 3 lb)
- Position: Defence
- Shot: Left
- Played for: New England Whalers
- NHL draft: 79th overall, 1972; New York Rangers
- Playing career: 1972–1977

John Martin "Marty" Gateman (born December 7, 1952, in Southampton, Ontario) is a Canadian retired ice hockey defenceman.

Gateman played junior hockey for the Hamilton Red Wings in the Ontario Hockey Association. He was drafted 79th overall by the New York Rangers in the 1972 NHL Amateur Draft but never played in the National Hockey League. Gateman turned pro in 1972 with the Central Hockey League's Omaha Knights. He then spent three years in the American Hockey League with the Providence Reds. He moved to the Cape Codders of the North American Hockey League before playing 12 games for the New England Whalers of the World Hockey Association and then returning to the NAHL with the Binghamton Dusters. Gateman spent one final year in the International Hockey League with the Fort Wayne Komets and back in the American Hockey League with the Rhode Island Reds before retiring in 1977.

== Career statistics ==
=== Regular season and playoffs ===
			Regular season					Playoffs
Season	Team	League	GP	G	A	Pts	PIM	GP	G	A	Pts	PIM
1970–71	Mount Hamilton B's	NDJBHL	Statistics Unavailable
1970–71	Hamilton Red Wings	OHA	19	0	1	1	14	—	—	—	—	—
1971–72	Hamilton Red Wings	OHA	61	0	10	10	92	—	—	—	—	—
1972–73	Providence Reds	AHL	30	0	3	3	53	3	0	1	1	4
1972–73	Omaha Knights	CHL	37	5	9	14	65	—	—	—	—	—
1973–74	Providence Reds	AHL	56	2	14	16	102	10	0	0	0	21
1974–75	Providence Reds	AHL	67	5	12	17	130	6	0	1	1	8
1975–76	Cape Codders	NAHL	31	3	5	8	54	—	—	—	—	—
1975–76	New England Whalers	WHA	12	0	1	1	6	—	—	—	—	—
1975–76	Broome County Dusters	NAHL	19	1	4	5	17	—	—	—	—	—
1976–77	Fort Wayne Komets	IHL	23	1	10	11	12	—	—	—	—	—
1976–77	Rhode Island Reds	AHL	4	0	2	2	0	—	—	—	—	—
WHA totals			12	0	1	1	6	—	—	—	—	—
