= Jim Benzelock =

Canadian ice hockey player (born 1947)

- Born: June 21, 1947 (age 79) Winnipeg, Manitoba, Canada
- Height: 5 ft 10 in (178 cm)
- Weight: 187 lb (85 kg; 13 st 5 lb)
- Position: Right Wing
- Shot: Right
- Played for: WHA; Alberta Oilers; Chicago Cougars; Quebec Nordiques
- NHL draft: 5th overall, 1968; Minnesota North Stars
- Playing career: 1968–1976

James John Benzelock (born June 21, 1947) is a former professional ice hockey right winger. He was drafted in the first round, fifth overall, by the Minnesota North Stars in the 1968 NHL Amateur Draft. He never played in the National Hockey League; however, he appeared in 166 World Hockey Association games with the Alberta Oilers, Chicago Cougars, and Quebec Nordiques. Benzelock played the majority of his career with teams in the minor professional leagues (CHL, IHL, NAHL).

== Career statistics ==
=== Regular season and playoffs ===
			Regular season					Playoffs
Season	Team	League	GP	G	A	Pts	PIM	GP	G	A	Pts	PIM
1964–65	Winnipeg Warriors	MJHL	Statistics Unavailable
1965–66	Winnipeg Braves	MJHL	Statistics Unavailable
1966–67	St. James Braves	MJHL	––	35	31	66	92	—	—	—	—	—
1967–68	Winnipeg Jets	WCJHL	58	43	50	93	168	—	—	—	—	—
1968–69	Memphis South Stars	CHL	69	11	17	28	81	—	—	—	—	—
1969–70	Iowa Stars	CHL	71	11	9	20	76	11	5	4	9	12
1970–71	Dayton Gems	IHL	28	12	10	22	41	10	6	4	10	10
1971–72	Dayton Gems	IHL	68	44	31	75	120	5	2	2	4	15
1972–73	Alberta Oilers	WHA	26	1	1	2	10	—	—	—	—	—
1972–73	Chicago Cougars	WHA	43	9	12	21	23	—	—	—	—	—
1973–74	Long Island Cougars	NAHL	3	2	1	3	2	—	—	—	—	—
1973–74	Chicago Cougars	WHA	53	6	7	13	19	18	2	2	4	36
1974–75	Long Island Cougars	NAHL	6	3	1	4	11	—	—	—	—	—
1974–75	Chicago Cougars	WHA	10	0	2	2	14	—	—	—	—	—
1974–75	Tulsa Oilers	CHL	41	13	18	31	85	2	0	0	0	2
1975–76	Quebec Nordiques	WHA	34	2	5	7	6	3	0	0	0	0
1975–76	Maine Nordiques	NAHL	21	8	9	17	13	4	1	5	6	25
1977–78	Elmwood Millionaires	CSHL	––	13	16	29	37	—	—	—	—	—
WHA totals			166	18	27	45	72	21	2	2	4	36

Preceded by Wayne Cheesman	Minnesota North Stars first-round draft pick 1968	Succeeded by Dick Redmond
