= Steve Durbano =

Canadian ice hockey player (1951–2002)

- Born: December 12, 1951 Toronto, Ontario, Canada
- Died: November 16, 2002 (aged 50) Yellowknife, Northwest Territories, Canada
- Height: 6 ft 1 in (185 cm)
- Weight: 210 lb (95 kg; 15 st 0 lb)
- Position: Defence
- Shot: Left
- Played for: Colorado Rockies; Kansas City Scouts; Pittsburgh Penguins; St. Louis Blues; Birmingham Bulls
- NHL draft: 13th overall, 1971; New York Rangers
- Playing career: 1971–1979

Harry Steven Durbano (December 12, 1951 – November 16, 2002) was a Canadian professional ice hockey player noted for his villainous behaviour on the ice and his larger-than-life persona off it.

== Career ==
Born in Toronto, Durbano rose through minor hockey to a place on the Toronto Marlboros of the Ontario Hockey Association. He was drafted by the New York Rangers in the first round of the 1971 NHL Amateur Draft. He never played a game for the Rangers, though, and was traded to the St. Louis Blues where he began his career. Durbano quickly gained a reputation for being one of the toughest players in the league, amassing 1,411 major league-career penalty minutes, including an NHL-leading 370 PIM in the 1975–76 season.

He played 220 NHL games over the course of his career for St. Louis as well as the Pittsburgh Penguins, Kansas City Scouts and Colorado Rockies, along with 45 games in the World Hockey Association for the Birmingham Bulls.

In the very first game of the 1974–75 season, he was checked by Philadelphia Flyers defenceman Andre Dupont and suffered a fractured left wrist. He missed the rest of the season, and though he returned the following season, he never regained full power in the wrist.

== Post-career and death ==
Durbano last played in the NHL in the 1978–79 season. He was arrested on February 7, 1981, at Toronto International Airport aboard an Air Canada flight from Miami; the Royal Canadian Mounted Police seized about 474 grams of cocaine, estimated by police to be worth about $71,000. Durbano was convicted for cocaine smuggling in 1984, and was sentenced to seven years in prison. Durbano also admitted to using cocaine regularly while playing in the NHL. After his release, he was arrested once for shoplifting, and, in 1995, he was sent back to prison after he attempted to recruit an undercover police officer into an escort service in Welland, Ontario. He later moved to the Northwest Territories to seek a calmer life, and died there on November 16, 2002, of liver cancer at the age of 50.

== Career statistics ==
Bold indicates led league

			Regular season					Playoffs
Season	Team	League	GP	G	A	Pts	PIM	GP	G	A	Pts	PIM
1967–68	York Steel	MetJHL	21	1	9	10		—	—	—	—	—
1968–69	Toronto Marlboros	OHA-Jr.	45	5	6	11	158	4	0	1	1	17
1969–70	Toronto Marlboros	OHA-Jr.	53	7	25	32	371	16	2	3	5	49
1970–71	Toronto Marlboros	OHA-Jr.	49	7	32	39	324	12	2	2	4	75
1971–72	Omaha Knights	CHL	70	7	34	41	402	—	—	—	—	—
1972–73	St. Louis Blues	NHL	49	3	18	21	231	5	0	2	2	8
1973–74	St. Louis Blues	NHL	36	4	5	9	146	—	—	—	—	—
1973–74	Pittsburgh Penguins	NHL	33	4	14	18	138	—	—	—	—	—
1974–75	Pittsburgh Penguins	NHL	1	0	1	1	10	—	—	—	—	—
1975–76	Pittsburgh Penguins	NHL	32	0	8	8	**161**	—	—	—	—	—
1975–76	Kansas City Scouts	NHL	37	1	11	12	**209**	—	—	—	—	—
1976–77	Rhode Island Reds	AHL	9	1	2	3	55	—	—	—	—	—
1976–77	Colorado Rockies	NHL	19	0	2	2	129	—	—	—	—	—
1977–78	Birmingham Bulls	WHA	45	6	4	10	284	4	0	2	2	16
1978–79	St. Louis Blues	NHL	13	1	1	2	103	—	—	—	—	—
1978–79	Salt Lake Golden Eagles	CHL	10	1	4	5	41	—	—	—	—	—
NHL totals			220	13	60	73	1127	5	0	2	2	8
WHA totals			45	6	4	10	284	4	0	2	2	16

Preceded by Steve Vickers	New York Rangers first-round draft pick 1971	Succeeded by Al Blanchard
