= Billy Harris (ice hockey, born 1952) =

Canadian ice hockey player (born 1952)

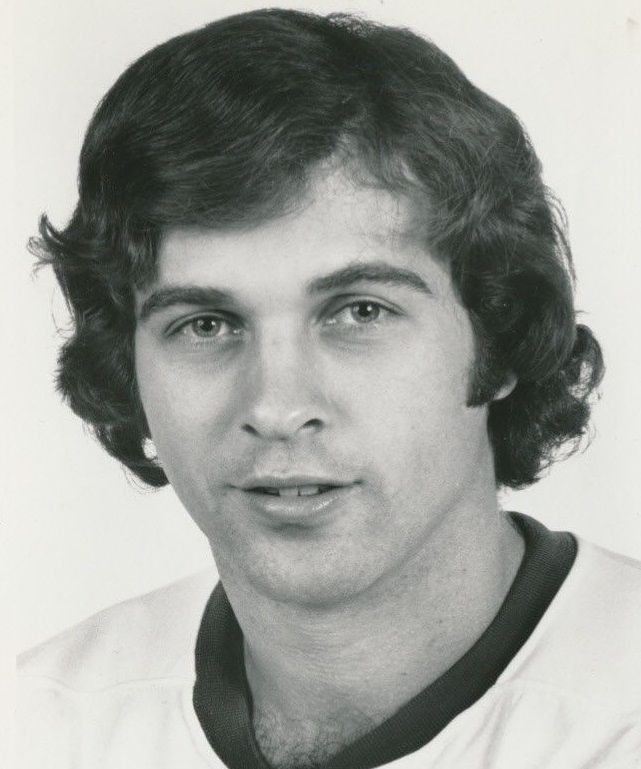
- Harris in 1973
- Born: January 29, 1952 (age 74) Toronto, Ontario, Canada
- Height: 6 ft 0 in (183 cm)
- Weight: 197 lb (89 kg; 14 st 1 lb)
- Position: Right wing
- Shot: Left
- Played for: New York Islanders; Los Angeles Kings; Toronto Maple Leafs
- NHL draft: 1st overall, 1972; New York Islanders
- Playing career: 1972–1984

William Edward Harris (born January 29, 1952) is a Canadian former professional ice hockey player in the National Hockey League who played from 1972 to 1984. He helped the New York Islanders reach the NHL playoff semi-finals four times in five seasons from 1975 to 1979.

== Playing career ==
As a youth, Harris played in the 1964 Quebec International Pee-Wee Hockey Tournament with the Toronto Shopsy's minor ice hockey team.

Harris was drafted first overall in the 1972 NHL Amateur Draft by the expansion New York Islanders. He is known for being the first New York Islander. He played on Long Island until he was traded to the Los Angeles Kings on March 10, 1980, along with Dave Lewis for Butch Goring. Later that year, the Islanders won their first Stanley Cup of four in a row. Harris was never part of a winning Cup team, but he is remembered for helping the Islanders grow from their initial days as an expansion franchise to a dominant team in the late 1970s and early 1980s. Harris played more than 500 consecutive games for the Islanders before he was traded. He finished off the last few seasons of his career with the Los Angeles Kings and Toronto Maple Leafs before retiring after the 1983–84 season.

== Career statistics ==
			Regular season					Playoffs
Season	Team	League	GP	G	A	Pts	PIM	GP	G	A	Pts	PIM
1968–69	Toronto Marlboros	OHA-Jr.	41	9	18	27	14	6	2	2	4	—
1969–70	Toronto Marlboros	OHA-Jr.	46	13	17	30	75	18	4	9	13	26
1970–71	Toronto Marlboros	OHA-Jr.	48	34	48	82	61	13	8	9	17	14
1971–72	Toronto Marlboros	OHA-Jr.	63	57	72	129	87	10	13	10	23	26
1972–73	New York Islanders	NHL	78	28	22	50	35	—	—	—	—	—
1973–74	New York Islanders	NHL	78	23	27	50	34	—	—	—	—	—
1974–75	New York Islanders	NHL	80	25	37	62	34	17	3	7	10	12
1975–76	New York Islanders	NHL	80	32	38	70	54	13	5	2	7	10
1976–77	New York Islanders	NHL	80	24	43	67	44	12	7	7	14	8
1977–78	New York Islanders	NHL	80	22	38	60	40	7	0	0	0	4
1978–79	New York Islanders	NHL	80	15	39	54	18	10	2	1	3	10
1979–80	New York Islanders	NHL	67	15	15	30	37	—	—	—	—	—
1979–80	Los Angeles Kings	NHL	11	4	3	7	6	4	0	0	0	2
1980–81	Los Angeles Kings	NHL	80	20	29	49	36	4	2	1	3	0
1981–82	Los Angeles Kings	NHL	16	1	3	4	6	—	—	—	—	—
1981–82	Toronto Maple Leafs	NHL	20	2	0	2	4	—	—	—	—	—
1982–83	Toronto Maple Leafs	NHL	76	11	19	30	26	4	0	1	1	2
1983–84	St. Catharines Saints	AHL	2	0	1	1	0	—	—	—	—	—
1983–84	Toronto Maple Leafs	NHL	50	7	10	17	14	—	—	—	—	—
1983–84	Los Angeles Kings	NHL	21	2	4	6	6	—	—	—	—	—
NHL totals			897	231	327	558	394	71	19	19	38	48

Preceded by Guy Lafleur	NHL first overall draft pick 1972	Succeeded by Denis Potvin
Preceded by None	New York Islanders first-round draft pick 1972	Succeeded by Denis Potvin
