= D'Arcy Keating =

- Born: December 12, 1952 (age 73) Oshawa, Ontario, Canada
- Height: 6 ft 0 in (183 cm)
- Weight: 210 lb (95 kg; 15 st 0 lb)
- Position: Right wing
- Shot: Right
- Played for: IHL; Fort Wayne Komets; Milwaukee Admirals
- NHL draft: 104th overall, 1972; Pittsburgh Penguins
- Playing career: 1973–1979

John D'Arcy Keating (born December 12, 1952) is a Canadian former professional ice hockey player. He was selected by the Pittsburgh Penguins in the seventh round (104th overall) of the 1972 NHL Amateur Draft.

== Hockey career ==
Keating played junior hockey with the Sault Ste. Marie Greyhounds, and attended the University of Notre Dame where he played NCAA Division I hockey with the Notre Dame Fighting Irish.

Keating began his professional career in the International Hockey League (IHL) with the Fort Wayne Komets, playing 28 regular-season games and 5 playoff contests during the 1972–73 season. He went on to play six seasons and 332 games in the IHL, scoring 101 goals and 150 assists for 251 points, while earning 235 penalty minutes. Keating was selected to play in the 1978 IHL All-Star Game, where he scored two goals.

== Later life ==
Following his playing career, Keating became a police officer. He was part of the police security at the 2010 Winter Olympics in Vancouver.

== Career statistics ==
| | | | Regular season | | | | | Playoffs |
| Season | Team | League | GP | G | A | Pts | PIM | GP | G | A | Pts | PIM |
|---|---|---|---|---|---|---|---|---|---|---|---|---|
| 1970–71 | Sault Ste. Marie Greyhounds | NOJHL | — | 22 | 43 | 65 | 130 | — | — | — | — | — |
| 1971–72 | University of Notre Dame | NCAA | 15 | 7 | 9 | 16 | 4 | — | — | — | — | — |
| 1972–73 | University of Notre Dame | NCAA | 12 | 0 | 1 | 1 | 18 | — | — | — | — | — |
| 1972–73 | Fort Wayne Komets | IHL | 28 | 7 | 4 | 11 | 24 | 5 | 2 | 3 | 5 | 2 |
| 1973–74 | Fort Wayne Komets | IHL | 73 | 17 | 36 | 53 | 34 | — | — | — | — | — |
| 1974–75 | Central Wisconsin Flyers | USHL Sr. | 20 | 12 | 13 | 25 | 9 | — | — | — | — | — |
| 1975–76 | Fort Wayne Komets | IHL | 63 | 26 | 41 | 67 | 87 | 9 | 3 | 3 | 6 | 4 |
| 1975–76 | Central Wisconsin Flyers | USHL Sr. | 9 | 7 | 16 | 23 | 7 | — | — | — | — | — |
| 1976–77 | Fort Wayne Komets | IHL | 77 | 22 | 41 | 63 | 24 | 9 | 3 | 4 | 7 | 14 |
| 1977–78 | Fort Wayne Komets | IHL | 79 | 27 | 26 | 53 | 55 | 11 | 5 | 0 | 5 | 27 |
| 1978–79 | Fort Wayne Komets | IHL | 6 | 0 | 2 | 2 | 7 | — | — | — | — | — |
| 1978–79 | Milwaukee Admirals | IHL | 6 | 2 | 0 | 2 | 4 | — | — | — | — | — |
| IHL totals | | | 332 | 101 | 150 | 251 | 235 | 34 | 13 | 10 | 23 | 47 |
