= Brian Walker (ice hockey) =

Canadian ice hockey player

- Born: May 4, 1952 (age 73) Beaverlodge, Alberta, Canada
- Height: 5 ft 10 in (178 cm)
- Weight: 180 lb (82 kg; 12 st 12 lb)
- Position: Centre
- Shot: Right
- Played for: Hershey Bears (AHL); Fort Wayne Komets (IHL); Kramfors-Alliansen (Sweden)
- NHL draft: 72nd overall, 1972; Pittsburgh Penguins
- Playing career: 1972–1977

Brian Walker (born May 4, 1952) is a Canadian former professional ice hockey player. He was selected by the Pittsburgh Penguins in the fifth round (72nd overall) of the 1972 NHL Amateur Draft. Walker played major junior hockey with the Calgary Centennials of the Western Hockey League.

== Career ==
Drafted by the Pittsburgh Penguins in the 1972 NHL Amateur Draft, Walker played professionally, mostly with the Fort Wayne Komets of the International Hockey League, but also with the Hershey Bears of the American Hockey League. He also played the 1975–76 season in Sweden with Kramfors-Alliansen. Walker helped the Komets to capture the 1973 Turner Cup, but in June 1973, he was struck by a hit-and-run driver and suffered a fractured hip which caused him to miss the entire 1973–74 season, returning to play with the 1974–75 season. Walker retired following the 1976–77 season.
