= Jerry Byers =

Canadian ice hockey player (1952–2006)

- Born: March 29, 1952 Kentville, Nova Scotia, Canada
- Died: December 25, 2006 (aged 54) Bridgewater, Nova Scotia
- Height: 5 ft 11 in (180 cm)
- Weight: 170 lb (77 kg; 12 st 2 lb)
- Position: Left wing
- Shot: Left
- Played for: Minnesota North Stars; Atlanta Flames; New York Rangers
- NHL draft: 12th overall, 1972; Minnesota North Stars
- Playing career: 1972–1981

Jerry William Byers (March 29, 1952 – December 25, 2006) was a Canadian professional ice hockey forward.

== Career ==
Byers was drafted in the first round, twelfth overall, by the Minnesota North Stars in the 1972 NHL Amateur Draft. He played forty-five games in the National Hockey League: twenty-four with the North Stars in the 1972–73 and 1973–74 seasons, fourteen with the Atlanta Flames in the 1974–75 season, and seven with the New York Rangers in the 1977–78 season. He left North America in 1980 to join HC Salzburg in the Austrian Hockey League. He then spent two seasons in Switzerland's National League B for EHC Grindelwald before finishing his career in the Japan Ice Hockey League for Jūjō Ice Hockey Club.

As a youth, he played in the 1963 and 1964 Quebec International Pee-Wee Hockey Tournaments with his Kentville minor ice hockey team.

== Career statistics ==
=== Regular season and playoffs ===
			Regular season					Playoffs
Season	Team	League	GP	G	A	Pts	PIM	GP	G	A	Pts	PIM
1969–70	Kitchener Rangers	OHA	36	18	24	42	8	—	—	—	—	—
1970–71	Kitchener Rangers	OHA	62	41	39	80	46	—	—	—	—	—
1971–72	Kitchener Rangers	OHA	60	41	60	101	49	—	—	—	—	—
1972–73	Cleveland/Jacksonville Barons	AHL	59	20	17	37	12	—	—	—	—	—
1972–73	Minnesota North Stars	NHL	14	0	2	2	6	—	—	—	—	—
1973–74	New Haven Nighthawks	AHL	62	31	47	78	37	10	4	6	10	4
1973–74	Minnesota North Stars	NHL	10	0	0	0	0	—	—	—	—	—
1974–75	Omaha Knights	CHL	38	21	31	52	29	6	9	2	11	2
1974–75	Atlanta Flames	NHL	14	1	1	2	9	—	—	—	—	—
1975–76	Providence Reds	AHL	74	27	34	61	28	3	0	2	2	2
1976–77	New Haven Nighthawks	AHL	77	31	34	65	18	6	1	3	4	0
1977–78	New Haven Nighthawks	AHL	74	32	31	63	13	15	7	3	10	4
1977–78	New York Rangers	NHL	7	2	1	3	0	—	—	—	—	—
1978–79	Nova Scotia Voyageurs	AHL	78	33	42	75	28	10	0	5	5	4
1979–80	Nova Scotia Voyageurs	AHL	74	23	36	59	16	6	1	2	3	2
1980–81	HC Salzburg	Austria	23	20	15	35	27	—	—	—	—	—
1981–82	EHC Grindelwald	NLB	38	38	18	56	—	—	—	—	—	—
1982–83	EHC Grindelwald	NLB	38	38	14	52	—	—	—	—	—	—
1983–84	Jūjō Ice Hockey Club	JIHL	30	25	14	39	—	—	—	—	—	—
AHL totals			498	197	241	438	152	50	13	21	34	16
NHL totals			45	3	4	7	15	—	—	—	—	—

Preceded by Dick Redmond	Minnesota North Stars first-round draft pick 1972	Succeeded by Doug Hicks
