= Terry Ryan (ice hockey, born 1952) =

Canadian ice hockey player

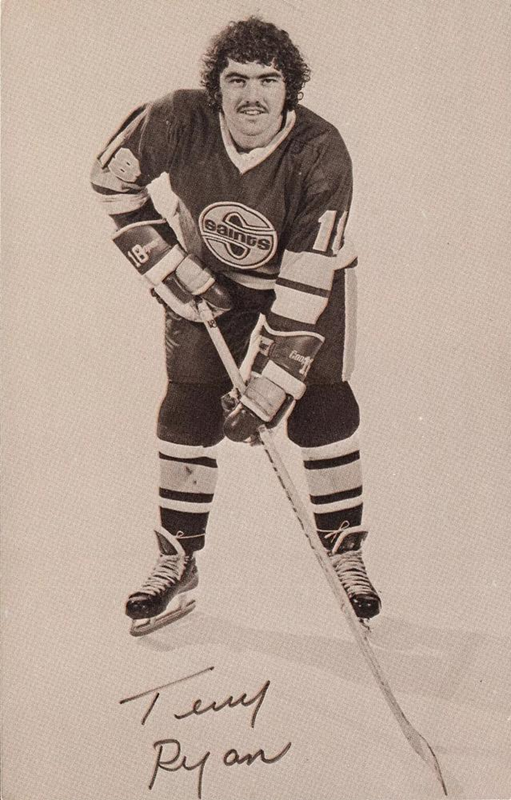
- Ryan in 1972 photo
- Born: September 10, 1952 (age 73) Grand Falls, Newfoundland, Canada
- Height: 5 ft 10 in (178 cm)
- Weight: 178 lb (81 kg; 12 st 10 lb)
- Position: Centre
- Shot: Left
- Played for: Minnesota Fighting Saints
- NHL draft: 44th overall, 1972; Minnesota North Stars
- Playing career: 1972–1973

Terrence Clinton John Ryan (born September 10, 1952) is a Canadian former professional ice hockey centre who played 76 games in the World Hockey Association for the Minnesota Fighting Saints.

== Career statistics ==
| | | | Regular season | | | | | Playoffs |
| Season | Team | League | GP | G | A | Pts | PIM | GP | G | A | Pts | PIM |
|---|---|---|---|---|---|---|---|---|---|---|---|---|
| 1969–70 | Hamilton Red Wings | OHA | 54 | 23 | 28 | 51 | 20 | — | — | — | — | — |
| 1970–71 | Hamilton Red Wings | OHA | 56 | 22 | 38 | 60 | 42 | — | — | — | — | — |
| 1971–72 | Hamilton Red Wings | OHA | 61 | 47 | 45 | 92 | 59 | — | — | — | — | — |
| 1972–73 | Minnesota Fighting Saints | WHA | 76 | 13 | 6 | 19 | 13 | 6 | 0 | 2 | 2 | 0 |
| 1973–74 | Winston-Salem Polar Twins | SHL | 23 | 7 | 20 | 27 | 13 | 7 | 2 | 2 | 4 | 0 |
| 1973–74 | Suncoast Suns | SHL | 29 | 17 | 21 | 38 | 30 | — | — | — | — | — |
| 1974–75 | Lansing Lancers | IHL | 41 | 19 | 37 | 56 | 13 | — | — | — | — | — |
| 1974–75 | Muskegon Mohawks | IHL | 31 | 15 | 30 | 45 | 9 | 12 | 4 | 6 | 10 | 9 |
| 1975–76 | Kalamazoo Wings | IHL | 41 | 14 | 33 | 47 | 8 | 6 | 3 | 2 | 5 | 26 |
| 1977–78 | Kalamazoo Wings | IHL | 59 | 19 | 36 | 55 | 50 | 8 | 2 | 7 | 9 | 26 |
| WHA totals | | | 76 | 13 | 6 | 19 | 13 | 6 | 0 | 2 | 2 | 0 |
