= Chris Meloff =

Canadian ice hockey player

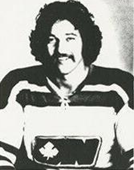
- Meloff in 1972 photo
- Born: May 7, 1952 (age 74) Toronto, Ontario, Canada
- Height: 5 ft 9 in (175 cm)
- Weight: 169 lb (77 kg; 12 st 1 lb)
- Position: Defence
- Shot: Left
- Played for: Ottawa Nationals
- NHL draft: 108th overall, 1972; Minnesota North Stars
- Playing career: 1972–1975

Christopher D. "Chris" Meloff (born May 7, 1952) is a Canadian former professional ice hockey player who played in the World Hockey Association (WHA). Drafted in the seventh round of the 1972 NHL Amateur Draft by the Minnesota North Stars, Meloff opted to play in the WHA after being selected by the Ottawa Nationals in the WHA General Player Draft. He played the 1972–73 WHA season with the Nationals.

== Career statistics ==
=== Regular season and playoffs ===
			Regular season					Playoffs
Season	Team	League	GP	G	A	Pts	PIM	GP	G	A	Pts	PIM
1968–69	Markham Seal-A-Wax	MJBHL	Statistics Unavailable
1969–70	Peterborough Petes	OHA	52	10	35	45	112	—	—	—	—	—
1970–71	Toronto Marlboros	OHA	34	3	20	23	98	—	—	—	—	—
1970–71	Kitchener Rangers	OHA	33	5	19	24	72	—	—	—	—	—
1971–72	Kitchener Rangers	OHA	59	4	37	41	83	—	—	—	—	—
1972–73	Ottawa Nationals	WHA	28	1	6	7	40	—	—	—	—	—
1973–74	Jacksonville Barons	AHL	31	0	5	5	61	—	—	—	—	—
1973–74	Mohawk Valley Comets	NAHL	17	1	6	7	13	—	—	—	—	—
1974–75	Mohawk Valley Comets	NAHL	69	6	23	29	123	4	0	0	0	0
WHA totals			28	1	6	7	40	—	—	—	—	—
