= Yves Bergeron =

Canadian ice hockey player (born 1952)

- Born: January 11, 1952 (age 74) Malartic, Quebec, Canada
- Height: 5 ft 9 in (175 cm)
- Weight: 165 lb (75 kg; 11 st 11 lb)
- Position: Right Wing
- Shot: Right
- Played for: Pittsburgh Penguins
- NHL draft: 120th overall, 1972; Pittsburgh Penguins
- Playing career: 1972–1977

Yves Bergeron (born January 11, 1952) is a Canadian former professional ice hockey right winger. He played 65 games in the World Hockey Association for the Quebec Nordiques during the 1972–73 season and 3 games in the National Hockey League for the Pittsburgh Penguins during the 1974–75 and 1976–77 seasons. The rest of his career, which lasted from 1972 to 1985, was spent in the minor leagues.

Bergeron was born in Malartic, Quebec. As a youth, he played in the 1964 Quebec International Pee-Wee Hockey Tournament with a minor ice hockey team from Amos, Quebec.

== Career statistics ==
=== Regular season and playoffs ===
			Regular season					Playoffs
Season	Team	League	GP	G	A	Pts	PIM	GP	G	A	Pts	PIM
1967–68	Malartic Bruins	QNWJHL	29	15	28	43	133	—	—	—	—	—
1969–70	Shawinigan Bruins	QMJHL	52	36	43	79	131	5	0	5	5	2
1970–71	Shawinigan Bruins	QMJHL	62	35	54	89	87	15	3	14	17	6
1971–72	Shawinigan Bruins	QMJHL	57	31	60	91	54	9	1	3	4	15
1972–73	Quebec Nordiques	WHA	65	14	19	33	32	—	—	—	—	—
1973–74	Maine Nordiques	NAHL	73	27	51	78	54	8	2	1	3	11
1974–75	Hershey Bears	AHL	67	31	28	59	116	12	4	9	13	46
1974–75	Pittsburgh Penguins	NHL	2	0	0	0	0	—	—	—	—	—
1975–76	Hershey Bears	AHL	67	26	23	49	87	10	2	4	6	14
1976–77	Pittsburgh Penguins	NHL	1	0	0	0	0	—	—	—	—	—
1976–77	Hershey Bears	AHL	72	23	27	50	90	6	1	1	2	0
1978–79	Bathurst Alpines	NNBSL	—	—	—	—	—	4	1	3	4	51
1979–80	Bathurst Alpines	NNBSL	—	—	—	—	—	5	1	2	3	30
1980–81	Bathurst Alpines	NNBSL	—	—	—	—	—	8	1	2	3	19
1981–82	Bathurst Alpines	NNBSL	—	—	—	—	—	11	4	8	12	24
1982–83	Bathurst Alpines	NNBSL	26	14	15	29	92	7	2	3	5	10
1983–84	Bathurst Alpines	NNBSL	19	6	6	12	40	5	3	1	4	6
1984–85	Bathurst Alpines	NNBSL	—	—	—	—	—	4	0	2	2	4
WHA totals			65	14	19	33	32	—	—	—	—	—
NHL totals			3	0	0	0	0	—	—	—	—	—
