= 1972 NHL amateur draft =

1972 North American ice hockey draft

General information
- Date: June 8, 1972
- Location: Queen Elizabeth Hotel; Montreal, Quebec, Canada

Overview
- 152 total selections in 11 rounds
- First selection: (Canada) Billy Harris (New York Islanders)
- Hall of Famers: 2: LW Steve Shutt; LW Bill Barber

The 1972 NHL amateur draft was the 10th draft for the National Hockey League. It was held at the Queen Elizabeth Hotel in Montreal.

The last active player in the NHL from this draft class was Richard Brodeur, who played his last NHL game in the 1987–88 season.

== Selections by round ==
Below are listed the selections in the 1972 NHL amateur draft. The expansion Islanders won the first pick by a coin toss between themselves and the Flames.

= NHL All-Star team ·	= NHL All-Star (Note: Players are identified as an All-Star if they were selected for the All-Star game at any time in their career.) ·	= NHL All-Star and NHL All-Star team ·	= Hall of Famers

=== Round one ===
#	Player	Nationality	NHL team	College/junior/club team
1	Billy Harris (RW)	Canada	New York Islanders	Toronto Marlboros (OHL)
2	Jacques Richard (LW)	Canada	Atlanta Flames	Quebec Remparts (QMJHL)
3	Don Lever (C)	Canada	Vancouver Canucks	Niagara Falls Flyers (OMJHL)
4	Steve Shutt (LW)	Canada	Montreal Canadiens (from Los Angeles)^{1}	Toronto Marlboros (OMJHL)
5	Jim Schoenfeld (D)	Canada	Buffalo Sabres	Niagara Falls Flyers (OMJHL)
6	Michel Larocque (G)	Canada	Montreal Canadiens (from California)^{2}	Ottawa 67's (OMJHL)
7	Bill Barber (LW)	Canada	Philadelphia Flyers	Kitchener Rangers (OMJHL)
8	Dave Gardner (C)	Canada	Montreal Canadiens (from Minnesota via Pittsburgh)^{3}	Toronto Marlboros (OMJHL)
9	Wayne Merrick (C)	Canada	St. Louis Blues	Ottawa 67's (OMJHL)
10	Al Blanchard (LW)	Canada	New York Rangers (from Detroit)^{4}	Kitchener Rangers (OMJHL)
11	George Ferguson (C)	Canada	Toronto Maple Leafs	Toronto Marlboros (OMJHL)
12	Jerry Byers (LW)	Canada	Minnesota North Stars	Kitchener Rangers (OMJHL)
13	Phil Russell (D)	Canada	Chicago Black Hawks	Edmonton Oil Kings (WCHL)
14	John Van Boxmeer (D)	Canada	Montreal Canadiens	Guelph CMC's (SOJHL)
15	Bob MacMillan (C)	Canada	New York Rangers	St. Catharines Black Hawks (OMJHL)
16	Mike Bloom (LW)	Canada	Boston Bruins	St. Catharines Black Hawks (OMJHL)
^{Reference: "1972 NHL Amateur Draft hockeydraftcentral.com". Archived from the original on January 22, 2009.}

1. The Los Angeles Kings' first-round pick went to the Montreal Canadiens as the result of a trade on June 11, 1968, that sent Gerry Desjardins to Los Angeles in exchange for Los Angeles' 1969 first-round pick (Dick Redmond) and this pick.
  In June 1969, the Montreal Canadiens' traded the 1969 first-round pick to the Minnesota North Stars in exchange for Minnesota's promised to Montreal that they would not draft Dick Duff in the 1969 intra-league draft.
2. The California Golden Seals' first-round pick went to the Montreal Canadiens as the result of a trade on June 10, 1968, that sent Bryan Watson and cash to California in exchange for future considerations (Tom Thurlby trade completed in September 1968) and this pick.
3. The Minnesota North Stars' first-round pick went to the Montreal Canadiens as the result of a trade on June 10, 1968, that sent Minnesota's first-round pick in 1972, cash and future considerations (Marshall Johnston trade completed on May 25, 1971) to Montreal in exchange for Danny Grant, Claude Larose and future considerations (Bob Murdoch trade completed on May 25, 1971).
  The Pittsburgh Penguins' first-round pick went to the Minnesota North Stars as the result of a trade on October 1, 1968, that sent Pittsburgh's first-round pick in 1972 to Minnesota in exchange for Bob Woytowich.
  The Montreal Canadiens received the lowest of Minnesota's two first-round pick.
4. The Detroit Red Wings' first-round pick went to the New York Rangers as the result of a trade on May 24, 1972, that sent Gary Doak and Rick Newell to Detroit in exchange for Joe Zanussi and this pick.

=== Round two ===
#	Player	Nationality	NHL team	College/junior/club team
17	Lorne Henning (C)	Canada	New York Islanders	New Westminster Bruins (WCHL)
18	Dwight Bialowas (D)	Canada	Atlanta Flames	Regina Pats (WCHL)
19	Bryan McSheffrey (RW)	Canada	Vancouver Canucks	Ottawa 67's OMJHL)
20	Don Kozak (RW)	Canada	Los Angeles Kings	Edmonton Oil Kings (WCHL)
21	Larry Sacharuk (D)	Canada	New York Rangers (from Buffalo)^{1}	Saskatoon Blades (WCHL)
22	Tom Cassidy (C)	Canada	California Golden Seals	Kitchener Rangers (OMJHL)
23	Tom Bladon (D)	Canada	Philadelphia Flyers	Edmonton Oil Kings (WCHL)
24	Jack Lynch (D)	Canada	Pittsburgh Penguins	Oshawa Generals (OMJHL)
25	Larry Carriere (D)	Canada	Buffalo Sabres (from St. Louis)^{2}	Loyola College (CIAU)
26	Pierre Guite (LW)	Canada	Detroit Red Wings	University of Pennsylvania (ECAC)
27	Randy Osburn (LW)	Canada	Toronto Maple Leafs	London Knights (OMJHL)
28	Stan Weir (C)	Canada	California Golden Seals (from Montreal via Minnesota)^{3}	Medicine Hat Tigers (WCHL)
29	Brian Ogilvie (C)	Canada	Chicago Black Hawks	Edmonton Oil Kings (WCHL)
30	Bernie Lukowich (RW)	Canada	Pittsburgh Penguins (from St. Louis)^{4}	New Westminster Bruins (WCHL)
31	Rene Villemure (LW)	Canada	New York Rangers	Shawinigan Dynamos (QMJHL)
32	Wayne Elder (D)	Canada	Boston Bruins	London Knights (OMJHL)
^{Reference: "1972 NHL Amateur Draft hockeydraftcentral.com".}

1. The Buffalo Sabres' second-round pick went to the New York Rangers as the result of a trade on January 14, 1972, that sent Jim Lorentz to Buffalo in exchange for this pick.
2. The St. Louis Blues' second-round pick went to the Buffalo Sabres as the result of a trade on March 5, 1972, that sent Chris Evans to St. Louis in exchange for George Morrison and this pick.
3. The Montreal Canadiens' second-round pick went to the California Golden Seals as the result of a trade on June 8, 1972, that sent Montreal's second-round pick in 1972 to California in exchange for California's first-round and second-round picks in 1973 as settlement of waiver draft payment owed from California to Montreal for California selecting Carol Vadnais in the 1968 intra-league draft.
  Montreal previously acquired this pick as the result of a trade on May 24, 1971, that sent Montreal's first-round pick in 1972, Gary Gambucci and Bob Paradise to Minnesota in exchange for Minnesota's first-round pick in 1972, second-round pick in 1972 and cash.
  The original trade between Montreal and California was on June 12, 1968, that sent California's first-round and second-round picks in 1973 to Montreal in exchange for the opportunity to select Carol Vadnais in the 1968 intra-league draft.
4. The St. Louis Blues' second-round pick went to the Pittsburgh Penguins as the result of a trade on June 6, 1969, that sent Lou Angotti and Pittsburgh's first-round pick in 1971 to St. Louis (St. Louis selected Gene Carr) in exchange for Craig Cameron, Ron Schock and this pick.

=== Round three ===
#	Player	Nationality	NHL team	College/junior/club team
33	Bob Nystrom (RW)	Canada	New York Islanders	Calgary Centennials (WCHL)
34	Jean Lemieux (D)	Canada	Atlanta Flames	Sherbrooke Castors (QMJHL)
35	Paul Raymer (LW)	Canada	Vancouver Canucks	Peterborough Petes (OMJHL)
36	Dave Hutchison (D)	Canada	Los Angeles Kings	London Knights (OMJHL)
37	Jim McMasters (D)	Canada	Buffalo Sabres	Calgary Centennials (WCHL)
38	Paul Shakes (D)	Canada	California Golden Seals	St. Catharines Black Hawks (OMJHL)
39	Jim Watson (D)	Canada	Philadelphia Flyers	Calgary Centennials (WCHL)
40	Denis Herron (G)	Canada	Pittsburgh Penguins	Trois-Rivières Draveurs (QMJHL)
41	Jean Hamel (D)	Canada	St. Louis Blues	Drummondville Rangers (QMJHL)
42	Bob Krieger (C)	United States	Detroit Red Wings	University of Denver (WCHA)
43	Denis Deslauriers (D)	Canada	Toronto Maple Leafs	Shawinigan Dynamos (QMJHL)
44	Terry Ryan (C)	Canada	Minnesota North Stars	Hamilton Red Wings (OMJHL)
45	Mike Veisor (G)	Canada	Chicago Black Hawks	Peterborough Petes (OMJHL)
46	Ed Gilbert (C)	Canada	Montreal Canadiens	Hamilton Red Wings (OMJHL)
47	Gerry Teeple (C)	Canada	New York Rangers	Cornwall Royals (QMJHL)
48	Michel Boudreau (C)	Canada	Boston Bruins	Laval National (QMJHL)
^{Reference: "1972 NHL Amateur Draft hockeydraftcentral.com".}

=== Round four ===
#	Player	Nationality	NHL team	College/junior/club team
49	Ron Smith (D)	Canada	New York Islanders	Cornwall Royals (QMJHL)
50	Don Martineau (RW)	Canada	Atlanta Flames	New Westminster Bruins (WCHL)
51	Ron Homenuke (RW)	Canada	Vancouver Canucks	Calgary Centennials (WCHL)
52	John Dobie (D)	Canada	Los Angeles Kings	Regina Pats (WCHL)
53	Rychard Campeau (D)	Canada	Buffalo Sabres	Sorel Eperviers (QMJHL)
54	Claude St. Sauveur (LW)	Canada	California Golden Seals	Sherbrooke Castors (QMJHL)
55	Al MacAdam (RW)	Canada	Philadelphia Flyers	Charlottetown Royals (MaJHL)
56	Ron Lalonde (C)	Canada	Pittsburgh Penguins	Peterborough Petes (OMJHL)
57	Murray Myers (RW)	Canada	St. Louis Blues	Saskatoon Blades (WCHL)
58	Danny Gruen (LW)	Canada	Detroit Red Wings	Thunder Bay Vulcans (TBJHL)
59	Brian Bowles (D)	Canada	Toronto Maple Leafs	Cornwall Royals (QMJHL)
60	Tom Thomson (D)	Canada	Minnesota North Stars	Toronto Marlboros (OMJHL)
61	Tom Peluso (RW)	United States	Chicago Black Hawks	University of Denver (WCHA)
62	Dave Elenbaas (G)	Canada	Montreal Canadiens	Cornell University (ECAC)
63	Doug Horbul (LW)	Canada	New York Rangers	Calgary Centennials (WCHL)
64	Les Jackson (LW)	Canada	Boston Bruins	New Westminster Bruins (WCHL)
^{Reference: "1972 NHL Amateur Draft hockeydraftcentral.com".}

=== Round five ===
#	Player	Nationality	NHL team	College/junior/club team
65	Richard Grenier (C)	Canada	New York Islanders	Verdun Eperviers (QMJHL)
66	Bill Nyrop (D)	United States	Montreal Canadiens (from Atlanta)^{1}	University of Notre Dame (WCHA)
67	Larry Bolonchuk (D)	Canada	Vancouver Canucks	Winnipeg Jets (WCHL)
68	Bernie Germain (G)	Canada	Los Angeles Kings	Regina Pats (WCHL)
69	Gilles Gratton (G)	Canada	Buffalo Sabres	Oshawa Generals (OMJHL)
70	Tim Jacobs (D)	Canada	California Golden Seals	St. Catharines Black Hawks (OMJHL)
71	Daryl Fedorak (G)	Canada	Philadelphia Flyers	Victoria Cougars (WCHL)
72	Brian Walker (C)	Canada	Pittsburgh Penguins	Calgary Centennials (WCHL)
73	Dave Johnson (LW)	Canada	St. Louis Blues	Cornwall Royals (QMJHL)
74	Dennis Johnson (LW)	United States	Detroit Red Wings	University of North Dakota (WCHA)
75	Michel Plante (LW)	Canada	Toronto Maple Leafs	Drummondville Rangers (QMJHL)
76	Chris Ahrens (D)	United States	Minnesota North Stars	Kitchener Rangers (OMJHL)
77	Rejean Giroux (RW)	Canada	Chicago Black Hawks	Quebec Remparts (QMJHL)
78	Jean-Paul Martin (C)	Canada	Atlanta Flames (from Montreal)^{2}	Shawinigan Dynamos (QMJHL)
79	Marty Gateman (D)	Canada	New York Rangers	Hamilton Red Wings (OMJHL)
80	Brian Coates (LW)	Canada	Boston Bruins	Brandon Wheat Kings (WCHL)
^{Reference: "1972 NHL Amateur Draft hockeydraftcentral.com".}

1. The Atlanta Flames' fifth-round pick went to the Montreal Canadiens as the result of a trade on June 7, 1972, that sent Ted Tucker and Montreal's fifth-round pick in 1972 to Atlanta in exchange for cash and this pick. Ted Tucker and Montreal's fifth-round pick in 1973.
2. The Montreal Canadiens' fifth-round pick went to the Atlanta Flames as the result of a trade on June 7, 1972, that sent the Atlanta's fifth-round pick in 1972 (Bill Nyrop) and cash to Montreal in exchange for Ted Tucker and this pick.

=== Round six ===
#	Player	Nationality	NHL team	College/junior/club team
81	Derek Black (LW)	Canada	New York Islanders	Calgary Centennials (WCHL)
82	Frank Blum (G)	Canada	Atlanta Flames	Sarnia Legionnaires (WOJHL)
83	Dave McLelland (G)	Canada	Vancouver Canucks	Brandon Wheat Kings (WCHL)
84	Mike Usitalo (LW)	United States	Los Angeles Kings	Michigan Technological University (WCHA)
85	Peter McNab (C)	Canada/ United States	Buffalo Sabres	University of Denver (WCHA)
86	Jacques Lefebvre (G)	Canada	California Golden Seals	Shawnigan Dynamos (QMJHL)
87	David Hasting (G)	Canada	Philadelphia Flyers	Charlottetown Royals (MaJHL)
88	Jeff Ablett (LW)	Canada	Pittsburgh Penguins	Medicine Hat Tigers (WCHL)
89	Tom Simpson (RW)	Canada	St. Louis Blues	Oshawa Generals (OMJHL)
90	Bill Miller (D)	Canada	Detroit Red Wings	Medicine Hat Tigers (WCHL)
91	Dave Shardlow (LW)	Canada	Toronto Maple Leafs	Flin Flon Bombers (WCHL)
92	Steve West (C)	Canada	Minnesota North Stars	Oshawa Generals (OMJHL)
93	Rob Palmer (C)	United States	Chicago Black Hawks	University of Denver (WCHA)
94	D'Arcy Ryan (C)	Canada	Montreal Canadiens	Yale University (ECAC)
95	Ken Ireland (C)	Canada	New York Rangers	New Westminster Bruins (WCHL)
96	Peter Gaw (RW)	Canada	Boston Bruins	Ottawa 67's (OMJHL)
^{Reference: "1972 NHL Amateur Draft hockeydraftcentral.com".}

=== Round seven ===
#	Player	Nationality	NHL team	College/junior/club team
97	Richard Brodeur (G)	Canada	New York Islanders	Cornwall Royals (QMJHL)
98	Scott Smith (LW)	Canada	Atlanta Flames	Regina Pats (WCHL)
99	Danny Gloor (C)	Canada	Vancouver Canucks	Peterborough Petes (OMJHL)
100	Glen Toner (LW)	Canada	Los Angeles Kings	Regina Pats (WCHL)
101	Don McLaughlin (LW)	Canada	New York Islanders (from Buffalo)^{1}	Brandon Wheat Kings (WCHL)
102	Mike Amodeo (D)	Canada	California Golden Seals	Oshawa Generals (OMJHL)
103	Serge Beaudoin (D)	Canada	Philadelphia Flyers	Trois-Rivières Draveurs (QMJHL)
104	D'Arcy Keating (D)	Canada	Pittsburgh Penguins	University of Notre Dame (WCHA)
105	Brian Coughlin (D)	Canada	St. Louis Blues	Verdun Maple Leafs (QMJHL)
106	Glen Seperich (G)	Canada	Detroit Red Wings	Kitchener Rangers (OMJHL)
107	Monte Miron (D)	Canada	Toronto Maple Leafs	Clarkson University (ECAC)
108	Chris Meloff (D)	Canada	Minnesota North Stars	Kitchener Rangers (OMJHL)
109	Terry Smith (C)	Canada	Chicago Black Hawks	Edmonton Oil Kings (WCHL)
110	Yves Archambault (G)	Canada	Montreal Canadiens	Sorel Éperviers (QMJHL)
111	Jeff Hunt (LW)	Canada	New York Rangers	Winnipeg Jets (WCHL)
112	Gordie Clark (RW)	Canada	Boston Bruins	University of New Hampshire (ECAC)
^{Reference: "1972 NHL Amateur Draft hockeydraftcentral.com".}

1. The Buffalo Sabres' seventh-round pick went to the New York Islanders as the result of a trade on June 6, 1972, that the Islanders' promised to not take certain players in the 1972 NHL expansion draft in exchange for Buffalo's eight-round, ninth-round, tenth-round picks in the 1972 NHL Amateur Draft and this pick.

=== Round eight ===
#	Player	Nationality	NHL team	College/junior/club team
113	Derek Kuntz (LW)	Canada	New York Islanders	Medicine Hat Tigers (WCHL)
114	Dave Murphy (C)	Canada	Atlanta Flames	Hamilton Red Wings (OMJHL)
115	Dennis McCord (D)	Canada	Vancouver Canucks	London Knights (OMJHL)
116	Scott MacPhail (RW)	Canada	Minnesota North Stars (from Los Angeles)^{1}	Montreal Junior Canadiens (OMJHL)
117	Rene Levasseur (D)	Canada	New York Islanders (from Buffalo)^{2}	Shawinigan Dynamos (QMJHL)
118	Brent Meeke (D)	Canada	California Golden Seals	Niagara Falls Flyers (OMJHL)
119	Pat Russell (RW)	Canada	Philadelphia Flyers	Vancouver Nats (WCHL)
120	Yves Bergeron (RW)	Canada	Pittsburgh Penguins	Shawinigan Dynamos (QMJHL)
121	Gary Winchester (C)	Canada	St. Louis Blues	University of Wisconsin (WCHA)
122	Mike Ford (D)	Canada	Detroit Red Wings	Brandon Wheat Kings (WCHL)
123	Peter Williams (D)	Canada	Toronto Maple Leafs	University of Prince Edward Island (CIAU)
124	Bob Lundeen (D)	United States	Minnesota North Stars	University of Wisconsin (WCHA)
125	Billy Reay (RW)	Canada	Chicago Black Hawks	University of Wisconsin (WCHA)
126	Graham Parsons (G)	Canada	Montreal Canadiens	Red Deer Rustlers (AJHL)
127	Yvon Blais (D)	Canada	New York Rangers	Cornwall Royals (QMJHL)
128	Roy Carmichael (D)	Canada	Boston Bruins	New Westminster Bruins (WCHL)
^{Reference: "1972 NHL Amateur Draft hockeydraftcentral.com".}

1. The Los Angeles Kings' eighth-round pick went to the Minnesota North Stars as the result of a trade on June 8, 1972, that sent Los Angeles' tenth-round pick in the 1972 NHL Amateur Draft and this pick to Minnesota in exchange for cash.
2. The Buffalo Sabres' eighth-round pick went to the New York Islanders as the result of a trade on June 6, 1972, that the Islanders' promised to not take certain players in the 1972 NHL expansion draft in exchange for Buffalo's seventh-round (Don McLaughlin), ninth-round, tenth-round picks in the 1972 NHL Amateur Draft and this pick.

=== Round nine ===
#	Player	Nationality	NHL team	College/junior/club team
129	Yvon Rolando (RW)	Canada	New York Islanders	Drummondville Rangers (QMJHL)
130	Pierre Roy (D)	Canada	Atlanta Flames	Quebec Remparts (QMJHL)
131	Steve Stone (RW)	Canada	Vancouver Canucks	Niagara Falls Flyers (OMJHL)
132	Jean Lamarre (RW)	Canada	Atlanta Flames (from Los Angeles)^{1}	Quebec Remparts (QMJHL)
133	Bill Ennos (RW)	Canada	New York Islanders (from Buffalo)^{2}	Vancouver Nats (WCHL)
134	Denis Meloche (C)	Canada	California Golden Seals	Drummondville Rangers (QMJHL)
135	Ray Boutin (G)	Canada	Philadelphia Flyers	Sorel Eperviers (QMJHL)
136	Jay Babcock (LW)	Canada	Pittsburgh Penguins	London Knights (OMJHL)
137	Pierre Archambault (D)	Canada	New York Rangers (from St. Louis)^{3}	Saint-Jérôme Alouettes (QMJHL)
138	George Kuzmicz (D)	Canada	Detroit Red Wings	Cornell University (ECAC)
139	Pat Boutette (C)	Canada	Toronto Maple Leafs	University of Minnesota Duluth (WCHA)
140	Glen Mikkelson (RW)	Canada	Minnesota North Stars	Brandon Wheat Kings (WCHL)
141	Gary Donaldson (RW)	Canada	Chicago Black Hawks	Victoria Cougars (WCHL)
142	Eddie Bumbacco (LW)	Canada	Montreal Canadiens	University of Notre Dame (WCHA)
–	Not exercised		Atlanta Flames (from New York Rangers)^{4}	
143	Garry Schofield (D)	United States	Toronto Maple Leafs (from Boston)^{5}	Clarkson University (ECAC)
^{Reference: "1972 NHL Amateur Draft hockeydraftcentral.com".}

1. The Los Angeles Kings' ninth-round pick went to the Atlanta Flames as the result of a trade on June 6, 1972, that the Flames' promised to not take certain players in the 1972 NHL expansion draft in exchange for Los Angeles' tenth-round pick in the 1973 NHL amateur draft and this pick.
2. The Buffalo Sabres' ninth-round pick went to the New York Islanders as the result of a trade on June 6, 1972, that the Islanders' promised to not take certain players in the 1972 NHL expansion draft in exchange for Buffalo's seventh-round (Don McLaughlin), eight-round (Rene Levasseur), tenth-round picks in the 1972 NHL Amateur Draft and this pick.
3. The St. Louis Blues' ninth-round pick went to the New York Rangers as the result of a trade on June 8, 1972, that sent cash to St. Louis in exchange for this pick.
4. The New York Rangers' ninth-round pick went to the Atlanta Flames as the result of a trade on June 6, 1972, that the Flames' promised to not take certain players in the 1972 NHL expansion draft in exchange for this pick. The Flames passed on making a selection.
5. The Boston Bruins' ninth-round pick went to the Toronto Maple Leafs as the result of a trade on June 8, 1972, that sent this pick to Toronto in exchange for cash.

=== Round ten ===
#	Player	Nationality	NHL team	College/junior/club team
144	Garry Howatt (LW)	Canada	New York Islanders	Flin Flon Bombers (WCHL)
145	Steve Lyon (D)	Canada	Minnesota North Stars (from Los Angeles)^{1}	Peterborough Petes (OMJHL)
146	Rene Lambert (RW)	Canada	New York Islanders (from Buffalo)^{2}	St. Jerome Alouettes (QMJHL)
147	Juri Kudrasovs (C)	Canada	Minnesota North Stars (from California)^{3}	Kitchener Rangers (OMJHL)
148	Marcel Comeau (C)	Canada	Minnesota North Stars (from Philadelphia)^{4}	Edmonton Oil Kings (WCHL)
149	Don Atchison (G)	Canada	Pittsburgh Penguins	Saskatoon Blades (WCHL)
150	Dave Arundel (D)	United States	Detroit Red Wings	University of Wisconsin (WCHA)
–	Not exercised		Minnesota North Stars (from Toronto)^{5}	
151	Fred Riggall (RW)	Canada	Montreal Canadiens	Dartmouth College (ECAC)
^{Reference: "1972 NHL Amateur Draft hockeydraftcentral.com".}

1. The Los Angeles Kings' eighth-round pick went to the Minnesota North Stars as the result of a trade on June 8, 1972, that sent Los Angeles' eighth-round pick in the 1972 NHL Amateur Draft (Scott MacPhail) and this pick to Minnesota in exchange for cash.
2. The Buffalo Sabres' tenth-round pick went to the New York Islanders as the result of a trade on June 6, 1972, that the Islanders' promised to not take certain players in the 1972 NHL expansion draft in exchange for Buffalo's seventh-round (Don McLaughlin), eight-round (Rene Levasseur), ninth-round (Bill Ennos) picks in the 1972 NHL Amateur Draft and this pick.
3. The California Golden Seals' tenth-round pick went to the Minnesota North Stars as the result of a trade on June 8, 1972, that sent this pick to Minnesota in exchange for cash.
4. The Philadelphia Flyers' tenth-round pick went to the Minnesota North Stars as the result of a trade on June 8, 1972, that sent this pick to Minnesota in exchange for cash.
5. The Toronto Maple Leafs' tenth-round pick went to the Minnesota North Stars as the result of a trade on June 8, 1972, that sent cash to Toronto in exchange for this pick. The North Stars passed on making a selection.

=== Round eleven ===
#	Player	Nationality	NHL team	College/junior/club team
152	Ron LeBlanc (RW)	Canada	Montreal Canadiens	Université de Moncton (CIAU)
^{Reference: "1972 NHL Amateur Draft hockeydraftcentral.com".}

= NHL All-Star team ·	= NHL All-Star ·	= NHL All-Star and NHL All-Star team ·	= Hall of Famers

== Draftees based on nationality ==
Rank	Country	Number
1	Canada	142
2	United States	10

== See also ==
- 1972–73 NHL season
- 1972 NHL expansion draft
- List of NHL players
