= Jack Lynch (ice hockey) =

Canadian ice hockey player

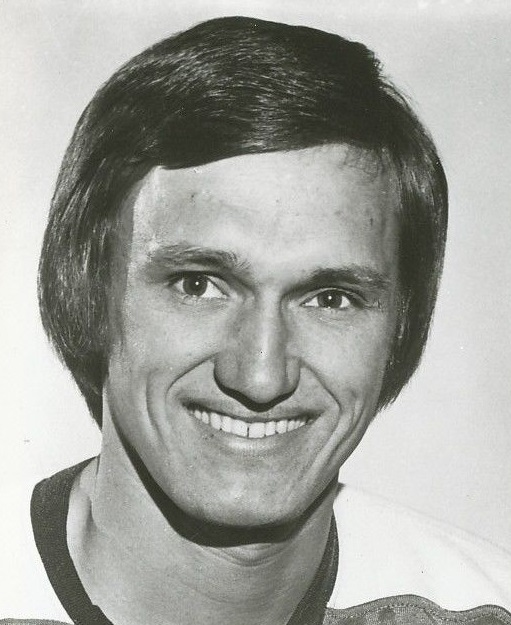
- Lynch in 1973
- Born: May 28, 1952 (age 74) Toronto, Ontario, Canada
- Height: 6 ft 2 in (188 cm)
- Weight: 180 lb (82 kg; 12 st 12 lb)
- Position: Defence
- Shot: Right
- Played for: Pittsburgh Penguins; Detroit Red Wings; Washington Capitals
- NHL draft: 24th overall, 1972; Pittsburgh Penguins
- Playing career: 1972–1979

John Alan Lynch (born May 28, 1952) is a Canadian former professional ice hockey defenceman. Lynch played for the Pittsburgh Penguins, Detroit Red Wings and Washington Capitals.

Lynch was born in Toronto, Ontario. He played junior hockey with the Oshawa Generals. He was selected by the Penguins in the 1972 NHL Amateur Draft.

Lynch was traded from Detroit to Washington in February 1975. At the time of the trade, Lynch was a plus-minus rating of -15 after 50 games, but in just 20 games with the Caps he increased this to -54, giving him a total of -69 for the season.

== Career statistics ==
			Regular Season					Playoffs
Season	Team	League	GP	G	A	Pts	PIM	GP	G	A	Pts	PIM
1970–71	Oshawa Generals	OHA	60	18	29	47	86	—	—	—	—	—
1971–72	Oshawa Generals	OHA	59	18	38	56	55	—	—	—	—	—
1972–73	Hershey Bears	AHL	26	4	17	21	26	7	0	1	1	28
1972–73	Pittsburgh Penguins	NHL	47	1	18	19	40	—	—	—	—	—
1973–74	Hershey Bears	AHL	20	3	10	13	24	—	—	—	—	—
1973–74	Pittsburgh Penguins	NHL	17	0	7	7	21	—	—	—	—	—
1973–74	Detroit Red Wings	NHL	35	3	9	12	27	—	—	—	—	—
1974–75	Detroit Red Wings	NHL	50	2	15	17	46	—	—	—	—	—
1974–75	Washington Capitals	NHL	20	1	5	6	16	—	—	—	—	—
1975–76	Washington Capitals	NHL	79	9	13	22	78	—	—	—	—	—
1976–77	Washington Capitals	NHL	75	5	25	30	90	—	—	—	—	—
1977–78	Washington Capitals	NHL	29	1	8	9	4	—	—	—	—	—
1978–79	Hershey Bears	AHL	20	7	6	13	8	—	—	—	—	—
1978–79	Washington Capitals	NHL	30	2	6	8	14	—	—	—	—	—
NHL total			382	24	106	130	336	0	0	0	0	0
