= Brian Bowles (ice hockey) =

Canadian ice hockey player

- Born: February 18, 1952 (age 73) Drummondville, Quebec, Canada
- Height: 5 ft 11 in (180 cm)
- Weight: 181 lb (82 kg; 12 st 13 lb)
- Position: Defence
- Shot: Right
- Played for: Cleveland Crusaders
- NHL draft: 59th overall, 1972; Toronto Maple Leafs
- Playing career: 1972–1976

Brian Earl Bowles (born February 18, 1952) is a Canadian former professional ice hockey player who played in the World Hockey Association (WHA). Bowles played three games with the Cleveland Crusaders during the 1975–76 WHA season. He was drafted in the fourth round of the 1972 NHL Amateur Draft by the Toronto Maple Leafs. He played in the 1963 Quebec International Pee-Wee Hockey Tournament with his Drummondville minor ice hockey team.

== Career statistics ==
			Regular season					Playoffs
Season	Team	League	GP	G	A	Pts	PIM	GP	G	A	Pts	PIM
1969–70	Drummondville Rangers	QMJHL	53	3	13	16	67	6	0	0	0	14
1970–71	Drummondville Rangers	QMJHL	9	0	3	3	2	—	—	—	—	—
1970–71	Verdun Maple Leafs	QMJHL	52	4	25	29	68	5	0	1	1	4
1971–72	Verdun Maple Leafs	QMJHL	20	2	15	17	10	—	—	—	—	—
1971–72	Cornwall Royals	QMJHL	37	3	17	20	57	16	0	11	11	4
1972–73	Tulsa Oilers	CHL	72	11	28	39	40	—	—	—	—	—
1973–74	Tulsa Oilers	CHL	11	0	1	1	4	—	—	—	—	—
1973–74	Rochester Americans	AHL	13	1	2	3	4	3	0	0	0	2
1973–74	Saginaw Gears	IHL	6	0	2	2	0	—	—	—	—	—
1974–75	Oklahoma City Blazers	CHL	50	1	18	19	22	5	1	0	1	4
1975–76	Syracuse Blazers	NAHL-Sr.	43	8	24	32	61	—	—	—	—	—
1975–76	Cleveland Crusaders	WHA	3	0	0	0	0	—	—	—	—	—
WHA totals			3	0	0	0	0	—	—	—	—	—
CHL totals			133	12	47	59	66	5	1	0	1	4
