= Dick Redmond =

Canadian ice hockey player (born 1949)

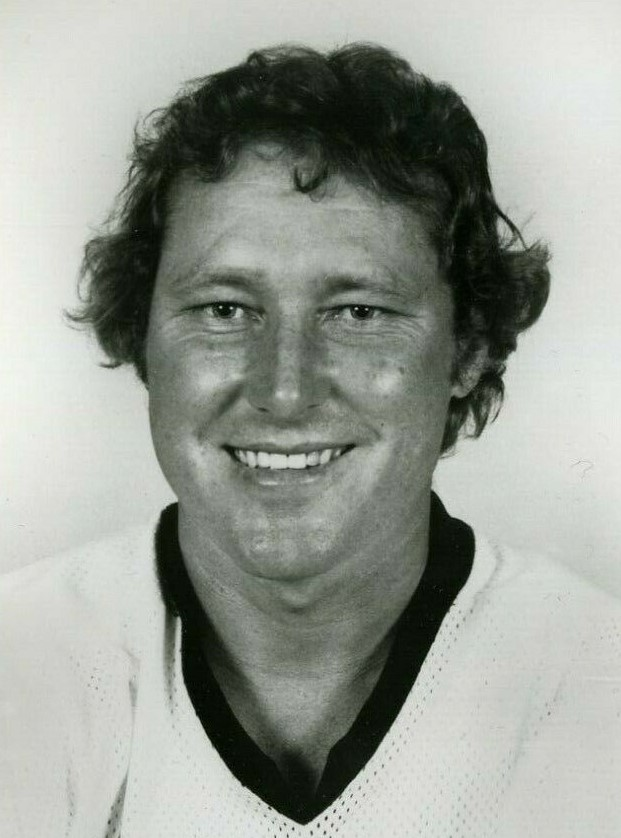
- Born: August 14, 1949 (age 77) Kirkland Lake, Ontario, Canada
- Height: 5 ft 11 in (180 cm)
- Weight: 172 lb (78 kg; 12 st 4 lb)
- Position: Defence
- Shot: Left
- Played for: Minnesota North Stars; California Golden Seals; Chicago Black Hawks; St.Louis Blues; Atlanta Flames; Boston Bruins
- NHL draft: 5th overall, 1969; Minnesota North Stars
- Playing career: 1969–1982

Richard John Redmond (born August 14, 1949) is a Canadian former professional National Hockey League (NHL) defenceman. He featured in the 1973 Stanley Cup Finals with the Chicago Blackhawks.

He is the son of former Allan Cup winner Eddie Redmond and the brother of former NHL player and Red Wings broadcaster Mickey Redmond. He was born in Kirkland Lake, Ontario, but grew up in Peterborough, Ontario.

Redmond played minor ice hockey in Peterborough, and went to the 1962 Quebec International Pee-Wee Hockey Tournament with his youth team. He played 13 seasons in the NHL, beginning as a first-round draft pick with the Minnesota North Stars in 1969. He was traded in 1970 to the California Golden Seals, and from there he was traded to the Chicago Black Hawks in 1972. In five seasons with the Black Hawks, Redmond played in 341 games and accumulated 227 points with 218 PIM. He was traded along with Bob MacMillan, Yves Bélanger and a second‐round selection in the 1979 NHL entry draft (23rd overall–Mike Perovich) from the St. Louis Blues to the Atlanta Flames for Phil Myre, Curt Bennett and Barry Gibbs on December 12, 1977. He finished his career with the Boston Bruins.

== Career statistics ==
| | | | Regular season | | | | | Playoffs |
| Season | Team | League | GP | G | A | Pts | PIM | GP | G | A | Pts | PIM |
|---|---|---|---|---|---|---|---|---|---|---|---|---|
| 1966–67 | Peterborough Petes | OHA-Jr. | 40 | 2 | 7 | 9 | 77 | 6 | 0 | 2 | 2 | 2 |
| 1967–68 | Peterborough Petes | OHA-Jr. | 52 | 7 | 28 | 35 | 84 | 5 | 3 | 0 | 3 | 2 |
| 1968–69 | Peterborough Petes | OHA-Jr. | 6 | 2 | 2 | 4 | 44 | — | — | — | — | — |
| 1968–69 | St. Catharines Black Hawks | OHA-Jr. | 44 | 31 | 43 | 74 | 136 | 18 | 11 | 17 | 28 | 35 |
| 1969–70 | Minnesota North Stars | NHL | 7 | 0 | 1 | 1 | 4 | — | — | — | — | — |
| 1969–70 | Iowa Stars | CHL | 56 | 7 | 23 | 30 | 65 | 11 | 2 | 8 | 10 | 26 |
| 1970–71 | Minnesota North Stars | NHL | 9 | 0 | 2 | 2 | 16 | — | — | — | — | — |
| 1970–71 | Cleveland Barons | AHL | 49 | 6 | 13 | 19 | 69 | — | — | — | — | — |
| 1970–71 | California Golden Seals | NHL | 11 | 2 | 4 | 6 | 12 | — | — | — | — | — |
| 1971–72 | California Golden Seals | NHL | 74 | 10 | 35 | 45 | 76 | — | — | — | — | — |
| 1972–73 | California Golden Seals | NHL | 24 | 3 | 13 | 16 | 22 | — | — | — | — | — |
| 1972–73 | Chicago Black Hawks | NHL | 52 | 9 | 19 | 28 | 4 | 13 | 4 | 2 | 6 | 2 |
| 1973–74 | Chicago Black Hawks | NHL | 76 | 17 | 42 | 59 | 69 | 11 | 1 | 7 | 8 | 8 |
| 1974–75 | Chicago Black Hawks | NHL | 80 | 14 | 43 | 57 | 90 | 8 | 2 | 3 | 5 | 0 |
| 1975–76 | Chicago Black Hawks | NHL | 53 | 9 | 27 | 36 | 25 | 4 | 0 | 2 | 2 | 4 |
| 1976–77 | Chicago Black Hawks | NHL | 80 | 22 | 25 | 47 | 30 | 2 | 0 | 1 | 1 | 0 |
| 1977–78 | St. Louis Blues | NHL | 28 | 4 | 11 | 15 | 16 | — | — | — | — | — |
| 1977–78 | Atlanta Flames | NHL | 42 | 7 | 11 | 18 | 16 | 2 | 1 | 0 | 1 | 0 |
| 1978–79 | Boston Bruins | NHL | 64 | 7 | 26 | 33 | 21 | 11 | 1 | 3 | 4 | 2 |
| 1979–80 | Boston Bruins | NHL | 76 | 14 | 33 | 47 | 39 | 10 | 0 | 3 | 3 | 9 |
| 1980–81 | Boston Bruins | NHL | 78 | 15 | 20 | 35 | 60 | 3 | 0 | 1 | 1 | 2 |
| 1981–82 | Boston Bruins | NHL | 17 | 0 | 0 | 0 | 4 | 2 | 0 | 0 | 0 | 0 |
| 1981–82 | Erie Blades | AHL | 31 | 8 | 12 | 20 | 14 | — | — | — | — | — |
| NHL totals | | | 771 | 133 | 312 | 445 | 504 | 66 | 9 | 22 | 31 | 27 |

| Preceded by Jim Benzelock | Minnesota North Stars first-round draft pick 1969 | Succeeded by Jerry Byers |
