= Chris Ahrens (ice hockey) =

American ice hockey player (b. 1952)

- Born: July 31, 1952 (age 73) San Bernardino, California, U.S.
- Height: 6 ft 0 in (183 cm)
- Weight: 185 lb (84 kg; 13 st 3 lb)
- Position: Defense
- Shot: Right
- Played for: NHL; Minnesota North Stars; WHA; Edmonton Oilers
- NHL draft: 76th overall, 1972; Minnesota North Stars
- Playing career: 1972–1978

Christopher Alfred Ahrens (born July 31, 1952) is an American former professional ice hockey defenseman who played six seasons in the National Hockey League for the Minnesota North Stars, and four games in the WHA with the Edmonton Oilers.

== Early life ==
Ahrens was born in San Bernardino, California, and grew up in Freeport, New York. He played junior hockey with the New Hyde Park Arrows and Kitchener Rangers.

== Career ==
Ahrens was drafted in the fifth round, 76th overall in the 1972 NHL entry draft by the Minnesota North Stars. Ahrens played the majority of his professional career in the minor leagues (AHL, CHL), interspersed with 53 games, over six seasons, with the North Stars, as well as four games with the Edmonton Oilers in the World Hockey Association.

== Career statistics ==
			Regular season					Playoffs
Season	Team	League	GP	G	A	Pts	PIM	GP	G	A	Pts	PIM
1969–70	Kitchener Rangers	OHA	4	1	0	1	0	—	—	—	—	—
1970–71	Kitchener Rangers	OHA	54	7	14	21	203	—	—	—	—	—
1971–72	Kitchener Rangers	OHA	40	3	22	25	64	—	—	—	—	—
1972–73	Cleveland Barons	AHL	76	2	17	19	248	—	—	—	—	—
1972–73	Minnesota North Stars	NHL	—	—	—	—	—	1	0	0	0	0
1973–74	New Haven Nighthawks	AHL	73	4	20	24	177	10	1	0	1	45
1973–74	Minnesota North Stars	NHL	3	0	1	1	0	—	—	—	—	—
1974–75	New Haven Nighthawks	AHL	23	1	10	11	132	16	2	5	7	106
1974–75	Minnesota North Stars	NHL	44	0	2	2	77	—	—	—	—	—
1975–76	New Haven Nighthawks	AHL	70	2	8	10	121	3	0	0	0	12
1975–76	Minnesota North Stars	NHL	2	0	0	0	2	—	—	—	—	—
1976–77	New Haven Nighthawks	AHL	29	1	6	7	82	—	—	—	—	—
1976–77	Rhode Island Reds	AHL	42	1	7	8	82	—	—	—	—	—
1976–77	Minnesota North Stars	NHL	2	0	0	0	5	—	—	—	—	—
1977–78	Fort Worth Texans	CHL	50	1	10	11	137	—	—	—	—	—
1977–78	Edmonton Oilers	WHA	4	0	0	0	15	—	—	—	—	—
1977–78	Minnesota North Stars	NHL	1	0	0	0	0	—	—	—	—	—
NHL totals			52	0	3	3	84	1	0	0	0	0
WHA totals			4	0	0	0	15	—	—	—	—	—
