= 1972–73 California Golden Seals season =

NHL season

1972–73 California Golden Seals
- Division: 8th West
- 1972–73 record: 16–46–16
- Home record: 11–15–13
- Road record: 5–31–3
- Goals for: 213
- Goals against: 323

Team information
- General manager: Garry Young; Fred Glover
- Coach: Garry Young; Fred Glover
- Captain: Bert Marshall; Joey Johnston
- Arena: Oakland Coliseum Arena

Team leaders
- Goals: Joey Johnston (28)
- Assists: Walt McKechnie (38)
- Points: Walt McKechnie (54)
- Penalty minutes: Bob Stewart (181)
- Wins: Gilles Meloche (12)
- Goals against average: Gilles Meloche (4.06)

The 1972–73 California Golden Seals season was the California Golden Seals' sixth season in the National Hockey League (NHL). The Seals were hit particularly hard by defections to the new World Hockey Association, dropping 12 points from the previous year and returning to the basement of the West Division. The Seals had the second worst record in the league, the only team they finished ahead of was the expansion New York Islanders. Making things even worse was that they finished behind one of the two expansion clubs that season, the Atlanta Flames.

== Offseason ==
=== Amateur draft ===
Round	Pick	Player	Nationality	College/Junior/Club team
2	22.	Tom Cassidy	Canada	Kitchener Rangers (OHA)
2	28.	Stan Weir	Canada	Medicine Hat Tigers (WCHL)
3	38.	Paul Shakes	Canada	St. Catharines Black Hawks (OHA)
4	54.	Claude St. Sauveur	Canada	Sherbrooke Beavers (QMJHL)
5	70.	Tim Jacobs	Canada	St. Catharines Black Hawks (OHA)
6	86.	Jacques Lefebvre	Canada	Shawinigan Bruins (QMJHL)
7	102.	Mike Amodeo	Canada	Oshawa Generals (OHA)
8	118.	Brent Meeke	Canada	Niagara Falls Flyers (OHA)
9	134.	Denis Meloche	Canada	Drummondville Rangers (QMJHL)

== Regular season ==
=== Final standings ===
West Division
		GP	W	L	T	GF	GA	DIFF	Pts
1	Chicago Black Hawks	78	42	27	9	284	225	+59	93
2	Philadelphia Flyers	78	37	30	11	296	256	+40	85
3	Minnesota North Stars	78	37	30	11	254	230	+24	85
4	St. Louis Blues	78	32	34	12	233	251	−18	76
5	Pittsburgh Penguins	78	32	37	9	257	265	−8	73
6	Los Angeles Kings	78	31	36	11	232	245	−13	73
7	Atlanta Flames	78	25	38	15	191	239	−48	65
8	California Golden Seals	78	16	46	16	213	323	−110	48

=== Record vs. opponents ===
==== Vs. West Division ====
1972–73 NHL records
Team	ATL	CAL	CHI	LAK	MIN	PHI	PIT	STL	Total
Atlanta	—	3–1–1	2–4	1–1–3	3–3	1–3–1	1–4	0–3–3	11–19–8
California	1–3–1	—	0–3–2	2–4	1–4	1–3–2	2–2–2	1–3–1	8–22–8
Chicago	4–2	3–0–2	—	2–3	3–2–1	2–2–1	2–3	3–3	19–15–4
Los Angeles	1–1–3	4–2	3–2	—	0–3–2	4–2	2–4	3–2	17–16–5
Minnesota	3–3	4–1	2–3–1	3–0–2	—	2–3	3–2	2–2–2	19–14–5
Philadelphia	3–1–1	3–1–2	2–2–1	2–4	3–2	—	4–2	3–1–1	20–13–5
Pittsburgh	4–1	2–2–2	3–2	4–2	2–3	2–4	—	3–2	20–16–2
St. Louis	3–0–3	3–1–1	3–3	2–3	2–2–2	1–3–1	2–3	—	16–15–7

==== Vs. East Division ====
1972–73 NHL records
Team	BOS	BUF	DET	MTL	NYI	NYR	TOR	VAN	Total
Atlanta	0–5	1–2–2	2–3	0–3–2	4–0–1	1–4	2–1–2	4–1	14–19–7
California	0–4–1	2–1–2	2–2–1	0–3–2	1–4	1–3–1	1–3–1	1–4	8–24–8
Chicago	3–2	3–2	3–2	3–2	4–0–1	2–2–1	2–1–2	3–1–1	23–12–5
Los Angeles	2–3	1–2–2	2–2–1	0–4–1	4–1	0–3–2	2–3	3–2	14–20–6
Minnesota	1–3–1	2–3	3–1–1	1–3–1	4–1	2–3	2–2–1	3–0–2	18–16–6
Philadelphia	0–4–1	3–2	1–3–1	2–2–1	4–1	0–4–1	3–1–1	4–0–1	17–17–6
Pittsburgh	1–4	0–3–2	0–2–3	0–5	4–0–1	2–3	2–2–1	3–2	12–21–7
St. Louis	3–2	1–2–2	3–2	0–3–2	3–1–1	0–5	2–3	4–1	16–19–5

== Schedule and results ==
1972–73 regular season
October

Game	Result	Date	Score	Opponent	Record
1	L	October 7, 1972	2–3	@ Vancouver Canucks (1972–73)	0–1–0
2	L	October 11, 1972	2–5	@ Minnesota North Stars (1972–73)	0–2–0
3	L	October 14, 1972	2–5	@ Pittsburgh Penguins (1972–73)	0–3–0
4	W	October 15, 1972	4–1	@ Philadelphia Flyers (1972–73)	1–3–0
5	T	October 20, 1972	3–3	Philadelphia Flyers (1972–73)	1–3–1
6	L	October 22, 1972	2–4	Chicago Black Hawks (1972–73)	1–4–1
7	L	October 24, 1972	0–5	@ Los Angeles Kings (1972–73)	1–5–1
8	L	October 25, 1972	3–4	Atlanta Flames (1972–73)	1–6–1
9	W	October 27, 1972	6–3	Pittsburgh Penguins (1972–73)	2–6–1

November

Game	Result	Date	Score	Opponent	Record
10	L	November 1, 1972	2–6	New York Islanders (1972–73)	2–7–1
11	T	November 3, 1972	6–6	Boston Bruins (1972–73)	2–7–2
12	T	November 5, 1972	3–3	@ Chicago Black Hawks (1972–73)	2–7–3
13	L	November 8, 1972	2–5	@ Minnesota North Stars (1972–73)	2–8–3
14	T	November 9, 1972	0–0	@ Buffalo Sabres (1972–73)	2–8–4
15	L	November 11, 1972	2–7	@ New York Rangers (1972–73)	2–9–4
16	L	November 12, 1972	3–8	@ Philadelphia Flyers (1972–73)	2–10–4
17	L	November 15, 1972	0–4	Detroit Red Wings (1972–73)	2–11–4
18	W	November 17, 1972	5–1	Buffalo Sabres (1972–73)	3–11–4
19	L	November 21, 1972	2–4	@ New York Islanders (1972–73)	3–12–4
20	L	November 23, 1972	2–4	@ Boston Bruins (1972–73)	3–13–4
21	L	November 25, 1972	0–11	@ Toronto Maple Leafs (1972–73)	3–14–4
22	W	November 26, 1972	6–4	@ Detroit Red Wings (1972–73)	4–14–4
23	L	November 29, 1972	1–2	St. Louis Blues (1972–73)	4–15–4

December

Game	Result	Date	Score	Opponent	Record
24	T	December 1, 1972	3–3	New York Rangers (1972–73)	4–15–5
25	T	December 6, 1972	4–4	Pittsburgh Penguins (1972–73)	4–15–6
26	L	December 9, 1972	1–2	@ Montreal Canadiens (1972–73)	4–16–6
27	L	December 10, 1972	4–8	@ Boston Bruins (1972–73)	4–17–6
28	T	December 13, 1972	2–2	Montreal Canadiens (1972–73)	4–17–7
29	L	December 15, 1972	4–9	Chicago Black Hawks (1972–73)	4–18–7
30	L	December 16, 1972	3–4	@ Vancouver Canucks (1972–73)	4–19–7
31	L	December 20, 1972	2–5	Minnesota North Stars (1972–73)	4–20–7
32	W	December 22, 1972	4–2	Buffalo Sabres (1972–73)	5–20–7
33	L	December 24, 1972	3–5	Los Angeles Kings (1972–73)	5–21–7
34	L	December 26, 1972	3–4	@ Vancouver Canucks (1972–73)	5–22–7
35	T	December 27, 1972	2–2	Philadelphia Flyers (1972–73)	5–22–8
36	W	December 29, 1972	5–2	New York Islanders (1972–73)	6–22–8

January

Game	Result	Date	Score	Opponent	Record
37	W	January 3, 1973	11–3	Vancouver Canucks (1972–73)	7–22–8
38	L	January 6, 1973	0–5	@ Montreal Canadiens (1972–73)	7–23–8
39	L	January 7, 1973	0–4	@ Toronto Maple Leafs (1972–73)	7–24–8
40	W	January 10, 1973	6–5	St. Louis Blues (1972–73)	8–24–8
41	T	January 12, 1973	3–3	Montreal Canadiens (1972–73)	8–24–9
42	T	January 14, 1973	6–6	@ Chicago Black Hawks (1972–73)	8–24–10
43	T	January 17, 1973	3–3	Toronto Maple Leafs (1972–73)	8–24–11
44	L	January 19, 1973	0–6	New York Rangers (1972–73)	8–25–11
45	L	January 21, 1973	2–5	@ Boston Bruins (1972–73)	8–26–11
46	L	January 23, 1973	1–8	@ New York Islanders (1972–73)	8–27–11
47	W	January 24, 1973	5–2	@ Atlanta Flames (1972–73)	9–27–11
48	T	January 26, 1973	1–1	St. Louis Blues (1972–73)	9–27–12
49	L	January 28, 1973	3–4	@ Philadelphia Flyers (1972–73)	9–28–12
50	L	January 31, 1973	1–3	@ New York Rangers (1972–73)	9–29–12

February

Game	Result	Date	Score	Opponent	Record
51	L	February 1, 1973	4–6	@ Detroit Red Wings (1972–73)	9–30–12
52	L	February 3, 1973	1–6	@ St. Louis Blues (1972–73)	9–31–12
53	L	February 4, 1973	1–6	Montreal Canadiens (1972–73)	9–32–12
54	L	February 7, 1973	3–5	@ Toronto Maple Leafs (1972–73)	9–33–12
55	L	February 8, 1973	0–4	@ Buffalo Sabres (1972–73)	9–34–12
56	L	February 10, 1973	2–5	@ St. Louis Blues (1972–73)	9–35–12
57	L	February 11, 1973	1–3	@ Atlanta Flames (1972–73)	9–36–12
58	T	February 14, 1973	3–3	Atlanta Flames (1972–73)	9–36–13
59	T	February 16, 1973	2–2	Detroit Red Wings (1972–73)	9–36–14
60	L	February 18, 1973	2–4	Los Angeles Kings (1972–73)	9–37–14
61	L	February 21, 1973	2–6	Boston Bruins (1972–73)	9–38–14
62	W	February 23, 1973	5–3	New York Rangers (1972–73)	10–38–14
63	L	February 25, 1973	0–7	Philadelphia Flyers (1972–73)	10–39–14
64	L	February 28, 1973	3–7	@ Minnesota North Stars (1972–73)	10–40–14

March

Game	Result	Date	Score	Opponent	Record
65	W	March 3, 1973	2–1	@ Pittsburgh Penguins (1972–73)	11–40–14
66	L	March 4, 1973	2–3	@ Atlanta Flames (1972–73)	11–41–14
67	T	March 7, 1973	2–2	Buffalo Sabres (1972–73)	11–41–15
68	L	March 10, 1973	2–4	@ Los Angeles Kings (1972–73)	11–42–15
69	L	March 11, 1973	1–5	Chicago Black Hawks (1972–73)	11–43–15
70	L	March 14, 1973	2–5	Vancouver Canucks (1972–73)	11–44–15
71	T	March 16, 1973	5–5	Pittsburgh Penguins (1972–73)	11–44–16
72	W	March 18, 1973	2–0	Minnesota North Stars (1972–73)	12–44–16
73	L	March 20, 1973	3–6	@ New York Islanders (1972–73)	12–45–16
74	L	March 21, 1973	2–5	@ Pittsburgh Penguins (1972–73)	12–46–16
75	W	March 23, 1973	7–4	Toronto Maple Leafs (1972–73)	13–46–16
76	W	March 25, 1973	8–5	Detroit Red Wings (1972–73)	14–46–16
77	W	March 28, 1973	3–2	@ Los Angeles Kings (1972–73)	15–46–16
78	W	March 30, 1973	3–1	Los Angeles Kings (1972–73)	16–46–16

Legend: Win (2 points) Loss (0 points) Tie (1 point)

== Player statistics ==
=== Skaters ===
Note: GP = Games played; G = Goals; A = Assists; Pts = Points; PIM = Penalties in minutes

		Regular season					Playoffs
Player	#	GP	G	A	Pts	PIM	GP	G	A	Pts	PIM
Walt McKechnie	8	78	16	38	54	58	–	–	–	–	–
Hilliard Graves	17	75	27	25	52	34	–	–	–	–	–
Joey Johnston	22	71	28	21	49	62	–	–	–	–	–
Craig Patrick	14	71	20	22	42	6	–	–	–	–	–
Pete Laframboise	24	77	16	25	41	26	–	–	–	–	–
Stan Weir	21	78	15	24	39	16	–	–	–	–	–
Reggie Leach	7	76	23	12	35	45	–	–	–	–	–
Ivan Boldirev	9	56	11	23	34	58	–	–	–	–	–
Rick Smith	5	64	9	24	33	77	–	–	–	–	–
Marshall Johnston	2	78	10	20	30	14	–	–	–	–	–
Darryl Maggs†	4	54	7	15	22	46	–	–	–	–	–
Gary Croteau	18	47	6	15	21	8	–	–	–	–	–
Stan Gilbertson	15	66	6	15	21	19	–	–	–	–	–
Bob Stewart	6	63	4	17	21	181	–	–	–	–	–
Ted McAneeley	23	77	4	13	17	75	–	–	–	–	–
Dick Redmond‡	4	24	3	13	16	22	–	–	–	–	–
Morris Mott	20	70	6	7	13	8	–	–	–	–	–
Bert Marshall‡	19	55	2	6	8	71	–	–	–	–	–
Terry Murray	26	23	0	3	3	4	–	–	–	–	–
Gilles Meloche	27	59	0	2	2	4	–	–	–	–	–
Marv Edwards	1	21	0	1	1	6	–	–	–	–	–
Pete Vipond	15	2	0	0	0	0	–	–	–	–	–
Brent Meeke	25	3	0	0	0	0	–	–	–	–	–
Del Hall	12	6	0	0	0	0	–	–	–	–	–

†Denotes player spent time with another team before joining Seals. Stats reflect time with the Seals only. ‡Traded mid-season

=== Goaltenders ===
Note: GP = Games played; TOI = Time on ice (minutes); W= Wins; L = Losses; T = Ties; GA = Goals against; SO = Shutouts; GAA = Goals against average

		Regular season								Playoffs
Player	#	GP	TOI	W	L	T	GA	SO	GAA	GP	TOI	W	L	GA	SO	GAA
Gilles Meloche	27	59	3473	12	32	14	235	1	4.06	–	–	–	–	–	–	-.--
Marv Edwards	1	21	1207	4	14	2	87	1	4.32	–	–	–	–	–	–	-.--

== Transactions ==
The Seals were involved in the following transactions during the 1972–73 season:

=== Trades ===
June, 1972	To California Golden Seals Barry Cummins	To Portland Buckaroos (WHL) $15,000
December 5, 1972	To California Golden Seals Darryl Maggs	To Chicago Black Hawks Dick Redmond rights to Bobby Sheehan
March 4, 1973	To California Golden Seals cash future considerations (Dave Hrechkosy & Gary Coalter; May 17, 1973)	To New York Rangers Bert Marshall

=== Additions and subtractions ===
Additions
Player	Former team	Via
Marv Edwards	Toronto Maple Leafs	Reverse draft (1972–06–08)
Ron Huston	Spokane Jets (WIHL)	free agency (1972–09)
Morris Mott	Queen's University (OUAA)	free agency (1972–10–01)

Subtractions
Player	New team	Via
Ernie Hicke	Atlanta Flames	Expansion draft (1972–06–06)
Norm Ferguson	New York Islanders	Expansion draft (1972–06–06)
Frank Hughes	Atlanta Flames	Expansion draft (1972–06–06)
Ken Baird	Alberta Oilers (WHA)	free agency
Gary Jarrett	Cleveland Crusaders (WHA)	free agency
Gary Kurt	New York Raiders (WHA)	free agency
Gerry Pinder	Cleveland Crusaders (WHA)	free agency
Bobby Sheehan	New York Raiders (WHA)	free agency
Paul Shmyr	Cleveland Crusaders (WHA)	free agency
Tom Webster	New England Whalers (WHA)	free agency
