= 1972–73 Atlanta Flames season =

NHL team season (inaugural season)

1972–73 Atlanta Flames
- Division: 7th West
- 1972–73 record: 25–38–15
- Home record: 16–16–7
- Road record: 9–22–8
- Goals for: 191
- Goals against: 239

Team information
- General manager: Cliff Fletcher
- Coach: Bernie Geoffrion
- Captain: Keith McCreary
- Alternate captains: Pat Quinn; Curt Bennett
- Arena: Omni Coliseum

Team leaders
- Goals: Bob Leiter (26)
- Assists: Bob Leiter (34)
- Points: Bob Leiter (60)
- Penalty minutes: Pat Quinn (113)
- Wins: Phil Myre (16)
- Goals against average: Phil Myre (3.03)

The 1972–73 Atlanta Flames season was the 1st season for the Flames' franchise.

== Offseason ==
=== NHL amateur draft ===
Round	Pick	Player	Nationality	College/Junior/Club team
1	2.	Jacques Richard	Canada	Quebec Remparts (QMJHL)
2	18.	Dwight Bialowas	Canada	Regina Pats (WCJHL)
3	34.	Jean Lemieux	Canada	Sherbrooke Castors (QMJHL)
4	50.	Don Martineau	Canada	New Westminster Royals (WCJHL)
5	78.	Jean-Paul Martin	Canada	Shawinigan Bruins (QMJHL)
6	82.	Frank Blum	Canada	Sarnia Sting (SOJHL)
7	98.	Scott Smith	Canada	Regina Pats (WCJHL)
8	114.	Dave Murphy	Canada	Hamilton Red Wings (OHA)
9	130.	Pierre Roy	Canada	Quebec Remparts (QMJHL)
9	132.	Jean Lamarre	Canada	Quebec Remparts (QMJHL)

=== NHL Expansion Draft ===
Pick	Player	Position	Drafted From
1.	Phil Myre	G	Montreal Canadiens
3.	Dan Bouchard	G	Boston Bruins
6.	Kerry Ketter	D	Montreal Canadiens
8.	Norm Gratton	LW	New York Rangers
10.	Ron Harris	D	Detroit Red Wings
12.	Larry Romanchych	RW	Chicago Black Hawks
14.	Bill MacMillan	LW	Toronto Maple Leafs
16.	Randy Manery	D	Detroit Red Wings
18.	Keith McCreary	RW	Pittsburgh Penguins
20.	Ernie Hicke	C	California Golden Seals
22.	Lew Morrison	RW	Philadelphia Flyers
24.	Lucien Grenier	LW	Los Angeles Kings
26.	Bill Plager	D	St. Louis Blues
28.	Morris Stefaniw	C	New York Rangers
30.	John Stewart	LW	Pittsburgh Penguins
32.	Bob Leiter	C	Pittsburgh Penguins
34.	Pat Quinn	D	Vancouver Canucks
36.	Larry Hale	D	Philadelphia Flyers
38.	Bill Heindl Jr.	LW	Minnesota North Stars
40.	Frank Hughes	LW	California Golden Seals
42.	Rod Zaine	C	Buffalo Sabres

== Regular season ==
When it was first announced that Atlanta would have an NHL franchise many hockey observers thought that a team based in the southern United States was a ludicrous and foolish move, especially since the talent pool had been diluted by repeated expansion and the upstart WHA. Nevertheless, the team quickly began front office operations, naming young St. Louis Blues assistant general manager Cliff Fletcher as general manager. Soon after, Fletcher had found the team its first coach: former Canadiens star forward Bernie "Boom-Boom" Geoffrion.

The team was a surprise in its first season on the ice, its success built on new star goaltenders Dan Bouchard and Phil Myre, solid defensemen such as Randy Manery and Pat Quinn, and forwards Rey Comeau, (captain) Keith McCreary, Larry Romanchych and Bob Leiter. Despite its inexperience as a team, the Flames were quite successful in the beginning of their rookie season, posting a 20–19–8 record by January 19, 1973, off the success of their young goaltending tandem. However, they lost 19 of their last 31 games, finishing out of the playoffs. Part of the problem was that in defiance of all geographic reality, the Flames were placed in the West Division—saddling them with some of the longest road trips in the league—and ultimately, the team's defense and goaltending were sabotaged by its lack of goalscoring, finishing second worst in the NHL in that category. However, their 65 points were 35 better than the Islanders, who toiled at the bottom of the East Division.

=== Season standings ===
West Division
		GP	W	L	T	GF	GA	DIFF	Pts
1	Chicago Black Hawks	78	42	27	9	284	225	+59	93
2	Philadelphia Flyers	78	37	30	11	296	256	+40	85
3	Minnesota North Stars	78	37	30	11	254	230	+24	85
4	St. Louis Blues	78	32	34	12	233	251	−18	76
5	Pittsburgh Penguins	78	32	37	9	257	265	−8	73
6	Los Angeles Kings	78	31	36	11	232	245	−13	73
7	Atlanta Flames	78	25	38	15	191	239	−48	65
8	California Golden Seals	78	16	46	16	213	323	−110	48

=== Record vs. opponents ===
==== Vs. West Division ====
1972–73 NHL records
Team	ATL	CAL	CHI	LAK	MIN	PHI	PIT	STL	Total
Atlanta	—	3–1–1	2–4	1–1–3	3–3	1–3–1	1–4	0–3–3	11–19–8
California	1–3–1	—	0–3–2	2–4	1–4	1–3–2	2–2–2	1–3–1	8–22–8
Chicago	4–2	3–0–2	—	2–3	3–2–1	2–2–1	2–3	3–3	19–15–4
Los Angeles	1–1–3	4–2	3–2	—	0–3–2	4–2	2–4	3–2	17–16–5
Minnesota	3–3	4–1	2–3–1	3–0–2	—	2–3	3–2	2–2–2	19–14–5
Philadelphia	3–1–1	3–1–2	2–2–1	2–4	3–2	—	4–2	3–1–1	20–13–5
Pittsburgh	4–1	2–2–2	3–2	4–2	2–3	2–4	—	3–2	20–16–2
St. Louis	3–0–3	3–1–1	3–3	2–3	2–2–2	1–3–1	2–3	—	16–15–7

==== Vs. East Division ====
1972–73 NHL records
Team	BOS	BUF	DET	MTL	NYI	NYR	TOR	VAN	Total
Atlanta	0–5	1–2–2	2–3	0–3–2	4–0–1	1–4	2–1–2	4–1	14–19–7
California	0–4–1	2–1–2	2–2–1	0–3–2	1–4	1–3–1	1–3–1	1–4	8–24–8
Chicago	3–2	3–2	3–2	3–2	4–0–1	2–2–1	2–1–2	3–1–1	23–12–5
Los Angeles	2–3	1–2–2	2–2–1	0–4–1	4–1	0–3–2	2–3	3–2	14–20–6
Minnesota	1–3–1	2–3	3–1–1	1–3–1	4–1	2–3	2–2–1	3–0–2	18–16–6
Philadelphia	0–4–1	3–2	1–3–1	2–2–1	4–1	0–4–1	3–1–1	4–0–1	17–17–6
Pittsburgh	1–4	0–3–2	0–2–3	0–5	4–0–1	2–3	2–2–1	3–2	12–21–7
St. Louis	3–2	1–2–2	3–2	0–3–2	3–1–1	0–5	2–3	4–1	16–19–5

== Schedule and results ==
1972–73 regular season
October

Game	Result	Date	Score	Opponent	Record	Attendance
1	W	October 7, 1972	3–2	@ New York Islanders (1972–73)	1–0–0	12,221
2	L	October 8, 1972	3–5	@ Buffalo Sabres (1972–73)	1–1–0	15,508
3	L	October 11, 1972	1–4	@ Chicago Black Hawks (1972–73)	1–2–0	N/A
4	L	October 12, 1972	0–3	@ Montreal Canadiens (1972–73)	1–3–0	16,002
5	T	October 14, 1972	1–1	Buffalo Sabres (1972–73)	1–3–1	14,568
6	L	October 18, 1972	0–6	Minnesota North Stars (1972–73)	1–4–1	8,852
7	W	October 21, 1972	3–2	@ Minnesota North Stars (1972–73)	2–4–1	15,229
8	L	October 22, 1972	2–7	@ Buffalo Sabres (1972–73)	2–5–1	15,516
9	W	October 25, 1972	4–3	@ California Golden Seals (1972–73)	3–5–1	1,998
10	L	October 26, 1972	1–3	@ Los Angeles Kings (1972–73)	3–6–1	6,155
11	W	October 28, 1972	2–1	@ Vancouver Canucks (1972–73)	4–6–1	15,570

November

Game	Result	Date	Score	Opponent	Record	Attendance
12	W	November 1, 1972	4–2	@ Detroit Red Wings (1972–73)	5–6–1	11,344
13	L	November 2, 1972	1–6	Montreal Canadiens (1972–73)	5–7–1	12,280
14	T	November 5, 1972	2–2	Toronto Maple Leafs (1972–73)	5–7–2	10,732
15	T	November 8, 1972	3–3	Los Angeles Kings (1972–73)	5–7–3	9,073
16	W	November 10, 1972	5–1	Minnesota North Stars (1972–73)	6–7–3	12,066
17	W	November 12, 1972	3–1	Vancouver Canucks (1972–73)	7–7–3	10,486
18	L	November 15, 1972	1–2	@ Toronto Maple Leafs (1972–73)	7–8–3	16,381
19	W	November 16, 1972	4–0	New York Islanders (1972–73)	8–8–3	9,820
20	L	November 18, 1972	1–6	@ Pittsburgh Penguins (1972–73)	8–9–3	10,959
21	W	November 19, 1972	3–2	Philadelphia Flyers (1972–73)	9–9–3	9,972
22	L	November 21, 1972	1–3	New York Rangers (1972–73)	9–10–3	11,505
23	L	November 24, 1972	0–4	Boston Bruins (1972–73)	9–11–3	15,078
24	W	November 26, 1972	6–2	Pittsburgh Penguins (1972–73)	10–11–3	9,041
25	L	November 29, 1972	0–5	@ Minnesota North Stars (1972–73)	10–12–3	15,125
26	T	November 30, 1972	5–5	@ Philadelphia Flyers (1972–73)	10–12–4	14,221

December

Game	Result	Date	Score	Opponent	Record	Attendance
27	T	December 2, 1972	4–4	@ Montreal Canadiens (1972–73)	10–12–5	16,455
28	L	December 3, 1972	2–3	@ New York Rangers (1972–73)	10–13–5	17,500
29	W	December 7, 1972	5–2	Vancouver Canucks (1972–73)	11–13–5	11,018
30	L	December 9, 1972	1–2	@ St. Louis Blues (1972–73)	11–14–5	18,425
31	L	December 10, 1972	4–5	St. Louis Blues (1972–73)	11–15–5	11,140
32	W	December 13, 1972	2–0	@ Detroit Red Wings (1972–73)	12–15–5	11,044
33	L	December 16, 1972	3–5	@ Pittsburgh Penguins (1972–73)	12–16–5	11,095
34	W	December 17, 1972	4–0	New York Islanders (1972–73)	13–16–5	10,117
35	W	December 20, 1972	5–3	Toronto Maple Leafs (1972–73)	14–16–5	12,590
36	W	December 21, 1972	5–2	@ New York Rangers (1972–73)	15–16–5	17,500
37	L	December 23, 1972	1–3	@ Boston Bruins (1972–73)	15–17–5	15,003
38	L	December 27, 1972	1–3	Boston Bruins (1972–73)	15–18–5	15,078
39	T	December 30, 1972	1–1	@ Montreal Canadiens (1972–73)	15–18–6	17,024

January

Game	Result	Date	Score	Opponent	Record	Attendance
40	W	January 2, 1973	6–1	@ New York Islanders (1972–73)	16–18–6	10,042
41	L	January 3, 1973	1–3	Philadelphia Flyers (1972–73)	16–19–6	11,144
42	T	January 6, 1973	2–2	@ St. Louis Blues (1972–73)	16–19–7	19,065
43	W	January 7, 1973	5–2	Vancouver Canucks (1972–73)	17–19–7	9,206
44	W	January 10, 1973	5–2	Chicago Black Hawks (1972–73)	18–19–7	11,829
45	W	January 12, 1973	1–0	Toronto Maple Leafs (1972–73)	19–19–7	15,078
46	W	January 14, 1973	4–1	Los Angeles Kings (1972–73)	20–19–7	11,194
47	T	January 17, 1973	3–3	@ St. Louis Blues (1972–73)	20–19–8	18,181
48	L	January 19, 1973	1–2	St. Louis Blues (1972–73)	20–20–8	15,078
49	L	January 21, 1973	2–3	Montreal Canadiens (1972–73)	20–21–8	15,078
50	L	January 24, 1973	2–5	California Golden Seals (1972–73)	20–22–8	11,222
51	T	January 26, 1973	3–3	Los Angeles Kings (1972–73)	20–22–9	15,078
52	W	January 28, 1973	8–5	@ Buffalo Sabres (1972–73)	21–22–9	15,668

February

Game	Result	Date	Score	Opponent	Record	Attendance
53	W	February 1, 1973	3–1	Minnesota North Stars (1972–73)	22–22–9	14,169
54	L	February 3, 1973	0–1	@ Detroit Red Wings (1972–73)	22–23–9	12,862
55	L	February 4, 1973	0–6	@ New York Rangers (1972–73)	22–24–9	17,500
56	L	February 7, 1973	3–5	Detroit Red Wings (1972–73)	22–25–9	13,186
57	L	February 9, 1973	3–4	Chicago Black Hawks (1972–73)	22–26–9	15,078
58	W	February 11, 1973	3–1	California Golden Seals (1972–73)	23–26–9	13,422
59	T	February 14, 1973	3–3	@ California Golden Seals (1972–73)	23–26–10	3,829
60	L	February 16, 1973	0–5	@ Vancouver Canucks (1972–73)	23–27–10	15,570
61	T	February 17, 1973	3–3	@ Los Angeles Kings (1972–73)	23–27–11	11,108
62	T	February 21, 1973	2–2	@ Toronto Maple Leafs (1972–73)	23–27–12	16,352
63	L	February 25, 1973	2–4	@ Chicago Black Hawks (1972–73)	23–28–12	N/A

March

Game	Result	Date	Score	Opponent	Record	Attendance
64	T	March 1, 1973	4–4	Buffalo Sabres (1972–73)	23–28–13	12,730
65	L	March 3, 1973	0–3	@ Minnesota North Stars (1972–73)	23–29–13	15,512
66	W	March 4, 1973	3–2	California Golden Seals (1972–73)	24–29–13	11,565
67	L	March 7, 1973	2–5	Detroit Red Wings (1972–73)	24–30–13	12,632
68	L	March 9, 1973	2–3	Boston Bruins (1972–73)	24–31–13	15,078
69	L	March 10, 1973	1–2	@ Philadelphia Flyers (1972–73)	24–32–13	16,600
70	T	March 14, 1973	1–1	St. Louis Blues (1972–73)	24–32–14	15,078
71	W	March 17, 1973	3–2	Chicago Black Hawks (1972–73)	25–32–14	15,078
72	L	March 18, 1973	1–7	@ Boston Bruins (1972–73)	25–33–14	15,003
73	L	March 22, 1973	1–4	New York Rangers (1972–73)	25–34–14	15,078
74	L	March 24, 1973	0–7	@ Chicago Black Hawks (1972–73)	25–35–14	N/A
75	L	March 25, 1973	2–4	Pittsburgh Penguins (1972–73)	25–36–14	13,200
76	L	March 28, 1973	3–6	@ Pittsburgh Penguins (1972–73)	25–37–14	10,081
77	L	March 29, 1973	2–4	@ Philadelphia Flyers (1972–73)	25–38–14	16,600

April

Game	Result	Date	Score	Opponent	Record	Attendance
78	T	April 1, 1973	4–4	New York Islanders (1972–73)	25–38–15	13,592

Legend: Win (2 points) Loss (0 points) Tie (1 point)

== Player statistics ==
=== Skaters ===
Note: GP = Games played; G = Goals; A = Assists; Pts = Points; PIM = Penalty minutes

		Regular season					Playoffs
Player	#	GP	G	A	Pts	PIM	GP	G	A	Pts	PIM
Bob Leiter	16	78	26	34	60	19	–	–	–	–	-
Larry Romanchych	21	70	18	30	48	39	–	–	–	–	-
Rey Comeau	18	77	21	21	42	19	–	–	–	–	-
Keith McCreary	9	77	20	21	41	21	–	–	–	–	-
Ernie Hicke^{‡}	12	58	14	23	37	37	–	–	–	–	-
Curt Bennett^{†}	5	52	18	17	35	9	–	–	–	–	-
Randy Manery	7	78	5	30	35	44	–	–	–	–	-
John Stewart	17	68	17	17	34	30	–	–	–	–	-
Jacques Richard	15	74	13	18	31	32	–	–	–	–	-
Leon Rochefort^{†}	11	54	9	18	27	10	–	–	–	–	-
Bill MacMillan	20	78	10	15	25	52	–	–	–	–	-
Pat Quinn	3	78	2	18	20	113	–	–	–	–	-
Lew Morrison	8	77	6	9	15	19	–	–	–	–	-
Noel Price	4	54	1	13	14	38	–	–	–	–	-
Bill Plager	2	76	2	11	13	92	–	–	–	–	-
Noel Picard^{†}	22	41	0	10	10	43	–	–	–	–	-
Norm Gratton^{‡}	10	29	3	6	9	12	–	–	–	–	-
Bob Paradise	6	71	1	7	8	103	–	–	–	–	-
Ron Harris^{‡}	5	24	2	4	6	8	–	–	–	–	-
Morris Stefaniw	19	13	1	1	2	2	–	–	–	–	-
Kerry Ketter	24	41	0	2	2	58	–	–	–	–	-
Arnie Brown^{†}	19	15	1	0	1	17	–	–	–	–	-
Butch Deadmarsh^{†}	10	19	1	0	1	8	–	–	–	–	-
Dan Bouchard	30	34	0	1	1	12	–	–	–	–	-
Phil Myre	1	46	0	1	1	5	–	–	–	–	-
Bill Hogaboam^{‡}	11	2	0	0	0	0	–	–	–	–	-

^{†}Denotes player spent time with another team before joining Atlanta. Stats reflect time with the Flames only. ^{‡}Traded mid-season

=== Goaltending ===
Note: GP = Games played; TOI = Time on ice (minutes); W = Wins; L = Losses; OT = Overtime/shootout losses; GA = Goals against; SO = Shutouts; GAA = Goals against average

		Regular season								Playoffs
Player	#	GP	TOI	W	L	T	GA	SO	GAA	GP	TOI	W	L	GA	SO	GAA
Phil Myre	1	46	2736	16	23	5	138	2	3.03	–	–	–	–	–	–	-.--
Dan Bouchard	30	34	1944	9	15	10	100	2	3.09	–	–	–	–	–	–	-.--

== Transactions ==
The Flames were involved in the following transactions during the 1972–73 season.

=== Trades ===
June, 1972	To: Atlanta Flames Ted Tucker	To: Montreal Canadiens cash
June, 1972	To: Atlanta Flames Bill Hogaboam	To: New York Rangers Bill Heindl Jr.
October, 1972	To: Atlanta Flames Brian McKenzie	To: Pittsburgh Penguins cash
November 28, 1972	To: Atlanta Flames Leon Rochefort	To: Detroit Red Wings Bill Hogaboam
November 29, 1972	To: Atlanta Flames Curt Bennett	To: New York Rangers Ron Harris
February 13, 1973	To: Atlanta Flames Arnie Brown	To: New York Islanders Ernie Hicke future considerations (Bill MacMillan; May 29, 1973)
February 14, 1973	To: Atlanta Flames Butch Deadmarsh	To: Buffalo Sabres Norm Gratton

=== Free agents ===
Player / Former team; D Ed Kea / St. Petersburg Suns (EHL)	Player / New team

=== Claimed off waivers ===
Player	Former team
D Noel Picard	St. Louis Blues
