= 1972–73 Los Angeles Kings season =

National Hockey League team season

1972–73 Los Angeles Kings
- Division: 6th West
- 1972–73 record: 31–36–11
- Home record: 21–11–7
- Road record: 10–25–4
- Goals for: 232
- Goals against: 245

Team information
- General manager: Larry Regan
- Coach: Bob Pulford
- Captain: Vacant
- Alternate captains: Ralph Backstrom; Harry Howell; Juha Widing; Gilles Marotte
- Arena: Los Angeles Forum

Team leaders
- Goals: Mike Corrigan (37)
- Assists: Juha Widing (54)
- Points: Joha Widing (70)
- Penalty minutes: Mike Corrigan (146)
- Wins: Rogie Vachon (22)
- Goals against average: Rogie Vachon (2.85)

The 1972–73 Los Angeles Kings season was the Kings' sixth season in the National Hockey League (NHL). The team did not qualify for the playoffs and finished in sixth place out of eight teams in the West Division, only three points behind fourth place, the final playoff position. Kings' captain Bob Pulford retired from play before the season and took over as the Kings' head coach.

== Regular season ==
Bob Pulford became full-time head coach and instituted a disciplined defense oriented system. Consequently, the Kings allowed 60 fewer goals than in 1971–72. Their penalty killing, once the worst in the NHL, was led by Jimmy Peters and Real Lemieux and was the best in the league. Offensively, the Kings were led by "The Hot Line", which consisted of Juha Widing, Bob Berry, and Mike Corrigan; they combined for 89 goals and 112 assists.

After starting 1–6, the Kings went on a club record 8-game winning streak. But from early January through February, they endured a 4–13–5 stretch that saw them fall from 4th to 7th place. They got hot again in March, going 6–4–2 to get within 2 points of the 4th place St. Louis Blues, who held the final playoff spot with 3 games to play. But L.A. suffered two straight disastrous losses to the last place California Golden Seals, and fell to 6th, missing the playoffs by 3 points.

== Final standings ==
West Division
| | | GP | W | L | T | GF | GA | DIFF | Pts |
|---|---|---|---|---|---|---|---|---|---|
| 1 | Chicago Black Hawks | 78 | 42 | 27 | 9 | 284 | 225 | +59 | 93 |
| 2 | Philadelphia Flyers | 78 | 37 | 30 | 11 | 296 | 256 | +40 | 85 |
| 3 | Minnesota North Stars | 78 | 37 | 30 | 11 | 254 | 230 | +24 | 85 |
| 4 | St. Louis Blues | 78 | 32 | 34 | 12 | 233 | 251 | −18 | 76 |
| 5 | Pittsburgh Penguins | 78 | 32 | 37 | 9 | 257 | 265 | −8 | 73 |
| 6 | Los Angeles Kings | 78 | 31 | 36 | 11 | 232 | 245 | −13 | 73 |
| 7 | Atlanta Flames | 78 | 25 | 38 | 15 | 191 | 239 | −48 | 65 |
| 8 | California Golden Seals | 78 | 16 | 46 | 16 | 213 | 323 | −110 | 48 |

== Record vs. opponents ==
==== Vs. West Division ====
1972–73 NHL records
| Team | ATL | CAL | CHI | LAK | MIN | PHI | PIT | STL | Total |
|---|---|---|---|---|---|---|---|---|---|
| Atlanta | — | 3–1–1 | 2–4 | 1–1–3 | 3–3 | 1–3–1 | 1–4 | 0–3–3 | 11–19–8 |
| California | 1–3–1 | — | 0–3–2 | 2–4 | 1–4 | 1–3–2 | 2–2–2 | 1–3–1 | 8–22–8 |
| Chicago | 4–2 | 3–0–2 | — | 2–3 | 3–2–1 | 2–2–1 | 2–3 | 3–3 | 19–15–4 |
| Los Angeles | 1–1–3 | 4–2 | 3–2 | — | 0–3–2 | 4–2 | 2–4 | 3–2 | 17–16–5 |
| Minnesota | 3–3 | 4–1 | 2–3–1 | 3–0–2 | — | 2–3 | 3–2 | 2–2–2 | 19–14–5 |
| Philadelphia | 3–1–1 | 3–1–2 | 2–2–1 | 2–4 | 3–2 | — | 4–2 | 3–1–1 | 20–13–5 |
| Pittsburgh | 4–1 | 2–2–2 | 3–2 | 4–2 | 2–3 | 2–4 | — | 3–2 | 20–16–2 |
| St. Louis | 3–0–3 | 3–1–1 | 3–3 | 2–3 | 2–2–2 | 1–3–1 | 2–3 | — | 16–15–7 |

==== Vs. East Division ====
1972–73 NHL records
| Team | BOS | BUF | DET | MTL | NYI | NYR | TOR | VAN | Total |
|---|---|---|---|---|---|---|---|---|---|
| Atlanta | 0–5 | 1–2–2 | 2–3 | 0–3–2 | 4–0–1 | 1–4 | 2–1–2 | 4–1 | 14–19–7 |
| California | 0–4–1 | 2–1–2 | 2–2–1 | 0–3–2 | 1–4 | 1–3–1 | 1–3–1 | 1–4 | 8–24–8 |
| Chicago | 3–2 | 3–2 | 3–2 | 3–2 | 4–0–1 | 2–2–1 | 2–1–2 | 3–1–1 | 23–12–5 |
| Los Angeles | 2–3 | 1–2–2 | 2–2–1 | 0–4–1 | 4–1 | 0–3–2 | 2–3 | 3–2 | 14–20–6 |
| Minnesota | 1–3–1 | 2–3 | 3–1–1 | 1–3–1 | 4–1 | 2–3 | 2–2–1 | 3–0–2 | 18–16–6 |
| Philadelphia | 0–4–1 | 3–2 | 1–3–1 | 2–2–1 | 4–1 | 0–4–1 | 3–1–1 | 4–0–1 | 17–17–6 |
| Pittsburgh | 1–4 | 0–3–2 | 0–2–3 | 0–5 | 4–0–1 | 2–3 | 2–2–1 | 3–2 | 12–21–7 |
| St. Louis | 3–2 | 1–2–2 | 3–2 | 0–3–2 | 3–1–1 | 0–5 | 2–3 | 4–1 | 16–19–5 |

== Schedule and results ==
1972–73 regular season
October

| Game | Result | Date | Score | Opponent | Record |
|---|---|---|---|---|---|
| 1 | L | October 7, 1972 | 2–4 | @ Pittsburgh Penguins (1972–73) | 0–1–0 |
| 2 | W | October 8, 1972 | 4–2 | @ Boston Bruins (1972–73) | 1–1–0 |
| 3 | L | October 11, 1972 | 3–7 | @ Buffalo Sabres (1972–73) | 1–2–0 |
| 4 | L | October 12, 1972 | 2–3 | @ New York Islanders (1972–73) | 1–3–0 |
| 5 | L | October 14, 1972 | 4–6 | @ Toronto Maple Leafs (1972–73) | 1–4–0 |
| 6 | L | October 15, 1972 | 2–8 | @ Detroit Red Wings (1972–73) | 1–5–0 |
| 7 | L | October 18, 1972 | 3–4 | Philadelphia Flyers (1972–73) | 1–6–0 |
| 8 | W | October 21, 1972 | 3–1 | Chicago Black Hawks (1972–73) | 2–6–0 |
| 9 | W | October 24, 1972 | 5–0 | California Golden Seals (1972–73) | 3–6–0 |
| 10 | W | October 26, 1972 | 3–1 | Atlanta Flames (1972–73) | 4–6–0 |
| 11 | W | October 28, 1972 | 5–2 | Pittsburgh Penguins (1972–73) | 5–6–0 |
| 12 | W | October 31, 1972 | 4–1 | Vancouver Canucks (1972–73) | 6–6–0 |

November

| Game | Result | Date | Score | Opponent | Record |
|---|---|---|---|---|---|
| 13 | W | November 2, 1972 | 5–2 | Boston Bruins (1972–73) | 7–6–0 |
| 14 | W | November 4, 1972 | 9–2 | New York Islanders (1972–73) | 8–6–0 |
| 15 | W | November 7, 1972 | 3–2 | @ St. Louis Blues (1972–73) | 9–6–0 |
| 16 | T | November 8, 1972 | 3–3 | @ Atlanta Flames (1972–73) | 9–6–1 |
| 17 | L | November 11, 1972 | 2–5 | @ Montreal Canadiens (1972–73) | 9–7–1 |
| 18 | L | November 12, 1972 | 1–5 | @ New York Rangers (1972–73) | 9–8–1 |
| 19 | L | November 14, 1972 | 1–4 | @ Minnesota North Stars (1972–73) | 9–9–1 |
| 20 | T | November 15, 1972 | 3–3 | Buffalo Sabres (1972–73) | 9–9–2 |
| 21 | L | November 17, 1972 | 4–8 | @ Vancouver Canucks (1972–73) | 9–10–2 |
| 22 | W | November 18, 1972 | 8–3 | Detroit Red Wings (1972–73) | 10–10–2 |
| 23 | T | November 22, 1972 | 3–3 | Montreal Canadiens (1972–73) | 10–10–3 |
| 24 | L | November 25, 1972 | 0–3 | Minnesota North Stars (1972–73) | 10–11–3 |
| 25 | T | November 29, 1972 | 2–2 | New York Rangers (1972–73) | 10–11–4 |

December

| Game | Result | Date | Score | Opponent | Record |
|---|---|---|---|---|---|
| 26 | W | December 2, 1972 | 3–2 | St. Louis Blues (1972–73) | 11–11–4 |
| 27 | W | December 5, 1972 | 6–1 | @ New York Islanders (1972–73) | 12–11–4 |
| 28 | L | December 6, 1972 | 0–6 | @ Chicago Black Hawks (1972–73) | 12–12–4 |
| 29 | W | December 9, 1972 | 3–1 | Pittsburgh Penguins (1972–73) | 13–12–4 |
| 30 | W | December 13, 1972 | 3–1 | Chicago Black Hawks (1972–73) | 14–12–4 |
| 31 | L | December 16, 1972 | 1–3 | Montreal Canadiens (1972–73) | 14–13–4 |
| 32 | L | December 17, 1972 | 0–2 | @ Chicago Black Hawks (1972–73) | 14–14–4 |
| 33 | L | December 20, 1972 | 1–4 | @ Detroit Red Wings (1972–73) | 14–15–4 |
| 34 | L | December 21, 1972 | 3–6 | @ Philadelphia Flyers (1972–73) | 14–16–4 |
| 35 | W | December 23, 1972 | 2–0 | Buffalo Sabres (1972–73) | 15–16–4 |
| 36 | W | December 24, 1972 | 5–3 | @ California Golden Seals (1972–73) | 16–16–4 |
| 37 | W | December 27, 1972 | 4–1 | New York Islanders (1972–73) | 17–16–4 |
| 38 | W | December 30, 1972 | 5–3 | Philadelphia Flyers (1972–73) | 18–16–4 |

January

| Game | Result | Date | Score | Opponent | Record |
|---|---|---|---|---|---|
| 39 | L | January 3, 1973 | 0–3 | @ New York Rangers (1972–73) | 18–17–4 |
| 40 | L | January 6, 1973 | 2–4 | @ Toronto Maple Leafs (1972–73) | 18–18–4 |
| 41 | W | January 9, 1973 | 3–2 | @ New York Islanders (1972–73) | 19–18–4 |
| 42 | W | January 11, 1973 | 3–2 | @ Philadelphia Flyers (1972–73) | 20–18–4 |
| 43 | L | January 13, 1973 | 1–3 | @ Pittsburgh Penguins (1972–73) | 20–19–4 |
| 44 | L | January 14, 1973 | 1–4 | @ Atlanta Flames (1972–73) | 20–20–4 |
| 45 | T | January 17, 1973 | 4–4 | New York Rangers (1972–73) | 20–20–5 |
| 46 | W | January 19, 1973 | 4–0 | @ Vancouver Canucks (1972–73) | 21–20–5 |
| 47 | L | January 20, 1973 | 2–6 | Toronto Maple Leafs (1972–73) | 21–21–5 |
| 48 | T | January 23, 1973 | 5–5 | @ Minnesota North Stars (1972–73) | 21–21–6 |
| 49 | L | January 24, 1973 | 5–7 | St. Louis Blues (1972–73) | 21–22–6 |
| 50 | T | January 26, 1973 | 3–3 | @ Atlanta Flames (1972–73) | 21–22–7 |
| 51 | L | January 28, 1973 | 5–6 | @ Boston Bruins (1972–73) | 21–23–7 |
| 52 | L | January 31, 1973 | 1–4 | @ Pittsburgh Penguins (1972–73) | 21–24–7 |

February

| Game | Result | Date | Score | Opponent | Record |
|---|---|---|---|---|---|
| 53 | L | February 1, 1973 | 3–5 | @ Buffalo Sabres (1972–73) | 21–25–7 |
| 54 | L | February 3, 1973 | 1–7 | Montreal Canadiens (1972–73) | 21–26–7 |
| 55 | W | February 7, 1973 | 2–1 | Philadelphia Flyers (1972–73) | 22–26–7 |
| 56 | W | February 10, 1973 | 4–2 | @ Toronto Maple Leafs (1972–73) | 23–26–7 |
| 57 | L | February 11, 1973 | 0–2 | @ Boston Bruins (1972–73) | 23–27–7 |
| 58 | L | February 13, 1973 | 2–4 | @ St. Louis Blues (1972–73) | 23–28–7 |
| 59 | T | February 14, 1973 | 2–2 | Detroit Red Wings (1972–73) | 23–28–8 |
| 60 | T | February 17, 1973 | 3–3 | Atlanta Flames (1972–73) | 23–28–9 |
| 61 | W | February 18, 1973 | 4–2 | @ California Golden Seals (1972–73) | 24–28–9 |
| 62 | L | February 21, 1973 | 3–4 | New York Rangers (1972–73) | 24–29–9 |
| 63 | L | February 24, 1973 | 5–7 | Boston Bruins (1972–73) | 24–30–9 |
| 64 | L | February 28, 1973 | 2–5 | @ Montreal Canadiens (1972–73) | 24–31–9 |

March

| Game | Result | Date | Score | Opponent | Record |
|---|---|---|---|---|---|
| 65 | W | March 1, 1973 | 2–0 | @ Philadelphia Flyers (1972–73) | 25–31–9 |
| 66 | W | March 3, 1973 | 2–0 | St. Louis Blues (1972–73) | 26–31–9 |
| 67 | T | March 6, 1973 | 2–2 | Buffalo Sabres (1972–73) | 26–31–10 |
| 68 | W | March 8, 1973 | 4–1 | Chicago Black Hawks (1972–73) | 27–31–10 |
| 69 | W | March 10, 1973 | 4–2 | California Golden Seals (1972–73) | 28–31–10 |
| 70 | T | March 13, 1973 | 2–2 | @ Minnesota North Stars (1972–73) | 28–31–11 |
| 71 | L | March 14, 1973 | 2–3 | Pittsburgh Penguins (1972–73) | 28–32–11 |
| 72 | L | March 16, 1973 | 2–4 | @ Vancouver Canucks (1972–73) | 28–33–11 |
| 73 | L | March 17, 1973 | 3–4 | Minnesota North Stars (1972–73) | 28–34–11 |
| 74 | W | March 21, 1973 | 5–1 | Toronto Maple Leafs (1972–73) | 29–34–11 |
| 75 | W | March 24, 1973 | 5–3 | Detroit Red Wings (1972–73) | 30–34–11 |
| 76 | L | March 28, 1973 | 2–3 | California Golden Seals (1972–73) | 30–35–11 |
| 77 | L | March 30, 1973 | 1–3 | @ California Golden Seals (1972–73) | 30–36–11 |
| 78 | W | March 31, 1973 | 6–3 | Vancouver Canucks (1972–73) | 31–36–11 |

Legend: Win (2 points) Loss (0 points) Tie (1 point)

== Player statistics ==
Bob Pulford became full-time head coach and instituted a disciplined defense oriented system. Consequently, the Kings allowed 60 fewer goals than in 1971–72. Their penalty killing, once the worst in the NHL, was led by Jimmy Peters and Real Lemieux and was the best in the league. Offensively, the Kings were led by "The Hot Line", which consisted of Juha Widing, Bob Berry, and Mike Corrigan; they combined for 89 goals and 112 assists.

== Awards and records ==
None in 1972–73 season.

== Transactions ==
The Kings were involved in the following transactions during the 1972–73 season.

=== Trades ===
| June 6, 1972 | To Los Angeles Kings Flames promise not to select certain players in expansion draft | To Atlanta Flames 9th round pick in 1972 – Jean Lamarre; 10th round pick in 1973 – Guy Ross |
| June 8, 1972 | To Los Angeles Kings Cash | To Minnesota North Stars 8th round pick in 1972 – Scott MacPhail; 9th round pick in 1972 – Steve Lyon |
| August 22, 1972 | To Los Angeles Kings Terry Harper | To Montreal Canadiens 2nd round pick in 1974 – Gary MacGregor; 1st round pick in 1975 – Pierre Mondou; 3rd round pick in 1975 – Paul Woods; 1st round pick in 1976 – Rod Schutt |
| December 15, 1972 | To Los Angeles Kings John Van Horlick | To Portland Buckaroos (WHL) Jim Stanfield; Mike Keeler; Glen Toner |
| January 22, 1973 | To Los Angeles Kings Frank St. Marseille | To St. Louis Blues Paul Curtis |
| February 26, 1973 | To Los Angeles Kings Dan Maloney | To Chicago Black Hawks Ralph Backstrom |

=== Free agent signings ===
| October 2, 1972 | From University of British Columbia (WUAA) Doug Buhr |

=== Free agents lost ===
| June 6, 1972 | To Alberta Oilers (WHA) Doug Barrie |
| June 6, 1972 | To Alberta Oilers (WHA) Roger Cote |
| August 15, 1972 | To Chicago Cougars (WHA) Larry Cahan |

=== Reverse Draft ===
| June 1, 1972 | To San Diego Gulls (WHL) Howie Hughes |

=== Intra-league Draft ===
| June 5, 1972 | To Los Angeles Kings Barry Long | To Chicago Black Hawks Bill Orban |
| June 5, 1972 | To Los Angeles Kings Doug Volmar | To Detroit Red Wings $40,000 |

=== Expansion Draft ===
| June 6, 1972 | To New York Islanders Bill Mikkelson; Billy Smith |
| June 6, 1972 | To Atlanta Flames Lucien Grenier |

== Draft picks ==
Los Angeles's draft picks at the 1972 NHL amateur draft held at the Queen Elizabeth Hotel in Montreal.

| Round | # | Player | Nationality | College/Junior/Club team (League) |
|---|---|---|---|---|
| 2 | 20 | Don Kozak | Canada | Edmonton Oil Kings (WCHL) |
| 3 | 36 | Dave Hutchison | Canada | London Knights (OMJHL) |
| 4 | 52 | John Dobie | Canada | Regina Pats (WCHL) |
| 5 | 68 | Bernie Germain | Canada | Regina Pats (WCHL) |
| 6 | 84 | Mike Usitalo | United States | Michigan Tech University (WCHA) |
| 7 | 100 | Glen Toner | Canada | Regina Pats (WCHL) |

== See also ==
- 1972–73 NHL season
