= 1972–73 New York Islanders season =

NHL hockey team season (inaugural season)

1972–73 New York Islanders
- Division: 8th East
- 1972–73 record: 12–60–6
- Home record: 10–25–4
- Road record: 2–35–2
- Goals for: 170
- Goals against: 347

Team information
- General manager: Bill Torrey
- Coach: Earl Ingarfield; Phil Goyette
- Captain: Ed Westfall
- Alternate captains: Germain Gagnon; Brian Spencer
- Arena: Nassau Coliseum

Team leaders
- Goals: Billy Harris (28)
- Assists: Ed Westfall (31)
- Points: Billy Harris (50)
- Penalty minutes: Gerry Hart (158)
- Wins: Billy Smith (7)
- Goals against average: Billy Smith (4.16)

The 1972–73 New York Islanders season was the first season in the franchise's history. At the beginning of 1972, Gordie Howe was offered the job as first head coach of the New York Islanders, but turned it down. The Islanders were coached by Phil Goyette (6–38–4) and Earl Ingarfield (6–22–2). Overall, the team finished in last place with a 12–60–6 record, unable to qualify for the playoffs.

== Offseason ==
=== NHL draft ===
Round	Pick	Player	Nationality	College/junior/club team
1	1	Billy Harris	Canada	Toronto Marlboros (OHA)
2	17	Lorne Henning	Canada	New Westminster Bruins (WCHL)
3	33	Bob Nystrom	Canada	Calgary Centennials (WCHL)
4	49	Ron Smith	Canada	Cornwall Royals (QMJHL)
5	65	Richard Grenier	Canada	Verdun Eperviers (QMJHL)
6	81	Derek Black	Canada	Calgary Centennials (WCHL)
7	97	Richard Brodeur	Canada	Cornwall Royals (QMJHL)
7	101	Don McLaughlin	Canada	Brandon Wheat Kings (WCHL)
8	113	Derek Kuntz	Canada	Medicine Hat Tigers (WCHL)
8	117	Rene Levasseur	Canada	Shawinigan Dynamos (QMJHL)
9	129	Yvon Rolando	Canada	Drummondville Rangers (QMJHL)
9	133	Bill Ennos	Canada	Vancouver Nats (WCHL)
10	144	Garry Howatt	Canada	Flin Flon Bombers (WCHL)
10	146	Rene Lambert	Canada	St. Jerome Alouettes (QMJHL)

=== NHL Expansion Draft ===
Pick	Player	Drafted from	Drafted by
2	Gerry Desjardins (G)	Chicago Black Hawks	New York Islanders
4	Billy Smith (G)	Los Angeles Kings	New York Islanders
5	Bart Crashley (D)	Montreal Canadiens	New York Islanders
7	Dave Hudson (C)	Chicago Black Hawks	New York Islanders
9	Ed Westfall (RW)	Boston Bruins	New York Islanders
11	Garry Peters (C)	Boston Bruins	New York Islanders
13	Larry Hornung (D)	St. Louis Blues	New York Islanders
15	Bryan Lefley (D)	New York Rangers	New York Islanders
17	Brian Spencer (LW)	Toronto Maple Leafs	New York Islanders
19	Terry Crisp (C)	St. Louis Blues	New York Islanders
21	Ted Hampson (C)	Minnesota North Stars	New York Islanders
23	Gerry Hart (D)	Detroit Red Wings	New York Islanders
25	John Schella (D)	Vancouver Canucks	New York Islanders
27	Bill Mikkelson (D)	Los Angeles Kings	New York Islanders
29	Craig Cameron (RW)	Minnesota North Stars	New York Islanders
31	Tom Miller (C)	Toronto Maple Leafs	New York Islanders
33	Brian Marchinko (C)	Buffalo Sabres	New York Islanders
35	Ted Taylor (LW)	Vancouver Canucks	New York Islanders
37	Norm Ferguson (RW)	California Golden Seals	New York Islanders
39	Jim Mair (D)	Philadelphia Flyers	New York Islanders
41	Ken Murray (D)	Buffalo Sabres	New York Islanders

== Regular season ==
The New York Islanders' first logo

With the impending start of the World Hockey Association in the fall of 1972, the upstart league had plans to place its New York team in the brand-new Nassau Veterans Memorial Coliseum in Nassau County. However, Nassau County officials did not consider the WHA a professional league and wanted nothing to do with the upstart New York Raiders. The only legal way to keep the Raiders out of the Coliseum was to get an NHL team to play there, so William Shea, who had helped bring the New York Mets to the area a decade earlier, was pressed into service once again. Shea found a receptive ear in league president Clarence Campbell, who did not want the additional competition in the New York area. So, despite having expanded to 14 teams just two years before, the NHL hastily awarded a Long Island-based franchise to clothing manufacturer Roy Boe, owner of the American Basketball Association's New York Nets. A second expansion franchise was awarded to Atlanta (the Flames) at the same time to balance the schedule. The new team was widely expected to take the Long Island Ducks name used by an Eastern Hockey League franchise; the more geographically expansive "New York Islanders" came largely as a surprise.

The Islanders, who were soon nicknamed the Isles by the local newspapers, had an extra burden to pay in the form of a $4 million territorial fee to the nearby New York Rangers. True to their name, the New York Islanders officially represent New York (city and state), with their nickname and logo denoting their current arena location and fan heartbed; but their support has also naturally come from the boroughs, upstate, Connecticut, and elsewhere in the metro area.

While the Islanders secured veteran forward Ed Westfall from the Boston Bruins in the 1972 NHL expansion draft, junior league star Billy Harris in the 1972 NHL amateur draft, and a few other respectable players, several other draftees jumped to the WHA. Unlike most other expansion teams' general managers, Islanders' GM Bill Torrey didn't make many trades for veteran players in the early years. Rather than pursue a "win now" strategy of getting a few veterans to boost attendance (a tactic which proved disastrous for many teams in the long run), Torrey was committed to building through the draft.

In the team's first season, young players such as goaltender Billy Smith (the team's second pick in the expansion draft) and forwards Bob Nystrom and Lorne Henning were given chances to prove themselves in the NHL. However, this young and inexperienced expansion team posted a record of 12–60–6, one of the worst in NHL history. The lone highlight of the season came on January 18, when the lowly Islanders upset the defending Stanley Cup champion Boston Bruins on the road 9–7.

Phil Goyette was fired midway through the season, and replaced with Earl Ingarfield.

=== Final standings ===
East Division
		GP	W	L	T	GF	GA	DIFF	Pts
1	Montreal Canadiens	78	52	10	16	329	184	+145	120
2	Boston Bruins	78	51	22	5	330	235	+95	107
3	New York Rangers	78	47	23	8	297	208	+89	102
4	Buffalo Sabres	78	37	27	14	257	219	+38	88
5	Detroit Red Wings	78	37	29	12	265	243	+22	86
6	Toronto Maple Leafs	78	27	41	10	247	279	−32	64
7	Vancouver Canucks	78	22	47	9	233	339	−106	53
8	New York Islanders	78	12	60	6	170	347	−177	30

=== Record vs. opponents ===
==== Vs. East Division ====
1972–73 NHL records
Team	BOS	BUF	DET	MTL	NYI	NYR	TOR	VAN	Total
Boston	—	4–1–1	3–2	1–3–1	5–1	3–3	4–1	4–1	24–12–2
Buffalo	1–4–1	—	1–4	1–2–2	5–0–1	5–1	4–1	3–2	20–14–4
Detroit	2–3	4–1	—	2–3–1	4–1	1–3–1	4–2	3–0–3	20–13–5
Montreal	3–1–1	2–1–2	3–2–1	—	5–0	3–0–2	5–0–1	6–0	27–4–7
N.Y. Islanders	1–5	0–5–1	1–4	0–5	—	0–6	1–4	1–3–1	4–32–2
N.Y. Rangers	3–3	1–5	3–1–1	0–3–2	6–0	—	4–1	3–2	20–15–3
Toronto	1–4	1–4	2–4	0–5–1	4–1	1–4	—	2–3–1	11–25–2
Vancouver	1–4	2–3	0–3–3	0–6	3–1–1	2–3	3–2–1	—	11–22–5

==== Vs. West Division ====
1972–73 NHL records
Team	ATL	CAL	CHI	LAK	MIN	PHI	PIT	STL	Total
Boston	5–0	4–0–1	2–3	3–2	3–1–1	4–0–1	4–1	2–3	27–10–3
Buffalo	2–1–2	1–2–2	2–3	2–1–2	3–2	2–3	3–0–2	2–1–2	17–13–10
Detroit	3–2	2–2–1	2–3	2–2–1	1–3–1	3–1–1	2–0–3	2–3	17–16–7
Montreal	3–0–2	3–0–2	2–3	4–0–1	3–1–1	2–2–1	5–0	3–0–2	25–6–9
N.Y. Islanders	0–4–1	4–1	0–4–1	1–4	1–4	1–4	0–4–1	1–3–1	8–28–4
N.Y. Rangers	4–1	3–1–1	2–2–1	3–0–2	3–2	4–0–1	3–2	5–0	27–8–5
Toronto	1–2–2	3–1–1	1–2–2	3–2	2–2–1	1–3–1	2–2–1	3–2	16–16–8
Vancouver	1–4	4–1	1–3–1	2–3	0–3–2	0–4–1	2–3	1–4	11–25–4

== Schedule and results ==
1972–73 regular season
October

Game	Result	Date	Score	Opponent	Record
1	L	October 7, 1972	2–3	Atlanta Flames (1972–73)	0–1–0
2	W	October 12, 1972	3–2	Los Angeles Kings (1972–73)	1–1–0
3	L	October 14, 1972	4–7	Boston Bruins (1972–73)	1–2–0
4	L	October 17, 1972	0–5	Pittsburgh Penguins (1972–73)	1–3–0
5	L	October 21, 1972	1–2	New York Rangers (1972–73)	1–4–0
6	L	October 24, 1972	3–4	Montreal Canadiens (1972–73)	1–5–0
7	T	October 28, 1972	4–4	Chicago Black Hawks (1972–73)	1–5–1
8	L	October 29, 1972	1–9	@ Boston Bruins (1972–73)	1–6–1

November

Game	Result	Date	Score	Opponent	Record
9	W	November 1, 1972	6–2	@ California Golden Seals (1972–73)	2–6–1
10	L	November 3, 1972	2–7	@ Vancouver Canucks (1972–73)	2–7–1
11	L	November 4, 1972	2–9	@ Los Angeles Kings (1972–73)	2–8–1
12	L	November 8, 1972	1–6	@ Chicago Black Hawks (1972–73)	2–9–1
13	L	November 11, 1972	0–3	@ Minnesota North Stars (1972–73)	2–10–1
14	L	November 14, 1972	2–7	Montreal Canadiens (1972–73)	2–11–1
15	L	November 16, 1972	0–4	@ Atlanta Flames (1972–73)	2–12–1
16	L	November 18, 1972	3–7	Boston Bruins (1972–73)	2–13–1
17	W	November 21, 1972	4–2	California Golden Seals (1972–73)	3–13–1
18	L	November 22, 1972	3–5	@ Philadelphia Flyers (1972–73)	3–14–1
19	T	November 25, 1972	2–2	@ Pittsburgh Penguins (1972–73)	3–14–2
20	L	November 26, 1972	2–9	@ Buffalo Sabres (1972–73)	3–15–2
21	L	November 28, 1972	2–7	Buffalo Sabres (1972–73)	3–16–2

December

Game	Result	Date	Score	Opponent	Record
22	L	December 2, 1972	1–4	Detroit Red Wings (1972–73)	3–17–2
23	L	December 3, 1972	1–5	@ Boston Bruins (1972–73)	3–18–2
24	L	December 5, 1972	1–6	Los Angeles Kings (1972–73)	3–19–2
25	L	December 9, 1972	1–4	New York Rangers (1972–73)	3–20–2
26	L	December 10, 1972	1–4	@ New York Rangers (1972–73)	3–21–2
27	T	December 12, 1972	4–4	St. Louis Blues (1972–73)	3–21–3
28	L	December 13, 1972	1–9	@ Pittsburgh Penguins (1972–73)	3–22–3
29	L	December 16, 1972	1–2	Philadelphia Flyers (1972–73)	3–23–3
30	L	December 17, 1972	0–4	@ Atlanta Flames (1972–73)	3–24–3
31	L	December 20, 1972	2–4	@ Montreal Canadiens (1972–73)	3–25–3
32	T	December 21, 1972	4–4	Vancouver Canucks (1972–73)	3–25–4
33	W	December 23, 1972	4–2	Minnesota North Stars (1972–73)	4–25–4
34	L	December 27, 1972	1–4	@ Los Angeles Kings (1972–73)	4–26–4
35	L	December 29, 1972	2–5	@ California Golden Seals (1972–73)	4–27–4
36	L	December 30, 1972	2–5	@ Vancouver Canucks (1972–73)	4–28–4

January

Game	Result	Date	Score	Opponent	Record
37	L	January 2, 1973	1–6	Atlanta Flames (1972–73)	4–29–4
38	L	January 3, 1973	1–4	@ Buffalo Sabres (1972–73)	4–30–4
39	L	January 6, 1973	0–4	Detroit Red Wings (1972–73)	4–31–4
40	L	January 7, 1973	0–4	@ Detroit Red Wings (1972–73)	4–32–4
41	L	January 9, 1973	2–3	Los Angeles Kings (1972–73)	4–33–4
42	L	January 10, 1973	2–4	@ Toronto Maple Leafs (1972–73)	4–34–4
43	L	January 13, 1973	1–8	@ Minnesota North Stars (1972–73)	4–35–4
44	L	January 14, 1973	1–2	St. Louis Blues (1972–73)	4–36–4
45	L	January 16, 1973	0–1	Minnesota North Stars (1972–73)	4–37–4
46	W	January 18, 1973	9–7	@ Boston Bruins (1972–73)	5–37–4
47	L	January 20, 1973	1–5	@ St. Louis Blues (1972–73)	5–38–4
48	W	January 23, 1973	8–1	California Golden Seals (1972–73)	6–38–4
49	L	January 24, 1973	1–6	@ Montreal Canadiens (1972–73)	6–39–4
50	L	January 26, 1973	1–5	@ Vancouver Canucks (1972–73)	6–40–4
51	L	January 31, 1973	3–5	@ Toronto Maple Leafs (1972–73)	6–41–4

February

Game	Result	Date	Score	Opponent	Record
52	L	February 1, 1973	3–5	Chicago Black Hawks (1972–73)	6–42–4
53	T	February 3, 1973	1–1	Buffalo Sabres (1972–73)	6–42–5
54	L	February 4, 1973	1–5	@ Buffalo Sabres (1972–73)	6–43–5
55	W	February 6, 1973	4–2	Toronto Maple Leafs (1972–73)	7–43–5
56	L	February 7, 1973	0–6	@ New York Rangers (1972–73)	7–44–5
57	L	February 10, 1973	0–6	New York Rangers (1972–73)	7–45–5
58	L	February 13, 1973	2–8	@ Philadelphia Flyers (1972–73)	7–46–5
59	L	February 14, 1973	2–4	@ Chicago Black Hawks (1972–73)	7–47–5
60	L	February 17, 1973	2–6	@ Toronto Maple Leafs (1972–73)	7–48–5
61	L	February 18, 1973	2–3	@ New York Rangers (1972–73)	7–49–5
62	L	February 20, 1973	0–4	Pittsburgh Penguins (1972–73)	7–50–5
63	L	February 22, 1973	1–2	@ Pittsburgh Penguins (1972–73)	7–51–5
64	W	February 24, 1973	4–2	Detroit Red Wings (1972–73)	8–51–5
65	L	February 27, 1973	3–5	Chicago Black Hawks (1972–73)	8–52–5

March

Game	Result	Date	Score	Opponent	Record
66	W	March 3, 1973	9–3	Vancouver Canucks (1972–73)	9–52–5
67	L	March 4, 1973	1–5	@ Detroit Red Wings (1972–73)	9–53–5
68	L	March 6, 1973	2–3	Montreal Canadiens (1972–73)	9–54–5
69	L	March 8, 1973	1–4	Toronto Maple Leafs (1972–73)	9–55–5
70	L	March 10, 1973	4–5	@ St. Louis Blues (1972–73)	9–56–5
71	L	March 11, 1973	1–2	@ Minnesota North Stars (1972–73)	9–57–5
72	L	March 13, 1973	0–3	Boston Bruins (1972–73)	9–58–5
73	W	March 17, 1973	6–4	St. Louis Blues (1972–73)	10–58–5
74	W	March 20, 1973	6–3	California Golden Seals (1972–73)	11–58–5
75	W	March 24, 1973	3–2	Philadelphia Flyers (1972–73)	12–58–5
76	L	March 27, 1973	2–3	Buffalo Sabres (1972–73)	12–59–5
77	L	March 31, 1973	2–10	@ Philadelphia Flyers (1972–73)	12–60–5

April

Game	Result	Date	Score	Opponent	Record
78	T	April 1, 1973	4–4	@ Atlanta Flames (1972–73)	12–60–6

Legend: Win (2 points) Loss (0 points) Tie (1 point)

== Player statistics ==
=== Forwards ===
Note: GP = Games played; G = Goals; A = Assists; Pts = Points; PIM = Penalty minutes

Player	GP	G	A	Pts	PIM
Billy Harris	78	28	22	50	35
Ed Westfall	67	15	31	46	25
Germain Gagnon	63	12	29	41	31
Brian Spencer	78	14	24	38	90
Craig Cameron	72	19	14	33	27
Dave Hudson	69	12	19	31	17
Tom Miller	69	13	17	30	21
Lorne Henning	63	7	19	26	14
Terry Crisp	54	4	16	20	6
Don Blackburn	56	7	10	17	20
Bob Cook	33	8	6	14	14
Ralph Stewart	31	4	10	14	4
Brian Lavender	43	6	6	12	47
Brian Marchinko	36	2	6	8	0

=== Defensemen ===
Note: GP = Games played; G = Goals; A = Assists; Pts = Points; PIM = Penalty minutes

Player	GP	G	A	Pts	PIM
Jim Mair	49	2	11	13	41
Arnie Brown	48	4	8	12	27
Gerry Hart	47	1	11	12	158
Bill Mikkelson	72	1	10	11	45
Bryan Lefley	63	3	7	10	56
Neil Nicholson	30	3	1	4	23

=== Goaltending ===
Note: GP= Games played; MIN = Minutes; W = Wins; L = Losses; T = Ties; SO = Shutouts; GA = Goals against; GAA = Goals against average

Player	GP	MIN	W	L	T	SO	GA	GAA
Gerry Desjardins	37	2498	5	35	3	0	195	4.68
Gerry Gray	1	60	0	1	0	0	5	5.00
Billy Smith	37	2122	7	24	3	0	147	4.16
