= 1972–73 Toronto Maple Leafs season =

NHL hockey team season

1972–73 Toronto Maple Leafs
- Division: 6th East
- 1972–73 record: 27–41–10
- Home record: 20–12–7
- Road record: 7–29–3
- Goals for: 247
- Goals against: 279

Team information
- General manager: Jim Gregory
- Coach: John McLellan
- Captain: Dave Keon
- Arena: Maple Leaf Gardens

Team leaders
- Goals: Dave Keon (37)
- Assists: Darryl Sittler (48)
- Points: Darryl Sittler (77)
- Penalty minutes: Mike Pelyk (118)
- Wins: Ron Low (12)
- Goals against average: Jacques Plante (3.04)

The 1972–73 Toronto Maple Leafs season was Toronto's 56th season in the National Hockey League (NHL). The Leafs slipped to sixth place in the East and missed the playoffs for the first time since the 1969–70 season.

== Offseason ==
Toronto lost Bernie Parent, Rick Ley, Brad Selwood, Guy Trottier and Larry Pleau, who jumped to the new World Hockey Association (WHA).

== Regular season ==
=== Final standings ===
East Division
		GP	W	L	T	GF	GA	DIFF	Pts
1	Montreal Canadiens	78	52	10	16	329	184	+145	120
2	Boston Bruins	78	51	22	5	330	235	+95	107
3	New York Rangers	78	47	23	8	297	208	+89	102
4	Buffalo Sabres	78	37	27	14	257	219	+38	88
5	Detroit Red Wings	78	37	29	12	265	243	+22	86
6	Toronto Maple Leafs	78	27	41	10	247	279	−32	64
7	Vancouver Canucks	78	22	47	9	233	339	−106	53
8	New York Islanders	78	12	60	6	170	347	−177	30

=== Record vs. opponents ===
==== Vs. East Division ====
1972–73 NHL records
Team	BOS	BUF	DET	MTL	NYI	NYR	TOR	VAN	Total
Boston	—	4–1–1	3–2	1–3–1	5–1	3–3	4–1	4–1	24–12–2
Buffalo	1–4–1	—	1–4	1–2–2	5–0–1	5–1	4–1	3–2	20–14–4
Detroit	2–3	4–1	—	2–3–1	4–1	1–3–1	4–2	3–0–3	20–13–5
Montreal	3–1–1	2–1–2	3–2–1	—	5–0	3–0–2	5–0–1	6–0	27–4–7
N.Y. Islanders	1–5	0–5–1	1–4	0–5	—	0–6	1–4	1–3–1	4–32–2
N.Y. Rangers	3–3	1–5	3–1–1	0–3–2	6–0	—	4–1	3–2	20–15–3
Toronto	1–4	1–4	2–4	0–5–1	4–1	1–4	—	2–3–1	11–25–2
Vancouver	1–4	2–3	0–3–3	0–6	3–1–1	2–3	3–2–1	—	11–22–5

==== Vs. West Division ====
1972–73 NHL records
Team	ATL	CAL	CHI	LAK	MIN	PHI	PIT	STL	Total
Boston	5–0	4–0–1	2–3	3–2	3–1–1	4–0–1	4–1	2–3	27–10–3
Buffalo	2–1–2	1–2–2	2–3	2–1–2	3–2	2–3	3–0–2	2–1–2	17–13–10
Detroit	3–2	2–2–1	2–3	2–2–1	1–3–1	3–1–1	2–0–3	2–3	17–16–7
Montreal	3–0–2	3–0–2	2–3	4–0–1	3–1–1	2–2–1	5–0	3–0–2	25–6–9
N.Y. Islanders	0–4–1	4–1	0–4–1	1–4	1–4	1–4	0–4–1	1–3–1	8–28–4
N.Y. Rangers	4–1	3–1–1	2–2–1	3–0–2	3–2	4–0–1	3–2	5–0	27–8–5
Toronto	1–2–2	3–1–1	1–2–2	3–2	2–2–1	1–3–1	2–2–1	3–2	16–16–8
Vancouver	1–4	4–1	1–3–1	2–3	0–3–2	0–4–1	2–3	1–4	11–25–4

== Schedule and results ==
1972–73 regular season
October

Game	Result	Date	Score	Opponent	Record
1	L	October 7, 1972	1–3	Chicago Black Hawks (1972–73)	0–1–0
2	T	October 11, 1972	2–2	Montreal Canadiens (1972–73)	0–1–1
3	W	October 14, 1972	6–4	Los Angeles Kings (1972–73)	1–1–1
4	L	October 15, 1972	2–3	@ Buffalo Sabres (1972–73)	1–2–1
5	W	October 18, 1972	4–3	Pittsburgh Penguins (1972–73)	2–2–1
6	L	October 21, 1972	1–3	Detroit Red Wings (1972–73)	2–3–1
7	L	October 22, 1972	2–6	@ Detroit Red Wings (1972–73)	2–4–1
8	W	October 25, 1972	4–3	@ Minnesota North Stars (1972–73)	3–4–1
9	L	October 28, 1972	2–3	Boston Bruins (1972–73)	3–5–1
10	L	October 29, 1972	2–5	@ Philadelphia Flyers (1972–73)	3–6–1

November

Game	Result	Date	Score	Opponent	Record
11	W	November 1, 1972	7–1	Buffalo Sabres (1972–73)	4–6–1
12	W	November 4, 1972	4–2	St. Louis Blues (1972–73)	5–6–1
13	T	November 5, 1972	2–2	@ Atlanta Flames (1972–73)	5–6–2
14	L	November 8, 1972	2–5	@ Montreal Canadiens (1972–73)	5–7–2
15	L	November 11, 1972	0–1	@ St. Louis Blues (1972–73)	5–8–2
16	W	November 15, 1972	2–1	Atlanta Flames (1972–73)	6–8–2
17	T	November 18, 1972	4–4	Minnesota North Stars (1972–73)	6–8–3
18	L	November 19, 1972	5–6	@ Boston Bruins (1972–73)	6–9–3
19	L	November 22, 1972	1–3	@ Minnesota North Stars (1972–73)	6–10–3
20	W	November 25, 1972	11–0	California Golden Seals (1972–73)	7–10–3
21	L	November 26, 1972	4–7	@ New York Rangers (1972–73)	7–11–3
22	L	November 28, 1972	2–4	@ St. Louis Blues (1972–73)	7–12–3
23	L	November 29, 1972	4–7	@ Pittsburgh Penguins (1972–73)	7–13–3

December

Game	Result	Date	Score	Opponent	Record
24	T	December 2, 1972	2–2	Philadelphia Flyers (1972–73)	7–13–4
25	W	December 3, 1972	3–0	@ Detroit Red Wings (1972–73)	8–13–4
26	W	December 5, 1972	5–2	@ Vancouver Canucks (1972–73)	9–13–4
27	T	December 9, 1972	5–5	Vancouver Canucks (1972–73)	9–13–5
28	L	December 10, 1972	2–5	@ Philadelphia Flyers (1972–73)	9–14–5
29	L	December 13, 1972	3–4	New York Rangers (1972–73)	9–15–5
30	L	December 16, 1972	1–4	Detroit Red Wings (1972–73)	9–16–5
31	L	December 17, 1972	0–4	@ Buffalo Sabres (1972–73)	9–17–5
32	L	December 20, 1972	3–5	@ Atlanta Flames (1972–73)	9–18–5
33	W	December 23, 1972	5–3	Chicago Black Hawks (1972–73)	10–18–5
34	L	December 24, 1972	1–5	@ Chicago Black Hawks (1972–73)	10–19–5
35	T	December 27, 1972	3–3	Pittsburgh Penguins (1972–73)	10–19–6
36	W	December 29, 1972	4–0	@ Pittsburgh Penguins (1972–73)	11–19–6
37	W	December 30, 1972	5–4	St. Louis Blues (1972–73)	12–19–6

January

Game	Result	Date	Score	Opponent	Record
38	L	January 3, 1973	4–8	Montreal Canadiens (1972–73)	12–20–6
39	W	January 6, 1973	4–2	Los Angeles Kings (1972–73)	13–20–6
40	W	January 7, 1973	4–0	California Golden Seals (1972–73)	14–20–6
41	W	January 10, 1973	4–2	New York Islanders (1972–73)	15–20–6
42	L	January 12, 1973	0–1	@ Atlanta Flames (1972–73)	15–21–6
43	L	January 13, 1973	1–4	Boston Bruins (1972–73)	15–22–6
44	L	January 16, 1973	4–6	@ Vancouver Canucks (1972–73)	15–23–6
45	T	January 17, 1973	3–3	@ California Golden Seals (1972–73)	15–23–7
46	W	January 20, 1973	6–2	@ Los Angeles Kings (1972–73)	16–23–7
47	L	January 24, 1973	2–5	@ Pittsburgh Penguins (1972–73)	16–24–7
48	L	January 27, 1973	2–4	@ Montreal Canadiens (1972–73)	16–25–7
49	L	January 28, 1973	2–5	@ New York Rangers (1972–73)	16–26–7
50	W	January 31, 1973	5–3	New York Islanders (1972–73)	17–26–7

February

Game	Result	Date	Score	Opponent	Record
51	L	February 1, 1973	2–5	@ Boston Bruins (1972–73)	17–27–7
52	L	February 3, 1973	1–2	Vancouver Canucks (1972–73)	17–28–7
53	L	February 6, 1973	2–4	@ New York Islanders (1972–73)	17–29–7
54	W	February 7, 1973	5–3	California Golden Seals (1972–73)	18–29–7
55	L	February 10, 1973	2–4	Los Angeles Kings (1972–73)	18–30–7
56	L	February 14, 1973	2–3	Buffalo Sabres (1972–73)	18–31–7
57	W	February 17, 1973	6–2	New York Islanders (1972–73)	19–31–7
58	L	February 18, 1973	1–2	Montreal Canadiens (1972–73)	19–32–7
59	T	February 21, 1973	2–2	Atlanta Flames (1972–73)	19–32–8
60	W	February 24, 1973	4–2	St. Louis Blues (1972–73)	20–32–8
61	W	February 28, 1973	7–2	Vancouver Canucks (1972–73)	21–32–8

March

Game	Result	Date	Score	Opponent	Record
62	T	March 3, 1973	3–3	Chicago Black Hawks (1972–73)	21–32–9
63	L	March 4, 1973	0–10	@ Philadelphia Flyers (1972–73)	21–33–9
64	L	March 7, 1973	1–4	@ Montreal Canadiens (1972–73)	21–34–9
65	W	March 8, 1973	4–1	@ New York Islanders (1972–73)	22–34–9
66	W	March 10, 1973	4–3	Minnesota North Stars (1972–73)	23–34–9
67	L	March 11, 1973	2–4	@ New York Rangers (1972–73)	23–35–9
68	W	March 14, 1973	5–1	Philadelphia Flyers (1972–73)	24–35–9
69	L	March 15, 1973	2–5	@ Minnesota North Stars (1972–73)	24–36–9
70	W	March 17, 1973	7–5	New York Rangers (1972–73)	25–36–9
71	L	March 18, 1973	1–5	@ Buffalo Sabres (1972–73)	25–37–9
72	L	March 21, 1973	1–5	@ Los Angeles Kings (1972–73)	25–38–9
73	L	March 23, 1973	4–7	@ California Golden Seals (1972–73)	25–39–9
74	L	March 25, 1973	4–7	@ Vancouver Canucks (1972–73)	25–40–9
75	L	March 27, 1973	1–8	Detroit Red Wings (1972–73)	25–41–9
76	W	March 29, 1973	6–4	@ Detroit Red Wings (1972–73)	26–41–9
77	W	March 31, 1973	7–3	Boston Bruins (1972–73)	27–41–9

April

Game	Result	Date	Score	Opponent	Record
78	T	April 1, 1973	4–4	@ Chicago Black Hawks (1972–73)	27–41–10

Legend: Win (2 points) Loss (0 points) Tie (1 point)

== Player statistics ==
=== Regular season ===
Scoring

Player	Pos	GP	G	A	Pts	PIM	+/-	PPG	SHG	GWG
Darryl Sittler	C	78	29	48	77	69	−11	8	0	1
Rick Kehoe	RW	77	33	42	75	20	−11	2	0	5
Dave Keon	C	76	37	36	73	2	4	8	2	6
Norm Ullman	C	65	20	35	55	10	−18	3	0	1
Jim McKenny	D	77	11	41	52	55	6	5	0	0
Ron Ellis	RW	78	22	29	51	22	−1	4	1	2
Pierre Jarry	LW	74	19	18	37	42	−13	2	0	2
Denis Dupere	LW	61	13	23	36	10	−4	4	0	0
Paul Henderson	RW	40	18	16	34	18	2	2	0	3
Errol Thompson	LW	68	13	19	32	8	4	2	0	1
Garry Monahan	LW	78	13	18	31	53	−3	0	0	3
George Ferguson	C	72	10	13	23	34	−17	3	0	1
Mike Pelyk	D	72	3	16	19	118	−20	0	0	1
Brian Glennie	D	44	1	10	11	54	2	0	0	0
Joe Lundrigan	D	49	2	8	10	20	4	1	0	1
John Grisdale	D	49	1	7	8	76	−22	0	0	0
Dave Fortier	D	23	1	4	5	63	−10	0	0	0
Larry McIntyre	D	40	0	3	3	26	6	0	0	0
Bob Baun	D	5	1	1	2	4	−5	0	0	0
Randy Osburn	LW	26	0	2	2	0	−5	0	0	0
Terry Clancy	RW	32	0	1	1	6	−10	0	0	0
Ron Low	G	42	0	0	0	4	0	0	0	0
Gord McRae	G	11	0	0	0	0	0	0	0	0
Lyle Moffat	LW	1	0	0	0	0	−1	0	0	0
Jacques Plante	G	32	0	0	0	0	0	0	0	0
Dale Smedsmo	LW	4	0	0	0	0	0	0	0	0

Goaltending

Player	MIN	GP	W	L	T	GA	GAA	SO
Ron Low	2343	42	12	24	4	152	3.89	1
Jacques Plante	1717	32	8	14	6	87	3.04	1
Gord McRae	620	11	7	3	0	39	3.77	0
Team:	4680	78	27	41	10	278	3.56	2

Note:

Pos = Position;GP = Games played; G = Goals; A = Assists; Pts = Points; PIM = Penalty minutes; +/- = Plus/minus; PPG = Power-play goals; SHG = Short-handed goals; GWG = Game-winning goals
Pos = Position;GP = Games played; Min, TOI = Minutes played; W = Wins; L = Losses; T,T/OT = Ties; OTL = Overtime losses; GA = Goals-against; GAA = Goals-against average; SO = Shutouts; SA = Shots against; SV = Shots saved;SV% = Save percentage;

== Transactions ==
The Maple Leafs have been involved in the following transactions during the 1972–73 season.

=== Trades ===
March 3, 1973	To Boston Bruins Jacques Plante; 3rd round pick in 1973 – Doug Gibson	To Toronto Maple Leafs 1st round pick in 1973 – Ian Turnbull; Future Considerations
May 15, 1973	To Minnesota North Stars 11th round pick in 1973 – Russ Wiechnik	To Toronto Maple Leafs Cash
May 15, 1973	To Philadelphia Flyers Bernie Parent; 2nd round pick in 1973 – Larry Goodenough	To Toronto Maple Leafs 1st round pick in 1973 – Bob Neely; Future Considerations
May 15, 1973	To New York Islanders Cash	To Toronto Maple Leafs 10th round pick in 1973 – Lee Palmer; 11th round pick in 1973 – Norm McLeod

=== Free agents ===
Player	Former team
Borje Salming	Brynäs IF (Division 1)
Inge Hammarstrom	Brynäs IF (Division 1)

== Draft picks ==
Toronto's draft picks at the 1972 NHL amateur draft held at the Queen Elizabeth Hotel in Montreal.

Round	#	Player	Nationality	College/Junior/Club team (League)
1	11	George Ferguson	Canada	Toronto Marlboros (OMJHL)
2	27	Randy Osburn	Canada	London Knights (OMJHL)
3	43	Denis Deslauriers	Canada	Shawinigan Dynamos (QMJHL)
4	59	Brian Bowles	Canada	Cornwall Royals (OMJHL)
5	75	Michel Plante	Canada	Drummondville Rangers (QMJHL)
6	91	Dave Shardlow	Canada	Flin Flon Bombers (WCHL)
7	107	Monte Miron	Canada	Clarkson University (ECAC)
8	123	Peter Williams	Canada	University of Prince Edward Island (CIAU)
9	139	Pat Boutette	Canada	University of Minnesota Duluth (WCHA)
9	143	Garry Schofield	United States	Clarkson University (ECAC)

== See also ==
- 1972–73 NHL season
