= 1972–73 Buffalo Sabres season =

NHL hockey team season

1972–73 Buffalo Sabres
- Division: 4th East
- 1972–73 record: 37–27–14
- Home record: 30–6–3
- Road record: 7–21–11
- Goals for: 257
- Goals against: 219

Team information
- General manager: Punch Imlach
- Coach: Joe Crozier
- Captain: Gerry Meehan
- Alternate captains: Tim Horton; Gilbert Perreault; Tracy Pratt
- Arena: Buffalo Memorial Auditorium
- Average attendance: 15,632

Team leaders
- Goals: Rene Robert (40)
- Assists: Gilbert Perreault (60)
- Points: Gilbert Perreault (88)
- Penalty minutes: Jim Schoenfeld (178)
- Wins: Roger Crozier (23)
- Goals against average: Dave Dryden (2.65)

The 1972–73 Buffalo Sabres season was the Sabres' third season of operation in the National Hockey League (NHL). The team made it to the playoffs for the first time, but lost in the first round to Montreal, four games to two.

== Offseason ==
The Sabres added future Hall of Fame defenseman Tim Horton in the intra-league draft. In the Amateur Draft, the Sabres picked defenseman Jim Schoenfeld as their first-round pick, fifth over-all.

== Regular season ==
=== Final standings ===
East Division
		GP	W	L	T	GF	GA	DIFF	Pts
1	Montreal Canadiens	78	52	10	16	329	184	+145	120
2	Boston Bruins	78	51	22	5	330	235	+95	107
3	New York Rangers	78	47	23	8	297	208	+89	102
4	Buffalo Sabres	78	37	27	14	257	219	+38	88
5	Detroit Red Wings	78	37	29	12	265	243	+22	86
6	Toronto Maple Leafs	78	27	41	10	247	279	−32	64
7	Vancouver Canucks	78	22	47	9	233	339	−106	53
8	New York Islanders	78	12	60	6	170	347	−177	30

=== Record vs. opponents ===
==== Vs. East Division ====
1972–73 NHL records
Team	BOS	BUF	DET	MTL	NYI	NYR	TOR	VAN	Total
Boston	—	4–1–1	3–2	1–3–1	5–1	3–3	4–1	4–1	24–12–2
Buffalo	1–4–1	—	1–4	1–2–2	5–0–1	5–1	4–1	3–2	20–14–4
Detroit	2–3	4–1	—	2–3–1	4–1	1–3–1	4–2	3–0–3	20–13–5
Montreal	3–1–1	2–1–2	3–2–1	—	5–0	3–0–2	5–0–1	6–0	27–4–7
N.Y. Islanders	1–5	0–5–1	1–4	0–5	—	0–6	1–4	1–3–1	4–32–2
N.Y. Rangers	3–3	1–5	3–1–1	0–3–2	6–0	—	4–1	3–2	20–15–3
Toronto	1–4	1–4	2–4	0–5–1	4–1	1–4	—	2–3–1	11–25–2
Vancouver	1–4	2–3	0–3–3	0–6	3–1–1	2–3	3–2–1	—	11–22–5

==== Vs. West Division ====
1972–73 NHL records
Team	ATL	CAL	CHI	LAK	MIN	PHI	PIT	STL	Total
Boston	5–0	4–0–1	2–3	3–2	3–1–1	4–0–1	4–1	2–3	27–10–3
Buffalo	2–1–2	1–2–2	2–3	2–1–2	3–2	2–3	3–0–2	2–1–2	17–13–10
Detroit	3–2	2–2–1	2–3	2–2–1	1–3–1	3–1–1	2–0–3	2–3	17–16–7
Montreal	3–0–2	3–0–2	2–3	4–0–1	3–1–1	2–2–1	5–0	3–0–2	25–6–9
N.Y. Islanders	0–4–1	4–1	0–4–1	1–4	1–4	1–4	0–4–1	1–3–1	8–28–4
N.Y. Rangers	4–1	3–1–1	2–2–1	3–0–2	3–2	4–0–1	3–2	5–0	27–8–5
Toronto	1–2–2	3–1–1	1–2–2	3–2	2–2–1	1–3–1	2–2–1	3–2	16–16–8
Vancouver	1–4	4–1	1–3–1	2–3	0–3–2	0–4–1	2–3	1–4	11–25–4

== Schedule and results ==
1972–73 regular season
October

Game	Result	Date	Score	Opponent	Record
1	W	October 8, 1972	5–3	Atlanta Flames (1972–73)	1–0–0
2	W	October 11, 1972	7–3	Los Angeles Kings (1972–73)	2–0–0
3	T	October 14, 1972	1–1	@ Atlanta Flames (1972–73)	2–0–1
4	W	October 15, 1972	3–2	Toronto Maple Leafs (1972–73)	3–0–1
5	W	October 19, 1972	6–0	Vancouver Canucks (1972–73)	4–0–1
6	T	October 21, 1972	1–1	@ St. Louis Blues (1972–73)	4–0–2
7	W	October 22, 1972	7–2	Atlanta Flames (1972–73)	5–0–2
8	T	October 25, 1972	2–2	Boston Bruins (1972–73)	5–0–3
9	T	October 28, 1972	3–3	@ Montreal Canadiens (1972–73)	5–0–4
10	W	October 29, 1972	2–1	Minnesota North Stars (1972–73)	6–0–4

November

Game	Result	Date	Score	Opponent	Record
11	L	November 1, 1972	1–7	@ Toronto Maple Leafs (1972–73)	6–1–4
12	L	November 4, 1972	3–5	@ Philadelphia Flyers (1972–73)	6–2–4
13	T	November 5, 1972	1–1	St. Louis Blues (1972–73)	6–2–5
14	T	November 9, 1972	0–0	California Golden Seals (1972–73)	6–2–6
15	L	November 11, 1972	1–3	@ Philadelphia Flyers (1972–73)	6–3–6
16	W	November 12, 1972	1–0	Pittsburgh Penguins (1972–73)	7–3–6
17	T	November 15, 1972	3–3	@ Los Angeles Kings (1972–73)	7–3–7
18	L	November 17, 1972	1–5	@ California Golden Seals (1972–73)	7–4–7
19	L	November 19, 1972	5–9	@ Vancouver Canucks (1972–73)	7–5–7
20	L	November 22, 1972	2–6	@ Detroit Red Wings (1972–73)	7–6–7
21	W	November 23, 1972	5–3	New York Rangers (1972–73)	8–6–7
22	W	November 26, 1972	9–2	New York Islanders (1972–73)	9–6–7
23	W	November 28, 1972	7–2	@ New York Islanders (1972–73)	10–6–7
24	L	November 30, 1972	4–5	@ Boston Bruins (1972–73)	10–7–7

December

Game	Result	Date	Score	Opponent	Record
25	L	December 2, 1972	6–8	@ Minnesota North Stars (1972–73)	10–8–7
26	W	December 3, 1972	7–4	Minnesota North Stars (1972–73)	11–8–7
27	W	December 6, 1972	3–2	@ New York Rangers (1972–73)	12–8–7
28	W	December 7, 1972	6–1	Detroit Red Wings (1972–73)	13–8–7
29	W	December 10, 1972	4–2	Montreal Canadiens (1972–73)	14–8–7
30	W	December 13, 1972	7–3	Boston Bruins (1972–73)	15–8–7
31	W	December 16, 1972	4–3	@ St. Louis Blues (1972–73)	16–8–7
32	W	December 17, 1972	4–0	Toronto Maple Leafs (1972–73)	17–8–7
33	W	December 20, 1972	6–3	Vancouver Canucks (1972–73)	18–8–7
34	L	December 22, 1972	2–4	@ California Golden Seals (1972–73)	18–9–7
35	L	December 23, 1972	0–2	@ Los Angeles Kings (1972–73)	18–10–7
36	W	December 27, 1972	4–1	@ New York Rangers (1972–73)	19–10–7
37	W	December 28, 1972	8–2	Chicago Black Hawks (1972–73)	20–10–7
38	L	December 31, 1972	2–4	@ Chicago Black Hawks (1972–73)	20–11–7

January

Game	Result	Date	Score	Opponent	Record
39	W	January 3, 1973	4–1	New York Islanders (1972–73)	21–11–7
40	L	January 4, 1973	2–4	@ Detroit Red Wings (1972–73)	21–12–7
41	W	January 6, 1973	4–1	@ New York Rangers (1972–73)	22–12–7
42	W	January 7, 1973	2–0	Philadelphia Flyers (1972–73)	23–12–7
43	L	January 11, 1973	2–4	New York Rangers (1972–73)	23–13–7
44	L	January 14, 1973	0–6	@ Boston Bruins (1972–73)	23–14–7
45	W	January 18, 1973	5–1	Chicago Black Hawks (1972–73)	24–14–7
46	L	January 20, 1973	2–4	@ Detroit Red Wings (1972–73)	24–15–7
47	L	January 21, 1973	3–4	Philadelphia Flyers (1972–73)	24–16–7
48	W	January 25, 1973	5–2	Minnesota North Stars (1972–73)	25–16–7
49	L	January 28, 1973	5–8	Atlanta Flames (1972–73)	25–17–7

February

Game	Result	Date	Score	Opponent	Record
50	W	February 1, 1973	5–3	Los Angeles Kings (1972–73)	26–17–7
51	T	February 3, 1973	1–1	@ New York Islanders (1972–73)	26–17–8
52	W	February 4, 1973	5–1	New York Islanders (1972–73)	27–17–8
53	L	February 7, 1973	1–2	@ Chicago Black Hawks (1972–73)	27–18–8
54	W	February 8, 1973	4–0	California Golden Seals (1972–73)	28–18–8
55	L	February 10, 1973	1–2	@ Montreal Canadiens (1972–73)	28–19–8
56	L	February 11, 1973	2–5	Detroit Red Wings (1972–73)	28–20–8
57	W	February 14, 1973	3–2	@ Toronto Maple Leafs (1972–73)	29–20–8
58	W	February 15, 1973	4–1	New York Rangers (1972–73)	30–20–8
59	T	February 17, 1973	3–3	@ Pittsburgh Penguins (1972–73)	30–20–9
60	W	February 18, 1973	4–1	Pittsburgh Penguins (1972–73)	31–20–9
61	W	February 22, 1973	3–1	Vancouver Canucks (1972–73)	32–20–9
62	L	February 24, 1973	2–4	@ Minnesota North Stars (1972–73)	32–21–9
63	W	February 25, 1973	2–1	Pittsburgh Penguins (1972–73)	33–21–9

March

Game	Result	Date	Score	Opponent	Record
64	T	March 1, 1973	4–4	@ Atlanta Flames (1972–73)	33–21–10
65	L	March 4, 1973	2–4	Montreal Canadiens (1972–73)	33–22–10
66	T	March 6, 1973	2–2	@ Los Angeles Kings (1972–73)	33–22–11
67	T	March 7, 1973	2–2	@ California Golden Seals (1972–73)	33–22–12
68	L	March 9, 1973	2–5	@ Vancouver Canucks (1972–73)	33–23–12
69	L	March 13, 1973	0–2	@ St. Louis Blues (1972–73)	33–24–12
70	L	March 15, 1973	1–4	Boston Bruins (1972–73)	33–25–12
71	T	March 17, 1973	3–3	@ Montreal Canadiens (1972–73)	33–25–13
72	W	March 18, 1973	5–1	Toronto Maple Leafs (1972–73)	34–25–13
73	L	March 21, 1973	2–6	@ Chicago Black Hawks (1972–73)	34–26–13
74	T	March 24, 1973	4–4	@ Pittsburgh Penguins (1972–73)	34–26–14
75	L	March 25, 1973	1–6	@ Boston Bruins (1972–73)	34–27–14
76	W	March 27, 1973	3–2	@ New York Islanders (1972–73)	35–27–14
77	W	March 28, 1973	6–3	Philadelphia Flyers (1972–73)	36–27–14

April

Game	Result	Date	Score	Opponent	Record
78	W	April 1, 1973	3–1	St. Louis Blues (1972–73)	37–27–14

Legend: Win (2 points) Loss (0 points) Tie (1 point)

=== Playoffs ===
The 1972–73 season saw the Sabres qualify for the Stanley Cup playoffs for the first time. The team would ultimately lose to the eventual Stanley Cup Champion Montreal Canadiens in 6 games. After falling behind three games to none the Sabres won two straight to earn a final home game that was memorable for the "Thank you Sabres" chant from the end of the game.

1973 Stanley Cup playoffs
Quarterfinals vs. (E1) Montreal Canadiens – Canadiens win 4–2

Game	Date	Visitor	Score	Home	OT	Series
1	April 4	Buffalo Sabres	1–2	Montreal Canadiens		0–1
2	April 5	Buffalo Sabres	3–7	Montreal Canadiens		0–2
3	April 7	Montreal Canadiens	5–2	Buffalo Sabres		0–3
4	April 8	Montreal Canadiens	1–5	Buffalo Sabres		1–3
5	April 10	Buffalo Sabres	3–2	Montreal Canadiens	9:18	2–3
6	April 12	Montreal Canadiens	4–2	Buffalo Sabres		2–4

Legend: Win Loss

== Player statistics ==
Regular season
Scoring

Player	Pos	GP	G	A	Pts	PIM	+/-	PPG	SHG	GWG
Gilbert Perreault	C	78	28	60	88	10	11	8	0	7
Rene Robert	RW	75	40	43	83	83	16	9	0	6
Rick Martin	LW	75	37	36	73	79	4	11	0	4
Jim Lorentz	C/RW	78	27	35	62	30	6	11	0	5
Gerry Meehan	C	77	31	29	60	21	4	3	1	6
Don Luce	C	78	18	25	43	32	7	0	3	2
Hugh Harris	C	60	12	26	38	17	9	0	0	0
Larry Hillman	D	78	5	24	29	56	−3	2	0	0
Craig Ramsay	LW	76	11	17	28	15	13	0	1	1
Larry Mickey	RW	77	15	9	24	47	−6	1	0	2
Mike Robitaille	D	65	4	17	21	40	9	0	0	0
Jim Schoenfeld	D	66	4	15	19	178	12	1	0	0
Steve Atkinson	RW	61	9	9	18	36	−5	2	0	1
Tim Horton	D	69	1	16	17	56	12	0	0	0
Tracy Pratt	D	74	1	15	16	116	9	0	0	0
Norm Gratton	LW	21	6	5	11	12	0	2	0	1
Larry Carriere	D	40	2	8	10	52	−1	1	0	0
Paul Terbenche	D	42	0	7	7	8	7	0	0	0
Randy Wyrozub	C	45	3	3	6	4	−1	0	0	2
Doug Rombough	C	5	2	0	2	0	2	0	0	0
Butch Deadmarsh	LW	34	1	1	2	26	−3	1	0	0
Rick Dudley	LW	6	0	1	1	7	−2	0	0	0
John Gould	RW	8	0	1	1	0	0	0	0	0
Ron Busniuk	RW	1	0	0	0	9	0	0	0	0
Roger Crozier	G	49	0	0	0	4	0	0	0	0
Dave Dryden	G	37	0	0	0	0	0	0	0	0
Rocky Farr	G	1	0	0	0	0	0	0	0	0
Ray McKay	D	1	0	0	0	0	0	0	0	0
Bob Richer	C	3	0	0	0	0	0	0	0	0

Goaltending

Player	MIN	GP	W	L	T	GA	GAA	SO
Roger Crozier	2633	49	23	13	7	121	2.76	3
Dave Dryden	2018	37	14	13	7	89	2.65	3
Rocky Farr	29	1	0	1	0	3	6.21	0
Team:	4680	78	37	27	14	213	2.73	6

Playoffs
Scoring

Player	Pos	GP	G	A	Pts	PIM	PPG	SHG	GWG
Gilbert Perreault	C	6	3	7	10	2	1	0	1
Rene Robert	RW	6	5	3	8	2	1	0	1
Rick Martin	LW	6	3	2	5	12	2	0	0
Jim Schoenfeld	D	6	2	1	3	4	0	0	0
Jim Lorentz	C/RW	6	0	3	3	2	0	0	0
Don Luce	C	6	1	1	2	2	0	0	0
Craig Ramsay	LW	6	1	1	2	0	0	0	0
Larry Mickey	RW	6	1	0	1	5	0	0	0
Larry Carriere	D	6	0	1	1	8	0	0	0
Roger Crozier	G	4	0	1	1	2	0	0	0
Norm Gratton	LW	6	0	1	1	2	0	0	0
Tim Horton	D	6	0	1	1	4	0	0	0
Gerry Meehan	C	6	0	1	1	0	0	0	0
Steve Atkinson	RW	1	0	0	0	0	0	0	0
Dave Dryden	G	2	0	0	0	0	0	0	0
Hugh Harris	C	3	0	0	0	0	0	0	0
Larry Hillman	D	6	0	0	0	8	0	0	0
Tracy Pratt	D	6	0	0	0	6	0	0	0
Mike Robitaille	D	6	0	0	0	0	0	0	0
Paul Terbenche	D	6	0	0	0	0	0	0	0

Goaltending

Player	MIN	GP	W	L	GA	GAA	SO
Roger Crozier	249	4	2	2	11	2.65	0
Dave Dryden	120	2	0	2	9	4.50	0
Team:	369	6	2	4	20	3.25	0

Note: Pos = Position; GP = Games played; G = Goals; A = Assists; Pts = Points; +/- = plus/minus; PIM = Penalty minutes; PPG = Power-play goals; SHG = Short-handed goals; GWG = Game-winning goals
MIN = Minutes played; W = Wins; L = Losses; T = Ties; GA = Goals-against; GAA = Goals-against average; SO = Shutouts;

== Awards and records ==
Lady Byng Memorial Trophy: Gilbert Perreault

== Transactions ==
=== Trades ===
Date	Details
June 6, 1972	To New York Islanders 7th-round pick in 1972 (Don McLaughlin); 8th-round pick in 1972 (Rene Levasseur); 9th-round pick in 1972 (Bill Ennos); 10th-round pick in 1972 (Rene Lambert)	To Buffalo Sabres Islanders promised to not draft certain players in the 1972 NHL expansion draft
June 8, 1972	To Montreal Canadiens Cash	To Buffalo Sabres Ron Busniuk
February 14, 1973	To Atlanta Flames Butch Deadmarsh	To Buffalo Sabres Norm Gratton

=== Lost via retirement ===
Player
Dick Duff

=== Claimed via Waivers ===
Player	Former team	Date claimed off waivers

=== Lost via Waivers ===
Player	New team	Date claimed off waivers
Kevin O'Shea	St. Louis Blues	March 3, 1972

=== Lost in the expansion draft ===
June 6, 1972	To New York Islanders Tom Miller
June 6, 1972	To New York Islanders Ken Murray
June 6, 1972	To Atlanta Flames Rod Zaine

=== 1972 NHL Intraleague Draft ===
June 5, 1972	From Pittsburgh Penguins Tim Horton

== Draft picks ==
=== NHL draft ===
Round	#	Player	Nationality	College/Junior/Club team
1	5	Jim Schoenfeld	Canada	Niagara Falls Flyers (OHA)
2	25	Larry Carriere	Canada	Loyola University (CIAU)
3	37	Jim McMasters	Canada	Calgary Centennials (WCHL)
4	53	Rychard Campeau	Canada	Sorel Black Hawks (QMJHL)
5	69	Gilles Gratton	Canada	Oshawa Generals (OHA)
6	85	Peter McNab	Canada	U. of Denver (WCHA)

== Farm teams ==
The 1972–73 AHL season was a successful one for the Sabres' AHL affiliate, the Cincinnati Swords. The Swords would finish first overall in the regular season with a 54–17–5 record. They would go on to win the Calder Cup in the playoffs losing only 3 games in the 3 round best-of-7 event. It would be the only championship won by the team in its short existence.

== See also ==
- 1972–73 NHL season
