= 1972–73 Montreal Canadiens season =

NHL hockey team season (18th Stanley Cup win)

1972–73 Montreal Canadiens
- Stanley Cup champions
- East Division champions
- Division: 1st East
- 1972–73 record: 52–10–13
- Home record: 29–4–6
- Road record: 23–6–10
- Goals for: 329
- Goals against: 184

Team information
- General manager: Sam Pollock
- Coach: Scotty Bowman
- Captain: Henri Richard
- Alternate captains: Yvan Cournoyer; Frank Mahovlich
- Arena: Montreal Forum

Team leaders
- Goals: Jacques Lemaire (44)
- Assists: Frank Mahovlich (55)
- Points: Jacques Lemaire (95)
- Penalty minutes: Guy Lapointe (117)
- Wins: Ken Dryden (38)
- Goals against average: Ken Dryden (2.24)

The 1972–73 Montreal Canadiens season, the club's 64th season, led to the Canadiens winning their 18th Stanley Cup in club history.

== Regular season ==
Rookie goalie Wayne Thomas left his mark in Canadiens history by becoming only the second goaltender in over 50 seasons to record a shutout (3–0) in his NHL debut against Vancouver on January 14, 1973.

=== Final standings ===
East Division
		GP	W	L	T	GF	GA	DIFF	Pts
1	Montreal Canadiens	78	52	10	16	329	184	+145	120
2	Boston Bruins	78	51	22	5	330	235	+95	107
3	New York Rangers	78	47	23	8	297	208	+89	102
4	Buffalo Sabres	78	37	27	14	257	219	+38	88
5	Detroit Red Wings	78	37	29	12	265	243	+22	86
6	Toronto Maple Leafs	78	27	41	10	247	279	−32	64
7	Vancouver Canucks	78	22	47	9	233	339	−106	53
8	New York Islanders	78	12	60	6	170	347	−177	30

=== Record vs. opponents ===
==== Vs. East Division ====
1972–73 NHL records
Team	BOS	BUF	DET	MTL	NYI	NYR	TOR	VAN	Total
Boston	—	4–1–1	3–2	1–3–1	5–1	3–3	4–1	4–1	24–12–2
Buffalo	1–4–1	—	1–4	1–2–2	5–0–1	5–1	4–1	3–2	20–14–4
Detroit	2–3	4–1	—	2–3–1	4–1	1–3–1	4–2	3–0–3	20–13–5
Montreal	3–1–1	2–1–2	3–2–1	—	5–0	3–0–2	5–0–1	6–0	27–4–7
N.Y. Islanders	1–5	0–5–1	1–4	0–5	—	0–6	1–4	1–3–1	4–32–2
N.Y. Rangers	3–3	1–5	3–1–1	0–3–2	6–0	—	4–1	3–2	20–15–3
Toronto	1–4	1–4	2–4	0–5–1	4–1	1–4	—	2–3–1	11–25–2
Vancouver	1–4	2–3	0–3–3	0–6	3–1–1	2–3	3–2–1	—	11–22–5

==== Vs. West Division ====
1972–73 NHL records
Team	ATL	CAL	CHI	LAK	MIN	PHI	PIT	STL	Total
Boston	5–0	4–0–1	2–3	3–2	3–1–1	4–0–1	4–1	2–3	27–10–3
Buffalo	2–1–2	1–2–2	2–3	2–1–2	3–2	2–3	3–0–2	2–1–2	17–13–10
Detroit	3–2	2–2–1	2–3	2–2–1	1–3–1	3–1–1	2–0–3	2–3	17–16–7
Montreal	3–0–2	3–0–2	2–3	4–0–1	3–1–1	2–2–1	5–0	3–0–2	25–6–9
N.Y. Islanders	0–4–1	4–1	0–4–1	1–4	1–4	1–4	0–4–1	1–3–1	8–28–4
N.Y. Rangers	4–1	3–1–1	2–2–1	3–0–2	3–2	4–0–1	3–2	5–0	27–8–5
Toronto	1–2–2	3–1–1	1–2–2	3–2	2–2–1	1–3–1	2–2–1	3–2	16–16–8
Vancouver	1–4	4–1	1–3–1	2–3	0–3–2	0–4–1	2–3	1–4	11–25–4

== Schedule and results ==
1972–73 regular season
October

Game	Result	Date	Score	Opponent	Record
1	W	October 7, 1972	3–0	Minnesota North Stars (1972–73)	1–0–0
2	T	October 11, 1972	2–2	@ Toronto Maple Leafs (1972–73)	1–0–1
3	W	October 12, 1972	3–0	Atlanta Flames (1972–73)	2–0–1
4	W	October 14, 1972	6–1	New York Rangers (1972–73)	3–0–1
5	T	October 18, 1972	4–4	@ St. Louis Blues (1972–73)	3–0–2
6	W	October 21, 1972	5–3	Vancouver Canucks (1972–73)	4–0–2
7	T	October 22, 1972	1–1	@ New York Rangers (1972–73)	4–0–3
8	W	October 24, 1972	4–3	@ New York Islanders (1972–73)	5–0–3
9	W	October 26, 1972	7–0	St. Louis Blues (1972–73)	6–0–3
10	T	October 28, 1972	3–3	Buffalo Sabres (1972–73)	6–0–4
11	W	October 29, 1972	2–1	@ Detroit Red Wings (1972–73)	7–0–4

November

Game	Result	Date	Score	Opponent	Record
12	W	November 1, 1972	7–1	@ Pittsburgh Penguins (1972–73)	8–0–4
13	W	November 2, 1972	6–1	@ Atlanta Flames (1972–73)	9–0–4
14	L	November 4, 1972	2–4	Detroit Red Wings (1972–73)	9–1–4
15	W	November 8, 1972	5–2	Toronto Maple Leafs (1972–73)	10–1–4
16	W	November 11, 1972	5–2	Los Angeles Kings (1972–73)	11–1–4
17	W	November 12, 1972	5–3	@ Boston Bruins (1972–73)	12–1–4
18	W	November 14, 1972	7–2	@ New York Islanders (1972–73)	13–1–4
19	W	November 16, 1972	6–5	Philadelphia Flyers (1972–73)	14–1–4
20	L	November 18, 1972	3–5	Chicago Black Hawks (1972–73)	14–2–4
21	T	November 22, 1972	3–3	@ Los Angeles Kings (1972–73)	14–2–5
22	W	November 24, 1972	9–1	@ Vancouver Canucks (1972–73)	15–2–5
23	L	November 26, 1972	2–3	@ Chicago Black Hawks (1972–73)	15–3–5
24	T	November 29, 1972	3–3	Boston Bruins (1972–73)	15–3–6

December

Game	Result	Date	Score	Opponent	Record
25	T	December 2, 1972	4–4	Atlanta Flames (1972–73)	15–3–7
26	L	December 3, 1972	2–5	@ Philadelphia Flyers (1972–73)	15–4–7
27	W	December 6, 1972	6–3	Minnesota North Stars (1972–73)	16–4–7
28	W	December 9, 1972	2–1	California Golden Seals (1972–73)	17–4–7
29	L	December 10, 1972	2–4	@ Buffalo Sabres (1972–73)	17–5–7
30	T	December 13, 1972	2–2	@ California Golden Seals (1972–73)	17–5–8
31	W	December 15, 1972	4–2	@ Vancouver Canucks (1972–73)	18–5–8
32	W	December 16, 1972	3–1	@ Los Angeles Kings (1972–73)	19–5–8
33	W	December 20, 1972	4–2	New York Islanders (1972–73)	20–5–8
34	W	December 23, 1972	6–3	Pittsburgh Penguins (1972–73)	21–5–8
35	W	December 26, 1972	4–1	@ St. Louis Blues (1972–73)	22–5–8
36	L	December 27, 1972	2–3	@ Minnesota North Stars (1972–73)	22–6–8
37	T	December 30, 1972	1–1	Atlanta Flames (1972–73)	22–6–9

January

Game	Result	Date	Score	Opponent	Record
38	W	January 3, 1973	8–4	@ Toronto Maple Leafs (1972–73)	23–6–9
39	W	January 6, 1973	5–0	California Golden Seals (1972–73)	24–6–9
40	T	January 8, 1973	3–3	Minnesota North Stars (1972–73)	24–6–10
41	W	January 10, 1973	6–0	@ Minnesota North Stars (1972–73)	25–6–10
42	T	January 12, 1973	3–3	@ California Golden Seals (1972–73)	25–6–11
43	W	January 14, 1973	3–0	@ Vancouver Canucks (1972–73)	26–6–11
44	W	January 17, 1973	6–4	Pittsburgh Penguins (1972–73)	27–6–11
45	W	January 18, 1973	5–2	@ Pittsburgh Penguins (1972–73)	28–6–11
46	W	January 20, 1973	6–3	Philadelphia Flyers (1972–73)	29–6–11
47	W	January 21, 1973	3–2	@ Atlanta Flames (1972–73)	30–6–11
48	W	January 24, 1973	6–1	New York Islanders (1972–73)	31–6–11
49	W	January 27, 1973	4–2	Toronto Maple Leafs (1972–73)	32–6–11
50	L	January 28, 1973	2–4	Detroit Red Wings (1972–73)	32–7–11

February

Game	Result	Date	Score	Opponent	Record
51	T	February 1, 1973	3–3	@ St. Louis Blues (1972–73)	32–7–12
52	W	February 3, 1973	7–1	@ Los Angeles Kings (1972–73)	33–7–12
53	W	February 4, 1973	6–1	@ California Golden Seals (1972–73)	34–7–12
54	W	February 7, 1973	5–2	Pittsburgh Penguins (1972–73)	35–7–12
55	W	February 10, 1973	2–1	Buffalo Sabres (1972–73)	36–7–12
56	T	February 11, 1973	2–2	@ New York Rangers (1972–73)	36–7–13
57	W	February 14, 1973	6–3	New York Rangers (1972–73)	37–7–13
58	L	February 17, 1973	6–7	Philadelphia Flyers (1972–73)	37–8–13
59	W	February 18, 1973	2–1	@ Toronto Maple Leafs (1972–73)	38–8–13
60	W	February 21, 1973	4–2	@ Chicago Black Hawks (1972–73)	39–8–13
61	T	February 22, 1973	3–3	@ Detroit Red Wings (1972–73)	39–8–14
62	W	February 24, 1973	7–3	Vancouver Canucks (1972–73)	40–8–14
63	W	February 28, 1973	5–2	Los Angeles Kings (1972–73)	41–8–14

March

Game	Result	Date	Score	Opponent	Record
64	W	March 3, 1973	5–1	Boston Bruins (1972–73)	42–8–14
65	W	March 4, 1973	4–2	@ Buffalo Sabres (1972–73)	43–8–14
66	W	March 6, 1973	3–2	@ New York Islanders (1972–73)	44–8–14
67	W	March 7, 1973	4–1	Toronto Maple Leafs (1972–73)	45–8–14
68	W	March 10, 1973	2–0	Detroit Red Wings (1972–73)	46–8–14
69	L	March 11, 1973	3–5	@ Boston Bruins (1972–73)	46–9–14
70	W	March 14, 1973	5–3	@ Detroit Red Wings (1972–73)	47–9–14
71	T	March 17, 1973	3–3	Buffalo Sabres (1972–73)	47–9–15
72	T	March 18, 1973	4–4	@ Philadelphia Flyers (1972–73)	47–9–16
73	W	March 21, 1973	3–2	Vancouver Canucks (1972–73)	48–9–16
74	W	March 24, 1973	11–4	St. Louis Blues (1972–73)	49–9–16
75	L	March 25, 1973	5–6	@ Chicago Black Hawks (1972–73)	49–10–16
76	W	March 28, 1973	4–3	Chicago Black Hawks (1972–73)	50–10–16
77	W	March 31, 1973	5–1	New York Rangers (1972–73)	51–10–16

April

Game	Result	Date	Score	Opponent	Record
78	W	April 1, 1973	5–3	@ Boston Bruins (1972–73)	52–10–16

Legend: Win (2 points) Loss (0 points) Tie (1 point)

== Playoffs ==
The Canadiens met the Buffalo Sabres making their playoff debut in the first round, defeating the Sabres four games to two. In the second round, the Canadiens defeated the Philadelphia Flyers who had beaten the Minnesota North Stars, winning the series four games to one to advance to the finals against the Chicago Black Hawks.

=== Finals ===
==== Chicago Black Hawks vs. Montreal Canadiens ====
Date	Visitors	Score	Home	Score	Notes
April 29	Chicago	3	Montreal	8	
May 1	Chicago	1	Montreal	4	
May 3	Montreal	4	Chicago	7	
May 6	Montreal	4	Chicago	0	
May 8	Chicago	8	Montreal	7	
May 10	Montreal	6	Chicago	4	

Montreal wins the series 4–2.

== Player statistics ==
=== Regular season ===
==== Scoring ====
Player	Pos	GP	G	A	Pts	PIM	+/-	PPG	SHG	GWG
Jacques Lemaire	C	77	44	51	95	16	59	9	0	5
Frank Mahovlich	LW	78	38	55	93	51	42	8	2	5
Yvan Cournoyer	RW	67	40	39	79	18	50	6	0	4
Pete Mahovlich	C	61	21	38	59	49	21	3	4	3
Guy Lafleur	RW	69	28	27	55	51	16	9	0	7
Guy Lapointe	D	76	19	35	54	117	51	3	0	2
Marc Tardif	LW	76	25	25	50	48	18	3	0	4
Rejean Houle	W	72	13	35	48	36	24	3	0	1
Chuck Lefley	LW	65	21	25	46	22	35	1	1	7
Henri Richard	C	71	8	35	43	21	34	0	0	2
Serge Savard	D	74	7	32	39	58	70	2	1	0
Claude Larose	RW	73	11	23	34	30	29	0	0	0
Jim Roberts	D/RW	77	14	18	32	28	33	0	1	3
Murray Wilson	LW	52	18	9	27	16	14	0	0	3
Bob Murdoch	D	69	2	22	24	55	39	0	0	2
Jacques Laperriere	D	57	7	16	23	34	78	2	0	0
Steve Shutt	LW	50	8	8	16	24	5	1	0	2
Pierre Bouchard	D	41	0	7	7	69	11	0	0	0
Larry Robinson	D	36	2	4	6	20	3	0	0	1
Ken Dryden	G	54	0	4	4	2	0	0	0	0
Chuck Arnason	RW	19	1	1	2	2	−1	1	0	0
Dave Gardner	C	5	1	1	2	0	0	1	0	0
Randy Rota	C/LW	2	1	1	2	0	2	0	0	1
Dale Hoganson	D	25	0	2	2	2	4	0	0	0
Wayne Thomas	G	10	0	1	1	2	0	0	0	0
Yvon Lambert	LW	1	0	0	0	0	0	0	0	0
Michel Plasse	G	17	0	0	0	4	0	0	0	0

==== Goaltending ====
= Indicates league leader

Player	MIN	GP	W	L	T	GA	GAA	SO
Ken Dryden	3165	54	33	7	13	119	2.26	6
Michel Plasse	932	17	11	2	3	40	2.58	0
Wayne Thomas	583	10	8	1	0	23	2.37	1
Team:	4680	78	52	10	16	182	2.33	7

=== Playoffs ===
==== Scoring ====
Player	Pos	GP	G	A	Pts	PIM	PPG	SHG	GWG
Yvan Cournoyer	RW	17	15	10	25	2	3	0	3
Frank Mahovlich	LW	17	9	14	23	6	1	0	0
Jacques Lemaire	C	17	7	13	20	2	3	0	1
Guy Lapointe	D	17	6	7	13	20	2	0	1
Pete Mahovlich	C	17	4	9	13	22	2	1	0
Marc Tardif	LW	14	6	6	12	6	2	0	2
Serge Savard	D	17	3	8	11	22	0	0	0
Henri Richard	C	17	6	4	10	14	0	0	2
Rejean Houle	W	17	3	6	9	0	0	0	0
Guy Lafleur	RW	17	3	5	8	9	2	0	1
Chuck Lefley	LW	17	3	5	8	6	0	0	0
Claude Larose	RW	17	3	4	7	6	0	0	0
Murray Wilson	LW	16	2	4	6	6	0	0	1
Larry Robinson	D	11	1	4	5	9	0	0	1
Pierre Bouchard	D	17	1	3	4	13	0	0	0
Jacques Laperriere	D	10	1	3	4	2	0	0	0
Bob Murdoch	D	13	0	3	3	10	0	0	0
Jim Roberts	D/RW	17	0	2	2	22	0	0	0
Ken Dryden	G	17	0	0	0	2	0	0	0
Steve Shutt	LW	1	0	0	0	0	0	0	0

==== Goaltending ====
Player	MIN	GP	W	L	GA	GAA	SO
Ken Dryden	1039	17	12	5	50	2.89	1
Team:	1039	17	12	5	50	2.89	1

Note:

Pos = Position;GP = Games played; G = Goals; A = Assists; Pts = Points; PIM = Penalty minutes; +/- = Plus/minus; PPG = Power-play goals; SHG = Short-handed goals; GWG = Game-winning goals
Pos = Position;GP = Games played; Min, TOI = Minutes played; W = Wins; L = Losses; T,T/OT = Ties; OTL = Overtime losses; GA = Goals-against; GAA = Goals-against average; SO = Shutouts; SA = Shots against; SV = Shots saved;SV% = Save percentage;

== Awards and records ==
- Prince of Wales Trophy.
- Guy Lapointe, runner up, Norris Trophy.
- Yvan Cournoyer won the Conn Smythe Trophy as playoff MVP.

== Draft picks ==
Montreal's draft picks at the 1972 NHL amateur draft held at the Queen Elizabeth Hotel in Montreal.

Round	#	Player	Nationality	College/Junior/Club team (League)
1	4	Steve Shutt	Canada	Toronto Marlboros (OMJHL)
1	6	Michel Larocque	Canada	Ottawa 67's (OMJHL)
1	8	Dave Gardner	Canada	Toronto Marlboros (OMJHL)
1	14	John Van Boxmeer	Canada	Guelph CMC's (SOJHL)
3	46	Ed Gilbert	Canada	Hamilton Red Wings (OMJHL)
4	62	Dave Elenbaas	Canada	Cornell University (ECAC)
5	66	Bill Nyrop	United States	University of Notre Dame (WCHA)
6	94	D'Arcy Ryan	Canada	Yale University (ECAC)
7	110	Yves Archambault	Canada	Sorel Eperviers (QMJHL)
8	126	Graham Parsons	Canada	Red Deer Rustlers (AJHL)
9	142	Eddie Bumbacco	Canada	University of Notre Dame (WCHA)
10	151	Fred Riggall	Canada	Dartmouth College (ECAC)
11	152	Ron LeBlanc	Canada	Universite de Moncton (CIAU)

== See also ==
- 1972–73 NHL season
- List of Stanley Cup champions
