= Brent Meeke =

Canadian ice hockey player

- Born: June 20, 1950 (age 74); Toronto, Ontario, Canada
- Height: 5 ft 11 in (180 cm)
- Weight: 179 lb (81 kg; 12 st 11 lb)
- Position: Right Wing
- Shot: Left
- Played for: Cleveland Barons; California Golden Seals
- NHL draft: 118th overall, 1972; California Golden Seals
- Playing career: 1972–1981

Brent Alan Meeke (born April 10, 1952) is a Canadian retired professional ice hockey forward who played 75 games in the National Hockey League for the Cleveland Barons and California Golden Seals between 1972 and 1977. He later served as the head coach for the College of Wooster Fighting Scots ACHA men's ice hockey team from 2014 to 2017.

Meeke was born in Toronto, Ontario. As a youth, he played in the 1964 Quebec International Pee-Wee Hockey Tournament with the Toronto Shopsy's minor ice hockey team.

== Career statistics ==
=== Regular season and playoffs ===
			Regular season					Playoffs
Season	Team	League	GP	G	A	Pts	PIM	GP	G	A	Pts	PIM
1968–69	Humber Valley Packers	THL	—	—	—	—	—	—	—	—	—	—
1969–70	Niagara Falls Flyers	OHA	53	5	11	16	26	—	—	—	—	—
1970–71	Niagara Falls Flyers	OHA	59	3	27	30	69	—	—	—	—	—
1971–72	Niagara Falls Flyers	OHA	30	2	12	14	35	6	1	1	2	9
1972–73	Phoenix Roadrunners	WHL	62	14	22	36	36	6	1	1	2	4
1972–73	California Golden Seals	NHL	3	0	0	0	0	—	—	—	—	—
1973–74	Salt Lake Golden Eagles	WHL	65	15	37	52	44	5	1	0	1	4
1973–74	California Golden Seals	NHL	18	1	9	10	4	—	—	—	—	—
1974–75	Salt Lake Golden Eagles	CHL	75	18	39	57	72	11	1	8	9	14
1974–75	California Golden Seals	NHL	4	0	0	0	0	—	—	—	—	—
1975–76	Salt Lake Golden Eagles	CHL	76	23	39	62	71	5	1	3	4	0
1975–76	California Golden Seals	NHL	1	0	0	0	0	—	—	—	—	—
1976–77	Salt Lake Golden Eagles	CHL	26	5	16	21	24	—	—	—	—	—
1976–77	Cleveland Barons	NHL	49	8	13	21	4	—	—	—	—	—
1978–79	Mannheimer ERC	GER	51	18	3	21	118	—	—	—	—	—
1979–80	Mannheimer ERC	GER	48	13	31	44	135	—	—	—	—	—
1980–81	Mannheimer ERC	GER	43	11	31	42	110	10	0	4	4	12
NHL totals			75	9	22	31	8	—	—	—	—	—
