= Barry Cummins =

Canadian ice hockey player

- Born: January 25, 1949 (age 76); Regina, Saskatchewan, Canada
- Height: 5 ft 9 in (175 cm)
- Weight: 175 lb (79 kg; 12 st 7 lb)
- Position: Defence
- Shot: Left
- Played for: California Golden Seals
- NHL draft: Undrafted
- Playing career: 1969–1975

Barry Kenneth Cummins (born January 25, 1949) is a Canadian former professional ice hockey defenceman who played 36 games in the National Hockey League for the California Golden Seals during the 1973–74 season. The rest of his career, which lasted from 1969 to 1975, was spent in various minor leagues.

== Career statistics ==
=== Regular season and playoffs ===
			Regular season					Playoffs
Season	Team	League	GP	G	A	Pts	PIM	GP	G	A	Pts	PIM
1966–67	Regina Pats	SJHL	17	0	3	3	33	14	0	4	4	28
1967–68	Regina Pats	SJHL	50	7	13	20	174	—	—	—	—	—
1969–70	Saskatoon Blades	WCHL	34	9	25	34	123	—	—	—	—	—
1969–70	Muskegon Mohawks	IHL	8	0	0	0	8	—	—	—	—	—
1970–71	Portland Buckaroos	WHL	58	0	1	1	38	10	0	0	0	0
1971–72	Portland Buckaroos	WHL	53	0	8	8	78	—	—	—	—	—
1971–72	Seattle Totems	WHL	17	1	2	3	23	—	—	—	—	—
1972–73	Salt Lake Golden Eagles	WHL	72	4	18	22	190	9	0	2	2	17
1973–74	California Golden Seals	NHL	36	1	2	3	39	—	—	—	—	—
1973–74	Salt Lake Golden Eagles	WHL	37	2	12	14	100	5	0	1	1	8
1974–75	Springfield Indians	AHL	73	9	33	42	151	–	–	–	–	–
WHL totals			237	7	41	48	429	24	0	3	3	25
NHL totals			36	1	2	3	39	—	—	—	—	—
