= Lucien Grenier (ice hockey) =

Canadian ice hockey player

- Born: November 3, 1946 (age 79) Malartic, Quebec, Canada
- Height: 5 ft 10 in (178 cm)
- Weight: 160 lb (73 kg; 11 st 6 lb)
- Position: Right wing
- Shot: Left
- Played for: Montreal Canadiens; Los Angeles Kings
- Playing career: 1966–1975

Lucien Salomon Joseph Grenier (born November 3, 1946) is a Canadian former professional ice hockey winger. He played 152 games in the National Hockey League (NHL) with the Montreal Canadiens and Los Angeles Kings from 1969 to 1972. He won the Stanley Cup in 1969 with the Canadiens. Grenier only played two playoff games, and did not dress in the regular season; his name was left off the Cup although he qualified to be listed.

== Career statistics ==
=== Regular season and playoffs ===
			Regular season					Playoffs
Season	Team	League	GP	G	A	Pts	PIM	GP	G	A	Pts	PIM
1961–62	Quebec Citadelles	QPJHL	—	—	—	—	—	—	—	—	—	—
1961–62	Quebec Citadelles	M-Cup	—	—	—	—	—	9	0	4	4	12
1962–63	Quebec Citadelles	QPJHL	—	—	—	—	—	—	—	—	—	—
1963–64	Montreal NDG Monarchs	MMJHL	44	19	29	48	19	18	9	7	16	15
1963–64	Montreal NDG Monarchs	M-Cup	—	—	—	—	—	12	6	3	9	6
1964–65	Montreal Junior Canadiens	OHA	54	17	7	24	23	7	1	4	5	4
1965–66	Montreal Junior Canadiens	OHA	47	32	41	73	42	10	4	4	8	0
1966–67	Houston Apollos	CHL	58	16	18	34	20	6	1	0	1	2
1967–68	Houston Apollos	CHL	55	10	22	32	22	—	—	—	—	—
1968–69	Houston Apollos	CHL	56	17	23	40	22	3	1	0	1	0
1968–69	Montreal Canadiens	NHL	—	—	—	—	—	2	0	0	0	0
1969–70	Montreal Canadiens	NHL	23	2	3	5	2	—	—	—	—	—
1969–70	Montreal Voyageurs	AHL	25	12	8	20	4	—	—	—	—	—
1970–71	Los Angeles Kings	NHL	68	9	7	16	12	—	—	—	—	—
1971–72	Los Angeles Kings	NHL	60	3	4	7	4	—	—	—	—	—
1973–74	Omaha Knights	CHL	56	5	5	10	15	5	0	1	1	0
1974–75	Omaha Knights	CHL	31	4	3	7	4	—	—	—	—	—
NHL totals			152	14	14	28	18	2	0	0	0	0
