= 1972–73 New York Rangers season =

NHL hockey team season

1972–73 New York Rangers
- Division: 3rd East
- 1972–73 record: 47–23–8
- Home record: 26–8–5
- Road record: 21–15–3
- Goals for: 297
- Goals against: 208

Team information
- General manager: Emile Francis
- Coach: Emile Francis
- Captain: Vic Hadfield
- Alternate captains: Rod Gilbert; Brad Park
- Arena: Madison Square Garden

Team leaders
- Goals: Jean Ratelle (41)
- Assists: Rod Gilbert (59)
- Points: Jean Ratelle (94)
- Penalty minutes: Dale Rolfe (74)
- Wins: Ed Giacomin (26)
- Goals against average: Peter McDuffe (1.00)

The 1972–73 New York Rangers season was the franchise's 47th season.

== Regular season ==
=== Final standings ===
East Division
		GP	W	L	T	GF	GA	DIFF	Pts
1	Montreal Canadiens	78	52	10	16	329	184	+145	120
2	Boston Bruins	78	51	22	5	330	235	+95	107
3	New York Rangers	78	47	23	8	297	208	+89	102
4	Buffalo Sabres	78	37	27	14	257	219	+38	88
5	Detroit Red Wings	78	37	29	12	265	243	+22	86
6	Toronto Maple Leafs	78	27	41	10	247	279	−32	64
7	Vancouver Canucks	78	22	47	9	233	339	−106	53
8	New York Islanders	78	12	60	6	170	347	−177	30

=== Record vs. opponents ===
==== Vs. East Division ====
1972–73 NHL records
Team	BOS	BUF	DET	MTL	NYI	NYR	TOR	VAN	Total
Boston	—	4–1–1	3–2	1–3–1	5–1	3–3	4–1	4–1	24–12–2
Buffalo	1–4–1	—	1–4	1–2–2	5–0–1	5–1	4–1	3–2	20–14–4
Detroit	2–3	4–1	—	2–3–1	4–1	1–3–1	4–2	3–0–3	20–13–5
Montreal	3–1–1	2–1–2	3–2–1	—	5–0	3–0–2	5–0–1	6–0	27–4–7
N.Y. Islanders	1–5	0–5–1	1–4	0–5	—	0–6	1–4	1–3–1	4–32–2
N.Y. Rangers	3–3	1–5	3–1–1	0–3–2	6–0	—	4–1	3–2	20–15–3
Toronto	1–4	1–4	2–4	0–5–1	4–1	1–4	—	2–3–1	11–25–2
Vancouver	1–4	2–3	0–3–3	0–6	3–1–1	2–3	3–2–1	—	11–22–5

==== Vs. West Division ====
1972–73 NHL records
Team	ATL	CAL	CHI	LAK	MIN	PHI	PIT	STL	Total
Boston	5–0	4–0–1	2–3	3–2	3–1–1	4–0–1	4–1	2–3	27–10–3
Buffalo	2–1–2	1–2–2	2–3	2–1–2	3–2	2–3	3–0–2	2–1–2	17–13–10
Detroit	3–2	2–2–1	2–3	2–2–1	1–3–1	3–1–1	2–0–3	2–3	17–16–7
Montreal	3–0–2	3–0–2	2–3	4–0–1	3–1–1	2–2–1	5–0	3–0–2	25–6–9
N.Y. Islanders	0–4–1	4–1	0–4–1	1–4	1–4	1–4	0–4–1	1–3–1	8–28–4
N.Y. Rangers	4–1	3–1–1	2–2–1	3–0–2	3–2	4–0–1	3–2	5–0	27–8–5
Toronto	1–2–2	3–1–1	1–2–2	3–2	2–2–1	1–3–1	2–2–1	3–2	16–16–8
Vancouver	1–4	4–1	1–3–1	2–3	0–3–2	0–4–1	2–3	1–4	11–25–4

== Schedule and results ==
1972–73 regular season
October: 6–3–1 (home: 5–0–1; road: 1–3–0)

Game	October	Opponent	Score	Record
1	7	@ Detroit Red Wings	5–3	0–1–0
2	8	@ Chicago Black Hawks	5–1	0–2–0
3	11	Vancouver Canucks	5–3	1–2–0
4	14	@ Montreal Canadiens	6–1	1–3–0
5	15	Minnesota North Stars	6–2	2–3–0
6	18	Boston Bruins	7–1	3–3–0
7	21	@ New York Islanders	2–1	4–3–0
8	22	Montreal Canadiens	1–1	4–3–1
9	25	Philadelphia Flyers	6–1	5–3–1
10	29	Chicago Black Hawks	7–1	6–3–1

November: 9–4–1 (home: 5–1–0; road: 4–3–1)

Game	November	Opponent	Score	Record
11	1	@ Chicago Black Hawks	3–2	7–3–1
12	4	@ Pittsburgh Penguins	6–4	7–4–1
13	5	@ Philadelphia Flyers	3–2	8–4–1
14	8	Vancouver Canucks	5–2	9–4–1
15	11	California Golden Seals	7–2	10–4–1
16	12	Los Angeles Kings	5–1	11–4–1
17	15	Philadelphia Flyers	7–3	12–4–1
18	18	@ St. Louis Blues	3–1	13–4–1
19	19	Pittsburgh Penguins	5–3	13–5–1
20	21	@ Atlanta Flames	3–1	14–5–1
21	23	@ Buffalo Sabres	5–3	14–6–1
22	26	Toronto Maple Leafs	7–4	15–6–1
23	28	@ Vancouver Canucks	2–1	15–7–1
24	29	@ Los Angeles Kings	2–2	15–7–2

December: 8–5–1 (home: 5–3–0; road: 3–2–1)

Game	December	Opponent	Score	Record
25	1	@ California Golden Seals	3–3	15–7–3
26	3	Atlanta Flames	3–2	16–7–3
27	6	Buffalo Sabres	3–2	16–8–3
28	9	@ New York Islanders	4–1	17–8–3
29	10	New York Islanders	4–1	18–8–3
30	13	@ Toronto Maple Leafs	4–3	19–8–3
31	14	@ Boston Bruins	4–2	19–9–3
32	16	@ Minnesota North Stars	5–1	19–10–3
33	17	Pittsburgh Penguins	9–1	20–10–3
34	20	@ St. Louis Blues	5–4	21–10–3
35	21	Atlanta Flames	5–2	21–11–3
36	24	Detroit Red Wings	5–0	22–11–3
37	27	Buffalo Sabres	4–1	22–12–3
38	31	St. Louis Blues	6–1	23–12–3

January: 11–1–1 (home: 5–1–0; road: 6–0–1)

Game	January	Opponent	Score	Record
39	3	Los Angeles Kings	3–0	24–12–3
40	6	Buffalo Sabres	4–1	24–13–3
41	7	Pittsburgh Penguins	3–0	25–13–3
42	11	@ Buffalo Sabres	4–2	26–13–3
43	13	@ St. Louis Blues	5–3	27–13–3
44	14	@ Philadelphia Flyers	5–2	28–13–3
45	17	@ Los Angeles Kings	4–4	28–13–4
46	19	@ California Golden Seals	6–0	29–13–4
47	20	@ Vancouver Canucks	4–3	30–13–4
48	24	Boston Bruins	4–2	31–13–4
49	27	@ Detroit Red Wings	6–3	32–13–4
50	28	Toronto Maple Leafs	5–2	33–13–4
51	31	California Golden Seals	3–1	34–13–4

February: 7–3–2 (home: 4–0–2; road: 3–3–0)

Game	February	Opponent	Score	Record
52	3	@ Boston Bruins	7–3	35–13–4
53	4	Atlanta Flames	6–0	36–13–4
54	7	New York Islanders	6–0	37–13–4
55	10	@ New York Islanders	6–0	38–13–4
56	11	Montreal Canadiens	2–2	38–13–5
57	14	@ Montreal Canadiens	6–3	38–14–5
58	15	@ Buffalo Sabres	4–1	38–15–5
59	18	New York Islanders	3–2	39–15–5
60	21	@ Los Angeles Kings	4–3	40–15–5
61	23	@ California Golden Seals	5–3	40–16–5
62	25	Minnesota North Stars	6–5	41–16–5
63	28	Chicago Black Hawks	3–3	41–16–6

March: 6–7–1 (home: 2–3–1; road: 4–4–0)

Game	March	Opponent	Score	Record
64	3	@ Detroit Red Wings	6–3	42–16–6
65	4	Vancouver Canucks	4–3	42–17–6
66	7	Philadelphia Flyers	2–2	42–17–7
67	10	@ Pittsburgh Penguins	5–4	43–17–7
68	11	Toronto Maple Leafs	4–2	44–17–7
69	14	@ Chicago Black Hawks	4–2	44–18–7
70	17	@ Toronto Maple Leafs	7–5	44–19–7
71	18	St. Louis Blues	3–1	45–19–7
72	20	@ Minnesota North Stars	6–1	46–19–7
73	22	@ Atlanta Flames	4–1	47–19–7
74	24	@ Boston Bruins	3–0	47–20–7
75	25	Minnesota North Stars	2–1	47–21–7
76	28	Boston Bruins	6–3	47–22–7
77	31	@ Montreal Canadiens	5–1	47–23–7

April: 0–0–1 (home: 0–0–1; road: 0-0-0)

Game	April	Opponent	Score	Record
78	1	Detroit Red Wings	3–3	47–23–8

Legend: Win (2 points) Loss (0 points) Tie (1 point)

== Playoffs ==
1973 Stanley Cup playoffs
Quarterfinals vs. (E2) Boston Bruins – Rangers win 4–1

Game	Date	Visitor	Score	Home	OT	Series
1	April 4	New York Rangers	6–2	Boston Bruins		New York Rangers lead series 1–0
2	April 5	New York Rangers	4–2	Boston Bruins		New York Rangers lead series 2–0
3	April 7	Boston Bruins	4–2	New York Rangers		New York Rangers lead series 2–1
4	April 8	Boston Bruins	0–4	New York Rangers		New York Rangers lead series 3–1
5	April 10	New York Rangers	6–3	Boston Bruins		New York Rangers win series 4–1

Semifinals vs. (W1) Chicago Black Hawks – Black Hawks win 4–1

Game	Date	Visitor	Score	Home	OT	Series
1	April 12	New York Rangers	4–1	Chicago Black Hawks		New York Rangers lead series 1–0
2	April 15	New York Rangers	4–5	Chicago Black Hawks		Series tied 1–1
3	April 17	Chicago Black Hawks	2–1	New York Rangers		Chicago leads series 2–1
4	April 19	Chicago Black Hawks	3–1	New York Rangers		Chicago leads series 3–1
5	April 24	New York Rangers	1–4	Chicago Black Hawks		Chicago wins series 4–1

Legend: Win Loss

== Player statistics ==
Skaters

Regular season
Player	GP	G	A	Pts	PIM
Jean Ratelle	78	41	53	94	12
Rod Gilbert	76	25	59	84	25
Walt Tkaczuk	76	27	39	66	59
Bill Fairbairn	78	30	33	63	23
Vic Hadfield	63	28	34	62	60
Pete Stemkowski	78	22	37	59	71
Steve Vickers	61	30	23	53	37
Brad Park	52	10	43	53	51
Bobby Rousseau	78	8	37	45	14
Rod Seiling	72	9	33	42	36
Dale Rolfe	72	7	25	32	74
Bruce MacGregor	52	14	12	26	12
Glen Sather	77	11	15	26	64
Ted Irvine	53	8	12	20	54
Jim Neilson	52	4	16	20	35
Gene Carr	50	9	10	19	50
Ab DeMarco^{‡}	51	4	13	17	15
Ron Harris^{†}	46	3	10	13	17
Mike Murphy^{†}	15	4	4	8	5
Randy Legge	12	0	2	2	2
Bill Heindl	4	1	0	1	0
Jerry Butler	8	1	0	1	4
Larry Sacharuk	8	1	0	1	0
Sheldon Kannegiesser^{†}	3	0	1	1	4
Tom Williams	10	0	1	1	0
Ron Stewart^{‡}	11	0	1	1	0
Curt Bennett^{‡}	16	0	1	1	11
Bert Marshall^{†}	8	0	0	0	14

Playoffs
Player	GP	G	A	Pts	PIM
Steve Vickers	10	5	4	9	4
Bill Fairbairn	10	1	8	9	2
Walt Tkaczuk	10	7	2	9	8
Jean Ratelle	10	2	7	9	0
Brad Park	10	2	5	7	8
Pete Stemkowski	10	4	2	6	6
Rod Gilbert	10	5	1	6	2
Dale Rolfe	8	0	5	5	6
Bobby Rousseau	10	2	3	5	4
Jim Neilson	10	0	4	4	2
Ted Irvine	10	1	3	4	20
Bruce MacGregor	10	2	2	4	2
Vic Hadfield	9	2	2	4	11
Ron Harris	10	0	3	3	2
Bert Marshall	6	0	1	1	8
Gene Carr	1	0	1	1	0
Sheldon Kannegiesser	1	0	0	0	2
Mike Murphy	10	0	0	0	0
Glen Sather	9	0	0	0	7

Goaltenders

Regular season
Player	GP	TOI	W	L	T	GA	GAA	SO
Ed Giacomin	43	2580	26	11	6	125	2.91	4
Gilles Villemure	34	2040	20	12	2	78	2.29	3
Peter McDuffe	1	60	1	0	0	1	1.00	0

Playoffs
Player	GP	TOI	W	L	GA	GAA	SO
Ed Giacomin	10	539	5	4	23	2.56	1
Gilles Villemure	2	61	0	1	2	1.97	0

^{†}Denotes player spent time with another team before joining Rangers. Stats reflect time with Rangers only.
^{‡}Traded mid-season. Stats reflect time with Rangers only.

Note:

Pos = Position;GP = Games played; G = Goals; A = Assists; Pts = Points; PIM = Penalty minutes; +/- = Plus/minus; PPG = Power-play goals; SHG = Short-handed goals; GWG = Game-winning goals
Pos = Position;GP = Games played; Min, TOI = Minutes played; W = Wins; L = Losses; T,T/OT = Ties; OTL = Overtime losses; GA = Goals-against; GAA = Goals-against average; SO = Shutouts; SA = Shots against; SV = Shots saved;SV% = Save percentage;

== Transactions ==
The Rangers defense lost their gifted-defenseman, Brad Park due to a knee injury that occurred on 11/15/72 against the Flyers, which forced him out of the lineup for the next 18 games. Looking to plug that hole, they searched around the league for another talented-defenseman but prospects were sparse. So, on 11/28/72, they settled on veteran defenseman Ron Harris of the Flames who had minimal offensive skills but played a physical checking game. A 26-year-old forward, by the name of Curt Bennett was still scoreless with the Rangers while mostly sitting on the bench, so he was sent to the Flames in exchange. Both guys ultimately paid dividends for their new teams. Harris was instrumental in winning key games for the Rangers in different ways such as: against the rival-Bruins in game #2 of the 1973 playoffs, he threw a legal, rolling, hip-check at Phil Esposito which injured him, thus, sinking the hopes of the Bruins since they lost that playoff series; plus then, in a key 1974 playoff game against the Canadians, Harris scored the game-winning goal in overtime which eventually sparked the Rangers in winning that playoff series. Likewise, the Flames cashed in on Curt Bennett since he finally and quickly matured with them by becoming an excellent goal-scorer and their toughest fighter.

== Draft picks ==
New York's picks at the 1972 NHL amateur draft in Montreal, Canada.

Round	#	Player	Position	Nationality	College/Junior/Club team (League)
1	10	Al Blanchard	LW	Canada	Kitchener Rangers (OHA)
1	15	Bob MacMillan	C	Canada	St. Catharines Black Hawks (OHA)
2	21	Larry Sacharuk	D	Canada	Saskatoon Blades (WCHL)
2	31	Rene Villemure	LW	Canada	Shawinigan Bruins (QMJHL)
3	47	Gerry Teeple	C	Canada	Cornwall Royals (QMJHL)
4	63	Doug Horbul	LW	Canada	Calgary Centennials (WCHL)
5	79	Marty Gateman	D	Canada	Hamilton Red Wings (OHA)
6	95	Ken Ireland	C	Canada	New Westminster Bruins (WCHL)
7	111	Jeff Hunt	D	Canada	Winnipeg Jets (WCHL)
8	127	Yvon Blais	D	Canada	Cornwall Royals (QMJHL)
9	137	Pierre Archambault	D	Canada	Saint-Jerome Alouettes (QMJHL)

== See also ==
- 1972–73 NHL season
