= 1973 Stanley Cup Final =

1973 ice hockey championship series

	1	2	3	4	5	6	Total
Montreal Canadiens	8	4	4	4	7	6	4
Chicago Black Hawks	3	1	7	0	8	4	2
- Location(s): Montreal: Montreal Forum (1, 2, 5); Chicago: Chicago Stadium (3, 4, 6)
- Coaches: Montreal: Scotty Bowman; Chicago: Bill Reay
- Captains: Montreal: Henri Richard; Chicago: Vacant
- Dates: April 29 – May 10, 1973
- MVP: Yvan Cournoyer (Canadiens)
- Series-winning goal: Yvan Cournoyer (8:13, third)
- Hall of Famers: Canadiens: Yvan Cournoyer (1982); Ken Dryden (1983); Guy Lafleur (1988); Jacques Laperriere (1987); Guy Lapointe (1993); Jacques Lemaire (1984); Frank Mahovlich (1981); Henri Richard (1979); Larry Robinson (1995); Serge Savard (1986); Steve Shutt (1993; did not play); Black Hawks: Tony Esposito (1988); Stan Mikita (1983); Coaches: Scotty Bowman (1991); Officials: Neil Armstrong (1991); John D'Amico (1993); Matt Pavelich (1987)
- Networks: CBC (Canada); NBC (United States, games 1, 4–6)
- Announcers: (CBC) Danny Gallivan and Dick Irvin Jr. (NBC) Tim Ryan, Ted Lindsay, and Brian McFarlane

The 1973 Stanley Cup Final was the championship series of the National Hockey League's (NHL) 1972–73 season, and the culmination of the 1973 Stanley Cup playoffs. It was contested between the Chicago Black Hawks and the Montreal Canadiens, a rematch of the 1971 Final. The Canadiens won the best-of-seven series, four games to two to win their 18th Stanley Cup championship.

== Paths to the Finals ==
Chicago defeated the St. Louis Blues 4–1 and the New York Rangers 4–1 to advance to the final.

Montreal defeated the Buffalo Sabres 4–2 and the Philadelphia Flyers 4–1 to set up an "Original Six" final.

== Game summaries ==
Yvan Cournoyer and Jacques Lemaire both had 12 points in the finals for the Canadiens. The Conn Smythe Trophy went to Cournoyer, who had six goals. It was Henri Richard's eleventh and last win of the Stanley Cup and Scotty Bowman's first.

=== Game one ===
April 29	Chicago Black Hawks	3–8	Montreal Canadiens	Montreal Forum	Recap

Jacques Lemaire recorded 4 points in game one for Montreal in an 8–3 victory over Chicago to take a 1–0 series lead.

Scoring summary
Period	Team	Goal	Assist(s)	Time	Score
1st	CHI	Pit Martin (6)	Pat Stapleton (8) and Dennis Hull (12)	00:35	1–0 CHI
1st	CHI	Ralph Backstrom (5)	Pat Stapleton (9)	01:02	2–0 CHI
1st	MTL	Jacques Laperriere (1)	Unassisted	02:28	2–1 CHI
1st	MTL	Marc Tardif (4)	Guy Lafleur (4) and Rejean Houle (5)	08:07	2–2
1st	CHI	Pit Martin (7)	Pat Stapleton (10) and Bill White (3)	12:07	3–2 CHI
2nd	MTL	Chuck Lefley (1)	Yvan Cournoyer (5) and Jacques Lemaire (5)	03:01	3–3
2nd	MTL	Jacques Lemaire (5) – pp	Henri Richard (4) and Marc Tardif (4)	16:23	4–3 MTL
3rd	MTL	Jacques Lemaire (6) – pp	Frank Mahovlich (9) and Pete Mahovlich (5)	08:38	5–3 MTL
3rd	MTL	Pete Mahovlich (2) – sh	Unassisted	12:36	6–3 MTL
3rd	MTL	Frank Mahovlich (5)	Guy Lafleur (5) and Rejean Houle (6)	13:34	7–3 MTL
3rd	MTL	Chuck Lefley (2)	Jacques Lemaire (6) and Yvan Cournoyer (6)	14:35	8–3 MTL
Penalty summary
Period	Team	Player	Penalty	Time	PIM
1st	CHI	John Marks	Tripping	06:05	2:00
1st	MTL	Chuck Lefley	Tripping	11:51	2:00
2nd	CHI	Phil Russell	Slashing	03:31	2:00
2nd	CHI	Cliff Koroll	Slashing	14:36	2:00
3rd	CHI	Phil Russell	High-sticking	02:11	2:00
3rd	MTL	Marc Tardif	Slashing	05:09	2:00
3rd	CHI	Phil Russell	Interference	07:29	2:00
3rd	MTL	Guy Lapointe	Interference	10:45	2:00

Shots by period
Team	1	2	3	Total
Chicago	9	14	7	30
Montreal	9	13	16	38

=== Game two ===
May 1	Chicago Black Hawks	1–4	Montreal Canadiens	Montreal Forum	Recap

In game two, Yvan Cournoyer scored twice, the Ken Dryden and the Montreal defense stood tall, and the Canadiens won the game 4–1.

Scoring summary
Period	Team	Goal	Assist(s)	Time	Score
1st	MTL	Pierre Bouchard (1)	Claude Larose (1) and Pete Mahovlich (6)	05:36	1–0 MTL
2nd	CHI	Cliff Koroll (4)	Dick Redmond (3) and Lou Angotti (4)	07:28	1–1
2nd	MTL	Yvan Cournoyer (10)	Frank Mahovlich (10)	12:08	2–1 MTL
3rd	MTL	Yvan Cournoyer (11) – pp	Guy Lapointe (5) and Jacques Lemaire (7)	05:01	3–1 MTL
3rd	MTL	Frank Mahovlich (6) – en	Unassisted	19:26	4–1 MTL
Penalty summary
Period	Team	Player	Penalty	Time	PIM
1st	CHI	Phil Russell	Tripping	11:55	2:00
1st	CHI	Phil Russell	High-sticking	15:57	2:00
2nd	MTL	Guy Lapointe	Tripping	17:01	2:00
3rd	CHI	Dennis Hull	Tripping	04:47	2:00
3rd	CHI	Phil Russell	Holding	07:05	2:00
3rd	MTL	Serge Savard	Elbowing	13:10	2:00
3rd	MTL	Larry Robinson	Interference	13:55	2:00
3rd	CHI	Pit Martin	Hooking	14:21	2:00

Shots by period
Team	1	2	3	Total
Chicago	5	8	6	19
Montreal	9	11	10	30

=== Game three ===
May 3	Montreal Canadiens	4–7	Chicago Black Hawks	Chicago Stadium	Recap

The Black Hawks took a commanding 5–0 lead in game three before Montreal scored 4 unanswered goals to cut the deficit, but Chicago sealed their victory with two empty net goals from Dennis Hull and Jim Pappin.

Scoring summary
Period	Team	Goal	Assist(s)	Time	Score
1st	CHI	Dennis Hull (7) – pp	Jim Pappin (6) and Pat Stapleton (11)	01:59	1–0 CHI
1st	CHI	J.P. Bordeleau (1) – pp	Stan Mikita (9) and Cliff Koroll (5)	11:44	2–0 CHI
1st	CHI	Bill White (1) – sh	Pat Stapleton (12) and Ralph Backstrom (4)	13:20	3–0 CHI
1st	CHI	Stan Mikita (5) – sh	Cliff Koroll (6) and Bill White (4)	14:20	4–0 CHI
2nd	CHI	John Marks (1) – pp	Len Frig (1) and Stan Mikita (10)	02:08	5–0 CHI
2nd	MTL	Frank Mahovlich (7)	Pete Mahovlich (7) and Larry Robinson (3)	10:25	5–1 CHI
3rd	MTL	Yvan Cournoyer (12)	Jacques Lemaire (8) and Chuck Lefley (3)	01:20	5–2 CHI
3rd	MTL	Guy Lapointe (6)	Frank Mahovlich (11) and Claude Larose (2)	07:15	5–3 CHI
3rd	MTL	Jacques Lemaire (7)	Yvan Cournoyer (7) and Marc Tardif (5)	08:01	5–4 CHI
3rd	CHI	Dennis Hull (8) – en	Unassisted	19:29	6–4 CHI
3rd	CHI	Jim Pappin (6) – en	Dennis Hull (13)	19:49	7–4 CHI
Penalty summary
Period	Team	Player	Penalty	Time	PIM
1st	MTL	Claude Larose	High-sticking	00:45	2:00
1st	CHI	J.P. Bordeleau	Tripping	09:37	2:00
1st	MTL	Pete Mahovlich	Holding	10:31	2:00
1st	MTL	Pete Mahovlich	Misconduct	10:31	10:00
1st	CHI	Dennis Hull	Slashing	12:39	2:00
2nd	MTL	Serge Savard	Hooking	01:08	2:00
2nd	CHI	Jerry Korab	Elbowing	02:50	2:00
2nd	MTL	Serge Savard	Hooking	06:12	2:00
2nd	CHI	Pat Stapleton	Holding	07:38	2:00
2nd	MTL	Guy Lapointe	Tripping	13:42	2:00
3rd	None				

Shots by period
Team	1	2	3	Total
Montreal	8	14	11	33
Chicago	16	13	8	37

=== Game four ===
May 6	Montreal Canadiens	4–0	Chicago Black Hawks	Chicago Stadium	Recap

In game four, Ken Dryden made 19 saves to record his first career playoff shutout, and the Canadiens won the game 4–0.

Scoring summary
Period	Team	Goal	Assist(s)	Time	Score
1st	MTL	Marc Tardif (5)	Yvan Cournoyer (8) and Jacques Lemaire (9)	01:08	1–0 MTL
2nd	MTL	Yvan Cournoyer (13)	Marc Tardif (6)	14:13	2–0 MTL
2nd	MTL	Chuck Lefley (3)	Pete Mahovlich (8) and Claude Larose (3)	15:43	3–0 MTL
3rd	MTL	Claude Larose (1)	Jacques Lemaire (10)	03:45	4–0 MTL
Penalty summary
Period	Team	Player	Penalty	Time	PIM
1st	MTL	Bob Murdoch	Charging	02:05	2:00
1st	CHI	Pat Stapleton	Holding	13:32	2:00
2nd	MTL	Marc Tardif	Interference	02:27	2:00
2nd	MTL	Guy Lapointe	Tripping	11:08	2:00
3rd	MTL	Pierre Bouchard	Interference	15:26	2:00

Shots by period
Team	1	2	3	Total
Montreal	10	14	6	30
Chicago	5	7	7	19

=== Game five ===
May 8	Chicago Black Hawks	8–7	Montreal Canadiens	Montreal Forum	Recap

In game five, Claude Larose recorded three points for Montreal. For Chicago, Jim Pappin scored twice, Stan Mikita recorded 4 points, and the Black Hawks took down the Canadiens by a score of 8–7. With both teams combining for a total 15 goals, this was the highest scoring game in Stanley Cup Final history.

Scoring summary
Period	Team	Goal	Assist(s)	Time	Score
1st	MTL	Frank Mahovlich (8)	Unassisted	02:47	1–0 MTL
1st	CHI	Dennis Hull (9)	Doug Jarrett (3) and Phil Russell (3)	09:34	1–1
1st	CHI	Stan Mikita (6)	Pat Stapleton (13)	11:24	2–1 CHI
1st	MTL	Pete Mahovlich (3) – pp	Frank Mahovlich (12) and Larry Robinson (4)	14:52	2–2
2nd	MTL	Claude Larose (2)	Unassisted	00:37	3–2 MTL
2nd	CHI	Dave Kryskow (1)	Ralph Backstrom (5) and Chico Maki (7)	03:10	3–3
2nd	MTL	Claude Larose (3)	Murray Wilson (3)	04:23	4–3 MTL
2nd	CHI	Stan Mikita (7)	Pat Stapleton (14) and John Marks (2)	06:21	4–4
2nd	MTL	Yvan Cournoyer (14)	Jacques Lemaire (11) and Guy Lapointe (6)	07:09	5–4 MTL
2nd	CHI	Jim Pappin (7)	Unassisted	11:24	5–5
2nd	CHI	Len Frig (1) – pp	Stan Mikita (11)	16:21	6–5 CHI
2nd	CHI	Jim Pappin (8)	Stan Mikita (12) and Dennis Hull (14)	19:03	7–5 CHI
3rd	MTL	Serge Savard (3)	Murray Wilson (4) and Claude Larose (4)	01:15	7–6 MTL
3rd	CHI	Lou Angotti (3)	Bill White (5)	09:34	8–6 CHI
3rd	MTL	Henri Richard (5)	Frank Mahovlich (13)	11:43	8–7 CHI
Penalty summary
Period	Team	Player	Penalty	Time	PIM
1st	CHI	J.P. Bordeleau	Tripping	12:52	2:00
1st	CHI	Jim Pappin	Misconduct	15:57	10:00
2nd	MTL	Pierre Bouchard	Interference	15:14	2:00
3rd	None				

Shots by period
Team	1	2	3	Total
Chicago	11	11	7	29
Montreal	6	17	8	31

=== Game six ===
May 10	Montreal Canadiens	6–4	Chicago Black Hawks	Chicago Stadium	Recap

Pit Martin recorded a hat trick in game six for Chicago. However, it would be the Canadiens that emerge victorious, winning their second Stanley Cup in two years. Yvan Cournoyer, who scored the game-winning goal in the third period, would be awarded the Conn Smythe Trophy as playoffs MVP.

Scoring summary
Period	Team	Goal	Assist(s)	Time	Score
1st	CHI	Pit Martin (8)	Stan Mikita (13) and Pat Stapleton (15)	10:35	1–0 CHI
1st	CHI	Pit Martin (9) – pp	Jim Pappin (7)	11:31	2–0 CHI
1st	MTL	Henri Richard (6)	Frank Mahovlich (14)	19:48	2–1 CHI
2nd	MTL	Pete Mahovlich (4)	Jacques Laperriere (3) and Chuck Lefley (4)	05:05	2–2
2nd	MTL	Rejean Houle (3)	Pete Mahovlich (9) and Chuck Lefley (5)	06:37	3–2 MTL
2nd	CHI	Dave Kryskow (2)	Chico Maki (8) and Ralph Backstrom (6)	08:32	3–3
2nd	MTL	Frank Mahovlich (9) – pp	Guy Lapointe (7) and Yvan Cournoyer (9)	10:54	4–3 MTL
2nd	CHI	Pit Martin (10) – pp	Dennis Hull (15)	17:05	4–4
3rd	MTL	Yvan Cournoyer (15)	Jacques Lemaire (12)	08:13	5–4 MTL
3rd	MTL	Marc Tardif (6) – pp	Yvan Cournoyer (10) and Jacques Lemaire (13)	12:42	6–4 MTL
Penalty summary
Period	Team	Player	Penalty	Time	PIM
1st	CHI	Jerry Korab	Roughing	03:40	2:00
1st	MTL	Jim Roberts	Roughing	03:40	2:00
1st	CHI	Pit Martin	Holding	08:21	2:00
1st	MTL	Jim Roberts	Hooking	10:35	2:00
1st	MTL	Murray Wilson	Elbowing	12:29	2:00
2nd	CHI	Bill White	Interference	02:25	2:00
2nd	CHI	Phil Russell	Holding	10:20	2:00
2nd	CHI	Jerry Korab	Hooking	12:26	2:00
2nd	MTL	Jim Roberts	Tripping	16:58	2:00
3rd	CHI	Phil Russell	Hooking	11:29	2:00

Shots by period
Team	1	2	3	Total
Montreal	7	15	11	33
Chicago	9	14	4	27

== Team rosters ==
=== Montreal Canadiens ===
No.	Nat	Player	Pos	S/G	Age	Acquired	Birthplace
1	(Canada)	Michel Plasse	G	L	24	1968	Montreal, Quebec
2	(Canada)	Jacques Laperriere	D	L	31	1962	Béarn, Quebec
5	(Canada)	Guy Lapointe	D	L	25	1969	Montreal, Quebec
6	(Canada)	Jimmy Roberts	RW	R	33	1971	Toronto, Ontario
10	(Canada)	Guy Lafleur	RW	R	21	1971	Thurso, Quebec
11	(Canada)	Marc Tardif	LW	L	23	1969	Granby, Quebec
12	(Canada)	Yvan Cournoyer (A)	RW	L	29	1963	Montreal, Quebec
14	(Canada)	Rejean Houle	RW	L	23	1969	Rouyn, Quebec
15	(Canada)	Claude Larose	RW	R	31	1962	Hearst, Ontario
16	(Canada)	Henri Richard (C)	C	R	37	1955	Montreal, Quebec
17	(Canada)	Murray Wilson	LW	L	21	1971	Toronto, Canada
18	(Canada)	Serge Savard	D	L	27	1966	Landrienne, Quebec
19	(Canada)	Larry Robinson	D	L	21	1971	Winchester, Ontario
20	(Canada)	Peter Mahovlich	C	L	26	1969	Timmins, Ontario
22	(Canada)	Steve Shutt	LW	L	20	1972	North York, Ontario
23	(Canada)	Bob Murdoch	D	R	26	1973	Kirkland Lake, Ontario
24	(Canada)	Chuck Lefley	LW	L	23	1970	Winnipeg, Manitoba
25	(Canada)	Jacques Lemaire	C	L	27	1967	LaSalle, Quebec
26	(Canada)	Pierre Bouchard	D	L	25	1965	Longueuil, Quebec
27	(Canada)	Frank Mahovlich (A)	LW	L	26	1969	Timmins, Ontario
29	(Canada)	Ken Dryden	G	L	25	1964	Hamilton, Ontario

=== Chicago Black Hawks ===
No.	Nat	Player	Pos	S/G	Age	Acquired	Birthplace
1	(Canada)	Gary Smith	G	L	29	1971	Ottawa, Ontario
2	(Canada)	Bill White (A)	D	R	33	1970	Toronto, Ontario
3	(Canada)	Keith Magnuson	D	R	26	1969	Wadena, Saskatchewan
4	(Canada)	Doug Jarrett (A)	D	L	29	1964	London, Ontario
5	(Canada)	Phil Russell	D	L	20	1972	Edmonton, Alberta
6	(Canada)	Lou Angotti	C	L	35	1969	Toronto, Ontario
7	(Canada)	Pit Martin	C	L	29	1967	Noranda, Quebec
8	(Canada)	Jim Pappin	RW	R	33	1968	Sudbury, Ontario
10	(Canada)	Dennis Hull	LW	L	28	1964	Point Anne, Ontario
11	(Canada)	John Marks	LW	L	25	1968	Hamiota, Manitoba
12	(Canada)	Pat Stapleton	D	L	32	1965	Sarnia, Ontario
14	(Canada)	Ralph Backstrom	C	L	35	1973	Kirkland Lake, Ontario
15	(Canada)	Dick Redmond	LW	L	23	1972	Kirkland Lake, Ontario
16	(Canada)	Chico Maki	RW	R	33	1961	Sault Ste. Marie, Ontario
17	(Canada)	Dave Kryskow	LW	L	21	1971	Edmonton, Alberta
19	(Canada)	Len Frig	D	L	22	1970	Blairmore, Alberta
20	(Canada)	Cliff Koroll	RW	R	26	1969	Canora, Saskatchewan
21	(Canada)	Stan Mikita (A)	C	R	32	1958	Sokolče, Slovak Republic
22	(Canada)	Jerry Korab	D	L	24	1970	Sault Ste. Marie, Ontario
23	(Canada)	J.P. Bordeleau	RW	R	23	1969	Noranda, Quebec
35	(Canada)	Tony Esposito	G	R	30	1969	Sault Ste. Marie, Ontario

== Stanley Cup engraving ==
The 1973 Stanley Cup was presented to Canadiens captain Henri Richard by NHL President Clarence Campbell following the Canadiens 6–4 win over the Black Hawks in game six.

The following Canadiens players and staff had their names engraved on the Stanley Cup

1972–73 Montreal Canadiens

=== Players ===
Centres

- 14 Rejean Houle
- 16 Henri Richard (Captain)
- 20 Peter Mahovlich
- 25 Jacques Lemaire

Wingers

- 6 Jim Roberts
- 10 Guy Lafleur
- 11 Marc Tardif
- 12 Yvan Cournoyer (A)
- 15 Claude Larose
- 17 Murray Wilson
- 22 Steve Shutt
- 24 Chuck Lefley
- 27 Frank Mahovlich (A)

Defencemen

- 2 Jacques Laperriere
- 5 Guy Lapointe
- 18 Serge Savard
- 19 Larry Robinson
- 23 Bob Murdoch
- 26 Pierre Bouchard

Goaltenders

- 1 Michel Plasse
- 29 Ken Dryden

=== Coaching and administrative staff ===
- Jacques Courtois (President), Jean Beliveau (Vice President – Director of Cooperate Relations)
- Peter Bronfman (Chairman/owner), Sam Pollock (Vice President/General Manager)
- Edward Bronfman (Executive Director/owner), Scotty Bowman (Head Coach)
- Bob Williams (Trainer), Eddy Palchak (Asst. Trainer)

=== Stanley Cup engraving ===
- Murray Wilson's name was misspelled in 1973, 1976, 1977 as MURRY WILSON missing an "A". Murray Wilson was spelled correctly on the Stanley Cup in 1978. Wilson's name was also spelled correctly all 4 times on the Replica Cup.
- Assistant General Managers Ron Caron and Floyd Curry were not included on the Stanley Cup, but qualified to be on it.
- On the Replica Stanley Cup created in 1992–93 Bob Murdoch's name was spelled BOB MURDOCK with a "K" instead of a "H". His name was correct on the original engraving in 1973.
- #30 Wayne Thomas (G) and #3 Dale Hodgson (D) were included in the team picture, but did not play enough games to get their name on the Stanley Cup.

== See also ==
- 1972–73 NHL season
- 1972–73 Chicago Black Hawks season
- 1972–73 Montreal Canadiens season

== Notes ==
Preceded by Boston Bruins; 1972	Montreal Canadiens; Stanley Cup champions 1973	Succeeded by Philadelphia Flyers; 1974
