= 22nd National Hockey League All-Star Game =

Professional ice hockey exhibition game

22nd NHL All-Star Game
	1	2	3	Total
West	1	1	1	3
East	1	0	2	3
- Date: January 21, 1969
- Arena: Montreal Forum
- City: Montreal
- MVP: Frank Mahovlich (Detroit)
- Attendance: 16,260

The 22nd National Hockey League All-Star Game was held in the Montreal Forum in Montreal, home of the Stanley Cup champion Montreal Canadiens, on January 21, 1969. The East Division All-Stars tied the West Division All-Stars 3–3. This was the first All-Star Game played under a divisional format, and the final All-Star Game to end in a tie. Frank Mahovlich was named the game's most valuable player.

== League business ==
After governor discussions at the concurrent semi-annual meeting, Clarence Campbell, president of the NHL, gave the Oakland Seals one month to come up with proper financing and improve its management to be allowed to continue play.

== Uniforms ==
The East Division All-Stars continued to wear the uniforms worn by the NHL All-Stars since 1964. The only change to the uniform was the addition of the player's name on the back. As the NHL continued to reuse the actual sweaters from previous All-Star Games, the addition of names necessitated a large nameplate to cover the stars on the back of the jersey. The names were displayed in black letters with orange outlines.

For the West Division, new uniforms were created, following the same basic design as the existing uniforms, but in navy blue with orange and white trim. The player numbers were rendered in orange with a triple outline of navy-white-orange, in contrast to the East uniforms which continued to use plain black numbers. The names were displayed in white letters with orange outlines.

The East Division uniforms would receive a slight update in 1971, while the West uniforms remained unchanged through 1972.

== The game ==
=== Summary ===
#	Score	Team	Goalscorer (assist(s))	Time
First period
		East	Goaltender in: Giacomin	0:00
		West	Goaltender in: Hall	0:00
1	0–1	West	Goal: Berenson (Harvey, Picard)	4:43
	0–1	West	Penalty: Vadnais	12:55
2	1–1	East	Goal: Mahovlich (Rousseau, Stapleton)	17:32
Second period
	1–1	East	Goaltender out: Giacomin; Goaltender in: Cheevers	0:00
	1–1	West	Goaltender out: Hall; Goaltender in: Parent	0:00
3	1–2	West	Goal: Roberts (Berenson, Picard)	1:53
	1–2	East	Penalty: Horton	11:41
	1–2	West	Penalty: White	17:50
Third period
	1–2	East	Goaltender out: Cheevers; Goaltender in: Giacomin	0:00
	1–2	West	Goaltender out: Parent; Goaltender in: Plante	0:00
4	2–2	East	Goal: Mahovlich (Harris, Gilbert)	3:11
5	3–2	East	Goal: Nevin (Ullman)	7:20
	3–2	West	Penalty: White	10:18
	3–2	West	Penalty: Harvey	11:55
6	3–3	West	Goal: Larose (Grant, O'Shea)	17:07
	3–3	East	Penalty: Horton	18:46
Goaltenders
East: Giacomin (40:00 minutes), Cheevers (20:00 minutes).; West: Hall (20:00 minutes), Parent (20:00 minutes), Plante (20:00 minutes).
Shots on goal
East (37) 12 – 10 – 15; West (27) 10 – 10 – 7
Officials
Referee: John Ashley Linesmen: Neil Armstrong, Matt Pavelich

Source: Podnieks

== Team lineups ==
Al Arbour made his debut in the All-Star Game at age 36, the eldest to debut in the game to that date. Toe Blake, who had retired after the Canadiens' championship, came out of retirement to coach the East Division.

=== East Division All-Stars ===
- Coach: Toe Blake (Montreal Canadiens)

#	Nat.	Player	Pos.	Team
Goaltenders
1	(Canada)	Ed Giacomin		New York Rangers
30	(Canada)	Gerry Cheevers		Boston Bruins
Defencemen
2	(Canada)	Bobby Orr		Boston Bruins
3	(Canada)	J. C. Tremblay		Montreal Canadiens
5	(Canada)	Ted Harris		Montreal Canadiens
6	(Canada)	Ted Green		Boston Bruins
7	(Canada)	Tim Horton		Toronto Maple Leafs
12	(Canada)	Pat Stapleton		Chicago Black Hawks
Forwards
4	(Canada)	Jean Beliveau	C	Montreal Canadiens
8	(Canada)	Bob Nevin	RW	New York Rangers
9	(Canada)	Gordie Howe	RW	Detroit Red Wings
10	(Canada)	Dennis Hull	LW	Chicago Black Hawks
12	(Canada)	Phil Esposito	C	Boston Bruins
14	(Canada)	Norm Ullman	C	Toronto Maple Leafs
15	(Canada)	Bobby Rousseau	RW	Montreal Canadiens
16	(Canada)	Bobby Hull	LW	Chicago Black Hawks
17	(Canada)	Rod Gilbert	RW	New York Rangers
21	(Canada)	Stan Mikita	C	Chicago Black Hawks
27	(Canada)	Frank Mahovlich	LW	Detroit Red Wings

=== West Division All-Stars ===
- Coach: Scotty Bowman (St. Louis Blues)

#	Nat.	Player	Pos.	Team
Goaltenders
1	(Canada)	Glenn Hall		St. Louis Blues
29	(Canada)	Bernie Parent		Philadelphia Flyers
30	(Canada)	Jacques Plante		St. Louis Blues
Defencemen
2	(Canada)	Ed Van Impe		Philadelphia Flyers
3	(Canada)	Al Arbour		St. Louis Blues
4	(Canada)	Elmer Vasko		Minnesota North Stars
5	(Canada)	Doug Harvey		St. Louis Blues
6	(Canada)	Noel Picard		St. Louis Blues
15	(Canada)	Carol Vadnais		Oakland Seals
21	(Canada)	Bill White		Los Angeles Kings
Forwards
7	(Canada)	Red Berenson	C	St. Louis Blues
8	(Canada)	Danny O'Shea	C	Minnesota North Stars
9	(Canada)	Bill Hicke	RW	Oakland Seals
10	(Canada)	Ted Hampson	C	Oakland Seals
11	(Canada)	Ken Schinkel	RW	Pittsburgh Penguins
14	(Canada)	Jim Roberts	RW	St. Louis Blues
16	(Canada)	Claude Larose	RW	Minnesota North Stars
20	(Canada)	Ab McDonald	LW	St. Louis Blues
22	(Canada)	Danny Grant	LW	Minnesota North Stars

C = centre; LW/RW = left wing/right wing

Source: Podnieks

== See also ==
- 1968–69 NHL season
