= Phil Russell (ice hockey) =

Canadian ice hockey player and coach

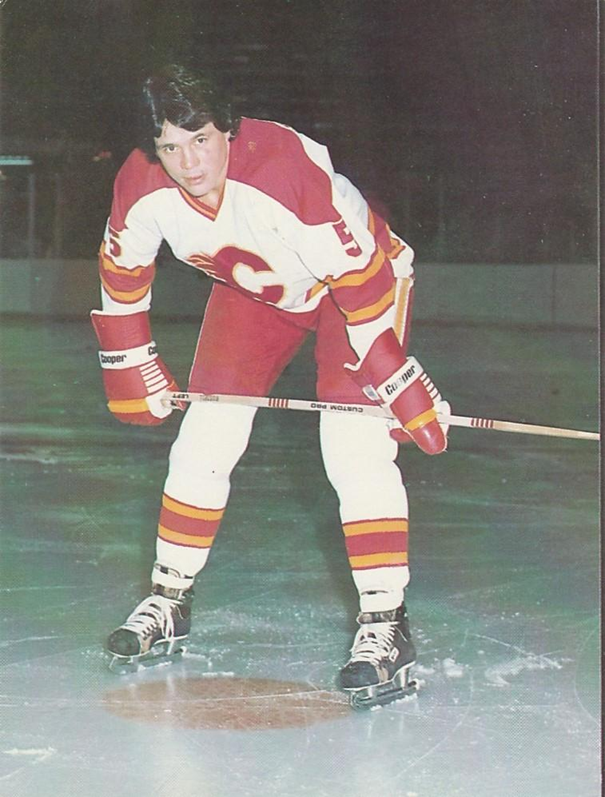
- Born: July 21, 1952 (age 73) Edmonton, Alberta, Canada
- Height: 6 ft 2 in (188 cm)
- Weight: 200 lb (91 kg; 14 st 4 lb)
- Position: Defence
- Shot: Left
- Played for: NHL; Chicago Black Hawks; Atlanta Flames; Calgary Flames; New Jersey Devils; Buffalo Sabres
- NHL draft: 13th overall, 1972; Chicago Black Hawks
- Playing career: 1972–1987

Phillip Douglas Russell (born July 21, 1952) is a Canadian former professional ice hockey defenceman who played over one thousand games in the National Hockey League. Russell featured in the 1973 Stanley Cup Finals with the Chicago Blackhawks.

Russell had a reputation as a bruising, physical player and retired with over 2000 penalty minutes to go along with 424 career points. He played for the Chicago Black Hawks, Atlanta/Calgary Flames, New Jersey Devils and Buffalo Sabres, and retired in 1988. He was most recently an assistant coach with the Springfield Falcons of the American Hockey League. Russell was born in Edmonton, Alberta.

In 2007, Russell was hired as an assistant coach for the now defunct Pensacola Ice Pilots of the ECHL under John Marks.

== Career statistics ==
=== Regular season and playoffs ===
			Regular season					Playoffs
Season	Team	League	GP	G	A	Pts	PIM	GP	G	A	Pts	PIM
1970–71	Edmonton Oil Kings	WCJHL	34	4	16	20	113	17	1	7	8	47
1971–72	Edmonton Oil Kings	WCJHL	64	14	45	59	331	16	1	9	10	15
1971–72	Edmonton Oil Kings	M-Cup	—	—	—	—	—	2	0	0	0	0
1972–73	Chicago Black Hawks	NHL	76	6	19	25	156	16	0	3	3	49
1973–74	Chicago Black Hawks	NHL	75	15	20	35	184	9	0	1	1	41
1974–75	Chicago Black Hawks	NHL	80	5	24	29	260	8	1	3	4	23
1975–76	Chicago Black Hawks	NHL	74	9	29	38	194	4	0	1	1	17
1976–77	Chicago Black Hawks	NHL	76	9	36	45	233	2	0	1	1	2
1977–78	Chicago Black Hawks	NHL	57	6	20	26	139	—	—	—	—	—
1978–79	Chicago Black Hawks	NHL	66	8	23	31	122	—	—	—	—	—
1978–79	Atlanta Flames	NHL	13	1	6	7	28	—	—	—	—	—
1979–80	Atlanta Flames	NHL	80	5	31	36	115	4	0	1	1	6
1980–81	Calgary Flames	NHL	80	6	23	29	104	16	2	7	9	29
1981–82	Calgary Flames	NHL	71	4	25	29	110	3	0	1	1	2
1982–83	Calgary Flames	NHL	78	13	18	31	112	9	1	4	5	24
1983–84	New Jersey Devils	NHL	76	9	22	31	96	—	—	—	—	—
1984–85	New Jersey Devils	NHL	66	4	16	20	110	—	—	—	—	—
1985–86	New Jersey Devils	NHL	30	2	3	5	51	—	—	—	—	—
1985–86	Buffalo Sabres	NHL	12	2	3	5	12	—	—	—	—	—
1986–87	Buffalo Sabres	NHL	6	0	2	2	12	—	—	—	—	—
1986–87	EHC Olten	NDA	5	0	1	1	—	—	—	—	—	—
1987–88	Kalamazoo Wings	IHL	27	2	9	11	35	—	—	—	—	—
NHL totals			1,016	99	325	424	2,038	73	4	22	26	202

=== International ===
Year	Team	Event	GP	G	A	Pts	PIM
1977	Canada	WC	10	0	3	3	16
1986	Canada	WC	8	0	1	1	10
Senior totals			18	0	4	4	26

== Coaching statistics ==
 
Season  Team                  Lge Type            GP  W    L  T OTL    Pct    Result 
1988-89 Muskegon Lumberjacks  IHL Assistant coach 
1989-90 Muskegon Lumberjacks  IHL Assistant coach 
1990-91 Muskegon Lumberjacks  IHL Assistant coach  
1991-92 Muskegon Lumberjacks  IHL Head coach      82  41  28  0  13  0.579  Lost in finals 
1992-93 Cleveland Lumberjacks IHL Head coach      82  39  34  0  9   0.530  Lost in round 1 
1999-00 Cleveland Lumberjacks IHL Head coach             
2004-05 Springfield Falcons   AHL Assistant coach 
2005-06 Springfield Falcons   AHL Assistant coach 
2007-08 Pensacola Ice Pilots  ECHL Assistant coach 

== Awards ==
- WCHL First All-Star Team – 1972
- Played in NHL all-star game (1976,1977 and 1985)

== See also ==
- List of NHL players with 1,000 games played
- List of NHL players with 2,000 career penalty minutes

Preceded by Dan Spring	Chicago Black Hawks first-round draft pick 1972	Succeeded by Darcy Rota
Preceded by Brad Marsh	Calgary Flames captain 1981–83	Succeeded by Lanny McDonald; Doug Risebrough
