= 1972–73 NHL transactions =

The following is a list of all team-to-team transactions that have occurred in the National Hockey League during the 1972–73 NHL season. It lists what team each player has been traded to, signed by, or claimed by, and for which player(s) or draft pick(s), if applicable.

== Trades ==
=== May ===
May 24, 1972	To Detroit Red Wings Gary Doak; Rick Newell	To New York Rangers Joe Zanussi; 1st-round pick - 1972 Amateur Draft (# 10 - Al Blanchard)
May 24, 1972	To St. Louis Blues Steve Durbano	To New York Rangers future considerations (Curt Bennett) (Peter McDuffe)^{2}

1. Trade completed on June 7, 1972.

=== June ===
June 6, 1972	To Buffalo Sabres future considerations^{1}	To New York Islanders 7th-round pick - 1972 Amateur Draft (# 101 - Don McLaughlin); 8th-round pick - 1972 Amateur Draft (# 117 - Rene Levasseur); 9th-round pick - 1972 Amateur Draft (# 133 - Bill Ennos); 10th-round pick - 1972 Amateur Draft (# 146 - Rene Lambert)
June 6, 1972	To New York Rangers future considerations^{2}	To Atlanta Flames 9th-round pick - 1972 Amateur Draft^{3}
June 6, 1972	To Minnesota North Stars cash	To Atlanta Flames Bob Paradise
June 6, 1972	To Minnesota North Stars future considerations (cash)	To New York Islanders Gord Labossiere
June 6, 1972	To Los Angeles Kings future considerations^{2}	To Atlanta Flames 9th-round pick - 1972 Amateur Draft (# 132 - Jean Lamarre); 10th-round pick - 1973 Amateur Draft (# 149 - Guy Ross)
June 6, 1972	To Montreal Canadiens 2nd-round pick 9 1973 Amateur Draft (# 17 - Glenn Goldup) cash	To New York Islanders Alex Campbell; Denis DeJordy; Glenn Resch future considerations^{4} (Germain Gagnon)
June 6, 1972	To New York Rangers future considerations^{1}	To New York Islanders 7th-round pick - 1973 Amateur Draft (#110 - Denis Anderson); 8th-round pick - 1973 Amateur Draft (# 126 - Denis Desgagnes)
June 7, 1972	To Montreal Canadiens 2nd-round pick - 1972 Amateur Draft (# 66 - Bill Nyrop) cash	To Atlanta Flames Ted Tucker; 2nd-round pick - 1972 Amateur Draft (# 78 - Jean-Paul Martin)
June 8, 1972	To Buffalo Sabres Ron Busniuk	To Montreal Canadiens cash
June 8, 1972	To Minnesota North Stars 8th-round pick - 1972 Amateur Draft ( # 116 - Scott MacPhail)	To Los Angeles Kings cash
June 8, 1972	To St. Louis Blues cash	To New York Rangers 9th-round pick - 1972 Amateur Draft (# 137 - Pierre Archambault)
June 8, 1972	To Toronto Maple Leafs 9th-round pick - 1972 Amateur Draft (# 143 - Garry Schofield)	To Boston Bruins cash
June 8, 1972	To Minnesota North Stars 10th-round pick - 1972 Amateur Draft (# 145 - Steve Lyon)	To Los Angeles Kings cash
June 8, 1972	To California Golden Seals cash	To Minnesota North Stars 10th-round pick - 1972 Amateur Draft (# 147 - Juri Kudrasovs)
June 8, 1972	To Minnesota North Stars 10th-round pick - 1972 Amateur Draft (# 148 - Marcel Comeau)	To Philadelphia Flyers cash
June 8, 1972	To Toronto Maple Leafs cash	To Minnesota North Stars 10th-round pick - 1972 Amateur Draft^{5}
June 9, 1972	To Montreal Canadiens cash	To Atlanta Flames Lynn Powis
June 16, 1972	To Atlanta Flames Bill Hogaboam	To New York Rangers Bill Heindl
June 16, 1972	To Montreal Canadiens cash	To Atlanta Flames Rey Comeau

1. The Islanders agrees to not select certain players in the 1972 NHL Expansion Draft.
2. Atlanta agrees to not select certain players in the 1972 NHL Expansion Draft.
3. Atlanta passed on making a selection.
4. Trade completed on June 26, 1972.
5. Minnesota passed on making a selection.

=== August ===
August, 1972 (exact date unknown)	To St. Louis Blues cash	To New York Islanders Dave Pulkkinen
August 3, 1972	To Boston Bruins cash	To Philadelphia Flyers John McKenzie
August 10, 1972	To Montreal Canadiens 3rd-round pick - 1973 Amateur Draft (# 37 - Ed Humphreys) cash	To Atlanta Flames Noel Price
August 22, 1972	To Montreal Canadiens 2nd-round pick - 1974 Amateur Draft (# 30 - Gary MacGregor); 3rd-round pick - 1975 Amateur Draft (# 51 - Paul Woods); 1st-round pick - 1976 Amateur Draft (# 13 - Rod Schutt)	To Los Angeles Kings Terry Harper

=== September ===
September 1, 1972	To St. Louis Blues cash	To New York Islanders Brian Lavender
September 15, 1972	To St. Louis Blues Christian Bordeleau	To Chicago Black Hawks rights to John Garrett

=== October ===
October 4, 1972	To Detroit Red Wings Denis DeJordy; Don McLaughlin	To New York Islanders Arnie Brown; Gerry Gray
October 6, 1972	To Detroit Red Wings Roy Edwards	To Pittsburgh Penguins cash
October 30, 1972	To Atlanta Flames Brian McKenzie	To Pittsburgh Penguins cash

=== November ===
November 14, 1972	To New York Rangers cash	To New York Islanders Ron Stewart
November 28, 1972	To Atlanta Flames Leon Rochefort	To Detroit Red Wings Bill Hogaboam
November 4, 1970	To Atlanta Flames Curt Bennett	To New York Rangers Ron Harris

=== December ===
December 5, 1972	To California Golden Seals Darryl Maggs	To Chicago Black Hawks Dick Redmond rights to Bobby Sheehan
December 14, 1972	To St. Louis Blues Brent Hughes; Pierre Plante	To Philadelphia Flyers Andre Dupont; 3rd-round pick - 1973 Amateur Draft (# 40 - Bob Stumpf)

=== January ===
January 17, 1973	To Detroit Red Wings Brian Lavender; Ken Murray	To New York Islanders Bob Cook; Ralph Stewart
January 22, 1973	To Los Angeles Kings Frank St. Marseille	To St. Louis Blues Paul Curtis

=== February ===
February 13, 1973	To Atlanta Flames Arnie Brown	To New York Islanders Ernie Hicke future considerations^{1} (Bill MacMillan)
February 14, 1973	To Buffalo Sabres Norm Gratton	To Atlanta Flames Butch Deadmarsh
February 25, 1973	To Detroit Red Wings 3rd-round pick - 1973 Amateur Draft (# 39 - Nelson Pyatt) cash	To Pittsburgh Penguins Andy Brown
February 26, 1973	To Los Angeles Kings Dan Maloney	To Chicago Black Hawks Ralph Backstrom

1. Trade completed on May 29, 1973.

=== March ===
March 1, 1973	To Boston Bruins Gary Doak	To Detroit Red Wings Garnet Bailey future considerations^{1} (Murray Wing)
March 1, 1973	To Minnesota North Stars Don Blackburn	To New York Islanders cash
March 2, 1973	To St. Louis Blues Ab DeMarco Jr.	To New York Rangers Mike Murphy
March 2, 1973	To Pittsburgh Penguins future considerations^{2} (Steve Andrascik)	To New York Rangers Sheldon Kannegiesser
March 3, 1973	To Toronto Maple Leafs 1st-round pick - 1973 Amateur Draft (# 15 - Ian Turnbull) future considerations^{3} (Eddie Johnston)	To Boston Bruins Jacques Plante; 3rd-round pick - 1973 Amateur Draft (# 36 - Doug Gibson)
March 4, 1973	To California Golden Seals cash future considerations^{4} (Gary Coalter) (Dave Hrechkosy)	To New York Rangers Bert Marshall
March 5, 1973	To Philadelphia Flyers Terry Crisp	To New York Islanders Jean Potvin future considerations^{5} (Glen Irwin)

1. Trade completed on June 4, 1973.
2. Trade completed on May 16, 1973.
3. Trade completed on May 22, 1973.
4. Trade completed on May 17, 1973.
5. Trade completed on May 18, 1973.

== Expansion Draft ==
The 1972–73 NHL season saw the entrance of a 15th and 16th team to the league, the New York Islanders and Atlanta Flames. Each team selected 21 players from across the league, for a total of 42 selections.

== Additional sources ==
- hockeydb.com - search for player and select "show trades"
- "NHL trades for 1970-1971". NHL Trade Tracker.
