= Brian Lavender =

Canadian ice hockey player

- Born: April 20, 1947 (age 78) Edmonton, Alberta, Canada
- Height: 6 ft 0 in (183 cm)
- Weight: 180 lb (82 kg; 12 st 12 lb)
- Position: Left wing
- Shot: Left
- Played for: St. Louis Blues; New York Islanders; Detroit Red Wings; California Golden Seals; Denver Spurs; Ottawa Civics
- Playing career: 1967–1976

Brian James Lavender (born April 20, 1947) is a Canadian former professional ice hockey player.

== Career ==
Lavender was a forward who played 184 games in the National Hockey League for the California Golden Seals, Detroit Red Wings, St. Louis Blues, and New York Islanders between 1971 and 1974. He also played 37 games in the World Hockey Association for the Denver Spurs and Ottawa Civics during the 1975–76 season.

== Career statistics ==
=== Regular season and playoffs ===
			Regular season					Playoffs
Season	Team	League	GP	G	A	Pts	PIM	GP	G	A	Pts	PIM
1965–66	Regina Pats	SJHL	60	32	35	67	90	5	1	2	3	2
1966–67	Regina Pats	CMJHL	56	39	71	110	100	16	6	14	20	28
1967–68	Houston Apollos	CHL	49	7	11	18	05	—	—	—	—	—
1968–69	Houston Apollos	CHL	71	14	29	43	113	3	0	0	0	6
1969–70	Cleveland Barons	AHL	67	8	13	21	89	—	—	—	—	—
1970–71	Montreal Voyageurs	AHL	59	7	9	16	38	3	0	0	0	0
1971–72	St. Louis Blues	NHL	46	5	11	16	54	3	0	0	0	2
1971–72	Denver Spurs	WHL	27	14	16	30	73	—	—	—	—	—
1972–73	New York Islanders	NHL	43	6	6	12	47	—	—	—	—	—
1972–73	Detroit Red Wings	NHL	26	2	2	4	14	—	—	—	—	—
1973–74	Detroit Red Wings	NHL	4	0	0	0	11	—	—	—	—	—
1973–74	Virginia Wings	AHL	53	11	19	30	72	—	—	—	—	—
1973–74	Providence Reds	AHL	10	1	6	7	2	14	6	1	7	24
1974–75	California Golden Seals	NHL	65	3	7	10	48	—	—	—	—	—
1975–76	Denver Spurs/Ottawa Civics	WHA	37	5	6	11	35	—	—	—	—	—
WHA totals			37	5	6	11	35	—	—	—	—	—
NHL totals			184	16	26	42	174	3	0	0	0	2
