= Danny Grant (ice hockey) =

Canadian ice hockey player (1946–2019)

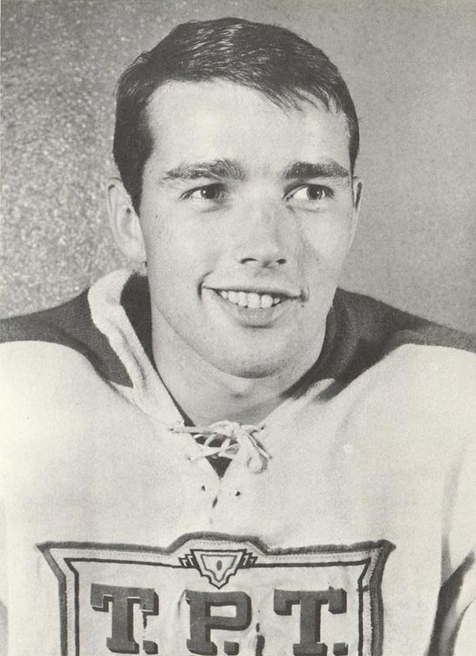
- 1965 photo of Grant
- Born: February 21, 1946 Fredericton, New Brunswick, Canada
- Died: October 14, 2019 (aged 73) Fredericton, New Brunswick, Canada
- Height: 5 ft 10 in (178 cm)
- Weight: 185 lb (84 kg; 13 st 3 lb)
- Position: Left wing
- Shot: Left
- Played for: Montreal Canadiens; Minnesota North Stars; Detroit Red Wings; Los Angeles Kings
- Playing career: 1964–1982

Daniel Frederick Grant (February 21, 1946 – October 14, 2019) was a Canadian professional ice hockey left winger, who played in the National Hockey League (NHL) for parts of fourteen seasons from 1966 to 1979, most notably for the Minnesota North Stars. In his career, Grant notched 263 goals and 535 points while playing for the Montreal Canadiens, Minnesota North Stars, Detroit Red Wings and the Los Angeles Kings, and played in three All-Star Games (1969, 1970, 1971).

== Playing career ==
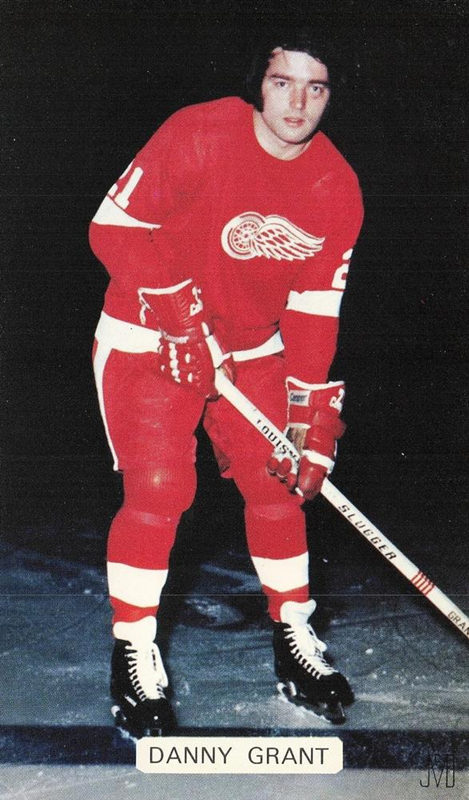
1970s photo of Grant for Detroit Red Wings

Grant was born in Fredericton, New Brunswick. After a fine junior career with the Peterborough Petes and a season and a half in the minor leagues with the Houston Apollos, Grant made the NHL with the Montreal Canadiens in 1967–68, playing 22 regular season games and 10 playoff games. Grant helped Montreal win the Stanley Cup in 1968.

He was then acquired by the Minnesota North Stars, and in his 1968–69 rookie season with the club won the NHL's Calder Memorial Trophy as the league's most outstanding rookie player, thus becoming one of only four players who won the Stanley Cup the season before winning the Calder Trophy. He would remain a star for Minnesota for six seasons, scoring 32 or more goals in three of them.

Despite this, Grant was traded during the 1974–75 season in a surprising deal for defensive forward Henry Boucha (whose attraction to the franchise may have been that he was a Minnesota native), and the trade backfired badly; Grant had his best season that season, scoring 50 goals for the Detroit Red Wings while on a line with superstar centre Marcel Dionne, and becoming only the 12th player in NHL history to accomplish that feat. However, Grant was plagued by injuries from that point on, and only played partial seasons at best thereafter. He retired after the 1978–79 season to coach a Tier II junior team.

In 1985, he was inducted into the New Brunswick Sports Hall of Fame.

== Post-playing career ==
Grant went on to coach the University of New Brunswick hockey team in 1995 and 1996, and the Halifax Mooseheads Quebec league junior team in 1998. Grant was an assistant coach for the St. Thomas Tommies men's hockey team since the 2002–03 season.

Grant sat on the TELUS Atlantic Canada Community Board, which allocates funding to organizations which involve youth and/or technology throughout Atlantic Canada.

Grant died of cancer on October 14, 2019, at the age of 73 and is buried at Fredericton Rural Cemetery.

== Awards and achievements ==
- Selected to the OHA-Jr. Second All-Star Team in 1964–65.
- Selected to the OHA-Jr. First All-Star Team in 1965–66.
- Stanley Cup champion in 1968.
- Calder Memorial Trophy winner in 1968–69.
- Played in 1969, 1970 and 1971 NHL All-Star Games.
- Inducted into the New Brunswick Sports Hall of Fame in 1985.

== Career statistics ==
=== Regular season and playoffs ===
			Regular season					Playoffs
Season	Team	League	GP	G	A	Pts	PIM	GP	G	A	Pts	PIM
1962–63	Peterborough Petes	OHA	50	12	9	21	8	6	0	1	1	0
1963–64	Peterborough Petes	OHA	44	18	21	39	20	5	2	2	4	4
1964–65	Peterborough Petes	OHA	56	47	59	106	23	12	7	7	14	4
1964–65	Quebec Aces	AHL	1	0	1	1	2	—	—	—	—	—
1965–66	Peterborough Petes	OHA	48	44	52	96	34	4	2	5	7	10
1965–66	Montreal Canadiens	NHL	1	0	0	0	0	—	—	—	—	—
1966–67	Houston Apollos	CPHL	64	22	28	50	29	6	4	4	8	2
1967–68	Houston Apollos	CPHL	19	14	8	22	6	—	—	—	—	—
1967–68	Montreal Canadiens	NHL	22	3	4	7	10	10	0	3	3	5
1968–69	Minnesota North Stars	NHL	75	31	34	65	46	—	—	—	—	—
1969–70	Minnesota North Stars	NHL	76	29	28	57	23	6	0	2	2	4
1970–71	Minnesota North Stars	NHL	78	34	23	57	46	12	5	5	10	8
1971–72	Minnesota North Stars	NHL	78	18	25	43	18	7	2	1	3	0
1972–73	Minnesota North Stars	NHL	78	32	35	67	12	6	3	1	4	0
1973–74	Minnesota North Stars	NHL	78	29	35	64	16	—	—	—	—	—
1974–75	Detroit Red Wings	NHL	80	50	36	86	28	—	—	—	—	—
1975–76	Detroit Red Wings	NHL	39	10	13	23	20	—	—	—	—	—
1976–77	Detroit Red Wings	NHL	42	2	10	12	4	—	—	—	—	—
1977–78	Detroit Red Wings	NHL	13	2	2	4	6	—	—	—	—	—
1977–78	Los Angeles Kings	NHL	41	10	19	29	2	2	0	2	2	0
1978–79	Los Angeles Kings	NHL	35	10	11	21	8	—	—	—	—	—
1981–82	Fredericton Express	AHL	19	2	7	9	4	—	—	—	—	—
NHL totals			736	263	272	535	239	43	10	14	24	19

=== Notes ===
1. Note: Harper served as Red Wings captain for most of the 1975–76 season, while Grant was injured and out of the lineup.
2. Note: Polonich served as Red Wings captain for part of the 1976–77 season, while Grant was injured and out of the lineup.

Preceded by Marcel Dionne	Detroit Red Wings captain 1975–77 with Terry Harper, 1975–76 and Dennis Polonich, 1976–77	Succeeded by Dan Maloney
Preceded by Derek Sanderson	Winner of the Calder Memorial Trophy; 1969	Succeeded by Tony Esposito
