= 1972–73 NHL season =

National Hockey League season

- League: National Hockey League
- Sport: Ice hockey
- Duration: October 7, 1972 – May 10, 1973
- Games: 78
- Teams: 16
- TV partner(s): CBC, CTV, SRC (Canada); NBC (United States)

Draft
- Top draft pick: Billy Harris
- Picked by: New York Islanders

Regular season
- Season champions: Montreal Canadiens
- Season MVP: Bobby Clarke (Flyers)
- Top scorer: Phil Esposito (Bruins)

Playoffs
- Playoffs MVP: Yvan Cournoyer (Canadiens)

Stanley Cup
- Champions: Montreal Canadiens
- Runners-up: Chicago Black Hawks

NHL seasons
- 1971–72 1973–74

The 1972–73 NHL season was the 56th season of the National Hockey League. Sixteen teams each played 78 games. Two new teams, the New York Islanders and the Atlanta Flames (who relocated to Calgary in 1980 and are now known as the Calgary Flames), made their debuts. The Montreal Canadiens won the Stanley Cup by beating the Chicago Black Hawks four games to two in the Stanley Cup Final.

== Pre-season ==
Prior to the start of the season, the 1972 Summit Series took place. It was the first ever meeting between Soviet Union and NHL calibre Canadian ice hockey players. Canada expected to easily beat the Soviets, but were shocked to find themselves with a losing record of one win, two losses, and a tie after four games in Canada. In game four, which Canada lost 5–3, Vancouver fans echoed the rest of Canada's thoughts of Team Canada's poor performance by booing them off the ice. The final four games were played in the Soviet Union. Canada lost game five, but won the last three for a final record of four wins, three losses, and a tie.

For the first time since the collapse of the Western Hockey League in 1926, the National Hockey League had serious competition. A new professional hockey league, the World Hockey Association, made its season debut with 12 new teams, half of which were based in cities with existing NHL teams. Unlike the Western Hockey League, though, the new World Hockey Association would not challenge for the Stanley Cup. In response to the new league, the NHL hastily added two new teams in an unplanned expansion, the New York Islanders and Atlanta Flames, in an attempt to exclude the WHA from newly constructed arenas in those markets. The 1972 NHL expansion draft was held on June 6 to fill the rosters of the two new teams.

In February 1972, the Miami Screaming Eagles of the WHA signed Bernie Parent to a contract, and when Bobby Hull was signed on June 27, 1972, to play with the Winnipeg Jets, the Chicago Black Hawks sued, claiming a violation of the reserve clause in NHL contracts. Others soon followed Hull to the WHA, including, J. C. Tremblay, Ted Green, Gerry Cheevers and Johnny McKenzie. In the expansion draft, the New York Islanders and Atlanta Flames made their picks and eleven Islander players skipped off to the WHA. The California Golden Seals, chafing under the unorthodox ownership of the unpopular Charlie Finley, were also a victim of the WHA, losing eight key players.

The 1972 NHL amateur draft was held on June 8 at the Queen Elizabeth Hotel in Montreal, Quebec. Billy Harris was selected first overall by the Islanders.

== Arena changes ==
- The expansion Atlanta Flames moved into the Omni Coliseum.
- The expansion New York Islanders moved into Nassau Veterans Memorial Coliseum in Uniondale, New York.

== Regular season ==
The Montreal Canadiens took over first place in the East Division and the league from the Boston Bruins while for the third consecutive season the Chicago Black Hawks dominated the West Division.

=== Final standings ===
East Division
		GP	W	L	T	GF	GA	DIFF	Pts
1	Montreal Canadiens	78	52	10	16	329	184	+145	120
2	Boston Bruins	78	51	22	5	330	235	+95	107
3	New York Rangers	78	47	23	8	297	208	+89	102
4	Buffalo Sabres	78	37	27	14	257	219	+38	88
5	Detroit Red Wings	78	37	29	12	265	243	+22	86
6	Toronto Maple Leafs	78	27	41	10	247	279	−32	64
7	Vancouver Canucks	78	22	47	9	233	339	−106	53
8	New York Islanders	78	12	60	6	170	347	−177	30

West Division
		GP	W	L	T	GF	GA	DIFF	Pts
1	Chicago Black Hawks	78	42	27	9	284	225	+59	93
2	Philadelphia Flyers	78	37	30	11	296	256	+40	85
3	Minnesota North Stars	78	37	30	11	254	230	+24	85
4	St. Louis Blues	78	32	34	12	233	251	−18	76
5	Pittsburgh Penguins	78	32	37	9	257	265	−8	73
6	Los Angeles Kings	78	31	36	11	232	245	−13	73
7	Atlanta Flames	78	25	38	15	191	239	−48	65
8	California Golden Seals	78	16	46	16	213	323	−110	48

== Playoffs ==
No teams in the playoffs swept their opponents, the last time this would happen until 1991, and no playoff series went to a decisive game, the last time this has happened to date. In addition, the Chicago Black Hawks reached the Stanley Cup Final without a captain, the last time this would happen until 2014.

=== Playoff bracket ===
The top four teams in each division qualified for the playoffs. In each round, teams competed in a best-of-seven series (scores in the bracket indicate the number of games won in each best-of-seven series).

In the quarterfinals, the fourth seeded team in each division played against the division winner from their division. The other series matched the second and third place teams from the divisions. The semifinals were then inter-divisional matchups, with winner of each #1 vs. #4 series playing the winner of the #2 vs. #3 series in the other division. The winners of the semifinals then advanced to the Stanley Cup Final.

Quarterfinals
E1	Montreal	4
E4	Buffalo	2
W2	Philadelphia	4
W3	Minnesota	2
W1	Chicago	4
W4	St. Louis	1
E2	Boston	1
E3	NY Rangers	4

Semifinals
E1	Montreal	4
W2	Philadelphia	1
W1	Chicago	4
E3	NY Rangers	1

Stanley Cup Final
E1	Montreal	4
W1	Chicago	2

=== Quarterfinals ===
==== (E1) Montreal Canadiens vs. (E4) Buffalo Sabres ====
The Montreal Canadiens finished first in the league with 120 points. The Buffalo Sabres finished fourth with 88 points. This was the first playoff meeting between these two teams. This was the Buffalo Sabres' first playoff appearance in their third season since entering the league in the 1970–71 NHL season. Montreal won the five-game regular season series earning six of ten points.

April 4	Buffalo Sabres	1–2	Montreal Canadiens	Montreal Forum	Recap
No scoring		First period	No scoring
Craig Ramsay (1) – 03:13		Second period	17:01 – Jacques Lemaire (1)
No scoring		Third period	04:27 – pp – Yvan Cournoyer (1)
Dave Dryden 34 saves / 36 shots		Goalie stats	Ken Dryden 31 saves / 32 shots

April 5	Buffalo Sabres	3–7	Montreal Canadiens	Montreal Forum	Recap
Gilbert Perreault (1) – 01:06; Richard Martin (1) – pp – 16:48		First period	No scoring
No scoring		Second period	04:48 – Serge Savard (1); 06:07 – Yvan Cournoyer (2); 10:39 – Marc Tardif (1); 16:21 – pp – Guy Lapointe (1); 17:29 – Jacques Lemaire (2)
Jim Schoenfeld (1) – 17:45		Third period	03:10 – Yvan Cournoyer (3); 15:31 – Yvan Cournoyer (4)
Dave Dryden 28 saves / 35 shots		Goalie stats	Ken Dryden 20 saves / 23 shots

April 7	Montreal Canadiens	5–2	Buffalo Sabres	Buffalo Memorial Auditorium	Recap
Guy Lafleur (1) – pp – 16:56		First period	No scoring
Peter Mahovlich (1) – pp – 08:44; Murray Wilson (1) – 09:00		Second period	01:13 – Larry Mickey (1)
Frank Mahovlich (1) – 12:15; Henri Richard (1) – en – 19:12		Third period	00:54 – pp – Rene Robert (1)
Ken Dryden 42 saves / 44 shots		Goalie stats	Roger Crozier 22 saves / 26 shots

April 8	Montreal Canadiens	1–5	Buffalo Sabres	Buffalo Memorial Auditorium	Recap
Yvan Cournoyer (5) – 18:37		First period	No scoring
No scoring		Second period	11:13 – Jim Schoenfeld (2); 14:29 – pp – Gilbert Perreault (2)
No scoring		Third period	01:28 – Rene Robert (2); 19:19 – Don Luce (1); 19:41 – Gilbert Perreault (3)
Ken Dryden 45 saves / 50 shots		Goalie stats	Roger Crozier 23 saves / 24 shots

April 10	Buffalo Sabres	3–2	OT	Montreal Canadiens	Montreal Forum	Recap
No scoring		First period		16:22 – Frank Mahovlich (2)
Richard Martin (2) – 12:03; Rene Robert (3) – 13:11		Second period		No scoring
No scoring		Third period		12:46 – Guy Lapointe (2)
Rene Robert (4) – 09:18		First overtime period		No scoring
Roger Crozier 38 saves / 40 shots		Goalie stats		Ken Dryden 31 saves / 34 shots

April 12	Montreal Canadiens	4–2	Buffalo Sabres	Buffalo Memorial Auditorium	Recap
Serge Savard (2) – 01:32; Murray Wilson (2) – 07:33; Guy Lafleur (2) – 08:53; Guy Lapointe (3) – 16:03		First period	No scoring
No scoring		Second period	No scoring
No scoring		Third period	11:41 – Rene Robert (5); 19:48 – pp – Richard Martin (3)
Ken Dryden 42 saves / 44 shots		Goalie stats	Roger Crozier 20 saves / 24 shots

Montreal won series 4–2

==== (E2) Boston Bruins vs. (E3) New York Rangers ====
The Boston Bruins finished second in the East Division with 107 points. The New York Rangers finished third in the East Division with 102 points. This was the ninth playoff meeting between these two teams with Boston winning six of the eight previous series. They last met in the previous year's Stanley Cup Final which Boston won in six games. The teams split this year's six-game regular season series.

April 4	New York Rangers	6–2	Boston Bruins	Boston Garden	Recap
Brad Park (1) – pp – 15:59		First period	14:21 – Doug Roberts (1)
Bruce MacGregor (1) – 07:25; Brad Park (2) – 08:53; Walt Tkaczuk (1) – 11:48; Walt Tkaczuk (2) – 15:55		Second period	No scoring
03:11 – Pete Stemkowski (1)		Third period	Derek Sanderson (1) – 11:17
Eddie Giacomin 22 saves / 24 shots		Goalie stats	Jacques Plante 25 saves / 31 shots

April 5	New York Rangers	4–2	Boston Bruins	Boston Garden	Recap
Steve Vickers (1) – 13:20		First period	07:55 – Wayne Cashman (1)
Ted Irvine (1) – pp – 09:47; Pete Stemkowski (2) – pp – 13:29		Second period	16:34 – Doug Roberts (2)
Walt Tkaczuk (3) – pp – 05:37		Third period	No scoring
Eddie Giacomin 18 saves / 20 shots Gilles Villemure 10 saves / 10 shots		Goalie stats	Jacques Plante 28 saves / 32 shots

April 7	Boston Bruins	4–2	New York Rangers	Madison Square Garden	Recap
Gregg Sheppard (1) – sh – 06:53		First period	18:35 – Pete Stemkowski (3)
Fred Stanfield (1) – 03:13		Second period	No scoring
Gregg Sheppard (2) – 10:39; Mike Walton (1) – en – 19:08		Third period	06:12 – Jean Ratelle (1)
Eddie Johnston 35 saves / 37 shots		Goalie stats	Eddie Giacomin 23 saves / 26 shots

April 8	Boston Bruins	0–4	New York Rangers	Madison Square Garden	Recap
No scoring		First period	02:35 – Rod Gilbert (1); 16:30 – Pete Stemkowski (4)
No scoring		Second period	11:22 – Bobby Rousseau (1); 19:15 – Steve Vickers (2)
No scoring		Third period	No scoring
Eddie Johnston 21 saves / 25 shots		Goalie stats	Eddie Giacomin 33 saves / 33 shots

April 10	New York Rangers	6–3	Boston Bruins	Boston Garden	Recap
Steve Vickers (3) – 00:38; Steve Vickers (4) – 14:34; Bruce MacGregor (2) – 16:33		First period	01:54 – Bobby Orr (1); 12:45 – pp – Ken Hodge (1)
Walt Tkaczuk (4) – 18:59		Second period	No scoring
Rod Gilbert (2) – 04:10; Steve Vickers (5) – 17:51		Third period	07:10 – Don Marcotte (1)
Eddie Giacomin 28 saves / 31 shots		Goalie stats	Eddie Johnston 22 saves / 25 shots Ross Brooks 8 saves / 11 shots

New York won series 4–1

==== (W1) Chicago Black Hawks vs. (W4) St. Louis Blues ====
The Chicago Black Hawks finished first in the West Division with 93 points. The St. Louis Blues finished fourth in the West Division with 76 points. This was the first playoff meeting between these two teams. The teams split this year's six-game regular season series.

April 4	St. Louis Blues	1–7	Chicago Blackhawks	Chicago Stadium	Recap
No scoring		First period	15:02 – Dick Redmond (1); 15:20 – Dick Redmond (2)
No scoring		Second period	02:13 – Dick Redmond (3); 09:38 – Jim Pappin (1); 10:32 – Pit Martin (1)
Phil Roberto (1) – 19:07		Third period	12:33 – pp – Pit Martin (2); 16:24 – pp – Pit Martin (3)
Wayne Stephenson 32 saves / 39 shots		Goalie stats	Tony Esposito 28 saves / 29 shots

April 5	St. Louis Blues	0–1	Chicago Blackhawks	Chicago Stadium	Recap
No scoring		First period	14:06 – Lou Angotti (1)
No scoring		Second period	No scoring
No scoring		Third period	No scoring
Jacques Caron 25 saves / 26 shots		Goalie stats	Tony Esposito 29 saves / 29 shots

April 7	Chicago Blackhawks	5–2	St. Louis Blues	St. Louis Arena	Recap
Dennis Hull (1) – pp – 02:29; Ralph Backstrom (1) – 11:26; Jim Pappin (2) – 13:51		First period	05:52 – pp – Ab DeMarco Jr. (1); 10:26 – Pierre Plante (1)
Ralph Backstrom (2) – 03:10		Second period	No scoring
Jim Pappin (3) – pp – 07:31		Third period	No scoring
Tony Esposito 28 saves / 30 shots		Goalie stats	Jacques Caron 35 saves / 40 shots

April 8	Chicago Blackhawks	3–5	St. Louis Blues	St. Louis Arena	Recap
Ralph Backstrom (3) – 06:33; Cliff Koroll (1) – 11:11		First period	16:48 – Pierre Plante (2)
No scoring		Second period	14:03 – Phil Roberto (2); 15:31 – Fran Huck (1); 18:29 – Gary Sabourin (1)
Chico Maki (1) – 14:21		Third period	16:56 – Garry Unger (1)
Gary Smith 34 saves / 39 shots		Goalie stats	Wayne Stephenson 37 saves / 40 shots

April 10	St. Louis Blues	1–6	Chicago Blackhawks	Chicago Stadium	Recap
No scoring		First period	01:14 – Jim Pappin (4); 14:52 – Stan Mikita (1)
Fran Huck (2) – pp – 04:20		Second period	00:30 – Cliff Koroll (2); 11:37 – Chico Maki (2)
No scoring		Third period	15:32 – sh – Ralph Backstrom (4); 17:41 – Lou Angotti (2)
Wayne Stephenson 17 saves / 21 shots Jacques Caron 9 saves / 11 shots		Goalie stats	Tony Esposito 12 saves / 13 shots

Chicago won series 4–1

==== (W2) Philadelphia Flyers vs. (W3) Minnesota North Stars ====
The Philadelphia Flyers and Minnesota North Stars finished tied for second in the West Division each with 85 points (Philadelphia won the tiebreaker in season series 3–2). This was the first playoff meeting between these two teams. Philadelphia won three of the five games in this year's regular season series.

April 4	Minnesota North Stars	3–0	Philadelphia Flyers	The Spectrum	Recap
No scoring		First period	No scoring
Dennis Hextall (1) – 09:21; Dennis O'Brien (1) – 19:45		Second period	No scoring
Jude Drouin (1) – 09:17		Third period	No scoring
Cesare Maniago 33 saves / 33 shots		Goalie stats	Doug Favell 25 saves / 28 shots

April 5	Minnesota North Stars	1–4	Philadelphia Flyers	The Spectrum	Recap
No scoring		First period	05:48 – Don Saleski (1)
No scoring		Second period	01:08 – sh – Bill Flett (1); 08:37 – Bill Barber (1); 18:46 – Terry Crisp (1)
Dean Prentice (1) – pp – 04:14		Third period	No scoring
Gilles Gilbert 36 saves / 40 shots		Goalie stats	Doug Favell 31 saves / 32 shots

April 7	Philadelphia Flyers	0–5	Minnesota North Stars	Met Center	Recap
No scoring		First period	09:35 – Dennis Hextall (2)
No scoring		Second period	No scoring
No scoring		Third period	00:54 – pp – Barry Gibbs (1); 09:36 – Lou Nanne (1); 09:54 – Danny Grant (1); 15:27 – Danny Grant (2)
Doug Favell 27 saves / 31 shots Michel Belhumeur 8 saves / 9 shots		Goalie stats	Cesare Maniago 33 saves / 33 shots

April 8	Philadelphia Flyers	3–0	Minnesota North Stars	Met Center	Recap
Bobby Clarke (1) – pp – 18:57		First period	No scoring
No scoring		Second period	No scoring
Bill Barber (2) – 14:16; Ross Lonsberry (1) – 16:00		Third period	No scoring
Doug Favell 31 saves / 31 shots		Goalie stats	Cesare Maniago 29 saves / 32 shots

April 10	Minnesota North Stars	2–3	OT	Philadelphia Flyers	The Spectrum	Recap
Danny Grant (3) – 10:48		First period		11:24 – pp – Rick MacLeish (1)
No scoring		Second period		02:17 – pp – Rick MacLeish (2)
Bill Goldsworthy (1) – 13:00		Third period		No scoring
No scoring		First overtime period		08:35 – Gary Dornhoefer (1)
Cesare Maniago 24 saves / 27 shots		Goalie stats		Doug Favell 30 saves / 32 shots

April 12	Philadelphia Flyers	4–1	Minnesota North Stars	Met Center	Recap
No scoring		First period	13:40 – pp – Bill Goldsworthy (2)
Terry Crisp (2) – pp – 04:10; Ross Lonsberry (2) – 16:42; Dave Schultz (1) – 18:01		Second period	No scoring
Ross Lonsberry (3) – en – 19:48		Third period	No scoring
Doug Favell 37 saves / 38 shots		Goalie stats	Cesare Maniago 19 saves / 22 shots

Philadelphia won series 4–2

=== Semifinals ===
==== (E1) Montreal Canadiens vs. (W2) Philadelphia Flyers ====
This was the first playoff meeting between these two teams. The teams split this year's five-game regular season series.

April 14	Philadelphia Flyers	5–4	OT	Montreal Canadiens	Montreal Forum	Recap
Bill Barber (3) – 14:20		First period		04:48 – Yvan Cournoyer (6)
Simon Nolet (1) – 03:16		Second period		17:28 – pp – Guy Lapointe (4)
Simon Nolet (2) – 10:18; Gary Dornhoefer (2) – 12:04		Third period		08:58 – Guy Lapointe (5); 15:25 – Jacques Lemaire (3)
Rick MacLeish (3) – 02:56		First overtime period		No scoring
Doug Favell 41 saves / 45 shots		Goalie stats		Ken Dryden 32 saves / 37 shots

April 17	Philadelphia Flyers	3–4	OT	Montreal Canadiens	Montreal Forum	Recap
Andre Dupont (1) – 05:50; Gary Dornhoefer (3) – pp – 08:12		First period		19:13 – pp – Guy Lafleur (3)
Bill Flett (2) – 00:36		Second period		00:25 – Henri Richard (2)
No scoring		Third period		11:50 – Yvan Cournoyer (7)
No scoring		First overtime period		06:45 – Larry Robinson (1)
Doug Favell 32 saves / 36 shots		Goalie stats		Ken Dryden 36 saves / 39 shots

April 19	Montreal Canadiens	2–1	Philadelphia Flyers	The Spectrum	Recap
Rejean Houle (1) – 06:34; Henri Richard (3) – 18:19		First period	No scoring
No scoring		Second period	10:09 – Terry Crisp (3)
No scoring		Third period	No scoring
Ken Dryden 25 saves / 26 shots		Goalie stats	Doug Favell 24 saves / 26 shots

April 22	Montreal Canadiens	4–1	Philadelphia Flyers	The Spectrum	Recap
No scoring		First period	04:08 – pp – Bobby Clarke (2)
Rejean Houle (2) – 07:38; Marc Tardif (2) – pp – 14:07; Yvan Cournoyer (8) – pp – 16:01		Second period	No scoring
Frank Mahovlich (3) – en – 19:27		Third period	No scoring
Ken Dryden 31 saves / 32 shots		Goalie stats	Doug Favell 23 saves / 26 shots

April 24	Philadelphia Flyers	3–5	Montreal Canadiens	Montreal Forum	Recap
Ross Lonsberry (4) – 08:57		First period	15:29 – Marc Tardif (3)
Simon Nolet (3) – 06:18		Second period	00:23 – pp – Jacques Lemaire (4)
Bill Flett (3) – 05:30		Third period	05:44 – Frank Mahovlich (4); 12:07 – Henri Richard (4); 13:42 – Yvan Cournoyer (9)
Doug Favell 29 saves / 34 shots		Goalie stats	Ken Dryden 17 saves / 20 shots

Montreal won series 4–1

==== (W1) Chicago Black Hawks vs. (E3) New York Rangers ====
This was the fifth playoff meeting between these two teams with Chicago winning three of the four previous series. They last met in the previous year's Stanley Cup semifinals which New York won in a four-game sweep. The teams split this year's five-game regular season series.

April 12	New York Rangers	4–1	Chicago Blackhawks	Chicago Stadium	Recap
Bobby Rousseau (2) – 14:09		First period	12:37 – Pit Martin (4)
No scoring		Second period	No scoring
Vic Hadfield (1) – 04:04; Walt Tkaczuk (5) – 17:45; Walt Tkaczuk (6) – en – 19:35		Third period	No scoring
Eddie Giacomin 21 saves / 22 shots		Goalie stats	Tony Esposito 21 saves / 24 shots

April 15	New York Rangers	4–5	Chicago Blackhawks	Chicago Stadium	Recap
Rod Gilbert (3) – 18:54		First period	05:32 – Pat Stapleton (1); 07:55 – pp – Pat Stapleton (2); 11:20 – Dennis Hull (2)
Jean Ratelle (2) – pp – 05:31; Bill Fairbairn (1) – 08:22; Rod Gilbert (4) – 17:26		Second period	12:02 – pp – Dennis Hull (3); 14:40 – Dick Redmond (4)
No scoring		Third period	No scoring
Eddie Giacomin 5 saves / 8 shots Gilles Villemure 19 saves / 21 shots		Goalie stats	Tony Esposito 28 saves / 32 shots

April 17	Chicago Blackhawks	2–1	New York Rangers	Madison Square Garden	Recap
Jim Pappin (5) – 08:20		First period	No scoring
No scoring		Second period	14:51 – Walt Tkaczuk (7)
Stan Mikita (2) – 06:16		Third period	No scoring
Tony Esposito 37 saves / 38 shots		Goalie stats	Eddie Giacomin 26 saves / 28 shots

April 19	Chicago Blackhawks	3–1	New York Rangers	Madison Square Garden	Recap
No scoring		First period	No scoring
Dennis Hull (4) – pp – 11:20		Second period	No scoring
Pit Martin (5) – 14:11; Dennis Hull (5) – 16:56		Third period	02:16 – Vic Hadfield (2)
Tony Esposito 38 saves / 39 shots		Goalie stats	Eddie Giacomin 18 saves / 21 shots

April 24	New York Rangers	1–4	Chicago Blackhawks	Chicago Stadium	Recap
No scoring		First period	19:20 – pp – Stan Mikita (3)
Rod Gilbert (5) – 19:19		Second period	14:07 – Dennis Hull (6)
No scoring		Third period	04:47 – Stan Mikita; 08:15 – Cliff Koroll (3)
Eddie Giacomin 21 saves / 25 shots		Goalie stats	Tony Esposito 28 saves / 29 shots

Chicago won series 4–1

=== Stanley Cup Final ===
It was the 16th playoff meeting between these two teams. Montreal lead 10–5 in their previous meetings. This was a rematch of the 1971 Stanley Cup Final, which Montreal won in seven games. Chicago won three of the five games in this year's regular season series.

April 29	Chicago Blackhawks	3–8	Montreal Canadiens	Montreal Forum	Recap
Pit Martin (6) – 00:35; Ralph Backstrom (5) – 01:02; Pit Martin (7) – 12:07		First period	02:28 – Jacques Laperriere (1); 08:07 – Marc Tardif (7)
No scoring		Second period	03:01 – Chuck Lefley (1); 16:23 – pp – Jacques Lemaire (5)
No scoring		Third period	08:38 – pp – Jacques Lemaire (6); 12:36 – sh – Peter Mahovlich (2); 13:34 – Frank Mahovlich (5); 14:35 – Chuck Lefley (2)
Tony Esposito 25 saves / 33 shots Gary Smith 5 saves / 5 shots		Goalie stats	Ken Dryden 27 saves / 30 shots

May 1	Chicago Blackhawks	1–4	Montreal Canadiens	Montreal Forum	Recap
No scoring		First period	05:36 – Pierre Bouchard (1)
Cliff Koroll (4) – 07:28		Second period	12:08 – Yvan Cournoyer (10)
No scoring		Third period	05:01 – pp – Yvan Cournoyer (11); 19:26 – en – Frank Mahovlich (6)
Tony Esposito 26 saves / 29 shots		Goalie stats	Ken Dryden 18 saves / 19 shots

May 3	Montreal Canadiens	4–7	Chicago Blackhawks	Chicago Stadium	Recap
No scoring		First period	01:59 – pp – Dennis Hull (7); 11:44 – pp – J.P. Bordeleau (1); 13:20 – sh – Bill White (1); 14:20 – sh – Stan Mikita (5)
Frank Mahovlich (7) – 10:25		Second period	02:08 – pp – John Marks (1)
Yvan Cournoyer (12) – 01:20; Guy Lapointe (6) – 07:15; Jacques Lemaire (7) – 08:01		Third period	19:29 – en – Dennis Hull (8); 19:49 – en – Jim Pappin (6)
Ken Dryden 30 saves / 35 shots		Goalie stats	Tony Esposito 29 saves / 33 shots

May 6	Montreal Canadiens	4–0	Chicago Blackhawks	Chicago Stadium	Recap
Marc Tardif (5) – 01:08		First period	No scoring
Yvan Cournoyer (13) – 14:13; Chuck Lefley (3) – 15:43		Second period	No scoring
Claude Larose (1) – 03:45		Third period	No scoring
Ken Dryden 19 saves / 19 shots		Goalie stats	Tony Esposito 26 saves / 30 shots

May 8	Chicago Blackhawks	8–7	Montreal Canadiens	Montreal Forum	Recap
Dennis Hull (9) – 09:34; Stan Mikita (6) – 11:24		First period	02:47 – Frank Mahovlich (8); 14:52 – pp – Peter Mahovlich (3)
Dave Kryskow (1) – 03:10; Stan Mikita (7) – 06:21; Jim Pappin (7) – 11:24; Len Frig (1) – pp – 16:21; Jim Pappin (8) – 19:03		Second period	00:37 – Claude Larose (2); 04:23 – Claude Larose (3); 07:09 – Yvan Cournoyer (14)
Lou Angotti (3) – 04:06		Third period	01:15 – Serge Savard (3); 11:43 – Henri Richard (5)
Tony Esposito 24 saves / 31 shots		Goalie stats	Ken Dryden 21 saves / 29 shots

May 10	Montreal Canadiens	6–4	Chicago Blackhawks	Chicago Stadium	Recap
Henri Richard (6) – 19:48		First period	10:35 – Pit Martin (8); 11:31 – pp – Pit Martin (9)
Peter Mahovlich (4) – 05:05; Rejean Houle (3) – 06:37; Frank Mahovlich (9) – pp – 10:54		Second period	08:32 – Dave Kryskow (2); 17:05 – pp – Pit Martin (10)
Yvan Cournoyer (15) – 08:13; Marc Tardif (6) – pp – 12:42		Third period	No scoring
Ken Dryden 23 saves / 27 shots		Goalie stats	Tony Esposito 27 saves / 33 shots

Montreal won series 4–2

== Awards ==
1973 NHL awards
Prince of Wales Trophy: (East Division champion, regular season)	Montreal Canadiens
Clarence S. Campbell Bowl: (West Division champion, regular season)	Chicago Black Hawks
Art Ross Trophy: (Top scorer, regular season)	Phil Esposito, Boston Bruins
Bill Masterton Memorial Trophy: (Perseverance, sportsmanship, and dedication)	Lowell MacDonald, Pittsburgh Penguins
Calder Memorial Trophy: (Top first-year player)	Steve Vickers, New York Rangers
Conn Smythe Trophy: (Most valuable player, playoffs)	Yvan Cournoyer, Montreal Canadiens
Hart Memorial Trophy: (Most valuable player, regular season)	Bobby Clarke, Philadelphia Flyers
James Norris Memorial Trophy: (Best defenceman)	Bobby Orr, Boston Bruins
Lady Byng Memorial Trophy: (Excellence and sportsmanship)	Gilbert Perreault, Buffalo Sabres
Lester B. Pearson Award: (Outstanding player, regular season)	Bobby Clarke, Philadelphia Flyers
Vezina Trophy: (Goaltender(s) of team with best goaltending record)	Ken Dryden, Montreal Canadiens

=== All-Star teams ===
First team	Position	Second team
Ken Dryden, Montreal Canadiens	G	Tony Esposito, Chicago Black Hawks
Bobby Orr, Boston Bruins	D	Brad Park, New York Rangers
Guy Lapointe, Montreal Canadiens	D	Bill White, Chicago Black Hawks
Phil Esposito, Boston Bruins	C	Bobby Clarke, Philadelphia Flyers
Mickey Redmond, Detroit Red Wings	RW	Yvan Cournoyer, Montreal Canadiens
Frank Mahovlich, Montreal Canadiens	LW	Dennis Hull, Chicago Black Hawks

== Player statistics ==
=== Scoring leaders ===
Player	Team	GP	G	A	Pts	PIM
Phil Esposito	Boston Bruins	78	55	75	130	87
Bobby Clarke	Philadelphia Flyers	78	37	67	104	80
Bobby Orr	Boston Bruins	63	29	72	101	99
Rick MacLeish	Philadelphia Flyers	78	50	50	100	69
Jacques Lemaire	Montreal Canadiens	77	44	51	95	16
Jean Ratelle	New York Rangers	78	41	53	94	12
Mickey Redmond	Detroit Red Wings	76	52	41	93	24
Johnny Bucyk	Boston Bruins	78	40	53	93	12
Frank Mahovlich	Montreal Canadiens	78	38	55	93	51
Jim Pappin	Chicago Black Hawks	76	41	51	92	82

Source: NHL.

=== Leading goaltenders ===
Note: GP = Games played; Min = Minutes played; GA = Goals against; GAA = Goals against average; W = Wins; L = Losses; T = Ties; SO = Shutouts

Player	Team	GP	MIN	GA	GAA	W	L	T	SO
Ken Dryden	Montreal Canadiens	54	3165	119	2.26	33	7	13	6
Gilles Villemure	New York Rangers	34	2040	78	2.29	20	12	2	3
Tony Esposito	Chicago Black Hawks	56	3340	140	2.51	32	17	7	4
Roy Edwards	Detroit Red Wings	52	3012	132	2.63	27	17	7	6
Dave Dryden	Buffalo Sabres	37	2018	89	2.65	14	13	7	3
Roger Crozier	Buffalo Sabres	49	2633	121	2.76	23	13	7	3
Doug Favell	Philadelphia Flyers	44	2419	114	2.83	20	15	4	3
Rogie Vachon	Los Angeles Kings	53	3120	148	2.85	22	20	10	4
Cesare Maniago	Minnesota North Stars	47	2736	132	2.89	21	18	6	5
Jim Rutherford	Pittsburgh Penguins	49	2660	129	2.91	20	22	5	3

=== Other statistics ===
- Plus-minus leader: Jacques Laperriere, Montreal Canadiens

== Coaches ==
=== East ===
- Boston Bruins: Tom Johnson and Bep Guidolin
- Buffalo Sabres: Joe Crozier
- Detroit Red Wings: Johnny Wilson
- Montreal Canadiens: Scotty Bowman
- New York Islanders: Phil Goyette and Earl Ingarfield
- New York Rangers: Emile Francis
- Toronto Maple Leafs: John McLellan
- Vancouver Canucks: Vic Stasiuk

=== West ===
- Atlanta Flames: Bernie Geoffrion
- California Golden Seals: Garry Young and Fred Glover
- Chicago Black Hawks: Billy Reay
- Los Angeles Kings: Bob Pulford
- Minnesota North Stars: Jack Gordon
- Philadelphia Flyers: Fred Shero
- Pittsburgh Penguins: Red Kelly
- St. Louis Blues: Al Arbour and Jean-Guy Talbot

== Debuts ==
The following is a list of players of note who played their first NHL game in 1972–73 (listed with their first team, asterisk(*) marks debut in playoffs):

- Dan Bouchard, Atlanta Flames
- Jacques Richard, Atlanta Flames
- Jim Schoenfeld, Buffalo Sabres
- Phil Russell, Chicago Black Hawks
- Robbie Ftorek, Detroit Red Wings
- Steve Shutt, Montreal Canadiens
- Larry Robinson, Montreal Canadiens
- Bob Nystrom, New York Islanders
- Billy Harris, New York Islanders
- Steve Vickers, New York Rangers
- Bill Barber, Philadelphia Flyers
- Jimmy Watson, Philadelphia Flyers
- Tom Bladon, Philadelphia Flyers
- Denis Herron, Pittsburgh Penguins
- Connie Madigan, St. Louis Blues
- Don Lever, Vancouver Canucks

== Last games ==
The following is a list of players of note that played their last game in the NHL in 1972–73 (listed with their last team):

- Jacques Plante, Boston Bruins
- Pat Stapleton, Chicago Black Hawks
- Ralph Backstrom, Chicago Black Hawks
- Harry Howell, Los Angeles Kings
- Ron Stewart, New York Islanders
- Ken Schinkel, Pittsburgh Penguins
- Connie Madigan, St. Louis BLues
- Bob Baun, Toronto Maple Leafs
- Dave Balon, Vancouver Canucks

NOTE: Plante, Stapleton, Backstrom, Howell and Balon would finish their major professional careers in the World Hockey Association.

== Broadcasting ==
Hockey Night in Canada on CBC Television televised Saturday night regular season games and Stanley Cup playoff games. HNIC also produced Wednesday night regular season game telecasts for CTV.

This was the first season under the U.S. rights agreement with NBC, airing weekend afternoon regular season games and playoff games.

== See also ==
- List of Stanley Cup champions
- 1972 NHL amateur draft
- 1972 NHL expansion draft
- 1972–73 NHL transactions
- 26th National Hockey League All-Star Game
- National Hockey League All-Star Game
- 1972 Summit Series
- World Hockey Association
- List of WHA seasons
- Lester Patrick Trophy
- 1972 in sports
- 1973 in sports
