= Murray Wilson =

Canadian ice hockey player

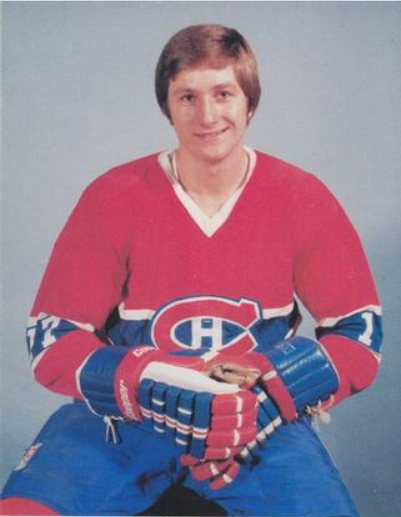
- Wilson in 1976 card
- Born: November 7, 1951 (age 74) Toronto, Ontario, Canada
- Height: 6 ft 1 in (185 cm)
- Weight: 180 lb (82 kg; 12 st 12 lb)
- Position: Centre
- Shot: Left
- Played for: Montreal Canadiens; Los Angeles Kings
- NHL draft: 11th overall, 1971; Montreal Canadiens
- Playing career: 1971–1979

Murray Charles Wilson (born November 7, 1951) is a Canadian former professional ice hockey forward. He played in the National Hockey League (NHL) with the Montreal Canadiens and Los Angeles Kings between 1972 and 1979. With the Canadiens he won the Stanley Cup four times.

== Playing career ==
Wilson started his National Hockey League career with the Montreal Canadiens in 1971. Wilson was drafted 11th overall in the 1971 NHL Amateur Draft. He would spend 7 years in Montreal before being traded to the Los Angeles Kings. He won one Calder Cup in the AHL and the Stanley Cup four times with the Canadiens.

He is the brother of former San Jose Sharks GM Doug Wilson.

His name is incorrectly spelled on the Stanley Cup for the 1973, 1976, and 1977 Montreal Canadiens. It appears as "Murry Wilson" missing an a. The name was correctly spelled in 1978 as Murray Wilson.

== Career statistics ==
=== Regular season and playoffs ===
			Regular season					Playoffs
Season	Team	League	GP	G	A	Pts	PIM	GP	G	A	Pts	PIM
1967–68	Ottawa 67's	OHA	24	7	11	18	8	—	—	—	—	—
1968–69	Ottawa 67's	OHA	46	24	26	50	48	—	—	—	—	—
1969–70	Ottawa 67's	OHA	52	22	24	46	53	—	—	—	—	—
1970–71	Ottawa 67's	OHA	44	26	32	58	36	—	—	—	—	—
1971–72	Nova Scotia Voyageurs	AHL	65	11	21	32	30	15	2	7	9	17
1972–73	Montreal Canadiens	NHL	52	18	9	27	16	16	2	4	6	6
1973–74	Montreal Canadiens	NHL	72	17	14	31	26	5	1	0	1	2
1974–75	Montreal Canadiens	NHL	73	24	18	42	44	5	0	3	3	4
1975–76	Montreal Canadiens	NHL	59	11	24	35	36	12	1	1	2	6
1976–77	Montreal Canadiens	NHL	60	13	14	27	26	14	1	6	7	14
1977–78	Montreal Canadiens	NHL	12	0	1	1	0	—	—	—	—	—
1978–79	Los Angeles Kings	NHL	58	11	15	26	14	1	0	0	0	0
NHL totals			386	94	95	189	162	68	7	21	28	49

Preceded by Chuck Arnason	Montreal Canadiens first-round draft pick 1971	Succeeded by Steve Shutt
