= Cliff Koroll =

Canadian ice hockey player

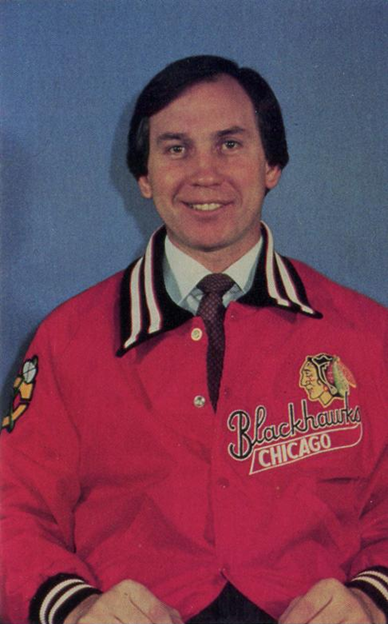
- Koroll in 1985
- Born: October 1, 1946 (age 79) Canora, Saskatchewan, Canada
- Height: 6 ft 1 in (185 cm)
- Weight: 195 lb (88 kg; 13 st 13 lb)
- Position: Right wing
- Shot: Right
- Played for: Chicago Black Hawks
- Playing career: 1969–1980

Clifford Eugene Koroll (born October 1, 1946) is a Canadian former professional ice hockey right winger who played for the Chicago Black Hawks of the National Hockey League between 1969 and 1980. He played in two Stanley Cup Final series with the Black Hawks (1971 and 1973).

== Playing career ==
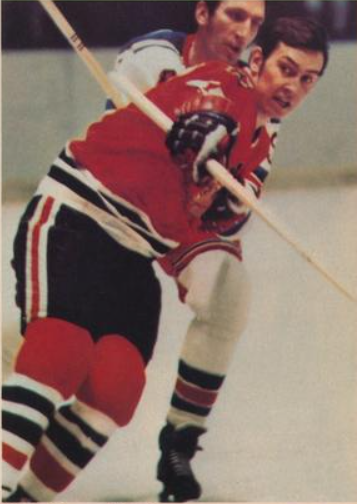
1971 photo of Koroll for Chicago

After earning all-WCHA honours at the University of Denver in 1968, Koroll signed an NHL contract and played his entire National Hockey League career with the Chicago Black Hawks. He then became as assistant coach for the Blackhawks for six seasons (1980–1984 and 1985–1987). In the 1984–85 season he served as head coach for the Milwaukee Admirals of the International Hockey League.

Koroll served as president of the Chicago Blackhawks Alumni Association. On October 19, 2006 he was inducted into the Hockey Hall of Fame at his alma mater, the University of Denver. He was also inducted into the Chicago Sports Hall of Fame. In the summer of 2015, he was inducted into the Saskatchewan Sports Hall Of Fame.

== Career statistics ==
=== Regular season and playoffs ===
			Regular season					Playoffs
Season	Team	League	GP	G	A	Pts	PIM	GP	G	A	Pts	PIM
1965–66	University of Denver	WCHA	32	21	10	31	23	—	—	—	—	—
1966–67	University of Denver	WCHA	25	18	19	37	34	—	—	—	—	—
1967–68	University of Denver	WCHA	34	18	22	40	55	—	—	—	—	—
1968–69	Dallas Black Hawks	CHL	67	28	34	62	50	11	2	8	10	15
1969–70	Chicago Black Hawks	NHL	73	18	19	37	44	8	1	4	5	9
1970–71	Chicago Black Hawks	NHL	72	16	34	50	85	18	7	9	16	18
1971–72	Chicago Black Hawks	NHL	76	22	23	45	51	8	0	0	0	11
1972–73	Chicago Black Hawks	NHL	77	33	24	57	38	16	4	6	10	6
1973–74	Chicago Black Hawks	NHL	78	21	25	46	32	11	2	5	7	13
1974–75	Chicago Black Hawks	NHL	80	27	32	59	27	8	3	5	8	8
1975–76	Chicago Black Hawks	NHL	80	25	33	58	29	4	1	0	1	0
1976–77	Chicago Black Hawks	NHL	80	15	26	41	25	2	0	0	0	0
1977–78	Chicago Black Hawks	NHL	73	16	15	31	19	4	1	0	1	0
1978–79	Chicago Black Hawks	NHL	78	12	19	31	20	4	0	0	0	0
1979–80	Chicago Black Hawks	NHL	47	3	4	7	6	2	0	0	0	2
NHL totals			814	208	254	462	376	85	19	29	48	67

== Awards and honours ==
Award	Year
All-WCHA Second team	1967–68
