= Claude Larose (ice hockey, born 1942) =

Canadian ice hockey player

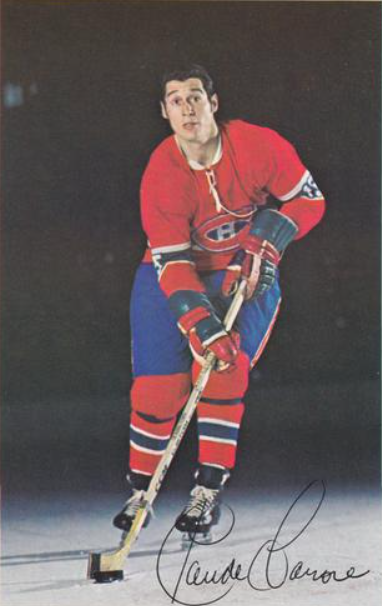
- Born: March 2, 1942 (age 84) Hearst, Ontario, Canada
- Height: 6 ft 0 in (183 cm)
- Weight: 170 lb (77 kg; 12 st 2 lb)
- Position: Right wing
- Shot: Right
- Played for: Montreal Canadiens; Minnesota North Stars; St. Louis Blues
- Playing career: 1962–1978

Claude David Larose (born March 2, 1942) is a Canadian former professional ice hockey player who played 943 career NHL games for the Montreal Canadiens, Minnesota North Stars and St. Louis Blues. He also served as an assistant coach for the Hartford Whalers after his retirement. He won 6 Stanley Cups during his career, five coming as a player (1965, 1966, 1968, 1971, 1973) and one as a scout in 2006.

== Early life ==
Larose was born in Hearst, Ontario. He played junior hockey with the Peterborough Petes.

== Career ==
Over a 16-year career, 10 with the Canadiens, Larose scored 226 goals and added 257 assists for 483 points in 943 NHL games. He also had 887 career penalty minutes and led the Canadiens in penalties during the 1971 Stanley Cup Playoffs, when Montreal upset both the defending champion Boston Bruins and the Chicago Black Hawks.

Playing on a line with Minnesota North Stars teammates Grant and Danny O'Shea, Larose scored the tying, the final goal in the 1969 NHL All-Star Game.

Returning from an injury in 1974, Larose was thrown onto a line with the Mahovlich brothers, Frank and Peter, and scored four goals against Pittsburgh's Gary Inness. He got a hat trick the next game while playing the right wing with Jacques Lemaire and Steve Shutt. Paired with them again, he got two goals in the following game.

Since retiring from professional hockey, Larose worked as a scout for the Carolina Hurricanes.

== Personal life ==
Larose is the father of NHL player Guy Larose.

== Career statistics ==
			Regular season					Playoffs
Season	Team	League	GP	G	A	Pts	PIM	GP	G	A	Pts	PIM
1959–60	Peterborough Petes	OHA-Jr.	48	9	10	19	34	12	2	7	9	17
1960–61	Peterborough Petes	OHA-Jr.	46	36	27	63	108	5	5	0	5	31
1961–62	Peterborough Petes	OHA-Jr.	50	18	36	54	150	—	—	—	—	—
1961–62	Hull-Ottawa Canadiens	EPHL	1	0	1	1	2	6	3	1	4	6
1962–63	Montreal Canadiens	NHL	4	0	0	0	0	—	—	—	—	—
1962–63	Hull-Ottawa Canadiens	EPHL	49	19	24	43	42	3	1	0	1	2
1963–64	Montreal Canadiens	NHL	21	1	1	2	43	2	1	0	1	0
1963–64	Omaha Knights	CPHL	47	27	22	49	105	8	8	6	14	17
1964–65	Montreal Canadiens	NHL	68	21	16	37	82	13	0	1	1	14
1965–66	Montreal Canadiens	NHL	64	15	18	33	67	6	0	1	1	31
1966–67	Montreal Canadiens	NHL	69	19	16	35	82	10	1	5	6	15
1967–68	Montreal Canadiens	NHL	42	2	9	11	28	12	3	2	5	8
1967–68	Houston Apollos	CPHL	10	6	7	13	32	—	—	—	—	—
1968–69	Minnesota North Stars	NHL	67	25	37	62	106	—	—	—	—	—
1969–70	Minnesota North Stars	NHL	75	24	23	47	109	6	1	1	2	25
1970–71	Montreal Canadiens	NHL	64	10	13	23	90	11	1	0	1	10
1971–72	Montreal Canadiens	NHL	77	20	18	38	64	6	2	1	3	23
1972–73	Montreal Canadiens	NHL	73	11	23	34	30	17	3	4	7	6
1973–74	Montreal Canadiens	NHL	39	17	7	24	52	5	0	2	2	11
1974–75	Montreal Canadiens	NHL	8	1	2	3	6	—	—	—	—	—
1974–75	St. Louis Blues	NHL	56	10	17	27	38	2	1	1	2	0
1975–76	St. Louis Blues	NHL	67	13	25	38	48	3	0	0	0	0
1976–77	St. Louis Blues	NHL	80	29	19	48	22	4	1	0	1	0
1977–78	St. Louis Blues	NHL	69	8	13	21	20	—	—	—	—	—
NHL totals			943	226	257	483	887	97	14	18	32	143

== See also ==
- Stanley Cup
- List of Stanley Cup champions

Preceded by Elmer Vasko	Minnesota North Stars captain 1969–70	Succeeded by Ted Harris
