= J. P. Bordeleau =

Canadian ice hockey player (born 1949)

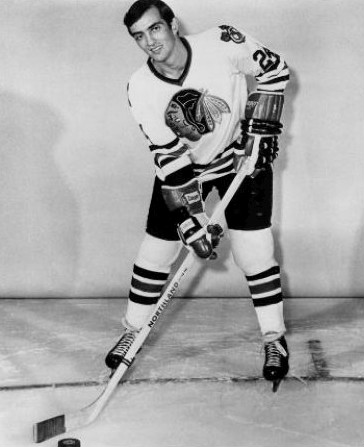
- Bordeleau in 1970.
- Born: June 13, 1949 (age 76) Noranda, Quebec, Canada
- Height: 6 ft 1 in (185 cm)
- Weight: 175 lb (79 kg; 12 st 7 lb)
- Position: Right wing
- Shot: Right
- Played for: Chicago Black Hawks
- NHL draft: 13th overall, 1969; Chicago Black Hawks
- Playing career: 1969–1982

Jean-Pierre Bordeleau (born June 13, 1949) is a Canadian former professional ice hockey player who played 519 NHL games between 1970 and 1980, all for the Chicago Black Hawks, the team that drafted him in the first round of the 1969 NHL Amateur Draft. He featured in the 1973 Stanley Cup Finals.

Bordeleau's brothers Christian Bordeleau and Paulin Bordeleau also played in the National Hockey League, as did his nephew Sebastien.

== Career statistics ==
=== Regular season and playoffs ===
			Regular season					Playoffs
Season	Team	League	GP	G	A	Pts	PIM	GP	G	A	Pts	PIM
1965–66	Noranda Copper Kings	QNWJHL	24	15	17	32	89	—	—	—	—	—
1966–67	Noranda Copper Kings	QNWJHL	24	33	32	65	121	—	—	—	—	—
1967–68	Montreal Junior Canadiens	OHA	54	22	21	43	96	11	2	4	6	8
1968–69	Montreal Junior Canadiens	OHA	51	17	36	53	150	14	2	11	13	8
1968–69	Montreal Junior Canadiens	M-Cup	—	—	—	—	—	4	4	1	5	10
1969–70	Dallas Black Hawks	CHL	62	14	15	29	44	—	—	—	—	—
1969–70	Chicago Black Hawks	NHL	—	—	—	—	—	1	0	0	0	0
1970–71	Dallas Black Hawks	CHL	35	15	15	30	48	6	2	0	2	4
1971–72	Chicago Black Hawks	NHL	3	0	2	2	2	—	—	—	—	—
1971–72	Dallas Black Hawks	CHL	70	41	31	72	72	12	10	2	12	0
1972–73	Chicago Black Hawks	NHL	73	15	15	30	6	14	1	0	1	4
1973–74	Chicago Black Hawks	NHL	64	11	9	20	11	11	0	2	2	2
1974–75	Chicago Black Hawks	NHL	59	7	8	15	4	7	2	2	4	2
1975–76	Chicago Black Hawks	NHL	76	12	18	30	6	4	0	0	0	0
1976–77	Chicago Black Hawks	NHL	60	15	14	29	20	2	0	0	0	2
1977–78	Chicago Black Hawks	NHL	76	15	15	30	32	4	0	1	1	0
1978–79	Chicago Black Hawks	NHL	63	15	21	36	34	4	0	1	1	2
1979–80	Chicago Black Hawks	NHL	45	7	14	21	28	1	0	0	0	0
1980–81	New Brunswick Hawks	AHL	64	24	28	52	71	13	4	9	13	6
1981–82	New Brunswick Hawks	AHL	15	5	8	13	10	—	—	—	—	—
NHL totals			519	97	116	213	143	48	3	6	9	12
AHL totals			79	29	36	65	81	13	4	9	13	6

Preceded by John Marks	Chicago Black Hawks first-round draft pick 1969	Succeeded by Dan Maloney
