= Frank Mahovlich =

Canadian ice hockey player and politician (born 1938)

Frank Mahovlich CM
- Hockey Hall of Fame, 1981
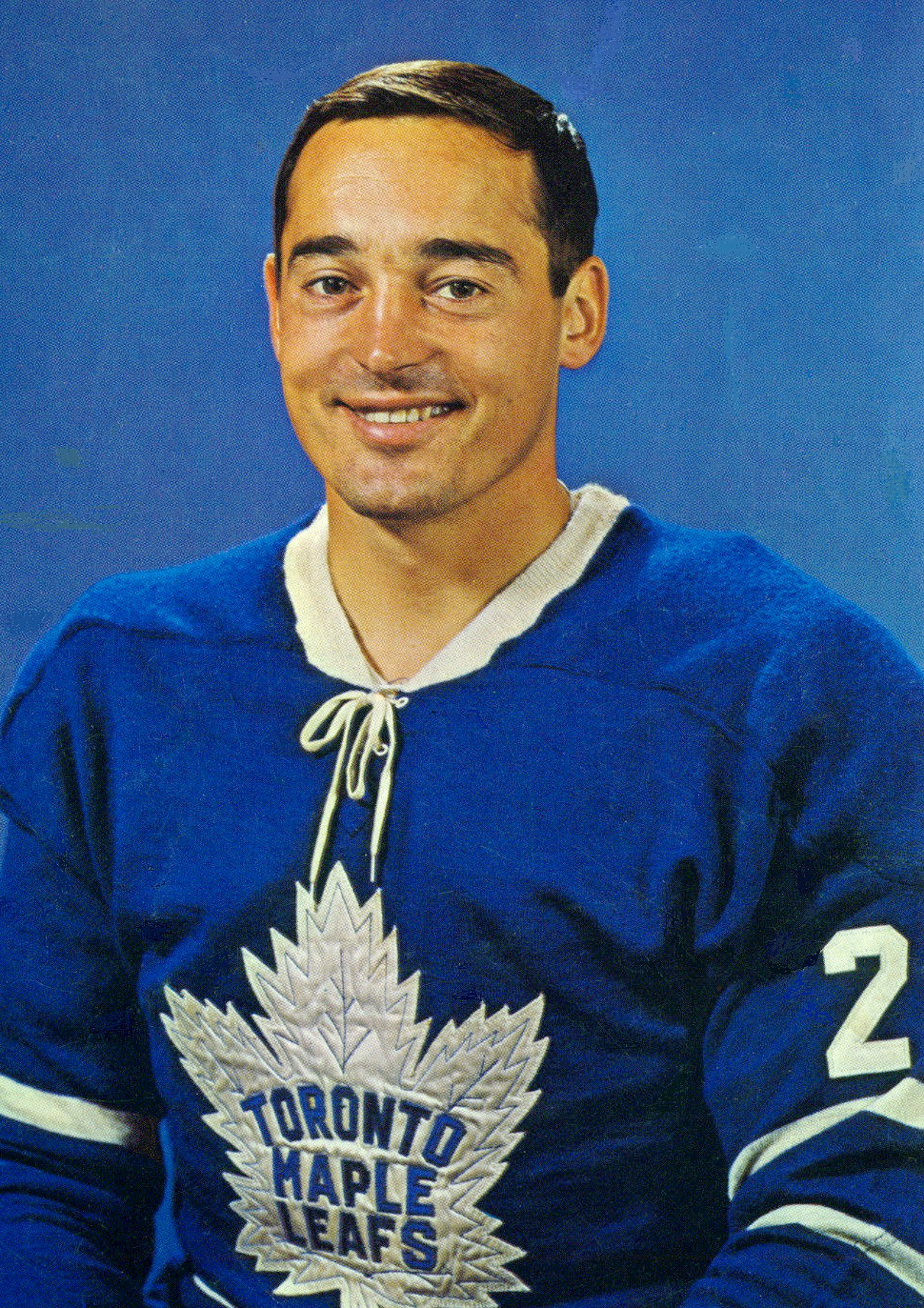
- Mahovlich with the Toronto Maple Leafs, c. 1963
- Born: January 10, 1938 (age 88) Timmins, Ontario, Canada
- Height: 6 ft 1 in (185 cm)
- Weight: 205 lb (93 kg; 14 st 9 lb)
- Position: Left wing
- Shot: Left
- Played for: Toronto Maple Leafs; Detroit Red Wings; Montreal Canadiens; Toronto Toros; Birmingham Bulls
- National team: Canada
- Playing career: 1957–1978

Canadian Senator from Ontario
- In office June 11, 1998 – January 10, 2013
- Nominated by: Jean Chrétien
- Appointed by: Roméo LeBlanc

Personal details
- Party: Liberal

Francis William Mahovlich CM (muh-HOV-litch; born January 10, 1938) is a Canadian former professional ice hockey player and a former Liberal Senator in the Canadian Senate. He played on six Stanley Cup-winning teams and is an inductee of the Hockey Hall of Fame. In 2017 Mahovlich was named one of the '100 Greatest NHL Players' in history. Mahovlich was inducted into the Ontario Sports Hall of Fame in 1999. His brother Peter also played in the NHL. His nickname is "the Big M".

== Playing career ==
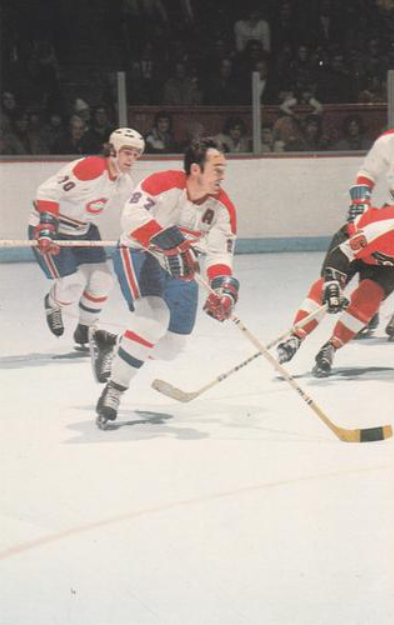
Mahovlich in action, c. 1973 for Montreal Canadiens

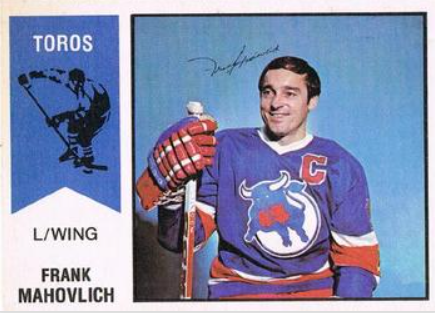
Mahovlich in 1974–75 card for Toronto Toros

Mahovlich is the son of Croatian immigrants. He was scouted by several National Hockey League teams while playing for the Schumacher Lions of the Northern Ontario Hockey Association. He signed with the Toronto Maple Leafs, who sent him to one of their Ontario Hockey Association affiliates, the Toronto St. Michael's Majors. Mahovlich played there while attending St. Michael's College School from 1954 to 1957. While at St. Michael's, he received instruction from Joe Primeau, who Mahovlich would later call the best coach he ever had. Mahovlich received the Red Tilson Trophy as the top player in the OHA for the 1956–57 season, in which he scored 52 goals in 49 games.

He joined the Leafs in 1957 and was a 20-goal scorer in his first season, winning the Calder Memorial Trophy as rookie of the year in what was otherwise a rough season with the last-place Leafs. During the off-season, he took courses at Assumption University in Windsor, Ontario. At the same time, Punch Imlach was hired to run the Leafs and soon became head coach and general manager.

In the 1960–61 season, Imlach put Mahovlich on a line with Red Kelly and Bob Nevin. The three immediately clicked and were the team's top three scorers that year, led by Mahovlich's 48 goals—a Leaf record that would stand for 21 years. The following season, the Leafs won the Stanley Cup, and repeated as champions in 1963 and 1964. Mahovlich led the team in goals scored in all three seasons.

Initially, Mahovlich and Imlach got along well, but their relationship deteriorated after winning the 1962 Stanley Cup, particularly when Mahovlich's contract was up for renewal at the end of the 1962 season. He felt the Leafs gave him a low-ball offer and walked out on the team during training camp in September. Red Burnett at the Toronto Star described the situation as a "cold war" between Imlach and Mahovlich.

At that time, the National Hockey League All-Star Game was played at the beginning of the season, and during a reception in Toronto attended by team executives in the days before the 1962 game, Chicago Black Hawks owner James D. Norris offered the Leafs $1 million for Mahovlich. He believed he had an agreement with Leafs co-owner Harold Ballard and paid $1,000 as a deposit with the balance to be delivered by cheque the next morning. The next day, the Leafs gave Mahovlich the money he had been asking for and told the Black Hawks that their apparent agreement the night before had been a misunderstanding. The Leafs returned the $1,000 deposit. The Black Hawks accused the Leafs of reneging on a deal. Conn Smythe, at this point a minority shareholder in the Leafs, was adamant that the deal should be rejected. Mahovlich eventually spoke out publicly and reaffirmed his commitment to the Leafs.

Mahovlich also had a rocky relationship with fans at Maple Leaf Gardens and was often booed at home games due to the perceived inconsistency of his play. Imlach—who mispronounced Mahovlich's name for years (calling him "Ma-hall-ov-ich")—became a constant critic and, under pressure from fans and management, Mahovlich was admitted to Toronto General Hospital in November 1964, suffering from what was publicly described as "constant fatigue" but diagnosed as acute depression. Mahovlich was flooded with well-wishes from fans during his time off. He returned to the lineup a month later and was still able to lead the Leafs in scoring in the 1964–65 season, despite missing 11 games. Mahovlich led the Leafs in scoring again in the 1965–66 season.

The Leafs won the Stanley Cup in the 1966–67 season, with Mahovlich having his lowest-scoring year in seven seasons, although he played well in the playoffs to help win the Cup. Early into the next season, Mahovlich was again admitted to hospital, although this time it was acknowledged publicly as depression and tension. "Mahovlich is a sensitive, easily-bruised individual," wrote Milt Dunnell in a page-one story in the Toronto Star.

Mahovlich was part of a six-player blockbuster transaction in which he was traded along with Pete Stemkowski and Garry Unger from the Maple Leafs to the Detroit Red Wings for Norm Ullman, Paul Henderson and Floyd Smith on March 4, 1968. The Maple Leafs and Red Wings were in fifth and sixth place respectively at the bottom of the East Division standings. He had 19 goals and 17 assists in 50 games that season and was the leading goalscorer in Maple Leafs franchise history with 296 at the time of the deal. He joined a Red Wings team that also featured his younger brother Pete. He said in a press conference announcing the trade, "Business is business and if I can't please them here, maybe I'll be able to please them there."

Mahovlich had a strong finish to the season with the Red Wings, and the following year put up his best point totals in eight seasons, playing on a line with Gordie Howe and Alex Delvecchio, and setting his record for goals in a season with 49. Initially, one of his teammates on the Red Wings was his younger brother, Peter Mahovlich, who split his time between the Wings and their minor league affiliate.

In 1970–71, Red Wings general manager Sid Abel wanted to get rid of coach Ned Harkness and was overruled by team owner Bruce Norris. Once Harkness took over as general manager, he got rid of players he deemed a threat to him. On January 13, 1971, Mahovlich was traded to the Montreal Canadiens for Mickey Redmond, Guy Charron, and Bill Collins. He was reunited with his brother, who had become a star player himself with the Canadiens. Mahovlich spent three-and-a-half seasons in Montreal, playing on the Stanley Cup-winning teams of 1971 and 1973, setting an all-time post-season goal scoring record in 1971. During the 1971–72 season, Mahovlich scored a career-high 96 points, which he nearly matched the following season with 93 points.

He also was a member of Team Canada for the 1972 Summit Series against the Soviet Union. In 1974, he left the NHL for the World Hockey Association and represented Canada again at the 1974 Summit Series. The Dayton Aeros (which subsequently became the Houston Aeros (WHA)) had drafted Mahovlich in the regular round of the WHA general player draft on February 12, 1972, and they traded his rights away to the Toronto Toros in June of 1974 in return for future considerations. Frank signed a four-year contract with the Toronto Toros on June 19, 1974. He would play for the Toros and the Birmingham Bulls until his retirement in 1979 at the age of 41. While with the Bulls, Mahovlich was placed on an unproductive line with enforcers Frank Beaton and Dave Hanson, one of the Hanson Brothers who had been in the movie Slap Shot. According to John Brophy, when a reporter asked Mahovlich what was wrong, he replied, "I don't know, but I seem to play a lot better with Howe and Delvecchio."

He attempted an NHL comeback with the Detroit Red Wings in 1979, but it was unsuccessful, and he formally retired on October 7, 1979. The 533 goals he scored during his 1956 to 1974 NHL career were second only to Bobby Hull during that time, who scored 604.

In an NHL documentary about the Stanley Cup, Mahovlich claimed credit for being the first player to hoist the Stanley Cup above his head. After the Leafs' victory in the 1962 Cup Final, in the team locker room, Mahovlich said he held the Cup, felt how light it was, and hoisted it above his head, which was then photographed.

== Awards and achievements ==
- Calder Memorial Trophy winner in 1958.
- Played in 1959, 1960, 1961, 1962, 1963, 1964, 1965, 1967, 1968, 1969, 1970, 1971, 1972, 1973, and 1974 NHL All-Star Games.
- Selected to the NHL First All-Star Team in 1961, 1963, and 1973.
- Selected to the NHL Second All-Star Team in 1962, 1964, 1965, 1966, 1969, and 1970.
- Stanley Cup champion in 1962, 1963, 1964, 1967, 1971 and 1973.
- Inducted into the Hockey Hall of Fame in 1981.
- Inducted into Canada's Sports Hall of Fame in 1990.
- In 1997, he was ranked number 26 on The Hockey News' list of the 100 Greatest Hockey Players.
- Inaugural inductee into the World Hockey Association Hall of Fame as a "Legends of the Game" in 2010
- His #27 sweater was retired by the Toronto Maple Leafs (shared with Darryl Sittler) on October 15, 2016
- In January 2017, Mahovlich was part of the first group of players to be named one of the '100 Greatest NHL Players' in history.

== Career statistics ==
=== Regular season and playoffs ===
			Regular season					Playoffs
Season	Team	League	GP	G	A	Pts	PIM	GP	G	A	Pts	PIM
1953–54	Toronto St. Michael's Majors	OHA-Jr.	1	0	1	1	2	—	—	—	—	—
1954–55	Toronto St. Michael's Majors	OHA-Jr.	25	12	11	23	18	—	—	—	—	—
1955–56	Toronto St. Michael's Majors	OHA-Jr.	30	24	26	50	55	8	5	5	10	24
1956–57	Toronto St. Michael's Majors	OHA-Jr.	49	52	36	88	122	4	2	7	9	14
1956–57	Toronto Maple Leafs	NHL	3	1	0	1	2	—	—	—	—	—
1957–58	Toronto Maple Leafs	NHL	67	20	16	36	67	—	—	—	—	—
1958–59	Toronto Maple Leafs	NHL	63	22	27	49	94	12	5	6	11	18
1959–60	Toronto Maple Leafs	NHL	70	18	21	39	61	10	3	1	4	27
1960–61	Toronto Maple Leafs	NHL	70	48	36	84	131	5	1	1	2	6
1961–62	Toronto Maple Leafs	NHL	70	33	38	71	87	12	6	6	12	29
1962–63	Toronto Maple Leafs	NHL	67	36	37	73	56	9	0	2	2	8
1963–64	Toronto Maple Leafs	NHL	70	26	29	55	66	14	4	11	15	20
1964–65	Toronto Maple Leafs	NHL	59	23	28	51	76	6	0	3	3	9
1965–66	Toronto Maple Leafs	NHL	68	32	24	56	68	4	1	0	1	10
1966–67	Toronto Maple Leafs	NHL	63	18	28	46	44	12	3	7	10	8
1967–68	Toronto Maple Leafs	NHL	50	19	17	36	30	—	—	—	—	—
1967–68	Detroit Red Wings	NHL	13	7	9	16	2	—	—	—	—	—
1968–69	Detroit Red Wings	NHL	76	49	29	78	38	—	—	—	—	—
1969–70	Detroit Red Wings	NHL	74	38	32	70	59	4	0	0	0	2
1970–71	Detroit Red Wings	NHL	35	14	18	32	30	—	—	—	—	—
1970–71	Montreal Canadiens	NHL	38	17	24	41	11	20	14	13	27	18
1971–72	Montreal Canadiens	NHL	76	43	53	96	36	6	3	2	5	2
1972–73	Montreal Canadiens	NHL	78	38	55	93	51	17	9	14	23	6
1973–74	Montreal Canadiens	NHL	71	31	49	80	47	6	1	2	3	0
1974–75	Toronto Toros	WHA	73	38	44	82	27	6	3	0	3	2
1975–76	Toronto Toros	WHA	75	34	55	89	14	—	—	—	—	—
1976–77	Birmingham Bulls	WHA	17	3	20	23	12	—	—	—	—	—
1977–78	Birmingham Bulls	WHA	72	14	24	38	22	3	1	1	2	0
NHL totals			1,181	533	570	1,103	1,056	137	51	67	118	163
WHA totals			237	89	143	232	75	9	4	1	5	2

=== International ===
Year	Team	Event	GP	G	A	Pts	PIM
1972	Canada	SS	6	1	1	2	0
1974	Canada	SS	6	1	1	2	6
Senior totals			12	2	2	4	6

== Post-playing career ==
Mahovlich was inducted into the Hockey Hall of Fame in 1981 and Canada's Sports Hall of Fame in 1990. In 1994, he was made a Member of the Order of Canada.

In 1997, Mahovlich was ranked number 26 on The Hockey News's list of the 100 Greatest Hockey Players, the highest-ranking player who had spent at least a majority of his career with the Maple Leafs.

In 1998, Mahovlich was appointed to the Senate of Canada by Prime Minister Jean Chrétien. He retired from the senate on January 10, 2013, at the mandatory retirement age of 75.

== See also ==
- Lists of Canadian senators
- List of Ontario senators
- List of NHL statistical leaders
- List of NHL players with 1000 points
- Notable families in the NHL
- List of NHL players with 500 goals

Preceded by Larry Regan	Winner of the Calder Memorial Trophy; 1958	Succeeded by Ralph Backstrom
