= Dave Kryskow =

Canadian ice hockey player

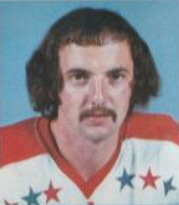
- Kryskow in 1974 stamp
- Born: December 25, 1951 (age 74) Edmonton, Alberta, Canada
- Height: 5 ft 10 in (178 cm)
- Weight: 175 lb (79 kg; 12 st 7 lb)
- Position: Left wing
- Shot: Left
- Played for: Chicago Black Hawks; Detroit Red Wings; Washington Capitals; Atlanta Flames; Calgary Cowboys; Winnipeg Jets
- NHL draft: 26th overall, 1971; Chicago Black Hawks
- Playing career: 1971–1978

David Roy Kryskow (/ˈkrɪskoʊ/ KRIHS-koh; born December 25, 1951) is a Canadian former ice hockey player.

== Career ==
Originally drafted by the Chicago Black Hawks in the 1971 NHL Amateur Draft, Kryskow played in Chicago for parts of two seasons.

On March 25, 1971, Kryskow scored 5 goals in Game 3 of the Edmonton Oil Kings' WCHL quarterfinal playoff series vs the Saskatoon Blades. This was also against his former team. Edmonton won the series in five games. Kryskow became the first player to ever score five goals in a playoff game in the WCHL. The record was tied in 1978, 1981, and 2011, but even 40 years later was not broken. Kryskow finished the 1971 playoffs for the WCHL Champion Oil Kings with 16 goals and 33 points in 17 playoff games.

Originally drafted by the Chicago Black Hawks in the 1971 NHL Amateur Draft, Kryskow played in Chicago for parts of two seasons. Kryskow played in 3 games and scored 2 goals (Game 5 and Game 6) in the 1973 Stanley Cup Finals for the Blackhawks. The Montreal Canadiens won the Stanley Cup in Game 6. Earlier that year on Jan. 19, 1973, Kryskow scored three shorthanded goals in the same game for the Dallas Blackhawks of the CHL. Kryskow had previously won the Adams Cup with Dallas in 1972. The shorthanded hat trick would be the first time a North American professional hockey player would accomplish this feat. Kryskow would end up with 4 goals for the night, and Dallas would beat Omaha 5-1.

In the 1974 NHL Expansion Draft, he would be claimed by the Washington Capitals. He was the first Washington Capitals player to score a shorthanded goal in franchise history. After playing 51 games for the Capitals, he was traded to the Detroit Red Wings. He would also play for the Atlanta Flames and the Tidewater Sharks of the SHL.

Kryskow finished his professional hockey career in the World Hockey Association playing for the Calgary Cowboys and closed his career by winning the 1978 Avco Cup with the Winnipeg Jets. The 1978 Winnipeg Jets were inducted into the Manitoba Hockey Hall of Fame in the team category and also beat the Soviet Union Team 5–3 on January 5, 1978.

== Career statistics ==
=== Regular season and playoffs ===
			Regular season					Playoffs
Season	Team	League	GP	G	A	Pts	PIM	GP	G	A	Pts	PIM
1969–70	Saskatoon Blades	WCHL	28	4	25	29	57	—	—	—	—	—
1969–70	Edmonton Oil Kings	WCHL	22	8	8	16	24	6	0	6	6	24
1970–71	Edmonton Oil Kings	WCHL	65	42	45	87	149	17	16	17	33	30
1971–72	Dallas Black Hawks	CHL	55	9	18	27	85	3	0	0	0	0
1972–73	Chicago Blackhawks	NHL	11	1	0	1	0	3	2	0	2	0
1972–73	Dallas Black Hawks	CHL	52	34	28	62	110	7	2	3	5	4
1973–74	Chicago Blackhawks	NHL	72	7	12	19	22	7	0	0	0	2
1974–75	Washington Capitals	NHL	51	9	15	24	83	—	—	—	—	—
1974–75	Detroit Red Wings	NHL	18	1	4	5	4	—	—	—	—	—
1975–76	Atlanta Flames	NHL	79	15	25	40	65	2	0	0	0	2
1976–77	Tidewater Sharks	SHL	37	16	23	39	95	—	—	—	—	—
1976–77	Calgary Cowboys	WHA	45	16	17	33	47	—	—	—	—	—
1977–78	Winnipeg Jets	WHA	71	20	21	41	16	9	4	4	8	2
WHA totals			116	36	38	74	63	9	4	4	8	2
NHL totals			231	33	56	89	14	12	2	0	2	4
