= John Marks (ice hockey) =

Canadian ice hockey player and coach

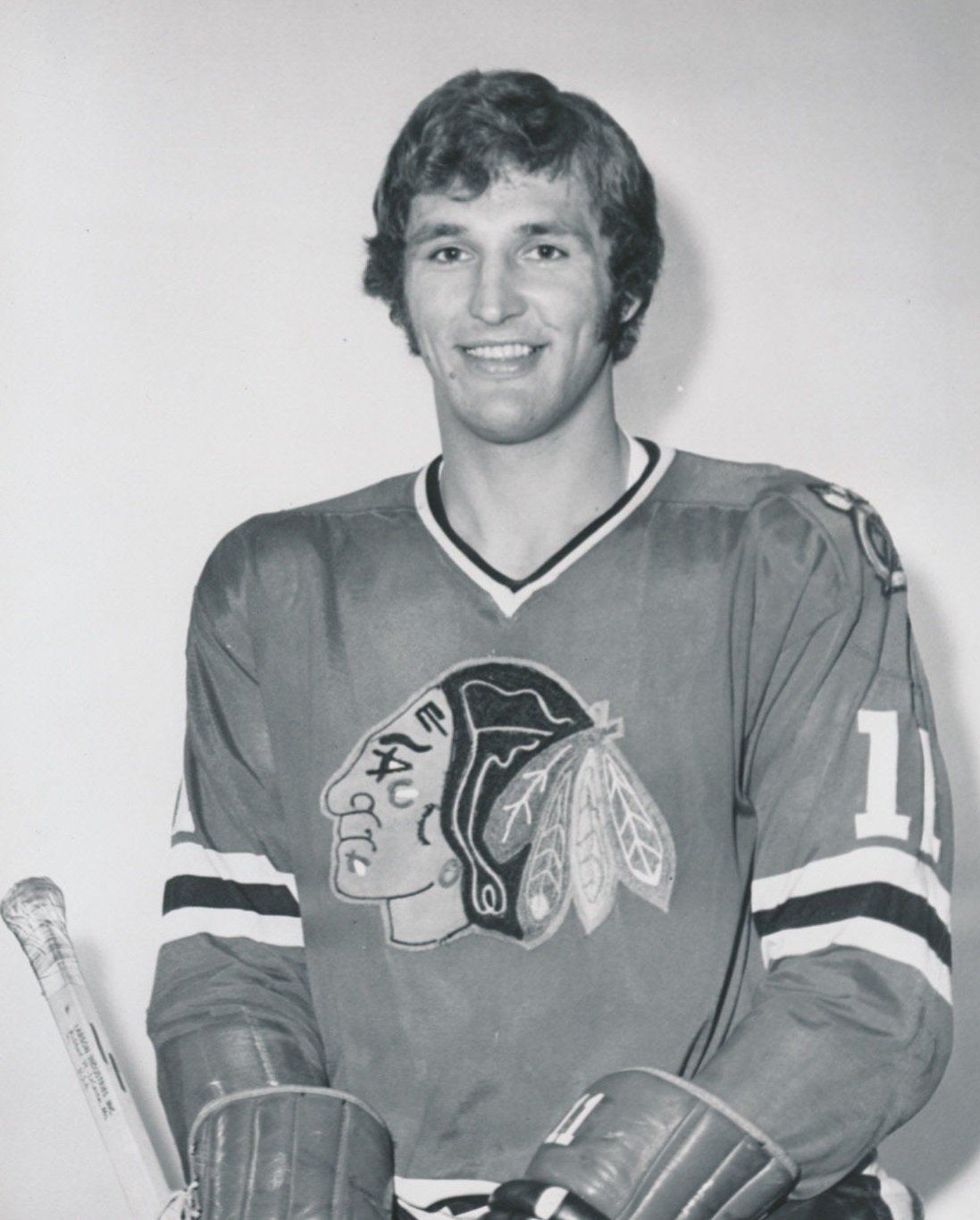
- Marks in 1973
- Born: March 22, 1948 (age 78) Hamiota, Manitoba, Canada
- Height: 6 ft 2 in (188 cm)
- Weight: 200 lb (91 kg; 14 st 4 lb)
- Position: Left wing
- Shot: Left
- Played for: Chicago Black Hawks
- NHL draft: 9th overall, 1968; Chicago Black Hawks
- Playing career: 1968–1988

John Garrison Marks (born March 22, 1948) is a Canadian former professional ice hockey player. He most recently worked as the head coach of the Fargo Force of the United States Hockey League.

== Career ==
Marks spent his 657-game NHL career with the Chicago Black Hawks, recording 112 goals and 163 assists for 275 points, as well as accumulating 330 penalty minutes.

From 1998 to 2006, he was the only head coach of the now-defunct Greenville Grrrowl of the ECHL. In 2002, he guided the South Carolina-based team to their only league championship in a four-game sweep of the Dayton Bombers; this was the first (and currently only) time an ECHL team has swept the Kelly Cup finals. With the victory, Marks also became the first coach in ECHL history to win two championships with two different teams.

For the 2006–07 season he was the head coach of the Fayetteville FireAntz of the Southern Professional Hockey League, leading the team to the President's Cup by taking first place in the playoffs. The championship was the first for the FireAntz as well as the first for the city of Fayetteville in 51 years.

Until they folded midway through the 2008–09 season, Marks was the head coach of the Augusta Lynx of the ECHL. He was also the head coach and director of player personnel for the Dayton Gems of the International Hockey League for the 2008–09 season.

On May 10, 2010, Marks was announced as the new head coach of the Winkler Flyers of the Manitoba Major Junior Hockey League. Marks became the head coach of the USHL's Fargo Force on July 18, 2011.

On December 1, 2011, it was announced that Marks would be inducted into the 2012 Class of the ECHL Hall of Fame.

== Personal life ==
Marks has two children.

== Career statistics ==
			Regular season					Playoffs
Season	Team	League	GP	G	A	Pts	PIM	GP	G	A	Pts	PIM
1966–67	St. James Braves	MJHL	6	1	3	4	0	—	—	—	—	—
1967–68	University of North Dakota	WCHA	33	3	6	9	16	—	—	—	—	—
1968–69	University of North Dakota	WCHA	29	6	26	32	38	—	—	—	—	—
1969–70	University of North Dakota	WCHA	30	5	14	19	34	—	—	—	—	—
1970–71	Dallas Black Hawks	CHL	66	3	16	19	34	10	0	4	4	14
1971–72	Dallas Black Hawks	CHL	72	8	35	43	105	12	1	2	3	8
1972–73	Chicago Black Hawks	NHL	55	3	10	13	21	16	1	2	3	2
1973–74	Chicago Black Hawks	NHL	76	13	18	31	22	11	2	0	2	8
1974–75	Chicago Black Hawks	NHL	80	17	30	47	56	8	2	6	8	34
1975–76	Chicago Black Hawks	NHL	80	21	23	44	43	4	0	0	0	10
1976–77	Chicago Black Hawks	NHL	80	7	15	22	41	2	0	0	0	4
1977–78	Chicago Black Hawks	NHL	80	15	22	37	26	4	0	1	1	0
1978–79	Chicago Black Hawks	NHL	80	21	24	45	35	4	0	0	0	2
1979–80	Chicago Black Hawks	NHL	74	6	15	21	51	4	0	0	0	0
1980–81	Chicago Black Hawks	NHL	39	8	6	14	28	3	0	0	0	0
1981–82	Chicago Black Hawks	NHL	13	1	0	1	7	1	0	0	0	0
1981–82	Indianapolis Checkers	CHL	53	6	20	26	73	—	—	—	—	—
1987–88	Kalamazoo Wings	IHL	1	1	0	1	0	—	—	—	—	—
CHL totals			191	17	71	88	227	22	1	6	7	22
NHL totals			657	112	163	275	330	57	5	9	14	60

== Awards and honours as player ==
Award	Year
All-WCHA Second team	1968–69
AHCA West All-American	1968–69
All-WCHA First Team	1969–70
AHCA West All-American	1969–70

- CHL Championship (1972)
- Played in NHL All-Star Game (1976)
- NCAA Championship (1987)
- Riley Cup winner (1996)
- Kelly Cup winner (2002)
- "Honoured Member" of the Manitoba Hockey Hall of Fame
- ECHL Hall of Fame (2012)

== Awards and honours as coach ==
Awards	Year
SPHL Coach of the Year	2006–07

Sporting positions
Preceded by Bob Tombari	Chicago Blackhawks first-round draft pick 1968	Succeeded by J. P. Bordeleau
