= Bill White (ice hockey) =

Canadian ice hockey player, coach (1939–2017)

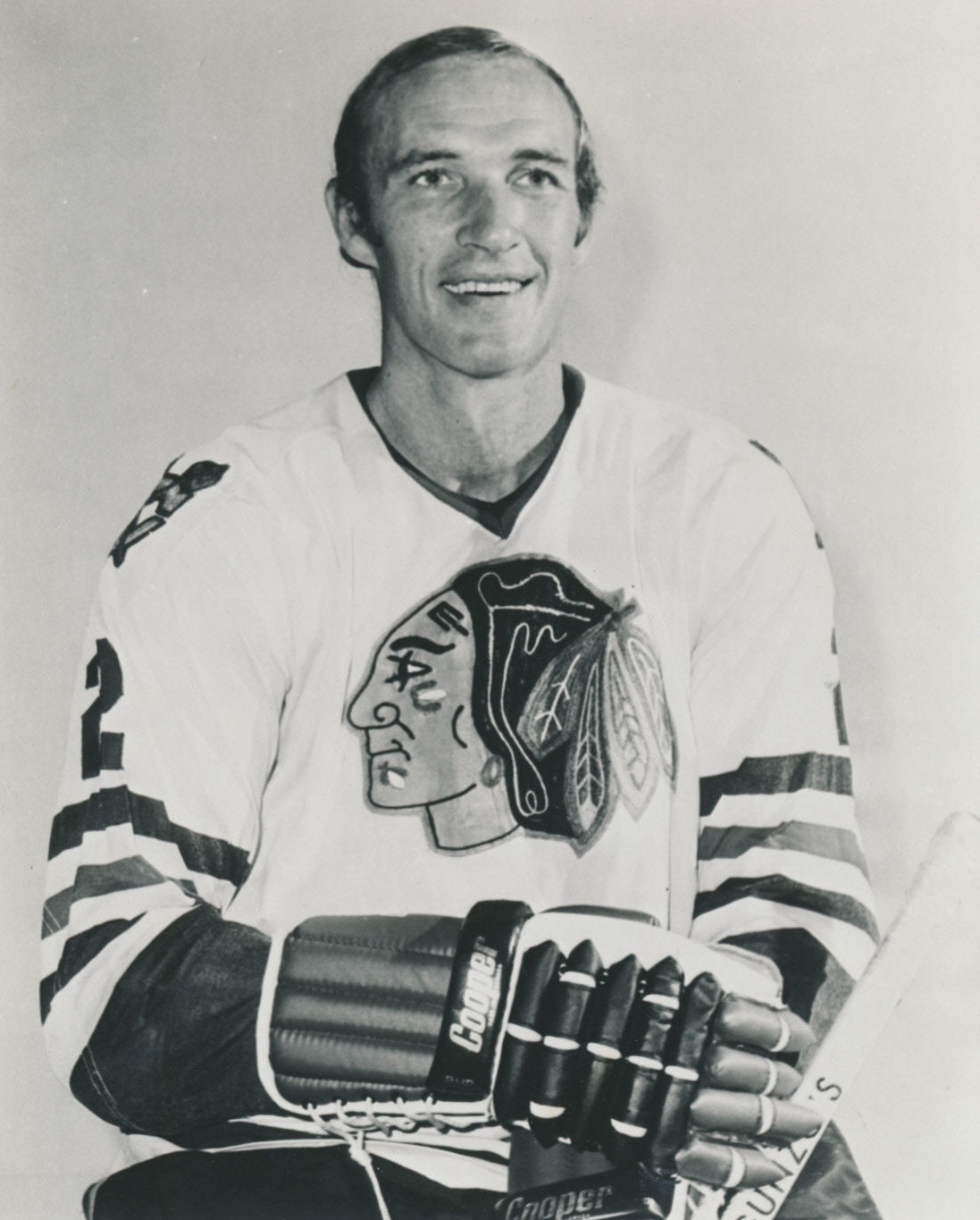
- White with the Chicago Black Hawks in 1973
- Born: August 26, 1939 Toronto, Ontario, Canada
- Died: May 21, 2017 (aged 77) Toronto, Ontario, Canada
- Height: 6 ft 2 in (188 cm)
- Weight: 190 lb (86 kg; 13 st 8 lb)
- Position: Defence
- Shot: Right
- Played for: Los Angeles Kings; Chicago Black Hawks
- National team: Canada
- Playing career: 1959–1976

William Earl White (August 26, 1939 – May 21, 2017) was a Canadian professional ice hockey player and coach. He played in the National Hockey League (NHL) with the Los Angeles Kings and Chicago Black Hawks from 1967 to 1976. He then coached Chicago during the 1976–77 season. White was one of the most notable defensive defencemen of the 1970s.

== Playing career ==
After playing his junior hockey for the Toronto Marlboros of the Ontario Hockey Association, White turned professional in 1960. Held back due to the paucity of jobs available in the Original Six days of the National Hockey League, he would star for seven seasons in the minor league American Hockey League, mostly for the Springfield Indians. While with the Indians, White was instrumental in the players' strikes which led to the prominence of agent Alan Eagleson and the creation of the National Hockey League Players' Association.

The Los Angeles Kings of the NHL acquired the rights to White in the 1967 NHL expansion, and White was the leading scorer amongst Kings' defenceman both full years he played for them. During the 1970 season, White was traded to the powerful Chicago Black Hawks, for whom he would play the remainder of his career. Paired with rushing defenceman Pat Stapleton, they formed one of the greatest defensive pairings of the decade, and despite recurring minor injuries, White averaged nearly 30 assists a season in his five full seasons with Chicago. During that time, he was named to the NHL's Second All-Star squad on defence in 1972, 1973 and 1974, as well as being named to play in the All-Star Game for six consecutive seasons between 1969 and 1974. He was also a member of the Canadian team in the 1972 Summit Series against the Soviet Union, playing eight games.

Already missing significant time in the previous seasons due to injuries, White suffered a neck injury in the 1976 playoffs from which he sustained lingering nerve damage, and retired in consequence.

White finished his NHL career with 50 goals, 215 assists and 265 points in 604 games, with 495 penalty minutes. At the time of his retirement, even though he had played only six full seasons with the Hawks, he was in the top five of all-time Black Hawk defence scorers.

== Team Canada 1972 member ==
White was chosen to be part of Team Canada '72 that battled the Soviet Union's National Team in a famous eight-game series in September 1972. White scored a goal for Canada in the decisive final game in Moscow. He also finished the series with a plus/minus of +7--the best mark of any Canadian player.

== Retirement and death ==
White replaced long-time Black Hawks coach Billy Reay as interim coach midway through the 1977 season, but failed to improve the team's fortunes and left after that season. He later went on to coach his old junior team, the Toronto Marlboros.

White died on May 21, 2017, at the age of 77.

== Career statistics ==
=== Regular season and playoffs ===
| | | | Regular season | | | | | Playoffs |
| Season | Team | League | GP | G | A | Pts | PIM | GP | G | A | Pts | PIM |
|---|---|---|---|---|---|---|---|---|---|---|---|---|
| 1956–57 | Weston Dukes | MetJHL | — | — | — | — | — | — | — | — | — | — |
| 1956–57 | Toronto Marlboros | OHA | 2 | 0 | 0 | 0 | 4 | — | — | — | — | — |
| 1957–58 | Toronto Marlboros | OHA | 52 | 2 | 7 | 9 | 34 | 13 | 1 | 2 | 3 | 18 |
| 1957–58 | Toronto Marlboros | MC | — | — | — | — | — | 5 | 0 | 0 | 0 | 4 |
| 1958–59 | Toronto Marlboros | OHA | 54 | 3 | 17 | 20 | 63 | 5 | 3 | 0 | 3 | 2 |
| 1959–60 | Toronto Marlboros | OHA | 48 | 2 | 17 | 19 | 66 | 4 | 0 | 1 | 1 | 16 |
| 1959–60 | Rochester Americans | AHL | 1 | 0 | 0 | 0 | 0 | — | — | — | — | — |
| 1960–61 | Sudbury Wolves | EPHL | 21 | 1 | 2 | 3 | 20 | — | — | — | — | — |
| 1960–61 | Rochester Americans | AHL | 47 | 1 | 9 | 10 | 37 | — | — | — | — | — |
| 1961–62 | Rochester Americans | AHL | 67 | 5 | 21 | 26 | 58 | 2 | 0 | 1 | 1 | 2 |
| 1962–63 | Springfield Indians | AHL | 69 | 8 | 38 | 46 | 38 | — | — | — | — | — |
| 1963–64 | Springfield Indians | AHL | 72 | 7 | 31 | 38 | 76 | — | — | — | — | — |
| 1964–65 | Springfield Indians | AHL | 71 | 7 | 31 | 38 | 66 | — | — | — | — | — |
| 1965–66 | Springfield Indians | AHL | 68 | 5 | 14 | 19 | 42 | 6 | 0 | 2 | 2 | 6 |
| 1966–67 | Springfield Indians | AHL | 69 | 5 | 29 | 34 | 68 | — | — | — | — | — |
| 1967–68 | Los Angeles Kings | NHL | 74 | 11 | 27 | 38 | 100 | 7 | 2 | 2 | 4 | 4 |
| 1968–69 | Los Angeles Kings | NHL | 75 | 5 | 28 | 33 | 38 | 11 | 1 | 4 | 5 | 8 |
| 1969–70 | Los Angeles Kings | NHL | 40 | 4 | 11 | 15 | 21 | — | — | — | — | — |
| 1969–70 | Chicago Black Hawks | NHL | 21 | 0 | 5 | 5 | 18 | 8 | 1 | 2 | 3 | 8 |
| 1970–71 | Chicago Black Hawks | NHL | 67 | 4 | 21 | 25 | 64 | 18 | 1 | 4 | 5 | 20 |
| 1971–72 | Chicago Black Hawks | NHL | 76 | 7 | 22 | 29 | 58 | 8 | 0 | 3 | 3 | 6 |
| 1972–73 | Chicago Black Hawks | NHL | 72 | 9 | 38 | 47 | 80 | 16 | 1 | 6 | 7 | 10 |
| 1973–74 | Chicago Black Hawks | NHL | 69 | 5 | 31 | 36 | 52 | 11 | 1 | 7 | 8 | 14 |
| 1974–75 | Chicago Black Hawks | NHL | 51 | 4 | 23 | 27 | 20 | 8 | 0 | 3 | 3 | 4 |
| 1975–76 | Chicago Black Hawks | NHL | 59 | 1 | 9 | 10 | 44 | 4 | 0 | 1 | 1 | 2 |
| AHL totals | | | 464 | 38 | 73 | 211 | 385 | 8 | 0 | 3 | 3 | 8 |
| NHL totals | | | 604 | 50 | 215 | 265 | 495 | 91 | 7 | 32 | 39 | 76 |

=== International ===
| Year | Team | Event | GP | G | A | Pts | PIM |
|---|---|---|---|---|---|---|---|
| 1972 | Canada | SS | 7 | 1 | 1 | 2 | 8 |
| Senior totals | | | 7 | 1 | 1 | 2 | 8 |

== Coaching record ==
| Team | Year | Regular season | | | | | | Postseason |
| Team | Year | G | W | L | T | Pts | Division rank | Result |
|---|---|---|---|---|---|---|---|---|
| Chicago Black Hawks | 1976–77 | 46 | 16 | 24 | 6 | 38 | 3rd in Smythe | Lost in preliminary round |
| NHL totals | | 46 | 16 | 24 | 6 | 38 | | 0-2 (.000) |

| Preceded by Billy Reay | Head coach of the Chicago Black Hawks; 1976–1977 | Succeeded by Bob Pulford |
