= 1972–73 Detroit Red Wings season =

National Hockey League team season

1972–73 Detroit Red Wings
- Division: 5th East
- 1972–73 record: 37–29–12
- Home record: 22–12–5
- Road record: 15–17–7
- Goals for: 265
- Goals against: 243

Team information
- General manager: Ned Harkness
- Coach: Johnny Wilson
- Captain: Alex Delvecchio
- Alternate captains: Gary Bergman; Red Berenson
- Arena: Detroit Olympia

Team leaders
- Goals: Mickey Redmond (52)
- Assists: Marcel Dionne (53)
- Points: Mickey Redmond (93)
- Penalty minutes: Larry Johnston (169)
- Wins: Roy Edwards (27)
- Goals against average: Roy Edwards (2.63)

The 1972–73 Detroit Red Wings season was the franchise's 47th season of operation in the National Hockey League, 41st season as the Red Wings. The team placed fifth and missed the playoffs for the third year in a row for the first time since the 1966–67 season and the 1968–69 season.

== Regular season ==
=== Final standings ===
East Division
| | | GP | W | L | T | GF | GA | DIFF | Pts |
|---|---|---|---|---|---|---|---|---|---|
| 1 | Montreal Canadiens | 78 | 52 | 10 | 16 | 329 | 184 | +145 | 120 |
| 2 | Boston Bruins | 78 | 51 | 22 | 5 | 330 | 235 | +95 | 107 |
| 3 | New York Rangers | 78 | 47 | 23 | 8 | 297 | 208 | +89 | 102 |
| 4 | Buffalo Sabres | 78 | 37 | 27 | 14 | 257 | 219 | +38 | 88 |
| 5 | Detroit Red Wings | 78 | 37 | 29 | 12 | 265 | 243 | +22 | 86 |
| 6 | Toronto Maple Leafs | 78 | 27 | 41 | 10 | 247 | 279 | −32 | 64 |
| 7 | Vancouver Canucks | 78 | 22 | 47 | 9 | 233 | 339 | −106 | 53 |
| 8 | New York Islanders | 78 | 12 | 60 | 6 | 170 | 347 | −177 | 30 |

=== Record vs. opponents ===
==== Vs. East Division ====
1972–73 NHL records
| Team | BOS | BUF | DET | MTL | NYI | NYR | TOR | VAN | Total |
|---|---|---|---|---|---|---|---|---|---|
| Boston | — | 4–1–1 | 3–2 | 1–3–1 | 5–1 | 3–3 | 4–1 | 4–1 | 24–12–2 |
| Buffalo | 1–4–1 | — | 1–4 | 1–2–2 | 5–0–1 | 5–1 | 4–1 | 3–2 | 20–14–4 |
| Detroit | 2–3 | 4–1 | — | 2–3–1 | 4–1 | 1–3–1 | 4–2 | 3–0–3 | 20–13–5 |
| Montreal | 3–1–1 | 2–1–2 | 3–2–1 | — | 5–0 | 3–0–2 | 5–0–1 | 6–0 | 27–4–7 |
| N.Y. Islanders | 1–5 | 0–5–1 | 1–4 | 0–5 | — | 0–6 | 1–4 | 1–3–1 | 4–32–2 |
| N.Y. Rangers | 3–3 | 1–5 | 3–1–1 | 0–3–2 | 6–0 | — | 4–1 | 3–2 | 20–15–3 |
| Toronto | 1–4 | 1–4 | 2–4 | 0–5–1 | 4–1 | 1–4 | — | 2–3–1 | 11–25–2 |
| Vancouver | 1–4 | 2–3 | 0–3–3 | 0–6 | 3–1–1 | 2–3 | 3–2–1 | — | 11–22–5 |

==== Vs. West Division ====
1972–73 NHL records
| Team | ATL | CAL | CHI | LAK | MIN | PHI | PIT | STL | Total |
|---|---|---|---|---|---|---|---|---|---|
| Boston | 5–0 | 4–0–1 | 2–3 | 3–2 | 3–1–1 | 4–0–1 | 4–1 | 2–3 | 27–10–3 |
| Buffalo | 2–1–2 | 1–2–2 | 2–3 | 2–1–2 | 3–2 | 2–3 | 3–0–2 | 2–1–2 | 17–13–10 |
| Detroit | 3–2 | 2–2–1 | 2–3 | 2–2–1 | 1–3–1 | 3–1–1 | 2–0–3 | 2–3 | 17–16–7 |
| Montreal | 3–0–2 | 3–0–2 | 2–3 | 4–0–1 | 3–1–1 | 2–2–1 | 5–0 | 3–0–2 | 25–6–9 |
| N.Y. Islanders | 0–4–1 | 4–1 | 0–4–1 | 1–4 | 1–4 | 1–4 | 0–4–1 | 1–3–1 | 8–28–4 |
| N.Y. Rangers | 4–1 | 3–1–1 | 2–2–1 | 3–0–2 | 3–2 | 4–0–1 | 3–2 | 5–0 | 27–8–5 |
| Toronto | 1–2–2 | 3–1–1 | 1–2–2 | 3–2 | 2–2–1 | 1–3–1 | 2–2–1 | 3–2 | 16–16–8 |
| Vancouver | 1–4 | 4–1 | 1–3–1 | 2–3 | 0–3–2 | 0–4–1 | 2–3 | 1–4 | 11–25–4 |

== Schedule and results ==
1972–73 regular season
October

| Game | Result | Date | Score | Opponent | Record |
|---|---|---|---|---|---|
| 1 | W | October 7, 1972 | 5–3 | New York Rangers (1972–73) | 1–0–0 |
| 2 | W | October 11, 1972 | 4–3 | Boston Bruins (1972–73) | 2–0–0 |
| 3 | W | October 14, 1972 | 5–0 | Philadelphia Flyers (1972–73) | 3–0–0 |
| 4 | W | October 15, 1972 | 8–2 | Los Angeles Kings (1972–73) | 4–0–0 |
| 5 | W | October 21, 1972 | 3–1 | @ Toronto Maple Leafs (1972–73) | 5–0–0 |
| 6 | W | October 22, 1972 | 6–2 | Toronto Maple Leafs (1972–73) | 6–0–0 |
| 7 | L | October 26, 1972 | 1–2 | @ Philadelphia Flyers (1972–73) | 6–1–0 |
| 8 | L | October 28, 1972 | 3–8 | @ St. Louis Blues (1972–73) | 6–2–0 |
| 9 | L | October 29, 1972 | 1–2 | Montreal Canadiens (1972–73) | 6–3–0 |

November

| Game | Result | Date | Score | Opponent | Record |
|---|---|---|---|---|---|
| 10 | L | November 1, 1972 | 2–4 | Atlanta Flames (1972–73) | 6–4–0 |
| 11 | W | November 4, 1972 | 4–2 | @ Montreal Canadiens (1972–73) | 7–4–0 |
| 12 | T | November 5, 1972 | 1–1 | Pittsburgh Penguins (1972–73) | 7–4–1 |
| 13 | L | November 9, 1972 | 3–8 | @ Boston Bruins (1972–73) | 7–5–1 |
| 14 | L | November 12, 1972 | 1–5 | @ Chicago Black Hawks (1972–73) | 7–6–1 |
| 15 | T | November 14, 1972 | 3–3 | @ Vancouver Canucks (1972–73) | 7–6–2 |
| 16 | W | November 15, 1972 | 4–0 | @ California Golden Seals (1972–73) | 8–6–2 |
| 17 | L | November 18, 1972 | 3–8 | @ Los Angeles Kings (1972–73) | 8–7–2 |
| 18 | W | November 22, 1972 | 6–2 | Buffalo Sabres (1972–73) | 9–7–2 |
| 19 | W | November 25, 1972 | 6–4 | Philadelphia Flyers (1972–73) | 10–7–2 |
| 20 | L | November 26, 1972 | 4–6 | California Golden Seals (1972–73) | 10–8–2 |
| 21 | L | November 29, 1972 | 3–8 | @ Chicago Black Hawks (1972–73) | 10–9–2 |

December

| Game | Result | Date | Score | Opponent | Record |
|---|---|---|---|---|---|
| 22 | W | December 2, 1972 | 4–1 | @ New York Islanders (1972–73) | 11–9–2 |
| 23 | L | December 3, 1972 | 0–3 | Toronto Maple Leafs (1972–73) | 11–10–2 |
| 24 | L | December 5, 1972 | 1–2 | @ St. Louis Blues (1972–73) | 11–11–2 |
| 25 | L | December 7, 1972 | 1–6 | @ Buffalo Sabres (1972–73) | 11–12–2 |
| 26 | L | December 9, 1972 | 0–7 | @ Minnesota North Stars (1972–73) | 11–13–2 |
| 27 | T | December 10, 1972 | 3–3 | Vancouver Canucks (1972–73) | 11–13–3 |
| 28 | L | December 13, 1972 | 0–2 | Atlanta Flames (1972–73) | 11–14–3 |
| 29 | W | December 16, 1972 | 4–1 | @ Toronto Maple Leafs (1972–73) | 12–14–3 |
| 30 | W | December 17, 1972 | 6–4 | Minnesota North Stars (1972–73) | 13–14–3 |
| 31 | W | December 20, 1972 | 4–1 | Los Angeles Kings (1972–73) | 14–14–3 |
| 32 | L | December 21, 1972 | 1–8 | @ Boston Bruins (1972–73) | 14–15–3 |
| 33 | W | December 23, 1972 | 5–1 | Vancouver Canucks (1972–73) | 15–15–3 |
| 34 | L | December 24, 1972 | 0–5 | @ New York Rangers (1972–73) | 15–16–3 |
| 35 | T | December 26, 1972 | 1–1 | Pittsburgh Penguins (1972–73) | 15–16–4 |
| 36 | T | December 30, 1972 | 2–2 | @ Pittsburgh Penguins (1972–73) | 15–16–5 |
| 37 | T | December 31, 1972 | 4–4 | Minnesota North Stars (1972–73) | 15–16–6 |

January

| Game | Result | Date | Score | Opponent | Record |
|---|---|---|---|---|---|
| 38 | W | January 4, 1973 | 4–2 | Buffalo Sabres (1972–73) | 16–16–6 |
| 39 | W | January 6, 1973 | 4–0 | @ New York Islanders (1972–73) | 17–16–6 |
| 40 | W | January 7, 1973 | 4–0 | New York Islanders (1972–73) | 18–16–6 |
| 41 | W | January 10, 1973 | 2–1 | @ Pittsburgh Penguins (1972–73) | 19–16–6 |
| 42 | W | January 12, 1973 | 7–1 | @ Vancouver Canucks (1972–73) | 20–16–6 |
| 43 | W | January 14, 1973 | 3–2 | Pittsburgh Penguins (1972–73) | 21–16–6 |
| 44 | L | January 17, 1973 | 4–6 | Chicago Black Hawks (1972–73) | 21–17–6 |
| 45 | W | January 20, 1973 | 4–2 | Buffalo Sabres (1972–73) | 22–17–6 |
| 46 | L | January 21, 1973 | 3–5 | Minnesota North Stars (1972–73) | 22–18–6 |
| 47 | T | January 23, 1973 | 4–4 | @ Philadelphia Flyers (1972–73) | 22–18–7 |
| 48 | W | January 25, 1973 | 4–2 | @ Boston Bruins (1972–73) | 23–18–7 |
| 49 | L | January 27, 1973 | 3–6 | New York Rangers (1972–73) | 23–19–7 |
| 50 | W | January 28, 1973 | 4–2 | @ Montreal Canadiens (1972–73) | 24–19–7 |

February

| Game | Result | Date | Score | Opponent | Record |
|---|---|---|---|---|---|
| 51 | W | February 1, 1973 | 6–4 | California Golden Seals (1972–73) | 25–19–7 |
| 52 | W | February 3, 1973 | 1–0 | Atlanta Flames (1972–73) | 26–19–7 |
| 53 | W | February 4, 1973 | 8–2 | Vancouver Canucks (1972–73) | 27–19–7 |
| 54 | W | February 7, 1973 | 5–3 | @ Atlanta Flames (1972–73) | 28–19–7 |
| 55 | L | February 10, 1973 | 1–3 | @ Minnesota North Stars (1972–73) | 28–20–7 |
| 56 | W | February 11, 1973 | 5–2 | @ Buffalo Sabres (1972–73) | 29–20–7 |
| 57 | T | February 14, 1973 | 2–2 | @ Los Angeles Kings (1972–73) | 29–20–8 |
| 58 | T | February 16, 1973 | 2–2 | @ California Golden Seals (1972–73) | 29–20–9 |
| 59 | T | February 17, 1973 | 2–2 | @ Vancouver Canucks (1972–73) | 29–20–10 |
| 60 | T | February 22, 1973 | 3–3 | Montreal Canadiens (1972–73) | 29–20–11 |
| 61 | L | February 24, 1973 | 2–4 | @ New York Islanders (1972–73) | 29–21–11 |
| 62 | W | February 25, 1973 | 5–0 | St. Louis Blues (1972–73) | 30–21–11 |
| 63 | W | February 28, 1973 | 6–5 | Philadelphia Flyers (1972–73) | 31–21–11 |

March

| Game | Result | Date | Score | Opponent | Record |
|---|---|---|---|---|---|
| 64 | L | March 3, 1973 | 3–6 | New York Rangers (1972–73) | 31–22–11 |
| 65 | W | March 4, 1973 | 5–1 | New York Islanders (1972–73) | 32–22–11 |
| 66 | W | March 7, 1973 | 5–2 | @ Atlanta Flames (1972–73) | 33–22–11 |
| 67 | L | March 10, 1973 | 0–2 | @ Montreal Canadiens (1972–73) | 33–23–11 |
| 68 | W | March 11, 1973 | 3–1 | St. Louis Blues (1972–73) | 34–23–11 |
| 69 | L | March 14, 1973 | 3–5 | Montreal Canadiens (1972–73) | 34–24–11 |
| 70 | L | March 16, 1973 | 4–5 | Boston Bruins (1972–73) | 34–25–11 |
| 71 | W | March 18, 1973 | 2–0 | @ Chicago Black Hawks (1972–73) | 35–25–11 |
| 72 | L | March 21, 1973 | 3–6 | @ St. Louis Blues (1972–73) | 35–26–11 |
| 73 | L | March 24, 1973 | 3–5 | @ Los Angeles Kings (1972–73) | 35–27–11 |
| 74 | L | March 25, 1973 | 5–8 | @ California Golden Seals (1972–73) | 35–28–11 |
| 75 | W | March 27, 1973 | 8–1 | @ Toronto Maple Leafs (1972–73) | 36–28–11 |
| 76 | L | March 29, 1973 | 4–6 | Toronto Maple Leafs (1972–73) | 36–29–11 |
| 77 | W | March 31, 1973 | 4–2 | Chicago Black Hawks (1972–73) | 37–29–11 |

April

| Game | Result | Date | Score | Opponent | Record |
|---|---|---|---|---|---|
| 78 | T | April 1, 1973 | 3–3 | @ New York Rangers (1972–73) | 37–29–12 |

Legend: Win (2 points) Loss (0 points) Tie (1 point)

== Player statistics ==
=== Regular season ===
Scoring

| Player | Pos | GP | G | A | Pts | PIM | +/- | PPG | SHG | GWG |
|---|---|---|---|---|---|---|---|---|---|---|
| Mickey Redmond | RW | 76 | 52 | 41 | 93 | 24 | 6 | 15 | 0 | 7 |
| Marcel Dionne | C | 77 | 40 | 50 | 90 | 21 | −4 | 10 | 0 | 6 |
| Alex Delvecchio | C/LW | 77 | 18 | 53 | 71 | 13 | 6 | 8 | 0 | 3 |
| Nick Libett | LW | 78 | 19 | 34 | 53 | 56 | 1 | 4 | 1 | 3 |
| Tim Ecclestone | LW | 78 | 18 | 30 | 48 | 28 | 6 | 3 | 1 | 2 |
| Red Berenson | C | 78 | 13 | 30 | 43 | 8 | −14 | 5 | 0 | 1 |
| Bill Collins | RW | 78 | 21 | 21 | 42 | 44 | −1 | 1 | 1 | 6 |
| Al Karlander | C | 77 | 15 | 22 | 37 | 25 | 2 | 4 | 0 | 4 |
| Guy Charron | C | 75 | 18 | 18 | 36 | 23 | 9 | 0 | 0 | 2 |
| Ron Stackhouse | D | 78 | 5 | 29 | 34 | 82 | 22 | 0 | 0 | 0 |
| Gary Bergman | D | 68 | 3 | 28 | 31 | 71 | 10 | 0 | 0 | 0 |
| Henry Boucha | C | 73 | 14 | 14 | 28 | 82 | −2 | 0 | 1 | 0 |
| Thommie Bergman | D | 75 | 9 | 12 | 21 | 70 | 6 | 1 | 0 | 2 |
| Len Fontaine | RW | 39 | 8 | 10 | 18 | 6 | −2 | 1 | 0 | 0 |
| Garnet Bailey | LW | 13 | 2 | 11 | 13 | 16 | 2 | 0 | 0 | 0 |
| Larry Johnston | D | 73 | 1 | 12 | 13 | 169 | 6 | 0 | 0 | 1 |
| Leon Rochefort | RW | 20 | 2 | 4 | 6 | 2 | 0 | 0 | 0 | 0 |
| Gary Doak | D | 44 | 0 | 5 | 5 | 51 | 5 | 0 | 0 | 0 |
| Bob Cook | RW | 13 | 3 | 1 | 4 | 4 | −11 | 1 | 0 | 0 |
| Brian Lavender | LW | 26 | 2 | 2 | 4 | 14 | 2 | 0 | 0 | 0 |
| Ken Murray | D | 31 | 1 | 1 | 2 | 36 | −1 | 0 | 0 | 0 |
| Bill Hogaboam | C | 4 | 1 | 0 | 1 | 2 | −1 | 0 | 0 | 0 |
| Serge Lajeunesse | D/RW | 28 | 0 | 1 | 1 | 26 | −15 | 0 | 0 | 0 |
| Andy Brown | G | 7 | 0 | 0 | 0 | 2 | 0 | 0 | 0 | 0 |
| Denis DeJordy | G | 24 | 0 | 0 | 0 | 0 | 0 | 0 | 0 | 0 |
| Roy Edwards | G | 52 | 0 | 0 | 0 | 4 | 0 | 0 | 0 | 0 |
| Robbie Ftorek | C/LW | 3 | 0 | 0 | 0 | 0 | 0 | 0 | 0 | 0 |
| Danny Gruen | LW | 2 | 0 | 0 | 0 | 0 | 0 | 0 | 0 | 0 |
| Rick Newell | D | 3 | 0 | 0 | 0 | 0 | −1 | 0 | 0 | 0 |

Goaltending

| Player | MIN | GP | W | L | T | GA | GAA | SO |
|---|---|---|---|---|---|---|---|---|
| Roy Edwards | 3012 | 52 | 27 | 17 | 7 | 132 | 2.63 | 6 |
| Denis DeJordy | 1331 | 24 | 8 | 11 | 3 | 83 | 3.74 | 1 |
| Andy Brown | 337 | 7 | 2 | 1 | 2 | 20 | 3.56 | 0 |
| Team: | 4680 | 78 | 37 | 29 | 12 | 235 | 3.01 | 7 |

Note: GP = Games played; G = Goals; A = Assists; Pts = Points; +/- = Plus-minus PIM = Penalty minutes; PPG = Power-play goals; SHG = Short-handed goals; GWG = Game-winning goals;
MIN = Minutes played; W = Wins; L = Losses; T = Ties; GA = Goals against; GAA = Goals-against average; SO = Shutouts;

== Draft picks ==
Detroit's draft picks at the 1972 NHL amateur draft held at the Queen Elizabeth Hotel in Montreal.

| Round | # | Player | Nationality | College/Junior/Club team (League) |
|---|---|---|---|---|
| 2 | 26 | Pierre Guite | Canada | University of Pennsylvania (ECAC) |
| 3 | 42 | Bob Krieger | United States | University of Denver (WCHA) |
| 4 | 58 | Danny Gruen | Canada | Thunder Bay Vulcans (TBJHL) |
| 5 | 74 | Dennis Johnson | United States | University of North Dakota (WCHA) |
| 6 | 90 | Bill Miller | Canada | Medicine Hat Tigers (WCHL) |
| 7 | 106 | Glen Seperich | Canada | Kitchener Rangers (OMJHL) |
| 8 | 122 | Mike Ford | Canada | Brandon Wheat Kings (WCHL) |
| 9 | 138 | George Kuzmicz | Canada | Cornell University (ECAC) |
| 10 | 150 | Dave Arundel | United States | University of Wisconsin (WCHA) |

== See also ==
- 1972–73 NHL season
