= 1972–73 Boston Bruins season =

NHL team season

1972–73 Boston Bruins
- Division: 2nd East
- 1972–73 record: 51–22–5
- Home record: 27–10–2
- Road record: 24–12–3
- Goals for: 330
- Goals against: 235

Team information
- General manager: Harry Sinden
- Coach: Bep Guidolin
- Captain: Vacant
- Alternate captains: Johnny Bucyk; Phil Esposito; Dallas Smith; Don Awrey
- Arena: Boston Garden

Team leaders
- Goals: Phil Esposito (55)
- Assists: Phil Esposito (75)
- Points: Phil Esposito (130)
- Penalty minutes: Carol Vadnais (127)
- Plus/minus: Bobby Orr (+56)
- Wins: Eddie Johnston (24)
- Goals against average: Jacques Plante (2.00)

The 1972–73 Boston Bruins season was the Bruins' 49th season in the NHL.

== Regular season ==
=== Divisional standings ===
East Division
| | | GP | W | L | T | GF | GA | DIFF | Pts |
|---|---|---|---|---|---|---|---|---|---|
| 1 | Montreal Canadiens | 78 | 52 | 10 | 16 | 329 | 184 | +145 | 120 |
| 2 | Boston Bruins | 78 | 51 | 22 | 5 | 330 | 235 | +95 | 107 |
| 3 | New York Rangers | 78 | 47 | 23 | 8 | 297 | 208 | +89 | 102 |
| 4 | Buffalo Sabres | 78 | 37 | 27 | 14 | 257 | 219 | +38 | 88 |
| 5 | Detroit Red Wings | 78 | 37 | 29 | 12 | 265 | 243 | +22 | 86 |
| 6 | Toronto Maple Leafs | 78 | 27 | 41 | 10 | 247 | 279 | −32 | 64 |
| 7 | Vancouver Canucks | 78 | 22 | 47 | 9 | 233 | 339 | −106 | 53 |
| 8 | New York Islanders | 78 | 12 | 60 | 6 | 170 | 347 | −177 | 30 |

=== Record vs. opponents ===
==== Vs. East Division ====
1972–73 NHL records
| Team | BOS | BUF | DET | MTL | NYI | NYR | TOR | VAN | Total |
|---|---|---|---|---|---|---|---|---|---|
| Boston | — | 4–1–1 | 3–2 | 1–3–1 | 5–1 | 3–3 | 4–1 | 4–1 | 24–12–2 |
| Buffalo | 1–4–1 | — | 1–4 | 1–2–2 | 5–0–1 | 5–1 | 4–1 | 3–2 | 20–14–4 |
| Detroit | 2–3 | 4–1 | — | 2–3–1 | 4–1 | 1–3–1 | 4–2 | 3–0–3 | 20–13–5 |
| Montreal | 3–1–1 | 2–1–2 | 3–2–1 | — | 5–0 | 3–0–2 | 5–0–1 | 6–0 | 27–4–7 |
| N.Y. Islanders | 1–5 | 0–5–1 | 1–4 | 0–5 | — | 0–6 | 1–4 | 1–3–1 | 4–32–2 |
| N.Y. Rangers | 3–3 | 1–5 | 3–1–1 | 0–3–2 | 6–0 | — | 4–1 | 3–2 | 20–15–3 |
| Toronto | 1–4 | 1–4 | 2–4 | 0–5–1 | 4–1 | 1–4 | — | 2–3–1 | 11–25–2 |
| Vancouver | 1–4 | 2–3 | 0–3–3 | 0–6 | 3–1–1 | 2–3 | 3–2–1 | — | 11–22–5 |

==== Vs. West Division ====
1972–73 NHL records
| Team | ATL | CAL | CHI | LAK | MIN | PHI | PIT | STL | Total |
|---|---|---|---|---|---|---|---|---|---|
| Boston | 5–0 | 4–0–1 | 2–3 | 3–2 | 3–1–1 | 4–0–1 | 4–1 | 2–3 | 27–10–3 |
| Buffalo | 2–1–2 | 1–2–2 | 2–3 | 2–1–2 | 3–2 | 2–3 | 3–0–2 | 2–1–2 | 17–13–10 |
| Detroit | 3–2 | 2–2–1 | 2–3 | 2–2–1 | 1–3–1 | 3–1–1 | 2–0–3 | 2–3 | 17–16–7 |
| Montreal | 3–0–2 | 3–0–2 | 2–3 | 4–0–1 | 3–1–1 | 2–2–1 | 5–0 | 3–0–2 | 25–6–9 |
| N.Y. Islanders | 0–4–1 | 4–1 | 0–4–1 | 1–4 | 1–4 | 1–4 | 0–4–1 | 1–3–1 | 8–28–4 |
| N.Y. Rangers | 4–1 | 3–1–1 | 2–2–1 | 3–0–2 | 3–2 | 4–0–1 | 3–2 | 5–0 | 27–8–5 |
| Toronto | 1–2–2 | 3–1–1 | 1–2–2 | 3–2 | 2–2–1 | 1–3–1 | 2–2–1 | 3–2 | 16–16–8 |
| Vancouver | 1–4 | 4–1 | 1–3–1 | 2–3 | 0–3–2 | 0–4–1 | 2–3 | 1–4 | 11–25–4 |

== Schedule and results ==
=== Regular season ===
1972–73 regular season
October

| Game | Result | Date | Score | Opponent | Record |
|---|---|---|---|---|---|
| 1 | L | October 8, 1972 | 2–4 | Los Angeles Kings (1972–73) | 0–1–0 |
| 2 | L | October 11, 1972 | 3–4 | @ Detroit Red Wings (1972–73) | 0–2–0 |
| 3 | W | October 14, 1972 | 7–4 | @ New York Islanders (1972–73) | 1–2–0 |
| 4 | W | October 15, 1972 | 8–4 | Pittsburgh Penguins (1972–73) | 2–2–0 |
| 5 | L | October 18, 1972 | 1–7 | @ New York Rangers (1972–73) | 2–3–0 |
| 6 | W | October 21, 1972 | 4–2 | @ Pittsburgh Penguins (1972–73) | 3–3–0 |
| 7 | L | October 22, 1972 | 4–5 | Vancouver Canucks (1972–73) | 3–4–0 |
| 8 | T | October 25, 1972 | 2–2 | @ Buffalo Sabres (1972–73) | 3–4–1 |
| 9 | L | October 26, 1972 | 3–6 | Chicago Black Hawks (1972–73) | 3–5–1 |
| 10 | W | October 28, 1972 | 3–2 | @ Toronto Maple Leafs (1972–73) | 4–5–1 |
| 11 | W | October 29, 1972 | 9–1 | New York Islanders (1972–73) | 5–5–1 |

November

| Game | Result | Date | Score | Opponent | Record |
|---|---|---|---|---|---|
| 12 | L | November 2, 1972 | 2–5 | @ Los Angeles Kings (1972–73) | 5–6–1 |
| 13 | T | November 3, 1972 | 6–6 | @ California Golden Seals (1972–73) | 5–6–2 |
| 14 | W | November 5, 1972 | 4–2 | @ Vancouver Canucks (1972–73) | 6–6–2 |
| 15 | W | November 9, 1972 | 8–3 | Detroit Red Wings (1972–73) | 7–6–2 |
| 16 | L | November 12, 1972 | 3–5 | Montreal Canadiens (1972–73) | 7–7–2 |
| 17 | W | November 16, 1972 | 4–0 | St. Louis Blues (1972–73) | 8–7–2 |
| 18 | W | November 18, 1972 | 7–3 | @ New York Islanders (1972–73) | 9–7–2 |
| 19 | W | November 19, 1972 | 6–5 | Toronto Maple Leafs (1972–73) | 10–7–2 |
| 20 | W | November 23, 1972 | 4–2 | California Golden Seals (1972–73) | 11–7–2 |
| 21 | W | November 24, 1972 | 4–0 | @ Atlanta Flames (1972–73) | 12–7–2 |
| 22 | W | November 26, 1972 | 6–4 | Philadelphia Flyers (1972–73) | 13–7–2 |
| 23 | T | November 29, 1972 | 3–3 | @ Montreal Canadiens (1972–73) | 13–7–3 |
| 24 | W | November 30, 1972 | 5–4 | Buffalo Sabres (1972–73) | 14–7–3 |

December

| Game | Result | Date | Score | Opponent | Record |
|---|---|---|---|---|---|
| 25 | W | December 3, 1972 | 5–1 | New York Islanders (1972–73) | 15–7–3 |
| 26 | W | December 7, 1972 | 5–0 | St. Louis Blues (1972–73) | 16–7–3 |
| 27 | W | December 9, 1972 | 4–3 | @ Philadelphia Flyers (1972–73) | 17–7–3 |
| 28 | W | December 10, 1972 | 8–4 | California Golden Seals (1972–73) | 18–7–3 |
| 29 | L | December 13, 1972 | 3–7 | @ Buffalo Sabres (1972–73) | 18–8–3 |
| 30 | W | December 14, 1972 | 4–2 | New York Rangers (1972–73) | 19–8–3 |
| 31 | W | December 17, 1972 | 5–3 | @ Philadelphia Flyers (1972–73) | 20–8–3 |
| 32 | W | December 19, 1972 | 3–2 | @ Pittsburgh Penguins (1972–73) | 21–8–3 |
| 33 | W | December 21, 1972 | 8–1 | Detroit Red Wings (1972–73) | 22–8–3 |
| 34 | W | December 23, 1972 | 3–1 | Atlanta Flames (1972–73) | 23–8–3 |
| 35 | W | December 27, 1972 | 3–1 | @ Atlanta Flames (1972–73) | 24–8–3 |
| 36 | W | December 29, 1972 | 2–0 | @ Minnesota North Stars (1972–73) | 25–8–3 |

January

| Game | Result | Date | Score | Opponent | Record |
|---|---|---|---|---|---|
| 37 | W | January 1, 1973 | 8–2 | @ Vancouver Canucks (1972–73) | 26–8–3 |
| 38 | L | January 4, 1973 | 2–4 | @ St. Louis Blues (1972–73) | 26–9–3 |
| 39 | L | January 7, 1973 | 4–5 | @ Chicago Black Hawks (1972–73) | 26–10–3 |
| 40 | T | January 11, 1973 | 1–1 | Minnesota North Stars (1972–73) | 26–10–4 |
| 41 | W | January 13, 1973 | 4–1 | @ Toronto Maple Leafs (1972–73) | 27–10–4 |
| 42 | W | January 14, 1973 | 6–0 | Buffalo Sabres (1972–73) | 28–10–4 |
| 43 | L | January 18, 1973 | 7–9 | New York Islanders (1972–73) | 28–11–4 |
| 44 | L | January 20, 1973 | 0–3 | @ Pittsburgh Penguins (1972–73) | 28–12–4 |
| 45 | W | January 21, 1973 | 5–2 | California Golden Seals (1972–73) | 29–12–4 |
| 46 | L | January 24, 1973 | 2–4 | @ New York Rangers (1972–73) | 29–13–4 |
| 47 | L | January 25, 1973 | 2–4 | Detroit Red Wings (1972–73) | 29–14–4 |
| 48 | L | January 27, 1973 | 2–4 | Chicago Black Hawks (1972–73) | 29–15–4 |
| 49 | W | January 28, 1973 | 6–5 | Los Angeles Kings (1972–73) | 30–15–4 |

February

| Game | Result | Date | Score | Opponent | Record |
|---|---|---|---|---|---|
| 50 | W | February 1, 1973 | 5–2 | Toronto Maple Leafs (1972–73) | 31–15–4 |
| 51 | L | February 3, 1973 | 3–7 | New York Rangers (1972–73) | 31–16–4 |
| 52 | T | February 4, 1973 | 2–2 | Philadelphia Flyers (1972–73) | 31–16–5 |
| 53 | W | February 7, 1973 | 3–2 | @ Minnesota North Stars (1972–73) | 32–16–5 |
| 54 | W | February 10, 1973 | 6–3 | Pittsburgh Penguins (1972–73) | 33–16–5 |
| 55 | W | February 11, 1973 | 2–0 | Los Angeles Kings (1972–73) | 34–16–5 |
| 56 | W | February 13, 1973 | 7–3 | Vancouver Canucks (1972–73) | 35–16–5 |
| 57 | W | February 15, 1973 | 3–1 | @ Philadelphia Flyers (1972–73) | 36–16–5 |
| 58 | L | February 17, 1973 | 2–5 | @ Minnesota North Stars (1972–73) | 36–17–5 |
| 59 | W | February 18, 1973 | 4–1 | @ Chicago Black Hawks (1972–73) | 37–17–5 |
| 60 | W | February 20, 1973 | 7–6 | @ Vancouver Canucks (1972–73) | 38–17–5 |
| 61 | W | February 21, 1973 | 6–2 | @ California Golden Seals (1972–73) | 39–17–5 |
| 62 | W | February 24, 1973 | 7–5 | @ Los Angeles Kings (1972–73) | 40–17–5 |

March

| Game | Result | Date | Score | Opponent | Record |
|---|---|---|---|---|---|
| 63 | L | March 1, 1973 | 3–4 | St. Louis Blues (1972–73) | 40–18–5 |
| 64 | L | March 3, 1973 | 1–5 | @ Montreal Canadiens (1972–73) | 40–19–5 |
| 65 | W | March 4, 1973 | 4–0 | Chicago Black Hawks (1972–73) | 41–19–5 |
| 66 | L | March 7, 1973 | 2–5 | @ St. Louis Blues (1972–73) | 41–20–5 |
| 67 | W | March 9, 1973 | 3–2 | @ Atlanta Flames (1972–73) | 42–20–5 |
| 68 | W | March 11, 1973 | 5–3 | Montreal Canadiens (1972–73) | 43–20–5 |
| 69 | W | March 13, 1973 | 3–0 | @ New York Islanders (1972–73) | 44–20–5 |
| 70 | W | March 15, 1973 | 4–1 | @ Buffalo Sabres (1972–73) | 45–20–5 |
| 71 | W | March 16, 1973 | 5–4 | @ Detroit Red Wings (1972–73) | 46–20–5 |
| 72 | W | March 18, 1973 | 7–1 | Atlanta Flames (1972–73) | 47–20–5 |
| 73 | W | March 22, 1973 | 5–3 | Minnesota North Stars (1972–73) | 48–20–5 |
| 74 | W | March 24, 1973 | 3–0 | New York Rangers (1972–73) | 49–20–5 |
| 75 | W | March 25, 1973 | 6–1 | Buffalo Sabres (1972–73) | 50–20–5 |
| 76 | W | March 28, 1973 | 6–3 | @ New York Rangers (1972–73) | 51–20–5 |
| 77 | L | March 31, 1973 | 3–7 | @ Toronto Maple Leafs (1972–73) | 51–21–5 |

April

| Game | Result | Date | Score | Opponent | Record |
|---|---|---|---|---|---|
| 78 | L | April 1, 1973 | 3–5 | Montreal Canadiens (1972–73) | 51–22–5 |

Legend: Win (2 points) Loss (0 points) Tie (1 point)

=== Playoffs ===
==== Quarterfinals: (E2) Boston Bruins vs. (E3) New York Rangers ====
| April 4 | New York Rangers | 6–2 | Boston Bruins | Boston Garden |

| April 5 | New York Rangers | 4–2 | Boston Bruins | Boston Garden |

| April 7 | Boston Bruins | 4–2 | New York Rangers | Madison Square Garden |

| April 8 | Boston Bruins | 0–4 | New York Rangers | Madison Square Garden |

| April 10 | New York Rangers | 6–3 | Boston Bruins | Boston Garden |

| New York won series 4–1 |

== Player statistics ==
=== Regular season ===
| = Indicates league leader |

Scoring

| Player | Pos | GP | G | A | Pts | PIM | +/- | PPG | SHG | GWG |
|---|---|---|---|---|---|---|---|---|---|---|
| Phil Esposito | C | 78 | 55 | 75 | 130 | 87 | 16 | 19 | 5 | 11 |
| Bobby Orr | D | 63 | 29 | 72 | 101 | 99 | 56 | 7 | 1 | 3 |
| John Bucyk | LW | 78 | 40 | 53 | 93 | 12 | 18 | 10 | 0 | 10 |
| Ken Hodge | RW | 73 | 37 | 44 | 81 | 58 | 10 | 16 | 0 | 5 |
| Fred Stanfield | LW | 78 | 20 | 58 | 78 | 10 | 12 | 7 | 0 | 2 |
| Wayne Cashman | LW | 76 | 29 | 39 | 68 | 100 | 5 | 6 | 0 | 3 |
| Don Marcotte | LW | 78 | 24 | 31 | 55 | 49 | 32 | 1 | 2 | 3 |
| Gregg Sheppard | C | 64 | 24 | 26 | 50 | 18 | 37 | 0 | 2 | 3 |
| Mike Walton | C | 56 | 25 | 22 | 47 | 37 | 10 | 0 | 0 | 2 |
| Carol Vadnais | D | 78 | 7 | 24 | 31 | 127 | 21 | 1 | 0 | 3 |
| Dallas Smith | D | 78 | 4 | 27 | 31 | 72 | 38 | 0 | 0 | 0 |
| Terry O'Reilly | RW | 72 | 5 | 22 | 27 | 109 | 27 | 0 | 0 | 1 |
| Garnet Bailey | LW | 57 | 8 | 13 | 21 | 89 | 7 | 0 | 3 | 1 |
| Don Awrey | D | 78 | 2 | 17 | 19 | 90 | 29 | 0 | 0 | 0 |
| Derek Sanderson | C | 25 | 5 | 10 | 15 | 38 | 11 | 0 | 2 | 0 |
| Fred O'Donnell | RW | 72 | 10 | 4 | 14 | 55 | 3 | 0 | 0 | 2 |
| Doug Roberts | RW | 45 | 4 | 7 | 11 | 7 | 13 | 0 | 0 | 2 |
| Nick Beverley | D | 76 | 1 | 10 | 11 | 26 | 7 | 0 | 0 | 0 |
| Rich LeDuc | C | 5 | 1 | 1 | 2 | 2 | −1 | 0 | 0 | 0 |
| Jacques Plante | G | 8 | 0 | 2 | 2 | 2 | 0 | 0 | 0 | 0 |
| Ross Brooks | G | 16 | 0 | 1 | 1 | 0 | 0 | 0 | 0 | 0 |
| Eddie Johnston | G | 45 | 0 | 1 | 1 | 2 | 0 | 0 | 0 | 0 |
| Matt Ravlich | D | 5 | 0 | 1 | 1 | 0 | −5 | 0 | 0 | 0 |
| John Adams | G | 14 | 0 | 0 | 0 | 0 | 0 | 0 | 0 | 0 |
| Gary Doak | D | 5 | 0 | 0 | 0 | 2 | −1 | 0 | 0 | 0 |
| Ron Jones | D | 7 | 0 | 0 | 0 | 0 | 1 | 0 | 0 | 0 |
| Chris Oddleifson | C | 6 | 0 | 0 | 0 | 0 | −1 | 0 | 0 | 0 |

Goaltending

| Player | MIN | GP | W | L | T | GA | GAA | SO |
|---|---|---|---|---|---|---|---|---|
| Eddie Johnston | 2510 | 45 | 24 | 17 | 1 | 137 | 3.27 | 5 |
| Ross Brooks | 910 | 16 | 11 | 1 | 3 | 40 | 2.64 | 1 |
| John Adams | 780 | 14 | 9 | 3 | 1 | 39 | 3.00 | 1 |
| Jacques Plante | 480 | 8 | 7 | 1 | 0 | 16 | 2.00 | 2 |
| Team: | 4680 | 78 | 51 | 22 | 5 | 232 | 2.97 | 9 |

=== Playoffs ===
Scoring

| Player | Pos | GP | G | A | Pts | PIM | PPG | SHG | GWG |
|---|---|---|---|---|---|---|---|---|---|
| Gregg Sheppard | C | 5 | 2 | 1 | 3 | 0 | 0 | 1 | 1 |
| Derek Sanderson | C | 5 | 1 | 2 | 3 | 13 | 0 | 0 | 0 |
| John Bucyk | LW | 5 | 0 | 3 | 3 | 0 | 0 | 0 | 0 |
| Doug Roberts | RW | 5 | 2 | 0 | 2 | 6 | 0 | 0 | 0 |
| Wayne Cashman | LW | 5 | 1 | 1 | 2 | 4 | 0 | 0 | 0 |
| Don Marcotte | LW | 5 | 1 | 1 | 2 | 0 | 0 | 0 | 0 |
| Bobby Orr | D | 5 | 1 | 1 | 2 | 7 | 0 | 0 | 0 |
| Fred Stanfield | LW | 5 | 1 | 1 | 2 | 0 | 0 | 0 | 0 |
| Mike Walton | C | 5 | 1 | 1 | 2 | 2 | 0 | 0 | 0 |
| Dallas Smith | D | 5 | 0 | 2 | 2 | 2 | 0 | 0 | 0 |
| Ken Hodge | RW | 5 | 1 | 0 | 1 | 7 | 1 | 0 | 0 |
| Phil Esposito | C | 2 | 0 | 1 | 1 | 2 | 0 | 0 | 0 |
| Fred O'Donnell | RW | 5 | 0 | 1 | 1 | 5 | 0 | 0 | 0 |
| Don Awrey | D | 4 | 0 | 0 | 0 | 6 | 0 | 0 | 0 |
| Nick Beverley | D | 4 | 0 | 0 | 0 | 0 | 0 | 0 | 0 |
| Ross Brooks | G | 1 | 0 | 0 | 0 | 0 | 0 | 0 | 0 |
| Gary Doak | D | 2 | 0 | 0 | 0 | 2 | 0 | 0 | 0 |
| Eddie Johnston | G | 3 | 0 | 0 | 0 | 0 | 0 | 0 | 0 |
| Terry O'Reilly | RW | 5 | 0 | 0 | 0 | 2 | 0 | 0 | 0 |
| Jacques Plante | G | 2 | 0 | 0 | 0 | 0 | 0 | 0 | 0 |
| Carol Vadnais | D | 5 | 0 | 0 | 0 | 8 | 0 | 0 | 0 |

Goaltending

| Player | MIN | GP | W | L | GA | GAA | SO |
|---|---|---|---|---|---|---|---|
| Eddie Johnston | 160 | 3 | 1 | 2 | 9 | 3.38 | 0 |
| Ross Brooks | 20 | 1 | 0 | 0 | 3 | 9.00 | 0 |
| Jacques Plante | 120 | 2 | 0 | 2 | 10 | 5.00 | 0 |
| Team: | 300 | 5 | 1 | 4 | 22 | 4.40 | 0 |

Note:

Pos = Position;GP = Games played; G = Goals; A = Assists; Pts = Points; PIM = Penalty minutes; +/- = Plus/minus; PPG = Power-play goals; SHG = Short-handed goals; GWG = Game-winning goals
Pos = Position;GP = Games played; Min, TOI = Minutes played; W = Wins; L = Losses; T,T/OT = Ties; OTL = Overtime losses; GA = Goals-against; GAA = Goals-against average; SO = Shutouts; SA = Shots against; SV = Shots saved;SV% = Save percentage;

== Awards and records ==
- Phil Esposito, Runner up, Hart Trophy

== Draft picks ==
| Round | # | Player | Position | Nationality | College/Junior/Club team (League) |
|---|---|---|---|---|---|
| 1 | 16 | Mike Bloom | Left wing | Canada | St. Catharines Black Hawks (OMJHL) |
| 2 | 32 | Wayne Elder | Defense | Canada | London Knights (OMJHL) |
| 3 | 48 | Michel Boudreau | Center | Canada | Laval National (QMJHL) |
| 4 | 64 | Les Jackson | Left wing | Canada | New Westminster Bruins (WCHL) |
| 5 | 80 | Brian Coates | Left wing | Canada | Brandon Wheat Kings (WCHL) |
| 6 | 96 | Peter Gaw | Right wing | Canada | Ottawa 67's (OMJHL) |
| 7 | 112 | Gordie Clark | Right wing | Canada | University of New Hampshire (ECAC) |
| 8 | 128 | Roy Carmichael | Defense | Canada | New Westminster Bruins (WCHL) |

== See also ==
- 1972–73 NHL season
