= 1972–73 St. Louis Blues season =

National Hockey League team season

1972–73 St. Louis Blues
- Division: 4th West
- 1972–73 record: 32–34–12
- Home record: 21–11–7
- Road record: 11–23–5
- Goals for: 233
- Goals against: 251

Team information
- General manager: Charles Catto
- Coach: Al Arbour (2–6–5); Jean-Guy Talbot (30–28–7)
- Captain: Barclay Plager
- Alternate captains: Garry Unger; Bob Plager; Gary Sabourin
- Arena: St. Louis Arena

Team leaders
- Goals: Garry Unger (41)
- Assists: Garry Unger (39)
- Points: Garry Unger (80)
- Penalty minutes: Steve Durbano (231)
- Wins: Wayne Stephenson (18)
- Goals against average: Bob Johnson (2.68)

The 1972–73 St. Louis Blues season was the St. Louis Blues' sixth season in the National Hockey League (NHL).

== Offseason ==
=== NHL draft ===
Round	Pick	Player	Position	Nationality	School/Club team
1	9	Wayne Merrick	Center	Canada	Ottawa 67's (OMJHL)
3	41	Jean Hamel	Defense	Canada	Drummondville Rangers (QMJHL)
4	57	Murray Myers	Right wing	Canada	Saskatoon Blades (WCHL)
5	73	Dave Johnson	Left wing	Canada	Cornwall Royals (QMJHL)
6	89	Tom Simpson	Right wing	Canada	Oshawa Generals (OMJHL)
7	105	Brian Coughlin	Defense	Canada	Verdun Maple Leafs (QMJHL)
8	121	Gary Winchester	Center	Canada	University of Wisconsin (WCHA)

== Regular season ==
=== Final standings ===
West Division
		GP	W	L	T	GF	GA	DIFF	Pts
1	Chicago Black Hawks	78	42	27	9	284	225	+59	93
2	Philadelphia Flyers	78	37	30	11	296	256	+40	85
3	Minnesota North Stars	78	37	30	11	254	230	+24	85
4	St. Louis Blues	78	32	34	12	233	251	−18	76
5	Pittsburgh Penguins	78	32	37	9	257	265	−8	73
6	Los Angeles Kings	78	31	36	11	232	245	−13	73
7	Atlanta Flames	78	25	38	15	191	239	−48	65
8	California Golden Seals	78	16	46	16	213	323	−110	48

=== Record vs. opponents ===
==== Vs. West Division ====
1972–73 NHL records
Team	ATL	CAL	CHI	LAK	MIN	PHI	PIT	STL	Total
Atlanta	—	3–1–1	2–4	1–1–3	3–3	1–3–1	1–4	0–3–3	11–19–8
California	1–3–1	—	0–3–2	2–4	1–4	1–3–2	2–2–2	1–3–1	8–22–8
Chicago	4–2	3–0–2	—	2–3	3–2–1	2–2–1	2–3	3–3	19–15–4
Los Angeles	1–1–3	4–2	3–2	—	0–3–2	4–2	2–4	3–2	17–16–5
Minnesota	3–3	4–1	2–3–1	3–0–2	—	2–3	3–2	2–2–2	19–14–5
Philadelphia	3–1–1	3–1–2	2–2–1	2–4	3–2	—	4–2	3–1–1	20–13–5
Pittsburgh	4–1	2–2–2	3–2	4–2	2–3	2–4	—	3–2	20–16–2
St. Louis	3–0–3	3–1–1	3–3	2–3	2–2–2	1–3–1	2–3	—	16–15–7

==== Vs. East Division ====
1972–73 NHL records
Team	BOS	BUF	DET	MTL	NYI	NYR	TOR	VAN	Total
Atlanta	0–5	1–2–2	2–3	0–3–2	4–0–1	1–4	2–1–2	4–1	14–19–7
California	0–4–1	2–1–2	2–2–1	0–3–2	1–4	1–3–1	1–3–1	1–4	8–24–8
Chicago	3–2	3–2	3–2	3–2	4–0–1	2–2–1	2–1–2	3–1–1	23–12–5
Los Angeles	2–3	1–2–2	2–2–1	0–4–1	4–1	0–3–2	2–3	3–2	14–20–6
Minnesota	1–3–1	2–3	3–1–1	1–3–1	4–1	2–3	2–2–1	3–0–2	18–16–6
Philadelphia	0–4–1	3–2	1–3–1	2–2–1	4–1	0–4–1	3–1–1	4–0–1	17–17–6
Pittsburgh	1–4	0–3–2	0–2–3	0–5	4–0–1	2–3	2–2–1	3–2	12–21–7
St. Louis	3–2	1–2–2	3–2	0–3–2	3–1–1	0–5	2–3	4–1	16–19–5

== Schedule and results ==
1972–73 regular season
October

Game	Result	Date	Score	Opponent	Record
1	T	October 7, 1972	4–4	Philadelphia Flyers (1972–73)	0–0–1
2	L	October 11, 1972	2–5	Pittsburgh Penguins (1972–73)	0–1–1
3	L	October 14, 1972	2–4	Chicago Black Hawks (1972–73)	0–2–1
4	W	October 15, 1972	3–1	@ Chicago Black Hawks (1972–73)	1–2–1
5	T	October 18, 1972	4–4	Montreal Canadiens (1972–73)	1–2–2
6	T	October 21, 1972	1–1	Buffalo Sabres (1972–73)	1–2–3
7	L	October 24, 1972	1–2	Minnesota North Stars (1972–73)	1–3–3
8	L	October 26, 1972	0–7	@ Montreal Canadiens (1972–73)	1–4–3
9	W	October 28, 1972	8–3	Detroit Red Wings (1972–73)	2–4–3

November

Game	Result	Date	Score	Opponent	Record
10	T	November 1, 1972	3–3	@ Minnesota North Stars (1972–73)	2–4–4
11	L	November 4, 1972	2–4	@ Toronto Maple Leafs (1972–73)	2–5–4
12	T	November 5, 1972	1–1	@ Buffalo Sabres (1972–73)	2–5–5
13	L	November 7, 1972	2–3	Los Angeles Kings (1972–73)	2–6–5
14	W	November 11, 1972	1–0	Toronto Maple Leafs (1972–73)	3–6–5
15	L	November 16, 1972	0–4	@ Boston Bruins (1972–73)	3–7–5
16	L	November 18, 1972	1–3	New York Rangers (1972–73)	3–8–5
17	W	November 21, 1972	4–2	Vancouver Canucks (1972–73)	4–8–5
18	L	November 22, 1972	4–10	@ Pittsburgh Penguins (1972–73)	4–9–5
19	L	November 25, 1972	2–4	Chicago Black Hawks (1972–73)	4–10–5
20	W	November 28, 1972	4–2	Toronto Maple Leafs (1972–73)	5–10–5
21	W	November 29, 1972	2–1	@ California Golden Seals (1972–73)	6–10–5

December

Game	Result	Date	Score	Opponent	Record
22	W	December 1, 1972	6–2	@ Vancouver Canucks (1972–73)	7–10–5
23	L	December 2, 1972	2–3	@ Los Angeles Kings (1972–73)	7–11–5
24	W	December 5, 1972	2–1	Detroit Red Wings (1972–73)	8–11–5
25	L	December 7, 1972	0–5	@ Boston Bruins (1972–73)	8–12–5
26	W	December 9, 1972	2–1	Atlanta Flames (1972–73)	9–12–5
27	W	December 10, 1972	5–4	@ Atlanta Flames (1972–73)	10–12–5
28	T	December 12, 1972	4–4	@ New York Islanders (1972–73)	10–12–6
29	L	December 14, 1972	3–5	@ Philadelphia Flyers (1972–73)	10–13–6
30	L	December 16, 1972	3–4	Buffalo Sabres (1972–73)	10–14–6
31	L	December 20, 1972	4–5	New York Rangers (1972–73)	10–15–6
32	W	December 23, 1972	6–1	Philadelphia Flyers (1972–73)	11–15–6
33	L	December 26, 1972	1–4	Montreal Canadiens (1972–73)	11–16–6
34	W	December 27, 1972	5–3	@ Chicago Black Hawks (1972–73)	12–16–6
35	L	December 30, 1972	4–5	@ Toronto Maple Leafs (1972–73)	12–17–6
36	L	December 31, 1972	1–6	@ New York Rangers (1972–73)	12–18–6

January

Game	Result	Date	Score	Opponent	Record
37	W	January 2, 1973	5–4	Pittsburgh Penguins (1972–73)	13–18–6
38	W	January 4, 1973	4–2	Boston Bruins (1972–73)	14–18–6
39	T	January 6, 1973	2–2	Atlanta Flames (1972–73)	14–18–7
40	L	January 9, 1973	0–3	@ Vancouver Canucks (1972–73)	14–19–7
41	L	January 10, 1973	5–6	@ California Golden Seals (1972–73)	14–20–7
42	L	January 13, 1973	3–5	New York Rangers (1972–73)	14–21–7
43	W	January 14, 1973	2–1	@ New York Islanders (1972–73)	15–21–7
44	T	January 17, 1973	3–3	Atlanta Flames (1972–73)	15–21–8
45	W	January 19, 1973	2–1	@ Atlanta Flames (1972–73)	16–21–8
46	W	January 20, 1973	5–1	New York Islanders (1972–73)	17–21–8
47	W	January 24, 1973	7–5	@ Los Angeles Kings (1972–73)	18–21–8
48	T	January 26, 1973	1–1	@ California Golden Seals (1972–73)	18–21–9
49	W	January 27, 1973	3–1	@ Vancouver Canucks (1972–73)	19–21–9

February

Game	Result	Date	Score	Opponent	Record
50	T	February 1, 1973	3–3	Montreal Canadiens (1972–73)	19–21–10
51	W	February 3, 1973	6–1	California Golden Seals (1972–73)	20–21–10
52	L	February 4, 1973	2–5	@ Chicago Black Hawks (1972–73)	20–22–10
53	W	February 6, 1973	5–1	Vancouver Canucks (1972–73)	21–22–10
54	W	February 8, 1973	3–2	Minnesota North Stars (1972–73)	22–22–10
55	W	February 10, 1973	5–2	California Golden Seals (1972–73)	23–22–10
56	W	February 13, 1973	4–2	Los Angeles Kings (1972–73)	24–22–10
57	L	February 14, 1973	2–5	@ Minnesota North Stars (1972–73)	24–23–10
58	W	February 17, 1973	4–3	Chicago Black Hawks (1972–73)	25–23–10
59	L	February 20, 1973	3–5	Philadelphia Flyers (1972–73)	25–24–10
60	W	February 21, 1973	5–2	@ Minnesota North Stars (1972–73)	26–24–10
61	L	February 24, 1973	2–4	@ Toronto Maple Leafs (1972–73)	26–25–10
62	L	February 25, 1973	0–5	@ Detroit Red Wings (1972–73)	26–26–10
63	L	February 28, 1973	2–4	@ Pittsburgh Penguins (1972–73)	26–27–10

March

Game	Result	Date	Score	Opponent	Record
64	W	March 1, 1973	4–3	@ Boston Bruins (1972–73)	27–27–10
65	L	March 3, 1973	0–2	@ Los Angeles Kings (1972–73)	27–28–10
66	W	March 7, 1973	5–2	Boston Bruins (1972–73)	28–28–10
67	W	March 10, 1973	5–4	New York Islanders (1972–73)	29–28–10
68	L	March 11, 1973	1–3	@ Detroit Red Wings (1972–73)	29–29–10
69	W	March 13, 1973	2–0	Buffalo Sabres (1972–73)	30–29–10
70	T	March 14, 1973	1–1	@ Atlanta Flames (1972–73)	30–29–11
71	L	March 17, 1973	4–6	@ New York Islanders (1972–73)	30–30–11
72	L	March 18, 1973	1–3	@ New York Rangers (1972–73)	30–31–11
73	W	March 21, 1973	6–3	Detroit Red Wings (1972–73)	31–31–11
74	L	March 24, 1973	4–11	@ Montreal Canadiens (1972–73)	31–32–11
75	L	March 25, 1973	2–5	@ Philadelphia Flyers (1972–73)	31–33–11
76	T	March 28, 1973	3–3	Minnesota North Stars (1972–73)	31–33–12
77	W	March 31, 1973	7–2	Pittsburgh Penguins (1972–73)	32–33–12

April

Game	Result	Date	Score	Opponent	Record
78	L	April 1, 1973	1–3	@ Buffalo Sabres (1972–73)	32–34–12

Legend: Win (2 points) Loss (0 points) Tie (1 point)

== Playoffs ==
Despite having a 32–34–12 record, the Blues managed to clinch a playoff spot. However, they lost in the first round to the Chicago Blackhawks 4–1.

=== (W1) Chicago Black Hawks vs. (W4) St. Louis Blues ===
April 4	St. Louis Blues	1–7	Chicago Black Hawks	Chicago Stadium

April 5	St. Louis Blues	0–1	Chicago Black Hawks	Chicago Stadium

April 7	Chicago Black Hawks	5–2	St. Louis Blues	St. Louis Arena

April 8	Chicago Black Hawks	3–5	St. Louis Blues	St. Louis Arena

April 10	St. Louis Blues	1–6	Chicago Black Hawks	Chicago Stadium

Chicago won series 4–1

== Player statistics ==
=== Regular season ===
Scoring

Player	Pos	GP	G	A	Pts	PIM	+/-	PPG	SHG	GWG
Garry Unger	C	78	41	39	80	119	7	13	1	5
Jack Egers	RW	78	24	24	48	26	1	4	0	4
Gary Sabourin	RW	76	21	27	48	30	−5	1	0	2
Mike Murphy	RW	64	18	27	45	48	13	3	0	3
Phil Roberto	RW	77	20	22	42	99	−12	2	0	5
Danny O'Shea	C	75	12	26	38	30	−5	0	2	2
Fran Huck	C	58	16	20	36	20	−1	2	0	2
Floyd Thomson	LW	75	14	20	34	71	−2	1	0	1
Barclay Plager	D	68	8	25	33	102	0	3	0	2
Bob Plager	D	77	2	31	33	107	−1	0	0	1
Pierre Plante	RW	49	12	13	25	56	8	0	0	1
Frank St. Marseille	RW	45	7	18	25	8	−6	3	0	0
Wayne Merrick	C	50	10	11	21	10	−2	3	0	0
Chris Evans	D	77	9	12	21	31	−2	0	2	3
Steve Durbano	D	49	3	18	21	231	−3	0	0	0
Bob McCord	D	43	1	13	14	33	−5	0	0	0
Ab DeMarco Jr.	D	14	4	9	13	2	4	2	1	1
Jean Hamel	D	55	2	7	9	24	−5	0	0	0
Kevin O'Shea	RW	37	3	5	8	31	−13	0	0	0
Andre Dupont	D	25	1	6	7	51	−2	0	0	0
Mike Lampman	LW	18	2	3	5	2	4	0	0	0
Paul Curtis	D	29	1	4	5	6	2	0	0	0
Connie Madigan	D	20	0	3	3	25	1	0	0	0
Brent Hughes	D	8	1	1	2	0	1	0	0	0
Chuck Hamilton	LW	3	0	2	2	2	4	0	0	0
Noel Picard	D	16	1	0	1	10	−2	0	0	0
Jacques Caron	G	30	0	0	0	0	0	0	0	0
Bob Johnson	G	12	0	0	0	17	0	0	0	0
Roger Lafreniere	LW	10	0	0	0	0	−1	0	0	0
Joe Noris	C/D	2	0	0	0	0	−2	0	0	0
Wayne Stephenson	G	45	0	0	0	0	0	0	0	0

Goaltending

Player	MIN	GP	W	L	T	GA	GAA	SO
Wayne Stephenson	2535	45	18	15	7	128	3.03	1
Jacques Caron	1562	30	8	14	5	92	3.53	1
Bob Johnson	583	12	6	5	0	26	2.68	0
Team:	4680	78	32	34	12	246	3.15	2

=== Playoffs ===
Scoring

Player	Pos	GP	G	A	Pts	PIM	PPG	SHG	GWG
Fran Huck	C	5	2	2	4	0	1	0	0
Phil Roberto	RW	5	2	1	3	4	0	0	0
Garry Unger	C	5	1	2	3	2	0	0	0
Pierre Plante	RW	5	2	0	2	15	0	0	0
Ab DeMarco	D	4	1	1	2	2	1	0	0
Gary Sabourin	RW	5	1	1	2	0	0	0	1
Steve Durbano	D	5	0	2	2	8	0	0	0
Bob Plager	D	5	0	2	2	2	0	0	0
Jack Egers	RW	5	0	1	1	2	0	0	0
Chris Evans	D	5	0	1	1	4	0	0	0
Wayne Merrick	C	5	0	1	1	2	0	0	0
Barclay Plager	D	5	0	1	1	0	0	0	0
Floyd Thomson	LW	5	0	1	1	2	0	0	0
Jacques Caron	G	3	0	0	0	0	0	0	0
Paul Curtis	D	5	0	0	0	2	0	0	0
Jean Hamel	D	2	0	0	0	0	0	0	0
Connie Madigan	D	5	0	0	0	4	0	0	0
Danny O'Shea	C	5	0	0	0	2	0	0	0
Kevin O'Shea	RW	1	0	0	0	0	0	0	0
Wayne Stephenson	G	3	0	0	0	0	0	0	0

Goaltending

Player	MIN	GP	W	L	GA	GAA	SO
Wayne Stephenson	160	3	1	2	14	5.25	0
Jacques Caron	140	3	0	2	8	3.43	0
Team:	300	5	1	4	22	4.40	0

Note:

Pos = Position;GP = Games played; G = Goals; A = Assists; Pts = Points; PIM = Penalty minutes; +/- = Plus/minus; PPG = Power-play goals; SHG = Short-handed goals; GWG = Game-winning goals
Pos = Position;GP = Games played; Min, TOI = Minutes played; W = Wins; L = Losses; T,T/OT = Ties; OTL = Overtime losses; GA = Goals-against; GAA = Goals-against average; SO = Shutouts; SA = Shots against; SV = Shots saved;SV% = Save percentage;

== See also ==
- 1972–73 NHL season
