= 1972–73 Philadelphia Flyers season =

NHL hockey team season

1972–73 Philadelphia Flyers
- Division: 2nd West
- 1972–73 record: 37–30–11
- Home record: 27–8–4
- Road record: 10–22–7
- Goals for: 296 (4th)
- Goals against: 256 (11th)

Team information
- General manager: Keith Allen
- Coach: Fred Shero
- Captain: Ed Van Impe (Oct.–Jan.); Bobby Clarke (Jan.–Apr.)
- Alternate captains: Bill Clement; Joe Watson
- Arena: Spectrum
- Average attendance: 16,063
- Minor league affiliates: Richmond Robins; San Diego Gulls; Jersey Devils

Team leaders
- Goals: Rick MacLeish (50)
- Assists: Bobby Clarke (67)
- Points: Bobby Clarke (104)
- Penalty minutes: Dave Schultz (259)
- Plus/minus: Bobby Clarke (+32)
- Wins: Doug Favell (20)
- Goals against average: Doug Favell (2.83)

The 1972–73 Philadelphia Flyers season was the franchise's sixth season in the National Hockey League (NHL). The Flyers earned the nickname "Broad Street Bullies" en route to their first winning season and first playoff series victory, beating the Minnesota North Stars, before losing in the semifinals to the Montreal Canadiens.

== Regular season ==
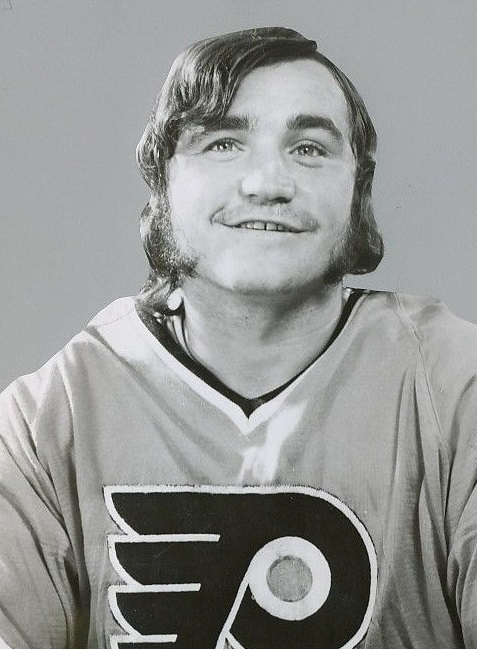
During the 1972–73 season, Rick MacLeish scored the first two 4-goal games in team history and became the first Flyer to score 50 goals in a season.

It was during the 1972–73 season that the Flyers shed the mediocre expansion team label by recording their first winning season and becoming known as the intimidating "Broad Street Bullies", a nickname coined by Jack Chevalier and Pete Cafone of the Philadelphia Bulletin on January 3, 1973 after a 3–1 brawling victory over the Atlanta Flames that led Chevalier to write in his game account, "The image of the fightin' Flyers spreading gradually around the NHL, and people are dreaming up wild nicknames. They're the Mean Machine, the Bullies of Broad Street and Freddy's Philistines." Cafone wrote the accompanying headline, "Broad Street Bullies Muscle Atlanta".

That same month Bobby Clarke was the youngest player (at that time) in NHL history to be named team captain, replacing Ed Van Impe who had stepped aside in favor of Clarke. Rick MacLeish became the first Flyer to score 50 goals in a season.

After the season, Clarke was awarded the Hart Memorial Trophy as the NHL's most valuable player.

=== Season standings ===
West Division
		GP	W	L	T	GF	GA	DIFF	Pts
1	Chicago Black Hawks	78	42	27	9	284	225	+59	93
2	Philadelphia Flyers	78	37	30	11	296	256	+40	85
3	Minnesota North Stars	78	37	30	11	254	230	+24	85
4	St. Louis Blues	78	32	34	12	233	251	−18	76
5	Pittsburgh Penguins	78	32	37	9	257	265	−8	73
6	Los Angeles Kings	78	31	36	11	232	245	−13	73
7	Atlanta Flames	78	25	38	15	191	239	−48	65
8	California Golden Seals	78	16	46	16	213	323	−110	48

=== Record vs. opponents ===
==== Vs. West Division ====
1972–73 NHL records
Team	ATL	CAL	CHI	LAK	MIN	PHI	PIT	STL	Total
Atlanta	—	3–1–1	2–4	1–1–3	3–3	1–3–1	1–4	0–3–3	11–19–8
California	1–3–1	—	0–3–2	2–4	1–4	1–3–2	2–2–2	1–3–1	8–22–8
Chicago	4–2	3–0–2	—	2–3	3–2–1	2–2–1	2–3	3–3	19–15–4
Los Angeles	1–1–3	4–2	3–2	—	0–3–2	4–2	2–4	3–2	17–16–5
Minnesota	3–3	4–1	2–3–1	3–0–2	—	2–3	3–2	2–2–2	19–14–5
Philadelphia	3–1–1	3–1–2	2–2–1	2–4	3–2	—	4–2	3–1–1	20–13–5
Pittsburgh	4–1	2–2–2	3–2	4–2	2–3	2–4	—	3–2	20–16–2
St. Louis	3–0–3	3–1–1	3–3	2–3	2–2–2	1–3–1	2–3	—	16–15–7

==== Vs. East Division ====
1972–73 NHL records
Team	BOS	BUF	DET	MTL	NYI	NYR	TOR	VAN	Total
Atlanta	0–5	1–2–2	2–3	0–3–2	4–0–1	1–4	2–1–2	4–1	14–19–7
California	0–4–1	2–1–2	2–2–1	0–3–2	1–4	1–3–1	1–3–1	1–4	8–24–8
Chicago	3–2	3–2	3–2	3–2	4–0–1	2–2–1	2–1–2	3–1–1	23–12–5
Los Angeles	2–3	1–2–2	2–2–1	0–4–1	4–1	0–3–2	2–3	3–2	14–20–6
Minnesota	1–3–1	2–3	3–1–1	1–3–1	4–1	2–3	2–2–1	3–0–2	18–16–6
Philadelphia	0–4–1	3–2	1–3–1	2–2–1	4–1	0–4–1	3–1–1	4–0–1	17–17–6
Pittsburgh	1–4	0–3–2	0–2–3	0–5	4–0–1	2–3	2–2–1	3–2	12–21–7
St. Louis	3–2	1–2–2	3–2	0–3–2	3–1–1	0–5	2–3	4–1	16–19–5

== Playoffs ==
An overtime goal by Gary Dornhoefer in game five turned the tide of their first round series with the Minnesota North Stars in the Flyers' favor, as the Flyers got their first playoff series win in six games. The goal was later immortalized as a bronze statue on the south side of the Spectrum. They were outmatched in the semi-finals by the Montreal Canadiens, however, losing in five games.

== Schedule and results ==
=== Regular season ===
1972–73 regular season
October: 4–4–2, 10 points (home: 3–1–0; road: 1–3–2)

Game	Date	Score	Opponent	Decision	Record	Points	Recap
1	October 7	4–4	@ St. Louis Blues	Favell	0–0–1	1	T
2	October 12	7–3	Vancouver Canucks	Favell	1–0–1	3	W
3	October 14	0–5	@ Detroit Red Wings	Taylor	1–1–1	3	L
4	October 15	1–4	California Golden Seals	Favell	1–2–1	3	L
5	October 18	4–3	@ Los Angeles Kings	Favell	2–2–1	5	W
6	October 20	3–3	@ California Golden Seals	Taylor	2–2–2	6	T
7	October 25	1–6	@ New York Rangers	Taylor	2–3–2	6	L
8	October 26	2–1	Detroit Red Wings	Favell	3–3–2	8	W
9	October 28	1–2	@ Minnesota North Stars	Favell	3–4–2	8	L
10	October 29	5–2	Toronto Maple Leafs	Taylor	4–4–2	10	W

November: 6–7–1, 13 points (home: 6–1–1; road: 0–6–0)

Game	Date	Score	Opponent	Decision	Record	Points	Recap
11	November 2	4–2	Pittsburgh Penguins	Favell	5–4–2	12	W
12	November 4	5–3	Buffalo Sabres	Taylor	6–4–2	14	W
13	November 5	2–3	New York Rangers	Favell	6–5–2	14	L
14	November 8	2–5	@ Pittsburgh Penguins	Favell	6–6–2	14	L
15	November 9	5–3	Chicago Black Hawks	Favell	7–6–2	16	W
16	November 11	3–1	Buffalo Sabres	Favell	8–6–2	18	W
17	November 12	8–3	California Golden Seals	Favell	9–6–2	20	W
18	November 15	3–7	@ New York Rangers	Belhumeur	9–7–2	20	L
19	November 16	5–6	@ Montreal Canadiens	Favell	9–8–2	20	L
20	November 19	2–3	@ Atlanta Flames	Belhumeur	9–9–2	20	L
21	November 22	5–3	New York Islanders	Favell	10–9–2	22	W
22	November 25	4–6	@ Detroit Red Wings	Favell	10–10–2	22	L
23	November 26	4–6	@ Boston Bruins	Favell	10–11–2	22	L
24	November 30	5–5	Atlanta Flames	Favell	10–11–3	23	T

December: 6–6–3, 15 points (home: 5–2–0; road: 1–4–3)

Game	Date	Score	Opponent	Decision	Record	Points	Recap
25	December 2	2–2	@ Toronto Maple Leafs	Belhumeur	10–11–4	24	T
26	December 3	5–2	Montreal Canadiens	Belhumeur	11–11–4	26	W
27	December 7	6–2	Minnesota North Stars	Belhumeur	12–11–4	28	W
28	December 9	3–4	Boston Bruins	Belhumeur	12–12–4	28	L
29	December 10	5–2	Toronto Maple Leafs	Belhumeur	13–12–4	30	W
30	December 13	2–7	@ Minnesota North Stars	Belhumeur	13–13–4	30	L
31	December 14	5–3	St. Louis Blues	Belhumeur	14–13–4	32	W
32	December 16	2–1	@ New York Islanders	Belhumeur	15–13–4	34	W
33	December 17	3–5	Boston Bruins	Belhumeur	15–14–4	34	L
34	December 20	1–4	@ Chicago Black Hawks	Favell	15–15–4	34	L
35	December 21	6–3	Los Angeles Kings	Belhumeur	16–15–4	36	W
36	December 23	1–6	@ St. Louis Blues	Favell	16–16–4	36	L
37	December 27	2–2	@ California Golden Seals	Belhumeur	16–16–5	37	T
38	December 29	4–4	@ Vancouver Canucks	Belhumeur	16–16–6	38	T
39	December 30	3–5	@ Los Angeles Kings	Taylor	16–17–6	38	L

January: 7–4–1, 15 points (home: 3–2–1; road: 4–2–0)

Game	Date	Score	Opponent	Decision	Record	Points	Recap
40	January 3	3–1	@ Atlanta Flames	Favell	17–17–6	40	W
41	January 7	0–2	@ Buffalo Sabres	Favell	17–18–6	40	L
42	January 11	2–3	Los Angeles Kings	Favell	17–19–6	40	L
43	January 13	3–2	@ Chicago Black Hawks	Belhumeur	18–19–6	42	W
44	January 14	2–5	New York Rangers	Belhumeur	18–20–6	42	L
45	January 18	6–1	Minnesota North Stars	Taylor	19–20–6	44	L
46	January 20	3–6	@ Montreal Canadiens	Taylor	19–21–6	44	L
47	January 21	4–3	@ Buffalo Sabres	Taylor	20–21–6	46	W
48	January 23	4–4	Detroit Red Wings	Taylor	20–21–7	47	T
49	January 25	6–3	Pittsburgh Penguins	Belhumeur	21–21–7	49	W
50	January 27	5–3	@ Pittsburgh Penguins	Belhumeur	22–21–7	51	W
51	January 28	4–3	California Golden Seals	Taylor	23–21–7	53	W

February: 7–4–2, 16 points (home: 3–1–1; road: 4–3–1)

Game	Date	Score	Opponent	Decision	Record	Points	Recap
52	February 1	5–4	Vancouver Canucks	Taylor	24–21–7	55	W
53	February 3	2–2	Chicago Black Hawks	Taylor	24–21–8	56	T
54	February 4	2–2	@ Boston Bruins	Taylor	24–21–9	57	T
55	February 7	1–2	@ Los Angeles Kings	Taylor	24–22–9	57	L
56	February 9	10–5	@ Vancouver Canucks	Taylor	25–22–9	59	W
57	February 11	2–7	@ Chicago Black Hawks	Taylor	25–23–9	59	L
58	February 13	8–2	New York Islanders	Favell	26–23–9	61	W
59	February 15	1–3	Boston Bruins	Favell	26–24–9	61	L
60	February 17	7–6	@ Montreal Canadiens	Taylor	27–24–9	63	W
61	February 18	5–1	Minnesota North Stars	Favell	28–24–9	65	W
62	February 20	5–3	@ St. Louis Blues	Favell	29–24–9	67	W
63	February 25	7–0	@ California Golden Seals	Favell	30–24–9	69	W
64	February 28	5–6	@ Detroit Red Wings	Taylor	30–25–9	69	L

March: 7–4–2, 16 points (home: 7–1–1; road: 0–3–2)

Game	Date	Score	Opponent	Decision	Record	Points	Recap
65	March 1	0–2	Los Angeles Kings	Favell	30–26–9	69	L
66	March 4	10–0	Toronto Maple Leafs	Favell	31–26–9	71	W
67	March 7	2–2	@ New York Rangers	Favell	31–26–10	72	T
68	March 10	2–1	Atlanta Flames	Favell	32–26–10	74	W
69	March 11	3–2	Pittsburgh Penguins	Favell	33–26–10	76	W
70	March 14	1–5	@ Toronto Maple Leafs	Favell	33–27–10	76	L
71	March 18	4–4	Montreal Canadiens	Favell	33–27–11	77	T
72	March 22	9–0	Vancouver Canucks	Favell	34–27–11	79	W
73	March 24	2–3	@ New York Islanders	Belhumeur	34–28–11	79	L
74	March 25	5–2	St. Louis Blues	Favell	35–28–11	81	W
75	March 28	3–6	@ Buffalo Sabres	Favell	35–29–11	81	L
76	March 29	4–2	Atlanta Flames	Favell	36–29–11	83	W
77	March 31	10–2	New York Islanders	Favell	37–29–11	85	W

April: 0–1–0, 0 points (home: 0–0–0; road: 0–1–0)

Game	Date	Score	Opponent	Decision	Record	Points	Recap
78	April 1	4–5	@ Pittsburgh Penguins	Taylor	37–30–11	85	L

Legend: W Win (2 points) L Loss (0 points) T Tie (1 point)

=== Playoffs ===
1973 Stanley Cup playoffs
Quarterfinals vs. Minnesota North Stars – Flyers win 4–2

Game	Date	Score	Opponent	Decision	Series	Recap
1	April 4	0–3	Minnesota North Stars	Favell	North Stars lead 1–0	L
2	April 5	4–1	Minnesota North Stars	Favell	Series tied 1–1	W
3	April 7	0–5	@ Minnesota North Stars	Favell	North Stars lead 2–1	L
4	April 8	3–0	@ Minnesota North Stars	Favell	Series tied 2–2	W
5	April 10	3–2 OT	Minnesota North Stars	Favell	Flyers lead 3–2	W
6	April 12	4–1	@ Minnesota North Stars	Favell	Flyers win 4–2	W

Semifinals vs. Montreal Canadiens – Canadiens win 4–1

Game	Date	Score	Opponent	Decision	Series	Recap
1	April 14	5–4 OT	@ Montreal Canadiens	Favell	Flyers lead 1–0	W
2	April 16	3–4 OT	@ Montreal Canadiens	Favell	Series tied 1–1	L
3	April 19	1–2	Montreal Canadiens	Favell	Canadiens lead 2–1	L
4	April 22	1–4	Montreal Canadiens	Favell	Canadiens lead 3–1	L
5	April 24	3–5	@ Montreal Canadiens	Favell	Canadiens win 4–1	L

Legend: W Win L Loss

== Player statistics ==
=== Scoring ===
- Position abbreviations: C = Center; D = Defense; G = Goaltender; LW = Left wing; RW = Right wing
- † = Joined team via a transaction (e.g., trade, waivers, signing) during the season. Stats reflect time with the Flyers only.
- ‡ = Left team via a transaction (e.g., trade, waivers, release) during the season. Stats reflect time with the Flyers only.

No.	Player	Pos	Regular season						Playoffs					
No.	Player	Pos	GP	G	A	Pts	+/-	PIM	GP	G	A	Pts	+/-	PIM
16	Bobby Clarke	C	78	37	67	104	32	80	11	2	6	8	−1	6
19	Rick MacLeish	C	78	50	50	100	15	69	10	3	4	7	−2	2
12 (Note: Dornhoefer also wore number 24 in a number of road games.)	Gary Dornhoefer	RW	77	30	49	79	17	168	11	3	3	6	0	16
21	Bill Flett	RW	69	43	31	74	31	53	11	3	4	7	−2	0
7	Bill Barber	LW	69	30	34	64	10	46	11	3	2	5	−2	22
18	Ross Lonsberry	LW	77	21	29	50	6	59	11	4	3	7	−1	9
23	Tom Bladon	D	78	11	31	42	9	26	11	0	4	4	−3	2
17 (Note: Nolet also wore number 7 in one game and number 22 in a number of road games.)	Simon Nolet	RW	70	16	20	36	−3	6	11	3	1	4	1	4
10	Bill Clement	C	73	14	14	28	−11	51	2	0	0	0	0	0
14	Joe Watson	D	63	2	24	26	30	46	11	0	2	2	2	12
28	Andre Dupont†	D	46	3	20	23	8	164	11	1	2	3	−4	29
11	Don Saleski	RW	78	12	9	21	−20	205	11	1	2	3	1	4
9	Bob Kelly	LW	77	10	11	21	1	238	11	0	1	1	0	8
8	Dave Schultz	LW	76	9	12	21	4	259	11	1	0	1	−2	51
4	Barry Ashbee	D	64	1	17	18	−2	106	11	0	4	4	3	20
5	Brent Hughes‡	D	29	2	11	13	−8	32	—	—	—	—	—	—
25	Jean Potvin‡	D	35	3	9	12	−1	10	—	—	—	—	—	—
2	Ed Van Impe	D	72	1	11	12	22	76	11	0	0	0	−3	16
6	Wayne Hillman	D	74	0	10	10	16	33	8	0	0	0	1	0
29	Terry Crisp†	C	12	1	5	6	4	2	11	3	2	5	−1	2
20	Pierre Plante‡	RW	2	0	3	3	3	0	—	—	—	—	—	—
1	Doug Favell	G	44	0	2	2		4	11	0	0	0		2
35 (Note: Belhumeur wore number 30 in his first four games.)	Michel Belhumeur	G	23	0	1	1		2	1	0	0	0		0
30	Bobby Taylor	G	23	0	1	1		0	—	—	—	—	—	—
15 (Note: Wright wore number 20 in his sixth game.)	Larry Wright	C	9	0	1	1	−3	4	—	—	—	—	—	—
3	Willie Brossart	D	4	0	1	1	−5	0	—	—	—	—	—	—
26	Orest Kindrachuk	C	2	0	0	0	0	0	—	—	—	—	—	—
20	Jimmy Watson	D	4	0	1	1	−1	5	2	0	0	0	0	0

=== Goaltending ===
No.	Player	Regular season											Playoffs									
No.	Player	GP	GS	W	L	T	SA	GA	GAA	SV%	SO	TOI	GP	GS	W	L	SA	GA	GAA	SV%	SO	TOI
1	Doug Favell	44	39	20	15	4	1365	114	2.83	.916	3	2,413	11	11	5	6	359	29	2.61	.919	1	666
35	Michel Belhumeur	23	19	9	7	3	617	60	3.23	.903	0	1,115	1	0	0	0	9	1	5.94	.889	0	10
30	Bobby Taylor	23	20	8	8	4	697	78	4.10	.888	0	1,141	—	—	—	—	—	—	—	—	—	—

== Awards and records ==
=== Awards ===
Type	Award/honor	Recipient	Ref
League (annual)	Hart Memorial Trophy	Bobby Clarke	
League (annual)	NHL second All-Star team	Bobby Clarke (Center)	
League (in-season)	NHL All-Star Game selection	Bobby Clarke	
League (in-season)	NHL All-Star Game selection	Gary Dornhoefer	

=== Records ===
Among the team records set during the 1972–73 season was a road losing streak of eight games from October 25 to November 26, which was later matched during the 1987–88 season. On February 13, Rick MacLeish became the first Flyer to score four goals in a game, a team record that has been tied but not surpassed in regular season play several times since. MacLeish's three goals in the second period of that game also tied the team record and the 19 minutes and 47 seconds it took him to score all four goals is the fastest four-goal game in team history. A few weeks later on March 4, MacLeish scored four goals in a game again, this time also tying the team record for points in a single period (4). On March 31, the Flyers scored a team record eight goals during the second period of a game against the New York Islanders. During a 4–1 win over the Minnesota North Stars on April 5, Barry Ashbee became the first Flyer to record three assists in a period during a playoff game. The victory was the Flyers first playoff win since game six of their 1968 series against the St. Louis Blues, snapping a franchise record ten game playoff losing streak.

=== Milestones ===
Milestone	Player	Date	Ref
First game	Tom Bladon	October 7, 1972	
First game	Bill Barber	October 29, 1972	
First game	Orest Kindrachuk	November 9, 1972	
First game	Michel Belhumeur	November 15, 1972	
First game	Jimmy Watson	February 20, 1973	

=== Franchise firsts ===
Milestone	Player	Date	Ref
4-goal game	Rick MacLeish	February 13, 1973	
40-goal season	Rick MacLeish	March 4, 1973	
100-point season	Bobby Clarke	March 29, 1973	
50-goal season	Rick MacLeish	April 1, 1973	
Shutout, playoffs	Doug Favell	April 8, 1973	

== Transactions ==
The Flyers were involved in the following transactions from May 12, 1972, the day after the deciding game of the 1972 Stanley Cup Final, through May 10, 1973, the day of the deciding game of the 1973 Stanley Cup Final.

=== Trades ===
Date	Details		Ref
June 8, 1972	To Philadelphia Flyers: cash	To Minnesota North Stars: 10th-round pick in 1972	
August 10, 1972	To Philadelphia Flyers: John McKenzie	To Boston Bruins: cash	
December 14, 1972	To Philadelphia Flyers: Andre Dupont; 3rd-round pick in 1973	To St. Louis Blues: Brent Hughes; Pierre Plante	
March 4, 1973	To Philadelphia Flyers: Terry Crisp	To New York Islanders: Jean Potvin; Player to be named later (Note: The Flyers sent Glen Irwin to New York on May 29, 1973, to complete trade.)	

=== Players acquired ===
Date	Player	Former team	Via	Ref
September 1972	Jack McIlhargey	Flin Flon Bombers (WCHL)	Free agency	

=== Players lost ===
Date	Player	New team	Via	Ref
May 25, 1972	Dick Sarrazin	New England Whalers (WHA)	Free agency	
May 30, 1972	Earl Heiskala	Los Angeles Sharks (WHA)	Free agency	
June 6, 1972	Larry Hale	Atlanta Flames	Expansion draft	
June 6, 1972	Eddie Joyal	Alberta Oilers (WHA)	Free agency	
June 6, 1972	Jim Mair	New York Islanders	Expansion draft	
June 6, 1972	Lew Morrison	Atlanta Flames	Expansion draft	
June 8, 1972	Andre Gaudette	Richmond Robins (AHL)	Reverse draft	
June 8, 1972	Hank Nowak	Hershey Bears (AHL)	Reverse draft	
June 28, 1972	Michel Parizeau	Quebec Nordiques (WHA)	Free agency (Note: Flyers retained NHL rights)	
July 19, 1972	Ralph MacSweyn	Los Angeles Sharks (WHA)	Free agency	
August 8, 1972	Don McLeod	Houston Aeros (WHA)	Free agency	
August 29, 1972	Jean-Guy Gendron	Quebec Nordiques (WHA)	Free agency	

=== Signings ===
Date	Player	Term	Ref
May 21, 1972	Dave Schultz	2-year	
May 22, 1972	Rick Foley	3-year	
May 22, 1972	Bob Kelly	2-year	
May 22, 1972	Simon Nolet	multi-year	
May 24, 1972	Rick MacLeish	3-year	
May 26, 1972	Bill Clement	2-year	
May 26, 1972	Joe Watson	2-year	
May 31, 1972	Don Saleski	2-year	
June 2, 1972	Michel Belhumeur	3-year	
June 2, 1972	Gary Dornhoefer	3-year	
June 2, 1972	Ross Lonsberry	multi-year	
June 2, 1972	Lew Morrison	2-year	
June 2, 1972	Jean Potvin	multi-year	
June 2, 1972	Ed Van Impe	multi-year	
June 5, 1972	Doug Favell	3-year	
June 19, 1972	Bill Flett	3-year	
June 20, 1972	Bill Barber	3-year	
June 20, 1972	Tom Bladon	3-year	
June 20, 1972	Al MacAdam	2-year	
June 20, 1972	Jimmy Watson	2-year	
August 15, 1972	Barry Ashbee	3-year	
August 15, 1972	Yvon Bilodeau		
August 15, 1972	Willie Brossart		
August 15, 1972	Bob Currier	2-year	
August 15, 1972	Rene Drolet		
August 15, 1972	Andre Gaudette		
August 15, 1972	Wayne Hillman		
August 15, 1972	Orest Kindrachuk		
August 15, 1972	Roger Kosar		
August 15, 1972	Danny Schock		
August 15, 1972	Tom Trevelyan		
September 12, 1972	Brent Hughes		

== Draft picks ==
Philadelphia's picks at the 1972 NHL amateur draft, which was held at the Queen Elizabeth Hotel in Montreal, on June 8, 1972. The Flyers traded their tenth-round pick, 148th overall, to the Minnesota North Stars for cash during the draft.

Round	Pick	Player	Position	Nationality	Team (league)
1	7	Bill Barber	Left wing	Canada	Kitchener Rangers (OHA)
2	23	Tom Bladon	Defense	Canada	Edmonton Oil Kings (WCHL)
3	39	Jimmy Watson	Defense	Canada	Calgary Centennials (WCHL)
4	55	Al MacAdam	Right wing	Canada	Charlottetown Islanders (MJHL)
5	71	Daryl Fedorak	Goaltender	Canada	Victoria Cougars (WCHL)
6	87	Dave Hasting	Goaltender	Canada	Charlottetown Islanders (MJHL)
7	103	Serge Beaudoin	Defense	Canada	Trois-Rivières Ducs (QMJHL)
8	119	Pat Russell	Right wing	Canada	Vancouver Nats (WCHL)
9	135	Ray Boutin	Goaltender	Canada	Sorel Black Hawks (QMJHL)

== Farm teams ==
The Flyers were affiliated with the Richmond Robins of the AHL, the San Diego Gulls of the WHL, and the Jersey Devils of the EHL.
