= 1972–73 Vancouver Canucks season =

3rd season in franchise history

1972–73 Vancouver Canucks
- Division: 7th East
- 1972–73 record: 22–47–9
- Home record: 17–18–4
- Road record: 5–29–5
- Goals for: 233
- Goals against: 339

Team information
- General manager: Bud Poile
- Coach: Vic Stasiuk
- Captain: Orland Kurtenbach
- Alternate captains: Andre Boudrias; Barry Wilkins; Jocelyn Guevremont; Wayne Maki
- Arena: Pacific Coliseum
- Average attendance: 15,890

Team leaders
- Goals: Bobby Schmautz (38)
- Assists: Andre Boudrias (40)
- Points: Bobby Schmautz (71)
- Penalty minutes: Bobby Schmautz (137)
- Wins: Dunc Wilson (13)
- Goals against average: Dunc Wilson (3.94)

The 1972–73 Vancouver Canucks season was the team's 3rd in the NHL. Vancouver finished 7th in the East Division for the second consecutive season, failing to reach the playoffs again.

== Regular season ==
=== Final standings ===
East Division
		GP	W	L	T	GF	GA	DIFF	Pts
1	Montreal Canadiens	78	52	10	16	329	184	+145	120
2	Boston Bruins	78	51	22	5	330	235	+95	107
3	New York Rangers	78	47	23	8	297	208	+89	102
4	Buffalo Sabres	78	37	27	14	257	219	+38	88
5	Detroit Red Wings	78	37	29	12	265	243	+22	86
6	Toronto Maple Leafs	78	27	41	10	247	279	−32	64
7	Vancouver Canucks	78	22	47	9	233	339	−106	53
8	New York Islanders	78	12	60	6	170	347	−177	30

=== Record vs. opponents ===
==== Vs. East Division ====
1972–73 NHL records
Team	BOS	BUF	DET	MTL	NYI	NYR	TOR	VAN	Total
Boston	—	4–1–1	3–2	1–3–1	5–1	3–3	4–1	4–1	24–12–2
Buffalo	1–4–1	—	1–4	1–2–2	5–0–1	5–1	4–1	3–2	20–14–4
Detroit	2–3	4–1	—	2–3–1	4–1	1–3–1	4–2	3–0–3	20–13–5
Montreal	3–1–1	2–1–2	3–2–1	—	5–0	3–0–2	5–0–1	6–0	27–4–7
N.Y. Islanders	1–5	0–5–1	1–4	0–5	—	0–6	1–4	1–3–1	4–32–2
N.Y. Rangers	3–3	1–5	3–1–1	0–3–2	6–0	—	4–1	3–2	20–15–3
Toronto	1–4	1–4	2–4	0–5–1	4–1	1–4	—	2–3–1	11–25–2
Vancouver	1–4	2–3	0–3–3	0–6	3–1–1	2–3	3–2–1	—	11–22–5

==== Vs. West Division ====
1972–73 NHL records
Team	ATL	CAL	CHI	LAK	MIN	PHI	PIT	STL	Total
Boston	5–0	4–0–1	2–3	3–2	3–1–1	4–0–1	4–1	2–3	27–10–3
Buffalo	2–1–2	1–2–2	2–3	2–1–2	3–2	2–3	3–0–2	2–1–2	17–13–10
Detroit	3–2	2–2–1	2–3	2–2–1	1–3–1	3–1–1	2–0–3	2–3	17–16–7
Montreal	3–0–2	3–0–2	2–3	4–0–1	3–1–1	2–2–1	5–0	3–0–2	25–6–9
N.Y. Islanders	0–4–1	4–1	0–4–1	1–4	1–4	1–4	0–4–1	1–3–1	8–28–4
N.Y. Rangers	4–1	3–1–1	2–2–1	3–0–2	3–2	4–0–1	3–2	5–0	27–8–5
Toronto	1–2–2	3–1–1	1–2–2	3–2	2–2–1	1–3–1	2–2–1	3–2	16–16–8
Vancouver	1–4	4–1	1–3–1	2–3	0–3–2	0–4–1	2–3	1–4	11–25–4

== Schedule and results ==
1972–73 regular season
October

Game	Result	Date	Score	Opponent	Record
1	W	October 7, 1972	3–2	California Golden Seals (1972–73)	1–0–0
2	L	October 11, 1972	3–5	@ New York Rangers (1972–73)	1–1–0
3	L	October 12, 1972	3–7	@ Philadelphia Flyers (1972–73)	1–2–0
4	T	October 14, 1972	3–3	@ Minnesota North Stars (1972–73)	1–2–1
5	W	October 17, 1972	6–3	Chicago Black Hawks (1972–73)	2–2–1
6	L	October 19, 1972	0–6	@ Buffalo Sabres (1972–73)	2–3–1
7	L	October 21, 1972	3–5	@ Montreal Canadiens (1972–73)	2–4–1
8	W	October 22, 1972	5–4	@ Boston Bruins (1972–73)	3–4–1
9	L	October 24, 1972	0–4	Pittsburgh Penguins (1972–73)	3–5–1
10	L	October 28, 1972	1–2	Atlanta Flames (1972–73)	3–6–1
11	L	October 31, 1972	1–4	@ Los Angeles Kings (1972–73)	3–7–1

November

Game	Result	Date	Score	Opponent	Record
12	W	November 3, 1972	7–2	New York Islanders (1972–73)	4–7–1
13	L	November 5, 1972	2–4	Boston Bruins (1972–73)	4–8–1
14	L	November 8, 1972	2–5	@ New York Rangers (1972–73)	4–9–1
15	W	November 11, 1972	4–3	@ Pittsburgh Penguins (1972–73)	5–9–1
16	L	November 12, 1972	1–3	@ Atlanta Flames (1972–73)	5–10–1
17	T	November 14, 1972	3–3	Detroit Red Wings (1972–73)	5–10–2
18	W	November 17, 1972	8–4	Los Angeles Kings (1972–73)	6–10–2
19	W	November 19, 1972	9–5	Buffalo Sabres (1972–73)	7–10–2
20	L	November 21, 1972	2–4	@ St. Louis Blues (1972–73)	7–11–2
21	L	November 22, 1972	2–5	@ Chicago Black Hawks (1972–73)	7–12–2
22	L	November 24, 1972	1–9	Montreal Canadiens (1972–73)	7–13–2
23	L	November 26, 1972	1–3	Minnesota North Stars (1972–73)	7–14–2
24	W	November 28, 1972	2–1	New York Rangers (1972–73)	8–14–2

December

Game	Result	Date	Score	Opponent	Record
25	L	December 1, 1972	2–6	St. Louis Blues (1972–73)	8–15–2
26	L	December 5, 1972	2–5	Toronto Maple Leafs (1972–73)	8–16–2
27	L	December 7, 1972	2–5	@ Atlanta Flames (1972–73)	8–17–2
28	T	December 9, 1972	5–5	@ Toronto Maple Leafs (1972–73)	8–17–3
29	T	December 10, 1972	3–3	@ Detroit Red Wings (1972–73)	8–17–4
30	L	December 12, 1972	1–5	Chicago Black Hawks (1972–73)	8–18–4
31	L	December 15, 1972	2–4	Montreal Canadiens (1972–73)	8–19–4
32	W	December 16, 1972	4–3	California Golden Seals (1972–73)	9–19–4
33	L	December 20, 1972	3–6	@ Buffalo Sabres (1972–73)	9–20–4
34	T	December 21, 1972	4–4	@ New York Islanders (1972–73)	9–20–5
35	L	December 23, 1972	1–5	@ Detroit Red Wings (1972–73)	9–21–5
36	W	December 26, 1972	4–3	California Golden Seals (1972–73)	10–21–5
37	T	December 29, 1972	4–4	Philadelphia Flyers (1972–73)	10–21–6
38	W	December 30, 1972	5–2	New York Islanders (1972–73)	11–21–6

January

Game	Result	Date	Score	Opponent	Record
39	L	January 1, 1973	2–8	Boston Bruins (1972–73)	11–22–6
40	L	January 3, 1973	3–11	@ California Golden Seals (1972–73)	11–23–6
41	L	January 6, 1973	2–4	@ Pittsburgh Penguins (1972–73)	11–24–6
42	L	January 7, 1973	2–5	@ Atlanta Flames (1972–73)	11–25–6
43	W	January 9, 1973	3–0	St. Louis Blues (1972–73)	12–25–6
44	L	January 12, 1973	1–7	Detroit Red Wings (1972–73)	12–26–6
45	L	January 14, 1973	0–3	Montreal Canadiens (1972–73)	12–27–6
46	W	January 16, 1973	6–4	Toronto Maple Leafs (1972–73)	13–27–6
47	L	January 19, 1973	0–4	Los Angeles Kings (1972–73)	13–28–6
48	L	January 20, 1973	3–4	New York Rangers (1972–73)	13–29–6
49	T	January 24, 1973	3–3	@ Chicago Black Hawks (1972–73)	13–29–7
50	W	January 26, 1973	5–1	New York Islanders (1972–73)	14–29–7
51	L	January 27, 1973	1–3	St. Louis Blues (1972–73)	14–30–7

February

Game	Result	Date	Score	Opponent	Record
52	L	February 1, 1973	4–5	@ Philadelphia Flyers (1972–73)	14–31–7
53	W	February 3, 1973	2–1	@ Toronto Maple Leafs (1972–73)	15–31–7
54	L	February 4, 1973	2–8	@ Detroit Red Wings (1972–73)	15–32–7
55	L	February 6, 1973	1–5	@ St. Louis Blues (1972–73)	15–33–7
56	L	February 9, 1973	5–10	Philadelphia Flyers (1972–73)	15–34–7
57	L	February 11, 1973	3–6	@ Minnesota North Stars (1972–73)	15–35–7
58	L	February 13, 1973	3–7	@ Boston Bruins (1972–73)	15–36–7
59	L	February 14, 1973	2–6	@ Pittsburgh Penguins (1972–73)	15–37–7
60	W	February 16, 1973	5–0	Atlanta Flames (1972–73)	16–37–7
61	T	February 17, 1973	2–2	Detroit Red Wings (1972–73)	16–37–8
62	L	February 20, 1973	6–7	Boston Bruins (1972–73)	16–38–8
63	L	February 22, 1973	1–3	@ Buffalo Sabres (1972–73)	16–39–8
64	L	February 24, 1973	3–7	@ Montreal Canadiens (1972–73)	16–40–8
65	L	February 28, 1973	2–7	@ Toronto Maple Leafs (1972–73)	16–41–8

March

Game	Result	Date	Score	Opponent	Record
66	L	March 3, 1973	3–9	@ New York Islanders (1972–73)	16–42–8
67	W	March 4, 1973	4–3	@ New York Rangers (1972–73)	17–42–8
68	W	March 9, 1973	5–2	Buffalo Sabres (1972–73)	18–42–8
69	L	March 10, 1973	2–4	Chicago Black Hawks (1972–73)	18–43–8
70	W	March 14, 1973	5–2	@ California Golden Seals (1972–73)	19–43–8
71	W	March 16, 1973	4–2	Los Angeles Kings (1972–73)	20–43–8
72	W	March 17, 1973	6–1	Pittsburgh Penguins (1972–73)	21–43–8
73	L	March 21, 1973	2–3	@ Montreal Canadiens (1972–73)	21–44–8
74	L	March 22, 1973	0–9	@ Philadelphia Flyers (1972–73)	21–45–8
75	W	March 25, 1973	7–4	Toronto Maple Leafs (1972–73)	22–45–8
76	L	March 27, 1973	3–4	@ Minnesota North Stars (1972–73)	22–46–8
77	T	March 30, 1973	3–3	Minnesota North Stars (1972–73)	22–46–9
78	L	March 31, 1973	3–6	@ Los Angeles Kings (1972–73)	22–47–9

Legend: Win (2 points) Loss (0 points) Tie (1 point)

== Awards and records ==
=== Trophies and awards ===
- Cyclone Taylor Award (Canucks MVP): Orland Kurtenbach
- Cyrus H. McLean Trophy (Canucks Leading Scorer): Bobby Schmautz
- Babe Pratt Trophy (Canucks Outstanding Defenceman): Barry Wilkins
- Fred J. Hume Award (Canucks Unsung Hero): Dennis Kearns
- Most Exciting Player: Bobby Schmautz

== Draft picks ==
Vancouver's picks at the 1972 NHL amateur draft. The draft was held at the Queen Elizabeth Hotel in Montreal.

Round	#	Player	Nationality	College/junior/club team (league)
1	3	Don Lever (LW)	Canada	Niagara Falls Flyers (OHA)
2	19	Bryan McSheffrey (F)	Canada	Ottawa 67's (OHA)
3	35	Paul Raymer (F)	Canada	Peterborough Petes (OHA)
4	51	Ron Homenuke (F)	Canada	Calgary Centennials (WCHL)
5	67	Larry Bolonchuk (D)	Canada	Winnipeg Jets (WCHL)
6	83	Dave McLelland (G)	Canada	Brandon Wheat Kings (WCHL)
7	99	Danny Gloor (C)	Canada	Peterborough Petes (OHA)
8	115	Dennis McCord (D)	Canada	London Knights (OHA)
9	131	Steve Stone (RW)	Canada	Niagara Falls Flyers (OHA)

== See also ==
- 1972–73 NHL season
