= 1972–73 Minnesota North Stars season =

National Hockey League team season

1972–73 Minnesota North Stars
- Division: 3rd West
- 1972–73 record: 37–30–11
- Home record: 26–8–5
- Road record: 11–22–6
- Goals for: 254
- Goals against: 230

Team information
- General manager: Wren Blair
- Coach: Jack Gordon
- Captain: Ted Harris
- Alternate captains: J. P. Parise; Barry Gibbs; Charlie Burns
- Arena: Met Center

Team leaders
- Goals: Danny Grant (32)
- Assists: Dennis Hextall (52)
- Points: Dennis Hextall (82)
- Penalty minutes: Dennis Hextall (140)
- Wins: Cesare Maniago (21)
- Goals against average: Gump Worsley (2.88)

The 1972–73 Minnesota North Stars season was the North Stars' sixth season.

Coached by Jack Gordon, the team compiled a record of 37–30–11 for 85 points, to finish the regular season 3rd in the West Division. In the playoffs they lost the quarterfinals 4–2 to the Philadelphia Flyers.

== Regular season ==
=== Final standings ===
West Division
		GP	W	L	T	GF	GA	DIFF	Pts
1	Chicago Black Hawks	78	42	27	9	284	225	+59	93
2	Philadelphia Flyers	78	37	30	11	296	256	+40	85
3	Minnesota North Stars	78	37	30	11	254	230	+24	85
4	St. Louis Blues	78	32	34	12	233	251	−18	76
5	Pittsburgh Penguins	78	32	37	9	257	265	−8	73
6	Los Angeles Kings	78	31	36	11	232	245	−13	73
7	Atlanta Flames	78	25	38	15	191	239	−48	65
8	California Golden Seals	78	16	46	16	213	323	−110	48

=== Record vs. opponents ===
==== Vs. West Division ====
1972–73 NHL records
Team	ATL	CAL	CHI	LAK	MIN	PHI	PIT	STL	Total
Atlanta	—	3–1–1	2–4	1–1–3	3–3	1–3–1	1–4	0–3–3	11–19–8
California	1–3–1	—	0–3–2	2–4	1–4	1–3–2	2–2–2	1–3–1	8–22–8
Chicago	4–2	3–0–2	—	2–3	3–2–1	2–2–1	2–3	3–3	19–15–4
Los Angeles	1–1–3	4–2	3–2	—	0–3–2	4–2	2–4	3–2	17–16–5
Minnesota	3–3	4–1	2–3–1	3–0–2	—	2–3	3–2	2–2–2	19–14–5
Philadelphia	3–1–1	3–1–2	2–2–1	2–4	3–2	—	4–2	3–1–1	20–13–5
Pittsburgh	4–1	2–2–2	3–2	4–2	2–3	2–4	—	3–2	20–16–2
St. Louis	3–0–3	3–1–1	3–3	2–3	2–2–2	1–3–1	2–3	—	16–15–7

==== Vs. East Division ====
1972–73 NHL records
Team	BOS	BUF	DET	MTL	NYI	NYR	TOR	VAN	Total
Atlanta	0–5	1–2–2	2–3	0–3–2	4–0–1	1–4	2–1–2	4–1	14–19–7
California	0–4–1	2–1–2	2–2–1	0–3–2	1–4	1–3–1	1–3–1	1–4	8–24–8
Chicago	3–2	3–2	3–2	3–2	4–0–1	2–2–1	2–1–2	3–1–1	23–12–5
Los Angeles	2–3	1–2–2	2–2–1	0–4–1	4–1	0–3–2	2–3	3–2	14–20–6
Minnesota	1–3–1	2–3	3–1–1	1–3–1	4–1	2–3	2–2–1	3–0–2	18–16–6
Philadelphia	0–4–1	3–2	1–3–1	2–2–1	4–1	0–4–1	3–1–1	4–0–1	17–17–6
Pittsburgh	1–4	0–3–2	0–2–3	0–5	4–0–1	2–3	2–2–1	3–2	12–21–7
St. Louis	3–2	1–2–2	3–2	0–3–2	3–1–1	0–5	2–3	4–1	16–19–5

== Schedule and results ==
1972–73 regular season
October

Game	Result	Date	Score	Opponent	Record
1	L	October 7, 1972	0–3	@ Montreal Canadiens (1972–73)	0–1–0
2	W	October 11, 1972	5–2	California Golden Seals (1972–73)	1–1–0
3	T	October 14, 1972	3–3	Vancouver Canucks (1972–73)	1–1–1
4	L	October 15, 1972	2–6	@ New York Rangers (1972–73)	1–2–1
5	W	October 18, 1972	6–0	@ Atlanta Flames (1972–73)	2–2–1
6	L	October 21, 1972	2–3	Atlanta Flames (1972–73)	2–3–1
7	W	October 24, 1972	2–1	@ St. Louis Blues (1972–73)	3–3–1
8	L	October 25, 1972	3–4	Toronto Maple Leafs (1972–73)	3–4–1
9	W	October 28, 1972	2–1	Philadelphia Flyers (1972–73)	4–4–1
10	L	October 29, 1972	1–2	@ Buffalo Sabres (1972–73)	4–5–1

November

Game	Result	Date	Score	Opponent	Record
11	T	November 1, 1972	3–3	St. Louis Blues (1972–73)	4–5–2
12	W	November 4, 1972	5–3	Chicago Black Hawks (1972–73)	5–5–2
13	W	November 8, 1972	5–2	California Golden Seals (1972–73)	6–5–2
14	L	November 10, 1972	1–5	@ Atlanta Flames (1972–73)	6–6–2
15	W	November 11, 1972	3–0	New York Islanders (1972–73)	7–6–2
16	W	November 14, 1972	4–1	Los Angeles Kings (1972–73)	8–6–2
17	L	November 15, 1972	1–7	@ Pittsburgh Penguins (1972–73)	8–7–2
18	T	November 18, 1972	4–4	@ Toronto Maple Leafs (1972–73)	8–7–3
19	W	November 19, 1972	5–1	@ Chicago Black Hawks (1972–73)	9–7–3
20	W	November 22, 1972	3–1	Toronto Maple Leafs (1972–73)	10–7–3
21	W	November 25, 1972	3–0	@ Los Angeles Kings (1972–73)	11–7–3
22	W	November 26, 1972	3–1	@ Vancouver Canucks (1972–73)	12–7–3
23	W	November 29, 1972	5–0	Atlanta Flames (1972–73)	13–7–3

December

Game	Result	Date	Score	Opponent	Record
24	W	December 2, 1972	8–6	Buffalo Sabres (1972–73)	14–7–3
25	L	December 3, 1972	4–7	@ Buffalo Sabres (1972–73)	14–8–3
26	L	December 6, 1972	3–6	@ Montreal Canadiens (1972–73)	14–9–3
27	L	December 7, 1972	2–6	@ Philadelphia Flyers (1972–73)	14–10–3
28	W	December 9, 1972	7–0	Detroit Red Wings (1972–73)	15–10–3
29	L	December 10, 1972	1–5	@ Chicago Black Hawks (1972–73)	15–11–3
30	W	December 13, 1972	7–2	Philadelphia Flyers (1972–73)	16–11–3
31	W	December 16, 1972	5–1	New York Rangers (1972–73)	17–11–3
32	L	December 17, 1972	4–6	@ Detroit Red Wings (1972–73)	17–12–3
33	W	December 20, 1972	5–2	@ California Golden Seals (1972–73)	18–12–3
34	L	December 23, 1972	2–4	@ New York Islanders (1972–73)	18–13–3
35	W	December 27, 1972	3–2	Montreal Canadiens (1972–73)	19–13–3
36	L	December 29, 1972	0–2	Boston Bruins (1972–73)	19–14–3
37	T	December 31, 1972	4–4	@ Detroit Red Wings (1972–73)	19–14–4

January

Game	Result	Date	Score	Opponent	Record
38	L	January 6, 1973	0–2	Chicago Black Hawks (1972–73)	19–15–4
39	T	January 8, 1973	3–3	@ Montreal Canadiens (1972–73)	19–15–5
40	L	January 10, 1973	0–6	Montreal Canadiens (1972–73)	19–16–5
41	T	January 11, 1973	1–1	@ Boston Bruins (1972–73)	19–16–6
42	W	January 13, 1973	8–1	New York Islanders (1972–73)	20–16–6
43	W	January 16, 1973	1–0	@ New York Islanders (1972–73)	21–16–6
44	L	January 18, 1973	1–6	@ Philadelphia Flyers (1972–73)	21–17–6
45	T	January 20, 1973	3–3	Chicago Black Hawks (1972–73)	21–17–7
46	W	January 21, 1973	5–3	@ Detroit Red Wings (1972–73)	22–17–7
47	T	January 23, 1973	5–5	Los Angeles Kings (1972–73)	22–17–8
48	L	January 25, 1973	2–5	@ Buffalo Sabres (1972–73)	22–18–8
49	L	January 28, 1973	1–5	@ Chicago Black Hawks (1972–73)	22–19–8

February

Game	Result	Date	Score	Opponent	Record
50	L	February 1, 1973	1–3	@ Atlanta Flames (1972–73)	22–20–8
51	L	February 3, 1973	1–2	@ Pittsburgh Penguins (1972–73)	22–21–8
52	W	February 4, 1973	4–3	Pittsburgh Penguins (1972–73)	23–21–8
53	L	February 7, 1973	2–3	Boston Bruins (1972–73)	23–22–8
54	L	February 8, 1973	2–3	@ St. Louis Blues (1972–73)	23–23–8
55	W	February 10, 1973	3–1	Detroit Red Wings (1972–73)	24–23–8
56	W	February 11, 1973	6–3	Vancouver Canucks (1972–73)	25–23–8
57	W	February 14, 1973	5–2	St. Louis Blues (1972–73)	26–23–8
58	W	February 17, 1973	5–2	Boston Bruins (1972–73)	27–23–8
59	L	February 18, 1973	1–5	@ Philadelphia Flyers (1972–73)	27–24–8
60	L	February 21, 1973	2–5	St. Louis Blues (1972–73)	27–25–8
61	W	February 24, 1973	4–2	Buffalo Sabres (1972–73)	28–25–8
62	L	February 25, 1973	5–6	@ New York Rangers (1972–73)	28–26–8
63	W	February 28, 1973	7–3	California Golden Seals (1972–73)	29–26–8

March

Game	Result	Date	Score	Opponent	Record
64	W	March 3, 1973	3–0	Atlanta Flames (1972–73)	30–26–8
65	W	March 4, 1973	5–2	@ Pittsburgh Penguins (1972–73)	31–26–8
66	W	March 7, 1973	10–4	Pittsburgh Penguins (1972–73)	32–26–8
67	L	March 10, 1973	3–4	@ Toronto Maple Leafs (1972–73)	32–27–8
68	W	March 11, 1973	2–1	New York Islanders (1972–73)	33–27–8
69	T	March 13, 1973	2–2	Los Angeles Kings (1972–73)	33–27–9
70	W	March 15, 1973	5–2	Toronto Maple Leafs (1972–73)	34–27–9
71	W	March 17, 1973	4–3	@ Los Angeles Kings (1972–73)	35–27–9
72	L	March 18, 1973	0–2	@ California Golden Seals (1972–73)	35–28–9
73	L	March 20, 1973	1–6	New York Rangers (1972–73)	35–29–9
74	L	March 22, 1973	3–5	@ Boston Bruins (1972–73)	35–30–9
75	W	March 25, 1973	2–1	@ New York Rangers (1972–73)	36–30–9
76	W	March 27, 1973	4–3	Vancouver Canucks (1972–73)	37–30–9
77	T	March 28, 1973	3–3	@ St. Louis Blues (1972–73)	37–30–10
78	T	March 30, 1973	3–3	@ Vancouver Canucks (1972–73)	37–30–11

Legend: Win (2 points) Loss (0 points) Tie (1 point)

== Draft picks ==
Minnesota's draft picks at the 1972 NHL amateur draft held at the Queen Elizabeth Hotel in Montreal.

Round	#	Player	Nationality	College/Junior/Club team (League)
1	12	Jerry Byers	Canada	Kitchener Rangers (OMJHL)
3	44	Terry Ryan	Canada	Hamilton Red Wings (OMJHL)
4	60	Tom Thomson	Canada	Toronto Marlboros (OMJHL)
5	76	Chris Ahrens	United States	Kitchener Rangers (OMJHL)
6	92	Steve West	Canada	Oshawa Generals (OMJHL)
7	108	Chris Meloff	Canada	Kitchener Rangers (OMJHL)
8	116	Scott MacPhail	Canada	Montreal Junior Canadiens (OMJHL)
8	124	Bob Lundeen	United States	University of Wisconsin (WCHA)
9	140	Glen Mikkelson	Canada	Brandon Wheat Kings (WCHL)
10	145	Steve Lyon	Canada	Peterborough Petes (OMJHL)
10	147	Juri Kudrasovs	Canada	Kitchener Rangers (OMJHL)
10	148	Marcel Comeau	Canada	Edmonton Oil Kings (WCHL)

== See also ==
- 1972–73 NHL season
