= Brent Hughes (ice hockey, born 1943) =

Canadian ice hockey player

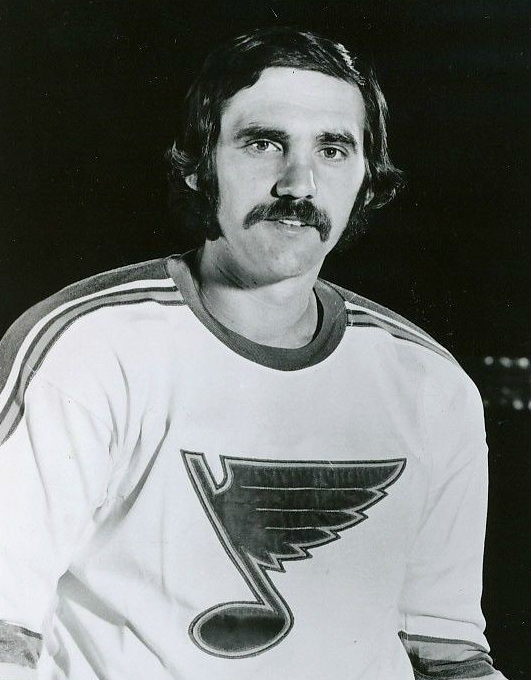
- St. Louis Blues 1973
- Born: June 17, 1943 (age 81); Bowmanville, Ontario, Canada
- Height: 6 ft 0 in (183 cm)
- Weight: 205 lb (93 kg; 14 st 9 lb)
- Position: Defence
- Shot: Left
- Played for: Los Angeles Kings; Philadelphia Flyers; St. Louis Blues; Detroit Red Wings; Kansas City Scouts; San Diego Mariners; Birmingham Bulls
- Playing career: 1963–1980

Brent Hughes (born June 17, 1943) is a Canadian former ice hockey defenceman.

== Career ==
During his career, Hughes played in the NHL for the Los Angeles Kings, Philadelphia Flyers, St. Louis Blues, Detroit Red Wings, and Kansas City Scouts. He also played in the World Hockey Association with the San Diego Mariners and Birmingham Bulls.

In his NHL career, Hughes played in 435 games, scoring 15 goals and 117 assists. In the WHA, he appeared in 268 games, scoring 23 goals and 79 assists.

== Personal life ==
Hughes married Sandy Lindemuth in 1984. He has three children from a previous marriage.

== Career statistics ==
=== Regular season and playoffs ===
			Regular season					Playoffs
Season	Team	League	GP	G	A	Pts	PIM	GP	G	A	Pts	PIM
1959–60	Toronto Marlboros	OHA-Jr.	16	0	1	1	4	—	—	—	—	—
1961–62	St. Catharines Teepees	OHA-Jr.	41	1	7	8	46	6	1	1	2	6
1962–63	St. Catharines Black Hawks	OHA-Jr.	50	9	18	27	78	—	—	—	—	—
1963–64	New Haven Blades	EHL	53	6	25	31	100	5	0	1	1	0
1964–65	Minneapolis Bruins	CPHL	68	2	16	18	79	5	2	0	2	13
1965–66	Memphis Wings	CHL	70	4	21	25	50	—	—	—	—	—
1966–67	Pittsburgh Hornets	AHL	5	2	4	6	4	—	—	—	—	—
1966–67	Memphis Wings	CPHL	52	3	15	18	49	7	0	2	2	6
1967–68	Los Angeles Kings	NHL	44	4	10	14	36	7	0	0	0	10
1967–68	Springfield Kings	AHL	25	5	14	19	30	—	—	—	—	—
1968–69	Los Angeles Kings	NHL	72	2	19	21	73	11	1	3	4	37
1969–70	Los Angeles Kings	NHL	52	1	7	8	108	—	—	—	—	—
1969–70	Springfield Kings	AHL	3	0	0	0	10	12	0	3	3	51
1970–71	Philadelphia Flyers	NHL	30	1	10	11	21	4	0	0	0	6
1970–71	Quebec Aces	AHL	25	4	20	24	34	—	—	—	—	—
1971–72	Philadelphia Flyers	NHL	63	2	20	22	35	—	—	—	—	—
1971–72	Baltimore Clippers	AHL	10	2	4	6	6	—	—	—	—	—
1972–73	Philadelphia Flyers	NHL	29	2	11	13	32	—	—	—	—	—
1972–73	St. Louis Blues	NHL	8	1	1	2	0	—	—	—	—	—
1973–74	St. Louis Blues	NHL	2	0	0	0	0	—	—	—	—	—
1973–74	Detroit Red Wings	NHL	69	1	21	22	92	—	—	—	—	—
1974–75	Kansas City Scouts	NHL	66	1	18	19	43	—	—	—	—	—
1975–76	San Diego Mariners	WHA	78	7	28	35	63	10	1	5	6	6
1976–77	San Diego Mariners	WHA	62	4	13	17	48	7	1	4	5	0
1977–78	Birmingham Bulls	WHA	80	9	35	44	48	5	0	0	0	12
1978–79	Birmingham Bulls	WHA	48	3	3	6	21	—	—	—	—	—
1978–79	Binghamton Dusters	AHL	8	1	2	3	8	—	—	—	—	—
1979–80	Cincinnati Stingers	CHL	11	0	1	1	0	—	—	—	—	—
NHL totals			435	15	117	132	440	22	1	3	4	53
WHA totals			268	23	79	102	180	22	2	9	11	18
