= 1972–73 Chicago Black Hawks season =

National Hockey League team season

1972–73 Chicago Black Hawks
- West Division champions
- Division: 1st West
- 1972–73 record: 42–27–9
- Home record: 26–9–4
- Road record: 16–18–5
- Goals for: 284
- Goals against: 225

Team information
- General manager: Tommy Ivan
- Coach: Billy Reay
- Captain: Vacant
- Alternate captains: Doug Jarrett; Stan Mikita; Bill White
- Arena: Chicago Stadium

Team leaders
- Goals: Jim Pappin (41)
- Assists: Pit Martin (61)
- Points: Jim Pappin (92)
- Penalty minutes: Phil Russell (156)
- Plus/minus: Phil Russell; Stan Mikita (+31)
- Wins: Tony Esposito (32)
- Goals against average: Tony Esposito (2.51)

The 1972–73 Chicago Black Hawks season was the Hawks' 47th season in the NHL, and the club was coming off their third consecutive first-place finish in 1971–72, as they finished on top of the West Division with a 46–17–15 record, tying a club record with 107 points. The Hawks defeated the St. Louis Blues and New York Rangers in the postseason before falling to the Montreal Canadiens in the Stanley Cup Finals.

During the off-season, the Black Hawks lost Bobby Hull to the Winnipeg Jets in the newly created World Hockey Association, who signed him to the first $1 million contract in hockey history. The NHL also expanded once again, as the New York Islanders joined the East Division, while the Atlanta Flames were placed in the West.

Chicago, dealing with the loss of Hull, got off to a quick start of the season, winning their first four games, before sliding into a slump that saw their record fall to 7–7–2. The club broke out of its slump, won 14 of the next 18 games, and took hold of the top spot in the West Division. The Hawks then cruised to their fourth-straight first-place finish, as they had a record of 42–27–9, earning 93 points, which was their lowest point total since missing the playoffs in the 1968–69 season.

Offensively, the Black Hawks were led by Jim Pappin, who had a career season, scoring 41 goals and 92 points. Pit Martin earned 61 assists and 90 points, while Dennis Hull scored 39 goals and 90 points. Stan Mikita earned 83 points despite missing 21 games due to injuries. Bill White lead the defense, registering 47 points, while Pat Stapleton scored 10 goals and 31 points. Rookie Phil Russell had a team-high 156 penalty minutes, and had a +31 rating, which tied him with Mikita for the team lead.

In goal, Tony Esposito led the club with 32 victories and a 2.51 GAA, along with four shutouts while appearing in 56 games. Backup goaltender Gary Smith won 10 games while having a 3.54 GAA.

== Season standings ==
West Division
		GP	W	L	T	GF	GA	DIFF	Pts
1	Chicago Black Hawks	78	42	27	9	284	225	+59	93
2	Philadelphia Flyers	78	37	30	11	296	256	+40	85
3	Minnesota North Stars	78	37	30	11	254	230	+24	85
4	St. Louis Blues	78	32	34	12	233	251	−18	76
5	Pittsburgh Penguins	78	32	37	9	257	265	−8	73
6	Los Angeles Kings	78	31	36	11	232	245	−13	73
7	Atlanta Flames	78	25	38	15	191	239	−48	65
8	California Golden Seals	78	16	46	16	213	323	−110	48

=== Record vs. opponents ===
==== Vs. West Division ====
1972–73 NHL records
Team	ATL	CAL	CHI	LAK	MIN	PHI	PIT	STL	Total
Atlanta	—	3–1–1	2–4	1–1–3	3–3	1–3–1	1–4	0–3–3	11–19–8
California	1–3–1	—	0–3–2	2–4	1–4	1–3–2	2–2–2	1–3–1	8–22–8
Chicago	4–2	3–0–2	—	2–3	3–2–1	2–2–1	2–3	3–3	19–15–4
Los Angeles	1–1–3	4–2	3–2	—	0–3–2	4–2	2–4	3–2	17–16–5
Minnesota	3–3	4–1	2–3–1	3–0–2	—	2–3	3–2	2–2–2	19–14–5
Philadelphia	3–1–1	3–1–2	2–2–1	2–4	3–2	—	4–2	3–1–1	20–13–5
Pittsburgh	4–1	2–2–2	3–2	4–2	2–3	2–4	—	3–2	20–16–2
St. Louis	3–0–3	3–1–1	3–3	2–3	2–2–2	1–3–1	2–3	—	16–15–7

==== Vs. East Division ====
1972–73 NHL records
Team	BOS	BUF	DET	MTL	NYI	NYR	TOR	VAN	Total
Atlanta	0–5	1–2–2	2–3	0–3–2	4–0–1	1–4	2–1–2	4–1	14–19–7
California	0–4–1	2–1–2	2–2–1	0–3–2	1–4	1–3–1	1–3–1	1–4	8–24–8
Chicago	3–2	3–2	3–2	3–2	4–0–1	2–2–1	2–1–2	3–1–1	23–12–5
Los Angeles	2–3	1–2–2	2–2–1	0–4–1	4–1	0–3–2	2–3	3–2	14–20–6
Minnesota	1–3–1	2–3	3–1–1	1–3–1	4–1	2–3	2–2–1	3–0–2	18–16–6
Philadelphia	0–4–1	3–2	1–3–1	2–2–1	4–1	0–4–1	3–1–1	4–0–1	17–17–6
Pittsburgh	1–4	0–3–2	0–2–3	0–5	4–0–1	2–3	2–2–1	3–2	12–21–7
St. Louis	3–2	1–2–2	3–2	0–3–2	3–1–1	0–5	2–3	4–1	16–19–5

== Playoffs ==
The Hawks opened the playoffs against the St. Louis Blues, who had a record of 32–34–12, earning 76 points, while placing fourth in the West Division. The series opened with two games at Chicago Stadium, and the Black Hawks easily defeated the Blues in the series opener, winning 7–1, before shutting out St. Louis, 1–0, in the second game to take an early series lead. The series shifted to the St. Louis Arena for the next two games; however, Chicago took a 3–0 series lead, winning 5–2 in the third game, but the Blues avoided the sweep, winning 5–3 in the fourth game. Chicago returned home for the fifth game, and easily took care of St. Louis, thumping the Blues 6–1 to win the series.

Chicago's next opponent was the New York Rangers for the third straight year, who had finished the season with a 47–23–8 record, earning 102 points, and a third-place finish in the East Division. The Rangers had just defeated the defending Stanley Cup champions, the Boston Bruins in their first playoff series. Since the Black Hawks won their division, they were given home-ice advantage in the series for the third straight year. The series opened up with two games at Chicago Stadium, but it was the Rangers who struck first, winning the series opener by a 4–1 score. he Black Hawks rebounded in the second game, holding off New York for a 5–4 victory to even the series. The series moved to Madison Square Garden for the next two games, and it would be the Hawks who took control of the series, defeating the Rangers 2–1 and 3–1 to take a 3–1 series lead back to Chicago for the fifth game. The Black Hawks stayed hot, and easily beat the Rangers 4–1 to win the series and advance to the Stanley Cup Finals for the second time in three years.

The Hawks opponent in the 1973 Stanley Cup Finals was the Montreal Canadiens, who were the best team in the league during the regular season, as they had a 52–10–16 record, earning 120 points. The Canadiens had defeated the Buffalo Sabres and Philadelphia Flyers to earn a spot in the finals. The series opened at the Montreal Forum, and the powerful Canadiens easily won the first game by an 8–3 score, followed by a 4–1 win in the second game to take a 2–0 series lead. The finals shifted to Chicago Stadium for the next two games, and the Hawks cut into the Canadiens series lead with a 7–4 victory in the third game. Montreal rebounded in the fourth game though, shutting out Chicago 4–0 to take a 3–1 series lead. The fifth game returned to Montreal; however, the Black Hawks stayed alive with a wild 8–7 victory, cutting the Canadiens lead to 3–2 in the series. In the sixth game back in Chicago, Montreal rebounded, defeating the Hawks, 6–4, to win the Stanley Cup.

== Schedule and results ==
=== Regular season ===
1972–73 regular season
October

Game	Date	Visitor	Score	Home	Record	Points
1	October 7	Chicago Black Hawks	3–1	Toronto Maple Leafs	1–0–0	2
2	October 8	New York Rangers	1–5	Chicago Black Hawks	2–0–0	4
3	October 11	Atlanta Flames	1–4	Chicago Black Hawks	3–0–0	6
4	October 14	Chicago Black Hawks	4–2	St. Louis Blues	4–0–0	8
5	October 15	St. Louis Blues	3–1	Chicago Black Hawks	4–1–0	8
6	October 17	Chicago Black Hawks	3–6	Vancouver Canucks	4–2–0	8
7	October 21	Chicago Black Hawks	1–3	Los Angeles Kings	4–3–0	8
8	October 22	Chicago Black Hawks	4–2	California Golden Seals	5–3–0	10
9	October 26	Chicago Black Hawks	6–3	Boston Bruins	6–3–0	12
10	October 28	Chicago Black Hawks	4–4	New York Islanders	6–3–1	13
11	October 29	Chicago Black Hawks	1–7	New York Rangers	6–4–1	13

November

Game	Date	Visitor	Score	Home	Record	Points
12	November 1	New York Rangers	3–2	Chicago Black Hawks	6–5–1	13
13	November 4	Chicago Black Hawks	3–5	Minnesota North Stars	6–6–1	13
14	November 5	California Golden Seals	3–3	Chicago Black Hawks	6–6–2	14
15	November 8	New York Islanders	1–6	Chicago Black Hawks	7–6–2	16
16	November 9	Chicago Black Hawks	3–5	Philadelphia Flyers	7–7–2	16
17	November 12	Detroit Red Wings	1–5	Chicago Black Hawks	8–7–2	18
18	November 18	Chicago Black Hawks	5–3	Montreal Canadiens	9–7–2	20
19	November 19	Minnesota North Stars	5–1	Chicago Black Hawks	9–8–2	20
20	November 22	Vancouver Canucks	2–5	Chicago Black Hawks	10–8–2	22
21	November 25	Chicago Black Hawks	4–2	St. Louis Blues	11–8–2	24
22	November 26	Montreal Canadiens	2–3	Chicago Black Hawks	12–8–2	26
23	November 29	Detroit Red Wings	3–8	Chicago Black Hawks	13–8–2	28

December

Game	Date	Visitor	Score	Home	Record	Points
24	December 2	Chicago Black Hawks	2–3	Pittsburgh Penguins	13–9–2	28
25	December 3	Pittsburgh Penguins	2–4	Chicago Black Hawks	14–9–2	30
26	December 6	Los Angeles Kings	0–6	Chicago Black Hawks	15–9–2	32
27	December 10	Minnesota North Stars	1–5	Chicago Black Hawks	16–9–2	34
28	December 12	Chicago Black Hawks	5–1	Vancouver Canucks	17–9–2	36
29	December 13	Chicago Black Hawks	1–3	Los Angeles Kings	17–10–2	36
30	December 15	Chicago Black Hawks	9–4	California Golden Seals	18–10–2	38
31	December 17	Los Angeles Kings	0–2	Chicago Black Hawks	19–10–2	40
32	December 20	Philadelphia Flyers	1–4	Chicago Black Hawks	20–10–2	42
33	December 23	Chicago Black Hawks	3–5	Toronto Maple Leafs	20–11–2	42
34	December 24	Toronto Maple Leafs	1–5	Chicago Black Hawks	21–11–2	44
35	December 27	St. Louis Blues	5–3	Chicago Black Hawks	21–12–2	44
36	December 28	Chicago Black Hawks	2–8	Buffalo Sabres	21–13–2	44
37	December 31	Buffalo Sabres	2–4	Chicago Black Hawks	22–13–2	46

January

Game	Date	Visitor	Score	Home	Record	Points
38	January 3	Pittsburgh Penguins	5–3	Chicago Black Hawks	22–14–2	46
39	January 6	Chicago Black Hawks	2–0	Minnesota North Stars	23–14–2	48
40	January 7	Boston Bruins	4–5	Chicago Black Hawks	24–14–2	50
41	January 10	Chicago Black Hawks	2–5	Atlanta Flames	24–15–2	50
42	January 13	Philadelphia Flyers	3–2	Chicago Black Hawks	24–16–2	50
43	January 14	California Golden Seals	6–6	Chicago Black Hawks	24–16–3	51
44	January 17	Chicago Black Hawks	6–4	Detroit Red Wings	25–16–3	53
45	January 18	Chicago Black Hawks	1–5	Buffalo Sabres	25–17–3	53
46	January 20	Chicago Black Hawks	3–3	Minnesota North Stars	25–17–4	54
47	January 21	Pittsburgh Penguins	3–9	Chicago Black Hawks	26–17–4	56
48	January 24	Vancouver Canucks	3–3	Chicago Black Hawks	26–17–5	57
49	January 27	Chicago Black Hawks	4–2	Boston Bruins	27–17–5	59
50	January 28	Minnesota North Stars	1–5	Chicago Black Hawks	28–17–5	61

February

Game	Date	Visitor	Score	Home	Record	Points
51	February 1	Chicago Black Hawks	5–3	New York Islanders	29–17–5	63
52	February 3	Chicago Black Hawks	2–2	Philadelphia Flyers	29–17–6	64
53	February 4	St. Louis Blues	2–5	Chicago Black Hawks	30–17–6	66
54	February 7	Buffalo Sabres	1–2	Chicago Black Hawks	31–17–6	68
55	February 9	Chicago Black Hawks	4–3	Atlanta Flames	32–17–6	70
56	February 11	Philadelphia Flyers	2–7	Chicago Black Hawks	33–17–6	72
57	February 14	New York Islanders	2–4	Chicago Black Hawks	34–17–6	74
58	February 17	Chicago Black Hawks	3–4	St. Louis Blues	34–18–6	74
59	February 18	Boston Bruins	4–1	Chicago Black Hawks	34–19–6	74
60	February 21	Montreal Canadiens	4–2	Chicago Black Hawks	34–20–6	74
61	February 24	Chicago Black Hawks	0–2	Pittsburgh Penguins	34–21–6	74
62	February 25	Atlanta Flames	2–4	Chicago Black Hawks	35–21–6	76
63	February 27	Chicago Black Hawks	5–3	New York Islanders	36–21–6	78
64	February 28	Chicago Black Hawks	3–3	New York Rangers	36–21–7	79

March

Game	Date	Visitor	Score	Home	Record	Points
65	March 3	Chicago Black Hawks	3–3	Toronto Maple Leafs	36–21–8	80
66	March 4	Chicago Black Hawks	0–4	Boston Bruins	36–22–8	80
67	March 8	Chicago Black Hawks	1–4	Los Angeles Kings	36–23–8	80
68	March 10	Chicago Black Hawks	4–2	Vancouver Canucks	37–23–8	82
69	March 11	Chicago Black Hawks	5–1	California Golden Seals	38–23–8	84
70	March 14	New York Rangers	2–4	Chicago Black Hawks	39–23–8	86
71	March 17	Chicago Black Hawks	2–3	Atlanta Flames	39–24–8	86
72	March 18	Detroit Red Wings	2–0	Chicago Black Hawks	39–25–8	86
73	March 21	Buffalo Sabres	2–6	Chicago Black Hawks	40–25–8	88
74	March 24	Atlanta Flames	0–7	Chicago Black Hawks	41–25–8	90
75	March 25	Montreal Canadiens	5–6	Chicago Black Hawks	42–25–8	92
76	March 28	Chicago Black Hawks	3–4	Montreal Canadiens	42–26–8	92
77	March 31	Chicago Black Hawks	2–4	Detroit Red Wings	42–27–8	92

April

Game	Date	Visitor	Score	Home	Record	Points
78	April 1	Toronto Maple Leafs	4–4	Chicago Black Hawks	42–27–9	93

Legend: Win (2 points) Loss (0 points) Tie (1 point)

=== Playoffs ===
1973 Stanley Cup playoffs
Quarterfinals vs. (W4) St. Louis Blues – Black Hawks win 4–1

Game	Date	Visitor	Score	Home	Series
1	April 4	St. Louis Blues	1–7	Chicago Black Hawks	1–0
2	April 5	St. Louis Blues	0–1	Chicago Black Hawks	2–0
3	April 7	Chicago Black Hawks	5–2	St. Louis Blues	3–0
4	April 8	Chicago Black Hawks	3–5	St. Louis Blues	3–1
5	April 10	St. Louis Blues	1–6	Chicago Black Hawks	4–1

Semifinals vs. (E3) New York Rangers – Black Hawks win 4–1

Game	Date	Visitor	Score	Home	Series
1	April 12	New York Rangers	4–1	Chicago Black Hawks	0–1
2	April 15	New York Rangers	4–5	Chicago Black Hawks	1–1
3	April 17	Chicago Black Hawks	2–1	New York Rangers	2–1
4	April 19	Chicago Black Hawks	3–1	New York Rangers	3–1
5	April 24	New York Rangers	1–4	Chicago Black Hawks	4–1

Stanley Cup Finals vs. (E1) Montreal Canadiens – Canadiens win 4–2

Game	Date	Visitor	Score	Home	Series
1	April 29	Chicago Black Hawks	3–8	Montreal Canadiens	0–1
2	May 1	Chicago Black Hawks	1–4	Montreal Canadiens	0–2
3	May 3	Montreal Canadiens	4–7	Chicago Black Hawks	1–2
4	May 6	Montreal Canadiens	4–0	Chicago Black Hawks	1–3
5	May 8	Chicago Black Hawks	8–7	Montreal Canadiens	2–3
6	May 10	Montreal Canadiens	6–4	Chicago Black Hawks	2–4

Legend: Win Loss

== Season stats ==
=== Scoring leaders ===
Player	GP	G	A	Pts	PIM
Jim Pappin	76	41	51	92	82
Dennis Hull	78	39	51	90	27
Pit Martin	78	29	61	90	30
Stan Mikita	57	27	56	83	32
Cliff Koroll	77	33	24	57	38

=== Goaltending ===
Player	GP	TOI	W	L	T	GA	SO	GAA
Tony Esposito	56	3340	32	17	7	140	5	2.51
Gary Smith	28	1340	10	10	2	79	0	3.54

== Playoff stats ==
=== Scoring leaders ===
Player	GP	G	A	Pts	PIM
Dennis Hull	16	9	15	24	4
Stan Mikita	15	7	13	20	8
Pat Stapleton	16	2	15	17	10
Pit Martin	15	10	6	16	6
Jim Pappin	16	8	7	15	24

=== Goaltending ===
Player	GP	TOI	W	L	GA	SO	GAA
Tony Esposito	15	895	10	5	46	1	3.08
Gary Smith	2	65	0	1	5	0	4.62

== Draft picks ==
Chicago's draft picks at the 1972 NHL amateur draft held at the Queen Elizabeth Hotel in Montreal.

Round	#	Player	Nationality	College/Junior/Club team (League)
1	13	Phil Russell	Canada	Edmonton Oil Kings (WCHL)
2	29	Brian Ogilvie	Canada	Edmonton Oil Kings (WCHL)
3	45	Mike Veisor	Canada	Peterborough Petes (OHA)
4	61	Tom Peluso	United States	University of Denver (NCAA)
5	77	Rejean Giroux	Canada	Quebec Remparts (QMJHL)
6	93	Rob Palmer	United States	University of Denver (NCAA)
7	109	Terry Smith	Canada	Edmonton Oil Kings (WCHL)
8	125	Billy Reay	Canada	University of Wisconsin (NCAA)
9	141	Gary Donaldson	Canada	Victoria Cougars (WCHL)

== Sources ==
- Hockey-Reference
- Rauzulu's Street
- Goalies Archive
- HockeyDB
- National Hockey League Guide & Record Book 2007
