= 1974–75 Phoenix Roadrunners season =

Professional hockey season

1974–75 Phoenix Roadrunners
- Division: 4th West
- 1974–75 record: 39–31–8
- Home record: 23–11–5
- Road record: 16–20–3
- Goals for: 300
- Goals against: 265

Team information
- Coach: Sandy Hucul
- Captain: Bob Barlow
- Alternate captains: Gerry Odrowski; Murray Keogan; Robbie Ftorek
- Arena: Arizona Veterans Memorial Coliseum

Team leaders
- Goals: Michel Cormier (36)
- Assists: Dennis Sobchuk (45)
- Points: Dennis Sobchuk (77)
- Penalty minutes: John Hughes (201)
- Wins: Gary Kurt (25)
- Goals against average: Jack Norris (3.27)

The 1974–75 Phoenix Roadrunners season was the Phoenix Roadrunners first season of operation in the World Hockey Association (WHA). The Roadrunners qualified for the playoffs, losing in the first round to the Quebec Nordiques.

== Regular season ==
=== Final standings ===
Western Division	GP	W	L	T	Pts	GF	GA	PIM
Houston Aeros	78	53	25	0	106	369	247	1257
San Diego Mariners	78	43	31	4	90	326	268	1058
Minnesota Fighting Saints	78	42	33	3	87	308	279	1233
Phoenix Roadrunners	78	39	31	8	86	300	265	1388
Michigan Stags / Baltimore Blades	78	21	53	4	46	205	341	1104

== Schedule and results ==
1974–75 regular season
October

Game	Result	Date	Score	Opponent	Record
1	W	October 16, 1974	8–2	San Diego Mariners (1974–75)	1–0–0
2	W	October 18, 1974	6–4	Houston Aeros (1974–75)	2–0–0
3	T	October 20, 1974	4–4	Cleveland Crusaders (1974–75)	2–0–1
4	L	October 24, 1974	1–2	@ San Diego Mariners (1974–75)	2–1–1
5	L	October 26, 1974	1–4	@ Quebec Nordiques (1974–75)	2–2–1
6	L	October 28, 1974	3–7	@ Toronto Toros (1974–75)	2–3–1
7	L	October 30, 1974	5–6 OT	@ Winnipeg Jets (1974–75)	2–4–1

November

Game	Result	Date	Score	Opponent	Record
8	L	November 2, 1974	2–8	@ Houston Aeros (1974–75)	2–5–1
9	W	November 5, 1974	3–0	@ Indianapolis Racers (1974–75)	3–5–1
10	W	November 9, 1974	4–2	@ New England Whalers (1974–75)	4–5–1
11	L	November 10, 1974	4–10	@ Minnesota Fighting Saints (1974–75)	4–6–1
12	L	November 14, 1974	1–2 OT	Cleveland Crusaders (1974–75)	4–7–1
13	W	November 16, 1974	6–3	New England Whalers (1974–75)	5–7–1
14	L	November 21, 1974	1–2	@ Michigan Stags/Baltimore Blades (1974–75)	5–8–1
15	W	November 24, 1974	3–1	@ Winnipeg Jets (1974–75)	6–8–1
16	W	November 26, 1974	6–4	@ Houston Aeros (1974–75)	7–8–1
17	L	November 27, 1974	2–4	Chicago Cougars (1974–75)	7–9–1
18	T	November 29, 1974	4–4	Toronto Toros (1974–75)	7–9–2

December

Game	Result	Date	Score	Opponent	Record
19	L	December 1, 1974	3–4	@ Minnesota Fighting Saints (1974–75)	7–10–2
20	W	December 3, 1974	5–4 OT	@ San Diego Mariners (1974–75)	8–10–2
21	L	December 4, 1974	0–2	San Diego Mariners (1974–75)	8–11–2
22	W	December 6, 1974	3–1	Edmonton Oilers (1974–75)	9–11–2
23	L	December 8, 1974	2–5	Toronto Toros (1974–75)	9–12–2
24	W	December 10, 1974	4–2	@ Chicago Cougars (1974–75)	10–12–2
25	W	December 12, 1974	4–2	Vancouver Blazers (1974–75)	11–12–2
26	W	December 14, 1974	4–3	Minnesota Fighting Saints (1974–75)	12–12–2
27	W	December 18, 1974	5–3	Vancouver Blazers (1974–75)	13–12–2
28	W	December 20, 1974	7–2	Michigan Stags/Baltimore Blades (1974–75)	14–12–2
29	W	December 22, 1974	4–2	@ Winnipeg Jets (1974–75)	15–12–2
30	L	December 26, 1974	2–3	Winnipeg Jets (1974–75)	15–13–2
31	W	December 28, 1974	3–2 OT	Cleveland Crusaders (1974–75)	16–13–2
32	W	December 30, 1974	6–3	@ Quebec Nordiques (1974–75)	17–13–2
33	T	December 31, 1974	1–1	@ Michigan Stags/Baltimore Blades (1974–75)	17–13–3

January

Game	Result	Date	Score	Opponent	Record
34	L	January 2, 1975	2–3	@ Vancouver Blazers (1974–75)	17–14–3
35	T	January 3, 1975	3–3	@ Edmonton Oilers (1974–75)	17–14–4
36	W	January 5, 1975	2–1	@ Indianapolis Racers (1974–75)	18–14–4
37	W	January 7, 1975	3–2	@ Toronto Toros (1974–75)	19–14–4
38	T	January 9, 1975	1–1	New England Whalers (1974–75)	19–14–5
39	L	January 11, 1975	4–6	@ Houston Aeros (1974–75)	19–15–5
40	L	January 12, 1975	2–4	@ Cleveland Crusaders (1974–75)	19–16–5
41	L	January 14, 1975	2–5	@ Chicago Cougars (1974–75)	19–17–5
42	T	January 15, 1975	5–5	Toronto Toros (1974–75)	19–17–6
43	L	January 17, 1975	1–7	Edmonton Oilers (1974–75)	19–18–6
44	W	January 18, 1975	3–1	Edmonton Oilers (1974–75)	20–18–6
45	W	January 22, 1975	8–5	Chicago Cougars (1974–75)	21–18–6
46	W	January 24, 1975	4–1	New England Whalers (1974–75)	22–18–6
47	W	January 26, 1975	6–0	Indianapolis Racers (1974–75)	23–18–6
48	W	January 28, 1975	3–1	@ Indianapolis Racers (1974–75)	24–18–6
49	L	January 29, 1975	2–6	@ Cleveland Crusaders (1974–75)	24–19–6
50	L	January 30, 1975	3–5	Winnipeg Jets (1974–75)	24–20–6

February

Game	Result	Date	Score	Opponent	Record
51	W	February 1, 1975	8–1	Michigan Stags/Baltimore Blades (1974–75)	25–20–6
52	W	February 5, 1975	9–2	San Diego Mariners (1974–75)	26–20–6
53	W	February 7, 1975	4–1	Minnesota Fighting Saints (1974–75)	27–20–6
54	L	February 8, 1975	3–4 OT	Quebec Nordiques (1974–75)	27–21–6
55	W	February 9, 1975	6–4	@ Edmonton Oilers (1974–75)	28–21–6
56	L	February 12, 1975	4–5	@ Vancouver Blazers (1974–75)	28–22–6
57	L	February 13, 1975	3–5	Quebec Nordiques (1974–75)	28–23–6
58	W	February 16, 1975	5–4	@ Edmonton Oilers (1974–75)	29–23–6
59	L	February 18, 1975	0–7	@ San Diego Mariners (1974–75)	29–24–6
60	W	February 22, 1975	3–1	@ Michigan Stags/Baltimore Blades (1974–75)	30–24–6
61	L	February 27, 1975	2–7	Houston Aeros (1974–75)	30–25–6

March

Game	Result	Date	Score	Opponent	Record
62	W	March 1, 1975	12–2	Indianapolis Racers (1974–75)	31–25–6
63	W	March 2, 1975	5–0	Chicago Cougars (1974–75)	32–25–6
64	W	March 5, 1975	6–3	Quebec Nordiques (1974–75)	33–25–6
65	W	March 7, 1975	7–4	Winnipeg Jets (1974–75)	34–25–6
66	L	March 9, 1975	3–4	@ Vancouver Blazers (1974–75)	34–26–6
67	L	March 11, 1975	4–7	@ Toronto Toros (1974–75)	34–27–6
68	T	March 13, 1975	5–5	@ New England Whalers (1974–75)	34–27–7
69	W	March 18, 1975	7–3	@ Chicago Cougars (1974–75)	35–27–7
70	L	March 19, 1975	4–5	@ Cleveland Crusaders (1974–75)	35–28–7
71	W	March 22, 1975	4–2	Vancouver Blazers (1974–75)	36–28–7
72	W	March 23, 1975	5–3	Indianapolis Racers (1974–75)	37–28–7
73	W	March 26, 1975	2–1	Houston Aeros (1974–75)	38–28–7
74	T	March 28, 1975	2–2	Minnesota Fighting Saints (1974–75)	38–28–8
75	L	March 30, 1975	5–6 OT	@ Quebec Nordiques (1974–75)	38–29–8

April

Game	Result	Date	Score	Opponent	Record
76	L	April 1, 1975	3–5	@ New England Whalers (1974–75)	38–30–8
77	W	April 4, 1975	2–1	@ Minnesota Fighting Saints (1974–75)	39–30–8
78	L	April 5, 1975	6–7 OT	Michigan Stags/Baltimore Blades (1974–75)	39–31–8

Legend: Win (2 points) Loss (0 points) Tie (1 point)

== Playoffs ==
1975 Avco Cup playoffs
Quarterfinals vs. Quebec Nordiques – Nordiques win 4–1

Game	Date	Visitor	Score	Home	Series
1	April 8	Phoenix Roadrunners	2–5	Quebec Nordiques	0–1
2	April 10	Phoenix Roadrunners	2–6	Quebec Nordiques	0–2
3	April 12	Quebec Nordiques	3–0	Phoenix Roadrunners	0–3
4	April 15	Quebec Nordiques	5–6	Phoenix Roadrunners	1–3
5	April 17	Phoenix Roadrunners	2–4	Quebec Nordiques	1–4

Legend: Win Loss

== Player statistics ==
=== Players ===
Regular season
Player	Position	GP	G	A	Pts	PIM	+/-	PPG	SHG	GWG
Dennis Sobchuk	C	78	32	45	77	36	35	4	0	0
Michel Cormier	LW	78	36	38	74	26	18	5	1	0
Jim Boyd	C	76	26	44	70	18	29	7	3	0
John Gray	RW	75	35	33	68	107	28	4	0	0
Robbie Ftorek	C/LW	53	31	37	68	29	49	4	0	0
Murray Keogan	C	78	35	29	64	68	-12	11	0	0
Don Borgeson	LW	74	29	28	57	38	20	3	2	0
Gerry Odrowski	D	77	5	38	43	77	23	2	0	0
John Hughes	D	72	4	25	29	201	49	2	0	0
Cam Connor	RW	57	9	19	28	168	20	0	0	0
Peter McNamee	D	55	9	19	28	77	5	1	0	0
Jim Niekamp	D	71	2	26	28	66	12	1	0	0
Bob Barlow	LW	51	6	20	26	8	-9	0	0	0
Hugh Harris	C	22	10	10	20	15	2	1	0	0
Bob Mowat	RW	53	9	10	19	34	-4	0	1	0
John Migneault	LW	47	6	13	19	16	-4	1	0	0
Wendell Bennett	D	67	4	15	19	92	5	0	0	0
Al McLeod	D	77	3	16	19	98	12	0	0	0
Mike Stevens	D	70	2	16	18	69	15	0	0	0
Howie Young	D/RW	30	3	12	15	44	-2	1	0	0
Dave Gorman	RW	13	3	5	8	10	0	0	0	0
Rick Newell	D	25	0	4	4	39	3	0	0	0
Gary Kurt	G	47	0	2	2	2	0	0	0	0
Gene Sobchuk	LW/C	3	1	0	1	0	0	1	0	0
Garry Lariviere	D	4	0	1	1	28	0	0	0	0
Jack Norris	G	33	0	1	1	2	0	0	0	0

Avco Cup playoffs
Player	Position	GP	G	A	Pts	PIM	PPG	SHG	GWG
Robbie Ftorek	C/LW	5	2	5	7	2	0	0	0
Dennis Sobchuk	C	5	4	1	5	2	0	0	0
John Gray	RW	5	2	3	5	12	0	0	0
Al McLeod	D	5	0	4	4	4	0	0	0
Wendell Bennett	D	5	1	2	3	6	0	0	0
Jim Boyd	C	5	1	1	2	2	0	0	0
Gerry Odrowski	D	5	0	2	2	0	0	0	0
Michel Cormier	LW	5	1	0	1	2	0	0	1
Peter McNamee	D	5	1	0	1	2	0	0	0
Don Borgeson	LW	5	0	1	1	2	0	0	0
Murray Keogan	C	5	0	1	1	0	0	0	0
Rick Newell	D	5	0	1	1	2	0	0	0
Mike Stevens	D	5	0	1	1	0	0	0	0
Cam Connor	RW	5	0	0	0	0	0	0	0
Gary Kurt	G	4	0	0	0	0	0	0	0
Garry Lariviere	D	1	0	0	0	0	0	0	0
John Migneault	LW	1	0	0	0	0	0	0	0
Bob Mowat	RW	4	0	0	0	0	0	0	0
Jim Niekamp	D	5	0	0	0	0	0	0	0
Jack Norris	G	2	0	0	0	0	0	0	0
Gene Sobchuk	LW/C	5	0	0	0	0	0	0	0

=== Goaltending ===
Regular season
Player	MIN	GP	W	L	T	GA	GAA	SO
Gary Kurt	2841	47	25	16	4	156	3.29	2
Jack Norris	1962	33	14	15	4	107	3.27	1
Team:	4803	78	39	31	8	263	3.29	3

Avco Cup playoffs
Player	MIN	GP	W	L	GA	GAA	SO
Gary Kurt	207	4	1	2	12	3.48	0
Jack Norris	100	2	0	2	10	6.00	0
Team:	307	5	1	4	22	4.30	0

Note: Pos = Position; GP = Games played; G = Goals; A = Assists; Pts = Points; +/- = plus/minus; PIM = Penalty minutes; PPG = Power-play goals; SHG = Short-handed goals; GWG = Game-winning goals
MIN = Minutes played; W = Wins; L = Losses; T = Ties; GA = Goals-against; GAA = Goals-against average; SO = Shutouts;

== Draft picks ==
Phoenix's draft picks at the 1974 WHA Amateur Draft.

Round	#	Player	Nationality	College/Junior/Club team (League)
WHA Secret Amateur Draft
1	1	Greg Joly (D)	Canada	Regina Pats (WCHL)
2	16	Brian Kinsella (RW)	Canada	Oshawa Generals (OHA)
2	23	Brad Winton (C)	Canada	Toronto Marlboros (OHA)
WHA Amateur Draft
1	5	Dennis Olmstead (C)	Canada	University of Wisconsin (WCHA)
2	16	Dave Gorman (RW)	Canada	St. Catharines Black Hawks (OHA)
3	31	Jim Clarke (D)	Canada	Toronto Marlboros (OHA)
4	46	Bruce Aberhart (G)	Canada	London Knights (OHA)
5	61	Gordon Buynak (D)	United States	Kingston Canadians (OHA)
6	75	Robbie Watt (F)	Canada	Flin Flon Bombers (WCHL)
7	90	Andy Spruce (LW)	Canada	London Knights (OHA)
8	105	Steve Short (D)	United States	St. Paul Vulcans (MidJHL)
9	120	John Taft (D)	United States	University of Wisconsin (WCHA)
10	135	Dan Mandryk (F)	Canada	Calgary Centennials (WCHL)
11	148	Chuck Luksa (D)	Canada	University of Toronto (OUAA)
12	161	Marc Gaudreault (D)	Canada	Lake Superior State University (CCHA)
13	174	Kim Gellert (C)	Canada	Lake Superior State University (CCHA)
14	185	Ron Hawkshaw (F)	Canada	University of Waterloo (OUAA)

== See also ==
- 1974–75 WHA season
