= 1974–75 Chicago Cougars season =

World Hockey Association team season

1974–75 Chicago Cougars
- Division: 3rd Eastern
- 1974–75 record: 30–47–1
- Home record: 18–20–1
- Road record: 12–27–0
- Goals for: 261
- Goals against: 312

Team information
- Coach: Pat Stapleton
- Captain: Jan Popiel
- Alternate captains: Rosaire Paiement
- Arena: International Amphitheatre

Team leaders
- Goals: Gary MacGregor (42)
- Assists: Rosaire Paiement (48)
- Points: Gary MacGregor (76)
- Penalty minutes: Darryl Maggs (137)
- Wins: Dave Dryden (18)
- Goals against average: Dave Dryden (3.87)

The 1974–75 Chicago Cougars season was the Chicago Cougars third and final season of operation in the World Hockey Association (WHA). The Cougars finished third in the East, but did not have enough points to qualify for the playoffs.

== Regular season ==
=== Final standings ===
Eastern Division	GP	W	L	T	Pts	GF	GA	PIM
New England Whalers	78	43	30	5	91	274	279	867
Cleveland Crusaders	78	35	40	3	73	236	258	1273
Chicago Cougars	78	30	47	1	61	261	312	1086
Indianapolis Racers	78	18	57	3	39	216	338	970

== Schedule and results ==
1974–75 regular season
October

Game	Result	Date	Score	Opponent	Record
1	W	October 18, 1974	2–1	@ Vancouver Blazers (1974–75)	1–0–0
2	L	October 20, 1974	1–3	@ Vancouver Blazers (1974–75)	1–1–0
3	L	October 27, 1974	5–6 OT	@ Minnesota Fighting Saints (1974–75)	1–2–0
4	L	October 29, 1974	2–4	Houston Aeros (1974–75)	1–3–0
5	L	October 30, 1974	0–1	@ Houston Aeros (1974–75)	1–4–0
6	L	October 31, 1974	3–4	@ San Diego Mariners (1974–75)	1–5–0

November

Game	Result	Date	Score	Opponent	Record
7	W	November 2, 1974	4–3 OT	Toronto Toros (1974–75)	2–5–0
8	L	November 5, 1974	4–5	Vancouver Blazers (1974–75)	2–6–0
9	L	November 10, 1974	0–7	Toronto Toros (1974–75)	2–7–0
10	L	November 12, 1974	2–4	San Diego Mariners (1974–75)	2–8–0
11	L	November 14, 1974	2–4	@ Michigan Stags/Baltimore Blades (1974–75)	2–9–0
12	L	November 16, 1974	2–6	@ Houston Aeros (1974–75)	2–10–0
13	L	November 19, 1974	4–5	New England Whalers (1974–75)	2–11–0
14	W	November 20, 1974	6–4	Indianapolis Racers (1974–75)	3–11–0
15	W	November 22, 1974	5–3	Michigan Stags/Baltimore Blades (1974–75)	4–11–0
16	L	November 23, 1974	2–3	@ New England Whalers (1974–75)	4–12–0
17	L	November 24, 1974	5–9	New England Whalers (1974–75)	4–13–0
18	W	November 27, 1974	4–2	@ Phoenix Roadrunners (1974–75)	5–13–0
19	W	November 28, 1974	3–2	@ San Diego Mariners (1974–75)	6–13–0
20	W	November 30, 1974	7–5	@ Minnesota Fighting Saints (1974–75)	7–13–0

December

Game	Result	Date	Score	Opponent	Record
21	W	December 5, 1974	5–3	@ Indianapolis Racers (1974–75)	8–13–0
22	W	December 7, 1974	9–3	Toronto Toros (1974–75)	9–13–0
23	L	December 8, 1974	2–5	@ Winnipeg Jets (1974–75)	9–14–0
24	L	December 10, 1974	2–4	Phoenix Roadrunners (1974–75)	9–15–0
25	W	December 14, 1974	6–0	Michigan Stags/Baltimore Blades (1974–75)	10–15–0
26	L	December 17, 1974	1–6	Quebec Nordiques (1974–75)	10–16–0
27	W	December 20, 1974	5–3	@ Quebec Nordiques (1974–75)	11–16–0
28	L	December 21, 1974	0–3	Edmonton Oilers (1974–75)	11–17–0
29	L	December 22, 1974	2–5	@ Toronto Toros (1974–75)	11–18–0
30	L	December 27, 1974	2–4	@ Toronto Toros (1974–75)	11–19–0
31	W	December 28, 1974	5–3	Minnesota Fighting Saints (1974–75)	12–19–0
32	L	December 29, 1974	3–4	@ Michigan Stags/Baltimore Blades (1974–75)	12–20–0
33	W	December 31, 1974	4–3	@ Cleveland Crusaders (1974–75)	13–20–0

January

Game	Result	Date	Score	Opponent	Record
34	T	January 4, 1975	4–4	Indianapolis Racers (1974–75)	13–20–1
35	W	January 5, 1975	3–2	@ Edmonton Oilers (1974–75)	14–20–1
36	L	January 7, 1975	2–4	Minnesota Fighting Saints (1974–75)	14–21–1
37	W	January 10, 1975	5–2	Michigan Stags/Baltimore Blades (1974–75)	15–21–1
38	W	January 14, 1975	5–2	Phoenix Roadrunners (1974–75)	16–21–1
39	L	January 15, 1975	5–7	@ New England Whalers (1974–75)	16–22–1
40	W	January 18, 1975	3–2	Minnesota Fighting Saints (1974–75)	17–22–1
41	L	January 19, 1975	2–5	Quebec Nordiques (1974–75)	17–23–1
42	L	January 22, 1975	5–8	@ Phoenix Roadrunners (1974–75)	17–24–1
43	L	January 23, 1975	2–4	@ Indianapolis Racers (1974–75)	17–25–1
44	L	January 25, 1975	4–6	@ Quebec Nordiques (1974–75)	17–26–1
45	L	January 26, 1975	3–5	Vancouver Blazers (1974–75)	17–27–1
46	W	January 28, 1975	4–3	Cleveland Crusaders (1974–75)	18–27–1
47	L	January 30, 1975	2–5	Quebec Nordiques (1974–75)	18–28–1

February

Game	Result	Date	Score	Opponent	Record
48	L	February 1, 1975	5–6	Houston Aeros (1974–75)	18–29–1
49	L	February 2, 1975	3–4 OT	@ Edmonton Oilers (1974–75)	18–30–1
50	L	February 5, 1975	2–4	@ Vancouver Blazers (1974–75)	18–31–1
51	W	February 8, 1975	6–3	Winnipeg Jets (1974–75)	19–31–1
52	L	February 9, 1975	2–3	@ Winnipeg Jets (1974–75)	19–32–1
53	L	February 10, 1975	1–4	@ Indianapolis Racers (1974–75)	19–33–1
54	L	February 12, 1975	3–5	@ Cleveland Crusaders (1974–75)	19–34–1
55	W	February 15, 1975	5–3	@ Michigan Stags/Baltimore Blades (1974–75)	20–34–1
56	L	February 16, 1975	3–6	Winnipeg Jets (1974–75)	20–35–1
57	W	February 17, 1975	6–5 OT	Indianapolis Racers (1974–75)	21–35–1
58	W	February 20, 1975	4–3 OT	@ Toronto Toros (1974–75)	22–35–1
59	W	February 23, 1975	2–1	Vancouver Blazers (1974–75)	23–35–1
60	W	February 25, 1975	4–3 OT	Edmonton Oilers (1974–75)	24–35–1
61	W	February 26, 1975	4–3	@ New England Whalers (1974–75)	25–35–1

March

Game	Result	Date	Score	Opponent	Record
62	L	March 1, 1975	2–4	@ Houston Aeros (1974–75)	25–36–1
63	L	March 2, 1975	0–5	@ Phoenix Roadrunners (1974–75)	25–37–1
64	L	March 9, 1975	5–7	@ Quebec Nordiques (1974–75)	25–38–1
65	L	March 11, 1975	1–5	Edmonton Oilers (1974–75)	25–39–1
66	L	March 14, 1975	4–5	Houston Aeros (1974–75)	25–40–1
67	W	March 16, 1975	4–2	San Diego Mariners (1974–75)	26–40–1
68	W	March 17, 1975	3–2	Cleveland Crusaders (1974–75)	27–40–1
69	L	March 18, 1975	3–7	Phoenix Roadrunners (1974–75)	27–41–1
70	W	March 20, 1975	4–2	@ San Diego Mariners (1974–75)	28–41–1
71	L	March 22, 1975	2–4	Winnipeg Jets (1974–75)	28–42–1
72	L	March 23, 1975	3–4	@ Winnipeg Jets (1974–75)	28–43–1
73	L	March 25, 1975	4–6	San Diego Mariners (1974–75)	28–44–1
74	L	March 26, 1975	3–4	@ Minnesota Fighting Saints (1974–75)	28–45–1
75	L	March 30, 1975	6–7	@ Cleveland Crusaders (1974–75)	28–46–1

April

Game	Result	Date	Score	Opponent	Record
76	W	April 1, 1975	3–2 OT	Cleveland Crusaders (1974–75)	29–46–1
77	W	April 4, 1975	3–1	New England Whalers (1974–75)	30–46–1
78	L	April 6, 1975	3–6	@ Edmonton Oilers (1974–75)	30–47–1

Legend: Win (2 points) Loss (0 points) Tie (1 point)

== Player statistics ==
Regular season
Scoring

Player	Pos	GP	G	A	Pts	PIM	+/-	PPG	SHG	GWG
Gary MacGregor	C	78	42	34	76	26	3	8	0	0
Rosaire Paiement	C	78	26	48	74	97	0	3	0	0
Frank Rochon	LW	69	27	29	56	19	8	5	0	0
Mark Lomenda	RW	69	16	33	49	21	-2	2	0	0
Bob Liddington	LW	78	23	18	41	27	-31	5	0	0
Jan Popiel	LW	60	18	22	40	74	-1	3	0	0
Ralph Backstrom	C	70	15	24	39	28	-28	6	0	0
Peter Mara	C	67	17	21	38	16	7	1	0	0
Pat Stapleton	D	68	4	30	34	38	-9	2	0	0
Darryl Maggs	D	77	6	27	33	137				
Larry Mavety	D	57	10	22	32	126	-3	3	0	0
Rick Morris	LW	78	15	13	28	110	-14	0	2	0
Duke Harris	RW	54	9	19	28	18	-13	4	0	0
Brian Coates	LW	35	12	9	21	26	-6	1	0	0
Bryon Baltimore	D	77	8	12	20	110	-24	0	0	0
Dunc McCallum	D	31	0	10	10	24	-6	0	0	0
Don Gordon	RW	42	4	5	9	10	-14	1	0	0
Rod Zaine	C	68	3	6	9	16	-6	0	1	0
Jim Watson	D	57	2	6	8	31	-8	0	0	0
Lou Angotti	C/RW	26	2	5	7	9	-1	0	1	0
Joe Hardy	C	17	1	6	7	8	0	0	0	0
Dick Proceviat	D	11	0	3	3	11	-6	0	0	0
Jim Benzelock	RW	10	0	2	2	14	0	0	0	0
Keith Kokkola	D	33	0	2	2	69	-4	0	0	0
Dave Walter	C	6	1	0	1	2	0	0	0	0
Dave Dryden	G	45	0	1	1	4	0	0	0	0
Rich Coutu	G	1	0	0	0	0	0	0	0	0
Richard Dumas	G	1	0	0	0	0	0	0	0	0
Cam Newton	G	32	0	0	0	0	0	0	0	0
Jim Pritchard	D	2	0	0	0	0	0	0	0	0

Goaltending

Player	MIN	GP	W	L	T	GA	GAA	SO
Dave Dryden	2728	45	18	26	1	176	3.87	1
Cam Newton	1905	32	12	20	0	126	3.97	0
Rich Coutu	60	1	0	1	0	5	5.00	0
Richard Dumas	1	1	0	0	0	0	0.00	0
Team:	4694	78	30	47	1	307	3.92	1

Note: Pos = Position; GP = Games played; G = Goals; A = Assists; Pts = Points; +/- = plus/minus; PIM = Penalty minutes; PPG = Power-play goals; SHG = Short-handed goals; GWG = Game-winning goals
MIN = Minutes played; W = Wins; L = Losses; T = Ties; GA = Goals-against; GAA = Goals-against average; SO = Shutouts;

== Draft picks ==
Chicago's draft picks at the 1974 WHA Amateur Draft.

Round	#	Player	Nationality	College/Junior/Club team (League)
WHA Secret Amateur Draft
1	8	Paul McIntosh (D)	Canada	Peterborough Petes (OHA)
WHA Amateur Draft
1	10	Gary MacGregor (C)	Canada	Cornwall Royals (QMJHL)
2	25	Tim Burke (D)	United States	University of New Hampshire (ECAC)
3	33	Mark Lomenda (RW)	Canada	Victoria Cougars (WCHL)
3	39	Garry Lariviere (D)	Canada	St. Catharines Black Hawks (OHA)
4	55	Paul Evans (C)	Canada	Kitchener Rangers (OHA)
5	69	Scott Jessee (RW)	United States	Michigan Tech (WCHA)
6	84	Emile DeMoissac (LW)	Canada	New Westminster Bruins (WCHL)
7	99	John Shewchuk (F)	United States	St. Paul Vulcans (MidJHL)
8	114	Mark Trivett (F)	Canada	Cornwall Royals (QMJHL)
9	129	Bob Chase (F)	Canada	Cornwall Royals (QMJHL)
10	142	Darrell Traer	Canada	Thunder Bay Hurricanes (MJHL)
11	156	Jim Murray (G)	United States	Michigan Americans (SOJHL)
12	169	Michel Dubois (D)	Canada	Chicoutimi Sagueneens (QMJHL)
13	180	Reggie Lemelin (G)	Canada	Sherbrooke Castors (QMJHL)

== See also ==
- 1974–75 WHA season
