= 1974–75 New England Whalers season =

World Hockey Association team season

1974–75 New England Whalers
- Division: 1st East
- 1974–75 record: 43–30–5
- Home record: 28–8–3
- Road record: 15–22–2
- Goals for: 274
- Goals against: 279

Team information
- General manager: Jack Kelley
- Coach: Ron Ryan (40–28–5); Jack Kelley (3–2–0)
- Captain: Ted Green
- Alternate captains: Jim Dorey; Larry Pleau
- Arena: Eastern States Coliseum (13 games); Hartford Civic Center (26 games)

Team leaders
- Goals: Tom Webster (40)
- Assists: John French (41)
- Points: Wayne Carleton (74)
- Penalty minutes: Nick Fotiu (144)
- Wins: Al Smith (33)
- Goals against average: Christer Abrahamsson (3.24)

The 1974–75 New England Whalers season was the Whalers' third season of play. It was also the first season the franchise played away from Boston, Massachusetts on a fulltime basis. They played the first thirteen home games in West Springfield, Massachusetts at the Eastern States Coliseum before the team moved to the newly-opened Hartford Civic Center in Hartford, Connecticut. Ryan was replaced by Kelley before the 1975 WHA playoffs started; the Whalers lost to the Minnesota Fighting Saints in the WHA Quarterfinals in six games.

== Regular season ==
=== Final standings ===
Eastern Division	GP	W	L	T	Pts	GF	GA	PIM
New England Whalers	78	43	30	5	91	274	279	867
Cleveland Crusaders	78	35	40	3	73	236	258	1273
Chicago Cougars	78	30	47	1	61	261	312	1086
Indianapolis Racers	78	18	57	3	39	216	338	970

== Schedule and results ==
1974–75 regular season
October

Game	Result	Date	Score	Opponent	Record
1	L	October 15, 1974	2–6	@ Toronto Toros (1974–75)	0–1–0
2	W	October 19, 1974	2–1 OT	Michigan Stags/Baltimore Blades (1974–75)	1–1–0
3	W	October 23, 1974	5–4	Houston Aeros (1974–75)	2–1–0
4	W	October 26, 1974	6–1	Indianapolis Racers (1974–75)	3–1–0
5	W	October 30, 1974	5–2	Toronto Toros (1974–75)	4–1–0
6	W	October 31, 1974	6–1	@ Indianapolis Racers (1974–75)	5–1–0

November

Game	Result	Date	Score	Opponent	Record
7	W	November 2, 1974	4–2	Quebec Nordiques (1974–75)	6–1–0
8	W	November 8, 1974	3–0	San Diego Mariners (1974–75)	7–1–0
9	L	November 9, 1974	2–4	Phoenix Roadrunners (1974–75)	7–2–0
10	L	November 12, 1974	1–6	@ Houston Aeros (1974–75)	7–3–0
11	W	November 14, 1974	7–2	@ San Diego Mariners (1974–75)	8–3–0
12	L	November 16, 1974	3–6	@ Phoenix Roadrunners (1974–75)	8–4–0
13	W	November 17, 1974	6–1	@ Michigan Stags/Baltimore Blades (1974–75)	9–4–0
14	W	November 19, 1974	5–4	@ Chicago Cougars (1974–75)	10–4–0
15	W	November 21, 1974	4–0	@ Indianapolis Racers (1974–75)	11–4–0
16	W	November 23, 1974	3–2	Chicago Cougars (1974–75)	12–4–0
17	W	November 24, 1974	9–5	@ Chicago Cougars (1974–75)	13–4–0
18	W	November 26, 1974	5–4 OT	@ Quebec Nordiques (1974–75)	14–4–0
19	L	November 29, 1974	1–5	@ Vancouver Blazers (1974–75)	14–5–0

December

Game	Result	Date	Score	Opponent	Record
20	L	December 1, 1974	4–8	@ Edmonton Oilers (1974–75)	14–6–0
21	L	December 3, 1974	1–2	@ Michigan Stags/Baltimore Blades (1974–75)	14–7–0
22	W	December 4, 1974	3–2	@ Cleveland Crusaders (1974–75)	15–7–0
23	L	December 5, 1974	1–9	@ Quebec Nordiques (1974–75)	15–8–0
24	W	December 7, 1974	6–3	Indianapolis Racers (1974–75)	16–8–0
25	W	December 11, 1974	3–1	Minnesota Fighting Saints (1974–75)	17–8–0
26	W	December 14, 1974	9–4	Quebec Nordiques (1974–75)	18–8–0
27	W	December 15, 1974	4–3	@ Winnipeg Jets (1974–75)	19–8–0
28	T	December 17, 1974	2–2	@ Michigan Stags/Baltimore Blades (1974–75)	19–8–1
29	L	December 20, 1974	0–3	@ Cleveland Crusaders (1974–75)	19–9–1
30	L	December 21, 1974	3–5	Houston Aeros (1974–75)	19–10–1
31	L	December 22, 1974	1–2	@ Indianapolis Racers (1974–75)	19–11–1
32	L	December 27, 1974	3–6	@ Minnesota Fighting Saints (1974–75)	19–12–1
33	L	December 28, 1974	1–6	@ Houston Aeros (1974–75)	19–13–1

January

Game	Result	Date	Score	Opponent	Record
34	W	January 3, 1975	5–3	@ Toronto Toros (1974–75)	20–13–1
35	W	January 4, 1975	4–3 OT	Vancouver Blazers (1974–75)	21–13–1
36	L	January 5, 1975	3–9	@ Minnesota Fighting Saints (1974–75)	21–14–1
37	L	January 7, 1975	3–5	@ San Diego Mariners (1974–75)	21–15–1
38	T	January 9, 1975	1–1	@ Phoenix Roadrunners (1974–75)	21–15–2
39	W	January 11, 1975	4–3 OT	San Diego Mariners (1974–75)	22–15–2
40	W	January 15, 1975	7–5	Chicago Cougars (1974–75)	23–15–2
41	W	January 17, 1975	2–1	Toronto Toros (1974–75)	24–15–2
42	L	January 18, 1975	2–8	@ Quebec Nordiques (1974–75)	24–16–2
43	L	January 19, 1975	1–3	Minnesota Fighting Saints (1974–75)	24–17–2
44	L	January 24, 1975	1–4	@ Phoenix Roadrunners (1974–75)	24–18–2
45	L	January 25, 1975	2–6	@ San Diego Mariners (1974–75)	24–19–2
46	W	January 27, 1975	2–0	Cleveland Crusaders (1974–75)	25–19–2
47	W	January 29, 1975	4–3	Michigan Stags/Baltimore Blades (1974–75)	26–19–2
48	W	January 31, 1975	4–2	Michigan Stags/Baltimore Blades (1974–75)	27–19–2

February

Game	Result	Date	Score	Opponent	Record
49	W	February 7, 1975	5–4 OT	@ Winnipeg Jets (1974–75)	28–19–2
50	L	February 8, 1975	1–4	@ Vancouver Blazers (1974–75)	28–20–2
51	L	February 9, 1975	1–5	@ Vancouver Blazers (1974–75)	28–21–2
52	T	February 12, 1975	2–2	Edmonton Oilers (1974–75)	28–21–3
53	W	February 14, 1975	4–3 OT	Indianapolis Racers (1974–75)	29–21–3
54	L	February 18, 1975	3–6	@ Edmonton Oilers (1974–75)	29–22–3
55	W	February 21, 1975	4–2	@ Edmonton Oilers (1974–75)	30–22–3
56	W	February 23, 1975	2–1 OT	@ Winnipeg Jets (1974–75)	31–22–3
57	W	February 25, 1975	3–2	Vancouver Blazers (1974–75)	32–22–3
58	L	February 26, 1975	3–4	Chicago Cougars (1974–75)	32–23–3
59	W	February 27, 1975	5–2	Minnesota Fighting Saints (1974–75)	33–23–3

March

Game	Result	Date	Score	Opponent	Record
60	T	March 1, 1975	4–4	Cleveland Crusaders (1974–75)	33–23–4
61	W	March 2, 1975	4–1	Vancouver Blazers (1974–75)	34–23–4
62	L	March 5, 1975	3–5	@ Minnesota Fighting Saints (1974–75)	34–24–4
63	W	March 8, 1975	5–4	@ Houston Aeros (1974–75)	35–24–4
64	W	March 11, 1975	6–2	Winnipeg Jets (1974–75)	36–24–4
65	T	March 13, 1975	5–5	Phoenix Roadrunners (1974–75)	36–24–5
66	W	March 15, 1975	6–2	Edmonton Oilers (1974–75)	37–24–5
67	W	March 16, 1975	7–5	Toronto Toros (1974–75)	38–24–5
68	L	March 19, 1975	1–6	San Diego Mariners (1974–75)	38–25–5
69	L	March 21, 1975	3–6	Winnipeg Jets (1974–75)	38–26–5
70	L	March 22, 1975	3–5	Houston Aeros (1974–75)	38–27–5
71	W	March 25, 1975	5–4	Edmonton Oilers (1974–75)	39–27–5
72	W	March 27, 1975	5–3	Cleveland Crusaders (1974–75)	40–27–5
73	L	March 29, 1975	3–9	Winnipeg Jets (1974–75)	40–28–5
74	W	March 30, 1975	4–3	@ Toronto Toros (1974–75)	41–28–5

April

Game	Result	Date	Score	Opponent	Record
75	W	April 1, 1975	5–3	Phoenix Roadrunners (1974–75)	42–28–5
76	W	April 3, 1975	4–1	Quebec Nordiques (1974–75)	43–28–5
77	L	April 4, 1975	1–3	@ Chicago Cougars (1974–75)	43–29–5
78	L	April 5, 1975	2–5	@ Cleveland Crusaders (1974–75)	43–30–5

Legend: Win (2 points) Loss (0 points) Tie (1 point)

== Playoffs ==
Game Two at Hartford on April 11 went to overtime and the Whalers won in the extra period 3–2. The game was famous for a huge brawl early in the second period that involved both benches and lasted nearly five full minutes; the primary fighters were Nick Fotiu, Bill Butters, and Jack Carlson that raged on the ice and even in the penalty boxes.

1975 Avco Cup playoffs
Division Quarterfinals vs. Minnesota Fighting Saints – Fighting Saints win 4–2

Game	Date	Visitor	Score	Home	Series
1	April 9	Minnesota Fighting Saints	6–5	New England Whalers	0–1
2	April 11	Minnesota Fighting Saints	2 – 3 OT	New England Whalers	1–1
3	April 13	New England Whalers	3–8	Minnesota Fighting Saints	1–2
4	April 15	New England Whalers	5–2	Minnesota Fighting Saints	2–2
5	April 18	Minnesota Fighting Saints	4–0	New England Whalers	2–3
6	April 19	New England Whalers	1–6	Minnesota Fighting Saints	2–4

Legend: Win Loss

== Draft picks ==
New England's draft picks at the 1974 WHA Amateur Draft.

Round	#	Player	Nationality	College/Junior/Club team (League)
WHA Secret Amateur Draft
1	14	Peter Sturgeon (LW)	Canada	Kitchener Rangers (OHA)
2	29	Michel Deziel (LW)	Canada	Sorel Black Hawks (QMJHL)
WHA Amateur Draft
1	13	Tim Young (F)	Canada	Ottawa 67's (OHA)
2	28	Mike Eruzione (LW)	United States	Boston University (ECAC)
3	43	Peter Brown (D)	United States	Boston University (ECAC)
4	58	Dick Lamby (D)	United States	Salem State College (ECAC-2)
5	72	Don McLean (D)	Canada	Sudbury Wolves (OHA)
6	87	Joe Rando (D)	United States	University of New Hampshire (ECAC)
7	102	Brian Walsh (RW)	United States	University of Notre Dame (WCHA)
8	117	John Nazar (LW)	Canada	Cornwall Royals (QMJHL)
9	132	Warren Miller (F)	United States	University of Minnesota (WCHA)
10	145	Tony White (F)	Canada	Kitchener Rangers (OHA)
11	158	Robbie Moore (G)	Canada	Michigan Americans (SOJHL)
12	171	Cliff Cox (F)	Canada	University of New Hampshire (ECAC)
13	182	Dave Staffen (F)	Canada	Ottawa 67's (OHA)
14	190	Peter Tighe (D)	Canada	London Knights (OHA)
15	195	Brian Durocher (G)	United States	Springfield Olympics (NEJHL)
16	199	Colin Ahern (C)	United States	Tyngsboro Huskies
17	203	Dwane Byers (F)	Canada	Sherbrooke Castors (QMJHL)

== See also ==
- 1974–75 WHA season
