= 1974–75 Cleveland Crusaders season =

World Hockey Association team season

1974–75 Cleveland Crusaders
- Division: 2nd Eastern
- 1974–75 record: 35–40–3
- Home record: 23–15–1
- Road record: 12–25–2
- Goals for: 236
- Goals against: 258

Team information
- Coach: John Hanna (14–19–1), Jack Vivian (21–21–2)
- Captain: Paul Shmyr
- Arena: Coliseum at Richfield

Team leaders
- Goals: Rich LeDuc (35)
- Assists: Ron Ward (32)
- Points: Rich LeDuc (66)
- Penalty minutes: Steve Cardwell (127)
- Wins: Gerry Cheevers (26)
- Goals against average: Bob Whidden (3.23)

The 1974–75 Cleveland Crusaders season was the Cleveland Crusaders third season of operation in the World Hockey Association. It was the Crusaders' first season in the new Coliseum at Richfield. The Crusaders made the playoffs, losing in the quarter-finals to the Houston Aeros.

== Regular season ==
=== Final standings ===
Eastern Division	GP	W	L	T	Pts	GF	GA	PIM
New England Whalers	78	43	30	5	91	274	279	867
Cleveland Crusaders	78	35	40	3	73	236	258	1273
Chicago Cougars	78	30	47	1	61	261	312	1086
Indianapolis Racers	78	18	57	3	39	216	338	970

== Schedule and results ==
1974–75 regular season
October

Game	Result	Date	Score	Opponent	Record
1	W	October 19, 1974	3–1	@ Minnesota Fighting Saints (1974–75)	1–0–0
2	T	October 20, 1974	4–4	@ Phoenix Roadrunners (1974–75)	1–0–1
3	L	October 22, 1974	2–5	@ San Diego Mariners (1974–75)	1–1–1
4	L	October 23, 1974	1–4	@ Vancouver Blazers (1974–75)	1–2–1
5	W	October 31, 1974	4–2	@ Michigan Stags/Baltimore Blades (1974–75)	2–2–1

November

Game	Result	Date	Score	Opponent	Record
6	L	November 2, 1974	2–4	Edmonton Oilers (1974–75)	2–3–1
7	W	November 8, 1974	2–1	@ Vancouver Blazers (1974–75)	3–3–1
8	L	November 10, 1974	1–4	@ Edmonton Oilers (1974–75)	3–4–1
9	W	November 14, 1974	2–1 OT	@ Phoenix Roadrunners (1974–75)	4–4–1
10	W	November 15, 1974	5–3	@ San Diego Mariners (1974–75)	5–4–1
11	L	November 19, 1974	5–6	Toronto Toros (1974–75)	5–5–1
12	L	November 22, 1974	2–3	@ Quebec Nordiques (1974–75)	5–6–1
13	W	November 24, 1974	3–1	Quebec Nordiques (1974–75)	6–6–1
14	W	November 27, 1974	5–4 OT	Winnipeg Jets (1974–75)	7–6–1
15	W	November 29, 1974	4–2	Indianapolis Racers (1974–75)	8–6–1
16	W	November 30, 1974	5–4	@ Houston Aeros (1974–75)	9–6–1

December

Game	Result	Date	Score	Opponent	Record
17	L	December 4, 1974	2–3	New England Whalers (1974–75)	9–7–1
18	W	December 7, 1974	3–1	San Diego Mariners (1974–75)	10–7–1
19	L	December 10, 1974	3–4	Vancouver Blazers (1974–75)	10–8–1
20	L	December 12, 1974	2–5	@ Quebec Nordiques (1974–75)	10–9–1
21	L	December 13, 1974	6–7 OT	@ Toronto Toros (1974–75)	10–10–1
22	L	December 15, 1974	1–2	@ Vancouver Blazers (1974–75)	10–11–1
23	L	December 17, 1974	3–8	@ San Diego Mariners (1974–75)	10–12–1
24	L	December 19, 1974	0–1	@ Michigan Stags/Baltimore Blades (1974–75)	10–13–1
25	W	December 20, 1974	3–0	New England Whalers (1974–75)	11–13–1
26	L	December 22, 1974	0–3	Houston Aeros (1974–75)	11–14–1
27	W	December 23, 1974	4–1	@ Toronto Toros (1974–75)	12–14–1
28	W	December 27, 1974	4–3	Quebec Nordiques (1974–75)	13–14–1
29	L	December 28, 1974	2–3 OT	@ Phoenix Roadrunners (1974–75)	13–15–1
30	L	December 29, 1974	0–6	@ Minnesota Fighting Saints (1974–75)	13–16–1
31	L	December 31, 1974	3–4	Chicago Cougars (1974–75)	13–17–1

January

Game	Result	Date	Score	Opponent	Record
32	L	January 1, 1975	2–6	@ Minnesota Fighting Saints (1974–75)	13–18–1
33	W	January 2, 1975	4–1	Indianapolis Racers (1974–75)	14–18–1
34	L	January 4, 1975	0–2	San Diego Mariners (1974–75)	14–19–1
35	L	January 5, 1975	3–4	Toronto Toros (1974–75)	14–20–1
36	T	January 7, 1975	4–4	Winnipeg Jets (1974–75)	14–20–2
37	W	January 10, 1975	6–4	Vancouver Blazers (1974–75)	15–20–2
38	W	January 12, 1975	4–2	Phoenix Roadrunners (1974–75)	16–20–2
39	L	January 15, 1975	2–4	Minnesota Fighting Saints (1974–75)	16–21–2
40	L	January 16, 1975	2–4	@ Indianapolis Racers (1974–75)	16–22–2
41	W	January 18, 1975	2–1	Michigan Stags/Baltimore Blades (1974–75)	17–22–2
42	L	January 19, 1975	4–9	@ Winnipeg Jets (1974–75)	17–23–2
43	W	January 23, 1975	5–3	@ Quebec Nordiques (1974–75)	18–23–2
44	W	January 25, 1975	2–1	Michigan Stags/Baltimore Blades (1974–75)	19–23–2
45	L	January 27, 1975	0–2	@ New England Whalers (1974–75)	19–24–2
46	L	January 28, 1975	3–4	@ Chicago Cougars (1974–75)	19–25–2
47	W	January 29, 1975	6–2	Phoenix Roadrunners (1974–75)	20–25–2
48	W	January 31, 1975	2–0	@ Edmonton Oilers (1974–75)	21–25–2

February

Game	Result	Date	Score	Opponent	Record
49	L	February 2, 1975	3–4	Quebec Nordiques (1974–75)	21–26–2
50	W	February 5, 1975	3–2	Winnipeg Jets (1974–75)	22–26–2
51	W	February 6, 1975	4–0	@ Michigan Stags/Baltimore Blades (1974–75)	23–26–2
52	L	February 7, 1975	1–4	@ Toronto Toros (1974–75)	23–27–2
53	L	February 9, 1975	1–4	Houston Aeros (1974–75)	23–28–2
54	W	February 12, 1975	5–3	Chicago Cougars (1974–75)	24–28–2
55	W	February 14, 1975	3–2	San Diego Mariners (1974–75)	25–28–2
56	L	February 15, 1975	1–5	@ Winnipeg Jets (1974–75)	25–29–2
57	L	February 17, 1975	1–2	Minnesota Fighting Saints (1974–75)	25–30–2
58	L	February 19, 1975	3–5	Minnesota Fighting Saints (1974–75)	25–31–2
59	W	February 22, 1975	4–3	Toronto Toros (1974–75)	26–31–2
60	L	February 23, 1975	0–6	@ Indianapolis Racers (1974–75)	26–32–2
61	L	February 26, 1975	5–9	@ Houston Aeros (1974–75)	26–33–2

March

Game	Result	Date	Score	Opponent	Record
62	T	March 1, 1975	4–4	@ New England Whalers (1974–75)	26–33–3
63	W	March 4, 1975	3–1	@ Edmonton Oilers (1974–75)	27–33–3
64	L	March 5, 1975	2–4	@ Winnipeg Jets (1974–75)	27–34–3
65	W	March 8, 1975	6–5	@ Indianapolis Racers (1974–75)	28–34–3
66	L	March 12, 1975	0–2	Michigan Stags/Baltimore Blades (1974–75)	28–35–3
67	W	March 14, 1975	3–0	Edmonton Oilers (1974–75)	29–35–3
68	L	March 16, 1975	1–2	Houston Aeros (1974–75)	29–36–3
69	L	March 17, 1975	2–3	@ Chicago Cougars (1974–75)	29–37–3
70	W	March 19, 1975	5–4	Phoenix Roadrunners (1974–75)	30–37–3
71	W	March 22, 1975	5–1	Edmonton Oilers (1974–75)	31–37–3
72	W	March 26, 1975	4–2	Vancouver Blazers (1974–75)	32–37–3
73	L	March 27, 1975	3–5	@ New England Whalers (1974–75)	32–38–3
74	W	March 29, 1975	7–5	Indianapolis Racers (1974–75)	33–38–3
75	W	March 30, 1975	7–6	Chicago Cougars (1974–75)	34–38–3

April

Game	Result	Date	Score	Opponent	Record
76	L	April 1, 1975	2–3 OT	@ Chicago Cougars (1974–75)	34–39–3
77	L	April 2, 1975	6–7	@ Houston Aeros (1974–75)	34–40–3
78	W	April 5, 1975	5–2	New England Whalers (1974–75)	35–40–3

Legend: Win (2 points) Loss (0 points) Tie (1 point)

== Playoffs ==
1975 Avco Cup playoffs
Quarterfinals vs. Houston Aeros – Aeros win 4–1

Game	Date	Visitor	Score	Home	Series
1	April 10	Cleveland Crusaders	5–8	Houston Aeros	0–1
2	April 12	Cleveland Crusaders	3–5	Houston Aeros	0–2
3	April 13	Houston Aeros	1–3	Cleveland Crusaders	1–2
4	April 15	Houston Aeros	7–2	Cleveland Crusaders	1–3
5	April 17	Cleveland Crusaders	1–3	Houston Aeros	1–4

Legend: Win Loss

== Player statistics ==
=== Players ===
Regular season
Player	Position	GP	G	A	Pts	PIM	+/-	PPG	SHG	GWG
Rich Leduc	C	78	35	31	66	122	12	5	0	0
Al McDonough	RW	78	34	30	64	27	-11	12	0	0
Ron Ward	C	73	30	32	62	18	7	5	0	0
Jim Harrison	C	60	20	22	42	106	-8	6	0	0
Gary Jarrett	LW	77	17	24	41	70	8	1	0	0
Gerry Pinder	LW	74	13	28	41	71	-6	4	0	0
Skip Krake	C	71	15	23	38	108	9	1	0	0
Grant Erickson	LW	78	12	15	27	24	2	0	2	0
Russ Walker	RW	66	14	11	25	80	16	0	0	0
Terry Holbrook	RW	78	10	13	23	7	-10	0	0	0
Tom Edur	D	61	3	20	23	28	-4	0	0	0
Steve Cardwell	LW	75	9	13	22	127	-3	0	1	0
Ray Clearwater	D	66	4	18	22	51	4	0	0	0
Paul Shmyr	D	49	7	14	21	103	11	3	0	0
Wayne Muloin	D	78	4	17	21	65	-6	0	1	0
Larry Hillman	D	77	0	16	16	83	-6	0	0	0
John Stewart	C	59	4	7	11	8	5	0	0	0
Wayne Hillman	D	60	2	9	11	37	3	0	0	0
Ron F. Anderson	D	39	0	9	9	10	7	0	0	0
Robbie Neale	C	9	1	3	4	4	0	0	0	0
Ron Buchanan	C	4	2	0	2	2	0	1	0	0
Gerry Cheevers	G	52	0	1	1	59	0	0	0	0
Paul Baxter	D	5	0	0	0	37	1	0	0	0
Bob Whidden	G	29	0	0	0	2	0	0	0	0

Avco Cup playoffs
Player	Position	GP	G	A	Pts	PIM	PPG	SHG	GWG
Gerry Pinder	LW	5	3	1	4	6	0	0	0
Larry Hillman	D	5	1	3	4	0	0	0	1
Al McDonough	RW	5	2	1	3	2	0	0	0
Paul Shmyr	D	5	2	1	3	15	0	0	0
Jim Harrison	C	5	1	2	3	4	0	0	0
Tom Edur	D	5	2	0	2	0	0	0	0
Ray Clearwater	D	4	1	1	2	0	0	0	0
Skip Krake	C	5	1	1	2	0	0	0	0
Wayne Hillman	D	5	0	2	2	2	0	0	0
Rich Leduc	C	5	0	2	2	2	0	0	0
Ron Ward	C	5	0	2	2	2	0	0	0
Russ Walker	RW	5	1	0	1	17	0	0	0
Steve Cardwell	LW	5	0	1	1	14	0	0	0
Terry Holbrook	RW	5	0	1	1	0	0	0	0
Gary Jarrett	LW	5	0	1	1	0	0	0	0
Wayne Muloin	D	5	0	1	1	4	0	0	0
Gerry Cheevers	G	5	0	0	0	0	0	0	0
Grant Erickson	LW	5	0	0	0	0	0	0	0
John Stewart	C	1	0	0	0	0	0	0	0

=== Goaltending ===
Player	MIN	GP	W	L	T	GA	GAA	SO
Gerry Cheevers	3076	52	26	24	2	167	3.26	4
Bob Whidden	1654	29	9	16	1	89	3.23	0
Team:	4730	78	35	40	3	256	3.25	4

Avco Cup playoffs
Player	MIN	GP	W	L	GA	GAA	SO
Gerry Cheevers	300	5	1	4	23	4.60	0
Team:	300	5	1	4	23	4.60	0

Note: Pos = Position; GP = Games played; G = Goals; A = Assists; Pts = Points; +/- = plus/minus; PIM = Penalty minutes; PPG = Power-play goals; SHG = Short-handed goals; GWG = Game-winning goals
MIN = Minutes played; W = Wins; L = Losses; T = Ties; GA = Goals-against; GAA = Goals-against average; SO = Shutouts;

== Draft picks ==
Cleveland's draft picks at the 1974 WHA Amateur Draft.

Round	#	Player	Nationality	College/Junior/Club team (League)
WHA Secret Amateur Draft
1	10	Doug Risebrough (F)	Canada	Kitchener Rangers (OHA)
1	13	Bruce Affleck (D)	Canada	University of Denver (WCHA)
2	25	John Stewart (C)	Canada	Bowling Green State University (CCHA)
WHA Amateur Draft
1	11	Paul Baxter (D)	Canada	Winnipeg Clubs (WCHL)
2	26	Charlie Simmer (F)	Canada	Sault Ste. Marie Greyhounds (OHA)
4	49	Jamie Hislop (F)	Canada	University of New Hampshire (ECAC)
5	70	Mike Thompson (D)	Canada	Victoria Cougars (WCHL)
6	85	Tom Lindskog (D)	Canada	University of Michigan (WCHA)
7	100	Harvey Stewart (G)	Canada	Flin Flon Bombers (WCHL)
8	115	Steve Colp (C)	Canada	Michigan Americans (SOJHL)
9	130	Jack Brownschidle (D)	United States	University of Notre Dame (WCHA)
10	143	Serge Gamelin (RW)	Canada	Sorel Black Hawks (QMJHL)
11	157	Glen McLeod (D)	Canada	Sudbury Wolves (OHA)
12	170	Doug Allan (G)	Canada	New Westminster Bruins (WCHL)
13	181	Gordon Stewart (F)	Canada	Kamloops Chiefs (WCHL)

== See also ==
- 1974–75 WHA season
