= 1974–75 Minnesota Fighting Saints season =

World Hockey Association team season

1974–75 Minnesota Fighting Saints
- Division: 3rd Western
- 1974–75 record: 42–33–3
- Home record: 26–13–0
- Road record: 16–20–3
- Goals for: 308
- Goals against: 279

Team information
- Coach: Harry Neale
- Captain: Ted Hampson
- Alternate captains: Mike McMahon; John Arbour; Wayne Connelly
- Arena: St. Paul Civic Center

Team leaders
- Goals: Mike Walton (48)
- Assists: Mike Walton (45)
- Points: Mike Walton (93)
- Penalty minutes: Gord Gallant (203)
- Wins: John Garrett (30)
- Goals against average: John Garrett (3.28)

== Regular season ==
=== Final standings ===
Western Division	GP	W	L	T	Pts	GF	GA	PIM
Houston Aeros	78	53	25	0	106	369	247	1257
San Diego Mariners	78	43	31	4	90	326	268	1058
Minnesota Fighting Saints	78	42	33	3	87	308	279	1233
Phoenix Roadrunners	78	39	31	8	86	300	265	1388
Michigan Stags / Baltimore Blades	78	21	53	4	46	205	341	1104

== Schedule and results ==
1974–75 regular season
October

Game	Result	Date	Score	Opponent	Record
1	L	October 19, 1974	1–3	Cleveland Crusaders (1974–75)	0–1–0
2	L	October 22, 1974	2–11	@ Toronto Toros (1974–75)	0–2–0
3	W	October 24, 1974	3–2	@ Indianapolis Racers (1974–75)	1–2–0
4	L	October 26, 1974	2–3	@ Houston Aeros (1974–75)	1–3–0
5	W	October 27, 1974	6–5 OT	Chicago Cougars (1974–75)	2–3–0
6	L	October 29, 1974	3–4 OT	@ Michigan Stags/Baltimore Blades (1974–75)	2–4–0

November

Game	Result	Date	Score	Opponent	Record
7	W	November 2, 1974	6–3	Michigan Stags/Baltimore Blades (1974–75)	3–4–0
8	L	November 5, 1974	4–6	@ Winnipeg Jets (1974–75)	3–5–0
9	L	November 9, 1974	4–7	Toronto Toros (1974–75)	3–6–0
10	W	November 10, 1974	10–4	Phoenix Roadrunners (1974–75)	4–6–0
11	L	November 13, 1974	5–8	Houston Aeros (1974–75)	4–7–0
12	W	November 17, 1974	7–1	@ Quebec Nordiques (1974–75)	5–7–0
13	L	November 20, 1974	1–3	@ Winnipeg Jets (1974–75)	5–8–0
14	L	November 23, 1974	3–5	San Diego Mariners (1974–75)	5–9–0
15	L	November 24, 1974	2–3	@ Michigan Stags/Baltimore Blades (1974–75)	5–10–0
16	W	November 26, 1974	6–2	@ Toronto Toros (1974–75)	6–10–0
17	L	November 30, 1974	5–7	Chicago Cougars (1974–75)	6–11–0

December

Game	Result	Date	Score	Opponent	Record
18	W	December 1, 1974	4–3	Phoenix Roadrunners (1974–75)	7–11–0
19	W	December 4, 1974	6–3	@ Quebec Nordiques (1974–75)	8–11–0
20	W	December 6, 1974	4–2	Winnipeg Jets (1974–75)	9–11–0
21	L	December 8, 1974	2–4	@ Vancouver Blazers (1974–75)	9–12–0
22	W	December 10, 1974	4–2	@ Toronto Toros (1974–75)	10–12–0
23	L	December 11, 1974	1–3	@ New England Whalers (1974–75)	10–13–0
24	L	December 13, 1974	4–5	Edmonton Oilers (1974–75)	10–14–0
25	L	December 14, 1974	3–4	@ Phoenix Roadrunners (1974–75)	10–15–0
26	W	December 15, 1974	6–4	Quebec Nordiques (1974–75)	11–15–0
27	W	December 19, 1974	6–0	@ Indianapolis Racers (1974–75)	12–15–0
28	W	December 20, 1974	6–4	Indianapolis Racers (1974–75)	13–15–0
29	W	December 26, 1974	5–1	@ Edmonton Oilers (1974–75)	14–15–0
30	W	December 27, 1974	6–3	New England Whalers (1974–75)	15–15–0
31	L	December 28, 1974	3–5	@ Chicago Cougars (1974–75)	15–16–0
32	W	December 29, 1974	6–0	Cleveland Crusaders (1974–75)	16–16–0

January

Game	Result	Date	Score	Opponent	Record
33	W	January 1, 1975	6–2	Cleveland Crusaders (1974–75)	17–16–0
34	L	January 3, 1975	1–2	San Diego Mariners (1974–75)	17–17–0
35	W	January 5, 1975	9–3	New England Whalers (1974–75)	18–17–0
36	W	January 7, 1975	4–2	@ Chicago Cougars (1974–75)	19–17–0
37	L	January 9, 1975	2–3	@ Edmonton Oilers (1974–75)	19–18–0
38	W	January 15, 1975	4–2	@ Cleveland Crusaders (1974–75)	20–18–0
39	L	January 18, 1975	2–3	@ Chicago Cougars (1974–75)	20–19–0
40	W	January 19, 1975	3–1	@ New England Whalers (1974–75)	21–19–0
41	L	January 22, 1975	1–2	Vancouver Blazers (1974–75)	21–20–0
42	W	January 24, 1975	7–5	Toronto Toros (1974–75)	22–20–0
43	W	January 26, 1975	2–1	Michigan Stags/Baltimore Blades (1974–75)	23–20–0
44	W	January 30, 1975	6–3	Vancouver Blazers (1974–75)	24–20–0
45	W	January 31, 1975	4–1	Houston Aeros (1974–75)	25–20–0

February

Game	Result	Date	Score	Opponent	Record
46	W	February 2, 1975	5–4 OT	Winnipeg Jets (1974–75)	26–20–0
47	W	February 5, 1975	4–2	Edmonton Oilers (1974–75)	27–20–0
48	T	February 6, 1975	2–2	@ San Diego Mariners (1974–75)	27–20–1
49	L	February 7, 1975	1–4	@ Phoenix Roadrunners (1974–75)	27–21–1
50	L	February 8, 1975	4–8	@ San Diego Mariners (1974–75)	27–22–1
51	L	February 12, 1975	1–3	Houston Aeros (1974–75)	27–23–1
52	L	February 14, 1975	3–7	Quebec Nordiques (1974–75)	27–24–1
53	W	February 16, 1975	5–2	San Diego Mariners (1974–75)	28–24–1
54	W	February 17, 1975	2–1	@ Cleveland Crusaders (1974–75)	29–24–1
55	W	February 19, 1975	5–3	@ Cleveland Crusaders (1974–75)	30–24–1
56	L	February 21, 1975	2–5	@ Indianapolis Racers (1974–75)	30–25–1
57	L	February 23, 1975	4–6	@ Edmonton Oilers (1974–75)	30–26–1
58	T	February 25, 1975	6–6	@ Winnipeg Jets (1974–75)	30–26–2
59	W	February 26, 1975	4–3 OT	Indianapolis Racers (1974–75)	31–26–2
60	L	February 27, 1975	2–5	@ New England Whalers (1974–75)	31–27–2

March

Game	Result	Date	Score	Opponent	Record
61	W	March 1, 1975	4–1	@ Quebec Nordiques (1974–75)	32–27–2
62	W	March 2, 1975	5–3	Toronto Toros (1974–75)	33–27–2
63	W	March 5, 1975	5–3	New England Whalers (1974–75)	34–27–2
64	L	March 9, 1975	5–6 OT	Winnipeg Jets (1974–75)	34–28–2
65	W	March 11, 1975	6–4	@ San Diego Mariners (1974–75)	35–28–2
66	L	March 12, 1975	2–4	@ Vancouver Blazers (1974–75)	35–29–2
67	W	March 18, 1975	5–3	@ Vancouver Blazers (1974–75)	36–29–2
68	W	March 23, 1975	4–2	Edmonton Oilers (1974–75)	37–29–2
69	W	March 25, 1975	5–4	Michigan Stags/Baltimore Blades (1974–75)	38–29–2
70	W	March 26, 1975	4–3	Chicago Cougars (1974–75)	39–29–2
71	T	March 28, 1975	2–2	@ Phoenix Roadrunners (1974–75)	39–29–3
72	L	March 29, 1975	2–8	@ Houston Aeros (1974–75)	39–30–3
73	W	March 30, 1975	5–3	Indianapolis Racers (1974–75)	40–30–3

April

Game	Result	Date	Score	Opponent	Record
74	W	April 1, 1975	5–2	Vancouver Blazers (1974–75)	41–30–3
75	L	April 2, 1975	3–5	Quebec Nordiques (1974–75)	41–31–3
76	L	April 4, 1975	1–2	Phoenix Roadrunners (1974–75)	41–32–3
77	L	April 5, 1975	2–8	@ Houston Aeros (1974–75)	41–33–3
78	W	April 6, 1975	6–5 OT	@ Michigan Stags/Baltimore Blades (1974–75)	42–33–3

Legend: Win (2 points) Loss (0 points) Tie (1 point)

== Playoffs ==
1975 Avco Cup playoffs
Quarterfinals vs. New England Whalers – Fighting Saints win 4–2

Game	Date	Visitor	Score	Home	Series
1	April 9	Minnesota Fighting Saints	6 – 5	New England Whalers	1–0
2	April 11	Minnesota Fighting Saints	2 – 3 OT	New England Whalers	1–1
3	April 13	New England Whalers	3 – 8	Minnesota Fighting Saints	2–1
4	April 15	New England Whalers	5 – 2	Minnesota Fighting Saints	2–2
5	April 18	Minnesota Fighting Saints	4 – 0	New England Whalers	3–2
6	April 19	New England Whalers	1 – 6	Minnesota Fighting Saints	4–2

Semifinals vs. Quebec Nordiques – Nordiques win 4–2

Game	Date	Visitor	Score	Home	Series
1	April 22	Minnesota Fighting Saints	1–4	Quebec Nordiques	0–1
2	April 23	Minnesota Fighting Saints	5–3	Quebec Nordiques	1–1
3	April 26	Quebec Nordiques	6–1	Minnesota Fighting Saints	1–2
4	April 27	Quebec Nordiques	2–4	Minnesota Fighting Saints	2–2
5	April 29	Minnesota Fighting Saints	3–6	Quebec Nordiques	2–3
6	May 1	Quebec Nordiques	4–2	Minnesota Fighting Saints	2–4

Legend: Win Loss

== Player statistics ==
Regular season
Scoring

Player	Pos	GP	G	A	Pts	PIM	+/-	PPG	SHG	GWG
Mike Walton	C	75	48	45	93	33	-11	7	4	3
Wayne Connelly	C	76	38	33	71	16	14	13	1	6
Fran Huck	C	78	22	45	67	26	7	2	3	4
George Morrison	LW	76	31	29	60	30	11	9	0	5
John Arbour	D	70	12	43	55	67	-1	4	0	1
Don Tannahill	LW	72	23	30	53	20	13	2	4	4
Ted Hampson	C	78	17	36	53	6	-8	1	3	2
Mike Antonovich	C	67	24	26	50	20	9	4	0	2
Terry Ball	D	76	8	37	45	36	3	2	0	0
Danny O'Shea	C	76	16	25	41	47	-22	3	0	2
Rick Smith	D	78	9	29	38	112	12	1	0	2
Gary Gambucci	C	68	19	18	37	19	14	2	0	3
Gord Gallant	LW	66	10	13	23	203	-3	1	0	3
Ron Busniuk	RW	73	2	21	23	176	12	0	0	1
Kevin O'Shea	RW	68	10	10	20	42	-9	0	0	3
Mike McMahon	D	64	5	15	20	42	6	1	0	0
Murray Heatley	RW	22	5	9	14	31	0	1	0	0
Jack Carlson	LW	32	5	5	10	85	-1	0	0	0
Joe Robertson	C	11	1	4	5	4	5	0	0	0
Bill Butters	D	24	2	2	4	58	-8	0	0	0
Jim Johnson	C	11	1	3	4	0	-4	0	0	0
Pat Westrum	D	23	0	3	3	48	0	0	0	0
Bob Boyd	D	13	0	0	0	21	0	0	0	0
Curt Brackenbury	RW	7	0	0	0	22	0	0	0	0
Mike Curran	G	26	0	0	0	18	0	0	0	0
John Garrett	G	58	0	0	0	6	0	0	0	0
Jack McCartan	G	2	0	0	0	0	0	0	0	0

Goaltending

Player	MIN	GP	W	L	T	GA	GAA	SO
John Garrett	3294	58	30	23	2	180	3.28	2
Mike Curran	1367	26	11	10	1	90	3.95	0
Jack McCartan	61	2	1	0	0	5	4.92	0
Team:	4722	78	42	33	3	275	3.49	2

Playoffs
Scoring

Player	Pos	GP	G	A	Pts	PIM	PPG	SHG	GWG
Mike Walton	C	12	10	7	17	10	0	0	2
Fran Huck	C	12	3	13	16	6	0	0	2
George Morrison	LW	12	5	9	14	0	0	0	0
Wayne Connelly	C	12	8	4	12	10	0	0	1
Rick Smith	D	12	2	7	9	6	0	0	0
Ted Hampson	C	12	1	7	8	0	0	0	0
Terry Ball	D	12	3	4	7	4	0	0	0
Don Tannahill	LW	10	2	4	6	0	0	0	0
John Arbour	D	12	0	6	6	23	0	0	0
Mike Antonovich	C	12	1	4	5	2	0	0	0
Gary Gambucci	C	12	4	0	4	6	0	0	1
Ron Busniuk	RW	12	2	1	3	63	0	0	0
Jack Carlson	LW	10	1	2	3	41	0	0	0
Curt Brackenbury	RW	12	0	2	2	59	0	0	0
Bill Butters	D	12	1	0	1	21	0	0	0
Gord Gallant	LW	1	1	0	1	0	0	0	0
John Garrett	G	12	0	1	1	2	0	0	0
Mike McMahon	D	7	0	1	1	0	0	0	0
Danny O'Shea	C	11	0	0	0	0	0	0	0
Kevin O'Shea	RW	1	0	0	0	0	0	0	0

Goaltending

Player	MIN	GP	W	L	GA	GAA	SO
John Garrett	726	12	6	6	41	3.39	1
Team:	726	12	6	6	41	3.39	1

Note: Pos = Position; GP = Games played; G = Goals; A = Assists; Pts = Points; +/- = plus/minus; PIM = Penalty minutes; PPG = Power-play goals; SHG = Short-handed goals; GWG = Game-winning goals
MIN = Minutes played; W = Wins; L = Losses; T = Ties; GA = Goals-against; GAA = Goals-against average; SO = Shutouts;

== Draft picks ==
Minnesota's draft picks at the 1974 WHA Amateur Draft.

Round	#	Player	Nationality	College/Junior/Club team (League)
WHA Secret Amateur Draft
2	28	John Paddock (F)	Canada	Brandon Wheat Kings (WCHL)
WHA Amateur Draft
1	14	Bruce Boudreau (C)	Canada	Toronto Marlboros (OHA)
2	29	Rob Laird (LW)	Canada	Regina Pats (WCHL)
3	44	Buzz Schneider (LW)	United States	University of Minnesota (WCHA)
4	59	David Hanson (D)	United States	St. Paul Vulcans (MidJHL)
5	73	Steve Carlson (F)	United States	Marquette Iron Rangers (USHL)
6	88	Al Hillier (C)	Canada	Flin Flon Bombers (WCHL)
7	103	Jack Carlson (F)	United States	Marquette Iron Rangers (USHL)
8	118	Rick Moore (F)	Canada	Montreal Red White and Blue (QMJHL)
9	133	Don Dufek (F)	United States	University of Michigan (WCHA)
10	146	Reg Duncombe	Canada	New Westminster Bruins (WCHL)
11	159	Robin Larson (D)	United States	University of Minnesota (WCHA)
12	172	Joe Baker (D)	United States	St. Paul Vulcans (MidJHL)
13	183	Tony Dorn (D)	United States	Three Rivers Dukes
14	191	Reed Larson (D)	United States	Minnesota Junior Stars (MidJHL)
15	196	Kym Yackel (W)	United States	South St. Paul (Minn. H.S.)
16	200	Dana Decker (LW)	United States	Michigan Americans (SOJHL)
17	204	John Rothstein (RW)	United States	Grand Rapids Jrs.

== See also ==
- 1974–75 WHA season
