= 1974–75 Houston Aeros season =

World Hockey Association team season

1974–75 Houston Aeros
- Avco Cup champions
- Division: 1st Western
- 1974–75 record: 53–25–0
- Home record: 28–11–0
- Road record: 25–14–0
- Goals for: 369
- Goals against: 247

Team information
- Coach: Bill Dineen
- Captain: Ted Taylor
- Alternate captains: Gordie Howe; Gord Labossiere; Poul Popiel
- Arena: Sam Houston Coliseum

Team leaders
- Goals: Frank Hughes (48)
- Assists: Larry Lund (75)
- Points: Larry Lund (108)
- Penalty minutes: John Schella (176)
- Wins: Ron Grahame (33)
- Goals against average: Ron Grahame (3.03)

The 1974–75 Houston Aeros season was the Aeros' third season of operation in the World Hockey Association (WHA). The Aeros qualified first in their division for the playoffs and successfully defended their Avco World Trophy WHA championship.

== Regular season ==
Larry Lund scored 33 goals and had 108 points on the season. Frank Hughes scored a team high 48 goals. Gordie Howe (at the age of 46) scored 34 goals and had 99 points. Mark Howe had 36 goals and 76 points while Marty Howe had 13 goals and 34 points. In total, the Howe family had 83 goals and 209 points combined during the season. The Aeros ranked first in goals scored and goals against en route to 53 wins, a five-game improvement from their Cup winning season the year before.

=== Final standings ===
| Western Division | GP | W | L | T | Pts | GF | GA | PIM |
|---|---|---|---|---|---|---|---|---|
| Houston Aeros | 78 | 53 | 25 | 0 | 106 | 369 | 247 | 1257 |
| San Diego Mariners | 78 | 43 | 31 | 4 | 90 | 326 | 268 | 1058 |
| Minnesota Fighting Saints | 78 | 42 | 33 | 3 | 87 | 308 | 279 | 1233 |
| Phoenix Roadrunners | 78 | 39 | 31 | 8 | 86 | 300 | 265 | 1388 |
| Michigan Stags / Baltimore Blades | 78 | 21 | 53 | 4 | 46 | 205 | 341 | 1104 |

== Schedule and results ==
1974–75 regular season
October: 4–4–0, 8 points (home: 2–0–0; road: 2–4–0)

| Game | Result | Date | Score | Opponent | Record |
|---|---|---|---|---|---|
| 1 | W | October 16, 1974 | 6–0 | @ Vancouver Blazers (1974–75) | 1–0–0 |
| 2 | L | October 18, 1974 | 4–6 | @ Phoenix Roadrunners (1974–75) | 1–1–0 |
| 3 | L | October 19, 1974 | 2–6 | @ San Diego Mariners (1974–75) | 1–2–0 |
| 4 | L | October 22, 1974 | 2–7 | @ Quebec Nordiques (1974–75) | 1–3–0 |
| 5 | L | October 23, 1974 | 4–5 | @ New England Whalers (1974–75) | 1–4–0 |
| 6 | W | October 26, 1974 | 3–2 | Minnesota Fighting Saints (1974–75) | 2–4–0 |
| 7 | W | October 29, 1974 | 4–2 | @ Chicago Cougars (1974–75) | 3–4–0 |
| 8 | W | October 30, 1974 | 1–0 | Chicago Cougars (1974–75) | 4–4–0 |

November: 10–4–0, 20 points (home: 5–4–0; road: 5–0–0)

| Game | Result | Date | Score | Opponent | Record |
|---|---|---|---|---|---|
| 9 | W | November 2, 1974 | 8–2 | Phoenix Roadrunners (1974–75) | 5–4–0 |
| 10 | W | November 5, 1974 | 9–3 | San Diego Mariners (1974–75) | 6–4–0 |
| 11 | L | November 9, 1974 | 4–5 OT | Indianapolis Racers (1974–75) | 6–5–0 |
| 12 | W | November 12, 1974 | 6–1 | New England Whalers (1974–75) | 7–5–0 |
| 13 | W | November 13, 1974 | 8–5 | @ Minnesota Fighting Saints (1974–75) | 8–5–0 |
| 14 | W | November 16, 1974 | 6–2 | Chicago Cougars (1974–75) | 9–5–0 |
| 15 | L | November 17, 1974 | 3–4 | San Diego Mariners (1974–75) | 9–6–0 |
| 16 | W | November 19, 1974 | 10–0 | @ Indianapolis Racers (1974–75) | 10–6–0 |
| 17 | W | November 22, 1974 | 4–1 | @ Vancouver Blazers (1974–75) | 11–6–0 |
| 18 | W | November 23, 1974 | 4–2 | @ Vancouver Blazers (1974–75) | 12–6–0 |
| 19 | W | November 24, 1974 | 4–3 OT | @ Edmonton Oilers (1974–75) | 13–6–0 |
| 20 | L | November 26, 1974 | 4–6 | Phoenix Roadrunners (1974–75) | 13–7–0 |
| 21 | W | November 28, 1974 | 2–0 | Edmonton Oilers (1974–75) | 14–7–0 |
| 22 | L | November 30, 1974 | 4–5 | Cleveland Crusaders (1974–75) | 14–8–0 |

December: 10–3–0, 20 points (home: 5–2–0; road: 5–1–0)

| Game | Result | Date | Score | Opponent | Record |
|---|---|---|---|---|---|
| 23 | W | December 1, 1974 | 7–3 | @ Indianapolis Racers (1974–75) | 15–8–0 |
| 24 | W | December 3, 1974 | 5–4 | @ Toronto Toros (1974–75) | 16–8–0 |
| 25 | W | December 4, 1974 | 3–2 | @ Winnipeg Jets (1974–75) | 17–8–0 |
| 26 | L | December 8, 1974 | 1–2 | @ Quebec Nordiques (1974–75) | 17–9–0 |
| 27 | W | December 11, 1974 | 5–2 | Vancouver Blazers (1974–75) | 18–9–0 |
| 28 | W | December 14, 1974 | 5–3 | Winnipeg Jets (1974–75) | 19–9–0 |
| 29 | L | December 15, 1974 | 3–4 | San Diego Mariners (1974–75) | 19–10–0 |
| 30 | W | December 17, 1974 | 7–2 | Edmonton Oilers (1974–75) | 20–10–0 |
| 31 | L | December 19, 1974 | 1–3 | Vancouver Blazers (1974–75) | 20–11–0 |
| 32 | W | December 21, 1974 | 5–3 | @ New England Whalers (1974–75) | 21–11–0 |
| 33 | W | December 22, 1974 | 3–0 | @ Cleveland Crusaders (1974–75) | 22–11–0 |
| 34 | W | December 28, 1974 | 6–1 | New England Whalers (1974–75) | 23–11–0 |
| 35 | W | December 29, 1974 | 6–3 | Winnipeg Jets (1974–75) | 24–11–0 |

January: 5–5–0, 10 points (home: 4–1–0; road: 1–4–0)

| Game | Result | Date | Score | Opponent | Record |
|---|---|---|---|---|---|
| 36 | W | January 2, 1975 | 6–3 | Michigan Stags/Baltimore Blades (1974–75) | 25–11–0 |
| 37 | W | January 4, 1975 | 5–2 | Michigan Stags/Baltimore Blades (1974–75) | 26–11–0 |
| 38 | W | January 11, 1975 | 6–4 | Phoenix Roadrunners (1974–75) | 27–11–0 |
| 39 | L | January 12, 1975 | 4–7 | Toronto Toros (1974–75) | 27–12–0 |
| 40 | W | January 15, 1975 | 9–2 | Edmonton Oilers (1974–75) | 28–12–0 |
| 41 | L | January 18, 1975 | 4–5 OT | @ San Diego Mariners (1974–75) | 28–13–0 |
| 42 | L | January 24, 1975 | 5–7 | @ Edmonton Oilers (1974–75) | 28–14–0 |
| 43 | W | January 26, 1975 | 3–1 | @ Winnipeg Jets (1974–75) | 29–14–0 |
| 44 | L | January 28, 1975 | 5–7 | @ Edmonton Oilers (1974–75) | 29–15–0 |
| 45 | L | January 31, 1975 | 1–4 | @ Minnesota Fighting Saints (1974–75) | 29–16–0 |

February: 12–4–0, 24 points (home: 4–3–0; road: 8–1–0)

| Game | Result | Date | Score | Opponent | Record |
|---|---|---|---|---|---|
| 46 | W | February 1, 1975 | 6–5 | @ Chicago Cougars (1974–75) | 30–16–0 |
| 47 | W | February 2, 1975 | 5–2 | @ Michigan Stags/Baltimore Blades (1974–75) | 31–16–0 |
| 48 | W | February 4, 1975 | 4–3 OT | @ Indianapolis Racers (1974–75) | 32–16–0 |
| 49 | W | February 5, 1975 | 5–2 | Toronto Toros (1974–75) | 33–16–0 |
| 50 | L | February 6, 1975 | 3–4 | Quebec Nordiques (1974–75) | 33–17–0 |
| 51 | L | February 8, 1975 | 4–6 | Michigan Stags/Baltimore Blades (1974–75) | 33–18–0 |
| 52 | W | February 9, 1975 | 4–1 | @ Cleveland Crusaders (1974–75) | 34–18–0 |
| 53 | W | February 11, 1975 | 5–2 | @ Michigan Stags/Baltimore Blades (1974–75) | 35–18–0 |
| 54 | W | February 12, 1975 | 3–1 | @ Minnesota Fighting Saints (1974–75) | 36–18–0 |
| 55 | L | February 14, 1975 | 3–5 | @ Winnipeg Jets (1974–75) | 36–19–0 |
| 56 | W | February 17, 1975 | 5–3 | @ Quebec Nordiques (1974–75) | 37–19–0 |
| 57 | W | February 19, 1975 | 10–4 | Quebec Nordiques (1974–75) | 38–19–0 |
| 58 | L | February 22, 1975 | 2–4 | Vancouver Blazers (1974–75) | 38–20–0 |
| 59 | W | February 23, 1975 | 5–1 | Toronto Toros (1974–75) | 39–20–0 |
| 60 | W | February 26, 1975 | 9–5 | Cleveland Crusaders (1974–75) | 40–20–0 |
| 61 | W | February 27, 1975 | 7–2 | @ Phoenix Roadrunners (1974–75) | 41–20–0 |

March: 9–4–0, 18 points (home: 6–1–0; road: 3–3–0)

| Game | Result | Date | Score | Opponent | Record |
|---|---|---|---|---|---|
| 62 | W | March 1, 1975 | 4–2 | Chicago Cougars (1974–75) | 42–20–0 |
| 63 | W | March 2, 1975 | 4–3 OT | Indianapolis Racers (1974–75) | 43–20–0 |
| 64 | L | March 6, 1975 | 4–7 | @ San Diego Mariners (1974–75) | 43–21–0 |
| 65 | L | March 8, 1975 | 4–5 | New England Whalers (1974–75) | 43–22–0 |
| 66 | W | March 14, 1975 | 5–4 | @ Chicago Cougars (1974–75) | 44–22–0 |
| 67 | W | March 16, 1975 | 2–1 | @ Cleveland Crusaders (1974–75) | 45–22–0 |
| 68 | L | March 17, 1975 | 4–5 | @ Toronto Toros (1974–75) | 45–23–0 |
| 69 | W | March 19, 1975 | 6–5 | Indianapolis Racers (1974–75) | 46–23–0 |
| 70 | W | March 20, 1975 | 5–3 | Quebec Nordiques (1974–75) | 47–23–0 |
| 71 | W | March 22, 1975 | 5–3 | @ New England Whalers (1974–75) | 48–23–0 |
| 72 | L | March 26, 1975 | 1–2 | @ Phoenix Roadrunners (1974–75) | 48–24–0 |
| 73 | W | March 27, 1975 | 8–0 | Winnipeg Jets (1974–75) | 49–24–0 |
| 74 | W | March 29, 1975 | 8–2 | Minnesota Fighting Saints (1974–75) | 50–24–0 |

April: 3–1–0, 6 points (home: 2–0–0; road: 1–1–0)

| Game | Result | Date | Score | Opponent | Record |
|---|---|---|---|---|---|
| 75 | W | April 2, 1975 | 7–6 | Cleveland Crusaders (1974–75) | 51–24–0 |
| 76 | W | April 5, 1975 | 8–2 | Minnesota Fighting Saints (1974–75) | 52–24–0 |
| 77 | W | April 6, 1975 | 5–2 | @ Toronto Toros (1974–75) | 53–24–0 |
| 78 | L | April 7, 1975 | 2–4 | @ Michigan Stags/Baltimore Blades (1974–75) | 53–25–0 |

Legend: Win (2 points) Loss (0 points) Tie (1 point)

== Playoffs ==
During the playoffs, the Aeros lost only once en route to a second consecutive Avco World Trophy. The Aeros defeated the Cleveland Crusaders 4–1 in the Quarter-finals. The Aeros then defeated the San Diego Mariners 4–0 to advance to the Final. In the Final, the Aeros swept the Quebec Nordiques 4–0.

1975 Avco Cup playoffs
Quarterfinals vs. Cleveland Crusaders – Aeros win 4–1

| Game | Date | Visitor | Score | Home | Series |
|---|---|---|---|---|---|
| 1 | April 10 | Cleveland Crusaders | 5–8 | Houston Aeros | 1–0 |
| 2 | April 12 | Cleveland Crusaders | 3–5 | Houston Aeros | 2–0 |
| 3 | April 13 | Houston Aeros | 1–3 | Cleveland Crusaders | 2–1 |
| 4 | April 15 | Houston Aeros | 7–2 | Cleveland Crusaders | 3–1 |
| 5 | April 17 | Cleveland Crusaders | 1–3 | Houston Aeros | 4–1 |

Semifinals vs. San Diego Mariners – Aeros win 4–0

| Game | Date | Visitor | Score | Home | Series |
|---|---|---|---|---|---|
| 1 | April 25 | Houston Aeros | 4–0 | San Diego Mariners | 1–0 |
| 2 | April 27 | Houston Aeros | 2–1 | San Diego Mariners | 2–0 |
| 3 | April 29 | San Diego Mariners | 0–6 | Houston Aeros | 3–0 |
| 4 | May 1 | San Diego Mariners | 4–5 OT | Houston Aeros | 4–0 |

Avco Cup Finals vs. Quebec Nordiques – Aeros win 4–0

| Game | Date | Visitor | Score | Home | Series |
|---|---|---|---|---|---|
| 1 | May 3 | Quebec Nordiques | 2–6 | Houston Aeros | 1–0 |
| 2 | May 6 | Quebec Nordiques | 3–5 | Houston Aeros | 2–0 |
| 3 | May 10 | Houston Aeros | 2–0 | Quebec Nordiques | 3–0 |
| 4 | May 12 | Houston Aeros | 7–2 | Quebec Nordiques | 4–0 |

Legend: Win Loss

== Player statistics ==
Scoring

Regular season
| Player | Pos | GP | G | A | Pts | PIM | +/- | PPG | SHG | GWG |
|---|---|---|---|---|---|---|---|---|---|---|
| Larry Lund | C | 78 | 33 | 75 | 108 | 68 | 28 | 13 | 0 | 0 |
| Gordie Howe | RW | 75 | 34 | 65 | 99 | 84 | 40 | 8 | 3 | 0 |
| Andre Hinse | LW | 75 | 39 | 47 | 86 | 12 | 34 | 13 | 0 | 0 |
| Frank Hughes | LW | 76 | 48 | 35 | 83 | 35 | 32 | 15 | 0 | 0 |
| Mark Howe | LW | 74 | 36 | 40 | 76 | 30 | 40 | 7 | 4 | 0 |
| Poul Popiel | D | 78 | 11 | 53 | 64 | 123 | 41 | 4 | 2 | 0 |
| Gord Labossiere | C | 76 | 23 | 34 | 57 | 40 | 5 | 4 | 0 | 0 |
| Ted Taylor | LW | 73 | 26 | 27 | 53 | 130 | 7 | 2 | 3 | 0 |
| John Schella | D | 78 | 10 | 42 | 52 | 176 | 43 | 0 | 0 | 0 |
| Jim Sherrit | C | 77 | 22 | 25 | 47 | 25 | 36 | 1 | 0 | 0 |
| Murray Hall | RW | 78 | 18 | 29 | 47 | 28 | 2 | 0 | 5 | 0 |
| Terry Ruskowski | C | 71 | 10 | 36 | 46 | 134 | 30 | 3 | 0 | 0 |
| Rich Preston | RW | 78 | 20 | 21 | 41 | 10 | 25 | 1 | 0 | 0 |
| Don Larway | RW | 76 | 22 | 14 | 36 | 59 | 26 | 0 | 0 | 0 |
| Marty Howe | D | 75 | 13 | 21 | 34 | 89 | 46 | 0 | 1 | 0 |
| Larry Hale | D | 76 | 2 | 18 | 20 | 40 | 35 | 0 | 0 | 0 |
| Glen Irwin | D | 70 | 2 | 11 | 13 | 153 | 38 | 0 | 0 | 0 |
| Bill Prentice | D | 17 | 0 | 3 | 3 | 19 | 3 | 0 | 0 | 0 |
| Ron Grahame | G | 43 | 0 | 1 | 1 | 6 | 0 | 0 | 0 | 0 |
| Wayne Rutledge | G | 35 | 0 | 0 | 0 | 0 | 0 | 0 | 0 | 0 |

Goaltending
| Player | GP | MIN | W | L | T | GA | GAA | SO |
|---|---|---|---|---|---|---|---|---|
| Ron Grahame | 2590 | 43 | 33 | 10 | 0 | 131 | 3.03 | 4 |
| Wayne Rutledge | 2092 | 35 | 20 | 15 | 0 | 113 | 3.24 | 2 |
| Team: | 4682 | 78 | 53 | 25 | 0 | 244 | 3.13 | 6 |

=== Postseason ===
| Player | Pos | GP | G | A | Pts | PIM | PPG | SHG | GWG |
|---|---|---|---|---|---|---|---|---|---|
| Mark Howe | D | 13 | 10 | 12 | 22 | 0 | 0 | 0 | 3 |
| Gordie Howe | RW | 13 | 8 | 12 | 20 | 20 | 0 | 0 | 1 |
| Larry Lund | C | 13 | 5 | 13 | 18 | 13 | 0 | 0 | 1 |
| Gord Labossiere | C | 13 | 6 | 7 | 13 | 4 | 0 | 0 | 0 |
| Frank Hughes | LW | 13 | 6 | 6 | 12 | 2 | 0 | 0 | 1 |
| Poul Popiel | D | 13 | 1 | 10 | 11 | 34 | 0 | 0 | 1 |
| Murray Hall | RW | 13 | 7 | 3 | 10 | 8 | 0 | 0 | 2 |
| Andre Hinse | LW | 11 | 5 | 4 | 9 | 8 | 0 | 0 | 0 |
| John Schella | D | 13 | 0 | 8 | 8 | 12 | 0 | 0 | 0 |
| Ted Taylor | LW | 11 | 2 | 5 | 7 | 22 | 0 | 0 | 0 |
| Rich Preston | RW | 13 | 1 | 6 | 7 | 6 | 0 | 0 | 0 |
| Terry Ruskowski | C | 13 | 4 | 2 | 6 | 15 | 0 | 0 | 1 |
| Jim Sherrit | C | 13 | 3 | 3 | 6 | 6 | 0 | 0 | 2 |
| Don Larway | RW | 13 | 3 | 1 | 4 | 8 | 0 | 0 | 0 |
| Larry Hale | D | 13 | 0 | 4 | 4 | 0 | 0 | 0 | 0 |
| Marty Howe | D | 11 | 0 | 2 | 2 | 11 | 0 | 0 | 0 |
| Glen Irwin | D | 13 | 0 | 2 | 2 | 8 | 0 | 0 | 0 |
| Ron Grahame | G | 13 | 0 | 1 | 1 | 0 | 0 | 0 | 0 |
| Bill Prentice | D | 4 | 0 | 0 | 0 | 0 | 0 | 0 | 0 |

| Player | MIN | GP | W | L | GA | GAA | SO |
|---|---|---|---|---|---|---|---|
| Ron Grahame | 780 | 13 | 12 | 1 | 26 | 2.00 | 3 |
| Team: | 780 | 13 | 12 | 1 | 26 | 2.00 | 3 |

Note: Pos = Position; GP = Games played; G = Goals; A = Assists; Pts = Points; +/- = plus/minus; PIM = Penalty minutes; PPG = Power-play goals; SHG = Short-handed goals; GWG = Game-winning goals
MIN = Minutes played; W = Wins; L = Losses; T = Ties; GA = Goals-against; GAA = Goals-against average; SO = Shutouts;

== Awards and records ==
- Ron Grahame, Ben Hatskin Trophy (Best Goaltender)
- Ron Grahame, WHA Playoff MVP
- Gordie Howe, WHA All-Star Team (First Team)
- Ron Grahame, WHA All-Star Team (First Team)
- Poul Popiel, WHA All-Star Team (Second Team)

=== 1975 WHA All-Star Game (January 21, 1975) ===
- Wayne Rutledge
- John Schella
- Poul Popiel
- Gordie Howe
- Mark Howe
- Larry Lund
- Andre Hinse
- Frank Hughes
- Ted Taylor

== Draft picks ==
Houston's draft picks at the 1974 WHA Amateur Draft.

| Round | # | Player | Nationality | College/Junior/Club team (League) |
|---|---|---|---|---|
WHA Secret Amateur Draft
| 1 | 9 | John Hughes (D) | Canada | Toronto Marlboros (OHA) |
| 1 | 15 | Rich Nantais (LW) | Canada | Quebec Remparts (QMJHL) |
| 2 | 30 | Terry Ruskowski (C) | Canada | Swift Current Broncos (WCHL) |
WHA Amateur Draft
| 1 | 15 | Dick Spannbauer (D) | United States | University of Minnesota (WCHA) |
| 2 | 30 | Pierre Larouche (F) | Canada | Sorel Black Hawks (QMJHL) |
| 3 | 45 | Pete LoPresti (G) | United States | University of Denver (WCHA) |
| 4 | 60 | Derek Smith (F) | Canada | Ottawa 67's (OHA) |
| 5 | 74 | Bob Sirois (RW) | Canada | Montreal Red White and Blue (QMJHL) |
| 6 | 89 | Ken Gassoff (C) | Canada | Medicine Hat Tigers (WCHL) |
| 7 | 104 | Murray Beck (C) | Canada | New Westminster Bruins (WCHL) |
| 8 | 119 | Jerry Badiuk (D) | Canada | Kitchener Rangers (OHA) |
| 9 | 134 | Jan Kascak (D) | Canada | St. Louis University (CCHA) |
| 10 | 147 | Ron Wilson (D) | United States | Providence College (ECAC) |
| 11 | 160 | Bob Ferriter (LW) | United States | Boston College (ECAC) |
| 12 | 173 | John McMorrow (F) | United States | Providence College (ECAC) |
| 13 | 184 | Craig Norwich (D) | United States | University of Wisconsin (WCHA) |
| 14 | 192 | Kevin MacDonald (D) | Canada | Bowling Green State University (CCHA) |
| 15 | 197 | Ian MacPhee (RW) | Canada | Swift Current Broncos (WCHL) |
| 16 | 201 | Don Hay (RW) | Canada | New Westminster Bruins (WCHL) |

== See also ==
- 1974–75 WHA season
