= 1974–75 Vancouver Blazers season =

World Hockey Association team season

1974–75 Vancouver Blazers
- Division: 4th Canadian
- 1974–75 record: 37–39–2
- Home record: 25–12–2
- Road record: 12–27–0
- Goals for: 256
- Goals against: 270

Team information
- Coach: Joe Crozier
- Arena: Pacific Coliseum

Team leaders
- Goals: Danny Lawson (33)
- Assists: Danny Lawson (43)
- Points: Danny Lawson (76)
- Penalty minutes: Rick Jodzio (159)
- Wins: Don McLeod (32)
- Goals against average: Don McLeod (3.34)

The 1974–75 Vancouver Blazers season was the Vancouver Blazers' third season of operation in the World Hockey Association (WHA), and their second and final season in Vancouver. The Blazers failed to make the playoffs. The franchise moved to Calgary after this season and became the Cowboys.

== Regular season ==
=== Final standings ===
Canadian Division	GP	W	L	T	Pts	GF	GA	PIM
Quebec Nordiques	78	46	32	0	92	331	299	1132
Toronto Toros	78	43	33	2	88	349	304	883
Winnipeg Jets	78	38	35	5	81	322	293	869
Vancouver Blazers	78	37	39	2	76	256	270	1075
Edmonton Oilers	78	36	38	4	76	279	279	896

== Schedule and results ==
1974–75 regular season
October

Game	Result	Date	Score	Opponent	Record
1	L	October 15, 1974	2–6	Winnipeg Jets (1974–75)	0–1–0
2	L	October 16, 1974	0–6	Houston Aeros (1974–75)	0–2–0
3	L	October 18, 1974	1–2	Chicago Cougars (1974–75)	0–3–0
4	W	October 20, 1974	3–1	Chicago Cougars (1974–75)	1–3–0
5	W	October 23, 1974	4–1	Cleveland Crusaders (1974–75)	2–3–0
6	W	October 30, 1974	8–6	Edmonton Oilers (1974–75)	3–3–0

November

Game	Result	Date	Score	Opponent	Record
7	L	November 3, 1974	2–6	San Diego Mariners (1974–75)	3–4–0
8	W	November 5, 1974	5–4	@ Chicago Cougars (1974–75)	4–4–0
9	L	November 6, 1974	3–5	@ Quebec Nordiques (1974–75)	4–5–0
10	L	November 8, 1974	1–2	Cleveland Crusaders (1974–75)	4–6–0
11	T	November 9, 1974	3–3	Winnipeg Jets (1974–75)	4–6–1
12	L	November 13, 1974	3–5	Toronto Toros (1974–75)	4–7–1
13	L	November 19, 1974	2–3	@ San Diego Mariners (1974–75)	4–8–1
14	L	November 22, 1974	1–4	Houston Aeros (1974–75)	4–9–1
15	L	November 23, 1974	2–4	Houston Aeros (1974–75)	4–10–1
16	W	November 26, 1974	5–1	@ Michigan Stags/Baltimore Blades (1974–75)	5–10–1
17	W	November 28, 1974	6–2	@ Toronto Toros (1974–75)	6–10–1
18	W	November 29, 1974	5–1	New England Whalers (1974–75)	7–10–1

December

Game	Result	Date	Score	Opponent	Record
19	L	December 4, 1974	3–6	@ Edmonton Oilers (1974–75)	7–11–1
20	W	December 7, 1974	4–2	Michigan Stags/Baltimore Blades (1974–75)	8–11–1
21	W	December 8, 1974	4–2	Minnesota Fighting Saints (1974–75)	9–11–1
22	W	December 10, 1974	4–3	@ Cleveland Crusaders (1974–75)	10–11–1
23	L	December 11, 1974	2–5	@ Houston Aeros (1974–75)	10–12–1
24	L	December 12, 1974	2–4	@ Phoenix Roadrunners (1974–75)	10–13–1
25	W	December 15, 1974	2–1	Cleveland Crusaders (1974–75)	11–13–1
26	W	December 17, 1974	3–2	@ Indianapolis Racers (1974–75)	12–13–1
27	L	December 18, 1974	3–5	@ Phoenix Roadrunners (1974–75)	12–14–1
28	W	December 19, 1974	3–1	@ Houston Aeros (1974–75)	13–14–1
29	W	December 21, 1974	2–1	San Diego Mariners (1974–75)	14–14–1
30	W	December 26, 1974	8–1	Michigan Stags/Baltimore Blades (1974–75)	15–14–1
31	T	December 27, 1974	1–1	Indianapolis Racers (1974–75)	15–14–2

January

Game	Result	Date	Score	Opponent	Record
32	W	January 2, 1975	3–2	Phoenix Roadrunners (1974–75)	16–14–2
33	L	January 4, 1975	3–4 OT	@ New England Whalers (1974–75)	16–15–2
34	L	January 5, 1975	1–3	@ Michigan Stags/Baltimore Blades (1974–75)	16–16–2
35	L	January 7, 1975	2–4	@ Indianapolis Racers (1974–75)	16–17–2
36	L	January 8, 1975	3–4	@ Quebec Nordiques (1974–75)	16–18–2
37	L	January 10, 1975	4–6	@ Cleveland Crusaders (1974–75)	16–19–2
38	L	January 14, 1975	2–6	Quebec Nordiques (1974–75)	16–20–2
39	W	January 15, 1975	4–2	@ Winnipeg Jets (1974–75)	17–20–2
40	W	January 19, 1975	5–1	Indianapolis Racers (1974–75)	18–20–2
41	W	January 22, 1975	2–1	@ Minnesota Fighting Saints (1974–75)	19–20–2
42	L	January 23, 1975	1–6	@ San Diego Mariners (1974–75)	19–21–2
43	W	January 24, 1975	4–3 OT	Winnipeg Jets (1974–75)	20–21–2
44	W	January 26, 1975	5–3	@ Chicago Cougars (1974–75)	21–21–2
45	L	January 30, 1975	3–6	@ Minnesota Fighting Saints (1974–75)	21–22–2
46	L	January 31, 1975	0–6	@ Toronto Toros (1974–75)	21–23–2

February

Game	Result	Date	Score	Opponent	Record
47	W	February 2, 1975	4–2	Toronto Toros (1974–75)	22–23–2
48	W	February 5, 1975	4–2	Chicago Cougars (1974–75)	23–23–2
49	W	February 8, 1975	4–1	New England Whalers (1974–75)	24–23–2
50	W	February 9, 1975	5–1	New England Whalers (1974–75)	25–23–2
51	W	February 12, 1975	5–4	Phoenix Roadrunners (1974–75)	26–23–2
52	L	February 16, 1975	4–7	Toronto Toros (1974–75)	26–24–2
53	W	February 18, 1975	9–2	@ Indianapolis Racers (1974–75)	27–24–2
54	L	February 20, 1975	3–4	@ Michigan Stags/Baltimore Blades (1974–75)	27–25–2
55	W	February 22, 1975	4–2	@ Houston Aeros (1974–75)	28–25–2
56	L	February 23, 1975	1–2	@ Chicago Cougars (1974–75)	28–26–2
57	L	February 25, 1975	2–3	@ New England Whalers (1974–75)	28–27–2
58	L	February 27, 1975	7–9	@ Quebec Nordiques (1974–75)	28–28–2

March

Game	Result	Date	Score	Opponent	Record
59	L	March 2, 1975	1–4	@ New England Whalers (1974–75)	28–29–2
60	W	March 5, 1975	6–0	Edmonton Oilers (1974–75)	29–29–2
61	L	March 7, 1975	0–4	@ Edmonton Oilers (1974–75)	29–30–2
62	W	March 9, 1975	4–3	Phoenix Roadrunners (1974–75)	30–30–2
63	W	March 12, 1975	4–2	Minnesota Fighting Saints (1974–75)	31–30–2
64	W	March 15, 1975	7–4	Quebec Nordiques (1974–75)	32–30–2
65	W	March 16, 1975	4–2	Quebec Nordiques (1974–75)	33–30–2
66	L	March 18, 1975	3–5	Minnesota Fighting Saints (1974–75)	33–31–2
67	L	March 19, 1975	3–8	@ Winnipeg Jets (1974–75)	33–32–2
68	L	March 22, 1975	2–4	@ Phoenix Roadrunners (1974–75)	33–33–2
69	L	March 23, 1975	0–1 OT	@ San Diego Mariners (1974–75)	33–34–2
70	L	March 25, 1975	4–8	@ Toronto Toros (1974–75)	33–35–2
71	L	March 26, 1975	2–4	@ Cleveland Crusaders (1974–75)	33–36–2
72	L	March 29, 1975	3–7	San Diego Mariners (1974–75)	33–37–2
73	W	March 30, 1975	4–3	Michigan Stags/Baltimore Blades (1974–75)	34–37–2

April

Game	Result	Date	Score	Opponent	Record
74	L	April 1, 1975	2–5	@ Minnesota Fighting Saints (1974–75)	34–38–2
75	W	April 2, 1975	6–4	@ Winnipeg Jets (1974–75)	35–38–2
76	L	April 4, 1975	3–5	@ Edmonton Oilers (1974–75)	35–39–2
77	W	April 5, 1975	3–2	Edmonton Oilers (1974–75)	36–39–2
78	W	April 6, 1975	4–3	Indianapolis Racers (1974–75)	37–39–2

Legend: Win (2 points) Loss (0 points) Tie (1 point)

== Player statistics ==
Regular season
Scoring

Player	Pos	GP	G	A	Pts	PIM	+/-	PPG	SHG	GWG
Danny Lawson	RW	78	33	43	76	19	-5	3	1	0
Bryan Campbell	C	78	29	34	63	24	-15	10	1	0
John McKenzie	RW	74	23	37	60	84	11	5	0	0
Rob Walton	C	75	24	33	57	28	1	7	0	0
Hugh Harris	C	58	23	34	57	49	6	6	0	0
Claude St. Sauveur	C	76	24	23	47	32	-8	11	0	0
Mike Pelyk	D	75	14	26	40	121	-2	1	3	0
Ron Chipperfield	C	78	19	20	39	30	-2	7	0	0
Pat Price	D	68	5	29	34	15	6	1	0	0
Don Burgess	LW	62	11	18	29	19	2	2	0	0
Duane Rupp	D	73	3	26	29	45	20	1	0	0
Larry Israelson	LW	46	12	9	21	10	-2	1	0	0
Jimmy Jones	RW	63	11	7	18	39	-5	0	3	0
Paul Terbenche	D	60	3	14	17	10	-7	0	0	0
Butch Deadmarsh	LW	38	7	8	15	128	-4	1	0	0
Don McCulloch	D	51	1	9	10	42	-12	0	0	0
Don McLeod	G	72	0	8	8	14	0	0	0	0
Andy Bathgate	RW	11	1	6	7	2	0	0	0	0
John Migneault	LW	14	4	2	6	12	-1	0	0	0
John Shmyr	D	39	1	5	6	43	-9	0	0	0
Peter Driscoll	LW	21	3	2	5	40	-2	0	0	0
Rick Jodzio	LW	44	1	3	4	159	-12	0	0	0
Peter McNamee	D	11	2	1	3	15	3	1	0	0
Murray Myers	RW	24	1	1	2	4	-4	0	0	0
Jim Cardiff	D	44	0	2	2	25	-7	0	0	0
Bud Gulka	RW	5	1	0	1	10	0	0	0	0
Arnie Brown	D	10	0	1	1	13	-8	0	0	0
Serge Beaudoin	D	4	0	0	0	2	0	0	0	0
Mike Chernoff	LW	3	0	0	0	0	0	0	0	0
Ray Delorenzi	RW	3	0	0	0	0	0	0	0	0
Dave Given	RW	1	0	0	0	0	0	0	0	0
Don O'Donoghue	RW	4	0	0	0	0	0	0	0	0
Wayne Wood	G	11	0	0	0	0	0	0	0	0

Goaltending

Player	MIN	GP	W	L	T	GA	GAA	SO
Don McLeod	4184	72	33	35	2	233	3.34	1
Wayne Wood	512	11	4	4	0	30	3.52	0
Team:	4696	78	37	39	2	263	3.36	1

Playoffs
Scoring

Player	Pos	GP	G	A	Pts	PIM	PPG	SHG	GWG

Goaltending

Player	MIN	GP	W	L	GA	GAA	SO

Note: Pos = Position; GP = Games played; G = Goals; A = Assists; Pts = Points; +/- = plus/minus; PIM = Penalty minutes; PPG = Power-play goals; SHG = Short-handed goals; GWG = Game-winning goals
MIN = Minutes played; W = Wins; L = Losses; T = Ties; GA = Goals-against; GAA = Goals-against average; SO = Shutouts;

== Draft picks ==
Vancouver's draft picks at the 1974 WHA Amateur Draft.

Round	#	Player	Nationality	College/Junior/Club team (League)
WHA Secret Amateur Draft
1	5	Ron Greschner (D)	Canada	New Westminster Bruins (WCHL)
2	20	Ron Chipperfield (C)	Canada	Brandon Wheat Kings (WCHL)
WHA Amateur Draft
1	1	Pat Price (D)	Canada	Saskatoon Blades (WCHL)
2	20	Jacques Cossette (RW)	Canada	Sorel Black Hawks (QMJHL)
3	35	Peter Driscoll (LW)	Canada	Kingston Canadians (OHA)
4	50	Dave Given (F)	United States	Brown University (ECAC)
5	64	Steve Jensen (LW)	United States	Michigan Tech (WCHA)
6	79	Dave Lumley (F)	Canada	University of New Hampshire (ECAC)
7	94	Mike Hobin (F)	Canada	Hamilton Red Wings (OHA)
8	109	Mario Faubert (D)	Canada	St. Louis University (CCHA)
9	124	John Held (D)	Canada	London Knights (OHA)
10	138	Eddie Mio (G)	Canada	Colorado College (WCHA)
11	152	Jim Miller (W)	Canada	University of Denver (WCHA)
12	165	Dave Otness (W)	United States	University of Wisconsin (WCHA)
13	177	Walt Kyle (C)	United States	Waterloo Black Hawks (USHL)

== See also ==
- 1974–75 WHA season
