= 1974–75 Winnipeg Jets season =

NHA hockey team season

1974–75 Winnipeg Jets
- Division: 3rd Canadian
- 1974–75 record: 38–35–5
- Home record: 23–13–3
- Road record: 15–22–2
- Goals for: 322
- Goals against: 293

Team information
- General manager: Rudy Pilous
- Coach: Rudy Pilous, Bobby Hull
- Captain: Dan Johnson
- Alternate captains: Dan Spring; Larry Hornung
- Arena: Winnipeg Arena

Team leaders
- Goals: Bobby Hull (77)
- Assists: Ulf Nilsson (94)
- Points: Bobby Hull (142)
- Penalty minutes: Perry Miller (133)
- Wins: Joe Daley (23)
- Goals against average: Joe Daley (3.62)

The 1974–75 Winnipeg Jets season was the Jets' third season of operation in the World Hockey Association (WHA). The club finished third in the Canadian Division and missed the playoffs, the only time they did not reach the postseason in their WHA tenure.

== Regular season ==
=== Final standings ===
Canadian Division	GP	W	L	T	Pts	GF	GA	PIM
Quebec Nordiques	78	46	32	0	92	331	299	1132
Toronto Toros	78	43	33	2	88	349	304	883
Winnipeg Jets	78	38	35	5	81	322	293	869
Vancouver Blazers	78	37	39	2	76	256	270	1075
Edmonton Oilers	78	36	38	4	76	279	279	896

== Schedule and results ==
1974–75 regular season
October: 4–1–0, 8 points (home: 3–0–0; road: 1–1–0)

Game	Result	Date	Score	Opponent	Record
1	W	October 15, 1974	6–2	@ Vancouver Blazers (1974–75)	1–0–0
2	W	October 18, 1974	4–0	Edmonton Oilers (1974–75)	2–0–0
3	L	October 25, 1974	1–3	@ Toronto Toros (1974–75)	2–1–0
4	W	October 27, 1974	5–2	Michigan Stags/Baltimore Blades (1974–75)	3–1–0
5	W	October 30, 1974	6–5 OT	Phoenix Roadrunners (1974–75)	4–1–0

November: 7–5–1, 15 points (home: 6–2–0; road: 1–3–1)

Game	Result	Date	Score	Opponent	Record
6	W	November 1, 1974	10–1	Toronto Toros (1974–75)	5–1–0
7	W	November 3, 1974	11–3	Michigan Stags/Baltimore Blades (1974–75)	6–1–0
8	W	November 5, 1974	6–4	Minnesota Fighting Saints (1974–75)	7–1–0
9	T	November 9, 1974	3–3	@ Vancouver Blazers (1974–75)	7–1–1
10	L	November 13, 1974	3–5	@ Edmonton Oilers (1974–75)	7–2–1
11	W	November 15, 1974	5–0	Indianapolis Racers (1974–75)	8–2–1
12	L	November 17, 1974	1–3	Toronto Toros (1974–75)	8–3–1
13	L	November 18, 1974	3–5	@ Edmonton Oilers (1974–75)	8–4–1
14	W	November 20, 1974	3–1	Minnesota Fighting Saints (1974–75)	9–4–1
15	L	November 24, 1974	1–3	Phoenix Roadrunners (1974–75)	9–5–1
16	W	November 26, 1974	4–0	@ Indianapolis Racers (1974–75)	10–5–1
17	L	November 27, 1974	4–5 OT	@ Cleveland Crusaders (1974–75)	10–6–1
18	W	November 29, 1974	7–6	Michigan Stags/Baltimore Blades (1974–75)	11–6–1

December: 6–8–0, 12 points (home: 2–3–0; road: 4–5–0)

Game	Result	Date	Score	Opponent	Record
19	W	December 1, 1974	3–2	Quebec Nordiques (1974–75)	12–6–1
20	L	December 4, 1974	2–3	Houston Aeros (1974–75)	12–7–1
21	L	December 6, 1974	2–4	@ Minnesota Fighting Saints (1974–75)	12–8–1
22	W	December 8, 1974	5–2	Chicago Cougars (1974–75)	13–8–1
23	W	December 10, 1974	5–3	@ Indianapolis Racers (1974–75)	14–8–1
24	L	December 12, 1974	3–5	@ Michigan Stags/Baltimore Blades (1974–75)	14–9–1
25	L	December 14, 1974	3–5	@ Houston Aeros (1974–75)	14–10–1
26	L	December 15, 1974	3–4	New England Whalers (1974–75)	14–11–1
27	W	December 17, 1974	4–1	@ Toronto Toros (1974–75)	15–11–1
28	L	December 18, 1974	1–5	@ Quebec Nordiques (1974–75)	15–12–1
29	L	December 22, 1974	2–4	Phoenix Roadrunners (1974–75)	15–13–1
30	W	December 26, 1974	3–2	@ Phoenix Roadrunners (1974–75)	16–13–1
31	W	December 28, 1974	6–4	@ San Diego Mariners (1974–75)	17–13–1
32	L	December 29, 1974	3–6	@ Houston Aeros (1974–75)	17–14–1

January: 3–7–1, 7 points (home: 1–4–0; road: 2–3–1)

Game	Result	Date	Score	Opponent	Record
33	T	January 7, 1975	4–4	@ Cleveland Crusaders (1974–75)	17–14–2
34	L	January 9, 1975	4–5 OT	@ Michigan Stags/Baltimore Blades (1974–75)	17–15–2
35	L	January 10, 1975	1–6	Quebec Nordiques (1974–75)	17–16–2
36	L	January 15, 1975	2–4	Vancouver Blazers (1974–75)	17–17–2
37	W	January 19, 1975	9–4	Cleveland Crusaders (1974–75)	18–17–2
38	L	January 22, 1975	1–3	Indianapolis Racers (1974–75)	18–18–2
39	L	January 23, 1975	3–7	@ Edmonton Oilers (1974–75)	18–19–2
40	L	January 24, 1975	3–4 OT	@ Vancouver Blazers (1974–75)	18–20–2
41	L	January 26, 1975	1–3	Houston Aeros (1974–75)	18–21–2
42	W	January 28, 1975	9–7	@ San Diego Mariners (1974–75)	19–21–2
43	W	January 30, 1975	5–3	@ Phoenix Roadrunners (1974–75)	20–21–2

February: 7–6–1, 15 points (home: 5–3–1; road: 2–3–0)

Game	Result	Date	Score	Opponent	Record
44	L	February 2, 1975	4–5 OT	@ Minnesota Fighting Saints (1974–75)	20–22–2
45	L	February 5, 1975	2–3	@ Cleveland Crusaders (1974–75)	20–23–2
46	L	February 7, 1975	4–5 OT	New England Whalers (1974–75)	20–24–2
47	L	February 8, 1975	3–6	@ Chicago Cougars (1974–75)	20–25–2
48	W	February 9, 1975	3–2	Chicago Cougars (1974–75)	21–25–2
49	L	February 12, 1975	4–7	Toronto Toros (1974–75)	21–26–2
50	W	February 14, 1975	5–3	Houston Aeros (1974–75)	22–26–2
51	W	February 15, 1975	5–1	Cleveland Crusaders (1974–75)	23–26–2
52	W	February 16, 1975	6–3	@ Chicago Cougars (1974–75)	24–26–2
53	W	February 18, 1975	5–3	@ Michigan Stags/Baltimore Blades (1974–75)	25–26–2
54	W	February 19, 1975	4–1	Edmonton Oilers (1974–75)	26–26–2
55	L	February 23, 1975	1–2 OT	New England Whalers (1974–75)	26–27–2
56	T	February 25, 1975	6–6	Minnesota Fighting Saints (1974–75)	26–27–3
57	W	February 28, 1975	4–3	San Diego Mariners (1974–75)	27–27–3

March: 11–5–1, 23 points (home: 6–0–1; road: 5–5–0)

Game	Result	Date	Score	Opponent	Record
58	T	March 2, 1975	4–4	San Diego Mariners (1974–75)	27–27–4
59	W	March 5, 1975	4–2	Cleveland Crusaders (1974–75)	28–27–4
60	L	March 7, 1975	4–7	@ Phoenix Roadrunners (1974–75)	28–28–4
61	L	March 8, 1975	5–6	@ San Diego Mariners (1974–75)	28–29–4
62	W	March 9, 1975	6–5 OT	@ Minnesota Fighting Saints (1974–75)	29–29–4
63	L	March 11, 1975	2–6	@ New England Whalers (1974–75)	29–30–4
64	L	March 12, 1975	3–5	@ Quebec Nordiques (1974–75)	29–31–4
65	W	March 14, 1975	4–3	Quebec Nordiques (1974–75)	30–31–4
66	W	March 16, 1975	10–1	Edmonton Oilers (1974–75)	31–31–4
67	W	March 19, 1975	8–3	Vancouver Blazers (1974–75)	32–31–4
68	W	March 21, 1975	6–3	@ New England Whalers (1974–75)	33–31–4
69	W	March 22, 1975	4–2	@ Chicago Cougars (1974–75)	34–31–4
70	W	March 23, 1975	4–3	Chicago Cougars (1974–75)	35–31–4
71	W	March 25, 1975	4–3 OT	@ Indianapolis Racers (1974–75)	36–31–4
72	L	March 27, 1975	0–8	@ Houston Aeros (1974–75)	36–32–4
73	W	March 29, 1975	9–3	@ New England Whalers (1974–75)	37–32–4
74	W	March 31, 1975	4–1	Indianapolis Racers (1974–75)	38–32–4

April: 0–3–1, 1 point (home: 0–1–1; road: 0–2–0)

Game	Result	Date	Score	Opponent	Record
75	L	April 2, 1975	4–6	Vancouver Blazers (1974–75)	38–33–4
76	L	April 4, 1975	1–7	@ Toronto Toros (1974–75)	38–34–4
77	L	April 5, 1975	5–9	@ Quebec Nordiques (1974–75)	38–35–4
78	T	April 6, 1975	5–5	San Diego Mariners (1974–75)	38–35–5

Legend: Win (2 points) Loss (0 points) Tie (1 point)

== Draft picks ==
Winnipeg's draft picks at the 1974 WHA Amateur Draft.

Round	#	Player	Nationality	College/Junior/Club team (League)
WHA Secret Amateur Draft
1	11	Danny Gare (F)	Canada	Calgary Centennials (WCHL)
2	26	Gord McTavish (F)	Canada	Sudbury Wolves (OHA)
2	27	Ron Ashton (LW)	Canada	Saskatoon Blades (WCHL)
WHA Amateur Draft
1	7	Randy Andreachuk (C)	Canada	Kamloops Chiefs (WCHL)
2	22	Brian Engblom (D)	Canada	University of Wisconsin (WCHA)
3	37	Kim MacDougall (D)	Canada	Regina Pats (WCHL)
4	52	Boyd Anderson (LW)	Canada	Medicine Hat Tigers (WCHL)
5	66	Rick Uhrich (RW)	Canada	Regina Pats (WCHL)
6	81	Dave Rooke (C)	Canada	Cornwall Royals (QMJHL)
7	96	Bob Ferguson (C)	Canada	Cornwall Royals (QMJHL)
8	111	John Duncan (D)	Canada	Cornwall Royals (QMJHL)
9	126	Wayne Wilhelm (G)	Canada	Brandon Wheat Kings (WCHL)
10	139	Mike Wanchuk (RW)	Canada	Regina Pats (WCHL)
11	154	John Memryk (G)	Canada	Winnipeg Clubs (WCHL)
12	167	Marcel Dumais (C)	Canada	Sherbrooke Castors (QMJHL)
19	207	Tom Wynne (G)	Canada	Cornwall Royals (QMJHL)

== See also ==
- 1974–75 WHA season
