= Richard Dumas (disambiguation) =

Richard Dumas may refer to:

- Rich Dumas (born 1945), retired American professional basketball player
- Richard Dumas (born 1969), retired American professional basketball player
- Richard Dumas (ice hockey) (born 1951), retired Canadian ice hockey goaltender
