= Bob Mowat =

Canadian ice hockey player

- Born: October 5, 1949 (age 76) Kamloops, British Columbia, Canada
- Height: 5 ft 9 in (175 cm)
- Weight: 165 lb (75 kg; 11 st 11 lb)
- Position: Right wing
- Played for: Phoenix Roadrunners
- Playing career: 1970–1975

Bob Mowat (born October 5, 1949) is a Canadian former professional ice hockey right winger.

Mowat played one season in World Hockey Association for the Phoenix Roadrunners during the 1974–75 WHA season. He was born in Kamloops, British Columbia.

== Career statistics ==
=== Regular season and playoffs ===
			Regular season					Playoffs
Season	Team	League	GP	G	A	Pts	PIM	GP	G	A	Pts	PIM
1967–68	Penticton Broncos	BCJHL	Statistics Unavailable
1968–69	Winnipeg Jets	WCHL	48	16	30	46	17	––	––	––	––	––
1969–70	Winnipeg Jets	WCHL	52	26	38	64	68	––	––	––	––	––
1970–71	Charlotte Checkers	EHL	74	31	41	72	94	13	4	15	19	31
1971–72	Charlotte Checkers	EHL	68	34	34	68	82	15	1	9	10	37
1972–73	Phoenix Roadrunners	WHL	56	6	13	19	31	10	2	3	5	0
1973–74	Phoenix Roadrunners	WHL	70	22	32	54	39	7	1	5	6	8
1974–75	Phoenix Roadrunners	WHA	53	9	10	19	34	4	0	0	0	0
1974–75	Tulsa Oilers	CHL	15	4	5	9	2	––	––	––	––	––
WHA totals			53	9	10	19	34	4	0	0	0	0
