= Richard Dumas (ice hockey) =

Canadian ice hockey player

- Born: August 21, 1951 (age 74) Granby, Quebec, Canada
- Height: 5 ft 11 in (180 cm)
- Weight: 175 lb (79 kg; 12 st 7 lb)
- Position: Goaltender
- Played for: Chicago Cougars (WHA); Des Moines Oak Leafs (IHL); Long Island Cougars (NAHL)
- NHL draft: Undrafted
- Playing career: 1972–1977

Richard Dumas (born August 21, 1951) is a Canadian former professional ice hockey goaltender. During the 1974–75 season, Dumas played one game in the World Hockey Association with the Chicago Cougars.

== Career statistics ==
			Regular season									Playoffs
Season	Team	League	GP	W	L	T	MIN	GA	SO	GAA	SV%	GP	W	L	MIN	GA	SO	GAA	SV%
1971–72	Des Moines Oak Leafs	IHL
1972–73	Chicago Warriors	USHL	30	—	—	—	—	116	3	3.85	—	—	—	—	—	—	—	—	—
1973–74	Long Island Cougars	NAHL	19	8	10	0	1015	71	0	4.20	—	—	—	—	—	—	—	—	—
1974–75	Chicago Warriors	USHL	21	4	13	0	1044	118	0	6.78	.838	—	—	—	—	—	—	—	—
1974–75	Chicago Cougars	WHA	1	—	—	—	1	0	0	0	—	—	—	—	—	—	—	—	—
1975–76	Traverse City Bays	USHL	38	—	—	—	—	—	—	—	—	—	—	—	—	—	—	—	—
1976–77	Green Bay Bobcats	USHL	3	—	—	—	180	12	0	4.00	—	—	—	—	—	—	—	—	—
WHA totals			1	—	—	—	1	0	0	0	—	—	—	—	—	—	—	—	—
