= 1974–75 Toronto Toros season =

World Hockey Association team season

1974–75 Toronto Toros
- League: 5th WHA
- Division: 2nd Canadian
- 1974–75 record: 43–33–2
- Home record: 24–15–0
- Road record: 19–18–2
- Goals for: 349
- Goals against: 304

Team information
- Coach: Billy Harris; Bob Leduc
- Captain: Frank Mahovlich
- Alternate captains: Jim Dorey; Gavin Kirk
- Arena: Maple Leaf Gardens
- Average attendance: 10,436

Team leaders
- Goals: Tom Simpson (52)
- Assists: Wayne Dillon (66)
- Points: Wayne Dillon (95)
- Penalty minutes: Rick Cunningham (117)
- Wins: Gilles Gratton (30)
- Goals against average: Les Binkley (3.65)

The 1974–75 Toronto Toros season was the team's second season in Toronto, after spending their inaugural season as the Ottawa Nationals in 1972–73. The Toros moved from Varsity Arena to Maple Leaf Gardens for the start of their second season.

== Regular season ==
=== Season standings ===
Canadian Division	GP	W	L	T	Pts	GF	GA	PIM
Quebec Nordiques	78	46	32	0	92	331	299	1132
Toronto Toros	78	43	33	2	88	349	304	883
Winnipeg Jets	78	38	35	5	81	322	293	869
Vancouver Blazers	78	37	39	2	76	256	270	1075
Edmonton Oilers	78	36	38	4	76	279	279	896

== Schedule and results ==
1974–75 regular season
October

Game	Date	Visitor	Score	Home	Record	Pts
1	October 15	New England Whalers	2–6	Toronto Toros	1–0–0	2
2	October 18	Indianapolis Racers	1–3	Toronto Toros	2–0–0	4
3	October 20	Michigan Stags/Baltimore Blades	3–4	Toronto Toros	3–0–0	6
4	October 22	Minnesota Fighting Saints	2–11	Toronto Toros	4–0–0	8
5	October 25	Winnipeg Jets	1–3	Toronto Toros	5–0–0	10
6	October 28	Phoenix Roadrunners	3–7	Toronto Toros	6–0–0	12
7	October 30	Toronto Toros	2–5	New England Whalers	6–1–0	12

November

Game	Date	Visitor	Score	Home	Record	Pts
8	November 1	Toronto Toros	1–10	Winnipeg Jets	6–2–0	12
9	November 2	Toronto Toros	3–4 OT	Chicago Cougars	6–3–0	12
10	November 4	Quebec Nordiques	5–3	Toronto Toros	6–4–0	12
11	November 5	Toronto Toros	5–2	Michigan Stags/Baltimore Blades	7–4–0	14
12	November 9	Toronto Toros	7–4	Minnesota Fighting Saints	8–4–0	16
13	November 10	Toronto Toros	7–0	Chicago Cougars	9–4–0	18
14	November 13	Toronto Toros	5–3	Vancouver Blazers	10–4–0	20
15	November 15	Toronto Toros	4–5	Edmonton Oilers	10–5–0	20
16	November 17	Toronto Toros	3–1	Winnipeg Jets	11–5–0	22
17	November 19	Toronto Toros	6–5	Cleveland Crusaders	12–5–0	24
18	November 22	Edmonton Oilers	8–2	Toronto Toros	12–6–0	24
19	November 23	Toronto Toros	9–2	Quebec Nordiques	13–6–0	26
20	November 24	Toronto Toros	9–2	Indianapolis Racers	14–6–0	28
21	November 26	Minnesota Fighting Saints	6–2	Toronto Toros	14–7–0	28
22	November 28	Vancouver Blazers	6–2	Toronto Toros	14–8–0	28
23	November 29	Toronto Toros	4–4	Phoenix Roadrunners	14–8–1	29

December

Game	Date	Visitor	Score	Home	Record	Pts
24	December 1	Toronto Toros	3–1	San Diego Mariners	15–8–1	31
25	December 3	Houston Aeros	5–4	Toronto Toros	15–9–1	31
26	December 7	Toronto Toros	3–9	Chicago Cougars	15–10–1	31
27	December 8	Toronto Toros	5–2	Phoenix Roadrunners	16–10–1	33
28	December 10	Minnesota Fighting Saints	4–2	Toronto Toros	16–11–1	33
29	December 13	Cleveland Crusaders	6–7 OT	Toronto Toros	17–11–1	35
30	December 15	Toronto Toros	7–2	Michigan Stags/Baltimore Blades	18–11–1	37
31	December 17	Winnipeg Jets	4–1	Toronto Toros	18–12–1	37
32	December 22	Chicago Cougars	2–5	Toronto Toros	19–12–1	39
33	December 23	Cleveland Crusaders	4–1	Toronto Toros	19–13–1	39
34	December 27	Chicago Cougars	2–4	Toronto Toros	20–13–1	41

January

Game	Date	Visitor	Score	Home	Record	Pts
35	January 3	New England Whalers	5–3	Toronto Toros	20–14–1	41
36	January 4	Toronto Toros	1–3	Quebec Nordiques	20–15–1	41
37	January 5	Toronto Toros	4–3	Cleveland Crusaders	21–15–1	43
38	January 7	Phoenix Roadrunners	3–2	Toronto Toros	21–16–1	43
39	January 10	San Diego Mariners	3–4	Toronto Toros	22–16–1	45
40	January 12	Toronto Toros	7–4	Houston Aeros	23–16–1	47
41	January 14	Toronto Toros	4–6	San Diego Mariners	23–17–1	47
42	January 15	Toronto Toros	5–5	Phoenix Roadrunners	23–17–2	48
43	January 17	Toronto Toros	1–2	New England Whalers	23–18–2	48
44	January 24	Toronto Toros	5–7	Minnesota Fighting Saints	23–19–2	48
45	January 26	Toronto Toros	7–5	Edmonton Oilers	24–19–2	50
46	January 28	Quebec Nordiques	4–6	Toronto Toros	25–19–2	52
47	January 30	Toronto Toros	3–2	Indianapolis Racers	26–19–2	54
48	January 31	Vancouver Blazers	0–6	Toronto Toros	27–19–2	56

February

Game	Date	Visitor	Score	Home	Record	Pts
49	February 2	Toronto Toros	2–4	Vancouver Blazers	27–20–2	56
50	February 4	Toronto Toros	4–8	San Diego Mariners	27–21–2	56
51	February 5	Toronto Toros	2–5	Houston Aeros	27–22–2	56
52	February 7	Cleveland Crusaders	1–4	Toronto Toros	28–22–2	58
53	February 9	Indianapolis Racers	5–7	Toronto Toros	29–22–2	60
54	February 11	Edmonton Oilers	3–4	Toronto Toros	30–22–2	62
55	February 12	Toronto Toros	7–4	Winnipeg Jets	31–22–2	64
56	February 14	Toronto Toros	4–8	Edmonton Oilers	31–23–2	64
57	February 16	Toronto Toros	7–4	Vancouver Blazers	32–23–2	66
58	February 20	Chicago Cougars	4–3 OT	Toronto Toros	32–24–2	66
59	February 22	Toronto Toros	3–4	Cleveland Crusaders	32–25–2	66
60	February 23	Toronto Toros	1–5	Houston Aeros	32–26–2	66
61	February 25	San Diego Mariners	4–6	Toronto Toros	33–26–2	68

March

Game	Date	Visitor	Score	Home	Record	Pts
62	March 2	Toronto Toros	3–5	Minnesota Fighting Saints	33–27–2	68
63	March 4	Michigan Stags/Baltimore Blades	4–6	Toronto Toros	34–27–2	70
64	March 7	Quebec Nordiques	4–1	Toronto Toros	34–28–2	70
65	March 8	Toronto Toros	7–4	Michigan Stags/Baltimore Blades	35–28–2	72
66	March 9	Michigan Stags/Baltimore Blades	2–8	Toronto Toros	36–28–2	74
67	March 11	Phoenix Roadrunners	4–7	Toronto Toros	37–28–2	76
68	March 13	Toronto Toros	4–5	Indianapolis Racers	37–29–2	76
69	March 14	San Diego Mariners	6–4	Toronto Toros	37–30–2	76
70	March 16	Toronto Toros	5–7	New England Whalers	37–31–2	76
71	March 17	Houston Aeros	4–5	Toronto Toros	38–31–2	78
72	March 25	Vancouver Blazers	4–8	Toronto Toros	39–31–2	80
73	March 28	Edmonton Oilers	4–5	Toronto Toros	40–31–2	82
74	March 29	Toronto Toros	5–4 OT	Quebec Nordiques	41–31–2	84
75	March 30	New England Whalers	4–3	Toronto Toros	41–32–2	84

April

Game	Date	Visitor	Score	Home	Record	Pts
76	April 1	Indianapolis Racers	1–7	Toronto Toros	42–32–2	86
77	April 4	Winnipeg Jets	1–7	Toronto Toros	43–32–2	88
78	April 6	Houston Aeros	5–2	Toronto Toros	43–33–2	88

Legend: Win (2 points) Loss (0 points) Tie (1 point)

== Playoffs ==
1975 Avco Cup playoffs
Quarterfinals vs. San Diego Mariners – Mariners win 4–2

Game	Date	Visitor	Score	Home	Series
1	April 9	Toronto Toros	3–5	San Diego Mariners	0–1
2	April 12	Toronto Toros	6–7	San Diego Mariners	0–2
3	April 14	San Diego Mariners	2–5	Toronto Toros	1–2
4	April 16	San Diego Mariners	5–6	Toronto Toros	2–2
5	April 18	Toronto Toros	3–4	San Diego Mariners	2–3
6	April 21	San Diego Mariners	6–4	Toronto Toros	2–4

Legend: Win Loss

== Player statistics ==
=== Regular season ===
Scoring leaders

Player	GP	G	A	Pts	PIM
Wayne Dillon	77	29	66	95	22
Frank Mahovlich	73	38	44	82	27
Vaclav Nedomansky	78	41	40	81	19
Tom Simpson	70	52	28	80	48
Gavin Kirk	78	15	58	73	69

Goaltending

Player	GP	TOI	W	L	T	GA	SO	GAA	Save %
Les Binkley	17	772	6	4	0	47	0	3.65	.888
Gilles Gratton	53	2881	30	20	1	185	2	3.85	.887
Jim Shaw	21	1055	7	9	1	70	0	3.98	.885

=== Playoffs ===
Scoring leaders

Player	GP	G	A	Pts	PIM
Gavin Kirk	6	5	6	11	2
Jim Dorey	6	2	6	8	2
Wayne Dillon	6	4	4	8	4
Lou Nistico	6	6	1	7	19
Tom Martin	5	1	5	6	0

Goaltending

Player	GP	TOI	W	L	GA	SO	GAA	Save %
Jim Shaw	5	262	2	2	18	0	4.12	
Les Binkley	1	59	0	1	5	0	5.08	
Gilles Gratton	1	36	0	1	5	0	8.33	

== Draft picks ==
Toronto's draft picks at the 1974 WHA Amateur Draft.

Round	#	Player	Nationality	College/Junior/Club team (League)
1	12	Jim Turkiewicz (D)	Canada	Peterborough Petes (OHA)
2	27	Roger Lemelin (D)	Canada	London Knights (OHA)
5	71	Carlo Torresan (D)	Canada	Sorel Black Hawks (QMJHL)
6	86	Ron Sedlbauer (LW)	Canada	Kitchener Rangers (OHA)
7	100	Gilles Lupien (D)	Canada	Montreal Red White and Blue (QMJHL)
8	115	Garth Malarchuk (G)	Canada	Calgary Centennials (WCHL)
9	130	John Harper (RW)	Canada	Cornell University (NCAA)
10	145	Joe McNeil (F)	Canada	St. Francis Xavier University (CIAU)
11	160	Jack Davies (F)	Canada	Thunder Bay Hurricanes (MJHL)
12	173	Bill Hassard (LW)	Canada	Wexford Raiders (OPJHL)

== See also ==
- 1974–75 WHA season
