= 1974–75 Quebec Nordiques season =

World Hockey Association team season

1974–75 Quebec Nordiques
- Canadian Division champions
- Division: 1st Canadian
- 1974–75 record: 46–32–0
- Home record: 27–12–0
- Road record: 19–20–0
- Goals for: 331
- Goals against: 299

Team information
- General manager: Maurice Filion
- Coach: Jean-Guy Gendron
- Captain: J.C. Tremblay
- Alternate captains: Serge Bernier; Rene LeClerc; Rejean Houle
- Arena: Colisée de Québec

Team leaders
- Goals: Serge Bernier (54)
- Assists: Serge Bernier (68)
- Points: Serge Bernier (122)
- Penalty minutes: Pierre Roy (118)
- Wins: Richard Brodeur (29)
- Goals against average: Serge Aubry (3.71)

The 1974–75 Quebec Nordiques season was the Nordiques' third season, as they were coming off a 38–36–4 record in 1973–74, earning 80 points, however, they failed to qualify for the post-season for the 2nd straight season.

The Nordiques would have to find a new head coach during the off-season, as Jacques Plante would come out of retirement and play with the Edmonton Oilers. Quebec hired recently retired and former team captain Jean-Guy Gendron to become the club's 4th head coach in team history. The club would also move from the Eastern Division to join the newly created Canadian Division, which consisted of the other 4 Canadian clubs in the league.

Quebec would start off the season very strong, and fight with the Toronto Toros for top spot in the division all season long. Through 66 games, the Nordiques had a 42–24–0 record, 8 points ahead of the 2nd place Toros, however, the team would suffer through a 7-game losing streak, and the Toros would catch up to the Nordiques. Quebec would win 4 of their final 5 games, and win the division championship, and make the playoffs for the first time in club history.

Offensively, the Nordiques were once again led by Serge Bernier, who finished 3rd in league scoring with 122 points, as he scored 54 goals and added 68 assists. Rejean Houle put together a solid season, scoring 40 goals and earning 92 points, while new team captain Michel Parizeau had 74 points. Marc Tardif, acquired by Quebec from the Michigan Stags during the season, scored 38 goals and earned 72 points in 53 games with the Nordiques. J. C. Tremblay led the blueline with 72 points in 68 games, while Dale Hoganson chipped in with 9 goals and 44 points. Pierre Roy led the club with 118 penalty minutes.

In goal, Richard Brodeur took the starters job, and won a team high 29 games while posting a 3.90 GAA in 51 games. Serge Aubry backed up Brodeur, and won 17 games with a team best 3.71 GAA.

In the opening round of the playoffs, the Nordiques faced the Phoenix Roadrunners, who finished 4th in the Western Division with 86 points, 6 fewer than Quebec. The Nordiques would win their first ever playoff game, defeating the Roadrunners 5–2 at Le Colisée. Quebec went up 2–0 in the series with a solid 6–2 win, as the series moved west to Phoenix. The Nordiques shutout the Roadrunners 3–0 to take a commanding 3–0 series lead, however, they could not complete the sweep, as Phoenix won game 4 in overtime. The series returned to Quebec for game 5, and the Nordiques would win the game 4–2, and take the series in 5 games.

Up next for the Nordiques was the Minnesota Fighting Saints, who during the season, had a 42–33–3 record, earning 87 points, as they finished 3rd in the Western Division. Minnesota defeated the New England Whalers in the first round of the playoffs. The series opened in Quebec, and the clubs split the first two games, as the series shifted to Minnesota. Quebec took a 2–1 series lead with a big 6–1 win in the 3rd game, however, the Fighting Saints fought back in game 4, evening the series with a 4–2 victory. Quebec would easily win the 5th game, doubling Minnesota 6–3 at Le Colisée, and the Nordiques would close out the series in the 6th game, defeating Minnesota 4–2, and advance to the Avco Cup Finals.

Quebec would face the defending Avco Cup champion Houston Aeros in the finals. The Aeros finished the season with a league best 106 points, and had easily beat the Cleveland Crusaders and San Diego Mariners to reach the finals. Houston, led by Larry Lund and Gordie Howe were heavy favourites to win the series. The series opened in Houston, with the Aeros defeating Quebec 6–2 in the series opener, then took a 2–0 series lead with a 5–3 win in the second game. The series moved to Quebec for the next 2 games, however, it was the Aeros who continued to win, as they shutout the Nordiques 2–0 in the third game, and would sweep Quebec with a huge 7–2 victory in the fourth game, winning the Avco Cup for the second time in as many years.

== Season standings ==
Canadian Division	GP	W	L	T	GF	GA	Pts
Quebec Nordiques	78	46	32	0	331	299	92
Toronto Toros	78	43	33	2	349	304	88
Winnipeg Jets	78	38	35	5	322	293	81
Vancouver Blazers	78	37	39	2	256	270	76
Edmonton Oilers	78	36	38	4	279	279	76

== Schedule and results ==
1974–75 regular season
October

Game	Date	Visitor	Score	Home	Record	Points
1	October 20	Indianapolis Racers	1–4	Quebec Nordiques	1–0–0	2
2	October 22	Houston Aeros	2–7	Quebec Nordiques	2–0–0	4
3	October 23	Michigan Stags	2–6	Quebec Nordiques	3–0–0	6
4	October 26	Phoenix Roadrunners	1–4	Quebec Nordiques	4–0–0	8
5	October 27	Quebec Nordiques	3–5	Indianapolis Racers	4–1–0	8

October

Game	Date	Visitor	Score	Home	Record	Points
6	November 2	Quebec Nordiques	2–4	New England Whalers	4–2–0	8
7	November 4	Quebec Nordiques	5–3	Toronto Toros	5–2–0	10
8	November 6	Vancouver Blazers	3–5	Quebec Nordiques	6–2–0	12
9	November 10	San Diego Mariners	4–3	Quebec Nordiques	6–3–0	12
10	November 12	Quebec Nordiques	5–4	Michigan Stags	7–3–0	14
11	November 13	Indianapolis Racers	3–10	Quebec Nordiques	8–3–0	16
12	November 16	Michigan Stags	3–4	Quebec Nordiques	9–3–0	18
13	November 17	Minnesota Fighting Saints	7–1	Quebec Nordiques	9–4–0	18
14	November 20	Edmonton Oilers	2–4	Quebec Nordiques	10–4–0	20
15	November 22	Cleveland Crusaders	2–3	Quebec Nordiques	11–4–0	22
16	November 23	Toronto Toros	9–2	Quebec Nordiques	11–5–0	22
17	November 24	Quebec Nordiques	1–3	Cleveland Crusaders	11–6–0	22
18	November 26	New England Whalers	5–4	Quebec Nordiques	11–7–0	22
19	November 28	Quebec Nordiques	7–5	Indianapolis Racers	12–7–0	24

December

Game	Date	Visitor	Score	Home	Record	Points
20	December 1	Quebec Nordiques	2–3	Winnipeg Jets	12–8–0	24
21	December 4	Minnesota Fighting Saints	6–3	Quebec Nordiques	12–9–0	24
22	December 5	New England Whalers	1–9	Quebec Nordiques	13–9–0	26
23	December 8	Houston Aeros	1–2	Quebec Nordiques	14–9–0	28
24	December 11	Edmonton Oilers	3–4	Quebec Nordiques	15–9–0	30
25	December 12	Cleveland Crusaders	2–5	Quebec Nordiques	16–9–0	32
26	December 14	Quebec Nordiques	4–9	New England Whalers	16–10–0	32
27	December 15	Quebec Nordiques	4–6	Minnesota Fighting Saints	16–11–0	32
28	December 17	Quebec Nordiques	6–1	Chicago Cougars	17–11–0	34
29	December 18	Winnipeg Jets	1–5	Quebec Nordiques	18–11–0	36
30	December 20	Chicago Cougars	5–3	Quebec Nordiques	18–12–0	36
31	December 22	Quebec Nordiques	2–3	Michigan Stags	18–13–0	36
32	December 27	Quebec Nordiques	3–4	Cleveland Crusaders	18–14–0	36
33	December 28	Michigan Stags	1–4	Quebec Nordiques	19–14–0	38
34	December 30	Phoenix Roadrunners	6–3	Quebec Nordiques	19–15–0	38

January

Game	Date	Visitor	Score	Home	Record	Points
35	January 1	Indianapolis Racers	3–6	Quebec Nordiques	20–15–0	40
36	January 4	Toronto Toros	1–3	Quebec Nordiques	21–15–0	42
37	January 7	Quebec Nordiques	3–2	Michigan Stags	22–15–0	44
38	January 8	Vancouver Blazers	3–4	Quebec Nordiques	23–15–0	46
39	January 10	Quebec Nordiques	6–1	Winnipeg Jets	24–15–0	48
40	January 12	Quebec Nordiques	3–1	Edmonton Oilers	25–15–0	50
41	January 14	Quebec Nordiques	6–2	Vancouver Blazers	26–15–0	52
42	January 18	New England Whalers	2–8	Quebec Nordiques	27–15–0	54
43	January 19	Quebec Nordiques	5–2	Chicago Cougars	28–15–0	56
44	January 23	Cleveland Crusaders	5–3	Quebec Nordiques	28–16–0	56
45	January 25	Chicago Cougars	4–6	Quebec Nordiques	29–16–0	58
46	January 28	Quebec Nordiques	4–6	Toronto Toros	29–17–0	58
47	January 30	Quebec Nordiques	5–2	Chicago Cougars	30–17–0	60

February

Game	Date	Visitor	Score	Home	Record	Points
48	February 1	Quebec Nordiques	2–1	Indianapolis Racers	31–17–0	62
49	February 2	Quebec Nordiques	4–3	Cleveland Crusaders	32–17–0	64
50	February 6	Quebec Nordiques	4–3	Houston Aeros	33–17–0	66
51	February 8	Quebec Nordiques	4–3	Phoenix Roadrunners	34–17–0	68
52	February 11	Quebec Nordiques	2–9	San Diego Mariners	34–18–0	68
53	February 13	Quebec Nordiques	5–3	Phoenix Roadrunners	35–18–0	70
54	February 14	Quebec Nordiques	7–3	Minnesota Fighting Saints	36–18–0	72
55	February 17	Houston Aeros	5–3	Quebec Nordiques	36–19–0	72
56	February 19	Quebec Nordiques	4–10	Houston Aeros	36–20–0	72
57	February 20	Quebec Nordiques	2–5	San Diego Mariners	36–21–0	72
58	February 23	San Diego Mariners	4–6	Quebec Nordiques	37–21–0	74
59	February 24	San Diego Mariners	3–5	Quebec Nordiques	38–21–0	76
60	February 27	Vancouver Blazers	7–9	Quebec Nordiques	39–21–0	78

March

Game	Date	Visitor	Score	Home	Record	Points
61	March 1	Minnesota Fighting Saints	4–1	Quebec Nordiques	39–22–0	78
62	March 4	Quebec Nordiques	2–8	San Diego Mariners	39–23–0	78
63	March 5	Quebec Nordiques	3–6	Phoenix Roadrunners	39–24–0	78
64	March 7	Quebec Nordiques	4–1	Toronto Toros	40–24–0	80
65	March 9	Chicago Cougars	5–7	Quebec Nordiques	41–24–0	82
66	March 12	Winnipeg Jets	3–5	Quebec Nordiques	42–24–0	84
67	March 14	Quebec Nordiques	3–4	Winnipeg Jets	42–25–0	84
68	March 15	Quebec Nordiques	4–7	Vancouver Blazers	42–26–0	84
69	March 16	Quebec Nordiques	2–4	Vancouver Blazers	42–27–0	84
70	March 18	Quebec Nordiques	5–8	Edmonton Oilers	42–28–0	84
71	March 20	Quebec Nordiques	3–5	Houston Aeros	42–29–0	84
72	March 26	Edmonton Oilers	6–4	Quebec Nordiques	42–30–0	84
73	March 29	Toronto Toros	5–4	Quebec Nordiques	42–31–0	84
74	March 30	Phoenix Roadrunners	5–6	Quebec Nordiques	43–31–0	86

April

Game	Date	Visitor	Score	Home	Record	Points
75	April 1	Quebec Nordiques	5–3	Edmonton Oilers	44–31–0	88
76	April 2	Quebec Nordiques	5–3	Minnesota Fighting Saints	45–31–0	90
77	April 3	Quebec Nordiques	1–4	New England Whalers	45–32–0	90
78	April 5	Winnipeg Jets	5–9	Quebec Nordiques	46–32–0	92

Legend: Win (2 points) Loss (0 points) Tie (1 point)

== Playoffs ==
1975 Avco Cup playoffs
Quarterfinals vs. (W4) Phoenix Roadrunners – Nordiques win 4–1

Game	Date	Visitor	Score	Home	Series
1	April 8	Phoenix Roadrunners	2–5	Quebec Nordiques	1–0
2	April 10	Phoenix Roadrunners	2–6	Quebec Nordiques	2–0
3	April 12	Quebec Nordiques	3–0	Phoenix Roadrunners	3–0
4	April 15	Quebec Nordiques	5–6	Phoenix Roadrunners	3–1
5	April 17	Phoenix Roadrunners	2–4	Quebec Nordiques	4–1

Semifinals vs. (W3) Minnesota Fighting Saints – Nordiques win 4–2

Game	Date	Visitor	Score	Home	Series
1	April 22	Minnesota Fighting Saints	1–4	Quebec Nordiques	1–0
2	April 23	Minnesota Fighting Saints	5–3	Quebec Nordiques	1–1
3	April 26	Quebec Nordiques	6–1	Minnesota Fighting Saints	2–1
4	April 27	Quebec Nordiques	2–4	Minnesota Fighting Saints	2–2
5	April 29	Minnesota Fighting Saints	3–6	Quebec Nordiques	3–2
6	May 1	Quebec Nordiques	4–2	Minnesota Fighting Saints	4–2

Avco Cup Finals vs. (W1) Houston Aeros – Aeros win 4–0

Game	Date	Visitor	Score	Home	Series
1	May 3	Quebec Nordiques	2–6	Houston Aeros	0–1
2	May 6	Quebec Nordiques	3–5	Houston Aeros	0–2
3	May 10	Houston Aeros	2–0	Quebec Nordiques	0–3
4	May 12	Houston Aeros	7–2	Quebec Nordiques	0–4

Legend: Win Loss

== Season stats ==
=== Scoring leaders ===
Player	GP	G	A	Pts	PIM
Serge Bernier	76	54	68	122	75
Rejean Houle	64	40	52	92	37
Michel Parizeau	78	28	46	74	69
Marc Tardif	53	38	34	72	70
J. C. Tremblay	68	16	56	72	18

=== Goaltending ===
Player	GP	TOI	W	L	T	GA	SO	GAA	Save %
Serge Aubry	31	1762	17	11	0	109	0	3.71	.886
Richard Brodeur	51	2938	29	21	0	188	0	3.84	.892

== Playoff stats ==
=== Scoring leaders ===
Player	GP	G	A	Pts	PIM
Marc Tardif	15	10	11	21	10
Rejean Houle	15	10	6	16	2
Serge Bernier	15	8	8	16	6
Chris Bordeleau	15	2	13	15	2
Rene LeClerc	14	7	7	14	41

=== Goaltending ===
Player	GP	TOI	W	L	GA	SO	GAA
Richard Brodeur	15	906	8	7	48	1	3.18

== Draft picks ==
Quebec's draft picks at the 1974 WHA Amateur Draft.

Round	#	Player	Nationality	College/Junior/Club team (League)
WHA Secret Amateur Draft
1	12	Alain Daigle	Canada	Trois-Rivières Ducs (QMJHL)
WHA Amateur Draft
1	9	Real Cloutier	Canada	Quebec Remparts (QMJHL)
2	24	Charles Constantin	Canada	Quebec Remparts (QMJHL)
4	54	Jean Bernier	Canada	Shawinigan Dynamos (QMJHL)
5	68	Dave Logan	Canada	Laval National (QMJHL)
6	83	Michel Bergeron	Canada	Sorel Black Hawks (QMJHL)
7	98	Denis Carufel	Canada	Sorel Black Hawks (QMJHL)
8	113	Claude Dupuis	Canada	Laval National (QMJHL)
9	128	Mario Lessard	Canada	Sherbrooke Castors (QMJHL)
10	141	Claude Arvisais	Canada	Shawinigan Dynamos (QMJHL)
