= List of San Diego Mariners (WHA) players =

This is a list of players who played at least one game for the San Diego Mariners of the World Hockey Association from 1974–75 to 1976–77.

== A ==
Ray Adduono,

== B ==
Jamie Bateman, Bob Blanchet, Ken Block, Gregg Boddy, Dean Boylan, Brian Bradley, Gary Bredin, Don Burgess, Brian Bye,

== C ==
Tony Cassolato, Norm Cournoyer,

== D ==
Kevin Devine, Bob Dobek,

== F ==
Bob Falkenberg, Norm Ferguson, John French,

== G ==
Russ Gillow, Bill Goldthorpe,

== H ==
Jocelyn Hardy, Jim Hargreaves, Larry Hornung, Harry Howell, Brent Hughes,

== I ==
Lee Inglis,

== J ==
Gary Jacquith, Joe Junkin,

== K ==
Reg Krezanski,

== L ==
Andre Lacroix, Rick Lalonde, Mike Laughton, Randy Legge, Ken Lockett,

== M ==
Mike McMahon, Peter McNamee, Brian Morenz, Kevin Morrison,

== N ==
Joe Noris,

== O ==
Tim O'Connell,

== P ==
Gene Peacosh, Brian Perry, Gerry Pinder, Ron Plumb,

== R ==
Craig Reichmuth, Brad Rhiness, Wayne Rivers, Michel Rouleau,

== S ==
Ted Scharf, Rick Sentes, Paul Shmyr,

== T ==
Alex Tidey, Tom Trevelyan,

== V ==
Gary Veneruzzo, Doug Volmar,

== W ==
Ernie Wakely, Bob Wall, Dave Walter, Bob Winograd,
