= 1974–75 San Diego Mariners season =

World Hockey Association team season

1974–75 San Diego Mariners
- Division: 2nd West
- 1974–75 record: 43–31–4
- Home record: 26–11–2
- Road record: 17–20–2
- Goals for: 326
- Goals against: 268

Team information
- Coach: Harry Howell
- Captain: Norm Ferguson
- Alternate captains: Ken Block; Andre Lacroix
- Arena: San Diego Sports Arena

Team leaders
- Goals: Wayne Rivers (54)
- Assists: Andre Lacroix (106)
- Points: Andre Lacroix (147)
- Penalty minutes: Kevin Morrison (143)
- Wins: Ernie Wakely (20)
- Goals against average: Joe Junkin (3.29)

The 1974–75 San Diego Mariners season was the first season of operation of the San Diego Mariners in the World Hockey Association (WHA). The franchise was formerly named the Jersey Knights and was transferred to San Diego. The Mariners qualified for the playoffs, winning the first round before losing in the second round to the Houston Aeros.

== Offseason ==
After two seasons in the greater New York City area as the New York Raiders, New York Golden Blades and Jersey Knights, the franchise relocated to the city of San Diego, California.

== Regular season ==
=== Final standings ===
Western Division	GP	W	L	T	Pts	GF	GA	PIM
Houston Aeros	78	53	25	0	106	369	247	1257
San Diego Mariners	78	43	31	4	90	326	268	1058
Minnesota Fighting Saints	78	42	33	3	87	308	279	1233
Phoenix Roadrunners	78	39	31	8	86	300	265	1388
Michigan Stags / Baltimore Blades	78	21	53	4	46	205	341	1104

== Schedule and results ==
1974–75 regular season
October

Game	Result	Date	Score	Opponent	Record
1	L	October 16, 1974	2–8	@ Phoenix Roadrunners (1974–75)	0–1–0
2	W	October 19, 1974	6–2	Houston Aeros (1974–75)	1–1–0
3	W	October 22, 1974	5–2	Cleveland Crusaders (1974–75)	2–1–0
4	W	October 24, 1974	2–1	Phoenix Roadrunners (1974–75)	3–1–0
5	W	October 31, 1974	4–3	Chicago Cougars (1974–75)	4–1–0

November

Game	Result	Date	Score	Opponent	Record
6	W	November 3, 1974	6–2	@ Vancouver Blazers (1974–75)	5–1–0
7	L	November 5, 1974	3–9	@ Houston Aeros (1974–75)	5–2–0
8	L	November 7, 1974	0–3	@ Indianapolis Racers (1974–75)	5–3–0
9	L	November 8, 1974	0–3	@ New England Whalers (1974–75)	5–4–0
10	W	November 10, 1974	4–3	@ Quebec Nordiques (1974–75)	6–4–0
11	W	November 12, 1974	4–2	@ Chicago Cougars (1974–75)	7–4–0
12	L	November 14, 1974	2–7	New England Whalers (1974–75)	7–5–0
13	L	November 15, 1974	3–5	Cleveland Crusaders (1974–75)	7–6–0
14	W	November 17, 1974	4–3	@ Houston Aeros (1974–75)	8–6–0
15	W	November 19, 1974	3–2	Vancouver Blazers (1974–75)	9–6–0
16	W	November 23, 1974	5–3	@ Minnesota Fighting Saints (1974–75)	10–6–0
17	W	November 26, 1974	5–1	Edmonton Oilers (1974–75)	11–6–0
18	L	November 28, 1974	2–3	Chicago Cougars (1974–75)	11–7–0

December

Game	Result	Date	Score	Opponent	Record
19	L	December 1, 1974	1–3	Toronto Toros (1974–75)	11–8–0
20	L	December 3, 1974	4–5 OT	Phoenix Roadrunners (1974–75)	11–9–0
21	W	December 4, 1974	2–0	@ Phoenix Roadrunners (1974–75)	12–9–0
22	L	December 5, 1974	3–5	@ Michigan Stags/Baltimore Blades (1974–75)	12–10–0
23	L	December 7, 1974	1–3	@ Cleveland Crusaders (1974–75)	12–11–0
24	L	December 8, 1974	3–5	@ Indianapolis Racers (1974–75)	12–12–0
25	T	December 10, 1974	4–4	Michigan Stags/Baltimore Blades (1974–75)	12–12–1
26	W	December 14, 1974	2–0	Indianapolis Racers (1974–75)	13–12–1
27	W	December 15, 1974	4–3	@ Houston Aeros (1974–75)	14–12–1
28	W	December 17, 1974	8–3	Cleveland Crusaders (1974–75)	15–12–1
29	L	December 19, 1974	6–7 OT	Edmonton Oilers (1974–75)	15–13–1
30	L	December 21, 1974	1–2	@ Vancouver Blazers (1974–75)	15–14–1
31	L	December 22, 1974	3–6	@ Edmonton Oilers (1974–75)	15–15–1
32	L	December 28, 1974	4–6	Winnipeg Jets (1974–75)	15–16–1

January

Game	Result	Date	Score	Opponent	Record
33	L	January 1, 1975	2–3 OT	@ Edmonton Oilers (1974–75)	15–17–1
34	W	January 3, 1975	2–1	@ Minnesota Fighting Saints (1974–75)	16–17–1
35	W	January 4, 1975	2–0	@ Cleveland Crusaders (1974–75)	17–17–1
36	W	January 7, 1975	5–3	New England Whalers (1974–75)	18–17–1
37	L	January 10, 1975	3–4	@ Toronto Toros (1974–75)	18–18–1
38	L	January 11, 1975	3–4 OT	@ New England Whalers (1974–75)	18–19–1
39	W	January 14, 1975	6–4	Toronto Toros (1974–75)	19–19–1
40	W	January 16, 1975	3–2	Edmonton Oilers (1974–75)	20–19–1
41	W	January 18, 1975	5–4 OT	Houston Aeros (1974–75)	21–19–1
42	W	January 23, 1975	6–1	Vancouver Blazers (1974–75)	22–19–1
43	W	January 25, 1975	6–2	New England Whalers (1974–75)	23–19–1
44	L	January 28, 1975	7–9	Winnipeg Jets (1974–75)	23–20–1

February

Game	Result	Date	Score	Opponent	Record
45	W	February 4, 1975	8–4	Toronto Toros (1974–75)	24–20–1
46	L	February 5, 1975	2–9	@ Phoenix Roadrunners (1974–75)	24–21–1
47	T	February 6, 1975	2–2	Minnesota Fighting Saints (1974–75)	24–21–2
48	W	February 8, 1975	8–4	Minnesota Fighting Saints (1974–75)	25–21–2
49	W	February 11, 1975	9–2	Quebec Nordiques (1974–75)	26–21–2
50	W	February 13, 1975	6–1	@ Michigan Stags/Baltimore Blades (1974–75)	27–21–2
51	L	February 14, 1975	2–3	@ Cleveland Crusaders (1974–75)	27–22–2
52	L	February 16, 1975	2–5	@ Minnesota Fighting Saints (1974–75)	27–23–2
53	W	February 18, 1975	7–0	Phoenix Roadrunners (1974–75)	28–23–2
54	W	February 20, 1975	5–2	Quebec Nordiques (1974–75)	29–23–2
55	L	February 23, 1975	4–6	@ Quebec Nordiques (1974–75)	29–24–2
56	L	February 24, 1975	3–5	@ Quebec Nordiques (1974–75)	29–25–2
57	L	February 25, 1975	4–6	@ Toronto Toros (1974–75)	29–26–2
58	L	February 28, 1975	3–4	@ Winnipeg Jets (1974–75)	29–27–2

March

Game	Result	Date	Score	Opponent	Record
59	T	March 2, 1975	4–4	@ Winnipeg Jets (1974–75)	29–27–3
60	W	March 4, 1975	8–2	Quebec Nordiques (1974–75)	30–27–3
61	W	March 6, 1975	7–4	Houston Aeros (1974–75)	31–27–3
62	W	March 8, 1975	6–5	Winnipeg Jets (1974–75)	32–27–3
63	L	March 11, 1975	4–6	Minnesota Fighting Saints (1974–75)	32–28–3
64	W	March 14, 1975	6–4	@ Toronto Toros (1974–75)	33–28–3
65	L	March 16, 1975	2–4	@ Chicago Cougars (1974–75)	33–29–3
66	W	March 19, 1975	6–1	@ New England Whalers (1974–75)	34–29–3
67	L	March 20, 1975	2–4	Chicago Cougars (1974–75)	34–30–3
68	W	March 22, 1975	6–3	Indianapolis Racers (1974–75)	35–30–3
69	W	March 23, 1975	1–0 OT	Vancouver Blazers (1974–75)	36–30–3
70	W	March 25, 1975	6–4	@ Chicago Cougars (1974–75)	37–30–3
71	W	March 26, 1975	5–2	@ Michigan Stags/Baltimore Blades (1974–75)	38–30–3
72	W	March 27, 1975	5–2	@ Indianapolis Racers (1974–75)	39–30–3
73	W	March 29, 1975	7–3	@ Vancouver Blazers (1974–75)	40–30–3
74	W	March 31, 1975	5–2	@ Edmonton Oilers (1974–75)	41–30–3

April

Game	Result	Date	Score	Opponent	Record
75	L	April 1, 1975	3–4	Michigan Stags/Baltimore Blades (1974–75)	41–31–3
76	W	April 3, 1975	9–2	Michigan Stags/Baltimore Blades (1974–75)	42–31–3
77	W	April 5, 1975	8–3	Indianapolis Racers (1974–75)	43–31–3
78	T	April 6, 1975	5–5	@ Winnipeg Jets (1974–75)	43–31–4

Legend: Win (2 points) Loss (0 points) Tie (1 point)

== Playoffs ==
1975 Avco Cup playoffs
Quarterfinals vs. Toronto Toros – Mariners win 4–2

Game	Date	Visitor	Score	Home	Series
1	April 9	Toronto Toros	3–5	San Diego Mariners	1–0
2	April 12	Toronto Toros	6–7	San Diego Mariners	2–0
3	April 14	San Diego Mariners	2–5	Toronto Toros	2–1
4	April 16	San Diego Mariners	5–6	Toronto Toros	2–2
5	April 18	Toronto Toros	3–4	San Diego Mariners	3–2
6	April 21	San Diego Mariners	6–4	Toronto Toros	4–2

Semifinals vs. Houston Aeros – Aeros win 4–0

Game	Date	Visitor	Score	Home	Series
1	April 25	Houston Aeros	4–0	San Diego Mariners	1–0
2	April 27	Houston Aeros	2–1	San Diego Mariners	2–0
3	April 29	San Diego Mariners	0–6	Houston Aeros	3–0
4	May 1	San Diego Mariners	4–5 OT	Houston Aeros	4–0

Legend: Win Loss

== Player statistics ==
Regular season
Scoring

Player	Pos	GP	G	A	Pts	PIM	+/-	PPG	SHG	GWG
Andre Lacroix	C	78	41	106	147	63	40	12	0	0
Wayne Rivers	RW	78	54	53	107	52	29	13	0	0
Dick Sentes	LW	74	44	41	85	52	44	6	1	0
Kevin Morrison	D	78	20	61	81	143	29	7	1	0
Gene Peacosh	LW	78	43	36	79	22	13	12	0	0
Ray Adduono	C	78	15	59	74	23	27	1	0	0
Norm Ferguson	RW	78	36	33	69	6	22	2	0	0
Ron Plumb	D	78	10	38	48	56	18	1	1	0
Brian Morenz	C	78	20	19	39	76	-5	0	2	0
Bob Falkenberg	D	78	2	18	20	42	4	0	0	0
Jim Hargreaves	D	41	8	10	18	45	4	0	0	0
Mike Laughton	C	65	8	9	17	22	-12	0	3	0
Kevin Devine	LW	46	4	10	14	48	-4	1	0	0
Harry Howell	D	74	4	10	14	28	28	0	1	0
Ken Block	D	36	1	11	12	12	-4	1	0	0
Michel Rouleau	C	27	5	6	11	42	1	0	0	0
Brian Bradley	LW	34	4	5	9	6	-7	0	0	0
Bob Wall	D	33	0	9	9	15	13	0	0	0
Joe Hardy	C	12	2	3	5	22	0	0	0	0
Ted Scharf	RW	67	3	1	4	94	-6	0	0	0
Craig Reichmuth	LW	28	2	1	3	58	0	0	0	0
Jamie Bateman	LW	24	0	3	3	96	-4	0	0	0
Lee Inglis	LW	5	0	2	2	0	0	0	0	0
Tom Trevelyan	C	20	0	2	2	4	0	0	0	0
Russ Gillow	G	30	0	1	1	4	0	0	0	0
Joe Junkin	G	16	0	1	1	2	0	0	0	0
Doug Volmar	RW	10	0	1	1	4	0	0	0	0
Bob Blanchet	G	3	0	0	0	0	0	0	0	0
Dean Boylan	D	3	0	0	0	10	0	0	0	0
Reg Krezanski	D	2	0	0	0	2	0	0	0	0
Ernie Wakely	G	35	0	0	0	0	0	0	0	0

Goaltending

Player	MIN	GP	W	L	T	GA	GAA	SO
Ernie Wakely	2062	35	20	12	2	115	3.35	2
Russ Gillow	1653	30	15	11	2	94	3.41	1
Joe Junkin	839	16	6	7	0	46	3.29	1
Bob Blanchet	179	3	2	1	0	7	2.35	1
Team:	4733	78	43	31	4	262	3.32	5

Playoffs
Scoring

Player	Pos	GP	G	A	Pts	PIM	PPG	SHG	GWG
Ray Adduono	C	10	5	9	14	13	0	0	0
Gene Peacosh	LW	10	7	5	12	4	0	0	2
Andre Lacroix	C	10	3	9	12	2	0	0	0
Norm Ferguson	RW	10	6	5	11	0	0	0	0
Kevin Morrison	D	10	0	7	7	2	0	0	0
Mike Laughton	C	10	4	1	5	0	0	0	0
Ron Plumb	D	10	2	3	5	19	0	0	0
Wayne Rivers	RW	6	3	1	4	8	0	0	2
Brian Perry	C	6	1	2	3	6	0	0	0
Brian Morenz	C	10	0	3	3	8	0	0	0
Bob Wall	D	10	0	3	3	2	0	0	0
Dick Sentes	LW	10	0	2	2	0	0	0	0
Kevin Devine	LW	10	1	0	1	14	0	0	0
Jim Hargreaves	D	10	1	0	1	6	0	0	0
Harry Howell	D	5	1	0	1	10	0	0	0
Brian Bradley	LW	6	0	1	1	2	0	0	0
Bob Falkenberg	D	10	0	1	1	4	0	0	0
Jamie Bateman	LW	5	0	0	0	16	0	0	0
Russ Gillow	G	3	0	0	0	0	0	0	0
Joe Hardy	C	3	0	0	0	0	0	0	0
Michel Rouleau	C	3	0	0	0	4	0	0	0
Ted Scharf	RW	7	0	0	0	0	0	0	0
Ernie Wakely	G	10	0	0	0	0	0	0	0

Goaltending

Player	MIN	GP	W	L	GA	GAA	SO
Russ Gillow	79	3	4	6	5	3.80	0
Ernie Wakely	520	10	0	0	39	4.50	0
Team:	599	10	4	6	44	4.41	0

Note: Pos = Position; GP = Games played; G = Goals; A = Assists; Pts = Points; +/- = plus/minus; PIM = Penalty minutes; PPG = Power-play goals; SHG = Short-handed goals; GWG = Game-winning goals
MIN = Minutes played; W = Wins; L = Losses; T = Ties; GA = Goals-against; GAA = Goals-against average; SO = Shutouts;

== Draft picks ==
San Diego's draft picks at the 1974 WHA Amateur Draft.

Round	#	Player	Nationality	College/Junior/Club team (League)
WHA Secret Amateur Draft
1	6	Rick Chartraw (D)	United States	Kitchener Rangers (OHA)
WHA Amateur Draft
1	6	Brad Rhiness (C)	Canada	Kingston Canadians (OHA)
2	21	Kevin Devine (LW)	Canada	Toronto Marlboros (OHA)
3	36	Jim Warden (G)	United States	Michigan Tech (WCHA)
4	51	Jamie Bateman (F)	Canada	Quebec Remparts (QMJHL)
4	56	Derrick Emerson (F)	Canada	Montreal Red White and Blue (QMJHL)
5	65	Mike Boland (D)	Canada	Sault Ste. Marie Greyhounds (OHA)
6	80	Ray Maluta (D)	Canada	Flin Flon Bombers (WCHL)
7	95	Greg Holst (C)	Austria	Kingston Canadians (OHA)
8	110	Mike McKegney (F)	Canada	Kitchener Rangers (OHA)
9	125	Brian Bye (C)	Canada	Kitchener Rangers (OHA)
11	153	Firmin Royer (C)	Canada	Sorel Black Hawks (QMJHL)
12	166	Bob Elinesky (D)	Canada	Chatham Maroons (SOJHL)
13	178	Mitch Giroux (RW)	Canada	Guelph Biltmore Mad Hatters (SOJHL)
14	188	Bob Blanchet (G)	Canada	Kitchener Rangers (OHA)

== See also ==
- 1974–75 WHA season
