= List of Indianapolis Racers players =

This is a list of players who played at least one game for the Indianapolis Racers of the World Hockey Association (WHA) from the 1974–75 to 1978.

== A ==
- Ray Adduono
- Steve Andrascik
- Bob Ash

== B ==
- Bryon Baltimore
- Bill Blackwood
- Ken Block
- Kerry Bond
- Gary Bredin
- Andy Brown
- Ron Buchanan
- Randy Burchell
- Don Burgess

== C ==
- Bryan Campbell
- Kim Clackson
- Brian Coates
- Charles Constantin
- Roger Cote
- Glenn Critch

== D ==
- Ken Desjardine
- Kevin Devine
- Michel Dion
- Dave Dornseif
- Peter Driscoll
- Michel Dubois
- Ed Dyck

== F ==
- Bob Fitchner
- Dave Fortier
- Rick Fraser
- John French

== G ==
- Wes George
- Bill Goldsworthy
- Bruce Greig
- Wayne Gretzky

== H ==
- Craig Hanmer
- Nick Harbaruk
- Joe Hardy
- Jim Hargreaves
- Hugh Harris
- Murray Heatley
- Paul Hoganson
- Leif Holmqvist
- Ralph Hopiavuori
- Bill Horton
- John Hughes

== I ==
- Dave Inkpen
- Gary Inness
- Glen Irwin

== J ==
- Jim Johnson
- Bob Jones

== K ==
- Gordon Kannegiesser
- Al Karlander
- Murray Kennett
- Dave Keon

== L ==
- Claude Larose
- Don Larway
- Rene LeClerc
- Rich Leduc
- Gerry Leroux
- Jacques Locas
- Mark Lomenda

== M ==
- Blair MacDonald
- Gary MacGregor
- Dean Magee
- Darryl Maggs
- Gilles Marotte
- Larry Mavety
- Brian McDonald
- Peter McDuffe
- Brian McKenzie
- Al McLeod
- Mark Messier
- Eddie Mio
- Angie Moretto
- Kevin Morrison
- Dave Morrow

== N ==
- Kevin Nugent

== P ==
- Rosaire Paiement
- Michel Parizeau
- Jim Park
- Ed "Rusty" Patenaude
- Gene Peacosh
- Lynn Powis
- Bill Prentice
- Dick Proceviat
- Rich Pumple

== R ==
- Brad Rhiness
- Steve Richardson
- Joe Robertson
- Frank Rochon
- Jerry Rollins
- Bob Roselle

== S ==
- Larry Sacharuk
- Ted Scharf
- Bobby Sheehan
- John Sheridan
- Bob Sicinski
- Dale Smedsmo
- Gary Smith
- Ross Smith
- Frank Spring
- Claude St. Sauveur
- Pat Stapleton
- Blaine Stoughton

== T ==
- Reg Thomas

== W ==
- Ron Walters
- Bob Whitlock
- Barry Wilkins
- Jim Wiste
- Bob Woytowich
- Randy Wyrozub

== Z ==
- Mike Zuke

== See also ==
- List of NHL players
