= WHA players with 100-point seasons =

World Hockey Association records

In the lifespan of the World Hockey Association (WHA), 24 ice hockey players scored at least 100 points in a single WHA regular season.

Collectively, these players achieved this feat on 51 occasions, playing for 12 franchises from the 1972–73 WHA season to the 1978–79 WHA season prior to the merger with the National Hockey League (NHL) that saw four teams (Hartford Whalers, Winnipeg Jets, Edmonton Oilers, Quebec Nordiques) join the NHL.

== Season achievements ==
In the first season of play, eight players achieved the 100-point mark in the upstart league. In the seven WHA seasons, the fewest number of 100-point scorers came in the 1973–74 season when three players achieved the mark.

The 1975–76 WHA season saw the first (and so far only) team in major professional history to have five players break 100 points: Marc Tardif, Réal Cloutier, Christian Bordeleau, Serge Bernier and Réjean Houle did so for the Quebec Nordiques.

== Player achievements ==
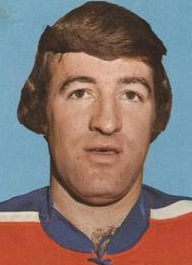
Ron Ward was the first World Hockey Association player to record 100 points in a season, doing so on March 3 of the 1972-73 WHA season.

The very first player to achieve 100 points in a season was Ron Ward, who did so on March 3, 1973 for the New York Raiders against the Cleveland Crusaders at home in Madison Square Garden on his 44th goal of the season. Notably, Bobby Hull joined the 100 point club on March 25 despite missing 15 games due to legal action over his arrival in the WHA. André Lacroix won the first points title with 124 points (with 26 of them coming in the last 14 games).

The player with the most 100-point seasons in WHA history was André Lacroix, who had six consecutive 100-point seasons from 1972 to 1978. He had the only 100-assist season in WHA history in the 1974–75 WHA season. On exactly one season was a player traded during a 100-point season: Wayne Gretzky, who played for both the Indianapolis Racers and Edmonton Oilers in the 1978-79 season. Lacroix was the only player to score 100 points in a season for a relocated franchise, which occurred in the 1973–74 WHA season when the New York Golden Blades relocated to become the Jersey Knights.

In the offense-happy WHA, a 100-point scorer won the Gordie Howe Trophy for most valuable play in all but the final season of existence, with the points leader being awarded the Bill Hunter Trophy every season. Marc Tardif set a professional record for points scored in a season in the 1977–78 WHA season with 154 points by way of 65 goals and 89 assists. Tardif played the fewest number of games in a 100-point season in the 1976–77 WHA season with 62 while Anders Hedberg played the fewest number for exactly 100 points with 65 in the 1974–75 WHA season.

== Team achievements ==
The Winnipeg Jets had the most incidents of a player achieving 100 points during the franchise's history, with 16 while the Quebec Nordiques were second with 12.

== Players and their 100-point seasons ==
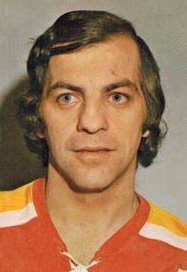
Andre Lacroix had a 100-point season in six consecutive seasons for four different cities: Philadelphia, New York, San Diego, and Houston. He is the all-time WHA points leader.

Legend
Team – Team for which the player acquired 100 points or more
GP – Games played
G – Goals
A – Assists

Won Bill Hunter Trophy for most points
Won Gary L. Davidson Award / Gordie Howe Trophy for most valuable play
Inducted into the Hockey Hall of Fame

Player	Team	Season	GP	G	A	Pts.
Anders Hedberg	Winnipeg Jets	1974–75	65	53	47	100
Anders Hedberg	Winnipeg Jets	1975–76	76	50	55	105
Anders Hedberg	Winnipeg Jets	1976–77	68	70	61	131
Anders Hedberg	Winnipeg Jets	1977–78	77	63	59	122
André Lacroix	Philadelphia Blazers	1972–73	78	50	74	124
André Lacroix	New York Golden Blades/Jersey Knights	1973–74	71	31	80	111
André Lacroix	San Diego Mariners	1974–75	78	41	106	147
André Lacroix	San Diego Mariners	1975–76	80	29	72	101
André Lacroix	San Diego Mariners	1976–77	81	32	82	114
André Lacroix	Houston Aeros	1977–78	78	36	77	113
Blaine Stoughton	Cincinnati Stingers	1976–77	81	52	52	104
Bobby Hull	Winnipeg Jets	1972–73	63	51	52	103
Bobby Hull	Winnipeg Jets	1974–75	78	77	65	142
Bobby Hull	Winnipeg Jets	1975–76	80	53	70	123
Bobby Hull	Winnipeg Jets	1977–78	77	46	71	117
Christian Bordeleau	Winnipeg Jets	1972–73	78	47	54	101
Christian Bordeleau	Quebec Nordiques	1975–76	74	37	72	109
Christian Bordeleau	Quebec Nordiques	1976–77	72	32	75	107
Danny Lawson	Philadelphia Blazers	1972–73	78	61	45	106
Gordie Howe	Houston Aeros	1973–74	70	31	69	100
Gordie Howe	Houston Aeros	1975–76	78	32	70	102
Kent Nilsson	Winnipeg Jets	1977–78	80	42	65	107
Kent Nilsson	Winnipeg Jets	1978–79	78	39	68	107
Larry Lund	Houston Aeros	1974–75	78	33	75	108
Marc Tardif	Quebec Nordiques	1975–76	81	71	77	148
Marc Tardif	Quebec Nordiques	1976–77	62	49	60	109
Marc Tardif	Quebec Nordiques	1977–78	78	65	89	154
Mark Howe	New England Whalers	1978–79	77	42	65	107
Mike Walton	Minnesota Fighting Saints	1973–74	78	57	60	117
Norm Beaudin	Winnipeg Jets	1972–73	78	38	65	103
Réal Cloutier	Quebec Nordiques	1975–76	80	60	54	114
Réal Cloutier	Quebec Nordiques	1976–77	76	66	75	141
Réal Cloutier	Quebec Nordiques	1977–78	73	56	73	129
Réal Cloutier	Quebec Nordiques	1978–79	77	75	54	129
Réjean Houle	Quebec Nordiques	1975–76	81	51	52	103
Rich LeDuc	Cincinnati Stingers	1976–77	81	52	55	107
Robbie Ftorek	Phoenix Roadrunners	1975–76	80	41	72	113
Robbie Ftorek	Phoenix Roadrunners	1976–77	80	46	71	117
Robbie Ftorek	Cincinnati Stingers	1977–78	80	59	50	109
Robbie Ftorek	Cincinnati Stingers	1978–79	80	39	77	116
Ron Ward	New York Raiders	1972–73	77	51	67	118
Serge Bernier	Quebec Nordiques	1974–75	76	54	68	122
Serge Bernier	Quebec Nordiques	1975–76	70	34	68	102
Terry Caffery	New England Whalers	1972–73	74	39	61	100
Tom Webster	New England Whalers	1972–73	77	53	50	103
Ulf Nilsson	Winnipeg Jets	1974–75	78	26	94	120
Ulf Nilsson	Winnipeg Jets	1975–76	78	38	76	114
Ulf Nilsson	Winnipeg Jets	1976–77	71	39	85	124
Ulf Nilsson	Winnipeg Jets	1977–78	73	37	89	126
Wayne Gretzky	Indianapolis Racers/Edmonton Oilers	1978–79	80	46	64	110
Wayne Rivers	San Diego Mariners	1974–75	78	54	53	107

== Most 100-point seasons ==
100-pt seasons	Player	Team(s)	Seasons
6	Andre Lacroix	Philadelphia Blazers (1), New York Golden Blades/Jersey Knights (1), San Diego Mariners (3), Houston Aeros (1)	1972–73, 1973–74, 1974–75, 1975–76, 1976–77, 1977–78
4	Bobby Hull	Winnipeg Jets	1972–73, 1974–75, 1975–76, 1977–78
4	Anders Hedberg	Winnipeg Jets	1974–75, 1975–76, 1976–77, 1977–78
4	Ulf Nilsson	Winnipeg Jets	1974–75, 1975–76, 1976–77, 1977–78
4	Réal Cloutier	Quebec Nordiques	1975–76, 1976–77, 1977–78, 1978–79
4	Robbie Ftorek	Phoenix Roadrunners (2), Cincinnati Stingers (2)	1975–76, 1976–77, 1977–78, 1978–79
3	Marc Tardif	Quebec Nordiques	1975–76, 1976–77, 1977–78
3	Christian Bordeleau	Winnipeg Jets (1), Quebec Nordiques (2)	1972–73, 1975–76, 1976–77
2	Gordie Howe	Houston Aeros	1973–74, 1975–76
2	Kent Nilsson	Winnipeg Jets	1977–78, 1978–79
2	Serge Bernier	Quebec Nordiques	1974–75, 1975–76

== See also ==
- List of WHA players with 50-goal seasons
