= Brian Morenz =

Canadian ice hockey player

- Born: May 1, 1949 (age 77) Brampton, Ontario, Canada
- Height: 5 ft 10 in (178 cm)
- Weight: 185 lb (84 kg; 13 st 3 lb)
- Position: Centre
- Played for: New York Raiders; New York Golden Blades/Jersey Knights; San Diego Mariners
- NHL draft: 21st overall, 1966; Chicago Black Hawks
- Playing career: 1972–1979

Brian Morenz (born May 11, 1949) is a Canadian retired professional ice hockey Centre. He played professionally in the World Hockey Association (WHA) with the New York Raiders, New York Golden Blades, and Jersey Knights franchise as well as the San Diego Mariners. He is a distant cousin of Howie Morenz, the Montreal Canadiens great.

== Playing career ==
Morenz was born in Brampton, Ontario, Canada. He played in the 1961 Quebec International Pee-Wee Hockey Tournament with his hometown youth team. Morenz played junior hockey with the Oshawa Generals of the Ontario Hockey Association (OHA) from 1965 to 1968. He was drafted by the Chicago Black Hawks 21st overall in the 1966 NHL Amateur Draft. He was a member of the 1966 OHA champion Generals, but he did not play with the team in the Memorial Cup final as he was recovering from a fractured skull. After junior, he moved on to university, playing with the University of Denver Pioneers from 1968 until 1972. In 1972, he was drafted by the New York Raiders in the 1972 WHA Player Selection Draft, then started his pro career with the Raiders in 1972–73. He stayed with the franchise for four seasons, as it became the New York Golden Blades and New Jersey Golden Knights, then moved to San Diego to become the San Diego Mariners. He sat out the 1976–77 season after the Mariners folded. He returned to hockey in 1976 with the San Diego Sharks and finished his hockey career with the San Diego Hawks of the Pacific Hockey League in 1978–79. He played 223 games in the WHA, scoring 53 goals and 57 assists for 110 points.

== Awards ==
- OHA champion Oshawa Generals, 1966
- NCAA Champion University of Denver Pioneers, 1969
- Brampton Sports Hall of Fame, 1991

== Career statistics ==
=== Regular season and playoffs ===
			Regular season					Playoffs
Season	Team	League	GP	G	A	Pts	PIM	GP	G	A	Pts	PIM
1965–66	Oshawa Generals	OHA	48	15	17	32	26	—	—	—	—	—
1966–67	Oshawa Generals	OHA	48	9	16	25	33	—	—	—	—	—
1967–68	Oshawa Generals	OHA	53	18	20	38	59	—	—	—	—	—
1969–70	University of Denver	WCHA	32	17	24	41	48	—	—	—	—	—
1970–71	University of Denver	WCHA	36	15	19	34	39	—	—	—	—	—
1971–72	University of Denver	WCHA	––	10	35	45	74	—	—	—	—	—
1972–73	New York Raiders	WHA	30	7	1	8	23	—	—	—	—	—
1973–74	New York Golden Blades/Jersey Knights	WHA	75	20	30	50	44	—	—	—	—	—
1974–75	San Diego Mariners	WHA	78	20	19	39	76	10	0	3	3	8
1975–76	San Diego Mariners	WHA	40	6	7	13	22	11	2	1	3	11
1978–79	San Diego Hawks	PHL	58	33	31	64	35	—	—	—	—	—
WHA totals			223	53	57	110	165	21	2	4	6	19
