= Jacquith =

Jacquith is a surname. Notable people with the surname include:

- Gary Jacquith (born 1948), American ice hockey player
- Jim Jacquith (1898–1960), American football player

== See also ==
- Jaquith (disambiguation)
