= Bob Winograd =

Canadian ice hockey player (1950–2026)

- Born: June 6, 1950 Winnipeg, Manitoba, Canada
- Died: June 15, 2026 (aged 76)
- Height: 5 ft 11 in (180 cm)
- Weight: 195 lb (88 kg; 13 st 13 lb)
- Position: Defence
- Played for: New York Raiders; New York Golden Blades/Jersey Knights; San Diego Mariners
- NHL draft: 108th overall, 1970; St. Louis Blues
- Playing career: 1972–1977

Robert Earl Winograd (June 6, 1950 – June 15, 2026) was a Canadian professional ice hockey player. He played professionally in the World Hockey Association (WHA), the North American Hockey League and the American Hockey League from 1972 until 1977. Born in Winnipeg, Manitoba, Winograd played junior hockey in his hometown. He then went to college at Colorado College. After one season at college, he was drafted by the St. Louis Blues in the ninth round (108th overall) of the 1970 NHL Amateur Draft. After college, he joined the New York Raiders of the WHA for the 1972–73 season. The following season, he played for the New York Golden Blades/Jersey Knights of the WHA and several minor league teams. He returned to the WHA for one season in 1976–77 with the San Diego Mariners. Winograd died on June 15, 2026, at the age of 76.

== Career statistics ==
=== Regular season and playoffs ===
			Regular season					Playoffs
Season	Team	League	GP	G	A	Pts	PIM	GP	G	A	Pts	PIM
1968–69	Winnipeg Monarchs	MJHL	32	18	23	41	0	––	––	––	––	––
1969–70	Colorado College	WCHA	30	9	13	22	47	––	––	––	––	––
1970–71	Colorado College	WCHA	20	14	13	27	18	––	––	––	––	––
1971–72	Colorado College	WCHA	32	18	38	56	38	––	––	––	––	––
1972–73	Long Island Ducks	EHL	12	2	8	10	6	––	––	––	––	––
1972–73	New York Raiders	WHA	52	0	12	12	23	––	––	––	––	––
1973–74	Jacksonville Barons	AHL	12	2	1	3	6	––	––	––	––	––
1973–74	Syracuse Blazers	NAHL	38	7	15	22	12	4	0	0	0	0
1973–74	Greensboro Generals	SHL	3	0	1	1	0	––	––	––	––	––
1973–74	New York Golden Blades/Jersey Knights	WHA	7	1	0	1	0	––	––	––	––	––
1976–77	San Diego Mariners	WHA	1	0	0	0	0	––	––	––	––	––
WHA totals			60	1	12	13	23	—	—	—	—	—

== Awards ==
Award	Year
All-WCHA First Team	1971–72
AHCA West All-American	1971–72
