= Critch =

Critch is a surname. Notable people with the surname include:

- Darrell Critch, Canadian Anglican bishop in Madagascar
- Glenn Critch (born 1954), Canadian ice hockey player
- Jay Critch (born 1998), American rapper, singer and songwriter
- Mark Critch (born 1974), Canadian comedian, actor, and writer
