= Jaquith =

Jaquith may refer to:

== People ==
- Clarence Jaquith (1896–1993), American track and field athlete
- Cynthia Jaquith, American political candidate; see 2017 Miami mayoral election
- David H. Jaquith, American political candidate; see 1962 New York state election
- Grant C. Jaquith, American judge
- Mark Jaquith, lead developer of WordPress

== Other ==
- Abraham Jaquith House, an historic house in Billerica, Massachusetts
- Dr. Jaquith, a character in Now, Voyager
- Jaquith Pond, a lake in Maine

== See also ==
- Jacquith (disambiguation)
