= Craig Reichmuth =

Canadian ice hockey player

- Born: September 22, 1947 Russell, Manitoba, Canada
- Died: August 14, 2012 (aged 64) Trail, British Columbia, Canada
- Height: 5 ft 11 in (180 cm)
- Weight: 185 lb (84 kg; 13 st 3 lb)
- Position: Left wing
- Shot: Left
- Played for: New York Raiders; San Diego Mariners; Michigan Stags
- Playing career: 1968–1979

Craig Richard Reichmuth (September 22, 1947 – August 14, 2012) was a professional ice hockey player who played 189 games in the World Hockey Association. He played with the New York Raiders, San Diego Mariners, and Michigan Stags. In his final year of junior competition at Min Flon with a line of him, Bobby Clarke, and Lew Morrison, Reichmuth notably recorded 333 penalty minutes.

== Career statistics ==
=== Regular season and playoffs ===
			Regular season					Playoffs
Season	Team	League	GP	G	A	Pts	PIM	GP	G	A	Pts	PIM
1967–68	Flin Flon Bombers	WCJHL	60	18	31	49	333	—	—	—	—	—
1968–69	Fort Worth Wings	CHL	54	2	7	9	82	—	—	—	—	—
1969–70	Cleveland Barons	AHL	69	8	15	23	94	—	—	—	—	—
1969–70	Fort Worth Wings	CHL	—	—	—	—	—	3	0	2	2	9
1970–71	San Diego Gulls	WHL	17	3	2	5	31	—	—	—	—	—
1970–71	Fort Worth Wings	CHL	58	14	18	32	140	4	0	1	1	13
1971–72	Tidewater Wings	AHL	10	0	0	0	10	—	—	—	—	—
1971–72	Fort Worth Wings	CHL	58	9	17	26	143	7	0	0	0	6
1972–73	New York Raiders	WHA	73	13	14	27	127	—	—	—	—	—
1973–74	Syracuse Blazers	NAHL	3	2	2	4	9	—	—	—	—	—
1973–74	New York Golden Blades/Jersey Knights	WHA	72	10	8	18	114	—	—	—	—	—
1974–75	Syracuse Blazers	NAHL	20	9	11	20	26	7	1	3	4	18
1974–75	San Diego Mariners	WHA	28	2	1	3	58	—	—	—	—	—
1974–75	Michigan Stags/Baltimore Blades	WHA	16	0	2	2	23	—	—	—	—	—
1975–76	Syracuse Blazers	NAHL	56	13	30	43	145	—	—	—	—	—
1975–76	Erie Blades	NAHL	12	8	3	11	24	5	3	4	7	15
1976–77	Erie Blades	NAHL	39	4	18	22	69	—	—	—	—	—
1976–77	Johnstown Jets	NAHL	34	5	8	13	52	3	0	0	0	0
1977–78	Trail Smoke Eaters	WIHL	––	13	21	34	98	—	—	—	—	—
1978–79	Trail Smoke Eaters	WIHL	Statistics Unavailable
WHA totals			189	25	25	50	322	—	—	—	—	—
