= Brian Bradley (ice hockey, born 1944) =

Canadian ice hockey player and coach (born 1944)

- Born: December 14, 1944 (age 81) Sudbury, Ontario, Canada
- Height: 5 ft 10 in (178 cm)
- Weight: 185 lb (84 kg; 13 st 3 lb)
- Position: Left wing
- Shot: Left
- Played for: New York Raiders; New York Golden Blades; Jersey Knights; San Diego Mariners
- Playing career: 1965–1976

Brian James Bradley (born December 14, 1944) is a Canadian former professional ice hockey player and coach. He played three seasons in the World Hockey Association from 1972 to 1975, with the New York Raiders, New York Golden Blades, Jersey Knights, and San Diego Mariners.

== Career ==
Bradley played junior hockey for the Toronto Marlboros from 1960 until 1963, switching to the Niagara Falls Flyers for the 1963–64 and 1964–65 seasons in the Ontario Hockey Association.

Bradley turned professional in 1965 with the Oklahoma City Blazers. He played with the Blazers, Dallas Black Hawks and the Quebec Aces until the formation of the World Hockey Association. Bradley joined the New York Raiders in 1972 and played two seasons with the franchise, becoming the New York Golden Blades in the second season. Bradley played one final season in the WHA with the San Diego Mariners before one final professional season with the Roanoke Valley Rebels of the Southern Hockey League.

== Career statistics ==
=== Regular season and playoffs ===
			Regular season					Playoffs
Season	Team	League	GP	G	A	Pts	PIM	GP	G	A	Pts	PIM
1960–61	Toronto Marlboros	OHA	1	1	0	1	0	—	—	—	—	—
1960–61	Weston Dukes	MJBHL	Statistics Unavailable
1961–62	Toronto Marlboros	OHA	9	0	3	3	0	—	—	—	—	—
1961–62	Brampton Seven–Ups	OHA	28	4	7	11	0	—	—	—	—	—
1962–63	Brampton Seven–Ups	OHA	40	21	24	45	0	—	—	—	—	—
1963–64	Niagara Falls Flyers	OHA	56	18	17	35	0	—	—	—	—	—
1964–65	Niagara Falls Flyers	OHA	54	26	29	55	0	—	—	—	—	—
1965–66	Oklahoma City Blazers	CPHL	69	7	13	20	28	9	6	2	8	0
1966–67	Oklahoma City Blazers	CPHL	67	21	24	45	28	11	2	1	3	8
1967–68	Oklahoma City Blazers	CPHL	57	14	20	34	15	7	1	2	3	0
1968–69	Dallas Black Hawks	CHL	50	16	15	31	27	11	3	5	8	2
1968–69	Quebec Aces	AHL	22	1	1	2	2	—	—	—	—	—
1969–70	Dallas Black Hawks	CHL	69	13	28	41	22	—	—	—	—	—
1970–71	Oklahoma City Blazers	CHL	72	22	28	50	30	5	1	0	1	4
1971–72	Oklahoma City Blazers	CHL	69	18	21	39	30	6	1	1	2	4
1972–73	New York Raiders	WHA	78	22	33	55	20	—	—	—	—	—
1973–74	New York Golden Blades/Jersey Knights	WHA	78	15	23	38	12	—	—	—	—	—
1974–75	Syracuse Blazers	NAHL	33	12	20	32	11	—	—	—	—	—
1974–75	San Diego Mariners	WHA	34	4	5	9	6	6	0	1	1	2
1975–76	Roanoke Valley Rebels	SHL	70	15	32	47	12	6	0	0	0	4
WHA totals			190	41	61	102	38	6	0	1	1	2
