= Brian Perry (ice hockey) =

- Born: April 6, 1944 Aldershot, England, United Kingdom
- Died: January 16, 2023 (aged 78) Kirkland Lake, Ontario, Canada
- Height: 5 ft 11 in (180 cm)
- Weight: 176 lb (80 kg; 12 st 8 lb)
- Position: Left wing
- Shot: Left
- Played for: Oakland Seals; Buffalo Sabres; New York Raiders; New York Golden Blades; Jersey Knights; San Diego Mariners
- Playing career: 1964–1975

Brian Thomas Perry (April 6, 1944 – January 16, 2023) was a Canadian professional ice hockey left wing. He played in the National Hockey League with the Oakland Seals and Buffalo Sabres, as well as in the World Hockey Association with the New York Raiders, New York Golden Blades, Jersey Knights, and San Diego Mariners. Perry was born in Aldershot, England, but grew up in Kirkland Lake, Ontario.

In his NHL career, Perry played in 96 games, scoring 16 goals and adding 29 assists. In the WHA, he played in 145 games, scoring 33 goals and adding 31 assists. The highlight of Brian's NHL career came on 19 February 1969. Playing for the Oakland Seals, Brian scored a hat trick in a 5–2 victory over the Chicago Blackhawks in Oakland.

Perry died on January 16, 2023, at the age of 78.

== Career statistics ==
=== Regular season and playoffs ===
			Regular season					Playoffs
Season	Team	League	GP	G	A	Pts	PIM	GP	G	A	Pts	PIM
1963–64	Owen Sound Greys	CJBHL	40	44	41	85	—	—	—	—	—	—
1964–65	New York Rovers	EHL	8	1	0	1	4	—	—	—	—	—
1964–65	New Glasgow Rangers	NSSHL	—	12	12	24	12	—	—	—	—	—
1965–66	New Haven Blades	EHL	71	39	49	88	28	3	0	2	2	0
1965–66	Providence Reds	AHL	8	3	1	4	2	—	—	—	—	—
1966–67	Providence Reds	AHL	62	23	30	53	10	—	—	—	—	—
1967–68	Providence Reds	AHL	71	31	38	69	36	8	0	9	9	8
1968–69	Oakland Seals	NHL	61	10	21	31	10	6	1	1	2	4
1969–70	Oakland Seals	NHL	34	6	8	14	14	2	0	0	0	0
1969–70	Providence Reds	AHL	24	10	17	27	4	—	—	—	—	—
1970–71	Buffalo Sabres	NHL	1	0	0	0	0	—	—	—	—	—
1970–71	Seattle Totems	WHL	47	12	11	23	24	—	—	—	—	—
1971–72	Providence Reds	AHL	76	24	25	49	52	5	1	4	5	2
1972–73	New York Islanders	NHL	74	13	20	33	30	—	—	—	—	—
1973–74	New York Golden Blades/Jersey Knights	WHA	71	20	11	31	19	—	—	—	—	—
1974–75	Syracuse Blazers	NAHL	73	32	56	88	102	—	—	—	—	—
1974–75	San Diego Mariners	WHA	—	—	—	—	—	6	1	2	3	6
WHA totals			145	33	31	64	49	6	1	2	3	6
NHL totals			96	16	29	45	24	8	1	1	2	4

== See also ==
- List of National Hockey League players from the United Kingdom
