= Dean Boylan =

American ice hockey player

- Born: January 28, 1951 (age 74) Boston, Massachusetts, U.S.
- Height: 6 ft 0 in (183 cm)
- Weight: 190 lb (86 kg; 13 st 8 lb)
- Position: Defense
- Shot: Left
- Played for: WHA; New York Golden Blades; Jersey Knights; San Diego Mariners; AHL; Richmond Robins; NAHL; Syracuse Blazers; Philadelphia Firebirds
- NHL draft: Undrafted
- Playing career: 1973–1977

Dean Boylan (born January 28, 1951) is an American former professional ice hockey defenseman.

During the 1973–74 and 1974–75 seasons, Boylan played 64 games in the World Hockey Association with the New York Golden Blades, Jersey Knights, and San Diego Mariners.

== Career statistics ==
			Regular season					Playoffs
Season	Team	League	GP	G	A	Pts	PIM	GP	G	A	Pts	PIM
1970–71	Yale University	NCAA	19	0	6	6	38	—	—	—	—	—
1971–72	Yale University	NCAA	23	2	13	15	26	—	—	—	—	—
1972–73	Yale University	NCAA	22	2	11	13	30	—	—	—	—	—
1973–74	New York Golden Blades/Jersey Knights	WHA	61	1	5	6	112	—	—	—	—	—
1974–75	San Diego Mariners	WHA	3	0	0	0	10	—	—	—	—	—
1974–75	Syracuse Blazers	NAHL-Sr.	66	2	21	23	219	7	0	3	3	6
1975–76	Philadelphia Firebirds	NAHL-Sr.	66	6	16	22	184	16	1	3	4	72
1976–77	Philadelphia Firebirds	NAHL-Sr.	72	2	16	18	199	4	0	1	1	2
WHA totals			64	1	5	6	122	—	—	—	—	—
NAHL-Sr. totals			204	10	53	63	602	27	1	7	8	80
