= Glen Irwin =

Canadian ice hockey player

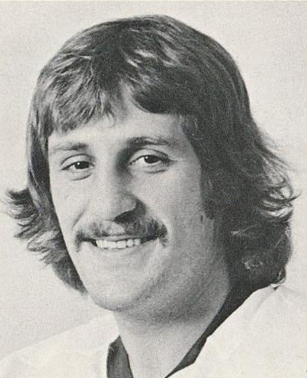
- Born: March 1, 1951 (age 74) Edmonton, Alberta, Canada
- Height: 5 ft 11 in (180 cm)
- Weight: 195 lb (88 kg; 13 st 13 lb)
- Position: Defence
- Shot: Right
- Played for: Houston Aeros; Indianapolis Racers
- NHL draft: 36th overall, 1971; Philadelphia Flyers
- Playing career: 1971–1980

Glen Irwin (born March 1, 1951) is a Canadian former professional ice hockey player. He played in 233 WHA games with the Houston Aeros and Indianapolis Racers over parts of five seasons.

== Career statistics ==
			Regular season					Playoffs
Season	Team	League	GP	G	A	Pts	PIM	GP	G	A	Pts	PIM
1969–70	St. Catharines Black Hawks	OHA-Jr.	2	0	1	1	9	—	—	—	—	—
1969–70	Estevan Bruins	WCHL	—	—	—	—	—	—	—	—	—	—
1970–71	Estevan Bruins	WCHL	64	8	26	34	261	—	—	—	—	—
1971–72	Richmond Robins	AHL	18	0	2	2	16	—	—	—	—	—
1971–72	Flint Generals	IHL	17	1	2	3	28	4	0	1	1	7
1971–72	Seattle Totems	WHL-Sr.	7	0	0	0	10	—	—	—	—	—
1971–72	San Diego Gulls	WHL-Sr.	9	0	1	1	22	—	—	—	—	—
1972–73	Richmond Robins	AHL	15	0	0	0	36	—	—	—	—	—
1973–74	Fort Worth Wings	CHL	68	0	13	13	135	5	0	2	2	13
1974–75	Houston Aeros	WHA	70	2	11	13	153	13	0	2	2	8
1975–76	Houston Aeros	WHA	72	3	8	11	116	5	0	0	0	9
1976–77	Houston Aeros	WHA	44	2	4	6	168	—	—	—	—	—
1976–77	Oklahoma City Blazers	CHL	24	1	2	3	70	—	—	—	—	—
1977–78	Binghamton Dusters	AHL	51	0	12	12	191	—	—	—	—	—
1977–78	Indianapolis Racers	WHA	20	0	0	0	72	—	—	—	—	—
1977–78	Houston Aeros	WHA	3	0	0	0	0	—	—	—	—	—
1978–79	San Diego Hawks	PHL	42	4	24	28	44	—	—	—	—	—
1978–79	Indianapolis Racers	WHA	24	0	1	1	124	—	—	—	—	—
1979–80	Houston Apollos	CHL	2	0	0	0	14	—	—	—	—	—
WHA totals			233	7	24	31	633	18	0	2	2	17
