= Cherry Hill Arena =

Arena in New Jersey, United States

Coordinates: 39.8904°N 75.0167°W

The Cherry Hill Arena was an indoor arena located in Cherry Hill, New Jersey, built in 1959. It was originally known as the Ice House and renamed the Delaware Valley Gardens before assuming its most familiar name. The arena, which seated 4,416, was the home of the short-lived Jersey Larks of the Eastern Hockey League in 1960-61 and hosted occasional home games of the NBA Philadelphia Warriors. In 1964 EHL hockey returned to the arena in the form of the Jersey Devils, who would be the arena's longest-lasting tenants, surviving until the EHL folded in 1973. Early in the 1973–1974 hockey season, the New York Golden Blades of the World Hockey Association moved to the arena and played there as the Jersey Knights for the rest of the season. Sports Illustrated later described Cherry Hill Arena as "perhaps the worst facility" used by any WHA team, noting that it lacked showers in the dressing room for visiting teams, who had to dress at a Holiday Inn two miles away, and that the arena's ice surface was not even level, giving the home team a distinct home advantage as the visitors would have to skate uphill to the opponent's goal.

By 1978 the arena had been renamed The Centrum. The Jersey Aces of the Northeastern Hockey League began the 1978-79 season as tenants at the Centrum, but moved to Hampton, Virginia, after a handful of home games.

The Cherry Hill Arena was demolished in the 1980s and replaced by a shopping center, the main tenant of which was – at different times – a Kmart and four grocery stores; a Super G, Stop & Shop, ShopRite, and lastly a Hung Vuong Food Market. Another shopping center, called the Centrum Shops, uses the arena's final name but is located across Brace Road from the arena site. The Arena was owned by David Baird IV, CEO of Haddonfield Lumber.
