= Lee Inglis =

Canadian ice hockey player

- Born: August 31, 1947 (age 78) Latchford, Ontario, Canada
- Height: 6 ft 0 in (183 cm)
- Weight: 100 lb (45 kg; 7 st 2 lb)
- Position: Left wing
- Shot: Left
- Played for: WHA; New York Golden Blades; Jersey Knights; San Diego Mariners; IHL; Dayton Gems; Toledo Blades; EHL/NAHL; Syracuse Blazers; CHL; Tucson Mavericks
- NHL draft: Undrafted
- Playing career: 1973–1977

Lee Inglis (born August 31, 1947) is a Canadian former professional ice hockey player.

During the 1973–74 and 1974–75 seasons, Inglis played 10 games in the World Hockey Association with the New York Golden Blades/Jersey Knights, and San Diego Mariners.

== Career statistics ==
=== Regular season and playoffs ===
			Regular season					Playoffs
Season	Team	League	GP	G	A	Pts	PIM	GP	G	A	Pts	PIM
1967–68	Kitchener Rangers	OHA	54	32	28	60	62	—	—	—	—	—
1968–69	Dayton-Toledo	IHL	12	2	2	4	4	—	—	—	—	—
1968–69	Syracuse Blazers	EHL	51	22	18	40	22	—	—	—	—	—
1969–70	Syracuse Blazers	EHL	71	20	39	59	22	4	2	1	3	2
1970–71	Holland	Intl	Statistics Unavailable
1971–72	Syracuse Blazers	EHL	63	44	53	97	44	17	8	14	22	6
1972–73	Holland	Intl	12	19	16	35	0	—	—	—	—	—
1973–74	New York Golden Blades/Jersey Knights	WHA	5	0	0	0	0	—	—	—	—	—
1973–74	Syracuse Blazers	NAHL	55	30	40	70	32	—	—	—	—	—
1974–75	San Diego Mariners	WHA	5	0	2	2	0	—	—	—	—	—
1974–75	Syracuse Blazers	NAHL	63	21	32	53	22	7	2	3	5	0
1975–76	Tucson Mavericks	CHL	12	3	3	6	0	—	—	—	—	—
WHA totals			10	0	2	2	0	—	—	—	—	—
