= Normand Cournoyer =

Canadian ice hockey player

- Born: March 17, 1951 (age 75) Drummondville, Quebec, Canada
- Height: 5 ft 10 in (178 cm)
- Weight: 170 lb (77 kg; 12 st 2 lb)
- Position: Centre
- Shot: Left
- Played for: WHA; Cleveland Crusaders; San Diego Mariners
- NHL draft: Undrafted
- Playing career: 1971–1978

Normand Cournoyer (born March 17, 1951) is a Canadian former professional ice hockey player.

During the 1973–74 season, Cournoyer played 13 games with the Cleveland Crusaders, and during the 1976–77 season he played 19 games with the San Diego Mariners, both of the World Hockey Association.

== Career statistics ==
=== Regular season and playoffs ===
			Regular season					Playoffs
Season	Team	League	GP	G	A	Pts	PIM	GP	G	A	Pts	PIM
1969–70	Verdun Maple Leafs	QMJHL	53	8	22	30	60	11	4	3	7	10
1970–71	Verdun Maple Leafs	QMJHL	61	28	51	79	78	5	1	3	4	2
1971–72	Columbus Golden Seals	IHL	3	0	0	0	5	––	––	––	––	––
1972–73	Syracuse Blazers	EHL	76	47	71	118	87	14	11	10	21	42
1973–74	Jacksonville Barons	AHL	34	7	12	19	35	––	––	––	––	––
1973–74	Cleveland Crusaders	WHA	13	3	5	8	6	––	––	––	––	––
1973–74	Macon Whoopees	SHL	25	11	15	26	65	––	––	––	––	––
1974–75	Denver Spurs	CHL	53	6	10	16	59	2	0	1	1	2
1975–76	Columbus Owls	IHL	11	3	4	7	7	––	––	––	––	––
1975–76	Muskegon Mohawks	IHL	8	2	2	4	0	––	––	––	––	––
1975–76	Tucson Mavericks	CHL	55	17	25	42	46	––	––	––	––	––
1976–77	Charlotte Checkers	SHL	40	12	32	44	14	––	––	––	––	––
1976–77	San Diego Mariners	WHA	19	1	2	3	8	––	––	––	––	––
1977–78	San Francisco Shamrocks	PHL	23	9	20	29	25	––	––	––	––	––
WHA totals			32	4	7	11	14	—	—	—	—	—
