= Joe Junkin =

Canadian ice hockey player

- Born: September 8, 1946; Lindsay, Ontario, Canada
- Died: January 11, 2014 (aged 67); Harrisburg, Pennsylvania, USA
- Height: 5 ft 11 in (180 cm)
- Weight: 180 lb (82 kg; 12 st 12 lb)
- Position: Goaltender
- Caught: Left
- Played for: Boston Bruins; New York Golden Blades/Jersey Knights; San Diego Mariners
- Playing career: 1968–1976

Joseph Brian Junkin (September 8, 1946 – January 11, 2014) was a Canadian professional ice hockey goaltender who played in one National Hockey League game for the Boston Bruins during the 1968–69 season, and 68 games in the World Hockey Association with the New York Golden Blades/Jersey Knights and San Diego Mariners between 1973 and 1975. His one game was on December 14, 1968, when he played 9 minutes against the Chicago Black Hawks. The rest of his career, which lasted from 1968 to 1975, was spent in various minor leagues. He died of cancer on January 11, 2014.

== Career statistics ==
=== Regular season and playoffs ===
| | | | Regular season | | | | | | | | | Playoffs |
| Season | Team | League | GP | W | L | T | MIN | GA | SO | GAA | SV% | GP | W | L | MIN | GA | SO | GAA | SV% |
|---|---|---|---|---|---|---|---|---|---|---|---|---|---|---|---|---|---|---|---|
| 1966–67 | Bobcaygeon Bobcats | OHA-B | — | — | — | — | — | — | — | — | — | — | — | — | — | — | — | — | — |
| 1967–68 | Belleville Mohawks | OHA Sr | 24 | — | — | — | 1410 | 100 | 0 | 4.26 | — | — | — | — | — | — | — | — | — |
| 1968–69 | Boston Bruins | NHL | 1 | 0 | 0 | 0 | 9 | 0 | 0 | 0.00 | 1.000 | — | — | — | — | — | — | — | — |
| 1968–69 | Oklahoma City Blazers | CHL | 27 | — | — | — | 1420 | 78 | 0 | 3.30 | — | 5 | 0 | 4 | 230 | 19 | 0 | 4.96 | — |
| 1969–70 | Oklahoma City Blazers | CHL | 9 | 4 | 4 | 0 | 500 | 38 | 1 | 4.56 | — | — | — | — | — | — | — | — | — |
| 1969–70 | Hershey Bears | AHL | 17 | — | — | — | 969 | 63 | 0 | 3.90 | — | — | — | — | — | — | — | — | — |
| 1971–72 | Fenelon Falls Flyers | UOVHL | — | — | — | — | — | — | — | — | — | — | — | — | — | — | — | — | — |
| 1972–73 | Long Island Ducks | EHL | 2 | — | — | — | 80 | 12 | 0 | 9.00 | — | — | — | — | — | — | — | — | — |
| 1972–73 | Syracuse Blazers | EHL | 34 | — | — | — | 2071 | 90 | 5 | 2.61 | — | 7 | 3 | 3 | 399 | 17 | 1 | 2.57 | — |
| 1973–74 | New York Golden Blades/Jersey Knights | WHA | 53 | 21 | 25 | 4 | 3122 | 197 | 1 | 3.79 | .888 | — | — | — | — | — | — | — | — |
| 1974–75 | San Diego Mariners | WHA | 16 | 6 | 7 | 0 | 839 | 46 | 1 | 3.29 | .889 | — | — | — | — | — | — | — | — |
| 1974–75 | Syracuse Blazers | NAHL | 20 | 11 | 8 | 0 | 1183 | 72 | 0 | 3.65 | — | 6 | 3 | 3 | 360 | 21 | 1 | 3.50 | — |
| 1975–76 | Tidewater Sharks | SHL | 7 | 1 | 5 | 1 | 390 | 30 | 0 | 4.62 | .887 | — | — | — | — | — | — | — | — |
| 1975–76 | Roanoke Valley Rebels | SHL | 29 | 12 | 13 | 3 | 1686 | 97 | 1 | 3.45 | .895 | — | — | — | — | — | — | — | — |
| WHA totals | | | 68 | 27 | 32 | 4 | 3860 | 243 | 2 | 3.68 | .888 | — | — | — | — | — | — | — | — |
| NHL totals | | | 1 | 0 | 0 | 0 | 9 | 0 | 0 | 0.00 | 1.00 | — | — | — | — | — | — | — | — |

== See also ==
- List of players who played only one game in the NHL
