= Norm Ferguson (ice hockey) =

Canadian ice hockey player and coach

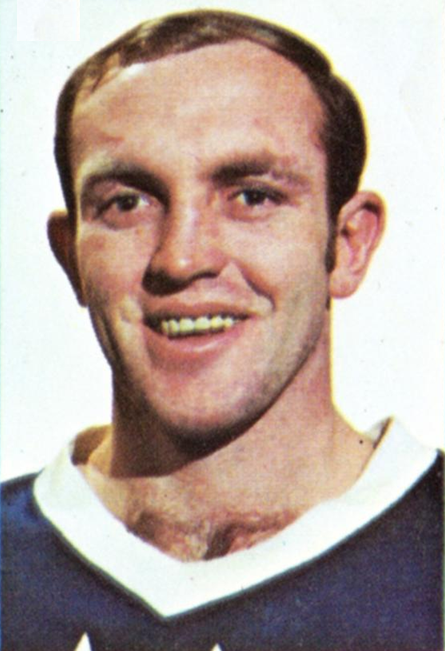
- Born: October 16, 1945 (age 80) Sydney, Nova Scotia, Canada
- Height: 5 ft 8 in (173 cm)
- Weight: 160 lb (73 kg; 11 st 6 lb)
- Position: Right wing
- Shot: Right
- Played for: Cleveland Barons; Oakland Seals; California Golden Seals; New York Raiders; New York Golden Blades; Jersey Knights; San Diego Mariners; Edmonton Oilers
- Playing career: 1968–1978

Norman Gerard Ferguson (born October 16, 1945) is a Canadian former ice hockey player and coach. Ferguson was a forward who played right wing. He is the father of former NHL player Craig Ferguson. In 1982, Ferguson was inducted into the Nova Scotia Sports Hall of Fame.

== Playing career ==
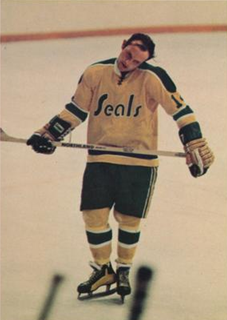
Ferguson with the California Golden Seals in 1971

Ferguson played junior ice hockey with the Montreal Junior Canadiens for the 1964–65 and 1965–66 seasons. Ferguson moved to the Montreal Canadiens farm team, the Houston Apollos in the Central Professional Hockey League for the 1966–67 season. Ferguson then played for the Cleveland Barons in the American Hockey League in the 1967–68 season.

In his rookie season in the National Hockey League with the Oakland Seals, Ferguson set the Seals single-season record for goals; he scored 34 during the 1968–69 season. This was a new record for a rookie. After the season, Ferguson finished second to Danny Grant in the balloting for the Calder Memorial Trophy.

The New York Islanders selected Ferguson from the Seals in the 1972 NHL Expansion Draft, but Ferguson had signed a contract to play with the New York Raiders in the World Hockey Association for the 1972–73 season. Ferguson was the team captain of the 1974–75 San Diego Mariners. Ferguson finished his playing career with the Edmonton Oilers in 1977–78.

== Coaching career ==
Ferguson took over as head coach of the WHL's Edmonton Oil Kings part way through the 1978-79 season. Ferguson later served as assistant coach for his hometown team, the Cape Breton Oilers of the American Hockey League for seven seasons from 1989 to 1996. Ferguson was assistant coach to George Burnett when the Oilers won the Calder Cup in the 1992–93 AHL season.

== Career statistics ==
=== Regular season and playoffs ===
			Regular season					Playoffs
Season	Team	League	GP	G	A	Pts	PIM	GP	G	A	Pts	PIM
1963–64	Lachine Maroons	QJHL	42	32	60	92	12	—	—	—	—	—
1964–65	Montreal Junior Canadiens	OHA	51	17	16	33	0	—	—	—	—	—
1965–66	Montreal Junior Canadiens	OHA	43	16	29	45	27	—	—	—	—	—
1966–67	Houston Apollos	CPHL	55	8	6	14	20	1	0	0	0	0
1967–68	Cleveland Barons	AHL	72	42	33	75	27	—	—	—	—	—
1968–69	Oakland Seals	NHL	76	34	20	54	31	7	1	4	5	7
1969–70	Oakland Seals	NHL	72	11	9	20	19	3	0	0	0	0
1970–71	California Golden Seals	NHL	54	14	17	31	9	—	—	—	—	—
1971–72	California Golden Seals	NHL	74	14	20	34	13	—	—	—	—	—
1972–73	New York Raiders	WHA	56	28	40	68	8	—	—	—	—	—
1973–74	New York Golden Blades/Jersey Knights	WHA	75	15	21	36	12	—	—	—	—	—
1974–75	San Diego Mariners	WHA	78	36	33	69	6	10	6	5	11	0
1975–76	San Diego Mariners	WHA	79	37	37	74	12	4	2	0	2	9
1976–77	San Diego Mariners	WHA	77	39	32	71	5	7	2	4	6	0
1977–78	Edmonton Oilers	WHA	71	26	21	47	2	5	0	0	0	0
WHA totals			436	181	184	365	45	26	10	9	19	9
NHL totals			279	73	66	139	72	10	1	4	5	7

== Coaching record ==
Team	Year	League	Regular Season							Post Season
Team	Year	League	G	W	L	T	OTL	Pts	Finish	Result
Edmonton Oil Kings	1978–79	WHL	72	17	43	12	0	46	3rd in East	Lost in round-robin
TOTALS		WHL	72	17	43	12	0	46	—	—
