= Kevin Morrison =

Canadian ice hockey player

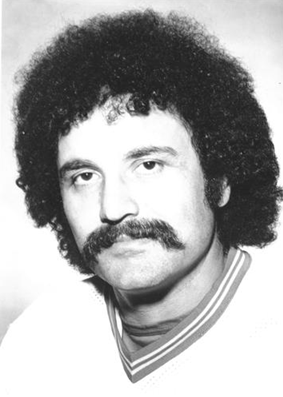
- Born: October 28, 1949 (age 76) Sydney, Nova Scotia, Canada
- Height: 5 ft 11 in (180 cm)
- Weight: 202 lb (92 kg; 14 st 6 lb)
- Position: Defence
- Shot: Left
- Played for: New York Golden Blades; Jersey Knights; San Diego Mariners; Indianapolis Racers; Quebec Nordiques; Colorado Rockies
- NHL draft: 35th overall, 1969; New York Rangers
- Playing career: 1969–1986

Kevin Gregory Joseph Morrison (born October 28, 1949) is a Canadian former professional ice hockey player who played 418 games in the World Hockey Association (WHA) and 41 games in the National Hockey League (NHL) between 1973 and 1980, scoring a total of 97 goals and 235 assists.

== Career ==
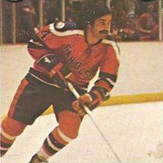
Morrison with the San Diego Mariners, c. 1975.

Morrison was scouted while playing high school hockey for Sydney Academy and junior hockey for Saint-Jérôme Alouettes. He was drafted in the third round of the 1969 NHL entry draft by the New York Rangers. After two seasons in the Eastern Hockey League and Central Hockey League, he advanced to the American Hockey League (AHL), playing for the Rochester Americans and Tidewater Wings, scoring two goals for the former. Morrison spent the following season with the New Haven Nighthawks of the AHL, tallying 7 goals and 28 assists.

Morrison was mostly known as an enforcer who was involved in many memorable hockey fights. During his season with the Nighthawks, he tangled with Rochester's J. Bob "Battleship" Kelly - both combatants fought furiously until exhausted, had a brief respite, then continued until neither man could punch anymore.

Morrison spent the next five seasons, from 1973 to 1978, exclusively in the World Hockey Association. He scored better than 20 goals in his first three seasons in the league and was selected to the one WHA All-Star game. He was involved in another memorable fight during the 1978–79 season against Steve Durbano of the Birmingham Bulls. In this skirmish, even after Morrison was assessed a penalty and was standing in the penalty box, Durbano continued to go after him. Durbano broke free of the linesman holding him back and took several wild swings at Morrison, who himself broke free of the other linesman and decked his opponent with a clean right that sent Durbano crumpling to the ice.

Splitting 1978-79 between the AHL and WHA, Morrison recorded the only assist on Wayne Gretzky's first professional goal on October 20, 1978, against Edmonton Oilers goalie Dave Dryden. Morrison spent half his final year in pro hockey playing in the NHL for the Colorado Rockies. In 41 NHL games, he scored 4 goals and added 11 assists.

== Personal life ==
Morrison retired from senior hockey in 1986 and, as of 2016, lives in his hometown of Sydney, Nova Scotia.

== Career statistics ==
=== Regular season and playoffs ===
| | | | Regular season | | | | | Playoffs |
| Season | Team | League | GP | G | A | Pts | PIM | GP | G | A | Pts | PIM |
|---|---|---|---|---|---|---|---|---|---|---|---|---|
| 1966–67 | Drummondville Rangers | QJAHL | 3 | 0 | 0 | 0 | 4 | — | — | — | — | — |
| 1967–68 | Drummondville Rangers | QJAHL | 10 | 1 | 1 | 2 | 21 | — | — | — | — | — |
| 1967–68 | Drummondville Rangers | M-Cup | — | — | — | — | — | 4 | 0 | 1 | 1 | 6 |
| 1968–69 | Saint-Jérôme Alouettes | QJHL | — | — | — | — | — | — | — | — | — | — |
| 1969–70 | New Haven Blades | EHL | 48 | 24 | 18 | 42 | 136 | 11 | 4 | 7 | 11 | 53 |
| 1969–70 | Omaha Knights | CHL | — | — | — | — | — | 5 | 2 | 0 | 2 | 20 |
| 1970–71 | New Haven Blades | EHL | 64 | 11 | 44 | 55 | 348 | 14 | 3 | 6 | 9 | 67 |
| 1970–71 | Fort Worth Wings | CHL | 3 | 0 | 0 | 0 | 0 | — | — | — | — | — |
| 1971–72 | Tidewater Wings | AHL | 11 | 0 | 2 | 2 | 18 | — | — | — | — | — |
| 1971–72 | Fort Worth Wings | CHL | 26 | 2 | 1 | 3 | 56 | — | — | — | — | — |
| 1971–72 | Rochester Americans | AHL | 29 | 2 | 0 | 2 | 49 | — | — | — | — | — |
| 1972–73 | New Haven Nighthawks | AHL | 74 | 7 | 28 | 35 | 154 | — | — | — | — | — |
| 1973–74 | New York Golden Blades/Jersey Knights | WHA | 78 | 24 | 43 | 67 | 132 | — | — | — | — | — |
| 1974–75 | San Diego Mariners | WHA | 78 | 20 | 61 | 81 | 143 | 10 | 0 | 7 | 7 | 2 |
| 1975–76 | San Diego Mariners | WHA | 80 | 22 | 43 | 65 | 56 | 11 | 1 | 5 | 6 | 12 |
| 1976–77 | San Diego Mariners | WHA | 75 | 8 | 30 | 38 | 68 | 7 | 1 | 3 | 4 | 8 |
| 1977–78 | Indianapolis Racers | WHA | 75 | 17 | 40 | 57 | 49 | — | — | — | — | — |
| 1978–79 | Indianapolis Racers | WHA | 5 | 0 | 2 | 2 | 0 | — | — | — | — | — |
| 1978–79 | Quebec Nordiques | WHA | 27 | 2 | 5 | 7 | 14 | — | — | — | — | — |
| 1978–79 | Philadelphia Firebirds | AHL | 23 | 1 | 13 | 14 | 15 | — | — | — | — | — |
| 1979–80 | Colorado Rockies | NHL | 41 | 4 | 11 | 15 | 23 | — | — | — | — | — |
| 1979–80 | Fort Worth Texans | CHL | 33 | 5 | 16 | 21 | 45 | — | — | — | — | — |
| 1981–82 | Stephenville Jets | NFLD-Sr | — | — | — | — | — | — | — | — | — | — |
| 1982–83 | Stephenville Jets | NFLD-Sr | — | — | — | — | — | — | — | — | — | — |
| 1983–84 | Stephenville Jets | NFLD-Sr | — | — | — | — | — | — | — | — | — | — |
| 1984–85 | Stephenville Jets | NFLD-Sr | — | — | — | — | — | — | — | — | — | — |
| 1985–86 | Stephenville Jets | NFLD-Sr | 39 | 18 | 25 | 43 | 110 | — | — | — | — | — |
| WHA totals | | | 418 | 93 | 224 | 317 | 462 | 28 | 2 | 15 | 17 | 22 |
| NHL totals | | | 41 | 4 | 11 | 15 | 23 | — | — | — | — | — |
