= Gary Jacquith =

American ice hockey player

- Born: January 28, 1948 (age 78) Lynn, Massachusetts, USA
- Height: 6 ft 0 in (183 cm)
- Weight: 190 lb (86 kg; 13 st 8 lb)
- Position: Defense
- Shot: Right
- Played for: WHA; San Diego Mariners; AHL; Boston Braves; Rochester Americans; NAHL; Binghamton Dusters
- NHL draft: Undrafted
- Playing career: 1973–1977

Gary Alan Jacquith (born May 30, 1948) is an American former professional ice hockey defenseman.

During the 1975–76 season, Jacquith played two games in the World Hockey Association with the San Diego Mariners.

== Career statistics ==
			Regular season					Playoffs
Season	Team	League	GP	G	A	Pts	PIM	GP	G	A	Pts	PIM
1966–67	University of New Hampshire	NCAA	—	—	—	—	—	—	—	—	—	—
1967–68	University of New Hampshire	NCAA	10	0	1	1	9	—	—	—	—	—
1968–69	University of New Hampshire	NCAA	20	1	2	3	12	—	—	—	—	—
1969–70	University of New Hampshire	NCAA	29	5	12	17	14	—	—	—	—	—
1973–74	Boston Braves	AHL	67	2	11	13	140	—	—	—	—	—
1974–75	Broome Dusters	NAHL-Sr.	61	8	22	30	30	13	0	3	3	31
1975–76	Broome Dusters	NAHL-Sr.	58	2	19	21	144	—	—	—	—	—
1975–76	San Diego Mariners	WHA	2	0	0	0	0	—	—	—	—	—
1976–77	Broome Dusters	NAHL-Sr.	72	11	14	25	128	8	1	1	2	0
1976–77	Rochester Americans	AHL	1	0	0	0	0	10	1	1	2	2
WHA totals			2	0	0	0	0	—	—	—	—	—
AHL totals			68	2	11	13	140	10	1	1	2	2
NAHL-Sr. totals			191	21	55	76	302	21	1	4	5	31
