= Ted Scharf =

Canadian ice hockey player

- Born: October 3, 1951 (age 74) Sudbury, Ontario, Canada
- Height: 5 ft 11 in (180 cm)
- Weight: 185 lb (84 kg; 13 st 3 lb)
- Position: Right wing
- Shot: Right
- Played for: WHA; New York Raiders; New York Golden Blades; Jersey Knights; San Diego Mariners; Indianapolis Racers; Edmonton Oilers
- NHL draft: 50th overall, 1971; Philadelphia Flyers
- Playing career: 1971–1977

Edward Wilson "Ted" Scharf (born October 3, 1951) is a Canadian former professional ice hockey player. He played 238 games in the WHA with the New York Raiders, New York Golden Blades, Jersey Knights, San Diego Mariners, Indianapolis Racers, and Edmonton Oilers.

== Career statistics ==
			Regular season					Playoffs
Season	Team	League	GP	G	A	Pts	PIM	GP	G	A	Pts	PIM
1968–69	Kitchener Rangers	OHA-Jr.	52	10	7	17	67	—	—	—	—	—
1969–70	Kitchener Rangers	OHA-Jr.	28	7	3	10	52	—	—	—	—	—
1970–71	Kitchener Rangers	OHA-Jr.	60	15	15	30	154	—	—	—	—	—
1971–72	Jersey Devils	EHL-Sr.	75	24	33	57	221	—	—	—	—	—
1972–73	Long Island Ducks	EHL-Sr.	29	8	8	16	101	—	—	—	—	—
1972–73	New York Raiders	WHA	29	2	2	4	72	—	—	—	—	—
1973–74	Syracuse Blazers	NAHL-Sr.	2	2	1	3	15	—	—	—	—	—
1973–74	New York Golden Blades/Jersey Knights	WHA	63	4	2	6	107	—	—	—	—	—
1974–75	San Diego Mariners	WHA	67	3	1	4	94	7	0	0	0	0
1975–76	Indianapolis Racers	WHA	74	7	13	20	56	7	0	0	0	5
1975–76	Mohawk Valley Comets	NAHL-Sr.	3	0	0	0	4	—	—	—	—	—
1976–77	Edmonton Oilers	WHA	5	0	2	2	14	—	—	—	—	—
1976–77	Mohawk Valley Comets	NAHL-Sr.	22	6	9	15	33	5	0	4	4	47
1976–77	Hampton Gulls	SHL-Sr.	43	11	15	26	96	—	—	—	—	—
WHA totals			238	16	20	36	343	14	0	0	0	5
