= Ron Plumb =

Canadian ice hockey player (born 1950)

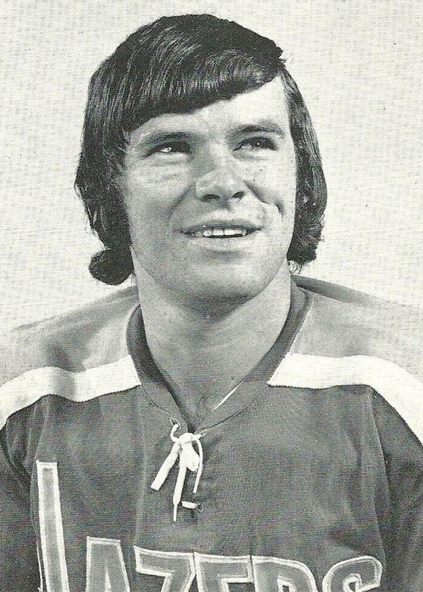
- 1972-73 card of Plumb
- Born: July 17, 1950 (age 75) Kingston, Ontario, Canada
- Height: 5 ft 10 in (178 cm)
- Weight: 175 lb (79 kg; 12 st 7 lb)
- Position: Defence
- Shot: Left
- Played for: Philadelphia Blazers; Vancouver Blazers; San Diego Mariners; Cincinnati Stingers; New England Whalers; Hartford Whalers
- NHL draft: 9th overall, 1970; Boston Bruins
- Playing career: 1970–1986

Ronald William Plumb (born July 17, 1950) is a Canadian former professional ice hockey defenceman. Ron is the brother of Robert Plumb.

== Playing career ==
Plumb was born in Kingston, Ontario. A Peterborough Petes junior player who won the Max Kaminsky Trophy as the league's best defenceman in 1970, Plumb was drafted ninth overall by the Boston Bruins in the 1970 NHL Amateur Draft. After two seasons with their Central Hockey League farm club Oklahoma City Blazers, the Bruins protected him in the June, 1972 expansion draft. But with little chance to play with the veteran-laden NHL team, he jumped to the unproven World Hockey Association Philadelphia Blazers only weeks later.

He remained with the Blazers as they moved to Vancouver in the following season. Plumb then played for the San Diego Mariners in 1975, the Cincinnati Stingers for the following three seasons, and the New England Whalers. He then played one season in the National Hockey League with the Hartford Whalers, remaining in the organization for two more years, but playing in the AHL with the Springfield Indians.

In the WHA, Plumb won the Dennis A. Murphy Trophy as the WHA's best defenceman in 1977, and was also selected a First or Second Team All-Star for much of the league's history. Plumb played 549 career games in the WHA, the second most in league history next to André Lacroix, who was his teammate in Philadelphia, San Diego and New England.

Plumb followed his North American pro career with three seasons in Europe, 1983 with ERC Freiburg in the 2.Bundesliga, then 1984–1986 with the Fife Flyers in the British Hockey League.

== Honours ==
Plumb was inducted into the Kingston and District Sports Hall of Fame on May 2, 2008.

In 2010, he was elected as an inaugural inductee into the World Hockey Association Hall of Fame.

== Career statistics ==
			Regular season					Playoffs
Season	Team	League	GP	G	A	Pts	PIM	GP	G	A	Pts	PIM
1967–68	Peterborough Petes	OHA-Jr.	47	3	19	22	38	5	0	2	2	7
1968–69	Peterborough Petes	OHA-Jr.	53	4	10	14	57	10	2	1	3	19
1969–70	Peterborough Petes	OHA-Jr.	54	16	29	45	77	6	2	3	5	19
1970–71	Oklahoma City Blazers	CHL	72	3	19	22	73	5	0	0	0	12
1971–72	Oklahoma City Blazers	CHL	72	10	42	52	90	6	1	2	3	8
1972–73	Philadelphia Blazers	WHA	78	10	41	51	66	4	0	2	2	13
1973–74	Vancouver Blazers	WHA	75	6	32	38	40	—	—	—	—	—
1974–75	San Diego Mariners	WHA	78	10	38	48	56	10	2	3	5	19
1975–76	Cincinnati Stingers	WHA	80	10	36	46	31	—	—	—	—	—
1976–77	Cincinnati Stingers	WHA	79	11	58	69	52	4	1	2	3	0
1977–78	Cincinnati Stingers	WHA	53	13	34	47	45	—	—	—	—	—
1977–78	New England Whalers	WHA	27	1	9	10	18	14	1	5	6	16
1978–79	New England Whalers	WHA	78	4	16	20	33	9	1	3	4	0
1979–80	Hartford Whalers	NHL	26	3	4	7	14	—	—	—	—	—
1979–80	Springfield Indians	AHL	52	2	20	22	42	—	—	—	—	—
1980–81	Springfield Indians	AHL	79	11	51	62	150	7	3	6	9	8
1981–82	Springfield Indians	AHL	80	4	31	35	56	—	—	—	—	—
1982–83	EHC Freiburg II	FRG II	36	14	38	52	72	—	—	—	—	—
1984–85	Fife Flyers	GBR	36	26	54	80	88	9	3	14	17	14
1985–86	Fife Flyers	GBR	36	20	51	71	76	5	0	4	4	8
WHA totals			549	65	264	329	341	41	5	15	20	48
AHL totals			211	17	102	119	248	7	3	6	9	8

== See also ==
- List of WHA seasons
- List of AHL seasons

Preceded by Rick MacLeish	Boston Bruins first-round draft pick 1970	Succeeded by Bob Stewart
