= Reg Krezanski =

Canadian ice hockey player

- Born: January 1, 1948 (age 78) New Westminster, British Columbia, Canada
- Height: 5 ft 11 in (180 cm)
- Weight: 194 lb (88 kg; 13 st 12 lb)
- Position: Defence
- Shot: Right
- Played for: San Diego Mariners; FPS
- Playing career: 1969–1979

Reg Krezanski (born January 1, 1948, in New Westminster, British Columbia) is a former Canadian professional ice hockey player who played in the World Hockey Association (WHA). He played 2 games for the San Diego Mariners during the 1974–75 WHA season. He also played in the Finnish SM-liiga for FPS during the 1976–77 SM-liiga season.

== Career statistics ==
=== Regular season and playoffs ===
			Regular season					Playoffs
Season	Team	League	GP	G	A	Pts	PIM	GP	G	A	Pts	PIM
1965–66	Winnipeg Monarchs	MJHL	Statistics Unavailable
1966–67	Winnipeg Monarchs	MJHL	Statistics Unavailable
1968–69	Winnipeg Jets	WCHL	44	6	9	15	62	—	—	—	—	—
1969–70	Dayton–Columbus	IHL	68	1	13	14	114	—	—	—	—	—
1970–71	Long Island Ducks	EHL	43	2	24	26	58	—	—	—	—	—
1970–71	Dayton Gems	IHL	16	1	13	14	19	—	—	—	—	—
1971–72	Long Island Ducks	EHL	66	3	26	29	112	—	—	—	—	—
1972–73	Long Island–Cape Cod	EHL	79	6	40	46	166	—	—	—	—	—
1973–74	Syracuse Blazers	NAHL	73	4	33	37	120	15	3	6	9	14
1974–75	San Diego Mariners	WHA	2	0	0	0	2	—	—	—	—	—
1974–75	Syracuse Blazers	NAHL	72	9	55	64	159	7	0	5	5	18
1975–76	Rochester Americans	AHL	1	0	0	0	2	—	—	—	—	—
1975–76	Cape Codders	NAHL	51	10	37	47	110	—	—	—	—	—
1975–76	Syracuse Blazers	NAHL	12	4	4	8	33	8	2	4	6	18
1976–77	Syracuse Blazers	NAHL	45	7	27	34	69	9	1	3	4	32
1976–77	FoPS Forssa	SM–liiga	17	2	4	6	34	—	—	—	—	—
1977–78	San Diego Mariners	PHL	42	6	19	25	74	—	—	—	—	—
1978–79	San Diego Hawks	PHL	16	0	5	5	38	—	—	—	—	—
1978–79	Tucson Rustlers	PHL	10	0	4	4	8	—	—	—	—	—
WHA totals			2	0	0	0	2	—	—	—	—	—
