= Wayne Rivers =

Canadian ice hockey player

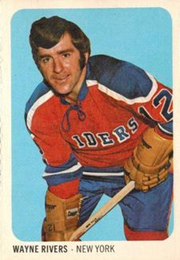
- Born: February 1, 1942 (age 84) Hamilton, Ontario, Canada
- Height: 5 ft 10 in (178 cm)
- Weight: 180 lb (82 kg; 12 st 12 lb)
- Position: Right wing
- Shot: Right
- Played for: NHL; Detroit Red Wings; Boston Bruins; St. Louis Blues; New York Rangers; WHA; New York Raiders; New York Golden Blades; Jersey Knights; San Diego Mariners
- Playing career: 1962–1979

Wayne Rivers (born February 1, 1942) is a Canadian former professional ice hockey player. He played 108 games in the National Hockey League and 357 games in the World Hockey Association.

During the 1977–78 season, Rivers coached the San Francisco Shamrocks to win the Pacific Hockey League championship.

== Career statistics ==
=== Regular season and playoffs ===
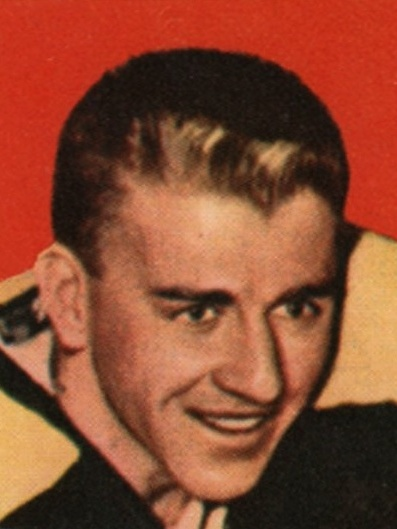
Rivers in 1963 Topps card

			Regular season					Playoffs
Season	Team	League	GP	G	A	Pts	PIM	GP	G	A	Pts	PIM
1959–60	Hamilton Red Wings	OHA	—	—	—	—	—	—	—	—	—	—
1959–60	Hamilton Tiger Cubs	OHA	2	0	0	0	2	—	—	—	—	—
1960–61	Hamilton Red Wings	OHA	41	13	18	31	38	4	0	0	0	21
1961–62	Hamilton Red Wings	OHA	48	14	15	29	55	10	2	1	3	20
1961–62	Hamilton Red Wings	M-Cup	—	—	—	—	—	14	10	5	15	43
1961–62	Detroit Red Wings	NHL	2	0	0	0	0	—	—	—	—	—
1961–62	Hershey Bears	AHL	1	0	0	0	0	—	—	—	—	—
1962–63	Hershey Bears	AHL	52	15	31	46	42	12	0	0	0	13
1963–64	Boston Bruins	NHL	12	2	7	9	6	—	—	—	—	—
1963–64	Hershey Bears	AHL	36	20	6	26	24	—	—	—	—	—
1964–65	Boston Bruins	NHL	58	6	17	23	72	—	—	—	—	—
1964–65	Hershey Bears	AHL	14	6	8	14	0	—	—	—	—	—
1965–66	Boston Bruins	NHL	2	1	1	2	2	—	—	—	—	—
1965–66	Hershey Bears	AHL	65	37	30	67	81	3	1	0	1	2
1966–67	Boston Bruins	NHL	8	2	1	3	6	—	—	—	—	—
1966–67	Hershey Bears	AHL	54	30	37	67	59	5	0	2	2	4
1967–68	St. Louis Blues	NHL	22	4	4	8	8	—	—	—	—	—
1967–68	Kansas City Blue	CHL	50	25	37	62	41	7	6	1	7	9
1968–69	New York Rangers	NHL	4	0	0	0	0	—	—	—	—	—
1968–69	Buffalo Bisons	AHL	67	30	37	67	35	6	3	5	8	0
1969–70	Buffalo Bisons	AHL	68	27	34	61	58	14	3	9	12	6
1969–70	Omaha Knights	CHL	—	—	—	—	—	6	3	4	7	7
1970–71	Baltimore Clippers	AHL	65	38	37	75	66	6	3	2	5	6
1971–72	Springfield Kings	AHL	68	48	33	81	67	5	0	3	3	4
1972–73	New York Raiders	WHA	75	37	40	77	47	—	—	—	—	—
1973–74	New York Golden Blades/Jersey Knights	WHA	73	30	27	57	20	—	—	—	—	—
1974–75	San Diego Mariners	WHA	78	54	53	107	52	5	3	1	4	8
1975–76	San Diego Mariners	WHA	71	19	25	44	24	11	4	4	8	4
1976–77	San Diego Mariners	WHA	60	18	31	49	40	7	1	1	2	2
1977–78	San Francisco Shamrocks	PHL	32	11	22	33	7	—	—	—	—	—
1978–79	San Francisco Shamrocks	PHL	15	4	5	9	25	—	—	—	—	—
WHA totals			357	158	176	334	183	23	8	6	14	14
NHL totals			108	15	30	45	94	—	—	—	—	—
