= Bob Blanchet =

Canadian ice hockey player (born 1954)

- Born: February 24, 1954 (age 72) Authier-Nord, Quebec, Canada
- Height: 5 ft 8 in (173 cm)
- Weight: 174 lb (79 kg; 12 st 6 lb)
- Position: Goaltender
- Caught: Left
- Played for: San Diego Mariners
- NHL draft: 228th overall, 1974; Washington Capitals
- WHA draft: 217th overall, 1974; San Diego Mariners
- Playing career: 1974–1978

Robert Bertrand "Bob" Blanchet (born February 24, 1954) is a Canadian former professional ice hockey player who played in the World Hockey Association (WHA). Drafted in the seventeenth round of the 1974 NHL amateur draft by the Washington Capitals, Blanchet opted to play in the WHA after being selected by the San Diego Mariners in the fourteenth round of the 1974 WHA Amateur Draft. He played parts of two seasons for the Mariners.

== Career statistics ==
=== Regular season and playoffs ===
			Regular season									Playoffs
Season	Team	League	GP	W	L	T	MIN	GA	SO	GAA	SV%	GP	W	L	MIN	GA	SO	GAA	SV%
1971–72	Kitchener Rangers	OHA	11	–	–	–	–	39	0	3.55	–	–	–	–	–	–	–	–	–
1972–73	Kitchener Rangers	OHA	63	–	–	–	–	–	–	–	–	–	–	–	–	–	–	–	–
1973–74	Kitchener Rangers	OHA		–	–	–	1149	67	0	3.50		–	–	–	–	–	–	–	–
1974–75	Syracuse Blazers	NAHL	37	22	12	2	2169	106	4	2.93		1	–	–	–	–	–	–	–
1974–75	San Diego Mariners	WHA	3	2	1	0	179	7	1	2.35	.900	–	–	–	–	–	–	–	–
1975–76	Broome County Dusters	NAHL	31	10	16	1	1765	128	0	4.35		–	–	–	–	–	–	–	–
1975–76	San Diego Mariners	WHA	1	0	1	0	32	4	0	7.50	.833	–	–	–	–	–	–	–	–
1976–77	Oklahoma City Blazers	CHL	6	0	3	0	265	27	0	6.11	.847	–	–	–	–	–	–	–	–
1976–77	Charlotte Checkers	SHL	7	1	6	0	365	33	0	5.42	.865	–	–	–	–	–	–	–	–
1977–78	Trail Smoke Eaters	WIHL	25	Statistics Unavailable
1979–80	Cambridge Hornets	CSAHL	0	–	–	–	–	–	–	–	–	–	–	–	–	–	–	–	–
WHA totals			4	2	2	0	211	11	1	3.13	.883	—	—	—	—	—	—	—	—

== Awards ==
- 1974–75 NAHL Second All-Star Team
