= Ray Adduono =

Canadian ice hockey player

- Born: January 21, 1947 (age 79) Fort William, Ontario, Canada
- Height: 5 ft 9 in (175 cm)
- Weight: 160 lb (73 kg; 11 st 6 lb)
- Position: Center/left wing
- Shot: Left
- Played for: Cleveland Crusaders; San Diego Mariners; Minnesota Fighting Saints; Indianapolis Racers
- Playing career: 1973–1978

Raymond Jerry Peter Adduono (born January 21, 1947, in Fort William, Ontario) is a retired professional ice hockey player who played 221 games in the World Hockey Association. He played for the Indianapolis Racers, Cleveland Crusaders, Minnesota Fighting Saints, and San Diego Mariners.

== Career statistics ==
=== Regular season and playoffs ===
			Regular season					Playoffs
Season	Team	League	GP	G	A	Pts	PIM	GP	G	A	Pts	PIM
1964–65	Warroad Lakers	Senior	Statistics Unavailable
1967–68	Syracuse Blazers	EHL	72	45	100	145	43	—	—	—	—	—
1967–68	Oklahoma City Blazers	CPHL	1	0	1	1	0	7	1	3	4	23
1968–69	Amarillo Wranglers	CHL	59	16	41	57	41	—	—	—	—	—
1968–69	Hershey Bears	AHL	12	1	2	3	4	—	—	—	—	—
1969–70	Syracuse Blazers	EHL	74	42	92	134	55	4	2	0	2	2
1970–71	Syracuse Blazers	EHL	62	31	70	101	50	6	4	11	15	9
1971–72	Syracuse Blazers	EHL	75	43	122	165	133	17	8	20	28	36
1972–73	Syracuse Blazers	EHL	76	54	116	170	138	14	9	26	35	19
1973–74	Syracuse Blazers	NAHL	20	7	20	27	8	15	8	20	28	14
1973–74	Macon Whoopees	SHL	40	14	38	52	95	—	—	—	—	—
1973–74	Cleveland Crusaders	WHA	2	0	0	0	0	—	—	—	—	—
1974–75	San Diego Mariners	WHA	78	15	59	74	23	10	5	9	14	13
1975–76	San Diego Mariners	WHA	80	23	67	90	22	11	4	7	11	6
1976–77	Minnesota Fighting Saints	WHA	40	4	19	23	17	—	—	—	—	—
1976–77	San Diego Mariners	WHA	13	2	5	7	5	7	3	2	5	18
1977–78	Indianapolis Racers	WHA	8	1	2	3	0	—	—	—	—	—
1978–79	San Diego Hawks	PHL	56	14	61	75	73	—	—	—	—	—
1979–80	Spokane Flyers	WIHL	––	20	70	90	0	—	—	—	—	—
WHA totals			221	45	152	197	67	28	12	18	30	37
