= Tom Trevelyan =

Canadian ice hockey player

- Born: April 8, 1949 (age 77) Toronto, Ontario, Canada
- Height: 5 ft 11 in (180 cm)
- Weight: 185 lb (84 kg; 13 st 3 lb)
- Position: Centre
- Shot: Left
- Played for: San Diego Mariners
- Playing career: 1969–1975

Thomas Trevelyan (born April 8, 1949) is a Canadian former professional ice hockey centre who played 20 games during the 1974–75 WHA season with the San Diego Mariners of the World Hockey Association. As a youth, he played in the 1961 Quebec International Pee-Wee Hockey Tournament with the Scarboro Lions.

== Career statistics ==
=== Regular season and playoffs ===
			Regular season					Playoffs
Season	Team	League	GP	G	A	Pts	PIM	GP	G	A	Pts	PIM
1966–67	Etobicoke Indians	MJBHL	Statistics Unavailable
1967–68	Hamilton Red Wings	OHA	48	7	14	21	4	––	––	––	––	––
1968–69	Hamilton Red Wings	OHA	47	31	33	64	4	––	––	––	––	––
1969–70	Charlotte Checkers	EHL	54	39	38	77	33	10	5	13	18	22
1969–70	Seattle Totems	WHL	3	1	1	2	0	5	3	2	5	4
1970–71	Quebec Aces	AHL	34	8	6	14	20	––	––	––	––	––
1971–72	Richmond Robins	AHL	2	0	0	0	0	––	––	––	––	––
1971–72	Seattle Totems	WHL	47	10	11	21	28	––	––	––	––	––
1971–72	San Diego Gulls	WHL	12	3	5	8	4	––	––	––	––	––
1972–73	San Diego Gulls	WHL	72	25	29	54	70	6	1	2	3	1
1973–74	San Diego Gulls	WHL	74	31	36	67	56	4	1	3	4	4
1974–75	Syracuse Blazers	NAHL	46	28	32	60	44	7	7	3	10	12
1974–75	San Diego Mariners	WHA	20	0	2	2	4	––	––	––	––	––
WHA totals			20	0	2	2	4	—	—	—	—	—
