= Ken Block (ice hockey) =

Canadian ice hockey player

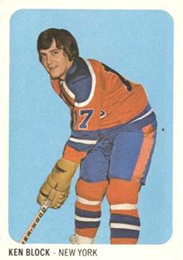
- Born: March 18, 1944 (age 82) Steinbach, Manitoba, Canada
- Height: 5 ft 10 in (178 cm)
- Weight: 185 lb (84 kg; 13 st 3 lb)
- Position: Defence
- Shot: Left
- Played for: Vancouver Canucks; New York Raiders/New York Golden Blades/Jersey Knights; San Diego Mariners; Indianapolis Racers
- Playing career: 1964–1979

Kenneth Richard Block (born March 18, 1944) is a Canadian former professional ice hockey defenseman who played 455 games in the World Hockey Association (WHA) and one game in the National Hockey League (NHL).

== Early life ==
Block was born in Steinbach, Manitoba, and played junior hockey with the Flin Flon Bombers.

== Career ==
Block turned pro in 1964 and spent three seasons in the New York Rangers farm system before being selected by the Los Angeles Kings in the 1967 NHL Expansion Draft. Two days after the draft, he was traded to the Toronto Maple Leafs for the rights to Hall of Famer Red Kelly, who had retired as a player but accepted a job coaching the Kings. Opportunities to break into a deep Toronto squad were slim, and Block spent the next five seasons toiling for the Rochester Americans of the American Hockey League, where he played on the same blueline with and was later coached by Don Cherry.

In 1970, the owners of the WHL Vancouver Canucks were granted an NHL expansion franchise of the same name. Since the Canucks still owned his WHL rights from a stint there several years prior, his NHL rights were transferred to Vancouver. In 1970–71, Vancouver's inaugural season, Block played one NHL game.

Block moved to the upstart World Hockey Association (WHA) in 1972, joining the New York Raiders. During his first season in the WHA, he recorded five goals and 53 assists for 58 points, good for third among WHA defenders in assists and sixth in points. He had another strong season in 1973–74, recording three goals and 43 assists for 46 points. The franchise moved to New Jersey and then to San Diego for the 1974–75 season.

Midway through the 1974–75 campaign, Block was dealt to the Indianapolis Racers, where he played his final five seasons before retiring in 1979. In his last season, he played briefly with Wayne Gretzky before Gretzky was dealt to the Edmonton Oilers. Upon the dissolution of the WHA in 1979 and merger with the NHL, Block was one of the few players to stay in the WHA throughout its existence.

He finished his WHA career 13th all time in games played.

== Career statistics ==
=== Regular season and playoffs ===
			Regular season					Playoffs
Season	Team	League	GP	G	A	Pts	PIM	GP	G	A	Pts	PIM
1962–63	Flin Flon Bombers	SJHL	54	5	11	16	34	6	2	5	7	4
1963–64	Flin Flon Bombers	MJHL	62	14	43	57	59	2	1	3	4	0
1964–65	New York Rovers	EHL	70	5	31	36	51	—	—	—	—	—
1964–65	Baltimore Clippers	AHL	5	0	2	2	2	5	1	0	1	2
1965–66	Baltimore Clippers	AHL	37	2	8	10	6	—	—	—	—	—
1965–66	Minnesota Rangers	CPHL	30	0	6	6	8	—	—	—	—	—
1966–67	Omaha Knights	CPHL	10	0	4	4	6	—	—	—	—	—
1966–67	Vancouver Canucks	WHL	62	8	22	30	18	8	1	3	4	0
1967–68	Memphis South Stars	CPHL	18	5	5	10	24	—	—	—	—	—
1967–68	Vancouver Canucks	WHL	17	2	6	8	4	—	—	—	—	—
1967–68	Rochester Americans	AHL	24	1	1	2	0	—	—	—	—	—
1968–69	Vancouver Canucks	WHL	22	1	2	3	6	—	—	—	—	—
1968–69	Rochester Americans	AHL	45	4	15	19	10	—	—	—	—	—
1969–70	Rochester Americans	AHL	69	9	35	44	51	—	—	—	—	—
1970–71	Vancouver Canucks	NHL	1	0	0	0	0	—	—	—	—	—
1970–71	Rochester Americans	AHL	71	5	33	38	38	—	—	—	—	—
1971–72	Rochester Americans	AHL	71	4	29	33	69	—	—	—	—	—
1972–73	New York Raiders	WHA	78	5	53	58	43	—	—	—	—	—
1973–74	New York Golden Blades/Jersey Knights	WHA	74	3	43	46	22	—	—	—	—	—
1974–75	San Diego Mariners	WHA	36	1	11	12	12	—	—	—	—	—
1974–75	Indianapolis Racers	WHA	37	0	17	17	18	—	—	—	—	—
1975–76	Indianapolis Racers	WHA	79	1	25	26	28	7	0	4	4	2
1976–77	Indianapolis Racers	WHA	52	3	10	13	25	9	0	2	2	6
1977–78	Indianapolis Racers	WHA	77	1	25	26	34	—	—	—	—	—
1978–79	Indianapolis Racers	WHA	22	2	3	5	10	—	—	—	—	—
NHL totals			1	0	0	0	0	—	—	—	—	—
WHA totals			455	16	187	203	192	16	0	6	6	8
AHL totals			322	25	123	148	178	5	1	0	1	2
WHL totals			101	11	30	41	28	8	1	3	4	0
CPHL totals			48	5	11	16	30	—	—	—	—	—

== See also ==
- List of players who played only one game in the NHL
