= Bobby Sheehan (ice hockey) =

American ice hockey player (1948–2026)

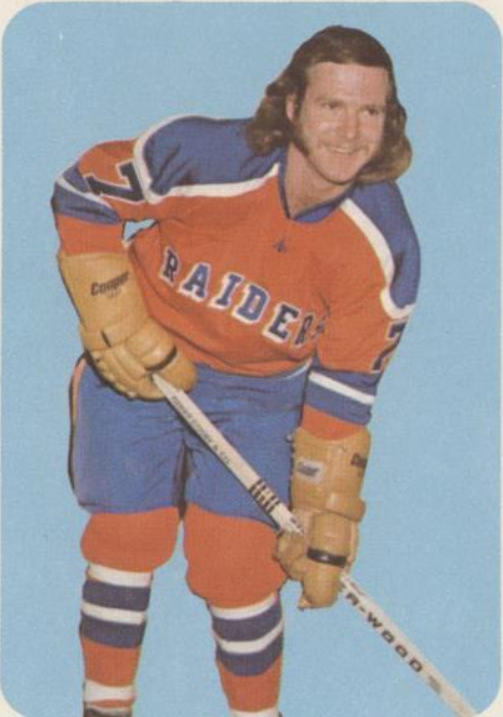
- Sheehan in 1973
- Born: January 11, 1949 Weymouth, Massachusetts, U.S.
- Died: November 7, 2026 (aged 77) Hingham, Massachusetts, U.S.
- Height: 5 ft 8 in (173 cm)
- Weight: 160 lb (73 kg; 11 st 6 lb)
- Position: Center
- Shot: Left
- Played for: Montreal Canadiens; California Golden Seals; New York Raiders; New York Golden Blades/Jersey Knights; Edmonton Oilers; Chicago Black Hawks; Detroit Red Wings; Indianapolis Racers; New York Rangers; Colorado Rockies; Los Angeles Kings
- NHL draft: 32nd overall, 1969; Montreal Canadiens
- Playing career: 1969–1983

Robert Richard Sheehan (January 11, 1949 – November 7, 2026) was an American professional ice hockey player who played in the National Hockey League (NHL) and World Hockey Association (WHA) between 1969 and 1982 as a center.

== Career ==
As a youth, Sheehan played in the inaugural 1960 Quebec International Pee-Wee Hockey Tournament with the junior Boston Bruins. A small player by hockey standards, Sheehan made up for his physical deficits by leading the NSJHL minor league with 64 goals his rookie year. He was drafted in the third round, 32nd overall by the Montreal Canadiens and went on to play parts of three seasons in the NHL. He was a reserve on the Canadiens Stanley Cup-champion team in 1971 and then joined the lowly California Golden Seals where he quickly became a regular and one of the top forwards for his new club.

In 1972, Sheehan joined the New York Raiders of the World Hockey Association, who had obtained his WHA rights from the New England Whalers. From 1975 to 1976, he returned to the NHL with the Chicago Black Hawks and would transfer between the NHL and American Hockey League (AHL) — plus another stop in the WHA — several times until his retirement in 1983.

After spending the entire 1978–1979 regular season with the New Haven Nighthawks of the AHL, Sheehan was called up by the New York Rangers to center Pat Hickey and Ron Duguay in the playoffs, which ultimately led to the 1979 Stanley Cup Final, which they lost to the Montreal Canadiens in five games. In 15 playoff games, Sheehan had four goals and three assists and incurred eight penalty minutes.

In a career total of 310 NHL games, Sheehan recorded 48 goals and 63 assists for 111 points.

== Death ==
Sheehan died in Hingham, Massachusetts, on November 7, 2026, at the age of 78.

== International play ==
Sheehan represented the United States at the 1981 Ice Hockey World Championship tournament. He scored one goal and one assist in eight games.

== Career statistics ==
=== Regular season and playoffs ===
| | | | Regular season | | | | | Playoffs |
| Season | Team | League | GP | G | A | Pts | PIM | GP | G | A | Pts | PIM |
|---|---|---|---|---|---|---|---|---|---|---|---|---|
| 1966–67 | Halifax Junior Canadiens | MJrHL | 50 | 64 | 51 | 115 | 21 | 17 | 24 | 28 | 52 | 19 |
| 1967–68 | Halifax Junior Canadiens | MJrHL | 44 | 51 | 47 | 98 | 25 | 4 | 6 | 5 | 11 | 0 |
| 1968–69 | St. Catharines Black Hawks | OHA | 44 | 44 | 41 | 85 | 6 | 18 | 10 | 13 | 23 | 2 |
| 1969–70 | Montreal Canadiens | NHL | 16 | 2 | 1 | 3 | 2 | — | — | — | — | — |
| 1969–70 | Montreal Voyageurs | AHL | 46 | 16 | 27 | 43 | 8 | 8 | 2 | 2 | 4 | 4 |
| 1970–71 | Montreal Canadiens | NHL | 29 | 6 | 5 | 11 | 2 | 6 | 0 | 0 | 0 | 0 |
| 1970–71 | Montreal Voyageurs | AHL | 35 | 24 | 21 | 45 | 14 | 5 | 0 | 1 | 1 | 4 |
| 1971–72 | California Golden Seals | NHL | 78 | 20 | 26 | 46 | 12 | — | — | — | — | — |
| 1972–73 | New York Raiders | WHA | 75 | 35 | 53 | 88 | 17 | — | — | — | — | — |
| 1973–74 | New York Golden Blades/Jersey Knights | WHA | 50 | 12 | 8 | 20 | 8 | — | — | — | — | — |
| 1973–74 | Edmonton Oilers | WHA | 10 | 1 | 3 | 4 | 6 | — | — | — | — | — |
| 1974–75 | Edmonton Oilers | WHA | 77 | 19 | 39 | 58 | 16 | — | — | — | — | — |
| 1975–76 | Chicago Black Hawks | NHL | 78 | 11 | 20 | 31 | 8 | 4 | 0 | 0 | 0 | 0 |
| 1976–77 | Detroit Red Wings | NHL | 34 | 5 | 4 | 9 | 2 | — | — | — | — | — |
| 1976–77 | Rhode Island Reds | AHL | 36 | 28 | 26 | 54 | 18 | — | — | — | — | — |
| 1977–78 | Indianapolis Racers | WHA | 29 | 8 | 7 | 15 | 6 | — | — | — | — | — |
| 1977–78 | New Haven Nighthawks | AHL | 43 | 13 | 26 | 39 | 14 | 15 | 7 | 5 | 12 | 4 |
| 1978–79 | New Haven Nighthawks | AHL | 70 | 33 | 48 | 81 | 26 | — | — | — | — | — |
| 1978–79 | New York Rangers | NHL | — | — | — | — | — | 15 | 4 | 3 | 7 | 8 |
| 1979–80 | New Haven Nighthawks | AHL | 13 | 8 | 7 | 15 | 2 | — | — | — | — | — |
| 1979–80 | Colorado Rockies | NHL | 30 | 3 | 4 | 7 | 2 | — | — | — | — | — |
| 1979–80 | Fort Worth Texans | CHL | 31 | 18 | 20 | 38 | 14 | — | — | — | — | — |
| 1980–81 | Colorado Rockies | NHL | 41 | 1 | 3 | 4 | 10 | — | — | — | — | — |
| 1981–82 | Los Angeles Kings | NHL | 4 | 0 | 0 | 0 | 0 | — | — | — | — | — |
| 1981–82 | New Haven Nighthawks | AHL | 74 | 21 | 17 | 38 | 32 | 4 | 0 | 2 | 2 | 0 |
| 1982–83 | Binghamton Whalers | AHL | 48 | 7 | 18 | 25 | 6 | 5 | 1 | 1 | 2 | 0 |
| WHA totals | | | 241 | 75 | 110 | 185 | 53 | — | — | — | — | — |
| NHL totals | | | 310 | 48 | 63 | 111 | 40 | 25 | 4 | 3 | 7 | 8 |

=== International ===
| Year | Team | Event | GP | G | A | Pts | PIM |
|---|---|---|---|---|---|---|---|
| 1981 | United States | WC | 8 | 1 | 1 | 2 | 0 |
| Senior totals | | | 8 | 1 | 1 | 2 | 0 |

== Achievements and awards ==
- MJrHL scoring champion (1966–67)
- Stanley Cup champion (1971)
- Selected to play in WHA All-Star Game (1973, 1974)
- AHL Second All-Star Team (1979)
