= Jamie Bateman =

Canadian ice hockey player

- Born: September 16, 1954 (age 71) Thetford Mines, Quebec, Canada
- Height: 6 ft 1 in (185 cm)
- Weight: 190 lb (86 kg; 13 st 8 lb)
- Position: Left wing/Defence
- Shot: Left
- Played for: San Diego Mariners
- NHL draft: 90th overall, 1974; Boston Bruins
- WHA draft: 51st overall, 1974; San Diego Mariners
- Playing career: 1974–1977

James Bateman (born September 16, 1954) is a Canadian former professional ice hockey player who played in the World Hockey Association (WHA). Drafted in the fifth round of the 1974 NHL amateur draft by the Boston Bruins, Bateman opted to play in the WHA after being selected by the San Diego Mariners in the fourth round of the 1974 WHA Amateur Draft. He played parts of two seasons for the Mariners.

== Career statistics ==
			Regular season					Playoffs
Season	Team	League	GP	G	A	Pts	PIM	GP	G	A	Pts	PIM
1970–71	Saint-Jérôme Alouettes	QMJHL	62	7	10	17	115	5	0	1	1	2
1972–73	Quebec Remparts	QMJHL	56	15	13	28	153	14	3	5	8	16
1973–74	Quebec Remparts	QMJHL	65	19	37	56	268	13	8	3	11	67
1974–75	Syracuse Blazers	NAHL-Sr.	30	5	7	12	45	—	—	—	—	—
1974–75	San Diego Mariners	WHA	24	0	3	3	96	5	0	0	0	16
1975–76	Broome Dusters	NAHL-Sr.	8	0	5	5	41	—	—	—	—	—
1975–76	Roanoke Valley Rebels	SHL-Sr.	11	1	6	7	25	6	1	2	3	26
1975–76	San Diego Mariners	WHA	7	1	0	1	4	—	—	—	—	—
1976–77	Greensboro Generals	SHL-Sr.	25	2	5	7	60	—	—	—	—	—
WHA totals			31	1	3	4	100	5	0	0	0	16
NAHL-Sr. totals			38	5	12	17	86	—	—	—	—	—
SHL-Sr. totals			36	3	11	14	85	6	1	2	3	26
