= Brad Rhiness =

Canadian ice hockey player (born 1956)

- Born: November 6, 1956 (age 69) Huntsville, Ontario, Canada
- Height: 5 ft 9 in (175 cm)
- Weight: 180 lb (82 kg; 12 st 12 lb)
- Position: Centre
- Shot: Left
- Played for: San Diego Mariners; Indianapolis Racers
- NHL draft: 114th overall, 1976; Vancouver Canucks
- WHA draft: 6th overall, 1974; San Diego Mariners
- Playing career: 1976–1982

Brad Rhiness (born November 6, 1956) is a Canadian former professional ice hockey centre who played in the World Hockey Association (WHA).

== Career ==
Drafted in the first round of the 1974 WHA Amateur Draft by the San Diego Mariners, Rhiness played parts of two WHA seasons with the Mariners and Indianapolis Racers. He was also drafted in the seventh round of the 1976 NHL Amateur Draft by the Vancouver Canucks.

== Career statistics ==
=== Regular season and playoffs ===
			Regular season					Playoffs
Season	Team	League	GP	G	A	Pts	PIM	GP	G	A	Pts	PIM
1972–73	Aurora Tigers	OPJHL	44	21	25	46	0	––	––	––	––	––
1973–74	Kingston Canadians	OHA	53	21	15	36	42	––	––	––	––	––
1974–75	Kingston Canadians	OHA	68	41	54	95	65	––	––	––	––	––
1975–76	Kingston Canadians	OHA	65	52	60	112	28	––	––	––	––	––
1976–77	Oklahoma City Blazers	CHL	15	9	4	13	10	––	––	––	––	––
1976–77	San Diego Mariners	WHA	58	9	14	23	14	5	0	1	1	0
1977–78	Philadelphia Firebirds	AHL	35	10	8	18	8	1	0	0	0	0
1977–78	Indianapolis Racers	WHA	12	3	3	6	2	––	––	––	––	––
1978–79	Erie Blades	NEHL	69	52	68	120	12	12	8	8	16	2
1979–80	Syracuse Firebirds	AHL	13	3	4	7	0	––	––	––	––	––
1979–80	Erie Blades	EHL	56	23	41	64	27	9	2	10	12	4
1980–81	Erie Blades	EHL	58	25	23	48	62	––	––	––	––	––
1981–82	Muskegon Mohawks	IHL	18	4	8	12	2	––	––	––	––	––
1981–82	Erie Blades	AHL	21	3	2	5	0	––	––	––	––	––
WHA totals			70	12	17	29	16	5	0	1	1	0

== Awards ==
- 1978–79 NEHL Second All-Star Team
