= Jim Hargreaves =

Canadian ice hockey player (1950–2020)

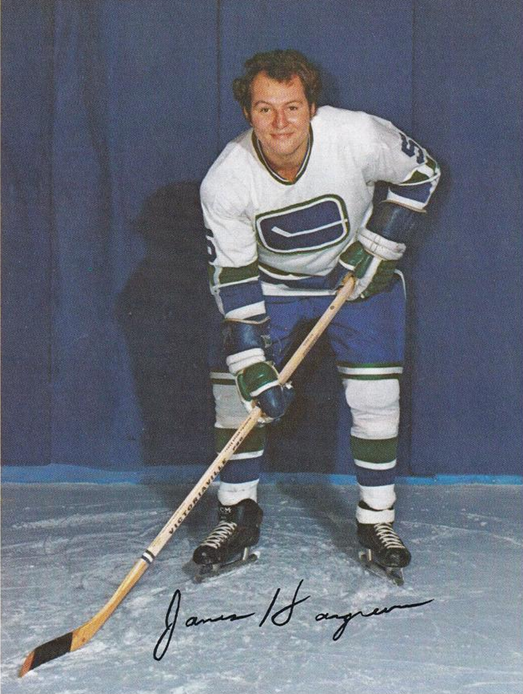
- Hargreaves in 1972 photo
- Born: May 2, 1950 Winnipeg, Manitoba, Canada
- Died: June 30, 2020 (aged 70) Port Alberni, British Columbia, Canada
- Height: 5 ft 11 in (180 cm)
- Weight: 195 lb (88 kg; 13 st 13 lb)
- Position: Defence
- Shot: Right
- Played for: Vancouver Canucks; Winnipeg Jets (WHA); Indianapolis Racers (WHA); San Diego Mariners (WHA)
- NHL draft: 16th overall, 1970; Vancouver Canucks
- Playing career: 1970–1976

James Albert Hargreaves (May 2, 1950 – June 30, 2020) was a Canadian professional ice hockey defenceman. Hargreaves played junior hockey with the Winnipeg Jets of the Western Canada Hockey League, and was selected in the second round of the 1970 NHL Amateur Draft by the Vancouver Canucks of the National Hockey League. He played 66 games for the Canucks over the next three years, splitting time with their minor league affiliates in the American Hockey League and Western Hockey League. In 1973 he moved to the World Hockey Association (WHA), signing with the professional Winnipeg Jets. After one year in Winnipeg Hargreaves briefly joined the Indianapolis Racers before finishing his career with the San Diego Mariners, finishing with 174 games in the WHA. He retired from hockey in 1976. He died in 2020 at the age of 70.

== Career statistics ==
=== Regular season and playoffs ===
			Regular season					Playoffs
Season	Team	League	GP	G	A	Pts	PIM	GP	G	A	Pts	PIM
1966–67	Winnipeg Monarchs	MJHL	—	—	—	—	—	—	—	—	—	—
1968–69	Winnipeg Jets	WCHL	56	10	19	29	107	—	—	—	—	—
1969–70	Winnipeg Jets	WCHL	55	10	34	44	176	—	—	—	—	—
1970–71	Vancouver Canucks	NHL	7	0	1	1	33	—	—	—	—	—
1970–71	Rochester Americans	AHL	42	1	10	11	109	—	—	—	—	—
1971–72	Rochester Americans	AHL	61	3	10	13	127	—	—	—	—	—
1972–73	Vancouver Canucks	NHL	59	1	6	7	72	—	—	—	—	—
1972–73	Seattle Totems	WHL	17	1	11	12	43	—	—	—	—	—
1973–74	Winnipeg Jets	WHA	53	1	4	5	50	—	—	—	—	—
1974–75	Indianapolis Racers	WHA	37	2	5	7	30	—	—	—	—	—
1974–75	San Diego Mariners	WHA	41	8	10	18	45	10	1	0	1	6
1975–76	San Diego Mariners	WHA	43	1	1	2	26	5	0	0	0	2
WHA totals			174	12	20	32	151	15	1	0	1	8
NHL totals			66	1	7	8	105	—	—	—	—	—

== Awards ==
- WCHL All-Star Team – 1970
