= Kevin Devine (ice hockey) =

Canadian ice hockey player and executive

- Born: December 9, 1954 (age 70); Charlottetown, PEI, Canada
- Height: 5 ft 8 in (173 cm)
- Weight: 165 lb (75 kg; 11 st 11 lb)
- Position: Left wing
- Shot: Left
- Played for: New York Islanders; Indianapolis Racers; Quebec Nordiques; San Diego Mariners
- NHL draft: 121st overall, 1974; Toronto Maple Leafs
- WHA draft: 21st overall, 1974; San Diego Mariners
- Playing career: 1974–1985

Kevin Devine (born December 9, 1954) is a Canadian former professional ice hockey player who played 288 games in the World Hockey Association and 2 games in the National Hockey League. He played for the Indianapolis Racers, Quebec Nordiques, New York Islanders, and San Diego Mariners between 1974 and 1982.

== Career statistics ==
=== Regular season and playoffs ===
			Regular season					Playoffs
Season	Team	League	GP	G	A	Pts	PIM	GP	G	A	Pts	PIM
1970–71	Charlottetown Islanders	MJrHL	40	11	22	33	90	—	—	—	—	—
1971–72	Toronto Marlboros	OHA	55	5	12	17	86	—	—	—	—	—
1972–73	Toronto Marlboros	OHA	58	30	40	70	150	—	—	—	—	—
1972–73	Toronto Marlboros	M-Cup	—	—	—	—	—	3	0	2	2	4
1973–74	Toronto Marlboros	OHA	67	40	29	69	218	—	—	—	—	—
1974–75	Syracuse Blazers	NAHL	27	11	12	23	23	—	—	—	—	—
1974–75	San Diego Mariners	WHA	46	4	10	14	48	10	1	0	1	14
1975–76	San Diego Mariners	WHA	80	21	28	49	102	11	3	1	4	36
1976–77	San Diego Mariners	WHA	81	30	20	50	114	7	1	3	4	14
1977–78	Indianapolis Racers	WHA	76	19	23	42	141	—	—	—	—	—
1978–79	San Diego Hawks	PHL	58	36	36	72	119	—	—	—	—	—
1978–79	Quebec Nordiques	WHA	5	0	0	0	6	—	—	—	—	—
1979–80	Indianapolis Checkers	CHL	79	27	26	53	171	7	1	1	2	26
1980–81	Indianapolis Checkers	CHL	80	28	26	54	153	5	3	0	3	10
1981–82	Indianapolis Checkers	CHL	80	24	27	51	199	13	8	1	9	32
1982–83	New York Islanders	NHL	2	0	1	1	8	—	—	—	—	—
1982–83	Indianapolis Checkers	CHL	78	21	27	48	245	13	4	7	11	14
1983–84	Indianapolis Checkers	CHL	71	23	30	51	201	10	4	3	7	8
1984–85	Indianapolis Checkers	IHL	78	16	35	51	139	7	0	4	4	38
WHA totals			288	74	81	155	411	28	5	4	9	64
NHL totals			2	0	1	1	8	—	—	—	—	—
