= Glenn Critch =

Canadian ice hockey player

- Born: June 27, 1954 St. John's, Newfoundland, Canada
- Position: Centre
- Played for: Indianapolis Racers
- NHL draft: Undrafted
- Playing career: 1974–1985

Glenn Critch (born June 27, 1954) was a Canadian professional ice hockey player.

He began his career with the St. John's Capital's, earning the title of Senior Rookie of the Year in the 1974–75 season.

During the 1975–76 season, Critch played three games in the World Hockey Association (WHA) with the Indianapolis Racers. He returned to St. John's in 1976 and rejoined the Capital's (called the "Caps" locally), with whom he won the Herder Memorial Trophy twice. Overall, his provincial senior career lasted eight years, and he totalled 132 goals and 250 points in only 118 games. He earned a place of 11th best Newfoundland hockey player of all time with 15 goals and 24 points in Allan Cup play.

Critch was inducted into the player category of the Newfoundland and Labrador Hockey Hall of Fame in June 2017.

== Career statistics ==
=== Regular season and playoffs ===
			Regular season					Playoffs
Season	Team	League	GP	G	A	Pts	PIM	GP	G	A	Pts	PIM
1974–75	St. John's Capitals	Senior	Statistics Unavailable
1975–76	Indianapolis Racers	WHA	3	0	0	0	0	—	—	—	—	—
1975–76	St. John's Capitals	Senior	Statistics Unavailable
WHA totals			3	0	0	0	0	—	—	—	—	—
