= André Lacroix (ice hockey) =

Canadian ice hockey player (1945–2026)

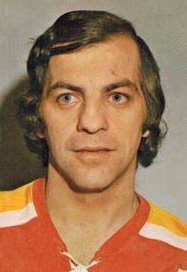
- Lacroix in 1973
- Born: June 5, 1945 Lauzon, Quebec, Canada
- Died: October 27, 2026 (aged 81) Chagrin Falls, Ohio, U.S.
- Height: 5 ft 8 in (173 cm)
- Weight: 175 lb (79 kg; 12 st 7 lb)
- Position: Centre
- Shot: Left
- Played for: Philadelphia Flyers; Chicago Black Hawks; Philadelphia Blazers; New York Golden Blades; Jersey Knights; San Diego Mariners; Houston Aeros; New England Whalers; Hartford Whalers
- National team: Canada
- Playing career: 1964–1980

André Joseph Lacroix (la-KWAH; June 5, 1945 – October 27, 2026) was a Canadian professional ice hockey player in the National Hockey League (NHL) and the World Hockey Association (WHA). As a youth, Lacroix excelled as a centre for the minor league Peterborough Petes and Quebec Aces before finding his way into the NHL with the Philadelphia Flyers in the middle of the 1967–68 season. He recorded 14 points in 18 games to close out the season before becoming part of a forward line that saw him lead the team in points in the next two seasons with 50 points each. He closed out his tenure in Philadelphia with his third straight 20-goal season before being traded to the Chicago Black Hawks, where he struggled for one season.

In 1972, with the advent of the newly created WHA, Lacroix joined the Philadelphia Blazers and immediately had his best season as a professional at the time with 50 goals and 74 assists to win the scoring trophy. Refusing to move with the team to Vancouver, they traded him after one season to the New York Golden Blades. Despite organizational troubles that saw the team move multiple times to Jersey and San Diego, Lacroix had a 100-point season in each of the four seasons he played with the franchise, which included a historic 1974-75 season where he had 106 assists to make him the only WHA player with 100 assists for a season and win the scoring title once again. Lacroix played with the Houston Aeros in 1977-78 before the team folded and had his sixth and final 100-point season. In the final season of the WHA, Lacroix played for the New England Whalers and had 88 points. In 1979, the team joined the NHL, and he played one more season with them, recording 17 points in 29 games to close his career out at the age of 34. As the only player in WHA history with six 100-point seasons, Lacroix was the all-time WHA leader in points with 798 in 551 games and is often referred to as one of the best players in the history of the WHA. He was inducted into the World Hockey Association Hall of Fame in 2010 as an inaugural member.

== Playing career ==
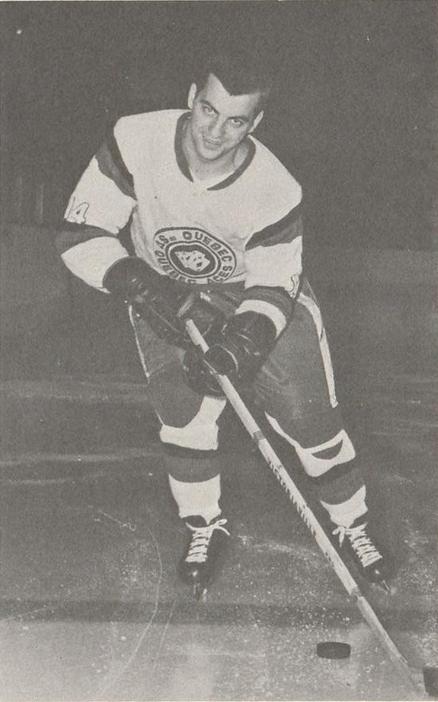
Lacroix with the Quebec Aces, c. 1966

Lacroix was born on June 5, 1945, into a "big Catholic family", with one of his brothers serving as a priest. A centre notable for his playmaking, penalty-killing, and faceoff skill, Lacroix played junior hockey for the Peterborough Petes, leading the league in assists in both the 1964–65 and 1965–66 seasons and in points the latter season. He then played two seasons for the minor-league Quebec Aces of the AHL, playing brilliantly in the 1968 season before being recalled by the Philadelphia Flyers of the NHL in the spring of 1968. Paired on a forward line with fellow ex-Quebec wingers Jean-Guy Gendron and Simon Nolet, he was an immediate star, leading the Flyers in scoring in both 1969 and 1970.

After the 1971 season, Lacroix was traded to the Chicago Black Hawks and was dismayed at the change of scenery, playing poorly the next year. However, in the fall of 1972, the upstart World Hockey Association began play. He was drafted by the Quebec Nordiques but could not come to terms. Instead, he ended up with the Philadelphia Blazers. Despite the team going through much tumult and controversy, Lacroix was an immediate star for the squad, leading the WHA in points that season with a 50–74–124 mark.

However, in the offseason, the franchise was transferred to Vancouver, and Lacroix refused to move with the team. Thus, he was traded to an even shakier team, the New York Golden Blades for the 1974 season. Again, despite payrolls being missed, ownership folding, and the league moving the team to New Jersey on November 21, as the Jersey Knights, he was a standout, leading the WHA in assists with 80. That fall, Lacroix was named to Team Canada for the 1974 Summit Series against the Soviet Union, scoring one goal and six assists for seven points in eight games to be the team's fourth-leading scorer. His lone goal was the game-winner in Canada's only win of the series, Game 2 at Maple Leaf Gardens.

The New York-New Jersey team moved yet again for the 1975 to California to become the San Diego Mariners, and Lacroix continued his success. In that first season in San Diego, he achieved two feats. From January 4 to March 19, 1975, Lacroix had a point in each game he played during that span, which was 32 consecutive games that saw him score sixteen goals and record 53 assists for a total of 69 points. He achieved his second league scoring title and racked up 106 assists, the professional record at the time and the only player other than Bobby Orr (who scored 102 assists in 1970 - 71) who had ever reached 100 assists in a single season of professional hockey. This professional record would stand until Wayne Gretzky scored 109 assists in 1980 - 81. As of 2024, only Orr, Lacroix, Wayne Gretzky, Mario Lemieux, Nikita Kucherov and Connor McDavid have accumulated 100 assists in a season. Lacroix scored over 100 points the next two seasons with the Mariners as well, before the franchise folded.

It was during this time that Lacroix began to be referred to in broadcasts of the games, as "The Magician". This was in reference to his ability to make the puck disappear, and then reappear, like a magician pulling a rabbit out of his hat. The opposing goalie would lose track of the puck, only to have it reappear in his net.

He continued to star in two more seasons before the end of the WHA, for the Houston Aeros in 1978 and the New England Whalers in 1979. His skills diminishing at last, Lacroix played briefly for the Whalers after their move to the NHL in the 1979–80 season. In 29 games, he had three goals and 14 assists. On December 20, 1979, he announced his retirement from the NHL.

== Retirement and death ==
Lacroix remained involved with hockey in retirement, creating the André Lacroix Power Hockey Academy, and he was the Director of hockey programs at the Oakland Ice Centre until 2005. He also coached youth hockey in Cleveland. Lacroix provided color commentary for the official Hartford Whalers radio broadcasts for several seasons.

He later owned and operated The Pond ice rink in Bainbridge/Auburn Township, Ohio. The Pond is notable for deriving part of its electrical power from wind turbines located at the rink. An arena in Lévis in eastern Quebec was dedicated in Lacroix's honor and received renovations in 2026.

On May 28, 2014, Lacroix was named the head coach of the University School varsity hockey team.

Despite his accomplishments, Lacroix has not been inducted into the Hockey Hall of Fame, a fact he reflected on in 2020 when asked about his new book: "Here's the problem I have with the Hockey Hall of Fame. ... They put people from Russia in the Hockey Hall of Fame that never played the game in the United States or Canada, and they don't want anybody that played in the WHA. That doesn't make sense to me. I'm not the type that would go sell myself on that, to be honest with you. I could sell a book. With the Flyers, I led the team in scoring. Then, I'm only one of four players that ever had 100 assists in one season—Bobby Orr, Gretzky, Lemieux and I. Then I'm the all-time leading scorer in the WHA. So, my point is, how can they put someone like Tretiak, from Russia, in the Hockey Hall of Fame, and they don't even think about someone like me that has accomplished a lot in hockey?" He also stated his belief that the "only reason" that Marc Tardif and J. C. Tremblay have not been inducted into the Hall is because of them playing in the WHA.

In 2020, he self-published his autobiography, After the Second Snowfall: My Life On and Off the Ice.

Lacroix died at his home in Chagrin Falls, Ohio on October 27 2026, at the age of 81.

Longtime friend and teammate Serge Bernier said the following upon his death:

André has always been a discreet guy. We didn't hear him too much. He was a gentleman, a guy who was very popular with his teammates as an individual. As a player, he was excellent. He really loved hockey. He played when hockey was a lot tougher physically. Just about everywhere he played, he was the best center on his team. Opponents often tried with him, but he did well. He was an extraordinary scorer and passer. Of course, he never received all the respect he deserved. Even though he dominated our league, he produced stars like Bobby Hull and Gordie Howe in the shadows. He's a guy I've always liked. It saddens me a lot and we've been losing for a few years. We're all going to go through it.

== Career records and achievements ==
- 79 goals and 119 assists for 198 points in 325 games in the NHL.
- 251 goals and 547 assists for 798 points in 551 games in the WHA.
- Named to the WHA's First Team All-Star Team in 1973, 1974 and 1975.
- Won the Bill Hunter Trophy as the WHA's leading scorer in 1973 and 1975.
- Scored one hundred points or more in six consecutive seasons, a mark achieved by six other major professional players.
- The WHA's all-time leader in games played, assists (by nearly two hundred) and points (by over a hundred).
- Fourth all-time in WHA history in goals scored.

== Awards ==
Red Tilson Trophy

- In 1965 and 1966 with the Peterborough Petes (OHL)

Eddie Powers Memorial Trophy (MVP):

- In 1966 with the Peterborough Petes (OHL)

W.D. (Bill) Hunter Trophy:

- In 1973 with the Philadelphia Blazers (WHA)
- In 1975 with the San Diego Mariners (WHA)

In 2010, he was elected as an inaugural inductee into the World Hockey Association Hall of Fame.

== Career statistics ==
=== Regular season and playoffs ===
			Regular season					Playoffs
Season	Team	League	GP	G	A	Pts	PIM	GP	G	A	Pts	PIM
1961–62	Quebec Citadelles	QJHL	—	—	—	—	—	3	0	0	0	16
1961–62	Quebec Citadelles	M-Cup	—	—	—	—	—	2	0	0	0	4
1962–63	Quebec Citadelles	QJHL	50	45	50	95	—	12	10	13	23	8
1963–64	Montreal Junior Canadiens	OHA-Jr.	34	12	18	30	13	17	8	13	21	8
1964–65	Peterborough Petes	OHA-Jr.	49	45	74	119	24	12	8	12	20	4
1964–65	Quebec Aces	AHL	1	0	0	0	0	—	—	—	—	—
1965–66	Peterborough Petes	OHA-Jr.	48	40	80	120	20	6	4	8	12	6
1965–66	Quebec Aces	AHL	2	1	3	4	0	—	—	—	—	—
1966–67	Quebec Aces	AHL	67	25	24	49	14	5	3	2	5	2
1967–68	Philadelphia Flyers	NHL	18	6	8	14	6	7	2	3	5	0
1967–68	Quebec Aces	AHL	54	41	46	87	18	—	—	—	—	—
1968–69	Philadelphia Flyers	NHL	75	24	32	56	4	4	0	0	0	0
1969–70	Philadelphia Flyers	NHL	74	22	36	58	14	—	—	—	—	—
1970–71	Philadelphia Flyers	NHL	78	20	22	42	12	4	0	2	2	0
1971–72	Chicago Black Hawks	NHL	51	4	7	11	6	1	0	0	0	0
1972–73	Philadelphia Blazers	WHA	78	50	74	124	83	4	0	2	2	18
1973–74	New York Golden Blades/Jersey Knights	WHA	71	31	80	111	54	—	—	—	—	—
1974–75	San Diego Mariners	WHA	78	41	106	147	63	10	3	9	12	2
1975–76	San Diego Mariners	WHA	80	29	72	101	42	11	4	6	10	4
1976–77	San Diego Mariners	WHA	81	32	82	114	79	7	1	6	7	6
1977–78	Houston Aeros	WHA	78	36	77	113	57	6	2	2	4	0
1978–79	New England Whalers	WHA	78	32	56	88	34	10	4	4	8	0
1979–80	Hartford Whalers	NHL	29	3	14	17	2	—	—	—	—	—
NHL totals			325	79	119	198	44	16	2	5	7	0
WHA totals			551	251	547	798	412	48	14	29	43	30

=== International ===
Year	Team	Event	GP	G	A	Pts	PIM
1974	Canada	SS	8	1	6	7	6

== See also ==
- List of WHA players with 100-point seasons
