= San Diego Hawks =

Ice Hockey Team

The San Diego Hawks (known initially as the San Diego Mariners) were a minor professional ice hockey team based in San Diego, California, that competed in the Pacific Hockey League (PHL). The team played its home games at the San Diego Sports Arena. The Hawks competed in both of the PHL's two seasons before the league folded, playing from 1977 to 1979.

The team competed as the Mariners for its first season before being rebranded as the Hawks for its second season, following a change in ownership. The team's original name was adopted from a previous, unrelated hockey team, the San Diego Mariners of the World Hockey Association (WHA), who had folded earlier in 1979.
