= New York Golden Blades =

Former ice hockey team of the World Hockey Association

Raiders/Golden Blades/Knights
- League: WHA
- Operated: 1972–1974

Franchise history
- 1972–1973: New York Raiders
- 1973–1974: New York Golden Blades/ Jersey Knights
- 1974–1977: San Diego Mariners

The New York Raiders were a professional ice hockey team in New York City. They competed in the World Hockey Association (WHA) as a member of the Eastern Division (1972–1974). They played at Madison Square Garden in New York from 1972 to 1973 and Cherry Hill Arena in New Jersey from 1973 to 1974. The organization was established in 1971 as a charter franchise of the World Hockey Association (WHA).

Intended to be the WHA's flagship franchise, the team was unable to compete with the National Hockey League's established New York Rangers, and expansion New York Islanders. During its inaugural season, the WHA had to take over ownership of the team. A third owner took over and renamed the franchise the New York Golden Blades to start the second season, but remained in financial distress and moved to the Philadelphia metropolitan area township of Cherry Hill, New Jersey, on November 21, 1973, becoming the Jersey Knights, its third name and second home, in less than two full seasons of operation.

== New York Raiders ==
New York Raiders
- City: New York City, New York
- Home arena: Madison Square Garden
- Head coach: Camille Henry
- Media: WMCA

Coached by Camille Henry, the New York Raiders had the second overall pick in the first WHA Draft in 1972, selecting Al Sims, who signed with the Boston Bruins instead.

The team was initially slated to play in the brand-new Nassau Veterans Memorial Coliseum on Long Island. However, Nassau County officials did not consider the WHA to be a major league, and wanted nothing to do with the Raiders. County officials retained William Shea, who had spearheaded the effort to return National League baseball to New York, to get an NHL team to play in the new building.

The next step was to convince Madison Square Garden, owner of the New York Rangers, to allow another NHL team to share the New York area. Rangers president Bill Jennings was skeptical at first. However, Shea and NHL president Clarence Campbell convinced Jennings that the Rangers would at least get compensation from another New York NHL team. On the other hand, the Garden would not see a penny from a New York WHA team unless it was included in a potential NHL–WHA merger. Jennings relented, and the NHL granted an expansion franchise to Long Island, the New York Islanders. The terms of the Islanders' lease with Nassau County effectively locked non-NHL teams out of the Coliseum.

The Raiders were thus forced to play at the Garden as tenants of the Rangers; no other arena in the metropolitan area was suitable even for temporary use. The situation rapidly became untenable, with an onerous lease and low attendance. During the season the Raiders averaged 5,868 spectators per game, which was far less than the NHL's Rangers (17,494) and the Islanders (11,996). The three original owners defaulted, and the league ended up taking control of the team midway through the season.

== New York Golden Blades/Jersey Knights ==
New York Golden Blades
- City: New York City, New York
- Home arena: Madison Square Garden
- Media: WRVR

Jersey Knights
- City: Cherry Hill, New Jersey
- Home arena: Cherry Hill Arena

Following the season, New York real estate mogul Ralph Brent bought the team and renamed it the New York Golden Blades. While they managed to acquire Andre Lacroix from the Philadelphia Blazers, he was essentially all the franchise had going for it. The team replaced their original orange and blue uniforms with purple and gold uniforms, and to coincide with the new identity, the team started the season wearing white skates with gold-colored blades.

The situation improved very little from the previous season; at times, the Golden Blades played before crowds of only 500 people (in an 18,000-seat arena). Sinking in debt, Brent returned the team to the league in late November, just twenty games into the season, with a 6–12–2 record. Veteran player Harry Howell, who had been recently picked up by the Golden Blades after being released from the Los Angeles Kings, was elevated to player-coach, and ordered the team's white skates painted black.

After financial losses were incurred playing home games at Madison Square Garden, the WHA moved the team to Cherry Hill, New Jersey, and renamed it the Jersey Knights. The move marked a return of sorts to the Philadelphia metropolitan area for the WHA, which had seen the Blazers move to Vancouver after only one season. WHA trustee Howard Baldwin was quoted as saying "Hopefully, we will be back in New York next season with a strong owner to compete in that market." Despite this, the WHA would never return to New York, getting no closer than the New England Whalers in 1975, when that team moved from Boston to Hartford, Connecticut. Having been locked out of Madison Square Garden just prior to their move, the players were unable to take their Blades jerseys with them. The team reverted to the previous Raiders uniforms, with the original crest replaced with the new Knights logo.

The newly minted Knights soon discovered their new home, Cherry Hill Arena, had a slope in the ice surface, which forced visiting teams to skate uphill two out of three periods. One drawback was that pucks would sometimes shoot upwards unexpectedly; one Knight was knocked cold when a would-be pass jumped up and nailed him between the eyes. Years later Ab McDonald said, "[The ice] was so high in the middle, the short guys almost couldn’t see the other end of the ice." The arena in Cherry Hill was available because the previous pro hockey tenant, the Jersey Devils, had folded when the Eastern Hockey League went out of business at the end of the previous season.

The arena was also closely cramped, with players not having adequate changing and dressing facilities; visiting teams had to dress at their hotel. In addition, there was no plexiglass around the playing surface. The boards in the area from face-off circle to face-off circle at each end of the ice was bordered with chicken-wire as protection. The rest of the arena had no protection above the boards.

Rod Philips, the radio voice of the Edmonton Oilers for 37 years, ending in 2011, is quoted as saying of the arena, "The press box in Cherry Hill, N.J. (across the bridge from Philadelphia) was so small that you couldn't stand up. The roof was only four feet high and you were all hunched over. When somebody shut the door, they cut off one whole end of the rink."

Despite the questionable facilities, the Knights played over-.500 hockey and were in playoff contention before losing their last six games to finish 32–42–4, last in the Eastern Division. Within five weeks of the move, though, reports had already begun to state that the franchise would not stay in New Jersey beyond the end of the season, as it was clear Cherry Hill Arena was inadequate even for temporary use. Moreover, what little local interest existed in the WHA team disappeared with the nearby Philadelphia Flyers en route to their first of two consecutive Stanley Cup championships.

Baltimore businessman Joe Schwartz purchased the team in January, fueling speculation the team might move to there, or perhaps be re-incarnated as an expansion franchise in Cincinnati or Indianapolis.

Instead, at the end of the 1974 season, Schwartz moved the Knights to San Diego, California, and renamed them the San Diego Mariners.

The last active player from the Raiders/Golden Blades/Knights was Bobby Sheehan who last played in 1981–82 NHL season and played his final professional season in the American Hockey League in 1983.

== Season-by-season record ==
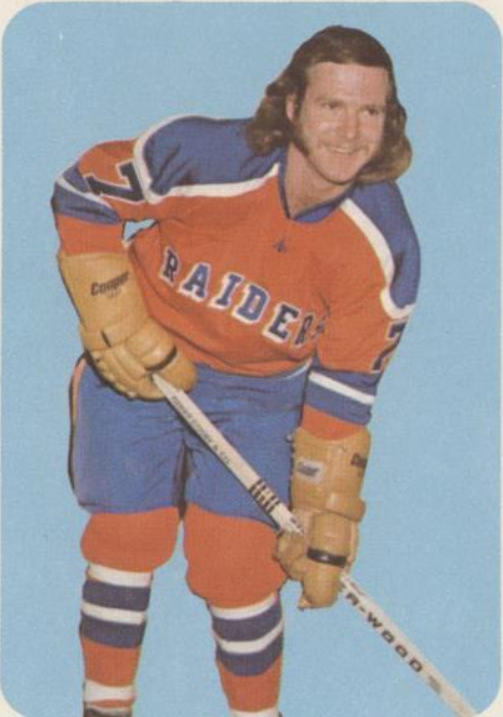
Bobby Sheehan, pictured in the home jersey of the Raiders in 1973.

Note: GP = Games played, W = Wins, L = Losses, T = Ties, Pts = Points, GF = Goals for, GA = Goals against, PIM = Penalties in minutes

Season	Team name	GP	W	L	T	Pts	GF	GA	PIM	Finish	Playoffs
1972–73	Raiders	78	33	43	2	68	303	334	900	6th, Eastern	Did not qualify
1973–74	Golden Blades/Knights	78	32	42	4	68	268	313	933	6th, Eastern	Did not qualify
Franchise totals		156	65	85	6	136	571	644	1,833
