= San Diego Mariners =

Former ice hockey team of the World Hockey Association

- City: San Diego, California
- League: World Hockey Association (1974-77)
- Operated: 1974–1977
- Home arena: San Diego Sports Arena
- Media: KCST-TV; KOGO

Franchise history
- 1972–73: New York Raiders
- 1973–74: New York Golden Blades/Jersey Knights
- 1974–77: San Diego Mariners

The San Diego Mariners were a professional ice hockey team based in San Diego, California, that competed in the World Hockey Association (WHA). The team played its home games at the San Diego Sports Arena. Previous to being in San Diego, the team was known as the New York Raiders, New York Golden Blades, and the Jersey Knights. After folding in 1977, the team name was adopted by an unrelated franchise in the low-level, minor professional Pacific Hockey League (PHL).

== Notable alumni ==
Star players for the Mariners included defenseman Harry Howell, center Andre Lacroix, and goaltender Ernie Wakely. The Mariners were coached by Howell (as player-coach) during their first season and Ron Ingram the succeeding two seasons, qualifying for the WHA playoffs each year.

== Demise ==
Late in the Mariners' second season in 1975–76, owner Joseph Schwartz defaulted on paying his players' salaries and the league's assessments, and the league took over the team. In August 1976, McDonald's and San Diego Padres owner Ray Kroc purchased the team for $450,000.

During the Mariners' final WHA season in 1976–77, the team never drew well, and when they only managed to attract 5,000 fans per game, Kroc sold the team to a group who planned to move it to Melbourne, Florida, however, they could not find a suitable arena. The team was then sold to former Philadelphia Flyers minority owner Bill Putnam, who changed the team's name to the "Florida Breakers" and announced they would play at the Hollywood Sportatorium in Hollywood, Florida, between Miami and Fort Lauderdale. After this deal fell apart Jerry Saperstein tried to buy the team and move them to the same area as the Florida Icegators. However, this deal collapsed as well, and after three attempts by three different groups to move the team to Florida all failed, the Mariners folded just before training camp opened in the fall of 1977. Fans who put down deposits for season tickets never got their money back. The last Mariners player active in major professional hockey was Kevin Devine, who played his last NHL game in the 1982-83 NHL season. Ron Plumb was the last active player who retired in 1986 after playing in England. Mariners' draft pick Don Edwards played in the NHL until 1986, but never played in the WHA.

== Team colors ==
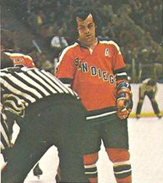
Andre Lacroix in Mariners orange jersey, c. 1975

Team colors for the Mariners were orange and blue. The uniforms were the same design as the team wore as the New York Raiders and Jersey Knights, albeit with the jersey logo replaced with San Diego spelled out diagonally across the front. The color scheme was the same as it was for the San Diego Gulls of the old Western Hockey League. The color scheme was later adopted in the form of throwback jerseys for the now-defunct WCHL/ECHL San Diego Gulls.

== Season-by-season record ==
Note: GP = Games played, W = Wins, L = Losses, T = Ties, Pts = Points, GF = Goals for, GA = Goals against, PIM = Penalties in minutes

Season	GP	W	L	T	Pts	GF	GA	PIM	Finish	Playoffs
1974–75	78	43	31	4	90	326	268	1058	2nd, Western	Won quarterfinals (Toros); Lost semifinals (Aeros)
1975–76	80	36	38	6	78	303	290	716	3rd, Western	Won preliminaries (Roadrunners); Lost quarterfinals (Aeros)
1976–77	81	40	37	4	84	284	283	834	3rd, Western	Lost quarterfinals (Jets)
Totals	239	119	106	14	252	913	841	2608

== Name reused in new league ==
After the WHA Mariners folded, San Diego Sports Arena operator Peter Graham joined the idea for a new low-level minor professional hockey league on the West Coast, the Pacific Hockey League (PHL). Graham used the name of the defunct WHA team, founding an unrelated San Diego Mariners in the PHL in 1977. Those Mariners were sold in 1978 to Pittsburgh businessman Elmer Jonnet, and played in the PHL's second and final season as the "San Diego Hawks".

== See also ==
- List of San Diego Mariners (WHA) players
