= 1974–75 Michigan Stags/Baltimore Blades season =

Season in World Hockey Association

1974–75 Michigan Stags/Baltimore Blades
- Division: 5th West
- 1974–75 record: 21–53–4
- Home record: 15–21–3
- Road record: 6–32–1
- Goals for: 205
- Goals against: 341

Team information
- Coach: Johnny Wilson
- Captain: Larry Johnston (until mid-February); John Miszuk
- Alternate captains: Gary Veneruzzo; Paul Curtis; J.P. LeBlanc
- Arena: Cobo Arena (Oct.–Jan.); Baltimore Civic Center (Jan.–Apr.)

Team leaders
- Goals: Gary Veneruzzo (33)
- Assists: J.P. LeBlanc (33)
- Points: Gary Veneruzzo (60)
- Penalty minutes: J.P. LeBlanc (100)
- Wins: Gerry Desjardins; Paul Hoganson (9)
- Goals against average: Paul Hoganson (4.09)

The 1974–75 Michigan Stags/Baltimore Blades season was the third season of the former Los Angeles Sharks franchise. Prior to the season, the team relocated to Detroit, and then relocated to Baltimore partway through the season. The team finished fifth in the Western Division and did not qualify for the playoffs.

== Regular season ==
=== Final standings ===
Western Division	GP	W	L	T	Pts	GF	GA	PIM
Houston Aeros	78	53	25	0	106	369	247	1257
San Diego Mariners	78	43	31	4	90	326	268	1058
Minnesota Fighting Saints	78	42	33	3	87	308	279	1233
Phoenix Roadrunners	78	39	31	8	86	300	265	1388
Michigan Stags / Baltimore Blades	78	21	53	4	46	205	341	1104

== Schedule and results ==
=== Michigan Stags ===
1974–75 regular season
October

Game	Result	Date	Score	Opponent	Record
1	W	October 17, 1974	4–2	@ Indianapolis Racers (1974–75)	1–0–0
2	L	October 19, 1974	1–2 OT	@ New England Whalers (1974–75)	1–1–0
3	L	October 20, 1974	3–4	@ Toronto Toros (1974–75)	1–2–0
4	L	October 23, 1974	2–6	@ Quebec Nordiques (1974–75)	1–3–0
5	L	October 27, 1974	2–5	@ Winnipeg Jets (1974–75)	1–4–0
6	W	October 29, 1974	4–3 OT	Minnesota Fighting Saints (1974–75)	2–4–0
7	L	October 31, 1974	2–4	Cleveland Crusaders (1974–75)	2–5–0

November

Game	Result	Date	Score	Opponent	Record
8	L	November 2, 1974	3–6	@ Minnesota Fighting Saints (1974–75)	2–6–0
9	L	November 3, 1974	3–11	@ Winnipeg Jets (1974–75)	2–7–0
10	L	November 5, 1974	2–5	Toronto Toros (1974–75)	2–8–0
11	L	November 10, 1974	1–6	Indianapolis Racers (1974–75)	2–9–0
12	L	November 12, 1974	4–5	Quebec Nordiques (1974–75)	2–10–0
13	W	November 14, 1974	4–2	Chicago Cougars (1974–75)	3–10–0
14	L	November 16, 1974	3–4	@ Quebec Nordiques (1974–75)	3–11–0
15	L	November 17, 1974	1–6	New England Whalers (1974–75)	3–12–0
16	W	November 21, 1974	2–1	Phoenix Roadrunners (1974–75)	4–12–0
17	L	November 22, 1974	3–5	@ Chicago Cougars (1974–75)	4–13–0
18	W	November 24, 1974	3–2	Minnesota Fighting Saints (1974–75)	5–13–0
19	L	November 26, 1974	1–5	Vancouver Blazers (1974–75)	5–14–0
20	L	November 29, 1974	6–7	@ Winnipeg Jets (1974–75)	5–15–0

December

Game	Result	Date	Score	Opponent	Record
21	W	December 3, 1974	2–1	New England Whalers (1974–75)	6–15–0
22	W	December 5, 1974	5–3	San Diego Mariners (1974–75)	7–15–0
23	L	December 7, 1974	2–4	@ Vancouver Blazers (1974–75)	7–16–0
24	L	December 8, 1974	0–7	@ Edmonton Oilers (1974–75)	7–17–0
25	T	December 10, 1974	4–4	@ San Diego Mariners (1974–75)	7–17–1
26	W	December 12, 1974	5–3	Winnipeg Jets (1974–75)	8–17–1
27	L	December 14, 1974	0–6	@ Chicago Cougars (1974–75)	8–18–1
28	L	December 15, 1974	2–7	Toronto Toros (1974–75)	8–19–1
29	T	December 17, 1974	2–2	New England Whalers (1974–75)	8–19–2
30	W	December 19, 1974	1–0	Cleveland Crusaders (1974–75)	9–19–2
31	L	December 20, 1974	2–7	@ Phoenix Roadrunners (1974–75)	9–20–2
32	W	December 22, 1974	3–2 OT	Quebec Nordiques (1974–75)	10–20–2
33	L	December 26, 1974	1–8	@ Vancouver Blazers (1974–75)	10–21–2
34	L	December 28, 1974	1–4	@ Quebec Nordiques (1974–75)	10–22–2
35	W	December 29, 1974	4–3	Chicago Cougars (1974–75)	11–22–2
36	T	December 31, 1974	1–1	Phoenix Roadrunners (1974–75)	11–22–3

January

Game	Result	Date	Score	Opponent	Record
37	L	January 2, 1975	3–6	@ Houston Aeros (1974–75)	11–23–3
38	L	January 4, 1975	2–5	@ Houston Aeros (1974–75)	11–24–3
39	W	January 5, 1975	3–1	Vancouver Blazers (1974–75)	12–24–3
40	L	January 7, 1975	2–3 OT	Quebec Nordiques (1974–75)	12–25–3
41	W	January 9, 1975	5–4 OT	Winnipeg Jets (1974–75)	13–25–3
42	L	January 10, 1975	2–5	@ Chicago Cougars (1974–75)	13–26–3
43	L	January 18, 1975	1–2	@ Cleveland Crusaders (1974–75)	13–27–3

Legend: Win (2 points) Loss (0 points) Tie (1 point)

=== Baltimore Blades ===
1974–75 regular season
January

Game	Result	Date	Score	Opponent	Record
44	L	January 25, 1975	1–2	@ Cleveland Crusaders (1974–75)	13–28–3
45	L	January 26, 1975	1–2	@ Minnesota Fighting Saints (1974–75)	13–29–3
46	L	January 29, 1975	3–4	@ New England Whalers (1974–75)	13–30–3
47	L	January 31, 1975	2–4	@ New England Whalers (1974–75)	13–31–3

February

Game	Result	Date	Score	Opponent	Record
48	L	February 1, 1975	1–8	@ Phoenix Roadrunners (1974–75)	13–32–3
49	L	February 2, 1975	2–5	Houston Aeros (1974–75)	13–33–3
50	L	February 4, 1975	0–1 OT	Edmonton Oilers (1974–75)	13–34–3
51	L	February 6, 1975	0–4	Cleveland Crusaders (1974–75)	13–35–3
52	W	February 8, 1975	6–4	@ Houston Aeros (1974–75)	14–35–3
53	L	February 11, 1975	2–5	Houston Aeros (1974–75)	14–36–3
54	L	February 13, 1975	1–6	San Diego Mariners (1974–75)	14–37–3
55	L	February 15, 1975	3–5	Chicago Cougars (1974–75)	14–38–3
56	L	February 18, 1975	3–5	Winnipeg Jets (1974–75)	14–39–3
57	W	February 20, 1975	4–3	Vancouver Blazers (1974–75)	15–39–3
58	L	February 22, 1975	1–3	Phoenix Roadrunners (1974–75)	15–40–3
59	L	February 25, 1975	4–6	Indianapolis Racers (1974–75)	15–41–3
60	L	February 28, 1975	2–6	@ Edmonton Oilers (1974–75)	15–42–3

March

Game	Result	Date	Score	Opponent	Record
61	L	March 2, 1975	2–7	@ Edmonton Oilers (1974–75)	15–43–3
62	L	March 4, 1975	4–6	@ Toronto Toros (1974–75)	15–44–3
63	L	March 5, 1975	2–5	Indianapolis Racers (1974–75)	15–45–3
64	W	March 7, 1975	5–4 OT	@ Indianapolis Racers (1974–75)	16–45–3
65	L	March 8, 1975	4–7	Toronto Toros (1974–75)	16–46–3
66	L	March 9, 1975	2–8	@ Toronto Toros (1974–75)	16–47–3
67	W	March 10, 1975	5–3	Edmonton Oilers (1974–75)	17–47–3
68	W	March 12, 1975	2–0	@ Cleveland Crusaders (1974–75)	18–47–3
69	L	March 15, 1975	3–7	@ Indianapolis Racers (1974–75)	18–48–3
70	L	March 25, 1975	4–5	@ Minnesota Fighting Saints (1974–75)	18–49–3
71	L	March 26, 1975	2–5	San Diego Mariners (1974–75)	18–50–3
72	T	March 27, 1975	2–2	Edmonton Oilers (1974–75)	18–50–4
73	L	March 30, 1975	3–4	@ Vancouver Blazers (1974–75)	18–51–4

April

Game	Result	Date	Score	Opponent	Record
74	W	April 1, 1975	4–3	@ San Diego Mariners (1974–75)	19–51–4
75	L	April 3, 1975	2–9	@ San Diego Mariners (1974–75)	19–52–4
76	W	April 5, 1975	7–6 OT	@ Phoenix Roadrunners (1974–75)	20–52–4
77	L	April 6, 1975	5–6 OT	Minnesota Fighting Saints (1974–75)	20–53–4
78	W	April 7, 1975	4–2	Houston Aeros (1974–75)	21–53–4

Legend: Win (2 points) Loss (0 points) Tie (1 point)

== Player statistics ==
Regular season
Scoring

Player	Pos	GP	G	A	Pts	PIM	+/-	PPG	SHG	GWG
Gary Veneruzzo	W	77	33	27	60	57	-45	9	0	0
J.P. LeBlanc	C	78	16	33	49	100	-52	3	3	0
Gary Bredin	RW	67	15	21	36	29	-37	1	0	0
Steve West	C	50	15	18	33	4	-5	5	0	0
Tom Serviss	C	60	12	17	29	18	-35	2	0	0
Danny Gruen	LW	34	10	16	26	73	-12	3	0	0
Steve Richardson	LW	47	8	18	26	58	-16	0	0	0
Bill Evo	RW	49	13	9	22	32	-25	0	0	0
Alton White	RW	27	9	12	21	8	-15	4	0	0
Reg Thomas	LW	50	8	13	21	42	-23	2	0	0
Barry Legge	D	36	3	18	21	20	-19	3	0	0
John Miszuk	D	66	2	19	21	56	-29	0	0	0
Paul Curtis	D	76	4	15	19	32	-63	1	0	0
Marc Tardif	LW	23	12	5	17	9	-1	2	0	0
Randy Legge	D	78	1	14	15	69	-40	0	0	0
Alain Caron	RW	47	8	5	13	4	-15	5	0	0
Fred Speck	C	30	4	8	12	18	0	0	0	0
Jerry Zrymiak	D	48	3	9	12	53	-23	0	0	0
Steve Andrascik	RW	57	4	7	11	42	-18	0	0	0
Pierre Guite	LW	13	5	4	9	11	0	0	0	0
Guy Trottier	RW	17	5	4	9	2	0	0	0	0
Len Fontaine	RW	21	1	8	9	6	0	0	0	0
Larry Johnston	D	49	0	9	9	93	0	0	0	0
Eddie Johnstone	RW	23	4	4	8	43	0	0	0	0
Brian McDonald	C	18	3	5	8	15	-11	2	0	0
Arnie Brown	D	50	3	4	7	27	-32	1	0	0
Steve Sutherland	LW	22	1	5	6	37	-10	0	0	0
Jacques Locas	C	12	1	4	5	4	0	0	0	0
Michel Rouleau	C	7	0	3	3	25	0	0	0	0
Paul Larose	RW	5	1	1	2	2	-2	0	0	0
Gary Sittler	D	5	1	1	2	14	0	0	0	0
Craig Reichmuth	LW	16	0	2	2	23	0	0	0	0
Gerry Desjardins	G	41	0	1	1	13	0	0	0	0
Bob Jones	LW	5	0	1	1	8	0	0	0	0
Claude Chartre	C	1	0	0	0	0	0	0	0	0
Bill Goldthorpe	LW	7	0	0	0	26	0	0	0	0
Paul Hoganson	G	32	0	0	0	12	0	0	0	0
Jim McLeod	G	16	0	0	0	0	0	0	0	0
Bill Reed	D	11	0	0	0	12	0	0	0	0

Goaltending

Player	MIN	GP	W	L	T	GA	GAA	SO
Gerry Desjardins	2282	41	9	28	1	162	4.26	0
Paul Hoganson	1776	32	9	19	2	121	4.09	2
Jim McLeod	694	16	3	6	1	53	4.58	0
Team:	4752	78	21	53	4	336	4.24	2

Note: Pos = Position; GP = Games played; G = Goals; A = Assists; Pts = Points; +/- = plus/minus; PIM = Penalty minutes; PPG = Power-play goals; SHG = Short-handed goals; GWG = Game-winning goals
MIN = Minutes played; W = Wins; L = Losses; T = Ties; GA = Goals-against; GAA = Goals-against average; SO = Shutouts;

== Draft picks ==
Michigan's draft picks at the 1974 WHA Amateur Draft.

Round	#	Player	Nationality	College/Junior/Club team (League)
1	4	Bill Reed (D)	Canada	Sault Ste. Marie Greyhounds (OHA)
2	19	Rick Blight (RW)	Canada	Brandon Wheat Kings (WCHL)
3	34	Barry Legge (D)	Canada	Winnipeg Clubs (WCHL)
3	40	Paul Nicholson (LW)	Canada	London Knights (OHA)
5	63	Larry Finck (D)	Canada	St. Catharines Black Hawks (OHA)
6	78	Ed Johnstone (RW)	Canada	Medicine Hat Tigers (WCHL)
7	93	Ron Pronchuk (D)	Canada	Brandon Wheat Kings (WCHL)
8	108	Paul Touzin (G)	Canada	Shawinigan Dynamos (QMJHL)
9	123	Terry Casey (RW)	Canada	St. Catharines Black Hawks (OHA)
11	151	Dave Groulx (F)	Canada	Cornell University (ECAC)
12	164	John Riley (D)	Canada	Windsor Spitfires (SOJHL)

== See also ==
- 1974–75 WHA season
