= 1974–75 Indianapolis Racers season =

World Hockey Association team season

1974–75 Indianapolis Racers
- Division: 4th Eastern
- 1974–75 record: 18–57–3
- Home record: 13–26–0
- Road record: 5–31–3
- Goals for: 216
- Goals against: 338

Team information
- Coach: Gerry Moore
- Captain: Nick Harbaruk
- Alternate captains: Bob Woytowich; Bob Sicinski; Ken Block
- Arena: Market Square Arena

Team leaders
- Goals: Bob Whitlock (31)
- Assists: Bob Sicinski (34)
- Points: Bob Whitlock (57)
- Penalty minutes: Bob Fitchner (96)
- Wins: Andy Brown (15)
- Goals against average: Andy Brown (4.15)

The 1974–75 Indianapolis Racers season was the first season of operation of the Indianapolis Racers in the World Hockey Association. The Racers finished fourth to miss the playoffs.

== Regular season ==
=== Final standings ===
Eastern Division	GP	W	L	T	Pts	GF	GA	PIM
New England Whalers	78	43	30	5	91	274	279	867
Cleveland Crusaders	78	35	40	3	73	236	258	1273
Chicago Cougars	78	30	47	1	61	261	312	1086
Indianapolis Racers	78	18	57	3	39	216	338	970

== Schedule and results ==
1974–75 regular season
October

Game	Result	Date	Score	Opponent	Record
1	L	October 17, 1974	2–4	Michigan Stags/Baltimore Blades (1974–75)	0–1–0
2	L	October 18, 1974	1–3	@ Toronto Toros (1974–75)	0–2–0
3	L	October 20, 1974	1–4	@ Quebec Nordiques (1974–75)	0–3–0
4	L	October 24, 1974	2–3	Minnesota Fighting Saints (1974–75)	0–4–0
5	L	October 26, 1974	1–6	@ New England Whalers (1974–75)	0–5–0
6	W	October 27, 1974	5–3	Quebec Nordiques (1974–75)	1–5–0
7	L	October 31, 1974	1–6	New England Whalers (1974–75)	1–6–0

November

Game	Result	Date	Score	Opponent	Record
8	L	November 3, 1974	1–3	Edmonton Oilers (1974–75)	1–7–0
9	L	November 5, 1974	0–3	Phoenix Roadrunners (1974–75)	1–8–0
10	W	November 7, 1974	3–0	San Diego Mariners (1974–75)	2–8–0
11	W	November 9, 1974	5–4 OT	@ Houston Aeros (1974–75)	3–8–0
12	W	November 10, 1974	6–1	@ Michigan Stags/Baltimore Blades (1974–75)	4–8–0
13	L	November 13, 1974	3–10	@ Quebec Nordiques (1974–75)	4–9–0
14	L	November 15, 1974	0–5	@ Winnipeg Jets (1974–75)	4–10–0
15	L	November 17, 1974	1–2	@ Edmonton Oilers (1974–75)	4–11–0
16	L	November 19, 1974	0–10	Houston Aeros (1974–75)	4–12–0
17	L	November 20, 1974	4–6	@ Chicago Cougars (1974–75)	4–13–0
18	L	November 21, 1974	0–4	New England Whalers (1974–75)	4–14–0
19	L	November 24, 1974	2–9	Toronto Toros (1974–75)	4–15–0
20	L	November 26, 1974	0–4	Winnipeg Jets (1974–75)	4–16–0
21	L	November 28, 1974	5–7	Quebec Nordiques (1974–75)	4–17–0
22	L	November 29, 1974	2–4	@ Cleveland Crusaders (1974–75)	4–18–0

December

Game	Result	Date	Score	Opponent	Record
23	L	December 1, 1974	3–7	Houston Aeros (1974–75)	4–19–0
24	L	December 5, 1974	3–5	Chicago Cougars (1974–75)	4–20–0
25	L	December 7, 1974	3–6	@ New England Whalers (1974–75)	4–21–0
26	W	December 8, 1974	5–3	San Diego Mariners (1974–75)	5–21–0
27	L	December 10, 1974	3–5	Winnipeg Jets (1974–75)	5–22–0
28	L	December 14, 1974	0–2	@ San Diego Mariners (1974–75)	5–23–0
29	L	December 15, 1974	1–3	Edmonton Oilers (1974–75)	5–24–0
30	L	December 17, 1974	2–3	Vancouver Blazers (1974–75)	5–25–0
31	L	December 19, 1974	0–6	Minnesota Fighting Saints (1974–75)	5–26–0
32	L	December 20, 1974	4–6	@ Minnesota Fighting Saints (1974–75)	5–27–0
33	W	December 22, 1974	2–1	New England Whalers (1974–75)	6–27–0
34	T	December 27, 1974	1–1	@ Vancouver Blazers (1974–75)	6–27–1
35	L	December 29, 1974	4–5 OT	@ Edmonton Oilers (1974–75)	6–28–1

January

Game	Result	Date	Score	Opponent	Record
36	L	January 1, 1975	3–6	@ Quebec Nordiques (1974–75)	6–29–1
37	L	January 2, 1975	1–4	@ Cleveland Crusaders (1974–75)	6–30–1
38	T	January 4, 1975	4–4	@ Chicago Cougars (1974–75)	6–30–2
39	L	January 5, 1975	1–2	Phoenix Roadrunners (1974–75)	6–31–2
40	W	January 7, 1975	4–2	Vancouver Blazers (1974–75)	7–31–2
41	T	January 10, 1975	3–3	@ Edmonton Oilers (1974–75)	7–31–3
42	W	January 16, 1975	4–2	Cleveland Crusaders (1974–75)	8–31–3
43	L	January 19, 1975	1–5	@ Vancouver Blazers (1974–75)	8–32–3
44	W	January 22, 1975	3–1	@ Winnipeg Jets (1974–75)	9–32–3
45	W	January 23, 1975	4–2	Chicago Cougars (1974–75)	10–32–3
46	L	January 26, 1975	0–6	@ Phoenix Roadrunners (1974–75)	10–33–3
47	L	January 28, 1975	1–3	Phoenix Roadrunners (1974–75)	10–34–3
48	L	January 30, 1975	2–3	Toronto Toros (1974–75)	10–35–3

February

Game	Result	Date	Score	Opponent	Record
49	L	February 1, 1975	1–2	Quebec Nordiques (1974–75)	10–36–3
50	L	February 4, 1975	3–4 OT	Houston Aeros (1974–75)	10–37–3
51	L	February 9, 1975	5–7	@ Toronto Toros (1974–75)	10–38–3
52	W	February 10, 1975	4–1	Chicago Cougars (1974–75)	11–38–3
53	L	February 14, 1975	3–4 OT	@ New England Whalers (1974–75)	11–39–3
54	L	February 17, 1975	5–6 OT	@ Chicago Cougars (1974–75)	11–40–3
55	L	February 18, 1975	2–9	Vancouver Blazers (1974–75)	11–41–3
56	W	February 21, 1975	5–2	Minnesota Fighting Saints (1974–75)	12–41–3
57	W	February 23, 1975	6–0	Cleveland Crusaders (1974–75)	13–41–3
58	W	February 25, 1975	6–4	@ Michigan Stags/Baltimore Blades (1974–75)	14–41–3
59	L	February 26, 1975	3–4 OT	@ Minnesota Fighting Saints (1974–75)	14–42–3

March

Game	Result	Date	Score	Opponent	Record
60	L	March 1, 1975	2–12	@ Phoenix Roadrunners (1974–75)	14–43–3
61	L	March 2, 1975	3–4 OT	@ Houston Aeros (1974–75)	14–44–3
62	W	March 5, 1975	5–2	@ Michigan Stags/Baltimore Blades (1974–75)	15–44–3
63	L	March 7, 1975	4–5 OT	Michigan Stags/Baltimore Blades (1974–75)	15–45–3
64	L	March 8, 1975	5–6	Cleveland Crusaders (1974–75)	15–46–3
65	W	March 13, 1975	5–4	Toronto Toros (1974–75)	16–46–3
66	W	March 15, 1975	7–3	Michigan Stags/Baltimore Blades (1974–75)	17–46–3
67	L	March 19, 1975	5–6	@ Houston Aeros (1974–75)	17–47–3
68	W	March 20, 1975	3–1	Edmonton Oilers (1974–75)	18–47–3
69	L	March 22, 1975	3–6	@ San Diego Mariners (1974–75)	18–48–3
70	L	March 23, 1975	3–5	@ Phoenix Roadrunners (1974–75)	18–49–3
71	L	March 25, 1975	3–4 OT	Winnipeg Jets (1974–75)	18–50–3
72	L	March 27, 1975	2–5	San Diego Mariners (1974–75)	18–51–3
73	L	March 29, 1975	5–7	@ Cleveland Crusaders (1974–75)	18–52–3
74	L	March 30, 1975	3–5	@ Minnesota Fighting Saints (1974–75)	18–53–3
75	L	March 31, 1975	1–4	@ Winnipeg Jets (1974–75)	18–54–3

April

Game	Result	Date	Score	Opponent	Record
76	L	April 1, 1975	1–7	@ Toronto Toros (1974–75)	18–55–3
77	L	April 5, 1975	3–8	@ San Diego Mariners (1974–75)	18–56–3
78	L	April 6, 1975	3–4	@ Vancouver Blazers (1974–75)	18–57–3

Legend: Win (2 points) Loss (0 points) Tie (1 point)

== Player statistics ==
Regular season
Scoring

Player	Pos	GP	G	A	Pts	PIM	+/-	PPG	SHG	GWG
Bob Whitlock	C	73	31	26	57	56	-27	5	0	0
Bob Sicinski	C	77	19	34	53	12	-32	4	2	0
Nick Harbaruk	RW	78	20	23	43	52	-22	3	1	0
Jim Wiste	C	75	13	28	41	30	-19	0	0	0
Kerry Bond	LW	71	22	15	37	23	-30	5	0	0
Ron Buchanan	C	32	16	15	31	16	-12	9	0	0
Bob Fitchner	C	78	11	19	30	96	-26	2	0	0
Brian McDonald	C	47	14	15	29	19	-10	2	0	0
Dick Proceviat	D	52	1	28	29	51	-13	0	0	0
John Sheridan	C	58	17	11	28	20	-15	3	0	0
Murray Heatley	RW	29	15	8	23	25	-7	5	0	0
Jim Johnson	C	42	7	15	22	12	-15	2	0	0
Joe Hardy	C	32	2	17	19	36	0	0	0	0
Ken Block	D	37	0	17	17	18	-10	0	0	0
Bob Ash	D	64	1	14	15	19	-30	1	0	0
Rich Pumple	LW	34	4	8	12	29	-12	0	0	0
Bill Horton	D	59	2	9	11	30	-28	0	0	0
Ralph Hopiavuori	D	28	2	8	10	21	-17	1	0	0
Joe Robertson	C	18	4	4	8	23	-6	0	0	0
Ken Desjardine	D	46	0	8	8	68	-24	0	0	0
Bob Woytowich	D	42	0	8	8	28	-26	0	0	0
Jim Hargreaves	D	37	2	5	7	30	-19	0	0	0
Ross Smith	LW	15	1	6	7	19	0	0	0	0
Steve Andrascik	RW	20	2	4	6	16	0	0	0	0
Roger Cote	D	36	0	6	6	24	-9	0	0	0
Gary Bredin	RW	10	3	2	5	8	-3	0	0	0
Gord Kannegiesser	D	4	1	4	5	4	4	0	0	0
Steve Richardson	LW	19	1	4	5	16	-2	0	0	0
Murray Kennett	D	28	1	3	4	8	-11	1	0	0
Ron Walters	C	17	2	1	3	9	0	0	0	0
Craig Hanmer	D	27	1	0	1	15	0	0	0	0
Brian McKenzie	LW	9	1	0	1	6	0	0	0	0
Andy Brown	G	52	0	1	1	75	0	0	0	0
Jacques Locas	C	11	0	1	1	2	0	0	0	0
Michel Dion	G	1	0	0	0	0	0	0	0	0
Ed Dyck	G	32	0	0	0	6	0	0	0	0
Rick Fraser	D	4	0	0	0	2	0	0	0	0

Goaltending

Player	MIN	GP	W	L	T	GA	GAA	SO
Andy Brown	2979	52	15	35	0	206	4.15	2
Ed Dyck	1692	32	3	21	3	123	4.36	0
Michel Dion	59	1	0	1	0	4	4.07	0
Team:	4730	78	18	57	3	333	4.22	2

Note: Pos = Position; GP = Games played; G = Goals; A = Assists; Pts = Points; +/- = plus/minus; PIM = Penalty minutes; PPG = Power-play goals; SHG = Short-handed goals; GWG = Game-winning goals
MIN = Minutes played; W = Wins; L = Losses; T = Ties; GA = Goals-against; GAA = Goals-against average; SO = Shutouts;

== Draft picks ==
Indianapolis's draft picks at the 1974 WHA Amateur Draft.

Round	#	Player	Nationality	College/Junior/Club team (League)
WHA Secret Amateur Draft
1	2	Bill Lochead (F)	Canada	Oshawa Generals (OHA)
2	17	Bob Bourne (C)	Canada	Saskatoon Blades (WCHL)
WHA Amateur Draft
1	2	Mike Will (C)	Canada	Edmonton Oil Kings (WCHL)
2	17	Craig Hanmer (D)	United States	St. Paul Vulcans (MidJHL)
3	32	Mike Wong (C)	United States	Minnesota Junior Stars (MidJHL)
4	47	Mike Zuke (C)	Canada	Michigan Tech (WCHA)
5	62	Pat Ribble (D)	Canada	Oshawa Generals (OHA)
6	76	Harold Snepsts (D)	Canada	Edmonton Oil Kings (WCHL)
7	91	Peter Roberts (C)	United States	St. Cloud Junior Blues (MidJHL)
7	92	John Sheridan (C)	United States	University of Minnesota (WCHA)
8	106	Tom Price (D)	Canada	Ottawa 67's (OHA)
8	107	Mark Toulet	Canada	University of Moncton (CIAU)
9	121	Michel Dion (G)	Canada	Montreal Red White and Blue (QMJHL)
10	136	Kevin Erickson (G)	Canada	Calgary Centennials (WCHL)
10	137	Jack Patterson (F)	Canada	Kamloops Chiefs (WCHL)
11	149	Don Wheldon (D)	United States	London Knights (OHA)
11	150	Gary Sargent (D)	United States	Fargo-Moorhead Sugar Kings (MidJHL)
11	155	Greg Steel (D)	Canada	Calgary Centennials (WCHL)
12	162	Pierre David (D)	Canada	Sorel Black Hawks (QMJHL)
12	163	Scott Mabley (D)	Canada	Sault Ste. Marie Greyhounds (OHA)
12	168	Russ Hall (D)	Canada	Winnipeg Clubs (WCHL)
13	175	Graham Hall (F)	Canada	Wexford Raiders (OPJHL)
13	176	Bill Best (LW)	Canada	Sudbury Wolves (OHA)
13	179	Mike St. Cyr (D)	Canada	Kitchener Rangers (OHA)
14	186	Rod Tordoff (D)	Canada	Swift Current Broncos (WCHL)
14	187	Doug Counter (D)	Canada	Aurora Tigers (OPJHL)
14	189	Mitch Babin (F)	Canada	North Bay Trappers (OPJHL)
15	193	Yves Plouffe (D)	Canada	Sorel Black Hawks (QMJHL)
15	194	Jim Chicoyne (D)	Canada	Brandon Wheat Kings (WCHL)
16	198	Brian Barker (RW)	Canada	Sorel Black Hawks (QMJHL)
17	202	Rick Fraser (D)	Canada	Oshawa Generals (OHA)
18	205	Larry Jacques (RW)	Canada	Ottawa 67's (OHA)
19	206	Bob Volpe (G)	Canada	Sudbury Wolves (OHA)

== See also ==
- 1974–75 WHA season
