= Greensboro Generals (1959–1977) =

American minor league professional ice hockey team (1959–1977)

- City: Greensboro, North Carolina
- League: EHL (1959–1973); SHL (1973–1977)
- Operated: 1959–1977
- Home arena: Greensboro Coliseum (1959–1975); Piedmont Arena (1975–1977)
- Colors: Green, gold, white, orange
- Affiliates: NHL (1967–1977); WHA (1972–1975)

Franchise history
- 1951–1959: Troy Bruins
- 1959–1977: Greensboro Generals

Championships
- Playoff championships: 1963 EHL

The Greensboro Generals were a minor league ice hockey team based in Greensboro, North Carolina. Greensboro was part of the Eastern Hockey League from 1959 to 1973, and then played in the Southern Hockey League from 1973 to 1977. The team was founded when the Troy Bruins of the International Hockey League were relocated by owner Ken Wilson and admitted to the EHL, to play in the recently built Greensboro Coliseum.

== History ==
The team was owned by a group of local investors led by Carson Bain, who brought in Roland McLenahan as the team's first coach. The Eastern Hockey League was classified as amateur, although Generals players were recruited and paid. The Generals debut game at the coliseum was a 4–1 victory versus Washington, played on November 11, 1959, in front of a crowd of 3,014. Goaltender Norm Defelice won the George Davis Trophy for the lowest goals against average in the 1959–60 season.

Ronnie Spong took charge of the Generals as player-coach in 1960, and remained in that role until 1971, leading the Generals to a winning record in all but one of those seasons. The Generals reached the championship finals three years in a row from 1962 to 1964, and won the league title in 1963. Centerman Don Davidson won the John Carlin Trophy in the 1963–64 season as the league's scoring champion. The Generals had solid goaltending in the late 1960s with Peter McDuffe winning the EHL Rookie of the Year in 1967–68, and Ernie Miller winning the George Davis Trophy in 1969–70 for the lowest GAA in the EHL. Greensboro returned to the league finals in 1970, but finished as runners-up.

In the spring of 1971, Bain and his partners sold the Generals to Tedd Munchak, owner of the Carolina Cougars of the American Basketball Association. Don Carter became player-coach in 1972, then was replaced by Bob Smith as goaltender and coach in 1973. At the end of the season, the Generals along with three other teams, announced that they would leave the EHL to form the Southern Hockey League.

Ted Lanyon became head coach for the 1973–74 season, but struggled in the new league dropping to third place. The Generals moved to the smaller Piedmont Arena in 1975 due to financial difficulty, and Ronnie Spong returned as head coach. The Generals finished last place in each of the final three seasons of play. On January 4, 1977, the Generals folded mid-season due to continued financial problems. Three other SHL clubs folded the same week, and the league folded on January 31.

=== Major league affiliations ===
The Generals were primarily affiliated with the World Hockey Association from 1972 to 1975, but also had secondary National Hockey League affiliations from 1967 to 1977.

| Years | Affiliations |
|---|---|
| 1967–71 | Chicago Blackhawks |
| 1971–72 | Toronto Maple Leafs |
| 1972–74 | Los Angeles Sharks |
| 1974–75 | Michigan Stags, Baltimore Blades, New York Islanders |
| 1975–76 | Detroit Red Wings, Washington Capitals |
| 1976–77 | Atlanta Flames, Cleveland Barons, Colorado Rockies |

== Notable players ==
Notable Greensboro Generals players that also played in the National Hockey League or World Hockey Association:

- Ron Anderson
- Steve Andrascik
- Jamie Bateman
- Jacques Blain
- Kirk Bowman
- Don Burgess
- Brian Bye
- Brian Cadle
- Jack Caffery
- Jeff Carlson
- Lyle Carter
- Chick Chalmers
- Jack Chipchase
- Mike Conroy
- Tom Cottringer
- Claude Cyr
- Murray Davison
- Norm Defelice
- Brian Derksen
- Jerry Engele
- John Fisher
- Greg Fox
- Russ Gillow
- Don Gordon
- Bruce Greig
- Howie Heggedal
- Earl Heiskala
- Paul Hoganson
- Bill Horton
- Don Howse
- Mike Hyndman
- Mike Jakubo
- Eddie Johnston
- Ed Johnstone
- Jim Jones
- Doug Kerslake
- Jarda Krupicka
- Moe L'Abbé
- Michel Lachance
- Ted Lanyon
- Barry Legge
- Bernie MacNeil
- Peter McDuffe
- Jimmy McLeod
- Rick Morris
- Bob Perreault
- Tony Poeta
- Jan Popiel
- Steve Richardson
- Lorne Rombough
- Bob Russell
- Barry Salovaara
- Nick Sanza
- Danny Schock
- Steve Self
- Tom Serviss
- Bob Sicinski
- Fred Speck
- Guy Trottier
- Gordon Tumilson
- Don Ward
- Jim Watson
- Steve West
- Alton White
- Ian Wilkie
- Gary Williamson
- Hal Willis
- Bob Winograd
- Roger Wilson
- Bill Young
- Jerry Zrymiak
- Wayne Zuk

== Results ==
Season-by-season results in the EHL and SHL.

| Season | Lge | GP | W | L | T | Pts | Pct | GF | GA | PIM | Standing | Playoffs |
|---|---|---|---|---|---|---|---|---|---|---|---|---|
| 1959–60 | EHL | 64 | 26 | 33 | 5 | 57 | 0.445 | 236 | 253 | 841 | 3rd, southern | Lost in round 1 |
| 1960–61 | EHL | 64 | 40 | 22 | 2 | 82 | 0.641 | 339 | 257 | 753 | 1st, southern | Lost in round 1 |
| 1961–62 | EHL | 68 | 36 | 30 | 2 | 74 | 0.544 | 284 | 258 | 505 | 1st, southern | Lost in finals |
| 1962–63 | EHL | 68 | 40 | 26 | 2 | 82 | 0.603 | 305 | 263 | 588 | 1st, southern | Won championship |
| 1963–64 | EHL | 72 | 41 | 29 | 2 | 84 | 0.583 | 294 | 257 | 877 | 1st, southern | Lost in finals |
| 1964–65 | EHL | 72 | 37 | 33 | 2 | 76 | 0.528 | 333 | 301 | 619 | 2nd, southern | Lost in round 1 |
| 1965–66 | EHL | 72 | 37 | 31 | 4 | 78 | 0.542 | 291 | 263 | 785 | 3rd, southern | Lost in round 1 |
| 1966–67 | EHL | 72 | 35 | 37 | 0 | 70 | 0.486 | 265 | 279 | 997 | 3rd, southern | Lost in round 1 |
| 1967–68 | EHL | 72 | 46 | 20 | 6 | 98 | 0.681 | 364 | 248 | 906 | 1st, southern | Lost in round 2 |
| 1968–69 | EHL | 72 | 41 | 22 | 9 | 91 | 0.632 | 350 | 279 | 681 | 1st, southern | Lost in round 2 |
| 1969–70 | EHL | 74 | 45 | 22 | 7 | 97 | 0.655 | 333 | 241 | 1123 | 1st, southern | Lost in finals |
| 1970–71 | EHL | 73 | 44 | 21 | 8 | 96 | 0.658 | 340 | 234 | 1132 | 2nd, southern | Lost in round 2 |
| 1971–72 | EHL | 73 | 34 | 27 | 12 | 80 | 0.548 | 284 | 252 | 1229 | 2nd, southern | Lost in round 2 |
| 1972–73 | EHL | 76 | 40 | 28 | 8 | 88 | 0.579 | 391 | 315 | 1382 | 2nd, southern | Lost in round 1 |
| 1973–74 | SHL | 71 | 33 | 37 | 1 | 67 | 0.472 | 285 | 310 | 1168 | 3rd, SHL | Lost in round 1 |
| 1974–75 | SHL | 72 | 23 | 47 | 2 | 48 | 0.333 | 262 | 384 | 1280 | 5th, SHL | Out of playoffs |
| 1975–76 | SHL | 72 | 18 | 42 | 12 | 48 | 0.333 | 221 | 317 | 1212 | 6th, SHL | Out of playoffs |
| 1976–77 | SHL | 40 | 15 | 24 | 1 | 31 | 0.388 | 140 | 173 | 798 | 6th, SHL | folded |
| TOTALS | EHL | 992 | 542 | 381 | 69 | 1153 | 0.581 | 4409 | 3700 | 12418 | 7 division titles | 1 championship |
| TOTALS | SHL | 255 | 89 | 150 | 16 | 194 | 0.380 | 908 | 1184 | 4458 | | |
