= Larry Johnston =

Canadian ice hockey player

- Born: July 20, 1943 (age 83) Kitchener, Ontario, Canada
- Height: 5 ft 11 in (180 cm)
- Weight: 195 lb (88 kg; 13 st 13 lb)
- Position: Defence
- Shot: Right
- Played for: NHL; Los Angeles Kings; Detroit Red Wings; Kansas City Scouts; Colorado Rockies; WHA; Michigan Stags/Baltimore Blades
- Playing career: 1963–1977

Larry Stuart Roy Johnston (born July 20, 1943) is a Canadian former professional ice hockey defenceman who played for over 14 years in seven different hockey leagues. He spent the most time with the Springfield Indians/Kings of the American Hockey League and the Detroit Red Wings of the National Hockey League, where he served a short term as captain. He also played 49 games in the World Hockey Association.

== Playing career ==
=== Minor league hockey ===
The Toronto Maple Leafs drafted Johnston in 1965. Johnston had spent the previous two seasons playing for the Johnstown Jets of the EHL and the Tulsa Oilers of the Central Hockey League (CHL). Johnston was traded to the American Hockey League's Springfield Indians for Bruce Gamble. The hockey club was purchased by the Los Angeles Kings of the National Hockey League (NHL) and renamed the Springfield Kings. In the 1967–68 season he made four appearances with the Los Angeles Kings, picking up four penalty minutes and a −7 plus/minus rating. He wouldn't reach the NHL again for three more seasons.

In 1969, he was named the most valuable player in Springfield and also led the AHL in penalty minutes in 1968 and 1969. With his increased value, Johnston was traded by Los Angeles to the Detroit Red Wings along with Dale Rolfe and Gary Croteau for Garry Monahan, Brian Gibbons and Matt Ravlich on February 20, 1970. He started in the CHL with the Fort Worth Wings before quickly moving back up to the AHL with the Baltimore Clippers.

=== Reaching the NHL ===
The following season, Johnston played 12 games with the Tidewater Wings of the AHL before he was brought up to the Detroit Red Wings to finish out the 1971–72 season. After ten seasons in the minor leagues, Johnston finally found his place in the NHL with Detroit. He would finish his first season with a +20 rating, 24 points and 111 penalty minutes. He was a bright spot on a team that was losing its direction after the Stanley Cup-winning seasons of the 1950s. He played three seasons in Detroit before signing with the Michigan Stags of the WHA in July 1974 and played there until a rash of injuries shut him down. The Stags transferred to Baltimore during the 1974–75 season becoming the Baltimore Blades.

According to the book Icing On The Plains: The Rough Ride of Kansas City's NHL Scouts (pp. 137–138, Troy Treasure, Balboa Press), when the Michigan franchise moved to Baltimore to be operated by the WHA, Johnston claimed the league failed to properly abide by the terms of his contract. The WHA countered Johnston was not putting forth proper effort on the ice.

"Johnston didn't want to play here and he wasn't performing up to expectations," Blades executive director Skip Feldman told the Kansas City Star. "He was just going through the motions. His release was by mutual agreement." According to published reports, Johnston's agent Bob Wolfe told Baltimore media his client had effectively bought out the remainder of his contract for what he was owed for the rest of the season.

The Kansas City Scouts acquired Johnston on March 1, 1975, in exchange for an undetermined amount of cash to add muscle and organization to their young defence. Johnston signed for the remainder of the 1974–75 season and the following year. Johnston had one full season with Kansas City in 1975–76 before the franchise relocated to Denver, Colorado, as the Colorado Rockies. Johnston suited up for 25 games in the 1976–77 season, which were his last in the NHL.

Johnston played the remainder of that season for the Maine Nordiques of the North American Hockey League and retired in 1977.

== Career statistics ==
			Regular season					Playoffs
Season	Team	League	GP	G	A	Pts	PIM	GP	G	A	Pts	PIM
1962–63	Waterloo Siskins	CJHL	—	—	—	—	—	—	—	—	—	—
1963–64	Johnstown Jets	EHL	71	7	39	46	356	10	3	5	8	50
1964–65	Tulsa Oilers	CPHL	57	4	16	20	262	12	0	4	4	41
1965–66	Springfield Indians	AHL	29	2	5	7	58	—	—	—	—	—
1965–66	Tulsa Oilers	CPHL	36	2	6	8	129	10	2	2	4	26
1966–67	Springfield Indians	AHL	59	4	14	18	93	—	—	—	—	—
1967–68	Los Angeles Kings	NHL	4	0	0	0	4	—	—	—	—	—
1967–68	Springfield Indians	AHL	60	2	22	24	197	4	0	2	2	22
1968–69	Springfield Indians	AHL	74	3	21	24	240	—	—	—	—	—
1969–70	Springfield Indians	AHL	52	3	24	27	150	—	—	—	—	—
1969–70	Fort Worth Wings	CHL	13	1	0	1	60	7	0	1	1	7
1970–71	Baltimore Clippers	AHL	58	2	14	16	198	6	0	1	1	12
1971–72	Detroit Red Wings	NHL	65	4	20	24	111	—	—	—	—	—
1971–72	Tidewater Wings	AHL	12	1	1	2	45	—	—	—	—	—
1972–73	Detroit Red Wings	NHL	73	1	12	13	169	—	—	—	—	—
1973–74	Detroit Red Wings	NHL	65	2	12	14	139	—	—	—	—	—
1974–75	Michigan Stags/Baltimore Blades	WHA	49	0	9	9	93	—	—	—	—	—
1974–75	Kansas City Scouts	NHL	16	0	7	7	10	—	—	—	—	—
1975–76	Kansas City Scouts	NHL	72	2	10	12	112	—	—	—	—	—
1976–77	Colorado Rockies	NHL	25	0	3	3	35	—	—	—	—	—
1976–77	Maine Nordiques	NAHL	51	4	22	26	62	—	—	—	—	—
AHL totals			344	17	101	118	981	10	0	3	3	34
NHL totals			320	9	64	73	580	—	—	—	—	—
WHA totals			49	0	9	9	93	—	—	—	—	—

Preceded by Mickey Redmond	Detroit Red Wings captain 1974	Succeeded by Marcel Dionne
