= Pierre Guité =

Canadian ice hockey player (born 1952)

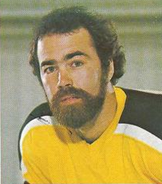
- Born: April 17, 1952 (age 74) Montreal, Quebec, Canada
- Height: 6 ft 2 in (188 cm)
- Weight: 190 lb (86 kg; 13 st 8 lb)
- Position: Left wing
- Shot: Left
- Played for: Quebec Nordiques; Michigan Stags; Baltimore Blades; Cincinnati Stingers; Edmonton Oilers
- NHL draft: 26th overall, 1972; Detroit Red Wings
- WHA draft: Undrafted
- Playing career: 1972–1979

Pierre Guité (born April 17, 1952) is a Canadian former professional ice hockey player who played 377 games in the World Hockey Association. He played for the Quebec Nordiques, Michigan Stags, Baltimore Blades, Cincinnati Stingers and Edmonton Oilers. He was traded from the Nordiques to the financially troubled Stags, along with Michel Rouleau and Alain Caron, for Marc Tardif (who became the all-time leading goal scorer in the WHA), just weeks before the Stags folded and the league took over the team, moving it to Baltimore.

As a youth, Guité played in the 1964 Quebec International Pee-Wee Hockey Tournament with a minor ice hockey team from Ville-Émard.

His son, Ben Guité, played in the National Hockey League.

== Career statistics ==
=== Regular season and playoffs ===
| | | | Regular season | | | | | Playoffs |
| Season | Team | League | GP | G | A | Pts | PIM | GP | G | A | Pts | PIM |
|---|---|---|---|---|---|---|---|---|---|---|---|---|
| 1969–70 | St. Catharines Black Hawks | OHA | 51 | 31 | 30 | 61 | 162 | — | — | — | — | — |
| 1970–71 | St. Catharines Black Hawks | OHA | 56 | 25 | 14 | 39 | 113 | — | — | — | — | — |
| 1971–72 | University of Pennsylvania | ECAC | Statistics Unavailable |
| 1972–73 | Quebec Nordiques | WHA | 66 | 10 | 8 | 18 | 136 | — | — | — | — | — |
| 1973–74 | Quebec Nordiques | WHA | 72 | 14 | 20 | 34 | 106 | — | — | — | — | — |
| 1974–75 | Quebec Nordiques | WHA | 22 | 14 | 8 | 22 | 59 | — | — | — | — | — |
| 1974–75 | Michigan Stags/Baltimore Blades | WHA | 13 | 5 | 4 | 9 | 11 | — | — | — | — | — |
| 1975–76 | Cincinnati Stingers | WHA | 52 | 20 | 24 | 44 | 80 | — | — | — | — | — |
| 1976–77 | Cincinnati Stingers | WHA | 27 | 10 | 8 | 18 | 32 | — | — | — | — | — |
| 1976–77 | Quebec Nordiques | WHA | 35 | 2 | 6 | 8 | 67 | 17 | 5 | 0 | 5 | 9 |
| 1977–78 | Quebec Nordiques | WHA | 18 | 4 | 5 | 9 | 15 | — | — | — | — | — |
| 1977–78 | Edmonton Oilers | WHA | 60 | 12 | 21 | 33 | 71 | 5 | 1 | 1 | 2 | 20 |
| 1978–79 | Binghamton Dusters | AHL | 6 | 1 | 1 | 2 | 0 | 10 | 1 | 4 | 5 | 41 |
| 1978–79 | Dallas Black Hawks | CHL | 1 | 0 | 0 | 0 | 5 | — | — | — | — | — |
| 1978–79 | Edmonton Oilers | WHA | 12 | 1 | 1 | 2 | 8 | — | — | — | — | — |
| WHA totals | | | 377 | 92 | 105 | 197 | 585 | 22 | 6 | 1 | 7 | 29 |
