= Alain Caron =

Alain Caron may refer to:

- Alain Caron (ice hockey) (1938–1986), Canadian ice hockey player
- Alain Caron (bassist) (born 1955), French Canadian jazz bassist
