= Mike Conroy =

Mike Conroy may refer to:

- Mike Conroy (footballer, born 1957), Scottish former professional footballer who played for, amongst other clubs, Celtic
- Mike Conroy (footballer, born 1965), Scottish former professional footballer who played for, amongst other clubs, Clydebank
- Mike Conroy (ice hockey) (born 1950), Canadian former professional ice hockey player
- Mike Conroy (writer), English comics historian
