= Mike Jakubo =

Mike Jakubo may refer to:

- Mike Jakubo (ice hockey) (born 1947), Canadian ice hockey player
- Mike Jakubo (curler) (born 1982), Canadian curler
