= Ray Clearwater =

Canadian ice hockey player (born 1942)

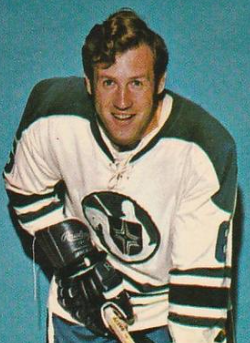
- Clearwater in 1972–73
- Born: November 10, 1942 (age 83) Winnipeg, Manitoba, Canada
- Height: 5 ft 11 in (180 cm)
- Weight: 175 lb (79 kg; 12 st 7 lb)
- Position: Defence
- Shot: Left
- Played for: Cleveland Crusaders; Minnesota Fighting Saints
- Playing career: 1963–1980

Ray Clearwater (born November 10, 1942) is a Canadian retired professional ice hockey player who played 214 games in the World Hockey Association for the Cleveland Crusaders and Minnesota Fighting Saints.

Clearwater was born in Winnipeg, Manitoba. He played junior hockey with the Winnipeg Braves of the Manitoba Junior Hockey League from 1960 to 1963. He turned professional in 1963 with the New Haven Blades. He played for various teams in North American minor professional leagues until 1972 when the WHA was formed and he joined the new Cleveland Crusaders team. He played three seasons with Cleveland and several games for the Minnesota Fighting Saints.

== Career statistics ==
=== Regular season and playoffs ===
			Regular season					Playoffs
Season	Team	League	GP	G	A	Pts	PIM	GP	G	A	Pts	PIM
1961–62	Winnipeg Braves	MJHL	Statistics Unavailable
1962–63	Winnipeg Braves	MJHL	Statistics Unavailable
1963–64	New Haven Blades	EHL	59	15	29	44	50	5	2	1	3	0
1964–65	New Haven Blades	EHL	70	13	33	46	55	—	—	—	—	—
1964–65	Minneapolis Bruins	CPHL	3	0	0	0	2	—	—	—	—	—
1965–66	New Haven Blades	EHL	72	19	34	53	43	3	2	0	2	7
1966–67	Providence Reds	AHL	63	2	13	15	46	—	—	—	—	—
1967–68	Providence Reds	AHL	67	5	15	20	62	8	1	4	5	12
1968–69	Providence Reds	AHL	69	8	19	27	92	9	0	1	1	12
1969–70	Providence Reds	AHL	3	1	3	4	2	—	—	—	—	—
1969–70	Salt Lake Golden Eagles	WHL	67	12	25	37	62	—	—	—	—	—
1970–71	Providence Reds	AHL	63	8	31	39	80	9	0	2	2	8
1971–72	Providence Reds	AHL	76	12	36	48	69	5	1	2	3	4
1972–73	Cleveland Crusaders	WHA	78	11	36	47	41	9	1	2	3	8
1973–74	Cleveland Crusaders	WHA	68	12	23	35	47	5	0	0	0	2
1974–75	Cleveland Crusaders	WHA	66	4	18	22	51	4	1	1	2	0
1975–76	Baltimore Clippers	AHL	62	8	27	35	66	—	—	—	—	—
1976–77	Minnesota Fighting Saints	WHA	2	0	0	0	2	—	—	—	—	—
1977–78	New Haven Nighthawks	AHL	74	4	26	30	65	15	0	5	5	2
1978–79	New Haven Nighthawks	AHL	74	6	17	23	61	10	0	2	2	6
1979–80	New Haven Nighthawks	AHL	14	1	1	2	6	—	—	—	—	—
1979–80	Richmond Rifles	EHL	3	0	0	0	2	—	—	—	—	—
WHA totals			214	27	77	104	141	18	2	3	5	10
