= Fred Speck =

Canadian ice hockey player

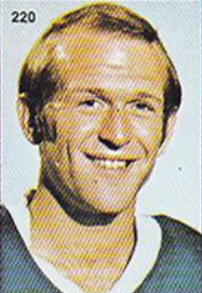
- Speck in 1971-72 sticker
- Born: July 22, 1947 Thorold, Ontario, Canada
- Died: February 10, 2011 (aged 63) Hamilton, Ontario, Canada
- Height: 5 ft 9 in (175 cm)
- Weight: 165 lb (75 kg; 11 st 11 lb)
- Position: Centre
- Shot: Left
- Played for: Detroit Red Wings; Cleveland Barons; Vancouver Canucks; Minnesota Fighting Saints; Los Angeles Sharks; Michigan Stags
- Playing career: 1968–1978

Frederick Edmondstone Speck (July 22, 1947 – February 10, 2011) was a Canadian professional ice hockey player. A centre, Speck had a brief major league career, playing in 28 games in the National Hockey League with the Detroit Red Wings and Vancouver Canucks, and 111 games in the World Hockey Association. For most of his career Speck played in the minor leagues, and in 1970–71, his first season in the American Hockey League, he was the top scorer, and was also named the most valuable player and rookie of the year.

== Professional career ==
=== Minor league hockey ===
Speck was signed by the Detroit Red Wings of the NHL after a scout saw him playing junior hockey in Ontario. He was signed and played one game with the Hamilton Red Wings of the Ontario Hockey Association in 1963. He received more ice time the following season and began to produce offensively, scoring 8 points in 17 games. His totals increased the following year, with 34 points in 41 games. Over the next three seasons with Hamilton Speck's totals increased, and he scored 197 points between 1965–66 and 1967–68, including 85 points in his final season. In 1967–68 he made his professional debut, playing one regular season game and three more in the playoffs for the Fort Worth Wings of the Central Hockey League that season, scoring a goal and an assist in his first game, and scoring four points in the playoffs. Speck joined Fort Worth full-time for the 1968–69, recording 45 points.

=== Playing in the NHL ===
Speck made his National Hockey League debut with the Detroit Red Wings during the 1968–69 season, playing five games for them. He played another five games for Detroit in the 1969–70 season, but was held pointless. Still playing with Fort Worth, Speck scored 76 points in 1969–70. After CHL playoffs ended Speck joined the San Diego Gulls of the Western Hockey League for a two playoff games, and moved to the Baltimore Clippers of the American Hockey League in 1970–71. Speck scored 92 points and led the team to a first place AHL finish. Speck was named to the AHL first All-star team, and won three league awards: the Dudley "Red" Garrett Memorial Award, the John B. Sollenberger Trophy, and the Les Cunningham Award. On June 8, 1971, after the season ended the Vancouver Canucks claimed Speck in the Intra-League Draft. Speck joined the new NHL club for their first 18 games scoring one goal and two assists.

=== Finishing in the WHA and the minors ===
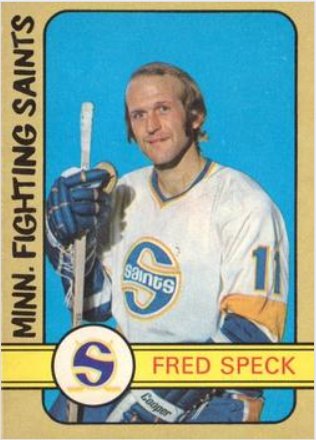
1972-73 OPC card of Speck for Minnesota Fighting Saints

The Canucks reassigned Speck to the minor leagues, and he split the season between the Cleveland Barons of the AHL and the Seattle Totems of the WHL. The following season saw Speck sign with the Minnesota Fighting Saints of the World Hockey Association, where he played 47 games before being traded for Bill Young in February to the Los Angeles Sharks. He played with the Sharks for 18 games of the 1973–74 season. Speck finished the season with the Greensboro Generals of the Southern Hockey League. The Sharks moved to Detroit for the 1974–75 season and became the Michigan Stags, midway through the season the Stags relocated to Baltimore becoming the Baltimore Blades. Speck split the 74–75 season between Michigan/Baltimore and with the Syracuse Blazers of the North American Hockey League. Speck scored 34 points in 17 games and led the Blazers to a first-place finish during the season. After Syracuse, Speck re-joined the Baltimore Clippers, leading the team in scoring with 75 points in 76 games for the 1975–76 season. After one season in Baltimore Speck joined the Brantford Alexanders of the upstart OHA Senior A Hockey League and played two seasons before retiring in 1977.

== Personal ==
Speck met his wife while playing junior hockey with the Hamilton Red Wings. Fred and Linda had two children, son Wade and daughter Paige. After retiring from hockey in 1978, Speck became a sales manager, a career he continued until he became ill in November 2010. He started to lose weight and died of an unknown illness on February 10, 2011.

== Career statistics ==
=== Regular season and playoffs ===
			Regular season					Playoffs
Season	Team	League	GP	G	A	Pts	PIM	GP	G	A	Pts	PIM
1962–63	Hamilton Red Wings	OHA	1	0	0	0	0	—	—	—	—	—
1963–64	Hamilton Red Wings	OHA	17	2	6	8	20	—	—	—	—	—
1964–65	Hamilton Red Wings	OHA	41	16	18	34	108	—	—	—	—	—
1965–66	Hamilton Red Wings	OHA	48	20	37	57	123	5	1	2	3	8
1966–67	Hamilton Red Wings	OHA	39	23	32	55	67	13	4	6	10	14
1967–68	Hamilton Red Wings	OHA	52	31	54	85	115	11	6	8	14	15
1967–68	Fort Worth Wings	CHL	1	1	1	2	2	3	1	3	4	4
1968–69	Detroit Red Wings	NHL	5	0	0	0	2	—	—	—	—	—
1968–69	Fort Worth Wings	CHL	63	21	24	45	26	—	—	—	—	—
1969–70	Detroit Red Wings	NHL	5	0	0	0	0	—	—	—	—	—
1969–70	Fort Worth Wings	CHL	67	30	46	76	47	7	0	3	3	7
1969–70	San Diego Gulls	WHL	—	—	—	—	—	2	0	0	0	0
1970–71	Baltimore Clippers	AHL	72	31	61	92	40	6	4	5	9	4
1971–72	Vancouver Canucks	NHL	18	1	2	3	0	—	—	—	—	—
1971–72	Seattle Totems	WHL	6	3	3	6	0	—	—	—	—	—
1971–72	Cleveland Barons	AHL	27	6	8	14	21	6	0	1	1	6
1972–73	Minnesota Fighting Saints	WHA	47	13	16	29	52	—	—	—	—	—
1972–73	Los Angeles Sharks	WHA	28	3	13	16	22	6	3	2	5	2
1973–74	Los Angeles Sharks	WHA	18	2	5	7	4	—	—	—	—	—
1973–74	Greensboro Generals	SHL	8	1	3	4	19	—	—	—	—	—
1974–75	Michigan Stags/Baltimore Blades	WHA	30	4	8	12	18	—	—	—	—	—
1974–75	Syracuse Blazers	NAHL	17	11	23	34	16	7	2	6	8	16
1975–76	Baltimore Clippers	AHL	76	23	52	75	93	—	—	—	—	—
1976–77	Brantford Alexanders	OHA-Sr	27	16	21	37	29	—	—	—	—	—
1976–77	Brantford Alexanders	OHA-Sr	38	17	35	52	57	—	—	—	—	—
WHA totals			123	22	42	64	96	6	3	2	5	2
NHL totals			28	1	2	3	2	—	—	—	—	—

== Awards and achievements ==
- AHL First All-Star Team': 1970–71
- Dudley "Red" Garrett Memorial Award, (AHL Rookie of the Year): 1970–71
- John B. Sollenberger Trophy, (AHL Leading Scorer): 1970–71
- Les Cunningham Award, (AHL MVP): 1970–71
