= Murray Davison =

Canadian ice hockey player

- Born: June 10, 1938 Brantford, Ontario, Canada
- Died: January 13, 2000 (aged 61) Colorado, USA
- Height: 6 ft 2 in (188 cm)
- Weight: 190 lb (86 kg; 13 st 8 lb)
- Position: Defence
- Shot: Right
- Played for: Boston Bruins
- Playing career: 1958–1971

Murray Dennis Davison (June 10, 1938 – January 13, 2000) was a Canadian professional ice hockey defenceman who played in one National Hockey League game for the Boston Bruins during the 1965–66 season. After this, Murray spent six seasons with the Blazers, four of which he served as a player/coach. After suiting up for just one game with Oklahoma City in 1970–71, Davison retired as a player.

== Career statistics ==
=== Regular season and playoffs ===
			Regular season					Playoffs
Season	Team	League	GP	G	A	Pts	PIM	GP	G	A	Pts	PIM
1955–56	Barrie Flyers	OHA	47	2	7	9	82	18	0	2	2	32
1956–57	Barrie Flyers	OHA	52	6	7	13	53	3	0	0	0	8
1957–58	Barrie Flyers	OHA	51	7	20	27	171	4	2	0	2	12
1958–59	Quebec Aces	QHL	3	0	0	0	0	—	—	—	—	—
1958–59	Kitchener-Waterloo Dutchmen	OHA Sr	54	3	13	16	125	11	1	3	4	36
1959–60	Kitchener-Waterloo Dutchmen	OHA Sr	48	0	11	11	63	8	2	4	6	4
1960–61	Cleveland Barons	AHL	1	0	0	0	0	4	0	0	0	0
1960–61	Greensboro Generals	EHL	64	4	37	41	106	9	0	4	4	10
1961–62	Cleveland Barons	AHL	65	1	6	7	53	6	0	0	0	0
1962–63	Cleveland Barons	AHL	3	0	0	0	6	—	—	—	—	—
1962–63	Springfield Indians	AHL	33	3	8	11	20	—	—	—	—	—
1964–65	Welland Wildcats	OHA Sr	25	5	10	15	33	—	—	—	—	—
1965–66	Boston Bruins	NHL	1	0	0	0	0	—	—	—	—	—
1965–66	Oklahoma City Blazers	CHL	58	1	12	13	88	9	0	6	6	6
1966–67	Oklahoma City Blazers	CHL	41	0	6	6	83	5	1	0	1	8
1967–68	Oklahoma City Blazers	CHL	57	3	13	16	128	5	0	2	2	25
1968–69	Oklahoma City Blazers	CHL	28	1	3	4	63	7	0	1	1	21
1969–70	Oklahoma City Blazers	CHL	38	0	4	4	176	—	—	—	—	—
1970–71	Oklahoma City Blazers	CHL	1	0	0	0	0	—	—	—	—	—
1976–77	Oklahoma City Blazers	CHL	29	1	5	6	81	—	—	—	—	—
CHL totals			252	6	43	49	619	28	1	9	10	60
NHL totals			1	0	0	0	0	—	—	—	—	—

== See also ==
- List of players who played only one game in the NHL
