= Waterloo Memorial Recreation Complex =

Recreation facility in Waterloo, Ontario, Canada

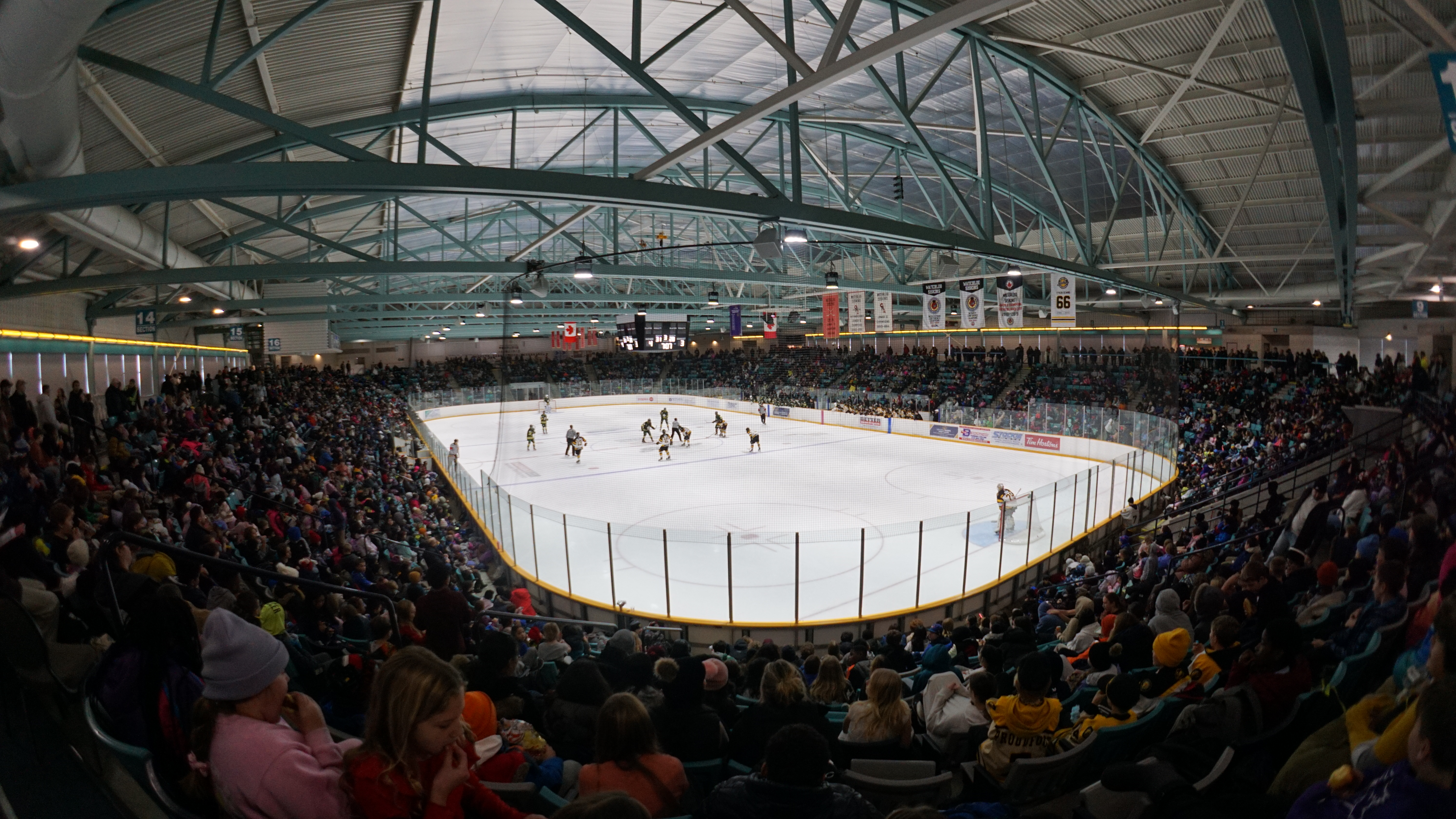
- Sun Life Financial Arena
- Interactive map of Waterloo Memorial Recreation Complex
- Former names: Waterloo Recreation Complex
- Address: 101 Father David Bauer Drive; Waterloo, Ontario
- Coordinates: 43°27′52″N 80°31′56″W
- Owner: City Of Waterloo
- Operator: City Of Waterloo
- Capacity: 4,400 - Hockey
- Field size: Ice Hockey(98.4 ft × 197 ft)

Construction
- Opened: 1993
- Cost: $17.6 million
- Architect: Parkin Architects Limited

Tenants
- Waterloo Siskins (GOJHL),1993-Present; Wilfrid Laurier Golden Hawks hockey,1993-Present; Kitchener-Waterloo Kodiaks Major Series Lacrosse, 2003-2016

Website
- www.waterloo.ca/en/things-to-do/waterloo-memorial-recreation-complex.aspx

The Waterloo Memorial Recreation Complex is a recreation facility in Waterloo, Ontario, Canada. It is located on Father David Bauer Drive, west of Uptown. The complex contains the Sun Life Financial Arena, a 4,132-seat multi-purpose arena that is home to the Waterloo Siskins and the Wilfrid Laurier Golden Hawks hockey teams, the Kitchener-Waterloo Kodiaks Major Series Lacrosse team, and the Swimplex, a 30m pool that was the city's first municipally owned indoor pool.

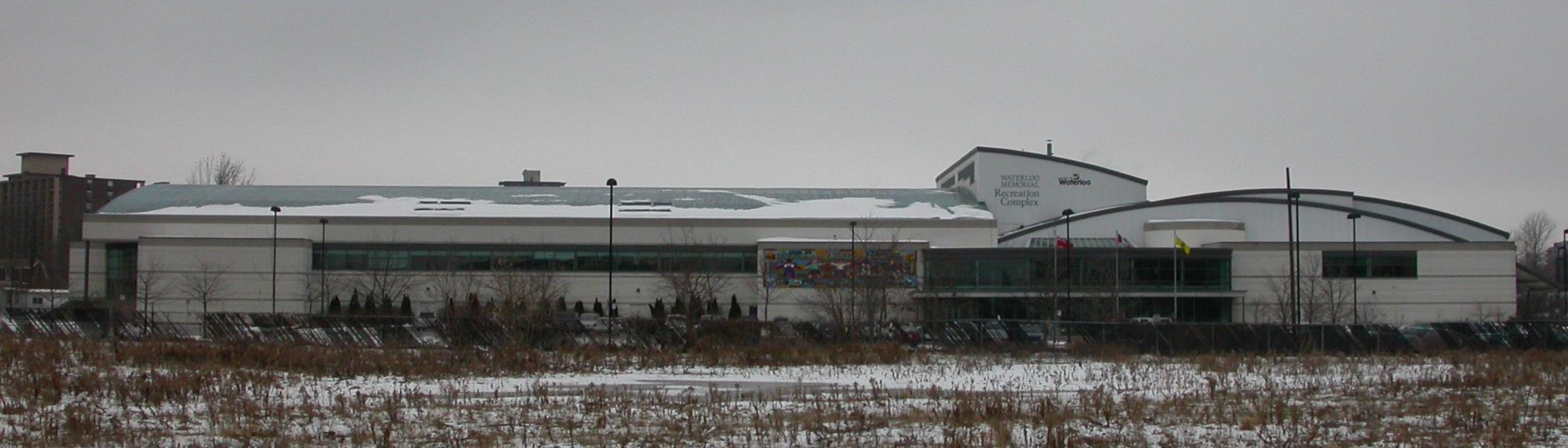
Waterloo Memorial Recreation Complex.

Construction of the $21 million facility began in December 1991 and the Rec Complex opened in September 1993. The facility was described as the "largest and most expensive project in the city's history".

While under construction, the site was selected for the 1994 Scott Tournament of Hearts, a Canadian women's curling championship. It was called the Waterloo Recreation Complex until May 2002, when Memorial was added after the city closed the Waterloo Memorial Arena.

The building honours the 69 Waterloo residents killed in the two world wars.
