= Al Rycroft =

Canadian ice hockey player

- Born: September 1, 1950 (age 75) Beaverlodge, Alberta, Canada
- Height: 5 ft 9 in (175 cm)
- Weight: 170 lb (77 kg; 12 st 2 lb)
- Position: Forward
- Shot: Left
- Played for: Cleveland Crusaders (WHA)
- NHL draft: Undrafted
- Playing career: 1971–1975

Allen Bruce Rycroft (born September 1, 1950) is a Canadian former professional ice hockey player.

During the 1972–73 season, Rycroft played seven games in the World Hockey Association with the Cleveland Crusaders.

== Career statistics ==
=== Regular season and playoffs ===
			Regular season					Playoffs
Season	Team	League	GP	G	A	Pts	PIM	GP	G	A	Pts	PIM
1967–68	Calgary Centennials	WCJHL	54	10	18	28	19	—	—	—	—	—
1968–69	Ponoka Stampeders	AJHL	Statistics Unavailable
1968–69	Calgary Centennials	WCHL	40	13	14	27	36	—	—	—	—	—
1969–70	Calgary Centennials	WCHL	52	15	28	43	37	—	—	—	—	—
1970–71	Calgary Centennials	WCHL	63	52	46	98	49	—	—	—	—	—
1971–72	Fort Wayne Komets	IHL	38	19	26	45	4	8	2	5	7	6
1971–72	Seattle Totems	WHL	24	3	4	7	8	—	—	—	—	—
1972–73	Cleveland Crusaders	WHA	7	0	2	2	0	—	—	—	—	—
1972–73	Syracuse Blazers	EHL	48	50	50	100	32	9	5	11	16	7
1973–74	Jacksonville Barons	AHL	27	9	9	18	6	—	—	—	—	—
1973–74	Macon Whoopees	SHL	53	38	31	69	18	—	—	—	—	—
1974–75	Syracuse Eagles	AHL	70	25	31	56	21	1	0	0	0	0
WHA totals			7	0	2	2	0	—	—	—	—	—
