= Roger Wilson (ice hockey) =

Canadian ice hockey player

- Born: September 18, 1946 (age 78); Sudbury, Ontario, Canada
- Height: 5 ft 11 in (180 cm)
- Weight: 175 lb (79 kg; 12 st 7 lb)
- Position: Defence
- Shot: Right
- Played for: Chicago Black Hawks
- Playing career: 1966–1975

Roger Sidney Wilson (born September 18, 1946) is a Canadian former ice hockey player. After ten years of minor league play, from 1966 to 1975, he played 7 games in the National Hockey League for the Chicago Black Hawks during the 1974–75 season.

== Career statistics ==
=== Regular season and playoffs ===
			Regular season					Playoffs
Season	Team	League	GP	G	A	Pts	PIM	GP	G	A	Pts	PIM
1965–66	Sudbury Cub-Wolves	NOJHA	37	10	33	43	152	6	0	5	5	6
1966–67	Columbus Checkers	IHL	3	0	0	0	9	—	—	—	—	—
1966–67	Sudbury Cub-Wolves	NOJHA	33	17	30	47	188	5	2	1	3	8
1967–68	Greensboro Generals	EHL	71	9	31	40	182	11	3	4	7	21
1968–69	Dallas Black Hawks	CHL	4	0	0	0	13	—	—	—	—	—
1968–69	Greensboro Generals	EHL	70	9	28	37	128	8	1	2	3	10
1969–70	Dallas Black Hawks	CHL	3	0	0	0	0	—	—	—	—	—
1969–70	Greensboro Generals	EHL	69	13	26	39	205	16	2	2	4	8
1970–71	Greensboro Generals	EHL	71	21	49	70	285	9	4	5	9	12
1971–72	Dallas Black Hawks	CHL	72	4	20	24	173	12	1	4	5	20
1972–73	Dallas Black Hawks	CHL	65	7	27	34	120	7	0	1	1	12
1973–74	Dallas Black Hawks	CHL	61	9	21	30	124	10	1	5	6	19
1974–75	Chicago Black Hawks	NHL	7	0	2	2	6	—	—	—	—	—
1974–75	Dallas Black Hawks	CHL	52	6	27	33	71	10	1	1	2	16
CHL totals			257	26	95	121	501	39	3	11	14	67
EHL totals			281	52	134	186	800	44	10	13	23	51
NHL totals			7	0	2	2	6	—	—	—	—	—
