= Barry Legge =

Canadian ice hockey player

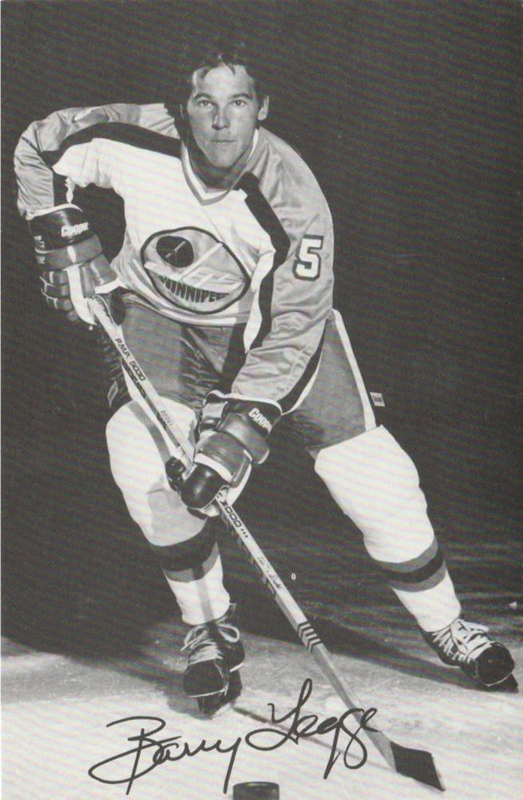
- Born: October 22, 1954 (age 71) Winnipeg, Manitoba, Canada
- Height: 6 ft 0 in (183 cm)
- Weight: 186 lb (84 kg; 13 st 4 lb)
- Position: Defence
- Shot: Left
- Played for: Michigan Stags; Baltimore Blades; Cleveland Crusaders; Denver Spurs; Ottawa Civics; Cincinnati Stingers; Minnesota Fighting Saints; Quebec Nordiques; Winnipeg Jets
- NHL draft: 61st overall, 1974; Montreal Canadiens
- WHA draft: 34th overall, 1974; Michigan Stags
- Playing career: 1974–1982

Barry Graham Legge (born October 22, 1954) is a Canadian former professional ice hockey player who played 107 games in the National Hockey League and 345 games in the World Hockey Association. He played for the Winnipeg Jets, Quebec Nordiques, Michigan Stags, Baltimore Blades, Denver Spurs, Ottawa Civics, Cleveland Crusaders, Minnesota Fighting Saints, and Cincinnati Stingers. Barry Legge was inducted into the Manitoba Hockey Hall of Fame in 2022.

== Career ==
After five full seasons in the WHA, Barry Legge spent part of three seasons with the Quebec Nordiques and the Winnipeg Jets from 1979-80 to 1981-82. He was well known for his defensive play from a very young age. The Winnipeg native first made a name for himself with the Fort St. James Canadians before joining the hometown Jets of the WCJHL. After being selected in the 4th round of the 1974 NHL Draft by the Montreal Canadiens, Legge opted to join the Michigan Stags of the WHA, who had selected him in the 1974 WHA Amateur Draft and ended up playing on half a dozen teams before the league disbanded in 1979. Legge's best season was a 29-point effort on the Cincinnati Stingers in 1976-77. Following the NHL/WHA merger, the Winnipeg Jets claimed Legge off the Stingers' roster. A few days later, he was traded to the Nordiques for rugged defenceman Barry Melrose. He recorded three assists in 31 games for the Nords, but his season ended on a sour note when he refused an assignment to the minor leagues and was suspended by the team as a result. After the season, Legge was sent to the Jets for cash and split the next two seasons between the NHL and the CHL's Tulsa Oilers. He retired the next year after playing 38 games for Winnipeg and battling injuries.

With the Michigan Stags and Baltimore Blades as a rookie, and the following year with the Cleveland Crusaders, he was a teammate of namesake Randy Legge; however the two were not related.

== Career statistics ==
=== Regular season and playoffs ===
			Regular season					Playoffs
Season	Team	League	GP	G	A	Pts	PIM	GP	G	A	Pts	PIM
1970–71	St. James Canadians	MJHL	47	7	22	29	98	—	—	—	—	—
1971–72	Winnipeg Jets	WCHL	61	1	16	17	138	—	—	—	—	—
1972–73	Winnipeg Jets	WCHL	63	10	43	53	161	—	—	—	—	—
1973–74	Winnipeg Clubs	WCHL	66	13	34	47	198	—	—	—	—	—
1974–75	Greensboro Generals	SHL	37	3	16	19	60	—	—	—	—	—
1974–75	Michigan Stags/Baltimore Blades	WHA	36	3	18	21	20	—	—	—	—	—
1975–76	Denver Spurs/Ottawa Civics	WHA	40	6	8	14	15	—	—	—	—	—
1975–76	Cleveland Crusaders	WHA	35	0	7	7	22	3	0	1	1	12
1976–77	Minnesota Fighting Saints	WHA	2	0	0	0	0	—	—	—	—	—
1976–77	Cincinnati Stingers	WHA	74	7	22	29	39	4	0	0	0	0
1977–78	Cincinnati Stingers	WHA	78	7	17	24	114	—	—	—	—	—
1978–79	Cincinnati Stingers	WHA	80	3	8	11	131	3	0	4	4	0
1979–80	Syracuse Firebirds	AHL	5	0	1	1	4	—	—	—	—	—
1979–80	Quebec Nordiques	NHL	31	0	3	3	18	—	—	—	—	—
1980–81	Tulsa Oilers	CHL	25	2	4	6	88	—	—	—	—	—
1980–81	Winnipeg Jets	NHL	38	0	6	6	69	—	—	—	—	—
1981–82	Tulsa Oilers	CHL	1	0	1	1	0	—	—	—	—	—
1981–82	Winnipeg Jets	NHL	38	1	2	3	57	—	—	—	—	—
WHA totals			345	26	80	106	341	10	0	5	5	12
NHL totals			107	1	11	12	144	—	—	—	—	—
