= Waterloo Memorial Arena =

Demolished arena in Waterloo, Ontario

Coordinates: 43.46539°N 80.52795°W

The Waterloo Memorial Arena was an arena located in Waterloo, Ontario, Canada. It was built in 1947 and primarily used by the Waterloo Siskins junior B hockey team, although it was also once briefly home to the Waterloo Hurricanes major junior team in the Ontario Hockey League.

The arena's roof was deemed structurally unsafe in 1987 and much of the building was demolished, although the grandstands, ice surface, and front facade and dressing rooms remained. The ice was then enclosed in an inflatable vinyl bubble. The arena was made redundant by the 1993 opening of the Waterloo Recreation Complex, although it stayed open until 2001, when it was finally torn down. The Perimeter Institute for Theoretical Physics currently occupies the site.

== History ==
Plans for an arena in the downtown area were completed by 1938, with funding of $70,000 arranged through a debenture and subscriptions and donations. The selected location was a former garbage dump near Silver Lake.

After the start of the Second World War in 1939, however, plans for the Waterloo Civic Auditorium were shelved and money returned to donors. It was not until August 1945, that council agreed to proceed again, starting by issuing a $50,000 debenture. A contractor from Preston (now Cambridge, Ontario), N. O. Hipel Company, was retained; work on the structure began in May 1946, and was completed in less than a year. The cost exceeded estimates, and totaled roughly $150,000, including the equipment. In addition to use by the public for skating in 1947, the arena was the home of the Intermediate B Waterloo McPhail's, the Waterloo Kent Junior C team, and the Waterloo Tigers. In the early 1950s, the Waterloo Hurricanes began to play there but lasted only two seasons. In later years, the arena was home to the Waterloo Siskins; the Kitchener Rangers played there occasionally into the 1980s. The Siskins won the Sutherland Cup (Ontario Hockey Association Junior B Champions) on 12 occasions, most recently in 2018-19 (of course, they had moved to the rec-complex after the arena was demolished).

In 1963, the facility, now named Waterloo Memorial Arena, required remedial work to stabilize the subsoil. By May 1987, the building was deemed structurally unsound and closed. The walls and roof were removed and an air-supported dome was installed, allowing the arena to be used for over a decade, finally being closed and demolished in spring 2001. By that time, the much larger, nearby Waterloo Recreation Complex had been in use for eight years; it was renamed in 2002, and has since been called the Waterloo Memorial Recreation Complex. After the arena was demolished, the Perimeter Institute for Theoretical Physics was built at that location.
