= Jacques Blain =

Canadian ice hockey player

- Born: July 19, 1947 (age 78) Gatineau, Quebec, Canada
- Height: 5 ft 11 in (180 cm)
- Weight: 180 lb (82 kg; 12 st 12 lb)
- Position: Defence
- Shot: Left
- Played for: WHA; Quebec Nordiques; WHL; Vancouver Canucks; CPHL; Tulsa Oilers; EHL; Syracuse Blazers; Long Island Ducks; NAHL; Maine Nordiques; Beauce Jaros; SHL; Greensboro Generals
- NHL draft: Undrafted
- Playing career: 1968–1977

Jacques "Jim" Blain (born July 19, 1947) is a Canadian former professional ice hockey defenceman.

During the 1972–73 season, Blain played 70 games in the World Hockey Association with the Quebec Nordiques.

== Career statistics ==
=== Regular season and playoffs ===
			Regular season					Playoffs
Season	Team	League	GP	G	A	Pts	PIM	GP	G	A	Pts	PIM
1965–66	London Nationals	OHA	4	0	1	1	0	––	––	––	––	––
1966–67	London Nationals	OHA	12	1	0	1	2	––	––	––	––	––
1966–67	Toronto Marlboros	OHA	33	0	4	4	10	––	––	––	––	––
1967–68	Ottawa 67's	OHA	12	0	5	5	27	––	––	––	––	––
1967–68	Niagara Falls Flyers	OHA	33	2	7	9	52	––	––	––	––	––
1968–69	Vancouver Canucks	WHL	3	0	0	0	0	––	––	––	––	––
1968–69	Tulsa Oilers	CHL	15	1	3	4	6	3	0	0	0	2
1968–69	Syracuse Blazers	EHL	35	3	11	14	45	––	––	––	––	––
1969–70	Long Island Ducks	EHL	44	3	20	23	41	––	––	––	––	––
1970–71	Long Island Ducks	EHL	74	18	48	66	48	––	––	––	––	––
1971–72	Long Island Ducks	EHL	75	10	41	51	58	––	––	––	––	––
1972–73	Quebec Nordiques	WHA	70	1	10	11	78	––	––	––	––	––
1973–74	Maine Nordiques	NAHL	72	12	49	61	57	8	1	7	8	4
1974–75	Maine Nordiques	NAHL	63	10	32	42	40	––	––	––	––	––
1974–75	Greensboro Generals	SHL	7	0	1	1	2	––	––	––	––	––
1975–76	Maine Nordiques	NAHL	60	13	25	38	44	––	––	––	––	––
1976–77	Beauce Jaros	NAHL	23	2	4	6	22	––	––	––	––	––
WHA totals			70	1	10	11	78	—	—	—	—	—
