= Gary Sittler =

Canadian ice hockey player

- Born: March 14, 1952 St. Jacobs, Ontario, Canada
- Died: February 24, 2015 (aged 62) Fort Nelson, British Columbia, Canada
- Height: 6 ft 1 in (185 cm)
- Weight: 190 lb (86 kg; 13 st 8 lb)
- Position: Defence
- Shot: Left
- Played for: WHA; Michigan Stags/Baltimore Blades; IHL; Saginaw Gears
- NHL draft: Undrafted
- Playing career: 1972–1978

Gary Sittler (March 14, 1952 – February 24, 2015) was a Canadian professional ice hockey defenceman.

During the 1974–75 season, Sittler played five games in the World Hockey Association with the Michigan Stags/Baltimore Blades.

== Family ==
He was the younger brother of the Hockey Hall of Famer Darryl Sittler.

== Career statistics ==
=== Regular season and playoffs ===
			Regular season					Playoffs
Season	Team	League	GP	G	A	Pts	PIM	GP	G	A	Pts	PIM
1969–70	London Knights	OHA	18	0	0	0	73	—	—	—	—	—
1969–70	London Squires	WJBHL	Statistics Unavailable
1970–71	London Knights	OHA	14	1	1	2	48	—	—	—	—	—
1971–72	Guelph C.M.C.'s	SOJHL	19	4	8	12	0	—	—	—	—	—
1971–72	London Knights	OHA	34	1	6	7	114	—	—	—	—	—
1972–73	Jersey-Suncoast	EHL	36	2	13	15	141	5	0	3	3	15
1973–74	Syracuse Blazers	NAHL	74	4	30	34	299	15	1	8	9	48
1974–75	Syracuse Blazers	NAHL	71	9	37	46	262	7	0	4	4	14
1974–75	Michigan Stags/Baltimore Blades	WHA	5	1	1	2	14	—	—	—	—	—
1975–76	Saginaw Gears	IHL	78	4	40	44	376	12	1	3	4	68
1976–77	Syracuse Blazers	NAHL	71	9	38	47	191	9	4	7	11	10
1976–77	Saginaw Gears	IHL	—	—	—	—	—	12	1	16	17	68
1977–78	Saginaw Gears	IHL	78	11	31	42	151	5	2	4	6	2
WHA totals			5	1	1	1	14	—	—	—	—	—
