= Gordon Tumilson =

Canadian ice hockey player

- Born: July 17, 1951 (age 75) Winnipeg, Manitoba, Canada
- Height: 5 ft 8 in (173 cm)
- Weight: 160 lb (73 kg; 11 st 6 lb)
- Position: Goaltender
- Caught: Left
- Played for: WHA; Winnipeg Jets; SHL; Greensboro Generals
- NHL draft: Undrafted
- Playing career: 1972–1974

Gordon Tumilson (born July 17, 1951) is a Canadian former professional ice hockey goaltender.

During the 1972–73 season, Tumilson played three games in the World Hockey Association (WHA) with the Winnipeg Jets.

== Career statistics ==
=== Regular season and playoffs ===
			Regular season									Playoffs
Season	Team	League	GP	W	L	T	MIN	GA	SO	GAA	SV%	GP	W	L	MIN	GA	SO	GAA	SV%
1970–71	West Kildonan North Stars	MJHL	43	—	—	—	2270	142	0	3.75	.894	—	—	—	—	—	—	—	—
1971–72	St. Boniface Mohawks	CCHL	0	—	—	—	—	—	—	—	—	—	—	—	—	—	—	—	—
1972–73	Winnipeg Jets	WHA	3	0	2	0	138	10	0	4.35	.846	—	—	—	—	—	—	—	—
1973–74	Greensboro Generals	SHL	11	5	5	0	627	43	0	4.12	.892	3	—	—	—	—	—	—	—
WHA totals			3	0	2	0	138	10	0	4.35	.846	—	—	—	—	—	—	—	—
