= Don Carter (ice hockey) =

Canadian ice hockey player (1936–2024)

- Born: February 24, 1936; Toronto, Ontario, Canada
- Died: November 15, 2024 (aged 88); Stratford, Ontario, Canada
- Height: 5 ft 11 in (180 cm)
- Weight: 185 lb (84 kg; 13 st 3 lb)
- Position: Right wing
- Shot: Right
- Played for: Greensboro Generals
- Playing career: 1953–1975

Don Carter (February 24, 1936 – November 15, 2024) was a Canadian professional hockey winger who played 639 games in the Eastern Hockey League with the Greensboro Generals from 1959 to 1973. Carter died in Stratford, Ontario on November 15, 2024, at the age of 86.
