= Waterloo Hurricanes =

Canadian junior ice hockey team (1950–1952)

- City: Waterloo, Ontario
- League: Ontario Hockey Association
- Operated: 1950–1952
- Home arena: Waterloo Memorial Arena
- Parent club: Boston Bruins

The Waterloo Hurricanes were a Canadian junior ice hockey team playing in the Ontario Hockey Association in the 1950–51 and 1951–52 seasons. They were based in Waterloo, Ontario, and played home games at the Waterloo Memorial Arena.

== History ==
The Hurricanes were established in 1950, and played home games at the Waterloo Memorial Arena. As a farm team of the Boston Bruins, they were second in priority to the Barrie Flyers for receiving talented prospects. Referred to locally as the "Hurcs", the Hurricanes were coached by Bob Kinnear and managed by Jim McCormick, did their own recruitment and scouting, and were composed of mostly rookie players with only three prospects assigned from the Bruins. In their first season, the Hurricanes played their inaugural game versys the defending champions in a 5–4 loss to the Guelph Biltmores, and finished near the bottom of the standings. Although the Hurricanes won their final regular season game by a 10–3 score versus the Toronto St. Michael's Majors, they finished in last place and did not qualify for the playoffs.

The Hurricanes returned for a second season coached by Kinnear, who also managed the Waterloo junior B team. Waterloo expected to benefit from the addition of the Kitchener Greenshirts to the OHA junior A division, since the neighbouring cities had a rivalry. The Greenshirts were affiliated with the Montreal Canadiens. Before the season, the Hurricanes alleged that the Canadiens tampered with Ron Attwell who was chosen in the OHA player draft by the Hurricanes, signed to a contract and placed on the Bruins' reserve list. Montreal claimed that the Hurricanes unfairly pressured Attwell into signing an OHA draft card which was not recognized in Quebec. Although NHL president Clarence Campbell ruled that the Hurricanes had the player's rights, Atwell joined the Montreal Junior Canadiens and never played in the OHA. In the first game played between the Hurricanes and Greenshirts, Kitchener earned a 4–1 victory. Losing approximately CA$40,000 in two seasons of operation, the Hurricanes folded in 1952 and sold seven players to the Oshawa Generals who were also supported by the Bruins.

== Notable players ==
Two Hurricanes' alumni played in the National Hockey League (NHL): goaltender Norm Defelice played 10 games with the Bruins, and defenceman Warren Godfrey played 15 fifteen seasons in the NHL with the Bruins and Detroit Red Wings. Alumnus Jim Connelly played for the Canada men's national ice hockey team at the 1960 Winter Olympics.

== Season-by-season results ==
Regular season results:

Legend: GP = Games played, W = Wins, L = Losses, T = Ties, Pts = Points, GF = Goals for, GA = Goals against

Season	Regular season									Playoffs
Season	GP	W	L	T	Pts	Pct	GF	GA	Finish	Playoffs
1950–51	54	7	44	3	17	0.137	163	339	10th OHA	Did not qualify
1951–52	53	15	37	1	31	0.288	215	363	8th OHA	Did not qualify
