= Steve Self =

Canadian ice hockey player

- Born: May 9, 1950 (age 74); Peterborough, Ontario, Canada
- Height: 5 ft 9 in (175 cm)
- Weight: 170 lb (77 kg; 12 st 2 lb)
- Position: Right wing
- Shot: Left
- Played for: Washington Capitals
- Playing career: 1972–1977

Stephen Self (born May 9, 1950) is a Canadian retired ice hockey forward. He played three games in the National Hockey League for the Washington Capitals during the 1976–77 season. The rest of his career, which lasted from 1972 to 1977, was spent in the minor leagues.

== Career statistics ==
=== Regular season and playoffs ===
			Regular season					Playoffs
Season	Team	League	GP	G	A	Pts	PIM	GP	G	A	Pts	PIM
1971–72	Colby College	ECAC 2	20	29	28	57	—	—	—	—	—	—
1972–73	Greensboro Generals	EHL	77	50	40	90	92	7	2	2	4	0
1973–74	Greensboro Generals	SHL	11	5	4	9	19	—	—	—	—	—
1973–74	Dayton Gems	IHL	51	23	22	45	48	4	4	4	8	0
1974–75	Dayton Gems	IHL	74	56	47	103	77	14	7	7	14	6
1975–76	Dayton Gems	IHL	78	36	37	73	91	15	10	8	18	8
1976–77	Washington Capitals	NHL	3	0	0	0	0	—	—	—	—	—
1976–77	Dayton Gems	IHL	78	44	41	85	33	4	0	1	1	0
IHL totals			281	159	147	306	249	37	21	20	41	14
NHL totals			3	0	0	0	0	—	—	—	—	—
