= Norm Defelice =

Canadian ice hockey player

- Born: January 19, 1933; Schumacher, Ontario, Canada
- Died: September 27, 2015 (aged 82); St. Catharines, Ontario, Canada
- Height: 5 ft 10 in (178 cm)
- Weight: 150 lb (68 kg; 10 st 10 lb)
- Position: Goaltender
- Caught: Left
- Played for: Boston Bruins
- Playing career: 1953–1970

Norman "Norm" Defelice (January 19, 1933 – September 27, 2015) was a Canadian ice hockey goaltender. He played 10 games for the Boston Bruins of the National Hockey League during the 1956–57 season. The rest of his career, which lasted from 1953 to 1970, was spent in various minor leagues. He became coach with Galt Hornets and Buffalo Blades in the 1970s before retiring from hockey.

== Career statistics ==
=== Regular season and playoffs ===
			Regular season									Playoffs
Season	Team	League	GP	W	L	T	MIN	GA	SO	GAA	SV%	GP	W	L	MIN	GA	SO	GAA	SV%
1951–52	Waterloo Hurricanes	OHA	18	—	—	—	1050	138	0	7.89	—	—	—	—	—	—	—	—	—
1952–53	St. Catharines Teepees	OHA	20	—	—	—	1200	55	2	2.75	—	2	—	—	120	8	0	4.00	—
1953–54	Sydney Millionaires	MMHL	69	35	30	3	4182	236	7	3.39	—	12	5	7	730	35	1	2.88	—
1953–54	Hershey Bears	AHL	1	0	1	0	60	4	0	4.00	—	—	—	—	—	—	—	—	—
1954–55	Johnstown Jets	IHL	37	—	—	—	2220	122	0	3.30	—	—	—	—	—	—	—	—	—
1954–55	Hershey Bears	AHL	21	9	11	1	1260	82	1	3.90	—	—	—	—	—	—	—	—	—
1954–55	Toledo Mercurys	IHL	4	—	—	—	240	21	0	5.25	—	—	—	—	—	—	—	—	—
1954–55	Washington Lions	EHL	1	1	0	0	60	5	0	5.00	—	—	—	—	—	—	—	—	—
1955–56	Hershey Bears	AHL	22	7	13	2	1320	91	0	4.14	—	—	—	—	—	—	—	—	—
1955–56	Washington Lions	EHL	4	—	—	—	240	12	0	3.00	—	—	—	—	—	—	—	—	—
1956–57	Boston Bruins	NHL	10	3	5	2	600	30	0	3.00	.894	—	—	—	—	—	—	—	—
1956–57	Springfield Indians	AHL	8	1	6	1	500	38	0	4.56	—	—	—	—	—	—	—	—	—
1957–58	Clinton Comets	EHL	45	—	—	—	2700	162	1	3.60	—	—	—	—	—	—	—	—	—
1957–58	Trois-Rivieres Lions	QHL	2	0	2	0	120	10	0	5.00	—	—	—	—	—	—	—	—	—
1957–58	Charlotte Checkers	EHL	1	0	1	0	60	8	0	8.00	—	—	—	—	—	—	—	—	—
1957–58	Washington Presidents	EHL	—	—	—	—	—	—	—	—	—	12	8	4	720	32	1	2.67	—
1958–59	Clinton Comets	EHL	63	41	20	2	3780	177	3	2.82	—	8	8	0	480	18	1	2.25	—
1959–60	Clinton Comets	EHL	37	—	—	—	2220	97	4	2.62	—	8	3	5	480	23	0	2.88	—
1959–60	Greensboro Generals	EHL	1	1	0	0	60	4	0	4.00	—	—	—	—	—	—	—	—	—
1960–61	Clinton Comets	EHL	60	29	29	2	3600	220	6	3.49	—	4	1	3	240	15	0	3.75	—
1961–62	Clinton Comets	EHL	68	45	22	1	4080	193	5	2.99	—	6	1	5	360	22	0	3.65	—
1962–63	Clinton Comets	EHL	63	36	21	6	3780	163	8	2.59	—	13	8	5	780	45	0	3.23	—
1963–64	Clinton Comets	EHL	66	35	24	7	3960	193	8	2.92	—	12	7	5	730	45	1	3.70	—
1964–65	Clinton Comets	EHL	69	—	—	—	4140	164	15	2.38	—	11	5	6	670	32	0	2.86	—
1965–66	Jersey Devils	EHL	62	—	—	—	3720	239	1	3.85	—	—	—	—	—	—	—	—	—
1965–66	Long Island Ducks	EHL	3	2	1	0	180	6	0	2.00	—	—	—	—	—	—	—	—	—
1966–67	Jersey Devils	EHL	52	—	—	—	3120	146	0	2.81	—	9	5	4	540	29	0	3.22	—
1967–68	Galt Hornets	OHA Sr	29	—	—	—	1740	62	5	2.14	—	—	—	—	—	—	—	—	—
1968–69	Long Island Ducks	EHL	23	—	—	—	1380	75	1	3.26	—	—	—	—	—	—	—	—	—
1969–70	Galt Hornets	OHA Sr	13	—	—	—	780	32	1	2.46	—	—	—	—	—	—	—	—	—
NHL totals			10	3	5	2	600	30	0	3.00	.894	—	—	—	—	—	—	—	—
