= Paul Curtis (ice hockey) =

Canadian ice hockey player

- Born: September 29, 1947 (age 78) Peterborough, Ontario, Canada
- Height: 6 ft 0 in (183 cm)
- Weight: 185 lb (84 kg; 13 st 3 lb)
- Position: Defence
- Shot: Left
- Played for: Montreal Canadiens; St. Louis Blues; Los Angeles Kings; Michigan Stags/Baltimore Blades
- Playing career: 1967–1976

Paul Edwin Curtis (born September 29, 1947) is a Canadian former professional ice hockey defenceman who played 185 games in the National Hockey League for the Montreal Canadiens, St. Louis Blues, and Los Angeles Kings between 1969 and 1973. He would also play 76 games in the World Hockey Association with the Michigan Stags/Baltimore Blades during the 1974–75 season

== Career statistics ==
=== Regular season and playoffs ===
			Regular season					Playoffs
Season	Team	League	GP	G	A	Pts	PIM	GP	G	A	Pts	PIM
1963–64	Peterborough T.P.T.'s	OHA	2	0	1	1	7	1	0	0	0	4
1964–65	Peterborough T.P.T.'s	OHA	56	0	7	7	90	12	0	2	2	10
1965–66	Peterborough T.P.T.'s	OHA	48	3	17	20	116	6	1	1	2	9
1966–67	Peterborough Petes	OHA	44	2	8	10	91	6	1	2	3	2
1967–68	Houston Apollos	CHL	62	1	8	9	150	—	—	—	—	—
1968–69	Houston Apollos	CHL	70	3	27	30	72	3	0	0	0	0
1969–70	Montreal Canadiens	NHL	1	0	0	0	0	—	—	—	—	—
1969–70	Montreal Voyageurs	AHL	69	3	27	30	52	8	0	5	5	4
1970–71	Los Angeles Kings	NHL	64	1	13	14	82	—	—	—	—	—
1971–72	Los Angeles Kings	NHL	64	1	12	13	57	—	—	—	—	—
1972–73	Los Angeles Kings	NHL	27	0	5	5	16	—	—	—	—	—
1972–73	St. Louis Blues	NHL	29	1	4	5	6	5	0	0	0	2
1973–74	Cincinnati Swords	AHL	42	1	7	8	33	—	—	—	—	—
1973–74	Providence Reds	AHL	24	2	14	16	4	15	5	8	13	22
1974–75	Michigan Stags/Baltimore Blades	WHA	76	4	15	19	32	—	—	—	—	—
1975–76	Baltimore Clippers	AHL	54	2	8	10	33	—	—	—	—	—
WHA totals			76	4	15	19	32	—	—	—	—	—
NHL totals			185	3	34	37	161	5	0	0	0	2
