= Craig Hanmer =

American ice hockey player

- Born: January 6, 1956 Saint Paul, MN, USA
- Died: January 2, 2011 (aged 54)
- Height: 6 ft 1 in (185 cm)
- Weight: 205 lb (93 kg; 14 st 9 lb)
- Position: Defense
- Shot: Left
- Played for: Indianapolis Racers
- NHL draft: 53rd overall, 1976; Philadelphia Flyers
- WHA draft: 17th overall, 1974; Indianapolis Racers
- Playing career: 1974–1977

Craig W. Hanmer (January 6, 1956 – January 2, 2011) was an American professional ice hockey player who played in the World Hockey Association (WHA). He played 27 games with the Indianapolis Racers during the 1974–75 WHA season after being drafted by the Racers in the second round, 17th overall, of the 1974 WHA Amateur Draft. He was also drafted in the third round, 53rd overall, of the 1976 NHL Amateur Draft by the Philadelphia Flyers.

== Career statistics ==
			Regular season					Playoffs
Season	Team	League	GP	G	A	Pts	PIM	GP	G	A	Pts	PIM
1974–75	Indianapolis Racers	WHA	27	1	0	1	15	—	—	—	—	—
1974–75	Mohawk Valley Comets	NAHL	29	0	8	8	43	4	0	2	2	0
1975–76	Mohawk Valley Comets	NAHL	17	0	2	2	57	—	—	—	—	—
1976–77	Springfield Indians	AHL	9	0	1	1	60	—	—	—	—	—
WHA totals			27	1	0	1	15	—	—	—	—	—
