= Steve Richardson (ice hockey) =

Canadian ice hockey player

- Born: May 4, 1949 (age 75); Olds, Alberta, Canada
- Height: 6 ft 1 in (185 cm)
- Weight: 185 lb (84 kg; 13 st 3 lb)
- Position: Left wing
- Shot: Left
- Played for: Indianapolis Racers; Michigan Stags; Baltimore Blades; New England Whalers
- NHL draft: Undrafted
- Playing career: 1972–1979

Steve Richardson (born May 4, 1949) is a Canadian former professional ice hockey winger who played in the World Hockey Association (WHA). Richardson played parts of two WHA seasons with the Indianapolis Racers, Michigan Stags, and New England Whalers.

== Career statistics ==
			Regular season					Playoffs
Season	Team	League	GP	G	A	Pts	PIM	GP	G	A	Pts	PIM
1972–73	Cincinnati Swords	AHL	74	24	35	59	61	15	6	8	14	12
1973–74	Cincinnati Swords	AHL	63	13	29	42	58	5	0	0	0	8
1974–75	Syracuse Blazers	NAHL	4	1	1	2	0	—	—	—	—	—
1974–75	Greensboro Generals	SHL	4	6	3	9	0	—	—	—	—	—
1974–75	Indianapolis Racers	WHA	19	1	4	5	16	—	—	—	—	—
1974–75	Michigan Stags/Baltimore Blades	WHA	47	8	18	26	58	—	—	—	—	—
1975–76	Cape Codders	NAHL	29	15	18	33	31	—	—	—	—	—
1975–76	New England Whalers	WHA	6	0	0	0	0	—	—	—	—	—
1977–78	Drumheller Miners	ASHL	9	1	6	7	10	—	—	—	—	—
WHA totals			72	9	22	31	74	—	—	—	—	—
