= Ed Johnstone =

Canadian ice hockey player

- Born: March 2, 1954 (age 72) Brandon, Manitoba, Canada
- Height: 5 ft 9 in (175 cm)
- Weight: 175 lb (79 kg; 12 st 7 lb)
- Position: Right wing
- Shot: Right
- Played for: Michigan Stags; Baltimore Blades; New York Rangers; Detroit Red Wings
- NHL draft: 104th overall, 1974; New York Rangers
- WHA draft: 78th overall, 1974; Michigan Stags
- Playing career: 1974–1987

Edward Lavern "Eddie" Johnstone (born March 2, 1954) is a Canadian former professional ice hockey player. He played for the Michigan Stags/Baltimore Blades in the World Hockey Association (WHA), followed by parts of ten seasons in the National Hockey League (NHL) with the New York Rangers and Detroit Red Wings. He featured in the 1979 Stanley Cup Final with the Rangers.

Johnstone was born in Brandon, Manitoba, but grew up in Vernon, British Columbia.

== Playing career ==
Johnstone played major junior with the Medicine Hat Tigers of the Western Canada Hockey League from 1971 to 1974. After two consecutive 100 point seasons with Medicine Hat, Johnstone was drafted 104th overall by the New York Rangers in the 1974 NHL amateur draft, and 78th overall by the Michigan Stags in the 1974 WHA Amateur Draft. He played 23 games for the Stags in 1974–75 and played in the American Hockey League (AHL) for the Providence Reds. Johnstone started his National Hockey League career in 1975–76, scoring 3 points in 10 games. Johnstone played for the Rangers until the end of the 1982–83 season, before being traded to the Detroit Red Wings along with Ron Duguay and Eddie Mio for Mike Blaisdell, Willie Huber, and Mark Osborne. He played for the Red Wings and their AHL affiliate, the Adirondack Red Wings before retiring in 1987.

== Awards and achievements ==
- Named to the AHL First All-Star Team in 1977.
- Played in NHL All-Star Game (1981)
- In the 2009 book 100 Ranger Greats, was ranked No. 65 all-time of the 901 New York Rangers who had played during the team's first 82 seasons

== Career statistics ==
=== Regular season and playoffs ===
			Regular season					Playoffs
Season	Team	League	GP	G	A	Pts	PIM	GP	G	A	Pts	PIM
1970–71	Vernon Essos	BCHL	50	45	49	94	79	—	—	—	—	—
1971–72	Vernon Essos	BCHL	—	—	—	—	—	—	—	—	—	—
1971–72	Medicine Hat Tigers	WCHL	27	14	15	29	46	7	2	2	4	6
1972–73	Medicine Hat Tigers	WCHL	68	58	44	102	70	17	13	10	23	21
1972–73	Medicine Hat Tigers	MC	—	—	—	—	—	2	3	0	3	0
1973–74	Medicine Hat Tigers	WCHL	68	64	54	118	164	5	5	0	5	10
1974–75	Greensboro Generals	SHL	25	21	25	46	21	—	—	—	—	—
1974–75	Michigan Stags/Baltimore Blades	WHA	23	4	4	8	43	—	—	—	—	—
1975–76	Providence Reds	AHL	58	23	33	56	102	3	0	0	0	14
1975–76	New York Rangers	NHL	10	2	1	3	4	—	—	—	—	—
1976–77	New Haven Nighthawks	AHL	80	40	58	98	79	6	3	6	9	7
1977–78	New Haven Nighthawks	AHL	17	10	12	22	20	—	—	—	—	—
1977–78	New York Rangers	NHL	53	13	13	26	44	—	—	—	—	—
1978–79	New York Rangers	NHL	30	5	3	8	27	17	5	0	5	10
1979–80	New York Rangers	NHL	78	14	21	35	60	9	0	1	1	25
1980–81	New York Rangers	NHL	80	30	38	68	100	8	2	2	4	4
1981–82	New York Rangers	NHL	68	30	28	58	57	10	2	6	8	25
1982–83	New York Rangers	NHL	52	15	21	36	27	9	4	1	5	19
1983–84	Detroit Red Wings	NHL	46	12	11	23	54	2	0	0	0	0
1984–85	Adirondack Red Wings	AHL	69	27	28	55	70	—	—	—	—	—
1985–86	Adirondack Red Wings	AHL	62	29	31	60	74	17	5	7	12	4
1985–86	Detroit Red Wings	NHL	3	1	0	1	2	—	—	—	—	—
1986–87	Adirondack Red Wings	AHL	61	30	22	52	83	5	1	0	1	2
1986–87	Detroit Red Wings	NHL	6	0	0	0	0	—	—	—	—	—
WHA totals			23	4	4	8	43	—	—	—	—	—
NHL totals			426	122	136	258	375	55	13	10	23	83

Preceded by Steve Carlson	Head coaches of the Johnstown Chiefs; 1992-1995	Succeeded by Nick Fotiu
