= Randy Legge =

Canadian ice hockey player (1945–2023)

- Born: December 16, 1945 Newmarket, Ontario, Canada
- Died: December 11, 2023 (aged 77)
- Height: 5 ft 11 in (180 cm)
- Weight: 184 lb (83 kg; 13 st 2 lb)
- Position: Defence
- Shot: Right
- Played for: New York Rangers; Michigan Stags/Baltimore Blades; Winnipeg Jets; Cleveland Crusaders; San Diego Mariners
- Playing career: 1966–1977

Norman Randall Legge (December 16, 1945 – December 11, 2023) was a Canadian professional ice hockey defenceman. He played 12 games in the National Hockey League for the New York Rangers during the 1972–73 season. He also played 192 games in the World Hockey Association with the Michigan Stags/Baltimore Blades, Winnipeg Jets, Cleveland Crusaders, and San Diego Mariners from 1974 to 1977. Legge died on December 11, 2023, at the age of 77.

== Career statistics ==
=== Regular season and playoffs ===
			Regular season					Playoffs
Season	Team	League	GP	G	A	Pts	PIM	GP	G	A	Pts	PIM
1962–63	Guelph Royals	OHA-B	48	2	4	6	44	—	—	—	—	—
1963–64	Kitchener Rangers	OHA	56	6	6	12	150	—	—	—	—	—
1964–65	Kitchener Rangers	OHA	42	3	12	15	103	—	—	—	—	—
1965–66	Kitchener Rangers	OHA	47	5	24	29	155	19	0	3	3	41
1966–67	Fort Wayne Komets	IHL	72	8	40	48	170	11	1	6	7	19
1967–68	Omaha Knights	CHL	61	2	17	19	148	—	—	—	—	—
1968–69	Omaha Knights	CHL	8	1	3	4	22	—	—	—	—	—
1968–69	Buffalo Bisons	AHL	57	1	15	16	66	6	0	0	0	4
1969–70	Buffalo Bisons	AHL	72	0	18	18	161	14	0	3	3	30
1970–71	Seattle Totems	WHL	72	4	17	21	150	—	—	—	—	—
1971–72	Providence Reds	AHL	71	2	7	9	73	5	1	1	2	6
1972–73	New York Rangers	NHL	12	0	2	2	2	—	—	—	—	—
1972–73	Providence Reds	AHL	61	3	19	22	126	4	1	1	2	2
1973–74	Providence Reds	AHL	75	4	21	25	121	15	0	4	4	9
1974–75	Michigan Stags/Baltimore Blades	WHA	78	1	14	15	69	—	—	—	—	—
1975–76	Winnipeg Jets	WHA	1	0	0	0	0	—	—	—	—	—
1975–76	Cleveland Crusaders	WHA	44	1	8	9	28	3	0	0	0	0
1975–76	Mohawk Valley Comets	NAHL	24	1	12	13	50	—	—	—	—	—
1976–77	San Diego Mariners	WHA	69	1	9	10	69	7	0	0	0	18
WHA totals			192	3	31	34	166	10	0	0	0	18
NHL totals			12	0	2	2	2	—	—	—	—	—
