= Gary Bredin =

Canadian ice hockey player

- Born: May 25, 1948 (age 78) Edmonton, Alberta, Canada
- Height: 6 ft 0 in (183 cm)
- Weight: 185 lb (84 kg; 13 st 3 lb)
- Position: Right wing
- Shot: Right
- Played for: WHA; Indianapolis Racers; Michigan Stags; Baltimore Blades; Denver Spurs; Ottawa Civics; San Diego Mariners; AHL; Rochester Americans; CHL; Fort Worth Wings
- NHL draft: Undrafted
- Playing career: 1969–1976

Gary Blaine Bredin (born May 25, 1948) is a Canadian retired professional ice hockey forward.

Bredin played in 144 games in the World Hockey Association with the Indianapolis Racers, Michigan Stags, Baltimore Blades, Denver Spurs, Ottawa Civics and San Diego Mariners.

== Career statistics ==
=== Regular season and playoffs ===
			Regular season					Playoffs
Season	Team	League	GP	G	A	Pts	PIM	GP	G	A	Pts	PIM
1966–67	Edmonton Oil Kings	CMJHL	55	15	21	36	0	––	––	––	––	––
1967–68	Edmonton–Moose Jaw	WCJHL	52	17	21	38	27	––	––	––	––	––
1968–69	Edmonton Oil Kings	WCHL	59	36	24	60	78	––	––	––	––	––
1969–70	Fort Worth Wings	CHL	62	9	11	20	44	7	2	1	3	2
1970–71	Fort Worth Wings	CHL	49	3	12	15	47	––	––	––	––	––
1971–72	Rochester Americans	AHL	64	9	9	18	28	––	––	––	––	––
1972–73	Seattle Totems	WHL	63	9	14	23	38	––	––	––	––	––
1973–74	Rochester Americans	AHL	76	26	24	50	63	5	1	0	1	2
1974–75	Indianapolis Racers	WHA	10	3	2	5	8	––	––	––	––	––
1974–75	Michigan Stags/Baltimore Blades	WHA	67	15	21	36	29	––	––	––	––	––
1975–76	Denver Spurs/Ottawa Civics	WHA	17	4	3	7	2	––	––	––	––	––
1975–76	San Diego Mariners	WHA	50	4	5	9	10	––	––	––	––	––
WHA totals			144	26	31	57	49	—	—	—	—	—
