= Gerry Desjardins =

Canadian former ice hockey goaltender

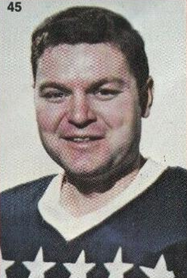
- Desjardins in 1970 sticker
- Born: July 22, 1944 (age 82) Sudbury, Ontario, Canada
- Height: 5 ft 11 in (180 cm)
- Weight: 180 lb (82 kg; 12 st 12 lb)
- Position: Goaltender
- Caught: Left
- Played for: Los Angeles Kings; Chicago Blackhawks; New York Islanders; Michigan Stags; Buffalo Sabres
- Playing career: 1965–1978

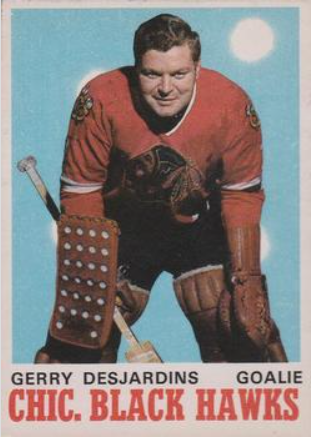
1970 Topps card of Gerry Desjardins for Chicago Black Hawks

Gerard Ferdinand Desjardins (born July 22, 1944) is a Canadian former ice hockey goaltender who played in the National Hockey League (NHL) for the Los Angeles Kings, Chicago Blackhawks, New York Islanders, and Buffalo Sabres, where in 1975-76 he set the team record for consecutive wins, at 9, which stood until 2026. Desjardins also played one season for the Michigan Stags in the World Hockey Association (WHA). Desjardins' career ended after a puck struck his mask, which was driven into his eye in 1977, which led many NHL goalies to switch from fibreglass facemasks toward the cage and helmet style. Many amateur and junior hockey leagues subsequently banned fibreglass masks altogether, and began mandating the helmet/cage combination.

== Awards and achievements ==
- Played in 1977 NHL All-Star Game.

== Career statistics ==
=== Regular season and playoffs ===
Bold indicates led league

			Regular season									Playoffs
Season	Team	League	GP	W	L	T	MIN	GA	SO	GAA	SV%	GP	W	L	MIN	GA	SO	GAA	SV%
1961–62	Sudbury Bell Telephone	NBHL	—	—	—	—	—	—	—	—	—	—	—	—	—	—	—	—	—
1962–63	Toronto Marlboros	OHA-Jr.	30	—	—	—	1780	97	2	3.27	—	—	—	—	—	—	—	—	—
1963–64	Garson Native Sons	NOJHA	—	—	—	—	—	—	—	—	—	—	—	—	—	—	—	—	—
1963–64	London Nationals	WOJHL	—	—	—	—	—	—	—	—	—	—	—	—	—	—	—	—	—
1964–65	Toronto Marlboros	OHA-Jr.	53	32	14	7	3180	202	1	3.81	—	19	—	—	1140	57	0	3.00	—
1965–66	Houston Apollos	CPHL	20	6	8	5	1160	73	0	3.78	—	—	—	—	—	—	—	—	—
1966–67	Houston Apollos	CPHL	36	15	16	5	2160	130	1	3.61	—	6	2	4	328	18	0	3.29	—
1967–68	Cleveland Barons	AHL	66	26	26	14	3934	226	3	3.45	—	—	—	—	—	—	—	—	—
1968–69	Los Angeles Kings	NHL	60	18	34	6	3499	190	4	3.26	.897	9	3	**4**	431	**28**	0	3.90	.861
1969–70	Los Angeles Kings	NHL	43	7	29	5	2453	159	3	3.89	.886	—	—	—	—	—	—	—	—
1969–70	Chicago Black Hawks	NHL	4	4	0	0	240	8	0	2.00	.943	—	—	—	—	—	—	—	—
1970–71	Chicago Black Hawks	NHL	22	12	6	3	1217	49	0	2.42	.919	—	—	—	—	—	—	—	—
1971–72	Chicago Black Hawks	NHL	6	1	2	3	360	21	0	3.50	.885	1	1	0	60	5	0	5.00	.853
1972–73	New York Islanders	NHL	44	5	**35**	3	2498	195	0	4.68	.866	—	—	—	—	—	—	—	—
1973–74	New York Islanders	NHL	36	9	17	6	1945	101	0	3.12	.902	—	—	—	—	—	—	—	—
1974–75	Michigan Stags	WHA	41	9	28	1	2282	162	0	4.26	.884	—	—	—	—	—	—	—	—
1974–75	Buffalo Sabres	NHL	9	6	2	1	540	25	0	2.78	.905	**15**	7	**5**	760	**43**	0	3.39	.863
1975–76	Buffalo Sabres	NHL	55	29	15	11	3280	161	2	2.95	.890	9	4	**5**	563	28	0	2.98	.881
1976–77	Buffalo Sabres	NHL	49	31	12	6	2871	126	3	2.63	.900	1	0	1	60	4	0	4.00	.810
1977–78	Buffalo Sabres	NHL	3	0	1	0	111	7	0	3.78	.781	—	—	—	—	—	—	—	—
NHL totals			331	122	153	44	19,014	1042	12	3.29	.892	35	15	15	1874	108	0	3.46	.866
WHA totals			41	9	28	1	2282	162	0	4.26	.884	—	—	—	—	—	—	—	—

"Desjardins's stats". The Goaltender Home Page.
