= 1970–71 AHL season =

- League: American Hockey League
- Sport: Ice hockey

Regular season
- F. G. "Teddy" Oke Trophy: Providence Reds
- Season MVP: Fred Speck
- Top scorer: Fred Speck

Playoffs
- Champions: Springfield Kings
- Runners-up: Providence Reds

AHL seasons
- 1969—70 1971–72

The 1970–71 AHL season was the 35th season of the American Hockey League. Eight teams played 72 games each in the schedule. The Baltimore Clippers finished first overall in the regular season. The Springfield Kings won their first Calder Cup championship, since being renamed from the Indians.

== Team changes ==
- The Buffalo Bisons cease operations, when the Buffalo Sabres joined the National Hockey League as an expansion team.

== Final standings ==
Note: GP = Games played; W = Wins; L = Losses; T = Ties; GF = Goals for; GA = Goals against; Pts = Points;

East	GP	W	L	T	Pts	GF	GA
Providence Reds (independent)	72	28	31	13	69	257	270
Montreal Voyageurs (MTL)	72	27	31	14	68	215	239
Springfield Kings^{†} (LAK)	72	29	35	8	66	244	281
Quebec Aces ^{†} (PHI)	72	25	31	16	66	211	240

West	GP	W	L	T	Pts	GF	GA
Baltimore Clippers (DET)	72	40	23	9	89	263	224
Cleveland Barons (independent)	72	39	26	7	85	272	208
Hershey Bears (BOS)	72	31	31	10	72	238	212
Rochester Americans (VAN)	72	25	36	11	61	222	248

^{†}The Springfield Kings defeated the Quebec Aces by a score of 4–3 in overtime in a one-game playoff to determine the last playoff spot in the East Division.

== Scoring leaders ==
Note: GP = Games played; G = Goals; A = Assists; Pts = Points; PIM = Penalty minutes

Player	Team	GP	G	A	Pts	PIM
Fred Speck	Baltimore Clippers	72	31	61	92	40
Marc Dufour	Baltimore Clippers	69	31	51	82	15
Norm Beaudin	Cleveland Barons	59	27	48	75	39
Wayne Rivers	Baltimore Clippers	65	38	37	75	66
Joey Johnston	Cleveland Barons	72	27	47	74	142
Joe Szura	Providence Reds	70	21	53	74	39
Bob Leiter	Hershey Bears	72	33	36	69	26
Don Blackburn	Rochester Americans	62	25	44	69	22
Doug Volmar	Springfield Kings	69	42	26	68	52

- complete list

== Calder Cup playoffs ==
Tiebreaker

- Springfield Kings defeated Quebec Aces 4–3 in overtime.

First round

- Providence Reds defeated Baltimore Clippers 4 games to 2.
- Springfield Kings defeated Montreal Voyageurs 3 games to 0.
- Cleveland Barons defeated Hershey Bears 3 games to 1.

Second round

- Providence Reds earned second round bye.
- Springfield Kings defeated Cleveland Barons 3 games to 1.

Finals

- Springfield Kings defeated Providence Reds 4 games to 0, to win the Calder Cup.
- list of scores

== Trophy and award winners ==
Team awards

Calder Cup; Playoff champions:	Springfield Kings
F. G. "Teddy" Oke Trophy; Regular Season champions, East Division:	Providence Reds
John D. Chick Trophy; Regular Season champions, West Division:	Baltimore Clippers

Individual awards

Les Cunningham Award; Most valuable player:	Fred Speck - Baltimore Clippers
John B. Sollenberger Trophy; Top point scorer:	Fred Speck - Baltimore Clippers
Dudley "Red" Garrett Memorial Award; Rookie of the year:	Fred Speck - Baltimore Clippers
Eddie Shore Award; Defenceman of the year:	Marshall Johnston - Cleveland Barons
Harry "Hap" Holmes Memorial Award; Lowest goals against average:	Gary Kurt - Cleveland Barons
Louis A.R. Pieri Memorial Award; Coach of the year:	Terry Reardon - Baltimore Clippers

Other awards

James C. Hendy Memorial Award; Most outstanding executive:	Jack A. Butterfield
James H. Ellery Memorial Award; Outstanding media coverage:	W.W. "Tiny" Parry, Hershey

== See also ==
- List of AHL seasons

Preceded by 1969–70 AHL season	AHL seasons	Succeeded by 1971–72 AHL season
