= Mike Jakubo (ice hockey) =

Canadian ice hockey player (1947–2019)

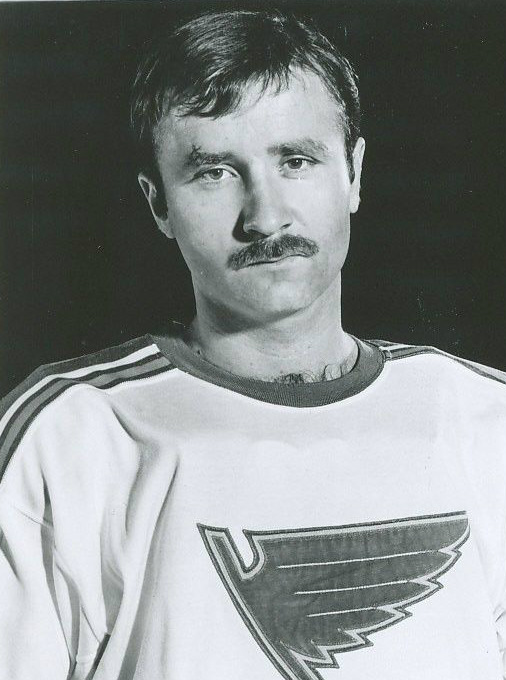
- St. Louis Blues 1973
- Born: July 7, 1947 Sudbury, Ontario, Canada
- Died: April 4, 2019 (aged 71) Sudbury, Ontario, Canada
- Height: 6 ft 0 in (183 cm)
- Weight: 190 lb (86 kg; 13 st 8 lb)
- Position: Left wing
- Shot: Left
- Played for: WHA; Los Angeles Sharks; IHL; Fort Wayne Komets; Columbus Golden Seals; Kalamazoo Wings; EHL; Greensboro Generals; AHL; Virginia Wings; WHL; Denver Spurs; SHL; Tidewater Sharks; Greensboro Generals
- NHL draft: Undrafted
- Playing career: 1970–1976

Michael Paul Jakubo (July 7, 1947 – April 4, 2019) was a Canadian professional ice hockey player.

During the 1972–73 season, Jakubo played seven games in the World Hockey Association with the Los Angeles Sharks. Jakubo was also a member of the independent London Lions team which played the 1973-74 season against the top European hockey teams. He died on April 4, 2019.

After his retirement from hockey, he worked for the municipal government in his hometown of Sudbury, Ontario. His son, Mike Jakubo, was a professional curler and served two terms on Greater Sudbury City Council from 2014 to 2022.

== Career statistics ==
=== Regular season and playoffs ===
			Regular season					Playoffs
Season	Team	League	GP	G	A	Pts	PIM	GP	G	A	Pts	PIM
1970–71	Fort Wayne Komets	IHL	66	18	32	50	94	5	1	4	5	9
1971–72	Fort Wayne Komets	IHL	10	1	1	2	8	—	—	—	—	—
1971–72	Columbus Golden Seals	IHL	49	22	21	43	37	—	—	—	—	—
1972–73	Greensboro Generals	EHL	62	31	46	77	118	4	2	5	7	2
1972–73	Los Angeles Sharks	WHA	7	0	0	0	0	—	—	—	—	—
1973–74	Virginia Red Wings	AHL	21	8	7	15	11	—	—	—	—	—
1973–74	London Lions	Ind	24	13	9	22	4	—	—	—	—	—
1973–74	Denver Spurs	WHL	29	10	3	13	35	—	—	—	—	—
1974–75	Virginia Red Wings	AHL	52	31	20	51	52	5	3	3	6	8
1975–76	Tidewater Sharks	SHL	12	1	3	4	20	—	—	—	—	—
1975–76	Greensboro Generals	SHL	31	15	12	27	14	—	—	—	—	—
WHA totals			7	0	0	0	0	—	—	—	—	—
