= Bill Reed =

Canadian ice hockey player

- Born: May 25, 1954 (age 72) Toronto, Ontario, Canada
- Height: 5 ft 11 in (180 cm)
- Weight: 190 lb (86 kg; 13 st 8 lb)
- Position: Defence
- Played for: Michigan Stags/Baltimore Blades; Calgary Cowboys
- NHL draft: 72nd overall, 1974; Boston Bruins
- WHA draft: 4th overall, 1974; Michigan Stags
- Playing career: 1974–1981

William Ernest Reed (born May 25, 1954) is a Canadian retired professional ice hockey defenceman. He was drafted in the fourth round, 72nd overall, by the Boston Bruins in the 1974 NHL entry draft.

Reed never played in the NHL, but did play 40 games in the World Hockey Association with the Michigan Stags/Baltimore Blades and Calgary Cowboys during the 1974–75 and 1975–76 WHA seasons.

As a youth, he played in the 1966 Quebec International Pee-Wee Hockey Tournament with the Toronto Faustina minor ice hockey team from.

Reed appeared as an extra in the movie Slap Shot. During the opening sequence Reed (wearing jersey #2) collides with a teammate wearing the #14 allowing the Charlestown Chiefs to score. The player Reed runs into was his real life Johnstown Jets teammate, Vern Campigatto.

== Career statistics ==
=== Regular season and playoffs ===
			Regular season					Playoffs
Season	Team	League	GP	G	A	Pts	PIM	GP	G	A	Pts	PIM
1971–72	Ohio State University	CCHA	––	5	7	12	26	––	––	––	––	––
1972–73	Soo Greyhounds	OHA	50	12	24	36	98	––	––	––	––	––
1973–74	Soo Greyhounds	OHA	63	13	43	56	240	––	––	––	––	––
1974–75	Syracuse Blazers	NAHL	32	3	6	9	40	7	0	0	0	2
1974–75	Michigan Stags/Baltimore Blades	WHA	11	0	0	0	12	––	––	––	––	––
1975–76	Calgary Cowboys	WHA	29	0	5	5	14	––	––	––	––	––
1975–76	Springfield Indians	AHL	4	0	1	1	18	––	––	––	––	––
1975–76	Johnstown Jets	NAHL	28	3	19	22	47	9	1	6	7	12
1977–78	San Diego Mariners	PHL	22	0	5	5	31	––	––	––	––	––
1977–78	Drumheller Miners	ASHL	7	2	0	2	0	––	––	––	––	––
1978–79	Welland Steelers	OHASr	Statistics Unavailable
1980–81	Dundas Merchants	OHASr	Statistics Unavailable
1981–82	Dundas Merchants	OHASr	Statistics Unavailable
WHA totals			40	0	5	5	26	—	—	—	—	—
