= Mike Conroy (ice hockey) =

Canadian ice hockey player

- Born: August 28, 1950 (age 75) North Bay, Ontario, Canada
- Height: 6 ft 0 in (183 cm)
- Weight: 194 lb (88 kg; 13 st 12 lb)
- Position: Centre
- Shot: Right
- Played for: Cleveland Crusaders (WHA)
- NHL draft: Undrafted
- Playing career: 1973–1977

Mike Conroy (born August 28, 1950) is a Canadian former professional ice hockey player. During the 1975–76 season, Conroy played four games in the World Hockey Association with the Cleveland Crusaders.

== Career statistics ==
=== Regular season and playoffs ===
| | | | Regular season | | | | | Playoffs |
| Season | Team | League | GP | G | A | Pts | PIM | GP | G | A | Pts | PIM |
|---|---|---|---|---|---|---|---|---|---|---|---|---|
| 1970–71 | Clarkson University | ECAC | Statistics Unavailable |
| 1971–72 | Clarkson University | ECAC | 30 | 19 | 23 | 42 | 8 | — | — | — | — | — |
| 1972–73 | Clarkson University | ECAC | 32 | 18 | 19 | 37 | 76 | — | — | — | — | — |
| 1972–73 | Omaha Knights | CHL | 5 | 1 | 0 | 1 | 0 | — | — | — | — | — |
| 1973–74 | Omaha Knights | CHL | 67 | 11 | 19 | 30 | 21 | 5 | 0 | 0 | 0 | 2 |
| 1974–75 | Omaha Knights | CHL | 74 | 11 | 19 | 30 | 34 | 6 | 1 | 1 | 2 | 24 |
| 1975–76 | Syracuse Blazers | NAHL | 71 | 15 | 37 | 52 | 16 | 8 | 1 | 8 | 9 | 0 |
| 1975–76 | Cleveland Crusaders | WHA | 4 | 0 | 1 | 1 | 0 | — | — | — | — | — |
| 1976–77 | Greensboro Generals | SHL | 22 | 2 | 8 | 10 | 14 | — | — | — | — | — |
| WHA totals | | | 4 | 0 | 1 | 1 | 0 | — | — | — | — | — |
