= Michel Rouleau =

Canadian ice hockey player

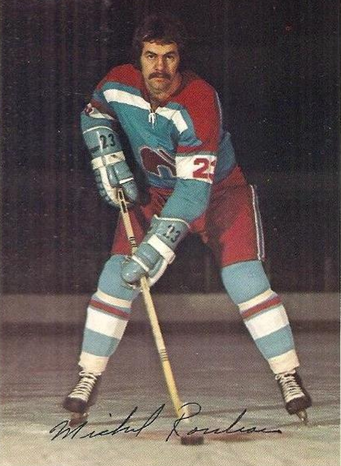
- Rouleau in 1972 photo
- Born: September 28, 1944 (age 81) Hull, Quebec, Canada
- Height: 5 ft 10 in (178 cm)
- Weight: 170 lb (77 kg; 12 st 2 lb)
- Position: Left wing
- Shot: Left
- Played for: Quebec Nordiques; Philadelphia Blazers; San Diego Mariners; Michigan Stags; Baltimore Blades
- Playing career: 1965–1976

Michel Rouleau (born September 28, 1944) is a Canadian former professional ice hockey forward. He played 115 games in the World Hockey Association with the Quebec Nordiques, Philadelphia Blazers, San Diego Mariners, Michigan Stags and Baltimore Blades.

== Career statistics ==
=== Regular season and playoffs ===
			Regular season					Playoffs
Season	Team	League	GP	G	A	Pts	PIM	GP	G	A	Pts	PIM
1964–65	Rosemont Bombers	MMJHL	11	5	15	20	14	—	—	—	—	—
1965–66	Dayton Gems	IHL	58	22	31	53	87	11	2	4	6	16
1966–67	Columbus Checkers	IHL	33	14	17	31	78	—	—	—	—	—
1966–67	Fort Wayne Komets	IHL	30	9	15	24	2	13	4	7	11	12
1967–68	Fort Wayne Komets	IHL	10	1	1	2	26	—	—	—	—	—
1967–68	New Haven Blades	EHL	51	28	67	95	67	10	3	6	9	17
1968–69	New Haven Blades	EHL	72	25	42	67	167	10	7	3	10	12
1969–70	New Haven Blades	EHL	50	26	47	73	222	11	6	3	9	7
1970–71	Charlotte Checkers	EHL	67	47	61	108	197	13	12	14	26	5
1971–72	Charlotte Checkers	EHL	70	35	70	105	224	15	5	12	17	84
1972–73	Philadelphia Blazers	WHA	6	0	1	1	15	—	—	—	—	—
1972–73	Quebec Nordiques	WHA	52	7	14	21	142	—	—	—	—	—
1973–74	Quebec Nordiques	WHA	4	0	4	4	2	—	—	—	—	—
1973–74	Maine Nordiques	NAHL	67	44	65	109	173	8	7	2	9	6
1974–75	Quebec Nordiques	WHA	19	1	7	8	63	—	—	—	—	—
1974–75	San Diego Mariners	WHA	27	5	6	11	42	3	0	0	0	4
1974–75	Michigan Stags/Baltimore Blades	WHA	7	0	3	3	25	—	—	—	—	—
1975–76	Roanoke Valley Rebels	SHL	22	6	11	17	64	—	—	—	—	—
1975–76	Charlotte Checkers	SHL	11	2	6	8	6	11	2	5	7	53
1975–76	Tucson Mavericks	CHL	18	2	6	8	55	—	—	—	—	—
WHA totals			115	13	35	48	289	3	0	0	0	4
