= Alain Caron (ice hockey) =

Canadian ice hockey player

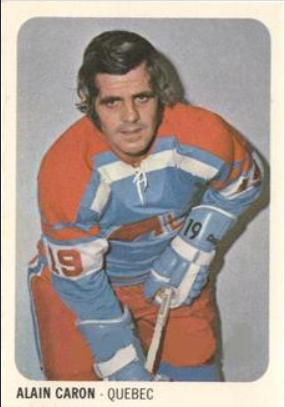
- Caron in 1973 card
- Born: April 27, 1938 Dolbeau-Mistassini, Quebec, Canada
- Died: December 18, 1986 (aged 48) Chicoutimi, Quebec, Canada
- Height: 5 ft 9 in (175 cm)
- Weight: 175 lb (79 kg; 12 st 7 lb)
- Position: C/RW
- Shot: Right
- Played for: Oakland Seals; Montreal Canadiens; Quebec Nordiques; Michigan Stags; Baltimore Blades
- Playing career: 1959–1976

Joseph Paul Luc Alain Caron (April 27, 1938 – December 18, 1986) was a Canadian professional ice hockey player who played in various leagues from 1956 to 1976.

== Career ==
Caron played 60 games in the National Hockey League for the Oakland Seals and Montreal Canadiens, followed by three seasons in the World Hockey Association (WHA) for the Quebec Nordiques and the Michigan Stags/Baltimore Blades.

Caron finished his career in the North American Hockey League, playing for the Beauce Jaros. Jaros finished the 1975-76 season with a career high 78 goals in only 73 games. Additionally, he scored a league-leading 21 goals and 36 points in the playoffs. Caron suffered a heart attack during the summer at age 38 and was forced to retire from professional hockey.

== Personal life ==
After Caron retired from hockey, he took a position working for a brewery in Quebec. Caron died after he suffered a second heart attack on December 18, 1986. He was 48 years old.

== Career statistics ==
=== Regular season and playoffs ===
			Regular season					Playoffs
Season	Team	League	GP	G	A	Pts	PIM	GP	G	A	Pts	PIM
1956–57	Dolbeau Dragons	QJHL	45	69	48	117	118	—	—	—	—	—
1957–58	Chicoutimi Sagueneens	QHL	61	8	9	17	26	6	0	0	0	0
1958–59	Chicoutimi Sagueneens	QHL	56	15	18	33	67	—	—	—	—	—
1959–60	Sault Thunderbirds	EPHL	25	10	4	14	4	—	—	—	—	—
1959–60	Quebec Aces	AHL	38	9	4	13	16	—	—	—	—	—
1960–61	Quebec Aces	AHL	9	5	1	6	2	—	—	—	—	—
1960–61	Sault Ste. Marie Thunderbirds	EPHL	35	11	6	17	16	—	—	—	—	—
1961–62	Amherst Ramblers	NSSHL	45	76	46	122	29	4	7	7	14	4
1961–62	Quebec Aces	AHL	1	0	0	0	0	—	—	—	—	—
1962–63	Charlotte Checkers	EHL	13	10	5	15	7	—	—	—	—	—
1962–63	St. Louis Braves	EPHL	54	61	36	97	22	—	—	—	—	—
1963–64	St. Louis Braves	CHL	71	77	48	125	22	6	6	2	8	6
1964–65	St. Louis Braves	CHL	60	46	19	65	31	—	—	—	—	—
1964–65	Buffalo Bisons	AHL	—	—	—	—	—	5	0	0	0	2
1965–66	Buffalo Bisons	AHL	72	47	29	76	28	—	—	—	—	—
1966–67	Portland Buckaroos	WHL	71	35	25	60	24	4	0	0	0	2
1967–68	Buffalo Bisons	AHL	6	8	2	10	2	—	—	—	—	—
1967–68	California/Oakland Seals	NHL	58	9	13	22	18	—	—	—	—	—
1968–69	Montreal Canadiens	NHL	2	0	0	0	0	—	—	—	—	—
1968–69	Houston Apollos	CHL	68	38	27	65	37	3	0	0	0	0
1969–70	Montreal Voyageurs	AHL	71	35	30	65	32	8	2	0	2	6
1970–71	San Diego Gulls	WHL	70	33	15	48	12	6	1	1	2	4
1971–72	Oklahoma City Blazers	CHL	67	22	20	42	28	6	1	0	1	0
1972–73	Quebec Nordiques	WHA	68	36	27	63	14	—	—	—	—	—
1973–74	Quebec Nordiques	WHA	59	31	15	46	10	—	—	—	—	—
1974–75	Quebec Nordiques	WHA	21	7	3	10	2	—	—	—	—	—
1974–75	Michigan Stags/Baltimore Blades	WHA	47	8	5	13	4	—	—	—	—	—
1974–75	Syracuse Blazers	NAHL	1	1	0	1	0	—	—	—	—	—
1975–76	Beauce Jaros	NAHL	73	78	59	137	26	14	21	13	34	12
WHA totals			195	82	50	132	30	—	—	—	—	—
NHL totals			60	9	13	22	18	—	—	—	—	—

Preceded by None	CPHL Leading Scorer; 1963–64	Succeeded by Tom McCarthy
