= Michigan Stags =

Sports team

- City: Detroit, Michigan
- League: World Hockey Association
- Operated: 1974–75
- Home arena: Cobo Arena
- Colors: Red, black, gold
- Media: WXON-TV; WWJ

Franchise history
- 1972–1974: Los Angeles Sharks
- 1974–1975 (to 18 January): Michigan Stags
- 1975 (remainder of season): Baltimore Blades

The Michigan Stags were a professional ice hockey team based in Detroit that played a portion of the 1974–75 season in the World Hockey Association. On January 18, 1975, the team folded, but the league immediately took over operation and moved the franchise to Baltimore where it was known as the Baltimore Blades. The Stags originated as the Los Angeles Aces, but were renamed the Los Angeles Sharks before their first game, one of the WHA's original twelve teams. The Stags played at Cobo Arena, and the Blades at the Baltimore Civic Center.

== Michigan Stags ==
Having made their fortunes in industrial chemicals, Detroiters Charles Nolton and Peter Shagena bought the Los Angeles Sharks from Dennis Murphy and relocated the club to Detroit as the Michigan Stags. Coached by former Red Wings player and coach Johnny Wilson, the Stags began play in the 1974–75 season. The owners believed the Stags could be an alternative to the NHL's Detroit Red Wings, who had missed the Stanley Cup playoffs in seven of the previous eight seasons.

However, the Stags were even less successful than the Red Wings. The team was composed of journeymen, with the exceptions of star left winger Marc Tardif, veteran Western Hockey League star Gary Veneruzzo and beleaguered ex-NHL goaltender Gerry Desjardins (who found his way back to the NHL in mid-season and helped lead the Buffalo Sabres to the Stanley Cup finals).

Notable draft picks to sign with Michigan included Ed Johnstone, a future 30-goal scorer with the New York Rangers (he scored four times in 23 games for the Stags, including the first regular-season goal in club history), Bill Evo, Bill Reed and Barry Legge. The club also had problems drawing crowds; despite playing over .500 (12-8-2) at Cobo Arena, attendance was not nearly enough to break even. Only 2,522 were at their first home game (it did not help that the team had to play their first five games on the road, as the circus was in town), and subsequent gates were not much better; the club averaged 2,959 fans for its 22 home games.

Additionally, the Stags were unable to secure a television deal (except for a one-off local broadcast), rendering them practically invisible. Losing money, the team was eventually forced to trade Tardif to Quebec for Pierre Guite, Michel Rouleau and famed minor league sniper Alain Caron.

The Stags hoped they could at least draw fans for the highly anticipated return of Gordie Howe to Detroit, but Howe's Houston Aeros were not scheduled to play at Cobo until February 2.

The Aeros did play two exhibition games: the first, across the river in Windsor on October 8; the other, two days later at Cobo Arena. Howe and his sons missed the first game, as they were in Czechoslovakia with Team Canada; Gordie scored twice in the second contest, before a crowd of 5,536. As it turned out, Howe and company would never meet the Stags in regular-season game in Detroit, as the team had moved before then.

The WHA club were one of three new pro franchises that burst upon the Detroit sports scene in 1974, along with the Detroit Loves of World Team Tennis (who also played at Cobo) and the Detroit Wheels of the newly minted World Football League (who played in distant Ypsilanti, Michigan). Within a three-month span, though, they were all gone: the hapless 1-13 Wheels folded October 10; the Loves (after drawing just 2,213 fans per match and losing $300,000) moved to Indianapolis on November 18; and, in January 1975, the Stags disappeared as well.

Their 5–4, overtime win over Winnipeg on January 9 in front of 3,125 fans at Cobo would turn out to be their final game in Detroit. Two weeks later, on January 23, the WHA finally announced that the club was relocating to Baltimore. The league later sued the two owners for fraud.

== Baltimore Blades ==
Baltimore Blades
- City: Baltimore, Maryland
- League: World Hockey Association
- Operated: 1975
- Home arena: Baltimore Civic Center
- Colors: Black, orange
- Media: WBAL-FM; WBAL (AM)
- Affiliates: Winston-Salem Polar Twins

Franchise history
- 1972: Los Angeles Aces (changed name before first game)
- 1972–1974: Los Angeles Sharks
- 1974–1975 (to 18 January): Michigan Stags
- 1975 (remainder of season): Baltimore Blades

The Baltimore Blades were created out of the remains of the Stags (retaining coach Johnny Wilson, although he was unenthusiastic about the shift) and were operated by the league; the move caused the American Hockey League's Baltimore Clippers, already in financial trouble, to promptly fold. After playing seven straight road games (all losses), the Blades debuted at the Baltimore Civic Center on February 2 (coincidentally against the Howe-led club from Houston) in front of 9,023 fans. Attendance went flat soon thereafter, however, as the Blades averaged only 3,568 for 17 home dates (which was actually an improvement over Detroit, even though the Blades were an awful 3-13-1 in Baltimore.) At season's end, the league contemplated moving the franchise to Seattle (which would have marked the franchise's fourth home in less than a year), but instead the club was terminated. Players from the Michigan/Baltimore team, along with those of the defunct Chicago Cougars, were put into a dispersal draft to be claimed by other WHA teams.

The team's final record was 21-53-4, the second-worst in the WHA and far out of a playoff spot. Veneruzzo was the leading scorer for the team with a 33-27-60 mark, nearly twice as much as anyone else save for Jean-Paul LeBlanc. (The infamous enforcer Bill Goldthorpe also signed on for seven games, piling up 26 penalty minutes.) The last active Stags/Blades player in major professional hockey was Ed Johnstone, who last played in the 1986-87 NHL season.

== Media coverage ==
The Stags' radio station was WWJ 950. Gary Morrel was play-by-play announcer while Norm Plummer handled color commentary. At least one broadcast had only two sponsors mentioned: Nolwood Chemical, a company owned by the Stags' owners, and the Stags themselves (with the unexciting slogan, "Watch the new hockey action!").

Michigan played just one game on local television: the season opener against the Indianapolis Racers, broadcast live from Indianapolis on WXON Channel 20. Detroit radio icon Vince Doyle called play-by-play and former Red Wing Marty Pavelich was the color commentator. The Stags won the game, 4–2, but few saw it as they were up against game five of the 1974 World Series, which was airing locally on WDIV. Eight other games were scheduled to be televised but money became a problem by mid-November, especially after the Stags lost 11 of their next 12 games following the season-opening win.

After the relocation, a radio deal was made with most Blades games being on WBAL-FM (now WIYY-FM) and about eight on WBAL (AM). No Blades games are known to have been played on local television.

== Season-by-season record ==
Note: GP = Games played, W = Wins, L = Losses, T = Ties, Pts = Points, GF = Goals for, GA = Goals against, PIM = Penalties in minutes

Season	GP	W	L	T	Pts	GF	GA	PIM	Finish	Playoffs
1974–75	78	21	53	4	46	205	341	1104	5th, Western	Did not qualify
