= List of ice hockey teams in Michigan =

The following is a list of ice hockey teams in Michigan, past and present. It includes the league(s) they play for, and championships won.

== Major professional ==
=== National Hockey League 1917– ===
Team	City	Established	Stanley Cups	Notes
Detroit Red Wings	Detroit	1926	11	Also known as the Cougars (1926–30) and the Falcons (1930–32)

=== World Hockey Association 1972–79 ===
Team	City	Existed	Avco Cups	Notes
Michigan Stags	Detroit	1974–75	0	Moved to Baltimore on January 18, 1975, and became the Baltimore Blades

== Minor professional ==
=== All American Hockey League 2008–2011 ===
Current teams

Team	City	Existed	League Titles	Notes
Battle Creek Revolution	Battle Creek	2008–2011	1	

=== American Hockey League 1936– ===
Team	City	Established	Calder Cups	Notes
Grand Rapids Griffins	Grand Rapids	2001	2	Founded in 1996 in the IHL

=== ECHL 1988-present ===
Also called East Coast Hockey League from 1988 to 2003

Team	City	Established	Kelly Cups	Notes
Kalamazoo Wings	Kalamazoo	1999	0	Established as the Madison Kodiaks

=== Federal Prospects Hockey League 2010–present ===
Also called Federal Hockey League from 2010 to 2019.

Team	City	Established	Commissioner's Cups	Notes
Battle Creek Rumble Bees	Battle Creek	2019		Joined the Federal Hockey League in 2019
Motor City Rockers	Fraser	2022	0	Joined the Federal Hockey League in 2022
Port Huron Prowlers	Port Huron	2015	1	Joined the Federal Hockey League in 2015
St. Clair Shores Fighting Saints	Saint Clair Shores	2016–17	0	Joined the Federal Hockey League in 2016, relocated to Kingsville, Ontario, in 2017

=== International Hockey League 2007–2010 ===
Former teams

Team	City	Established	Turner Cups	Notes
Flint Generals	Flint	2007–2010	0	
Kalamazoo Wings	Kalamazoo	2007–2010	0	
Port Huron IceHawks	Port Huron	2007–2010	0	

=== Mid-Atlantic Hockey League 2007–08 ===
Current teams

Team	City	Established	League Titles	Notes
Battle Creek Revolution	Battle Creek	2008	0	
Chelsea Tornadoes	Chelsea	2008	0	
Detroit Dragons	Fraser	2008	0	
Trenton Warriors	Trenton	2008	0	

=== United Hockey League 1997–2007 ===
Team	City	Existed	Colonial Cups	Notes
Flint Generals	Flint	1997–2007	1	
Kalamazoo Wings	Kalamazoo	2000–2007	1	Played as the Madison Kodiaks in 1999–2000
Motor City Mechanics	Fraser	2004–2006	0	Franchise suspended for 2006–2007 season
Muskegon Fury	Muskegon	1997–2007	4	
Port Huron Beacons	Port Huron	2002–2005	0	Became the Roanoke Valley Vipers in 2005
Port Huron Border Cats	Port Huron	1997–2002	0	
Port Huron Flags	Port Huron	2005–2007	0	
Saginaw Gears	Saginaw	1998–1999	0	Became the Ohio Gears on December 20, 1999
Saginaw LumberKings	Saginaw	1997–1998	0	Became the Saginaw Gears in 1998

=== Colonial Hockey League 1991–97 ===
Team	City	Existed	Colonial Cups	Notes
Detroit Falcons	Fraser	1992–1996	0	
Flint Bulldogs	Flint	1991–1993	0	Became the Utica Bulldogs in 1993
Flint Generals	Flint	1993–1997	1	
Muskegon Fury	Muskegon	1992–1997	0	
Michigan Falcons	Fraser	1991–1992	0	Became the Detroit Falcons in 1992
Port Huron Border Cats	Port Huron	1996–1997	0	
Saginaw LumberKings	Saginaw	1996–1997	0	
Saginaw Wheels	Saginaw	1994–1996	0	Became the Saginaw LumberKings in 1996

=== International Hockey League 1945–2001 ===
Team	City	Existed	Turner Cups	Notes
Detroit Auto Club	Detroit	1945–1951	1	
Detroit Bright's Goodyears	Detroit	1945–1949	0	
Detroit Hettche	Detroit	1949–1952	0	
Detroit Jerry Lynch	Detroit	1948–1949	0	
Detroit Metal Mouldings	Detroit	1946–1948	0	
Detroit Vipers	Auburn Hills	1994–2001	1	
Flint Generals	Flint	1969–1985	1	Became the Flint Spirits in 1985
Flint Spirits	Flint	1985–1990	0	
Grand Rapids Griffins	Grand Rapids	1996–2001	0	Joined the American Hockey League in 2001
Grand Rapids Owls	Grand Rapids	1977–1980	0	
Grand Rapids Rockets	Grand Rapids	1950–1956	0	
Kalamazoo Wings	Kalamazoo	1974–1995	2	Became the Michigan K-Wings in 1995
Lansing Lancers	Lansing	1974–1975	0	Suspended operations January 16, 1975 after 41 games
Michigan K-Wings	Kalamazoo	1995–2000	0	
Muskegon Lumberjacks	Muskegon	1984–1992	2	Became the Cleveland Lumberjacks in 1992
Muskegon Mohawks	Muskegon	1965–1984	1	Became the Muskegon Lumberjacks in 1984
Muskegon Zephyrs	Muskegon	1960–1965	1	Became the Muskegon Mohawks in 1965
Port Huron Flags	Port Huron	1962–1971	2	Became the Port Huron Wings in 1974
Port Huron Flags	Port Huron	1974–1981	0	
Port Huron Wings	Port Huron	1971–1974	1	Became the Port Huron Flags in 1974
Saginaw Gears	Saginaw	1972–1983	2	
Saginaw Generals	Saginaw	1985–1987	0	
Saginaw Hawks	Saginaw	1987–1989	0	

=== International Independent Hockey League 2003–04 ===
Team	City	Existed	League Titles	Notes
Lansing Ice Nuts	Lansing	2003–2004	0	
Motor City Snipers	Detroit	2003–2004	0	
Northern Michigan Predators	Harbor Springs	2003–2004	1	
Soo City Mavericks	Sault Ste. Marie	2003–2004	0	

=== All-American Hockey League 1986–89 ===
Team	City	Existed	League Titles	Notes
Downriver Stars	Trenton	1986–1987	0	
Jackson All-Americans	Jackson	1986–1989	0	
Lincoln Park Patriots	Lincoln Park	1988–1989	0	
Michigan Stars	Trenton	1987–1988	0	Suspended operations during the season
Port Huron Clippers	Port Huron	1987–1988	0	

=== Continental Hockey League 1972–86 ===
Team	City	Existed	League Titles	Notes
Grand Rapids Grizzlies	Grand Rapids	1980–1982	0	

=== United States Hockey League 1961–79 ===
Team	City	Existed	League Titles	Notes
Calumet-Houghton Chiefs	Calumet	1972–1973	0	
Copper Country Chiefs	Calumet	1974–1976	?	
Copper Country Islanders	Calumet	1973–1974	?	
Grand Rapids Blades	Grand Rapids	1976–1977	?	
Grand Rapids Bruins	Grand Rapids	1968–1969	?	
Marquette Iron Rangers	Marquette	1964–1976	?	
Traverse City Bays	Traverse City	1975–1977	?	

=== Ohio State Hockey League 1946–48 ===
Team	City	Existed	League Titles	Notes
Dearborn Monarchs	Dearborn	1947–1948	0	
Detroit Teamsters	Detroit	1947–1948	0	

=== Eastern Amateur Hockey League 1933–53 ===
Team	City	Existed	League Titles	Notes
Grand Rapids Rockets	Grand Rapids	1949–1950	0	Joined the International Hockey League in 1950

== Early Leagues ==
=== International Hockey League 1929–36 ===
Team	City	Existed	F.G. "Teddy" Oke Trophies	Notes
Detroit Olympics	Detroit	1929–1936	2	

=== Canadian Professional Hockey League 1926–30 ===
Team	City	Existed	F.G. "Teddy" Oke Trophies	Notes
Detroit Olympics	Detroit	1927–1929	0	Joined the International Hockey League in 1929

=== American Hockey Association 1926–1942 ===
Team	City	Existed	Harry F. Sinclair Trophies	Notes
Detroit Greyhounds	Detroit	1926–1927	0	Withdrew after 10 games

=== International Professional Hockey League 1904–07 ===
Team	City	Existed	League Titles	Notes
American Soo Indians	Sault Ste. Marie	1904–1907	0	
Calumet Miners	Calumet	1904–1907	1	
Portage Lakes Lakers	Houghton	1904–1907	2	

== College ==
=== NCAA Division I ===
==== Big Ten Conference 2013–present ====
The Big Ten started its men's hockey league in 2013.

Team	City	Big Ten tenure (Note: Refers to tenure in Big Ten hockey.)	Regular-season titles	Tournament titles	NCAA Titles (in Big Ten)	Notes
Michigan Wolverines	Ann Arbor	2013–present	1	0	9 (0)	
Michigan State Spartans	East Lansing	2013–present	0	0	3 (0)	

==== Central Collegiate Hockey Association 1971–2013, 2021–present ====
The original CCHA, a casualty of the conference realignment brought on by the formation of the Big Ten hockey league, disbanded in 2013. The league was revived in 2020, with play starting in 2021–22, by seven members of the men's Western Collegiate Hockey Association, four of which had played in the final season of the original CCHA.

Current teams

Team	City	CCHA tenure	Regular season titles	Mason Cups	NCAA Titles (in CCHA)	Notes
Ferris State Bulldogs	Big Rapids	1976–2013, 2021–present	1	0	0 (0)	Played in the WCHA during the CCHA's hiatus.
Lake Superior State Lakers	Sault Ste. Marie	1972–2013, 2021–present	4	4	3 (3)	Played in the WCHA during the CCHA's hiatus.
Michigan Tech Huskies	Houghton	1981–1984, 2021–present	0	0	3 (0)	Played in the WCHA through 1980–81; returned to the WCHA in 1984–85 and played there until the revival of the CCHA.
Northern Michigan Wildcats	Marquette	1977–1984, 1997–2013, 2021–present	2	2	1 (0)	Played in the WCHA from 1984–1997 and again during the CCHA's hiatus.

Former teams

Team	City	CCHA tenure	Regular season titles	Mason Cups	NCAA Titles (in CCHA)	Notes
Michigan Wolverines	Ann Arbor	1981–2013	8	7	9 (2)	Played in WCHA 1951–81; now plays in its full-time home of the Big Ten.
Michigan State Spartans	East Lansing	1981–2013	7	11	3 (2)	Played in WCHA 1951–81; now plays in its full-time home of the Big Ten.
Western Michigan Broncos	Kalamazoo	1975–2013	0	1	0	Now plays in the NCHC.

==== College Hockey America 1999–2008 (men), 2002–present (women) ====
CHA was founded as a men-only league. It added women's hockey in 2002 and remains in operation today as a women-only league.

Men

Team	City	CHA tenure	Peters Cup	McLeod Trophy	NCAA Titles	Notes
Wayne State Warriors	Detroit	1999–2008	1	3	0	Wayne State dropped men's hockey as a varsity sport after the 2007–08 season.

Women

Team	City	CHA tenure	Regular-season titles	Tournament titles	NCAA titles	Notes
Wayne State Warriors	Detroit	2002–2011	1	0	0	Wayne State dropped women's hockey as a varsity sport after the 2010–11 season.

==== National Collegiate Hockey Conference 2013–present ====
The NCHC, formed during the early-2010s Division I hockey conference realignment brought on by the formation of the Big Ten hockey league, began play in 2013. It has been a men-only league throughout its history.

Team	City	NCHC tenure	Regular-season titles	Tournament titles	NCAA Titles (in NCHC)	Notes
Western Michigan Broncos	Kalamazoo	2013–present	1	1	1 (1)	

==== Western Collegiate Hockey Association 1951–2021 ====
The WCHA was formed 30 years before the NCAA began sponsoring women's sports, and did not establish a women's league until 1999. No Michigan school has ever been a member of the women's WCHA. In late 2019, seven of the 10 then-current men's members announced they would leave the WCHA after the 2020–21 season; shortly thereafter, they announced that they would form a revived CCHA. With the departure of these seven schools, plus an eighth WCHA men's member announcing that it would drop men's hockey after 2020–21, the men's WCHA is all but certain to fold. It will remain in operation as a women-only league.

Former teams

Team	City	WCHA tenure	MacNaughton Cups	Broadmoor Trophies	NCAA Titles (in WCHA)	Notes
Michigan Wolverines	Ann Arbor	1951–1981	?	?	9 (7)	
Michigan State Spartans	East Lansing	1951–1981	?	?	2	
Michigan Tech Huskies	Houghton	1951–1981, 1984–2021	6	9	3 (3)	Played in CCHA from 1981–1984; returned to the revived CCHA in 2021.
Northern Michigan Wildcats	Marquette	1984–1997	??	?	1 (1)	

=== NCAA Division III ===
==== Midwest Collegiate Hockey Association 1998– ====
Team	City	Established	Conference titles	NCAA Titles	Notes
Adrian Bulldogs	Adrian	2007	1	1	
Finlandia Lions	Hancock	2004	0	0	

== Junior ==
=== Ontario Hockey League 1980–present ===
Current teams

Team	City	Established	J. Ross Robertson Cups	Memorial Cups	Notes
Flint Firebirds	Flint	2015	2	0	Also known as the Detroit Compuware Ambassadors (1990–92), Detroit Junior Red Wings (1992–95), Detroit Whalers (1995–97), and Plymouth Whalers
Saginaw Spirit	Saginaw	2002	0	1	Was previously the North Bay Centennials

Muskegon lumberjacks

=== Junior A Tier II Hockey Leagues ===
==== North American Hockey League 1975– ====
The NAHL was known as the Great Lakes Junior Hockey League from 1975–1984.

Former teams

Team	City	Existed	Season titles	Playoff/League titles	Notes
Alpena IceDiggers	Alpena	2005–2010	0	0	Previously the Toledo IceDiggers, became the Corpus Christi IceRays
Bloomfield Jets	Bloomfield	1987–1990	0	0	Became Lakeland Jets
Capital Centre Pride	Dimondale	2000–2003	0	0	Previously Grand Rapids Rockets
Dearborn Magic	Dearborn	1990–1991	0	0	Became Michigan Nationals
Dearborn Heights Nationals	Dearborn Heights	1994–1996	0	0	Previously Michigan Nationals, became St. Louis Sting
Detroit Compuware/Compuware Ambassadors	Detroit; Plymouth; Oak Park	1984–1992; 1992–2000; 2000–2003	8	11	
Detroit Falcons	Fraser	1986–1987	0	0	Formerly the St. Clair Shores Falcons
Detroit Freeze	Fraser	1992–1997	1	0	Became Chicago Freeze
Detroit Junior Wings	Detroit	1975–1983; 1987–1992	0	0	
Detroit Little Caesars	Detroit	1975–1976	1	1	
Fraser Flags	Fraser	1981–1984	0	0	
Fraser Highlanders	Fraser	1976–1980	0	0	
Gaylord Grizzlies	Gaylord	1995–1998	0	0	Became Grand Rapids Bearcats
Grand Rapids Bearcats	Wyoming	1998–1999	0	0	Ceased operations December 31, 1999. Team became Grand Rapids Rockets
Grand Rapids Rockets	Wyoming	1999–2000	0	0	Previously the Grand Rapids Bearcats. Became the Capital Centre Pride
Hennessy Engineers	Plymouth	1985–1987	0	0	
Kalamazoo Jr. K-Wings	Kalamazoo	2011–2013	0	0	
Kalamazoo Jr. Wings	Kalamazoo	1989–1994	1	2	Became the Danville Wings
Lakeland Jets	Waterford	1990–1995	0	0	Previously Bloomfield Jets, became Soo Indians
Marquette Rangers	Marquette	2006–2010	0	0	Became the Michigan Warriors
Melvindale Blades	Melvindale	1989–1990	0	0	
Melvindale Lakers	Melvindale	1982–1983	0	0	
Michigan Nationals	Dearborn	1991–1994	0	0	Previously Dearborn Magic, became Dearborn Heights Nationals
Michigan Warriors	Flint	2010–2015	0	0	formerly the Marquette Rangers, folded after being displaced by the OHL Flint Firebirds
Motor City Machine/Metal Jackets	Detroit	2008–2011	0	0	Became the Jamestown Ironmen
NACE	Redford, Michigan	1989–1990	0	0	
Oakland Chiefs	Southfield	1975–1976	0	0	
Paddock Pool Saints	Escorse	1975–1984	7	7	
Port Huron Fighting Falcons	Port Huron	2010–2014	0	0	Became the Keystone Ice Miners
Port Huron Fogcutters	Port Huron	1975	0	0	Withdrew November 21, 1975
Redford Royals	Redford	1978–1984; 1987–1989	0	0	
Saginaw Gears	Saginaw	1991–1995	0	0	Became the Gaylord Grizzlies in December 1995
St. Clair Shores Falcons	St. Clair Shores	1983–1986	2	2	Became the Detroit Falcons
Soo Eagles	Sault Ste. Marie	2012–2015	0	0	purchased Traverse City North Stars franchise; joined from NOJHL; NAHL franchise relocated to become the New Jersey Junior Titans; Soo Eagles rejoined the NOJHL
Soo Indians	Sault Ste. Marie	1995–2005	1	0	Previously Lakeland Jets
Traverse City North Stars	Traverse City	2005–2012	0	0	Franchise became the Soo Eagles
U.S. National Team Development Program	Ann Arbor	1997–2010	0	0	
Waterford Lakers	Waterford	1981–1982	0	0	
Wayne Chiefs	Wayne	1976–1980	1	0	National Champs 1980
Western Michigan Wolves	Kalamazoo, Michigan	1988–1989	0	0	Became Kalamazoo Jr. Wings

==== Northern Ontario Junior Hockey League 1978– ====
Current teams

Team	City	Established	Season titles	Playoff titles	Notes	
Soo Eagles	Sault Ste. Marie	2008–2012, 2015–present	1	0	0	joined NAHL from 2012–15, rejoined NOJHL

Former teams

Team	City	Established	League titles	Dudley Hewitt Cups	Royal Bank Cups	Notes
Soo Indians	Sault Ste. Marie	2006–2008	1	0	0	Became Soo Eagles in 2008
Northern Michigan Black Bears	Sault Ste. Marie	2003–2006	0	0	0	Became Soo Indians in 2006
Soo Michigan Realtors	Sault Ste. Marie	1962–1964	0	0	0	

==== Continental Elite Hockey League 2001–2004 ====
Team	City	Established	League titles	Notes
Brownstown Bombers	Brownstown	?	0	
Detroit Belle Tire Lightning	Fraser	?	1	
Michigan Stars	Trenton	?	0	
Traverse City Enforcers	Traverse City	2001–2004	0	

==== Southern Ontario Junior A Hockey League 1970–1976 ====
Team	City	Established	League titles	Notes
Detroit Jr. Red Wings	Detroit	1970–75	1	
Michigan Americans	Utica	1973–74	0	

==== Wolverine Junior Hockey League 1972–1975 ====
The Wolverine Junior Hockey League and the Michigan Junior Hockey League combined in 1975 to form the Great Lakes Junior Hockey League which later became the North American Hockey League.

Team	City	Existed	Season titles	Playoff titles	Notes
Flint	Flint	1973-197?	?	?	
Kalamazoo	Kalamazoo	1973-197?	0	0	
Livonia	Livonia	1973-197?	0	0	
Oak Park	Oak Park	1972-197?	?	?	
Southfield Chiefs	Southfield	1972–1975	0	0	Oak Park and Southfield started the annual contest for the Purple Paddle (a goalie stick painted purple) in 1972–73. It was awarded to the winner of the season series by the mayors of each city. The same purple paddle was continued into the 1990s by the successors of these two teams who were eventually in the North American Hockey League.
Trenton	Trenton	1972–1973	0	0	

==== Michigan Junior Hockey League 197?–1975 ====
Team	City	Existed	Season titles	Playoff titles	Notes
Waterford Lakers	Waterford	1972–1975	?	?	
Plymouth Pilgrims	Plymouth, Michigan	1972–1974	?	?	
Dearborn Fabricating	Dearborn	?	?	?	
St. Clair Shores Saints	St. Clair Shores, MI	1970-?	?	?	
Westland Jays	Westland, MI	1972–1975	?	?	

=== Junior A Tier III Hockey Leagues ===
==== Central States Hockey League ====
Current Teams

Team	City	Established	Regular season titles	Hurster Cups	USA Hockey Silver Cups	Notes
Flint Junior Generals	Flint	1999	?	?	?	
Grand Rapids Junior Owls	Byron Center	1999	?	?	?	
Metro Jets	Waterford	1989	1	2	1	
Motor City Chiefs	Dearborn Heights	1997?	?	?	?	

Former Teams

Team	City	Existed	Regular season titles	Hurster Cups	USA Hockey Silver Cups	Notes
Compuware	?	1997?–1998	?	?	?	
Grand Rapids Junior Grizzlies	Byron Center	1998–1999	0	0	0	
Wayne Wheelers	Wayne	1998–1999	0	0	0	
Wayne Wheels	Wayne	1999–2001?	?	?	?	

==== Western Junior B Hockey League ====
Team	City	Established	League titles	Notes
Port Huron Flags	Port Huron	?	0	

== League, regional and national championships ==
Championship	Times won	Description
Stanley Cup	11	National Hockey League champion
Turner Cup	14	International Hockey League champion
Calder Cup	2	American Hockey League championship
Commissioner's Cup	1	Federal Prospects Hockey League championship
Colonial Cup	7	United Hockey League champion
Memorial Cup	1	Canadian Major-Junior national champion
J. Ross Robertson Cup	1	Ontario Hockey League champion
NCAA title	20	NCAA Men's Ice Hockey champion
CCHA regular season champion	22	CCHA regular season champion
Mason Cup	25	CCHA playoff champion
MacNaughton Cup	6?	WCHA regular season champion
Broadmoor Trophy	9?	WCHA playoff championship
R.H. "Bob" Peters Cup	1	CHA regular season champion
Bruce M. McLeod Trophy	3	CHA playoff champion
Gibson Cup	?	(1938–1958) Michigan Ontario Hockey League and (1968–current) played for in the Great Lakes Hockey League between the Portage Lake Pioneers and Calumet Wolves

== See also ==
- List of ice hockey teams in Ontario
- USA Hockey
