= Keith Kokkola =

Canadian ice hockey player

- Born: May 4, 1949; Windsor, Ontario, Canada
- Died: September 24, 2004 (aged 55); Windsor, Ontario, Canada
- Height: 6 ft 3 in (191 cm)
- Weight: 210 lb (95 kg; 15 st 0 lb)
- Position: Defense
- Shot: Left
- Played for: WHA; Chicago Cougars; Denver Spurs/Ottawa Civics; Birmingham Bulls; IHL; Des Moines Capitols; CHL; Fort Worth Texans; NAHL; Erie Blades; AHL; New Haven Nighthawks; SHL; Richmond Wildcats; PHL; San Francisco Shamrocks; Tucson Rustlers; ACHL; Nashville South Stars
- NHL draft: Undrafted
- Playing career: 1973–1983

Keith Victor Kokkola (May 4, 1949 - September 24, 2004) was a Canadian professional ice hockey player.

Between 1974 and 1977, Kokkola played 54 games in the World Hockey Association with the Chicago Cougars, Denver Spurs/Ottawa Civics, and Birmingham Bulls. Before his professional hockey career, Kokkola played college football as a defensive tackle at the University of North Carolina.

== Career statistics ==
			Regular season					Playoffs
Season	Team	League	GP	G	A	Pts	PIM	GP	G	A	Pts	PIM
1967–68	Leamington Flyers	WOJBHL	—	—	—	—	—	—	—	—	—	—
1973–74	Des Moines Capitols	IHL	75	1	21	22	208	10	0	3	3	30
1974–75	Long Island Cougars	NAHL-Sr.	44	5	11	16	135	9	0	0	0	37
1974–75	Chicago Cougars	WHA	33	0	2	2	69	—	—	—	—	—
1975–76	Fort Worth Texans	CHL	26	0	4	4	100	—	—	—	—	—
1975–76	Erie Blades	NAHL-Sr.	27	3	9	12	73	—	—	—	—	—
1975–76	Denver Spurs/Ottawa Civics	WHA	16	0	3	3	40	—	—	—	—	—
1976–77	New Haven Nighthawks	AHL	7	0	2	2	53	6	1	1	2	2
1976–77	Birmingham Bulls	WHA	5	0	0	0	21	—	—	—	—	—
1976–77	Richmond Wildcats	SHL-Sr.	30	6	12	18	66	—	—	—	—	—
1977–78	San Francisco Shamrocks	PHL-Sr.	39	3	16	19	111	—	—	—	—	—
1978–79	San Francisco Shamrocks	PHL-Sr.	23	0	2	2	43	—	—	—	—	—
1978–79	Tucson Rustlers	PHL-Sr.	27	1	11	12	11	—	—	—	—	—
1982–83	Nashville South Stars	ACHL	28	0	6	6	50	—	—	—	—	—
WHA totals			54	0	5	5	130	—	—	—	—	—
AHL totals			7	0	2	2	53	6	1	1	2	2
PHL-Sr. totals			89	4	29	33	165	—	—	—	—	—
