= Ken Wilson (ice hockey) =

Ice hockey manager (1923–2008)

- Born: July 23, 1923 Craik, Saskatchewan, Canada
- Died: April 3, 2008 (aged 84) Chandler, Arizona, U.S.
- Playing career: 1946–1986

Kenneth Athol Wilson (July 23, 1923 – April 3, 2008) was a minor league hockey general manager and owner for forty years. He was born in Craik, Saskatchewan. His career as a manager spanned sixteen years in the International Hockey League, five years in the Continental Hockey League and single seasons each in the National Hockey League, Western Hockey League and Eastern Hockey League. Wilson was known for identifying young talent; his players won league-wide Rookie of the Year awards seven times.

== Early life ==
Wilson played for the Mayfair Public School hockey team in Saskatoon, Saskatchewan. In 1937, Mayfair won the J.D. McDonald Cup for the Saskatoon public schools hockey championship, with Wilson playing from the centre and left-wing positions.

== Career ==
In 1946, Wilson moved from Trail, British Columbia to Fort Worth, Texas to play for the Rangers in the United States Hockey League (1945-51).

In 1950, Wilson became the manager of the new Hobart Arena, in Troy, Ohio. As manager, Wilson booked and promoted many of the leading acts of the 1950s, including the first Ohio venue for Elvis Presley on November 24, 1956, Roy Rogers, Gene Autry, Nat King Cole, Tex Ritter, Sonja Henie, Victor Borge, Liberace, Guy Lombardo, and Patti Page.

Starting in 1951 and for the next eight seasons, he owned and operated the IHL team Troy Bruins.

Wilson spent the 1959-1960 hockey season as EHL Greensboro Generals' general manager.

For three seasons starting in 1960, Wilson was the general manager of the Omaha Knights in the IHL.

In 1963, Wilson moved to Toledo, Ohio, where he owned and started the Toledo Blades in the IHL. Over the next three seasons, he served as general manager and as a mid-season replacement in 1966, as coach. In 1964, the Toledo Blades won the Fred A. Huber Trophy, awarded for "Most Points in the Regular Season' and the Turner Cup awarded to the playoff champions.

In 1966, Wilson managed the Vancouver Canucks in the Western Hockey League. Bert Olmstead was the coach.

In 1967 the National Hockey League expanded and Olmstead was hired as general manager and coach of the Oakland Seals after the June 7, 1967 NHL player draft. Olmstead hired Wilson to run a farm team the following season. The entire hockey staff was fired at the end of the first season.

Wilson was assistant manager of the Muskegon Mohawks in the IHL for two seasons, 1970–1971 and 1971-1972.

In 1972 Wilson was hired as general manager by the Des Moines, Iowa franchise in the IHL. Feeling the franchise needed a new look and image, Wilson changed the name to the Des Moines Capitols. In 1973-1974, the Capitols won the Huber Trophy and the Turner Cup. This was the only season that a Des Moines-based IHL team finished first and won the playoffs. The Capitols disbanded in 1975.

Wilson managed the Flint Generals in 1975-1976 and the Dayton Gems in 1976-1977.

In 1981, Wilson formed a group of investors to establish an IHL team in Peoria, Illinois. The Peoria Prancers began play in the 1982-1983 season. After years of good labor relations, the United Auto Workers went on strike against Caterpillar Inc. on October 1, 1982. At the time 50% of Peorians were employed directly or indirectly by Caterpillar. The strike lasted the entire first hockey season. The Prancers were never able to recover from the effects of the strike and folded after the 1983-1984 season.

Wilson moved to Danville, Illinois and took over full-time duties for the Danville Dashers in the Continental Hockey League for the next two seasons. He retired from hockey following the 1985-1986 season.

Wilson lived in Chandler, Arizona with his wife Betty, until his death in 2008.

== Team Awards ==
- 1963 - 1964 Toledo Blades Fred A. Huber Trophy Most Points in the Regular Season
- 1963 - 1964 Toledo Blades Turner Cup Playoff Champions
- 1970 - 1971 Muskegon Mohawks Fred A. Huber Trophy Most Points in the Regular Season
- 1971 - 1972 Muskegon Mohawks Fred A. Huber Trophy Most Points in the Regular Season
- 1973 - 1974 Des Moines Capitols Fred A. Huber Trophy Most Points in the Regular Season
- 1973 - 1974 Des Moines Capitols Turner Cup Playoff Champions
- 1981 - 1982 Danville Dashers Most Points Regular Season
- 1981 - 1982 Danville Dashers Wal-Mar Cup Playoff Champions
- 1983 - 1984 Danville Dashers Wal-Mar Cup'Playoff Champions

== Rookie of the Year awards ==
- 1962-1963 Omaha Knights, John Gravel, Rookie of the Year Trophy
- 1963-1964 Toledo Blades, Don Westbrook, Rookie of the Year Trophy
- 1964-1965 Toledo Blades, Bob Thomas, Rookie of the Year Trophy
- 1971-1972 Muskegon Mohawks, Glenn "Chico" Resch, Rookie of the Year Trophy
- 1972-1973 Des Moines Capitols, Danny Gloor, Rookie of the Year Trophy
- 1973-1974 Des Moines Capitols, Frank DeMarco, Rookie of the Year Trophy
- 1982-1983 Peoria Prancers, Paul Fenton, Ken McKenzie Trophy IHL Most Outstanding American Born Rookie
