= Randy Wyrozub =

Canadian ice hockey player (born 1950)

- Born: April 8, 1950 (age 75) Lacombe, Alberta, Canada
- Height: 5 ft 11 in (180 cm)
- Weight: 170 lb (77 kg; 12 st 2 lb)
- Position: Centre
- Shot: Left
- Played for: Buffalo Sabres; Indianapolis Racers (WHA)
- NHL draft: 43rd overall, 1970; Buffalo Sabres
- Playing career: 1970–1979

William Randall Wyrozub (/waɪˈroʊzʌb/ wy-ROH-zuhb; born April 8, 1950) is a Canadian former professional ice hockey centre. Wyrozub played in the National Hockey League and World Hockey Association between 1970 and 1976,

Born in Lacombe, Alberta, he was drafted in the fourth round, 43rd overall, by the Buffalo Sabres in the 1970 NHL Amateur Draft. He played 100 games in the National Hockey League with the Sabres, scoring eight goals and adding ten assists. He later played fifty-five games in the World Hockey Association with the Indianapolis Racers, scoring eleven goals and adding fourteen assists.

== Career statistics ==
=== Regular season and playoffs ===
| | | | Regular season | | | | | Playoffs |
| Season | Team | League | GP | G | A | Pts | PIM | GP | G | A | Pts | PIM |
|---|---|---|---|---|---|---|---|---|---|---|---|---|
| 1968–69 | Ponoka Stampeders | AJHL | 42 | 31 | 25 | 56 | 32 | — | — | — | — | — |
| 1969–70 | Edmonton Oil Kings | WCHL | 58 | 24 | 34 | 58 | 23 | 18 | 11 | 7 | 18 | 6 |
| 1970–71 | Buffalo Sabres | NHL | 16 | 2 | 2 | 4 | 6 | — | — | — | — | — |
| 1970–71 | Salt Lake Golden Eagles | WHL | 23 | 7 | 4 | 11 | 2 | — | — | — | — | — |
| 1971–72 | Buffalo Sabres | NHL | 34 | 3 | 4 | 7 | 0 | — | — | — | — | — |
| 1971–72 | Cincinnati Swords | AHL | 35 | 14 | 14 | 28 | 10 | — | — | — | — | — |
| 1972–73 | Buffalo Sabres | NHL | 45 | 3 | 3 | 6 | 4 | — | — | — | — | — |
| 1973–74 | Buffalo Sabres | NHL | 5 | 0 | 1 | 1 | 0 | — | — | — | — | — |
| 1973–74 | Cincinnati Swords | AHL | 69 | 22 | 35 | 57 | 17 | 5 | 0 | 3 | 3 | 0 |
| 1974–75 | Richmond Robins | AHL | 71 | 21 | 32 | 53 | 31 | 7 | 2 | 3 | 5 | 6 |
| 1975–76 | Indianapolis Racers | WHA | 55 | 11 | 14 | 25 | 8 | — | — | — | — | — |
| 1975–76 | Mohawk Valley Comets | NAHL | 11 | 6 | 7 | 13 | 0 | 4 | 1 | 2 | 3 | 2 |
| 1976–77 | Mohawk Valley Comets | NAHL | 73 | 26 | 57 | 83 | 18 | 5 | 4 | 2 | 6 | 2 |
| 1977–78 | San Francisco Shamrocks | PHL | 42 | 27 | 33 | 60 | 12 | — | — | — | — | — |
| 1978–79 | Tucson Rustlers | PHL | 29 | 15 | 20 | 35 | 0 | — | — | — | — | — |
| 1978–79 | Erie Blades | NEHL | 19 | 6 | 10 | 16 | 6 | — | — | — | — | — |
| 1978–79 | Muskegon Mohawks | IHL | 3 | 4 | 3 | 7 | 0 | — | — | — | — | — |
| WHA totals | | | 55 | 11 | 14 | 25 | 8 | — | — | — | — | — |
| NHL totals | | | 100 | 8 | 10 | 18 | 10 | — | — | — | — | — |
