= Findlay Warriors =

- City: Findlay, Ohio
- League: Continental Hockey League
- Operated: 1983–1984
- Colors: black, white

Franchise history
- 1983–1984: Findlay Warriors
- 1985–1987: Dayton Jets
- 1987–1989: Miami Valley Sabres

The Findlay Warriors were an American semi-professional ice hockey team located in Findlay, Ohio. The team was in operation during the 1983–84 season in the Continental Hockey League.

== History ==
Full results for the team and the league are unavailable. On February 10, Findlay possessed a record of 6–22 and were last in the league standings. It's unclear if the team played its entire schedule of 40 games before suspending play. After sitting out all of the following year, the franchise was moved to Dayton and became the Jets.
