= Michigan Stars =

Michigan Stars may refer to:

- Michigan Stars (AAHL), defunct AAHL franchise
- Michigan Stars (Midwest Hockey League), a former member of the Midwest Hockey League
- Michigan Stars FC, a professional soccer team in the National Independent Soccer Association
