= Dave McLelland =

Canadian ice hockey player

- Born: November 20, 1952 (age 73) Penticton, British Columbia, Canada
- Height: 5 ft 9 in (175 cm)
- Weight: 165 lb (75 kg; 11 st 11 lb)
- Position: Goaltender
- Caught: Left
- Played for: Vancouver Canucks
- NHL draft: 83rd overall, 1972; Vancouver Canucks
- Playing career: 1972–1975

David McLelland (born November 20, 1952) is a Canadian former professional ice hockey goaltender who played two games in the National Hockey League with the Vancouver Canucks, on March 25 and March 31, 1973. The rest of his professional career was spent in the minor leagues, primarily with the Des Moines Capitols of the International Hockey League, before retiring in 1975.

== Career statistics ==
=== Regular season and playoffs ===
			Regular season									Playoffs
Season	Team	League	GP	W	L	T	MIN	GA	SO	GAA	SV%	GP	W	L	MIN	GA	SO	GAA	SV%
1968–69	Penticton Broncos	BCJHL	32	—	—	—	1920	125	4	—	—	—	—	—	—	—	—	—	—
1969–70	New Westminster Royals	BCJHL	—	—	—	—	—	—	—	—	—	—	—	—	—	—	—	—	—
1970–71	Penticton Broncos	BCJHL	58	36	17	4	3460	142	2	2.46	—	—	—	—	—	—	—	—	—
1971–72	Brandon Wheat Kings	WCJHL	65	—	—	—	3778	285	1	4.53	—	11	—	—	662	54	0	4.89	—
1972–73	Vancouver Canucks	NHL	2	1	1	0	120	10	0	5.00	.857	—	—	—	—	—	—	—	—
1972–73	Des Moines Capitols	IHL	2	0	1	0	84	13	0	9.28	—	—	—	—	—	—	—	—	—
1972–73	Seattle Totems	WHL	6	0	1	0	141	11	0	4.68	.887	—	—	—	—	—	—	—	—
1973–74	Des Moines Capitols	IHL	55	—	—	—	3071	146	1	2.85	—	9	8	1	540	14	2	1.55	—
1973–74	Des Moines Capitols	IHL	32	—	—	—	1705	94	1	3.31	—	2	0	2	120	9	0	4.50	—
NHL totals			2	1	1	0	120	10	0	5.00	.857	—	—	—	—	—	—	—	—

- All statistics are taken from NHL.com
