= Lincoln Park Community Center =

Community center, sports arena, and events complex in Lincoln Park, Michigan

- Interactive map of Lincoln Park Community Center
- Address: 3525 Dix Highway
- Location: Lincoln Park, Michigan
- Coordinates: 42.23383°N 83.19326°W
- Owner: City of Lincoln Park

Construction
- Opened: 1972

Tenants
- Lincoln Park Patriots (AAHL) (1988–1989); Motor City Muskies (MIHL) (2025–present); Mustang Fence (OFHL) (2025–present)

The Lincoln Park Community Center is a community center, hockey arena, and events complex located in Lincoln Park, Michigan. The arena is home to the Skate Company Skating Club which has been a tenant in the arena since its founding in 1975 and the Motor City Muskies semi-professional hockey team since 2025. The arena was also the former home of the Lincoln Park Patriots of the All-American Hockey League from 1988 to 1989.

== History ==
The arena first opened in 1972 with a community pool first opening in the complex followed by the hockey arena. From the late 1970s to 1980, the arena hosted several Big Time Wrestling professional wrestling events. Several more wrestling promotions began using the venue including Mid-West Championship Wrestling, later Insane Championship Wrestling, from 1994 to 2000, NWA Sabu in 1994,, Xtreme Intense Championship Wrestling (XICW) and Horror Slam Wrestling beginning in 2019, and Luna's Championship Wrestling (LCW) beginning in 2024. On August 5, 2023, ICW No Holds Barred held ICW No Holds Barred Vs. Detroit at the arena which featured Matt Tremont defending the IWTV Independent World Championship against Malcolm Monroe III. On April 19, 2025, it was announced that the newly-formed Motor City Muskies would be playing their home games at the arena beginning in the 2025–26 American Premier Hockey League (APHL) season.
