= Bob Janecyk =

American ice hockey player (born 1957)

- Born: May 18, 1957 (age 69) Chicago, Illinois, U.S.
- Height: 6 ft 1 in (185 cm)
- Weight: 180 lb (82 kg; 12 st 12 lb)
- Position: Goaltender
- Caught: Left
- Played for: Chicago Black Hawks; Los Angeles Kings
- NHL draft: Undrafted
- Playing career: 1979–1989

Robert T. Janecyk (born May 18, 1957) is an American former professional ice hockey goaltender who played 110 games in the National Hockey League for the Los Angeles Kings and Chicago Black Hawks between 1984 and 1988.

== Career ==
Janecyk attended Marist High School and played for Chicago State University in his hometown from 1976 to 1978. He turned professional with the Fort Wayne Komets, then played in the American Hockey League for the New Brunswick Hawks, going 11-2 in the 1982 playoffs as the team captured the AHL's Calder Cup.

Janecyk made his NHL debut with the Black Hawks during the 1983–84 season, appearing in eight games. A trade on the day of the 1984 NHL entry draft sent Chicago's first, third and fourth-round selections plus Janecyk to the Los Angeles Kings for their first and fourth-round picks. Chicago selected Ed Olczyk second overall, while the Kings used the fourth-round pick to select Tom Glavine, a future member of the National Baseball Hall of Fame and Museum.

Janecyk received more playing time out of the change of teams. He started in goal 89 times for Los Angeles the next two seasons, plus three games of the 1985 Stanley Cup playoffs. Two of those games went to overtime, but Janecyk and the Kings ended up eliminated by Wayne Gretzky and the Edmonton Oilers, who went on to win the Stanley Cup.

== Personal life ==
Janecyk's son Adam Janecyk was a goalie for the University of Michigan's hockey team from 2010 to 2014.

== Career statistics ==
=== Regular season and playoffs ===
			Regular season									Playoffs
Season	Team	League	GP	W	L	T	MIN	GA	SO	GAA	SV%	GP	W	L	MIN	GA	SO	GAA	SV%
1975–76	Chicago State University	NCAA-II	—	—	—	—	—	—	—	—	—	—	—	—	—	—	—	—	—
1976–77	Chicago State University	NCAA-II	—	—	—	—	—	—	—	—	—	—	—	—	—	—	—	—	—
1977–78	Chicago State University	NCAA-II	—	—	—	—	—	—	—	—	—	—	—	—	—	—	—	—	—
1978–79	Chicago State University	NCAA-II	—	—	—	—	—	—	—	—	—	—	—	—	—	—	—	—	—
1979–80	Flint Generals	IHL	2	—	—	—	119	5	0	2.53	—	—	—	—	—	—	—	—	—
1979–80	Chicago Cardinals	CnHL	1	0	1	0	60	6	0	6.00	—	—	—	—	—	—	—	—	—
1979–80	Fort Wayne Komets	IHL	40	—	—	—	2208	128	1	3.48	—	3	—	—	89	4	0	2.70	—
1980–81	New Brunswick Hawks	AHL	34	11	18	1	1915	131	0	4.10	.853	—	—	—	—	—	—	—	—
1981–82	New Brunswick Hawks	AHL	53	32	13	7	3224	153	2	2.85	—	14	11	2	818	32	1	2.35	—
1982–83	Springfield Indians	AHL	47	19	24	4	2754	167	3	3.64	.888	—	—	—	—	—	—	—	—
1983–84	Chicago Black Hawks	NHL	8	2	3	1	410	28	0	4.10	.882	—	—	—	—	—	—	—	—
1983–84	Springfield Indians	AHL	30	14	11	4	1664	94	0	3.39	—	—	—	—	—	—	—	—	—
1984–85	Los Angeles Kings	NHL	52	23	21	8	3053	186	2	3.66	.877	3	0	3	183	10	0	3.28	.899
1985–86	Los Angeles Kings	NHL	38	14	16	4	2072	162	0	4.69	.855	—	—	—	—	—	—	—	—
1986–87	Los Angeles Kings	NHL	7	4	3	0	419	34	0	4.87	.847	—	—	—	—	—	—	—	—
1987–88	Los Angeles Kings	NHL	5	1	4	0	303	23	0	4.56	.861	—	—	—	—	—	—	—	—
1987–88	New Haven Nighthawks	AHL	37	19	13	3	2162	125	1	3.47	.855	—	—	—	—	—	—	—	—
1988–89	Los Angeles Kings	NHL	1	0	0	0	30	2	0	4.01	.909	—	—	—	—	—	—	—	—
1988–89	New Haven Nighthawks	AHL	34	14	13	6	1992	131	1	3.95	.874	—	—	—	—	—	—	—	—
NHL totals			111	44	47	13	6286	435	2	4.15	.867	3	0	3	183	10	0	3.28	.899
