= Danny Gloor =

Canadian ice hockey player (born 1952)

- Born: December 4, 1952 (age 73) Mitchell, Ontario, Canada
- Height: 5 ft 9 in (175 cm)
- Weight: 170 lb (77 kg; 12 st 2 lb)
- Position: Left wing
- Shot: Left
- Played for: Vancouver Canucks
- NHL draft: 99th overall, 1977; Vancouver Canucks
- Playing career: 1972–1979

Dan Harold Gloor (born December 4, 1952) is a Canadian former professional ice hockey player. He played two games in the National Hockey League with the Vancouver Canucks, who selected him in the 1972 NHL amateur draft, and played several years in the minor Central Hockey League. Gloor also spent one season in Austria with Innsbrucker EV and retired in 1979. In 1973 he won the Gary F. Longman Memorial Trophy as the top rookie in the International Hockey League. His two games with the Canucks came in January 1974: his debut was against the California Golden Seals on January 11, and he played the next night against the New York Rangers before returning to the Seattle Totems of the minor Western Hockey League for the rest of the season.

== Career statistics ==
=== Regular season and playoffs ===
			Regular season					Playoffs
Season	Team	League	GP	G	A	Pts	PIM	GP	G	A	Pts	PIM
1968–69	Stratford Warriors	CJBHL	—	—	—	—	—	—	—	—	—	—
1969–70	Peterborough Petes	OHA	54	38	37	75	17	6	3	5	8	4
1970–71	Peterborough Petes	OHA	48	21	48	69	15	5	1	1	2	0
1971–72	Peterborough Petes	OHA	63	24	37	61	37	15	4	6	10	6
1972–73	Des Moines Capitols	IHL	73	42	51	93	45	3	0	1	1	0
1973–74	Seattle Totems	WHL	76	36	48	84	26	—	—	—	—	—
1973–74	Vancouver Canucks	NHL	2	0	0	0	0	—	—	—	—	—
1974–75	Seattle Totems	CHL	73	21	36	57	28	—	—	—	—	—
1975–76	Tulsa Oilers	CHL	65	23	48	71	16	9	4	3	7	0
1976–77	Tulsa Oilers	CHL	76	33	43	76	18	9	4	5	9	4
1977–78	Innsbrucker EV	AUT	33	23	25	48	68	—	—	—	—	—
1978–79	Phoenix Roadrunners	PHL	40	11	21	32	30	—	—	—	—	—
CHL totals			214	77	127	204	62	18	8	8	16	4
NHL totals			2	0	0	0	0	—	—	—	—	—
