= Springfield Capitols =

- City: Springfield, Illinois
- League: All-American Hockey League
- Founded: 1988
- Folded: 1989
- Colors: Black/Yellow/White

Franchise history
- 1988–1989: Springfield Capitols

The Springfield Capitols were an American ice hockey team in Springfield, Illinois. They played in the All-American Hockey League in the 1988–89 season.

As a result of the AAHL folding after the 1988–89 season, the Capitols folded in June 1989 and did not resume play in any other leagues.

== Season-by-season record ==
| Season | GP | W | L | T | Pts | Standing | Playoffs |
|---|---|---|---|---|---|---|---|
| 1988–89 | 35 | 21 | 13 | 1 | 43 | 2nd | Won Finals vs. Miami Valley Sabres |
