= Ice Chateau =

Ice arena in Illinois, United States

Coordinates: 39°47′40.2″N 89°42′19.8″W

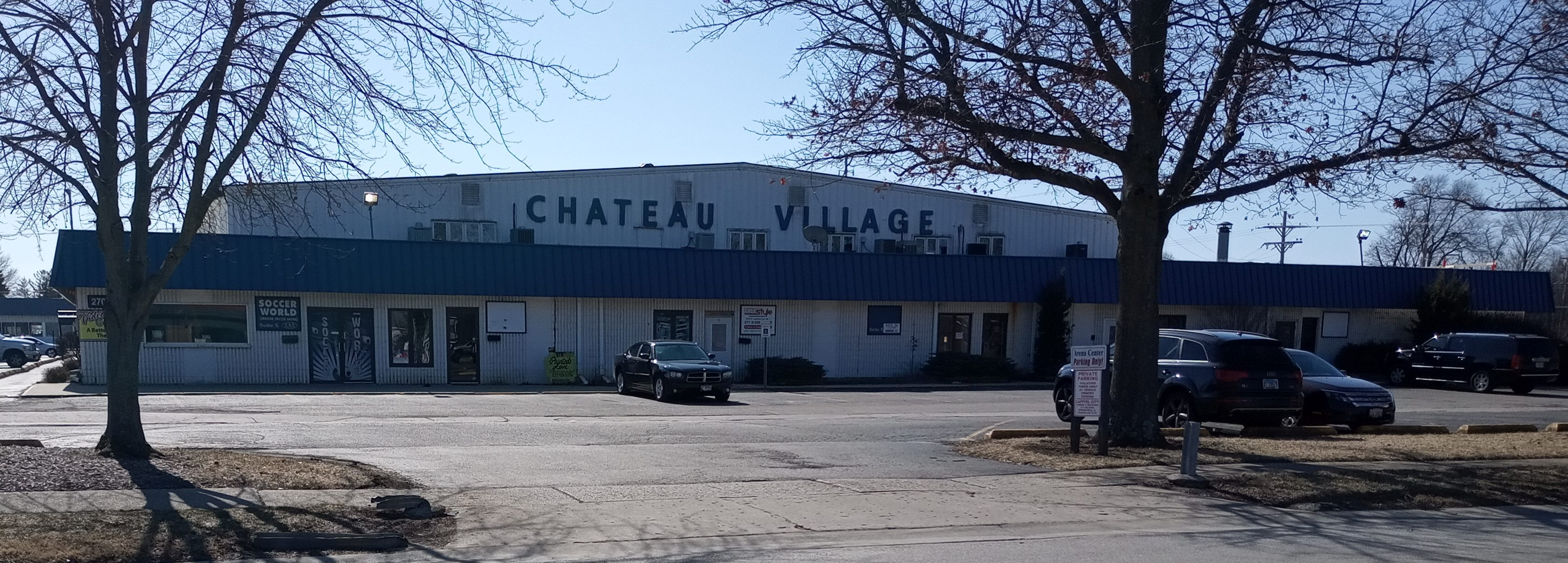
- Former site of Ice Chateau in 2020
- Interactive map of Ice Chateau
- Location: 2700 W. Lawrence St. Springfield, IL 62704
- Surface: 200' x 85'(hockey)

Construction
- Opened: 1972
- Closed: 1984

Tenants
- Springfield Kings (CnHL) (1976–84); Lincoln Land High School Hockey League (LLHH)

The Ice Chateau was a multi-purpose ice arena and recreational facility located in Springfield, Illinois.

It was the home of the Springfield Kings of the Continental Hockey League (CnHL). The Ice Chateau was also home to several Lincoln Land High School Hockey League (LLHH) and youth ice hockey teams. The facility also hosted concerts and other events. The facility closed in 1984 and was converted to an indoor soccer facility.
