= All American Hockey League =

All American Hockey League may refer to:

- All-American Hockey League (1987–89)
- All American Hockey League (2008–2011)
