= Cow Palace =

Indoor arena in Daly City, California, US

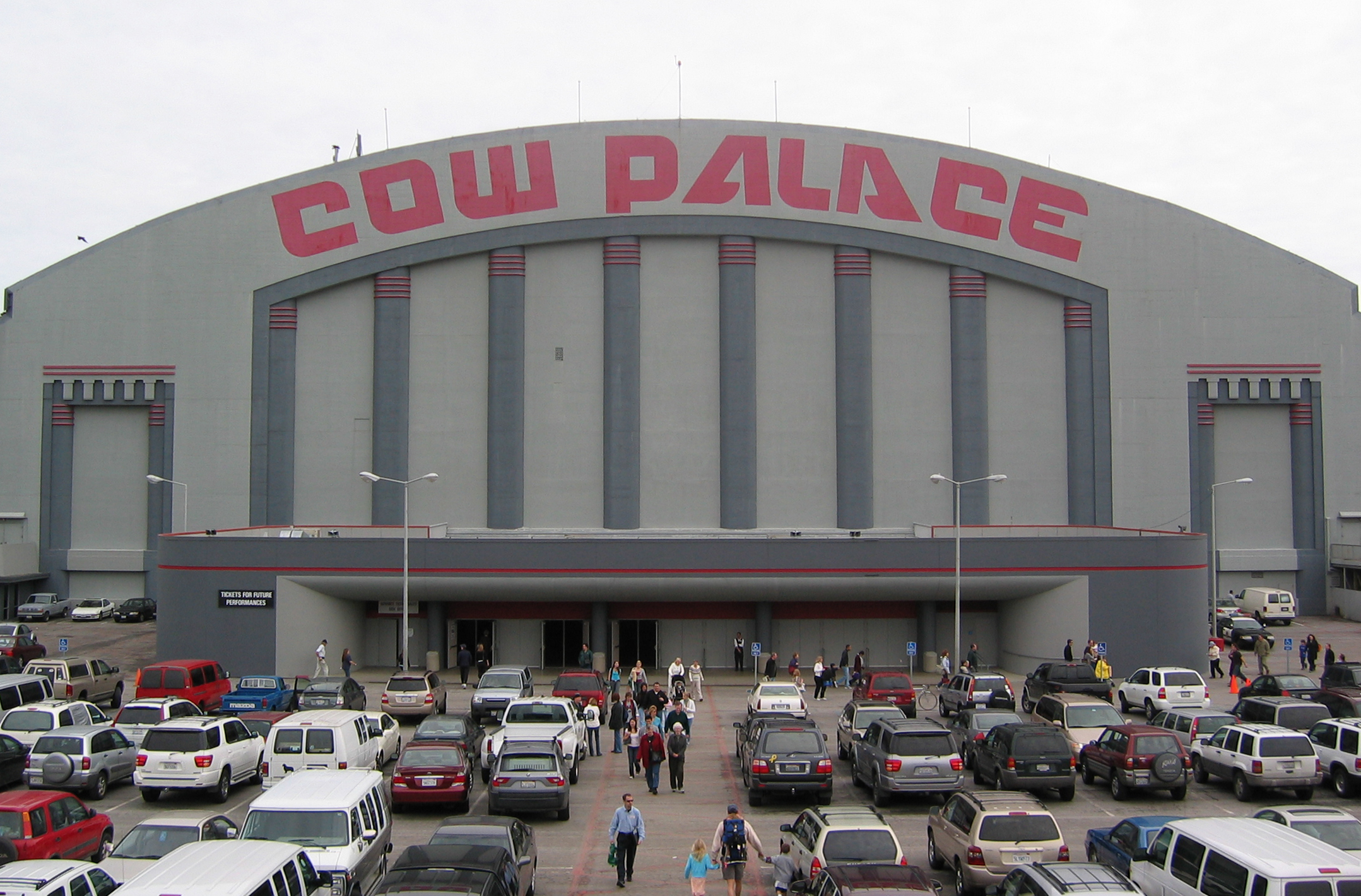
- Interactive map of Cow Palace
- Former names: California State Livestock Pavilion (1941–1944)
- Address: 2600 Geneva Avenue
- Location: Daly City, California, U.S.
- Coordinates: 37°42′24″N 122°25′7″W
- Owner: California Department of Food and Agriculture, 1-A District Agricultural Association
- Operator: California Department of Food and Agriculture, 1-A District Agricultural Association
- Capacity: Basketball: 14,000; Ice hockey: 13,550; Concerts: 16,500
- Surface: Multi-surface
- Public transit: Sunnydale

Construction
- Opened: April 20, 1941; 85 years ago

Tenants
- San Francisco Seals (WHL) (1961–1966); San Francisco Saints (ABL) (1961–1962); San Francisco Warriors (NBA) (1962–1964, 1966–1971); San Jose Earthquakes (NASL) (1975–1984); San Francisco Shamrocks (PHL) (1977–1978); San Francisco Fog (MISL) (1980–1981); San Jose Sharks (NHL) (1991–1993); San Francisco Spiders (IHL) (1995–1996); San Jose Wolves (AIFA) (2010); San Francisco Bulls (ECHL) (2012–2014)

Website
- cowpalace.com

The Cow Palace (originally the California State Livestock Pavilion) is an indoor arena and events center located in Daly City, California, situated on the city's northern boundary with neighboring San Francisco. Because the boundary passes through the property, a portion of the upper parking lot is in San Francisco.

The venue first opened in 1941, and has hosted a range of events such as sports, concerts, conventions, trade shows, and political rallies.

== History ==
Completed in 1941, it hosted the San Francisco Warriors of the NBA from 1962 to 1964 and again from 1966 to 1971. The Warriors temporarily returned to the Cow Palace to host the 1975 NBA Finals as the Oakland–Alameda County Coliseum Arena was booked for an Ice Follies performance. It was the site of both the 1956 Republican National Convention and the 1964 Republican National Convention. During the 1960s and 1970s, the SF Examiner Games, a world-class indoor track and field meet, was held annually at the Cow Palace.

The Cow Palace was also an important venue for professional boxing until the early 1980s, having staged regular shows, including ten world title fights and appearances of all-time greats like Joe Louis, Sugar Ray Robinson, and Alexis Arguello. Additionally it has hosted professional wrestling and the Bay Bombers of roller derby; the Derby's world championship playoffs were held at the Cow Palace every fall beginning from 1959 through 1973, when the organization was disbanded. From 1956 until 1999, the Ringling Bros. and Barnum & Bailey Circus visited the Cow Palace, joined in later years by what is now Disney on Ice; both events were later held at Oracle Arena, where Disney on Ice still plays since the reorganisation of Feld Entertainment (which owned both).

The arena seats 11,089 for ice hockey and 12,953 for basketball. When the Warriors played there, its basketball capacity was just over 15,000. It has also been the home of the annual Grand National Rodeo, Horse & Stock Show since 1941 (except for a break from 1942 to 1945 due to World War II). The venue hosted the 1960 men's NCAA basketball Final Four and the 1967 NBA All-Star Game. Sesame Street Live has been held at the Cow Palace since the early 1980s, as has Champions on Ice. In recent years the Cow Palace has been the Bay Area stop for the Cirque du Soleil.

=== Naming ===
The idea for the arena was inspired by the popularity of the livestock pavilion at the 1915 Panama–Pacific International Exposition. San Francisco city Supervisor Franck Havenner referred derisively to the project as a "palace for cows" as early as May 1933. A headline writer reversed the phrase, thus naming it "Cow Palace".

=== During World War II ===
The arena opened in April 1941. During World War II, however, the arena was used for processing soldiers bound for the Pacific Theater. In the following years, it hosted hockey and basketball games, wrestling and boxing matches, concerts, roller derby and political events, most notably the 1956 and 1964 Republican National Conventions. The arena is still used for the Grand National Rodeo and other events.

=== Possible sale ===
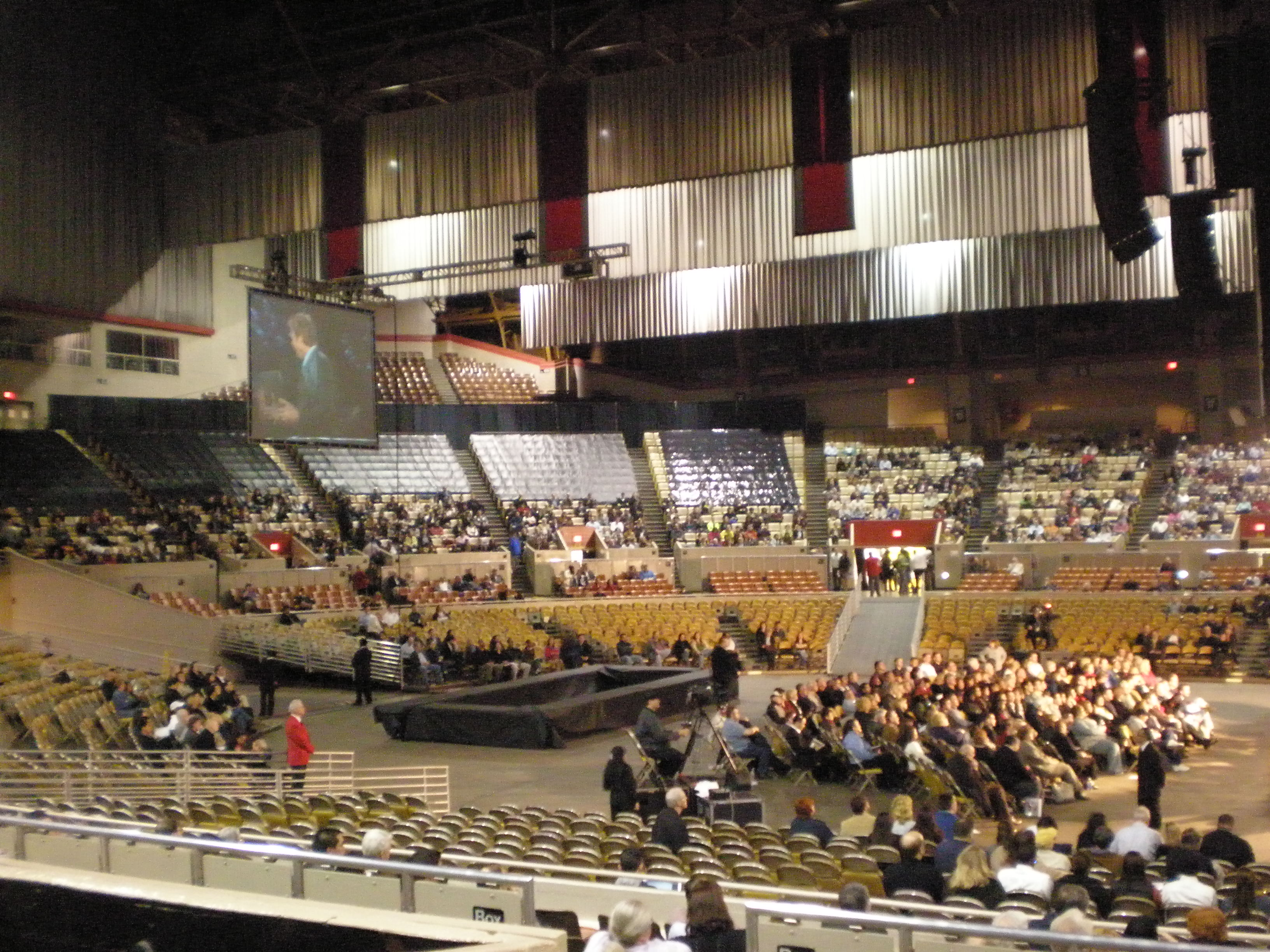
Cow Palace interior (set up for an event in 2009)

In the spring of 2008, State Senator Leland Yee advanced legislation to allow Daly City to purchase the Cow Palace from the California Department of Food and Agriculture's Division of Fairs and Expositions in order to develop housing, basic amenities, and possibly a school for the surrounding area. However, the legislation was opposed by groups that regularly use the venue and other California citizens outside Daly City.

On September 9, 2008, Governor Arnold Schwarzenegger vetoed this proposed sale of the Cow Palace overflow parking lot. Following the 2008 publicity associated with Leland Yee's failed bill, the Cow Palace board of directors entered exclusive negotiations with Cypress Equities for a 60-year lease to develop the 13-acre (5.3 ha) proposed by Daly City. Due to the lack of progress, this agreement was subsequently terminated and negotiations then commenced with a Marin County-based developer in early 2010.

== Sports ==
=== Professional and college basketball ===
The San Francisco Warriors of the National Basketball Association called the Cow Palace home from 1962 to 1964 and from 1966 to 1971. From 1964 to 1966, the Warriors played predominantly at the San Francisco Civic Auditorium. The franchise then moved across the bay to the new Oakland Coliseum Arena and changed their name to Golden State Warriors. In 2019, the Warriors moved to the Chase Center in San Francisco.

The Warriors lost to the Boston Celtics in the 1964 NBA Finals. The 1967 NBA Finals between San Francisco and the Philadelphia 76ers saw three games held at the Cow Palace. The two NBA Finals games hosted by the Warriors in their 1974–75 championship season were also held at the Cow Palace because of other events at the Oakland Coliseum.

=== Professional football ===
In 2010, the Cow Palace once again had a regular sports tenant when the American Indoor Football Association's San Jose Wolves kicked off. However, the next year they would move to Stockton as the independent Stockton Wolves.

=== Professional soccer ===
On and off between 1975 and 1984, the San Jose/Golden Bay Earthquakes of the NASL played indoor soccer at the Cow Palace, including hosting the 1975 NASL indoor championship game, which they won 8–5 over the Tampa Bay Rowdies. The 'Quakes spent several seasons playing at the Oakland Coliseum Arena before splitting time between the two arenas for the 1983–84 NASL Indoor season.

The Major Indoor Soccer League came to the Cow Palace for the 1980–81 season, when David Schoenstadt relocated his Detroit Lightning there, renaming them the San Francisco Fog. After a dismal season with an 11–29 record and less than five thousand fans per game, Schoenstadt moved the franchise again, this time to Kemper Arena in Kansas City, Missouri, where the team flourished as the Kansas City Comets.

=== Professional ice hockey ===
The San Francisco Shamrocks (PHL) called the Cow Palace home from 1977 to 1979. They won the championship their first season, but ended up disbanding in January 1979 part way through their second season.

It also hosted the San Jose Sharks of the NHL from 1991 to 1993 before the completion of their new home, the San Jose Arena. From 1991 to 1993, the Sharks sold out every game played at the building. It was one of the last buildings to house a smaller than NHL-regulation rink. The NHL had previously rejected the building in 1967 as a home for the expansion California Seals franchise, who instead played home games out of the Oakland–Alameda County Coliseum Arena.

San Jose lost their first game at the Cow Palace to the Vancouver Canucks 5–2 on October 5, 1991. Wayne Presley scored the first Sharks goal at the arena. Three nights later, San Jose won their first game in franchise history there, a 4–3 win over the Calgary Flames.

The Sharks' second season in the Cow Palace included a 17-game losing streak and a league record 71 losses. The Sharks ended their run at the Cow Palace at the conclusion of the 1992–93 season with a 3–2 loss to eventual Campbell Conference champion Los Angeles on April 10, 1993. The team moved to the new San Jose Arena (now the SAP Center) to start 1993–94 after going 22–56–4 at their first home.

At the Cow Palace, the Sharks recorded the franchise's first win, shutout (Artūrs Irbe) and hat trick (Rob Gaudreau). The team also introduced their mascot, S.J. Sharkie, on the Cow Palace ice in mid-1992 when he climbed out of the front of a Zamboni. He later bungee-jumped from the rafters near the end of the first season.

In 1995, the IHL's San Francisco Spiders played their only season at the Cow Palace. Several players who played for the Sharks during their Cow Palace years suited up for the Spiders that year. Due to poor attendance, the team ceased operations at the end of the 1995–96 season.

On September 27, 2011, the ECHL formally announced that pro hockey would return to the Cow Palace after a 16-year hiatus with the arrival of the San Francisco Bulls the following fall. To accommodate the new team its ownership spent $2 million on renovating the team locker rooms, upgrading the concession stands, food improvements and installing new widescreen HD monitors to observe gameplay, installing a new ice system (as the old ammonia-based system that was in place for the Seals, Shamrocks, Sharks & Spiders had since become outdated and illegal) and a new custom-made wraparound LED video scoreboard with its game presentation system and ten sets of Custom Piston speakers from Claire Brothers Audio formerly used by AC/DC. The center hung video board has a 360° view for game presentation and full timekeeping and statistics. The new Colosseo Cube scoreboard – made by Colosseo USA – was custom built in order to agree with some of the weight bearing limitations for the roof. The engineers designed new structural steel beams and had them installed in the rafters to provide the additional support required. The Bulls folded on January 28, 2014, 40 games into their second season.

=== Professional tennis ===
From 1974 to 1989, the Cow Palace was the site of the Pacific Coast Championships, a yearly tournament on the men's professional tennis tour. Some of the biggest names in tennis played there, such as Jimmy Connors, John McEnroe and Ivan Lendl.

=== Professional wrestling ===
The Palace has also hosted professional wrestling events under various promoters, most notably Roy Shire, who ran cards there from the early 1960s to 1981, oftentimes to sold-out houses headlined by Ray Stevens, Pat Patterson and others. After Shire ended operations, other promotions such as World Wrestling Federation (WWF) and World Championship Wrestling (WCW) moved in. Notable cards included WCW's SuperBrawl in 1997, 1998, and 2000 and WWE's No Way Out in 2004. In 2018, the Cow Palace hosted New Japan Pro-Wrestling's G1 Special in San Francisco.

On March 1 and 3, 2023, the Cow Palace hosted AEW Dynamite and AEW Rampage, leading into AEW Revolution, which was hosted at the Chase Center in San Francisco.

== Events ==
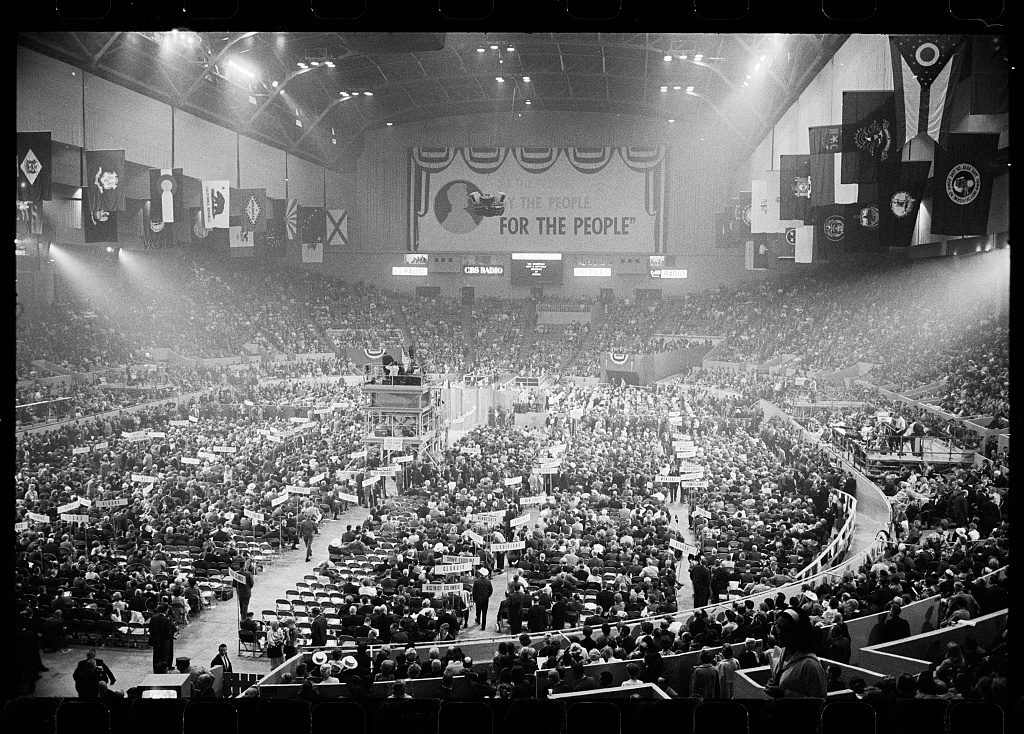
1964 Republican National Convention

=== Politics ===
The Cow Palace twice hosted the Republican National Convention. Republicans gathered at the Cow Palace for the 1956 Republican National Convention to renominate Dwight D. Eisenhower for president and Richard Nixon for vice president. The ticket won in a landslide.

The Republicans came back eight years later for the 1964 Republican National Convention, at which Barry Goldwater was nominated for president and William Miller was nominated for vice president. They lost to Lyndon Johnson and Hubert Humphrey, also in a landslide.

=== Concerts ===
Selected musical artists and performances at the Cow Palace
Group	Date(s)	Concert	Notes
The Beatles	August 19, 1964	The Beatles' 1964 North American tour	The Beatles' 1964 show in the Cow Palace was the first show of the group's 1964 summer tour of the United States and Canada.
The Who	November 20, 1973	The Who Tour 1973	During the concert, drummer Keith Moon passed out from an overdose of horse tranquilizers. A fan of the band, Scot Halpin, completed the group's set that evening.
Grateful Dead	December 31, 1976	—	Double bill for the Grateful Dead and Santana. The groups recorded a live album during this performance, released as Live at the Cow Palace.
Santana	December 31, 1976	—	Double bill for the Grateful Dead and Santana. The groups recorded a live album during this performance, released as Live at the Cow Palace.
Kiss	August 16, 1977	Love Gun Tour	Kiss dedicated "Rock and Roll All Nite" to Elvis Presley, who had died that day.
Cheap Trick	August 16, 1977	Love Gun Tour	Kiss dedicated "Rock and Roll All Nite" to Elvis Presley, who had died that day.
Neil Young & Crazy Horse	October 22, 1978	—	Concert film Rust Never Sleeps filmed there and some of the songs on the album Live Rust were recorded there.
The Runaways	December 31, 1978	—	Final concert for the group before their break-up in April 1979. Sammy Hagar headlined the show.
Sammy Hagar	December 31, 1978	—	Final concert for the group before their break-up in April 1979. Sammy Hagar headlined the show.
Neil Diamond	February 28, 1979–March 1, 1979	North American Tour 78–79	Neil Diamond fell on stage and couldn't get up. He underwent a 14-hour surgery to remove a nonmalignant tumor located close to his spine.
U2	June 4, 1986	Amnesty International: A Conspiracy of Hope Benefit Concert	Sponsored by Amnesty International and headlined by U2 and Sting. Other featured performers included Bryan Adams, Jackson Browne, Peter Gabriel, Lou Reed, Joan Baez, and The Neville Brothers.
Sting	June 4, 1986	Amnesty International: A Conspiracy of Hope Benefit Concert	Sponsored by Amnesty International and headlined by U2 and Sting. Other featured performers included Bryan Adams, Jackson Browne, Peter Gabriel, Lou Reed, Joan Baez, and The Neville Brothers.
Van Halen	October 31, 1986–November 3, 1986	5150 Tour	Van Halen played four consecutive shows on their final stop of their 5150 tour. Before the last show of the tour on November 3, Eddie Van Halen cut his hair into a braided rat tail, while Alex Van Halen shaved his head bald.
Neil Young	November 26, 1989	1989 Loma Prieta earthquake Relief Concert	Featuring Bob Hope, Neil Young, Steve Miller Band, Eddie Money, and Crosby, Stills & Nash.
Nirvana	April 9, 1993	—	Benefit concert for Bosnian rape victims, along with several other acts such as the Breeders and L7. The 1993 concert was one of the few shows Nirvana had played that year where most of the material off their final album, In Utero, were played live and the last time for some older songs, such as "Negative Creep" and "Love Buzz." As of April 2016, a full video of the concert is on YouTube, along with an interview.

=== Rodeos and livestock expositions ===
The Cow Palace is officially the 1-A District Agricultural Association, a State agency of the California Department of Food and Agriculture's Division of Fairs and Expositions. It has extensive stable and barn facilities for animal events, which are used for the annual Grand National Rodeo and occasionally for other events. It also used to host events on the now-defunct BRO (Bull Riders Only) tour.

=== Media ===
In 1982, the Cow Palace stood in for the Houston Coliseum when the 1962 barbecue welcoming NASA to Houston was recreated for the movie The Right Stuff. The explosion of the starship USS Reliant, used in the movie Star Trek II: The Wrath of Khan, was filmed in the Cow Palace auditorium. The pyrotechnic charge for the shot was suspended over the auditorium floor and the explosion was filmed from below.

=== Conventions ===
On 15 June 2024, Open Sauce, a STEM fair stylized like Maker Faire, hosted its 2nd convention in the Cow Palace. The event drew over 25,000 attendees and 550 exhibitors. The purpose of Open Sauce was to fill the void left by Maker Faire's original discontinuation in 2019, which has since been revived in 2023 under the same name, but more of a STEM-focused event fair for exhibitors.

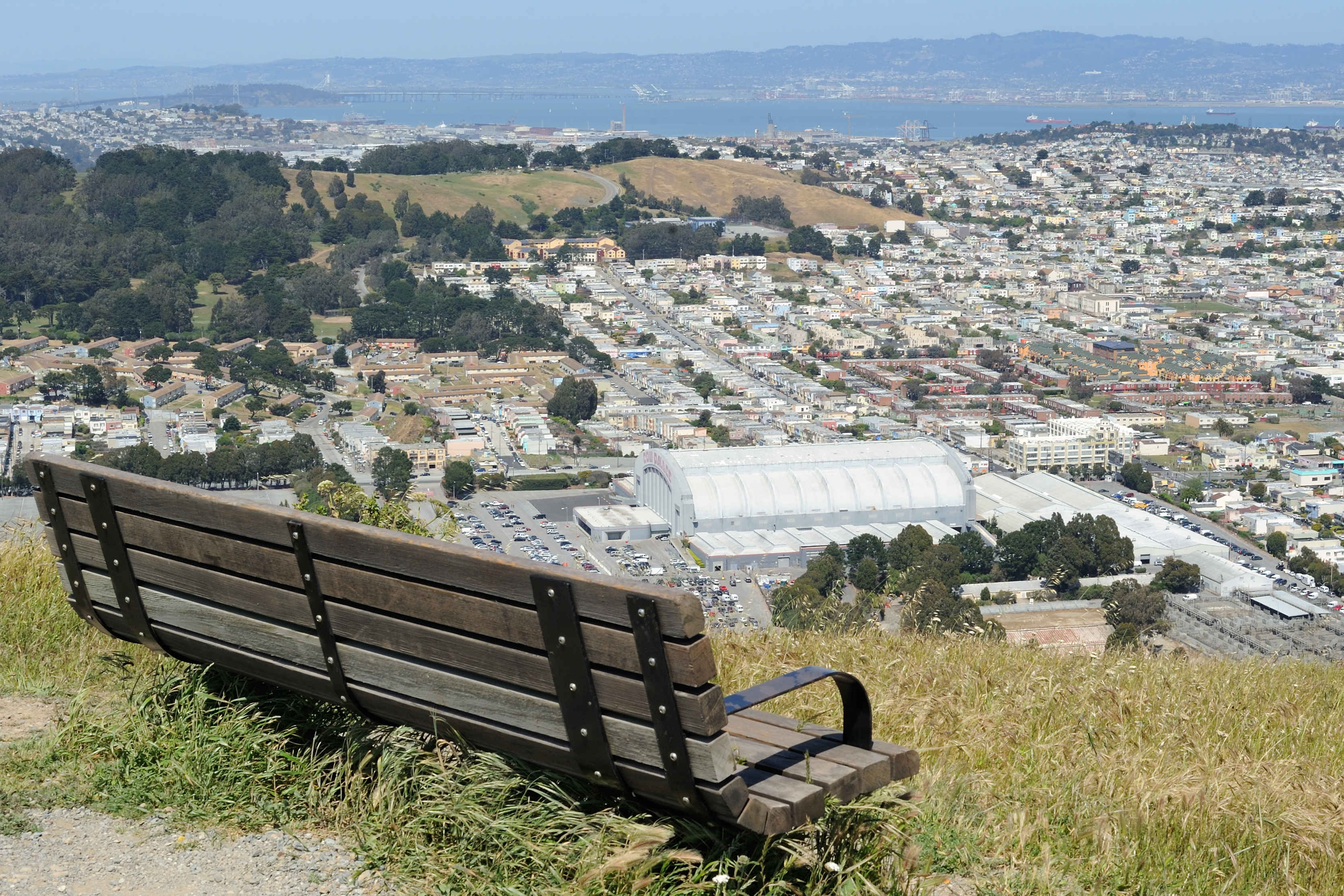
View of Cow Palace and Visitacion Valley from San Bruno Mountain State Park

== See also ==
- List of convention centers in the United States
- List of indoor arenas in the United States
- List of rodeos

Events and tenants
Preceded by Philadelphia Arena War Memorial Gymnasium & San Francisco Civic Auditorium	Home of the San Francisco Warriors; 1962–64; 1966–71	Succeeded by War Memorial Gymnasium & San Francisco Civic Auditorium Oakland–Alameda County Coliseum Arena
Preceded by first arena	Home of the San Jose Sharks; 1991–1993	Succeeded by SAP Center
Preceded by Freedom Hall	NCAA Men's Division I Basketball Tournament; Finals Venue; 1960	Succeeded by Municipal Auditorium
Preceded by Cincinnati Gardens	Host of the NBA All-Star Game; 1967	Succeeded by Madison Square Garden
