= Wagon Wheel Resort =

Former resort complex in Rockton, Illinois

The Wagon Wheel Resort was a resort complex in Rockton, Illinois, United States. Founded by Walt Williamson in 1936 as a filling station and small hamburger stand, it grew into a 314-acre (127 ha) property with lodging, restaurants, entertainment venues, and sports facilities. Its Wagon Wheel Ice Palace became a prominent figure-skating training center under coach Slavka Kohout, whose students there included Olympic medalist Janet Lynn. The resort closed in 1989; fires damaged the abandoned complex, and its remaining principal buildings were demolished in 2004.

== History ==
Williamson opened a filling station and seven-seat hamburger stand on the site in 1936. An expanded Wagon Wheel opened on December 1, 1944. A fire damaged the new building later that month, but it reopened ten days afterward. By May 1950, the resort's lodging had 55 rooms, four apartments, and five wings.

The property eventually covered 314 acres. Its facilities included a hotel, restaurants, an airstrip, golf course, swimming pools, bowling alley, theater, ski hill, lake, specialty shops, miniature railway, and multiple ice rinks. The resort also operated the Wagon Wheel Playhouse, a dinner theater, and hosted hockey, curling, and figure-skating programs.

== Ice sports ==
The Wagon Wheel Ice Palace opened in 1958. The rink was inaugurated on October 5 with an exhibition scrimmage by the Chicago Blackhawks, and its seating capacity was later expanded to 2,004.

=== Figure skating ===
The Wagon Wheel Figure Skating Club became a member of the United States Figure Skating Association in September 1956 and originally used the resort as its home rink. Kohout served for 17 years as the Ice Palace's chief skating instructor. In addition to coaching, she managed the rink's skating school and organized summer programs, competitions, and training for judges. A historian at Rockford's Midway Village Museum credited Kohout and Lynn with giving the rink regional and national recognition and attracting skaters and coaches from outside the area.

Lynn trained at the Wagon Wheel under Kohout before winning the bronze medal in women's singles at the 1972 Winter Olympics. Kohout's other students at the rink included national champion Gordon McKellen, and Scott Hamilton also trained there. In January 1971, the Ice Palace hosted the Midwestern Figure Skating Championships. Skating magazine reported crowds of approximately 1,500 during the competition and more than 2,500 for its standing-room-only Saturday program, at which Lynn gave exhibitions.

The figure-skating club left Rockton for Barrington, Illinois, in 1981 after the Ice Palace ceased operating, but retained the Wagon Wheel name.

=== Hockey and curling ===
The resort's senior amateur hockey team, the Wagon Wheel Cardinals, made its debut in October 1958 and won its league championship in its first season. The Cardinals won additional Interstate Ice Hockey League titles and, in 1963, the U.S. American Amateur Hockey Invitational tournament. The Ice Palace also hosted an exhibition against the Great Britain national team in 1962. A later junior team at the rink, the Rockton Wheels, competed during the 1970s. The resort's curling club was organized in 1961.

== Closure and legacy ==
Williamson died in 1975, after which the property was sold several times. The resort announced in March 1989 that it would close, and its final day of operation was July 30. Fires struck parts of the vacant complex in 1993, and the main lodge and hotel burned on January 30, 1999. The remaining resort buildings were demolished in 2004.

Several structures associated with the resort remained in other uses, including its former junior lodge, later operated as the China Palace restaurant, and portions of the golf course. The Rockton Township Historical Society has collected photographs and recollections of the resort and presented public programs about its history.
