= Kenosha Chargers =

- City: Kenosha, Wisconsin
- League: Continental Hockey League
- Operated: 1974–1981
- Home arena: Kenosha Ice Arena

Franchise history
- 1974–1975: Kenosha Flyers
- 1975–1976: Lake County Flyers
- 1976–1979: Kenosha Flyers
- 1979–1981: Kenosha Chargers

Championships
- Regular season titles: 1979–80 (tied)

The Kenosha Chargers were an American semi-professional ice hockey team located in Kenosha, Wisconsin. The team was in operation for two seasons in the Continental Hockey League. The franchise was the successor to the Kenosha Flyers and played out of the same arena. he Charger's first season met with success as the team tied for the league championship with the Springfield Kings, however, they were unable to win the championship. After the successful first season, Kenosha fell off a cliff and won just 3 of their 32 games the following season. The sudden and drastic fall drove away the fans and the franchise folded after the year.

== Season-by-season record ==
Season	GP	W	L	T	Pts	GF	GA	Place
1979–80	36	21	8	7	49	249	154	T–1st
1980–81	32	3	27	2	8	87	116	4th
