= Janesville Jets (CnHL) =

- City: Janesville, Wisconsin
- League: Continental Hockey League
- Operated: 1981–1982
- Home arena: Janesville Ice Arena
- Colors: Black and white

Franchise history
- 1981–1982: Janesville Jets
- 1982: Rock River Jets

The Janesville Jets were an American semi-professional ice hockey team located in Janesville, Wisconsin. The team was in operation for part of one season in the Continental Hockey League. Due to low attendance, the franchise was moved to Rockford, Illinois in January and became the Rock River Jets. Despite winning just 6 of their 34 games, the team did not finish last in the league. However, due to the dissolution of the Grand Rapids Grizzlies just 12 games into the season, Janesville played a shorter schedule as their remaining games with Grand Rapids were cancelled and not replaced.

== Season-by-season record ==
Season	GP	W	L	T	Pts	GF	GA	Place	Playoffs
1981–82	34	6	28	0	12	109	243	5th	missed

Note: The schedule is the result for the entire season between Janesville and Rockford.

== Players ==
None of the players for Janesville achieved any notoriety in the sport. Dave Lee was the only Jet to ever play professionally for any length of time and he retired following Janesville's lone season.
