= IIHL =

IIHL may refer to:

- International Independent Hockey League
- Irish Ice Hockey League
- International Institute of Humanitarian Law
- Israeli Institute for Hebrew Literature
