= Michel Mongeau (ice hockey) =

Canadian ice hockey player (1965–2010)

- Born: February 9, 1965 Verdun, Quebec, Canada
- Died: May 22, 2010 (aged 45) Montreal, Quebec, Canada
- Height: 5 ft 9 in (175 cm)
- Weight: 165 lb (75 kg; 11 st 11 lb)
- Position: Centre
- Shot: Left
- Played for: St. Louis Blues; Tampa Bay Lightning
- NHL draft: Undrafted
- Playing career: 1986–2004

Michel Mongeau (February 9, 1965 – May 22, 2010) was a Canadian professional ice hockey player. A centre, he played 54 games in the National Hockey League (NHL) with the St. Louis Blues and Tampa Bay Lightning. Although his NHL career was brief, Mongeau was a prolific scorer in minor league hockey, particularly in the International Hockey League (IHL), where he won the James Gatschene Memorial Trophy as the league's most valuable player in 1990–91 and was a key member of the Peoria Rivermen's Turner Cup championship team that season.

== Early life and junior career ==
Mongeau was born in Verdun, Quebec. As a youth, he played in the 1977 and 1978 Quebec International Pee-Wee Hockey Tournaments with a minor ice hockey team from Verdun.

Mongeau played four seasons of junior ice hockey with the Laval Voisins (later the Laval Titan) of the Quebec Major Junior Hockey League (QMJHL) from 1982 to 1986. His production increased dramatically each season: after recording 10 points in 24 games as a 17-year-old in 1982–83, he scored 45 goals and 94 points in 1983–84 on a Voisins team that also featured Mario Lemieux and won the President's Cup as QMJHL champions. In 1984–85, Mongeau registered 60 goals and 144 points, and in his final junior season of 1985–86 he led the newly renamed Laval Titan with 71 goals and 180 points in 72 games. Despite these totals, Mongeau went undrafted by any NHL team.

== Professional career ==
=== IHL and early NHL stints (1986–1993) ===
Mongeau turned professional in 1986–87 with the Saginaw Generals of the IHL, where he scored 42 goals and 95 points in 76 games and won the Gary F. Longman Memorial Trophy as the league's top rookie. His early professional career was then interrupted by several hernia operations, causing him to miss most of the 1987–88 season.

He resurfaced with the Flint Spirits in 1988–89, posting 41 goals and 117 points, and then joined the Peoria Rivermen for the 1989–90 season, beginning what would become a long association with the franchise. Mongeau earned his first NHL call-up with the St. Louis Blues that season, appearing in seven games and recording six points. Over the next two seasons, he continued to shuttle between the Blues and the Rivermen. The 1990–91 season was the high point of his career: with Peoria, Mongeau scored 41 goals and 106 points and won the James Gatschene Memorial Trophy as IHL MVP. He was part of the famed "MTV line" alongside captain Dave Thomlinson and Jimmy Vesey, and the Rivermen captured the Turner Cup championship while setting a professional hockey record with an 18-game winning streak under coach Bob Plager.

Mongeau played 36 games for the Blues in 1991–92, his longest NHL stint, recording 15 points. He was briefly sent to the Halifax Citadels of the American Hockey League (AHL) and the Milwaukee Admirals before appearing in four games with the Tampa Bay Lightning during the 1992–93 season, his last NHL action.

=== Facial injury and later career (1993–2004) ===
Mongeau returned to Peoria for the 1993–94 season, but his career was severely disrupted by an on-ice incident. He was cross-checked from behind by Cleveland Lumberjacks' Chris Tamer, which drove him head-first into the goal post. Mongeau suffered seven facial fractures, required three metal plates in his face, and had his jaw wired shut for a month. The injury forced him out of hockey for approximately a year. Mongeau later sued Tamer, but the first trial ended in a mistrial, and at the second trial the case was dismissed as the incident was deemed an accident.

Mongeau returned to the Rivermen for parts of two more seasons before stints with the Detroit Vipers, Phoenix Roadrunners, Milwaukee Admirals, Quebec Rafales, and Manitoba Moose in the IHL, as well as the Cornwall Aces of the AHL. He also played internationally, spending the 1998–99 season with Asiago HC in Italy's Serie A and playing for EHC Biel in Switzerland and the Diables Noirs de Tours in France. Mongeau finished his career playing Quebec semi-professional hockey, retiring around 2004.

In total, Mongeau appeared in 328 games for the Peoria Rivermen over six seasons, amassing 165 goals and 282 assists for 447 points. He was inducted into the Peoria Rivermen Hall of Fame in 2001.

== Personal life and death ==
Mongeau and his wife Chantal had two children, Alex and Catherine. He died on May 22, 2010, in Montreal, at the age of 45, after a battle with melanoma.

== Awards ==
- 1986–87 – Gary F. Longman Memorial Trophy (IHL Rookie of the Year)
- 1990–91 – James Gatschene Memorial Trophy (IHL Most Valuable Player)
- 2001 – Peoria Rivermen Hall of Fame

== Career statistics ==
=== Regular season and playoffs ===
| | | | Regular season | | | | | Playoffs |
| Season | Team | League | GP | G | A | Pts | PIM | GP | G | A | Pts | PIM |
|---|---|---|---|---|---|---|---|---|---|---|---|---|
| 1982–83 | Laval Voisins | QMJHL | 24 | 4 | 6 | 10 | 2 | 5 | 1 | 0 | 1 | 0 |
| 1983–84 | Laval Voisins | QMJHL | 60 | 45 | 49 | 94 | 30 | 10 | 4 | 5 | 9 | 2 |
| 1984–85 | Laval Voisins | QMJHL | 67 | 60 | 84 | 144 | 56 | — | — | — | — | — |
| 1985–86 | Laval Titan | QMJHL | 72 | 71 | 109 | 180 | 45 | 14 | 14 | 20 | 34 | 12 |
| 1986–87 | Saginaw Generals | IHL | 76 | 42 | 53 | 95 | 34 | 10 | 3 | 6 | 9 | 10 |
| 1988–89 | Flint Spirits | IHL | 82 | 41 | 76 | 117 | 57 | — | — | — | — | — |
| 1989–90 | Peoria Rivermen | IHL | 73 | 39 | 78 | 117 | 53 | 5 | 3 | 4 | 7 | 6 |
| 1989–90 | St. Louis Blues | NHL | 7 | 1 | 5 | 6 | 2 | 2 | 0 | 1 | 1 | 0 |
| 1990–91 | Peoria Rivermen | IHL | 73 | 41 | 65 | 106 | 114 | 19 | 10 | 16 | 26 | 32 |
| 1990–91 | St. Louis Blues | NHL | 7 | 1 | 1 | 2 | 0 | — | — | — | — | — |
| 1991–92 | Peoria Rivermen | IHL | 32 | 21 | 34 | 55 | 77 | 10 | 5 | 14 | 19 | 8 |
| 1991–92 | St. Louis Blues | NHL | 36 | 3 | 12 | 15 | 6 | — | — | — | — | — |
| 1992–93 | Halifax Citadels | AHL | 22 | 13 | 18 | 31 | 10 | — | — | — | — | — |
| 1992–93 | Milwaukee Admirals | IHL | 45 | 24 | 41 | 65 | 69 | 4 | 1 | 4 | 5 | 4 |
| 1992–93 | Tampa Bay Lightning | NHL | 4 | 1 | 1 | 2 | 2 | — | — | — | — | — |
| 1993–94 | Peoria Rivermen | IHL | 52 | 29 | 36 | 65 | 50 | — | — | — | — | — |
| 1993–94 | Cornwall Aces | AHL | 7 | 3 | 11 | 14 | 4 | — | — | — | — | — |
| 1994–95 | Peoria Rivermen | IHL | 74 | 30 | 52 | 82 | 72 | — | — | — | — | — |
| 1995–96 | Peoria Rivermen | IHL | 24 | 5 | 17 | 22 | 24 | 12 | 4 | 11 | 15 | 8 |
| 1996–97 | Detroit Vipers | IHL | 31 | 12 | 11 | 23 | 30 | — | — | — | — | — |
| 1996–97 | Phoenix Roadrunners | IHL | 16 | 4 | 10 | 14 | 8 | — | — | — | — | — |
| 1996–97 | Milwaukee Admirals | IHL | 31 | 6 | 19 | 25 | 29 | 2 | 0 | 1 | 1 | 2 |
| 1997–98 | Quebec Rafales | IHL | 34 | 5 | 12 | 17 | 18 | — | — | — | — | — |
| 1997–98 | Manitoba Moose | IHL | 43 | 12 | 22 | 34 | 24 | 3 | 0 | 1 | 1 | 6 |
| 1998–99 | Asiago HC | Italy-A | 10 | 9 | 5 | 14 | 27 | — | — | — | — | — |
| NHL totals | | | 54 | 6 | 19 | 25 | 10 | 2 | 0 | 1 | 1 | 0 |
