= Minot Maple Leafs =

- City: Minot, North Dakota
- League: Continental Hockey League
- Founded: 1985
- Folded: 1985
- Colors: Blue and White

The Minot Maple Leafs were a Continental Hockey League (CnHL) ice hockey team from Minot, North Dakota, active during the 1985–86 season. Minot was twinned with the Billings Marlboros, who shared a corporate office, but neither team was financially successful. On December 7, 1985, both teams ceased operations when neither had funds to continue playing. While there were some faint hopes that one of the teams could be sacrificed to save the other, there wasn't enough money left over for even that extreme measure. Neither team played again and the league itself folded after the season.

== Season-by-season record ==
Season	GP	W	L	T	Pts	GF	GA	Place	Playoffs
1985–86	14	4	10	0	28	–	–	withdrew	N/A

Note: Minot withdrew from the league in early December. The standings here represent their record through December 2 but its unclear if any further games were played.
