= Rock River Jets =

- City: Rockford, Illinois
- League: Continental Hockey League
- Operated: 1982

Franchise history
- 1981–1982: Janesville Jets
- 1982: Rock River Jets

The Rock River Jets (sometimes stylized as 'Rock–River Jets') were an American semi-professional ice hockey team located in Rockford, Illinois. The team was in operation for parts of two seasons in the Continental Hockey League. Due to low attendance, the Janesville Jets moved to Rockford, Illinois in January 1982 and finished out the year as the Rock River Jets. The team returned for the following year but their financial situation had not improved. Rock River lost each of its first six games that year by a combined total of 11 to 76 and then withdrew from the league.

== Season-by-season record ==
Season	GP	W	L	T	Pts	GF	GA	Place	Playoffs
1981–82	34	6	28	0	12	109	243	5th	missed
1982–83	6	0	6	0	0	11	76	withdrew	N/A

Note: The schedule is the result for the entire season between Janesville and Rockford.
