= Decatur Blues =

- City: Decatur, Illinois
- League: Continental Hockey League
- Founded: 1981
- Folded: 1984

Franchise history
- 1981–1982: Decatur Blues
- 1983–1984: Decatur Storm

The Decatur Blues were a semi-professional ice hockey team from Decatur, Illinois. The team was active for parts of three seasons in the Continental Hockey League (CnHL) in the 1980s.

The Blues were one of the worst teams in the league during their short existence. They allowed more than 10 goals against in the first season and followed that up by folding just 5 games into year two. The team was renamed as the 'Storm' for the third season and did see some improvement, but still failed to make the playoffs. The team was suspended for good in 1984 and the league dissolved two years later.

== Season-by-season record ==
Season	GP	W	L	T	Pts	GF	GA	Place	Playoffs
1981–82	37	3	34	0	6	104	379	7th	missed
1982–83	5	0	5	0	0	11	44	withdrew	N/A
1983–84	40	10	29	1	21	?	?	?	missed

Note: The final standings for all teams in 1984 is missing. Decatur finished out of the playoffs and was in either 5th- or 6th-place.
