= Kenosha Flyers =

- City: Kenosha, Wisconsin
- League: Continental Hockey League
- Operated: 1974–1981
- Home arena: Kenosha Ice Arena

Franchise history
- 1974–1975: Kenosha Flyers
- 1975–1976: Lake County Flyers
- 1976–1979: Kenosha Flyers
- 1979–1981: Kenosha Chargers

Championships
- Regular season titles: 1974–1975
- Playoff championships: 1975

The Kenosha Flyers were an American semi-professional ice hockey team located in Kenosha, Wisconsin. The franchise was in operation for seven seasons in the Continental Hockey League but spent only four as the 'Kenosha Flyers'. The team won the league championship in its first season, defeating Peoria 4–2. Unfortunately, due their home rink being unavailable, the Flyers were forced to move a few miles south to Zion, Illinois for the following season. After a year as the Lake County Flyers, the team was back in Kenosha but they couldn't recapture the magic of their first season. Kenosha progressively sank down the standings and were sold and renamed after the 1979 season.

== Season-by-season record ==
| Season | GP | W | L | T | Pts | GF | GA | Place | Playoffs |
| 1974–75 | 22 | 15 | 3 | 4 | 38 | 152 | 95 | 1st | Won Championship |
| 1975–76 | 32 | 12 | 18 | 2 | 41 | – | – | 4th | Lost Semifinals |
| 1976–77 | 32 | 13 | 18 | 1 | 25 | 187 | 228 | 3rd | None |
| 1977–78 | 34 | 17 | 14 | 3 | 37 | 199 | 189 | 4th | None |
| 1978–79 | 40 | 7 | 31 | 2 | 16 | 100 | 231 | 5th | missed |

Note: team played the 1975–76 season as the 'Lake County Flyers' due to their home rink being unavailable.

== Players ==
Most of the players never got about the senior amateur level, however, Reg Fleming and Brian Glenwright both spend time in the majors prior to appearing for the Flyers.
