= Miami Valley Sabres =

- City: Troy, Ohio
- League: AAHL
- Operated: 1982–1989
- Home arena: Hobart Arena
- Colors: Blue, white

Franchise history
- 1982-86: Troy Sabres (CnHL)
- 1986-87: Troy Sabres (AAHL)
- 1987-89: Miami Valley Sabres (AAHL)

Championships
- Regular season titles: 1988-89
- Division titles: None
- Conference titles: None
- Playoff championships: 1988-89

The Miami Valley Sabres were a minor league ice hockey team located in Troy, Ohio, that played in the All-American Hockey League.

== History ==
The team was founded in 1987 when the Troy Sabres and the nearby Dayton Jets merged their franchises to join the newly formed All-American Hockey League. The Sabres were coached by longtime IHL goalie Rick Szabo, who had joined the franchise as a goaltender during the 1983–84 season. After three seasons with the Troy Sabres, Szabo returned to the franchise after the Dayton-Troy merger and was the head coach while he also held down the starting goaltender position. The Sabres finished in third place in the AAHL with a 17-19-1 record.

With the Carolina Thunderbirds, Johnstown Chiefs, and Virginia Lancers leaving the AAHL for the newly formed ECHL (then East Coast Hockey League), and with the Michigan Stars and Port Huron Clippers folding, the AAHL was down to three teams, causing the league (and the Sabres) to lose their professional status. The Lincoln Park Patriots and Springfield Capitols were admitted into the league several weeks into the new season, giving the AAHL five teams total. The Sabres would win the regular season championship and playoffs.

With the league ceasing operations in the offseason and the Sabres not given the chance to reaffiliate with another league, the Sabres ceased operations in the summer of 1989.
