= Hammond Cardinals =

- City: Schererville, Indiana
- League: Continental Hockey League
- Operated: 1977–1978
- Home arena: Black Hawk Arena
- Colors: Red and Black

The Hammond Cardinals were an American semi-professional ice hockey team located in Schererville, Indiana. The team was in operation for one seasons in the Continental Hockey League.

== Season-by-season record ==
Season	GP	W	L	T	Pts	GF	GA	Place	Playoffs
1977-78	34	23	10	1	47	198	120	2nd	N/A

== Players ==
Most of the players who appeared for the Cardinals never made it above the semi-pro level. However, the team did sport former NHLer Reg Fleming for part of the season. He retired after the year at the age of 42.
