= Peoria Blades =

- City: Peoria, Illinois
- League: Continental Hockey League
- Founded: 1972
- Folded: 1982
- Home arena: Lakeview Park Rink
- Colors: Blue and Yellow
- General manager: Mark Olson
- Head coach: Mark Olson

Championships
- Playoff championships: 1976, 1977, 1978

The Peoria Blades were an American semi-professional ice hockey team located in Peoria, Illinois. The team played in the Continental Hockey League for 10 seasons and was the most successful franchise in the history of the league, winning 3 championships.

== History ==
Former teammates with the Pekin Stars, Pete BardezBanian and Mark Olson formed the Blades in 1971 as an independent outfit at an outdoor rink. A little over a year later, the two were able to get agreements from several other local teams to form a new league called the Continental Hockey League. While still playing for the club, BardezBanian became the team's president while Olson worked as the head coach and general manager. Olson's three sons Joe, Mike and Ric, all played for the Blades and they quickly turned the team into a league powerhouse.

The Kenosha News reported Peoria as winning the league championship in 1974, though other contemporary accounts were contradictory. What is certain is that Peoria finished as runners-up in 1975 before winning three consecutive league championships. Before the title run, Ric Olson was on the United States national team during the run up to the 1976 Winter Olympics. He was the final defenseman cut from the team which would go on to finish 5th.

After the club's fifth trip to the finals in 1981, ice hockey had become so popular in Peoria that the Blades became victims of their own success. A brand new arena, the Peoria Civic Center opened in 1982, and the International Hockey League took note. The IHL placed an expansion team in Peoria that fall and the Blades, unable to compete with the pro team, ceased operations. As a nod to the team that had made it all possible, Ric Olson was a member of the Peoria Prancers for its inaugural season and played in four games.

For their efforts with the team, both Mark Olson and Pete BardezBanian were later inducted into the Peoria Sports Hall of Fame.

== Season-by-season record ==
Season	GP	W	L	T	PTS	GF	GA	Place	Playoffs
1972–73	11	9	2	0	–	–	–	1st	None
1973–74	19	12	7	0	–	–	–	1st	None
1974–75	25	14	10	1	35	158	136	2nd	Runner-Up
1975–76	37	21	14	2	48	–	–	2nd	Won Championship
1976–77	32	23	9	0	46	209	133	1st	Won Championship
1977–78	34	25	6	3	53	229	104	1st	Won Championship
1978–79	40	23	12	5	51	128	125	3rd	unknown
1979–80	35	13	17	5	31	196	185	4th	unknown
1980–81	32	20	10	2	42	158	137	1st	Runner-Up
1981–82	36	22	11	3	47	254	150	3rd	Semifinals
Total	331	200	109	22	–	–	–	–	3 Championships
