= St. Louis Saints =

- City: St. Louis, Missouri
- League: Continental Hockey League
- Operated: 1974–1975

Franchise history
- 1972–1973: St. Louis Pepsi
- 1973–1974: St. Louis Chiefs
- 1973–1974: Spirit of St. Louis
- 1974–1975: St. Louis Saints

The St. Louis Saints were an American semi-professional ice hockey team located in St. Louis, Missouri. The franchise began in the Continental Hockey League in 1972 as St. Louis Pepsi. There was another team known as the St. Louis Rockets that played independently that year. A tenuous connection between the 'Rockets' and 'Chiefs' monikers exists but it is inconclusive. Two St. Louis teams competed in the CnHL in 1973–74, the Chiefs and the Spirit of St. Louis (also referred to as the Saints in many accounts). By 1974–75, the Chiefs franchise had ceased operating and gave the Saints the entire market to themselves. Despite this boon, St. Louis wasn't able to survive and they last played in 1975.

== Season-by-season record ==
Season	GP	W	L	T	Pts	GF	GA	Place	Playoffs
1972–73	8	2	6	0	4	–	–	3rd	None
1973–74 (Chiefs)	13	7	6	0	14	–	–	2nd	None
1973–74 (Spirit)	16	3	13	0	6	–	–	4th	None
1974–75	23	8	14	1	23	–	–	T–4th	missed
1975–76	11	2	9	0	6	–	–	withdrew	N/A

Note: St. Louis withdrew from the league midway through the 1975–76 season.
