= Fort Wayne Scouts (ice hockey) =

- City: Fort Wayne, Indiana
- League: Continental Hockey League
- Operated: 1978–1979

The Fort Wayne Scouts were an American semi-professional ice hockey team located in Fort Wayne, Indiana. The team was in operation during the 1978–79 season in the Continental Hockey League.

== Season-by-season record ==
Season	GP	W	L	T	Pts	GF	GA	Place	Playoffs
1978-79	40	3	37	0	6	38	90	6th	none
