= Danville Dashers =

- City: Danville, Illinois
- League: Continental Hockey League (1981–1986); All-American Hockey League (1986–1989)
- Founded: 1981
- Folded: 1989
- Home arena: David S. Palmer Arena
- Colors: Red, white, blue

Franchise history
- 1981–1986: Danville Dashers
- 1986–1989: Danville Fighting Saints

The Danville Dashers were a semi-professional ice hockey team that played in Danville, Illinois, United States, at the David S. Palmer Arena.

Originally, the Dashers played in the Continental Hockey League (CnHL) from 1981 to 1986. In their first season, they were coached by Gordie Gibson and were regular season and Wal-Mar playoff champions in 1981–82. William "Chick" Chalmers was then hired as the next head coach and eventually led the team to another playoff championship in 1984. Ken Wilson then moved to Danville and became general manager and head coach from 1984 to 1986.

The CnHL folded in 1986 and Danville was one of three CnHL teams that founded a new league, the All-American Hockey League. Simultaneously, Danville rebranded to the Danville Fighting Saints. Former NHL player Lindsay Middlebrook briefly played goalie in 1986. Their coach for the 1987–88 season was Robert Nagy.

== Season-by-season record ==
Season	GP	W	L	T	Pts	GF	GA	Place	Playoffs
1981–82	36	29	7	0	58	246	147	1st, CnHL	Won Championship
1982–83	43	23	16	4	50	236	188	2nd, CnHL	Lost in first round
1983–84	40	25	13	2	53	275	197	3rd, CnHL	Won Championship
1984–85	40	19	21	0	39	227	229	3rd, CnHL	Lost in first round
1985–86	Statistics missing								
1986–87	31	21	10	0	42	—	—	2nd, AAHL	Lost in first round
1987–88	35	15	20	0	30	240	317	5th, AAHL	
1988–89	Statistics missing								
