= Pekin Stars =

- City: Pekin, Illinois
- League: Continental Hockey League
- Founded: 1964
- Folded: 1979
- Home arena: Pekin Memorial Rink
- Colors: Red and Black

Championships
- Regular season titles: 1978–79
- Playoff championships: 1979

The Pekin Stars were an American semi-professional ice hockey team located in Pekin, Illinois. The team played in the Continental Hockey League and was active for two seasons in the 1970s.

== History ==
Pekin was founded in 1964 and joined the Continental Hockey League in 1977. Their debut was a rough one, as the team lost all 34 games they played that season, though some were by forfeit as the club suspended play in early February. A change in ownership brought about a remarkable turnaround for the following season and Pekin won the league championship. Unfortunately, their success was short-lived and when further financing could not be arranged the team ceased operations after their title.

== Season-by-season record ==
Season	GP	W	L	T	Pts	GF	GA	Place	Playoffs
1977–78	34	0	34	0	0	79	260	6th	missed
1978–79	40	31	6	3	65	190	100	1st	Won Championship
