= Chicago Wildcats =

- City: Schaumburg, Illinois
- League: Continental Hockey League
- Founded: 1973
- Folded: 1975

The Chicago Wildcats were a semi-professional ice hockey team from Schaumburg, Illinois. The team was active for two seasons in the Continental Hockey League (CnHL) in the mid-1970s before folding.

== Season-by-season record ==
Season	GP	W	L	T	Pts	GF	GA	Place	Playoffs
1973–74	8	6	2	0	12	—	—	3rd	None
1974–75	25	8	16	1	21	84	143	4th	Lost Semifinal series 1–3

Note: Peoria Journal Star reported the Wildcats' league record and position as of 3/10. Conflicting newspaper accounts for the season do not allow for certainty of the Wildcats' finish in 1974 as the Wheeling Herald claimed they were in first place as of 3/21, and the Kenosha News reported Peoria had won the championship on 3/22.
