= 1973–74 IHL season =

North American ice hockey season

The 1973–74 IHL season was the 29th season of the International Hockey League, a North American minor professional league. Nine teams participated in the regular season, and the Des Moines Capitols won the Turner Cup.

== Regular season ==
North Division	GP	W	L	T	GF	GA	Pts
Muskegon Mohawks	76	44	26	6	272	234	94
Saginaw Gears	76	38	34	4	310	282	80
Toledo Hornets	76	33	42	1	260	302	67
Flint Generals	76	30	43	3	251	288	63
Port Huron Wings	76	29	44	3	229	268	61

South Division	GP	W	L	T	GF	GA	Pts
Des Moines Capitols	76	45	25	6	316	247	96
Columbus Owls	76	40	34	2	288	270	82
Dayton Gems	76	38	35	3	272	247	79
Fort Wayne Komets	76	31	45	0	245	305	62

== Turner Cup Playoffs ==
Turner Cup Quarterfinals
N3	Toledo Hornets	1
N4	Flint Generals	2
N1	Muskegon Mohawks	0
S2	Columbus Owls	3
N2	Saginaw Gears	3
S3	Dayton Gems	1

Turner Cup Semifinals
S1	Des Moines Capitols	4
N4	Flint Generals	0
S2	Columbus Owls	0
N2	Saginaw Gears	3

Turner Cup Final
S1	Des Moines Capitols	4
N1	Saginaw Gears	2

== Awards ==
- Gary F. Longman Memorial Trophy - IHL Rookie of the Year: Frank DeMarco (Des Moines Capitols)
