= Troy Sabres =

- City: Troy, Ohio
- League: Continental Hockey League (1982–1986); All-American Hockey League (1986–1987)
- Founded: 1982
- Home arena: Hobart Arena
- Colors: Blue and red

Franchise history
- 1982–1987: Troy Sabres
- 1987–1989: Miami Valley Sabres

The Troy Sabres were an American semi-professional ice hockey team in Troy, Ohio. They played in the Continental Hockey League from 1982 to 1986, and the All-American Hockey League in the 1986–1987 season. The team was coached by Moose Lallo and Maurice Benoit. In 1987, the Sabres merged with the Dayton Jets to form the Miami Valley Sabres.

== Season-by-season record ==
Season	GP	W	L	T	Pts	Finish	Playoffs
1982–83	37	23	8	6	52	1st, CnHL	Won Championship
1983–84	48	35	10	3	73		
1984–85	40	26	12	2	55	1st, CnHL	
1985–86	Statistics missing						
1986–87	31	15	15	1	31	3rd, AAHL	
