= Billings Marlboros =

- City: Billings, Montana
- League: Continental Hockey League
- Founded: 1985
- Folded: 1985
- Home arena: METRA
- Colors: Blue and White

The Billings Marlboros were a Continental Hockey League (CnHL) ice hockey team from Billings, Montana, active during the 1985–86 season. The team played at the MetraPark Arena. Billings was twinned with the Minot Maple Leafs, who shared a corporate office, but neither team was financially successful. On December 7, 1985, both teams ceased operations when neither had funds to continue playing. While there were some faint hopes that one of the teams could be sacrificed to save the other, there wasn't enough money left over for even that extreme measure. Neither team played again and the league itself folded after the season.

== Season-by-season record ==
Season	GP	W	L	T	Pts	GF	GA	Place	Playoffs
1985–86	18	14	4	0	28	160	100	withdrew	N/A

Note: Billings withdrew from the league in early December. The standings here represent their record through December 2 but its unclear if any further games were played.

== Notable players ==
- Former National Hockey League player Greg Carroll skated with the Marlboros during the 1985–86 season, scoring 17 goals and 29 assists for 46 points in nine games played. He also served as the team's coach.
