= Grand National Rodeo =

Annual rodeo event in Daly City, California

Grand National Rodeo, Horse, and Stock Show

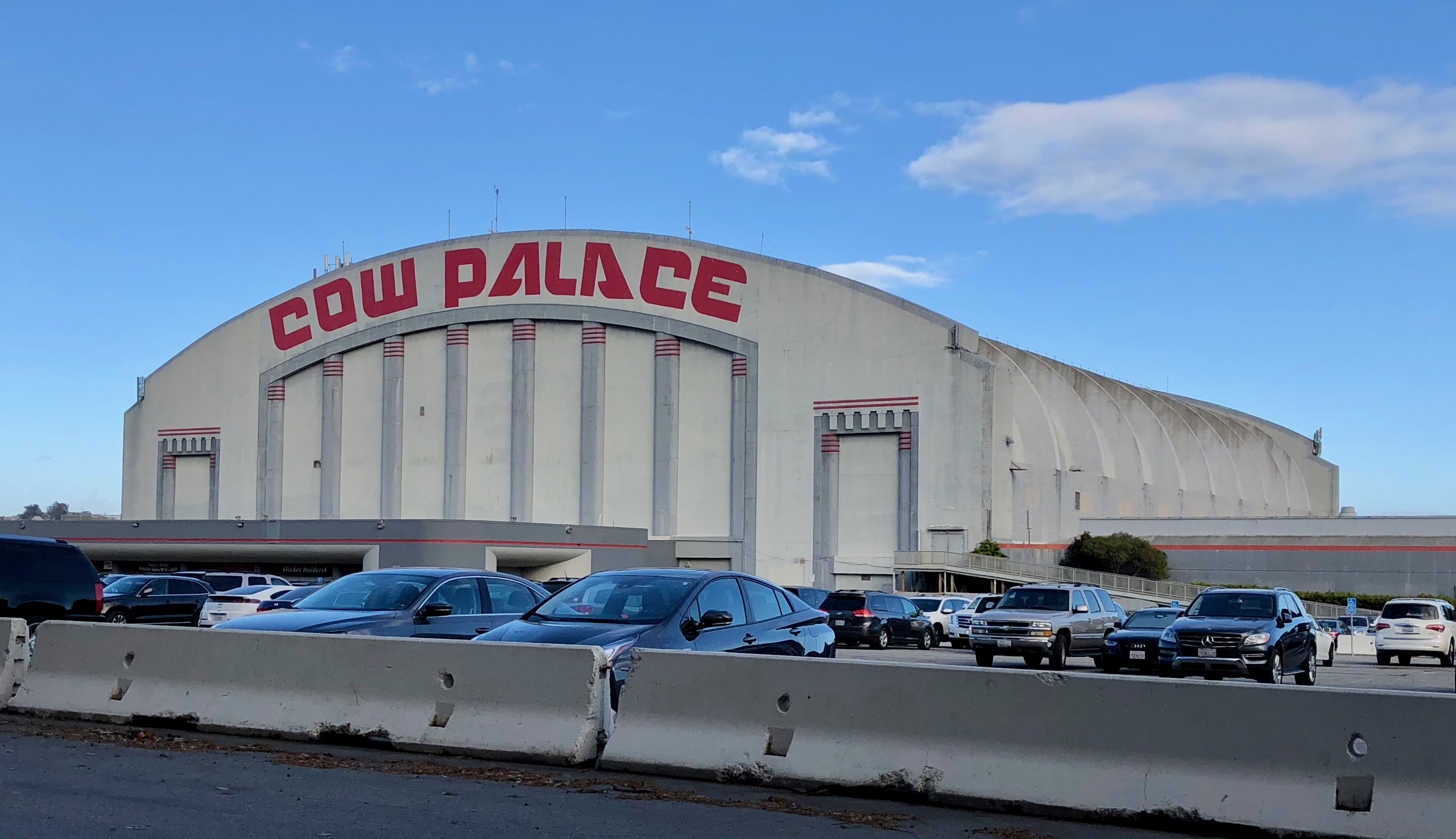
- Cow Palace (2018)
- Genre: rodeo and county fair
- Venue: Cow Palace
- Locations: Daly City, California
- Inaugurated: November 15, 1941
- Website: grandnationalrodeo.com

The Grand National Rodeo, Horse, and Stock Show is one of the largest rodeo events in the United States. Held annually in the Cow Palace in Daly City, the annual Grand National brings rodeo to an urban audience. The Grand National is also a county agricultural fair, run by the California Department of Food and Agriculture.

== Events ==
The usual 4-H club / Future Farmers of America events of an agricultural fair are held. Sheep, cattle, goats, rabbits, and pigs are judged. The horse and stock barns are open to the public and there are full English and Western horse shows.

California Department of Food and Agriculture, Division of Fairs and Expositions

In addition to the above events, there are country and western musical performances, a carnival and the Miss Grand National beauty pageant, whose contestants also typically compete in other competitions at the rodeo, which is sanctioned by the Professional Rodeo Cowboys Association (PRCA). The ProRodeo Hall of Fame inducted the Grand National Rodeo in 2008.

== History ==
The Cow Palace was built to host the first Grand National Rodeo, then known as three separate events: the Grand National Livestock Exposition, the Grand National Horse Show, and the Grand National Rodeo, held simultaneously from November 15–22, 1941. Further events at the Cow Palace were interrupted temporarily by World War II, and the site was used to stage troops; the ten-day rodeo and associated events returned on November 15, 1946. The third Grand National Rodeo was held from November 1–9, 1947.

The rodeo went virtual in 2020.

== See also ==
- Rodeo
