= Fox Valley Flyers =

- City: Dundee, Illinois
- League: Continental Hockey League
- Operated: 1979–1980

The Fox Valley Flyers were an American semi-professional ice hockey team located in Dundee, Illinois. The team was in operation during the 1979–80 season in the Continental Hockey League.

== Season-by-season record ==
Season	GP	W	L	T	Pts	GF	GA	Place	Playoffs
1979–80	35	2	33	0	5	106	360	5th	none
