= Phoenix Roadrunners (PHL) =

Defunct minor pro ice hockey team

The Phoenix Roadrunners are a defunct minor professional ice hockey team that was based in Phoenix, Arizona. Established in 1977, the team played the 1977–78 and 1978–79 seasons in the Pacific Hockey League. Coached by Sandy Hucul, the team played its home games out of the Arizona Veterans Memorial Coliseum.
