= Springfield Kings (Illinois) =

Former ice hockey team in Illinois

- City: Springfield, Illinois
- League: Continental Hockey League
- Founded: 1976
- Home arena: Ice Chateau
- Colors: Purple and Gold

Franchise history
- 1976—1985: Springfield Kings

The Springfield Kings were an American ice hockey team in Springfield, Illinois. They played in the Continental Hockey League (CnHL) from 1976 to 1985. The team played at the Ice Chateau.

The team was the runner-up in the league for the 1982–83 season losing to the Troy Sabres (4-2) in the finals. The head coach for the 1983–84 season was Pete Crawford. Ron Dorgan coached the team during the 1984–85 season.

== Season-by-season record ==
Season	GP	W	L	T	OTL	SOL	Pts	GF	GA	Place	Playoffs
1976–77	32	9	21	2	—	—	18	180	267		
1977–78	34	20	11	3	—	—	43	190	143		
1978–79	40	24	12	4	—	—	52	167	117		
1979–80	36	21	8	7	—	—	49	230	139		
1980–81	32	14	14	4	—	—	32	134	144		
1981–82	35	19	14	2	—	—	40	235	160		
1982–83	40	17	19	4	—	—	38	186	183	2nd	
1983–84	0	0	0	0	—	—	0	0	0		
1984–85	40	21	18	1	—	—	44	223	211		
