= Dayton Jets (ice hockey) =

- City: Dayton, Ohio
- League: Continental Hockey League (1985–1986); All-American Hockey League (1986–87)
- Operated: 1985–1987
- Home arena: Hara Arena
- Colors: green, white

Franchise history
- 1985–1987: Dayton Jets
- 1987–1989: Miami Valley Sabres

The Dayton Jets were an American minor professional ice hockey team in Dayton, Ohio.

== History ==
The Jets played in the Continental Hockey League for the 1985–86 season and the All-American Hockey League for the 1986–87 season. The club merged with the Troy Sabres to form the Miami Valley Sabres after the 1987 season.

== Season-by-season record ==
Season	GP	W	L	T	OTL	SOL	Pts	GF	GA	Place	Playoffs
1986-87	32	13	18	1	—	—	27	n/a	n/a	4., AAHL	
