= Rockton Wheels =

- City: Rockton, Illinois
- League: Continental Hockey League
- Founded: 1977
- Folded: 1978
- Home arena: Wagon Wheel Ice Palace
- General manager: Al Robertson

The Rockton Wheels were an American semi-professional ice hockey team based in Rockton, Illinois. They played one season, 1977–78, in the Continental Hockey League, with home games at the Wagon Wheel Ice Palace.

== History ==
Al Robertson organized and initially financed the Wheels in 1977 as the sixth team in the Continental Hockey League. Robertson had been coach and general manager of the Springfield Kings and initially held both roles with Rockton. He selected the Wagon Wheel Ice Palace partly because the earlier Wagon Wheel Cardinals had drawn strong local support there. The Wheels opened their home schedule against the Kenosha Flyers on October 1, 1977.

Robertson was succeeded as coach by player-coach Phil Caruso, who was suspended for the remainder of the season after a December fight. On February 1, 1978, Claude Wickenheiser became the third coach and acquired an ownership interest, while Robertson remained general manager and concentrated on promotion. The team faced recurring attendance and weather problems, and an Ice Palace compressor failure forced at least one February home game to be played at the Riverview Ice House in Rockford.

Rockton finished fifth in the six-team league with a 10-21-3 record. Because the top four teams qualified for the postseason, the Wheels missed the playoffs. Although Robertson said in February that the club would return despite an expected first-year loss, it did not play in 1978–79. A December 1978 retrospective said that Robertson had taken the operation out of Rockton during the summer but did not give a reason.

== Season-by-season record ==
Season	GP	W	L	T	Pts	GF	GA	Place	Playoffs
1977–78	34	10	21	3	23	164	204	5th	Missed
