= Northern Michigan Predators =

Sports team

The Northern Michigan Predators were a semi-professional ice hockey team that played for one season in the International Independent Hockey League. The IIHL survived less than one month.

== History ==
The first-ever league game was contested on December 7, 2003 when the Predators hosted the Lansing Ice Nuts. Lansing won the game 3-2. The final game in league history was played on January 4, 2004 when the Predators defeated Lansing 5-2.

Of the original six IIHL teams, Northern Michigan played eight league games going 4-4 against Lansing and the Soo City Mavericks.

== Team personnel ==
- G.M. Joseph Kolodziej
- Head Coach Craig Coxe
- Asst. Coach Rhett Dudley
- Captain Mike Wolf
- Asst. Captain Jacek Wilk
- Asst. Captain Frank Alfaro
