= Michigan Stars (Midwest Hockey League) =

- Founded: 2008
- League: Midwest Hockey League
- Team history: Michigan Stars
- Based in: Kalkaska, Michigan
- Arena: TBD
- Colors: Green & Gold

The Michigan Stars were a professional hockey team based in Kalkaska, Michigan. The team was a part of the Midwest Hockey League and folded before the season started.
