= Chicago Cardinals (1972–1986) =

- City: Chicago, Illinois
- League: Continental Hockey League
- Founded: 1971
- Folded: 1986

Franchise history
- 1971–1976: Chicago Cardinals
- 1978–1986: Chicago Cardinals

The Chicago Cardinals were a semi-professional ice hockey team from Chicago, Illinois. The Cardinals were founded as an independent team in 1971 and joined the Continental Hockey League (CnHL) in 1974. They suspended play in 1976, but returned to the league in 1978, remaining in it until it folded in 1986.

== Season-by-season record ==
Season	GP	W	L	T	Pts	GF	GA	Place	Playoffs
1974–75	16	4	10	2	16	71	90	6th	missed
1975–76	32	17	12	3	46	?	?	3rd	Semifinals
Play suspended from 1976 to 1978
1978–79	40	24	14	2	50	162	128	4th	?
1979–80	36	20	11	5	45	257	200	3rd	?
1980–81	32	18	9	5	41	170	152	2nd	Won Championship
1981–82	38	28	8	2	58	290	162	T–1st	Runner-Up
1982–83	35	11	20	4	26	176	209	4th	Semifinals
1983–84	?	?	?	?	?	?	?	4th	?
1984–85	40	12	27	1	25	179	326	4th	?
1985–86	?	?	?	?	?	?	?	4th	?

Note: results for the some seasons are missing or incomplete.
