= John Gravel =

Canadian ice hockey player

- Born: October 27, 1941 (age 84) Montreal, Quebec, Canada
- Height: 5 ft 10 in (178 cm)
- Weight: 180 lb (82 kg; 12 st 12 lb)
- Position: Defence
- Shot: Right
- Played for: Philadelphia Blazers
- Playing career: 1962–1978

Jean Michael "John" Gravel (born October 27, 1941) is a former ice hockey defenceman who played 16 seasons of professional hockey from 1962 to 1978. Gravel played eight games in the World Hockey Association during 1972–73 WHA season with the Philadelphia Blazers.

== Awards ==
The IHL awarded Gravel the Leading Rookie Award for the 1962-63 season, and he received the Governor's Trophy as the IHL's most outstanding defenceman during the 1969-70 season.

== Career statistics ==
=== Regular season and playoffs ===
			Regular season					Playoffs
Season	Team	League	GP	G	A	Pts	PIM	GP	G	A	Pts	PIM
1961–62	Montreal Junior Canadiens	OHA	50	3	18	21	0	—	—	—	—	—
1962–63	Hull-Ottawa Canadiens	EPHL	4	0	1	1	2	—	—	—	—	—
1962–63	Omaha Knights	IHL	59	5	24	29	30	7	1	4	5	6
1963–64	Toledo Blades	IHL	70	11	50	61	71	13	6	8	14	16
1964–65	Minneapolis Bruins	CPHL	68	13	25	38	29	5	0	2	2	0
1964–65	Portland Buckaroos	WHL	4	0	1	1	4	—	—	—	—	—
1965–66	San Francisco Seals	WHL	72	12	27	39	42	7	2	4	6	0
1966–67	California Seals	WHL	62	8	16	24	14	6	0	0	0	0
1967–68	Omaha Knights	CPHL	65	12	22	34	47	—	—	—	—	—
1968–69	Toledo Blades	IHL	64	16	51	67	49	8	1	9	10	2
1969–70	Toledo Blades	IHL	68	16	45	61	56	3	0	0	0	4
1970–71	Toledo Hornets	IHL	68	6	34	40	42	—	—	—	—	—
1971–72	Toledo Hornets	IHL	72	8	42	50	36	—	—	—	—	—
1972–73	Toledo Hornets	IHL	55	10	37	47	18	4	0	2	2	0
1972–73	Philadelphia Blazers	WHA	8	1	3	4	0	—	—	—	—	—
1973–74	Toledo Hornets	IHL	59	10	40	50	32	3	0	3	3	2
1974–75	Lansing-Saginaw	IHL	69	11	38	49	24	—	—	—	—	—
1975–76	Saginaw Gears	IHL	72	7	41	48	26	12	1	2	3	8
1976–77	Saginaw Gears	IHL	66	7	35	42	18	19	4	12	16	4
1977–78	Saginaw Gears	IHL	60	3	32	35	14	—	—	—	—	—
WHA totals			8	1	3	4	0	—	—	—	—	—
