= Frank DeMarco =

Canadian ice hockey player

- Born: December 14, 1950 (age 75) Sudbury, Ontario, Canada
- Height: 6 ft 2 in (188 cm)
- Weight: 190 lb (86 kg; 13 st 8 lb)
- Position: Right wing
- Shot: Left
- Played for: IHL; Des Moines Capitols; Flint Generals; CHL; Omaha Knights; Tulsa Oilers; SHL; Baltimore Clippers
- Playing career: 1973–1977

Frank DeMarco (born December 14, 1950) is a Canadian former professional ice hockey player.

DeMarco played 179 regular season games and 21 playoff games in International Hockey League (IHL) with the Des Moines Capitols and the Flint Generals. He was awarded the 1973–74 Gary F. Longman Memorial Trophy as the IHL Rookie of the Year.

== Career statistics ==
			Regular season					Playoffs
Season	Team	League	GP	G	A	Pts	PIM	GP	G	A	Pts	PIM
1969–70	Michigan State University	NCAA	24	6	3	9	8	—	—	—	—	—
1970–71	Michigan State University	NCAA	24	4	4	8	4	—	—	—	—	—
1971–72	Michigan State University	NCAA	36	10	2	12	8	—	—	—	—	—
1972–73	Michigan State University	NCAA	36	9	7	16	2	—	—	—	—	—
1973–74	Des Moines Capitols	IHL	75	49	39	88	40	10	3	7	10	8
1974–75	Omaha Knights	CHL	15	2	3	5	4	—	—	—	—	—
1974–75	Des Moines Capitols	IHL	41	13	28	41	32	7	3	4	7	4
1975–76	Tulsa Oilers	CHL	12	0	1	1	2	—	—	—	—	—
1975–76	Flint Generals	IHL	63	27	34	61	42	4	1	2	3	0
1976–77	Tulsa Oilers	CHL	24	7	8	15	0	5	0	0	0	0
1976–77	Baltimore Clippers	SHL-Sr.	45	21	23	44	32	—	—	—	—	—
IHL totals			179	89	101	190	114	21	7	13	20	12
CHL totals			51	9	12	21	6	5	0	0	0	0

== Awards and honours ==
Award	Year
Gary F. Longman Memorial Trophy - IHL Rookie of the Year	1973–74
