= Jackson All-Americans =

American minor pro ice hockey team in Jackson, Michigan

- City: Jackson, Michigan
- League: All-American Hockey League
- Founded: 1986

Franchise history
- 1986-1989: Jackson All-Americans

The Jackson All-Americans were an American minor pro ice hockey team in Jackson, Michigan. They played in the All-American Hockey League from 1986-1989. The club never finished higher than fourth place in their three seasons.

== Season-by-season record ==
Season	GP	W	L	T	OTL	SOL	Pts	GF	GA	Place	Playoffs
1986-87	32	8	22	2	—	—	18	n/a	n/a	5., AAHL	
1987-88	40	14	21	5	—	—	33	227	318	4., AAHL	
1988-89	30	6	21	3	—	—	15	n/a	n/a	4., AAHL	
