= Des Moines Capitols =

- City: Des Moines, Iowa
- League: International Hockey League
- Division: South
- Operated: 1972–1975
- Home arena: Des Moines Ice Arena
- Colors: Red, Gold, White
- Owner: Crawford C. Hubbell
- General manager: Ken Wilson
- Head coach: Dan Belisle

Franchise history
- 1958–1961: Des Moines Ice Hawks
- 1961–1972: Des Moines Oak Leafs
- 1972–1975: Des Moines Capitols

Championships
- Turner Cups: 1 (1973–74)

The Des Moines Capitols, were a minor league professional ice hockey team in Des Moines, Iowa, playing at the Des Moines Ice Arena. They were members of the International Hockey League from 1972 to 1975, and previously known as the Des Moines Oak Leafs. In 1973, Danny Gloor won the Gary F. Longman Memorial Trophy as rookie of the year.

In 1973–74, the Capitols won the Fred A. Huber Trophy as regular season champions, with a record of 45 wins, 25 losses, and 6 ties, totalling 96 points, despite having the most travelling of any team in the IHL. In the 1974 playoffs, the Capitols defeated the Saginaw Gears in six games to win the Turner Cup. The same season, Peter Mara was awarded the Leo P. Lamoureux Memorial Trophy, as the league's leading scorer and the James Gatschene Memorial Trophy, as outstanding playing ability and sportsmanlike conduct; and Frank Demarco won the rookie of the year.

The team was owned by Crawford C. Hubbell, a member of the prominent Hubbell business family of Des Moines.
