= International Independent Hockey League =

The International Independent Hockey League (IIHL) was an independent semi-professional ice hockey league that played for less than one month in the Great Lakes Region of the United States in December 2003 and January 2004.

== History ==
Six teams made up the IIHL, but only three teams Lansing, Northern Michigan and Soo City played more than six games.

The first IIHL game was played on December 7, 2003 in Harbor Springs, Michigan, between the Northern Michigan Predators and the Lansing Ice Nuts.

The league quickly gained a reputation for fluctuating schedules, folding teams and instability, and after just 16 games were played, folded in January 2004.

Former National Hockey League and minor league player Darren Banks served as head coach of the Motor City Snipers.

== Teams ==
- Lansing Ice Nuts (11-1)
- Motor City Snipers (0-2)
- Northern Michigan Predators (4-4)
- Ohio Valley Ice Cats (0-4)
- Soo City Mavericks (1-5)
- Tri-State Hurricanes - never played a league game

Three of the six teams were league-operated.

== See also ==
- List of ice hockey leagues
