= Lincoln Park Patriots =

Defunct American minor pro ice hockey team in Lincoln Park, Michigan

- City: Lincoln Park, Michigan
- League: All-American Hockey League
- Founded: 1988

Franchise history
- 1988-1989: Lincoln Park Patriots

The Lincoln Park Patriots were an American minor pro ice hockey team in Lincoln Park, Michigan. They played in the All-American Hockey League in the 1988-89 season. They folded after their first season.

== Season-by-season record ==
Season	GP	W	L	T	OTL	SOL	Pts	GF	GA	Place	Playoffs
1988-89	28	7	19	2	—	—	16	n/a	n/a	3., AAHL	
