= All-American Hockey League =

- Sport: Ice hockey
- First season: 1986
- Folded: June 1989
- Commissioner: Brendan Watson
- No. of teams: 12
- Country: United States
- Most titles: Danville Fighting Saints; Miami Valley Sabres; Virginia Lancers (1 each)

The All-American Hockey League (AAHL) was a minor professional hockey league formed in 1986 after the Continental Hockey League (CnHL) ceased operations. The league was created by the CnHL teams Danville, Dayton, and Troy adding the Downriver Stars and the Jackson All-Americans. In 1987, the AAHL absorbed the two remaining teams from Atlantic Coast Hockey League. After a single season in the AAHL, Carolina, Johnstown, and Virginia left the league to form the East Coast Hockey League. The AAHL only lasted one more season and folded after the 1988–89 season.

== Teams ==
=== AAHL teams ===
- Carolina Thunderbirds (1987–88) – left league to become a founding team in the ECHL.
- Danville Fighting Saints (1986–89) – ceased operations after the 1988–89 AAHL season
- Dayton Jets (1986–87) – merged with Troy Sabres to form Miami Valley Sabres
- Downriver Stars (1986–87) – became Michigan Stars the following season; folded due to bankruptcy during 1987–88 AAHL season after 14 games.
- Jackson All-Americans (1986–89) – ceased operations after the 1988–89 season
- Johnstown Chiefs (1987–88) – left league to become a founding team in the ECHL
- Lincoln Park Patriots (1988–89) – ceased operations after the 1988–89 AAHL season
- Miami Valley Sabres (1987–89) – ceased operations after the 1988–89 AAHL season
- Port Huron Clippers (1987–88) – folded after the 1987–88 regular season
- Troy Sabres (1986–87) – merged with Dayton Jets to form Miami Valley Sabres
- Virginia Lancers (1987–88) – left league to become a founding team in the ECHL
- Springfield Capitols (1988–89) – ceased operations after the 1988–89 AAHL season

== Season standings ==
=== 1986–87 season ===
Team	Games	Won	Lost	Tied	Points
Danville Fighting Saints (Note: – Won championship)	31	21	10	0	42
Downriver Stars	32	21	11	0	42
Troy Sabres	31	15	15	1	31
Dayton Jets	32	13	18	1	27
Jackson All-Americans	32	8	22	2	18

=== 1987–88 season ===
Team	Games	Won	Lost	Tied	Points	GF	GA
Virginia Lancersa	43	37	5	1	75	321	129
Carolina Thunderbirds	49	34	15	0	68	355	182
Miami Valley Sabres	37	17	19	1	35	217	260
Jackson All-Americans	40	14	21	5	33	227	318
Danville Fighting Saints	35	15	20	0	30	240	317
Johnstown Chiefs (Note: Joined midseason on January 13, 1988, against Carolina)	26	13	13	0	26	157	115
Port Huron Clippers	38	9	28	1	19	212	347
Michigan Stars (Note: folded November 30, 1987)	14	2	12	0	4	68	130

=== 1988–89 season ===
Team	GP	W	L	T	Pts
Miami Valley Sabres	36	23	13	0	46
Springfield Capitols	35	21	13	1	43
Lincoln Park Patriots	28	7	19	2	16
Jackson All-Americans	30	6	21	3	15
Danville Fighting Saints	Statistics missing				

== Leaders ==
=== Goals ===
Player	Team	Seasons	Points
Troy Nelson	Danville Fighting Saints	1986–1989	126*
Bernie Chiverelli	Troy/Miami Valley Sabres	1986–1989	88
Earl Fitzgerald	Danville; Springfield Capitols	1986–1989	86*
Brian Hernalsteen	Jackson All-Americans	1986–1988	70
Matt Muniz	Virginia Lancers	1987–88	62*

=== Points ===
Player	Team	Seasons	Points
Troy Nelson	Danville Fighting Saints	1986–1989	239*
Bernie Chiverelli	Troy/Miami Valley Sabres	1986–1989	168
Earl Fitzgerald	Danville; Springfield Capitols	1986–1989	167*
Brian Hernalsteen	Jackson All-Americans	1986–1988	141
John Torchetti	Carolina Thunderbirds	1987–88	134

* - stats incomplete

== See also ==
- List of ice hockey leagues
