= San Francisco Shamrocks =

The San Francisco Shamrocks were a minor professional ice hockey team that played in the Pacific Hockey League (PHL) during the 1977–78 and 1978–79 seasons. Based in Daly City, California, the team played its home games in the Cow Palace.

Coached by Wayne Rivers, the 1977–78 team compiled a 24–17–1 record, and won the Pacific Hockey League championship. The 1978–79 team completed less than half of its scheduled games before the Shamrocks folded on January 3, 1979.
