= Tucson Rustlers =

Defunct pro ice hockey team

The Tucson Rustlers are a defunct professional ice hockey team which played in the Pacific Hockey League during the 1978–79 season. Based in Tucson, Arizona, the team played its home games out of the Tucson Community Center.

Coached by Monte Miron, in its only season of play, the Rustlers placed fourth out of six teams with a record of 20 wins, 38 losses, and 0 ties.
