= Grand Rapids Grizzlies =

- City: Grand Rapids, Michigan
- League: Continental Hockey League
- Operated: 1980–1982
- Colors: Yellow and Black

The Grand Rapids Grizzlies were an American semi-professional ice hockey team located in Grand Rapids, Michigan. The team was in operation for parts of two seasons in the Continental Hockey League. The franchise folded mid-way through their second season.

== Season-by-season record ==
Season	GP	W	L	T	Pts	GF	GA	Place	Playoffs
1980-81	32	18	13	1	37	161	161	3rd	Lost in 1st round
1981-82	12	3	8	1	7	69	57	withdrew	N/A
