= Port Huron Clippers =

Defunct American minor pro ice hockey team in Michigan

- City: Port Huron, Michigan
- League: All-American Hockey League
- Founded: 1987

Franchise history
- 1987-1988: Port Huron Clippers

The Port Huron Clippers were an American minor pro ice hockey team in Port Huron, Michigan. They played in the All-American Hockey League in the 1987-88 season. They folded after their first season.

== Season-by-season record ==
Season	GP	W	L	T	OTL	SOL	Pts	GF	GA	Place	Playoffs
1987-88	38	9	28	1	—	—	19	212	347	7., AAHL	
