= Gary F. Longman Memorial Trophy =

Ice Hockey Trophy

The Gary F. Longman Memorial Trophy, was awarded annually by the International Hockey League to the most outstanding first year player as voted on by the league's coaches. Prior to 1968, the award was known as the Leading Rookie Award.

== Winners ==
Leading Rookie Award
Season	Player	Team
1961-62	Dave Richardson	Fort Wayne Komets
1962-63	John Gravel	Omaha Knights
1963-64	Don Westbrooke	Toledo Blades
1964-65	Bob Thomas	Toledo Blades
1965-66	Frank Golembrosky	Port Huron Flags
1966-67	Kerry Bond	Columbus Checkers
Gary F. Longman Memorial Trophy
Season	Player	Team
1967-68	Gary Ford	Muskegon Mohawks
1968-69	Doug Volmar	Columbus Checkers
1969-70	Wayne Zuk	Toledo Blades
1970-71	George "Corky" Agar	Flint Generals
1970-71	Herb Howdle	Dayton Gems
1971-72	Glenn "Chico" Resch	Muskegon Mohawks
1972-73	Danny Gloor	Des Moines Capitols
1973-74	Frank DeMarco	Des Moines Capitols)
1974-75	Rick Bragnalo	Dayton Gems
1975-76	Sid Veysey	Fort Wayne Komets)
1976-77	Garth MacGuigan	Muskegon Mohawks
1976-77	Ron Zanussi	Fort Wayne Komets
1977-78	Dan Bonar	Fort Wayne Komets
1978-79	Wes Jarvis	Port Huron Flags
1979-80	Doug Robb	Milwaukee Admirals
1980-81	Scott Vanderburgh	Kalamazoo Wings
1981-82	Scott Howson	Toledo Goaldiggers)
1982-83	Tony Fiore	Flint Generals
1983-84	Darren Jensen	Fort Wayne Komets
1984-85	Gilles Thibaudeau	Flint Generals
1985-86	Guy Benoit	Muskegon Lumberjacks
1986-87	Michel Mongeau	Saginaw Generals
1987-88	Ed Belfour	Saginaw Hawks
1987-88	John Cullen	Flint Spirits
1988-89	Paul Ranheim	Salt Lake Golden Eagles
1989-90	Rob Murphy	Milwaukee Admirals
1990-91	Nelson Emerson	Peoria Rivermen
1991-92	Dmitri Kvartalnov	San Diego Gulls
1992-93	Mikhail Shtalenkov	Milwaukee Admirals
1993-94	Radek Bonk	Las Vagas Thunder
1994-95	Tommy Salo	Denver Grizzlies
1995-96	Konstantin Shafranov	Fort Wayne Komets
1996-97	Sergei Samsonov	Detroit Vipers
1997-98	Todd White	Indianapolis Ice
1998-99	Marty Turco	Michigan K-Wings
1999-00	Nils Ekman	Long Beach Ice Dogs
2000-01	Brian Pothier	Orlando Solar Bears
