= Downriver Stars =

Defunct AAHL team based in Trenton, Michigan

- City: Trenton, Michigan
- League: All-American Hockey League
- Founded: 1986
- Home arena: Kennedy Ice Arena
- Colors: green, white

Franchise history
- 1986–1987: Downriver Stars
- 1987: Michigan Stars

The Downriver Stars were a minor professional ice hockey team based in Trenton, Michigan, that played in the All-American Hockey League.

The Stars were rebranded the Michigan Stars for the 1987–88 AAHL season, but after 14 games and a 2–12 record, the team folded midseason on November 30, 1987. As a result, Joe Selenski, John Daley, and Henry Brabham established the Johnstown Chiefs that started play in January 1988 to replace the Stars.

== Regular season ==
Season	Games	Won	Lost	Tied	Points	Standings
1986–87	32	21	11	0	42	2nd
1987–88	14	2	12	0	4	Folded
