= Continental Hockey League (1972–1986) =

The Continental Hockey League (CnHL) is a defunct semi-professional ice hockey league which operated from 1972 to 1986. It is known as the predecessor to the All-American Hockey League, in which three teams (Danville Dashers, Dayton Jets, and Troy Sabres) were charter members.

The league ceased operations after the 1985–86 season.

The championship trophy for the CnHL was called the 'Walmer Cup'.

== CnHL Teams ==
- Billings Marlboros (1985–86)
- Chicago Cardinals (1974–76, 1978–86)
- Chicago Wildcats (1973–75)
- Danville Dashers (1981–86)
- Dayton Jets (1985–86)
- Decatur Blues (1981–83)
- Decatur Storm (1983–84)
- Findlay Warriors (1983–84), became Dayton Jets
- Fort Wayne Scouts (1978–79)
- Fox Valley Flyers (1979–80)
- Grand Rapids Grizzlies (1980–82)
- Hammond Cardinals (1977–78)
- Janesville Jets (1981–82)
- Kenosha Chargers (1979–81)
- Kenosha Flyers (1974–75, 1976–79)
- Lake County Flyers (1975–76)
- Madison Blues (1974–77)
- Minot Maple Leafs (1985–86)
- Pekin Stars (1977–79)
- Peoria Blades (1972–82)
- Rockton Wheels (1977–78)
- Rock River Jets (1982–83)
- St. Louis Chiefs (1973–74)
- St. Louis Pepsi (1972–73)
- St. Louis Saints (1974–76)
- Spirit of St. Louis (1973–74)
- Springfield Kings (1976–85)
- Troy Sabres (1982–86)
- Webster Stars (1972–73)
