= Pacific Hockey League =

For the 1990s semi-professional ice hockey league, see Pacific Hockey League (1994).

The Pacific Hockey League was a low-level minor professional hockey league that existed for two seasons in 1977–78, and 1978–79. Its member teams from California, Arizona and Washington states, replaced the void left by defunct World Hockey Association franchises, with some teams sharing the names of their predecessors.

The idea for the league emerged in the 1977 WHA All-Star Game, as WHA co-founder Dennis Murphy and Indianapolis Racers founder Walt Marlow discussed putting a minor league in the West Coast akin to the recently defunct Western Hockey League. As the WHA's San Diego Mariners disbanded following that season, San Diego Sports Arena operator Peter Graham decided to join Murphy and Morrow to push for said league along with WHA alum James Browitt. Marlow became commissioner, while the other three partners became owners or partners of teams – another Mariners for Browitt, the Long Beach Sharks for Browitt and Murphy with the San Francisco Shamrocks, owned by the Harlem Globetrotters' Jerry Saperstein. A fourth franchise came with the Phoenix Roadrunners, that just been expelled from the WHA. The inaugural season had each team playing 42 times, and afterwards a final where the Shamrocks beat the Roadrunners 2–1. The success lead to the arrival of three other franchises, the Los Angeles Blades, Spokane Flyers and Tucson Rustlers the following year. However, the second season was plagued with financial problems, with the Los Angeles and San Francisco franchises even folding halfway through, leading to the cancellation of the playoffs (the Roadrunners were named champions for their regular season performance) and the outright folding of the league.

== Teams ==
| Team name | Years | City |
|---|---|---|
| Long Beach Sharks/Rockets | 1977–78 | Long Beach, California |
| Los Angeles Blades | 1978–79 | Los Angeles, California |
| Phoenix Roadrunners | 1977–79 | Phoenix, Arizona |
| San Diego Mariners/Hawks | 1977–79 | San Diego, California |
| San Francisco Shamrocks | 1977–79 | San Francisco, California |
| Spokane Flyers | 1978–79 | Spokane, Washington |
| Tucson Rustlers | 1978–79 | Tucson, Arizona |

== Champions ==
- 1978: San Francisco Shamrocks
- 1979: Phoenix Roadrunners
