= 1972–73 Alberta Oilers season =

WHA hockey team season (inaugural season)

1972–73 Alberta Oilers
- Division: 5th Western
- 1972–73 record: 38–37–3
- Home record: 26–13–2
- Road record: 12–24–1
- Goals for: 269
- Goals against: 256

Team information
- General manager: Bill Hunter
- Coach: Ray Kinasewich; Bill Hunter
- Captain: Al Hamilton
- Alternate captains: Doug Barrie; Val Fonteyne; Jim Harrison
- Arena: Edmonton Gardens
- Average attendance: 3,848 (74.0%)

Team leaders
- Goals: Jim Harrison (39)
- Assists: Al Hamilton (50)
- Points: Jim Harrison (86)
- Penalty minutes: Al Hamilton (124)
- Wins: Jack Norris (28)
- Goals against average: Jack Norris (3.06)

The 1972–73 Alberta Oilers season was the Oilers' first season, as one of twelve inaugural franchises of the newly formed World Hockey Association (WHA).

== Regular season ==
The Oilers victory over the Ottawa Nationals on October 11, 1972, was the first game in league history, with Ron Anderson scoring the first goal.

Jim Harrison led the team in scoring, with 39 goals and 86 points. On January 30, 1973, in an 11–3 defeat of the New York Raiders, Harrison set a major professional hockey record with 10 points (3G, 7A) in a single game. That feat was later matched by Darryl Sittler on February 7, 1976, in a National Hockey League game.

The Oilers posted a winning record in the regular season, with 38 wins, 37 losses and 3 ties. The Minnesota Fighting Saints finished with an identical record, so a single game playoff was contested to decide fourth place in the Western Division. The Fighting Saints defeated the Oilers 4–2 on a neutral site rink (in Calgary), ending the Oilers season.

=== Season standings ===
Western Division
	GP	W	L	T	GF	GA	PIM	Pts
Winnipeg Jets	78	43	31	4	285	249	757	90
Houston Aeros	78	39	35	4	284	269	1363	82
Los Angeles Sharks	78	37	35	6	259	250	1477	80
Minnesota Fighting Saints	78	38	37	3	250	269	843	79
Alberta Oilers	78	38	37	3	269	256	1134	79
Chicago Cougars	78	26	50	2	245	295	811	54

== Schedule and results ==
1972–73 regular season
October

Game	Result	Date	Score	Opponent	Record
1	W	October 11, 1972	7–4	@ Ottawa Nationals	1–0–0
2	L	October 13, 1972	0–6	@ Quebec Nordiques	1–1–0
3	L	October 14, 1972	2–3	@ Cleveland Crusaders	1–2–0
4	W	October 15, 1972	5–2	@ Winnipeg Jets	2–2–0
5	W	October 17, 1972	3–2	Winnipeg Jets	3–2–0
6	W	October 20, 1972	4–1	Philadelphia Blazers	4–2–0
7	T	October 24, 1972	3–3	Chicago Cougars	4–2–1
8	L	October 27, 1972	0–6	@ Cleveland Crusaders	4–3–1
9	W	October 28, 1972	4–1	@ New England Whalers	5–3–1
10	L	October 29, 1972	2–7	@ New York Raiders	5–4–1
11	L	October 31, 1972	3–4	Houston Aeros	5–5–1

November

Game	Result	Date	Score	Opponent	Record
12	W	November 3, 1972	4–3	Houston Aeros	6–5–1
13	L	November 5, 1972	3–5	Ottawa Nationals	6–6–1
14	W	November 7, 1972	4–2	New York Raiders	7–6–1
15	W	November 9, 1972	7–2	Los Angeles Sharks	8–6–1
16	W	November 11, 1972	5–3	Los Angeles Sharks	9–6–1
17	L	November 12, 1972	1–3	Cleveland Crusaders	9–7–1
18	W	November 15, 1972	3–1	Winnipeg Jets	10–7–1
19	W	November 17, 1972	3–1	Chicago Cougars	11–7–1
20	L	November 21, 1972	3–4	@ Minnesota Fighting Saints	11–8–1
21	L	November 22, 1972	4–5	@ Philadelphia Blazers	11–9–1
22	L	November 24, 1972	2–7	@ New England Whalers	11–10–1
23	L	November 25, 1972	2–4	@ New York Raiders	11–11–1
24	W	November 26, 1972	2–1	@ Ottawa Nationals	12–11–1
25	L	November 28, 1972	0–3	@ Winnipeg Jets	12–12–1
26	T	November 30, 1972	3–3	Winnipeg Jets	12–12–2

December

Game	Result	Date	Score	Opponent	Record
27	L	December 1, 1972	4–6	Minnesota Fighting Saints	12–13–2
28	L	December 3, 1972	2–6	Quebec Nordiques	12–14–2
29	L	December 8, 1972	2–4	@ Los Angeles Sharks	12–15–2
30	L	December 10, 1972	3–5	@ Los Angeles Sharks	12–16–2
31	L	December 12, 1972	4–6	@ Houston Aeros	12–17–2
32	W	December 13, 1972	3–2	@ Houston Aeros	13–17–2
33	L	December 15, 1972	3–4	Ottawa Nationals	13–18–2
34	W	December 17, 1972	3–1	Ottawa Nationals	14–18–2
35	W	December 21, 1972	5–4	New England Whalers	15–18–2
36	L	December 23, 1972	2–3	@ Chicago Cougars	15–19–2
37	L	December 25, 1972	2–3	@ Chicago Cougars	15–20–2

January

Game	Result	Date	Score	Opponent	Record
38	W	January 1, 1973	7–3	Winnipeg Jets	16–20–2
39	L	January 10, 1973	1–6	@ Winnipeg Jets	16–21–2
40	W	January 12, 1973	2–1	@ Los Angeles Sharks	17–21–2
41	W	January 13, 1973	4–1	@ Los Angeles Sharks	18–21–2
42	L	January 15, 1973	3–4	Los Angeles Sharks	18–22–2
43	W	January 16, 1973	6–5	Los Angeles Sharks	19–22–2
44	L	January 20, 1973	4–6	Chicago Cougars	19–23–2
45	W	January 22, 1973	6–1	Chicago Cougars	20–23–2
46	L	January 27, 1973	0–1	Philadelphia Blazers	20–24–2
47	W	January 28, 1973	4–2	Philadelphia Blazers	21–24–2
48	W	January 30, 1973	11–3	New York Raiders	22–24–2

February

Game	Result	Date	Score	Opponent	Record
49	W	February 1, 1973	8–5	New York Raiders	23–24–2
50	W	February 2, 1973	4–3	@ Winnipeg Jets	24–24–2
51	L	February 4, 1973	3–5	Winnipeg Jets	24–25–2
52	L	February 6, 1973	2–4	New England Whalers	24–26–2
53	W	February 7, 1973	3–1	New England Whalers	25–26–2
54	W	February 9, 1973	6–0	Minnesota Fighting Saints	26–26–2
55	W	February 11, 1973	7–5	Minnesota Fighting Saints	27–26–2
56	W	February 13, 1973	5–3	Houston Aeros	28–26–2
57	L	February 15, 1973	3–5	Houston Aeros	28–27–2
58	L	February 20, 1973	4–5	@ Cleveland Crusaders	28–28–2
59	L	February 21, 1973	4–5	@ New York Raiders	28–29–2
60	L	February 23, 1973	2–4	@ New England Whalers	28–30–2
61	L	February 25, 1973	2–3	@ Ottawa Nationals	28–31–2
62	L	February 27, 1973	4–5	@ Houston Aeros	28–32–2
63	L	February 28, 1973	2–3	@ Houston Aeros	28–33–2

March

Game	Result	Date	Score	Opponent	Record
64	L	March 6, 1973	3–4	@ Minnesota Fighting Saints	28–34–2
65	W	March 8, 1973	3–2	@ Chicago Cougars	29–34–2
66	W	March 10, 1973	5–4	@ Chicago Cougars	30–34–2
67	L	March 11, 1973	1–2	@ Minnesota Fighting Saints	30–35–2
68	W	March 13, 1973	4–2	Cleveland Crusaders	31–35–2
69	W	March 14, 1973	4–2	Cleveland Crusaders	32–35–2
70	W	March 16, 1973	4–2	Quebec Nordiques	33–35–2
71	W	March 17, 1973	3–0	Quebec Nordiques	34–35–2
72	W	March 20, 1973	5–3	Minnesota Fighting Saints	35–35–2
73	T	March 22, 1973	1–1	@ Winnipeg Jets	35–35–3
74	L	March 24, 1973	4–5	@ Quebec Nordiques	35–36–3
75	W	March 25, 1973	5–4	@ Quebec Nordiques	36–36–3
76	W	March 28, 1973	2–1	@ Philadelphia Blazers	37–36–3
77	L	March 29, 1973	1–2	@ Philadelphia Blazers	37–37–3
78	W	March 30, 1973	5–3	@ Minnesota Fighting Saints	38–37–3

Legend: Win (2 points) Loss (0 points) Tie (1 point)

== Playoffs ==
The Oilers and the Minnesota Fighting Saints were tied at the end of the season. They had the same number of victories and points, and they had both won four games against each other. Subsequently, it was decided that the two teams would play a one-game playoff to decide the final spot in the playoffs, to be played in Calgary. The Oilers lost the game, and the Fighting Saints went on to play in the Quarterfinals.

1973 Avco Cup playoffs
Western Division 4th Place Tiebreaker Game vs. Minnesota Fighting Saints

Game	Date	Visitor	Score	Home	OT	Decision	Attendance	Series	Recap
1	April 4	Minnesota Fighting Saints	4 – 2	Alberta Oilers		Norris	6,392	0–1	

Legend: Win Loss

== Player statistics ==
=== Skaters ===
Note: GP = Games played; G = Goals; A = Assists; Pts = Points; PIM = Penalties In Minutes

Player	Regular season					Playoffs				
Player	GP	G	A	Pts	PIM	GP	G	A	Pts	PIM
Jim Harrison	66	39	47	86	93	1	0	1	1	2
Al Hamilton	78	11	50	61	124	1	0	0	0	2
Ross Perkins	71	21	37	58	19	1	0	0	0	2
Ed Patenaude	78	29	27	56	59	1	0	1	1	4
Ron Walters	78	28	26	54	37	1	1	0	1	0
Bob Wall	78	16	29	45	20	1	0	1	1	0
Val Fonteyne	77	7	32	39	2	1	0	0	0	0
Eddie Joyal	71	22	16	38	16	1	0	0	0	0
Bill Hicke	73	14	24	38	20	1	0	0	0	0
Brian Carlin	65	12	22	34	6	1	0	0	0	0
Doug Barrie	54	9	22	31	111	1	0	0	0	22
Ron Anderson	73	14	15	29	43	1	0	0	0	0
Ken Baird	75	14	15	29	112	1	1	0	1	6
Bob Falkenberg	77	6	23	29	44	1	0	0	0	0
Steve Carlyle	67	7	10	17	35	1	0	0	0	0
Dennis Kassian	50	6	7	13	14	1	0	1	1	0
Bob McAneeley	51	5	7	12	24	—	—	—	—	—
Bernie Blanchette^{†}	23	5	4	9	2	—	—	—	—	—
Roger Cote	60	3	5	8	46	1	0	0	0	0
John Fisher	40	0	5	5	0	—	—	—	—	—
Jack Norris	64	0	3	3	2	1	0	0	0	0
Jim Benzelock^{‡}	26	1	1	2	10	—	—	—	—	—
Derek Harker^{‡}	1	0	0	0	0	—	—	—	—	—
Ken Brown	20	0	0	0	2	—	—	—	—	—

^{†}Denotes player traded to the Oilers mid-season.
^{‡}Denotes player traded away mid-season.
Statistics for all players reflect only games played with the Oilers.

=== Goaltenders ===
Note: GP = Games played; TOI = Time on ice (minutes); W = Wins; L = Losses; T = Ties; GA = Goals against; SO = Shutouts; SV% = Save percentage; GAA = Goals against average

Player	Regular season									Playoffs							
Player	GP	TOI	W	L	T	GA	SO	SV%	GAA	GP	TOI	W	L	GA	SO	SV%	GAA
Jack Norris	64	3705	28	29	3	189	1	0.903	3.06	1	59	0	1	4	0	0.833	4.07
Ken Brown	20	1034	10	8	0	63	1	0.883	3.65	—	—	—	—	—	—	—	—

== Awards and records ==
Four Oilers were selected to play in the mid-season All-Star Game on January 6:

- Jack Norris (G)
- Al Hamilton (D)
- Bob Wall (D)
- Jim Harrison (C)

=== Milestones ===
Regular Season
Player	Milestone	Reached
Ron Anderson	1st WHA Game; 1st WHA Goal; 1st WHA Point	October 11, 1972
Bill Hicke	1st WHA Game; 1st WHA Goal; 1st WHA Point	October 11, 1972
Eddie Joyal	1st WHA Game; 1st WHA Goal; 1st WHA Point	October 11, 1972
Ron Walters	1st WHA Game; 1st WHA Goal; 1st WHA Point	October 11, 1972
Jim Benzelock	1st WHA Game	October 11, 1972
Roger Cote	1st WHA Game	October 11, 1972
Bob Falkenberg	1st WHA Game	October 11, 1972
Dennis Kassian	1st WHA Game	October 11, 1972
Ed Patenaude	1st WHA Game	October 11, 1972
Ken Brown	1st WHA Game; 1st WHA Win	October 11, 1972
Steve Carlyle	1st WHA Game; 1st WHA Assist; 1st WHA Point	October 11, 1972
John Fisher	1st WHA Game; 1st WHA Assist; 1st WHA Point	October 11, 1972
Val Fonteyne	1st WHA Game; 1st WHA Assist; 1st WHA Point	October 11, 1972
Al Hamilton	1st WHA Game; 1st WHA Assist; 1st WHA Point	October 11, 1972
Bob McAneeley	1st WHA Game; 1st WHA Assist; 1st WHA Point	October 11, 1972
Bob Wall	1st WHA Game; 1st WHA Assist; 1st WHA Point	October 11, 1972
Jim Harrison	1st WHA Game; 1st WHA Goal; 1st WHA Assist; 1st WHA Point	October 11, 1972
Jack Norris	1st WHA Game	October 13, 1972
Roger Cote	1st WHA Goal; 1st WHA Point	October 15, 1972
Val Fonteyne	1st WHA Goal	October 15, 1972
Eddie Joyal	1st WHA Assist	October 15, 1972
Ron Walters	1st WHA Assist	October 15, 1972
Ron Anderson	1st WHA Assist	October 17, 1972
Jack Norris	1st WHA Win	October 17, 1972
Brian Carlin	1st WHA Game	October 20, 1972
Bob Falkenberg	1st WHA Assist; 1st WHA Point	October 20, 1972
Ed Patenaude	1st WHA Goal; 1st WHA Assist; 1st WHA Point	October 20, 1972
Ron Walters	1st WHA Hat-trick	October 20, 1972
Brian Carlin	1st WHA Goal; 1st WHA Point	October 24, 1972
Bill Hicke	1st WHA Assist	October 24, 1972
Ross Perkins	1st WHA Game	October 27, 1972
Dennis Kassian	1st WHA Goal; 1st WHA Point	October 28, 1972
Ross Perkins	1st WHA Assist; 1st WHA Point	October 28, 1972
Ken Baird	1st WHA Assist; 1st WHA Point	October 29, 1972
Doug Barrie	1st WHA Game	October 29, 1972
Ross Perkins	1st WHA Goal	October 29, 1972
Doug Barrie	1st WHA Goal; 1st WHA Point	November 3, 1972
Brian Carlin	1st WHA Assist	November 3, 1972
Bob Wall	1st WHA Goal	November 3, 1972
Dennis Kassian	1st WHA Assist	November 5, 1972
Doug Barrie	1st WHA Assist	November 5, 1972
Steve Carlyle	1st WHA Goal	November 7, 1972
Al Hamilton	1st WHA Goal	November 7, 1972
Ken Baird	1st WHA Goal	November 9, 1972
Bob Falkenberg	1st WHA Goal	November 11, 1972
Jim Benzelock	1st WHA Assist; 1st WHA Point	November 25, 1972
Bob McAneeley	1st WHA Goal	November 30, 1972
Jim Benzelock	1st WHA Goal	December 12, 1972
Roger Cote	1st WHA Assist	December 21, 1972
Jim Harrison	1st WHA Gordie Howe hat trick	December 21, 1972
Ross Perkins	1st WHA Hat-Trick	January 1, 1973
Jack Norris	1st WHA Assist	January 16, 1973
Jim Harrison	1st WHA Hat-Trick	January 30, 1973
Jack Norris	1st WHA Shutout	February 9, 1973
Al Hamilton	100th WHA PIM	February 27, 1973
Ken Baird	100th WHA PIM	March 17, 1973
Ken Brown	1st WHA Shutout	March 17, 1973
Jim Harrison	2nd WHA Gordie Howe hat trick	March 17, 1973
Doug Barrie	100th WHA PIM	March 28, 1973
Ken Baird	1st WHA Game	TBD
Derek Harker	1st WHA Game	TBD

Playoffs
Player	Milestone	Reached
Ron Anderson	1st WHA Game	April 4, 1973
Doug Barrie	1st WHA Game	April 4, 1973
Brian Carlin	1st WHA Game	April 4, 1973
Steve Carlyle	1st WHA Game	April 4, 1973
Roger Cote	1st WHA Game	April 4, 1973
Bob Falkenberg	1st WHA Game	April 4, 1973
Val Fonteyne	1st WHA Game	April 4, 1973
Al Hamilton	1st WHA Game	April 4, 1973
Bill Hicke	1st WHA Game	April 4, 1973
Eddie Joyal	1st WHA Game	April 4, 1973
Jack Norris	1st WHA Game	April 4, 1973
Ross Perkins	1st WHA Game	April 4, 1973
Ken Baird	1st WHA Game; 1st WHA Goal; 1st WHA Point	April 4, 1973
Ron Walters	1st WHA Game; 1st WHA Goal; 1st WHA Point	April 4, 1973
Jim Harrison	1st WHA Game; 1st WHA Assist; 1st WHA Point	April 4, 1973
Dennis Kassian	1st WHA Game; 1st WHA Assist; 1st WHA Point	April 4, 1973
Ed Patenaude	1st WHA Game; 1st WHA Assist; 1st WHA Point	April 4, 1973
Bob Wall	1st WHA Game; 1st WHA Assist; 1st WHA Point	April 4, 1973

== Transactions ==
=== Draft picks ===
The WHA General Player Draft was held on February 12–13, 1972 to stock each new WHA team with their initial rosters. The Oilers selected four NHL players with their "priority" selections:

- Norm Ullman, C, Toronto Maple Leafs
- Bobby Clarke, C, Philadelphia Flyers
- Bruce MacGregor, RW, New York Rangers
- Phil Myre, G, Montreal Canadiens

Ullman and MacGregor would eventually play for the Oilers, but not for the 1972–73 season. Both were Edmonton-born players who finished their playing careers with the Oilers after long NHL careers.

The Oilers selected an additional 96 players in subsequent rounds of the draft. Of those, 22 players would play for the Oilers, 16 in the 1972–73 season.

Player	Pos	Team	League	Joined Oilers
Rounds 1-10
Garnet Bailey	LW	Boston Bruins	NHL	1978–79
Doug Barrie	D	Los Angeles Kings	NHL	1972–73
Ross Perkins	C	Fort Worth Wings	CHL	1972–73
Rounds 11-20
Ron Anderson	RW	Buffalo Sabres	NHL	1972–73
Len Lunde	LW	Ilves Tampere	SM-sarja	1973–74
Rounds 21-50
Ken Baird	D	California Golden Seals	NHL	1972–73
Jim Benzelock	RW	Dayton Gems	IHL	1972–73
Brian Carlin	LW	Los Angeles Kings	NHL	1972–73
Bob Falkenberg	D	Detroit Red Wings	NHL	1972–73
Val Fonteyne	LW	Pittsburgh Penguins	NHL	1972–73
Del Hall	LW	California Golden Seals	NHL	1977–78
Al Hamilton	D	Buffalo Sabres	NHL	1972–73
Eddie Joyal	C	Philadelphia Flyers	NHL	1972–73
Kerry Ketter	D	Nova Scotia Voyageurs	AHL	1975–76
Barry Long	D	Portland Buckaroos	WHL	1974–75
Glen Sather	LW	New York Rangers	NHL	1976–77
Ron Walters	C	Tidewater Wings	AHL	1972–73
Rounds 51-70
Roger Cote	D	Cleveland Barons	AHL	1972–73
Bob McAneeley	LW	University of British Columbia	CWUAA	1972–73
Ed Patenaude	RW	Fort Wayne Komets	IHL	1972–73
Bob Wall	D	Detroit Red Wings	NHL	1972–73
Rounds 71+
John Fisher	C	Fort Worth Wings	CHL	1972–73

=== Trades ===
Date	To Alberta Oilers	Traded to	Traded for
May 1972	Jim Harrison	Calgary Broncos	Cash
May 1972	Dennis Kassian	Houston Aeros	Cash
June 1972	Future considerations	Quebec Nordiques	Francois Lacombe
July 1972	Darryl Sittler; Steve Carlyle	Cleveland Crusaders	Jocelyn Hardy; Doug Brindley; Bill Horton; Rich Pumple
August 1972	Jack Norris; Ken Brown	Cleveland Crusaders	Bob Whidden
August 1972	Future considerations	Quebec Nordiques	John Gravel; Jean-Yves Cartier
September 1972	Cash	Ottawa Nationals	Gilles Gratton
November 3, 1972	Cash	Philadelphia Blazers	Derek Harker
December 27, 1972	Bernie Blanchette	Chicago Cougars	Jim Benzelock

=== Free Agents ===
Date	Player	Former team
September 11, 1972	Bill Hicke	Pittsburgh Penguins (NHL)

=== Signings ===
Date	Player	Term
1972	Len Lunde	2-year
June 6, 1972	Doug Barrie	
June 6, 1972	Brian Carlin	
June 6, 1972	Roger Cote	
June 6, 1972	Al Hamilton	5-year
June 6, 1972	Eddie Joyal	3-year
June 6, 1972	Ross Perkins	3-year
June 6, 1972	Bob Wall	
June 7, 1972	Jim Benzelock	3-year
June 7, 1972	Bob Falkenberg	3-year
June 20, 1972	Jim Harrison	4-year
July 6, 1972	Ken Baird	3-year
July 6, 1972	Derek Harker	
July 6, 1972	Bob McAneeley	
July 6, 1972	Ed Patenaude	
July 27, 1972	Ron Walters	
August 4, 1972	Ken Brown	3-year
August 4, 1972	Jack Norris	
August 21, 1972	Ron Anderson	
August 21, 1972	Steve Carlyle	3-year
September 4, 1972	Val Fonteyne	2-year
September 18, 1972	Dennis Kassian	2-year
October 1972	John Fisher	
