= 1974–75 Edmonton Oilers season =

WHA hockey team season

1974–75 Edmonton Oilers
- Division: 5th Central
- 1974–75 record: 36–38–4
- Home record: 25–12–2
- Road record: 11–26–2
- Goals for: 279
- Goals against: 279

Team information
- General manager: Bill Hunter
- Coach: Brian Shaw (30–26–3); Bill Hunter (6–12–1)
- Captain: Al Hamilton
- Alternate captains: Doug Barrie; Barry Long; Bruce MacGregor
- Arena: Edmonton Gardens (Oct–Nov); Northlands Coliseum (Nov–Apr)
- Minor league affiliates: Winston-Salem Polar Twins (SHL); Flint Generals (IHL)

Team leaders
- Goals: Mike Rogers (35)
- Assists: Mike Rogers (48)
- Points: Mike Rogers (83)
- Penalty minutes: Ken Baird (151)
- Plus/minus: Ray McKay (+18)
- Wins: Jacques Plante (15)
- Goals against average: Jacques Plante (3.32)

The 1974–75 Edmonton Oilers season was the Oilers' third season of operation. The Oilers placed last and failed to make the playoffs for the first time since the 1972–73 season.

== Regular season ==
=== Final standings ===
Canadian Division	GP	W	L	T	Pts	GF	GA	PIM
Quebec Nordiques	78	46	32	0	92	331	299	1132
Toronto Toros	78	43	33	2	88	349	304	883
Winnipeg Jets	78	38	35	5	81	322	293	869
Vancouver Blazers	78	37	39	2	76	256	270	1075
Edmonton Oilers	78	36	38	4	76	279	279	896

== Schedule and results ==
1974–75 regular season
October: 0–2–0 (home: 0–0–0; road: 0–2–0)

Game	Date	Visitor	Score	Home	OT	Decision	Attendance	Record	Pts	Record
1	October 18	Edmonton Oilers	0 – 4	Winnipeg Jets		Brown	7,697	0–1–0	0	
2	October 30	Edmonton Oilers	6 – 8	Vancouver Blazers		Brown	6,690	0–2–0	0	

November: 8–4–0 (home: 5–1–0; road: 3–3–0)

Game	Date	Visitor	Score	Home	OT	Decision	Attendance	Record	Pts	Record
3	November 2	Edmonton Oilers	4 – 2	Cleveland Crusaders		Worthy	13,263	1–2–0	2	
4	November 3	Edmonton Oilers	3 – 1	Indianapolis Racers		Worthy	6,561	2–2–0	4	
5	November 10	Cleveland Crusaders	1 – 4	Edmonton Oilers		Plante	15,326	3–2–0	6	
6	November 13	Winnipeg Jets	3 – 5	Edmonton Oilers		Plante	10,873	4–2–0	8	
7	November 15	Toronto Toros	4 – 5	Edmonton Oilers		Plante	15,326	5–2–0	10	
8	November 17	Indianapolis Racers	1 – 2	Edmonton Oilers		Worthy	8,890	6–2–0	12	
9	November 18	Winnipeg Jets	3 – 5	Edmonton Oilers		Plante	11,583	7–2–0	14	
10	November 20	Edmonton Oilers	2 – 4	Quebec Nordiques		Worthy	9,518	7–3–0	14	
11	November 22	Edmonton Oilers	8 – 2	Toronto Toros			10,240	8–3–0	16	
12	November 24	Houston Aeros	4 – 3	Edmonton Oilers	OT	Plante	15,362	8–4–0	16	
13	November 26	Edmonton Oilers	1 – 5	San Diego Mariners		Worthy	4,743	8–5–0	16	
14	November 28	Edmonton Oilers	0 – 2	Houston Aeros		Brown	6,112	8–6–0	16	

December: 9–4–0 (home: 5–1–0; road: 4–3–0)

Game	Date	Visitor	Score	Home	OT	Decision	Attendance	Record	Pts	Record
15	December 1	New England Whalers	4 – 8	Edmonton Oilers			10,972	9–6–0	18	
16	December 4	Vancouver Blazers	3 – 6	Edmonton Oilers			7,505	10–6–0	20	
17	December 6	Edmonton Oilers	1 – 3	Phoenix Roadrunners		Worthy	5,864	10–7–0	20	
18	December 8	Michigan Stags	0 – 7	Edmonton Oilers		Plante	8,088	11–7–0	22	
19	December 11	Edmonton Oilers	3 – 4	Quebec Nordiques	OT	Brown	10,864	11–8–0	22	
20	December 13	Edmonton Oilers	5 – 4	Minnesota Fighting Saints		Worthy	6,140	12–8–0	24	
21	December 15	Edmonton Oilers	3 – 1	Indianapolis Racers		Brown	5,828	13–8–0	26	
22	December 17	Edmonton Oilers	2 – 7	Houston Aeros			5,163	13–9–0	26	
23	December 19	Edmonton Oilers	7 – 6	San Diego Mariners	OT	Brown	4,383	14–9–0	28	
24	December 21	Edmonton Oilers	3 – 0	Chicago Cougars		Worthy	2,133	15–9–0	30	
25	December 22	San Diego Mariners	3 – 6	Edmonton Oilers			5,257	16–9–0	32	
26	December 26	Minnesota Fighting Saints	5 – 1	Edmonton Oilers			15,300	16–10–0	32	
27	December 29	Indianapolis Racers	4 – 5	Edmonton Oilers	OT	Plante	10,058	17–10–0	34	

January: 6–7–2 (home: 5–4–2; road: 1–3–0)

Game	Date	Visitor	Score	Home	OT	Decision	Attendance	Record	Pts	Record
28	January 1	San Diego Mariners	2 – 3	Edmonton Oilers	OT	Plante	9,215	18–10–0	36	
29	January 3	Phoenix Roadrunners	3 – 3	Edmonton Oilers	OT	Worthy	9,797	18–10–1	37	
30	January 5	Chicago Cougars	3 – 2	Edmonton Oilers		Plante	9,421	18–11–1	37	
31	January 9	Minnesota Fighting Saints	2 – 3	Edmonton Oilers		Plante	7,050	19–11–1	39	
32	January 10	Indianapolis Racers	3 – 3	Edmonton Oilers	OT	Worthy	6,565	19–11–2	40	
33	January 12	Quebec Nordiques	3 – 1	Edmonton Oilers		Plante	13,375	19–12–2	40	
34	January 15	Edmonton Oilers	2 – 9	Houston Aeros			6,342	19–13–2	40	
35	January 16	Edmonton Oilers	2 – 3	San Diego Mariners		Brown	3,706	19–14–2	40	
36	January 17	Edmonton Oilers	7 – 1	Phoenix Roadrunners			7,184	20–14–2	42	
37	January 18	Edmonton Oilers	1 – 3	Phoenix Roadrunners		Worthy	7,613	20–15–2	42	
38	January 23	Winnipeg Jets	3 – 7	Edmonton Oilers		Plante	10,802	21–15–2	44	
39	January 24	Houston Aeros	5 – 7	Edmonton Oilers		Brown	15,300	22–15–2	46	
40	January 26	Toronto Toros	7 – 5	Edmonton Oilers		Plante	12,237	22–16–2	46	
41	January 28	Houston Aeros	5 – 7	Edmonton Oilers		Worthy	15,326	23–16–2	48	
42	January 31	Cleveland Crusaders	2 – 0	Edmonton Oilers		Plante	9,512	23–17–2	48	

February: 6–7–1 (home: 5–3–0; road: 1–4–1)

Game	Date	Visitor	Score	Home	OT	Decision	Attendance	Record	Pts	Record
43	February 2	Chicago Cougars	3 – 4	Edmonton Oilers	OT	Worthy	8,718	24–17–2	50	
44	February 4	Edmonton Oilers	1 – 0	Baltimore Blades	OT	Brown	2,810	25–17–2	52	
45	February 5	Edmonton Oilers	2 – 4	Minnesota Fighting Saints		Plante	5,893	25–18–2	52	
46	February 9	Phoenix Roadrunners	6 – 4	Edmonton Oilers		Plante	9,325	25–19–2	52	
47	February 11	Edmonton Oilers	3 – 4	Toronto Toros		Plante	8,954	25–20–2	52	
48	February 12	Edmonton Oilers	2 – 2	New England Whalers	OT	Worthy	9,916	25–20–3	53	
49	February 14	Toronto Toros	4 – 8	Edmonton Oilers			15,326	26–20–3	55	
50	February 16	Phoenix Roadrunners	5 – 4	Edmonton Oilers			10,351	26–21–3	55	
51	February 18	New England Whalers	3 – 6	Edmonton Oilers		Brown	8,571	27–21–3	57	
52	February 19	Edmonton Oilers	1 – 4	Winnipeg Jets		Worthy	8,736	27–22–3	57	
53	February 21	New England Whalers	4 – 2	Edmonton Oilers			10,302	27–23–3	57	
54	February 23	Minnesota Fighting Saints	4 – 6	Edmonton Oilers		Brown	9,413	28–23–3	59	
55	February 25	Edmonton Oilers	3 – 4	Chicago Cougars	OT	Worthy	2,262	28–24–3	59	
56	February 28	Baltimore Blades	2 – 6	Edmonton Oilers		Brown	8,079	29–24–3	61	

March: 5–12–1 (home: 3–2–0; road: 2–10–1)

Game	Date	Visitor	Score	Home	OT	Decision	Attendance	Record	Pts	Record
57	March 2	Baltimore Blades	2 – 7	Edmonton Oilers		Worthy	8,200	30–24–3	63	
58	March 4	Cleveland Crusaders	3 – 1	Edmonton Oilers		Brown	8,123	30–25–3	63	
59	March 5	Edmonton Oilers	0 – 6	Vancouver Blazers			10,363	30–26–3	63	
60	March 7	Vancouver Blazers	0 – 4	Edmonton Oilers		Brown	9,810	31–26–3	65	
61	March 10	Edmonton Oilers	3 – 5	Baltimore Blades		Brown	2,477	31–27–3	65	
62	March 11	Edmonton Oilers	5 – 1	Chicago Cougars		Worthy	2,249	32–27–3	67	
63	March 14	Edmonton Oilers	0 – 3	Cleveland Crusaders		Worthy	5,611	32–28–3	67	
64	March 15	Edmonton Oilers	2 – 6	New England Whalers			10,507	32–29–3	67	
65	March 16	Edmonton Oilers	1 – 10	Winnipeg Jets			9,998	32–30–3	67	
66	March 18	Quebec Nordiques	5 – 8	Edmonton Oilers		Worthy	14,634	33–30–3	69	
67	March 20	Edmonton Oilers	1 – 3	Indianapolis Racers		Plante	7,168	33–31–3	69	
68	March 22	Edmonton Oilers	1 – 5	Cleveland Crusaders		Worthy	12,919	33–32–3	69	
69	March 23	Edmonton Oilers	2 – 4	Minnesota Fighting Saints		Brown	14,503	33–33–3	69	
70	March 25	Edmonton Oilers	4 – 5	New England Whalers		Brown	8,366	33–34–3	69	
71	March 26	Edmonton Oilers	6 – 4	Quebec Nordiques		Worthy	10,726	34–34–3	71	
72	March 27	Edmonton Oilers	2 – 2	Baltimore Blades	OT	Plante	3,083	34–34–4	72	
73	March 28	Edmonton Oilers	4 – 5	Toronto Toros		Worthy	12,103	34–35–4	72	
74	March 31	San Diego Mariners	5 – 2	Edmonton Oilers			10,125	34–36–4	72	

April: 2–2–0 (home: 2–1–0; road: 0–1–0)

Game	Date	Visitor	Score	Home	OT	Decision	Attendance	Record	Pts	Record
75	April 1	Quebec Nordiques	5 – 3	Edmonton Oilers		Worthy	10,329	34–37–4	72	
76	April 4	Vancouver Blazers	3 – 5	Edmonton Oilers		Brown	8,526	35–37–4	74	
77	April 5	Edmonton Oilers	2 – 3	Vancouver Blazers		Worthy	8,191	35–38–4	74	
78	April 6	Chicago Cougars	3 – 6	Edmonton Oilers		Brown	9,646	36–38–4	76	

Legend: Win (2 points) Loss (0 points) Tie (1 point)

== Player statistics ==
Regular season
Scoring

Player	Pos	GP	G	A	Pts	PIM	+/-	PPG	SHG	GWG
Mike Rogers	C	78	35	48	83	2	2	4	0	0
Barry Long	D	78	20	40	60	116	-8	7	1	0
Ken Baird	D	77	30	28	58	151	-19	8	0	0
Bobby Sheehan	C	77	19	39	58	8	7	2	0	0
Bruce MacGregor	C	72	24	28	52	10	-11	3	3	0
Eddie Joyal	C	78	22	25	47	2	-10	0	2	0
Blair MacDonald	RW	72	22	24	46	14	4	1	0	0
Doug Barrie	D	78	12	33	45	122	-11	1	2	0
Ron Climie	LW	49	15	27	42	15	3	3	0	0
Rusty Patenaude	RW	56	20	16	36	38	1	3	0	0
Tom Gilmore	LW	74	12	19	31	84	-22	0	0	0
Ray McKay	D	69	8	20	28	47	18	1	0	0
Tim Sheehy	RW	29	8	20	28	4	-5	2	0	0
Steve Carlyle	D	73	2	25	27	46	-13	0	0	0
Ross Perkins	C	76	7	16	23	33	7	0	1	0
Murray Kennett	D	50	4	14	18	17	16	0	0	0
Ron Buchanan	C	22	6	9	15	4	0	1	0	0
Al Hamilton	D	25	1	13	14	42	5	1	0	0
Bill Morris	LW	36	4	8	12	6	5	0	0	0
Bill Laing	LW	42	2	4	6	32	-3	0	0	0
Jim McCrimmon	D	34	1	5	6	50	9	0	0	0
Doug Kerslake	RW	10	4	0	4	10	3	0	0	0
Don Herriman	LW	33	1	2	3	21	-6	0	0	0
Ken Brown	G	32	0	1	1	2	0	0	0	0
Jacques Plante	G	31	0	1	1	2	0	0	0	0
Chris Worthy	G	29	0	0	0	7	0	0	0	0

Goaltending

Player	MIN	GP	W	L	T	GA	GAA	SO
Jacques Plante	1592	31	15	14	1	88	3.32	1
Chris Worthy	1660	29	11	13	3	99	3.58	1
Ken Brown	1466	32	10	11	0	86	3.52	2
Team:	4718	78	36	38	4	273	3.47	4

Note: Pos = Position; GP = Games played; G = Goals; A = Assists; Pts = Points; +/- = plus/minus; PIM = Penalty minutes; PPG = Power-play goals; SHG = Short-handed goals; GWG = Game-winning goals
MIN = Minutes played; W = Wins; L = Losses; T = Ties; GA = Goals-against; GAA = Goals-against average; SO = Shutouts;

== Awards and records ==
Regular Season
Player	Milestone	Reached
Barry Long	1st WHA Game	October 18, 1974
Ray McKay	1st WHA Game	October 18, 1974
Mike Rogers	1st WHA Game	October 18, 1974
Bruce MacGregor	1st WHA Assist; 1st WHA Point	October 30, 1974
Ray McKay	1st WHA Assist; 1st WHA Point	October 30, 1974
Mike Rogers	1st WHA Assist; 1st WHA Point	October 30, 1974
Rusty Patenaude	100th WHA Point	October 30, 1974
Bruce MacGregor	1st WHA Goal	November 2, 1974
Barry Long	1st WHA Goal; 1st WHA Point	November 10, 1974
Jacques Plante	1st WHA Game; 1st WHA Win; 1st WHA Assist	November 10, 1974
Ken Baird	??? WHA Hat-trick	November 13, 1974
Ray McKay	1st WHA Goal	November 15, 1974
Doug Barrie	??? WHA Gordie Howe hat trick	November 18, 1974
Barry Long	1st WHA Assist	November 18, 1974
Mike Rogers	1st WHA Goal	November 18, 1974
Al Hamilton	100th WHA Assist	December 4, 1974
Jacques Plante	1st WHA Shutout	December 8, 1974
Ken Baird	300th WHA PIM	January 9, 1975
Bill Laing	1st WHA Assist; 1st WHA Point	January 17, 1975
Doug Barrie	400th WHA PIM	January 18, 1975
Blair MacDonald	??? WHA Hat-trick	January 23, 1975
Tom Gilmore	400th WHA PIM	January 24, 1975
Ken Baird	100th WHA Point	February 9, 1975
Bill Morris	1st WHA Assist; 1st WHA Point	February 14, 1975
Ken Brown	1st WHA Assist	February 16, 1975
Bill Morris	1st WHA Goal	February 16, 1975
Tom Gilmore	100th WHA Point	February 18, 1975
Doug Kerslake	1st WHA Goal; 1st WHA Point	February 28, 1975
Bill Laing	1st WHA Goal	March 7, 1975
Doug Barrie	100th WHA Point	March 18, 1975
Barry Long	100th WHA PIM	March 18, 1975
Bobby Sheehan	100th WHA Assist	March 28, 1975
Eddie Joyal	100th WHA Point	April 1, 1975
Timothy Sheehy	100th WHA Assist	April 4, 1975
Doug Barrie	200th WHA Game	April 5, 1975
Ken Baird	200th WHA Game	TBD
Tom Gilmore	200th WHA Game	TBD
Rusty Patenaude	200th WHA Game	TBD
Ross Perkins	200th WHA Game	TBD
Bobby Sheehan	200th WHA Game	TBD
Doug Kerslake	1st WHA Game	TBD
Bill Laing	1st WHA Game	TBD
Bruce MacGregor	1st WHA Game	TBD
Bill Morris	1st WHA Game	TBD
Blair MacDonald	100th WHA Game	TBD
Jim McCrimmon	100th WHA Game	TBD

== Transactions ==
=== Trades ===
Date	To Edmonton Oilers	Traded to	Traded for
February 25, 1974	Ab DeMarco	Chicago Cougars	1st round pick in 1974 Secret - Paul McIntosh
February 25, 1974	1st round pick in 1974 Secret - Clark Gillies	Winnipeg Jets	1st round pick in 1977 - Ron Duguay
May 7, 1974	Ray McKay	Cleveland Crusaders	Future considerations
May 31, 1974	Future considerations	Indianapolis Racers	Gary Bredin; 11th round pick in 1974 - Greg Steel; 12th round pick in 1974 - Russ Hall; 13th round pick in 1974 - Mike St. Cyr; 14th round pick in 1974 - Mitch Babin; 15th round pick in 1974 - Jim Chicoyne
June 1974	Cash	Phoenix Roadrunners	Del Hall
July 1974	Future considerations	Cincinnati Stingers	Steve Andrascik
August 23, 1974	Don Herriman	San Diego Mariners	Bob Wall
August 30, 1974	Mike Will	Indianapolis Racers	Paul Holmgren
October 9, 1974	Ray Reeson	Phoenix Roadrunners	Jack Norris
October 27, 1974	Ron Buchanan	Cleveland Crusaders	Jim Harrison
January 22, 1975	Murray Kennett	Indianapolis Racers	Ron Buchanan
February 14, 1975	Tim Sheehy	New England Whalers	Ron Climie
March 9, 1975	Cash	St. Louis Blues (NHL)	Jim McCrimmon

=== Players acquired ===
Date	Player	Former team	Term
October 1974	Bill Morris	Winston-Salem Polar Twins (SHL)	1-year
February 23, 1975	Doug Kerslake	Chicago Black Hawks (NHL)	

=== Players lost ===
Date	Player	New team	Term
1974	Val Fonteyne	Retired	
1974	Dennis Kassian	Retired	
April 30, 1974	Danny Gruen	Phoenix Roadrunners	
May 30, 1974	Bernie Blanchette	Phoenix Roadrunners	
May 30, 1974	Roger Cote	Indianapolis Racers	
May 30, 1974	Bob Fitchner	Indianapolis Racers	
May 30, 1974	Brian McKenzie	Indianapolis Racers	
July 28, 1974	Bob McAneeley	California Golden Seals (NHL)	3-year
September 1974	Ian Wilkie	Retired	
October 1974	Wendell Bennett	Phoenix Roadrunners	

=== Signings ===
Date	Player	Term
May 7, 1974	Barry Long	
May 7, 1974	Ray McKay	4-year
May 7, 1974	Jacques Plante	2-year
June 18, 1974	Bruce MacGregor	4-year
August 15, 1974	Mike Rogers	3-year

== Draft picks ==
Edmonton's draft picks at the 1974 WHA Amateur Draft.

Round	#	Player	Nationality	College/Junior/Club team (League)
WHA Secret Amateur Draft
1	7	Clark Gillies (F)	Canada	Regina Pats (WCHL)
2	19	Mike Rogers (C)	Canada	Calgary Centennials (WCHL)
WHA Amateur Draft
1	8	Gary Soetaert (D)	Canada	Edmonton Oil Kings (WCHL)
2	23	Glen Burdon (D)	Canada	Regina Pats (WCHL)
3	38	Paul Holmgren (F)	United States	St. Paul Vulcans (MidJHL)
4	53	Kevin Treacy (RW)	Canada	Cornwall Royals (QMJHL)
5	67	Dave Langevin (D)	United States	University of Minnesota-Duluth (WCHA)
6	82	Bernard Noreau (F)	Canada	Laval National (QMJHL)
7	97	Tom Sundberg (F)	United States	St. Paul Vulcans (MidJHL)
8	112	Cam Botting (RW)	Canada	Niagara Falls Flyers (SOJHL)
9	127	Marty Mathews (F)	Canada	Flin Flon Bombers (WCHL)
10	140	Willie Friesen (LW)	Canada	Swift Current Broncos (WCHL)

== See also ==
- 1974–75 WHA season
