= 1966 Memorial Cup =

Canadian junior ice hockey championship

The Memorial Cup trophy

The 1966 Memorial Cup was the 48th annual Memorial Cup competition, organized by the Canadian Amateur Hockey Association (CAHA) to determine the champion of "junior A" ice hockey. The George Richardson Memorial Trophy champions Oshawa Generals of the Ontario Hockey Association in Eastern Canada competed against the Abbott Cup champions Edmonton Oil Kings of the Central Alberta Hockey League in Western Canada. Maple Leaf Gardens in Toronto, Ontario hosted the Final, which featured Bobby Orr, the Generals captain. It was the last of 18 Memorial Cup series to be played at the Gardens. In a best-of-seven series, Edmonton won their second Memorial Cup, defeating Oshawa four games to two. Orr was injured and played sparingly.

Lloyd Pollock oversaw the tournament on behalf of the CAHA. A Canadian Press release published on May 13, 1966, credited him for keeping the peace and being unflappable. He was quoted as saying "a big stick can be just as effective as a soft-sell", after he rejected protests from both Wren Blair of Oshawa, and Bill Hunter of Edmonton, for both managers not knowing the regulations. After the conclusion of the series, Pollock announced a $40,000 profit in ticket sales due to playing all of the games at Maple Leaf Gardens, and that the CAHA received 25% of revenue from television broadcasts of the games which would benefit junior hockey.

== Scores ==
- Game 1: Edmonton 7-2 Oshawa
- Game 2: Oshawa 7-1 Edmonton
- Game 3: Oshawa 6-2 Edmonton
- Game 4: Edmonton 5-3 Oshawa
- Game 5: Edmonton 7-4 Oshawa
- Game 6: Edmonton 2-1 Oshawa

Source: MasterCardMemorialCup.ca

== Winning roster ==
Ron Anderson, Garnet Bailey, Doug Barrie, Brian Bennett, Ron Caley, Craig Cameron, Bob Falkenberg, Al Hamilton, Jim Harrison, Brian Hague, Galen Head, Ted Hodgsen, Kerry Ketter, Ross Lonsberry, Jim Knox, Don McLeod, Jim Mitchell, Harold Myers, Eugene Peacosh, Ross Perkins, Murray Pierce, Dave Rochefort, Ted Rogers, Jim Schraefel, Red Simpson, Ron Walters. Coach: Ray Kinasewich
