= Winston-Salem Polar Twins (SHL) =

American minor league professional ice hockey team (1973–1977)

- City: Winston-Salem, North Carolina
- League: Southern Hockey League
- Operated: 1973–1977
- Home arena: Winston-Salem Memorial Coliseum
- Colors: White, silver, black
- Affiliates: WHA (1973–74); NHL (1974–1977)

The Winston-Salem Polar Twins were a minor league professional ice hockey team, based in Winston-Salem, North Carolina. The team was a founding member of the Southern Hockey League in 1973, and played home games at the Winston-Salem Memorial Coliseum. The initial owners of the team were a group of 15 investors, led by Ed Timmerman and Eldridge Hanes. In the 1973–74 season, Winston-Salem finished in fourth place, and lost in the first round of the playoffs under player-coach Don Carter. In 1974, Forbes Kennedy was brought in to coach, and improved results two years in a row, yet lost in the first round of the playoffs both seasons. In December 1975, the Polar Twins were sold to Jim Crockett Jr. Player-coach Ron Anderson took over in the fourth season, and the team was in last place in January. On January 7, 1977, during the team's fourth season, Crockett announced he was folding the team.

== Major league affiliations ==
The Polar Twins were affiliated with the World Hockey Association in the 1973–74 season, and with the National Hockey League from 1974 to 1977.

Years	Affiliations
1973–74	Edmonton Oilers, New York Golden Blades, Jersey Knights
1974–75	New York Rangers, Detroit Red Wings
1975–76	New York Rangers, St. Louis Blues
1976–77	New York Rangers

== Notable players ==
Notable Polar Twins players that also played in the National Hockey League or World Hockey Association:

- Ron Anderson
- Randy Andreachuk
- Ron Ashton
- Bernie Blanchette
- Bob Boyd
- Ken Brown
- Brian Carlin
- Bob Champoux
- Howie Colborne
- Roger Cote
- Gary Cunningham
- Brian Derksen
- Gary Doyle
- Bob Fitchner
- Derek Harker
- Rich Hart
- Don Herriman
- Greg Holst
- Jim Jones
- Dennis Kassian
- Jamie Kennedy
- Bill Laing
- Rick Lalonde
- John Mazur
- Bob McAneeley
- Jim McCrimmon
- Bill Morris
- Jim Murray
- Terry Ryan
- Blaine Rydman
- Ron Serafini
- Danny Sullivan
- Jim Watt
- Don Wheldon
- Bill Young

== Results ==
Season-by-season results:

Season	GP	W	L	T	Pts	Pct	GF	GA	PIM	Standing	Playoffs
1973–74	72	26	44	2	54	0.375	283	363	1273	4th, SHL	Lost in round 1
1974–75	72	32	40	0	64	0.444	300	345	1831	3rd, SHL	Lost in round 1
1975–76	72	30	29	13	73	0.507	252	251	1127	3rd, SHL	Lost in round 1
1976–77	42	11	30	1	23	0.274	130	193	585	7th, SHL	folded
TOTALS	258	99	143	16	214	0.415	965	1152	4816		

== Franchise leaders ==
All-time and season leaders:

All-time regular season

- Games played: Bill Morris, 186
- Goals scored: Ken Gassoff, 83
- Assists: Ken Gassoff, 135
- Points: Ken Gassoff, 218
- Penalty minutes: Brian Molvik, 318

Single-season records

- Goals scored: Bernie Blanchette, 39 (1973–74)
- Assists: John Campbell, 59 (1975–76)
- Points: John Campbell, 92 (1975–76)
- Penalty minutes: Ron Fogal, 248 (1974–75)

Postseason records

- Goals scored: Bill Morris, 6 (1974)
- Assists: Bill Morris, 8 (1974)
- Points: Bill Morris, 14 (1974)
- Penalty minutes: Greg Holst, 42 (1975)
