= 1965 Memorial Cup =

Canadian junior ice hockey championship

The Memorial Cup trophy

The 1965 Memorial Cup final was the 47th junior ice hockey championship of the Canadian Amateur Hockey Association (CAHA). The George Richardson Memorial Trophy champions Niagara Falls Flyers of the Ontario Hockey Association in Eastern Canada competed against the Abbott Cup champions Edmonton Oil Kings of the Central Alberta Hockey League in Western Canada. In a best-of-seven series, held at Edmonton Gardens in Edmonton, Alberta. Niagara Falls won their 1st Memorial Cup, defeating Edmonton 4 games to 1.

CAHA president Art Potter oversaw the 1965 Memorial Cup, a rematch of the 1963 Memorial Cup final between the Edmonton Oil Kings and the Niagara Falls Flyers. The 1965 series was also physical in nature and included further disagreements between Potter and Hap Emms. During game three of the series, Niagara Falls' Derek Sanderson attacked Edmonton's Bob Falkenberg which resulted in a bench-clearing brawl. Potter ordered that the game be stopped after three match penalties, nine major penalties and three misconducts had been issued; and after Edmonton police had to restore order when fans became involved with players. Potter described the brawl as "butchery" and the most brutal he had seen. Both teams made threats not to continue and Potter recommended that the series be called off. After multiple suspensions and an increased police presence, the series continued and Niagara Falls won in five games. Emms made multiple complaints about the scheduling and inferred that Potter had a financial benefit from games at the Edmonton Gardens. Potter implied that Emms felt he knew everything, and declined the "cloak of genius" label given to him by Emms.

== Scores ==
- Game 1: Niagara Falls 3-2 Edmonton
- Game 2: Niagara Falls 5-1 Edmonton
- Game 3: Edmonton 5-1 Niagara Falls
- Game 4: Niagara Falls 8-2 Edmonton
- Game 5: Niagara Falls 8-1 Edmonton

== Winning roster ==
Guy Allen, John Arbour, Doug Favell, Steve Atkinson, Brian Bradley, Bud Debrody, Bill Goldsworthy, Andre Lajeunesse, Rick Ley, Jim Lorentz, Don Marcotte, Gilles Marotte, Rosaire Paiement, Bernie Parent, Jean Pronovost, Bobby Ring, Derek Sanderson, Mike Sherman, Ted Snell, Barry Wilkins, Dave Woodley. Coach: Bill Long.
