= Butch Paul =

Canadian ice hockey player

- Born: September 11, 1943; Rocky Mountain House, Alberta, Canada
- Died: March 25, 1966 (aged 22); Memphis, Tennessee, U.S.
- Height: 5 ft 11 in (180 cm)
- Weight: 160 lb (73 kg; 11 st 6 lb)
- Position: Centre
- Shot: Right
- Played for: Detroit Red Wings
- Playing career: 1961–1966

Arthur Stewart "Butch" Paul (September 11, 1943 – March 25, 1966) was a Canadian professional ice hockey centre who played three games for the Detroit Red Wings in the 1964–65 season.

Paul was killed in a car accident in Memphis, Tennessee while driving home from a game on March 25, 1966. At the time, he was playing for the Memphis Wings of the Central Hockey League.

== Career statistics ==
=== Regular season and playoffs ===
			Regular season					Playoffs
Season	Team	League	GP	G	A	Pts	PIM	GP	G	A	Pts	PIM
1961–62	Edmonton Oil Kings	CAHL	—	—	—	—	—	—	—	—	—	—
1961–62	Edmonton Oil Kings	M-Cup	—	—	—	—	—	21	8	11	19	8
1962–63	Edmonton Oil Kings	CAHL	—	—	—	—	—	—	—	—	—	—
1962–63	Edmonton Oil Kings	M-Cup	—	—	—	—	—	20	17	13	30	14
1963–64	Edmonton Oil Kings	CAHL	37	27	53	80	19	5	4	1	5	0
1963–64	Edmonton Oil Kings	M-Cup	—	—	—	—	—	19	18	25	43	18
1963–64	Cincinnati Wings	CHL	1	0	1	1	5	—	—	—	—	—
1964–65	Charlotte Checkers	EHL	30	27	14	41	50	—	—	—	—	—
1964–65	Pittsburgh Hornets	AHL	30	7	16	23	16	4	1	0	1	2
1964–65	Detroit Red Wings	NHL	3	0	0	0	0	—	—	—	—	—
1965–66	Memphis Wings	CHL	68	13	47	60	44	—	—	—	—	—
CHL totals			69	13	48	61	49	—	—	—	—	—
NHL totals			3	0	0	0	0	—	—	—	—	—

== See also ==
- List of ice hockey players who died during their playing career
