= Bill Goldsworthy =

Canadian ice hockey player (1944–1996)

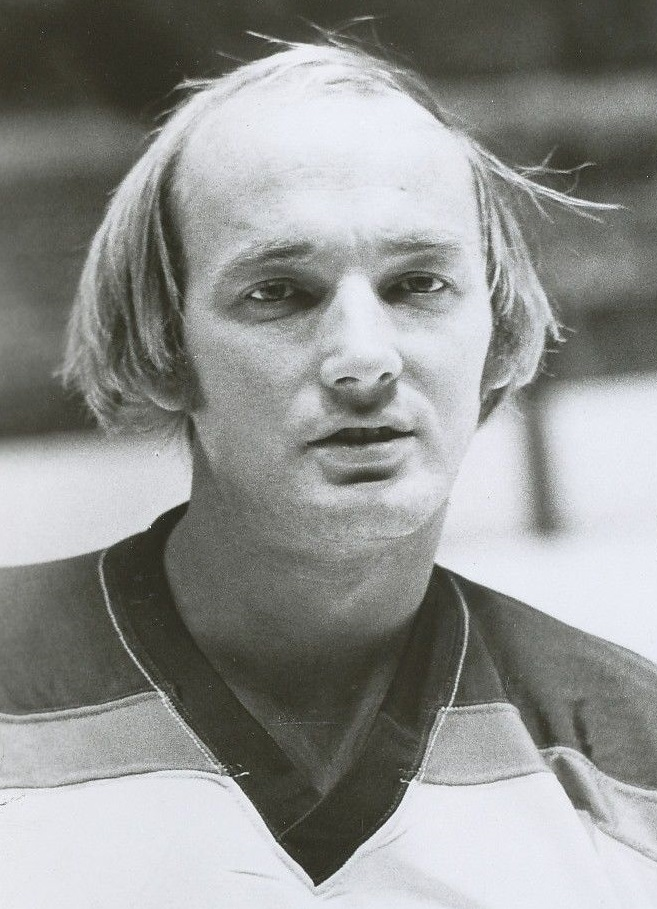
- Goldsworthy in 1976
- Born: August 24, 1944 Waterloo, Ontario, Canada
- Died: March 29, 1996 (aged 51) Minneapolis, Minnesota, U.S.
- Height: 6 ft 1 in (185 cm)
- Weight: 190 lb (86 kg; 13 st 8 lb)
- Position: Right wing
- Shot: Right
- Played for: Boston Bruins; Minnesota North Stars; New York Rangers; Indianapolis Racers; Edmonton Oilers
- National team: Canada
- Playing career: 1964–1979

William Alfred Goldsworthy (August 24, 1944 – March 29, 1996) was a Canadian professional ice hockey right winger who played for three teams in the National Hockey League for 14 seasons between 1964 and 1978, mostly with the Minnesota North Stars. He retired from playing after two partial seasons in the World Hockey Association.

== Playing career ==
Signed by the Boston Bruins of the NHL as a teenager, Goldsworthy played his junior days with the Bruins' Ontario Hockey Association affiliate Niagara Falls Flyers, a powerful team with future NHL stars Derek Sanderson, Bernie Parent, Jean Pronovost, Don Marcotte, Doug Favell and Rosaire Paiement among numerous others. Even with such a strong squad, Goldsworthy finished second and third in the team scoring his final two seasons with the club, en route to a Memorial Cup finals appearance in 1963 and winning it outright in 1965 in a series marked by brawls and suspensions. The latter season saw Goldsworthy's NHL debut, playing two scoreless games with the Bruins.

Goldsworthy's first two NHL goals came on December 12, 1965, in Boston's 5–3 loss to Detroit at Boston Garden.

With big league jobs tight in the days of the Original Six, Goldsworthy served a minor league apprenticeship the next two seasons, playing with the Oklahoma City Blazers of the Central Hockey League and the Buffalo Bisons of the American Hockey League between occasional call-ups to Boston.

As it did with many other players, league expansion in 1967 gave Goldsworthy a full-time spot in the NHL. Drafted in the mid-rounds by the Minnesota North Stars, he became an immediate starter, showing his promise in the playoffs in Minnesota's debut season, scoring eight goals and fifteen points in fourteen games as the North Stars came within a game of reaching the Stanley Cup finals. His true break-out season came in 1969–70, when he scored 36 goals to begin a stretch where teamed with skilled playmakers such as Dennis Hextall and Jude Drouin, he scored thirty or more goals in five of the next six seasons to become the North Stars' first great scoring star.

His best offensive season was the 1973–74 season, when he set career highs in goals with 48 and points with 74, which saw him just missing a nomination to the Second All-Star Team at right wing. He cemented his popularity with Minnesota fans with the "Goldy Shuffle," a celebration Goldsworthy performed after each goal at home. Named team captain in 1974–75 after Ted Harris' trade, Goldsworthy served in that capacity for two seasons.

By 1976–77, the North Stars were in a rebuilding mode, having failed to make the playoffs in three years. In a decline due to an alcoholism problem that would become chronic, Goldsworthy was dealt to the New York Rangers. Early the next season, his skills were in a sharp decline, he was the first NHL player traded outright to a World Hockey Association squad, the Indianapolis Racers where he was player-coach. He was further dealt to the Edmonton Oilers for the 1978–79 season, where he played 17 games to finish out his playing career; he scored his final goal as a professional player with a goal in Game 3 of the Avco Cup Finals.

== International play ==
Goldsworthy was a part of Team Canada in the 1972 Summit Series, but played in only three games, scoring a goal and an assist.

== Retirement and final years ==
Goldsworthy played 771 career NHL games, scoring 283 goals and 258 assists for 541 points, and added 18 goals and 19 assists in 40 playoff games. The North Stars retired his jersey number 8 on February 15, 1992.

After his retirement, Goldsworthy went into coaching, most notably for the Louisville Icehawks of the ECHL. He was also a scout for the San Jose Sharks.

Bill Goldsworthy died in 1996 of complications from AIDS, the first professional hockey player publicly known to have the disease. He was diagnosed in November 1994, and told the St. Paul Pioneer Press in 1995 that his health problems stemmed from drinking and promiscuity. He was buried in Lakewood Cemetery in Minneapolis.

== Awards and achievements ==
- Played in four NHL All-Star Games (1970, 1972, 1974, 1976).
- Retired as the leading goal and point scorer for the North Stars franchise.
- Was the first player for a post-Original Six expansion team to score 200 and 250 goals.

== Career statistics ==
=== Regular season and playoffs ===
			Regular season					Playoffs
Season	Team	League	GP	G	A	Pts	PIM	GP	G	A	Pts	PIM
1962–63	Niagara Falls Flyers	OHA-Jr.	50	7	11	18	71	9	1	2	3	8
1962–63	Niagara Falls Flyers	MC	—	—	—	—	—	16	3	7	10	39
1963–64	Niagara Falls Flyers	OHA-Jr.	56	21	47	68	91	4	0	3	3	4
1964–65	Niagara Falls Flyers	OHA-Jr.	54	28	27	55	164	11	5	11	16	26
1964–65	Boston Bruins	NHL	2	0	0	0	0	—	—	—	—	—
1964–65	Niagara Falls Flyers	MC	—	—	—	—	—	13	11	7	18	37
1965–66	Oklahoma City Blazers	CPHL	22	2	5	7	65	2	1	0	1	4
1965–66	Boston Bruins	NHL	13	3	1	4	6	—	—	—	—	—
1966–67	Oklahoma City Blazers	CPHL	11	4	1	5	14	—	—	—	—	—
1966–67	Buffalo Bisons	AHL	22	9	11	20	42	—	—	—	—	—
1966–67	Boston Bruins	NHL	18	3	5	8	21	—	—	—	—	—
1967–68	Minnesota North Stars	NHL	68	14	19	33	68	14	8	7	15	12
1968–69	Memphis South Stars	CHL	6	4	0	4	6	—	—	—	—	—
1968–69	Minnesota North Stars	NHL	68	14	10	24	110	—	—	—	—	—
1969–70	Minnesota North Stars	NHL	75	36	29	65	89	6	4	3	7	6
1970–71	Minnesota North Stars	NHL	77	34	31	65	85	7	2	4	6	6
1971–72	Minnesota North Stars	NHL	78	31	31	62	59	7	2	3	5	6
1972–73	Minnesota North Stars	NHL	75	27	33	60	97	6	2	2	4	0
1973–74	Minnesota North Stars	NHL	74	48	26	74	73	—	—	—	—	—
1974–75	Minnesota North Stars	NHL	71	37	35	72	77	—	—	—	—	—
1975–76	Minnesota North Stars	NHL	68	24	22	46	47	—	—	—	—	—
1976–77	Minnesota North Stars	NHL	16	2	3	5	6	—	—	—	—	—
1976–77	New York Rangers	NHL	61	10	12	22	43	—	—	—	—	—
1977–78	New York Rangers	NHL	7	0	1	1	12	—	—	—	—	—
1977–78	New Haven Nighthawks	AHL	4	1	2	3	4	—	—	—	—	—
1977–78	Indianapolis Racers	WHA	32	8	10	18	10	—	—	—	—	—
1978–79	Edmonton Oilers	WHA	17	4	2	6	14	4	1	1	2	11
WHA totals			49	12	12	24	24	4	1	1	2	11
NHL totals			771	283	258	541	793	40	18	19	37	30

=== International ===
Year	Team	Event	GP	G	A	Pts	PIM
1972	Canada	SS	3	1	1	2	4

== Coaching record ==
Team	Year	Regular season						Postseason
Team	Year	G	W	L	T	Pts	Finish	Result
Indianapolis Racers	1977–78	29	8	20	1	(17)	8th in WHA	Missed playoffs

Preceded by Ted Harris	Minnesota North Stars captain 1974–76	Succeeded by Bill Hogaboam
