= CAHL =

CAHL may refer to:

- Canadian Amateur Hockey League (1898–1905)
- Canadian–American Hockey League (1926–1936), a professional ice hockey league
- Central Alberta Hockey League, an amateur ice hockey league that operated 1956–1965
