= Ted McAneeley =

Canadian ice hockey player

- Born: November 7, 1950 (age 75) Cranbrook, British Columbia, Canada
- Height: 5 ft 9 in (175 cm)
- Weight: 185 lb (84 kg; 13 st 3 lb)
- Position: Defence
- Shot: Left
- Played for: California Golden Seals; Edmonton Oilers
- NHL draft: 47th overall, 1970; California Golden Seals
- Playing career: 1970–1979

Edward Joseph McAneeley (born November 7, 1950) is a Canadian former professional ice hockey player. He played three seasons in the National Hockey League with the California Golden Seals and one in the World Hockey Association with the Edmonton Oilers between 1972 and 1976. His twin brother, Bob McAneeley, also played hockey, and the two were teammates with Edmonton in 1975–76.

== Career statistics ==
=== Regular season and playoffs ===
			Regular season					Playoffs
Season	Team	League	GP	G	A	Pts	PIM	GP	G	A	Pts	PIM
1966–67	Calgary Buffaloes	CMJHL	53	3	10	13	102	—	—	—	—	—
1967–68	Edmonton Oil Kings	WCHL	46	2	5	7	114	10	0	0	0	0
1968–69	Edmonton Oil Kings	WCHL	52	8	19	27	171	17	1	7	8	10
1969–70	Edmonton Oil Kings	WCHL	60	29	25	54	92	16	3	9	12	79
1970–71	Providence Reds	AHL	60	4	3	7	71	10	0	0	0	2
1971–72	Baltimore Clippers	AHL	61	3	14	17	61	18	1	1	2	61
1972–73	California Golden Seals	NHL	77	4	13	17	75	—	—	—	—	—
1973–74	California Golden Seals	NHL	72	4	20	24	62	—	—	—	—	—
1974–75	California Golden Seals	NHL	9	0	2	2	4	—	—	—	—	—
1974–75	Salt Lake Golden Eagles	CHL	63	9	41	50	147	11	1	4	5	18
1975–76	Edmonton Oilers	WHA	79	2	17	19	71	4	0	0	0	4
1976–77	Spokane Flyers	WIHL	56	4	21	25	42	—	—	—	—	—
1977–78	Spokane Flyers	WIHL	56	6	17	23	160	—	—	—	—	—
1978–79	Spokane Flyers	PHL	55	10	28	38	95	—	—	—	—	—
WHA totals			79	2	17	19	71	4	0	0	0	4
NHL totals			158	8	35	43	141	—	—	—	—	—
