= Jamie Kennedy (ice hockey) =

Canadian ice hockey player (born 1946)

- Born: September 7, 1946 (age 79) Charlottetown, Prince Edward Island, Canada
- Height: 5 ft 8 in (173 cm)
- Weight: 175 lb (79 kg; 12 st 7 lb)
- Position: Centre
- Shot: Left
- Played for: Jersey Devils; Long Island Ducks; New York Raiders; Syracuse Blazers; Winston-Salem Polar Twins
- Playing career: 1968–1976

Jamie Kennedy (born September 7, 1946) is a Canadian former professional ice hockey centre who played 54 games for the New York Raiders of the World Hockey Association. He scored four goals and six assists for 10 points. Kennedy was inducted into the Prince Edward Island Sports Hall of Fame in 2011.

== Career statistics ==
=== Regular season and playoffs ===
			Regular season					Playoffs
Season	Team	League	GP	G	A	Pts	PIM	GP	G	A	Pts	PIM
1968–69	Jersey Devils	EHL	66	40	35	75	44	––	––	––	––	––
1969–70	Jersey Devils	EHL	67	49	28	77	70	––	––	––	––	––
1970–71	Jersey Devils	EHL	74	46	55	101	70	––	––	––	––	––
1971–72	Jersey Devils	EHL	75	50	42	92	119	––	––	––	––	––
1972–73	Long Island Ducks	EHL	15	12	11	23	2	––	––	––	––	––
1972–73	New York Raiders	WHA	54	4	6	10	11	––	––	––	––	––
1973–74	Syracuse Blazers	NAHL	71	44	49	93	65	15	13	9	22	4
1974–75	Winston–Salem Polar Twins	SHL	71	37	40	77	64	7	3	3	6	10
1975–76	Winston–Salem Polar Twins	SHL	70	22	33	55	75	4	1	1	2	0
WHA totals			54	4	6	10	11	—	—	—	—	—
