= Bob Falkenberg =

Canadian ice hockey player

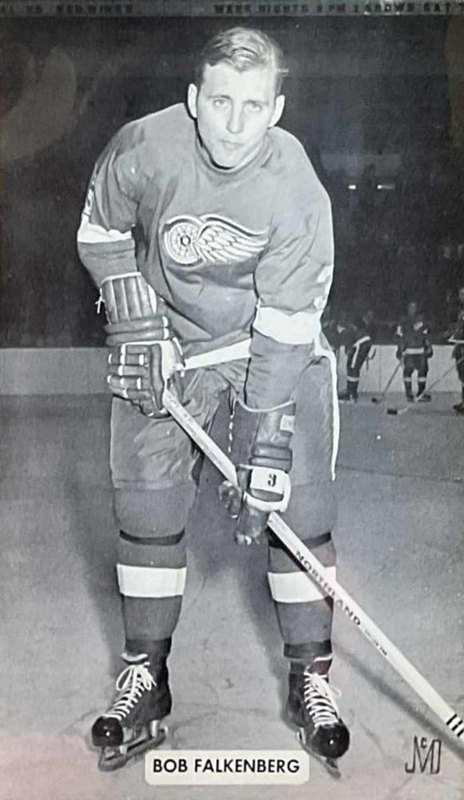
- Born: January 1, 1946 (age 80) Stettler, Alberta, Canada
- Height: 6 ft 0 in (183 cm)
- Weight: 190 lb (86 kg; 13 st 8 lb)
- Position: Defenceman
- Shot: Left
- Played for: Detroit Red Wings; Alberta/Edmonton Oilers; San Diego Mariners
- Playing career: 1966–1978

Robert Arthur "Steady" Falkenberg (born January 1, 1946) is a Canadian retired professional ice hockey defenceman who played 54 games in the National Hockey League with the Detroit Red Wings between 1966 and 1971 and 378 games in the World Hockey Association with Alberta/Edmonton Oilers, and San Diego Mariners between 1972 and 1978.

== Playing career ==
During his eight seasons with the Wings, Falkenberg spent the majority of his time with their farm teams in the minor professional leagues (American Hockey League, Central Hockey League). Falkenberg jumped to the new WHA for its inaugural (1972–73) season, where he consistently played the next five seasons with the Alberta Oilers (renamed Edmonton in their second season), then the Mariners. He retired from hockey after a brief two games, back with the Oilers, at the start of his sixth WHA season (1977–78).

== Career statistics ==
=== Regular season and playoffs ===
			Regular season					Playoffs
Season	Team	League	GP	G	A	Pts	PIM	GP	G	A	Pts	PIM
1962–63	Edmonton Oil Kings	CAHL	—	—	—	—	—	—	—	—	—	—
1962–63	Edmonton Oil Kings	M-Cup	—	—	—	—	—	20	6	10	16	4
1963–64	Edmonton Oil Kings	CAHL	14	3	12	15	0	5	1	3	4	0
1963–64	Edmonton Oil Kings	M-Cup	—	—	—	—	—	19	1	5	6	2
1964–65	Edmonton Oil Kings	ASHL	—	—	—	—	—	5	1	2	3	2
1964–65	Edmonton Oil Kings	M-Cup	—	—	—	—	—	20	6	11	17	31
1965–66	Edmonton Oil Kings	ASHL	27	6	9	15	34	11	3	4	7	11
1965–66	Memphis Wings	CHL	3	0	1	1	0	—	—	—	—	—
1965–66	Edmonton Oil Kings	M-Cup	—	—	—	—	—	19	11	18	29	30
1966–67	Detroit Red Wings	NHL	16	1	1	2	10	—	—	—	—	—
1966–67	Pittsburgh Hornets	AHL	53	2	15	17	28	—	—	—	—	—
1967–68	Detroit Red Wings	NHL	20	0	3	3	10	—	—	—	—	—
1967–68	Fort Worth Wings	CHL	48	2	13	15	57	—	—	—	—	—
1968–69	Detroit Red Wings	NHL	5	0	0	0	0	—	—	—	—	—
1968–69	Baltimore Clippers	AHL	4	0	1	1	0	—	—	—	—	—
1968–69	Fort Worth Wings	CHL	51	2	8	10	26	—	—	—	—	—
1969–70	Cleveland Barons	AHL	58	1	17	18	57	—	—	—	—	—
1970–71	Detroit Red Wings	NHL	9	0	1	1	6	—	—	—	—	—
1970–71	Fort Worth Wings	CHL	61	2	31	33	118	4	0	2	2	2
1971–72	Detroit Red Wings	NHL	4	0	0	0	2	—	—	—	—	—
1971–72	Tidewater Wings	AHL	74	4	21	25	57	—	—	—	—	—
1972–73	Alberta Oilers	WHA	76	6	23	29	44	—	—	—	—	—
1973–74	Edmonton Oilers	WHA	78	3	14	17	32	5	0	2	2	14
1974–75	San Diego Mariners	WHA	78	2	18	20	42	10	0	1	1	4
1975–76	San Diego Mariners	WHA	79	3	13	16	31	11	1	2	3	6
1976–77	San Diego Mariners	WHA	64	0	6	6	34	2	0	0	0	0
1977–78	Edmonton Oilers	WHA	2	0	0	0	0	—	—	—	—	—
WHA totals			377	14	74	88	183	28	1	5	6	24
NHL totals			54	1	5	6	26	—	—	—	—	—
