= Derek Harker =

Canadian ice hockey player

- Born: January 7, 1951 Magrath, Alberta, Canada
- Died: December 20, 2001 (aged 50) Calgary, Alberta, Canada
- Height: 6 ft 0 in (183 cm)
- Weight: 185 lb (84 kg; 13 st 3 lb)
- Position: Defence
- Shot: Left
- Played for: WHA; Alberta Oilers; Philadelphia Blazers; CHL; Kansas City Blues; EHL; Long Island Ducks; Roanoke Valley Rebels; IHL; Port Huron Wings; Flint Generals; SHL; Winston-Salem Polar Twins; Hampton Gulls; Tidewater Sharks; NAHL; Buffalo Norsemen
- NHL draft: 52nd overall, 1971; St. Louis Blues
- Playing career: 1971–1976

Derek William Harker (January 7, 1951 – December 20, 2001) is a Canadian former professional ice hockey defenceman. After three years in junior hockey with the Edmonton Oil Kings, he was selected by the St. Louis Blues in the fourth round (52nd overall) of the 1971 NHL Amateur Draft.

Harker played the majority of his professional career with teams in the minor leagues (EHL, CHL, IHL, SHL, NAHL).

During the inaugural 1972–73 season of the World Hockey Association, Harker played 28 games in that major league – one with the Alberta Oilers and 27 with the Philadelphia Blazers.

Harker died on December 20, 2001; he was 50 years old.

== Career statistics ==
=== Regular season and playoffs ===
			Regular season					Playoffs
Season	Team	League	GP	G	A	Pts	PIM	GP	G	A	Pts	PIM
1968–69	Edmonton–Swift Current	WCHL	54	5	17	22	95	––	––	––	––	––
1969–70	Edmonton Oil Kings	WCHL	Statistics Unavailable
1970–71	Edmonton Oil Kings	WCHL	64	7	38	45	144	––	––	––	––	––
1971–72	Long Island Ducks	EHL	5	0	3	3	8	––	––	––	––	––
1971–72	Kansas City Blues	CHL	10	0	0	0	4	––	––	––	––	––
1971–72	Port Huron Wings	IHL	14	0	7	7	15	––	––	––	––	––
1971–72	Flint Generals	IHL	18	0	2	2	34	––	––	––	––	––
1972–73	Roanoke Valley Rebels	EHL	18	1	10	11	45	14	1	0	1	28
1972–73	Alberta Oilers	WHA	1	0	0	0	0	––	––	––	––	––
1972–73	Philadelphia Blazers	WHA	27	0	5	5	46	––	––	––	––	––
1973–74	Winston–Salem Polar Twins	SHL	51	3	20	23	72	7	0	3	3	18
1974–75	Hampton Gulls	SHL	68	4	18	22	180	13	0	5	5	20
1975–76	Tidewater Sharks	SHL	65	1	18	19	38	––	––	––	––	––
1975–76	Buffalo Norsemen	NAHL	10	0	2	2	4	4	0	0	0	2
WHA totals			28	0	5	5	46	—	—	—	—	—
