= Al Hamilton =

Canadian ice hockey player

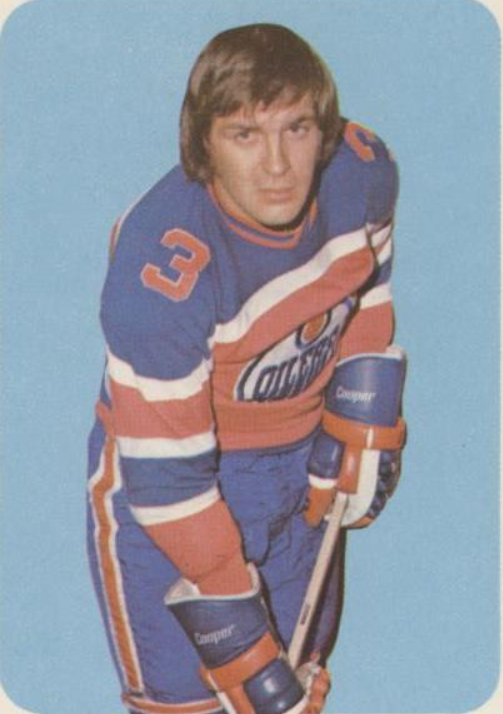
- Hamilton in 1973
- Born: August 20, 1946 (age 79) Flin Flon, Manitoba, Canada
- Height: 6 ft 1 in (185 cm)
- Weight: 195 lb (88 kg; 13 st 13 lb)
- Position: Defence
- Shot: Right
- Played for: New York Rangers; Buffalo Sabres; Alberta/Edmonton Oilers
- National team: Canada
- Playing career: 1964–1980

Allan Guy Hamilton (born August 20, 1946) is a Canadian former ice hockey defenceman, most notably with the Edmonton Oilers of the World Hockey Association. He also played in the National Hockey League for the Oilers, as well as the New York Rangers and Buffalo Sabres.

== Playing career ==
Signed by the New York Rangers of the National Hockey League (NHL) as a teenager, Hamilton spent his junior career with the Edmonton Oil Kings. He met with great success in juniors, being one of the rare players to play in the Memorial Cup tournament for three consecutive years. His final season in 1966 with the Oil Kings saw the team win the Memorial Cup, led by Hamilton's remarkable 82 points in 55 regular season and playoff games, drawing frequent comparisons with his junior contemporary Bobby Orr of the Oshawa Generals. In fact in Hamilton's Memorial Cup-winning final junior year, Hamilton and Orr highlighted the championship game by trading end-to-end rushes.

Hamilton made a rather auspicious debut with the Rangers on a Wednesday night hockey broadcast. As Frank Mahovlich was skating down the boards, Hamilton entered the playing surface from the bench on a line change and knocked out the unsuspecting Mahovlich with a thundering shoulder check that required smelling salts to help him retain consciousness.. While he played a few games for the Rangers in 1966, he toiled for the next three seasons in the minors, winning all-star accolades for the Omaha Knights of the Central Hockey League in 1967 and spending the two years thereafter with the Buffalo Bisons of the American Hockey League. Hamilton finally cracked the Rangers' lineup in 1969, playing in 59 games, but he had arrived at a time when the Ranger defence was stacked and a new kid named Brad Park was turning heads. Hamilton was left unprotected for the 1970 NHL Expansion Draft and was selected by the Buffalo Sabres as their third choice.

However, when the World Hockey Association began in 1972, Hamilton jumped over to the fledgling league, signing with the Alberta Oilers for their first season. Named the team's captain at the age of 26, he immediately responded with a 61-point season, his best as a pro, A superb defender and leader, he captained the Oilers for four seasons and was chosen to represent Canada in the 1974 Summit Series against the Soviet Union. Overcoming injuries that frequently struck—and which cost him most of the 1975 season—Hamilton remained the leader of the Oilers' defence corps for the whole of the WHA's history. When the Oilers joined the NHL for the 1979–80 NHL season, Hamilton had set the record for most games played (455) and most points scored (311) by any player while a WHA Oiler.

== Retirement ==
Hamilton finished his career back in the NHL, playing 31 games with the Edmonton Oilers in 1979–80; however, beset by a lingering eye injury from the previous season, he retired at season's end. His number 3 was the first retired by the franchise on October 10, 1980. As of 2024, Hamilton is the only Oiler not to be a member of the 1980s Stanley Cup teams to have his number retired.

For the WHA all-time, he is 13th in games played, 15th in assists, 40th in points, and 38th in penalty minutes. He was also the franchise leader for the WHA Oilers in games, assists, and points, and second in penalty minutes.

Hamilton remains active with the Oiler alumni and community affairs in the Edmonton area.

== Family ==
His son, Steve Hamilton (born 1973) is the current head coach with the Everett Silvertips of the Western Hockey League.

His other son, Andrew Hamilton, currently plays semi professional hockey for the Adelaide Adrenaline of the Australian Ice Hockey League.

== Awards and achievements ==
- Memorial Cup Championship (1966)
- CPHL Second All-Star Team (1967)
- WHA Second All-Star Team (1974)
- Member of Team Canada in the 1974 Summit Series
- WHA First All-Star Team (1978)
- "Honoured Member" of the Manitoba Hockey Hall of Fame
- Inaugural member of the World Hockey Association Hall of Fame
- Jersey #3 retired by the Edmonton Oilers

== Career statistics ==
=== Regular season and playoffs ===
			Regular season					Playoffs
Season	Team	League	GP	G	A	Pts	PIM	GP	G	A	Pts	PIM
1963–64	Edmonton Oil Kings	CAHL	14	4	7	11	26	5	2	3	5	15
1963–64	Edmonton Oil Kings	M-Cup	—	—	—	—	—	19	4	8	12	15
1964–65	Edmonton Oil Kings	CAHL	30	10	15	25	—	—	—	—	—	—
1964–65	St. Paul Rangers	CPHL	3	0	2	2	0	—	—	—	—	—
1964–65	Edmonton Oil Kings	M-Cup	—	—	—	—	—	20	4	12	16	40
1965–66	Edmonton Oil Kings	ASHL	28	15	22	37	99	8	3	10	13	16
1965–66	New York Rangers	NHL	4	0	0	0	0	—	—	—	—	—
1965–66	Edmonton Oil Kings	M-Cup	—	—	—	—	—	19	9	23	32	29
1966–67	Omaha Knights	CPHL	68	11	25	36	96	12	4	3	7	16
1967–68	New York Rangers	NHL	2	0	0	0	0	—	—	—	—	—
1967–68	Buffalo Bisons	AHL	72	9	21	30	82	5	0	4	4	23
1968–69	New York Rangers	NHL	16	0	0	0	8	1	0	0	0	0
1968–69	Buffalo Bisons	AHL	41	4	14	18	61	6	0	4	4	12
1969–70	New York Rangers	NHL	59	0	5	5	54	5	0	0	0	2
1970–71	Buffalo Sabres	NHL	69	2	28	30	71	—	—	—	—	—
1971–72	Buffalo Sabres	NHL	76	4	30	34	105	—	—	—	—	—
1972–73	Alberta Oilers	WHA	78	11	50	61	124	1	0	0	0	2
1973–74	Edmonton Oilers	WHA	78	14	45	59	104	4	1	1	2	15
1974–75	Edmonton Oilers	WHA	25	1	13	14	42	—	—	—	—	—
1975–76	Edmonton Oilers	WHA	54	2	32	34	78	4	0	1	1	6
1976–77	Edmonton Oilers	WHA	81	8	37	45	60	5	0	4	4	4
1977–78	Edmonton Oilers	WHA	59	11	43	54	46	—	—	—	—	—
1978–79	Edmonton Oilers	WHA	80	6	38	44	38	13	4	5	9	4
1979–80	Edmonton Oilers	NHL	31	4	15	19	20	1	0	0	0	0
1979–80	Houston Apollos	CHL	4	0	0	0	0	—	—	—	—	—
WHA totals			455	53	258	311	492	27	5	11	16	31
NHL totals			257	10	78	88	258	7	0	0	0	2

=== International ===
Year	Team	Event	GP	G	A	Pts	PIM
1974	Canada	SS	3	0	1	1	4

Preceded by Position created	Edmonton Oilers captain 1972–76	Succeeded by Glen Sather
