= Ron Anderson (ice hockey, born 1945) =

Canadian ice hockey player (b. 1945)

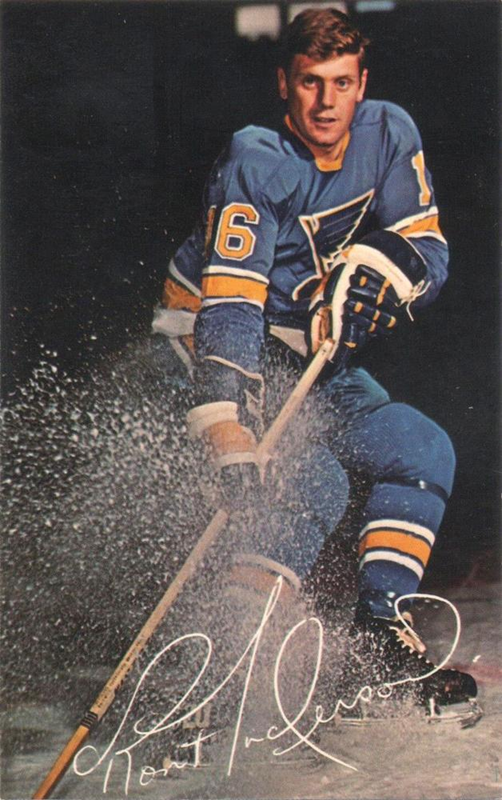
- Anderson in 1969 photo
- Born: July 29, 1945 (age 80) Red Deer, Alberta, Canada
- Height: 6 ft 0 in (183 cm)
- Weight: 170 lb (77 kg; 12 st 2 lb)
- Position: Right wing
- Shot: Right
- Played for: Detroit Red Wings; Los Angeles Kings; St. Louis Blues; Buffalo Sabres; Alberta/Edmonton Oilers
- Playing career: 1965–1975

Ronald Chester "Goings" Anderson (born July 29, 1945) is a Canadian former ice hockey right winger.

== Career ==
Anderson played in the National Hockey League (NHL) for the Detroit Red Wings, Los Angeles Kings, St. Louis Blues, and Buffalo Sabres between 1967 and 1972. He also played in the World Hockey Association (WHA) with the Alberta/Edmonton Oilers between 1972 and 1974. On October 11, 1972, in the first WHA regular season game (versus the Ottawa Nationals), he scored the first goal in WHA history.

In his NHL career, Anderson played in 251 games, scoring 28 goals and adding 30 assists. He played in 92 WHA games, scoring 19 goals and adding 17 assists.

== Career statistics ==
=== Regular season and playoffs ===
			Regular season					Playoffs
Season	Team	League	GP	G	A	Pts	PIM	GP	G	A	Pts	PIM
1962–63	Edmonton Oil Kings	CAHL	—	—	—	—	—	—	—	—	—	—
1962–63	Edmonton Oil Kings	M-Cup	—	—	—	—	—	20	1	3	4	8
1963–64	Edmonton Oil Kings	CAHL	14	6	5	11	4	3	0	0	0	2
1963–64	Edmonton Oil Kings	M-Cup	—	—	—	—	—	17	8	5	13	17
1964–65	Edmonton Oil Kings	ASHL	—	—	—	—	—	5	5	2	7	6
1964–65	Edmonton Oil Kings	M-Cup	—	—	—	—	—	19	11	17	28	42
1965–66	Edmonton Oil Kings	ASHL	30	15	19	34	51	11	7	3	10	31
1965–66	Hamilton Red Wings	OHA	6	1	0	1	2	—	—	—	—	—
1965–66	Edmonton Oil Kings	M-Cup	—	—	—	—	—	17	11	10	21	21
1965–66	Memphis Wings	CPHL	3	1	3	4	4	—	—	—	—	—
1966–67	Memphis Wings	CPHL	39	12	22	34	51	7	2	2	4	2
1967–68	Fort Worth Wings	CPHL	39	21	19	40	46	—	—	—	—	—
1967–68	Detroit Red Wings	NHL	18	2	0	2	13	—	—	—	—	—
1968–69	Detroit Red Wings	NHL	7	0	0	0	8	—	—	—	—	—
1968–69	Los Angeles Kings	NHL	56	3	5	8	36	—	—	—	—	—
1969–70	Buffalo Bisons	AHL	9	8	3	11	16	—	—	—	—	—
1969–70	St. Louis Blues	NHL	59	9	9	18	36	—	—	—	—	—
1970–71	Buffalo Sabres	NHL	74	14	12	26	44	—	—	—	—	—
1971–72	Buffalo Sabres	NHL	37	0	4	4	19	—	—	—	—	—
1971–72	Salt Lake Golden Eagles	WHL	26	7	10	17	8	—	—	—	—	—
1972–73	Alberta Oilers	WHA	77	32	48	80	24	1	0	0	0	0
1973–74	Edmonton Oilers	WHA	19	5	2	7	6	1	0	0	0	0
1974–75	Mohawk Valley Comets	NAHL	64	18	34	52	21	4	3	3	6	2
WHA totals			92	19	17	36	49	2	0	0	0	0
NHL totals			251	28	30	58	146	5	0	0	0	2
