= Jean-Yves Cartier =

Canadian ice hockey player

- Born: June 18, 1949 (age 76) Verdun, Quebec, Canada
- Height: 5 ft 9 in (175 cm)
- Weight: 180 lb (82 kg; 12 st 12 lb)
- Position: Defence
- Shot: Left
- Played for: WHA; Quebec Nordiques; EHL; Rhode Island Eagles; NAHL; Maine Nordiques
- NHL draft: Undrafted
- Playing career: 1972–1974

Jean-Yves Cartier (born June 18, 1949) is a Canadian former professional ice hockey defenceman.

During the 1972–73 season, Cartier played 15 games in the World Hockey Association with the Quebec Nordiques.

== Career statistics ==
=== Regular season and playoffs ===
			Regular season					Playoffs
Season	Team	League	GP	G	A	Pts	PIM	GP	G	A	Pts	PIM
1964–65	Verdun Maple Leafs	MMJHL	28	0	6	6	38	—	—	—	—	—
1965–66	Verdun Maple Leafs	MMJHL	38	2	15	17	80	—	—	—	—	—
1966–67	Verdun Maple Leafs	MMJHL	37	7	22	29	74	—	—	—	—	—
1972–73	Rhode Island Eagles	EHL	48	3	16	19	39	4	0	1	1	2
1972–73	Quebec Nordiques	WHA	15	0	3	3	8	—	—	—	—	—
1973–74	Maine Nordiques	NAHL	4	0	1	1	14	—	—	—	—	—
WHA totals			15	0	3	3	8	—	—	—	—	—
