= John Fisher (ice hockey) =

- Born: 21 December 1947 (age 78) Ayr, Scotland, United Kingdom
- Height: 5 ft 11 in (180 cm)
- Weight: 185 lb (84 kg; 13 st 3 lb)
- Position: Centre
- Shot: Left
- Played for: WHA; Alberta Oilers; CHL; Dallas Black Hawks; Fort Worth Wings; EHL; Greensboro Generals; Nashville Dixie Flyers; IHL; Port Huron Wings
- NHL draft: Undrafted
- Playing career: 1968–1973

John Fisher (born 21 December 1947) is a Scotland-born Canadian former professional ice hockey player.

== Early life ==
Fisher was born in Ayr, Scotland, but played his junior hockey in Canada with the Moose Jaw Canucks and the St. Catharines Black Hawks.

== Career ==
Fisher played the majority of his career with teams in the minor professional leagues (CHL, IHL, EHL). He played 40 games with the Alberta Oilers of the World Hockey Association during the league's inaugural 1972–73 season.

== Career statistics ==
			Regular season					Playoffs
Season	Team	League	GP	G	A	Pts	PIM	GP	G	A	Pts	PIM
1966–67	St. Catharines Black Hawks	OHA	48	16	25	41	20	—	—	—	—	—
1967–68	St. Catharines Black Hawks	OHA	53	27	34	61	10	—	—	—	—	—
1968–69	Dallas Black Hawks	CHL	2	0	0	0	0	—	—	—	—	—
1968–69	Greensboro Generals	EHL	68	31	48	79	14	8	6	3	9	0
1969–70	Nashville Dixie Flyers	EHL	9	0	0	0	0	—	—	—	—	—
1970–71	Fort Worth Wings	CHL	70	2	7	9	0	2	0	0	0	0
1971–72	Fort Worth Wings	CHL	33	3	7	10	4	—	—	—	—	—
1971–72	Port Huron Wings	IHL	24	5	11	16	6	15	1	4	5	4
1972–73	Alberta Oilers	WHA	40	0	5	5	0	—	—	—	—	—
WHA totals			40	0	5	5	0	—	—	—	—	—
