= Jack Norris (ice hockey) =

Canadian ice hockey player (b. 1942)

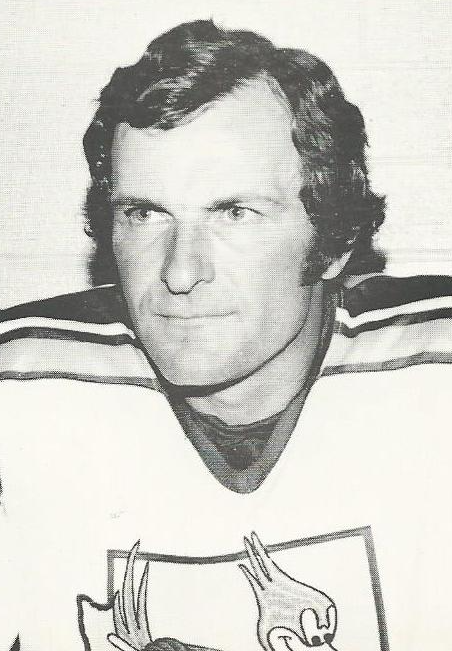
- Born: August 5, 1942 (age 82); Delisle, Saskatchewan, Canada
- Height: 5 ft 10 in (178 cm)
- Weight: 175 lb (79 kg; 12 st 7 lb)
- Position: Goaltender
- Caught: Left
- Played for: Boston Bruins; Chicago Black Hawks; Los Angeles Kings; Alberta/Edmonton Oilers; Phoenix Roadrunners
- Playing career: 1963–1976

Jack "John" Wayne Norris (born August 5, 1942) is a Canadian former professional ice hockey goaltender. Norris played parts of four seasons in the National Hockey League, along with another four seasons in the World Hockey Association, between 1964 and 1976.

== Career ==
Norris joined the NHL with the Boston Bruins in the 1964–65 season, playing 23 games as the backup to Eddie Johnston, but lost his spot the following season to Gerry Cheevers. Norris was subsequently traded to the Chicago Black Hawks, where he played ten games over two seasons. Norris spent significant time in the minor leagues before eventually joining the Los Angeles Kings as the backup to Denis DeJordy.

After spending the 1971–72 season in the minor leagues, Norris joined the Alberta Oilers for the WHA's inaugural 1972–73 season. He spent two seasons as the starter with the Oilers (renamed Edmonton Oilers in 1973–74 season) and two more with the Phoenix Roadrunners before retiring in 1976.

== Career statistics ==
=== Regular season and playoffs ===
			Regular season									Playoffs
Season	Team	League	GP	W	L	T	MIN	GA	SO	GAA	SV%	GP	W	L	T	MIN	GA	SO	GAA	SV%
1959–60	Estevan Bruins	SJHL	19	—	—	—	1160	82	1	4.24	—	—	—	—	—	—	—	—	—
1960–61	Estevan Bruins	SJHL	49	—	—	—	2940	148	3	3.02	—	7	—	—	—	380	20	0	3.16	—
1961–62	Estevan Bruins	SJHL	42	—	—	—	2420	87	7	2.16	—	10	6	3	1	620	25	0	2.42	—
1962–63	Estevan Bruins	SJHL	54	—	—	—	3240	139	5	2ю57	—	12	7	4	1	740	37	0	3.00	—
1962–63	Estevan Bruins	M-Cup	—	—	—	—	—	—	—	—	—	6	2	4	0	370	23	0	3.73	—
1963–64	Los Angeles Blades	WHL	31	13	16	2	1836	115	2	3.71	—	8	4	4	—	491	31	0	3.79	—
1963–64	Minneapolis Bruins	CHL	4	2	1	1	240	19	0	4.75	—	—	—	—	—	—	—	—	—	—
1964–65	Boston Bruins	NHL	23	10	11	2	1379	85	1	3.70	.898	—	—	—	—	—	—	—	—	—
1964–65	Los Angeles Blades	WHL	38	18	19	1	2307	146	1	3.80	—	—	—	—	—	—	—	—	—	—
1965–66	Los Angeles Blades	WHL	20	5	15	0	1200	117	0	5.85	—	—	—	—	—	—	—	—	—	—
1965–66	Oklahoma City Blazers	CHL	18	9	7	2	1040	51	1	2.94	—	—	—	—	—	—	—	—	—	—
1966–67	Los Angeles Blades	WHL	35	14	17	3	2102	133	2	3.80	—	—	—	—	—	—	—	—	—	—
1967–68	Chicago Black Hawks	NHL	7	2	3	0	334	22	1	3.95	.869	—	—	—	—	—	—	—	—	—
1967–68	Dallas Black Hawks	CHL	39	13	15	10	2423	132	0	3.27	—	—	—	—	—	—	—	—	—	—
1968–69	Chicago Black Hawks	NHL	3	1	0	0	100	10	0	6.00	.844	—	—	—	—	—	—	—	—	—
1968–69	Dallas Black Hawks	CHL	36	—	—	—	2099	98	4	2.80	—	11	10	1	—	660	26	0	2.36	—
1969–70	Montreal Voyageurs	AHL	55	—	—	—	3265	149	4	2.74	—	8	4	4	—	495	24	1	2.91	—
1970–71	Los Angeles Kings	NHL	25	7	11	2	1305	85	0	3.91	.888	—	—	—	—	—	—	—	—	—
1971–72	Seattle Totems	WHL	38	5	28	5	2219	152	2	4.14	.887	—	—	—	—	—	—	—	—	—
1971–72	Springfield Kings	AHL	10	5	4	1	569	36	0	3.80	—	2	0	2	—	108	14	0	7.78	—
1972–73	Alberta Oilers	WHA	64	28	29	3	3702	189	1	3.06	.903	—	—	—	—	—	—	—	—	—
1973–74	Edmonton Oilers	WHA	53	23	24	1	2954	158	2	3.21	.898	3	0	2	—	111	9	0	4.86	—
1974–75	Phoenix Roadrunners	WHA	33	14	15	4	1962	107	1	3.27	.891	2	0	2	—	100	10	0	6.00	—
1975–76	Phoenix Roadrunners	WHA	41	21	14	4	2412	128	1	3.18	.891	5	2	3	—	298	17	0	3.42t	—
NHL totals			58	20	25	4	3118	202	2	3.89	.889	—	—	—	—	—	—	—	—	—
WHA totals			191	86	82	12	11,033	582	5	3.17	.897	10	2	7	—	509	36	0	4.24	—
