= Steve Carlyle =

Canadian ice hockey player and coach

- Born: March 10, 1950 (age 76) Lacombe, Alberta, Canada
- Height: 5 ft 10 in (178 cm)
- Weight: 180 lb (82 kg; 12 st 12 lb)
- Position: Defence
- Shot: Left
- Played for: Edmonton Oilers
- NHL draft: 31st overall, 1970; Montreal Canadiens
- Playing career: 1972–1976

Steve Carlyle (born March 10, 1950, in Lacombe, Alberta) is a Canadian former professional ice hockey defenceman and current coach. He was selected in the third round of the 1970 NHL Amateur Draft, 31st overall, by the Montreal Canadiens, but never played in the NHL. Carlyle joined the Alberta Oilers for the inaugural 1972–73 WHA season, staying with the renamed Edmonton Oilers until the 1975–76 WHA season.

Before being drafted, Carlyle played for the Edmonton Movers and Red Deer Rustlers of the AJHL and for the University of Alberta. Carlyle played for the Canadian National Team between 1970 and 1972. He made his WHA debut after being named Edmonton Athlete of the Year in 1972. On February 2, 1976, Carlyle and Kerry Ketter were traded to the New England Whalers for Paul Hurley and future considerations. Rather than report, Carlyle retired.

Following his professional career, Carlyle was an assistant coach with the Calgary Oval X-Treme of the Western Women's Hockey League and is currently the head coach of the women's Chinese National Team.

Carlyle was also the principal of the elementary school in Jasper, Alberta.

== Career statistics ==
			Regular Season					Playoffs
Season	Team	League	GP	G	A	Pts	PIM	GP	G	A	Pts	PIM
1967–68	Red Deer Rustlers	AJHL	--	12	27	39	65	--	--	--	--	--
1969–70	Red Deer Rustlers	AJHL	4	0	3	3	4	--	--	--	--	--
1972–73	Alberta Oilers	WHA	67	7	10	17	35	1	0	0	0	0
1973–74	Edmonton Oilers	WHA	50	2	13	15	18	5	0	1	1	4
1974–75	Edmonton Oilers	WHA	73	2	25	27	46	--	--	--	--	--
1975–76	Edmonton Oilers	WHA	28	0	11	11	10	--	--	--	--	--
WHA Totals			218	11	59	70	109	6	0	1	1	4
