= Brian Carlin =

Canadian ice hockey player (born 1950)

- Born: June 13, 1950 (age 74); Calgary, Alberta, Canada
- Height: 5 ft 10 in (178 cm)
- Weight: 175 lb (79 kg; 12 st 7 lb)
- Position: Left wing
- Shot: Left
- Played for: Los Angeles Kings; Alberta/Edmonton Oilers
- NHL draft: 86th overall, 1970; Los Angeles Kings
- Playing career: 1971–1974

Brian John Carlin (born June 13, 1950) is a Canadian former professional ice hockey player who played five games with the Los Angeles Kings during the 1971–72 season, then changed leagues to play nearly a full season with the Albert Oilers for the inaugural 1972–73 season, staying with the renamed Edmonton Oilers for five games in the 1973–74 season, after which he retired from hockey. Carlin was born in Calgary, Alberta and grew up in Gleichen, Alberta.

== Career statistics ==
=== Regular season and playoffs ===
			Regular season					Playoffs
Season	Team	League	GP	G	A	Pts	PIM	GP	G	A	Pts	PIM
1967–68	Calgary Centennials	WCHL	57	11	16	27	47	—	—	—	—	—
1968–69	Calgary Centennials	WCHL	56	15	14	29	40	11	3	1	4	—
1969–70	Calgary Centennials	WCHL	48	16	14	30	33	—	—	—	—	—
1970–71	Medicine Hat Tigers	WCHL	65	44	56	100	46	—	—	—	—	—
1971–72	Los Angeles Kings	NHL	5	1	0	1	0	—	—	—	—	—
1971–72	Springfield Kings	AHL	67	35	31	66	6	5	0	0	0	2
1972–73	Alberta Oilers	WHA	65	12	22	34	6	—	—	—	—	—
1973–74	Edmonton Oilers	WHA	5	1	0	1	0	—	—	—	—	—
1973–74	Winston-Salem Polar Twins	SHL	66	36	42	78	29	7	2	1	3	2
1974–75	Calgary Trojans	ASHL	—	—	—	—	—	—	—	—	—	—
1975–76	Calgary Trojans	ASHL	—	—	—	—	—	—	—	—	—	—
1976–77	Calgary Trojans	ASHL	20	18	20	38	10	—	—	—	—	—
WHA totals			70	13	22	35	6	—	—	—	—	—
NHL totals			5	1	0	1	0	—	—	—	—	—
