= Jim Harrison (ice hockey) =

Canadian ice hockey player

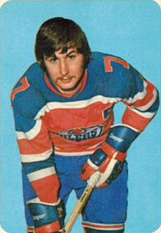
- Born: July 9, 1947 (age 79) Bonnyville, Alberta, Canada
- Height: 5 ft 11 in (180 cm)
- Weight: 185 lb (84 kg; 13 st 3 lb)
- Position: Centre
- Shot: Right
- Played for: NHL; Boston Bruins; Toronto Maple Leafs; Chicago Black Hawks; WHA; Alberta Oilers; Cleveland Crusaders; WHA/NHL; Edmonton Oilers
- Playing career: 1963–1980

James David Harrison (born July 9, 1947) is a Canadian former professional ice hockey player who played 324 games in the National Hockey League (NHL) and 232 games in the World Hockey Association. He played for the Boston Bruins, Toronto Maple Leafs, Alberta/Edmonton Oilers, Cleveland Crusaders, and Chicago Black Hawks.

Harrison was the Oilers' team-scoring champion in their inaugural (1972–73) season. In that season he also set the WHA record for most points in a game with 10 (3 goals, 7 assists) in an 11-3 win over the New York Raiders on January 30, 1973, a mark that was never surpassed in WHA history. Before starting his professional career, Harrison set a record in junior hockey for the WHL of fastest natural hat trick, having scored 3 goals in 24 seconds for the Estevan Bruins during a 6-5 win over the Regina Pats in December 1966.

== Career statistics ==
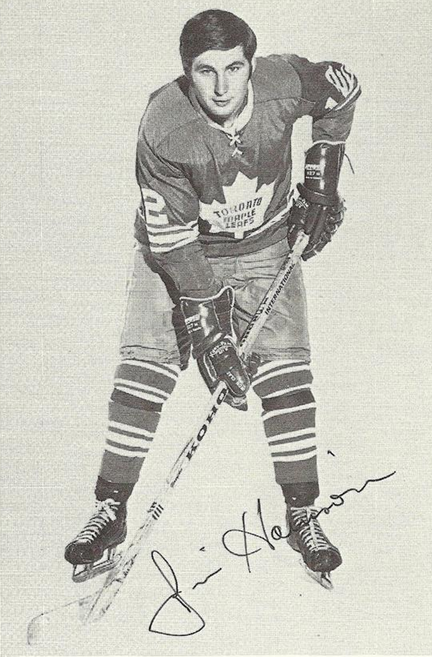
Jim Harrison for Toronto Maple Leafs in 1970 photo

=== Regular season and playoffs ===
			Regular season					Playoffs
Season	Team	League	GP	G	A	Pts	PIM	GP	G	A	Pts	PIM
1963–64	Kamloops Rockets	BCHL	25	8	11	19	—	—	—	—	—	—
1964–65	Estevan Bruins	SJHL	25	2	5	7	40	—	—	—	—	—
1965–66	Estevan Bruins	SJHL	60	39	37	76	119	11	8	1	9	21
1965–66	Estevan Bruins	MC	—	—	—	—	—	13	10	5	15	52
1965–66	Edmonton Oil Kings	MC	—	—	—	—	—	6	2	3	5	11
1966–67	Estevan Bruins	CMJHL	47	34	40	74	179	8	2	4	6	38
1967–68	Estevan Bruins	WCHL	46	32	43	75	222	14	13	22	35	29
1967–68	Estevan Bruins	MC	—	—	—	—	—	14	19	15	34	42
1968–69	Boston Bruins	NHL	16	1	2	3	21	—	—	—	—	—
1968–69	Oklahoma City Blazers	CHL	43	13	13	26	130	9	3	2	5	6
1969–70	Boston Bruins	NHL	23	3	1	4	16	—	—	—	—	—
1969–70	Toronto Maple Leafs	NHL	31	7	10	17	36	—	—	—	—	—
1970–71	Toronto Maple Leafs	NHL	78	13	20	33	108	6	0	1	1	33
1971–72	Toronto Maple Leafs	NHL	66	19	17	36	104	5	1	0	1	10
1972–73	Alberta Oilers	WHA	66	39	47	86	93	—	—	—	—	—
1973–74	Edmonton Oilers	WHA	47	24	45	69	99	—	—	—	—	—
1974–75	Cleveland Crusaders	WHA	60	20	22	42	106	5	1	2	3	4
1975–76	Cleveland Crusaders	WHA	59	34	38	72	62	3	0	1	1	9
1976–77	Chicago Black Hawks	NHL	60	18	23	41	97	2	0	0	0	0
1977–78	Chicago Black Hawks	NHL	26	2	8	10	31	—	—	—	—	—
1978–79	Chicago Black Hawks	NHL	21	4	5	9	22	—	—	—	—	—
1978–79	New Brunswick Hawks	AHL	2	0	0	0	0	—	—	—	—	—
1979–80	Edmonton Oilers	NHL	3	0	0	0	0	—	—	—	—	—
NHL totals			324	67	86	153	435	13	1	1	2	43
WHA totals			232	117	152	269	360	8	1	3	4	13

=== International ===
Year	Team	Event	GP	G	A	Pts	PIM
1974	Canada	SS	3	0	2	2	6

== Awards ==
- CMJHL Second All-Star Team – 1967
- WCJHL Second All-Star Team – 1968
