= Bill Morris (ice hockey) =

Canadian ice hockey player

- Born: June 26, 1949 (age 76) Toronto, Ontario, Canada
- Height: 6 ft 0 in (183 cm)
- Weight: 185 lb (84 kg; 13 st 3 lb)
- Position: Left wing
- Shot: Left
- Played for: Edmonton Oilers (WHA)
- NHL draft: Undrafted
- Playing career: 1971–1985

William John Morris (born June 26, 1949) is a Canadian former professional ice hockey player.

== Career ==
Morris began his career with the Long Island Ducks. He was also a member of the Winston-Salem Polar Twins. During the 1974–75 season, Morris played 36 games in the World Hockey Association with the Edmonton Oilers.

== Personal life ==
Morris's father, Frank Morris, played in the Canadian Football League.

== Career statistics ==
=== Regular season and playoffs ===
			Regular season					Playoffs
Season	Team	League	GP	G	A	Pts	PIM	GP	G	A	Pts	PIM
1969–70	Edmonton Monarchs	ASHL	Statistics Unavailable
1970–71	Edmonton Monarchs	ASHL	Statistics Unavailable
1971–72	Long Island Ducks	EHL	74	21	32	53	52	––	––	––	––	––
1972–73	Long Island Ducks	EHL	23	4	10	14	14	––	––	––	––	––
1973–74	Winston–Salem Polar Twins	SHL	53	13	24	37	18	7	6	8	14	4
1974–75	Edmonton Oilers	WHA	36	4	8	12	6	––	––	––	––	––
1974–75	Winston–Salem Polar Twins	SHL	30	21	18	39	26	––	––	––	––	––
1975–76	Winston–Salem Polar Twins	SHL	65	16	26	42	58	2	0	1	1	0
1976–77	Winston–Salem Polar Twins	SHL	38	15	28	43	59
1981–82	Winston–Salem Thunderbirds	ACHL	9	2	1	3	7	––	––	––	––	––
1983–84	Carolina Thunderbirds	ACHL	2	0	0	0	0	––	––	––	––	––
1984–85	Carolina Thunderbirds	ACHL	18	4	16	20	6	––	––	––	––	––
WHA totals			36	4	8	12	6	—	—	—	—	—
