= Dennis Kassian =

Canadian ice hockey player

- Born: July 14, 1941 (age 84) Vegreville, Alberta, Canada
- Height: 5 ft 11 in (180 cm)
- Weight: 170 lb (77 kg; 12 st 2 lb)
- Position: Left wing
- Shot: Left
- Played for: WHA; Alberta Oilers; AHL; Buffalo Bisons; EPHL; Sudbury Wolves; Syracuse Braves; CPHL; Indianapolis Capitols/Cincinnati Wings; Memphis Wings; WHL; Edmonton Flyers; Salt Lake Golden Eagles; SHL; Winston-Salem Polar Twins
- Playing career: 1961–1974

Dennis Kassian (born July 14, 1941) is a Canadian former professional ice hockey player.

During the 1972–73 season, Kassian played 50 games in the World Hockey Association with the Alberta Oilers, recording six goals and seven assists to go along with 14 penalty minutes.

Kassian also had a long career playing in various minor professional leagues across North America. He played four seasons in the American Hockey League with the Buffalo Bisons.

== Career statistics ==
=== Regular season and playoffs ===
			Regular season					Playoffs
Season	Team	League	GP	G	A	Pts	PIM	GP	G	A	Pts	PIM
1960–61	Edmonton Flyers	WHL	1	0	0	0	0	––	––	––	––	––
1960–61	Edmonton Oil Kings	CAHL	Statistics Unavailable
1961–62	Sudbury Wolves	EPHL	59	12	10	22	22	5	3	1	4	2
1962–63	Syracuse/St. Louis Braves	EPHL	32	20	20	40	42	––	––	––	––	––
1962–63	Edmonton Flyers	WHL	15	3	8	11	8	––	––	––	––	––
1963–64	Indianapolis Capitols / Cincinnati Wings	CPHL	45	12	18	30	16	––	––	––	––	––
1964–65	Memphis Wings	CPHL	70	18	32	50	61	––	––	––	––	––
1965–66	Pittsburgh Hornets	AHL	61	0	8	8	12	––	––	––	––	––
1966–67	Buffalo Bisons	AHL	61	12	18	30	30	––	––	––	––	––
1967–68	Buffalo Bisons	AHL	71	29	33	62	65	5	4	3	7	2
1968–69	Buffalo Bisons	AHL	71	29	34	63	37	6	1	1	2	4
1969–70	Buffalo Bisons	AHL	72	29	31	60	48	14	7	3	10	8
1970–71	Salt Lake Golden Eagles	WHL	70	35	26	61	61	––	––	––	––	––
1971–72	Salt Lake Golden Eagles	WHL	72	22	20	42	39	––	––	––	––	––
1972–73	Alberta Oilers	WHA	50	6	7	13	14	1	0	1	1	0
1973–74	Winston–Salem Polar Twins	SHL	64	25	40	65	51	7	3	4	7	2
WHA totals			50	6	7	13	14	1	0	1	1	0
