= Ken Baird =

Canadian ice hockey player (1951–2016)

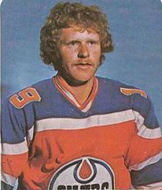
- Born: February 1, 1951 Flin Flon, Manitoba, Canada
- Died: December 18, 2016 (aged 65) Snow Lake, Manitoba, Canada
- Height: 6 ft 0 in (183 cm)
- Weight: 190 lb (86 kg; 13 st 8 lb)
- Position: Defence
- Shot: Left
- Played for: California Golden Seals; Edmonton Oilers; Calgary Cowboys; Winnipeg Jets
- NHL draft: 15th overall, 1971; California Golden Seals
- Playing career: 1971–1982

Kenneth Stewart Baird (February 1, 1951 – December 18, 2016) was a professional ice hockey player who played 332 games in the World Hockey Association and 10 games in the National Hockey League between 1971 and 1978. He played for the NHL's California Golden Seals, then spent six seasons in the WHA with the Edmonton Oilers, Winnipeg Jets and Calgary Cowboys. In 1978 Baird joined Duisburger SC in West Germany, and spent four seasons there before retiring in 1982. Baird later moved to Snow Lake, Manitoba, and died there in December 2016.

== Career statistics ==
=== Regular season and playoffs ===
			Regular season					Playoffs
Season	Team	League	GP	G	A	Pts	PIM	GP	G	A	Pts	PIM
1969–70	Estevan Bruins	WCHL	1	0	0	0	0	—	—	—	—	—
1969–70	Flin Flon Bombers	WCHL	47	2	5	7	126	17	2	8	10	60
1970–71	Flin Flon Bombers	WCHL	66	35	40	75	211	17	12	9	21	119
1971–72	California Golden Seals	NHL	10	0	2	2	15	—	—	—	—	—
1971–72	Oklahoma City Blazers	CHL	59	5	11	16	196	6	0	2	2	29
1972–73	Alberta Oilers	WHA	74	14	15	29	112	—	—	—	—	—
1973–74	Edmonton Oilers	WHA	68	17	19	36	115	5	1	1	2	7
1974–75	Edmonton Oilers	WHA	77	30	28	58	151	—	—	—	—	—
1975–76	Edmonton Oilers	WHA	48	13	24	37	87	4	3	1	4	16
1976–77	Edmonton Oilers	WHA	2	1	2	3	0	—	—	—	—	—
1976–77	Calgary Cowboys	WHA	7	0	0	0	2	—	—	—	—	—
1977–78	Edmonton Oilers	WHA	6	2	4	6	2	—	—	—	—	—
1977–78	Winnipeg Jets	WHA	49	14	7	21	29	7	0	4	4	7
1978–79	Duisburger SC	GER-2	28	7	7	14	22	—	—	—	—	—
1979–80	Duisburger SC	GER	47	32	28	60	141	—	—	—	—	—
1980–81	Duisburger SC	GER	39	31	40	71	108	7	5	3	8	4
1981–82	Duisburger SC	GER-2	48	69	66	135	115	—	—	—	—	—
WHA totals			332	91	99	190	498	16	4	6	10	30
NHL totals			10	0	2	2	15	—	—	—	—	—
