= Val Fonteyne =

Canadian ice hockey player (b. 1933)

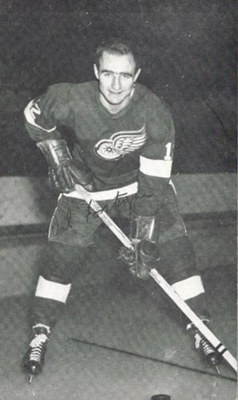
- Fonteyne in 1960s postcard
- Born: December 2, 1933 (age 92) Wetaskiwin, Alberta, Canada
- Height: 5 ft 10 in (178 cm)
- Weight: 160 lb (73 kg; 11 st 6 lb)
- Position: Left wing
- Shot: Left
- Played for: NHL; Pittsburgh Penguins; New York Rangers; Detroit Red Wings; WHA; Alberta/Edmonton Oilers
- Playing career: 1954–1974

Valere Ronald Fonteyne (born December 2, 1933) is a Canadian former professional ice hockey left winger. He played in the National Hockey League (NHL) from 1959 to 1972, serving the Detroit Red Wings (on two tours of duty), New York Rangers and Pittsburgh Penguins, and in the World Hockey Association (WHA) from 1972 to 1974 with the Alberta/Edmonton Oilers.

== Playing career ==
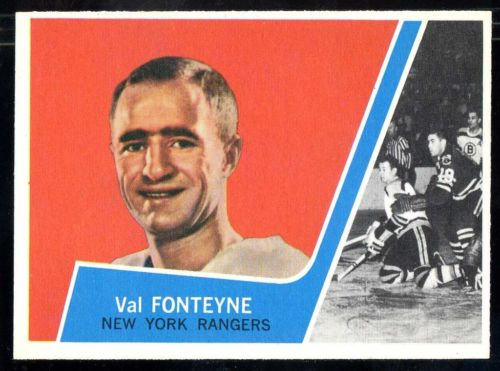
Fonteyne in 1963 Topps card

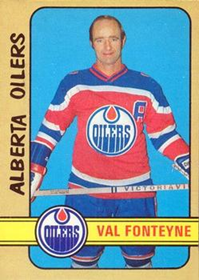
1972-73 OPC card of Fonteyne for Alberta Oilers

While not an offensive star, Fonteyne was a hard-working and effective defensive forward. He is regarded as one of the cleanest players in National Hockey League history. In 820 NHL games spanning 13 seasons, he served a remarkable total of just 26 minutes in the penalty box. He went completely unpenalized in five different seasons, including three in a row from 1965–1968. In a further 149 World Hockey Association games he was assessed only two minor penalties. In his entire professional career, Fonteyne only received a single fighting penalty.

In his NHL career, Fonteyne scored 75 goals and 154 assists for 229 points in 820 games. He also played in 59 playoff games, scoring 3 goals and 10 assists. He made it to the Stanley Cup finals with the Detroit Red Wings in 1961, 1963 and 1966 but lost each time.

The Alberta native was the first player chosen by the then-Alberta Oilers in the 1972 WHA General Player Draft; he played two seasons in the WHA before ending his career. He was one of 130 former Oilers to appear in a post-game ceremony when the Edmonton Oilers played their final game at Rexall Place in April 2016 before moving to a new arena.

== Career statistics ==
=== Regular season and playoffs ===
			Regular season					Playoffs
Season	Team	League	GP	G	A	Pts	PIM	GP	G	A	Pts	PIM
1951–52	Medicine Hat Tigers	WCHL	41	9	9	18	5	—	—	—	—	—
1952–53	Medicine Hat Tigers	WCHL	31	7	14	21	4	4	4	2	6	0
1953–54	Medicine Hat Tigers	WCHL	36	14	14	28	18	10	1	5	6	12
1954–55	New Westminster Royals	WHL	7	0	1	1	0	—	—	—	—	—
1954–55	Kelowna Packers	OSHL	41	9	10	19	2	4	0	0	0	0
1955–56	Seattle Americans	WHL	70	18	18	36	0	—	—	—	—	—
1956–57	Seattle Americans	WHL	70	24	40	64	6	6	5	1	6	2
1957–58	Seattle Americans	WHL	70	34	41	75	11	9	4	4	8	0
1958–59	Seattle Totems	WHL	64	32	49	81	2	12	6	5	11	0
1959–60	Detroit Red Wings	NHL	69	4	7	11	2	6	0	4	4	0
1960–61	Detroit Red Wings	NHL	66	6	11	17	4	11	2	3	5	0
1961–62	Detroit Red Wings	NHL	70	5	5	10	4	—	—	—	—	—
1962–63	Detroit Red Wings	NHL	67	6	14	20	2	11	0	0	0	2
1963–64	New York Rangers	NHL	69	7	18	25	4	—	—	—	—	—
1964–65	Baltimore Clippers	AHL	9	2	3	5	2	—	—	—	—	—
1964–65	New York Rangers	NHL	27	0	1	1	2	—	—	—	—	—
1964–65	Detroit Red Wings	NHL	16	2	5	7	4	5	0	1	1	0
1965–66	Detroit Red Wings	NHL	59	5	10	15	0	12	1	0	1	4
1965–66	Pittsburgh Hornets	AHL	12	5	7	12	6	—	—	—	—	—
1966–67	Detroit Red Wings	NHL	28	1	1	2	0	—	—	—	—	—
1966–67	Pittsburgh Hornets	AHL	17	5	11	16	0	9	3	5	8	4
1967–68	Pittsburgh Penguins	NHL	69	6	28	34	0	—	—	—	—	—
1968–69	Pittsburgh Penguins	NHL	74	12	17	29	2	—	—	—	—	—
1969–70	Pittsburgh Penguins	NHL	68	11	15	26	2	10	0	2	2	0
1970–71	Pittsburgh Penguins	NHL	70	4	9	13	0	—	—	—	—	—
1971–72	Pittsburgh Penguins	NHL	68	6	13	19	0	4	0	0	0	2
1972–73	Alberta Oilers	WHA	77	7	32	39	2	1	0	0	0	0
1973–74	Edmonton Oilers	WHA	72	9	13	22	2	5	1	0	1	0
WHA totals			149	16	45	61	4	6	1	0	1	0
NHL totals			820	75	145	229	26	59	3	10	13	8
