= Ed Patenaude =

Canadian ice hockey player (1949–2021)

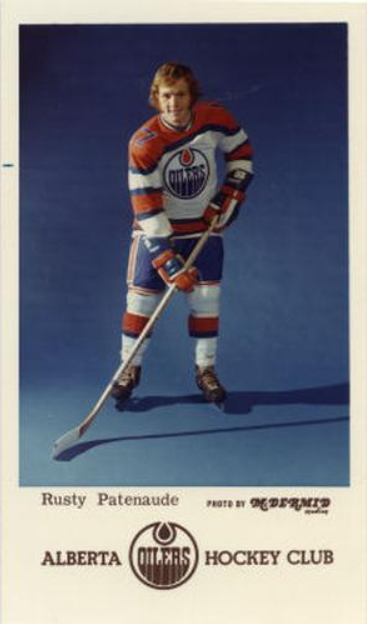
- Patenaude in 1972 card for Alberta (later Edmonton) Oilers
- Born: October 17, 1949 Williams Lake, British Columbia, Canada
- Died: July 24, 2021 (aged 71)
- Height: 5 ft 8 in (173 cm)
- Weight: 175 lb (79 kg; 12 st 7 lb)
- Position: Right wing
- Shot: Right
- Played for: Edmonton Oilers; Indianapolis Racers
- NHL draft: 50th overall, 1969; Pittsburgh Penguins
- Playing career: 1970–1978

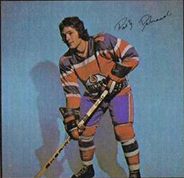
Pastenaude in card

Edgar Arnold "Rusty" Patenaude (October 17, 1949 – July 24, 2021) was a professional ice hockey player who played 431 games in the World Hockey Association. He played with the Edmonton Oilers and Indianapolis Racers.

== Career statistics ==
=== Regular season and playoffs ===
			Regular season					Playoffs
Season	Team	League	GP	G	A	Pts	PIM	GP	G	A	Pts	PIM
1966–67	Moose Jaw Canucks	CMJHL	55	11	13	24	0	—	—	—	—	—
1967–68	Moose Jaw Canucks	WCJHL	59	46	31	77	103	—	—	—	—	—
1968–69	Calgary Centennials	WCHL	53	21	41	62	74
1969–70	Baltimore Clippers	AHL	1	0	0	0	0	—	—	—	—	—
1969–70	Calgary Centennials	WCHL	51	37	36	73	72	—	—	—	—	—
1970–71	Amarillo Wranglers	CHL	72	13	24	37	39	—	—	—	—	—
1971–72	Fort Wayne Komets	IHL	70	35	41	76	109	8	3	2	5	8
1972–73	Alberta Oilers	WHA	78	29	27	56	59	1	0	1	1	4
1973–74	Edmonton Oilers	WHA	71	20	23	43	55	4	0	2	2	2
1974–75	Edmonton Oilers	WHA	56	20	16	36	38	—	—	—	—	—
1975–76	Edmonton Oilers	WHA	77	42	30	72	88	4	1	4	5	12
1976–77	Edmonton Oilers	WHA	73	25	16	41	57	2	0	0	0	8
1977–78	Indianapolis Racers	WHA	76	23	19	42	71	—	—	—	—	—
WHA totals			431	159	131	290	368	11	1	7	8	26
