= Kerry Ketter =

Canadian ice hockey player (born 1947)

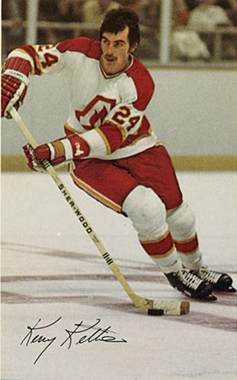
- Born: September 20, 1947 (age 78) Prince George, British Columbia, Canada
- Height: 6 ft 1 in (185 cm)
- Weight: 202 lb (92 kg; 14 st 6 lb)
- Position: Defence
- Shot: Left
- Played for: Atlanta Flames; Edmonton Oilers
- Playing career: 1966–1976

Kerry Kenneth Ketter (born September 20, 1947) is a Canadian former ice hockey player. He played a single season each with the Atlanta Flames in the National Hockey League, and the Edmonton Oilers in the World Hockey Association.

Ketter was one of the first players chosen by the Atlanta Flames in the 1972 NHL Expansion Draft.

== Regular season and playoffs ==
			Regular season					Playoffs
Season	Team	League	GP	G	A	Pts	PIM	GP	G	A	Pts	PIM
1965–66	Edmonton Oil Kings	ASHL	50	3	5	8	14	11	1	4	5	18
1965–66	Edmonton Oil Kings	M-Cup	—	—	—	—	—	12	1	2	3	13
1966–67	Edmonton Oil Kings	CMJHL	56	4	26	30	99	9	1	4	5	22
1967–68	Edmonton Oil Kings	WCHL	59	11	28	39	169	13	1	5	6	26
1967–68	Edmonton Nuggets	ASHL	1	0	1	1	0	3	0	1	1	12
1967–68	Estevan Bruins	M-Cup	—	—	—	—	—	5	0	0	0	12
1968–69	Fort Worth Wings	CHL	62	2	10	12	80	—	—	—	—	—
1969–70	Fort Worth Wings	CHL	61	4	8	12	79	7	0	0	0	7
1970–71	Baltimore Clippers	AHL	71	2	20	22	102	6	2	1	3	10
1971–72	Nova Scotia Voyageurs	AHL	69	2	8	10	108	15	2	5	7	50
1972–73	Atlanta Flames	NHL	41	0	2	2	58	—	—	—	—	—
1973–74	Dallas Black Hawks	CHL	65	5	20	25	84	5	0	0	0	4
1974–75	Baltimore Clippers	AHL	44	1	7	8	44	—	—	—	—	—
1974–75	Omaha Knights	CHL	31	2	11	13	36	5	0	4	4	2
1975–76	Edmonton Oilers	WHA	48	1	9	10	20	—	—	—	—	—
WHA totals			48	1	9	10	20	—	—	—	—	—
NHL totals			41	0	2	2	58	—	—	—	—	—
