= Doug Barrie =

Canadian ice hockey player (born 1946)

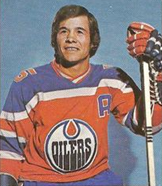
- Born: October 2, 1946 (age 79) Edmonton, Alberta, Canada
- Height: 5 ft 9 in (175 cm)
- Weight: 175 lb (79 kg; 12 st 7 lb)
- Position: Defence
- Shot: Right
- Played for: Pittsburgh Penguins; Buffalo Sabres; Los Angeles Kings; Alberta/Edmonton Oilers
- Playing career: 1966–1977

Douglas Robert Barrie (born October 2, 1946) is a Canadian former ice hockey defenceman. He played in the National Hockey League for the Pittsburgh Penguins, Buffalo Sabres, and Los Angeles Kings between 1969 and 1972. He also played in the World Hockey Association for the Alberta/Edmonton Oilers between 1972 and 1977.

He was traded from the Detroit Red Wings to the Toronto Maple Leafs for the contractual rights to Carl Brewer on March 4, 1968. He finished the remainder of the 1967–68 season with the Tulsa Oilers.

In his NHL career, Barrie played in 158 games, scoring 10 goals and adding 42 assists. He played in 350 WHA games, scoring 37 goals and adding 122 assists.

== Career statistics ==
=== Regular season and playoffs ===
			Regular season					Playoffs
Season	Team	League	GP	G	A	Pts	PIM	GP	G	A	Pts	PIM
1965–66	Edmonton Oil Kings	ASHL	40	2	7	9	80	11	1	4	5	31
1965–66	Edmonton Oil Kings	M-Cup	—	—	—	—	—	19	3	3	6	66
1966–67	Memphis Wings	CHL	11	1	5	6	14	—	—	—	—	—
1966–67	Pittsburgh Hornets	AHL	27	0	2	2	6	—	—	—	—	—
1967–68	Kansas City Blues	CHL	32	0	6	6	76	—	—	—	—	—
1967–68	Omaha Knights	CHL	23	1	6	7	74	—	—	—	—	—
1967–68	Tulsa Oilers	CHL	8	0	2	2	21	11	1	5	6	55
1968–69	Pittsburgh Penguins	NHL	8	1	1	2	8	—	—	—	—	—
1968–69	Amarillo Wranglers	CHL	66	7	29	36	163	—	—	—	—	—
1969–70	Baltimore Clippers	AHL	70	5	9	14	139	5	2	6	8	10
1970–71	Buffalo Sabres	NHL	75	4	23	27	168	—	—	—	—	—
1971–72	Buffalo Sabres	NHL	27	2	5	7	45	—	—	—	—	—
1971–72	Los Angeles Kings	NHL	48	3	13	16	47	—	—	—	—	—
1972–73	Alberta Oilers	WHA	54	9	22	31	111	1	0	0	0	22
1973–74	Edmonton Oilers	WHA	69	4	27	31	214	4	1	0	1	16
1974–75	Edmonton Oilers	WHA	78	12	33	45	122	—	—	—	—	—
1975–76	Edmonton Oilers	WHA	79	4	21	25	81	4	0	1	1	15
1976–77	Edmonton Oilers	WHA	70	8	19	27	92	4	0	0	0	0
WHA totals			350	37	122	159	620	13	1	1	2	53
NHL totals			158	10	42	52	268	—	—	—	—	—
