= Roger Côté =

Canadian ice hockey player (1939–2020)

- Born: December 22, 1939 Belleterre, Quebec, Canada
- Died: July 16, 2020 (aged 80)
- Height: 5 ft 9 in (175 cm)
- Weight: 184 lb (83 kg; 13 st 2 lb)
- Position: Defence
- Shot: Left
- Played for: Edmonton Oilers; Indianapolis Racers
- Playing career: 1957–1975

Regent "Roger" Côté (December 22, 1939 – July 16, 2020) was a Canadian professional ice hockey defenceman who played 155 games in the World Hockey Association for the Edmonton Oilers and Indianapolis Racers. Over a 19-year career, Côté played the majority of his seasons with teams in the semi-professional (QHL) or minor professional leagues (AHL, WHL, EPHL, SHL).

He died on July 16, 2020.

== Career statistics ==
=== Regular season and playoffs ===
			Regular season					Playoffs
Season	Team	League	GP	G	A	Pts	PIM	GP	G	A	Pts	PIM
1957–58	Toronto Marlboros	OHA	52	2	7	9	0	––	––	––	––	––
1958–59	Chicoutimi Sagueneens	QHL	4	0	0	0	2	––	––	––	––	––
1958–59	Toronto Marlboros	OHA	50	5	10	15	0	––	––	––	––	––
1959–60	Rochester Americans	AHL	5	0	0	0	12	––	––	––	––	––
1959–60	Toronto Marlboros	OHA	46	3	14	17	0	––	––	––	––	––
1959–60	Sudbury Wolves	EPHL	––	––	––	––	––	1	0	0	0	2
1960–61	Rochester Americans	AHL	71	5	9	14	224	––	––	––	––	––
1961–62	Rochester Americans	AHL	51	0	16	16	113	2	0	0	0	4
1962–63	Springfield Indians	AHL	60	10	15	25	115	––	––	––	––	––
1963–64	Springfield Indians	AHL	47	13	9	22	75	––	––	––	––	––
1964–65	Springfield Indians	AHL	71	13	18	31	117	––	––	––	––	––
1965–66	Drummondville Rockets	QPHL	Statistics Unavailable
1965–66	Springfield Indians	AHL	69	17	16	33	92	6	1	3	4	2
1966–67	Drummondville Eagles	QPHL	Statistics Unavailable
1966–67	San Diego Gulls	WHL	17	2	7	9	14	––	––	––	––	––
1966–67	Springfield Indians	AHL	29	9	11	20	46	––	––	––	––	––
1967–68	Springfield Kings	AHL	69	2	15	17	137	4	0	0	0	6
1968–69	Phoenix Roadrunners	WHL	67	5	16	21	44	––	––	––	––	––
1969–70	Springfield–Buffalo	AHL	56	6	10	16	54	4	0	1	1	8
1970–71	Springfield Kings	AHL	58	4	13	17	126	––	––	––	––	––
1970–71	Cleveland Barons	AHL	9	4	3	7	10	8	3	1	4	16
1971–72	Cleveland Barons	AHL	73	4	21	25	141	3	0	0	0	0
1972–73	Alberta Oilers	WHA	60	3	5	8	46	1	0	0	0	0
1973–74	Edmonton Oilers	WHA	59	0	3	3	34	2	0	0	0	0
1973–74	Winston–Salem Polar Twins	SHL	7	0	1	1	10	––	––	––	––	––
1974–75	Indianapolis Racers	WHA	36	0	6	6	24	––	––	––	––	––
WHA totals			155	3	14	17	104	3	0	0	0	0
