= Bob McAneeley =

Canadian ice hockey player (born 1950)

- Born: November 7, 1950 (age 75) Cranbrook, British Columbia, Canada
- Height: 5 ft 8 in (173 cm)
- Weight: 175 lb (79 kg; 12 st 7 lb)
- Position: Left wing
- Shot: Left
- Played for: Edmonton Oilers
- Playing career: 1966–1976

Robert William McAneeley (born November 7, 1950) is a former World Hockey Association player. He played 174 games for the Edmonton Oilers. He is the twin brother of NHL and WHA player Ted McAneeley and the two were teammates with the Oilers in the 1975–76 season.

== Career statistics ==
=== Regular season and playoffs ===
			Regular season					Playoffs
Season	Team	League	GP	G	A	Pts	PIM	GP	G	A	Pts	PIM
1966–67	Calgary Buffaloes	CMJHL	52	21	11	32	0	—	—	—	—	—
1967–68	Calgary–Edmonton	WCJHL	50	41	26	67	114	—	—	—	—	—
1968–69	Edmonton Oil Kings	WCHL	56	38	19	57	168	—	—	—	—	—
1969–70	Edmonton Oil Kings	WCHL	Statistics Unavailable
1970–71	University of British Columbia	CIAU	––	30	22	52	24	—	—	—	—	—
1971–72	University of British Columbia	CIAU	Statistics Unavailable
1972–73	Alberta Oilers	WHA	51	5	7	12	24	—	—	—	—	—
1973–74	Edmonton Oilers	WHA	52	12	11	23	49	4	1	0	1	0
1973–74	Winston–Salem Polar Twins	SHL	39	24	34	58	36	—	—	—	—	—
1974–75	Salt Lake Golden Eagles	CHL	74	32	38	70	118	10	3	9	12	10
1975–76	Edmonton Oilers	WHA	71	12	16	28	60	3	1	0	1	0
WHA totals			174	29	34	63	133	7	2	0	2	0
