= Ross Perkins =

Canadian ice hockey player

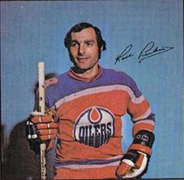
- Born: November 4, 1946 (age 79) Tisdale, Saskatchewan, Canada
- Height: 5 ft 10 in (178 cm)
- Weight: 176 lb (80 kg; 12 st 8 lb)
- Position: Centre
- Shot: Right
- Played for: Edmonton Oilers
- Playing career: 1966–1975

Ross Perkins (born November 4, 1946) is a Canadian retired professional ice hockey forward. He played 225 games in the World Hockey Association with the Edmonton Oilers.

== Career statistics ==
=== Regular season and playoffs ===
			Regular season					Playoffs
Season	Team	League	GP	G	A	Pts	PIM	GP	G	A	Pts	PIM
1965–66	Edmonton Oil Kings	ASHL	Statistics Unavailable
1966–67	Edmonton Oil Kings	CMJHL	56	32	39	71	0	—	—	—	—	—
1967–68	Fort Worth Wings	CPHL	19	4	5	9	0	13	4	3	7	28
1967–68	San Diego Gulls	WHL	54	15	21	36	21	—	—	—	—	—
1968–69	Fort Worth Wings	CHL	71	10	20	30	30	—	—	—	—	—
1968–69	San Diego Gulls	WHL	—	—	—	—	—	4	2	0	2	0
1969–70	San Diego Gulls	WHL	11	1	1	2	4	—	—	—	—	—
1970–71	Fort Worth Wings	CHL	72	23	17	40	60	4	1	3	4	0
1971–72	Fort Worth Wings	CHL	68	41	56	97	47	7	4	3	7	11
1972–73	Alberta Oilers	WHA	71	21	37	58	19	1	0	0	0	2
1973–74	Edmonton Oilers	WHA	78	16	40	56	43	5	1	3	4	2
1974–75	Edmonton Oilers	WHA	76	7	16	23	33	—	—	—	—	—
WHA totals			225	44	93	137	95	6	1	3	4	4

Preceded by Pierre Jarry	CHL Leading Scorer; 1971–72	Succeeded by Lyle Moffat and Dan Gruen (tied)
