= 1963 Memorial Cup =

Canadian junior ice hockey championship

The Memorial Cup trophy

The 1963 Memorial Cup final was the 45th junior ice hockey championship of the Canadian Amateur Hockey Association (CAHA). The George Richardson Memorial Trophy champions Niagara Falls Flyers of the Ontario Hockey Association in Eastern Canada competed against the Abbott Cup champions Edmonton Oil Kings of the Central Alberta Hockey League in Western Canada. In a best-of-seven series, held at Edmonton Gardens in Edmonton, Alberta. Edmonton won their 1st Memorial Cup, defeating Niagara Falls 4 games to 2.

CAHA vice-president Lionel Fleury oversaw the 1963 playoffs in Eastern Canada, when the junior champions from the Quebec Amateur Hockey Association and the Maritime Amateur Hockey Association declined to participate and complained that the national deadlines did not allow adequate time to decide their leagues' champions. When the CAHA was concerned about the quality of Memorial Cup competition due to the rapid expansion in junior ice hockey, Fleury was named chairman of a committee to investigate the imbalance the competition in Eastern Canada and find a solution to include all branches of the CAHA in the national playoffs. He opted to change the subsequent format of the playoffs from an elimination bracket into a round-robin format to reduce travel costs.

CAHA president Art Potter oversaw the 1963 Memorial Cup final series. Niagara Falls' coach Hap Emms made numerous petty complaints about the series and the CAHA, including the ice rink's dimensions and access to the other team's practices. Emms threatened that the Flyers would quit the 1963 Memorial Cup and accused Potter of being "strictly a homer" and dictatorial. Emms charged that his team was denied access to treatment for a player's broken leg, and that spectators and sportswriters in Edmonton treated his team poorly, and complained about a general lack of hospitality. Potter dismissed the charges and stated that the treatment of the Flyers matched their lack of courtesy and refusal to attend the Edmonton Sports Writers' Association dinner. The Canadian Press described the series as an "all-out war", the play of Edmonton to be "almost brutal", and that Edmonton seemed intent to end Eastern Canada's opinion that Western Canadian teams played "pantsy-waist hockey". The CAHA debated the incidents in the series and approved a motion to deplore "the actions of any club official which degrade our game". Potter agreed that Emms was a good coach but that "his actions were childlike".

== Scores ==
- Game 1: Niagara Falls 8-0 Edmonton
- Game 2: Edmonton 7-3 Niagara Falls
- Game 3: Edmonton 5-2 Niagara Falls
- Game 4: Edmonton 3-2 Niagara Falls
- Game 5: Niagara Falls 5-2 Edmonton
- Game 6: Edmonton 4-3 Niagara Falls

== Winning roster ==
Ron Anderson, Butch Barber, Tom Bend, Roger Bourbonnais, Jim Brown, Rich Bulloch, Jim Chase, Vince Downey, Jim Eagle, Ron Falkenberg, Doug Fox, Harold Fleming, Russ Kirk, S. Knox, Bert Marshall, Max Mestinsek, Butch Paul, Gregg Pilling, Pat Quinn, Dave Rochefort, Glen Sather, Reg Tashuk. Coach: Buster Brayshaw
