= Edmonton Oil Kings (WCHL) =

Canadian junior ice hockey team

- City: Edmonton, Alberta, Canada
- League: Western Hockey League
- Operated: 1950–1979
- Home arena: Edmonton Gardens, Jasper Place Arena
- Colours: Red, Blue, White

Franchise history
- 1967–1978: Flin Flon Bombers
- 1978–1979: Edmonton Oil Kings
- 1979–1980: Great Falls Americans
- 1980–1982: Spokane Flyers

Previous franchise history
- 1950–1976: Edmonton Oil Kings
- 1976–present: Portland Winterhawks

Championships
- Playoff championships: 1963 & 1966 Memorial Cup Champions

The Edmonton Oil Kings were a Canadian junior ice hockey team, and founding member of the Western Hockey League. They played at Edmonton Gardens in Edmonton, Alberta, and later Northlands Coliseum. In 1976, they moved to Portland, Oregon to become the Portland Winter Hawks. A second incarnation of the team played only one season in 1977–78 before moving to Great Falls, Montana.

== Foundation of the Oil Kings ==
The Alberta Amateur Hockey Association (AAHA) sought to combine the best players from the Edmonton Junior Hockey League into a Western Canada Junior Hockey League (WCJHL) team. Leo LeClerc became the general manager in 1949, and led the team to its first Memorial Cup win in 1963. An Edmonton team was formed for the 1950–51 season, but was denied entry since the WCJHL had already made its schedule. In response, the AAHA threatened not to sanction the other four Alberta-based teams in the league, but recanted and sought exhibition games for the Edmonton team. When players from Edmonton were added to the rosters of WCJHL teams, AAHA vice-president Art Potter stated that the players had not been released and faced suspension for not honouring commitments. After the players returned, Potter announced the team would be known as the Edmonton Oil Kings and play an exhibition schedule versus WCJHL teams.

== Franchise history ==
The Edmonton Oil Kings were finalists in the 1954 Memorial Cup losing to the St. Catharines Teepees in five games; in the 1960 Memorial Cup losing to St. Catharines in six games; and were finalists in the 1962 Memorial Cup losing to the Hamilton Red Wings in five games. The Oil Kings won the Memorial Cup in 1963 and 1966 as members of the senior men's Central Alberta Hockey League. The team was required to defeat the Alberta Junior Hockey League champion to earn the right to play for the national junior championship. They were also cup finalists seven different years between 1954 and 1971.

In 1966, Bill Hunter, the team's General Manager, was concerned about the state of junior hockey in western Canada. Each of the west's four provinces all had their own junior league, and Hunter felt that this put them at a disadvantage when competing nationally against the powerful leagues in Ontario and Quebec. Hunter hoped to form a unified western league to compete.

Hunter's hopes became reality in the summer of 1966, when a revolt within the Saskatchewan Junior Hockey League caused several of its top clubs, the Estevan Bruins, Regina Pats, Saskatoon Blades, Moose Jaw Canucks and Weyburn Red Wings, to leave the league and join Hunter's Oil Kings in forming a new league. A seventh franchise was also added in Calgary, the Calgary Buffaloes.

The Oil Kings captured back to back President's Cup titles in 1971 and 1972, however it would prove to be the final titles in the celebrated franchise's history, as the Oil Kings found it difficult to compete with the lure of pro hockey provided by the WHA's Edmonton Oilers. The Oil Kings moved to Portland, Oregon in 1976, to become the Portland Winter Hawks.

There was a second Edmonton Oil Kings hockey team in the WHL that played only one season. The Flin Flon Bombers moved to Edmonton for the 1978–79 WHL season, but only survived one year and moved on to Great Falls. The team folded as the Great Falls Americans, then was revived as the Spokane Flyers for two seasons before folding for good.

A new WHL team began play in Edmonton in 2007–08, reviving the Oil Kings name.

=== League membership ===
The Oil Kings played in the following leagues during its existence:

- 1951–56: Western Canada Junior Hockey League
- 1956–66: Central Alberta Hockey League
- 1966–76: Western Canada Hockey League
- 1978–79: Western Hockey League

== Season-by-season record ==
Note: GP = Games played, W = Wins, L = Losses, T = Ties Pts = Points, GF = Goals for, GA = Goals against

=== Western Canada Junior Hockey League (1951–56) ===
Season	GP	W	L	T	Pts	GF	GA	Finish	League Playoffs	Memorial Cup
1951–52	44	29	14	1	59	-	-	2nd	Lost final	
1952–53	36	28	6	2	58	218	97	1st	Lost final	
1953–54	36	33	3	0	55	263	84	1st	Won Championship	Lost Memorial Cup final
1954–55	40	23	16	1	47	173	115	3rd	Lost semi-final	
1955–56	36	17	19	0	34	150	143	3rd	Lost semi-final	

=== Central Alberta Hockey League (1956–66) ===
Season	GP	W	L	T	Pts	GF	GA	Finish	League Playoffs	Memorial Cup
1956–57	40	24	16	0	48	-	-	2nd	Lost semi-final	Lost Western semi-final
1957–58	40	20	19	1	41	161	164	3rd	Lost semi-final	Lost Western semi-final
1958–59	40	13	26	1	27	-	-	4th	Lost semi-final	Lost Western semi-final
1959–60	30	12	18	0	24	157	171	4th	Lost final	Lost Memorial Cup final
1960–61	30	12	18	0	24	-	-	4th	out of playoffs	Lost Memorial Cup final
1961–62	34	14	17	3	31	-	-	5th	out of playoffs	Lost Memorial Cup final
1962–63	34	21	12	1	43	-	-	1st	Lost final	Memorial Cup Champion
1963–64	40	31	8	1	63	-	-	1st	Lost semi-final	Lost Memorial Cup final
1964–65	-	-	-	-	-	-	-	-	out of playoffs	Lost Memorial Cup final
1965–66	-	-	-	-	-	-	-	-	Co-Champion	Memorial Cup Champion

During this period the Oil Kings were a junior team playing their regular season in the senior-aged Central Alberta Hockey League. During the 1963–64 season, the Oil Kings also played an interlocking schedule of 14 games total against the seven teams in the original Saskatchewan Junior Hockey League. The results for the 1964–65 and 1965–66 CAHL regular seasons are unavailable.

=== Western Canada Hockey League (1966–77) ===
Season	GP	W	L	T	Pts	GF	GA	Finish	League Playoffs	Memorial Cup
1966–67	56	34	12	10	78	281	188	1st Overall	Lost semi-final	
1967–68	60	38	16	6	82	303	194	3rd Overall	Lost semi-final	
1968–69	60	33	25	2	68	229	206	1st West	Lost final	
1969–70	60	35	25	0	70	254	217	2nd West	Lost final	
1970–71	66	45	20	1	91	346	258	1st West	Won Championship	Lost Cup final
1971–72	68	44	22	2	90	320	246	2nd West	Won Championship	Lost Cup round robin
1972–73	68	40	20	8	88	311	240	1st West	Lost semi-final	
1973–74	68	25	36	7	57	252	301	4th West	Lost quarter-final	
1974–75	70	34	29	7	75	340	321	5th West	Out of playoffs	
1975–76	72	25	42	5	55	312	400	5th West	Lost preliminary round	

=== Western Hockey League (1978–79) ===
Season	GP	W	L	T	Pts	GF	GA	Finish	League Playoffs	Memorial Cup
1978–79	72	17	43	12	46	288	403	3rd East	Eliminated in round robin	

== NHL alumni ==
- Ron Anderson
- Wayne Babych
- Garnet Bailey
- Jeff Bandura
- Dave Barr
- Doug Barrie
- Norm Beaudin
- Larry Bignell
- Tom Bladon
- Gregg Boddy
- Johnny Bucyk
- Craig Cameron
- Bryan Campbell
- Tony Currie
- John Davidson
- Ed Diachuk
- Marc Dufour
- Bob Falkenberg
- Harrison Gray
- Larry Hale
- Al Hamilton
- Ray Hannigan
- Jim Harrison
- Galen Head
- Rich Healey
- Bryan Hextall
- Ted Hodgson
- Chuck Holmes
- Dave Hoyda
- Fran Huck
- Frank Hughes
- Dave Inkpen
- Ron Jones
- Eddie Joyal
- Kerry Ketter
- Don Kozak
- Dave Kryskow
- Doug Lecuyer
- Craig Levie
- Ross Lonsberry
- Len Lunde
- Bruce MacGregor
- Bert Marshall
- Ted McAneeley
- Dunc McCallum
- Don McLeod
- Billy McNeill
- Gerry Melnyk
- Paul Messier
- Larry Mickey
- Wayne Muloin
- Paul Mulvey
- Bob Murdoch
- Hap Myers
- Ray Neufeld
- Brian Ogilvie
- Dan Olesevich
- Butch Paul
- Cliff Pennington
- Brent Peterson
- Pat Quinn
- Dave Richardson
- Gary Rissling
- Dave Rochefort
- John Rogers
- Darcy Rota
- Tom Roulston
- Phil Russell
- Glen Sather
- Jim Shires
- Gary Simmons
- Harold Snepsts
- Doug Soetaert
- Roy Sommer
- Frank Spring
- Wayne Stephenson
- Gord Strate
- Bobby Taylor
- Norm Ullman
- Bob Whitlock
- Randy Wyrozub
- Ed Zeniuk

Hockey Hall of Fame

- Bryan Hextall (player, 1969 induction)
- Johnny Bucyk (player, 1981 induction)
- Norm Ullman (player, 1982 induction)
- Glen Sather (builder, 1997 induction)

NHL 1st round draft picks

- 1969 NHL Amateur Draft - Frank Spring #4 Overall (Boston Bruins)
- 1971 NHL Amateur Draft - Ron Jones #6 Overall (Boston Bruins)
- 1971 NHL Amateur Draft - Dan Spring #12 Overall (Chicago Black Hawks)
- 1972 NHL Amateur Draft - Phil Russell #13 Overall (Chicago Black Hawks)
- 1973 NHL Amateur Draft - Darcy Rota #13 Overall (Chicago Black Hawks)
- 1975 NHL Amateur Draft - Robin Sadler #9 Overall (Montreal Canadiens)

== See also ==
- List of ice hockey teams in Alberta
