= Central Alberta Hockey League =

Canadian senior ice hockey league (1956–1966)

The Central Alberta Hockey League (CAHL) is a defunct senior amateur hockey league that operated in Alberta, Canada from 1956 to 1966.

The creation of the CAHL coincided with the folding of the original Western Canada Junior Hockey League (WCJHL). The junior-aged Edmonton Oil Kings became inaugural members of the senior-aged CAHL. The Oil Kings were the strongest junior team in all of Western Canada over this period, advancing to the Western junior championship Doyle Cup in all 10 CAHL seasons, moving on to the Canadian junior championship Memorial Cup in seven consecutive seasons, winning the 1963 and 1966 Memorial Cups.

Teams who played in the CAHL included:

- Calgary Buffaloes
- Drumheller Miners
- Edmonton Oil Kings
- Lacombe Rockets
- Olds Elks
- Ponoka Stampeders
- Red Deer Indians
- Red Deer Rustlers
