= List of Edmonton Oilers (WHA) players =

This is a complete list of players for the Edmonton Oilers of the World Hockey Association (WHA). It includes players that have played at least one regular season or playoff game for the Edmonton Oilers (or the Alberta Oilers, as they were known in their inaugural season) as a franchise in the World Hockey Association between 1972 and 1979.

A total of 130 skaters and 14 goalies played for the Oilers in the seven seasons between 1972–73 and 1978–79. Of those, 16 also played for the Oilers after they joined the National Hockey League for the 1979–80 NHL season.

Only one player, defenceman Al Hamilton, played with the Oilers for their entire seven seasons in the WHA; Hamilton leads all WHA Oilers with 455 games played in the regular season, and holds the team record for 27 playoff games played (he also scored the most regular season points, with 311). The goaltender with the longest career as a WHA Oiler is Dave Dryden, having played four seasons with the club; Dryden leads all goaltenders with 197 regular season games played, and holds the team record for 18 playoff games played (he also registered the most regular season wins, with 94). There are five skaters and one goaltender who only played a single game as an Oiler during these years, and one player who never played a regular season game (participated in two playoff games).

Four ex-Oilers from the WHA era were later elected into the Hockey Hall of Fame: Jacques Plante (1978), Norm Ullman (1982), and Wayne Gretzky (1999) as players, and Glen Sather (1997) in the builder category.

== Key ==
Also played with the Oilers in the NHL, or WHA award winner with the Oilers, or elected to the Hockey Hall of Fame. Details are provided in the Notes column.

All players
Nat	Nationality
(Canada)	Canada
(Czechoslovakia)	Czechoslovakia
(Finland)	Finland
(Sweden)	Sweden
(United Kingdom)	United Kingdom
(United States)	United States

Goaltenders
GP	Games Played
W	Wins
L	Losses
T	Ties
SO	Shutouts
GAA	Goals against average
SV%	Save percentage

Skaters
GP	Games Played	Pos	Position
G	Goals	C	Centre
A	Assists	LW	Left Wing
P	Points	RW	Right Wing
PIM	Penalty minutes	D	Defenceman

== Goaltenders ==
Name	Nat	Seasons	Regular Season							Playoffs						Notes
Name	Nat	Seasons	GP	W	L	T	SO	GAA	SV%	GP	W	L	SO	GAA	SV%	Notes
Broderick, Ken	(Canada)	1976–1978	49	20	23	1	4	3.77	.865	3	1	2	0	3.40	n/a	
Brown, Ken	(Canada)	1972–1973; 1974–1975	52	21	19	0	3	3.58	.892	—	—	—	—	—	—	
Doyle, Gary	(Canada)	1973–1974	1	1	0	0	0	4.00	.895	—	—	—	—	—	—	
Dryden, Dave	(Canada)	1975–1979	197	94	87	9	7	3.42	.883	18	6	11	0	3.95	n/a	Gordie Howe Trophy 1979; Ben Hatskin Trophy 1979; NHL Oilers 1979–1980
Kamppuri, Hannu	(Finland)	1978–1979	2	0	1	0	0	6.67	.792	—	—	—	—	—	—	
Levasseur, Louis	(Canada)	1976–1977	21	6	12	3	0	4.35	.866	2	0	2	0	4.50	n/a	
McLeod, Don	(Canada)	1977–1978	33	15	10	1	2	3.55	.864	4	1	3	1	4.64	n/a	
Mio, Eddie	(Canada)	1978–1979	22	7	10	0	1	3.99	.853	3	0	0	0	4.00	n/a	NHL Oilers 1979–1981
Norris, Jack	(Canada)	1972–1974	117	51	53	4	3	3.13	.901	3	0	2	0	4.86	n/a	
Plante, Jacques	(Canada)	1974–1975	40	15	14	1	1	3.32	.890	—	—	—	—	—	—	
Turnbull, Frank	(Canada)	1975–1976; 1977–1978	4	0	2	0	0	5.42	.831	—	—	—	—	—	—	
Walsh, Ed	(United States)	1978–1979	22	7	10	0	0	3.75	.836	—	—	—	—	—	—	
Wilkie, Ian	(Canada)	1973–1974	5	3	1	1	0	2.11	.930	1	0	1	0	5.85	n/a	
Worthy, Chris	(Canada)	1973–1976	81	27	39	4	3	3.97	.885	4	1	2	0	4.37	n/a	

== Skaters ==
Name	Nat	Pos	Seasons	Regular Season					Playoffs					Notes
Name	Nat	Pos	Seasons	GP	G	A	P	PIM	GP	G	A	P	PIM	Notes
Ahrens, Chris	(Canada)	D	1977–1978	4	0	0	0	15	—	—	—	—	—	
Alexander, Claire	(Canada)	D	1978–1979	54	8	23	31	16	—	—	—	—	—	
Anderson, Ron	(Canada)	RW	1972–1974	92	19	17	36	49	2	0	0	0	0	
Antonovich, Mike	(Canada)	C	1976–1977	7	1	1	2	0	—	—	—	—	—	
Arndt, Danny	(Canada)	LW	1976–1977	1	0	0	0	0	—	—	—	—	—	
Bailey, "Ace"	(Canada)	LW	1978–1979	38	5	4	9	22	2	0	0	0	4	
Baird, Ken	(Canada)	D	1972–1978	276	77	92	169	467	10	5	2	7	29	
Barrie, Doug	(Canada)	D	1972–1977	350	37	122	159	620	13	1	1	2	53	
Beaton, Frank	(Canada)	LW	1976–1977	68	4	9	13	274	5	0	2	2	21	
Benzelock, Jim	(Canada)	RW	1972–1973	26	1	1	2	10	—	—	—	—	—	
Berry, Doug	(Canada)	C	1978–1979	29	6	3	9	4	—	—	—	—	—	
Blanchette, Bernie	(Canada)	RW	1972–1973	23	5	4	9	2	—	—	—	—	—	
Boddy, Gregg	(Canada)	D	1976–1977	46	1	17	18	41	4	1	2	3	14	
Buchanan, Ron	(Canada)	C	1974–1975	22	6	9	15	4	—	—	—	—	—	
Busniuk, Ron	(Canada)	C	1976–1978	88	4	20	24	240	10	0	2	2	55	
Butters, Bill	(United States)	D	1976–1977	7	0	2	2	17	—	—	—	—	—	
Callighen, Brett	(Canada)	LW	1976–1979	180	60	85	145	239	23	9	13	22	38	NHL Oilers 1979–1982
Campbell, Bryan	(Canada)	C	1976–1978	119	19	55	74	30	5	3	1	4	0	
Carleton, Wayne	(Canada)	C	1975–1976	26	5	16	21	6	4	1	1	2	2	
Carlin, Brian	(Canada)	LW	1972–1974	70	13	22	35	6	1	0	0	0	0	
Carlson, Jack	(United States)	LW	1975–1976	10	1	1	2	31	4	0	0	0	4	
Carlson, Steve	(United States)	C	1978–1979	73	18	22	40	50	11	1	1	2	12	
Carlyle, Steve	(Canada)	D	1972–1976	218	11	59	70	109	6	0	1	1	4	
Chipperfield, Ron	(Canada)	C	1977–1979	135	65	89	154	95	18	10	11	21	8	NHL Oilers 1979–1980
Climie, Ron	(Canada)	LW	1973–1975	125	53	63	116	37	5	0	0	0	0	
Colborne, Howie	(Canada)	LW	1973–1974	2	0	0	0	0	—	—	—	—	—	
Connelly, Wayne	(Canada)	RW	1976–1977	38	13	15	28	18	5	0	1	1	0	
Cote, Roger	(Canada)	D	1972–1974	119	3	8	11	80	3	0	0	0	0	
Cross, Jim	(Canada)	D	1977–1978	2	0	0	0	0	—	—	—	—	—	
Cunningham, Gary	(Canada)	D	1973–1974	2	0	0	0	0	—	—	—	—	—	
Deadmarsh, Butch	(Canada)	LW	1977–1978	20	1	3	4	32	—	—	—	—	—	
DeMarco, Ab	(Canada)	D	1977–1978	47	6	8	14	20	1	0	0	0	0	
Driscoll, Peter	(Canada)	LW	1978–1979	69	17	23	40	115	13	1	6	7	8	NHL Oilers 1979–1981
Evo, Bill	(United States)	LW	1975–1976	8	0	4	4	0	—	—	—	—	—	
Falkenberg, Bob	(Canada)	D	1972–1974; 1977–1978	157	9	37	46	76	6	0	2	2	14	
Ferguson, Norm	(Canada)	C	1977–1978	71	26	21	47	2	5	0	0	0	0	
Fisher, John	(United Kingdom)	C	1972–1973	40	0	5	5	0	—	—	—	—	—	
Fitchner, Bob	(Canada)	C	1973–1974	31	1	2	3	21	—	—	—	—	—	
Flett, Bill	(Canada)	RW	1976–1979	195	103	84	187	68	15	5	4	9	4	NHL Oilers 1979–1980
Fonteyne, Val	(Canada)	LW	1972–1974	149	16	45	61	4	6	1	0	1	0	
Fortunato, Joe	(Canada)	LW	1976–1977	1	0	0	0	0	—	—	—	—	—	
George, Wes	(Canada)	LW	1978–1979	3	0	0	0	11	—	—	—	—	—	
Gilmore, Tom	(Canada)	RW	1973–1975	131	31	42	73	248	5	1	4	5	15	
Goldsworthy, Bill	(Canada)	RW	1978–1979	17	4	2	6	14	4	1	1	2	11	
Gretzky, Wayne	(Canada)	C	1978–1979	72	43	61	104	19	13	10	10	20	2	Lou Kaplan Trophy 1979; NHL Oilers 1979–1988; HHOF 1999 #99 retired 1999
Guite, Pierre	(Canada)	LW	1977–1979	72	13	22	35	79	5	1	1	2	20	
Gustafsson, Bengt	(Sweden)	RW	1978–1979	—	—	—	—	—	2	1	2	3	0	
Hall, Del	(Canada)	LW	1977–1978	1	0	0	0	0	—	—	—	—	—	
Hamilton, Al	(Canada)	D	1972–1979	455	53	258	311	492	27	5	11	16	31	NHL Oilers 1979–1980 #3 retired 1980
Harker, Derek	(Canada)	D	1972–1973	1	0	0	0	0	—	—	—	—	—	
Harrison, Jim	(Canada)	C	1972–1974	113	63	92	155	192	1	0	1	1	2	NHL Oilers 1979–1980
Herriman, Don	(Canada)	LW	1974–1975	33	1	2	3	21	—	—	—	—	—	
Hicke, Bill	(Canada)	RW	1972–1973	73	14	24	38	20	1	0	0	0	0	
Holland, Jerry	(Canada)	LW	1977–1978	22	2	1	3	14	—	—	—	—	—	
Hornung, Larry	(Canada)	D	1976–1977	21	2	1	3	0	—	—	—	—	—	
Hughes, John	(Canada)	D	1978–1979	41	2	15	17	82	13	1	0	1	35	NHL Oilers 1980–1981
Hunter, Dave	(Canada)	LW	1978–1979	72	7	25	32	134	13	2	3	5	42	NHL Oilers 1979–1988, 1988–1989
Hurley, Paul	(United States)	D	1975–1976	26	1	4	5	14	4	0	0	0	0	
Inkpen, Dave	(Canada)	D	1977–1978	19	0	1	1	16	—	—	—	—	—	
Jarry, Pierre	(Canada)	RW	1977–1978	18	4	10	14	4	5	1	0	1	4	
Joyal, Eddie	(Canada)	C	1972–1976	239	57	55	112	26	6	2	0	2	4	
Kassian, Dennis	(Canada)	LW	1972–1973	50	6	7	13	14	1	0	1	1	0	
Kennett, Murray	(Canada)	D	1974–1976	78	7	18	25	31	—	—	—	—	—	
Kerslake, Doug	(Canada)	RW	1974–1976	23	5	1	6	14	—	—	—	—	—	
Ketter, Kerry	(Canada)	D	1975–1976	48	1	9	10	20	—	—	—	—	—	
Kirk, Gavin	(United Kingdom)	C	1976–1977	52	8	28	36	16	5	1	0	1	4	
Krake, Skip	(Canada)	C	1975–1976	41	8	8	16	55	—	—	—	—	—	
Laframboise, Pete	(Canada)	LW	1976–1977	17	0	5	5	12	—	—	—	—	—	
Laing, Bill	(Canada)	C	1974–1976	96	10	16	26	99	4	0	1	1	4	
Langevin, Dave	(United States)	D	1976–1979	216	19	59	78	260	23	2	4	6	44	
Lloyd, Owen	(Canada)	D	1977–1978	3	0	1	1	4	—	—	—	—	—	
Long, Barry	(Canada)	D	1974–1977	158	30	73	103	184	4	0	0	0	4	
Lunde, Len	(Canada)	LW	1973–1974	72	26	22	48	8	5	0	1	1	0	
MacDonald, Blair	(Canada)	RW	1973–1976; 1977–1979	339	118	124	242	111	23	13	13	26	8	NHL Oilers 1979–1981
MacGregor, Bruce	(Canada)	C	1974–1976	135	37	38	75	23	4	0	1	1	0	
MacGregor, Gary	(Canada)	C	1977–1978	37	11	2	13	29	—	—	—	—	—	
Mayer, Jim	(Canada)	D	1978–1979	2	0	0	0	0	—	—	—	—	—	
McAneeley, Bob	(Canada)	LW	1972–1974; 1975–1976	174	29	34	63	133	7	2	0	2	0	
McAneeley, Ted	(Canada)	D	1975–1976	79	2	17	19	71	4	0	0	0	0	
McCrimmon, Jim	(Canada)	D	1973–1975	109	3	8	11	156	—	—	—	—	—	
McKay, Ray	(Canada)	D	1974–1975; 1977–1978	83	9	24	33	51	4	0	1	1	4	
McKenzie, Brian	(Canada)	C	1973–1974	78	18	20	38	66	5	0	1	1	0	
McMullin, Dale	(Canada)	LW	1977–1978	1	0	0	0	0	—	—	—	—	—	
Merrell, Barry	(Canada)	RW	1976–1977	10	1	3	4	0	—	—	—	—	—	
Micheletti, Joe	(United States)	D	1977–1979	128	28	67	95	141	18	0	11	11	6	
Miller, Warren	(United States)	RW	1977–1978	18	2	4	6	18	—	—	—	—	—	
Morris, Bill	(Canada)	C	1974–1975	36	4	8	12	6	—	—	—	—	—	
Morris, Peter	(Canada)	LW	1975–1977	78	7	13	20	36	3	0	1	1	7	
Morris, Rick	(Canada)	LW	1975–1978	117	30	33	63	135	9	0	2	2	10	
Muloin, Wayne	(Canada)	D	1975–1976	10	1	1	2	0	1	0	0	0	0	
Neilson, Jim	(Canada)	D	1978–1979	35	0	5	5	18	—	—	—	—	—	
Nevin, Bob	(Canada)	RW	1976–1977	13	3	2	5	0	—	—	—	—	—	
Patenaude, "Rusty"	(Canada)	RW	1972–1977	355	136	112	248	297	11	1	7	8	26	
Patrick, Glenn	(United States)	D	1976–1977	23	0	4	4	62	2	0	0	0	0	
Patterson, Dennis	(Canada)	D	1976–1977	23	0	2	2	2	—	—	—	—	—	
Peacosh, Gene	(Canada)	C	1976–1977	11	5	4	9	14	—	—	—	—	—	
Perkins, Ross	(Canada)	C	1972–1975	225	44	93	137	95	6	1	3	4	4	
Pinder, Gerry	(Canada)	RW	1977–1978	5	0	1	1	0	—	—	—	—	—	
Prentice, Bill	(Canada)	D	1976–1977	3	0	0	0	2	—	—	—	—	—	
Primeau, Kevin	(Canada)	RW	1977–1978	7	0	1	1	2	2	0	0	0	2	
Rogers, John	(Canada)	RW	1975–1976	44	9	8	17	34	—	—	—	—	—	
Rogers, Mike	(Canada)	C	1974–1976	122	47	63	110	12	—	—	—	—	—	Paul Deneau Trophy 1975; NHL Oilers 1985–1986
Rota, Randy	(Canada)	LW	1976–1978	93	17	28	45	20	10	4	3	7	4	
Russell, Bob	(Canada)	C	1975–1977	115	20	24	44	60	5	1	0	1	0	
Sandbeck, Cal	(United States)	D	1977–1979	17	1	2	3	41	5	0	0	0	10	
Sather, Glen	(Canada)	LW	1976–1977	81	19	34	53	77	5	1	1	2	2	
Scharf, Ted	(Canada)	RW	1976–1977	5	0	2	2	14	—	—	—	—	—	
Schraefel, Jim	(Canada)	C	1973–1974	34	1	1	2	0	5	0	3	3	0	
Semenko, Dave	(Canada)	LW	1977–1979	142	16	20	36	298	16	4	2	6	37	NHL Oilers 1979–1987
Sheehan, Bobby	(United States)	C	1973–1975	87	20	42	62	14	5	1	3	4	0	
Sheehy, Tim	(Canada)	RW	1974–1977	138	57	59	116	25	4	2	2	4	0	
Shmyr, Paul	(Canada)	D	1977–1979	160	17	79	96	219	18	2	8	10	34	
Siltanen, Risto	(Finland)	D	1978–1979	20	3	4	7	4	11	0	9	9	4	NHL Oilers 1979–1982
Simpson, Tom	(Canada)	RW	1976–1977	15	3	2	5	16	—	—	—	—	—	
Sobchuk, Dennis	(Canada)	C	1977–1979	87	32	40	72	35	17	7	6	13	8	
Spring, Dan	(Canada)	C	1975–1976	75	12	11	23	8	2	1	1	2	0	
St. Sauveur, Claude	(Canada)	C	1976–1977	15	5	7	12	2	5	1	0	1	0	
Stewart, Paul	(United States)	LW	1976–1977	2	0	0	0	2	—	—	—	—	—	
Tajcnar, Rudy	(Czechoslovakia)	D	1978–1979	2	0	0	0	0	—	—	—	—	—	
Topolnisky, Craig	(Canada)	D	1977–1978	10	0	2	2	4	—	—	—	—	—	
Troy, Jim	(United States)	RW	1977–1978	47	2	0	2	124	2	0	0	0	0	
Ullman, Norm	(Canada)	C	1975–1977	144	47	83	130	40	9	1	6	7	2	
Wall, Bob	(Canada)	D	1972–1974	152	22	60	82	66	6	0	3	3	2	
Walters, Ron	(Canada)	C	1972–1973	78	28	26	54	37	1	1	0	1	0	
Weir, Stan	(Canada)	C	1978–1979	68	31	30	61	20	13	2	5	7	2	NHL Oilers 1979–1982
Widing, Juha	(Sweden)	C	1977–1978	71	18	24	42	8	5	0	1	1	0	
Wilkins, Barry	(Canada)	D	1976–1977	51	4	24	28	75	4	0	1	1	2	
Williams, "Butch"	(United States)	RW	1976–1977	29	3	10	13	16	—	—	—	—	—	
Zuk, Wayne	(Canada)	C	1973–1974	2	0	0	0	0	—	—	—	—	—	
Zuke, Mike	(Canada)	C	1977–1978	71	23	34	57	47	5	2	3	5	0	
