= 1973–74 Edmonton Oilers season =

WHA hockey team season

1973–74 Edmonton Oilers
- Division: 3rd Western
- 1973–74 record: 38–37–3
- Home record: 24–14–1
- Road record: 14–23–2
- Goals for: 268
- Goals against: 269

Team information
- General manager: Bill Hunter
- Coach: Brian Shaw
- Captain: Al Hamilton
- Alternate captains: Doug Barrie; Val Fonteyne; Jim Harrison
- Arena: Edmonton Gardens
- Minor league affiliate: Winston-Salem Polar Twins (SHL)

Team leaders
- Goals: Ron Climie (38)
- Assists: Jim Harrison (45); Al Hamilton (45)
- Points: Ron Climie (74)
- Penalty minutes: Doug Barrie (214)
- Wins: Jack Norris (23)
- Goals against average: Jack Norris (3.21)

The 1973–74 Edmonton Oilers season was the second season of operation of the Edmonton Oilers in the World Hockey Association. The Oilers' qualified for the playoffs, losing in the first round to the Minnesota Fighting Saints.

== Regular season ==
=== Final standings ===
Western Division
	GP	W	L	T	GF	GA	PIM	Pts
Houston Aeros	78	48	25	5	318	219	1038	101
Minnesota Fighting Saints	78	44	32	2	332	275	1243	90
Edmonton Oilers	78	38	37	3	268	269	1273	79
Winnipeg Jets	78	34	39	5	264	296	673	73
Vancouver Blazers	78	27	50	1	278	345	1047	55
Los Angeles Sharks	78	25	53	0	239	339	1086	50

== Schedule and results ==
1973–74 regular season
October: 6–1–0 (home: 5–1–0; road: 1–0–0)

Game	Date	Visitor	Score	Home	OT	Decision	Attendance	Record	Pts	Recap
1	October 12	Winnipeg Jets	4 – 6	Edmonton Oilers		Norris	4,809	1–0–0	2	
2	October 14	Houston Aeros	2 – 5	Edmonton Oilers		Norris	5,200	2–0–0	4	
3	October 19	Vancouver Blazers	3 – 1	Edmonton Oilers		Norris	3,277	2–1–0	4	
4	October 21	Chicago Cougars	1 – 4	Edmonton Oilers		Norris	4,128	3–1–0	6	
5	October 23	Toronto Toros	2 – 4	Edmonton Oilers		Worthy	3,374	4–1–0	8	
6	October 27	Edmonton Oilers	6 – 2	Vancouver Blazers		Worthy	8,102	5–1–0	10	
7	October 28	Vancouver Blazers	5 – 7	Edmonton Oilers		Norris	3,650	6–1–0	12	

November: 9–5–0 (home: 5–1–0; road: 4–4–0)

Game	Date	Visitor	Score	Home	OT	Decision	Attendance	Record	Pts	Recap
8	November 2	Quebec Nordiques	4 – 5	Edmonton Oilers		Worthy	5,200	7–1–0	14	
9	November 4	Minnesota Fighting Saints	3 – 4	Edmonton Oilers		Norris	4,591	8–1–0	16	
10	November 6	New York Golden Blades	0 – 8	Edmonton Oilers		Norris	3,441	9–1–0	18	
11	November 8	Edmonton Oilers	4 – 3	Quebec Nordiques		Worthy	7,021	10–1–0	20	
12	November 10	Edmonton Oilers	6 – 3	New England Whalers		Norris	4,135	11–1–0	22	
13	November 11	Edmonton Oilers	4 – 2	Toronto Toros		Worthy	4,296	12–1–0	24	
14	November 13	Los Angeles Sharks	0 – 4	Edmonton Oilers		Norris	4,394	13–1–0	26	
15	November 16	Edmonton Oilers	1 – 3	Winnipeg Jets		Norris	7,952	13–2–0	26	
16	November 18	Minnesota Fighting Saints	5 – 2	Edmonton Oilers			4,780	13–3–0	26	
17	November 20	Cleveland Crusaders	3 – 5	Edmonton Oilers		Norris	3,960	14–3–0	28	
18	November 22	Edmonton Oilers	1 – 7	Vancouver Blazers		Worthy	8,573	14–4–0	28	
19	November 23	Edmonton Oilers	0 – 2	Los Angeles Sharks		Norris	6,876	14–5–0	28	
20	November 25	Edmonton Oilers	1 – 2	Houston Aeros		Norris	6,916	14–6–0	28	
21	November 29	Edmonton Oilers	3 – 2	New Jersey Knights		Norris	1,004	15–6–0	30	

December: 5–9–0 (home: 3–3–0; road: 2–6–0)

Game	Date	Visitor	Score	Home	OT	Decision	Attendance	Record	Pts	Recap
22	December 1	Edmonton Oilers	2 – 4	Cleveland Crusaders		Worthy	7,357	15–7–0	30	
23	December 2	Edmonton Oilers	0 – 3	Cleveland Crusaders		Norris	3,623	15–8–0	30	
24	December 4	Edmonton Oilers	2 – 0	Chicago Cougars		Worthy	3,097	16–8–0	32	
25	December 5	Edmonton Oilers	1 – 3	Winnipeg Jets		Norris	5,257	16–9–0	32	
26	December 6	Toronto Toros	3 – 4	Edmonton Oilers		Worthy	3,417	17–9–0	34	
27	December 12	Los Angeles Sharks	7 – 2	Edmonton Oilers			3,322	17–10–0	34	
28	December 14	Quebec Nordiques	4 – 3	Edmonton Oilers		Worthy	4,048	17–11–0	34	
29	December 16	Edmonton Oilers	7 – 6	New Jersey Knights		Worthy	814	18–11–0	36	
30	December 18	Edmonton Oilers	2 – 4	Quebec Nordiques		Worthy	6,344	18–12–0	36	
31	December 19	Edmonton Oilers	2 – 4	New England Whalers		Norris	5,433	18–13–0	36	
32	December 21	Vancouver Blazers	1 – 4	Edmonton Oilers		Norris	3,244	19–13–0	38	
33	December 22	Edmonton Oilers	3 – 6	Vancouver Blazers			8,611	19–14–0	38	
34	December 27	Minnesota Fighting Saints	5 – 4	Edmonton Oilers		Norris	5,200	19–15–0	38	
35	December 29	New England Whalers	2 – 6	Edmonton Oilers		Worthy	4,828	20–15–0	40	

January: 5–8–0 (home: 3–4–0; road: 2–4–0)

Game	Date	Visitor	Score	Home	OT	Decision	Attendance	Record	Pts	Recap
36	January 1	Winnipeg Jets	4 – 3	Edmonton Oilers	OT	Norris	5,200	20–16–0	40	
37	January 4	Edmonton Oilers	3 – 4	Los Angeles Sharks			4,087	20–17–0	40	
38	January 6	Edmonton Oilers	6 – 4	Minnesota Fighting Saints		Norris	4,430	21–17–0	42	
39	January 8	Edmonton Oilers	2 – 6	Houston Aeros			6,847	21–18–0	42	
40	January 9	Edmonton Oilers	6 – 4	Minnesota Fighting Saints		Norris	3,924	22–18–0	44	
41	January 11	Edmonton Oilers	4 – 7	Winnipeg Jets		Worthy	6,566	22–19–0	44	
42	January 13	Edmonton Oilers	2 – 6	Vancouver Blazers		Norris	9,309	22–20–0	44	
43	January 15	Minnesota Fighting Saints	1 – 4	Edmonton Oilers		Norris	3,949	23–20–0	46	
44	January 18	New Jersey Knights	4 – 7	Edmonton Oilers		Doyle	3,757	24–20–0	48	
45	January 20	Cleveland Crusaders	2 – 5	Edmonton Oilers		Norris	4,609	25–20–0	50	
46	January 22	New Jersey Knights	6 – 2	Edmonton Oilers		Worthy	3,330	25–21–0	50	
47	January 25	Winnipeg Jets	4 – 3	Edmonton Oilers		Norris	5,200	25–22–0	50	
48	January 27	Houston Aeros	4 – 1	Edmonton Oilers		Norris	5,200	25–23–0	50	

February: 5–7–0 (home: 4–3–0; road: 1–4–0)

Game	Date	Visitor	Score	Home	OT	Decision	Attendance	Record	Pts	Recap
49	February 1	Chicago Cougars	2 – 3	Edmonton Oilers		Norris	3,756	26–23–0	52	
50	February 3	Los Angeles Sharks	2 – 5	Edmonton Oilers		Norris	4,071	27–23–0	54	
51	February 5	Edmonton Oilers	0 – 8	Vancouver Blazers		Norris	9,637	27–24–0	54	
52	February 8	Houston Aeros	6 – 2	Edmonton Oilers		Norris	5,200	27–25–0	54	
53	February 10	Quebec Nordiques	4 – 3	Edmonton Oilers		Worthy	4,866	27–26–0	54	
54	February 12	Edmonton Oilers	2 – 3	Chicago Cougars		Worthy	4,129	27–27–0	54	
55	February 13	Edmonton Oilers	4 – 7	Minnesota Fighting Saints		Norris	4,637	27–28–0	54	
56	February 15	New England Whalers	7 – 3	Edmonton Oilers			4,056	27–29–0	54	
57	February 17	Toronto Toros	2 – 3	Edmonton Oilers	OT	Norris	4,215	28–29–0	56	
58	February 20	Winnipeg Jets	1 – 4	Edmonton Oilers		Norris	5,200	29–29–0	58	
59	February 23	Edmonton Oilers	2 – 5	Houston Aeros		Worthy	9,188	29–30–0	58	
60	February 24	Edmonton Oilers	5 – 3	Los Angeles Sharks		Norris	4,512	30–30–0	60	

March: 7–6–3 (home: 4–2–1; road: 3–4–2)

Game	Date	Visitor	Score	Home	OT	Decision	Attendance	Record	Pts	Recap
61	March 1	Houston Aeros	2 – 5	Edmonton Oilers		Norris	5,200	31–30–0	62	
62	March 3	Cleveland Crusaders	3 – 3	Edmonton Oilers	OT	Norris	4,503	31–30–1	63	
63	March 6	Edmonton Oilers	4 – 2	Houston Aeros		Norris	5,739	32–30–1	65	
64	March 8	Edmonton Oilers	1 – 4	Los Angeles Sharks		Norris	6,296	32–31–1	65	
65	March 10	Vancouver Blazers	2 – 1	Edmonton Oilers	OT	Norris	4,469	32–32–1	65	
66	March 12	Los Angeles Sharks	1 – 8	Edmonton Oilers		Worthy	3,530	33–32–1	67	
67	March 15	New England Whalers	6 – 2	Edmonton Oilers		Norris	5,046	33–33–1	67	
68	March 17	Vancouver Blazers	2 – 3	Edmonton Oilers		Worthy	4,546	34–33–1	69	
69	March 20	Edmonton Oilers	2 – 2	New England Whalers	OT	Wilkie	5,355	34–33–2	70	
70	March 21	Edmonton Oilers	5 – 5	Quebec Nordiques	OT	Worthy	6,211	34–33–3	71	
71	March 23	Edmonton Oilers	1 – 3	Cleveland Crusaders		Norris	7,784	34–34–3	71	
72	March 25	Edmonton Oilers	4 – 1	New Jersey Knights		Wilkie	1,936	35–34–3	73	
73	March 26	Edmonton Oilers	2 – 4	Chicago Cougars		Norris	5,168	35–35–3	73	
74	March 28	Edmonton Oilers	5 – 6	Toronto Toros	OT	Norris	5,555	35–36–3	73	
75	March 29	Edmonton Oilers	3 – 1	Minnesota Fighting Saints		Wilkie	11,459	36–36–3	75	
76	March 31	Chicago Cougars	1 – 4	Edmonton Oilers		Norris	5,200	37–36–3	77	

April: 1–1–0 (home: 0–0–0; road: 1–1–0)

Game	Date	Visitor	Score	Home	OT	Decision	Attendance	Record	Pts	Recap
77	April 2	Edmonton Oilers	2 – 3	Toronto Toros		Wilkie	4,025	37–37–3	77	
78	April 3	Edmonton Oilers	6 – 5	Winnipeg Jets	OT	Wilkie	5,339	38–37–3	79	

Legend: Win (2 points) Loss (0 points) Tie (1 point)

== Playoffs ==
1974 Avco Cup playoffs
Western Division Semifinals vs. (W2) Minnesota Fighting Saints – Fighting Saints win 4–1

Game	Date	Visitor	Score	Home	OT	Decision	Attendance	Series	Recap
1	April 6	Edmonton Oilers	1 – 2	Minnesota Fighting Saints		Norris	13,004	0–1	
2	April 7	Edmonton Oilers	5 – 8	Minnesota Fighting Saints		Norris	11,756	0–2	
3	April 10	Minnesota Fighting Saints	6 – 2	Edmonton Oilers		Wilkie	4,606	0–3	
4	April 12	Minnesota Fighting Saints	1 – 2	Edmonton Oilers		Worthy	5,200	1–3	
5	April 14	Edmonton Oilers	4 – 5	Minnesota Fighting Saints		Worthy	10,764	1–4	

Legend: Win Loss

== Player statistics ==
Regular season
Scoring

Player	Pos	GP	G	A	Pts	PIM	+/-	PPG	SHG	GWG
Ron Climie	LW	76	38	36	74	22	0	9	0	7
Jim Harrison	C	47	24	45	69	99	0	3	2	7
Al Hamilton	D	78	14	45	59	104	0	6	0	2
Ross Perkins	C	78	16	40	56	43	0	0	0	3
Len Lunde	C	72	26	22	48	8	0	7	2	4
Blair MacDonald	RW	78	21	24	45	34	0	5	0	3
Rusty Patenaude	RW	71	20	23	43	55	0	2	0	2
Tom Gilmore	LW	57	19	23	42	164	0	2	0	2
Brian McKenzie	LW	78	18	20	38	66	0	0	0	1
Bob Wall	D	74	6	31	37	46	0	2	1	0
Ken Baird	D	68	17	19	36	115	0	2	0	1
Doug Barrie	D	69	4	27	31	214	0	0	0	2
Bob McAneeley	LW	52	12	11	23	49	0	0	0	0
Val Fonteyne	LW	72	9	13	22	2	0	0	4	0
Eddie Joyal	C	45	8	10	18	2	0	0	0	1
Bob Falkenberg	D	78	3	14	17	32	0	0	0	0
Steve Carlyle	D	50	2	13	15	18	0	0	0	1
Ron Anderson	RW	19	5	2	7	6	0	0	0	1
Jim McCrimmon	D	75	2	3	5	106	0	0	0	1
Bobby Sheehan	C	10	1	3	4	6	0	1	0	0
Bob Fitchner	C	31	1	2	3	21	0	0	0	0
Roger Cote	D	59	0	3	3	34	0	0	0	0
Jack Norris	G	53	0	3	3	0	0	0	0	0
Jim Schraefel	C	34	1	1	2	0	0	0	0	0
Brian Carlin	LW	5	1	0	1	0	0	0	0	0
Howie Colborne	LW	2	0	0	0	0	0	0	0	0
Gary Cunningham	D	2	0	0	0	0	0	0	0	0
Gary Doyle	G	1	0	0	0	0	0	0	0	0
Ian Wilkie	G	5	0	0	0	0	0	0	0	0
Chris Worthy	G	29	0	0	0	13	0	0	0	0
Wayne Zuk	C	2	0	0	0	0	0	0	0	0

Goaltending

Player	MIN	GP	W	L	T	GA	GAA	SO
Jack Norris	2954	53	23	24	1	158	3.21	2
Chris Worthy	1452	29	11	12	1	92	3.80	1
Ian Wilkie	256	5	3	1	1	9	2.11	0
Gary Doyle	60	1	1	0	0	4	4.00	0
Team:	4722	78	38	37	3	263	3.34	3

Playoffs
Scoring

Player	Pos	GP	G	A	Pts	PIM	PPG	SHG	GWG
Blair MacDonald	RW	5	4	2	6	2	0	0	0
Tom Gilmore	LW	5	1	4	5	15	0	0	0
Ross Perkins	C	5	1	3	4	2	0	0	0
Bobby Sheehan	C	5	1	3	4	0	0	0	0
Jim Schraefel	C	5	0	3	3	0	0	0	0
Eddie Joyal	C	5	2	0	2	4	0	0	1
Ken Baird	D	5	1	1	2	7	0	0	0
Al Hamilton	D	4	1	1	2	15	0	0	0
Bob Falkenberg	D	5	0	2	2	14	0	0	0
Rusty Patenaude	RW	4	0	2	2	2	0	0	0
Bob Wall	D	5	0	2	2	2	0	0	0
Doug Barrie	D	4	1	0	1	16	0	0	0
Val Fonteyne	LW	5	1	0	1	0	0	0	0
Bob McAneeley	LW	4	1	0	1	0	0	0	0
Steve Carlyle	D	5	0	1	1	4	0	0	0
Len Lunde	C	5	0	1	1	0	0	0	0
Brian McKenzie	LW	5	0	1	1	0	0	0	0
Ron Anderson	RW	1	0	0	0	0	0	0	0
Ron Climie	LW	5	0	0	0	0	0	0	0
Roger Cote	D	2	0	0	0	0	0	0	0
Jack Norris	G	3	0	0	0	0	0	0	0
Ian Wilkie	G	1	0	0	0	0	0	0	0
Chris Worthy	G	3	0	0	0	0	0	0	0

Goaltending

Player	MIN	GP	W	L	GA	GAA	SO
Chris Worthy	146	3	1	1	8	3.29	0
Jack Norris	111	3	0	2	9	4.86	0
Ian Wilkie	41	1	0	1	4	5.85	0
Team:	298	5	1	4	21	4.23	0

Note: Pos = Position; GP = Games played; G = Goals; A = Assists; Pts = Points; +/- = plus/minus; PIM = Penalty minutes; PPG = Power-play goals; SHG = Short-handed goals; GWG = Game-winning goals
MIN = Minutes played; W = Wins; L = Losses; T = Ties; GA = Goals-against; GAA = Goals-against average; SO = Shutouts;

== Awards and records ==
Regular Season
Player	Milestone	Reached
Jim Harrison	2nd WHA Hat-trick	October 12, 1973
Len Lunde	1st WHA Game	October 12, 1973
Jim McCrimmon	1st WHA Game	October 12, 1973
Brian McKenzie	1st WHA Game	October 12, 1973
Blair MacDonald	1st WHA Game; 1st WHA Goal	October 12, 1973
Bob Fitchner	1st WHA Goal; 1st WHA Point	October 21, 1973
Blair MacDonald	1st WHA Assist; 1st WHA Point	October 21, 1973
Tom Gilmore	200th WHA PIM	October 23, 1973
Brian McKenzie	1st WHA Assist; 1st WHA Point	October 23, 1973
Chris Worthy	1st WHA Game; 1st WHA Win	October 23, 1973
Len Lunde	1st WHA Assist; 1st WHA Point	October 27, 1973
Brian McKenzie	1st WHA Goal	October 27, 1973
Tom Gilmore	??? WHA Gordie Howe hat trick	October 28, 1973
Jim Harrison	100th WHA Point	November 2, 1973
Jim Harrison	100th WHA PIM	November 4, 1973
Ron Climie	1st WHA Hat-trick; 1st WHA Natural Hat-trick; 1st Five-Goal WHA Game	November 6, 1973
Jim McCrimmon	1st WHA Assist; 1st WHA Point	November 6, 1973
Jim McCrimmon	1st WHA Goal	November 20, 1973
Al Hamilton	100th WHA Game	December 1, 1973
Bob Falkenberg	100th WHA Game	December 2, 1973
Len Lunde	1st WHA Goal	December 4, 1973
Chris Worthy	1st WHA Shutout	December 4, 1973
Ross Perkins	100th WHA Game	December 16, 1973
Doug Barrie	200th WHA PIM	December 18, 1973
Bob Fitchner	1st WHA Assist	December 29, 1973
Tom Gilmore	300th WHA PIM	December 29, 1973
Ross Perkins	100th WHA Point	January 6, 1974
Gary Doyle	1st WHA Game; 1st WHA Win	January 18, 1974
Al Hamilton	200th WHA PIM	January 20, 1974
Jack Norris	100th WHA Game	February 3, 1974
Doug Barrie	300th WHA PIM	February 8, 1974
Al Hamilton	100th WHA Point	February 12, 1974
Jim Schraefel	1st WHA Assist; 1st WHA Point	March 3, 1974
Ken Baird	200th WHA PIM	March 8, 1974
Ed Patenaude	100th WHA PIM	March 8, 1974
Jim McCrimmon	100th WHA PIM	March 12, 1974
Jim Schraefel	1st WHA Goal	March 12, 1974
Ron Climie	100th WHA Point	March 21, 1974
Tom Gilmore	1st WHA Hat-trick; 1st Four-Goal WHA Game	April 3, 1974
Ken Baird	100th WHA Game	TBA
Doug Barrie	100th WHA Game	TBA
Steve Carlyle	100th WHA Game	TBA
Ron Climie	100th WHA Game	TBA
Roger Cote	100th WHA Game	TBA
Val Fonteyne	100th WHA Game	TBA
Tom Gilmore	100th WHA Game	TBA
Jim Harrison	100th WHA Game	TBA
Eddie Joyal	100th WHA Game	TBA
Bob McAneeley	100th WHA Game	TBA
Ed Patenaude	100th WHA Game	TBA
Bob Wall	100th WHA Game	TBA
Howie Colborne	1st WHA Game	TBA
Gary Cunningham	1st WHA Game	TBA
Bob Fitchner	1st WHA Game	TBA
Jim Schraefel	1st WHA Game	TBA
Wayne Zuk	1st WHA Game	TBA

Playoffs
Player	Milestone	Reached
Bob Falkenberg	1st WHA Assist; 1st WHA Point	April 6, 1974
Len Lunde	1st WHA Game	April 6, 1974
Brian McKenzie	1st WHA Game	April 6, 1974
Jim Schraefel	1st WHA Game	April 6, 1974
Blair MacDonald	1st WHA Game; 1st WHA Goal; 1st WHA Point	April 6, 1974
Bobby Sheehan	1st WHA Game; 1st WHA Assist; 1st WHA Point	April 6, 1974
Al Hamilton	1st WHA Assist; 1st WHA Point	April 7, 1974
Len Lunde	1st WHA Assist; 1st WHA Point	April 7, 1974
Brian McKenzie	1st WHA Assist; 1st WHA Point	April 7, 1974
Ross Perkins	1st WHA Assist; 1st WHA Point	April 7, 1974
Jim Schraefel	1st WHA Assist; 1st WHA Point	April 7, 1974
Bob McAneeley	1st WHA Goal; 1st WHA Point	April 7, 1974
Bobby Sheehan	1st WHA Goal	April 7, 1974
Chris Worthy	1st WHA Game	April 7, 1974
Ken Baird	1st WHA Assist	April 10, 1974
Al Hamilton	1st WHA Goal	April 10, 1974
Ross Perkins	1st WHA Goal	April 10, 1974
Ian Wilkie	1st WHA Game	April 10, 1974
Val Fonteyne	1st WHA Goal; 1st WHA Point	April 12, 1974
Eddie Joyal	1st WHA Goal; 1st WHA Point	April 12, 1974
Blair MacDonald	1st WHA Assist	April 12, 1974
Chris Worthy	1st WHA Win	April 12, 1974
Doug Barrie	1st WHA Goal; 1st WHA Point	April 14, 1974
Steve Carlyle	1st WHA Assist; 1st WHA Point	TBD
Bob McAneeley	1st WHA Game	TBD

== Transactions ==
=== Trades ===
Date	To Edmonton Oilers	Traded to	Traded for
May 18, 1973	4th-round pick in 1973 - Bill Laing; 6th-round pick in 1973 - Dave Pay	Cincinnati Stingers	2nd-round pick in 1974 Secret - Brad Winton
May 18, 1973	Ron Climie; 3rd-round pick in 1973 - Blair MacDonald	Toronto Toros	Darryl Sittler; 3rd-round pick in 1976 - Paul Gardner
September 7, 1973	Tom Gilmore	Los Angeles Sharks	Ron Walters
September 14, 1973	Ian Wilkie	New York Raiders	Future considerations
November 5, 1973	Cash	Los Angeles Sharks	Ian Wilkie
February 25, 1974	second-round pick in 1974 Secret - Mike Rogers	Los Angeles Sharks	Don Saleski
March 15, 1974	Ian Wilkie	Los Angeles Sharks	Wayne Zuk
March 15, 1974	Bobby Sheehan	New York Jersey Knights	Bob Falkenberg

=== Players acquired ===
Date	Player	Former team
May 23, 1973	Bob Fitchner	Fort Wayne Komets (IHL)
September 1973	Gary Cunningham	New York Raiders
September 24, 1973	Gary Doyle	Ottawa Gee-Gees (OUAA)
January 1974	Jim Schraefel	San Diego Gulls (WHL)
February 1974	Howie Colborne	Calgary Dinos (CWUAA)

=== Players lost ===
Date	Player	New team
1973	John Fisher	Retired
April 29, 1974	Len Lunde	Retired

=== Signings ===
Date	Player	Term
June 5, 1973	Brian McKenzie	
June 13, 1973	Bill Laing	2-year
June 13, 1973	Jim McCrimmon	3-year
June 27, 1973	Blair MacDonald	3-year
August 30, 1973	Chris Worthy	2-year
August 30, 1973	Wayne Zuk	
September 14, 1973	Ron Climie	

== Draft picks ==
Edmonton's draft picks at the 1973 WHA Amateur Draft.

Round	#	Player	Nationality	College/Junior/Club team (League)
1	6	John Rogers (RW)	Canada	Edmonton Oil Kings (WCHL)
2	20	Jim McCrimmon (D)	Canada	Medicine Hat Tigers (WCHL)
3	30	Blair MacDonald (RW)	Canada	Cornwall Royals (QMJHL)
3	32	Dave Lewis (D)	Canada	Saskatoon Blades (WCHL)
4	39	Bill Laing (C)	Canada	Saskatoon Blades (WCHL)
4	45	Jim Moxey (F)	Canada	Hamilton Red Wings (OHA)
5	58	Ken Houston (D)	Canada	Chatham Maroons (SOJHL)
6	65	Dave Pay (C)	Canada	University of Wisconsin (WCHA)
6	71	Yvon Bouillon (F)	Canada	Cornwall Royals (QMJHL)
7	84	Dwayne Pentland (D)	Canada	Brandon Wheat Kings (WCHL)

== See also ==
- 1973–74 WHA season
