= 1970 NHL amateur draft =

1970 North American ice hockey draft

General information
- Date: June 11, 1970
- Location: Queen Elizabeth Hotel; Montreal, Quebec, Canada

Overview
- 115 total selections in 13 rounds
- First selection: (Canada) Gilbert Perreault (Buffalo Sabres)
- Hall of Famers: 3: C Gilbert Perreault; C Darryl Sittler; G Billy Smith

The 1970 NHL amateur draft was the eighth draft for the National Hockey League. It was held on June 11, 1970, the day after the 1970 expansion draft, at the Queen Elizabeth Hotel in Montreal.

The last active player in the NHL from this draft class was Billy Smith, who retired after the 1988–89 season.

== Selections by round ==
Below are listed the selections in the 1970 NHL amateur draft. Buffalo was given first choice by a spin of a roulette wheel.

= NHL All-Star team ·	= NHL All-Star (Note: Players are identified as an All-Star if they were selected for the All-Star game at any time in their career.) ·	= NHL All-Star and NHL All-Star team ·	= Hall of Famers

=== Round one ===
#	Player	Nationality	NHL team	College/junior/club team
1	Gilbert Perreault (C)	Canada	Buffalo Sabres	Montreal Junior Canadiens (OHA)
2	Dale Tallon (D)	Canada	Vancouver Canucks	Toronto Marlboros (OHA)
3	Reggie Leach (RW)	Canada	Boston Bruins (from Los Angeles)^{1}	Flin Flon Bombers (WCHL)
4	Rick MacLeish (LW)	Canada	Boston Bruins (from Philadelphia)^{2}	Peterborough Petes (OHA)
5	Ray Martynuik (G)	Canada	Montreal Canadiens (from California)^{3}	Flin Flon Bombers (WCHL)
6	Chuck Lefley (LW)	Canada	Montreal Canadiens (from Minnesota)^{4}	Canadian National Development Team
7	Greg Polis (LW)	Canada	Pittsburgh Penguins	Estevan Bruins (WCHL)
8	Darryl Sittler (C)	Canada	Toronto Maple Leafs	London Knights (OHA)
9	Ron Plumb (D)	Canada	Boston Bruins (from St. Louis)^{5}	Peterborough Petes (OHA)
10	Chris Oddleifson (C)	Canada	California Golden Seals (from Montreal)^{6}	Winnipeg Jets (WCHL)
11	Norm Gratton (RW)	Canada	New York Rangers	Montreal Junior Canadiens (OHA)
12	Serge Lajeunesse (D)	Canada	Detroit Red Wings	Montreal Junior Canadiens (OHA)
13	Bob Stewart (D)	Canada	Boston Bruins	Oshawa Generals (OHA)
14	Dan Maloney (LW)	Canada	Chicago Black Hawks	London Knights (OHA)

Notes

1. The Los Angeles Kings' first-round pick went to the Boston Bruins as the result of a trade on May 20, 1968, that sent Skip Krake to Los Angeles in exchange for this pick.
2. The Philadelphia Flyers' first-round pick went to the Boston Bruins as the result of a trade on October 18, 1967, that sent Rosaire Paiement to Philadelphia in exchange for this pick.
3. The California Golden Seals' first-round pick went to the Montreal Canadiens as the result of a trade on May 21, 1968, that sent Norm Ferguson, Stan Fuller, future considerations (Francois Lacombe and Michel Jacques) to California in exchange for Wally Boyer, Alain Caron, future considerations (Lyle Bradley), California's first-round pick in 1968 (Jim Pritchard) and this pick.
4. The Minnesota North Stars' first-round pick went to the Montreal Canadiens as the result of a trade on June 14, 1967, that sent the rights for Danny O'Shea to Minnesota in exchange for this pick.
5. The St. Louis Blues' first-round pick went to the Boston Bruins as the result of a trade on May 26, 1970, that sent Jim Lorentz to St. Louis in exchange for this pick.
6. The Montreal Canadiens' first-round pick went to the California Golden Seals as the result of a trade on May 22, 1970, that sent Francois Lacombe, a first-round pick in 1971 and cash to Montreal in exchange for Ernie Hicke and this pick.

=== Round two ===
#	Player	Nationality	NHL team	College/junior/club team
15	Butch Deadmarsh (LW)	Canada	Buffalo Sabres	Brandon Wheat Kings (WCHL)
16	Jim Hargreaves (D)	Canada	Vancouver Canucks	Winnipeg Jets (WCHL)
17	Buster Harvey (RW)	Canada	Minnesota North Stars (from Los Angeles via Montreal)^{1}	Hamilton Red Wings (OHA)
18	Bill Clement (C)	Canada	Philadelphia Flyers	Ottawa 67's (OHA)
19	Pete Laframboise (C)	Canada	California Golden Seals	Ottawa 67's (OHA)
20	Fred Barrett (D)	Canada	Minnesota North Stars	Toronto Marlboros (OHA)
21	John Stewart (LW)	Canada	Pittsburgh Penguins	Flin Flon Bombers (WCHL)
22	Errol Thompson (LW)	Canada	Toronto Maple Leafs	Charlottetown Royals (NBSHL)
23	Murray Keogan (C)	Canada	St. Louis Blues	University of Minnesota Duluth (NCAA)
24	Al McDonough (RW)	Canada	Los Angeles Kings (from Montreal)^{2}	St. Catharines Black Hawks (OHA)
25	Mike Murphy (RW)	Canada	New York Rangers	Toronto Marlboros (OHA)
26	Robert Guindon (LW)	Canada	Detroit Red Wings	Montreal Jr. Canadiens (OHA)
27	Dan Bouchard (G)	Canada	Boston Bruins	London Knights (OHA)
28	Michel Archambault (LW)	Canada	Chicago Black Hawks	Drummondville Rangers (QMJHL)

1. The Montreal Canadiens' second-round pick went to the Minnesota North Stars as the result of a trade on June 10, 1970, that sent Claude Larose to Montreal in exchange for Bobby Rousseau and this pick.
  Montreal previously acquired this pick as the result of a trade on November 17, 1969, that sent Montreal's second-round and third-round pick in 1970 in addition to the rights to Jean Potvin to Los Angeles in exchange for Los Angeles' third-round and fourth-round pick in 1970 along with this pick.
2. The Montreal Canadiens' second-round pick went to the Los Angeles Kings as the result of a trade on November 17, 1969, that sent Los Angeles' second-round, third-round pick and fourth-round pick in 1970 to Montreal in exchange for Montreal's third-round pick in 1970, the rights to Jean Potvin and this pick.

=== Round three ===
#	Player	Nationality	NHL team	College/junior/club team
29	Steve Cuddie (D)	Canada	Buffalo Sabres	Toronto Marlboros (OHA)
30	Ed Dyck (G)	Canada	Vancouver Canucks	Calgary Centennials (WCHL)
31	Steve Carlyle (D)	Canada	Montreal Canadiens (from Los Angeles)^{1}	Red Deer Rustlers (AJHL)
32	Bob Kelly (C)	Canada	Philadelphia Flyers	Oshawa Generals (OHA)
33	Randy Rota (C)	Canada	California Golden Seals	Calgary Centennials (WCHL)
34	Dennis Patterson (D)	Canada	Minnesota North Stars	Peterborough Petes (OHA)
35	Larry Bignell (D)	Canada	Pittsburgh Penguins	Edmonton Oil Kings (WCHL)
36	Gerry O'Flaherty (LW)	Canada	Toronto Maple Leafs	Kitchener Rangers (OHA)
37	Ron Climie (LW)	Canada	St. Louis Blues	Hamilton Red Wings (OHA)
38	Terry Holbrook (RW)	Canada	Los Angeles Kings (from Montreal)^{2}	London Knights (OHA)
39	Wendell Bennett (RW)	Canada	New York Rangers	Weyburn Red Wings (SJHL)
40	Yvon Lambert (LW)	Canada	Detroit Red Wings	Drummondville Rangers (QMJHL)
41	Ray Brownlee (LW)	Canada	Boston Bruins	University of Brandon (CIAU)
42	Len Frig (D)	Canada	Chicago Black Hawks	Calgary Centennials (WCHL)

1. The Los Angeles Kings' third-round pick went to the Montreal Canadiens as the result of a trade on November 17, 1969, that sent Montreal's second-round and third-round pick in 1970 in addition to the rights to Jean Potvin to Los Angeles in exchange for Los Angeles' second-round and fourth-round pick in 1970 along with this pick.
2. # The Montreal Canadiens' third-round pick went to the Los Angeles Kings as the result of a trade on November 17, 1969, that sent Los Angeles' second-round, third-round pick and fourth-round pick in 1970 to Montreal in exchange for Montreal's second-round pick in 1970, the rights to Jean Potvin and this pick.

=== Round four ===
#	Player	Nationality	NHL team	College/junior/club team
43	Randy Wyrozub (C)	Canada	Buffalo Sabres	Edmonton Oil Kings (WCHL)
44	Brent Taylor (RW)	Canada	Vancouver Canucks	Estevan Bruins (WCHL)
45	Cal Hammond (G)	Canada	Montreal Canadiens (from Los Angeles)^{1}	Flin Flon Bombers (WCHL)
46	Jacques Lapierre (D)	Canada	Philadelphia Flyers	Shawinigan Bruins (QMJHL)
47	Ted McAneeley (D)	Canada	California Golden Seals	Edmonton Oil Kings (WCHL)
48	Dave Cressman (LW)	Canada	Minnesota North Stars	Kitchener Rangers (OHA)
49	Connie Forey (LW)	Canada	Pittsburgh Penguins	Ottawa 67's(OHA)
50	Bob Gryp (LW)	Canada	Toronto Maple Leafs	Boston University (ECAC)
51	Gord Brooks (RW)	Canada	St. Louis Blues	London Knights (OHA)
52	John French (C)	Canada	Montreal Canadiens	Toronto Marlboros (OHA)
53	Andre St. Pierre (D)	Canada	New York Rangers	Drummondville Rangers (QMJHL)
54	Tom Johnston (RW)	Canada	Detroit Red Wings	Toronto Marlboros (OHA)
55	Gord Davies (LW)	Canada	Boston Bruins	Toronto Marlboros (OHA)
56	Walt Ledingham (C)	Canada	Chicago Black Hawks	University of Minnesota Duluth (WCHA)

1. The Los Angeles Kings' fourth-round pick went to the Montreal Canadiens as the result of a trade on November 17, 1969, that sent Montreal's second-round and third-round pick in 1970 in addition to the rights to Jean Potvin to Los Angeles in exchange for Los Angeles' second-round and third-round pick in 1970 along with this pick.

=== Round five ===
#	Player	Nationality	NHL team	College/junior/club team
57	Mike Morton (RW)	Canada	Buffalo Sabres	Shawinigan Bruins (QMJHL)
58	Bill McFadden (F)	Canada	Vancouver Canucks	Swift Current Broncos (WCHL)
59	Billy Smith (G)	Canada	Los Angeles Kings	Cornwall Royals (QMJHL)
60	Doug Kerslake (RW)	Canada	Philadelphia Flyers	Edmonton Oil Kings (WCHL)
61	Ray Gibbs (G)	Canada	California Golden Seals	Charlottetown Royals (NBSHL)
62	Hank Lehvonen (D)	Canada	Minnesota North Stars	Kitchener Rangers (OHA)
63	Steve Cardwell (LW)	Canada	Pittsburgh Penguins	Oshawa Generals (OHA)
64	Luc Simard (RW)	Canada	Toronto Maple Leafs	Trois-Rivières Draveurs (QMJHL)
65	Mike Stevens (D)	Canada	St. Louis Blues	University of Minnesota Duluth (WCHA)
66	Rick Wilson (D)	Canada	Montreal Canadiens	University of North Dakota (WCHA)
67	Gary Coalter (RW)	Canada	New York Rangers	Hamilton Red Wings (OHA)
68	Tom Mellor (D)	United States	Detroit Red Wings	Boston College (ECAC)
69	Bob Roselle (LW)	Canada	Boston Bruins	Sorel Eperviers (QMJHL)
70	Gilles Meloche (G)	Canada	Chicago Black Hawks	Verdun Maple Leafs (QMJHL)

=== Round six ===
#	Player	Nationality	NHL team	College/junior/club team
71	Mike Keeler (D)	Canada	Buffalo Sabres	Niagara Falls Flyers (OHA)
72	Dave Gilmour (LW)	Canada	Vancouver Canucks	London Knights (OHA)
73	Gerry Bradbury (C)	Canada	Los Angeles Kings	London Knights (OHA)
74	Dennis Giannini (LW)	Canada	Philadelphia Flyers	London Knights (OHA)
75	Doug Moyes (RW)	Canada	California Golden Seals	Sorel Eperviers (QMJHL)
76	Murray McNeil (LW)	Canada	Minnesota North Stars	Calgary Centennials (WCHL)
77	Bob Fitchner (C)	Canada	Pittsburgh Penguins	Brandon Wheat Kings (WCHL)
78	Cal Booth (LW)	Canada	Toronto Maple Leafs	Weyburn Red Wings (SJHL)
79	Claude Moreau (D)	Canada	St. Louis Blues	Montreal Jr. Canadiens (OHA)
80	Bob Brown (D)	Canada	Montreal Canadiens	Boston University (ECAC)
81	Duane Wylie (C)	Canada	New York Rangers	St. Catharines Black Hawks (OHA)
82	Bernie MacNeil (LW)	Canada	Detroit Red Wings	Espanola Eagles (NOJHL)
83	Murray Wing (D)	Canada	Boston Bruins	University of North Dakota (WCHA)

=== Round seven ===
#	Player	Nationality	NHL team	College/junior/club team
84	Tim Regan (G)	United States	Buffalo Sabres	Boston University (ECAC)
85	Jack Taggart (D)	Canada	St. Louis Blues (from Vancouver)^{1}	University of Denver (WCHA)
86	Brian Carlin (LW)	Canada	Los Angeles Kings	Calgary Centennials (WCHL)
87	Hank Nowak (LW)	Canada	Philadelphia Flyers	Oshawa Generals (OHA)
88	Terry Murray (D)	Canada	California Golden Seals	Ottawa 67's (OHA)
89	Gary Geldart (D)	Canada	Minnesota North Stars	London Knights (OHA)
90	Jim Pearson (D)	Canada	Pittsburgh Penguins	St. Catharines Black Hawks (OHA)
91	Paul Larose (RW)	Canada	Toronto Maple Leafs	Quebec Remparts (QMJHL)
92	Terry Marshall (D)	Canada	St. Louis Blues	Brandon Wheat Kings (WCHL)
93	Bob Fowler (RW)	United States	Montreal Canadiens	Estevan Bruins (WCHL)
94	Wayne Bell (G)	Canada	New York Rangers	Estevan Bruins (WCHL)
95	Ed Hays (C)	Canada	Detroit Red Wings	University of Denver (WCHA)
96	Glenn Siddall (LW)	Canada	Boston Bruins	Kitchener Rangers (OHA)

1. The Vancouver Canucks' seventh-round pick went to the St. Louis Blues as the result of a trade on June 10, 1970, that sent Andre Boudrias to Vancouver in exchange for Vancouver's ninth-round pick in 1970, cash and this pick.

=== Round eight ===
#	Player	Nationality	NHL team	College/junior/club team
97	Doug Rombough (C)	Canada	Buffalo Sabres	Saint Catharines Black Hawks (OHA)
98	Brian Chinnick (C)	Canada	Los Angeles Kings	Peterborough Petes (OHA)
99	Gary Cunningham (D)	Canada	Philadelphia Flyers	Saint Catharines Black Hawks (OHA)
100	Alan Henry (D)	Canada	California Golden Seals	University of North Dakota (WCHA)
101	Mickey Donaldson (LW)	Canada	Minnesota North Stars	Peterborough Petes (OHA)
102	Cam Newton (G)	Canada	Pittsburgh Penguins	Kitchener Rangers (OHA)
103	Ron Low (G)	Canada	Toronto Maple Leafs	Dauphin Kings (MJHL)
104	Dave Tataryn (G)	Canada	St. Louis Blues	Niagara Falls Flyers (OHA)
105	Ric Jordan (D)	Canada	Montreal Canadiens	Boston University (ECAC)
106	Pierre Brind'Amour (LW)	Canada	New York Rangers	Montreal Jr. Canadiens (OHA)

=== Round nine ===
#	Player	Nationality	NHL team	College/junior/club team
107	Luc Nadeau (C)	Canada	Buffalo Sabres	Drummondville Rangers (QMJHL)
108	Bob Winograd (D)	Canada	St. Louis Blues (from Vancouver)^{1}	Colorado College (WCHA)
109	Jean Daigle (LW)	Canada	Philadelphia Flyers	Sorel Eperviers (QMJHL)
110	Ron Lemieux (D)	Canada	Pittsburgh Penguins	Dauphin Kings (MJHL)
111	Mike Lampman (LW)	Canada	St. Louis Blues	University of Denver (WCHA)

1. The Vancouver Canucks' ninth-round pick went to the St. Louis Blues as the result of a trade on June 10, 1970, that sent Andre Boudrias to Vancouver in exchange for Vancouver's seventh-round pick in 1970 (Jack Taggart), cash and this pick.

=== Round ten ===
#	Player	Nationality	NHL team	College/junior/club team
112	Jeff Rotsch (D)	United States	St. Louis Blues	University of Wisconsin (WCHA)

=== Round eleven ===
#	Player	Nationality	NHL team	College/junior/club team
113	Al Calver (D)	Canada	St. Louis Blues	Kitchener Rangers (OHA)

=== Round twelve ===
#	Player	Nationality	NHL team	College/junior/club team
114	Jerry MacDonald (D)	Canada	St. Louis Blues	St. Francis Xavier University (CIAU)

=== Round thirteen ===
#	Player	Nationality	NHL team	College/junior/club team
115	Gerald Haines (F)	Canada	St. Louis Blues	Kenora Muskies (MJHL)

= NHL All-Star team ·	= NHL All-Star ·	= NHL All-Star and NHL All-Star team ·	= Hall of Famers

== Draftees based on nationality ==
Rank	Country	Number
1	Canada	111
2	United States	4

== See also ==
- 1970–71 NHL season
- 1970 NHL expansion draft
- List of NHL players
