= Barry Salovaara =

Canadian ice hockey player

- Born: January 7, 1948 (age 77); Toronto, Ontario, Canada
- Height: 5 ft 10 in (178 cm)
- Weight: 175 lb (79 kg; 12 st 7 lb)
- Position: Defenceman
- Shot: Right
- Played for: Detroit Red Wings; Klagenfurter AC; KOOVEE
- Playing career: 1968–1979

John "Barry" Salovaara (born January 7, 1948) is a Canadian retired professional ice hockey player who played 90 games in the National Hockey League for the Detroit Red Wings during the 1974–75 and 1975–76 seasons. The rest of his career, which lasted from 1968 to 1979, was mainly spent in the minor leagues.

Salovaara is of Finnish descent.

== Career statistics ==
=== Regular season and playoffs ===
			Regular season					Playoffs
Season	Team	League	GP	G	A	Pts	PIM	GP	G	A	Pts	PIM
1965–66	St. Catharines Black Hawks	OHA	47	3	13	16	67	7	0	2	2	8
1966–67	St. Catharines Black Hawks	OHA	48	7	18	25	99	6	1	1	2	4
1967–68	St. Catharines Black Hawks	OHA	38	6	20	26	96	—	—	—	—	—
1968–69	Greensboro Generals	EHL	57	6	15	21	106	8	0	1	1	19
1968–69	Dallas Black Hawks	CHL	4	0	1	1	8	—	—	—	—	—
1969–70	Greensboro Generals	EHL	74	11	35	46	141	16	1	13	14	45
1970–71	Greensboro Generals	EHL	72	15	53	68	95	9	0	7	7	29
1971–72	Fort Worth Wings	CHL	34	3	14	17	42	—	—	—	—	—
1971–72	Tidewater Wings	AHL	36	0	13	13	36	—	—	—	—	—
1972–73	Virginia Wings	AHL	76	4	26	30	92	13	3	1	4	16
1973–74	Baltimore Clippers	AHL	70	8	25	33	95	9	1	5	6	22
1974–75	Detroit Red Wings	NHL	27	0	2	2	18	—	—	—	—	—
1974–75	Virginia Wings	AHL	43	2	17	19	50	5	1	0	1	7
1975–76	Detroit Red Wings	NHL	63	2	11	13	52	—	—	—	—	—
1975–76	New Haven Nighthawks	AHL	6	1	3	4	14	—	—	—	—	—
1976–77	Klagenfurter AC	AUT	—	—	—	—	—	—	—	—	—	—
1977–78	Klagenfurter AC	AUT	—	—	—	—	—	—	—	—	—	—
1978–79	KOOVEE	FIN	35	7	7	14	51	—	—	—	—	—
AHL totals			231	15	84	99	287	27	5	6	11	45
NHL totals			90	2	13	15	70	—	—	—	—	—
