= Bill Klatt =

American ice hockey player (1947–2011)

- Born: October 16, 1947 Minneapolis, Minnesota, USA
- Died: December 23, 2011 (aged 64) Afton, Minnesota, USA
- Height: 5 ft 11 in (180 cm)
- Weight: 185 lb (84 kg; 13 st 3 lb)
- Position: Right wing
- Shot: Right
- Played for: Minnesota Fighting Saints
- National team: United States
- Playing career: 1969–1979

William Gerald Klatt (October 16, 1947 – December 23, 2011) was an American professional ice hockey player. He played 143 regular season games in the World Hockey Association for the Minnesota Fighting Saints between 1972 and 1974.

Klatt moved overseas to play in Austria following the 1974–75 season and also was a member of the United States national team at the 1976 Ice Hockey World Championship tournament in Katowice.

Klatt died on December 23, 2011, of leukemia aged 64.

== Career statistics ==
			Regular season					Playoffs
Season	Team	League	GP	G	A	Pts	PIM	GP	G	A	Pts	PIM
1966–67	University of Minnesota	NCAA	28	10	13	23	12	—	—	—	—	—
1967–68	University of Minnesota	NCAA	31	23	20	43	14	—	—	—	—	—
1968–69	University of Minnesota	NCAA	30	19	22	41	24	—	—	—	—	—
1968–69	Oklahoma City Blazers	CHL	4	1	1	2	0	—	—	—	—	—
1969–70	Oklahoma City Blazers	CHL	40	7	15	22	38	—	—	—	—	—
1970–71	Oklahoma City Blazers	CHL	71	34	41	75	37	5	1	0	1	4
1971–72	Oklahoma City Blazers	CHL	66	34	41	75	26	6	5	9	14	2
1972–73	Minnesota Fighting Saints	WHA	78	36	22	58	22	6	1	3	4	5
1973–74	Minnesota Fighting Saints	WHA	65	14	6	20	12	11	3	2	5	18
1974–75	Omaha Knights	CHL	60	20	25	45	24	4	1	1	2	4
1975–76	HC Salzburg	Austria	28	30	19	49	—	—	—	—	—	—
1976–77	ATSE Graz	Austria	32	46	23	69	74	—	—	—	—	—
1977–78	ATSE Graz	Austria	37	36	32	68	—	—	—	—	—	—
1978–79	ATSE Graz	Austria	30	32	20	52	—	—	—	—	—	—
WHA totals			143	50	28	78	34	17	4	5	9	23
CHL totals			241	96	123	219	125	15	7	10	17	10

== Awards and honors ==
Award	Year
All-WCHA Second team	1967–68
