= Duane Wylie =

American-born Canadian ice hockey player

- Born: November 10, 1950 (age 75) Spokane, Washington, U.S.
- Height: 5 ft 8 in (173 cm)
- Weight: 170 lb (77 kg; 12 st 2 lb)
- Position: Center
- Shot: Left
- Played for: Chicago Black Hawks
- NHL draft: 81st overall, 1970; New York Rangers
- Playing career: 1970–1978

Duane Steven Wylie (born November 10, 1950) is a Canadian-American former ice hockey center. He played 14 games in the National Hockey League with the Chicago Black Hawks during the 1974–75 and 1976–77 seasons. The rest of his career, which lasted from 1970 to 1978, was spent in the minor leagues.

== Early life ==
Wylie was born in Spokane, Washington, and raised in Moose Jaw, Saskatchewan. He is one of five Spokane-born hockey players to make it to the NHL. Wylie played junior hockey with the Moose Jaw Canucks.

== Career ==
Wylie was drafted by the New York Rangers as the 81st pick of the 1970 NHL Amateur Draft. He played 14 games in the National Hockey League with the Chicago Black Hawks and spent the rest of his career with the Dallas Black Hawks.

== Career statistics ==
=== Regular season and playoffs ===
			Regular season					Playoffs
Season	Team	League	GP	G	A	Pts	PIM	GP	G	A	Pts	PIM
1967–68	Moose Jaw Canucks	WCHL	29	4	7	11	24	—	—	—	—	—
1968–69	Moose Jaw Canucks	SJHL	—	—	—	—	—	—	—	—	—	—
1969–70	St. Catharines Black Hawks	OHA	53	18	23	41	54	10	6	9	15	4
1970–71	Flint Generals	IHL	64	15	26	41	31	7	2	1	3	2
1971–72	Flint Generals	IHL	72	26	39	65	43	4	0	1	1	2
1972–73	Dallas Black Hawks	CHL	61	11	19	30	46	7	1	2	3	8
1973–74	Dallas Black Hawks	CHL	72	30	27	57	39	10	6	2	8	4
1974–75	Chicago Black Hawks	NHL	6	1	3	4	2	—	—	—	—	—
1974–75	Dallas Black Hawks	CHL	73	24	37	61	62	10	3	1	4	6
1975–76	Dallas Black Hawks	CHL	74	30	40	70	28	10	2	6	8	2
1976–77	Chicago Black Hawks	NHL	8	2	0	2	0	—	—	—	—	—
1976–77	Dallas Black Hawks	CHL	71	23	32	55	20	5	2	0	2	0
1977–78	Dallas Black Hawks	CHL	77	17	29	46	24	13	4	5	9	2
CHL totals			428	135	184	319	219	55	18	16	34	22
NHL totals			14	3	3	6	2	—	—	—	—	—
