= Gary Geldart =

Canadian ice hockey player

- Born: June 14, 1950 (age 75) Moncton, New Brunswick, Canada
- Height: 5 ft 8 in (173 cm)
- Weight: 160 lb (73 kg; 11 st 6 lb)
- Position: Defence
- Shot: Left
- Played for: Minnesota North Stars
- NHL draft: 89th overall, 1970; Minnesota North Stars
- Playing career: 1967–1978

Gary Daniel Geldart (born June 14, 1950) is a Canadian former professional ice hockey defenceman. Geldart was drafted by the Minnesota North Stars in 1970, and he played in four games with the teamduring the 1970–71 season. The remainder of Geldart's seven seasons as a professional player were spent in the American Hockey League. After his playing career, Geldart served as head hockey coach at University School in Hunting Valley, Ohio.

Geldart was born in Moncton, New Brunswick.

== Career statistics ==
=== Regular season and playoffs ===
			Regular season					Playoffs
Season	Team	League	GP	G	A	Pts	PIM	GP	G	A	Pts	PIM
1965–66	Moncton Red Wings	NBAHA	—	9	15	24	35	—	—	—	—	—
1966–67	Halifax Junior Canadiens	MJrHL	30	4	15	19	58	16	0	4	4	26
1967–68	Fredericton Junior Red Wings	NBJHL	4	1	3	4	8	12	1	10	11	25
1967–68	Fredericton Junior Red Wings	NBSHL	29	3	21	24	72	5	2	2	4	7
1968–69	Hamilton Red Wings	OHA	52	3	30	33	103	5	0	3	3	12
1969–70	Hamilton Red Wings	OHA	18	1	13	14	29	—	—	—	—	—
1969–70	London Knights	OHA	30	5	28	33	48	12	2	8	10	29
1970–71	Minnesota North Stars	NHL	4	0	0	0	5	—	—	—	—	—
1970–71	Cleveland Barons	AHL	67	5	19	24	84	—	—	—	—	—
1971–72	Cleveland Barons	AHL	71	3	19	22	44	6	0	3	3	8
1972–73	Cleveland/Jacksonville Barons	AHL	74	6	32	38	81	—	—	—	—	—
1973–74	Nova Scotia Voyageurs	AHL	49	1	21	22	59	6	0	2	2	2
1974–75	Nova Scotia Voyageurs	AHL	65	2	17	19	111	6	0	0	0	9
1975–76	Nova Scotia Voyageurs	AHL	—	—	—	—	—	9	0	2	2	—
1976–77	New Haven Nighthawks	AHL	79	6	34	40	110	6	0	0	0	2
1977–78	New Haven Nighthawks	AHL	9	0	0	0	12	14	0	1	1	32
AHL totals			414	23	142	165	501	47	0	8	8	53
NHL totals			4	0	0	0	5	—	—	—	—	—
