= Quintin Laing =

Canadian ice hockey player (born 1979)

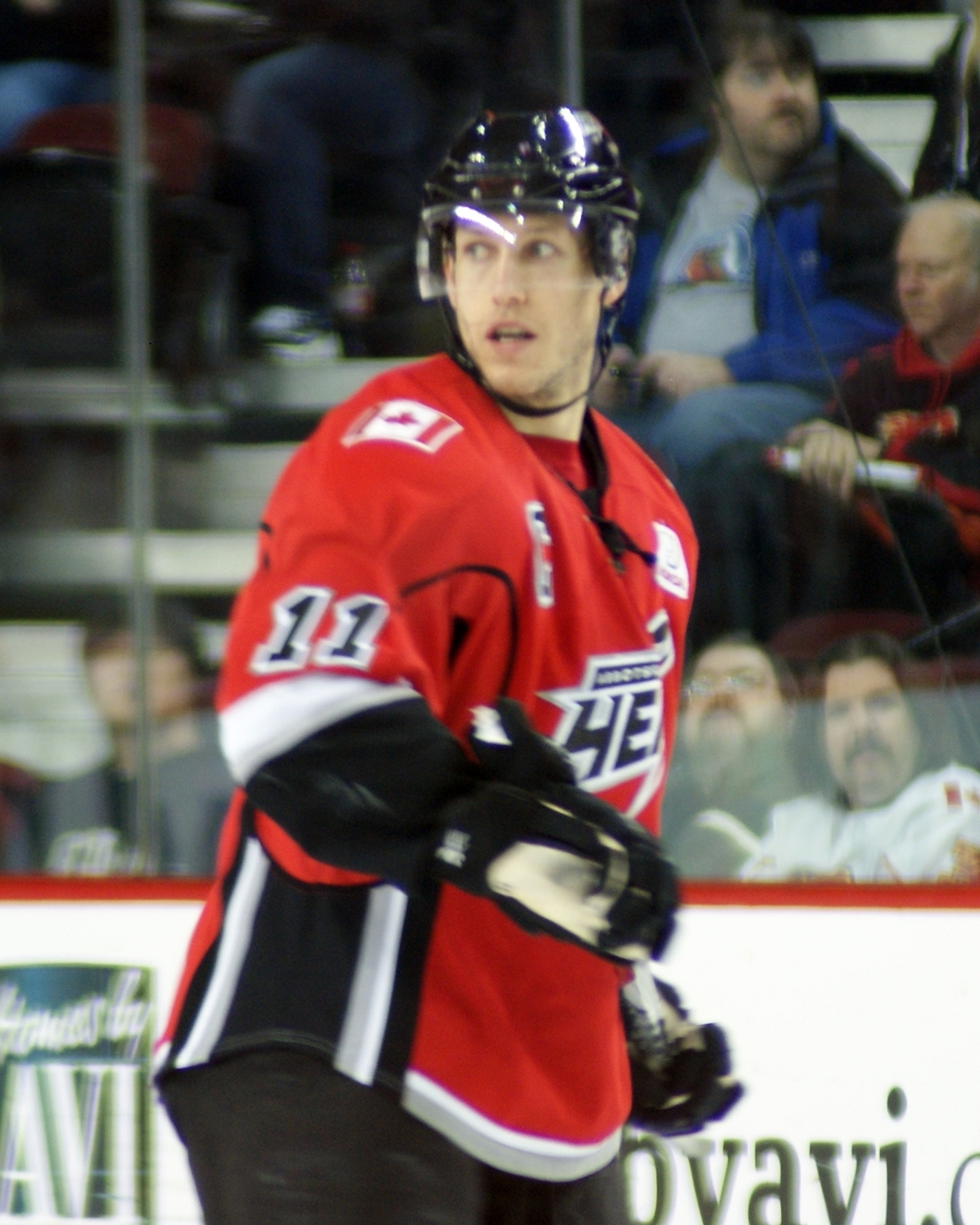
- Born: June 8, 1979 (age 46) Harris, Saskatchewan, Canada
- Height: 6 ft 2 in (188 cm)
- Weight: 200 lb (91 kg; 14 st 4 lb)
- Position: Left wing
- Shot: Left
- GET-ligaen team Former teams: Sparta Warriors; Washington Capitals; Chicago Blackhawks; Abbotsford Heat
- NHL draft: 102nd overall, 1997; Detroit Red Wings
- Playing career: 2000–2014

Quintin Laing (born June 8, 1979) is a Canadian former professional ice hockey player who last played in the GET-ligaen. His father, Bill Laing is also a Canadian former professional ice hockey player who played in the World Hockey Association (WHA).

== Career ==
Originally a draft choice of the Detroit Red Wings, Laing made his NHL debut for the Chicago Blackhawks during the 2003-2004 season, but only skated in three games. Laing has spent a great deal of time playing minor league hockey, most recently with the Hershey Bears, but has stood out to his team and fans alike as a player with great work ethic and commitment to the game. In the early 2010 season he was signed by the Abbotsford Heat, the AHL affiliate of the Calgary Flames.

=== Washington Capitals ===
During the 2007-2008 season, Laing was called up to replace the injured Boyd Gordon because of his penalty killing abilities. On his way to the airport, Laing made a promise to himself: play each shift as if it were his last. Laing made an immediate impact on the team, and his outstanding effort was rewarded as he remained on the team after Gordon returned from his injury.

Laing scored his first NHL goal, a game winner, on December 10, 2007, against Kevin Weekes of the New Jersey Devils, however he was most well known for his shot blocking skills, and led the NHL in blocked shots per game for a large portion of the season. Opponents scored fewer goals and took fewer shots per sixty minutes of ice time when Laing was on the ice than any other Capital. Laing is the Masterton Trophy nominee from the Capitals for the 2007-2008 season, which is awarded to the National Hockey League player who best exemplifies the qualities of perseverance, sportsmanship and dedication to hockey.

His teammates have offered glowing reviews of his dedication to the game: "He's a heart-and-soul guy," Capitals winger Brooks Laich said of Laing. "He lays his body out there, relentlessly and religiously in front of pucks. He does the little things that help you win." Goalie Brent Johnson added: "He's an old-time hockey player. People want to see scoring, but as a goaltender you appreciate guys like him. He went down and blocked a shot with his chest. I went up to him afterward, and said, 'Seriously, you keep that up and you're going to be here.'"

On October 6, 2008, Laing was put on waivers and sent to the Hershey Bears, the Washington Capitals AHL affiliate, as the Capitals were simply too deep at forward. Capitals coach, Bruce Boudreau said that it was one of toughest cuts he had ever had to make because, "Quintin was so proud to be a Washington Capital."

Laing was injured while playing with the Bears during the 2008-2009 season. After recovering, he was almost immediately called up to the Capitals due to multiple injuries in Washington's forward corps. His first NHL game of the year, against the Tampa Bay Lightning on March 19, 2009, resulted in an assist and a blocked shot in 10 minutes of ice time. However, after the game he began complaining of abdominal pain and the Capitals' trainer realized that he had a serious injury. He was taken to the hospital where it was discovered that he had torn his spleen. He was placed in intensive care and immediately ruled out for the remainder of the season. However, Laing returned for Hershey in game 3 of the AHL Eastern Conference finals.

Laing was the third NHL player to be diagnosed with swine flu within the same week. Capitals spokesman Nate Ewell reported that Laing was being treated for H1N1 while being kept well away from his fellow Capitals players. Laing sat out the next few games until he was well enough to return on Sunday, November 1. Laing scored his first goal of the season the night of his return.

In a November 17, 2009 tilt against the New York Rangers at [MSG], Laing, while sprawling on the ice to block a passing lane, suffered a broken jaw after a slapshot caught his face. He was placed on the long-term IR the next day and was expected to miss upwards of 6–8 weeks.

== Career statistics ==
			Regular season					Playoffs
Season	Team	League	GP	G	A	Pts	PIM	GP	G	A	Pts	PIM
1996–97	Kelowna Rockets	WHL	63	13	24	37	54	1	0	0	0	0
1997–98	Kelowna Rockets	WHL	59	11	24	35	47	7	0	1	1	8
1998–99	Kelowna Rockets	WHL	70	11	10	21	107	6	3	0	3	0
1999–00	Kelowna Rockets	WHL	68	22	30	52	61	5	1	1	2	8
2000–01	Jackson Bandits	ECHL	60	13	24	37	39	5	0	0	0	0
2000–01	Norfolk Admirals	AHL	10	0	1	1	10	–	–	–	–	–
2001–02	Jackson Bandits	ECHL	60	13	24	37	39	5	0	0	0	0
2001–02	Norfolk Admirals	AHL	61	6	15	21	32	4	0	0	0	2
2002–03	Norfolk Admirals	AHL	69	5	12	17	33	8	2	2	4	0
2003–04	Chicago Blackhawks	NHL	3	0	1	1	0	–	–	–	–	–
2003–04	Norfolk Admirals	AHL	78	12	10	22	74	8	5	1	6	4
2004–05	Norfolk Admirals	AHL	66	10	13	23	54	4	0	0	0	0
2005–06	Norfolk Admirals	AHL	73	14	31	45	70	4	0	0	0	0
2006–07	Hershey Bears	AHL	75	15	28	43	44	19	2	5	7	21
2007–08	Washington Capitals	NHL	39	1	5	6	10	–	–	–	–	–
2007–08	Hershey Bears	AHL	20	2	6	8	28	–	–	–	–	–
2008–09	Washington Capitals	NHL	1	0	0	0	0	–	–	–	–	–
2008–09	Hershey Bears	AHL	55	9	16	25	21	9	2	2	4	0
2008–09	Washington Capitals	NHL	1	0	0	0	0	–	–	–	–	–
2009–10	Washington Capitals	NHL	36	2	2	4	21	–	–	–	–	–
2009–10	Hershey Bears	AHL	2	0	0	0	0	–	–	–	–	–
2010–11	Victoria Salmon Kings	ECHL	4	0	1	1	0	–	–	–	–	–
2010–11	Abbotsford Heat	AHL	59	7	19	26	40	–	–	–	–	–
2011–12	Abbotsford Heat	AHL	58	11	11	22	31	1	0	0	0	0
2012–13	Abbotsford Heat	AHL	63	6	10	16	45	–	–	–	–	–
2013–14	Sparta Warriors	Norway	28	2	12	14	4	5	1	2	3	2
NHL totals			79	3	8	11	31	–	–	–	–	–
