= Jeff Rotsch =

American ice hockey player and businessman

- Born: July 22, 1950 (age 76) Minneapolis, Minnesota, U.S.
- Height: 6 ft 1 in (185 cm)
- Position: Defense
- Shot: Left
- Played for: University of Wisconsin
- National team: United States
- NHL draft: 112th overall, 1970; St. Louis Blues
- Playing career: 1968–1975

Jeffrey John Rotsch (born July 22, 1950) is an American retired ice hockey player and businessman.

== Early life and education ==
A native of Minneapolis, Minnesota, Rotsch captained his 1968 Southwest High School team to the Minneapolis City Conference title with an undefeated conference season. The team won the regional championship and went on to compete in the Minnesota State Hockey Tournament where they made it to the semifinals in 1968. He finished the season earning All City, All Region, and All State honors and was the highest scoring defenseman in the City Conference.

Rotsch received a Bachelor of Science degree in engineering from the University of Wisconsin–Madison in 1972 and an MBA degree in 1974 from the same institution.

== Career ==
=== University of Wisconsin ===
Rotsch played four years of ice hockey at the University of Wisconsin and was co-captain of the 1972 team. That season he also led WCHA defensemen in points and was awarded All-American honors, becoming the second-ever All-American in UW history. During his collegiate career, Rotsch played in two Frozen Fours (1970, 1972) with the Badgers finishing in third place both years. In 1973, Rotsch served as an assistant coach under head coach Bob Johnson. That year, the University of Wisconsin Men's Ice Hockey team won their first NCAA Hockey Championship.

=== NHL Draft ===
He was the first University of Wisconsin player as well as the first Minneapolis High School player to be drafted by the NHL. He was the 112th pick in the 1970 NHL Amateur Draft and was drafted by the St. Louis Blues. His draft rights were later traded to the Oakland Seals in 1972.

=== Team USA ===
Rotsch was a member of the 1972 US National Team which competed in the World Hockey Tournament in Bucharest, Romania. Rotsch also played on and co-captained the 1975 US Team in the World Championships in Munich and Dusseldorf, Germany.

=== Business career ===
Upon graduation from the University of Wisconsin with his MBA, Rotsch turned down the offer to play professional hockey and chose to start his business career. He started his career in marketing at General Mills in 1974 and spent 37 years at the company. During his tenure, he warbled as president of numerous divisions including Big G Cereal, Snacks, Betty Crocker, and Meals. In his final 12 years he was responsible for running Worldwide Sales for GMI with a total salesforce of 10,000.

Rotsch was a member of numerous boards including Minnesota Public Radio, Family and Children’s Services, and the Wisconsin School of Business, where he served as chairman for four years.

== Awards and recognition ==
In 2002, Rotsch was named a University of Wisconsin Distinguished Alumni. He has also been inducted into the Southwest High School Hall of Fame, the University of Wisconsin Hockey Hall of Fame, and, most recently into the Minneapolis Hockey Hall of Fame in 2019.

== Personal life ==
Jeff and his wife, Chris, reside in Naples, Florida, and have two children.

== Career statistics ==
=== Regular season and playoffs ===
			Regular season					Playoffs				
Season	Team	League	GP	G	A	Pts	PIM	GP	G	A	Pts	PIM
1967-68	Southwest High School	Minneapolis City	—	—	—	—	—	—	—	—	—	—
1968-69	University of Wisconsin (freshman)	WCHA	—	—	—	—	—	—	—	—	—	—
1969-70	University of Wisconsin	WCHA	28	1	12	13	26	2				
1970-71	University of Wisconsin	WCHA	34	1	10	11	36	—	—	—	—	—
1971-72	University of Wisconsin	WCHA	37	6	23	29	38	2				

=== International ===
Year	Team	Event	GP	G	A	Pts	PIM
1972	US National Team	WC	6	2	9	11	4
1975	US National Team	WC	10	0	0	0	6
International Totals

== Coaching statistics ==
Season	Team	Regular season			Postseason
Season	Team	Overall	Conference	Standing	Result
1972-73	University of Wisconsin	29-9-2	18-9-1	3rd	NCAA National Champion
1973-74	University of Wisconsin	18-13-5	12-11-5	5th	WCHA First Round
Total		47-22-7	30-20-6		
