= Bob Roselle =

Canadian ice hockey player

- Born: October 17, 1950 (age 75) Montreal, Quebec, Canada
- Height: 6 ft 2 in (188 cm)
- Weight: 185 lb (84 kg; 13 st 3 lb)
- Position: Centre
- Shot: Left
- Played for: Indianapolis Racers
- NHL draft: 69th overall, 1970; Boston Bruins
- Playing career: 1970–1977

Robert "Bob" Roselle (born October 17, 1950) is a Canadian former professional ice hockey player who played in the World Hockey Association (WHA). Roselle played one game with the Indianapolis Racers during the 1975–76 WHA season. He was drafted in the fifth round of the 1970 NHL Amateur Draft by the Boston Bruins.

== Career statistics ==
=== Regular season and playoffs ===
| | | | Regular season | | | | | Playoffs |
| Season | Team | League | GP | G | A | Pts | PIM | GP | G | A | Pts | PIM |
|---|---|---|---|---|---|---|---|---|---|---|---|---|
| 1966–67 | Montreal North Beavers | MMJHL | 15 | 3 | 1 | 4 | 6 | — | — | — | — | — |
| 1968–69 | London Knights | OHA | 52 | 17 | 34 | 51 | 50 | — | — | — | — | — |
| 1969–70 | Sorel Black Hawks | QMJHL | 32 | 22 | 26 | 48 | 20 | 10 | 1 | 8 | 9 | 10 |
| 1969–70 | London Knights | OHA | 18 | 4 | 15 | 19 | 6 | — | — | — | — | — |
| 1970–71 | Dayton–Toledo | IHL | 46 | 16 | 23 | 39 | 26 | — | — | — | — | — |
| 1971–72 | Kansas City Blues | CHL | 72 | 22 | 24 | 46 | 31 | — | — | — | — | — |
| 1972–73 | Seattle Totems | WHL | 5 | 1 | 0 | 1 | 2 | — | — | — | — | — |
| 1972–73 | Tulsa Oilers | CHL | 61 | 21 | 36 | 57 | 16 | — | — | — | — | — |
| 1973–74 | Seattle Totems | WHL | 59 | 13 | 19 | 32 | 10 | — | — | — | — | — |
| 1975–76 | Indianapolis Racers | WHA | 1 | 0 | 0 | 0 | 0 | — | — | — | — | — |
| 1975–76 | London Kings | CSAHL | Statistics Unavailable |
| 1976–77 | Brantford Alexanders | OHASr | 33 | 14 | 28 | 42 | 16 | — | — | — | — | — |
| WHA totals | | | 1 | 0 | 0 | 0 | 0 | – | – | – | – | – |
