= Doug Shelton =

Canadian ice hockey player

- Born: June 27, 1945 (age 79); Woodstock, Ontario, Canada
- Height: 5 ft 9 in (175 cm)
- Weight: 170 lb (77 kg; 12 st 2 lb)
- Position: Left wing
- Shot: Right
- Played for: Chicago Black Hawks
- Playing career: 1966–1970

Wayne Douglas Shelton (born June 27, 1945) is a Canadian former ice hockey player. He played five games in the National Hockey League with the Chicago Black Hawks during the 1967–68 season. The rest of his career, which lasted from 1966 to 1970, was spent in the minor leagues.

== Career statistics ==
=== Regular season and playoffs ===
| | | | Regular season | | | | | Playoffs |
| Season | Team | League | GP | G | A | Pts | PIM | GP | G | A | Pts | PIM |
|---|---|---|---|---|---|---|---|---|---|---|---|---|
| 1962–63 | Ingersoll Rockets | OHA-B | — | — | — | — | — | — | — | — | — | — |
| 1963–64 | St. Catharines Black Hawks | OHA | 56 | 3 | 9 | 12 | 16 | 13 | 0 | 0 | 0 | 0 |
| 1964–65 | St. Catharines Black Hawks | OHA | 56 | 8 | 8 | 16 | 16 | 5 | 0 | 0 | 0 | 4 |
| 1965–66 | St. Catharines Black Hawks | OHA | 48 | 36 | 24 | 60 | 16 | 7 | 1 | 2 | 3 | 10 |
| 1965–66 | St. Louis Braves | CHL | — | — | — | — | — | 2 | 0 | 0 | 0 | 0 |
| 1966–67 | St. Louis Braves | CHL | 68 | 11 | 23 | 34 | 4 | — | — | — | — | — |
| 1967–68 | Chicago Black Hawks | NHL | 5 | 0 | 1 | 1 | 2 | — | — | — | — | — |
| 1967–68 | Dallas Black Hawks | CHL | 65 | 19 | 39 | 58 | 22 | 5 | 0 | 2 | 2 | 0 |
| 1968–69 | Dallas Black Hawks | CHL | 69 | 17 | 27 | 44 | 30 | 11 | 3 | 4 | 7 | 10 |
| 1969–70 | Denver Spurs | WHL | 20 | 2 | 3 | 5 | 0 | — | — | — | — | — |
| 1969–70 | Springfield Kings | AHL | 28 | 1 | 4 | 5 | 4 | 14 | 4 | 8 | 12 | 6 |
| CHL totals | | | 133 | 30 | 62 | 92 | 26 | 7 | 0 | 2 | 2 | 0 |
| NHL totals | | | 5 | 0 | 1 | 1 | 2 | — | — | — | — | — |
