= Jack Taggart =

Canadian ice hockey player

Jack Taggart, Jr.
- Born: February 3, 1950 Calgary, Alberta, Canada
- Died: May 19, 2022 (aged 72) Kelowna, British Columbia, Canada
- Height: 6 ft 0 in (183 cm)
- Weight: 174 lb (79 kg; 12 st 6 lb)
- Position: Defence
- Played for: Cincinnati Swords (AHL); Kansas City Blues (CHL); Charlotte Checkers (EHL)
- National team: Canada
- NHL draft: 85th overall, 1970; St. Louis Blues
- Playing career: 1968–1973

Jack Taggart, Jr. (February 3, 1950 – May 19, 2022) was a Canadian professional ice hockey defenceman. Taggart was selected by the St. Louis Blues in the seventh round (85th overall) of the 1970 NHL entry draft.

Born in 1950 in Calgary, Alberta, Taggart played with the Canada men's national ice hockey team during the 1968-69 season, and then attended the University of Denver where he played with the Denver Pioneers men's ice hockey team. In January 1970, Taggart suffered serious injuries to his head and jaw as a result of a car accident.

Taggart began his professional career in 1970, and played the 1970–71 season with the St. Louis Blues' top farm team, the Kansas City Blues of the Central Hockey League. The following season and a half was spent in the American Hockey League with the Cincinnati Swords, and he concluded his playing career with the Charlotte Checkers of the EHL following the 1972-73 season.

== Personal information ==
Taggart's father, Jack Taggart Sr., played with Team Canada at the 1955 World Ice Hockey Championships.
