= Dave Gorman (ice hockey) =

Canadian ice hockey player (1955–2025)

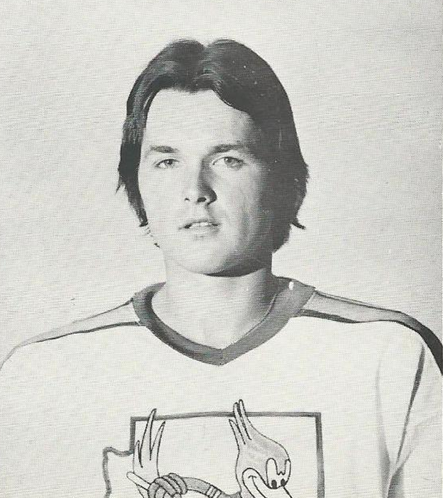
- Born: April 8, 1955 Oshawa, Ontario, Canada
- Died: May 2, 2025 (aged 70)
- Height: 5 ft 11 in (180 cm)
- Weight: 180 lb (82 kg; 12 st 12 lb)
- Position: Right wing
- Shot: Right
- Played for: Phoenix Roadrunners; Birmingham Bulls; Atlanta Flames
- NHL draft: 70th overall, 1975; Montreal Canadiens
- WHA draft: 16th overall, 1974; Phoenix Roadrunners
- Playing career: 1974–1985

David Peter Gorman (April 8, 1955 – May 2, 2025) was a Canadian professional ice hockey player who played in the World Hockey Association and briefly in the National Hockey League between 1975 and 1980.

== Hockey career ==
As a youth, Gorman played in the 1967 Quebec International Pee-Wee Hockey Tournament with the Toronto Swiss Chalet minor ice hockey team.

As a junior in the OHA, he played five seasons for the St. Catharines Black Hawks, making it to the 1974 Memorial Cup and winning the Jim Mahon Trophy as top scoring right winger.

Gorman by the NHL's Montreal Canadiens (70th overall, 1975) and WHA's Phoenix Roadrunners (16th overall, 1974) and chose to play in the WHA because of the higher salaries. Overall he scored 56 goals in 260 WHA games for Phoenix and the Birmingham Bulls. Gorman made a brief three-game cameo for the NHL's Atlanta Flames during 1979-80 season.

Gorman finished his career three seasons in the Swiss League. He helped lead Team Canada to victory in the 1984 Spengler Cup.

== Post hockey career ==
Following his on-ice career, Gorman coached hockey on the youth and high school level, while also owning an Arby's franchise and working in real estate.

Gorman was inducted into the St. Catharines Sports Hall of Fame in 2017.

== Death ==
Gorman died on May 2, 2025, at the age of 70.

== Career statistics ==
=== Regular season and playoffs ===
			Regular season					Playoffs
Season	Team	League	GP	G	A	Pts	PIM	GP	G	A	Pts	PIM
1970–71	St. Catharines Royals	OMHA	—	—	—	—	—	—	—	—	—	—
1970–71	St. Catharines Black Hawks	OHA	—	—	—	—	—	2	0	0	0	0
1971–72	St. Catharines Black Hawks	OHA	58	31	24	55	71	5	5	0	5	30
1972–73	St. Catharines Black Hawks	OHA	62	46	57	103	71	—	—	—	—	—
1973–74	St. Catharines Black Hawks	OHA	69	53	76	129	78	14	6	25	31	—
1973–74	St. Catharines Black Hawks	M-Cup	—	—	—	—	—	3	1	1	2	0
1974–75	Phoenix Roadrunners	WHA	13	3	5	8	10	—	—	—	—	—
1974–75	Tulsa Oilers	CHL	58	19	21	40	96	1	0	1	1	2
1975–76	Phoenix Roadrunners	WHA	67	11	20	31	28	5	0	2	2	24
1976–77	Phoenix Roadrunners	WHA	5	0	0	0	0	—	—	—	—	—
1976–77	Birmingham Bulls	WHA	52	9	13	22	38	—	—	—	—	—
1977–78	Birmingham Bulls	WHA	63	19	21	40	93	4	1	1	2	0
1977–78	Hampton Gulls	AHL	2	0	0	0	12	—	—	—	—	—
1978–79	Birmingham Bulls	WHA	60	14	24	38	18	—	—	—	—	—
1979–80	Birmingham Bulls	CHL	75	22	43	65	75	4	1	1	2	2
1979–80	Atlanta Flames	NHL	3	0	0	0	0	—	—	—	—	—
1980–81	Nova Scotia Voyageurs	AHL	78	43	47	90	82	6	1	2	3	8
1981–82	Rochester Americans	AHL	77	26	41	67	131	8	3	4	7	11
1982–83	GCK Lions	NLB	28	48	19	67	—	—	—	—	—	—
1983–84	SC Herisau	NLB	28	36	26	62	—	10	5	12	17	—
1984–85	SC Herisau	NLB	28	47	54	101	—	—	—	—	—	—
WHA totals			260	56	83	139	187	9	1	3	4	24
NHL totals			3	0	0	0	0	—	—	—	—	—
