= St. Catharines Black Hawks =

Canadian junior ice hockey team (1962–1976)

- City: St. Catharines, Ontario
- League: Ontario Hockey Association (1962–1974); Ontario Major Junior Hockey League (1974–1976)
- Operated: 1962–1976
- Home arena: Garden City Arena
- Parent clubs: Chicago Black Hawks (1962–1967)

Franchise history
- 1943–1947: St. Catharines Falcons
- 1947–1962: St. Catharines Teepees
- 1962–1976: St. Catharines Black Hawks
- 1976–1982: Niagara Falls Flyers
- 1982–2002: North Bay Centennials
- 2002–present: Saginaw Spirit

The St. Catharines Black Hawks were a Canadian junior ice hockey team in the Ontario Hockey Association (OHA) from 1962 to 1974, and the Ontario Major Junior Hockey League from 1974 to 1976. The Black Hawks were based in St. Catharines, Ontario, won the J. Ross Robertson Cup as OHA junior champions in 1971 and 1974, and played home games at the Garden City Arena.

== History ==
In 1962 the Chicago Black Hawks sponsored the financially troubled St. Catharines Teepees, and renamed the team St. Catharines Black Hawks, until NHL sponsorship ended in 1968. From 1968 until 1972, the Hawks were owned by Fred Muller and Ken Campbell.

St. Catharines made it to the OHA finals in 1969, 1971 and 1974. They were beaten in the 1969 OHA finals by the Montreal Junior Canadiens 4 wins to 0 with 2 ties. The Black Hawks won the J. Ross Robertson Cup in 1971 versus the Toronto Marlboros and 1974 versus the Peterborough Petes.

Hap Emms bought the Black Hawks in 1972 and for the next four years attendance declined, Emms moved the club to Niagara Falls in 1976, rejuvenating the name of the previous Niagara Falls Flyers team which Emms had also owned.

=== Richardson Cup 1971 ===
The 1971 George Richardson Memorial Trophy series, was the last Eastern Canadian championship to be played before the Memorial Cup tournament began in 1972. The series that featured future NHL stars Guy Lafleur and Marcel Dionne. Disputes off the ice and erupting violence abruped the series before it was finished.

The Black Hawks and Remparts series was intense on many levels. Besides the strong rivalry between Anglophone and Francophone hockey teams and Canadian citizens in general, there was unfinished business between Marcel Dionne and the Remparts coach Maurice Filion. Dionne had been coached by Filion in 1968 as a member of the Drummondville Rangers of the Quebec Junior Hockey League. When the Quebec Major Junior Hockey League formed in 1969, Dionne departed to play in the OHA, which was seen as a higher-calibre level of competition, to hone his skills. Filion vowed revenge against his OHA team. This rivalry was further fueled by the desire of Francophone nationalists to have a Canadian champion from a Quebec team in a Quebec-based league.

The Remparts won the first game 4-2 played in St. Catharines and televised by closed circuit to over 8,000 spectators in Quebec arenas. Despite the win, Filion complained about the referee bias against his players, calling it anti-Francophone. The Black Hawks won game 2 by a score of 8–3, to tie the series at 1 game each.

Game 3 was played in the Colisée de Québec to an overflow crowd, seeing the Remparts win 3–1. There were a total of 102 penalty minutes called, 77 of those were against the Black Hawks. Brian MacKenize of St. Catharines would be suspended for one game after confronting a linesman.

The next game of the series was uglier than the last game. Another overflow crowd saw the Remparts win game 4 by a score of 6–1. As the game wore on, more and more fights broke out on the ice, involving players leaving the penalty box to join the fray. The St. Catharines players were escorted off the ice by police amidst the hurling of debris from Quebec fans. After the game an angry mob surrounded the St. Catharines team bus on its way to the motel, and was given a police escort to safety. The mob circled the motel until the early hours of the morning.

Game 5 was played on neutral ice at Maple Leaf Gardens in Toronto, which the Black Hawks won 6–3 to narrow the series 3 games to 2 for Quebec. That was the last game played.

The parents of the St. Catharines players refused to send their children back to Quebec City for fear of the violence that occurred after game four. The Remparts refused to play anywhere else but their home rink, including any neutral ice in the province of Quebec. The problem was further confounded with threats surfacing from the FLQ (Front de libération du Québec) against St. Catharines players.

CAHA president Earl Dawson declared the series to be over when no further compromise could be reached, and he had received official notice from St. Catharines that the team would not return to the Colisée. As a result, the Remparts went on to compete for the Memorial Cup by default, which they won, defeating the Edmonton Oil Kings.

=== Memorial Cup 1974 ===
In the 1974 Memorial Cup tournament the Black Hawks would square up against the Regina Pats and a rematch versus the Quebec Remparts. St. Catharines was undefeated through the OHA playoffs to reach the Memorial Cup, eliminating the Oshawa Generals, Toronto Marlboros and Peterborough Petes in the process, with a tie against Peterborough in the finals being the only blemish on their record.

The entire cup series would be played in Calgary, Alberta at the Stampede Corral. This venue was much to the liking of St. Catharines players, who were not wanting to relive the Quebec City experience from 3 years ago. St. Catharines played a strong defensive game to open the tournament, getting some vengeance from three years ago. However, the Remparts scored 5 power play goals in the semi-final game and trounced the Black Hawks 11–3.

Game 1	St. Catharines	4	vs.	Quebec Remparts	1
Game 2	Regina Pats	4	vs.	St. Catharines	0
Game 3	Quebec Remparts	5	vs.	Regina Pats	3
Semi-final	Quebec Remparts	11	vs.	St. Catharines	3
Final	Regina Pats	7	vs.	Quebec Remparts	4

== Award winners ==
Season	Player	Award(s)	Recognition	Source
1963–64	Fred Stanfield	Max Kaminsky Trophy	OHA humanitarian of the year	
1964–65	Ken Hodge	Eddie Powers Memorial Trophy	OHA scoring champion	
1966–67	Peter McDuffe	Dave Pinkney Trophy	OHA lowest team GAA	
1969–70	Marcel Dionne	Eddie Powers Memorial Trophy	OHA scoring champion	
1970–71	Marcel Dionne	Eddie Powers Memorial Trophy	OHA scoring champion	
1973–74	Dave Gorman	Jim Mahon Memorial Trophy	OHA top scoring right winger	

== Notable players ==
Two future Hockey Hall of Fame inductees played for the Black Hawks: including two-time OHA scoring champion Marcel Dionne (1968–1971), and Mike Gartner in his rookie year (1975–76).

Notable Black Hawks players that also played in the National Hockey League or World Hockey Association:

- Rick Adduono
- Ron Anderson
- Mike Bloom
- Kerry Bond
- Ken Breitenbach
- John Brenneman
- Don Burgess
- Dave Burrows
- Gary Cunningham
- Guy Delparte
- Marcel Dionne
- Rick Dudley
- Doug Favell
- John Fisher
- Dave Fortier
- Lou Franceschetti
- Bob Froese
- Mike Gartner
- Frank Golembrosky
- Dave Gorman
- Pierre Guité
- Rick Hampton
- Richie Hansen
- Ken Hodge
- Brent Hughes
- Dennis Hull
- Glen Irwin
- Tim Jacobs
- Jeff Jacques
- Doug Jarrett
- Jerry Korab
- Moe L'Abbé
- Larry Landon
- Garry Lariviere
- Jean-Paul LeBlanc
- Bob MacMillan
- Wayne Maki
- Bob Manno
- Peter Mara
- Gary McAdam
- Don McCulloch
- Brian McDonald
- Al McDonough
- Peter McDuffe
- Brian McKenzie
- Dennis O'Brien
- Don O'Donoghue
- Dennis Owchar
- Wilf Paiement
- Jim Pettie
- Willi Plett
- Jan Popiel
- Poul Popiel
- Dick Redmond
- Tom Reid
- Doug Rombough
- Barry Salovaara
- Dave Salvian
- Ron Serafini
- Paul Shakes
- Bobby Sheehan
- Doug Shelton
- Bob Sicinski
- Ron Smith
- Bob Sneddon
- Fred Stanfield
- Jim Stanfield
- Bill Stewart
- Dave Syvret
- Bobby Taylor
- Vic Teal
- Paul Terbenche
- Gord Titcomb
- Dennis Ververgaert
- Ron Wilson
- Duane Wylie
- Bill Young

Other notable players include:

- Richie Bayes
- Dennis Giannini
- Joe Grant
- Bill Joyce
- Jim Pearson
- Dale Power
- Peter Tufford

== Season-by-season results ==
Regular season and playoffs results:

Legend: GP = Games played, W = Wins, L = Losses, T = Ties, Pts = Points, GF = Goals for, GA = Goals against

Memorial Cup champions	League champions	League finalists

Season	Regular season									Playoffs
Season	GP	W	L	T	Pts	Pct	GF	GA	Finish	Playoffs
1962–63	50	15	24	11	41	0.410	172	224	5th OHA	Did not qualify
1963–64	56	29	20	7	65	0.580	244	215	3rd OHA	Won quarterfinals (Oshawa Generals) 8–4; Lost semifinals (Montreal Junior Canadiens) 9–5
1964–65	56	19	28	9	41	0.420	236	253	7th OHA	Lost quarterfinals (Peterborough Petes) 8–2
1965–66	48	15	26	7	37	0.385	182	231	8th OHA	Lost quarterfinals (Oshawa Generals) 8–6
1966–67	48	19	20	9	47	0.490	175	155	5th OHA	Lost quarterfinals (Kitchener Rangers) 9–3
1967–68	54	21	30	3	45	0.417	200	211	6th OHA	Lost quarterfinals (Montreal Junior Canadiens) 9–1
1968–69	54	31	11	12	74	0.685	296	206	2nd OHA	Won quarterfinals (Toronto Marlboros) 8–4; Won semifinals (Niagara Falls Flyers) 8–6; Lost OHA finals (Montreal Junior Canadiens) 9–1
1969–70	54	30	18	6	66	0.611	268	210	3rd OHA	Won quarterfinals (Kitchener Rangers) 8–4; Lost semifinals (Montreal Junior Canadiens) 8–0
1970–71	62	40	17	5	85	0.685	343	236	2nd OHA	Won quarterfinals (Kitchener Rangers) 8–0; Won semifinals (Montreal Junior Canadiens) 9–5; Won OHA finals (Toronto Marlboros) 8–0; Forfeited George Richardson Memorial Trophy playoffs (Quebec Remparts) 3–2
1971–72	63	25	31	7	57	0.452	258	311	7th OHA	Lost quarterfinals (Peterborough Petes) 8–2
1972–73	63	24	28	11	59	0.468	280	318	5th OHA	Lost quarterfinals (Toronto Marlboros) 8–0
1973–74	70	41	23	6	88	0.629	358	278	2nd OHA	Won quarterfinals (Oshawa Generals) 9–1; Won semifinals (Toronto Marlboros) 8–0; Won OHA finals (Peterborough Petes) 9–1; Lost 1974 Memorial Cup semifinal (Quebec Remparts) 11–3
1974–75	70	30	33	7	67	0.479	284	300	6th OMJHL	Lost quarterfinals (Hamilton Fincups) 8–0
1975–76	66	16	40	10	42	0.318	283	366	5th Emms	Lost first round (Kitchener Rangers) 6–2

== Sources ==
- Lapp, Richard M.; Macaulay, Alec (1997). The Memorial Cup: Canada's National Junior Hockey Championship. Madeira Park, British Columbia: Harbour Publishing. ISBN 1-55017-170-4.
