= Errol Thompson (ice hockey) =

Canadian ice hockey player (born 1950)

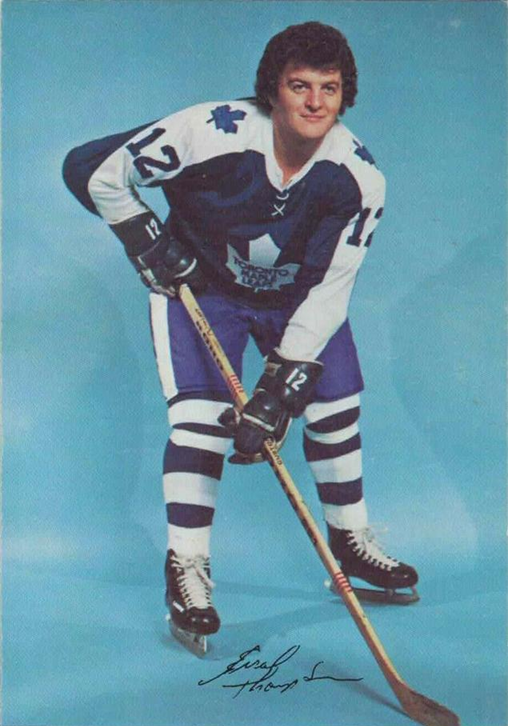
- Thompson in 1975 postcard
- Born: May 28, 1950 (age 75) Summerside, Prince Edward Island, Canada
- Height: 5 ft 9 in (175 cm)
- Weight: 185 lb (84 kg; 13 st 3 lb)
- Position: Left wing
- Shot: Left
- Played for: Toronto Maple Leafs; Detroit Red Wings; Pittsburgh Penguins
- NHL draft: 22nd overall, 1970; Toronto Maple Leafs
- Playing career: 1970–1981

Loran Errol Thompson (born May 28, 1950) is a Canadian former professional ice hockey winger who played most of his NHL career with the Toronto Maple Leafs. He was selected 2nd (22nd overall) by the Toronto Maple Leafs in the 1970 Amateur Draft. Thompson is also a former captain of the Detroit Red Wings.

== Junior and senior leagues ==
Thompson started turning heads at a young age while playing for the Halifax Jr. Canadians of the NSJHL. In the 1967–68 season, he scored 81 points in only 45 games, cementing him as a legitimate scoring winger. However, in 1969 Thompson was still an undiscovered talent playing in P.E.I.'s Southern New Brunswick Senior Hockey League senior league with the Charlottetown Royals for $15 a game when he was spotted by legendary Leaf goalie-turned-scout Johnny Bower. He was drafted 22nd overall in the 1970 Amateur NHL Draft and made his NHL debut in 1970, playing in only one game. He played the rest of that year and the next on Toronto's minor league club, the Tulsa Oilers of the Central Hockey League.

== NHL career ==
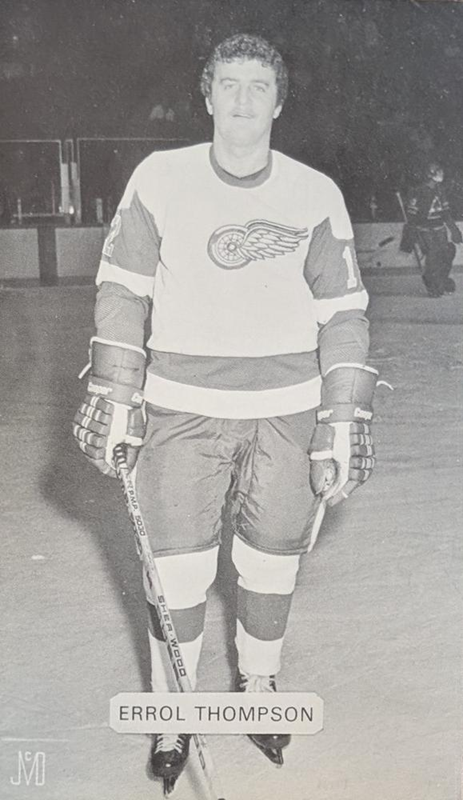
1970s postcard of Thompson for Detroit Red Wings

In 1972, Thompson was called up to play full-time for Toronto and with his blazing speed and scoring touch quickly established himself as a reliable offensive NHL talent. On a Leaf team that lost more games than it won, he scored 32 points in his first NHL season. Thompson began improving with each year and in the 1974–75 season scored 25 goals. Next season, on a line with Darryl Sittler and Lanny McDonald, he scored 43 goals, becoming the second player in Leaf history, after Frank Mahovlich, to score 40 goals in a season. The Thompson-Sittler-McDonald line became well known throughout North America after Sittler set an NHL record with ten points in one game on February 7, 1976.

After breaking his arm in the 1976–77 season, Thompson missed one half of the season but still managed 21 goals. The offensively talented winger began to see less ice time under defense-oriented coach Roger Neilson and was eventually traded with various draft picks to the Detroit Red Wings for Dan Maloney and a future second round draft pick, on March 13, 1978. With Detroit, Thompson continued to produce, scoring 23 goals his first full season and 34 goals the following season. In 1980, he was named co-captain of the Wings, splitting time with Reed Larson. After scoring 26 points in the 1980–81 season he was traded to the Pittsburgh Penguins for Gary McAdam on January 8 and played his final 34 games in Pittsburgh.

== Career statistics ==
			Regular season					Playoffs
Season	Team	League	GP	G	A	Pts	PIM	GP	G	A	Pts	PIM
1966–67	Halifax Jr. Canadians	Exhib.	47	28	32	60	29	—	—	—	—	—
1966–67	Halifax Jr. Canadians	M-Cup	—	—	—	—	—	17	15	9	24	9
1967–68	Halifax Jr. Canadians	Exhib.	45	41	40	81	55	—	—	—	—	—
1967–68	Halifax Jr. Canadians	M-Cup	—	—	—	—	—	11	6	7	13	12
1968–69	Halifax Jr. Canadians	MaJHL	30	11	18	29	25	—	—	—	—	—
1969–70	Charlottetown Royals	NBSHL	20	13	23	36	—	3	1	3	4	0
1970–71	Tulsa Oilers	CHL	65	15	14	29	37	—	—	—	—	—
1970–71	Toronto Maple Leafs	NHL	1	0	0	0	0	—	—	—	—	—
1971–72	Tulsa Oilers	CHL	46	21	21	42	30	13	4	6	10	8
1972–73	Toronto Maple Leafs	NHL	68	13	19	32	8	—	—	—	—	—
1973–74	Toronto Maple Leafs	NHL	56	7	8	15	6	2	0	1	1	0
1974–75	Toronto Maple Leafs	NHL	65	25	17	42	12	6	0	0	0	9
1975–76	Toronto Maple Leafs	NHL	75	43	37	80	26	10	3	3	6	0
1976–77	Toronto Maple Leafs	NHL	41	21	16	37	8	9	2	0	2	0
1977–78	Toronto Maple Leafs	NHL	59	17	22	39	10	—	—	—	—	—
1977–78	Detroit Red Wings	NHL	14	5	1	6	2	7	2	1	3	2
1978–79	Detroit Red Wings	NHL	70	23	31	54	26	—	—	—	—	—
1979–80	Detroit Red Wings	NHL	77	34	14	48	22	—	—	—	—	—
1980–81	Detroit Red Wings	NHL	39	14	12	26	52	—	—	—	—	—
1980–81	Pittsburgh Penguins	NHL	34	6	8	14	12	—	—	—	—	—
NHL totals			599	208	185	393	184	34	7	5	12	11

Preceded by Dale McCourt	Detroit Red Wings captain 1980–81 with Reed Larson	Succeeded by Reed Larson
