= Paul Shakes =

Canadian ice hockey player

- Born: September 4, 1952 (age 72); Collingwood, Ontario, Canada
- Height: 5 ft 10 in (178 cm)
- Weight: 175 lb (79 kg; 12 st 7 lb)
- Position: Defence
- Shot: Right
- Played for: California Golden Seals
- NHL draft: 38th overall, 1972; California Golden Seals
- Playing career: 1972–1976

Paul Steven Shakes (born September 4, 1952) is a Canadian former professional ice hockey defenceman who played 21 games in the National Hockey League for the California Golden Seals during the 1973–74 season. The rest of his career, which lasted from 1972 to 1976, was spent in different minor leagues.

== Career statistics ==
=== Regular season and playoffs ===
| | | | Regular season | | | | | Playoffs |
| Season | Team | League | GP | G | A | Pts | PIM | GP | G | A | Pts | PIM |
|---|---|---|---|---|---|---|---|---|---|---|---|---|
| 1969–70 | St. Catharines Black Hawks | OHA | 42 | 7 | 24 | 31 | 50 | — | — | — | — | — |
| 1970–71 | St. Catharines Black Hawks | OHA | 60 | 14 | 57 | 71 | 49 | — | — | — | — | — |
| 1971–72 | St. Catharines Black Hawks | OHA | 61 | 20 | 48 | 68 | 61 | — | — | — | — | — |
| 1972–73 | Salt Lake Golden Eagles | WHL | 71 | 11 | 31 | 42 | 59 | 9 | 1 | 3 | 4 | 8 |
| 1973–74 | California Golden Seals | NHL | 21 | 0 | 4 | 4 | 12 | — | — | — | — | — |
| 1973–74 | Salt Lake Golden Eagles | WHL | 54 | 3 | 35 | 38 | 40 | 5 | 0 | 1 | 1 | 7 |
| 1974–75 | Springfield Kings | AHL | 74 | 11 | 32 | 43 | 60 | 17 | 4 | 9 | 13 | 17 |
| 1975–76 | Salt Lake Golden Eagles | CHL | 26 | 3 | 16 | 19 | 16 | — | — | — | — | — |
| NHL totals | | | 21 | 0 | 4 | 4 | 12 | — | — | — | — | — |

== Awards & records ==
- 1972 OHA First All-Star Team
