= Dennis Giannini =

Canadian ice hockey player

- Born: July 13, 1950 (age 75) Kirkland Lake, Ontario, Canada
- Height: 5 ft 9 in (175 cm)
- Weight: 180 lb (82 kg; 12 st 12 lb)
- Position: Left wing
- Shot: n/a
- Played for: AHL; Quebec Aces; Cleveland Barons; New Haven Nighthawks; Baltimore Clippers; Rhode Island Reds; WHL; Portland Buckaroos; Serie A HC Valpellice
- NHL draft: 74th overall, 1970; Philadelphia Flyers
- Playing career: 1970–1978

Dennis Giannini (born July 13, 1950) is a Canadian former professional ice hockey left winger who played eight seasons in the American Hockey League (AHL), Western Hockey League (WHL) and the Italian Serie A. He was selected by the Philadelphia Flyers in the 6th round (74th overall) of the 1970 NHL Amateur Draft.

== Career statistics ==
=== Regular season and playoffs ===
			Regular season					Playoffs
Season	Team	League	GP	G	A	Pts	PIM	GP	G	A	Pts	PIM
1967–68	St. Catharines Black Hawks	OHA	50	15	18	33	20	—	—	—	—	—
1968–69	St. Catharines Black Hawks	OHA	50	37	44	81	39	—	—	—	—	—
1969–70	St. Catharines Black Hawks	OHA	25	20	30	50	18	—	—	—	—	—
1969–70	London Knights	OHA	28	21	18	39	16	—	—	—	—	—
1970–71	Quebec Aces	AHL	70	28	15	43	40	1	0	0	0	5
1971–72	Cleveland Barons	AHL	69	28	16	44	87	6	4	0	4	6
1972–73	Cleveland Barons	AHL	67	24	18	42	103	—	—	—	—	—
1973–74	Portland Buckaroos	WHL	77	44	31	75	80	5	2	1	3	9
1974–75	New Haven Nighthawks	AHL	49	6	7	13	44	—	—	—	—	—
1975–76	Baltimore Clippers	AHL	76	36	21	57	49	—	—	—	—	—
1976–77	Rhode Island Reds	AHL	10	2	2	4	4	—	—	—	—	—
1976–77	Baltimore Clippers	SHL	31	13	2	15	21	—	—	—	—	—
1977–78	HC Valpellice	ITA	—	43	16	59	—	—	—	—	—	—
AHL totals			341	124	79	203	327	7	4	0	4	11

== Awards and honours ==
- WHL 2nd All-Star Team (1973–74)
