= Charlottetown Royals =

Former Canadian professional hockey team

The Charlottetown Royals were a professional men's Intermediate "A" ice hockey team playing out of Prince Edward Island, Canada. NHL players who have played for the Royals were Errol Thompson and Wes Trainor.
