= Ron Climie =

Canadian ice hockey player

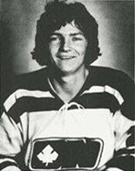
- Born: March 4, 1950 (age 76) Hamilton, Ontario, Canada
- Height: 5 ft 11 in (180 cm)
- Weight: 185 lb (84 kg; 13 st 3 lb)
- Position: Left wing
- Shot: Left
- Played for: Ottawa Nationals; Edmonton Oilers; New England Whalers
- NHL draft: 37th overall, 1970; St. Louis Blues
- Playing career: 1970–1977

Ronald Malcolm Climie (born March 4, 1950) is a Canadian former professional ice hockey player who played 249 games in the World Hockey Association (WHA). He played for the Ottawa Nationals in the WHA's inaugural (1972–73) season, then the Edmonton Oilers and New England Whalers. He also played in the first two WHA all-star games. Climie was the Oilers' team-scoring champion in their second (1973–74) season.

== Career statistics ==
			Regular season					Playoffs
Season	Team	League	GP	G	A	Pts	PIM	GP	G	A	Pts	PIM
1965–66	Hamilton Mountain Bees	OHA-Jr.B	29	13	23	36	14	—	—	—	—	—
1966–67	Hamilton Red Wings	OHA-Jr.	54	20	23	43	26	—	—	—	—	—
1967–68	Hamilton Red Wings	OHA-Jr.	50	37	23	60	9	—	—	—	—	—
1969–70	Hamilton Red Wings	OHA-Jr.	54	26	28	54	25	—	—	—	—	—
1970–71	Kansas City Blues	CHL	69	15	25	40	10	—	—	—	—	—
1971–72	Kansas City Blues	CHL	71	31	30	61	13	—	—	—	—	—
1971–72	Denver Spurs	WHL-Sr.	1	0	0	0	0	—	—	—	—	—
1972–73	Ottawa Nationals	WHA	31	12	19	31	2	4	1	0	1	2
1973–74	Edmonton Oilers	WHA	76	38	36	74	22	5	0	0	0	0
1974–75	Edmonton Oilers	WHA	49	15	27	42	15	—	—	—	—	—
1974–75	New England Whalers	WHA	25	8	4	12	12	6	3	0	3	0
1975–76	New England Whalers	WHA	65	25	20	45	17	—	—	—	—	—
1976–77	Rhode Island Reds	AHL	5	1	3	4	0	—	—	—	—	—
1976–77	New England Whalers	WHA	3	0	0	0	0	—	—	—	—	—
WHA totals			249	98	106	204	68	15	4	0	4	2

Preceded by Jim Harrison	Edmonton Oilers Regular Season Scoring Leader; 1973/1974	Succeeded by Mike Rogers
