= Gary Doyle =

Canadian ice hockey player (b. 1949)

- Born: January 6, 1949 (age 77) Smiths Falls, Ontario, Canada
- Height: 5 ft 8 in (173 cm)
- Weight: 155 lb (70 kg; 11 st 1 lb)
- Position: Goaltender
- Caught: Left
- Played for: Edmonton Oilers
- NHL draft: 56th overall, 1969; Montreal Canadiens
- Playing career: 1969–1975

Gary Doyle (born January 6, 1949, in Smiths Falls, Ontario) is a former professional ice hockey goaltender. He was selected in the fifth round of the 1969 NHL Amateur Draft, 56th overall, by the Montreal Canadiens, but he never played in the NHL. Doyle spent one season at the University of Ottawa, and three seasons in the minor professional leagues (WHL, CHL, SHL). Doyle did, however, play one game for the Edmonton Oilers of the WHA.

Doyle played his amateur career in the OHA, playing for the Ottawa 67's in their first year of competition. After his retirement he became involved in municipal politics, eventually becoming county warden of Lanark County, Ontario.

== Career statistics ==
			Regular season									Playoffs
Season	Team	League	GP	W	L	T	MIN	GA	SO	GAA	SV%	GP	W	L	MIN	GA	SO	GAA	SV%
1965–66	Smiths Falls Bears	CJHL	Statistics Unavailable
1967–68	Ottawa 67's	OHA	50	Statistics Unavailable
1968–69	Ottawa 67's	OHA	50	—	—	—	—	229	0	4.50	—	—	—	—	—	—	—	—	—
1969–70	Salt Lake Golden Eagles	WHL	3	—	—	—	150	18	0	7.20	—	—	—	—	—	—	—	—	—
1969–70	Oklahoma City Blazers	CHL	9	4	5	0	493	42	0	5.04	—	—	—	—	—	—	—	—	—
1972–73	University of Ottawa	OUA	—	—	—	—	500	49	0	5.88	—	—	—	—	—	—	—	—	—
1973–74	Edmonton Oilers	WHA	1	1	0	0	60	4	0	4.00	.895	—	—	—	—	—	—	—	—
1973–74	Winston-Salem Polar Twins	SHL	48	16	27	2	2800	216	2	4.63	.880	3	—	—	—	—	—	—	—
1974–75	Winston-Salem Polar Twins	SHL	27	9	12	0	1380	108	0	4.70	.879	—	—	—	—	—	—	—	—
WHA totals			1	1	0	0	60	4	0	4.00	.895	—	—	—	—	—	—	—	—
