= Jim McCrimmon =

Canadian ice hockey player

- Born: May 29, 1953 (age 73) Ponoka, Alberta, Canada
- Height: 6 ft 2 in (188 cm)
- Weight: 220 lb (100 kg; 15 st 10 lb)
- Position: Defence
- Shot: Right
- Played for: Edmonton Oilers; St. Louis Blues; Calgary Cowboys
- NHL draft: 54th overall, 1973; Los Angeles Kings
- WHA draft: 20th overall, 1973; Alberta Oilers
- Playing career: 1973–1978

James Duncan McCrimmon (born May 29, 1953) is a Canadian former professional ice hockey defenceman. He played 2 games in the National Hockey League for the St. Louis Blues during the 1974–75 season. He also played 114 games in the World Hockey Association with the Edmonton Oilers and Calgary Cowboys from 1973 to 1975. McCrimmon was born in Ponoka, Alberta.

== Career statistics ==
=== Regular season and playoffs ===
			Regular season					Playoffs
Season	Team	League	GP	G	A	Pts	PIM	GP	G	A	Pts	PIM
1969–70	Ponoka Stampeders	AJHL	41	3	12	15	91	—	—	—	—	—
1970–71	Ponoka Stampeders	AJHL	10	0	3	3	8	—	—	—	—	—
1970–71	Medicine Hat Tigers	WCHL	52	1	4	5	89	—	—	—	—	—
1971–72	Medicine Hat Tigers	WCHL	53	3	20	23	270	—	—	—	—	—
1972–73	Medicine Hat Tigers	WCHL	54	7	30	37	179	17	3	5	8	76
1972–73	Medicine Hat Tigers	M-Cup	—	—	—	—	—	2	0	0	0	4
1973–74	Edmonton Oilers	WHA	75	2	3	5	106	—	—	—	—	—
1974–75	Edmonton Oilers	WHA	34	1	5	6	50	—	—	—	—	—
1974–75	St. Louis Blues	NHL	2	0	0	0	0	—	—	—	—	—
1974–75	Winston-Salem Polar Twins	SHL	21	8	13	21	64	—	—	—	—	—
1975–76	Calgary Cowboys	WHA	5	0	0	0	2	—	—	—	—	—
1975–76	Providence Reds	AHL	47	1	9	10	94	—	—	—	—	—
1975–76	Baltimore Clippers	AHL	9	1	0	1	6	—	—	—	—	—
1976–77	Richmond Wildcats	SHL	33	6	18	24	58	—	—	—	—	—
1976–77	Mohawk Valley Comets	NAHL	13	0	5	5	14	—	—	—	—	—
1977–78	Kimberley Dynamiters	WIHL	40	9	28	37	68	—	—	—	—	—
WHA totals			114	3	8	11	158	—	—	—	—	—
NHL totals			2	0	0	0	0	—	—	—	—	—
