= Bill Laing =

Canadian ice hockey player

- Born: March 24, 1953 (age 72) Harris, Saskatchewan, Canada
- Height: 6 ft 2 in (188 cm)
- Weight: 190 lb (86 kg; 13 st 8 lb)
- Position: Centre
- Shot: Left
- Played for: Edmonton Oilers (WHA)
- NHL draft: 72nd overall, 1973; St. Louis Blues
- WHA draft: 39th overall, 1973; Alberta Oilers
- Playing career: 1973–1976

Bill Laing (born March 24, 1953) is a Canadian former professional ice hockey player who played in the World Hockey Association (WHA). Drafted in the fifth round of the 1973 NHL Amateur Draft by the St. Louis Blues, Laing opted to play in the WHA after being selected by the Alberta Oilers in the fourth round of the 1973 WHA Amateur Draft. He played parts of two WHA seasons for the Edmonton Oilers.

He is also the father of former professional hockey player Quintin Laing.

== Career statistics ==
			Regular season					Playoffs
Season	Team	League	GP	G	A	Pts	PIM	GP	G	A	Pts	PIM
1971–72	Saskatoon Blades	WCHL	59	12	21	33	62	—	—	—	—	—
1972–73	Saskatoon Blades	WCHL	62	19	34	53	49	—	—	—	—	—
1973–74	Winston-Salem Polar Twins	SHL-Sr.	72	13	30	43	111	7	0	1	1	0
1974–75	Edmonton Oilers	WHA	42	2	4	6	32	—	—	—	—	—
1974–75	Winston-Salem Polar Twins	SHL-Sr.	30	21	24	45	74	—	—	—	—	—
1975–76	Edmonton Oilers	WHA	54	8	12	20	67	4	0	1	1	4
1975–76	Spokane Flyers	WIHL	14	4	2	6	25	—	—	—	—	—
WHA totals			96	10	16	26	99	4	0	1	1	4
