= Brian McKenzie (ice hockey) =

Ice Hockey player

- Born: March 16, 1951 (age 75) St. Catharines, Ontario, Canada
- Height: 5 ft 10 in (178 cm)
- Weight: 175 lb (79 kg; 12 st 7 lb)
- Position: Centre
- Shot: Left
- Played for: Pittsburgh Penguins; Edmonton Oilers; Indianapolis Racers
- NHL draft: 18th overall, 1971; Pittsburgh Penguins
- Playing career: 1971–1978

Brian Stewart McKenzie (born March 16, 1951) is a Canadian former professional ice hockey player. He played 6 games in the National Hockey League with the Pittsburgh Penguins during the 1971–72 season and 87 games in the World Hockey Association with the Edmonton Oilers and Indianapolis Racers during the 1973–74 and 1974–75 seasons.

== Career ==
McKenzie was drafted 18th overall by the Pittsburgh Penguins in the 1971 NHL Amateur Draft and played six games for the Penguins during the 1971–72 season. He also played in the World Hockey Association for the Edmonton Oilers and the Indianapolis Racers.

== Career statistics ==
=== Regular season and playoffs ===
| | | | Regular season | | | | | Playoffs |
| Season | Team | League | GP | G | A | Pts | PIM | GP | G | A | Pts | PIM |
|---|---|---|---|---|---|---|---|---|---|---|---|---|
| 1965–66 | St. Catharines Black Hawks | OHA | 14 | 0 | 1 | 1 | 4 | — | — | — | — | — |
| 1968–69 | St. Catharines Black Hawks | OHA | 54 | 10 | 21 | 31 | 70 | 18 | 5 | 5 | 10 | 29 |
| 1969–70 | St. Catharines Black Hawks | OHA | 53 | 17 | 41 | 58 | 128 | 10 | 3 | 4 | 7 | 20 |
| 1970–71 | St. Catharines Black Hawks | OHA | 60 | 39 | 85 | 124 | 108 | 15 | 3 | 17 | 20 | 10 |
| 1971–72 | Pittsburgh Penguins | NHL | 6 | 1 | 1 | 2 | 4 | — | — | — | — | — |
| 1971–72 | Hershey Bears | AHL | 66 | 15 | 13 | 28 | 92 | 4 | 0 | 0 | 0 | 0 |
| 1972–73 | Hershey Bears | AHL | 3 | 0 | 2 | 2 | 16 | — | — | — | — | — |
| 1972–73 | Omaha Knights | CHL | 64 | 16 | 36 | 52 | 71 | 9 | 5 | 4 | 9 | 28 |
| 1973–74 | Edmonton Oilers | WHA | 78 | 18 | 20 | 38 | 66 | 5 | 0 | 1 | 1 | 0 |
| 1974–75 | Indianapolis Racers | WHA | 9 | 1 | 0 | 1 | 6 | — | — | — | — | — |
| 1974–75 | Mohawk Valley Comets | NAHL | 28 | 37 | 65 | 37 | 4 | 0 | 5 | 5 | 2 |
| 1975–76 | Toledo Goaldiggers | IHL | 42 | 12 | 19 | 31 | 64 | 4 | 2 | 3 | 5 | 2 |
| 1975–76 | Mohawk Valley Comets | NAHL | 20 | 10 | 14 | 24 | 24 | — | — | — | — | — |
| 1976–77 | Toledo Goaldiggers | IHL | 77 | 32 | 58 | 90 | 85 | 19 | 12 | 6 | 18 | 22 |
| 1977–78 | Milwaukee Admirals | IHL | 15 | 2 | 9 | 11 | 6 | — | — | — | — | — |
| 1977–78 | Toledo Goaldiggers | IHL | 2 | 0 | 0 | 0 | 12 | — | — | — | — | — |
| WHA totals | | | 87 | 19 | 20 | 39 | 72 | 5 | 0 | 1 | 1 | 0 |
| NHL totals | | | 6 | 1 | 1 | 2 | 4 | — | — | — | — | — |
