= 1976–77 Austrian Hockey League season =

Austrian ice hockey season

The 1976–77 Austrian Hockey League season was the 47th season of the Austrian Hockey League, the top level of ice hockey in Austria. Seven teams participated in the league, and EC KAC won the championship.

== Regular season ==
	Team	GP	W	L	T	GF	GA	Pts
1.	EC KAC	24	18	3	3	-	-	39
2.	ATSE Graz	24	16	6	2	-	-	34
3.	ECS Innsbruck	24	16	8	0	-	-	32
4.	Wiener EV	24	10	13	1	-	-	21
5.	Kapfenberger SV	24	8	15	1	-	-	17
6.	VEU Feldkirch	24	8	15	1	-	-	17
7.	HC Salzburg	24	4	20	0	-	-	8

== Playoffs ==
=== Semifinals ===
- EC KAC - ECS Innsbruck 3:0 (9:1, 8:3, 6:1)
- ATSE Graz - Wiener EV 3:0 (4:2, 5:3, 5:2)

=== Final ===
- EC KAC - AYSE Graz 3:2 (6:3, 4:5 OT, 2:3, 2:1 OT, 4:2)
