= 1977–78 Austrian Hockey League season =

Austrian ice hockey season

The 1977–78 Austrian Hockey League season was the 48th season of the Austrian Hockey League, the top level of ice hockey in Austria. Eight teams participated in the league, and ATSE Graz won the championship.

== Regular season ==
	Team	GP	W	L	T	GF	GA	Pts
1.	EC KAC	28	20	5	3	164	89	43
2.	ATSE Graz	28	18	8	2	127	81	38
3.	HC Salzburg	28	16	11	1	122	115	33
4.	ECS Innsbruck	28	14	11	3	120	100	31
5.	VEU Feldkirch	28	10	12	5	75	118	25
6.	Kapfenberger SV	28	10	15	3	94	105	23
7.	Wiener EV	28	7	17	4	95	130	18
8.	EC VSV	28	4	19	5	88	148	13

== Playoffs ==
=== Semifinals ===
- EC KAC - HC Salzburg 3:0 (7:3, 9:4, 5:2)
- ATSE Graz - ECS Innsbruck 3:2 (5:4 OT, 2:1 OT, 4:5 SO, 2:3, 4:3)

=== Final ===
- EC KAC - ATSE Graz 1:3 (1:3, 7:0, 3:6, 3:6)
