= Howie Colborne =

Canadian ice hockey player

- Born: June 28, 1950 (age 75) Peace River, Alberta, Canada
- Height: 5 ft 11 in (180 cm)
- Weight: 185 lb (84 kg; 13 st 3 lb)
- Position: Left wing
- Shot: Left
- Played for: WHA; Edmonton Oilers; AHL; Boston Braves; SHL; Winston-Salem Polar Twins; Roanoke Valley Rebels; NAHL; Philadelphia Firebirds; Long Island Cougars
- WHA draft: Undrafted
- Playing career: 1973–1976

Howie Colborne (born June 28, 1950) is a Canadian former professional ice hockey player.

During the 1973–74 season, Colborne played two games in the World Hockey Association with the Edmonton Oilers. His professional career was predominantly with low-level minor teams in the Southern Hockey League and North American Hockey League, playing a combined 206 games, on four teams, over three seasons.

== Career statistics ==
=== Regular season and playoffs ===
			Regular season					Playoffs
Season	Team	League	GP	G	A	Pts	PIM	GP	G	A	Pts	PIM
1969-70	Red Deer Rustlers	AJHL	25	10	8	18	50	—	—	—	—	—
1973-74	Edmonton Oilers	WHA	2	0	0	0	0	—	—	—	—	—
1973-74	Boston Braves	AHL	4	0	3	3	0	—	—	—	—	—
1973-74	Winston-Salem Polar Twins	SHL	70	33	48	81	131	7	5	6	11	11
1974-75	Philadelphia Firebirds	NAHL	52	11	35	46	79	—	—	—	—	—
1974-75	Long Island Cougars	NAHL	21	9	12	21	51	11	5	4	9	36
1975-76	Roanoke Valley Rebels	SHL	63	20	37	57	88	6	1	2	3	12
1977-78	Drumheller Miners	ASHL	16	1	14	15	69	—	—	—	—	—
WHA totals			2	0	0	0	2	—	—	—	—	—
