= Jim Schraefel =

Canadian ice hockey player

- Born: August 23, 1948 (age 77) Dauphin, Manitoba, Canada
- Height: 6 ft 2 in (188 cm)
- Weight: 180 lb (82 kg; 12 st 12 lb)
- Position: Centre
- Shot: Left
- Played for: Edmonton Oilers (WHA)
- NHL draft: Undrafted
- Playing career: 1970–1974

James Schraefel (born August 23, 1948) is a Canadian former professional ice hockey player.

During the 1973–74 season, Schraefel played 34 games in the World Hockey Association with the Edmonton Oilers.

== Career statistics ==
=== Regular season and playoffs ===
			Regular season					Playoffs
Season	Team	League	GP	G	A	Pts	PIM	GP	G	A	Pts	PIM
1966–67	Edmonton Oil Kings	CMJHL	56	14	19	33	0	––	––	––	––	––
1967–68	Edmonton Oil Kings	WCJHL	58	35	47	82	22	––	––	––	––	––
1968–69	Edmonton Oil Kings	WCHL	47	15	39	54	16	––	––	––	––	––
1969–70	Edmonton Oil Kings	WCHL	Statistics Unavailable
1970–71	San Diego Gulls	WHL	64	10	12	22	2	6	0	1	1	2
1971–72	Tidewater Wings	AHL	9	0	1	1	––	––	––	––	––
1971–72	Fort Worth Wings	CHL	55	7	10	17	20	7	1	1	2	0
1972–73	San Diego Gulls	WHL	72	10	21	31	18	6	2	1	3	0
1973–74	Edmonton Oilers	WHA	34	1	1	2	0	5	0	3	3	0
WHA totals			34	1	1	2	0	5	0	3	3	0
