= Chris Worthy =

British-Canadian ice hockey player (1947–2007)

- Born: October 23, 1947; Bristol, England, GBR
- Died: August 2, 2007 (aged 59); Vancouver, British Columbia, Canada
- Height: 6 ft 0 in (183 cm)
- Weight: 180 lb (82 kg; 12 st 12 lb)
- Position: Goaltender
- Caught: Left
- Played for: Oakland Seals; California Golden Seals; Edmonton Oilers
- Playing career: 1968–1976

Christopher John Worthy (October 23, 1947 – August 2, 2007) was a British-born Canadian ice hockey player who played 81 games in the World Hockey Association and 26 games in the National Hockey League between 1968 and 1976 with the Edmonton Oilers and California Golden Seals.

Christopher John Worthy was born in Bristol, England, United Kingdom, but grew up in Ontario, Canada. He attended college at Harvard University. He died of pancreatic cancer at his home in Vancouver, British Columbia, Canada, at age 59, survived by Lesley, his wife of 41 years, and two sons.

== Career statistics ==
=== Regular season and playoffs ===
			Regular season									Playoffs
Season	Team	League	GP	W	L	T	MIN	GA	SO	GAA	SV%	GP	W	L	MIN	GA	SO	GAA	SV%
1965–66	Flin Flon Bombers	SJHL	53	—	—	—	3129	397	0	7.61	—	—	—	—	—	—	—	—	—
1966–67	Flin Flon Bombers	MJHL	44	40	4	0	2640	120	3	2.73	—	14	8	6	857	52	0	3.64	—
1967–68	Flin Flon Bombers	WCHL	60	47	8	5	3240	129	10	2.39	—	14	8	6	880	37	1	2.52	—
1968–69	Oakland Seals	NHL	14	4	7	2	775	54	0	4.18	.880	—	—	—	—	—	—	—	—
1969–70	Oakland Seals	NHL	1	0	1	0	60	5	0	5.00	.844	—	—	—	—	—	—	—	—
1969–70	Providence Reds	AHL	3	—	—	—	140	12	0	5.14	—	—	—	—	—	—	—	—	—
1969–70	Seattle Totems	WHL	31	—	—	—	1836	110	0	3.59	—	2	0	1	100	10	0	5.98	—
1970–71	California Golden Seals	NHL	11	1	3	1	474	39	0	4.94	.860	—	—	—	—	—	—	—	—
1971–72	Kansas City Blues	CHL	19	3	10	5	1069	73	0	4.09	—	—	—	—	—	—	—	—	—
1972–73	Denver Spurs	WHL	37	12	14	7	1929	131	0	4.07	.871	1	0	1	59	5	0	5.10	—
1973–74	Edmonton Oilers	WHA	29	11	12	1	1452	92	0	3.80	.894	3	1	1	146	8	0	3.29	—
1974–75	Edmonton Oilers	WHA	29	11	13	3	1660	99	1	3.58	.893	—	—	—	—	—	—	—	—
1975–76	Edmonton Oilers	WHA	24	5	14	0	1256	98	1	4.68	.862	1	0	1	60	7	0	7.00	—
WHA totals			81	27	39	4	4369	289	3	3.97	.885	4	1	2	206	15	0	4.37	—
NHL totals			26	5	11	3	1310	98	0	4.49	.871	—	—	—	—	—	—	—	—

== Awards and achievements ==
- MJHL First All-Star Team (1967)
- MJHL Top Goaltender Award (1967)
- Turnbull Cup MJHL Championship (1967)
- WCJHL First All-Star Team (1968)

== See also ==
- List of National Hockey League players from the United Kingdom
