= Wayne Zuk =

Canadian ice hockey player

- Born: October 29, 1949 (age 76) Prince Albert, SK, CAN
- Height: 5 ft 8 in (173 cm)
- Weight: 160 lb (73 kg; 11 st 6 lb)
- Position: Centre
- Shot: Right
- Played for: WHA; Edmonton Oilers; IHL; Toledo Blades; Flint Generals; Saginaw Gears; SHL; Greensboro Generals
- Playing career: 1969–1977

Wayne Zuk (born October 29, 1949) is a Canadian former professional ice hockey player. During the 1973–74 season, Zuk played 2 games in the World Hockey Association with the Alberta Oilers.

Zuk also played in the International Hockey League, having stints with the Toledo Blades, Flint Generals, and the Saginaw Gears and the Southern Hockey League, playing with the Greensboro Generals during the 1974-75 season. He won the Gary F. Longman Memorial Trophy as the IHL's most outstanding first-year player as voted on by the league's coaches following the 1969-70 season.

== Career statistics ==
=== Regular season and playoffs ===
			Regular season					Playoffs
Season	Team	League	GP	G	A	Pts	PIM	GP	G	A	Pts	PIM
1966–67	Edmonton Western Movers	AJHL	Statistics Unavailable
1967–68	Red Deer Rustlers	AJHL	Statistics Unavailable
1968–69	Red Deer Rustlers	AJHL	––	40	39	79	45	—	—	—	—	—
1969–70	Toledo Blades	IHL	72	41	27	68	40	3	0	2	2	4
1970–71	Toledo–Flint	IHL	67	24	33	57	29	7	3	2	5	4
1971–72	Flint Generals	IHL	70	29	35	64	42	4	2	2	4	0
1972–73	Flint Generals	IHL	74	51	61	112	83	4	0	1	1	12
1973–74	Flint Generals	IHL	74	37	46	83	48	7	3	2	5	8
1973–74	Edmonton Oilers	WHA	2	0	0	0	0	—	—	—	—	—
1974–75	Flint Generals	IHL	10	5	10	15	2	5	0	3	3	0
1974–75	Greensboro Generals	SHL	64	35	49	84	45	—	—	—	—	—
1975–76	Flint Generals	IHL	47	14	25	39	50	—	—	—	—	—
1975–76	Saginaw Gears	IHL	27	15	14	29	28	12	5	4	9	8
1976–77	Saginaw Gears	IHL	70	24	39	63	29	19	7	9	16	12
WHA totals			2	0	0	0	0	—	—	—	—	—
