= Gary Cunningham (ice hockey) =

Canadian ice hockey player

- Born: August 28, 1950 (age 75) Welland, Ontario, Canada
- Height: 6 ft 0 in (183 cm)
- Weight: 174 lb (79 kg; 12 st 6 lb)
- Position: Defence
- Shot: Left
- Played for: Edmonton Oilers (WHA)
- NHL draft: 99th overall, 1970; Philadelphia Flyers
- Playing career: 1970–1974

Gary Cunningham (born August 28, 1950) is a Canadian retired professional ice hockey player. He played two games in the WHA with the Edmonton Oilers during the 1973–74 season.

== Career statistics ==
=== Regular season and playoffs ===
| | | | Regular season | | | | | Playoffs |
| Season | Team | League | GP | G | A | Pts | PIM | GP | G | A | Pts | PIM |
|---|---|---|---|---|---|---|---|---|---|---|---|---|
| 1968–69 | St. Catharines Black Hawks | OHA | 51 | 4 | 6 | 10 | 22 | — | — | — | — | — |
| 1969–70 | St. Catharines Black Hawks | OHA | 51 | 2 | 9 | 11 | 109 | — | — | — | — | — |
| 1970–71 | Quebec Aces | AHL | 45 | 1 | 4 | 5 | 59 | 1 | 0 | 0 | 0 | 0 |
| 1971–72 | Richmond Robins | AHL | 3 | 0 | 1 | 1 | 2 | — | — | — | — | — |
| 1971–72 | Jersey Devils | EHL | 58 | 6 | 18 | 24 | 74 | — | — | — | — | — |
| 1972–73 | Jersey–Cape Cod | EHL | 69 | 22 | 17 | 39 | 80 | 8 | 1 | 2 | 3 | 0 |
| 1973–74 | Edmonton Oilers | WHA | 2 | 0 | 0 | 0 | 0 | — | — | — | — | — |
| 1973–74 | Winston–Salem Polar Twins | SHL | 64 | 5 | 9 | 14 | 33 | 7 | 0 | 0 | 0 | 2 |
| WHA totals | | | 2 | 0 | 0 | 0 | 2 | — | — | — | — | — |
