= WHA general player draft =

The World Hockey Association general player draft was held over the course of two days, February 12 and 13, 1972, in Anaheim, California. The purpose of the draft was to establish an orderly process through which WHA teams would stock their rosters by the beginning of their inaugural season later that year. As such, players from other professional teams (notably National Hockey League clubs) were eligible to be drafted. The draftees were not under any legal obligation to sign with the drafting WHA club: other WHA clubs were prevented from negotiating with the players who had been drafted.

The draft was held in two parts: a "preliminary" round in which teams made so-called "priority" selections, and the rounds of the "general draft" which followed. For the preliminary round which was held in November 1971, each team wrote four names on a piece of paper, which were then submitted and announced prior to the start of the general draft. The priority selections were the most sought after players, consisting mostly of NHL veterans and highly touted prospects.

Twelve teams took part in the draft: the Calgary Broncos, Chicago Cougars, Dayton Aeros, Edmonton Oil Kings, Los Angeles Sharks, Miami Screaming Eagles, Minnesota Fighting Saints, New England Whalers, Winnipeg Jets, and three then-unnamed franchises based in New York (later the Raiders), Ontario (later the Ottawa Nationals) and Quebec City (later the Nordiques).

The Broncos folded within months, before the beginning of the season, and the negotiating rights to their picks were transferred to a new club: the Cleveland Crusaders. Similarly the Screaming Eagles never took to the ice, and their picks transferred to the Philadelphia Blazers. The Dayton Aeros moved to Houston before the playing season, and the Oil Kings changed their name to Alberta Oilers with the intent of splitting home games between Edmonton and Calgary.

== Preliminary round ==
=== Calgary Broncos ===
Player	Position	Nationality	Team	League
Barry Gibbs	D	Canada	Minnesota North Stars	NHL
Jim Harrison	C	Canada	Toronto Maple Leafs	NHL
Dale Hoganson	D	Canada	Montreal Canadiens	NHL
Jack Norris	G	Canada	Seattle Totems	WHL

=== Chicago Cougars ===
Player	Position	Nationality	Team	League
Stan Mikita	C	Canada	Chicago Black Hawks	NHL
Jerry Korab	D	Canada	Chicago Black Hawks	NHL
Jim McKenny	D	Canada	Toronto Maple Leafs	NHL
Gary Smith	G	Canada	Chicago Black Hawks	NHL

=== Dayton Aeros ===
Player	Position	Nationality	Team	League
Guy Trottier	RW	Canada	Toronto Maple Leafs	NHL
Andre Hinse	LW	Canada	Phoenix Roadrunners	WHL
Larry Lund	C	Canada	Phoenix Roadrunners	WHL
Wayne Rutledge	G	Canada	Salt Lake Golden Eagles	WHL

=== Alberta Oilers ===
Player	Position	Nationality	Team	League
Norm Ullman	C	Canada	Toronto Maple Leafs	NHL
Bobby Clarke	C	Canada	Philadelphia Flyers	NHL
Bruce MacGregor	C	Canada	New York Rangers	NHL
Phil Myre	G	Canada	Montreal Canadiens	NHL

=== Los Angeles Sharks ===
Player	Position	Nationality	Team	League
Ken Dryden	G	Canada	Montreal Canadiens	NHL
Gilbert Perreault	C	Canada	Buffalo Sabres	NHL
Matt Ravlich	D	Canada	Boston Bruins	NHL
Steve Sutherland	LW	Canada	Port Huron Wings	IHL

=== Miami Screaming Eagles ===
Player	Position	Nationality	Team	League
Bernie Parent	G	Canada	Toronto Maple Leafs	NHL
Jude Drouin	C	Canada	Minnesota North Stars	NHL
Derek Sanderson	C	Canada	Boston Bruins	NHL
Bill White	D	Canada	Chicago Black Hawks	NHL

=== Minnesota Fighting Saints ===
Player	Position	Nationality	Team	League
Pete Mahovlich	LW	Canada	Montreal Canadiens	NHL
Mike Curran	G	United States	United States Olympic team	
Bill Goldsworthy	RW	Canada	Minnesota North Stars	NHL
Dale Tallon	D	Canada	Vancouver Canucks	NHL

=== New England Whalers ===
Player	Position	Nationality	Team	League
Bobby Sheehan	C	United States	California Golden Seals	NHL
Eddie Johnston	G	Canada	Boston Bruins	NHL
Rick Ley	D	Canada	Toronto Maple Leafs	NHL
Larry Pleau	C	United States	Montreal Canadiens	NHL

=== New York ===
Player	Position	Nationality	Team	League
Gerry Desjardins	G	Canada	Chicago Black Hawks	NHL
Dave Gardner	C	Canada	Toronto Marlboros	OHA
Billy Harris	RW	Canada	Toronto Marlboros	OHA
Steve Shutt	LW	Canada	Toronto Marlboros	OHA

=== Ontario ===
Player	Position	Nationality	Team	League
Doug Favell	G	Canada	Philadelphia Flyers	NHL
Dave Keon	C	Canada	Toronto Maple Leafs	NHL
Brad Park	D	Canada	New York Rangers	NHL
Eddie Shack	LW	Canada	Buffalo Sabres	NHL

=== Quebec City ===
Player	Position	Nationality	Team	League
Gilles Villemure	G	Canada	New York Rangers	NHL
Guy Lapointe	D	Canada	Montreal Canadiens	NHL
Jacques Lemaire	F	Canada	Montreal Canadiens	NHL
John McKenzie	RW	Canada	Boston Bruins	NHL

=== Winnipeg Jets ===
Player	Position	Nationality	Team	League
Bobby Hull	LW	Canada	Chicago Black Hawks	NHL
Ted Green	D	Canada	Boston Bruins	NHL
Ted Irvine	LW	Canada	New York Rangers	NHL
Ernie Wakely	G	Canada	St. Louis Blues	NHL

== Regular rounds ==
=== Calgary Broncos ===
==== Rounds 1–10 ====
Player	Position	Nationality	Team	League
Steve Carlyle	D	Canada	University of Alberta Golden Bears	CIAU
Ron Homenuke	F	Canada	Calgary Centennials	WCHL
Ross Lonsberry	LW	Canada	Philadelphia Flyers	NHL
Jim McMasters	F	Canada	Calgary Centennials	WCHL
Morris Mott	RW	Canada	Queen's University Golden Gaels	CIAU
Gerry Pinder	RW	Canada	California Golden Seals	NHL
Larry Romanchych	C	Canada	Dallas Black Hawks	CHL
Gregg Sheppard	C	Canada	Oklahoma City Blazers	CHL
Brian Walker	C	Canada	Calgary Centennials	WCHL
Jimmy Watson	D	Canada	Calgary Centennials	WCHL

==== Rounds 11–20 ====
Player	Position	Nationality	Team	League
Ron Boehm	LW	Canada	Boston Braves	AHL
Anatoli Firsov	F	Soviet Union	HC CSKA Moscow	USSR
Jozef Golonka	F	Czechoslovakia	SC Riessersee	Bundesliga
Lorne Henning	C	Canada	New Westminster Bruins	WCHL
Skip Krake	C	Canada	Salt Lake Golden Eagles	WHL
Bernie Lukowich	F	Canada	New Westminster Bruins	WCHL
Ray Martyniuk	G	Canada	Columbus Golden Seals	IHL
Randy Rota	LW	Canada	Nova Scotia Voyageurs	AHL
Dallas Smith	D	Canada	Boston Bruins	NHL
Stan Weir	C	Canada	Medicine Hat Tigers	WCHL

==== Rounds 21–50 ====
Player	Position	Nationality	Team	League
Jeff Ablett	LW	Canada	Medicine Hat Tigers	WCHL
Wayne Bell	G	Canada	Omaha Knights	CHL
Dwight Bialowas	D	Canada	Regina Pats	WCHL
Yury Blinov	F	Soviet Union	CSKA Moscow	USSR
Lyle Bradley	C	Canada	Salt Lake Golden Eagles	WHL
Gary Braun	D	Canada	Toledo Hornets	IHL
Ken Brown	G	Canada	Dallas Black Hawks	CHL
Jim Cardiff	D	Canada	San Diego Gulls	WHL
Valeri Kharlamov	LW	Soviet Union	CSKA Moscow	USSR
Dave Dunn	D	Canada	Seattle Totems	WHL
Ed Dyck	G	Canada	Vancouver Canucks	NHL
Grant Erickson	LW	Canada	Cleveland Barons	AHL
Jan Eysselt		Czechoslovakia		
Gerry Hart	D	Canada	Fort Worth Wings	CHL
Petr Hejma	F	Czechoslovakia/West Germany	Düsseldorfer EG	Bundesliga
Ted Hodgson	RW	Canada	Salt Lake Golden Eagles	WHL
Doug Horbul	LW	Canada	Calgary Centennials	WCHL
Josef Horesovsky	D	Czechoslovakia		
Ken Ireland	C	Canada	New Westminster Bruins	WCHL
Darrel Knibbs	C	Canada	Muskegon Mohawks	IHL
Al McDonough	RW	Canada	Pittsburgh Penguins	NHL
Ray McKay	D	Canada	Cincinnati Swords	AHL
Murray McNeil	LW	Canada	Cleveland Barons	AHL
Ernie Moser	RW	Canada	Nelson Maple Leafs	WIHL
Vaclav Nedomansky	C	Czechoslovakia	HC Slovan Bratislava	Czech.
Rod Norrish	LW	Canada	Cleveland Barons	AHL
Veli-Pekka Ketola	C	Finland	Assat Pori	SM-sarja
Darryl Sittler	C	Canada	Toronto Maple Leafs	NHL
George Swarbrick	RW	Canada	San Diego Gulls	WHL
Joe Watson	D	Canada	Philadelphia Flyers	NHL

==== Rounds 51–70 ====
Player	Position	Nationality	Team	League
Grant Clay	G	Canada	University of Manitoba	CIAU
Wayne Doll	G	Canada	Long Island Ducks	EHL
Len Frig	D	Canada	Dallas Black Hawks	CHL
Ken Gustafson	C	Canada	Spokane Jets	WIHL
George Hill	C	Canada	Calgary Stampeders	PrHL
Les Jackson	LW	Canada	New Westminster Bruins	WCHL
Marshall Johnston	RW	Canada	California Golden Seals	NHL
Gunnar Lindquist				
Barrie Meissner	LW	Canada	Omaha Knights	CHL
Peter Muller				
Wayne Morusyk	D	Canada	Oklahoma City Blazers	CHL
Tom Pinder	F	Canada	Saskatoon Blades	WCHL
Al Rycroft	C	Canada	Fort Wayne Komets	IHL
Alois Schloder	RW	West Germany	EV Landshut	Germany
Jim Shaw	G	Canada	Portland Buckaroos	WHL
Ed Sidebottom	D	Canada	Charlotte Checkers	EHL
Karl Swetberge				
Ron Willy	C	Canada	Saskatoon Quakers	PrHL
Richard Wilson	D	Canada	University of North Dakota	NCAA
Jerry Wright	C	Canada	Roanoke Valley Rebels	EHL

==== Rounds 71+ ====
Player	Position	Nationality	Team	League
Dave Amadio	D	Canada	Salt Lake Golden Eagles	WHL
Leigh Bannister	C	Canada	Flint Generals	IHL
Dave Bonter	LW	Canada	Dayton Gems	IHL
Bill Hay	C	Canada	Retired	
Rob Heaney	D	Canada	Dayton Gems	IHL
Herb Howdle	D	Canada	Oklahoma City Blazers	CHL
Aleksander Maltsev	C	Soviet Union	HC Dynamo Moscow	USSR
Darwin Mott	LW	Canada	Michigan Tech	NCAA
Vladimir Petrov	C	Soviet Union	HC CSKA Moscow	USSR
Morris Stefaniw	C	Canada	Providence Reds	AHL
Garry Swain	C	Canada	Fort Wayne Komets	IHL
