= 1968–69 WCHL season =

Junior ice hockey season

- League: Western Hockey League
- Sport: Ice hockey
- Teams: 8

Regular season
- Season champions: Flin Flon Bombers (2)
- Season MVP: Bobby Clarke (Flin Flon Bombers)
- Top scorer: Bobby Clarke (Flin Flon Bombers)

Playoffs
- Finals champions: Flin Flon Bombers (1)
- Runners-up: Edmonton Oil Kings

WHL seasons
- 1967–68 1969–70

The 1968–69 WCHL season was the third season of the Western Canada Hockey League (WCHL), featuring eight teams and a 60-game regular season. The Flin Flon Bombers topped the season's standings with 47 wins, and in the playoffs defeated the Edmonton Oil Kings to win the club's first President's Cup championship. The Bombers advanced to a national series organized by the Canadian Hockey Association to rival the Memorial Cup. In the series the Bombers defeated the St. Thomas Barons from the Western Ontario Junior A Hockey League.

== League business ==
The Western Canada Junior Hockey League changed its name to the Western Canada Hockey League on June 8, 1968, and broke away from the Canadian Amateur Hockey Association (CAHA), affiliating instead with the fledgling rival Canadian Hockey Association (CHA) over disputes about age limits. Ron Butlin was named president of both the WCHL and the CHA. The league changed its name since it no longer conformed to CAHA's age limit of 19, but rather raised its age limit to 21. The break-up made the WCHL ineligible to compete for the Memorial Cup.

Due to the dispute with CAHA, the Regina Pats chose to withdraw from the WCHL and helped revive Saskatchewan Junior Hockey League (SJHL) under the jurisdiction of the Saskatchewan Amateur Hockey Association. Butlin expected the WCHL to go ahead with the remaining ten teams separated into two divisions, but actively searched for prospective owners for a team in Regina to replace the Pats. In fact, the Pats attempted to lure the Saskatoon Blades to join the SJHL, but the Saskatoon team declined. However, the Weyburn Red Wings, weary of the growing costs of an expanding WCHL, opted to follow the Pats. Then, on July 20, 1968, Butlin suspended the Moose Jaw Canucks for failure to fulfill financial obligations to the league. The Canucks opted to join the SJHL as well. This left the WCHL down to eight teams by the start of the 1968–69 season.

The WCHL sought payments from the National Hockey League (NHL) as per the existing NHL amateur draft agreement in which CAHA members were paid for developing future professional players.

In February 1969, the Dauphin Kings of the Manitoba Junior Hockey League challenged the validity of the Canadian Hockey Association contract when it signed Butch Goring from the Winnipeg Jets. Merv Haney also departed the Jets for the Kings, and Butlin stated that the WCHL would seek a court injunction to prevent both from playing for Dauphin and take legal action to seek damages.

== Team changes ==
- The Regina Pats withdraw from the league and join the Saskatchewan Junior Hockey League.
- The Weyburn Red Wings withdraw from the league and join the Saskatchewan Junior Hockey League.
- The league suspended the Moose Jaw Canucks for failure to fulfill financial obligations.

== Regular season ==
The WCHL was split into two four-team divisions with an interlocking season schedule.

=== Final standings ===
East Division
Pos	Team	Pld	W	L	T	GF	GA	Pts
1	Flin Flon Bombers	60	47	13	0	343	159	94
2	Estevan Bruins	60	40	20	0	294	195	80
3	Winnipeg Jets	60	29	31	0	290	268	58
4	Brandon Wheat Kings	60	18	40	2	224	350	38

West Division
Pos	Team	Pld	W	L	T	GF	GA	Pts
1	Edmonton Oil Kings	60	33	25	2	229	206	68
2	Calgary Centennials	60	31	28	1	253	236	63
3	Saskatoon Blades	60	24	35	1	195	271	49
4	Swift Current Broncos	60	14	44	2	186	329	30

=== Scoring leaders ===
Note: GP = Games played; G = Goals; A = Assists; Pts = Points; PIM = Penalties in minutes

Player	Team	GP	G	A	Pts	PIM
Bobby Clarke	Flin Flon Bombers	58	51	86	137	123
Greg Polis	Estevan Bruins	60	40	85	125	94
Tom Serviss	Calgary Centennials	60	24	79	103	60
Bob Liddington	Calgary Centennials	60	58	33	91	26
Ernie Moser	Estevan Bruins	56	46	40	86	41
Brian Marchinko	Flin Flon Bombers	60	41	45	86	96
Gregg Sheppard	Estevan Bruins	54	42	42	84	33
Doug Smith	Winnipeg Jets	47	31	52	83	130
Jim Nichols	Saskatoon Blades	60	37	35	72	16
Steve Andrascik	Flin Flon Bombers	50	32	36	68	142
Wayne Hawrysh	Flin Flon Bombers	58	31	37	68	187

== League playoffs ==
Butlin arranged for the WCHL to compete in an east-west national championship under the auspices of the Canadian Hockey Association against the champions of the Western Ontario Junior A Hockey League. WCHL playoffs saw the first team to secure eight points winning their series.

=== Quarterfinals ===
- Calgary defeated Swift Current 8 points to 0
- Edmonton defeated Saskatoon 8 points to 0
- Estevan defeated Brandon 8 points to 2
- Flin Flon defeated Winnipeg 9 points to 5

=== Semifinals ===
- Flin Flon defeated Estevan 9 points to 1
- Edmonton defeated Calgary 9 points to 5

=== Finals ===
- Flin Flon defeated Edmonton 8 points to 4

== National championship ==
The national final was scheduled to begin April 25, pitting the WCHL champion Flin Flon Bombers against the Western Ontario Junior A Hockey League champion St. Thomas Barons. The teams were to compete for the Father Athol Murray Trophy. The series was arranged as a best-of-seven series to begin in St. Thomas, Ontario. The series would be the first Canadian national junior hockey championship not under the jurisdiction of CAHA.

The Barons ultimately withdrew from the championship series during the fourth game, played at the Whitney Forum in Flin Flon on May 5. The team left after an on-ice brawl during the second period. The referee defaulted the game to the Bombers, who were leading by a 4–0 score at the time. The Bombers led the series three games to one after the default win. Game five was scheduled for May 7 in Flin Flon, and games six and seven would have been in St. Thomas if necessary.

The Barons were escorted from the arena to their hotel by the Royal Canadian Mounted Police, and abandoned the series, claiming it was in the interest of player safety. The team departed for St. Thomas on May 6. The Canadian Press described the Barons as being over-matched in the series and not up to the calibre of WCHL teams. On May 7, Butlin awarded the series and the championship to the Flin Flon Bombers.

== All-star game ==
The 1968–69 WCHL all-star game was held in Flin Flon, Manitoba, with the WCHL All-stars and Flin Flon Bombers playing to a 4–4 draw before a crowd of 2,100.

== Awards ==
Most Valuable Player: Bobby Clarke, Flin Flon Bombers
Top Scorer: Bobby Clarke, Flin Flon Bombers
Most Sportsmanlike Player: Bob Liddington, Calgary Centennials
Defenseman of the Year: Dale Hoganson, Estevan Bruins
Rookie of the Year: Ron Williams, Edmonton Oil Kings
Goaltender of the Year: Ray Martyniuk, Flin Flon Bombers
Regular Season Champions: Flin Flon Bombers

== All-star team ==
- Goaltender: Ray Martyniuk, Flin Flon Bombers
- Defenceman: Dale Hoganson, Estevan Bruins
- Defenceman: Herb Howdle, Estevan Bruins
- Centerman: Bobby Clarke, Flin Flon Bombers
- Left winger: Greg Polis, Estevan Bruins
- Right winger: Reggie Leach, Flin Flon Bombers

== See also ==
- 1968 in sports
- 1969 in sports

Preceded by 1967–68 WCJHL season	WHL seasons	Succeeded by 1969–70 WCHL season
