= Canadian Hockey Association (1968–1970) =

Junior ice hockey governing body

- Merged into: Canadian Amateur Hockey Association
- Formation: June 8, 1968
- Founded at: Edmonton, Alberta
- Dissolved: June 24, 1970
- Members: Western Canada Hockey League; Western Ontario Junior Hockey League
- President: Ron Butlin
- Vice-president: Frank Basso

The Canadian Hockey Association (CHA) was a junior ice hockey governing body in Canada from 1968 to 1970. It was formed when the Western Canada Hockey League (WCHL) broke away from the Canadian Amateur Hockey Association (CAHA), due to disagreements with the CAHA and the National Hockey League (NHL) establishing the NHL Amateur Draft in 1967. Ron Butlin became president of both the CHA and the WCHL with the objective of the getting a better financial deal for teams in Western Canada which had greater expenses than teams in Eastern Canada, and to fight the age limit on players imposed by the NHL. Butlin was also opposed to the CAHA structure of elected officials who determined hockey policy, rather than representation by team owners and operators of hockey businesses. The CHA added the Western Ontario Junior Hockey League (WOJHL) to its ranks in opposition to how hockey was controlled. The WOJHL was denied the financially desirable junior hockey A-level status by the Ontario Hockey Association despite being based in the industrialized Southwestern Ontario region, and was discontent with losing its best players annually to other leagues in Ontario.

The CHA experienced growing pains during its existence, and was unsuccessful in expanding into Northern Ontario and British Columbia. Its attempt to establish an east-west national championship in competition with the Memorial Cup and the CAHA, ended in a default win by the Flin Flon Bombers when the St. Thomas Barons abandoned the series after an on-ice brawl. The CHA and CAHA also competed for the use of on-ice officials, had disagreements over civil law contracts for players, and saw legal action for the WCHL to receive financial compensation from the NHL Amateur Draft. The WCHL signed a two-year agreement with the CAHA in 1970, which gained direct representation on the CAHA junior council, recognition as a top tier league in Canada, the ability to select players from lower-tier leagues, automatic qualification for the Memorial Cup final, and increased financial compensation from the NHL. The WCHL conceded to the NHL's age limit and the CAHA agreed to distribute outstanding draft money. Once the WCHL rejoined the CAHA, the CHA was subsequently phased out and the WOJHL was replaced by the Southern Ontario Junior A Hockey League in 1970.

== Background ==
In August 1966, the Canadian Amateur Hockey Association (CAHA) and the National Hockey League (NHL) announced a new five-year agreement effective July 1, 1967. The direct sponsorship of junior ice hockey teams by the NHL was to be phased out in the upcoming year, and junior-aged players would no longer be required to sign a contract connecting them to an NHL team. Players became eligible for the NHL Amateur Draft once they reached their 20th birthday, and the NHL agreed to pay development fees to the CAHA for the drafted players.

Junior teams in Western Canada disagreed with the changes, and wanted the age limit to be 21, and increased financial compensation for loss of talent to professional teams and since their travel costs were greater than teams in Eastern Canada. The dissenting teams broke away from the CAHA and formed the independent Canadian Major Junior Hockey League (CMJHL). The league played the 1966–67 CMJHL season outside of CAHA jurisdiction and its teams were ineligible to compete for the Memorial Cup.

The CMJHL negotiated a peace treaty and operated the 1967–68 season under the CAHA, and renamed itself to the Western Canada Junior Hockey League (WCJHL). In advance of the 1968–69 season, the league announced it would use an age limit of 21 in defiance of the CAHA and NHL agreement. The WCJHL stopped short of declaring independence from the CAHA, and claimed that the lower age limit would decrease its talent pool and negatively affect ticket sales. In response, the CAHA suspended the league and its players.

== Formation ==
On June 8, 1968, the WCJHL changed its name to the Western Canada Hockey League (WCHL), and affiliated with the new Canadian Hockey Association (CHA) as a national governing body in opposition to the CAHA. Ron Butlin was named president of both organizations, which raised their age limit to 21. Butlin stated other leagues and teams were welcome to join the CHA, but the Regina Pats chose to leave the WCHL and remain with the CAHA.

Butlin was opposed to the CAHA structure of elected officials who determined hockey policy but were not connected to a team. The board of governors for the CHA was composed entirely by owners of its teams. Butlin stated the main objective of the CHA was to seek better financial return for their teams' efforts. He claimed it cost a team C$1,700 per year to develop a player, and felt $3,000 was too little value for a drafted player who took several years to develop. He also wanted to see more money given to teams for travel expenses to the Memorial Cup final. He also claimed that the National Fitness Council wanted a different organization to run junior hockey in Canada, and planned to present a brief to the council for an operational grant.

Butlin looked to expand the CHA eastward, and targeted the Western Ontario Junior Hockey League (WOJHL). The league had previously been denied the financially desirable junior hockey A-level status by the Ontario Hockey Association (OHA), despite being based in the industrialized Southwestern Ontario region with high per capita salaries. He made a 20-minute presentation to the league at a meeting in Sarnia, and convinced five teams from the league to join the CHA, instead of remaining a B-level league and lose its best players annually to other leagues in the OHA. WOJHL president Frank Basso assumed the vice-president role of the CHA, and targeted the NHL and other groups which he felt had lowered the age limit to profit from junior players. Butlin had also courted the Border Cities Junior Hockey League in Southwestern Ontario, but the league decided against joining the CHA due to fears of being blacklisted by the NHL. The Canadian Press reported that the Northern Ontario Junior Hockey League had met with Butlin, and that he attempted to get the British Columbia Junior Hockey League to join the CHA after the league was outwardly critical of the age limits and development fee changes by the CAHA.

Butlin stated that the WCHL would abide by the NHL Amateur Draft agreement with the CAHA, and expected to receive the corresponding development payments for its players. NHL president Clarence Campbell responded that the NHL would not do business with the CHA or the WCHL, and reiterated support for the CAHA. The NHL did not want to get involved with players who had contracts to CHA teams due to potential lawsuits, and had no intention of promoting a relationship with the CHA. Butlin claimed that CHA team had no issue signing players to contracts despite being shunned by the NHL. A month later, Campbell stated that any player registered with the CHA would need to end his contract before an NHL team would negotiate with him, and that the NHL had no intent to make development payments to the CHA.

== 1968–69 season ==
The CHA-CAHA dispute continued into the 1968–69 season. Butlin stated that the CHA was contemplating expansion into minor ice hockey, and felt that working on junior ice hockey and lower levels was a way to "change the hockey pattern in Canada". The CAHA refused requests to have WCHL teams to play exhibition games against the Canada men's national ice hockey team, and also threatened to suspended on-ice officials for refereeing games under CHA jurisdiction.

In October 1968, CAHA executive director Gordon Juckes released the disbursement of development payments from the 1968 NHL Amateur Draft. The statement omitted payments for ten players drafted from the WCHL while the league was under CAHA jurisdiction. Eight of the ten players were active on four teams under the CHA during the 1968–69 season. The CAHA refused to issue the payments as it considered all teams under the CHA jurisdiction to be defunct when they did not renew allegiance with the CAHA. In January 1969, Butlin announced legal action against the CAHA to seek development payments from the NHL, which totaled $13,200 to the four teams in question.

Teams under CAHA jurisdiction were given a deadline of November 30 to add players to their rosters who had departed for the CHA, and teams in Eastern Canada wanted to test the legality of the contract used by the CHA. The Winnipeg Free Press speculated the action would make players and parents hesitant of signing such contracts, and any pending legal action by the CHA might have a negative impact on its future. On November 4, Butlin stated that he would take legal action against the Quebec Amateur Hockey Association, the Quebec Junior Hockey League and its team from Sorel, for using two players who were under contract to the Winnipeg Jets. Later in November, he chose not to test the CHA's contract in court due to differences in civil law in Quebec compared to the rest of Canada. The CHA contract was tested again in February 1969, when the Manitoba Junior Hockey League gave permission for the Dauphin Kings to use Butch Goring, who had been signed by the Winnipeg Jets. Merv Haney also departed the Jets for the Dauphin Kings. Butlin stated that the WCHL would seek a court injunction to prevent both from playing, and that the CHA would seek damages against the Dauphin Kings and the Manitoba Amateur Hockey Association.

Teams in the WOJHL experienced double the operating costs at the junior A-level in the CHA, and were unable to generate subsidiary income through raffles due to regulations in Ontario. Despite the challenges, league president Frank Basso felt that the talent level had improved and would be at the same calibre as the OHA by the next season. He stated that league attendance figures justified the marketing efforts, and a desire to expand to eight teams for the 1969–70 season. Cities in Southwestern Ontario that expressed interest in joining the league included Stratford, Windsor and Woodstock; and Basso was actively negotiating with teams from Northern Ontario. Butlin expected the WCHL to expand to British Columbia for the next season, and mentioned that Vancouver was actively scouting for players and he also wanted teams in Victoria and New Westminster. He hoped for at least three teams in each of the provinces in Western Canada, and eventually wanted to see a junior league which spanned across Canada.

=== National championship ===
The Flin Flon Bombers from the WCHL and the St. Thomas Barons from the WOJHL were the respective league champions, and met in the CHA east-west national final for the Father Athol Murray Trophy. It was arranged as a best-of-seven series to begin in St. Thomas, Ontario. The series was the first Canadian national junior ice hockey championship not under the jurisdiction of the CAHA. Butlin also issued a challenge to the CAHA to have the 1969 Memorial Cup champion play against the CHA champion.

During the fourth game of the series played on May 5 at the Whitney Forum in Flin Flon, the Barons refused to continue after an on-ice brawl during the second period. The game was awarded to the Bombers who then led the series 3–1 after four games played. The Barons abandoned the series in the interest of player safety, and departed for St. Thomas despite a scheduled game on May 7 in Flin Flon.

The Canadian Press described the Barons as being over-matched in the series and were not up to the calibre of the Bombers of the WCHL. Butlin threatened that CHA would seize the team's assets if the Barons did not play game five, stating that the series cost $10,000 to $12,000 to operate. He later awarded the series to the Bombers and suspended the Barons, and stated any money received from the series would go to cover expenses. The CHA later agreed not to suspend the team, and instead the WOJHL fined the Barons $700 and suspended the coach and manager for one year.

== Off-season discussions ==
The CHA and a Government of Canada task force on amateur sport both called for changes in the structure of the CAHA, and for better representation and voice for its members. On May 20, 1969, CAHA president Earl Dawson released a restructuring proposal which would implement three separate councils for minor ice hockey, junior ice hockey, and senior ice hockey, to be composed of hockey businessmen and team operators. The CHA and the CAHA met to discuss reuniting, but did not agree on the age limit which was tied to the financial support from the NHL for CAHA development and administration costs. The two sides still disagreed on draft payments from 1968, and legal action on the matter was scheduled to appear before the Alberta Supreme Court in August 1969.

On July 30, Butlin and Dawson announced a tentative agreement where the WCHL would rejoin the CAHA, and could use up to five over-age players in the first year. It was expected that the CHA would be phased out, and the WOJHL would continue separate negotiations with the OHA. Other unresolved demands by the WCHL included the right to place a club anywhere in Western Canada without seeking CAHA approval, and to be allowed to take one player from a lower-level junior club in Canada to play in the WCHL. As of September 16, 1969, the agreement was not yet approved by the CAHA.

== 1969–70 season ==
On October 4, Butlin stated the WCHL would start its season outside of CAHA jurisdiction. The WCHL demanded that the development fees be paid immediately, whereas the CAHA reportedly wanted to hold the money as a bond until May 1970. Butlin also wanted a joint meeting with the NHL and the CAHA, and threatened to exercise the option clause in its contracts when its players signed with NHL teams. The CAHA terminated peace talks on October 9, but welcomed individual teams in the WCHL or WOJHL to apply for membership. The Winnipeg Free Press reported that the CAHA offered $5,000 in grants each team, but that WCHL teams had asked for $7,000 instead. The WCHL resumed legal action to get development payments from the NHL after negotiations ended. The CHA and the CAHA continued a tug-of-war over the use of on-ice officials, and the CAHA threatened to suspend to any officials who worked games in the CHA.

The WOJHL reported that its attendance figures had improved and that were financially breaking even or profiting. The league wanted to continue the east-west CHA championship, and felt that its teams were stronger than the previous season since they had signed players who were not drafted by the NHL and had graduated from other junior league in Ontario who had lower age limits. Butlin did not agree to a national final due to last year's incidents, and concerns about the imbalance of talent.

A meeting on March 9, 1970, between the WCHL and the CAHA to resolve all differences ended after 15 minutes. Butlin reported that the CAHA insisted the WCHL accept the same conditions as other junior leagues under CAHA jurisdiction instead of recognizing WCHL concerns. He later claimed that CAHA executives wanted to renegotiate every detail, and called the meeting "an absolute farce".

== Merger with the CAHA ==
The CAHA proposed changes the structure of junior hockey in May 1970, which Butlin stated were interesting to the WCHL. Junior hockey would be divided into two tiers, with the WCHL admitted into the top level tier-1 along with the Ontario Hockey Association Major Junior A Series and the Quebec Major Junior Hockey League. The tier-1 teams would be the only eligible participants for the Memorial Cup, would receive greater development payments from the NHL, and be able to select a limited number of players from tier-2 teams. The same proposal would gradually reduce the number of over-age players used in the WCHL from four to two. Later in May, the Alberta Supreme Court ruled in favour of the WCHL being paid $13,200 in development payments based on the wording of the CAHA-NHL agreement. Butlin considered further legal action to seek $40,700 in payments from the 1969 NHL Amateur Draft.

On June 24, 1970, the CAHA and the WCHL signed a two-year agreement to reunite the organizations. The WCHL gained direct representation on the CAHA junior council, and paid a flat registration fee per team rather than a percentage of gate receipts. The WCHL was admitted as a tier-1 league, qualified automatically for the Memorial Cup final, and would receive $100,000 in development grants for the 1970–71 season. The WCHL would be allowed four over-age players in the upcoming season, then reduced to two. The WCHL agreed to abide by the CAHA residency requirements and be limited to transfer six players between branches of the CAHA west of Ontario, and be allowed to select a maximum of two players from a tier-2 team. The WCHL would be expected to abide by any future CAHA-NHL agreements, and the CAHA agreed to distribute outstanding draft money. The WCHL agreed not to expand or relocate teams into other markets without CAHA approval.

The CHA was subsequently phased out and the WOJHL was replaced by the Southern Ontario Junior A Hockey League in 1970, which operated in affiliation to the CAHA.
