= Ron Butlin (ice hockey) =

Canadian ice hockey executive (1925–2014)

- Born: August 8, 1925; Calgary, Alberta, Canada
- Died: September 24, 2014 (aged 89); Victoria, British Columbia, Canada
- Education: University of Alberta
- Occupation: Trustee in bankruptcy
- Known for: Canadian Hockey Association; Western Canada Hockey League; Western Canada Senior Hockey League; BC Games Society

Ronald James Butlin (August 8, 1925 – September 24, 2014) was a Canadian ice hockey executive. He was president of the Western Canada Hockey League (WCHL) from 1968 to 1971, when the league separated from the Canadian Amateur Hockey Association (CAHA) due to grievances arising from the National Hockey League (NHL) agreement for the NHL Amateur Draft. He also served as president of the Canadian Hockey Association from 1968 to 1970, which was formed as a national governing body of junior ice hockey in Canada, in opposition to the CAHA. He sought to raise the age limit imposed by the NHL and negotiate better financial terms for the junior teams which developed future professional players. He criticized the CAHA for its spending on administration and wanted hockey policy to be determined by the teams instead of elected officials. He negotiated an agreement to reunite the WCHL with the CAHA in 1970, where the WCHL gained direct representation on the CAHA junior council, better financial return for drafted players, and received development grants from the NHL.

Butlin previously hosted a sports radio show, and was a founding member and later president of the Calgary Booster Club. He founded the independent Calgary Spurs senior ice hockey team in 1964, which joined the Western Canada Senior Hockey League in 1965. After the Spurs were 1967 Allan Cup finalists, he helped establish a senior league based in Western Canada which included the Canada men's national ice hockey team in its schedule. He sold the Spurs in 1968. After his tenure with the WCHL, he was executive director of Sport Alberta from 1973 to 1977, and directed the first Alberta Summer Games in 1974, and the first Alberta Winter Games in 1976. He then became the manager-director of the BC Games Society which oversaw the BC Summer Games and the BC Winter Games until 1987, and then coordinated the Washington state centennial in 1989. He later spent 21 years organizing the annual Santa Claus parade and the Victoria Day parades in Victoria, British Columbia.

== Early life and education ==
Ronald James Butlin was born on August 8, 1925, in Calgary, Alberta. His grandfather James had participated in the westward march of the North-West Mounted Police in 1874. Butlin studied at the University of Alberta, then became a trustee in bankruptcy, and the owner of a business in Calgary. His company was known as Central Liquidation Limited, and helped him earn a personal fortune.

Butlin was a baseball coach during the 1950s, and was elected vice-president of the Alberta Fastball Association in 1953. He and Arthur Ryan Smith hosted a weekly amateur sports radio show on CFAC, and a hot stove league on broadcasts of the Western Hockey League in the late 1950s. Butlin was a founding member of the Calgary Booster Club, served as its president from 1961 to 1963, and was later made an honorary life director of the club.

== Calgary Spurs and senior hockey ==
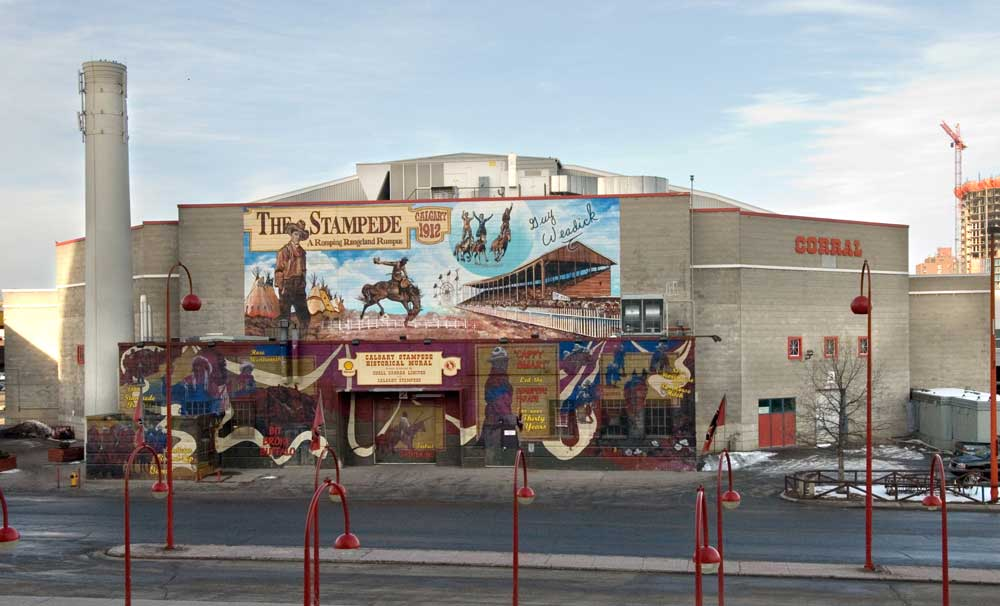
The Stampede Corral in Calgary

Butlin founded the Calgary Spurs as an independent senior ice hockey team in 1964, after the Calgary Stampeders team had folded. The Spurs were not part of any league and played an exhibition schedule during the 1964–65 season. The team had an average of 3,000 fans per home game which increased when it joined the Alberta Amateur Hockey Association (AAHA) playoffs. Senior hockey in Alberta was consolidated into the Alberta Senior Hockey League during June 1965. The Spurs were invited to join the newly formed Alberta league, and were also invited to join the Western Canada Senior Hockey League (WCSHL) which was based in both Alberta and Saskatchewan. He considered offers from both leagues, and chose to join the WCSHL. The Spurs finished the 1965–66 WCSHL season in first place, but lost to the Drumheller Miners in the league playoffs.

Butlin brought a professional approach to amateur hockey in Calgary according to The Canadian Press. He divided profits at the end of the season among the players instead of paying salaries, provided medical benefits, assisted in finding day jobs for players in Calgary, and transported the team to distant away games by airplane to avoid time lost at their jobs. The Spurs played home games at the Stampede Corral, and were the only team in the WCSHL to have all home and away games broadcast on the radio. Butlin at one time considered operating a professional hockey team, but discussions did not progress beyond preliminary stages.

During the 1966–67 WCSHL season, the Canadian Amateur Hockey Association (CAHA) upheld a protest by the Saskatchewan Amateur Hockey Association (SAHA) that the Spurs had used ineligible players registered after the December 31 deadline. Butlin responded by taking legal action against the AAHA, who according to him had given permission for the signings. The Alberta Supreme Court upheld the original AAHA decision that both players were eligible, but CAHA secretary-manager Gordon Juckes enforced the suspensions since no court order had been issued against the CAHA. The Spurs finished the season in first place, won the T. B. Patton Cup as senior champions of Western Canada, but lost in the 1967 Allan Cup final versus Drummondville Eagles for the national championship. Attendance for the season in Calgary exceeded 100,000 fans.

The Allan Cup was the championship trophy for amateur senior ice hockey in Canada.

In May 1967, Butlin proposed a major senior hockey league for Western Canada, and expected the higher-level league to begin operation for the 1967–68 season. He invited the Canada men's national ice hockey team based in Winnipeg, and the United States men's national ice hockey team based in from Saint Paul, Minnesota, to play in the league along with teams from Calgary, Edmonton, Saskatoon and Regina. He sought a long-term commitment from the national teams, and wanted to strengthen rosters of the other club teams for balanced competitive play. He proposed for the league to use international ice hockey rules and act as a talent pool for the national teams, and later invited the Finland men's national ice hockey team to play a series of exhibitions games in the proposed league. In June 1967, the league diverged into two separate senior leagues which both kept the WCSHL name.

Butlin offered the Calgary Spurs for sale in August 1967, and intended to accept a position as president of the new league. He acted as spokesperson for the new league, and hoped for multiple European national teams to play games against the league. Later in August, Butlin decided to remain owner of the team. He signed a new ice agreement with the Corral, brought in partners to help operate the team, and switched to player salaries instead of dividing end-of-year profits. Butlin later chose not to accept the league president position, but he felt that Canadian would show interested in the use of international rules of play and three on-ice officials for games.

Butlin sought to hire a full-time general manager for the Spurs when Marv Vangotsinoven resigned in March 1968, after four seasons with the team. In April 1968, the WCSHL was in danger of folding, and Butlin considered joining the Western International Hockey League whose senior teams were based in British Columbia and Washington. Butlin stated he was leaving senior hockey in June 1968, because he felt junior ice hockey had a better future. He reportedly asked for C$12,000 to sell the Spurs, but an agreement was not reached. A separate group of owners submitted a bid to the Alberta Senior Hockey League in July 1968, for a team to be called the Calgary Stampeders that would use free agent players from the Spurs. Butlin later sold the team after operating it for four seasons.

== Western Canada Hockey League ==
The Memorial Cup represented the junior hockey championship of Canada, and was controlled by the CAHA.

On June 8, 1968, the Western Canada Junior Hockey League changed its name to the Western Canada Hockey League (WCHL), and affiliated with the Canadian Hockey Association (CHA) which was established as a national governing body of junior ice hockey in opposition to the CAHA, and the National Hockey League (NHL) agreement for the NHL Amateur Draft. Butlin was named president of both organizations, and was kept on a retainer and given expenses instead of a salary.

Butlin was opposed to the CAHA structure of elected officials who determined hockey policy but were not connected to a team, and felt that "teams within the association should be allowed to guide their own destiny". His main objective for the CHA was to seek better financial return for their teams' efforts, and wanted to see more money given to teams for travel expenses to the Memorial Cup final.

Butlin felt that according to the NHL Amateur Draft agreement with the CAHA, the WCHL should receive the corresponding development payments for its players. The NHL responded that it would not do business with players who had contracts to CHA teams due to potential lawsuits, and had no intention of promoting a relationship with the CHA. Butlin claimed that CHA team had no issue signing players to contracts despite being shunned by the NHL.

Butlin wanted the WCHL to be more involved in the community, and operate clinics for minor ice hockey players, coaches and managers. He felt that a player's education was important, and drafted the league's schedule to minimize the number of days a player would miss from school. He was adamant that changes were needed and wanted to prove to the CAHA that the CHA was doing the right thing. He also claimed that the National Fitness Council wanted a different organization to run junior hockey in Canada, and planned to present a brief to the council for an operational grant.

Butlin looked to expand the CHA eastward, and targeted the Western Ontario Junior Hockey League (WOJHL). He made a 20-minute presentation to the league at a meeting in Sarnia, and convinced five teams from the league to join the CHA. He also courted the Border Cities Junior Hockey League, met with the Northern Ontario Junior Hockey League, and attempted to get the British Columbia Junior Hockey League (BCJHL) to join the CHA.

=== 1968–69 season ===
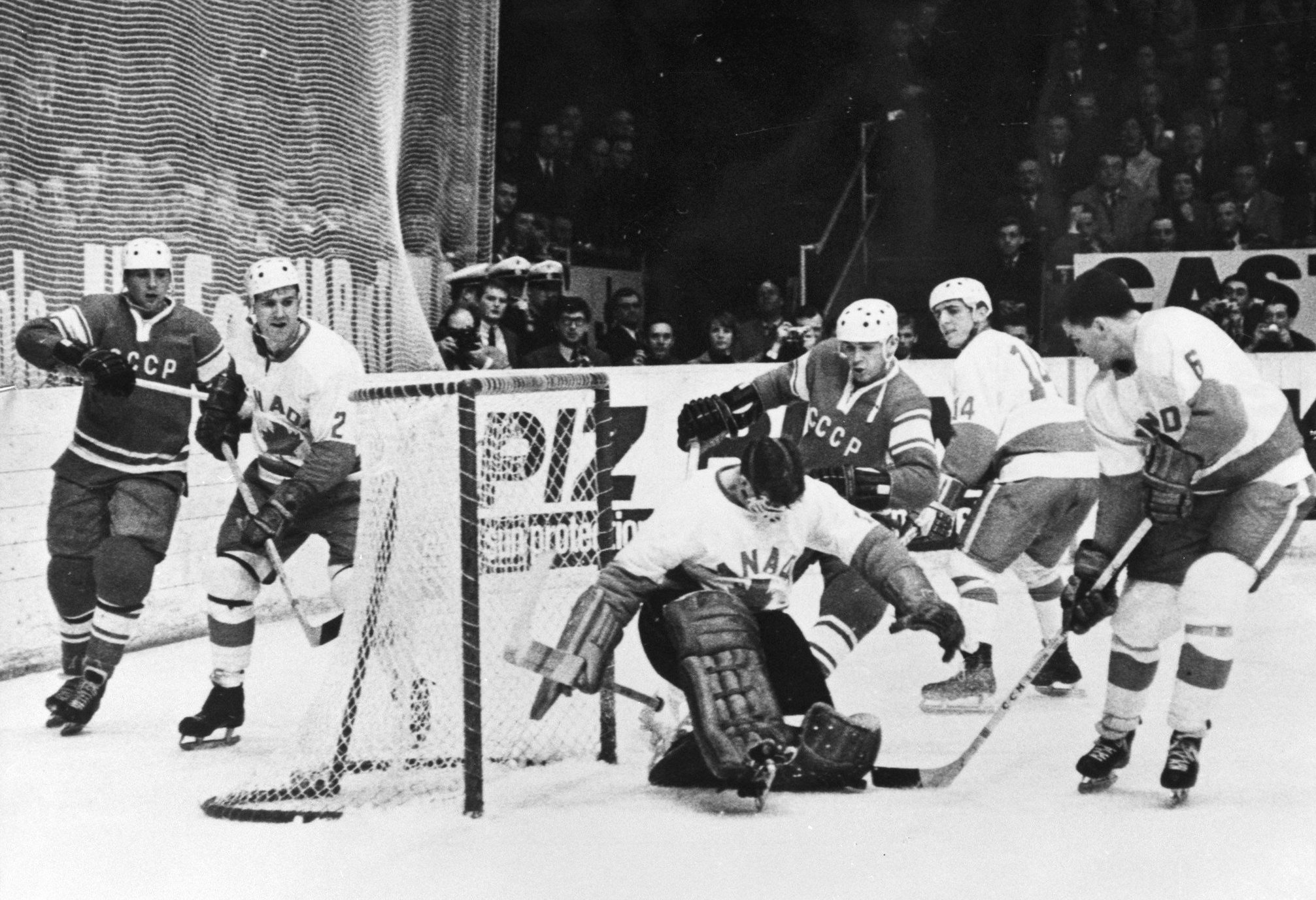
Canada's national team versus the Soviet Union in 1967

Butlin continued his verbal attack against the CAHA into the 1968–69 season, whereas the CAHA had mostly ignored him. He stated that the CHA was contemplating expansion into minor ice hockey in addition to junior ice hockey, in an attempt to "change the hockey pattern in Canada". He criticized the CAHA for accepting the NHL's lower the age limit that was "a move to put the kids into the money machine faster". He felt the NHL should be pressured to pay more money for players it drafted, and that the CAHA wasted too much money on administration that could be spent on its teams.

The CAHA refused requests to have WCHL teams to play exhibition games against the Canada men's national ice hockey team. Butlin claimed the decision was discrimination against the WCHL, referred to his league as "good, clean-cut Canadian kids" and contested that "Canada's national team is professional in every respect". He felt that the $200,000 grant from the Government of Canada towards the national team was a waste of tax payers' money since the team would not win anything, but felt government should have more say into its operation.

In October 1968, the CAHA released the disbursement of development payments from the 1968 NHL Amateur Draft. The statement omitted payments for players drafted from the WCHL while the league was under CAHA jurisdiction. The CAHA refused to issue the payments as it considered all teams under the CHA jurisdiction to be defunct. In January 1969, Butlin announced legal action against the CAHA to seek development payments from the NHL, which totaled $13,200.

Teams in Eastern Canada wanted to test the legality of the contract used by the CHA. Butlin stated that he would take legal action against the Quebec Amateur Hockey Association, the Quebec Junior Hockey League and its team from Sorel, for using two players who were under contract to the Winnipeg Jets. He chose not to test the CHA's contract in court due to differences in civil law in Quebec compared to the rest of Canada. The CHA contract was tested again when the Manitoba Junior Hockey League gave permission for the Dauphin Kings to use Butch Goring, who had been signed by the Winnipeg Jets. Merv Haney also departed the Jets for the Dauphin Kings. Butlin stated that the WCHL would seek a court injunction to prevent both from playing, and that the CHA would seek damages against the Dauphin Kings and the Manitoba Amateur Hockey Association.

Butlin expected the WCHL to expand to British Columbia for the next season, and mentioned that Vancouver was actively scouting for players and he also wanted teams in Victoria and New Westminster. He hoped for at least three teams in each of the provinces in Western Canada, and eventually wanted to see a junior league which spanned across Canada.

==== National championship ====
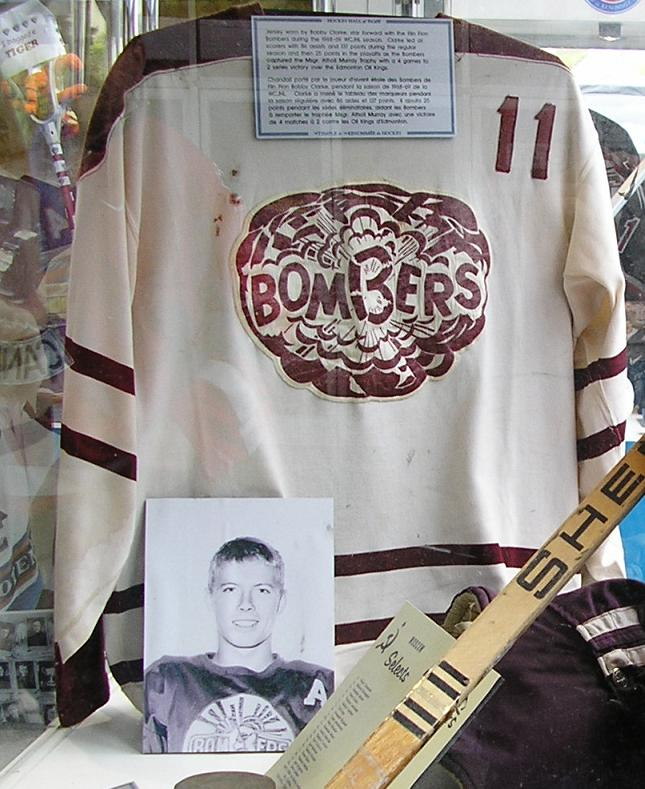
The Flin Flon Bombers were champions of the WCHL and CHA for the 1968–69 season (Bobby Clarke's jersey and photo shown).

The Flin Flon Bombers from the WCHL and the St. Thomas Barons from the WOJHL were the respective league champions, and met in the CHA east-west national final for the Father Athol Murray Trophy. It was arranged as a best-of-four series to begin in St. Thomas, Ontario. The series was the first Canadian national junior ice hockey championship not under the jurisdiction of the CAHA. Butlin also issued a challenge to the CAHA to have the 1969 Memorial Cup champion play against the CHA champion.

During the fourth game of the series played on May 5 at the Whitney Forum in Flin Flon, the Barons refused to continue after an on-ice brawl during the second period. The game was awarded to the Bombers who then led the series 3–1 after four games played. The Barons abandoned the series in the interest of player safety, and departed for St. Thomas despite a scheduled game on May 7 in Flin Flon.

The Canadian Press described the Barons as being over-matched in the series and were not up to the calibre of the Bombers of the WCHL. Butlin threatened that CHA would seize the team's assets if the Barons did not play game five, stating that the series cost $10,000 to $12,000 to operate. He later awarded the series to the Bombers and suspended the Barons, and stated any money received from the series would go to cover expenses. Butlin later agreed not to suspend the team and let the WOJHL handle the discipline instead.

=== 1969–70 season ===
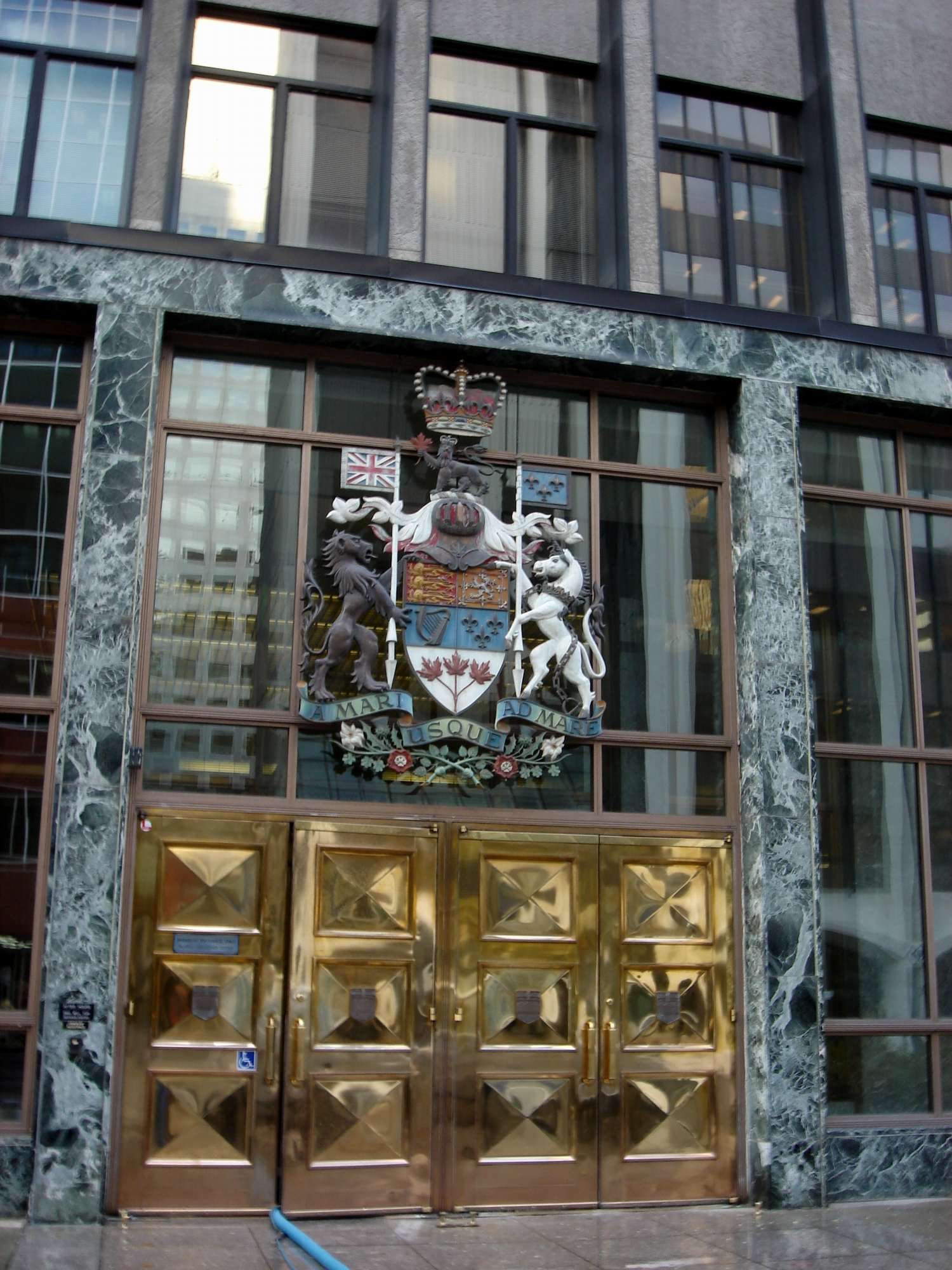
Butlin began multiple legal actions which were decided at the Alberta Supreme Court in Calgary (building pictured).

In May 1969, the CAHA released a restructuring proposal which would implement three separate councils for minor ice hockey, junior ice hockey, and senior ice hockey, to be composed of hockey businessmen and team operators; something which Butlin had demanded. On July 30, Butlin and CAHA president Earl Dawson announced a tentative agreement where the WCHL would rejoin the CAHA. Twenty players from the WCHL were chosen in the 1969 NHL amateur draft which increased the amount of disputed draft payments, with legal action on the 1968 draft money scheduled to appear before the Alberta Supreme Court in August 1969. Butlin denied he was responsible for the rift between the WCHL and the CAHA in the war of words that ensued between him and Dawson. As of September 16, 1969, the agreement had not been approved by the CAHA.

On October 4, Butlin stated the WCHL would start its season outside of CAHA jurisdiction, and insisted on a joint meeting with the NHL and the CAHA to discuss WCHL players who signed with NHL teams. He met again with the CAHA to negotiate a settlement, but resumed legal action for the NHL draft payments when talks were unsuccessful. The WCHL and the OHA subsequently began a competition to sign each other's players, in what Butlin described as retaliation due to the OHA declaring war on the WCHL.

Butlin and the WCHL announced a gate receipt sharing plan where larger cities would assist the smaller cities. He attempted to expand the WCHL westward by inviting the Victoria Cougars of the BCJHL to join. Despite his efforts, westward expansion faced skepticism by some team owners in established cities due to the lower calibre of the new teams, and more time away from schooling to travel further. The WOJHL wanted to continue the east-west CHA championship, and felt that its teams were stronger than the previous season. Butlin did not agree to a national final due to last year's incidents, and concerns about the imbalance of talent.

A meeting on March 9, 1970, between the WCHL and the CAHA to resolve all differences ended after 15 minutes. Butlin reported that the CAHA insisted the WCHL accept the same conditions as other junior leagues under CAHA jurisdiction instead of recognizing WCHL grievances. He later claimed that CAHA executives wanted to renegotiate every detail, and called the meeting "an absolute farce".

=== 1970–71 season ===
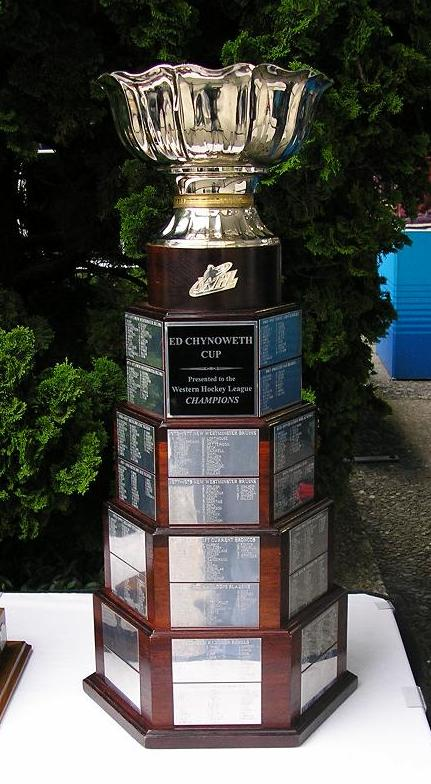
The President's Cup was the championship trophy of the WCHL.

Butlin claimed that the WCHL was now a $1-million operation and that attendance figures had grown from 429,000 during the 1968–69 season to 530,000 during the 1969–70 season. The league also added the Medicine Hat Tigers as an expansion team and welcomed the Regina Pats who transferred from the Saskatchewan Junior Hockey League. He explained that the upcoming WCHL expansion draft was designed that new teams would be competitive in their first year, and allowed established teams to protect only six players before drafting began.

The WCHL and CAHA came closer to reuniting in May 1970. The CAHA again discussed restructuring its CAHA committee and proposed splitting junior hockey into two tiers, which Butlin stated was interesting to the WCHL. The Alberta Supreme Court ruled in favour of the WCHL being paid $13,200 in development payments from the CAHA, and stated that the teams qualified for the payments based on the wording of the CAHA-NHL agreement. Butlin considered further court action to receive an additional $40,700 from the 1969 NHL draft.

On June 20, 1970, Butlin's contract as WCHL president was extended for an additional two years. The CAHA and the WCHL signed a two-year affiliation agreement on June 24, 1970. The WCHL gained direct representation on the CAHA junior council, and paid a flat registration fee per team rather than a percentage of gate receipts. The WCHL was admitted as a tier-1 league, qualified automatically for the Memorial Cup final, and would receive $100,000 in development grants for the 1970–71 season. The WCHL would be allowed four over-age players in the upcoming season, then reduced to two. The WCHL agreed to abide by the CAHA residency requirements and be limited to transfer six players between branches of the CAHA west of Ontario, and be allowed to select a maximum of two players from a tier-2 team. The WCHL would be expected to abide by any future CAHA-NHL agreements, and the CAHA agreed to distribute outstanding draft money. The WCHL agreed not to expand or relocate teams into other markets without CAHA approval. The CHA was subsequently phased out.

In August 1970, Butlin announced an affiliation agreement with the tier-2 BCJHL, where the WCHL would place its top prospect players for training and provide financial support and with scouting expertise. He also looked to negotiate similar agreements with other tier-2 leagues in Alberta, Saskatchewan and Manitoba.

Butlin and the CAHA had disagreements over roster movements to the WCHL from other leagues in October 1970, and the WCHL was threatened with expulsion from the CAHA. At issue was the number of over-age players in the WCHL, and players who were formerly on OHA teams claimed by an automatic release. The CAHA did not use automatic release provisions in the 1970–71 season, and Butlin was forced to find alternate arrangements to settle disputes between the WCHL and other teams.

Butlin resigned as WCHL president on June 21, 1971, and was unhappy with how some of the team owners did business. He was cautious about expanding in to British Columbia and stated that several team owners did the negotiations without him. He also stated he wanted to get away from hockey, despite reports that he was interested in operating the Vancouver franchise in the WCHL. He felt he would have received a vote of confidence from the league if he had asked, and had one year remaining on his contract.

== Other sports in 1972 ==
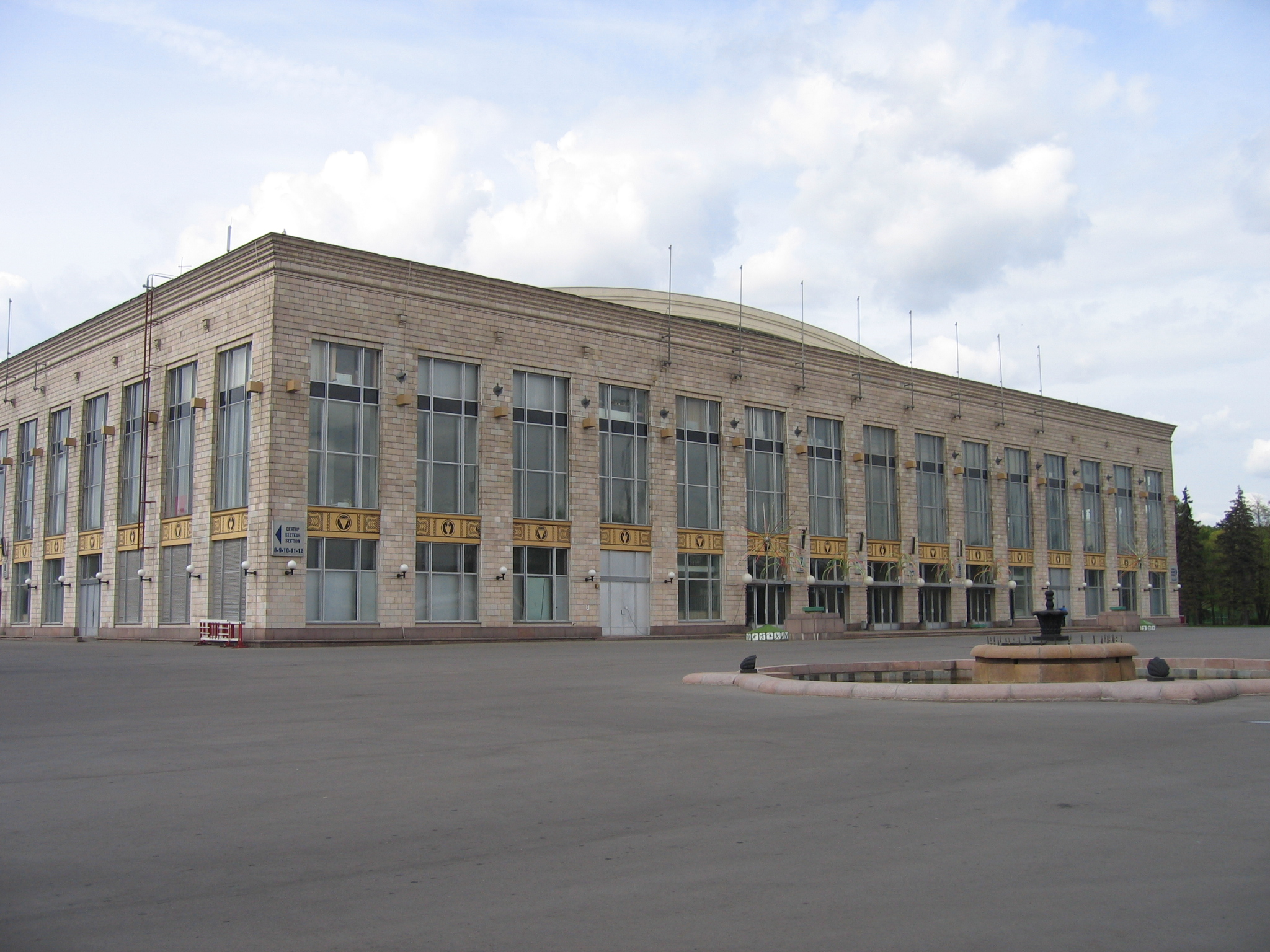
Palace of Sports of the Central Lenin Stadium in Moscow

Butlin was chairman of the CFL All-Star Game festival, hosted at McMahon Stadium in Calgary on June 28, 1972.

In October 1972, Butlin was in attendance at the final four games played during the Summit Series in Moscow. He recalled that upon his arrival at the airport, "We were looking for normal customs people. All we could see were soldiers with rifles. It was a dictatorship in those days". He found the locals in Moscow friendly despite the security presence. During games at the Palace of Sports of the Central Lenin Stadium, Butlin noted that spectators were very quiet and when Soviet leader Leonid Brezhnev stood up, all one could hear was the sound of skates on the ice.

== Sport Alberta director ==
Butlin became the part-time executive director of Sport Alberta by October 1973, and announced that the first Alberta Summer Games would held in Calgary from August 22 to 25, 1974. He was critical of the Canadian Olympic Committee which later announced its Junior Olympics would be in Edmonton from August 10 to 16, after the Alberta Summer Games had already been announced. In May 1974, he was appointed by Peter Lougheed the Premier of Alberta, to become the first full-time executive director of Sport Alberta.

Butlin wanted participation at the summer games by amateur athletes ranging from 13 to 80 years old. He went on a publicity tour giving press conferences to raise interest in the event. The games planned to provide room and board for athletes who lived outside of larger cities to encourage participation from all regions of Alberta, and divisions created for national or international-level amateurs, in addition to a general provincial amateur division. He expected 40,000 athletes to participate, and the games to cost $180,000. The budget included $100,000 paid by the provincial government, with the remainder from private sector contributions and the City of Calgary.

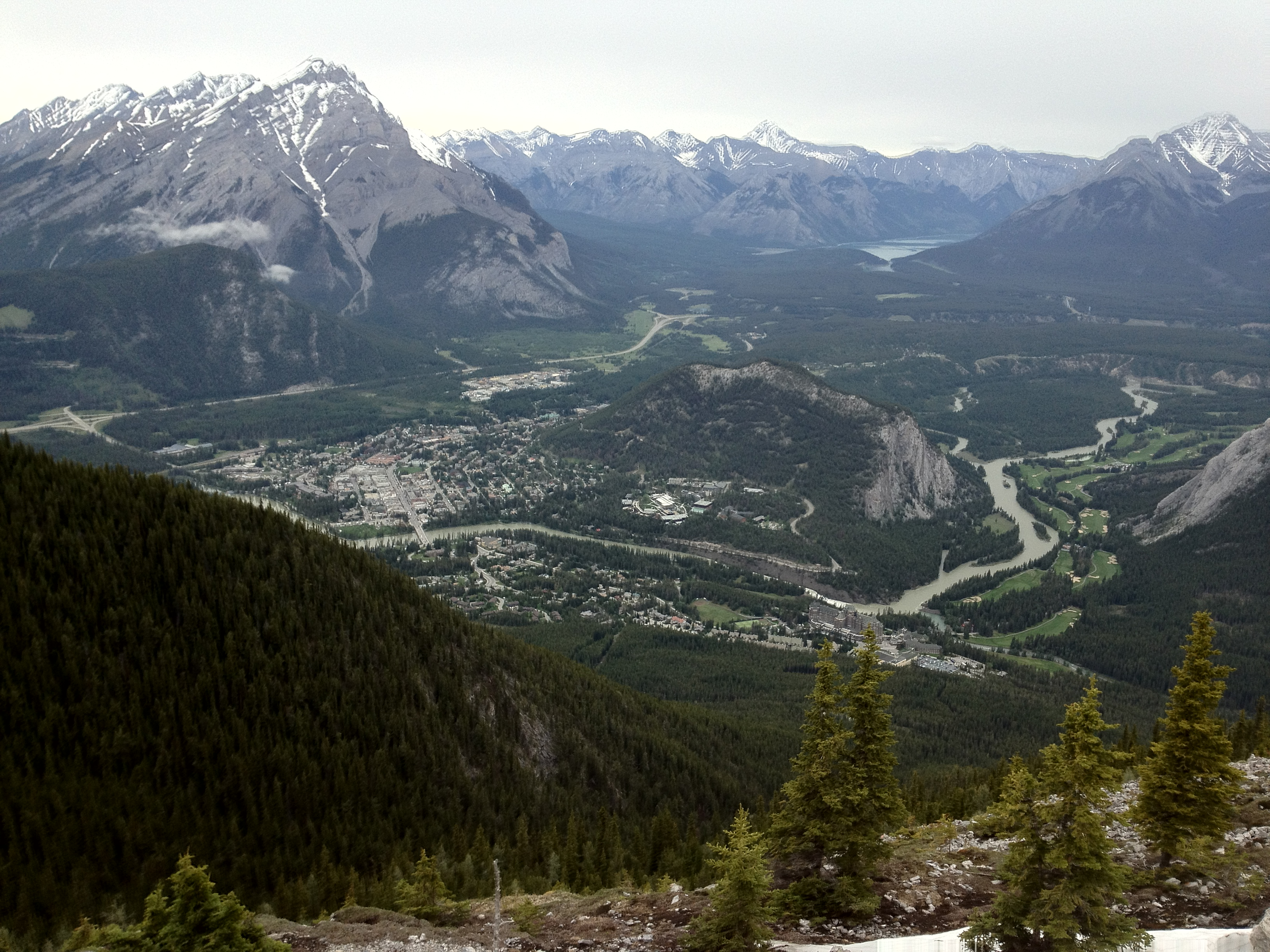
Banff, Alberta

No winter games were held in 1975 to avoid competing with 1975 Canada Winter Games in Lethbridge. Butlin selected Red Deer, Alberta as host of the 1975 summer games, and Banff, Alberta as the host location for the first Alberta Winter Games to be held in March 1976.

Butlin announced Medicine Hat as the location for the Alberta Winter Games in 1978, and expected the operating budget to increase to $200,000 for 50,000 athletes. He also hoped for increased private sector donations, due to new regulations allowing larger contributions by companies.

== British Columbia games ==
Butlin moved from Calgary to Victoria in 1977, and was hired as the manager-director of the newly established BC Games Society, which would oversee the BC Summer Games and the BC Winter Games. He stated that British Columbia was the first Canadian province to attempt to host annual summer and winter games starting in 1978. The provincial government provided $180,000 towards the inaugural summer games, with plans to fund a legacy project up to $70,000 in the host location. He stated that event in the summer games would be chosen according to available facilities. A strike by employees at the College of New Caledonia in Prince George, British Columbia led to Butlin finding other accommodations for athletes at the 1981 BC Winter Games. He made regular practice of declaring each version of the games as "the best one yet". He parted ways with the BC Games Society by mutual agreement after his contract expired in 1987.

== Washington state centennial ==
Butlin discussed with the State of Washington in late 1986 that he was willing to accept a position to coordinate Winter Games and Summer Games in celebration of the state's centennial in 1989. He left his position in British Columbia when he received a better financial offer from Washington.

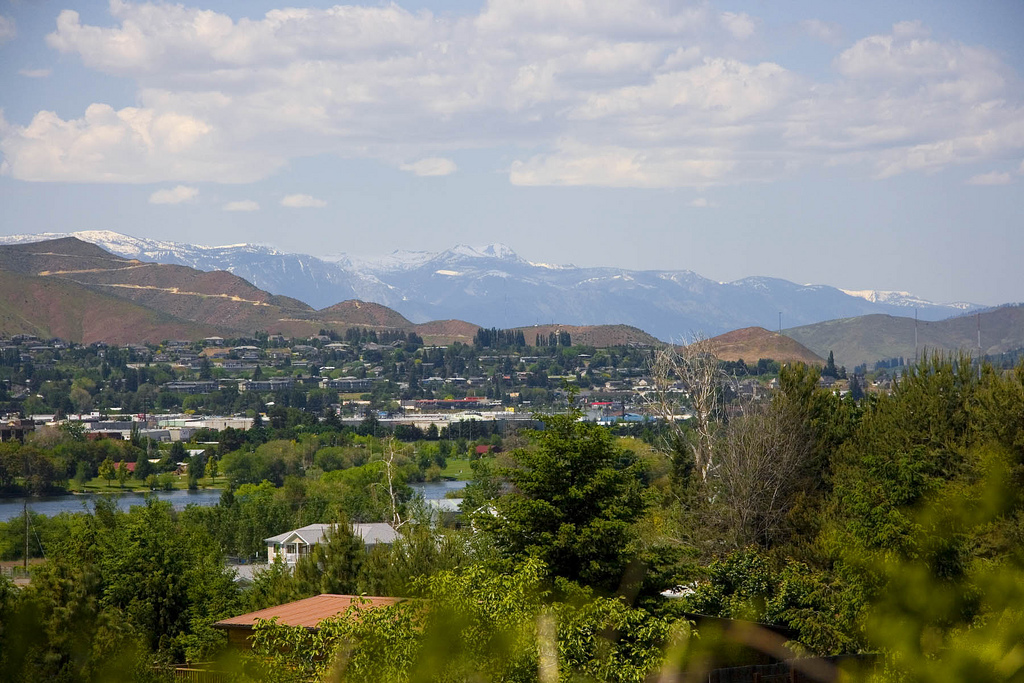
Skyline of Wenatchee, Washington

The Winter Games were hosted primarily in Wenatchee, with some venues in Leavenworth and Chelan. Butlin acknowledged difficulties in raising funds due to it being a first-time event, and competition from other state centennial events for corporate sponsors. He made agreements with KXLY-TV and KIRO-TV to broadcast the games, which led to other corporate interest. Events were chosen which suited existing facilities to reduce costs. The games had a lower profile due to competition from the 1990 Goodwill Games. Additional television broadcasts by KAPP and KVEW, which helped a budget of $341,000 be raised. Butlin expected 1,700 athletes to attend, competing in 23 sports. He referred to the Centennial games as "a festival of sport, a bringing together of people from all ages and skill levels".

Butlin sought to raise $341,000 to operate the Summer Games to be generated from corporate sponsors and state taxes. He stated that anticipated sponsorships had not materialized, but the Summer Games could benefit from a $40,000 surplus reported from the Winter Games. The Summer Games were to be held in Spokane, although Butlin resigned before then due to shortfalls in funding and the Summer Games being reduced in size.

== Parade organizer in Victoria ==
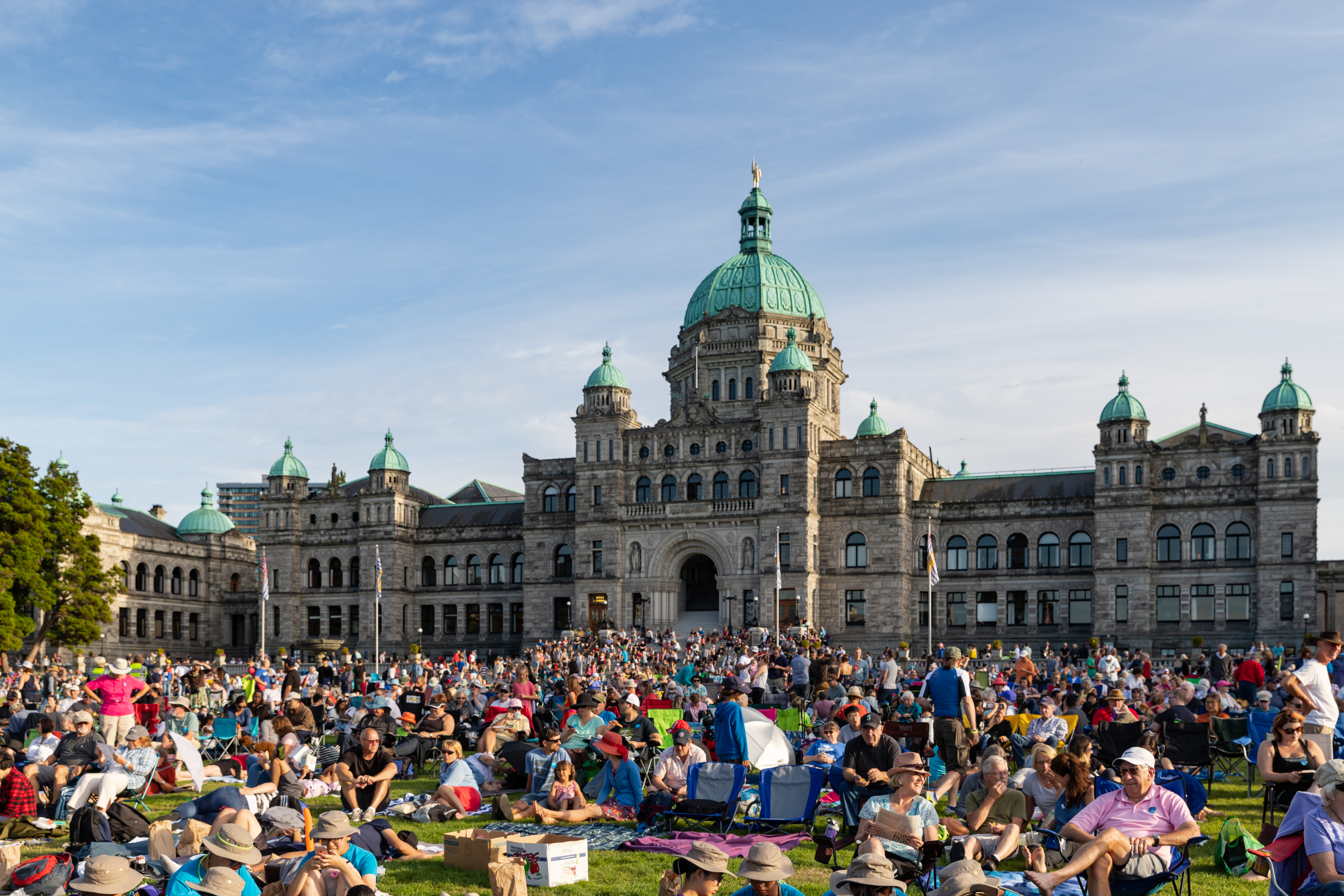
Victoria Day parade crowds at the British Columbia Parliament Buildings in Victoria, British Columbia

Butlin spent the last 21 years of his life organizing the annual Santa Claus parade and the Victoria Day parade in Victoria, British Columbia. Bill Bennett, the Premier of British Columbia recruited Butlin to organize the events with limited financial resources. Butlin was able to run the events without using a computer, brought local grocery retailer Island Farms on board as a title sponsor. The Times Colonist credited Butlin for increasing the Christmas parade's popularity when it was converted into a lighted event at nighttime, which he felt would benefit downtown area businesses due to shopping by parade spectators.

== Personal life and death ==
Butlin was friends with NHL president Clarence Campbell, and would get together frequently in the off-season. Butlin was married to Shirley, with whom he had two daughters. He had heart problems and other medical issues later in life. He died on September 24, 2014, at age 89 in Victoria. He had been predeceased by his wife, and a celebration of life was scheduled for October 18, 2014.
