= Darwin Mott =

Canadian ice hockey player

- Born: August 19, 1950 (age 75) Creelman, Saskatchewan, Canada
- Height: 5 ft 9 in (175 cm)
- Weight: 165 lb (75 kg; 11 st 11 lb)
- Position: Left wing
- Shot: Left
- Played for: Philadelphia Blazers (WHA); Phoenix Roadrunners (WHL); Toledo Goaldiggers (IHL); Salt Lake Golden Eagles (CHL); Frölunda HC (Sweden)
- WHA draft: Rounds 71+, 1972; Calgary Broncos
- Playing career: 1972–1977

Darwin Mott (born August 19, 1950) is a Canadian former professional ice hockey player. He was selected by the Calgary Broncos in the late rounds of the 1972 WHA General Player Draft.

During the 1972–73 season, Mott played one game in the World Hockey Association with the Philadelphia Blazers. He is the brother of Morris Mott, who played in both the National Hockey League and the WHA; the two played together for Västra Frölunda IF in Sweden in 1975-76.

== Career statistics ==
=== Regular season and playoffs ===
			Regular season					Playoffs
Season	Team	League	GP	G	A	Pts	PIM	GP	G	A	Pts	PIM
1967–68	Weyburn Red Wings	WCJHL	60	29	43	72	29	—	—	—	—	—
1969–70	Michigan Tech	WCHA	31	11	28	39	18	—	—	—	—	—
1970–71	Michigan Tech	WCHA	30	13	23	36	18	—	—	—	—	—
1971–72	Michigan Tech	WCHA	34	9	27	36	10	—	—	—	—	—
1972–73	Michigan Tech	WCHA	38	19	21	40	8	—	—	—	—	—
1972–73	Philadelphia Blazers	WHA	1	0	0	0	0	—	—	—	—	—
1973–74	Phoenix Roadrunners	WHL	78	22	27	49	44	9	2	6	8	8
1974–75	Toledo Goaldiggers	IHL	72	25	39	64	14	19	10	10	20	6
1974–75	Salt Lake Golden Eagles	CHL	1	0	0	0	0	—	—	—	—	—
1975–76	Vastra Frolunda	SEL	36	19	10	29	33	—	—	—	—	—
1976–77	Vastra Frolunda	SEL	25	6	10	16	4	—	—	—	—	—
1977–78	Kimberley Dynamiters	WIHL	––	4	14	18	18	—	—	—	—	—
1979–80	Trail Smoke Eaters	WIHL	Statistics Unavailable
WHA totals			1	0	0	0	0	–	–	–	–	–
