= Bob Heaney =

Canadian ice hockey player

- Born: December 5, 1945 (age 79); Montreal, Quebec, CAN
- Height: 5 ft 11 in (180 cm)
- Weight: 180 lb (82 kg; 12 st 12 lb)
- Position: Defence
- Shot: Right
- Played for: CPHL; Minneapolis Bruins; Oklahoma City Blazers; Kansas City Blues; Amarillo Wranglers; AHL; Hershey Bears; Cleveland Barons; WHL; Salt Lake Golden Eagles; IHL; Dayton Gems
- WHA draft: Rounds 71+, 1972; Calgary Broncos
- Playing career: 1965–1972

Bob Heaney (born December 5, 1945) is a Canadian former professional ice hockey defenceman. He was selected by the Calgary Broncos in the late rounds of the 1972 WHA General Player Draft.

== Career statistics ==
| | | | Regular season | | | | | Playoffs |
| Season | Team | League | GP | G | A | Pts | PIM | GP | G | A | Pts | PIM |
|---|---|---|---|---|---|---|---|---|---|---|---|---|
| 1964–65 | Minneapolis Bruins | CPHL | 2 | 0 | 1 | 1 | 2 | 2 | 0 | 0 | 0 | 2 |
| 1965–66 | Estevan Bruins | WCHL | N/A |
| 1966–67 | Oklahoma City Blazers | CPHL | 47 | 4 | 17 | 21 | 37 | 10 | 0 | 0 | 0 | 2 |
| 1967–68 | Hershey Bears | AHL | 65 | 6 | 13 | 19 | 58 | 4 | 0 | 0 | 0 | 2 |
| 1967–68 | Oklahoma City Blazers | CPHL | 5 | 0 | 1 | 1 | 2 | -- | -- | -- | -- | -- |
| 1968–69 | Oklahoma City Blazers | CHL | 14 | 0 | 0 | 0 | 6 | -- | -- | -- | -- | -- |
| 1968–69 | Kansas City Blues | CHL | 56 | 2 | 19 | 21 | 48 | 4 | 0 | 1 | 1 | 2 |
| 1969–70 | Salt Lake Golden Eagles | WHL | 72 | 10 | 22 | 32 | 69 | -- | -- | -- | -- | -- |
| 1970–71 | Cleveland Barons | AHL | 4 | 0 | 0 | 0 | 2 | -- | -- | -- | -- | -- |
| 1970–71 | Salt Lake Golden Eagles | WHL | 8 | 1 | 3 | 4 | 7 | -- | -- | -- | -- | -- |
| 1970–71 | Amarillo Wranglers | CHL | 56 | 3 | 17 | 20 | 34 | -- | -- | -- | -- | -- |
| 1971–72 | Dayton Gems | IHL | 70 | 8 | 24 | 32 | 18 | 5 | 1 | 1 | 2 | 4 |
