= Ken Brown (ice hockey) =

Canadian ice hockey player (1948–2022)

- Born: December 19, 1948 Port Arthur, Ontario, Canada
- Died: July 22, 2022 (aged 73)
- Height: 5 ft 11 in (180 cm)
- Weight: 175 lb (79 kg; 12 st 7 lb)
- Position: Goaltender
- Caught: Left
- Played for: Chicago Black Hawks; Alberta/Edmonton Oilers
- Playing career: 1968–1975

Kenneth Murray Brown (December 19, 1948 – July 22, 2022) was a Canadian professional ice hockey goaltender. He played one game in the National Hockey League with the Chicago Black Hawks in 1971, and 52 games in the World Hockey Association with the Alberta/Edmonton Oilers between 1972 and 1975. The rest of his career lasted from 1968 to 1975 and was spent in the minor leagues.

== Playing career ==
Brown won the Canadian Major Junior Hockey League (CMJHL) Goaltender of the Year was named to the CMJHL First All-Star Team in 1967, and signed a free agent contract with the Dallas Black Hawks of the Central Hockey League, the Chicago Black Hawks minor league affiliate. He played one game with Chicago, on March 31, 1971, against the New York Rangers, where he was behind Tony Esposito and Gerry Desjardins on the depth chart, and this was his only game in the National Hockey League.

Brown moved to the new World Hockey Association (WHA) when selected by the Calgary Broncos in the 1972 WHA General Player Draft, although his rights were traded to the Alberta Oilers (renamed as Edmonton Oilers in his second season) for cash. Brown won 21 games with the Oilers over two seasons, appearing in 52 games as the backup to Jack Norris and Jacques Plante. Brown died in July 2022 at the age of 73.

== Career statistics ==
=== Regular season and playoffs ===
			Regular season									Playoffs
Season	Team	League	GP	W	L	T	MIN	GA	SO	GAA	SV%	GP	W	L	T	MIN	GA	SO	GAA	SV%
1964–65	Moose Jaw Canucks	SJHL	13	—	—	—	780	60	1	4.61	—	—	—	—	—	—	—	—	—	—
1965–66	Moose Jaw Canucks	SJHL	14	—	—	—	830	60	0	4.34	—	—	—	—	—	—	—	—	—	—
1965–66	Estevan Bruins	SJHL	20	—	—	—	1190	46	1	2.32	—	3	—	—	—	180	13	0	4.33	—
1965–66	Estevan Bruins	M-Cup	—	—	—	—	—	—	—	—	—	2	1	0	—	100	3	0	1.80	—
1966–67	Moose Jaw Canucks	CMJHL	54	24	18	12	3240	174	3	3.22	—	14	7	3	4	840	55	0	3.93	—
1967–68	Moose Jaw Canucks	WCJHL	58	30	23	5	3480	236	0	4.07	—	10	4	5	1	600	56	1	5.60	—
1967–68	Estevan Bruins	M-Cup	—	—	—	—	—	—	—	—	—	7	3	4	—	426	26	0	3.66	—
1968–69	Dallas Black Hawks	CHL	23	—	—	—	1320	79	0	3.59	—	—	—	—	—	—	—	—	—	—
1969–70	Dallas Black Hawks	CHL	46	22	19	4	2720	142	4	3.13	—	—	—	—	—	—	—	—	—	—
1970–71	Chicago Black Hawks	NHL	1	0	0	0	18	1	0	3.37	.929	—	—	—	—	—	—	—	—	—
1970–71	Dallas Black Hawks	CHL	26	—	—	—	1528	92	0	3.61	—	1	1	0	—	60	2	0	2.00	—
1971–72	Dallas Black Hawks	CHL	31	13	10	2	1683	90	2	3.20	—	11	7	3	—	650	29	0	2.67	—
1972–73	Alberta Oilers	WHA	20	10	8	0	1034	63	1	3.66	.883	—	—	—	—	—	—	—	—	—
1973–74	Winston-Salem Polar Twins	SHL	29	10	17	0	1575	145	0	5.53	.867	5	3	2	—	285	12	0	2.53	—
1974–75	Edmonton Oilers	WHA	32	11	11	0	1466	86	2	3.52	.898	5	—	—	—	—	—	—	2.53	—
WHA totals			52	21	19	0	2500	149	3	3.58	.892	—	—	—	—	—	—	—	—	—
NHL totals			1	0	0	0	18	1	0	3.37	.929	—	—	—	—	—	—	—	—	—

== Awards ==
- CMJHL First All-Star Team – 1967
- WCJHL Second All-Star Team – 1968

== See also ==
- List of players who played only one game in the NHL
