= Brian Marchinko =

Canadian ice hockey player

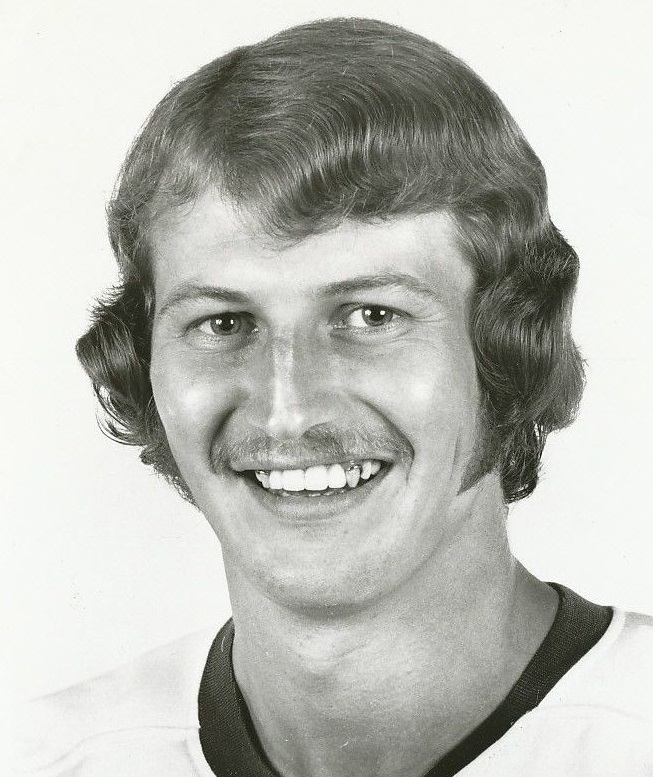
- Marchinko in 1973
- Born: August 2, 1948; Weyburn, Saskatchewan, Canada
- Died: May 12, 2014 (aged 65); Chilliwack, British Columbia, Canada
- Height: 6 ft 0 in (183 cm)
- Weight: 180 lb (82 kg; 12 st 12 lb)
- Position: Centre
- Shot: Right
- Played for: Toronto Maple Leafs; New York Islanders
- NHL draft: Undrafted
- Playing career: 1969–1977

Brian Nicholas Wayne Marchinko (August 2, 1948 – May 12, 2014) was a Canadian professional ice hockey player who played 47 games in the National Hockey League (NHL) with the New York Islanders and Toronto Maple Leafs between 1970 and 1974. The rest of his career, which lasted from 1969 to 1977, was spent in the minor leagues. He was born in Weyburn, Saskatchewan and died in Chilliwack, British Columbia.

== Career statistics ==
=== Regular season and playoffs ===
			Regular season					Playoffs
Season	Team	League	GP	G	A	Pts	PIM	GP	G	A	Pts	PIM
1966–67	Melfort Millionaires	SJHL	—	—	—	—	—	—	—	—	—	—
1967–68	London Nationals	WOHL	25	0	1	1	0	—	—	—	—	—
1967–68	Flin Flon Bombers	WCHL	43	9	16	25	13	15	5	9	14	4
1968–69	Flin Flon Bombers	WCHL	60	41	45	86	96	18	6	9	15	4
1969–70	Tulsa Oilers	CHL	59	8	14	22	30	6	1	0	1	0
1970–71	Toronto Maple Leafs	NHL	2	0	0	0	0	—	—	—	—	—
1970–71	Tulsa Oilers	CHL	67	15	24	39	47	—	—	—	—	—
1971–72	Toronto Maple Leafs	NHL	3	0	0	0	0	—	—	—	—	—
1971–72	Tulsa Oilers	CHL	68	10	24	34	29	13	3	3	6	7
1972–73	New York Islanders	NHL	36	2	6	8	0	—	—	—	—	—
1972–73	New Haven Nighthawks	AHL	7	0	0	0	0	—	—	—	—	—
1973–74	New York Islanders	NHL	6	0	0	0	0	—	—	—	—	—
1973–74	Fort Worth Wings	CHL	54	7	19	26	24	—	—	—	—	—
1973–74	Providence Reds	AHL	10	3	0	3	8	15	7	2	9	9
1974–75	Fort Worth Texans	CHL	78	23	20	43	32	—	—	—	—	—
1975–76	Erie Blades	NAHL	63	27	34	61	29	5	1	2	3	0
1976–77	Erie Blades	NAHL	47	16	21	37	4	—	—	—	—	—
1976–77	Johnstown Jets	NAHL	21	8	9	17	4	3	2	0	2	0
CHL totals			326	63	101	164	162	19	4	3	7	7
NHL totals			47	2	6	8	0	—	—	—	—	—
