= Gregg Sheppard =

Canadian ice hockey player

- Born: April 23, 1949 (age 77) North Battleford, Saskatchewan, Canada
- Height: 5 ft 8 in (173 cm)
- Weight: 160 lb (73 kg; 11 st 6 lb)
- Position: Centre
- Shot: Left
- Played for: Boston Bruins; Pittsburgh Penguins
- Playing career: 1972–1982

Gregory Wayne Sheppard (born April 23, 1949) is a Canadian former professional ice hockey forward who most notably played for the Boston Bruins of the National Hockey League. He played in three Stanley Cup Finals with the Bruins (1974, 1977, 1978).

== Career ==
Sheppard was born in North Battleford, Saskatchewan. Playing in the waning days of the period where teenagers were signed to junior league contracts by NHL teams, Sheppard played his junior hockey for the Estevan Bruins of the Western Hockey League, competing for the Memorial Cup in two seasons and being the star of his team's Memorial Cup drive in 1968. In 1969 Sheppard began a three-year pro apprenticeship with the Oklahoma City Blazers of the Central Hockey League, becoming a Second Team All-Star in 1971. The following season, he was named the league's most valuable player and remains the all-time leading career scorer of the franchise.

Joining the defending Stanley Cup champion Bruins in 1972 as a result of the parent club losing players to expansion and the new World Hockey Association, Sheppard – showing both scoring prowess and exemplary defensive as well penalty killing skills – had a successful rookie season, finishing sixth in balloting for rookie of the year honors. The following season Sheppard made his true mark in the playoffs, scoring eleven goals in sixteen playoff games as the Bruins went to the Cup finals.

He was a mainstay in Boston for six seasons in all, scoring thirty or more goals three straight years—and only a serious injury costing him much of the 1978 season cost him a fourth—as well as proving himself as one of the league's premier faceoff men and penalty killers. He was named to play in the All-Star Game in 1976, during which he won the Bruins' Seventh Player Award as the team's unsung hero and the Elizabeth C. Dufresne Trophy for the player judged best in home games. His best statistical season was 1975, in which he scored 78 points and finished with a plus/minus rating of +45.

Before the 1978–79 season began, Sheppard was dealt to the Pittsburgh Penguins in a three-way deal. At first holding out due to dissatisfaction at the deal, he eventually joined the team in late November 1978, although his days as a scorer were behind him. He played four seasons in all for Pittsburgh before retiring in 1982.

Sheppard played in 657 NHL games in all over ten seasons, finishing with 205 goals and 293 assists for 498 points. A notably clean player for some rough teams, he finished with 243 penalty minutes.

In 2023 he would be named one of the top 100 Bruins players of all time.

== Career statistics ==
			Regular season					Playoffs
Season	Team	League	GP	G	A	Pts	PIM	GP	G	A	Pts	PIM
1965–66	North Battleford North Stars	SAHA	—	—	—	—	—	—	—	—	—	—
1965–66	Estevan Bruins	SJHL	1	1	1	2	0	1	0	0	0	0
1965–66	Estevan Bruins	M-Cup	—	—	—	—	—	1	1	0	1	0
1966–67	Estevan Bruins	CMJHL	52	44	24	68	14	12	11	9	20	4
1967–68	Estevan Bruins	WCJHL	58	35	46	81	68	14	13	7	20	6
1967–68	Estevan Bruins	M-Cup	—	—	—	—	—	14	12	11	23	18
1968–69	Estevan Bruins	WCJHL	54	42	42	84	33	10	1	7	8	0
1968–69	Oklahoma City Blazers	CHL	4	0	0	0	0	—	—	—	—	—
1969–70	Oklahoma City Blazers	CHL	65	26	29	55	19	—	—	—	—	—
1969–70	Salt Lake Golden Eagles	WHL	5	0	0	0	2	—	—	—	—	—
1970–71	Oklahoma City Blazers	CHL	68	25	50	75	45	5	2	3	5	5
1971–72	Oklahoma City Blazers	CHL	72	41	52	93	43	6	4	7	11	4
1972–73	Boston Bruins	NHL	64	24	26	50	18	5	2	1	3	0
1972–73	Boston Braves	AHL	8	5	5	10	2	—	—	—	—	—
1973–74	Boston Bruins	NHL	75	16	31	47	21	16	11	8	19	4
1974–75	Boston Bruins	NHL	76	30	48	78	19	3	3	1	4	5
1975–76	Boston Bruins	NHL	70	31	43	74	28	12	5	6	11	6
1976–77	Boston Bruins	NHL	77	31	36	67	20	14	5	7	12	8
1977–78	Boston Bruins	NHL	54	23	36	59	24	15	2	10	12	6
1978–79	Pittsburgh Penguins	NHL	60	15	22	37	9	7	1	2	3	0
1979–80	Pittsburgh Penguins	NHL	76	13	24	37	20	5	1	1	2	0
1980–81	Pittsburgh Penguins	NHL	47	11	17	28	49	5	2	4	6	2
1981–82	Pittsburgh Penguins	NHL	58	11	10	21	35	—	—	—	—	—
CHL totals			209	92	131	223	107	11	6	10	16	9
NHL totals			657	205	293	498	243	82	32	40	72	31

Preceded by^{(Shared)} Andre Dupont; Peter McDuffe; Gerry Ouellette; Joe Zanussi	CHL Most Valuable Player Award; 1971–72	Succeeded by Michel Cormier
