= Herb Howdle =

Canadian ice hockey player

- Born: February 7, 1949 (age 76); Lloydminster, Saskatchewan, Canada
- Height: 5 ft 10 in (178 cm)
- Weight: 185 lb (84 kg; 13 st 3 lb)
- Position: Defence
- Shot: Left
- Played for: Oklahoma City Blazers (CHL); Dayton Gems (IHL); Boston Braves (AHL); Fort Wayne Komets (IHL)
- WHA draft: Rounds 71+, 1972; Calgary Broncos
- Playing career: 1968–1975

Herb Howdle (born February 7, 1949) is a Canadian former professional ice hockey defenceman. He was selected by the Calgary Broncos in the late rounds of the 1972 WHA General Player Draft.

== Awards and honours ==
Award	Year	Ref
WCHL All-Star Team	1968-69	
Gary F. Longman Memorial Trophy - IHL Rookie of the Year	1970–71	
