= Ray Martynuik =

Canadian ice hockey player (1950–2013)

- Born: March 28, 1950 Flin Flon, MB, CAN
- Died: October 20, 2013 (aged 63) Boquete, Chiriquí, Panama
- Height: 5 ft 10 in (178 cm)
- Weight: 165 lb (75 kg; 11 st 11 lb)
- Position: Goaltender
- Played for: Montreal Voyageurs (AHL); Baltimore Clippers (AHL); Springfield Kings (AHL); Kansas City Blues (CHL); Oklahoma City Blazers (CHL); Salt Lake Golden Eagles (CHL); Tucson Mavericks (CHL); Columbus Golden Seals (IHL); Columbus Owls (IHL); Grand Rapids Owls (IHL); Seattle Totems (WHL)
- NHL draft: 5th overall, 1970; Montreal Canadiens
- Playing career: 1970–1979

Ray Martynuik (March 28, 1950 – October 20, 2013), sometimes spelled Martyniuk, was a professional ice hockey goaltender. He was born in Flin Flon, Manitoba, and played for the Flin Flon Bombers in the Western Canada Hockey League, where he earned the nickname "Can't Miss Kid". He won the WCHL Top Goaltender Award in the 1968–69 and 1969–70 seasons, helping his team win the President's Cup, the league championship, in both seasons. Martynuik was drafted in the first round, fifth overall, by the Montreal Canadiens in the 1970 NHL Amateur Draft. At the time, this was the second highest selection of a goaltender in draft history.

Martynuik never played in the National Hockey League, however, spending his career playing for various minor-league teams. He reported to the Canadiens' training camp that year, but was unable to secure a position on the team while competing against fellow goaltenders Ken Dryden and Rogie Vachon. Instead, he was sent to the American Hockey League (AHL)'s Montreal Voyageurs, where he played ten games. From there, he went to the Kansas City Blues in the Central Hockey League (CHL) before finishing the season with the Seattle Totems of the now-defunct Western Hockey League. After trying out for the Canadiens again in 1971, he played for the Baltimore Clippers in the AHL and the CHL's Oklahoma City Blazers before the Canadiens organization traded his rights to the California Golden Seals, who assigned him to their International Hockey League affiliate in Columbus. In 1972, he was drafted by the Calgary Broncos in the 17th round of the World Hockey Association (WHA)'s General Player Draft, but he did not sign with the team.

After spending part of the 1972–73 season with Columbus, Martynuik was sent to the WHL's Salt Lake Golden Eagles, where he found some success and was named an all-star. He received an offer from the WHA's Chicago Cougars and signed with the team, but the club folded before Martynuik could play with the team. After returning to Salt Lake City, he was called up to the NHL by the Seals, but he did not have any playing time.

Martynuik spent the next few years playing mainly in Salt Lake City, with stints playing for the AHL's Springfield Kings, the IHL's Columbus Owls, and the CHL's Tucson Mavericks interspersed. In 1977, he joined the senior amateur Western International Hockey League's Cranbrook Royals. Returning to Cranbrook after the Royals lost the championship series, he asked the bus driver to stop the bus. Martynuik threw his goaltending equipment into Moyie Lake. The following year, he played five games for the IHL's Grand Rapids Owls before retiring from hockey.

Following his hockey career, Martynuik lived in Cranbrook and worked for Coca-Cola, maintaining its local vending machines. He supported the Children's Wish Foundation of Canada and Canadian Cancer Society, raising over $600,000 by organizing charity golf tournaments.

Martynuik moved to Panama, where he stayed until his death on October 20, 2013.

== Awards ==
- WCHL All-Star Team – 1969 & 1970

Preceded by Marc Tardif	Montreal Canadiens first-round draft pick 1970	Succeeded by Chuck Lefley
