= Ernie Moser =

Canadian ice hockey player (born 1949)

- Born: April 30, 1949 (age 77) Mendham, Saskatchewan, Canada
- Height: 6 ft 0 in (183 cm)
- Weight: 178 lb (81 kg; 12 st 10 lb)
- Position: Right wing
- Shot: Right
- NHL draft: 9th overall, 1969; Toronto Maple Leafs
- Playing career: 1969–1977

Ernie Moser (born April 30, 1949) is a Canadian former professional ice hockey right winger who was drafted 9th overall in the 1969 NHL Amateur Draft by the Toronto Maple Leafs.

== Career statistics ==
			Regular season					Playoffs
Season	Team	League	GP	G	A	Pts	PIM	GP	G	A	Pts	PIM
1967–68	Estevan Bruins	WCHL	58	26	35	61	72	—	—	—	—	—
1968–69	Estevan Bruins	WCHL	56	46	40	86	41	—	—	—	—	—
1969–70	Tulsa Oilers	CHL	55	10	18	28	24	1	0	0	0	0
1970–71	Tulsa Oilers	CHL	61	12	7	19	8	—	—	—	—	—
1971–72	Nelson Maple Leafs	WIHL	—	24	36	63	—	—	—	—	—	—
1972–73	Flint Generals	IHL	71	37	54	91	26	5	1	2	3	0
1973–74	Flint Generals	IHL	72	20	34	54	18	7	1	4	5	2
1974–75	Muskegon Mohawks	IHL	72	34	41	75	32	12	11	9	20	2
1974–75	Springfield Indians	AHL	—	—	—	—	—	4	0	0	0	0
1975–76	Muskegon Mohawks	IHL	70	36	33	69	22	5	1	1	2	2
1976–77	Muskegon Mohawks	IHL	40	9	19	28	4	—	—	—	—	—
1976–77	Grand Rapids Blades	USHL	6	12	5	17	2	—	—	—	—	—
IHL totals			325	136	181	317	102	17	3	7	10	4

Preceded by Brad Selwood	Toronto Maple Leafs first-round draft pick 1969	Succeeded by Darryl Sittler
