= Gerry Pinder =

Canadian ice hockey player

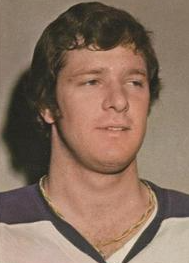
- Pinder in 1973–74
- Born: September 15, 1948 (age 78) Saskatoon, Saskatchewan, Canada
- Height: 5 ft 8 in (173 cm)
- Weight: 170 lb (77 kg; 12 st 2 lb)
- Position: Right wing
- Shot: Right
- Played for: Chicago Black Hawks; California Golden Seals; Cleveland Crusaders; San Diego Mariners; Edmonton Oilers
- National team: Canada
- NHL draft: Undrafted
- Playing career: 1969–1978
Medal record
Men's Ice hockey
Bronze medal – third place	1968 Grenoble	Ice hockey

Allan Gerald "Mouse" Pinder (born September 15, 1948) is a Canadian former professional ice hockey player who played 353 games in the World Hockey Association and 223 games in the National Hockey League. He played for the Chicago Black Hawks, California Golden Seals, San Diego Mariners, Cleveland Crusaders, and Edmonton Oilers. He also played for Canada at the 1968 Winter Olympics, winning bronze, and at the 1969 World Championships.

He later became a broadcaster on the Edmonton Oilers' local telecasts and for the CBC's Hockey Night in Canada.

== Career statistics ==
=== Regular season and playoffs ===
			Regular season					Playoffs
Season	Team	League	GP	G	A	Pts	PIM	GP	G	A	Pts	PIM
1964–65	Nutana Nats	SAHA	—	—	—	—	—	—	—	—	—	—
1964–65	Saskatoon Blades	SJHL	1	0	0	0	0	—	—	—	—	—
1965–66	Saskatoon Blades	SJHL	58	34	47	81	66	5	1	2	3	9
1966–67	Saskatoon Blades	CMJHL	55	78	62	140	95	4	4	1	5	4
1967–68	Winnipeg Nationals	WCSHL	25	11	14	25	12	—	—	—	—	—
1968–69	Canadian National Team	Intl	—	—	—	—	—	—	—	—	—	—
1969–70	Chicago Black Hawks	NHL	75	19	20	39	41	8	0	4	4	4
1970–71	Chicago Black Hawks	NHL	74	13	18	31	35	9	0	0	0	2
1971–72	California Golden Seals	NHL	74	23	31	54	59	—	—	—	—	—
1972–73	Cleveland Crusaders	WHA	78	30	36	66	21	9	2	9	11	30
1973–74	Cleveland Crusaders	WHA	73	23	33	56	90	1	0	0	0	0
1974–75	Cleveland Crusaders	WHA	74	13	28	41	71	5	3	1	4	6
1975–76	Cleveland Crusaders	WHA	79	21	30	51	118	3	0	0	0	4
1976–77	San Diego Mariners	WHA	44	6	13	19	36	—	—	—	—	—
1976–77	Maine Nordiques	NAHL	11	6	3	9	4	10	8	2	10	12
1977–78	Edmonton Oilers	WHA	5	0	1	1	0	—	—	—	—	—
NHL totals			223	55	69	124	135	17	0	4	4	6
WHA totals			353	93	141	234	336	18	5	10	15	40

=== International ===
Year	Team	Event	GP	G	A	Pts	PIM
1968	Canada	OG	7	1	0	1	2
1969	Canada	WC	10	3	1	4	14
Senior totals			17	4	1	5	16

== Awards ==
- CMJHL First All-Star Team – 1967
