= Morris Mott =

Canadian ice hockey player

- Born: May 25, 1946 (age 79) Creelman, Saskatchewan, Canada
- Height: 5 ft 8 in (173 cm)
- Weight: 165 lb (75 kg; 11 st 11 lb)
- Position: Right wing
- Shot: Left
- Played for: Winnipeg Jets; California Golden Seals
- National team: Canada
- Playing career: 1972–1977

Olympic medal record

Men's Ice hockey
Bronze medal – third place	1968 Grenoble	Ice hockey

Morris Kenneth Mott (born May 25, 1946) is a Canadian former professional ice hockey player who played 199 games in the National Hockey League. He played with the Winnipeg Jets of the World Hockey Association and the California Golden Seals of the NHL. He joined the Canadian national team in 1965, playing with the team until it was dissolved in 1970. After completing his hockey career Mott earned a PhD, and taught sports history at Brandon University.

He is the brother of Darwin Mott, who played one game in the WHA; the two played together for Västra Frölunda IF in Sweden in 1975-76.

== Academic career ==
Besides a BA and an MA degree from the University of Manitoba, he also obtained a PhD degree in sports history from Queen's University at Kingston in 1982. Mott is a professor emeritus of the Department of History at Brandon University in Brandon, Manitoba.

== Career statistics ==
=== Regular season and playoffs ===
			Regular season					Playoffs
Season	Team	League	GP	G	A	Pts	PIM	GP	G	A	Pts	PIM
1963–64	Weyburn Red Wings	SJHL	62	19	30	49	16	8	0	7	7	0
1964–65	Weyburn Red Wings	SJHL	34	21	52	73	12	15	11	21	32	10
1965–66	Canadian National Team	Intl	—	—	—	—	—	—	—	—	—	—
1966–67	Canadian National Team	Intl	—	—	—	—	—	—	—	—	—	—
1967–68	Winnipeg Nationals	WCSHL	15	13	9	22	14	—	—	—	—	—
1967–68	Canadian National Team	Intl	—	—	—	—	—	—	—	—	—	—
1968–69	Canadian National Team	Intl	—	—	—	—	—	—	—	—	—	—
1969–70	Canadian National Team	Intl	—	—	—	—	—	—	—	—	—	—
1970–71	Queen's University	CIAU	20	14	30	44	6	—	—	—	—	—
1971–72	Queen's University	CIAU	20	12	22	34	6	—	—	—	—	—
1972–73	Salt Lake Golden Eagles	WHL	6	8	5	13	0	—	—	—	—	—
1972–73	California Golden Seals	NHL	70	6	7	13	8	—	—	—	—	—
1973–74	California Golden Seals	NHL	77	9	17	26	33	—	—	—	—	—
1974–75	Salt Lake Golden Eagles	CHL	11	6	2	8	12	11	2	7	9	8
1974–75	California Golden Seals	NHL	52	3	8	11	8	—	—	—	—	—
1975–76	Västra Frölunda IF	SWE	36	16	14	30	62	—	—	—	—	—
1976–77	Winnipeg Jets	WHA	2	0	1	1	5	—	—	—	—	—
1976–77	Transcona Chargers	CASH	—	—	—	—	—	—	—	—	—	—
1977–78	University of Manitoba	CIAU	—	—	—	—	—	—	—	—	—	—
WHA totals			2	0	1	1	5	—	—	—	—	—
NHL totals			199	18	32	50	49	—	—	—	—	—

=== International ===
Year	Team	Event	GP	G	A	Pts	PIM
1966	Canada	WC	7	3	0	3	0
1967	Canada	WC	7	4	1	5	4
1968	Canada	OLY	7	5	1	6	2
1969	Canada	WC	10	2	2	4	4
Senior totals			31	14	4	18	10
