= Gerry Hart =

Canadian ice hockey player (1948–2023)

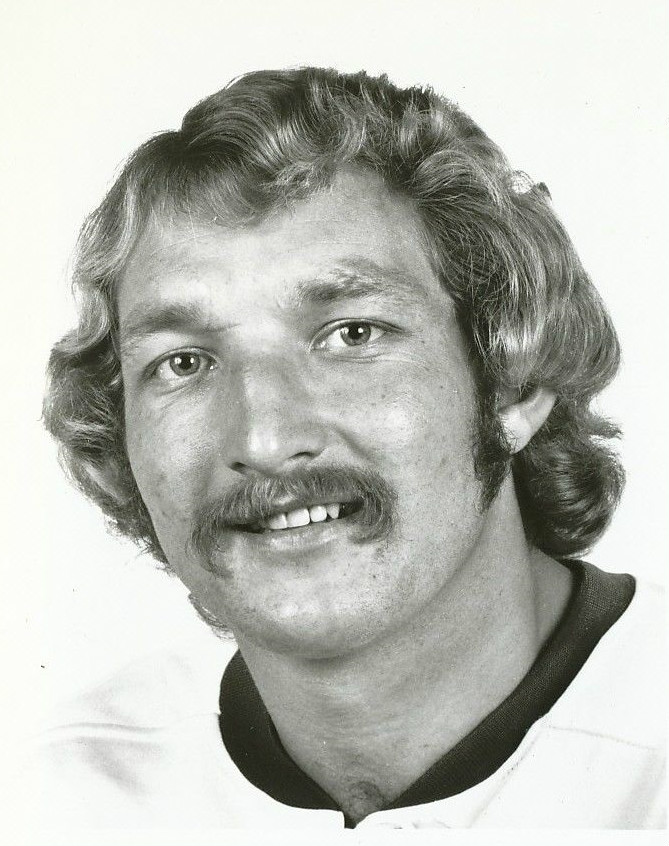
- Hart in 1973
- Born: January 1, 1948 Flin Flon, Manitoba, Canada
- Died: May 12, 2023 (aged 75) Florida,U.S.
- Height: 5 ft 9 in (175 cm)
- Weight: 190 lb (86 kg; 13 st 8 lb)
- Position: Defence
- Shot: Left
- Played for: Detroit Red Wings; New York Islanders; Quebec Nordiques; St. Louis Blues
- NHL draft: Undrafted
- Playing career: 1968–1982

Gerald William Hart (January 1, 1948 – May 12, 2023) was a Canadian professional ice hockey player who played 730 games in the National Hockey League (NHL) with the Detroit Red Wings, New York Islanders, Quebec Nordiques, and St. Louis Blues between 1969 and 1982. He reached the NHL playoff semifinals four times in five seasons with the Islanders.

In 1979 he joined the Nordiques, who claimed him in the 1979 NHL expansion draft.

Hart retired from the NHL in 1982 and began living off his investments.

In October 1992, Hart, along with college roommates Thomas Mattioli and Randolph Nash, opened The Rinx recreation complex in Hidden Pond Park in Hauppauge, New York with a 20-year land lease from the Town of Islip. On May 26, 2004, Hart sold the popular ice rink and day camp to Francis J. Palamara, a business consultant, who formerly served as Executive Vice President for Aramark.

Hart died on May 12, 2023, at the age of 75.

== Career statistics ==
=== Regular season and playoffs ===
			Regular season					Playoffs
Season	Team	League	GP	G	A	Pts	PIM	GP	G	A	Pts	PIM
1964–65	Flin Flon Bombers	SJHL	2	0	0	0	0	1	0	0	0	2
1965–66	Flin Flon Bombers	SJHL	57	7	10	17	170	—	—	—	—	—
1966–67	Flin Flon Bombers	MJHL	46	22	28	50	189	14	5	14	19	90
1966–67	Flin Flon Bombers	M-Cup	—	—	—	—	—	6	1	2	3	48
1966–67	Port Arthur Marrs	M-Cup	—	—	—	—	—	5	0	2	2	23
1967–68	Flin Flon Bombers	WCHL	58	13	38	51	290	15	1	7	8	43
1968–69	Fort Worth Wings	CHL	26	2	3	5	52	—	—	—	—	—
1968–69	Baltimore Clippers	AHL	38	2	6	8	88	4	0	1	1	23
1968–69	Detroit Red Wings	NHL	1	0	0	0	2	—	—	—	—	—
1969–70	Fort Worth Wings	CHL	64	2	19	21	226	7	0	4	4	26
1969–70	Detroit Red Wings	NHL	3	0	0	0	2	—	—	—	—	—
1970–71	Detroit Red Wings	NHL	64	2	7	9	148	—	—	—	—	—
1971–72	Tidewater Wings	AHL	28	4	9	13	146	—	—	—	—	—
1971–72	Fort Worth Wings	CHL	14	1	4	5	84	—	—	—	—	—
1971–72	Detroit Red Wings	NHL	3	0	0	0	0	—	—	—	—	—
1972–73	New York Islanders	NHL	47	1	11	12	158	—	—	—	—	—
1973–74	New York Islanders	NHL	70	1	10	11	61	—	—	—	—	—
1974–75	New York Islanders	NHL	71	4	14	18	143	17	2	2	4	42
1975–76	New York Islanders	NHL	80	6	18	24	151	13	1	3	4	24
1976–77	New York Islanders	NHL	80	4	18	22	98	12	0	2	2	23
1977–78	New York Islanders	NHL	78	2	23	25	94	7	0	0	0	16
1978–79	New York Islanders	NHL	50	2	14	16	78	9	0	2	2	10
1979–80	Quebec Nordiques	NHL	71	3	23	26	59	—	—	—	—	—
1980–81	Nova Scotia Voyageurs	AHL	2	0	3	3	2	—	—	—	—	—
1980–81	Quebec Nordiques	NHL	6	0	0	0	10	—	—	—	—	—
1980–81	St. Louis Blues	NHL	63	4	11	15	132	10	0	0	0	27
1981–82	St. Louis Blues	NHL	35	0	1	1	102	10	0	3	3	33
1982–83	St. Louis Blues	NHL	8	0	0	0	2	—	—	—	—	—
NHL totals			730	29	150	179	1240	78	3	12	15	175

== Awards and achievements ==
- MJHL First All-Star Team (1967)
- Turnbull Cup MJHL Championship (1967)
- WCJHL First All-Star Team (1968)
- Honoured Member of the Manitoba Hockey Hall of Fame
- Suffolk Sports Hall of Fame on Long Island in the Hockey Category with the Class of 1997.
