= Morris Stefaniw =

- Born: January 10, 1948 (age 77) North Battleford, Saskatchewan, Canada
- Height: 5 ft 11 in (180 cm)
- Weight: 170 lb (77 kg; 12 st 2 lb)
- Position: Center
- Shot: Left
- Played for: Atlanta Flames
- Playing career: 1964–1976

Morris Alexander Stefaniw (born January 10, 1948) is a Canadian former professional ice hockey centreman. During the 1972–73 season, he appeared in 13 games for the NHL's Atlanta Flames. Born in North Battleford, Saskatchewan, his lone NHL goal was the first goal in Flames' history and the first goal in the history of the Nassau Veterans Memorial Coliseum, during a 3–2 victory over the New York Islanders on October 7, 1972.

After his stint with the Flames, they sent him down to the Nova Scotia Voyageurs of the American Hockey League, the top farm club of the Montreal Canadiens, where he teamed up with Yvon Lambert (left wing) and Tony Featherstone (right wing), to become one of the most productive scoring lines in American Hockey League history. The three players combined for 131 goals and 177 assists, for 308 points, in the 1972–73 regular season, and 27 goals and 39 assists, for 66 points, in just 13 playoff games. The three players finished 1 (Lambert 104 points), 2 (Featherstone 103 points, 3 (Stefaniw 101 points) in the AHL scoring race that season. For a number of years, his 71 assists from that year was the team record.

== Career statistics ==
=== Regular season and playoffs ===
			Regular season					Playoffs
Season	Team	League	GP	G	A	Pts	PIM	GP	G	A	Pts	PIM
1964–65	Estevan Bruins	SJHL	54	52	44	96	0	—	—	—	—	—
1965–66	Estevan Bruins	SJHL	—	—	—	—	—	—	—	—	—	—
1966–67	Estevan Bruins	CMJHL	55	36	58	94	44	—	—	—	—	—
1967–68	Oklahoma City Blazers	CHL	37	11	15	26	11	—	—	—	—	—
1967–68	Phoenix Roadrunners	WHL	17	8	0	8	2	4	0	0	0	2
1968–69	Phoenix Roadrunners	WHL	68	12	15	27	50	—	—	—	—	—
1969–70	Phoenix Roadrunners	WHL	72	7	22	29	33	—	—	—	—	—
1970–71	Omaha Knights	CHL	70	19	41	60	98	11	7	9	16	6
1971–72	Providence Reds	AHL	70	11	20	31	16	5	3	3	6	12
1972–73	Nova Scotia Voyageurs	AHL	64	30	71	101	80	13	8	17	25	12
1972–73	Atlanta Flames	NHL	13	1	1	2	2	—	—	—	—	—
1973–74	Nova Scotia Voyageurs	AHL	27	3	12	15	42	—	—	—	—	—
1973–74	Albuquerque Six-Guns	CHL	41	7	22	29	24	—	—	—	—	—
1974–75	Baltimore Clippers	AHL	46	11	18	29	50	—	—	—	—	—
1974–75	Johnstown Jets	NAHL	17	1	5	6	6	—	—	—	—	—
1975–76	Baltimore Clippers	AHL	76	7	39	46	48	—	—	—	—	—
NHL totals			13	1	1	2	2	—	—	—	—	—

== Awards ==
- CMJHL First All-Star Team – 1967
