= Herb Pinder (ice hockey) =

Canadian ice hockey player

- Born: December 24, 1946 (age 78); Boston, Massachusetts, United States
- Height: 5 ft 11 in (180 cm)
- Weight: 170 lb (77 kg; 12 st 2 lb)
- Position: Centre
- Played for: Vancouver Canucks
- National team: Canada
- Playing career: 1967–1970

Olympic medal record

Men's Ice Hockey

Representing Canada
Bronze medal – third place	1968 Grenoble	Team

Herbert Charles Pinder (born 24 December 1946) is a Canadian former ice hockey player who competed in the 1968 Winter Olympics. After his playing career he earned a Master of Business Administration from Harvard University and became a player agent.

Pinder was born on 24 December 1946 in Boston, Massachusetts, United States and raised in Saskatoon, Saskatchewan, Canada. During his junior career he attended the University of Saskatchewan.

In 2017, the University of Saskatchewan gave Pinder a "salute" for his stature in the business community and for his volunteerism. He received an honorary degree from the university.

== Awards ==
- CMJHL Second All-Star Team – 1967
