= Bernie Blanchette =

Canadian ice hockey player (1947–2006)

- Born: July 11, 1947 North Battleford, Saskatchewan, Canada
- Died: August 25, 2006 (aged 59) Winnipeg, Manitoba, Canada
- Height: 6 ft 0 in (183 cm)
- Weight: 165 lb (75 kg; 11 st 11 lb)
- Position: Right wing
- Shot: Right
- Played for: WHA; Chicago Cougars; Alberta Oilers
- WHA draft: Undrafted
- Playing career: 1968–1974

Bernard Robert Blanchette (July 11, 1947 – August 25, 2006) was a Canadian professional ice hockey player. During the 1972–73 season, Blanchette played 47 games in the World Hockey Association with the Chicago Cougars and Alberta Oilers, scoring 7 goals and 7 assists. After his retirement from professional hockey, he joined the RCMP.

== Career statistics ==
=== Regular season and playoffs ===
			Regular season					Playoffs
Season	Team	League	GP	G	A	Pts	PIM	GP	G	A	Pts	PIM
1964–65	Regina Pats	SJHL	53	10	14	24	16	––	––	––	––	––
1966–67	Saskatoon Blades	CMJHL	42	45	31	76	66	––	––	––	––	––
1967–68	Saskatoon Blades	WCJHL	58	52	72	124	31	––	––	––	––	––
1968–69	Muskegon Mohawks	IHL	67	36	41	77	16	11	7	5	12	4
1969–70	Muskegon Mohawks	IHL	66	48	54	102	21	6	1	1	2	0
1969–70	Montreal Voyageurs	AHL	5	2	3	5	0	––	––	––	––	––
1970–71	Montreal Voyageurs	AHL	32	6	10	16	20	3	0	1	1	0
1971–72	Nova Scotia Voyageurs	AHL	4	0	2	2	2	––	––	––	––	––
1971–72	Kansas City Blues	CHL	43	24	21	45	40	––	––	––	––	––
1972–73	Chicago Cougars	WHA	24	2	3	5	8	––	––	––	––	––
1972–73	Alberta Oilers	WHA	23	5	4	9	2	––	––	––	––	––
1973–74	Winston–Salem Polar Twins	SHL	62	39	38	77	11	7	3	4	7	0
WHA totals			47	7	7	14	10	—	—	—	—	—

== Awards ==
- WCJHL Second All-Star Team – 1968
