= Dale Hoganson =

Canadian ice hockey player

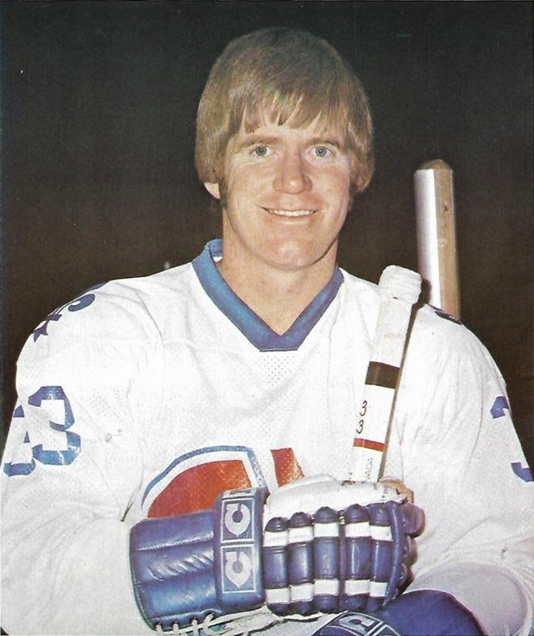
- Hoganson in 1979 photo
- Born: July 8, 1949 (age 76) North Battleford, Saskatchewan, Canada
- Height: 5 ft 10 in (178 cm)
- Weight: 190 lb (86 kg; 13 st 8 lb)
- Position: Defence
- Shot: Left
- Played for: Los Angeles Kings; Montreal Canadiens; Quebec Nordiques; Birmingham Bulls
- NHL draft: 16th overall, 1969; Los Angeles Kings
- Playing career: 1969–1982

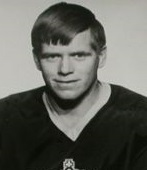
Hoganson in 1969

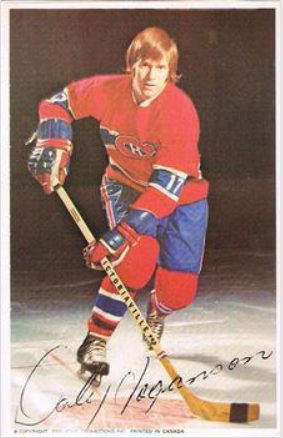
1971-72 card of Hoganson for Montreal Canadiens

Dale Gordon Hoganson (born July 8, 1949) is a Canadian former professional ice hockey player who played 344 games in the National Hockey League and 378 games in the World Hockey Association between 1969 and 1982. He played for the Los Angeles Kings, Montreal Canadiens, Quebec Nordiques, and Birmingham Bulls. He was traded along with Denis DeJordy, Noel Price and Doug Robinson from the Kings to the Canadiens for Rogie Vachon on November 4, 1971. In 1973 Dale was included with Montreal Canadiens official Stanley Cup winning picture, and was awarded a Stanley Cup ring. His name was left off the Stanley Cup, because did not officially qualify. He is cousin with Paul Hoganson.

== Career statistics ==
=== Regular season and playoffs ===
			Regular season					Playoffs
Season	Team	League	GP	G	A	Pts	PIM	GP	G	A	Pts	PIM
1964–65	Estevan Bruins	SJHL	3	0	0	0	0	2	0	0	0	4
1965–66	Estevan Bruins	SJHL	56	15	18	33	19	12	0	0	0	6
1965–66	Estevan Bruins	M-Cup	—	—	—	—	—	11	3	4	7	10
1966–67	Estevan Bruins	CMJHL	55	3	17	20	35	13	2	3	5	21
1967–68	Estevan Bruins	WCHL	56	19	40	59	36	14	9	13	22	4
1967–68	Estevan Bruins	M-Cup	—	—	—	—	—	14	7	10	17	8
1968–69	Estevan Bruins	WCHL	54	16	44	60	67	10	0	3	3	—
1968–69	Estevan Bruins	M-Cup	—	—	—	—	—	14	7	9	16	8
1969–70	Los Angeles Kings	NHL	49	1	7	8	37	—	—	—	—	—
1969–70	Springfield Kings	AHL	19	2	5	7	43	—	—	—	—	—
1970–71	Los Angeles Kings	NHL	70	4	10	14	52	—	—	—	—	—
1971–72	Los Angeles Kings	NHL	10	1	2	3	14	—	—	—	—	—
1971–72	Montreal Canadiens	NHL	21	0	0	0	2	—	—	—	—	—
1971–72	Nova Scotia Voyageurs	AHL	13	3	4	7	11	—	—	—	—	—
1972–73	Montreal Canadiens	NHL	25	0	2	2	2	—	—	—	—	—
1973–74	Quebec Nordiques	WHA	62	8	33	41	27	—	—	—	—	—
1974–75	Quebec Nordiques	WHA	78	9	35	44	47	13	1	3	4	4
1975–76	Quebec Nordiques	WHA	45	3	14	17	18	5	1	3	4	2
1976–77	Birmingham Bulls	WHA	81	7	48	55	48	—	—	—	—	—
1977–78	Birmingham Bulls	WHA	43	1	12	13	29	5	0	0	0	7
1978–79	Quebec Nordiques	WHA	69	2	19	21	17	4	0	0	0	2
1979–80	Quebec Nordiques	NHL	77	4	36	40	31	—	—	—	—	—
1980–81	Quebec Nordiques	NHL	61	3	14	17	32	5	0	3	3	10
1981–82	Quebec Nordiques	NHL	30	0	6	6	16	6	0	0	0	2
1981–82	Fredericton Express	AHL	19	2	4	6	18	—	—	—	—	—
WHA totals			378	30	161	191	186	27	2	6	8	15
NHL totals			343	13	77	90	186	11	0	3	3	12

== Awards ==
- WCJHL First All-Star Team – 1968
- WCHL All-Star Team – 1969
