= 1967 Allan Cup =

Canadian senior ice hockey championship

The Allan Cup trophy

The 1967 Allan Cup was the Canadian senior ice hockey championship for the 1966–67 senior "A" season. The event was hosted by – and won by – the Drummondville Eagles in Drummondville, Quebec. The 1967 playoff marked the 59th time that the Allan Cup has been awarded.

== Teams ==
- Drummondville Eagles (Eastern Canadian Champions)
- Calgary Spurs (Western Canadian Champions)

== Playdowns ==
=== Allan Cup Best-of-Seven Series ===
Drummondville Eagles 4 - Calgary Spurs 0
Drummondville Eagles 3 - Calgary Spurs 2
Drummondville Eagles 8 - Calgary Spurs 4
Drummondville Eagles 4 - Calgary Spurs 0

=== Eastern Playdowns ===
Quarter-final

Moncton Hawks defeated Conception Bay Cee Bees 3-games-to-1

Conception Bay Cee Bees 6 - Moncton Hawks 4
Moncton Hawks 6 - Conception Bay Cee Bees 2
Moncton Hawks 5 - Conception Bay Cee Bees 3
Moncton Hawks 3 - Conception Bay Cee Bees 2

Central Semi-final

Kingston Aces defeated Morrisburg Combines 4-games-to-1

Morrisburg Combines 8 - Kingston Aces 5
Kingston Aces 7 - Morrisburg Combines 5
Kingston Aces 6 - Morrisburg Combines 2
Kingston Aces 8 - Morrisburg Combines 3
Kingston Aces 7 - Morrisburg Combines 6

East Semi-final

Drummondville Eagles defeated Moncton Hawks 3-games-to-none

Drummondville Eagles 3 - Moncton Hawks 2
Drummondville Eagles 9 - Moncton Hawks 0
Drummondville Eagles 6 - Moncton Hawks 4

Final

Drummondville Eagles defeated Kingston Aces 4-games-to-1

Drummondville Eagles 4 - Kingston Aces 1
Drummondville Eagles 5 - Kingston Aces 3
Drummondville Eagles 4 - Kingston Aces 3
Kingston Aces 1 - Drummondville Eagles 0
Drummondville Eagles 3 - Kingston Aces 1

=== Western Playdowns ===
Quarter-final

Winnipeg Maroons defeated Port Arthur Bearcats 3-games-to-none

Winnipeg Maroons 7 - Port Arthur Bearcats 2
Winnipeg Maroons 8 - Port Arthur Bearcats 1
Winnipeg Maroons 7 - Port Arthur Bearcats 5

Pacific Semi-final

Nelson Maple Leafs defeated Drumheller Miners 3-games-to-1

Nelson Maple Leafs 4 - Drumheller Miners 1
Nelson Maple Leafs 4 - Drumheller Miners 1
Drumheller Miners 9 - Nelson Maple Leafs 5
Nelson Maple Leafs 6 - Drumheller Miners 1

West Semi-final

Calgary Spurs defeated Winnipeg Maroons 3-games-to-1

Calgary Spurs 4 - Winnipeg Maroons 2
Calgary Spurs 7 - Winnipeg Maroons 4
Winnipeg Maroons 5 - Calgary Spurs 2
Calgary Spurs 5 - Winnipeg Maroons 0

Final

Calgary Spurs defeated Nelson Maple Leafs 3-games-to-none

Calgary Spurs 5 - Nelson Maple Leafs 3
Calgary Spurs 4 - Nelson Maple Leafs 1
Calgary Spurs 7 - Nelson Maple Leafs 6
