= 1966–67 CMJHL season =

First season of Canadian hockey league

- League: Western Hockey League
- Sport: Ice hockey
- Teams: 7

Regular season
- Season champions: Edmonton Oil Kings (1)
- Season MVP: Gerry Pinder (Saskatoon Blades)
- Top scorer: Gerry Pinder (Saskatoon Blades)

Playoffs
- Finals champions: Moose Jaw Canucks (1)
- Runners-up: Regina Pats

WHL seasons
- League founded 1967–68

The 1966–67 CMJHL season was the inaugural season of the Canadian Major Junior Hockey League. The fledgling league was formed by five members of the former Saskatchewan Junior Hockey League, along with the Edmonton Oil Kings and the Calgary Buffaloes. However, the league did not receive the sanction of the Canadian Amateur Hockey Association, and was considered an "outlaw league" whose members were ineligible to compete for the Memorial Cup.

The CMJHL's inaugural season featured seven teams based in Alberta and Saskatchewan and a 56-game schedule. The Oil Kings topped the regular season standings with 34 wins; however, the Oil Kings were upset in the playoffs by the Moose Jaw Canucks, who went on to win the President's Cup, defeating the Regina Pats in the league final.

== Regular season ==
=== Final standings ===
League standings
Pos	Team	Pld	W	L	T	GF	GA	Pts
1	Edmonton Oil Kings	56	34	12	10	281	188	78
2	Estevan Bruins	56	33	18	5	273	197	71
3	Regina Pats	56	31	18	7	324	230	69
4	Moose Jaw Canucks	56	25	19	12	215	190	62
5	Saskatoon Blades	56	25	24	7	288	271	57
6	Weyburn Red Wings	56	16	30	10	271	274	42
7	Calgary Buffaloes	56	4	47	5	178	426	13

=== Scoring leaders ===
Note: GP = Games played; G = Goals; A = Assists; Pts = Points; PIM = Penalties in minutes

Player	Team	GP	G	A	Pts	PIM
Gerry Pinder	Saskatoon Blades	56	78	62	140	95
Rick Sentes	Regina Pats	56	66	61	127	100
Herb Pinder	Saskatoon Blades	49	44	75	119	113
Brian Lavander	Regina Pats	56	39	71	110	100
Ernie Hicke	Regina Pats	55	37	72	109	184
Ken Faranski	Regina Pats	42	40	54	99	28
Morris Stefaniw	Estevan Bruins	55	36	58	99	44
Garnet Bailey	Edmonton Oil Kings	56	47	46	93	177
Galen Head	Edmonton Oil Kings	56	50	42	92	43
Ron Walters	Edmonton Oil Kings	54	44	40	84	31
Grant Erickson	Estevan Bruins	55	35	49	84	49

== 1967 CMJHL playoffs ==
=== Quarterfinals ===
- Regina defeated Weyburn 4 games to 1
- Estevan defeated Saskatoon 3 games to 2, with 2 ties

=== Semifinals ===
- Moose Jaw defeated Edmonton 3 games to 2, with 4 ties
- Regina defeated Estevan 4 games to 1

=== Finals ===
- Moose Jaw defeated Regina 4 games to 1

== All-star game ==
The 1966–67 WCJHL all-star game was held in Calgary, Alberta, with the Reds defeating the Whites 7–0 before a crowd of 1,000.

== Awards ==
Most Valuable Player: Gerry Pinder, Saskatoon Blades
Top Scorer: Gerry Pinder, Saskatoon Blades
Most Sportsmanlike Player: Morris Stefaniw, Estevan Bruins
Defenseman of the Year: Barry Gibbs, Estevan Bruins
Rookie of the Year: Ron Garwasiuk, Regina Pats
Goaltender of the Year: Ken Brown, Moose Jaw Canucks
Regular Season Champions: Edmonton Oil Kings

== All-star teams ==
	First team		Second team	
Goal	Ken Brown	Moose Jaw Canucks	none (Brown received all goaltender votes)	
Defence	Barry Gibbs	Estevan Bruins	Ken Hodge	Moose Jaw Canucks
Defence	Ray McKay	Moose Jaw Canucks	Kerry Ketter	Edmonton Oil Kings
Centre	Morris Stefaniw	Estevan Bruins	Jim Harrison (tied)	Estevan Bruins
Centre	-	-	Herb Pinder (tied)	Saskatoon Blades
Left wing	Gerry Pinder	Saskatoon Blades	Bill Lesuk	Weyburn Red Wings
Right wing	Rick Sentes	Regina Pats	Galen Head	Edmonton Oil Kings

== See also ==
- 1966 in sports
- 1967 in sports

Preceded by None	WHL seasons	Succeeded by 1967–68 WCHL season
