= Western Canada Senior Hockey League (1965–1968) =

The Western Canada Senior Hockey League was a Canadian senior ice hockey league in the provinces of Alberta and Saskatchewan. The league lasted for three seasons from 1965-1968.

== Champions ==
- 1965–66: Calgary Spurs
- 1966–67: Calgary Spurs
- 1967–68: Saskatoon Quakers
