= 1967–68 WCHL season =

Junior ice hockey season

- League: Western Hockey League
- Sport: Ice hockey
- Teams: 11

Regular season
- Season champions: Flin Flon Bombers (1)
- Season MVP: Jim Harrison (Estevan Bruins)
- Top scorer: Bobby Clarke (Flin Flon Bombers)

Playoffs
- Finals champions: Estevan Bruins (1)
- Runners-up: Flin Flon Bombers

WHL seasons
- 1966–67 1968–69

The 1967–68 WCJHL season was the second season of the Western Canada Junior Hockey League (WCJHL). The league adopted its new name after being known as the Canadian Major Junior Hockey League in its inaugural season. The season featured eleven teams, up from seven during the inaugural season, and a 60-game regular season. The Flin Flon Bombers, playing their first season in the league, topped the season standings with 47 wins. In the playoffs, the Bombers faced the Estevan Bruins in the championship series. The Bruins won the series, claiming the President's Cup.

== League notes ==
The WCJHL added four new teams for its second season, including three based in Manitoba, increasing the league's presence across Western Canada. The Brandon Wheat Kings, Flin Flon Bombers, and Winnipeg Jets all joined in Manitoba, while the Swift Current Broncos became the league's sixth team based in Saskatchewan. The Calgary Buffaloes, meanwhile, adopted a new name, becoming the Calgary Centennials.

The league's name change reflected in part a temporary truce with the Canadian Amateur Hockey Association (CAHA), which had not sanctioned the Canadian Major Junior Hockey League upon its inception. The WCJHL agreed to abide by CAHA regulations, which could allow the league to receive development subsidies and the ability to compete for the Memorial Cup—the inaugural CMJHL champion Moose Jaw Canucks had been ineligible for the 1967 Memorial Cup. The agreement allowed the Estevan Bruins to contest the 1968 Memorial Cup; they would lose the final to the Niagara Falls Flyers.

This would be the only season for the league under the WCJHL name. After the season, the league dropped "Junior" from its name.

== Team changes ==
- The Calgary Buffaloes are renamed the Calgary Centennials.
- The Brandon Wheat Kings join the league as an expansion franchise.
- The Flin Flon Bombers join the league as an expansion franchise.
- The Swift Current Broncos join the league as an expansion franchise.
- The Winnipeg Jets join the league as an expansion franchise.

== Regular season ==
=== Final standings ===
League standings
Pos	Team	Pld	W	L	T	GF	GA	Pts
1	Flin Flon Bombers	60	47	8	5	361	143	99
2	Estevan Bruins	60	45	13	2	262	169	92
3	Edmonton Oil Kings	60	38	16	6	303	194	82
4	Moose Jaw Canucks	60	31	24	5	263	243	67
5	Regina Pats	60	29	23	8	246	237	66
6	Winnipeg Jets	60	27	26	7	276	362	61
7	Saskatoon Blades	60	20	31	9	260	362	49
8	Brandon Wheat Kings	60	21	33	6	238	279	48
9	Swift Current Broncos	60	16	38	6	242	343	38
10	Calgary Centennials	60	15	40	5	218	318	35
11	Weyburn Red Wings	60	9	46	5	236	395	23

=== Scoring leaders ===
Note: GP = Games played; G = Goals; A = Assists; Pts = Points; PIM = Penalties in minutes

Player	Team	GP	G	A	Pts	PIM
Bobby Clarke	Flin Flon Bombers	59	51	117	168	148
Reggie Leach	Flin Flon Bombers	59	87	44	131	208
Bernie Blanchette	Saskatoon Blades	58	52	72	124	31
Ron Snell	Regina Pats	60	56	55	111	86
Reg Bechtold	Moose Jaw Canucks	59	48?	51?	105?	158
Gene Peacosh	Swift Current Broncos	53	52	48	100	60
Ron Garwasiuk	Regina Pats	58	56	43	99	153
Mike Shaw	Saskatoon Blades	58	25	73	98	149
Dick Mortenson	Edmonton Oil Kings	60	53	40	93	37
Jim Benzelok	Winnipeg Jets	58	43	50	93	168

== 1968 WCJHL playoffs ==
=== Quarterfinals ===
- Flin Flon defeated Regina 4 games to 0
- Estevan defeated Winnipeg 4 games to 0
- Edmonton defeated Saskatoon 3 games to 2 with 2 ties
- Moose Jaw defeated Brandon 4 games to 3 with 1 tie

=== Semifinals ===
- Flin Flon defeated Edmonton 4 games to 1 with 1 tie
- Estevan defeated Moose Jaw 4 games to 0 with 1 tie

=== Finals ===
- Estevan defeated Flin Flon 4 games to 0 with 1 tie

== All-star game ==
The 1967–68 WCJHL all-star game was held in Estevan, Saskatchewan, with the WCJHL All-stars defeating the Estevan Bruins 8–7 before a crowd of 2500.

== Awards ==
Most Valuable Player: Jim Harrison, Estevan Bruins
Top Scorer: Bobby Clarke, Flin Flon Bombers
Most Sportsmanlike Player: Bernie Blanchette, Saskatoon Blades
Defenseman of the Year: Gerry Hart, Flin Flon Bombers
Rookie of the Year: Ron Fairbrother, Saskatoon Blades
Goaltender of the Year: Chris Worthy, Flin Flon Bombers
Regular Season Champions: Flin Flon Bombers

== All-star teams ==
	First team		Second team	
Goal	Chris Worthy	Flin Flon Bombers	Ken Brown	Moose Jaw Canucks
Defence	Gerry Hart	Flin Flon Bombers	Jim Pritchard	Winnipeg Jets
Defence	Dale Hoganson	Estevan Bruins	Joe Zanussi	Swift Current Broncos
Center	Bobby Clarke	Flin Flon Bombers	Jim Harrison	Estevan Bruins
Left wing	Ron Garwasiuk	Regina Pats	Cal Swenson	Flin Flon Bombers
Right wing	Reggie Leach	Flin Flon Bombers	Bernie Blanchette	Saskatoon Blades

== See also ==
- 1967 in sports
- 1968 in sports

Preceded by 1966–67 CMJHL season	WHL seasons	Succeeded by 1968–69 WCHL season
