= Merv Haney =

Canadian ice hockey player

- Born: August 13, 1949 (age 76) St. Lazare, Manitoba, Canada
- Height: 5 ft 11 in (180 cm)
- Weight: 185 lb (84 kg; 13 st 3 lb)
- Position: Defence
- Played for: WHA; Ottawa Nationals; EHL; Salem Rebels; Roanoke Valley Rebels; NAHL; Mohawk Valley Comets
- NHL draft: Undrafted
- Playing career: 1969–1976

Merv Haney (born August 13, 1949) is a Canadian former professional ice hockey defenceman.

During the 1972–73 season, Haney played seven games in the World Hockey Association with the Ottawa Nationals.

== Career statistics ==
=== Regular season and playoffs ===
			Regular season					Playoffs
Season	Team	League	GP	G	A	Pts	PIM	GP	G	A	Pts	PIM
1967–68	Winnipeg Jets	WCJHL	55	7	22	29	71	—	—	—	—	—
1968–69	Dauphin Kings	MJHL	Statistics Unavailable
1968–69	Winnipeg Jets	WCHL	16	2	3	5	34	—	—	—	—	—
1969–70	Guelph Beef Kings	WOJAHL	Statistics Unavailable
1969–70	Salem Rebels	EHL	22	2	4	6	66	—	—	—	—	—
1970–71	Roanoke Valley Rebels	EHL	7	1	1	2	21	—	—	—	—	—
1970–71	Soo Canadians	USHL	Statistics Unavailable
1971–72	Soo Canadians	USHL	Statistics Unavailable
1972–73	Ottawa Nationals	WHA	7	0	1	1	4	—	—	—	—	—
1972–73	Sault Ste. Marie Greyhounds	USHL	24	15	18	33	63	—	—	—	—	—
1973–74	Mohawk Valley Comets	NAHL	18	3	4	7	43	—	—	—	—	—
1973–74	Green Bay Bobcats	USHL	Statistics Unavailable
1974–75	Kimberley Dynamiters	WIHL	35	3	7	10	72	—	—	—	—	—
1975–76	Kimberley Dynamiters	WIHL	Statistics Unavailable
WHA totals			7	0	1	1	4	—	—	—	—	—
