= Calgary Broncos =

Canadian ice hockey prospective team (1971–1972)

- City: Calgary, Alberta, Canada
- League: WHA
- Founded: 1972
- Operated: Never Played
- Home arena: Stampede Corral
- Colours: Red, white
- Owner: Bob Brownridge

Franchise history
- 1972: Calgary Broncos
- 1972-1976: Cleveland Crusaders
- 1976-1977: Minnesota Fighting Saints

The Calgary Broncos were an original World Hockey Association franchise, founded November 1, 1971. In the first WHA draft, the Broncos chose Barry Gibbs, Jim Harrison, Dale Hoganson and Jack Norris. The team participated in the February 1972 WHA General Player Draft, but folded prior to the October 1972 start of the first WHA season when team owner Bob Brownridge died. The franchise licence was sold to businesspeople in Ohio, United States, who founded the Cleveland Crusaders, which played on the opening night of that inaugural WHA season.

The Broncos were established in anticipation of an Alberta rivalry with the Edmonton Oilers. After the team moved, the Edmonton Oilers were renamed Alberta Oilers with the intention of splitting their home games between Calgary and Edmonton. The Oilers ultimately did not play any home games in Calgary, and reverted to the name Edmonton Oilers after one season.

Calgary later joined the WHA in 1975 when the Vancouver Blazers relocated to become the Calgary Cowboys.

== See also ==
- List of ice hockey teams in Alberta
