= List of Edmonton Oilers records =

This is a list of franchise records for the Edmonton Oilers of the National Hockey League.

== All-time regular season leaders ==
=== Skaters ===
Current to the 2025–26 NHL season.

Games played
#	Player	GP	Seasons
1	Kevin Lowe	1,037	1979–92; 1996–98
2	Ryan Nugent-Hopkins	1,031	2011–present
3	Ryan Smyth	971	1994–07; 2011–14
4	Leon Draisaitl	855	1980–91; 1996
5	Mark Messier	851	1979–91
Active leader
2	Ryan Nugent-Hopkins	1,031	2011–present

Games played, same team
#	Player	GP	Seasons
1	Kevin Lowe	98 (VAN)	1979–92; 1996–98
2	Kevin Lowe	94 (CGY)	1979–92; 1996–98
3	Kevin Lowe	93 (LAK)	1979–92; 1996–98
4	Glenn Anderson	83 (CGY)	1980–91; 1996
5	Glenn Anderson	83 (LAK)	1980–91; 1996
Active leader
N/A	Ryan Nugent-Hopkins	63 (VAN)	2011–present

Goals
#	Player	G	Seasons
1	Wayne Gretzky	626*	1978–88
2	Jari Kurri	474	1980–90
3	Leon Draisaitl	434	2014–present
4	Glenn Anderson	417	1980–91; 1996
5	Connor McDavid	409	2015–present
Active leader
3	Leon Draisaitl	434	2014–present

*Included 43 WHA goals

Goals, same team
#	Player	G	Seasons
1	Wayne Gretzky	58 (LAK)	1979–88
2	Wayne Gretzky	57 (WIN)	1979–88
3	Jari Kurri	55 (VAN)	1980–90
4	Wayne Gretzky	50 (VAN)	1979–88
4	Mark Messier	50 (VAN)	1979–91
Active leader
N/A	Leon Draisaitl	30 (NSH)	2014–present

Assists
#	Player	A	Seasons
1	Wayne Gretzky	1,147*	1978–88
2	Connor McDavid	811	2015–present
3	Mark Messier	642	1979–91
4	Leon Draisaitl	619	2014–present
5	Jari Kurri	569	1980–90
Active leader
2	Connor McDavid	811	2015–present

*Included 61 WHA assists

Assists, same team
#	Player	A	Seasons
1	Wayne Gretzky	112 (LAK)	1979–88
2	Wayne Gretzky	103 (VAN)	1979–88
3	Wayne Gretzky	89 (CGY)	1979–88
4	Wayne Gretzky	87 (WIN)	1979–88
5	Jari Kurri	67 (LAK)	1980–90
Active leader
N/A	Connor McDavid	51 (VAN)	2014–present

Points
#	Player	Pts	Seasons
1	Wayne Gretzky	1,773*	1978–88
2	Connor McDavid	1,220	2015–present
3	Leon Draisaitl	1,053	2014–present
4	Jari Kurri	1,043	1980–90
5	Mark Messier	1,034	1979–91
Active leader
2	Connor McDavid	1,220	2015–present

*Included 104 WHA points

Points, same team
#	Player	Pts	Seasons
1	Wayne Gretzky	170 (LAK)	1979–88
2	Wayne Gretzky	153 (VAN)	1979–88
3	Wayne Gretzky	144 (WIN)	1979–88
4	Wayne Gretzky	133 (CGY)	1979–88
5	Jari Kurri	113 (LAK)	1980–90
Active leader
N/A	Connor McDavid	75 (VAN)	2015–present

Penalties in minutes
#	Player	PIM	Seasons
1	Kelly Buchberger	1,747	1986–99
2	Kevin McClelland	1,289	1983–90
3	Dave Semenko	1,279*	1977–87
4	Kevin Lowe	1,236	1979–92; 1996–98
5	Mark Messier	1,124	1979–91
Active leader
44	Leon Draisaitl	366	2014–present

*Included 298 WHA PIM

Penalties in minutes, same team
#	Player	PIM	Seasons
1	Kevin McClelland	313 (CGY)	1983–90
2	Kelly Buchberger	243 (CGY)	1986–99
3	Kevin Lowe	212 (LAK)	1979–92; 1996–98
4	Kevin Lowe	197 (CGY)	1979–92; 1996–98
5	Dave Semenko	195 (CGY)	1979–87
Active leader
N/A	Leon Draisaitl	36 (CGY)	2014–present

Even strength goals
#	Player	EV	Seasons
1	Wayne Gretzky	437*	1978–88
2	Jari Kurri	336	1980–90
3	Connor McDavid	300	2015–present
3	Glenn Anderson	278	1980–91; 1996
4	Mark Messier	267	1979–91
Active leader
3	Connor McDavid	300	2015–present

*Included 34 WHA EV goals

Even strength goals, same team
#	Player	EV	Seasons
1	Wayne Gretzky	43 (WIN)	1979–88
2	Jari Kurri	39 (VAN)	1980–90
3	Mark Messier	38 (VAN)	1979–91
4	Jari Kurri	36 (WIN)	1980–90
5	Wayne Gretzky	32 (LAK)	1979–88
5	Wayne Gretzky	32 (VAN)	1979–88
Active leader
N/A	Connor McDavid	18 (CGY)	2015–present

Power play goals
#	Player	PP	Seasons
1	Leon Draisaitl	178	2014–present
2	Wayne Gretzky	134*	1978–88
3	Glenn Anderson	126	1980–91; 1996
3	Ryan Smyth	126	1994–07; 2011–14
5	Jari Kurri	107	1980–90
Active leader
1	Leon Draisaitl	178	2014–present

*Included 9 WHA PP goals

Power play goals, same team
#	Player	PP	Seasons
1	Glenn Anderson	19 (CGY)	1980–91; 1996
2	Wayne Gretzky	17 (LAK)	1979–88
3	Glenn Anderson	16 (LAK)	1980–91; 1996
4	Leon Draisaitl	16 (NSH)	2014–present
4	Leon Draisaitl	16 (VAN)	2014–present
Active leader
4	Leon Draisaitl	16 (NSH)	2014–present
4	Leon Draisaitl	16 (VAN)	2014–present

Short-handed goals
#	Player	SH	Seasons
1	Wayne Gretzky	55	1979–88
2	Mark Messier	36	1979–91
3	Jari Kurri	31	1980–90
4	Craig MacTavish	29	1985–94
5	Esa Tikkanen	21	1985–93
Active leader
13	Leon Draisaitl	10	2014–present

Short-handed goals, same team
#	Player	SH	Seasons
1	Wayne Gretzky	9 (LAK)	1979–88
2	Wayne Gretzky	8 (CGY)	1979–88
3	Wayne Gretzky	7 (WIN)	1979–88
4	Mark Messier	7 (LAK)	1979–91
5	Jari Kurri	6 (VAN)	1980–90
Active leader
N/A	Ryan Nugent-Hopkins	2 (SJS)	2011–present
N/A	Ryan Nugent-Hopkins	2 (WSH)	2011–present
N/A	Connor McDavid	2 (CBJ)	2015–present

Game-winning goals
#	Player	GW	Seasons
1	Connor McDavid	76	2015–present
2	Leon Draisaitl	75	2014–present
3	Glenn Anderson	72	1980–91; 1996
4	Wayne Gretzky	68*	1978–88
5	Jari Kurri	60	1980–90
Active leader
1	Connor McDavid	76	2014–present

*Included 7 WHA GW goals

Game-winning goals, same team
#	Player	GW	Seasons
1	Jari Kurri	13 (VAN)	1980–90
2	Glenn Anderson	12 (LAK)	1980–91; 1996
3	Connor McDavid	10 (CGY)	2015–present
4	Glenn Anderson	8 (WIN)	1980–91; 1996
4	Leon Draisaitl	8 (ANA)	2014–present
Active leader
3	Connor McDavid	10 (CGY)	2015–present

Overtime goals
#	Player	OTG	Seasons
1	Leon Draisaitl	20*	2014–present
2	Connor McDavid	17*	2015–present
3	Jari Kurri	7	1980–90
3	Evan Bouchard	7*	2018–present
5	Darnell Nurse	6*	2014–26
Active leader
1	Leon Draisaitl	20*	2014–present

*3-on-3 overtime

Overtime goals, same team
#	Player	OTG	Seasons
1	Jari Kurri	2 (MNS)	1980–90
1	Jari Kurri	2 (WSH)	1980–90
3	Ryan Smyth	2 (ARI)^	1994–07; 2011–14
T-4	Leon Draisaitl	2 (ANA)*	2014–present
T-4	Leon Draisaitl	2 (BOS)*	2014–present
T-4	Leon Draisaitl	2 (NJD)*	2014–present
T-4	Leon Draisaitl	2 (NYI)*	2014–present
T-4	Leon Draisaitl	2 (NYR)*	2014–present
T-4	Leon Draisaitl	2 (SJS)*	2014–present
T-4	Connor McDavid	2 (ARI)*	2015–present
T-4	Connor McDavid	2 (NYI)*	2015–present
T-4	Connor McDavid	2 (STL)*	2015–present
T-4	Connor McDavid	2 (WSH)*	
T-4	Evan Bouchard	2 (MTL)*	2018–present
T-4	Zach Hyman	2 (SJS)*	2021–present
Active leader
T-4	Leon Draisaitl	2 (ANA)*	2014–present
T-4	Leon Draisaitl	2 (BOS)*	2014–present
T-4	Leon Draisaitl	2 (NJD)*	2014–present
T-4	Leon Draisaitl	2 (NYI)*	2014–present
T-4	Leon Draisaitl	2 (NYR)*	2014–present
T-4	Leon Draisaitl	2 (SJS)*	2014–present
T-4	Connor McDavid	2 (ARI)*	2015–present
T-4	Connor McDavid	2 (NYI)*	2015–present
T-4	Connor McDavid	2 (STL)*	2015–present
T-4	Connor McDavid	2 (WSH)*	
T-4	Evan Bouchard	2 (MTL)*	2018–present
T-4	Zach Hyman	2 (SJS)*	2021–present

^4-on-4 overtime
*3-on-3 overtime

Shots
#	Player	S	Seasons
1	Wayne Gretzky	3,045*	1978–88
2	Connor McDavid	2,713	2015–present
3	Ryan Smyth	2,558	1994–07; 2011–14
4	Glenn Anderson	2,522	1980–91; 1996
5	Ryan Nugent-Hopkins	2,255	2011–present
Active leader
2	Connor McDavid	2,713	2015–present

*Included 253 WHA shots

Shots, same team
#	Player	S	Seasons
1	Wayne Gretzky	270 (LAK)	1979–88
2	Glenn Anderson	266 (LAK)	1980–91; 1996
3	Glenn Anderson	239 (CGY)	1980–91; 1996
4	Glenn Anderson	236 (VAN)	1980–91; 1996
5	Mark Messier	234 (VAN)	1979–91
Active leader
N/A	Connor McDavid	161 (CGY)	2015–present

Highest shooting percentage (minimum 200 shots)
#	Player	S%	Seasons
1	Craig Simpson	25.3	1987–93
2	Jari Kurri	21.9	1980–90
3	Stan Weir	21.1*	1978–82
4	Wayne Gretzky	20.6*	1978–88
5	Jimmy Carson	19.9	1988–89
Active leader
8	Leon Draisaitl	18.6	2014–present

*Included WHA stats

Highest shooting percentage, same team (minimum 60 shots)
#	Player	S	Seasons
1	Craig Simpson	32.8 (WIN)	1987–93
2	Leon Draisaitl	32.6 (NSH)	2014–present
3	Jari Kurri	31.33 (QUE)	1980–90
4	Leon Draisaitl	31.25 (CHI)	2014–present
5	Craig Simpson	30.4 (LAK)	1987–93
Active leader
2	Leon Draisaitl	32.6 (NSH)	2014–present

Lowest shooting percentage (minimum 200 shots; Forwards only)
#	Player	S%	Seasons
1	Anton Lander	4.76	2011–17
2	Patrick O'Sullivan	5.20	2009–10
3	Connor Brown	7.36	2023–25
4	Jochen Hecht	7.58	2001–02
5	Adam Graves	7.62	1989–91
Active leader
T-6	Mattias Janmark	7.69	2022–present

Lowest shooting percentage, same team (minimum 60 shots; Forwards only)
#	Player	S	Seasons
1	Sam Gagner	2.47 (MIN)	2007–14; 2018–20; 2023–24
2	Ethan Moreau	3.16 (VAN)	1999–10
3	Aleš Hemský	3.28 (STL)	2002–14
4	Doug Weight	3.85 (ANA)	1993–01
5	Todd Marchant	4.08 (COL)	1994–03
Active leader
N/A	Ryan Nugent-Hopkins	7.53 (CHI)	2011–present

Most shootout goals
#	Player	SOG	Seasons
1	Ales Hemsky	20	2005–14
1	Jordan Eberle	20	2010–17
3	Sam Gagner	18	2007–14; 2019–20
4	Ryan Nugent-Hopkins	16	2011–present
4	Connor McDavid	16	2015–present
Active leader
4	Ryan Nugent-Hopkins	16	2011–present
4	Connor McDavid	16	2015–present

Most shootout attempts
#	Player	SOA	Seasons
1	Ales Hemsky	58	2005–14
2	Sam Gagner	57	2007–14; 2019–20; 2023–2024
3	Jordan Eberle	52	2010–17
4	Ryan Nugent-Hopkins	47	2011–present
5	Connor McDavid	37	2015–present
Active leader
4	Ryan Nugent-Hopkins	47	2011–present

Highest shootout shooting percentage (minimum 7 shootout attempts)
#	Player	SO%	Seasons
1	Shawn Horcoff	50.0	2005–13
2	Connor McDavid	43.2	2015–present
3	Fernando Pisani	42.9	2005–10
3	Teddy Purcell	42.9	2014–16
5	David Perron	40.0	2013–15
Active leader
2	Connor McDavid	43.2	2015–present

Lowest shootout shooting percentage (minimum 7 shootout attempts)
#	Player	SO%	Seasons
1	Dustin Penner	10.0	2007–11
2	Derek Roy	11.1	2014–15
3	Matt Hendricks	20.0	2014–17
4	Taylor Hall	26.7	2010–16
5	Jarret Stoll	28.6	2002–08
5	Linus Omark	28.6	2010–12; 2013–14
Active leader
10	Ryan Nugent-Hopkins	34.0	2011–present

Hat-tricks
#	Player	HT	Seasons
1	Wayne Gretzky	46*	1978–88
T-2	Glenn Anderson	20	1980–91; 1996
T-2	Jari Kurri	20	1980–90
4	Connor McDavid	15	2015–present
5	Mark Messier	13	1979–91
Active leader
4	Connor McDavid	15	2015–present

*Included 3 WHA hat-tricks

Hat-tricks, same team
#	Player	HT	Seasons
1	Wayne Gretzky	4 (WPG)	1978–88
T-2	Glenn Anderson	4 (LAK)	1980–91; 1996
T-2	Wayne Gretzky	4 (STL)	1978–88
T-2	Wayne Gretzky	4 (PIT)	1978–88
T-2	Wayne Gretzky	4 (PHI)	1978–88
Active leader
T-9	Connor McDavid	3 (CGY)	2015–present

=== Defencemen ===
Games played
#	Player	GP	Seasons
1	Kevin Lowe	1,037	1979–92; 1996–98
2	Darnell Nurse	798	2014–26
3	Charlie Huddy	694	1980–91
4	Lee Fogolin	586	1979–87
5	Steve Staios	573	2001–10
Active leader
12	Evan Bouchard	429	2018–present

Goals
#	Player	G	Seasons
1	Paul Coffey	209	1980–87
2	Darnell Nurse	88	2014–26
3	Charlie Huddy	81	1980–91
4	Ken Baird	77	1972–78
5	Evan Bouchard	76	2018–present
Active leader
5	Evan Bouchard	76	2018–present

Assists
#	Player	A	Seasons
1	Paul Coffey	460	1980–87
2	Kevin Lowe	309	1979–92; 1996–98
3	Charlie Huddy	287	1980–91
4	Al Hamilton	273*	1972–80
5	Evan Bouchard	257	2018–present
Active leader
5	Evan Bouchard	257	2018–present

*Included 258 WHA assists

Points
#	Player	Pts	Seasons
1	Paul Coffey	669	1980–87
2	Kevin Lowe	383	1979–92; 1996–98
3	Charlie Huddy	368	1980–91
4	Evan Bouchard	333	2018–present
5	Al Hamilton	330*	1972–80
Active leader
4	Evan Bouchard	333	2018–present

*Included 311 WHA points

Penalties in minutes
#	Player	PIM	Seasons
1	Kevin Lowe	1,236	1979–92; 1996–98
2	Steve Smith	1,080	1984–91
3	Lee Fogolin	886	1979–87
4	Marty McSorley	748	1985–88; 1998–99
5	Steve Staios	743	2001–10
Active leader
37	Evan Bouchard	154	2018–present

Even strength goals
#	Player	EV	Seasons
1	Paul Coffey	125	1980–87
2	Darnell Nurse	79	2014–26
3	Ken Baird	63	1972–78
4	Charlie Huddy	54	1980–91
5	Kevin Lowe	53	1979–92; 1996–98
Active leader
6	Evan Bouchard	52	2018–present

Power play goals
#	Player	PP	Seasons
1	Paul Coffey	69	1980–87
2	Charlie Huddy	25	1980–91
3	Boris Mironov	24	1994–99
3	Evan Bouchard	24	2018–present
4	Al Hamilton	22*	1972–80
Active leader
T-3	Evan Bouchard	24	2018–present

*Included 21 WHA PP goals

Short-handed goals
#	Player	SH	Seasons
1	Paul Coffey	15	1980–87
2	Darnell Nurse	6	2014–26
3	Kevin Lowe	5	1979–92; 1996–98
3	Lee Fogolin	5	1979–87
5	Bob Wall	3	1972–74
5	Doug Barrie	3	1972–77
5	Doug Hicks	3	1979–82
5	Randy Gregg	3	1982–90
5	Craig Muni	3	1986–93
5	Luke Richardson	3	1991–97
5	Jason Smith	3	1999–07
5	Steve Staios	3	2001–10
Active leader
T-11	Jake Walman	2	2024–present

Game-winning goals
#	Player	GW	Seasons
1	Paul Coffey	18	1980–87
2	Evan Bouchard	17	2018–present
3	Darnell Nurse	13	2014–26
4	Kevin Lowe	11	1979–92; 1996–98
5	Ken Baird	9	1972–78
Active leader
2	Evan Bouchard	17	2018–present

Overtime goals
#	Player	OTG	Seasons
1	Evan Bouchard	7*	2018–present
2	Darnell Nurse	6*	2014–26
3	Eric Brewer	3^	2000–04
4	Al Hamilton	2^^	1972–80
5	Steve Smith	2	1984–91
Active leader
1	Evan Bouchard	7*	2018–present

^4-on-4 overtime
^^Included WHA OT goals
*3-on-3 overtime

Shots
#	Player	S	Seasons
1	Darnell Nurse	1,860	2014–26
2	Paul Coffey	1,624	1980–87
3	Charlie Huddy	1,340	1980–91
4	Kevin Lowe	1,097	1979–92; 1996–98
5	Evan Bouchard	1,085	2018–present
Active leader
5	Evan Bouchard	1,085	2018–present

Highest shooting percentage (minimum 200 shots)
#	Player	S%	Seasons
1	Paul Coffey	12.9	1980–87
2	Marty McSorley	12.0	1985–88; 1998–99
3	Joe Micheletti	9.46*	1977–79
4	Marc-Andre Bergeron	9.04	2003–07
5	Randy Gregg	8.70	1982–90
Active leader
8	Evan Bouchard	7.00	2018–present

*Included WHA stats

Lowest shooting percentage (minimum 200 shots)
#	Player	S%	Seasons
1	Bryan Marchment	2.64	1994–97
2	Kris Russell	2.93	2016–22
3	Luke Richardson	3.00	1991–97
4	Ladislav Smid	3.69	2006–13
5	Brett Kulak	3.82	2022–2025
Active leader
25	Mattias Ekholm	6.16	2022–present

Hat-tricks
#	Player	HT	Seasons
1	Paul Coffey	4	1980–87
T-2	Evan Bouchard	1	2018–19; 2020–present
T-2	Mattias Ekholm	1	2023–present
T-2	Marc-Andre Bergeron	1	2003–07
T-2	Risto Siltanen	1	1979–82
Active leader
T-2	Evan Bouchard	1	2018–19; 2020–present
T-2	Mattias Ekholm	1	2023–present

=== Goaltenders ===
Games played
#	Player	GP	Seasons
1	Bill Ranford	449	1987–96; 1999–00
2	Grant Fuhr	423	1981–91
3	Tommy Salo	334	1998–04
4	Andy Moog	235	1980–87
5	Cam Talbot	227	2015–19
Active leader
34	Tristan Jarry	19	2025–present

Wins
#	Player	W	Seasons
1	Grant Fuhr	226	1981–91
2	Bill Ranford	167	1987–96; 1999–00
3	Tommy Salo	147	1998–04
4	Andy Moog	143	1980–87
5	Stuart Skinner	109*	2020–2025
Active leader
29	Tristan Jarry	9	2025–present

*Included 3 shootout wins

Losses
#	Player	L	Seasons
1	Bill Ranford	193	1987–96; 1999–00
2	Tommy Salo	128	1998–04
3	Grant Fuhr	117	1981–91
4	Cam Talbot	107^	2015–19
5	Dave Dryden	94*	1975–80
Active leader
T-34	Tristan Jarry	6	2025–present

*Included 87 WHA losses
^Included 12 overtime losses
**Included 3 overtime losses

Goals against
#	Player	GA	Seasons
1	Grant Fuhr	1,470	1981–91
2	Bill Ranford	1,463	1987–96; 1999–00
3	Tommy Salo	796	1998–04
4	Andy Moog	777	1980–87
5	Dave Dryden	685*	1975–80
Active leader
32	Tristan Jarry	62	2025–present

*Included 632 WHA goals against

Shots against
#	Player	SA	Seasons
1	Bill Ranford	12,965	1987–96; 1999–00
2	Grant Fuhr	12,524	1981–91
3	Tommy Salo	8,455	1998–04
4	Andy Moog	6,826	1980–87
5	Cam Talbot	6,689	2015–19
Active leader
33	Tristan Jarry	436	2025–present

Saves
#	Player	SV	Seasons
1	Bill Ranford	11,502	1987–96; 1999–00
2	Grant Fuhr	11,054	1981–91
3	Tommy Salo	7,659	1998–04
4	Cam Talbot	6,098	2015–19
5	Andy Moog	6,049	1980–87
Active leader
33	Tristan Jarry	374	2025–present

Highest save percentage (minimum 2,000 shots)
#	Player	SV%	Seasons
1	Mike Smith	.913	2019–22
2	Cam Talbot	.912	2015–19
3	Devan Dubnyk	.910	2009–14
4	Dwayne Roloson	.909	2005–09
5	Mikko Koskinen	.907	2018–22
Active leader
N/A	N/A	N/A	N/A

Lowest save percentage (minimum 2,000 shots)
#	Player	SV%	Seasons
1	Eddie Mio	.865	1978–81
2	Dave Dryden	.881	1975–80
3	Grant Fuhr	.883	1981–91
4	Andy Moog	.886	1980–87
5	Bill Ranford	.887	1987–96; 1999–00
Active leader
N/A	N/A	N/A	N/A–present

Lowest goals-against average (minimum 4,000 minutes)
#	Player	GAA	Seasons
1	Tommy Salo	2.44	1998–04
2	Mike Smith	2.70	2019–22
3	Jussi Markkanen	2.73	2001–07
4	Cam Talbot	2.740	2015–19
5	Stuart Skinner	2.741	2020–25
Active leader
N/A	N/A	N/A	N/A–present

Highest goals against average (minimum 4,000 minutes)
#	Player	GAA	Seasons
1	Eddie Mio	4.01	1978–81
2	Grant Fuhr	3.69	1981–91
3	Andy Moog	3.62	1980–87
4	Bill Ranford	3.51	1987–96; 1999–00
5	Dave Dryden	3.47	1975–80
Active leader
N/A	N/A	N/A	N/A–present

Shutouts
#	Player	SO	Seasons
1	Tommy Salo	23	1998–04
2	Curtis Joseph	14	1996–98
3	Cam Talbot	12	2015–19
4	Grant Fuhr	9	1981–91
4	Stuart Skinner	9	2020–25
Active leader
N/A	N/A	N/A	N/A–present

Minutes
#	Player	MIN	Seasons
1	Bill Ranford	25,005	1987–96; 1999–00
2	Grant Fuhr	23,892	1981–91
3	Tommy Salo	19,564	1998–04
4	Cam Talbot	12,941	2015–19
5	Andy Moog	12,880	1980–87
Active leader
N/A	N/A	N/A	N/A–present

Most shootouts
#	Player	SOGP	Seasons
1	Dwayne Roloson	26	2005–09
2	Devan Dubnyk	21	2009–14
3	Cam Talbot	19	2015–19
4	Nikolai Khabibulin	14	2009–13
5	Mathieu Garon	11	2007–09
Active leader
N/A	N/A	N/A	N/A–present

Most shootout wins
#	Player	SOW	Seasons
1	Dwayne Roloson	13	2005–09
2	Cam Talbot	12	2015–19
3	Mathieu Garon	11	2007–09
4	Devan Dubnyk	9	2009–14
5	Mikko Koskinen	6	2018–22
Active leader
N/A	N/A	N/A	N/A–present

Most shootout losses
#	Player	SOL	Seasons
1	Dwayne Roloson	13	2005–09
2	Devan Dubnyk	12	2009–14
3	Nikolai Khabibulin	10	2009–13
4	Cam Talbot	7	2015–19
5	Stuart Skinner	6	2020–25
Active leader
N/A	N/A	N/A	N/A

Most shootout shots against
#	Player	SOSA	Seasons
1	Dwayne Roloson	94	2005–09
2	Devan Dubnyk	71	2009–14
3	Cam Talbot	60	2015–19
4	Nikolai Khabibulin	52	2009–13
5	Ben Scrivens	42	2014–15
Active leader
N/A	N/A	N/A	N/A

Most shootout saves
#	Player	SOSV	Seasons
1	Dwayne Roloson	66	2005–09
2	Devan Dubnyk	44	2009–14
3	Cam Talbot	37	2015–19
4	Ben Scrivens	33	2014–15
5	Mathieu Garon	32	2007–09
5	Nikolai Khabibulin	32	2009–13
Active leader
N/A	N/A	N/A	N/A

Most shootout goals against
#	Player	SOGA	Seasons
1	Dwayne Roloson	28	2005–09
2	Devan Dubnyk	27	2009–14
3	Cam Talbot	23	2015–19
4	Nikolai Khabibulin	20	2009–13
5	Stuart Skinner	13	2020–25
Active leader
N/A	N/A	N/A	N/A

Highest shootout save percentage (minimum 24 shootout attempts)
#	Player	SOSV%	Seasons
1	Mathieu Garon	.914	2007–09
2	Mikko Koskinen	.811	2018–22
3	Ben Scrivens	.786	2014–15
4	Viktor Fasth	.774	2014–15
5	Mike Morrison	.750	2005–06
Active leader
N/A	N/A	N/A	N/A–present

Lowest shootout save percentage (minimum 24 shootout attempts)
#	Player	SOSV%	Seasons
1	Stuart Skinner	.552	2020–25
2	Nikolai Khabibulin	.615	2009–13
3	Cam Talbot	.617	2015–19
4	Devan Dubnyk	.620	2009–14
5	Dwayne Roloson	.702	2005–09
Active leader
N/A	N/A	N/A	N/A–present

=== Coaches ===
Games coached
#	Coach	GC	Seasons
1	Glen Sather	1,020*	1977–89; 1993–94
2	Craig MacTavish	656	2000–09
3	Ron Low	341	1995–99
4	Todd McLellan	266	2015–19
5	Kris Knoblauch	233	2023–26
Active leader
N/A	N/A	N/A	N/A–present

*Included 178 WHA games

Most wins
#	Coach	W	Seasons
1	Glen Sather	559*	1977–89; 1993–94
2	Craig MacTavish	301^	2000–09
3	Ron Low	139	1995–99
4	Kris Knoblauch	135**	2023–26
5	Todd McLellan	123***	2015–19
Active leader
N/A	N/A	N/A	N/A–present

*Included 95 WHA wins
^Included 31 shootout wins
**Included 2 shootout wins
***Included 13 shootout wins

Most losses
#	Coach	L	Seasons
1	Glen Sather	344*	1977–89; 1993–94
2	Craig MacTavish	288^	2000–09
3	Ron Low	162	1995–99
4	Todd McLellan	134**	2015–19
5	Ted Green	102	1991–94
Active leader
N/A	N/A	N/A	N/A–present

*Included 76 WHA losses
^Included 36 overtime losses
**Included 15 overtime losses

== Single season records ==
=== Team ===
Most wins
#	W	Season
1	57	1983–84
2	56	1985–86
3	50	1986–87
4	50	2022–23
5	49	1984–85

Fewest wins (minimum 78 game season)
#	W	Season
1	24	2014–15
2	25	1993–94
2	25	2010–11
4	26	1992–93
5	27	1975–76
5	27	2009–10

Most losses
#	L	Season
1	50	1992–93
2	49	1975–76
3	47	2009–10
4	45	1993–94
4	45	2010–11

Fewest losses (minimum 78 game season)
#	L	Season
1	17	1981–82
1	17	1985–86
3	18	1983–84
4	20	1984–85
5	21	1982–83

Most points
#	Pts	Season
1	119	1983–84
1	119	1985–86
3	111	1981–82
4	109	1984–85
4	109	2022–23

Fewest points (minimum 78 game season)
#	Pts	Season
1	59	1975–76
2	60	1992–93
3	62	2009–10
3	62	2010–11
3	62	2014–15

Most goals for
#	GF	Season
1	446	1983–84
2	426	1985–86
3	424	1982–83
4	417	1981–82
5	401	1984–85

Fewest goals for (minimum 78 game season)
#	GF	Season
1	193	2010–11
2	195	2006–07
3	198	2014–15
4	203	2013–14
4	203	2015–16

Most goals against
#	GA	Season
1	345	1975–76
2	337	1992–93
3	327	1980–81
4	322	1979–80
5	315	1982–83

Fewest goals against (minimum 78 game season)
#	GA	Season
1	182	2001–02
2	207	2016–17
3	208	2003–04
4	212	1999–00
5	222	2000–01

Most Power Play goals
#	PP	Season
1	89	2022–23
2	88	1987–88
2	88	2005–06
4	86	1981–82
4	86	1982–83

Fewest Power play goals (minimum 78 game season)
#	PP	Season
1	31	2017–18
2	39	1973–74
3	40	1974–75
4	41	2014–15
5	43	2015–16

Most Power Play Opportunities
#	PPO	Season
1	485	2005–06
2	483	1997–98
3	452	1995–96
4	438	1998–99
5	419	1988–89

Fewest Power Play Opportunities (minimum 78 game season)
#	PPO	Season
1	210	2017–18
2	215	2024–25
3	222	2018–19
3	222	2025–26
5	232	2014–15

Highest Power Play Percentage (minimum 250 PPO)
#	PP%	Season
1	32.36	2022–23
2	30.63	2025–26
3	29.25	1982–83
4	26.44	1985–86
5	26.34	2023–24

Lowest Power Play Percentage (minimum 250 PPO)
#	PP%	Season
1	13.02	2003–04
2	14.21	2006–07
3	14.38	1998–99
4	14.47	2010–11
5	14.51	2002–03

Most Power play goals against
#	PPA	Season
1	106	1992–93
2	93	1991–92
3	89	1982–83
4	86	1987–88
5	82	1989–90

Fewest Power play goals against (minimum 78 game season)
#	PPA	Season
1	43	2016–17
2	45	2024–25
3	49	2015–16
3	49	2025–26
5	50	2001–02
5	50	2013–14

Most Power Play Opportunities Against
#	PPOA	Season
1	478	2005–06
2	464	1992–93
3	452	1988–89
4	447	1987–88
5	423	1991–92

Fewest Power Play Opportunities Against (minimum 78 game season)
#	PPOA	Season
1	206	2024–25
2	219	2014–15
3	221	2025–26
4	223	2016–17
5	236	1974–75

Highest penalty kill Percentage (minimum 250 PPOA)
#	PK%	Season
1	85.68	2001–02
2	85.37	1999–00
3	84.70	2007–08
4	84.55	2006–07
5	84.10	2005–06

Lowest penalty kill Percentage (minimum 250 PPOA)
#	PK%	Season
1	74.80	2018–19
2	75.57	1980–81
3	76.51	1979–80
4	76.71	2014–15
5	76.95	2010–11

Most Short-handed goals
#	SH	Season
1	36	1983–84
2	28	1986–87
3	27	1985–86
3	27	1988–89
5	25	1984–85

Fewest Short-handed goals (minimum 78 game season)
#	SH	Season
1	1	1976–77
2	2	1993–94
3	3	2008–09
4	4	2013–14
4	4	2014–15
4	4	2016–17

Most Short-handed goals against
#	SHA	Season
1	17	1988–89
2	15	1985–86
2	15	1991–92
4	13	1996–97
4	13	2013–14

Fewest Short-handed goals against (minimum 78 game season)
#	SHA	Season
1	2	2010–11
2	4	1973–74
2	4	1974–75
2	4	1979–80
2	4	1990–91
2	4	1999–00
2	4	2000–01
2	4	2006–07
2	4	2024–25

=== Skaters ===
Goals
#	Player	G	Season
1	Wayne Gretzky	92	1981–82
2	Wayne Gretzky	87	1983–84
3	Wayne Gretzky	73	1984–85
4	Wayne Gretzky	71	1982–83
4	Jari Kurri	71	1984–85

Goals, Rookie
#	Player	G	Season
1	Wayne Gretzky	43	1978–79
2	Mike Rogers	35	1974–75
3	Jason Arnott	33	1993–94
4	Jari Kurri	32	1980–81
5	Glenn Anderson	30	1980–81

Assists
#	Player	A	Season
1	Wayne Gretzky	163	1985–86
2	Wayne Gretzky	135	1984–85
3	Wayne Gretzky	125	1982–83
4	Wayne Gretzky	121	1986–87
5	Wayne Gretzky	120	1981–82

Assists, Rookie
#	Player	A	Season
1	Wayne Gretzky	61	1978–79
2	Mike Rogers	48	1974–75
3	Jari Kurri	43	1980–81
4	Dave Lumley	38	1979–80
5	Ross Perkins	37	1972–73

Points
#	Player	Pts	Season
1	Wayne Gretzky	215	1985–86
2	Wayne Gretzky	212	1981–82
3	Wayne Gretzky	208	1984–85
4	Wayne Gretzky	205	1983–84
5	Wayne Gretzky	196	1982–83

Points, Rookie
#	Player	Pts	Season
1	Wayne Gretzky	104	1978–79
2	Mike Rogers	83	1974–75
3	Jari Kurri	75	1980–81
4	Jason Arnott	68	1993–94
5	Ross Perkins	58	1972–73
5	Dave Lumley	58	1979–80

Penalties in minutes
#	Player	PIM	Season
1	Steve Smith	286	1987–88
2	Kevin McClelland	281	1987–88
3	Frank Beaton	274	1976–77
4	Kevin McClelland	266	1985–86
5	Marty McSorley	265	1985–86

Penalties in minutes, Rookie
#	Player	PIM	Season
1	Kelly Buchberger	234	1988–89
2	Steve Smith	166	1985–86
3	Dave Semenko	140	1977–78
4	Dave Lumley	138	1979–80
5	Dave Hunter	134	1978–79

Even strength goals
#	Player	EV	Seasons
1	Wayne Gretzky	68	1981–82
2	Wayne Gretzky	55	1983–84
3	Wayne Gretzky	54	1984–85
3	Jari Kurri	54	1984–85
5	Wayne Gretzky	47	1982–83

Even strength goals, Rookie
#	Player	EV	Season
1	Wayne Gretzky	34	1978–79
2	Mike Rogers	31	1974–75
3	Ed Patenaude	25	1972–73
4	Ron Walters	24	1972–73
5	Jari Kurri	23	1980–81
5	Jason Arnott	23	1993–94

Power play goals
#	Player	PP	Seasons
1	Leon Draisaitl	32	2022–23
2	Leon Draisaitl	24	2021–22
3	Connor McDavid	21	2015–16
3	Leon Draisaitl	21	2023–24
5	Wayne Gretzky	20	1983–84
5	Ryan Smyth	20	1996–97

Power play goals, Rookie
#	Player	PP	Seasons
1	Glenn Anderson	10	1980–81
1	Jason Arnott	10	1993–94
1	David Oliver	10	1994–95
4	Wayne Gretzky	9	1978–79
4	Jari Kurri	9	1980–81

Short-handed goals
#	Player	SH	Seasons
1	Wayne Gretzky	12	1983–84
2	Wayne Gretzky	11	1984–85
3	Paul Coffey	9	1985–86
4	Esa Tikkanen	8	1988–89
5	Wayne Gretzky	7	1986–87

Short-handed goals, Rookie
#	Player	SH	Seasons
1	Ron Walters	3	1972–73
1	Mike Zuke	3	1977–78
1	Glenn Anderson	3	1980–81
1	Mats Lindgren	3	1996–97
5	Randy Gregg	2	1981–82
5	Todd Marchant	2	1994–95
5	Andrew Cogliano	2	2007–08
5	Jordan Eberle	2	2010–11
5	Matthew Savoie	2	2025–26

Game-winning goals
#	Player	GW	Seasons
1	Jari Kurri	13	1984–85
2	Wayne Gretzky	12	1981–82
3	Glenn Anderson	11	1983–84
3	Leon Draisaitl	11	2021–22
3	Leon Draisaitl	11	2025–26
3	Connor McDavid	11	2022–23

Game-winning goals, Rookie
#	Player	GW	Season
1	Ron Walters	8	1972–73
2	Wayne Gretzky	7	1978–79
3	Dave Lumley	6	1979–80
4	Glenn Anderson	5	1980–81
4	Andrew Cogliano	5	2007–08
4	Jordan Eberle	5	2010–11
4	Connor McDavid	5	2015–16
4	Matthew Savoie	5	2025–26

Shots
#	Player	S	Seasons
1	Wayne Gretzky	369	1981–82
2	Wayne Gretzky	358	1984–85
3	Connor McDavid	352	2022–23
4	Wayne Gretzky	350	1985–86
5	Wayne Gretzky	348	1982–83

Shots, Rookie
#	Player	S	Seasons
1	Wayne Gretzky	253	1978–79
2	Jari Kurri	202	1980–81
3	Jason Arnott	194	1993–94
4	Mike Rogers	189	1974–75
5	Mike Zuke	188	1977–78

Highest shooting percentage (minimum 100 shots)
#	Player	S%	Seasons
1	Craig Simpson	36.4	1987–88
2	Craig Simpson	28.9	1988–89
3	Jari Kurri	28.8	1985–86
4	Jari Kurri	27.2	1984–85
5	Esa Tikkanen	27.0	1986–87

Highest shooting percentage (minimum 100 shots), Rookie
#	Player	S	Seasons
1	Glenn Anderson	18.8	1980–81
2	Mike Rogers	18.5	1974–75
3	Jason Arnott	17.01	1993–94
4	Wayne Gretzky	17.00	1978–79
5	Miroslav Šatan	15.9	1995–96

Lowest shooting percentage (minimum 100 shots; Forwards only)
#	Player	S%	Seasons
1	Éric Bélanger	3.39	2011–12
2	Connor Brown	3.70	2023–24
3	Michael Cammalleri	3.85	2017–18
4	Jim Dowd	4.85	1999–2000
5	Jason Arnott	5.00	1997–98

Lowest shooting percentage (minimum 100 shots; Forwards only), Rookie
#	Player	S%	Seasons
1	Magnus Pääjärvi	8.33	2010–11
2	Jarret Stoll	9.35	2003–04
3	Sam Gagner	9.63	2007–08
4	Bob Russell	11.0	1975–76
5	Kyle Brodziak	11.2	2007–08

Most shootout goals
#	Player	SOG	Seasons
1	Ales Hemsky	6	2007–08
1	Ales Hemsky	6	2011–12
3	Ales Hemsky	5	2005–06
3	Sam Gagner	5	2007–08
3	Shawn Horcoff	5	2007–08
3	Jordan Eberle	5	2013–14

Most shootout attempts
#	Player	SOA	Seasons
1	Sam Gagner	17	2007–08
2	Ales Hemsky	16	2007–08
3	Ales Hemsky	14	2005–06
4	Ryan Smyth	13	2005–06
5	Jordan Eberle	12	2011–12
5	Jordan Eberle	12	2014–15

Highest shootout shooting percentage (minimum 7 shootout attempts)
#	Player	SO%	Seasons
1	Shawn Horcoff	71.4	2007–08
1	Jordan Eberle	71.4	2013–14
3	Sam Gagner	66.7	2011–12
4	Robert Nilsson	57.1	2007–08
4	Shawn Horcoff	57.1	2009–10

Lowest shootout shooting percentage (minimum 7 shootout attempts)
#	Player	SO%	Seasons
1	Sam Gagner	0.0	2009–10
2	Derek Roy	11.1	2014–15
3	Jordan Eberle	16.7	2014–15
4	Jordan Eberle	25.0	2011–12
5	Taylor Hall	28.6	2010–11

Hat-tricks
#	Player	HT	Seasons
T-1	Wayne Gretzky	10	1981–82
T-1	Wayne Gretzky	10	1983–84
3	Wayne Gretzky	6	1984–85
4	Jari Kurri	5	1984–85
5	Zach Hyman	4	2023–24

Hat-tricks, rookie
#	Player	HT	Seasons
1	Jari Kurri	3	1980–81
2	Glenn Anderson	2	1980–81
T-3	Taylor Hall	1	2010–11
T-3	Ryan Nugent-Hopkins	1	2011–12
T-3	Matthew Savoie	1	2025–26

=== Defencemen ===
Goals
#	Player	G	Season
1	Paul Coffey	48	1985–86
2	Paul Coffey	40	1983–84
3	Paul Coffey	37	1984–85
4	Ken Baird	30	1974–75
5	Paul Coffey	29	1981–82
5	Paul Coffey	29	1982–83

Goals, Rookie
#	Player	G	Season
1	Ken Baird	14	1972–73
1	Joe Micheletti	14	1977–78
3	Tom Gilbert	13	2007–08
4	Paul Coffey	9	1980–81
4	Marc-Andre Bergeron	9	2003–04

Assists
#	Player	A	Season
1	Paul Coffey	90	1985–86
2	Paul Coffey	86	1983–84
3	Paul Coffey	84	1984–85
4	Evan Bouchard	74	2025–26
5	Paul Coffey	67	1982–83

Assists, Rookie
#	Player	A	Season
1	Joe Micheletti	34	1977–78
2	Risto Siltanen	29	1979–80
3	Paul Coffey	23	1980–81
4	Randy Gregg	22	1981–82
5	Steve Smith	20	1985–86
5	Tom Gilbert	20	2007–08

Points
#	Player	Pts	Season
1	Paul Coffey	138	1985–86
2	Paul Coffey	126	1983–84
3	Paul Coffey	121	1984–85
4	Paul Coffey	96	1982–83
5	Evan Bouchard	95	2025–26

Points, Rookie
#	Player	Pts	Season
1	Joe Micheletti	48	1977–78
2	Risto Siltanen	35	1979–80
3	Tom Gilbert	33	2007–08
4	Paul Coffey	32	1980–81
5	Ken Baird	29	1972–73

Penalties in minutes
#	Player	PIM	Season
1	Steve Smith	286	1987–88
2	Marty McSorley	265	1985–86
3	Marty McSorley	223	1987–88
4	Dave Manson	220	1991–92
5	Doug Barrie	214	1973–74

Penalties in minutes, Rookie
#	Player	PIM	Season
1	Sean Brown	188	1998–99
2	Steve Smith	166	1985–86
3	Paul Coffey	130	1980–81
4	Jeff Beukeboom	124	1986–87
5	Ken Baird	112	1972–73

Even strength goals
#	Player	EV	Seasons
1	Paul Coffey	30	1985–86
2	Paul Coffey	25	1983–84
3	Paul Coffey	23	1984–85
4	Ken Baird	22	1974–75
5	Paul Coffey	19	1982–83

Even strength goals, Rookie
#	Player	EV	Season
1	Ken Baird	13	1972–73
2	Joe Micheletti	11	1977–78
3	Tom Gilbert	10	2007–08
4	Steve Carlyle	7	1972–73
4	Paul Coffey	7	1980–81

Power play goals
#	Player	PP	Season
1	Paul Coffey	14	1983–84
2	Paul Coffey	13	1981–82
3	Paul Coffey	12	1984–85
3	Sheldon Souray	12	2008–09
5	Paul Coffey	10	1986–87
5	Boris Mironov	10	1997–98
5	Chris Pronger	10	2005–06

Power play goals, Rookie
#	Player	PP	Season
1	Justin Schultz	4	2012–13
2	Joe Micheletti	3	1977–78
2	Marc-Andre Bergeron	3	2003–04
2	Tom Gilbert	3	2007–08

Short-handed goals
#	Player	SH	Seasons
1	Paul Coffey	9	1985–86
2	Lee Fogolin	4	1980–81
3	Steve Staios	3	2002–03

Short-handed goals, Rookie
#	Player	SH	Seasons
1	Randy Gregg	2	1981–82
2	Brad Werenka	1	1992–93
2	Dan McGillis	1	1996–97

Game-winning goals
#	Player	GW	Seasons
1	Evan Bouchard	7	2023–24
2	Paul Coffey	6	1984–85
3	Sheldon Souray	5	2008–09
3	Evan Bouchard	5	2025–26
5	Ken Baird	4	1974–75
5	Paul Coffey	4	1983–84
5	Boris Mironov	4	1998–99
5	Darnell Nurse	4	2022–23

Game-winning goals, Rookie
#	Player	GW	Seasons
1	Tom Poti	3	1998–99
1	Justin Schultz	3	2012–13
3	Ken Baird	2	1972–73
3	Joe Micheletti	2	1977–78
3	Randy Gregg	2	1981–82
3	Dan McGillis	2	1996–97

Shots
#	Player	S	Seasons
1	Paul Coffey	307	1985–86
2	Paul Coffey	284	1984–85
3	Sheldon Souray	268	2008–09
4	Paul Coffey	259	1982–83
5	Paul Coffey	258	1983–84

Shots, Rookie
#	Player	S	Seasons
1	Joe Micheletti	141	1977–78
2	Dan McGillis	139	1996–97
3	Dave Langevin	133	1976–77
4	Darnell Nurse	120	2015–16
5	Risto Siltanen	116	1979–80

Highest shooting percentage (minimum 100 shots)
#	Player	S%	Seasons
1	Ken Baird	17.3	1974–75
2	Paul Coffey	15.6	1985–86
3	Paul Coffey	15.5	1983–84
4	Charlie Huddy	13.2	1982–83
5	Paul Coffey	13.0	1984–85

Highest shooting percentage (minimum 100 shots), Rookie
#	Player	S	Seasons
1	Joe Micheletti	9.93	1977–78
2	Marc-Andre Bergeron	8.57	2003–04
3	Paul Coffey	7.96	1980–81
4	Dave Langevin	5.26	1976–77
5	Risto Siltanen	5.17	1979–80

Lowest shooting percentage (minimum 100 shots)
#	Player	S%	Seasons
1	Charlie Huddy	0.84	1989–90
2	Tom Poti	1.00	2001–02
3	Steve Carlyle	1.69	1974–75
4	Jeff Petry	1.80	2011–12
5	Dave Manson	2.08	1993–94

Lowest shooting percentage (minimum 100 shots), Rookie
#	Player	S%	Seasons
1	Darnell Nurse	2.50	2015–16
2	Dan McGillis	4.32	1996–97

=== Goaltenders ===
Games played
#	Player	GP	Season
1	Grant Fuhr	75	1987–88
2	Tommy Salo	73	2000–01
2	Cam Talbot	73	2016–17
4	Curtis Joseph	72	1996–97
5	Bill Ranford	71	1993–94
5	Curtis Joseph	71	1997–98

Games played, Rookie
#	Player	GP	Season
1	Stuart Skinner	50	2022–23
2	Grant Fuhr	48	1981–82
2	Jeff Deslauriers	48	2009–10
4	Devan Dubnyk	35	2010–11
5	Ken Brown	32	1974–75

Wins
#	Player	W	Season
1	Cam Talbot	42*	2016–17
2	Grant Fuhr	40	1987–88
3	Tommy Salo	36	2000–01
3	Stuart Skinner	36^	2023–24
5	Andy Moog	33	1982–83

*Included 4 shootout wins
^Included 2 shootout wins

Wins, Rookie
#	Player	W	Season
1	Stuart Skinner	29	2022–23
2	Grant Fuhr	28	1981–82
3	Jeff Deslauriers	12*	2009–10
3	Devan Dubnyk	12	2010–11
5	Ken Brown	11	1974–75
5	Ken Brown	10	1972–73
5	Anders Nilsson	10^	2015–16

*Included 4 shootout wins
^Included 2 shootout wins

Losses
#	Player	L	Season
1	Bill Ranford	38	1992–93
1	Dwayne Roloson	38*	2006–07
3	Bill Ranford	34	1993–94
3	Cam Talbot	34^	2017–18
5	Nikolai Khabibulin	33**	2010–11

*Included 4 overtime losses
^Included 3 overtime losses
**Included 1 overtime loss

Losses, Rookie
#	Player	L	Season
1	Jeff Deslauriers	29*	2009–10
2	Devan Dubnyk	15^	2010–11
3	Anders Nilsson	14^	2015–16
4	Stuart Skinner	14	2022–23
5	Ken Brown	11	1974–75
5	Devan Dubnyk	11*	2009–10

*Included 1 overtime loss
^Included 2 overtime losses

Goals against
#	Player	GA	Season
1	Grant Fuhr	246	1987–88
2	Bill Ranford	240	1992–93
3	Bill Ranford	236	1993–94
4	Bill Ranford	228	1991–92
5	Grant Fuhr	213	1988–89

Goals against, Rookie
#	Player	GA	Season
1	Grant Fuhr	157	1981–82
2	Jeff Deslauriers	152	2009–10
3	Stuart Skinner	133	2022–23
4	Devan Dubnyk	93	2010–11
5	Ken Brown	86	1974–75

Shots against
#	Player	SA	Season
1	Bill Ranford	2,325	1993–94
2	Curtis Joseph	2,144	1996–97
3	Cam Talbot	2,117	2016–17
4	Grant Fuhr	2,066	1987–88
5	Bill Ranford	2,065	1992–93

Shots against, Rookie
#	Player	SA	Season
1	Grant Fuhr	1,546	1981–82
2	Stuart Skinner	1,536	2022–23
3	Jeff Deslauriers	1,529	2009–10
4	Devan Dubnyk	1,103	2010–11
5	Ken Brown	845	1974–75

Saves
#	Player	SV	Season
1	Bill Ranford	2,089	1993–94
2	Cam Talbot	1,946	2016–17
3	Curtis Joseph	1,944	1996–97
4	Cam Talbot	1,848	2017–18
5	Bill Ranford	1,825	1992–93

Saves, Rookie
#	Player	SV	Season
1	Stuart Skinner	1,404	2022–23
2	Grant Fuhr	1,389	1981–82
3	Jeff Deslauriers	1,377	2009–10
4	Devan Dubnyk	1,010	2010–11
5	Ken Brown	759	1974–75

Highest save percentage (minimum 1,000 shots)
#	Player	SV%	Season
1	Devan Dubnyk	.921	2012–13
2	Cam Talbot	.919	2016–17
3	Cam Talbot	.917	2015–16
4	Devan Dubnyk	.916	2010–11
5	Dwayne Roloson	.915	2008–09

Highest save percentage (minimum 1,000 shots), Rookie
#	Player	SV%	Season
1	Devan Dubnyk	.916	2010–11
2	Stuart Skinner	.914	2022–23
3	Jeff Deslauriers	.901	2009–10
4	Grant Fuhr	.898	1981–82

Lowest save percentage (minimum 1,000 shots)
#	Player	SV%	Season
1	Eddie Mio	.867	1980–81
2	Bill Ranford	.875	1995–96
3	Grant Fuhr	.876	1988–89
4	Grant Fuhr	.8808	1986–87
5	Grant Fuhr	.8809	1987–88

Lowest goals against average (minimum 2,000 minutes)
#	Player	GAA	Season
1	Tommy Salo	2.22	2001–02
2	Tommy Salo	2.33	1999–2000
3	Cam Talbot	2.39	2016–17
4	Ty Conklin	2.42	2003–04
5	Tommy Salo	2.46	2000–01

Lowest goals against average (minimum 2,000 minutes), Rookie
#	Player	SV%	Season
1	Devan Dubnyk	2.71	2010–11
2	Stuart Skinner	2.75	2022–23
3	Jeff Deslauriers	3.26	2009–10
4	Grant Fuhr	3.31	1981–82

Highest goals against average (minimum 2,000 minutes)
#	Player	GAA	Season
1	Grant Fuhr	3.93	1985–86
2	Grant Fuhr	3.91	1983–84
3	Eddie Mio	3.89	1980–81
4	Grant Fuhr	3.87	1984–85
5	Bill Ranford	3.84	1992–93

Shutouts
#	Player	SO	Season
1	Curtis Joseph	8	1997–98
1	Tommy Salo	8	2000–01
3	Cam Talbot	7	2016–17
4	Curtis Joseph	6	1996–97
4	Tommy Salo	6	2001–02

Shutouts, Rookie
#	Player	SO	Season
1	Jeff Deslauriers	3	2009–10
2	Ken Brown	2	1974–75
2	Devan Dubnyk	2	2010–11
4	Ken Brown	1	1972–73
4	Stuart Skinner	1	2021–22
4	Stuart Skinner	1	2022–23

Minutes
#	Player	MIN	Season
1	Tommy Salo	4,364	2000–01
2	Grant Fuhr	4,304	1987–88
3	Cam Talbot	4,294	2016–17
4	Tommy Salo	4,164	1999–2000
5	Curtis Joseph	4,132	1997–98

Minutes, Rookie
#	Player	MIN	Season
1	Stuart Skinner	2,903	2022–23
2	Grant Fuhr	2,847	1981–82
3	Jeff Deslauriers	2,798	2009–10
4	Devan Dubnyk	2,061	2010–11
5	Ken Brown	1,466	1974–75

Most shootouts
#	Player	SOGP	Seasons
1	Mathieu Garon	10	2007–08
2	Dwayne Roloson	9	2007–08
2	Cam Talbot	9	2016–17
4	Dwayne Roloson	8	2008–09
5	Michael Morrison	7	2005–06
5	Jeff Deslauriers	7	2009–10
5	Devan Dubnyk	7	2011–12
5	Ben Scrivens	7	2014–15

Most shootout wins
#	Player	SOW	Seasons
1	Mathieu Garon	10	2007–08
2	Dwayne Roloson	5	2007–08
3	Dwayne Roloson	4	2008–09
3	Michael Morrison	4	2005–06
3	Devan Dubnyk	4	2011–12
3	Cam Talbot	4	2016–17
3	Cam Talbot	4	2017–18

Most shootout losses
#	Player	SOL	Seasons
1	Devan Dubnyk	6	2010–11
2	Nikolai Khabibulin	5	2011–12
2	Ben Scrivens	5	2014–15
2	Cam Talbot	5	2016–17
5	Dwayne Roloson	4	2007–08
5	Dwayne Roloson	4	2008–09

Most shootout shots against
#	Player	SOSA	Seasons
1	Ben Scrivens	38	2014–15
2	Dwayne Roloson	37	2007–08
2	Jeff Deslauriers	37	2009–10
4	Mathieu Garon	32	2007–08
5	Devan Dubnyk	27	2011–12
5	Cam Talbot	27	2016–17

Most shootout saves
#	Player	SOSV	Seasons
1	Mathieu Garon	30	2007–08
2	Ben Scrivens	29	2014–15
3	Dwayne Roloson	27	2007–08
4	Jeff Deslauriers	26	2009–10
5	Devan Dubnyk	20	2011–12
5	Viktor Fasth	20	2014–15

Most shootout goals against
#	Player	SOGA	Seasons
1	Nikolai Khabibulin	12	2011–12
2	Jeff Deslauriers	11	2009–10
2	Cam Talbot	11	2016–17
4	Dwayne Roloson	10	2007–08
5	Devan Dubnyk	10	2010–11

Highest shootout save percentage (minimum 24 shootout attempts)
#	Player	SOSV%	Seasons
1	Mathieu Garon	.938	2007–08
2	Viktor Fasth	.833	2014–15
3	Dwayne Roloson	.792	2008–09
4	Ben Scrivens	.763	2014–15
5	Mike Morrison	.750	2005–06

Lowest shootout save percentage (minimum 24 shootout attempts)
#	Player	SOSV%	Seasons
1	Cam Talbot	.593	2016–17
2	Dwayne Roloson	.703	2007–08
3	Jeff Deslauriers	.730	2009–10
4	Devan Dubnyk	.741	2011–12

== All-time post-season leaders ==
=== Skaters ===
Games played
#	Player	GP	Seasons
1	Kevin Lowe	172	1979–92; 1996–98
2	Mark Messier	166	1979–91
3	Glenn Anderson	164	1980–91
4	Jari Kurri	146	1980–90
5	Charlie Huddy	138	1981–91
Active leader
T-11	Leon Draisaitl	102	2016–present
T-11	Connor McDavid	102	2016–present
T-11	Ryan Nugent-Hopkins	102	2016–present

Goals
#	Player	G	Seasons
1	Jari Kurri	92	1980–90
2	Wayne Gretzky	91*	1978–88
3	Glenn Anderson	81	1980–91
4	Mark Messier	80	1979–91
5	Leon Draisaitl	55	2016–present
Active leader
5	Leon Draisaitl	55	2016–present

*Included 10 WHA goals

Assists
#	Player	A	Seasons
1	Wayne Gretzky	181*	1978–88
2	Mark Messier	135	1979–91
3	Connor McDavid	111	2016–present
4	Jari Kurri	110	1980–90
5	Glenn Anderson	102	1980–91
Active leader
3	Connor McDavid	111	2016–present

*Included 10 WHA assists

Points
#	Player	Pts	Seasons
1	Wayne Gretzky	272*	1978–88
2	Mark Messier	215	1979–91
3	Jari Kurri	202	1980–90
4	Glenn Anderson	183	1980–91
5	Connor McDavid	156	2016–present
Active leader
5	Connor McDavid	156	2016–present

*Included 20 WHA points

Penalties in minutes
#	Player	PIM	Seasons
1	Glenn Anderson	314	1980–91
2	Kevin McClelland	276	1983–89
3	Dave Hunter	251*	1978–87; 1988–89
4	Dave Semenko	230^	1977–86
5	Steve Smith	216	1985–91
Active leader
T-26	Leon Draisaitl	59	2016–present

*Included 42 WHA PIM
^Included 37 WHA PIM

Even strength goals
#	Player	EV	Seasons
1	Jari Kurri	63	1980–90
2	Glenn Anderson	59	1980–91
3	Mark Messier	53	1979–91
4	Wayne Gretzky	48	1979–88
5	Esa Tikkanen	37	1984–92
Active leader
6	Leon Draisaitl	31	2016–present

Power play goals
#	Player	PP	Seasons
1	Wayne Gretzky	23	1979–88
1	Leon Draisaitl	23	2016–present
3	Jari Kurri	22	1980–90
3	Glenn Anderson	22	1980–91
5	Mark Messier	16	1979–91
Active leader
1	Leon Draisaitl	23	2016–present

Short-handed goals
#	Player	SH	Seasons
1	Mark Messier	11	1979–91
2	Wayne Gretzky	10	1979–88
3	Jari Kurri	7	1980–90
4	Paul Coffey	3	1980–87
4	Todd Marchant	3	1996–01; 2002–03
Active leader
T-6	Connor McDavid	2	2016–present
T-6	Mattias Janmark	2	2022–present

Game-winning goals
#	Player	GW	Seasons
1	Wayne Gretzky	17*	1978–88
2	Jari Kurri	13	1980–90
3	Glenn Anderson	12	1980–91
4	Leon Draisaitl	8	2016–present
5	Mark Messier	7	1979–91
5	Craig Simpson	7	1987–92
5	Zach Hyman	7	2021–present
Active leader
4	Leon Draisaitl	8	2016–present

*Included 1 WHA GW

Shots
#	Player	S	Seasons
1	Wayne Gretzky	462	1979–88
2	Mark Messier	459	1979–91
3	Glenn Anderson	454	1980–91
4	Jari Kurri	416	1980–90
5	Connor McDavid	350	2016–present
Active leader
5	Connor McDavid	350	2016–present

Highest shooting percentage (minimum 50 shots)
#	Player	S%	Seasons
1	Craig Simpson	33.6	1987–92
2	Fernando Pisani	26.3	2002–03; 2005–06
3	Jari Kurri	22.1	1980–90
4	Ken Linseman	21.1	1982–84; 1990–91
5	Shawn Horcoff	20.0	2000–01; 2002–03; 2005–06
Active leader
8	Leon Draisaitl	19.0	2016–present

Lowest shooting percentage (minimum 50 shots; Forwards only)
#	Player	S%	Seasons
1	Ethan Moreau	3.03	1998–01; 2002–03; 2005–06
2	Warren Foegele	6.49	2021–24
3	Pat Hughes	7.22	1980–85
4	Adam Graves	7.45	1989–91
5	Rem Murray	7.58	1996–01; 2005–06
Active leader
15	Ryan Nugent-Hopkins	11.4	2016–present

Hat-tricks
#	Player	HT	Seasons
1	Wayne Gretzky	8*	1978–88
2	Jari Kurri	7	1980–90
T-3	Esa Tikkanen	3	1984–92
T-3	Mark Messier	3	1979–91
5	Evander Kane	2	2022–25
Active leader
T-5	Leon Draisaitl	2	2016–present

*Included 1 WHA HT

=== Defencemen ===
Games played
#	Player	GP	Seasons
1	Kevin Lowe	172	1979–92; 1996–98
2	Charlie Huddy	138	1981–91
3	Randy Gregg	130	1981–90
4	Darnell Nurse	100	2016–17; 2019–26
5	Paul Coffey	94	1980–87
Active leader
8	Evan Bouchard	81	2021–present

Goals
#	Player	G	Seasons
1	Paul Coffey	36	1980–87
2	Evan Bouchard	21	2021–present
3	Charlie Huddy	16	1981–91
4	Randy Gregg	13	1981–90
5	Steve Smith	10	1984–91
Active leader
2	Evan Bouchard	21	2021–present

Assists
#	Player	A	Seasons
1	Paul Coffey	67	1980–87
1	Evan Bouchard	67	2021–present
3	Charlie Huddy	61	1981–91
4	Kevin Lowe	43	1979–92; 1996–98
5	Randy Gregg	39	1981–90
Active leader
T-1	Evan Bouchard	67	2021–present

Points
#	Player	Pts	Seasons
1	Paul Coffey	103	1980–87
2	Evan Bouchard	88	2021–present
3	Charlie Huddy	77	1981–91
4	Randy Gregg	52	1981–90
4	Kevin Lowe	52	1979–92; 1996–98
Active leader
2	Evan Bouchard	88	2021–present

Penalties in minutes
#	Player	PIM	Seasons
1	Steve Smith	216	1985–91
2	Marty McSorley	184	1985–88; 1998–99
3	Paul Coffey	167	1980–87
4	Kevin Lowe	156	1979–92; 1996–98
5	Don Jackson	152	1982–86
Active leader
17	Evan Bouchard	38	2021–present

Even strength goals
#	Player	EV	Seasons
1	Paul Coffey	22	1980–87
2	Evan Bouchard	12	2021–present
3	Charlie Huddy	10	1981–91
3	Randy Gregg	10	1982–90
5	Steve Smith	7	1985–91
5	Kevin Lowe	7	1979–92; 1996–98
Active leader
2	Evan Bouchard	12	2021–present

Power play goals
#	Player	PP	Seasons
1	Paul Coffey	11	1980–87
2	Evan Bouchard	9	2021–present
3	Charlie Huddy	5	1981–91
4	Risto Siltanen	3	1979–82
4	Boris Mironov	3	1996–98
4	Chris Pronger	3	2005–06
Active leader
2	Evan Bouchard	9	2021–present

Short-handed goals
#	Player	SH	Seasons
1	Paul Coffey	3	1980–87
2	Kevin Lowe	2	1979–92; 1996–98
Active leader
N/A	N/A	N/A	N/A–present

Game-winning goals
#	Player	GW	Seasons
1	Paul Coffey	6	1980–87
1	Evan Bouchard	6	2021–present
3	Randy Gregg	4	1982–90
4	Steve Smith	2	1985–91
Active leader
T-1	Evan Bouchard	6	2021–present

Shots
#	Player	S	Seasons
1	Charlie Huddy	299	1981–91
2	Paul Coffey	288	1980–87
3	Evan Bouchard	220	2021–present
4	Darnell Nurse	187	2016–present
5	Kevin Lowe	157	1979–92; 1996–98
Active leader
3	Evan Bouchard	220	2021–present

Highest shooting percentage (minimum 50 shots)
#	Player	S%	Seasons
1	Paul Coffey	12.5	1980–87
2	Evan Bouchard	9.55	2021–present
3	Boris Mironov	8.77	1996–98
4	Randy Gregg	8.55	1982–90
5	Steve Smith	8.40	1985–91
Active leader
2	Evan Bouchard	9.55	2021–present

Lowest shooting percentage (minimum 50 shots)
#	Player	S%	Seasons
1	Craig Muni	0.00	1986–92
2	Brett Kulak	3.61	2021–25
3	Darnell Nurse	3.74	2016–17; 2019–26
4	Reijo Ruotsalainen	3.96	1986–87; 1989–90
5	Cody Ceci	4.92	2021–24
Active leader
10	Mattias Ekholm	8.33	2022–present

=== Goaltenders ===
Games played
#	Player	GP	Seasons
1	Grant Fuhr	111	1981–89; 1990–91
2	Stuart Skinner	50	2022–25
3	Bill Ranford	41	1989–92
4	Andy Moog	37	1980–81; 1982–87
5	Curtis Joseph	24	1996–98
Active leader
T-17	Tristan Jarry	1	2025–present

Losses
#	Player	L	Seasons
1	Grant Fuhr	32	1981–89; 1990–91
2	Stuart Skinner	22	2022–25
3	Bill Ranford	16	1989–92
3	Tommy Salo	16	1998–01; 2002–03
5	Curtis Joseph	14	1996–98
Active leader
T-15	Tristan Jarry	1	2025–present

Wins
#	Player	W	Seasons
1	Grant Fuhr	74	1981–89; 1990–91
2	Stuart Skinner	26	2022–25
3	Bill Ranford	25	1987–92
4	Andy Moog	23	1980–81; 1982–87
5	Dwayne Roloson	12	2005–06
Active leader
T-15	Tristan Jarry	0	2025–present

Shutouts
#	Player	SO	Seasons
1	Curtis Joseph	5	1996–98
2	Stuart Skinner	4	2022–25
3	Bill Ranford	3	1987–92
4	Grant Fuhr	2	1981–89; 1990–91
4	Cam Talbot	2	2016–17
4	Mike Smith	2	2019–2022
Active leader
T-9	Tristan Jarry	0	2025–present

=== Coaches ===
Games coached
#	Coach	GC	Seasons
1	Glen Sather	126	1979–89
2	Kris Knoblauch	53	2023–26
3	John Muckler	40	1989–91
4	Craig MacTavish	36	2000–01; 2002–03; 2005–06
5	Ron Low	28	1996–99
5	Jay Woodcroft	28	2021–23
Active leader
N/A	N/A	N/A	N/A–present

Games won
#	Coach	GW	Seasons
1	Glen Sather	89	1979–89
2	Kris Knoblauch	31	2023–26
3	John Muckler	25	1989–91
4	Craig MacTavish	19	2000–01; 2002–03; 2005–06
5	Jay Woodcroft	14	2021–23
Active leader
N/A	N/A	N/A	N/A–present

== Single season playoff records ==
=== Team ===
Games played
#	GP	Season
1	25	2024
2	24	2006
3	22	1990
3	22	2025
5	21	1987

Wins
#	W	Season
1	16	1987
1	16	1988
1	16	1990
4	15	1984
4	15	1985
4	15	2006
4	15	2024

Losses
#	L	Season
1	10	2024
2	9	1991
2	9	2006
4	8	1992
4	8	2022
4	8	2025

Most goals for
#	GF	Season
1	98	1985
2	94	1984
3	93	1990
4	87	1987
4	87	1988

Most goals against
#	GA	Season
1	73	2025
2	65	2024
3	61	2006
4	60	1990
4	60	1991

=== Skaters ===
Goals
#	Player	G	Season
1	Jari Kurri	19	1985
2	Wayne Gretzky	17	1985
3	Craig Simpson	16	1990
3	Zach Hyman	16	2024
5	Mark Messier	15	1983
5	Jari Kurri	15	1987

Assists
#	Player	A	Season
1	Connor McDavid	34	2024
2	Wayne Gretzky	31	1988
3	Wayne Gretzky	30	1985
4	Wayne Gretzky	29	1987
5	Wayne Gretzky	26	1983
5	Evan Bouchard	26	2024
5	Connor McDavid	26	2025

Points
#	Player	Pts	Season
1	Wayne Gretzky	47	1985
2	Wayne Gretzky	43	1988
3	Connor McDavid	42	2024
4	Wayne Gretzky	38	1983
5	Paul Coffey	37	1985

Penalties in minutes
#	Player	PIM	Season
1	Kevin McClelland	75	1985
2	Esa Tikkanen	72	1988
3	Dave Semenko	69	1983
4	Kevin McClelland	68	1988
5	Marty McSorley	67	1988

=== Defensemen ===
Goals
#	Player	G	Season
1	Paul Coffey	12	1985
2	Paul Coffey	8	1984
3	Paul Coffey	7	1983
3	Evan Bouchard	7	2025
5	Evan Bouchard	6	2024

Assists
#	Player	A	Season
1	Evan Bouchard	26	2024
2	Paul Coffey	25	1985
3	Charlie Huddy	17	1985
4	Chris Pronger	16	2006
5	Evan Bouchard	16	2025

Points
#	Player	Pts	Season
1	Paul Coffey	37	1985
2	Evan Bouchard	32	2024
3	Evan Bouchard	23	2025
4	Paul Coffey	22	1984
5	Chris Pronger	21	2006

Penalties in minutes
#	Player	PIM	Season
1	Marty McSorley	67	1988
2	Marty McSorley	65	1987
3	Don Jackson	64	1985
4	Steve Smith	55	1988
5	Marty McSorley	50	1986

=== Goaltenders ===
Wins
#	Player	W	Season
1	Grant Fuhr	16	1988
1	Bill Ranford	16	1990
3	Grant Fuhr	15	1985
4	Grant Fuhr	14	1987
4	Stuart Skinner	14	2024

Losses
#	Player	L	Season
1	Stuart Skinner	9	2024
2	Bill Ranford	8	1992
3	Bill Ranford	7	1991
3	Curtis Joseph	7	1997
3	Curtis Joseph	7	1998

== Single game records ==
=== Team ===
Record	Total	Date
Longest winning streak	16 games – 15 wins, 1 SO win	December 21, 2023 – January 27, 2024
Longest winning streak, without shootout win	12 games	December 31, 2023 – January 27, 2024
Longest home winning streak	10 games	March 14 – October 4, 2017
Longest road winning streak	10 games	April 17 – October 30, 2021
Longest winning streak, same team	14 games	April 1, 1983 – January 6, 1985 vs. Jets
Longest home winning streak, same team	14 games	February 11, 1983 – February 2, 1992 vs. Nordiques
Longest road winning streak, same team	8 games	February 21, 1982 – January 13, 1987 vs. Red Wings
Longest unbeaten streak	18 games – 15 wins, 3 ties	March 25 – November 9, 1984
Longest home unbeaten streak	16 games – 13 wins, 2 SO wins, 1 SO loss	March 9 – October 12, 2022
Longest road unbeaten streak	10 games – 10 wins	April 17 – October 30, 2021
Longest unbeaten streak from start of season	15 games – 12 wins, 3 ties	October 11 – November 9, 1984 (NHL record)
Longest unbeaten streak, same team	24 games – 21 wins, 3 ties	November 5, 1985 – March 12, 1988 vs. Canucks
Longest home unbeaten streak, same team	19 games – 15 wins, 4 ties	March 20, 1981 – March 31, 1991 vs. North Stars
Longest road unbeaten streak, same team	12 games – 10 wins, 2 ties	November 5, 1985 – March 12, 1988 vs. Canucks
Longest losing streak	13 games – 11 losses, 2 OT losses	December 31, 2009 – January 30, 2010
Longest home losing streak	9 games	October 16 – November 24, 1993
Longest road losing streak	11 games – 11 losses 11 games – 7 losses, 4 OT losses	December 23, 2009 – February 10, 2010; November 11 – December 31, 2014
Longest losing streak, same team	13 games – 10 losses, 3 OT losses	November 6, 2001 – November 6, 2015 vs. Bruins
Longest home losing streak, same team	9 games	January 29, 1992 – January 31, 1996 vs. Blackhawks
Longest road losing streak, same team	12 games	February 16, 1996 – December 7, 2001 vs. Stars
Longest winless streak	14 games – 13 losses, 1 tie	October 11 – November 7, 1993
Longest home winless streak	9 games – 9 losses	October 16 – November 24, 1993
Longest road winless streak	13 games – 12 losses, 1 tie	March 18 – November 7, 1993
Longest road stretch without regulation win	28 games – 2 SO wins, 22 losses, 4 SO losses	December 23, 2009 – October 28, 2010
Longest stretch without regulation win, same team	19 games – 12 losses, 3 OT losses, 1 SO loss, 3 SO wins	October 23, 2013 – November 27, 2016 vs. Coyotes
Longest home stretch without regulation win, same team	15 games – 10 losses, 1 OT loss, 2 SO losses, 2 SO wins	January 5, 2010 – November 27, 2016 vs. Coyotes
Longest road winless streak, same team	17 games – 14 losses, 1 OT loss, 2 SO losses	February 25, 2007 – October 13, 2011 vs. Wild
Longest consecutive games streak without being shut out	229 games	March 15, 1981 – February 11, 1984
Longest stretch without scoring a goal	207 minutes, 44 seconds	April 1, 2007 – April 7, 2007
Longest consecutive streak of games in overtime	5 games	December 10–18, 2008
Goals for	13	Oilers 13, Devils 4 – November 19, 1983; Oilers 13, Canucks 0 – November 8, 1985
Goals against	11	Oilers 3, Jets 11 – October 29, 1976; Oilers 1, Jets 11 – February 1, 1977; Oilers 0, Whalers 11 – February 12, 1984; Oilers 9, Maple Leafs 11 – January 8, 1986
Goals for, one period	7	Third period, Oilers 10, Canucks 7 – October 18, 1983; Second period, Oilers 9, Maple Leafs 4 – February 19, 1985; Third period, Oilers 13, Canucks 0 – November 8, 1985
Goals against, one period	7	First period, Oilers 1, Bruins 7 – January 17, 1980
Total goals	21	Oilers 12, Blackhawks 9 – December 11, 1985 (ties NHL record)
Most shots on goal	69	Oilers 69, Finland 23 – March 20, 1979
Most shots on goal	57	Oilers 57, Lightning 24 – December 14, 2023
Most shots on goal against	59	Oilers 36, Rangers 59 (OT) – March 17, 1993; Oilers 27, Sharks 59 – January 29, 2014
Least shots on goal	11	Oilers 11, Bruins 21 – October 20, 1989; Oilers 11, Blues 22 – November 5, 1999; Oilers 11, Avalanche 25 – November 24, 2001
Least shots on goal against	11	Oilers 29, Blackhawks 11 – October 9, 2001
Shots on goal, one period	33	Second period, Oilers 69, Finland 23 – March 20, 1979
Shots on goal, one period	26	Second period, Oilers 47, Penguins 35 – October 24, 2022
Shots on goal against, one period	29	Second period, Oilers 21, Red Wings 46 – November 7, 1979
Most total shots on goal	100	Oilers 48, North Stars 52 – December 11, 1982
Least total shots on goal	32	Oilers 11, Bruins 21 – October 20, 1989
Largest shots on goal differential for	46	Oilers 69, Finland 23 – March 20, 1979
Largest shots on goal differential for	34	Oilers 53, Rockies 19 – October 24, 1981
Largest shots on goal differential against	–39	Oilers 16, Kings 55 (SO) – April 10, 2010
Fastest two goals	6 seconds	December 30, 1977 (First period vs. Racers. Dennis Sobchuk at 11:07 and 11:13. Goaltender were Peter McDuffe and Gary Inness).
Fastest two goals	7 seconds	November 23, 2009 (First period vs. Coyotes. Sheldon Souray at 11:07 and Ales Hemsky at 11:14. Goaltender was Ilya Bryzgalov).
Fastest two goals by defencemen	12 seconds	March 1, 1994 (Second period vs. Canucks. Ilya Byakin at 1:40 and Luke Richardson at 1:52. Goaltender was Kirk McLean).
Fastest three goals	40 seconds	March 20, 1979 (Second period vs. Finland. Stan Weir at 2:12, Dennis Sobchuk at 2:28, and Stan Weir at 2:52. Goaltender was Jorma Virtanen).
Fastest three goals	45 seconds	March 25, 1981 (Third period vs. Whalers. Wayne Gretzky at 19:04, Mark Messier at 19:18, and Glenn Anderson at 19:49. Oilers won 7 – 2, and all three goals were scored into an empty net).
Fastest three goals by defencemen	1 minute, 57 seconds	January 26, 2026 (Second period vs. Ducks. Mattias Ekholm at 6:28, Darnell Nurse at 7:34, and Mattias Ekholm at 8:25. Goaltender was Ville Husso).
Fastest four goals	1 minute, 41 seconds	January 20, 1982 (Third period vs. Blues. Tom Roulston at 13:57, Dave Lumley at 14:17, Wayne Gretzky at 15:30, and Glenn Anderson at 15:38. Goaltender was Gary Edwards).
Fastest four goals by defencemen	3 minutes, 49 seconds	January 26, 2026 (Second period vs. Ducks. Spencer Stastney at 4:36, Mattias Ekholm at 6:28, Darnell Nurse at 7:34, and Mattias Ekholm at 8:25. Goaltender was Ville Husso).
Fastest five goals	3 minutes, 35 seconds	April 27, 2013 (Third period vs. Canucks. Justin Schultz at 13:17, Nail Yakupov at 14:16, Jordan Eberle at 14:37, Nail Yakupov at 15:47, and Jerred Smithson at 16:52. Goaltender was Roberto Luongo).
Fastest goal from start of a game	8 seconds	December 14, 1983 vs. Rangers (Wayne Gretzky. Goaltender was Glen Hanlon).
Fastest goal from start of a game	8 seconds	January 31, 2021 vs. Senators (Dominik Kahun. Goaltender was Matt Murray).
Fastest goal from start of a game by defenceman	13 seconds	October 16, 1987 vs. Flames (John Miner. Goaltender was Mike Vernon).
Fastest two goals from start of a game	24 seconds	March 28, 1982 vs. Kings (Mark Messier at 0:14 and Dave Lumley at 0:24. Goaltender was Doug Keans).
Fastest two goals from start of a game by defencemen	2 minutes, 36 seconds	March 27, 1984 vs. Flames (Charlie Huddy at 1:04 and Don Jackson at 2:36. Goaltender was Rejean Lemelin).
Fastest three goals from start of a game	2 minutes, 43 seconds	March 30, 2013 vs. Canucks (Taylor Hall at 0:16, Ladislav Smid at 2:05, and Taylor Hall at 2:43. Goaltenders were Cory Schneider [2] and Roberto Luongo [1]).
Fastest goal from start of a period	6 seconds	March 17, 1984 (Third period vs. Kings. Glenn Anderson at 0:06. Goaltender was Markus Mattsson).
Fastest goal from start of a period by defenceman	7 seconds	December 27, 1980 (Third period vs. Red Wings. Risto Siltanen at 0:07. Goaltender was Larry Lozinski).
Fastest two goals from start of a period	24 seconds	March 28, 1982 (First period vs. Kings. Mark Messier at 0:14 and Dave Lumley at 0:24. Goaltender was Doug Keans). (NHL record)
Fastest two goals from start of a period by defencemen	50 seconds	December 27, 1980 (Third period vs. Red Wings. Risto Siltanen at 0:07 and 0:50. Goaltender was Larry Lozinski).
Fastest three goals from start of a period	2 minutes, 27 seconds	December 4, 1982 vs. Flames (Wayne Gretzky at 0:33, Jari Kurri at 1:31, and Ken Linseman at 2:27. Goaltender was Don Edwards).
Fastest two goals by the same player	6 seconds	December 30, 1977 (First period vs. Racers. Dennis Sobchuk at 11:07 and 11:13. Goaltender were Peter McDuffe and Gary Inness).
Fastest two goals by the same player	8 seconds	October 17, 2013 (First period vs. Islanders. Taylor Hall at 15:52 and 16:00. Goaltender was Evgeni Nabokov).
Fastest two goals by the same defenceman	43 seconds	December 27, 1980 (Third period vs. Red Wings. Risto Siltanen at 0:07 and 0:50. Goaltender was Larry Lozinski).
Fastest two goals from start of a game by the same player	42 seconds	April 4, 1987 vs. Kings (Kent Nilsson at 0:30 and 0:42. Goaltender was Roland Melanson).
Fastest two goals from start of a game by the same defenceman	4 minutes, 36 seconds	November 21, 1983 vs. Jets (Paul Coffey at 2:12 and at 4:36. Goaltender was Brian Hayward).
Fastest hat trick for in one game	2 minutes, 1 second	October 12, 2006 vs. Sharks by Ryan Smyth at 4:05, 4:19, and 6:06. Goaltender was Evgeni Nabokov.
Fastest hat trick from start of a game	7 minutes, 53 seconds	March 30, 2013 vs. Canucks by Taylor Hall. Goaltenders were Cory Schneider [1] and Roberto Luongo [2].
Longest shutout sequence	192 minutes, 53 seconds	March 2 – 11, 2001 by Tommy Salo.
Fastest overtime goal, playoffs	21 seconds	April 5, 1984 vs. Jets by Randy Gregg. Goaltender was Marc Behrend.
Longest overtime goal, playoffs	55 minutes, 13 seconds	May 15, 1990 vs. Bruins by Petr Klíma. Goaltender was Andy Moog.
Latest series-winning goal in regulation	1 minute, 6 seconds left	May 1, 2006 vs. Red Wings by Aleš Hemský. Goaltender was Manny Legace.
Earliest series-winning goal in regulation	58 minutes, 21 seconds left	April 28, 1992 vs. Kings by Josef Beránek. Goaltender was Kelly Hrudey.

=== Player ===
Record	Total	Player and date
Most goals	5	Ron Climie – November 6, 1973 vs. Blades (Goaltender was Joe Junkin). Wayne Gretzky – February 18, 1981 vs. Blues (Goaltenders were Mike Liut [3] and Ed Staniowski [2]). Wayne Gretzky – December 30, 1981 vs. Flyers (Goaltender was Pete Peeters [4]. Gretzky also scored one goal into an empty net). Jari Kurri – November 19, 1983 vs. Devils (Goaltenders were Ron Low [2] and Glenn Resch [3]). Pat Hughes – February 3, 1984 vs. Flames (Goaltenders were Don Edwards [2] and Rejean Lemelin [3]). Wayne Gretzky – December 15, 1984 vs. Blues (Goaltender was Rick Wamsley). Wayne Gretzky – December 6, 1987 vs. North Stars (Goaltenders were Don Beaupre [4] and Kari Takko [1]).
Most goals, perfect shooting percentage	5	Wayne Gretzky – December 15, 1984 vs. Blues (Goaltender was Rick Wamsley). (ties NHL record)
Most goals by a defenceman	4	Paul Coffey – December 26, 1984 vs. Flames (Goaltender was Rejean Lemelin).
Most goals by a defenceman, perfect shooting percentage	3	Marc-Andre Bergeron – January 14, 2006 vs. Senators (Goaltender was Dominik Hasek). (ties NHL record)
Most goals, one home game	5	Ron Climie – November 6, 1973 vs. Blades (Goaltender was Joe Junkin). Wayne Gretzky – February 18, 1981 vs. Blues (Goaltenders were Mike Liut [3] and Ed Staniowski [2]). Wayne Gretzky – December 30, 1981 vs. Flyers (Goaltender was Pete Peeters [4]. Gretzky also scored one goal into an empty net). Jari Kurri – November 19, 1983 vs. Devils (Goaltenders were Ron Low [2] and Glenn Resch [3]). Pat Hughes – February 3, 1984 vs. Flames (Goaltenders were Don Edwards [2] and Rejean Lemelin [3]). Wayne Gretzky – December 6, 1987 vs. North Stars (Goaltenders were Don Beaupre [4] and Kari Takko [1]).
Most goals by a defenceman, one home game	3	Ken Baird – November 13, 1974 vs. Jets (Goaltender was Joe Daley). Risto Siltanen – April 4, 1981 vs. Jets (Goaltender was Markus Mattsson). Paul Coffey – December 20, 1985 vs. Kings (Goaltender was Darren Eliot). Marc-Andre Bergeron – January 14, 2006 vs. Senators (Goaltender was Dominik Hasek). Evan Bouchard – January 24, 2026 vs. Capitals (Goaltender was Charlie Lindgren).
Most goals, one away game	5	Wayne Gretzky – December 15, 1984 vs. Blues (Goaltender was Rick Wamsley).
Most goals by a defenceman, one away game	4	Paul Coffey – December 26, 1984 vs. Flames (Goaltender was Rejean Lemelin).
Most power play goals	3	Glenn Anderson – March 20, 1985 vs. Blackhawks (Goaltender was Warren Skorodenski). Glenn Anderson – November 19, 1988 vs. Maple Leafs (Goaltenders was Ken Wregget). Taylor Hall – February 19, 2011 vs. Thrashers (Goaltender was Chris Mason); Connor McDavid – November 14, 2019 vs. Avalanche (Goaltender was Adam Werner). Leon Draisaitl – December 23, 2025 vs. Flames (Goaltender was Dustin Wolf).
Most shorthanded goals	2	Wayne Gretzky – December 27, 1981 vs. Kings (Goaltender was Mario Lessard). Wayne Gretzky – March 25, 1982 vs. Flames (Goaltender was Rejean Lemelin). Pat Hughes – January 11, 1983 vs. Blues (Goaltenders were Mike Liut and Rick Heinz). Wayne Gretzky – December 21, 1983 vs. Jets (Goaltender was Brian Hayward). Mark Messier – March 27, 1984 vs. Flames (Goaltender was Rejean Lemelin). Jari Kurri – December 20, 1985 vs. Kings (Goaltender was Darren Eliot). Paul Coffey – February 14, 1986 vs. Nordiques (Goaltenders were Clint Malarchuk and Mario Gosselin). Mark Messier – March 25, 1986 vs. Red Wings (Goaltender was Eddie Mio). Wayne Gretzky – December 12, 1987 vs. Canucks (Goaltender was Kirk McLean). Craig MacTavish – October 23, 1988 vs. Canucks (Goaltender was Kirk McLean). Esa Tikkanen – November 12, 1988 vs. Maple Leafs (Goaltender was Allan Bester). Mark Messier – March 3, 1990 vs. Flyers (Goaltender was Ron Hextall). Ethan Moreau – December 8, 2005 vs. Flyers (Goaltender was Antero Niittymäki).
Most goals, one period	4	Ron Climie – Third period, November 6, 1973 vs. Blades (Goaltender was Joe Junkin). Wayne Gretzky – Third period, February 18, 1981 vs. Blues (Goaltenders were Mike Liut [2] and Ed Staniowski [2]).
Most goals by a defenceman, one period	3	Paul Coffey – Third period, March 31, 1985 vs. Blackhawks (Goaltender was Warren Skorodenski).
Most power play goals, one period	3	Taylor Hall – Third period, February 19, 2011 vs. Thrashers (Goaltender was Chris Mason).
Most shorthanded goals, one period	2	Wayne Gretzky – Second period, March 25, 1982 vs. Flames (Goaltender was Rejean Lemelin). Pat Hughes – Second period, January 11, 1983 vs. Blues (Goaltenders were Mike Liut and Rick Heinz). Paul Coffey – Third period, February 14, 1986 vs. Nordiques (Goaltenders were Clint Malarchuk and Mario Gosselin). Mark Messier – Second period, March 25, 1986 vs. Red Wings (Goaltender was Eddie Mio). Esa Tikkanen – First period, November 12, 1988 vs. Maple Leafs (Goaltender was Allan Bester).
Most assists	7	Jim Harrison – January 30, 1973 vs. Raiders (Goaltenders were Ian Wilkie and Gary Kurt); Wayne Gretzky – February 15, 1980 vs. Capitals (Goaltender was Wayne Stephenson). (ties NHL record); Wayne Gretzky – December 11, 1985 vs. Blackhawks (Goaltenders were Murray Bannerman [5] and Bob Sauve [2]). (ties NHL record); Wayne Gretzky – February 14, 1986 vs. Nordiques (Goaltenders were Clint Malarchuk [3] and Mario Gosselin [4]). (ties NHL record)
Most assists by a defenceman	6	Paul Coffey – March 14, 1986 vs. Red Wings (Goaltenders were Greg Stefan [4] and Eddie Mio [2]). (tie NHL record)
Most assists by a goaltender	2	Eddie Mio – February 6, 1981 vs. Jets (Goaltender was Pierre Hamel). Eddie Mio – February 27, 1981 vs. Red Wings (Goaltender was Gilles Gilbert). Gary Edwards – April 4, 1981 vs. Jets (Goaltender was Markus Mattsson). Grant Fuhr – February 7, 1982 vs. Rangers (Goaltender was Eddie Mio). Grant Fuhr – November 6, 1983 vs. Jets (Goaltender was Doug Soetaert).
Most assists, one home game	7	Jim Harrison – January 30, 1973 vs. Raiders (Goaltenders were Ian Wilkie and Gary Kurt); Wayne Gretzky – February 15, 1980 vs. Capials (Goaltender was Wayne Stephenson). (ties NHL record); Wayne Gretzky – February 14, 1986 vs. Nordiques (Goaltenders were Clint Malarchuk [3] and Mario Gosselin [4]). (ties NHL record)
Most assists by a defenceman, one home game	6	Paul Coffey – March 14, 1986 vs. Red Wings (Goaltenders were Greg Stefan [4] and Eddie Mio [2]). (tie NHL record)
Most assists, one away game	7	Wayne Gretzky – December 11, 1985 vs. Blackhawks (Goaltenders were Murray Bannerman [5] and Bob Sauve [2]). (ties NHL record)
Most assists by a defenceman, one away game	5	Kevin Lowe – February 19, 1983 vs. Penguins (Goaltenders were Denis Herron and Nick Ricci).
Most assists, one period	4	Jim Harrison – Third period, January 30, 1973 vs. Raiders (Goaltenders were Ian Wilkie and Gary Kurt). Wayne Gretzky – First period, February 4, 1983 vs. Canadiens (Goaltender was Rick Wamsley). Jari Kurri – Second period, October 7, 1983 vs. Jets (Goaltender was Brian Hayward). Mark Messier – Second period, January 4, 1984 vs. North Stars (Goaltender was Gilles Meloche). Wayne Gretzky – Second period, October 26, 1984 vs. Kings (Goaltender was Darren Eliot). Wayne Gretzky – Third period, October 15, 1986 vs. Nordiques (Goaltender was Clint Malarchuk). Wayne Gretzky – Second period, February 18, 1987 vs. Maple Leafs (Goaltender was Allan Bester). Wayne Gretzky – Third period, November 14, 1987 vs. Blues (Goaltender was Rick Wamsley). Wayne Gretzky – First period, March 4, 1988 vs. Flyers (Goaltender was Mark LaForest). Wayne Gretzky – Second period, March 7, 1988 vs. Jets (Goaltender was Daniel Berthiaume). Connor McDavid – Third period, February 13, 2024 vs. Red Wings (Goaltender was Alex Lyon).
Most assists by a defenceman, one period	3	Doug Barrie – Third period, January 30, 1973 vs. Raiders (Goaltenders were Ian Wilkie and Gary Kurt). Doug Barrie – Second period, January 1, 1974 vs. Jets (Goaltender was Joe Daley). Al Hamilton – Third period, October 26, 1977 vs. Aeros (Goaltender was Wayne Rutledge). Barry Wilkins – Third period, January 23, 1979 vs. Roadrunners (Goaltender was Gary Kurt). Al Hamilton – Second period, March 20, 1979 vs. Finland (Goaltender was Jorma Virtanen). Kevin Lowe – Third period, February 19, 1983 vs. Penguins (Goaltender were Denis Herron and Nick Ricci). Kevin Lowe – First period, November 19, 1983 vs. Devils (Goaltender was Ron Low). Charlie Huddy – First period, January 4, 1984 vs. North Stars (Goaltender was Don Beaupre). Paul Coffey – Second period, February 17, 1984 vs. Bruins (Goaltender was Doug Keans). Paul Coffey – Third period, March 17, 1984 vs. Kings (Goaltender was Markus Mattsson). Paul Coffey – Third period, December 22, 1985 vs. Jets (Goaltender was Brian Hayward). Randy Gregg – Second period, February 19, 1986 vs. Maple Leafs (Goaltender was Ken Wregget). Reed Larson – Third period, November 19, 1988 vs. Maple Leafs (Goaltender was Ken Wregget). Steve Smith – Second period, March 8, 1991 vs. Flyers (Goaltender was Ken Wregget). Dave Manson – First period, October 23, 1991 vs. Capitals (Goaltender was Jim Hrivnak). Jeff Petry – First period, November 19, 2011 vs. Blackhawks (Goaltender were Corey Crawford [2] and Ray Emery [1]). Oscar Klefbom – Third period, April 6, 2017 vs. Sharks (Goaltender was Martin Jones). Oscar Klefbom – First period, March 26, 2019 vs. Kings (Goaltender was Jonathan Quick).
Most assists by a goaltender, one period	2	Eddie Mio – Third period, February 6, 1981 vs. Jets (Goaltender was Pierre Hamel). Gary Edwards – Third period, April 4, 1981 vs. Jets (Goaltender was Markus Mattsson). Grant Fuhr – Third period, November 6, 1983 vs. Jets (Goaltender was Doug Soetaert).
Most points	10	Jim Harrison – January 30, 1973 vs. Raiders (3 goals, 7 assists. Goaltenders were Ian Wilkie and Gary Kurt).
Most points	8	Wayne Gretzky – November 19, 1983 vs. Devils (3 goals, 5 assists. Goaltenders were Ron Low [5] and Glenn Resch [3]). Wayne Gretzky – January 4, 1984 vs. North Stars (4 goals, 4 assists. Goaltenders were Don Beaupre [4] and Gilles Meloche [4]). Paul Coffey – March 14, 1986 vs. Red Wings (2 goals, 6 assists. Goaltenders were Greg Stefan [5] and Eddie Mio [3]). Sam Gagner – February 2, 2012 vs Blackhawks (4 goals, 4 assists. Goaltenders were Corey Crawford [5] and Ray Emery [3]).
Most points by a defenceman	8	Paul Coffey – March 14, 1986 vs. Red Wings (2 goals, 6 assists. Goaltenders were Greg Stefan [5] and Eddie Mio [3]). (ties NHL record)
Most points, one home game	10	Jim Harrison – January 30, 1973 vs. Raiders (3 goals, 7 assists. Goaltenders were Ian Wilkie and Gary Kurt).
Most points, one home game	8	Wayne Gretzky – November 19, 1983 vs. Devils (3 goals, 5 assists. Goaltenders were Ron Low [5] and Glenn Resch [3]). Wayne Gretzky – January 4, 1984 vs. North Stars (4 goals, 4 assists. Goaltenders were Don Beaupre [4] and Gilles Meloche [4]). Paul Coffey – March 14, 1986 vs. Red Wings (2 goals, 6 assists. Goaltenders were Greg Stefan [5] and Eddie Mio [3]). Sam Gagner – February 2, 2012 vs Blackhawks (4 goals, 4 assists. Goaltenders were Corey Crawford [5] and Ray Emery [3]).
Most points by a defenceman, one home game	8	Paul Coffey – March 14, 1986 vs. Red Wings (2 goals, 6 assists. Goaltenders were Greg Stefan [5] and Eddie Mio [3]).
Most points, one away game	7	Wayne Gretzky – November 6, 1983 vs. Jets (4 goals, 3 assists. Goaltender was Doug Soetaert).
Most points by a defenceman, one away game	6	Kevin Lowe – February 19, 1983 vs. Penguins (Goaltenders were Denis Herron and Nick Ricci). Paul Coffey – March 29, 1985 vs. Whalers (Goaltender was Steve Weeks).
Most points, one period	5	Jari Kurri – Second period, October 26, 1984 vs. Kings (2 goals, 3 assists. Goaltender was Darren Eliot). Sam Gagner – Third period, February 2, 2012 vs. Blackhawks (3 goals, 2 assists. Goaltenders were Corey Crawford [2] and Ray Emery [3]).
Most points by a defenceman, one period	4	Doug Barrie – Third period, January 30, 1973 vs. Raiders (1 goal, 3 assists. Goaltenders were Ian Wilkie and Gary Kurt). Barry Wilkins – Third period, January 23, 1979 vs. Roadrunners (1 goal, 3 assists. Goaltender was Gary Kurt). Paul Coffey – Third period, March 31, 1985 vs. Blackhawks (3 goals, 1 assist. Goaltender was Warren Skorodenski).
Most penalty minutes	42	Dave Semenko – March 13, 1982 vs. Canucks (1 minor, 2 majors, 2 ten minute misconducts, 1 match penalty).
Most penalty minutes, one period	41	Lee Fogolin – March 28, 1981 vs. Red Wings (3 minors, 1 major, 1 ten minute misconduct, 1 game misconduct, 1 gross misconduct).
Most penalty minutes by a goaltender	17	Ty Conklin – February 11, 2004 vs. Thrashers (1 minor, 1 major, 1 game misconduct).
Most shots on goal	13	Paul Coffey – December 20, 1985 vs. Kings (3 goals). Wayne Gretzky – December 6, 1987 vs. North Stars (5 goals). Doug Weight – October 15, 1997 vs. Avalanche (0 goal).
Most shots on goal, one home game	13	Paul Coffey – December 20, 1985 vs. Kings (3 goals). Wayne Gretzky – December 6, 1987 vs. North Stars (5 goals). Doug Weight – October 15, 1997 vs. Avalanche (0 goal).
Most shots on goal, one away game	12	Wayne Gretzky – April 2, 1985 vs. Kings (3 goals).
Most shots on goal without scoring a goal	13	Doug Weight – October 15, 1997 vs. Avalanche.
Most shots on goal without scoring a goal, one home game	13	Doug Weight – October 15, 1997 vs. Avalanche.
Most shots on goal without scoring a goal, one away game	10	Paul Coffey – February 22, 1983 vs. Flames. Raffi Torres – November 7, 2007 vs. Avalanche. Zach Hyman – November 23, 2022 vs. Islanders. Evan Bouchard – January 9, 2025 vs. Penguins.

== Miscellaneous ==
- October 1984 became the first calendar month in Oilers history where the team did not record a single loss.
- January 2010 became the first calendar month in Oilers history where the team did not record a single win.
- Longest consecutive goal streak:
  - Dave Lumley, 12 (15 goals, 13 assists; November 21 - December 16, 1981).
  - Wayne Gretzky, 12 (16 goals, 18 assists; March 26 - October 20, 1983).
- Longest consecutive goal streak, rookie: Jari Kurri, 6 (7 goals, 4 assists; March 21 - April 1, 1981).
- Longest consecutive goal streak, from start of season: Wayne Gretzky, 8 (11 goals, 10 assists; October 5 - 20, 1983).
- Longest consecutive assist streak:
  - Wayne Gretzky, 17 (18 goals, 38 assists; November 26, 1983 - January 4, 1984).
  - Paul Coffey, 17 (9 goals, 27 assists; November 27, 1985 - January 2, 1986).
- Longest consecutive assist streak, rookie: Sam Gagner, 8 (2 goals, 9 assists; February 4 - 22, 2008).
- Longest consecutive assist streak, from start of season: Wayne Gretzky, 12 (7 goals, 20 assists; October 5 - 29, 1982).
- Longest consecutive point streak: Wayne Gretzky, 60 (70 goals, 111 assists; March 13, 1983 - January 27, 1984).
- Longest consecutive point streak, rookie: Miroslav Šatan, 11 (6 goals, 9 assists; February 28 - March 23, 1996).
- Longest consecutive point streak, from start of season: Wayne Gretzky, 51 (61 goals, 92 assists; October 5, 1983 - January 27, 1984).
- Longest winning streak:
  - Andy Moog, 10 (March 11 - October 19, 1983).
  - Grant Fuhr, 10 (February 14 - March 25, 1986).
- Longest home winning streak: Andy Moog, 13 (February 4 - November 18, 1983).
- Longest road winning streak:
  - Andy Moog, 7 (December 14, 1983 - January 25, 1984).
  - Devan Dubnyk, 7 (February 21 - April 1, 2012).
- Most assists before scoring the first goal of the season: Ryan Whitney, 24 (2010–11).
- Most assists before scoring the first goal of the season by a forward: Ryan Nugent-Hopkins, 17 (2021–22).
- Most hat-tricks, career: Wayne Gretzky, 55.
- Most four goals or more in a game: Wayne Gretzky, 15.
- Most five goals or more in a game: Wayne Gretzky, 4.

== See also ==
- List of Edmonton Oilers players
- List of NHL statistical leaders
- 50 goals in 50 games
- List of NHL players
