= Evan Bouchard =

Canadian ice hockey player (born 1999)

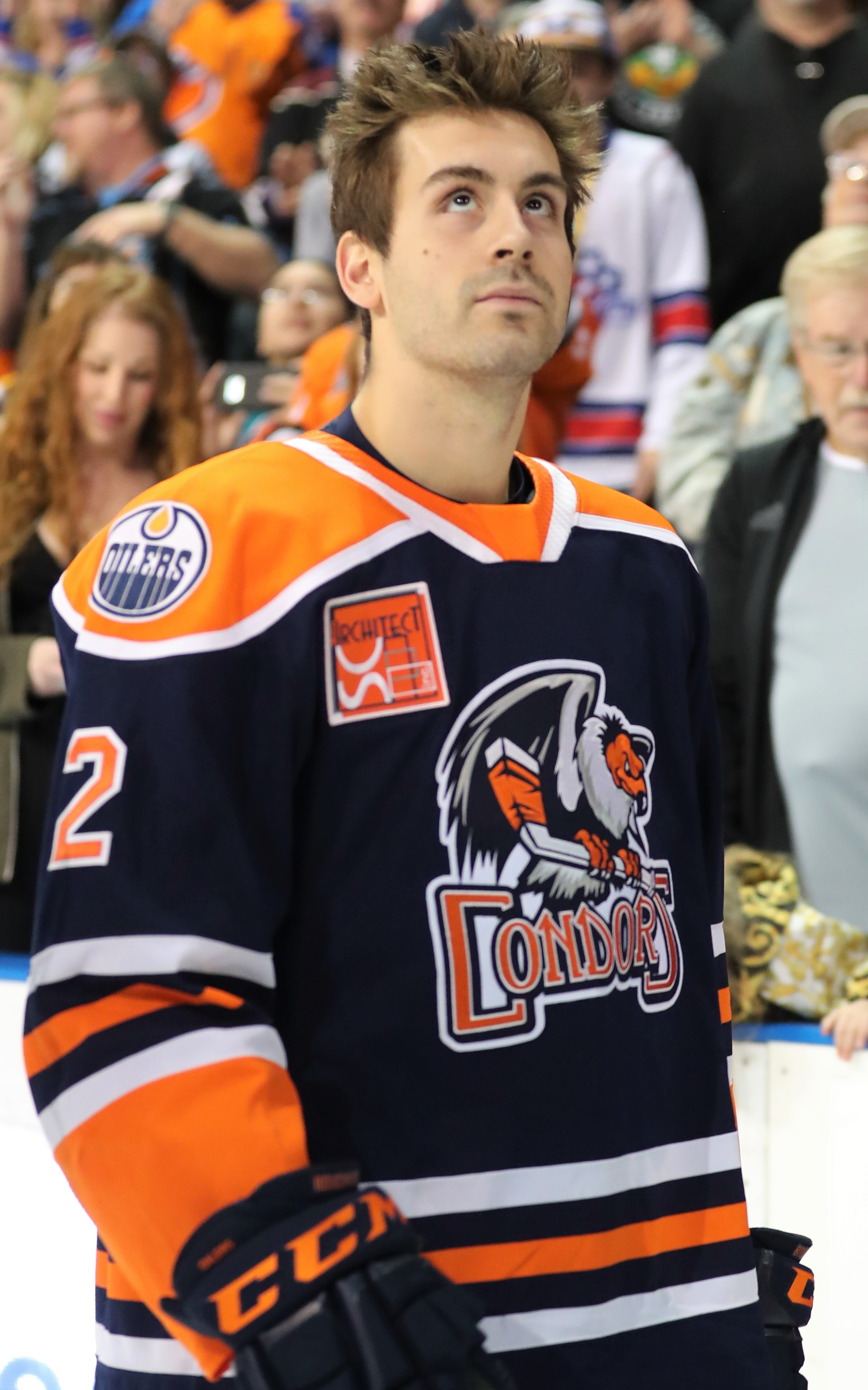
- Bouchard with the Bakersfield Condors in 2020
- Born: October 20, 1999 (age 27) Oakville, Ontario, Canada
- Height: 6 ft 2 in (188 cm)
- Weight: 196 lb (89 kg; 14 st 0 lb)
- Position: Defence
- Shoots: Right
- NHL team: Edmonton Oilers
- National team: Canada
- NHL draft: 10th overall, 2018; Edmonton Oilers
- Playing career: 2018–present

Evan Bouchard (born October 20, 1999) is a Canadian professional ice hockey player who is a defenceman and alternate captain for the Edmonton Oilers of the National Hockey League (NHL). Bouchard was selected 10th overall by the Oilers in the 2018 NHL entry draft.

== Playing career ==
=== Junior ===
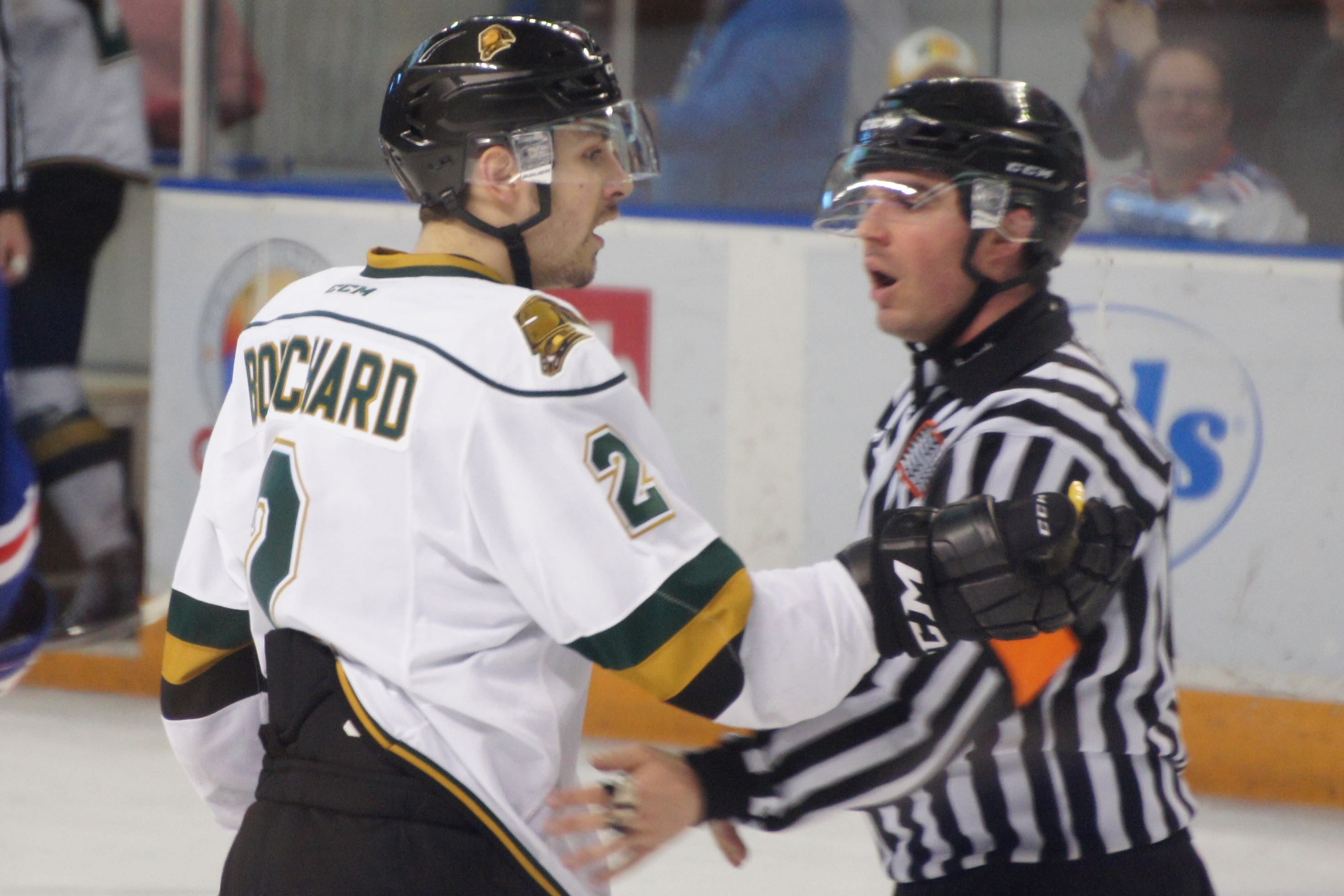
Bouchard with the London Knights in 2016

Bouchard was drafted in the first round, 17th overall, in the 2015 OHL Priority Selection by the London Knights. He helped London capture the J. Ross Robertson Cup and 2016 Memorial Cup in his first year with the organization. Bouchard was named captain of the Knights for the 2017–18 OHL season. At the conclusion of the year, Bouchard was named a finalist for the Max Kaminsky Trophy as defenceman of the year and the Red Tilson Trophy as most valuable player of the Ontario Hockey League (OHL).

=== Professional ===
Bouchard was selected in the first round, 10th overall by the Edmonton Oilers in the 2018 NHL entry draft. A few weeks later on July 17, 2018, the Oilers signed Bouchard to a three-year, entry-level contract. On October 25, Bouchard became the youngest Oilers defenceman in history to record a goal when he scored in a 4–1 win over the Washington Capitals. He had turned 19 five days before the game. After seven games with the Oilers, he was returned to the Knights on November 2. Despite only skating in 45 games for the Knights during the 2018–19 season, Bouchard recorded 16 goals and 53 points. He added another 21 points in 11 games during the OHL postseason. On April 25, 2019, Bouchard was named the winner of the Max Kaminsky Trophy as the league's top defenceman.

Due to the COVID-19 pandemic's effect on the American Hockey League (AHL), he spent part of the 2020–21 season with Södertälje SK of Sweden's HockeyAllsvenskan. He then joined the Oilers for the shortened regular season, though it was noted that he had some difficulty getting ice time despite solid play.

In the 2021–22 season, Bouchard solidified his place in the roster, managing 12 goals and 31 assists in 81 regular season games, pairing alongside future Hall of Famer Duncan Keith, while also leading the team's second power play unit. 35 of his points came at even strength play, ranked 14th among NHL defencemen. The Oilers qualified for the 2022 Stanley Cup playoffs, making a deep run to the Western Conference final before losing to the Colorado Avalanche.

On August 24, 2023, Bouchard signed a two-year, $7.8 million contract extension with an AAV of $3.9 million. Bouchard's offensive production doubled in the 2023–24 season, registering career highs in scoring with 18 goals and 64 assists for a total of 82 points, finishing fourth in the league among defencemen. He set a league record in the 2024 Stanley Cup playoffs for assists in one playoff year by a defenceman with 26, surpassing Paul Coffey, who himself obtained the record in 1985 as a member of the Oilers.

On June 30, 2025, Bouchard signed a four-year, $42 million contract extension with an AAV of $10.5 million. On January 24, 2026, his 400th game, Bouchard scored his first NHL hat-trick against the Washington Capitals in a 6–5 overtime win, becoming the first Oilers' defender to score three since Marc-André Bergeron, just over 20 years prior. He factored in on all six goals, setting a career high in goals and points in a single game, as well as becoming the first Oilers' defenceman to have a six-point game since Paul Coffey did so on March 14, 1986. He also joined Bobby Orr as the only defenceman in league history to have six points and eight shots in a single game. On March 26, Bouchard scored the overtime winner against the Vegas Golden Knights, marking his 20th goal of the season. The goal made him the fourth Oilers' defenceman to reach 20 goals in a season, with the others being Coffey, Charlie Huddy, and Sheldon Souray. On April 8, Bouchard registered his 90th point of the season, joining Coffey as the second Oilers' defenceman to reach 90 points in a season. Bouchard would lead all defencemen in points at the end of the season, with 95. The Oilers would end up losing to the Anaheim Ducks in six games in the first round of the 2026 Stanley Cup playoffs. Despite his efforts, Bouchard was not a finalist for the James Norris Memorial Trophy, awarded annually to the defenceman voted the best at his position by the Professional Hockey Writers' Association. He finished the year fourth in Norris voting, making the second NHL All-Star team.

On September 17, 2026, Bouchard was named alternate captain for the Oilers, replacing Darnell Nurse. Bouchard started the 2026–27 campaign by scoring his second career hat-trick and adding two assists in a 6–5 overtime loss to the Vancouver Canucks on September 29, becoming the first Oilers defenceman to open the season with a multi-goal game, the first defenceman since Mark Howe in 1980–81 to open a season with a hat-trick, and the first defenceman in league history to record five points in a season opener. Just two days later, Bouchard had a goal and two assists in a 9–7 win over the Canucks to get his eighth point of the season, breaking Harry Cameron's record for the most points in the first two games of a season by a defenceman set over 100 years prior. The same performance also saw him break Wayne Gretzky's record for the most points in the first two games of a season by an Edmonton Oiler. On November 5, Bouchard became the fastest defender in Oilers history to score 10 goals in a season, doing so in his 17th game, breaking Paul Coffey's record of 22 games.

== International play ==
On December 3, 2018, Bouchard was loaned to Canada junior team to compete for a roster spot on their 2019 World Junior Championships team. On December 25, Bouchard was named an alternate captain for Canada, along with Jaret Anderson-Dolan and Ian Mitchell, for the 2019 World Junior Championships.

On May 5, 2026, Bouchard and Oilers teammate Darnell Nurse were added to Canada senior team's roster for the 2026 World Championship, which was Bouchard's senior debut for his country. Following an illegal check to the head by Ryan Lindgren in an eventual 4–0 quarterfinals win against the United States on May 28, Bouchard left the game and was unable to play for the remainder of the tournament.

== Career statistics ==
=== Regular season and playoffs ===
Figures in boldface italics are NHL records for defencemen.

			Regular season					Playoffs
Season	Team	League	GP	G	A	Pts	PIM	GP	G	A	Pts	PIM
2014–15	Oakville Blades	OJHL	1	0	1	1	0	—	—	—	—	—
2015–16	London Knights	OHL	43	2	15	17	24	10	0	2	2	2
2016–17	London Knights	OHL	68	11	33	44	24	14	3	4	7	6
2017–18	London Knights	OHL	67	25	62	87	54	4	1	4	5	6
2018–19	London Knights	OHL	45	16	37	53	40	11	4	17	21	6
2018–19	Edmonton Oilers	NHL	7	1	0	1	2	—	—	—	—	—
2018–19	Bakersfield Condors	AHL	—	—	—	—	—	8	3	5	8	6
2019–20	Bakersfield Condors	AHL	54	7	29	36	42	—	—	—	—	—
2020–21	Södertälje SK	Allsv	23	6	11	17	76	—	—	—	—	—
2020–21	Edmonton Oilers	NHL	14	2	3	5	2	—	—	—	—	—
2021–22	Edmonton Oilers	NHL	81	12	31	43	28	16	3	6	9	4
2022–23	Edmonton Oilers	NHL	82	8	32	40	28	12	4	13	17	4
2023–24	Edmonton Oilers	NHL	81	18	64	82	32	25	6	**26**	32	22
2024–25	Edmonton Oilers	NHL	82	14	53	67	32	22	7	16	23	8
2025–26	Edmonton Oilers	NHL	82	21	74	95	30	6	1	6	7	0
NHL totals			429	76	257	333	154	81	21	67	88	38

=== International ===
Year	Team	Event	Result	GP	G	A	Pts	PIM
2015	Canada White	U17	1st place, gold medalist(s)	6	1	5	6	4
2016	Canada	IH18	5th	4	0	0	0	0
2019	Canada	WJC	6th	5	0	3	3	0
2026	Canada	WC	4th	8	1	5	6	0
Junior totals				15	1	8	9	4
Senior totals				8	1	5	6	0

== Awards and honours ==
Award	Year	Ref
OHL
Max Kaminsky Trophy	2018–19	
AHL
All-Star Game	2020	
NHL
Second All-Star team	2026	

== Records ==
=== NHL ===
- Most assists in one playoff year by a defenceman – 26 in 2024
- One of two defencemen in league history to have six points and eight shots in a single game (the only other being Bobby Orr)
- Most goals in a season opener by a defenceman – 3 (tied with Mark Howe and Bert Corbeau)
- Most points in a season opener by a defenceman – 5
- Most points in the first two games of a season by a defenceman – 8

=== Edmonton Oilers ===
- Youngest defenceman to score their first NHL goal – 19 years, 5 days
- Latest regulation goal – 0.5 seconds, against Ottawa Senators
- Most game-winning goals in a season by a defenceman – 7 (2023–24)
- Most points in the first two games of a season – 8 (2026–27)
- Fastest to 10 goals in a season by a defenceman – 17 games (2026–27)
- Most career playoff assists by a defenceman – 67 (tied with Paul Coffey)
- Most career playoff game-winning goals by a defenceman – 6 (tied with Paul Coffey)

Awards and achievements
Preceded by Kailer Yamamoto	Edmonton Oilers first-round draft pick 2018	Succeeded by Philip Broberg
