= Gary Kurt =

Canadian ice hockey player

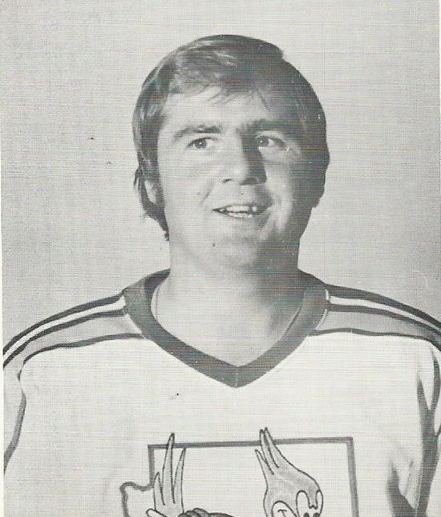
- Born: March 9, 1947 (age 79) Kitchener, Ontario, Canada
- Height: 6 ft 3 in (191 cm)
- Position: Goaltender
- Caught: Right
- Played for: California Golden Seals; New York Raiders; New York Golden Blades; Jersey Knights; Phoenix Roadrunners
- Playing career: 1969–1977

Gary David Kurt (born March 9, 1947, in Kitchener, Ontario) is a retired professional ice hockey goaltender.

== Playing career ==
Kurt played Junior hockey for the Ontario Hockey Association's Kitchener Rangers, at the time owned by the New York Rangers. Later he played two seasons for the Rangers' affiliate in the Central Hockey League, the Omaha Knights. After the 1968–69 season he was acquired by the Cleveland Barons of the American Hockey League.

After another two seasons in the AHL he broke into the NHL with the California Golden Seals, who acquired his rights from the Barons prior to the 1971–72 NHL season. He spent the first half of the season playing for the Golden Seals' affiliate Baltimore Clippers, but was called up to the Seals in January 1972 to replace Lyle Carter as Gilles Meloche's back-up. In February he was chosen by the new World Hockey Association's New York Raiders in their player draft. After completing his season with California he defected to the new league.

Kurt spent the following two seasons with the Raiders/Golden Blades/Jersey Knights franchise, backing-up Pete Donnelly and Joe Junkin, playing alongside former Seals Brian Perry, Bobby Sheehan, Kent Douglas, Mike Laughton and Norm Ferguson. He was chosen by the Phoenix Roadrunners in the 1974 WHA Expansion Draft, and finally given the chance to be starting goaltender for a major professional team.

His first season with the Roadrunners was his most successful professional one, winning 25 games and leading the Roadrunners to a playoff berth, but they were quickly dismissed by the Quebec Nordiques. He was named by the team as their most valuable player. The following season he shared goaltending duties with Jack Norris, and by 1976 he was once again relegated to being a back-up. At the end of the season he retired.

== Awards ==
- 1971 AHL First All-Star Team
- 1971 Harry "Hap" Holmes Memorial Award
- 1974 NAHL First All-Star Team

== Career statistics ==
=== Regular season and playoffs ===
			Regular season									Playoffs
Season	Team	League	GP	W	L	T	MIN	GA	SO	GAA	SV%	GP	W	L	MIN	GA	SO	GAA	SV%
1963–64	Kitchener Rangers	OHA	11	—	—	—	620	49	0	4.74	—	—	—	—	—	—	—	—	—
1964–65	Kitchener Rangers	OHA	21	—	—	—	1240	103	0	4.96	—	—	—	—	—	—	—	—	—
1965–66	Kitchener Rangers	OHA	9	—	—	—	540	33	1	3.67	—	17	—	—	1020	67	1	3.94	—
1966–67	Kitchener Rangers	OHA	16	—	—	—	940	69	0	4.40	—	—	—	—	—	—	—	—	—
1967–68	Omaha Knights	CHL	34	5	21	3	1842	124	0	4.04	—	—	—	—	—	—	—	—	—
1968–69	Omaha Knights	CHL	35	—	—	—	1940	108	1	3.34	—	3	1	0	104	5	0	2.88	—
1969–70	Cleveland Barons	AHL	40	—	—	—	2320	121	2	3.13	—	—	—	—	—	—	—	—	—
1970–71	Cleveland Barons	AHL	42	24	12	3	2263	101	3	2.67	—	7	4	3	420	20	0	2.85	—
1971–72	Baltimore Clippers	AHL	17	12	4	1	1020	47	1	2.76	—	—	—	—	—	—	—	—	—
1971–72	California Golden Seals	NHL	16	1	7	5	838	60	0	4.30	.856	—	—	—	—	—	—	—	—
1972–73	New York Raiders	WHA	38	10	21	0	1881	150	0	4.78	.855	—	—	—	—	—	—	—	—
1973–74	New York Golden Blades/Jersey Knights	WHA	20	8	10	0	1089	75	0	4.13	.867	—	—	—	—	—	—	—	—
1973–74	Syracuse Blazers	NAHL	24	—	—	—	1357	66	0	2.92	—	—	—	—	—	—	—	—	—
1974–75	Phoenix Roadrunners	WHA	47	25	16	4	2841	156	2	3.29	.885	4	1	2	207	12	0	3.48	—
1975–76	Phoenix Roadrunners	WHA	40	18	20	2	2369	147	1	3.72	.873	—	—	—	—	—	—	—	—
1976–77	Phoenix Roadrunners	WHA	33	11	19	1	1752	162	0	5.55	.838	—	—	—	—	—	—	—	—
1976–77	Oklahoma City Blazers	CHL	3	—	—	—	180	15	0	5.00	—	—	—	—	—	—	—	—	—
1978–79	Cambridge Hornets	OHA Sr	19	—	—	—	1140	86	0	4,53	—	—	—	—	—	—	—	—	—
WHA totals			176	72	86	7	9932	690	3	4.17	.865	4	1	2	207	12	0	3.48	—
NHL totals			16	1	7	5	838	60	0	4.30	.856	—	—	—	—	—	—	—	—
