= Steve Smith (ice hockey, born April 30, 1963) =

Canadian ice hockey player and coach

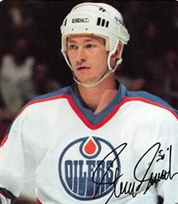
- Born: April 30, 1963 (age 63) Glasgow, Scotland
- Height: 6 ft 3 in (191 cm)
- Weight: 210 lb (95 kg; 15 st 0 lb)
- Position: Defence
- Shot: Left
- Played for: Edmonton Oilers; Chicago Blackhawks; Calgary Flames
- National team: Canada
- NHL draft: 111th overall, 1981; Edmonton Oilers
- Playing career: 1984–2000

James Stephen Smith (born April 30, 1963) is a Canadian former professional ice hockey defenceman and former assistant coach. He played in the National Hockey League (NHL) for sixteen seasons from 1984 to 2001. Smith won the Stanley Cup three times (1987, 1988, 1990) with the Edmonton Oilers and played in the 1991 All-Star Game and for the 1991 Canadian Team that won the Canada Cup in Toronto. In addition to the Oilers, Smith played for the Chicago Blackhawks and the Calgary Flames.

He coached as an assistant coach in the NHL from in two different stints from 1997 to 1998 and 2010 to 2021 for the Flames, Oilers, Carolina Hurricanes and the Buffalo Sabres. Smith coached for the Hartford Wolf Pack of the American Hockey League (AHL) starting in 2021 and was the interim head coach with the team in November 2023.

== Playing career ==
Smith played for the London Knights of the Ontario Hockey League from 1980–81 to 1982–83 before being drafted by the Edmonton Oilers in the 1981 NHL Entry Draft in the 6th round, 111th overall. He spent his first 2 years of professional hockey (1983–84 to 1984–85) playing for the Oilers minor league affiliate teams (Moncton and Halifax). He played with the Oilers starting in the 1984–85 season. He went on to play 804 career games scoring 375 points (72-303-375) along with 2,139 penalty minutes. Smith also played in 134 Stanley Cup Playoff games, scoring 52 points (11-41-52).

Smith played for the Oilers until the end of the 1990–91 season, winning three Stanley Cups with the team. Smith remains the Oilers' single-season leader in penalty minutes with 286, which he set during the 1987–88 season. He then played for the Chicago Blackhawks until 1997. He played in the 1991 All-Star Game in Chicago and later in the same year was part of the Canada Cup roster for Canada. He recorded an assist in eight games while recording 30 penalty minutes as Canada won over the United States. He initially retired after the end of the 1996–97 season. He served as an assistant coach to the Calgary Flames in 1997. He made a comeback in the autumn of 1998 to play for the Flames and was even named captain in 1999. His final game came against Minnesota on November 8, 2000 when he aggravated an injury to his spinal cord (having had spinal fusion surgery the previous season). He announced his retirement on December 7.

=== The "own goal" ===
Although Smith scored 83 goals in his NHL career (including 11 in the playoffs), he may be best known for a shot that went into his own net. On April 30, 1986, Smith's 23rd birthday, in the seventh game of the Smythe Division Final against the Calgary Flames, Calgary's Perry Berezan dumped the puck into the Edmonton zone before leaving the ice on a line change. Smith recovered the puck behind his net and intended to send it down the ice, only to accidentally bounce it off goaltender Grant Fuhr's skate and into his own net, giving the Flames a 3–2 lead (although he was already off the ice, Berezan was the last Flame to touch the puck and was thus credited with the goal: a rare instance of a hockey player "scoring" a goal while sitting on the bench). The top-seeded Oilers could not get the equalizer, and thus lost the game and were eliminated from the playoffs. Many fans blamed Smith for the loss, but in his autobiography Wayne Gretzky called that opinion "a total cop-out", asserting that the Oilers should have clinched the series well beforehand (as of 2023, Calgary and Edmonton have met in the Stanley Cup playoffs six times, and the 1986 tilt remains the Flames' only victory). When the Oilers recaptured the Stanley Cup in 1987, Smith was the first player to be handed the cup from Gretzky after receiving it from NHL President John Ziegler. Smith reflected upon the moment in later years, stating:

That moment taught me very quickly that you can be knocked off that pedestal really fast. I approach it now instead from a standpoint of how lucky we really are to be around this game and how quickly it can be taken away. I always think of it like the line from 'The Godfather': It was the business that we chose. If I didn't choose a business where I could possibly be exposed, then I would never have had the possibility of being exposed. It doesn't define you as a person. It doesn't define you as an athlete or competitor. You have to understand that there's a possibility that things could go wrong within a game, and they certainly did.

== Coaching career ==
Smith was an assistant coach with the Flames in 1997–98. He worked as a scout with the Chicago Blackhawks before spending four seasons on the Oilers coaching staff from 2010 to 2014. He was hired as an assistant coach of the Hurricanes in June 2014, and then as the assistant coach of the Sabres in July 2018. Smith, along with head coach Ralph Krueger were relieved of their duties by the Sabres on March 17, 2021. He was then hired by the New York Rangers minor league affiliate team the Hartford Wolf Pack as an assistant coach and was named their interim head coach when Kris Knoblauch was hired to be the Edmonton Oilers' head coach.

== Personal life ==
Smith was born in Glasgow, Scotland, United Kingdom, but grew up in Cobourg, Ontario and has two brothers, David and Ian.

He is married and has five children. His son, Barron Smith (born April 2, 1991), was selected by the Toronto Maple Leafs in the 7th round of the 2009 NHL entry draft.

== Awards ==
- 1986–87 – NHL – Stanley Cup (Edmonton)
- 1987–88 – NHL – Stanley Cup (Edmonton)
- 1989–90 – NHL – Stanley Cup (Edmonton)

== Career statistics ==
=== Regular season and playoffs ===
			Regular season					Playoffs
Season	Team	League	GP	G	A	Pts	PIM	GP	G	A	Pts	PIM
1980–81	London Knights	OHL	62	4	12	16	141	—	—	—	—	—
1981–82	London Knights	OHL	58	10	36	46	207	4	1	2	3	13
1982–83	London Knights	OHL	50	6	35	41	133	3	1	0	1	10
1982–83	Moncton Alpines	AHL	2	0	0	0	0	—	—	—	—	—
1983–84	Moncton Alpines	AHL	64	1	8	9	176	—	—	—	—	—
1984–85	Edmonton Oilers	NHL	2	0	0	0	2	—	—	—	—	—
1984–85	Nova Scotia Oilers	AHL	68	2	28	30	161	5	0	3	3	40
1985–86	Nova Scotia Oilers	AHL	4	0	2	2	11	—	—	—	—	—
1985–86	Edmonton Oilers	NHL	55	4	20	24	166	6	0	1	1	14
1986–87	Edmonton Oilers	NHL	62	7	15	22	165	15	1	3	4	45
1987–88	Edmonton Oilers	NHL	79	12	43	55	286	19	1	11	12	55
1988–89	Edmonton Oilers	NHL	35	3	19	22	97	7	2	2	4	20
1989–90	Edmonton Oilers	NHL	75	7	34	41	171	22	5	10	15	37
1990–91	Edmonton Oilers	NHL	77	13	41	54	193	18	1	2	3	45
1991–92	Chicago Blackhawks	NHL	76	9	21	30	304	18	1	11	12	16
1992–93	Chicago Blackhawks	NHL	78	10	47	57	214	4	0	0	0	10
1993–94	Chicago Blackhawks	NHL	57	5	22	27	174	—	—	—	—	—
1994–95	Chicago Blackhawks	NHL	48	1	12	13	128	16	0	1	1	26
1995–96	Chicago Blackhawks	NHL	37	0	9	9	71	6	0	0	0	16
1996–97	Chicago Blackhawks	NHL	21	0	0	0	29	3	0	0	0	4
1998–99	Calgary Flames	NHL	69	1	14	15	80	—	—	—	—	—
1999–2000	Calgary Flames	NHL	20	0	4	4	42	—	—	—	—	—
2000–01	Calgary Flames	NHL	13	0	2	2	17	—	—	—	—	—
NHL totals			804	72	303	375	2,139	134	11	41	52	288

=== International ===
Year	Team	Event	GP	G	A	Pts	PIM
1991	Canada	CC	8	0	1	1	30
Senior totals			8	0	1	1	30

== See also ==
- List of National Hockey League players born in the United Kingdom
- List of NHL players with 2,000 career penalty minutes

Preceded by Todd Simpson	Calgary Flames captain 1999–2000	Succeeded by Dave Lowry
