= Risto Siltanen =

Finnish ice hockey player

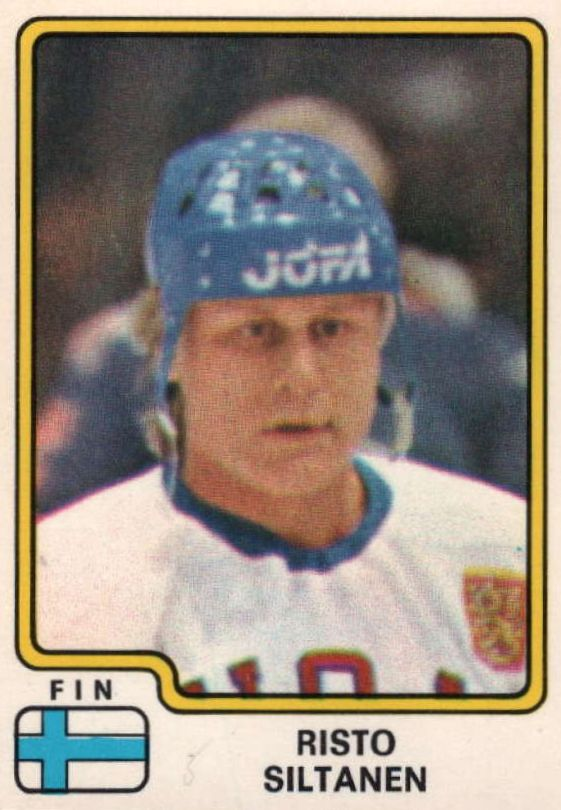
- Born: 31 October 1958 (age 67) Mänttä, Finland
- Height: 5 ft 7 in (170 cm)
- Weight: 190 lb (86 kg; 13 st 8 lb)
- Position: Defence
- Shot: Right
- Played for: Ilves; Edmonton Oilers; Hartford Whalers; Quebec Nordiques; SC Bern; TuTo
- NHL draft: 173rd overall, 1978; St. Louis Blues
- Playing career: 1976–1997

Risto Siltanen (born 31 October 1958) is a Finnish former professional ice hockey defenceman. He played eight seasons in the National Hockey League for the Edmonton Oilers, Hartford Whalers and Quebec Nordiques.

== Career statistics ==
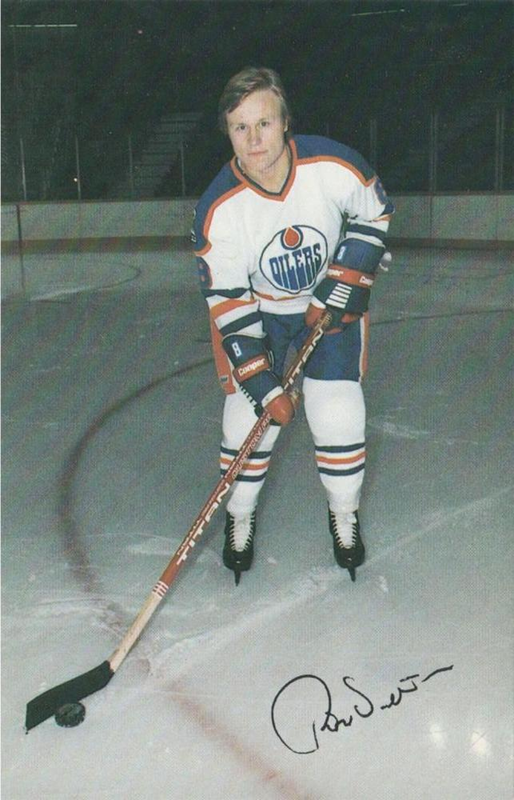
Siltanen in 1979 postcard for Edmonton Oilers

=== Regular season and playoffs ===
			Regular season					Playoffs
Season	Team	League	GP	G	A	Pts	PIM	GP	G	A	Pts	PIM
1975–76	Ilves	FIN U20	35	39	17	56	40	—	—	—	—	—
1976–77	Ilves	SM-l	36	10	7	17	28	—	—	—	—	—
1977–78	Ilves	SM-l	36	7	8	15	42	7	1	1	2	10
1978–79	Ilves	SM-l	34	13	8	21	44	—	—	—	—	—
1978–79	Edmonton Oilers	WHA	20	3	4	7	4	11	0	9	9	4
1979–80	Edmonton Oilers	NHL	64	6	29	35	26	2	0	0	0	2
1980–81	Edmonton Oilers	NHL	79	17	36	53	54	9	2	0	2	8
1981–82	Edmonton Oilers	NHL	63	15	48	63	26	5	3	2	5	10
1982–83	Hartford Whalers	NHL	74	5	25	30	28	—	—	—	—	—
1983–84	Hartford Whalers	NHL	75	15	38	53	34	—	—	—	—	—
1984–85	Hartford Whalers	NHL	76	12	33	45	30	—	—	—	—	—
1985–86	Hartford Whalers	NHL	52	8	22	30	30	—	—	—	—	—
1985–86	Quebec Nordiques	NHL	13	2	5	7	6	3	0	1	1	2
1986–87	Fredericton Express	AHL	6	2	4	6	6	—	—	—	—	—
1986–87	Quebec Nordiques	NHL	66	10	29	39	32	13	1	9	10	8
1987–88	SC Bern	NDA	35	13	13	26	34	—	—	—	—	—
1988–89	Ilves	SM-l	43	19	20	39	32	5	2	1	3	6
1989–90	Ilves	SM-l	44	16	17	33	40	8	2	5	7	10
1990–91	Ilves	SM-l	37	11	13	24	32	—	—	—	—	—
1991–92	Ilves	SM-l	44	4	9	13	22	—	—	—	—	—
1992–93	TuTo	FIN.2	49	17	21	38	118	—	—	—	—	—
1993–94	TuTo	FIN.2	51	13	24	37	46	—	—	—	—	—
1994–95	TuTo	SM-l	44	10	14	24	52	—	—	—	—	—
1995–96	TuTo	SM-l	45	6	6	12	44	—	—	—	—	—
1996–97	SC Bietigheim-Bissingen	DEU.3	49	13	35	48	28	—	—	—	—	—
SM-l totals			363	96	102	198	336	20	5	7	12	26
WHA totals			20	3	4	7	4	11	0	9	9	4
NHL totals			562	90	265	355	266	32	6	12	18	30

=== International ===
Medal record

Representing Finland

Men's ice hockey

European Junior Championships
Bronze medal – third place	1976 Czechoslovakia	

Year	Team	Event	GP	G	A	Pts	PIM
1976	Finland	EJC	4	3	0	3	0
1977	Finland	WJC	7	5	1	6	8
1977	Finland	WC	10	1	0	1	6
1978	Finland	WJC	4	0	3	3	4
1978	Finland	WC	10	0	3	3	6
1981	Finland	CC	5	1	1	2	6
1983	Finland	WC	6	0	1	1	8
Junior totals			15	8	4	12	12
Senior totals			31	2	5	7	24

== Awards and honors ==
- All-Star Selection, 1977 and 1978 IIHF world junior hockey championships
