= Charlie Huddy =

Canadian ice hockey player

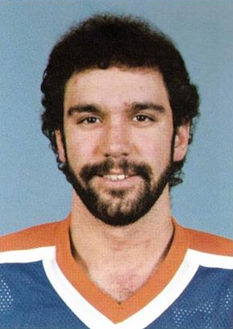
- Born: June 2, 1959 (age 66) Oshawa, Ontario, Canada
- Height: 6 ft 0 in (183 cm)
- Weight: 200 lb (91 kg; 14 st 4 lb)
- Position: Defence
- Shot: Left
- Played for: Edmonton Oilers; Los Angeles Kings; Buffalo Sabres; St. Louis Blues
- National team: Canada
- NHL draft: Undrafted
- Playing career: 1979–1997

Charles William Huddy (born June 2, 1959) is a Canadian former NHL defenceman and former assistant coach of the Winnipeg Jets. He is also one of only seven Edmonton Oilers to be a member of all 5 of the franchise's Stanley Cup-winning teams (1984, 1985, 1987, 1988 & 1990).

== Biography ==
As a youth, he played in the 1972 Quebec International Pee-Wee Hockey Tournament with a minor ice hockey team from Dorset Park, Toronto.

His greatest success came with the Oilers, with whom he played from the start of his career in the 1980–81 season until the end of the 1990–91 season. He would tally 368 points in 694 regular-season games and 77 points in 138 playoff games. In 1983, Huddy won the NHL's first Plus/Minus Award, presented annually to the player who (in at least sixty games) leads the NHL in Plus/Minus statistics.

After he left Edmonton, Huddy would play four seasons with the Los Angeles Kings, which included former Oilers, Wayne Gretzky, Jari Kurri, Marty McSorley, and Paul Coffey. He played an important role in LA's march to the 1993 Stanley Cup Final. Huddy would later finish his career with the St. Louis Blues and Buffalo Sabres, eventually retiring after the 1996–97 campaign.

He previously held an assistant coaching position with the New York Rangers and was the head coach of the ECHL Huntington Blizzard. Charlie was relieved of his duties for the Edmonton Oilers as an assistant coach with the personnel changes that took place on May 26, 2009. He was subsequently an assistant coach with the Dallas Stars but was let go on June 24, 2011. Huddy was hired as the new assistant coach of the Winnipeg Jets on July 8, 2011. Huddy's time as an assistant coach with the Jets came to an end after the 2021-22 season.

== Awards and achievements ==
- 1982-83 - NHL Plus/Minus Award

Stanley Cup

- 1983–84, 1984–85, 1986–87, 1987–88, 1989–90

== Career statistics ==
=== Regular season and playoffs ===
			Regular season					Playoffs
Season	Team	League	GP	G	A	Pts	PIM	GP	G	A	Pts	PIM
1976–77	Markham Waxers	OPJHL	48	14	20	34	80	—	—	—	—	—
1977–78	Oshawa Generals	OMJHL	59	17	18	35	81	6	2	1	3	10
1978–79	Oshawa Generals	OMJHL	64	20	38	58	108	5	3	4	7	12
1979–80	Houston Apollos	CHL	79	14	34	48	46	6	1	0	1	2
1980–81	Edmonton Oilers	NHL	12	2	5	7	6	—	—	—	—	—
1980–81	Wichita Wind	CHL	47	8	36	44	71	17	3	11	14	10
1981–82	Edmonton Oilers	NHL	41	4	11	15	46	5	1	2	3	14
1982–83	Edmonton Oilers	NHL	76	20	37	57	58	15	1	6	7	10
1983–84	Edmonton Oilers	NHL	75	8	34	42	43	12	1	9	10	8
1984–85	Edmonton Oilers	NHL	80	7	44	51	46	18	3	17	20	17
1985–86	Edmonton Oilers	NHL	76	6	35	41	55	7	0	2	2	0
1986–87	Edmonton Oilers	NHL	58	4	15	19	35	21	1	7	8	21
1987–88	Edmonton Oilers	NHL	77	13	28	41	71	13	4	5	9	10
1988–89	Edmonton Oilers	NHL	76	11	33	44	52	7	2	0	2	4
1989–90	Edmonton Oilers	NHL	70	1	23	24	56	22	0	6	6	10
1990–91	Edmonton Oilers	NHL	53	5	22	27	32	18	3	7	10	10
1991–92	Los Angeles Kings	NHL	56	4	19	23	43	6	1	1	2	10
1992–93	Los Angeles Kings	NHL	82	2	25	27	64	23	1	4	5	12
1993–94	Los Angeles Kings	NHL	79	5	13	18	71	—	—	—	—	—
1994–95	Los Angeles Kings	NHL	9	0	1	1	6	—	—	—	—	—
1994–95	Buffalo Sabres	NHL	32	2	4	6	36	3	0	0	0	0
1995–96	Buffalo Sabres	NHL	52	5	5	10	59	—	—	—	—	—
1995–96	St. Louis Blues	NHL	12	0	0	0	6	13	1	0	1	8
1996–97	Buffalo Sabres	NHL	1	0	0	0	0	—	—	—	—	—
1996–97	Rochester Americans	AHL	63	6	8	14	36	4	0	0	0	0
NHL totals			1,017	99	354	453	785	183	19	66	85	134

=== International ===
Year	Team	Event	GP	G	A	Pts	PIM
1984	Canada	CC	7	0	2	2	2

== See also ==
- List of NHL players with 1,000 games played

Preceded by first winner	Winner of the NHL Plus/Minus Award; 1983	Succeeded by Wayne Gretzky
