= Allan Globensky =

Canadian ice hockey player

- Born: April 17, 1951 (age 75) Montreal, Quebec, Canada
- Height: 6 ft 1 in (185 cm)
- Weight: 201 lb (91 kg; 14 st 5 lb)
- Position: Defence
- Shot: Right
- Played for: Quebec Nordiques (WHA); Lukko
- NHL draft: 77th overall, 1971; Minnesota North Stars
- Playing career: 1971–1979

Allan Alexander Globensky (born April 17, 1951) is a Canadian former professional ice hockey player who played in the World Hockey Association (WHA). Globensky played parts of three WHA seasons with the Quebec Nordiques. He was selected in the sixth round of the 1971 NHL Amateur Draft by the Minnesota North Stars.

Globensky has long been an outspoken critic of fighting in hockey. His book, A Little Knock Won't Hurt Ya: My Life as a Hockey Enforcer, written with Rob Kennedy and Terry Scott, details the impact fighting had on Allan's life and health. It was released in October 2019.

== Career statistics ==
			Regular season					Playoffs
Season	Team	League	GP	G	A	Pts	PIM	GP	G	A	Pts	PIM
1969–70	Montreal Junior Canadiens	OHA-Jr.	53	0	6	6	181	—	—	—	—	—
1970–71	Montreal Junior Canadiens	OHA-Jr.	48	3	16	19	219	—	—	—	—	—
1971–72	Muskegon Mohawks	IHL	32	0	3	3	33	—	—	—	—	—
1971–72	Port Huron Icehawks	IHL	10	0	4	4	4	—	—	—	—	—
1972–73	Quebec Nordiques	WHA	3	0	0	0	0	—	—	—	—	—
1972–73	Rhode Island Eagles	EHL-Sr.	4	0	0	0	0	—	—	—	—	—
1973–74	Maine Nordiques	NAHL-Sr.	45	4	17	21	110	8	0	3	3	5
1974–75	Maine Nordiques	NAHL-Sr.	39	7	8	15	42	—	—	—	—	—
1974–75	Quebec Nordiques	WHA	5	0	0	0	5	2	1	0	1	0
1975–76	Quebec Nordiques	WHA	34	1	2	3	13	—	—	—	—	—
1975–76	Maine Nordiques	NAHL-Sr.	14	2	5	7	26	1	0	0	0	0
1976–77	Maine Nordiques	NAHL-Sr.	70	7	21	28	78	12	0	9	9	16
1977–78	Lukko	Liiga	36	0	1	1	43	—	—	—	—	—
1977–78	Binghamton Dusters	AHL	12	2	1	3	2	—	—	—	—	—
1978–79	Binghamton Dusters	AHL	5	0	0	0	0	—	—	—	—	—
1978–79	Cape Cod Codders	NEHL	7	0	1	1	27	—	—	—	—	—
WHA totals			42	1	2	3	18	2	1	0	1	0
