= Gregg Pilling =

Canadian ice hockey player and coach (born 1943)

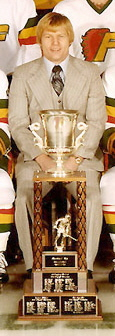
- Pilling and the Lockhart Cup in 1976
- Born: September 25, 1943 (age 83) Lethbridge, Alberta, Canada
- Height: 5 ft 10 in (178 cm)
- Weight: 180 lb (82 kg; 12 st 12 lb)
- Position: Right wing
- Shot: Right
- Played for: Memphis Wings; Buffalo Bisons; Omaha Knights; Charlotte Checkers; Suncoast Suns; Roanoke Valley Rebels; Philadelphia Firebirds
- Coached for: Roanoke Valley Rebels; Philadelphia Firebirds; Fort Wayne Komets; Regina Pats; Toledo Goaldiggers; Sherwood Park Crusaders
- Playing career: 1964–1976
- Coaching career: 1972–1981

Gregg Pilling (born September 25, 1943) is a Canadian former professional ice hockey player and coach. He was named coach of the year by the International Hockey League in 1977–78 season, after he led the Fort Wayne Komets to the Fred A. Huber Trophy as the regular season champions. He also won coach of the year awards in Southern Hockey League, and North American Hockey League, while guiding the Roanoke Valley Rebels and the Philadelphia Firebirds to league championships. Pilling made headlines as a coach for his colourful in-game protests and multiple ejections. Prior to coaching, he had a brief playing career, including a 1963 Memorial Cup championship with the Edmonton Oil Kings, and was voted the most valuable player in his final full season as a player.

== Playing career ==
Gregg Pilling was born on September 25, 1943, in Lethbridge, Alberta. He began his playing career with the Lethbridge Native Sons, and then played in the Big 6 Hockey League, before joining the Edmonton Oil Kings. He was a member of the 1963 Memorial Cup champion Edmonton team coached by Russ Brayshaw, that included future NHL coaches Glen Sather, Pat Quinn, and Bert Marshall. Pilling admits that he had a reputation as a vicious junior player. He was also described as hard, tough, fiery, and creating fireworks on ice.

Pilling began playing professional hockey when he signed with Detroit Red Wings organization, and was assigned to the Memphis Wings. He later played with the Buffalo Bisons, and the Omaha Knights, before returning to Alberta after four seasons. He then played two seasons in the Alberta Senior Hockey League, one each with Medicine Hat Blades, followed by the Drumheller Miners. He earned the nickname Zorro in senior hockey due to his reputation for stickwork.

Pilling moved up to the Eastern Hockey League in 1970–71, playing with the Charlotte Checkers. He scored 25 goals, 63 points, and earned 142 penalty minutes, for the regular season Walker Cup champions. Charlotte were also playoff champions, winning the Atlantic City Boardwalk Trophy. He briefly spent time coaching in Switzerland, then returned to play with the Suncoast Suns for the 1971–72 season. Pilling was named the team's first captain, and received the most valuable player award from the Charlotte Observer, as voted by members of opposing teams.

== Coaching career ==
Pilling began his full-time coaching career at age 28, when offered a one-year contract with the Roanoke Valley Rebels for the 1972–73 season. He played eight games during the season, and led the Rebels to 40 wins, and a first-place finish in the south division. Roanoke reached the playoff finals, but lost to the Syracuse Blazers. Roanoke switched to the Southern Hockey League for the 1973–74 season, and Pilling stayed with the team. The team's roster that season included eleven French Canadians, and a young Mike Keenan. The Rebels finished first place in the regular season with 53 wins. In the playoffs, Pilling's team trailed 3 games to 1 versus the Winston-Salem Polar Twins, but rallied to win the series in seven games, then defeated the Charlotte Checkers in seven games to win the Crockett Cup. Pilling was named the SHL Coach of the Year. He resigned on July 29, 1974.

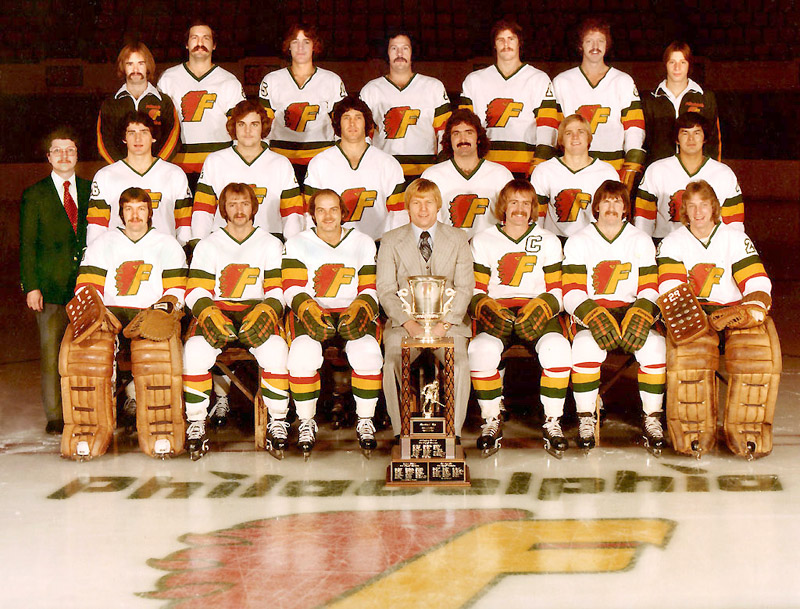
Coach Gregg Pilling in the middle of the front row, with the 1976–77 Philadelphia Firebirds, and the 1976 Lockhart Cup

Pilling was named the coach and general manager of Philadelphia's expansion team in the North American Hockey League. The Philadelphia Firebirds were announced in August 1974, resulting from a name-the-team contest. During the 1974–75 NAHL season, Pilling was fined $1000, and suspended five games due to forfeiting a game by pulling his team off the ice when a referee refused to allow a warm-up for the substitute goaltender, when the starter was injured. Pilling led the Firebirds to forty wins, and second place during the regular season. His team faced the seventh place Long Island Cougars in the first round of the playoffs, but were upset in four games. Pilling was named NAHL coach of the year, his second such award in two seasons. He was considered for Edmonton Oilers coaching vacancy in 1975. In the 1975–76 NAHL season, Piling led the Firebirds to 45 wins, and a second-place finished in the west division. He even played one game that year, accumulating 17 penalty minutes. In the playoffs, Pilling led Philadelphia past the Mohawk Valley Comets three games to one, then defeated the defending champion Johnstown Jets four games to one to reach the finals. Pilling won his second playoffs championship as a coach, as Philadelphia captured the Lockhart Cup in six games over the Beauce Jaros. He was named the league's general manager of the year. In the 1976–77 NAHL season, Pilling led the Firebirds to 38 wins, and fourth overall in the league. He made headlines by wearing an army helmet on the bench in protest of player helmets being mandatory. He later served a five-game suspension in January for waving a towel at a referee. Philadelphia faced the fifth place Erie Blades in the first round of the playoffs, and lost the series in five games.

After the season, Pilling was interviewed for the Maine Mariners coaching position in the American Hockey League, but later signed with the Fort Wayne Komets in the International Hockey League. He led the Komets to 40 wins, and 97 points, and a first overall finish in the 1977–78 IHL season, winning the Fred A. Huber Trophy. In the playoffs, the Komets won the first round against the Muskegon Mohawks in six games, but faltered in round two in five games, losing to the Toledo Goaldiggers. Pilling was named the IHL's first-team all-star coach, equivalent to coach of the year, prior to the introduction of the Commissioner's Trophy. It was Pilling's third coach of the year award in the last five seasons. He resigned on June 2, 1978, and was the preferred choice to become head coach of the Indianapolis Racers, but a contract was not finalized due to NHL–WHA merger talks.

Pilling was named the new coach and general manager of the Regina Pats, receiving a one-year contract in June. He accepted the job in Regina over other offers, since he preferred to have both positions, not just one. Later in July, he was given a raise by Regina when Indianapolis expressed further interest in Pilling. The season did not go as planned for Pilling, as the Pats struggled near the bottom of the standings, and his frustrations manifested into numerous ejections. During a game on October 22, Pilling was assessed three minor penalties while protesting decisions of the referee, and later received a gross misconduct when he began the third period by putting himself into the penalty box to serve the bench minor that he was assessed, instead of a player. He was later fined $1,000 for "complete disrespect and irresponsible actions", and the club had to put up a $1,000 bond against further actions. When the 1978–79 WHL season was completed, Regina won 18 games, earned 43 points, and finished second last in the league, out of the playoffs. Pilling was not retained for the next season after the team changed ownership.

Pilling served as an interim coach for the Toledo Goaldiggers, after coach Ted Garvin had a heart attack in the offseason. The team was sold partway through the season, and Pilling was retained until the end of the playoffs. In the 1979–80 IHL season, Toledo earned 28 wins, 74 points, and second place in the south division. In the playoffs, they lost in four games to Fort Wayne. Pilling was named coach of Sherwood Park Crusaders in the Alberta Junior Hockey League, when Dennis Smith resigned. His team won 36 out of 60 games, finished first place in the south division, and lost in the second round of the playoffs.

== Personal life ==
Pilling has been involved with running hockey schools in Medicine Hat and Lethbridge. He has done fundraising for Kin Canada Christmas programs. As a member of the 1962–63 Oil Kings, he was honoured by Hockey Alberta with an induction into the Alberta Hockey Hall of Fame. As a member of the 1962–63 Oil Kings, he was inducted into the Alberta Sports Hall of Fame in 2011. Pilling is an organizer of the Oil Kings alumni association.

== Playing statistics ==
Season-by-season career playing statistics.

			Regular Season					Playoffs
Season	Team	League	GP	G	A	Pts	PIM	GP	G	A	Pts	PIM
1962–63	Edmonton Oil Kings	CAHL	–	–	–	–	–	–	–	–	–	–
1963–64	Edmonton Oil Kings	CAHL	–	–	–	–	–	–	–	–	–	–
1964–65	Memphis Wings	CPHL	23	4	4	8	31	–	–	–	–	–
1965–66	Memphis Wings	CPHL	68	4	12	16	80	–	–	–	–	–
1966–67	Buffalo Bisons	AHL	40	2	8	10	22	–	–	–	–	–
1967–68	Omaha Knights	CPHL	10	3	1	4	27	–	–	–	–	–
1967–68	Buffalo Bisons	AHL	44	2	3	5	4	1	0	0	0	0
1968–69	Medicine Hat Blades	ASHL	–	–	–	–	–	–	–	–	–	–
1969–70	Drumheller Miners	ASHL	–	–	–	–	–	–	–	–	–	–
1970–71	Charlotte Checkers	EHL	72	25	38	63	142	13	4	6	10	23
1971–72	Suncoast Suns	EHL	60	24	28	52	124	6	0	0	0	10
1972–73	Roanoke Valley Rebels	EHL	8	1	2	3	18	–	–	–	–	–
1975–76	Philadelphia Firebirds	NAHL	1	0	0	0	17	–	–	–	–	–
CPHL Totals			101	11	17	28	138	–	–	–	–	–
AHL Totals			84	4	11	15	26	1	0	0	0	0
EHL Totals			140	50	68	118	284	19	4	6	10	33

== Coaching record ==
Season-by-season career coaching record.

Season	Team	League	GP	W	L	T	Pts	Pct %	Standing	Playoffs
1972–73	Roanoke Valley Rebels	EHL	76	40	25	11	91	0.599	1st, south	Lost in finals
1973–74	Roanoke Valley Rebels	SHL	72	53	19	0	106	0.736	1st, SHL	Won championship
1974–75	Philadelphia Firebirds	NAHL	74	40	31	3	83	0.561	2nd, NAHL	Lost in round 1
1975–76	Philadelphia Firebirds	NAHL	74	45	29	0	90	0.608	2nd, west	Won championship
1976–77	Philadelphia Firebirds	NAHL	74	38	33	3	79	0.534	4th, NAHL	Lost in round 1
1977–78	Fort Wayne Komets	IHL	80	40	23	17	97	0.606	1st, south	Lost in round 2
1978–79	Regina Pats	WHL	72	18	47	7	43	0.299	4th, east	Out of playoffs
1979–80	Toledo Goaldiggers	IHL	80	28	34	18	74	0.463	2nd, south	Lost in round 1
1980–81	Sherwood Park Crusaders	AJHL	60	36	23	1	73	0.608	1st, south	Lost in round 2
TOTALS			662	338	264	60	736	0.556	4 titles	2 championships
