= Dave Walter (ice hockey) =

Canadian ice hockey player

- Born: May 6, 1952 (age 73) Niagara Falls, Ontario, Canada
- Height: 6 ft 0 in (183 cm)
- Weight: 185 lb (84 kg; 13 st 3 lb)
- Position: Centre
- Shot: Left
- Played for: WHA; Chicago Cougars; San Diego Mariners; EHL; Rhode Island Eagles; Utica Mohawks; Hampton Aces; NAHL; Long Island Cougars; Binghamton Dusters; CHL; Tucson Mavericks
- NHL draft: Undrafted
- Playing career: 1972–1981

David George Walter (born May 6, 1952) is a Canadian former professional ice hockey centre. Between 1973 and 1976, Walter played 26 games in the World Hockey Association with the Chicago Cougars and San Diego Mariners.

== Career statistics ==
			Regular season					Playoffs
Season	Team	League	GP	G	A	Pts	PIM	GP	G	A	Pts	PIM
1969–70	Niagara Falls Flyers	OHA-Jr.	1	0	0	0	0	—	—	—	—	—
1970–71	Welland Sabres	SOJHL	36	22	23	45	75	—	—	—	—	—
1971–72	Welland Sabres	SOJHL	56	62	56	118	0	—	—	—	—	—
1972–73	Rhode Island Eagles	EHL-Sr.	76	57	57	114	38	4	1	1	2	0
1973–74	Long Island Cougars	NAHL-Sr.	44	28	34	62	47	—	—	—	—	—
1973–74	Chicago Cougars	WHA	4	0	1	1	0	—	—	—	—	—
1974–75	Long Island Cougars	NAHL-Sr.	62	38	42	80	75	—	—	—	—	—
1974–75	Chicago Cougars	WHA	6	1	0	1	2	—	—	—	—	—
1975–76	Tucson Mavericks	CHL	47	17	16	33	54	—	—	—	—	—
1975–76	San Diego Mariners	WHA	16	1	2	3	6	—	—	—	—	—
1976–77	Broome Dusters	NAHL-Sr.	64	20	25	45	28	10	4	8	12	2
1977–78	Brantford Alexanders	OHA-Sr.	40	35	34	69	15	—	—	—	—	—
1978–79	Welland Steelers	OHA-Sr.	—	—	—	—	—	—	—	—	—	—
1979–80	Utica Mohawks	EHL-Pro	4	2	5	7	2	—	—	—	—	—
1980–81	Hampton Aces	EHL-Pro	56	25	38	63	29	—	—	—	—	—
WHA totals			26	2	3	5	8	—	—	—	—	—
