= John Stewart (ice hockey, born 1954) =

Canadian ice hockey player

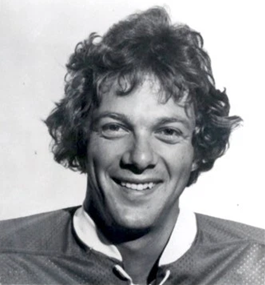
- Stewart in 1978 photo
- Born: January 2, 1954 (age 72) Toronto, Ontario, Canada
- Height: 5 ft 11 in (180 cm)
- Weight: 170 lb (77 kg; 12 st 2 lb)
- Position: Centre
- Shot: Left
- Played for: Cleveland Crusaders; Birmingham Bulls; Quebec Nordiques; Berliner SC
- NHL draft: 105th overall, 1974; Montreal Canadiens
- WHA draft: 25th overall, 1974; Cleveland Crusaders
- Playing career: 1974–1982

See also John Stewart (ice hockey, born 1950)

John Christopher Stewart (born January 2, 1954) is a Canadian retired professional ice hockey player. He played 271 games in the World Hockey Association and 2 games in the National Hockey League from 1974 to 1979.

== Career ==
As a youth, he played in the 1966 Quebec International Pee-Wee Hockey Tournament with the Toronto Red Wings minor ice hockey team. During his professional career, Stewart played for the Quebec Nordiques, Birmingham Bulls, and Cleveland Crusaders.

== Career statistics ==
=== Regular season and playoffs ===
| | | | Regular season | | | | | Playoffs |
| Season | Team | League | GP | G | A | Pts | PIM | GP | G | A | Pts | PIM |
|---|---|---|---|---|---|---|---|---|---|---|---|---|
| 1971–72 | Markham Waxers | MetJBHL | 38 | 25 | 55 | 80 | 43 | — | — | — | — | — |
| 1972–73 | Bowling Green State University | CCHA | 35 | 20 | 31 | 51 | 26 | — | — | — | — | — |
| 1973–74 | Bowling Green State University | CCHA | 39 | 27 | 43 | 70 | 50 | — | — | — | — | — |
| 1974–75 | Cleveland Crusaders | WHA | 59 | 4 | 7 | 11 | 8 | 1 | 0 | 0 | 0 | 0 |
| 1974–75 | Cape Codders | NAHL | 13 | 5 | 11 | 16 | 14 | — | — | — | — | — |
| 1975–76 | Cleveland Crusaders | WHA | 42 | 2 | 9 | 11 | 15 | — | — | — | — | — |
| 1975–76 | Syracuse Blazers | NAHL | 23 | 11 | 17 | 28 | 29 | 8 | 2 | 8 | 10 | 21 |
| 1976–77 | Birmingham Bulls | WHA | 52 | 17 | 24 | 41 | 33 | — | — | — | — | — |
| 1976–77 | Syracuse Blazers | NAHL | 18 | 18 | 36 | 54 | 4 | — | — | — | — | — |
| 1977–78 | Birmingham Bulls | WHA | 48 | 13 | 26 | 39 | 52 | 5 | 1 | 1 | 2 | 6 |
| 1977–78 | Philadelphia Firebirds | AHL | 24 | 11 | 13 | 24 | 44 | — | — | — | — | — |
| 1978–79 | Birmingham Bulls | WHA | 71 | 24 | 26 | 50 | 108 | — | — | — | — | — |
| 1979–80 | Quebec Nordiques | NHL | 2 | 0 | 0 | 0 | 0 | — | — | — | — | — |
| 1979–80 | Syracuse Firebirds | AHL | 71 | 28 | 40 | 68 | 59 | 2 | 0 | 0 | 0 | 0 |
| 1980–81 | Birmingham Bulls | CHL | 57 | 22 | 33 | 55 | 57 | — | — | — | — | — |
| 1980–81 | Binghamton Whalers | AHL | 18 | 10 | 10 | 20 | 29 | 6 | 4 | 2 | 6 | 2 |
| 1981–82 | Berliner SC | GER | 35 | 12 | 17 | 29 | 46 | — | — | — | — | — |
| WHA totals | | | 272 | 60 | 92 | 152 | 216 | 6 | 1 | 1 | 2 | 6 |
| NHL totals | | | 2 | 0 | 0 | 0 | 0 | — | — | — | — | — |

== Awards and honours ==
| Award | Year |
|---|---|
| CCHA All-Tournament Team | 1973 |
| All-CCHA Second Team | 1973–74 |
