= Randy MacGregor =

- Born: July 9, 1953 (age 71); London, Ontario, Canada
- Height: 5 ft 9 in (175 cm)
- Weight: 175 lb (79 kg; 12 st 7 lb)
- Position: Right wing
- Shot: Left
- Played for: Hartford Whalers
- NHL draft: Undrafted
- Playing career: 1973–1984

Randy Kenneth MacGregor (born July 9, 1953) is a former professional ice hockey player. MacGregor played Junior Hockey in Ontario, before going pro with the Broome Dusters (Binghamton, NY) of the North American Hockey League in 1973. He skated much of his professional career in Binghamton.

MacGregor would make the transition with the Dusters in 1977 into the American Hockey League. The Dusters became the Whalers in 1980 and MacGregor would spend part of the 1980–81 season in Klagenfurt, Austria. He would return to Binghamton later that season, but would end his career in 1984 in Glens Falls, NY with the Adirondack Red Wings.

Following his playing days, MacGregor returned to his adopted hometown of Binghamton. He is a contractor and has been a hockey coach with the Southern Tier Hockey Association and Syracuse Stars minor hockey systems. MacGregor continues to reside in the area; now calling Vestal home. He has two adult sons Justin and Dillon.

== Awards ==
In 1984, MacGregor's #11 became the only jersey in Binghamton Hockey History to be retired to the rafters. (It was unretired by the Rangers' organization in 1991)

In 1998, MacGregor was the first player inducted into the Binghamton Hockey Hall of Fame. Also part of the Hall of Fame's inaugural class was Broome Dusters' founder Jim Matthews and Detroit Red Wings General Manager Ken Holland, who spent much of his playing career in Binghamton.

== Career statistics ==
=== Regular season and playoffs ===
			Regular season					Playoffs
Season	Team	League	GP	G	A	Pts	PIM	GP	G	A	Pts	PIM
1971–72	Chatham Maroons	SOJHL	56	18	25	43	216	—	—	—	—	—
1972–73	Chatham Maroons	SOJHL	58	36	20	56	176	—	—	—	—	—
1973–74	Broome Dusters	NAHL	73	16	28	44	137	—	—	—	—	—
1974–75	Broome Dusters	NAHL	73	23	48	71	154	15	2	7	9	49
1975–76	Broome Dusters	NAHL	43	9	10	19	84	—	—	—	—	—
1976–77	Broome Dusters	NAHL	71	21	26	47	128	6	2	4	6	31
1976–77	Muskegon Mohawks	IHL	—	—	—	—	—	3	0	0	0	5
1977–78	Binghamton Dusters	AHL	78	20	29	49	117	—	—	—	—	—
1978–79	Binghamton Dusters	AHL	64	29	46	75	113	—	—	—	—	—
1979–80	Binghamton Dusters	AHL	71	21	23	44	164	—	—	—	—	—
1980–81	Binghamton Whalers	AHL	28	14	9	23	49	5	2	0	2	20
1980–81	EC KAC	AUT	23	8	11	19	66	—	—	—	—	—
1981–82	Binghamton Whalers	AHL	71	23	50	73	115	15	6	7	13	49
1981–82	Hartford Whalers	NHL	2	1	1	2	2	—	—	—	—	—
1982–83	Binghamton Whalers	AHL	62	13	17	30	112	5	1	1	2	29
1983–84	Adirondack Red Wings	AHL	45	6	15	21	60	2	0	0	0	2
AHL totals			419	126	189	315	730	22	9	8	17	100
NHL totals			2	1	1	2	2	—	—	—	—	—
