= Jocelyn Hardy =

Canadian ice hockey player (1945–2021)

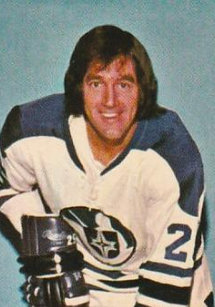
- Hardy in 1972–73
- Born: December 5, 1945; Kénogami, Quebec, Canada
- Died: February 19, 2021 (aged 75)
- Height: 6 ft 0 in (183 cm)
- Weight: 185 lb (84 kg; 13 st 3 lb)
- Position: Centre
- Shot: Left
- Played for: California Golden Seals; Cleveland Crusaders; Chicago Cougars; Indianapolis Racers; San Diego Mariners
- Playing career: 1966–1978

Jocelyn Joseph Hardy (December 5, 1945 – February 19, 2021) was a Canadian professional ice hockey player who played 210 games in the World Hockey Association and 63 games in the National Hockey League. He played for the Chicago Cougars, California Golden Seals, Cleveland Crusaders, San Diego Mariners, and Indianapolis Racers. He died as result of complications from a heart attack on February 19, 2021, at the age of 75.

After leaving the WHA, Hardy became a player-coach with the Beauce Jaros of the North American Hockey League. Hardy was the league's top scorer and most valuable player during the 1975–76 season. During that season he became the first professional player to score over 200 points in a season, finishing with 208.

Subsequent coaching duties included the Binghamton Dusters, Shawinigan Cataractes, and Beauport Harfangs.

== Career statistics ==
=== Regular season and playoffs ===
			Regular season					Playoffs
Season	Team	League	GP	G	A	Pts	PIM	GP	G	A	Pts	PIM
1964–65	Jonquière Marquis	QJHL	—	—	—	—	—	—	—	—	—	—
1965–66	Jonquière Marquis	QJHL	—	—	—	—	—	—	—	—	—	—
1966–67	New Haven Blades	EHL	72	28	51	79	77	—	—	—	—	—
1967–68	Victoriaville Tigres	QHL	41	13	23	36	39	12	4	8	12	4
1968–69	Victoriaville Tigres	QHL	45	25	54	79	75	—	—	—	—	—
1969–70	Oakland Seals	NHL	23	5	4	9	20	4	0	0	0	0
1969–70	Providence Reds	AHL	46	11	27	38	44	—	—	—	—	—
1969–70	Seattle Totems	WHL	—	—	—	—	—	2	1	0	1	4
1970–71	California Golden Seals	NHL	40	4	10	14	31	—	—	—	—	—
1971–72	Nova Scotia Voyageurs	AHL	65	18	42	60	105	15	3	7	10	20
1972–73	Cleveland Crusaders	WHA	72	17	33	50	80	7	0	2	2	0
1973–74	Chicago Cougars	WHA	77	24	35	59	55	17	4	8	12	13
1974–75	Chicago Cougars	WHA	17	1	6	7	8	—	—	—	—	—
1974–75	Long Island Cougars	NAHL	4	1	2	3	2	—	—	—	—	—
1974–75	Indianapolis Racers	WHA	32	2	17	19	36	—	—	—	—	—
1974–75	San Diego Mariners	WHA	12	2	3	5	22	3	0	0	0	0
1975–76	Beauce Jaros	NAHL	72	60	148	208	98	14	4	24	28	44
1976–77	Beauce Jaros	NAHL	22	7	36	43	30	—	—	—	—	—
1976–77	Broome Dusters	NAHL	28	22	28	50	19	8	2	8	10	6
1977–78	Binghamton Dusters	AHL	73	24	63	87	56	—	—	—	—	—
WHA totals			210	46	94	140	201	27	4	10	14	13
NHL totals			63	9	14	23	51	4	0	0	0	0
