= Gerry Methe =

Canadian ice hockey defenceman

- Born: December 12, 1951 (age 73); Ottawa, Ontario, Canada
- Height: 5 ft 10 in (178 cm)
- Weight: 170 lb (77 kg; 12 st 2 lb)
- Position: Defence
- Shot: Left
- Played for: New England Whalers (WHA)
- NHL draft: 46th overall, 1971; Pittsburgh Penguins
- Playing career: 1972–1977

Gerald Paul "Gerry" Methe (born December 12, 1951) is a Canadian former professional ice hockey defenceman.

== Career ==
Methe was selected by the Pittsburgh Penguins in the fourth round (46th overall) of the 1971 NHL Amateur Draft. Methe played five regular season and two playoff games with the New England Whalers of the World Hockey Association during the 1974–75 season.

As a youth, he played in the 1964 Quebec International Pee-Wee Hockey Tournament with a minor ice hockey team from Richmond Hill, Ontario. Prior to turning professional, Methe played major junior hockey with the Oshawa Generals of the Ontario Hockey Association.

The Toledo Goaldiggers of the International Hockey League acquired Methe halfway through the 1975-76 season after the Cape Codders folded mid-season.

== Career statistics ==
			Regular season					Playoffs
Season	Team	League	GP	G	A	Pts	PIM	GP	G	A	Pts	PIM
1968–69	Oshawa Generals	OHA-Jr.	46	8	14	22	97	—	—	—	—	—
1969–70	Oshawa Generals	OHA-Jr.	54	16	29	45	126	—	—	—	—	—
1970–71	Oshawa Generals	OHA-Jr.	59	24	34	58	176	—	—	—	—	—
1971–72	Fort Wayne Komets	IHL	42	2	10	12	62	8	3	3	6	16
1972–73	Hershey Bears	AHL	74	14	27	41	140	7	0	1	1	13
1973–74	Hershey Bears	AHL	50	10	16	26	62	14	1	3	4	28
1974–75	New England Whalers	WHA	5	0	1	1	4	2	0	0	0	0
1974–75	Cape Cod Codders	NAHL-Sr.	56	17	22	39	117	1	0	0	0	17
1975–76	Cape Cod Codders	NAHL-Sr.	22	11	10	21	30	—	—	—	—	—
1975–76	Toledo Goaldiggers	IHL	11	3	7	10	45	4	1	2	3	0
1976–77	Broome Dusters	NAHL-Sr.	65	23	45	68	105	10	4	6	10	19
WHA totals			5	0	1	1	4	2	0	0	0	0
AHL totals			124	24	43	67	202	21	1	4	5	41
IHL totals			53	5	17	22	107	12	4	5	9	16
