= Ted Ouimet =

Canadian ice hockey player

- Born: July 6, 1947 (age 78); Noranda, Quebec, Canada
- Height: 5 ft 9 in (175 cm)
- Weight: 165 lb (75 kg; 11 st 11 lb)
- Position: Goaltender
- Caught: Right
- Played for: St. Louis Blues; New England Whalers
- Playing career: 1968–1975

Edward John "Teddy" Ouimet (born July 6, 1947) is a Canadian former professional ice hockey goaltender. He played one game in the National Hockey League with the St. Louis Blues during the 1968–69 season and one game in the World Hockey Association with the New England Whalers during the 1974–75 season. The rest of his career, which lasted from 1968 to 1975, was spent in the minor leagues.

== Biography ==
Born in the Quebec mining town of Rouyn-Noranda, Ouimet played three years with the Montreal Junior Canadiens, where he led the Ontario Hockey Association in shutouts (3) and GAA (2,75) before joining the London Nationals in 1967–68. In June 1968 he was traded to the St. Louis Blues in a cash deal by the Montreal Canadiens.

Ouimet played one game for the Blues during his rookie season in the pros but spent most of his time with the Kansas City Blues of the Central Hockey League. He continued to toil in the minors until 1975 and also played one game for the New England Whalers of the World Hockey Association. Before retiring after the 1974–75 season, Ouimet's best year was in 1973-74 when he recorded a 2.97 goals against average for the Syracuse Blazers and was named to the North American Hockey League. First All-Star Team.

Ted had three sons: Terry Ouimet, Mark Ouimet and Jesse Ouimet.

== Career statistics ==
=== Regular season and playoffs ===
| | | | Regular season | | | | | | | | | Playoffs |
| Season | Team | League | GP | W | L | T | MIN | GA | SO | GAA | SV% | GP | W | L | MIN | GA | SO | GAA | SV% |
|---|---|---|---|---|---|---|---|---|---|---|---|---|---|---|---|---|---|---|---|
| 1964–65 | Montreal Junior Canadiens | OHA | 5 | — | — | — | 300 | 20 | 0 | 4.00 | — | 1 | — | — | 20 | 0 | 0 | 0.00 | 1.000 |
| 1965–66 | Montreal Junior Canadiens | OHA | 32 | — | — | — | 1920 | 88 | 3 | 2.75 | — | 10 | — | — | 600 | 28 | 1 | 2.80 | — |
| 1966–67 | Montreal Junior Canadiens | OHA | 41 | — | — | — | 2450 | 177 | 2 | 4.33 | — | 6 | — | — | 320 | 27 | 0 | 5.09 | — |
| 1967–68 | London Nationals | OHA | 35 | — | — | — | 2093 | 166 | 0 | 4.76 | — | 2 | — | — | 120 | 7 | 0 | 3.50 | — |
| 1968–69 | St. Louis Blues | NHL | 1 | 0 | 1 | 0 | 60 | 2 | 0 | 2.02 | .935 | — | — | — | — | — | — | — | — |
| 1968–69 | Kansas City Blues | CHL | 22 | — | — | — | — | 32 | 0 | 4.00 | — | — | — | — | — | — | — | — | — |
| 1969–70 | Kansas City Blues | CHL | 6 | 1 | 4 | 1 | 360 | 29 | 0 | 4.83 | — | — | — | — | — | — | — | — | — |
| 1969–70 | San Diego Gulls | WHL | 18 | 10 | 8 | 0 | 1050 | 71 | 0 | 4.06 | — | 3 | 2 | 1 | 165 | 12 | 0 | 4.37 | — |
| 1970–71 | Kansas City Blues | CHL | 8 | — | — | — | — | 32 | 0 | 4.00 | — | — | — | — | — | — | — | — | — |
| 1970–71 | Port Huron Flags | IHL | 27 | — | — | — | 1588 | 104 | 1 | 3.93 | — | 3 | — | — | 140 | 14 | 0 | 6.00 | — |
| 1971–72 | Port Huron Wings | IHL | 1 | 1 | 0 | 0 | 60 | 5 | 0 | 5.00 | — | — | — | — | — | — | — | — | — |
| 1971–72 | Jacksonville Rockets | EHL | 17 | — | — | — | 870 | 72 | 0 | 4.97 | — | — | — | — | — | — | — | — | — |
| 1971–72 | Syracuse Blazers | EHL | 18 | 8 | 10 | 0 | 1130 | 77 | 0 | 4.19 | — | 14 | — | — | 840 | 45 | 1 | 3.21 | — |
| 1972–73 | Cleveland/Jacksonville Barons | AHL | 19 | — | — | — | 909 | 74 | 0 | 4.88 | — | — | — | — | — | — | — | — | — |
| 1973–74 | Syracuse Blazers | NAHL | 35 | — | — | — | 2119 | 105 | 0 | 2.97 | — | 6 | — | — | 341 | 12 | 0 | 2.11 | — |
| 1974–75 | New England Whalers | WHA | 1 | 0 | 0 | 0 | 20 | 3 | 0 | 9.00 | .769 | — | — | — | — | — | — | — | — |
| 1975–76 | Cape Codders | NAHL | 45 | 21 | 16 | 4 | 2551 | 161 | 2 | 3.79 | — | 4 | — | — | 240 | 14 | 0 | 3.50 | — |
| WHA totals | | | 1 | 0 | 0 | 0 | 20 | 3 | 0 | 9.00 | .769 | — | — | — | — | — | — | — | — |
| NHL totals | | | 1 | 0 | 1 | 0 | 60 | 2 | 0 | 2.02 | .935 | — | — | — | — | — | — | — | — |

== See also ==
- List of players who played only one game in the NHL
