= Pierre Roy =

Canadian ice hockey player

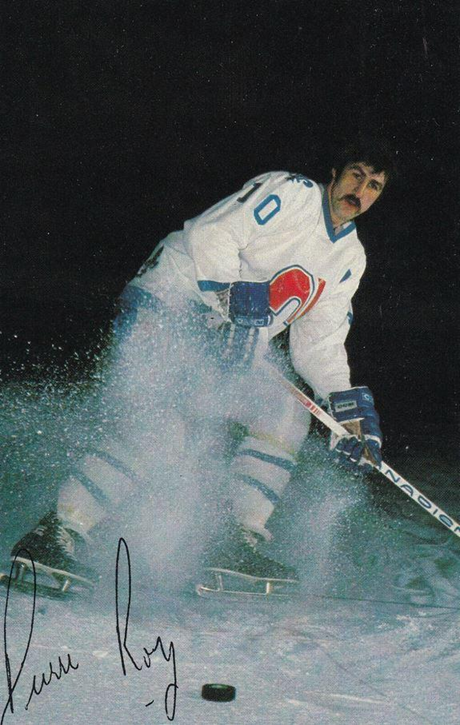
- Born: March 12, 1952 (age 74) Thetford Mines, Quebec, Canada
- Height: 6 ft 0 in (183 cm)
- Weight: 172 lb (78 kg; 12 st 4 lb)
- Position: Defence
- Shot: Left
- Played for: Quebec Nordiques; Cincinnati Stingers; New England Whalers
- NHL draft: 130th overall, 1972; Atlanta Flames
- Playing career: 1972–1979

Pierre Roy (born March 12, 1952) is a Canadian retired professional ice hockey player who played 316 games in the World Hockey Association. He played for the Quebec Nordiques, Cincinnati Stingers, and New England Whalers.

== Career statistics ==
			Regular season					Playoffs
Season	Team	League	GP	G	A	Pts	PIM	GP	G	A	Pts	PIM
1969–70	Quebec Remparts	QMJHL	55	1	18	19	159	15	2	3	5	8
1970–71	Quebec Remparts	QMJHL	40	0	16	16	147	14	1	9	10	39
1971–72	Quebec Remparts	QMJHL	50	3	22	25	137	15	2	3	5	31
1972–73	Quebec Nordiques	WHA	64	7	12	19	169	—	—	—	—	—
1973–74	Quebec Nordiques	WHA	44	2	7	9	137	—	—	—	—	—
1973–74	Maine Nordiques	NAHL-Sr.	38	4	19	23	138	—	—	—	—	—
1974–75	Quebec Nordiques	WHA	61	1	18	19	118	15	0	9	9	40
1975–76	Quebec Nordiques	WHA	78	6	30	36	258	5	1	2	3	29
1976–77	Quebec Nordiques	WHA	29	3	5	8	50	—	—	—	—	—
1976–77	Cincinnati Stingers	WHA	39	3	12	15	126	3	0	1	1	7
1976–77	Maine Nordiques	NAHL-Sr.	6	1	1	2	11	—	—	—	—	—
1977–78	Nova Scotia Voyageurs	AHL	81	5	24	29	261	11	0	3	3	50
1978–79	Springfield Indians	AHL	55	2	10	12	312	—	—	—	—	—
1978–79	Binghamton Dusters	AHL	17	0	7	7	104	—	—	—	—	—
1978–79	New England Whalers	WHA	1	0	0	0	2	—	—	—	—	—
WHA totals			316	22	84	106	860	23	1	12	13	76
