= Doug Brindley =

Canadian ice hockey player

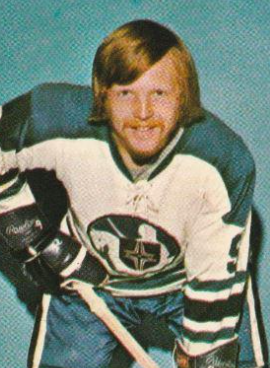
- Brindley in 1972–73
- Born: June 8, 1949 (age 75); Walkerton, Ontario, Canada
- Height: 5 ft 11 in (180 cm)
- Weight: 175 lb (79 kg; 12 st 7 lb)
- Position: Centre
- Shot: Left
- Played for: Toronto Maple Leafs; Cleveland Crusaders
- NHL draft: 20th overall, 1969; Toronto Maple Leafs
- Playing career: 1969–1976

Douglas Allen Brindley (born June 8, 1949) is a Canadian retired professional ice hockey forward. Brindley played three games in the National Hockey League for the Toronto Maple Leafs during the 1970–71 season and 103 games in the World Hockey Association with the Cleveland Crusaders between 1972 and 1974. The rest of his career, which lasted from 1969 to 1976, was spent in the minor leagues.

== Career statistics ==
=== Regular season and playoffs ===
			Regular season					Playoffs
Season	Team	League	GP	G	A	Pts	PIM	GP	G	A	Pts	PIM
1967–68	Niagara Falls Flyers	OHA	54	15	28	45	20	19	15	7	22	18
1967–68	Niagara Falls Flyers	M-Cup	—	—	—	—	—	10	6	2	8	6
1968–69	Niagara Falls Flyers	OHA	54	40	37	77	62	14	12	6	18	16
1969–70	Tulsa Oilers	CHL	65	22	25	47	14	6	0	6	6	0
1969–70	Buffalo Bisons	AHL	—	—	—	—	—	1	0	1	1	0
1970–71	Toronto Maple Leafs	NHL	3	0	0	0	0	—	—	—	—	—
1970–71	Tulsa Oilers	CHL	65	29	38	67	17	—	—	—	—	—
1971–72	Rochester Americans	AHL	74	20	27	47	12	—	—	—	—	—
1972–73	Cleveland Crusaders	WHA	73	15	11	26	6	9	0	0	0	6
1973–74	Cleveland Crusaders	WHA	30	13	9	22	13	5	0	1	1	2
1973–74	Jacksonville Barons	AHL	50	19	14	33	65	—	—	—	—	—
1974–75	Mohawk Valley Comets	NAHL	71	28	44	72	26	—	—	—	—	—
1975–76	Syracuse Blazers	NAHL	70	43	58	101	3	8	0	8	8	4
WHA totals			103	28	20	48	19	14	0	1	1	8
NHL totals			3	0	0	0	0	—	—	—	—	—
