= Bryan McSheffrey =

Canadian ice hockey player

- Born: September 25, 1952 (age 73) Ottawa, Ontario, Canada
- Height: 6 ft 2 in (188 cm)
- Weight: 205 lb (93 kg; 14 st 9 lb)
- Position: Right wing
- Shot: Right
- Played for: Vancouver Canucks; Buffalo Sabres
- NHL draft: 19th overall, 1972; Vancouver Canucks
- Playing career: 1972–1980

Bryan Gerald McSheffrey (born September 25, 1952) is a Canadian former professional ice hockey forward. He was drafted in the second round, 19th overall, by the Vancouver Canucks in the 1972 NHL Amateur Draft. He played in the National Hockey League with the Canucks and Buffalo Sabres between 1972 and 1974.

In his NHL career, McSheffrey appeared in 90 games. He scored thirteen goals and added seven assists. He finished his professional career by playing two seasons in the Netherlands, where he scored 58 goals and added 66 assists in 38 games with HYS Intervam.

== Career statistics ==
=== Regular season and playoffs ===
			Regular season					Playoffs
Season	Team	League	GP	G	A	Pts	PIM	GP	G	A	Pts	PIM
1967–68	Oshawa Generals	OHA	1	0	1	1	0	—	—	—	—	—
1968–69	Ottawa 67's	OHA	53	10	7	17	12	7	1	1	2	2
1969–70	Ottawa 67's	OHA	54	35	32	67	51	5	0	1	1	6
1970–71	Ottawa 67's	OHA	57	38	41	79	86	11	7	7	14	27
1971–72	Ottawa 67's	OHA	61	52	44	96	63	13	4	9	13	20
1972–73	Seattle Totems	WHL	39	27	22	49	24	—	—	—	—	—
1972–73	Vancouver Canucks	NHL	33	4	4	8	10	—	—	—	—	—
1973–74	Vancouver Canucks	NHL	54	9	3	12	34	—	—	—	—	—
1974–75	Buffalo Sabres	NHL	3	0	0	0	0	—	—	—	—	—
1974–75	Hershey Bears	AHL	47	12	8	20	20	11	1	0	1	0
1975–76	Buffalo Norsemen	NAHL	46	27	31	58	26	—	—	—	—	—
1975–76	Cape Codders	NAHL	3	1	0	1	0	—	—	—	—	—
1975–76	Mohawk Valley Comets	NAHL	12	4	3	7	0	4	0	2	2	6
1976–77	Mohawk Valley Comets	NAHL	63	29	43	72	28	3	0	1	1	0
1977–78	Long Beach Sharks	PHL	18	7	8	15	11	—	—	—	—	—
1978–79	HYS The Hague	NED	36	61	54	115	37	—	—	—	—	—
1979–80	HYS The Hague	NED	22	26	34	60	0	—	—	—	—	—
NHL totals			90	13	7	20	44	—	—	—	—	—
