= Paul Stewart (ice hockey) =

American ice hockey player and referee

- Born: March 21, 1953 (age 73) Dorchester, Massachusetts, U.S.
- Height: 6 ft 1 in (185 cm)
- Weight: 195 lb (88 kg; 13 st 13 lb)
- Position: Left wing
- Shot: Left
- Played for: Edmonton Oilers; Cincinnati Stingers; Quebec Nordiques
- NHL draft: Undrafted
- WHA draft: Undrafted
- Playing career: 1975–1983

Paul Stewart (born March 21, 1953) is an American former professional ice hockey player and referee. Inducted in the United States Hockey Hall of Fame in 2018, he is the grandson of Bill Stewart. He played 65 games in the World Hockey Association (WHA) between 1976 and 1979, and 21 games in the National Hockey League (NHL) during the 1979–80 season. He later worked as a referee in the NHL from 1986 until 2003

== Career ==
Stewart played in both the World Hockey Association and the National Hockey League. He played with Mark Messier for the Cincinnati Stingers. His last season of top-level professional hockey was 1979–80 with the Quebec Nordiques.

After his playing days ended, he had a lengthy career as an NHL referee, beginning in 1986. He officiated 1,010 regular season games (including Guy Lafleur's final NHL game), 49 playoff games, the 1987 Canada Cup, the 1991 Canada Cup and two All-Star games. He never wore a helmet during his officiating career. From the 1994–95 NHL season until his retirement in 2003, he wore uniform number 22.

Stewart was the men's and women's league director of officiating for ECAC Hockey, and in 2012, also took on duties as a judicial and discipline consultant to the Kontinental Hockey League.

== Personal life ==
Stewart graduated with a Bachelor of Arts in Asian History from the University of Pennsylvania in 1976. He is the only Penn alumnus to play in the NHL, as the university's varsity hockey program was discontinued in 1978.

== Career statistics ==
=== Regular season and playoffs ===
			Regular season					Playoffs
Season	Team	League	GP	G	A	Pts	PIM	GP	G	A	Pts	PIM
1975–76	University of Pennsylvania	ECAC	—	—	—	—	—	—	—	—	—	—
1975–76	Broome Dusters	NAHL	46	3	4	7	273	—	—	—	—	—
1976–77	Broome Dusters	NAHL	60	4	13	17	232	10	1	1	2	35
1976–77	Edmonton Oilers	WHA	2	0	0	0	2	—	—	—	—	—
1976–77	New Haven Nighthawks	AHL	1	0	0	0	6	—	—	—	—	—
1977–78	Cincinnati Stingers	WHA	40	1	5	6	241	—	—	—	—	—
1977–78	Binghamton Dusters	AHL	21	5	2	7	69	—	—	—	—	—
1978–79	Cincinnati Stingers	WHA	23	2	1	3	45	3	0	0	0	0
1978–79	Cape Cod Freedoms	NEHL	18	2	3	5	33	—	—	—	—	—
1978–79	Philadelphia Firebirds	AHL	16	2	0	2	92	—	—	—	—	—
1978–79	Binghamton Dusters	AHL	7	1	2	3	40	—	—	—	—	—
1979–80	Quebec Nordiques	NHL	21	2	0	2	74	—	—	—	—	—
1979–80	Cincinnati Stingers	CHL	20	1	2	3	79	—	—	—	—	—
1979–80	Birmingham Bulls	CHL	10	0	0	0	56	—	—	—	—	—
1980–81	Binghamton Whalers	AHL	15	2	1	3	59	—	—	—	—	—
1981–82	Cape Cod Buccaneers	ACHL	5	0	2	2	20	—	—	—	—	—
1982–83	Mohawk Valley Stars	ACHL	—	—	—	—	—	2	0	0	0	2
WHA totals			65	3	6	9	288	—	—	—	—	—
NHL totals			21	2	0	2	74	—	—	—	—	—
