= Norm Dubé =

Canadian ice hockey player (born 1951)

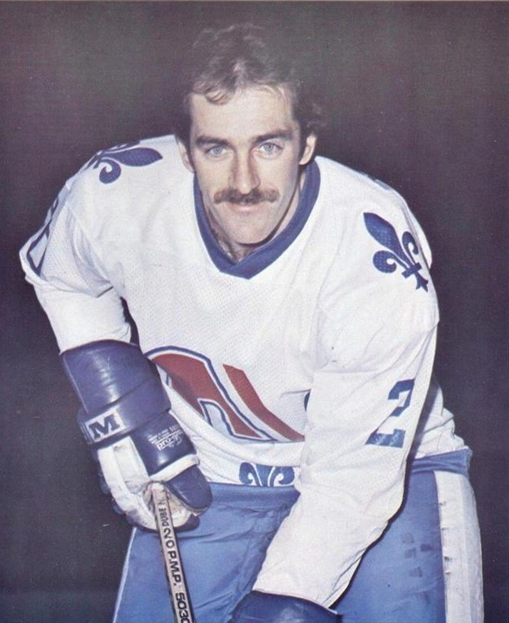
- Dube in 1979 photo
- Born: September 12, 1951 (age 74) Sherbrooke, Quebec, Canada
- Height: 5 ft 11 in (180 cm)
- Weight: 185 lb (84 kg; 13 st 3 lb)
- Position: Left wing
- Shot: Left
- Played for: Kansas City Scouts; Quebec Nordiques
- NHL draft: 90th overall, 1971; Los Angeles Kings
- Playing career: 1972–1988

Normand G. Dubé (born September 12, 1951) is a Canadian former professional ice hockey player who played 57 games in the National Hockey League and 148 games in the World Hockey Association. He played with the Kansas City Scouts and Quebec Nordiques. His son Christian Dubé played with his teammates when he was very young.

== Career statistics ==
			Regular season					Playoffs
Season	Team	League	GP	G	A	Pts	PIM	GP	G	A	Pts	PIM
1969–70	Sherbrooke Castors	QMJHL	52	19	34	53	27	—	—	—	—	—
1970–71	Sherbrooke Castors	QMJHL	62	72	66	138	17	8	4	7	11	10
1971–72	Université de Sherbrooke	QUAA	21	25	30	55	67	—	—	—	—	—
1972–73	Springfield Kings	AHL	66	30	30	60	21	—	—	—	—	—
1973–74	Springfield Kings	AHL	48	32	21	53	10	—	—	—	—	—
1974–75	Kansas City Scouts	NHL	56	8	10	18	54	—	—	—	—	—
1974–75	Providence Reds	AHL	14	5	0	5	4	—	—	—	—	—
1975–76	Kansas City Scouts	NHL	1	0	0	0	0	—	—	—	—	—
1975–76	Springfield Indians	AHL	67	31	38	69	28	—	—	—	—	—
1976–77	Beauce Jaros	NAHL	29	20	32	52	12	—	—	—	—	—
1976–77	Quebec Nordiques	WHA	39	15	18	33	8	14	3	12	15	11
1977–78	Quebec Nordiques	WHA	73	16	31	47	17	10	2	2	4	6
1978–79	Quebec Nordiques	WHA	36	2	13	15	4	—	—	—	—	—
1978–79	Binghamton Dusters	AHL	36	9	24	33	18	8	4	5	9	14
1979–80	Nova Scotia Voyageurs	AHL	79	40	61	101	49	6	4	2	6	2
1980–81	HC Sierre	CHE.2	36	40	29	69	—	—	—	—	—	—
1981–82	HC Sierre	CHE.2	38	53	36	89	—	—	—	—	—	—
1982–83	HC Sierre	CHE.2	32	36	28	64	—	—	—	—	—	—
1983–84	HC Sierre	CHE.2	32	38	35	73	—	—	—	—	—	—
1984–85	HC Sierre	CHE.2	13	12	7	19	—	—	—	—	—	—
1985–86	HC La Chaux–de–Fonds	CHE.3	—	—	—	—	—	—	—	—	—	—
1986–87	HC Martigny	CHE.3	—	—	—	—	—	—	—	—	—	—
1987–88	HC Martigny	CHE.2	4	1	6	7	2	—	—	—	—	—
AHL totals			310	147	174	321	130	14	8	7	15	16
WHA totals			148	33	62	95	29	24	5	14	19	17
CHE.2 totals			155	180	141	321	—	—	—	—	—	—
