= Bob Collyard =

American ice hockey player

- Born: October 16, 1949 (age 76) Hibbing, Minnesota, U.S.
- Height: 5 ft 8 in (173 cm)
- Weight: 170 lb (77 kg; 12 st 2 lb)
- Position: Center
- Shot: Left
- Played for: St. Louis Blues; VfL Bad Nauheim
- National team: United States
- NHL draft: 73rd overall, 1969; St. Louis Blues
- Playing career: 1971–1983

Robert Leander Collyard (born October 16, 1949) is an American former professional ice hockey center. He played 10 games in the National Hockey League (NHL) for the St. Louis Blues during the 1973–74 season. After the season, he was selected by the Washington Capitals in the 1974 NHL Expansion Draft with the 30th pick in the draft, but he never played for Washington. The rest of his career, which lasted from 1971 to 1983, was mainly spent in the minor leagues. Internationally Collyard played for the American national team at the 1978 and 1979 World Championships.

== Career statistics ==
=== Regular season and playoffs ===
			Regular season					Playoffs
Season	Team	League	GP	G	A	Pts	PIM	GP	G	A	Pts	PIM
1966–67	Hibbing/Chisholm High School	HS-MN	—	—	—	—	—	—	—	—	—	—
1968–69	Colorado College	WCHA	25	31	17	48	46	—	—	—	—	—
1969–70	Colorado College	WCHA	30	18	39	57	36	—	—	—	—	—
1970–71	Colorado College	WCHA	30	20	37	57	6	—	—	—	—	—
1970–71	Kansas City Blues	CHL	2	0	0	0	0	—	—	—	—	—
1971–72	Kansas City Blues	CHL	59	13	22	35	14	—	—	—	—	—
1972–73	Fort Worth Wings	CHL	67	17	50	67	53	4	2	3	5	2
1973–74	St. Louis Blues	NHL	10	1	3	4	4	—	—	—	—	—
1973–74	Denver Spurs	WHL	65	27	47	74	22	—	—	—	—	—
1974–75	Philadelphia Firebirds	NAHL	72	42	61	103	78	4	3	3	6	12
1975–76	Philadelphia Firebirds	NAHL	73	45	84	129	82	16	12	25	37	10
1976–77	Philadelphia Firebirds	NAHL	71	31	85	116	76	4	3	2	5	7
1977–78	Philadelphia Firebirds	AHL	79	28	62	90	42	4	0	1	1	0
1978–79	Philadelphia Firebirds	AHL	69	21	35	56	32	—	—	—	—	—
1979–80	VfL Bad Nauheim	GER	37	19	34	53	56	—	—	—	—	—
1980–81	VfL Bad Nauheim	GER	44	29	25	54	23	5	2	2	4	28
1981–82	Milwaukee Admirals	IHL	77	24	46	70	32	5	2	2	4	9
1982–83	Milwaukee Admirals	IHL	10	0	4	4	0	—	—	—	—	—
1982–83	Kalamazoo Wings	IHL	5	0	6	6	0	—	—	—	—	—
NAHL totals			216	118	230	348	236	24	18	30	48	29
NHL totals			10	1	3	4	4	—	—	—	—	—

=== International ===
Year	Team	Event	GP	G	A	Pts	PIM
1978	United States	WC	10	1	5	6	2
1979	United States	WC	8	2	0	2	8
Senior totals			18	3	5	8	10

== Awards and honors ==
Award	Year
All-WCHA Second Team	1968–69
AHCA West All-American	1968–69
All-WCHA First Team	1969–70
AHCA West All-American	1969–70
All-WCHA First Team	1970–71

- CHL Second All-Star Team (1972–73)
- NAHL Second All-Star Team (1974–75, 1975–76, 1976–77)
