= Pierre Henry (ice hockey) =

Canadian ice hockey player

- Born: March 10, 1952 (age 73); Montreal, Quebec, Canada
- Height: 5 ft 10 in (178 cm)
- Weight: 180 lb (82 kg; 12 st 12 lb)
- Position: Centre
- Shot: Left
- Played for: Philadelphia Blazers
- NHL draft: Undrafted
- Playing career: 1972–1976

Pierre Henry (born March 10, 1952) is a Canadian former professional ice hockey centre who played in the World Hockey Association (WHA). Henry played part of the 1972–73 WHA season with the Philadelphia Blazers.

== Career statistics ==
			Regular season					Playoffs
Season	Team	League	GP	G	A	Pts	PIM	GP	G	A	Pts	PIM
1969–70	Drummondville Rangers	QMJHL	56	8	30	38	167	6	4	9	13	24
1970–71	Drummondville Rangers	QMJHL	60	21	46	67	114	6	4	6	10	4
1971–72	Drummondville Rangers	QMJHL	60	33	49	82	108	9	3	6	9	9
1972–73	Roanoke Valley Rebels	EHL	45	19	24	43	76	16	7	14	21	23
1972–73	Philadelphia Blazers	WHA	19	2	3	5	13	—	—	—	—	—
1973–74	Roanoke Valley Rebels	SHL	68	21	26	47	112	14	5	6	11	32
1974–75	Philadelphia Firebirds	NAHL	63	23	34	57	65	4	1	1	2	0
1975–76	Philadelphia Firebirds	NAHL	67	30	38	68	84	9	5	4	9	0
WHA totals			19	2	3	5	13	—	—	—	—	—
