= George Swarbrick =

Canadian ice hockey player

- Born: February 16, 1942 (age 83) Moose Jaw, Saskatchewan, Canada
- Height: 5 ft 10 in (178 cm)
- Weight: 172 lb (78 kg; 12 st 4 lb)
- Position: Right wing
- Shot: Right
- Played for: Oakland Seals; Pittsburgh Penguins; Philadelphia Flyers
- National team: Canada
- Playing career: 1964–1977

George Raymond Swarbrick (born February 16, 1942) is a Canadian former professional ice hockey player. He played 132 National Hockey League (NHL) games with the Oakland Seals, Pittsburgh Penguins, and Philadelphia Flyers. Swarbrick was born in Moose Jaw, Saskatchewan.

== Olympics ==
Swarbrick played for Canada in the 1964 Winter Olympics. He scored 3 goals and had 3 assists in 7 games played, but missed a medal as Canada finished in a three-way tie and controversially ended up in fourth place.

== Career statistics ==
=== Regular season and playoffs ===
| | | | Regular season | | | | | Playoffs |
| Season | Team | League | GP | G | A | Pts | PIM | GP | G | A | Pts | PIM |
|---|---|---|---|---|---|---|---|---|---|---|---|---|
| 1959–60 | Moose Jaw Canucks | SJHL | 59 | 17 | 13 | 30 | 48 | — | — | — | — | — |
| 1960–61 | Moose Jaw Canucks | SJHL | 50 | 17 | 17 | 34 | 94 | 6 | 1 | 3 | 4 | 6 |
| 1960–61 | Moose Jaw Canucks | M-Cup | — | — | — | — | — | 4 | 0 | 1 | 1 | 5 |
| 1960–61 | Vancouver Canucks | WHL | 3 | 0 | 0 | 0 | 0 | — | — | — | — | — |
| 1961–62 | Moose Jaw Canucks | SJHL | 55 | 40 | 36 | 76 | 75 | — | — | — | — | — |
| 1962–63 | Saskatoon Quakers | SSHL | — | — | — | — | — | — | — | — | — | — |
| 1962–63 | Moose Jaw Pla-Mors | SSHL | 38 | 29 | 28 | 57 | 92 | 5 | 5 | 2 | 7 | 11 |
| 1963–64 | Canadian National Team | Intl | — | — | — | — | — | — | — | — | — | — |
| 1963–64 | Moose Jaw Pla-Mors | SSHL | — | — | — | — | — | 5 | 7 | 8 | 15 | 23 |
| 1964–65 | San Francisco Seals | WHL | 70 | 22 | 22 | 44 | 66 | — | — | — | — | — |
| 1965–66 | San Francisco Seals | WHL | 71 | 20 | 21 | 41 | 89 | 7 | 3 | 2 | 5 | 8 |
| 1966–67 | California Seals | WHL | 71 | 31 | 22 | 53 | 75 | 6 | 1 | 3 | 4 | 16 |
| 1967–68 | California/Oakland Seals | NHL | 49 | 13 | 5 | 18 | 62 | — | — | — | — | — |
| 1968–69 | Oakland Seals | NHL | 50 | 3 | 13 | 16 | 75 | — | — | — | — | — |
| 1968–69 | Pittsburgh Penguins | NHL | 19 | 1 | 6 | 7 | 28 | — | — | — | — | — |
| 1969–70 | Pittsburgh Penguins | NHL | 12 | 0 | 1 | 1 | 8 | — | — | — | — | — |
| 1969–70 | Baltimore Clippers | AHL | 56 | 19 | 22 | 41 | 81 | 4 | 0 | 3 | 3 | 8 |
| 1970–71 | Baltimore Clippers | AHL | 34 | 4 | 7 | 11 | 54 | — | — | — | — | — |
| 1970–71 | Philadelphia Flyers | NHL | 2 | 0 | 0 | 0 | 0 | — | — | — | — | — |
| 1970–71 | Hershey Bears | AHL | 24 | 10 | 8 | 18 | 56 | 4 | 0 | 2 | 2 | 6 |
| 1971–72 | San Diego Gulls | WHL | 54 | 25 | 19 | 44 | 105 | 4 | 0 | 0 | 0 | 7 |
| 1972–73 | San Diego Gulls | WHL | 64 | 13 | 23 | 36 | 115 | 6 | 1 | 2 | 3 | 25 |
| 1973–74 | Omaha Knights | CHL | 65 | 23 | 30 | 53 | 89 | 5 | 2 | 2 | 4 | 20 |
| 1974–75 | Long Island Cougars | NAHL | 68 | 31 | 47 | 78 | 171 | 10 | 6 | 5 | 11 | 34 |
| 1975–76 | Erie Blades | NAHL | 27 | 10 | 9 | 19 | 46 | 5 | 3 | 2 | 5 | 13 |
| 1976–77 | Philadelphia Firebirds | NAHL | 74 | 32 | 27 | 59 | 91 | 4 | 1 | 2 | 3 | 6 |
| WHL totals | | | 333 | 111 | 107 | 218 | 450 | 23 | 5 | 7 | 12 | 56 |
| NHL totals | | | 132 | 17 | 25 | 42 | 173 | — | — | — | — | — |

=== International ===
| Year | Team | Event | GP | G | A | Pts | PIM |
|---|---|---|---|---|---|---|---|
| 1964 | Canada | OLY | 7 | 3 | 3 | 6 | 2 |
| Senior totals | | | 7 | 3 | 3 | 6 | 2 |
