= Michel Dion =

Canadian ice hockey player (born 1954)

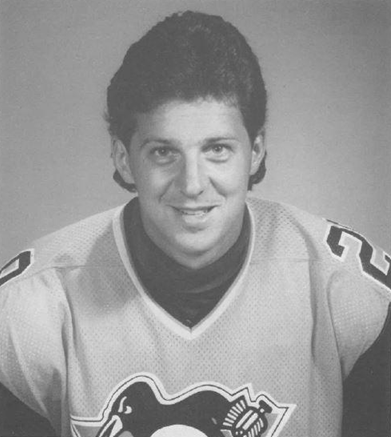
- Born: February 11, 1954 (age 72) Granby, Quebec, Canada
- Height: 5 ft 10 in (178 cm)
- Weight: 185 lb (84 kg; 13 st 3 lb)
- Position: Goaltender
- Caught: Left
- Played for: Indianapolis Racers; Cincinnati Stingers; Quebec Nordiques; Winnipeg Jets; Pittsburgh Penguins
- NHL draft: Undrafted
- WHA draft: 121st overall, 1974; Indianapolis Racers
- Playing career: 1975–1985

Michel J. Dion (born February 11, 1954) is a Canadian former professional ice hockey goaltender who was active in the World Hockey Association and National Hockey League from 1975 to 1985. He also played minor league baseball before deciding on a career in professional hockey.

== Playing career ==
Dion enjoyed a successful junior hockey career with the Montreal Bleu Blanc Rouge and initially hoped for a career as a professional baseball player. During the 1971 and 1972 seasons, Dion played professional baseball in the Montreal Expos' organization with the Cocoa Expos and with the West Palm Beach Expos. Eventually, he gave up on baseball in favour of hockey.

After playing his first two pro seasons with the NAHL's Mohawk Valley Comets, Dion joined the WHA's Indianapolis Racers in the second half of the 1975–76 season. His play in the last 31 games of the season earned Dion the Ben Hatskin Trophy as the league's top netminder.

After playing two years with the Cincinnati Stingers, Dion was claimed by the Quebec Nordiques in the Dispersal Draft following the WHA/NHL merger in 1979. Dion excelled in 50 games in Quebec, and kept them in many games late in the season when they were decimated by injuries.

Dion was traded to the Winnipeg Jets for cash in 1980-81 after abandoning his team during a game against the Boston Bruins. In June 1981, he signed as a free agent with the Pittsburgh Penguins and enjoyed his best NHL season. Dion recorded 25 wins for the Pens in 1981-82 and was chosen to play in the NHL all-star game. He also starred in the opening round of the playoffs when Pittsburgh nearly upset the defending Stanley Cup champion New York Islanders. Dion was solid over the next two years but only played ten games in 1984–85. He spent most of the year in the American Hockey League before retiring from hockey.

Dion lives in Bluffton, South Carolina. He is a certified Master golf instructor with the USGTF. He is also currently an instructor at PGCC.

== Career statistics ==
=== Regular season and playoffs ===
			Regular season									Playoffs
Season	Team	League	GP	W	L	T	MIN	GA	SO	GAA	SV%	GP	W	L	MIN	GA	SO	GAA	SV%
1969–70	Montreal Jr. Canadiens	OHA	8	—	—	—	430	39	0	5.44	—	—	—	—	—	—	—	—	—
1972–73	Granby Vicks	QJHL	—	—	—	—	—	—	—	—	—	—	—	—	—	—	—	—	—
1972–73	Montreal Bleu Blanc Rouge	QMJHL	8	—	—	—	479	39	0	4.88	.868	—	—	—	—	—	—	—	—
1973–74	Montreal Juniors	QMJHL	31	—	—	—	1840	135	0	4.40	.869	1	—	—	60	4	0	4.00	—
1974–75	Indianapolis Racers	WHA	1	0	1	0	59	4	0	4.07	.895	—	—	—	—	—	—	—	—
1974–75	Mohawk Valley Comets	NAHL	28	10	12	2	1476	96	0	3.90	—	—	—	—	—	—	—	—	—
1975–76	Indianapolis Racers	WHA	31	14	15	1	1860	85	0	2.74	.910	3	0	2	126	5	0	2.38	—
1975–76	Mohawk Valley Comets	NAHL	22	—	—	—	1295	83	0	3.84	—	—	—	—	—	—	—	—	—
1976–77	Indianapolis Racers	WHA	42	17	19	3	2286	128	1	3.36	.891	4	2	2	245	17	0	4.16	—
1977–78	Cincinnati Stingers	WHA	45	21	17	1	2356	140	4	3.57	.885	—	—	—	—	—	—	—	—
1978–79	Cincinnati Stingers	WHA	30	10	14	2	1681	93	0	3.32	.873	—	—	—	—	—	—	—	—
1979–80	Quebec Nordiques	NHL	50	15	25	6	2765	171	2	3.71	.887	—	—	—	—	—	—	—	—
1980–81	Quebec Nordiques	NHL	12	0	8	3	686	61	0	5.33	.826	—	—	—	—	—	—	—	—
1980–81	Indianapolis Checkers	CHL	6	2	3	0	364	19	0	3.13	.856	—	—	—	—	—	—	—	—
1980–81	Winnipeg Jets	NHL	14	3	6	3	756	61	0	4.84	.864	—	—	—	—	—	—	—	—
1981–82	Pittsburgh Penguins	NHL	62	25	24	12	3572	226	0	3.80	.878	5	2	3	310	22	0	4.25	.880
1982–83	Pittsburgh Penguins	NHL	49	12	30	4	2780	198	0	4.27	.868	—	—	—	—	—	—	—	—
1983–84	Pittsburgh Penguins	NHL	30	2	19	4	1551	138	0	5.34	.852	—	—	—	—	—	—	—	—
1984–85	Pittsburgh Penguins	NHL	10	3	6	0	550	43	0	4.69	.863	—	—	—	—	—	—	—	—
1984–85	Baltimore Skipjacks	AHL	21	10	6	2	1118	65	0	3.49	—	5	2	2	229	9	0	2.36	—
WHA totals			149	62	66	7	8242	450	5	3.28	.890	7	2	4	375	22	0	3.56	—
NHL totals			227	60	118	32	12,660	898	2	4.26	.870	5	2	3	310	22	0	4.25	.880
