= Bob Murphy (ice hockey) =

Canadian ice hockey player

- Born: January 27, 1951 (age 75) Toronto, Ontario, Canada
- Height: 5 ft 10 in (178 cm)
- Weight: 181 lb (82 kg; 12 st 13 lb)
- Position: Forward
- Shoots: Left
- Played for: AHL; Rochester Americans; EHL; Cape Cod Cubs; Syracuse Blazers; NAHL; Mohawk Valley Comets; Maine Nordiques
- NHL draft: 102nd overall, 1971; Vancouver Canucks

Bob Murphy (born January 27, 1951) is a Canadian former professional ice hockey player. He was selected by the Vancouver Canucks in the 11th round (102nd overall) of the 1971 NHL Amateur Draft.

== Early life ==
Murphy was born in 1951 in Toronto, Ontario. He played junior ice hockey with the Weston Dodgers and Cornwall Royals.

== Career ==
Murphy began his professional career in 1971 with the Syracuse Blazers of the Eastern Hockey League and played five seasons in the minor leagues before retiring following the 1975-76 season as a member of the Maine Nordiques of the North American Hockey League.

Murphy played 298 professional games, scoring 113 goals and 268 points, while racking up 247 penalty minutes.
