= Larry Kish =

Canadian-born American ice hockey player/coach (1941–2025)

Larry Kish (December 11, 1941 – January 2, 2025) was a Canadian-born American professional hockey coach. He was the head coach of the Hartford Whalers of the National Hockey League for 49 games during the 1982–83 NHL season.

== Biography ==
Kish was born in Welland, Ontario, Canada on December 11, 1941. He played minor hockey for Peterborough TPT Petes of the Ontario Hockey Association from 1958 to 1960. He later went on to play the 1963–64 season for Providence College.

He began his coaching career with the Lowell Chiefs in 1970. He coached the 1972–73 season with the Rhode Island Eagles. He coached two seasons with the Cape Codders of the North American Hockey League. During the 1975–76 season the Binghamton Dusters hired after the Cape Codders temporarily folded. He was let go after the 1977–78 season when the Dusters changed their affiliation to the Quebec Nordiques. From 1980 to 1982 he was the head coach of the Binghamton Whalers. After a 46–28–6 record in the 1981–82 AHL season, Kish's Whalers made it to the Calder Cup Finals, where they lost to the New Brunswick Hawks. Kish won the Louis A. R. Pieri Memorial Award as AHL coach of the year. He was promoted to coach the parent club in Hartford for the 1982–83 season. After a lackluster 12–32–5 performance over the first 49 games, Kish was fired and replaced by his replacement in Binghamton, Larry Pleau. Pleau, ironically, had been the man Kish replaced as Hartford's head coach.

Kish spent from 1984–87 as head coach of the Nova Scotia Oilers, making the playoffs twice besides having three losing seasons. He later coached the Wheeling Thunderbirds of the ECHL during the 1995–96 season.

Kish died in Naples, Florida, on January 2, 2025, at the age of 83.

== NHL coaching record ==
Team	Year	Regular season						Post season
Team	Year	G	W	L	T	Pts	Finish	Result
Hartford Whalers	1982-83	49	12	32	5	(29)	5th in Adams	Missed Playoffs

== Awards and honors ==
Award	Year
All-ECAC Hockey First Team	1962–63
All-ECAC Hockey First Team	1963–64
AHCA East All-American	1963–64
ECAC Hockey All-Tournament First Team	1964
NCAA All-Tournament Second Team	1964

Sporting positions
Preceded by Larry Pleau	Head coach of the Hartford Whalers; 1982	Succeeded by Larry Pleau
