= Lorne Molleken =

Canadian ice hockey player and coach

- Born: June 11, 1956 (age 69) Regina, Saskatchewan, Canada
- Height: 6 ft 1 in (185 cm)
- Weight: 190 lb (86 kg; 13 st 8 lb)
- Position: Goaltender
- Caught: Left
- Played for: Saginaw Gears; Springfield Indians; Binghamton Dusters; Indianapolis Checkers; Toledo Goaldiggers
- Playing career: 1976–1985

Lorne Molleken (born June 11, 1956) is a Canadian former ice hockey goaltender and coach. Molleken was head coach of the Chicago Blackhawks at the end of the 1999 and the beginning of the 2000 season. He was nominally demoted to an assistant under Bob Pulford in December 1999, but Pulford allowed Molleken to continue making most of the on-ice decisions while serving largely as a senior consultant.

He is remembered primarily for receiving a black eye from Washington Capitals general manager George McPhee following an infamous September 25, 1999, preseason game in which, among other things, Capitals winger Trevor Halverson suffered a career-ending concussion. McPhee received a thirty-day suspension and a fine from the league.

== Career ==
Born in Regina, Saskatchewan, Molleken began his pro career with the Philadelphia Firebirds of the North American Hockey League in 1976–77. He moved to the International Hockey League and tended goal for the Saginaw Gears and Toledo Goaldiggers, played in the Central Hockey League with the Indianapolis Checkers, and reached the American Hockey League with the Binghamton Dusters and, primarily, for the Springfield Indians.

He would also coach the Saskatoon Blades, Cape Breton Oilers, Hamilton Bulldogs, Regina Pats, and Chicago Blackhawks, and also serve as an assistant with the San Jose Sharks and Pittsburgh Penguins.

The Vancouver Giants announced on Tuesday, June 30, that Lorne Molleken has been named the sixth Head Coach in the club's history. On March 18, 2016, Molleken was fired as head coach of the Vancouver Giants.

== Personal life ==
Molleken is the uncle of Major League Baseball player Dustin Molleken.

== Coaching record ==
Team	Year	Regular season							Postseason
Team	Year	G	W	L	T	OTL	Pts	Division rank	Result
CHI	1998–99	23	13	6	4	-	(73)	3rd in Central	Missed Playoffs
CHI	1999–2000	24	5	13	4	2	(78)	3rd in Central	(demoted)
Total		47	18	19	8	2			

Preceded by Dirk Graham	Head coach of the Chicago Blackhawks; 1999	Succeeded by Bob Pulford
