= Dunc McCallum =

Canadian ice hockey player (1940–1983)

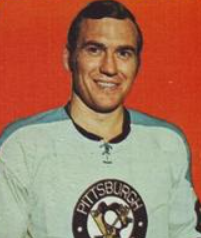
- McCallum in 1971 card
- Born: March 29, 1940 Flin Flon, Manitoba, Canada
- Died: March 31, 1983 (aged 43)
- Height: 6 ft 1 in (185 cm)
- Weight: 193 lb (88 kg; 13 st 11 lb)
- Position: Defenceman
- Shot: Right
- Played for: Chicago Cougars; Houston Aeros; New York Rangers; Pittsburgh Penguins
- Playing career: 1960–1975

Duncan Selbie McCallum (March 29, 1940 – March 31, 1983) was a Canadian professional ice hockey player who played 187 games in the National Hockey League with the New York Rangers, and Pittsburgh Penguins, and 100 games in the World Hockey Association with the Chicago Cougars, Houston Aeros from 1966 to 1975. A broken leg in 1973 during an exhibition game precluded the end of his playing career. He was born in Flin Flon, Manitoba.

After his playing career, McCallum coached the Brandon Wheat Kings of the Western Hockey League for five seasons, winning Coach of the Year honours in two of them. He decided to step down at the conclusion of the 1981-82 season. He had a wife, with whom he had three daughters. In the summer of 1982, McCallum had surgery on a malignant brain tumour. After suffering a setback in his recovery, McCallum died on March 31, 1983. The Coach of the Year trophy was renamed the Dunc McCallum Memorial Trophy in his honour after his death. He is buried at Brandon Municipal Cemetery.

== Career statistics ==
=== Regular season and playoffs ===
			Regular season					Playoffs
Season	Team	League	GP	G	A	Pts	PIM	GP	G	A	Pts	PIM
1958–59	Brandon Wheat Kings	MJHL	28	10	11	21	48	—	—	—	—	—
1959–60	Brandon Wheat Kings	MJHL	32	8	9	17	84	11	4	3	7	10
1959–60	Brandon Wheat Kings	M-Cup	—	—	—	—	—	11	4	3	7	21
1959–60	Edmonton Oil Kings	M-Cup	—	—	—	—	—	6	0	1	1	8
1960–61	Fort Wayne Komets	IHL	65	6	18	24	74	8	0	3	3	6
1961–62	Seattle Totems	WHL	69	1	12	13	82	2	1	0	1	2
1962–63	Sudbury Wolves	EPHL	62	5	20	25	153	8	1	2	3	8
1963–64	Vancouver Canucks	WHL	62	6	13	19	78	—	—	—	—	—
1964–65	Vancouver Canucks	WHL	68	8	11	19	104	5	1	0	1	10
1965–66	New York Rangers	NHL	2	0	0	0	2	—	—	—	—	—
1965–66	Vancouver Canucks	WHL	68	5	19	24	104	7	1	1	2	16
1966–67	Omaha Knights	CPHL	38	3	16	19	91	10	0	3	3	23
1967–68	Baltimore Clippers	AHL	19	3	7	10	37	—	—	—	—	—
1967–68	Pittsburgh Penguins	NHL	32	0	2	2	36	—	—	—	—	—
1968–69	Pittsburgh Penguins	NHL	62	5	13	18	81	—	—	—	—	—
1969–70	Baltimore Clippers	AHL	4	2	0	2	6	—	—	—	—	—
1969–70	Pittsburgh Penguins	NHL	14	0	0	0	16	10	1	2	3	12
1970–71	Pittsburgh Penguins	NHL	77	9	20	29	95	—	—	—	—	—
1971–72	San Diego Gulls	WHL	61	10	30	40	99	4	1	1	2	2
1972–73	Houston Aeros	WHA	69	9	20	29	112	10	2	3	5	6
1974–75	Chicago Cougars	WHA	31	0	10	10	24	—	—	—	—	—
1974–75	Long Island Cougars	NAHL	10	1	6	7	30	—	—	—	—	—
WHA totals			100	9	30	39	136	10	2	3	5	6
NHL totals			187	14	35	49	230	10	1	2	3	12

== Awards and achievements ==
- Turnbull Cup MJHL Championship (1960)
- WCHL Coach of the Year (1977)
- Ed Chynoweth Cup (WHL) Championship (1979)
- WHL Coach of the Year (1979)
- Honoured Member of the Manitoba Hockey Hall of Fame
