= Cape Cod Cubs (EHL) =

- City: South Yarmouth, Massachusetts
- League: EHL (1972–1973); NAHL (1973–1974)
- Founded: 1972
- Folded: 1974
- Home arena: Cape Cod Coliseum
- Colors: White, Gold and Black
- Owner: William Harrison
- Head coach: Bronco Horvath

Franchise history
- 1972–1974: Cape Cod Cubs
- 1974–1976: Cape Codders

The Cape Cod Cubs were a professional ice hockey team that played at the Cape Cod Coliseum in South Yarmouth, Massachusetts.

The Cubs started play as an expansion franchise in the Eastern Hockey League in 1972, the same year their home arena, the Cape Cod Coliseum, was constructed. An affiliate of the National Hockey League's Boston Bruins, their general manager was Jack Crawford, a former All-Star defenceman with the Bruins, and they were coached by former Bruin Bronco Horvath. The Cubs won the EHL's Central Division championship in their first year of play. When the EHL folded, the Cubs became founding members of the North American Hockey League for the 1973–74 season. After the season, the team was renamed as the 'Cape Codders'.
