= Paul Larose =

Canadian ice hockey player

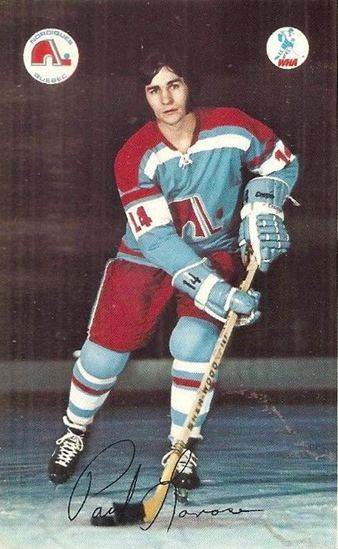
- Larose in 1972 card
- Born: November 1, 1950 (age 75) Noranda, Quebec, Canada
- Height: 5 ft 8 in (173 cm)
- Weight: 165 lb (75 kg; 11 st 11 lb)
- Position: Forward
- Shot: Right
- Played for: WHA; Quebec Nordiques; Michigan Stags/Baltimore Blades
- NHL draft: 91st overall, 1970; Toronto Maple Leafs
- Playing career: 1972–1975

Paul Larose (born November 1, 1950) is a Canadian retired ice hockey forward who played 33 games in the World Hockey Association for the Quebec Nordiques and Michigan Stags/Baltimore Blades.

== Career statistics ==
			Regular season					Playoffs
Season	Team	League	GP	G	A	Pts	PIM	GP	G	A	Pts	PIM
1969–70	Trois-Rivières Ducs	QMJHL	33	31	35	66	38	—	—	—	—	—
1969–70	Quebec Remparts	QMJHL	24	21	45	66	28	—	—	—	—	—
1970–71	Syracuse Blazers	EHL	74	43	27	70	46	6	3	1	4	6
1971–72	Syracuse Blazers	EHL	75	67	62	129	61	17	15	15	30	0
1972–73	Syracuse Blazers	EHL	15	10	18	28	12	—	—	—	—	—
1972–73	Quebec Nordiques	WHA	28	0	7	7	7	—	—	—	—	—
1973–74	Maine Nordiques	NAHL	70	53	66	119	20	8	3	6	9	6
1974–75	Maine Nordiques	NAHL	73	54	49	103	49	—	—	—	—	—
1974–75	Michigan Stags/Baltimore Blades	WHA	5	1	1	2	2	—	—	—	—	—
1975–76	Maine Nordiques	NAHL	71	41	73	114	22	4	1	2	3	2
1976–77	Maine Nordiques	NAHL	73	31	60	91	32	12	2	6	8	6
WHA totals			33	1	8	9	9	—	—	—	—	—
