= 1973–74 NAHL season =

The 1973–74 North American Hockey League season was the first season of the North American Hockey League. Seven teams participated in the regular season, and the Syracuse Blazers were the league champions.

== Regular season ==
North American Hockey League	GP	W	L	OTL	GF	GA	Pts
Syracuse Blazers	74	54	16	4	359	219	112
Maine Nordiques	74	45	26	3	398	309	93
Long Island Cougars	74	35	36	3	310	277	73
Cape Cod Cubs	74	34	39	1	338	345	69
Johnstown Jets	74	32	38	4	265	303	68
Broome Dusters	74	28	41	5	274	352	61
Mohawk Valley Comets	74	20	52	2	240	385	42

== Lockhart Cup-Playoffs ==
=== Qualification ===
Qualification	GP	W	L	GF	GA
Syracuse Blazers	7	6	1	39	19
Cape Cod Cubs	8	5	3	28	26
Long Island Cougars	7	4	3	23	22
Johnstown Jets	8	3	5	27	32
Maine Nordiques	8	1	7	28	46

Note: Syracuse-Long Island game was ruled a no contest following a brawl.

Lockhart Cup-Semifinals
1	Syracuse Blazers	4
4	Johnstown Jets	1
2	Cape Cod Cubs	2
3	Long Island Cougars	4

Lockhart Cup-Final
1	Syracuse Blazers	4
3	Long Island Cougars	0
