= Jack Crawford (ice hockey) =

Canadian ice hockey player and coach (1916–1973)

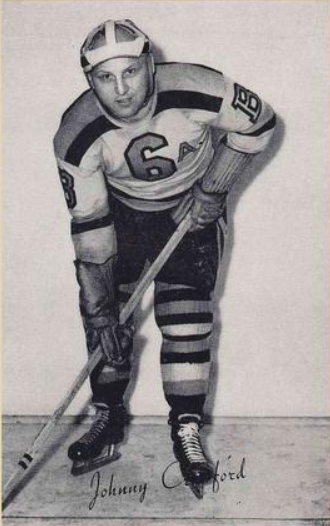
- Born: October 26, 1916 Dublin, Ontario, Canada
- Died: January 19, 1973 (aged 56) Barnstable, Massachusetts, U.S.
- Height: 5 ft 11 in (180 cm)
- Weight: 190 lb (86 kg; 13 st 8 lb)
- Position: Defence
- Shot: Right
- Played for: Boston Bruins
- Playing career: 1937–1952

John Shea Crawford (October 26, 1916 – January 19, 1973) was a Canadian ice hockey defenceman and coach. He was born in Dublin, Ontario. Despite Crawford's preference to be called "Johnny" or "John", the media often referred to him as "Jack".

Crawford started his National Hockey League career with the Boston Bruins in 1938. He played his entire career with the Bruins and retired after the 1950 season. In 1943 and 1946, he was a member of the NHL All-Star team. He won two Stanley Cups with Boston 1939, 1941.

Crawford later coached 659 games in the American Hockey League He died at the Cape Cod Hospital on January 19, 1973. He was 56 years old.

== Amateur career ==
Crawford was born on October 26, 1916, in Dublin, Ontario. He had begun playing hockey at an early age but began to take it more seriously as a teenager and competed in the Ontario Junior league, winning the first ever Sutherland Cup as All-Ontario Junior "B" Champions in 1934. He then played for both the St. Michael’s Majors and the West Toronto Nationals between 1934 and 1936. At 19, he moved up to the Toronto McColl-Fronteacs of the TIHL, where he played defense in 1936. In his final year Crawford joined the Kirkland Lake Blue Devils (GBHL), where he shined as a shut-down defenseman, also showing his offensive abilities by scoring six goals and ten points in nine games. After this the Boston Bruins signed him to their farm team the Providence Reds (IAHL) for the 1937-1938 season.

== Pro career ==
Crawford played in 46 games for the Reds during the 1937-1938 season and gained the attention of his coaching staff he resulting in him making his first two appearances with the Boston Bruins before the end of the season. After several strong performances during training camp the following year he earned a promotion to the Bruins blueline for the 1938-1939 season. The 5’11, 190-pound defender went on to have a solid rookie year in the NHL appearing in all 48 games that season, helping the Bruins win that year’s Stanley Cup.

He remained key part of the team for his entire 12 year NHL career. Helping the team win another Cup during the 1940-1941 season. During his tenure he was relied on as a vital pieces of the Bruins blueline.

Crawford had a breakout year during the 1942-43 season, being of the leagues top defenders resulting in him being named to the NHL Second All-Star team. The following year he had his best statistical season scoring 24 points (5 goals 19 assists). He was named Bruins Captain during the 1945-46 season, going on to have another stellar campaign resulting in him being named to the NHL First All-Star team. He continued his defensive efficiency, then playing his final year with the Bruins in 1950.

He then joined the Hershey Bears as a player-coach for two years, then retiring in 1952.

During his career Crawford was known for being one of the few players to wear a helmet. Not for the sake of protection but to hide his hairline. Crawford once stated “When I played football as a teenager for St. Mike’s, “the paint would peel off inside of my helmet and the doctors say that some chemical in the paint triggered the skin infection that caused all of my hair to fall out over the years.”

== Coaching/later career ==
After retirement Crawford went on to coach 659 games in the American Hockey League (10th on the all-time list) with the Hershey Bears (1950–52), Providence Reds (1955–60), Rochester Americans (1961–62), and Baltimore Clippers (1964–66). During the 1955-56 season Crawford coached the Reds to a Calder Cup championship.

He was the general manager of the Cape Cod Cubs of the Eastern Hockey League when he collapsed on January 17, 1973, while attending his team's home game. He died at the Cape Cod Hospital on January 19, 1973. He was 56 years old.

Crawford was married and had 4 children.

== Career statistics ==
			Regular season					Playoffs
Season	Team	League	GP	G	A	Pts	PIM	GP	G	A	Pts	PIM
1933–34	St. Michael's Buzzers	OHA-Jr.	—	—	—	—	—	—	—	—	—	—
1933–34	St. Michael's Buzzers	M-Cup	—	—	—	—	—	13	9	4	13	14
1934–35	Toronto St. Michael's Majors	OHA-Jr.	12	5	3	8	14	3	1	1	2	8
1935–36	West Toronto Nationals	OHA-Jr.	9	3	3	6	4	5	2	2	4	5
1935–36	Toronto McColl-Frontenacs	TIHL	15	0	0	0	20	4	1	0	1	4
1935–36	West Toronto Nationals	M-Cup	—	—	—	—	—	11	7	4	11	12
1936–37	Kirkland Lake Blue Devils	GBHL	9	6	4	10	20	4	0	1	1	8
1937–38	Boston Bruins	NHL	2	0	0	0	0	—	—	—	—	—
1937–38	Providence Reds	AHL	46	6	7	13	33	7	5	8	13	4
1938–39	Boston Bruins	NHL	48	4	8	12	12	12	1	1	2	9
1939–40	Boston Bruins	NHL	35	1	4	5	26	6	0	0	0	0
1940–41	Boston Bruins	NHL	45	2	8	10	27	11	0	2	2	7
1941–42	Boston Bruins	NHL	43	2	9	11	37	5	0	1	1	4
1942–43	Boston Bruins	NHL	49	5	18	23	24	6	1	1	2	10
1943–44	Boston Bruins	NHL	34	4	16	20	8	—	—	—	—	—
1944–45	Boston Bruins	NHL	40	5	19	24	10	7	0	5	5	0
1945–46	Boston Bruins	NHL	48	7	9	16	10	10	1	2	3	4
1946–47	Boston Bruins	NHL	58	1	17	18	16	2	0	W	0	0
1947–48	Boston Bruins	NHL	45	3	11	14	10	4	0	1	1	2
1948–49	Boston Bruins	NHL	55	2	13	15	14	3	0	0	0	0
1949–50	Boston Bruins	NHL	46	2	8	10	8	—	—	—	—	—
1950–51	Hershey Bears	AHL	35	1	10	11	14	5	0	2	2	0
1951–52	Hershey Bears	AHL	23	0	2	2	8	3	0	0	0	0
NHL totals			548	38	140	178	202	66	3	13	16	36

=== Head coaching record ===
Season	Team	Lge	Type	GP	W	L	T	OTL	Pct	Result
1950-51	Hershey Bears	AHL	Player-Head	70	38	28	4	0	0.571	Lost in round 2
1951-52	Hershey Bears	AHL	Player-Head	68	35	28	5	0	0.551	Lost in round 1
1955-56	Providence Reds	AHL	Head	64	45	17	2	0	0.719	Won Championship
1956-57	Providence Reds	AHL	Head	64	34	22	8	0	0.594	Lost in round 1
1957-58	Providence Reds	AHL	Head	70	33	32	5	0	0.507	Lost in round 1
1958-59	Providence Reds	AHL	Head	70	28	40	2	0	0.414	Out of Playoffs
1959-60	Providence Reds	AHL	Head	72	38	32	2	0	0.542	Lost in round 1
1961-62	Rochester Americans	AHL	Head	70	33	31	6	0	0.514	Lost in round 1
1964-65	Baltimore Clippers	AHL	Head	72	35	32	5	0	0.521	Lost in round 1
1965-66	Baltimore Clippers	AHL	Head†							

† Replaced midseason

== Awards and achievements ==
- Stanley Cup Champion (1939, 1941)
- NHL First All-Star team (1945-46)
- NHL Second All-Star team (1942-43)
- Elizabeth C. Dufresne Trophy (1944-45, 1945-46)
- Named one of the top 100 best Bruins players of all time.

== See also ==
- list of NHL players who spent their entire career with one franchise

Preceded by Bill Cowley	Boston Bruins captain 1945–46	Succeeded by Bobby Bauer
