= Cape Cod Coliseum =

Arena in South Yarmouth, Massachusetts, U.S.

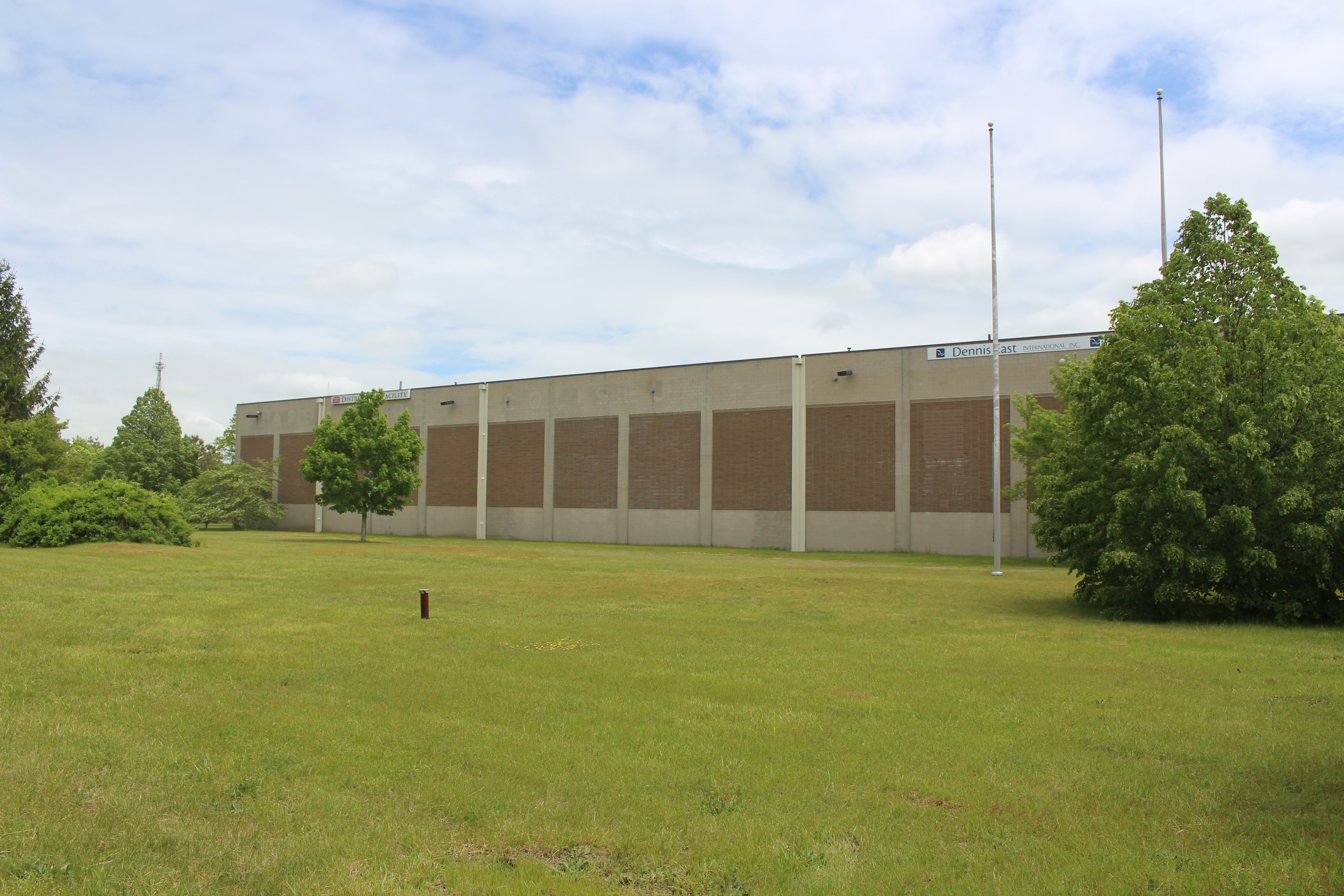
- The outside of the former Cape Cod Coliseum, circa 2013
- Interactive map of Cape Cod Coliseum
- Address: 225 Whites Path; South Yarmouth, MA 02664
- Location: South Yarmouth, Massachusetts
- Coordinates: 41°41′23.89″N 70°11′46.40″W
- Owner: Cape Cod Corporation
- Operator: Titan Sports/WWWF
- Capacity: 5,000–6,500 (hockey); 7,200 (concerts)
- Surface: Ice
- Scoreboard: Yes

Construction
- Groundbreaking: 1971
- Built: 1971–72
- Opened: 1972
- Closed: 1984

Tenants
- Cape Cod Cubs/Cape Codders (EHL/NAHL) (1972–77); Boston Lobsters (WTT) (1978); Cape Cod Freedoms (NAHL) (1978–79); Cape Cod Buccaneers (ACHL) (1981–82)

Cape Cod Coliseum was a multi-purpose arena located off White's Path in South Yarmouth, Massachusetts. In addition to sporting events, the coliseum hosted rock concerts. The 46,000-square foot concrete arena opened in 1972 and sat between 5,000–6,500 people. The arena was originally owned by Yarmouth real estate agent William Harrison and cost $1.5 million to build. In 1976, the arena was sold to Ed Fruean who owned the Coliseum for three years before selling it to Vince McMahon in 1979. In 1984, McMahon sold the building to Christmas Tree Shops who chose to utilize it as a warehouse. The final event, a World Wrestling Federation event, occurred on June 4, 1984.

== Sports ==
Vince McMahon utilized the arena for World Wrestling Entertainment, then known as the World Wrestling Federation (WWF), events from 1979 through 1984. It was home to both the Cape Cod Cubs/Cape Codders of the North American Hockey League (1973–77), the Cape Cod Freedoms of the Northeastern Hockey League (1978–1979), and the Cape Cod Buccaneers of the Atlantic Coast Hockey League (1981–82). It hosted an ESPN boxing show headlined by light middleweight contender Sean Mannion. In 1978, the Boston Lobsters played four of their 22 home matches at the Coliseum.

== Concerts ==
The Cape Cod Coliseum was one of the regular New England stops for major bands during the early 1970s until its closing in 1983. Acts ranging in style from Jim Croce to Black Sabbath would make regular appearances during the summer months. The J. Geils Band appeared ten times while another local band, Aerosmith, appeared five times. National touring acts such as Van Halen, Santana, The Clash, The Doobie Brothers and Elvis Costello made multiple appearances. The Grateful Dead played the Coliseum twice, on October 27 & 28, 1979.

== Warehouse ==
In 1984, the Coliseum was sold to Christmas Tree Shops and converted to a warehouse. After Christmas Tree Shops left the location, it served as the corporate offices of Dennis East International. As of March 2007, it houses the wares of several businesses.
