= Philadelphia Firebirds =

Philadelphia Firebirds Syracuse Firebirds
- City: Philadelphia, Pennsylvania; Syracuse, New York
- League: NAHL (1974–1977); AHL (1977–1980)
- Operated: 1974–1980
- Home arena: Philadelphia Civic Center; Onondaga County War Memorial Arena
- Colors: Red, white, yellow
- Affiliates: Philadelphia Flyers; Detroit Red Wings; Colorado Rockies; Quebec Nordiques; Pittsburgh Penguins

Franchise history
- 1974–1979: Philadelphia Firebirds
- 1979–1980: Syracuse Firebirds

Championships
- Playoff championships: 1: 1975–76 (Lockhart Cup)

The Philadelphia Firebirds were a minor league professional ice hockey team that played in Philadelphia, Pennsylvania, from 1974 to 1979, and later the franchise moved to Syracuse, New York, and played one final season as the Syracuse Firebirds. From 1974 to 1977 the Firebirds were a member club of the North American Hockey League. The Firebirds won the Lockhart Cup as NAHL playoff champions in 1976. When the NAHL folded in 1977, the Firebirds then played the American Hockey League from 1977 to 1980.

== History ==
=== NAHL, 1974–1977 ===
1974–75

The Firebirds were established for the 1974–75 NAHL season hoping to capitalize on hockey's popularity in Philadelphia. The NHL's Philadelphia Flyers had just won their first Stanley Cup in 1974, and the Philadelphia Civic Center was recently vacated by the WHA's Philadelphia Blazers, making room for a minor league team. Gregg Pilling was named head coach of the Firebirds, and led the team for three seasons. Bob Collyard emerged as the team's scoring leader with 42 goals, 61 assists, and 103 points. The team finished the season second place in the NAHL with a 40–31–3 record and 83 points. The Firebirds faced the seventh place Long Island Cougars in the first round of the playoffs. Philadelphia won the first game 4–2, but lost the next three games in the best-of-five series by scores of 2–3, 2–5 and, 2–8 to finish the season.

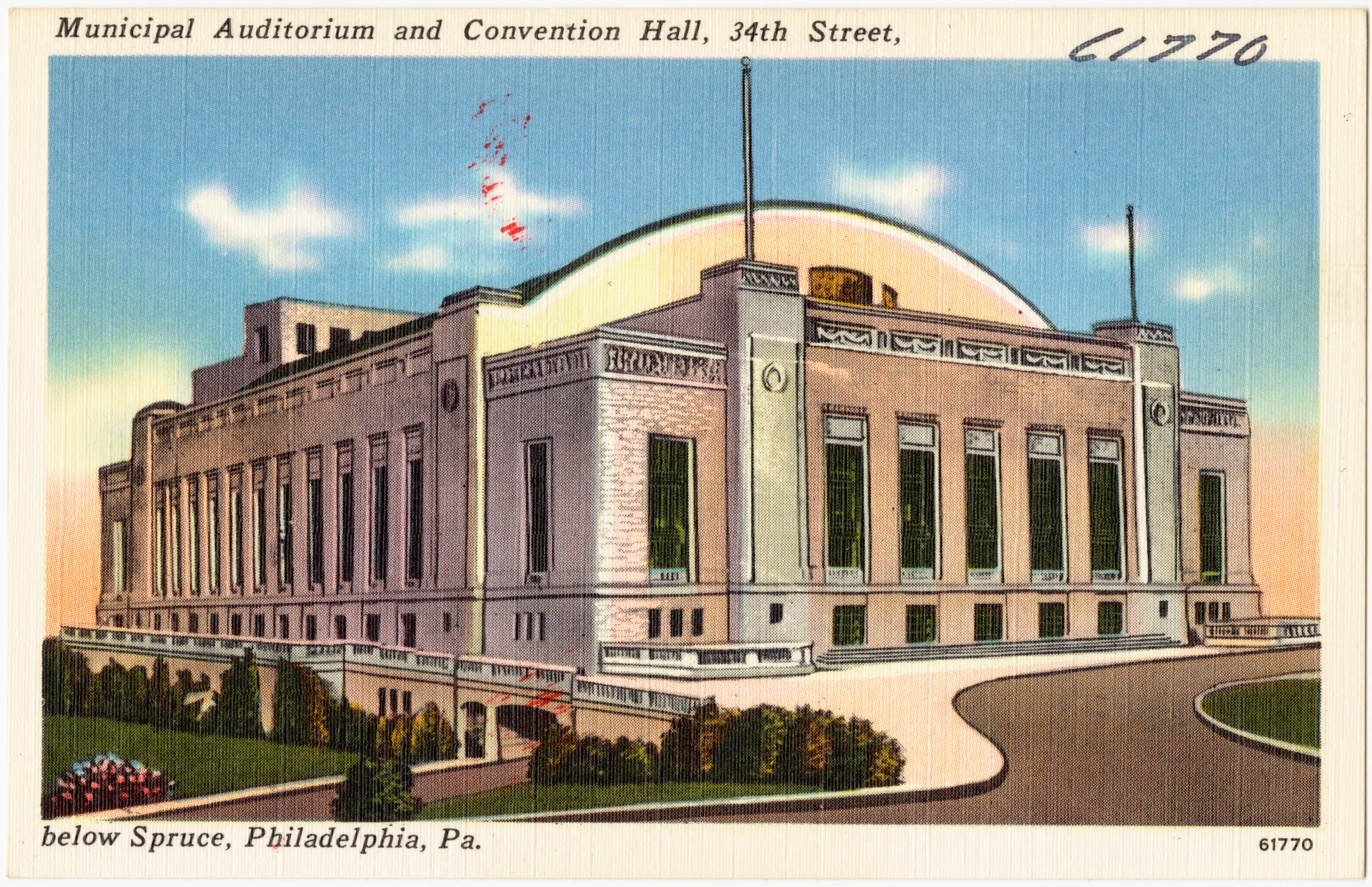
Philadelphia Civic Center

1975–76

In the 1975–76 NAHL season, Bob Collyard led the team again in scoring with 45 goals, 84 assists, and 129 points. Michel Plante nearly doubled his previous best season, and scored 52 goals, 66 assists and 118 points. Gord Brooks completed the top line with 39 goals, 54 assists and 93 points. Eleven different Firebirds had double-digit goal totals in the season, including Denis Patry with 37 goals, Pierre Henry with 30 goals, and Randy Osburn with 29 goals. The defence was led by Rychard Campeau with 17 goals, 64 assists, and 81 points; and Mike Penasse with 21 goals, 37 assists and 58 points. The Firebirds scored the second most goals in the league with 373, and earned second place in the west division, and third overall in the NAHL with a 45–29–0 record. The Firebirds faced the west division's third place team, the Erie Blades in the first round of the playoffs. Philadelphia won the first game 10–5, but lost the next two games by scores of 2–3 and 3–8. In danger of elimination in the best-of-five series, the Firebirds rebounded with 7–4 and 6–4 wins. In the second round, the Firebirds faced the west division's first place team and defending playoffs champion, the Johnstown Jets in a best-of-seven series. In a very high scoring series, Philadelphia prevailed in 5 games, by scores of 5–4, 3–6, 7–5, 4–3, and 14–10 in a wild fifth game on home ice. The Firebirds faced the Beauce Jaros in the NAHL finals, the first place team in the east division. The Jaros had won 54 games in the regular season, and led the league in goals scored with 462 and penalty minutes with 2134. On the road for the first two games, the Firebirds won 7–5, and lost 4–7. In Philadelphia for games three and four, the Firebirds won 6–1, then lost 6–7. Philadelphia won game five 6–4 on the road to set up game six at home. The Firebirds won 5–2 on home ice to win the Lockhart Cup as NAHL champions in front of a crowd of 9223 fans. Philadelphia averaged 5.94 goals scored per game during 16 playoff games. Since both Firebirds goaltenders were injured, Gaye Cooley filled in after winning the 1976 Southern Hockey League championship with the Charlotte Checkers.

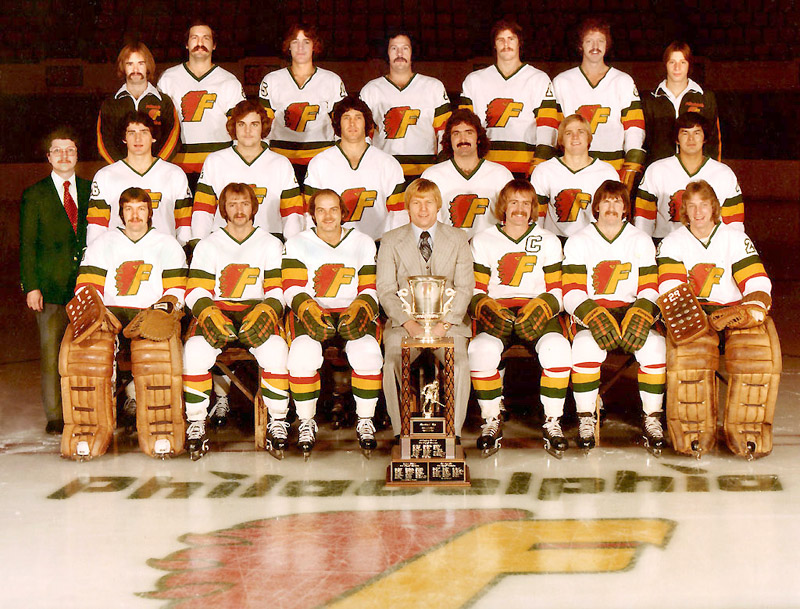
The 1976-77 Philadelphia Firebirds with the Lockhart Cup.

1976–77

In the 1976–77 NAHL season, Gord Brooks led the Firebirds with 65 goals, 59 assists, and 124 points. Bob Collyard had another good year with 31 goals, 85 assists, and 116 points. Philadelphia also had two more 32 goal scorers in George Swarbrick and Randy Osburn. Goaltender Rejean Lemelin played a career high 51 games in net with 26 wins. The team finished the season fourth place in the NAHL with a 38–33–3 record and 79 points. The Firebirds faced the fifth place Erie Blades in the first round of the playoffs. Philadelphia won the first game 4–3, but lost the next three games in the best-of-five series by scores of 4–5, 5–6 and, 1–4 to finish the season.

=== AHL, 1977–1980 ===
1977–78

When the NAHL folded after the 1976–77 season, the Firebirds acquired an American Hockey League expansion franchise for the 1977–78 AHL season, and affiliated with the NHL's Detroit Red Wings. Danny Belisle was named the new coach and general manager. The team was built with several Red Wings prospects, and many of the top players from the Firebirds' NAHL seasons returned. Gord Brooks and Bob Collyard continued to lead the team in scoring even after switching leagues. Collyard scored 28 goals, 62 assists, and 90 points. Good Brooks scored 42 goals, 56 assists, and 98 points to tie for first in the league in points scored with Rick Adduono of the Rochester Americans, sharing the John B. Sollenberger Trophy. Goaltender Rejean Lemelin led the league with 60 games played, tied for most wins with 31, and his 2.96 goals against average was second best. The Firebirds finished their first AHL season with a record of 35–35–11 and placed third in the Southern Division. In the first round of the playoffs they faced the second place New Haven Nighthawks in a best-of-five series. The Firebirds lost the first two games on the road by scores of 3–6, and 1–7. At home for game three, Philadelphia won 4–1, but lost game four 2–5, to end the season.

1978–79

For the 1978–79 AHL season, the Firebirds were affiliated with the NHL's Colorado Rockies. Head coach Danny Belisle had moved on to the Washington Capitals, and was replaced by Armand "Bep" Guidolin. Gord Brooks finished second in the league with 43 goals, and led the team with 74 points. Larry Skinner was second in team scoring with 34 goals, 33 assists, and 67 points. The Firebirds lost their first ten games of the season, before defeating the Hershey Bears on November 10. The team never recovered from the bad start, and finished last overall in the AHL with a record of 23-49-8, and missing the playoffs. The Firebirds also scored a league worst 230 goals, and had the league's lowest average attendance at only 2,841 fans per game. The bad fortunes this season led to the team's departure from Philadelphia in the off-season.

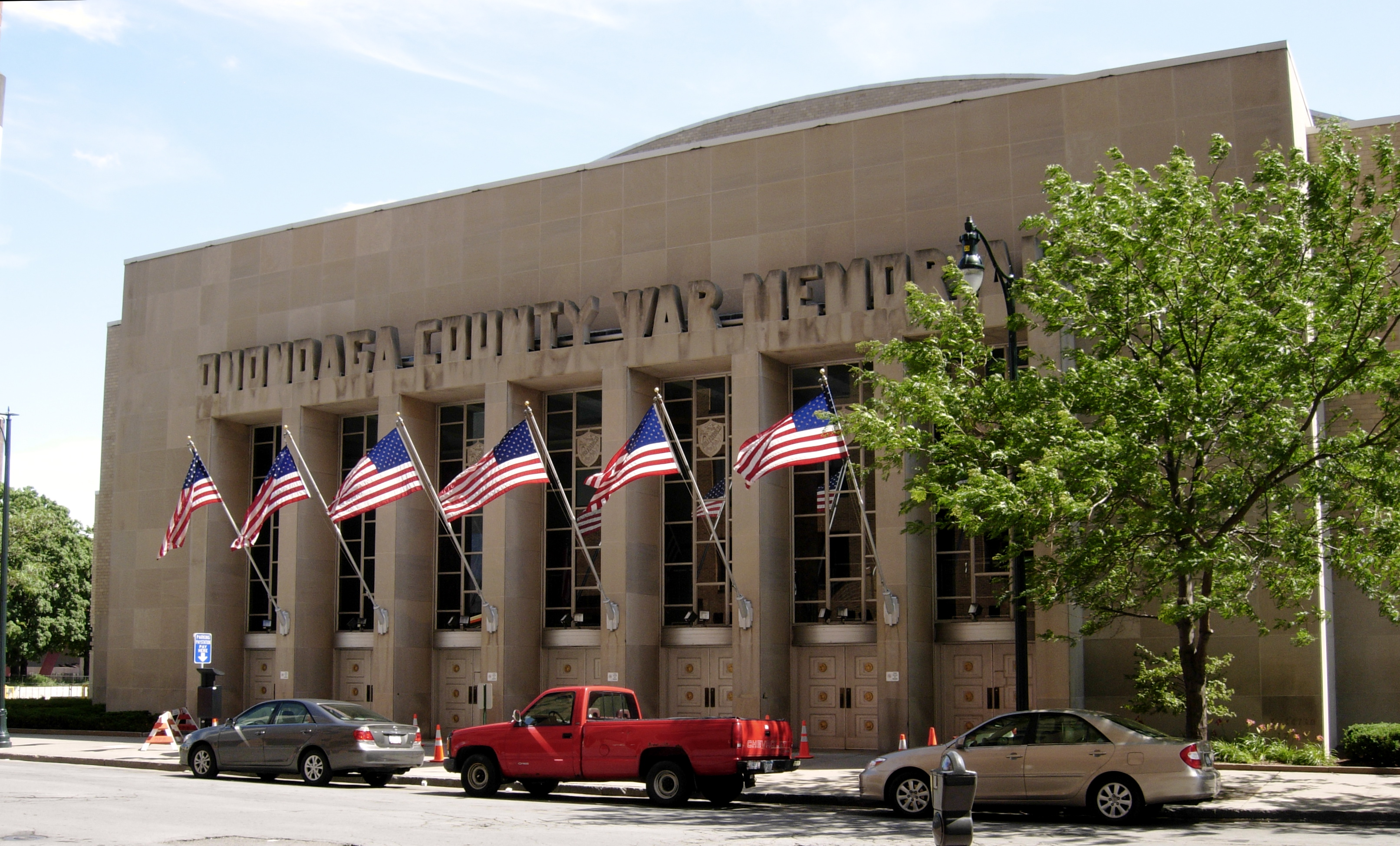
Onondaga County War Memorial Arena

1979–80

The Firebirds relocated to Syracuse, New York for the 1979–80 AHL season, playing home games at Onondaga County War Memorial Arena. The Firebirds were led by rookie coach Michel Parizeau, who recently retired from a seven-year WHA playing career. Gord Brooks led the team in scoring again with 34 goals, 41 assists, and 75 points. Syracuse struggled on defence, allowing a league worst 364 goals against, and finished with a 31–42–7 record, and third place in the southern division. The Firebirds faced second place Hershey Bears in playoffs, and lost in four straight games, by scores of 3–5, 3–5, 1–8, and 3–5. Syracuse struggled at the box office too, and had the lowest average attendance in the league at 2581 fans per game. The team was unprofitable for a second straight season and folded after the 1980 playoffs.

== Coaches ==
- Gregg Pilling (1974–75, 1975–76, 1976–77)
- Danny Belisle (1977–78)
- Bep Guidolin (1978–79)
- Michel Parizeau (1979–80)

== Players ==
Goaltender Réjean Lemelin and centre Bob Collyard were the only players to be members of the Firebirds all five seasons in Philadelphia. Lemelin went on to a fifteen-year NHL career, and coached with both the Philadelphia Flyers and Philadelphia Phantoms. Others Firebirds players that coached in the NHL include: Don Hay, Lorne Molleken, Terry Murray, and Rick Wilson. A couple other notable persons were briefly Firebirds players; including future NHL referee Paul Stewart; and Mike Eruzione, best known as the captain of the United States men's national ice hockey team that defeated the Soviet Union in the famous Miracle on Ice game at 1980 Winter Olympics.

== Season-by-season results ==
- Philadelphia Firebirds 1974–77 (NAHL)
- Philadelphia Firebirds 1977–79 (AHL)
- Syracuse Firebirds 1979–80 (AHL)

Season	Regular Season									Playoffs		
Season	League	Games	Won	Lost	Tied	Points	Goals for	Goals against	Standing	1st round	2nd round	Finals
1974–75	NAHL	74	40	31	3	83	311	288	2nd, League	L, 1–3, Long Island	—	—
1975–76	NAHL	74	45	29	0	90	373	319	2nd, West	W, 3–2, Erie	W, 4–2, Johnstown	W, 4–2, Beauce; Lockhart Cup Champions
1976–77	NAHL	74	38	33	3	79	319	294	4th, League	L, 1–3, Erie	—	—
1977–78	AHL	81	35	35	11	81	294	290	3rd, South	L, 1–3, New Haven	—	—
1978–79	AHL	80	23	49	8	54	230	347	5th, South	Out of playoffs		
1979–80	AHL	80	31	42	7	69	303	364	3rd, South	L, 0–4, Hershey	—	—
TOTALS		463	212	219	32	456	1830	1902	—	1 championship		
