= 1970–71 QMJHL season =

Canadian junior ice hockey season

The 1970–71 QMJHL season was the second season in the history of the Quebec Major Junior Hockey League. Ten teams played 62 games each in the schedule. The league dissolves East and West Divisions. The Frank J. Selke Memorial Trophy is first awarded to the most sportsmanlike player, after being the trophy for the West Division champions for the previous season.

The Quebec Remparts repeated as first place in the regular season, and won their second President's Cup, defeating the Shawinigan Bruins in the finals. After the winning the league championship, the Remparts prevailed three games to two in a controversial 1971 Richardson Cup final versus the St. Catharines Black Hawks of the Ontario Hockey Association. The Remparts then won the 1971 Memorial Cup in shortened series by defeating the Edmonton Oil Kings two games to none.

== Team changes ==
- The Laval Saints cease operations.
- East and West divisions are dissolved.

== Final standings ==
Note: GP = Games played; W = Wins; L = Losses; T = Ties; Pts = Points; GF = Goals for; GA = Goals against

Overall	GP	W	L	T	Pts	GF	GA
Quebec Remparts	62	54	7	1	109	437	205
Shawinigan Bruins	62	38	23	1	77	301	256
Trois-Rivières Ducs	62	37	24	1	75	302	245
Sherbrooke Castors	62	30	31	1	61	287	298
Verdun Maple Leafs	62	27	33	2	56	252	306
Sorel Éperviers	62	25	36	1	51	214	249
Saint-Jérôme Alouettes	62	25	36	1	51	260	300
Drummondville Rangers	62	24	35	3	51	272	310
Rosemont National	62	22	39	1	45	263	353
Cornwall Royals	62	22	40	0	44	260	326

- complete list of standings.

== Scoring leaders ==
Note: GP = Games played; G = Goals; A = Assists; Pts = Points; PIM = Penalties in minutes

Player	Team	GP	G	A	Pts	PIM
Guy Lafleur	Quebec Remparts	62	130	79	209	135
Michel Briere	Quebec Remparts	62	51	93	144	35
Andre Savard	Quebec Remparts	61	50	89	139	150
Norm Dube	Sherbrooke Castors	62	72	66	138	17
Rich Leduc	Trois-Rivières Ducs	59	56	76	132	195
Claude St. Sauveur	Sherbrooke Castors	62	52	67	119	80
Andre Peloffy	Rosemont National	60	49	69	118	67
Jacques Richard	Quebec Remparts	55	53	60	113	125
Serge Martel	Verdun Maple Leafs	62	41	60	101	12
Richard Grenier	Quebec Remparts	62	23	76	99	74

- complete scoring statistics

== Playoffs ==
Guy Lafleur was the leading scorer of the playoffs with 43 points (22 goals, 21 assists).

Quarterfinals

- Quebec Remparts defeated Verdun Maple Leafs 4 games to 0, 1 tie.
- Shawinigan Bruins defeated Saint-Jérôme Alouettes 4 games to 1.
- Trois-Rivières Ducs defeated Sorel Éperviers 4 games to 3.
- Sherbrooke Castors defeated Drummondville Rangers 4 games to 2.

Semifinals

- Quebec Remparts defeated Trois-Rivières Ducs 4 games to 0.
- Shawinigan Bruins defeated Sherbrooke Castors 4 games to 0, 1 tie.

Finals

- Quebec Remparts defeated Shawinigan Bruins 4 games to 1.

== All-star teams ==
First team

- Goalkeeper – Michel Deguise, Sorel Éperviers
- Left defence – Pierre Roy, Quebec Remparts
- Right defence – Richard Campeau, Sorel Éperviers
- Left winger – Jacques Richard, Quebec Remparts
- Centreman – Richard Leduc, Trois-Rivières Ducs
- Right winger – Guy Lafleur, Quebec Remparts
- Coach – Claude Dolbec, Shawinigan Bruins

Second team

- Goalkeeper – Raynald Belanger, Shawinigan Bruins
- Left defence – Pierre Archambault, Saint-Jérôme Alouettes
- Right defence – Michel Ruest, Cornwall Royals
- Left winger – Normand Dube, Sherbrooke Castors
- Centreman – Andre Savard, Quebec Remparts
- Right winger – Yves Bergeron, Shawinigan Bruins
- Coach – Maurice Filion, Quebec Remparts
- List of First/Second/Rookie team all-stars.

== Trophies and awards ==
Team

- President's Cup – Playoff champions, Quebec Remparts
- Jean Rougeau Trophy – Regular Season Champions, Quebec Remparts

Player

- Jean Béliveau Trophy – Top Scorer, Guy Lafleur, Quebec Remparts
- Jacques Plante Memorial Trophy – Best GAA, Raynald Fortier, Quebec Remparts
- Michel Bergeron Trophy – Rookie of the Year, Bob Murphy, Cornwall Royals
- Frank J. Selke Memorial Trophy – Most sportsmanlike player, Normand Dube, Sherbrooke Castors

== See also ==
- 1971 Memorial Cup
- 1971 NHL entry draft
- 1970–71 OHA season
- 1970–71 WCHL season
- George Richardson Memorial Trophy

Preceded by 1969–70 QMJHL season	QMJHL seasons	Succeeded by 1971–72 QMJHL season
