= Beauce Jaros =

- City: Saint-Georges, Quebec
- League: NAHL
- Operated: 1975–1976
- Home arena: Palais des Sports
- Colors: Orange, brown and white
- Head coach: Jocelyn Hardy

Franchise history
- 1975–1976: Beauce Jaros

Championships
- Regular season titles: 1 1975–76

The Beauce Jaros were a minor professional ice hockey team from Saint-Georges, Quebec, located in the "Beauce" region of the province.

The Jaros played one full season in the North American Hockey League during the 1975–76 NAHL season, and were the NAHL's regular season champions, but lost to the Philadelphia Firebirds in the Lockhart Cup finals.

Jocelyn 'Joe' Hardy was the team's player-coach, and also league most valuable player and top scorer in 1975–76, scoring 208 points. This made him the first professional player to score 200 points or more in a single season. The Jaros played another 30 games into the 1976–77 NAHL season before ceasing operations from December 22, 1976.

The Jaros' uniforms and logo were the basis for those worn by the fictional "Syracuse Bulldogs" in the 1977 film Slap Shot.
