= Rhode Island Eagles =

- City: Woonsocket, Rhode Island
- League: Eastern Hockey League
- Division: Central Division
- Operated: 1972-1973
- Home arena: Mount Saint Charles Arena
- Head coach: Larry Kish
- Affiliates: Chicago Cougars (WHA)

The Rhode Island Eagles are a defunct professional ice hockey team which played in the Eastern Hockey League during the 1972–73 season. Based in Woonsocket, Rhode Island, they played their home games in the Mount St. Charles Arena. The team was affiliated with the Chicago Cougars of the World Hockey Association.

Coached by Larry Kish, the Eagles failed to make the playoffs in their only season of play with a record of 32 wins, 35 losses, and 9 ties.
