= Long Island Cougars =

- City: Commack, New York
- League: North American Hockey League
- Operated: 1973–1975
- Home arena: Long Island Arena
- Colors: green and gold
- Owner: Benjamin Kasper

The Long Island Cougars were a minor league professional ice hockey team that played at the Long Island Arena in Commack, New York, from 1973 to 1975. The Cougars were a member of the North American Hockey League, and were runners up for the Lockhart Trophy to the Syracuse Blazers in the 1973–74 season.

== History ==
The Cougars replaced the long-running Long Island Ducks, who had folded earlier in 1973, along with the rest of the Eastern Hockey League (EHL).

Several refugees from the defunct EHL formed the North American Hockey League during the summer of 1973. The NAHL clubs quickly formed affiliation agreements to serve as farm clubs for teams in the upstart World Hockey Association, which was challenging the NHL for top talent and expansion markets during the 1970s. Long Island was offered a new franchise to stand in for the Ducks, and took both the nickname and green and gold color scheme from their parent club, the Chicago Cougars of the WHA.

During the NAHL's first season, the Cougars advanced to the Lockhart Cup championship series. Minor league hockey legend John Brophy, a longtime Ducks star and the Eastern League's all-time penalty minutes leader, was the Cougars' head coach. They lost in the finals to the Syracuse Blazers.

The Cougars played one final year on Long Island during the 1974–75 season, making the playoffs again despite a 29–40–5 record under new coach Ron Racette. In the spring of 1975 the Chicago Cougars of the WHA went out of business. In May of that year, Cougars owned Ben Kasper moved the team to Erie, Pennsylvania, where they were renamed the Erie Blades.

== Season-by-season results ==
Season-by-season results:

Season	League	Games	Won	Lost	Tied	Points	Winning %	Goals for	Goals against	Standing
1973–74	NAHL	74	35	36	3	73	0.493	310	277	Lost in Finals
1974–75	NAHL	74	29	40	5	63	0.426	271	280	Lost in round 2

== Notable players ==
- Kevin Ahearn who played on the 1972 US Olympic hockey team as well as for the New England Whalers of the WHA
- Jim Benzelock who played for both the Chicago Cougars and Quebec Nordiques of the WHA
- Curt Brackenbury who played for the Quebec Nordiques (WHA and NHL) as well as the Edmonton Oilers and St. Louis Blues of the NHL
- Brian Coates who played for the WHA Chicago Cougars, Indianapolis Racers and Cincinnati Stingers
- Rich Coutu who played for the WHA Chicago Cougars and Cincinnati Stingers
- Pat Donnelly who played for the WHA Cincinnati Stingers
- Michel Dubois who played for the WHA Indianapolis Racers and Quebec Nordiques
- Andre Gill who played for the NHL Boston Bruins and the WHA Chicago Cougars
- Don Gordon who played for the WHA Chicago Cougars and Los Angeles Sharks
- Joe Hardy who played for the NHL Oakland/California (Golden) Seals and the WHA Chicago Cougars, Indianapolis Racers and San Diego Mariners
- Dan Justin who played for the WHA Cincinnati Stingers
- Keith Kokkola who played for the WHA Denver Spurs/Ottawa Civics, Chicago Cougars and Birmingham Bulls
- Mark Lomenda who played for the WHA Chicago Cougars, Denver Spurs/Ottawa Civics, and Indianapolis Racers
- Peter Mara who played for the WHA Chicago Cougars, Denver Spurs/Ottawa Civics
- Larry Mavety who played for the WHA Chicago Cougars, Los Angeles Sharks, Toronto Toros, Indianapolis Racers, and Philadelphia Blazers
- Dunc McCallum who played for the NHL Pittsburgh Penguins, WHA Houston Aeros and Chicago Cougars
- Wally Olds who played on the 1972 US Olympic Hockey Team, WHA New York Raiders and Calgary Cowboys
- Dick Proceviat who played for the WHA Chicago Cougars and Indianapolis Racers,
- George Swarbrick who played for the NHL Seals, Penguins and Flyers
- Dave Walter who played for the WHA Chicago Cougars, and San Diego Mariners
- Jim Watson who played for the NHL Buffalo Sabres, Detroit Red Wings, WHA Chicago Cougars, Los Angeles Sharks and Quebec Nordiques

Additionally, Brian Glenwright and Dan Lodboa both played for the Chicago Cougars.
