= Broome Dusters =

Junior ice hockey team in New York state

- Founded: 1973
- League: North American Hockey League
- Based in: Binghamton, New York
- Home ground: Broome County Veterans Memorial Arena
- Colors: Gold and brown

The Broome Dusters were an ice hockey team in the North American Hockey League. They played in Binghamton, New York, United States at the Broome County Veterans Memorial Arena. The team logo was designed by Johnny Hart, artist of the comic strip B.C. and a Binghamton native.

== History ==
The Dusters played in the NAHL, which served as the inspiration for the movie Slap Shot, which includes a "Broome County" team. One scene in the film was specifically drawn from events that occurred in Binghamton. In the movie, the Hanson brothers wear black-rimmed, Coke-bottle eyeglasses, and in one game, get into a fight immediately after the opening faceoff. In reality, both Jeff and Steve Carlson of the Johnstown Jets wore similar glasses, and did get into a long fight right after an opening faceoff. Johnstown Coach Dick Roberge told the Johnstown Tribune-Democrat, "We got into Binghamton about two or three weeks before the playoffs. In the team warmup, we're out there and all the Binghamton players came out with the plastic glasses and big noses, every one of them, poking fun at the Carlson brothers. We went back in the dressing room and the boys said, 'Coach, as soon as that puck is dropped, we're pairing up.' We had one heckuva fight. They went about 30 minutes until everyone got tired. We met them again in the finals (1974–75) and beat them four straight."

When the NAHL folded in 1977, the team was replaced by the Binghamton Dusters of the American Hockey League who previously operated as the Providence Reds.

== Season-by-season results ==
Regular Season

Season	Games	Won	Lost	Tied	Points	Goals For	Goals Against	Standing
1973–74	74	28	41	5	61	274	352	6th, NAHL
1974–75	74	39	32	3	81	293	286	3rd, NAHL
1975–76	74	27	45	2	56	258	337	5th, West
1976–77	74	41	31	2	84	363	324	3rd, NAHL

Playoffs

Season	1st round	2nd round	Finals
1973–74	Out of Playoffs
1974–75	Mohawk Valley Comets??	??	L, 0–4, Johnstown
1975–76	Out of Playoffs
1976–77	W, Utica	L, Maine	--

== Team records ==
Goals: 87 Dave Staffen (Canada) (1976–77)
Assists: 124 Rod Bloomfield (Canada) (1976–77)
Points: 173 Rod Bloomfield (Canada) (1976–77)
Penalty Minutes: 273 Paul Stewart (United States) (1975–76)
GAA: 3.61 Rick Lemay (Canada) (1974–75)
SV%:
Career Goals: 187 Rod Bloomfield (Canada)
Career Assists: 310 Rod Bloomfield (Canada)
Career Points: 497 Rod Bloomfield (Canada)
Career Penalty Minutes: 505 Paul Stewart (United States)
Career Goaltending Wins:
Career Shutouts:
Career Games: 288 Rod Bloomfield (Canada)
