= Syracuse Blazers =

- City: Syracuse, New York
- League: EHL and NAHL
- Operated: 1967-1977
- Home arena: Oncenter War Memorial Arena

Championships
- Regular season titles: 3

The Syracuse Blazers were a minor league professional ice hockey team that played in the Onondaga County War Memorial and State Fair Coliseum in Syracuse, New York. The team played in the Eastern Hockey League from 1967 to 1973 and the North American Hockey League from 1973 to 1977.

The Blazers won the final Walker Cup championship of the Eastern Hockey League during the 1972–73 season, compiling a 63–9–4 regular season record and beating the Roanoke Valley Rebels 4 games to 2 in the Walker Cup finals. Ray Adduono was the leading scorer on the team (54 goals, 116 assists in 76 games) and five other players scored 100 points or more. Ron Ingram was the coach and general manager on the team.

The Blazers also won the first Lockhart Cup of the North American Hockey League, compiling a 54–16–4 record and sweeping the Long Island Cougars in the playoff finals. The Blazers won the NAHL championship again in 1976–77, sweeping the Maine Nordiques in the finals. The Blazers and the NAHL ceased operations before the start of the 1977–78 season.

Paul Newman's film Slap Shot was filmed in part at the Onondaga County War Memorial during the Blazers' 1976 season.

== Season-by-season results ==
Season	League	Games	Won	Lost	Tied	Points	Winning %	Goals for	Goals against	Result
1967–68	EHL	72	12	57	3	27	0.188	277	583	Out of playoffs
1968–69	EHL	72	9	59	4	22	0.153	178	401	Out of playoffs
1969–70	EHL	74	23	37	14	60	0.405	292	350	Lost in round 1
1970–71	EHL	74	36	30	8	80	0.541	302	284	Lost in round 1
1971–72	EHL	75	38	27	10	86	0.573	340	276	Lost in finals
1972–73	EHL	76	63	9	4	130	0.855	453	190	Won championship
1973–74	NAHL	74	54	16	4	112	0.757	359	219	Won championship
1974–75	NAHL	74	46	25	3	95	0.642	345	232	Lost in round 2
1975–76	NAHL	74	38	33	3	79	0.534	284	278	Lost in round 2
1976–77	NAHL	74	48	22	3	99	0.678	372	261	Won championship
