= Binghamton Dusters =

- City: Binghamton, New York
- League: American Hockey League
- Operated: 1977–1980
- Home arena: Broome County Veterans Memorial Arena
- Colors: Gold, black

Franchise history
- 1926–1976: Providence Reds
- 1976–1977: Rhode Island Reds
- 1977–1980: Binghamton Dusters
- 1980–1990: Binghamton Whalers
- 1990–1997: Binghamton Rangers
- 1997–2010: Hartford Wolf Pack
- 2010–2013: Connecticut Whale
- 2013–present: Hartford Wolf Pack

The Binghamton Dusters were an ice hockey team in the American Hockey League. They played in Binghamton, New York, USA at the Broome County Veterans Memorial Arena. The team logo was designed by Johnny Hart, artist of the comic strip "B.C." and a native of nearby Endicott N.Y. The team was known for using the Jim Croce song "Bad, Bad Leroy Brown" as their entrance theme.

== History ==
The Broome County Dusters originated as a North American Hockey League Team (NAHL) in its inaugural season in 1973-74.

The market was previously served by:

Broome Dusters of the NAHL (1973–1977)

The market was subsequently home to:

Binghamton Whalers of the American Hockey League (AHL) (1980–1990)
Binghamton Rangers of the AHL (1990–1997)
B.C. Icemen of the United Hockey League (UHL) (1997–2002)
Binghamton Senators of the AHL (2002–2017)
Binghamton Devils of the AHL (2017–2021)
Binghamton Black Bears of the Federal Prospects Hockey League (FPHL) (2021–present)

== Team records ==
=== Single season ===
- Goals: 87 Dave Staffen (Canada) (1976–77)
- Assists: 63 Joe Hardy (Canada) (1977–78)
- Points: 87 Joe Hardy (Canada) (1977–78)
- Penalty Minutes: 267 Rick Dorman (Canada) (1979–80)
- GAA:
- SV%:

=== Career ===
- Career Goals: 83 Richard Grenier (Canada)
- Career Assists: 98 Randy MacGregor (Canada)
- Career Points: 168 Randy MacGregor (Canada)
- Career Penalty Minutes: 394 Randy MacGregor (Canada)
- Career Goaltending Wins:
- Career Shutouts:
- Career Games: 213 Randy MacGregor (Canada)

== Season-by-season results ==
- Broome Dusters 1973–1977 (North American Hockey League)
- Broome Dusters 1977–1980 (American Hockey League)

=== Regular season ===
Season	Games	Won	Lost	Tied	Points	Goals for	Goals against	Standing
1973–74	74	28	41	5	61	274	352	6th, NAHL
1974–75	74	39	32	3	81	293	286	3rd, NAHL
1975–76	74	27	45	2	56	258	337	5th, West
1976–77	74	41	31	2	84	363	324	3rd, NAHL
1977–78	81	27	46	8	62	287	377	4th, North
1978–79	79	32	42	5	69	300	320	3rd, South
1979–80	80	24	49	7	55	268	334	5th, South

=== Playoffs ===
Season	1st round	2nd round	Finals
1973–74	Out of Playoffs		
1974–75	??	??	L, 0–4, Johnstown
1975–76	Out of Playoffs		
1976–77	W, Utica	L, Maine	—
1977–78	Out of Playoffs		
1978–79	W, 3–1, Hershey	L, 2–4, New Haven	—
1979–80	Out of Playoffs		
