= Cape Codders =

- City: South Yarmouth, Massachusetts
- League: NAHL
- Founded: 1974
- Folded: 1976
- Colors: White, Gold and Black
- Owner: William Harrison
- Head coach: Larry Kish

Franchise history
- 1972–1974: Cape Cod Cubs
- 1974–1976: Cape Codders

The Cape Codders were a professional ice hockey team that played at the Cape Cod Coliseum in South Yarmouth, Massachusetts.

== History ==
The Cubs started play as an expansion franchise in the Eastern Hockey League in 1972, the same year their home arena—the Cape Cod Coliseum—was constructed. An affiliate of the National Hockey League's Boston Bruins and New York Rangers, the Cubs were coached by former Bruin Bronco Horvath and they won the EHL's Central Division championship in their first year of play. When the EHL folded, the Cubs became founding members of the North American Hockey League for the 1973–74 season. A poor start on the ice and at the gate resulted in the firing of Horvath. Defenseman Mike De Marco replaced him on an interim basis until the team hired minor league defenseman Nick Polano of the Providence Reds to be player-coach for the remainder of the season. For 1974–75, the team changed its name, its affiliations and its coach, becoming the Cape Codders and signing working agreements with the World Hockey Association's New England Whalers and Cleveland Crusaders. Larry Kish, a former All-America defenseman at Providence College who previously had coached the Rhode Island Eagles and Suncoast Suns, was named coach. The franchise went out of business in 1977.

The Hyannis Presidents team in the movie Slap Shot was based on the Cape Cod Cubs, and featured one of its actual players, Mark Bousquet.
