= 1974–75 NAHL season =

Season of the North American Hockey League

The 1974–75 North American Hockey League season was the second season of the North American Hockey League. Eight teams participated in the regular season, and the Johnstown Jets were the league champions.

== Regular season ==
North American Hockey League	GP	W	L	OTL	GF	GA	Pts
Syracuse Blazers	74	46	25	3	345	232	95
Philadelphia Firebirds	74	40	31	3	311	288	83
Broome Dusters	74	39	32	3	293	286	81
Johnstown Jets	74	38	32	4	274	255	80
Cape Codders	74	32	38	4	319	310	68
Mohawk Valley Comets	74	31	38	5	312	346	67
Long Island Cougars	74	29	40	5	271	280	63
Maine Nordiques	74	27	46	1	266	394	55

== Lockhart Cup-Playoffs ==
=== First round ===
- Long Island Cougars - Philadelphia Firebirds 3:1 on series (2:4, 3:2, 5:2, 8:2)
- Broome County Dusters - Mohawk Valley Comets 3:1 on series (5:2, 3:5, 7:3, 2:1)
- Johnstown Jets - Cape Codders 3:1 on series (3:0, 4:6, 6:3, 4:2)

=== Semifinals ===
- Johnstown Jets - Syracuse Blazers 4:3 on series (3:4, 3:2, 5:3, 0:4, 4:6, 6:3, 5:4)
- Broome County Dusters - Long Island Cougars 4:3 on series (1:2 OT, 2:1, 4:6, 3:4, 3:1, 4:3 OT, 7:5)

=== Final ===
- Johnstown Jets - Broome County Dusters 4:0 on series (5:1, 7:4, 2:1, 6:2)
