= Maine Nordiques =

- Nickname: The Nords
- City: Lewiston, Maine
- League: NAHL
- Operated: 1973-1977
- Home arena: Central Maine Youth Center (capacity: 3,300)
- Colors: Red, White and Blue
- Owner(s): William Rocheleau, Jr. et al.
- Affiliate: Quebec Nordiques (WHA)

The Maine Nordiques were a professional ice hockey team that operated within the North American Hockey League from 1973 to 1977. They were based at the Central Maine Youth Center in Lewiston, Maine. The Nordiques served as a farm club for the Quebec Nordiques of the World Hockey Association.

== History ==
The team played for four seasons at Central Maine Youth Center, which had a seating capacity of just 2,800 fans.

The Nordiques were the Quebec Nordiques' top farm club, and were the only professional sports franchise in the state of Maine during the mid-1970s.

The club's all-time leading scorer was Paul Larose, who achieved 179 goals and 248 assists for the team between 1973 and 1977. Larose and Alan Globensky were the only two players to appear in all four seasons. Future National Hockey League players included goaltender Richard Brodeur and defenseman Paul Baxter.

Financial backers of the team included former Lewiston Mayor Bill Rocheleau, who led a group of local businesspeople who backed the Nordiques. Rocheleau also served as league president during the NAHL's final season in the winter of 1976–1977.

== Coaches ==
- Michel Harvey: 1973–74
- Michel Harvey and Jean-Charles Gravel: 1974–1975
- Bob Leduc: 1975–1976
- Jean-Charles Gravel: 1976–1977

== Season-by-season results ==
Season	League	Games	Won	Lost	Tied	Points	Winning %	Goals for	Goals against	Standing
1973–74	NAHL	74	45	26	3	93	0.628	398	309	Lost in round 1
1974–75	NAHL	74	27	46	1	55	0.372	266	394	Out of Playoffs
1975–76	NAHL	74	18	55	1	37	0.250	295	450	Lost in round 1
1976–77	NAHL	74	40	29	5	85	0.574	311	284	Lost in finals
