= 1976–77 NAHL season =

The 1976–77 North American Hockey League season was the fourth and final season of the North American Hockey League. Eight teams participated in the regular season, and the Syracuse Blazers were the league champions.

== Regular season ==
North American Hockey League	GP	W	L	OTL	GF	GA	Pts
Syracuse Blazers	73	48	22	3	372	261	99
Maine Nordiques	74	40	29	5	311	284	85
Broome Dusters	74	41	31	2	363	324	84
Philadelphia Firebirds	74	38	33	3	319	294	79
Erie Blades	74	37	33	4	257	251	78
Mohawk Valley Comets	74	29	42	3	316	387	61
Johnstown Jets	73	22	49	2	253	334	46
Beauce Jaros	30	6	22	2	109	165	14

== Lockhart Cup-Playoffs ==
Division Semifinals
1	Syracuse Blazers
Bye
4	Philadelphia Firebirds	1
5	Erie Blades	3
2	Maine Nordiques	3
7	Johnstown Jets	0
3	Broome Dusters	3
6	Mohawk Valley Comets	2

Division Final
1	Syracuse Blazers	4
5	Erie Blades	1
2	Maine Nordiques	4
3	Broome Dusters	1

Lockhart Cup Final
1	Syracuse Blazers	4
2	Maine Nordiques	0
