= 1975–76 NAHL season =

The 1975–76 North American Hockey League season was the third season of the North American Hockey League. 10 teams participated in the regular season, and the Philadelphia Firebirds were the league champions.

== Regular season ==
East Division	GP	W	L	OTL	GF	GA	Pts
Beauce Jaros	74	54	18	2	462	306	110
Syracuse Blazers	74	38	33	3	284	278	79
Mohawk Valley Comets	74	30	40	4	306	354	64
Cape Codders	52	24	25	3	244	227	51
Maine Nordiques	74	18	55	1	295	450	37

West Division	GP	W	L	OTL	GF	GA	Pts
Johnstown Jets	74	47	25	2	346	257	96
Philadelphia Firebirds	74	45	29	0	373	319	90
Erie Blades	74	37	36	1	310	298	75
Buffalo Norsemen	74	30	44	0	323	375	60
Broome Dusters	74	27	45	2	258	337	56

== Lockhart Cup-Playoffs ==
Division Semifinals
E1	Beauce Jaros	3
E5	Maine Nordiques	1
East Division
E2	Syracuse Blazers	3
E3	Mohawk Valley Comets	1
W1	Johnstown Jets	3
W4	Buffalo Norsemen	2
West Division
W2	Philadelphia Firebirds	3
W3	Erie Blades	2

Division Final
E1	Beauce Jaros	4
E2	Syracuse Blazers	0
W1	Johnstown Jets	1
W2	Philadelphia Firebirds	4

Lockhart Cup Final
E1	Beauce Jaros	2
W2	Philadelphia Firebirds	4
