= Mohawk Valley Comets =

- City: Utica, New York
- League: North American Hockey League
- Division: None (1973-75); East (1975-77)
- Founded: 1973
- Operated: 1973-77
- Home arena: Utica Memorial Auditorium
- General manager: Brian Conacher (1974-76)
- Head coach: Brian Conacher (1974-75); Ted McCaskill (1975-76); Bob Woytowich (1976-77); Ian Anderson (1977)
- Affiliates: Indianapolis Racers (1974-77); Toronto Toros (1974-75)

Franchise history
- 1927–1948: Clinton Hockey Club
- 1949–1973: Clinton Comets
- 1973–1977: Mohawk Valley Comets

The Mohawk Valley Comets are a former professional ice hockey team based in Utica, New York. They were a member of the North American Hockey League from 1973 to 1977.

== Season-by-season results ==
Season	Games	Won	Lost	Tied	Points	GF	GA	PIM	Overall	Playoffs
1973–74	74	20	52	2	42	240	385	--	7th of 7	Did not qualify
1974–75	74	31	38	5	67	312	345	1151	6th of 8	Lost In 1st round
1975–76	74	30	40	4	64	306	354	1440	3rd of 5 (East)	Lost In Round 1
1976–77	74	29	42	3	61	316	387	790	6th of 8	Lost In Round 1
4 seasons	296	110	172	14	234	1174	1471	3381		3 playoff appearances
