= North American Hockey League (1973–1977) =

Minor professional hockey league

- Founded: 1973
- Folded: 1977
- No. of teams: 7 to 10
- Country: United States & Canada
- Most titles: Syracuse Blazers (2)

The North American Hockey League (NAHL) was a low-level minor professional ice hockey league that existed from 1973 to 1977. Several of the NAHL teams operated as developmental ("farm") teams for World Hockey Association franchises. The NAHL was one of two leagues, along with the Southern Hockey League, that were formed after the Eastern Hockey League ceased operations in 1973. The Lockhart Cup was the league's championship trophy. With the loss of a number of franchises and financial struggles, the NAHL folded in September 1977.

== Teams ==
Team name	Years	Seasons	City
Beauce Jaros	1975–1976	2	Saint-Georges, Quebec
Broome Dusters	1973–1977	4	Binghamton, New York
Buffalo Norsemen	1975–1976	1	North Tonawanda, New York
Cape Cod Cubs / Cape Codders	1973–1976	3	South Yarmouth, Massachusetts
Erie Blades	1975–1977	2	Erie, Pennsylvania
Johnstown Jets	1973–1977	4	Johnstown, Pennsylvania
Long Island Cougars	1973–1975	2	Commack, New York
Maine Nordiques	1973–1977	4	Lewiston, Maine
Mohawk Valley Comets	1973–1977	4	Utica, New York
Philadelphia Firebirds	1974–1977	3	Philadelphia, Pennsylvania
Syracuse Blazers	1973–1977	4	Syracuse, New York

== Lockhart Cup ==
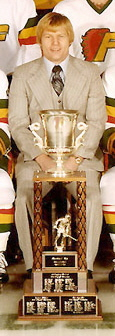
Gregg Pilling and the Lockhart Cup in 1976

The championship trophy of the North American Hockey League was named the Lockhart Cup in honor of Tommy Lockhart, founder of the Eastern Hockey League. The trophy was last awarded on April 10, 1977, to the Syracuse Blazers, and has since gone missing. The Hockey Hall of Fame stated that the Lockhart Cup is one of "about three historical trophies that have disappeared". Its last known whereabouts was reported to be in the basement of Danny Belisle, the coach of the Blazers in the 1976–77 season.

Season	Champion	Runner-up
1973–74	Syracuse Blazers	Long Island Cougars
1974–75	Johnstown Jets	Broome Dusters
1975–76	Philadelphia Firebirds	Beauce Jaros
1976–77	Syracuse Blazers	Maine Nordiques

== League dissolves ==
The league consisted of five teams when it folded in September 1977 amid financial struggles, releasing all players from their contracts. The Syracuse Blazers folded after winning what would be the last league championship. The league discussed continuing with five teams, but the Mohawk Valley Comets needed financial support from the other teams to continue. The other teams would have had to post $50,000 to keep the league alive, but the Broome Dusters and Philadelphia Blazers declined.

The Firebirds joined the American Hockey League (AHL) as an expansion team, and the Dusters' owners purchased the Providence Reds and relocated them as the Binghamton Dusters.

== Legacy in film ==
The league served as the inspiration for the film Slap Shot. Ned Dowd, who played for the Johnstown Jets, was the brother of the film's screenwriter, Nancy Dowd. Ned played for Johnstown during a season where the team was for sale, when his sister came to live in Johnstown and was inspired to write the screenplay. The film contains references to "Syracuse" and "Broome County", which were teams in the NAHL. Some of the incidents depicted actually occurred in actual NAHL games.
