= List of Minnesota Fighting Saints players =

This is a list of players who played at least one game for the Minnesota Fighting Saints of the World Hockey Association from 1972–73 to 1975–76, or for the second version of the team during the 1976–77 season. Players who played for both versions of the team have an asterisk (*) after their name while players who only played for the second version of the team have two asterisks (**) after their name.

== A ==
Ray Adduono**, Mike Antonovich*, John Arbour*,

== B ==
Terry Ball, Henry Boucha, Bruce Boudreau, Bob Boyd, Curt Brackenbury, Ron Busniuk, Bill Butters*,

== C ==
Steve Cardwell, Jack Carlson*, Jeff Carlson, Steve Carlson*, Keith Christiansen, Ray Clearwater**, Wayne Connelly, Mike Curran*,

== D ==
Butch Deadmarsh**,

== F ==
Craig Falkman,

== G ==
Gord Gallant*, Gary Gambucci, John Garrett, Bill Goldthorpe, Danny Gruen**,

== H ==
Ted Hampson, David Hanson**, Murray Heatley, Paul Holmgren, Fran Huck,

== J ==
Jim Johnson,

== K ==
Dave Keon*, Bill Klatt, George Konik,

== L ==
Barry Legge**, Louis Levasseur*, Leonard Lilyholm,

== M ==
Bob MacMillan, Jack McCartan, Al McDonough**, Ray McKay**, John McKenzie*, Mike McMahon, Tom Milani**, Perry Miller, George Morrison,

== O ==
Danny O'Shea, Kevin O'Shea, Gerry Odrowski, Francois Ouimet,

== P ==
Dick Paradise, Craig Patrick**, Mel Pearson,

== R ==
Joe Robertson, Terry Ryan, Blaine Rydman,

== S ==
Frank Sanders, Craig Sarner, Rick Smith, Fred Speck, John Stewart**,

== T ==
Don Tannahill, Jean Tetreault,

== W ==
Mike Walton, Rob Walton, Ron Ward**, Pat Westrum*, Carl Wetzel,

== Y ==
Bill Young,

== Z ==
Jerry Zrymiak*,
