= Rydman =

Rydman is a surname. Notable people with the surname include:

- Arvid Rydman (1884–1953), Finnish gymnast, competed in the 1912 Summer Olympics
- Blaine Rydman (born 1949), Canadian ice hockey player
- Fredrik Rydman (born 1974), Swedish dancer
- Tore Rydman (1914–2003), Swedish curler
- Wille Rydman (born 1986), Finnish politician
