= Minnesota Golden Gophers men's ice hockey =

Men's ice hockey team of the University of Minnesota

- Current season
- University: University of Minnesota
- Conference: Big Ten
- First season: 1921–22
- Head coach: Brett Larson; 1st season, 0–0–0
- Assistant coaches: Steve Miller; Ben Gordon; Brennan Poderzay
- Arena: 3M Arena at Mariucci; Minneapolis, Minnesota
- Student section: The Ice Box
- Colors: Maroon and gold
- Fight song: Minnesota Rouser
- Mascot: Goldy Gopher

NCAA tournament champions
- 1974, 1976, 1979, 2002, 2003

NCAA tournament runner-up
- 1953, 1954, 1971, 1975, 1981, 1989, 2014, 2023

NCAA tournament Frozen Four
- 1953, 1954, 1961, 1971, 1974, 1975, 1976, 1979, 1981, 1983, 1986, 1987, 1988, 1989, 1994, 1995, 2002, 2003, 2005, 2012, 2014, 2022, 2023

NCAA tournament appearances
- 1953, 1954, 1961, 1971, 1974, 1975, 1976, 1979, 1980, 1981, 1983, 1985, 1986, 1987, 1988, 1989, 1990, 1991, 1992, 1993, 1994, 1995, 1996, 1997, 2001, 2002, 2003, 2004, 2005, 2006, 2007, 2008, 2012, 2013, 2014, 2015, 2017, 2021, 2022, 2023, 2024, 2025

Conference tournament champions
- WCHA: 1961, 1971, 1974, 1975, 1976, 1979, 1980, 1981, 1993, 1994, 1996, 2003, 2004, 2007; Big Ten: 1967, 2015, 2021

Conference regular season champions
- WCHA: 1953, 1954, 1970, 1975, 1981, 1983, 1988, 1989, 1992, 1997, 2006, 2007, 2012, 2013; Big Ten: 1923, 1924, 1926, 1927, 1928, 1929, 1932, 1933, 1934, 1936, 1938, 1939, 1940, 1941, 1960, 1963, 1965, 1966, 1970, 1974, 1975, 1979, 1980, 1981, 2014, 2015, 2016, 2017, 2022, 2023, 2025 (Note: Despite their members belonging to other conferences, the Big Ten still awarded regular season conference championships from 1923 to 1943 and 1959 to 1981, and held a conference tournament from 1967 to 1969. In 2013, the Big Ten began officially sponsoring hockey again.)

Current uniform

The Minnesota Golden Gophers men's ice hockey team is the college ice hockey team at the Twin Cities campus of the University of Minnesota. They are members of the Big Ten Conference and compete in National Collegiate Athletic Association (NCAA) Division I ice hockey. The Golden Gophers are one of the most prominent and storied programs in college hockey, having made 41 NCAA Tournament appearances and 23 trips to the Frozen Four. They have won five NCAA national championships, in 1974, 1976, 1979, 2002 and 2003. The team also shared the 1929 National Intercollegiate Athletic Association championship with Yale, and captured the national Amateur Athletic Union (AAU) championship for amateur hockey in 1940.

The Gophers were most recently led by Bob Motzko, who served as head coach between 2018 and 2026, having previously served as assistant coach on the 2002 and 2003 national championship teams. They have played at Mariucci Arena in Minneapolis since 1993. The team's main historical rivalries are with the University of Wisconsin and the University of North Dakota, although several other schools claim Minnesota as their archrival.

For much of the team's history, there has been a strong emphasis on recruiting native Minnesotan high school and junior hockey players, as opposed to out-of-state, Canadian, or European players. This helped high school ice hockey grow in Minnesota, particularly starting with Hall of Famer John Mariucci, who refused to recruit players from Canada. Minnesota high school ice hockey programs grew from 26 in 1945 to over 150 in 1980. Hall of Famer and hockey legend Herb Brooks, who coached the Golden Gophers to three national championships in the 1970s, famously drew on Minnesota talent for his 1980 Miracle on Ice gold medal Olympic team, which included 9 of his former Golden Gophers players. Head coach Doug Woog championed home-grown talent even more, only recruiting Minnesota players in the late 1980s and 1990s. While current rosters occasionally feature players from outside the state, the team continues to heavily recruit Minnesota hockey players to the present day.

== History ==
=== Early history 1895–1952 ===
According to records, the first intercollegiate hockey team at the University of Minnesota was organized in 1895 by Dr. Herbert A. Parkyn, a Toronto native who also played on the school's football team. An early Minnesota team played the Winnipeg Seven at the now demolished Athletic Park in downtown Minneapolis. They lost 11–3.

In 1900 George Northrup, Paul Joslyn, and A.R. Gibbons headed a committee to create an official varsity hockey club at the U. Although there was some effort to get Northrop Field flooded, it was ultimately decided to play on Como Lake in St. Paul. Although the 1903 season saw the first scheduled organized competitions for Minnesota hockey, ultimately this season would be the last organized hockey season for almost two decades. In 1910 efforts were made to revive competition and outreach to the University of Chicago and University of Wisconsin, other members of the Big Ten Conference, but these plans never materialized.

In January 1914 the Minnesota Board of Regents voted to fund a hockey team. However the University Athletic Board did not officially recognize this team as a varsity team. At this time, a number of fraternity squads existed and other intramural ice hockey competitions were taking place. Professor OS Zelner worked to organize some of this competition. There was also some interest in women's hockey competition.

In 1920–1921, a hockey team again skated representing the University of Minnesota. W. Beaupre Eldredge of St. Paul, a student and club player at the time, was very instrumental in organizing the team, promoting the team to the University Board of Regents to become an official varsity sport. For 1921–1922 season the University Athletic Board of Control decided to finally give ice hockey varsity status on January 9, 1922, answering a petition organized by Merle "Frenchy" DeForest, the president of a new booster organization for the sport, which itself grew out of enthusiasm for hockey among the interfraternal league. During this season, the team finished with a 7–3 record, led by head coach I.D. MacDonald and captain Chester “Chet” Bros. Other members of the 1921–22 team include center Paul Swanson and wingman Frank R. Pond, who were named captains for the following seasons, Swanson in 1922–23 and Pond in 1923–24. DeForest, Swanson and Pond were all members of Phi Sigma Kappa fraternity, while Bros was a member of Delta Tau Delta.

For the 1923–1924 season Danish Canadian Emil Iverson assumed the role as head coach. During Iverson's first season as coach the team attained a record of 13–1–0. The team played their games at Minneapolis Arena starting in 1924–1925 season. Such players as Chuck McCabe, Joel Brown, John H. Peterson were accorded All-American honors during this era. Iverson's coaching tenure culminated in Minnesota sharing the National Intercollegiate Athletic Association hockey championship with Yale. Following the 1929–1930 season Emil Iverson accepted a position as coach of the Chicago Blackhawks

Frank Pond, former team captain, became coach in 1930 after the departure of Emil Iverson. The team's Rookie of the Year award is named in his honor.

=== Doc Romnes era (1947–52) ===
During Romnes's second year, the NCAA sponsored the first Division I Men's hockey tournament. Minnesota did not qualify for the four team playoff during his coaching tenure.

=== John Mariucci era (1952–66) ===
In the 1952 season, John Mariucci led the Gophers to the National Championship game, with a 23–6 record, after going 13–13 the year before.

Mariucci was a major contributor to the philosophy of stacking the team with Minnesota talent. Even while other programs brought in older and bigger Canadian prospects, Mariucci thoroughly believed in growing the game in Minnesota, from the ground up. He held coaching clinics, and opened ice rinks in numerous Minnesota towns, contributing to team pride and the production of hockey talent in Minnesota.

George Nagobads was hired as the team's physician in 1958, and remained with the team until 1992.

=== Glen Sonmor era (1966–71) ===
After coaching one season at Ohio State, Glen Sonmor became the head coach of the Gophers in 1966. Sonmor's Gophers started off slowly, finishing 8th, 5th, and 5th in the WCHA during Sonmor's first 3 seasons behind the bench. Things turned around for the Gophers in the 1969–70 season, as Sonmor led the team to its first WCHA Championship in 16 seasons, finishing with a 21–12–0 record. In the process, Sonmor was named the WCHA Coach of the Year.

The following season, the Gophers ended a 10-year NCAA Tournament drought, along with capturing a WCHA Tournament Championship. Sonmor led the Gophers to the NCAA Championship game, beating Harvard 6–5 in the first round. The Gophers lost to Boston University in the Championship game, by a score of 4–2.

During Sonmor's rather short tenure as Minnesota's head coach, the team saw attendance rise 60 percent. Sonmor finished his career with a 78–80–6 record, and coached 3 All Americans: Gary Gambucci (1968), Murray McLachlan (1970), and Wally Olds (1970). Sonmor left the Gophers after the 1971 season, to coach the Minnesota Fighting Saints of the World Hockey Association. Sonmor returned later to be the radio analyst for the Gophers on WCCO-AM.

=== Brad Buetow era (1979–85) ===
Brad Buetow was head coach from 1979 to 1985. At the start of the 1984–85 season, he hired Thomas "Chico" Adrahtas as an assistant coach. The team won 31 games, came in second in the WCHA, and made the NCAA tournament. Adrahtas has been accused by a number of former players of coercing them into oral sex. Former NHL goaltender Frank Pietrangelo has accused Adrahtas of sexually abusing him during his time as a student-athlete at the University of Minnesota in a lawsuit. The United States Center for SafeSport investigated, and issued its decision declaring that Adrahtas was permanently ineligible "from participating, in any capacity, in any event, program, activity, or competition authorized by, organized by, or under the auspices of the United States Olympic & Paralympic Committee (USOPC), the National Governing Bodies recognized by the USOPC, a Local Affiliated Organization as defined by the Code, or any High Performance Management Organization (HPMO), or at a facility under the jurisdiction of the same."

== Championships ==
=== National Championships ===
Year	Champion	Score	Runner-up	City	Arena
1974	Minnesota	4–3	Michigan Tech	Boston, MA	Boston Garden
1976	Minnesota	6–4	Michigan Tech	Denver, CO	University of Denver Arena
1979	Minnesota	4–3	North Dakota	Detroit, MI	Olympia Stadium
2002	Minnesota	4–3 (OT)	Maine	St. Paul, MN	Xcel Energy Center
2003	Minnesota	5–1	New Hampshire	Buffalo, NY	HSBC Arena

Runners-up in 1953, 1954, 1971, 1975, 1981, 1989, 2014, and 2023.

=== Trophies ===
Big Ten Regular Season Championship Trophy:

- 2013–14, 2014–15, 2015–16, 2016–17, 2021–22, 2022–23

Big Ten Tournament Championship Trophy:

- 2015, 2021

MacNaughton Cup 13 times as WCHA regular season champions:

- 1952–53, 1953–54, 1969–70, 1974–75, 1980–81, 1987–88, 1988–89, 1991–92, 1996–97, 2005–06, 2006–07, 2011–12, 2012–13

Broadmoor Trophy once as WCHA regular season champions (1983) and six times as the WCHA Tournament champions:

- 1983, 1993, 1994, 1996, 2003, 2004, 2007

North Star College Cup, the annual intrastate tournament vs. Minnesota-Duluth, Minnesota State, St. Cloud State, and Bemidji State:

- 2014

Mariucci Classic Champions 14 times:

- 1991, 1995, 1996, 1999, 2000, 2001, 2002, 2003, 2004, 2005, 2006, 2009, 2012, 2016

Ice Breaker Invitational Champions three times:

- 2007, 2013, 2014

Mariucci-Bessone Coaches Trophy for series vs. Michigan State, started in 1993 (Minnesota leads series 13–5–5):

- 1993, 1994, 1995, 1996, 1998, 2003, 2004, 2006, 2009, 2012, 2013–14, 2014–15, 2015–16

Mariucci-Renfrew Coaches Trophy for series vs. Michigan, started in 1993 (Minnesota leads series: 10–9–2):

- 1994, 1995, 1999, 2001, 2003, 2004, 2005, 2006, 2010, 2013-14

From 1959 to 1981, an annual Big Ten champion was crowned for the best record in regular season games among active Big Ten members, 10 times:

- 1959–60, 1962–63, 1964–65, 1965–66, 1969–70, 1973–74, 1974–75, 1978–79, 1979–80, 1980–81

== Season-by-season results ==
Source:

== Records by opponent ==
Big Ten Conference opponents

Opponent	GP	W-L-T	Win %	First meeting	Last meeting
Michigan	302	157-136–19	0.555	2–0 W January 22, 1923	2-0 W December 7, 2024
Michigan State	204	132–53–19	0.714	2–0 W February 19, 1926	3-3 T January 25, 2025
Notre Dame	78	44–28–6	0.611	2–0 W February 9, 1925	3-4 L (OT); January 18, 2025
Ohio State	58	42–10–6	0.808	10–1 W December 26, 1968	6–1 W January 11, 2025
Penn State	46	28–17–1	0.622	3–2 W January 13, 2014	1–0 W November 1, 2024
Wisconsin	312	185–102–25	0.645	3–0 W January 20, 1922	4-1 W February 1, 2025

Former WCHA opponents

Opponent	GP	W-L-T	Win %	First meeting	Last meeting
Alaska-Anchorage; WCHA	85	58–19–8	0.729	5–1 W December 21, 1986	6–0 W October 7, 2016
Bemidji State; WCHA	27	23–3–1	0.885	9–3 W October 14, 2000	1–3 L November 16, 2024
Colorado College; NCHC	260	164-88–8	0.651	8–3 W February 28, 1947	6–2 W January 8, 2024
Denver; NCHC	179	94–73–12	0.560	10–4 W January 1, 1951	5–1 W March 2, 2013
Michigan Tech; WCHA	267	174–78–15	0.680	3–3 T February 13, 1922	3–2 W October 20, 2012
Minnesota-Duluth; NCHC	240	138–83–19	0.624	14–2 W December 13, 1952	5-1 W October 19, 2024
Minnesota State; WCHA	60	38–17–6	0.704	6–2 W January 2, 1998	2-3 L October 8, 2022
Nebraska-Omaha; NCHC	9	5–4–0	0.556	7–3 W October 11, 2003	1-2 L October 12, 2024
North Dakota; NCHC	302	150–136–16	0.525	6–1 W February 4, 1930	1–2 L October 21, 2023
Northern Michigan; WCHA	54	29–18–7	0.602	3–4 L March 22, 1980	2–4 L January 3, 2010
St. Cloud State; NCHC	106	59–35–12	0.628	6–0 W October 3, 1987	4–1 W March 26, 2023

Major non-conference opponents

Opponent	GP	W-L-T	Win %	First meeting	Last meeting
Arizona State; Independent	6	7–1–0	0.875	5-1 W March 1, 2019	5–6 L November 26, 2022
Boston College; Hockey East	33	18–12–3	0.591	14–1 W March 11, 1954	6–2 W November 28, 2014
Boston University; Hockey East	27	13–12–2	0.520	4–2 W December 20, 1963	6–2 W April 6, 2023
Harvard; ECAC	34	24–7–0	0.774	6–7 L January 14, 1932	2-1 W (OT); November 18, 2017
Maine; Hockey East	23	10–13–0	0.435	4–2 W October 26, 1984	1–3 L October 6, 2006
New Hampshire; Hockey East	18	14–2–2	0.833	4–3 W March 22, 1979	3–2 W October 12, 2013
Providence; Hockey East	18	13–4–1	0.750	5–4 W December 27, 1962	6–1 W December 29, 2001
Yale; ECAC	20	13–7–0	0.650	0–2 L December 21, 1934	2–3 L March 29, 2013

== Rivalries ==
The Gophers have historic rivalries with some of the top men's ice hockey programs in the NCAA, including both in-state as well as out of state rivalries.

Out of state rivalries include the University of Wisconsin Badgers and the University of North Dakota Fighting Hawks. The Gophers' rivalry against the Badgers is part of the annual "Border Battle," in which both universities keep a tallied score of all athletic competitions against one another.

The Gophers were engaged in one of the most notorious rivalries in college hockey history with the Boston University Terriers for over 30 years from 1963 to 1995. The rivalry came to its peak during the 1976 NCAA Championship Semi-Final when a bench-clearing brawl occurred only 70 seconds into the game, delaying it for nearly 30 minutes. The Gophers would go on to win the game 4–2 and subsequently, the Championship. A number of players on both teams would end up playing together for the gold medal-winning Miracle on Ice Team USA during the 1980 Winter Olympics, coached by Minnesota Head Coach Herb Brooks. The rivalry began its decline in 1984, when the Gophers would become members of the Western Collegiate Hockey Association and the Terriers the Hockey East Division, resulting in a steep decline in games against one another.

Due to the fact the State of Minnesota has six NCAA Division I hockey programs, the Gophers naturally share a rivalry with four of them: University of Minnesota-Duluth Bulldogs, St. Cloud State University Huskies, Minnesota State University, Mankato Mavericks and Bemidji State University Beavers. Four of the six programs (excluding Bemidji State and St. Thomas) participated in the inaugural North Star College Cup tournament during the 2013–2014 Ice Hockey Season.

== Players ==
=== Current roster ===
As of September 1, 2025.

No.	Nat.	Player	Class	Pos	Height	Weight	DoB	Hometown	Previous team	NHL rights
3	(United States)	Tate Pritchard	Freshman	F	6' 2" (1.88 m)	192 lb (87 kg)	2004-11-19	Chanhassen, Minnesota	Sioux City Musketeers (USHL)	—
4	(United States)	John Whipple	Sophomore	D	6' 1" (1.85 m)	194 lb (88 kg)	2006-01-20	Morristown, New Jersey	USNTDP (USHL)	DET, 144th overall 2024
5	(United States)	Jacob Rombach	Freshman	D	6' 6" (1.98 m)	209 lb (95 kg)	2007-04-01	Blaine, Minnesota	Lincoln Stars (USHL)	NSH, 35th overall 2025
7	(United States)	Beckett Hendrickson	Sophomore	F	6' 2" (1.88 m)	174 lb (79 kg)	2005-06-24	Minnetonka, Minnesota	Dubuque Fighting Saints (USHL)	BOS, 124th overall 2023
9	(United States)	August Falloon	Sophomore	F	6' 2" (1.88 m)	201 lb (91 kg)	2004-02-23	St. Cloud, Minnesota	Tri-City Storm (USHL)	—
11	(United States)	Tanner Ludtke	Junior	F	6' 0" (1.83 m)	180 lb (82 kg)	2004-11-27	Elko, Minnesota	Omaha (NCHC)	UTA, 81st overall 2023
15	(United States)	Max Rud	Junior	D	6' 3" (1.91 m)	185 lb (84 kg)	2003-09-17	St. Cloud, Minnesota	Sioux Falls Stampede (USHL)	—
17	(United States)	Brody Lamb	Senior	F	6' 1" (1.85 m)	175 lb (79 kg)	2003-08-30	Byron, Minnesota	Green Bay Gamblers (USHL)	NYR, 104th overall 2021
18	(United States)	L. J. Mooney	Freshman	F	5' 7" (1.7 m)	157 lb (71 kg)	2007-03-08	West Mifflin, Pennsylvania	USNTDP (USHL)	MTL, 113th overall 2025
19	(United States)	John Mittelstadt	Senior	F	5' 9" (1.75 m)	175 lb (79 kg)	2001-10-27	Eden Prairie, Minnesota	Green Bay Gamblers (USHL)	—
20	(United States)	Luke Mittelstadt	Senior	D	5' 11" (1.8 m)	175 lb (79 kg)	2003-01-22	Eden Prairie, Minnesota	Madison Capitols (USHL)	MTL, 197th overall 2023
22	(United States)	Cal Thomas	Senior	D	6' 1" (1.85 m)	205 lb (93 kg)	2003-05-08	Maple Grove, Minnesota	Chicago Steel (USHL)	ARI, 171st overall 2021
23	(United States)	Jimmy Clark	Junior	F	6' 0" (1.83 m)	170 lb (77 kg)	2004-09-24	Edina, Minnesota	Green Bay Gamblers (USHL)	MIN, 213th overall 2023
24	(Canada)	Finn McLaughlin	Freshman	D	6' 2" (1.88 m)	207 lb (94 kg)	2006-02-28	Canmore, Alberta	Muskegon Lumberjacks (USHL)	—
27	(United States)	Javon Moore	Freshman	F	6' 4" (1.93 m)	203 lb (92 kg)	2005-12-07	Minnetonka, Minnesota	Sioux Falls Stampede (USHL)	OTT, 112th overall 2024
29	(Canada)	Nathan Airey	Junior	G	6' 3" (1.91 m)	190 lb (86 kg)	2003-04-24	Cochrane, Alberta	Cranbrook Bucks (BCHL)	—
30	(United States)	Zach Wiese	Senior	G	5' 10" (1.78 m)	210 lb (95 kg)	2002-01-02	Owatonna, Minnesota	Rochester Grizzlies (NA3HL)	—
31	(United States)	Luca Di Pasquo	Junior	G	6' 0" (1.83 m)	201 lb (91 kg)	2003-09-24	Livonia, Michigan	Michigan State (Big Ten)	—
33	(United States)	Axel Begley	Junior	D	6' 2" (1.88 m)	200 lb (91 kg)	2003-12-16	Mahtomedi, Minnesota	Wisconsin Windigo (NAHL)	—
34	(United States)	Graham Harris	Sophomore	F	6' 0" (1.83 m)	185 lb (84 kg)	2003-06-04	Excelsior, Minnesota	Augsburg (MIAC)	—
44	(United States)	Teddy Townsend	Freshman	F	5' 10" (1.78 m)	174 lb (79 kg)	2005-09-02	Eden Prairie, Minnesota	Waterloo Black Hawks (USHL)	—
55	(United States)	Leo Gruba	Sophomore	D	6' 2" (1.88 m)	209 lb (95 kg)	2003-12-14	Lake Elmo, Minnesota	Fargo Force (USHL)	—
72	(Sweden)	Erik Påhlsson	Sophomore	F	6' 1" (1.85 m)	185 lb (84 kg)	2004-04-09	Landskrona, Sweden	Dubuque Fighting Saints (USHL)	NSH, 213th overall 2024
74	(United States)	Brodie Ziemer	Sophomore	F	5' 11" (1.8 m)	196 lb (89 kg)	2006-02-22	Carver, Minnesota	USNTDP (USHL)	BUF, 71st overall 2024
79	(United States)	Mason Moe	Freshman	F	6' 2" (1.88 m)	192 lb (87 kg)	2007-03-26	Eden Prairie, Minnesota	USNTDP (USHL)	NJD, 90th overall 2025

=== Olympians ===
This is a list of Minnesota alumni were a part of an Olympic team.

Name	Position	Minnesota Tenure	Team	Year	Finish
Philip LaBatte	Defenseman	1931–1934	(United States) USA	1936	Bronze
Allan Opsahl	Defenseman	1943–1947	(United States) USA	1948	DQ†
Allen Van	Defenseman	1944–1945	(United States) USA	1952	Silver
Rube Bjorkman	Forward	1948–1951	(United States) USA	1952	Silver
Jim Sedin	Defenseman	1948–1951	(United States) USA	1952	Silver
Ken Yackel	Right Wing	1951–1956	(United States) USA	1952	Silver
Wendell R. Anderson	Defenseman	1951–1954	(United States) USA	1956	Silver
Gene Campbell	Center	1951–1954	(United States) USA	1956	Silver
Richard Dougherty	Forward	1951–1954	(United States) USA	1956	Silver
John Petroske	Defenseman	1953–1957	(United States) USA	1956	Silver
Richard Meredith	Forward	1951–1954	(United States) USA	1956, 1960	Silver, Gold
John Mayasich	Center/Defenseman	1951–1955	(United States) USA	1956, 1960	Silver, Gold
Jack McCartan	Goaltender	1955–1958	(United States) USA	1960	Gold
Bill Christian	Forward	1956–1957	(United States) USA	1960, 1964	Gold, 5th
Wayne Meredith	Defenseman	1958–1962	(United States) USA	1964	5th
David Brooks	Center	1960–1963	(United States) USA	1964	5th
Jake McCoy	Defenseman	1961–1963	(United States) USA	1964	5th
Gary Schmalzbauer	Left Wing	1960–1963	(United States) USA	1964	5th
Jim Westby	Defenseman	1957–1958, 1961–1963	(United States) USA	1964	5th
Herb Brooks	Forward/Defenseman	1956–1959	(United States) USA	1964, 1968	5th, 6th
Len Lilyholm	Center	1956–1959	(United States) USA	1968	6th
Lou Nanne	Defenseman	1960–1963	(United States) USA	1968	6th
Larry Stordahl	Forward	1961–1965	(United States) USA	1968	6th
Craig Falkman	Right Wing	1962–1965	(United States) USA	1968	6th
Jack Dale	Center	1964–1967	(United States) USA	1968	6th
Bruce McIntosh	Defenseman	1968–1971	(United States) USA	1972	Silver
Wally Olds	Defenseman	1968–1971	(United States) USA	1972	Silver
Frank Sanders	Defenseman	1968–1971	(United States) USA	1972	Silver
Craig Sarner	Center/Left Wing	1968–1971	(United States) USA	1972	Silver
Rob Harris	Forward	1971–1975	(United States) USA	1976	5th
Buzz Schneider	Center/Left Wing	1972–1975	(United States) USA	1976, 1980	5th, Gold
Bill Baker	Defenseman	1975–1979	(United States) USA	1980	Gold
Steve Janaszak	Goaltender	1975–1979	(United States) USA	1980	Gold
Steve Christoff	Center	1976–1979	(United States) USA	1980	Gold
Rob McClanahan	Left Wing	1976–1979	(United States) USA	1980	Gold
Eric Strobel	Right Wing	1976–1979	(United States) USA	1980	Gold
Mike Ramsey	Defenseman	1978–1979	(United States) USA	1980	Gold
Neal Broten	Center	1978–1979, 1980–1981	(United States) USA	1980	Gold
Phil Verchota	Left Wing	1975–1979	(United States) USA	1980, 1984	Gold, 7th
Scott Bjugstad	Right Wing	1979–1983	(United States) USA	1984	7th
Steve Griffith	Left Wing	1979–1983	(United States) USA	1984	7th
Dave Jensen	Defenseman	1979–1983	(United States) USA	1984	7th
Tom Hirsch	Defenseman	1981–1983	(United States) USA	1984	7th
Corey Millen	Center	1982–1983, 1984–1987	(United States) USA	1984, 1988	7th, 7th
Todd Okerlund	Right Wing	1983–1987	(United States) USA	1988	7th
Dave Snuggerud	Right Wing	1985–1987, 1988–1989	(United States) USA	1988	7th
Craig Johnson	Left Wing	1990–1993	(United States) USA	1994	8th
Travis Richards	Defenseman	1989–1993	(United States) USA	1994	8th
Darby Hendrickson	Center	1991–1993	(United States) USA	1994	8th
Erik Johnson	Defenseman	2006–2007	(United States) USA	2010	Silver
Phil Kessel	Center/Right Wing	2005–2006	(United States) USA	2010, 2014	Silver, 4th
Paul Martin	Defenseman	2000–2003	(United States) USA	2014	4th
Thomas Vanek	Left Wing	2002–2004	Austria	2014	10th
Blake Wheeler	Center/Right Wing	2005–2008	(United States) USA	2014	4th
Ryan Stoa	Center/Left Wing	2005–2009	(United States) USA	2018	7th
Aaron Ness	Defenseman	2008–2011	(United States) USA	2022	5th
Ben Meyers	Left Wing	2019–2022	(United States) USA	2022	5th
Brock Faber	Defenseman	2020–2023	(United States) USA	2022, 2026	5th, Gold
Matthew Knies	Left Wing	2021–2023	(United States) USA	2022	5th
Erik Haula	Left Wing	2010–2013	Finland	2026	Bronze
Jackson LaCombe	Defenseman	2019–2023	(United States) USA	2026	Gold

† Were members of the AHA team that was allowed to play in the Olympics but disqualified from medal contention.

=== Honored members ===
Retired Numbers

The Gophers have retired only one number. On November 15, 1998, the team retired John Mayasich's number 8. Mayasich, a two-time All-American, played four seasons with the Gophers (1951–1955) and holds team records for goals and points scored both in a game and for a career. Although he was a member of the silver medal 1956 and gold medal 1960 Winter Olympic U.S. hockey teams, he only played professionally briefly, in minor league hockey.

Hobey Baker Award

Four players from the University of Minnesota have won the Hobey Baker Award, awarded annually to "the outstanding collegiate hockey player in the United States." Neal Broten (1978–1981) became the award's first recipient in 1981. Robb Stauber (1986–1989) won the award as a sophomore in 1988, becoming the first goaltender to be so honored. Brian Bonin (1992–1996) won the award in 1996 after nearly winning it the previous season. In 2002, Jordan Leopold (1998–2002) became the first University of Minnesota player to win both the Hobey Baker Award and an NCAA Championship in the same season.

Golden Gophers players drafted in the first round of the NHL entry draft

Erik Johnson, Phil Kessel, Thomas Vanek, Blake Wheeler, Kyle Okposo, Erik Rasmussen, Douglas Zmolek, Keith Ballard, Michael Ramsey, Tom Chorske, Nick Leddy, Nick Bjugstad, David Fischer, Jordan Schroeder, Kris Chucko, Patrick White, Brady Skjei, James O'Brien, Jeff Taffe, Ryan Johnson, Chaz Lucius, Logan Cooley, Jimmy Snuggerud, Sam Rinzel, Oliver Moore.

== Statistical leaders ==
=== Career points leaders ===
Player	Years	GP	G	A	Pts	PIM
John Mayasich	1951–1955	111	144	154	298	
Pat Micheletti	1982–1986	162	120	149	269	
Corey Millen	1982–1987	149	119	122	241	
Bryan Erickson	1979–1983	144	109	129	238	
Larry Olimb	1988–1992	182	59	159	218	
Brian Bonin	1992–1996	166	100	116	216	
Steve Ulseth	1977–1981	148	84	118	202	
Tim Harrer	1976–1980	157	117	84	201	
John Pohl	1998–2002	165	71	129	200	
Richard Dougherty	1951–1954	81	109	78	187	

=== Career goaltending leaders ===
GP = Games played; Min = Minutes played; W = Wins; L = Losses; T = Ties; GA = Goals against; SO = Shutouts; SV% = Save percentage; GAA = Goals against average

Minimum 40 games

Player	Years	GP	Min	W	L	T	GA	SO	SV%	GAA
Adam Wilcox	2012–2015	115	6864	73	26	14	239	13	.922	2.09
Justen Close	2019–2024	100	5625	62	25	6	204	13	.924	2.18
Jack LaFontaine	2019–2022	74	4258	43	24	6	162	6	.920	2.28
Kent Patterson	2008–2012	88	4918	44	29	9	202	7	.912	2.45
Kellen Briggs	2003–2007	131	7445	84	34	8	303	13	.907	2.45

Statistics current through the end of the 2023–24 season.

== Coaches ==
In their eighty-five season history, the Gophers have had a total of fifteen head coaches, including three interim coaches. John Mariucci took a one-year leave of absence during the 1955–1956 season to serve as head coach of the U.S. men's hockey team that won the silver medal at the 1956 Winter Olympics. Halfway through the 1971–1972 season, Glen Sonmor left the Gophers to become the general manager and head coach for the Minnesota Fighting Saints of the World Hockey Association. Doug Woog was suspended for two games during the 1996–1997 season for concealing an illegal payment to a former player after his scholarship ended. During this time, assistant head coach Mike Guentzel served as the team's head coach. In 2009, Assistant Coach John Hill coached 2 games while Don Lucia was out for medical reasons.

=== All-time coaching records ===
As of the end of the 2025–26 season

Tenure	Coach	Years	Record	Pct.
1921–1922	I. D. MacDonald	1	6–3–1	.650
1922–1930	Emil Iverson	8	82–22–11	.761
1930–1935	Frank Pond *	5	49–24–4	.662
1935–1947	Larry Armstrong	12	125–54–10	.688
1947–1952	Doc Romnes	5	53–59–0	.473
1952–1955, 1956–1966	John Mariucci *	13	197–140–18	.580
1955–1956	Marsh Ryman * (interim)	1	16–12–1	.569
1966–1971	Glen Sonmor	5.5	77–80–5	.491
1971–1972	Ken Yackel * (interim)	0.5	7–17–0	.292
1972–1979	Herb Brooks *	7	167–97–18	.624
1979–1985	Brad Buetow *	6	171–75–8	.689
1985–1999	Doug Woog *	14	388–187–40	.662
1996	Mike Guentzel * (interim)	—	2–1–0	.667
1999–2018	Don Lucia	19	457–248–73	.634
2018–2026	Bob Motzko	7	172–104–24	.613
Totals	15 coaches	105 seasons	1,957–1,100–210	.631

* former Gophers player

== Arenas ==
- Minnesota State Fairgrounds Hippodrome (1923–1934)
- Minneapolis Arena (1925–1950) (primary arena)
- St. Paul Auditorium (1932–1950) (occasionally)
- Williams Arena/Old Mariucci Arena (1950–1993)
- Mariucci Arena (1993–present)

== Program records ==
=== Career ===
- Most goals in a career: John Mayasich, 144 (1951–55)
- Most assists in a career: Larry Olimb, 159 (1988–92)
- Most points in a career: John Mayasich, 298 (1951–55)
- Most penalty minutes in a career: Matt DeMarchi, 473 (1999–2003)
- Most points in a career, defenseman: Todd Richards, 158 (1985–89)
- Most wins in a career, Kellen Briggs, 84 (2003–07)
- Most shutouts in a career, Kellen Briggs, 13 (2003–07); Adam Wilcox, 13 (2012–15)

=== Season ===
Players

- Most goals in a season: Tim Harrer, 53 (1979–80)
- Most assists in a season: Aaron Broten, 59 (1980–81)
- Most points in a season: Aaron Broten, 106 (1980–81)
- Most penalty minutes in a season: Pat Micheletti, 154 (1984–85)
- Most points in a season, defenseman: Mike Crowley, 63 (1995–96)
- Most points in a season, rookie: Aaron Broten, 72 (1979–80)
- Most shutouts in a season: Kent Patterson, 7 (2011–12)
- Most power play goals in a season (since 1975): Tim Harrer, 27 (1979–80)

Team (since 1950)

- Most wins in a season: 35 (1985–86)
- Most WCHA wins in a season: 28 (1987–88)
- Most overtime games in a season: 16 (2007–08)
- Longest overall unbeaten streak: 22 (10/13/2006–1/12/2007)

=== Game ===
Player

- Most goals in a game: John Mayasich, 6 (vs Winnipeg, 12/10/1954)
- Most assists in a game: 11 players, 5 (last time: Gino Guyer vs Mercyhurst, 3/27/2003)
- Most points in a game: John Mayasich, 8 (at Michigan, 1/14/1955)
- Most penalty minutes in a game: Mike Crupi, 27 (at Michigan, 1/13/1967)

Team

- Most goals in a game: 16 (vs Brown, 12/21/1979 & vs Maine, 1/4/1986)
- Most goals in a period: 8 (at Michigan, 1/5/1979 & at CC, 3/1/1947)
- Most assists in a period: 14 (vs Maine, 1/4/1986)
- Most penalty minutes in a game: 109 (at UMD, 3/14/1998)
- Most penalty minutes in a period: 81 (at UMD, 3/14/1998)

== Golden Gophers in the NHL ==
As of Feb 13, 2025, however the page is not fully up to date.

= NHL All-Star team	= NHL All-Star	= NHL All-Star and NHL All-Star team	= Hall of Famers

Player	Position	Team(s)	Years	Games	Stanley Cups
Mark Alt	Defenseman	PHI, COL, LAK	2014–2021	20	0
Russ Anderson	Defenseman	PIT, HFD, LAK	1976–1985	519	0
Mike Antonovich	Center	MNS, HFD, NJD	1975–1984	87	0
Les Auge	Defenseman	COR	1980–1981	6	0
Bill Baker	Defenseman	MTL, COR, STL, NYR	1980–1983	143	0
Keith Ballard	Defenseman	PHO, FLA, VAN, MIN	2005–2015	604	0
Tim Bergland	Right Wing	WSH, TBL	1989–1994	182	0
Bob Bergloff	Defenseman	MNS	1982–1983	2	0
Stu Bickel	Defenseman	NYR, MIN	2011–2015	76	0
Jake Bischoff	Defenseman	VGK	2019–2020	4	0
Nick Bjugstad	Center	FLA, PIT, MIN, ARI, EDM, UTA, STL, NJD	2012–Present	796	0
Scott Bjugstad	Forward	MNS, PIT, LAK	1983–1992	317	0
John Blue	Goaltender	BOS, BUF	1992–1996	46	0
Brian Bonin	Center	PIT, MIN	1998–2001	12	0
Jim Boo	Defenseman	MNS	1977–1978	6	0
Travis Boyd	Center	WSH, TOR, VAN, ARI, MIN	2017–Present	299	0
Aaron Broten	Forward	COR, NJD, MNS, QUE, TOR, WPG	1980–1992	748	0
Neal Broten	Center	MNS, DAL, NJD, LAK	1980–1997	1,099	1
Paul Broten	Right Wing	NYR, DAL, STL	1989–1996	322	0
Bill Butters	Defenseman	MNS	1977–1979	72	0
Tom Chorske	Left Wing	MTL, NJD, OTT, NYI, WSH, CGY, PIT	1989–2000	596	1
Steve Christoff	Center	MNS, CGY, LAK	1979–1984	248	0
Kris Chucko	Right Wing	CGY	2008–2009	2	0
Ben Clymer	Defenseman	TBL, WSH	1999–2007	438	0
Logan Cooley	Center	ARI, UTA	2023–Present	186	0
Mike Crowley	Defenseman	ANA	1997–2001	67	0
Joe Dziedzic	Left Wing	PIT, PHO	1995–1999	130	0
Bryan Erickson	Center	WSH, LAK, PIT, WPG	1975–1984	351	0
Brock Faber	Defenseman	MIN	2022–Present	220	0
Cade Fairchild	Defenseman	STL	2011–2012	5	0
Hudson Fasching	Right Wing	BUF, ARI, NYI	2015–Present	175	0
Jeff Frazee	Goaltender	NJD	2012–2013	1	0
Gary Gambucci	Center	MNS	1971–1974	51	0
Ken Gernander	Right Wing	NYR	1995–2004	12	0
Alex Goligoski	Defenseman	PIT, DAL, ARI, MIN	2007–Present	1,078	1
Tom Gorence	Right Wing	PHI, EDM	1978–1984	303	0
Ben Hankinson	Right Wing	NJD, TBL	1992–1995	43	0
Casey Hankinson	Right Wing	CHI, ANA	2000–2004	18	0
Tim Harrer	Right Wing	CGY	1982–1983	3	0
Erik Haula	Left Wing	MIN, VGK, CAR, FLA, NSH, BOS, NJD	2013–Present	816	0
Adam Hauser	Goaltender	LAK	2005–2006	1	0
Peter Hayek	Defenseman	MNS	1981–1982	1	0
Seth Helgeson	Defenseman	NJD	2014–2017	50	0
Darby Hendrickson	Center	TOR, NYI, VAN, MIN, COL	1993–2004	518	0
Tom Hirsch	Defenseman	MNS	1983–1988	31	0
Justin Holl	Defenseman	TOR, DET	2017–Present	396	0
Paul Holmgren	Forward	PHI, MNS	1975–1985	527	0
Danny Irmen	Right Wing	MIN	2009–2010	2	0
Steve Janaszak	Goaltender	MNS, COR	1979–1982	3	0
David Jensen	Defenseman	MNS	1983–1986	18	0
Bob Johnson	Center				1†
Craig Johnson	Left Wing	STL, LAK, ANA, TOR, WSH	1994–2004	557	0
Erik Johnson	Defenseman	STL, COL, BUF, PHI	2007–2025	1,023	1
Ryan Johnson	Defenseman	BUF	2023–Present	47	0
Phil Kessel	Left Wing	BOS, TOR, PIT, ARI, VGK	2006–2023	1,286	3
Trent Klatt	Right Wing	MNS, DAL, PHI, VAN, LAK	1991–2004	782	0
Justin Kloos	Center	MIN, ANA	2017–2019	2	0
Matthew Knies	Left Wing	TOR	2022–Present	215	0
Ryan Kraft	Left Wing	SJS	2002–2003	7	0
Jackson LaCombe	Left Wing	ANA	2022–Present	204	0
Jack LaFontaine	Goaltender	CAR	2021–2022	2	0
Reed Larson	Defenseman	DET, BOS, EDM, NYI, MNS, BUF	1976–1990	904	0
Nick Leddy	Defenseman	CHI , NYI, DET, STL, SJS	2010–Present	1,061	1
Jordan Leopold	Defenseman	CGY, COL, FLA, PIT, BUF, STL, CBJ, MIN	2002–2015	695	0

Player	Position	Team(s)	Years	Games	Stanley Cups
Vinni Lettieri	Center	NYR, ANA, BOS	2017–Present	155	0
Ryan Lindgren	Defenseman	NYR, COL, SEA	2018–Present	461	0
John Mariucci	Defenseman	CHI	1940–1948	223	0
Paul Martin	Defenseman	NJD, PIT, SJS	2003–2018	870	0
Chris McAlpine	Defenseman	NJD, STL, TBL, ATL, CHI, LAK	1994–2003	289	0
Jack McCartan	Goaltender	NYR	1959–1961	12	0
Rob McClanahan	Forward	BUF, HFD, NYR	1989–1996	224	0
Bruce McIntosh	Defenseman	MNS	1972–1973	2	0
Murray McLachlan	Goaltender	TOR	1970–1971	2	0
Ben Meyers	Center	COL, ANA, SEA	2021–Present	75	0
Joe Micheletti	Defenseman	STL, COR	1979–1982	158	0
Pat Micheletti	Center	MNS	1987–1988	12	0
Corey Millen	Center	NYR, LAK, NJD, DAL, CGY	1989–1997	335	0
Warren Miller	Forward	NYR, HFD	1979–1983	262	0
Casey Mittelstadt	Left Wing	BUF, COL, BOS	2017–Present	438	0
Oliver Moore	Center	CHI	2024–Present	9	0
Lou Nanne	Defenseman	MNS	1967–1978	635	0
Aaron Ness	Defenseman	NYI, WSH, ARI	2011–2021	72	0
Jeff Nielsen	Right Wing	NYR, ANA, MIN	1996–2001	252	0
Tommy Novak	Center	NSH, PIT	2021–Present	259	0
Jim O'Brien	Center	OTT, NJD	2010–2018	77	0
Todd Okerlund	Right Wing	NYI	1987–1988	4	0
Kyle Okposo	Right Wing	NYI, BUF, FLA	2007–2024	1,051	1
Tom Pederson	Defenseman	SJS, TOR	1992–1997	240	0
Derek Peltier	Defenseman	COL	2008–2010	14	0
Frank Pietrangelo	Goaltender	PIT, HFD	1987–1994	141	1
Lance Pitlick	Defenseman	OTT, FLA	1994–2002	393	0
Rem Pitlick	Center	NSH, MIN, MTL, CHI	2018–2024	132	0
Johnny Pohl	Center	STL, TOR	2003–2008	115	0
Mike Polich	Left Wing	MTL, MNS	1976–1981	226	1
Ryan Potulny	Center	PHI, EDM, CHI, OTT	2005–2011	126	0
Mike Ramsey	Defenseman	BUF, PIT, DET	1979–1997	1,070	0
Sampo Ranta	Left Wing	COL	2020–2023	16	0
Erik Rasmussen	Center	BUF, LAK, NJD	1997–2007	545	0
Kyle Rau	Center	FLA, MIN	2015–2022	61	0
Scott Reedy	Center	SJS	2021–2022	35	0
Mike Reilly	Defenseman	MIN, MTL, OTT, BOS, FLA, NYI, CAR	2015–Present	447	0
Todd Richards	Defenseman	HFD	1990–1992	8	0
Travis Richards	Defenseman	DAL	1994–1996	3	0
Sam Rinzel	Defenseman	CHI	2024–Present	40	0
Craig Sarner	Right Wing	BOS	1974–1975	7	0
Nate Schmidt	Defenseman	WSH, VGK, VAN, WPG, FLA UTA	2013–Present	798	1
Jordan Schroeder	Center	VAN, MIN, CBJ	2012–2018	165	0
Nick Seeler	Defenseman	CHI, MIN, PHI	2017–Present	373	0
Randy Skarda	Defenseman	STL	1989–1992	26	0
Brady Skjei	Defenseman	NYR, CAR, NSH	2015–Present	691	0
Wyatt Smith	Center	PHO, NSH, NYI, MIN, COL	1999–2008	211	0
Dave Snuggerud	Right Wing	BUF, SJS, PHI	1989–1993	265	0
Jimmy Snuggerud	Right Wing	STL	2024–Present	7	0
Robb Stauber	Goaltender	LAK, BUF	1989–1995	62	0
Ryan Stoa	Center	COL, WSH	2009–2014	40	0
Jeff Taffe	Center	PHO, NYR, PIT, FLA, CHI, MIN	2002–2012	180	0
Barry Tallackson	Right Wing	NJD	2005–2009	20	0
Jeff Teal	Forward	MTL	1984–1985	6	0
Dan Trebil	Defenseman	ANA, PIT, STL	1996–2001	85	0
Thomas Vanek	Left Wing	BUF, NYI, MTL, MIN, DET, FLA, VAN, CBJ	2005–2019	1,029	0
Sammy Walker	Center	MIN	2022–2024	13	0
Erik Westrum	Center	PHO, MIN, TOR	2003–2007	27	0
Blake Wheeler	Right Wing	BOS, ATL, WPG, NYR	2008–2025	1,172	0
Adam Wilcox	Goaltender	BUF	2017–2018	1	0
Matthew Wood	Right Wing	NSH	2024–Present	6	0
Ken Yackel	Right Wing	BOS	1958–1959	6	0
Tom Younghans	Center	MNS, NYR	1976–1982	429	0
Doug Zmolek	Defenseman	SJS, DAL, LAK, CHI	1992–2000	467	0

† Bob Johnson won a Stanley Cup as the head coach for the Pittsburgh Penguins.

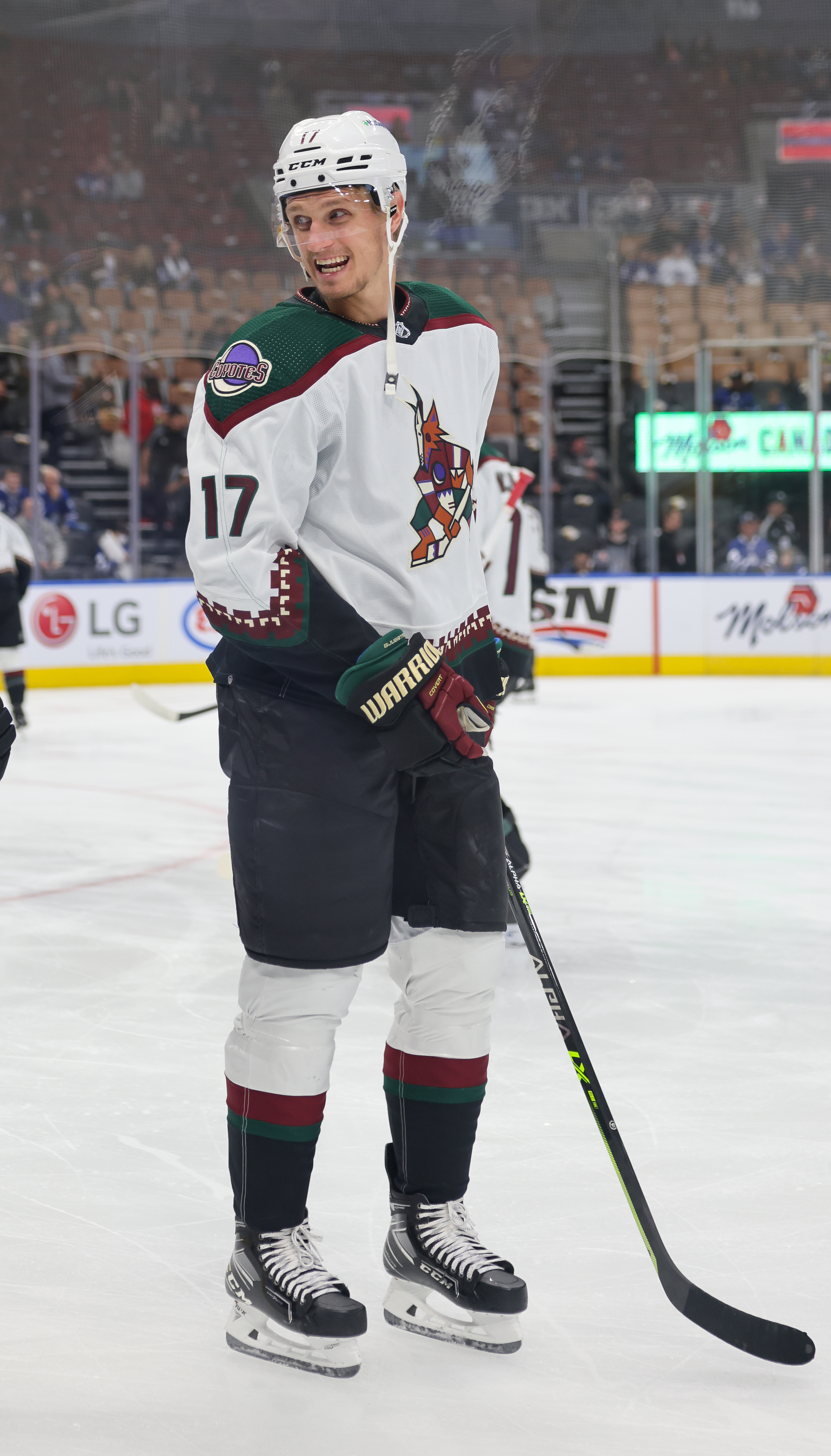
Nick Bjugstad

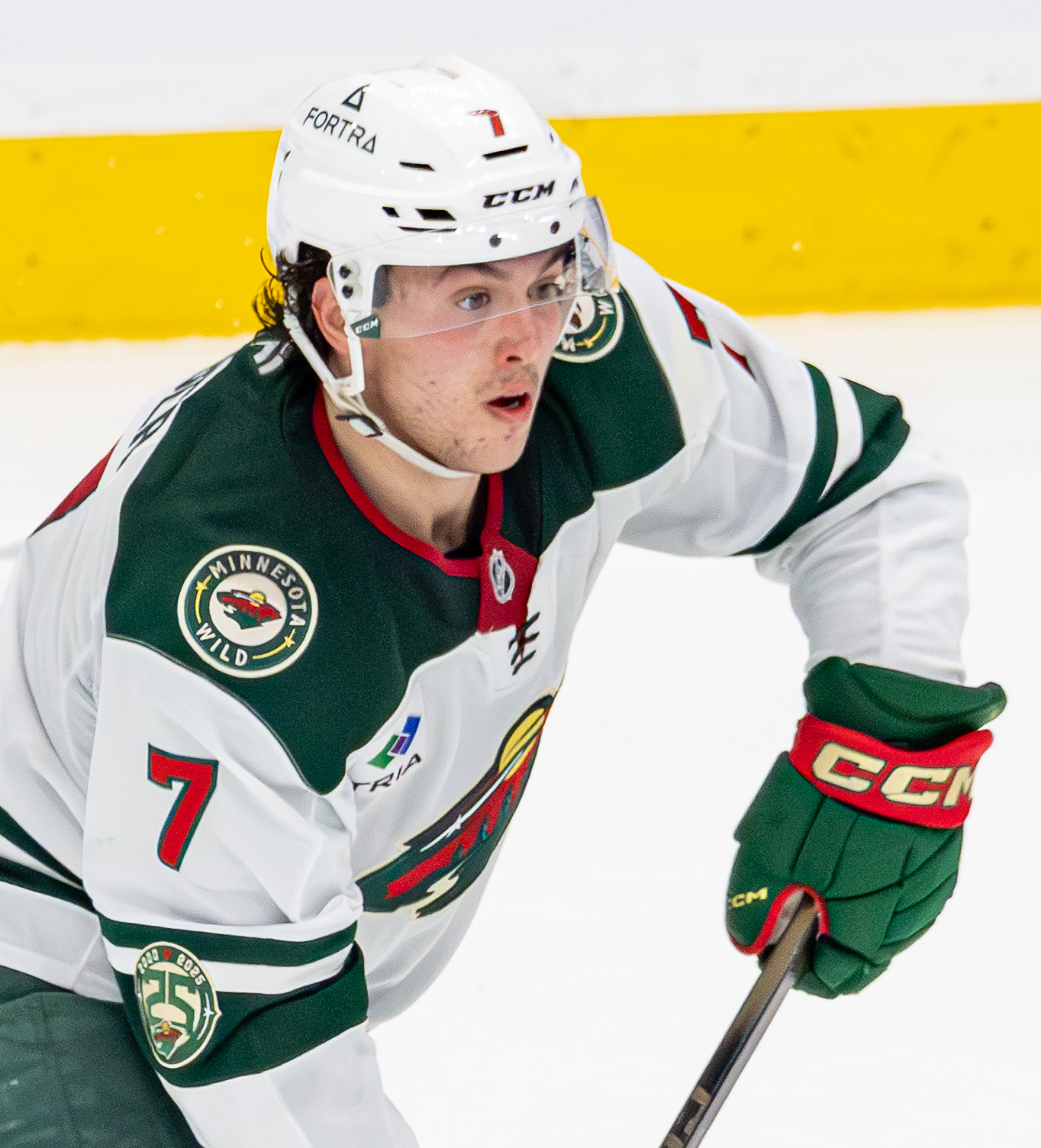
Brock Faber

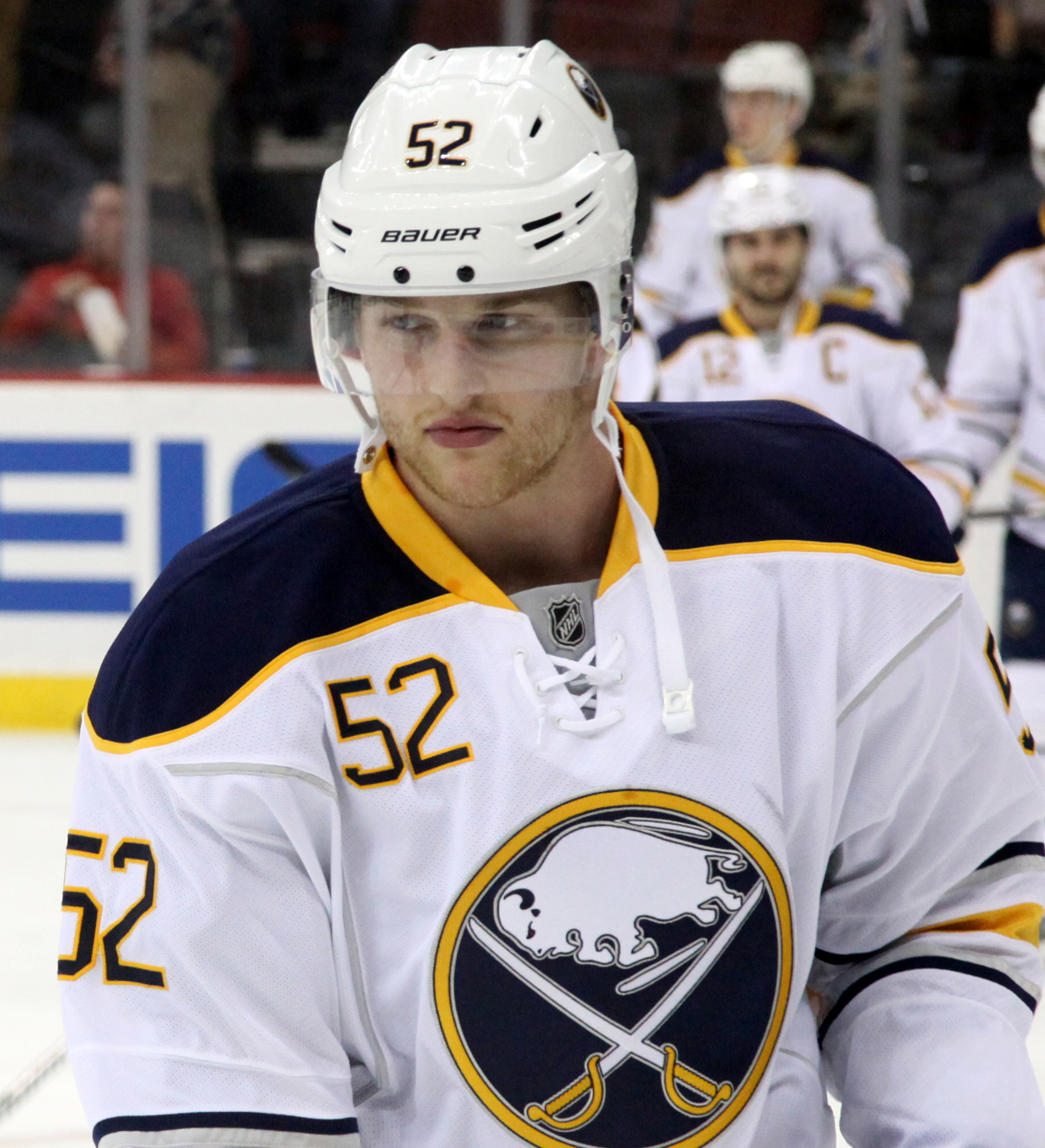
Hudson Fasching

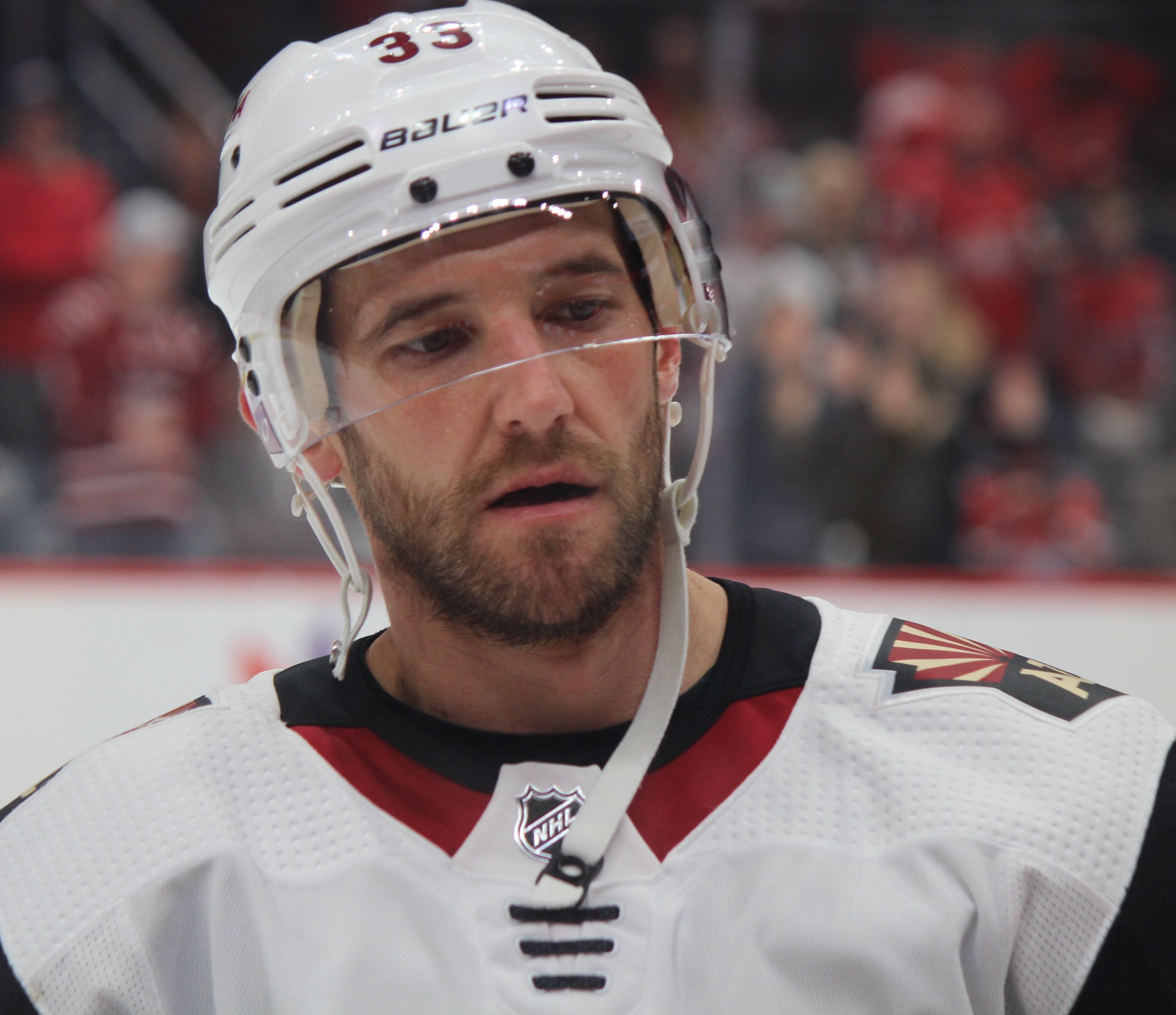
Alex Goligoski

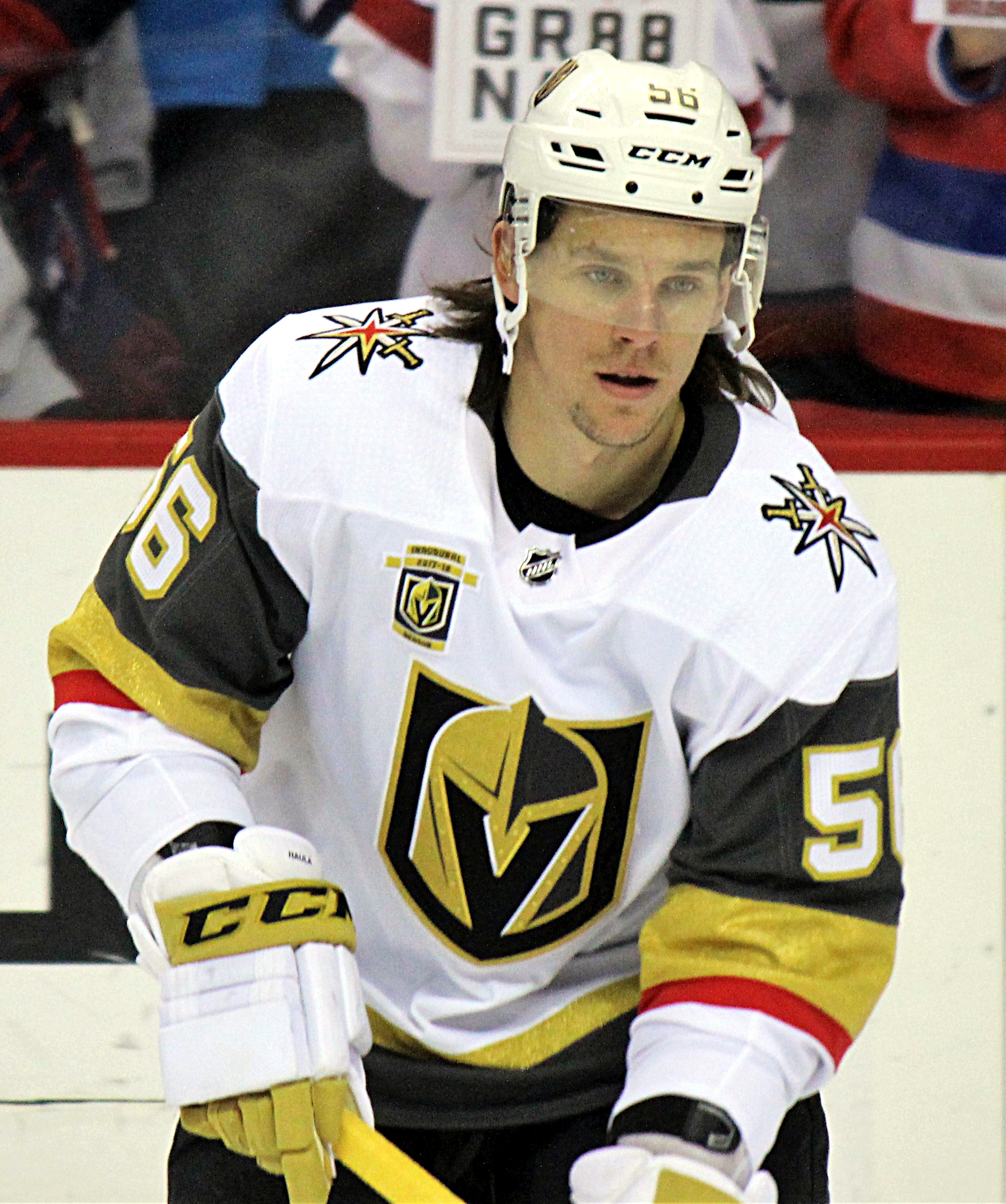
Erik Haula

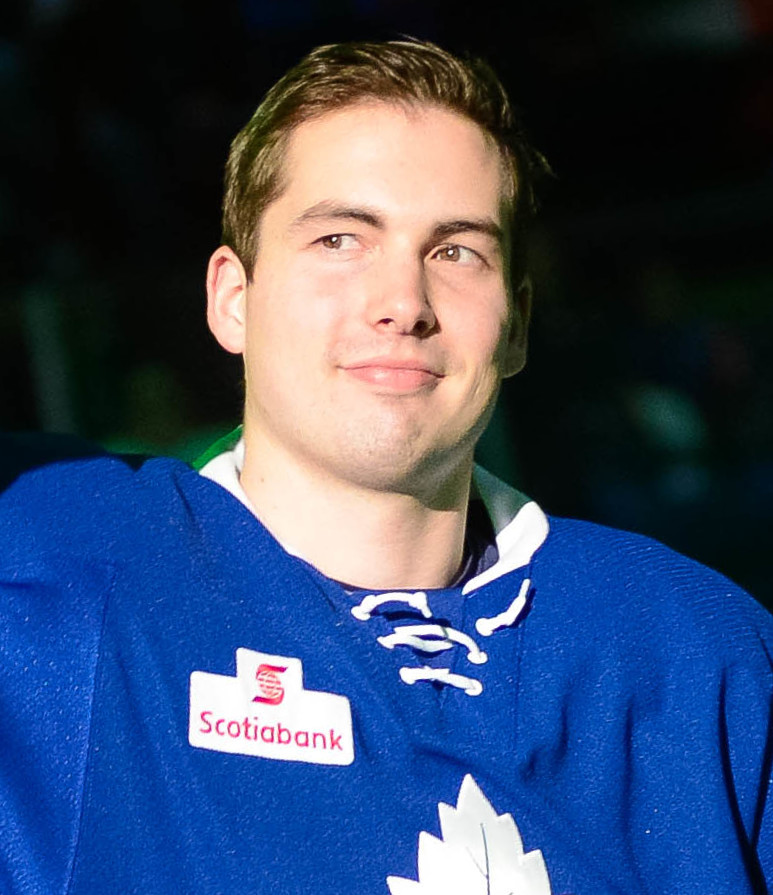
Justin Holl

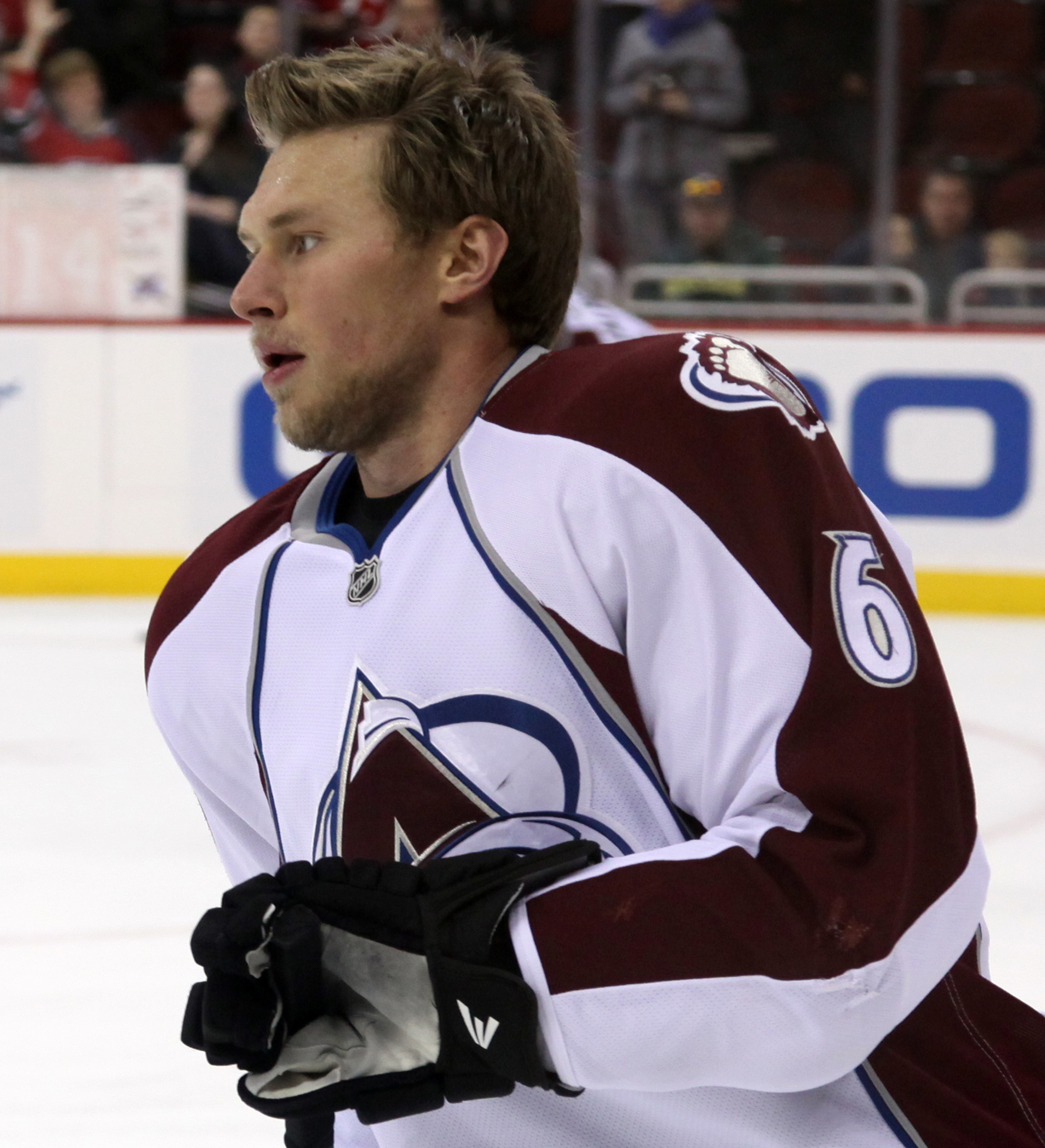
Erik Johnson

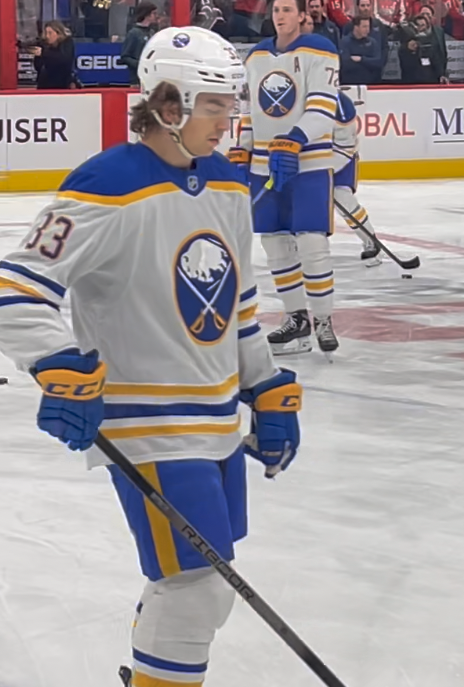
Ryan Johnson

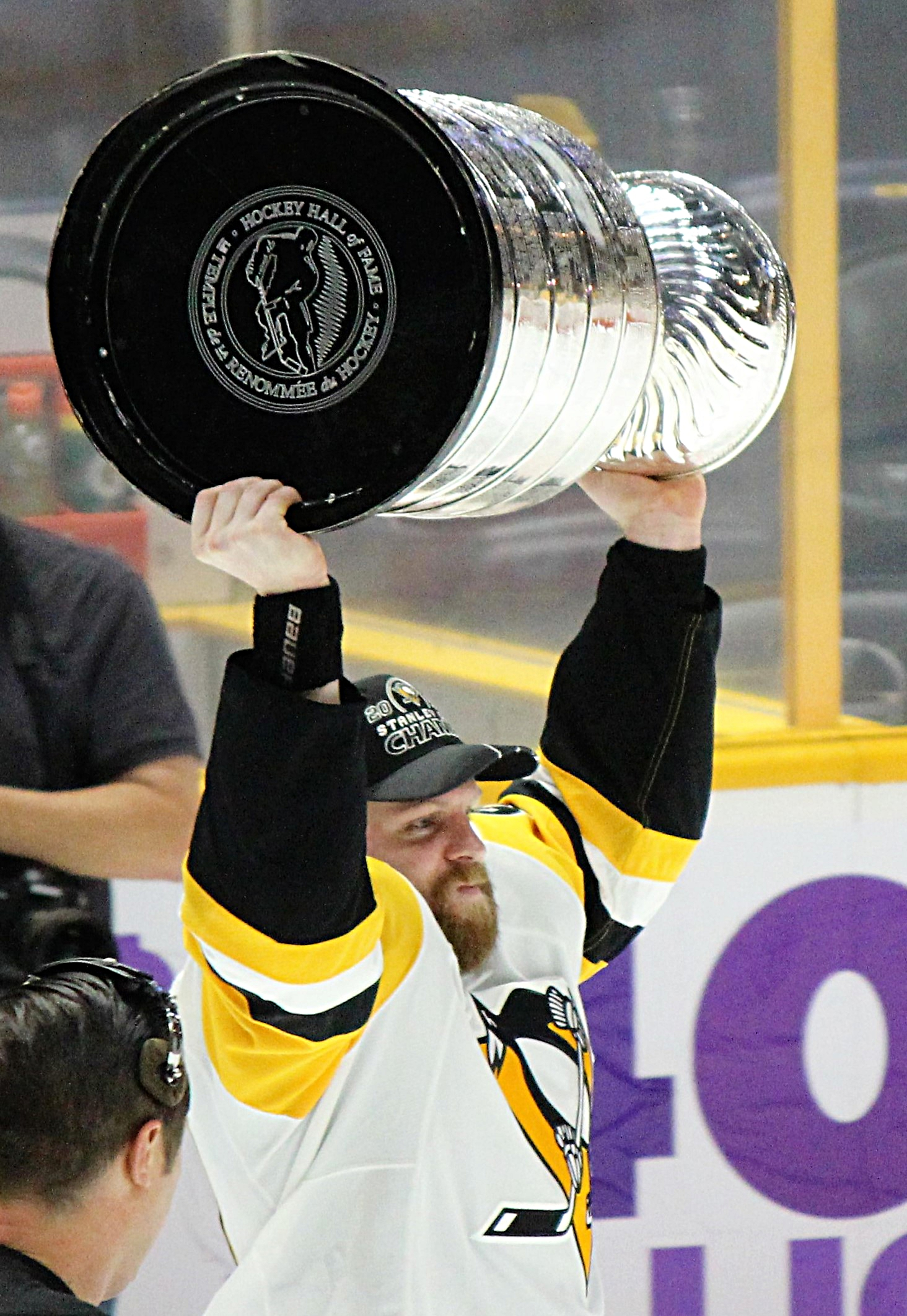
Phil Kessel

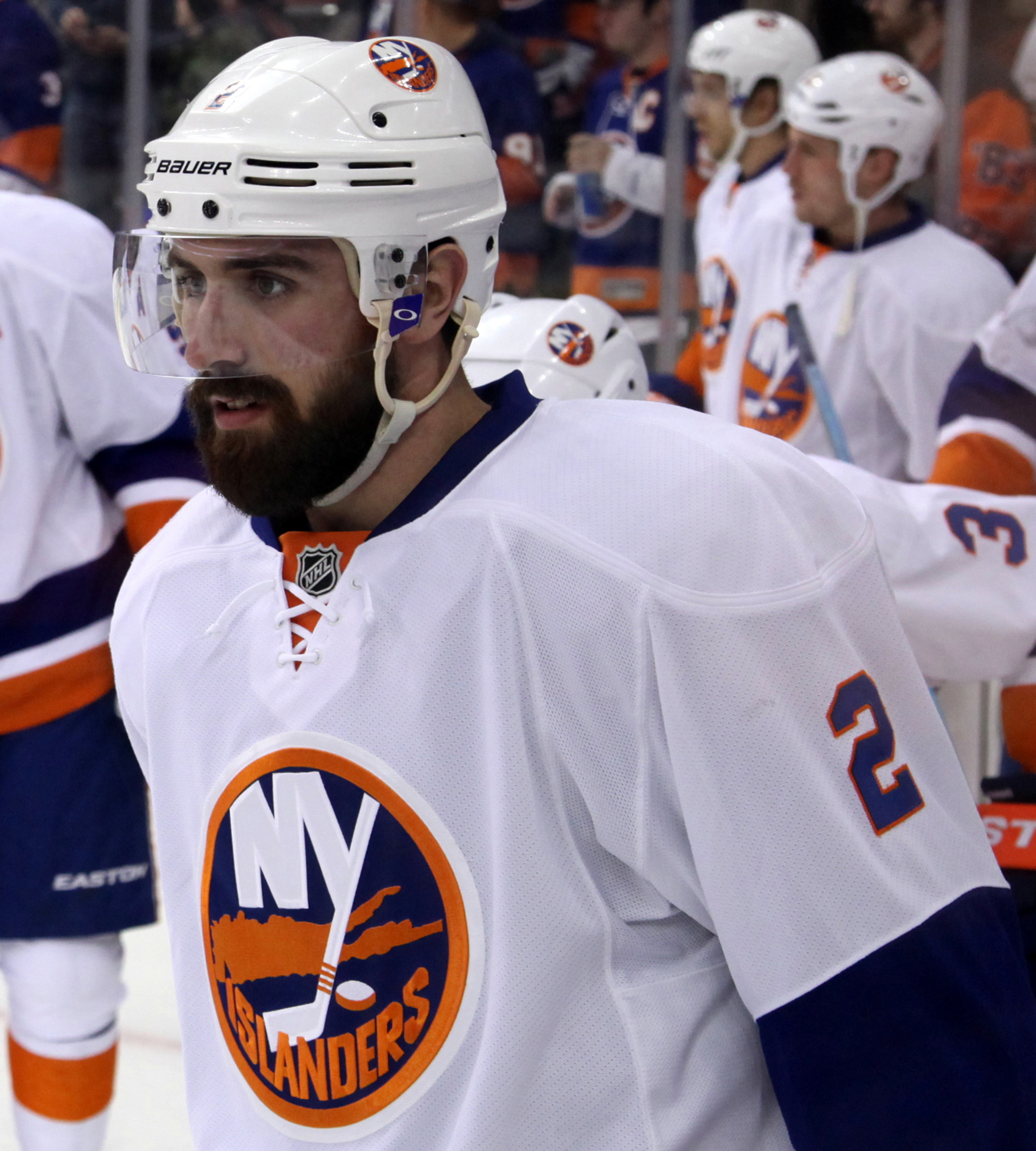
Nick Leddy

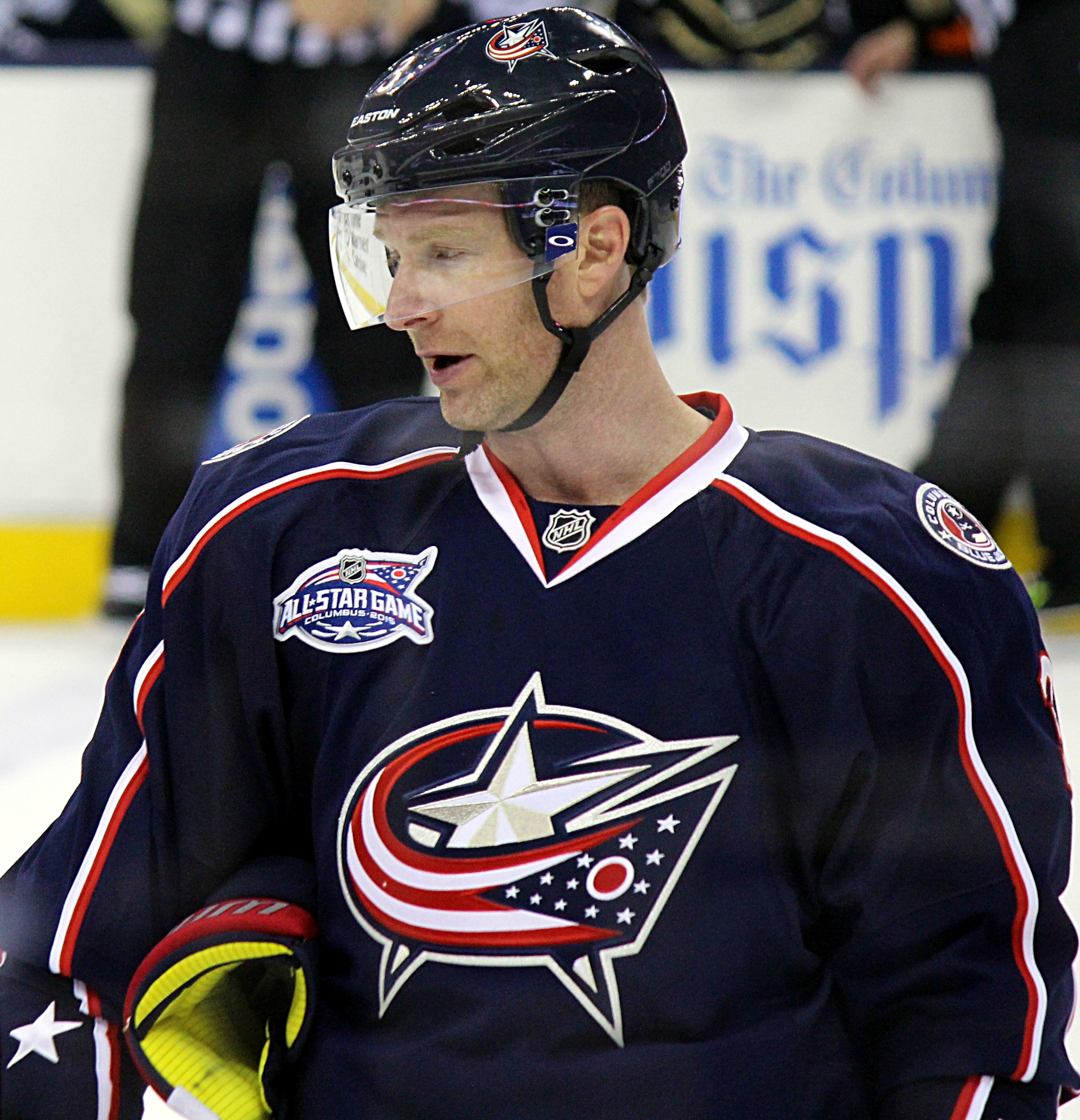
Jordan Leopold

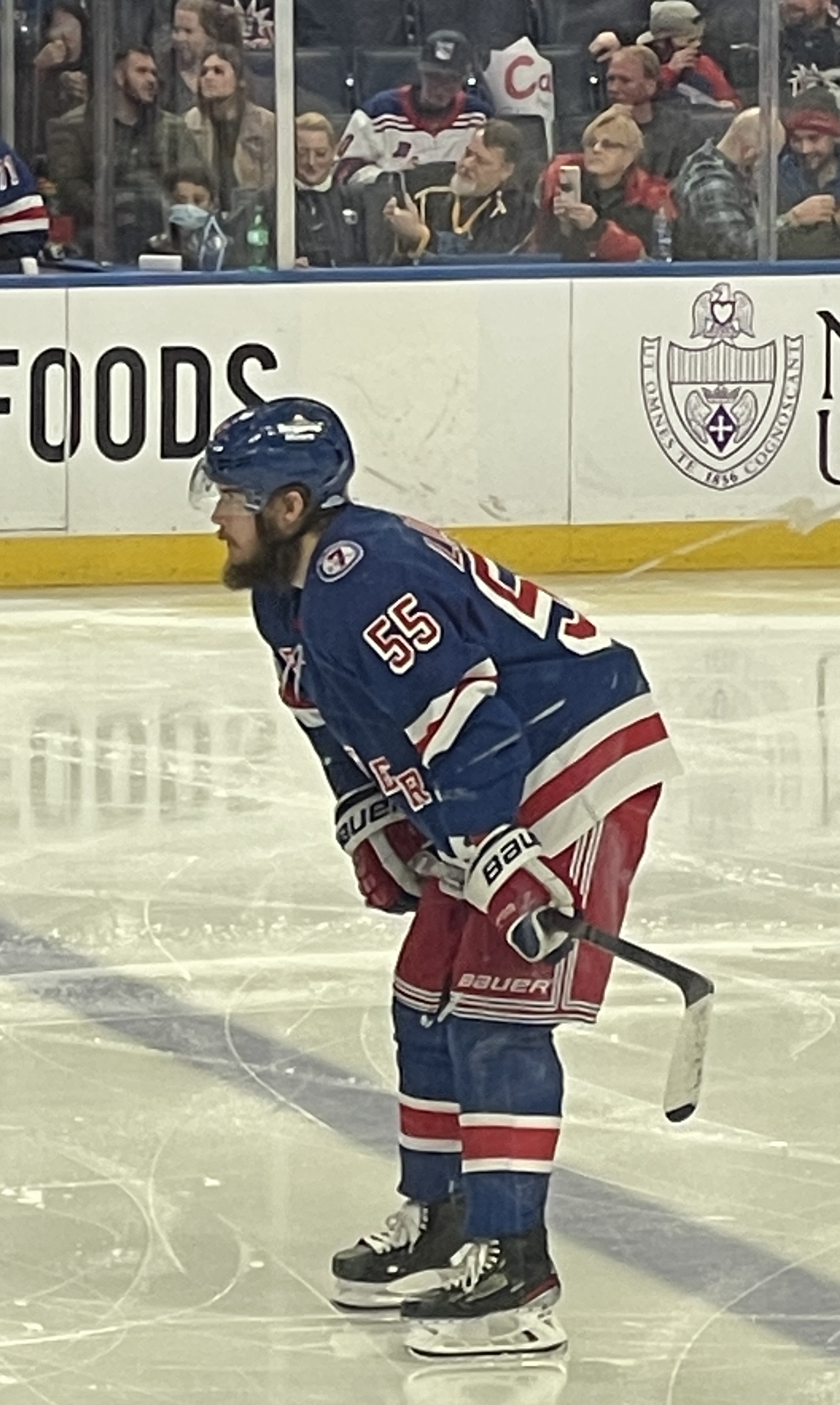
Ryan Lindgren

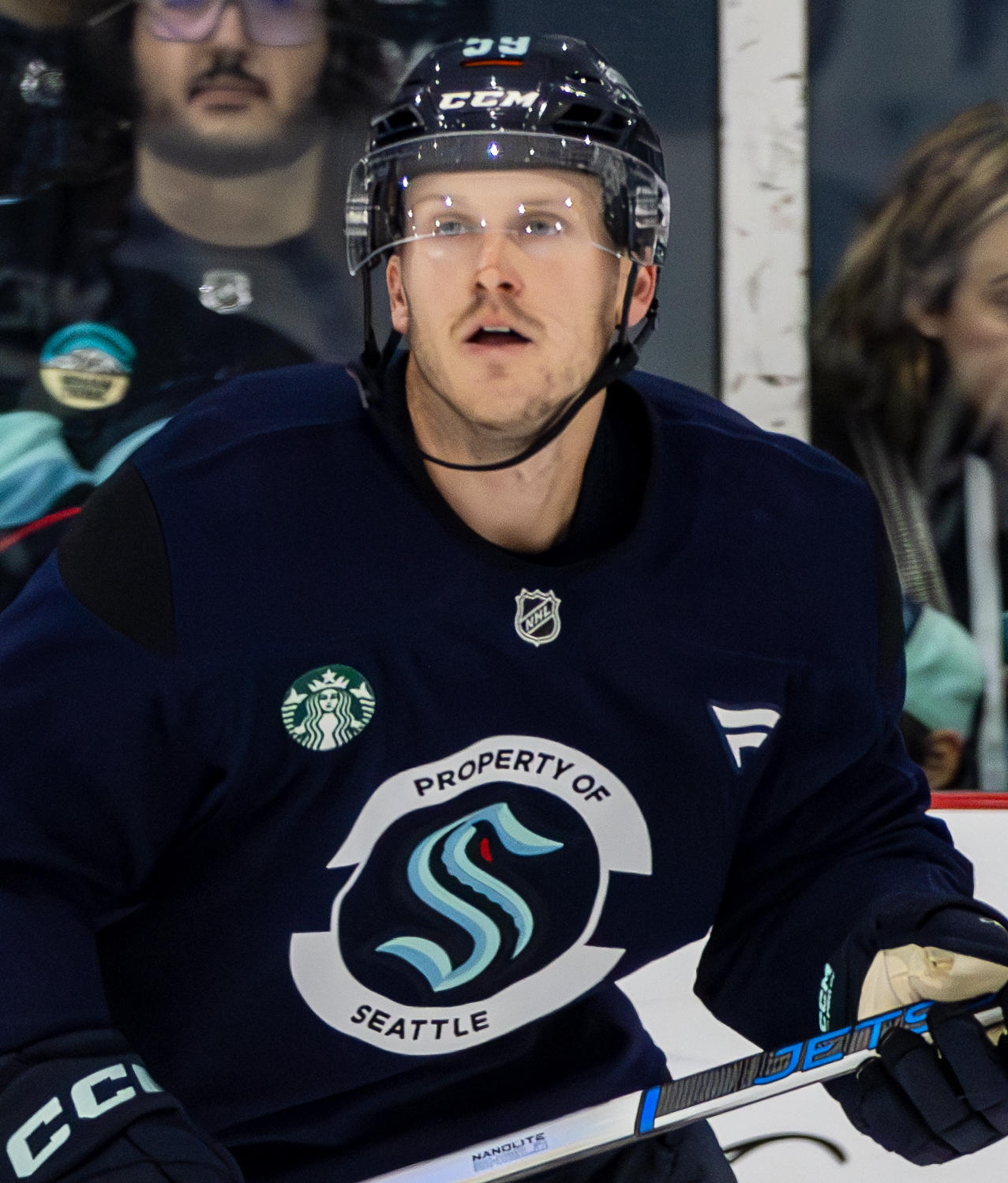
Ben Meyers

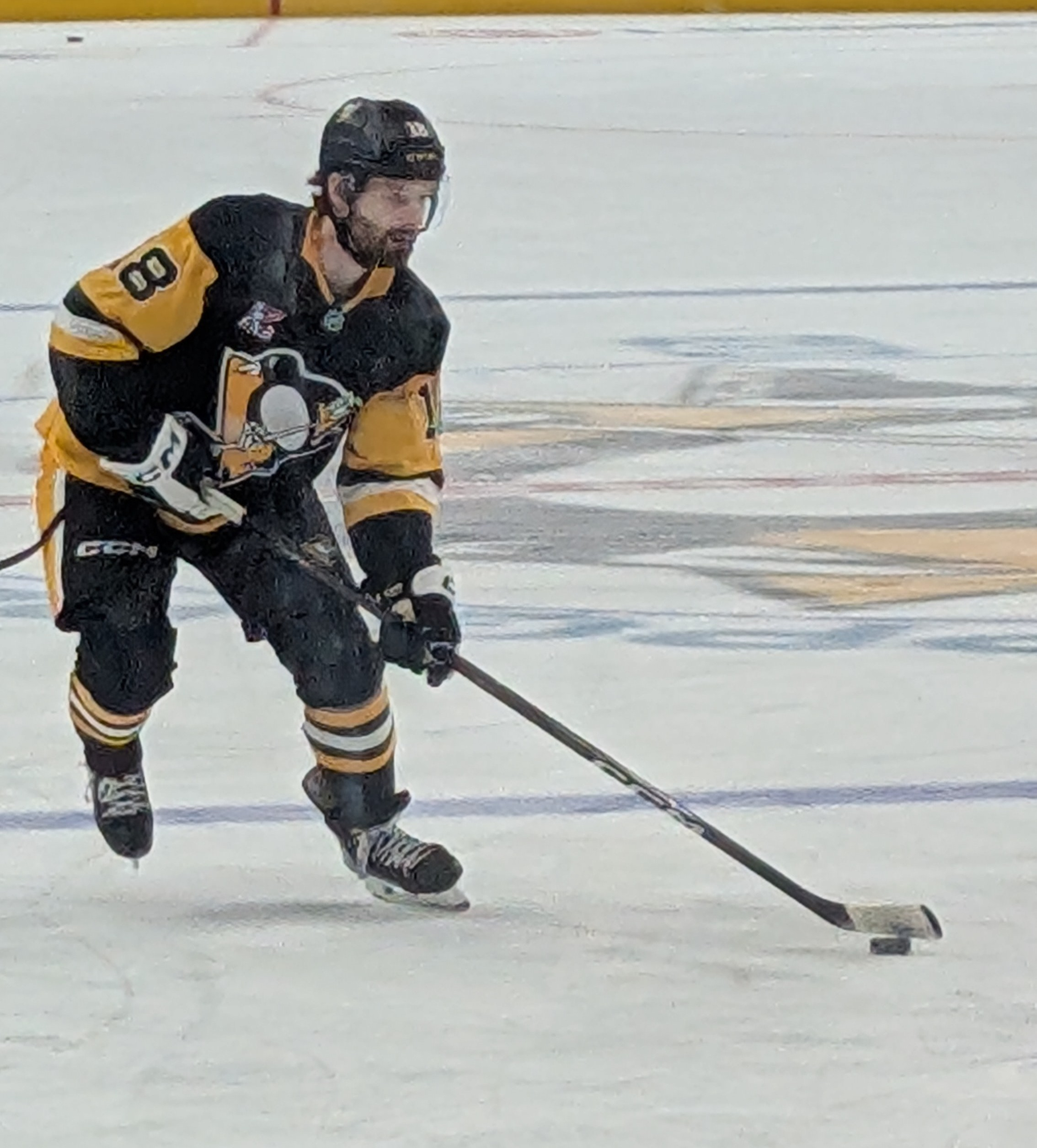
Tommy Novak

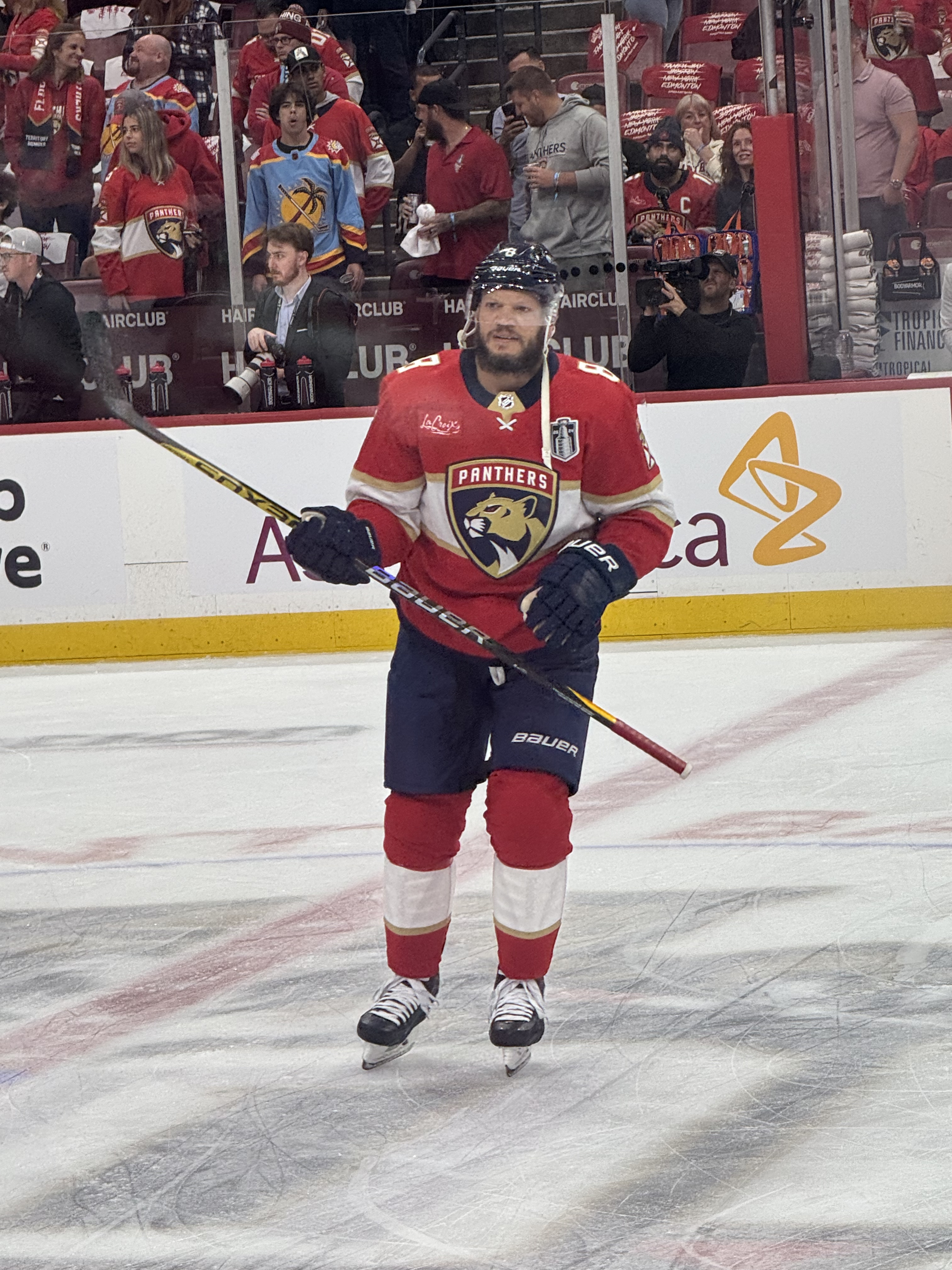
Kyle Okposo

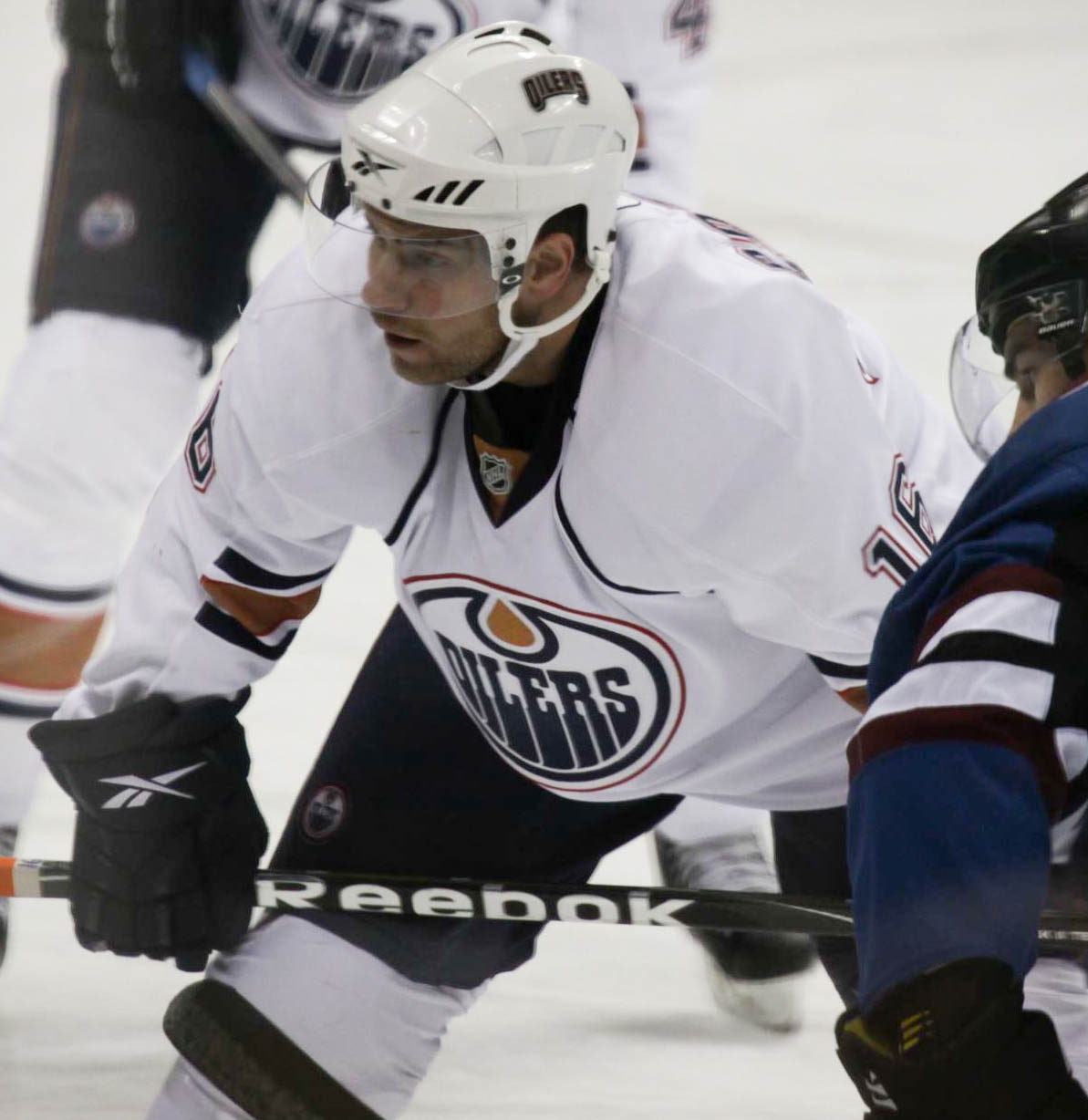
Ryan Potulny

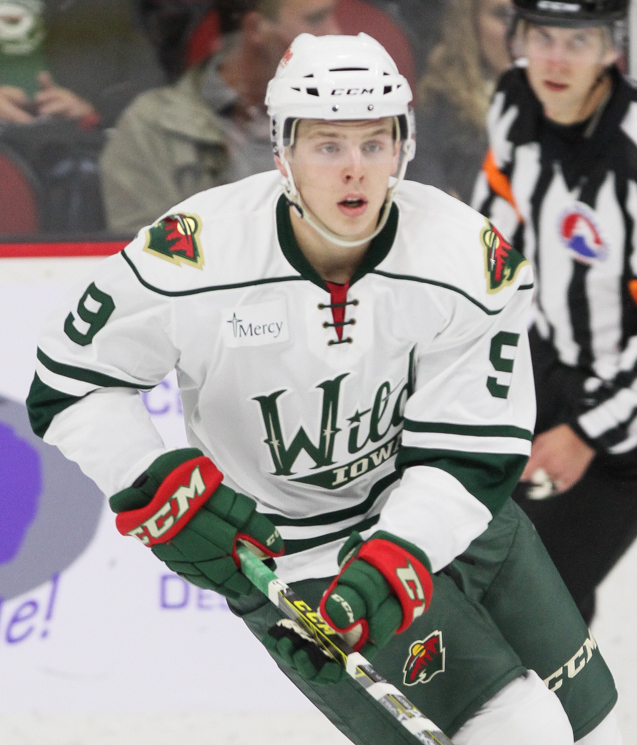
Mike Reilly

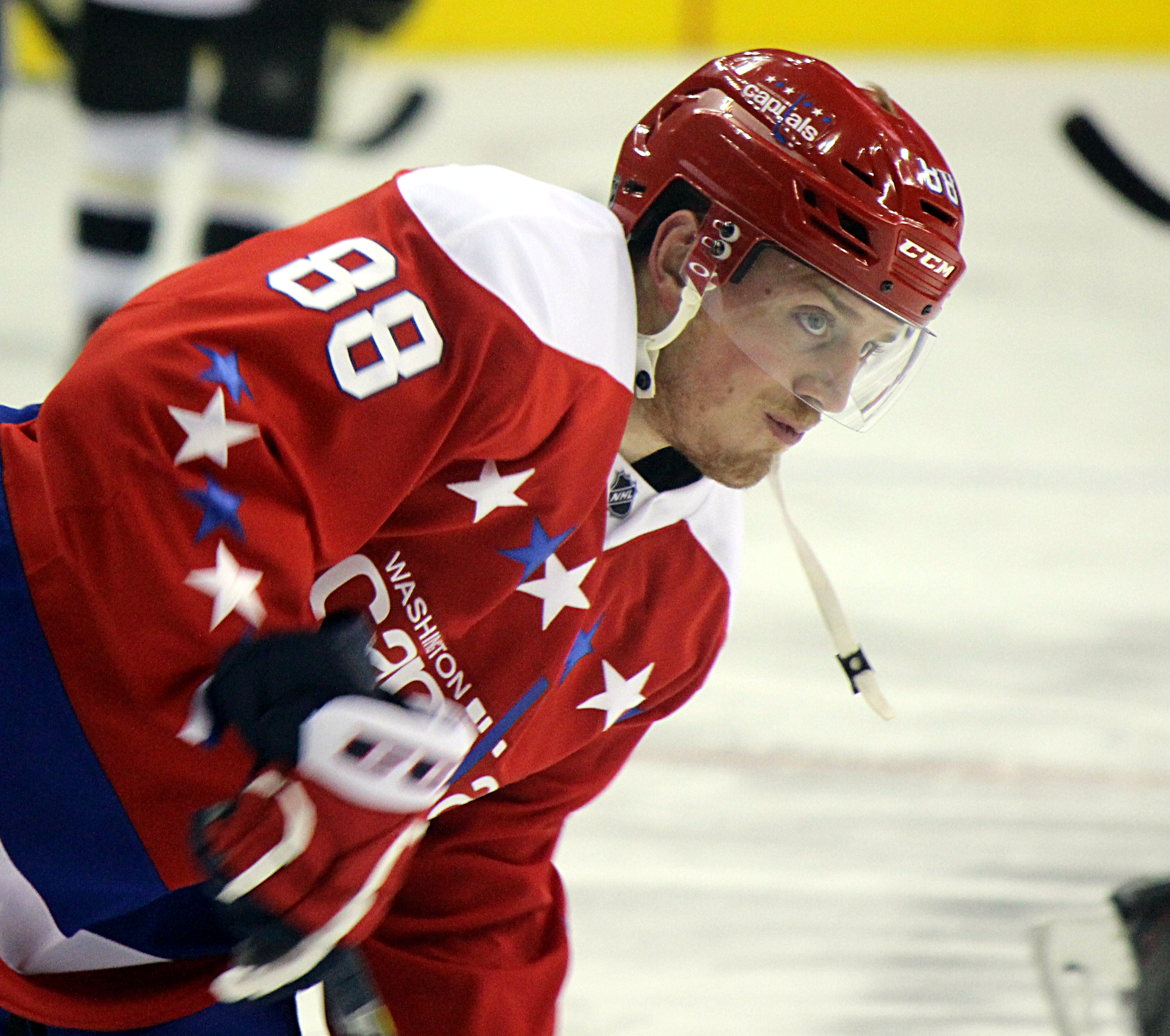
Nate Schmidt

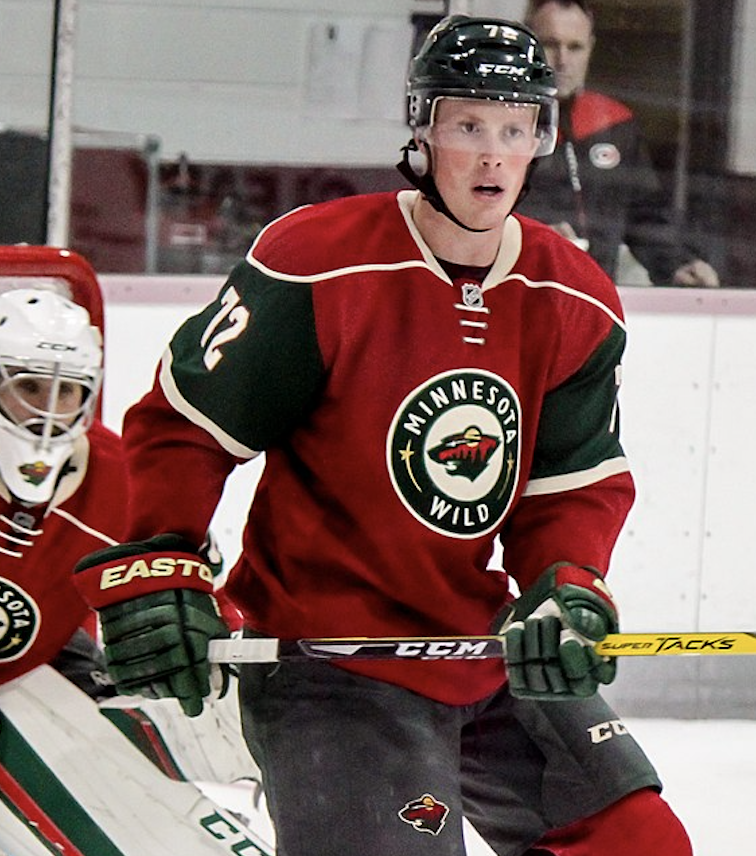
Nick Seeler

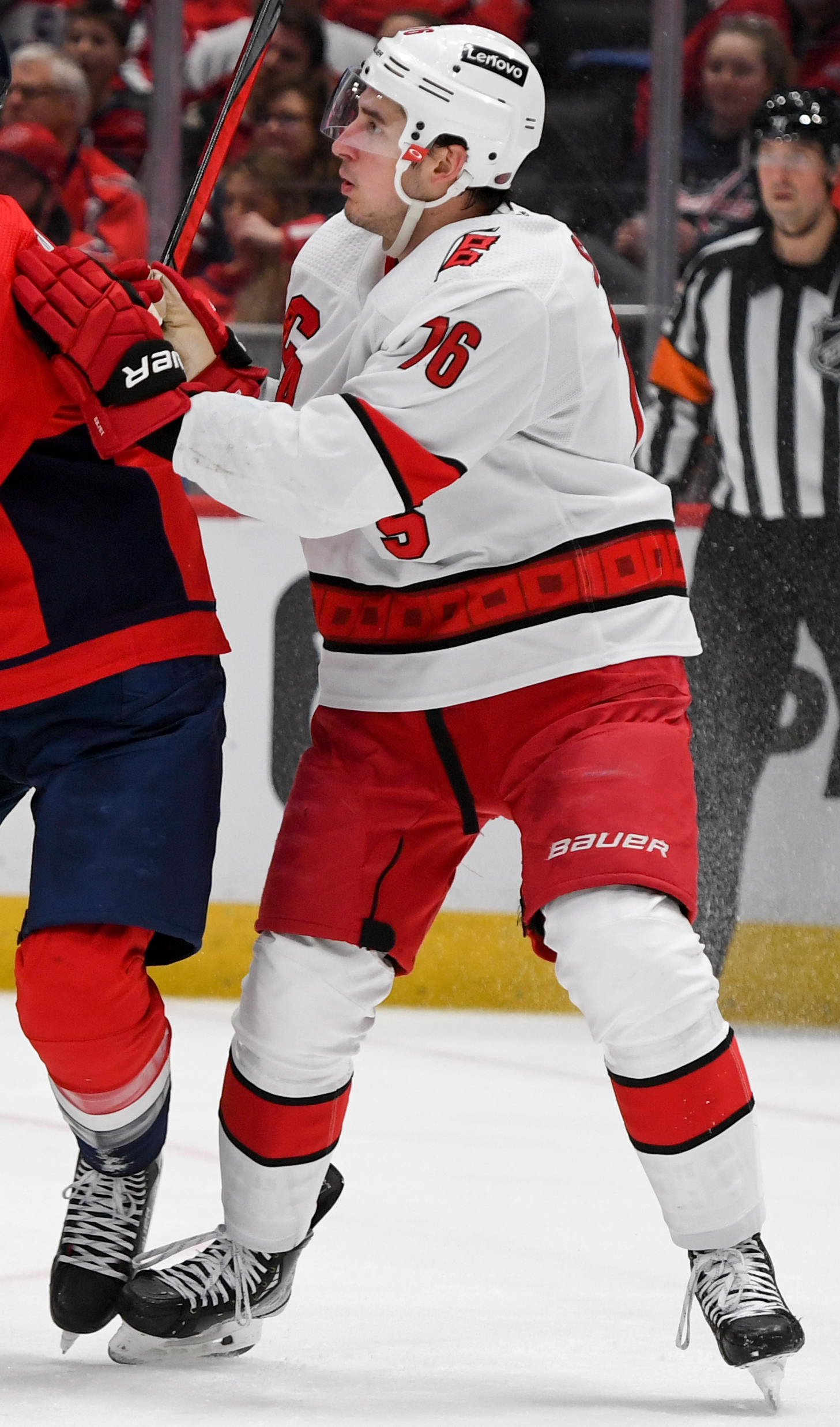
Brady Skjei

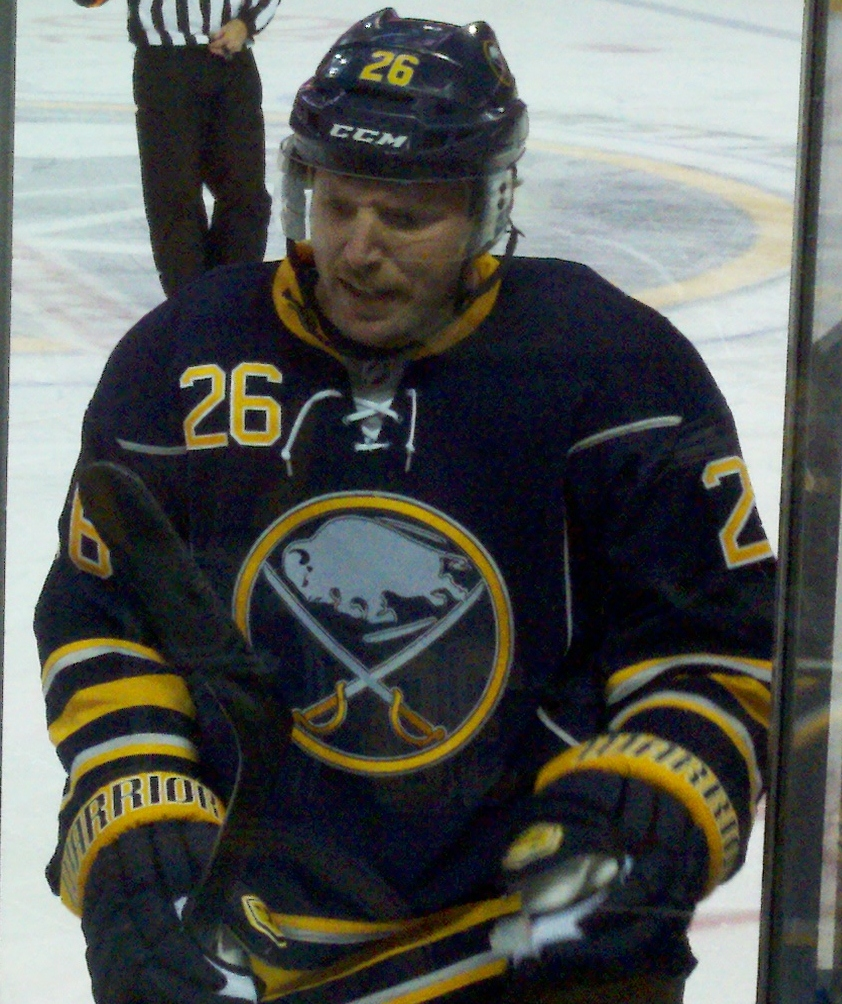
Thomas Vanek

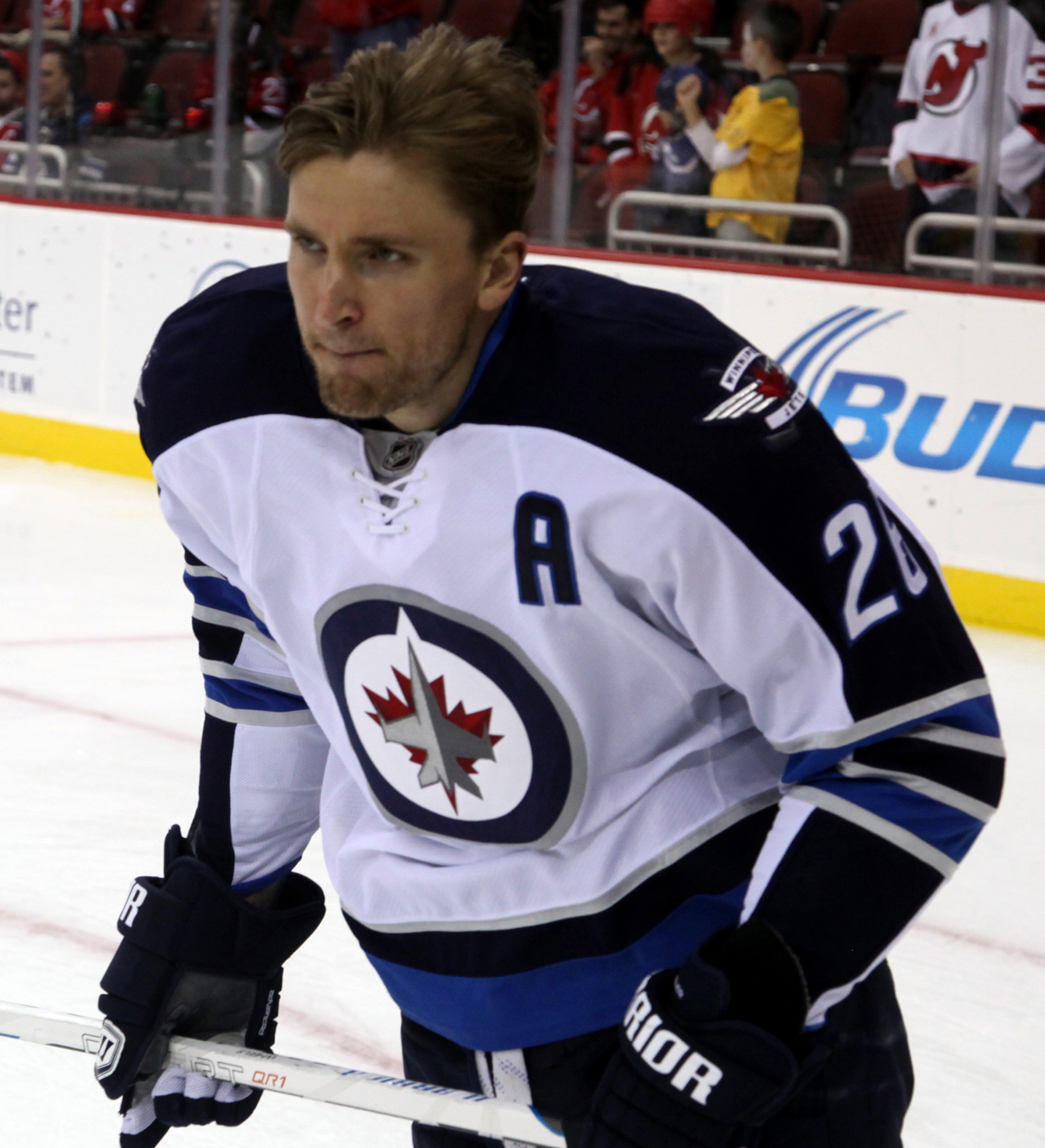
Blake Wheeler

=== WHA ===
Several players also were members of WHA teams.

Player	Position	Team(s)	Years	Avco Cups
Mike Antonovich	Center	MFS, EDM, NEW	1972–1979	0
Brad Buetow	Left Wing	CLC	1973–1974	0
Bill Butters	Defense	MFS, HOU, EDM, NEW	1974–1978	0
Gary Gambucci	Center	MFS	1974–1976	0
Paul Holmgren	Forward	MFS	1975–1976	0
Jack McCartan	Goaltender	MFS	1972–1975	0
Joe Micheletti	Defenseman	CAC, EDM	1976–1979	0
Warren Miller	Forward	CAC, EDM, QUE, NEW	1975–1979	0
Wally Olds	Defenseman	NYD, CAC	1972–1976	0
Dick Paradise	Defenseman	MFS	1972–1974	0
Frank Sanders	Defenseman	MFS	1972–1973	0
Craig Sarner	Right wing	MFS	1975–1976	0
Buzz Schneider	Left Wing	BIR	1976–1977	0
John Sheridan	Center	IND	1974–1976	0
Pat Westrum	Center	MFS, CAC, BIR	1974–1978	0
