= Suncoast Suns =

American minor league professional ice hockey team (1971–1973)

- City: St. Petersburg, Florida
- League: EHL (1971–1973); SHL (1973)
- Operated: 1971–1973
- Home arena: Bayfront Center
- Colors: Green, white, orange, yellow
- Affiliates: Los Angeles Kings (1972–73); Minnesota Fighting Saints (1973); New England Whalers (1973)

The Suncoast Suns was a minor league professional ice hockey team based in St. Petersburg, Florida, and played home games at the Bayfront Center. The Suns began in the Eastern Hockey League in 1971, and was a founding member of the Southern Hockey League in 1973. The Suns ceased operations in December 1973, partway through its third season.

== History ==
The Suns franchise was started by a group of businessmen who wanted a team in the Raleigh, North Carolina area, but chose St. Petersburg instead due to a suitable arena. The name Suncoast Suns was selected by a panel of judges in July 1971 including Jack Russell and Al Lopez because it represented the Tampa Bay area.

The Suns became the first permanent professional hockey team in the Florida Suncoast area. Lloyd Hinchberger was the team's coach in the first two seasons. Actor James Garner later owned a part interest in the team.

The team debuted on October 14, 1971 against the Greensboro Generals. In the 1971–72 season, the Suns won 27 games in the regular season, finished fourth place in the southern division, and lost in the first round of the playoffs to the Charlotte Checkers in six games. The Charlotte Observer named team captain Gregg Pilling as the player of the year, and Hinchberger as coach of the year. Goaltender Billy Yeo was named a first team all-star.

The Suns affiliated with the Los Angeles Kings for the 1972–73 season. The Suns won 30 games in the regular season, finished third place in the southern division, and lost in the first round of the playoffs to the Roanoke Valley Rebels in five games.

In May 1973, the Suns and other southern division teams withdrew from the Eastern Hockey League and founded the Southern Hockey League, due to travel costs of going to northern arenas, and other regulations such as dressing only 14 players for games. Team ownership changed to a local group led by Steve Kirby and Charles Mackey, who hired Paul Caron was hired as general manager, and Larry Kish as the club's new coach. The Suns affiliated with the Minnesota Fighting Saints and the New England Whalers for the 1973–74 Southern Hockey League season. The Suns were experiencing financial issues, declining attendance, and some of the team's owners preferred to lure the Jersey Knights to town instead of the SHL team. The Suns ceased operations 31 games into the 72-game schedule, and folded on December 19, 1973.

== Notable players ==
Notable Suns players that also played in the National Hockey League or World Hockey Association:

- Bill Berglund
- Bob Boyd
- Jerry Engele
- Ed Kea
- Darrel Knibbs
- Dale Lewis
- Leonard Lilyholm
- Dan Lodboa
- Jack McCartan
- Cliff Pennington
- Terry Ryan
- Blaine Rydman
- Gary Sittler
- George Standing
- Peter Sullivan

== Results ==
Season-by-season results:

Season	Lge	GP	W	L	T	Pts	Pct	GF	GA	PIM	Standing	Playoffs
1971–72	EHL	73	27	34	12	66	0.452	248	291	1161	4th, Southern	Lost in round 1
1972–73	EHL	76	30	37	9	69	0.454	301	365	1272	3rd, Southern	Lost in round 1
1973–74	SHL	31	9	22	0	18	0.290	123	176	502	6th, SHL	Folded
TOTALS		180	66	93	21	153	0.425	672	832	2935		
