= List of Big Ten men's ice hockey champions =

The following is a list of men's ice hockey champions of the Big Ten Conference, including champions of the conference's playoff tournament.

== Championships by season ==
Season	Regular season champion	Conference tournament champion	Notes
2013–14	Minnesota	Wisconsin	Big Ten men's ice hockey play begins with Michigan, Michigan State, Minnesota, Ohio State, Penn State and Wisconsin
2014–15	Minnesota	Minnesota	
2015–16	Minnesota	Michigan	
2016–17	Minnesota	Penn State	
2017–18	Notre Dame	Notre Dame	Notre Dame joins Big Ten hockey.
2018–19	Ohio State	Notre Dame	
2019–20	Penn State	Tournament canceled due to the COVID-19 pandemic	
2020–21	Wisconsin	Minnesota	
2021–22	Minnesota	Michigan	
2022–23	Minnesota	Michigan	
2023–24	Michigan State	Michigan State	
2024–25	Minnesota / Michigan State	Michigan State	
2025–26	Michigan State	Michigan	

== Championships by school ==
School	Big Ten Regular Season Championships	Last Big Ten Regular Season Championship	Big Ten Tournament Championships	Last Big Ten Tournament Championship
Michigan	0	—	4	2026
Michigan State	3	2026	2	2025
Minnesota	7	2025	2	2021
Notre Dame	1	2018	2	2019
Ohio State	1	2019	0	—
Penn State	1	2020	1	2017
Wisconsin	1	2021	1	2014
