= Darrel Knibbs =

Canadian ice hockey player

- Born: September 21, 1949 (age 76) Medicine Hat, Alberta, Canada
- Height: 6 ft 1 in (185 cm)
- Weight: 185 lb (84 kg; 13 st 3 lb)
- Position: Centre
- Played for: Chicago Cougars (WHA ) Muskegon Mohawks (IHL); Rhode Island Eagles (EHL); Suncoast Suns (SHL); HC Salzburg (Austria)
- NHL draft: 84th overall, 1969; Montreal Canadiens
- Playing career: 1969–1975

Darrel Duane Knibbs aka "The Nibbler" aka "The Scrib Nibbler" (born September 21, 1949) is a Canadian former professional ice hockey player. He was selected by the Montreal Canadiens in the 10th round (84th overall) of the 1969 NHL Amateur Draft.

Knibbs played 41 games in the World Hockey Association with the 1972-73 Chicago Cougars.

== Career statistics ==
=== Regular season and playoffs ===
			Regular season					Playoffs
Season	Team	League	GP	G	A	Pts	PIM	GP	G	A	Pts	PIM
1967–68	Lethbridge Sugar Kings	AJHL	Statistics Unavailable
1969–70	Muskegon Mohawks	IHL	50	23	27	50	12	6	3	2	5	2
1970–71	Muskegon Mohawks	IHL	68	37	56	93	21	6	3	1	4	0
1971–72	Muskegon Mohawks	IHL	71	42	33	75	12	11	4	5	9	2
1972–73	Rhode Island Eagles	EHL	32	24	22	46	5	4	1	0	1	5
1972–73	Chicago Cougars	WHA	41	3	8	11	0	––	––	––	––	––
1973–74	Muskegon Mohawks	IHL	34	13	9	22	4	3	1	1	2	0
1973–74	Suncoast Suns	SHL	29	12	20	32	6	––	––	––	––	––
WHA totals			41	3	8	11	0	—	—	—	—	—
