= Bill Berglund =

American former ice hockey goaltender (born 1945)

- Born: September 24, 1945 (age 80) Everett, Massachusetts, USA
- Height: 6 ft 1 in (185 cm)
- Weight: 194 lb (88 kg; 13 st 12 lb)
- Position: Goaltender
- Played for: New England Whalers
- Playing career: 1971–1975

Bill Berglund (born September 24, 1945) is an American former ice hockey goaltender who played five games in the World Hockey Association for the New England Whalers.

== Biography ==
Berglund played college hockey with Boston State College before turning spending one year in the United States Hockey League for the Green Bay Bobcats. He turned pro in 1972 in the Eastern Hockey League with the New England Blades and the Rhode Island Eagles. He also played in the Southern Hockey League for the Suncoast Suns and the American Hockey League for the Jacksonville Barons before making his debut for the Whalers in the 1973–74 WHA season, playing three games in all. He played North American Hockey League for the Cape Codders before playing two more games for the Whalers during the 1974–75 WHA season which turned out to be his last pro season before retiring.

Berglund went on to become an assistant coach at both Northeastern University and Boston University. He also worked as a scout for the Montreal Canadiens.

== Career statistics ==
=== Regular season and playoffs ===
			Regular season									Playoffs
Season	Team	League	GP	W	L	T	MIN	GA	SO	GAA	SV%	GP	W	L	MIN	GA	SO	GAA	SV%
1967–68	Boston State College	ECAC-2	21	0	0	0	—	77	0	3.52	—	—	—	—	—	—	—	—	—
1968–69	Boston State College	ECAC-2	15	0	0	0	—	61	0	4.15	—	—	—	—	—	—	—	—	—
1969–70	Boston State College	ECAC-2	0	0	0	0	0	0	0	0	0	—	—	—	—	—	—	—	—
1969–70	Concord Eastern Olympics	NEnHL	3	0	0	0	—	11	0	3.67	—	—	—	—	—	—	—	—	—
1970–71	Green Bay Bobcats	USHL	12	—	—	—	—	49	0	4.16	—	—	—	—	—	—	—	—	—
1971–72	Concord Eastern Olympics	NEnHL	Statistics Unavailable
1972–73	New England Blades	EHL	7	0	0	0	—	35	0	5.00	—	—	—	—	—	—	—	—	—
1972–73	Rhode Island Eagles	EHL	5	0	0	0	—	15	0	3.26	—	—	—	—	—	—	—	—	—
1973–74	Jacksonville Barons	AHL	2	0	0	0	71	11	0	9.32	—	—	—	—	—	—	—	—	—
1973–74	New England Whalers	WHA	3	2	1	0	180	10	0	3.33	.885	—	—	—	—	—	—	—	—
1973–74	Suncoast Suns	SHL	16	7	8	0	913	71	0	4.67	.879	—	—	—	—	—	—	—	—
1974–75	New England Whalers	WHA	2	0	0	0	36	3	0	5.00	.813	—	—	—	—	—	—	—	—
1974–75	Cape Codders	NAHL	13	2	10	0	705	50	0	4.25	—	—	—	—	—	—	—	—	—
WHA totals			5	2	1	0	216	13	0	3.61	.874	—	—	—	—	—	—	—	—
