= Dale Lewis (ice hockey) =

Canadian ice hockey player

- Born: July 28, 1951 (age 73); Edmonton, Alberta, Canada
- Height: 6 ft 0 in (183 cm)
- Weight: 190 lb (86 kg; 13 st 8 lb)
- Position: Left wing
- Shot: Left
- Played for: New York Rangers
- NHL draft: Undrafted
- Playing career: 1972–1981

Robert Dale Lewis (born July 28, 1952) is a Canadian former professional ice hockey player. He played eight games in the National Hockey League with the New York Rangers during the 1975–76 season. The rest of his career, which lasted from 1972 to 1981, was spent in the minor leagues.

== Career statistics ==
=== Regular season and playoffs ===
			Regular season					Playoffs
Season	Team	League	GP	G	A	Pts	PIM	GP	G	A	Pts	PIM
1971–72	Red Deer Rustlers	AJHL	48	36	42	78	99	12	8	9	17	23
1971–72	Vancouver Nats	WCHL	2	0	1	1	2	—	—	—	—	—
1972–73	Suncoast Suns	EHL	76	32	43	75	51	5	4	3	7	2
1973–74	Portland Buckaroos	WHL	72	18	18	36	38	10	2	7	9	8
1974–75	Springfield Indians	AHL	74	28	43	71	43	17	9	12	21	8
1975–76	New York Rangers	NHL	8	0	0	0	0	—	—	—	—	—
1975–76	Providence Reds	AHL	65	14	27	41	37	3	1	1	2	0
1976–77	New Haven Nighthawks	AHL	80	25	45	70	10	6	4	1	5	2
1977–78	New Haven Nighthawks	AHL	80	19	29	48	20	15	6	4	10	2
1978–79	New Haven Nighthawks	AHL	76	29	51	80	20	10	2	2	4	2
1979–80	Birmingham Bulls	CHL	78	28	33	61	30	4	2	5	7	0
1980–81	Birmingham Bulls	CHL	12	5	9	14	13	—	—	—	—	—
1980–81	New Haven Nighthawks	AHL	63	13	26	39	14	4	2	1	3	0
AHL totals			438	128	221	349	144	55	24	21	45	14
NHL totals			8	0	0	0	0	—	—	—	—	—
