= Bill Butters =

American ice hockey player (b. 1951)

- Born: January 10, 1951 (age 74); Saint Paul, Minnesota, USA
- Height: 5 ft 10 in (178 cm)
- Weight: 185 lb (84 kg; 13 st 3 lb)
- Position: Defense
- Shot: Right
- Played for: Minnesota Fighting Saints; Houston Aeros; Edmonton Oilers; New England Whalers; Minnesota North Stars
- NHL draft: Undrafted
- WHA draft: Undrafted
- Playing career: 1973–1980

Bill Butters (born January 10, 1951) is a retired American professional ice hockey player. He competed in the World Hockey Association (WHA) between 1975 and 1978, followed by a stint in the National Hockey League (NHL) from 1978 to 1979. After retiring from playing, Butters transitioned into coaching, spending several years as an assistant coach with the University of Minnesota before continuing his coaching career at the NCAA Division III level and in high school hockey.

== Life and career ==
Butters was born on January 10, 1951, in Saint Paul, Minnesota, and played his high school hockey in White Bear Lake, Minnesota. He continued his hockey career at the University of Minnesota from 1971 to 1973, where he was coached by Glen Sonmor and Herb Brooks, and served as team captain during the 1972–73 season. Butters later played 217 games in the World Hockey Association (WHA), suiting up for the Minnesota Fighting Saints, Houston Aeros, Edmonton Oilers, and New England Whalers. He also appeared in 72 National Hockey League (NHL) games with the Minnesota North Stars.

In 1980, after concluding his professional playing career, Butters dedicated his time to mentoring young athletes by joining Christian Hockey Camps International. The camps, operated by Hockey Ministries International, provide a platform for players to develop both their hockey skills and their Christian faith.

Between 2010 and 2012, Butters served as an assistant coach for the University of Wisconsin Badgers. He later resigned from this role to resume his work with the Ministries.

== Career statistics ==
=== Regular season and playoffs ===
			Regular season					Playoffs
Season	Team	League	GP	G	A	Pts	PIM	GP	G	A	Pts	PIM
1966–67	White Bear High School	HS-MN	—	—	—	—	—	—	—	—	—	—
1970–71	University of Minnesota	WCHA	27	0	1	1	52	—	—	—	—	—
1971–72	University of Minnesota	WCHA	29	1	9	10	100	—	—	—	—	—
1972–73	University of Minnesota	WCHA	33	3	6	9	110	—	—	—	—	—
1973–74	Oklahoma City Blazers	CHL	71	7	18	25	174	10	2	4	6	37
1974–75	Minnesota Fighting Saints	WHA	24	2	2	4	58	12	1	0	1	21
1974–75	Oklahoma City Blazers	CHL	32	5	9	14	192	—	—	—	—	—
1975–76	Minnesota Fighting Saints	WHA	59	0	15	15	170	—	—	—	—	—
1975–76	Houston Aeros	WHA	14	0	4	4	18	17	0	3	3	51
1976–77	Minnesota Fighting Saints	WHA	42	0	7	7	133	—	—	—	—	—
1976–77	Edmonton Oilers	WHA	7	0	2	2	17	—	—	—	—	—
1976–77	New England Whalers	WHA	26	1	8	9	65	5	0	1	1	15
1977–78	New England Whalers	WHA	45	1	13	14	69	—	—	—	—	—
1977–78	Minnesota North Stars	NHL	23	1	0	1	30	—	—	—	—	—
1978–79	Minnesota North Stars	NHL	49	0	4	4	47	—	—	—	—	—
1978–79	Oklahoma City Stars	CHL	14	1	2	3	31	—	—	—	—	—
1979–80	Oklahoma City Stars	CHL	73	3	8	11	134	—	—	—	—	—
WHA totals			217	4	51	55	530	34	1	4	5	87
NHL totals			72	1	4	5	77	—	—	—	—	—
