= Leonard Lilyholm =

American ice hockey player (1941–2024)

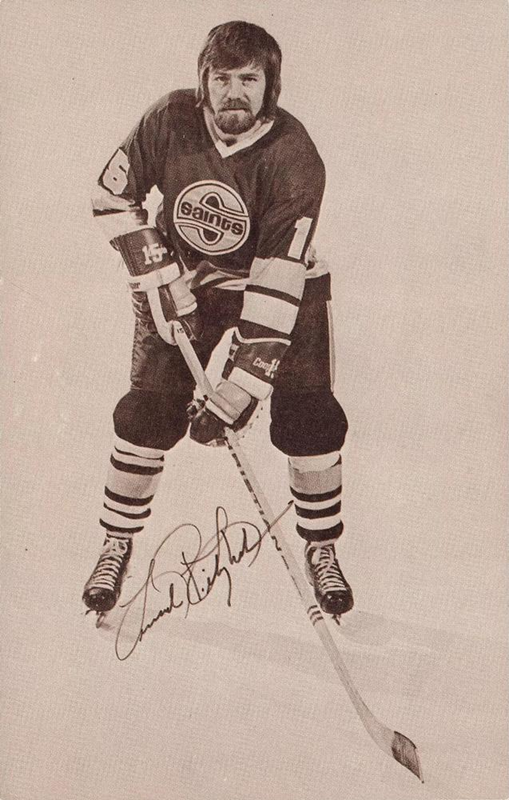
- Lilyholm in 1972 photo
- Born: April 1, 1941 Robbinsdale, Minnesota, U.S.
- Died: December 28, 2024 (aged 83) Worth County, Iowa, U.S.
- Height: 5 ft 8 in (173 cm)
- Weight: 163 lb (74 kg; 11 st 9 lb)
- Position: Right wing
- Shot: Right
- Played for: Minnesota Fighting Saints
- National team: United States
- Playing career: 1966–1974

Leonard Paul Lilyholm (April 1, 1941 – December 28, 2024) was an American professional ice hockey player who played 77 regular season games in the World Hockey Association for the Minnesota Fighting Saints in 1972 and 1973.

== Early life ==
Lilyholm was born in Robbinsdale, Minnesota. Lilyholm graduated from the University of Minnesota in 1966 and played on the Minnesota Golden Gophers men's ice hockey team. As an amateur, he frequently played for the United States men's national ice hockey team.

== Career ==
Lilyholm was a member of Team USA at the 1968 Winter Olympics and the 1966, 1967, 1970, 1971, and 1974 Ice Hockey World Championships.

Outside hockey, Len Lilyholm was an architect and builder who participated in the design of the St. Paul Civic Center, the Saints' new home arena which was completed in January 1973. He appeared as a hockey coach in Ice Castles, a 1978 romantic drama film.

== Death ==
Lilyholm died at the age of 83 in a head-on traffic collision along with his wife, Carol, on Interstate 35 in Worth County, Iowa on December 28, 2024. Lilyholm, the driver, crossed over the median and drove southbound in the northbound lanes before hitting another car head-on. The driver of the other vehicle was also killed. Everyone involved in the crash, including Lilyholm and his wife, were wearing their seatbelts.

== Career statistics ==
=== Regular season and playoffs ===
| | | | Regular season | | | | | Playoffs |
| Season | Team | League | GP | G | A | Pts | PIM | GP | G | A | Pts | PIM |
|---|---|---|---|---|---|---|---|---|---|---|---|---|
| 1960–61 | University of Minnesota | WCHA | Statistics Unavailable |
| 1961–62 | University of Minnesota | WCHA | Statistics Unavailable |
| 1962–63 | University of Minnesota | WCHA | 30 | 3 | 26 | 29 | 8 | — | — | — | — | — |
| 1965–66 | Rochester Mustangs | USHL | 24 | 11 | 30 | 41 | 0 | — | — | — | — | — |
| 1965–66 | U.S. National Team | Intl | Statistics Unavailable |
| 1966–67 | U.S. National Team | Intl | Statistics Unavailable |
| 1966–67 | Rochester Mustangs | USHL | 20 | 5 | 18 | 23 | 8 | — | — | — | — | — |
| 1967–68 | U.S. Olympic Team | Intl | Statistics Unavailable |
| 1967–68 | Rochester Mustangs | USHL | –– | 5 | 4 | 9 | 6 | — | — | — | — | — |
| 1969–70 | Rochester Mustangs | USHL | –– | 11 | 11 | 22 | 26 | — | — | — | — | — |
| 1969–70 | U.S. National Team | Intl | 13 | 11 | 16 | 27 | 4 | — | — | — | — | — |
| 1970–71 | U.S. National Team | Intl | 12 | 2 | 3 | 5 | 8 | — | — | — | — | — |
| 1972–73 | Minnesota Fighting Saints | WHA | 77 | 8 | 13 | 21 | 37 | 6 | 1 | 0 | 1 | 0 |
| 1973–74 | Suncoast Suns | SHL | 7 | 0 | 1 | 1 | 9 | — | — | — | — | — |
| WHA totals | | | 77 | 8 | 13 | 21 | 37 | 6 | 1 | 0 | 1 | 0 |
