= Blaine Rydman =

Canadian ice hockey player

- Born: December 16, 1949 (age 76) Weyburn, Saskatchewan, Canada
- Height: 6 ft 2 in (188 cm)
- Weight: 195 lb (88 kg; 13 st 13 lb)
- Position: Defence
- Shot: Left
- Played for: WHA; New York Raiders; Minnesota Fighting Saints; AHL; Baltimore Clippers; EHL; Charlotte Checkers; New Haven Blades; Long Island Ducks
- NHL draft: Undrafted
- Playing career: 1970–1982

Blaine Rydman (born December 16, 1949) is a Canadian former professional ice hockey defenceman.

During the 1972–73 and 1973–74 seasons, Rydman played 39 games in the World Hockey Association with the New York Raiders and Minnesota Fighting Saints.

== Career statistics ==
			Regular season					Playoffs
Season	Team	League	GP	G	A	Pts	PIM	GP	G	A	Pts	PIM
1966–67	Weyburn Red Wings	CMJHL	10	0	2	2	0	—	—	—	—	—
1967–68	Weyburn Red Wings	WCHL	55	2	12	14	54	—	—	—	—	—
1969–70	Estevan Bruins	WCHL	51	5	19	24	214	—	—	—	—	—
1970–71	Baltimore Clippers	AHL	3	0	0	0	2	—	—	—	—	—
1970–71	Long Island Ducks	EHL-Sr.	58	2	15	17	219	—	—	—	—	—
1971–72	Charlotte Checkers	EHL-Sr.	70	13	29	42	333	7	0	0	0	57
1972–73	Charlotte Checkers	EHL-Sr.	18	1	5	6	73	—	—	—	—	—
1972–73	Long Island Ducks	EHL-Sr.	16	2	7	9	23	—	—	—	—	—
1972–73	New York Raiders	WHA	2	0	0	0	4	—	—	—	—	—
1972–73	Minnesota Fighting Saints	WHA	29	0	1	1	65	1	0	0	0	0
1973–74	Minnesota Fighting Saints	WHA	8	0	0	0	21	—	—	—	—	—
1973–74	Suncoast Suns	SHL-Sr.	31	1	9	10	116	—	—	—	—	—
1973–74	Winston-Salem Polar Twins	SHL-Sr.	8	0	1	1	2	7	0	1	1	2
1974–75	Winston-Salem Polar Twins	SHL-Sr.	72	17	35	52	196	7	0	2	2	21
1975–76	Cape Cod Codders	NAHL-Sr.	44	3	12	15	76	—	—	—	—	—
1975–76	Erie Blades	NAHL-Sr.	18	0	5	5	60	5	0	1	1	24
1976–77	Erie Blades	NAHL-Sr.	37	4	11	15	49	—	—	—	—	—
1976–77	Winston-Salem Polar Twins	SHL-Sr.	4	0	1	1	0	—	—	—	—	—
1981–82	Winston-Salem Thunderbirds	ACHL	4	0	1	1	0	—	—	—	—	—
WHA totals			39	0	1	1	90	1	0	0	0	0
EHL-Sr. totals			162	18	56	74	648	7	0	0	0	57
SHL-Sr. totals			115	18	46	64	314	14	0	3	3	23
