= Frank Sanders (ice hockey) =

American ice hockey player

- Born: March 8, 1949 (age 77) St. Paul, Minnesota, USA
- Died: February 17, 2012 (aged 62) Woodbury, Minnesota, USA
- Height: 6 ft 3 in (191 cm)
- Weight: 230 lb (104 kg; 16 st 6 lb)
- Position: Defence
- Shot: Right
- Played for: WHA; Minnesota Fighting Saints
- Playing career: 1970–1973

Frank Sanders
Medal record

Men's ice hockey

Representing United States

Olympic Games
| Silver medal – second place | 1972 Sapporo | Team |

Franklyn Bonn Sanders (March 8, 1949 – February 17, 2012) was an American professional ice hockey player who made 76 regular season game appearances for the WHA Minnesota Fighting Saints in the 1972–73 season. He retired after the season to become a pastor.

== Early life ==
Born in Oakdale, Minnesota, he is perhaps best known for being a member of the United States hockey team that won a silver medal in the 1972 Olympic Winter Games in Sapporo, Japan.

== Career ==
Sanders also played on the 1969 WCHA champion Minnesota Gophers hockey team and was captain of the 1970–71 team. He was awarded the John Mariucci Most Valuable Player Award that year.

After turning down an offer by the Boston Bruins in order to play for the Olympics, Sanders was later signed by his hometown team, the Minnesota Fighting Saints. The Saints were a charter member of the upstart World Hockey Association, a professional league that was challenging the NHL hockey empire.

Sanders was known for his tough play and fighting ability. At the end of his first season, he unexpectedly quit playing hockey to pursue life in the ministry. Until his death, he was pastor at Spirit of Life Bible Church in Woodbury, Minnesota.

In November 2011, he published his autobiography titled From Silver to Gold in which he tells of about his experiences playing hockey and his sudden decision to walk away from his pro career. He died in Woodbury, Minnesota in February 2012.

== Career statistics ==
=== Regular season and playoffs ===
| | | | Regular season | | | | | Playoffs |
| Season | Team | League | GP | G | A | Pts | PIM | GP | G | A | Pts | PIM |
|---|---|---|---|---|---|---|---|---|---|---|---|---|
| 1970–71 | University of Minnesota | WCHA | Statistics Unavailable |
| 1971–72 | U.S. Olympic Team | Intl | 47 | 5 | 11 | 16 | 68 | — | — | — | — | — |
| 1972–73 | Minnesota Fighting Saints | WHA | 76 | 8 | 8 | 16 | 94 | 5 | 0 | 1 | 1 | 0 |
| WHA totals | | | 76 | 8 | 8 | 16 | 94 | 5 | 0 | 1 | 1 | 0 |
