= List of Cincinnati Stingers players =

This is a list of players who have played at least one game for the Cincinnati Stingers of the World Hockey Association from 1975–76 to 1978–79.

== A ==
Bruce Abbey, Dennis Abgrall, Jeff Allan, Steve Andrascik, Serge Aubry

== B ==
Terry Ball, Bryon Baltimore, Frank Beaton, Serge Beaudoin, Mike Byers

== C ==
Bryan Campbell, Jacques Caron, Greg Carroll, Gordie Clark, Brian Coates, Rich Coutu

== D ==
Kelly Davis, Butch Deadmarsh, Dave Debol, Michel Dion, Pat Donnelly, Dave Dornseif, Rick Dudley

== F ==
Dave Forbes, Robbie Ftorek

== G ==
Mike Gartner, Ed Gilbert, Bill Gilligan, Bruce Greig, Pierre Guite

== H ==
Del Hall, Alf Handrahan, Hugh Harris, Jamie Hislop, Paul Hoganson, John Hughes

== I ==
Dave Inkpen

== J ==
Dan Justin

== K ==
John Kiely

== L ==
Floyd Lahache, Normand LaPointe, Claude Larose, Rich Leduc, Barry Legge, Mike Liut, Jacques Locas, Ted Long, Chuck Luksa

== M ==
Bernie MacNeil, Darryl Maggs, Gilles Marotte, Peter Marsh, Bryan Maxwell, John McKenzie, Gerry Meehan, Barry Melrose, Mark Messier, Murray Myers

== N ==
Craig Norwich

== O ==
Don O'Donoghue, Francois Ouimet

== P ==
Michel Parizeau, Mike Pelyk, Ron Plumb

== R ==
Pierre Roy

== S ==
Ron Serafini, Sean Shanahan, Byron Shutt, Dale Smedsmo, Dennis Sobchuk, Gene Sobchuk, Claude St. Sauveur, Pat Stapleton, Bill Steele, Paul Stewart, Blaine Stoughton

== T ==
Reg Thomas, Willie Trognitz

== V ==
Gary Veneruzzo

== W ==
Ernie Wakely, Bryan Watson
