= Hampton Gulls =

Former American minor league professional ice hockey team

- City: Hampton, Virginia
- League: SHL (1974–1977); AHL (1977–78)
- Operated: 1974–1978
- Home arena: Hampton Coliseum
- Colors: Black, white, gold
- Head coach: John Brophy
- Affiliates: Cincinnati Stingers; Minnesota Fighting Saints; Edmonton Oilers

Franchise history
- 1974: Fayetteville Arsenal
- 1974–78: Hampton Gulls

Championships
- Regular season titles: One (1976–77)

The Hampton Gulls were an American minor league professional ice hockey team based in Hampton, Virginia, from 1974 to 1978 at the Hampton Coliseum. The Gulls played three seasons in the Southern Hockey League, beginning in 1974. When that league folded in 1977, the Hampton played one season in the American Hockey League. The Gulls were a farm team to the Cincinnati Stingers of the World Hockey Association each season. John Brophy was the team's only head coach during its existence. Hampton ceased operations on February 10, 1978, part way through its fourth season.

== History ==
The franchise originated as an expansion team for the 1974–75 Southern Hockey League season in Fayetteville, North Carolina. The new team was named after the Fayetteville Arsenal, and was scheduled to play at the Cumberland County Memorial Arena. In October 1974, owner Bill Raue moved the team before playing any games, when availability of home ice dates became a problem, and the Hampton Coliseum was available. Claude Chartre led the team in scoring with 112 points, and Lorne Rombough led with 56 goals. Hampton finished the season in second place behind the Charlotte Checkers, and lost to the Checkers in a six-game playoff final.

Before the 1975–76 Southern Hockey League season, the team was purchased by Charles Wornom, a city councillor and future mayor of Hampton, Virginia, for $40,000. The season saw the Gulls sharing the greater Hampton Roads area with the Tidewater Sharks, another SHL team in Norfolk, Virginia. Art Stratton led the team in scoring with 78 points, and Larry Billows led with 29 goals. Similar to the previous regular season, the Gulls finished second behind the Checkers. They faced the Checkers in the playoff finals again, losing in five games.

In the 1976–77 Southern Hockey League season, Hampton was affiliated with both the Cincinnati Stingers and the Minnesota Fighting Saints. The Gulls were in first place when the Southern Hockey League collapsed in January 1977. Claude Chartre led the team in scoring with 58 points, and Pat Donnelly led with 23 goals.

Following the SHL's collapse, the Gulls joined the American Hockey League for the 1977–78 AHL season, and affiliated with the Edmonton Oilers in addition to Cincinnati. Paul O'Neil led the team in scoring with 44 points, and Danny Arndt led with 20 goals. Hampton was in last place in the AHL when the franchise folded after 46 games due to financial issues.

== Results ==
Season-by-season results:

Season	League	Games	Won	Lost	Tied	Points	Winning Pct (%)	Goals for	Goals against	Standing	Playoffs
1974–75	SHL	72	43	28	1	87	0.604	323	262	2nd, SHL	Lost in finals
1975–76	SHL	72	33	23	16	82	0.569	262	234	2nd, SHL	Lost in finals
1976–77	SHL	50	32	16	2	66	0.660	198	152	1st, SHL	League folded
1977–78	AHL	46	15	28	3	33	0.359	142	171	5th, South	Team folded
TOTALS		240	123	95	22	268	0.558	925	819		

== Notable players ==
Rod Langway played with the Hampton Gulls in the 1977–78 AHL season, and was later inducted into the Hockey Hall of Fame.

Notable Gulls players that also played in the National Hockey League or World Hockey Association:

- Bruce Abbey
- Jeff Allan
- Steve Alley
- Steve Andrascik
- Danny Arndt
- Frank Beaton
- Larry Bolonchuk
- Michel Boudreau
- Curt Brackenbury
- Jeff Carlson
- Claude Chartre
- Brian Coates
- Alain Cote
- Richard Coutu
- Pat Donnelly
- Denis Dupere
- Mike Dwyer
- Andre Gill
- Bill Gilligan
- Dave Gorman
- David Hanson
- Derek Harker
- Jamie Hislop
- Paul Hoganson
- Bob Johnson
- Kevin Kemp
- John Kiely
- Mike Korney
- Pierre Lagace
- Floyd Lahache
- Gord Lane
- Rod Langway
- Norm LaPointe
- Roger Lemelin
- Jacques Locas
- Ted Long
- Jim McElmury
- Bill McKenzie
- Eddie Mio
- Ron Morgan
- Wayne Mosdell
- Murray Myers
- Cam Newton
- Don O'Donoghue
- Bill Oleschuk
- Wally Olds
- Paul O'Neil
- Francois Ouimet
- Glenn Patrick
- Randy Pierce
- Michel Plasse
- Kelly Pratt
- Bill Prentice
- Lorne Rombough
- Ted Scharf
- Buzz Schneider
- Ron Serafini
- Larry Skinner
- Dale Smedsmo
- Gene Sobchuk
- Bill Steele
- Bob Stephenson
- Art Stratton
- Paul Terbenche
- Hal Willis
