= Mike Keeler =

Canadian ice hockey player

- Born: May 21, 1950 (age 75) Toronto, Ontario, Canada
- Height: 5 ft 10 in (178 cm)
- Weight: 195 lb (88 kg; 13 st 13 lb)
- Position: Defence
- Shot: Right
- Played for: New England Whalers (WHA)
- NHL draft: 71st overall, 1970; Buffalo Sabres
- Playing career: 1970–1979

Mike Keeler (born May 21, 1950) is a Canadian former professional ice hockey defenceman. He was drafted by the Buffalo Sabres of the National Hockey League in the sixth round, 71st overall, of the 1970 NHL Entry Draft; however, he never played in that league. He played two games in the World Hockey Association with the New England Whalers in the 1973–74 season.

== Career statistics ==
			Regular season					Playoffs
Season	Team	League	GP	G	A	Pts	PIM	GP	G	A	Pts	PIM
1966–67	Niagara Falls Flyers	OHA-Jr.	43	2	3	5	48	—	—	—	—	—
1967–68	Niagara Falls Flyers	OHA-Jr.	49	3	17	20	76	—	—	—	—	—
1968–69	Niagara Falls Flyers	OHA-Jr.	35	2	12	14	93	—	—	—	—	—
1969–70	Niagara Falls Flyers	OHA-Jr.	54	14	26	40	108	—	—	—	—	—
1970–71	Charlotte Checkers	EHL-Sr.	56	11	28	39	33	13	6	10	16	23
1971–72	Springfield Kings	AHL	28	2	5	7	36	5	2	0	2	0
1971–72	Cincinnati Swords	AHL	24	0	5	5	34	—	—	—	—	—
1972–73	Springfield Kings	AHL	20	4	10	14	20	—	—	—	—	—
1972–73	Portland Buckaroos	WHL-Sr.	38	4	11	15	51	—	—	—	—	—
1973–74	New England Whalers	WHA	1	0	0	0	0	1	0	0	0	0
1973–74	Jacksonville Barons	AHL	74	9	28	37	162	—	—	—	—	—
1974–75	Charlotte Checkers	SHL-Sr.	72	15	36	51	87	10	0	9	9	8
1975–76	Charlotte Checkers	SHL-Sr.	70	13	35	48	89	11	3	3	6	20
1976–77	Mohawk Valley Comets	NAHL-Sr.	19	2	3	5	15	4	0	3	3	5
1976–77	Charlotte Checkers	SHL-Sr.	48	14	19	33	67	—	—	—	—	—
1977–78	San Diego Mariners	PHL	41	8	13	21	51	—	—	—	—	—
1978–79	Tucson Rustlers	PHL	22	1	10	11	58	—	—	—	—	—
1978–79	Jersey/Hampton Aces	NEHL	29	6	17	23	50	—	—	—	—	—
WHA totals			1	0	0	0	0	1	0	0	0	0
AHL totals			146	15	48	63	252	5	2	0	2	0
SHL-Sr. totals			190	42	90	132	243	21	3	12	15	28
