= Steve Andrascik =

Canadian ice hockey player (1948–2024)

- Born: November 6, 1948 Sherridon, Manitoba, Canada
- Died: May 11, 2024 (aged 75) Delmar, Maryland, U.S.
- Height: 5 ft 11 in (180 cm)
- Weight: 190 lb (86 kg; 13 st 8 lb)
- Position: Right wing
- Shot: Right
- Played for: New York Rangers; Indianapolis Racers; Michigan Stags/Baltimore Blades; Cincinnati Stingers
- NHL draft: 11th overall, 1968; Detroit Red Wings
- Playing career: 1969–1978

Steven George Andrascik (November 6, 1948 – May 11, 2024) was a Canadian professional ice hockey right winger. He played one game in the National Hockey League (NHL) for the New York Rangers during the 1972 Stanley Cup playoffs, and 97 games in the World Hockey Association with the Indianapolis Racers, Michigan Stags/Baltimore Blades, and Cincinnati Stingers from 1974 to 1976.

== Playing career ==
Andrascik was born in Sherridon, Manitoba. He was drafted by the Detroit Red Wings of the National Hockey League (NHL) in the 1968 NHL Amateur Draft in the first round, eleventh overall. On November 1, 1970, the Red Wings traded Andrascik to the New York Rangers for Don Luce. After five years in the Central Hockey League and American Hockey League, Andrascik made it to the NHL for one game in the 1972 playoffs for the Rangers, on April 23, 1972, against the Chicago Black Hawks; he recorded no points and no penalty minutes.

About a year after playing his single NHL game, the Rangers traded him to the Pittsburgh Penguins. Instead of joining Pittsburgh, he joined the Indianapolis Racers of the World Hockey Association (WHA) for the 1974–75 season. Only 20 games into the season, he, along with Steve Richardson, were traded to the Michigan Stags for Jacques Locas and Brian McDonald. In the 1975–76 season, Andrascik played for yet another WHA team, the Cincinnati Stingers.

In total, Andrascik played one NHL game and 97 WHA games, scoring 9 goals, 13 assists, and 22 points. He died at an assisted living facility in Delmar, Maryland, on May 11, 2024, at the age of 75.

== Career statistics ==
=== Regular season and playoffs ===
			Regular season					Playoffs
Season	Team	League	GP	G	A	Pts	PIM	GP	G	A	Pts	PIM
1967–68	Flin Flon Bombers	WCHL	60	30	26	56	88	15	4	3	7	11
1968–69	Flin Flon Bombers	WCHL	50	32	36	68	142	18	7	8	15	51
1969–70	Fort Worth Wings	CHL	69	8	7	15	80	7	0	1	1	5
1970–71	Fort Worth Wings	CHL	8	2	1	3	23	—	—	—	—	—
1970–71	Omaha Knights	CHL	65	23	14	37	81	11	2	0	2	24
1971–72	Providence Reds	AHL	74	14	10	24	104	5	2	0	2	8
1971–72	New York Rangers	NHL	—	—	—	—	—	1	0	0	0	0
1972–73	Providence Reds	AHL	41	8	9	17	44	4	0	3	3	9
1973–74	Hershey Bears	AHL	70	23	43	66	36	14	3	7	10	44
1974–75	Indianapolis Racers	WHA	20	2	4	6	16	—	—	—	—	—
1974–75	Michigan Stags/Baltimore Blades	WHA	57	4	7	11	42	—	—	—	—	—
1974–75	Greensboro Generals	SHL	3	1	0	1	0	—	—	—	—	—
1975–76	Cincinnati Stingers	WHA	20	3	2	5	21	—	—	—	—	—
1975–76	Hampton Gulls	SHL	32	16	15	31	26	9	6	5	11	24
1976–77	Hershey Bears	AHL	79	16	23	39	59	6	1	1	2	11
1977–78	Hershey Bears	AHL	79	4	9	13	21	—	—	—	—	—
WHA totals			97	9	13	22	79	—	—	—	—	—
NHL totals			—	—	—	—	—	1	0	0	0	0

== See also ==
- List of players who played only one game in the NHL

Preceded by Ron Barkwell	Detroit Red Wings first-round draft pick 1968	Succeeded by Jim Rutherford
