= Danny Schock =

Canadian ice hockey player (1948–2017)

- Born: December 30, 1948 Terrace Bay, Ontario, Canada
- Died: June 15, 2017 (aged 68) Richmond, Virginia, U.S.
- Height: 5 ft 11 in (180 cm)
- Weight: 180 lb (82 kg; 12 st 12 lb)
- Position: Left wing
- Shot: Left
- Played for: Boston Bruins; Philadelphia Flyers
- NHL draft: 12th overall, 1968; Boston Bruins
- Playing career: 1968–1977

Daniel Patrick Schock (December 30, 1948 – June 15, 2017) was a Canadian professional ice hockey player who played 20 regular season games and one playoff game in the National Hockey League. He played with the Boston Bruins and Philadelphia Flyers. He won the Stanley Cup in 1970 with the Boston Bruins while playing one game in the playoffs, and had his name engraved on the Stanley Cup. Danny is the brother of Ron Schock.

== Career statistics ==
=== Regular season and playoffs ===
			Regular season					Playoffs
Season	Team	League	GP	G	A	Pts	PIM	GP	G	A	Pts	PIM
1965–66	St. Thomas Stars	WOJBHL	—	—	—	—	—	3	1	2	3	0
1966–67	Estevan Bruins	CMJHL	55	29	29	58	66	12	5	1	6	30
1967–68	Estevan Bruins	WCJHL	52	33	30	63	159	14	6	15	21	10
1967–68	Estevan Bruins	M-Cup	—	—	—	—	—	14	7	11	18	12
1968–69	Oklahoma City Blazers	CHL	66	20	32	52	52	12	3	6	9	21
1969–70	Oklahoma City Blazers	CHL	3	1	0	1	0	—	—	—	—	—
1969–70	Salt Lake Golden Eagles	WHL	55	20	18	38	18	—	—	—	—	—
1969–70	Boston Bruins	NHL	—	—	—	—	—	1	0	0	0	0
1970–71	Quebec Aces	AHL	7	2	1	3	0	—	—	—	—	—
1970–71	Boston Bruins	NHL	6	0	0	0	0	—	—	—	—	—
1970–71	Philadelphia Flyers	NHL	14	1	2	3	0	—	—	—	—	—
1971–72	Richmond Robins	AHL	74	24	17	41	36	—	—	—	—	—
1972–73	Richmond Robins	AHL	74	48	36	84	37	4	1	3	4	0
1973–74	Richmond Robins	AHL	54	23	28	51	8	5	0	2	2	0
1974–75	Syracuse Eagles	AHL	4	3	0	3	0	—	—	—	—	—
1974–75	Syracuse Blazers	NAHL	3	0	1	1	2	—	—	—	—	—
1974–75	Greensboro Generals	SHL	24	5	18	23	2	—	—	—	—	—
1976–77	Richmond Wildcats	SHL	1	0	0	0	0	—	—	—	—	—
AHL totals			213	100	82	182	81	9	1	5	6	0
NHL totals			20	1	2	3	0	1	0	0	0	0

Preceded by Meehan Bonnar	Boston Bruins first-round draft pick 1968	Succeeded by Don Tannahill
