= Don O'Donoghue =

Canadian ice hockey player

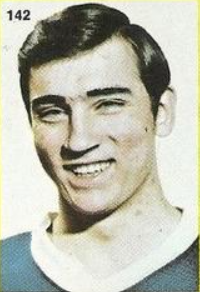
- O'Donoghue in 1971 photo
- Born: August 27, 1949 Kingston, Ontario, Canada
- Died: June 4, 2007 (aged 57) Gilroy, California, United States
- Height: 5 ft 10 in (178 cm)
- Weight: 181 lb (82 kg; 12 st 13 lb)
- Position: Right wing
- Shot: Left
- Played for: Cincinnati Stingers; Vancouver Blazers; Philadelphia Blazers; California Golden Seals; Oakland Seals
- NHL draft: 29th overall, 1969; Oakland Seals
- Playing career: 1969–1978

Donald Francis O'Donoghue (August 27, 1949 — June 4, 2007) was a Canadian professional ice hockey right wing who played 147 games in the National Hockey League for the Oakland Seals/California Golden Seals between 1969 and 1972. He would also play 125 games in the World Hockey Association for the Philadelphia Blazers, Vancouver Blazers and Cincinnati Stingers between 1972 and 1976.

== Playing career ==
O'Donoghue played junior for the St. Catharines Black Hawks of the Ontario Hockey Association. He was selected 29th overall by the Oakland Seals in the 1969 NHL Amateur Draft, and made his professional debut with the team that year. He spent parts of three seasons with the Seals, also playing for their American Hockey League affiliates.

Along with Boston Bruins defenseman Carol Vadnais, he was part of the February, 1972 trade that sent forward Reggie Leach and defensemen Rick Smith and Bob Stewart to the Golden Seals. He spent the remainder of the season in the minor leagues then signed with the rival WHA afterward. He played four seasons in the WHA, as well as three more in the minor leagues, before retiring in 1978.

== Post-playing career ==
In later life he ran a restaurant in California until his death from kidney cancer in 2007.

== Career statistics ==
=== Regular season and playoffs ===
			Regular season					Playoffs
Season	Team	League	GP	G	A	Pts	PIM	GP	G	A	Pts	PIM
1967–68	St. Catharines Black Hawks	OHA	54	5	15	20	12	5	0	1	1	2
1968–69	St. Catharines Black Hawks	OHA	45	9	21	30	61	18	4	3	7	32
1968–69	McMaster University	CIAU	—	—	—	—	—	—	—	—	—	—
1969–70	Oakland Seals	NHL	68	5	6	11	21	3	0	0	0	0
1970–71	California Golden Seals	NHL	43	11	9	20	10	—	—	—	—	—
1970–71	Providence Reds	AHL	25	9	8	17	20	—	—	—	—	—
1971–72	California Golden Seals	NHL	14	2	2	4	4	—	—	—	—	—
1971–72	Baltimore Clippers	AHL	23	3	6	9	10	—	—	—	—	—
1971–72	Boston Braves	AHL	16	0	3	3	0	9	0	1	1	7
1972–73	Philadelphia Blazers	WHA	74	16	23	39	43	4	0	1	1	0
1973–74	Vancouver Blazers	WHA	49	8	6	14	20	—	—	—	—	—
1973–74	Broome Dusters	NAHL	17	2	5	7	13	—	—	—	—	—
1974–75	Vancouver Blazers	WHA	4	0	0	0	0	—	—	—	—	—
1974–75	Tulsa Oilers	CHL	46	8	22	30	60	2	1	0	1	2
1975–76	Cincinnati Stingers	WHA	20	1	8	9	0	—	—	—	—	—
1975–76	Hampton Gulls	SHL	45	15	26	41	59	9	2	6	8	4
1976–77	Hampton Gulls	SHL	50	16	26	42	46	—	—	—	—	—
1977–78	Hampton Gulls	AHL	43	4	8	12	84	—	—	—	—	—
WHA totals			147	25	37	62	63	4	0	1	1	0
NHL totals			125	18	17	35	35	3	0	0	0	0
