= Frank Beaton =

Canadian ice hockey player (b. 1953)

- Born: April 28, 1953 (age 73) Antigonish, Nova Scotia, Canada
- Height: 5 ft 10 in (178 cm)
- Weight: 175 lb (79 kg; 12 st 7 lb)
- Position: Left wing
- Shot: Left
- Played for: Cincinnati Stingers; Edmonton Oilers; Birmingham Bulls; New York Rangers
- NHL draft: Undrafted
- WHA draft: Undrafted
- Playing career: 1973–1983

Alexander Francis "Seldom" Beaton (born April 28, 1953) is a Canadian retired professional ice hockey player who played 153 games in the World Hockey Association with the Cincinnati Stingers, Edmonton Oilers, and Birmingham Bulls from 1975 to 1978 and 25 games in the National Hockey League with the New York Rangers from 1979 to 1980.

Notoriously, Beaton was traded in 1982 by the New York Islanders to the Minnesota North Stars, in exchange for a steak dinner.

== Career statistics ==
=== Regular season and playoffs ===
			Regular season					Playoffs
Season	Team	League	GP	G	A	Pts	PIM	GP	G	A	Pts	PIM
1969–70	Dartmouth Lakers	MJrHL	—	—	—	—	—	4	1	0	1	2
1970–71	Dartmouth Lakers	MJrHL	—	—	—	—	—	—	—	—	—	—
1970–71	Cape Breton Metros	MJrHL	1	0	1	1	0	—	—	—	—	—
1970–71	Antigonish Bulldogs	MJrHL	—	—	—	—	—	7	4	5	9	22
1971–72	Sarnia Bees	SOJHL	49	5	10	15	226	—	—	—	—	—
1972–73	Windsor Spitfires	SOJHL	16	3	10	13	91	—	—	—	—	—
1973–74	Flint Generals	IHL	66	9	14	23	190	7	2	2	4	18
1974–75	Flint Generals	IHL	65	4	17	21	175	5	0	0	0	13
1975–76	Cincinnati Stingers	WHA	29	2	3	5	61	—	—	—	—	—
1975–76	Hampton Gulls	SHL	45	17	14	31	276	—	—	—	—	—
1976–77	Edmonton Oilers	WHA	68	4	9	13	274	5	0	2	2	21
1976–77	Hampton Gulls	SHL	7	2	3	5	14	—	—	—	—	—
1977–78	Birmingham Bulls	WHA	56	6	9	15	279	5	2	0	2	10
1977–78	Hampton Gulls	AHL	6	0	2	2	33	—	—	—	—	—
1978–79	New York Rangers	NHL	2	0	0	0	0	—	—	—	—	—
1978–79	New Haven Nighthawks	AHL	74	6	23	29	319	10	2	0	2	40
1979–80	New York Rangers	NHL	23	1	1	2	43	—	—	—	—	—
1979–80	New Haven Nighthawks	AHL	40	10	14	24	106	10	1	4	5	52
1980–81	New Haven Nighthawks	AHL	15	1	1	2	20	—	—	—	—	—
1980–81	Birmingham Bulls	CHL	41	8	5	13	143	—	—	—	—	—
1981–82	Indianapolis Checkers	CHL	77	13	28	41	270	13	3	6	9	36
1982–83	Birmingham South Stars	CHL	69	15	19	34	188	10	4	2	6	18
WHA totals			153	12	21	33	614	—	—	—	—	—
NHL totals			25	1	1	2	43	—	—	—	—	—
