= Dale Smedsmo =

American ice hockey player (born 1951)

- Born: April 23, 1951 (age 74); Roseau, Minnesota, U.S.
- Height: 6 ft 1 in (185 cm)
- Weight: 195 lb (88 kg; 13 st 13 lb)
- Position: Left wing
- Shot: Left
- Played for: Toronto Maple Leafs; Cincinnati Stingers; New England Whalers; Indianapolis Racers
- NHL draft: 93rd overall, 1971; Toronto Maple Leafs
- Playing career: 1971–1979

Dale Darwin Smedsmo (born August 23, 1951) is an American former professional ice hockey forward.

== Career ==
Smedsmo played four games in the National Hockey League for the Toronto Maple Leafs and 110 games in the World Hockey Association with the New England Whalers, Cincinnati Stingers, and Indianapolis Racers between 1973 and 1978. Smedsmo played college hockey at Bemidji State University for the Bemidji State Beavers.

== Personal life ==
Smedsmo's stepson is Dustin Byfuglien, who also played in the NHL.

== Career statistics ==
=== Regular season and playoffs ===
			Regular season					Playoffs
Season	Team	League	GP	G	A	Pts	PIM	GP	G	A	Pts	PIM
1968–69	Roseau High School	HS-MN	—	—	—	—	—	—	—	—	—	—
1969–70	Bemidji State University	NCAA III	—	—	—	—	—	—	—	—	—	—
1970–71	Bemidji State University	NCAA III	24	16	5	21	52	—	—	—	—	—
1971–72	Bemidji State University	NCAA III	—	—	—	—	—	—	—	—	—	—
1971–72	Tulsa Oilers	CHL	6	0	2	2	0	—	—	—	—	—
1972–73	Toronto Maple Leafs	NHL	4	0	0	0	0	—	—	—	—	—
1972–73	Tulsa Oilers	CHL	64	12	18	30	185	—	—	—	—	—
1973–74	Tulsa Oilers	CHL	63	11	15	26	214	—	—	—	—	—
1974–75	Saginaw Gears	IHL	12	4	1	5	39	—	—	—	—	—
1974–75	Hampton Gulls	SHL	33	12	5	17	134	—	—	—	—	—
1974–75	Oklahoma City Blazers	CHL	20	3	3	6	51	5	0	0	0	14
1975–76	Cincinnati Stingers	WHA	66	8	14	22	187	—	—	—	—	—
1976–77	Hampton Gulls	SHL	14	1	7	8	47	—	—	—	—	—
1976–77	New England Whalers	WHA	15	2	0	2	54	—	—	—	—	—
1976–77	Rhode Island Reds	AHL	2	0	0	0	5	—	—	—	—	—
1976–77	Broome Dusters	NAHL	2	1	1	2	2	—	—	—	—	—
1976–77	Cincinnati Stingers	WHA	23	0	5	5	43	2	0	1	1	0
1977–78	Indianapolis Racers	WHA	6	0	3	3	7	—	—	—	—	—
1977–78	Long Beach Sharks	PHL	40	16	32	48	162	—	—	—	—	—
1978–79	Tucson Rustlers	PHL	55	15	24	39	144	—	—	—	—	—
1978–79	Los Angeles Blades	PHL	2	0	0	0	16	—	—	—	—	—
WHA totals			110	10	22	32	291	2	0	1	1	0
NHL totals			4	0	0	0	0	—	—	—	—	—

== See also ==
- List of family relations in the NHL
