= Ron Serafini =

American ice hockey player (1953–2021)

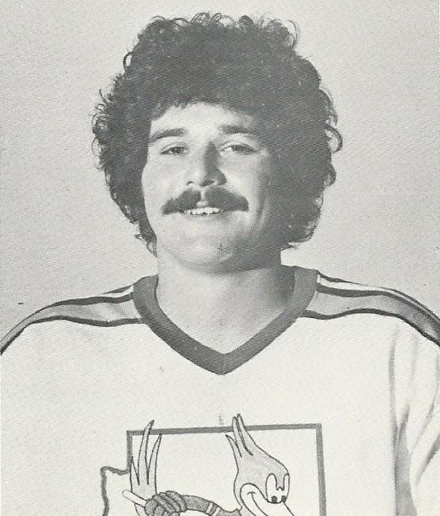
- Born: October 31, 1953 Highland Park, Michigan, U.S.
- Died: October 30, 2021 (aged 67) Clarkston, Michigan, U.S.
- Height: 5 ft 11 in (180 cm)
- Weight: 200 lb (91 kg; 14 st 4 lb)
- Position: Defense
- Shot: Right
- Played for: California Golden Seals
- NHL draft: 50th overall, 1973; California Golden Seals
- WHA draft: 88th overall, 1973; Cleveland Crusaders
- Playing career: 1973–1977

Ronald William Serafini (October 31, 1953 – October 30, 2021) was an American professional ice hockey defenseman who played only two games in the National Hockey League for the California Golden Seals and 16 games for the Cincinnati Stingers of the World Hockey Association.

Serafini was born in Highland Park, Michigan, but grew up in Detroit, Michigan. As a youth, he played in the 1965 and 1966 Quebec International Pee-Wee Hockey Tournaments with the Detroit Roostertail minor ice hockey team.

After hockey career he worked as a Realtor in Clarkston, Michigan.

== Regular season and playoffs ==
			Regular season					Playoffs
Season	Team	League	GP	G	A	Pts	PIM	GP	G	A	Pts	PIM
1970–71	Detroit Jr. Red Wings	SOJHL	—	—	—	—	160	—	—	—	—	—
1971–72	St. Catharines Black Hawks	OHA	61	6	17	23	164	—	—	—	—	—
1972–73	St. Catharines Black Hawks	OHA	63	17	25	42	221	—	—	—	—	—
1973–74	California Golden Seals	NHL	2	0	0	0	2	—	—	—	—	—
1973–74	Salt Lake Golden Eagles	WHL	74	8	31	39	202	5	0	0	0	2
1974–75	Denver Spurs	CHL	75	7	21	28	83	2	0	1	1	9
1975–76	Cincinnati Stingers	WHA	16	0	2	2	15	—	—	—	—	—
1975–76	Tucson Mavericks	CHL	20	1	3	4	39	—	—	—	—	—
1975–76	Hampton Gulls	SHL	27	4	20	24	20	9	1	7	8	10
1976–77	Salt Lake Golden Eagles	CHL	31	3	5	8	29	—	—	—	—	—
1976–77	Oklahoma City Blazers	CHL	10	1	0	1	17	—	—	—	—	—
1976–77	Winston-Salem Polar Twins	SHL	8	1	2	3	4	—	—	—	—	—
1976–77	Hampton Gulls	SHL	9	0	6	6	10	—	—	—	—	—
1977–78	VEU Feldkirch	AUT	22	10	12	22	51	—	—	—	—	—
1978–79	VEU Feldkirch	AUT	—	—	—	—	—	—	—	—	—	—
WHA totals			16	0	2	2	15	—	—	—	—	—
NHL totals			2	0	0	0	2	—	—	—	—	—
