= Bill Oleschuk =

Canadian ice hockey player

- Born: July 20, 1955 (age 69); Edmonton, Alberta, Canada
- Height: 6 ft 3 in (191 cm)
- Weight: 200 lb (91 kg; 14 st 4 lb)
- Position: Goaltender
- Caught: Left
- Played for: Kansas City Scouts; Colorado Rockies
- NHL draft: 110th overall, 1975; Kansas City Scouts
- WHA draft: 150th overall, 1975; Houston Aeros
- Playing career: 1975–1984

William Stephen Oleschuk (born July 20, 1955) is a Canadian former professional ice hockey goaltender who played for the Kansas City Scouts and Colorado Rockies in the National Hockey League between 1975 and 1979. He played 55 games in the NHL, finishing with a 7–28–10 record and one shutout. The rest of his career, which lasted from 1975 to 1984, was spent in various minor leagues.

== Career statistics ==
=== Regular season and playoffs ===
			Regular season									Playoffs
Season	Team	League	GP	W	L	T	MIN	GA	SO	GAA	SV%	GP	W	L	MIN	GA	SO	GAA	SV%
1971–72	Edmonton Maple Leafs	AJHL	22	—	—	—	1320	99	0	4.58	—	—	—	—	—	—	—	—	—
1972–73	Winnipeg Jets	WCHL	1	—	—	—	20	2	0	6.00	—	—	—	—	—	—	—	—	—
1973–74	Prince Albert Raiders	SJHL	10	—	—	—	2280	38	0	3.85	—	—	—	—	—	—	—	—	—
1973–74	Swift Current Broncos	WCHL	11	—	—	—	518	36	0	4.17	—	—	—	—	—	—	—	—	—
1974–75	Lethbridge Broncos	WCHL	2	—	—	—	80	8	0	6.00	—	—	—	—	—	—	—	—	—
1974–75	Saskatoon Blades	WCHL	41	24	12	5	2419	121	4	3.00	—	12	7	5	672	37	0	3.30	—
1975–76	Kansas City Scouts	NHL	1	0	1	0	60	4	0	4.00	.923	—	—	—	—	—	—	—	—
1975–76	Port Huron Flags	IHL	44	—	—	—	2417	145	0	3.60	—	9	—	—	443	24	0	3.25	—
1976–77	Baltimore Clippers	SHL	30	—	—	—	1780	97	1	3.27	.914	—	—	—	—	—	—	—	—
1976–77	Oklahoma City Blazers	CHL	3	0	3	0	159	15	0	5.66	.915	—	—	—	—	—	—	—	—
1977–78	Colorado Rockies	NHL	2	0	2	0	100	9	0	5.40	.839	—	—	—	—	—	—	—	—
1977–78	Phoenix Roadrunners	CHL	9	2	6	1	549	45	0	4.92	—	—	—	—	—	—	—	—	—
1977–78	Hampton Gulls	AHL	11	1	9	1	616	40	0	3.90	—	—	—	—	—	—	—	—	—
1977–78	Philadelphia Firebirds	AHL	2	0	1	0	65	9	0	8.30	—	—	—	—	—	—	—	—	—
1977–78	Flint Generals	IHL	13	—	—	—	702	57	0	4.87	—	4	—	—	204	10	0	2.94	—
1978–79	Colorado Rockies	NHL	40	6	19	8	2115	136	1	3.86	.875	—	—	—	—	—	—	—	—
1979–80	Colorado Rockies	NHL	12	1	6	2	556	39	0	4.21	.859	—	—	—	—	—	—	—	—
1979–80	Fort Worth Texans	CHL	43	24	14	5	2478	134	1	3.24	—	2	1	1	72	8	0	6.67	—
1980–81	Fort Worth Texans	CHL	36	10	22	1	2054	122	0	3.56	—	5	—	—	300	14	0	2.80	—
1981–82	Dallas Black Hawks	CHL	7	2	4	0	322	26	0	4.84	—	—	—	—	—	—	—	—	—
1982–83	Peoria Prancers	IHL	29	—	—	—	1448	147	1	6.09	—	—	—	—	—	—	—	—	—
1983–84	Fort Wayne Komets	IHL	1	—	—	—	60	7	0	7.00	—	—	—	—	—	—	—	—	—
NHL totals			55	7	28	10	2832	188	1	3.98	.872	—	—	—	—	—	—	—	—
