= Bob Johnson (ice hockey, born 1948) =

American ice hockey player

- Born: November 12, 1948 (age 77) Farmington, Michigan, U.S.
- Height: 6 ft 0 in (183 cm)
- Weight: 180 lb (82 kg; 12 st 12 lb)
- Position: Goaltender
- Caught: Left
- Played for: St. Louis Blues; Pittsburgh Penguins; Cleveland Crusaders; Denver Spurs; Ottawa Civics
- NHL draft: Undrafted
- Playing career: 1970–1977

Robert Martin Johnson (born November 12, 1948) is an American former professional ice hockey goaltender. He played 23 games in the National Hockey League with the St. Louis Blues and Pittsburgh Penguins from 1972 to 1975, and 42 games in the World Hockey Association with the Cleveland Crusaders, Denver Spurs and Ottawa Civics from 1975 to 1976.

== Career ==
During his career, Johnson played with the Pittsburgh Penguins and St. Louis Blues. He also played 42 games in the World Hockey Association, with the Denver Spurs/Ottawa Civics and the Cleveland Crusaders.

== Personal life ==
He is the father of Brent Johnson who has also played goal with the Pittsburgh Penguins. His father in-law is Sid Abel.

== Career statistics ==
=== Regular season and playoffs ===
			Regular season									Playoffs
Season	Team	League	GP	W	L	T	MIN	GA	SO	GAA	SV%	GP	W	L	MIN	GA	SO	GAA	SV%
1967–68	Michigan State University	B1G	17	—	—	—	1020	69	0	4.06	.891	—	—	—	—	—	—	—	—
1968–69	Michigan State University	B1G	13	—	—	—	760	49	0	3.87	.882	—	—	—	—	—	—	—	—
1969–70	Michigan State University	B1G	5	—	—	—	280	23	0	4.93	.840	—	—	—	—	—	—	—	—
1970–71	Toledo Hornets	IHL	44	—	—	—	2478	176	0	4.26	—	—	—	—	—	—	—	—	—
1970–71	Fort Worth Wings	CHL	1	—	—	—	60	3	0	3.00	—	—	—	—	—	—	—	—	—
1971–72	Denver Spurs	WHL	37	19	10	6	2030	96	1	2.83	—	5	4	1	299	5	2	1.00	—
1972–73	St. Louis Blues	NHL	11	6	5	0	584	26	0	2.67	.905	—	—	—	—	—	—	—	—
1972–73	Denver Spurs	WHL	30	11	10	6	1589	91	2	3.44	—	4	1	3	245	16	0	3.92	—
1973–74	Hershey Bears	AHL	43	18	15	9	2426	131	0	3.23	—	10	8	2	608	31	1	3.05	—
1974–75	Pittsburgh Penguins	NHL	12	3	4	1	478	40	0	5.03	.858	—	—	—	—	—	—	—	—
1974–75	Hershey Bears	AHL	31	11	13	5	1750	106	1	3.63	—	—	—	—	—	—	—	—	—
1975–76	Denver Spurs/Ottawa Civics	WHA	24	8	14	1	1334	88	0	3.96	.872	—	—	—	—	—	—	—	—
1975–76	Cleveland Crusaders	WHA	18	9	8	0	1043	56	1	3.22	.907	2	0	2	120	8	0	4.00	—
1976–77	Rhode Island Reds	AHL	10	2	8	0	568	43	0	4.54	—	—	—	—	—	—	—	—	—
1976–77	Hampton Gulls	SHL	3	—	—	—	180	8	0	2.67	.913	—	—	—	—	—	—	—	—
1976–77	Broome Dusters	NAHL	5	—	—	—	275	22	0	4.78	.849	—	—	—	—	—	—	—	—
WHA totals			42	17	22	1	2388	144	1	3.62	.888	2	0	2	120	8	0	4.00	—
NHL totals			23	9	9	1	1061	66	0	3.73	.881	—	—	—	—	—	—	—	—
