= Macon Whoopee =

The Macon Whoopee or Macon Whoopees may refer to:

- Macon Whoopee (CHL), an ice hockey team in the Central Hockey League from 1996 to 2001
- Macon Whoopee (ECHL), an ice hockey team in the East Coast Hockey League during the 2001–02 season
- Macon Whoopees (SHL), an ice hockey team in the Southern Hockey League during the 1973–74 season
