= Jamie Hislop =

Canadian ice hockey player and scout

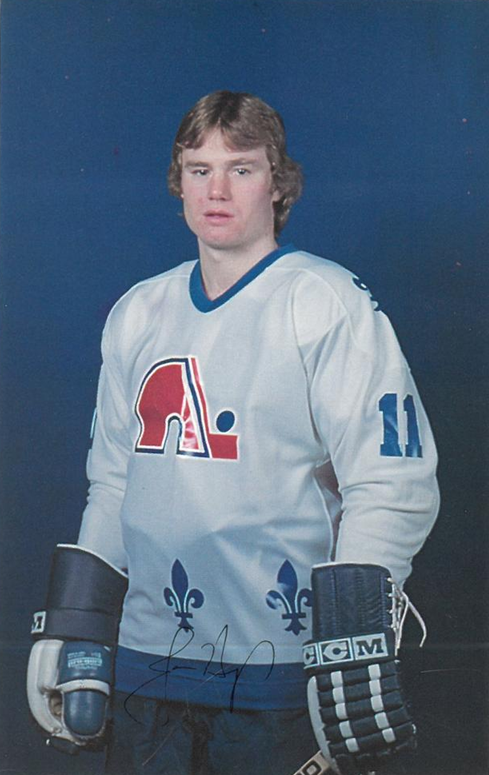
- Hislop in 1980 postcard
- Born: January 20, 1954 (age 72) Sarnia, Ontario, Canada
- Height: 5 ft 10 in (178 cm)
- Weight: 180 lb (82 kg; 12 st 12 lb)
- Position: Forward
- Shot: Right
- Played for: Cincinnati Stingers; Quebec Nordiques; Calgary Flames
- NHL draft: 140th overall, 1974; Montreal Canadiens
- WHA draft: 49th overall, 1974; Cleveland Crusaders
- Playing career: 1976–1983

James Donald Hislop (born January 20, 1954) is a Canadian former professional ice hockey forward who played for the Cincinnati Stingers in the World Hockey Association from 1976 to 1979 and then the Quebec Nordiques and Calgary Flames of the National Hockey League (NHL) between 1979 and 1984. He helped the Flames reach the NHL playoff semifinals for the first time in club history in 1981. After his playing career he worked as an assistant coach with the Flames and then as a scout with the Minnesota Wild.

== Playing career ==
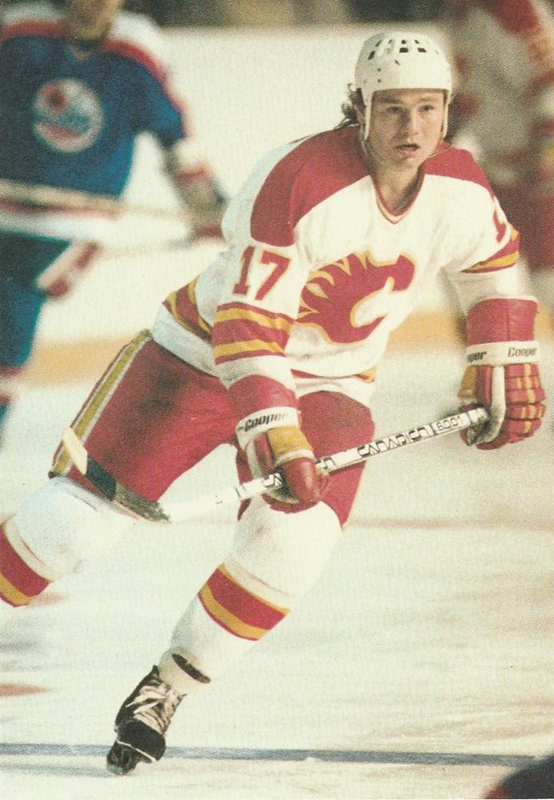
1982 postcard of Hislop in action for Calgary Flames

Born in Sarnia, Ontario, Hislop played junior hockey in Tier II Ontario Hockey Association play.

Hislop attended the University of New Hampshire under legendary coach Charlie Holt. In Hislop's sophomore year with the Wildcats in 1974, he led the ECAC in assists with 35 en route to the conference title, leading to him being drafted by the Montreal Canadiens in the 8th round of the 1974 NHL amateur draft. He followed that performance up with two 66-point seasons, winning conference First All-Star honours in 1975 and 1976 and being named to the NCAA First Team All-American squad in 1976. He finished his collegiate career with 77 goals and 132 assists for 209 points, the leading scorer in Wildcat history to that time, and is currently 4th all-time.

After spending half a season in the minor leagues with the Hampton Gulls, Hislop was signed by the Cincinnati Stingers of the World Hockey Association in 1977. He played three seasons with the Stingers, his best year coming in 1979, when he scored 30 goals and 40 assists for 70 points, chipping in six points in three playoff games.

When the Stingers folded in the WHA-NHL merger, in 1979, Hislop's rights were acquired by the Winnipeg Jets, who traded him a few days later to the Quebec Nordiques for defenseman Barry Melrose. He was the only player to play in all 80 games for the Nordiques during their inaugural season in the NHL, scoring 19 goals. In 1980, he had the good fortune of being inserted as the right winger on a line with brothers Peter Stastny and Anton Stastny, and after a short period of adaptation, the three clicked beautifully together as Hislop scored 41 points in 50 games. With Réal Cloutier, another right-winger, back from an injury and the Nordiques weak in goal, he was traded midway through the season to the Calgary Flames in exchange for Dan Bouchard; it proved to be his best year in the NHL with a combined 25 goals and 31 assists for 56 points. He played the remainder of his career with the Flames, settling into being a solid two-way player who almost never missed a game and serving two full seasons before an eye injury sustained in a game against the New York Islanders on December 1, 1983 forced his retirement.

Hislop finished his NHL career with 75 goals and 103 assists for 178 points in 345 games, adding 61 goals and 102 assists for 163 points in the WHA.

== Post-playing career ==
He joined the Flames front office immediately upon his retirement, as an assistant coach, but left hockey for four years until becoming the head coach for the Salt Lake Golden Eagles of the International Hockey League for two seasons starting in 1989. After that, Hislop returned to the Flames, working as a scout and spending three more seasons as an assistant coach until his final retirement in 2004.

== Career statistics ==
=== Regular season and playoffs ===
			Regular season					Playoffs
Season	Team	League	GP	G	A	Pts	PIM	GP	G	A	Pts	PIM
1971–72	Stratford Cullitons	OHA-B	38	26	30	56	—	—	—	—	—	—
1972–73	University of New Hampshire	ECAC	26	5	16	21	12	—	—	—	—	—
1973–74	University of New Hampshire	ECAC	31	21	35	56	30	—	—	—	—	—
1974–75	University of New Hampshire	ECAC	31	28	38	66	12	—	—	—	—	—
1975–76	University of New Hampshire	ECAC	31	23	43	66	20	—	—	—	—	—
1976–77	Cincinnati Stingers	WHA	46	7	19	26	6	4	0	1	1	4
1976–77	Hampton Gulls	SHL	37	16	17	33	11	—	—	—	—	—
1977–78	Cincinnati Stingers	WHA	80	24	43	67	17	—	—	—	—	—
1978–79	Cincinnati Stingers	WHA	80	30	40	70	45	3	2	4	6	0
1979–80	Quebec Nordiques	NHL	80	19	20	39	6	—	—	—	—	—
1980–81	Quebec Nordiques	NHL	50	19	22	41	15	—	—	—	—	—
1980–81	Calgary Flames	NHL	29	6	9	15	11	16	3	0	3	5
1981–82	Calgary Flames	NHL	80	16	25	41	35	3	0	0	0	0
1982–83	Calgary Flames	NHL	79	14	19	33	17	9	0	2	2	6
1983–84	Calgary Flames	NHL	27	1	8	9	2	—	—	—	—	—
WHA totals			206	61	102	163	68	7	2	5	7	4
NHL totals			345	75	103	178	86	28	3	2	5	11

== Awards and honors ==
Award	Year
All-ECAC Hockey First Team	1974–75
All-ECAC Hockey First Team	1975–76
AHCA East All-American	1975–76
