= Willie Brossart =

Canadian ice hockey player

- Born: May 29, 1949 (age 75); Allan, Saskatchewan, Canada
- Height: 6 ft 0 in (183 cm)
- Weight: 190 lb (86 kg; 13 st 8 lb)
- Position: Defence
- Shot: Left
- Played for: Philadelphia Flyers; Toronto Maple Leafs; Washington Capitals
- NHL draft: 28th overall, 1969; Philadelphia Flyers
- Playing career: 1969–1977

William James Brossart (born May 29, 1949) is a Canadian former professional ice hockey defenceman who played in the National Hockey League (NHL) with the Philadelphia Flyers, Toronto Maple Leafs and Washington Capitals between 1971 and 1976.

== Playing career ==
Brossart was drafted by the Philadelphia Flyers in the 3rd round, 28th overall, of the 1969 NHL Amateur Draft.

== Career statistics ==
=== Regular season and playoffs ===
			Regular season					Playoffs
Season	Team	League	GP	G	A	Pts	PIM	GP	G	A	Pts	PIM
1967–68	Swift Current Broncos	WCHL	59	12	34	46	199	—	—	—	—	—
1968–69	Swift Current Broncos	WCHL	68	8	27	35	94	10	1	3	4	14
1968–69	Estevan Bruins	WCHL	—	—	—	—	—	—	—	—	—	—
1969–70	Quebec Aces	AHL	57	5	9	14	67	6	0	0	0	0
1970–71	Philadelphia Flyers	NHL	1	0	0	0	0	—	—	—	—	—
1970–71	Quebec Aces	AHL	62	8	17	25	182	1	0	2	2	0
1971–72	Philadelphia Flyers	NHL	42	0	4	4	12	—	—	—	—	—
1971–72	Richmond Robins	AHL	29	3	14	17	76	—	—	—	—	—
1972–73	Philadelphia Flyers	NHL	4	0	1	1	0	—	—	—	—	—
1972–73	Richmond Robins	AHL	54	1	29	30	66	3	0	0	0	0
1973–74	Toronto Maple Leafs	NHL	17	0	1	1	20	1	0	0	0	0
1974–75	Toronto Maple Leafs	NHL	4	0	0	0	2	—	—	—	—	—
1974–75	Washington Capitals	NHL	12	1	0	1	14	—	—	—	—	—
1975–76	Washington Capitals	NHL	49	0	8	8	40	—	—	—	—	—
1975–76	Richmond Robins	AHL	30	2	7	9	22	8	0	3	3	2
1976–77	Richmond Wildcats	SHL	36	4	20	24	24	—	—	—	—	—
1976–77	Baltimore Clippers	SHL	8	0	4	4	0	—	—	—	—	—
NHL totals			129	1	14	15	88	1	0	0	0	0
