= François Ouimet (ice hockey) =

- Born: October 14, 1951 (age 73); Montreal, Quebec, Canada
- Height: 5 ft 10 in (178 cm)
- Weight: 175 lb (79 kg; 12 st 7 lb)
- Position: Defence
- Shot: Left
- Played for: WHA; Minnesota Fighting Saints; Cincinnati Stingers; AHL; Rochester Americans; Hampton Gulls
- National team: France
- NHL draft: Undrafted
- Playing career: 1973–1991

François Ouimet (born October 14, 1951) is a Canadian-born former professional ice hockey defenceman.

== Career ==
Ouimet played 25 games in the World Hockey Association with the Minnesota Fighting Saints and Cincinnati Stingers during the 1975–76 and 1976–77 seasons.

== Career statistics ==
			Regular season					Playoffs
Season	Team	League	GP	G	A	Pts	PIM	GP	G	A	Pts	PIM
1969–70	Rosemont National	QMJHL	53	7	19	26	83	4	0	1	1	6
1970–71	Saint-Jerome Alouettes	QMJHL	48	4	15	19	99	5	0	0	0	6
1973–74	Johnstown Jets	NAHL	5	1	0	1	2	—	—	—	—	—
1973–74	Denver Spurs	WHL-Sr.	23	3	10	13	43	—	—	—	—	—
1973–74	Rochester Americans	AHL	40	4	11	15	56	—	—	—	—	—
1974–75	Columbus Owls	IHL	4	0	0	0	8	—	—	—	—	—
1974–75	Johnstown Jets	NAHL-Sr.	55	12	21	33	60	15	1	4	5	8
1975–76	Minnesota Fighting Saints	WHA	9	0	2	2	2	—	—	—	—	—
1975–76	Johnstown Jets	NAHL-Sr.	58	7	50	57	73	4	1	3	4	7
1976–77	Hampton Gulls	SHL-Sr.	28	1	16	17	63	—	—	—	—	—
1976–77	Cincinnati Stingers	WHA	16	1	8	9	10	—	—	—	—	—
1976–77	Johnstown Jets	NAHL-Sr.	16	5	7	12	12	3	0	0	0	0
1977–78	Hampton Gulls	AHL	46	0	14	14	50	—	—	—	—	—
1980–81	Ours de Villard-de-Lans	France	—	12	13	25	—	—	—	—	—	—
1986–87	Yétis du Mont-Blanc	France	—	—	—	—	—	—	—	—	—	—
1988–89	Drakkars de Caen	France2	27	7	13	20	62	—	—	—	—	—
1989–90	Drakkars de Caen	France	22	0	4	4	12	—	—	—	—	—
1990–91	Ours de Villard-de-Lans	France2	28	3	13	16	31	—	—	—	—	—
WHA totals			25	1	10	11	12	—	—	—	—	—
AHL totals			86	4	25	29	106	—	—	—	—	—
