= Kevin Kemp =

Canadian ice hockey player

- Born: May 3, 1954 (age 71); Ottawa, Ontario, Canada
- Height: 6 ft 0 in (183 cm)
- Weight: 188 lb (85 kg; 13 st 6 lb)
- Position: Defence
- Shot: Left
- Played for: Hartford Whalers
- NHL draft: 138th overall, 1974; Toronto Maple Leafs
- Playing career: 1974–1981

Kevin Glen Kemp (born May 3, 1954) is a Canadian former ice hockey defenceman who played three games in the National Hockey League for the Hartford Whalers during the 1980–81 season.

== Playing career ==
Born in Ottawa, Ontario, Kemp was drafted 138th overall by the Toronto Maple Leafs in the 1974 NHL amateur draft but never played for them, instead he had spells in the United States Hockey League for the Milwaukee Admirals, the Southern Hockey League for the Hampton Gulls, the International Hockey League for the Saginaw Gears and the Central Hockey League for the Oklahoma City Blazers. He followed that with two full seasons with the Gears in the IHL before moving on the New Brunswick Hawks of the American Hockey League. He was then claimed in the 1979 NHL Expansion Draft by the Hartford Whalers and went on to have full seasons in the AHL with the Springfield Indians and the Binghamton Whalers but did manage to play three regular season games in the National Hockey League for the Hartford Whalers, going scoreless. Kemp retired at the end of the season.

Despite never playing for the Ottawa Senators, Kemp is a member of the Senators' Alumni, appearing at events with the alumni including Hockey Day in Whitehorse in 2011.

== Career statistics ==
=== Regular season and playoffs ===
			Regular season					Playoffs
Season	Team	League	GP	G	A	Pts	PIM	GP	G	A	Pts	PIM
1971–72	Ottawa M&W Rangers	CJHL	28	2	8	10	—	—	—	—	—	—
1972–73	Ottawa M&W Rangers	CJHL	—	—	—	—	—	—	—	—	—	—
1973–74	Ottawa 67s	OHA	59	4	8	12	205	7	0	2	2	24
1974–75	Saginaw Gears	IHL	3	0	0	0	0	—	—	—	—	—
1974–75	Hampton Gulls	SHL	5	0	0	0	17	—	—	—	—	—
1974–75	Milwaukee Admirals	USHL	33	4	14	18	59	—	—	—	—	—
1975–76	Oklahoma City Blazers	CHL	33	0	1	1	31	3	1	0	1	2
1976–77	Saginaw Gears	IHL	50	2	11	13	186	19	1	3	4	99
1977–78	Saginaw Gears	IHL	78	10	18	28	267	5	0	0	0	26
1978–79	Saginaw Gears	IHL	13	0	4	4	28	4	1	1	2	6
1978–79	New Brunswick Hawks	AHL	44	1	4	5	113	—	—	—	—	—
1979–80	Springfield Indians	AHL	77	0	19	19	180	—	—	—	—	—
1980–81	Hartford Whalers	NHL	3	0	0	0	4	—	—	—	—	—
1980–81	Binghamton Whalers	AHL	75	0	5	5	204	5	0	2	2	4
AHL totals			196	1	28	29	497	5	0	2	2	4
IHL totals			144	12	33	45	481	28	2	4	6	131
NHL totals			3	0	0	0	4	—	—	—	—	—
