= Paul Hoganson =

Canadian ice hockey goaltender

- Born: November 12, 1949 (age 75); Toronto, Ontario, Canada
- Height: 5 ft 11 in (180 cm)
- Weight: 175 lb (79 kg; 12 st 7 lb)
- Position: Goaltender
- Caught: Right
- Played for: Pittsburgh Penguins; Los Angeles Sharks; Michigan Stags/Baltimore Blades; New England Whalers; Cincinnati Stingers; Indianapolis Racers.
- NHL draft: 62nd overall, 1969; Pittsburgh Penguins
- Playing career: 1969–1979

Paul Edward Hoganson (born November 12, 1949) is a Canadian former professional ice hockey goaltender. He played two games in the National Hockey League with the Pittsburgh Penguins during the 1970–71 season and 143 games in the World Hockey Association with the Los Angeles Sharks, Michigan Stags/Baltimore Blades, New England Whalers, Cincinnati Stingers, and Indianapolis Racers from 1973 to 1978.

As a youth, Hoganson played in the 1962 Quebec International Pee-Wee Hockey Tournament with the Humor Valley team. Born in Toronto, Ontario, Hoganson is a cousin with Dale Hoganson.

== Career statistics ==
=== Regular season and playoffs ===
			Regular season									Playoffs
Season	Team	League	GP	W	L	T	MIN	GA	SO	GAA	SV%	GP	W	L	MIN	GA	SO	GAA	SV%
1966–67	Hamilton Red Wings	OHA	5	—	—	—	290	19	0	3.93	—	—	—	—	—	—	—	—	—
1967–68	Hamilton Red Wings	OHA	1	—	—	—	60	5	0	5.00	—	—	—	—	—	—	—	—	—
1968–69	Hamilton Red Wings	OHA	1	—	—	—	60	3	0	3.00	—	—	—	—	—	—	—	—	—
1968–69	Kitchener Rangers	OHA	22	—	—	—	1320	125	0	5.68	—	—	—	—	—	—	—	—	—
1968–69	Toronto Marlboros	OHA	22	—	—	—	1310	84	0	3.84	—	6	—	—	360	28	0	4.67	—
1969–70	Fort Wayne Komets	IHL	37	—	—	—	2101	121	3	3.46	—	3	0	3	180	14	0	4.67	—
1969–70	Baltimore Clippers	AHL	3	—	—	—	100	5	0	3.00	—	—	—	—	—	—	—	—	—
1970–71	Pittsburgh Penguins	NHL	2	0	1	0	58	7	0	7.35	.750	—	—	—	—	—	—	—	—
1970–71	Amarillo Wranglers	CHL	48	—	—	—	2828	203	0	4.37	—	—	—	—	—	—	—	—	—
1971–72	Fort Wayne Komets	IHL	52	—	—	—	3074	161	2	3.14	—	8	4	4	480	25	0	3.12	—
1972–73	Hershey Bears	AHL	41	—	—	—	2251	110	3	2.98	—	3	—	—	179	14	0	4.69	—
1973–74	Los Angeles Sharks	WHA	27	6	16	0	1308	102	0	4.68	.857	—	—	—	—	—	—	—	—
1973–74	Greensboro Generals	SHL	3	—	—	—	180	12	0	4.00	.900	—	—	—	—	—	—	—	—
1974–75	Michigan Stags/Baltimore Blades	WHA	32	9	19	2	1776	121	2	4.09	.880	—	—	—	—	—	—	—	—
1974–75	Tulsa Oilers	CHL	6	3	3	0	320	19	0	3.56	—	—	—	—	—	—	—	—	—
1975–76	New England Whalers	WHA	4	1	2	0	224	16	0	4.29	.852	—	—	—	—	—	—	—	—
1975–76	Cincinnati Stingers	WHA	45	19	24	0	2392	145	2	3.64	.886	—	—	—	—	—	—	—	—
1976–77	Cincinnati Stingers	WHA	17	5	6	1	823	64	1	4.67	.940	—	—	—	—	—	—	—	—
1976–77	Indianapolis Racers	WHA	11	3	2	0	395	24	0	3.65	.879	5	3	2	348	17	1	2.93	—
1976–77	Broome Dusters	NAHL	8	—	—	—	480	44	0	5.00	.879	—	—	—	—	—	—	—	—
1977–78	Cincinnati Stingers	WHA	7	1	2	1	326	24	0	4.42	.843	—	—	—	—	—	—	—	—
1977–78	Hampton Gulls	AHL	3	1	1	1	155	11	0	4.26	.866	—	—	—	—	—	—	—	—
1977–78	San Francisco Shamrocks	PHL	11	—	—	—	660	43	0	3.90	—	—	—	—	—	—	—	—	—
1978–79	Tucson Rustlers	PHL	37	—	—	—	2058	170	1	4.96	—	—	—	—	—	—	—	—	—
WHA totals			143	44	71	4	7244	496	5	4.11	.871	5	3	2	348	17	1	2.93	—
NHL totals			2	0	1	0	58	7	0	7.35	.759	—	—	—	—	—	—	—	—
