= Keke Mortson =

Canadian ice hockey player (1934–1995)

- Born: March 29, 1934 Arntfield, Quebec, Canada
- Died: December 8, 1995 (aged 61) North Bay, Ontario, Canada
- Height: 6 ft 0 in (183 cm)
- Weight: 175 lb (79 kg; 12 st 7 lb)
- Position: Centre / Right wing
- Shot: Right
- Played for: Houston Aeros
- Playing career: 1951–1978

Cleland Lindsay "Keke" Mortson (March 29, 1934 – December 8, 1995) was a Canadian professional ice hockey player who played 73 games in the World Hockey Association for the Houston Aeros. His hockey career spanned 27 years, which included playing more than 1,000 games in minor league hockey, and 576 games in the American Hockey League. Mortson was posthumously inducted into the North Bay Sports Hall of Fame in 1996.

== Early life ==
Cleland Lindsay Mortson was born on March 29, 1934, in Arntfield, Quebec. He was the second of five children to parents Malcolm and Irene Mortson. He grew up in Swastika, Ontario, then lived in Cobalt, Ontario during World War II.

== Playing career ==
Mortson played the centre and right wing positions in hockey. His first semi-professional season was in 1952–53, with the New Haven Nutmegs. After briefly returning to junior hockey, he finished the 1953–54 season playing his first three professional games with the Cleveland Barons. His first complete professional season was in 1954–55, with the Troy Bruins in the International Hockey League, scoring 25 goals. The Bruins played in the Turner Cup finals, losing in seven games. He then returned to Canada, playing four seasons of senior hockey before getting another chance to play professionally.

The National Hockey League established the Eastern Professional Hockey League in 1959, and Mortson joined the Sudbury Wolves team. Sudbury finished first place in 1960, and were runners up for the Tom Foley Memorial Trophy in the playoffs. Mortson played two and a half seasons in the EPHL with Sudbury, and still had the fourth most assists, and eighth most points in the history of the four-year league. Mortson moved up to the Hershey Bears partway through the 1961–62 season. He scored 32 goals in the 1962–63 season, as Hershey reached the Calder Cup finals, but lost in game seven. Mortson moved closer to home, and played four full seasons with the Quebec Aces. He scored a personal best 33 goals in the 1965–66 season, finished second in the league with 95 points, and was named an AHL second team all-star.

Mortson was recruited by Murray Costello to move west in 1967, and join the Seattle Totems. At age 34, he played in all 72 games that regular season, and in the playoffs won his first team championship as a player, winning the Lester Patrick Cup, as champions of the Western Hockey League. Mortson returned to the AHL for the 1968–69 season with the Baltimore Clippers, but partway through the next season, he went back to the WHL with the Vancouver Canucks. In the 1970 playoffs, the Canucks won the Lester Patrick Cup, giving Mortson his second championship.

Mortson would end up playing with a different team each season, for the remainder of his career. He played with the Rochester Americans in the 1970–71 season, then the Dallas Black Hawks in the 1970–71 season. Playing with Dallas, his team reached the Adams Cup finals in the Central Hockey League, but lost in six games. Mortson who was now 37 years old, returned to the AHL in the 1971–72 season, and was named captain of the Cincinnati Swords. His team placed third in the regular season, only one point out of first place, and reach the second round of the playoffs. The World Hockey Association was founded in 1972, and Mortson at age 38, made his major league debut with the Houston Aeros in the 1972–73 season. He played 67 games in the season, scoring 13 goals, as the oldest player on the team.

The Southern Hockey League was founded in 1973, and Mortson played for the Macon Whoopees. While playing, he was also hired to be the team's head coach, and general manager. Mortson was hired because he was the favourite player of team owner Jerry Pinkerton, when Mortson played in Hershey. Mortson used his WHA connections to establish affiliation agreements with both the Houston Aeros and Cleveland Crusaders. Mortson was the team's leading scorer, with 24 goals, and 51 assists in 59 games, and was also the first hockey player to wear the number 99. When the Whoopees folded in February due to financial issues, Mortson had led the team to 22 wins in 62 games. Mortson finished the remainder of the 1973–74 season with the Jacksonville Barons, and was named team captain.

After taking a year off, at age 42 Mortson played 16 games including playoffs, for the Buffalo Norsemen of the North American Hockey League. Mortson returned briefly two years later with the Houston Aeros as a late season replacement, playing six games during the season, and two more in the WHA playoffs at age 44. When returning to the Aeros in 1978, he was warned to be careful then replied, "Be careful? That's no good – you're not trying if you do that". He retired with 1,401 points scored in 1,410 professional games played, including 348 goals.

== Personal life ==
Mortson spent summers in North Bay, Ontario, playing fastpitch softball from the late-1950s until 1975, then umpired softball from 1975 to 1985. After his professional career, he retired to North Bay, and played oldtimers hockey and softball. In 1985, he coached the North Bay Sun Life team to an Ontario Baseball Association midget championship. He was also involved with the annual John D'Amico skate-a-thon fundraiser for Easter Seals. He also contributed annually to an academic award for a student in Swastika.

Mortson had two children with his first wife was Clara, and a stepson with his second wife Jane. He died at his home in North Bay, on December 8, 1995, after a short illness. His remains were cremated and interred in Terrace Lawn Cemetery in North Bay.

The North Bay Sports Hall of Fame posthumously inducted Mortson in 1996. He had first been elected to the hall of fame in 1989, but asked for it to be deferred. He was remembered by the North Bay Nugget as "a very colorful and vocal individual", and posthumously named chairman of the annual old-timers softball tournament in North Bay.

== Career statistics ==
Regular season and playoffs statistics.

			Regular Season					Playoffs
Season	Team	League	GP	G	A	Pts	PIM	GP	G	A	Pts	PIM
1951–52	Kitchener Greenshirts	OHA Jr.	3	0	0	0	0	–	–	–	–	–
1952–53	New Haven Nutmegs	EAHL	58	17	52	69	55	5	4	2	6	7
1953–54	Barrie Flyers	OHA Jr.	statistics unavailable
1953–54	Cleveland Barons	AHL	3	0	1	1	0	–	–	–	–	–
1954–55	Troy Bruins	IHL	60	25	23	48	108	11	3	0	3	39
1955–56	Sault Ste. Marie Greyhounds	OHA Sr.	statistics unavailable
1956–57	Sault Ste. Marie Greyhounds	OHA Sr.	57	24	30	54	130	–	–	–	–	–
1957–58	Sault Ste. Marie Greyhounds	OHA Sr.	23	7	12	19	18	–	–	–	–	–
1957–58	North Bay Trappers	OHA Sr.	33	9	20	29	64	–	–	–	–	–
1958–59	North Bay Trappers	OHA Sr.	53	35	42	77	69	–	–	–	–	–
1959–60	Sudbury Wolves	EPHL	58	25	55	80	70	14	4	5	9	25
1960–61	Sudbury Wolves	EPHL	64	25	45	70	94	–	–	–	–	–
1960–61	Hershey Bears	AHL	–	–	–	–	–	1	0	0	0	0
1961–62	Sudbury Wolves	EPHL	42	18	31	49	75	–	–	–	–	–
1961–62	Hershey Bears	AHL	24	13	11	24	34	7	1	2	3	15
1962–63	Hershey Bears	AHL	72	32	54	86	97	15	4	11	15	42
1963–64	Quebec Aces	AHL	71	28	55	83	122	9	7	6	13	13
1964–65	Quebec Aces	AHL	71	29	43	72	75	5	1	2	3	4
1965–66	Quebec Aces	AHL	65	33	62	95	56	6	1	3	4	0
1966–67	Quebec Aces	AHL	58	15	34	49	78	4	1	2	3	0
1967–68	Seattle Totems	WHL	72	11	21	32	58	9	1	2	3	0
1968–69	Baltimore Clippers	AHL	74	20	49	69	141	4	0	1	1	6
1969–70	Baltimore Clippers	AHL	4	2	4	6	2	–	–	–	–	–
1969–70	Vancouver Canucks	WHL	55	5	12	17	39	11	0	1	1	34
1970–71	Rochester Americans	AHL	44	6	21	27	84	–	–	–	–	–
1970–71	Dallas Black Hawks	CHL	10	2	13	15	6	10	4	7	11	11
1971–72	Cincinnati Swords	AHL	76	17	50	67	133	10	4	7	11	59
1972–73	Houston Aeros	WHA	67	13	16	29	95	10	0	3	3	16
1973–74	Macon Whoopees	SHL	59	24	51	75	135	–	–	–	–	–
1973–74	Jacksonville Barons	AHL	14	5	16	21	18	–	–	–	–	–
1975–76	Buffalo Norsemen	NAHL	12	8	9	17	29	4	3	2	5	2
1977–78	Houston Aeros	WHA	6	0	1	1	7	2	0	1	1	0
AHL Totals			576	203	400	603	840	61	19	34	53	139
EPHL Totals			164	68	131	199	239	14	4	5	9	25
WHL totals			127	16	33	49	97	20	1	3	4	34
WHA Totals			73	13	17	30	102	12	0	4	4	16
