= Macon Whoopee (CHL) =

Ice hockey team in the Central Hockey League from 1996 to 2001

- Final Whoopee Logo (2000–02)
- Sport: Ice hockey
- Founded: 1996
- Folded: 2001
- League: Central Hockey League
- Based in: Macon, Georgia

The Macon Whoopee were a professional ice hockey team that played from 1996 until 2001 in the Central Hockey League (CHL). Located in Macon, Georgia, the team played its home games at the Macon Coliseum.

== History ==
A professional ice hockey team known as the Macon Whoopees, played in the Southern Hockey League during the 1973–74 season, but poor attendance led the team to disband mid-season.

Hockey was not resurrected in Macon until 1996. The new team, known as the "Whoopee" (without the plural "s"), played in the Central Hockey League from 1996 to 2001. After several owners endured seasons of poor attendance and financial losses, the team went bankrupt in 2001.

Hockey stayed in Macon for the 2001–02 season when the Tallahassee Tiger Sharks of the East Coast Hockey League (ECHL) were relocated to Macon, Georgia, where they also became known as the Macon Whoopee, but they played just one season in Macon.

Later efforts to continue professional hockey in Macon led to the formation of the Macon Trax, also now defunct. In 2015, the Southern Professional Hockey League added the Macon Mayhem as a relocation of the former Augusta RiverHawks.

== Etymology ==
The name 'Whoopee' was a reference to a sexual slang, popularized by the Gus Kahn-penned tune "Makin' Whoopee" and the TV game show The Newlywed Game. Facilitating the double entendre, the second team's mascot was the whooping crane, menaced by a bee ("the birds and the bees").
