= Richmond Wildcats =

American minor league professional ice hockey team (1976–77)

- City: Richmond, Virginia
- League: Southern Hockey League
- Operated: 1976–77
- Home arena: Richmond Coliseum
- Colors: White, silver, sky blue, black
- Head coach: Forbes Kennedy
- Affiliates: New York Rangers; St. Louis Blues

The Richmond Wildcats were a minor league professional ice hockey team based in Richmond, Virginia. Richmond joined the Southern Hockey League as an expansion team in 1976, and replaced the void at the Richmond Coliseum, when the Richmond Robins ceased operations. The Wildcats were affiliated with the New York Rangers, and the St. Louis Blues, for the 1976–77 Southern Hockey League season. Forbes Kennedy was named the team's coach. The offence was led by Barry Scully with 44 points, Claude Periard with 30 goals, and Lorne Rombough with 28 goals.

The ownership group was originally led by Dwight Neal, who signed the team's letter of credit, but he was no longer involved when the season began. Three months into the season, new principal owner Steve Fox announced the team may dissolve due to $30,000 in losses. The SHL was ready to cancel the franchise, but Kennedy and the players agreed to take the gate receipts without insurance, until new owners were found. After a game against the Tidewater Sharks on January 4, 1977, the players voted not to continue, and the franchise folded 38 games into the season.

== Notable players ==
Notable Wildcats players that also played in the National Hockey League or World Hockey Association:

- Willie Brossart
- Andre Gill
- Bill Goldthorpe
- Greg Hickey
- Keith Kokkola
- Ralph MacSweyn
- Jim McCrimmon
- Lorne Rombough
- Danny Schock

== Results ==
Richmond won 21 games, compared to 16 losses and a tie, and earned the fifth most points in the league.

| Season | GP | W | L | T | Pts | Pct | GF | GA | PIM | Standing | Playoffs |
|---|---|---|---|---|---|---|---|---|---|---|---|
| 1976–77 | 38 | 21 | 16 | 1 | 43 | 0.566 | 160 | 144 | 602 | 5th, SHL | Folded |
