= Doug Rombough =

Canadian ice hockey player

- Born: July 8, 1950 Fergus, Ontario, Canada
- Died: June 20, 2015 (aged 64) Plantation, Florida, U.S.
- Height: 6 ft 3 in (191 cm)
- Weight: 200 lb (91 kg; 14 st 4 lb)
- Position: Centre
- Shot: Left
- Played for: Buffalo Sabres; New York Islanders; Minnesota North Stars
- NHL draft: 97th overall, 1970; Buffalo Sabres
- Playing career: 1970–1978

Douglas George Rombough (/ˈrɒmboʊ/ ROM-boh; July 8, 1950 – June 20, 2015) was a Canadian professional ice hockey centre. He was drafted in the eighth round, 97th overall, by the Buffalo Sabres in the 1970 NHL Amateur Draft. He played in the National Hockey League with the Sabres, New York Islanders, and Minnesota North Stars between 1973 and 1975. Rombaugh was born in Fergus, Ontario and raised in Fort Erie, Ontario.

In his NHL career, Rombough appeared in 150 games. He scored twenty-four goals and added twenty-seven assists.

On June 20, 2015, Rombough died In the hospital in Plantation, Florida. He was the brother of Lorne Rombough, who played briefly in the WHA.

== Career statistics ==
=== Regular season and playoffs ===
| | | | Regular season | | | | | Playoffs |
| Season | Team | League | GP | G | A | Pts | PIM | GP | G | A | Pts | PIM |
|---|---|---|---|---|---|---|---|---|---|---|---|---|
| 1967–68 | Erie Otters | OHA-B | — | — | — | — | — | — | — | — | — | — |
| 1968–69 | St. Catharines Black Hawks | OHA | 53 | 12 | 13 | 25 | 15 | 17 | 1 | 1 | 2 | 2 |
| 1969–70 | St. Catharines Black Hawks | OHA | 53 | 14 | 13 | 27 | 36 | 10 | 2 | 4 | 6 | 2 |
| 1970–71 | Flint Generals | IHL | 65 | 22 | 36 | 58 | 26 | 7 | 1 | 5 | 6 | 2 |
| 1971–72 | Cincinnati Swords | AHL | 76 | 22 | 26 | 48 | 42 | 10 | 4 | 4 | 8 | 22 |
| 1972–73 | Buffalo Sabres | NHL | 5 | 2 | 0 | 2 | 0 | — | — | — | — | — |
| 1972–73 | Cincinnati Swords | AHL | 66 | 28 | 43 | 71 | 48 | 14 | 10 | 8 | 18 | 26 |
| 1973–74 | Buffalo Sabres | NHL | 46 | 6 | 9 | 15 | 27 | — | — | — | — | — |
| 1973–74 | New York Islanders | NHL | 12 | 3 | 1 | 4 | 8 | — | — | — | — | — |
| 1974–75 | New York Islanders | NHL | 28 | 5 | 6 | 11 | 6 | — | — | — | — | — |
| 1974–75 | Minnesota North Stars | NHL | 40 | 6 | 9 | 15 | 33 | — | — | — | — | — |
| 1975–76 | Minnesota North Stars | NHL | 19 | 2 | 2 | 4 | 6 | — | — | — | — | — |
| 1975–76 | New Haven Nighthawks | AHL | 42 | 5 | 20 | 25 | 28 | 3 | 0 | 0 | 0 | 0 |
| 1976–77 | New Haven Nighthawks | AHL | 4 | 0 | 0 | 0 | 0 | — | — | — | — | — |
| 1976–77 | Dallas Black Hawks | CHL | 70 | 21 | 25 | 46 | 24 | 5 | 1 | 0 | 1 | 0 |
| 1977–78 | Fort Worth Texans | CHL | 73 | 23 | 34 | 57 | 38 | 14 | 3 | 3 | 6 | 9 |
| AHL totals | | | 188 | 55 | 89 | 144 | 118 | 27 | 14 | 12 | 26 | 48 |
| NHL totals | | | 150 | 24 | 27 | 51 | 80 | — | — | — | — | — |
