= Macon Whoopees (SHL) =

Professional ice hockey team

- City: Macon, Georgia
- League: Southern Hockey League
- Operated: 1973–74
- Home arena: Macon Coliseum
- Colors: Red, white, blue
- Owner: Jerry Pinkerton
- General manager: Keke Mortson
- Head coach: Keke Mortson
- Affiliates: Cleveland Crusaders; Houston Aeros

The Macon Whoopees were a minor league professional ice hockey team based in Macon, Georgia, and played home games at the Macon Coliseum. The Whoopees played in the Southern Hockey League, and were the second professional hockey team in Georgia. The attempt in Macon to expand hockey southward failed, as the team ceased operations before completion of the 1973–74 season. Hockey did not return to Macon until 1996, when the name was revived by the Macon Whoopee in the Central Hockey League. The original Whoopees team was named after the song "Makin' Whoopee" by Gus Kahn, and is the subject of the book Once Upon A Whoopee: A Town, A Team, A Song, A Dream, by Ed Grisamore and Bill Buckley.

== History ==
The first attempt to bring professional hockey to Georgia was made in 1968, by the Eastern Hockey League. The Macon Coliseum was completed in 1968, and was the first facility in the state with an ice surface, and the seating capacity to host professional hockey. The EHL considered an expansion team for the 1968–69 season, but opted instead to have the Jacksonville Rockets play six home games at the coliseum to gauge interest.

In 1973, the Southern Hockey League (SHL) was created when the four southernmost teams in the EHL broke away to form their own league, partially due to travel costs of going to northern arenas. The SHL sought to expand in the Southeastern United States, and targeted Macon due to the new arena, and its Interstate 75 proximity on a direct route for teams in North Carolina and Virginia playing the Suncoast Suns. The league chose Jerry Pinkerton, a stockbroker from Atlanta, as the franchise owner. The SHL and Pinkerton believed the timing was right for Macon. The population had grown rapidly, surpassing 120,000 residents as of the 1970 United States census. The Omni Coliseum had just opened up in 1972, and the National Hockey League came to Georgia with the Atlanta Flames. The SHL and its commissioner Tedd Munchak, were desperate enough for a sixth team, that Munchak himself put up the $25,000 expansion fee, and appointed a league businessman to help raise the $300,000 in expected operating expenses.

The choice of name arose from Pinkerton's favorite song being the Doris Day version of "Makin' Whoopee", and the euphemism being popularized on The Newlywed Game by Bob Eubanks. The Macon Whoopees were officially announced at press conference on July 4, 1973, as one of the six teams in the inaugural season of the Southern Hockey League. The Whoopees made affiliation agreements with the Houston Aeros, and Cleveland Crusaders in the World Hockey Association. Keke Mortson from the Aeros was hired as general manager and player-coach, and Bill Buckley was named his assistant, and the club's business manager. Pinkerton was able to secure investors from Atlanta, New York City, and Macon in September.

People in Georgia knew little about hockey, but the fighting was similar to professional wrestling. In promoting the team, management mentioned similarities to football, and held information sessions with civic groups, schools, and churches. Pamphlets for season tickets included explanations of hockey, as did the team's pocket schedule. Radio stations in central Georgia played the Doris Day song frequently, local press and television stories were used to promote the team, Sports Illustrated, and The Wall Street Journal ran items on the team, and 5,000 t‐shirts were sold in advance.

When the team hit the ice in October, jerseys resembled the colors and patterns of the Montreal Canadiens. The Whoopees debuted at home on October 12, 1973, versus the Suncoast Suns. Macon won 5–4 in overtime, in a game that included seven fights, but many fans left after the second period, not knowing it was three periods. Doris Day was invited to sing the national anthem on opening night, but declined. The Whoopees sat in second place for the early part of the season, and Mortson led the team in scoring, with 24 goals, 51 assists, and 75 points.

The Whoopees could not make payroll in November, and resorted to giving players free rent and television sets to stay with the team. The Whoopees averaged only 1,100 spectators for home games, since Wednesdays and Sundays were local church nights. The team forfeited a game against the Charlotte Checkers on January 17, 1974, when players refused to play due to not being paid. The team was subsequently shut down by the Internal Revenue Service on February 15, 1974, for unpaid taxes. The Whoopees won 22 games, lost 38 games, and had 2 ties, in 62 games played.

== Players ==
Twelve Whoopees players also played in the National Hockey League or World Hockey Association:

- Ray Adduono
- Blake Ball
- Normand Cournoyer
- Bob Dupuis
- Ron Grahame
- Ed Hoekstra
- Jim McMasters
- Ron Morgan
- Keke Mortson
- Al Rycroft
- Jack Stanfield
- Gary Williamson

== Results ==
Season-by-season results:

Season	GP	W	L	T	Pts	Pct	GF	GA	PIM	Standing	Playoffs
1973–74	62	22	38	2	46	0.371	244	290	1233	5th, SHL	Folded
