= Lorne Rombough =

Canadian ice hockey player

- Born: April 2, 1948 (age 78) Fergus, Ontario, Canada
- Height: 5 ft 11 in (180 cm)
- Weight: 190 lb (86 kg; 13 st 8 lb)
- Position: Left wing
- Shot: Left
- Played for: WHA; Chicago Cougars; IHL; Fort Wayne Komets; Flint Generals; Dayton Gems; Toledo Hornets; EHL; Long Island Ducks; AHL; Rochester Americans; NAHL; Long Island Cougars; SHL; Hampton Gulls; Charlotte Checkers; Richmond Wildcats; PHL; San Francisco Shamrocks; NEHL; Jersey/Hampton Aces
- NHL draft: Undrafted
- Playing career: 1968–1980

Lorne David Rombough (April 2, 1948- November 13, 2019) was a Canadian professional ice hockey player.

During the 1973–74 season, Rombough played three games in the World Hockey Association with the Chicago Cougars. He is the brother of NHL player Doug Rombough.

== Career statistics ==
=== Regular season and playoffs ===
| | | | Regular season | | | | | Playoffs |
| Season | Team | League | GP | G | A | Pts | PIM | GP | G | A | Pts | PIM |
|---|---|---|---|---|---|---|---|---|---|---|---|---|
| 1967–68 | University of Buffalo | NCAA | Statistics Unavailable |
| 1968–69 | Brantford Foresters | WOJAHL | Statistics Unavailable |
| 1968–69 | Fort Wayne Komets | IHL | 1 | 1 | 0 | 1 | 0 | — | — | — | — | — |
| 1969–70 | Flint Generals | IHL | 49 | 17 | 16 | 33 | 28 | — | — | — | — | — |
| 1970–71 | Long Island–Greens | EHL | 41 | 16 | 13 | 29 | 26 | — | — | — | — | — |
| 1970–71 | Flint–Dayton | IHL | 7 | 1 | 2 | 3 | 5 | — | — | — | — | — |
| 1971–72 | Long Island Ducks | EHL | 75 | 42 | 35 | 77 | 80 | — | — | — | — | — |
| 1972–73 | Toledo Hornets | IHL | 36 | 11 | 13 | 24 | 26 | 4 | 0 | 0 | 0 | 2 |
| 1972–73 | Rochester Americans | AHL | 26 | 6 | 10 | 16 | 17 | — | — | — | — | — |
| 1973–74 | Long Island Cougars | NAHL | 68 | 50 | 42 | 92 | 37 | 17 | 8 | 6 | 14 | 20 |
| 1973–74 | Chicago Cougars | WHA | 3 | 1 | 2 | 3 | 0 | — | — | — | — | — |
| 1974–75 | Hampton Gulls | SHL | 72 | 56 | 43 | 99 | 20 | 13 | 7 | 8 | 15 | 2 |
| 1975–76 | Hampton Gulls | SHL | 70 | 26 | 36 | 62 | 18 | 9 | 4 | 3 | 7 | 0 |
| 1976–77 | Charlotte Checkers | SHL | 12 | 2 | 1 | 3 | 2 | — | — | — | — | — |
| 1976–77 | Richmond Wildcats | SHL | 37 | 28 | 14 | 42 | 18 | — | — | — | — | — |
| 1977–78 | San Francisco Shamrocks | PHL | 30 | 12 | 7 | 19 | 2 | — | — | — | — | — |
| 1978–79 | Jersey/Hampton Aces | NEHL | 50 | 17 | 17 | 34 | 20 | — | — | — | — | — |
| 1979–80 | Hampton Aces | EHL | 9 | 3 | 4 | 7 | 4 | — | — | — | — | — |
| WHA totals | | | 3 | 1 | 2 | 3 | 0 | — | — | — | — | — |
