= Fayetteville rifle =

Rifled musket used by the Confederate States Army

Fayetteville Rifled Musket
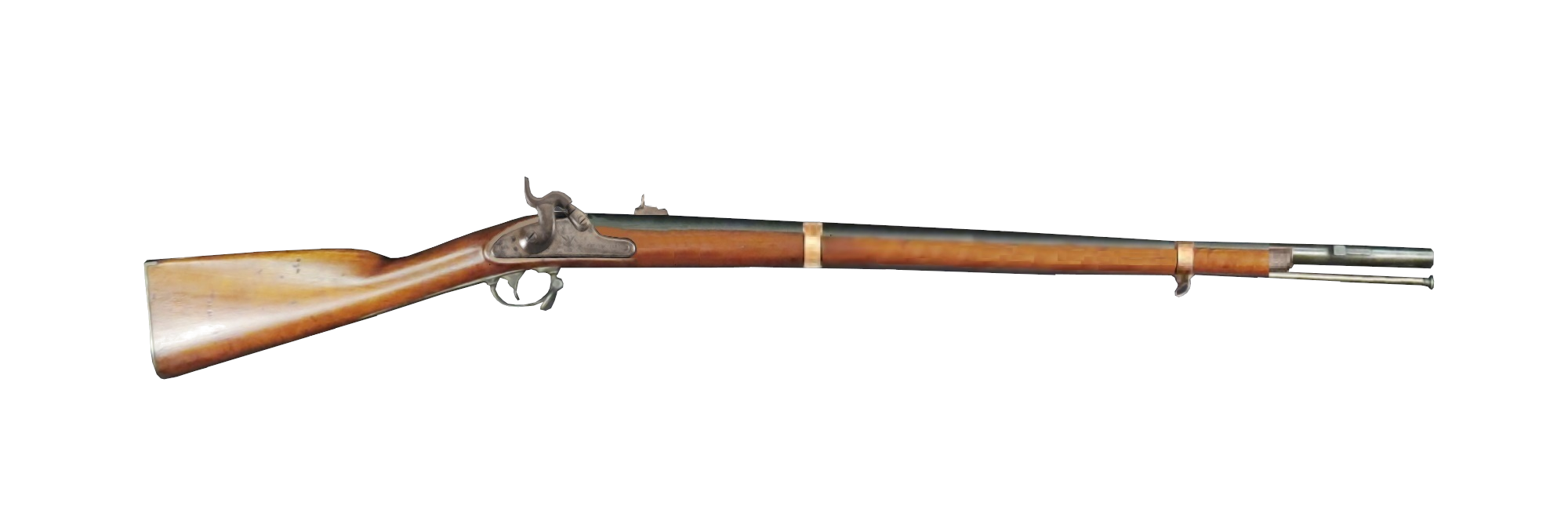
- Type: Muzzle-loading rifle
- Place of origin: Confederate States

Service history
- In service: 1862–1865
- Used by: Confederate States
- Wars: American Civil War

Production history
- Designed: 1862
- Manufacturer: Fayetteville Arsenal
- Produced: 1862–1865
- No. built: 31,762

Specifications
- Mass: 12 lbs (5.4 kg)
- Length: 49.5 in (1,260 mm)
- Cartridge: .58 ball
- Caliber: 0.58 in (15 mm)
- Action: Percussion lock
- Effective firing range: 500 yd (460 m)
- Maximum firing range: 800 yd (730 m)
- Feed system: Muzzle-loaded
- Sights: Blade front sight, laef-adjustable rear sight

The Fayetteville Rifle was a 2 banded C.S. rifle produced at the Fayetteville Arsenal in North Carolina and subsequently for the C.S. Ordnance Department.

== History ==
The machinery which produced these weapons was primarily that captured at the United States Arsenal at Harpers Ferry, Virginia, which was previously used to produce the US Model 1855 Rifle.

Numerous skilled laborers and craftsmen transitioned from Harpers Ferry to Fayetteville to assist in installing machinery and manufacturing rifles essential to the Confederate military effort. Their technical proficiency guaranteed that the Fayetteville Rifle, predominantly based on the standard U.S. military model, maintained a high level of quality decision by James H. Burton and Major Josiah Gorgas, Chief of Ordnance. The relocation of these workers generated political tension, as Virginia officials anticipated that the Harpers Ferry employees would persist in producing armaments for their state, considering the Capital's arsenal had previously been situated within its borders, which highlights the conflicting requirements and objectives among the Confederate states throughout the war.

The weapon was produced in .58 caliber from early in 1862 until the capture and destruction of the arsenal by Union forces under General W. T. Sherman on March 11, 1865.

In February, 1862, the Fayetteville Observer, in describing the beginning of arms’ manufacturing at the arsenal, reported:

A few days ago we were shown one of a number of rifles furnished at the C. S. Armory here. It is much the same in general appearance, as the U.S. rifle for some years made at Harper’s Ferry and at Springfield, Mass.; but for certain improvements, in the matter of sword bayonet, Maynard primer, and perfection of finish in all parts, it must be pronounced very superior. The back sights are set for 800 and 500 yards. Altogether, we think it the handsomest specimen of small arms, rifle or musket, we have ever seen-reflecting the greatest credit upon all concerned with its manufacture.

=== Type of rifle variant ===
The first examples were manufactured using assorted M1855 lock blanks and are mounted in iron production with high and medium high lockplate humps. Type I (Early 1862) utilized unmilled Harpers Ferry lockplates, characterized by a prominent "hump" at the former Maynard primer location, frequently mounted in reuse iron. Type II (Late 1862) incorporated newly manufactured Richmond locks, featuring a reduced hump designed to align with the stock contour. Later examples are mounted in brass with a graceful S-shaped hammer. Only the very early examples are known to have a patch box. Fayetteville began producing its own lockplates, similar to the U.S. Springfield M1861 but with a distinctive S-shaped hammer for Type III (1863).

The rifle was made both with and without a special bayonet lug which allowed the use of a sword bayonet, Type IV (1864–1865) followed General Order #6 (January 1864), switching to a socket bayonet system.

The weapons are highly rare and collectible, and examples in pristine condition can command prices in excess of $25,000.

== See also ==
- Rifles in the American Civil War
