= Jim McMasters =

Canadian ice hockey player

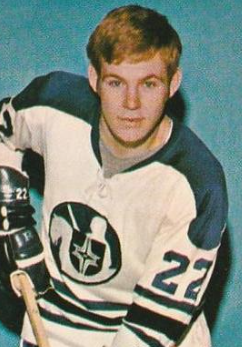
- McMasters in 1972–73
- Born: September 20, 1952 (age 73) High River, Alberta, Canada
- Height: 5 ft 10 in (178 cm)
- Weight: 195 lb (88 kg; 13 st 13 lb)
- Position: Defence/Left wing
- Played for: Cleveland Crusaders (WHA)
- NHL draft: 37th overall, 1972; Buffalo Sabres
- Playing career: 1972–1977

Jim McMasters (born September 20, 1952) is a Canadian former professional ice hockey forward. He was drafted by the Buffalo Sabres of the National Hockey League in the third round, 37th overall, of the 1972 NHL entry draft; however, he never played in that league. He played 83 regular-season games and nine playoff games in the World Hockey Association with the Cleveland Crusaders in the 1972–73 and 1973–74 seasons. McMasters was born in High River, Alberta, but grew up in Nanton, Alberta.

== Career statistics ==
			Regular season					Playoffs
Season	Team	League	GP	G	A	Pts	PIM	GP	G	A	Pts	PIM
1970-71	Calgary Centennials	WCHL	66	22	25	47	91
1971-72	Calgary Centennials	WCHL	65	12	48	60	94
1972-73	Cleveland Crusaders	WHA	74	1	7	8	37	9	0	1	1	6
1973-74	Macon Whoopees	SHL-Sr.	24	1	15	16	19
1973-74	Jacksonville Barons	AHL	42	2	9	11	30
1973-74	Cleveland Crusaders	WHA	9	0	0	0	4
1974-75	Omaha Knights	CHL	61	2	14	16	88	3	0	0	0	2
1975-76	Kramfors-Alliansen	Division 1	-	4	3	7	-
1976-77	MODO	SHL	30	0	5	5	28
