= Alf Handrahan =

Canadian ice hockey player

- Born: December 27, 1949 (age 76) Alberton, Prince Edward Island, Canada
- Height: 5 ft 9 in (175 cm)
- Weight: 185 lb (84 kg; 13 st 3 lb)
- Position: Right wing
- Shot: Right
- Played for: Cincinnati Stingers
- Playing career: 1973–1978

Alf Handrahan (born December 27, 1949) is a former Canadian professional ice hockey player who played in the World Hockey Association (WHA). During his five year career, he played for the Tulsa Oilers, the Oklahoma City Blazers, the Fort Worth Texans, and the Cincinnati Stingers. He was born in Alberton, Prince Edward Island.

On the ice, Handrahan was known for his aggressive, "all-action" style of play which led to frequent fights and penalties. While attending the Maple Leafs training camp, Handrahan got into five fights, all of which he won. During his professional career, Handrahan was a polarizing figure, earning a "fan favourite" award from his team during his first season, while often subjected to insults and thrown objects from visiting fans after fights. Handrahan retired from professional hockey in 1978, and pursued a career with the Oklahoma Gas and Electric Company.

Handrahan was inducted into the Prince Edward Island Sports Hall of Fame on September 2, 2006.

== Career statistics ==
=== Regular season and playoffs ===
			Regular season					Playoffs
Season	Team	League	GP	G	A	Pts	PIM	GP	G	A	Pts	PIM
1973–74	Tulsa Oilers	CHL	71	22	38	60	240	—	—	—	—	—
1974–75	Oklahoma City Blazers	CHL	73	23	38	61	244	5	0	0	0	11
1975–76	Oklahoma City Blazers	CHL	39	3	12	15	136	—	—	—	—	—
1975–76	Fort Worth Texans	CHL	23	5	5	10	69	—	—	—	—	—
1976–77	Fort Worth Texans	CHL	74	25	32	57	187	6	1	1	2	21
1977–78	Philadelphia Firebirds	AHL	51	6	15	21	111	—	—	—	—	—
1977–78	Cincinnati Stingers	WHA	14	1	3	4	42	—	—	—	—	—
WHA totals			14	1	3	4	42	—	—	—	—	—
