= Dave Inkpen =

Canadian ice hockey player

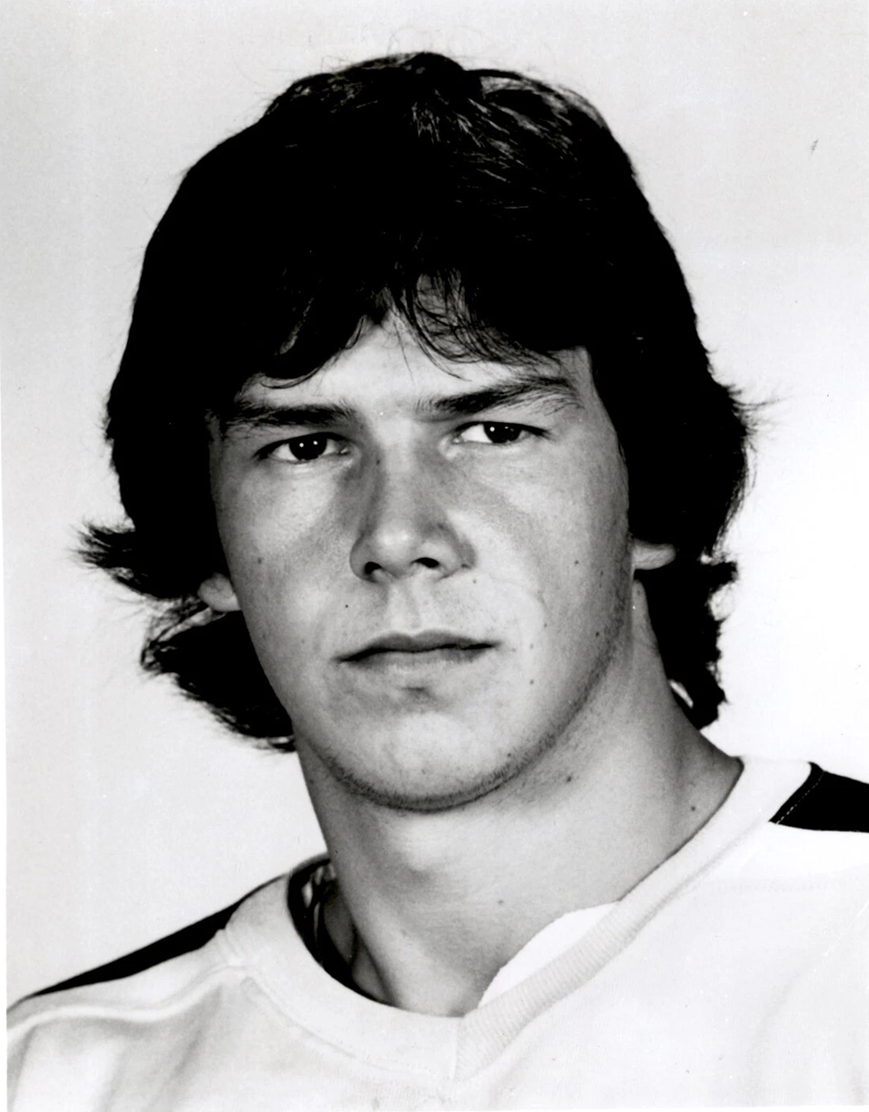
- Inkpen in the 1970s
- Born: September 4, 1954 (age 71) Edmonton, Alberta, Canada
- Height: 6 ft 0 in (183 cm)
- Weight: 185 lb (84 kg; 13 st 3 lb)
- Position: Defence
- Shot: Right
- Played for: Cincinnati Stingers; Indianapolis Racers; Edmonton Oilers; Quebec Nordiques; New England Whalers
- NHL draft: 129th overall, 1974; New York Islanders
- WHA draft: 18th overall, 1974; Cincinnati Stingers
- Playing career: 1974–1985

Dave Inkpen (born September 4, 1954, in Edmonton, Alberta) is a Canadian retired professional ice hockey player who played 293 games in the World Hockey Association. He played for the Indianapolis Racers, Quebec Nordiques, Cincinnati Stingers, Edmonton Oilers, and New England Whalers.

== Career statistics ==
			Regular season					Playoffs
Season	Team	League	GP	G	A	Pts	PIM	GP	G	A	Pts	PIM
1971–72	Edmonton Oil Kings	WCHL	52	3	11	14	42	—	—	—	—	—
1972–73	Edmonton Oil Kings	WCHL	68	5	30	35	172	—	—	—	—	—
1973–74	Edmonton Oil Kings	WCHL	57	11	42	53	141	—	—	—	—	—
1974–75	Flint Generals	IHL	47	9	23	32	55	—	—	—	—	—
1974–75	Des Moines Capitols	IHL	—	—	—	—	—	7	1	1	2	0
1974–75	Fort Worth Texans	CHL	5	0	0	0	5	—	—	—	—	—
1975–76	Cincinnati Stingers	WHA	80	4	24	28	95	—	—	—	—	—
1976–77	Cincinnati Stingers	WHA	48	3	14	17	61	—	—	—	—	—
1976–77	Indianapolis Racers	WHA	32	4	12	16	20	9	0	2	2	8
1977–78	Indianapolis Racers	WHA	24	1	9	10	24	—	—	—	—	—
1977–78	Edmonton Oilers	WHA	19	0	1	1	16	—	—	—	—	—
1977–78	Quebec Nordiques	WHA	24	0	1	1	20	—	—	—	—	—
1978–79	Springfield Indians	AHL	12	1	2	3	15	—	—	—	—	—
1978–79	Indianapolis Racers	WHA	25	1	8	9	22	—	—	—	—	—
1978–79	New England Whalers	WHA	41	0	7	7	15	5	0	1	1	4
1979–80	Springfield Indians	AHL	64	5	20	25	101	—	—	—	—	—
1980–81	EHC Essen	Germany2	17	10	12	22	43	—	—	—	—	—
1981–82	EHC Essen	Germany2	44	27	29	56	96	—	—	—	—	—
1982–83	EHC Essen	Germany2	29	13	22	35	81	—	—	—	—	—
1983–84	EHC Essen-West	Germany2	42	16	34	50	131	—	—	—	—	—
1984–85	ECD Iserlohn	Germany	8	0	3	3	20	—	—	—	—	—
WHA totals			293	13	76	89	273	14	0	3	3	12
