= Ted Long (ice hockey) =

Canadian ice hockey player

- Born: January 26, 1955 (age 71) Woodstock, Ontario, Canada
- Height: 6 ft 1 in (185 cm)
- Weight: 185 lb (84 kg; 13 st 3 lb)
- Position: Defence / Left wing
- Shot: Left
- Played for: Cincinnati Stingers
- NHL draft: 78th overall, 1975; Toronto Maple Leafs
- WHA draft: 53rd overall, 1975; Winnipeg Jets
- Playing career: 1976–1980

Edward "Ted" Long (born January 26, 1955) is a Canadian former professional ice hockey defenceman and left winger who played in the World Hockey Association (WHA).

== Early life and education ==
Long was born in Woodstock, Ontario. He played junior hockey with the Hamilton Red Wings, Niagara Falls Flyers, and Hamilton Fincups.

== Career ==
Drafted in the fifth round of the 1975 NHL Amateur Draft by the Toronto Maple Leafs, Long opted to play in the WHA after being selected by the Winnipeg Jets in the fourth round of the 1975 WHA Amateur Draft. He played in one game for the Cincinnati Stingers during the 1976–77 WHA season. Long played for the Hampton Gulls and Woodstock Royals before retiring at the end of the 1979–1980 season.

== Awards ==
- 1975–76 OMJHL Third All-Star Team
- Named to all-time Hamilton (OMJHL/OHL) team

== Career statistics ==
=== Regular season and playoffs ===
			Regular season					Playoffs
Season	Team	League	GP	G	A	Pts	PIM	GP	G	A	Pts	PIM
1971–72	Hamilton Red Wings	OHA	29	0	3	3	27	—	—	—	—	—
1973–74	Hamilton Red Wings	OHA	13	2	4	6	4	—	—	—	—	—
1973–74	Niagara Falls Flyers	SOJHL	Statistics Unavailable
1974–75	Hamilton Fincups	OHA	61	12	47	59	44	—	—	—	—	—
1975–76	Hamilton Fincups	OHA	62	27	64	91	52	—	—	—	—	—
1976–77	Cincinnati Stingers	WHA	1	0	0	0	0	—	—	—	—	—
1976–77	Springfield Indians	AHL	30	6	7	13	12	—	—	—	—	—
1976–77	Hampton Gulls	SHL	50	16	36	52	45	—	—	—	—	—
1977–78	Woodstock Royals	CSAHL	32	19	27	46	36	—	—	—	—	—
1979–80	Woodstock Royals	CSAHL	Statistics Unavailable
WHA totals			1	0	0	0	0	–	–	–	–	–
