= John Kiely (ice hockey) =

American ice hockey player

- Born: August 3, 1952 (age 73) Ithaca, New York, U.S.
- Height: 6 ft 2 in (188 cm)
- Weight: 190 lb (86 kg; 13 st 8 lb)
- Position: Goaltender
- Caught: Right
- Played for: WHA; Cincinnati Stingers; AHL; Springfield Indians; Binghamton Dusters; CHL; Oklahoma City Blazers
- NHL draft: Undrafted
- Playing career: 1974–1978

John Stuart Kiely (born August 3, 1952) is an American former professional ice hockey goaltender.

== Career ==
Kiely played 22 games in the World Hockey Association with the Cincinnati Stingers during the 1975–76 season. He continued his career in the AHL with the Springfield Indians and Binghamton Dusters, and in the CHL with the Oklahoma City Blazers.

As a goaltender with the Vermont Catamounts men's ice hockey team, Kiely was a part of both ECAC Division II National Championships in 1972-73, and 1973–74. Kiely ranks fifth all-time in save percentage at Vermont (.903) and fourth in goals against average (2.84).

== Career statistics ==
=== Regular season and playoffs ===
			Regular season									Playoffs
Season	Team	League	GP	W	L	T	MIN	GA	SO	GAA	SV%	GP	W	L	MIN	GA	SO	GAA	SV%
1972–73	University of Vermont	ECAC-2	12	—	—	—	211	14	0	1.33	.864	—	—	—	—	—	—	—	—
1973–74	University of Vermont	ECAC-2	33	Statistics Unavailable
1974–75	Syracuse Blazers	NAHL	9	5	3	1	528	28	0	3.18	—	—	—	—	—	—	—	—	—
1975–76	Cincinnati Stingers	WHA	22	6	8	1	1087	78	0	4.31	.871	—	—	—	—	—	—	—	—
1975–76	Hampton Gulls	SHL	13	7	3	2	719	41	1	3.42	.905	—	—	—	—	—	—	—	—
1976–77	Springfield Indians	AHL	6	1	3	0	283	22	0	4.66	.876	—	—	—	—	—	—	—	—
1976–77	Oklahoma City Blazers	CHL	5	1	2	1	189	18	0	5.71	.838	—	—	—	—	—	—	—	—
1976–77	Hampton Gulls	SHL	11	4	6	0	568	35	0	3.70	.886	—	—	—	—	—	—	—	—
1977–78	San Francisco Shamrocks	PHL	1	0	—	—	—	—	—	—	—	—	—	—	—	—	—	—	—
1977–78	Broome Dusters	AHL	2	0	0	1	94	6	0	3.83	.895	—	—	—	—	—	—	—	—
WHA totals			22	6	8	1	1087	78	0	4.31	.871	—	—	—	—	—	—	—	—
