= 1974–75 Southern Hockey League season =

Southern Hockey League
Southern Hockey League teams, 1974–1975.
Active teams Former teams

The 1974–75 Southern Hockey League season was the second season of the Southern Hockey League. On July 31, 1975, Jack Riley was announced as the new commissioner of the SHL, taking over for interim leader Gene Hawthorne, of the Roanoke Valley Rebels. The four existing teams returned from the previous season, joined by a fifth expansion team from Fayetteville, North Carolina. The new team was named after the Fayetteville Arsenal, and was scheduled to play at the Cumberland County Memorial Arena. In October 1974, owner Bill Raue moved the team, to Hampton, Virginia before playing any games, when availability of home ice dates became a problem. The new Hampton Gulls moved into the Hampton Coliseum recently vacated by the Virginia Wings of the American Hockey League. The five teams played a complete schedule of 72 games, with the Charlotte Checkers winning the regular season, and the playoffs.

== Standings ==
Final standings of the regular season.

	GP	W	L	T	GF	GA	Pts
Charlotte Checkers	72	50	21	1	370	256	101
Hampton Gulls	72	43	28	1	323	262	87
Winston-Salem Polar Twins	72	32	40	0	300	345	64
Roanoke Valley Rebels	72	29	41	2	296	304	60
Greensboro Generals	72	23	47	2	262	384	48

== WHA/NHL affiliations ==
Southern Hockey League franchises were primarily affiliated with World Hockey Association teams, however some also had agreements with National Hockey League teams. Summary of WHA/NHL affiliation agreements:

SHL team	WHA parent clubs	NHL parent clubs
Charlotte Checkers	Vancouver Blazers	Buffalo Sabres; California Golden Seals
Greensboro Generals	Michigan Stags/Baltimore Blades	New York Islanders
Hampton Gulls	Cincinnati Stingers	none
Roanoke Valley Rebels	Houston Aeros; Winnipeg Jets	none
Winston-Salem Polar Twins	none	New York Rangers; Detroit Red Wings

== Scoring leaders ==
Top 10 SHL points scoring leaders.

Rank	Player	Team	Goals	Assists	Points
1	Steve Hull	Charlotte	39	75	114
2	Claude Chartre	Hampton	33	79	112
3	Andre Deschamps	Charlotte	59	42	101
4	Lorne Rombough	Hampton	56	43	99
5	Ken Gassoff	Winston-Salem	31	55	86
6	Wayne Zuk	Greensboro	35	49	84
7	Camille LaPierre	Roanoke Valley	35	45	80
7	Wally Olds	Hampton	19	61	80
9	Bobby Guindon	Roanoke Valley	40	38	78
10	Jamie Kennedy	Winston-Salem	37	40	77

== Playoffs ==
James Crockett Cup playoffs.

Semifinals
1	Charlotte Checkers	4
4	Roanoke Valley Rebels	0
2	Hampton Gulls	?
3	Winston-Salem Polar Twins	?

Final
1	Charlotte Checkers	4
2	Hampton Gulls	2
