= Jacques Locas (ice hockey, born 1954) =

Canadian ice hockey player

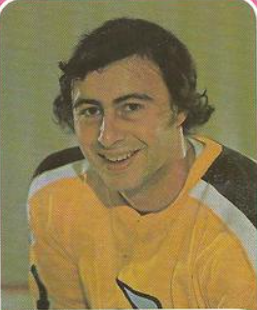
- Locas in 1975 card
- Born: January 7, 1954 Saint-Jérôme, Quebec, Canada
- Died: August 20, 2006 (aged 52)
- Height: 5 ft 8 in (173 cm)
- Weight: 167 lb (76 kg; 11 st 13 lb)
- Position: Centre
- Shot: Right
- Played for: Michigan Stags; Baltimore Blades; Indianapolis Racers; Cincinnati Stingers; Calgary Cowboys
- NHL draft: 184th overall, 1974; Los Angeles Kings
- WHA draft: Undrafted
- Playing career: 1974–1978

Jacques Locas (January 7, 1954 – August 20, 2006) was a Canadian professional ice hockey forward.

== Early life ==
Locas was born in Saint-Jérôme, Quebec. As a youth, he played in the 1966 Quebec International Pee-Wee Hockey Tournament with the Quebec Beavers minor ice hockey team.

== Career ==
Locas played 187 games in the World Hockey Association with the Michigan Stags, Baltimore Blades, Indianapolis Racers, Cincinnati Stingers and Calgary Cowboys.

== Career statistics ==
=== Regular season and playoffs ===
			Regular season					Playoffs
Season	Team	League	GP	G	A	Pts	PIM	GP	G	A	Pts	PIM
1969–70	St. Jerome Alouettes	QMJHL	45	35	33	68	43	13	6	12	18	2
1970–71	St. Jerome Alouettes	QMJHL	32	20	21	41	35	—	—	—	—	—
1970–71	Quebec Remparts	QMJHL	18	4	14	18	8	14	8	7	15	28
1971–72	Quebec Remparts	QMJHL	46	43	39	82	49	15	13	18	31	14
1972–73	Quebec Remparts	QMJHL	62	68	75	143	79	15	16	22	38	49
1973–74	Quebec Remparts	QMJHL	63	99	107	206	87	16	18	33	51	35
1974–75	Hampton Gulls	SHL	15	15	6	21	12	13	4	9	13	35
1974–75	Michigan Stags/Baltimore Blades	WHA	12	1	4	5	4	—	—	—	—	—
1974–75	Indianapolis Racers	WHA	11	0	1	1	2	—	—	—	—	—
1975–76	Cincinnati Stingers	WHA	80	27	46	73	70	—	—	—	—	—
1976–77	Cincinnati Stingers	WHA	45	18	13	31	27	—	—	—	—	—
1976–77	Calgary Cowboys	WHA	22	3	4	7	2	—	—	—	—	—
1977–78	Cincinnati Stingers	WHA	17	0	2	2	6	—	—	—	—	—
1977–78	Springfield Indians	AHL	21	3	3	6	29	—	—	—	—	—
WHA totals			187	49	70	119	111	—	—	—	—	—
