= Fayetteville Arsenal =

Coordinates: 35.053985°N 78.894672°W

- North Carolina Arsenal Site
- U.S. National Register of Historic Places
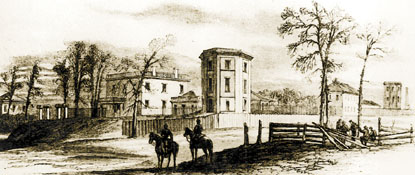
- The Fayetteville Arsenal in 1855

- Location within North Carolina
- Nearest city: Fayetteville, North Carolina
- Area: 89 acres (36 ha)
- Built: 1839
- NRHP reference No.: 83001865
- Added to NRHP: February 23, 1983

The Fayetteville Arsenal is a ruined Confederate States arsenal in Fayetteville, North Carolina. It housed numerous red brick and stone structures and octagonal corner guard towers. The principal armament manufactured at the arsenal was known as the "Fayetteville Rifle."

== Background ==
During the War of 1812 the United States government realized that the existing distribution of weapons and ammunition factories was not adequate for the defense of the country. A program was begun to provide more Federal arsenals which would be distributed so that no area of the country would be too far away from an arms depot. Bladen County Representative James McKay introduced House Resolution No. 374 for inclusion of an arsenal at Fayetteville.

== Construction ==
The cornerstone for the Arsenal was laid April 9, 1838. It was constructed of brick and stone and at each of the four corners of its massive walls was an octagonal tower. Entry into the Arsenal was controlled by use of massive iron gates. Workshops, quarters and other buildings in the Arsenal were constructed of brick and wood. The hill upon which the arsenal was construction was known as Haymount. The grounds of the arsenal were used as a park by locals.

== American Civil War ==
Even before North Carolina formally seceded from the Union, Governor Ellis commissioned Warren Winslow to bring about the peaceful, if possible, surrender of the Arsenal at Fayetteville. General Walker Draughon, then in command of the North Carolina Militia, was given the order to take possession of the Arsenal, then occupied by a Federal garrison consisting of Battery D, 2nd U.S. Artillery.

He mobilized the Fayetteville Independent Light Infantry (FILI) (the oldest private military organization in the State, having been organized in 1793) under the command of Major Wright Huske, and the LaFayette Light Infantry, commanded by Capt. Joseph B. Starr. Other troops were used as well, and the total number of troops present on April 22, 1861 was approximately 500.

After the Confederate troops had been inspected by the representative of the Federal forces, Lieutenant Julius de Lagnel, he decided that resistance was fruitless and surrendered the arsenal without incident. It was vacated by Federal forces on April 27, 1861.^{[1]} Major Wright Huske of the FILI "took up, in obedience to orders, its permanent quarters there for protection of important and valuable property." De Lagnel and the federal troops were permitted to leave with their small arms. De Lagnel subsequently sailed to New York, where he formally resigned his commission. The Confederates subsequently organized a battalion, known as the Armoury Guards, to garrison the arsenal.

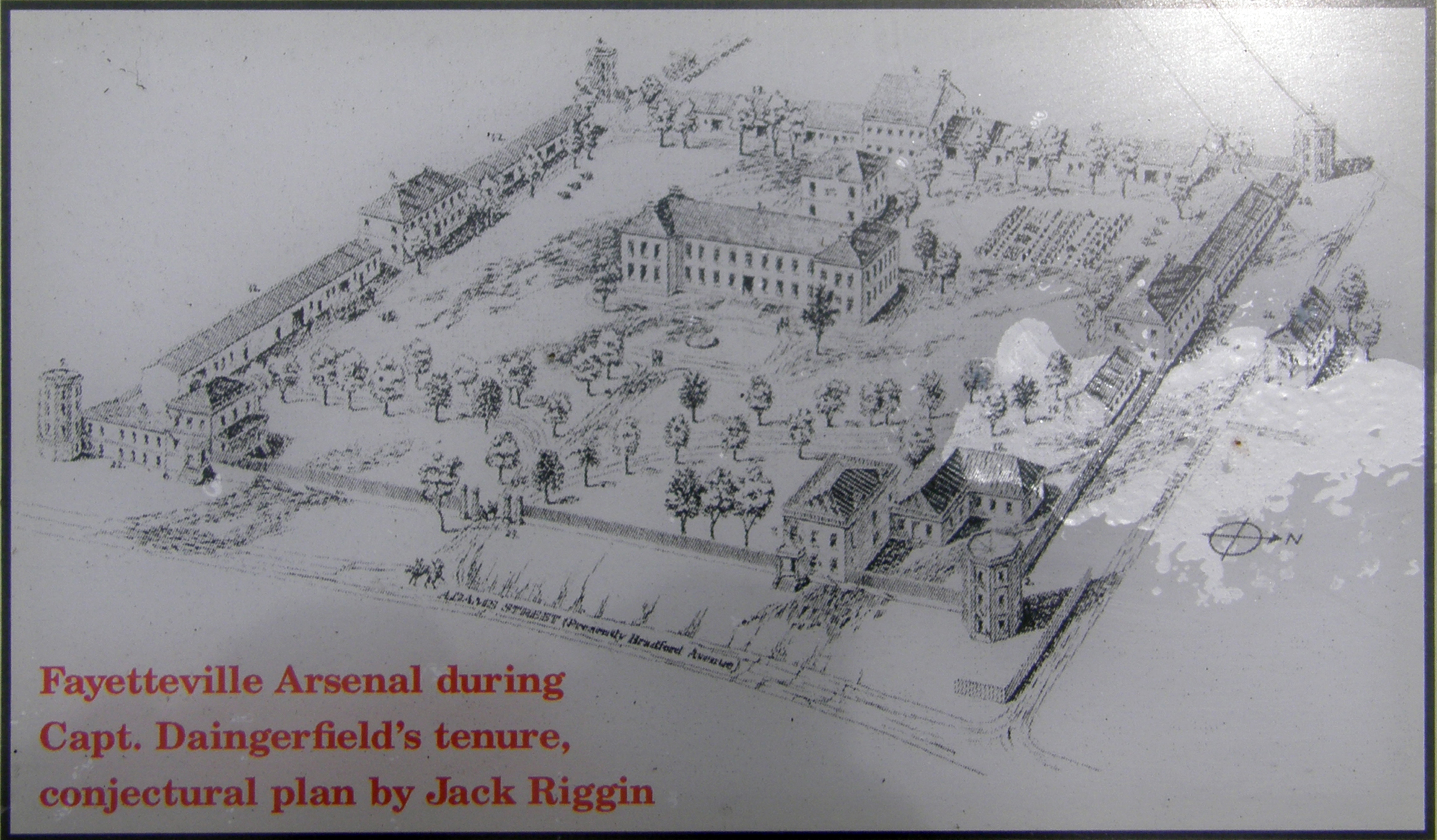
Layout of the Arsenal before Union General Sherman destroyed it in 1865

The Confederates obtained the 37,000 arms stored at the arsenal, though many were old flintlock models dating to the Revolutionary War. Workers were sought to modernize the guns, and in August, arsenal supervisor William Bell reported that he had 87 men laboring to rifle smoothbores, change flintlocks to percussion caps, and produce ammunition. The North Carolina General Assembly appropriated $200,000 towards the manufacture of arms at the captured arsenal, though such work did not begin until the autumn of 1861. Equipment for manufacturing the M1841 Mississippi rifle taken from the burned Harpers Ferry Armory in Virginia was installed, though it took several months to press into full use due to some missing parts and a lack of skilled workers.

The principal armament was known as the Fayetteville Rifle. At its peak, the arsenal produced 500 rifles per month and various numbers of other larger ordnance, cartridges, swords, and bayonets. Over one hundred workmen from the Harpers Ferry Arsenal had relocated with their families to Fayetteville. In the middle years of the war, young ladies of the area were employed in the making of cartridges and as clerks.

In 1865, as Union Major General William T. Sherman led his forces on the Carolinas campaign it became apparent to the Confederate commander, Colonel Childs, that Fayetteville was a major target. When Sherman reached Columbia, South Carolina, Col. Childs ordered the construction of earthworks for the defense of the Fayetteville area. Remnants of these earthworks can be seen on the grounds of the Veterans Administration Hospital on Ramsey Street.

Resistance was given but the battered and weary Confederate forces were overwhelmed by the tremendous numbers and firepower of the Union troops. Sherman entered Fayetteville on March 11, 1865, and took possession of the Arsenal, using it as his headquarters. The facility had been stripped of its arms, munitions, and useful machinery by the retreating Confederates. The Harpers Ferry rifle manufacturing machinery was said to have been hidden in the Egypt coal mines. Continuing his scorched earth policy, Sherman ordered the Arsenal razed to the ground. His soldiers used railroad rails as battering rams to knock the building down then set the remains on fire. As the fire raged, some remaining artillery shells exploded and completed the devastation.

== Ruins ==
Very little remains at the actual site today due to the construction of a central business district loop road through the area in 1988. There is one remaining partial frame outbuilding and a historical marker, and other remnants of the U.S. Arsenal are on display at the Museum of the Cape Fear Historical Complex. The foundations of the buildings that were located along the back wall of the arsenal, including the foundations of two of the towers, can be seen in the park located behind the Museum of the Cape Fear.

The Arsenal site was listed on the National Register of Historic Places in 1983.

== Notes ==
It is noteworthy that both Federal officers present with Battery D, Captain Samuel Anderson and Lieutenant Julius de Lagnel, resigned their commissions and joined the armed forces of the Confederate States of America in April and May 1861, respectively.

== Works cited ==
- Barrett, John G. (1963). The Civil War in North Carolina. Chapel Hill: The University of North Carolina Press. ISBN 0-8078-0874-1.
- Clark, Walter, ed. (1901). Histories of the Several Regiments and Battalions from North Carolina, in the Great War 1861-'65. Vol. IV. Goldsboro: Nash Brothers, Book and Job Printers.
- Media related to Fayetteville Arsenal at Wikimedia Commons
