= Pat Donnelly (ice hockey, born 1953) =

American ice hockey player

- Born: February 24, 1953 (age 73) Detroit, MI, USA
- Height: 5 ft 10 in (178 cm)
- Weight: 175 lb (79 kg; 12 st 7 lb)
- Position: Centre
- Shot: Right
- Played for: WHA; Cincinnati Stingers
- Playing career: 1973–1979

Pat Donnelly (born February 24, 1953) is an American former professional ice hockey player.

During the 1975–76 season, Donnelly played 23 games in the World Hockey Association with the Cincinnati Stingers.

As a youth, he played in the 1965 Quebec International Pee-Wee Hockey Tournament with the Detroit Roostertail minor ice hockey team.

== Career statistics ==
=== Regular season and playoffs ===
			Regular season					Playoffs
Season	Team	League	GP	G	A	Pts	PIM	GP	G	A	Pts	PIM
1970–71	Detroit Junior Red Wings	SOJHL	39	39	45	84	0	—	—	—	—	—
1972–73	Detroit Junior Red Wings	SOJHL	Statistics Unavailable
1973–74	Long Island Cougars	NAHL	47	19	33	52	21	—	—	—	—	—
1974–75	Hampton Gulls	SHL	58	33	37	70	45	13	5	12	17	2
1975–76	Cincinnati Stingers	WHA	23	5	7	12	4	—	—	—	—	—
1975–76	Hampton Gulls	SHL	47	28	39	67	35	8	4	6	10	0
1976–77	Hampton Gulls	SHL	46	23	24	47	10	—	—	—	—	—
1977–78	Hampton Gulls	AHL	46	12	21	33	2	—	—	—	—	—
1977–78	San Francisco Shamrocks	PHL	19	13	11	24	4	—	—	—	—	—
1978–79	San Francisco Shamrocks	PHL	17	3	7	10	20	—	—	—	—	—
1978–79	Jersey/Hampton Aces	NEHL	24	15	8	23	2	—	—	—	—	—
WHA totals			23	5	7	12	4	—	—	—	—	—
