= Claude Chartre =

Canadian ice hockey player

- Born: December 21, 1949 (age 76) Grande-Rivière, Quebec, Canada
- Height: 6 ft 0 in (183 cm)
- Weight: 176 lb (80 kg; 12 st 8 lb)
- Position: Centre
- Shot: Left
- Played for: New York Raiders; New York Golden Blades; Jersey Knights; Michigan Stags; Baltimore Blades
- NHL draft: 81st overall, 1969; Philadelphia Flyers
- Playing career: 1969–1978

Claude Chartre (born December 21, 1949) is a Canadian retired professional ice hockey centre. He played in 18 WHA games with the New York Raiders, New York Golden Blades, Jersey Knights, Michigan Stags, and Baltimore Blades over parts of three seasons.

== Career statistics ==
=== Regular season and playoffs ===
			Regular season					Playoffs
Season	Team	League	GP	G	A	Pts	PIM	GP	G	A	Pts	PIM
1965–66	West Island Flyers	MMJHL	20	0	5	5	0	--	--	--	--	--
1967–68	Thetford Mines Canadiens	QJAHL	50	33	22	55	36	--	--	--	--	--
1969–70	Quebec Aces	AHL	30	2	4	6	2	--	--	--	--	--
1969–70	Jersey Devils	EHL	23	19	4	23	8	--	--	--	--	--
1970–71	Jersey Devils	EHL	74	52	38	90	41	--	--	--	--	--
1971–72	Jersey Devils	EHL	75	40	32	72	44	--	--	--	--	--
1972–73	Long Island Ducks	EHL	52	34	40	74	23	4	3	3	6	2
1972–73	New York Raiders	WHA	12	2	3	5	0	--	--	--	--	--
1973–74	Syracuse Blazers	NAHL	47	43	43	86	35	15	11	11	22	0
1973–74	New York Golden Blades/Jersey Knights	WHA	5	0	0	0	0	--	--	--	--	--
1974–75	Hampton Gulls	SHL	71	33	79	112	20	13	3	9	12	0
1974–75	Michigan Stags/Baltimore Blades	WHA	1	0	0	0	0	--	--	--	--	--
1975–76	Hampton Gulls	SHL	41	13	13	26	2	9	0	4	4	2
1976–77	Hampton Gulls	SHL	49	20	38	58	22	--	--	--	--	--
1977–78	San Diego Mariners	PHL	16	9	9	18	4	--	--	--	--	--
1977–78	Hampton Gulls	AHL	26	2	6	8	12	--	--	--	--	--
WHA totals			18	2	3	5	0	—	—	—	—	—
