= 1975–76 Southern Hockey League season =

Southern Hockey League
Southern Hockey League teams, 1975–1976.
Active teams Former teams

The 1975–76 Southern Hockey League season was the third season of the Southern Hockey League. The five existing teams returned from the previous season, joined by a sixth expansion team from Norfolk, Virginia. The Tidewater Sharks joined the league owned by Virginia politician Dick Davis, playing at the Norfolk Scope. The six teams played a complete schedule of 72 games, with the Charlotte Checkers winning the regular season, and the playoffs.

== Standings ==
Final standings of the regular season.

	GP	W	L	T	GF	GA	Pts
Charlotte Checkers	72	42	20	10	302	206	94
Hampton Gulls	72	33	23	16	262	234	82
Winston-Salem Polar Twins	72	30	29	13	252	251	73
Roanoke Valley Rebels	72	29	28	15	239	238	73
Tidewater Sharks	72	24	34	14	230	260	62
Greensboro Generals	72	18	42	12	221	317	48

== WHA/NHL affiliations ==
Southern Hockey League franchises were primarily affiliated with World Hockey Association teams, however some also had agreements with National Hockey League teams. Summary of WHA/NHL affiliation agreements:

SHL team	WHA parent clubs	NHL parent clubs
Charlotte Checkers	Calgary Cowboys	Buffalo Sabres
Greensboro Generals	none	Detroit Red Wings; Washington Capitals
Hampton Gulls	Cincinnati Stingers	none
Roanoke Valley Rebels	Winnipeg Jets; Calgary Cowboys; San Diego Mariners	none
Tidewater Sharks	Cleveland Crusaders	Buffalo Sabres
Winston-Salem Polar Twins	none	New York Rangers); St. Louis Blues

== Scoring leaders ==
Top 10 SHL points scoring leaders.

Rank	Player	Team	Goals	Assists	Points
1	John Campbell	Winston-Salem	33	59	92
2	Yvon Dupuis	Charlotte	52	39	91
3	Ken Gassoff	Winston-Salem	36	49	85
4	Wally Sprange	Greensboro	22	59	81
5	Art Stratton	Hampton	14	64	78
6	Neil Korzack	Charlotte	46	31	77
7	John Raynak	Roanoke Valley	35	40	75
8	Bob Smulders	Charlotte	22	46	68
9	Pat Donnelly	Hampton	28	39	67
10	Wayne Chrysler	Charlotte	24	42	66

== Playoffs ==
James Crockett Cup playoffs.

Semifinals
1	Charlotte Checkers	4
4	Roanoke Valley Rebels	2
2	Hampton Gulls	4
3	Winston-Salem Polar Twins	0

Final
1	Charlotte Checkers	4
2	Hampton Gulls	1
