= Ron Morgan =

Canadian ice hockey player

- Born: May 25, 1951 (age 74) Toronto, Ontario, Canada
- Height: 5 ft 11 in (180 cm)
- Weight: 190 lb (86 kg; 13 st 8 lb)
- Position: Left wing
- Shot: Left
- Played for: Cleveland Crusaders (WHA)
- NHL draft: Undrafted
- Playing career: 1972–1977

Ron Morgan (born May 25, 1951) is a Canadian former professional ice hockey player.

During the 1973–74 season, Morgan played four games in the World Hockey Association with the Cleveland Crusaders.

== Career statistics ==
=== Regular season and playoffs ===
			Regular season					Playoffs
Season	Team	League	GP	G	A	Pts	PIM	GP	G	A	Pts	PIM
1969–70	Whitby Steelers	MJBHL	Statistics Unavailable
1970–71	Richmond Hill Rams	MJBHL	Statistics Unavailable
1972–73	Syracuse Blazers	EHL	72	53	42	95	176	14	5	12	17	25
1973–74	Jacksonville Barons	AHL	16	2	2	4	7	—	—	—	—	—
1973–74	Cleveland Crusaders	WHA	4	0	1	1	7	2	1	0	1	0
1973–74	Macon Whoopees	SHL	51	25	27	52	101	—	—	—	—	—
1974–75	Syracuse Eagles	AHL	4	0	0	0	0	—	—	—	—	—
1974–75	Hampton Gulls	SHL	28	4	12	16	54	—	—	—	—	—
1975–76	Hampton Gulls	SHL	67	29	28	57	64	9	3	1	4	5
1976–77	Mohawk Valley Comets	NAHL	20	8	7	15	16	5	2	1	3	4
1976–77	Hampton Gulls	SHL	50	21	31	52	19	—	—	—	—	—
WHA totals			4	0	1	1	7	2	1	0	1	0
