= 1976–77 Southern Hockey League season =

Southern Hockey League
Southern Hockey League teams, 1976–1977.
Active teams Former teams

The 1976–77 Southern Hockey League season was the fourth and final season of the Southern Hockey League. The Roanoke Valley Rebels ceased operations, and two new teams were added for the season. The Baltimore Clippers transferred from the American Hockey League, and the Richmond Wildcats were an expansion team. Both the Richmond Wildcats and Greensboro Generals folded on January 3, 1977, due to financial problems. On January 7, the Tidewater Sharks folded after missing payroll, and the Winston-Salem Polar Twins pulled out of the league. The remaining three teams considered adding a fourth team, but the league was short on funds when Greensboro and Winston-Salem defaulted on $25,000 loans. The league also considered playing a round-robin tournament to determine a champion, or develop an interlocking schedule with either the North American Hockey League or the International Hockey League. On January 22, 1977, both the NAHL and IHL rejected the proposal, and the final game was played on January 31, 1977, although the league planned on playing a 1977–78 season.

== Standings ==
Final standings of the regular season.

	GP	W	L	T	GF	GA	Pts
Hampton Gulls	50	32	16	2	198	152	66
Tidewater Sharks	41	26	13	2	158	131	54
Charlotte Checkers	50	22	25	3	180	186	47
Baltimore Clippers	47	21	24	2	182	169	44
Richmond Wildcats	38	21	16	1	160	144	43
Greensboro Generals	40	15	24	1	140	173	31
Winston-Salem Polar Twins	42	11	30	1	130	193	23

== WHA/NHL affiliations ==
Southern Hockey League franchises were primarily affiliated with World Hockey Association teams, however some also had agreements with National Hockey League teams. Summary of WHA/NHL affiliation agreements:

SHL team	WHA parent clubs	NHL parent clubs
Baltimore Clippers	Edmonton Oilers	none
Charlotte Checkers	Birmingham Bulls; Winnipeg Jets	Buffalo Sabres
Greensboro Generals	none	Atlanta Flames; Cleveland Barons; Colorado Rockies
Hampton Gulls	Cincinnati Stingers; Minnesota Fighting Saints	none
Richmond Wildcats	none	New York Rangers; St. Louis Blues
Tidewater Sharks	Calgary Cowboys	none
Winston-Salem Polar Twins	none	New York Rangers

== Scoring leaders ==
Top 10 SHL points scoring leaders.

Rank	Player	Team	Goals	Assists	Points
1	Don Grierson	Baltimore	30	45	75
2	Claude Chartre	Hampton	20	38	58
3	Paul O'Neil	Hampton	21	34	55
4	Jack Surbey	Charlotte	21	32	53
5	Ted Long	Hampton	16	36	52
5	Ron Morgan	Hampton	21	31	52
7	Cam Colborne	Greensboro/Charlotte	14	34	48
7	Dan Djakalovic	Hampton	18	30	48
9	Pat Donnelly	Hampton	23	24	47
9	Ken Gassoff	Winston-Salem	16	31	47
