= Southern Hockey League (1973–1977) =

American minor level ice hockey league

- Founded: 1973
- Folded: 1977
- Replaced by: Eastern Hockey League
- Commissioner: Tedd Munchak (1974–75); Jack Riley (1975–77)
- No. of teams: 5 to 7
- Country: United States
- Most titles: Charlotte Checkers (2)

The Southern Hockey League was a low-level minor professional ice hockey league that operated from 1973 to 1977. The league was formed when the Eastern Hockey League split in two; the southern teams became the Southern Hockey League, and the northern teams became the North American Hockey League. It was the first professional hockey league to operate wholly within the Southern United States, and followed the establishment of the Atlanta Flames in the National Hockey League; and also the Richmond Robins and the Tidewater Wings in the American Hockey League. The Southern Hockey League was a feeder league for the recently started World Hockey Association. Tedd Munchak was appointed the league's first commissioner, and was owner of the Greensboro Generals. The championship trophy of the league was named the James Crockett Cup, after local figure Jim Crockett Sr. The league disbanded during its fourth season, when four of its seven teams folded due to financial issues.

== History ==
=== Origins ===
In May 1973, the four teams in the Eastern Hockey League (EHL)'s Southern Division–the Charlotte Checkers, Greensboro Generals, Roanoke Valley Rebels, and Suncoast Suns–all left the EHL to form the Southern Hockey League. For some time, the EHL's southern teams had felt chagrin at the costs of traveling to northern arenas, and other regulations such as dressing only 14 players for games. The four charter members were joined by two expansion teams, the Macon Whoopees and Winston-Salem Polar Twins. The SHL established itself as a fully professional league; the EHL was nominally an amateur league, but players were known to be paid for playing. It became a development league for the year-old World Hockey Association (WHA). The affiliation with the WHA brought the promise of better players, but drawbacks included not finalizing rosters until just before the season started, and mid-season callups straining the talent pool.

=== 1973-74 season ===
Six teams began the 1973–74 Southern Hockey League season, but two did not complete the schedule due to financial trouble. The Suncoast Suns folded on December 19, 1973. The Macon Whoopees forfeited a game against Charlotte on January 17, 1974, when players refused to play because of not being paid. The team eventually folded on February 15, 1974. The remaining four teams made the playoffs, with the Roanoke Valley Rebels finishing as champions. On July 31, 1975, Jack Riley was announced as the new commissioner of the SHL, taking over for interim leader Gene Hawthorne, of the Roanoke Valley Rebels.

=== 1974-75 season ===
The four existing teams returned for the 1974–75 Southern Hockey League season, joined by a fifth expansion team from Fayetteville, North Carolina. The new team was named after the Fayetteville Arsenal, and was scheduled to play at the Cumberland County Memorial Arena. In October 1974, owner Bill Raue moved the team, to Hampton, Virginia, before playing any games, when availability of home ice dates became a problem. The new Hampton Gulls relocated to the Hampton Coliseum, recently vacated by the Virginia Wings of the American Hockey League. The five teams played a complete schedule of 72 games, with the Charlotte Checkers winning both the regular season and playoff titles.

=== 1975-76 season ===
The five existing teams returned for the 1975–76 Southern Hockey League season, joined by a sixth expansion team from Norfolk, Virginia. The Tidewater Sharks joined the league owned by Virginia politician Dick Davis, playing at the Norfolk Scope. The six teams played a complete schedule of 72 games, with the Charlotte Checkers repeating as regular season and playoff champions. The Checkers' owners pulled out despite winning the title, but local car dealer Gar Laux stepped in to take over the team.

=== Collapse ===
The Roanoke Valley Rebels ceased operations, and two new teams were added for the 1976–77 Southern Hockey League season. The Baltimore Clippers transferred from the American Hockey League, and the Richmond Wildcats were an expansion team.

Both Richmond and Greensboro folded on January 3, 1977, due to financial problems. On January 7, the Tidewater Sharks, tied with Hampton for the league's best record, folded after missing payroll. Winston-Salem owner Jim Crockett Jr. pulled the Polar Twins out of the league shortly after Tidewater collapsed. Earlier, Crockett had expressed concerns that fans would not consider a five-time league to be credible. With the Sharks' collapse, Crockett concluded there was no longer a league and shuttered his franchise.

The remaining three teams-the Clippers, Checkers, and Gulls-considered playing a round-robin tournament to determine a champion, or develop an interlocking schedule with either the NAHL or the higher-level International Hockey League. They played among themselves for two weeks while awaiting an answer from the NAHL and IHL. On January 22, 1977, both the NAHL and IHL rejected the proposal. Realizing they could not finish the season with three teams, Riley and the remaining three owners considered using the letters of credit from three of the four shuttered franchises to finance a fourth team, with Riley suggesting Roanoke as a site. Ultimately, they concluded the losses were too great to justify a league-operated team. The SHL played what would be its last game on January 31, 1977. However, there was talk of returning for the 1977-78 season. By late March 1977, Riley publicly claimed that he couldn't see the SHL returning for the following season. By May, according to Checkers owner Laux, there was no chance of reviving the SHL. Laux told The Charlotte Observer that he was willing to ice a team, but "there's no league for us to join, and it's too late to do anything." The league still nominally existed, but according to Laux, a planned April meeting with the other two owners had been canceled. Laux added that he had no interest in returning to the SHL "as it was the past two years."

The Gulls were the only SHL team to take the ice in any form for the 1977-78 season, switching to the AHL. However, they only lasted 46 games into the season before folding in February 1978.

== Teams ==
Southern Hockey League (1973–77)
Southern Hockey League teams, 1973–1977.
Original teams Expansion teams Never active

The Southern Hockey League started with teams in Virginia, North Carolina and Florida. Winston-Salem was added next, owned by a group of 15 investors. The league sought out a sixth team in southern states to fill in the gap between North Carolina and Florida. Westward expansion was ruled out, as Tennessee teams were already in the Central Professional Hockey League, and hockey in Louisville, Kentucky, ended in 1960. South Carolina did not have a suitable facility, nor did it get a professional hockey team until 1993. Alabama also did not have a suitable arena, and hockey first arrived there with the Birmingham Bulls in 1976. This left Georgia, and the city of Macon being targeted because it had a suitable arena that was adjacent to Interstate 75; and Macon previously had hockey a temporary hockey team in 1968. The SHL also hoped to build upon the Atlanta Flames arriving in 1972. Commissioner Tedd Munchak, wanted a sixth team desperately enough that he put up the $25,000 expansion fee himself for the Macon team. With the loss of its two southernmost teams after the first season, the league was based solely in North Carolina and Virginia, until the addition of a Maryland team in 1976.

Teams of the Southern Hockey League listed by founding date.

Team name	Years	Seasons	City	Arena
Charlotte Checkers	1973–1977	4	Charlotte, North Carolina	Charlotte Coliseum
Greensboro Generals	1973–1977	4	Greensboro, North Carolina	Greensboro Coliseum Complex
Macon Whoopees	1973–1974	1	Macon, Georgia	Macon Coliseum
Roanoke Valley Rebels	1973–1976	3	Roanoke, Virginia	Roanoke Civic Center
Suncoast Suns	1973–1974	1	St. Petersburg, Florida	Bayfront Center
Winston-Salem Polar Twins	1973–1977	4	Winston-Salem, North Carolina	Winston-Salem Memorial Coliseum
Fayetteville Arsenal	1974	0	Fayetteville, North Carolina	Cumberland County Memorial Arena
Hampton Gulls	1974–1977	3	Hampton, Virginia	Hampton Coliseum
Tidewater Sharks	1975–1977	2	Norfolk, Virginia	Norfolk Scope
Baltimore Clippers	1976–1977	1	Baltimore, Maryland	Baltimore Civic Center
Richmond Wildcats	1976–1977	1	Richmond, Virginia	Richmond Coliseum

== Seasons ==
The Southern Hockey League played four seasons. Each season was scheduled with 72 games for each of five to seven teams at the beginning of the season. The Charlotte Checkers appeared in all three Crockett Cup finals, winning two. Regular season and postseason results of the Southern Hockey League:

Season	Teams	Regular season champion	James Crocket Cup champion
1973–74	6	Roanoke Valley Rebels	Roanoke Valley Rebels
1974–75	5	Charlotte Checkers	Charlotte Checkers
1975–76	6	Charlotte Checkers	Charlotte Checkers
1976–77	7	Hampton Gulls †	League folded January 31st

† First place team on January 31st, when league folded.

== WHA/NHL affiliations ==
Southern Hockey League franchises were primarily affiliated with World Hockey Association teams, however some also had agreements with National Hockey League teams. Summary of WHA/NHL affiliation agreements:

SHL team	WHA parent clubs (seasons)	NHL parent clubs (seasons)
Baltimore Clippers	Edmonton Oilers (1976–77)	none
Charlotte Checkers	Vancouver Blazers (1974–75); Calgary Cowboys (1975–76); Birmingham Bulls (1976–77); Winnipeg Jets (1976–77)	Buffalo Sabres (1973–77); California Golden Seals (1974–75)
Greensboro Generals	Los Angeles Sharks (1973–74); Michigan Stags/Baltimore Blades (1974–75)	New York Islanders (1974–75); Detroit Red Wings (1975–76); Washington Capitals (1975–76); Atlanta Flames (1976–77); Cleveland Barons (1976–77); Colorado Rockies (1976–77)
Hampton Gulls	Cincinnati Stingers (1974–77); Minnesota Fighting Saints (1976–77)	none
Macon Whoopees	Houston Aeros (1973–74); Cleveland Crusaders (1973–74)	none
Richmond Wildcats	none	New York Rangers (1976–77); St. Louis Blues (1976–77)
Roanoke Valley Rebels	Vancouver Blazers (1973–74); Houston Aeros (1974–75); Winnipeg Jets (1974–76); Calgary Cowboys (1975–76); San Diego Mariners (1975–76)	none
Suncoast Suns	Minnesota Fighting Saints (1973); New England Whalers (1973)	none
Tidewater Sharks	Cleveland Crusaders (1975–76); Calgary Cowboys (1976–77)	Buffalo Sabres (1975–76)
Winston-Salem Polar Twins	Edmonton Oilers (1973–74); New York Golden Blades/Jersey Knights (1973–74)	New York Rangers (1974–77); Detroit Red Wings (1974–75); St. Louis Blues (1975–76)
