= Cincinnati Stingers =

Former ice hockey team of the World Hockey Association

- City: Cincinnati, Ohio
- League: World Hockey Association
- Operated: 1975–1979
- Home arena: Riverfront Coliseum
- Colors: Black, gold
- Media: WXIX-TV; WKRC

The Cincinnati Stingers were an ice hockey team based in Cincinnati that played in the World Hockey Association from 1975 to 1979 and in the Central Hockey League during the 1979–80 season. Their home arena was Riverfront Coliseum. They are the only major league hockey team to have played in Cincinnati.

== History ==
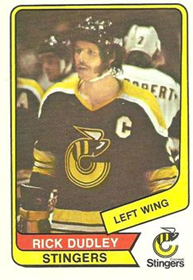
Rick Dudley is the all-time leading scorer of the Stingers

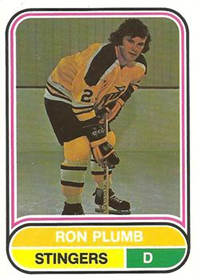
1975-76 card of Ron Plumb.

The Stingers franchise was awarded in 1974 as part of the WHA's ill-conceived attempt at expansion. They entered the league for the 1975–76 WHA season along with the Denver Spurs, playing almost immediately after the Cincinnati Reds had won the 1975 World Series.

Most of the league's existing teams were not financially stable, and franchise relocations were commonplace. The Stingers achieved enough stability that they were the only one of the WHA's five expansion teams that lasted through to the end of the league, but they were left out of the NHL–WHA merger in mid-1979. The WHA insisted on including all three of its surviving Canadian teams, though below-average attendance made it unlikely that the Stingers would have made the cut. The Stingers, along with the Birmingham Bulls, were paid to disband when the WHA ceased operations. With the NHL's Cleveland Barons merging with the Minnesota North Stars the previous year, Ohio would be left without a major professional hockey team until the Columbus Blue Jackets started play in 2000.

The Stingers were the first professional team of long-time NHL stars Mike Gartner and Mike Liut, and the second pro team for Mark Messier, who scored one goal on a line with Robbie Ftorek, one of the league's top scorers. In their four seasons, Rick Dudley scored the most goals (131) and recorded the most points (277) in franchise history while Robbie Ftorek set season records for goals (59, 1977–78) and points (116, 1978–79).

After the WHA shut down, a minor professional version of the Cincinnati Stingers began the 1979–80 season in the Central Hockey League (CHL). The CHL team included only three players from the 1978–79 WHA Stingers; Dave Debol, Byron Shutt and Paul Stewart, but disbanded 33 games into the season.

The last Cincinnati Stingers player active in North American major professional hockey was Mark Messier, who retired in 2004.

== Hockey Hall of Fame members ==
- Mike Gartner
- Mark Messier

== Season-by-season record ==
Note: GP = Games played, W = Wins, L = Losses, T = Ties, Pts = Points, GF = Goals for, GA = Goals against, PIM = Penalties in minutes

World Hockey Association

Season	GP	W	L	T	Pts	GF	GA	PIM	Finish	Playoffs
1975–76	80	35	44	1	71	285	340	1344	4th, Eastern	Did not qualify
1976–77	81	39	37	5	83	354	303	970	2nd, Eastern	Lost Quarterfinals vs. Indianapolis Racers, 0–4
1977–78	80	35	42	3	73	298	332	1701	7th, WHA	Did not qualify
1978–79	80	33	41	6	72	274	284	1651	5th, WHA	Lost Quarterfinals vs. New England Whalers, 1–2
Totals	321	142	164	15	299	1211	1259	5666

Central Hockey League

Season	GP	W	L	T	Pts	GF	GA	PIM	Finish	Playoffs
1979–80	33	11	21	1	23	108	151	591	n/a	Incomplete season

== See also ==
- List of Cincinnati Stingers players
