= Red Storey =

Canadian athlete, referee, broadcaster (1918–2006)

- Born: Roy Alvin Storey; March 5, 1918; Barrie, Ontario, Canada
- Died: March 15, 2006 (aged 88); Montreal, Quebec, Canada
- Occupation: Ice hockey referee
- Years active: 1950–1959
- Employer: National Hockey League
Ice hockey career
- Hockey Hall of Fame, 1967 (Official)
- Height: 6 ft 3 in (191 cm)
- Position: Defense
- Played for: Atlantic City Seagulls; River Vale Skeeters
- Playing career: 1939–1942
- Football career

No. 64 – Toronto Argonauts
- Position: HB/FW
- Roster status: Retired

Career information
- High school: Barrie Central Collegiate Institute

Career history

Playing
- 1936–1941: Toronto Argonauts

official
- 1942–1957: IRFU official

Awards and highlights
- 2× Grey Cup champion (1937, 1938); IRFU All-Star (1939)

Roy Alvin "Red" Storey CM (March 5, 1918 – March 15, 2006) was a Canadian athlete, referee and broadcaster. He played football, lacrosse and ice hockey. While active as an athlete, he turned to officiating in all three sports, and continued as an official after the end of his playing career. While he was a member of the Toronto Argonauts, the team won the Grey Cup championship twice. He refereed in the National Hockey League (NHL), and later became a radio and television commentator for Canadian television.

== Early life and career ==
Born in Barrie, Ontario, Storey was working in a rail yard when he received an offer to play football with the Toronto Argonauts. He was on the team for six seasons from 1936 to 1941, winning the Grey Cup in 1937 and 1938. During the 1938 Grey Cup game, Storey scored three touchdowns in twelve minutes versus Winnipeg, all in the fourth quarter, to give the Argos the victory. After his performance, he received offers from the New York Giants and the Chicago Bears of the National Football League but declined to leave Canada. He was forced to retire after suffering a knee injury.

At the same time he was playing football, Storey was also playing competitive lacrosse. In the Ontario Lacrosse Association, he played for Orillia and was an all-star with the Hamilton Tigers in 1941.

Storey was also a prominent senior men's baseball player and received an offer from the Philadelphia Athletics of the American League.

As a defenceman, he played hockey in New Jersey for the River Vale Skeeters in 1941. Storey then moved to Montreal and joined the Montreal Royals late in the 1941–42 season.

He played lacrosse for Lachine in 1942 and 1943. He later joined the Montreal Canadiens lacrosse team, and was playing there in 1946.

By the mid-1940s, Storey—in addition to his regular job—was officiating football, lacrosse, and hockey games. He officiated Big Four football for 12 years (precursor to the Canadian Football League.)

== NHL refereeing career ==
Storey became an NHL referee in 1950 and worked in the league until 1959. On April 4, 1959, he was officiating Game 6 of the Stanley Cup semifinal between the Montreal Canadiens and the Chicago Black Hawks, which Montreal won, along with the series, scoring the winning goal with 88 seconds left in the sixth game. Chicago fans nearly rioted, and Black Hawks coach Rudy Pilous accused Storey of choking by not calling penalties against the Canadiens late in the game. Storey was scheduled to referee the final game in the series between the Toronto Maple Leafs and the Boston Bruins, but when Ottawa Journal sports editor Bill Westwick reported that NHL president Clarence Campbell said that Storey had "frozen" on two calls that should have been penalties against the Canadiens, Storey immediately resigned. He never returned to the NHL. His career included 480 regular season games and seven consecutive Stanley Cup finals from 1952 through 1958.

He was popular with NHL players because he talked with them. Gump Worsley said of Storey in his autobiography They Call Me Gump: "When Red Storey was refereeing in the NHL, I used to ask him where he was going to get a beer after the game. He usually told me, too."

== Following retirement ==
Following his retirement from the NHL, Storey remained active in oldtimers' games, worked as a TV commentator, and was a popular raconteur.

Storey was inducted into the Hockey Hall of Fame (1967) and Canada's Sports Hall of Fame (1986) and was made a Member of the Order of Canada in 1991. He was also inducted into the Ontario Sports Hall of Fame in 2001. He was 88 when he died in Montreal after a lengthy illness.

His son, Bob Storey, was also a two-time Grey Cup winner (1967, 1970).

== Honours ==
- The athletic field at the former Barrie Central Collegiate Institute, where Storey is a graduate, was named in his honour.
- He was inducted into the Barrie Sports Hall of Fame in 1985.
- He was inducted into Canada’s Sports Hall of Fame in 1986.
- He was appointed as a Member of the Order of Canada (CM) in 1992.
- He was awarded the 125th Anniversary of the Confederation of Canada Medal in 1992.
- He was awarded the Canadian Version of the Queen Elizabeth II Golden Jubilee Medal in 2002.
- He was inducted into the Ontario Sports Hall of Fame in 2001.

== Hockey career statistics ==
			Regular season					Playoffs
Season	Team	League	GP	G	A	Pts	PIM	GP	G	A	Pts	PIM
1939–40	Atlantic City Seagulls	EHL	50	6	7	13	69	—	—	—	—	—
1941–42	River Vale Skeeters	EHL	27	3	3	6	39	—	—	—	—	—
1942–43	Montreal Royals	QSHL	—	2	1	3	0	—	—	—	—	—
EHL totals			77	9	10	19	108	—	—	—	—	—

== See also ==
- List of members of the Hockey Hall of Fame
- List of NHL on-ice officials
