= Chuck Stuart (ice hockey) =

Canadian ice hockey player (1935–2004)

- Born: November 12, 1935; St. Catharines, Ontario, Canada
- Died: January 12, 2004 (aged 68); Charlotte, North Carolina, U.S.
- Height: 5 ft 9 in (175 cm)
- Weight: 180 lb (82 kg; 12 st 12 lb)
- Position: Center
- Shot: Left
- Played for: Johnstown Jets; Charlotte Clippers; Philadelphia Ramblers; Knoxville Knights; Charlotte Checkers
- Playing career: 1953–1969

Charles Edward Stuart (November 12, 1935 – January 12, 2004) was a Canadian professional hockey center.

== Career ==
Stuart played in the Eastern Hockey League for the Johnstown Jets, Charlotte Clippers, Philadelphia Ramblers, Knoxville Knights and Charlotte Checkers. He ranks second in the league's all-time scoring history with 1121 points. He also set a record in the 1962–63 season with 78 goals in 66 games.

== Death ==
Stuart died from cancer in Charlotte, North Carolina, on January 12, 2004, at the age of 68.
