= Baltimore Clippers (disambiguation) =

Baltimore Clippers could mean:

- Baltimore Clippers (basketball), a professional basketball team American Basketball League

Or several ice hockey teams:

- Baltimore Clippers (1945–1949), a team in the Eastern Amateur Hockey League, also known as the Baltimore Blades (1944–45)
- Baltimore Clippers (1954–1956), a team in the Eastern Hockey League, that became the Charlotte Clippers and then the Charlotte Checkers (1956–1977)
- Baltimore Clippers (1962–1977), a team in the American Hockey League, and later the Southern Hockey League
- Baltimore Clippers (1979–1981), a team in the Eastern Hockey League, team that became the Baltimore Skipjacks
- Baltimore Clippers Sr. A (2008–09), a senior hockey team in Baltimore, Ontario, Canada

== See also ==
- Baltimore Clipper, the colloquial name for fast sailing ships built on the mid-Atlantic seaboard of the United States
