= Bill Moe =

American ice hockey player

- Born: October 2, 1916 Danvers, Massachusetts, USA
- Died: July 13, 1996 (aged 79)
- Height: 5 ft 11 in (180 cm)
- Weight: 175 lb (79 kg; 12 st 7 lb)
- Position: Defense
- Shot: Left
- Played for: New York Rangers
- Playing career: 1939–1953

William Carl Moe (October 2, 1916 – July 13, 1996) was an American professional ice hockey defenseman who played five seasons for the New York Rangers of the National Hockey League (NHL) between 1944 and 1949. He also spent ten seasons in the Eastern Amateur Hockey League, the Pacific Coast Hockey League, and the American Hockey League from 1939 to 1953. During his NHL career he was one of only three Americans in the league. In his only NHL playoff game he fractured two vertebrae after throwing a check. He was inducted into the United States Hockey Hall of Fame in 1974. Moe was born in Danvers, Massachusetts, but grew up in Minneapolis, Minnesota.

== Playing career ==
Moe began his career playing for the Atlantic City Sea Gulls in the Eastern Amateur Hockey League (EAHL). After playing 34 games for the Gulls he was traded to the Baltimore Orioles in January 1940, for Ed Powers. He finished the season with 6 goals and 11 points between the two clubs. Moe played one more season with the Orioles, matching his goal production and increasing his points to 12. He then moved on to play with the Philadelphia Ramblers in the American Hockey League (AHL).

Moe "excelled" in the AHL and posted 24 points in his lone season in Philadelphia. Following season's end Moe changed teams again this time joining the AHL's Hershey Bears. Moe's production dipped in his first year with Hershey, but in his second he finished with his AHL career high 31 points. In the off-season he was named to the AHL First All-Star Team, and his rights were traded to the National Hockey League's New York Rangers. Moe made his NHL debut on November 26, 1944 against the Boston Bruins. He played 35 games for the Rangers in the 1944-45 season while also playing 12 games for the Bears. When Moe entered the NHL he became one of only three Americans playing in the league, Frank Brimsek and John Mariucci were the other two.

Midway through the following season Moe was accused of delivering an illegal low hit to the Chicago Black Hawks' Bill Mosienko which resulted in a torn knee ligament. Rangers' head coach, Frank Boucher, defended Moe by saying "Bill [Moe] stopped Mosienko with a fair bodycheck and bodychecking is part of a defenseman's job." Moe finished the season with four goals and eight points, as the Rangers finished last for the fourth straight year. He continued to improve, increasing his point total over the next two season first to 14 then to 16, and the Rangers made the playoffs for the first time in six seasons during the 1947–48 season. In his NHL playoff debut, on March 24, 1948 against the Detroit Red Wings, Moe fractured two vertebrae after throwing a check at Bill Quackenbush. It was the only NHL playoff game that he played in. Prior to the start of the next season Moe was involved in an automobile accident with four of his teammates, as they were retiring from exhibition games in Quebec. He suffered two scalp wounds, requiring 24 stitches to close, and a mild concussion. Despite the injuries, Moe played in a career best 60 games registering 9 assists along with an NHL career high 60 penalty minutes. During the off-season the Rangers traded Moe, along with the rights to Lorne Ferguson and future considerations to the Bruins for Pat Egan and cash. The Bruins acquired Moe to play for the Bears who were now their farm team.

Moe played two more seasons with the Bears, registering a total of 5 goals and 37 points. After his two seasons in Hershey, Moe moved to the Pacific Coast Hockey League playing for the Calgary Stampeders. He played only one season in Calgary before returning to the EAHL, finishing his career with the Troy Uncle Sam's Trojans. Moe retired at the end of the year and in his final professional season he recorded a career high 35 points. In 1974 Moe was inducted into the United States Hockey Hall of Fame.

== Career statistics ==
=== Regular season and playoffs ===
| | | | Regular season | | | | | Playoffs |
| Season | Team | League | GP | G | A | Pts | PIM | GP | G | A | Pts | PIM |
|---|---|---|---|---|---|---|---|---|---|---|---|---|
| 1938–39 | Cleveland Blues | Exhib | — | — | — | — | — | — | — | — | — | — |
| 1939–40 | Atlantic City Seagulls | EAHL | 34 | 2 | 3 | 5 | 19 | — | — | — | — | — |
| 1939–40 | Baltimore Orioles | EAHL | 26 | 4 | 2 | 6 | 12 | 9 | 0 | 3 | 3 | 8 |
| 1940–41 | Baltimore Orioles | EAHL | 49 | 6 | 6 | 12 | 71 | — | — | — | — | — |
| 1941–42 | Philadelphia Rockets | AHL | 54 | 5 | 19 | 24 | 30 | — | — | — | — | — |
| 1942–43 | Hershey Bears | AHL | 55 | 8 | 12 | 20 | 69 | 6 | 0 | 1 | 1 | 9 |
| 1943–44 | Hershey Bears | AHL | 47 | 9 | 22 | 31 | 48 | 6 | 0 | 2 | 2 | 8 |
| 1944–45 | New York Rangers | NHL | 35 | 2 | 4 | 6 | 14 | — | — | — | — | — |
| 1944–45 | Hershey Bears | AHL | 12 | 1 | 5 | 6 | 12 | — | — | — | — | — |
| 1945–46 | New York Rangers | NHL | 48 | 4 | 4 | 8 | 14 | — | — | — | — | — |
| 1946–47 | New York Rangers | NHL | 59 | 4 | 10 | 14 | 44 | — | — | — | — | — |
| 1947–48 | New York Rangers | NHL | 59 | 1 | 15 | 16 | 31 | 1 | 0 | 0 | 0 | 0 |
| 1948–49 | New York Rangers | NHL | 60 | 0 | 9 | 9 | 60 | — | — | — | — | — |
| 1949–50 | Hershey Bears | AHL | 55 | 2 | 20 | 22 | 29 | — | — | — | — | — |
| 1950–51 | Hershey Bears | AHL | 59 | 3 | 12 | 15 | 41 | 6 | 0 | 4 | 4 | 0 |
| 1951–52 | Calgary Stampeders | PCHL | 57 | 5 | 15 | 20 | 48 | — | — | — | — | — |
| 1952–53 | Troy Uncle Sam's Trojans | EAHL | 57 | 12 | 23 | 35 | 51 | — | — | — | — | — |
| NHL totals | | | 261 | 11 | 42 | 53 | 163 | 1 | 0 | 0 | 0 | 0 |
