= Carlin's Park =

Park in Maryland, United States

Coordinates: 39.325°N 76.663°W

Carlin's Park was a park in Baltimore, Maryland. It was founded in 1918 by John J. Carlin. The park was noted among members of the outdoor amusement park industry for the development of profitable winter operation and activities. Carlin's Iceland hosted indoor ice skating, winter carnivals, figure skaters, and was home to the Baltimore Orioles in the Eastern Amateur Hockey League.

Carlin's Park was hailed as "Clean Fun For the Entire Family", because it was a place where the entire family could be entertained. There was a roller coaster, a tea cup ride, a swing ride, and many other attractions including a large swimming pool, some circus acts, and fireworks. A common suggestion in ads of the time was to "make a date to roller skate" at Carlin's roller rink. Carlin's park also held all night dance parties with live bands. Traveling shows, including operas, would also make appearances at Carlin's Park.

A series of events in the mid-1950s spelled the end of Carlin's Park. The first event was the death of owner John J. Carlin in May 1954. Next came a fire in 1956 that destroyed the ice skating arena. The final blow to Carlin's Park was being overlooked by the City of Baltimore in the awarding of the new Civic Arena.
