= Norm Calladine =

Canadian ice hockey player (1916–1988)

- Born: July 30, 1916 Peterborough, Ontario, Canada
- Died: March 23, 1988 (aged 71) Providence, Rhode Island, United States
- Height: 5 ft 9 in (175 cm)
- Weight: 155 lb (70 kg; 11 st 1 lb)
- Position: Centre
- Shot: Right
- Played for: Boston Bruins
- Playing career: 1935–1946

Norman William Calladine (July 30, 1916 — March 23, 1988) was a Canadian ice hockey centre who played three seasons in the National Hockey League for the Boston Bruins from 1942–43 to 1944–45.

Calladine played sixty-three career NHL games, scoring nineteen goals and twenty-nine assists for forty-eight points.

== Career statistics ==
=== Regular season and playoffs ===
			Regular season					Playoffs
Season	Team	League	GP	G	A	Pts	PIM	GP	G	A	Pts	PIM
1938–39	Baltimore Orioles	EHL	51	33	41	74	4	—	—	—	—	—
1939–40	Baltimore Orioles	EHL	61	53	41	94	12	9	5	7	12	0
1940–41	Philadelphia Ramblers	AHL	52	8	24	32	4	—	—	—	—	—
1941–42	Providence Reds	AHL	56	32	23	55	6	—	—	—	—	—
1942–43	Providence Reds	AHL	51	16	35	51	7	2	0	0	0	0
1942–43	Boston Bruins	NHL	3	0	1	1	0	—	—	—	—	—
1943–44	Boston Bruins	NHL	49	16	27	43	8	—	—	—	—	—
1944–45	Boston Bruins	NHL	11	3	1	4	0	—	—	—	—	—
1944–45	Boston Olympics	EAHL	2	0	3	3	0	—	—	—	—	—
1944–45	Hershey Bears	AHL	14	4	8	12	0	11	3	4	7	0
1945–46	Hershey Bears	AHL	5	0	2	2	0	—	—	—	—	—
1945–46	Washington Lions	EAHL	22	13	6	19	0	12	9	7	16	0
AHL totals			178	60	92	152	17	13	3	4	7	0
NHL totals			63	19	29	48	8	—	—	—	—	—
