= Chick Webster =

Canadian ice hockey player (1920–2018)

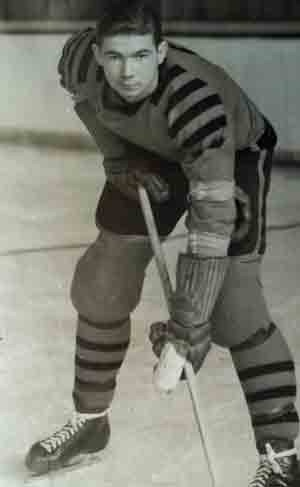
- Webster with the Petawawa Grenades, circa 1940s
- Born: November 3, 1920 Toronto, Ontario, Canada
- Died: January 18, 2018 (aged 97) Mattawa, Ontario, Canada
- Height: 5 ft 11 in (180 cm)
- Weight: 160 lb (73 kg; 11 st 6 lb)
- Position: Centre
- Shot: Left
- Played for: New York Rangers
- Playing career: 1940–1953

John Robert "Chick" Webster (November 3, 1920 – January 18, 2018) was a Canadian ice hockey player who played 14 games in the National Hockey League with the New York Rangers during the 1949–50 season. The rest of his career, which lasted from 1940 to 1953, was spent in the minor leagues. He also was a soldier in the Second World War.

== Biography ==
Born in Toronto, Ontario, Webster played 14 games with the New York Rangers during the 1949–50 season. His brother, Don Webster, also played briefly in the NHL, appearing in 27 games for the Toronto Maple Leafs. During World War II, he was a forward observer and gunner for the 13th Field Regiment of the 3rd Canadian Division. He served in Germany, Holland, England, France, and the North Sea.

Webster lived in Richmond Hill, Ontario, during his time with the Stouffville Clippers in the 1960s, and afterward lived in Mattawa, Ontario. After Milt Schmidt's death in January 2017, he became the oldest living former NHL player. His wife, Leona, died in 2009 of Alzheimer's disease. He died at home in Mattawa on January 18, 2018, at the age of 97. His nickname, Chick, was given to him in his playing days for his love for chewing Chiclets gum.

== Career statistics ==
=== Regular season and playoffs ===
			Regular season					Playoffs
Season	Team	League	GP	G	A	Pts	PIM	GP	G	A	Pts	PIM
1937–38	Toronto Native Sons	OHA	12	3	6	9	0	—	—	—	—	—
1938–39	Toronto Native Sons	OHA	14	6	4	10	8	8	4	3	7	8
1939–40	Toronto Native Sons	OHA	11	3	6	9	21	—	—	—	—	—
1939–40	Toronto Stockyards	TMHL	13	9	8	17	14	—	—	—	—	—
1940–41	Baltimore Orioles	EAHL	62	24	37	61	21	—	—	—	—	—
1941–42	St. Catharines Saints	OHA Sr	12	1	7	8	26	—	—	—	—	—
1941–42	Toronto Stockyards	RMHL	3	1	3	4	0	1	3	0	3	0
1941–42	Camp Borden Army	NDHL	—	—	—	—	—	1	0	1	1	0
1942–43	Petawawa Grenades	UOVHL	3	5	1	6	6	2	3	1	4	0
1942–43	Petawawa Grenates	Al-Cup	—	—	—	—	—	8	7	6	13	21
1945–46	Toronto Uptown Tires	TMHL	3	1	4	5	2	—	—	—	—	—
1945–46	Baltimore Clippers	EAHL	15	7	9	16	5	—	—	—	—	—
1946–47	New Haven Ramblers	AHL	47	9	15	24	26	3	0	2	2	6
1946–47	New York Rovers	EAHL	13	7	11	18	36	—	—	—	—	—
1947–48	New Haven Ramblers	AHL	65	22	37	59	12	4	1	1	2	0
1948–49	New Haven Ramblers	AHL	65	16	33	49	24	—	—	—	—	—
1949–50	New York Rangers	NHL	14	0	0	0	4	—	—	—	—	—
1949–50	New Haven Ramblers	AHL	38	9	17	26	16	—	—	—	—	—
1950–51	Tacoma Rockets	PCHL	63	20	28	48	36	6	1	1	2	2
1951–52	Cincinnati Mohawks	AHL	49	6	12	18	15	7	3	2	5	0
1952–53	Syracuse Warriors	AHL	13	2	2	4	0	—	—	—	—	—
1952–53	Vancouver Canucks	WHL	5	0	0	0	0	—	—	—	—	—
1952–53	Sault Ste. Marie Greyhounds	NOHA	12	1	7	8	4	2	0	1	1	0
AHL totals			227	64	116	180	93	11	4	3	7	0
NHL totals			14	0	0	0	4	—	—	—	—	—
