= Clare Wakshinski =

Canadian ice hockey player

- Born: April 14, 1936 (age 88); Walkleyburg, MB CAN
- Height: 6 ft 0 in (183 cm)
- Weight: 180 lb (82 kg; 12 st 12 lb)
- Position: Center
- Shot: Right
- Played for: Johnstown Jets; New York Rovers; Jersey Larks; Knoxville Knights; Long Island Ducks; Charlotte Checkers
- Playing career: 1953–1968

Clarence Walter Wakshinski (born April 14, 1936) was a Canadian professional hockey player who played 600 games in the Eastern Hockey League for the Johnstown Jets, New York Rovers, Jersey Larks, Knoxville Knights, Long Island Ducks and Charlotte Checkers.
