= Clarence Behling =

Canadian ice hockey player

- Born: March 16, 1916 Berlin, Ontario, Canada
- Died: July 24, 1994 (aged 78)
- Height: 6 ft 1 in (185 cm)
- Weight: 195 lb (88 kg; 13 st 13 lb)
- Position: Defence
- Shot: Right
- Played for: Detroit Red Wings
- Playing career: 1936–1950

Clarence Roy "Dick" Behling (March 16, 1916 – July 24, 1994) was a Canadian ice hockey defenceman.

== Career ==
Behling played five games in the National Hockey League with the Detroit Red Wings during the 1940–41 and 1942–43 seasons. The rest of his career, which lasted from 1936 to 1951, was spent in the minor leagues. He also played for the Kitchener-Waterloo Dutchmen, Indianapolis Capitals, Detroit Holzbaugh-Fords, Harringay Greyhounds, and Baltimore Orioles.

== Career statistics ==
=== Regular season and playoffs ===
			Regular season					Playoffs
Season	Team	League	GP	G	A	Pts	PIM	GP	G	A	Pts	PIM
1934–35	Kitchener Greenshirts	OHA	7	1	0	1	4	—	—	—	—	—
1935–36	Kitchener Greenshirts	OHA	—	—	—	—	—	—	—	—	—	—
1936–37	Baltimore Orioles	EAHL	48	9	5	14	16	3	1	2	3	2
1937–38	Baltimore Orioles	EAHL	56	14	11	25	26	—	—	—	—	—
1938–29	Harringay Greyhounds	ENL	8	10	18	28	—	—	—	—	—	—
1939–40	Detroit Holzbaugh	MOHL	35	9	7	16	22	1	0	0	0	0
1940–41	Detroit Red Wings	NHL	3	0	0	0	0	—	—	—	—	—
1940–41	Indianapolis Capitals	AHL	54	5	8	13	18	—	—	—	—	—
1941–42	Indianapolis Capitals	AHL	54	4	5	9	26	10	0	2	2	4
1942–43	Detroit Red Wings	NHL	2	1	0	1	0	—	—	—	—	—
1942–43	Indianapolis Capitals	AHL	22	1	4	5	10	—	—	—	—	—
1945–46	Indianapolis Capitals	AHL	17	0	3	3	4	5	0	0	0	0
1946–47	Hamilton Patricias	OHA Sr	14	3	4	7	6	3	0	0	0	0
1947–48	Kitchener-Waterloo Dutchmen	OHA Sr	36	7	15	22	16	10	1	5	6	6
1948–49	Kitchener-Waterloo Dutchmen	OHA Sr	39	1	13	14	20	12	4	3	7	6
1949–50	Kitchener-Waterloo Dutchmen	OHA Sr	26	1	9	10	10	14	0	3	3	6
1950–51	Kitchener-Waterloo Dutchmen	OHA Sr	23	2	9	11	4	—	—	—	—	—
AHL totals			147	10	20	30	58	15	0	2	2	4
NHL totals			5	1	0	1	0	—	—	—	—	—
