= Gordon Tottle =

American ice hockey defenseman

- Born: October 14, 1925; Detroit, Michigan, US
- Died: March 9, 1987 (aged 61); Harrisburg, North Carolina, US
- Height: 6 ft 2 in (188 cm)
- Weight: 211 lb (96 kg; 15 st 1 lb)
- Position: Defense
- Shot: Left
- Played for: Springfield Indians; Syracuse Warriors; Charlotte Checkers
- National team: United States
- Playing career: 1945–1963

Gordon Elwood Tottle (October 14, 1925 – March 9, 1987) was an American professional ice hockey player. As a defenseman, he played 456 games in the American Hockey League with the Springfield Indians. In 18 seasons of professional hockey, he was a first-team all-star in both the American Hockey League, and the Eastern Hockey League, and played for the United States men's national ice hockey team in the 1962 Ice Hockey World Championships.

== Early life ==
Gordon Elwood Tottle was born in Detroit, Michigan, on October 14, 1925. He grew up in Woodstock, Ontario, Canada.

== Playing career ==
Tottle began his professional hockey career with the Dallas Texans, and the Fort Worth Rangers, in the United States Hockey League. He signed with the Springfield Indians, and wore uniform #5 for ten seasons. During the three seasons which the Indians played as the Syracuse Warriors, he led the team with 187 penalty minutes. He was named a first-team all-star in the 1954–55 AHL season, scoring six goals, and 31 points, his highest totals in the American Hockey League (AHL). After his ten seasons with the Indians/Warriors, he had played the eighth most games (433), in Springfield AHL history, and was inducted into Springfield Hockey Hall of Fame.

Tottle then played one season in the Western Hockey League, followed by four seasons with Charlotte in the Eastern Hockey League. In his first two seasons with the Charlotte Clippers, he was named a first-team all-star in 1958–59, and 1959–60. In his third season in Charlotte, the team was renamed to the Charlotte Checkers, and Tottle was named its player-coach. He led the team to 25 wins in 64 games, but missed the playoffs. During his fourth season in Charlotte, Tottle played for the United States men's national ice hockey team in the 1962 Ice Hockey World Championships. He later returned to his home state of Michigan, to play a final season with the Port Huron Flags in the International Hockey League in 1962–63.

== Personal life ==
Tottle was married to Ann, and had two daughters and a stepson. He was the owner and operator of Gordie's Amoco in Harrisburg, North Carolina. He was a member of the Oak Branch Masonic Lodge No. 261 in Innerkip, Ontario, a member of the Scottish Rite and the Carolina Consistory, and a member of the Commonwealth Baptist Church. He died from cancer on March 9, 1987, at his home in Harrisburg, and was interred in Sunset Memory Gardens.

== Career statistics ==
Regular season and playoffs statistics.

			Regular Season					Playoffs
Season	Team	League	GP	G	A	Pts	PIM	GP	G	A	Pts	PIM
1945–46	Dallas Texans	USHL	3	0	0	0	4	–	–	–	–	–
1945–46	Fort Worth Rangers	USHL	38	1	6	7	4	–	–	–	–	–
1946–47	Fort Worth Rangers	USHL	58	1	7	8	105	9	0	0	0	6
1947–48	Springfield Indians	AHL	62	3	12	15	85	–	–	–	–	–
1948–49	Springfield Indians	AHL	68	4	17	21	75	2	0	0	0	2
1949–50	Springfield Indians	AHL	70	8	17	25	58	2	0	0	0	0
1950–51	Springfield Indians	AHL	49	2	19	21	81	3	0	1	1	2
1951–52	Syracuse Warriors	AHL	49	1	18	19	81	–	–	–	–	–
1952–53	Syracuse Warriors	AHL	60	6	18	24	55	4	0	1	1	7
1953–54	Syracuse Warriors	AHL	38	0	9	9	51	–	–	–	–	–
1953–54	Springfield Indians	QHL	21	2	6	8	28	–	–	–	–	–
1954–55	Springfield Indians	AHL	60	6	25	31	93	3	0	1	1	2
1955–56	Springfield Indians	AHL	60	2	11	13	75	–	–	–	–	–
1956–57	Springfield Indians	AHL	64	5	20	25	80	–	–	–	–	–
1957–58	Calgary Stampeders/Seattle Americans	WHL	60	2	19	21	73	9	0	2	2	18
1958–59	Charlotte Clippers	EHL	40	1	23	24	56	–	–	–	–	–
1959–60	Charlotte Clippers	EHL	63	6	38	44	63	6	1	2	3	0
1960–61	Charlotte Checkers	EHL	58	2	14	16	47	–	–	–	–	–
1961–62	Charlotte Checkers	EHL	65	5	23	28	37	–	–	–	–	–
1962–63	Port Huron Flags	IHL	20	2	2	4	8	–	–	–	–	–
AHL Totals			456	30	135	165	582	14	0	3	3	13
EHL Totals			105	6	46	52	93	6	1	2	3	0
