= Rosario Joanette =

Canadian ice hockey player

- Joanette with the Valleyfield Braves in 1945
- Born: July 27, 1916 Valleyfield, Quebec, Canada
- Died: October 9, 1998 (aged 82)
- Height: 5 ft 8 in (173 cm)
- Weight: 165 lb (75 kg; 11 st 11 lb)
- Position: Centre
- Shot: Right
- Played for: Montreal Canadiens
- Playing career: 1939–1957

Joseph Treffle Rosario "Kitoute" Joanette (July 27, 1916 – October 9, 1998) was a Canadian professional ice hockey centre. He played 2 games in the National Hockey League for the Montreal Canadiens during the 1944–45 season. The rest of his career, which lasted from 1939 to 1957, was spent in the minor leagues.

== Biography ==
Joanette was born in Valleyfield, Quebec. spent most of his playing days with the Valleyfield Braves. Joanette was a prolific goal scorer and routinely netted 20 goals-plus per season. In 1944–45, the same season he played his two games with Montreal Canadiens, Joanette led the QPHL with 45 goals, 56 assists, and 101 points in just 37 games.

In Joanette's 2 regular season contests with the Montreal Canadiens, he registered 1 assist.

== Career statistics ==
=== Regular season and playoffs ===
			Regular season					Playoffs
Season	Team	League	GP	G	A	Pts	PIM	GP	G	A	Pts	PIM
1939–40	Valleyfield Braves	QPHL	26	3	8	11	2	4	2	1	3	6
1940–41	Valleyfield Braves	MCHL	37	28	37	65	18	3	0	0	0	2
1941–42	Valleyfield V's	MCHL	26	17	23	40	32	7	4	4	8	0
1942–43	Valleyfield Braves	VDSHL	—	—	—	—	—	—	—	—	—	—
1943–44	Valleyfield Braves	MCHL	—	—	—	—	—	—	—	—	—	—
1944–45	Montreal Canadiens	NHL	2	0	1	1	4	—	—	—	—	—
1944–45	Valleyfield Braves	QPHL	37	45	56	101	30	11	6	7	13	8
1944–45	Valleyfield Braves	Al-Cup	—	—	—	—	—	3	1	0	1	0
1945–46	Valleyfield Braves	QSHL	40	23	25	48	17	—	—	—	—	—
1945–46	Shawinigan Falls Cataractes	QSHL	—	—	—	—	—	4	2	1	3	11
1946–47	Valleyfield Braves	QSHL	39	13	22	35	41	—	—	—	—	—
1946–47	Baltimore Clippers	EAHL	—	—	—	—	—	9	2	1	3	11
1947–48	Valleyfield Braves	QSHL	44	20	37	57	23	6	6	6	12	2
1948–49	Valleyfield Braves	QSHL	51	23	33	56	11	4	0	2	2	0
1949–50	Valleyfield Braves	QSHL	59	23	50	73	22	5	1	4	5	4
1950–51	Valleyfield Braves	QSHL	58	30	42	72	18	16	13	6	19	8
1951–52	Valleyfield Braves	QSHL	55	18	31	49	14	6	0	4	4	0
1952–53	Valleyfield Braves	QSHL	58	18	34	52	6	4	0	1	1	2
1953–54	Valleyfield Braves	QSHL	60	13	16	29	10	7	2	4	6	0
1954–55	Valleyfield Braves	QSHL	53	13	37	50	11	—	—	—	—	—
1955–56	Trois-Rivières Lions	QSHL	32	2	10	12	2	—	—	—	—	—
1955–56	Cornwall Colts	EOHL	16	21	20	41	18	7	2	8	10	18
1956–57	Cornwall Chevies	OHA Sr	49	22	31	53	20	6	0	2	2	4
QSHL totals			549	196	337	533	175	52	24	28	52	27
NHL totals			2	0	1	1	4	—	—	—	—	—
