= John Voss (ice hockey) =

Canadian ice hockey player

- Born: February 21, 1946; Toronto, Ontario, Canada
- Died: November 12, 2016 (aged 70); Greensboro, North Carolina, U.S.
- Height: 5 ft 9 in (175 cm)
- Weight: 175 lb (79 kg; 12 st 7 lb)
- Position: Goaltender
- Caught: Left
- Played for: EHL; Greensboro Generals; Charlotte Checkers; CHL; Fort Worth Wings; Omaha Knights; AHL; Tidewater Wings; Baltimore Clippers; Virginia Red Wings; SHL; Greensboro Generals; NAHL; Beauce Jaros; ACHL; Winston-Salem Thunderbirds
- Playing career: 1966–1982

John Voss (born February 21, 1946 – November 12, 2016) was a Canadian professional ice hockey goaltender.

== Early life ==
Voss was born in Toronto. He played junior hockey with the Kitchener Rangers of the Ontario Hockey Association and began his professional career in the Eastern Hockey League with the Greensboro Generals for the 1966–67 and 1967–68 seasons.

== Career ==
From 1969 to 1973, Voss played with the Charlotte Checkers of the Eastern Hockey League (EHL), where he was recognized for his outstanding performance during the 1970–71 season by being awarded the George L. Davis Jr. Trophy for posting the league's best goals against average of 1.87, and was named to the EHL Southern Division First All-Star Team.

The John Voss Trophy is awarded annually to the Central Hockey League goaltender with the best goals against average for the season, based on at least 20 games played.

== Awards and honours ==
Award	Year
George L. Davis Jr. Trophy - EHL Best Goals Against Average	1970–71
EHL Southern Division First Team	1970–71
