= George Grigor =

Canadian ice hockey player

- Born: September 3, 1916; Edinburgh, Scotland, GBR
- Died: October 7, 1979 (aged 63); Toronto, Ontario, Canada
- Height: 5 ft 7 in (170 cm)
- Weight: 150 lb (68 kg; 10 st 10 lb)
- Position: Centre
- Shot: Right
- Played for: Chicago Black Hawks
- Playing career: 1936–1948

George Edward Grigor (September 3, 1916 – October 7, 1979) was a Canadian ice hockey centre who played 2 games in the National Hockey League for the Chicago Black Hawks during the 1943–44 season. The rest of his career, which lasted from 1936 to 1948, was mainly spent in senior leagues.

== Biography ==
Born in Edinburgh, Scotland, but grew up in Toronto, Ontario and played junior with the local Young Rangers. In his final year of junior, 1935–36, he also played in the Toronto Mercantile Hockey League with the Toronto Dominions. He spent the next three years with a variety of commercial and OHA Senior A clubs before joining the Baltimore Orioles of the Eastern Amateur Hockey League in 1939. He recorded consecutive 20-goal seasons with Baltimore before returning to Toronto. Between 1941 and 1950, he continued to play for teams in the Mercantile league, the Toronto Hockey League's commercial division, and the OHA Senior A league.

On January 6, 1944, while a member of Stafford Industries of the Toronto Mercantile Hockey League, he made his NHL debut with the Chicago Black Hawks, scoring their only goal in a 6–1 loss to the Toronto Maple Leafs at Maple Leaf Gardens. His only other NHL appearance was a few weeks later, on January 28, when the Black Hawks again visited Toronto. The Globe and Mail reported that the Black Hawks would have liked to sign Grigor, but his job in a war plant kept him in Toronto.

He died at Toronto in 1979.

== Career statistics ==
=== Regular season and playoffs ===
			Regular season					Playoffs
Season	Team	League	GP	G	A	Pts	PIM	GP	G	A	Pts	PIM
1934–35	Toronto Young Rangers	OHA	9	3	2	5	11	2	1	0	1	0
1935–36	Toronto Young Rangers	OHA	11	8	6	14	25	2	0	0	0	0
1935–36	Toronto Dominion	TIHL	16	3	4	7	16	—	—	—	—	—
1936–37	Toronto Dominion	TIHL	9	1	3	4	12	3	0	1	1	4
1938–39	Niagara Falls Brights	OHA Sr	20	4	11	15	48	—	—	—	—	—
1938–39	Niagara Falls Brights	Al-Cup	7	6	5	11	28	—	—	—	—	—
1939–40	Baltimore Orioles	EAHL	59	21	23	44	58	9	2	7	9	9
1940–41	Baltimore Orioles	EAHL	59	22	32	54	95	—	—	—	—	—
1941–42	Toronto Marlies	OHA Sr	25	9	12	21	71	6	0	3	3	10
1941–42	Toronto Kodaks	TMHL	11	8	13	21	4	7	1	4	5	8
1942–43	Toronto Research Colonels	OHA Sr	10	6	15	21	6	—	—	—	—	—
1942–43	Toronto Staffords	TIHL	18	11	17	28	42	6	2	5	7	6
1943–44	Toronto Staffords	TIHL	26	14	36	50	20	7	3	4	7	34
1943–44	Chicago Black Hawks	NHL	2	1	0	1	0	1	0	0	0	0
1944–45	Toronto Staffords	OHA Sr	8	1	4	5	8	—	—	—	—	—
1944–45	Toronto People's Credit	TIHL	29	18	26	44	20	6	5	10	15	4
1945–46	Toronto People's Credit	TIHL	29	13	20	33	23	5	1	4	5	14
1946–47	Toronto People's Credit	TIHL	27	12	27	39	51	3	0	0	0	10
1947–48	Toronto People's Credit	TIHL	26	7	25	32	22	5	0	2	2	12
EAHL totals			118	43	55	98	153	9	2	7	9	9
NHL totals			2	1	0	1	0	—	—	—	—	—

== See also ==
- List of National Hockey League players from the United Kingdom
