= Randy Murray (ice hockey) =

Canadian ice hockey player (born 1945)

- Born: August 24, 1945 (age 80) Chatham, Ontario, Canada
- Height: 6 ft 1 in (185 cm)
- Weight: 195 lb (88 kg; 13 st 13 lb)
- Position: Defence
- Shot: Right
- Played for: Toronto Maple Leafs
- Playing career: 1966–1973

Randall Alexander Scott Murray (born August 24, 1945) is a Canadian former professional ice hockey defenceman who played three games in the National Hockey League for the Toronto Maple Leafs during the 1969–70 season. The rest of his career, which lasted from 1966 to 1974, was spent in the minor leagues.

== Career statistics ==
=== Regular season and playoffs ===
			Regular season					Playoffs
Season	Team	League	GP	G	A	Pts	PIM	GP	G	A	Pts	PIM
1964–65	Calgary Buffaloes	AJHL	—	—	—	—	—	—	—	—	—	—
1965–66	London Nationals	OHA	38	11	13	24	120	—	—	—	—	—
1966–67	Charlotte Checkers	EHL	65	10	25	35	148	8	1	4	5	19
1966–67	Tulsa Oilers	CHL	5	0	0	0	17	—	—	—	—	—
1967–68	Tulsa Oilers	CHL	61	3	14	17	108	6	1	0	1	12
1968–69	Tulsa Oilers	CHL	64	7	14	21	97	7	2	4	6	16
1969–70	Toronto Maple Leafs	NHL	3	0	0	0	2	—	—	—	—	—
1969–70	Tulsa Oilers	CHL	55	5	14	19	90	6	0	0	0	13
1970–71	Tulsa Oilers	CHL	68	2	27	29	143	—	—	—	—	—
1971–72	Calgary Stampeders	ASHL	24	6	5	11	47	—	—	—	—	—
1972–73	Tulsa Oilers	CHL	38	0	10	10	59	—	—	—	—	—
1973–74	Calgary Trojans	AIHA	—	—	—	—	—	—	—	—	—	—
CHL totals			291	17	79	96	514	19	3	4	7	41
NHL totals			3	0	0	0	2	—	—	—	—	—
