= Crescent-Hamilton Athletic Club =

- City: Brooklyn, New York
- League: Eastern Amateur Hockey League (EAHL)
- Operated: 1933–1935
- Home arena: Madison Square Garden

Championships
- Playoff championships: 1935

The Crescent-Hamilton Athletic Club was an American semi-professional ice hockey team based in Brooklyn, New York. The team played their home games at Madison Square Garden and were named for Hamilton Avenue, which runs through northwest Brooklyn.

== History ==
After the demise of the Tri-State Hockey League, most of the former teams formed a new circuit, the Eastern Amateur Hockey League. The Crescent-Hamilton Athletic Club was founded as an inaugural member and began play in the fall of 1933. Despite playing their games at Madison Square Garden, Hamilton A.C. was not a hit in the ticket office; the team finished their first season well below .500. The club recovered in year two, winning the league title with a record of 15–5–1 but that turned out to be their swan song as the club was disbanded after the year.

== Season-by-season record ==
Note: GP = Games played, W = Wins, L = Losses, T = Ties, Pts = Points, GF = Goals for, GA = Goals against

EHL Season	GP	W	L	T	Pts	GF	GA	Finish	Coach	Playoffs
1933–34	22	6	13	3	15	22	56	5th	Denton "Dinty" Mullin	none
1934–35	21	15	5	1	31	67	35	1st	Denton "Dinty" Mullin	none
