= Ross Brooks =

Canadian ice hockey player (born 1937)

- Born: October 17, 1937 (age 88) Toronto, Ontario, Canada
- Height: 5 ft 8 in (173 cm)
- Weight: 173 lb (78 kg; 12 st 5 lb)
- Position: Goaltender
- Caught: Left
- Played for: Boston Bruins
- Playing career: 1958–1976

Donald Ross Brooks (born October 17, 1937) is a Canadian former professional ice hockey goaltender who played three seasons with the Boston Bruins of the National Hockey League (NHL) between 1972 and 1975. His NHL debut at the age of 36 made him one of the oldest rookies in professional hockey history.

== Playing career ==
Brooks had a long minor league career which included seven seasons for the Providence Reds of the American Hockey League (AHL), and shared the Harry "Hap" Holmes Memorial Award for lowest goals-against average in the AHL with teammate Dan Bouchard in 1972. In the 1972–73 NHL season, the Bruins, who owned his rights, lost several goaltenders: top prospect Bouchard to expansion, star Gerry Cheevers to the World Hockey Association and veteran Eddie Johnston to trade with the Toronto Maple Leafs. This opened the door for Brooks' recall as the backup goaltender. He excelled swiftly, matching an NHL record set by Bruins' goaltender Tiny Thompson in the 1920s for the longest consecutive winning streak by a goaltender, 14 games (since surpassed by Patrick Lalime).

Brooks played for the Bruins from 1972 until 1975, after which, upon the return of Cheevers to the organization, he played a single season for the Bruins' AHL Rochester Americans farm team before retiring. Playing for a powerhouse team that regularly finished around the top of the league standings, he compiled a career record of 37 wins, and only 7 losses and 6 ties with a goals against average of 2.63. His career-winning percentage is one of the highest recorded for goalies with 50 or more decisions.

== Post-playing career ==
After his retirement, Brooks was a longtime executive for the Bruins' farm team in Providence, leaving that post in 2000. More recently, he managed the operations of Providence College's Schneider Arena. He was inducted into the Rhode Island Hockey Hall of Fame in 2025.

== Career statistics ==
=== Regular season and playoffs ===
			Regular season									Playoffs
Season	Team	League	GP	W	L	T	MIN	GA	SO	GAA	SV%	GP	W	L	MIN	GA	SO	GAA	SV%
1954–55	Barrie Flyers	OHA	11	—	—	—	660	69	0	6.27	—	—	—	—	—	—	—	—	—
1955–56	Lakeshore Bruins	MJAHL	—	—	—	—	—	—	—	—	—	—	—	—	—	—	—	—	—
1956–57	Barrie Flyers	OHA	43	11	31	1	2580	182	4	4.23	—	2	0	2	120	9	0	4.50	—
1957–58	Barrie Flyers	OHA	23	—	—	—	1380	110	1	4.78	—	3	1	2	180	16	0	5.33	—
1958–59	North Bay Trappers	OHA Sr	12	—	—	—	720	63	0	5.25	—	—	—	—	—	—	—	—	—
1958–59	Washington Presidents	EHL	26	—	—	—	1560	118	1	4.54	—	—	—	—	—	—	—	—	—
1959–60	Philadelphia Ramblers	EHL	—	—	—	—	—	—	—	—	—	2	1	1	120	5	0	2.50	—
1960–61	Jersey Larks	EHL	1	1	0	0	60	3	0	3.00	—	—	—	—	—	—	—	—	—
1960–61	Providence Reds	AHL	2	—	—	—	20	3	0	9.00	—	—	—	—	—	—	—	—	—
1960–61	Philadelphia Ramblers	EHL	64	32	28	4	3840	278	0	4.34	—	3	0	3	180	13	0	4.33	—
1961–62	Philadelphia Ramblers	EHL	68	28	38	2	4080	337	0	4.96	—	3	—	—	180	12	0	4.00	—
1961–62	Long Island Ducks	EHL	1	0	1	0	60	7	0	7.00	—	—	—	—	—	—	—	—	—
1961–62	Johnstown Jets	EHL	2	0	2	0	120	16	0	8.00	—	3	0	3	180	12	0	4.00	—
1962–63	Philadelphia Ramblers	EHL	63	27	33	3	3780	272	3	4.32	—	3	0	3	180	13	0	4.33	—
1963–64	Roving Goaltender	EHL	16	—	—	—	960	68	1	4.25	—	—	—	—	—	—	—	—	—
1963–64	Providence Reds	AHL	3	2	1	0	180	6	0	2.00	—	—	—	—	—	—	—	—	—
1964–65	Providence Reds	AHL	12	1	10	0	725	70	1	5.79	—	—	—	—	—	—	—	—	—
1965–66	Providence Reds	AHL	13	3	9	1	770	66	0	5.14	—	—	—	—	—	—	—	—	—
1966–67	Providence Reds	AHL	32	9	16	6	1849	137	0	4.45	—	—	—	—	—	—	—	—	—
1967–68	Providence Reds	AHL	19	7	10	1	1120	82	0	4.39	—	1	0	0	20	1	0	3.00	—
1968–69	Providence Reds	AHL	22	7	10	0	1097	80	0	4.38	—	—	—	—	—	—	—	—	—
1969–70	Providence Reds	AHL	13	—	—	—	612	43	0	4.22	—	—	—	—	—	—	—	—	—
1970–71	Oklahoma City Blazers	CHL	9	—	—	—	530	44	0	4.99	—	1	0	1	20	5	0	15.00	—
1970–71	Phoenix Roadrunners	WHL	1	0	1	0	60	5	0	5.00	—	—	—	—	—	—	—	—	—
1970–71	Providence Reds	AHL	12	1	7	3	657	40	1	3.65	—	—	—	—	—	—	—	—	—
1971–72	Boston Braves	AHL	30	14	8	7	1639	65	1	2.38	—	5	2	2	248	12	0	2.90	—
1972–73	Boston Bruins	NHL	16	11	1	3	910	40	1	2.64	.904	1	0	0	20	3	0	9.00	.727
1972–73	Boston Braves	AHL	7	—	—	—	379	16	0	2.52	—	—	—	—	—	—	—	—	—
1973–74	Boston Bruins	NHL	21	16	3	0	1170	46	3	2.36	.917	—	—	—	—	—	—	—	—
1973–74	Boston Braves	AHL	5	3	0	1	280	15	0	3.21	—	—	—	—	—	—	—	—	—
1974–75	Boston Bruins	NHL	17	10	3	3	966	48	0	2.98	.884	—	—	—	—	—	—	—	—
1975–76	Rochester Americans	AHL	34	20	12	2	2056	103	2	3.00	—	4	2	2	239	17	0	4.27	—
NHL totals			54	37	7	6	3045	134	4	2.64	.903	1	0	0	20	3	0	9.00	.727

== See also ==
- List of select Jewish ice hockey players
