= Don Webster =

Don Webster may refer to:

- Don Webster (ice hockey)
- Don Webster (media personality)
