= Atlantic City Seagulls =

Atlantic City Seagulls may refer to:

- Atlantic City Seagulls (EHL), a member of the Eastern Amateur Hockey League between 1933 and 1953
- Atlantic City Seagulls (basketball), a member of the United States Basketball League
- Atlantic City Seagulls, one of the various names of the Washington Generals basketball exhibition team
