= Eddie Barry (ice hockey) =

American ice hockey player (1919–2016)

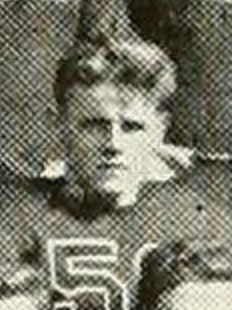
- Barry pictured c. 1940 at Northeastern University
- Born: October 12, 1919 Wellesley, Massachusetts, U.S.
- Died: February 12, 2016 (aged 96) Needham, Massachusetts, U.S.
- Height: 5 ft 10 in (178 cm)
- Weight: 180 lb (82 kg; 12 st 12 lb)
- Position: Left wing
- Shot: Left
- Played for: Boston Bruins
- Playing career: 1941–1950

Edward Thomas Barry (October 12, 1919 – February 12, 2016) was an American professional ice hockey player. Barry also played for the Boston Olympics of the Eastern Hockey League and the Boston Bruins, and later became the coach at Boston State College. He was inducted into the Northeastern University athletics Hall of Fame in 1976, and the University of Massachusetts Boston Hall of Fame in 2003.

== Playing career ==
Born in 1919, Barry learned to play hockey in his hometown of Wellesley, Massachusetts. He played briefly for Northeastern University in Boston, but left school during his freshman year in the winter of 1940 to skate for the Boston Olympics of the Eastern Hockey League from 1941 to 1943, captaining the team in 1941 and 1942.

Following a brief tour of duty in the Coast Guard during the World War II era, when he played for the United States Coast Guard Cutters, Barry returned to play for the Boston Bruins for 19 games during the 1946–47 season, making him the first American to play for the Bruins since the 1920s. He rejoined the Olympics for four more seasons before becoming head coach in 1950. During his two seasons as coach, Barry went 63-51-7. Barry was the head coach at Boston State College (now part of UMass Boston) from 1962 to 1982 and guided them to two ECAC Division II Tournaments and two NAIA tournaments. At Boston State, Barry founded the Codfish Bowl, a lower division version of the Beanpot. In 1965, BSC went 20–0. He was also a referee for several national collegiate championship games.

As a golfer, Barry won 12 club championships at the Charles River Country Club, Newton, the New England Amateur Championship, and New England and Massachusetts Senior Amateur titles. He is honored by a bronze plaque in front of the clubhouse. After leaving the Bruins, Barry went into the insurance business and became a partner at Barry and Farrell Insurance Agency in Needham, Massachusetts, where his son and grandchildren now work. He died on February 12, 2016. Later in the Fall of 2016, the hockey rink in the Clark Athletic Center at UMass/Boston was renamed Edward T. Barry Rink

== Career statistics ==
=== Regular season and playoffs ===
			Regular season					Playoffs
Season	Team	League	GP	G	A	Pts	PIM	GP	G	A	Pts	PIM
1939–40	Northeastern University	Uni	—	—	—	—	—	—	—	—	—	—
1940–41	Boston Olympics	EAHL	25	3	6	9	24	4	2	1	3	5
1941–42	Boston Olympics	EAHL	45	19	6	25	40	6	4	0	4	13
1942–43	Boston Olympics	EAHL	7	8	2	10	2	—	—	—	—	—
1942–43	United States Coast Guard Cutters	EAHL	31	20	17	37	17	12	8	6	14	13
1943–44	United States Coast Guard Cutters	EAHL	37	22	20	42	28	12	8	9	17	8
1945–46	Boston Olympics	EAHL	48	26	25	51	57	8	4	7	11	4
1946–47	Boston Olympics	EAHL	32	21	15	36	61	11	0	3	3	9
1946–47	Boston Bruins	NHL	19	1	3	4	2	—	—	—	—	—
1947–48	Boston Olympics	QSHL	40	18	10	28	47	—	—	—	—	—
1947–48	Boston Olympics	EAHL	20	17	8	25	69	—	—	—	—	—
1948–49	Boston Olympics	EAHL	23	15	13	28	43	—	—	—	—	—
1949–50	Boston Olympics	EAHL	13	10	2	12	23	—	—	—	—	—
1950–51	Boston Olympics	EAHL	—	—	—	—	—	—	—	—	—	—
EAHL totals			258	146	101	247	341	42	26	23	49	43
NHL totals			19	1	3	4	2	—	—	—	—	—
