= Jim McNulty (ice hockey) =

Canadian ice hockey player (1930–2006)

- Born: January 31, 1930 St. Catharines, Ontario, Canada
- Died: September 2, 2006 (aged 76)
- Height: 5 ft 8 in (173 cm)
- Weight: 160 lb (73 kg; 11 st 6 lb)
- Position: Centre
- Shot: Right
- Played for: EHL; Baltimore Clippers; Charlotte Clippers; Charlotte Checkers
- Playing career: 1954–1967

Jim McNulty (January 31, 1930 – September 2, 2006) was a Canadian professional ice hockey player.

== Career ==
McNulty played in the Eastern Hockey League (EHL) for 13 years from 1954 to 1967 and in playoffs twice, first, during the 1956 – 1957 season and, later, during the 1959–1960 season. McNulty played his first season with the Baltimore Clippers, four subsequent seasons with the Charlotte Clippers and, thereafter, with the Charlotte Checkers.

In 2008, McNulty was honoured when he was selected as inaugural inductee into the Charlotte Hockey Hall of Fame.

== Death ==
McNulty died on September 2, 2006, at the age of 76.
