= Herb Foster =

Canadian ice hockey player

- Born: August 8, 1913; Brockville, Ontario, Canada
- Died: June 2, 2003 (aged 89)
- Height: 5 ft 10 in (178 cm)
- Weight: 168 lb (76 kg; 12 st 0 lb)
- Position: Left wing
- Shot: Left
- Played for: New York Rangers
- Playing career: 1932–1950

Herbert Stanley Foster (August 9, 1913 – June 2, 2003) was a Canadian professional ice hockey player who played six games in the National Hockey League with the New York Rangers, five games in 1940 and one game in 1948. The rest of his career, which lasted from 1932 to 1950, was mainly spent in the Eastern Amateur Hockey League.

== Career statistics ==
=== Regular season and playoffs ===
			Regular season					Playoffs
Season	Team	League	GP	G	A	Pts	PIM	GP	G	A	Pts	PIM
1932–33	Atlantic City Seagulls	EAHL	18	18	5	23	0	3	2	0	2	0
1933–34	Atlantic City Seagulls	EAHL	19	20	6	26	16	5	4	3	7	4
1934–35	Atlantic City Seagulls	EAHL	18	4	3	7	2	10	6	2	8	0
1935–36	Atlantic City Seagulls	EAHL	40	25	3	28	24	8	5	2	7	2
1936–37	Atlantic City Seagulls	EAHL	48	43	11	54	12	3	5	0	5	0
1937–38	Atlantic City Seagulls	EAHL	57	39	32	71	13	—	—	—	—	—
1938–39	Atlantic City Seagulls	EAHL	52	52	23	75	2	—	—	—	—	—
1939–40	Philadelphia Ramblers	IAHL	54	21	22	43	14	—	—	—	—	—
1940–41	New York Rangers	NHL	5	1	0	1	0	—	—	—	—	—
1940–41	Philadelphia Ramblers	AHL	53	24	22	46	18	—	—	—	—	—
1941–42	Cleveland Barons	AHL	57	23	15	38	10	5	1	1	2	0
1942–43	Cleveland Barons	AHL	37	6	16	22	0	—	—	—	—	—
1942–43	Washington Lions	AHL	19	12	13	25	0	—	—	—	—	—
1942–43	Pittsburgh Hornets	AHL	1	0	0	0	0	—	—	—	—	—
1943–44	Kingston Army	OHA Sr	14	12	15	27	2	—	—	—	—	—
1946–47	Shawinigan Falls Cataractes	QSHL	37	13	11	24	29	3	0	1	1	4
1947–48	New York Rangers	NHL	1	0	0	0	0	—	—	—	—	—
1947–48	New York Rovers	QSHL	21	7	5	12	0	4	3	1	4	0
1947–48	Atlantic City Seagulls	EAHL	34	37	24	61	8	—	—	—	—	—
1949–50	Atlantic City Seagulls	EAHL	47	27	29	56	12	6	3	3	6	0
EAHL totals			333	265	136	401	89	35	25	10	35	6
NHL totals			6	1	0	1	0	—	—	—	—	—
