= Tri-State Hockey League =

The Tri-State Hockey League was a minor professional ice hockey league that operated in the Northeastern United States in the 1932-33 season. The Atlantic City Seagulls won the championship in the leagues lone season. The other participants were the Baltimore Orioles, Hershey B'ars, and the Philadelphia Comets.

The league was replaced by the Eastern Amateur Hockey League on December 5, 1933.
