= Jack Stoddard =

Canadian ice hockey player

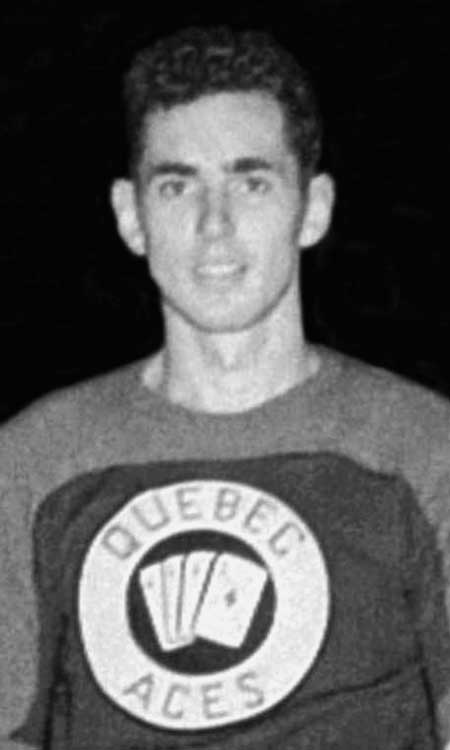
- Stoddard with the Quebec Aces in 1946
- Born: September 26, 1926 Stoney Creek, Ontario, Canada
- Died: January 29, 2014 (aged 87) Owen Sound, Ontario, Canada
- Height: 6 ft 3 in (191 cm)
- Weight: 185 lb (84 kg; 13 st 3 lb)
- Position: Right wing
- Shot: Right
- Played for: New York Rangers
- Playing career: 1944–1962

John Edward "Jack" Stoddard (September 26, 1926 – January 29, 2014) a Canadian ice hockey player. He played 80 games in the National Hockey League with the New York Rangers during the 1951–52 and 1952–53 seasons. The rest of his career, which lasted from 1944 to 1962, was spent in the minor leagues. Stoddard died in Owen Sound in 2014.

== Playing career ==
Stoddard played junior in the Ontario Hockey Association between 1943 and 1946. In addition to the Rangers, he also played for other teams such as the Baltimore Clippers, the Providence Reds, and the Quebec Aces.

When traded to the Rangers in January 1952 for Pat Egan, Zellio Toppazzini, and Jean Paul Denis, he was leading the AHL with 48 points in 34 games. He was the NHL's tallest player in the 1951–52 and 1952–53 seasons and was the first Rangers player to wear the number 13.

== Career statistics ==
=== Regular season and playoffs ===
			Regular season					Playoffs
Season	Team	League	GP	G	A	Pts	PIM	GP	G	A	Pts	PIM
1943–44	Stratford Kroehlers	OHA	13	7	6	13	0	—	—	—	—	—
1943–44	Hamilton Whizzers	OHA	5	4	4	8	2	—	—	—	—	—
1944–45	Hamilton Patricias	OHA Sr	4	4	1	5	0	—	—	—	—	—
1945–46	Hamilton Lloyds	OHA	16	4	7	11	17	—	—	—	—	—
1946–47	Baltimore Clippers	EAHL	53	22	19	41	22	9	8	3	11	2
1947–48	Providence Reds	AHL	45	6	7	13	4	5	1	1	2	0
1947–48	Quebec Aces	QSHL	10	5	1	6	16	—	—	—	—	—
1948–49	Providence Reds	AHL	61	25	28	53	36	14	4	4	8	6
1949–50	Providence Reds	AHL	69	32	29	61	31	4	1	2	3	2
1950–51	Providence Reds	AHL	70	37	27	64	24	—	—	—	—	—
1951–52	New York Rangers	NHL	20	4	2	6	2	—	—	—	—	—
1951–52	Providence Reds	AHL	35	20	28	48	16	—	—	—	—	—
1952–53	New York Rangers	NHL	60	12	13	25	29	—	—	—	—	—
1953–54	Cleveland Barons	AHL	66	23	34	57	43	5	0	0	0	0
1954–55	Providence Reds	AHL	58	13	16	29	15	—	—	—	—	—
1955–56	Trois-Rivières Lions	QSHL	27	5	13	18	19	—	—	—	—	—
1955–56	Owen Sound Mercurys	OHA Sr	6	4	3	7	4	6	2	2	4	6
1956–57	Owen Sound Mercurys	OHA Sr	52	15	28	43	56	—	—	—	—	—
1957–58	Kitchener-Waterloo Dutchmen	OHA Sr	32	10	16	26	22	—	—	—	—	—
1959–60	Chatham Maroons	OHA Sr	1	0	0	0	0	8	4	1	5	2
1959–60	Chatham Maroons	Al-Cup	—	—	—	—	—	12	3	5	8	2
1960–61	Woodstock Athletics	OHA Sr	—	14	17	31	22	—	—	—	—	—
1961–62	Woodstock Athletics	OHA Sr	18	0	2	2	0	—	—	—	—	—
AHL totals			404	156	169	325	169	28	6	7	13	8
NHL totals			80	16	15	31	31	—	—	—	—	—
