= Carlin's Iceland =

Former indoor artificial ice arena in Baltimore, Maryland

Coordinates: 39.325°N 76.663°W

Carlin's Iceland was an indoor artificial ice arena in Baltimore, Maryland, that was part of a city amusement park, known as Carlin's Park. It opened in December 1931, and was Baltimore's first indoor rink. The building was converted from a ballroom, to an ice surface measuring 85 × 120 ft (26 × 36.5 m), and seating for 1,200 people. In the first winter of operation, Iceland hosted school teams, before it was expanded for the following season. The Baltimore Orioles in the Eastern Amateur Hockey League played at Carlin's from 1932 to 1942. In its renovated setup, Iceland held 3,000 spectators, hosted annual winter carnivals, and once hosted a Sonja Henie show.

Subsequent hockey teams to play at Iceland include, the United States Coast Guard Cutters from 1942 to 1944, and the Baltimore Blades/Baltimore Clippers from 1944 to 1949 in the EAHL, and a revived Baltimore Clippers team from 1954 to 1956, in the EHL. Carlin's Iceland burned down on January 23, 1956, when an explosion ignited the building, causing an estimated $175,000 in damages. Baltimore had 12 games remaining in its schedule at the time.
