= Charlotte Checkers (1956–1977) =

American minor league professional ice hockey team (1956–1977)

- City: Charlotte, North Carolina
- League: EHL (1954–1973); SHL (1973–1977)
- Operated: 1954–1977
- Home arena: Charlotte Coliseum
- Colors: Blue, white, crimson
- Affiliates: NHL 1968–1977; WHA 1974–1977

Franchise history
- 1954–1956: Baltimore Clippers
- 1956: Charlotte Rebels
- 1956–1960: Charlotte Clippers
- 1960–1977: Charlotte Checkers

Championships
- Playoff championships: EHL: 3 (1957, 1971, 1972); SHL: 2(1975, 1976)

The Charlotte Checkers were a minor league professional ice hockey team based in Charlotte, North Carolina. The team began as the Baltimore Clippers in 1954, playing in the Eastern Hockey League. When the arena in Baltimore burned down midseason, the team moved to the Charlotte Coliseum as the Charlotte Rebels. The team remained and became the Charlotte Clippers in the following season. The Clippers were renamed the Checkers in 1960, transferred to the Southern Hockey League in 1973, then folded in 1977. The Clippers/Checkers franchise won five playoff championships (three in the EHL, two in the SHL), and were the first team to be based in the Southeast United States.

== Baltimore Clippers, 1954–1956 ==
Baltimore Clippers logo in the EHL. (1954–1956)

The Baltimore Clippers began play in the Eastern Hockey League during the 1954–55 season, with Andy Brown as coach. Herve Lalonde led the team, scoring 22 goals, and 50 assists, winning the John Carlin Trophy, as the league's top scorer. In the playoffs, Baltimore defeated the Clinton Comets 3 games to 1 in the first round, but lost the finals in four straight games to the Washington Lions. On January 23, 1956, midway through the Clippers' second season, their home arena, Carlin's Iceland, burned down.

== Charlotte Rebels, 1956 ==
Without an arena, the Clippers searched for a temporary home to finish the season. Local businessmen in Charlotte offered the one-year-old Charlotte Coliseum as a temporary site. The Baltimore Clippers played six of their remaining 12 games in Charlotte, using the name Rebels. The first professional hockey game in Charlotte was played on January 30, 1956, attended by 10,363 fans, with approximately 3,000 more unable to find a ticket. The Rebels lost the game 6–2, to the New Haven Blades. The six games played in Charlotte by the Rebels drew more than 40,000 fans. By comparison, the Clippers typically drew 2,000 fans per game in Baltimore. The combined record of the Clippers and Rebels was 47 points for fifth place, missing the playoffs.

== Charlotte Clippers, 1956–1960 ==
Charlotte Clippers logo (1956–1960)

Buoyed by the Rebels' strong attendance figures in Charlotte, owner Charles Rock chose to move the team there full-time for the following season as the Charlotte Clippers. They thus became the first professional hockey team based in the Southeast; six more Southern teams would join the EHL in the next 15 years.

In the 1956–57 season, their first full season in Charlotte, the Clippers earned 101 points, and won the Walker Cup for the league's best record. At the time, this was the highest point total in EHL history. The "Dixie Dandies," as they were nicknamed, won 21 consecutive home games going into the playoffs. Al O'Hearn lead the league in scoring with 46 goals, 71 assists, and 117 points, to win the John Carlin Trophy. In the playoffs, Charlotte defeated the New Haven Blades in six games in the first round, and defeated the Philadelphia Ramblers in seven games, to win the Atlantic City Boardwalk Trophy as playoff champions.

In the 1957–58 season, Charlotte dropped to 77 points, but still finished with the league's best record and a second Walker Cup. In the playoffs, Charlotte defeated the New Haven Blades in seven games in the first round, but lost in the finals to the Washington Presidents in seven games.

In the 1958–59 season, Charlotte dropped to sixth place, and missed the playoffs. The team also ran into financial troubles, which led to the Charlotte Coliseum Authority taking over the team in 1959. A citizen's group raised $25,000 from stockholders, to keep the team on the ice.

In the 1959–60 season, coach Andy Brown moved on, and the EHL split into northern and southern divisions. Evel Knievel tried out with the Clippers in 1959, but decided that a traveling team was not for him. Pete Horeck led the team as a player-coach, the Clippers finished second place in the south, won the first round playoff series in three games versus the Greensboro Generals, and lost to the Johnstown Jets in the second round.

== Charlotte Checkers ==
=== Eastern Hockey League, 1960–1973 ===
Charlotte Checkers logo (1960–1968)

The team was renamed the Charlotte Checkers, resulting from a name-the-team contest. Gordon Tottle became the player-coach, and despite the new name, Charlotte finished fourth place and missed the playoffs in the 1960–61 season. Joe Crozier was named coach in the 1961–62 season, but the team still finished fourth place and missed the playoffs. He returned for the 1962–63 season, and the Checkers placed third in the southern division. In the playoffs, Charlotte upset the second place Knoxville Knights in five games, then lost in five games to the Greensboro Generals in the second round. Turk Broda took over the coaching duties for the 1963–64 season, and led the team to a fourth-place finish in the south, and a first round playoff loss to Greensboro in three games.

Fred Creighton was brought in to coach for the 1964–65 season, beginning eight years at the helm of the Checkers. He improved the team to third place in the south, but the team still lost in the first round to the Nashville Dixie Flyers in three games. Creighton improved the team to 42 wins in the 1965–66 season, and second place in the south. In the playoffs, Charlotte defeated Greensboro in five games in the first round, then lost in four games straight to Nashville in the second round. Charlotte repeated a second-place finish in the 1966–67 season, then defeated Greensboro in three games in the first round of the playoffs, but lost to Nashville in five games in the second round. The Checkers won 42 games, and earned 93 points in the 1967–68 season, and finished second place in the south. Charlotte defeated Nashville in four games in the first round of the playoffs, and defeated Greensboro in six games in the second round. In the finals, the Checkers were swept in four games by the Clinton Comets.

Charlotte Checkers logo in Toronto Maple Leafs colors (1968–1971)

Charlotte dropped to third place in the 1968–69 season, after many players moved up to higher leagues. The rebuilding effort was made easier by this being first season of an affiliation with the Toronto Maple Leafs. In the playoffs, Charlotte lost in three games to Nashville. The Checkers repeated a third-place finish in the 1969–70 season. Center Tom Trevelyan was named EHL Rookie of the Year for the south division. In the playoffs, Charlotte defeated the Salem Rebels in five games in the first round, then lost to Greensboro in six games in the second round. Creighton led Charlotte to its best results in the 1970–71 season, with 55 wins, and 117 points to finish first overall in the EHL, and win the Walker Cup. Goaltender John Voss led the league in goals against average, and won the George L. Davis Jr. Trophy. In the playoffs, Charlotte defeated Nashville, then Greensboro both in four games, to reach the finals. The Checkers won the Atlantic City Boardwalk Trophy in five games over the New Haven Blades.

In the 1971–72 season, Charlotte switched affiliations to the Buffalo Sabres. Defenceman Don Brennan was voted the EHL Rookie of the Year for the south division, and goaltender Gaye Cooley led the league in goals against average to win the George L. Davis Jr. Trophy. The Checkers repeated the first-place finish and the Walker Cup in the regular season, with 47 wins and 102 points. In the playoffs, Charlotte defeated the St. Petersburg Suns in six games in the first round, and Greensboro in five games in the second round. Creighton and the Checkers won a second consecutive Atlantic City Boardwalk Trophy, defeating the Syracuse Blazers in four games in the finals. Creighton and many players moved on after the two championships, and Charlotte struggled in the 1972–73 season. Jack Wells was named player-coach, and the team finished fourth place in the south, missing the playoffs.

=== Southern Hockey League, 1973–1977 ===
The four teams in the EHL's Southern Division, including the Checkers, broke away to form the Southern Hockey League (SHL) in 1973. In the new league, Patrick J. Kelly took over coaching duties in all four seasons. Garry Swain led the SHL in scoring with 98 points. Charlotte finished second in the 1973–74 season and defeated Greensboro in six games in the first round of the playoffs, but lost the finals in seven games to the Roanoke Valley Rebels.

In the 1974–75 season, Charlotte began secondary affiliations with World Hockey Association teams, and the California Golden Seals, in addition to the existing agreement with Buffalo. Steve Hull led the SHL in scoring with 114 points. The Checkers finished with 101 points for the best record in the league. In the playoffs, they defeated defending champion Roanoke in four games in the first round, and defeated the Hampton Gulls in six games in the finals to win the Crockett Cup.

In the 1975–76 season, Charlotte earned 94 points, and had the league's best regular season record for the second consecutive season. Yvon Dupuis led the SHL with 52 goals scored. In the playoffs, Charlotte defeated Roanoke in six games in the first round to reach the finals for the third time. They won a second Crockett Cup in five games over Hampton. This was not enough to prevent the syndicate that owned the team from pulling out of the league. In July, a group led by car dealer and former Ford Motor Company executive Gar Laux stepped forward to acquire the franchise.

The 1976–77 season was cut short when the SHL folded due to financial issues. The final Checkers game was played on January 30, 1977 against the revived Baltimore Clippers. Charlotte was in third place at that time, and folded along with the league. Gar Laux wanted a team for the 1977–78 season, but there was no league to join.

Professional hockey returned to Charlotte in 1993, when an East Coast Hockey League expansion team began play as the Charlotte Checkers.

== Major league affiliations ==
The Charlotte Checkers were affiliated with National Hockey League teams from 1968 to 1977, and several World Hockey Association teams from 1974 to 1977.

Years	Parent club
1968–1971	Toronto Maple Leafs
1971–1977	Buffalo Sabres
1974–1975	California Golden Seals, Vancouver Blazers
1975–1976	Calgary Cowboys
1976–1977	Birmingham Bulls, Winnipeg Jets

== Coaches ==
Coaches from 1954 to 1977.

† denotes a player/coach

Coach	Years	Seasons	Games	Won	Lost	Tied
Andy Brown	1954–59	5	239	119	114	6
Pete Horeck†	1959–60	1	64	31	29	4
Gordon Tottle†	1960–61	1	64	25	34	5
Joe Crozier	1961–63	2	136	61	71	4
Turk Broda	1963–64	1	72	30	41	1
Fred Creighton	1964–72	8	581	328	209	44
Jack Wells†	1972–73	1	76	26	40	10
Patrick J. Kelly	1973–77	4	233	146	75	12

== Records ==
Top scorers from 1956 to 1977.

Rank	Player	Years	Seasons	Games	Goals	Assists	Points
1	Maurice Savard	1959–68	9	568	303	452	755
1	Jim McNulty	1956–67	11	620	346	429	755
3	Frank Golembrosky	1968–76	8	337	157	257	414
4	Barry Burnett	1968–77	9	504	77	262	339
5	Jack Wells	1968–77	9	389	117	213	330

== Notable players ==
List of notable players for the Baltimore Clippers/Charlotte Rebels (1954–1956), Charlotte Clippers (1956–1960) and Charlotte Checkers (1960–1977)

- Doug Adam
- Red Armstrong
- Michel Belhumeur
- Gilles Bilodeau
- Yvon Bilodeau
- Les Binkley
- Bob Blanchet
- Dan Brady
- Gary Bromley
- Ross Brooks
- John Brophy
- Cummy Burton
- Alain Caron
- Jacques Caron
- Tony Cassolato
- Gaye Cooley
- Michel Cormier
- Normand Cournoyer
- Paul Crowley
- Bob D'Alvise
- Norm Defelice
- André Deschamps
- Bob Dobek
- Rick Foley
- Gerard Gibbons
- Dave Gilmour
- Bob Girard
- Dave Given
- Frank Golembrosky
- John Gould
- Bob Graham
- Rich Hart
- Paul Heaver
- Gordon Henry
- Greg Hickey
- Ken Hicks
- André Hinse
- Mike Hobin
- Pete Horeck
- Steve Hull
- Ed Humphreys
- Ron Hutchinson
- Bill Johansen
- Rick Jodzio
- Mike Keeler
- Jean Landry
- Jack LeClair
- Jack Martin
- Terry Martin
- Gerry McNamara
- Jim McNulty
- Gord McRae
- Perry Miller
- Wayne Morrin
- Bob Mowat
- John Muckler
- Randy Murray
- Tim O'Connell
- Dan Olesevich
- Jean-Luc Phaneuf
- Gregg Pilling
- Tom Polanic
- Tim Regan
- Bob Richer
- Lorne Rombough
- Michel Rouleau
- Blaine Rydman
- Bob Sauvé
- Wayne Schaab
- Derek Smith
- Chuck Stuart
- Daniel Sullivan
- Garry Swain
- Dave Tataryn
- Gord Titcomb
- Gordon Tottle
- Tom Trevelyan
- Willie Trognitz
- John Van Horlick
- Gilles Villemure
- John Voss
- Clare Wakshinski
- Bob Whidden
- Hal Willis
- Lynn Zimmerman

== Results ==
Combined season-by-season record for:

- Baltimore Clippers (1954–55)
- Baltimore Clippers / Charlotte Rebels (1955–56)
- Charlotte Clippers (1956–1960)
- Charlotte Checkers (1960–1977)

Note: GP = Games played, W = Wins, L = Losses, T = Ties, Pts = Points, GF = Goals for, GA = Goals against

Season	League	GP	W	L	T	Pts	GF	GA	Standing	Playoffs
1954–55	EHL	47	22	23	2	46	208	180	3rd, EHL	Lost in finals
1955–56	EHL	64	23	40	1	47	236	327	5th, EHL	Did not qualify
1956–57	EHL	64	50	13	1	101	364	239	1st, EHL	Won championship
1957–58	EHL	64	38	25	1	77	275	243	1st, EHL	Lost in finals
1958–59	EHL	64	24	38	2	50	209	283	6th, EHL	Did not qualify
1959–60	EHL	64	31	29	4	66	243	244	2nd, Southern	Lost in first round
1960–61	EHL	64	25	34	5	55	221	265	4th, Southern	Did not qualify
1961–62	EHL	68	26	40	2	54	226	270	4th, Southern	Did not qualify
1962–63	EHL	68	35	31	2	72	242	264	3rd, Southern	Lost in second round
1963–64	EHL	72	30	41	1	61	276	304	4th, Southern	Lost in first round
1964–65	EHL	72	35	35	2	72	262	286	3rd, Southern	Lost in first round
1965–66	EHL	72	42	30	0	84	300	251	2nd, Southern	Lost in second round
1966–67	EHL	72	36	33	3	75	259	235	2nd, Southern	Lost in second round
1967–68	EHL	72	42	21	9	93	333	243	2nd, Southern	Lost in finals
1968–69	EHL	72	37	29	6	80	274	280	3rd, Southern	Lost in first round
1969–70	EHL	74	34	31	9	77	284	266	3rd, Southern	Lost in second round
1970–71	EHL	74	55	12	7	117	383	153	1st, Southern	Won championship
1971–72	EHL	73	47	18	8	102	330	180	1st, Southern	Won championship
1972–73	EHL	76	26	40	10	62	241	313	4th, Southern	Did not qualify
1973–74	SHL	72	44	27	1	89	309	227	2nd, SHL	Lost in finals
1974–75	SHL	72	50	21	1	101	370	256	1st, SHL	Won championship
1975–76	SHL	72	42	20	10	94	302	206	1st, SHL	Won championship
1976–77	SHL	50	22	25	3	47	180	186	3rd, SHL	League folded
TOTALS	EHL	1296	658	563	75	1391	5166	4826	4 division titles	3 championships 3 finalists
TOTALS	SHL	266	158	93	15	331	1161	875	2 division titles	2 championships 1 finalist
