= Jack Dyte =

Canadian ice hockey player

- Born: October 13, 1918 New Liskeard, Ontario, Canada
- Died: April 9, 1974 (aged 55) Orillia, Ontario, Canada
- Height: 6 ft 0 in (183 cm)
- Weight: 190 lb (86 kg; 13 st 8 lb)
- Position: Defence
- Shot: Left
- Played for: Chicago Black Hawks
- Playing career: 1938–1949

John Leonard Douglas Haig Dyte (October 13, 1918 – April 9, 1974) was a Canadian ice hockey defenceman who played 27 games in the National Hockey League for the Chicago Black Hawks during the 1943–44 season. The rest of his career, which lasted from 1938 to 1949, was spent in the minor leagues

== Career ==
Dyte played his junior hockey with the Barrie Colts of the Ontario Hockey League and spent one season with the Niagara Falls Cataracts of the OHA Senior A League. After three seasons in the Eastern Hockey League, where Dyte was named to the EAHL All-Star Team in consecutive years (2nd team in 1940, 1st team in 1941), and a season with the Montreal Royals, Dyte signed a free agent contract with the Chicago Blackhawks. He played 27 games with the Black Hawks, scoring one goal.

Dyte finished his career playing in the AHL from 1943 until 1946 and would continue to play semi-professional hockey until his retirement after the 1948–49 season.

== Career statistics ==
=== Regular season and playoffs ===
			Regular season					Playoffs
Season	Team	League	GP	G	A	Pts	PIM	GP	G	A	Pts	PIM
1937–38	Barrie Colts	OHA	—	—	—	—	—	—	—	—	—	—
1938–39	Niagara Falls Cataracts	OHA Sr	20	3	3	6	31	—	—	—	—	—
1939–40	Baltimore Orioles	EAHL	57	8	18	26	57	9	0	2	2	6
1940–41	Baltimore Orioles	EAHL	64	15	16	31	68	—	—	—	—	—
1941–42	Johnstown Blue Birds	EAHL	60	15	21	36	88	7	4	4	8	8
1942–43	Montreal Royals	QSHL	13	1	1	2	20	—	—	—	—	—
1943–44	Chicago Black Hawks	NHL	27	1	0	1	31	—	—	—	—	—
1943–44	Providence Reds	AHL	7	0	0	0	6	—	—	—	—	—
1943–44	Buffalo Bisons	AHL	15	0	1	1	10	9	0	0	0	2
1944–45	Buffalo Bisons	AHL	52	2	8	10	56	6	0	0	0	2
1945–46	St. Louis Flyers	AHL	60	1	6	7	67	—	—	—	—	—
1946–47	New Liskeard Pioneers	OVHL	—	—	—	—	—	—	—	—	—	—
1947–48	New Liskeard Pioneers	OVHL	—	—	—	—	—	—	—	—	—	—
1948–49	North Sydney Victorias	CBSHL	58	6	18	24	65	6	3	1	4	4
AHL totals			134	3	15	18	139	15	0	0	0	4
EAHL totals			181	38	55	93	213	16	4	6	10	14
NHL totals			27	1	0	1	31	—	—	—	—	—
