= Baltimore Clippers (1945–1949) =

Minor league professional ice hockey team in Maryland, US

- City: Baltimore, Maryland
- League: Eastern Amateur Hockey League
- Operated: 1945–1949
- Home arena: Carlin's Iceland
- Owner(s): Jacobs brothers
- Affiliate: Buffalo Bisons (1944–45)

Franchise history
- 1944–1945: Baltimore Blades
- 1945–1949: Baltimore Clippers

Championships
- Regular season titles: 1 (1947–48)

The Baltimore Clippers were a minor league professional ice hockey team from in Baltimore, Maryland, playing in the Eastern Amateur Hockey League at Carlin's Iceland. The team began play in the 1944–45 season known as the Baltimore Blades, and were renamed the Clippers from 1946 to 1949. The team name paid homage to local history in the Baltimore Clipper, and the Port of Baltimore. The Clippers ceased operations during the 1949–50 season.

== History ==
The Baltimore Blades were founded in 1944 by the Jacobs brothers, who owned a military uniform supply company. The Blades replaced the void in the EAHL when the United States Coast Guard Cutters hockey team disbanded. Baltimore was affiliated with the Buffalo Bisons in the American Hockey League. Eddie Shore coached the parent team, and was also the Blades' general manager. Former Bison player Leroy Goldsworthy coached the Blades to a second-place finish in the EAHL.

In the 1945–46 season, the team changed names to the Clippers, and the affiliation with Buffalo ended. Baltimore finished the season fourth in the EAHL, and went through three head coaches, including Jim Foley, Herb Mitchell, and player-coach Jack Riley. In the 1946–47 season, Hank Roy was named head coach, but was replaced with the returning Goldsworthy as Baltimore again finished fourth in the EAHL.

Frank Beisler was named the new head coach and manager for the 1947–48 season. Beisler led the team to 31 wins and finished first place in the league, winning the Walker Cup. Right winger Charlie Knox led the league with 54 goals, and 86 points; center Dave Maguire led the league with 53 assists, and defender Jack Nixon led the league with 182 penalty minutes in 37 games.

The EAHL did not operate for the 1948–49 season, but resumed play for the 1949–50 season. Kilby MacDonald was named the head coach and team manager. After twelve games, the Clippers had four wins, and withdrew from league play on December 4, 1949.

== Players ==
Notable league executive Jack Riley played for the Clippers from 1945 to 1946. Two Blades players, and seven Clippers players also played in the National Hockey League. Notable players include:

- Hugh Currie
- Norm Dussault
- Gordie Haworth
- Gordon Henry
- Rosario Joannette
- Ray Powell
- Jack Riley
- Stan Smrke
- Jack Stoddard
- Chick Webster

== Results ==
Season-by-season results.

Season	Team	GP	W	L	T	Pts	Pct	GF	GA	Standing
1944–45	Blades	48	28	19	1	57	0.594	228	177	2nd, EAHL
1945–46	Clippers	52	19	25	8	46	0.442	164	205	4th, EAHL
1946–47	Clippers	56	18	30	8	44	0.393	203	253	4th, EAHL
1947–48	Clippers	48	31	16	1	63	0.656	246	154	1st, EAHL
1948–49	Clippers	EAHL did not operate								
1949–50	Clippers	12	4	8	0	8	0.333	29	42	withdrew
