= Red Anderson =

Red Anderson may refer to:

- Jerry Anderson (American football coach) (born 1945), former college football coach
- Red Anderson (baseball) (1912–1972), former professional baseball player
- Red Anderson (ice hockey) (1912–1991), former ice hockey player
