= Johnstown Blue Birds =

- City: Johnstown, Pennsylvania, United States
- League: EAHL 1941-42
- Operated: 1941-42
- Home arena: Shaffer Ice Arena
- Owner: Bill "Pick" Hines
- Head coach: Bill "Pick" Hines
- Affiliates: none

Championships
- Regular season titles: EHL (1)(1941-42)

The Johnstown Blue Birds were a professional ice hockey team from Johnstown, Pennsylvania. The Blue Birds played one season in the former Eastern Hockey League before folding after the 1941-42 season.

== History ==
=== Shaffer Ice Palace ===
The Shaffer Ice Company was Johnstown's largest distributor of ice in the city prior to the 1930s. But because of the invention of electric refrigeration, it virtually made Shaffer's ice selling business extinct. However, because of Shaffer's expertise in the ice making business, he used his McMillen Street building to make an indoor ice skating rink. The building would be re-opened as the Shaffer Ice Palace and would offer public skating and ice skating lessons.

=== Ownership ===
In the fall of 1941, the Ice Palace hosted a game between Pitt and Penn State. Neither team had an official college team, but the Palace was filled to capacity and sold over 1100 tickets. In the stands that day was Toronto native Bill "Pick" Hines. Hines had always dreamed of owning a hockey team. After a good day at Pimlico, where he hit on a long shot, Hines applied for an EHL franchise in Baltimore. Because of lack of publicity, the EHL's Baltimore Orioles were a poor draw. With the Orioles struggling, Hines went to the league offices and asked for their permission to move the team to Johnstown. The league approve the move and Hines moved his team to Johnstown, where they would play their games at the Shaffer Ice Palace

=== 1941-42 EHL Season ===
The Blue Birds played their home games at the Shaffer Ice Palace in the Hornerstown section of Johnstown Although the team on the ice was successful, Hines had financial problems with the team. When Hines originally saw the exhibition, he saw capacity crowds. What he didn't know was that Johnstown's Memorial Hospital Junior Auxiliary club was responsible for the sellout, having sold many of the tickets as a fundraiser.

With only fourteen games into the EAHL season, Hines revealed to the league that he had not paid his players in over two weeks. The team almost folded, but a Johnstown resident helped pull the team from debt using his own money. Harry Crichton, who was from New Jersey but at the time was the Vice President of Sale for the Johnstown Coal & Coke Company and had family who lived in the city, drove to New York in an effort to save the team. He walked into Madison Square Garden, which at the time housed EHL president Tom Lockhart's office, and paid him $2,000 cash to save the team. Hines wrote off his losses and returned to Toronto. Henry "Hank" Dyck, the high-scoring center of the Blue Birds, stepped up and assumed the role of interim coach for the remainder of the season. Attendance eventually picked up and all played were fully paid by the end of the season. The Blue Birds would finish the season in a three-way tie for first place. Johnstown, the Boston Olympics, and the New York Rovers tied for first place in the Eastern League, but New York won the tiebreaker by scoring more goals. The Blue Birds brought in approximately 25,000 fans throughout the season, highlighted by one game that brought in 1,527 fans through the gates. By one account, it was "about all the rink could hold." Goaltender Frank Ceryance was named outstanding player of the league at the conclusion of the season.

The Shaffer Ice Palace was converted to a manufacturing plant for assist in the production needed for World War II, leaving the Blue Birds without a home. Johnstown would not see another professional hockey team until 1950, when Johnstown returned to the Eastern Hockey League as the Johnstown Jets.

The Johnstown Chiefs paid homage to the Blue Birds during the 2007 season by wearing throwback hockey jerseys bearing the Blue Birds logo. The game was played on November 10, 2007 against the Reading Royals.

== Season-by-season results ==
Season	League	Games	Won	Lost	Tied	Points	Winning %	Goals for	Goals against	Standing	Coach
1941–42	EHL	60	34	20	6	74	0.617	248	215	t-1st, EHL	Bill "Pick" Hines/Henry "Hank" Dyck

== NHL alumni ==
List of Johnstown Blue Birds who played in the National Hockey League, 3 in total.

- Bill "Red" Anderson
- Henry Dyck
- Jack Dyte
