= Harrisburg, North Carolina =

- Town
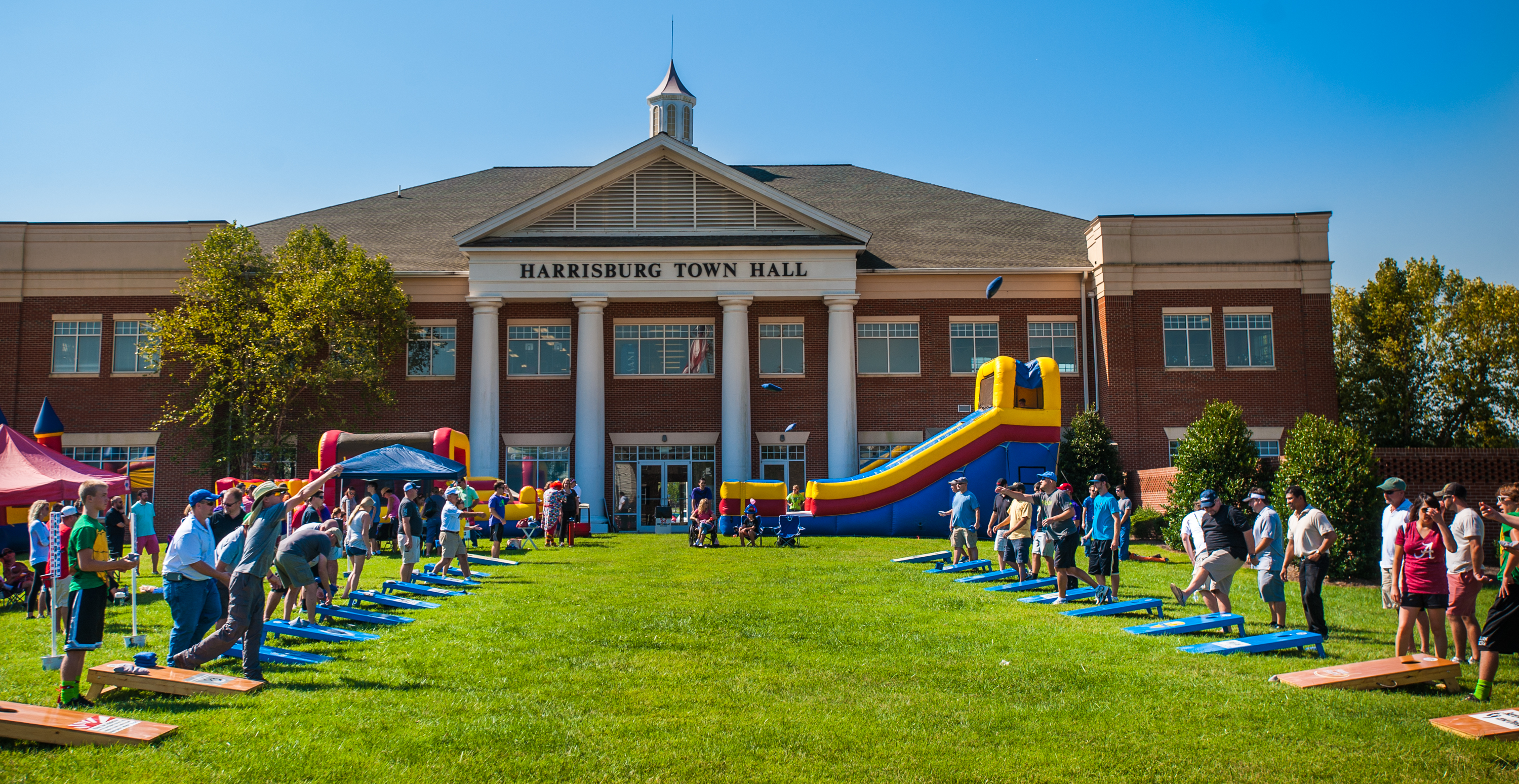
- Harrisburg Town Hall

- Flag Seal
- Motto: "The right side of opportunity"
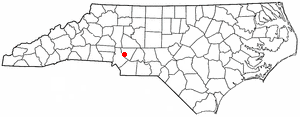
- Location of Harrisburg, North Carolina
- Coordinates: 35°19′04″N 80°39′06″W
- Country: United States
- State: North Carolina
- County: Cabarrus
- Settled: 1732–1765
- Incorporated: 1973

Government
  - Mayor: Jennifer Teague

Area
  - Total: 11.47 sq mi (29.70 km^{2})
  - Land: 11.47 sq mi (29.70 km^{2})
  - Water: 0 sq mi (0.00 km^{2})
- Elevation: 640 ft (200 m)

Population (2020)
  - Total: 18,967
  - Density: 1,653.8/sq mi (638.55/km^{2})
- Time zone: UTC−5 (Eastern (EST))
  - Summer (DST): UTC−4 (EDT)
- ZIP code: 28075
- Area codes: 704, 980
- FIPS code: 37-29800
- GNIS feature ID: 2406649
- Website: www.harrisburgnc.gov

Harrisburg is a town in Cabarrus County, North Carolina, United States. It is a northeastern suburb of Charlotte. In the 2020 census, the population was 18,967.

== Geography ==
Harrisburg is located in southwestern Cabarrus County. It is bordered to the north by Concord and to the west by Charlotte in Mecklenburg County.

North Carolina Highway 49 passes through the center of Harrisburg, leading northeast 57 miles (92 km) to Asheboro and southwest 13 miles (21 km) to the center of Charlotte. Charlotte Motor Speedway is 3 miles (5 km) north of the center of town, within the Concord city limits.

Harrisburg has a total area of 11.15 square miles (28.9 km^{2}), all land. The town boasts 5.2 miles of greenway, with 23 more miles proposed.

== Demographics ==
Historical population
Census	Pop.	Note	%±
1980	1,433		—
1990	1,625		13.4%
2000	4,493		176.5%
2010	11,526		156.5%
2020	18,967		64.6%
2025 (est.)	20,742	▲	9.4%
U.S. Decennial Census

=== 2020 census ===
As of the 2020 census, Harrisburg had a population of 18,967. The median age was 38.6 years. 28.8% of residents were under the age of 18 and 12.0% were 65 years of age or older. For every 100 females there were 94.9 males, and for every 100 females age 18 and over there were 91.0 males age 18 and over.

99.8% of residents lived in urban areas, while 0.2% lived in rural areas.

There were 6,183 households in the town, including 4,164 families. Of all households, 48.8% had children under the age of 18 living in them. Of all households, 69.6% were married-couple households, 8.7% were households with a male householder and no spouse or partner present, and 18.8% were households with a female householder and no spouse or partner present. About 13.5% of all households were made up of individuals and 6.4% had someone living alone who was 65 years of age or older.

There were 6,374 housing units, of which 3.0% were vacant. The homeowner vacancy rate was 0.9% and the rental vacancy rate was 8.9%.

Harrisburg racial composition
Race	Number	Percentage
White (non-Hispanic)	10,606	55.92%
Black or African American (non-Hispanic)	3,701	19.51%
Native American	56	0.3%
Asian	2,579	13.6%
Pacific Islander	5	0.03%
Other/Mixed	883	4.66%
Hispanic or Latino	1,137	5.99%

=== Demographic estimates ===
At the 2017 census estimate, there were 3.16 persons per household in the town. The population percent change between April 1, 2010, and July 1, 2017, was 17.9%. There were 926 veterans.

In 2016, the median property value in Harrisburg was $245,400, and the homeownership rate was 89.1%. The national average was 63.6%. The median income for a household in the town was $88,865 and the per capita income was $32,310.

== Government ==
Harrisburg has a council–manager form of government. The Town Council is elected on a non-partisan basis every two years, and members serve staggered four-year terms with no term limits. The mayor is elected separately for a four-year term and is ex officio chair of the Town Council. The Town Council has eight members from the community and appoints a town manager to oversee day-to-day operations.

Harrisburg Town Council members
Name	Term
Erin Banks (mayor pro tem)	2025–2029
Altyn Cotell	2021–2029
Chris Faw	2023–2027
La'Trecia Glover	2023–2027
Ron Smith	2023–2027
Jennifer Teague (mayor)	2021–2029
Mike Thevenin	2023–2027
Lex Thomas	2025–2029

While the Town Council is responsible for passing ordinances, the town's budget, and other policies, all decisions can be overridden by the North Carolina General Assembly, since North Carolina municipalities do not have home rule. While municipal powers have been broadly construed since the 1960s, the General Assembly still retains considerable authority over local matters.

== Education ==
The percent of people over 25 with a high school diploma or higher was 95.6% and 44.0% for those with a bachelor's degree or higher. Local schools include Harrisburg Elementary School, Hickory Ridge Elementary School, Hickory Ridge Middle School and Hickory Ridge High School.

The largest universities by graduates near Harrisburg are, the University of North Carolina at Charlotte, Central Piedmont Community College and Rowan–Cabarrus Community College. The most common bachelor's degree concentrations are General Business Administration and Management, General Psychology and General Biological Studies.

== Notable people ==
- Austin McDaniel (born 1994), racing driver
- Gordon Tottle (1925– 1987), professional ice hockey player
