= Philadelphia Ramblers (EHL) =

American ice hockey team, 1955 to 1964

The Philadelphia Ramblers were a minor professional ice hockey team based in the Philadelphia Arena in Philadelphia, Pennsylvania. The Ramblers played for nine seasons in the Eastern Hockey League from 1955 to 1964. After the end of the 1963–64 season, the team relocated to Cherry Hill, New Jersey, and was renamed the Jersey Devils (not to be confused with the NHL team).

Former members of the EHL Ramblers included Ted Harris (1956–1958), future Toronto Maple Leafs coach John Brophy and goalie Ross Brooks, who was one of the oldest rookies in the NHL playing for the Boston Bruins in the early 1970s. Doug Adam both played and coached for the Ramblers. Unusually for the era, the team had a female general manager, namely Constance Williams.

Previously, another Philadelphia Ramblers team played in the American Hockey League from 1935 to 1941.

== Season-by-season results ==
Season	Games	Won	Lost	Tied	Points	Goals For	Goals Against
1955-56	64	23	41	0	46	246	301
1956-57	64	34	27	3	71	277	233
1957-58	64	30	31	3	63	210	211
1958-59	64	30	33	1	61	215	237
1959-60	64	31	30	3	65	226	219
1960-61	64	32	28	4	68	227	278
1961-62	68	28	38	2	58	265	341
1962-63	68	29	36	3	61	287	304
1963-64	72	21	44	7	49	261	374
