= Doug Adam =

Canadian ice hockey player, coach (1923–2001)

- Born: September 7, 1923 Toronto, Ontario, Canada
- Died: December 24, 2001 (aged 78)
- Height: 5 ft 11 in (180 cm)
- Weight: 165 lb (75 kg; 11 st 11 lb)
- Position: Left wing
- Shot: Left
- Played for: New York Rangers
- Playing career: 1942–1961

Douglas Patrick Adam (September 7, 1923 – December 24, 2001) was a Canadian professional ice hockey forward and coach. He spent most of his career, which lasted from 1942 to 1961, in the minor leagues, but did play four games in the National Hockey League for the New York Rangers during the 1949–50 season. He was born in Toronto, Ontario.

== Career ==
Adam was signed by the New York Rangers as a free agent in 1947, and played for various minor league affiliates of the Rangers until 1955. In February 1950, Adam played four games at the NHL level with the Rangers in 1949–50, wearing number 19. During those four games, he scored no goals, but earned one assist. After leaving the Rangers organization, Adam became a playing coach with the Philadelphia Ramblers in the EHL. After his playing career ended, Adam became a head coach with the Rochester Americans of the AHL in 1971-72, but was replaced mid-season by team member Don Cherry.

== Career statistics ==
=== Regular season and playoffs ===
			Regular season					Playoffs
Season	Team	League	GP	G	A	Pts	PIM	GP	G	A	Pts	PIM
1941–42	Toronto Marlboros	OHA	17	6	1	7	6	2	0	0	0	2
1941–42	Toronto HMCS York	TNDHL	3	1	2	3	0	6	2	3	5	6
1942–43	Toronto Army Daggers	OHA Sr	3	0	1	1	4	2	0	1	1	2
1944–45	Toronto Bowsers	TMHL	2	0	1	1	0	—	—	—	—	—
1944–45	Toronto Uptown Tires	TMHL	18	20	19	39	7	—	—	—	—	—
1944–45	Toronto Army Shamrocks	TIHL	2	0	2	2	0	—	—	—	—	—
1944–45	Toronto People's Credit	TIHL	—	—	—	—	—	3	1	3	4	0
1945–46	Toronto Dorsts	TMHL	3	2	3	5	4	—	—	—	—	—
1945–46	Hollywood Wolves	PCHL	10	0	4	4	8	9	2	0	2	0
1946–47	Toronto Credit Jewellers	TCSHL	28	27	16	43	14	5	1	3	4	13
1947–48	Tacoma Rockets	PCHL	57	34	25	59	57	5	6	1	7	4
1948–49	Tacoma Rockets	PCHL	68	24	30	54	45	6	5	1	6	4
1949–50	New York Rangers	NHL	4	0	1	1	0	—	—	—	—	—
1949–50	Tacoma Rockets	PCHL	63	53	26	79	68	5	3	2	5	6
1950–51	Tacoma Rockets	PCHL	68	31	19	50	68	6	2	0	2	4
1951–52	Tacoma Rockets	PCHL	53	31	26	57	43	6	0	0	0	0
1952–53	Tacoma Rockets	WHL	70	39	31	70	74	—	—	—	—	—
1953–54	Seattle Bombers	WHL	22	3	7	16	—	—	—	—	—
1953–54	Saskatoon Quakers	WHL	30	10	20	10	—	—	—	—	—
1953–54	Vancouver Canucks	WHL	11	7	11	4	12	4	1	5	12
1954–55	Vancouver Canucks	WHL	29	7	21	20	—	—	—	—	—
1954–55	New Westminster Royals	WHL	36	16	15	31	33	—	—	—	—	—
1955–56	New Westminster Royals	WHL	55	16	20	36	36	4	1	0	1	5
1956–57	Charlotte Clippers	EHL	63	65	49	114	46	13	11	7	18	16
1957–58	Charlotte Clippers	EHL	55	44	33	77	32	14	7	10	17	8
1958–59	Philadelphia Ramblers	EHL	64	39	38	77	66	6	5	4	9	4
1959–60	Philadelphia Ramblers	EHL	64	46	43	89	114	4	1	2	3	20
1959–60	Louisville Rebels	IHL	—	—	—	—	—	1	0	0	0	0
1960–61	Philadelphia Ramblers	EHL	41	16	23	39	24	3	1	0	1	2
PCHL/WHL totals			572	276	223	499	482	53	25	6	31	35
NHL totals			4	0	1	1	0	—	—	—	—	—

== Coaching statistics ==
				Regular season				Playoffs
Season	Team	League	Type	GC	W	L	T
1958–59	Philadelphia Ramblers	EHL	Player-Head	64	30	33	1	Lost in round 1
1959–60	Philadelphia Ramblers	EHL	Player-Head	64	31	30	3	Lost in round 1
1960–61	Philadelphia Ramblers	EHL	Player-Head	64	32	28	4
1971–72	Rochester Americans	AHL	Head coach	37	12	20	5
