= Cleveland Knights =

Ice hockey team in Cleveland, Ohio, US

- City: Cleveland, Ohio
- League: Eastern Amateur Hockey League
- Operated: 1949–1950
- Home arena: Cleveland Arena

The Cleveland Knights were a minor professional ice hockey team based in Cleveland, Ohio. The team played at the Cleveland Arena but lasted just 18 games before suspending operations during the only season of play.

== History ==
Shortly after the Cleveland Barons purchased the Cleveland Arena, the Cleveland Knights were founded as a new member of the Eastern Amateur Hockey League. The team began play in the fall of 1949 but immediately ran into difficulties. With the Barons being the primary draw at the Arena, few people showed up to watch the Knights games. Player/coach Louis Trudel led the team for 18 games but by the beginning of December the fate of the team had already been decided. Cleveland withdrew from the league on December 5 and the franchise was dissolved.

== Season-by-season record ==
Note: GP = Games played, W = Wins, L = Losses, T = Ties, Pts = Points, GF = Goals for, GA = Goals against

Season	GP	W	L	T	Pts	GF	GA	Finish	Coach	Playoffs
1949–50	18	4	10	4	12	70	92	withdrew	Louis Trudel	none
