= Bob Storey =

Canadian gridiron football player (born 1945)

Profile
- Position: Running back

Personal information
- Born: October 26, 1945 (age 81); Montreal, Quebec, Canada
- Listed height: 6 ft 1 in (1.85 m)
- Listed weight: 195 lb (88 kg)

Career information
- College: University of Tulsa

Career history
- 1967–68: Hamilton Tiger-Cats
- 1969–70: Montreal Alouettes

Awards and highlights
- 2× Grey Cup champion (1967, 70)

Bob Storey (born 26 October 1945) is a former offensive and defensive back, and kick returner, who played four seasons in the Canadian Football League (CFL), winning 2 Grey Cups. He played 2 seasons and 28 games for the Hamilton Tiger-Cats, winning a Cup in 1967, and 2 seasons and 27 games for the Montreal Alouettes, winning another cup in 1970.

His father was Red Storey, famed Canadian football player (and Grey Cup champion) and sportsman.
