= Don Webster (ice hockey) =

Canadian ice hockey player

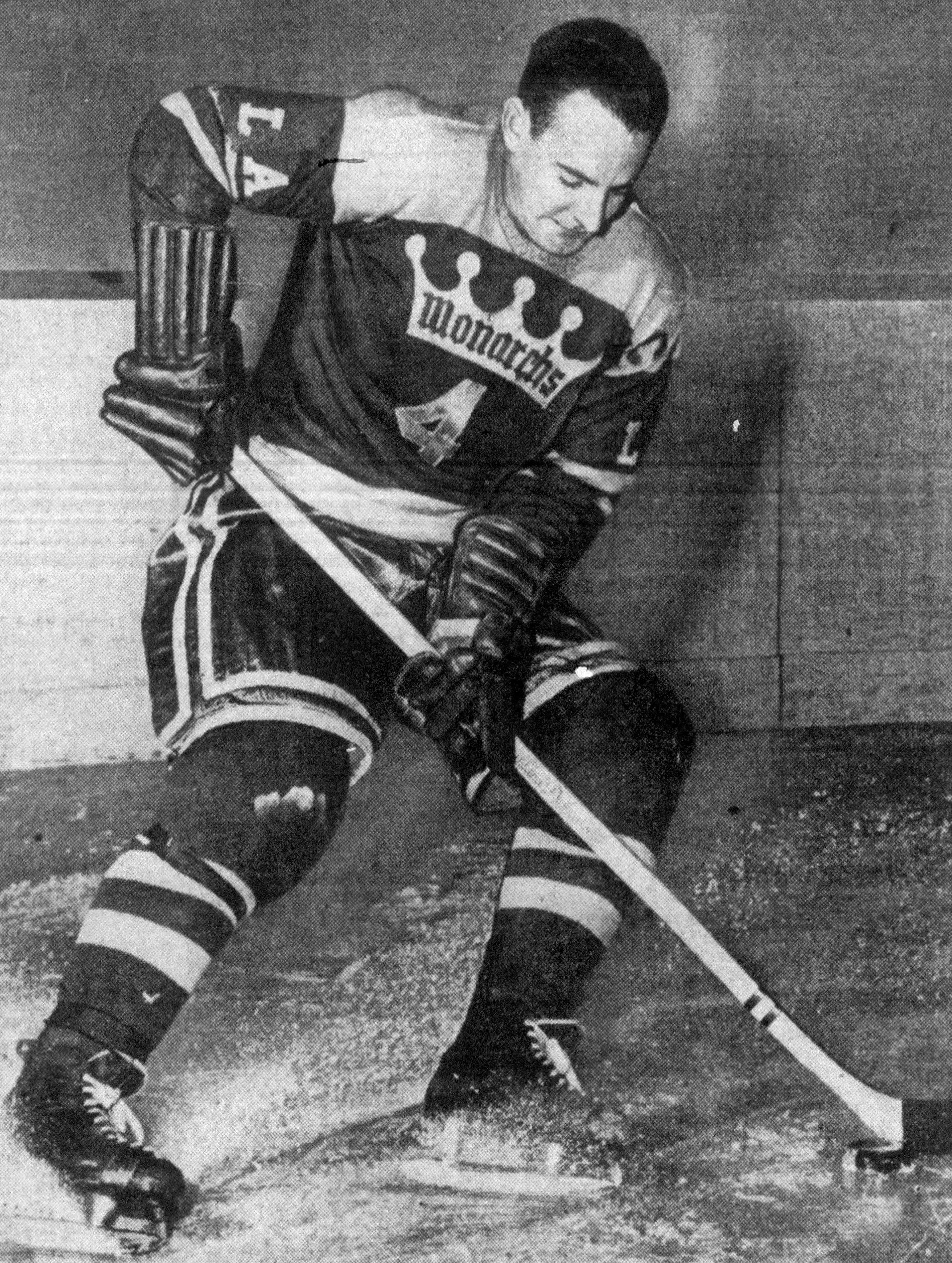
- Webster, circa 1950
- Born: July 3, 1924; Toronto, Ontario, Canada
- Died: April 12, 1978 (aged 53); Fresno, California, U.S.
- Height: 5 ft 8 in (173 cm)
- Weight: 170 lb (77 kg; 12 st 2 lb)
- Position: Left wing
- Shot: Left
- Played for: Toronto Maple Leafs
- Playing career: 1942–1953

Donald Walter Webster (July 3, 1924 – April 12, 1978) was a Canadian professional ice hockey player who played 27 games in the National Hockey League with the Toronto Maple Leafs during the 1943–44 season. The rest of his career, which lasted from 1942 to 1953, was spent in various minor leagues. Webster was born in Toronto, Ontario, and his older brother of Chick, also played in the NHL.

Following his playing career, Webster began a television career in various station management roles in central California, and was instrumental as a league official and referee in the Cal-Neva Hockey League, the precursor to the Pacific Southwest Hockey League.

== Career statistics ==
=== Regular season and playoffs ===
			Regular season					Playoffs
Season	Team	League	GP	G	A	Pts	PIM	GP	G	A	Pts	PIM
1940–41	Etobicoke Indians	MGT	10	10	6	16	21	6	4	1	5	27
1940–41	Toronto Stockyards	TIHL	10	2	2	4	42	6	2	1	3	2
1941–42	Toronto Marlboros	OHA	18	6	6	12	47	2	0	2	2	6
1941–42	Toronto People's Credit	TIHL	6	1	0	1	12	1	0	0	0	0
1942–43	Providence Reds	AHL	48	11	19	30	67	2	0	0	0	2
1943–44	Toronto Maple Leafs	NHL	27	7	6	13	28	5	0	0	0	12
1944–45	Buffalo Bisons	AHL	39	4	13	17	57	—	—	—	—	—
1944–45	Hershey Bears	AHL	9	1	1	2	4	—	—	—	—	—
1945–46	Hershey Bears	AHL	5	1	3	4	4	—	—	—	—	—
1945–46	Fort Worth Rangers	USHL	4	0	0	0	2	—	—	—	—	—
1945–46	Shawinigan Falls Cataractes	QSHL	9	2	2	4	8	—	—	—	—	—
1945–46	Washington Lions	EAHL	27	5	7	12	49	11	4	2	6	4
1946–47	San Diego Skyhawks	PCHL	60	6	19	28	114	2	0	0	0	2
1947–48	Springfield Indians	AHL	17	1	2	3	24	—	—	—	—	—
1947–48	Tulsa Oilers	USHL	46	9	19	28	80	2	1	0	1	4
1948–49	Tulsa Oilers	USHL	52	7	11	18	137	7	0	3	3	4
1949–50	Los Angeles Monarchs	PCHL	57	1	13	14	187	17	3	2	5	52
1950–51	Vancouver Canucks	PCHL	64	2	18	20	145	12	0	0	0	41
1952–53	Vancouver Canucks	WHL	66	0	15	15	123	—	—	—	—	—
PCHL totals			181	12	50	62	446	31	3	2	5	95
NHL totals			27	7	6	13	28	5	0	0	0	12
