= Troy Uncle Sam's Trojans =

Former professional minor league ice hockey team in Troy, New York

- City: Troy, New York
- League: Eastern Amateur Hockey League
- Operated: 1952–1953
- Home arena: RPI Field House
- Colors: Red, white, blue

Championships
- Regular season titles: 0

The Troy Uncle Sam's Trojans were a minor-league professional ice hockey team who competed in the Eastern Amateur Hockey League (EAHL) in the 1952-53 season.

Based out of Troy, New York, the Trojans were coached by player-coach Bill Moe, and led by Art Stone, who scored 52 goals and added 55 assists for a league-leading 107 points. They also featured future Toronto Maple Leafs head coach John Brophy and future New York Rangers player Vic Howe, the brother of Gordie Howe. Wilf Field served as the president and general manager of the team.

The unique nickname was an amalgamation of Troy native Samuel Wilson's famous moniker "Uncle Sam", and "Trojans", the demonym for residents of Troy. The use of Uncle Sam in the name was suggested by the wife of the managing director of the RPI Field House, who had been called into work on the Fourth of July to record the results of early negotiations regarding the use of the venue as the team's home rink. The team's colors were red, white, and blue.

They finished 23-34-3, last in the five-team league. The EAHL did not operate the following season due to a lack of teams.
