= Atlantic City Seagulls (TSHL) =

- City: Atlantic City, New Jersey
- League: Tri-State Hockey League (1932–1933); Eastern Amateur Hockey League (1933–1942)
- Operated: 1930–1942
- Home arena: Boardwalk Hall
- Colors: Black, white, teal

Franchise history
- 1930–1942: Atlantic City Seagulls
- 1942–1946: Philadelphia Falcons
- 1946–1949: Philadelphia Rockets

Championships
- Playoff championships: 1933

The Atlantic City Seagulls were a minor professional ice hockey team based in Atlantic City, New Jersey. The team played at the Boardwalk Hall and moved to Philadelphia in 1942.

== History ==
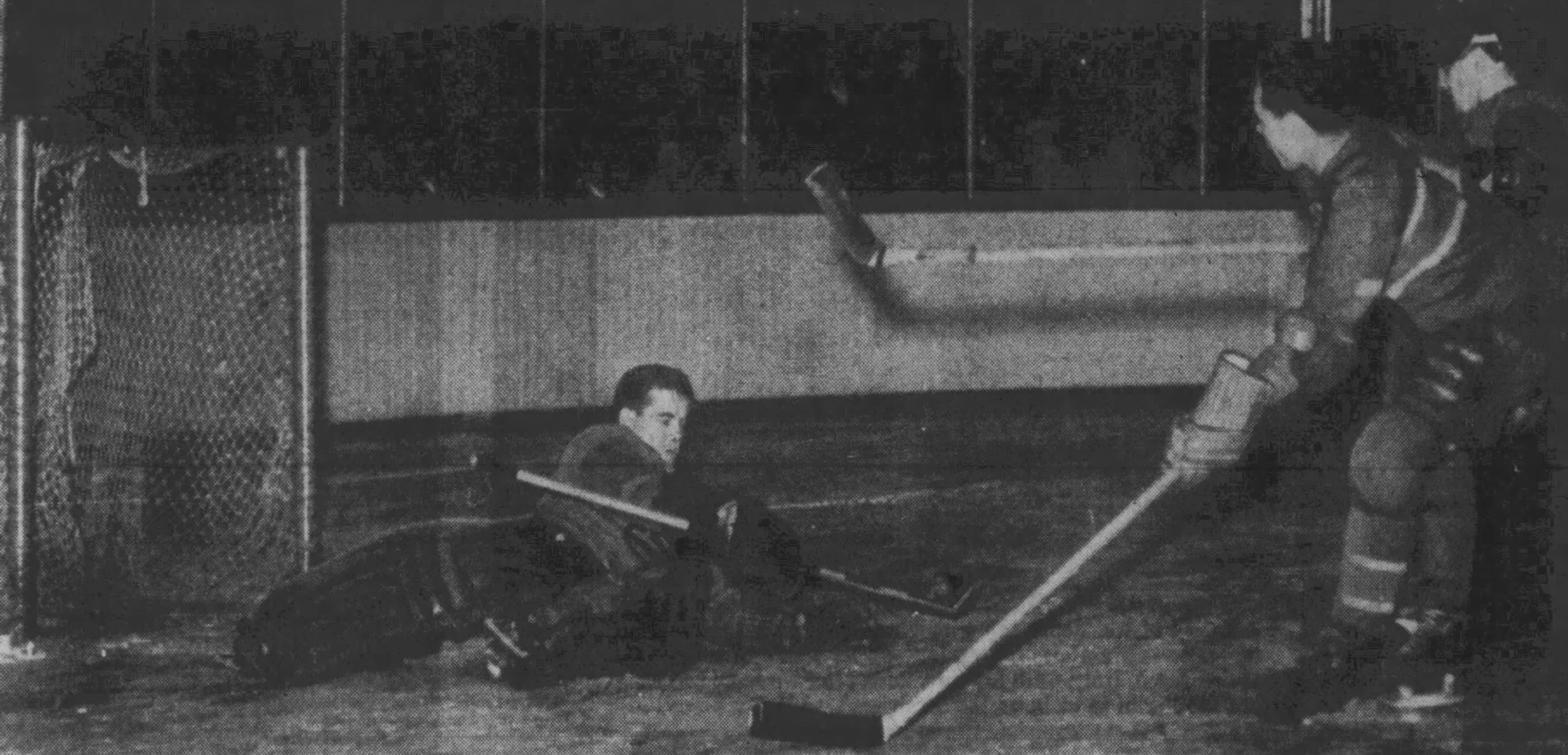
Baltimore Orioles goalie Omar Kelly (left) blocks a shot by the Atlantic City Seagulls' Herb Foster on March 21, 1939 at Riverside Stadium in Washington, D.C.

The Seagulls began as an independent amateur team in 1930, playing exhibition games in their inaugural season. After formalizing the organization the following year, the team became a founding member of the Tri-State Hockey League. After the Seagulls won the championship, the league folded and was replaced by the Eastern Amateur Hockey League in December. Atlantic City was a staple of the EAHL for nine seasons but the team began experience problems due to World War II. Due to financial and personnel constraints, the team posted its worst performance in 1942. After the season, the Philadelphia Rockets announced that they were suspending operations. The Seagulls then moved to Philadelphia, taking up residency at the Philadelphia Arena, which, although was a small venue, was in a much more populated area.

After the war, a second Atlantic City Seagulls team was founded, although it had no connection to this franchise.

== Season-by-season record ==
Note: GP = Games played, W = Wins, L = Losses, T = Ties, Pts = Points, GF = Goals for, GA = Goals against

Season	GP	W	L	T	Pts	GF	GA	Finish	Coach	Playoffs
1931–32	?	?	?	?	?	?	?	Independent	?	None
1932–33	18	15	1	2	32	100	27	1st	Redvers MacKenzie	none
1933–34	23	19	3	1	39	110	45	1st	Redvers MacKenzie	unknown
1934–35	21	8	10	3	19	44	64	3rd	Redvers MacKenzie	unknown
1935–36	39	20	18	1	43	101	111	3rd	Redvers MacKenzie	unknown
1936–37	48	27	19	2	56	148	120	2nd	Redvers MacKenzie	Lost Championship, 1–3 (Hershey Bears)
1937–38	58	31	16	11	72	199	168	2nd	Redvers MacKenzie	unknown
1938–39	53	22	25	6	50	170	184	3rd	Redvers MacKenzie	unknown
1939–40	61	25	31	5	55	207	242	4th	Bert Corbeau	none
1940–41	65	32	28	5	69	253	256	3rd	Bert Corbeau	unknown
1941–42	60	20	39	1	41	239	316	6th	Bert Corbeau	unknown
