= United States Coast Guard Cutters =

Senior amateur ice hockey team

- City: Baltimore, Maryland
- League: Eastern Amateur Hockey League
- Operated: 1942–1943
- Home arena: Carlin's Iceland
- Colors: Red, white, and blue
- Head coach: Mel Harwood

Championships
- Regular season titles: 1 (1942–43)
- Playoff championships: 1 (1942–43)

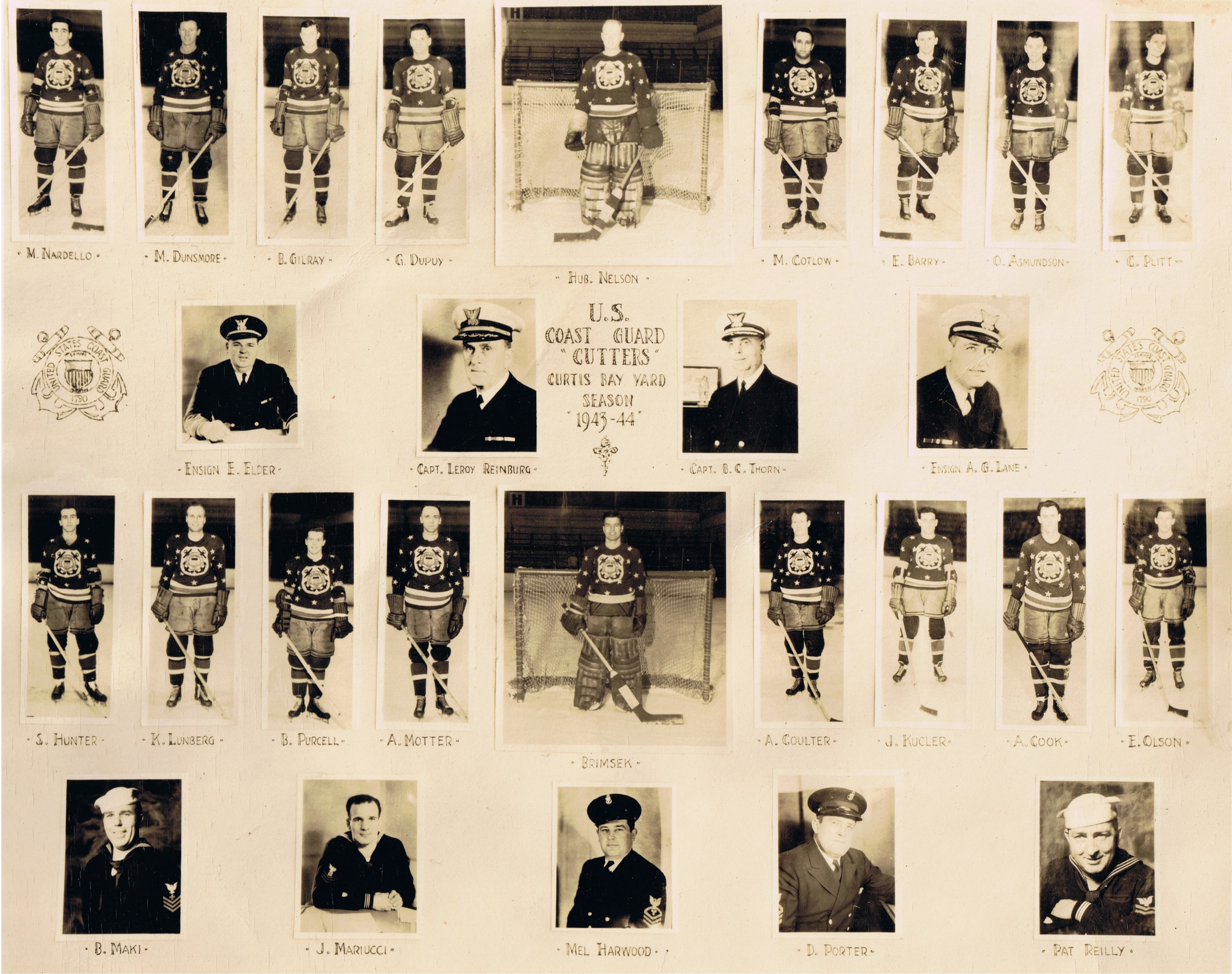
1943–44 team photo of the United States Coast Guard Cutters hockey team.

The United States Coast Guard Cutters were a senior amateur ice hockey team operated by the United States Coast Guard Yard on Curtis Bay, Baltimore. The team played in the Eastern Amateur Hockey League for parts of two seasons, using Carlin's Iceland for home games. The Cutters were a separate team from the established Coast Guard Bears of the United States Coast Guard Academy.

== History ==
The team was founded in 1942 by personnel officer Lieutenant Commander C.R. MacLean, of the Coast Guard in Curtis Bay, and replaced the void in the EAHL when the Baltimore Orioles folded. The Cutters were coached by Mel Harwood, a former goaltender for the Orioles, and a former NHL referee known for officiating game four of the 1942 Stanley Cup Finals. Players were required to complete daytime military duties, in addition to playing on the team. The team was accompanied by their own version of the United States Coast Guard Band, that played the “Semper Paratus march," whenever the Cutters scored a goal.

In the 1942–43 season, Joe Kucler led the league in goals (40), assists (41), and points (81). The Cutters played the defending Stanley Cup champion Detroit Red Wings in an exhibition game on January 6, 1943 in Baltimore, losing 8–3. The Cutters finished first place in the EAHL, winning the Walker Cup. In addition to the EAHL title, the Cutters won two championships of the Amateur Hockey Association of the United States, in 1943 and 1944. Eleven games into the second season, the Cutters withdrew from league play on November 28, 1943, but still played exhibition games. The Cutters team disbanded early in 1944, when the World War II effort needed reinforcements.

== Players ==
The Cutters team featured eight National Hockey League players.

Three Cutters players were inducted into the Hockey Hall of Fame: Frank Brimsek, Art Coulter, and John Mariucci.

Five Cutters players were inducted into the United States Hockey Hall of Fame: Frank Brimsek, Bob Dill, John Mariucci, Hub Nelson, and Eddie Olson.

Other notable players

- Ossie Asmundson
- Eddie Barry
- Bud Cook
- Alex Motter

== Results ==
Season-by-season results:

Season	GP	W	L	T	Pts	Pct	GF	GA	Standing
1942–43	46	32	13	1	65	0.707	223	138	1st, EAHL
1943–44	11	7	4	0	14	0.636	66	30	withdrew
TOTALS	57	39	17	1	79	0.693	289	168	1 Walker Cup
