= River Vale Skeeters =

- City: River Vale, New Jersey
- League: Eastern Amateur Hockey League (EAHL)
- Operated: 1939–1942
- Colors: Black, white

The River Vale Skeeters were an American professional ice hockey team based in River Vale, New Jersey.

== History ==
River Vale was founded in 1939, after John Handwerg built an arena in northeast Bergen County adjacent to his golf course. The Skeeters regularly saw capacity crowds at the 4,000-seat arena, despite posting losing records in each of their three seasons. The team was forced to suspend operations in 1942 after the United States entered World War II and the war office converted the rink for defensive purposes. After the war, the building was not converted back into a rink and the Skeeters were left for dead.

== Season-by-season record ==
Note: GP = Games played, W = Wins, L = Losses, T = Ties, Pts = Points, GF = Goals for, GA = Goals against

EHL Season	GP	W	L	T	Pts	GF	GA	Finish	Coach	Playoffs
1939–40	61	16	38	7	39	173	267	5th	Carl White	none
1940–41	65	29	34	2	60	217	240	4th	Jack McKinnon	none
1941–42	60	18	38	4	40	191	265	6th	Jesse Spring	none
