= Baltimore Orioles (ice hockey) =

1932–1942 minor league hockey team

- City: Baltimore, Maryland
- League: TSHL (1932–33); EAHL (1933–42)
- Operated: 1932 to 1942
- Home arena: Carlin's Iceland

Championships
- Regular season titles: 1 (1939-40)

The Baltimore Orioles were a minor league ice hockey team that operated out of Carlin's Iceland from 1932 until 1942. The team was Baltimore's first professional hockey club. The Orioles played in the Tri-State Hockey League during the 1932–33 season. In 1933, the Orioles joined the Eastern Amateur Hockey League and remained there until 1942. The Orioles were coached by Billy Boyd (1933–35), Gord Fraser (1935–36), Bill Hines (1938–41), and Elmer Piper (1941–42). The Orioles won the EAHL championship in the 1939–40 season. The team disbanded in 1942, when it lost players to enlistment for service in World War II. The Orioles' EAHL replacement in Baltimore were the United States Coast Guard Cutters, a team made of enlisted sailors.

== Players ==
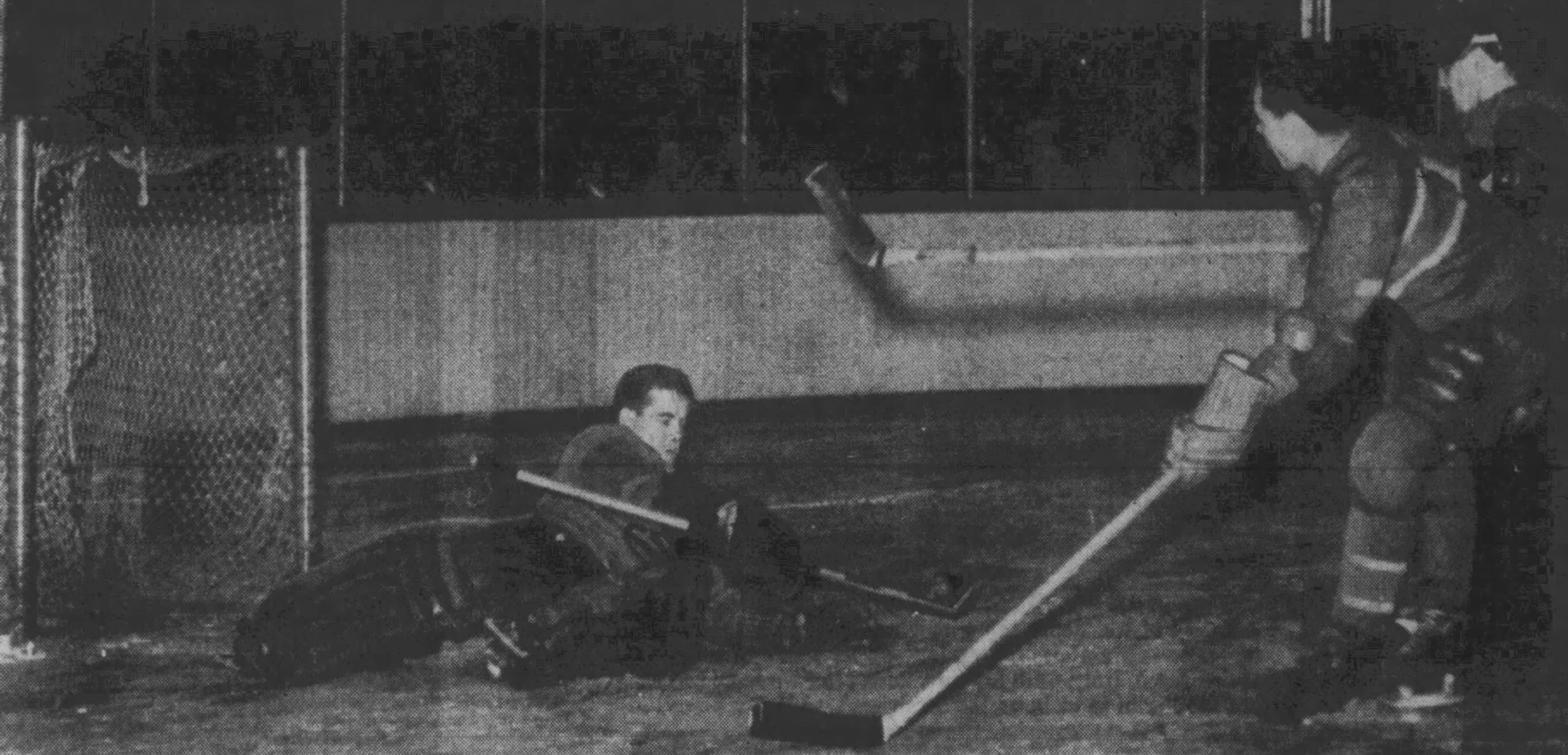
Baltimore Orioles goalie Omar Kelly (left) blocks a shot by the Atlantic City Seagulls' Herb Foster on March 21, 1939 at Riverside Stadium in Washington, D.C.

Notable league executive Jack Riley played for the Orioles from 1938 to 1942. Twelve Orioles also played in the National Hockey League.

- Clarence Behling
- Norm Calladine
- Ab DeMarco
- Bob Dill
- Jack Dyte
- George Grigor
- Fred Hunt
- Bobby Lee
- Bill Moe
- Joe Papike
- Aud Tuten
- Chick Webster

== Results ==
Season-by-season results:

Season	League	GP	W	L	T	Pts	Pct	GF	GA	Standing
1932–33	TSHL	18	12	5	1	25	0.694	43	33	2nd, TSHL
1933–34	EAHL	24	18	4	2	38	0.792	88	46	2nd, EAHL
1934–35	EAHL	21	4	13	4	12	0.286	41	57	4th, EAHL
1935–36	EAHL	40	9	29	2	20	0.250	78	141	5th, EAHL
1936–37	EAHL	48	16	24	8	40	0.417	121	135	5th, EAHL
1937–38	EAHL	58	21	29	8	50	0.431	176	195	4th, EAHL
1938–39	EAHL	53	26	22	5	57	0.538	178	165	2nd, EAHL
1939–40	EAHL	61	38	21	2	78	0.639	263	185	1st, EAHL
1940–41	EAHL	65	36	23	6	78	0.600	240	194	2nd, EAHL
1941–42	EAHL	60	26	30	4	56	0.467	252	262	5th, EAHL
TOTALS		448	206	200	42	454	0.507	1480	1413	1 Walker Cup
