= Jersey Larks =

Professional ice hockey team based in Cherry Hill, New Jersey

The Jersey Larks are a defunct professional ice hockey team which played in the Eastern Hockey League during the 1960–61 season. Based in Cherry Hill, New Jersey, they played their home games out of the Haddonfield Ice House.

Coached by Ray Miron in their only season of play, the Larks posted a regular-season record of 24 wins, 39 losses, and 1 tie, to qualify for the playoffs, before losing in the second round.

They would move to Knoxville, Tennessee after the 1960-61 EHL season, becoming the Knoxville Knights.
