= Atlantic City Seagulls (EHL) =

- City: Atlantic City, New Jersey
- League: Eastern Amateur Hockey League (EAHL)
- Operated: 1947–1952
- Home arena: Boardwalk Hall
- Colors: Red, white, teal

Championships
- Playoff championships: 1951

The Atlantic City Seagulls was an American professional ice hockey team based in Atlantic City, New Jersey. The team shared the same name with an earlier franchise that had moved to Philadelphia in 1942.

== History ==
After the original Seagulls franchise relocated because of World War II, the Boardwalk Hall remained without a tenant until 1947. A new Atlantic City Seagulls (sometimes spelled 'Sea Gulls') joined the Eastern Amateur Hockey League. The team, coached by Mel Harwood, finished third out of four teams but then was forced to suspend play when the entire league went dormant in 1948. When the EAHL returned in 1949, so did the Seagulls. Now led by Herb Foster, who had played on the original squad, Atlantic City hoped to recapture the magic that the former franchise had possessed. Foster led the team to a league championship in 1951 and the Seagulls advanced to the national senior championship. Ultimately, they fell to the Toledo Mercurys 3–4 in the semifinals.

While the franchise had modest success on the ice, the falling tourism in Atlantic City after the war harmed the team in the ticket office. By 1952 the Seagulls were no longer able to support themselves and the team dissolved.

== Notable players, coaches and owners ==
- Herb Foster; played for the Seagulls in its first two seasons and coached for the final three.
- Stan Smrke; played during the inaugural season before becoming the first Yugoslavian-born player in NHL history.
- Val Delory; suited up for the team but did not play in any games before being traded to the New York Rovers.
- Dick Bittner; played in three games during the inaugural season.
- Len Speck; played the early part of his long minor league career with the Seagulls.
- Gordie Haworth; played seven games for Atlantic City in 1950.
- George Hayes; led the Seagulls in scoring in 1951.
- Gordon Buttrey; played in the team's final two seasons.
- Lorne Anderson; the team's primary goaltender in 1951.
- Ross Johnstone; finished his career with the Seagulls in 1952.

== Season-by-season record ==
Note: GP = Games played, W = Wins, L = Losses, T = Ties, Pts = Points, GF = Goals for, GA = Goals against

EHL Season	GP	W	L	T	Pts	GF	GA	Finish	Coach	Playoffs
1947–48	48	17	25	6	40	167	196	3rd	Mel Harwood	None
1948–49	league suspended play									
1949–50	47	14	31	2	30	122	193	3rd in East	Herb Foster	Lost East Round-Robin
1950–51	54	23	24	7	53	231	218	T–3rd	Herb Foster	Won Championship
1951–52	65	26	36	3	55	255	231	2nd in Southern	Herb Foster	Missed playoffs
