= Eastern Hockey League =

Former ice hockey minor league in USA

- Final logo in 1972–73
- Sport: Ice hockey
- Founded: 1933; 93 years ago
- Folded: 1973; 53 years ago
- Replaced by: North American Hockey League; Southern Hockey League
- President: Tommy Lockhart
- Country: United States

The Eastern Hockey League was a minor professional United States ice hockey league.

== Eastern Amateur Hockey League (1933–1953) ==
The league was founded in 1933 as the Eastern Amateur Hockey League (EAHL). The league was founded by Tommy Lockhart, who served as its commissioner from 1937 to 1972. Lockhart, who operated a small intramural hockey league at New York City's Madison Square Garden, offered his teams – and the use of the MSG ice – in exchange for joining the league.

The EAHL operated between 1933–1948 and 1949–1953. The league had a somewhat tenuous existence. It began with seven teams, and had various numbers of teams, going as low as four. There was no 1948–49 season, but the league returned for the 1949–50 season with eight teams. The league again did not operate during the 1953–54 season.

=== Teams ===
- Atlantic City Seagulls (1932–33 to 1941–42)
- Atlantic City Seagulls [second franchise] (1947–48 to 1951–52)
- Baltimore Blades / Clippers (1944–45 to 1949–50)
- Baltimore Orioles (1933–34 to 1941–42)
- Boston Olympics (1940–41 to 1951–52)
- Bronx Tigers (1933–34 to 1933–34; 1937–38)
- Brooklyn Crescents (1943–44)
- Cleveland Knights (1949–50)
- Crescent-Hamilton Athletic Club (1933–34 to 1934–35)
- Grand Rapids Rockets (1949–50)
- Hershey B'ars / Bears (1933–34 to 1937–38)
- Hershey Cubs (1938–39)
- Johnstown Blue Birds (1941–42)
- Johnstown Jets (1950–51 to 1952–53)
- Milwaukee Clarks (1949–50)
- New Haven Eagles (1943–44)
- New Haven Tomahawks / Nutmegs (1951–53)
- New York Athletic Club (1933–34)
- New York Rovers (1935–36 to 1951–52)
- Philadelphia Falcons (1942–43 to 1945–46; 1951–52)
- Pittsburgh Yellow Jackets (1935–36 to 1936–37)
- River Vale Skeeters (1939–40 to 1941–42)
- St. Nicholas Hockey Club (1933–34)
- Springfield Indians (1951–52 to 1952–53)
- Toledo Buckeyes (1949–50)
- Troy Uncle Sam's Trojans (1952–53)
- United States Coast Guard Cutters (1942–43)
- Washington Eagles (1939–40 to 1941–42)
- Washington Lions (1944–45 to 1946–47; 1951–52 to 1952–53)

== Eastern Hockey League (1954–1973) ==
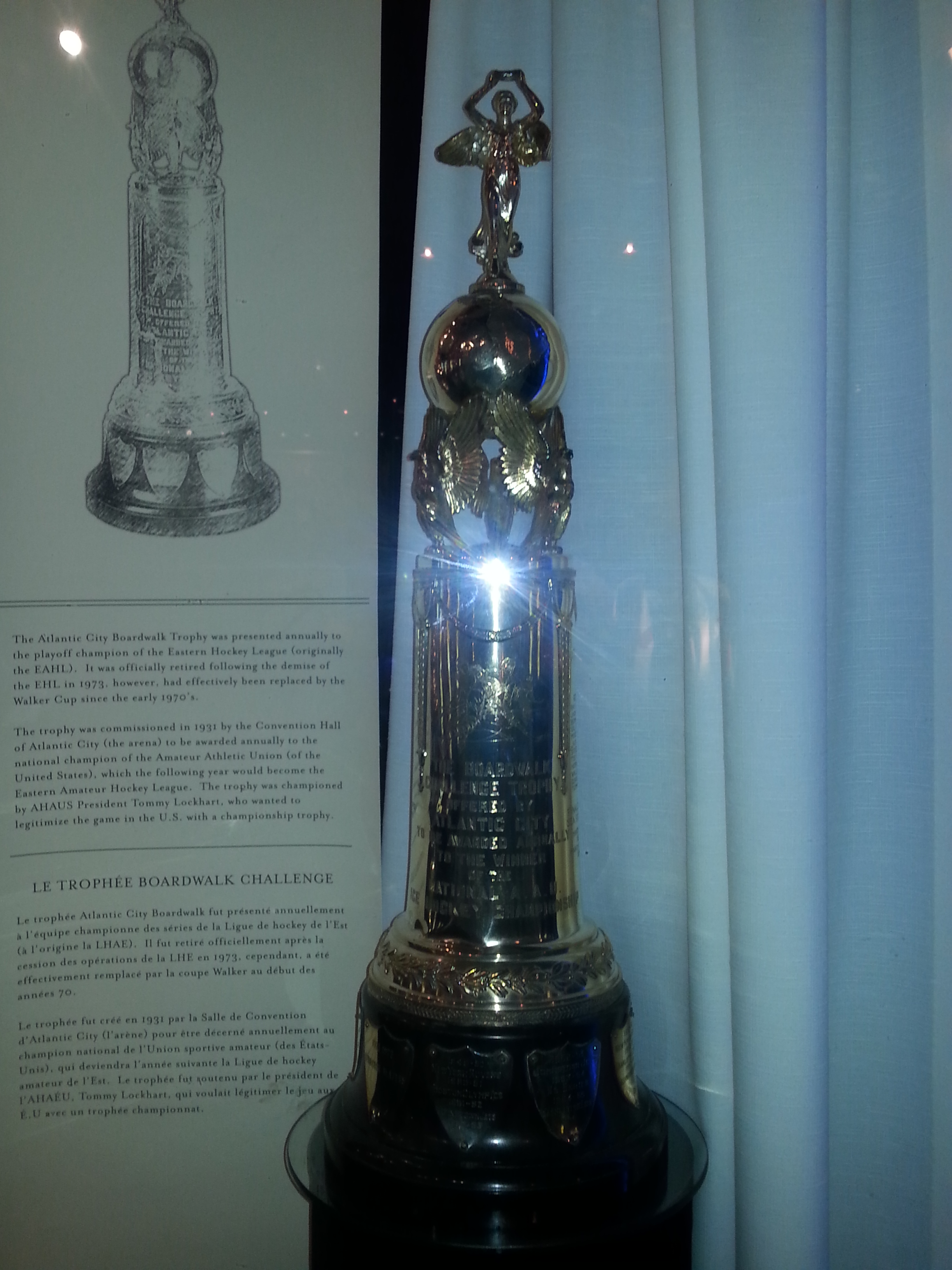
Atlantic City Boardwalk Trophy at the Hockey Hall of Fame

The league started back up for the 1954–55 season and changed its name to the Eastern Hockey League. This incarnation of the league operated between 1954 and 1973. It began with five teams and grew into two divisions for the 1959–60 season. The league reached its peak in terms of team numbers in the 1967–68 when it had twelve teams in two divisions. In its final season the league had twelve teams split into three divisions.

The EHL was the first hockey league at any level to place a team south of Washington for the entire season. This came by accident, when the Baltimore Clippers' arena burned down in January 1956. Forced to scramble for a new home, the Clippers found one in Charlotte, North Carolina and moved there for the rest of the season as the Charlotte Rebels. They ultimately decided to move to Charlotte permanently for the following season as the Charlotte Clippers, later becoming the Charlotte Checkers. They were the first of seven Southern teams to join the league over the next decade.

As time went on, tensions grew between the league's Northern and Southern teams. The Southern teams chafed at only being allowed to dress 14 skaters, and were also concerned about travel expenses. By the early 1970s, the Southern teams almost never ventured north. Finally, after the 1972-73 season, the league's four Southern teams-the Checkers, Roanoke Valley Rebels, Greensboro Generals and Suncoast Suns-announced they were pulling out of the league. With the EHL already in financial trouble, the league's governors voted to disband. The Southern teams reorganized as the Southern Hockey League, while all but one of its Northern teams reorganized as the North American Hockey League.

=== Teams ===
- Baltimore Clippers (1954–55 to January 23, 1956)
- Cape Cod Cubs (1972–73)
- Charlotte Rebels/Clippers/Checkers (January 30, 1956 to 1972–73)
- Clinton Comets (1954–55 to 1972–73)
- Greensboro Generals (1959–60 to 1972–73)
- Jacksonville Rockets/Florida Rockets (1964–65 to 1971–72)
- Jersey Devils (1964–65 to 1972–73)
- Jersey Larks (1960–61)
- Johnstown Jets (1955–56 to 1972–73)
- Knoxville Knights (1961–62 to 1967–68)
- Long Island Ducks (1961–62 to 1972–73)
- Nashville Dixie Flyers (1962–63 to 1970–71)
- New England Blades (1972–73)
- New Haven Blades (1954–55 to 1971–72)
- New York Rovers (1959–60 to 1960–61; 1964–65)
- Philadelphia Ramblers (1955–56 to 1963–64)
- Rhode Island Eagles (1972–73)
- Roanoke Valley Rebels (1970–71 to 1972–73)
- Salem Rebels (1967–68 to 1969–70)
- St. Petersburg Suns (1971–72)
- Suncoast Suns (1972–73)
- Syracuse Blazers (1967–68 to 1972–73)
- Washington Lions (1954–55 to 1956–57)
- Washington Presidents (1957–58 to 1959–60)
- Worcester Warriors (1954–55)
