= 1977–78 Edmonton Oilers season =

WHA hockey team season

1977–78 Edmonton Oilers
- Division: 5th WHA
- 1977–78 record: 38–39–3
- Home record: 24–15–2
- Road record: 14–24–1
- Goals for: 309
- Goals against: 307

Team information
- General manager: Brian Conacher
- Coach: Glen Sather
- Captain: Paul Shmyr
- Alternate captains: Norm Ferguson; Bill Flett; Al Hamilton
- Arena: Northlands Coliseum
- Minor league affiliate: Spokane Flyers (WIHL)

Team leaders
- Goals: Bill Flett (41)
- Assists: Ron Chipperfield (52)
- Points: Ron Chipperfield (85)
- Penalty minutes: Ron Busniuk (157)
- Plus/minus: Al Hamilton (+24)
- Wins: Dave Dryden (21)
- Goals against average: Dave Dryden (3.49)

The 1977–78 Edmonton Oilers season was the Oilers' sixth season of operation. The Oilers placed fifth to qualify for the playoffs, losing in the first round.

== Regular season ==
=== Final standings ===
Note: W = Wins, L = Losses, T = Ties, GF= Goals For, GA = Goals Against, Pts = Points

WHA Team	W	L	T	Pts	GF	GA	PIM
Winnipeg Jets	50	28	2	102	381	270	988
New England Whalers	44	31	5	93	335	269	1255
Houston Aeros	42	34	4	88	296	302	1543
Quebec Nordiques	40	37	3	83	349	347	1185
Edmonton Oilers	38	39	3	79	309	307	1296
Birmingham Bulls	36	41	3	75	287	314	2177
Cincinnati Stingers	35	42	3	73	298	332	1701
Indianapolis Racers	24	51	5	53	267	353	1189
Soviet All-Stars	3	4	1	7	27	36	120
Czechoslovakia All-Stars	1	6	1	3	21	40	87

== Schedule and results ==
1977–78 regular season
October

Game	Result	Date	Score	Opponent	Record
1	L	October 12, 1977	3–7	Winnipeg Jets (1977–78)	0–1–0
2	W	October 14, 1977	4–2	Quebec Nordiques (1977–78)	1–1–0
3	L	October 15, 1977	2–6	@ Quebec Nordiques (1977–78)	1–2–0
4	L	October 19, 1977	3–6	New England Whalers (1977–78)	1–3–0
5	L	October 26, 1977	7–8 OT	@ Houston Aeros (1977–78)	1–4–0
6	W	October 28, 1977	3–2	@ Birmingham Bulls (1977–78)	2–4–0
7	L	October 30, 1977	2–5	@ Winnipeg Jets (1977–78)	2–5–0

November

Game	Result	Date	Score	Opponent	Record
8	L	November 2, 1977	3–6	Winnipeg Jets (1977–78)	2–6–0
9	W	November 4, 1977	3–1	Indianapolis Racers (1977–78)	3–6–0
10	W	November 6, 1977	7–1	Houston Aeros (1977–78)	4–6–0
11	L	November 8, 1977	3–7	@ Quebec Nordiques (1977–78)	4–7–0
12	L	November 10, 1977	3–5	@ New England Whalers (1977–78)	4–8–0
13	W	November 11, 1977	3–2	@ Cincinnati Stingers (1977–78)	5–8–0
14	T	November 12, 1977	1–1	@ Birmingham Bulls (1977–78)	5–8–1
15	W	November 16, 1977	6–4	Cincinnati Stingers (1977–78)	6–8–1
16	W	November 18, 1977	4–3 OT	Cincinnati Stingers (1977–78)	7–8–1
17	L	November 20, 1977	4–5 OT	New England Whalers (1977–78)	7–9–1
18	W	November 22, 1977	4–2	Winnipeg Jets (1977–78)	8–9–1
19	L	November 24, 1977	4–5 OT	@ Indianapolis Racers (1977–78)	8–10–1
20	W	November 26, 1977	3–1	@ New England Whalers (1977–78)	9–10–1
21	W	November 30, 1977	4–2	Birmingham Bulls (1977–78)	10–10–1

December

Game	Result	Date	Score	Opponent	Record
22	L	December 2, 1977	5–7	Birmingham Bulls (1977–78)	10–11–1
23	W	December 4, 1977	3–2	@ Winnipeg Jets (1977–78)	11–11–1
24	W	December 7, 1977	5–4 OT	Cincinnati Stingers (1977–78)	12–11–1
25	L	December 9, 1977	3–5	Houston Aeros (1977–78)	12–12–1
26	L	December 11, 1977	2–4	Houston Aeros (1977–78)	12–13–1
27	W	December 14, 1977	6–1	Czechoslovakia (1977–78)	13–13–1
28	L	December 18, 1977	2–3	@ Birmingham Bulls (1977–78)	13–14–1
29	L	December 20, 1977	4–6	@ Houston Aeros (1977–78)	13–15–1
30	W	December 21, 1977	5–2	Soviet All-Stars (1977–78)	14–15–1
31	W	December 27, 1977	9–3	Quebec Nordiques (1977–78)	15–15–1
32	W	December 30, 1977	8–5	Indianapolis Racers (1977–78)	16–15–1

January

Game	Result	Date	Score	Opponent	Record
33	L	January 1, 1978	1–2	Houston Aeros (1977–78)	16–16–1
34	L	January 6, 1978	1–4	Winnipeg Jets (1977–78)	16–17–1
35	W	January 8, 1978	4–2	@ Houston Aeros (1977–78)	17–17–1
36	W	January 11, 1978	2–0	@ Cincinnati Stingers (1977–78)	18–17–1
37	L	January 13, 1978	0–2	@ New England Whalers (1977–78)	18–18–1
38	L	January 14, 1978	4–7	@ Quebec Nordiques (1977–78)	18–19–1
39	W	January 15, 1978	4–3 OT	@ Winnipeg Jets (1977–78)	19–19–1
40	W	January 18, 1978	1–0	New England Whalers (1977–78)	20–19–1
41	L	January 20, 1978	3–5	@ Birmingham Bulls (1977–78)	20–20–1
42	W	January 21, 1978	3–2	@ Indianapolis Racers (1977–78)	21–20–1
43	L	January 22, 1978	2–5	@ Cincinnati Stingers (1977–78)	21–21–1
44	W	January 25, 1978	6–2	Indianapolis Racers (1977–78)	22–21–1
45	W	January 27, 1978	9–6	Quebec Nordiques (1977–78)	23–21–1
46	L	January 29, 1978	3–4	Quebec Nordiques (1977–78)	23–22–1
47	W	January 31, 1978	6–4	@ Indianapolis Racers (1977–78)	24–22–1

February

Game	Result	Date	Score	Opponent	Record
48	L	February 1, 1978	3–4	@ New England Whalers (1977–78)	24–23–1
49	W	February 3, 1978	6–3	@ New England Whalers (1977–78)	25–23–1
50	W	February 4, 1978	4–3 OT	@ Quebec Nordiques (1977–78)	26–23–1
51	L	February 5, 1978	3–4	@ Winnipeg Jets (1977–78)	26–24–1
52	T	February 8, 1978	6–6	Cincinnati Stingers (1977–78)	26–24–2
53	W	February 12, 1978	7–0	Birmingham Bulls (1977–78)	27–24–2
54	W	February 14, 1978	4–1	Birmingham Bulls (1977–78)	28–24–2
55	L	February 15, 1978	5–6	@ Winnipeg Jets (1977–78)	28–25–2
56	W	February 17, 1978	6–4	Quebec Nordiques (1977–78)	29–25–2
57	W	February 19, 1978	4–3 OT	Indianapolis Racers (1977–78)	30–25–2
58	L	February 22, 1978	5–6	Houston Aeros (1977–78)	30–26–2
59	W	February 24, 1978	5–4 OT	Houston Aeros (1977–78)	31–26–2
60	L	February 26, 1978	5–6	New England Whalers (1977–78)	31–27–2

March

Game	Result	Date	Score	Opponent	Record
61	L	March 1, 1978	4–6	Cincinnati Stingers (1977–78)	31–28–2
62	L	March 3, 1978	6–8	Indianapolis Racers (1977–78)	31–29–2
63	W	March 5, 1978	4–3	@ Birmingham Bulls (1977–78)	32–29–2
64	L	March 7, 1978	3–4	@ Houston Aeros (1977–78)	32–30–2
65	L	March 9, 1978	5–6	@ Cincinnati Stingers (1977–78)	32–31–2
66	L	March 11, 1978	0–2	@ Cincinnati Stingers (1977–78)	32–32–2
67	L	March 14, 1978	3–6	@ Quebec Nordiques (1977–78)	32–33–2
68	L	March 15, 1978	4–8	@ Winnipeg Jets (1977–78)	32–34–2
69	W	March 17, 1978	6–2	Winnipeg Jets (1977–78)	33–34–2
70	W	March 19, 1978	4–2	Cincinnati Stingers (1977–78)	34–34–2
71	L	March 22, 1978	3–5	Birmingham Bulls (1977–78)	34–35–2
72	W	March 24, 1978	4–0	Indianapolis Racers (1977–78)	35–35–2
73	L	March 26, 1978	3–5	@ New England Whalers (1977–78)	35–36–2
74	W	March 28, 1978	4–3 OT	@ Indianapolis Racers (1977–78)	36–36–2
75	L	March 30, 1978	1–5	@ Houston Aeros (1977–78)	36–37–2
76	L	March 31, 1978	2–5	@ Birmingham Bulls (1977–78)	36–38–2

April

Game	Result	Date	Score	Opponent	Record
77	W	April 1, 1978	4–1	@ Indianapolis Racers (1977–78)	37–38–2
78	L	April 4, 1978	1–9	@ Quebec Nordiques (1977–78)	37–39–2
79	T	April 5, 1978	4–4	New England Whalers (1977–78)	37–39–3
80	W	April 7, 1978	4–2	Winnipeg Jets (1977–78)	38–39–3

Legend: Win (2 points) Loss (0 points) Tie (1 point)

== Playoffs ==
1978 Avco Cup playoffs
Quarterfinals vs. (2) New England Whalers – Whalers win 4–1

Game	Date	Visitor	Score	Home	Series
1	April 14	Edmonton	4–6	New England	0–1
2	April 16	Edmonton	1–4	New England	0–2
3	April 19	New England	0–2	Edmonton	1–2
4	April 21	New England	9–1	Edmonton	1–3
5	April 23	Edmonton	1–4	New England	1–4

Legend: Win Loss

== Player statistics ==
Regular season
Scoring

Player	Pos	GP	G	A	Pts	PIM	+/-	PPG	SHG	GWG
Ron Chipperfield	C	80	33	52	85	48	1	11	1	0
Bill Flett	RW	74	41	28	69	34	9	8	1	0
Blair MacDonald	RW	80	34	34	68	11	−12	7	4	0
Mike Zuke	C	71	23	34	57	47	1	2	3	0
Al Hamilton	D	59	11	43	54	46	24	6	0	0
Brett Callighen	C	80	20	30	50	112	5	1	0	0
Paul Shmyr	D	80	9	40	49	100	−9	3	0	0
Joe Micheletti	D	56	14	34	48	56	8	3	0	0
Norm Ferguson	RW	71	26	21	47	2	14	8	0	0
Juha Widing	C	71	18	24	42	8	10	0	1	0
Pierre Guite	LW	60	12	21	33	71	−7	2	0	0
Randy Rota	C/LW	53	8	22	30	12	11	0	0	0
Dave Langevin	D	62	6	22	28	90	11	1	0	0
Bryan Campbell	C	53	7	13	20	12	−17	2	0	0
Ron Busniuk	RW	59	2	18	20	157	−8	0	0	0
Ab DeMarco	D	47	6	8	14	20	−7	3	0	0
Pierre Jarry	LW	18	4	10	14	4	−1	0	0	0
Gary MacGregor	C	37	11	2	13	29	−2	2	0	0
Dave Semenko	LW	65	6	6	12	140	−4	0	0	0
Dennis Sobchuk	C	13	6	3	9	4	−4	1	0	0
Don McLeod	G	33	0	8	8	2	0	0	0	0
Ken Baird	D	6	2	4	6	2	0	0	0	0
Warren Miller	RW	18	2	4	6	18	1	0	0	0
Ray McKay	D	14	1	4	5	4	3	0	0	0
Butch Deadmarsh	LW	20	1	3	4	32	−1	0	0	0
Jerry Holland	LW	22	2	1	3	14	−1	1	0	0
Cal Sandbeck	D	11	1	2	3	39	1	1	0	0
Jim Troy	RW	47	2	0	2	124	−11	0	0	0
Rick Morris	LW	5	1	1	2	7	−7	0	1	0
Craig Topolnisky	D	10	0	2	2	4	−1	0	0	0
Dave Dryden	G	48	0	1	1	0	0	0	0	0
Dave Inkpen	D	19	0	1	1	16	−6	0	0	0
Owen Lloyd	D	3	0	1	1	4	−1	0	0	0
Gerry Pinder	LW	5	0	1	1	0	−1	0	0	0
Kevin Primeau	RW	7	0	1	1	2	−1	0	0	0
Chris Ahrens	D	4	0	0	0	15	−5	0	0	0
Ken Broderick	G	9	0	0	0	0	0	0	0	0
Jim Cross	LW	2	0	0	0	0	−3	0	0	0
Bob Falkenberg	D	2	0	0	0	0	−1	0	0	0
Del Hall	C	1	0	0	0	0	0	0	0	0
Dale McMullin	LW	1	0	0	0	0	0	0	0	0
Frank Turnbull	G	1	0	0	0	0	0	0	0	0

Goaltending

Player	MIN	GP	W	L	T	GA	GAA	SO
Dave Dryden	2578	48	21	23	2	150	3.49	2
Don McLeod	1723	33	15	10	1	102	3.55	2
Ken Broderick	497	9	2	5	0	42	5.07	0
Frank Turnbull	60	1	0	1	0	6	6.00	0
Team:	4858	80	38	39	3	300	3.71	4

Playoffs
Scoring

Player	Pos	GP	G	A	Pts	PIM	PPG	SHG	GWG
Mike Zuke	C	5	2	3	5	0	0	0	0
Paul Shmyr	D	5	1	3	4	11	0	0	0
Ron Chipperfield	C	5	1	1	2	0	0	0	0
Pierre Guite	LW	5	1	1	2	20	0	0	1
Blair MacDonald	RW	5	1	1	2	0	0	0	0
Randy Rota	C/LW	5	1	1	2	4	0	0	0
Brett Callighen	C	5	0	2	2	16	0	0	0
Dave Langevin	D	5	0	2	2	10	0	0	0
Joe Micheletti	D	5	0	2	2	4	0	0	0
Pierre Jarry	LW	5	1	0	1	4	0	0	0
Dennis Sobchuk	C	5	1	0	1	4	0	0	0
Ray McKay	D	4	0	1	1	4	0	0	0
Juha Widing	C	5	0	1	1	0	0	0	0
Ron Busniuk	RW	5	0	0	0	18	0	0	0
Ab DeMarco	D	1	0	0	0	0	0	0	0
Dave Dryden	G	2	0	0	0	0	0	0	0
Norm Ferguson	RW	5	0	0	0	0	0	0	0
Don McLeod	G	4	0	0	0	0	0	0	0
Kevin Primeau	RW	2	0	0	0	2	0	0	0
Cal Sandbeck	D	5	0	0	0	10	0	0	0
Dave Semenko	LW	5	0	0	0	8	0	0	0
Jim Troy	RW	2	0	0	0	0	0	0	0

Goaltending

Player	MIN	GP	W	L	GA	GAA	SO
Don McLeod	207	4	1	3	16	4.64	1
Dave Dryden	91	2	0	1	6	3.96	0
Team:	298	5	1	4	22	4.43	1

Note: Pos = Position; GP = Games played; G = Goals; A = Assists; Pts = Points; +/- = plus/minus; PIM = Penalty minutes; PPG = Power-play goals; SHG = Short-handed goals; GWG = Game-winning goals
MIN = Minutes played; W = Wins; L = Losses; T = Ties; GA = Goals-against; GAA = Goals-against average; SO = Shutouts;

== Transactions ==
=== Trades ===
Date	To Edmonton Oilers	Traded to	Traded for
June 1977	Jim Troy	New England Whalers	Brett Callighen
June 16, 1977	Dave Dryden; Brett Callighen; 1st-round pick in 1977 - Ron Areshenkoff; 4th-round pick in 1977 - Dan Clark	New England Whalers	Jean-Louis Levasseur
September 9, 1977	Blair MacDonald; Dave Inkpen; Mike Zuke	Indianapolis Racers	Barry Wilkins; Ed Patenaude; Claude St. Sauveur; Kevin Devine
September 19, 1977	Jeff Jacques; Lou Nistico	Birmingham Bulls	Chris Evans; Pete Laframboise; Danny Arndt
September 19, 1977	Future considerations	Indianapolis Racers	Kevin Morrison; Bill Prentice; Bob Russell
September 19, 1977	Don Tannahill; Peter Donnelly	Quebec Nordiques	Future considerations
October 16, 1977	Dave Semenko	Houston Aeros	Future considerations
November 25, 1977	Pierre Guité; Don McLeod	Quebec Nordiques	Dave Inkpen; Rick Morris; Warren Miller; Ken Broderick
December 16, 1977	Dennis Sobchuk; Del Hall	Cincinnati Stingers	Butch Deadmarsh; Dave Debol; Future considerations Cash
March 3, 1978	Pierre Jarry; Chris Ahrens	Minnesota North Stars (NHL)	Future considerations

=== Players acquired ===
Date	Player	Former team	Term
August 25, 1977	Doug Berry	Calgary Cowboys	
August 25, 1977	Ron Chipperfield	Calgary Cowboys	
August 25, 1977	Chris Evans	Calgary Cowboys	
August 25, 1977	Don Micheletti	Calgary Cowboys	
August 25, 1977	Joe Micheletti	Calgary Cowboys	
August 25, 1977	Warren Miller	Calgary Cowboys	
August 25, 1977	Perry Schnarr	Calgary Cowboys	
August 25, 1977	Steve Stoyanovich	Calgary Cowboys	
August 25, 1977	Kevin Devine	San Diego Mariners	
August 25, 1977	Norm Ferguson	San Diego Mariners	
August 25, 1977	Randy Legge	San Diego Mariners	
August 25, 1977	Kevin Morrison	San Diego Mariners	
August 25, 1977	Paul Shmyr	San Diego Mariners	
September 9, 1977	Butch Deadmarsh	Calgary Cowboys	
September 14, 1977	Jerry Holland	New York Rangers (NHL)	
September 14, 1977	Gary MacGregor	Indianapolis Racers	
September 16, 1977	Juha Widing	Cleveland Crusaders	2-year
October 1977	Bob Falkenberg	San Diego Mariners	
October 12, 1977	Ken Baird	Calgary Cowboys	
October 12, 1977	Frank Turnbull	Spokane Flyers (WIHL)	
February 19, 1978	Gerry Pinder	San Diego Mariners	
March 1, 1978	Dale McMullin	Spokane Flyers (WIHL)	
March 1, 1978	Craig Topolnisky	Spokane Flyers (WIHL)	
March 5, 1978	Kevin Primeau	Alberta Golden Bears (CWUAA)	
March 7, 1978	Jim Cross	St. Albert Saints (AJHL)	
March 12, 1978	Ray McKay	Birmingham Bulls	

=== Players lost ===
Date	Player	New team
	Doug Barrie	Retired
	Randy Legge	Retired
	Bill Prentice	Indianapolis Racers
	Tom Simpson	Broome Dusters (AHL)
July 1977	Bobby Sheehan	Indianapolis Racers
November 1977	Frank Beaton	Birmingham Bulls
November 1, 1977	Ken Baird	Released
November 6, 1977	Lou Nistico	Colorado Rockies (NHL)
November 15, 1977	Gavin Kirk	Birmingham Bulls
December 1977	Ken Baird	Winnipeg Jets
December 1977	Del Hall	Retired
December 1977	Paul Stewart	Cincinnati Stingers
March 1, 1978	Robin Sadler	Nova Scotia Voyageurs (AHL)

=== Signings ===
Date	Player	Term
June 20, 1977	Robin Sadler	2-year
September 6, 1977	Norm Ferguson	
September 6, 1977	Paul Shmyr	
September 13, 1977	Dave Dryden	
September 21, 1977	Ron Busniuk	1-year
September 21, 1977	Al Hamilton	1-year
October 10, 1977	Warren Miller	1-year
October 12, 1977	Ken Baird	
October 23, 1977	Dave Semenko	2-year
December 2, 1977	Ab DeMarco	1-year
January 5, 1978	Jim Troy	
March 18, 1978	Cal Sandbeck	2-year
March 20, 1978	Owen Lloyd	

== Draft picks ==
Edmonton's draft picks at the 1977 WHA Amateur Draft.

Round	#	Player	Nationality	College/Junior/Club team (League)
1	4	Mike Crombeen (F)	Canada	Kingston Canadians (OHA)
1	11	Ron Areshenkoff (C)	Canada	Medicine Hat Tigers (WCHL)
3	24	Kim Davis (C)	Canada	Flin Flon Bombers (WCHL)
4	33	Neil LaBatte (D)	Canada	Toronto Marlboros (OHA)
4	34	Dan Clark (D)	Canada	Kamloops Chiefs (WCHL)
5	42	Rocky Saganiuk (RW)	Canada	Lethbridge Broncos (WCHL)
6	51	Julian Baretta (G)	United States	University of Wisconsin (WCHA)
7	60	Dave Hoyda (LW)	Canada	Portland Winter Hawks (WCHL)
8	69	Ray Creasy (F)	Canada	New Westminster Bruins (WCHL)
9	77	Guy Lash (RW)	Canada	Winnipeg Monarchs (WCHL)
10	85	Owen Lloyd (D)	Canada	Medicine Hat Tigers (WCHL)

== See also ==
- 1977–78 WHA season
