= 1977–78 Houston Aeros season =

World Hockey Association team season

1977–78 Houston Aeros
- League: 3rd WHA
- 1977–78 record: 42–34–4
- Home record: 24–13–2
- Road record: 18–21–2
- Goals for: 296
- Goals against: 302

Team information
- Coach: Bill Dineen
- Captain: Terry Ruskowski
- Alternate captains: Andre Lacroix; John Schella; Poul Popiel
- Arena: The Summit

Team leaders
- Goals: Morris Lukowich (40)
- Assists: Andre Lacroix (77)
- Points: Andre Lacroix (113)
- Penalty minutes: Cam Connor (217)
- Wins: Ernie Wakely (28)
- Goals against average: Ernie Wakely (3.24)

The 1977–78 Houston Aeros season was the Houston Aeros' sixth and final season of operation in the World Hockey Association (WHA). The Aeros again qualified for the playoffs, but lost in the first round to the Quebec Nordiques.

== Regular season ==
=== Final standings ===
Note: W = Wins, L = Losses, T = Ties, GF= Goals For, GA = Goals Against, Pts = Points

WHA Team	W	L	T	Pts	GF	GA	PIM
Winnipeg Jets	50	28	2	102	381	270	988
New England Whalers	44	31	5	93	335	269	1255
Houston Aeros	42	34	4	88	296	302	1543
Quebec Nordiques	40	37	3	83	349	347	1185
Edmonton Oilers	38	39	3	79	309	307	1296
Birmingham Bulls	36	41	3	75	287	314	2177
Cincinnati Stingers	35	42	3	73	298	332	1701
Indianapolis Racers	24	51	5	53	267	353	1189
Soviet All-Stars	3	4	1	7	27	36	120
Czechoslovakia All-Stars	1	6	1	3	21	40	87

== Schedule and results ==
1977–78 regular season
October: 3–4–0, 6 points (home: 3–1–0; road: 0–3–0)

Game	Result	Date	Score	Opponent	Record
1	L	October 12, 1977	0–3	New England Whalers (1977–78)	0–1–0
2	L	October 14, 1977	3–5	@ Birmingham Bulls (1977–78)	0–2–0
3	W	October 15, 1977	5–1	Indianapolis Racers (1977–78)	1–2–0
4	W	October 21, 1977	6–5	Cincinnati Stingers (1977–78)	2–2–0
5	W	October 26, 1977	8–7 OT	Edmonton Oilers (1977–78)	3–2–0
6	L	October 29, 1977	2–7	@ New England Whalers (1977–78)	3–3–0
7	L	October 30, 1977	4–5	@ Quebec Nordiques (1977–78)	3–4–0

November: 5–5–1, 11 points (home: 5–1–1; road: 0–4–0)

Game	Result	Date	Score	Opponent	Record
8	L	November 1, 1977	3–6	@ Indianapolis Racers (1977–78)	3–5–0
9	W	November 2, 1977	5–3	Birmingham Bulls (1977–78)	4–5–0
10	L	November 4, 1977	6–7	Quebec Nordiques (1977–78)	4–6–0
11	L	November 6, 1977	1–7	@ Edmonton Oilers (1977–78)	4–7–0
12	L	November 9, 1977	3–4	@ Winnipeg Jets (1977–78)	4–8–0
13	W	November 11, 1977	5–3	Indianapolis Racers (1977–78)	5–8–0
14	W	November 18, 1977	6–5	Quebec Nordiques (1977–78)	6–8–0
15	L	November 19, 1977	3–4	@ Birmingham Bulls (1977–78)	6–9–0
16	W	November 23, 1977	3–0	Birmingham Bulls (1977–78)	7–9–0
17	W	November 25, 1977	3–1	Cincinnati Stingers (1977–78)	8–9–0
18	T	November 30, 1977	3–3	New England Whalers (1977–78)	8–9–1

December: 6–6–2, 14 points (home: 2–4–1; road: 4–2–1)

Game	Result	Date	Score	Opponent	Record
19	L	December 2, 1977	2–4	Indianapolis Racers (1977–78)	8–10–1
20	W	December 4, 1977	3–2	@ Cincinnati Stingers (1977–78)	9–10–1
21	L	December 6, 1977	3–4 OT	@ Quebec Nordiques (1977–78)	9–11–1
22	L	December 7, 1977	2–5	@ Winnipeg Jets (1977–78)	9–12–1
23	W	December 9, 1977	5–3	@ Edmonton Oilers (1977–78)	10–12–1
24	W	December 11, 1977	4–2	@ Edmonton Oilers (1977–78)	11–12–1
25	L	December 13, 1977	3–5	Birmingham Bulls (1977–78)	11–13–1
26	T	December 15, 1977	3–3	@ Indianapolis Racers (1977–78)	11–13–2
27	W	December 18, 1977	3–2	Czechoslovakia (1977–78)	12–13–2
28	W	December 20, 1977	6–4	Edmonton Oilers (1977–78)	13–13–2
29	L	December 21, 1977	3–4	Winnipeg Jets (1977–78)	13–14–2
30	L	December 23, 1977	2–6	Soviet All-Stars (1977–78)	13–15–2
31	W	December 29, 1977	7–1	@ Indianapolis Racers (1977–78)	14–15–2
32	T	December 30, 1977	5–5	Cincinnati Stingers (1977–78)	14–15–3

January: 10–5–0, 20 points (home: 5–3–0; road: 5–2–0)

Game	Result	Date	Score	Opponent	Record
33	W	January 1, 1978	2–1	@ Edmonton Oilers (1977–78)	15–15–3
34	L	January 4, 1978	3–5	@ Cincinnati Stingers (1977–78)	15–16–3
35	L	January 6, 1978	4–6	@ Birmingham Bulls (1977–78)	15–17–3
36	L	January 7, 1978	1–2 OT	Indianapolis Racers (1977–78)	15–18–3
37	L	January 8, 1978	2–4	Edmonton Oilers (1977–78)	15–19–3
38	W	January 13, 1978	3–2	Winnipeg Jets (1977–78)	16–19–3
39	W	January 14, 1978	5–4 OT	@ New England Whalers (1977–78)	17–19–3
40	W	January 20, 1978	4–3	@ Indianapolis Racers (1977–78)	18–19–3
41	W	January 21, 1978	5–2	Cincinnati Stingers (1977–78)	19–19–3
42	W	January 22, 1978	4–2	Birmingham Bulls (1977–78)	20–19–3
43	W	January 24, 1978	6–5	@ Quebec Nordiques (1977–78)	21–19–3
44	W	January 26, 1978	2–1 OT	Winnipeg Jets (1977–78)	22–19–3
45	L	January 28, 1978	0–3	New England Whalers (1977–78)	22–20–3
46	W	January 29, 1978	6–4	New England Whalers (1977–78)	23–20–3
47	W	January 31, 1978	4–2	@ Birmingham Bulls (1977–78)	24–20–3

February: 6–7–0, 12 points (home: 3–3–0; road: 3–4–0)

Game	Result	Date	Score	Opponent	Record
48	L	February 3, 1978	0–1	@ Cincinnati Stingers (1977–78)	24–21–3
49	W	February 4, 1978	5–4	New England Whalers (1977–78)	25–21–3
50	W	February 9, 1978	2–1	Quebec Nordiques (1977–78)	26–21–3
51	W	February 11, 1978	8–4	Quebec Nordiques (1977–78)	27–21–3
52	L	February 12, 1978	5–6	Winnipeg Jets (1977–78)	27–22–3
53	W	February 15, 1978	5–2	@ Cincinnati Stingers (1977–78)	28–22–3
54	L	February 16, 1978	2–5	Birmingham Bulls (1977–78)	28–23–3
55	L	February 17, 1978	3–4 OT	Cincinnati Stingers (1977–78)	28–24–3
56	W	February 18, 1978	3–2	@ Birmingham Bulls (1977–78)	29–24–3
57	W	February 22, 1978	6–5	@ Edmonton Oilers (1977–78)	30–24–3
58	L	February 24, 1978	4–5 OT	@ Edmonton Oilers (1977–78)	30–25–3
59	L	February 26, 1978	6–9	@ Winnipeg Jets (1977–78)	30–26–3
60	L	February 28, 1978	2–5	@ Quebec Nordiques (1977–78)	30–27–3

March: 9–4–1, 19 points (home: 6–1–0; road: 3–3–1)

Game	Result	Date	Score	Opponent	Record
61	L	March 1, 1978	1–5	@ Indianapolis Racers (1977–78)	30–28–3
62	W	March 3, 1978	3–2 OT	@ New England Whalers (1977–78)	31–28–3
63	T	March 4, 1978	3–3	@ Quebec Nordiques (1977–78)	31–28–4
64	W	March 5, 1978	4–3	@ Winnipeg Jets (1977–78)	32–28–4
65	W	March 7, 1978	4–3	Edmonton Oilers (1977–78)	33–28–4
66	W	March 9, 1978	6–4	New England Whalers (1977–78)	34–28–4
67	L	March 11, 1978	2–4	@ Indianapolis Racers (1977–78)	34–29–4
68	W	March 12, 1978	6–3	Indianapolis Racers (1977–78)	35–29–4
69	L	March 17, 1978	2–3	Birmingham Bulls (1977–78)	35–30–4
70	L	March 22, 1978	2–9	@ Cincinnati Stingers (1977–78)	35–31–4
71	W	March 24, 1978	1–0	@ New England Whalers (1977–78)	36–31–4
72	W	March 25, 1978	4–3 OT	Quebec Nordiques (1977–78)	37–31–4
73	W	March 28, 1978	5–3	Winnipeg Jets (1977–78)	38–31–4
74	W	March 30, 1978	5–1	Edmonton Oilers (1977–78)	39–31–4

April: 3–3–0, 6 points (home: 2–0–0; road: 1–3–0)

Game	Result	Date	Score	Opponent	Record
75	L	April 2, 1978	1–7	@ Quebec Nordiques (1977–78)	39–32–4
76	L	April 3, 1978	6–8	@ New England Whalers (1977–78)	39–33–4
77	W	April 4, 1978	6–3	Winnipeg Jets (1977–78)	40–33–4
78	L	April 7, 1978	3–5	@ Birmingham Bulls (1977–78)	40–34–4
79	W	April 8, 1978	5–4	Cincinnati Stingers (1977–78)	41–34–4
80	W	April 9, 1978	5–4	@ Winnipeg Jets (1977–78)	42–34–4

Legend: Win (2 points) Loss (0 points) Tie (1 point)

== Playoffs ==
1978 Avco Cup playoffs
Quarterfinals vs. Quebec Nordiques – Nordiques win 4–2

Game	Date	Visitor	Score	Home	Series
1	April 16	Quebec Nordiques	3–4	Houston Aeros	1–0
2	April 18	Quebec Nordiques	5–4	Houston Aeros	1–1
3	April 20	Houston Aeros	1–5	Quebec Nordiques	1–2
4	April 21	Houston Aeros	0–3	Quebec Nordiques	1–3
5	April 23	Quebec Nordiques	2–5	Houston Aeros	2–3
6	April 25	Houston Aeros	2–11	Quebec Nordiques	2–4

Legend: Win Loss

== Player statistics ==
Scoring

Regular season
Player	Pos	GP	G	A	Pts	PIM	+/-	PPG	SHG	GWG
Andre Lacroix	C	78	36	77	113	57	8	7	0	0
Morris Lukowich	LW	80	40	35	75	131	13	13	0	0
Terry Ruskowski	C	78	15	57	72	170	13	3	1	0
John Tonelli	LW	65	23	41	64	103	13	5	0	0
Don Larway	RW	69	24	35	59	52	1	5	0	0
John Gray	RW	77	35	23	58	80	15	6	0	0
Rich Preston	RW	73	25	25	50	52	3	7	3	0
Cam Connor	RW	68	21	16	37	217	4	0	0	0
Scott Campbell	D	75	8	29	37	116	10	1	0	0
Poul Popiel	D	80	6	31	37	53	−6	1	1	0
Steve West	C	71	11	21	32	23	4	0	0	0
John Schella	D	63	9	20	29	125	−2	4	0	0
John Hughes	D	79	3	25	28	130	20	1	0	0
Larry Lund	C	76	9	17	26	36	−22	1	0	0
Al McLeod	D	80	2	22	24	54	18	0	0	0
Ron Hansis	RW	78	13	9	22	51	0	1	0	0
Ted Taylor	LW	54	11	11	22	46	8	1	1	0
Larry Hale	D	56	2	11	13	22	4	0	0	0
Frank Hughes	LW	11	3	2	5	2	−10	0	0	0
Ernie Wakely	G	51	0	4	4	2	0	0	0	0
Cleland Mortson	RW	6	0	1	1	7	−1	0	0	0
Glen Irwin	D	3	0	0	0	0	0	0	0	0
John Mazur	LW	1	0	0	0	0	−1	0	0	0
Wayne Rutledge	G	12	0	0	0	2	0	0	0	0
Lynn Zimmerman	G	20	0	0	0	4	0	0	0	0

Goaltending
Player	MIN	GP	W	L	T	GA	GAA	SO
Ernie Wakely	3070	51	28	18	4	166	3.24	2
Lynn Zimmerman	1166	20	10	9	0	84	4.32	0
Wayne Rutledge	634	12	4	7	0	47	4.45	0
Team:	4870	80	42	34	4	297	3.66	2

Player	Pos	GP	G	A	Pts	PIM	PPG	SHG	GWG
Ted Taylor	LW	6	3	1	4	10	0	0	1
Andre Lacroix	C	6	2	2	4	0	0	0	0
John Tonelli	LW	6	1	3	4	8	0	0	0
Don Larway	RW	6	1	2	3	4	0	0	0
Morris Lukowich	LW	6	1	2	3	17	0	0	0
John Gray	RW	6	0	3	3	10	0	0	0
Scott Campbell	D	6	1	1	2	8	0	0	1
Ron Hansis	RW	6	1	1	2	4	0	0	0
John Hughes	D	6	1	1	2	6	0	0	0
Terry Ruskowski	C	4	1	1	2	5	0	0	0
Paul Terbenche	D	6	1	1	2	0	0	0	0
Larry Lund	C	6	0	2	2	2	0	0	0
Poul Popiel	D	6	0	2	2	13	0	0	0
Cam Connor	RW	2	1	0	1	22	0	0	0
Al McLeod	D	6	1	0	1	2	0	0	0
Steve West	C	6	1	0	1	0	0	0	0
Cleland Mortson	RW	2	0	1	1	0	0	0	0
John Schella	D	6	0	1	1	33	0	0	0
Wayne Rutledge	G	3	0	0	0	2	0	0	0
Lynn Zimmerman	G	4	0	0	0	6	0	0	0

Player	MIN	GP	W	L	GA	GAA	SO
Wayne Rutledge	239	3	1	2	21	5.27	0
Lynn Zimmerman	131	4	1	2	8	3.66	0
Team:	370	6	2	4	29	4.70	0

Note: Pos = Position; GP = Games played; G = Goals; A = Assists; Pts = Points; +/- = plus/minus; PIM = Penalty minutes; PPG = Power-play goals; SHG = Short-handed goals; GWG = Game-winning goals
MIN = Minutes played; W = Wins; L = Losses; T = Ties; GA = Goals-against; GAA = Goals-against average; SO = Shutouts;

== Awards and records ==
- Ernie Wakely, WHA All-Star Team (Second Team)
- Bill Dineen, Howard Baldwin Trophy (Coach of the Year)

=== WHA All-Star Game (January 17, 1978) ===
- Morris Lukowich

== Draft picks ==
Houston's draft picks at the 1977 WHA Amateur Draft.

Round	#	Player	Nationality	College/Junior/Club team (League)
1	1	Scott Campbell (D)	Canada	London Knights (OHA)
1	10	Dwight Foster (F)	Canada	Kitchener Rangers (OHA)
2	21	Dave Semenko (LW)	Canada	Brandon Wheat Kings (WCHL)
3	30	Glen Hanlon (G)	Canada	Brandon Wheat Kings (WCHL)
4	39	Reg Kerr (D)	Canada	Kamloops Chiefs (WCHL)
5	48	Kevin McCarthy (D)	Canada	Winnipeg Monarchs (WCHL)
6	57	Markus Mattsson (G)	Finland	Ilves (Liiga)
7	66	Harald Luckner (F)	Sweden	Farjestads BK (Elitserien)
8	74	Matti Forss (F)	Finland	Lukko Rauma (Liiga)
9	82	Mike Dwyer (LW)	Canada	Niagara Falls Flyers (OHA)
10	90	Dave Parro (G)	Canada	Saskatoon Blades (WCHL)

== See also ==
- 1977–78 WHA season
