= 1977–78 Birmingham Bulls season =

World Hockey Association team season

1977–78 Birmingham Bulls
- League: 6th WHA
- 1977–78 record: 36–41–3
- Home record: 23–16–2
- Road record: 13–25–1
- Goals for: 287
- Goals against: 314

Team information
- Coach: Glen Sonmor, John F. Bassett
- Captain: Dale Hoganson
- Alternate captains: Paul Henderson; Brent Hughes
- Arena: Birmingham–Jefferson Convention Complex

Team leaders
- Goals: Ken Linseman (38)
- Assists: Peter Marrin (43)
- Points: Ken Linseman (76)
- Penalty minutes: Steve Durbano (284)
- Wins: John Garrett (24)
- Goals against average: John Garrett (3.81)

The 1977–78 Birmingham Bulls season was the Birmingham Bulls second season of operation in the World Hockey Association. The Bulls qualified for the playoffs, losing in the quarter-finals to the Winnipeg Jets.

== Regular season ==
=== Final standings ===
Note: W = Wins, L = Losses, T = Ties, GF= Goals For, GA = Goals Against, Pts = Points

WHA Team	W	L	T	Pts	GF	GA	PIM
Winnipeg Jets	50	28	2	102	381	270	988
New England Whalers	44	31	5	93	335	269	1255
Houston Aeros	42	34	4	88	296	302	1543
Quebec Nordiques	40	37	3	83	349	347	1185
Edmonton Oilers	38	39	3	79	309	307	1296
Birmingham Bulls	36	41	3	75	287	314	2177
Cincinnati Stingers	35	42	3	73	298	332	1701
Indianapolis Racers	24	51	5	53	267	353	1189
Soviet All-Stars	3	4	1	7	27	36	120
Czechoslovakia All-Stars	1	6	1	3	21	40	87

== Schedule and results ==
1977–78 regular season
October

Game	Result	Date	Score	Opponent	Record
1	W	October 14, 1977	5–3	Houston Aeros (1977–78)	1–0–0
2	L	October 15, 1977	2–5	@ New England Whalers (1977–78)	1–1–0
3	L	October 22, 1977	5–8	@ Quebec Nordiques (1977–78)	1–2–0
4	L	October 23, 1977	3–10	@ Winnipeg Jets (1977–78)	1–3–0
5	L	October 25, 1977	4–5	Indianapolis Racers (1977–78)	1–4–0
6	L	October 28, 1977	2–3	Edmonton Oilers (1977–78)	1–5–0
7	L	October 29, 1977	2–6	@ Indianapolis Racers (1977–78)	1–6–0

November

Game	Result	Date	Score	Opponent	Record
8	L	November 2, 1977	3–5	@ Houston Aeros (1977–78)	1–7–0
9	L	November 4, 1977	2–4	Winnipeg Jets (1977–78)	1–8–0
10	W	November 5, 1977	5–4 OT	Quebec Nordiques (1977–78)	2–8–0
11	L	November 8, 1977	3–4	New England Whalers (1977–78)	2–9–0
12	L	November 9, 1977	1–2	@ Cincinnati Stingers (1977–78)	2–10–0
13	T	November 12, 1977	1–1	Edmonton Oilers (1977–78)	2–10–1
14	T	November 16, 1977	2–2	@ Winnipeg Jets (1977–78)	2–10–2
15	W	November 18, 1977	2–1	@ Indianapolis Racers (1977–78)	3–10–2
16	W	November 19, 1977	4–3	Houston Aeros (1977–78)	4–10–2
17	L	November 23, 1977	0–3	@ Houston Aeros (1977–78)	4–11–2
18	W	November 24, 1977	12–2	Cincinnati Stingers (1977–78)	5–11–2
19	L	November 26, 1977	2–4	@ Quebec Nordiques (1977–78)	5–12–2
20	W	November 27, 1977	4–3 OT	@ Winnipeg Jets (1977–78)	6–12–2
21	L	November 30, 1977	2–4	@ Edmonton Oilers (1977–78)	6–13–2

December

Game	Result	Date	Score	Opponent	Record
22	W	December 2, 1977	7–5	@ Edmonton Oilers (1977–78)	7–13–2
23	W	December 4, 1977	3–0	Indianapolis Racers (1977–78)	8–13–2
24	L	December 7, 1977	3–6	New England Whalers (1977–78)	8–14–2
25	L	December 9, 1977	1–2 OT	New England Whalers (1977–78)	8–15–2
26	W	December 13, 1977	5–3	@ Houston Aeros (1977–78)	9–15–2
27	W	December 15, 1977	5–3	Cincinnati Stingers (1977–78)	10–15–2
28	W	December 18, 1977	3–2	Edmonton Oilers (1977–78)	11–15–2
29	W	December 21, 1977	5–0	Czechoslovakia (1977–78)	12–15–2
30	W	December 26, 1977	6–1	Soviet All-Stars (1977–78)	13–15–2
31	L	December 27, 1977	1–8	@ New England Whalers (1977–78)	13–16–2
32	W	December 29, 1977	7–1	@ Cincinnati Stingers (1977–78)	14–16–2
33	L	December 30, 1977	2–6	@ New England Whalers (1977–78)	14–17–2

January

Game	Result	Date	Score	Opponent	Record
34	L	January 1, 1978	2–5	Quebec Nordiques (1977–78)	14–18–2
35	L	January 4, 1978	1–4	@ Indianapolis Racers (1977–78)	14–19–2
36	W	January 6, 1978	6–4	Houston Aeros (1977–78)	15–19–2
37	W	January 8, 1978	5–4	@ New England Whalers (1977–78)	16–19–2
38	L	January 10, 1978	4–6	@ Quebec Nordiques (1977–78)	16–20–2
39	L	January 11, 1978	2–11	@ Winnipeg Jets (1977–78)	16–21–2
40	W	January 14, 1978	4–3	@ Cincinnati Stingers (1977–78)	17–21–2
41	W	January 18, 1978	3–0	Cincinnati Stingers (1977–78)	18–21–2
42	W	January 20, 1978	5–3	Edmonton Oilers (1977–78)	19–21–2
43	L	January 22, 1978	2–4	@ Houston Aeros (1977–78)	19–22–2
44	W	January 25, 1978	6–2	Winnipeg Jets (1977–78)	20–22–2
45	L	January 27, 1978	2–6	New England Whalers (1977–78)	20–23–2
46	W	January 28, 1978	8–5	Winnipeg Jets (1977–78)	21–23–2
47	L	January 31, 1978	2–4	Houston Aeros (1977–78)	21–24–2

February

Game	Result	Date	Score	Opponent	Record
48	L	February 2, 1978	2–4	Quebec Nordiques (1977–78)	21–25–2
49	W	February 4, 1978	5–2	Indianapolis Racers (1977–78)	22–25–2
50	L	February 5, 1978	1–6	@ Indianapolis Racers (1977–78)	22–26–2
51	L	February 7, 1978	3–8	@ Quebec Nordiques (1977–78)	22–27–2
52	L	February 8, 1978	0–9	@ Winnipeg Jets (1977–78)	22–28–2
53	L	February 12, 1978	0–7	@ Edmonton Oilers (1977–78)	22–29–2
54	L	February 14, 1978	1–4	@ Edmonton Oilers (1977–78)	22–30–2
55	W	February 16, 1978	5–2	@ Houston Aeros (1977–78)	23–30–2
56	W	February 17, 1978	5–4 OT	Indianapolis Racers (1977–78)	24–30–2
57	L	February 18, 1978	2–3	Houston Aeros (1977–78)	24–31–2
58	L	February 19, 1978	3–4 OT	@ Cincinnati Stingers (1977–78)	24–32–2
59	W	February 23, 1978	7–3	Quebec Nordiques (1977–78)	25–32–2
60	W	February 25, 1978	7–3	Cincinnati Stingers (1977–78)	26–32–2
61	L	February 26, 1978	3–6	Indianapolis Racers (1977–78)	26–33–2

March

Game	Result	Date	Score	Opponent	Record
62	W	March 1, 1978	4–3	Winnipeg Jets (1977–78)	27–33–2
63	W	March 4, 1978	5–2	@ New England Whalers (1977–78)	28–33–2
64	L	March 5, 1978	3–4	Edmonton Oilers (1977–78)	28–34–2
65	W	March 9, 1978	9–2	Quebec Nordiques (1977–78)	29–34–2
66	L	March 10, 1978	4–5 OT	New England Whalers (1977–78)	29–35–2
67	L	March 12, 1978	2–3	@ Winnipeg Jets (1977–78)	29–36–2
68	L	March 14, 1978	0–6	@ New England Whalers (1977–78)	29–37–2
69	L	March 15, 1978	2–7	@ Cincinnati Stingers (1977–78)	29–38–2
70	W	March 17, 1978	3–2	@ Houston Aeros (1977–78)	30–38–2
71	T	March 19, 1978	3–3	Indianapolis Racers (1977–78)	30–38–3
72	W	March 21, 1978	5–4	@ Quebec Nordiques (1977–78)	31–38–3
73	W	March 22, 1978	5–3	@ Edmonton Oilers (1977–78)	32–38–3
74	L	March 24, 1978	3–4 OT	Quebec Nordiques (1977–78)	32–39–3
75	L	March 25, 1978	1–3	Winnipeg Jets (1977–78)	32–40–3
76	W	March 31, 1978	5–2	Edmonton Oilers (1977–78)	33–40–3

April

Game	Result	Date	Score	Opponent	Record
77	W	April 1, 1978	5–1	Cincinnati Stingers (1977–78)	34–40–3
78	L	April 5, 1978	4–5	@ Cincinnati Stingers (1977–78)	34–41–3
79	W	April 7, 1978	5–3	Houston Aeros (1977–78)	35–41–3
80	W	April 9, 1978	9–7	@ Indianapolis Racers (1977–78)	36–41–3

Legend: Win (2 points) Loss (0 points) Tie (1 point)

== Playoffs ==
1978 Avco Cup playoffs
Quarterfinals vs. Winnipeg Jets – Jets win 4–1

Game	Date	Visitor	Score	Home	Series
1	April 14	Birmingham Bulls	3–9	Winnipeg Jets	1–0
2	April 16	Birmingham Bulls	3–8	Winnipeg Jets	2–0
3	April 19	Winnipeg Jets	2–3	Birmingham Bulls	2–1
4	April 21	Winnipeg Jets	5–1	Birmingham Bulls	3–1
5	April 23	Birmingham Bulls	2–5	Winnipeg Jets	4–1

Legend: Win Loss

== Player statistics ==
Regular season
Scoring

Player	Pos	GP	G	A	Pts	PIM	+/-	PPG	SHG	GWG
Ken Linseman	C	71	38	38	76	126	6	5	4	0
Peter Marrin	C	80	28	43	71	53	9	7	1	0
Paul Henderson	RW	80	37	29	66	22	4	11	1	0
Mark Napier	RW	79	33	32	65	90	−11	14	0	0
Brent Hughes	D	80	9	35	44	48	12	3	0	0
Tony Cassolato	RW	77	18	25	43	59	−3	4	0	0
Dave Gorman	RW	63	19	21	40	93	18	2	0	0
John Stewart	C	48	13	26	39	52	13	2	1	0
Frank Mahovlich	LW	72	14	24	38	22	−5	6	0	0
Serge Beaudoin	D	64	8	25	33	105	14	1	0	0
Joe Noris	C/D	45	9	19	28	6	−9	0	0	0
Phil Roberto	RW	53	8	20	28	91	7	0	0	0
Jim Turkiewicz	D	78	3	21	24	45	10	0	0	0
Dave Hanson	D	42	7	16	23	241	10	0	0	0
Rod Langway	D	52	3	18	21	52	10	0	0	0
Steve Alley	LW	27	8	12	20	11	17	1	0	0
Frank Beaton	LW	56	6	9	15	279	−8	0	1	0
Bob Stephenson	RW	39	7	6	13	33	−2	0	0	0
Dale Hoganson	D	43	1	12	13	29	−6	0	0	0
Pat Westrum	D	77	2	10	12	97	−7	0	0	0
Steve Durbano	D	45	6	4	10	284	−12	1	0	0
Tim Sheehy	RW	13	4	2	6	5	−14	2	0	0
Vaclav Nedomansky	RW	12	2	3	5	6	−9	1	0	0
Gilles Bilodeau	LW	59	2	2	4	258	−14	0	0	0
Chris Evans	D	12	1	2	3	4	−7	0	0	0
John Garrett	G	58	0	3	3	26	0	0	0	0
Wayne Wood	G	32	0	3	3	22	0	0	0	0
Paul Terbenche	D	11	1	0	1	0	1	0	0	0
Danny Arndt	LW	4	0	1	1	0	1	0	0	0

Goaltending

Player	MIN	GP	W	L	T	GA	GAA	SO
John Garrett	3306	58	24	31	1	210	3.81	2
Wayne Wood	1551	32	12	10	2	99	3.83	1
Team:	4857	80	36	41	3	309	3.82	3

Playoffs
Scoring

Player	Pos	GP	G	A	Pts	PIM	PPG	SHG	GWG
Ken Linseman	C	5	2	2	4	15	0	0	0
Peter Marrin	C	5	0	3	3	2	0	0	0
Frank Beaton	LW	5	2	0	2	10	0	0	0
Dave Gorman	RW	4	1	1	2	0	0	0	0
Paul Henderson	RW	5	1	1	2	0	0	0	0
Frank Mahovlich	LW	3	1	1	2	0	0	0	0
John Stewart	C	5	1	1	2	6	0	0	1
Jim Turkiewicz	D	5	1	1	2	0	0	0	0
Steve Durbano	D	4	0	2	2	16	0	0	0
Mark Napier	RW	5	0	2	2	14	0	0	0
Steve Alley	LW	5	1	0	1	5	0	0	0
Serge Beaudoin	D	5	1	0	1	46	0	0	0
Phil Roberto	RW	4	1	0	1	20	0	0	0
Dave Hanson	D	5	0	1	1	48	0	0	0
Pat Westrum	D	3	0	1	1	2	0	0	0
Gilles Bilodeau	LW	3	0	0	0	27	0	0	0
Tony Cassolato	RW	4	0	0	0	4	0	0	0
John Garrett	G	5	0	0	0	0	0	0	0
Dale Hoganson	D	5	0	0	0	7	0	0	0
Brent Hughes	D	5	0	0	0	12	0	0	0
Rod Langway	D	4	0	0	0	9	0	0	0
Wayne Wood	G	1	0	0	0	0	0	0	0

Goaltending

Player	MIN	GP	W	L	GA	GAA	SO
John Garrett	271	5	1	4	26	5.76	0
Wayne Wood	29	1	0	0	3	6.21	0
Team:	300	5	1	4	29	5.80	0

Note: Pos = Position; GP = Games played; G = Goals; A = Assists; Pts = Points; +/- = plus/minus; PIM = Penalty minutes; PPG = Power-play goals; SHG = Short-handed goals; GWG = Game-winning goals
MIN = Minutes played; W = Wins; L = Losses; T = Ties; GA = Goals-against; GAA = Goals-against average; SO = Shutouts;

== Draft picks ==
Birmingham's draft picks at the 1977 WHA Amateur Draft.

Round	#	Player	Nationality	College/Junior/Club team (League)
1	6	Rod Langway (D)	United States	University of New Hampshire (ECAC)
2	12	Brad Maxwell (D)	Canada	New Westminster Bruins (WCHL)
3	22	Mark Johnson (F)	United States	University of Wisconsin (WCHA)
4	31	Norm Dupont (LW)	Canada	Montreal Juniors (QMJHL)
5	40	Steve Baker (G)	United States	Union College (ECAC-2)
6	49	Greg Tebbutt (D)	Canada	Regina Pats (WCHL)
7	58	Bob Suter (D)	United States	University of Wisconsin (WCHA)
8	67	Curt Christopherson (D)	United States	Colorado College (WCHA)
9	75	Jean Savard (F)	Canada	Quebec Remparts (QMJHL)
10	83	Ken Linseman (F)	Canada	Kingston Canadians (OHA)

== See also ==
- 1977–78 NHL season
