= 1977–78 Winnipeg Jets season =

NHA hockey team season

1977–78 Winnipeg Jets
- Avco Cup champions
- Division: 1st WHA
- 1977–78 record: 50–28–2
- Home record: 28–11–2
- Road record: 22–17–0
- Goals for: 381
- Goals against: 270

Team information
- General manager: Rudy Pilous
- Coach: Larry Hillman
- Captain: Lars-Erik Sjoberg
- Alternate captains: Ted Green; Anders Hedberg
- Arena: Winnipeg Arena

Team leaders
- Goals: Anders Hedberg (63)
- Assists: Ulf Nilsson (89)
- Points: Ulf Nilsson (126)
- Penalty minutes: Kim Clackson (203)
- Wins: Gary Bromley (25)
- Goals against average: Gary Bromley; Joe Daley (3.30)

The 1977–78 Winnipeg Jets season was the Jets' sixth season of operation in the World Hockey Association (WHA). The Jets, finalists in 1977, qualified first for the playoffs with a dominant season of 50 wins, which included a perfect month of 13 wins in February. In the 1978 WHA playoffs, they won the Avco World Trophy over the New England Whalers in the Final for the second championship in Jets history.

== Regular season ==
=== Final standings ===
Note: W = Wins, L = Losses, T = Ties, GF= Goals For, GA = Goals Against, Pts = Points

WHA Team	W	L	T	Pts	GF	GA	PIM
Winnipeg Jets	50	28	2	102	381	270	988
New England Whalers	44	31	5	93	335	269	1255
Houston Aeros	42	34	4	88	296	302	1543
Quebec Nordiques	40	37	3	83	349	347	1185
Edmonton Oilers	38	39	3	79	309	307	1296
Birmingham Bulls	36	41	3	75	287	314	2177
Cincinnati Stingers	35	42	3	73	298	332	1701
Indianapolis Racers	24	51	5	53	267	353	1189
Soviet All-Stars	3	4	1	7	27	36	120
Czechoslovakia All-Stars	1	6	1	3	21	40	87

== Schedule and results ==
1977–78 regular season
October: 7–2–0, 14 points (home: 5–1–0; road: 2–1–0)

Game	Result	Date	Score	Opponent	Record
1	W	October 12, 1977	7–3	@ Edmonton Oilers (1977–78)	1–0–0
2	W	October 13, 1977	5–2	Quebec Nordiques (1977–78)	2–0–0
3	W	October 15, 1977	5–4	@ Cincinnati Stingers (1977–78)	3–0–0
4	W	October 16, 1977	9–1	Indianapolis Racers (1977–78)	4–0–0
5	L	October 21, 1977	2–5	New England Whalers (1977–78)	4–1–0
6	W	October 23, 1977	10–3	Birmingham Bulls (1977–78)	5–1–0
7	L	October 26, 1977	3–5	@ Indianapolis Racers (1977–78)	5–2–0
8	W	October 28, 1977	3–2	Cincinnati Stingers (1977–78)	6–2–0
9	W	October 30, 1977	5–2	Edmonton Oilers (1977–78)	7–2–0

November: 5–6–1, 11 points (home: 1–3–1; road: 4–3–0)

Game	Result	Date	Score	Opponent	Record
10	W	November 2, 1977	6–3	@ Edmonton Oilers (1977–78)	8–2–0
11	W	November 4, 1977	4–2	@ Birmingham Bulls (1977–78)	9–2–0
12	W	November 5, 1977	6–1	@ Cincinnati Stingers (1977–78)	10–2–0
13	W	November 9, 1977	4–3	Houston Aeros (1977–78)	11–2–0
14	L	November 11, 1977	2–3 OT	Quebec Nordiques (1977–78)	11–3–0
15	L	November 13, 1977	2–3	Cincinnati Stingers (1977–78)	11–4–0
16	L	November 15, 1977	6–7 OT	@ Quebec Nordiques (1977–78)	11–5–0
17	T	November 16, 1977	2–2	Birmingham Bulls (1977–78)	11–5–1
18	L	November 18, 1977	2–3	@ New England Whalers (1977–78)	11–6–1
19	W	November 19, 1977	6–4	@ Indianapolis Racers (1977–78)	12–6–1
20	L	November 22, 1977	2–4	@ Edmonton Oilers (1977–78)	12–7–1
21	L	November 27, 1977	3–4 OT	Birmingham Bulls (1977–78)	12–8–1

December: 9–4–0, 18 points (home: 6–2–0; road: 3–2–0)

Game	Result	Date	Score	Opponent	Record
22	L	December 2, 1977	1–4	@ New England Whalers (1977–78)	12–9–1
23	L	December 3, 1977	5–6	@ Quebec Nordiques (1977–78)	12–10–1
24	L	December 4, 1977	2–3	Edmonton Oilers (1977–78)	12–11–1
25	W	December 7, 1977	5–2	Houston Aeros (1977–78)	13–11–1
26	L	December 9, 1977	3–4 OT	Cincinnati Stingers (1977–78)	13–12–1
27	W	December 11, 1977	7–1	Indianapolis Racers (1977–78)	14–12–1
28	W	December 13, 1977	5–1	Czechoslovakia (1977–78)	15–12–1
29	W	December 17, 1977	6–3	@ New England Whalers (1977–78)	16–12–1
30	W	December 18, 1977	7–3	New England Whalers (1977–78)	17–12–1
31	W	December 20, 1977	6–4	Soviet All-Stars (1977–78)	18–12–1
32	W	December 21, 1977	4–3	@ Houston Aeros (1977–78)	19–12–1
33	W	December 23, 1977	6–4	@ Cincinnati Stingers (1977–78)	20–12–1
34	W	December 26, 1977	9–4	Quebec Nordiques (1977–78)	21–12–1

January: 7–6–1, 15 points (home: 3–2–1; road: 4–4–0)

Game	Result	Date	Score	Opponent	Record
35	W	January 6, 1978	4–1	@ Edmonton Oilers (1977–78)	22–12–1
36	W	January 8, 1978	4–2	Indianapolis Racers (1977–78)	23–12–1
37	W	January 11, 1978	11–2	Birmingham Bulls (1977–78)	24–12–1
38	L	January 13, 1978	2–3	@ Houston Aeros (1977–78)	24–13–1
39	W	January 14, 1978	6–3	@ Indianapolis Racers (1977–78)	25–13–1
40	L	January 15, 1978	3–4 OT	Edmonton Oilers (1977–78)	25–14–1
41	W	January 18, 1978	5–1	Quebec Nordiques (1977–78)	26–14–1
42	T	January 20, 1978	4–4	New England Whalers (1977–78)	26–14–2
43	L	January 22, 1978	4–5	Indianapolis Racers (1977–78)	26–15–2
44	L	January 25, 1978	2–6	@ Birmingham Bulls (1977–78)	26–16–2
45	L	January 26, 1978	1–2 OT	@ Houston Aeros (1977–78)	26–17–2
46	L	January 28, 1978	5–8	@ Birmingham Bulls (1977–78)	26–18–2
47	W	January 29, 1978	8–4	@ Cincinnati Stingers (1977–78)	27–18–2
48	W	January 31, 1978	7–2	@ Quebec Nordiques (1977–78)	28–18–2

February: 13–0–0, 26 points (home: 8–0–0; road: 5–0–0)

Game	Result	Date	Score	Opponent	Record
49	W	February 4, 1978	7–5	@ Cincinnati Stingers (1977–78)	29–18–2
50	W	February 5, 1978	4–3	Edmonton Oilers (1977–78)	30–18–2
51	W	February 8, 1978	9–0	Birmingham Bulls (1977–78)	31–18–2
52	W	February 10, 1978	10–2	Cincinnati Stingers (1977–78)	32–18–2
53	W	February 11, 1978	5–3	@ Indianapolis Racers (1977–78)	33–18–2
54	W	February 12, 1978	6–5	@ Houston Aeros (1977–78)	34–18–2
55	W	February 15, 1978	6–5	Edmonton Oilers (1977–78)	35–18–2
56	W	February 16, 1978	2–1 OT	@ New England Whalers (1977–78)	36–18–2
57	W	February 18, 1978	4–0	@ Cincinnati Stingers (1977–78)	37–18–2
58	W	February 19, 1978	5–2	Quebec Nordiques (1977–78)	38–18–2
59	W	February 22, 1978	4–2	New England Whalers (1977–78)	39–18–2
60	W	February 24, 1978	7–2	New England Whalers (1977–78)	40–18–2
61	W	February 26, 1978	9–6	Houston Aeros (1977–78)	41–18–2

March: 8–6–0, 16 points (home: 4–2–0; road: 4–4–0)

Game	Result	Date	Score	Opponent	Record
62	L	March 1, 1978	3–4	@ Birmingham Bulls (1977–78)	41–19–2
63	L	March 3, 1978	1–5	Cincinnati Stingers (1977–78)	41–20–2
64	L	March 4, 1978	6–8	@ Indianapolis Racers (1977–78)	41–21–2
65	L	March 5, 1978	3–4	Houston Aeros (1977–78)	41–22–2
66	W	March 9, 1978	6–5	Indianapolis Racers (1977–78)	42–22–2
67	W	March 11, 1978	7–4	@ Quebec Nordiques (1977–78)	43–22–2
68	W	March 12, 1978	3–2	Birmingham Bulls (1977–78)	44–22–2
69	W	March 15, 1978	8–4	Edmonton Oilers (1977–78)	45–22–2
70	L	March 17, 1978	2–6	@ Edmonton Oilers (1977–78)	45–23–2
71	W	March 19, 1978	5–3	Quebec Nordiques (1977–78)	46–23–2
72	W	March 22, 1978	5–3	@ New England Whalers (1977–78)	47–23–2
73	W	March 25, 1978	3–1	@ Birmingham Bulls (1977–78)	48–23–2
74	L	March 28, 1978	3–5	@ Houston Aeros (1977–78)	48–24–2
75	W	March 30, 1978	4–1	@ Indianapolis Racers (1977–78)	49–24–2

April: 1–4–0, 2 points (home: 1–1–0; road: 0–3–0)

Game	Result	Date	Score	Opponent	Record
76	L	April 1, 1978	2–5	@ Quebec Nordiques (1977–78)	49–25–2
77	L	April 4, 1978	3–6	@ Houston Aeros (1977–78)	49–26–2
78	W	April 6, 1978	7–4	New England Whalers (1977–78)	50–26–2
79	L	April 7, 1978	2–4	@ Edmonton Oilers (1977–78)	50–27–2
80	L	April 9, 1978	4–5	Houston Aeros (1977–78)	50–28–2

Legend: Win (2 points) Loss (0 points) Tie (1 point)

== Playoffs ==
Due to their victory over the Bulls, they earned a bye to the Finals while the other two Semifinal winners faced off against each other.

1978 Avco Cup playoffs
Quarterfinals vs. (6) Birmingham Bulls – Jets win 4–1

Game	Date	Visitor	Score	Home	Series
1	April 14	Birmingham Bulls	3–9	Winnipeg Jets	1–0
2	April 16	Birmingham Bulls	3–8	Winnipeg Jets	2–0
3	April 19	Winnipeg Jets	2–3	Birmingham Bulls	2–1
4	April 21	Winnipeg Jets	5–1	Birmingham Bulls	3–1
5	April 23	Birmingham Bulls	2–5	Winnipeg Jets	4–1

Avco Cup Finals vs. (2) New England Whalers – Jets win 4–0

Game	Date	Visitor	Score	Home	Series
1	May 12	New England Whalers	1–4	Winnipeg Jets	1–0
2	May 14	New England Whalers	2–5	Winnipeg Jets	2–0
3	May 19	Winnipeg Jets	10–2	New England Whalers	3–0
4	May 22	Winnipeg Jets	5–3	New England Whalers	4–0

Legend: Win Loss

== Player statistics ==
=== Regular season ===
Scoring

Regular season
Player	Pos	GP	G	A	Pts	PIM	+/-	PPG	SHG
Ulf Nilsson	C	73	37	89	126	89	41	7	3
Anders Hedberg	RW	77	63	59	122	60	60	17	6
Bobby Hull	LW	77	46	71	117	23	55	10	0
Kent Nilsson	C	80	42	65	107	8	27	18	0
Willy Lindstrom	RW	77	30	30	60	42	4	7	0
Peter Sullivan	C	77	16	39	55	43	−12	3	1
Lars-Erik Sjoberg	D	78	11	39	50	72	60	0	1
Bobby Guindon	LW	77	20	22	42	18	−1	0	4
Dave Kryskow	LW	71	20	21	41	16	12	3	0
Dan Labraaten	LW	47	18	16	34	30	7	5	0
Thommie Bergman	D	62	5	28	33	43	22	0	0
Lynn Powis	C	55	12	19	31	16	2	2	0
Barry Long	D	78	7	24	31	42	10	1	1
Bill Lesuk	LW	80	9	18	27	48	−4	0	0
Dave Dunn	D	66	6	20	26	79	20	1	0
Ted Green	D	73	4	22	26	52	19	2	0
Lyle Moffat	LW	57	9	16	25	39	−6	0	0
Ken Baird	D	49	14	7	21	29	5	2	0
Kent Ruhnke	RW	21	8	9	17	2	9	0	0
Kim Clackson	D	52	2	7	9	203	6	0	0
Larry Hornung	D	19	1	4	5	2	17	0	0
Mike Amodeo	D	3	1	1	2	0	3	0	0
Joe Daley	G	37	0	2	2	2	0	0	0
Gary Bromley	G	39	0	1	1	4	0	0	0
Bill Davis	D	12	0	0	0	2	−9	0	0
Mike Ford	D	3	0	0	0	0	−5	0	0
Fran Huck	C	5	0	0	0	2	−2	0	0
Markus Mattsson	G	10	0	0	0	0	0	0	0

Goaltending

Player	MIN	GP	W	L	T	GA	GAA	SO
Gary Bromley	2252	39	25	12	1	124	3.30	1
Joe Daley	2075	37	21	11	1	114	3.30	1
Markus Mattsson	511	10	4	5	0	30	3.52	0
Team:	4838	80	50	28	2	268	3.32	2

=== Playoffs ===
Scoring

Player	Pos	GP	G	A	Pts	PIM	GWG
Anders Hedberg	RW	9	9	6	15	2	1
Ulf Nilsson	C	9	1	13	14	12	0
Bobby Guindon	LW	9	8	5	13	5	2
Lyle Moffat	LW	9	5	7	12	9	0
Bobby Hull	LW	9	8	3	11	12	2
Kent Nilsson	C	9	2	8	10	10	0
Lars-Erik Sjoberg	D	9	0	9	9	4	0
Dave Kryskow	LW	9	4	4	8	2	1
Willy Lindstrom	RW	8	3	4	7	17	0
Peter Sullivan	C	9	3	4	7	4	1
Bill Lesuk	LW	9	2	5	7	12	0
Barry Long	D	9	0	5	5	6	0
Mike Amodeo	D	7	1	3	4	19	0
Ken Baird	D	7	0	4	4	7	0
Lynn Powis	C	3	2	1	3	7	0
Dave Dunn	D	9	1	2	3	0	0
Kent Ruhnke	RW	5	2	0	2	0	1
Dan Labraaten	LW	4	1	1	2	8	0
Ted Green	D	8	0	2	2	2	0
Mike Ford	D	2	1	0	1	0	0
Kim Clackson	D	9	0	1	1	61	0
Joe Daley	G	5	0	1	1	20	0
Gary Bromley	G	5	0	0	0	2	0

Goaltending

Player	MIN	GP	W	L	GA	GAA	SO
Gary Bromley	268	5	4	0	7	1.57	0
Joe Daley	271	5	4	1	13	2.88	0
Team:	539	9	8	1	20	2.23	0

Note:

Pos = Position;GP = Games played; G = Goals; A = Assists; Pts = Points; PIM = Penalty minutes; +/- = Plus/minus; PPG = Power-play goals; SHG = Short-handed goals; GWG = Game-winning goals
Pos = Position;GP = Games played; Min, TOI = Minutes played; W = Wins; L = Losses; T,T/OT = Ties; OTL = Overtime losses; GA = Goals-against; GAA = Goals-against average; SO = Shutouts; SA = Shots against; SV = Shots saved;SV% = Save percentage;

== Draft picks ==
Winnipeg's draft picks at the 1977 WHA Amateur Draft.

Round	#	Player	Nationality	College/Junior/Club team (League)
1	3	Ron Duguay (C)	Canada	Sudbury Wolves (OHA)
1	8	Miles Zaharko (D)	Canada	New Westminster Bruins (WCHL)
3	28	Mark Lofthouse (RW)	Canada	New Westminster Bruins (WCHL)
4	37	Don Laurence (C)	Canada	Kitchener Rangers (OHA)
5	46	Bill Stewart (D)	Canada	Niagara Falls Flyers (OHA)
6	55	Ric Seiling (RW)	Canada	St. Catharines Fincups (OHA)
7	64	Jim Hamilton (LW)	Canada	London Knights (OHA)
8	72	Warren Holmes (C)	Canada	Ottawa 67's (OHA)
9	80	Mike Keating (LW)	Canada	St. Catharines Fincups (OHA)
10	88	Murray Bannerman (G)	Canada	Victoria Cougars (WCHL)

== See also ==
- 1977–78 WHA season
