= 1977–78 New England Whalers season =

World Hockey Association team season

1977–78 New England Whalers
- Division: 2nd WHA
- 1977–78 record: 44–31–5
- Home record: 26–14–1
- Road record: 18–17–4
- Goals for: 335
- Goals against: 269

Team information
- General manager: Jack Kelley
- Coach: Harry Neale
- Captain: Rick Ley
- Arena: Hartford Civic Center (23 games); Springfield Civic Center (18 games)

Team leaders
- Goals: Gordie Howe (34)
- Assists: Gordie Howe (62)
- Points: Gordie Howe (96)
- Penalty minutes: Jack Carlson (192)
- Wins: Al Smith (30)
- Goals against average: Al Smith (3.22)

The 1977–78 New England Whalers season was the Whalers' sixth season of operation in the World Hockey Association (WHA). This season saw the debut of Gordie Howe and his sons with the Whalers' franchise. On December 7, 1977, playing against the Birmingham Bulls at BJCC Coliseum in the first period, Howe became the first player to score 1,000 professional goals, doing so off goaltender John Garrett at 1:36 in the first period off assists by John McKenzie and Mike Antonovich.

On the early morning of January 18, 1978, the roof at the Hartford Civic Center collapsed. The team played their remaining home games at Springfield Civic Center in Springfield, Massachusetts. The Howe trio helped the Whalers advance to the Avco Cup Finals, where they were defeated by the Winnipeg Jets.

== Regular season ==
=== Final standings ===
Note: W = Wins, L = Losses, T = Ties, GF= Goals For, GA = Goals Against, Pts = Points

WHA Team	W	L	T	Pts	GF	GA	PIM
Winnipeg Jets	50	28	2	102	381	270	988
New England Whalers	44	31	5	93	335	269	1255
Houston Aeros	42	34	4	88	296	302	1543
Quebec Nordiques	40	37	3	83	349	347	1185
Edmonton Oilers	38	39	3	79	309	307	1296
Birmingham Bulls	36	41	3	75	287	314	2177
Cincinnati Stingers	35	42	3	73	298	332	1701
Indianapolis Racers	24	51	5	53	267	353	1189
Soviet All-Stars	3	4	1	7	27	36	120
Czechoslovakia All-Stars	1	6	1	3	21	40	87

== Schedule and results ==
1977–78 regular season
October

Game	Result	Date	Score	Opponent	Record
1	W	October 12, 1977	3–0	@ Houston Aeros (1977–78)	1–0–0
2	W	October 15, 1977	5–2	Birmingham Bulls (1977–78)	2–0–0
3	L	October 16, 1977	2–6	@ Cincinnati Stingers (1977–78)	2–1–0
4	T	October 18, 1977	2–2	@ Indianapolis Racers (1977–78)	2–1–1
5	W	October 19, 1977	6–3	@ Edmonton Oilers (1977–78)	3–1–1
6	W	October 21, 1977	5–2	@ Winnipeg Jets (1977–78)	4–1–1
7	W	October 26, 1977	7–1	Quebec Nordiques (1977–78)	5–1–1
8	W	October 29, 1977	7–2	Houston Aeros (1977–78)	6–1–1

November

Game	Result	Date	Score	Opponent	Record
9	W	November 1, 1977	6–3	@ Quebec Nordiques (1977–78)	7–1–1
10	W	November 4, 1977	4–3	Cincinnati Stingers (1977–78)	8–1–1
11	W	November 6, 1977	5–2	@ Cincinnati Stingers (1977–78)	9–1–1
12	W	November 8, 1977	4–3	@ Birmingham Bulls (1977–78)	10–1–1
13	W	November 10, 1977	5–3	Edmonton Oilers (1977–78)	11–1–1
14	W	November 12, 1977	5–3	Indianapolis Racers (1977–78)	12–1–1
15	W	November 15, 1977	6–4	@ Indianapolis Racers (1977–78)	13–1–1
16	W	November 18, 1977	3–2	Winnipeg Jets (1977–78)	14–1–1
17	W	November 20, 1977	5–4 OT	@ Edmonton Oilers (1977–78)	15–1–1
18	L	November 22, 1977	4–5	@ Quebec Nordiques (1977–78)	15–2–1
19	T	November 23, 1977	3–3	Indianapolis Racers (1977–78)	15–2–2
20	L	November 25, 1977	2–6	Quebec Nordiques (1977–78)	15–3–2
21	L	November 26, 1977	1–3	Edmonton Oilers (1977–78)	15–4–2
22	T	November 30, 1977	3–3	@ Houston Aeros (1977–78)	15–4–3

December

Game	Result	Date	Score	Opponent	Record
23	W	December 2, 1977	4–1	Winnipeg Jets (1977–78)	16–4–3
24	L	December 3, 1977	2–5	Cincinnati Stingers (1977–78)	16–5–3
25	L	December 6, 1977	2–5	@ Indianapolis Racers (1977–78)	16–6–3
26	W	December 7, 1977	6–3	@ Birmingham Bulls (1977–78)	17–6–3
27	W	December 9, 1977	2–1 OT	@ Birmingham Bulls (1977–78)	18–6–3
28	W	December 14, 1977	7–2	Soviet All-Stars (1977–78)	19–6–3
29	W	December 16, 1977	5–3	Czechoslovakia (1977–78)	20–6–3
30	L	December 17, 1977	3–6	Winnipeg Jets (1977–78)	20–7–3
31	L	December 18, 1977	3–7	@ Winnipeg Jets (1977–78)	20–8–3
32	W	December 23, 1977	5–3	Indianapolis Racers (1977–78)	21–8–3
33	W	December 27, 1977	8–1	Birmingham Bulls (1977–78)	22–8–3
34	W	December 30, 1977	6–2	Birmingham Bulls (1977–78)	23–8–3

January

Game	Result	Date	Score	Opponent	Record
35	W	January 1, 1978	4–3 OT	@ Cincinnati Stingers (1977–78)	24–8–3
36	L	January 4, 1978	4–6	Quebec Nordiques (1977–78)	24–9–3
37	L	January 6, 1978	3–4	@ Indianapolis Racers (1977–78)	24–10–3
38	W	January 7, 1978	5–3	Cincinnati Stingers (1977–78)	25–10–3
39	L	January 8, 1978	4–5	Birmingham Bulls (1977–78)	25–11–3
40	W	January 13, 1978	2–0	Edmonton Oilers (1977–78)	26–11–3
41	L	January 14, 1978	4–5 OT	Houston Aeros (1977–78)	26–12–3
42	L	January 18, 1978	0–1	@ Edmonton Oilers (1977–78)	26–13–3
43	T	January 20, 1978	4–4	@ Winnipeg Jets (1977–78)	26–13–4
44	L	January 21, 1978	2–3	@ Quebec Nordiques (1977–78)	26–14–4
45	W	January 22, 1978	6–3	Quebec Nordiques (1977–78)	27–14–4
46	L	January 25, 1978	7–8 OT	@ Cincinnati Stingers (1977–78)	27–15–4
47	W	January 27, 1978	6–2	@ Birmingham Bulls (1977–78)	28–15–4
48	W	January 28, 1978	3–0	@ Houston Aeros (1977–78)	29–15–4
49	L	January 29, 1978	4–6	@ Houston Aeros (1977–78)	29–16–4

February

Game	Result	Date	Score	Opponent	Record
50	W	February 1, 1978	4–3	Edmonton Oilers (1977–78)	30–16–4
51	L	February 3, 1978	3–6	Edmonton Oilers (1977–78)	30–17–4
52	L	February 4, 1978	4–5	@ Houston Aeros (1977–78)	30–18–4
53	W	February 11, 1978	8–7	@ Cincinnati Stingers (1977–78)	31–18–4
54	W	February 14, 1978	5–1	Quebec Nordiques (1977–78)	32–18–4
55	L	February 16, 1978	1–2 OT	Winnipeg Jets (1977–78)	32–19–4
56	W	February 18, 1978	4–1	@ Indianapolis Racers (1977–78)	33–19–4
57	L	February 21, 1978	5–6 OT	@ Quebec Nordiques (1977–78)	33–20–4
58	L	February 22, 1978	2–4	@ Winnipeg Jets (1977–78)	33–21–4
59	L	February 24, 1978	2–7	@ Winnipeg Jets (1977–78)	33–22–4
60	W	February 26, 1978	6–5	@ Edmonton Oilers (1977–78)	34–22–4

March

Game	Result	Date	Score	Opponent	Record
61	L	March 1, 1978	3–4 OT	Quebec Nordiques (1977–78)	34–23–4
62	L	March 3, 1978	2–3 OT	Houston Aeros (1977–78)	34–24–4
63	L	March 4, 1978	2–5	Birmingham Bulls (1977–78)	34–25–4
64	L	March 5, 1978	1–2	@ Quebec Nordiques (1977–78)	34–26–4
65	L	March 9, 1978	4–6	@ Houston Aeros (1977–78)	34–27–4
66	W	March 10, 1978	5–4 OT	@ Birmingham Bulls (1977–78)	35–27–4
67	W	March 14, 1978	6–0	Birmingham Bulls (1977–78)	36–27–4
68	W	March 15, 1978	7–0	Indianapolis Racers (1977–78)	37–27–4
69	W	March 17, 1978	6–2	@ Cincinnati Stingers (1977–78)	38–27–4
70	L	March 18, 1978	3–5	@ Quebec Nordiques (1977–78)	38–28–4
71	W	March 21, 1978	6–3	Indianapolis Racers (1977–78)	39–28–4
72	L	March 22, 1978	3–5	Winnipeg Jets (1977–78)	39–29–4
73	L	March 24, 1978	0–1	Houston Aeros (1977–78)	39–30–4
74	W	March 26, 1978	5–3	Edmonton Oilers (1977–78)	40–30–4
75	W	March 29, 1978	6–1	Cincinnati Stingers (1977–78)	41–30–4

April

Game	Result	Date	Score	Opponent	Record
76	W	April 3, 1978	8–6	Houston Aeros (1977–78)	42–30–4
77	T	April 5, 1978	4–4	@ Edmonton Oilers (1977–78)	42–30–5
78	L	April 6, 1978	4–7	@ Winnipeg Jets (1977–78)	42–31–5
79	W	April 10, 1978	6–1	Cincinnati Stingers (1977–78)	43–31–5
80	W	April 11, 1978	6–3	Indianapolis Racers (1977–78)	44–31–5

Legend: Win (2 points) Loss (0 points) Tie (1 point)

== Playoffs ==
1978 Avco Cup playoffs
Division Quarterfinals vs. Edmonton Oilers – Whalers win 4–1

Game	Date	Visitor	Score	Home	Series
1	April 14	Edmonton Oilers	4–6	New England Whalers	1–0
2	April 16	Edmonton Oilers	1–4	New England Whalers	2–0
3	April 19	New England Whalers	0–2	Edmonton Oilers	2–1
4	April 21	New England	9–1	Edmonton Oilers	3–1
5	April 23	Edmonton Oilers	1–4	New England Whalers	4–1

Division Semifinals vs. Quebec Nordiques – Whalers win 4–1

Game	Date	Visitor	Score	Home	Series
1	April 28	Quebec Nordiques	1–5	New England Whalers	1–0
2	April 30	Quebec Nordiques	3–2	New England Whalers	1–1
3	May 3	New England Whalers	5–4	Quebec Nordiques	2–1
4	May 5	New England Whalers	7–3	Quebec Nordiques	3–1
5	May 7	Quebec Nordiques	3–6	New England Whalers	4–1

Avco Cup Finals vs. Winnipeg Jets – Jets win 4–0

Game	Date	Visitor	Score	Home	Series
1	May 12	Winnipeg Jets	4–1	New England Whalers	0–1
2	May 14	Winnipeg Jets	2–5	New England Whalers	0–2
3	May 19	New England Whalers	2–10	Winnipeg Jets	0–3
4	May 22	New England Whalers	3–5	Winnipeg Jets	0–4

Legend: Win Loss

== Player statistics ==
Regular season
Scoring

Player	Pos	GP	G	A	Pts	PIM	+/-	PPG	SHG	GWG
Gordie Howe	RW	76	34	62	96	85	46	16	0	0
Mark Howe	D	70	30	61	91	32	30	4	0	0
Mike Rogers	C	80	28	43	71	46	22	4	1	0
Mike Antonovich	C	75	32	35	67	32	17	5	0	0
Dave Keon	C	77	24	38	62	2	−4	1	5	0
Gordie Roberts	D	78	15	46	61	118	17	5	0	0
John McKenzie	RW	79	27	29	56	61	15	9	0	0
George Lyle	LW	68	30	24	54	74	12	3	0	0
Rick Ley	D	73	3	41	44	95	36	0	0	0
Larry Pleau	C	54	16	18	34	4	12	2	0	0
Brad Selwood	D	80	6	25	31	88	11	2	0	0
Al Hangsleben	D	79	11	18	29	140	17	0	0	0
Jack Carlson	LW	67	9	20	29	192	9	0	0	0
Greg Carroll	C	48	9	14	23	27	3	0	2	0
Tom Webster	RW	20	15	5	20	5	8	5	0	0
Jim Mayer	RW	51	11	9	20	21	1	1	0	0
Marty Howe	D	75	10	10	20	66	10	1	0	0
Tim Sheehy	RW	25	8	11	19	14	−2	3	0	0
Bill Butters	D	45	1	13	14	69	21	0	0	0
Steve Carlson	C	38	6	7	13	11	7	1	1	0
Danny Bolduc	LW	41	5	5	10	22	6	0	0	0
Ron Plumb	D	27	1	9	10	18	6	0	0	0
Bryan Maxwell	D	17	2	1	3	11	9	0	0	0
Al Smith	G	55	0	3	3	4	0	0	0	0
Andre Peloffy	C	10	2	0	2	2	−2	0	0	0
Jean-Louis Levasseur	G	27	0	0	0	2	0	0	0	0

Goaltending

Player	MIN	GP	W	L	T	GA	GAA	SO
Al Smith	3246	55	30	20	3	174	3.22	2
Jean-Louis Levasseur	1655	27	14	11	2	91	3.30	3
Team:	4901	80	44	31	5	265	3.24	5

Playoffs
Scoring

Player	Pos	GP	G	A	Pts	PIM	PPG	SHG	GWG
Mike Antonovich	C	14	10	7	17	4	0	0	1
Dave Keon	C	14	5	11	16	4	0	0	1
Mark Howe	D	14	8	7	15	18	0	0	0
John McKenzie	RW	14	6	6	12	16	0	0	1
Mike Rogers	C	14	5	6	11	8	0	0	0
Gordie Howe	RW	14	5	5	10	15	0	0	2
Larry Pleau	C	14	5	4	9	8	0	0	1
Steve Carlson	C	13	2	7	9	2	0	0	0
Rick Ley	D	14	1	8	9	4	0	0	0
Danny Bolduc	LW	14	2	4	6	4	0	0	0
Ron Plumb	D	14	1	5	6	16	0	0	1
Al Hangsleben	D	14	1	4	5	37	0	0	0
Gordie Roberts	D	14	0	5	5	29	0	0	0
Tim Sheehy	RW	13	1	3	4	9	0	0	0
George Lyle	LW	12	2	1	3	13	0	0	0
Brad Selwood	D	14	0	3	3	8	0	0	0
Jack Carlson	LW	9	1	1	2	14	0	0	0
Marty Howe	D	14	1	1	2	13	0	0	1
Jean-Louis Levasseur	G	12	0	1	1	2	0	0	0
Andre Peloffy	C	2	0	0	0	0	0	0	0
Al Smith	G	3	0	0	0	0	0	0	0

Goaltending

Player	MIN	GP	W	L	GA	GAA	SO
Jean-Louis Levasseur	719	12	8	4	31	2.59	0
Al Smith	120	3	0	2	14	7.00	0
Team:	839	14	8	6	45	3.22	0

Note: Pos = Position; GP = Games played; G = Goals; A = Assists; Pts = Points; +/- = plus/minus; PIM = Penalty minutes; PPG = Power-play goals; SHG = Short-handed goals; GWG = Game-winning goals
MIN = Minutes played; W = Wins; L = Losses; T = Ties; GA = Goals-against; GAA = Goals-against average; SO = Shutouts;

== Draft picks ==
New England's draft picks at the 1977 WHA Amateur Draft.

Round	#	Player	Nationality	College/Junior/Club team (League)
2	15	Moe Robinson (D)	Canada	Kingston Canadians (OHA)
2	19	Randy Pierce (RW)	Canada	Sudbury Wolves (OHA)
3	23	John Baby (D)	Canada	Sudbury Wolves (OHA)
5	43	Brian Hill (RW)	Austria	Medicine Hat Tigers (WCHL)
6	52	Jim Korn (D)	United States	Providence College (ECAC)

== See also ==
- 1977–78 WHA season
