= 1977–78 Quebec Nordiques season =

World Hockey Association team season

1977–78 Quebec Nordiques
- Division: 4th
- 1977–78 record: 40–37–3
- Home record: 29–10–2
- Road record: 11–27–1
- Goals for: 349
- Goals against: 347

Team information
- General manager: Maurice Filion
- Coach: Marc Boileau (27–30–2); Maurice Filion (13–7–1)
- Captain: Marc Tardif
- Alternate captains: Serge Bernier; Jim Dorey; Bob Fitchner
- Arena: Colisée de Québec

Team leaders
- Goals: Marc Tardif (65)
- Assists: Marc Tardif (89)
- Points: Marc Tardif (154)
- Penalty minutes: Paul Baxter (240)
- Plus/minus: Jean Bernier (+22)
- Wins: Richard Brodeur (18)
- Goals against average: Richard Brodeur (3.70)

The 1977–78 Quebec Nordiques season was the Nordiques sixth season in the WHA, as they were coming off of a 47–31–3 record in the 1976–77 season, finishing in first place in the Eastern Division. Quebec defeated the New England Whalers, Indianapolis Racers and Winnipeg Jets to win their first ever Avco Cup.

== Off-season ==
During the off-season, the league would lose another three teams, as the Calgary Cowboys, Phoenix Roadrunners, and San Diego Mariners would all fold, bringing the league down to eight teams. The WHA abandoned the divisional format and grouped the remaining teams together. There had been a tentative agreement that would see the Nordiques, Cincinnati Stingers, Edmonton Oilers, Houston Aeros, New England Whalers, and Winnipeg Jets join the National Hockey League, however, it could not be finalized. In a unique move, the Soviet All-Stars and Czechoslovak All-Stars would play games that would count in the final standings, as they played each WHA team once.

== Regular season ==
After losing their opening two games, the Nordiques would get hot, and earn a 16–10–1 record through their opening 27 games to sit in second place in the league. Quebec would then fall into a slump, in which they would post a record of 11–20–1 record in their next 32 games to fall three games under .500, and into fifth place. The slump would cost head coach Marc Boileau his job, as he was relieved of his duties and replaced with Maurice Filion. Under Filion, the Nordiques improved, earning a record of 13–7–1 to finish the season with a 40–37–3 record, earning 83 points, and fourth place in the league.

Offensively, Quebec was led by Marc Tardif, who won the Bill Hunter Trophy awarded to the player who leads the league in scoring. Tardif led the league in goals with 65, tied for the league lead with 89 assists, for 154 points. Real Cloutier had another great season, scoring 56 goals and 129 points in 73 games. Serge Bernier finished third in team scoring with 78 points, despite missing 24 games, while Paulin Bordeleau scored 42 goals and 65 points. On defence, Garry Lariviere had a breakout season, earning 56 points, while Jean Bernier had 10 goals and 42 points. J.C. Tremblay continued to put up points, earning 42 in 56 games and Paul Baxter had 35 points, along with a team high 240 penalty minutes.

In goal, Richard Brodeur missed some time due to injuries, however, he still led the team with 18 wins and a 3.70 GAA in 36 games. Backup Jim Corsi had 10 wins and a 4.52 GAA, while Ken Broderick earned 9 wins with a 4.37 GAA.

== Season standings ==
Note: W = Wins, L = Losses, T = Ties, GF= Goals For, GA = Goals Against, Pts = Points

WHA Team	W	L	T	Pts	GF	GA	PIM
Winnipeg Jets	50	28	2	102	381	270	988
New England Whalers	44	31	5	93	335	269	1255
Houston Aeros	42	34	4	88	296	302	1543
Quebec Nordiques	40	37	3	83	349	347	1185
Edmonton Oilers	38	39	3	79	309	307	1296
Birmingham Bulls	36	41	3	75	287	314	2177
Cincinnati Stingers	35	42	3	73	298	332	1701
Indianapolis Racers	24	51	5	53	267	353	1189
Soviet All-Stars	3	4	1	7	27	36	120
Czechoslovakia All-Stars	1	6	1	3	21	40	87

== Schedule and results ==
1977–78 regular season
October

Game	Date	Visitor	Score	Home	Record	Points
1	October 13	Quebec Nordiques	2–5	Winnipeg Jets	0–1–0	0
2	October 14	Quebec Nordiques	2–4	Edmonton Oilers	0–2–0	0
3	October 15	Edmonton Oilers	2–6	Quebec Nordiques	1–2–0	2
4	October 18	Cincinnati Stingers	1–5	Quebec Nordiques	2–2–0	4
5	October 21	Quebec Nordiques	4–4	Indianapolis Racers	2–2–1	5
6	October 22	Birmingham Bulls	5–8	Quebec Nordiques	3–2–1	7
7	October 26	Quebec Nordiques	1–7	New England Whalers	3–3–1	7
8	October 30	Houston Aeros	4–5	Quebec Nordiques	4–3–1	9

November

Game	Result	Date	Score	Opponent	Record	Points
9	November 1	New England Whalers	6–3	Quebec Nordiques	4–4–1	9
10	November 4	Quebec Nordiques	7–6	Houston Aeros	5–4–1	11
11	November 5	Quebec Nordiques	4–5	Birmingham Bulls	5–5–1	11
12	November 8	Edmonton Oilers	3–7	Quebec Nordiques	6–5–1	13
13	November 11	Quebec Nordiques	3–2	Winnipeg Jets	7–5–1	15
14	November 12	Cincinnati Stingers	6–5	Quebec Nordiques	7–6–1	15
15	November 15	Winnipeg Jets	6–7	Quebec Nordiques	8–6–1	17
16	November 18	Quebec Nordiques	5–6	Houston Aeros	8–7–1	17
17	November 20	Indianapolis Racers	2–5	Quebec Nordiques	9–7–1	19
18	November 22	New England Whalers	4–5	Quebec Nordiques	10–7–1	21
19	November 23	Quebec Nordiques	3–4	Cincinnati Stingers	10–8–1	21
20	November 25	Quebec Nordiques	6–2	New England Whalers	11–8–1	23
21	November 26	Birmingham Bulls	2–4	Quebec Nordiques	12–8–1	25
22	November 29	Cincinnati Stingers	3–2	Quebec Nordiques	12–9–1	25

December

Game	Result	Date	Score	Opponent	Record	Points
23	December 1	Quebec Nordiques	4–5	Indianapolis Racers	12–10–1	25
24	December 3	Winnipeg Jets	5–6	Quebec Nordiques	13–10–1	27
25	December 6	Houston Aeros	3–4	Quebec Nordiques	14–10–1	29
26	December 10	Indianapolis Racers	3–5	Quebec Nordiques	15–10–1	31
27	December 11	Czechoslovak All-Stars	4–8	Quebec Nordiques	16–10–1	33
28	December 26	Quebec Nordiques	4–9	Winnipeg Jets	16–11–1	33
29	December 27	Quebec Nordiques	3–9	Edmonton Oilers	16–12–1	33

January

Game	Result	Date	Score	Opponent	Record	Points
30	January 1	Quebec Nordiques	5–2	Birmingham Bulls	17–12–1	35
31	January 3	Soviet All-Stars	3–3	Quebec Nordiques	17–12–2	36
32	January 4	Quebec Nordiques	6–3	New England Whalers	18–12–2	38
33	January 6	Quebec Nordiques	3–5	Cincinnati Stingers	18–13–2	38
34	January 10	Birmingham Bulls	4–6	Quebec Nordiques	19–13–2	40
35	January 11	Quebec Nordiques	1–2	Indianapolis Racers	19–14–2	40
36	January 14	Edmonton Oilers	4–7	Quebec Nordiques	20–14–2	42
37	January 15	Cincinnati Stingers	6–3	Quebec Nordiques	20–15–2	42
38	January 18	Quebec Nordiques	1–5	Winnipeg Jets	20–16–2	42
39	January 20	Quebec Nordiques	8–2	Cincinnati Stingers	21–16–2	44
40	January 21	New England Whalers	2–3	Quebec Nordiques	22–16–2	46
41	January 22	Quebec Nordiques	3–6	New England Whalers	22–17–2	46
42	January 24	Houston Aeros	6–5	Quebec Nordiques	22–18–2	46
43	January 27	Quebec Nordiques	6–9	Edmonton Oilers	22–19–2	46
44	January 29	Quebec Nordiques	4–3	Edmonton Oilers	23–19–2	48
45	January 31	Winnipeg Jets	7–2	Quebec Nordiques	23–20–2	48

February

Game	Result	Date	Score	Opponent	Record	Points
46	February 2	Quebec Nordiques	4–2	Birmingham Bulls	24–20–2	50
47	February 3	Quebec Nordiques	4–5	Indianapolis Racers	24–21–2	50
48	February 4	Edmonton Oilers	4–3	Quebec Nordiques	24–22–2	50
49	February 7	Birmingham Bulls	3–8	Quebec Nordiques	25–22–2	52
50	February 9	Quebec Nordiques	1–2	Houston Aeros	25–23–2	52
51	February 11	Quebec Nordiques	4–8	Houston Aeros	25–24–2	52
52	February 12	Quebec Nordiques	2–8	Cincinnati Stingers	25–25–2	52
53	February 14	Quebec Nordiques	1–5	New England Whalers	25–26–2	52
54	February 15	Quebec Nordiques	6–9	Indianapolis Racers	25–27–2	52
55	February 17	Quebec Nordiques	4–6	Edmonton Oilers	25–28–2	52
56	February 19	Quebec Nordiques	2–5	Winnipeg Jets	25–29–2	52
57	February 21	New England Whalers	5–6	Quebec Nordiques	26–29–2	54
58	February 23	Quebec Nordiques	3–7	Birmingham Bulls	26–30–2	54
59	February 25	Indianapolis Racers	5–7	Quebec Nordiques	27–30–2	56
60	February 28	Houston Aeros	2–5	Quebec Nordiques	28–30–2	58

March

Game	Result	Date	Score	Opponent	Record	Points
61	March 1	Quebec Nordiques	4–3	New England Whalers	29–30–2	60
62	March 4	Houston Aeros	3–3	Quebec Nordiques	29–30–3	61
63	March 5	New England Whalers	1–2	Quebec Nordiques	30–30–3	63
64	March 7	Cincinnati Stingers	5–4	Quebec Nordiques	30–31–3	63
65	March 8	Quebec Nordiques	5–4	Indianapolis Racers	31–31–3	65
66	March 9	Quebec Nordiques	2–9	Birmingham Bulls	31–32–3	65
67	March 11	Winnipeg Jets	7–4	Quebec Nordiques	31–33–3	65
68	March 14	Edmonton Oilers	3–6	Quebec Nordiques	32–33–3	67
69	March 16	Indianapolis Racers	2–5	Quebec Nordiques	33–33–3	69
70	March 18	New England Whalers	3–5	Quebec Nordiques	34–33–3	71
71	March 19	Quebec Nordiques	3–5	Winnipeg Jets	34–34–3	71
72	March 21	Birmingham Bulls	5–4	Quebec Nordiques	34–35–3	71
73	March 24	Quebec Nordiques	4–3	Birmingham Bulls	35–35–3	73
74	March 25	Quebec Nordiques	3–4	Houston Aeros	35–36–3	73
75	March 28	Cincinnati Stingers	4–6	Quebec Nordiques	36–36–3	75

April

Game	Result	Date	Score	Opponent	Record	Points
76	April 1	Winnipeg Jets	2–5	Quebec Nordiques	37–36–3	77
77	April 2	Houston Aeros	1–7	Quebec Nordiques	38–36–3	79
78	April 4	Edmonton Oilers	1–9	Quebec Nordiques	39–36–3	81
79	April 8	Indianapolis Racers	3–7	Quebec Nordiques	40–36–3	83
80	April 9	Quebec Nordiques	2–6	Cincinnati Stingers	40–37–3	83

Legend: Win (2 points) Loss (0 points) Tie (1 point)

== Playoffs ==
In the opening round of the playoffs, Quebec would face the Houston Aeros in a best of seven series. The Aeros finished the season with a 42–34–4 record, earning 86 points, and a third-place finish. The series opened in Houston, and the Aeros won the series opener in overtime by a 4–3 score, however, the defending champion Nordiques evened the series with a 5–4 overtime victory in the second game. The series moved to Quebec for the next two games, and the Nordiques took control of the series, winning the third game 5–1, followed by a 3–0 shutout victory in the fourth game to take a 3–1 series lead. The fifth game was played in Houston, and the Aeros staved off elimination with a 5–2, bringing the series back to Quebec for the sixth game. The Nordiques would dominate in the sixth game, crushing the Aeros 11–2, and advance to the WHA semi-finals.

In the WHA semi-finals, the Nordiques would face off against the New England Whalers. New England finished in second during the regular season, with a record of 44–31–5, earning 93 points. The Whalers defeated the Edmonton Oilers in five games in the opening round of the playoffs. The series opened with two games in New England, and the Whalers took an early series lead with a 5–1 victory in the series opener. Quebec fought back and tied the series up with a 3–2 win in the second game. The series moved to Quebec for the next two games, however, it was the Whalers who took control of the series, defeating the Nordiques 5–4 in the third game, followed by a 7–3 win in the fourth game to take a 3–1 series lead. In the fifth game back in New England, the Whalers took their opportunity and finished off the Nordiques, defeating Quebec 6–3 to win the series.

1978 Avco Cup playoffs
Quarterfinals vs. (3) Houston Aeros – Nordiques win 4–2

Game	Date	Visitor	Score	Home	Series
1	April 16	Quebec Nordiques	3–4	Houston Aeros	0–1
2	April 18	Quebec Nordiques	5–4	Houston Aeros	1–1
3	April 20	Houston Aeros	1–5	Quebec Nordiques	2–1
4	April 21	Houston Aeros	0–3	Quebec Nordiques	3–1
5	April 23	Quebec Nordiques	2–5	Houston Aeros	3–2
6	April 25	Houston Aeros	2–11	Quebec Nordiques	4–2

Semifinals vs. (2) New England Whalers – Whalers win 4–1

Game	Date	Visitor	Score	Home	Series
1	April 28	Quebec Nordiques	1–5	New England Whalers	0–1
2	April 30	Quebec Nordiques	3–2	New England Whalers	1–1
3	May 3	New England Whalers	5–4	Quebec Nordiques	1–2
4	May 5	New England Whalers	7–3	Quebec Nordiques	1–3
5	May 7	Quebec Nordiques	3–6	New England Whalers	1–4

Legend: Win Loss

== Player statistics ==
=== Scoring leaders ===
Regular season
Player	GP	G	A	Pts	PIM
Marc Tardif	78	65	89	154	50
Real Cloutier	73	56	73	129	19
Serge Bernier	58	26	52	78	48
Paulin Bordeleau	77	42	23	65	29
Matti Hagman	53	25	31	56	16

Playoffs
Player	GP	G	A	Pts	PIM
Real Cloutier	10	9	7	16	15
Marc Tardif	11	6	9	15	11
Serge Bernier	11	4	10	14	17
Paul Baxter	11	4	7	11	42
Paulin Bordeleau	11	4	6	10	2

=== Goaltending ===
Player	GP	Min	W	L	T	GA	SO	GAA	Save %
Richard Brodeur	36	1962	18	15	2	121	0	3.70	.892
Don McLeod	7	403	2	4	0	28	0	4.17	.870
Ken Broderick	24	1140	9	8	1	83	0	4.37	.859
Jim Corsi	23	1089	10	7	0	82	0	4.52	.873
Markus Mattsson	6	266	1	3	0	30	0	6.77	.819

Playoffs
Player	GP	Min	W	L	GA	SO	GAA
Ken Broderick	2	48	0	1	2	0	2.50
Richard Brodeur	11	622	5	5	38	1	3.67

Note:

Pos = Position;GP = Games played; G = Goals; A = Assists; Pts = Points; PIM = Penalty minutes; +/- = Plus/minus; PPG = Power-play goals; SHG = Short-handed goals; GWG = Game-winning goals
Pos = Position;GP = Games played; Min, TOI = Minutes played; W = Wins; L = Losses; T,T/OT = Ties; OTL = Overtime losses; GA = Goals-against; GAA = Goals-against average; SO = Shutouts; SA = Shots against; SV = Shots saved;SV% = Save percentage;

== Draft picks ==
Quebec's draft picks at the 1977 WHA Amateur Draft.

Round	#	Player	Nationality	College/Junior/Club team (League)
1	9	Lucien DeBlois (F)	Canada	Sorel Black Hawks (QMJHL)
2	14	John Anderson (LW)	Canada	Toronto Marlboros (OHA)
2	20	Benoit Gosselin (LW)	Canada	Trois-Rivieres Draveurs (QMJHL)
3	29	Tom Roulston (RW)	Canada	Winnipeg Monarchs (WCHL)
4	38	Robert Picard (D)	Canada	Montreal Juniors (QMJHL)
5	47	Alain Cote (LW)	Canada	Chicoutimi Sagueneens (QMJHL)
6	56	Yves Guillemette (G)	Canada	Shawinigan Dynamos (QMJHL)
7	65	Eddy Godin (RW)	Canada	Quebec Remparts (QMJHL)
8	73	Pierre Lagace (C)	Canada	Quebec Remparts (QMJHL)
9	81	Dan Chicoine (RW)	Canada	Sherbrooke Castors (QMJHL)
10	89	Roland Cloutier (C)	Canada	Trois-Rivieres Draveurs (QMJHL)

== See also ==
- 1977–78 WHA season
