= 1977–78 Cincinnati Stingers season =

World Hockey Association team season

1977–78 Cincinnati Stingers
- League: 7th WHA
- 1977–78 record: 35–42–3
- Home record: 21–19–1
- Road record: 14–23–2
- Goals for: 298
- Goals against: 332

Team information
- Coach: Jacques Demers (33–39–3); Jerry Rafter (2–3–0)
- Captain: Rick Dudley
- Alternate captains: Robbie Ftorek; Dennis Sobchuk
- Arena: Riverfront Coliseum

Team leaders
- Goals: Robbie Ftorek (59)
- Assists: Robbie Ftorek (50)
- Points: Robbie Ftorek (109)
- Penalty minutes: Paul Stewart (241)
- Wins: Michel Dion (21)
- Goals against average: Michel Dion (3.57)

The 1977–78 Cincinnati Stingers season was the Stingers' third season in the World Hockey Association (WHA). The Stingers placed seventh and missed the playoffs.

== Regular season ==
=== Final standings ===
Note: W = Wins, L = Losses, T = Ties, GF= Goals For, GA = Goals Against, Pts = Points

WHA Team	W	L	T	Pts	GF	GA	PIM
Winnipeg Jets	50	28	2	102	381	270	988
New England Whalers	44	31	5	93	335	269	1255
Houston Aeros	42	34	4	88	296	302	1543
Quebec Nordiques	40	37	3	83	349	347	1185
Edmonton Oilers	38	39	3	79	309	307	1296
Birmingham Bulls	36	41	3	75	287	314	2177
Cincinnati Stingers	35	42	3	73	298	332	1701
Indianapolis Racers	24	51	5	53	267	353	1189
Soviet All-Stars	3	4	1	7	27	36	120
Czechoslovakia All-Stars	1	6	1	3	21	40	87

== Schedule and results ==
1977–78 regular season
October

Game	Result	Date	Score	Opponent	Record
1	L	October 12, 1977	4–5	Indianapolis Racers (1977–78)	0–1–0
2	L	October 15, 1977	4–5	Winnipeg Jets (1977–78)	0-2-0
3	W	October 16, 1977	6-3	New England Whalers (1977–78)	1-2-0
4	L	October 18, 1978	1-5	@ Quebec Nordiques (1977–78)	1-3-0
5	L	October 21, 1977	5-6	@ Houston Aeros (1977–78)	1-4–0
6	L	October 28, 1977	2-3	@ Winnipeg Jets (1977–78)	1-5-0

November

Game	Result	Date	Score	Opponent	Record
7	L	November 4, 1977	2-4	@ New England Whalers (1977–78)	1-6-0
8	L	November 5, 1977	1–6	Winnipeg Jets (1977–78)	1-7-0
9	L	November 6, 1977	2-5	New England Whalers (1977–78)	1-8-0
10	W	November 10, 1978	2-1	Birmingham Bulls (1977–78)	2-8-0
11	L	November 11, 1977	2–3	Edmonton Oilers (1977–78)	2–9–0
12	W	November 12, 1977	6–5 OT	@ Quebec Nordiques (1977–78)	3–9–0
13	W	November 13, 1977	3–2	@ Winnipeg Jets (1977–78)	4–9–0
14	L	November 16, 1977	4–6	@ Edmonton Oilers (1977–78)	4–10–0
15	L	November 18, 1977	3–4 OT	@ Edmonton Oilers (1977–78)	4–11–0
16	W	November 23, 1977	4–3	Quebec Nordiques (1977–78)	5–11–0
17	L	November 24, 1977	2–12	@ Birmingham Bulls (1977–78)	5–12–0
18	L	November 25, 1977	1–3	@ Houston Aeros (1977–78)	5–13–0
19	W	November 26, 1977	7–5	@ Indianapolis Racers (1977–78)	6–13–0
20	W	November 29, 1977	3–2	@ Quebec Nordiques (1977–78)	7–13–0
21	W	November 30, 1977	3–0	Indianapolis Racers (1977–78)	8–13–0

December

Game	Result	Date	Score	Opponent	Record
22	W	December 3, 1977	5–2	@ New England Whalers (1977–78)	9–13–0
23	L	December 4, 1977	2–3	Houston Aeros (1977–78)	9–14–0
24	L	December 7, 1977	4–5 OT	@ Edmonton Oilers (1977–78)	9–15–0
25	W	December 9, 1977	4–3 OT	@ Winnipeg Jets (1977–78)	10–15–0
26	W	December 14, 1977	3–1	Indianapolis Racers (1977–78)	11–15–0
27	L	December 15, 1977	3–5	@ Birmingham Bulls (1977–78)	11–16–0
28	L	December 17, 1977	4–5	Soviet All-Stars (1977–78)	11–17–0
29	T	December 20, 1977	5–5	Czechoslovakia (1977–78)	11–17–1
30	W	December 22, 1977	4–1	@ Indianapolis Racers (1977–78)	12–17–1
31	L	December 23, 1977	4–6	Winnipeg Jets (1977–78)	12–18–1
32	W	December 28, 1977	5–4 OT	Indianapolis Racers (1977–78)	13–18–1
33	L	December 29, 1977	1–7	Birmingham Bulls (1977–78)	13–19–1
34	T	December 30, 1977	5–5	@ Houston Aeros (1977–78)	13–19–2

January

Game	Result	Date	Score	Opponent	Record
35	L	January 1, 1978	3–4 OT	New England Whalers (1977–78)	13–20–2
36	W	January 4, 1978	5–3	Houston Aeros (1977–78)	14–20–2
37	W	January 6, 1978	5–3	Quebec Nordiques (1977–78)	15–20–2
38	L	January 7, 1978	3–5	@ New England Whalers (1977–78)	15–21–2
39	L	January 11, 1978	0–2	Edmonton Oilers (1977–78)	15–22–2
40	L	January 14, 1978	3–4	Birmingham Bulls (1977–78)	15–23–2
41	W	January 15, 1978	6–3	@ Quebec Nordiques (1977–78)	16–23–2
42	L	January 18, 1978	0–3	@ Birmingham Bulls (1977–78)	16–24–2
43	L	January 20, 1978	2–8	Quebec Nordiques (1977–78)	16–25–2
44	L	January 21, 1978	2–5	@ Houston Aeros (1977–78)	16–26–2
45	W	January 22, 1978	5–2	Edmonton Oilers (1977–78)	17–26–2
46	W	January 25, 1978	8–7 OT	New England Whalers (1977–78)	18–26–2
47	L	January 29, 1978	4–8	Winnipeg Jets (1977–78)	18–27–2
48	W	January 30, 1978	4–3	@ Indianapolis Racers (1977–78)	19–27–2

February

Game	Result	Date	Score	Opponent	Record
49	W	February 1, 1978	8–0	Indianapolis Racers (1977–78)	20–27–2
50	W	February 3, 1978	1–0	Houston Aeros (1977–78)	21–27–2
51	L	February 4, 1978	5–7	Winnipeg Jets (1977–78)	21–28–2
52	T	February 8, 1978	6–6	@ Edmonton Oilers (1977–78)	21–28–3
53	L	February 10, 1978	2–10	@ Winnipeg Jets (1977–78)	21–29–3
54	L	February 11, 1978	7–8	New England Whalers (1977–78)	21–30–3
55	W	February 12, 1978	8–2	Quebec Nordiques (1977–78)	22–30–3
56	L	February 15, 1978	2–5	Houston Aeros (1977–78)	22–31–3
57	W	February 17, 1978	4–3 OT	@ Houston Aeros (1977–78)	23–31–3
58	L	February 18, 1978	0–4	Winnipeg Jets (1977–78)	23–32–3
59	W	February 19, 1978	4–3 OT	Birmingham Bulls (1977–78)	24–32–3
60	L	February 25, 1978	3–7	@ Birmingham Bulls (1977–78)	24–33–3

March

Game	Result	Date	Score	Opponent	Record
61	W	March 1, 1978	6–4	@ Edmonton Oilers (1977–78)	25–33–3
62	W	March 3, 1978	5–1	@ Winnipeg Jets (1977–78)	26–33–3
63	L	March 5, 1978	2–4	@ Indianapolis Racers (1977–78)	26–34–3
64	W	March 7, 1978	5–4	@ Quebec Nordiques (1977–78)	27–34–3
65	W	March 9, 1978	6–5	Edmonton Oilers (1977–78)	28–34–3
66	W	March 11, 1978	2–0	Edmonton Oilers (1977–78)	29–34–3
67	W	March 15, 1978	7–2	Birmingham Bulls (1977–78)	30–34–3
68	L	March 17, 1978	2–6	New England Whalers (1977–78)	30–35–3
69	W	March 18, 1978	4–2	Indianapolis Racers (1977–78)	31–35–3
70	L	March 19, 1978	2–4	@ Edmonton Oilers (1977–78)	31–36–3
71	W	March 22, 1978	9–2	Houston Aeros (1977–78)	32–36–3
72	L	March 28, 1978	4–6	@ Quebec Nordiques (1977–78)	32–37–3
73	L	March 29, 1978	1–6	@ New England Whalers (1977–78)	32–38–3

April

Game	Result	Date	Score	Opponent	Record
74	L	April 1, 1978	1–5	@ Birmingham Bulls (1977–78)	32–39–3
75	L	April 2, 1978	3–6	@ Indianapolis Racers (1977–78)	32–40–3
76	W	April 5, 1978	5–4	Birmingham Bulls (1977–78)	33–40–3
77	W	April 7, 1978	6–4	@ Indianapolis Racers (1977–78)	34–40–3
78	L	April 8, 1978	4–5	@ Houston Aeros (1977–78)	34–41–3
79	W	April 9, 1978	6–2	Quebec Nordiques (1977–78)	35–41–3
80	L	April 10, 1978	1–6	@ New England Whalers (1977–78)	35–42–3

Legend: Win (2 points) Loss (0 points) Tie (1 point)

== Draft picks ==
Cincinnati's draft picks at the 1977 WHA Amateur Draft.

Round	#	Player	Nationality	College/Junior/Club team (League)
1	7	Jere Gillis (F)	United States	Sherbrooke Castors (QMJHL)
2	18	Dave Morrow (D)	Canada	Calgary Centennials (WCHL)
3	25	Floyd Lahache (D)	Canada	Sherbrooke Castors (QMJHL)
3	26	Bob Gladney (D)	Canada	Oshawa Generals (OHA)
3	27	Colin Ahern (C)	United States	Providence College (ECAC)
4	36	Jeff Allan (D)	Canada	Hull Olympiques (QMJHL)
5	45	Jim Trainor (D)	United States	Harvard University (ECAC)
6	54	Bill Himmelright (D)	United States	University of North Dakota (WCHA)
7	63	Tom Byers (W)	United States	Providence College (ECAC)
8	71	Bob Boileau (C)	Canada	Boston University (ECAC)
9	79	Jim Craig (G)	United States	Boston University (ECAC)
10	87	David Kelley (D)	United States	Princeton University (ECAC)

== See also ==
- 1977–78 WHA season
