= 1977–78 Indianapolis Racers season =

World Hockey Association team season

1977–78 Indianapolis Racers
- League: 8th WHA
- 1977–78 record: 24–51–5
- Home record: 17–21–3
- Road record: 7–30–2
- Goals for: 267
- Goals against: 353

Team information
- Coach: Ron Ingram, Bill Goldsworthy
- Captain: Ken Block
- Alternate captains: Barry Wilkins; Rusty Patenaude; Rosaire Paiement
- Arena: Market Square Arena

Team leaders
- Goals: Claude St. Sauveur (36)
- Assists: Claude St. Sauveur (42)
- Points: Claude St. Sauveur (78)
- Penalty minutes: Kevin Devine (141)
- Wins: Gary Inness (14)
- Goals against average: Gary Inness; Jim Park (4.21)

The 1977–78 Indianapolis Racers season was the Racers' fourth season of operation in the World Hockey Association.

Ron Ingram (16–31–4) was Indianapolis' head coach until February 7 when he was replaced by player-coach Bill Goldsworthy.

== Regular season ==
=== Final standings ===
Note: W = Wins, L = Losses, T = Ties, GF= Goals For, GA = Goals Against, Pts = Points

WHA Team	W	L	T	Pts	GF	GA	PIM
Winnipeg Jets	50	28	2	102	381	270	988
New England Whalers	44	31	5	93	335	269	1255
Houston Aeros	42	34	4	88	296	302	1543
Quebec Nordiques	40	37	3	83	349	347	1185
Edmonton Oilers	38	39	3	79	309	307	1296
Birmingham Bulls	36	41	3	75	287	314	2177
Cincinnati Stingers	35	42	3	73	298	332	1701
Indianapolis Racers	24	51	5	53	267	353	1189
Soviet All-Stars	3	4	1	7	27	36	120
Czechoslovakia All-Stars	1	6	1	3	21	40	87

== Schedule and results ==
1977–78 regular season
October

Game	Result	Date	Score	Opponent	Record
1	W	October 12, 1977	5–4	@ Cincinnati Stingers (1977–78)	1–0–0
2	L	October 15, 1977	1–5	@ Houston Aeros (1977–78)	1–1–0
3	L	October 16, 1977	1–9	@ Winnipeg Jets (1977–78)	1–2–0
4	T	October 18, 1977	2–2	New England Whalers (1977–78)	1–2–1
5	T	October 21, 1977	4–4	Quebec Nordiques (1977–78)	1–2–2
6	W	October 25, 1977	5–4	@ Birmingham Bulls (1977–78)	2–2–2
7	W	October 26, 1977	5–3	Winnipeg Jets (1977–78)	3–2–2
8	W	October 29, 1977	6–2	Birmingham Bulls (1977–78)	4–2–2

November

Game	Result	Date	Score	Opponent	Record
9	W	November 1, 1977	6–3	Houston Aeros (1977–78)	5–2–2
10	L	November 4, 1977	1–3	@ Edmonton Oilers (1977–78)	5–3–2
11	L	November 11, 1977	3–5	@ Houston Aeros (1977–78)	5–4–2
12	L	November 12, 1977	3–5	@ New England Whalers (1977–78)	5–5–2
13	L	November 15, 1977	4–6	New England Whalers (1977–78)	5–6–2
14	L	November 18, 1977	1–2	Birmingham Bulls (1977–78)	5–7–2
15	L	November 19, 1977	4–6	Winnipeg Jets (1977–78)	5–8–2
16	L	November 20, 1977	2–5	@ Quebec Nordiques (1977–78)	5–9–2
17	T	November 23, 1977	3–3	@ New England Whalers (1977–78)	5–9–3
18	W	November 24, 1977	5–4 OT	Edmonton Oilers (1977–78)	6–9–3
19	L	November 26, 1977	5–7	Cincinnati Stingers (1977–78)	6–10–3
20	L	November 30, 1977	0–3	@ Cincinnati Stingers (1977–78)	6–11–3

December

Game	Result	Date	Score	Opponent	Record
21	W	December 1, 1977	5–4	Quebec Nordiques (1977–78)	7–11–3
22	W	December 2, 1977	4–2	@ Houston Aeros (1977–78)	8–11–3
23	L	December 4, 1977	0–3	@ Birmingham Bulls (1977–78)	8–12–3
24	W	December 6, 1977	5–2	New England Whalers (1977–78)	9–12–3
25	L	December 9, 1977	3–5	Czechoslovakia (1977–78)	9–13–3
26	L	December 10, 1977	3–5	@ Quebec Nordiques (1977–78)	9–14–3
27	L	December 11, 1977	1–7	@ Winnipeg Jets (1977–78)	9–15–3
28	L	December 14, 1977	1–3	@ Cincinnati Stingers (1977–78)	9–16–3
29	T	December 15, 1977	3–3	Houston Aeros (1977–78)	9–16–4
30	L	December 18, 1977	3–4	Soviet All-Stars (1977–78)	9–17–4
31	L	December 22, 1977	1–4	Cincinnati Stingers (1977–78)	9–18–4
32	L	December 23, 1977	3–5	@ New England Whalers (1977–78)	9–19–4
33	L	December 28, 1977	4–5 OT	@ Cincinnati Stingers (1977–78)	9–20–4
34	L	December 29, 1977	1–7	Houston Aeros (1977–78)	9–21–4
35	L	December 30, 1977	5–8	@ Edmonton Oilers (1977–78)	9–22–4

January

Game	Result	Date	Score	Opponent	Record
36	W	January 4, 1978	4–1	Birmingham Bulls (1977–78)	10–22–4
37	W	January 6, 1978	4–3	New England Whalers (1977–78)	11–22–4
38	W	January 7, 1978	2–1 OT	@ Houston Aeros (1977–78)	12–22–4
39	L	January 8, 1978	2–4	@ Winnipeg Jets (1977–78)	12–23–4
40	W	January 11, 1978	2–1	Quebec Nordiques (1977–78)	13–23–4
41	L	January 14, 1978	3–6	Winnipeg Jets (1977–78)	13–24–4
42	L	January 20, 1978	3–4	Houston Aeros (1977–78)	13–25–4
43	L	January 21, 1978	2–3	Edmonton Oilers (1977–78)	13–26–4
44	W	January 22, 1978	5–4	@ Winnipeg Jets (1977–78)	14–26–4
45	L	January 25, 1978	2–6	@ Edmonton Oilers (1977–78)	14–27–4
46	L	January 30, 1978	3–4	Cincinnati Stingers (1977–78)	14–28–4
47	L	January 31, 1978	4–6	Edmonton Oilers (1977–78)	14–29–4

February

Game	Result	Date	Score	Opponent	Record
48	L	February 1, 1978	0–8	@ Cincinnati Stingers (1977–78)	14–30–4
49	W	February 3, 1978	5–4 OT	Quebec Nordiques (1977–78)	15–30–4
50	L	February 4, 1978	2–5	@ Birmingham Bulls (1977–78)	15–31–4
51	W	February 5, 1978	6–1	Birmingham Bulls (1977–78)	16–31–4
52	L	February 11, 1978	3–5	Winnipeg Jets (1977–78)	16–32–4
53	W	February 15, 1978	9–6	Quebec Nordiques (1977–78)	17–32–4
54	L	February 17, 1978	4–5 OT	@ Birmingham Bulls (1977–78)	17–33–4
55	L	February 18, 1978	1–4	New England Whalers (1977–78)	17–34–4
56	L	February 19, 1978	3–4 OT	@ Edmonton Oilers (1977–78)	17–35–4
57	L	February 25, 1978	5–7	@ Quebec Nordiques (1977–78)	17–36–4
58	W	February 26, 1978	6–3	@ Birmingham Bulls (1977–78)	18–36–4

March

Game	Result	Date	Score	Opponent	Record
59	W	March 1, 1978	5–1	Houston Aeros (1977–78)	19–36–4
60	W	March 3, 1978	8–6	@ Edmonton Oilers (1977–78)	20–36–4
61	W	March 4, 1978	8–6	Winnipeg Jets (1977–78)	21–36–4
62	W	March 5, 1978	4–2	Cincinnati Stingers (1977–78)	22–36–4
63	L	March 8, 1978	4–5 OT	Quebec Nordiques (1977–78)	22–37–4
64	L	March 9, 1978	5–6	@ Winnipeg Jets (1977–78)	22–38–4
65	W	March 11, 1978	4–2	Houston Aeros (1977–78)	23–38–4
66	L	March 12, 1978	3–6	@ Houston Aeros (1977–78)	23–39–4
67	L	March 15, 1978	0–7	@ New England Whalers (1977–78)	23–40–4
68	L	March 16, 1978	2–5	@ Quebec Nordiques (1977–78)	23–41–4
69	L	March 18, 1978	2–4	@ Cincinnati Stingers (1977–78)	23–42–4
70	T	March 19, 1978	3–3	@ Birmingham Bulls (1977–78)	23–42–5
71	L	March 21, 1978	3–6	@ New England Whalers (1977–78)	23–43–5
72	L	March 24, 1978	0–4	@ Edmonton Oilers (1977–78)	23–44–5
73	L	March 28, 1978	3–4 OT	Edmonton Oilers (1977–78)	23–45–5
74	L	March 30, 1978	1–4	Winnipeg Jets (1977–78)	23–46–5

April

Game	Result	Date	Score	Opponent	Record
75	L	April 1, 1978	1–4	Edmonton Oilers (1977–78)	23–47–5
76	W	April 2, 1978	6–3	Cincinnati Stingers (1977–78)	24–47–5
77	L	April 7, 1978	4–6	Cincinnati Stingers (1977–78)	24–48–5
78	L	April 8, 1978	3–7	@ Quebec Nordiques (1977–78)	24–49–5
79	L	April 9, 1978	7–9	Birmingham Bulls (1977–78)	24–50–5
80	L	April 11, 1978	3–6	@ New England Whalers (1977–78)	24–51–5

Legend: Win (2 points) Loss (0 points) Tie (1 point)

== Player statistics ==
Regular season
Scoring

Player	Pos	GP	G	A	Pts	PIM	+/-	PPG	SHG	GWG
Claude St. Sauveur	C	72	36	42	78	24	−5	7	0	0
Kevin Morrison	D	75	17	40	57	49	−32	6	1	0
Peter Driscoll	LW	56	25	21	46	130	0	5	0	0
Rusty Patenaude	RW	76	23	19	42	71	−20	1	0	0
Kevin Devine	LW	76	19	23	42	141	−24	1	0	0
Michel Parizeau	C	70	13	27	40	47	−13	2	0	0
Reg Thomas	LW	49	15	16	31	44	−11	7	0	0
Claude Larose	LW	28	14	16	30	12	−15	3	0	0
Rosaire Paiement	C	61	6	24	30	81	−13	1	0	0
Rene Leclerc	RW	60	12	15	27	31	−7	2	0	0
Blaine Stoughton	RW	47	13	13	26	28	−24	5	0	0
Ken Block	D	77	1	25	26	34	−39	1	0	0
Rich Leduc	C	28	10	15	25	38	−16	3	0	0
Don Burgess	LW	79	11	12	23	2	−30	2	0	0
Barry Wilkins	D	79	2	21	23	79	−35	1	0	0
Daryl Maggs	D	51	6	15	21	30	−27	3	0	0
Bill Goldsworthy	RW	32	8	10	18	10	2	0	0	0
John French	C/LW	74	9	8	17	6	−25	2	2	0
Dave Fortier	D	54	1	15	16	86	−17	0	0	0
Bobby Sheehan	C	29	8	7	15	6	−19	1	3	0
Gilles Marotte	D	44	2	13	15	18	−17	0	0	0
Lynn Powis	C	14	4	6	10	2	−5	0	0	0
Dave Inkpen	D	24	1	9	10	24	−5	0	0	0
Bryon Baltimore	D	22	1	7	8	23	0	0	0	0
Hugh Harris	C	19	1	7	8	6	−4	0	0	0
Brad Rhiness	C	12	3	3	6	2	−4	0	0	0
Frank Spring	RW	13	2	4	6	2	1	1	0	0
Charles Constantin	LW	6	2	1	3	0	1	2	0	0
Ray Adduono	C	8	1	2	3	0	−5	0	0	0
Dale Smedsmo	LW	6	0	3	3	7	3	0	0	0
Bill Prentice	D	21	1	1	2	28	−4	0	0	0
Dave Dornseif	D	3	0	1	1	0	1	0	0	0
Bill Blackwood	D	3	0	0	0	0	0	0	0	0
Gary Inness	G	52	0	0	0	42	0	0	0	0
Glen Irwin	D	20	0	0	0	72	0	0	0	0
Peter McDuffe	G	12	0	0	0	0	0	0	0	0
Eddie Mio	G	17	0	0	0	0	0	0	0	0
Jim Park	G	12	0	0	0	6	0	0	0	0

Goaltending

Player	MIN	GP	W	L	T	GA	GAA	SO
Gary Inness	2850	52	14	30	4	200	4.21	0
Eddie Mio	900	17	6	8	0	64	4.27	0
Jim Park	584	12	3	7	0	41	4.21	0
Peter McDuffe	539	12	1	6	1	39	4.34	0
Team:	4873	80	24	51	5	344	4.24	0

Note: Pos = Position; GP = Games played; G = Goals; A = Assists; Pts = Points; +/- = plus/minus; PIM = Penalty minutes; PPG = Power-play goals; SHG = Short-handed goals; GWG = Game-winning goals
MIN = Minutes played; W = Wins; L = Losses; T = Ties; GA = Goals-against; GAA = Goals-against average; SO = Shutouts;

== Draft picks ==
Indianapolis's draft picks at the 1977 WHA Amateur Draft.

Round	#	Player	Nationality	College/Junior/Club team (League)
1	5	Doug Wilson (D)	Canada	Ottawa 67's (OHA)
2	16	Wayne Ramsey (D)	Canada	Brandon Wheat Kings (WCHL)
4	35	Dale McCourt (F)	Canada	St. Catharines Fincups (OHA)
5	44	Mike Bossy (F)	Canada	Laval National (QMJHL)
6	53	Rick Vasko (D)	Canada	Peterborough Petes (OHA)
7	62	Brian Drumm (LW)	Canada	Oshawa Generals (OHA)

== See also ==
- 1977–78 WHA season
