= Jim Cross (ice hockey, born 1957) =

Canadian ice hockey player

- Born: February 6, 1957 (age 69) Edmonton, Alberta, Canada
- Height: 6 ft 0 in (183 cm)
- Weight: 187 lb (85 kg; 13 st 5 lb)
- Position: Defence
- Shot: Left
- Played for: WHA; Edmonton Oilers
- WHA draft: Undrafted
- Playing career: 1977–1978

Jim Cross (born February 6, 1957) is a Canadian former professional ice hockey player. As a youth, he played in the 1967 Quebec International Pee-Wee Hockey Tournament with a minor ice hockey team from Pointe-Claire. During the 1977–78 WHA season, while playing Junior A hockey with the nearby St. Albert Saints in the AJHL, Cross was called up for two games in the World Hockey Association with the Edmonton Oilers.

== Career statistics ==
=== Regular season and playoffs ===
			Regular season					Playoffs
Season	Team	League	GP	G	A	Pts	PIM	GP	G	A	Pts	PIM
1973–74	Edmonton Mets	AJHL	Statistics Unavailable
1974–75	Spruce Grove Mets	AJHL	54	3	12	15	196	—	—	—	—	—
1974–75	Edmonton Oil Kings	WCHL	3	0	0	0	4	—	—	—	—	—
1975–76	Spruce Grove Mets	AJHL	2	0	1	1	24	—	—	—	—	—
1975–76	Edmonton Oil Kings	WCHL	71	1	8	9	111	5	0	1	1	10
1976–77	Portland Winter Hawks	WCHL	71	6	32	38	88	10	0	4	4	15
1977–78	Edmonton Oilers	WHA	2	0	0	0	0	—	—	—	—	—
1977–78	St. Albert Saints	AJHL	47	8	18	26	148	—	—	—	—	—
WHA totals			2	0	0	0	0	–	–	–	–	–
