= Peter Marrin =

Canadian ice hockey player

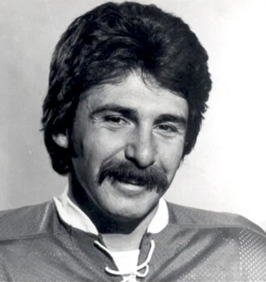
- Marrin in 1978
- Born: August 8, 1953 (age 72) Toronto, Ontario, Canada
- Height: 5 ft 10 in (178 cm)
- Weight: 180 lb (82 kg; 12 st 12 lb)
- Position: Centre
- Shot: Right
- Played for: Toronto Toros; Birmingham Bulls
- NHL draft: 22nd overall, 1973; Montreal Canadiens
- WHA draft: 43rd overall, 1973; Toronto Toros
- Playing career: 1973–1982

Peter Marrin (born August 8, 1953) is a Canadian former professional ice hockey player who played 277 games in the World Hockey Association. During his career he played with the Toronto Toros and Birmingham Bulls. As a youth, he played in the 1966 Quebec International Pee-Wee Hockey Tournament with the Toronto Weston minor ice hockey team.

== Career statistics ==
=== Regular season and playoffs ===
			Regular season					Playoffs
Season	Team	League	GP	G	A	Pts	PIM	GP	G	A	Pts	PIM
1970–71	Markham Waxers	MJBHL	Statistics Unavailable
1970–71	Toronto Marlboros	OHA	14	2	2	4	2	—	—	—	—	—
1971–72	Toronto Marlboros	OHA	43	14	29	43	21	—	—	—	—	—
1972–73	Toronto Marlboros	OHA	59	42	64	106	26	—	—	—	—	—
1973–74	Mohawk Valley Comets	NAHL	24	7	16	23	2	—	—	—	—	—
1973–74	Toronto Toros	WHA	31	1	4	5	4	3	0	1	1	0
1974–75	Mohawk Valley Comets	NAHL	54	33	45	78	36	4	1	1	2	0
1974–75	Toronto Toros	WHA	3	3	1	4	0	6	0	4	4	2
1975–76	Toronto Toros	WHA	64	22	16	38	16	—	—	—	—	—
1976–77	Birmingham Bulls	WHA	79	23	37	60	36	—	—	—	—	—
1977–78	Birmingham Bulls	WHA	80	28	43	71	53	5	0	3	3	2
1978–79	Birmingham Bulls	WHA	20	4	11	15	18	—	—	—	—	—
1979–80	Syracuse Firebirds	AHL	5	0	2	2	4	—	—	—	—	—
1979–80	Birmingham Bulls	CHL	25	3	5	8	4	4	1	0	1	0
1980–81	Hershey Bears	AHL	67	16	39	55	24	9	3	1	4	4
1981–82	Fredericton Express	AHL	54	5	29	34	18	—	—	—	—	—
WHA totals			277	81	112	193	127	14	0	8	8	4
