= Frank Turnbull =

Canadian ice hockey player (b. 1954)

- Born: January 13, 1954 (age 72) Winnipeg, Manitoba, Canada
- Height: 5 ft 8 in (173 cm)
- Weight: 150 lb (68 kg; 10 st 10 lb)
- Position: Goaltender
- Caught: Left
- Played for: WHA; Edmonton Oilers
- NHL draft: Undrafted
- WHA draft: Undrafted
- Playing career: 1975–1980

Frank Turnbull (born January 13, 1954) is a Canadian former professional ice hockey goaltender.

Between 1975–76 and 1977–78 Turnbull played four games in the World Hockey Association with the Edmonton Oilers.

== Career statistics ==
=== Regular season and playoffs ===
			Regular season									Playoffs
Season	Team	League	GP	W	L	T	MIN	GA	SO	GAA	SV%	GP	W	L	MIN	GA	SO	GAA	SV%
1969–70	Winnipeg Monarchs	WCHL	0	Statistics Unavailable
1970–71	Winnipeg Jets	WCHL	33	—	—	—	1866	123	0	3.95	.888	—	—	—	—	—	—	—	—
1971–72	Winnipeg Jets	WCHL	45	—	—	—	2554	156	1	3.66	—	—	—	—	—	—	—	—	—
1972–73	Winnipeg Jets	WCHL	42	—	—	—	1979	167	1	5.06	—	—	—	—	—	—	—	—	—
1975–76	Edmonton Oilers	WHA	3	0	1	0	106	9	0	5.09	.862	—	—	—	—	—	—	—	—
1975–76	Spokane Flyers	WIHL	29	Statistics Unavailable
1976–77	Spokane Flyers	WIHL	39	Statistics Unavailable
1977–78	Edmonton Oilers	WHA	1	0	1	0	60	6	0	6.00	.750	—	—	—	—	—	—	—	—
1977–78	Spokane Flyers	WIHL	21	Statistics Unavailable
1978–79	Spokane Flyers	PHL	29	Statistics Unavailable
1979-80	Spokane Flyers	WIHL	0	Statistics Unavailable
1982-83	Spokane Chiefs	WIHL	0	Statistics Unavailable
WHA totals			4	0	2	0	166	15	0	5.42	.831	—	—	—	—	—	—	—	—

== Awards and honours ==
Award	Year
Vince Leah Trophy - MJHL Rookie of the Year	1969–70
