= Craig Topolnisky =

Canadian ice hockey player

- Born: October 8, 1957 (age 68) Edmonton, Alberta, Canada
- Height: 5 ft 11 in (180 cm)
- Weight: 195 lb (88 kg; 13 st 13 lb)
- Position: Defence
- Shot: Right
- Played for: Edmonton Oilers (WHA)
- NHL draft: Undrafted
- Playing career: 1977–1996

Craig Topolnisky (born October 8, 1957) is a Canadian-born former professional ice hockey defenceman.

During the 1977–78 season, Topolnisky played 10 games in the World Hockey Association with the Edmonton Oilers.

== Career statistics ==
			Regular season					Playoffs
Season	Team	League	GP	G	A	Pts	PIM	GP	G	A	Pts	PIM
1984–85	Kamloops Chiefs	WCHL	65	1	5	6	20	—	—	—	—	—
1975–76	Kamloops Chiefs	WCHL	23	0	4	4	16	—	—	—	—	—
1975–76	Calgary Centennials	WCHL	52	7	19	26	28	—	—	—	—	—
1976–77	Calgary Centennials	WCHL	68	5	33	38	48	9	4	8	12	9
1977–78	Spokane Flyers	WIHL	—	9	28	37	18	—	—	—	—	—
1977–78	Edmonton Oilers	WHA	10	0	2	2	4	—	—	—	—	—
1978–79	Spokane Flyers	PHL	54	12	34	46	51	—	—	—	—	—
1980–81	EHC Essen	Germany2	19	9	9	18	30	—	—	—	—	—
1981–82	EHC Essen	Germany2	51	18	37	55	128	—	—	—	—	—
1982–83	EHC Essen	Germany2	44	14	38	52	82	—	—	—	—	—
1983–84	EHC Essen-West	Germany2	42	13	35	48	90	—	—	—	—	—
1984–85	EHC Essen-West	Germany	53	14	44	58	60	—	—	—	—	—
1986–87	Düsseldorfer EG	Germany	39	2	11	13	26	—	—	—	—	—
1987–88	Düsseldorfer EG	Germany	33	3	12	15	32	—	—	—	—	—
1988–89	EHC Essen-West	Germany2	10	2	6	8	10	18	5	14	19	40
1988–89	EHC Freiburg	Germany	24	3	4	7	28	—	—	—	—	—
1989–90	EHC Essen-West	Germany2	34	18	29	47	52	—	—	—	—	—
1990–91	EHC Essen-West	Germany2	23	7	24	31	30	—	—	—	—	—
1991–92	EC Hannover	Germany2	28	4	6	10	16	—	—	—	—	—
1991–92	EHC Essen-West	Germany2	22	1	9	10	22	—	—	—	—	—
1992–93	EC Hannover	Germany2	43	5	19	24	48	—	—	—	—	—
1993–94	EC Hannover	Germany2	46	5	13	18	49	—	—	—	—	—
1994–95	EC Hannover	DEL	37	3	6	9	46	1	0	0	0	0
1995–96	EC Bad Nauheim	Germany2	41	1	19	20	46	—	—	—	—	—
WHA totals			10	0	2	2	4	—	—	—	—	—
DEL totals			37	3	6	9	46	1	0	0	0	0
