= Howard Baldwin Trophy =

The Howard Baldwin Trophy was presented annually to the World Hockey Association's coach of the year.

It was named in honour of New England Whalers co-founder Howard Baldwin. The trophy was renamed Robert Schmertz Memorial Trophy in 1974 in honour of Schmertz, an executive with the Whalers who died that year.

== Winners ==
| Season | Coach | Team | W | L | T | Points | Ref |
|---|---|---|---|---|---|---|---|
| 1973 | Jack Kelley | New England Whalers | 46 | 10 | 2 | 94 | |
| 1974 | Billy Harris | Toronto Toros | 41 | 33 | 4 | 86 | |
| 1975 | Sandy Hucul | Phoenix Roadrunners | 39 | 31 | 8 | 86 | |
| 1976 | Bobby Kromm | Winnipeg Jets | 52 | 27 | 2 | 106 | |
| 1977 | Bill Dineen | Houston Aeros | 50 | 24 | 6 | 106 | |
| 1978 | Bill Dineen | Houston Aeros | 42 | 34 | 4 | 88 | |
| 1979 | John Brophy | Birmingham Bulls | 32 | 42 | 6 | 70 | |

== Bibliography ==
- Surgent, Scott (2008), The Complete Historical & Statistical Reference to the World Hockey Association 1972–1979 (8th ed.), Tempe, Arizona: Xaler Press, ISBN 978-0-9644774-5-2
- Greig, Murray (1997). Big Bucks and Blue Pucks. Macmillan Canada. p. 207. ISBN 978-0771574238.

== See also ==
- World Hockey Association
- List of WHA seasons
