= 1977–78 WHA season =

Professional ice hockey season

- League: World Hockey Association
- Sport: Ice hockey
- Duration: October 12, 1977 – May 22, 1978

Draft
- Top draft pick: Scott Campbell
- Picked by: Houston Aeros

Regular season
- Season champions: Winnipeg Jets
- Season MVP: Marc Tardif (Quebec)
- Top scorer: Marc Tardif (Quebec)

Playoffs
- Playoffs MVP: Bob Guindon (Jets)

Avco Cup Final
- Champions: Winnipeg Jets
- Runners-up: New England Whalers

WHA seasons
- 1976–77 1978–79

The 1977–78 WHA season was the sixth season of the World Hockey Association (WHA). Eight teams played 80 games each. The Avco World Trophy winner was the Winnipeg Jets.

== League business ==
With a reduction of three teams from the end of the previous season (the San Diego Mariners, Phoenix Roadrunners, and Calgary Cowboys folded), the WHA abandoned its divisional format and grouped the remaining eight teams together. There had been a tentative merger agreement that would have had Cincinnati, Houston, New England, Winnipeg, Quebec, and Edmonton join the NHL but it could not be finalized.

In a unique move, two international All-Star teams, the Soviet All-Stars and Czechoslovakia All-Stars, played games that counted in the regular season standings. They played each WHA team once, on the WHA team's home ice. The Soviet team acquitted themselves well, winning three plus two additional games against WHA teams outside the regular standings, tying one and losing the other four; while the Czechoslovak team only won once and tied once, losing six. This is the first time International teams competed in regular season competition in a major professional sports league in North America; those two teams as well as a Finnish team would come back to play the WHA teams the next year.

The best six teams qualified for the playoffs. However, instead of the standard schedule for a six-team playoff (i.e., giving the first and second place teams byes into the semifinals, with the third, fourth, fifth, and sixth place teams opening in the quarterfinals), the WHA came up with a unique twist. There were three quarterfinal series instead of two, with the teams paired top to bottom (i.e., 1st vs. 6th, 2nd vs. 5th, 3rd vs. 4th). The highest-seeded quarterfinal winner then received a semifinal bye and advanced directly to the finals, while the remaining two quarterfinal series winners played off in a single semifinal. All series were best four-out-of-seven games.

== Regular season ==
The Howe family of Gordie and his sons Mark and Marty moved to the New England Whalers from the Houston Aeros. The trio helped the Whalers to the Avco Cup final.

=== Final standings ===
Note: W = Wins, L = Losses, T = Ties, GF= Goals For, GA = Goals Against, Pts = Points

WHA Team	W	L	T	Pts	GF	GA	PIM
Winnipeg Jets	50	28	2	102	381	270	988
New England Whalers	44	31	5	93	335	269	1255
Houston Aeros	42	34	4	88	296	302	1543
Quebec Nordiques	40	37	3	83	349	347	1185
Edmonton Oilers	38	39	3	79	309	307	1296
Birmingham Bulls	36	41	3	75	287	314	2177
Cincinnati Stingers	35	42	3	73	298	332	1701
Indianapolis Racers	24	51	5	53	267	353	1189
Soviet All-Stars	3	4	1	7	27	36	120
Czechoslovakia All-Stars	1	6	1	3	21	40	87

== Player stats ==
=== Scoring leaders ===
_{Bolded numbers indicate season leaders}

GP = Games played; G = Goals; A = Assists; Pts = Points; PIM = Penalty minutes

Player	Team	GP	G	A	Pts	PIM
Marc Tardif	Quebec Nordiques	78	**65**	**89**	**154**	50
Real Cloutier	Quebec Nordiques	73	56	73	129	19
Ulf Nilsson	Winnipeg Jets	73	37	**89**	126	89
Anders Hedberg	Winnipeg Jets	77	63	59	122	60
Bobby Hull	Winnipeg Jets	77	46	71	117	23
Andre Lacroix	Houston Aeros	78	36	77	113	57
Robbie Ftorek	Cincinnati Stingers	80	59	50	109	54
Kent Nilsson	Winnipeg Jets	80	42	65	107	8
Gordie Howe	New England Whalers	76	34	62	96	85
Mark Howe	New England Whalers	70	30	61	91	32

=== Leading goaltenders ===
_{Bolded numbers indicate season leaders}

GP = Games played; Min = Minutes played; W = Wins; L = Losses; T = Ties, GA = Goals against; GA = Goals against; SO = Shutouts; SV% = Save percentage; GAA = Goals against average

Player	Team	GP	Min	W	L	T	GA	SO	SV%	GAA
Al Smith	New England Whalers	55	3246	**30**	20	3	174	2	88.5	**3.22**
Joe Daley	Winnipeg Jets	37	2075	21	11	1	114	1	88.3	3.30
Gary Bromley	Winnipeg Jets	39	2252	25	12	1	124	1	88.6	3.30
Jean-Louis Levasseur	New England Whalers	27	1655	14	11	2	91	3	88.6	3.30
Ernie Wakely	Cincinnati – Houston	57	**3381**	28	23	4	192	2	**89.1**	3.41

== All-Star Game ==
The 1978 WHA All-Star game pitted the defending champion Quebec Nordiques against the stars from the remaining WHA teams. The game was played on 17 January 1978, in Quebec City, and attracted 6,413 spectators. The Nordiques, coached by Marc Boileau, won the game 5–4. Marc Tardif and Mark Howe were named the players of the game.

== Avco World Cup playoffs ==
Quarterfinals
2	New England Whalers	4
5	Edmonton Oilers	1
3	Houston Aeros	2
4	Quebec Nordiques	4
1	Winnipeg Jets	4
6	Birmingham Bulls	1

Semifinals
2	New England Whalers	4
4	Quebec Nordiques	1

Finals
1	Winnipeg Jets	4
2	New England Whalers	0

== WHA awards ==
=== Trophies ===
Avco World Trophy:	Winnipeg Jets
Gordie Howe Trophy:	Marc Tardif, Quebec Nordiques
Bill Hunter Trophy:	Marc Tardif, Quebec Nordiques
Lou Kaplan Trophy:	Kent Nilsson, Winnipeg Jets
Ben Hatskin Trophy:	Al Smith, New England Whalers
Dennis A. Murphy Trophy:	Lars-Erik Sjoberg, Winnipeg Jets
Paul Deneau Trophy:	Dave Keon, New England Whalers
Robert Schmertz Memorial Trophy:	Bill Dineen, Houston Aeros
WHA Playoff MVP:	Robert Guindon, Winnipeg Jets

=== All-Star Team ===
Position	First Team	Second Team
Centre	Ulf Nilsson, Winnipeg	Robbie Ftorek, Cincinnati
Right Wing	Anders Hedberg, Winnipeg	Real Cloutier, Quebec
Left Wing	Marc Tardif, Quebec	Bobby Hull, Winnipeg
Defence	Lars-Erik Sjoberg, Winnipeg	Rick Ley, New England
Defence	Al Hamilton, Edmonton	Barry Long, Winnipeg
Goaltender	Al Smith, New England	Ernie Wakely, Houston

== See also ==
- 1977 WHA Amateur Draft
- 1977–78 NHL season
