= Birmingham Bulls (WHA) =

Former ice hockey team of the World Hockey Association

- City: Birmingham, Alabama
- League: World Hockey Association (1976–1979); Central Hockey League (1979–1981)
- Operated: 1976–1981
- Home arena: Birmingham–Jefferson Convention Complex
- Colors: Blue, red, white
- Media: WBRC-TV; WAPI

Franchise history
- 1972–1973: Ottawa Nationals
- 1973 playoffs: Ontario Nationals
- 1973–1976: Toronto Toros
- 1976–1981: Birmingham Bulls

The Birmingham Bulls were a professional ice hockey team based in Birmingham, Alabama. They played in the World Hockey Association from 1976 to 1979 and the Central Hockey League from 1979 to 1981. The Bulls played their home games at the Birmingham Jefferson Convention Center.

Prior to being in Birmingham, the team was known as the Ottawa Nationals and the Toronto Toros. The Birmingham Bulls' name has been used for other hockey teams such as the Birmingham Bulls of the East Coast Hockey League and the Birmingham Bulls of the Southern Professional Hockey League.

== History ==
The Toros had been modestly successful on the ice since moving to Toronto before the start of the 1973–74 season and had drawn fairly well by WHA standards. However, onerous lease terms at Maple Leaf Gardens led owner John F. Bassett to move to Birmingham.

After the move to Birmingham, general manager, Gilles Leger coached the team for a few games until Pat Kelly was brought in to coach the bulk of that first season (1976–77) in Birmingham. In the 1977–78 season, former Minnesota Golden Gophers coach Glen Sonmor was hired to lead the team as head coach and general manager. Sonmor organized a very physical and aggressive team that was the most penalized in the league for their rough play. They set a team record for penalty minutes that stood for decades in all of professional ice hockey. They were often called the "Birmingham Bullies", a play off of the nickname "Broad Street Bullies" that the Philadelphia Flyers had earned years earlier, whose own record for penalty minutes the Birmingham Bulls had broken. This new approach to being the bullies debuted on a Thanksgiving Day game in Birmingham against the Cincinnati Stingers. That game started with ten players in the penalty box within the first minute of play. The Bulls won 12–2 and the game was dubbed by a newspaper as the "Thanksgiving Day Massacre". This was the only one of the three WHA Birmingham Bulls teams to qualify for the WHA playoffs. Facing Bobby Hull and the Winnipeg Jets, who went on to win the championship, they were eliminated in the first round. During Sonmor's tenure as general manager, he successfully negotiated the first "cross-league" player trade with the NHL in a deal with the Detroit Red Wings.

John Brophy, who later went on to coach the Maple Leafs, had joined head coach Glen Sonmor as an assistant for the second year in Birmingham. Brophy became head coach in the 1978–79 season when Sonmor joined the Minnesota North Stars. His team finished last in the league, but was in the middle of a youth movement in transitioning from being overly physical to highly skilled and was known among the fans as the "Baby Bulls". Wayne Gretzky was heavily recruited by Birmingham Bulls owner John Bassett to be part of the youth movement. Bassett wanted to confront the NHL by signing as many young and promising superstars as possible and saw Gretzky as the most promising young prospect. Although Bassett failed to sign Gretzky, the Bulls included several future NHL stars at the beginning of their professional careers such as Rick Vaive, Michel Goulet, Rob Ramage, Pat Riggin, Craig Hartsburg, Gaston Gingras and Rod Langway, as well as a 36-year-old Paul Henderson. Even though his team was the only one in the league not to make the playoffs, Brophy was awarded the Robert Schmertz Memorial Trophy as the WHA's coach of the year.

== After the WHA ==
The Bulls were not included in the NHL–WHA merger of 1979. Even without the WHA's insistence that all of its surviving Canadian teams be included, the NHL was skeptical about putting another team in the south due to the struggles of the Atlanta Flames (who moved to Calgary a year later).

After the WHA ceased operations in 1979, the Birmingham Bulls joined the Central Hockey League, playing during the 1979–80 and 1980–81 seasons. The CHL team included returning coach John Brophy, and six players carried over from the previous season's WHA team, including Paul Henderson, Pat Riggin, Rick Adduono, and Dave Hanson. The team disbanded during its second season.

Simultaneous with the merger, the NHL lowered its minimum age from 20 to 18, making a number of previously underage members of the Bulls eligible for the 1979 NHL entry draft. The Colorado Rockies used the first overall pick to select a former member of the Bulls, Rob Ramage. A total of four former Bulls were selected in the first round (including three of the first six picks), with another two Bulls being selected in the second round. The last active NHL player from the Bulls was Michel Goulet and Rob Ramage, who both retired in 1994 as a member of the Chicago Blackhawks and Philadelphia Flyers. In 2001, Rick Vaive came out of retirement to play in the Allan Cup Hockey until retiring in 2003.

Major professional hockey has never returned to Birmingham, although the NHL returned to the South in the 1990s in a series of expansions and franchise re-locations. In 2017, a minor league expansion team was established using the Birmingham Bulls name. They currently compete in the Southern Professional Hockey League and play their home games at the Pelham Civic Center, located 20 minutes south of downtown Birmingham.

== Season-by-season record ==
Note: GP = Games played, W = Wins, L = Losses, T = Ties, Pts = Points, GF = Goals for, GA = Goals against, PIM = Penalties in minutes

World Hockey Association

Season	GP	W	L	T	Pts	GF	GA	PIM	Finish	Playoffs
1976–77	81	31	46	4	66	289	309	1179	5th, Eastern	Did not qualify
1977–78	80	36	41	3	75	287	314	2177	6th, WHA	Lost Quarterfinals (Jets)
1978–79	80	32	42	6	70	286	311	1661	6th, WHA	Did not qualify
Totals	241	99	129	13	211	862	934	5017

Central Hockey League

Season	GP	W	L	T	Pts	GF	GA	PIM	Finish	Playoffs
1979–80	80	36	39	5	77	260	295	1595	4th, CHL	Lost first round
1980–81	58	17	37	4	38	204	277	1593	n/a	Incomplete season
Season	138	53	76	9	115	464	572	3188

== See also ==
- List of Birmingham Bulls (WHA) players
- List of WHA seasons
- Birmingham Bulls (ECHL)
