= 1978–79 Indianapolis Racers season =

World Hockey Association team season

1978–79 Indianapolis Racers
- League: 7th WHA
- 1978–79 record: 5–18–2
- Home record: 4–8–1
- Road record: 1–10–1
- Goals for: 78
- Goals against: 130

Team information
- Coach: Pat Stapleton
- Arena: Market Square Arena

Team leaders
- Goals: Blaine Stoughton (9)
- Assists: Al McLeod (11)
- Points: Don Larway; Blaine Stoughton (18)
- Penalty minutes: Glen Irwin (124)
- Wins: Gary Inness (3)
- Goals against average: Eddie Mio (3.22)

The 1978–79 Indianapolis Racers season was the Racers' final season in the World Hockey Association (WHA). The team folded after only 25 games.

== Offseason ==
Nelson Skalbania, the owner of Indianapolis Racers, signed the 17-year-old future super-star, Wayne Gretzky to, at that time, a whopping personal contract worth between 1.125 and 1.75 million dollars over 4 to 7 years. Skalbania, knowing that the WHA was fading, felt owning the young star was more valuable than owning a WHA team.

== Regular season ==
This was the first season of Wayne Gretzky's professional career. The Racers' management knew that the team was going to fold due to poor attendance, and sold Gretzky to the Edmonton Oilers after eight games. Skalbania needed cash and liquidated his greatest asset to his old friend and former partner, Peter Pocklington, owner of the Edmonton Oilers. Pocklington purchased Gretzky and two other Indianapolis players, goaltender Eddie Mio and forward Peter Driscoll paying $700,000 for the contracts of the three players, although the announced price was actually $850,000.

=== Final standings ===
Note: W = Wins, L = Losses, T = Ties, GF= Goals for, GA = Goals against, Pts = Points

WHA Team	GP	W	L	T	Pts	GF	GA	PIM
Edmonton Oilers	80	48	30	2	98	340	266	1220
Quebec Nordiques	80	41	34	5	87	288	271	1399
Winnipeg Jets	80	39	35	6	84	307	306	1342
New England Whalers	80	37	34	9	83	298	287	1090
Cincinnati Stingers	80	33	41	6	72	274	284	1651
Birmingham Bulls	80	32	42	6	70	286	311	1661
xIndianapolis Racers	25	5	18	2	12	78	130	557
#Soviet All-Stars	6	4	1	1	9	27	20	77
#Czechoslovakia	6	1	4	1	3	14	33	107
#Finland	1	0	1	0	0	4	8	2

x-team folded during season #-played limited schedule

== Schedule and results ==
1978–79 regular season
October

Game	Result	Date	Score	Opponent	Record
1	L	October 14, 1978	3–6	Winnipeg Jets (1978–79)	0–1–0
2	L	October 15, 1978	3–9	Birmingham Bulls (1978–79)	0–2–0
3	W	October 18, 1978	4–0	@ Quebec Nordiques (1978–79)	1–2–0
4	L	October 20, 1978	3–4	Edmonton Oilers (1978–79)	1–3–0
5	L	October 22, 1978	3–6	New England Whalers (1978–79)	1–4–0
6	L	October 27, 1978	2–4	@ Birmingham Bulls (1978–79)	1–5–0
7	W	October 28, 1978	3–2	Winnipeg Jets (1978–79)	2–5–0
8	T	October 29, 1978	3–3	@ Winnipeg Jets (1978–79)	2–5–1

November

Game	Result	Date	Score	Opponent	Record
9	L	November 3, 1978	3–6	@ New England Whalers (1978–79)	2–6–1
10	T	November 4, 1978	6–6	New England Whalers (1978–79)	2–6–2
11	L	November 5, 1978	2–6	@ Winnipeg Jets (1978–79)	2–7–2
12	L	November 8, 1978	0–4	@ Cincinnati Stingers (1978–79)	2–8–2
13	L	November 11, 1978	2–8	@ Quebec Nordiques (1978–79)	2–9–2
14	L	November 17, 1978	1–6	@ Edmonton Oilers (1978–79)	2–10–2
15	L	November 19, 1978	2–5	@ Winnipeg Jets (1978–79)	2–11–2
16	L	November 23, 1978	1–5	Winnipeg Jets (1978–79)	2–12–2
17	L	November 24, 1978	5–8	@ Cincinnati Stingers (1978–79)	2–13–2
18	W	November 25, 1978	6–3	Cincinnati Stingers (1978–79)	3–13–2
19	L	November 28, 1978	2–8	@ Edmonton Oilers (1978–79)	3–14–2

December

Game	Result	Date	Score	Opponent	Record
20	W	December 1, 1978	6–3	Birmingham Bulls (1978–79)	4–14–2
21	L	December 2, 1978	2–4	@ Birmingham Bulls (1978–79)	4–15–2
22	L	December 3, 1978	2–4	Cincinnati Stingers (1978–79)	4–16–2
23	L	December 7, 1978	4–9	Winnipeg Jets (1978–79)	4–17–2
24	W	December 10, 1978	6–4	Edmonton Oilers (1978–79)	5–17–2
25	L	December 12, 1978	4–7	New England Whalers (1978–79)	5–18–2

Legend: Win (2 points) Loss (0 points) Tie (1 point)

== Player statistics ==
=== Regular season ===
Scoring

Player	Pos	GP	G	A	Pts	PIM	+/-	PPG	SHG	GWG
Blaine Stoughton	RW	25	9	9	18	16	−18	3	0	
Don Larway	RW	25	8	10	18	39	−20	2	0	
Rich LeDuc	C	13	5	9	14	14	−2	2	0	
Claude Larose	LW	13	5	8	13	0	5	0	0	
Michel Parizeau	C	22	4	9	13	4	−1	0	0	
Gary MacGregor	C	17	8	4	12	0	−12	1	0	
Rene Leclerc	RW	22	5	7	12	12	2	1	0	
Dave Morrow	D/LW	10	2	10	12	29	−13	0	0	
Larry Sacharuk	D	15	2	9	11	25	−11	2	0	
Al McLeod	D	25	0	11	11	22	0	0	0	
Bruce Greig	LW	21	3	7	10	64	−5	0	0	
Kevin Nugent	RW	25	2	8	10	20	−2	0	0	
Dave Inkpen	D	25	1	8	9	22	−5	0	0	
John Hughes	D	22	3	4	7	48	−16	0	0	
Wes George	LW	9	4	2	6	23	−11	1	0	
Claude St. Sauveur	C	17	4	2	6	12	−6	2	0	
Wayne Gretzky	C	8	3	3	6	0	−3	0	0	
Ken Block	D	22	2	3	5	10	−11	0	0	
Peter Driscoll	LW	8	3	1	4	17	1	1	0	
Angie Moretto	C	18	3	1	4	2	−6	1	0	
Gerry Leroux	LW	10	0	3	3	2	−4	0	0	
Bryon Baltimore	D	2	1	1	2	2	−1	0	0	
Don Burgess	LW	3	1	1	2	0	−4	0	0	
Kevin Morrison	D	5	0	2	2	0	−10	0	0	
Glen Irwin	D	24	0	1	1	124	−10	0	0	
Dean Magee	LW	5	0	1	1	10	−2	0	0	
Jerry Rollins	D	7	0	1	1	7	−4	0	0	
Gary Inness	G	10	0	0	0	9	0	0	0	
Mark Messier	C	5	0	0	0	0	−4	0	0	
Eddie Mio	G	5	0	0	0	2	0	0	0	
Gary Smith	G	11	0	0	0	8	0	0	0	

Goaltending

Player	MIN	GP	W	L	T	GA	GAA	SO
Gary Inness	609	10	3	6	1	51	5.02	0
Eddie Mio	242	5	2	2	0	13	3.22	1
Gary Smith	664	11	0	10	1	61	5.51	0
Team:	1515	25	5	18	2	125	4.95	1

Note: Pos = Position; GP = Games played; G = Goals; A = Assists; Pts = Points; +/- = plus/minus; PIM = Penalty minutes; PPG = Power-play goals; SHG = Short-handed goals; GWG = Game-winning goals
MIN = Minutes played; W = Wins; L = Losses; T = Ties; GA = Goals-against; GAA = Goals-against average; SO = Shutouts;

== See also ==
- 1978–79 WHA season
