= 1978–79 Edmonton Oilers season =

WHA hockey team season (last season of WHA)

1978–79 Edmonton Oilers
- Division: 1st WHA
- 1978–79 record: 48–30–2
- Home record: 29–11–1
- Road record: 19–19–1
- Goals for: 340
- Goals against: 266

Team information
- General manager: Larry Gordon
- Coach: Glen Sather
- Captain: Paul Shmyr
- Alternate captains: Ron Chipperfield; Peter Driscoll; Al Hamilton; Blair MacDonald
- Arena: Northlands Coliseum
- Minor league affiliates: Springfield Indians (AHL); Dallas Black Hawks (CHL)

Team leaders
- Goals: Wayne Gretzky (43)
- Assists: Wayne Gretzky (61)
- Points: Wayne Gretzky (104)
- Penalty minutes: Dave Semenko (158)
- Plus/minus: Paul Shmyr (+37)
- Wins: Dave Dryden (41)
- Goals against average: Dave Dryden (2.89)

The 1978–79 Edmonton Oilers season was the Oilers' seventh season of operation. The Oilers placed first and made it to the Avco Cup Final, losing to the Winnipeg Jets. This was the organization's last season in the WHA before joining the National Hockey League.

== Regular season ==
=== Final standings ===
Note: W = Wins, L = Losses, T = Ties, GF= Goals for, GA = Goals against, Pts = Points

WHA Team	GP	W	L	T	Pts	GF	GA	PIM
Edmonton Oilers	80	48	30	2	98	340	266	1220
Quebec Nordiques	80	41	34	5	87	288	271	1399
Winnipeg Jets	80	39	35	6	84	307	306	1342
New England Whalers	80	37	34	9	83	298	287	1090
Cincinnati Stingers	80	33	41	6	72	274	284	1651
Birmingham Bulls	80	32	42	6	70	286	311	1661
xIndianapolis Racers	25	5	18	2	12	78	130	557
#Soviet All-Stars	6	4	1	1	9	27	20	77
#Czechoslovakia	6	1	4	1	3	14	33	107
#Finland	1	0	1	0	0	4	8	2

x-team folded during season #-played limited schedule

== Schedule and results ==
1978–79 regular season
October

Game	Result	Date	Score	Opponent	Record
1	W	October 13, 1978	3–2	Cincinnati Stingers (1978–79)	1–0–0
2	L	October 17, 1978	1–2	New England Whalers (1978–79)	1–1–0
3	W	October 20, 1978	4–3	@ Indianapolis Racers (1978–79)	2–1–0
4	L	October 21, 1978	3–4	@ Cincinnati Stingers (1978–79)	2–2–0
5	W	October 22, 1978	6–2	@ Winnipeg Jets (1978–79)	3–2–0
6	L	October 24, 1978	2–3	Birmingham Bulls (1978–79)	3–3–0
7	L	October 29, 1978	2–6	Quebec Nordiques (1978–79)	3–4–0
8	L	October 31, 1978	4–5	Quebec Nordiques (1978–79)	3–5–0

November

Game	Result	Date	Score	Opponent	Record
9	W	November 3, 1978	4–3 OT	Winnipeg Jets (1978–79)	4–5–0
10	L	November 5, 1978	0–2	@ Quebec Nordiques (1978–79)	4–6–0
11	W	November 8, 1978	6–5	@ Quebec Nordiques (1978–79)	5–6–0
12	L	November 9, 1978	1–6	@ New England Whalers (1978–79)	5–7–0
13	W	November 11, 1978	5–3	@ Birmingham Bulls (1978–79)	6–7–0
14	L	November 12, 1978	3–5	@ Cincinnati Stingers (1978–79)	6–8–0
15	W	November 17, 1978	6–1	Indianapolis Racers (1978–79)	7–8–0
16	W	November 19, 1978	6–3	Cincinnati Stingers (1978–79)	8–8–0
17	W	November 21, 1978	4–1	Quebec Nordiques (1978–79)	9–8–0
18	W	November 24, 1978	4–3 OT	Quebec Nordiques (1978–79)	10–8–0
19	W	November 28, 1978	8–2	Indianapolis Racers (1978–79)	11–8–0

December

Game	Result	Date	Score	Opponent	Record
20	W	December 1, 1978	8–2	New England Whalers (1978–79)	12–8–0
21	L	December 3, 1978	0–7	New England Whalers (1978–79)	12–9–0
22	L	December 6, 1978	3–6	@ Quebec Nordiques (1978–79)	12–10–0
23	L	December 7, 1978	3–5	@ New England Whalers (1978–79)	12–11–0
24	L	December 9, 1978	2–6	@ Birmingham Bulls (1978–79)	12–12–0
25	L	December 10, 1978	4–6	@ Indianapolis Racers (1978–79)	12–13–0
26	W	December 12, 1978	5–2	@ Cincinnati Stingers (1978–79)	13–13–0
27	W	December 15, 1978	5–3	Soviet All-Stars (1978–79)	14–13–0
28	W	December 19, 1978	5–2	@ Birmingham Bulls (1978–79)	15–13–0
29	L	December 22, 1978	4–5	Winnipeg Jets (1978–79)	15–14–0
30	L	December 26, 1978	3–5	@ Winnipeg Jets (1978–79)	15–15–0
31	W	December 27, 1978	5–3	Winnipeg Jets (1978–79)	16–15–0
32	W	December 30, 1978	5–1	Czechoslovakia (1978–79)	17–15–0

January

Game	Result	Date	Score	Opponent	Record
33	L	January 9, 1979	3–4 OT	@ Winnipeg Jets (1978–79)	17–16–0
34	W	January 13, 1979	3–0	@ New England Whalers (1978–79)	18–16–0
35	W	January 16, 1979	3–1	Winnipeg Jets (1978–79)	19–16–0
36	W	January 17, 1979	6–3	@ Winnipeg Jets (1978–79)	20–16–0
37	W	January 19, 1979	11–3	Birmingham Bulls (1978–79)	21–16–0
38	L	January 21, 1979	3–4	Birmingham Bulls (1978–79)	21–17–0
39	W	January 23, 1979	5–1	New England Whalers (1978–79)	22–17–0
40	L	January 26, 1979	2–5	Cincinnati Stingers (1978–79)	22–18–0
41	W	January 28, 1979	3–0	Cincinnati Stingers (1978–79)	23–18–0
42	L	January 31, 1979	3–6	@ Winnipeg Jets (1978–79)	23–19–0

February

Game	Result	Date	Score	Opponent	Record
43	L	February 2, 1979	2–4	@ Winnipeg Jets (1978–79)	23–20–0
44	L	February 4, 1979	3–6	@ Quebec Nordiques (1978–79)	23–21–0
45	W	February 6, 1979	6–2	Birmingham Bulls (1978–79)	24–21–0
46	W	February 7, 1979	8–5	Cincinnati Stingers (1978–79)	25–21–0
47	W	February 9, 1979	3–0	Quebec Nordiques (1978–79)	26–21–0
48	W	February 11, 1979	4–3 OT	Birmingham Bulls (1978–79)	27–21–0
49	W	February 13, 1979	6–1	Quebec Nordiques (1978–79)	28–21–0
50	W	February 16, 1979	4–2	@ New England Whalers (1978–79)	29–21–0
51	W	February 18, 1979	6–3	@ Birmingham Bulls (1978–79)	30–21–0
52	W	February 20, 1979	8–2	New England Whalers (1978–79)	31–21–0
53	W	February 23, 1979	3–1	Cincinnati Stingers (1978–79)	32–21–0
54	W	February 25, 1979	5–4	Birmingham Bulls (1978–79)	33–21–0
55	T	February 27, 1979	1–1	New England Whalers (1978–79)	33–21–1

March

Game	Result	Date	Score	Opponent	Record
56	W	March 2, 1979	5–2	Cincinnati Stingers (1978–79)	34–21–1
57	W	March 3, 1979	6–4	@ Cincinnati Stingers (1978–79)	35–21–1
58	L	March 6, 1979	3–4	@ Quebec Nordiques (1978–79)	35–22–1
59	L	March 7, 1979	3–6	@ Quebec Nordiques (1978–79)	35–23–1
60	T	March 9, 1979	4–4	@ Birmingham Bulls (1978–79)	35–23–2
61	W	March 11, 1979	4–0	@ Birmingham Bulls (1978–79)	36–23–2
62	L	March 13, 1979	1–5	@ Cincinnati Stingers (1978–79)	36–24–2
63	W	March 16, 1979	6–1	Quebec Nordiques (1978–79)	37–24–2
64	L	March 18, 1979	2–7	Quebec Nordiques (1978–79)	37–25–2
65	W	March 20, 1979	8–4	Finland (1978–79)	38–25–2
66	W	March 21, 1979	7–4	@ Winnipeg Jets (1978–79)	39–25–2
67	L	March 23, 1979	4–6	Winnipeg Jets (1978–79)	39–26–2
68	W	March 25, 1979	6–5	@ Cincinnati Stingers (1978–79)	40–26–2
69	L	March 28, 1979	0–3	@ Quebec Nordiques (1978–79)	40–27–2
70	W	March 30, 1979	3–1	@ New England Whalers (1978–79)	41–27–2

April

Game	Result	Date	Score	Opponent	Record
71	W	April 1, 1979	5–3	@ New England Whalers (1978–79)	42–27–2
72	W	April 3, 1979	5–1	@ Cincinnati Stingers (1978–79)	43–27–2
73	L	April 4, 1979	2–4	@ Quebec Nordiques (1978–79)	43–28–2
74	W	April 6, 1979	7–2	New England Whalers (1978–79)	44–28–2
75	W	April 8, 1979	5–4	Birmingham Bulls (1978–79)	45–28–2
76	L	April 10, 1979	4–6	Winnipeg Jets (1978–79)	45–29–2
77	W	April 13, 1979	6–4	@ Birmingham Bulls (1978–79)	46–29–2
78	L	April 14, 1979	6–7	@ Birmingham Bulls (1978–79)	46–30–2
79	W	April 15, 1979	4–1	@ New England Whalers (1978–79)	47–30–2
80	W	April 18, 1979	9–3	Winnipeg Jets (1978–79)	48–30–2

Legend: Win (2 points) Loss (0 points) Tie (1 point)

== Playoffs ==
1979 Avco Cup playoffs
Semifinals vs. (4) New England Whalers – Oilers win 4–3

Game	Date	Visitor	Score	Home	Series
1	April 26	New England	2 – 6	Edmonton	1–0
2	April 27	New England	5 – 9	Edmonton	2–0
3	April 29	Edmonton	1 – 4	New England	2–1
4	May 1	Edmonton	4 – 5	New England	2–2
5	May 3	New England	2 – 5	Edmonton	3–2
6	May 6	Edmonton	8 – 4	New England	3–3
7	May 8	New England	3 – 6	Edmonton	4–3

Avco Cup Finals vs. (3) Winnipeg Jets – Jets win 4–2

Game	Date	Visitor	Score	Home	Series
1	May 11	Winnipeg Jets	3–1	Edmonton Oilers	0–1
2	May 13	Winnipeg Jets	3–2	Edmonton Oilers	0–2
3	May 15	Edmonton Oilers	8–3	Winnipeg Jets	1–2
4	May 16	Edmonton Oilers	2–3	Winnipeg Jets	1–3
5	May 18	Winnipeg Jets	2–10	Edmonton Oilers	2–3
6	May 20	Edmonton Oilers	3–7	Winnipeg Jets	2–4

Legend: Win Loss

== Player statistics ==
Regular season
Scoring

Player	Pos	GP	G	A	Pts	PIM	+/-	PPG	SHG	GWG
Wayne Gretzky	C	72	43	61	104	19	23	9	0	0
Blair MacDonald	RW	80	34	37	71	44	35	3	4	0
Brett Callighen	C	71	31	39	70	79	29	12	0	0
Ron Chipperfield	C	55	32	37	69	47	25	6	0	0
Bill Flett	RW	73	28	36	64	14	26	9	0	0
Dennis Sobchuk	C	74	26	37	63	31	24	6	1	0
Stan Weir	C	68	31	30	61	20	24	3	0	0
Joe Micheletti	D	72	14	33	47	85	10	3	0	0
Paul Shmyr	D	80	8	39	47	119	37	0	0	0
Al Hamilton	D	80	6	38	44	38	22	2	0	0
Steve Carlson	C	73	18	22	40	50	15	4	3	0
Peter Driscoll	LW	69	17	23	40	115	16	3	0	0
Dave Hunter	LW	72	7	25	32	134	7	0	0	0
Claire Alexander	D	54	8	23	31	16	-5	2	1	0
Dave Langevin	D	77	6	21	27	76	33	3	0	0
Dave Semenko	LW	77	10	14	24	158	-12	2	0	0
John Hughes	D	41	2	15	17	82	22	0	0	0
Doug Berry	C	29	6	3	9	4	-9	1	0	0
Garnet Bailey	LW	38	5	4	9	22	-8	1	0	0
Dave Dryden	G	63	0	8	8	0	0	0	0	0
Risto Siltanen	D	20	3	4	7	4	4	0	0	0
Bill Goldsworthy	RW	17	4	2	6	14	-3	0	0	0
Jim Neilson	D	35	0	5	5	18	5	0	0	0
Pierre Guite	LW	12	1	1	2	8	-5	1	0	0
Eddie Mio	G	22	0	1	1	2	0	0	0	0
Wes George	LW	3	0	0	0	11	1	0	0	0
Hannu Kamppuri	G	2	0	0	0	0	0	0	0	0
Jim Mayer	RW	2	0	0	0	0	-2	0	0	0
Cal Sandbeck	D	6	0	0	0	2	-2	0	0	0
Rudy Tajcnar	D	2	0	0	0	0	-4	0	0	0
Ed Walsh	G	3	0	0	0	0	0	0	0	0

Goaltending

Player	MIN	GP	W	L	T	GA	GAA	SO
Dave Dryden	3531	63	41	17	2	170	2.89	3
Eddie Mio	1068	22	7	10	0	71	3.99	1
Hannu Kamppuri	90	2	0	1	0	10	6.67	0
Ed Walsh	144	3	0	2	0	9	3.75	0
Team:	4833	80	48	30	2	260	3.23	4

Playoffs
Scoring

Player	Pos	GP	G	A	Pts	PIM	PPG	SHG	GWG
Wayne Gretzky	C	13	10	10	20	2	0	0	1
Ron Chipperfield	C	13	9	10	19	8	0	0	0
Blair MacDonald	RW	13	8	10	18	6	0	0	0
Brett Callighen	C	13	5	10	15	15	0	0	1
Dennis Sobchuk	C	12	6	6	12	4	0	0	1
Al Hamilton	D	13	4	5	9	4	0	0	0
Joe Micheletti	D	13	0	9	9	2	0	0	0
Risto Siltanen	D	11	0	9	9	4	0	0	0
Bill Flett	RW	10	5	2	7	2	0	0	1
Stan Weir	C	13	2	5	7	2	0	0	1
Peter Driscoll	LW	13	1	6	7	8	0	0	0
Dave Semenko	LW	11	4	2	6	29	0	0	0
Paul Shmyr	D	13	1	5	6	23	0	0	0
Dave Hunter	LW	13	2	3	5	42	0	0	0
Bengt-Ake Gustafsson	RW	2	1	2	3	0	0	0	0
Steve Carlson	C	11	1	1	2	12	0	0	0
Bill Goldsworthy	RW	4	1	1	2	11	0	0	1
John Hughes	D	13	1	0	1	35	0	0	0
Dave Dryden	G	13	0	1	1	0	0	0	0
Dave Langevin	D	13	0	1	1	25	0	0	0
Garnet Bailey	LW	2	0	0	0	4	0	0	0
Eddie Mio	G	3	0	0	0	0	0	0	0

Goaltending

Player	MIN	GP	W	L	GA	GAA	SO
Dave Dryden	687	13	6	7	42	3.67	0
Eddie Mio	90	3	0	0	6	4.00	0
Team:	777	13	6	7	48	3.71	0

Note: Pos = Position; GP = Games played; G = Goals; A = Assists; Pts = Points; +/- = plus/minus; PIM = Penalty minutes; PPG = Power-play goals; SHG = Short-handed goals; GWG = Game-winning goals
MIN = Minutes played; W = Wins; L = Losses; T = Ties; GA = Goals-against; GAA = Goals-against average; SO = Shutouts;

== Awards and records ==
Regular Season
Player	Milestone	Reached
Claire Alexander	1st WHA Game; 1st WHA Goal; 1st WHA Assist; 1st WHA Point	October 13, 1978
Dave Hunter	1st WHA Game	
Dave Hunter	1st WHA Assist; 1st WHA Point	October 20, 1978
Ed Walsh	1st WHA Game	October 21, 1978
Doug Berry	1st WHA Goal; 1st WHA Point	October 22, 1978
Garnet Bailey	1st WHA Goal; 1st WHA Point	October 31, 1978
Brett Callighen	100th WHA Point	November 8, 1978
Stan Weir	1st WHA Assist; 1st WHA Point	November 8, 1978
Garnet Bailey	1st WHA Assist	November 11, 1978
Doug Berry	1st WHA Assist	November 19, 1978
Dave Hunter	1st WHA Goal	November 19, 1978
Stan Weir	1st WHA Goal	November 21, 1978
Jim Neilson	1st WHA Assist	November 24, 1978
Stan Weir	1st WHA Hat-Trick	November 28, 1978
Wayne Gretzky	1st WHA Hat-Trick	December 12, 1978
Dave Dryden	200th WHA Game	December 19, 1978
Wayne Gretzky	2nd WHA Hat-Trick	January 13, 1978
Dennis Sobchuk	300th WHA Point	January 28, 1979
Ron Chipperfield	300th WHA Point	February 7, 1979
Dave Dryden	100th WHA Win	February 23, 1979
Paul Shmyr	300th WHA Point	March 16, 1979
Risto Siltanen	1st WHA Goal	March 18, 1979
Al Hamilton	300th WHA Point	March 20, 1979
Hannu Kamppuri	1st WHA Game	March 20, 1979
Peter Driscoll	100th WHA Assist	April 4, 1979
Bill Flett	100th WHA Goal	April 4, 1979
Wayne Gretzky	3rd WHA Hat-Trick	April 10, 1979
Wayne Gretzky	100th WHA Point	April 13, 1979
Joe Micheletti	100th WHA Point	April 14, 1979
Wayne Gretzky	4th WHA Hat-Trick	April 15, 1979

== Transactions ==
=== Trades ===
Date	To Edmonton Oilers	Traded to	Traded for
June 16, 1978	Bill Goldsworthy	Indianapolis Racers	Juha Widing
September 17, 1978	Larry Hendrick	Minnesota North Stars (NHL)	Cash
November 2, 1978	Peter Driscoll; Eddie Mio; Wayne Gretzky	Indianapolis Racers	($850,000) Cash

=== Players acquired ===
Date	Player	Former team	Term
June 8, 1978	Claire Alexander	Vancouver Canucks (NHL)	1-year
June 15, 1978	Wes George	Saskatoon Blades (WCHL)	3-year
June 15, 1978	Stan Weir	Toronto Maple Leafs (NHL)	2-year
June 22, 1978	Dave Hunter	Montreal Canadiens (NHL)	5-year
June 22, 1978	Ed Walsh	Montreal Canadiens (NHL)	2-year
July 6, 1978	Matti Hagman	Quebec Nordiques	
July 6, 1978	Mark Napier	Birmingham Bulls	
August 18, 1978	George Buat	Seattle Breakers (WCHL)	
August 18, 1978	Ron Carter	Sherbrooke Castors (QMJHL)	2-year
September 5, 1978	Jim Neilson	Cleveland Barons (NHL)	
November 19, 1978	Rudolf Tajcnar	Maine Mariners (AHL)	
December 17, 1978	John Hughes	Indianapolis Racers	
March 4, 1979	Mike Brown	New York Rangers (NHL)	
March 6, 1979	Hannu Kamppuri	Jokerit Helsinki (Liiga)	1-year
March 6, 1979	Risto Siltanen	Ilves Tampere (Liiga)	1-year
March 8, 1979	Mark Miller	Pittsburgh Penguins (NHL)	
March 21, 1979	Bengt-Ake Gustafsson	Färjestad BK Karlstad (Elitserien)	2-year

=== Players lost ===
Date	Player	New team
	Ron Busniuk	Retired
	Bryan Campbell	Retired
	Bob Falkenberg	Retired
	Norm Ferguson	Retired
	Gavin Kirk	Birmingham Bulls
	Gary MacGregor	Indianapolis Racers
	Don McLeod	Retired
	Gerry Pinder	Retired
	Randy Rota	Retired
July 6, 1978	Pierre Jarry	Indianapolis Racers
July 6, 1978	Don McLeod	Indianapolis Racers
July 6, 1978	Jim Troy	Cincinnati Stingers
September 29, 1978	Mike Zuke	St. Louis Blues (NHL)
October 23, 1978	Ab DeMarco	Boston Bruins (NHL)
December 14, 1978	Rudolf Tajcnar	Released
March 1, 1979	Bryan Watson	Cincinnati Stingers

=== Signings ===
Date	Player	Term
June 2, 1978	Al Hamilton	3-year
June 13, 1978	Doug Berry	3-year
June 13, 1978	Blair MacDonald	4-year
June 15, 1978	Bill Flett	1-year
September 22, 1978	Larry Hendrick	
October 27, 1978	Garnet Bailey	
January 26, 1979	Wayne Gretzky	10-year

=== Waivers ===
Date	Player	Team
September 4, 1978	Steve Carlson	from New England Whalers
September 4, 1978	Jim Mayer	from New England Whalers

== See also ==
- 1978–79 WHA season
