= 1978–79 Winnipeg Jets season =

NHA hockey team season (last season in NHA)

1978–79 Winnipeg Jets
- Avco Cup champions
- Division: 3rd WHA
- 1978–79 record: 39–35–6
- Home record: 22–15–4
- Road record: 17–20–2
- Goals for: 307
- Goals against: 306

Team information
- General manager: John Ferguson
- Coach: Larry Hillman (28-27-6); Tom McVie (11-8-0)
- Captain: Barry Long
- Arena: Winnipeg Arena

Team leaders
- Goals: Morris Lukowich (65)
- Assists: Kent Nilsson (68)
- Points: Kent Nilsson (107)
- Penalty minutes: Scott Campbell (248)
- Wins: Markus Mattsson (25)
- Goals against average: Gary Smith (2.97)

The 1978–79 Winnipeg Jets season was the franchise's seventh and final season in the World Hockey Association. The WHA folded after the season.

== Regular season ==
Head coach Larry Hillman, who had guided the Jets to the AVCO Cup the previous season, was fired 61 games into the season. Three days later, Tom McVie took over and coached the remaining 19 games and guided the team to a 3rd-place finish in the league, which due to the league's dwindling fortunes meant that the top five teams of the remaining seven in the league (Indianapolis folded midway in the season) went into the playoffs. They finished one point ahead of the rival Whalers for third, which meant that the Jets got a first round bye as New England and Cincinnati played each other. The Jets played the 2nd place team, Quebec. After sweeping the Nordiques, they went to their fifth and final AVCO Cup Finals against the Oilers. Fittingly, the Jets won the Cup 4–2 and clinched the series at Winnipeg Arena 7–3 in Game 6 to end a seven-year run in which they appeared in five AVCO Cups and won three of them (1976, 1978, 1979) before the WHA merged with the NHL with the Jets included.

=== Final standings ===
Note: W = Wins, L = Losses, T = Ties, GF= Goals for, GA = Goals against, Pts = Points

WHA Team	GP	W	L	T	Pts	GF	GA	PIM
Edmonton Oilers	80	48	30	2	98	340	266	1220
Quebec Nordiques	80	41	34	5	87	288	271	1399
Winnipeg Jets	80	39	35	6	84	307	306	1342
New England Whalers	80	37	34	9	83	298	287	1090
Cincinnati Stingers	80	33	41	6	72	274	284	1651
Birmingham Bulls	80	32	42	6	70	286	311	1661
xIndianapolis Racers	25	5	18	2	12	78	130	557
#Soviet All-Stars	6	4	1	1	9	27	20	77
#Czechoslovakia	6	1	4	1	3	14	33	107
#Finland	1	0	1	0	0	4	8	2

x-team folded during season #-played limited schedule

== Schedule and results ==
1978–79 regular season
October: 4–3–2, 10 points (home: 1–2–2; road: 3–1–0)

Game	Result	Date	Score	Opponent	Record
1	W	October 13, 1978	5–4 OT	@ Birmingham Bulls (1978–79)	1–0–0
2	W	October 14, 1978	6–3	@ Indianapolis Racers (1978–79)	2–0–0
3	L	October 15, 1978	3–4	Cincinnati Stingers (1978–79)	2–1–0
4	T	October 18, 1978	4–4	New England Whalers (1978–79)	2–1–1
5	L	October 22, 1978	2–6	Edmonton Oilers (1978–79)	2–2–1
6	W	October 25, 1978	7–2	Birmingham Bulls (1978–79)	3–2–1
7	W	October 27, 1978	6–4	@ New England Whalers (1978–79)	4–2–1
8	L	October 28, 1978	2–3	@ Indianapolis Racers (1978–79)	4–3–1
9	T	October 29, 1978	3–3	Indianapolis Racers (1978–79)	4–3–2

November: 6–6–1, 12 points (home: 4–1–0; road: 2–5–1)

Game	Result	Date	Score	Opponent	Record
10	L	November 3, 1978	3–4 OT	@ Edmonton Oilers (1978–79)	4–4–2
11	W	November 5, 1978	6–2	Indianapolis Racers (1978–79)	5–4–2
12	W	November 7, 1978	2–1	@ Quebec Nordiques (1978–79)	6–4–2
13	L	November 9, 1978	5–6	@ Birmingham Bulls (1978–79)	6–5–2
14	L	November 10, 1978	2–3	@ Cincinnati Stingers (1978–79)	6–6–2
15	L	November 12, 1978	4–6	Quebec Nordiques (1978–79)	6–7–2
16	L	November 15, 1978	2–5	@ Quebec Nordiques (1978–79)	6–8–2
17	W	November 17, 1978	10–6	Cincinnati Stingers (1978–79)	7–8–2
18	W	November 19, 1978	5–2	Indianapolis Racers (1978–79)	8–8–2
19	L	November 22, 1978	2–5	@ New England Whalers (1978–79)	8–9–2
20	W	November 23, 1978	5–1	@ Indianapolis Racers (1978–79)	9–9–2
21	T	November 26, 1978	2–2	@ Quebec Nordiques (1978–79)	9–9–3
22	W	November 29, 1978	4–2	New England Whalers (1978–79)	10–9–3

December: 4–4–1, 9 points (home: 2–2–1; road: 2–2–0)

Game	Result	Date	Score	Opponent	Record
23	L	December 1, 1978	5–6	Cincinnati Stingers (1978–79)	10–10–3
24	L	December 3, 1978	3–5	@ Quebec Nordiques (1978–79)	10–11–3
25	W	December 7, 1978	9–4	@ Indianapolis Racers (1978–79)	11–11–3
26	T	December 10, 1978	4–4	Quebec Nordiques (1978–79)	11–11–4
27	L	December 14, 1978	3–4	Soviet All-Stars (1978–79)	11–12–4
28	W	December 17, 1978	6–3	Cincinnati Stingers (1978–79)	12–12–4
29	W	December 22, 1978	5–4	@ Edmonton Oilers (1978–79)	13–12–4
30	W	December 26, 1978	5–3	Edmonton Oilers (1978–79)	14–12–4
31	L	December 27, 1978	3–5	@ Edmonton Oilers (1978–79)	14–13–4

January: 8–6–2, 18 points (home: 4–2–1; road: 4–4–1)

Game	Result	Date	Score	Opponent	Record
32	T	January 1, 1979	3–3	Czechoslovakia (1978–79)	14–13–5
33	W	January 7, 1979	3–2	Quebec Nordiques (1978–79)	15–13–5
34	W	January 9, 1979	4–3 OT	Edmonton Oilers (1978–79)	16–13–5
35	W	January 12, 1979	3–1	@ Birmingham Bulls (1978–79)	17–13–5
36	W	January 13, 1979	3–1	@ Birmingham Bulls (1978–79)	18–13–5
37	W	January 14, 1979	4–2	@ New England Whalers (1978–79)	19–13–5
38	L	January 16, 1979	1–3	@ Edmonton Oilers (1978–79)	19–14–5
39	L	January 17, 1979	3–6	Edmonton Oilers (1978–79)	19–15–5
40	L	January 19, 1979	2–7	Cincinnati Stingers (1978–79)	19–16–5
41	L	January 20, 1979	1–10	@ Quebec Nordiques (1978–79)	19–17–5
42	W	January 21, 1979	3–1	Quebec Nordiques (1978–79)	20–17–5
43	T	January 24, 1979	5–5	@ Cincinnati Stingers (1978–79)	20–17–6
44	W	January 27, 1979	4–2	@ Quebec Nordiques (1978–79)	21–17–6
45	L	January 28, 1979	6–8	@ New England Whalers (1978–79)	21–18–6
46	L	January 30, 1979	2–5	@ New England Whalers (1978–79)	21–19–6
47	W	January 31, 1979	6–3	Edmonton Oilers (1978–79)	22–19–6

February: 6–8–0, 12 points (home: 4–2–0; road: 2–6–0)

Game	Result	Date	Score	Opponent	Record
48	W	February 2, 1979	4–2	Edmonton Oilers (1978–79)	23–19–6
49	W	February 4, 1979	8–1	Cincinnati Stingers (1978–79)	24–19–6
50	W	February 7, 1979	3–2	Birmingham Bulls (1978–79)	25–19–6
51	L	February 9, 1979	0–4	@ Cincinnati Stingers (1978–79)	25–20–6
52	L	February 10, 1979	2–7	@ New England Whalers (1978–79)	25–21–6
53	W	February 14, 1979	5–1	@ Cincinnati Stingers (1978–79)	26–21–6
54	L	February 16, 1979	1–2	@ Birmingham Bulls (1978–79)	26–22–6
55	L	February 17, 1979	4–6	@ Cincinnati Stingers (1978–79)	26–23–6
56	L	February 18, 1979	1–7	New England Whalers (1978–79)	26–24–6
57	L	February 20, 1979	2–5	@ Cincinnati Stingers (1978–79)	26–25–6
58	W	February 21, 1979	5–2	New England Whalers (1978–79)	27–25–6
59	L	February 23, 1979	1–9	@ Birmingham Bulls (1978–79)	27–26–6
60	W	February 25, 1979	7–5	@ New England Whalers (1978–79)	28–26–6
61	L	February 27, 1979	2–5	Birmingham Bulls (1978–79)	28–27–6

March: 6–5–0, 12 points (home: 4–4–0; road: 2–1–0)

Game	Result	Date	Score	Opponent	Record
62	L	March 2, 1979	1–4	New England Whalers (1978–79)	28–28–6
63	L	March 6, 1979	4–5	@ Birmingham Bulls (1978–79)	28–29–6
64	W	March 7, 1979	5–3	@ Cincinnati Stingers (1978–79)	29–29–6
65	W	March 11, 1979	7–2	Quebec Nordiques (1978–79)	30–29–6
66	L	March 14, 1979	2–4	Quebec Nordiques (1978–79)	30–30–6
67	W	March 16, 1979	5–3	Cincinnati Stingers (1978–79)	31–30–6
68	W	March 18, 1979	4–2	Birmingham Bulls (1978–79)	32–30–6
69	L	March 21, 1979	4–7	Edmonton Oilers (1978–79)	32–31–6
70	W	March 23, 1979	6–4	@ Edmonton Oilers (1978–79)	33–31–6
71	W	March 28, 1979	6–3	Cincinnati Stingers (1978–79)	34–31–6
72	L	March 30, 1979	0–2	Quebec Nordiques (1978–79)	34–32–6

April: 5–3–0, 10 points (home: 3–2–0; road: 2–1–0)

Game	Result	Date	Score	Opponent	Record
73	W	April 1, 1979	7–3	@ Quebec Nordiques (1978–79)	35–32–6
74	L	April 4, 1979	2–4	New England Whalers (1978–79)	35–33–6
75	L	April 6, 1979	1–2	Birmingham Bulls (1978–79)	35–34–6
76	W	April 8, 1979	6–4	New England Whalers (1978–79)	36–34–6
77	W	April 10, 1979	6–4	@ Edmonton Oilers (1978–79)	37–34–6
78	W	April 11, 1979	2–1	Birmingham Bulls (1978–79)	38–34–6
79	W	April 15, 1979	5–4 OT	Birmingham Bulls (1978–79)	39–34–6
80	L	April 18, 1979	3–9	@ Edmonton Oilers (1978–79)	39–35–6

Legend: Win (2 points) Loss (0 points) Tie (1 point)

== Playoffs ==
1979 Avco Cup playoffs
Semifinals vs. (2) Quebec Nordiques – Jets win 4–0

Game	Date	Visitor	Score	Home	Series
1	April 23	Winnipeg Jets	6–3	Quebec Nordiques	1-0
2	April 25	Winnipeg Jets	9–2	Quebec Nordiques	2-0
3	April 27	Quebec Nordiques	5–9	Winnipeg Jets	3-0
4	April 29	Quebec Nordiques	2–6	Winnipeg Jets	4-0

Avco Cup Finals vs. (1) Edmonton Oilers – Jets win 4–2

Game	Date	Visitor	Score	Home	Series
1	May 11	Winnipeg Jets	3–1	Edmonton Oilers	1-0
2	May 13	Winnipeg Jets	3–2	Edmonton Oilers	2-0
3	May 15	Edmonton Oilers	8–3	Winnipeg Jets	2-1
4	May 16	Edmonton Oilers	2–3	Winnipeg Jets	3-1
5	May 18	Winnipeg Jets	2–10	Edmonton Oilers	3-2
6	May 20	Edmonton Oilers	3–7	Winnipeg Jets	4-2

Legend: Win Loss

== Player statistics ==
=== Regular season ===
Scoring

Regular season
Player	Pos	GP	G	A	Pts	PIM	+/-	PPG	SHG
Kent Nilsson	C	78	39	68	107	8	1	8	0
Morris Lukowich	LW	80	65	34	99	119	26	16	0
Peter Sullivan	C	80	46	40	86	24	-6	9	2
Terry Ruskowski	C	75	20	66	86	211	13	6	1
Willy Lindstrom	RW	79	26	36	62	22	7	11	0
Rich Preston	RW	80	28	32	60	88	-5	6	1
Barry Long	D	80	5	36	41	42	-2	0	0
Bill Lesuk	LW	79	17	15	32	44	-14	0	0
Lyle Moffat	LW	70	14	18	32	38	-14	0	1
Bobby Guindon	LW	71	8	18	26	21	-12	0	0
John Gray	RW	57	10	15	25	51	-7	6	0
Paul Terbenche	D	68	3	22	25	12	-1	0	0
Mike Amodeo	D	64	4	18	22	29	-1	0	0
Scott Campbell	D	74	3	15	18	248	5	0	0
Paul MacKinnon	D	73	2	15	17	70	-3	0	0
Glenn Hicks	LW	69	6	10	16	48	-2	0	0
Roland Eriksson	C	33	5	10	15	2	-5	3	0
Steve West	C	18	3	11	14	6	6	1	0
Kim Clackson	D	71	0	12	12	210	-6	0	0
Bobby Hull	LW	4	2	3	5	0	1	1	0
Bill Davis	D	5	1	2	3	0	-2	0	0
Lars-Erik Sjoberg	D	9	0	3	3	2	-1	0	0
Gary Smith	G	11	0	3	3	2	0	0	0
Ted Green	D	20	0	2	2	16	-7	0	0
Joe Daley	G	23	0	1	1	2	0	0	0
John Gibson	D	9	0	1	1	5	1	0	0
Markus Mattsson	G	52	0	1	1	4	0	0	0
Rich Gosselin	C	3	0	0	0	0	-1	0	0
Dale Yakiwchuk	C	4	0	0	0	0	1	0	0

Goaltending

Player	MIN	GP	W	L	T	GA	GAA	SO
Markus Mattsson	2990	52	25	21	3	181	3.63	0
Joe Daley	1256	23	7	11	3	90	4.30	0
Gary Smith	626	11	7	3	0	31	2.97	0
Team:	4872	80	39	35	6	302	3.72	0

=== Playoffs ===
Scoring

Player	Pos	GP	G	A	Pts	PIM	GWG
Willy Lindstrom	RW	10	10	5	15	9	1
Morris Lukowich	LW	10	8	7	15	21	1
Peter Sullivan	C	10	5	9	14	2	1
Kent Nilsson	C	10	3	11	14	4	0
Rich Preston	RW	10	8	5	13	15	0
Terry Ruskowski	C	8	1	12	13	23	1
Paul MacKinnon	D	10	2	5	7	4	0
Barry Long	D	10	2	3	5	0	0
Steve West	C	6	2	3	5	2	0
Roland Eriksson	C	10	1	4	5	0	0
Kim Clackson	D	9	0	5	5	28	0
Lyle Moffat	LW	10	3	1	4	22	2
Bill Lesuk	LW	10	1	3	4	6	1
Bobby Guindon	LW	7	2	1	3	0	0
Lars-Erik Sjoberg	D	10	1	2	3	4	1
Glenn Hicks	LW	7	1	1	2	4	0
Paul Terbenche	D	10	1	1	2	4	0
Scott Campbell	D	10	0	2	2	25	0
Gary Smith	G	10	0	1	1	4	0
Joe Daley	G	3	0	0	0	0	0
John Gray	RW	1	0	0	0	0	0

Goaltending

Player	MIN	GP	W	L	GA	GAA	SO
Gary Smith	563	10	8	2	35	3.73	0
Joe Daley	37	3	0	0	3	4.86	0
Team:	600	10	8	2	38	3.80	0

Note:

Pos = Position;GP = Games played; G = Goals; A = Assists; Pts = Points; PIM = Penalty minutes; +/- = Plus/minus; PPG = Power-play goals; SHG = Short-handed goals; GWG = Game-winning goals
Pos = Position;GP = Games played; Min, TOI = Minutes played; W = Wins; L = Losses; T,T/OT = Ties; OTL = Overtime losses; GA = Goals-against; GAA = Goals-against average; SO = Shutouts; SA = Shots against; SV = Shots saved;SV% = Save percentage;

== See also ==
- 1978–79 WHA season
