= 1978–79 New England Whalers season =

World Hockey Association team season

1978–79 New England Whalers
- Division: 4th WHA
- 1978–79 record: 37–34–9
- Home record: 22–19–0
- Road record: 15–15–9
- Goals for: 298
- Goals against: 287

Team information
- General manager: Jack Kelley
- Coach: Bill Dineen (33–29–9); Don Blackburn (4–5–0)
- Captain: Rick Ley
- Arena: Springfield Civic Center

Team leaders
- Goals: Mark Howe (42)
- Assists: Mark Howe (65)
- Points: Mark Howe (107)
- Penalty minutes: Alan Hangsleben (148)
- Wins: John Garrett (20)
- Goals against average: Al Smith (3.31)

The 1978–79 New England Whalers season was the seventh season of the Whalers' franchise. This was the second of three seasons where the Whalers played at Springfield Civic Center. This was the final season in the World Hockey Association, which ceased operations after the season. The Whalers (along with the Winnipeg Jets, the Edmonton Oilers, and the Quebec Nordiques) were admitted to the National Hockey League as expansion teams. The Whalers (as part of the agreement suggested by the Boston Bruins) changed their name to the Hartford Whalers. The Whalers made the playoffs, with only five teams participating in the postseason. Don Blackburn took over the team as coach before the season ended, and he became the first coach of the team in the NHL.

== Regular season ==
=== Final standings ===
Note: W = Wins, L = Losses, T = Ties, GF= Goals for, GA = Goals against, Pts = Points

WHA Team	GP	W	L	T	Pts	GF	GA	PIM
Edmonton Oilers	80	48	30	2	98	340	266	1220
Quebec Nordiques	80	41	34	5	87	288	271	1399
Winnipeg Jets	80	39	35	6	84	307	306	1342
New England Whalers	80	37	34	9	83	298	287	1090
Cincinnati Stingers	80	33	41	6	72	274	284	1651
Birmingham Bulls	80	32	42	6	70	286	311	1661
xIndianapolis Racers	25	5	18	2	12	78	130	557
#Soviet All-Stars	6	4	1	1	9	27	20	77
#Czechoslovakia	6	1	4	1	3	14	33	107
#Finland	1	0	1	0	0	4	8	2

x-team folded during season #-played limited schedule

== Schedule and results ==
1978–79 regular season
October

Game	Result	Date	Score	Opponent	Record
1	W	October 15, 1978	6–5	@ Quebec Nordiques (1978–79)	1–0–0
2	W	October 17, 1978	2–1	@ Edmonton Oilers (1978–79)	2–0–0
3	T	October 18, 1978	4–4	@ Winnipeg Jets (1978–79)	2–0–1
4	W	October 21, 1978	7–1	Quebec Nordiques (1978–79)	3–0–1
5	W	October 22, 1978	6–3	@ Indianapolis Racers (1978–79)	4–0–1
6	W	October 24, 1978	2–1	@ Cincinnati Stingers (1978–79)	5–0–1
7	L	October 26, 1978	5–8	@ Quebec Nordiques (1978–79)	5–1–1
8	L	October 27, 1978	4–6	Winnipeg Jets (1978–79)	5–2–1
9	L	October 29, 1978	4–7	Cincinnati Stingers (1978–79)	5–3–1

November

Game	Result	Date	Score	Opponent	Record
10	W	November 3, 1978	6–3	Indianapolis Racers (1978–79)	6–3–1
11	T	November 4, 1978	6–6	@ Indianapolis Racers (1978–79)	6–3–2
12	L	November 5, 1978	4–5	@ Cincinnati Stingers (1978–79)	6–4–2
13	W	November 9, 1978	6–1	Edmonton Oilers (1978–79)	7–4–2
14	W	November 11, 1978	2–1	Cincinnati Stingers (1978–79)	8–4–2
15	T	November 14, 1978	5–5	@ Birmingham Bulls (1978–79)	8–4–3
16	T	November 15, 1978	4–4	@ Cincinnati Stingers (1978–79)	8–4–4
17	L	November 17, 1978	1–7	@ Birmingham Bulls (1978–79)	8–5–4
18	L	November 18, 1978	2–3	Birmingham Bulls (1978–79)	8–6–4
19	W	November 22, 1978	5–2	Winnipeg Jets (1978–79)	9–6–4
20	W	November 25, 1978	5–2	Birmingham Bulls (1978–79)	10–6–4
21	W	November 26, 1978	9–3	Birmingham Bulls (1978–79)	11–6–4
22	L	November 29, 1978	2–4	@ Winnipeg Jets (1978–79)	11–7–4

December

Game	Result	Date	Score	Opponent	Record
23	L	December 1, 1978	2–8	@ Edmonton Oilers (1978–79)	11–8–4
24	W	December 3, 1978	7–0	@ Edmonton Oilers (1978–79)	12–8–4
25	T	December 5, 1978	2–2	@ Cincinnati Stingers (1978–79)	12–8–5
26	W	December 7, 1978	5–3	Edmonton Oilers (1978–79)	13–8–5
27	L	December 9, 1978	4–7	Soviet All-Stars (1978–79)	13–9–5
28	W	December 12, 1978	7–4	@ Indianapolis Racers (1978–79)	14–9–5
29	W	December 16, 1978	2–1	Quebec Nordiques (1978–79)	15–9–5
30	T	December 17, 1978	4–4	@ Quebec Nordiques (1978–79)	15–9–6
31	W	December 23, 1978	4–3	Birmingham Bulls (1978–79)	16–9–6
32	W	December 27, 1978	10–4	Czechoslovakia (1978–79)	17–9–6
33	W	December 29, 1978	5–0	Birmingham Bulls (1978–79)	18–9–6
34	L	December 30, 1978	1–2	@ Cincinnati Stingers (1978–79)	18–10–6

January

Game	Result	Date	Score	Opponent	Record
35	W	January 7, 1979	5–4	Cincinnati Stingers (1978–79)	19–10–6
36	L	January 13, 1979	0–3	Edmonton Oilers (1978–79)	19–11–6
37	L	January 14, 1979	2–4	Winnipeg Jets (1978–79)	19–12–6
38	L	January 18, 1979	2–4	Quebec Nordiques (1978–79)	19–13–6
39	W	January 20, 1979	3–1	Cincinnati Stingers (1978–79)	20–13–6
40	L	January 23, 1979	1–5	@ Edmonton Oilers (1978–79)	20–14–6
41	L	January 26, 1979	4–5	@ Birmingham Bulls (1978–79)	20–15–6
42	W	January 28, 1979	8–6	Winnipeg Jets (1978–79)	21–15–6
43	W	January 30, 1979	5–2	Winnipeg Jets (1978–79)	22–15–6

February

Game	Result	Date	Score	Opponent	Record
44	W	February 2, 1979	4–1	Quebec Nordiques (1978–79)	23–15–6
45	T	February 3, 1979	2–2	@ Birmingham Bulls (1978–79)	23–15–7
46	W	February 6, 1979	5–3	@ Quebec Nordiques (1978–79)	24–15–7
47	W	February 10, 1979	7–2	Winnipeg Jets (1978–79)	25–15–7
48	L	February 11, 1979	2–5	@ Cincinnati Stingers (1978–79)	25–16–7
49	L	February 14, 1979	4–7	Birmingham Bulls (1978–79)	25–17–7
50	L	February 16, 1979	2–4	Edmonton Oilers (1978–79)	25–18–7
51	W	February 17, 1979	4–1	Quebec Nordiques (1978–79)	26–18–7
52	W	February 18, 1979	7–1	@ Winnipeg Jets (1978–79)	27–18–7
53	L	February 20, 1979	2–8	@ Edmonton Oilers (1978–79)	27–19–7
54	L	February 21, 1979	2–5	@ Winnipeg Jets (1978–79)	27–20–7
55	W	February 23, 1979	5–4 OT	Quebec Nordiques (1978–79)	28–20–7
56	L	February 24, 1979	0–6	@ Quebec Nordiques (1978–79)	28–21–7
57	L	February 25, 1979	5–7	Winnipeg Jets (1978–79)	28–22–7
58	T	February 27, 1979	1–1	@ Edmonton Oilers (1978–79)	28–22–8

March

Game	Result	Date	Score	Opponent	Record
59	W	March 2, 1979	4–1	@ Winnipeg Jets (1978–79)	29–22–8
60	L	March 4, 1979	3–4 OT	Cincinnati Stingers (1978–79)	29–23–8
61	L	March 9, 1979	1–3	Quebec Nordiques (1978–79)	29–24–8
62	W	March 11, 1979	2–1	@ Cincinnati Stingers (1978–79)	30–24–8
63	W	March 13, 1979	4–3	@ Birmingham Bulls (1978–79)	31–24–8
64	L	March 15, 1979	3–4 OT	Birmingham Bulls (1978–79)	31–25–8
65	T	March 16, 1979	5–5	@ Birmingham Bulls (1978–79)	31–25–9
66	L	March 18, 1979	1–4	Cincinnati Stingers (1978–79)	31–26–9
67	W	March 20, 1979	7–6 OT	@ Quebec Nordiques (1978–79)	32–26–9
68	W	March 23, 1979	5–3	Quebec Nordiques (1978–79)	33–26–9
69	L	March 24, 1979	3–4	Birmingham Bulls (1978–79)	33–27–9
70	L	March 27, 1979	1–3	@ Birmingham Bulls (1978–79)	33–28–9
71	L	March 30, 1979	1–3	Edmonton Oilers (1978–79)	33–29–9

April

Game	Result	Date	Score	Opponent	Record
72	L	April 1, 1979	3–5	Edmonton Oilers (1978–79)	33–30–9
73	W	April 4, 1979	4–2	@ Winnipeg Jets (1978–79)	34–30–9
74	L	April 6, 1979	2–7	@ Edmonton Oilers (1978–79)	34–31–9
75	L	April 8, 1979	4–6	@ Winnipeg Jets (1978–79)	34–32–9
76	W	April 10, 1979	5–2	@ Quebec Nordiques (1978–79)	35–32–9
77	W	April 12, 1979	4–0	Cincinnati Stingers (1978–79)	36–32–9
78	L	April 14, 1979	0–4	Cincinnati Stingers (1978–79)	36–33–9
79	L	April 15, 1979	1–4	Edmonton Oilers (1978–79)	36–34–9
80	W	April 17, 1979	3–2	@ Quebec Nordiques (1978–79)	37–34–9

Legend: Win (2 points) Loss (0 points) Tie (1 point)

== Playoffs ==
1979 Avco Cup playoffs
Preliminary Round vs. Cincinnati Stingers – Whalers win 3–0

Game	Date	Visitor	Score	Home	Series
1	April 21	Cincinnati Stingers	3 – 5	New England Whalers	1–0
2	April 22	New England Whalers	3 – 6	Cincinnati Stingers	1–1
3	April 24	New England Whalers	2 – 1	Cincinnati Stingers	2–1

Semifinals vs. Edmonton Oilers – Oilers win 4–3

Game	Date	Visitor	Score	Home	Series
1	April 26	New England Whalers	2 – 6	Edmonton Oilers	0–1
2	April 27	New England Whalers	5 – 9	Edmonton Oilers	0–2
3	April 29	Edmonton Oilers	1 – 4	New England Whalers	1–2
4	May 1	Edmonton Oilers	4 – 5	New England Whalers	2–2
5	May 3	New England Whalers	2 – 5	Edmonton Oilers	2–3
6	May 6	Edmonton Oilers	8 – 4	New England Whalers	3–3
7	May 8	New England Whalers	3 – 6	Edmonton Oilers	3–4

Legend: Win Loss

== Player statistics ==
=== Regular season ===
Scoring

Player	GP	G	A	Pts	PIM
Mark Howe	77	42	65	107	32
Andre Lacroix	78	32	56	88	34
Mike Rogers	80	27	45	72	31
Dave Keon	79	22	43	65	2
Gordie Roberts	79	11	46	57	113
Warren Miller	77	26	23	49	44
Mike Antonovich	69	20	27	47	35
John McKenzie	76	19	28	47	115
Gordie Howe	58	19	24	43	51
George Lyle	59	17	18	35	54
Alan Hangsleben	77	10	19	29	148
Rick Ley	73	7	20	27	135
Marty Howe	66	9	15	24	31
Ron Plumb	78	4	16	20	33
Jordy Douglas	51	6	10	16	15
Brad Selwood	42	4	12	16	47
Jim Warner	41	6	9	15	20
Blaine Stoughton	36	9	3	12	2
Larry Pleau	28	6	6	12	6
Jack Carlson	34	2	7	9	61
Dave Inkpen	41	0	7	7	15
Al Smith	40	0	3	3	35
Jeff Brubaker	12	0	0	0	19
John Garrett	41	0	0	0	6
Pierre Roy	1	0	0	0	2

Goaltending

Player	MIN	GP	W	L	T	GA	GAA	SA	SV	SV%	SO
John Garrett	2496	41	20	17	4	149	3.58	1180	1031	.874	2
Al Smith	2396	40	17	17	5	132	3.31	1124	992	.883	1
Team:	4892	80	37	34	9	281	3.45	2304	2023	.878	3

=== Playoffs ===
Scoring

Player	GP	G	A	Pts	PIM
Dave Keon	10	3	9	12	2
John McKenzie	10	3	7	10	10
Mike Antonovich	10	5	3	8	14
Andre Lacroix	10	4	4	8	0
George Lyle	9	3	5	8	25
Mike Rogers	10	2	6	8	2
Warren Miller	10	0	8	8	28
Blaine Stoughton	7	4	3	7	4
Mark Howe	6	4	2	6	6
Jordy Douglas	10	4	0	4	23
Gordie Howe	10	3	1	4	4
Ron Plumb	9	1	3	4	0
Rick Ley	9	0	4	4	11
Gordie Roberts	10	0	4	4	10
Larry Pleau	10	2	1	3	0
Al Hangsleben	10	1	2	3	12
Marty Howe	9	0	1	1	8
Dave Inkpen	5	0	1	1	4
Jeff Brubaker	3	0	0	0	12
John Garrett	8	0	0	0	0
Al Smith	4	0	0	0	0
Jim Warner	1	0	0	0	0

Goaltending

Player	MIN	GP	W	L	T	GA	GAA	SA	SV	SV%	SO
John Garrett	447	8	4	3		32	4.30				0
Al Smith	153	4	1	2		12	4.71				0
Team:	600	10	5	5		44	4.40				0

== See also ==
- 1978–79 WHA season
