= 1978–79 Quebec Nordiques season =

World Hockey Association team season

1978–79 Quebec Nordiques
- Division: 2nd WHA
- 1978–79 record: 41–34–5
- Home record: 24–13–4
- Road record: 17–21–1
- Goals for: 288
- Goals against: 271

Team information
- General manager: Maurice Filion
- Coach: Jacques Demers
- Captain: Marc Tardif
- Alternate captains: Serge Bernier; Real Cloutier; Bob Fitchner
- Arena: Colisée de Québec

Team leaders
- Goals: Real Cloutier (75)
- Assists: Marc Tardif (55)
- Points: Real Cloutier (129)
- Penalty minutes: Paul Baxter (240)
- Plus/minus: Marc Tardif (+25)
- Wins: Richard Brodeur (25)
- Goals against average: Richard Brodeur (3.11)

The 1978–79 Quebec Nordiques season was the Nordiques' seventh season in the WHA, were coming off of a 40–37–3 record in the 1977–78 season and a loss in the playoff semi-finals. The Nordiques improved to 41–34–5 to qualify for the playoffs, but lost in the first round to eventual Avco Cup champions Winnipeg Jets.

After the season was finished, the WHA announced that four of its teams, the Nordiques, Edmonton Oilers, New England Whalers and Winnipeg Jets would be admitted to the National Hockey League as expansion teams for the 1979–80 NHL season, and that the WHA would cease operations. During their seven seasons in the WHA, Quebec had a record of 295–237–24, while winning the 1977 Avco Cup.

== Off-season ==
During the off-season, the league would lose the Houston Aeros, as they elected to fold as the club was not part of an NHL-WHA merger, leaving the WHA with seven teams. The league also announced that games against all-star teams from the Soviet Union, Czechoslovakia and Finland would once again count in the standings. The Nordiques would hire a new head coach, as Jacques Demers would take over from Maurice Filion, who ended the previous season as the interim head coach. Demers had previously coached the Indianapolis Racers and Cincinnati Stingers.

== Regular season ==
The Nordiques would start the season slowly, going winless in their opening five games, however, the team snapped out of their slump, winning ten of their next thirteen games to push themselves over the .500 mark. Quebec would stay consistent throughout the season, easily clinching a playoff berth, as the Nordiques would finish the season with a 41-34-5 record, finishing second in the league behind the Edmonton Oilers, who had eleven more points than Quebec.

Offensively, Quebec was led by Real Cloutier, who won the Bill Hunter Trophy by earning a league high 129 points. It was the fourth year in a row that a player from the Nordiques (Marc Tardif in 1976 and 1978, and Cloutier in 1977) would win that award. Cloutier scored a team record 75 goals, and added 54 assists. Marc Tardif had another solid season, scoring 41 goals and 96 points, while Serge Bernier added 36 goals and 82 points. Rich Leduc joined the 30 goal club, as he registered 30 goals and 62 points. On defence, Paul Baxter led the way, scoring 10 goals and 46 points, as well as a team high 240 PIM. Forty-year-old J. C. Tremblay had a productive year, earning 44 points in 56 games.

In goal, Richard Brodeur and Jim Corsi split the action, with Brodeur winning a team high 25 games, as well as a club best 3.11 GAA. Corsi had 16 victories and a 3.30 GAA, while both goaltenders earned three shutouts.

=== Season standings ===
Note: W = Wins, L = Losses, T = Ties, GF= Goals for, GA = Goals against, Pts = Points

| WHA Team | GP | W | L | T | Pts | GF | GA | PIM |
|---|---|---|---|---|---|---|---|---|
| Edmonton Oilers | 80 | 48 | 30 | 2 | 98 | 340 | 266 | 1220 |
| Quebec Nordiques | 80 | 41 | 34 | 5 | 87 | 288 | 271 | 1399 |
| Winnipeg Jets | 80 | 39 | 35 | 6 | 84 | 307 | 306 | 1342 |
| New England Whalers | 80 | 37 | 34 | 9 | 83 | 298 | 287 | 1090 |
| Cincinnati Stingers | 80 | 33 | 41 | 6 | 72 | 274 | 284 | 1651 |
| Birmingham Bulls | 80 | 32 | 42 | 6 | 70 | 286 | 311 | 1661 |
| xIndianapolis Racers | 25 | 5 | 18 | 2 | 12 | 78 | 130 | 557 |
| #Soviet All-Stars | 6 | 4 | 1 | 1 | 9 | 27 | 20 | 77 |
| #Czechoslovakia | 6 | 1 | 4 | 1 | 3 | 14 | 33 | 107 |
| #Finland | 1 | 0 | 1 | 0 | 0 | 4 | 8 | 2 |

x-team folded during season #-played limited schedule

== Schedule and results ==
1978–79 regular season
October

| Game | Date | Visitor | Score | Home | Record | Points |
|---|---|---|---|---|---|---|
| 1 | October 15 | New England Whalers | 6–5 | Quebec Nordiques | 0–1–0 | 0 |
| 2 | October 17 | Cincinnati Stingers | 5–5 | Quebec Nordiques | 0–1–1 | 1 |
| 3 | October 18 | Indianapolis Racers | 4–0 | Quebec Nordiques | 0–2–1 | 1 |
| 4 | October 21 | Quebec Nordiques | 1–7 | New England Whalers | 0–3–1 | 1 |
| 5 | October 22 | Birmingham Bulls | 8–5 | Quebec Nordiques | 0–4–1 | 1 |
| 6 | October 25 | Cincinnati Stingers | 3–4 | Quebec Nordiques | 1–4–1 | 3 |
| 7 | October 26 | New England Whalers | 5–8 | Quebec Nordiques | 2–4–1 | 5 |
| 8 | October 28 | Quebec Nordiques | 3–4 | Cincinnati Stingers | 2–5–1 | 5 |
| 9 | October 29 | Quebec Nordiques | 6–2 | Edmonton Oilers | 3–5–1 | 7 |
| 10 | October 31 | Quebec Nordiques | 5–4 | Edmonton Oilers | 4–5–1 | 9 |

November

| Game | Date | Visitor | Score | Home | Record | Points |
|---|---|---|---|---|---|---|
| 11 | November 3 | Quebec Nordiques | 3–2 | Birmingham Bulls | 5–5–1 | 11 |
| 12 | November 4 | Quebec Nordiques | 3–1 | Birmingham Bulls | 6–5–1 | 13 |
| 13 | November 5 | Edmonton Oilers | 0–2 | Quebec Nordiques | 7–5–1 | 15 |
| 14 | November 7 | Winnipeg Jets | 2–1 | Quebec Nordiques | 7–6–1 | 15 |
| 15 | November 8 | Edmonton Oilers | 6–5 | Quebec Nordiques | 7–7–1 | 15 |
| 16 | November 11 | Indianapolis Racers | 2–8 | Quebec Nordiques | 8–7–1 | 17 |
| 17 | November 12 | Quebec Nordiques | 6–4 | Winnipeg Jets | 9–7–1 | 19 |
| 18 | November 15 | Winnipeg Jets | 2–5 | Quebec Nordiques | 10–7–1 | 21 |
| 19 | November 21 | Quebec Nordiques | 1–4 | Edmonton Oilers | 10–8–1 | 21 |
| 20 | November 24 | Quebec Nordiques | 3–4 | Edmonton Oilers | 10–9–1 | 21 |
| 21 | November 26 | Winnipeg Jets | 2–2 | Quebec Nordiques | 10–9–2 | 22 |
| 22 | November 29 | Birmingham Bulls | 4–7 | Quebec Nordiques | 11–9–2 | 24 |

December

| Game | Date | Visitor | Score | Home | Record | Points |
|---|---|---|---|---|---|---|
| 23 | December 2 | Cincinnati Stingers | 0–2 | Quebec Nordiques | 12–9–2 | 26 |
| 24 | December 3 | Winnipeg Jets | 3–5 | Quebec Nordiques | 13–9–2 | 28 |
| 25 | December 6 | Edmonton Oilers | 3–6 | Quebec Nordiques | 14–9–2 | 30 |
| 26 | December 9 | Cincinnati Stingers | 3–4 | Quebec Nordiques | 15–9–2 | 32 |
| 27 | December 10 | Quebec Nordiques | 4–4 | Winnipeg Jets | 15–9–3 | 33 |
| 28 | December 12 | Soviet All-Stars | 6–3 | Quebec Nordiques | 15–10–3 | 33 |
| 29 | December 14 | Birmingham Bulls | 2–3 | Quebec Nordiques | 16–10–3 | 35 |
| 30 | December 16 | Quebec Nordiques | 1–2 | New England Whalers | 16–11–3 | 35 |
| 31 | December 17 | New England Whalers | 4–4 | Quebec Nordiques | 16–11–4 | 36 |
| 32 | December 22 | Quebec Nordiques | 5–1 | Birmingham Bulls | 17–11–4 | 38 |
| 33 | December 23 | Quebec Nordiques | 2–6 | Cincinnati Stingers | 17–12–4 | 38 |
| 34 | December 28 | Czechoslovak All-Stars | 0–4 | Quebec Nordiques | 18–12–4 | 40 |
| 35 | December 30 | Birmingham Bulls | 2–3 | Quebec Nordiques | 19–12–4 | 42 |

January

| Game | Date | Visitor | Score | Home | Record | Points |
|---|---|---|---|---|---|---|
| 36 | January 7 | Quebec Nordiques | 2–3 | Winnipeg Jets | 19–13–4 | 42 |
| 37 | January 9 | Quebec Nordiques | 4–3 | Cincinnati Stingers | 20–13–4 | 44 |
| 38 | January 12 | Quebec Nordiques | 2–1 | Cincinnati Stingers | 21–13–4 | 46 |
| 39 | January 18 | Quebec Nordiques | 4–2 | New England Whalers | 22–13–4 | 48 |
| 40 | January 20 | Winnipeg Jets | 1–10 | Quebec Nordiques | 23–13–4 | 50 |
| 41 | January 21 | Quebec Nordiques | 1–3 | Winnipeg Jets | 23–14–4 | 50 |
| 42 | January 23 | Quebec Nordiques | 7–5 | Birmingham Bulls | 24–14–4 | 52 |
| 43 | January 27 | Winnipeg Jets | 4–2 | Quebec Nordiques | 24–15–4 | 52 |
| 44 | January 30 | Quebec Nordiques | 1–2 | Birmingham Bulls | 24–16–4 | 52 |

February

| Game | Date | Visitor | Score | Home | Record | Points |
|---|---|---|---|---|---|---|
| 45 | February 1 | Quebec Nordiques | 5–7 | Birmingham Bulls | 24–17–4 | 52 |
| 46 | February 2 | Quebec Nordiques | 1–4 | New England Whalers | 24-18–4 | 52 |
| 47 | February 4 | Edmonton Oilers | 3–6 | Quebec Nordiques | 25–18–4 | 54 |
| 48 | February 6 | New England Whalers | 5–3 | Quebec Nordiques | 25–19–4 | 54 |
| 49 | February 9 | Quebec Nordiques | 0–3 | Edmonton Oilers | 25–20–4 | 54 |
| 50 | February 13 | Quebec Nordiques | 1–6 | Edmonton Oilers | 25–21–4 | 54 |
| 51 | February 17 | Quebec Nordiques | 1–4 | New England Whalers | 25–22–4 | 54 |
| 52 | February 18 | Quebec Nordiques | 4–2 | Cincinnati Stingers | 26–22–4 | 56 |
| 53 | February 20 | Quebec Nordiques | 7–3 | Birmingham Bulls | 27–22–4 | 58 |
| 54 | February 23 | Quebec Nordiques | 4–5 | New England Whalers | 27–23–4 | 58 |
| 55 | February 24 | New England Whalers | 0–6 | Quebec Nordiques | 28–23–4 | 60 |
| 56 | February 25 | Cincinnati Stingers | 1–1 | Quebec Nordiques | 28–23–5 | 61 |

March

| Game | Date | Visitor | Score | Home | Record | Points |
|---|---|---|---|---|---|---|
| 57 | March 3 | Birmingham Bulls | 2–3 | Quebec Nordiques | 29–23–5 | 63 |
| 58 | March 4 | Birmingham Bulls | 4–5 | Quebec Nordiques | 30–23–5 | 65 |
| 59 | March 6 | Edmonton Oilers | 3–4 | Quebec Nordiques | 31–23–5 | 67 |
| 60 | March 7 | Edmonton Oilers | 3–6 | Quebec Nordiques | 32–23–5 | 69 |
| 61 | March 9 | Quebec Nordiques | 3–1 | New England Whalers | 33–23–5 | 71 |
| 62 | March 10 | Quebec Nordiques | 2–5 | Cincinnati Stingers | 33–24–5 | 71 |
| 63 | March 11 | Quebec Nordiques | 2–7 | Winnipeg Jets | 33–25–5 | 71 |
| 64 | March 14 | Quebec Nordiques | 4-2 | Winnipeg Jets | 34–25–5 | 73 |
| 65 | March 16 | Quebec Nordiques | 1–6 | Edmonton Oilers | 34–26–5 | 73 |
| 66 | March 18 | Quebec Nordiques | 7–2 | Edmonton Oilers | 35–26-5 | 75 |
| 67 | March 20 | New England Whalers | 7–6 | Quebec Nordiques | 35–27–5 | 75 |
| 68 | March 23 | Quebec Nordiques | 3–5 | New England Whalers | 35–28–5 | 75 |
| 69 | March 24 | Quebec Nordiques | 5–2 | Cincinnati Stingers | 36–28–5 | 77 |
| 70 | March 25 | Birmingham Bulls | 2–3 | Quebec Nordiques | 37–28–5 | 79 |
| 71 | March 28 | Edmonton Oilers | 0-3 | Quebec Nordiques | 38–28–5 | 81 |
| 72 | March 30 | Quebec Nordiques | 2–0 | Winnipeg Jets | 39–28–5 | 83 |

April

| Game | Date | Visitor | Score | Home | Record | Points |
|---|---|---|---|---|---|---|
| 73 | April 1 | Winnipeg Jets | 7–3 | Quebec Nordiques | 39–29–5 | 83 |
| 74 | April 3 | Quebec Nordiques | 3–5 | Birmingham Bulls | 39–30–5 | 83 |
| 75 | April 4 | Edmonton Oilers | 2–4 | Quebec Nordiques | 40–30–5 | 85 |
| 76 | April 7 | Quebec Nordiques | 2–6 | Cincinnati Stingers | 40–31–5 | 85 |
| 77 | April 10 | New England Whalers | 5–2 | Quebec Nordiques | 40–32–5 | 85 |
| 78 | April 11 | Cincinnati Stingers | 6–2 | Quebec Nordiques | 40–33–5 | 85 |
| 79 | April 15 | Cincinnati Stingers | 2–4 | Quebec Nordiques | 41–33–5 | 87 |
| 80 | April 17 | New England Whalers | 6–2 | Quebec Nordiques | 41–34–5 | 87 |

Legend: Win (2 points) Loss (0 points) Tie (1 point)

== Playoffs ==
In the opening round of the playoffs, Quebec would face the Winnipeg Jets in a best of seven semi-final series. The Jets finished the season with a 39-35-6 record, earning 84 points, and a third-place finish. The series opened with two games in Quebec, however, the Jets struck first, easily dominating the Nordiques in the series opener, by winning the game 6-3, before crushing Quebec in the second game 9-2 to take a two-game series lead. The series moved to Winnipeg for the next two games, and the Jets would stay hot, as they continued to dominate the Nordiques in the third and fourth games of the series, winning them 9-5 and 6-2 respectively to sweep Quebec out of the playoffs.

1979 Avco Cup playoffs
Semifinals vs. (3) Winnipeg Jets – Jets win 4–0

| Game | Date | Visitor | Score | Home | Series |
|---|---|---|---|---|---|
| 1 | April 23 | Winnipeg Jets | 6–3 | Quebec Nordiques | 0–1 |
| 2 | April 25 | Winnipeg Jets | 9–2 | Quebec Nordiques | 0–2 |
| 3 | April 27 | Quebec Nordiques | 5–9 | Winnipeg Jets | 0–3 |
| 4 | April 29 | Quebec Nordiques | 2–6 | Winnipeg Jets | 0–4 |

Legend: Win Loss

== Player statistics ==
=== Players ===
Regular season
| Player | Position | GP | G | A | Pts | PIM | +/- | PPG | SHG | GWG |
|---|---|---|---|---|---|---|---|---|---|---|
| Real Cloutier | RW | 77 | 75 | 54 | 129 | 48 | 23 | 21 | 0 | 0 |
| Marc Tardif | LW | 74 | 41 | 55 | 96 | 98 | 25 | 12 | 0 | 0 |
| Serge Bernier | RW | 65 | 36 | 46 | 82 | 71 | 7 | 9 | 3 | 0 |
| Rich LeDuc | C | 61 | 30 | 32 | 62 | 30 | -1 | 12 | 1 | 0 |
| Paul Baxter | D | 76 | 10 | 36 | 46 | 240 | -5 | 6 | 0 | 0 |
| Bob Fitchner | C | 79 | 10 | 35 | 45 | 69 | -3 | 1 | 0 | 0 |
| J. C. Tremblay | D | 56 | 6 | 38 | 44 | 8 | 10 | 0 | 0 | 0 |
| Garry Lariviere | D | 50 | 5 | 33 | 38 | 54 | -11 | 1 | 0 | 0 |
| Paulin Bordeleau | RW | 77 | 17 | 12 | 29 | 44 | 1 | 2 | 1 | 0 |
| Alain Cote | LW | 79 | 14 | 13 | 27 | 23 | -7 | 0 | 1 | 0 |
| Curt Brackenbury | RW | 70 | 13 | 13 | 26 | 155 | -5 | 1 | 0 | 0 |
| Danny Geoffrion | RW | 77 | 12 | 14 | 26 | 74 | -2 | 0 | 0 | 0 |
| Francois Lacombe | D | 78 | 3 | 21 | 24 | 44 | 4 | 0 | 0 | 0 |
| Dale Hoganson | D | 69 | 2 | 19 | 21 | 17 | 1 | 1 | 0 | 0 |
| Christian Bordeleau | C | 16 | 5 | 12 | 17 | 0 | 6 | 0 | 0 | 0 |
| Norm Dube | LW | 36 | 2 | 13 | 15 | 4 | 6 | 0 | 0 | 0 |
| Gilles Bilodeau | LW | 36 | 3 | 6 | 9 | 141 | 2 | 0 | 0 | 0 |
| Wally Weir | D | 68 | 2 | 7 | 9 | 166 | 9 | 0 | 0 | 0 |
| Kevin Morrison | D | 27 | 2 | 5 | 7 | 14 | -2 | 1 | 0 | 0 |
| Richard David | LW | 14 | 0 | 4 | 4 | 4 | 3 | 0 | 0 | 0 |
| Richard Brodeur | G | 42 | 0 | 3 | 3 | 2 | 0 | 0 | 0 | 0 |
| Jim Corsi | G | 40 | 0 | 2 | 2 | 20 | 0 | 0 | 0 | 0 |
| Jim Dorey | D | 32 | 0 | 2 | 2 | 17 | -5 | 0 | 0 | 0 |
| Pierre Lagace | LW | 21 | 0 | 1 | 1 | 12 | 0 | 0 | 0 | 0 |
| Kevin Devine | LW | 5 | 0 | 0 | 0 | 6 | -3 | 0 | 0 | 0 |
| Rene Leclerc | RW | 23 | 0 | 0 | 0 | 8 | -2 | 0 | 0 | 0 |
| Jean-Louis Levasseur | G | 3 | 0 | 0 | 0 | 0 | 0 | 0 | 0 | 0 |

Avco Cup playoffs
| Player | Position | GP | G | A | Pts | PIM | PPG | SHG | GWG |
|---|---|---|---|---|---|---|---|---|---|
| Marc Tardif | LW | 4 | 6 | 2 | 8 | 4 | 0 | 0 | 0 |
| Real Cloutier | RW | 4 | 2 | 2 | 4 | 2 | 0 | 0 | 0 |
| Bob Fitchner | C | 4 | 1 | 3 | 4 | 0 | 0 | 0 | 0 |
| Danny Geoffrion | RW | 4 | 1 | 2 | 3 | 2 | 0 | 0 | 0 |
| Curt Brackenbury | RW | 4 | 1 | 1 | 2 | 2 | 0 | 0 | 0 |
| Paul Baxter | D | 4 | 0 | 2 | 2 | 7 | 0 | 0 | 0 |
| Rich LeDuc | C | 4 | 0 | 2 | 2 | 0 | 0 | 0 | 0 |
| Paulin Bordeleau | RW | 4 | 1 | 0 | 1 | 0 | 0 | 0 | 0 |
| Francois Lacombe | D | 4 | 0 | 1 | 1 | 7 | 0 | 0 | 0 |
| Pierre Lagace | LW | 3 | 0 | 1 | 1 | 2 | 0 | 0 | 0 |
| Garry Lariviere | D | 4 | 0 | 1 | 1 | 2 | 0 | 0 | 0 |
| Wally Weir | D | 4 | 0 | 1 | 1 | 4 | 0 | 0 | 0 |
| Serge Bernier | RW | 1 | 0 | 0 | 0 | 2 | 0 | 0 | 0 |
| Gilles Bilodeau | LW | 3 | 0 | 0 | 0 | 25 | 0 | 0 | 0 |
| Richard Brodeur | G | 3 | 0 | 0 | 0 | 0 | 0 | 0 | 0 |
| Jim Corsi | G | 2 | 0 | 0 | 0 | 2 | 0 | 0 | 0 |
| Alain Cote | LW | 4 | 0 | 0 | 0 | 2 | 0 | 0 | 0 |
| Jim Dorey | D | 3 | 0 | 0 | 0 | 0 | 0 | 0 | 0 |
| Dale Hoganson | D | 4 | 0 | 0 | 0 | 2 | 0 | 0 | 0 |
| Rene Leclerc | RW | 4 | 0 | 0 | 0 | 0 | 0 | 0 | 0 |
| Jean-Louis Levasseur | G | 1 | 0 | 0 | 0 | 2 | 0 | 0 | 0 |

=== Goaltending ===
Regular season
| Player | MIN | GP | W | L | T | GA | GAA | SO |
|---|---|---|---|---|---|---|---|---|
| Richard Brodeur | 2433 | 42 | 25 | 13 | 3 | 126 | 3.11 | 3 |
| Jim Corsi | 2291 | 40 | 16 | 20 | 1 | 126 | 3.30 | 3 |
| Jean-Louis Levasseur | 140 | 3 | 0 | 1 | 1 | 14 | 6.00 | 0 |
| Team: | 4864 | 80 | 41 | 34 | 5 | 266 | 3.28 | 6 |

Avco Cup playoffs
| Player | MIN | GP | W | L | GA | GAA | SO |
|---|---|---|---|---|---|---|---|
| Richard Brodeur | 114 | 3 | 0 | 2 | 14 | 7.37 | 0 |
| Jim Corsi | 66 | 2 | 0 | 1 | 7 | 6.36 | 0 |
| Jean-Louis Levasseur | 59 | 1 | 0 | 1 | 8 | 8.14 | 0 |
| Team: | 239 | 4 | 0 | 4 | 29 | 7.28 | 0 |

Note:

Pos = Position;GP = Games played; G = Goals; A = Assists; Pts = Points; PIM = Penalty minutes; +/- = Plus/minus; PPG = Power-play goals; SHG = Short-handed goals; GWG = Game-winning goals
Pos = Position;GP = Games played; Min, TOI = Minutes played; W = Wins; L = Losses; T,T/OT = Ties; OTL = Overtime losses; GA = Goals-against; GAA = Goals-against average; SO = Shutouts; SA = Shots against; SV = Shots saved;SV% = Save percentage;

== See also ==
- 1978–79 WHA season
