= Blaine Stoughton =

Canadian ice hockey player

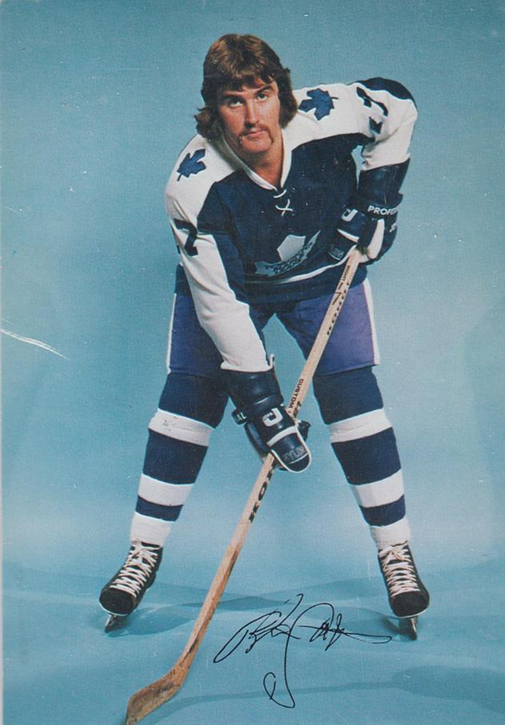
- 1975 postcard of Stoughton
- Born: March 13, 1953 (age 73) Gilbert Plains, Manitoba, Canada
- Height: 5 ft 11 in (180 cm)
- Weight: 185 lb (84 kg; 13 st 3 lb)
- Position: Right wing
- Shot: Right
- Played for: Pittsburgh Penguins; Toronto Maple Leafs; Cincinnati Stingers; Indianapolis Racers; New England / Hartford Whalers; New York Rangers; HC Asiago
- NHL draft: 7th overall, 1973; Pittsburgh Penguins
- WHA draft: 14th overall, 1973; Quebec Nordiques
- Playing career: 1973–1988

Blaine A. Stoughton (born March 13, 1953) is a Canadian former professional ice hockey forward who played twelve professional seasons. Stoughton played nine seasons in the National Hockey League (NHL) for the Pittsburgh Penguins, Toronto Maple Leafs, Hartford Whalers and New York Rangers, which bookended three seasons in the World Hockey Association (WHA) split among the Cincinnati Stingers, Indianapolis Racers and New England Whalers.

== Playing career ==
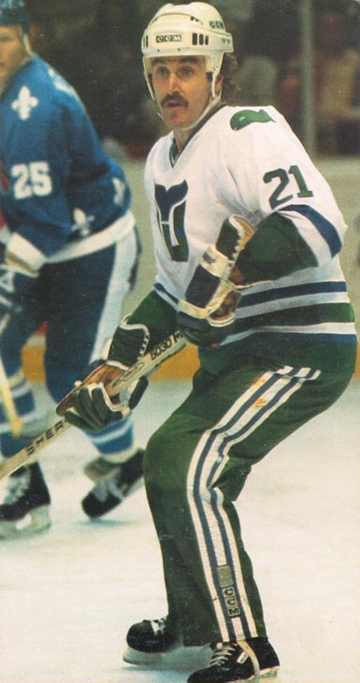
Stoughton with Hartford Whalers in 1982–83 season

Stoughton played his major junior career with the Flin Flon Bombers, and was drafted seventh overall by the Penguins in the 1973 NHL Amateur Draft. Stoughton had an up-and-down stint in the WHA. Often teamed with Rick Dudley and Rich LeDuc on the "LSD" line, Stoughton scored 52 goals for the Cincinnati Stingers in 1976–77. The next year he was traded to the Indianapolis Racers by mid-season. When the Racers folded in 1978, he was signed by the New England Whalers, where he played on the third line with Mike Rogers, scoring 19 goals. Stoughton scored at least 50 goals in a season in the NHL twice, at least 40 goals four times, and tied for the league lead with 56 in 1979–80, a franchise record that still stands.

The final season for Stoughton was In the 1983–84 season, Stoughton was traded to the New York Rangers, where he played what ended up as his final 14 games in the league (in 68 total games, he had 28 goals). He played the 1984–85 season in the AHL and one more season of 15 games with HC Asiago in Italy.

== Post-playing career ==
Stoughton was an assistant coach for the Cincinnati Cyclones (IHL) in the league's first year and during the last two years in the ECHL. In 1996 he and former teammate Paul Lawless started the Austin Ice Bats franchise. Stoughton was owner and General Manager for three seasons.

== Awards and achievements ==
- Turnbull Cup (MJHL championship) (1969)
- WCHL First All-Star Team (1972)
- WCHL goal scoring leader (1972)
- NHL goal scoring leader (1980)
- Played in the 1982 NHL All-Star Game
- Member of the Manitoba Hockey Hall of Fame

== Career statistics ==
			Regular season					Playoffs
Season	Team	League	GP	G	A	Pts	PIM	GP	G	A	Pts	PIM
1968–69	Dauphin Kings	MJHL	33	15	19	34	100	—	—	—	—	—
1968–69	Dauphin Kings	MC	—	—	—	—	—	1	0	0	0	7
1969–70	Flin Flon Bombers	WCHL	59	19	20	39	181	17	4	2	6	29
1970–71	Flin Flon Bombers	WCHL	35	26	24	50	96	17	13	13	26	61
1971–72	Flin Flon Bombers	WCHL	68	60	66	126	121	7	4	6	10	27
1972–73	Flin Flon Bombers	WCHL	66	58	60	118	86	9	9	5	14	18
1973–74	Pittsburgh Penguins	NHL	34	5	6	11	8	—	—	—	—	—
1973–74	Hershey Bears	AHL	47	23	17	40	35	—	—	—	—	—
1974–75	Toronto Maple Leafs	NHL	78	23	14	37	24	7	4	2	6	2
1975–76	Oklahoma City Blazers	CHL	30	14	22	36	24	4	0	0	0	2
1975–76	Toronto Maple Leafs	NHL	43	6	11	17	8	—	—	—	—	—
1976–77	Cincinnati Stingers	WHA	81	52	52	104	39	4	0	3	3	2
1977–78	Cincinnati Stingers	WHA	30	6	13	19	36	—	—	—	—	—
1977–78	Indianapolis Racers	WHA	47	13	13	26	28	—	—	—	—	—
1978–79	Indianapolis Racers	WHA	25	9	9	18	16	—	—	—	—	—
1978–79	New England Whalers	WHA	36	9	3	12	2	7	4	3	7	4
1979–80	Hartford Whalers	NHL	80	56	44	100	16	1	0	0	0	0
1980–81	Hartford Whalers	NHL	71	43	30	73	56	—	—	—	—	—
1981–82	Hartford Whalers	NHL	80	52	39	91	57	—	—	—	—	—
1982–83	Hartford Whalers	NHL	72	45	31	76	27	—	—	—	—	—
1983–84	Hartford Whalers	NHL	54	23	14	37	4	—	—	—	—	—
1983–84	New York Rangers	NHL	14	5	2	7	4	—	—	—	—	—
1984–85	New Haven Nighthawks	AHL	60	25	25	45	35	—	—	—	—	—
1987–88	HC Asiago	Serie A	15	10	16	26	2	—	—	—	—	—
NHL totals			526	258	191	449	204	8	4	2	6	2
WHA totals			219	89	90	179	121	11	4	6	10	6

== See also ==
- List of NHL players with 100-point seasons

Preceded by Greg Polis	Pittsburgh Penguins first-round draft pick 1973	Succeeded by Pierre Larouche
Preceded by Mike Bossy	NHL Goal Leader; 1980 (tied with Danny Gare and Charlie Simmer)	Succeeded by Mike Bossy
