= 1978–79 Cincinnati Stingers season =

World Hockey Association team season

1978–79 Cincinnati Stingers
- League: 5th WHA
- 1978–79 record: 33–41–6
- Home record: 21–16–4
- Road record: 12–25–2
- Goals for: 274
- Goals against: 284

Team information
- Coach: Floyd Smith
- Captain: Rick Dudley
- Alternate captains: Robbie Ftorek; Peter Marsh
- Arena: Riverfront Coliseum

Team leaders
- Goals: Peter Marsh (43)
- Assists: Robbie Ftorek (77)
- Points: Robbie Ftorek (116)
- Penalty minutes: Barry Melrose (222)
- Wins: Mike Liut (23)
- Goals against average: Michel Dion (3.32)

The 1978–79 Cincinnati Stingers season was the Stingers' last season of operation in the World Hockey Association. They finished 5th and lost in the first round to the New England Whalers. They were the only team from this season's playoffs not brought into the National Hockey League as part of the NHL–WHA merger; however, this had been decided ahead of the playoffs.

== Regular season ==
=== Final standings ===
Note: W = Wins, L = Losses, T = Ties, GF= Goals for, GA = Goals against, Pts = Points

WHA Team	GP	W	L	T	Pts	GF	GA	PIM
Edmonton Oilers	80	48	30	2	98	340	266	1220
Quebec Nordiques	80	41	34	5	87	288	271	1399
Winnipeg Jets	80	39	35	6	84	307	306	1342
New England Whalers	80	37	34	9	83	298	287	1090
Cincinnati Stingers	80	33	41	6	72	274	284	1651
Birmingham Bulls	80	32	42	6	70	286	311	1661
xIndianapolis Racers	25	5	18	2	12	78	130	557
#Soviet All-Stars	6	4	1	1	9	27	20	77
#Czechoslovakia	6	1	4	1	3	14	33	107
#Finland	1	0	1	0	0	4	8	2

x-team folded during season #-played limited schedule

== Schedule and results ==
1978–79 regular season
October

Game	Result	Date	Score	Opponent	Record
1	L	October 13, 1978	2-3	@ Edmonton Oilers (1978–79)	0–1–0
2	W	October 15, 1978	4–3	@ Winnipeg Jets (1978–79)	1–1–0
3	T	October 17, 1978	5–5	@ Quebec Nordiques (1978–79)	1–1–1
4	W	October 20, 1978	5–2	Birmingham Bulls (1978–79)	2–1–1
5	W	October 21, 1978	4–3	Edmonton Oilers (1978–79)	3–1–1
6	L	October 24, 1978	1–2	New England Whalers (1978–79)	3–2–1
7	L	October 25, 1978	3–4	@ Quebec Nordiques (1978–79)	3–3–1
8	W	October 28, 1978	4–3	Quebec Nordiques (1978–79)	4–3–1
9	W	October 29, 1978	7–4	@ New England Whalers (1978–79)	5–3–1

November

Game	Result	Date	Score	Opponent	Record
10	L	November 1, 1978	3–4 OT	Birmingham Bulls (1978–79)	5–4–1
11	W	November 5, 1978	5–4	New England Whalers (1978–79)	6–4–1
12	W	November 8, 1978	4–0	Indianapolis Racers (1978–79)	7–4–1
13	W	November 10, 1978	3–2	Winnipeg Jets (1978–79)	8–4–1
14	L	November 11, 1978	1–2	@ New England Whalers (1978–79)	8–5–1
15	W	November 12, 1978	5–3	Edmonton Oilers (1978–79)	9–5–1
16	T	November 15, 1978	4–4	New England Whalers (1978–79)	9–5–2
17	L	November 17, 1978	6–10	@ Winnipeg Jets (1978–79)	9–6–2
18	L	November 19, 1978	3–6	@ Edmonton Oilers (1978–79)	9–7–2
19	W	November 22, 1978	6–5 OT	Birmingham Bulls (1978–79)	10–7–2
20	W	November 23, 1978	4–3	@ Birmingham Bulls (1978–79)	11–7–2
21	W	November 24, 1978	8–5	Indianapolis Racers (1978–79)	12–7–2
22	L	November 25, 1978	3–6	@ Indianapolis Racers (1978–79)	12–8–2

December

Game	Result	Date	Score	Opponent	Record
23	W	December 1, 1978	6–5	@ Winnipeg Jets (1978–79)	13–8–2
24	L	December 2, 1978	0–2	@ Quebec Nordiques (1978–79)	13–9–2
25	W	December 3, 1978	4–2	@ Indianapolis Racers (1978–79)	14–9–2
26	T	December 5, 1978	2–2	New England Whalers (1978–79)	14–9–3
27	L	December 7, 1978	2–4	@ Birmingham Bulls (1978–79)	14–10–3
28	L	December 9, 1978	3–4	@ Quebec Nordiques (1978–79)	14–11–3
29	L	December 10, 1978	0–1	@ Birmingham Bulls (1978–79)	14–12–3
30	L	December 12, 1978	2–5	Edmonton Oilers (1978–79)	14–13–3
31	T	December 16, 1978	2–2	Birmingham Bulls (1978–79)	14–13–4
32	L	December 17, 1978	3–6	@ Winnipeg Jets (1978–79)	14–14–4
33	L	December 20, 1978	3–5	Soviet All-Stars (1978–79)	14–15–4
34	W	December 23, 1978	6–2	Quebec Nordiques (1978–79)	15–15–4
35	L	December 26, 1978	2–4	@ Birmingham Bulls (1978–79)	15–16–4
36	L	December 28, 1978	5–6	Birmingham Bulls (1978–79)	15–17–4
37	W	December 30, 1978	2–1	New England Whalers (1978–79)	16–17–4

January

Game	Result	Date	Score	Opponent	Record
38	L	January 6, 1979	1–4	Czechoslovakia (1978–79)	16–18–4
39	L	January 7, 1979	4–5	@ New England Whalers (1978–79)	16–19–4
40	L	January 9, 1979	3–4	Quebec Nordiques (1978–79)	16–20–4
41	L	January 12, 1979	1–2	Quebec Nordiques (1978–79)	16–21–4
42	W	January 14, 1979	4–2	Birmingham Bulls (1978–79)	17–21–4
43	W	January 17, 1979	8–5	Birmingham Bulls (1978–79)	18–21–4
44	W	January 19, 1979	7–2	@ Winnipeg Jets (1978–79)	19–21–4
45	L	January 20, 1979	1–3	@ New England Whalers (1978–79)	19–22–4
46	T	January 24, 1979	5–5	Winnipeg Jets (1978–79)	19–22–5
47	W	January 26, 1979	5–2	@ Edmonton Oilers (1978–79)	20–22–5
48	L	January 28, 1979	0–3	@ Edmonton Oilers (1978–79)	20–23–5

February

Game	Result	Date	Score	Opponent	Record
49	L	February 4, 1979	1–8	@ Winnipeg Jets (1978–79)	20–24–5
50	L	February 7, 1979	5–8	@ Edmonton Oilers (1978–79)	20–25–5
51	W	February 9, 1979	4–0	Winnipeg Jets (1978–79)	21–25–5
52	W	February 11, 1979	5–2	New England Whalers (1978–79)	22–25–5
53	L	February 14, 1979	1–5	Winnipeg Jets (1978–79)	22–26–5
54	W	February 17, 1979	6–4	Winnipeg Jets (1978–79)	23–26–5
55	L	February 18, 1979	2–4	Quebec Nordiques (1978–79)	23–27–5
56	W	February 20, 1979	5–2	Winnipeg Jets (1978–79)	24–27–5
57	L	February 23, 1979	1–3	@ Edmonton Oilers (1978–79)	24–28–5
58	T	February 25, 1979	1–1	@ Quebec Nordiques (1978–79)	24–28–6

March

Game	Result	Date	Score	Opponent	Record
59	L	March 2, 1979	2–5	@ Edmonton Oilers (1978–79)	24–29–6
60	L	March 3, 1979	4–6	Edmonton Oilers (1978–79)	24–30–6
61	W	March 4, 1979	4–3 OT	@ New England Whalers (1978–79)	25–30–6
62	L	March 7, 1979	3–5	Winnipeg Jets (1978–79)	25–31–6
63	W	March 10, 1979	5–2	Quebec Nordiques (1978–79)	26–31–6
64	L	March 11, 1979	1–2	New England Whalers (1978–79)	26–32–6
65	W	March 13, 1979	5–1	Edmonton Oilers (1978–79)	27–32–6
66	L	March 16, 1979	3–5	@ Winnipeg Jets (1978–79)	27–33–6
67	W	March 18, 1979	4–1	@ New England Whalers (1978–79)	28–33–6
68	W	March 20, 1979	5–2	Birmingham Bulls (1978–79)	29–33–6
69	L	March 23, 1979	1–2	@ Birmingham Bulls (1978–79)	29–34–6
70	L	March 24, 1979	2–5	Quebec Nordiques (1978–79)	29–35–6
71	L	March 25, 1979	5–6	Edmonton Oilers (1978–79)	29–36–6
72	L	March 28, 1979	3–6	@ Winnipeg Jets (1978–79)	29–37–6
73	W	March 30, 1979	3–2	@ Birmingham Bulls (1978–79)	30–37–6
74	L	March 31, 1979	3–6	@ Birmingham Bulls (1978–79)	30–38–6

April

Game	Result	Date	Score	Opponent	Record
75	L	April 3, 1979	1–5	Edmonton Oilers (1978–79)	30–39–6
76	W	April 7, 1979	6–2	Quebec Nordiques (1978–79)	31–39–6
77	W	April 11, 1979	6–2	@ Quebec Nordiques (1978–79)	32–39–6
78	L	April 12, 1979	0–4	@ New England Whalers (1978–79)	32–40–6
79	W	April 14, 1979	4–0	@ New England Whalers (1978–79)	33–40–6
80	L	April 15, 1979	2–4	@ Quebec Nordiques (1978–79)	33–41–6

Legend: Win (2 points) Loss (0 points) Tie (1 point)

== Playoffs ==
1979 Avco Cup playoffs
Quarterfinals vs. New England Whalers – Whalers win 2–1

Game	Date	Visitor	Score	Home	Series
1	April 21	Cincinnati Stingers	3–5	New England Whalers	0–1
2	April 22	New England Whalers	3–6	Cincinnati Stingers	1–1
3	April 24	New England Whalers	2–1	Cincinnati Stingers	1–2

Legend: Win Loss

== See also ==
- 1978–79 WHA season
