= Kevin Nugent (ice hockey) =

American ice hockey player (born 1955)

- Born: June 7, 1955 (age 71) Little Falls, Minnesota, U.S.
- Height: 6 ft 5 in (196 cm)
- Weight: 230 lb (104 kg; 16 st 6 lb)
- Position: Right wing
- Shot: Right
- Played for: Indianapolis Racers
- NHL draft: 171st overall, 1975; Boston Bruins
- Playing career: 1978–1979

Kevin Nugent (born June 7, 1955) is an American former professional ice hockey player.

== Early life ==
Nugent was born in Little Falls, Minnesota, and raised in Edina. At the age of 14, he captained the first team in the state to win the USA national bantam championship in hockey. He attended Hill-Murray School, where captained its team in his junior and senior years. Nugent was a member of the Notre Dame Fighting Irish men's ice hockey team from 1974 to 1978. He played in 131 games, in which he was credited with 54 goals and 75 assists.

== Career ==
Nugent played for the Indianapolis Racers, in the World Hockey Association where, during the 1978–'79 season, he was the first linemate that Wayne Gretzky had in professional hockey.

== Personal life ==
As of 2008, Nugent resides in Connecticut with his wife and four children, of whom Kevin Jr. played a season for the Tri-City Storm of the USHL and became a forward on the Notre Dame 2009–2010 freshman squad.

== Career statistics ==
| | | | Regular season | | | | | Playoffs |
| Season | Team | League | GP | G | A | Pts | PIM | GP | G | A | Pts | PIM |
|---|---|---|---|---|---|---|---|---|---|---|---|---|
| 1974–75 | University of Notre Dame | NCAA | 35 | 7 | 12 | 19 | 74 | — | — | — | — | — |
| 1975–76 | University of Notre Dame | NCAA | 39 | 17 | 18 | 35 | 59 | — | — | — | — | — |
| 1976–77 | University of Notre Dame | NCAA | 37 | 16 | 26 | 42 | 54 | — | — | — | — | — |
| 1977–78 | University of Notre Dame | NCAA | 30 | 14 | 19 | 33 | 95 | — | — | — | — | — |
| 1978–79 | Dallas Black Hawks | CHL | 4 | 2 | 2 | 4 | 20 | — | — | — | — | — |
| 1978–79 | Indianapolis Racers | WHA | 25 | 2 | 8 | 10 | 20 | — | — | — | — | — |
| WHA totals | | | 25 | 2 | 8 | 10 | 20 | — | — | — | — | — |
