= Dean Magee =

Canadian ice hockey player

- Born: April 29, 1955 (age 70); Banff, Alberta, Canada
- Height: 6 ft 2 in (188 cm)
- Weight: 215 lb (98 kg; 15 st 5 lb)
- Position: Centre
- Shot: Left
- Played for: Minnesota North Stars; Indianapolis Racers
- NHL draft: 130th overall, 1975; Minnesota North Stars
- Playing career: 1978–1980

Dean James Magee (born April 29, 1955) is a former Canadian ice hockey centre. He played 7 games in the National Hockey League with the Minnesota North Stars during the 1977–78 season and 5 games in the World Hockey Association with the Indianapolis Racers during the 1978–79 season.

== Career statistics ==
=== Regular season and playoffs ===
			Regular season					Playoffs
Season	Team	League	GP	G	A	Pts	PIM	GP	G	A	Pts	PIM
1972–73	Calgary Canucks	AJHL	—	—	—	—	—	—	—	—	—	—
1973–74	Calgary Canucks	AJHL	56	36	30	66	142	—	—	—	—	—
1974–75	Colorado College	WCHA	38	15	13	28	—	—	—	—	—	—
1975–76	Colorado College	WCHA	33	9	7	16	104	—	—	—	—	—
1976–77	Colorado College	WCHA	39	23	18	41	144	—	—	—	—	—
1977–78	Colorado College	WCHA	25	13	15	28	60	—	—	—	—	—
1977–78	Fort Worth Texans	CHL	3	0	0	0	0	—	—	—	—	—
1977–78	Minnesota North Stars	NHL	7	0	0	0	4	—	—	—	—	—
1978–79	Grand Rapids Owls	IHL	68	35	37	72	148	21	15	11	26	45
1978–79	Indianapolis Racers	WHA	5	0	1	1	10	—	—	—	—	—
1979–80	Houston Apollos	CHL	70	24	34	58	73	6	2	4	6	6
WHA totals			5	0	1	1	10	—	—	—	—	—
NHL totals			7	0	0	0	4	—	—	—	—	—
