= 1978–79 Birmingham Bulls season =

World Hockey Association team season

1978–79 Birmingham Bulls
- League: 6th WHA
- 1978–79 record: 32–42–6
- Home record: 20–16–5
- Road record: 12–26–1
- Goals for: 286
- Goals against: 311

Team information
- Coach: John Brophy
- Captain: Brent Hughes
- Alternate captains: Paul Henderson; Serge Beaudoin
- Arena: Birmingham–Jefferson Convention Complex

Team leaders
- Goals: Michel Goulet (28)
- Assists: Craig Hartsburg (40)
- Points: Rick Vaive (59)
- Penalty minutes: Rick Vaive (248)
- Wins: Pat Riggin (16)
- Goals against average: Ernie Wakely (3.76)

The 1978–79 Birmingham Bulls season was the Bulls' final season of operation in the World Hockey Association (WHA). They finished in 6th and last place and were not invited to join the NHL in the NHL-WHA merger.

Their worst game of the season was an 11-3 loss to the Edmonton Oilers on January 19.

== Regular season ==
=== Final standings ===
Note: W = Wins, L = Losses, T = Ties, GF= Goals for, GA = Goals against, Pts = Points

WHA Team	GP	W	L	T	Pts	GF	GA	PIM
Edmonton Oilers	80	48	30	2	98	340	266	1220
Quebec Nordiques	80	41	34	5	87	288	271	1399
Winnipeg Jets	80	39	35	6	84	307	306	1342
New England Whalers	80	37	34	9	83	298	287	1090
Cincinnati Stingers	80	33	41	6	72	274	284	1651
Birmingham Bulls	80	32	42	6	70	286	311	1661
xIndianapolis Racers	25	5	18	2	12	78	130	557
#Soviet All-Stars	6	4	1	1	9	27	20	77
#Czechoslovakia	6	1	4	1	3	14	33	107
#Finland	1	0	1	0	0	4	8	2

x-team folded during season #-played limited schedule

== Schedule and results ==
1978–79 regular season
October

Game	Result	Date	Score	Opponent	Record
1	L	October 13, 1978	4–5 OT	Winnipeg Jets (1978–79)	0–1–0
2	W	October 15, 1978	9–3	@ Indianapolis Racers (1978–79)	1–1–0
3	L	October 20, 1978	2–5	@ Cincinnati Stingers (1978–79)	1–2–0
4	W	October 22, 1978	8–5	@ Quebec Nordiques (1978–79)	2–2–0
5	W	October 24, 1978	3–2	@ Edmonton Oilers (1978–79)	3–2–0
6	L	October 25, 1978	2–7	@ Winnipeg Jets (1978–79)	3–3–0
7	W	October 27, 1978	4–2	Indianapolis Racers (1978–79)	4–3–0

November

Game	Result	Date	Score	Opponent	Record
8	W	November 1, 1978	4–3 OT	@ Cincinnati Stingers (1978–79)	5–3–0
9	L	November 3, 1978	2–3	Quebec Nordiques (1978–79)	5–4–0
10	L	November 4, 1978	1–4	Quebec Nordiques (1978–79)	5–5–0
11	W	November 9, 1978	6–5	Winnipeg Jets (1978–79)	6–5–0
12	L	November 11, 1978	3–5	Edmonton Oilers (1978–79)	6–6–0
13	T	November 14, 1978	5–5	New England Whalers (1978–79)	6–6–1
14	W	November 17, 1978	7–1	New England Whalers (1978–79)	7–6–1
15	W	November 18, 1978	3–2	@ New England Whalers (1978–79)	8–6–1
16	L	November 22, 1978	5–6 OT	@ Cincinnati Stingers (1978–79)	8–7–1
17	L	November 23, 1978	3–4	Cincinnati Stingers (1978–79)	8–8–1
18	L	November 25, 1978	2–5	@ New England Whalers (1978–79)	8–9–1
19	L	November 26, 1978	3–9	@ New England Whalers (1978–79)	8–10–1
20	L	November 29, 1978	4–7	@ Quebec Nordiques (1978–79)	8–11–1

December

Game	Result	Date	Score	Opponent	Record
21	L	December 1, 1978	3–6	@ Indianapolis Racers (1978–79)	8–12–1
22	W	December 2, 1978	4–2	Indianapolis Racers (1978–79)	9–12–1
23	W	December 7, 1978	4–2	Cincinnati Stingers (1978–79)	10–12–1
24	W	December 9, 1978	6–2	Edmonton Oilers (1978–79)	11–12–1
25	W	December 10, 1978	1–0	Cincinnati Stingers (1978–79)	12–12–1
26	L	December 14, 1978	2–3	@ Quebec Nordiques (1978–79)	12–13–1
27	T	December 16, 1978	2–2	@ Cincinnati Stingers (1978–79)	12–13–2
28	T	December 17, 1978	2–2	Soviet All-Stars (1978–79)	12–13–3
29	L	December 19, 1978	2–5	Edmonton Oilers (1978–79)	12–14–3
30	L	December 22, 1978	1–5	Quebec Nordiques (1978–79)	12–15–3
31	L	December 23, 1978	3–4	@ New England Whalers (1978–79)	12–16–3
32	W	December 26, 1978	4–2	Cincinnati Stingers (1978–79)	13–16–3
33	W	December 28, 1978	6–5	@ Cincinnati Stingers (1978–79)	14–16–3
34	L	December 29, 1978	0–5	@ New England Whalers (1978–79)	14–17–3
35	L	December 30, 1978	2–3	@ Quebec Nordiques (1978–79)	14–18–3

January

Game	Result	Date	Score	Opponent	Record
36	W	January 7, 1979	10–2	Czechoslovakia (1978–79)	15–18–3
37	L	January 12, 1979	1–3	Winnipeg Jets (1978–79)	15–19–3
38	L	January 13, 1979	1–3	Winnipeg Jets (1978–79)	15–20–3
39	L	January 14, 1979	2–4	@ Cincinnati Stingers (1978–79)	15–21–3
40	L	January 17, 1979	5–8	@ Cincinnati Stingers (1978–79)	15–22–3
41	L	January 19, 1979	3–11	@ Edmonton Oilers (1978–79)	15–23–3
42	W	January 21, 1979	4–3	@ Edmonton Oilers (1978–79)	16–23–3
43	L	January 23, 1979	5–7	Quebec Nordiques (1978–79)	16–24–3
44	W	January 26, 1979	5–4	New England Whalers (1978–79)	17–24–3
45	W	January 30, 1979	2–1	Quebec Nordiques (1978–79)	18–24–3

February

Game	Result	Date	Score	Opponent	Record
46	W	February 1, 1979	7–5	Quebec Nordiques (1978–79)	19–24–3
47	T	February 3, 1979	2–2	New England Whalers (1978–79)	19–24–4
48	L	February 6, 1979	2–6	@ Edmonton Oilers (1978–79)	19–25–4
49	L	February 7, 1979	2–3	@ Winnipeg Jets (1978–79)	19–26–4
50	L	February 11, 1979	3–4 OT	@ Edmonton Oilers (1978–79)	19–27–4
51	W	February 14, 1979	7–4	@ New England Whalers (1978–79)	20–27–4
52	W	February 16, 1979	2–1	Winnipeg Jets (1978–79)	21–27–4
53	L	February 18, 1979	3–6	Edmonton Oilers (1978–79)	21–28–4
54	L	February 20, 1979	3–7	Quebec Nordiques (1978–79)	21–29–4
55	W	February 23, 1979	9–1	Winnipeg Jets (1978–79)	22–29–4
56	L	February 25, 1979	4–5	@ Edmonton Oilers (1978–79)	22–30–4
57	W	February 27, 1979	5–2	@ Winnipeg Jets (1978–79)	23–30–4

March

Game	Result	Date	Score	Opponent	Record
58	L	March 3, 1979	2–3	@ Quebec Nordiques (1978–79)	23–31–4
59	L	March 4, 1979	4–5	@ Quebec Nordiques (1978–79)	23–32–4
60	W	March 6, 1979	5–4	Winnipeg Jets (1978–79)	24–32–4
61	T	March 9, 1979	4–4	Edmonton Oilers (1978–79)	24–32–5
62	L	March 11, 1979	0–4	Edmonton Oilers (1978–79)	24–33–5
63	L	March 13, 1979	3–4	New England Whalers (1978–79)	24–34–5
64	W	March 15, 1979	4–3 OT	@ New England Whalers (1978–79)	25–34–5
65	T	March 16, 1979	5–5	New England Whalers (1978–79)	25–34–6
66	L	March 18, 1979	2–4	@ Winnipeg Jets (1978–79)	25–35–6
67	L	March 20, 1979	2–5	@ Cincinnati Stingers (1978–79)	25–36–6
68	W	March 23, 1979	2–1	Cincinnati Stingers (1978–79)	26–36–6
69	W	March 24, 1979	4–3	@ New England Whalers (1978–79)	27–36–6
70	L	March 25, 1979	2–3	@ Quebec Nordiques (1978–79)	27–37–6
71	W	March 27, 1979	3–1	New England Whalers (1978–79)	28–37–6
72	L	March 30, 1979	2–3	Cincinnati Stingers (1978–79)	28–38–6
73	W	March 31, 1979	6–3	Cincinnati Stingers (1978–79)	29–38–6

April

Game	Result	Date	Score	Opponent	Record
74	W	April 3, 1979	5–3	Quebec Nordiques (1978–79)	30–38–6
75	W	April 6, 1979	2–1	@ Winnipeg Jets (1978–79)	31–38–6
76	L	April 8, 1979	4–5	@ Edmonton Oilers (1978–79)	31–39–6
77	L	April 11, 1979	1–2	@ Winnipeg Jets (1978–79)	31–40–6
78	L	April 13, 1979	4–6	Edmonton Oilers (1978–79)	31–41–6
79	W	April 14, 1979	7–6	Edmonton Oilers (1978–79)	32–41–6
80	L	April 15, 1979	4–5 OT	@ Winnipeg Jets (1978–79)	32–42–6

Legend: Win (2 points) Loss (0 points) Tie (1 point)

== See also ==
- 1978–79 WHA season
