= Gerry Leroux =

Canadian ice hockey player

- Born: June 9, 1958 (age 67) St. Bernardin, Ontario, Canada
- Height: 5 ft 6 in (168 cm)
- Weight: 165 lb (75 kg; 11 st 11 lb)
- Position: Left wing
- Shot: Left
- Played for: WHA; Indianapolis Racers; IHL; Muskegon Mohawks; Flint Generals
- NHL draft: Undrafted
- Playing career: 1978–1984

Gerald Leroux (born June 9, 1958) is a Canadian former professional ice hockey player.

During the 1978–79 season, Leroux played ten games in the World Hockey Association with the Indianapolis Racers.

== Career statistics ==
=== Regular season and playoffs ===
| | | | Regular season | | | | | Playoffs |
| Season | Team | League | GP | G | A | Pts | PIM | GP | G | A | Pts | PIM |
|---|---|---|---|---|---|---|---|---|---|---|---|---|
| 1976–77 | Windsor Spitfires | OHA | 63 | 34 | 40 | 74 | 101 | — | — | — | — | — |
| 1977–78 | Windsor Spitfires | OHA | 68 | 57 | 66 | 123 | 85 | — | — | — | — | — |
| 1978–79 | Muskegon Mohawks | IHL | 26 | 9 | 16 | 25 | 39 | — | — | — | — | — |
| 1978–79 | Flint Generals | IHL | 33 | 15 | 26 | 41 | 21 | 11 | 5 | 2 | 7 | 28 |
| 1978–79 | Indianapolis Racers | WHA | 10 | 0 | 3 | 3 | 2 | — | — | — | — | — |
| 1979–80 | Flint Generals | IHL | 67 | 36 | 36 | 72 | 114 | 5 | 3 | 5 | 8 | 11 |
| WHA totals | | | 10 | 0 | 3 | 3 | 2 | — | — | — | — | — |
