= Angie Moretto =

Canadian ice hockey player

- Born: September 18, 1953 (age 72) Downsview, Ontario, Canada
- Height: 6 ft 4 in (193 cm)
- Weight: 216 lb (98 kg; 15 st 6 lb)
- Position: Centre
- Shot: Right
- Played for: Chicago Blackhawks; Calgary Flames; Colorado Avalanche; SCL Tigers; Adler Mannheim; EC KAC
- NHL draft: 160th overall, 1973; California Golden Seals
- Playing career: 1976–1979

Angelo Joseph Moretto (born September 18, 1953) is a Canadian retired professional ice hockey forward who played five games in the National Hockey League for the Cleveland Barons and 18 games in the World Hockey Association for the Indianapolis Racers between 1976 and 1979.

Moretto was born in Toronto, Ontario. Moretto married Donna Bucci Moretto in 1977. They have two children.

== Career statistics ==
=== Regular season and playoffs ===
| | | | Regular season | | | | | Playoffs |
| Season | Team | League | GP | G | A | Pts | PIM | GP | G | A | Pts | PIM |
|---|---|---|---|---|---|---|---|---|---|---|---|---|
| 1971–72 | Wexford Raiders | MTJHL | 41 | 37 | 32 | 69 | 45 | — | — | — | — | — |
| 1972–73 | University of Michigan | B-10 | 30 | 10 | 17 | 27 | 36 | — | — | — | — | — |
| 1973–74 | University of Michigan | B-10 | 34 | 25 | 22 | 47 | 28 | — | — | — | — | — |
| 1974–75 | University of Michigan | B-10 | 38 | 39 | 28 | 67 | 43 | — | — | — | — | — |
| 1975–76 | University of Michigan | B-10 | 27 | 24 | 18 | 42 | 50 | — | — | — | — | — |
| 1976–77 | Cleveland Barons | NHL | 5 | 1 | 2 | 3 | 2 | — | — | — | — | — |
| 1976–77 | Salt Lake Golden Eagles | CHL | 71 | 19 | 13 | 32 | 19 | — | — | — | — | — |
| 1977–78 | Phoenix Roadrunners | CHL | 14 | 1 | 6 | 7 | 22 | — | — | — | — | — |
| 1978–79 | Oklahoma City Stars | CHL | 47 | 17 | 21 | 38 | 28 | — | — | — | — | — |
| 1978–79 | Indianapolis Racers | WHA | 18 | 3 | 1 | 4 | 2 | — | — | — | — | — |
| WHA totals | | | 18 | 3 | 1 | 4 | 2 | — | — | — | — | — |
| NHL totals | | | 5 | 1 | 2 | 3 | 2 | — | — | — | — | — |
