= Wes George =

Canadian ice hockey player (born 1958)

- Born: September 26, 1958 (age 67) Young, Saskatchewan, Canada
- Height: 6 ft 3 in (191 cm)
- Weight: 220 lb (100 kg; 15 st 10 lb)
- Position: Left wing
- Shot: Left
- Played for: WHA; Edmonton Oilers; Indianapolis Racers; AHL; Binghamton Dusters; IHL; Flint Generals; EHL; Johnstown Red Wings
- NHL draft: 112th overall, 1978; Detroit Red Wings
- Playing career: 1978–1980

Wes George (born September 26, 1958) is a Canadian former professional ice hockey player. He was selected by the Detroit Red Wings in the 8th round (112th overall) of the 1978 NHL Amateur Draft, but had already signed a contract with the Edmonton Oilers of the World Hockey Association prior to the NHL draft.

George played two seasons of professional hockey, mostly (73 games) in the minor-pro IHL, AHL and EHL. During his first (1978–79) professional season, George played 12 games in the World Hockey Association – three with the Edmonton Oilers and nine with the Indianapolis Racers.

== Career statistics ==
=== Regular season and playoffs ===
			Regular season					Playoffs
Season	Team	League	GP	G	A	Pts	PIM	GP	G	A	Pts	PIM
1974–75	Saskatoon Blades	WCHL	67	15	18	33	201	17	0	0	0	15
1975–76	Saskatoon Blades	WCHL	55	20	20	40	246	20	8	11	19	91
1976–77	Saskatoon Blades	WCHL	39	14	19	33	107	6	4	5	9	28
1977–78	Saskatoon Blades	WCHL	70	38	40	78	205	––	––	––	––	––
1978–79	Broome Dusters	AHL	8	1	1	2	2	10	0	0	0	0
1978–79	Flint Generals	IHL	15	9	2	11	72	––	––	––	––	––
1978–79	Edmonton Oilers	WHA	3	0	0	0	11	––	––	––	––	––
1978–79	Indianapolis Racers	WHA	9	4	2	6	23	––	––	––	––	––
1979–80	Johnstown Red Wings	EHL	54	21	29	50	92	––	––	––	––	––
1980–81	Elk Valley Blazers	WIHL	35	18	38	56	129
WHA totals			12	4	2	6	34	—	—	—	—	—
