= John Gray (ice hockey) =

Canadian ice hockey player

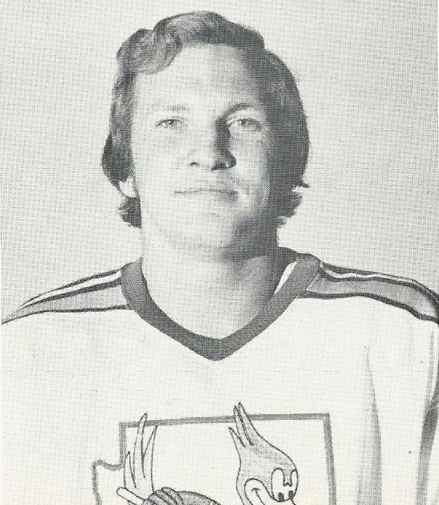
- Born: August 13, 1949 (age 76) Little Current, Ontario, Canada
- Height: 5 ft 10 in (178 cm)
- Weight: 180 lb (82 kg; 12 st 12 lb)
- Position: Left wing
- Shot: Left
- Played for: Phoenix Roadrunners; Houston Aeros; Winnipeg Jets
- Playing career: 1969–1979

John Gordon Gray (born August 13, 1949) is a Canadian retired professional ice hockey winger who played 363 games in the World Hockey Association. He played with the Phoenix Roadrunners, Houston Aeros, and Winnipeg Jets.

== Career statistics ==
=== Regular season and playoffs ===
			Regular season					Playoffs
Season	Team	League	GP	G	A	Pts	PIM	GP	G	A	Pts	PIM
1969–70	University of New Hampshire	ECAC	20	22	11	33	32	—	—	—	—	—
1970–71	University of New Hampshire	ECAC	20	30	20	50	39	—	—	—	—	—
1971–72	University of New Hampshire	ECAC	30	29	33	62	44	—	—	—	—	—
1972–73	Tulsa Oilers	CHL	68	15	25	40	147	—	—	—	—	—
1973–74	Oklahoma City Blazers	CHL	59	25	35	60	155	10	4	3	7	14
1974–75	Phoenix Roadrunners	WHA	75	35	33	68	107	5	2	3	5	12
1975–76	Phoenix Roadrunners	WHA	79	35	45	80	136	5	1	1	2	7
1976–77	Phoenix Roadrunners	WHA	28	10	10	20	59	—	—	—	—	—
1976–77	Houston Aeros	WHA	47	21	20	41	25	6	0	1	1	8
1977–78	Houston Aeros	WHA	77	35	23	58	80	6	0	3	3	10
1978–79	Winnipeg Jets	WHA	57	10	15	25	51	1	0	0	0	0
WHA totals			363	146	146	292	458	23	3	8	11	37
