= Rich LeDuc =

Canadian ice hockey player

Rich Leduc
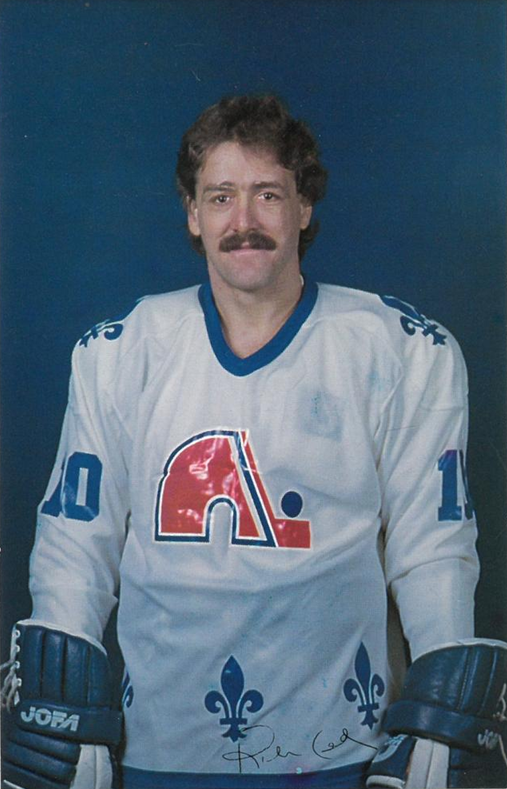
- LeDuc in 1980 postcard
- Born: August 24, 1951 (age 74) L'Île-Perrot, Quebec, Canada
- Height: 5 ft 11 in (180 cm)
- Weight: 170 lb (77 kg; 12 st 2 lb)
- Position: Centre
- Shot: Left
- Played for: Boston Bruins; Cleveland Crusaders; Cincinnati Stingers; Indianapolis Racers; Quebec Nordiques
- NHL draft: 29th overall, 1971; California Golden Seals
- Playing career: 1971–1981

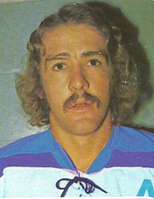
LeDuc in 1975 card

Richard Henri Leduc (born August 24, 1951) is a Canadian former professional ice hockey player who played 130 games in the National Hockey League and 394 games in the World Hockey Association. He played for the Boston Bruins, Cleveland Crusaders, Cincinnati Stingers, Indianapolis Racers, and Quebec Nordiques between 1973 and 1980.

== Honours ==
In 2012, he was inducted into the World Hockey Association Hall of Fame.

== Career statistics ==
=== Regular season and playoffs ===
			Regular season					Playoffs
Season	Team	League	GP	G	A	Pts	PIM	GP	G	A	Pts	PIM
1967–68	Trois-Rivieres Maple Leafs	QJAHL	—	—	—	—	—	—	—	—	—	—
1968–69	Trois-Rivieres Maple Leafs	QJAHL	—	48	74	122	—	—	—	—	—	—
1968–69	Sorel Black Hawks	QJAHL	—	—	—	—	—	—	—	—	—	—
1968–69	Sorel Black Hawks	M-Cup	—	—	—	—	—	—	—	—	—	—
1969–70	Trois-Rivieres Ducs	QMJHL	55	61	90	151	253	—	—	—	—	—
1970–71	Trois-Rivieres Ducs	QMJHL	59	56	76	132	195	11	9	10	19	59
1971–72	Cleveland Barons	AHL	14	1	4	5	27	—	—	—	—	—
1971–72	Boston Braves	AHL	61	26	27	53	92	9	3	3	6	34
1972–73	Boston Braves	AHL	65	31	42	73	75	10	9	5	14	4
1972–73	Boston Bruins	NHL	5	1	1	2	2	—	—	—	—	—
1973–74	Boston Braves	AHL	29	7	11	18	60	—	—	—	—	—
1973–74	Boston Bruins	NHL	28	3	3	6	12	5	0	0	0	9
1974–75	Cleveland Crusaders	WHA	78	34	31	65	122	5	0	2	2	2
1975–76	Cleveland Crusaders	WHA	79	36	22	58	76	3	2	1	3	2
1976–77	Cincinnati Stingers	WHA	81	52	55	107	75	4	1	3	4	16
1977–78	Cincinnati Stingers	WHA	54	27	31	58	44	—	—	—	—	—
1977–78	Indianapolis Racers	WHA	28	10	15	25	38	—	—	—	—	—
1978–79	Indianapolis Racers	WHA	13	5	9	14	14	—	—	—	—	—
1978–79	Quebec Nordiques	WHA	61	30	32	62	30	4	0	2	2	0
1979–80	Quebec Nordiques	NHL	75	21	27	48	49	—	—	—	—	—
1980–81	Rochester Americans	AHL	23	5	7	12	35	—	—	—	—	—
1980–81	Oklahoma City Stars	CHL	19	5	8	13	6	3	1	2	3	0
1980–81	Quebec Nordiques	NHL	22	3	7	10	6	—	—	—	—	—
WHA totals			394	194	195	389	399	16	3	8	11	20
NHL totals			130	28	38	66	69	5	0	0	0	9
