= Eddie Mio =

Canadian ice hockey player (born 1954)

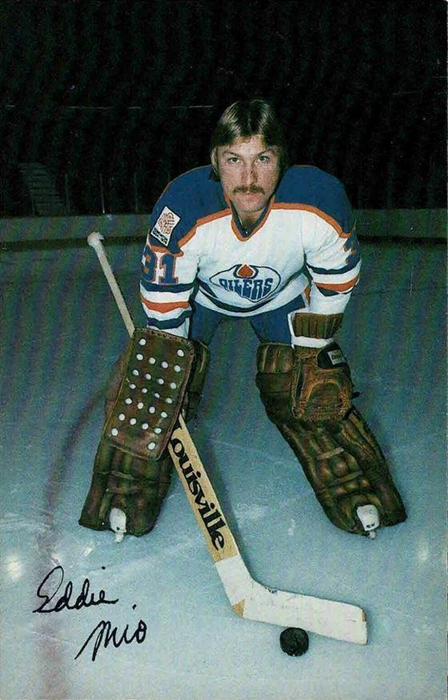
- Mio in 1979 postcard
- Born: January 31, 1954 (age 72) Windsor, Ontario, Canada
- Position: Goaltender
- Caught: Left
- Played for: Indianapolis Racers; Edmonton Oilers; New York Rangers; Detroit Red Wings
- NHL draft: 124th overall, 1974; Chicago Blackhawks
- WHA draft: 138th overall, 1974; Vancouver Blazers
- Playing career: 1977–1986

Edward Dario Mio (born January 31, 1954) is a Canadian former professional ice hockey goaltender who played in the World Hockey Association (WHA) for the Indianapolis Racers and Edmonton Oilers between 1977 and 1979, and in the National Hockey League (NHL) for the Oilers, New York Rangers, and Detroit Red Wings between 1979 and 1986.

== Playing career ==
Mio attended Colorado College from 1972 to 76. During that time, he established himself as a standout, winning first- and second-team all-star awards and making the NCAA West first all-American team two years in a row.

In 1974, the National Hockey League's (NHL) Chicago Black Hawks and the World Hockey Association's (WHA) Vancouver Blazers both drafted him. He played for neither club, wending his way instead through the minor leagues with the Tidewater Sharks, Erie Blades, and Hampton Gulls until he surfaced with the Indianapolis Racers of the WHA.

With the Racers, Mio's goaltending was rough, but the most meaningful event of his career occurred when he met his lifelong friend, Wayne Gretzky. Shortly after their meeting, Mio was part of the trade that sent Gretzky (along with Peter Driscoll) to the Edmonton Oilers on November 2, 1978.

When the Oilers moved to the NHL for the 1979–80 season, Mio got his first NHL action, part of the young, highly talented lineup that included Gretzky, Mark Messier, Kevin Lowe, Glenn Anderson and Paul Coffey. Mio had his first winning season in 1980–81 before being traded to the New York Rangers.

In New York, Mio backstopped the Rangers for two seasons before rounding out his career with the Detroit Red Wings in 1985–86.

== Post-hockey ==
Mio was a player agent with International Management Group, representing Sergei Fedorov, Joe Thornton and Brent Johnson. In 2005, Mio became the director of player development for the Phoenix Coyotes. In 2010, having left the NHL, Mio considered running for mayor in his hometown of Windsor, Ontario. At the 2014 NHL Winter Classic, Mio played an exhibition game with the Detroit Red Wings alumni team, splitting time with Kevin Hodson in a winning effort against the Toronto Maple Leafs alumni team.

== Career statistics ==
=== Regular season and playoffs ===
			Regular season									Playoffs
Season	Team	League	GP	W	L	T	MIN	GA	SO	GAA	SV%	GP	W	L	MIN	GA	SO	GAA	SV%
1972–73	Colorado College	WCHA	23	6	17	0	1322	119	0	5.40	.875	—	—	—	—	—	—	—	—
1973–74	Colorado College	WCHA	13	4	7	2	698	57	0	4.90	.882	—	—	—	—	—	—	—	—
1974–75	Colorado College	WCHA	21	—	—	—	1260	83	0	3.95	—	—	—	—	—	—	—	—	—
1975–76	Colorado College	WCHA	34	15	18	1	2038	144	0	4.24	—	—	—	—	—	—	—	—	—
1976–77	Tidewater Sharks	SHL	19	—	—	—	1123	66	1	3.53	.900	—	—	—	—	—	—	—	—
1976–77	Erie Blades	NAHL	17	4	6	2	771	42	0	3.27	.908	2	0	1	80	8	0	6.00	—
1977–78	Hampton Gulls	AHL	19	5	9	0	949	53	2	3.35	.899	—	—	—	—	—	—	—	—
1977–78	Indianapolis Racers	WHA	17	6	8	0	900	64	0	4.27	.864	—	—	—	—	—	—	—	—
1978–79	Dallas Black Hawks	CHL	7	4	3	0	424	25	0	3.54	.887	—	—	—	—	—	—	—	—
1978–79	Indianapolis Racers	WHA	5	2	2	1	242	13	1	3.22	.915	—	—	—	—	—	—	—	—
1978–79	Edmonton Oilers	WHA	22	7	10	0	1068	71	1	3.99	.853	3	0	0	90	6	0	4.00	—
1979–80	Edmonton Oilers	NHL	34	9	13	5	1711	120	1	4.21	.868	—	—	—	—	—	—	—	—
1980–81	Edmonton Oilers	NHL	43	16	15	9	2393	155	0	3.89	.867	—	—	—	—	—	—	—	—
1981–82	Wichita Wind	CHL	11	3	8	0	657	46	0	4.20	.878	—	—	—	—	—	—	—	—
1981–82	New York Rangers	NHL	25	13	6	5	1500	89	0	3.56	.885	8	4	3	442	28	0	3.80	.874
1982–83	New York Rangers	NHL	41	16	18	6	2365	136	2	3.45	.883	8	5	3	478	32	0	4.02	.892
1983–84	Detroit Red Wings	NHL	24	7	11	3	1295	95	1	4.40	.860	1	0	1	63	3	0	2.86	.875
1983–84	Adirondack Red Wings	AHL	4	1	1	2	250	11	0	2.64	.917	—	—	—	—	—	—	—	—
1984–85	Detroit Red Wings	NHL	7	1	3	2	376	27	0	4.31	.845	—	—	—	—	—	—	—	—
1984–85	Adirondack Red Wings	AHL	33	19	12	1	1871	117	2	3.75	.889	—	—	—	—	—	—	—	—
1985–86	Detroit Red Wings	NHL	18	2	7	0	788	83	0	6.32	.817	—	—	—	—	—	—	—	—
1985–86	Adirondack Red Wings	AHL	8	4	1	3	487	32	0	3.94	.875	—	—	—	—	—	—	—	—
WHA totals			44	15	20	1	2210	148	2	4.02	.866	3	0	0	90	6	0	4.00	—
NHL totals			192	64	73	30	10406	705	4	4.07	.867	17	9	7	982	63	0	3.85	.884

== Awards and honors ==
Award	Year
All-WCHA Second Team	1974–75
AHCA West All-American	1974–75
All-WCHA First Team	1975–76
AHCA West All-American	1975–76
