= 1978–79 WHA season =

Professional ice hockey league season

- League: World Hockey Association
- Sport: Ice hockey
- Duration: October 13, 1978 – May 20, 1979

Regular season
- Season champions: Edmonton Oilers
- Season MVP: Dave Dryden (Edmonton)
- Top scorer: Réal Cloutier (Quebec)

Playoffs
- Playoffs MVP: Rich Preston (Jets)

Avco Cup Final
- Champions: Winnipeg Jets
- Runners-up: Edmonton Oilers

WHA seasons
- 1977–78

The 1978–79 WHA season was the seventh and final season of the World Hockey Association (WHA). Prior to the start of the season, the Houston Aeros folded leaving seven teams to start the season. Only six would finish however, as the Indianapolis Racers folded after 25 games on December 15, 1978. The remaining six teams each played 80 games, including one game each per team against a Soviet All-Star squad and the Czechoslovak National Team, the second consecutive year for this arrangement. The Soviet team won four of their six games and tied another; the Czechoslovak team only won once and tied once against four losses. In addition, because the Racers had folded after playing an odd number of games, the Edmonton Oilers played the Finnish national team (with future Oiler Jari Kurri) once at home so as to allow each of the six surviving WHA teams to play 80 regular-season games. The Oilers won by a score of 8–4, a result which in itself made no difference by the end of the regular season which Edmonton won by an 11-point margin over the Quebec Nordiques.

During the season, an agreement was reached whereby four of the WHA's teams, the Edmonton Oilers, Quebec Nordiques, Winnipeg Jets and New England Whalers would be admitted to the National Hockey League (NHL) as expansion teams for the 1979–80 NHL season, and the WHA would cease operations. The Cincinnati and Birmingham franchises were paid a sum to fold.

== Regular-season and playoff format ==
The season started on October 13, 1978 with the Winnipeg Jets playing the Birmingham Bulls in Birmingham and the Edmonton Oilers playing the Cincinnati Stingers in Edmonton. A variety of teams boasted of their young talent: the Cincinnati Stingers had Mike Gartner, a 19-year-old pro, while the Bulls had a under-20 quintet of Rob Ramage, Craig Hartsburg, Pat Riggin, Rick Vaive, and Michel Goulet. Rounding out the young talent was Wayne Gretzky, who was signed by Nelson Skalbania, the owner of Indianapolis Racers to an unprecedented personal contract worth between $1.125 and $1.75 million over four to seven years. Then as now, the National Hockey League's rules did not permit the signing of 17-year-olds. Skalbania, knowing that the WHA's long-term prospects were poor, felt owning the young star was more valuable than owning a WHA team. Eight games into the season, though, Skalbania needed cash and sold Gretzky to his old friend and former partner, Peter Pocklington, owner of the Edmonton Oilers. Pocklington purchased Gretzky and two other Indianapolis players, goaltender Eddie Mio and forward Peter Driscoll, paying $700,000 for the contracts of the three players. On Gretzky's 18th birthday, Pocklington signed him to a 21-year personal services contract worth between $4 million and $5 million, the longest in hockey history. Gretzky would go on to capture the Lou Kaplan Trophy for rookie of the year, finish third in league scoring, and help the Oilers to first overall in the league. Nevertheless the Winnipeg Jets defeated Edmonton in the Avco World Trophy finals winning their third championship overall and second in a row.

Playoff format: The top five teams in the league qualified for the playoffs. The fourth- and fifth-place teams started in a best-of-three quarterfinal series, while the top three finishers received byes into the semifinals. In the semifinals, the first-place team played the 4th/5th winner, while second place played third place. Both semifinal series were best-of-seven. Since the second- and third-place teams knew they would be playing each other in the semifinals; they started their series while the 4th/5th mini-series was still going on. The finals, like the semifinals, were a best-of-seven.

=== Final standings ===
Note: W = Wins, L = Losses, T = Ties, GF= Goals for, GA = Goals against, Pts = Points Note: W = Wins, L = Losses, T = Ties, GF= Goals for, GA = Goals against, Pts = Points

WHA Team	GP	W	L	T	Pts	GF	GA	PIM
Edmonton Oilers	80	48	30	2	98	340	266	1220
Quebec Nordiques	80	41	34	5	87	288	271	1399
Winnipeg Jets	80	39	35	6	84	307	306	1342
New England Whalers	80	37	34	9	83	298	287	1090
Cincinnati Stingers	80	33	41	6	72	274	284	1651
Birmingham Bulls	80	32	42	6	70	286	311	1661
xIndianapolis Racers	25	5	18	2	12	78	130	557
#Soviet All-Stars	6	4	1	1	9	27	20	77
#Czechoslovakia	6	1	4	1	3	14	33	107
#Finland	1	0	1	0	0	4	8	2

x-team folded during season #-played limited schedule

== Player stats ==
=== Scoring leaders ===
_{Bolded numbers indicate season leaders}

GP = Games played; G = Goals; A = Assists; Pts = Points; PIM = Penalty minutes

Player	Team	GP	G	A	Pts	PIM
Real Cloutier	Quebec Nordiques	77	**75**	54	**129**	48
Robbie Ftorek	Cincinnati Stingers	80	39	**77**	116	87
Wayne Gretzky	Indianapolis/Edmonton	80	46	64	110	19
Mark Howe	New England Whalers	77	42	65	107	32
Kent Nilsson	Winnipeg Jets	78	39	68	107	8
Morris Lukowich	Winnipeg Jets	80	65	34	99	119
Marc Tardif	Quebec Nordiques	74	41	55	96	98
Andre Lacroix	New England Whalers	78	32	56	88	34
Peter Sullivan	Winnipeg Jets	80	46	40	86	24
Terry Ruskowski	Winnipeg Jets	75	20	66	86	211

=== Leading goaltenders ===
_{Bolded numbers indicate season leaders}

GP = Games played; Min = Minutes played; W = Wins; L = Losses; T = Ties, GA = Goals against; GA = Goals against; SO = Shutouts; SV% = Save percentage; GAA = Goals against average

Player	Team	GP	Min	W	L	T	GA	SO	SV%	GAA
Dave Dryden	Edmonton Oilers	**63**	**3531**	**41**	17	2	170	**3**	89.0	**2.89**
Richard Brodeur	Quebec Nordiques	42	2433	25	13	3	126	**3**	**90.1**	3.11
Jim Corsi	Quebec Nordiques	40	2291	16	20	1	126	**3**	89.9	3.30
Al Smith	New England Whalers	40	2396	17	17	**5**	132	1	88.3	3.31
Michel Dion	Cincinnati Stingers	30	1681	10	14	2	93	0	87.3	3.32

== All-Star series: Howe and Gretzky ==
A WHA all-star team played three games against Dynamo Moscow at Edmonton's Northlands Coliseum. The WHA All-Stars were coached by Jacques Demers, who asked Gordie Howe if it was okay to put him on a line with his son Mark Howe and with Wayne Gretzky. In the first game, this line scored seven points, as the WHA All-Stars won by a score of 4–2. In the second game, Gretzky and Mark Howe each scored a goal and Gordie Howe picked up an assist as the WHA won 4–2. The line did not score in the final game but the WHA won by a score of 4–3.

== Avco World Trophy playoffs ==
Winnipeg completed their WHA dynasty with their third Avco Cup championship, winning it over the Edmonton Oilers in six games. Oilers player Dave Semenko scored late in the third period of the deciding game to record the last goal in the history of the WHA. The goal was given up by the Winnipeg Jets' Gary Smith.

=== Playoff bracket ===
Quarterfinals
4	New England Whalers	2
5	Cincinnati Stingers	1

Semifinals
1	Edmonton Oilers	4
4	New England Whalers	3
2	Quebec Nordiques	0
3	Winnipeg Jets	4

Finals
1	Edmonton Oilers	2
3	Winnipeg Jets	4

== WHA awards ==
=== Trophies ===
Avco World Trophy:	Winnipeg Jets
Gordie Howe Trophy:	Dave Dryden, Edmonton Oilers
Bill Hunter Trophy:	Réal Cloutier, Quebec Nordiques
Lou Kaplan Trophy:	Wayne Gretzky, Edmonton Oilers
Ben Hatskin Trophy:	Dave Dryden, Edmonton Oilers
Dennis A. Murphy Trophy:	Rick Ley, New England Whalers
Paul Deneau Trophy:	Kent Nilsson, Winnipeg Jets
Robert Schmertz Memorial Trophy:	John Brophy, Birmingham Bulls
WHA Playoff MVP:	Rich Preston, Winnipeg Jets

=== All-Star Team ===
Position	First Team	Second Team
Centre	Robbie Ftorek, Cincinnati	Wayne Gretzky, Edmonton
Right Wing	Real Cloutier, Quebec	Blair MacDonald, Edmonton
Left Wing	Mark Howe, New England	Morris Lukowich, Winnipeg
Defence	Rick Ley, New England	Dave Langevin, Edmonton
Defence	Rob Ramage, Birmingham	Paul Shmyr, Edmonton
Goaltender	Dave Dryden, Edmonton	Richard Brodeur, Quebec

== See also ==
- 1978–79 NHL season
- 1979 NHL Expansion Draft
- 1978 in sports
- 1979 in sports

Preceded by 1977–78 WHA season	WHA seasons	Succeeded by None^{1}
