= Indianapolis Racers =

Former ice hockey team of the World Hockey Association

- City: Indianapolis, Indiana
- League: World Hockey Association
- Operated: 1974–1978
- Home arena: Market Square Arena
- Colors: Blue, white, red
- Media: WLWI-TV; WNDE
- Affiliates: Greensboro Generals

Championships
- Division titles: 1975–76 (East)

The Indianapolis Racers were a major league ice hockey team that played in the World Hockey Association (WHA) from 1974 to 1978. They competed in four full seasons before folding 25 games into the 1978–79 season. They played at Market Square Arena. They were the first major league professional team to secure Wayne Gretzky and Mark Messier.

== History ==
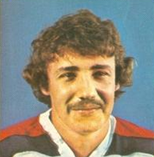
Reg Thomas, all-time leading scorer of the Racers

The Racers started as a WHA expansion team for the 1974–75 season alongside the Phoenix Roadrunners. John Weissert and Dick Tinkham, owners of the Indiana Pacers of the American Basketball Association, were the original owners of the team. On February 26, 1974, the team name was announced to be the Racers. The team hired Johnny Wilson as coach in January 1974, but he left the team to coach the Michigan Stags. On June 27, 1974, Gerry Moore became the head coach. In December 1974, the team was sold to former Houston Aeros owner Paul Deneau. Five games into the 1975–76 season, Moore was fired and replaced by Jacques Demers.

The Racers were known in the WHA for their sometimes-fanatical fans. The franchise led the WHA in attendance for the 1976–77 season. The Racers won the 1975–76 WHA Eastern Division championship and swept the rival Cincinnati Stingers in the 1977 WHA playoffs. Notable players for the Racers include Wayne Gretzky, Mark Messier, Pat Stapleton, Dave Keon, Michel Dion and Kim Clackson. The Racers' best-known coach, Jacques Demers, later led the Montreal Canadiens to the 1992–93 Stanley Cup championship. During the 1977 WHA playoffs they won the longest postseason game in WHA history 4–3 on April 9, when they defeated the Cincinnati Stingers at the Riverfront Coliseum in triple overtime on a goal by Gene Peacosh.

At the time of the Racers' founding, the only other major league competitor was the Indiana Pacers of the similarly upstart American Basketball Association, who eventually became part of the ABA-NBA merger in 1976. Reg Thomas was the all-time goals leader for the Racers, with 63 goals while Michel Parizeau had the most points with 136.

The team first encountered the threat of demise in 1977 of debt owed to the Indiana National Bank. Earlier in the year, the bank had taken control of the team's assets when loan repayments were not being made and made it clear they would not assume any of the liabilities. On July 11, the bank told the team that the debt of over $5 million was simply too much and that the Racers would have to fold, having insufficient money to either pay off their debt or fund an effort to join the National Hockey League (NHL). The failure of the WHA to merge with the NHL in the summer aided the Racers. On August 18, Nelson Skalbania, a flamboyant Canadian real estate businessman bought the team and $2.5 million of debt was written off by the bank. Skalbania, who regularly flipped real estate property and sports franchises for a profit, was repeatedly accused of mismanaging the promising Indianapolis hockey market and plotting to move the franchise to Canada, where it would presumably have had a much better chance of being included in an eventual merger the WHA was negotiating with the NHL. Having taken the firm position that no surviving Canadian WHA teams would be excluded from a merger, and knowing the NHL was barely willing to even consider taking in a small number of WHA teams, the WHA was not willing to risk upsetting delicate merger negotiations and rebuffed all proposals to add more teams in Canada.

Unable to move his team, Skalbania looked elsewhere to gain leverage in the ongoing merger discussions. He turned to underage players – the NHL had stringent rules regarding the age of players they could sign while the WHA regularly signed underage players. Skalbania's best-known signing was that of 17-year-old future superstar Wayne Gretzky, who signed a personal services contract worth between $1.125 and $1.75 million over four to seven years – at the time, one of the largest contracts ever offered a hockey player. The move did not improve the team's desperate financial situation, and just eight games into the 1978–79 season Skalbania liquidated his greatest asset to his old friend and former (and future) business partner, Peter Pocklington, owner of the Edmonton Oilers. Pocklington purchased the contracts of Gretzky and two other Indianapolis players, goaltender Eddie Mio and forward Peter Driscoll, paying a reported $700,000 for the contracts of the three players, although the announced price was $850,000. The Racers folded 17 games later on December 15, 1978, ending major league hockey in Indianapolis.

The other six WHA teams finished the season, and before the Winnipeg Jets won the 1979 Avco World Trophy, the league accepted the terms of a merger with the NHL whereby Edmonton, Winnipeg, Quebec, and New England would enter the NHL as "expansion teams" the following season and the WHA itself would cease operations. Cincinnati and Birmingham, the other surviving WHA teams, were paid to disband.

== Legacy ==
Best of the Racers 1975–6 with "Hockey Bob" Lamey

Mark Messier also began his career with the Racers in the 1978–79 season, playing five games but failing to register a point before finishing his tryout contract. He was picked up later by Cincinnati for the remainder of the season, before being selected by the Oilers in the 1979 NHL entry draft. Messier retired in 2004 as the last active player to have played in the WHA, and also the last active player to have played for the Racers.

Skalbania himself would ultimately become an NHL owner a year after the merger when he fronted a Calgary-based ownership group that purchased the Atlanta Flames and moved them north, where they became the Calgary Flames.

The Racers released a 45 single record with play by play calls by their radio announcer, Bob Lamey, from the 1975–76 season.

== Season-by-season record ==
List of Indianapolis Racers seasons
WHA season	Racers season	Division	Regular season								Avco Cup playoffs					
WHA season	Racers season	Division	Finish	GP	W	L	OT	Pts	GF	GA	GP	W	L	GF	GA	Result
1974–75	1974–75	Eastern	4th	78	18	57	3	39	216	338	—	—	—	—	—	Did not qualify
1975–76	1975–76	Eastern	1st	80	35	39	6	76	245	247	7	3	4	15	18	Lost Quarterfinal, 3–4 (Whalers)
1976–77	1976–77	Eastern	3rd	81	36	37	8	80	276	305	9	5	4	33	34	Won Quarterfinal, 4–0 (Stingers); Lost Semifinal, 1–4 (Nordiques)
1977–78	1977–78	WHA	8th	80	24	51	5	53	267	353	—	—	—	—	—	Did not qualify
1978–79	1978–79	WHA	DNF	25	5	18	2	12	78	130	—	—	—	—	—	Did not qualify
Totals				344	118	202	24	260	1082	1373	16	8	8			Two playoff appearances

== See also ==
- List of Indianapolis Racers players
- List of WHA seasons
- Indiana Ice
- Indianapolis Ice
- Indy Fuel
