= Colorado College Tigers men's ice hockey =

College ice hockey program

- Current season
- University: Colorado College
- Conference: NCHC
- Head coach: Kris Mayotte; 5th season, 61–77–10 (.446)
- Assistant coaches: Paul Pooley; John Lidgett; Jordy Murray
- Arena: Ed Robson Arena; Colorado Springs, Colorado
- Colors: Black and gold

NCAA tournament champions
- 1950, 1957

NCAA tournament runner-up
- 1952, 1955, 1996

NCAA tournament Frozen Four
- 1948, 1949, 1950, 1951, 1952, 1955, 1957, 1996, 1997, 2005

NCAA tournament appearances
- 1948, 1949, 1950, 1951, 1952, 1955, 1957, 1978, 1995, 1996, 1997, 1998, 1999, 2001, 2002, 2003, 2005, 2006, 2008, 2011

Conference tournament champions
- WCHA: 1978

Conference regular season champions
- WCHA: 1952, 1955, 1957, 1994, 1995, 1996, 2003, 2005, 2008

The Colorado College Tigers men's ice hockey team is a National Collegiate Athletic Association (NCAA) Division I college ice hockey program that represents Colorado College. The Tigers are a member of the National Collegiate Hockey Conference. They began play at Ed Robson Arena on the CC campus in Colorado Springs starting in the 2021 season.

== History ==
=== Early history ===
In 1938 Spencer Penrose and Charles Tutt developed plans to convert The Broadmoor's unused equestrian center into an indoor ice arena, known as the Broadmoor Ice Palace. After three weeks at a cost of $200,000 the Ice Palace opened and became the home of the Tigers Hockey program and the Broadmoor Skating Club. Colorado College Tiger Hockey began in 1938 playing in the Pikes Peak Hockey League with various local teams sponsored by Colorado Springs area businesses., The Tigers opened play on January 21, 1938 in a 1-8 loss to a team sponsored by Giddings Department Store. Garrett Livingston took over as head coach fin 1939 from John Atwood, who served as player/coach for the first season. Livingston increased recruiting, bringing players from Canada and New England and transitioned the program from the Pikes Peak Hockey League into an NCAA Division I independent program. The Tigers swept Michigan 4-2 and 4-3 in the program's first-ever intercollegiate series early in the 1939-40 season. That same season Colorado College also played games against Colorado School of Mines, Montana School of Mines, and the University of Southern California.

The program and college was suspended during World War II from 1942 to 1944. Colorado College, with the cooperation of The Broadmoor, sponsored the first National Collegiate Athletic Association Ice Hockey Championship to conclude the 1947-48 season. The tournament was held at the Ice Palace for the next 10 years, during which time CC participating seven times. Cheddy Thompson became the program's third head coach in 1945 after coming to Colorado Springs on assignment by the Air Force during the war. Thompson lead CC to the program's first NCAA championship in 1950 with a 13-4 win over Boston University. Colorado College became one of the founding members of the Mid-West Collegiate Hockey League (MWCHL) in 1951 with University of Denver, Michigan, Michigan State, Michigan Tech, Minnesota, and North Dakota. The league became the Western Intercollegiate Hockey League (WIHL) in 1953 and became the Western Collegiate Hockey Association (WCHA) in November 1959. The Tigers also finished as runner-up in 1952 and 1955, losing to Michigan in both appearances in the championship game. In addition, he was named national Coach of the Year in 1952 by the United States Hockey Coaches Association. The Tigers returned to the championship game in 1957 with Tom Bedecki behind the bench. CC beat Clarkson 5-3 in the semifinal round and won the school's second hockey championship with a 13-6 win over Michigan. In 1961 the Ice Palace became known as the Broadmoor World Arena. The 1957 championship was the final appearance in the NCAA Tournament until 1978. The Tigers finished the regular season and captured the school's first and only WCHA Tournament Championship and received a bid to the NCAA Tournament, in the first round the Tigers lost to Bowling Green State 3-5.

=== The lean years ===
Bedecki abruptly resigned in 1958, and the Tigers went into a decline that would last for almost four decades. From 1958 to 1993, the Tigers would have only three winning seasons. The low point came in 1961-62, when the Tigers finished with a 0-23 record, still the worst in school history.

=== Recent history ===
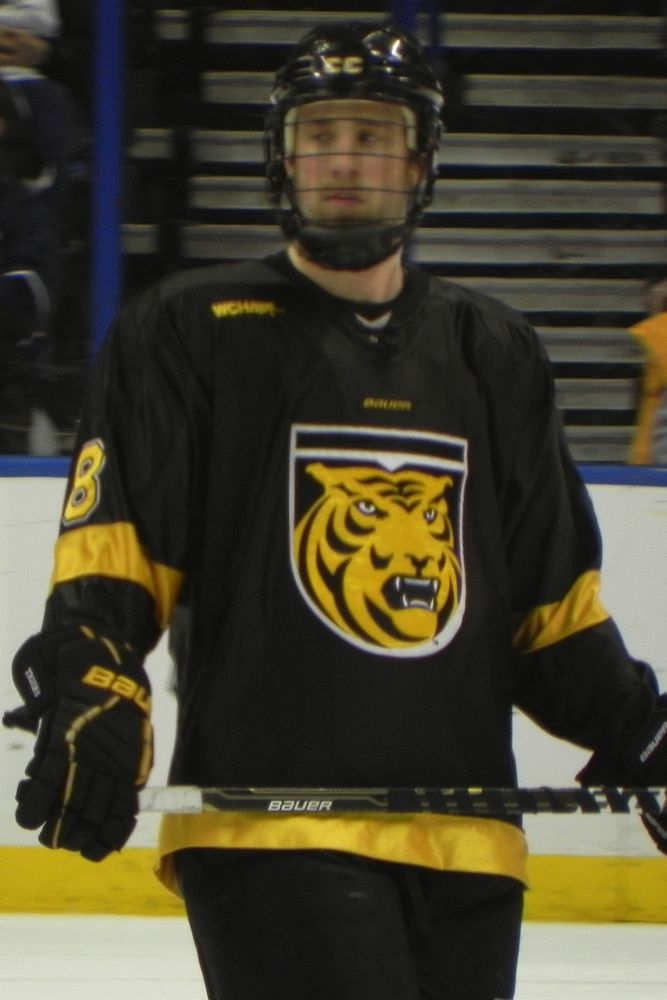
Jaden Schwartz during the 2011 NCAA Tournament

In 1993 Don Lucia became the head coach of the Tigers. In his first season, 1993–94, he led the team to win the MacNaughton Cup, given to the WCHA regular season champion. It was Colorado College's first Cup win since 1957. After serving as the Tigers' home ice for 55 years the Broadmoor World Arena closed in March 1994 and later demolished by The Broadmoor to make room for the resort's expansion. Colorado College was then invited by the Air Force Academy to play at their home ice, the Cadet Ice Arena until the new World Arena opened in 1998 on the southern side of Colorado Springs. The Tigers returned to the NCAA post season in 1995 for the first time since 1978. The Tigers lost in the quarterfinal round to Minnesota 2-5. The following season CC made a second straight NCAA tournament appearance, receiving a number one seed in 1996 NCAA Tournament. Colorado College beat UMass Lowell 5-3 in the quarterfinals and Vermont 4-3 in the semifinal round before losing to 2-3 in overtime to Michigan in the championship game. CC returned to the Frozen Four under Lucia for a second straight season in 1997 before losing to North Dakota 6-2. Lucia lead the Tigers to two additional NCAA Tournament appearances in 1998 and 1999 before leaving Colorado College to become head coach at Minnesota.

Scott Owens took over as head coach of the program in 1999 and lead the Tigers to three straight NCAA Tournaments in 2001, 2002, and 2003. In the 2005 Tournament The Tigers returned to the Frozen Four with a 4-3 victory over Michigan in the Midwest Regional Final. In the Semifinal round the Tigers fell to the eventual national champion and rival Denver 2-6. Owens lead CC to the NCAA Tournament again in 2006 Tournament and in 2008 Tournament, ending in first round exits both times. The Tigers returned to the NCAA Tournament in 2011. The Tigers upset the number one ranked team and defending National Champions, Boston College 8-4. The Tigers' win was led by freshman Jaden Schwartz, a first round draft choice of the St. Louis Blues making his St. Louis debut in the West Regional. The Tigers' season ended in the Regional final in a 1-2 loss to Michigan.

=== New arena in 2021 ===
In 2018, CC announced plans to build a new $38 million arena located on campus. The facility is named Edward J. Robson Arena in honor of 1954 CC alum and former Tigers hockey player Edward Robson. This is the Tigers' new home rink after playing at the World Arena since 1998.

The new arena has a capacity of 3,407, less than half that of World Arena. It features an NHL-sized rink instead of the World Arena's Olympic-size rink. Robson Arena sits around 6,050 feet above sea level, about 200 feet below the World Arena. Colorado College initially hoped for it to be ready for play by 2020. Changes made during the planning process, most notably the addition of a parking garage and a shift in the arena footprint within its city block, led to delays. The arena opened for the 2021–22 season.

== Season-by-season results ==
Source:

== Coaches ==
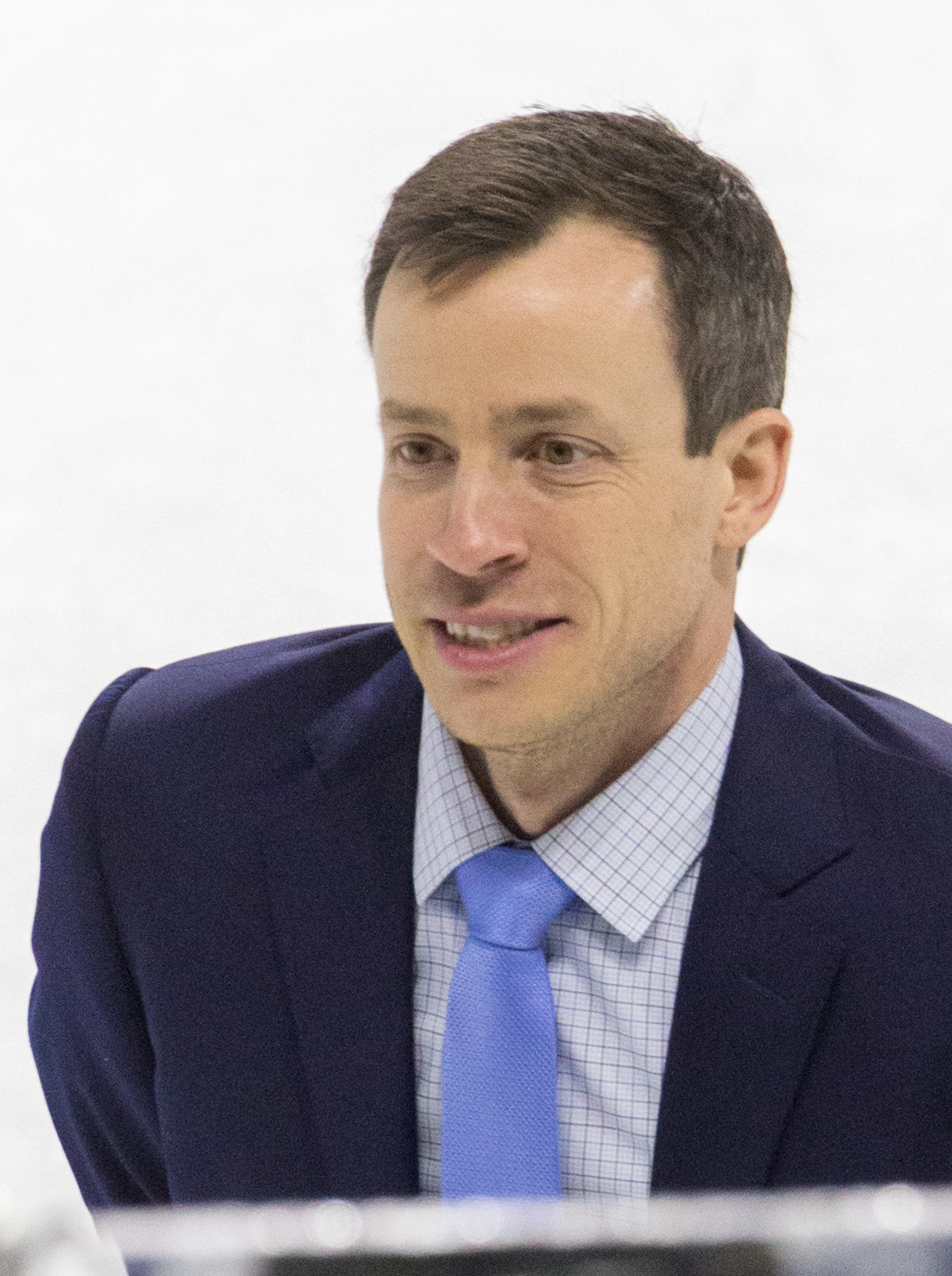
Kris Mayotte

As of the end of the 2024–25 season

| Tenure | Coach | Years | Record | Pct. |
|---|---|---|---|---|
| 1937–1938 | John Atwood | 1 | 3–9–0 | .250 |
| 1938–1942 | Garrett Livingston | 4 | 31–21–6 | .586 |
| 1944–1945 | C. E. Moore | 1 | 1–3–1 | .300 |
| 1945–1955 | Cheddy Thompson | 10 | 149–72–5 | .670 |
| 1955–1958 | Tom Bedecki | 3 | 59–28–1 | .676 |
| 1958–1963 | Tony Frasca | 5 | 30–85–4 | .269 |
| 1963–1966 | Bob Johnson | 3 | 27–49–4 | .363 |
| 1966–1971 | John Matchefts | 5 | 54–88–3 | .383 |
| 1971–1982 | Jeff Sauer | 11 | 166–228–11 | .423 |
| 1982–1988 | Mike Bertsch | 6 | 65–157–6 | .298 |
| 1988–1993 | Brad Buetow | 5 | 68–118–11 | .373 |
| 1993–1999 | Don Lucia | 6 | 166–68–18 | .694 |
| 1999–2014 | Scott Owens | 14 | 324–228–54 | .579 |
| 2014–2021 | Mike Haviland | 7 | 67–153–22 | .322 |
| 2021–Present | Kris Mayotte | 4 | 61–77–10 | .446 |
| Totals | 14 coaches | 85 seasons | 1,271–1,384–156 | .480 |

== Awards and honors ==
=== Hockey Hall of Fame ===
- Bob Johnson (1992)
- Bill Hay (2015)

=== United States Hockey Hall of Fame ===
- Art Berglund (2010)
- John Matchefts (1991)
- Bob Johnson (1991)
- Jeff Sauer (2014)

=== NCAA ===
==== Individual awards ====
Hobey Baker Award

- Peter Sejna: 2003
- Marty Sertich: 2005

Spencer Penrose Award

- Cheddy Thompson: 1952
- Tony Frasca: 1963
- Don Lucia: 1994

Tim Taylor Award

- Richard Bachman: 2008

NCAA Division I Ice Hockey Scoring Champion

- Bill Hay, C: 1958
- Peter Sejna, LW: 2003
- Marty Sertich, C: 2005
- Rylan Schwartz, C: 2013

NCAA Tournament Most Outstanding Player

- Ken Kinsley, G: 1952
- Phil Hilton, D: 1955
- Bob McCusker, LW: 1957

==== All-Americans ====
AHCA First Team All-Americans

- 1947-48: Joe Slattery, F
- 1948-49: Jim Starrak, D; Dick Starrak, D; Dick Rowell, F; Joe Slattery, F
- 1949-50: Jim Starrak, D
- 1950-51: Jim Starrak, D; Tony Frasca, F
- 1951-52: Tony Frasca, F; Ron Hartwell, F
- 1954-55: Doug Silverberg, D; Clare Smith, F
- 1955-56: Doug Silverberg, D
- 1956-57: Don Wishart, D; Bill Hay, F
- 1957-58: Bill Hay, F; Bob McCusker, F
- 1963-64: John Simus, F
- 1965-66: Bob Lindberg, F
- 1966-67: Bob Lindberg, F
- 1968-69: Bob Collyard, F
- 1969-70: Bob Collyard, F
- 1971-72: Bob Winograd, F; Doug Palazzari, F
- 1973-74: Doug Palazzari, F
- 1974-75: Eddie Mio, G
- 1975-76: Eddie Mio, G
- 1979-80: Dave Feamster, D
- 1982-83: Doug Lidster, D
- 1993-94: Shawn Reid, D
- 1995-96: Ryan Bach, G; Peter Geronazzo, F
- 1998-99: Scott Swanson, D; Brian Swanson, F
- 2002-03: Tom Preissing, D; Noah Clarke, F; Peter Sejna, F
- 2004-05: Curtis McElhinney, G; Mark Stuart, D; Marty Sertich, F; Brett Sterling, F
- 2005-06: Brett Sterling, F
- 2007-08: Richard Bachman, G; Jack Hillen, D
- 2011-12: Jaden Schwartz, F
- 2023–24: Kaidan Mbereko, G

AHCA Second Team All-Americans

- 1949-50: Chris Ray, F
- 1951-52: Ken Kinsley, G; Omer Brandt, F
- 1954-55: Phil Hilton, D
- 1956-57: Bob McCusker, F
- 1986-87: Rob Doyle, D
- 1991-92: Chris Hynnes, D
- 1994-95: Ryan Bach, G; Kent Fearns, D; Jay McNeill, F
- 1996-97: Calvin Elfring, D; Brian Swanson, F
- 2000-01: Mark Cullen, F
- 2001-02: Mark Cullen, F
- 2002-03: Curtis McElhinney, G
- 2004-05: Gabe Gauthier, F
- 2007-08: Chad Rau, F
- 2008-09: Chad Rau, F
- 2017-18: Nick Halloran, F
- 2023–24: Noah Laba, F

=== WCHA ===
==== Individual awards ====
WCHA Player of the Year

- Doug Palazzari, F: 1971–72, 1973–74
- Peter Sejna, LW: 2002–03
- Marty Sertich, C: 2004–05
- Richard Bachman, G: 2007–08

WCHA Outstanding Student-Athlete of the Year

- Tim Budy, G: 1988–89
- Scott Swanson, D: 1998–99
- Mark Cullen, C: 2001–02
- Tom Preissing, D: 2002–03
- Lee Sweatt, D: 2006–07

WCHA Defensive Player of the Year

- Chris Hynnes, D: 1992–93
- Shawn Reid, D: 1993–94
- Eric Rud, D: 1995–96, 1996–97
- Joe Cullen, C: 2002–03
- Mark Stuart, D: 2004–05
- Jack Hillen, D: 2007–08

WCHA Freshman/Rookie of the Year

- Jim Warner, RW: 1974–75
- Dave Delich, C: 1975–76
- Greg Whyte, C: 1977–78
- Brian Swanson, C: 1995–96
- Peter Sejna, LW: 2000–01
- Richard Bachman, G: 2007–08

WCHA Coach of the Year

- John Matchefts: 1968–69
- Jeff Sauer: 1971–72, 1974–75
- Brad Buetow: 1991–92
- Don Lucia: 1993–94, 1995–96

MCHA / WIHL / WCHA Scoring Leader

- Ron Hartwell, F: 1951–52
- John Andrews, F: 1955–56
- Bill Hay, C: 1957–58
- Doug Palazzari, C: 1971–72
- Dave Delich, C: 1978–79
- Brian Swanson, C: 1996–97, 1997–98
- Peter Sejna, LW: 2002–03
- Marty Sertich, C: 2004–05

MCHA / WIHL / WCHA Goaltending Leader

- Jeff Simus: 1954–55
- Judd Lambert: 1995–96
- Curtis McElhinney: 2002–03, 2004–05

WCHA Most Valuable Player in Tournament

- Brett Sterling: 2005

==== All-Conference ====
First Team All-WCHA

- 1951–52: Ken Kinsley, G; Tony Frasca, F; Ron Hartwell, F; Omer Brandt, F
- 1954–55: Phil Hilton, D; Clare Smith, F
- 1955–56: Doug Silverberg, D
- 1956–57: Don Wishart, D; Bill Hay, F; Bob McCusker, F
- 1957–58: Bill Hay, F; Ike Scott, F; Bob McCusker, F
- 1963–64: John Simus, F
- 1969–70: Bob Collyard, F
- 1970–71: Bob Collyard, F
- 1971-72: Bob Winograd, F; Doug Palazzari, F
- 1973-74: Doug Palazzari, F
- 1975-76: Eddie Mio, G
- 1979-80: Dave Feamster, D
- 1981-82: Doug Lidster, D
- 1982-83: Doug Lidster, D
- 1982-83: Rob Doyle, D
- 1991-92: Chris Hynnes, D
- 1993-94: Shawn Reid, D; Jay McNeill, F
- 1994-95: Ryan Bach, G; Jay McNeill, F
- 1995-96: Ryan Bach, G; Peter Geronazzo, F
- 1996-97: Brian Swanson, F
- 1997-98: Brian Swanson, F
- 1998-99: Scott Swanson, D; Brian Swanson, F
- 2000-01: Mark Cullen, F
- 2001-02: Mark Cullen, F
- 2002-03: Curtis McElhinney, G; Tom Preissing, D; Peter Sejna, F
- 2004-05: Curtis McElhinney, G; Marty Sertich, F; Brett Sterling, F
- 2005-06: Brett Sterling, F
- 2007-08: Richard Bachman, G; Jack Hillen, D; Chad Rau, F
- 2008-09: Chad Rau, F

Second team all-wcha

- 1953–54: Phil Hilton, D
- 1954–55: Jeff Simus, G; Doug Silverberg, D; Bunt Hubchik, F
- 1955–56: John Andrews, F; Clare Smith, F
- 1966–67: Bob Lindberg, F
- 1968–69: Bob Collyard, F
- 1974–75: Eddie Mio, G; Jim Warner, F
- 1977–78: Greg Whyte, F; Dave Delich, F
- 1978–79: Dave Feamster, D; Dave Delich, F
- 1979–80: Tom Frame, G
- 1980–81: Bruce Aikens, F
- 1984–85: Rob Doyle, D; Doug Clarke, D
- 1985–86: Rob Doyle, D
- 1986–87: Rick Boh, F
- 1993–94: Kent Fearns, D
- 1994–95: Kent Fearns, D; Peter Geronazzo, F; Colin Schmidt, F
- 1995–96: Judd Lambert, G; Scott Swanson, D; Brian Swanson, F; Colin Schmidt, F
- 1996–97: Eric Rud, D
- 1997–98: Calvin Elfring, D
- 1998–99: Dan Peters, D; Darren Clark, F
- 2000–01: Paul Manning, D
- 2002–03: Noah Clarke, F
- 2004–05: Mark Stuart, D
- 2005–06: Brian Salcido, D; Marty Sertich, F
- 2009–10: Nate Prosser, D
- 2011–12: Gabe Guentzel, D; Jaden Schwartz, F
- 2012–13: Mike Boivin, D; Rylan Schwartz, F

Third Team All-WCHA

- 1995–96: Eric Rud, D; Jay McNeill, F
- 1996–97: Calvin Elfring, D
- 1997–98: Scott Swanson, D
- 1999–00: Paul Manning, D
- 2000–01: Tom Preissing, D; Peter Sejna, F
- 2001–02: Tom Preissing, D; Peter Sejna, F
- 2003–04: Mark Stuart, D
- 2006–07: Lee Sweatt, D
- 2010–11: Jaden Schwartz, F
- 2011–12: Josh Thorimbert, G
- 2012–13: Mike Boivin, D; Rylan Schwartz, F

WCHA All-Rookie Team

- 1990–91: Shawn Reid, D
- 1991–92: Kent Fearns, D
- 1992–93: Jay McNeill, F
- 1993–94: Eric Rud, D
- 1994–95: Calvin Elfring, D
- 1995–96: Scott Swanson, D; Brian Swanson, F
- 1996–97: Toby Petersen, F
- 1997–98: Paul Manning, D
- 1998–99: Jesse Heerema, F
- 1999–00: Noah Clarke, F
- 2000–01: Peter Sejna, F
- 2002–03: Mark Stuart, D; Brett Sterling, F
- 2003–04: Matt Zaba, G
- 2007–08: Richard Bachman, G
- 2009–10: Joe Howe, G; Rylan Schwartz, F
- 2010–11: Jaden Schwartz, F
- 2012–13: Paul Geiger, D

=== NCHC ===
==== Individual awards ====
NCHC Rookie of the Year

- Jaccob Slavin, D: 2013–14

NCHC Goaltender of the Year

- Kaidan Mbereko: 2023–24

NCHC Defensive Forward of the Year

- Noah Laba: 2023–24

Herb Brooks Coach of the Year

- Kris Mayotte, 2023–24

NCHC Sportsmanship Award

- Eamonn McDermott, D: 2013–14

==== All-Conference ====
First Team All-NCHC

- 2014–15: Jaccob Slavin, D
- 2017–18: Nick Halloran, F
- 2023–24: Kaidan Mbereko, G; Noah Laba, F

Second team All-NCHC

- 2013–14: Jaccob Slavin, D
- 2022–23: Kaidan Mbereko, G
- 2024–25: Max Burkholder, D

NCHC All-Rookie Team

- 2013–14: Jaccob Slavin, D
- 2017–18: Mason Bergh, F
- 2022–23: Kaidan Mbereko, G

== Olympians ==
This is a list of Colorado College alumni who have played or coached on an Olympic team.

| Name | Position | CC Tenure | Team | Year | Finish |
|---|---|---|---|---|---|
| Andy Gambucci | Center | 1949–1953 | (United States) USA | 1952 | Silver |
| Dan Griffin | Goaltender | 1971–1975 | (United States) USA | 1976 | 5th |
| Gary Hughes | Defenseman | 1955–1958 | Poland (Coach) | 1964 | 9th |
| Roy Ikola | Goaltender | 1946–1950 | (United States) USA | 1948 | DQ |
| Doug Lidster | Defenseman | 1979–1983 | Canada | 1984 | 4th |
| Vern Mott | Goaltender | 1976–1977 | Norway | 1988 | 12th |
| Robert Rompre | Forward | 1950–1951, 1953–1956 | (United States) USA | 1952 | Silver |
| Steve Sertich | Right Wing | 1970–1974 | (United States) USA | 1976 | 5th |
| Jaccob Slavin | Defenseman | 2013–2015 | (United States) USA | 2026 | Gold |

== Colorado College Athletic Hall of Fame ==
The following is a list of people associated with the Colorado College men's ice hockey program who were elected into the Colorado College Athletic Hall of Fame (induction date in parentheses).

- Bill Hay (1995)
- 1950 National Champion Team (1998)
- Doug Palazzari (2000)
- Dave Delich (2002)
- 1957 National Champion Team (2003)
- Dave Taylor (1992)
- Andy Gambucci (2004)
- Tony Frasca (2005)
- William Spencer (2005)
- Art Berglund (2006)
- Jeff Sauer (2007)
- Cheddy Thompson (2013)
- 1996 National Runner-Up Team (2013)
- Rob Doyle (2015)
- Greg Smith (2017)
- Peter Sejna (2017)
- Douglas Mitchell (2017)

== Statistical leaders ==
=== Career points leaders ===
| Player | Years | GP | G | A | Pts | PIM |
|---|---|---|---|---|---|---|
| Dave Delich | 1975–1979 | 153 | 111 | 174 | 285 | |
| Brian Swanson | 1995–1999 | 167 | 88 | 144 | 232 | |
| Doug Palazzari | 1970–1974 | 117 | 95 | 133 | 228 | |
| Bruce Aikens | 1978–1982 | 137 | 100 | 117 | 217 | |
| Rob Doyle | 1983–1987 | 153 | 51 | 151 | 202 | |
| Jim Warner | 1974–1978 | 142 | 89 | 109 | 198 | |
| Greg Whyte | 1977–1981 | 149 | 86 | 111 | 197 | |
| Peter Sejna | 2000–2003 | 126 | 91 | 99 | 190 | |
| Jay McNeill | 1992–1996 | 158 | 100 | 89 | 189 | |
| Dave Feamster | 1976–1980 | 150 | 45 | 139 | 184 | |
| Brett Sterling | 2002–2006 | 150 | 108 | 76 | 184 | |

=== Career goaltending leaders ===
GP = Games played; Min = Minutes played; GA = Goals against; SO = Shutouts; SV% = Save percentage; GAA = Goals against average

Minimum 50 Games

| Player | Years | GP | Min | W | L | T | GA | SO | SV% | GAA |
|---|---|---|---|---|---|---|---|---|---|---|
| Richard Bachman | 2007–2009 | 70 | 4176 | 39 | 20 | 11 | 156 | 7 | .922 | 2.24 |
| Curtis McElhinney | 2001–2005 | 91 | 5153 | 62 | 15 | 8 | 199 | 9 | .911 | 2.32 |
| Matt Zaba | 2003–2007 | 110 | 6349 | 55 | 42 | 10 | 256 | 10 | .913 | 2.42 |
| Jeff Sanger | 1998–2002 | 127 | 7466 | 76 | 45 | 4 | 309 | 16 | .906 | 2.48 |
| Colin Zulianello | 1997–2001 | 60 | 3121 | | | | 135 | 2 | | 2.60 |

Statistics current through the start of the 2024-25 season.

== Players ==
=== Roster ===
As of August 11, 2025.

| No. | Nat. | Player | Class | Pos | Height | Weight | DoB | Hometown | Previous team | NHL rights |
|---|---|---|---|---|---|---|---|---|---|---|
| 1 | (United States) | Beckham Dempsey | Freshman | G | 6' 1" (1.85 m) | 183 lb (83 kg) | 2004-09-06 | Wayne, Illinois | Boston Junior Rangers (NCDC) | — |
| 3 | (United States) | Seth Constance | Sophomore | D | 6' 2" (1.88 m) | 187 lb (85 kg) | 2004-10-26 | Northville, Michigan | Northeastern (HEA) | — |
| 4 | (United States) | Max Burkholder | Junior | D | 5' 9" (1.75 m) | 176 lb (80 kg) | 2003-08-08 | Chaska, Minnesota | Dubuque Fighting Saints (USHL) | — |
| 5 | (United States) | Ryan Koering | Sophomore | D | 6' 3" (1.91 m) | 187 lb (85 kg) | 2005-02-11 | Eden Prairie, Minnesota | Muskegon Lumberjacks (USHL) | — |
| 6 | (Canada) | Colton Roberts | Freshman | D | 6' 4" (1.93 m) | 209 lb (95 kg) | 2006-06-08 | North Vancouver, British Columbia | Vancouver Giants (WHL) | SJS, 131st overall 2024 |
| 7 | (United States) | Philippe Blais-Savoie | Sophomore | D | 6' 0" (1.83 m) | 185 lb (84 kg) | 2005-06-10 | San Jose, California | Tri-City Storm (USHL) | — |
| 8 | (Canada) | Brandon Lisowsky | Freshman | F | 5' 9" (1.75 m) | 183 lb (83 kg) | 2004-04-13 | Port Coquitlam, British Columbia | Victoria Royals (WHL) | TOR, 218th overall 2022 |
| 9 | (Canada) | Owen Beckner | Sophomore | F | 6' 2" (1.88 m) | 181 lb (82 kg) | 2005-02-27 | Victoria, British Columbia | Tri-City Storm (USHL) | OTT, 204th overall 2023 |
| 10 | (United States) | Bret Link | Junior | F | 6' 3" (1.91 m) | 188 lb (85 kg) | 2002-04-09 | Anchorage, Alaska | Fargo Force (USHL) | — |
| 11 | (United States) | Shane Kozlina | Freshman | F | 5' 11" (1.8 m) | 174 lb (79 kg) | 2004-06-23 | Cranberry Township, Pennsylvania | Maine Nordiques (NAHL) | — |
| 12 | (United States) | Merril Steenari | Freshman | F | 5' 10" (1.78 m) | 181 lb (82 kg) | 2004-01-18 | Aliso Viejo, California | Fargo Force (USHL) | — |
| 14 | (Canada) | Connor Hvidston | Freshman | F | 6' 3" (1.91 m) | 185 lb (84 kg) | 2004-09-11 | Tisdale, Saskatchewan | Calgary Hitmen (WHL) | ANA, 139th overall 2022 |
| 15 | (United States) | Nick Baer | Sophomore | D | 6' 0" (1.83 m) | 181 lb (82 kg) | 2004-03-14 | Minnetonka, Minnesota | Bismarck Bobcats (NAHL) | — |
| 17 | (Canada) | Tomas Mrsic | Freshman | F | 6' 0" (1.83 m) | 174 lb (79 kg) | 2006-02-26 | Surrey, British Columbia | Prince Albert Raiders (WHL) | STL, 113th overall 2024 |
| 18 | (United States) | Fisher Scott | Sophomore | D | 6' 2" (1.88 m) | 179 lb (81 kg) | 2004-10-27 | Carbondale, Colorado | Dubuque Fighting Saints (USHL) | DET, 208th overall 2024 |
| 19 | (Canada) | Mateo Mrsic | Freshman | F | 5' 11" (1.8 m) | 185 lb (84 kg) | 2004-08-29 | Cloverdale, British Columbia | Chilliwack Chiefs (BCHL) | — |
| 20 | (United States) | Gavin Lindberg | Sophomore | F | 6' 0" (1.83 m) | 192 lb (87 kg) | 2004-04-20 | Fergus Falls, Minnesota | Waterloo Black Hawks (USHL) | — |
| 21 | (Canada) | Ryan Alexander | Senior | F | 5' 10" (1.78 m) | 178 lb (81 kg) | 2002-06-17 | Toronto, Ontario | Arizona State (NCHC) | — |
| 22 | (United States) | Jordan Brisson | Sophomore | F | 6' 1" (1.85 m) | 185 lb (84 kg) | 2003-12-01 | Manhattan Beach, California | Chicago Steel (USHL) | — |
| 24 | (Latvia) | Klāvs Veinbergs | Junior | F | 6' 3" (1.91 m) | 198 lb (90 kg) | 2003-03-27 | Riga, Latvia | Lincoln Stars (USHL) | TBL, 224th overall 2022 |
| 25 | (United States) | Riley Stuart | Junior | F | 6' 2" (1.88 m) | 201 lb (91 kg) | 2002-01-17 | Phoenix, Arizona | Dubuque Fighting Saints (USHL) | — |
| 26 | (Sweden) | Wilson Björck | Freshman | F | 6' 0" (1.83 m) | 165 lb (75 kg) | 2006-01-13 | Stockholm, Sweden | Djurgårdens IF U20 (J20 Nationell) | VAN, 143rd overall 2025 |
| 27 | (Canada) | Matteo Mann | Freshman | D | 6' 6" (1.98 m) | 229 lb (104 kg) | 2004-12-31 | Sackville, New Brunswick | Saint John Sea Dogs (QMJHL) | PHI, 199th overall 2023 |
| 28 | (Canada) | Brayden Schuurman | Freshman | F | 5' 10" (1.78 m) | 201 lb (91 kg) | 2004-02-22 | Abbotsford, British Columbia | Seattle Thunderbirds (WHL) | — |
| 29 | (United States) | Drew Montgomery | Junior | F | 5' 11" (1.8 m) | 174 lb (79 kg) | 2003-03-27 | Grand Forks, North Dakota | Omaha Lancers (USHL) | — |
| 30 | (Canada) | Jackson Unger | Freshman | G | 6' 2" (1.88 m) | 190 lb (86 kg) | 2005-01-13 | Calgary, Alberta | Lethbridge Hurricanes (WHL) | — |
| 33 | (United States) | Kaidan Mbereko | Junior | G | 5' 11" (1.8 m) | 185 lb (84 kg) | 2003-07-28 | Aspen, Colorado | Lincoln Stars (USHL) | — |

== Tigers in the NHL ==
Over 170 Colorado College alumni have gone on to play professionally, including over 30 current and former NHL players:
As of July 1, 2025.

| = NHL All-Star team | = NHL All-Star | = NHL All-Star and NHL All-Star team | = Hall of Famers |

| Player | Position | Team(s) | Years | Games | Stanley Cups |
|---|---|---|---|---|---|
| Ryan Bach | Goaltender | LAK | 1998–1999 | 3 | 0 |
| Richard Bachman | Goaltender | DAL, EDM, VAN | 2010–2019 | 48 | 0 |
| Rick Boh | Center | MNS | 1987–1988 | 8 | 0 |
| Noah Clarke | Left wing | LAK, NJD | 2003–2008 | 21 | 0 |
| Bob Collyard | Center | STL | 1973–1974 | 10 | 0 |
| Joey Crabb | Right wing | ATL, TOR, WAS, FLA | 2008–2014 | 179 | 0 |
| Mark Cullen | Right wing | CHI, PHI, FLA | 2005–2012 | 38 | 0 |
| Dave Feamster | Defenseman | CHI | 1981–1985 | 169 | 0 |
| Kris Fredheim | Defenseman | MIN | 2011–2012 | 3 | 0 |
| Trevor Frischmon | Center | CBJ | 2009–2010 | 3 | 0 |
| Bill Hay | Center | CHI | 1959–1967 | 506 | 1 |
| Jack Hillen | Defenseman | NYI, NSH, WAS, CAR | 2007–2015 | 304 | 0 |
| Doug Lidster | Defenseman | VAN, NYR, STL, DAL | 1983–1999 | 897 | 2 |
| Dean Magee | Center | MNS | 1977–1978 | 7 | 0 |
| Paul Manning | Defenseman | CBJ | 2002–2003 | 8 | 0 |
| Hunter McKown | Forward | CBJ | 2022–2023 | 12 | 0 |
| Curtis McElhinney | Goaltender | CGY, ANA, OTT, PHO, CBJ, TOR, CAR, TBL | 2007–2021 | 249 | 2 |
| Eddie Mio | Goaltender | EDM, NYR, DET | 1979–1986 | 192 | 0 |
| Gustav Olofsson | Defenseman | MIN, MTL, SEA | 2015–2024 | 63 | 0 |
| Doug Palazzari | Center | STL | 1974–1979 | 108 | 0 |

| Player | Position | Team(s) | Years | Games | Stanley Cups |
|---|---|---|---|---|---|
| Toby Petersen | Center | PIT, EDM, DAL | 2000–2014 | 398 | 0 |
| Richard Petiot | Defenseman | LAK, TBL, EDM | 2005–2011 | 15 | 0 |
| Tom Preissing | Defenseman | SJS, OTT, LAK, COL | 2003–2010 | 326 | 0 |
| Nate Prosser | Defenseman | MIN, STL, PHI | 2009–2021 | 360 | 0 |
| Chad Rau | Center | MIN | 2011–2012 | 9 | 0 |
| Brian Salcido | Defenseman | ANA | 2008–2009 | 2 | 0 |
| Jaden Schwartz | Left wing | STL, SEA, COL | 2011–Present | 882 | 1 |
| Peter Sejna | Left wing | STL | 2002–2007 | 49 | 0 |
| Jaccob Slavin | Defenseman | CAR | 2015–Present | 805 | 0 |
| Josiah Slavin | Left Wing | CHI | 2021–2022 | 15 | 0 |
| Greg Smith | Defenseman | CAL, CLE, MNS, DET, WAS | 1975–1988 | 829 | 0 |
| Brett Sterling | Left wing | ATL, PIT, STL | 2007–2012 | 30 | 0 |
| Colin Stuart | Left wing | ATL, BUF | 2007–2012 | 56 | 0 |
| Mark Stuart | Defenseman | BOS, ATL, WPG | 2005–2017 | 673 | 0 |
| Mike Stuart | Defenseman | STL | 2003–2006 | 3 | 0 |
| Brian Swanson | Center | EDM, ATL | 2000–2004 | 70 | 0 |
| Bill Sweatt | Left wing | VAN | 2011–2013 | 3 | 0 |
| Lee Sweatt | Defenseman | VAN | 2010–2011 | 3 | 0 |
| Jim Warner | Right wing | HFD | 1979–1980 | 32 | 0 |
| Matt Zaba | Goaltender | NYR | 2009–2010 | 1 | 0 |
| Noah Laba | Center | NYR | 2025-Present | 95 | 0 |

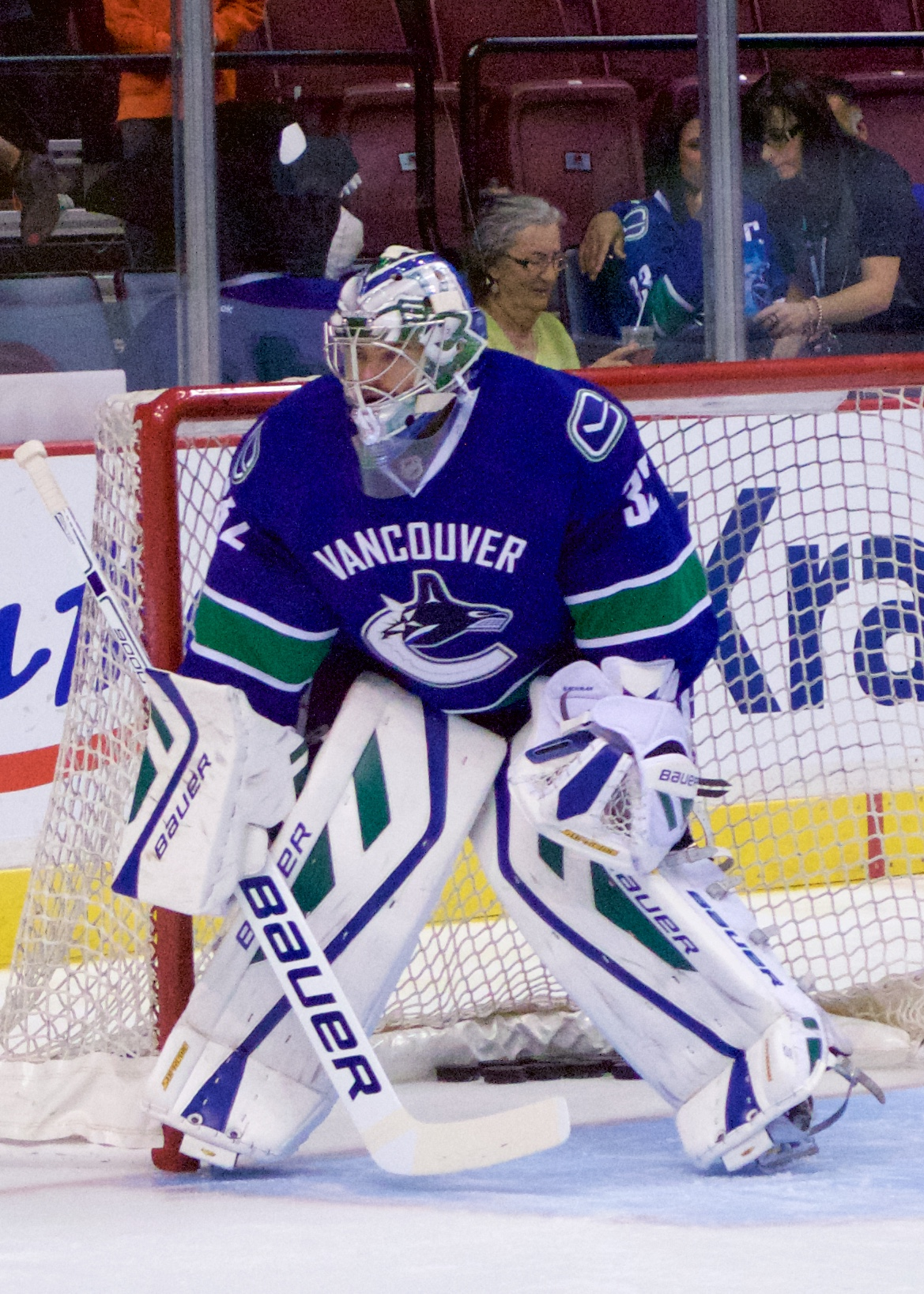
Richard Bachman

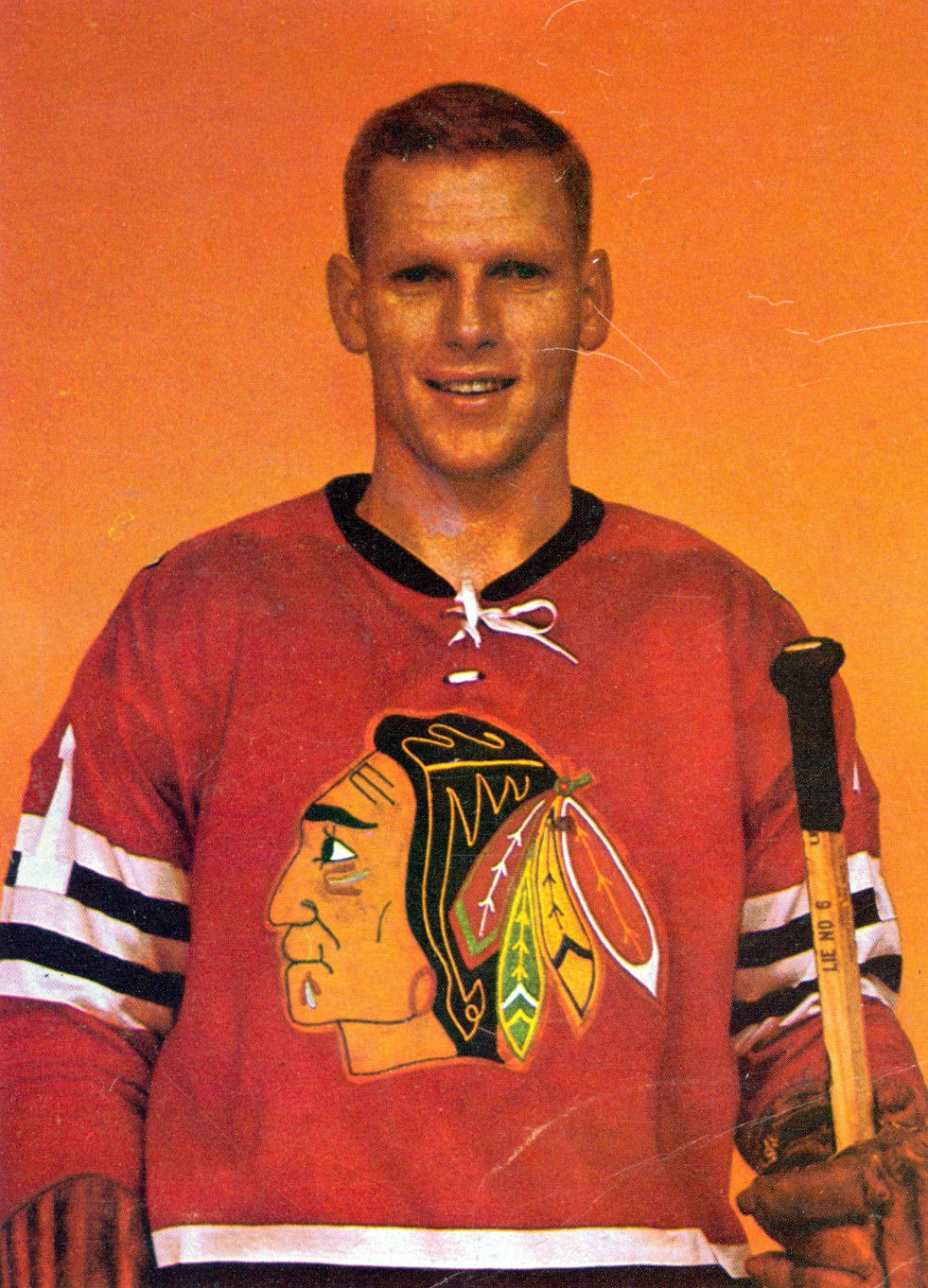
Bill Hay

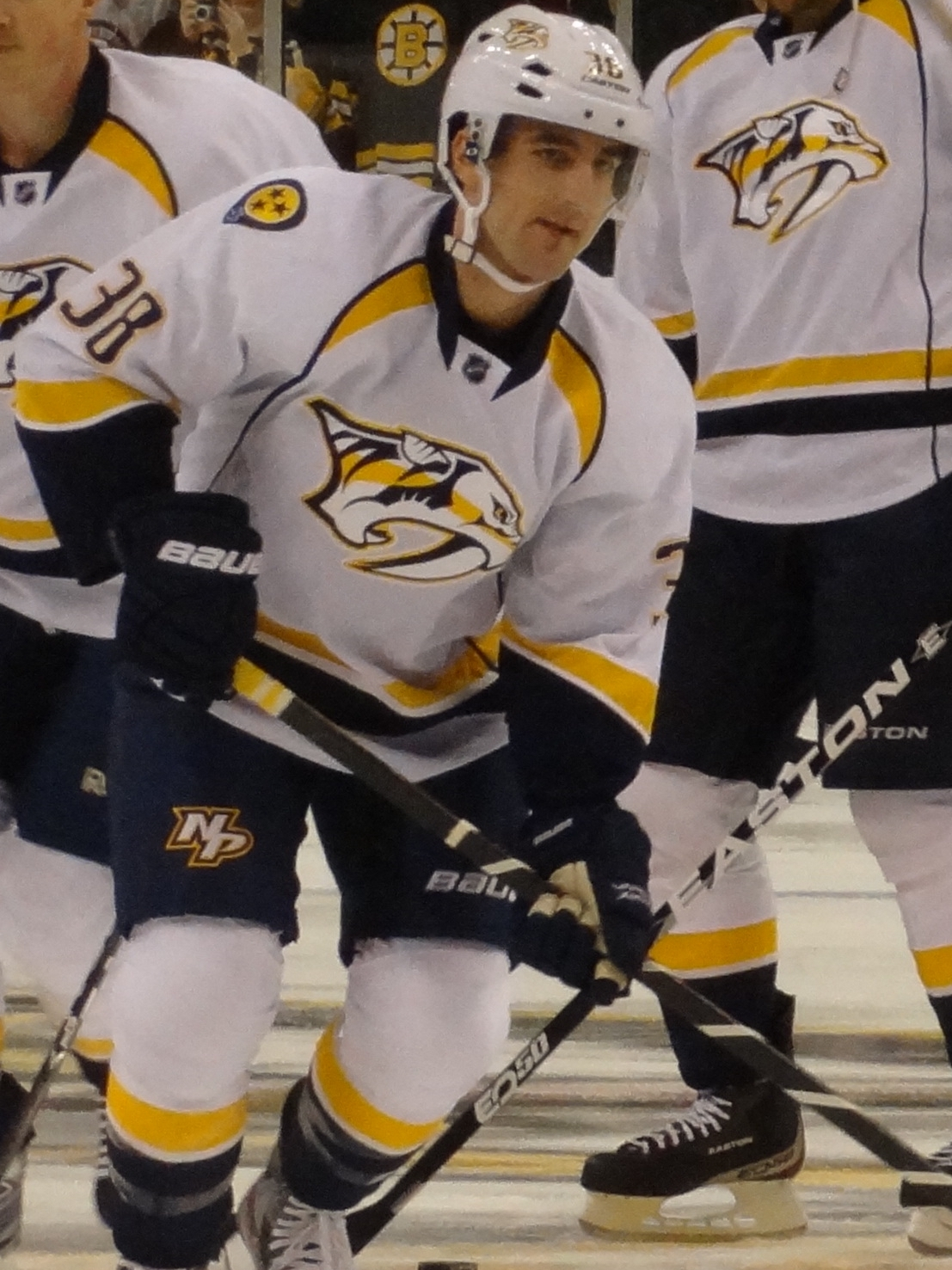
Jack Hillen

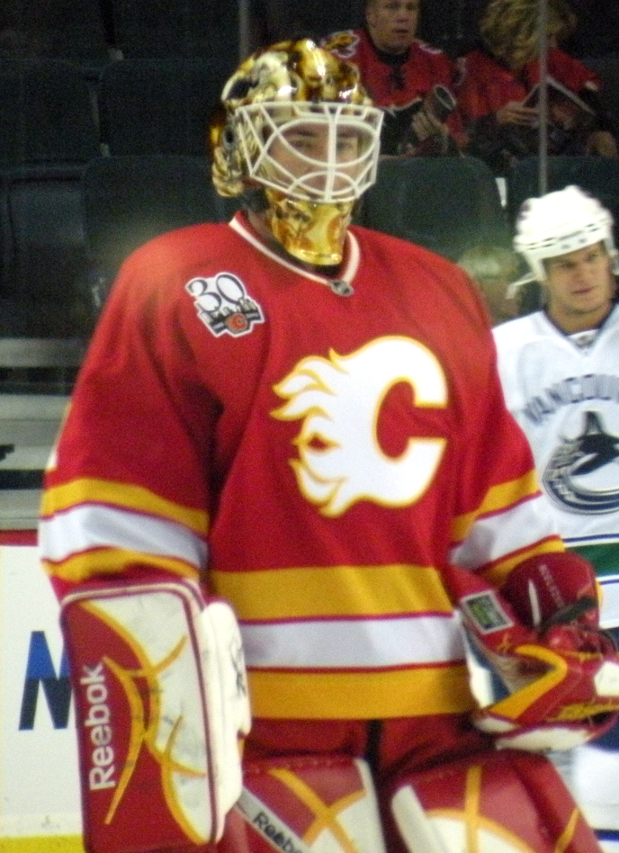
Curtis McElhinney

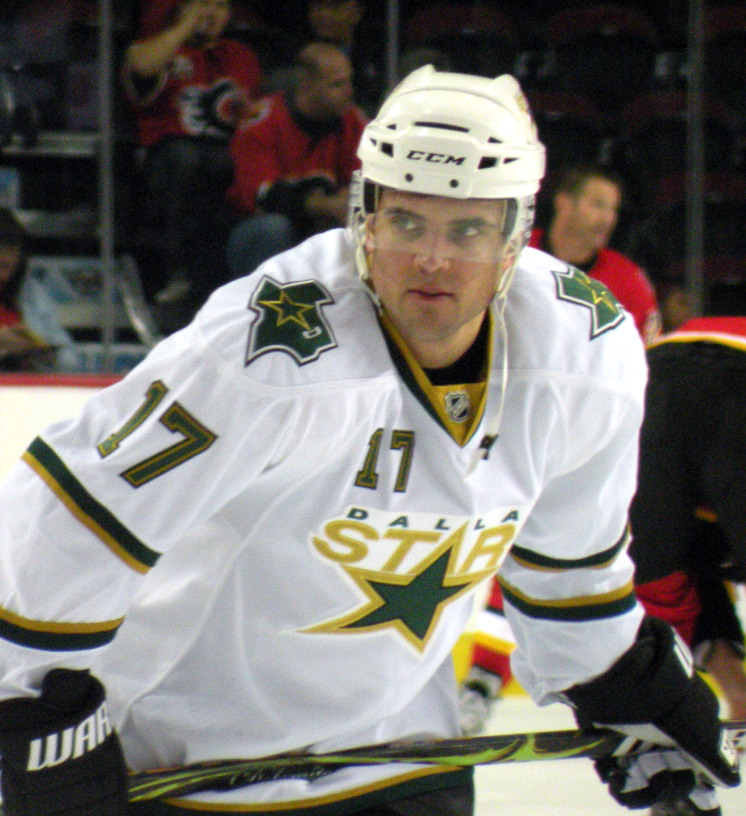
Toby Petersen

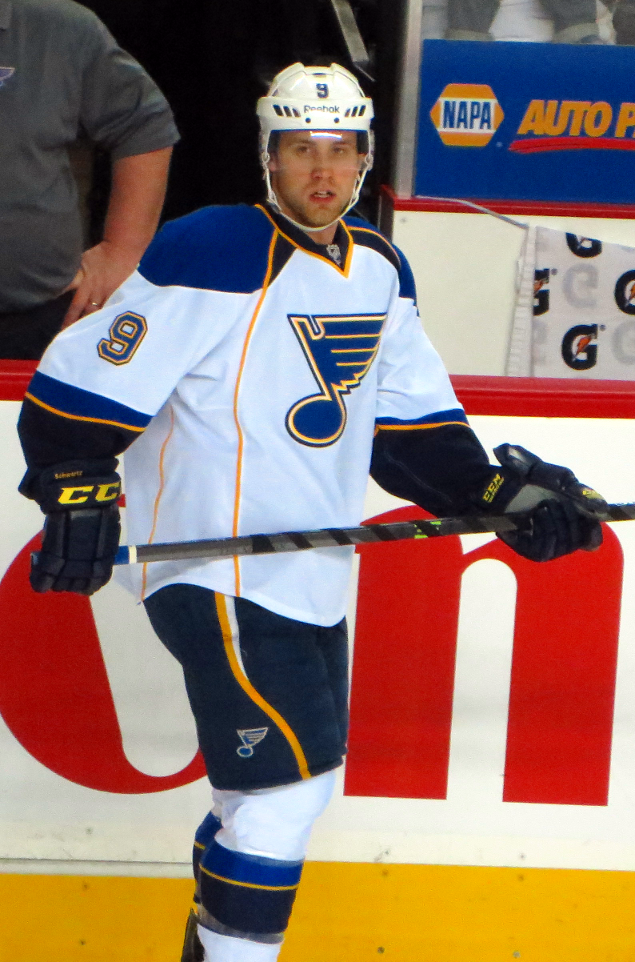
Jaden Schwartz

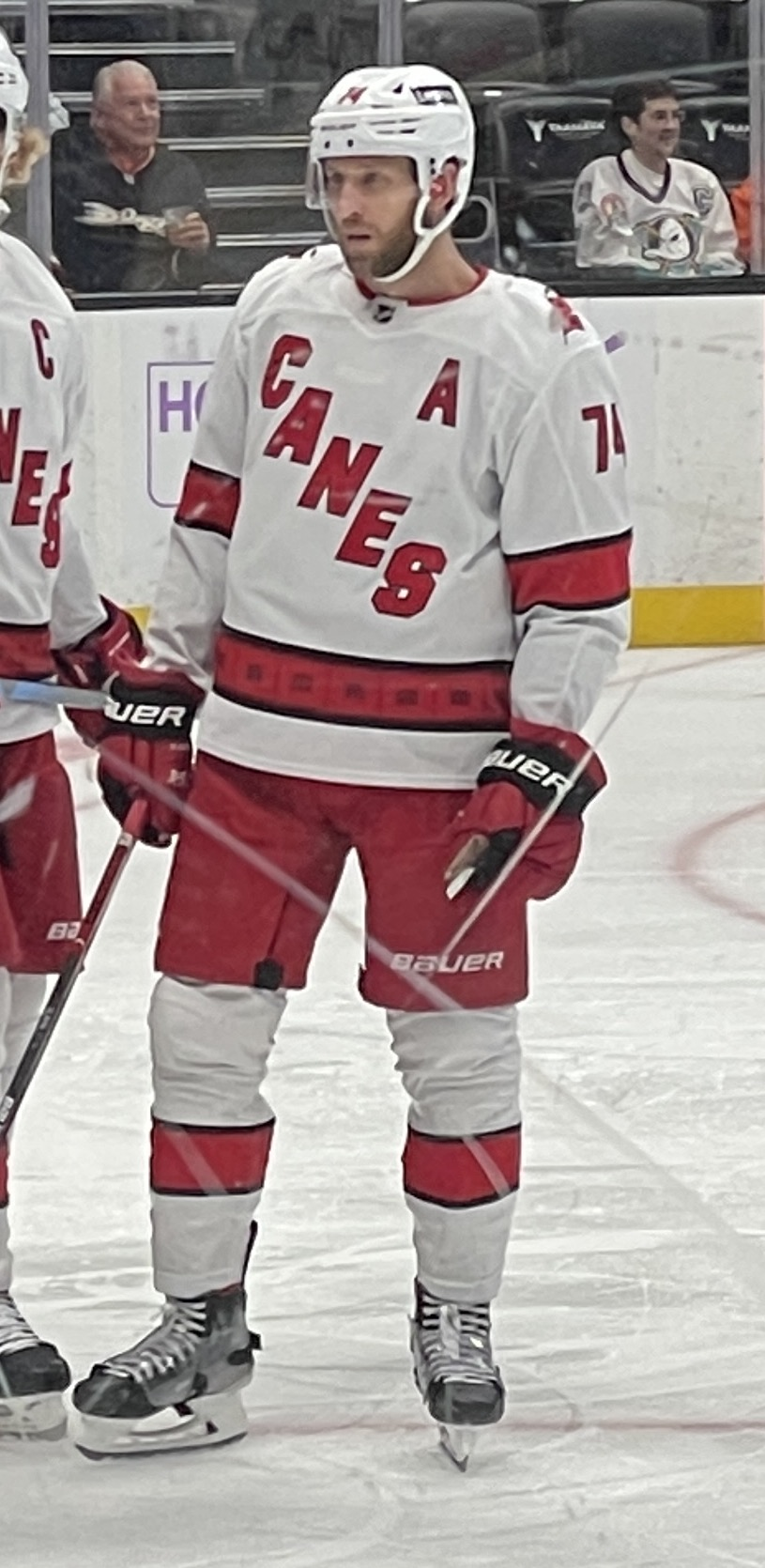
Jaccob Slavin

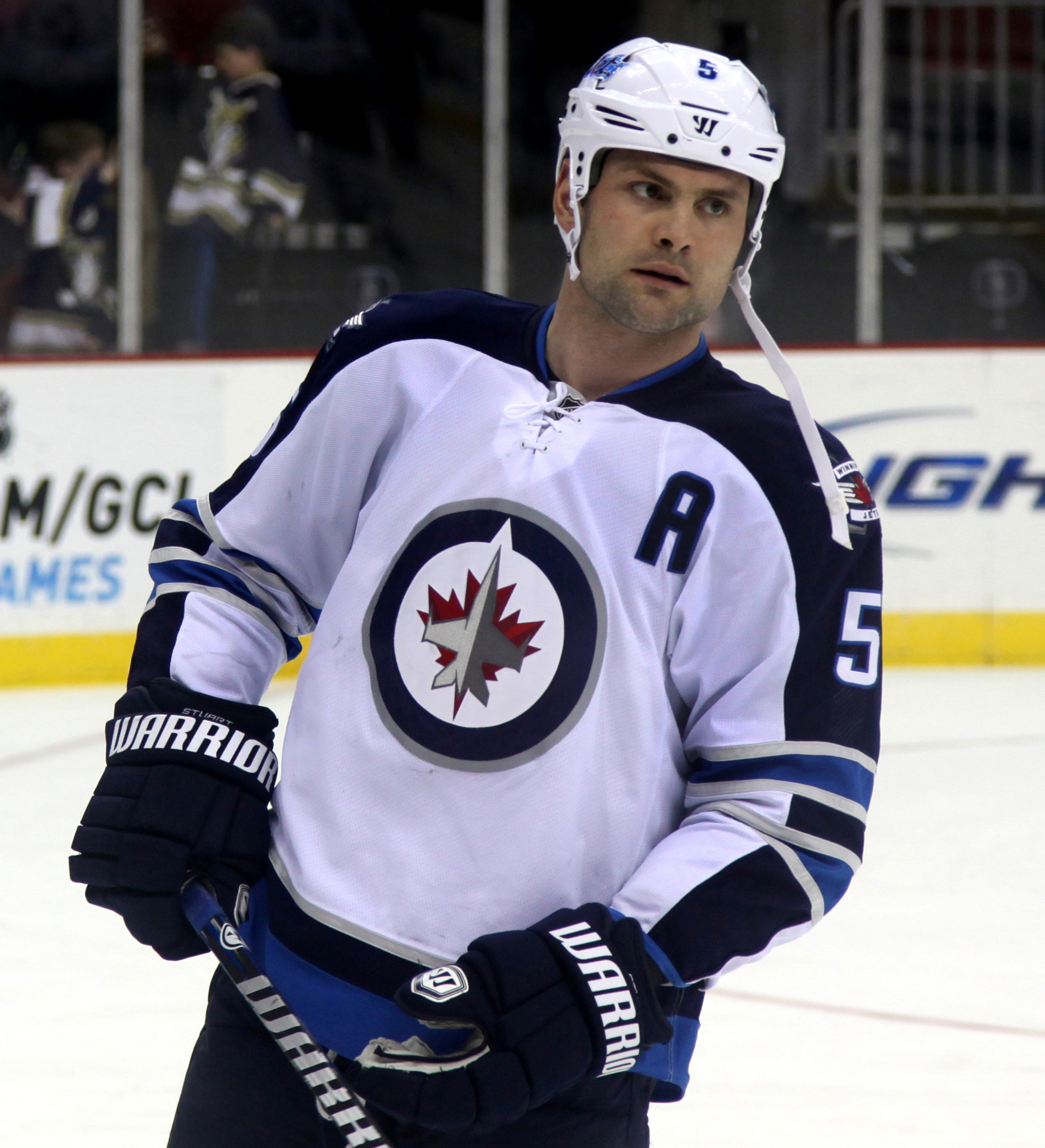
Mark Stuart

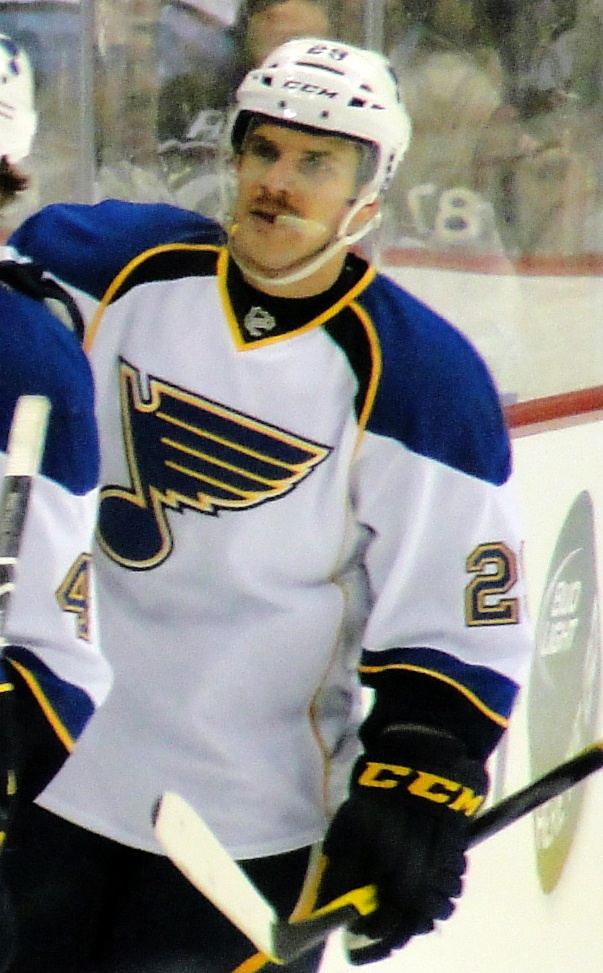
Brett Sterling

== See also ==
- Battle for the Gold Pan
- Battle for Pikes Peak
