= Dave Delich =

American ice hockey player (born 1956)

- Born: December 27, 1956 (age 69) Eveleth, Minnesota, USA
- Height: 6 ft 1 in (185 cm)
- Weight: 185 lb (84 kg; 13 st 3 lb)
- Position: Center
- Shot: Right
- Played for: Colorado College; Flint Generals; Oklahoma City Stars; Baltimore Clippers; SC Herisau
- National team: United States
- NHL draft: 93rd overall, 1976; Minnesota North Stars
- Playing career: 1975–1983

David Delich is an American former ice hockey center and real estate developer who is the all-time leading scorer for Colorado College.

== Career ==
=== Ice hockey ===
After graduating from Eveleth-Gilbert High School in 1975, Delich began attending Colorado College in the fall and swiftly became a key contributor on the school's ice hockey team. Delich led the Tigers in scoring as a freshman, being names as the WCHA Freshman of the Year for his efforts. That summer, the Minnesota North Stars selected Delich in the 6th round of the NHL draft. Unfortunately, Delich's tenure with the Tigers came during a long stretch of poor results for the program, however, during his junior year he was able to help the team reach the 1978 NCAA tournament, the program's only appearance for a 38-year span. Despite the team's overall poor performance, Delich was one of college hockey's more prolific scorers, finishing his career with 285 points in just 153 games. His totals far exceed any other player in program history with second place (Brian Swanson) being more than 50 points behind despite playing more games. Additionally, as of 2025 he sits 9th all-time in career points for all of college hockey. In spite of his gaudy totals, Delich was never named as an All-American and only appeared on the WCHA's second All-Star team.

After graduating, Delich continued his playing career by joining the US national team in the run up to the 1980 Winter Olympics. Delich played only 13 games before being cut from the squad and then signed his first professional contract. Over a three-year span, Delich played for three teams in three separate North American leagues before heading over to Europe in 1981. After a short stint in the Swiss B league, Delich returned to the states and joined the national team for a second time, posting ten points in seven games to help the US earn a promotion back to the top level at the 1983 World Championships.

Delich was inducted into the Colorado College athletic Hall of Fame in 2002.

=== Real estate ===
After finishing his playing career, Delich eventually returned to Colorado Springs and began working in real estate. He became President of Sierra Properties Inc. in 1989 and continues to serve in that capacity to this day. During that time he also served as the President for Sierra Commercial Real Estate Inc. for eleven years. In 2008, at the age of 51, Delich achieved a bit of notoriety when he qualified for the U.S. Senior Open. He was able to do this by finishing the day with 74 shots after going over par on three of the first four holes.

== Personal ==
Dave's two brothers, Chuck and Joe also played college hockey with both playing four year at Air Force. While Joe had a respectable career, Chuck is the Falcons' all-time leader in goals and points and later served as the program's head coach for 12 years.

== Statistics ==
=== Regular season and playoffs ===
			Regular Season					Playoffs
Season	Team	League	GP	G	A	Pts	PIM	GP	G	A	Pts	PIM
1975–76	Colorado College	WCHA	38	23	26	49	26	—	—	—	—	—
1976–77	Colorado College	WCHA	38	29	43	72	34	—	—	—	—	—
1977–78	Colorado College	WCHA	41	27	53	80	20	—	—	—	—	—
1978–79	Colorado College	WCHA	36	32	52	84	26	—	—	—	—	—
1979–80	Team USA	International	13	4	2	6	4	—	—	—	—	—
1979–80	Oklahoma City Stars	CHL	71	20	34	54	22	—	—	—	—	—
1979–80	Flint Generals	IHL	15	4	8	12	4	11	3	5	8	18
1980–81	Oklahoma City Stars	EHL	1	1	3	4	15	—	—	—	—	—
1980–81	Baltimore Clippers	CHL	50	12	38	50	17	3	0	1	1	4
1981–82	SC Herisau	NLB	statistics missing
NCAA totals			153	111	174	285	106	—	—	—	—	—

=== International ===
Year	Team	Event	GP	G	A	Pts	PIM
1983	United States	WC–B	7	1	9	10	–

== Awards and honors ==
Award	Year
All-WCHA Second Team	1977–78
All-WCHA Second Team	1978–79

Awards and achievements
Preceded by Jim Warner	WCHA Freshman of the Year; 1975–76	Succeeded by Mark Johnson
