= Paul Manning (ice hockey) =

Canadian ice hockey player (born 1979)

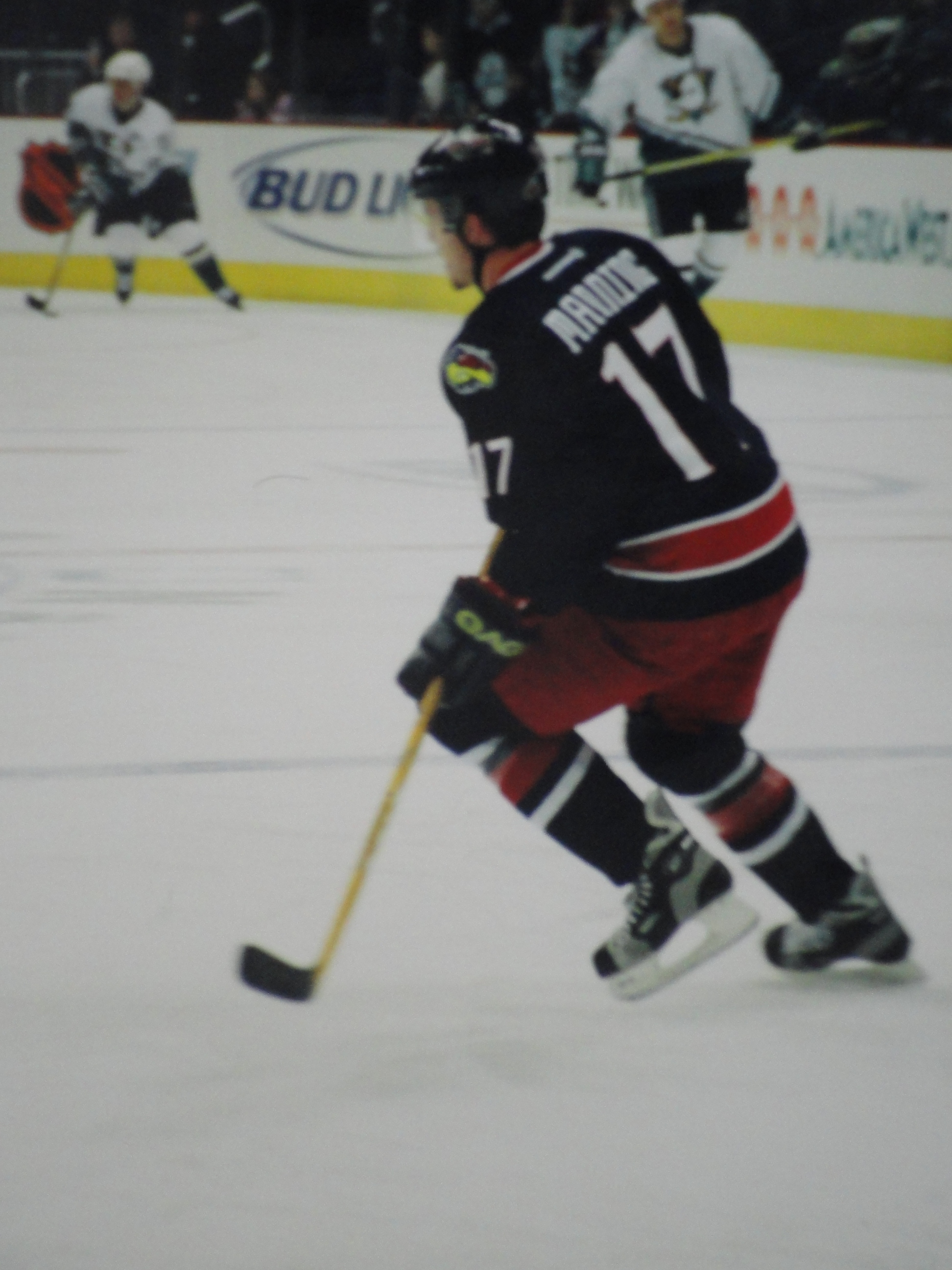
- Manning with the Columbus Blue Jackets in 2003
- Born: April 15, 1979 (age 47) Red Deer, Alberta, Canada
- Height: 6 ft 4 in (193 cm)
- Weight: 205 lb (93 kg; 14 st 9 lb)
- Position: Defence
- Shot: Left
- Played for: Columbus Blue Jackets; Syracuse Crunch; Hamburg Freezers; Hannover Scorpions
- NHL draft: 62nd overall, 1998; Calgary Flames
- Playing career: 2001–2012

Paul Manning (born April 15, 1979) is a Canadian former professional ice hockey defenceman. He played eight National Hockey League (NHL) games with the Columbus Blue Jackets during the 2002–03 season. The rest of his career, which lasted from 2001 to 2012, was mainly spent with the Hamburg Freezers of the Deutsche Eishockey Liga (DEL). He was selected by the Calgary Flames in the 3rd round (62nd overall) of the 1998 NHL entry draft.

Manning was also drafted by New York Yankees with the 619th pick in the 1997 Major League Baseball draft.

== Playing career ==
After playing four seasons of college hockey for Colorado College, Calgary traded Manning's NHL rights to the Columbus Blue Jackets for a 2001 fifth-round draft pick. He was recalled midway through his second pro season and made his NHL debut on January 4, 2003. After playing eight games, Columbus signed veteran defenseman Darren Van Impe and returned Manning to the AHL.

After the 2002–03 season, Manning was a restricted free agent but opted to continue his career in Germany, signing with the Hamburg Freezers of the Deutsche Eishockey Liga. He played seven seasons for Hamburg before moving on to the Hannover Scorpions for the final two seasons of his playing career.

Manning played for the Canadian national team at the Deutschland Cup in 2010.

== Career statistics ==
=== Regular season and playoffs ===
			Regular season					Playoffs
Season	Team	League	GP	G	A	Pts	PIM	GP	G	A	Pts	PIM
1993–94	Red Deer Rebels U15	AMBHL	30	5	19	24	18	—	—	—	—	—
1994–95	Red Deer Rebels U15	AMBHL	26	7	22	29	30	—	—	—	—	—
1995–96	Red Deer Chiefs U18	AMHL	—	—	—	—	—	—	—	—	—	—
1996–97	Red Deer Chiefs	AMHL	36	9	33	42	—	—	—	—	—	—
1997–98	Colorado College	WCHA	30	1	5	6	16	—	—	—	—	—
1998–99	Colorado College	WCHA	41	3	10	13	75	—	—	—	—	—
1999–00	Colorado College	WCHA	39	6	17	23	26	—	—	—	—	—
2000–01	Colorado College	WCHA	34	2	28	30	48	—	—	—	—	—
2001–02	Syracuse Crunch	AHL	35	1	4	5	16	—	—	—	—	—
2001–02	Elmira Jackals	UHL	1	1	0	1	0	—	—	—	—	—
2002–03	Columbus Blue Jackets	NHL	8	0	0	0	2	—	—	—	—	—
2002–03	Syracuse Crunch	AHL	52	2	5	7	37	—	—	—	—	—
2003–04	Hamburg Freezers	DEL	50	2	2	4	67	11	0	3	3	6
2004–05	Hamburg Freezers	DEL	36	4	6	10	90	6	1	0	1	10
2005–06	Hamburg Freezers	DEL	49	4	11	15	56	5	0	0	0	35
2006–07	Hamburg Freezers	DEL	47	3	5	8	22	7	1	2	3	14
2007–08	Hamburg Freezers	DEL	44	2	7	9	34	8	0	0	0	10
2008–09	Hamburg Freezers	DEL	45	2	15	17	38	9	1	2	3	10
2009–10	Hamburg Freezers	DEL	39	4	10	14	53	—	—	—	—	—
2010–11	Hannover Scorpions	DEL	50	3	10	13	57	3	0	1	1	0
2011–12	Hannover Scorpions	DEL	29	2	4	6	8	—	—	—	—	—
DEL totals			389	26	70	96	425	49	3	8	11	85
NHL totals			8	0	0	0	2	—	—	—	—	—

== Awards and honors ==
Award	Year	Ref
All-WCHA Rookie Team	1997–98	
All-WCHA Third Team	1999–00	
All-WCHA Second Team	2000–01	
