= Jay McNeill =

Canadian ice hockey player

- Born: August 28, 1972 (age 54) Powell River, British Columbia, Canada
- Height: 6 ft 0 in (183 cm)
- Weight: 182 lb (83 kg; 13 st 0 lb)
- Position: Right Wing
- Shot: Left
- Played for: Richmond Renegades; Columbus Chill; Adendorfer EC; Gelsenkirchener EC; Tilburg Trappers; Höchstadter EC; Eintracht Frankfurt
- Playing career: 1992–2009

Jay McNeill is a Canadian retired ice hockey right wing who was an All-American for Colorado College

== Career ==
McNeill was a high-scoring forward during his junior career, averaging more than a goal per game over two seasons for the Powell River Paper Kings. He finished tied for third in league scoring in 1992 and began attending Colorado College in the fall. He continued offensive pace as a freshman, clicking at over a point per game in his first year with the Tigers. McNeill was named to the conference All-Rookie team despite CC finishing last in the WCHA. The team changed coaches during the offseason and new bench boss Don Lucia brought about a immediate change to the program's fortunes. McNeill led the team in scoring as the Tigers finished atop league standings for the first time in 37 years.

As a junior, McNeill was the third highest goal-scorer in the nation and was named an All-American. He helped CC reach the NCAA Tournament for the first time in 17 years. For his final season, McNeill's point production increased for the fourth straight season, helping Colorado College win their third consecutive conference championship. McNeill's team won its first tournament games in 39 years and returned to the championship game for the first time since winning the title in 1957. Their appearance came with a bit of controversy, however, as McNeill's assist on the winning marker appeared to have been a hand pass. Because the NCAA didn't allow the use of replay at the time, the goal was allowed to stand. In the final game, McNeill was held off the scoresheet and the Tigers lost in overtime to Michigan, coincidentally, the same team CC had defeated back in '57.

After graduating, McNeill began his professional career in the ECHL. While he continued to produce points, he didn't receive much interest from AAA teams and headed to Europe in 1998. He spent most of the next decade playing in the lower German leagues, scoring at an incredible pace. In the early '00s, he spent most of three years playing with the Tilburg Trappers and helped the team win the Dutch league championship in 2001. McNeill retired in 2009.

== Statistics ==
=== Regular season and playoffs ===
			Regular Season					Playoffs
Season	Team	League	GP	G	A	Pts	PIM	GP	G	A	Pts	PIM
1990–91	Powell River Paper Kings	BCJHL	60	59	48	107	77	—	—	—	—	—
1991–92	Powell River Paper Kings	BCJHL	60	63	66	129	122	—	—	—	—	—
1992–93	Colorado College	WCHA	36	18	21	39	80	—	—	—	—	—
1993–94	Colorado College	WCHA	37	25	19	44	30	—	—	—	—	—
1994–95	Colorado College	WCHA	43	33	18	51	70	—	—	—	—	—
1995–96	Colorado College	WCHA	42	24	31	55	53	—	—	—	—	—
1996–97	Richmond Renegades	ECHL	68	25	29	54	42	8	4	3	7	2
1997–98	Richmond Renegades	ECHL	15	6	7	13	10	—	—	—	—	—
1997–98	Columbus Chill	ECHL	44	12	22	34	31	—	—	—	—	—
1998–99	Adendorfer EC	Oberliga	34	20	26	46	30	18	15	11	26	10
1999–00	Gelsenkirchener EC	Oberliga	59	54	44	98	109	—	—	—	—	—
2000–01	Gelsenkirchener EC	Oberliga	6	4	1	5	4	—	—	—	—	—
2000–01	Tilburg Trappers	Eredivisie	24	15	35	50	20	9	6	6	12	8
2001–02	Tilburg Trappers	Eredivisie	24	16	13	29	36	4	0	2	2	8
2002–03	Tilburg Trappers	Eredivisie	24	16	14	30	24	5	1	4	5	4
2003–04	Höchstadter EC	Oberliga	4	0	1	1	0	—	—	—	—	—
2003–04	Eintracht Frankfurt	Regionalliga	6	14	10	24	12	—	—	—	—	—
2004–05	Eintracht Frankfurt	Regionalliga	18	66	51	117	24	—	—	—	—	—
2005–06	Eintracht Frankfurt	Regionalliga	17	40	29	69	8	—	—	—	—	—
2006–07	Eintracht Frankfurt	Regionalliga	—	—	—	—	—	—	—	—	—	—
2007–08	Eintracht Frankfurt	Regionalliga	—	—	—	—	—	—	—	—	—	—
2008–09	Eintracht Frankfurt	Regionalliga	3	9	5	14	0	—	—	—	—	—
BCJHL totals			120	122	114	236	199	—	—	—	—	—
NCAA totals			158	100	89	189	233	—	—	—	—	—
ECHL totals			127	43	58	101	83	8	4	3	7	2
Oberliga totals			103	78	72	150	143	18	15	11	26	10
Eredivisie totals			72	47	62	109	80	18	7	12	19	20

== Awards and honors ==
Award	Year
All-WCHA Rookie Team	1992–93
All-WCHA First Team	1993–94
All-WCHA First Team	1994–95
AHCA West Second-Team All-American	1994–95
All-WCHA Third Team	1995–96
