= Rainer Köttstorfer =

German ice hockey player

- Born: 2 August 1981 (age 43); Rosenheim, West Germany
- Height: 6 ft 6 in (198 cm)
- Weight: 227 lb (103 kg; 16 st 3 lb)
- Position: Defence
- Shot: Left
- Played for: Schwenninger Wild Wings; Krefeld Pinguine; Hannover Scorpions; Hamburg Freezers; Grizzly Adams Wolfsburg
- Playing career: 1999–2013

Rainer Köttstorfer (born 2 August 1981) is a former German professional ice hockey defenceman. He most recently played for Grizzly Adams Wolfsburg of the Deutsche Eishockey Liga (DEL).

On 9 February 2011, Köttstorfer signed a one-year extension with the Hamburg Freezers to remain through to the 2011–12 season. Upon completion of the season and as a free agent, Rainer signed a one-year contract with Grizzly Adams Wolfsburg on July 10, 2012. He only played 7 games before he retired as a result of an injury.

== Career statistics ==
=== Regular season and playoffs ===
			Regular season					Playoffs
Season	Team	League	GP	G	A	Pts	PIM	GP	G	A	Pts	PIM
1999–00	Mannheimer ERC	3.GBun	41	7	7	14	20	—	—	—	—	—
2002–03	Schwenninger Wild Wings	DEL	48	1	2	3	18	—	—	—	—	—
2003–04	Krefeld Pinguine	DEL	2	0	1	1	0	—	—	—	—	—
2003–04	EV Duisburg	2.GBun	49	8	14	22	50	4	1	1	2	2
2004–05	Krefeld Pinguine	DEL	50	0	3	3	36	—	—	—	—	—
2004–05	EV Duisburg	2.GBun	1	1	0	1	2	12	2	3	5	18
2005–06	Krefeld Pinguine	DEL	40	1	5	6	66	4	0	1	1	6
2006–07	Krefeld Pinguine	DEL	48	5	7	12	68	2	0	1	1	2
2007–08	Hannover Scorpions	DEL	38	4	4	8	24	3	1	0	1	0
2008–09	Hannover Scorpions	DEL	35	5	8	13	34	7	1	1	2	4
2009–10	Hannover Scorpions	DEL	50	4	10	14	46	11	2	1	3	4
2010–11	Hamburg Freezers	DEL	48	8	17	25	24	—	—	—	—	—
2011–12	Hamburg Freezers	DEL	49	2	7	9	18	5	0	1	1	2
2012–13	Grizzly Adams Wolfsburg	DEL	7	1	0	1	4	—	—	—	—	—
DEL totals			415	31	64	95	338	32	4	5	9	18

=== International ===
Year	Team	Comp	GP	G	A	Pts	PIM
1999	Germany	WJC18	6	0	0	0	6
Junior int'l totals			6	0	0	0	6
