= Calvin Elfring =

Canadian ice hockey player

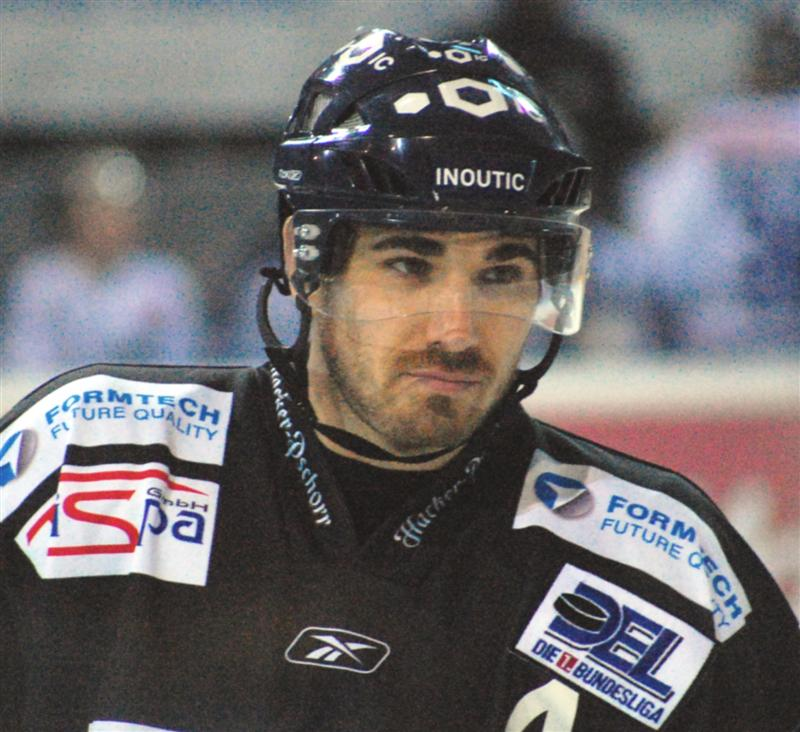
- Born: April 23, 1976 (age 50) Lethbridge, Alberta, Canada
- Height: 6 ft 0 in (183 cm)
- Weight: 170 lb (77 kg; 12 st 2 lb)
- Position: Defence
- Shot: Left
- EIHL team Former teams: none Hershey Bears; Cincinnati Mighty Ducks; Lowell Lock Monsters; Utah Grizzlies; Straubing Tigers; Belfast Giants
- NHL draft: 165th overall, 1994; Quebec Nordiques
- Playing career: 1998–2015

Calvin Elfring (born April 23, 1976) is a Canadian former professional ice hockey defenceman. He was originally selected by the Quebec Nordiques in the seventh round (165th overall) of the 1994 NHL entry draft. He played predominantly for Straubing Tigers in the 2nd Bundesliga and the Deutsche Eishockey Liga (DEL) from 2004 to 2013.

== Career statistics ==
			Regular season					Playoffs
Season	Team	League	GP	G	A	Pts	PIM	GP	G	A	Pts	PIM
1991–92	Lethbridge Hawks Btm AAA	AMBHL	31	8	23	31	41	—	—	—	—	—
1993–94	Powell River Paper Kings	BCJHL	58	21	45	66	80	—	—	—	—	—
1994–95	Colorado College	NCAA	43	3	23	26	34	—	—	—	—	—
1995–96	Colorado College	NCAA	42	10	24	34	32	—	—	—	—	—
1996–97	Colorado College	NCAA	44	9	22	31	26	—	—	—	—	—
1997–98	Colorado College	NCAA	42	10	26	36	51	—	—	—	—	—
1998–99	Pee Dee Pride	ECHL	10	1	2	3	14	—	—	—	—	—
1998–99	Roanoke Express	ECHL	40	8	16	24	41	11	3	5	8	10
1998–99	Hershey Bears	AHL	7	1	1	2	0	—	—	—	—	—
1998–99	Cincinnati Mighty Ducks	AHL	4	0	0	0	0	—	—	—	—	—
1999–00	Roanoke Express	ECHL	63	6	40	46	92	4	1	0	1	6
1999–00	Lowell Lock Monsters	AHL	4	0	1	1	2	—	—	—	—	—
1999–00	Utah Grizzlies	IHL	3	0	2	2	0	—	—	—	—	—
2000–01	Roanoke Express	ECHL	70	16	37	53	79	5	0	2	2	0
2001–02	EHC Bad Aibling	Germany3	52	21	26	47	56	—	—	—	—	—
2002–03	SC Bietigheim-Bissingen	Germany2	56	19	49	68	54	7	2	3	5	4
2003–04	Bietigheim Steelers	Germany2	50	13	48	61	58	8	5	3	8	6
2004–05	Straubing Tigers	Germany2	45	13	29	42	30	13	5	5	10	10
2005–06	Straubing Tigers	Germany2	51	16	20	36	36	15	8	4	12	12
2006–07	Straubing Tigers	DEL	41	9	14	23	40	—	—	—	—	—
2007–08	Straubing Tigers	DEL	56	9	18	27	50	—	—	—	—	—
2008–09	Straubing Tigers	DEL	51	10	13	23	36	—	—	—	—	—
2009–10	Straubing Tigers	DEL	51	8	15	23	36	—	—	—	—	—
2010–11	Straubing Tigers	DEL	52	5	19	24	32	—	—	—	—	—
2011–12	Straubing Tigers	DEL	45	6	13	19	16	8	2	4	6	2
2012–13	Straubing Tigers	DEL	40	4	13	17	73	2	0	0	0	0
2013–14	Belfast Giants	EIHL	52	12	32	44	40	4	0	2	2	0
2014–15	Belfast Giants	EIHL	50	4	19	23	45	4	0	1	1	0
AHL totals			15	1	2	3	2	—	—	—	—	—
DEL totals			336	51	105	156	283	10	2	4	6	2

== Awards and honours ==
Award	Year
All-WCHA Rookie Team	1994–95
All-WCHA Third Team	1996–97
All-WCHA Second Team	1997–98
AHCA West Second-Team All-American	1997–98
