= Jim Warner =

American ice hockey player

- Born: March 26, 1954 (age 71) St. Paul, Minnesota, United States
- Height: 5 ft 11 in (180 cm)
- Weight: 181 lb (82 kg; 12 st 13 lb)
- Position: Right wing
- Shot: Right
- Played for: Hartford Whalers; New England Whalers
- National team: United States
- NHL draft: 245th overall, 1974; New York Rangers
- Playing career: 1978–1980

James Francis Warner (born March 26, 1954, in Saint Paul, Minnesota) is an American retired professional ice hockey forward who played 32 National Hockey League regular season games with the Hartford Whalers in 1979–80. Warner was originally drafted by the New York Rangers in the 1974 NHL amateur draft but he chose instead to sign a free agent contract with the New England Whalers of the rival World Hockey Association in 1978. He appeared in 41 WHA regular season games with the Whalers in 1978–79 and was retained by the club when the NHL and WHA merged in 1979.

Before turning professional, Warner played for the Colorado College men's ice hockey team. He was also a member of the American national team at the 1975, 1976 and 1978 World Championships.

== Career statistics ==
=== Regular season and playoffs ===
			Regular season					Playoffs
Season	Team	League	GP	G	A	Pts	PIM	GP	G	A	Pts	PIM
1970–71	Saint Thomas Academy	HS-MN	—	—	—	—	—	—	—	—	—	—
1971–72	Saint Thomas Academy	HS-MN	—	—	—	—	—	—	—	—	—	—
1972–73	Minnesota Junior Stars	MWJHL	56	21	17	38	22	—	—	—	—	—
1973–74	Minnesota Junior Stars	MWJHL	56	55	50	105	47	—	—	—	—	—
1974–75	Colorado College	WCHA	37	30	25	55	24	—	—	—	—	—
1975–76	Colorado College	WCHA	35	16	20	36	59	—	—	—	—	—
1976–77	Colorado College	WCHA	30	16	23	39	36	—	—	—	—	—
1977–78	Colorado College	WCHA	38	27	41	68	50	—	—	—	—	—
1978–79	New England Whalers	WHA	41	6	9	15	20	1	0	0	0	0
1978–79	Springfield Indians	AHL	40	17	7	24	15	—	—	—	—	—
1979–80	Hartford Whalers	NHL	32	0	3	3	10	—	—	—	—	—
1979–80	Springfield Indians	AHL	45	14	19	33	22	—	—	—	—	—
WHA totals			41	6	9	15	20	1	0	0	0	0
NHL totals			32	0	3	3	10	—	—	—	—	—

=== International ===
Year	Team	Event	GP	G	A	Pts	PIM
1974	United States	WJC	5	3	1	4	2
1975	United States	WC	10	1	4	5	8
1976	United States	WC	10	2	2	4	12
1978	United States	WC	10	2	5	7	2
Junior totals			5	3	1	4	2
Senior totals			30	5	11	16	22

== Awards and honors ==
Award	Year
All-WCHA Second Team	1974–75

Awards and achievements
Preceded by Brian Walsh	WCHA Freshman of the Year; 1974–75	Succeeded by Dave Delich
