= Shawn Reid =

Canadian ice hockey player

- Born: September 21, 1970 (age 55) Toronto, Ontario, Canada
- Height: 6 ft 1 in (185 cm)
- Weight: 194 lb (88 kg; 13 st 12 lb)
- Position: Defenseman
- Shot: Left
- Played for: Colorado College; Binghamton Rangers; Fort Wayne Komets; Charlotte Checkers; San Antonio Dragons; Tallahassee Tiger Sharks; Richmond Renegades; Grand Rapids Griffins; Chicago Wolves
- Playing career: 1990–1998

Shawn Reid (born September 21, 1970) is a Canadian retired ice hockey defenseman who was an All-American for Colorado College.

== Career ==
Reid began his college career in 1990, playing for Colorado College under Brad Buetow. While the team was fairly underwhelming that year, Reid led CC's defense with 10 goals. The team improved greatly the following year, producing its first non-losing season in a dozen years while Reid nearly doubled his point total. In Reid's junior year his scoring production declined drastically, mirroring the team's success on the ice. CC finished last in the WCHA but the news for his head coach got even worse. Buetow was charged with recruiting violations and eventually fired. He was replaced by Don Lucia and the change behind the bench brought CC newfound success; the team finished atop the WCHA standings for the first time in program history. Reid's scoring recovered and, though he didn't produce as much as he had as a sophomore, his overall performance led him to be named a first team All-American, the first for Colorado College in over a decade.

Reid embarked on a professional career after graduating, signing with the Binghamton Rangers. Over four years, Reid bounced between several teams across three leagues in North America. He was a solid contributor at most of his stops but Reid was unable to earn a promotion above the AAA level. After playing for 4 separate teams in 1998, Reid ended his hockey career.

== Statistics ==
=== Regular season and playoffs ===
			Regular Season					Playoffs
Season	Team	League	GP	G	A	Pts	PIM	GP	G	A	Pts	PIM
1987–88	Henry Carr Crusaders	MetJHL	2	0	1	1	0	—	—	—	—	—
1989–90	Henry Carr Crusaders	MetJHL	35	11	18	29	64	—	—	—	—	—
1990–91	Colorado College	WCHA	38	10	8	18	36	—	—	—	—	—
1991–92	Colorado College	WCHA	41	12	22	34	64	—	—	—	—	—
1992–93	Colorado College	WCHA	31	3	11	14	54	—	—	—	—	—
1993–94	Colorado College	WCHA	39	7	20	27	28	—	—	—	—	—
1994–95	Binghamton Rangers	AHL	18	3	4	7	8	9	0	3	3	6
1994–95	Fort Wayne Komets	IHL	42	4	8	12	28	—	—	—	—	—
1995–96	Carolina Monarchs	AHL	45	0	5	5	33	1	0	0	0	0
1995–96	Charlotte Checkers	ECHL	6	1	5	6	10	—	—	—	—	—
1996–97	San Antonio Dragons	IHL	39	4	7	11	12	5	0	1	1	2
1997–98	Tallahassee Tiger Sharks	ECHL	56	8	28	36	55	—	—	—	—	—
1997–98	Richmond Renegades	ECHL	13	3	6	9	4	—	—	—	—	—
1997–98	Grand Rapids Griffins	IHL	2	0	0	0	2	—	—	—	—	—
1997–98	Chicago Wolves	IHL	3	0	0	0	2	—	—	—	—	—
NCAA totals			149	32	61	93	182	—	—	—	—	—
AHL totals			63	3	9	12	41	10	0	3	3	6
IHL totals			86	8	15	23	44	5	0	1	1	2
ECHL totals			75	12	39	51	69	—	—	—	—	—

== Awards and honors ==
Award	Year
All-WCHA Rookie Team	1990–91
All-WCHA First Team	1993–94
AHCA West First-Team All-American	1993–94

Awards and achievements
Preceded by Chris Hynnes	WCHA Defensive Player of the Year; 1993–94	Succeeded by Brian Rafalski
