= Kent Fearns =

Canadian ice hockey player (born 1972)

- Born: September 13, 1972 (age 53) Langley, British Columbia, Canada
- Height: 6 ft 0 in (183 cm)
- Weight: 190 lb (86 kg; 13 st 8 lb)
- Position: Defence
- Shot: Left
- Played for: Cape Breton Oilers; Knoxville Cherokees; Flint Generals; Las Vegas Thunder; Manitoba Moose; Munich Barons; ERC Ingolstadt; Hamburg Freezers; EC KAC
- NHL draft: 1993 NHL Supplemental Draft; Hartford Whalers
- Playing career: 1991–2005

Kent Fearns (born September 13, 1972) is a Canadian former professional ice hockey defenseman who was an All-American for Colorado College

== Career ==
Fearns joined the ice hockey program at Colorado College in 1991 after helping the Chilliwack Chiefs win a regular season title. He was nearly a point per game player for the Tigers and named to the WCHA all-Rookie team. Fearns helped CC post its first non-losing season since 1980 and its first postseason game in five years. The team's success couldn't be sustained, however, and the Tigers finished last in the conference in 1993. Don Lucia was brought in as head coach for Fearns' junior season and the change in leadership brought about an incredible turnaround. CC won its first regular season title in 37 years and posted the best record since winning the national championship in 1957. The renaissance for the program continued the following year and Fearns helped CC win back-to-back conference titles for the first time in program history. He was named an All-American as CC won 30 games for the first time and reached the NCAA Tournament for the first time since 1978.

With his college career over, Fearns signed a professional contract the following year and slowly worked his way up to the top level of the minor leagues. After more than two years with the Manitoba Moose and no callups to the NHL on the horizon, Fearns headed to Europe. His first year with the Munich Barons saw the team with the DEL championship. After finishing as runner-ups the following year, the team's finances became problematic. Fearns remained with the club until 2002 and then spent a season with ERC Ingolstadt. In 2003 he returned to his previous franchise, which had now relocated to Hamburg and then ended his playing career with EC KAC.

== Statistics ==
=== Regular season and playoffs ===
			Regular Season					Playoffs
Season	Team	League	GP	G	A	Pts	PIM	GP	G	A	Pts	PIM
1988–89	Richmond Sockeyes	BCJHL	5	0	1	1	0	—	—	—	—	—
1989–90	Richmond Sockeyes	BCJHL	53	6	13	19	41	—	—	—	—	—
1990–91	Chilliwack Chiefs	BCJHL	57	10	26	36	101	—	—	—	—	—
1991–92	Colorado College	WCHA	41	10	27	37	48	—	—	—	—	—
1992–93	Colorado College	WCHA	33	7	15	22	76	—	—	—	—	—
1993–94	Colorado College	WCHA	39	11	19	30	62	—	—	—	—	—
1994–95	Colorado College	WCHA	40	7	23	30	39	—	—	—	—	—
1995–96	Cape Breton Oilers	AHL	6	0	0	0	4	—	—	—	—	—
1995–96	Flint Generals	CoHL	24	5	6	11	23	—	—	—	—	—
1995–96	Knoxville Cherokees	ECHL	21	1	8	9	24	8	1	5	6	6
1996–97	Knoxville Cherokees	ECHL	37	11	21	32	37	—	—	—	—	—
1996–97	Las Vegas Thunder	IHL	21	3	8	11	6	—	—	—	—	—
1996–97	Manitoba Moose	IHL	10	1	4	5	6	—	—	—	—	—
1997–98	Manitoba Moose	IHL	65	10	23	33	32	3	0	0	0	2
1998–99	Manitoba Moose	IHL	66	14	27	41	66	5	1	5	6	8
1999–00	Munich Barons	DEL	48	10	16	26	46	12	5	3	8	8
2000–01	Munich Barons	DEL	53	5	21	26	53	11	2	3	5	22
2001–02	Munich Barons	DEL	19	3	8	11	14	9	1	4	5	8
2002–03	ERC Ingolstadt	DEL	49	4	10	14	90	—	—	—	—	—
2003–04	Hamburg Freezers	DEL	51	4	16	20	50	11	1	3	4	8
2004–05	EC KAC	Austria	46	10	17	27	72	12	2	1	3	22
BCJHL totals			115	16	40	56	142	—	—	—	—	—
NCAA totals			153	35	84	119	225	—	—	—	—	—
ECHL totals			58	12	29	41	61	8	1	5	6	6
IHL totals			162	28	62	90	110	8	1	5	6	10
DEL totals			220	26	71	97	253	43	9	13	22	46

== Awards and honors ==
Award	Year
All-WCHA Rookie Team	1991–92
All-WCHA Second Team	1993–94
All-WCHA Second Team	1994–95
AHCA West Second-Team All-American	1994–95
