= Chris Hynnes =

Canadian ice hockey player

- Born: August 12, 1970 (age 54); Thunder Bay, Ontario, Canada
- Height: 6 ft 0 in (183 cm)
- Weight: 209 lb (95 kg; 14 st 13 lb)
- Position: Defence
- Shot: Left
- Played for: Colorado College; Thunder Bay Senators; Minnesota Moose; Prince Edward Island Senators; South Carolina Stingrays; Portland Pirates; Rochester Americans; Frankfurt Lions
- NHL draft: 1991 NHL Supplemental Draft; Quebec Nordiques
- Playing career: 1989–2001

Chris Hynnes (born August 12, 1970) is a Canadian former professional ice hockey defenseman who was an All-American for Colorado College and led the South Carolina Stingrays to a Kelly Cup championship in 1997.

== Career ==
Hynnes began his college career in 1989 and played sparingly as a freshman. His ice time and production increased significantly beginning with his sophomore season and he continued to grow as a junior, being named an All-American while scoring at a more than point-per-game pace. Despite Hynnes' efforts, Colorado College didn't achieve much success during his time with the team. The Tigers never finished above .500 and missed the NCAA tournament each year.

After graduating, Hynnes began his professional career in one of the lowest leagues in North America, the Colonial Hockey League. He was able to make a name for himself fairly quickly, scoring nearly a point-per-game in his first season as a pro and helping the Thunder Bay Senators win the league championship. The following season he got a shot at AAA hockey, playing more than half the season at the top level of the minor leagues. His production, however, never materialized and he was returned to Thunder Bay where he won a second championship. After helping the Senators to a third consecutive finals appearance (finishing as runners-up in 1996), Hynnes moved over to the ECHL and continued to play well with the South Carolina Stingrays. In his first season with the team he led South Carolina in postseason scoring and helped the club win its first Kelly Cup.

Hynnes spent two more seasons with the Stingrays before plying his trade in Europe. After two fairly disappointing seasons with the Frankfurt Lions, Hynnes retired from the game.

== Statistics ==
=== Regular season and playoffs ===
			Regular Season					Playoffs
Season	Team	League	GP	G	A	Pts	PIM	GP	G	A	Pts	PIM
1987–88	Volunteer Pool Bearcats	U18 AA	—	—	—	—	—	—	—	—	—	—
1988–89	Thunder Bay Flyers	USHL	—	—	—	—	—	—	—	—	—	—
1989–90	Colorado College	WCHA	17	0	3	3	10	—	—	—	—	—
1990–91	Colorado College	WCHA	40	8	18	26	64	—	—	—	—	—
1991–92	Colorado College	WCHA	40	12	31	43	59	—	—	—	—	—
1992–93	Colorado College	WCHA	36	8	18	26	68	—	—	—	—	—
1993–94	Thunder Bay Senators	CoHL	59	13	40	53	45	9	2	6	8	6
1994–95	Minnesota Moose	IHL	25	3	4	7	22	—	—	—	—	—
1994–95	Prince Edward Island Senators	AHL	14	0	1	1	4	—	—	—	—	—
1994–95	Thunder Bay Senators	CoHL	16	6	9	15	10	8	1	4	5	10
1995–96	Thunder Bay Senators	CoHL	73	26	47	73	96	19	4	17	21	32
1996–97	South Carolina Stingrays	ECHL	68	22	33	55	86	18	11	16	27	44
1997–98	South Carolina Stingrays	ECHL	70	19	39	58	48	5	4	0	4	10
1997–98	Portland Pirates	AHL	—	—	—	—	—	1	0	1	1	0
1998–99	South Carolina Stingrays	ECHL	70	19	29	48	77	3	0	2	2	2
1998–99	Rochester Americans	AHL	1	0	0	0	0	—	—	—	—	—
1999–00	Frankfurt Lions	DEL	50	3	4	7	30	5	1	1	2	8
2000–01	Frankfurt Lions	DEL	60	6	5	11	54	—	—	—	—	—
NCAA totals			133	28	70	98	201	—	—	—	—	—
CoHL totals			148	45	96	141	151	36	7	27	34	48
ECHL totals			208	60	101	161	211	26	15	18	33	56
AHL totals			15	0	1	1	4	1	0	1	1	0
DEL totals			110	9	9	18	84	5	1	1	2	8

== Awards and honors ==
Award	Year
All-WCHA First Team	1991–92
AHCA West Second-Team All-American	1991–92
ECHL Second-Team All-Star	1996–97
ECHL First-Team All-Star	1997–98

Awards and achievements
Preceded by Dallas Drake	WCHA Defensive Player of the Year; 1992–93	Succeeded by Shawn Reid
