= Joe Slattery =

Canadian ice hockey player

- Born: Sutherland, Saskatchewan, Canada
- Position: Left Wing
- Played for: Colorado College
- Playing career: 1946–1949

Joe Slattery is a former ice hockey winger who played for Colorado College in the 1940s.

== Career ==
Slattery made the Tigers' varsity squad just in time for their first full season since the end of World War II. His scoring punch helped the Tigers become one of the more dominant teams of the era, finishing with records of above 0.650 in each of his three seasons. Slattery's breakout year happened in 1947–48 when he led the team with 38 goals and was selected as one of the inaugural AHCA First Team All-Americans. He did not lead the team in scoring until the following year, however, when he posted 25 goals and 25 assists and was honored with his second All-American selection. Slattery's team records did not stand for long as nearly all of his scoring milestones were surpassed by Ron Hartwell.

== Statistics ==
=== Regular season and playoffs ===
			Regular season					Playoffs
Season	Team	League	GP	G	A	Pts	PIM	GP	G	A	Pts	PIM
1946–47	Colorado College	NCAA	19	18	—	—	—	—	—	—	—	—
1947–48	Colorado College	NCAA	27	38	—	—	—	—	—	—	—	—
1948–49	Colorado College	NCAA	23	25	25	50	—	—	—	—	—	—
NCAA totals			69	81	49	130	—	—	—	—	—	—

== Awards and honors ==
Award	Year
AHCA First Team All-American	1947–48
NCAA All-Tournament Second Team	1948
AHCA First Team All-American	1948–49
