= Brian Swanson =

American ice hockey player (born 1976)

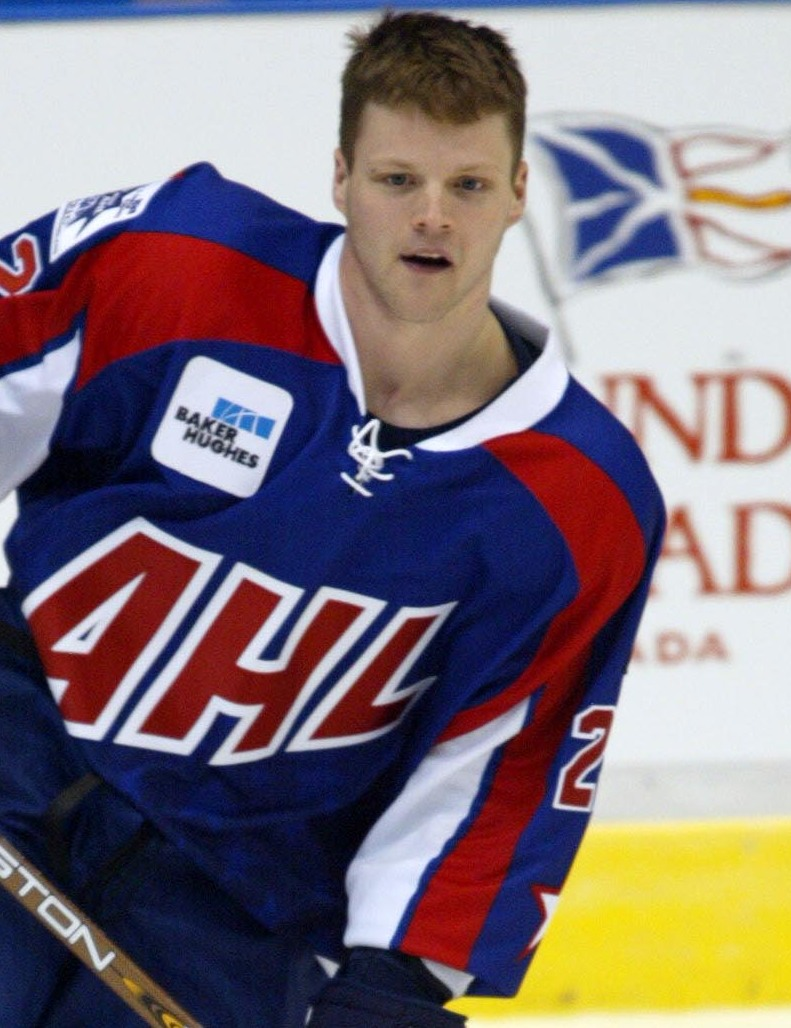
- Born: March 24, 1976 (age 50) Eagle River, Alaska, U.S.
- Height: 5 ft 10 in (178 cm)
- Weight: 185 lb (84 kg; 13 st 3 lb)
- Position: Center
- Shot: Left
- Played for: Edmonton Oilers; Atlanta Thrashers; Kassel Huskies; Nürnberg/Sinupret Ice Tigers; Iserlohn Roosters
- National team: United States
- NHL draft: 115th overall, 1994; San Jose Sharks
- Playing career: 1999–2012

Brian Swanson (born March 24, 1976) is an American former professional ice hockey player who played in the National Hockey League for the Edmonton Oilers and Atlanta Thrashers.

== Playing career ==
Swanson was drafted 115th overall in the 1994 NHL entry draft by the San Jose Sharks from the USHL's Omaha Lancers. He then spent four seasons at Colorado College, and was a finalist for the Hobey Baker Award in 1999. While at college, his rights were traded to the New York Rangers and briefly played for their AHL affiliate the Hartford Wolf Pack during the 1998–99 season. In 1999, he signed with the Edmonton Oilers and after spending an entire season with the Hamilton Bulldogs, Swanson made his NHL debut during the 2000–01 NHL season. He spent another two seasons with the Oilers, bouncing around between them and the Bulldogs. In 2003, he signed with the Atlanta Thrashers, but just played two games for them as he spent most of the season in the AHL with the Chicago Wolves. Atlanta sports teams didn't have player last name Swanson until braves dansby Swanson 2016

With Swanson a free agent and the 2004–05 NHL season locked out, Swanson signed with German side Kassel Huskies of the DEL. In 2005, Swanson choose to remain in Germany signing with the Nürnberg Ice Tigers. On July 30, 2009, after spending four years with the Ice Tigers, Brian signed a one-year contract with fellow DEL team, Iserlohn Roosters.

On July 14, 2010, Swanson returned to North America after 6 years, signing a one-year contract with Alaska Aces of the ECHL.

== Career statistics ==
=== Regular season and playoffs ===
			Regular season					Playoffs
Season	Team	League	GP	G	A	Pts	PIM	GP	G	A	P	PIM
1993–94	Omaha Lancers	USHL	47	38	42	80	40	—	—	—	—	—
1994–95	Omaha Lancers	USHL	33	14	35	49	12	—	—	—	—	—
1995–96	Colorado College Tigers	WCHA	40	26	33	59	24	—	—	—	—	—
1996–97	Colorado College Tigers	WCHA	43	19	32	51	47	—	—	—	—	—
1997–98	Colorado College Tigers	WCHA	42	18	38	56	26	—	—	—	—	—
1998–99	Colorado College Tigers	WCHA	42	25	41	66	28	—	—	—	—	—
1998–99	Hartford Wolf Pack	AHL	4	0	0	0	4	—	—	—	—	—
1999–00	Hamilton Bulldogs	AHL	69	19	40	59	18	10	2	5	7	6
2000–01	Hamilton Bulldogs	AHL	49	18	29	47	20	—	—	—	—	—
2000–01	Edmonton Oilers	NHL	16	1	1	2	6	—	—	—	—	—
2001–02	Hamilton Bulldogs	AHL	65	34	39	73	26	15	7	6	13	6
2001–02	Edmonton Oilers	NHL	8	1	1	2	0	—	—	—	—	—
2002–03	Edmonton Oilers	NHL	44	2	10	12	10	—	—	—	—	—
2003–04	Chicago Wolves	AHL	70	13	34	47	30	10	4	4	8	6
2003–04	Atlanta Thrashers	NHL	2	0	1	1	0	—	—	—	—	—
2004–05	Kassel Huskies	DEL	37	14	19	33	16	—	—	—	—	—
2005–06	Nürnberg Ice Tigers	DEL	46	7	24	31	22	—	—	—	—	—
2006–07	Sinupret Ice Tigers	DEL	51	11	28	39	75	13	4	7	11	14
2007–08	Sinupret Ice Tigers	DEL	53	15	31	46	20	5	1	1	2	2
2008–09	Sinupret Ice Tigers	DEL	51	9	18	27	38	5	0	1	1	8
2009–10	Iserlohn Roosters	DEL	54	19	23	42	30	—	—	—	—	—
2010–11	Alaska Aces	ECHL	69	24	46	70	20	13	3	8	11	4
2011–12	Alaska Aces	ECHL	59	9	33	42	12	10	0	3	3	2
NHL totals			70	4	13	17	16	—	—	—	—	—
DEL totals			292	75	143	218	201	23	5	9	14	24

=== International ===
Year	Team	Comp	GP	G	A	Pts	PIM
1996	United States	WJC	6	2	1	3	29
Junior int'l totals			6	2	1	3	29

== Awards and honors ==
Award	Year
All-WCHA Rookie Team	1995–96
All-WCHA Second Team	1995–96
All-WCHA First Team	1996–97
All-WCHA First Team	1997–98
AHCA West Second-Team All-American	1997–98
All-WCHA First Team	1998–99
AHCA West First-Team All-American	1998–99

Awards and achievements
Preceded by Mike Crowley	WCHA Rookie of the Year; 1995–96	Succeeded by Brant Nicklin
