= Jack Hillen =

American ice hockey player

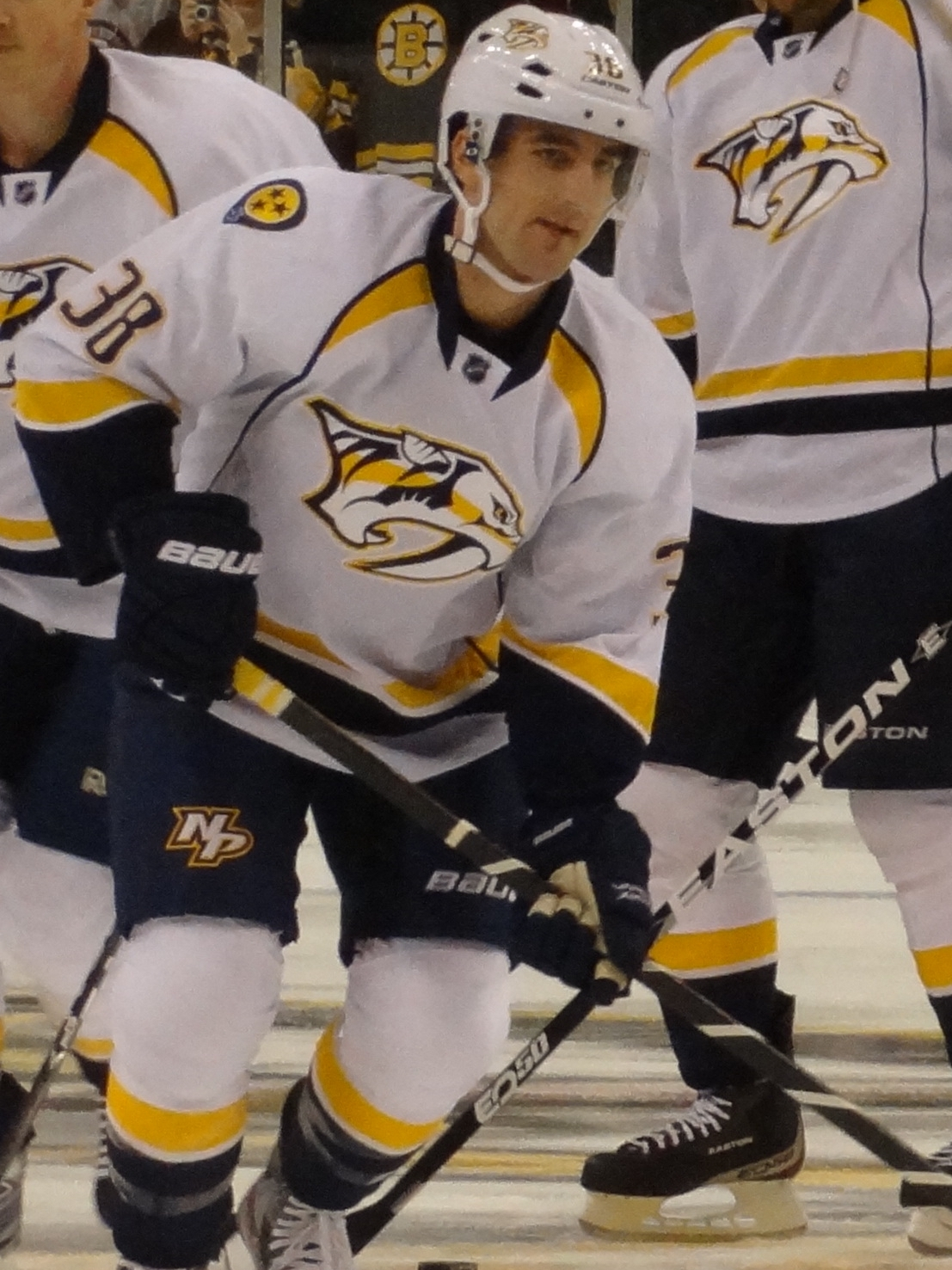
- Hillen playing for the Nashville Predators
- Born: January 24, 1986 (age 40) Minnetonka, Minnesota, U.S.
- Height: 5 ft 10 in (178 cm)
- Weight: 190 lb (86 kg; 13 st 8 lb)
- Position: Defense
- Shot: Left
- Played for: New York Islanders; Nashville Predators; Washington Capitals; Carolina Hurricanes
- National team: United States
- NHL draft: Undrafted
- Playing career: 2008–2015

Jack Robert Hillen (born January 24, 1986) is an American former professional ice hockey defenseman. Undrafted, Hillen played in the NHL for the New York Islanders, Nashville Predators, Washington Capitals and Carolina Hurricanes.

== Playing career ==
=== Minor/collegiate ===
Hillen grew up in Minnetonka, Minnesota, and played youth hockey in the Hopkins Youth Hockey Association. Before entering Colorado College, Hillen played high school hockey for the Academy of Holy Angels in Minnesota.

During his senior year at Colorado College, he won the Defenseman of the Year and first team all Western Collegiate Hockey Association (WCHA). After playing four seasons with the Tigers ice hockey team, graduating with a Bachelor's degree in economics, he was signed as an undrafted free agent by the New York Islanders on a two-year contract.

=== Professional ===
Hillen made his NHL debut on April 3, 2008, with the Islanders in the second-last game of the 2007–08 season against the New York Rangers. He then scored his first career point in his second NHL game, on April 4 and also against the Rangers, recording an assist on a Miroslav Šatan goal.

On January 26, 2010, whilst playing in a home game at Nassau Veterans Memorial Coliseum against the Washington Capitals, Hillen took a direct hit to the face from an Alexander Ovechkin slapshot. Hillen was able to leave the ice under his own power with a trainer attempting to stop the bleeding. He was later transported to a hospital, where he had surgery for a broken jaw and tooth damage; he missed six weeks of action as a result of the injury.

On August 8, 2011, Hillen signed as a free agent on a one-year, two-way contract with the Nashville Predators. During the 2011–12 season, Hillen contributed with six points in 55 games for the Predators.

On July 2, 2012, as a free agent for the second consecutive year, he signed a one-year, one-way contract with the Washington Capitals. After suffering an injury on the opening night of the lockout-shortened 2012–13 season, Hillen later returned to help in the Capitals resurgence, posting nine points in 23 games. On April 2, 2013, he signed a two-year, $1.4 million contract extension with Washington.

On October 3, 2013, a hit from Calgary Flames forward Lance Bouma rammed Hillen into the boards, where he fell awkwardly and had to be helped off the ice after being attended by trainers for several minutes. He successfully underwent surgery to his right leg on October 5 to repair his tibial plateau, the top part of the tibia that lies underneath the knee. He was expected to miss four-to-six months. Continuing his string of bad luck, on March 25, 2014, Hillen collided with Alexander Ovechkin and was knocked unconscious.

In the midst of his third season with the Capitals in 2014–15, Hillen produced five points in 35 games as a depth defender before he was traded, along with a fourth-round pick in 2015, to the Carolina Hurricanes in exchange for Tim Gleason on February 28, 2015.

As a free agent Hillen was unable to attain an NHL contract, and having sustained several injuries opted to retire from professional hockey midway into the following season on December 30, 2015.

== Career statistics ==
=== Regular season and playoffs ===
			Regular season					Playoffs
Season	Team	League	GP	G	A	Pts	PIM	GP	G	A	Pts	PIM
2003–04	Tri-City Storm	USHL	21	2	2	4	16	6	0	1	1	2
2004–05	Colorado College	WCHA	30	2	9	11	20	—	—	—	—	—
2005–06	Colorado College	WCHA	42	4	9	13	48	—	—	—	—	—
2006–07	Colorado College	WCHA	38	7	8	15	38	—	—	—	—	—
2007–08	Colorado College	WCHA	41	6	31	37	60	—	—	—	—	—
2007–08	New York Islanders	NHL	2	0	1	1	4	—	—	—	—	—
2008–09	New York Islanders	NHL	40	1	5	6	16	—	—	—	—	—
2008–09	Bridgeport Sound Tigers	AHL	33	4	13	17	31	5	0	2	2	2
2009–10	New York Islanders	NHL	69	3	18	21	44	—	—	—	—	—
2010–11	New York Islanders	NHL	64	4	18	22	45	—	—	—	—	—
2011–12	Nashville Predators	NHL	55	2	4	6	20	2	0	0	0	2
2012–13	Washington Capitals	NHL	23	3	6	9	14	7	0	1	1	6
2013–14	Washington Capitals	NHL	13	0	1	1	4	—	—	—	—	—
2013–14	Hershey Bears	AHL	2	0	2	2	0	—	—	—	—	—
2014–15	Washington Capitals	NHL	35	0	5	5	10	—	—	—	—	—
2014–15	Carolina Hurricanes	NHL	3	0	0	0	0	—	—	—	—	—
NHL totals			304	13	58	71	157	9	0	1	1	8

=== International ===
Year	Team	Event	Result	GP	G	A	Pts	PIM
2010	United States	WC	13th	6	0	1	1	2
Senior totals				6	0	1	1	2

== Awards and honors ==
Award	Year
All-WCHA First Team	2008
AHCA West First-Team All-American	2008
WCHA All-Academic Team	2008
WCHA Scholar Athlete Award	2008
ESPN Academic All-America University Team	2008

Awards and achievements
Preceded by Alex Goligoski	WCHA Defensive Player of the Year; 2007–08	Succeeded by Chay Genoway
