= Dave Feamster =

American retired ice hockey player

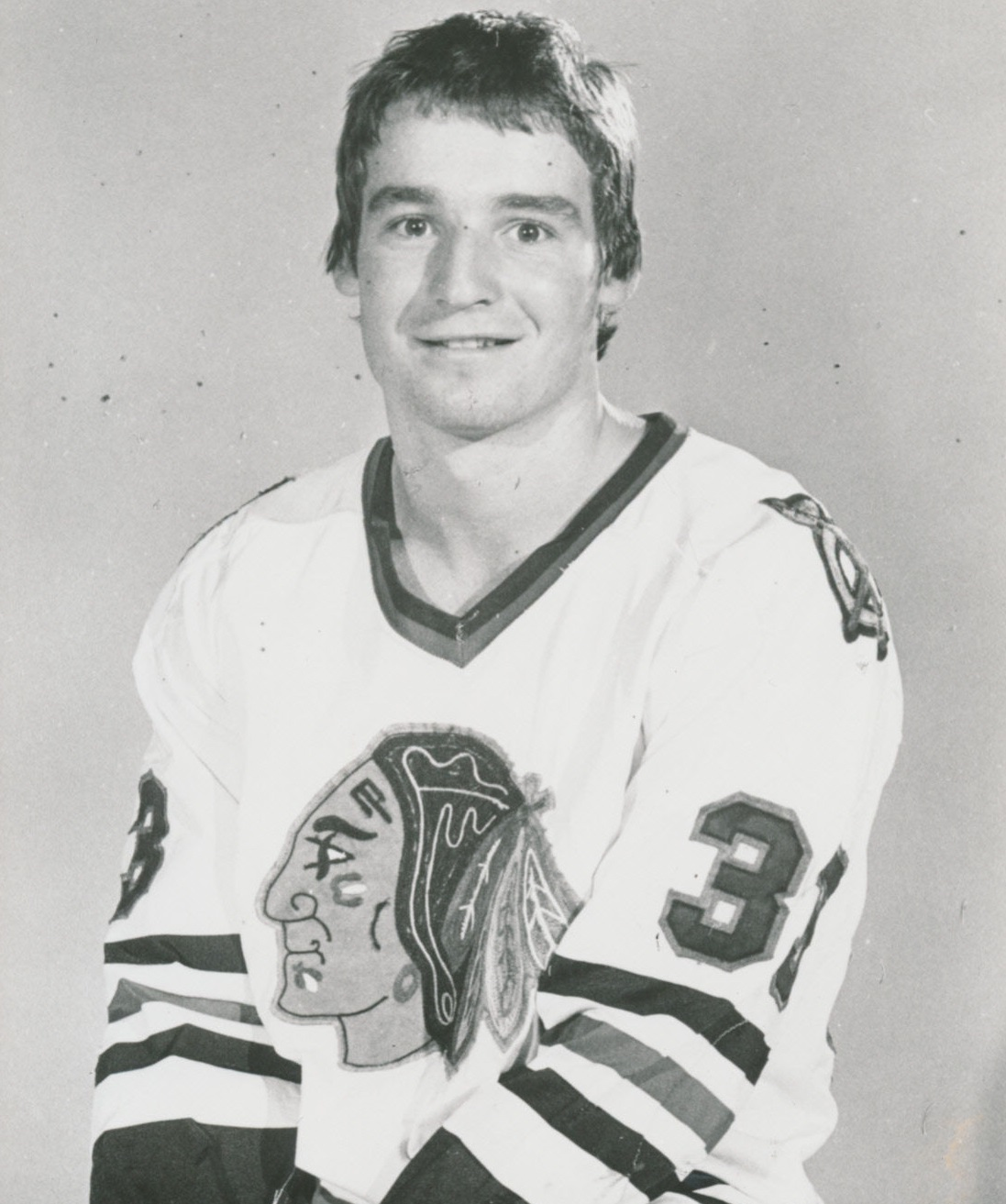
- Feamster in 1979
- Born: September 10, 1958 (age 66); Detroit, Michigan, U.S.
- Height: 5 ft 11 in (180 cm)
- Weight: 180 lb (82 kg; 12 st 12 lb)
- Position: Defense
- Shot: Left
- Played for: Chicago Black Hawks
- National team: United States
- NHL draft: 96th overall, 1978; Chicago Black Hawks
- Playing career: 1978–1985

David Allan Feamster (born September 10, 1958) is an American former professional ice hockey player who played 169 games in the National Hockey League for the Chicago Black Hawks between 1982 and 1984. He was picked in the 1978 NHL Amateur Draft, after coming through Colorado College and made his debut in 1982. He retired in 1985 and currently owns six Little Caesars pizzerias in Pueblo, Colorado, where he was featured in Eric Schlosser's book Fast Food Nation.

== Career statistics ==
=== Regular season and playoffs ===
			Regular season					Playoffs
Season	Team	League	GP	G	A	Pts	PIM	GP	G	A	Pts	PIM
1975–76	Detroit Jr. Red Wings	GLJHL	41	19	22	41	—	—	—	—	—	—
1976–77	Colorado College	NCAA	37	9	28	37	96	—	—	—	—	—
1977–78	Colorado College	NCAA	39	8	33	41	90	—	—	—	—	—
1978–79	Colorado College	NCAA	37	11	45	56	98	—	—	—	—	—
1979–80	Colorado College	NCAA	37	17	33	50	135	—	—	—	—	—
1980–81	Dallas Black Hawks	CHL	77	12	33	45	117	6	2	3	5	23
1981–82	Chicago Blackhawks	NHL	29	0	2	2	29	15	2	4	6	53
1981–82	New Brunswick Hawks	AHL	42	6	30	36	69	—	—	—	—	—
1982–83	Chicago Blackhawks	NHL	78	6	12	18	69	13	1	0	1	4
1983–84	Chicago Blackhawks	NHL	46	6	7	13	42	5	0	1	1	4
1984–85	Chicago Blackhawks	NHL	16	1	3	4	14	—	—	—	—	—
NHL totals			169	13	24	37	154	33	3	5	8	61

=== International ===
Year	Team	Event	GP	G	A	Pts	PIM
1978	United States	WJC	6	0	5	5	8
Junior totals			6	0	5	5	8

== Awards and honors ==
Award	Year
All-WCHA Second Team	1978–79
All-WCHA First Team	1979–80
AHCA West All-American	1979–80
