= Art Berglund =

American ice hockey player (1940–2020)

Arthur J. Berglund (September 4, 1940 – December 19, 2020) was an American ice hockey coach and executive. He won the Lester Patrick Trophy in 1992, and was inducted into the IIHF Hall of Fame in 2008. His international hockey career spanned around five decades; during that time, he was mostly a manager or part of the administrative staff of over 30 teams from the United States.

== Career ==
Berglund graduated from Colorado College in 1963, where he was the leading scorer. He then had a brief playing career in Austria and Switzerland, after which he permanently moved to the United States. On the advice of William Thayer Tutt, Berglund decided to become a hockey executive, rather than player. He became the manager of the United States National Team from 1973 to 1975. In 1976, he was the general manager of the U.S. Olympic ice hockey team. He became general manager of the team again in 1988. He was the general manager of the U.S. Men's National Team from 1985 to 1991. In 1992, Berglund won the Lester Patrick Trophy for outstanding contributions to ice hockey in the United States. He was named senior director of international administration for USA Hockey in 1996. Berglund was mostly retired from the hockey scene by 2005, but he still served as a consultant for USA Hockey.

== Personal life ==
Berglund resided in Colorado Springs, Colorado with his wife Char. He enjoyed ice skating, hockey and golf as pastimes. After he retired, Berglund admitted to being worried about what to do with his memorabilia, which includes a functional Canadian Hockey Foundation letter opener, a 1957 Detroit Red Wings poster signed by Gordie Howe, Al Arbour and Terry Sawchuk, a poster made for the 1969 ice hockey world championship tournament, which was to be held in Prague but was canceled because of the Soviet invasion, and a Nagano Olympics puck.
