= 2000–01 Eredivisie (ice hockey) season =

Dutch ice hockey season

The 2000–01 Eredivisie season was the 41st season of the Eredivisie, the top level of ice hockey in the Netherlands. Six teams participated in the league, and the Tilburg Trappers won the championship.

== First round ==
	Club	GP	W	OTW	OTL	L	GF	GA	Pts
1.	Tilburg Trappers	20	17	0	1	2	96	54	52
2.	Eaters Geleen	20	9	3	0	8	93	86	33
3.	Nijmegen Tigers	20	10	0	2	8	90	66	32
4.	Heerenveen Flyers	20	8	2	0	10	65	70	28
5.	Amstel Tijgers Amsterdam	20	6	1	3	10	60	69	23
6.	S.IJ. Den Bosch	20	2	2	2	14	44	103	12

== Second round ==
=== Group A ===
	Club	GP	W	OTW	OTL	L	GF	GA	Pts
1.	Tilburg Trappers	4	3	0	0	1	16	7	9
2.	Eaters Geleen	4	2	0	0	2	16	16	6
3.	Nijmegen Tigers	4	1	0	0	3	11	20	3

=== Group B ===
	Club	GP	W	OTW	OTL	L	GF	GA	Pts
4.	Heerenveen Flyers	4	3	0	0	1	19	5	9
5.	Amstel Tijgers Amsterdam	4	3	0	0	1	19	9	9
6.	S.IJ. Den Bosch	4	0	0	0	4	6	30	0

== Playoffs ==
Semi-finals
Tilburg Trappers	3
Heerenveen Flyers	2
Eaters Geleen	2
Nijmegen Tigers	3

Final
Tilburg Trappers	3
Nijmegen Tigers	1
Third place
not held
