= Rob Doyle (ice hockey) =

Austrian ice hockey player (born 1964)

- Born: 10 February 1964 (age 61); Lindsay, Ontario, Canada
- Height: 5 ft 11 in (180 cm)
- Weight: 185 lb (84 kg; 13 st 3 lb)
- Position: Defence
- Shot: Right
- Played for: Adirondack Red Wings; Flint Spirits; EC Graz; Fort Wayne Komets; EC KAC; Frankfurt Lions; EHC Lustenau; VEU Feldkirch; EC VSV; Linz EHC
- National team: Austria
- NHL draft: 1986 NHL Supplemental Draft; Detroit Red Wings
- Playing career: 1987–2006

Rob Doyle (born 10 February 1964) is a Canadian-born Austrian ice hockey player. He competed in the men's tournament at the 1994 Winter Olympics.

== Awards and honours ==
Award	Year
AHCA West Second-Team All-American	1986–87
