= Vern Mott =

Canadian-born Norwegian ice hockey player

Vernon Douglas Mott (born March 26, 1957) is a Canadian-born Norwegian former ice hockey player. He was born in Fillmore, Saskatchewan, and played for the club IF Frisk Asker and he also played for Viking Hockey). He played for the Norwegian national ice hockey team at the 1988 Winter Olympics. He played 12 official national team matches for Norway.
