= 2007–08 DEL season =

2007–08 Deutsche Eishockey Liga season
- League: Deutsche Eishockey Liga
- Sport: Ice hockey
- Teams: 15

2007–08
- Season champions: Eisbären Berlin

DEL seasons
- ← 2006–07 2008–09 →

The 2007–08 Deutsche Eishockey Liga season was the 14th season since the founding of the Deutsche Eishockey Liga (DEL; English: German Ice Hockey League). Fifteen teams played after the Grizzly Adams Wolfsburg received the license and were admitted to play in the DEL. Each club played the other four times, resulting in 56 regular-season games per club. The top six clubs at the end of the regular season qualified for the first round of the play-offs. The clubs seven to ten played a preliminary round to determine the last two places for the first round. For the teams placed eleven to fifteen, the season ended. No club was relegated from the DEL in this season.

The Eisbären Berlin (English: Berlin Polar Bears) won their third championship in four years.

== Regular season ==
The final table operates under the following points system: Three points for a win, two for a win after overtime or penalties, one for a loss after overtime or penalties and no points for an outright loss.

| | Team | GP | W | OTW | SOW | OTL | SOL | L | Goals | Points |
|---|---|---|---|---|---|---|---|---|---|---|
| 1. | Sinupret Ice Tigers | 56 | 33 | 1 | 3 | 3 | 5 | 11 | 206:144 | 115 |
| 2. | Eisbären Berlin | 56 | 33 | 2 | 3 | 3 | 1 | 14 | 231:165 | 113 |
| 3. | Kölner Haie | 56 | 28 | 6 | 3 | 4 | 3 | 12 | 192:146 | 109 |
| 4. | Frankfurt Lions | 56 | 24 | 5 | 3 | 4 | 5 | 15 | 188:172 | 97 |
| 5. | Iserlohn Roosters | 56 | 25 | 4 | 4 | 4 | 1 | 18 | 208:196 | 96 |
| 6. | Adler Mannheim | 56 | 24 | 3 | 5 | 2 | 2 | 20 | 180:174 | 92 |
| 7. | Hamburg Freezers | 56 | 23 | 1 | 4 | 1 | 7 | 20 | 194:171 | 87 |
| 8. | Hannover Scorpions | 56 | 20 | 4 | 3 | 3 | 9 | 17 | 171:171 | 86 |
| 9. | DEG Metro Stars | 56 | 23 | 2 | 3 | 3 | 3 | 22 | 169:173 | 85 |
| 10. | ERC Ingolstadt | 56 | 19 | 7 | 4 | 3 | 1 | 22 | 180:190 | 83 |
| 11. | Krefeld Pinguine | 56 | 22 | 2 | 1 | 3 | 5 | 23 | 191:193 | 80 |
| 12. | Augsburger Panther | 56 | 16 | 3 | 4 | 3 | 2 | 28 | 158:187 | 67 |
| 13. | Grizzly Adams Wolfsburg | 56 | 14 | 2 | 3 | 2 | 1 | 34 | 152:202 | 55 |
| 14. | Straubing Tigers | 56 | 12 | 0 | 4 | 4 | 2 | 34 | 132:197 | 50 |
| 15. | EV Duisburg | 56 | 10 | 3 | 2 | 3 | 2 | 36 | 142:213 | 45 |

GP = Games Played, W = Wins, OTW = Overtime win, SOW = Shootout win, OTL = Overtime loss, SOL = Shootout loss, L = Loss
Color code: = Direct Playoff qualification, = Playoff qualification round, = No playoff

| Player | Club | Games | Goals | Assists | Points |
| (Germany) Robert Hock | Iserlohn Roosters | 56 | 24 | 63 | 87 |
| (Canada) Steve Walker | Eisbären Berlin | 53 | 27 | 58 | 85 |
| (Canada) Peter Sarno | Hamburg Freezers | 56 | 26 | 48 | 74 |
| (Germany) Michael Wolf | Iserlohn Roosters | 56 | 44 | 27 | 71 |
| (Slovakia) Ivan Čiernik | Kölner Haie | 56 | 38 | 28 | 66 |

== Playoffs ==
The four rounds of the 2007-08 play-offs were played under the following system:

- Preliminary round: Best-of-three
- First round: Best-of-seven
- Semi finals: Best-of-five
- Finals: Best-of-five

Unlike the regular season, in the play-offs games will not be decided by penalty shoot-outs but in overtime (OT) sudden-death. In all play-off rounds the higher placed team from the regular season has home advantage in the uneven numbered games (Game 1, 3, 5, 7) and the other team in the even numbered games (Game 2, 4, 6).

First round
1 | Sinupret Ice Tigers | 1
9 | DEG Metro Stars | 4
2 | Eisbären Berlin | 4
7 | Hamburg Freezers | 1
3 | Kölner Haie | 4
6 | Adler Mannheim | 1
4 | Frankfurt Lions | 4
5 | Iserlohn Roosters | 3

Semi final
9 | DEG Metro Stars | 2
2 | Eisbären Berlin | 3
3 | Kölner Haie | 3
4 | Frankfurt Lions | 2

Final
2 | Eisbären Berlin | 3
3 | Kölner Haie | 1

=== Qualifying round ===
Qualifications

| | | | Series | 1 | 2 | 3 | RS |
|---|---|---|---|---|---|---|---|
| Hamburg Freezers | – | ERC Ingolstadt | 2:1 | 3:5 | 5:4 OT | 4:3 | [1:3] |
| Hannover Scorpions | – | DEG Metro Stars | 1:2 | 4:3 | 2:4 | 1:2 OT | [2:2] |

RS = Regular season; OT = Overtime

=== Quarterfinals ===
| Team | Team | Game 1 | Game 2 | Game 3 | Game 4 | Game 5 | Game 6 | Game 7 |
| Sinupret Ice Tigers | DEG Metro Stars | 3-2 | 1-3 | 1-2 | 3-6 | 2-3 | — | — |
| Eisbären Berlin | Hamburg Freezers | 2-4 | 7-4 | 6-1 | 6-1 | 4-3 OT | — | — |
| Kölner Haie | Adler Mannheim | 4-3 | 1-2 | 5-4 OT | 4-3 OT | 4-1 | — | — |
| Frankfurt Lions | Iserlohn Roosters | 4-3 OT | 2-3 OT | 3-4 OT | 1-5 | 4-2 | 4-0 | 4-3 |

=== Semi finals ===
| Team | Team | Game 1 | Game 2 | Game 3 | Game 4 | Game 5 |
| Eisbären Berlin | DEG Metro Stars | 4-1 | 3-4 | 4-3 OT | 1-5 | 3-1 |
| Kölner Haie | Frankfurt Lions | 7-1 | 4-5 OT | 2-1 OT | 3-4 | 3-2 |

=== Finals ===
| Team | Team | Game 1 | Game 2 | Game 3 | Game 4 | Game 5 |
| Eisbären Berlin | Kölner Haie | 3-2 OT | 1-2 | 4-3 | 2-1 OT | — |

=== Top scorers ===
| Player | Club | Games | Goals | Assists | Points |
| (Canada) Nathan Robinson | Eisbären Berlin | 13 | 4 | 11 | 15 |
| (Slovakia) Ivan Ciernik | Kölner Haie | 14 | 11 | 2 | 13 |
| (Canada) Chris Taylor | Frankfurt Lions | 12 | 5 | 8 | 13 |
| (Canada) Peter Sarno | Hamburg Freezers | 8 | 4 | 9 | 13 |
| (Germany) Sven Felski | Eisbären Berlin | 13 | 3 | 10 | 13 |
| (Canada) Jason Young | Frankfurt Lions | 12 | 3 | 10 | 13 |
