= List of Chicago Cougars players =

Former WHAers who played for the Chicago Cougars

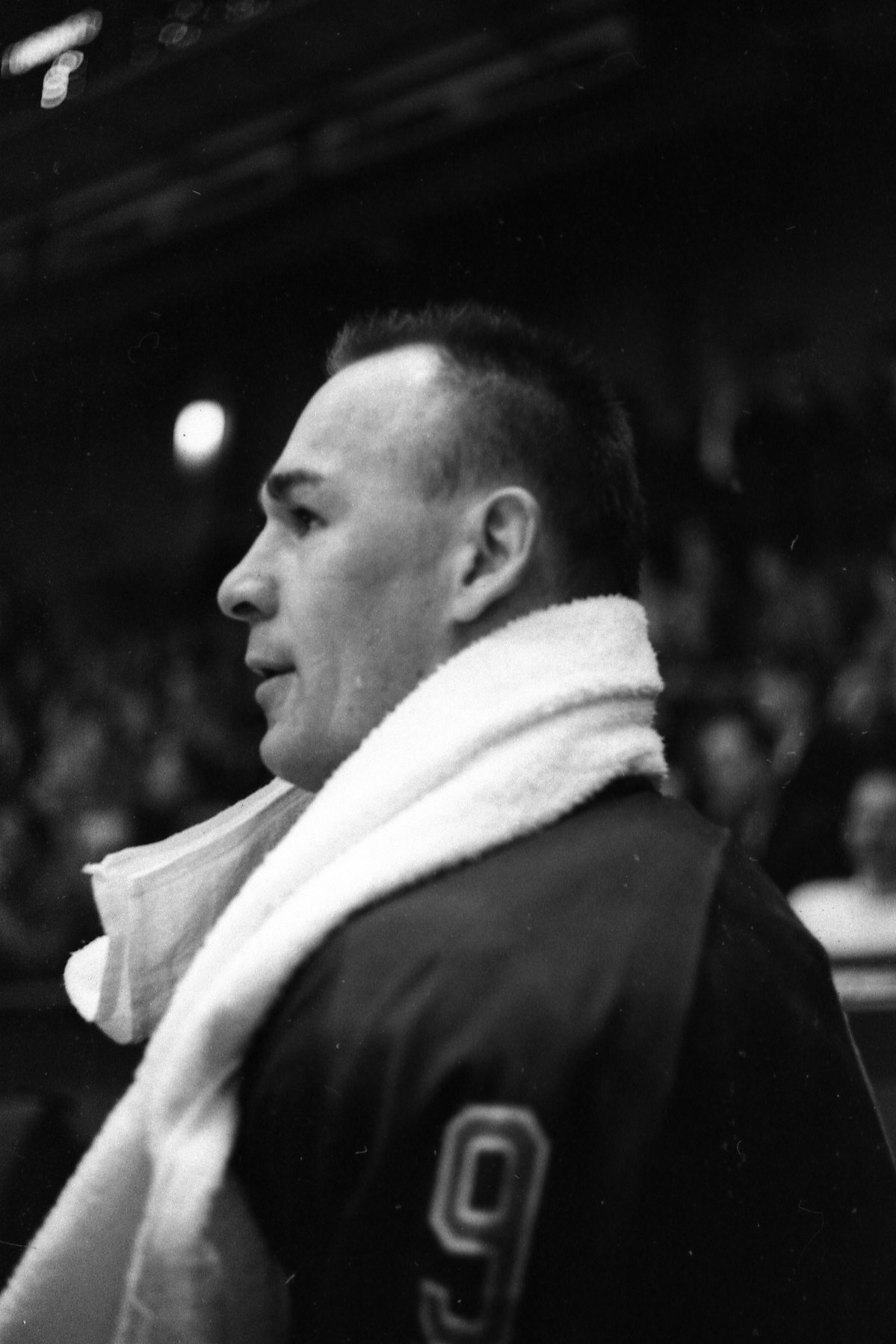
Reg Fleming, pictured here with the New York Rangers of the National Hockey League, played with the Cougars for two seasons.

The Chicago Cougars were a professional ice hockey team based in Chicago, Illinois. They were members of the Western Division of the World Hockey Association (WHA). The club was founded in 1972 as one of the league's twelve original franchises. The Cougars played their home games in the International Amphitheatre. Fifty-seven players played at least one game for the club, either in the WHA regular season or the playoffs.

The Cougars made the playoffs once in their three-year existence, reaching the 1973–74 Avco World Trophy finals. Rosaire Paiement was the franchise leader in games played (234), goals (89), assists (127), and points (216). Defenseman Larry Mavety was the club's all-time leader in penalty minutes (356). Goaltender Cam Newton recorded the most wins (37).

== Key ==
All players
Nat	Nationality
(Canada)	Canada
(Denmark)	Denmark
(Lebanon)	Lebanon
(United States)	United States

Goaltenders
GP	Games played
W	Wins
L	Losses
T	Ties
SO	Shutouts
GAA	Goals against average
SV%	Save percentage

Skaters
Pos	Position
C	Center
D	Defenceman
LW	Left Wing
RW	Right Wing
GP	Games played
G	Goals
A	Assists
P	Points
PIM	Penalty minutes

== Goaltenders ==
Name	Nat	Seasons	Regular season							Playoffs				
Name	Nat	Seasons	GP	W	L	T	SO	GAA	SV%	GP	W	L	SO	GAA
Coutu, Rich	(Canada)	1973–1975	21	9	11	1	0	3.79	.880	—	—	—	—	—
Dryden, Dave	(Canada)	1974–1975	45	18	26	1	1	3.87	.895	—	—	—	—	—
Dumas, Richard	(Canada)	1974–1975	1	0	0	0	0	0.00	N/A	—	—	—	—	—
Gill, Andre	(Canada)	1972–1974	46	8	31	2	0	3.92	.883	11	6	5	0	3.71
McLeod, Jimmy	(Canada)	1972–1973	54	22	25	2	1	3.32	.905	—	—	—	—	—
Menard, Paul	(Canada)	1972–1973	1	0	1	0	0	6.66	.783	—	—	—	—	—
Newton, Cam	(Canada)	1973–1975	77	37	38	2	1	3.48	.895	10	2	5	0	4.20

== Skaters ==
Name	Nat	Pos	Seasons	Regular season					Playoffs				
Name	Nat	Pos	Seasons	GP	G	A	Pts	PIM	GP	G	A	Pts	PIM
Anderson, Ron	(Canada)	D	1972–1974	76	3	26	29	34	—	—	—	—	—
Angotti, Lou	(Canada)	RW	1974–1975	26	2	5	7	9	—	—	—	—	—
Backstrom, Ralph	(Canada)	C	1973–1975	148	48	74	122	54	18	5	4	9	8
Baltimore, Bryon	(Canada)	D	1974–1975	77	8	12	20	110	—	—	—	—	—
Barber, Bob "Butch"	(Canada)	D	1972–1973	75	4	19	23	39	—	—	—	—	—
Benzelock, Jim	(Canada)	RW	1972–1975	106	15	21	36	56	18	2	2	4	36
Blanchette, Bernie	(Canada)	RW	1972–1973	24	2	3	5	8	—	—	—	—	—
Brackenbury, Curt	(Canada)	LW	1973–1974	4	0	1	1	11	—	—	—	—	—
Cahan, Larry	(Canada)	D	1972–1974	78	1	10	11	46	—	—	—	—	—
Coates, Brian	(Canada)	LW	1973–1975	85	22	12	34	40	17	0	3	3	35
Connelly, Gary	(Canada)	RW	1973–1974	4	0	1	1	2	—	—	—	—	—
Fleming, Reg	(Canada)	D	1972–1974	120	25	57	82	142	12	0	4	4	12
Forey, Connie	(Canada)	LW	1973–1974	1	0	0	0	0	—	—	—	—	—
Glenwright, Brian	(Canada)	LW	1972–1974	65	5	9	14	0	—	—	—	—	—
Gordon, Don	(Canada)	RW	1973–1975	65	9	9	18	19	18	4	8	12	4
Hardy, Jocelyn 'Joe'	(Canada)	C	1973–1975	94	25	41	66	63	17	4	6	10	13
Harris, George "Duke"	(Canada)	RW	1973–1975	118	23	25	58	38	18	6	6	12	2
Hatoum, Ed	(Lebanon)	RW	1972–1973	15	1	1	2	2	—	—	—	—	—
Jones, Jim	(Canada)	D	1973–1974	1	0	0	0	0	—	—	—	—	—
Knibbs, Darrel	(Canada)	C	1972–1973	41	3	8	11	0	—	—	—	—	—
Kokkola, Keith	(Canada)	D	1974–1975	33	0	2	2	69	—	—	—	—	—
Liddington, Bob	(Canada)	LW	1972–1975	229	69	50	119	71	18	6	5	11	11
Lodboa, Dan	(Canada)	RW	1972–1973	58	15	18	33	16	—	—	—	—	—
Lomenda, Mark	(Canada)	RW	1974–1975	69	16	33	49	21	—	—	—	—	—
MacGregor, Gary	(Canada)	C	1974–1975	78	42	34	76	26	—	—	—	—	—
MacKenzie, Al	(Canada)	D	1973–1974	2	0	0	0	0	—	—	—	—	—
Maggs, Darryl	(Canada)	D	1973–1975	155	14	49	63	285	18	3	5	8	71
Mara, Peter	(Canada)	C	1974–1975	67	17	21	38	16	—	—	—	—	—
Mavety, Larry	(Canada)	D	1972–1975	201	34	98	132	356	18	4	8	12	46
McCallum, Dunc	(Canada)	D	1974–1975	31	0	10	10	24	—	—	—	—	—
McGlynn, Dick	(United States)	D	1972–1973	30	0	0	0	12	—	—	—	—	—
Morris, Rick	(Canada)	LW	1972–1975	230	63	46	109	334	18	4	3	7	42
Nesterenko, Eric	(Canada)	C	1973–1974	29	2	5	7	8	—	—	—	—	—
Paiement, Rosaire	(Canada)	C	1972–1975	234	89	127	216	319	18	9	6	15	16
Popiel, Jan	(Denmark)	LW	1972–1975	199	71	73	144	187	18	8	5	13	12
Pritchard, Jim	(Canada)	D	1974–1975	2	0	0	0	0	—	—	—	—	—
Proceviat, Dick	(Canada)	D	1972–1975	141	6	37	43	99	13	0	4	4	10
Rochon, Frank	(Canada)	LW	1973–1975	138	39	40	79	46	9	2	1	3	0
Rombough, Lorne	(Canada)	LW	1973–1974	3	1	2	3	0	—	—	—	—	—
Sarrazin, Dick	(Canada)	RW	1972–1973	33	3	8	11	2	—	—	—	—	—
Shmyr, John	(Canada)	D	1973–1974	43	1	3	4	13	—	—	—	—	—
Sicinski, Bob	(Canada)	C	1972–1974	146	36	92	128	26	18	6	8	14	0
Stapleton, Pat	(Canada)	D	1973–1975	146	10	82	92	82	12	0	13	13	36
Trooien, Jerry	(United States)	LW	1972–1973	2	0	0	0	0	—	—	—	—	—
Viau, Pierre	(Canada)	D	1972–1973	4	0	0	0	0	—	—	—	—	—
Walter, Dave	(Canada)	C	1973–1975	10	1	1	2	2	—	—	—	—	—
Watson, Jim	(Canada)	D	1973–1975	80	2	11	13	53	18	2	3	5	18
Whitlock, Bob	(Canada)	LW	1972–1974	127	39	47	86	79	—	—	—	—	—
Zaine, Rod	(Canada)	C	1972–1975	219	11	33	44	58	18	2	1	3	2

== Notes ==
- "HockeyDB Chicago Cougars all-time statistics". HockeyDB.
