= 1973–74 Chicago Cougars season =

World Hockey Association team season

1973–74 Chicago Cougars
- Division: 4th East
- 1973–74 record: 38–35–5
- Home record: 23–13–3
- Road record: 15–22–2
- Goals for: 271
- Goals against: 273

Team information
- General manager: Jacques Demers (Director of Player Personnel)
- Coach: Pat Stapleton
- Alternate captains: Dick Proceviat; Bob Sicinski; Rosaire Paiement; Reg Fleming
- Arena: International Amphitheatre; Randhurst Ice Arena (five playoff games)
- Average attendance: 4,924 (54.7%)

Team leaders
- Goals: Ralph Backstrom (33)
- Assists: Pat Stapleton (52)
- Points: Ralph Backstrom (83)
- Penalty minutes: Larry Mavety (157)
- Wins: Cam Newton (25)
- Goals against average: Cam Newton (3.14)

The 1973–74 Chicago Cougars season was the Chicago Cougars' second season of operation in the World Hockey Association. The team qualified for the playoff and won two playoff series to make it to the Avco Cup Final before losing to the Houston Aeros.

== Offseason ==
The Chicago Cougars revamped their lineup during the off-season in hopes of escaping the cellar. The Cougars strengthened their defense by signing National Hockey League all-star defenceman Pat Stapleton from the Chicago Blackhawks as a player-coach, Darryl Maggs from the California Golden Seals and goaltender Cam Newton from the Pittsburgh Penguins. To the forward line, the Cougars signed Ralph Backstrom, also from the Blackhawks, Eric Nesterenko, who had spent a season in Switzerland after a long career with the Blackhawks and Maple Leafs, and junior all-star Frank Rochon from the Sherbrooke Beavers, and acquired Joe Hardy from the Cleveland Crusaders and Duke Harris from the Houston Aeros.

== Regular season ==
The Cougars scored 26 more goals than the previous season and reduced the goals against by 22 to post a 50% improvement in points and secure the final playoff spot in the East Division by a single point over the Quebec Nordiques.

=== Final standings ===
Eastern Division
	GP	W	L	T	GF	GA	PIM	Pts
New England Whalers	78	43	31	4	291	260	875	90
Toronto Toros	78	41	33	4	304	272	871	86
Cleveland Crusaders	78	37	32	9	266	264	1007	83
Chicago Cougars	78	38	35	5	271	273	1041	81
Quebec Nordiques	78	38	36	4	306	280	909	80
NY Golden Blades / Jersey Knights	78	32	42	4	268	313	933	68

== Schedule and results ==
1973–74 regular season
October

Game	Result	Date	Score	Opponent	Record
1	T	October 7, 1973	4–4	@ Toronto Toros (1973–74)	0–0–1
2	W	October 11, 1973	4–3	@ New York Golden Blades/New Jersey Knights (1973–74)	1–0–1
3	L	October 13, 1973	4–6	@ New England Whalers (1973–74)	1–1–1
4	L	October 14, 1973	2–3 OT	@ Cleveland Crusaders (1973–74)	1–2–1
5	W	October 18, 1973	7–2	@ Los Angeles Sharks (1973–74)	2–2–1
6	L	October 20, 1973	3–4	@ Vancouver Blazers (1973–74)	2–3–1
7	L	October 21, 1973	1–4	@ Edmonton Oilers (1973–74)	2–4–1
8	W	October 25, 1973	4–2	@ Quebec Nordiques (1973–74)	3–4–1
9	W	October 28, 1973	3–2	@ Toronto Toros (1973–74)	4–4–1
10	W	October 30, 1973	4–1	Winnipeg Jets (1973–74)	5–4–1

November

Game	Result	Date	Score	Opponent	Record
11	W	November 3, 1973	7–4	@ Cleveland Crusaders (1973–74)	6–4–1
12	W	November 6, 1973	5–4 OT	Los Angeles Sharks (1973–74)	7–4–1
13	W	November 10, 1973	3–2	Toronto Toros (1973–74)	8–4–1
14	L	November 13, 1973	2–5	Cleveland Crusaders (1973–74)	8–5–1
15	W	November 15, 1973	3–2	Houston Aeros (1973–74)	9–5–1
16	W	November 17, 1973	5–2	Toronto Toros (1973–74)	10–5–1
17	L	November 18, 1973	3–5	@ New York Golden Blades/New Jersey Knights (1973–74)	10–6–1
18	W	November 22, 1973	4–3	@ Los Angeles Sharks (1973–74)	11–6–1
19	L	November 24, 1973	3–5	@ Houston Aeros (1973–74)	11–7–1

December

Game	Result	Date	Score	Opponent	Record
20	L	December 1, 1973	4–5 OT	Los Angeles Sharks (1973–74)	11–8–1
21	L	December 2, 1973	3–4	@ New England Whalers (1973–74)	11–9–1
22	L	December 4, 1973	0–2	Edmonton Oilers (1973–74)	11–10–1
23	L	December 8, 1973	1–3	New York Golden Blades/New Jersey Knights (1973–74)	11–11–1
24	L	December 9, 1973	1–6	@ Quebec Nordiques (1973–74)	11–12–1
25	L	December 11, 1973	3–5	Minnesota Fighting Saints (1973–74)	11–13–1
26	W	December 15, 1973	5–2	Houston Aeros (1973–74)	12–13–1
27	W	December 16, 1973	3–2	@ New England Whalers (1973–74)	13–13–1
28	T	December 18, 1973	3–3	Winnipeg Jets (1973–74)	13–13–2
29	L	December 21, 1973	1–5	@ New York Golden Blades/New Jersey Knights (1973–74)	13–14–2
30	W	December 23, 1973	6–5	@ Toronto Toros (1973–74)	14–14–2
31	L	December 26, 1973	2–4	@ Winnipeg Jets (1973–74)	14–15–2
32	W	December 28, 1973	6–4	Quebec Nordiques (1973–74)	15–15–2
33	L	December 29, 1973	0–3	@ Houston Aeros (1973–74)	15–16–2
34	W	December 30, 1973	5–3	@ Minnesota Fighting Saints (1973–74)	16–16–2

January

Game	Result	Date	Score	Opponent	Record
35	W	January 1, 1974	5–4	Vancouver Blazers (1973–74)	17–16–2
36	L	January 5, 1974	5–6	Minnesota Fighting Saints (1973–74)	17–17–2
37	L	January 6, 1974	0–4	@ Quebec Nordiques (1973–74)	17–18–2
38	T	January 8, 1974	0–0	Cleveland Crusaders (1973–74)	17–18–3
39	L	January 13, 1974	1–3	@ Winnipeg Jets (1973–74)	17–19–3
40	W	January 17, 1974	5–2	@ New England Whalers (1973–74)	18–19–3
41	W	January 19, 1974	5–2	Quebec Nordiques (1973–74)	19–19–3
42	W	January 22, 1974	5–3	New England Whalers (1973–74)	20–19–3
43	L	January 25, 1974	2–6	@ Minnesota Fighting Saints (1973–74)	20–20–3
44	W	January 30, 1974	4–2	@ Vancouver Blazers (1973–74)	21–20–3

February

Game	Result	Date	Score	Opponent	Record
45	L	February 1, 1974	2–3	@ Edmonton Oilers (1973–74)	21–21–3
46	L	February 3, 1974	2–4	@ Winnipeg Jets (1973–74)	21–22–3
47	W	February 5, 1974	3–1	Winnipeg Jets (1973–74)	22–22–3
48	L	February 6, 1974	2–7	@ Minnesota Fighting Saints (1973–74)	22–23–3
49	W	February 9, 1974	5–2	New York Golden Blades/New Jersey Knights (1973–74)	23–23–3
50	W	February 10, 1974	4–2	@ Los Angeles Sharks (1973–74)	24–23–3
51	W	February 12, 1974	3–2	Edmonton Oilers (1973–74)	25–23–3
52	L	February 14, 1974	3–5	Quebec Nordiques (1973–74)	25–24–3
53	L	February 16, 1974	4–5	Toronto Toros (1973–74)	25–25–3
54	L	February 17, 1974	5–6	@ Cleveland Crusaders (1973–74)	25–26–3
55	L	February 18, 1974	3–4	@ New York Golden Blades/New Jersey Knights (1973–74)	25–27–3
56	W	February 21, 1974	5–4	Vancouver Blazers (1973–74)	26–27–3
57	L	February 23, 1974	0–3	New England Whalers (1973–74)	26–28–3
58	L	February 24, 1974	1–3	@ Winnipeg Jets (1973–74)	26–29–3
59	W	February 26, 1974	4–2	Los Angeles Sharks (1973–74)	27–29–3
60	L	February 28, 1974	4–9	Houston Aeros (1973–74)	27–30–3

March

Game	Result	Date	Score	Opponent	Record
61	W	March 1, 1974	7–4	Cleveland Crusaders (1973–74)	28–30–3
62	L	March 3, 1974	4–5	Toronto Toros (1973–74)	28–31–3
63	L	March 5, 1974	2–3	New England Whalers (1973–74)	28–32–3
64	W	March 7, 1974	3–2	@ Quebec Nordiques (1973–74)	29–32–3
65	W	March 9, 1974	5–4 OT	Winnipeg Jets (1973–74)	30–32–3
66	W	March 12, 1974	5–3	New England Whalers (1973–74)	31–32–3
67	W	March 14, 1974	7–4	Minnesota Fighting Saints (1973–74)	32–32–3
68	W	March 16, 1974	4–3 OT	Quebec Nordiques (1973–74)	33–32–3
69	W	March 17, 1974	4–2	@ Toronto Toros (1973–74)	34–32–3
70	L	March 19, 1974	4–7	Cleveland Crusaders (1973–74)	34–33–3
71	T	March 21, 1974	5–5	Vancouver Blazers (1973–74)	34–33–4
72	W	March 23, 1974	4–1	New York Golden Blades/New Jersey Knights (1973–74)	35–33–4
73	T	March 24, 1974	3–3	@ Cleveland Crusaders (1973–74)	35–33–5
74	W	March 26, 1974	4–2	Edmonton Oilers (1973–74)	36–33–5
75	W	March 29, 1974	5–2	@ Vancouver Blazers (1973–74)	37–33–5
76	L	March 31, 1974	1–4	@ Edmonton Oilers (1973–74)	37–34–5

April

Game	Result	Date	Score	Opponent	Record
77	W	April 2, 1974	7–3	New York Golden Blades/New Jersey Knights (1973–74)	38–34–5
78	L	April 3, 1974	1–3	@ Houston Aeros (1973–74)	38–35–5

Legend: Win (2 points) Loss (0 points) Tie (1 point)

== Playoffs ==
1974 Avco Cup playoffs
Division Semifinals vs. New England Whalers – Cougars win 4–3

Game	Date	Visitor	Score	Home	Series
1	April 6	Chicago Cougars	4–6	New England Whalers	0–1
2	April 7	Chicago Cougars	3–4 OT	New England Whalers	0–2
3	April 9	New England Whalers	6–8	Chicago Cougars	1–2
4	April 10	New England Whalers	1–2 OT	Chicago Cougars	2–2
5	April 12	Chicago Cougars	4–2	New England Whalers	2–3
6	April 14	New England Whalers	2–0	Chicago Cougars	3–3
7	April 16	Chicago Cougars	3–2	New England Whalers	4–3

Division Finals vs. Toronto Toros – Cougars win 4–3

Game	Date	Visitor	Score	Home	Series
1	April 19	Chicago Cougars	4–6	Toronto Toros	0–1
2	April 22	Chicago Cougars	4–3	Toronto Toros	1–1
3	April 28	Toronto Toros	2–3	Chicago Cougars	2–1
4	April 30	Toronto Toros	7–6	Chicago Cougars	2–2
5	May 1	Chicago Cougars	3–5	Toronto Toros	2–3
6	May 4	Toronto Toros	2–9	Chicago Cougars	3–3
7	May 6	Chicago Cougars	5–2	Toronto Toros	4–3

Avco Cup Finals vs. Houston Aeros – Aeros win 4–0

Game	Date	Visitor	Score	Home	Series
1	May 12	Houston Aeros	3–2	Chicago Cougars	0–1
2	May 15	Houston Aeros	6–1	Chicago Cougars	0–2
3	May 17	Chicago Cougars	4–7	Houston Aeros	0–3
4	May 19	Chicago Cougars	2–6	Houston Aeros	0–4

Legend: Win Loss

== Player statistics ==
Regular season
Scoring

Player	Pos	GP	G	A	Pts	PIM	+/-	PPG	SHG	GWG
Ralph Backstrom	C	78	33	50	83	26	0	6	2	8
Rosaire Paiement	C	78	30	43	73	87	0	7	0	3
Joe Hardy	C	77	24	35	59	55	0	4	0	2
Pat Stapleton	D	78	6	52	58	44	0	2	1	0
Larry Mavety	D	77	15	36	51	157	0	4	0	4
Bob Liddington	LW	73	26	21	47	20	0	4	1	2
Bob Sicinski	C	69	11	29	40	8	0	1	0	1
Jan Popiel	LW	63	22	17	39	36	0	6	0	4
Bob Whitlock	C	52	16	19	35	26	0	6	1	2
Rick Morris	LW	76	17	16	33	140	0	1	0	2
Duke Harris	RW	64	14	16	30	20	0	3	0	1
Daryl Maggs	D	78	8	22	30	148	0	0	0	1
Frank Rochon	LW	69	12	11	23	27	0	1	0	1
Dick Proceviat	D	77	2	20	22	55	0	0	0	1
Rod Zaine	C	77	5	13	18	17	0	0	1	0
Reggie Fleming	D/LW	45	2	12	14	49	0	1	0	2
Brian Coates	LW	50	10	3	13	14	0	0	1	1
Jim Benzelock	RW	53	6	7	13	19	0	0	0	0
Don Gordon	RW	23	5	4	9	9	0	3	0	0
Eric Nesterenko	RW	29	2	5	7	8	0	1	0	0
Brian Glenwright	LW	15	3	2	5	0	0	0	0	1
Jim Watson	D	23	0	5	5	22	0	0	0	0
John Shmyr	D	43	1	3	4	13	0	0	0	1
Lorne Rombough	LW	3	1	2	3	0	0	1	0	1
Curt Brackenbury	RW	4	0	1	1	11	0	0	0	0
Gary Connelly	RW	4	0	1	1	2	0	0	0	0
Cam Newton	G	45	0	1	1	0	0	0	0	0
Dave Walter	C	4	0	1	1	0	0	0	0	0
Ron F. Anderson	D	2	0	0	0	0	0	0	0	0
Larry Cahan	D	3	0	0	0	2	0	0	0	0
Rich Coutu	G	20	0	0	0	0	0	0	0	0
Connie Forey	LW	1	0	0	0	0	0	0	0	0
Andre Gill	G	13	0	0	0	0	0	0	0	0
Jim Jones	D	1	0	0	0	0	0	0	0	0
Al MacKenzie	D	2	0	0	0	0	0	0	0	0

Goaltending

Player	MIN	GP	W	L	T	GA	GAA	SO
Cam Newton	2732	45	25	18	2	143	3.14	1
Rich Coutu	1207	20	9	10	1	75	3.73	0
Andre Gill	803	13	4	7	2	46	3.44	0
Team:	4742	78	38	35	5	264	3.34	1

Playoffs
Scoring

Player	Pos	GP	G	A	Pts	PIM	PPG	SHG	GWG
Ralph Backstrom	C	18	5	14	19	4	0	0	1
Rosaire Paiement	C	18	9	6	15	16	0	0	2
Bob Sicinski	C	18	6	8	14	0	0	0	2
Jan Popiel	LW	18	8	5	13	12	0	0	1
Pat Stapleton	D	12	0	13	13	36	0	0	0
Duke Harris	RW	18	6	6	12	2	0	0	0
Don Gordon	RW	18	4	8	12	4	0	0	0
Joe Hardy	C	17	4	8	12	13	0	0	0
Larry Mavety	D	18	4	8	12	46	0	0	1
Bob Liddington	LW	18	6	5	11	11	0	0	0
Daryl Maggs	D	18	3	5	8	71	0	0	0
Rick Morris	LW	18	4	3	7	42	0	0	0
Jim Watson	D	18	2	3	5	18	0	0	0
Jim Benzelock	RW	18	2	2	4	36	0	0	0
Reggie Fleming	D/LW	12	0	4	4	12	0	0	0
Dick Proceviat	D	13	0	4	4	10	0	0	0
Frank Rochon	LW	9	2	1	3	0	0	0	1
Rod Zaine	C	18	2	1	3	2	0	0	0
Brian Coates	LW	17	0	3	3	35	0	0	0
Andre Gill	G	11	0	0	0	4	0	0	0
Cam Newton	G	10	0	0	0	0	0	0	0

Goaltending

Player	MIN	GP	W	L	GA	GAA	SO
Andre Gill	614	11	6	5	38	3.71	0
Cam Newton	486	10	2	5	34	4.20	0
Team:	1100	18	8	10	72	3.93	0

Note: Pos = Position; GP = Games played; G = Goals; A = Assists; Pts = Points; +/- = plus/minus; PIM = Penalty minutes; PPG = Power-play goals; SHG = Short-handed goals; GWG = Game-winning goals
MIN = Minutes played; W = Wins; L = Losses; T = Ties; GA = Goals-against; GAA = Goals-against average; SO = Shutouts;

== Transactions ==
=== Trades ===
Date	Details		Ref
May 1, 1973	To New York Golden Blades Butch Barber	To Chicago Cougars Wally Olds
July 13, 1973	To New York Golden Blades Jim McLeod	To Chicago Cougars cash
August 1, 1973	To Cleveland Crusaders rights to Larry Hillman	To Chicago Cougars Joe Hardy
September 1, 1973	To Houston Aeros cash	To Chicago Cougars Duke Harris
September 1, 1973	To Vancouver Blazers Ed Hatoum	To Chicago Cougars cash
February 20, 1974	To Los Angeles Sharks Bob Whitlock	To Chicago Cougars Jim Watson; Don Gordon

== Draft picks ==
Chicago's draft picks at the 1973 WHA Amateur Draft.

Round	#	Player	Nationality	College/Junior/Club team (League)
1	1	Bob Neely (D)	Canada	Peterborough Petes (OHA)
2	15	Larry Goodenough (D)	Canada	London Knights (OHA)
3	27	Frank Rochon (LW)	Canada	Sherbrooke Castors (QMJHL)
4	40	Terry Ewasiuk (LW)	Canada	Victoria Cougars (WCHL)
6	66	Keith Smith (D)	Canada	Brown University (ECAC)
7	79	Dennis Desgagnes (C)	Canada	Sorel Black Hawks (QMJHL)
8	92	J. P. Burgoyne (D)	Canada	Shawinigan Bruins (QMJHL)
9	103	Gordon Halliday (F)	Canada	University of Pennsylvania (ECAC)
10	114	Mike Haramis (RW)	Canada	Laval National (QMJHL)

== See also ==
- 1973–74 WHA season
