= Allan MacKenzie (disambiguation) =

Allan MacKenzie (1931 – 2012), Canadian air force general

Allan MacKenzie may refer to:

- Alan "Doc" Mackenzie (1946–2022), Australian rules footballer administrator
- Alan MacKenzie (born 1966), retired Scottish footballer
- Alan MacKenzie (ice hockey) (born 1952), retired Canadian ice hockey defenceman
- Al MacKenzie, a fictional Marvel Comics character

== See also ==
- Alan McKenzie
- Allen McKenzie
