= Pierre Viau =

Canadian ice hockey player

- Born: January 29, 1952 (age 74) Montreal, Quebec, Canada
- Height: 6 ft 1 in (185 cm)
- Weight: 181 lb (82 kg; 12 st 13 lb)
- Position: Defence
- Shot: Left
- Played for: Chicago Cougars (WHA); Long Island Ducks (EHL); Johnstown Jets (NAHL)
- NHL draft: Undrafted
- Playing career: 1972–1974

Pierre Viau (born January 29, 1952) is a Canadian former professional ice hockey defenceman. During the 1972–73 season, Viau played four games in the World Hockey Association with the Chicago Cougars.

== Career statistics ==
=== Regular season and playoffs ===
			Regular season					Playoffs
Season	Team	League	GP	G	A	Pts	PIM	GP	G	A	Pts	PIM
1970–71	Verdun Maple Leafs	QMJHL	28	1	7	8	20	5	0	3	3	6
1971–72	Cornwall Royals	QMJHL	31	1	7	8	27	9	0	1	1	0
1972–73	R.I.-Clinton-L.I.	EHL	37	3	11	14	19	4	1	0	1	4
1972–73	Chicago Cougars	WHA	4	0	0	0	0	—	—	—	—	—
1973–74	Johnstown Jets	NAHL	3	0	0	0	0	—	—	—	—	—
1973–74	Wendover Rockets	OSHL	Statistics Unavailable
1974–75	Wendover Rockets	OSHL	Statistics Unavailable
WHA totals			4	0	0	0	0	—	—	—	—	—
