= Paul Menard (ice hockey) =

Canadian ice hockey goaltender

- Born: May 22, 1952 (age 74) Chambord, Quebec, Canada
- Height: 5 ft 11 in (180 cm)
- Weight: 165 lb (75 kg; 11 st 11 lb)
- Position: Goaltender
- Caught: Left
- Played for: Chicago Cougars (WHA); Rhode Island Eagles (EHL); Long Island Cougars (NAHL)
- NHL draft: Undrafted
- Playing career: 1972–1974

Paul Leo Menard (born May 22, 1952) is a Canadian former professional ice hockey goaltender. During the 1972–73 season, Menard played one game in the World Hockey Association with the Chicago Cougars.

== Career statistics ==
=== Regular season and playoffs ===
			Regular season									Playoffs
Season	Team	League	GP	W	L	T	MIN	GA	SO	GAA	SV%	GP	W	L	MIN	GA	SO	GAA	SV%
1971–72	Verdun Maple Leafs	QMJHL	8	—	—	—	—	49	0	5.76	.856	—	—	—	—	—	—	—	—
1972–73	Rhode Island Eagles	EHL	34	—	—	—	—	149	1	4.34	—	—	—	—	—	—	—	—	—
1972–73	Chicago Cougars	WHA	1	0	1	0	45	5	0	6.66	.783	—	—	—	—	—	—	—	—
1973–74	Long Island Cougars	NAHL	10	2	6	1	552	46	0	5.00	5	—	—	—	—	—	—	—	—
WHA totals			1	0	1	0	45	5	0	6.66	.783	—	—	—	—	—	—	—	—
