= Larry Cahan =

Canadian ice hockey player

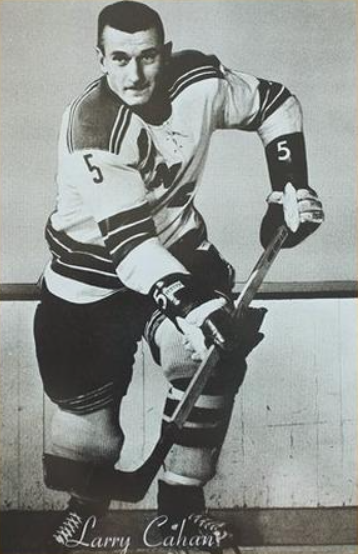
- Cahan in 1960s image
- Born: December 25, 1933 Fort William, Ontario, Canada
- Died: June 25, 1992 (aged 58) Coquitlam, British Columbia, Canada
- Height: 5 ft 10 in (178 cm)
- Weight: 199 lb (90 kg; 14 st 3 lb)
- Position: Defence
- Shot: Right
- Played for: Toronto Maple Leafs; New York Rangers; Oakland Seals; Los Angeles Kings; Chicago Cougars
- Playing career: 1953–1974

Lawrence Louis Henry Cahan (December 25, 1933 – June 25, 1992), was a Canadian professional ice hockey player who played in the National Hockey League and World Hockey Association with the Toronto Maple Leafs, New York Rangers, Oakland Seals, Los Angeles Kings, and Chicago Cougars.

== Early life ==
Cahan was born in Fort William, Ontario.

== Career ==
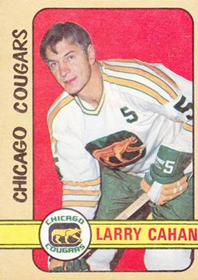
1972 OPC card of Cahan for Chicago Cougars

Cahan's professional playing career lasted from 1953 to 1974. On January 13, 1968, while playing with the Oakland Seals against the Minnesota North Stars, Cahan was involved in the accident that caused the death of Bill Masterton.

== Personal life ==
Cahan died on June 25, 1992, at his home in Coquitlam, British Columbia, Canada from a short-term illness.

== Career statistics ==
=== Regular season and playoffs ===
			Regular season					Playoffs
Season	Team	League	GP	G	A	Pts	PIM	GP	G	A	Pts	PIM
1949–50	Fort William Hurricanes	TBJHL	—	—	—	—	—	—	—	—	—	—
1949–50	Fort William Hurricanes	M-Cup	—	—	—	—	—	12	1	1	2	27
1950–51	Fort William Hurricanes	TBJHL	—	—	—	—	—	—	—	—	—	—
1951–52	Fort William Hurricanes	TBJHL	29	6	17	23	82	9	2	6	8	32
1951–52	Fort William Hurricanes	M-Cup	—	—	—	—	—	12	1	1	2	25
1952–53	Fort William Hurricanes	TBJHL	30	12	17	29	98	4	1	2	3	10
1953–54	Pittsburgh Hornets	AHL	70	1	25	26	179	5	1	0	1	2
1954–55	Toronto Maple Leafs	NHL	58	0	6	6	64	4	0	0	0	0
1955–56	Pittsburgh Hornets	AHL	39	6	9	15	160	4	0	1	1	12
1955–56	Toronto Maple Leafs	NHL	21	0	2	2	46	—	—	—	—	—
1956–57	New York Rangers	NHL	61	5	4	9	65	3	0	0	0	2
1957–58	New York Rangers	NHL	34	1	1	2	20	5	0	0	0	4
1958–59	New York Rangers	NHL	16	1	0	1	8	—	—	—	—	—
1958–59	Vancouver Canucks	WHL	9	2	6	8	22	9	1	2	3	18
1958–59	Springfield Indians	AHL	33	3	11	14	75	—	—	—	—	—
1958–59	Buffalo Bisons	AHL	—	—	—	—	—	3	0	0	0	0
1959–60	Vancouver Canucks	WHL	70	11	22	33	116	11	0	4	4	19
1960–61	Vancouver Canucks	WHL	70	13	15	28	81	9	2	2	4	12
1961–62	New York Rangers	NHL	57	2	7	9	85	6	0	0	0	10
1962–63	New York Rangers	NHL	56	6	14	20	47	—	—	—	—	—
1963–64	Baltimore Clippers	AHL	12	2	8	10	16	—	—	—	—	—
1963–64	New York Rangers	NHL	53	4	8	12	80	—	—	—	—	—
1964–65	Baltimore Clippers	AHL	16	1	6	7	34	—	—	—	—	—
1964–65	New York Rangers	NHL	26	0	5	5	32	—	—	—	—	—
1964–65	Vancouver Canucks	WHL	26	2	15	17	67	5	0	3	3	28
1965–66	Vancouver Canucks	WHL	72	14	34	48	156	7	4	12	16	4
1966–67	Vancouver Canucks	WHL	72	18	36	54	88	8	1	4	5	6
1967–68	Oakland Seals	NHL	74	9	15	24	80	—	—	—	—	—
1968–69	Los Angeles Kings	NHL	72	3	11	14	76	11	1	1	2	22
1969–70	Los Angeles Kings	NHL	70	4	8	12	52	—	—	—	—	—
1970–71	Los Angeles Kings	NHL	67	3	11	14	45	—	—	—	—	—
1971–72	Seattle Totems	WHL	50	4	12	16	44	—	—	—	—	—
1972–73	Chicago Cougars	WHA	75	1	10	11	44	—	—	—	—	—
1973–74	Chicago Cougars	WHA	3	0	0	0	2	—	—	—	—	—
WHA totals			78	1	10	11	46	—	—	—	—	—
NHL totals			665	38	92	130	698	29	1	1	2	38

Preceded by Bob Wall	Los Angeles Kings captain 1969–71	Succeeded by Bob Pulford
