= Cam Newton (ice hockey) =

Canadian ice hockey player (born 1950)

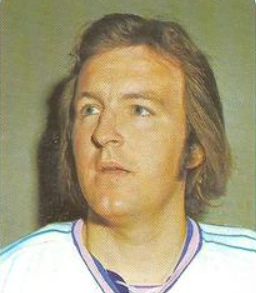
- Newton in 1975 card
- Born: February 25, 1950 (age 76) Peterborough, Ontario, Canada
- Height: 5 ft 10 in (178 cm)
- Weight: 165 lb (75 kg; 11 st 11 lb)
- Position: Goaltender
- Shot: Left
- Played for: Pittsburgh Penguins; Chicago Cougars; Denver Spurs; Ottawa Civics; Cleveland Crusaders
- NHL draft: 102nd overall, 1970; Pittsburgh Penguins
- Playing career: 1970–1977

Cameron Charles Newton (born February 25, 1950) is a Canadian former professional ice hockey goaltender. He played 16 games in the National Hockey League with the Pittsburgh Penguins from 1971 to 1973, and 102 games in the World Hockey Association with the Chicago Cougars, Denver Spurs, Ottawa Civics, and Cleveland Crusaders from 1973 to 1976.

== Early life ==
Newton was born in Peterborough, Ontario. He played in the Ontario Hockey Association junior league with the Toronto Marlboros.

== Career ==
Newton was drafted by the Pittsburgh Penguins in 1970 and played 16 games for the club over two seasons. Newton also played 102 games during his three years in the World Hockey Association for the Chicago Cougars, Denver Spurs, Ottawa Civics and Cleveland Crusaders.

== Career statistics ==
=== Regular season and playoffs ===
			Regular season									Playoffs
Season	Team	League	GP	W	L	T	MIN	GA	SO	GAA	SV%	GP	W	L	MIN	GA	SO	GAA	SV%
1966–67	Toronto Marlboros	OHA	18	—	—	—	1044	59	0	3.39	—	10	—	—	600	32	0	3.20	—
1967–68	Toronto Marlboros	OHA	18	—	—	—	1030	60	0	3.50	—	1	0	0	10	0	0	0.00	1.000
1968–69	Toronto Marlboros	OHA	27	—	—	—	1600	129	0	4.84	—	—	—	—	—	—	—	—	—
1968–69	Kitchener Rangers	OHA	24	—	—	—	1440	135	0	5.63	—	—	—	—	—	—	—	—	—
1969–70	Kitchener Rangers	OHA	42	—	—	—	2520	179	1	4.26	—	4	0	3	206	23	0	7.82	—
1970–71	Pittsburgh Penguins	NHL	5	1	3	1	279	16	0	3.44	.860	—	—	—	—	—	—	—	—
1970–71	Amarillo Wranglers	CHL	15	—	—	—	873	68	0	4.74	—	—	—	—	—	—	—	—	—
1971–72	Hershey Bears	AHL	35	13	17	4	2065	131	0	3.80	—	1	0	1	60	7	0	7.00	—
1972–73	Pittsburgh Penguins	NHL	11	3	4	0	532	35	0	3.95	.882	—	—	—	—	—	—	—	—
1972–73	Hershey Bears	AHL	19	—	—	—	1121	53	2	2.83	—	—	—	—	—	—	—	—	—
1973–74	Chicago Cougars	WHA	45	25	18	2	2732	143	1	3.14	.894	10	2	5	486	34	0	4.20	—
1974–75	Chicago Cougars	WHA	32	12	20	0	1905	126	0	3.97	.895	—	—	—	—	—	—	—	—
1975–76	Denver Spurs/Ottawa Civics	WHA	10	4	6	0	573	35	1	3.66	.889	—	—	—	—	—	—	—	—
1975–76	Cleveland Crusaders	WHA	15	7	7	1	896	48	0	3.21	.897	1	0	1	60	6	0	6.00	—
1976–77	Erie Blades	NAHL	4	—	—	—	122	5	1	1.96	.932	—	—	—	—	—	—	—	—
WHA totals			102	48	51	3	6106	352	0	3.46	.894	11	2	6	546	40	0	4.40	—
NHL totals			16	4	7	1	811	51	0	3.77	.876	—	—	—	—	—	—	—	—
