= Ron Anderson (ice hockey, born 1948) =

Canadian ice hockey player

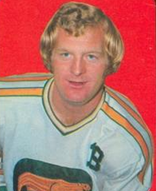
- Anderson in 1972 card
- Born: November 15, 1948 (age 77) Dryden, Ontario, Canada
- Height: 6 ft 0 in (183 cm)
- Weight: 185 lb (84 kg; 13 st 3 lb)
- Position: Defence
- Shot: Left
- Played for: WHA; Chicago Cougars; Cleveland Crusaders
- NHL draft: Undrafted
- Playing career: 1968–1975

Ronald Frank Anderson (born November 15, 1948) is a Canadian retired professional ice hockey defenceman who played 115 games in the World Hockey Association for the Chicago Cougars and Cleveland Crusaders.

== Career statistics ==
=== Regular season and playoffs ===
			Regular season					Playoffs
Season	Team	League	GP	G	A	Pts	PIM	GP	G	A	Pts	PIM
1965–66	Hamilton Red Wings	OHA	6	1	0	1	2	—	—	—	—	—
1966–67	St. Catharines Black Hawks	OHA	46	5	9	14	36	—	—	—	—	—
1967–68	St. Catharines Black Hawks	OHA	54	6	14	20	48	—	—	—	—	—
1968–69	Greensboro Generals	EHL	4	0	1	1	0	—	—	—	—	—
1968–69	Brantford Foresters	WOJAHL	Statistics Unavailable
1968–69	St. Thomas Barons	WOJAHL	Statistics Unavailable
1969–70	Greensboro Generals	EHL	74	15	43	58	49	16	3	3	6	18
1970–71	Greensboro Generals	EHL	72	29	51	80	44	9	4	4	8	2
1971–72	Phoenix Roadrunners	WHL	4	0	1	1	0	—	—	—	—	—
1971–72	Tulsa Oilers	CHL	1	0	0	0	0	—	—	—	—	—
1971–72	Greensboro Generals	EHL	71	13	45	58	98	11	0	5	5	2
1972–73	Chicago Cougars	WHA	74	3	26	29	34	—	—	—	—	—
1973–74	Jacksonville Barons	AHL	21	0	3	3	13	—	—	—	—	—
1973–74	Winston–Salem Polar Twins	SHL	49	28	31	59	33	—	—	—	—	—
1973–74	Chicago Cougars	WHA	2	0	0	0	0	—	—	—	—	—
1974–75	Cape Codders	NAHL	26	1	8	9	14	—	—	—	—	—
1974–75	Cleveland Crusaders	WHA	39	0	9	9	10	—	—	—	—	—
1975–76	Tidewater Sharks	SHL	41	1	14	15	49	—	—	—	—	—
1975–76	Winston–Salem Polar Twins	SHL	27	0	7	7	14	4	0	1	1	2
1976–77	Winston–Salem Polar Twins	SHL	24	1	6	7	10	—	—	—	—	—
1977–78	Brantford Alexanders	OHASr	Statistics Unavailable
1978–79	Welland Steelers	OHASr	Statistics Unavailable
WHA totals			115	3	35	38	44	—	—	—	—	—
