= Darryl Maggs =

Canadian ice hockey player

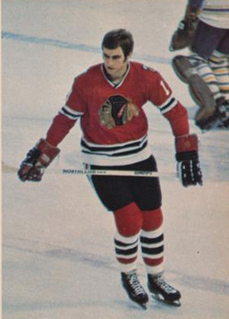
- Born: April 6, 1949 (age 76) Saskatoon, Saskatchewan, Canada
- Height: 6 ft 1 in (185 cm)
- Weight: 195 lb (88 kg; 13 st 13 lb)
- Position: Defence
- Shot: Right
- Played for: Chicago Black Hawks; California Golden Seals; Chicago Cougars; Denver Spurs; Ottawa Civics; Indianapolis Racers; Cincinnati Stingers; Toronto Maple Leafs
- NHL draft: 48th overall, 1969; Chicago Black Hawks
- Playing career: 1970–1980

Darryl John Maggs (born April 6, 1949) is a retired professional ice hockey defenceman who played 135 games in the National Hockey League and 402 games in the World Hockey Association between 1971 and 1980.

== Career ==
During his career, Maggs played for the Chicago Black Hawks, California Golden Seals, Chicago Cougars, Denver Spurs, Ottawa Civics, Indianapolis Racers, Cincinnati Stingers, and Toronto Maple Leafs.

== Personal life ==
He is the brother of Canadian poet Randall Maggs and the uncle of director Adriana Maggs.

== Career statistics ==
=== Regular season and playoffs ===
			Regular season					Playoffs
Season	Team	League	GP	G	A	Pts	PIM	GP	G	A	Pts	PIM
1967–68	Red Deer Rustlers	AJHL	60	6	20	26	50	11	2	3	5	—
1968–69	Calgary Centennials	WCHL	35	9	20	29	55	—	—	—	—	—
1969–70	University of Calgary	CIAU	14	10	15	25	43	4	3	3	6	13
1970–71	Dallas Black Hawks	CHL	71	14	36	50	144	10	5	1	6	23
1971–72	Chicago Black Hawks	NHL	59	7	4	11	4	4	0	0	0	0
1972–73	Chicago Black Hawks	NHL	17	0	0	0	0	—	—	—	—	—
1972–73	California Golden Seals	NHL	54	7	15	22	46	—	—	—	—	—
1973–74	Chicago Cougars	WHA	78	8	22	30	148	18	3	5	8	71
1974–75	Chicago Cougars	WHA	77	6	27	33	137	—	—	—	—	—
1975–76	Denver Spurs/Ottawa Civics	WHA	41	4	23	27	42	—	—	—	—	—
1975–76	Indianapolis Racers	WHA	36	5	16	21	40	7	1	0	1	20
1976–77	Indianapolis Racers	WHA	81	16	55	71	114	9	1	4	5	4
1977–78	Indianapolis Racers	WHA	51	6	15	21	30	—	—	—	—	—
1977–78	Cincinnati Stingers	WHA	11	2	5	7	7	—	—	—	—	—
1978–79	Cincinnati Stingers	WHA	27	4	14	18	63	—	—	—	—	—
1978–79	Mannheimer ERC	GER	11	6	4	10	34	—	—	—	—	—
1979–80	Toronto Maple Leafs	NHL	5	0	0	0	0	—	—	—	—	—
1981–82	SC Langnau	NLA	6	0	1	1	—	—	—	—	—	—
WHA totals			402	51	177	228	581	34	5	9	14	95
NHL totals			135	14	19	33	54	4	0	0	0	0
