= Alan MacKenzie (ice hockey) =

Canadian ice hockey player

- Born: February 2, 1952 (age 74) Windsor, Ontario, Canada
- Height: 5 ft 10 in (178 cm)
- Weight: 175 lb (79 kg; 12 st 7 lb)
- Position: Defence
- Shot: Right
- Played for: WHA; Chicago Cougars; IHL; Fort Wayne Komets; Milwaukee Admirals; NAHL; Long Island Cougars; Erie Blades; Maine Nordiques; Mohawk Valley Comets
- NHL draft: Undrafted
- Playing career: 1972–1980

Alan MacKenzie (born February 2, 1952) is a Canadian former professional ice hockey defenceman.

== Career ==
During the 1973–74 season, MacKenzie played two games in the World Hockey Association with the Chicago Cougars. In the IHL, he played for the Fort Wayne Komets and Milwaukee Admirals.

== Career statistics ==
=== Regular season and playoffs ===
			Regular season					Playoffs
Season	Team	League	GP	G	A	Pts	PIM	GP	G	A	Pts	PIM
1969–70	Hamilton Red Wings	OHA	6	0	0	0	7	—	—	—	—	—
1972–73	Fort Wayne Komets	IHL	8	1	4	5	17	—	—	—	—	—
1972–73	Chicago Warriors	USHL	35	5	27	32	96	—	—	—	—	—
1973–74	Chicago Cougars	WHA	2	0	0	0	0	—	—	—	—	—
1973–74	Long Island Cougars	NAHL	65	8	22	30	123	10	0	1	1	12
1974–75	Long Island Cougars	NAHL	64	17	32	49	50	11	3	4	7	4
1975–76	Erie Blades	NAHL	1	0	0	0	0	—	—	—	—	—
1975–76	Maine Nordiques	NAHL	18	2	4	6	20	—	—	—	—	—
1975–76	Mohawk Valley Comets	NAHL	45	9	19	28	65	4	1	2	3	12
1976–77	Mohawk Valley Comets	NAHL	72	8	52	60	60	3	0	0	0	8
1977–78	Milwaukee Admirals	IHL	69	14	31	45	114	5	1	4	5	2
1978–79	Milwaukee Admirals	IHL	25	2	10	12	42	8	0	0	0	15
1979–80	Milwaukee Admirals	IHL	6	0	1	1	4	—	—	—	—	—
WHA totals			2	0	0	0	0	—	—	—	—	—
