= Rick Morris (ice hockey) =

Canadian ice hockey player

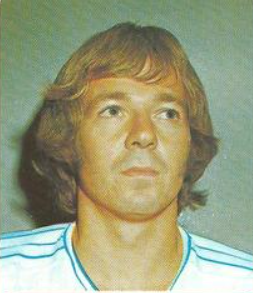
- Morris in 1975 card
- Born: July 5, 1946 Hamilton, Ontario, Canada
- Died: August 25, 1998 (aged 52) Saint-Lazare, Quebec, Canada
- Height: 5 ft 10 in (178 cm)
- Weight: 170 lb (77 kg; 12 st 2 lb)
- Position: Left wing
- Shot: Left
- Played for: Chicago Cougars; Denver Spurs; Ottawa Civics; Edmonton Oilers; Quebec Nordiques Greensboro Generals
- Playing career: 1967–1981

Richard Ian Morris (July 5, 1946 – August 25, 1998) was a Canadian professional ice hockey winger who played 413 games in the World Hockey Association. During his career, he played with the Chicago Cougars, Denver Spurs, Ottawa Civics, Edmonton Oilers, and Quebec Nordiques.

== Career statistics ==
=== Regular season and playoffs ===
			Regular season					Playoffs
Season	Team	League	GP	G	A	Pts	PIM	GP	G	A	Pts	PIM
1964–65	Hamilton Red Wings	OHA	4	0	1	1	0	—	—	—	—	—
1965–66	Hamilton Red Wings	OHA	6	2	0	2	10	—	—	—	—	—
1966–67	Hamilton Red Wings	OHA	48	7	14	21	83	—	—	—	—	—
1967–68	Greensboro Generals	EHL	58	34	36	70	75	11	7	6	13	15
1968–69	Dallas Black Hawks	CHL	64	7	19	26	48	11	2	2	4	18
1969–70	Dallas Black Hawks	CHL	58	9	13	22	77	—	—	—	—	—
1971–72	Laurentian University	CIAU		18	28	46	44	—	—	—	—	—
1972–73	Chicago Cougars	WHA	76	31	17	48	84	—	—	—	—	—
1973–74	Chicago Cougars	WHA	76	17	16	33	140	18	4	3	7	42
1974–75	Chicago Cougars	WHA	78	15	13	28	110	—	—	—	—	—
1975–76	Denver Spurs/Ottawa Civics	WHA	41	9	6	15	58	—	—	—	—	—
1975–76	Edmonton Oilers	WHA	33	11	15	26	52	4	0	1	1	6
1976–77	Edmonton Oilers	WHA	79	18	17	35	76	5	0	1	1	4
1977–78	Edmonton Oilers	WHA	5	1	1	2	7	—	—	—	—	—
1977–78	Quebec Nordiques	WHA	25	0	5	5	40	—	—	—	—	—
1978–79	Welland Steelers	OHASr	—	—	—	—	—	—	—	—	—	—
1980–81	Dundas Merchants	OHASr	—	—	—	—	—	—	—	—	—	—
WHA totals			413	102	90	192	567	27	4	5	9	52
