= Gary Connelly =

Canadian ice hockey player (born 1950)

- Born: December 22, 1950 (age 75) Rouyn-Noranda, Quebec, Canada
- Height: 5 ft 11 in (180 cm)
- Weight: 178 lb (81 kg; 12 st 10 lb)
- Position: Right wing
- Shot: Right
- Played for: WHA; Chicago Cougars
- WHA draft: Undrafted
- Playing career: 1973–1974

Gary Connelly (born December 22, 1950) is a Canadian former professional ice hockey player. During the 1973–74 season, Connelly played 4 games in the World Hockey Association with the Chicago Cougars, scoring no goals and one assist.

== Career statistics ==
			Regular season					Playoffs
Season	Team	League	GP	G	A	Pts	PIM	GP	G	A	Pts	PIM
1969–70	University of Michigan	NCAA	—	—	—	—	—	—	—	—	—	—
1970–71	University of Michigan	NCAA	27	1	4	5	46	—	—	—	—	—
1971–72	University of Michigan	NCAA	15	3	0	3	57	—	—	—	—	—
1972–73	University of Michigan	NCAA	15	7	12	19	60	—	—	—	—	—
1973–74	Long Island Cougars	NAHL-Sr.	72	30	20	50	40	16	2	4	6	2
1973–74	Chicago Cougars	WHA	4	0	1	1	2	—	—	—	—	—
WHA totals			4	0	1	1	2	—	—	—	—	—
