= Richard Coutu =

Canadian ice hockey player

- Born: May 3, 1951 (age 75) Montreal, Quebec, Canada
- Height: 5 ft 11 in (180 cm)
- Weight: 176 lb (80 kg; 12 st 8 lb)
- Position: Goaltender
- Caught: Left
- Played for: WHA; Chicago Cougars; Cincinnati Stingers
- NHL draft: 117th overall, 1971; Minnesota North Stars
- Playing career: 1971–1976

Richard Coutu (born May 3, 1951) is a Canadian former professional ice hockey goaltender. He was selected by the Minnesota North Stars in the fifteenth round (117th overall) of the 1971 NHL Amateur Draft, making him the final pick that year.

Between 1974 and 1976, Coutu played 24 games (9–13–1, 4.11 GAA) in the World Hockey Association. He played for the Chicago Cougars for two seasons and Cincinnati Stingers for one season.

== Career statistics ==
=== Regular season and playoffs ===
			Regular season									Playoffs
Season	Team	League	GP	W	L	T	MIN	GA	SO	GAA	SV%	GP	W	L	MIN	GA	SO	GAA	SV%
1969–70	Rosemont National	QMJHL	35	–	–	–	–	160	1	4.62	.898
1970–71	Rosemont National	QMJHL	55	–	–	–	–	295	1	5.36	.883	–	–	–	–	–	–	–	–
1971–72	Toledo Hornets	IHL	Statistics Unavailable
1971–72	Cleveland Barons	AHL	1	–	–	–	18	1	0	3.33	–	–	–	–	–	–	–	–	–
1972–73	Bridgeport Home Oilers	Can-Am	Statistics Unavailable
1973–74	Long Island Cougars	NAHL	27	15	9	1	1556	90	2	3.47	–	10	–	–	–	–	–	–	–
1973–74	Chicago Cougars	WHA	20	9	10	1	1207	75	0	3.73	.881	–	–	–	–	–	–	–	–
1974–75	Long Island Cougars	NAHL	49	20	22	3	2835	153	4	3.24	–	2	–	–	–	–	–	–	–
1974–75	Chicago Cougars	WHA	1	0	1	0	60	5	0	5.00	.861	–	–	–	–	–	–	–	–
1975–76	Cincinnati Stingers	WHA	3	0	2	0	149	17	0	6.85	.790	–	–	–	–	–	–	–	–
1975–76	Hampton Gulls	SHL	29	11	11	7	1676	105	3	3.76	.899	4	2	1	191	11	0	3.46	.916
WHA totals			24	9	13	1	1416	97	0	4.11	.870	—	—	—	—	—	—	—	—
