= Brian Glenwright =

Brian Joseph Glenwright
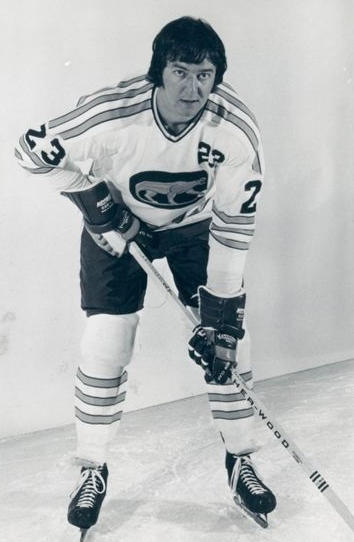
- Brian Glenwright, 1972
- Born: October 8, 1949 Windsor, Ontario, Canada
- Died: August 5, 2006 (aged 56) Sault Ste. Marie, Ontario, Canada
- Height: 6 ft 3 in (191 cm)
- Weight: 200 lb (91 kg; 14 st 4 lb)
- Position: Left wing
- Shot: Left
- Played for: Kansas City Blues; Montreal Voyageurs; Denver Spurs; Chicago Cougars; Long Island Cougars; Saginaw Gears; Columbus Owls
- NHL draft: 54th overall, 1969; St. Louis Blues
- Playing career: 1969–1976

Brian Joseph Glenwright (October 8, 1949 - August 5, 2006) was a professional ice hockey player who played between the years of 1969-1976. Prior to moving to a full-time hockey career, he attended Dartmouth College. Glenwright was best known for playing 65 games in the World Hockey Association (WHA) for the Chicago Cougars. Glenwright went by the nicknames "Glennie" and "Wimpy."

== Hockey career ==
Glenwright played in the 1961 Quebec International Pee-Wee Hockey Tournament with Sault Sainte Marie.

Glenwright's professional hockey career began in 1969. After playing with the Kitchener Rangers in the Ontario Hockey Association (OHA), he was drafted in the fifth round by the St. Louis Blues in the 1969 NHL Amateur Draft as the 54th overall pick. After being evaluated by a team doctor, he was loaned to the American Hockey League (AHL) for the 1970-71 season. Glenwright did not play in the NHL. Brian was selected by the Chicago Cougars of the World Hockey Association (WHA) in the 1972 WHA General Player Draft, which took place in February of that year.

Glenwright's proudest hockey moment was his assist on the goal that took the series in game five versus Portland Buckaroos while playing with the 1971-72 Denver Spurs in the Western Hockey League (WHL). Following his time with the Spurs, he signed a contract with the Chicago Cougars for the 1972 season. Due to a partially ruptured left triceps muscle, Glenwright missed 11 games during the 1972-73 season. Additionally, he missed a large portion of the 1973-74 season due to a slipped disc in his back, and had to have surgery for this injury.

== Family ==
Brian is the son of Jim Glenwright, a minor-league hockey coach, WHA scout, and co-creator of the Soo Pee Wee Arena Foundation. Jim Glenwright is enshrined in the Sault Ste. Marie Hockey Hall of Fame. The Northern Ontario Hockey Association presents a "Jim Glenwright Trophy" for players in the Minor PeeWee "AAA" category.

Glenwright was married twice. His first wife, Linda, was a horse trainer, and together they had two children. His second wife, Patty, was an insurance agent and homemaker.

== Post-hockey career ==
During his hockey career, Glenwright obtained a real estate license in the province of Ontario in 1973. Following his departure from hockey, he purchased his father Jim's farm, which contained horses, to which he took a fancy. Glenwright also worked for China Steel, a steel fabricator, in Sault Ste. Marie, and worked in the stores department at Algoma Steel.

Shortly after his second daughter was born, Glenwright and his first wife Linda moved to Colorado, as Linda wanted to be closer to horse culture. After a few years, Glenwright and his family moved to the Phoenix, Arizona area, where he managed a Goodyear Tire store. Glenwright moved back to Sault Ste. Marie in 1996. He spent his remaining days as a furniture salesman.

== Death ==
Brian Glenwright died following an accident while swimming in the Goulais River in Northern Ontario.

== Career statistics ==
=== Regular season and playoffs ===
			Regular season					Playoffs
Season	Team	League	GP	G	A	Pts	PIM	GP	G	A	Pts	PIM
1968–69	Kitchener Rangers	OHA	48	17	20	37	10	—	—	—	—	—
1969–70	Kansas City Blues	CHL	41	11	2	13	39	—	—	—	—	—
1970–71	Kansas City Blues	CHL	43	11	13	24	13	—	—	—	—	—
1970–71	Montreal Voyageurs	AHL	16	3	2	5	2	1	0	0	0	0
1971–72	Denver Spurs	WHL	65	21	20	41	28	9	2	1	3	6
1972–73	Chicago Cougars	WHA	50	2	7	9	0	—	—	—	—	—
1973–74	Long Island Cougars	NAHL	2	0	4	4	4	—	—	—	—	—
1973–74	Chicago Cougars	WHA	15	3	2	5	0	—	—	—	—	—
1974–75	Kenosha Flyers	CnHL	Statistics Unavailable
1974–75	Saginaw Gears	IHL	16	11	7	18	10	15	4	6	10	12
1975–76	Saginaw Gears	IHL	15	0	5	5	4	—	—	—	—	—
1975–76	Columbus Owls	IHL	37	18	13	31	23	—	—	—	—	—
WHA totals			65	5	9	14	0	—	—	—	—	—
