= John Shmyr =

Canadian ice hockey player

- Born: January 2, 1945 Cudworth, Saskatchewan, Canada
- Died: November 11, 2006 (aged 61) British Columbia, Canada
- Height: 6 ft 0 in (183 cm)
- Weight: 170 lb (77 kg; 12 st 2 lb)
- Position: Defenceman
- Shot: Left
- Played for: Winnipeg Jets; Chicago Cougars; Vancouver Blazers
- Playing career: 1971–1975

John Shmyr (January 2, 1945 - November 11, 2006) was a Canadian professional ice hockey player who played 89 games in the World Hockey Association for the Winnipeg Jets, Chicago Cougars and Vancouver Blazers. His brother Paul Shmyr, had a long career playing in the National Hockey League and WHA.

== Career statistics ==
=== Regular season and playoffs ===
			Regular season					Playoffs
Season	Team	League	GP	G	A	Pts	PIM	GP	G	A	Pts	PIM
1971–72	Seattle Totems	WHL	5	0	1	1	2	—	—	—	—	—
1972–73	Winnipeg Jets	WHA	7	0	0	0	2	3	0	1	1	2
1973–74	Chicago Cougars	WHA	43	1	3	4	13	—	—	—	—	—
1974–75	Vancouver Blazers	WHA	39	1	5	6	43	—	—	—	—	—
WHA totals			89	2	8	10	58	3	0	1	1	2
