= Rod Zaine =

Canadian ice hockey player (1946–2022)

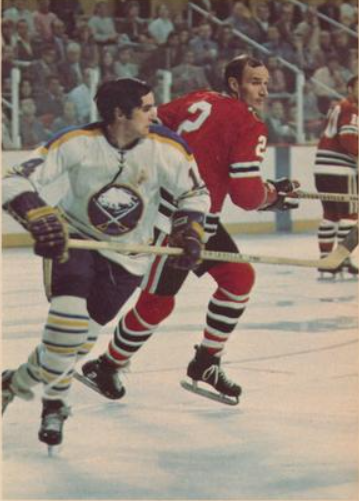
- Zaine in 1971 photo for Buffalo Sabres
- Born: May 18, 1946 Ottawa, Ontario, Canada
- Died: July 7, 2022 (aged 76) Ottawa, Ontario, Canada
- Height: 5 ft 10 in (178 cm)
- Weight: 179 lb (81 kg; 12 st 11 lb)
- Position: Centre
- Shot: Left
- Played for: Pittsburgh Penguins; Buffalo Sabres; Chicago Cougars
- Playing career: 1969–1975

Rodney Carl Zaine (May 18, 1946 – July 7, 2022) was a Canadian professional ice hockey player who played two seasons in the National Hockey League (NHL). He played for the Pittsburgh Penguins and Buffalo Sabres from 1970 to 1972. He later played for the Chicago Cougars of the World Hockey Association from 1972 to 1975.

== Early life ==
Zaine was born in Ottawa on May 18, 1946. He attended Rideau High School in his hometown, where he was quarterback and safety on its Canadian football team that won three municipal championships, and scored the championship-winning single in November 1962. He began his junior career by playing for the Oshawa Generals of the Ontario Hockey League (OHL) during the 1963–64 season, before joining the Ottawa Montagnards and Smiths Falls Bears. He then played two seasons for the Clinton Comets of the Eastern Hockey League (EHL) from 1966 to 1968. Zaine played the 1968–69 season with the Ottawa Nationals.

== Career ==
Zaine signed with the Baltimore Clippers of the American Hockey League (AHL) in October 1969. Over the next two seasons, he scored 20 goals and 25 assists in 61 games played. He was later traded to the Pittsburgh Penguins in July 1970 for cash considerations and was assigned to its Amarillo Wranglers affiliate.

Zaine made his National Hockey League (NHL) debut for the Penguins on November 4, 1970, against the Vancouver Canucks at the Civic Arena. After appearing in four games, he did not play in the NHL between November 10 and December 31, 1970, when he was recalled from the Wranglers after Ken Schinkel suffered a broken collarbone.

During his rookie season, Zaine scored eight goals and recorded five assists in 37 games played for the Penguins. He was subsequently claimed by the Buffalo Sabres in the Intra-League Draft on June 8, 1971. He went on to have two goals and one assist in 24 games with the franchise. Zaine was drafted by the Chicago Cougars of the World Hockey Association on February 12, 1972. In his three seasons with the team, he scored 11 goals and added 33 assists in 219 games. He also briefly co-owned the Cougars with Pat Stapleton, Ralph Backstrom, and Dave Dryden. He later served as field manager of the Northumberland Whiskey Jacks baseball team in Cobourg, leading them to the Canada–New York league playoff title in 1998.

== Personal life ==
Zaine had five children. He resided at a retirement home in Ottawa during his later years.

Zaine died on July 7, 2022, at Queensway Carleton Hospital in Ottawa. He was 76 years old.

== Career statistics ==
=== Regular season and playoffs ===
			Regular season					Playoffs
Season	Team	League	GP	G	A	Pts	PIM	GP	G	A	Pts	PIM
1963–64	Oshawa Generals	OHA	55	6	11	17	32	2	0	0	0	0
1964–65	Ottawa Montagnards	CJHL	24	18	31	49	56	—	—	—	—	—
1965–66	Smiths Falls Bears	CJHL	34	35	56	91	46	—	—	—	—	—
1966–67	Clinton Comets	EHL	72	13	23	36	16	9	1	3	4	0
1967–68	Clinton Comets	EHL	72	24	53	77	68	14	5	7	12	5
1968–69	Ottawa Nationals	OHA Sr	6	3	1	4	4	—	—	—	—	—
1969–70	Baltimore Clippers	AHL	53	19	23	42	36	5	1	2	3	4
1970–71	Baltimore Clippers	AHL	8	1	2	3	4	—	—	—	—	—
1970–71	Amarillo Wranglers	CHL	27	4	11	15	20	—	—	—	—	—
1970–71	Pittsburgh Penguins	NHL	37	8	5	13	21	—	—	—	—	—
1971–72	Cincinnati Swords	AHL	32	8	15	23	6	10	5	5	10	10
1971–72	Buffalo Sabres	NHL	24	2	1	3	4	—	—	—	—	—
1972–73	Chicago Cougars	WHA	74	3	14	17	25	—	—	—	—	—
1973–74	Chicago Cougars	WHA	77	5	13	18	17	18	2	1	3	2
1974–75	Chicago Cougars	WHA	68	3	6	9	16	—	—	—	—	—
WHA totals			219	11	33	44	58	18	2	1	3	2
NHL totals			61	10	6	16	25	—	—	—	—	—
