= Rosaire Paiement =

Canadian ice hockey player

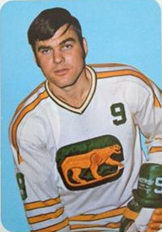
- Born: August 12, 1945 (age 80) Earlton, Ontario, Canada
- Height: 6 ft 01 in (185 cm)
- Weight: 180 lb (82 kg; 12 st 12 lb)
- Position: Centre
- Shot: Right
- Played for: Philadelphia Flyers; Vancouver Canucks; Chicago Cougars (WHA); New England Whalers (WHA); Indianapolis Racers (WHA)
- Playing career: 1967–1978

Joseph Rosaire Wilfrid Paiement (born August 12, 1945) is a Canadian former professional ice hockey forward. He is the older brother of Wilf Paiement.

Paiement started his National Hockey League career with the Philadelphia Flyers in 1967. He also played for the Vancouver Canucks. He left the NHL after the 1972 season to play in the World Hockey Association. There, he played for the Chicago Cougars, New England Whalers, and Indianapolis Racers.

== Career statistics ==
=== Regular season and playoffs ===
			Regular season					Playoffs
Season	Team	League	GP	G	A	Pts	PIM	GP	G	A	Pts	PIM
1964–65	Niagara Falls Flyers	OHA	56	13	24	37	40	9	0	2	2	5
1965–66	Niagara Falls Flyers	OHA	47	14	25	39	38	6	0	1	1	10
1966–67	Jersey Devils	EHL	72	61	64	125	175	16	3	11	14	53
1967–68	Philadelphia Flyers	NHL	7	1	0	1	11	3	3	0	3	0
1967–68	Quebec Aces	AHL	64	18	30	48	189	12	4	6	10	41
1968–69	Philadelphia Flyers	NHL	27	2	4	6	52	—	—	—	—	—
1968–69	Quebec Aces	AHL	42	16	22	38	122	15	9	5	14	35
1969–70	Philadelphia Flyers	NHL	9	1	1	2	11	—	—	—	—	—
1969–70	Quebec Aces	AHL	67	28	40	68	242	6	1	1	2	15
1970–71	Vancouver Canucks	NHL	78	34	28	62	152	—	—	—	—	—
1971–72	Vancouver Canucks	NHL	69	10	19	29	117	—	—	—	—	—
1972–73	Chicago Cougars	WHA	78	33	36	69	137	—	—	—	—	—
1973–74	Chicago Cougars	WHA	78	30	43	73	87	18	9	6	15	16
1974–75	Chicago Cougars	WHA	78	26	48	74	97	—	—	—	—	—
1975–76	New England Whalers	WHA	80	28	43	71	89	17	4	11	15	41
1976–77	New England Whalers	WHA	13	5	2	7	12	—	—	—	—	—
1976–77	Indianapolis Racers	WHA	67	18	25	43	91	9	0	5	5	15
1977–78	Indianapolis Racers	WHA	61	6	24	30	81	—	—	—	—	—
OHA totals			103	27	49	76	78	15	0	3	3	15
AHL totals			173	62	92	154	553	33	14	12	26	91
NHL totals			190	48	52	100	343	3	0	3	3	0
WHA totals			455	146	221	367	594	44	13	22	35	72
