= Duke Harris =

Canadian ice hockey player

- Born: February 25, 1942 Sarnia, Ontario, Canada
- Died: August 2, 2017 (aged 75) Sarnia, Ontario, Canada
- Height: 5 ft 10 in (178 cm)
- Weight: 180 lb (82 kg; 12 st 12 lb)
- Position: Right wing
- Shot: Right
- Played for: Minnesota North Stars; Toronto Maple Leafs; Chicago Cougars; Houston Aeros
- Playing career: 1961–1975

George Francis "Duke" Harris (February 25, 1942 – August 2, 2017) was a Canadian professional ice hockey right winger who played 26 games in the National Hockey League during the 1967–68 season with the Minnesota North Stars and Toronto Maple Leafs. He also played in the WHA from 1972 to 1975 with the Chicago Cougars and Houston Aeros. He died in 2017, six months after heart surgery.

== Early life ==
Harris grew up in Point Edward, Ontario. He played 5 seasons with the St. Catharines Teepees, starting his first season in 1958 at the age of 16. In the 1960 season with the Teepees Harris helped the team win the Memorial Cup against the Edmonton Oil Kings. In the 1961–62 season he played with the Guelph Royals

== Professional career ==
In 1961–62 Harris played his first professional games, appearing in 7 games with the Sault Thunderbirds of the Eastern Professional Hockey League (EPHL). in 1962–63 he scored 28 goals as an EPHL's St. Louis Braves.

=== NHL career ===
Harris played 26 NHL games in 1967–68, 22 with the Minnesota North Stars. He was traded to the Toronto Maple Leafs during the season, where he played 4 more games. The rest of the season was spent in the minor leagues.

=== Post-NHL career ===
After the NHL Harris played two seasons with the Vancouver Canucks of the Western Hockey League. In the 1968–69 season Harris scored 23 goals and had 17 assists for a total of 40 points. He also played 3 non-consecutive seasons with the Rochester Americans in the American Hockey League, 1967–68, 1970–71, and 1971–72.

=== World Hockey Association ===
In 1972 Harris joined the Houston Aeros of the newly founded World Hockey Association (WHA). He scored 30 goals for Houston during the 1972–73 season. He then played two seasons with the Chicago Cougars before retiring in 1975.

== Personal life ==
Harris was married for 55 years, until his death, to Eleanor Marie Harris. They had two children, Kimberly Marie Harris and Robert Harris.

After retiring from professional hockey Harris worked as a crane operator in Sarnia, Ontario.

== Career statistics ==
=== Regular season and playoffs ===
			Regular season					Playoffs
Season	Team	League	GP	G	A	Pts	PIM	GP	G	A	Pts	PIM
1958–59	St. Catharines Teepees	OHA	51	11	16	27	26	7	0	1	1	0
1959–60	St. Catharines Teepees	OHA	48	16	26	42	19	16	6	6	12	30
1959–60	St. Catharines Teepees	M-Cup	—	—	—	—	—	14	5	13	18	4
1960–61	St. Catharines Teepees	OHA	48	15	22	37	30	6	0	3	3	4
1961–62	St. Catharines Teepees	OHA	9	5	0	5	8	—	—	—	—	—
1961–62	Guelph Royals	OHA	39	23	37	60	50	—	—	—	—	—
1961–62	Sault Thunderbirds	EPHL	7	0	0	0	0	—	—	—	—	—
1962–63	St. Louis Braves	EPHL	72	28	31	59	38	—	—	—	—	—
1963–64	St. Louis Braves	CHL	72	21	41	62	16	6	1	3	4	4
1964–65	Pittsburgh Hornets	AHL	72	19	31	50	16	4	0	3	3	6
1965–66	Pittsburgh Hornets	AHL	72	18	23	41	12	3	1	1	2	2
1966–67	Pittsburgh Hornets	AHL	70	27	27	54	24	9	1	3	4	4
1967–68	Minnesota North Stars	NHL	22	1	4	5	4	—	—	—	—	—
1967–68	Toronto Maple Leafs	NHL	4	0	0	0	0	—	—	—	—	—
1967–68	Fort Worth Wings	CHL	3	1	1	2	0	—	—	—	—	—
1967–68	Rochester Americans	AHL	38	10	27	37	12	10	2	3	5	4
1968–69	Vancouver Canucks	WHL	74	23	17	40	18	8	3	0	3	2
1969–70	Vancouver Canucks	WHL	71	20	21	41	23	11	6	3	9	4
1970–71	Rochester Americans	AHL	70	29	25	54	42	—	—	—	—	—
1971–72	Rochester Americans	AHL	74	27	34	61	24	—	—	—	—	—
1972–73	Houston Aeros	WHA	75	30	12	42	14	10	1	1	2	4
1973–74	Chicago Cougars	WHA	64	14	16	30	20	18	6	6	12	2
1974–75	Chicago Cougars	WHA	54	9	19	28	18	—	—	—	—	—
WHA totals			193	53	47	100	52	28	7	7	14	6
NHL totals			26	1	4	5	4	—	—	—	—	—
