= Ed Hatoum =

Canadian ice hockey player

- Born: December 7, 1947 (age 78) Beirut, Lebanon
- Height: 5 ft 10 in (178 cm)
- Weight: 180 lb (82 kg; 12 st 12 lb)
- Position: Right wing
- Shot: Right
- Played for: Vancouver Blazers; Chicago Cougars; Vancouver Canucks; Detroit Red Wings
- Playing career: 1968–1974

Edward Hatoum (Arabic: إدوارد حاطوم; born December 7, 1947) is a Lebanese-born Canadian former professional ice hockey forward. He played 47 games in the National Hockey League (NHL) between 1968 and 1971, and 53 games in the World Hockey Association (WHA) between 1972 and 1974. Born in Lebanon, Hatoum moved to Canada in 1956 and began playing hockey at that time. He played junior with the Hamilton Red Wings before joining the Detroit Red Wings of the NHL in 1968. He joined the Vancouver Canucks in 1970 and moved to the WHA when it was established in 1972, playing for the Chicago Cougars and Vancouver Blazers.

== Playing career ==
Hatoum was born in Beirut, Lebanon and moved to Canada when he was 9 years old. His father and brother had moved to Canada first in 1954, and Hatoum and the rest of his family followed, settling in Ottawa, Ontario. Soon after arriving to Canada, he began playing hockey.

The first player born in Lebanon to play in the NHL, Hatoum started his National Hockey League career with the Detroit Red Wings. He also played with the Vancouver Canucks as well as the Chicago Cougars and Vancouver Blazers of the World Hockey Association. His career lasted from 1969 to 1971.

== Post-playing career ==
After retiring from hockey (and coaching the Nelson Maple Leafs), Hatoum worked in the auto body business in Ottawa and more recently, in auto wholesale in Vancouver.

== Career statistics ==
=== Regular season and playoffs ===
			Regular season					Playoffs
Season	Team	League	GP	G	A	Pts	PIM	GP	G	A	Pts	PIM
1963–64	Ottawa Jr. Montagnards	OCJHL	—	—	—	—	—	—	—	—	—	—
1964–65	Hamilton Red Wings	OHA	17	0	3	3	8	—	—	—	—	—
1965–66	Hamilton Red Wings	OHA	48	16	35	51	51	5	0	3	3	2
1966–67	Hamilton Red Wings	OHA	45	19	25	44	89	17	5	11	16	16
1967–68	Hamilton Red Wings	OHA	50	25	34	59	44	11	6	5	11	10
1967–68	Fort Worth Wings	CHL	—	—	—	—	—	7	0	1	1	0
1968–69	Detroit Red Wings	NHL	16	2	1	3	2	—	—	—	—	—
1968–69	Fort Worth Wings	CHL	53	21	28	49	29	—	—	—	—	—
1968–69	Baltimore Clippers	AHL	3	0	1	1	2	4	1	1	2	0
1969–70	Detroit Red Wings	NHL	5	0	2	2	2	—	—	—	—	—
1969–70	Fort Worth Wings	CHL	69	15	40	55	32	6	2	3	5	0
1970–71	Vancouver Canucks	NHL	26	1	3	4	21	—	—	—	—	—
1970–71	Seattle Totems	WHL	29	8	13	21	19	—	—	—	—	—
1971–72	Rochester Americans	AHL	67	9	23	32	29	—	—	—	—	—
1972–73	Chicago Cougars	WHA	16	1	1	2	2	—	—	—	—	—
1972–73	Seattle Totems	WHL	45	11	26	37	14	—	—	—	—	—
1973–74	Vancouver Blazers	WHA	37	3	12	15	8	—	—	—	—	—
1973–74	San Diego Gulls	WHL	5	1	0	1	4	—	—	—	—	—
1974–75	Nelson Maple Leafs	WIHL	48	25	53	78	18	—	—	—	—	—
1975–76	Nelson Maple Leafs	WIHL	4	0	3	3	0	—	—	—	—	—
WHA totals			53	4	13	17	10	—	—	—	—	—
NHL totals			47	3	6	9	25	—	—	—	—	—

- All statistics taken from NHL.com
