= Andre Gill (ice hockey) =

Canadian ice hockey player

- Born: September 19, 1941; Sorel, Quebec, Canada
- Died: December 2, 2014 (aged 73); Sorel-Tracy, Quebec, Canada
- Height: 5 ft 7 in (170 cm)
- Weight: 145 lb (66 kg; 10 st 5 lb)
- Position: Goaltender
- Shot: Left
- Played for: Boston Bruins
- Playing career: 1967–1974

Andre Marcel "Cannon" Gill (September 19, 1941 – December 2, 2014) was a Canadian professional ice hockey goaltender.

== Career ==
Gill played most of his career in the American Hockey League for the Boston Bruins minor league affiliate of the time, the Hershey Bears, being recalled to the Bruins once for a five-game stand. He later played two seasons with the Chicago Cougars of the World Hockey Association, from 1972 to 1974. He died in 2014.

== Career statistics ==
=== Regular season and playoffs ===
			Regular season									Playoffs
Season	Team	League	GP	W	L	T	MIN	GA	SO	GAA	SV%	GP	W	L	MIN	GA	SO	GAA	SV%
1960–61	Sorel Royals	MMJHL	41	—	—	—	2460	197	1	4.80	—	—	—	—	—	—	—	—	—
1961–62	Sorel Royals	MMJHL	—	—	—	—	—	—	—	—	—	—	—	—	—	—	—	—	—
1962–63	Hershey Bears	AHL	4	2	2	0	240	12	0	3.00	—	—	—	—	—	—	—	—	—
1963–64	Minneapolis Bruins	CHL	5	4	1	0	300	16	0	3.20	—	—	—	—	—	—	—	—	—
1963–64	Hershey Bears	AHL	19	5	9	2	1000	60	0	3.60	—	—	—	—	—	—	—	—	—
1964–65	Hershey Bears	AHL	7	2	4	0	369	25	0	4.07	—	—	—	—	—	—	—	—	—
1965–66	Hershey Bears	AHL	18	6	9	0	966	55	1	3.42	—	—	—	—	—	—	—	—	—
1966–67	Hershey Bears	AHL	56	28	18	10	3334	161	4	2.90	—	—	—	—	—	—	—	—	—
1967–68	Boston Bruins	NHL	5	3	1	0	270	13	1	2.89	.903	—	—	—	—	—	—	—	—
1967–68	Hershey Bears	AHL	46	23	17	5	2564	134	2	3.14	—	5	1	4	307	15	0	2.93	—
1968–69	Hershey Bears	AHL	27	15	10	2	1548	83	0	3.22	—	—	—	—	—	—	—	—	—
1969–70	Hershey Bears	AHL	52	—	—	—	3043	161	1	3.17	—	7	3	4	441	20	0	2.72	—
1970–71	Hershey Bears	AHL	40	18	14	8	2284	102	4	2.67	—	4	1	3	240	16	0	4.00	—
1971–72	Hershey Bears	AHL	40	17	13	9	2310	114	2	2.96	—	3	0	3	194	13	0	4.02	—
1972–73	Chicago Cougars	WHA	33	4	24	0	1709	118	0	4.14	.880	—	—	—	—	—	—	—	—
1973–74	Chicago Cougars	WHA	13	4	7	2	803	46	0	3.44	.890	11	6	5	614	38	0	3.71	—
1973–74	Long Island Cougars	NAHL	18	9	8	1	1138	50	2	2.64	—	5	—	—	286	13	0	2.73	—
1974–75	Hampton Gulls	SHL	24	13	10	0	1406	70	1	2.99	.905	11	—	—	660	39	1	3.55	—
1976–77	Richmond Wildcats	SHL	17	8	7	0	884	53	0	3.60	.883	—	—	—	—	—	—	—	—
WHA totals			46	8	31	2	2512	164	0	3.92	.883	11	6	5	614	38	0	3.71	—
NHL totals			5	3	1	0	271	13	1	2.89	.903	—	—	—	—	—	—	—	—
