= Reg Fleming =

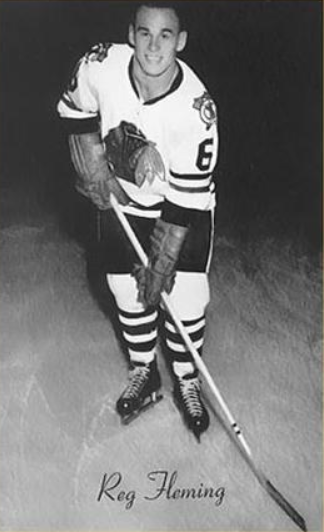
- Fleming in 1960s photo for Chicago Black Hawks
- Born: April 21, 1936 Montreal, Quebec, Canada
- Died: July 11, 2009 (aged 73) Arlington Heights, Illinois, U.S.
- Height: 5 ft 10 in (178 cm)
- Weight: 190 lb (86 kg; 13 st 8 lb)
- Position: Defence; Left Wing
- Shot: Left
- Played for: Montreal Canadiens; Chicago Black Hawks; Boston Bruins; New York Rangers; Philadelphia Flyers; Buffalo Sabres; Chicago Cougars
- Playing career: 1956–1978

Reginald Stephen "Reggie, the Ruffian" Fleming (April 21, 1936 – July 11, 2009) was a professional hockey player in the National Hockey League with the Montreal Canadiens, Chicago Black Hawks, Boston Bruins, New York Rangers, Philadelphia Flyers and Buffalo Sabres. He also played for the Chicago Cougars of the World Hockey Association, as well as with a number of minor league teams in other professional leagues. His professional career spanned over 20 years. He was known as an aggressive and combative player who could play both forward and defence, as well as kill penalties.

== Before the NHL ==
After a junior career during which he spent two seasons with the Montreal Junior Canadiens of the Quebec Junior Hockey League (QJHL) and one year with St. Michael's of the Ontario Hockey Association (OHA), Fleming began his minor-pro career in the Habs' farm system with Shawinigan of the Quebec Senior Hockey League, followed by stops in Rochester of the American Hockey League and Kingston of the Eastern Professional Hockey League. His rugged style of play earned him a three-game tryout with the Canadiens late in the 1959-60 NHL season. That summer Montreal and the Chicago Black Hawks made a nine-player trade which made Fleming a member of the Black Hawks.

== Pro career ==
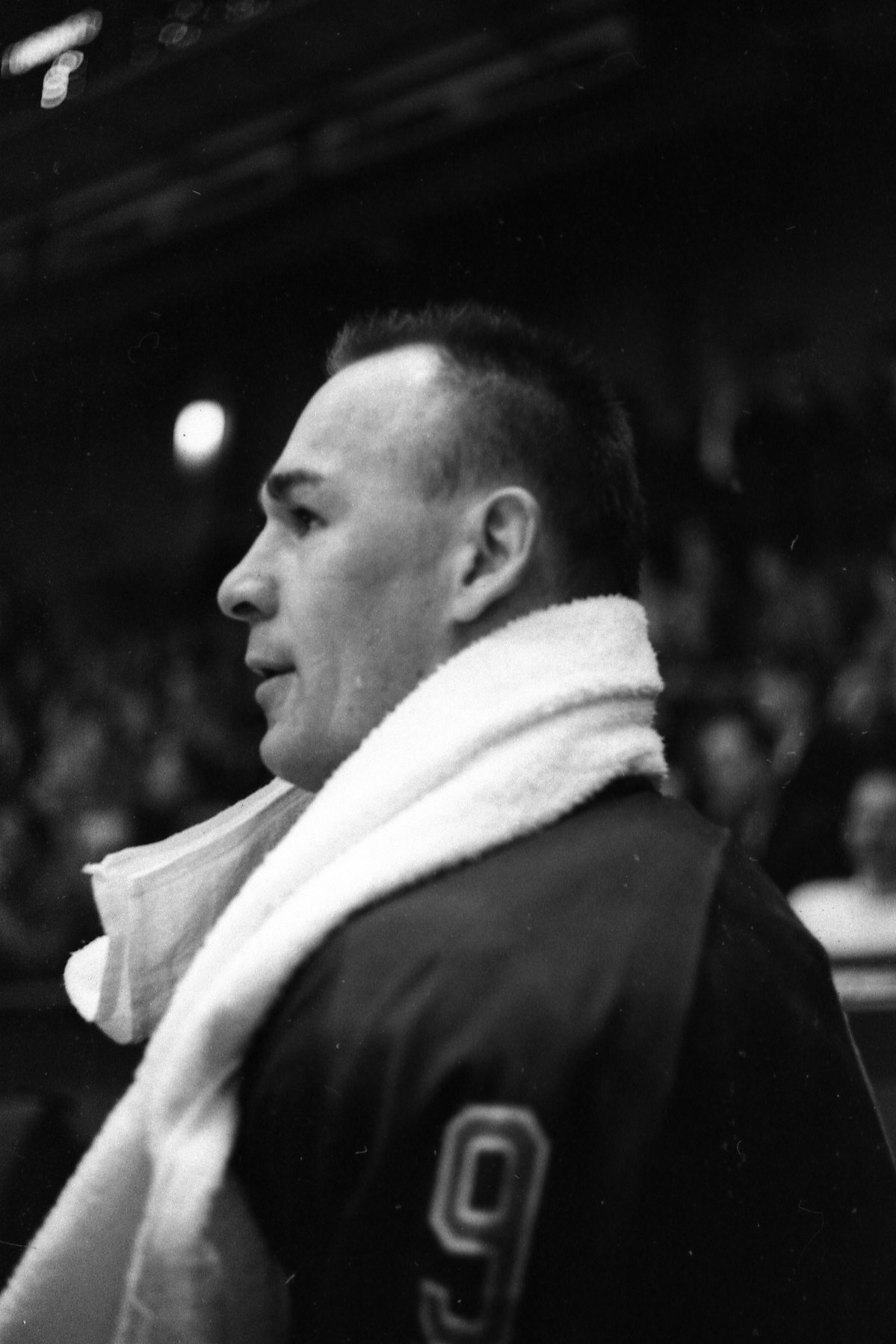
Reg Fleming in the penalty box at Madison Square Garden, circa 1965

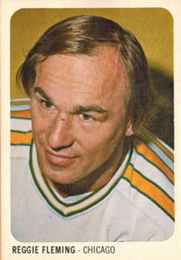
1973-74 Quaker Oats card of Fleming for Chicago Cougars

Fleming played four full seasons on a talented Chicago club alongside stars like Bobby Hull, Stan Mikita, Glenn Hall and Pierre Pilote. Fleming's aggressive style of play added an important physical presence to the Blackhawks and helped the team win the Stanley Cup for the 1960–61 season, which was Fleming's first in Chicago. Fleming scored an important goal in the final game of the NHL finals against Detroit that year. He assisted on Bobby Hull's 50th goal the following season, helping Hull match the NHL record. A popular player with Chicago, he was known for his grit and team spirit. His involvement in a number of notorious incidents gave him a reputation around the league as a tough customer and an intense competitor.

Prior to the 1964–65 season, Chicago dealt Fleming to the Boston Bruins. Boston primarily used Fleming as a forward and he recorded personal highs of 18 goals and 23 assists for the 1964–65 season. Midway through the next season, he was traded to the New York Rangers. He would spend the remainder of that year and the following three with a rapidly improving Ranger club. Although a popular and consistent performer with the Rangers, he was sent to the Philadelphia Flyers for the 1969–70 season. His experience and combativeness helped the small and unaggressive Flyers team. Left unprotected in the 1970 expansion draft, Fleming joined the Buffalo Sabres, where he recorded his career high in penalty minutes in 1970–71, his last NHL season. Subsequently he was dropped and reclaimed five separate times by the Sabres in the 1971 NHL intra-league draft due to a loophole the team thus exploited.

After minor league stints with the Cincinnati Swords (AHL) and the Salt Lake Golden Eagles (WHL) in 1971–72, Fleming returned to Chicago, joining the Cougars of the newly formed WHA. After scoring 23 goals and playing his usual rugged style in 1972–73, injuries began to reduce his effectiveness the following season, his final season in the WHA. After playing for a few more seasons in the minors in the mid-western United States, Fleming retired in 1978.

== Death ==
While recovering from a stroke and heart attack Fleming resided at the Claremont Rehab and Living Center for 5 years where he died. During this time his son, Chris Fleming, filmed his situation and conversations in the hope of reaching his father's fans through YouTube and the internet. Touchingly, they documented Fleming's battle with ill-health and attempt to recollect his fondest memories. Fleming died at Northwest Community Hospital in Arlington Heights, Illinois on July 11, 2009. Six months after his death, neuropathologists at Boston University disclosed that he had chronic traumatic encephalopathy (C.T.E.). He was the first hockey player known to have been tested for the disease, which had been mainly associated with boxing and American football. He has two surviving children Chris Fleming and Kelly Fleming.

== Career statistics ==
=== Regular season and playoffs ===
Bold indicates led league

			Regular season					Playoffs
Season	Team	League	GP	G	A	Pts	PIM	GP	G	A	Pts	PIM
1953–54	Montreal Jr. Canadiens	QJHL	48	7	7	14	47	8	0	0	0	4
1954–55	Montreal Jr. Canadiens	QJHL	44	3	11	14	139	5	0	0	0	11
1955–56	St. Michael's Majors	OHA	42	1	8	9	93	8	0	2	2	18
1956–57	Shawinigan-Falls Cataracts	QHL	61	2	9	11	109	—	—	—	—	—
1957–58	Shawinigan-Falls Cataracts	QHL	51	6	15	21	227	8	3	2	5	16
1958–59	Rochester Americans	AHL	70	6	16	22	112	5	0	1	1	13
1959–60	Montreal Canadiens	NHL	3	0	0	0	2	—	—	—	—	—
1959–60	Rochester Americans	AHL	9	1	5	6	4	—	—	—	—	—
1959–60	Kingston Frontenacs	EPHL	52	19	49	68	91	—	—	—	—	—
1960–61	Chicago Black Hawks	NHL	66	4	4	8	145	**12**	1	0	1	12
1961–62	Chicago Black Hawks	NHL	**70**	7	9	16	71	**12**	2	2	4	27
1962–63	Chicago Black Hawks	NHL	64	7	7	14	99	6	0	0	0	27
1963–64	Chicago Black Hawks	NHL	61	3	6	9	140	7	0	0	0	18
1964–65	Boston Bruins	NHL	67	18	23	41	136	—	—	—	—	—
1965–66	Boston Bruins	NHL	34	4	6	10	**42**	—	—	—	—	—
1965–66	New York Rangers	NHL	35	10	14	24	**124**	—	—	—	—	—
1966–67	New York Rangers	NHL	61	15	16	31	146	4	0	2	2	11
1967–68	New York Rangers	NHL	73	17	7	24	132	6	0	2	2	4
1968–69	New York Rangers	NHL	72	8	12	20	138	3	0	0	0	7
1969–70	Philadelphia Flyers	NHL	65	9	18	27	134	—	—	—	—	—
1970–71	Buffalo Sabres	NHL	78	6	10	16	159	—	—	—	—	—
1971–72	Salt Lake Golden Eagles	WHL	56	20	28	48	134	—	—	—	—	—
1971–72	Cincinnati Swords	AHL	11	3	5	8	62	—	—	—	—	—
1972–73	Chicago Cougars	WHA	74	23	45	68	95	—	—	—	—	—
1973–74	Chicago Cougars	WHA	45	2	12	14	49	12	0	4	4	12
1974–75	Kenosha Flyers	ContHL	21	18	27	45	—	—	—	—	—	—
1974–75	Saginaw Gears	IHL	9	1	6	7	14	17	8	13	21	45
1975–76	Milwaukee Admirals	USHL	1	0	0	0	0	—	—	—	—	—
1976–77	Milwaukee Admirals	USHL	23	5	21	26	81	—	—	—	—	—
WHA totals			119	25	57	82	144	12	0	4	4	12
NHL totals			749	108	132	240	1468	50	3	6	9	106
