= Butch Barber =

Canadian ice hockey player (1943–2019)

- Born: August 31, 1943 Fairview, Alberta, Canada
- Died: December 12, 2019 (aged 76) Kalispell, Montana, USA
- Height: 5 ft 10 in (178 cm)
- Weight: 172 lb (78 kg; 12 st 4 lb)
- Position: Defence
- Shot: Left
- Played for: WHA; Chicago Cougars; New York Golden Blades; AHL; Providence Reds; Cleveland Barons; Hershey Bears; Syracuse Eagles; CPHL; Houston Apollos; NAHL; Syracuse Blazers; SHL; Tidewater Sharks
- Playing career: 1964–1976

Robert Ian "Butch" Barber (August 31, 1943 - December 12, 2019) was a Canadian professional ice hockey player.

In World Hockey Association play, Barber played 75 games with Chicago Cougars during the 1972–73 season, and three games with the New York Golden Blades during the 1973–74 season.

== Career statistics ==
=== Regular season and playoffs ===
			Regular season					Playoffs
Season	Team	League	GP	G	A	Pts	PIM	GP	G	A	Pts	PIM
1962–63	Edmonton Oil Kings	CAHL	Statistics Unavailable
1963–64	Edmonton Oil Kings	SJHL	Statistics Unavailable
1964–65	Providence Reds	AHL	72	1	12	13	72	––	––	––	––	––
1965–66	Providence Reds	AHL	32	1	6	7	45	––	––	––	––	––
1965–66	Houston Apollos	CPHL	28	1	5	6	37	––	––	––	––	––
1966–67	Cleveland Barons	AHL	3	0	0	0	0	––	––	––	––	––
1966–67	Houston Apollos	CPHL	48	1	12	13	74	6	0	1	1	6
1967–68	Cleveland Barons	AHL	71	4	23	27	115	––	––	––	––	––
1968–69	Hershey Bears	AHL	74	2	29	31	143	11	0	2	2	20
1969–70	Hershey Bears	AHL	66	2	26	28	107	7	1	2	3	14
1970–71	Hershey Bears	AHL	72	5	19	24	76	4	0	0	0	6
1971–72	Hershey Bears	AHL	71	2	19	21	87	4	0	1	1	7
1972–73	Chicago Cougars	WHA	75	4	19	23	39	––	––	––	––	––
1973–74	Syracuse Blazers	NAHL	70	9	63	72	65	15	1	11	12	6
1973–74	New York Golden Blades/Jersey Knights	WHA	3	0	0	0	2	––	––	––	––	––
1974–75	Syracuse Eagles	AHL	38	2	9	11	36	1	0	0	0	0
1975–76	Tidewater Sharks	SHL	35	3	20	23	28	––	––	––	––	––
WHA totals			78	4	19	23	41	—	—	—	—	—
