= Frank Rochon =

Canadian ice hockey player

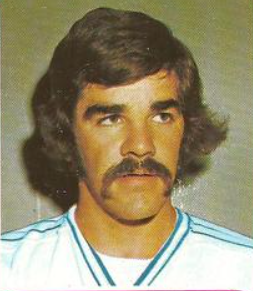
- Rochon in 1975 card
- Born: April 18, 1953 (age 73) Laval, Quebec, Canada
- Height: 5 ft 11 in (180 cm)
- Weight: 181 lb (82 kg; 12 st 13 lb)
- Position: Left wing
- Shot: Left
- Played for: Chicago Cougars; Denver Spurs/Ottawa Civics; Indianapolis Racers
- NHL draft: 52nd overall, 1973; Toronto Maple Leafs
- WHA draft: 27th overall, 1973; Chicago Cougars
- Playing career: 1973–1978

François "Frank" Rochon (born April 18, 1953, in Laval, Quebec) is a retired professional ice hockey player who played 255 games in the World Hockey Association. He played for the Chicago Cougars, Denver Spurs, Ottawa Civics and the Indianapolis Racers.

== Career statistics ==
			Regular season					Playoffs
Season	Team	League	GP	G	A	Pts	PIM	GP	G	A	Pts	PIM
1969–70	Laval Saints	QMJHL	55	17	19	36	48	—	—	—	—	—
1970–71	Rosemont National	QMJHL	62	13	24	37	71	—	—	—	—	—
1971–72	Sherbrooke Castors	QMJHL	60	20	25	45	79	4	0	0	0	7
1972–73	Sherbrooke Castors	QMJHL	63	52	57	109	52	8	4	4	8	24
1973–74	Chicago Cougars	WHA	69	12	11	23	27	9	2	1	3	0
1974–75	Chicago Cougars	WHA	69	27	29	56	19	—	—	—	—	—
1975–76	Denver Spurs/Ottawa Civics	WHA	41	11	10	21	10	—	—	—	—	—
1975–76	Indianapolis Racers	WHA	19	6	2	8	31	—	—	—	—	—
1976–77	Indianapolis Racers	WHA	57	15	8	23	8	5	0	1	1	0
1976–77	Mohawk Valley Comets	NAHL-Sr.	8	4	1	5	0	—	—	—	—	—
1977–78	Binghamton Dusters	AHL	75	23	21	44	18	—	—	—	—	—
WHA totals			255	71	60	131	95	14	2	2	4	0
