= Dick Proceviat =

Canadian ice hockey player

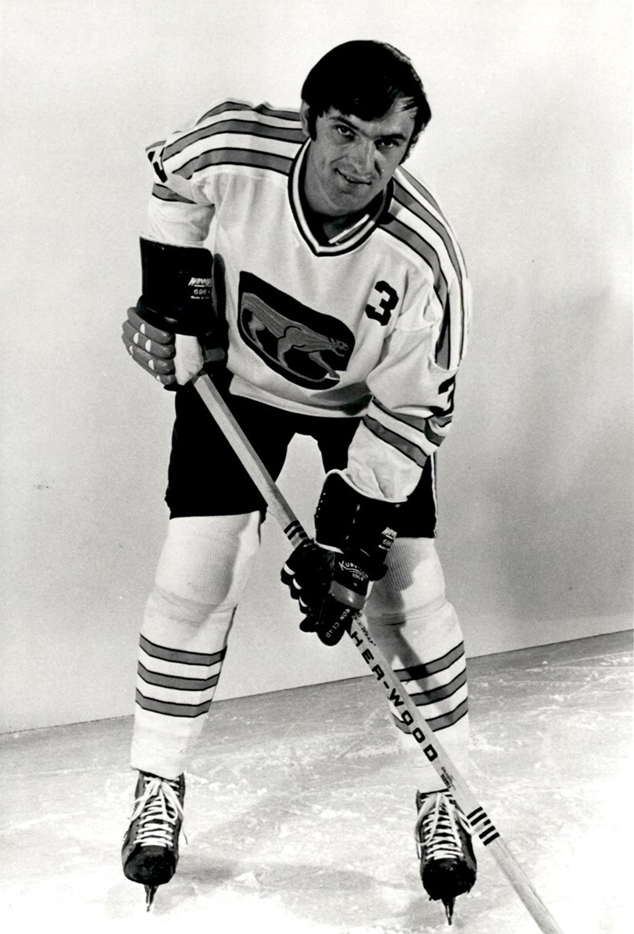
- Born: June 25, 1946 (age 80) Whitemouth, Manitoba, Canada
- Height: 6 ft 0 in (183 cm)
- Weight: 175 lb (79 kg; 12 st 7 lb)
- Position: Defence
- Shot: Left
- Played for: Columbus Checkers; Kansas City Blues; San Diego Gulls; Denver Spurs; Chicago Cougars; Long Island Cougars; Indianapolis Racers
- Playing career: 1967–1977

Dick Proceviat (born June 25, 1946) is a retired professional ice hockey player who played 321 games in the World Hockey Association. He played for the Chicago Cougars and Indianapolis Racers.

Proceviat was born in Whitemouth, Manitoba. He studied at Laurentian University, receiving a degree in history. During his playing days, he spent his summers working underground as a miner. He later became a police constable.

== Career statistics ==
=== Regular season and playoffs ===
			Regular season					Playoffs
Season	Team	League	GP	G	A	Pts	PIM	GP	G	A	Pts	PIM
1967-68	Columbus Checkers	IHL	72	5	43	48	63	4	0	1	1	8
1968–69	Kansas City Blues	CHL	70	2	16	18	75	4	0	0	0	2
1969–70	Kansas City Blues	CHL	60	3	28	31	127	—	—	—	—	—
1970–71	San Diego Gulls	WHL	8	0	2	2	0	—	—	—	—	—
1970–71	Kansas City Blues	CHL	58	18	14	32	40	—	—	—	—	—
1971–72	Kansas City Blues	CHL	67	7	47	54	137	—	—	—	—	—
1971–72	Denver Spurs	WHL	1	0	0	0	0	—	—	—	—	—
1972–73	Chicago Cougars	WHA	53	4	14	18	33	—	—	—	—	—
1973–74	Chicago Cougars	WHA	77	2	20	22	55	13	0	4	4	10
1974–75	Indianapolis Racers	WHA	52	1	28	29	51	—	—	—	—	—
1974–75	Long Island Cougars	NAHL	6	1	4	5	0	—	—	—	—	—
1974–75	Chicago Cougars	WHA	11	0	3	3	11	—	—	—	—	—
1975–76	Indianapolis Racers	WHA	73	7	13	20	31	7	0	0	0	2
1976–77	Indianapolis Racers	WHA	55	2	12	14	33	—	—	—	—	—
WHA totals			321	16	90	106	214	20	0	4	4	12
