= Brian Coates =

Canadian ice hockey player

- Born: September 22, 1952 (age 73) Carman, Manitoba, Canada
- Height: 6 ft 0 in (183 cm)
- Weight: 195 lb (88 kg; 13 st 13 lb)
- Position: Left wing
- Shot: Left
- Played for: Chicago Cougars; Indianapolis Racers; Cincinnati Stingers
- NHL draft: 80th overall, 1972; Boston Bruins
- Playing career: 1972–1980

Brian Coates (Born - September 22, 1952 in Carman, Manitoba) is a Canadian retired professional ice hockey forward who played 202 games in the World Hockey Association for the Chicago Cougars, Indianapolis Racers, and Cincinnati Stingers.

== Career statistics ==
=== Regular season and playoffs ===
			Regular season					Playoffs
Season	Team	League	GP	G	A	Pts	PIM	GP	G	A	Pts	PIM
1970–71	Winnipeg Monarchs	MJHL	48	28	25	53	40	—	—	—	—	—
1971–72	Brandon Wheat Kings	WCHL	67	22	44	66	65	—	—	—	—	—
1972–73	Boston Braves	AHL	3	0	0	0	0	4	0	0	0	0
1972–73	Cape Cod Cubs	EHL	75	36	46	82	96	—	—	—	—	—
1973–74	Long Island Cougars	NAHL	14	10	15	25	39	—	—	—	—	—
1973–74	Chicago Cougars	WHA	50	10	3	13	14	17	0	3	3	35
1974–75	Long Island Cougars	NAHL	42	21	37	58	33	9	4	3	7	13
1974–75	Chicago Cougars	WHA	35	12	9	21	26	—	—	—	—	—
1975–76	Indianapolis Racers	WHA	59	11	16	27	24	4	0	0	0	0
1975–76	Mohawk Valley Comets	NAHL	18	17	15	32	35	—	—	—	—	—
1976–77	Indianapolis Racers	WHA	16	1	5	6	4	—	—	—	—	—
1976–77	Mohawk Valley Comets	NAHL	43	34	35	69	48	—	—	—	—	—
1977–78	Hampton Gulls	AHL	29	13	14	27	27	—	—	—	—	—
1977–78	Cincinnati Stingers	WHA	42	8	10	18	18	—	—	—	—	—
1978–79	Philadelphia Firebirds	AHL	15	0	0	0	26	—	—	—	—	—
1978–79	Jersey/Hampton Aces	NEHL	57	50	54	104	102	—	—	—	—	—
1979–80	Muskegon Mohawks	IHL	13	5	11	16	4	5	0	4	4	14
1979–80	Saginaw Gears	IHL	58	26	34	60	47	—	—	—	—	—
WHA totals			202	42	43	85	86	21	0	3	3	35
