= Curt Brackenbury =

Canadian ice hockey player (born 1952)

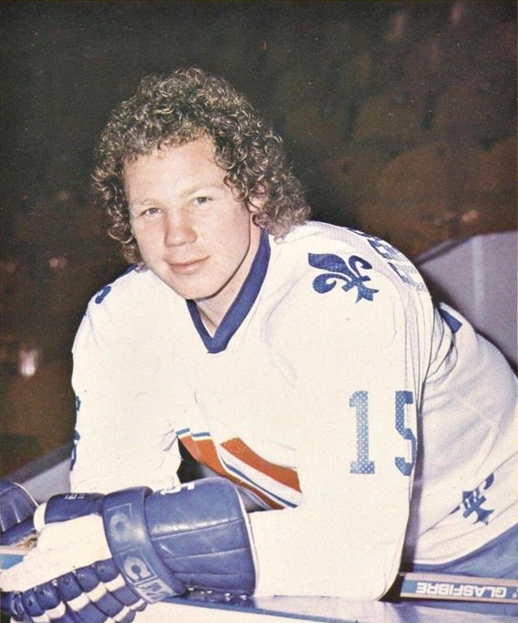
- Born: January 31, 1952 (age 74) Kapuskasing, Ontario, Canada
- Height: 5 ft 10 in (178 cm)
- Weight: 190 lb (86 kg; 13 st 8 lb)
- Position: Left wing
- Shot: Left
- Played for: Chicago Cougars; Minnesota Fighting Saints; Quebec Nordiques; Edmonton Oilers; St. Louis Blues
- NHL draft: Undrafted
- WHA draft: Undrafted
- Playing career: 1972–1983

John Curtis Brackenbury (born January 31, 1952) is a Canadian former professional ice hockey forward who played 141 games in the National Hockey League and 257 games in the World Hockey Association. Prior to the merger of the upstart WHA and the NHL, the WHA played European teams and Brackenbury was an MVP in at least one game. He played for the Chicago Cougars, Minnesota Fighting Saints, Quebec Nordiques, Edmonton Oilers, and St. Louis Blues.

On March 6, 1976, the Los Angeles Kings acquired Bert Wilson and the rights to Curt Brackenbury from the St. Louis Blues for cash.

In 1986 Brackenbury was recruited to Canada's America's Cup Challenge, the Canada II campaign. He trained with the team in Victoria, BC, San Francisco and Santa Cruz, California, and was chosen as part of the final crew to go to Australia to race for the cup.

He was inducted into the St. John's Ravenscourt Hall of Fame in 2011.

== Career statistics ==
=== Regular season and playoffs ===
			Regular season					Playoffs
Season	Team	League	GP	G	A	Pts	PIM	GP	G	A	Pts	PIM
1971–72	Sudbury Cub Wolves	NOJHL	25	7	7	14	15	—	—	—	—	—
1972–73	Jersey Devils	EHL-Sr.	68	17	27	44	66	—	—	—	—	—
1973–74	Chicago Cougars	WHA	4	0	1	1	11	—	—	—	—	—
1973–74	Des Moines Capitols	IHL	13	1	5	6	4	—	—	—	—	—
1973–74	Long Island Cougars	NAHL	45	8	20	28	194	17	5	1	6	51
1974–75	Hampton Gulls	SHL	46	19	24	43	212	13	5	5	10	48
1974–75	Minnesota Fighting Saints	WHA	7	0	0	0	22	12	0	2	2	59
1975–76	Minnesota Fighting Saints	WHA	59	4	9	13	255	—	—	—	—	—
1975–76	Quebec Nordiques	WHA	15	4	5	9	110	5	0	0	0	18
1976–77	Quebec Nordiques	WHA	77	16	13	29	146	17	3	5	8	51
1977–78	Quebec Nordiques	WHA	33	4	9	13	54	10	1	1	2	31
1978–79	Quebec Nordiques	WHA	70	13	13	26	155	4	1	1	2	2
1979–80	Quebec Nordiques	NHL	63	6	8	14	55	—	—	—	—	—
1980–81	Edmonton Oilers	NHL	58	2	7	9	153	2	0	0	0	0
1981–82	Edmonton Oilers	NHL	14	0	2	2	12	—	—	—	—	—
1981–82	Wichita Wind	CHL	47	11	27	38	99	7	0	7	7	13
1982–83	St. Louis Blues	NHL	6	1	0	1	6	—	—	—	—	—
1982–83	Salt Lake Golden Eagles	CHL	44	4	19	23	137	5	0	1	1	2
NHL totals			141	9	17	26	226	2	0	0	0	0
WHA totals			265	41	50	91	753	48	5	9	14	161
